= 2024–25 Nyíregyháza Spartacus FC season =

Nyíregyháza
2024–25 season
- Manager: Krisztián Tímár (until 7 April 2025); István Szabó (from 8 April 2025)
- Stadium: Városi Stadion (Mezőkövesd) (Note: Nyíregyháza played the first home game at the Városi Stadion in Mezőkövesd, due to the team's inability to occupy the newly built stadium in Nyíregyháza.) (Temporary stadium); Városi Stadion (Nyíregyháza) (New stadium)
- Nemzeti Bajnokság I: 8th
- Magyar Kupa: Quarter-finals
- Top goalscorer: League: Péter Beke; Márk Kovácsréti (6 each); All: Péter Beke; Márk Kovácsréti (6 each)
- Highest home attendance: 8,246 v Debrecen (25 April 2025, Nemzeti Bajnokság I)
- Lowest home attendance: 1,600 v Győr (26 July 2024, Nemzeti Bajnokság I)
- Average home league attendance: 5,778
- Biggest win: 2–0 v Kecskemét (Away, 28 September 2024, Nemzeti Bajnokság I); 2–0 v MTK (Home, 8 November 2024, Nemzeti Bajnokság I); 4–2 v Paks (Home, 29 November 2024, Nemzeti Bajnokság I)
- Biggest defeat: 0–7 v Ferencváros (Away, 20 April 2025, Nemzeti Bajnokság I)
Home colours	Away colours	Third colours

The 2024–25 season was Nyíregyháza Spartacus Football Club's 13th competitive season, 98th season in existence as a football club and first season in the Nemzeti Bajnokság I after winning the second division in the previous season. In addition to the domestic league, Nyíregyháza participated in that season's editions of the Magyar Kupa.

== Squad ==
Squad at end of season

Note: Flags indicate national team as defined under FIFA eligibility rules; some limited exceptions apply. Players may hold more than one non-FIFA nationality.

No.	Pos.	Nation	Player
1	GK	HUN	Mátyás Molnár
3	DF	SRB	Ranko Jokić
4	DF	HUN	Áron Alaxai
6	MF	UKR	Yuriy Toma
7	FW	CZE	Jaroslav Navrátil
8	MF	CIV	Aboubakar Keita
9	FW	HUN	Péter Beke
10	MF	ROU	Ronaldo Deaconu
12	MF	HUN	Milán Kovács
14	FW	HUN	Dominik Nagy
15	DF	HUN	Attila Temesvári
16	MF	GEO	Nika Kvekveskiri
21	DF	MKD	Darko Velkovski
23	FW	HUN	Márk Kovácsréti
24	DF	HUN	Krisztián Keresztes

No.	Pos.	Nation	Player
27	FW	HUN	Márton Eppel
28	MF	SRB	Ognjen Radošević
29	MF	HUN	Zoltán Daróczi
30	FW	GAM	Modou Lamin Marong
32	GK	HUN	Balázs Tóth
33	DF	HUN	Olivér Tamás
44	DF	CYP	Pavlos Korrea
45	FW	SRB	Slobodan Babić
49	FW	HUN	Krisztián Géresi
55	FW	SVN	Žan Medved
66	DF	HUN	Barna Benczenleitner
77	DF	HUN	Barnabás Nagy
90	DF	HUN	Krisztián Kovács
88	DF	HUN	Bendegúz Farkas
95	GK	ROU	Béla Fejér

== Transfers ==
=== Transfers in ===
Transfer window	Pos.	No.	Player	From
Summer	DF	3	(Serbia) Ranko Jokić	(Bosnia and Herzegovina) Borac Banja Luka
Summer	FW	7	(Czech Republic) Jaroslav Navrátil	(Hungary) Kisvárda
Summer	MF	8	(Ivory Coast) Aboubakar Keita	Free agent (Note: Previous club Újpest.)
Summer	DF	11	(Hungary) Kevin Horváth	(Hungary) Mosonmagyaróvár
Summer	MF	12	(Hungary) Milán Kovács	(Hungary) Gyirmót
Summer	MF	16	(Georgia (country)) Nika Kvekveskiri	Free agent (Note: Previous club Lech Poznań.)
Summer	DF	24	(Hungary) Krisztián Keresztes	(Slovakia) DAC Dunajská Streda
Summer	DF	25	(Brazil) Matheus Leoni	(Hungary) Kecskemét
Summer	FW	27	(Hungary) Márton Eppel	(Poland) Warta Poznań
Summer	GK	32	(Hungary) Balázs Tóth	(Hungary) Diósgyőr
Summer	FW	45	(Serbia) Slobodan Babić	(Montenegro) Petrovac
Summer	FW	74	(Slovakia) Patrik Pinte	(Hungary) Kazincbarcika
Winter	MF	10	(Romania) Ronaldo Deaconu	Free agent (Note: Previous club Hermannstadt.)
Winter	DF	21	(North Macedonia) Darko Velkovski	Free agent
Winter	DF	44	(Cyprus) Pavlos Korrea	Free agent (Note: Previous club Volos.)
Winter	FW	55	(Slovenia) Žan Medved	(Slovakia) Košice
Winter	DF	66	(Hungary) Barna Benczenleitner	(Hungary) Honvéd

=== Transfers out ===
Transfer window	Pos.	No.	Player	To
Summer	MF	8	(Hungary) Ákos Sigér	Released (Note: Joined Honvéd.)
Summer	FW	9	(Hungary) Csanád Novák	Released (Note: Joined Szeged.)
Summer	MF	11	(Hungary) Kristóf Herjeczki	(Hungary) Kazincbarcika
Summer	MF	17	(Hungary) Patrik Vass	Released (Note: Joined Tatabánya.)
Summer	DF	21	(Ukraine) Mykhaylo Ryashko	Released (Note: Joined Kecskemét.)
Summer	MF	93	(Hungary) Barna Kesztyűs	(Hungary) Honvéd
Winter	FW	10	(Brazil) Myke Ramos	(Hungary) Kazincbarcika
Winter	DF	13	(Hungary) Gergő Gengeliczki	(Hungary) Sényő
Winter	MF	19	(Hungary) Mátyás Gresó	(Hungary) Mezőkövesd
Winter	MF	22	(Hungary) Bence Pataki	(Hungary) Tiszakécske
Winter	DF	44	(Hungary) Ákos Baki	(Hungary) Honvéd

=== Loans in ===
Transfer window	Pos.	No.	Player	From	End date
Summer	MF	28	(Serbia) Ognjen Radošević	(Hungary) Újpest	End of season
Summer	DF	88	(Hungary) Bendegúz Farkas	(Hungary) Puskás Akadémia	End of season
Winter	DF	90	(Hungary) Krisztián Kovács	(Hungary) Paks	End of season

=== Loans out ===
Transfer window	Pos.	No.	Player	To	End date
Summer	DF	11	(Hungary) Kevin Horváth	(Hungary) Mezőkövesd	End of season
Summer	FW	92	(Hungary) Barnabás Németh	(Hungary) Vasas	End of season
Winter	GK	1	(Hungary) Balázs Bese	(Hungary) Tatabánya	End of season
Winter	FW	18	(Hungary) Benjámin Oláh	(Hungary) Mezőkövesd	End of season
Winter	FW	74	(Slovakia) Patrik Pinte	(Hungary) Honvéd	End of season

== Competitions ==
=== Overview ===
Competition	First match	Last match	Starting round	Final position	Record							
Competition	First match	Last match	Starting round	Final position	Pld	W	D	L	GF	GA	GD	Win %
Nemzeti Bajnokság I	26 July 2024	25 May 2025	Matchday 1	8th	33	9	9	15	31	52	−21	27.27
Magyar Kupa	14 September 2024	1 April 2025	Round of 64	Quarter-finals	4	1	2	1	5	6	−1	25.00
Total					37	10	11	16	36	58	−22	27.03

Source: Competitions

=== Nemzeti Bajnokság I ===
==== League table ====
Pos	Team	Pld	W	D	L	GF	GA	GD	Pts
6	Diósgyőr	33	11	11	11	43	51	−8	44
7	Újpest	33	9	14	10	38	44	−6	41
8	Nyíregyháza	33	9	9	15	31	52	−21	36
9	Debrecen	33	9	7	17	52	59	−7	34
10	Zalaegerszeg	33	7	13	13	35	42	−7	34

Source: Hungarian Football Federation (in Hungarian)
Rules for classification: 1) Points; 2) Matches won; 3) Goal difference; 4) Goals scored; 5) Head-to-head points; 6) Head-to-head goal difference; 7) Fair play ranking; 8) Drawing of lots.

==== Results summary ====
Overall								Home						Away					
Pld	W	D	L	GF	GA	GD	Pts	W	D	L	GF	GA	GD	W	D	L	GF	GA	GD
33	9	9	15	31	52	−21	36	7	5	5	18	18	0	2	4	10	13	34	−21

Source: Hungarian Football Federation

==== Results by round ====
Round	1	2	3	4	5	6	7	8	9	10	11	12	13	14	15	16	17	18	19	20	21	22	23	24	25	26	27	28	29	30	31	32	33
Ground	H	A	A	A	H	A	H	A	H	A	H	A	H	H	H	A	H	A	H	A	H	A	H	A	H	A	H	A	H	A	H	A	H
Result	W	L	L	L	D	L	W	W	L	L	D	D	W	L	W	L	L	L	D	W	D	D	L	L	L	L	W	L	W	D	W	D	D
Position	2	7	9	11	11	11	10	8	8	9	9	9	8	8	8	8	8	9	11	10	10	10	10	10	10	11	10	11	9	9	8	8	8
Points	3	3	3	3	4	4	7	10	10	10	11	12	15	15	18	18	18	18	19	22	23	24	24	24	24	24	27	27	30	31	34	35	36

Source: Matches
A = Away; H = Home; W = Win; D = Draw; L = Loss

==== Matches ====
26 July 2024 1	Nyíregyháza	2–1	Győr	Mezőkövesd
20:15 CEST (UTC+2)	Kovácsréti 29', (yellow card) 90+5'; Beke 55'; Jokić (yellow card) 85'	Report	Gavrić (yellow card) 58'; Bitri (yellow card) 70'; Borbély (manager) (yellow card) 75'; Krivokapić 78', (yellow card) 90+5'; Csontos (yellow card) 83'	Stadium: Városi Stadion; Attendance: 1,600; Referee: József Erdős; Assistant referees: Balázs Szalai, Dávid Rózsa; Fourth official: Dr. Bence Csonka

3 August 2024 2	MTK	3–0	Nyíregyháza	Budapest
19:45 CEST (UTC+2)	Beriashvili 24'; Stieber 77', 90+5' (pen.)	Report	Gengeliczki (yellow card) 57'; Fejér (yellow card) 90+4'	Stadium: Hidegkuti Nándor Stadion; Attendance: 2,729; Referee: Marcell Derdák; Assistant referees: Péter Garai, Péter Ország; Fourth official: Tamás Bognár

11 August 2024 3	Puskás Akadémia	3–1	Nyíregyháza	Felcsút
20:15 CEST (UTC+2)	Komáromi 3'; Levi 35'; Favorov (yellow card) 45'; Plšek 90+2' (pen.)	Report	Farkas (yellow card) 28'; Beke 65'	Stadium: Pancho Aréna; Attendance: 921; Referee: Tamás Bognár; Assistant referees: Balázs Buzás, Péter Kóbor; Fourth official: Mihály Káprály

18 August 2024 4	Paks	2–1	Nyíregyháza	Paks
17:45 CEST (UTC+2)	Kinyik 5'; Silye 44'	Report	Kesztyűs (yellow card) 2'; Tamás 16'; Navrátil (yellow card) 63'; Eppel (yellow card) 90+5'	Stadium: Fehérvári úti Stadion; Attendance: 2,219; Referee: Péter Zierkelbach; Assistant referees: Gergely Becséri, Dávid Rózsa; Fourth official: Péter Antal

25 August 2024 5	Nyíregyháza	3–3	Fehérvár	Nyíregyháza
17:45 CEST (UTC+2)	Eppel 6'; Kovácsréti 40', (yellow card) 90+6'; Baki (yellow card) 65'; Babić 88'	Report	Katona (yellow card) 8'; Serafimov (yellow card) 22'; Spandler (yellow card) 34'; Gradišar 45'; Christensen (yellow card) 58'; Mi. Kovács 61' (o.g.); Alaxai 85' (o.g.); M. Pető (yellow card) 90+6'	Stadium: Városi Stadion; Attendance: 7,800; Referee: Tamás Bognár; Assistant referees: István Albert, Balázs Buzás; Fourth official: Gergő Bogár

1 September 2024 6	Ferencváros	2–1	Nyíregyháza	Budapest
19:45 CEST (UTC+2)	Gartenmann 19'; Botka (yellow card) 37'; B. Varga 59' (pen.); Dibusz (yellow card) 79'; Zachariassen (yellow card) 81'	Report	Keita (yellow card) 28'; Alaxai (yellow card) 32'; Kovácsréti (yellow card) 34', (goal) 65'; Baki (yellow card) 85'; Jokić (yellow card) 85'	Stadium: Groupama Arena; Attendance: 8,175; Referee: Dr. Bence Csonka; Assistant referees: Vencel Tóth II, Balázs Szert; Fourth official: Mihály Káprály

21 September 2024 7	Nyíregyháza	3–2	Debrecen	Nyíregyháza
19:30 CEST (UTC+2)	B. Nagy 23'; Toma (yellow card) 33'; Navrátil 36', 65'; Kovácsréti (yellow card) 47'; Keita (yellow card) 77'; Gresó (yellow card) 84'; Baki (yellow card) 90+2'	Report	Pëllumbi 8'; Drešković (yellow card) 61'; Dzsudzsák 79' (pen.); Silue (yellow card) 88'	Stadium: Városi Stadion; Attendance: 8,000; Referee: Balázs Berke; Assistant referees: Norbert Bornemissza, Péter Garai; Fourth official: Ádám Pillók

28 September 2024 8	Kecskemét	0–2	Nyíregyháza	Kecskemét
17:00 CEST (UTC+2)	Belényesi (yellow card) 7'; Ryashko (yellow card) 33'; Bocskay (yellow card) 43'; K. Nagy (yellow card) 61'; Szabó (yellow card) 82'; Pálinkás (yellow card) 83'; Montiel (yellow card) 90+5'	Report	D. Nagy (yellow card) 12'; Kovácsréti 27'; Navrátil 42'; Toma (yellow card) 52'; Keita (yellow card) 83'	Stadium: Széktói Stadion; Attendance: 1,413; Referee: Marcell Derdák; Assistant referees: Balázs Huszár, Ákos Berényi; Fourth official: Imre Kovács

5 October 2024 9	Nyíregyháza	0–2	Diósgyőr	Nyíregyháza
19:30 CEST (UTC+2)	Navrátil (yellow card) 86'; D. Nagy (yellow card) 87'	Report	Gera (yellow card) 4', (goal) 46'; Edomwonyi 14'; Saničanin (yellow card) 45+4'; Klimovich (yellow card) 62'; Vallejo (yellow card) 82'; Rharsalla (yellow card) 90+1'; Bárdos (yellow card) 90+3'	Stadium: Városi Stadion; Attendance: 8,000; Referee: Gergő Bogár; Assistant referees: Gergely Becséri, Dávid Rózsa; Fourth official: Imre Kovács

19 October 2024 10	Újpest	1–0	Nyíregyháza	Budapest
19:30 CEST (UTC+2)	Duarte (yellow card) 9', (goal) 90'; Ljujić (yellow card) 90+3'	Report	Toma (yellow card) 45'; Keita (yellow card) 71'; Gengeliczki (yellow card) 83'; D. Nagy (yellow card) 86'	Stadium: Szusza Ferenc Stadion; Attendance: 6,039; Referee: Márton Rúsz; Assistant referees: István Albert, Ákos Berényi; Fourth official: Gergő Bogár

27 October 2024 11	Nyíregyháza	1–1	Zalaegerszeg	Nyíregyháza
13:00 CET (UTC+1)	Alaxai (yellow card) 65'; D. Nagy 90'; Keresztes (yellow card) 90+3'	Report	Evangelou (yellow card) 7'; Mim 15'; Safronov (yellow card) 37'	Stadium: Városi Stadion; Attendance: 5,822; Referee: Csaba Pintér; Assistant referees: Balázs Szalai, Dávid Rózsa; Fourth official: Márton Rúsz

2 November 2024 12	Győr	1–1	Nyíregyháza	Győr
19:00 CET (UTC+1)	Bitri (yellow card) 28', (goal) 38'; Benbouali (yellow card) 61'; Marku (yellow card) 86'	Report	Toma (yellow card) 18'; Kvekveskiri 64'	Stadium: ETO Park; Attendance: 3,347; Referee: Imre Kovács; Assistant referees: Balázs Szert, Dániel Szalai; Fourth official: Ádám Pillók

8 November 2024 13	Nyíregyháza	2–0	MTK	Nyíregyháza
20:00 CET (UTC+1)	Kvekveskiri (yellow card) 12'; D. Nagy 32', (yellow card) 88'; Kovácsréti 40' (pen.); Baki (yellow card) 90'	Report	Stieber (yellow card) 82'	Stadium: Városi Stadion; Attendance: 5,013; Referee: Ádám Pillók; Assistant referees: Gergely Becséri, Dávid Rózsa; Fourth official: Imre Kovács

23 November 2024 14	Nyíregyháza	0–3	Puskás Akadémia	Nyíregyháza
13:30 CET (UTC+1)	Alaxai (yellow card) 12'; D. Nagy (yellow card) 30'; B. Nagy (yellow card) 72'	Report	Levi 41'; Z. Nagy 58' (pen.); Golla (yellow card) 62'; Favorov (yellow card) 88'; Puljić 90+5'	Stadium: Városi Stadion; Attendance: 4,329; Referee: Dr. Bence Csonka; Assistant referees: Balázs Szalai, Róbert Horváth; Fourth official: Imre Kovács

29 November 2024 15	Nyíregyháza	4–2	Paks	Nyíregyháza
20:00 CET (UTC+1)	Beke 2', 20'; Kovácsréti 18'; Toma (yellow card) 27'; Gengeliczki (yellow card) 65'; Keita (yellow card) 66'; Babić (yellow card) 88', (goal) 90'; B. Nagy (yellow card) 90+2'	Report	Keresztes 39' (o.g.); Bar. Tóth (yellow card) 65'; Böde 84'; Ötvös (yellow card) 89'	Stadium: Városi Stadion; Attendance: 4,052; Referee: József Erdős; Assistant referees: Norbert Bornemissza, Dániel Szalai; Fourth official: Ádám Pillók

8 December 2024 16	Fehérvár	2–0	Nyíregyháza	Székesfehérvár
14:45 CET (UTC+1)	Gradišar 70'; M. Katona 81' (pen.)	Report	Baki (yellow card) 69'; D. Nagy (yellow card) 83'; Myke (yellow card) 85'	Stadium: Sóstói Stadion; Attendance: 2,175; Referee: Marcell Derdák; Assistant referees: Balázs Szalai, Péter Ország; Fourth official: Péter Antal

15 December 2024 17	Nyíregyháza	0–1	Ferencváros	Nyíregyháza
15:30 CET (UTC+1)	Keresztes (yellow card) 36'; D. Nagy (yellow card) 40'; Toma (yellow card) 76'; Alaxai (yellow card) 77'	Report	Maïga (yellow card) 53'; Traoré (yellow card) 77'; B. Varga 83', (yellow card) 87'; Dibusz (yellow card) 90+3'	Stadium: Városi Stadion; Attendance: 8,000; Referee: Mihály Káprály; Assistant referees: Gergő Vígh-Tarsonyi, Ákos Berényi; Fourth official: Imre Kovács

2 February 2025 18	Debrecen	3–1	Nyíregyháza	Debrecen
12:45 CET (UTC+1)	Bárány 8', (yellow card) 23'; Maurides 77', 90+1'; Hofmann (yellow card) 83'	Report	Maurides 12' (o.g.); A. Keita (yellow card) 76'; Jokić (yellow card) 80'; Temesvári (red card) 88'; Toma (yellow card) 90'	Stadium: Nagyerdei Stadion; Attendance: 8,011; Referee: Gergő Bogár; Assistant referees: Zoltán Horváth, Ákos Berényi; Fourth official: Péter Antal

8 February 2025 19	Nyíregyháza	0–0	Kecskemét	Nyíregyháza
14:30 CET (UTC+1)	Keita (red card) 25'; Kovácsréti (yellow card) 56'; Korrea (yellow card) 67'	Report	L. Katona (yellow card) 17'; Zeke (yellow card) 30'	Stadium: Városi Stadion; Attendance: 4,058; Referee: Péter Zierkelbach; Assistant referees: Balázs Szalai, Gergely Becséri; Fourth official: József Erdős

15 February 2025 20	Diósgyőr	1–2	Nyíregyháza	Miskolc
17:00 CET (UTC+1)	Komlósi (yellow card) 9'; Rakonjac 60' (pen.); Holdampf (yellow card) 76'	Report	B. Nagy (yellow card) 8'; M. Kovács (yellow card) 20'; Beke 39'; D. Nagy (yellow card) 43'; Keresztes (yellow card) 72'; Babić 90+1'	Stadium: Diósgyőri Stadion; Attendance: 7,552; Referee: Dr. Bence Csonka; Assistant referees: István Albert, Balázs Szert; Fourth official: Marcell Derdák

22 February 2025 21	Nyíregyháza	0–0	Újpest	Nyíregyháza
19:30 CET (UTC+1)	D. Nagy (red card) 24'; Korrea (yellow card) 47'	Report	Ljujić (yellow card) 27'; Rasak (yellow card) 74'; Duarte (yellow card) 90+2'	Stadium: Városi Stadion; Attendance: 4,892; Referee: Balázs Berke; Assistant referees: Zoltán Horváth, Dávid Rózsa; Fourth official: Marcell Derdák

1 March 2025 22	Zalaegerszeg	0–0	Nyíregyháza	Zalaegerszeg
14:30 CET (UTC+1)	Evangelou (yellow card) 46'; Csóka (yellow card) 49'; Szendrei (yellow card) 56'	Report	Keita (yellow card) 58'; Benczenleitner (yellow card) 75'; Kovácsréti (yellow card) 76'; Kvekveskiri (yellow card) 90+2'	Stadium: ZTE Arena; Attendance: 2,358; Referee: József Erdős; Assistant referees: Dániel Szalai, József Aradi; Fourth official: Imre Kovács

8 March 2025 23	Nyíregyháza	0–1	Győr	Nyíregyháza
14:30 CET (UTC+1)		Report	Szépe 64'	Stadium: Városi Stadion; Attendance: 4,539; Referee: Marcell Derdák; Assistant referees: Balázs Buzás, Péter Ország; Fourth official: Márton Rúsz

16 March 2025 24	MTK	3–0	Nyíregyháza	Budapest
17:15 CET (UTC+1)	A. Horváth 48'; Végh (yellow card) 59'; K. Németh 75'; Varju (yellow card) 89'; Polievka 90+3'	Report	Korrea (yellow card) 26'; Beke (yellow card) 27'; D. Nagy (yellow card) 45'	Stadium: Hidegkuti Nándor Stadion; Attendance: 2,762; Referee: Tamás Bognár; Assistant referees: Gergely Becséri, Dávid Rózsa; Fourth official: Eszter Urbán

29 March 2025 25	Nyíregyháza	0–2	Puskás Akadémia	Nyíregyháza
19:30 CET (UTC+1)	Alaxai (yellow card) 55'; Navrátil (yellow card) 87'	Report	Nissilä 5', 30'; Levi (yellow card) 54'	Stadium: Városi Stadion; Attendance: 4,034; Referee: Márton Rúsz; Assistant referees: István Szécsényi, Dániel Szalai; Fourth official: Eszter Urbán

5 April 2025 26	Paks	2–0	Nyíregyháza	Paks
17:00 CEST (UTC+2)	Papp 21'; Osváth (yellow card) 27', (goal) 66'	Report	Kvekveskiri (yellow card) 40'; Toma (yellow card) 61'	Stadium: Fehérvári úti Stadion; Attendance: 3,002; Referee: István Vad; Assistant referees: Vencel Tóth II, Gergő Vígh-Tarsonyi; Fourth official: Imre Kovács

13 April 2025 27	Nyíregyháza	1–0	Fehérvár	Nyíregyháza
19:00 CEST (UTC+2)	Medved (yellow card) 16'; Keresztes 73'; Toma (yellow card) 90+2'	Report	Huszti (yellow card) 13'; Melnyk (red card) 76'; Petrov (yellow card) 88'; Spandler (yellow card) 90+3'	Stadium: Városi Stadion; Attendance: 4,255; Referee: Balázs Berke; Assistant referees: Balázs Szalai, Bence Péter Belicza; Fourth official: Ádám Pillók

20 April 2025 28	Ferencváros	7–0	Nyíregyháza	Budapest
15:45 CEST (UTC+2)	Pešić 2', 35'; Saldanha 21', 53'; A. Tóth 59'; Joseph 81'; B. Varga 85'; Makreckis (yellow card) 89'	Report	Jokić (yellow card) 22'; M. Kovács (yellow card) 24'; Eppel (yellow card) 71'	Stadium: Groupama Arena; Attendance: 10,765; Referee: Gergő Bogár; Assistant referees: Balázs Szert, Bence Péter Belicza; Fourth official: Ádám Pillók

25 April 2025 29	Nyíregyháza	1–0	Debrecen	Nyíregyháza
20:00 CEST (UTC+2)	Eppel 55' (pen.); Alaxai (yellow card) 80'; B. Tóth (yellow card) 88'; Keita (yellow card) 90+7'	Report	Szécsi (yellow card) 34'; Szuhodovszki (yellow card) 43'; Gonda (yellow card) 54'; Hofmann (red card) 88'; Malinov (yellow card) 90+3'; Maurides (yellow card) 90+7'; Youga (yellow card) 90+10'	Stadium: Városi Stadion; Attendance: 8,246; Referee: Tamás Bognár; Assistant referees: Péter Kóbor, Gergely Becséri; Fourth official: Imre Kovács

4 May 2025 30	Kecskemét	2–2	Nyíregyháza	Kecskemét
16:00 CEST (UTC+2)	Ryashko (yellow card) 25'; Zsótér (yellow card) 27'; L. Katona (yellow card) 58', (goal) 90+4'; Montiel 75'; Belényesi (yellow card) 90+5'	Report	Beke 1'; Toma (yellow card) 36'; B. Nagy (yellow card) 71'; D. Nagy 74'	Stadium: Széktói Stadion; Attendance: 2,079; Referee: Imre Kovács; Assistant referees: Georgiou Theodoros, Péter Ország; Fourth official: Gergő Bogár

11 May 2025 31	Nyíregyháza	1–0	Diósgyőr	Nyíregyháza
15:30 CEST (UTC+2)	Beke (yellow card) 52'; M. Kovács (yellow card) 69'; Eppel 70'; D. Nagy (yellow card) 76'	Report	Gera (yellow card) 29'; Holdampf (yellow card) 69'; Acolatse (yellow card) 72'; Chorbadzhiyski (yellow card) 76'; Edomwonyi (yellow card) 90+2'	Stadium: Városi Stadion; Attendance: 8,053; Referee: Balázs Berke; Assistant referees: Gergely Becséri, Dávid Rózsa; Fourth official: Imre Kovács

16 May 2025 32	Újpest	2–2	Nyíregyháza	Budapest
20:30 CEST (UTC+2)	Kr. Horváth 25'; Brodić 68'; Fiola (yellow card) 90+2'	Report	Eppel 29', (yellow card) 43'; M. Kovács 60', (yellow card) 64'; Jokić (yellow card) 72'	Stadium: Szusza Ferenc Stadion; Attendance: 5,196; Referee: József Erdős; Assistant referees: István Szécsényi, Dávid Rózsa; Fourth official: Attila Molnár

25 May 2025 33	Nyíregyháza	0–0	Zalaegerszeg	Nyíregyháza
14:15 CEST (UTC+2)	D. Nagy (yellow card) 32'; Korrea (yellow card) 36'; K. Kovács (yellow card) 70'; Eppel (yellow card) 73'; Alaxai (yellow card) 82'; Tamás (red card) 90'	Report	Sanković (yellow card) 58'; Csóka (yellow card) 73'; Esiti (yellow card) 80'; Szendrei (yellow card) 83'	Stadium: Városi Stadion; Attendance: 7,531; Referee: Márton Rúsz; Assistant referees: Péter Garai, Norbert Bornemissza; Fourth official: Ádám Pillók

=== Magyar Kupa ===
14 September 2024 Round of 64	Vasas	1–1 (a.e.t.) (6–7 p)	Nyíregyháza	Budapest
16:00 CEST (UTC+2)	Urblík 8' (yellow card) 28'; Rácz (yellow card) 96'; M. Tóth (yellow card) 96'	Report	B. Tóth (yellow card) 44'; Keita (yellow card) 47'; Eppel 58'; Jokić (yellow card) 96'; Bouard (yellow card) 105'; Navrátil (yellow card) 120'	Stadium: Illovszky Rudolf Stadion; Attendance: 1,519; Referee: József Erdős; Assistant referees: Vencel Tóth II, Gergő Vígh-Tarsonyi; Fourth official: Dr. Bence Csonka
	Penalties
	Urblík (penalty scored); Könyves (penalty scored); Vida (penalty scored); Lehoczky (penalty scored); M. Tóth (penalty scored); Otigba (penalty scored); Rácz (penalty missed)		(penalty scored) Bouard; (penalty scored) Kovácsréti; (penalty scored) Keresztes; (penalty scored) Baki; (penalty scored) Kvekveskiri; (penalty scored) Navrátil; (penalty scored) B. Nagy

30 October 2024 Round of 32	Ajka	3–3 (a.e.t.) (2–4 p)	Nyíregyháza	Ajka
17:00 CET (UTC+1)	G. Tóth 30'; Csizmadia 47'; Jagodics (yellow card) 61'; Bobál 81' (yellow card) 82'; Garai (yellow card) 84'; Zsolnai (yellow card) 95'	Report	Leoni (yellow card) 14'; Jokić 36'; D. Nagy 62'; Leoni 67'; Radošević (yellow card) 92'; Eppel (yellow card) 99'	Stadium: Városi Sportcentrum; Attendance: 1,000; Referee: Gergely Bana; Assistant referees: Balázs Kiss, Zsolt Király; Fourth official: Gábor Iványi
	Penalties
	P. Horváth (penalty missed); Zsolnai (penalty missed); Bobál (penalty scored); Borsos (penalty scored)		(penalty missed) M. Kovács; (penalty scored) Kovácsréti; (penalty scored) Eppel; (penalty scored) Keresztes; (penalty scored) B. Nagy

25 February 2025 Round of 16	Nyíregyháza	1–0	Puskás Akadémia	Nyíregyháza
20:00 CET (UTC+1)	Jokić 13', (yellow card) 81'; Babić (yellow card) 58'; Radošević (yellow card) 65'; Benczenleitner (yellow card) 90+2'	Report	Vékony (yellow card) 27'	Stadium: Városi Stadion; Attendance: 2,852; Referee: Gergő Bogár; Assistant referees: Balázs Szalai, Bence Péter Belicza; Fourth official: Balázs Berke

1 April 2025 Quarter-finals	Zalaegerszeg	2–0	Nyíregyháza	Zalaegerszeg
19:30 CEST (UTC+2)	Ipalibo 33', (yellow card) 52'; Várkonyi 67'	Report	Alaxai (yellow card) 13'; Keresztes (yellow card) 38'; Korrea (yellow card) 51'; Toma (yellow card) 87'	Stadium: ZTE Arena; Attendance: 1,560; Referee: József Erdős; Assistant referees: Georgiou Theodoros, Péter Ország; Fourth official: Dr. Bence Csonka

== Statistics ==
=== Overall ===
Appearances (Apps) numbers are for appearances in competitive games only, including sub appearances.
Source: Competitions

No.	Player	Pos.	Nemzeti Bajnokság I				Magyar Kupa				Total			
No.	Player	Pos.	Apps	Goal	Booked	Sent off (straight red)	Apps	Goal	Booked	Sent off (straight red)	Apps	Goal	Booked	Sent off (straight red)
1	(Hungary) Balázs Bese	GK	3								3			
1	(Hungary) Mátyás Molnár	GK												
3	(Serbia) Ranko Jokić	DF	14		5		3	2	2		17	2	7	
4	(Hungary) Áron Alaxai	DF	30		7		4		1		34		8	
6	(Ukraine) Yuriy Toma	MF	22		10		2		1		24		11	
7	(Czech Republic) Jaroslav Navrátil	FW	21	3	3		3		1		24	3	4	
8	(Ivory Coast) Aboubakar Keita	MF	25		8	1	2		1		27		9	1
9	(Hungary) Péter Beke	FW	25	6	2		2				27	6	2	
10	(Romania) Ronaldo Deaconu	MF	5				1				6			
10	(Brazil) Myke Ramos	FW	10		1		1		1		11		2	
11	(Hungary) Kevin Horváth	DF												
12	(Hungary) Milán Kovács	MF	17	1	4		3				20	1	4	
13	(Hungary) Gergő Gengeliczki	DF	11		3		1				12		3	
14	(Hungary) Dominik Nagy	FW	25	3	11	1	3	1			28	4	11	1
15	(Hungary) Attila Temesvári	DF	12			1	3				15			1
16	(Georgia (country)) Nika Kvekveskiri	MF	17	1	3		2				19	1	3	
18	(Hungary) Benjámin Oláh	FW	2								2			
19	(Hungary) Mátyás Gresó	MF	9		1		2				11		1	
21	(Ukraine) Mykhaylo Ryashko	DF	2								2			
21	(North Macedonia) Darko Velkovski	DF	3								3			
22	(Hungary) Bence Pataki	MF												
23	(Hungary) Márk Kovácsréti	FW	24	6	6		3				27	6	6	
24	(Hungary) Krisztián Keresztes	DF	22	1	3		3		1		25	1	4	
25	(Brazil) Matheus Leoni	DF	6				2	1	1		8	1	1	
27	(Hungary) Márton Eppel	FW	26	4	4		4	1	1		30	5	5	
28	(Serbia) Ognjen Radošević	MF	3				3		2		6		2	
30	(The Gambia) Modou Lamin Marong	FW	3				1				4			
32	(Hungary) Balázs Tóth	GK	25		1		1		1		26		2	
33	(Hungary) Olivér Tamás	DF	7	1		1					7	1		1
44	(Hungary) Ákos Baki	DF	10		5		1				11		5	
44	(Cyprus) Pavlos Korrea	DF	14		4		1		1		15		5	
45	(Serbia) Slobodan Babić	FW	19	3	1		2		1		21	3	2	
55	(Slovenia) Žan Medved	FW	13		1		2				15		1	
66	(Hungary) Barna Benczenleitner	DF	10		1		2		1		12		2	
74	(Slovakia) Patrik Pinte	FW	10				2				12			
77	(Hungary) Barnabás Nagy	DF	32	1	4		3				35	1	4	
88	(Hungary) Bendegúz Farkas	DF	13		1						13		1	
90	(Hungary) Krisztián Kovács	DF	9		1		1				10		1	
93	(Hungary) Barna Kesztyűs	MF	6		1						6		1	
95	(Romania) Béla Fejér	GK	5		1		3				8		1	
Own goals				1								1		
Totals				31	92	4		5	16			36	108	4

=== Clean sheets ===
			Clean sheets		
No.	Player	Games Played	Nemzeti Bajnokság I	Magyar Kupa	Total
32	(Hungary) Balázs Tóth	26	8		8
95	(Romania) Béla Fejér	8	1	1	2
1	(Hungary) Balázs Bese	3			
1	(Hungary) Mátyás Molnár				
Totals			9	1	10
