= 2024–25 Magyar Kupa =

MOL Magyar Kupa
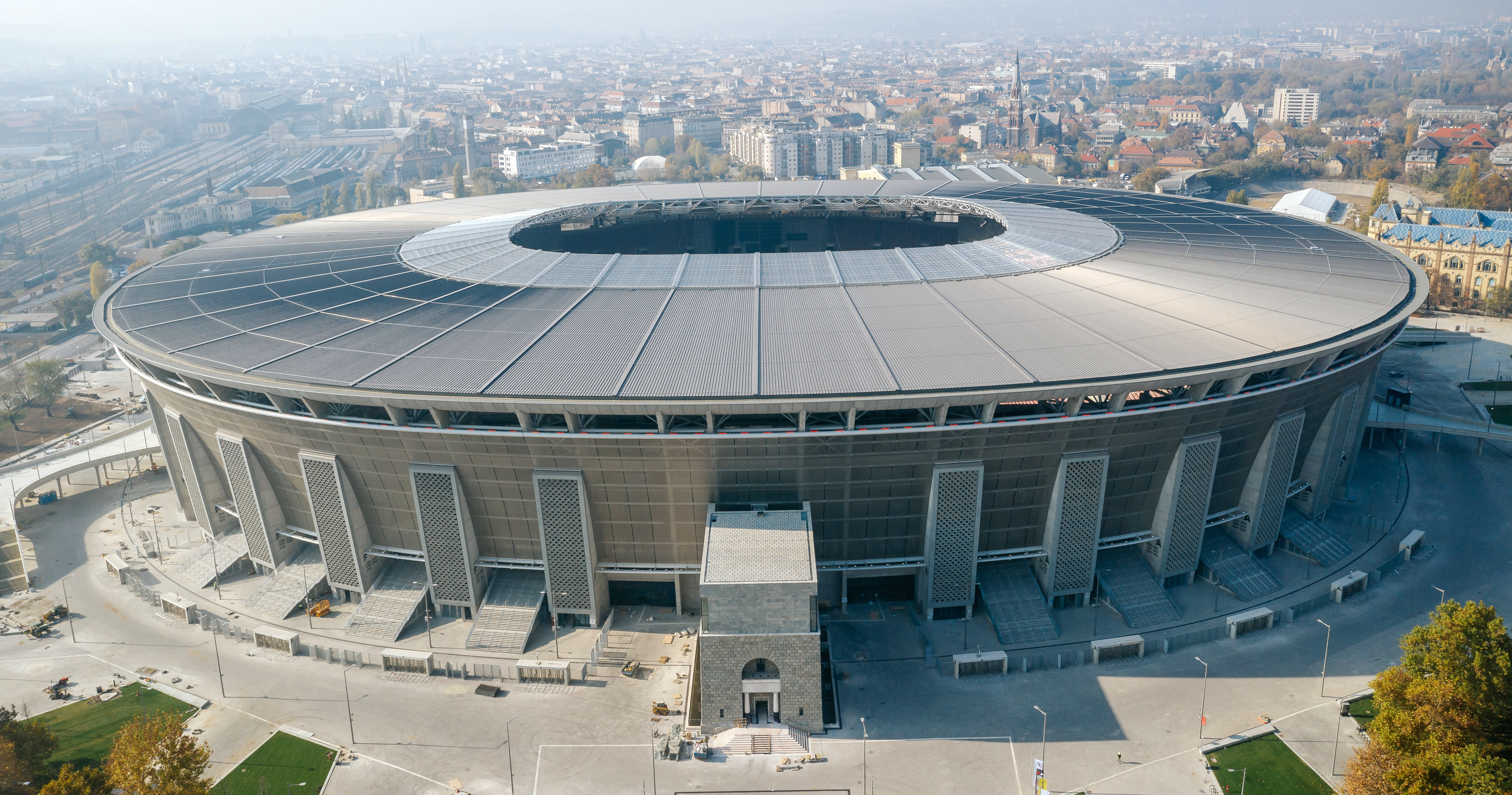
- Puskás Aréna hosted the final

Tournament details
- Country: Hungary
- Dates: 3 August 2024 – 14 May 2025
- Teams: 172

Final positions
- Champions: Paks (2nd title)
- Runners-up: Ferencváros

Tournament statistics
- Top goal scorer: Levente Dávid, Péter Törőcsik (8 each)

The 2024–25 Magyar Kupa (lit. 'Hungarian Cup') was the 85th season of Hungary's annual knock-out cup football competition. MOL was the sponsor of the tournament, thus the sponsored name is MOL Magyar Kupa. The winners qualified for the 2025–26 UEFA Europa League first qualifying round.

== Competition format ==
The Magyar Kupa is played as a knockout tournament. All rounds are played as one-off matches. The final are traditionally held in the Puskás Aréna, Budapest. The competition consists of eighth proper rounds. All rounds are single-match elimination rounds. When tied after 90 minutes first an extra time period of 30 minutes will be played, then penalties are to be taken if still necessary. All rounds will be drawn randomly, usually either at the completion of the previous round discounting any replays or on the evening of the last televised game of a round being played, depending on television broadcasting rights.

== Calendar ==
Round	Main date(s)	Fixtures	Clubs	New entries	Leagues entering
First round	3–4 August 2024	72	144 → 72	144	Nemzeti Bajnokság III and Local teams (MB I, MB II, MB III, MB IV)
Second round	24–25 August 2024	36	72 → 36	none	none
Round of 64 (Third round)	14–15 September 2024	32	64 → 32	28	Nemzeti Bajnokság I and Nemzeti Bajnokság II
Round of 32 (Fourth round)	29–31 October 2024	16	32 → 16	none	none
Round of 16 (Fifth round)	19–27 February 2025	8	16 → 8	none	none
Quarter-finals (Sixth round)	2 April 2025	4	8 → 4	none	none
Semi-finals (Seventh round)	23 April 2025	2	4 → 2	none	none
Final (Eighth round)	14 May 2025	1	2 → 1	none	none

== Participating clubs ==
A total of 172 teams competed in the 2024–25 edition, comprising 12 teams from the Nemzeti Bajnokság I (tier 1), 16 teams from the Nemzeti Bajnokság II (tier 2), 50 teams from the Nemzeti Bajnokság III (tier 3), 83 teams from the Megyei Bajnokság I (tier 4), 8 teams from the Megyei Bajnokság II (tier 5), 2 team from the Megyei Bajnokság III (tier 6) and 1 team from the Megyei Bajnokság IV (tier 7).

Tier	League	No	Teams
1	NB I	12	Debreceni VSC, Diósgyőr, Fehérvár, Ferencváros, Győr, Kecskemét, MTK, Nyíregyháza, Puskás Akadémia, Paks, Újpest, Zalaegerszeg
2	NB II	16	Ajka, Békéscsaba, Budafok, Budapest Honvéd, BVSC-Zugló, Csákvár, Gyirmót, Kazincbarcika, Kisvárda, Kozármisleny, Mezőkövesd, Soroksár, Szeged-Csanád, Szentlőrinc, Tatabánya, Vasas
3	NB III	50	III. Kerületi TVE, Balatonfüred, Bicske, BKV Előre, Bonyhád, Budaörs, Cigánd, Csepel, Dabas, Debreceni EAC, Dorog, Dunaföldvár, Dunaharaszti, Eger, ESMTK Budapest, Érd, Füzesabony, Gárdony, Gyula, Hatvan, Hódmezővásárhely, Iváncsa, Kaposvár, Karcag, Kelenföld, Komárom, Körösladány, Majosi SE (Bonyhád), Martfű, Mátészalka, Monor, Mosonmagyaróvár, Nagykanizsa, Pécsi MFC, Pénzügyőr, PTE-PEAC (Pécs), Putnok, Salgótarján, Sényő, Siófok, Sopron, Szegedi VSE, Szekszárd, Szolnok, Szombathely, Tiszaföldvár, Tiszafüred, Tiszakécske, Tiszaújváros, Veszprém
4	MB I	83	Abda, Algyő, Alsózsolca, Baktalórántháza, Balatonalmádi, Bábolna, Bácsa, Biatorbágy, Bóly, Cegléd, Csesztreg, Csorna, Diósd, Diósjenő, Dunaújváros, Dunavarsány, Ercsi, Füzesgyarmat, Gesztely, Gödöllő, Gyomaendrőd, Gyöngyös, Győrszentiván, Hajdúnánás, Hajdúsámson, Harkány, Harta, Héhalom, Hidasnémeti, Jánoshalom, Jászfényszaru, Kakasd, Kalocsa, Karancslapujtő, Király SZE, Koroncó, Kunbaja, Lajosmizse, Lábatlan, Lovászhetény, Lőrinci, Maklár, Marcali, Mezőörs, Mohács, Monostorpályi, Mór, MVSC-Miskolc, Nagyatád, Nagybajom, Nagyecsed, Nyergesújfalu, Nyíradony, Nyírbátor, Orosházi MTK-ULE, Pápa, Pétfürdő, Pilis, Rákospalota, Sándorfalva, Sárbogárd, Sárisáp, Sárvár, Somogysárd, Söpte, SZAC, Szajol, Szombathelyi MÁV Haladás, Tarpa, Tállya, Teskánd, Tihany, Tiszasziget, Törökszentmiklós, Unione, Újfehértó, Újpalota, Úrkút, Vép, Vitnyéd, Vizslás, Zalalövő, Zalaszentgrót
5	MB II	8	Bakonycsernye, Böde, Fadd, Hímesháza, Mezőmegyer, Pátka, Rábatótfalu, Sárospatak
6	MB III	2	Inter 04, Szakonyfalu
7	MB IV	1	Duna SK

== Matches ==
Times up to 26 October 2024 and from 31 March 2024 are CEST (UTC+2). Times from 27 October 2024 to 29 March 2025 are CET (UTC+1).

=== First round ===
Teams in Tier 3 and below entered the first round.

Number of teams per tier entering this round
Nemzeti Bajnokság I (tier 1) (Note: Nemzeti Bajnokság I and Nemzeti Bajnokság II teams joined the competition in round of 64.)	Nemzeti Bajnokság II (tier 2)	Nemzeti Bajnokság III (tier 3)	Megyei Bajnokság I (tier 4)	Megyei Bajnokság II (tier 5)	Megyei Bajnokság III (tier 6)	Megyei Bajnokság IV (tier 7)	Total
12 / 12	16 / 16	50 / 50	83 / 83	8 / 8	2 / 2	1 / 1	172 / 172

Team 1	Score	Team 2
3 August 2024
Duna SK (7)	3–0 w/o	Körösladány (3)
Balatonalmádi (4)	3–0 w/o	Szombathely (3)
Fadd (5)	3–0 w/o	Diósd (4)
Lovászhetény (4)	0–3 w/o	Somogysárd (4)
Érd (3)	2–0	Dunaföldvár (3)
Nyírbátor (4)	0–4	Mátészalka (3)
Tállya (4)	0–3	Cigánd (3)
Eger (3)	2–0	Sényő (3)
Alsózsolca (4)	1–8	Tiszaújváros (3)
Maklár (4)	1–3	Újfehértó (4)
Diósjenő (4)	1–4	MVSC-Miskolc (4)
Jászfényszaru (4)	5–0	Baktalórántháza (4)
Nagyecsed (4)	0–0 (a.e.t.) (4–5 p)	Tarpa (4)
Lőrinci (4)	0–2	Debreceni EAC (3)
Sárospatak (5)	1–5	Monostorpályi (4)
Hidasnémeti (4)	0–19	Tiszafüred (3)
Hajdúnánás (4)	0–1	Salgótarján (4)
Gyöngyös (4)	0–2	Füzesabony (3)
Gesztely (4)	0–5	Hatvan (3)
Vizslás (4)	0–4	Putnok (3)
Karancslapujtő (4)	2–1	Hajdúsámson (4)
Újpalota (4)	1–0	Algyő (4)
SZAC (4)	5–0	Törökszentmiklós (4)
Szegedi VSE (3)	0–2	BKV Előre (3)
Dunavarsány (4)	2–1	Gyula (3)
Gyomaendrőd (4)	0–7	Dunaharaszti (3)
Harta (4)	6–0	Füzesgyarmat (4)
Rákospalota (4)	0–2	Hódmezővásárhely (3)
Monor (3)	1–0	Pénzügyőr (3)
Sándorfalva (4)	2–4	Tiszakécske (3)
Teskánd (4)	2–9	Mosonmagyaróvár (3)
Söpte (4)	0–1	Abda (4)
Úrkút (4)	2–4	Csesztreg (4)
Sárvár (4)	1–0	Zalalövő (4)
Szakonyfalu (6)	0–22	Mezőörs (4)
Veszprém (3)	1–0	Komárom (3)
Nyergesújfalu (4)	0–3 (a.e.t.)	Szombathelyi MÁV Haladás (4)
Bonyhád (3)	0–0 (a.e.t.) (4–5 p)	PTE-PEAC (Pécs) (3)
Biatorbágy (4)	0–2	Kaposvár (3)
Marcali (4)	2–2 (a.e.t.) (2–4 p)	Ercsi (4)
Dunaújváros (4)	3–1	Unione (4)
III. Kerületi TVE (3)	3–1 (a.e.t.)	Bicske (3)
Nagyatád (4)	3–0	Siófok (3)
Nagykanizsa (3)	1–0	Gárdony (3)
Nagybajom (4)	2–3	Mohács (4)
Király SZE (4)	0–1	Mór (4)
4 August 2024
Kakasd (4)	0–1	Pécsi MFC (3)
Nyíradony (4)	2–3	Gödöllő (4)
Héhalom (4)	0–4	Karcag (3)
Kalocsa (4)	0–2	Tiszasziget (4)
Szajol (4)	0–4	Szolnok (3)
Orosházi MTK-ULE (4)	1–4	Tiszaföldvár (3)
Cegléd (4)	1–4	Csepel (3)
Jánoshalom (4)	4–0	Kunbaja (4)
Mezőmegyer (5)	4–2	Lajosmizse (4)
Dabas (3)	0–2	ESMTK Budapest (3)
Böde (5)	0–6	Vép (4)
Bakonycsernye (5)	1–0	Sárisáp (4)
Tihany (4)	2–3	Csorna (4)
Lábatlan (4)	0–5	Dorog (3)
Bácsa (4)	0–4	Koroncó (4)
Bábolna (4)	1–16	Sopron (3)
Vitnyéd (4)	0–3	Balatonfüred (3)
Győrszentiván (4)	2–4	Pápa (4)
Rábatótfalu (5)	0–6	Zalaszentgrót (4)
Bóly (4)	1–4	Iváncsa (3)
Harkány (4)	1–5	Majosi SE (Bonyhád) (3)
Pétfürdő (4)	1–2	Kelenföld (3)
Sárbogárd (4)	1–2	Budaörs (3)
Pilis (4)	1–3	Martfű (3)
Hímesháza (5)	0–12	Szekszárd (3)
Inter 04 (6)	2–4	Pátka (5)

=== Second round ===
The 72 first round winners entered the second round.

Number of teams per tier entering this round
Nemzeti Bajnokság I (tier 1)	Nemzeti Bajnokság II (tier 2)	Nemzeti Bajnokság III (tier 3)	Megyei Bajnokság I (tier 4)	Megyei Bajnokság II (tier 5)	Megyei Bajnokság III (tier 6)	Megyei Bajnokság IV (tier 7)	Total
12 / 12	16 / 16	37 / 50	30 / 83	4 / 8	0 / 2	1 / 1	100 / 172

Team 1	Score	Team 2
24 August 2024
PTE-PEAC (Pécs) (3)	1–2	Nagykanizsa (3)
Kelenföld (3)	2–0	Szekszárd (3)
Csesztreg (4)	1–2	Mosonmagyaróvár (3)
Duna SK (7)	0–15	Tiszakécske (3)
Mohács (4)	0–3	III. Kerületi TVE (3)
Gödöllő (4)	1–0	Cigánd (3)
Füzesabony (3)	1–0	Tiszaújváros (3)
Tarpa (4)	1–0	Mátészalka (3)
Salgótarján (4)	0–1	Putnok (3)
Monostorpályi (4)	0–3	Debreceni EAC (3)
Újfehértó (4)	0–3	Hatvan (3)
Tiszasziget (4)	1–2	ESMTK Budapest (3)
SZAC (4)	2–1	Martfű (3)
Harta (4)	3–2	Jánoshalom (4)
Szolnok (3)	2–2 (a.e.t.) (3–4 p)	Monor (3)
BKV Előre (3)	5–0	Dunaharaszti (3)
Dunavarsány (4)	4–2	Csepel (3)
Sárvár (4)	1–0	Balatonfüred (3)
Vép (4)	1–3	Dorog (3)
Bakonycsernye (5)	1–9	Csorna (4)
Pápa (4)	5–2	Mór (4)
Mezőörs (4)	2–0	Abda (4)
Koroncó (4)	2–4	Szombathelyi MÁV Haladás (4)
Budaörs (3)	3–2	Majosi SE (Bonyhád) (3)
Nagyatád (4)	1–3	Érd (3)
Ercsi (4)	2–7	Iváncsa (3)
Somogysárd (4)	1–9	Pécsi MFC (3)
Sopron (3)	2–1	Veszprém (3)
25 August 2024
Mezőmegyer (5)	1–4	Hódmezővásárhely (3)
MVSC-Miskolc (4)	2–3	Eger (3)
Karancslapujtő (4)	1–4	Tiszafüred (3)
Jászfényszaru (4)	0–4	Karcag (3)
Újpalota (4)	1–0	Tiszaföldvár (3)
Zalaszentgrót (4)	0–0 (a.e.t.) (4–5 p)	Balatonalmádi (4)
Fadd (5)	1–11	Dunaújváros (4)
Pátka (5)	2–9	Kaposvár (3)

=== Round of 64 ===
The 36 second round winners, the 12 teams in Tier 1, and the 16 teams in Tier 2 entered the Round of 64.
The draw for the Round of 64 was held on 26 August 2024.

Number of teams per tier entering this round
Nemzeti Bajnokság I (tier 1)	Nemzeti Bajnokság II (tier 2)	Nemzeti Bajnokság III (tier 3)	Megyei Bajnokság I (tier 4)	Total
12 / 12	16 / 16	23 / 50	13 / 83	64 / 172

Team 1	Score	Team 2
14 September 2024
Hatvan (3)	0–4	Zalaegerszeg (1)
Dunavarsány (4)	0–7	Újpest (1)
Putnok (3)	2–6	Győr (1)
Hódmezővásárhely (3)	0–2	MTK (1)
Monor (3)	0–2	Fehérvár (1)
Nagykanizsa (3)	2–3 (a.e.t.)	Ajka (2)
Balatonalmádi (4)	0–0 (a.e.t.) (3–1 p)	Pápa (4)
Iváncsa (3)	4–0	Tiszakécske (3)
Mosonmagyaróvár (3)	2–2 (a.e.t.) (5–4 p)	Budaörs (3)
III. Kerületi TVE (3)	0–0 (a.e.t.) (2–4 p)	Kisvárda (2)
Kaposvár (3)	1–1 (a.e.t.) (0–3 p)	Tiszafüred (3)
Eger (3)	0–4	Soroksár (2)
Tarpa (4)	5–0	Harta (4)
Füzesabony (3)	1–2	Szeged (2)
Debreceni EAC (3)	0–2 (a.e.t.)	BVSC-Zugló (2)
Dunaújváros (4)	0–6	Karcag (3)
Kelenföld (3)	1–5	Budapest Honvéd (2)
Újpalota (4)	0–2	Tatabánya (2)
SZAC (4)	1–2	ESMTK Budapest (3)
Sárvár (4)	0–2	Sopron (3)
Vasas (2)	1–1 (a.e.t.) (6–7 p)	Nyíregyháza (1)
Pécsi MFC (3)	3–3 (a.e.t.) (4–5 p)	Szentlőrinc (2)
Dorog (3)	1–0	Érd (3)
Békéscsaba (2)	0–4	Debrecen (1)
Mezőkövesd (2)	3–1	Csákvár (2)
15 September 2024
BKV Előre (3)	1–5	Gyirmót (2)
Csorna (4)	1–2	Gödöllő (4)
Budafok (2)	0–3	Ferencváros (1)
Kozármisleny (2)	0–4	Kecskemét (1)
Szombathelyi MÁV Haladás (4)	0–7	Puskás Akadémia (1)
16 September 2024
Kazincbarcika (2)	2–4 (a.e.t.)	Diósgyőr (1)
9 October 2024
Mezőörs (4)	0–3	Paks (1)

==== Matches ====
14 September 2024	Hatvan (3)	0–4	Zalaegerszeg (1)	Hatvan
15:00 CEST		Report	Mim 5' (pen.); Ipalibo 11'; Evangelou (yellow card) 23'; Fućak 40'; Sanković (yellow card) 55'; Sajbán 65'	Stadium: Hatvani Népkert Sporttelep; Attendance: 600; Referee: Márió Zimmermann

14 September 2024	Dunavarsány (4)	0–7	Újpest (1)	Dunavarsány
15:00 CEST	Vastag (yellow card) 54'; Gubacsi (yellow card) 79'	Report	K. Horváth 10', 60'; Ljujić 17'; Nunes 28'; Fiola 34'; Geiger 40'; Baranyai 70'	Stadium: Dunavarsányi TE Sporttelep; Attendance: 750; Referee: Márton Rúsz

14 September 2024	Putnok (3)	2–6	Győr (1)	Putnok
15:00 CEST	Lőrincz (yellow card) 50' (goal) 65', 73'; Mrva (yellow card) 60'; Máris (yellow card) 64'	Report	Sahli 14'; Štefulj 52' (yellow card) 72' (goal) 90'; Benbouali 53'; Krivokapić 75'; Marku (yellow card) 80'; Gavrić 83'	Stadium: Várady Béla Sportközpont; Attendance: 500; Referee: Tamás Berényi

14 September 2024	Hódmezővásárhely (3)	0–2	MTK (1)	Hódmezővásárhely
15:00 CEST	Zámbori (yellow card) 21'; Simon (yellow card) 72'	Report	Polievka 9'; R. Molnár 90+3'	Stadium: Városi Stadion; Attendance: 600; Referee: Bence Hanyecz
	Penalties
			Beriashvili (yellow card) 32'

14 September 2024	Monor (3)	0–2	Fehérvár (1)	Monor
15:00 CEST	L. Horváth (yellow card) 28'	Report	Katona (yellow card) 16'; M. Kovács (yellow card) 33'; P. Kovács II 42'; B. Kovács 90'	Stadium: Balassi Bálint utcai Stadion; Attendance: 600; Referee: Tamás Takács

14 September 2024	Nagykanizsa (3)	2–3 (2–2) (a.e.t.)	Ajka (2)	Nagykanizsa
15:00 CEST	D. László 11' (yellow card) 116'; B. Lőrincz 43'; Kovalovszki (yellow card) 81'; Lakatos (yellow card) 86'	Report	Jagodics (yellow card) 26'; Tar 29'; Kitl (yellow card) 70'; Csizmadia (yellow card) 79'; Doncsecz 35', 99' (yellow card) 118'; Csemer (yellow card) 102'	Stadium: Nagykanizsai Olajbányász Stadion; Referee: Tamás Móri

14 September 2024	Balatonalmádi (4)	0–0 (a.e.t.) (3–1 p)	Pápa (4)	Balatonalmádi
15:00 CEST	Vincze (yellow card) 25'; L. Németh (yellow card) 77'	Report	N. Németh (yellow card) 20'; Hauser (yellow card) 54'; B. Varga (yellow card) 106'	Stadium: Balatonalmádi Sportközpont; Referee: Attila Szommer
	Penalties
	Lórántfy (penalty scored); Á. Nagy (penalty scored); Hoffer (penalty scored)		(penalty scored) K. Nagy

14 September 2024	Iváncsa (3)	4–0	Tiszakécske (3)	Iváncsa
15:00 CEST	Aradi 44'; Törőcsik 47', 49'; B. Vass 57'; Kasza (yellow card) 83'; Mihály (yellow card) 88'	Report	Csáki (yellow card) 7'; B. Tóth (yellow card) 34'; Géringer (red card) 50'	Stadium: Károlyi István Sporttelep; Referee: Péter Zierkelbach

14 September 2024	Mosonmagyaróvár (3)	2–2 (a.e.t.) (5–4 p)	Budaörs (3)	Mosonmagyaróvár
15:00 CEST	Pongrácz (yellow card) 42'; Czingráber 64' (yellow card) 97'; Lasz (yellow card) 92' (goal) 120'; Kövesdi (yellow card) 100'	Report	Lami (yellow card) 17'; Szedlár 49'; Kunsági (yellow card) 68'; Szamosi (yellow card) 88'; Jász (yellow card) 90'; Schmidtka 105'	Stadium: MTE 1904 Sporttelep; Attendance: 100; Referee: Dávid Juhász
	Penalties
	Pongrácz (penalty scored); Illés (penalty scored); Deák (penalty scored); Oláh (penalty scored); Czingráber (penalty scored)		(penalty scored) Sajbán; (penalty scored) Petneházi; (penalty scored) Szedlár; (penalty scored) Balajti

14 September 2024	III. Kerületi TVE (3)	0–0 (a.e.t.) (2–4 p)	Kisvárda (2)	Budapest
15:00 CEST	Buda (yellow card) 75'; Pálvölgyi (yellow card) 88'	Report	I. Széles (yellow card) 25'; Chlumeczky (yellow card) 51'; Jovičić (red card) 68'; Mešanović (yellow card) 96'; Stefan (yellow card) 107'	Stadium: III. ker. TVE Sporttelep; Attendance: 400; Referee: Gábor Iványi
	Penalties
	Bekker (penalty missed); Fodor (penalty scored); Pálvölgyi (penalty missed); Szalka (penalty scored)		(penalty scored) Mešanović; (penalty scored) Stefan; (penalty scored) Cipetić; (penalty scored) Camaj

14 September 2024	Kaposvár (3)	1–1 (a.e.t.) (0–3 p)	Tiszafüred (3)	Kaposvár
15:00 CEST	Szederkényi (yellow card) 58'; Mazzonetto (yellow card) 73'; Hadaró 77'	Report	Zs. Papp 36'; D. Kovács (yellow card) 58'; Trencsényi (yellow card) 118'; B. Tajti (yellow card) 121'	Stadium: Rákóczi Stadion; Attendance: 250; Referee: Tibor Farkas
	Penalties
	Hadaró (penalty missed); Pusztai (penalty missed); Heil (penalty missed)		(penalty scored) Zs. Pap; (penalty scored) B. Bényei; (penalty scored) Trencsényi

14 September 2024	Eger (3)	0–4	Soroksár (2)	Eger
15:00 CEST	Valkay (yellow card) 44'; Kis-Orosz (yellow card) 65'	Report	Dobos 33'; Köböl 44' (pen.); B. Lovrencsics 50', 57'	Stadium: Szentmarjay Tibor Stadion; Referee: Ákos Takács

14 September 2024	Tarpa (4)	5–0	Harta (4)	Tarpa
15:00 CEST	Herman 5'; Stratan 23', 37'; Bodan (yellow card) 39'; Mykhalchuk 44', 60'; Kolesnyk (yellow card) 62'	Report	T. Fekete (yellow card) 28'; M. Nagy (yellow card) 56'; Ivacs (yellow card) 90'	Stadium: Tarpa Sportcentrum; Referee: Tamás Tóth

14 September 2024	Füzesabony (3)	1–2	Szeged (2)	Füzesabony
15:00 CEST	Orosz (yellow card) 15'; G. Nagy 68'	Report	Harris (yellow card) 2' (goal) 44'; Sarr 72'; Biben (yellow card) 85'	Stadium: Füzesabonyi Sporttelep; Referee: Gergő Muhari

14 September 2024	Debreceni EAC (3)	0–2 (a.e.t.)	BVSC-Zugló (2)	Debrecen
15:00 CEST	Ratku (yellow card) 93'; B. Papp (yellow card) 111'; B. Bárány (yellow card) 118'	Report	Nwachukwu 95'; Kelemen 115' (o.g.); D. Kovács (yellow card) 8'; Hidi (yellow card) 43'; Hesz (yellow card) 96'; Nemes (yellow card) 110'	Stadium: DEAC Sporttelep; Referee: Tamás Ujhelyi

14 September 2024	Dunaújváros (4)	0–6	Karcag (3)	Dunaújváros
15:00 CEST	M. Ferenczi (yellow card) 90'	Report	Székely 5', 50'; Györgye 22' (yellow card) 46'; Győri (yellow card) 59'; Zs. Nagy 78'; Constantinescu 80'; Hornyák 90' (pen.)	Stadium: Dunaújvárosi Stadion; Referee: Máté Horváth

14 September 2024	Kelenföld (3)	1–5	Budapest Honvéd (2)	Budapest
15:00 CEST	D. Szabó (yellow card) 35'; Remili 43' (pen.); G. Szabó (yellow card) 50'	Report	Kámi 16' (o.g.); Z. Medgyes 20'; Pauljević 33'; Farkas 37'; Pekár (yellow card) 76'; Ihrig-Farkas 82'	Stadium: Kelen SC Sporttelep; Referee: Bálint Juhász

14 September 2024	Újpalota (4)	0–2	Tatabánya (2)	Budapest
15:00 CEST		Report	Szegleti 4'; G. Kocsis 19'; Derekas (yellow card) 77'	Stadium: Testvériség SE Sporttelep; Referee: János Dobai

14 September 2024	SZAC (4)	1–2	ESMTK Budapest (3)	Budapest
15:00 CEST	Tompos 4'; Maya (yellow card) 72'	Report	Soós 17' (yellow card) 56'; M. Balogh 86'	Stadium: Deák Ferenc Sporttelep; Referee: Tamás Kovács

14 September 2024	Sárvár (4)	0–2	Sopron (3)	Sárvár
15:00 CEST	Piros (yellow card) 27'; Vajda (yellow card) 36'; B. Kovács (yellow card) 87'; O. László (red card) 90+2'	Report	T. Szabó 63'; Somogyi-Bakos 90+2'; Baumgartner (red card) 24'; P. Weisz (yellow card) 45'	Stadium: Sárvár FC Sporttelep; Referee: Balázs Dévényi

14 September 2024	Vasas (2)	1–1 (a.e.t.) (6–7 p)	Nyíregyháza (1)	Budapest
16:00 CEST	Urblík 8' (yellow card) 28'; M. Tóth (yellow card) 96'; Rácz (yellow card) 96'	Report	B. Tóth (yellow card) 44'; Keita (yellow card) 47'; Eppel 58'; Jokić (yellow card) 96'; Bouard (yellow card) 105'; Navrátil (yellow card) 120'	Stadium: Illovszky Rudolf Stadion; Referee: József Erdős
	Penalties
	Urblík (penalty scored); Könyves (penalty scored); Vida (penalty scored); Lehoczky (penalty scored); M. Tóth (penalty scored); Otigba (penalty scored); Rácz (penalty missed)		(penalty scored) Bouard; (penalty scored) Kovácsréti; (penalty scored) Keresztes; (penalty scored) Baki; (penalty scored) Kvekveskiri; (penalty scored) Navrátil; (penalty scored) B. Nagy

14 September 2024	Pécsi MFC (3)	3–3 (a.e.t.) (4–5 p)	Szentlőrinc (2)	Pécs
18:00 CEST	Zvara (yellow card) 3'; Fejős (yellow card) 22'; Rabatin 42'; Bachesz 75'; Z. Tóth 89' (pen.) (yellow card) 90+1'	Report	Dinnyés 3'; Rab 6' (yellow card) 90+1'; Tóth-Gábor (yellow card) 33' (goal) 51'; Szekszárdi (yellow card) 39'	Stadium: PMFC Stadion; Attendance: 300; Referee: Gábor Kovács
	Penalties
	Ikonomou (penalty scored); Z. Tóth (penalty scored); Füredi (penalty scored); Rabatin (penalty missed); Wirth (penalty scored)		(penalty scored) Poór; (penalty scored) Rab; (penalty scored) Helesh; (penalty scored) Keresztes; (penalty scored) Tóth-Gábor

14 September 2024	Dorog (3)	1–0	Érd (3)	Dorog
18:30 CEST	Bokán 90+3'	Report	Göblyös (yellow card) 16'; Gyurácz (yellow card) 77'; Gál (yellow card) 90'	Stadium: Buzánszky Jenő Stadion; Referee: András Gáspár

14 September 2024	Békéscsaba (2)	0–4	Debrecen (1)	Békéscsaba
19:00 CEST	Szatmári (yellow card) 25'; M. Tóth (yellow card) 60'; Mikló (yellow card) 74'	Report	Bárány 10', 56', 64' (pen.); Lagator (yellow card) 24'; Dzsudzsák 26'	Stadium: Kórház utcai Stadion; Attendance: 2,500; Referee: Gergő Bogár

14 September 2024	Mezőkövesd (2)	3–1	Csákvár (2)	Mezőkövesd
19:00 CEST	Kállai (yellow card) 3'; Bartusz 20', 33'; Bora (yellow card) 56'; Harsányi 71'	Report	Dusinszki (yellow card) 35'; Z. Nagy (yellow card) 60'; Baracskai 65'; Major (yellow card) 79'	Stadium: Városi Stadion; Referee: Márk Szigetvári

15 September 2024	BKV Előre (3)	1–5	Gyirmót (2)	Budapest
15:00 CEST	Bartha (yellow card) 22'; Kerék 65'	Report	Adamcsek 14'; D. Kovács 22' (pen.); M. Katona 40'; Madarász 48'; Lányi 58' (yellow card) 87'	Stadium: Városi Stadion; Referee: Patrik Fehérvári

15 September 2024	Csorna (4)	1–2	Gödöllő (4)	Csorna
15:00 CEST	Márton 44'; Z. Szabó (yellow card) 51'; P. Kovács (yellow card) 85'	Report	Mertse 47'; Tóth-Ilkó (yellow card) 63'; Mertse 81'; D. Nagy (red card) 90+2'	Stadium: Kocsis István Városi Sporttelep; Attendance: 150; Referee: Flórián Holczbauer

15 September 2024	Budafok (2)	0–3	Ferencváros (1)	Budapest
15:30 CEST	Kálnoki-Kis (yellow card) 29'; Kun (yellow card) 40'	Report	Saldanha 61', 71'; Abu Fani 64'	Stadium: Promontor utcai Stadion; Attendance: 2,000; Referee: Mihály Káprály

15 September 2024	Kozármisleny (2)	0–4	Kecskemét (1)	Kozármisleny
17:00 CEST	T. Turi (yellow card) 31'; Cipf (yellow card) 45'; Kosovshchuk (yellow card) 81'	Report	Lukács 22' (pen.), 29'; Vágó 32'; Belényesi (yellow card) 53'; B. Katona 56'	Stadium: Kozármislenyi Stadion; Attendance: 500; Referee: Marcell Derdák

15 September 2024	Szombathelyi MÁV Haladás (4)	0–7	Puskás Akadémia (1)	Szombathely
18:30 CEST	A. Horváth (yellow card) 34'	Report	Golla 4'; Puljić 12'; Plšek (yellow card) 31' (goal) 50'; Kerezsi 63'; Golla 70', 83'; Mondovics 75'	Stadium: Szombathelyi Haladás Sportkomplexum; Attendance: 695; Referee: Bence Csonka

16 September 2024	Kazincbarcika (2)	2–4 (a.e.t.)	Diósgyőr (1)	Kazincbarcika
19:00 CEST	M. Szabó 39', 55'	Report	Jurek 31'; Z. Varga 71'; Rakonjac 95', 109'	Stadium: Kolorcity Aréna; Attendance: 1,120; Referee: Ferenc Karakó

9 October 2024	Mezőörs (4)	0–3 (Note: Before 1 day the match, on 13 September 2024 Mezőörs canceled the match due to the condition of their football pitch. On 18 September 2024 MLSZ Appeals Committee accepted the appeal of the Mezőörs team and scheduled the Mezőörs–Paks match for 9 October 2024.)	Paks (1)	Mezőörs
14:00 CEST	L. Tóth (yellow card) 68'	Report	B. Tóth 26'; Ötvös 50' (pen.); Gyurkits 79'; R. Varga (yellow card) 42'	Stadium: Mezőörsi KSE Sporttelep; Attendance: 1,200; Referee: Attila Molnár

=== Round of 32 ===
The 32 Round of 64 winners entered the Round of 32. The draw for the Round of 32 was held on 16 September 2024.

Number of teams per tier entering this round
Nemzeti Bajnokság I (tier 1)	Nemzeti Bajnokság II (tier 2)	Nemzeti Bajnokság III (tier 3)	Megyei Bajnokság I (tier 4)	Total
12 / 12	10 / 16	7 / 50	3 / 83	32 / 172

Team 1	Score	Team 2
29 October 2024
Mezőkövesd (2)	1–0	Debrecen (1)
30 October 2024
Mosonmagyaróvár (3)	0–3	Győr (1)
BVSC-Zugló (2)	0–1	Újpest (1)
Gödöllő (4)	1–2	Dorog (3)
Tarpa (4)	0–5	Iváncsa (3)
Karcag (3)	1–0	Kecskemét (1)
Balatonalmádi (4)	0–4	Kisvárda (2)
Szentlőrinc (2)	1–2	Zalaegerszeg (1)
Ajka (2)	3–3 (a.e.t.) (2–4 p)	Nyíregyháza (1)
Tatabánya (2)	2–3	Puskás Akadémia (1)
Szeged (2)	0–3	MTK (1)
Sopron (3)	2–2 (a.e.t.) (4–3 p)	Soroksár (2)
Fehérvár (1)	2–1	Diósgyőr (1)
31 October 2024
ESMTK Budapest (3)	1–3 (a.e.t.)	Gyirmót (2)
Tiszafüred (3)	1–2	Ferencváros (1)
Budapest Honvéd (2)	1–5	Paks (1)

==== Matches ====
29 October 2024	Mezőkövesd (2)	1–0	Debrecen (1)	Mezőkövesd
18:00 CET	Kállai (yellow card) 59'; Varjas (yellow card) 64'; Bartusz 79' (pen.)	Report	T. Szűcs (yellow card) 74'; Silue (yellow card) 87'	Stadium: Városi Stadion; Attendance: 1,800; Referee: Péter Zierkelbach

30 October 2024	Mosonmagyaróvár (3)	0–3	Győr (1)	Mosonmagyaróvár
12:30 CET	Illés (yellow card) 70'; Sipos (yellow card) 86'	Report	Krpić (yellow card) 60'; Sahli 67'; Bumba 80'; Škvarka 88'	Stadium: MTE 1904 Sporttelep; Attendance: 800; Referee: Zoltán Kovács

30 October 2024	BVSC-Zugló (2)	0–1	Újpest (1)	Budapest
12:30 CET	Vinícius (yellow card) 71'	Report	Lacoux (yellow card) 13'; Má. Mucsányi 89'	Stadium: BVSC-Zugló Stadion; Attendance: 700; Referee: Ádám Pillók

30 October 2024	Gödöllő (4)	1–2	Dorog (3)	Gödöllő
12:30 CET	Mertse 19'	Report	Gula 47'; Vígh 63'	Stadium: Szűcs Lajos Sportcentrum; Referee: László Lovas

30 October 2024	Tarpa (4)	0–5	Iváncsa (3)	Tarpa
12:30 CET		Report	Törőcsik 29', 43', 78', 88'; Vass 36'	Stadium: Tarpa Sportcentrum; Referee: Tamás Ujhelyi

30 October 2024	Karcag (3)	1–0	Kecskemét (1)	Karcag
12:30 CET	Györgye (yellow card) 35'; Székely 51'; Győri (yellow card) 90+3'	Report	B. Kovács (yellow card) 79'	Stadium: Liget úti Sporttelep; Attendance: 1,000; Referee: Tamás Takács

30 October 2024	Balatonalmádi (4)	0–4	Kisvárda (2)	Balatonalmádi
12:30 CET		Report	G. Molnár 45', 51', 57'; Camaj 68'	Stadium: Balatonalmádi Sportközpont; Referee: Árpád Jakab

30 October 2024	Szentlőrinc (2)	1–2	Zalaegerszeg (1)	Szentlőrinc
12:30 CET	Helesh 31' (pen.)	Report	Mim 71'; Croizet 85' (pen.)	Stadium: Szentlőrinc SE Sporttelep; Attendance: 700; Referee: Tamás Sipos

30 October 2024	Ajka (2)	3–3 (a.e.t.) (2–4 p)	Nyíregyháza (1)	Ajka
17:00 CET	G. Tóth 30'; Csizmadia 47'; Jagodics (yellow card) 61'; Bobál 81' (yellow card) 82'; Garai (yellow card) 84'; Zsolnai (yellow card) 95'	Report	Leoni (yellow card) 14'; Jokić 36'; D. Nagy 62'; Leoni 67'; Radosević (yellow card) 92'; Eppel (yellow card) 99'	Stadium: Városi Sportcentrum; Attendance: 1,000; Referee: Gergely Bana
	Penalties
	P. Horváth (penalty missed); Kenderesi (penalty missed); Bobál (penalty scored); Borsos (penalty scored)		(penalty missed) M. Kovács; (penalty scored) Kovácsréti; (penalty scored) Eppel; (penalty scored) Keresztes; (penalty scored) B. Nagy

30 October 2024	Tatabánya (2)	2–3	Puskás Akadémia (1)	Tatabánya
18:00 CET	Vida 3'; K. Katona (yellow card) 31'; Árvai 59'; Deutsch (yellow card) 70'; Forró (red card) 90+7' (On the bench)	Report	Plšek 17'; Puljić 20'; Maceiras (yellow card) 46'; Nissilä (yellow card) 76'; Vékony 86'; Colley (yellow card) 90+2'	Stadium: Grosics Gyula Stadion; Attendance: 800; Referee: Márió Zimmermann

30 October 2024	Szeged (2)	0–3	MTK (1)	Szeged
18:00 CET		Report	Vékony 25'; Németh 45'; Polievka 47'	Stadium: Szent Gellért Fórum; Attendance: 2,144; Referee: Bence Hanyecz

30 October 2024	Sopron (3)	2–2 (a.e.t.) (4–3 p)	Soroksár (2)	Sopron
18:00 CET	Bolla (yellow card) 54'; T. Szabó 6', 118' (pen.)	Report	Gálfi 27'; F. Dragóner (yellow card) 43'; Köböl 93'; O. Nagy (yellow card) 99'; Mergl (yellow card) 99'; Somfalvi (yellow card) 102'; Tavares (yellow card) 108'; G. Bolla (yellow card) 118'	Stadium: Városi Stadion; Attendance: 650; Referee: Attila Molnár
	Penalties
	Bolla (penalty scored); Reseterits (penalty scored); K. Végh (penalty scored); T. Szabó (penalty scored)		(penalty scored) Köböl; (penalty scored) Tavares; (penalty scored) Á. Halmai

30 October 2024	Fehérvár (1)	2–1	Diósgyőr (1)	Székesfehérvár
20:00 CET	Spandler (yellow card) 43'; Simut 68'; Gradišar 90+5'; Miličević (yellow card) 90+8'	Report	D. Gera (yellow card) 43'; Saničanin 48'	Stadium: Sóstói Stadion; Attendance: 2,338; Referee: Csaba Pintér

31 October 2024	ESMTK Budapest (3)	1–3 (a.e.t.)	Gyirmót (2)	Budapest
12:30 CET	R. Sándor 35'; M. Tóth (yellow card) 43'; Tagai (yellow card) 82'	Report	N. Kiss (yellow card) 39'; J. Molnár 57'; Madarász (yellow card) 81'; R. Horváth (yellow card) 99'; Pyshchur 106', 107' (yellow card) 120'; Csörgő (yellow card) 115'	Stadium: ESMTK Stadion; Attendance: 500; Referee: Márk Szigetvári

31 October 2024	Tiszafüred (3)	1–2	Ferencváros (1)	Tiszafüred
12:30 CET	F. Kalmár 48'	Report	Ben Romdhane (yellow card) 49'; Zachariassen 51', 55'; A. Tóth (yellow card) 70'	Stadium: Lipcsey Elemér Sporttelep; Attendance: 2,000; Referee: Márton Rúsz

31 October 2024	Budapest Honvéd (2)	1–5	Paks (1)	Budapest
20:00 CET	T. Szabó 35'; Nyitrai (yellow card) 61'	Report	Papp 16', 22'; Zimonyi 29' (pen.); Győrfi 30'; B. Tóth 45+2'; Vas (yellow card) 48'; Gyurkits (yellow card) 50'; B. Balogh (yellow card) 81'	Stadium: Bozsik Aréna; Attendance: 2,110; Referee: Imre Kovács

=== Round of 16 ===
The 16 Round of 32 winners entered the Round of 16. The draw for the Round of 16 was held on 31 October 2024.

Number of teams per tier entering this round
Nemzeti Bajnokság I (tier 1)	Nemzeti Bajnokság II (tier 2)	Nemzeti Bajnokság III (tier 3)	Total
9 / 12	3 / 16	4 / 50	16 / 172

Team 1	Score	Team 2
19 February 2025
Gyirmót (2)	0–2	Fehérvár (1)
25 February 2025
Nyíregyháza (1)	1–0	Puskás Akadémia (1)
26 February 2025
Iváncsa (3)	0–2	MTK (1)
Karcag (3)	1–2	Zalaegerszeg (1)
Mezőkövesd (2)	0–3	Paks (1)
Sopron (3)	0–3	Kisvárda (2)
Dorog (3)	0–1	Újpest (1)
27 February 2025
Győr (1)	3–4 (a.e.t.)	Ferencváros (1)

==== Matches ====
19 February 2025	Gyirmót (2)	0–2	Fehérvár (1)	Gyirmót
17:00 CET	M. Katona (yellow card) 42'; Ugrai (yellow card) 76'	Report	Šaponjić 10', 45+1'; G. Nagy (yellow card) 81'	Stadium: Alcufer Stadion; Attendance: 738; Referee: Csaba Pintér

25 February 2025	Nyíregyháza (1)	1–0	Puskás Akadémia (1)	Nyíregyháza
20:00 CET	Jokić 13' (yellow card) 81'; Babić (yellow card) 58'; Radosević (yellow card) 65'; Benczenleitner (yellow card) 90+2'	Report	Vékony (yellow card) 27'	Stadium: Városi stadion Attendance: 2,852; Referee: Gergő Bogár

26 February 2025	Iváncsa (3)	0–2	MTK (1)	Iváncsa
13:00 CET	Pál (yellow card) 29'	Report	Zs. Nagy (yellow card) 23'; Stieber 26'; Horváth 61'	Stadium: Károlyi István Sporttelep; Attendance: 200; Referee: Péter Zierkelbach

26 February 2025	Karcag (3)	1–2	Zalaegerszeg (1)	Karcag
13:00 CET	Szabó (yellow card) 42'; B. Varga (yellow card) 47'; F. Ádám (yellow card) 52'; Caba 77'	Report	Almási 34' (pen.); Nyíri (yellow card) 55'; Safronov (yellow card) 68'; Caba 86' (o.g.); Mim (yellow card) 90'	Stadium: Ligeti úti Sporttelep; Attendance: 1,300; Referee: Mihály Káprály

26 February 2025	Mezőkövesd (2)	0–3	Paks (1)	Mezőkövesd
17:00 CET	Bertus (yellow card) 18'	Report	Windecker (yellow card) 35'; J. Szabó (yellow card) 54'; Győrfi (yellow card) 64'; Ötvös 31' (pen.), 66'; Hinora (yellow card) 80'; R. Varga 85'	Stadium: Városi stadion Attendance: 900; Referee: Imre Kovács

26 February 2025	Sopron (3)	0–3	Kisvárda (2)	Sopron
17:30 CET	D. Tóth (yellow card) 57'	Report	Körmendi (yellow card) 21'; Simon (yellow card) 28'; Puclin (yellow card) 46'; Gyurkó 53', 65'; Soltész 59' (pen.)	Stadium: Városi stadion Attendance: 2,100; Referee: Márió Zimmermann

26 February 2025	Dorog (3)	0–1	Újpest (1)	Dorog
20:00 CET	Erdei (yellow card) 60'; Kálovits (yellow card) 86'; Ferkó (yellow card) 86'; Balla (yellow card) 88'	Report	Beridze 20' (yellow card) 53'; Banai (yellow card) 86'; Brodić (yellow card) 86'; Karamoko (yellow card) 90+4'	Stadium: Buzánszky Jenő Stadion; Attendance: 2,000; Referee: Márton Rúsz

27 February 2025	Győr (1)	3–4 (a.e.t.)	Ferencváros (1)	Győr
20:00 CET	Gavrić 12'; Vitális 52'; Romão 54' (o.g.); Bitri (yellow card) 63'; Krpić (yellow card) 70'; Benbouali (yellow card) 78'; Sahli (yellow card) 90+3'; Anton (yellow card) 108'	Report	Ben Romdhane 33'; Varga 34' (pen.), 50'; Romão (yellow card) 90'; Zachariassen 117'; A. Tóth (yellow card) 110'	Stadium: ETO Park; Attendance: 1,800; Referee: Bence Csonka

=== Quarter-finals ===
The eight Round of 16 winners entered the quarter-finals. The draw for the quarter-finals was held on 27 February 2025.

Number of teams per tier entering this round
Nemzeti Bajnokság I (tier 1)	Nemzeti Bajnokság II (tier 2)	Total
7 / 12	1 / 16	8 / 172

Team 1	Score	Team 2
1 April 2025
Zalaegerszeg (1)	2–0	Nyíregyháza (1)
2 April 2025
Kisvárda (2)	0–1	Paks (1)
Ferencváros (1)	3–1	Újpest (1)
3 April 2025
MTK (1)	4–2	Fehérvár (1)

==== Matches ====
1 April 2025	Zalaegerszeg (1)	2–0	Nyíregyháza (1)	Zalaegerszeg
19:30 CEST	Ipalibo 33' (yellow card) 52'; Várkonyi 67'	Report	Alaxai (yellow card) 13'; Keresztes (yellow card) 38'; Correa (yellow card) 51'; Toma (yellow card) 87'	Stadium: ZTE Arena; Attendance: 1,560; Referee: József Erdős

2 April 2025	Kisvárda (2)	0–1	Paks (1)	Kisvárda
17:00 CEST	G. Molnár (yellow card) 78'	Report	Osváth 71'	Stadium: Várkerti Stadion; Attendance: 1,578; Referee: Márton Rúsz

2 April 2025	Ferencváros (1)	3–1	Újpest (1)	Budapest
19:45 CEST	Pešić 32'; Makreckis 40'; Saldanha 52' (yellow card) 65'; Gartenmann (yellow card) 82'	Report	Brodić (yellow card) 48' (goal) 82'; Geiger (yellow card) 58'; Ljujić (yellow card) 88'	Stadium: Ferencváros Stadion; Attendance: 16,129; Referee: Mihály Káprály

3 April 2025	MTK (1)	4–2	Fehérvár (1)	Budapest
19:30 CEST	Németh 51'; Bognár 55'; Jurina 73'; Miličević 76' (o.g.)	Report	Šekularac 20' (yellow card) 49'; Holender (yellow card) 53'; Má. Kovács (yellow card) 54'; Petrov (yellow card) 75'; Šaponjić 89'	Stadium: Hidegkuti Nándor Stadion; Attendance: 1,600; Referee: Balázs Berke

=== Semi-finals ===
The four quarter-final winners entered the semi-finals. The draw for the quarter-finals was held on 3 April 2025.

Number of teams per tier entering this round
Nemzeti Bajnokság I (tier 1)	Total
4 / 12	4 / 172

Team 1	Score	Team 2
22 April 2025
Paks (1)	2–1	Zalaegerszeg (1)
23 April 2025
Ferencváros (1)	3–1	MTK (1)

==== Matches ====
22 April 2025	Paks (1)	2–1	Zalaegerszeg (1)	Paks
20:00 CEST	Mezei 36'; Hinora (yellow card) 41'; Osváth (yellow card) 50'; Böde 83'	Report	Várkonyi (yellow card) 45'; Evangelou 90+1' (yellow card) 90+3'; Szendrei (yellow card) 90+3'	Stadium: Fehérvári úti Stadion; Attendance: 4,095; Referee: Gergő Bogár

23 April 2025	Ferencváros (1)	3–1	MTK (1)	Budapest
20:00 CEST	Ramírez 45'; Pešić (yellow card) 44' (goal) 51'; Joseph 75'	Report	R. Molnár 16' (yellow card) 90+2'; Beriashvili (yellow card) 44'; P. Kovács I (yellow card) 87'; Kádár (yellow card) 90+3'	Stadium: Ferencváros Stadion; Attendance: 11,057; Referee: Csaba Pintér

=== Final ===
The final was held between the two semi-final winners.

14 May 2025	Ferencváros (1)	1–1 (a.e.t.) (3–4 p)	Paks (1)	Budapest
19:00 CEST	Joseph 90+4'; Abu Fani (yellow card) 90+5' (On the bench); A. Tóth (yellow card) 107'; Szalai (yellow card) 118'	Report	J. Szabó (yellow card) 34'; B. Tóth 45+1'; Ötvös (yellow card) 55'; Böde (yellow card) 88'; Szappanos (yellow card) 94'; Ádám (yellow card) 96'; Kinyik (yellow card) 105+1'	Stadium: Puskás Aréna; Attendance: 54,762; Referee: Csaba Pintér
	Penalties
	Pešić (penalty missed); Zachariassen (penalty scored); Joseph (penalty missed); Gustavo (penalty scored); Cissé (penalty scored)		Windecker (penalty scored); Ádám (penalty scored); Balogh (penalty missed); Gyurkits (penalty scored); Vécsei (penalty scored)

== Bracket ==
Round of 64
27 February 2025
Győr	3
Ferencváros (a.e.t.)	4
26 February 2025
Dorog	0
Újpest	1
26 February 2025
Iváncsa	0
MTK	2
19 February 2025
Gyirmót	0
Fehérvár	2
26 February 2025
Sopron	0
Kisvárda	3
26 February 2025
Mezőkövesd	0
Paks	3
26 February 2025
Karcag	1
Zalaegerszeg	2
25 February 2025
Nyíregyháza	1
Puskás Akadémia	0

Quarter-finals
2 April 2025
Ferencváros	3
Újpest	1
3 April 2025
MTK	4
Fehérvár	2
2 April 2025
Kisvárda	0
Paks	1
1 April 2025
Zalaegerszeg	2
Nyíregyháza	0

Semi-finals
23 April 2025
Ferencváros	3
MTK	1
22 April 2025
Paks	2
Zalaegerszeg	1

Final
14 May 2025
Ferencváros	1
Paks (pen. 4–3)	1

== Statistics ==
=== Top goalscorers ===
As of match played 14 May 2025

Rank	Player	Club	Goals
1	(Hungary) Levente Dávid	Mezőörs	8
1	(Hungary) Péter Törőcsik	Iváncsa	8
2	(Hungary) Tamás Szabó	Sopron	6
3	(Hungary) Tamás Takács	Tiszakécske	5
3	(Hungary) Zoltán Tóth	Pécsi MFC	5
3	(Hungary) Milán Varga	Harta	5
4	(Hungary) Bence Babinszky	Kaposvár	4
4	(Hungary) Zalán Keresztes	Majosi SE (Bonyhád)	4
4	(Hungary) Krisztián Kitl	Hatvan	4
4	(Hungary) László Mácsai	Tiszafüred	4
4	(Hungary) Adrián Márton	Csorna	4
4	(Hungary) Balázs Németh	Csorna	4
4	(Hungary) Viktor Pataki	Tiszafüred	4
4	(Hungary) Marcell Szántó	Mezőörs	4
4	(Hungary) Patrik Weisz	Sopron	4

== See also ==
- 2024–25 Nemzeti Bajnokság I
- 2024–25 Nemzeti Bajnokság II
- 2024–25 Nemzeti Bajnokság III
- 2024–25 Megyei Bajnokság I
