= Péter Horváth =

Péter Horváth may refer to:

- Péter Horváth (swimmer)
- Péter Horváth (chess player)
- Péter Horváth (footballer)
