= Városi Stadion =

Városi Stadion may refer to:

- Városi Stadion in Nyíregyháza, Hungary
- Városi Stadion in Tatabánya, Hungary
- Városi Stadion in Vác, Hungary
- Mezőkövesdi Városi Stadion in Mezőkövesdi, Hungary
