= 2024–25 Nemzeti Bajnokság I =

OTP Bank Liga
- Season: 2024–25
- Dates: 27 July 2024 – 24 May 2025
- Champions: Ferencváros (36th title)
- Relegated: Fehérvár, Kecskemét
- Champions League: Ferencváros
- Europa League: Paks
- Conference League: Puskás Akadémia, Győr
- Matches: 198
- Goals: 553 (2.79 per match)
- Top goalscorer: Böde (15 goals)
- Biggest home win: • Ferencváros 7–0 Nyíregyháza (20 April 2025)
- Biggest away win: • Debrecen 0–5 Paks (20 October 2024)
- Highest scoring: • Debrecen 5–4 Ferencváros (6 December 2024)
- Longest winning run: 6 matches Ferencváros
- Longest unbeaten run: 15 matches Győr
- Longest winless run: 10 matches Újpest
- Longest losing run: 5 matches Debrecen, Fehérvár
- Highest attendance: 19,021; Ferencváros 1–1 Puskás Akadémia (3 May 2025)
- Lowest attendance: 700; Puskás Akadémia 1–1 MTK (6 Apr. 2025)
- Total attendance: 896,939
- Average attendance: 4,530
- All statistics correct as of 25 May 2025.

The 2024–25 Nemzeti Bajnokság I (also known as 2024–25 OTP Bank Liga), also known as NB I, was the 126th season of top-tier football in Hungary. The league was officially named OTP Bank Liga for sponsorship reasons. The fixtures were announced on 20 June 2024. Ferencváros were the 35-time defending champions, having won the previous 6 titles consecutively. They defended their title on the last day of the season.

== Teams ==
=== Changes ===
Twelve teams compete in the league – the top ten teams from the previous season and the two teams promoted from the Nemzeti Bajnokság II.

The promoted teams are Nyíregyháza and Győr, who are returning to the top flight after respective absences of nine years. They replaced Kisvárda and Mezőkövesd, who were relegated to the Nemzeti Bajnokság II after respective spells of six and eight years in the top flight.

=== Stadium and locations ===
Note: Table lists in alphabetical order.

Location of teams in 2024–25 Nemzeti Bajnokság I
Location of teams in Budapest

Team	Location	Stadium	Cap.	2023–24	2024–25
Debrecen	Debrecen	Nagyerdei Stadion	20,340	5th	details
Diósgyőr	Miskolc (Diósgyőr)	Diósgyőri Stadion	15,325	7th	details
Fehérvár	Székesfehérvár	Sóstói Stadion	14,201	4th	details
Ferencváros	Budapest (Ferencváros)	Groupama Aréna	22,043	1st	details
Győr	Győr	ETO Park	15,600	2nd (NB II)	
Kecskemét	Kecskemét	Széktói Stadion	6,320	6th	
Nyíregyháza	Nyíregyháza	Városi Stadion	8,150	1st (NB II)	
MTK	Budapest (Józsefváros)	Hidegkuti Nándor Stadion	5,014	8th	
Puskás Akadémia	Felcsút	Pancho Aréna	3,816	3rd	details
Paks	Paks	Fehérvári úti Stadion	6,150	2nd	details
Újpest	Budapest (Újpest)	Szusza Ferenc Stadion	12,670	10th	details
Zalaegerszeg	Zalaegerszeg	ZTE Aréna	11,200	9th	

Debrecen	Diósgyőr	Fehérvár	Ferencváros
Nagyerdei Stadion	Diósgyőri Stadion	Sóstói Stadion	Groupama Aréna
Capacity: 20,340	Capacity: 15,325	Capacity: 14,201	Capacity: 22,043
Győr	Kecskemét	MTK	Nyíregyháza
ETO Park	Széktói Stadion	Hidegkuti Nándor Stadion	Városi Stadion
Capacity: 15,600	Capacity: 6,320	Capacity: 5,014	Capacity: 8,150
Paks	Puskás Akadémia	Újpest	Zalaegerszeg
Fehérvári úti Stadion	Pancho Aréna	Szusza Ferenc Stadion	ZTE Arena
Capacity: 6,150	Capacity: 3,816	Capacity: 12,670	Capacity: 11,200

==== Number of teams by counties and regions ====
Number of teams by counties
Pos.	County	No. of teams	Teams
1	Budapest	3	Ferencváros, MTK and Újpest
2	Fejér	2	Fehérvár and Puskás Akadémia
3	Bács-Kiskun	1	Kecskemét
3	Borsod-Abaúj-Zemplén	1	Diósgyőr
3	Győr–Moson–Sopron	1	Győr
3	Hajdú-Bihar	1	Debrecen
3	Szabolcs-Szatmár-Bereg	1	Nyíregyháza
3	Tolna	1	Paks
3	Zala	1	Zalaegerszeg

Number of teams by regions
Transdanubia	Central Hungary	Great Plain and North
Fehérvár; Győr; Paks; Puskás Akadémia; Zalaegerszeg	Ferencváros; MTK; Újpest	Debrecen; Diósgyőr; Kecskemét; Nyíregyháza
5 Teams	3 Teams	4 Teams

=== Personnel and kits ===
All teams were obligated to have the logo of the league sponsor OTP Bank as well as the Nemzeti Bajnokság I logo on the right side of their shirt. Hungarian national sports betting brand Tippmix sponsored all 12 teams of the first league since February 2019, their logo were present on all team kits.

Note: Flags indicate national team as has been defined under FIFA eligibility rules. Players and Managers may hold more than one non-FIFA nationality.

Team	Head coach	Captain	Kit maker	Kit sponsors	
Team	Head coach	Captain	Kit maker	Main	Other(s)
Debrecen	(Serbia) Nestor El Maestro	(Hungary) Balázs Dzsudzsák	Adidas	Tranzit-Food	None
Diósgyőr	(Lithuania) Valdas Dambrauskas	(Hungary) Gergő Holdampf	2Rule	Hell	List: Back: Apollo Tyres; Sleeves: Mercedes-Benz Miskolc; Shorts: Duna Aszfalt and Mercedes-Benz Miskolc
Fehérvár	(Hungary) Krisztián Tímár	(Hungary) Csaba Spandler	Adidas	None	
Ferencváros	(Republic of Ireland) Robbie Keane	(Hungary) Dénes Dibusz	Macron	Telekom	List: Front: Superz.; Back: hsagroup; Sleeves: Groupama and MVM; Shorts: MVM and VW
Győr	(Hungary) Balázs Borbély	(Slovakia) Michal Škvarka	Adidas	Kukkonia	None
Kecskemét	(Hungary) Zoltán Gera	(Hungary) Levente Vágó	Kappa	HÉP	List: Back: Kádár Környezetvédelmi Kft.; Sleeves: Hovány; Shorts: Piroska Szörp and Kecskeméti Fürdő
MTK	(Hungary) Dávid Horváth	(Hungary) Mihály Kata	Nike	Prohuman	List: Back: Bayer Construct; Sleeves: HR-Rent
Nyíregyháza	(Hungary) István Szabó	(Hungary) Dominik Nagy	Macron	Révész Group	List: Sleeves: City of Nyíregyháza; Shorts: Prestige Medical Center and VW Autó Széles
Paks	(Hungary) György Bognár	(Hungary) János Szabó	Nike	None	List: Shorts: tarr
Puskás Akadémia	(Slovakia) Zsolt Hornyák	(Hungary) Roland Szolnoki	2Rule	MBH Bank	None
Újpest	(Croatia) Damir Krznar	(Serbia) Matija Ljujić	Puma	MOL	List: Back: 11teamsports; Sleeves: Toyota Schiller
Zalaegerszeg	(Hungary) István Mihalecz	(Hungary) Norbert Szendrei	2Rule	None	List: Back: Pellet Hungary; Shorts: ZÁÉV and Pharos '95

==== Managerial changes ====
Team	Outgoing manager	Manner of departure	Date of vacancy	Position in table	Incoming manager	Date of appointment	Ref.
Ferencváros	(Serbia) Dejan Stanković	Signed by Spartak Moscow	16 May 2024	Pre-season	(Netherlands) Pascal Jansen	16 June 2024	
Újpest	(Hungary) Géza Mészöly	End of interim spell	27 May 2024	Pre-season	(Sweden) Bartosz Grzelak	14 June 2024	
Fehérvár	(Sweden) Bartosz Grzelak	Signed by Újpest	14 June 2024	Pre-season	(Hungary) Tamás Pető	15 June 2024	
Debrecen	(Serbia) Srđan Blagojević	Mutual consent	26 August 2024	9th	(Hungary) Csaba Máté	30 August 2024	
Kecskemét	(Hungary) István Szabó	Sacked	15 October 2024	12th	(Hungary) Zoltán Gera	16 October 2024	
Debrecen	(Hungary) Csaba Máté	Sacked	27 October 2024	11th	(Hungary) Tibor Dombi (caretaker)	27 October 2024	
Debrecen	(Hungary) Tibor Dombi (caretaker)	End of caretaker spell	11 November 2024	11th	(Serbia) Nestor El Maestro	11 November 2024	
Ferencváros	(Netherlands) Pascal Jansen	Signed by New York City FC	6 January 2025	2nd	(Republic of Ireland) Robbie Keane	8 January 2025	
Diósgyőr	(Serbia) Vladimir Radenković	Mutual consent	19 February 2025	4th	(Hungary) Richárd Vincze (caretaker)	19 February 2025	
Diósgyőr	(Hungary) Richárd Vincze (caretaker)	End of caretaker spell	26 February 2025	5th	(Lithuania) Valdas Dambrauskas	26 February 2025	
Nyíregyháza	(Hungary) Krisztián Tímár	Sacked	7 April 2025	11th	(Hungary) István Szabó	8 April 2025	
Fehérvár	(Hungary) Tamás Pető	Sacked	15 April 2025	8th	(Hungary) Krisztián Tímár	15 April 2025	
Zalaegerszeg	(Hungary) Gábor Márton	Sacked	23 April 2025	10th	(Hungary) István Mihalecz	23 April 2025	
Újpest	(Sweden) Bartosz Grzelak	Sacked	3 May 2025	7th	(Croatia) Damir Krznar	5 May 2025	

== League table ==
Pos	Team	Pld	W	D	L	GF	GA	GD	Pts	Qualification or relegation
1	Ferencváros (C)	33	20	9	4	64	31	+33	69	Qualification for the Champions League second qualifying round
2	Puskás Akadémia	33	20	6	7	58	38	+20	66	Qualification for the Conference League second qualifying round
3	Paks	33	16	9	8	65	47	+18	57	Qualification for the Europa League first qualifying round (Note: Paks qualified for the Europa League as the 2024–25 Magyar Kupa winners. As a result, the second Conference League berth was passed to the team in 4th place.)
4	Győr	33	14	11	8	49	37	+12	53	Qualification for the Conference League second qualifying round
5	MTK	33	13	7	13	53	47	+6	46	
6	Diósgyőr	33	11	11	11	43	51	−8	44	
7	Újpest	33	9	14	10	38	44	−6	41	
8	Nyíregyháza	33	9	9	15	31	52	−21	36	
9	Debrecen	33	9	7	17	52	59	−7	34	
10	Zalaegerszeg	33	7	13	13	35	42	−7	34	
11	Fehérvár (R)	33	8	7	18	34	52	−18	31	Relegation to the Nemzeti Bajnokság II
12	Kecskemét (R)	33	4	13	16	31	53	−22	25	Relegation to the Nemzeti Bajnokság II

Source: Hungarian Football Federation (in Hungarian)
Rules for classification: 1) Points; 2) Matches won; 3) Goal difference; 4) Goals scored; 5) Head-to-head points; 6) Head-to-head goal difference; 7) Fair play ranking; 8) Drawing of lots.
(C) Champions; (R) Relegated

== Results ==
Home \ Away	DEB	DIO	FEH	FER	GYO	KEC	MTK	NYI	PAK	PUS	UJP	ZAL	DEB	DIO	FEH	FER	GYO	KEC	MTK	NYI	PAK	PUS	UJP	ZAL
Debrecen		0–1	1–2	5–4	2–2	2–2	2–3	3–1	0–5	1–2	1–2	3–1		4–1		0–1			0–0		0–0			4–3
Diósgyőr	3–1		1–0	0–2	0–0	1–0	0–2	1–2	2–2	2–1	1–1	2–1				1–1	2–4	2–1	2–1		0–2			1–1
Fehérvár	2–0	3–1		1–3	0–1	6–1	1–0	2–0	1–2	1–0	0–1	1–1	0–3	0–0					1–1		0–2			0–2
Ferencváros	2–2	3–3	2–0		2–2	1–0	0–0	2–1	0–2	3–0	1–0	1–0			3–0			4–0		7–0		1–1	2–0	
Győr	0–3	3–4	3–1	1–1		1–2	1–2	1–1	2–1	0–2	3–0	2–0	0–0		1–0	1–2			2–1		2–0	2–0		
Kecskemét	1–1	0–0	0–0	0–1	2–1		5–0	0–2	2–2	0–3	1–3	1–0	1–3		2–2		1–1			2–2		0–1	0–0	
MTK	0–2	4–0	3–2	1–3	2–2	3–1		3–0	3–1	0–1	4–1	1–1				2–3		2–1		3–0	1–2		1–3	
Nyíregyháza	3–2	0–2	3–3	0–1	2–1	0–0	2–0		4–2	0–3	0–0	1–1	1–0	1–0	1–0		0–1					0–2		0–0
Paks	4–3	3–4	2–0	3–1	1–1	1–0	4–2	2–1		2–1	2–1	2–2				2–3		1–1		2–0		2–2	6–1	
Puskás Akadémia	1–0	1–1	3–0	1–0	0–3	4–2	1–0	3–1	3–1		1–1	2–1	4–2	4–3	3–1				1–1					2–1
Újpest	3–0	0–0	4–1	0–0	0–0	1–1	1–2	1–0	0–0	1–2		1–2	2–1	1–1	2–2		2–3			2–2		1–1		
Zalaegerszeg	2–1	2–1	0–1	2–2	1–2	2–1	0–1	0–0	3–1	4–2	0–2					0–2	0–0	0–0	1–1		1–1		0–0	

Updated to match(es) played on 25 May 2025. Source: Hungarian Football Federation (in Hungarian)
Legend: Blue = home team win; Yellow = draw; Red = away team win.
For upcoming matches, an "a" indicates there is an article about the rivalry between the two participants.

== Positions by round ==
The table lists the positions of teams after each week of matches. To preserve chronological evolvements, any postponed matches are not included in the round at which they were originally scheduled, but added to the full round they were played immediately afterwards.

Team ╲ Round	1	2	3	4	5	6	7	8	9	10	11	12	13	14	15	16	17	18	19	20	21	22	23	24	25	26	27	28	29	30	31	32	33
Ferencváros	9	6	4	3	3	2	2	1	2	2	3	3	1	2	2	2	2	1	2	2	2	2	2	2	2	2	1	1	1	1	1	1	1
Puskás Akadémia	3	3	2	1	1	1	1	2	1	1	1	1	2	1	1	1	1	2	1	1	1	1	1	1	1	1	2	2	2	2	2	2	2
Paks	6	5	5	5	5	5	6	4	4	4	4	4	4	4	5	3	5	5	3	3	3	3	3	3	3	3	3	3	3	3	3	3	3
Győr	10	12	12	12	12	12	12	12	11	7	7	8	9	9	9	9	9	8	8	7	7	6	6	6	5	5	5	4	4	4	4	4	4
MTK	4	2	1	2	2	3	3	3	3	3	2	2	3	3	3	5	4	4	5	5	4	4	4	4	4	4	4	5	5	5	5	5	5
Diósgyőr	5	9	11	9	6	8	7	5	5	6	6	5	5	5	4	4	3	3	4	4	5	5	5	5	6	6	6	6	6	6	6	6	6
Újpest	11	10	7	10	7	6	4	6	6	5	5	6	6	6	6	6	6	6	6	6	6	7	7	7	7	7	7	7	7	7	7	7	7
Nyíregyháza	2	7	9	11	11	11	10	8	8	9	9	9	8	8	8	8	8	9	11	10	10	10	10	10	10	11	10	11	9	9	8	8	8
Debrecen	1	1	3	4	4	4	5	7	7	8	10	10	11	11	11	11	11	11	10	11	11	11	12	11	11	10	11	9	11	11	11	10	9
Zalaegerszeg	12	11	8	8	9	9	9	10	10	11	11	11	10	10	10	10	10	10	9	9	9	9	9	9	9	9	9	10	10	10	9	9	10
Fehérvár	7	4	6	7	8	7	8	9	9	10	8	7	7	7	7	7	7	7	7	8	8	8	8	8	8	8	8	8	8	8	10	11	11
Kecskemét	8	8	10	6	10	10	11	11	12	12	12	12	12	12	12	12	12	12	12	12	12	12	11	12	12	12	12	12	12	12	12	12	12

Leader and qualification for the Champions League first qualifying round
Qualification for the Conference League second qualifying round
Relegation to the Nemzeti Bajnokság II

Updated to match(es) played on 25 May 2025. Source: Hungarian Football Federation (in Hungarian)

== Season statistics ==
=== Top goalscorers ===
As of match played 25 May 2025

Rank	Player	Club	Goals
1	(Hungary) Dániel Böde	Paks	15
2	(Hungary) Donát Bárány	Debrecen	13
2	(Bosnia and Herzegovina) Marin Jurina	MTK	13
4	(France) Brandon Domingues	Debrecen	12
4	(Hungary) Zsolt Nagy	Puskás Akadémia	12
4	(Hungary) Barna Tóth	Paks	12
4	(Hungary) Barnabás Varga	Ferencváros	12
8	(Sweden) Jonathan Levi	Puskás Akadémia	11
9	(The Gambia) Lamin Colley	Puskás Akadémia	10
9	(Brazil) Matheus Saldanha	Ferencváros	10

=== Hat-tricks ===
(H) = Home; (A) = Away;

Player	For	Against	Score	Result	Round	Date
(Brazil) Matheus Saldanha	Ferencváros	Puskás Akadémia (H)	1–0 65', 2–0 77', 3–0 82'	3–0	8	29 September 2024
(Hungary) Donát Bárány	Debrecen	Ferencváros (H)	1–0 2', 2–0 5', 3–0 17'	5–4	1	5 December 2024
(Hungary) Barna Tóth^{4}	Paks	Újpest (H)	1–1 25', 2–1 48', 3–1 52', 5–1 68'	6–1	24	14 March 2025
(Hungary) Donát Bárány	Debrecen	Diósgyőr (H)	1–1 25', 2–1 52', 4–1 69' (pen.)	4–1	26	5 April 2025

Note: ^{4} – player scored 4 goals

=== Attendances ===
Ranked by average attendances.

Pos	Team	Total	High	Low	Average	Change
1	Ferencváros	179,774	19,021	6,695	11,236	−0.9%
2	Nyíregyháza	98,224	8,246	1,600	5,778	+818.6%^{1}
3	Diósgyőr	96,715	10,344	3,647	5,689	−11.6%
4	Debrecen	90,887	10,634	2,612	5,680	+5.7%
5	Újpest	95,306	10,273	3,702	5,606	+10.8%
6	Győr	66,907	7,999	1,562	3,936	+87.9%^{1}
7	Fehérvár	52,359	9,160	2,175	3,272	−18.2%
8	MTK	47,591	4,831	1,517	2,974	+6.5%
9	Zalaegerszeg	50,264	6,451	1,623	2,957	−3.0%
10	Paks	46,948	4,500	1,601	2,934	+15.9%
11	Kecskemét	45,710	4,957	1,413	2,689	−8.9%
12	Puskás Akadémia	26,254	3,821	700	1,641	−18.1%
	League total	896,939	19,021	700	4,530	+8.2%

Source: magyarfutball (in Hungarian)
Notes:
1: Team played last season in Nemzeti Bajnokság II

=== Discipline ===
==== Player ====
As of match played 25 May 2025

- Most yellow cards: 13
  - (The Gambia) Lamin Colley (Puskás Akadémia)
  - (Hungary) Attila Fiola (Újpest)
- Most red cards: 2
  - (France) Tom Lacoux (Újpest)
  - (Hungary) Bence Várkonyi (Zalaegerszeg)

==== Club ====
As of match played 25 May 2025

- Most yellow cards: 93
  - Nyíregyháza
- Most red cards: 8
  - Debrecen
- Fewest yellow cards: 53
  - Ferencváros
- Fewest red cards: 1
  - Győr
  - Puskás Akadémia

== Awards ==
=== Monthly awards ===
Month	Player of the Month		Coach of the Month		Ref.
Month	Player	Club	Coach	Club	Ref.
August	(Serbia) Matija Ljujić	Újpest	(Slovakia) Zsolt Hornyák	Puskás Akadémia	
September	(Brazil) Matheus Saldanha	Ferencváros	(Hungary) Krisztián Tímár	Nyíregyháza	
October	(Hungary) Bence Ötvös	Paks	(Hungary) Dávid Horváth	MTK	
November	(Hungary) Gergely Mim	Zalaegerszeg	(Serbia) Vladimir Radenković	Diósgyőr	
February	(Brazil) Maurides	Debrecen	(Hungary) Balázs Borbély	Győr	

=== Yearly awards ===
	Team of the season by M4 Sport				
Goalkeeper			(Hungary) Ármin Pécsi; Puskás Akadémia		
Defenders	(Hungary) Attila Osváth; Puskás Akadémia		(Denmark) Stefan Gartenmann; Ferencváros	(Hungary) Bence Ötvös; Paks	(Croatia) Daniel Štefulj; Győri ETO
Midfielders		(Hungary) Alex Tóth; Ferencváros	(Sweden) Jonathan Levi; Puskás Akadémia		(Hungary) Szabolcs Mezei; Paks
Forwards		(Romania) Claudiu Bumba; Győri ETO	(Hungary) Dániel Böde; Paks		(Hungary) Zsolt Nagy; Puskás Akadémia

	Team of the season by Nemzeti Sport				
Goalkeeper			(Hungary) Ármin Pécsi; Puskás Akadémia		
Defenders	(Hungary) Gábor Vas; Paks		(Denmark) Stefan Gartenmann; Ferencváros	(Hungary) Bence Lenzsér; Paks	(Croatia) Daniel Štefulj; Győri ETO
Midfielders		(Cape Verde) Laros Duarte; Puskás Akadémia	(Sweden) Jonathan Levi; Puskás Akadémia		(Hungary) Kristóf Papp; Paks
Forwards		(Hungary) Attila Osváth; Paks	(Hungary) Dániel Böde; Paks		(Hungary) Zsolt Nagy; Puskás Akadémia

== See also ==
- 2024–25 Magyar Kupa
- 2024–25 Nemzeti Bajnokság II
- 2024–25 Nemzeti Bajnokság III
- 2024–25 Megyei Bajnokság I
