= Városi Stadion (Nyíregyháza) =

Multi-purpose stadium in Nyíregyháza, Hungary

Coordinates: 47°58′13″N 21°42′46″E

Nyíregyháza Városi Stadion
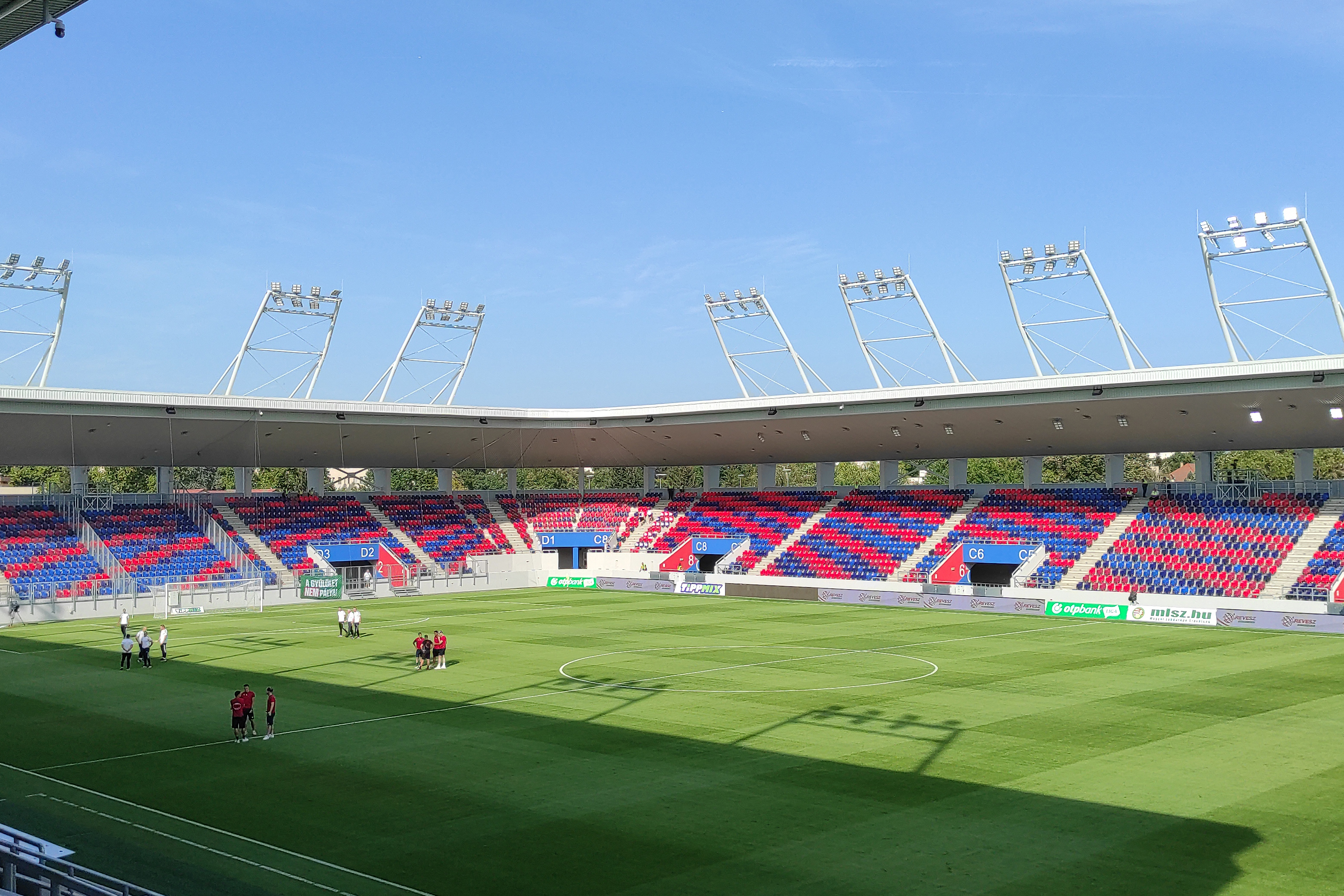
- UEFA
- Interactive map of Nyíregyháza Városi Stadion
- Full name: Városi Stadion
- Location: Nyíregyháza, Hungary
- Owner: City of Nyíregyháza
- Capacity: 8,150
- Surface: Grass
- Record attendance: 8,150 (Nyíregyháza–Debrecen, 21 September 2024)
- Field size: 105 m × 68 m (344 ft × 223 ft)

Construction
- Groundbreaking: 2021
- Built: 2021–2024
- Opened: 25 August 2024
- Cost: 17.5 billion HUF

Tenant
- Nyíregyháza Spartacus

Városi Stadion is a multi-purpose stadium in Nyíregyháza, Hungary. It is used mostly for football matches and is the home stadium of Nyíregyháza Spartacus.

== History ==
On 26 September 2020, it was announced that the planning of the new stadium could start. The capacity of the new stadium will be 8,150.

On 11 January 2021, the design of the new stadium was revealed by StadiumDB.

In an article published by Magyar Narancs, the residents of Nyíregyháza were not necessarily happy with the construction of a new stadium during the COVID-19 pandemic.

In May 2021, Épkar Zrt. and Wetland Generál Kft. signed the contract to obtain the permissions to build the stadium, to complete the design of the stadium, and prepare the construction.

In June 2021, it was also announced that Nyíregyháza would play their home matches at the Balmazújvárosi Városi Sportpálya. An exception was when Nyíregyháza hosted Szeged-Csanád Grosics Akadémia on the 38 match day of the 2022–23 Nemzeti Bajnokság II season at the Várkerti Stadion on 27 May 2023. The reason for the move was that the Balmazújvárosi Városi Sportpálya was one the stadiums used for the 2023 UEFA European Under-17 Championship.

On 23 August 2021, the demolition of the old stadium started. The main entrepreneurs were Építő- és épületkarbantartó Zrt. and NYÍR-WETLAND Generál Zrt. The construction was financed by the Hungarian government in the National Stadium Development Program.

On 11 February 2022, the construction of the new stadium started. Ferenc Kovács, mayor of Nyiregyháza, said that the new stadium would be a UEFA category 2 stadium. At the ceremony for opening the building, Tünde Szabó, Secretary of State for Sports of the Ministry of Human Resources, and Roland Szabó were also present.

On 14 March 2024, the interior of the stadium was revealed.

On 14 May 2024, it was announced that the stadium would be completed for the start of the 2024–25 Nemzeti Bajnokság I season. According to Magyar Építők, only the turf was missing from the stadium.

It was revealed by Átlátszó that the cost increased by 3 billion HUF.

On 21 August 2024, it was announced that Nyíregyháza would be able to host Fehérvár in the new stadium.

On 25 August 2024, Nyíregyháza hosted Fehérvár on the 5th match day of the 2024–25 Nemzeti Bajnokság I.

On 21 September 2024, a record attendance was set in a Nemzeti Bajnokság I match against Debreceni VSC in which 8,000 spectators were present.

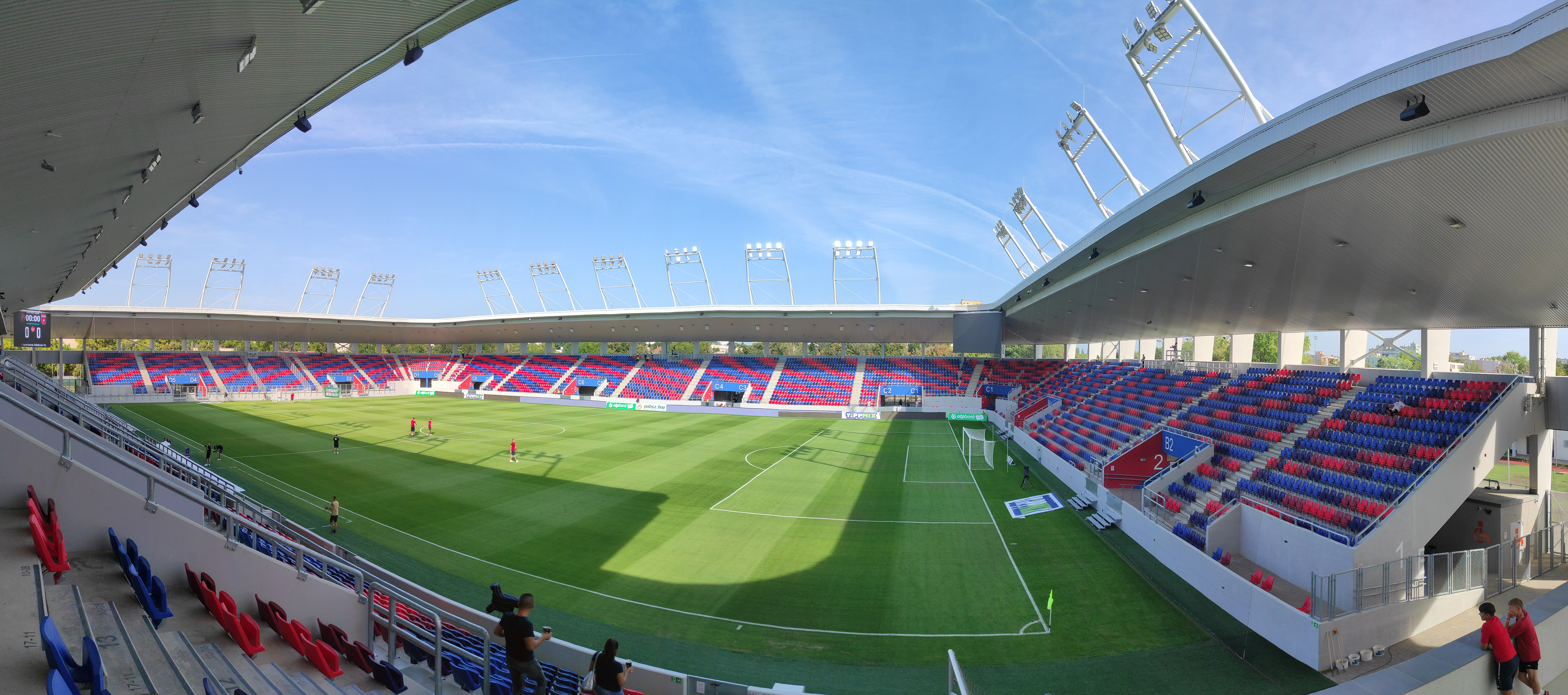
A panorama of Városi Stadion in 2024

== Cost ==
On 14 May 2021, it was revealed that the costs of the construction would be 14 billion HUF.

The original cost of the construction was set to 10.32 billion HUF in order to build a UEFA II category stadium with covered stands. Surprisingly, in the fall of 2021, the winner bidder was Épkar Zrt with a 13.7 billion HUF offer. Later, the cost was modified to 19.1 billion HUF.

== Milestone matches ==
25 August 2024	Nyíregyháza	3–3	Fehérvár	(First Nemzeti Bajnokság I match)
17:45 UTC+2	Eppel 5'; Kovácsréti 40'; Babić 88'	Report	Gradišar 45'; Mi. Kovács 61' (o.g.); Alaxai 85' (o.g.)	Attendance: 7,800; Referee: Tamás Bognár (Hungary)

25 February 2025	Nyíregyháza	1–0	Puskás Akadémia	(First Magyar Kupa match)
19:00 UTC+2	Jokić 13'	Report		Attendance: 2,852; Referee: (Hungary)
