= Viktor Pongrácz =

Hungarian footballer (born 1995)

- Pongrácz playing for Mosonmagyaróvár in 2026

Personal information
- Date of birth: 18 September 1995 (age 31)
- Place of birth: Dunajská Streda, Slovakia
- Height: 1.71 m (5 ft 7 in)
- Position: Defensive midfielder

Team information
- Current team: Mosonmagyaróvár
- Number: 66

Youth career
- 2006–2014: Győri ETO

Senior career*
Years	Team	Apps	(Gls)
2015–2018	Győri ETO	71	(1)
2015	→ Pápa (loan)	9	(0)
2018–2019	Balmazújváros	18	(1)
2019–2020	Szeged	12	(0)
2020	Mosonmagyaróvár	2	(0)
2020–2024	Tiszakécske	86	(7)
2024–	Mosonmagyaróvár	62	(5)

International career
2014	Hungary U-20	2	(0)
- * Club domestic league appearances and goals as of 19 September 2026

Viktor Pongrácz (born 18 September 1995) is a Hungarian professional footballer who plays as a defensive midfielder for Nemzeti Bajnokság III club Mosonmagyaróvár.

== Career ==
=== Pápa ===
On 28 February 2015, Pongrácz played his first match for Pápa in a 2–3 loss against Kecskemét in the Hungarian League.

=== Club ===
As of 19 May 2019

Appearances and goals by club, season and competition
Club	Season	League		Cup		League Cup		Europe		Total	
Club	Season	Apps	Goals	Apps	Goals	Apps	Goals	Apps	Goals	Apps	Goals
Pápa
Pápa	2014–15	9	0	0	0	0	0	–	–	9	0
Pápa	Total	9	0	0	0	–	–	–	–	9	0
Győr
Győr	2013–14	0	0	0	0	1	0	–	–	1	0
Győr	2014–15	0	0	0	0	1	0	–	–	1	0
Győr	2015–16	24	0	1	0	–	–	–	–	25	0
Győr	2016–17	27	0	3	0	–	–	–	–	30	0
Győr	2017–18	20	1	2	0	–	–	–	–	22	1
Győr	Total	71	1	6	0	2	0	–	–	79	1
Balmazújváros
Balmazújváros	2018–19	18	1	0	0	–	–	–	–	18	1
Balmazújváros	Total	18	1	0	0	0	0	–	–	18	1
Career total		98	2	6	0	2	0	0	0	106	2
