= Péter Horváth (chess player) =

Hungarian chess grandmaster (born 1972)

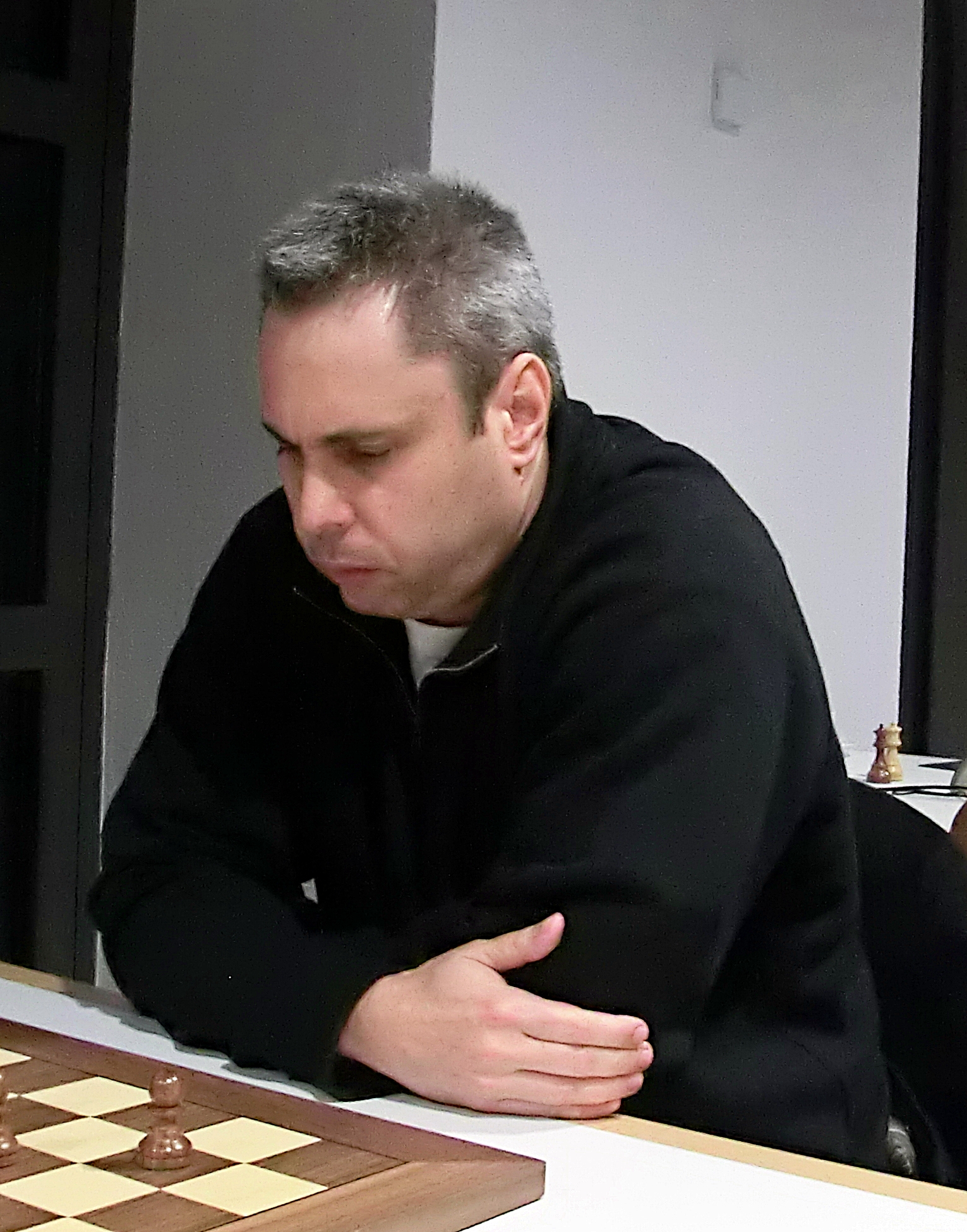

Personal information
- Born: June 17, 1972 (age 54) Pécs, Hungary

Chess career
- Country: Hungary
- Title: Grandmaster (2006)
- Peak rating: 2514 (July 2002)

Péter Horváth is a Hungarian chess grandmaster.

== Chess career ==
He achieved the Grandmaster title in 2006, earning his norms at the:

- Casino Seefeld Open in September 2001
- Hungarian National Team Championship Super League in April 2004
- Open Villa de Benasque in July 2005

In 2011, he was part of the Hungarian team that finished 4th in the Mitropa Cup.
