= Milán Tóth =

Hungarian footballer (born 2002)

Personal information
- Date of birth: 6 February 2002 (age 24)
- Place of birth: Ózd, Hungary
- Height: 1.79 m (5 ft 10 in)
- Position: Forward

Team information
- Current team: Vasas
- Number: 77

Youth career
- 2011: Kazincbarcika
- 2011–2013: Sajóvölgye Focisuli
- 2013–2018: Győri ETO FC
- 2018–2019: Illés Akadémia

Senior career*
Years	Team	Apps	(Gls)
2019–2022	Szombathelyi Haladás	61	(13)
2022–2023	Sturm Graz II	27	(13)
2023–	Vasas	89	(41)

International career^{‡}
2018	Hungary U16	2	(0)
2018	Hungary U17	1	(0)
2022–2023	Hungary U21	4	(0)
2026–	Hungary	4	(1)
- * Club domestic league appearances and goals as of 8 October 2026 ‡ National team caps and goals as of 8 October 2026

Milán Tóth (born 6 February 2002) is a Hungarian professional footballer, who plays as a forward for Nemzeti Bajnokság I club Vasas, and the Hungary national team.

== Career ==
Tóth played his first professional game on 6 November 2019 against Nemzeti Bajnokság II club Vác FC, at the age of 17.

On 27 June 2022, he goes to play abroad for the first time as he signs for 2. Liga club Sturm Graz II.

On 7 August 2023, he goes back to Hungary as he signs for Vasas. The club is promoted back to Nemzeti Bajnokság I at the end of the 2025–2026 season.

On 15 September 2026, he is called for the first time to Hungary national football team for the upcoming UEFA Nations League games. He scores is first senior international goal against Ukraine on 5 October 2026, on a 2–1 win.

== Personal life ==
His younger brother Balázs Tóth is also a professional football goalkeeper at Nyíregyháza Spartacus. He should not be confused with Balázs Tóth, goalkeeper of Blackburn Rovers and the Hungarian national team.

=== International ===
As of match played on 5 October 2026

Appearances and goals by national team and year
National team	Year	Apps	Goals
Hungary	2026	4	1
Total		4	1

Scores and results list Hungary's goal tally first, score column indicates score after each Tóth goal.

List of international goals scored by Milán Tóth
No.	Date	Venue	Cap	Opponent	Score	Result	Competition
1	5 October 2026	Anton Malatinský Stadium, Trnava, Slovakia	4	Ukraine	1–0	2–1	2026–27 UEFA Nations League B

== Honours ==
Vasas SC

- Nemzeti Bajnokság II: 2025–26
