= Áron Alaxai =

Hungarian footballer (born 2003)

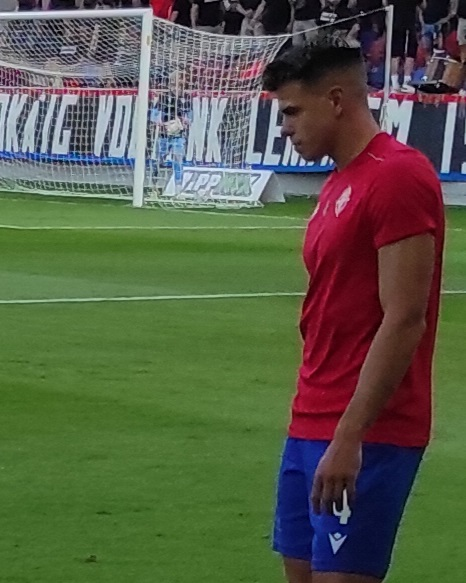
- Alaxai with Nyíregyháza in 2024

Personal information
- Date of birth: 11 April 2003 (age 23)
- Place of birth: Miskolc, Hungary
- Height: 1.81 m (5 ft 11 in)
- Position: Defender

Team information
- Current team: Paks (on loan from Nyíregyháza)
- Number: 4

Youth career
- 2011–2014: Eger Plutó
- 2014–2016: Mezőkövesd
- 2016–2021: Puskás Akadémia

Senior career*
Years	Team	Apps	(Gls)
2020–2023	Puskás Akadémia II	23	(0)
2022–2023	→ Csákvár (loan)	28	(0)
2023–	Nyíregyháza	67	(3)
2026–	→ Paks (loan)	6	(0)

International career^{‡}
2018	Hungary U15	2	(0)
2019	Hungary U16	1	(0)
2020	Hungary U17	2	(0)
2021–2022	Hungary U19	3	(0)
2022–2024	Hungary U21	2	(0)
- * Club domestic league appearances and goals as of 30 May 2026 ‡ National team caps and goals as of 21 March 2024

Áron Alaxai (born 11 April 2003) is a Hungarian professional footballer, who plays as a defender for Nemzeti Bajnokság I club Paks, on loan from Nyíregyháza. He represented Hungary at youth level.

== Career ==
=== Nyíregyháza ===
On 24 June 2023, Alaxai signed a two-year deal with Nemzeti Bajnokság II club Nyíregyháza. He was part of the Nyíregyháza side that saw promotion to the Nemzeti Bajnokság I on 5 May 2024, starting in the 31st round, where they defeated Gyirmót 3–1 at Balmazújvárosi Városi Sportpálya to take the side into Hungary's first football tier after 9 years of absence. Alaxai extended his contract for a further 3 years on 23 January 2025, with hopes to become a stable member of the team and play for Hungary internationally.

== Career statistics ==
As of match played 23 August 2025

Appearances and goals by club, season and competition
Club	Season	League			Magyar Kupa		Total	
Club	Season	Division	Apps	Goals	Apps	Goals	Apps	Goals
Puskás Akadémia II	2020–21	Nemzeti Bajnokság III	1	0	—		1	0
Puskás Akadémia II	2021–22	Nemzeti Bajnokság III	22	0	—		22	0
Puskás Akadémia II	Total		23	0	—		23	0
Csákvár (loan)	2022–23	Nemzeti Bajnokság II	28	0	1	1	29	1
Nyíregyháza	2023–24	Nemzeti Bajnokság II	26	3	3	0	29	3
Nyíregyháza	2024–25	Nemzeti Bajnokság I	30	0	4	0	34	0
Nyíregyháza	2025–26	Nemzeti Bajnokság I	4	0	0	0	4	0
Nyíregyháza	Total		60	3	7	0	67	3
Career total			111	3	8	1	119	4

== Honours ==
Nyíregyháza

- Nemzeti Bajnokság II: 2023–24
