= Krisztián Keresztes =

Hungarian footballer (born 2000

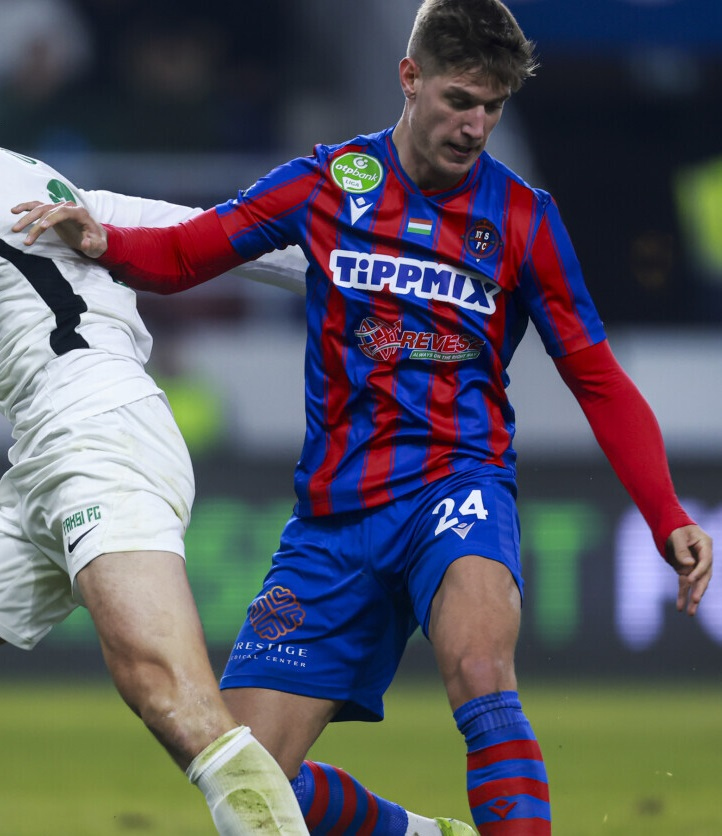
- Keresztes playing for Nyíregyháza Spartacus in 2024

Personal information
- Date of birth: 4 January 2000 (age 26)
- Place of birth: Szombathely, Hungary
- Height: 1.95 m (6 ft 5 in)
- Position: Defender

Team information
- Current team: Greuther Fürth (on loan from Nyíregyháza Spartacus)
- Number: 29

Youth career
- –2010: Lurkó UFC
- 2010–2018: Haladás

Senior career*
Years	Team	Apps	(Gls)
2019	Ajka	4	(0)
2019–2020	Sárvári	14	(1)
2020–2021	Sopron	35	(4)
2021–2022	Dorogi	30	(1)
2023	Győr	23	(1)
2024	DAC Dunajská Streda	0	(0)
2024	Šamorín	1	(0)
2024–	Nyíregyháza Spartacus	22	(0)
2025–2026	→ Dundee United (loan)	35	(3)
2026–	→ Greuther Fürth (loan)	0	(0)
- * Club domestic league appearances and goals as of 20 May 2026

Krisztián Keresztes (born 4 January 2000) is a Hungarian professional footballer who plays as a defender for 2. Bundesliga club Greuther Fürth, on loan from Nemzeti Bajnokság I club Nyíregyháza Spartacus.

== Career ==
Keresztes started his career with Hungarian side FC Ajka in 2019. The same year, he signed for Hungarian side Sárvári FC. One year later, he signed for Hungarian side FC Sopron. In 2021, he signed for Hungarian side Dorogi FC, where he made 30 league appearances and scored one goal. 18 months later, he signed for Hungarian side Győri ETO FC, where he made 23 league appearances and scored one goal and captained the club.

Following his stint there, he signed for Slovak side DAC Dunajská Streda in February 2024, on a contract until the end of 2025. He made zero league appearances and scored zero goals there, before signing for Slovak side FC ŠTK 1914 Šamorín the same year, where he made one league appearance and scored zero goals. In September 2024, he signed for Hungarian side Nyíregyháza Spartacus, where he made 22 league appearances and scored one important goal that helped the club avoid relegation and achieve eighth place in the Nemzeti Bajnokság I. In July 2025, he signed for Scottish side Dundee United on a season-long loan. On 25 July 2026, Keresztes moved on a new loan to Greuther Fürth in Germany, with an option to buy.
