= Bence Várkonyi =

Hungarian footballer (born 2002)

- Várkonyi with Qarabağ in 2026

Personal information
- Date of birth: 18 March 2002 (age 24)
- Place of birth: Budapest, Hungary
- Height: 1.87 m (6 ft 2 in)
- Position: Centre back

Team information
- Current team: Qarabağ
- Number: 4

Youth career
- –2013: Dalnoki Akadémia
- 2013–2021: MTK Budapest

Senior career*
Years	Team	Apps	(Gls)
2021–2024	MTK Budapest	14	(0)
2023	→ Kozármisleny (loan)	17	(1)
2023–2024	→ Zalaegerszeg (loan)	13	(0)
2024–2026	Zalaegerszeg	58	(1)
2026–	Qarabağ	7	(0)
- * Club domestic league appearances and goals as of 17 October 2026

Bence Várkonyi (born 18 March 2002) is a Hungarian professional footballer who plays as a defender for Azerbaijan Premier League club Qarabağ FK.

== Career ==
Várkonyi was born in Budapest and joined Dalnoki Akadémia. He joined MTK Budapest in 2013, progressing through every age-group team within the club's youth system.

On 3 July 2026, Várkonyi joined Azerbaijan Premier League club Qarabağ FK, signing a three-year contract.
