= Balázs Tóth (footballer, born 2004) =

Hungarian footballer

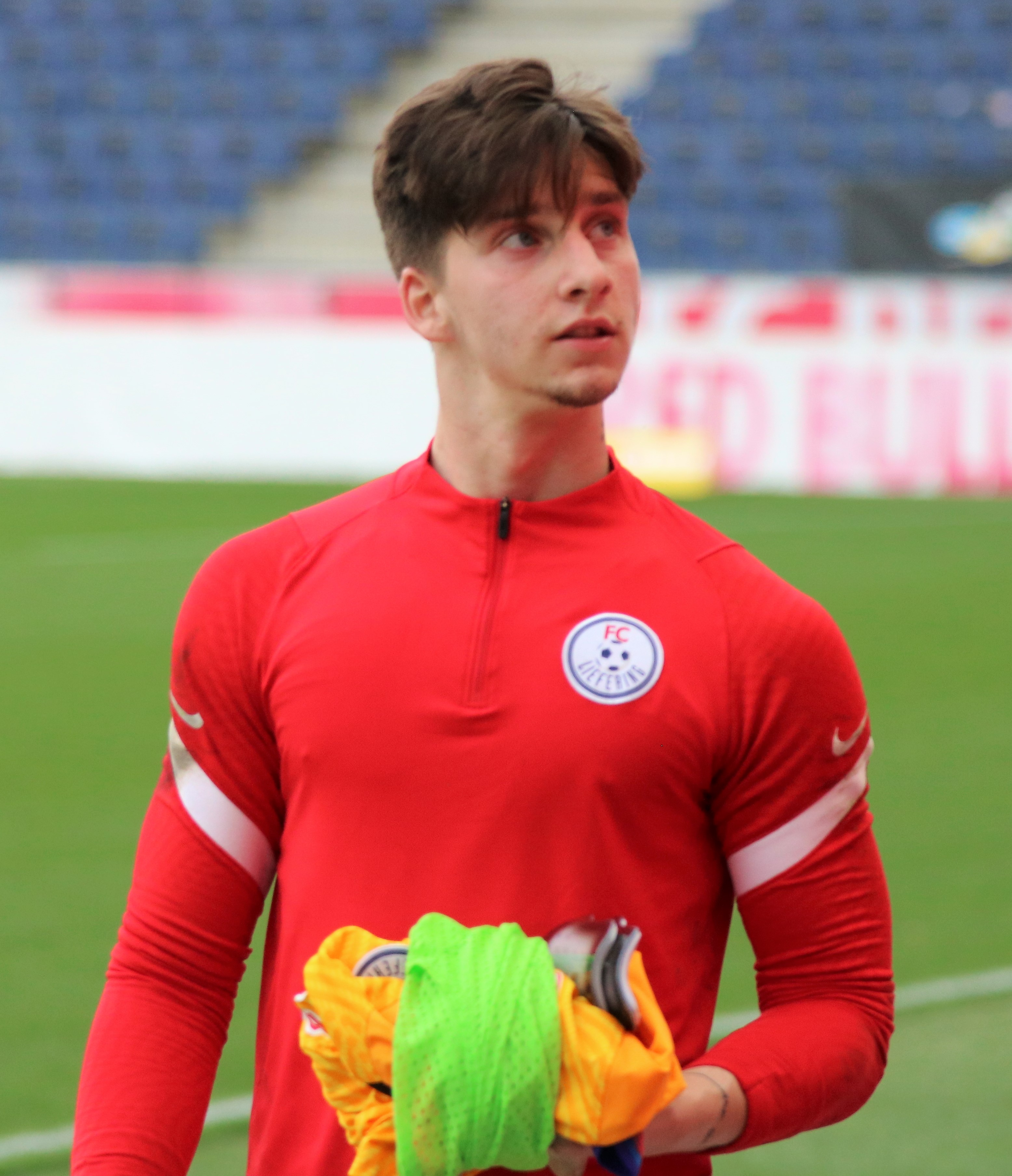

Personal information
- Date of birth: 29 April 2004 (age 22)
- Place of birth: Ózd, Hungary
- Height: 1.87 m (6 ft 2 in)
- Position: Goalkeeper

Team information
- Current team: Nyíregyháza Spartacus
- Number: 32

Youth career
- 2013–2016: Sajovolgye FSE
- 2016–2018: ETO FC Győr
- 2018–2020: Haladás
- 2020–2021: Red Bull Salzburg

Senior career*
| Years | Team | Apps | (Gls) |
| 2021–2024 | FC Liefering | 6 | (0) |
| 2023–2024 | → Kazincbarcikai SC (loan) | 24 | (0) |
| 2024 | Diósgyőri VTK | 0 | (0) |
| 2024– | Nyíregyháza Spartacus | 25 | (0) |

International career^{‡}
| 2018 | Hungary U15 | 1 | (0) |
| 2019 | Hungary U16 | 1 | (0) |
- * Club domestic league appearances and goals as of 19 June 2025 ‡ National team caps and goals as of 29 July 2022

Balázs Tóth (born 29 April 2004) is a Hungarian professional footballer who plays as a goalkeeper for NB I club Nyíregyháza Spartacus.

== Club career ==
In July 2023, Tóth joined Kazincbarcikai SC on loan.

On 8 January 2024, Tóth signed with Diósgyőri VTK.

== Personal life ==
Tóth is the brother of fellow professional footballer Milán Tóth, who plays for Vasas.

== Career statistics ==
=== Club ===
As of 29 July 2022.

| Club | Season | League | | | Cup | | Continental | | Other | | Total | |
| Club | Season | Division | Apps | Goals | Apps | Goals | Apps | Goals | Apps | Goals | Apps | Goals |
|---|---|---|---|---|---|---|---|---|---|---|---|---|
| FC Liefering | 2021–22 | 2. Liga | 1 | 0 | 0 | 0 | – | | 0 | 0 | 1 | 0 |
| Career total | | | 1 | 0 | 0 | 0 | 0 | 0 | 0 | 0 | 1 | 0 |
