= Péter Horváth (footballer) =

Hungarian footballer

Personal information
- Date of birth: 12 February 1992 (age 34)
- Place of birth: Szekszárd, Hungary
- Height: 1.88 m (6 ft 2 in)
- Position: Forward

Team information
- Current team: Kozármisleny
- Number: 15

Youth career
- 2002–2007: Szekszárd
- 2007–2013: Vasas

Senior career*
Years	Team	Apps	(Gls)
2011–2017	MTK	10	(0)
2011–2013	→ Szekszárd (loan)	47	(32)
2014	→ Siófok (loan)	13	(5)
2014–2015	→ Sopron (loan)	30	(8)
2015–2016	→ Szolnok (loan)	6	(1)
2016–2017	→ Sopron (loan)	13	(1)
2017–2018	Sopron	26	(13)
2018–2019	Paks	6	(0)
2019	→ Siófok (loan)	15	(10)
2019–2023	Siófok	117	(25)
2023–	Kozármisleny	60	(13)
- * Club domestic league appearances and goals as of 10 June 2025

Péter Horváth (born 12 February 1992) is a Hungarian football player who plays for Kozármisleny.

== Club career ==
On 1 July 2017 Horvath moved from MTK Budapest FC to Soproni VSE on a free transfer.

== Career statistics ==
Appearances and goals by club, season and competition
Club	Season	League			Cup		League Cup		Europe		Total	
Club	Season	Division	Apps	Goals	Apps	Goals	Apps	Goals	Apps	Goals	Apps	Goals
Szekszárd
Szekszárd	2011–12	Nemzeti Bajnokság III	26	17	2	0	—		—		28	17
Szekszárd	2012–13	Nemzeti Bajnokság III	21	15	2	3	—		—		23	18
Szekszárd	Total		47	32	4	3	0	0	0	0	51	35
MTK	2013–14	Nemzeti Bajnokság I	10	0	0	0	5	2	—		15	2
Siófok	2013–14	Nemzeti Bajnokság II	13	5	0	0	—		—		13	5
Sopron
Sopron	2014–15	Nemzeti Bajnokság II	30	8	1	0	6	2	—		37	10
Sopron	2016–17	Nemzeti Bajnokság II	13	1	3	1	—		—		16	2
Sopron	2017–18	Nemzeti Bajnokság II	26	13	0	0	—		—		26	13
Sopron	Total		69	22	4	1	6	2	0	0	79	25
Szolnok	2015–16	Nemzeti Bajnokság II	6	1	2	0	—		—		8	1
Paks	2018–19	Nemzeti Bajnokság I	6	0	1	0	—		—		7	0
Career total			151	60	11	4	11	4	0	0	173	68

Updated to games played as of 8 December 2018.
