= 2024–25 Kecskeméti TE season =

Kecskemét
2024–25 season
- Manager: István Szabó (until 15 October 2024); Zoltán Gera (from 16 October 2024)
- Stadium: Széktói Stadion
- Nemzeti Bajnokság I: 12th (relegated)
- Magyar Kupa: Round of 32
- Top goalscorer: League: Driton Camaj; Dániel Lukács (5 each); All: Dániel Lukács (7)
- Highest home attendance: 4,743 v Újpest (1 September 2024, Nemzeti Bajnokság I)
- Lowest home attendance: 1,413 v Nyíregyháza (28 September 2024, Nemzeti Bajnokság I)
- Average home league attendance: 2,689
- Biggest win: 5–0 v MTK (Home, 15 February 2025, Nemzeti Bajnokság I)
- Biggest defeat: 1–6 v Fehérvár (Away, 3 November 2024, Nemzeti Bajnokság I)
Home colours	Away colours	Third colours

The 2024–25 season was Kecskeméti Torna Egylet's 10th competitive season, 3rd consecutive season in the Nemzeti Bajnokság I and 111th season in existence as a football club. In addition to the domestic league, Kecskemét participated in that season's editions of the Magyar Kupa.

== Squad ==
Squad at end of season

Note: Flags indicate national team as defined under FIFA eligibility rules; some limited exceptions apply. Players may hold more than one non-FIFA nationality.

No.	Pos.	Nation	Player
1	GK	HUN	Kristóf Pálfi
3	FW	HUN	Dániel Lukács
4	MF	HUN	Bertalan Bocskay
6	DF	HUN	Levente Katona
7	FW	HUN	Gergő Pálinkás
8	MF	HUN	Bence Banó-Szabó
9	FW	HUN	Milán Májer
10	MF	HUN	Krisztián Nagy
11	MF	HUN	Barnabás Kovács
12	DF	HUN	Lóránd Pászka
15	DF	HUN	Alex Szabó
16	MF	HUN	Levente Vágó
17	FW	HUN	Marcell Berki
18	DF	HUN	Csaba Belényesi

No.	Pos.	Nation	Player
19	DF	HUN	Endre Botka
20	GK	HUN	Bence Varga
21	DF	UKR	Mykhaylo Ryashko
22	FW	MNE	Driton Camaj
23	MF	UKR	Mykhaylo Meskhi
27	MF	HUN	Donát Zsótér
29	FW	ESP	Tòfol Montiel
32	FW	ARG	Michael López
46	GK	HUN	Roland Kersák
55	MF	HUN	Bálint Katona
74	MF	HUN	Imre Polyák
77	DF	HUN	Márió Zeke
90	MF	HUN	Márton Vattay

== Transfers ==
=== Transfers in ===
Transfer window	Pos.	No.	Player	From
Summer	GK	1	(Hungary) Kristóf Pálfi	(Hungary) Dorog
Summer	MF	4	(Hungary) Bertalan Bocskay	Free agent (Note: Previous club Honvéd.)
Summer	MF	11	(Hungary) Barnabás Kovács	(Hungary) Zalaegerszeg
Summer	FW	17	(Hungary) Marcell Berki	(Hungary) Fehérvár
Summer	DF	21	(Ukraine) Mykhaylo Ryashko	Free agent (Note: Previous club Nyíregyháza.)
Summer	DF	24	(Hungary) Milán Papp	(Hungary) Kazincbarcika
Summer	FW	29	(Spain) Tòfol Montiel	Free agent (Note: Previous club Alzira.)
Summer	DF	72	(Hungary) Máté Kotula	Free agent (Note: Previous club Kazincbarcika.)
Summer	MF	90	(Hungary) Márton Vattay	(Hungary) Putnok
Winter	FW	22	(Hungary) Driton Camaj	Free agent (Note: Previous club Kisvárda.)
Winter	FW	32	(Argentina) Michael López	(Finland) Lahti

=== Transfers out ===
Transfer window	Pos.	No.	Player	To
Summer	MF	–	(Hungary) Zoltán Bodor	(Hungary) Siófok
Summer	GK	1	(Hungary) Tamás Fadgyas	(Hungary) Kazincbarcika
Summer	DF	4	(Hungary) Attila Grünvald	(Hungary) Tiszakécske
Summer	DF	21	(Brazil) Matheus Leoni	(Hungary) Nyíregyháza
Summer	MF	22	(Hungary) Pál Helmich	(Hungary) Újpest
Summer	DF	26	(Hungary) Kornél Szűcs	(England) Plymouth Argyle
Summer	MF	31	(Hungary) Bence Kiss	(Hungary) Zalaegerszeg
Winter	MF	44	(Hungary) Tamás Nikitscher	(Spain) Valladolid

=== Loans in ===
Transfer window	Pos.	No.	Player	From	End date
Summer	MF	55	(Hungary) Bálint Katona	(Hungary) Ferencváros	End of season
Winter	DF	12	(Hungary) Lóránd Pászka	(Hungary) Ferencváros	End of season
Winter	DF	19	(Hungary) Endre Botka	(Hungary) Ferencváros	End of season

=== Loans out ===
Transfer window	Pos.	No.	Player	To	End date
Summer	MF	19	(Hungary) Zoltán Derekas	(Hungary) Tatabánya	End of season
Winter	MF	14	(Hungary) Kolos Kovács	(Hungary) Békéscsaba	End of season
Winter	DF	24	(Hungary) Milán Papp	(Hungary) Gyirmót	End of season
Winter	DF	72	(Hungary) Máté Kotula	(Hungary) Szeged	End of season

== Competitions ==
=== Overview ===
Competition	First match	Last match	Starting round	Final position	Record							
Competition	First match	Last match	Starting round	Final position	Pld	W	D	L	GF	GA	GD	Win %
Nemzeti Bajnokság I	28 July 2024	23 May 2025	Matchday 1	12th	33	4	13	16	31	53	−22	12.12
Magyar Kupa	15 September 2024	30 October 2024	Round of 64	Round of 32	2	1	0	1	4	1	+3	50.00
Total					35	5	13	17	35	54	−19	14.29

Source: Competitions

=== Nemzeti Bajnokság I ===
==== League table ====
Pos	Team	Pld	W	D	L	GF	GA	GD	Pts	Qualification or relegation
8	Nyíregyháza	33	9	9	15	31	52	−21	36	
9	Debrecen	33	9	7	17	52	59	−7	34	
10	Zalaegerszeg	33	7	13	13	35	42	−7	34	
11	Fehérvár (R)	33	8	7	18	34	52	−18	31	Relegation to the Nemzeti Bajnokság II
12	Kecskemét (R)	33	4	13	16	31	53	−22	25	Relegation to the Nemzeti Bajnokság II

Source: Hungarian Football Federation (in Hungarian)
Rules for classification: 1) Points; 2) Matches won; 3) Goal difference; 4) Goals scored; 5) Head-to-head points; 6) Head-to-head goal difference; 7) Fair play ranking; 8) Drawing of lots.
(R) Relegated

==== Results summary ====
Overall								Home						Away					
Pld	W	D	L	GF	GA	GD	Pts	W	D	L	GF	GA	GD	W	D	L	GF	GA	GD
33	4	13	16	31	53	−22	25	3	8	6	18	22	−4	1	5	10	13	31	−18

Source: Hungarian Football Federation

==== Results by round ====
Round	1	2	3	4	5	6	7	8	9	10	11	12	13	14	15	16	17	18	19	20	21	22	23	24	25	26	27	28	29	30	31	32	33
Ground	H	A	H	H	A	H	A	H	A	H	A	A	H	A	A	H	A	H	A	H	A	H	H	A	H	H	A	H	A	H	A	H	A
Result	D	L	D	W	L	L	L	L	L	L	L	L	L	D	W	D	D	W	D	W	L	D	D	L	L	D	L	D	D	D	L	L	D
Position	8	8	10	6	10	10	11	11	12	12	12	12	12	12	12	12	12	12	12	12	12	12	11	12	12	12	12	12	12	12	12	12	12
Points	1	1	2	5	5	5	5	5	5	5	5	5	5	6	9	10	11	14	15	18	18	19	20	20	20	21	21	22	23	24	24	24	25

Source: Matches
A = Away; H = Home; W = Win; D = Draw; L = Loss

==== Matches ====
28 July 2024 1	Kecskemét	0–0	Fehérvár	Kecskemét
18:50 CEST (UTC+2)	K. Szűcs (yellow card) 55'; Ba. Kovács (yellow card) 63'; L. Katona (yellow card) 90+5'; Nikitscher (yellow card) 90+5'	Report	Huszti (red card) 86'; Gradišar (yellow card) 90+4'; Schön (yellow card) 90+5'; Serafimov (yellow card) 90+5'	Stadium: Széktói Stadion; Attendance: 3,586; Referee: Tamás Bognár; Assistant referees: Vencel Tóth II, Zoltán Horváth; Fourth official: Csaba Pintér

3 August 2024 2	Ferencváros	1–0	Kecskemét	Budapest
19:45 CEST (UTC+2)	Traoré 22'	Report	Vattay (yellow card) 90+5'	Stadium: Groupama Arena; Attendance: 14,095; Referee: Gergő Bogár; Assistant referees: Balázs Buzás, Gergely Becséri; Fourth official: Ádám Pillók

9 August 2024 3	Kecskemét	1–1	Debrecen	Kecskemét
18:50 CEST (UTC+2)	L. Katona (yellow card) 30'; A. Szabó (yellow card) 44'; Vágó 45+3', (yellow card) 50'	Report	Domingues 19'; Szuhodovszki (yellow card) 47'; Dzsudzsák (yellow card) 50'; Ferenczi (red card) 62'; T. Szűcs (yellow card) 90+4'	Stadium: Széktói Stadion; Attendance: 3,835; Referee: Dr. Bence Csonka; Assistant referees: Dániel Szalai, Bence Péter Belicza; Fourth official: Ferenc Karkó

16 August 2024 4	Kecskemét	2–1	Győr	Kecskemét
20:00 CEST (UTC+2)	Nikitscher 9', 45+3'; Ba. Kovács (yellow card) 29'; Vágó (yellow card) 44'; Meskhi (yellow card) 58'; Kersák (yellow card) 82'	Report	Gavrić (yellow card) 4'; Csontos (yellow card) 22'; Diarra 90'; Boldor (yellow card) 90+5'	Stadium: Széktói Stadion; Attendance: 2,702; Referee: Marcell Derdák; Assistant referees: István Szécsényi, Péter Ország; Fourth official: Ádám Pillók

24 August 2024 5	Diósgyőr	1–0	Kecskemét	Miskolc
16:45 CEST (UTC+2)	Klimovich (yellow card) 24'; Acolatse 74'; Lund (yellow card) 90+2'; D. Gera (yellow card) 90+6'	Report	A. Szabó (yellow card) 16'; Derekas (yellow card) 84'; Ba. Kovács (yellow card) 90+3'	Stadium: Diósgyőri Stadion; Attendance: 4,121; Referee: Balázs Berke; Assistant referees: Vencel Tóth II, Balázs Szert; Fourth official: Ferenc Karakó

1 September 2024 6	Kecskemét	1–3	Újpest	Kecskemét
15:00 CEST (UTC+2)	L. Katona 30'	Report	Gergényi (yellow card) 22'; Má. Mucsányi 34'; Brodić 64'; Ljujić 76'; Nunes (yellow card) 84'	Stadium: Széktói Stadion; Attendance: 4,743; Referee: József Erdős; Assistant referees: Georgiou Theodoros, József Aradi; Fourth official: Marcell Derdák

21 September 2024 7	Zalaegerszeg	2–1	Kecskemét	Zalaegerszeg
14:30 CEST (UTC+2)	Sajbán 23'; Csóka 69'	Report	Lukács 34'; Ryashko (yellow card) 57'; Zeke (yellow card) 63'; Belényesi (yellow card) 73'	Stadium: ZTE Arena; Attendance: 2,567; Referee: Péter Zierkelbach; Assistant referees: Gergely Becséri, Dávid Rózsa; Fourth official: Marcell Derdák

28 September 2024 8	Kecskemét	0–2	Nyíregyháza	Kecskemét
17:00 CEST (UTC+2)	Belényesi (yellow card) 7'; Ryashko (yellow card) 33'; Bocskay (yellow card) 43'; K. Nagy (yellow card) 61'; Szabó (yellow card) 82'; Pálinkás (yellow card) 83'; Montiel (yellow card) 90+5'	Report	D. Nagy (yellow card) 12'; Kovácsréti 27'; Navrátil 42'; Toma (yellow card) 52'; Keita (yellow card) 83'	Stadium: Széktói Stadion; Attendance: 1,413; Referee: Marcell Derdák; Assistant referees: Balázs Huszár, Ákos Berényi; Fourth official: Imre Kovács

5 October 2024 9	MTK	3–1	Kecskemét	Budapest
17:00 CEST (UTC+2)	Kosznovszky 18'; R. Molnár 22'; Beriashvili 87'	Report	Lukács 13', (yellow card) 54'; L. Katona (yellow card) 40'; Vágó (yellow card) 63'; K. Nagy (yellow card) 68'	Stadium: Hidegkuti Nándor Stadion; Attendance: 2,432; Referee: Mihály Káprály; Assistant referees: Balázs Szert, Balázs Buzás; Fourth official: Balázs Berke

20 October 2024 10	Kecskemét	0–3	Puskás Akadémia	Kecskemét
13:00 CEST (UTC+2)	Zsótér (yellow card) 16'; A. Szabó (yellow card) 58'; Pálinkás (yellow card) 70'; Be. Varga (yellow card) 75'	Report	Szolnoki (yellow card) 18'; Colley 31', (yellow card) 49'; Zsol. Nagy 36' (pen.); Nissilä 75'	Stadium: Széktói Stadion; Attendance: 2,359; Referee: Balázs Berke; Assistant referees: Georgiou Theodoros, Róbert Horváth; Fourth official: József Erdős

27 October 2024 11	Paks	1–0	Kecskemét	Paks
15:15 CET (UTC+1)	Ötvös 50' (pen.)	Report	K. Nagy (yellow card) 34'; Meskhi (yellow card) 45'; Vágó (yellow card) 90+3'; Be. Varga (yellow card) 90+5'	Stadium: Fehérvári úti Stadion; Attendance: 2,650; Referee: Marcell Derdák; Assistant referees: István Albert, Bence Péter Belicza; Fourth official: Tamás Bognár

3 November 2024 12	Fehérvár	6–1	Kecskemét	Székesfehérvár
17:00 CET (UTC+1)	B. Szabó 18'; Bedi (yellow card) 45'; Gradišar 68'; Stefanelli 71', 90+2'; Kalmár 81'; Csongvai 90+5'	Report	Pálinkás 11', (yellow card) 44'; A. Szabó (yellow card) 20'; Ryashko (yellow card) 56'; Be. Varga (red card) 88'	Stadium: Sóstói Stadion; Attendance: 2,683; Referee: Márton Rúsz; Assistant referees: Zoltán Horváth, Péter Ország; Fourth official: Ádám Pillók

10 November 2024 13	Kecskemét	0–1	Ferencváros	Kecskemét
18:00 CET (UTC+1)	L. Katona (yellow card) 35'; Pálinkás (yellow card) 49'; Ryashko (yellow card) 49'; Bocskay (yellow card) 63'	Report	Kady (red card) 63'; Kehinde 85'	Stadium: Széktói Stadion; Attendance: 4,732; Referee: Mihály Káprály; Assistant referees: Georgiou Theodoros, Dániel Szalai; Fourth official: Péter Zierkelbach

24 November 2024 14	Debrecen	2–2	Kecskemét	Debrecen
17:45 CET (UTC+1)	T. Szűcs (yellow card) 14'; Bárány 17'; Szuhodovszki 80'	Report	Belényesi (yellow card) 4'; Pálinkás 29'; Ba. Kovács (yellow card) 51'; Lukács 55', (yellow card) 90+4'; Nikitscher (yellow card) 90'; Berki (yellow card) 90+1'; Bocskay (yellow card) 90+3'	Stadium: Nagyerdei Stadion; Attendance: 2,612; Referee: Tamás Bognár; Assistant referees: Balázs Huszár, Ákos Berényi; Fourth official: Dr. Bence Csonka

30 November 2024 15	Győr	1–2	Kecskemét	Győr
14:30 CET (UTC+1)	Szépe (yellow card) 7'; Sahli 50'	Report	Ba. Kovács 30'; A. Szabó (yellow card) 66'; Lukács 75'; Kersák (yellow card) 76'; Z. Gera (manager) (yellow card) 87'; Nikitscher (yellow card) 90+8'	Stadium: ETO Park; Attendance: 2,342; Referee: Márton Rúsz; Assistant referees: Balázs Buzás, Péter Ország; Fourth official: Gergő Bogár

7 December 2024 16	Kecskemét	0–0	Diósgyőr	Kecskemét
13:30 CET (UTC+1)	Belényesi (yellow card) 17'; A. Szabó (yellow card) 46'; Vágó (yellow card) 63'	Report	Bárdos (yellow card) 36'	Stadium: Széktói Stadion; Attendance: 2,415; Referee: József Erdős; Assistant referees: István Szécsényi, Dániel Szalai; Fourth official: Imre Kovács

15 December 2024 17	Újpest	1–1	Kecskemét	Budapest
13:00 CET (UTC+1)	Baranyai (yellow card) 15'; Dénes 48'; Má. Mucsányi (yellow card) 72'; Fiola (yellow card) 84'	Report	Zsótér 45+1'; Ba. Kovács (yellow card) 51'	Stadium: Szusza Ferenc Stadion; Attendance: 150; Referee: Ferenc Karakó; Assistant referees: Georgiou Theodoros, Balázs Szert; Fourth official: Péter Zierkelbach

2 February 2025 18	Kecskemét	1–0	Zalaegerszeg	Kecskemét
17:30 CET (UTC+1)	Berki (red card) 66'; Vágó (yellow card) 81'; Pálinkás 90+4' (pen.)	Report	Kiss (yellow card) 55'; Sanković (yellow card) 81'; Esiti (yellow card) 84'	Stadium: Széktói Stadion; Attendance: 2,563; Referee: Dr. Csonka Bence; Assistant referees: Dániel Szalai, Dávid Rózsa; Fourth official: Imre Kovács

8 February 2025 19	Nyíregyháza	0–0	Kecskemét	Nyíregyháza
14:30 CET (UTC+1)	Keita (red card) 25'; Kovácsréti (yellow card) 56'; Korrea (yellow card) 67'	Report	L. Katona (yellow card) 17'; Zeke (yellow card) 30'	Stadium: Városi Stadion; Attendance: 4,058; Referee: Péter Zierkelbach; Assistant referees: Balázs Szalai, Gergely Becséri; Fourth official: József Erdős

15 February 2025 20	Kecskemét	5–0	MTK	Kecskemét
14:30 CET (UTC+1)	B. Katona 19', 69'; Zeke 27'; Májer 45+1'; Camaj 87'	Report	Kata (yellow card) 80'; Bobál (yellow card) 90+1'; Kosznovszky (yellow card) 90+3'	Stadium: Széktói Stadion; Attendance: 1,543; Referee: Tamás Bognár; Assistant referees: Zoltán Horváth, Bence Péter Belicza; Fourth official: József Erdős

22 February 2025 21	Puskás Akadémia	4–2	Kecskemét	Felcsút
14:30 CET (UTC+1)	Nissilä 6'; Zsol. Nagy 20'; Levi 30'; Colley (yellow card) 58'; Arutyunyan (yellow card) 61'; Favorov 90'	Report	Zsótér 48'; Belényesi (yellow card) 58'; Zeke 59'	Stadium: Pancho Aréna; Attendance: 1,042; Referee: József Erdős; Assistant referees: Georgiou Theodoros, Ákos Berényi; Fourth official: Péter Zierkelbach

2 March 2025 22	Kecskemét	2–2	Paks	Kecskemét
16:30 CET (UTC+1)	Vágó (yellow card) 23'; Camaj 37', 71' (pen.)	Report	Ötvös (yellow card) 10', (goal) 57'; Ádám 35'; Lenzsér (yellow card) 41'; Windecker (yellow card) 81'	Stadium: Széktói Stadion; Attendance: 2,541; Referee: Márton Rúsz; Assistant referees: Bence Péter Belicza, Péter Ország; Fourth official: Eszter Urbán

7 March 2025 23	Kecskemét	2–2	Fehérvár	Kecskemét
20:00 CET (UTC+1)	B. Katona 5'; Zsótér 41'; Botka (red card) 81'	Report	Šaponjić (yellow card) 48', (goal) 65', 83' (pen.); B. Szabó (red card) 73'; Simuț (yellow card) 87'	Stadium: Széktói Stadion; Attendance: 2,168; Referee: Gergő Bogár; Assistant referees: Gergő Vígh-Tarsonyi, Ákos Berényi; Fourth official: Tamás Bognár

16 March 2025 24	Ferencváros	4–0	Kecskemét	Budapest
15:00 CET (UTC+1)	Pešić 10', 72' (pen.); Maïga 31'; Raul Gustavo 78'; Ben Romdhane (yellow card) 85'	Report	Belényesi (yellow card) 36'; L. Katona (yellow card) 36'; Vágó (yellow card) 57'; Vattay (yellow card) 77'	Stadium: Groupama Arena; Attendance: 10,107; Referee: Csaba Pintér; Assistant referees: Balázs Szert, Péter Ország; Fourth official: Imre Kovács

28 March 2025 25	Kecskemét	1–3	Debrecen	Kecskemét
20:00 CET (UTC+1)	Pászka 27', (yellow card) 35'; Botka (yellow card) 30'; L. Katona (yellow card) 43'; A. Szabó (yellow card) 77'; Camaj (yellow card) 83'	Report	Szécsi 7'; Vajda 21'; Malinov (yellow card) 43', (goal) 45+1'; Hofmann (yellow card) 69'	Stadium: Széktói Stadion; Attendance: 2,074; Referee: József Erdős; Assistant referees: Balázs Buzás, Bence Péter Belicza; Fourth official: Gergő Bogár

5 April 2025 26	Kecskemét	1–1	Győr	Kecskemét
14:30 CEST (UTC+2)	Zeke (yellow card) 28'; Lukács 88'	Report	Bánáti (yellow card) 5'; Benbouali (yellow card) 72'; Bitri 90+6'	Stadium: Széktói Stadion; Attendance: 2,241; Referee: Péter Zierkelbach; Assistant referees: Gergely Becséri, Péter Ország; Fourth official: Marcell Derdák

11 April 2025 27	Diósgyőr	2–1	Kecskemét	Miskolc
18:00 CEST (UTC+2)	Lund (yellow card) 36'; D. Gera (yellow card) 44'; Tiéhi (yellow card) 60'; Acolatse 87'; Edomwonyi 89'	Report	Camaj 30' (pen.); Botka (yellow card) 71'; Bocskay (yellow card) 83'	Stadium: Diósgyőri Stadion; Attendance: 4,617; Referee: Marcell Derdák; Assistant referees: Vencel Tóth II, Balázs Huszár; Fourth official: Eszter Urbán

21 April 2025 28	Kecskemét	0–0	Újpest	Kecskemét
18:30 CEST (UTC+2)	Camaj (yellow card) 64'; Botka (yellow card) 66'; Vágó (yellow card) 89'	Report		Stadium: Széktói Stadion; Attendance: 2,864; Referee: Mihály Káprály; Assistant referees: Gergely Becséri, Péter Ország; Fourth official: Marcell Derdák

27 April 2025 29	Zalaegerszeg	0–0	Kecskemét	Zalaegerszeg
18:00 CEST (UTC+2)	Sanković (yellow card) 48'; Szendrei (yellow card) 55'	Report	L. Katona (yellow card) 77'; Bocskay (yellow card) 81'; Belényesi (yellow card) 88'	Stadium: ZTE Arena; Attendance: 2,985; Referee: Csaba Pintér; Assistant referees: Balázs Szert, József Aradi; Fourth official: Péter Zierkelbach

4 May 2025 30	Kecskemét	2–2	Nyíregyháza	Kecskemét
16:00 CEST (UTC+2)	Ryashko (yellow card) 25'; Zsótér (yellow card) 27'; L. Katona (yellow card) 58', (goal) 90+4'; Montiel 75'; Belényesi (yellow card) 90+5'	Report	Beke 1'; Toma (yellow card) 36'; B. Nagy (yellow card) 71'; D. Nagy 74'	Stadium: Széktói Stadion; Attendance: 2,079; Referee: Imre Kovács; Assistant referees: Georgiou Theodoros, Péter Ország; Fourth official: Gergő Bogár

10 May 2025 31	MTK	2–1	Kecskemét	Budapest
17:45 CEST (UTC+2)	Jurina 36'; Polievka 72'	Report	Pálinkás 52'; Belényesi (yellow card) 65'; Botka (yellow card) 88'	Stadium: Hidegkuti Nándor Stadion; Attendance: 3,822; Referee: Marcell Derdák; Assistant referees: Balázs Huszár, Zoltán Horváth; Fourth official: Attila Molnár

16 May 2025 32	Kecskemét	0–1	Puskás Akadémia	Kecskemét
18:15 CEST (UTC+2)	Bocskay (yellow card) 41'	Report	Colley (yellow card) 50'; Nissilä (yellow card) 66'; Plšek 84'	Stadium: Széktói Stadion; Attendance: 1,852; Referee: Tamás Bognár; Assistant referees: Ákos Berényi, Péter Ország; Fourth official: Marcell Derdák

23 May 2025 33	Paks	1–1	Kecskemét	Paks
20:15 CEST (UTC+2)	Böde 43' (pen.)	Report	Májer 90+2'	Stadium: Fehérvári úti Stadion; Attendance: 3,480; Referee: István Vad; Assistant referees: Vencel Tóth II, István Albert; Fourth official: Ádám Pillók

=== Magyar Kupa ===
15 September 2024 Round of 64	Kozármisleny	0–4	Kecskemét	Kozármisleny
17:00 CEST (UTC+2)	Turi (yellow card) 31'; Cipf (yellow card) 45'; Kosovshchuk (yellow card) 81'	Report	Lukács 22' (pen.), 29'; Vágó 32'; Belényesi (yellow card) 53'; B. Katona 56'	Stadium: Kozármislenyi Stadion; Attendance: 500; Referee: Marcell Derdák; Assistant referees: Péter Ország, Tamás Kulman

30 October 2024 Round of 32	Karcag	1–0	Kecskemét	Karcag
12:30 CET (UTC+1)	Györgye (yellow card) 35'; Székely 51'; Győri (yellow card) 90+3'	Report	Ba. Kovács (yellow card) 79'	Stadium: Ligeti úti Sport- és Szabadidőközpont; Attendance: 1,000; Referee: Tamás Takács; Assistant referees: Dániel Sinkovicz, Dániel Szabó

== Statistics ==
=== Overall ===
Appearances (Apps) numbers are for appearances in competitive games only, including sub appearances.
Source: Competitions

No.	Player	Pos.	Nemzeti Bajnokság I				Magyar Kupa				Total			
No.	Player	Pos.	Apps	Goal	Booked	Sent off (straight red)	Apps	Goal	Booked	Sent off (straight red)	Apps	Goal	Booked	Sent off (straight red)
1	(Hungary) Kristóf Pálfi	GK												
3	(Hungary) Dániel Lukács	FW	28	5	2		2	2			30	7	2	
4	(Hungary) Bertalan Bocskay	MF	17		6		2				19		6	
6	(Hungary) Levente Katona	DF	30	2	9		2				32	2	9	
7	(Hungary) Gergő Pálinkás	FW	31	4	4		2				33	4	4	
9	(Hungary) Milán Májer	FW	21	2			1				22	2		
10	(Hungary) Krisztián Nagy	MF	23		3		2				25		3	
11	(Hungary) Barnabás Kovács	MF	22	1	5		1		1		23	1	6	
12	(Hungary) Lóránd Pászka	DF	6	1	1						6	1	1	
14	(Hungary) Kolos Kovács	MF	1				1				2			
15	(Hungary) Alex Szabó	DF	24		8		1				25		8	
16	(Hungary) Levente Vágó	MF	23	1	9		2	1			25	2	9	
17	(Hungary) Marcell Berki	FW	19		1	1	1				20		1	1
18	(Hungary) Csaba Belényesi	DF	32		9		2		1		34		10	
19	(Hungary) Endre Botka	DF	12		4	1					12		4	1
19	(Hungary) Zoltán Derekas	MF	2		1						2		1	
20	(Hungary) Bence Varga	GK	11		2	1	1				12		2	1
21	(Brazil) Matheus Leoni	DF												
21	(Ukraine) Mykhaylo Ryashko	DF	8		4		2				10		4	
22	(Montenegro) Driton Camaj	FW	16	5	2						16	5	2	
22	(Hungary) Pál Helmich	MF	4								4			
23	(Ukraine) Mykhaylo Meskhi	MF	17		3		1				18		3	
24	(Hungary) Milán Papp	DF												
26	(Hungary) Kornél Szűcs	DF	1		1						1		1	
27	(Hungary) Donát Zsótér	MF	26	2	2						26	2	2	
29	(Spain) Tòfol Montiel	FW	10	1	1		2				12	1	1	
32	(Argentina) Michael López	FW	11								11			
44	(Hungary) Tamás Nikitscher	MF	17	2	3		2				19	2	3	
46	(Hungary) Roland Kersák	GK	22		2		1				23		2	
55	(Hungary) Bálint Katona	MF	24	3			2	1			26	4		
72	(Hungary) Máté Kotula	DF	1				2				3			
74	(Hungary) Imre Polyák	MF												
77	(Hungary) Márió Zeke	DF	33	2	3						33	2	3	
90	(Hungary) Márton Vattay	MF	13		2						13		2	
99	(Hungary) András Győri	GK												
Own goals														
Totals				31	87	3		4	2			35	89	3

=== Clean sheets ===
			Clean sheets		
No.	Player	Games Played	Nemzeti Bajnokság I	Magyar Kupa	Total
46	(Hungary) Roland Kersák	23	7		7
20	(Hungary) Bence Varga	12		1	1
1	(Hungary) Kristóf Pálfi				
99	(Hungary) András Győri				
Totals			7	1	8
