= 2023–24 Kecskeméti TE season =

Kecskemét
2023–24 season
- Manager: István Szabó (domestic competitions); István Lóczi (European competitions)
- Stadium: Széktói Stadion
- Nemzeti Bajnokság I: 6th
- Magyar Kupa: Quarter-finalist
- UEFA Europa Conference League: Second qualifying round
- Top goalscorer: League: K. Horváth (11); All: K. Horváth (12)
- Highest home attendance: 4,957 Ferencváros at NB I, R12
- Lowest home attendance: 1,824 MTK Budapest at NB I, R15
- Biggest win: 3 goals · 4–1 Puskás Akadémia · 3–0 Mezőkövesd · 3–0 Újpest
- Biggest defeat: 3 goals · 0–3 Puskás Akadémia
Home colours	Away colours
- All statistics correct as of 19 May 2024.

The 2023–24 season was Kecskeméti Torna Egylet's 9th competitive season, 2nd consecutive season in the Nemzeti Bajnokság I and 112th year in existence as a football club. In addition to the domestic league, Kecskemét participated in this season's editions of the Magyar Kupa and UEFA Europa Conference League.

István Szabó did not have a UEFA Pro Licence to manage the team in the Conference League, as per István Lóczi has been appointed in these matches. Kecskemét achieved the first European success in their history when they beat Riga at home, although in the second leg they were knocked out of the competition in the last minute of extra time.

== First team squad ==
As of 25 October 2023.

Note: Flags indicate national team as defined under FIFA eligibility rules; some limited exceptions apply. Players may hold more than one non-FIFA nationality.

No.	Pos.	Nation	Player
1	GK	HUN	Tamás Fadgyas
6	DF	HUN	Levente Katona
7	FW	HUN	Gergő Pálinkás
8	MF	HUN	Bence Banó-Szabó
9	FW	HUN	Milán Májer
10	MF	HUN	Krisztián Nagy
11	MF	HUN	Krisztofer Horváth (on loan from Torino)
12	DF	HUN	Gábor Szalai
14	MF	HUN	Kolos Kovács
15	DF	HUN	Alex Szabó
16	MF	HUN	Levente Vágó
18	DF	HUN	Csaba Belényesi
20	GK	HUN	Bence Varga
21	DF	BRA	Matheus Leoni

No.	Pos.	Nation	Player
22	FW	HUN	Barna Tóth
23	MF	UKR	Mykhaylo Meskhi
25	DF	HUN	Olivér Nagy (on loan from Ferencváros)
26	DF	HUN	Kornél Szűcs
27	MF	HUN	Donát Zsótér
29	MF	HUN	Soma Szuhodovszki
31	MF	HUN	Bence Kiss
44	MF	HUN	Tamás Nikitscher
46	GK	HUN	Roland Kersák
57	DF	HUN	Patrick Iyinbor (on loan from Ferencváros)
70	MF	HUN	Dávid Artner
74	DF	HUN	Imre Polyák
77	DF	HUN	Márió Zeke
99	FW	HUN	Ákos Szendrei (on loan from Dunajská Streda)

== Transfers ==
=== Summer ===
In: Note: Flags indicate national team as defined under FIFA eligibility rules; some limited exceptions apply. Players may hold more than one non-FIFA nationality.

No.	Pos.	Nation	Player
21	DF	BRA	Matheus Leoni (from Kisvárda)

Out: Note: Flags indicate national team as defined under FIFA eligibility rules; some limited exceptions apply. Players may hold more than one non-FIFA nationality.

No.	Pos.	Nation	Player
32	DF	HUN	Valentin Hadaró (to Pécs)

== Competitions ==
=== Overview ===
Competition	First match	Last match	Starting round	Final position	Record							
Competition	First match	Last match	Starting round	Final position	Pld	W	D	L	GF	GA	GD	Win %
Nemzeti Bajnokság I	7 August 2023	25 May 2024	Matchday 1	TBA	19	8	3	8	30	30	+0	42.11
Magyar Kupa	15 September 2023	TBA	Round of 64	TBA	2	2	0	0	3	1	+2	100.00
UEFA Europa Conference League	27 July 2023	3 August 2023	Second qualifying round	Second qualifying round	2	1	0	1	3	4	−1	50.00
Total					23	11	3	9	36	35	+1	47.83

Last updated: 9 February 2024
Source: Competitions

=== Nemzeti Bajnokság I ===
==== League table ====
Pos	Team	Pld	W	D	L	GF	GA	GD	Pts	Qualification or relegation
4	Fehérvár	33	16	6	11	55	40	+15	54	Qualification for the Conference League second qualifying round
5	Debrecen	33	14	6	13	49	48	+1	48	
6	Kecskemét	33	13	6	14	45	45	0	45	
7	Diósgyőr	33	12	9	12	50	56	−6	45	
8	MTK	33	12	8	13	43	62	−19	44	

Source: Hungarian Football Federation (in Hungarian), Soccerway
Rules for classification: 1) Points; 2) Matches won; 3) Goal difference; 4) Goals scored; 5) Head-to-head points; 6) Head-to-head goal difference; 7) Fair play ranking; 8) Drawing of lots.

==== Results summary ====
Overall								Home						Away					
Pld	W	D	L	GF	GA	GD	Pts	W	D	L	GF	GA	GD	W	D	L	GF	GA	GD
19	8	3	8	30	30	0	27	6	2	2	18	11	+7	2	1	6	12	19	−7

Last updated: 9 February 2024.
Source: Soccerway

==== Results by round ====
Round	1	2	3	4	5	6	7	8	9	10	11	12	13	14	15	16	17	18	19	20	21	22	23	24	25	26	27	28	29	30	31	32	33
Ground	A	H	H	A	H	A	H	A	H	A	H	H	A	A	H	A	H	A	H	A	H	A	A	H	H	A	H	A	H	A	H	A	H
Result	L	W	W	L	W	L	L	L	D	L	W	W	W	D	L	L	D	W	W														
Position	10	6	3	6	3	8	8	8	9	9	9	8	8	6	7	9	8	8	7														

Updated to match(es) played on 8 February 2024. Source: Matches
A = Away; H = Home; W = Win; D = Draw; L = Loss

==== Matches ====
7 August 2023 2	Kecskemét	3–1	Kisvárda	Kecskemét
20:00 CEST (UTC+2)	K. Nagy (yellow card) 25'; Szuhodovszki 35'; Pálinkás 39'; Tóth (yellow card) 48'; Belényesi (yellow card) 50'; Májer (yellow card) 82'; Szalai 90+3'	Report	Petković (yellow card) 35'; Jovičić (yellow card) 35'; Spasić 45'; Kruščić (not on pitch) (yellow card) 50'	Stadium: Széktói Stadion; Attendance: 2,523; Referee: Mihály Káprály

13 August 2023 3	Kecskemét	1–0	Fehérvár	Kecskemét
21:00 CEST (UTC+2)	Szalai (yellow card) 15', (goal) 35'; K. Nagy (yellow card) 67'; Varga (yellow card) 80'; Leoni (yellow card) 90'; K. Horváth (yellow card) 90+5'	Report	Zeke (yellow card) 34'; Csongvai (yellow card) 88'	Stadium: Széktói Stadion; Attendance: 3,487; Referee: József Erdős

19 August 2023 4	MTK	1–0	Kecskemét	Budapest
17:45 CEST (UTC+2)	Kata (yellow card) 15'; Zsóri (yellow card) 45+2'; A. Horváth (yellow card) 67'; Hey 84'	Report	O. Nagy (yellow card) 69'	Stadium: Hidegkuti Nándor Stadion; Attendance: 2,319; Referee: Ádám Pillók

26 August 2023 5	Kecskemét	4–1	Puskás Akadémia	Kecskemét
15:30 CEST (UTC+2)	K. Nagy 31' (pen.); Tóth (yellow card) 35', (goal) 67'; Szuhodovszki (yellow card) 45+1'; K. Horváth 45+9' (pen.), 57'; Szabó (yellow card) 84'; Májer (yellow card) 90+1'	Report	Plšek (yellow card) 29', (goal) 47' (pen.); Levi (yellow card) 62'	Stadium: Széktói Stadion; Attendance: 2,786; Referee: Tamás Bognár

3 September 2023 6	Debrecen	2–0	Kecskemét	Debrecen
19:30 CEST (UTC+2)	Lončar 62', (yellow card) 71'; Kusnyír 66'	Report	Leoni (yellow card) 10'; Szuhodovszki (yellow card) 83'	Stadium: Nagyerdei Stadion; Attendance: 4,521; Referee: Csaba Pintér

22 September 2023 7	Kecskemét	0–2	Mezőkövesd	Kecskemét
20:00 CEST (UTC+2)	Szuhodovszki (yellow card) 38'; Belényesi (yellow card) 48'; Vágó (yellow card) 62'	Report	Kállai (yellow card) 31'; Dražić 64', 78'	Stadium: Széktói Stadion; Attendance: 3,647; Referee: Dr Bence Csonka

27 September 2023 1	Ferencváros	1–0	Kecskemét	Budapest
20:00 CEST (UTC+2)	Sigér 72'; Abena (yellow card) 83'	Report	Kiss (yellow card) 28'; Zeke (yellow card) 49'; Tóth (yellow card) 71'; Vágó (yellow card) 89'	Stadium: Groupama Arena; Attendance: 7,299; Referee: Ferenc Karakó
Note: The match was originally scheduled for 29 July 2023, but was postponed due to both teams participation in European competitions.

1 October 2023 8	Diósgyőr	3–1	Kecskemét	Miskolc
17:30 CEST (UTC+2)	Vancaš 10' (pen.); Gera 18'; Jurina 70'	Report	Zeke (yellow card) 8'; Belényesi (yellow card) 37'; G. Szalai (yellow card) 51'; K. Horváth 86' (pen.)	Stadium: DVTK Stadion; Attendance: 7,292; Referee: Mihály Káprály

7 October 2023 9	Kecskemét	1–1	Paks	Kecskemét
20:30 CEST (UTC+2)	Tóth (yellow card) 24'; Szuhodovszki (yellow card) 56'; Pálinkás 75'; Májer (yellow card) 90+2'	Report	Szappanos (yellow card) 24'; Osváth (yellow card) 41', (goal) 69'; Papp (yellow card) 67'; Hahn (yellow card) 90+5'	Stadium: Széktói Stadion; Attendance: 3,785; Referee: Balázs Berke

21 October 2023 10	Újpest	5–3	Kecskemét	Budapest
17:00 CEST (UTC+2)	Csoboth 5', 52'; Tamás 32'; Tajti 48'; Onovo 51', (yellow card) 52'; G. Varga (yellow card) 85'	Report	G. Szalai 57'; Szuhodovszki 60'; Vágó 85'	Stadium: Szusza Ferenc Stadion; Attendance: 5,732; Referee: Tamás Bognár

28 October 2023 11	Kecskemét	3–1	Zalaegerszeg	Kecskemét
12:30 CEST (UTC+2)	Szuhodovszki (yellow card) 17'; Tóth (yellow card) 27', (goal) 35'; Szabó 45+4'; Leoni (yellow card) 57'; Zeke 73'	Report	Csóka (yellow card) 9'; Safronov (yellow card) 45+2'; Mance 82' (pen.); Huszti (yellow card) 87'	Stadium: Széktói Stadion; Attendance: 2,487; Referee: Márton Rúsz

5 November 2023 12	Kecskemét	2–1	Ferencváros	Kecskemét
14:45 CET (UTC+1)	Pálinkás 18'; Vágó (yellow card) 27'; K. Horváth 33' (pen.); Iyinbor (yellow card) 52'; Szalai (yellow card) 56'; Zeke (yellow card) 70'; Májer (yellow card) 90+8'	Report	Esiti (yellow card) 23'; Makreckis (yellow card) 56'; Lisztes 69' (pen.), (yellow card) 71'	Stadium: Széktói Stadion; Attendance: 4,957; Referee: Csaba Pintér

12 November 2023 13	Kisvárda	1–2	Kecskemét	Kisvárda
13:30 CET (UTC+1)	Ilievski 8'; Nikolov (yellow card) 45+4'	Report	Leoni (yellow card) 23'; K. Horváth 45+3' (pen.), (yellow card) 45+4'; Vágó 67', (yellow card) 77'; Májer (yellow card) 88'; Szűcs (yellow card) 90+1'	Stadium: Várkerti Stadion; Attendance: 2,141; Referee: Balázs Berke

26 November 2023 14	Fehérvár	3–3	Kecskemét	Székesfehérvár
19:30 CET (UTC+1)	M. Katona 11', 61', 90+1'	Report	Szalai 9', (yellow card) 34'; Zsótér (yellow card) 65'; Szűcs (yellow card) 72'; O. Nagy 77'; Szendrei 80'; Szabó (yellow card) 90+4'	Stadium: Sóstói Stadion; Attendance: 1,752; Referee: Dr Bence Csonka

2 December 2023 15	Kecskemét	1–2	MTK	Kecskemét
13:00 CET (UTC+1)	Zeke (yellow card) 17'; K. Horváth (yellow card) 32', (goal) 45+1' (pen.)	Report	Antonov 13' (pen.), 61' (pen.); Thiam (yellow card) 22'; Végh (yellow card) 29'; Bognár (yellow card) 32'; Varju (yellow card) 64'; Hey (yellow card) 78'; Németh (yellow card) 90'	Stadium: Széktói Stadion; Attendance: 1,824; Referee: Márton Rúsz

8 December 2023 16	Puskás Akadémia	3–0	Kecskemét	Felcsút
20:00 CET (UTC+1)	Favorov (yellow card) 18'; Colley 22'; Z. Nagy 69', 89'; Soisalo (yellow card) 73'	Report	K. Horváth (yellow card) 27'; Vágó (yellow card) 54'; Be. Varga (yellow card) 89'	Stadium: Pancho Aréna; Attendance: 1,000; Referee: Ferenc Karakó

17 December 2023 17	Kecskemét	1–1	Debrecen	Kecskemét
13:30 CET (UTC+1)	Leoni (yellow card) 74'; Banó-Szabó 80'	Report	Szécsi 45+1', (yellow card) 74'; Mojžiš (yellow card) 74'	Stadium: Széktói Stadion; Attendance: 2,231; Referee: Péter Zierkelbach

4 February 2024 18	Mezőkövesd	0–3	Kecskemét	Mezőkövesd
15:00 CET (UTC+1)	Cseke (yellow card) 35'	Report	Szabó (yellow card) 9', (goal) 31'; Lukács 11', 13'; Banó-Szabó (yellow card) 55'; Vágó (yellow card) 83'	Stadium: Városi Stadion; Attendance: Referee: Tamás Bognár

8 February 2024 19	Kecskemét	2–1	Diósgyőr	Kecskemét
20:00 CET (UTC+1)	K. Horváth 17', 71'; Lukács (yellow card) 58'; L. Katona (yellow card) 82'	Report	Popadiuc (yellow card) 10'; Vancaš 59'	Stadium: Széktói Stadion; Attendance: 2,127; Referee: Dr Bence Csonka

11 February 2024 20	Paks	1-0	Kecskemét	Paks
12:30 CET (UTC+1)	Windecker (yellow card) 40'; Szélpál (yellow card) 44'; Windecker 64'	Report	Szűcs (yellow card) 20'; Katona (yellow card) 34'; Vago (yellow card) 40'; Horváth (yellow card) 48'; Varga (yellow card) 90+5'	Stadium: Fehérvári úti Stadion; Referee: Márton Rúsz

24 February 2024 21	Kecskemét	v	Újpest	Kecskemét
CET (UTC+1)				Stadium: Széktói Stadion

2 March 2024 22	Zalaegerszeg	v	Kecskemét	Zalaegerszeg
CET (UTC+1)				Stadium: ZTE Arena

9 March 2024 23	Ferencváros	v	Kecskemét	Budapest
CET (UTC+1)				Stadium: Groupama Arena

16 March 2024 24	Kecskemét	v	Kisvárda	Kecskemét
CET (UTC+1)				Stadium: Széktói Stadion

30 March 2024 25	Kecskemét	v	Fehérvár	Kecskemét
CET (UTC+1)				Stadium: Széktói Stadion

6 April 2024 26	MTK	v	Kecskemét	Budapest
CEST (UTC+2)				Stadium: Hidegkuti Nándor Stadion

13 April 2024 27	Kecskemét	v	Puskás Akadémia	Kecskemét
CEST (UTC+2)				Stadium: Széktói Stadion

20 April 2024 28	Debrecen	v	Kecskemét	Debrecen
CEST (UTC+2)				Stadium: Nagyerdei Stadion

27 April 2024 29	Kecskemét	v	Mezőkövesd	Kecskemét
CEST (UTC+2)				Stadium: Széktói Stadion

4 May 2024 30	Diósgyőr	v	Kecskemét	Miskolc
CEST (UTC+2)				Stadium: DVTK Stadion

11 May 2024 31	Kecskemét	v	Paks	Kecskemét
CEST (UTC+2)				Stadium: Széktói Stadion

18 May 2024 32	Újpest	v	Kecskemét	Budapest
CEST (UTC+2)				Stadium: Szusza Ferenc Stadion

25 May 2024 33	Kecskemét	v	Zalaegerszeg	Kecskemét
CEST (UTC+2)				Stadium: Széktói Stadion

=== Magyar Kupa ===
The draw for the round of 64 was held on 28 August 2023.

15 September 2023 Round of 64	Soroksár	1–2	Kecskemét	Soroksár
20:00 CEST (UTC+2)	Lovrencsics 31'	Report	Pálinkás 5'; K. Horváth 83', (yellow card) 84'	Stadium: Szamosi Mihály Sportelep; Attendance: 700; Referee: Márton Rúsz

1 November 2023 Round of 32	Szeged	0–1	Kecskemét	Szeged
19:00 CET (UTC+1)	Könczey (yellow card) 59'	Report	Tóth (yellow card) 24'; Iyinbor 45'; Vágó (yellow card) 90'; Pálinkás (yellow card) 90'	Stadium: Szent Gellért Fórum; Attendance: 3,183; Referee: Bence Hanyecz

28 February 2024 Round of 16	Veszprém	0–2	Kecskemét	Ajka
17:00 CET (UTC+1)	Bartusz (yellow card) 40'; Major (yellow card) 56'; Krebsz (yellow card) 64'; Baldauf (yellow card) 73'	Report	Zsótér (yellow card) 57' (goal) 59'; L. Katona (yellow card) 68' (goal) 90'; Vágó (yellow card) 74'	Stadium: Ajkai Városi Sportcentrum; Attendance: 1,500; Referee: Zoltán Kovács

4 April 2024 Quarter-finals	Nyíregyháza	2–1	Kecskemét	Balmazújváros
20:45 CET (UTC+1)	Á. Sigér (yellow card) 34'; Gengeliczki 44'; Novák 69'; Baki (yellow card) 83'	Report	Á. Sigér 42' (o.g.); K. Horváth (yellow card) 79'; Pálinkás (yellow card) 89'	Stadium: Városi Sportpálya; Attendance: 800; Referee: Csaba Pintér

=== UEFA Europa Conference League ===
Second qualifying round

27 July 2023 First leg	Kecskemét (Hungary)	2–1	(Latvia) Riga	Kecskemét, Hungary
19:00 CEST (UTC+2)	Szuhodovszki 52' (pen.); G. Szalai (yellow card) 57'; Pálinkás 85'	Report	Taiwo (yellow card) 51'; Černomordijs (yellow card) 57'; Kožans (not on pitch) (yellow card) 59'; Mankenda (yellow card) 81'; Contreras 86'	Stadium: Széktói Stadion; Attendance: 3,991; Referee: Irakli Kvirikashvili (Georgia)

3 August 2023 Second leg	Riga (Latvia)	3–1 (a.e.t.) (4–3 agg.)	(Hungary) Kecskemét	Riga, Latvia
20:00 EEST (UTC+3)	Muzinga 62'; Bosančić (yellow card) 67'; Mankenda 90+5'; Ngom 120+2'	Report	Vágó 8'; Kiss (yellow card) 41'; Májer (yellow card) 53'; Iyinbor (yellow card) 66'; Varga (yellow card) 73'; G. Szalai (yellow card) 120+4'	Stadium: Skonto Stadium; Attendance: 5,533; Referee: Iwan Arwel Griffith (Wales)
Note: Riga won 4–3 on aggregate.
