= 2022–23 Kecskeméti TE season =

Kecskemét
2022–23 season
- Chairman: Pál Rózsa; János Versegi
- Manager: István Szabó
- Stadium: Széktói Stadion
- Nemzeti Bajnokság I: 2nd
- Magyar Kupa: Round of 32
- Top goalscorer: League: Bálint Katona (8); All: Bálint Katona; Barna Tóth (8 goals each)
- Highest home attendance: 4,950 (multiple league matches)
- Lowest home attendance: 1,627 vs Zalaegerszeg (27 August 2022); Nemzeti Bajnokság I
- Average home league attendance: 2,835
- Biggest win: 3–0 vs Tiszakécske (A) (18 September 2022); Magyar Kupa; 3–0 vs Puskás Akadémia (A) (8 April 2023); Nemzeti Bajnokság I 3–0 vs Zalaegerszeg (H) (15 April 2023); Nemzeti Bajnokság I
- Biggest defeat: 0–3 vs Újpest (A) (21 May 2023); Nemzeti Bajnokság I
Home colours	Away colours

The 2022–23 season was Kecskeméti Testedző Egyesület's 8th competitive season, 1st consecutive season in the Nemzeti Bajnokság I and 111st year in existence as a football club. In addition to the domestic league, Kecskemét participated in this season's editions of the Magyar Kupa.

== Transfers ==
=== Summer ===
In: Note: Flags indicate national team as defined under FIFA eligibility rules; some limited exceptions apply. Players may hold more than one non-FIFA nationality.

No.	Pos.	Nation	Player
1	GK	HUN	Ádám Varga (loan from Ferencváros)
2	DF	HUN	Milán Sági (from Pécs)
6	DF	SRB	Danilo Pejović (from Szeged)
7	MF	HUN	Máté Katona (loan from Ferencváros)
8	MF	HUN	Bence Banó-Szabó (from Budapest Honvéd)
9	FW	MNE	Uroš Đuranović (from (Serbia) Kolubara)
11	FW	HUN	Levente Szabó (loan from Fehérvár)
18	DF	HUN	Csaba Belényesi (from Diósgyőr)
20	GK	HUN	Bence Varga (loan from MTK Budapest)
23	MF	UKR	Mykhaylo Meskhi (from (Ukraine) Minaj)
55	MF	HUN	Bálint Katona (loan from Ferencváros II)
71	FW	HUN	Márton Gréczi (from Szeged)
77	DF	HUN	Márió Zeke (loan from Fehérvár)

Out: Note: Flags indicate national team as defined under FIFA eligibility rules; some limited exceptions apply. Players may hold more than one non-FIFA nationality.

No.	Pos.	Nation	Player
—	MF	HUN	László Bartha (to Kozármisleny)
—	FW	HUN	Patrik Paudits (to Dorog)
—	DF	HUN	Szabolcs Gál (to Kozármisleny)
—	DF	HUN	Ádám Lipcsei (to ESMTK)
—	MF	HUN	László Szabó (to Dabas)
—	FW	HUN	Dániel Lukács (to Diósgyőr)
—	DF	HUN	Valentin Hadaró (loan to Pécs)
—	DF	HUN	Balázs Kis
—	MF	HUN	Dániel Szökrönyös (loan return to Zalaegerszeg)

=== Winter ===
In: Note: Flags indicate national team as defined under FIFA eligibility rules; some limited exceptions apply. Players may hold more than one non-FIFA nationality.

No.	Pos.	Nation	Player
—	DF	HUN	Imre Polyák (from Budapest Honvéd II)
—	MF	HUN	Tamás Nikitscher (from Pécs)
—	FW	HUN	Krisztofer Horváth (loan from (Italy) Torino)
—	DF	HUN	Valentin Hadaró (loan return from Pécs)
—	MF	HUN	Milán Májer (from Zalaegerszeg)

Out: Note: Flags indicate national team as defined under FIFA eligibility rules; some limited exceptions apply. Players may hold more than one non-FIFA nationality.

No.	Pos.	Nation	Player
2	DF	HUN	Milán Sági (to Kozármisleny)
6	DF	SRB	Danilo Pejović (loan to Pécs)
9	FW	MNE	Uroš Đuranović (to (Serbia) Kolubara)
11	FW	HUN	Levente Szabó (loan return to Fehérvár)

== Competitions ==
=== Overview ===
Competition	First match	Last match	Starting round	Final position	Record							
Competition	First match	Last match	Starting round	Final position	Pld	W	D	L	GF	GA	GD	Win %
Nemzeti Bajnokság I	30 July 2022	26 May 2023	Matchday 1	2nd	33	15	12	6	48	32	+16	45.45
Magyar Kupa	18 September 2022	18 October 2022	Round of 64	Round of 32	2	1	0	1	3	1	+2	50.00
Total					35	16	12	7	51	33	+18	45.71

Source: Competitions

=== Nemzeti Bajnokság I ===
==== League table ====
Pos	Team	Pld	W	D	L	GF	GA	GD	Pts	Qualification or relegation
1	Ferencváros (C)	33	19	6	8	62	33	+29	63	Qualification for the Champions League first qualifying round
2	Kecskemét	33	15	12	6	48	32	+16	57	Qualification for the Europa Conference League second qualifying round
3	Debrecen	33	15	9	9	52	39	+13	54	Qualification for the Europa Conference League second qualifying round
4	Puskás Akadémia	33	14	11	8	48	42	+6	53	
5	Paks	33	14	7	12	57	57	0	49	

Source: Hungarian Football Federation (in Hungarian), Soccerway
Rules for classification: 1) Points; 2) Matches won; 3) Goal difference; 4) Goals scored; 5) Head-to-head points; 6) Head-to-head goal difference; 7) Fair play ranking; 8) Drawing of lots.
(C) Champions

==== Results summary ====
Overall								Home						Away					
Pld	W	D	L	GF	GA	GD	Pts	W	D	L	GF	GA	GD	W	D	L	GF	GA	GD
33	15	12	6	48	32	+16	57	9	6	2	31	17	+14	6	6	4	17	15	+2

Source: Soccerway

==== Results by round ====
Round	1	2	3	4	5	6	7	8	9	10	11	12	13	14	15	16	17	18	19	20	21	22	23	24	25	26	27	28	29	30	31	32	33
Ground	H	A	H	A	H	A	H	A	H	A	H	A	H	A	H	A	H	A	H	A	H	A	H	A	H	A	H	A	H	A	H	A	H
Result	D	D	W	D	W	L	W	D	W	W	D	W	D	L	D	D	W	D	D	D	D	W	W	W	L	W	W	W	L	L	W	L	W
Position	8	9	4	3	3	3	3	3	2	2	2	2	2	3	3	2	2	2	2	2	2	2	2	2	2	2	2	2	2	2	2	2	2

Source: Matches
A = Away; H = Home; W = Win; D = Draw; L = Loss

==== Matches ====
30 July 2022 1	Kecskemét	0–0	Vasas	Kecskemét
17:45 CEST (UTC+2)	Sági (yellow card) 16' (yellow-red card) 40'	Report		Stadium: Széktói Stadion; Attendance: 2,527; Referee: József Erdős

6 August 2022 2	Debrecen	1–1	Kecskemét	Debrecen
20:00 CEST (UTC+2)	Bárány 67'	Report	Szabó 79' (pen.)	Stadium: Nagyerdei Stadion; Attendance: 4,724; Referee: Mihály Káprály

13 August 2022 3	Kecskemét	1–0	Mezőkövesd	Kecskemét
18:00 CEST (UTC+2)	B. Katona 13'	Report		Stadium: Széktói Stadion; Attendance: 1,719; Referee: Péter Zierkelbach

19 August 2022 4	Puskás Akadémia	1–1	Kecskemét	Felcsút
20:00 CEST (UTC+2)	A. Szabó 86' (o.g.)	Report	Szuhodovszki 3'; Zeke (red card) 79'	Stadium: Pancho Aréna; Attendance: 980; Referee: Sándor Andó-Szabó

27 August 2022 5	Kecskemét	3–1	Zalaegerszeg	Kecskemét
17:30 CEST (UTC+2)	Banó-Szabó 42' (pen.); L. Szabó 55' (pen.), 58'; B. Tóth (red card) 88'	Report	Bedi 12'; Huszti (red card) 41'	Stadium: Széktói Stadion; Attendance: 1,627; Referee: Ferenc Karakó

31 August 2022 6	Fehérvár	2–1	Kecskemét	Székesfehérvár
19:30 CEST (UTC+2)	Négo 31'; Stopira 90+1'	Report	B. Katona 40'	Stadium: MOL Aréna Sóstó; Attendance: 2,046; Referee: Ádám Farkas

3 September 2022 7	Kecskemét	3–1	Paks	Kecskemét
14:00 CEST (UTC+2)	B. Katona 47'; Banó-Szabó 71'; L. Szabó 88'	Report	Sajbán 81'	Stadium: Széktói Stadion; Attendance: 2,124; Referee: Bence Csonka

10 September 2022 8	Budapest Honvéd	0–0	Kecskemét	Budapest
17:45 CEST (UTC+2)		Report		Stadium: Bozsik Aréna; Attendance: 3,446; Referee: Mihály Káprály

2 October 2022 9	Kecskemét	2–0	Ferencváros	Kecskemét
16:30 CEST (UTC+2)	Nagy 28', 34' (pen.)	Report		Stadium: Széktói Stadion; Attendance: 2,527; Referee: Ferenc Karakó

7 October 2022 10	Újpest	1–2	Kecskemét	Budapest
20:05 CEST (UTC+2)	Diaby 90+14'	Report	B. Tóth 56'; B. Katona 80'	Stadium: Szusza Ferenc Stadion; Attendance: 2,852; Referee: Sándor Andó-Szabó

14 October 2022 11	Kecskemét	3–3	Kisvárda	Kecskemét
20:00 CEST (UTC+2)	Nagy 37' (pen.); B. Katona 57'; Đuranović 87'	Report	B. Varga 17' (o.g.); Camaj 53'; Ötvös 81'	Stadium: Széktói Stadion; Attendance: 2,108; Referee: Mihály Káprály

21 October 2022 12	Vasas	1–2	Kecskemét	Budapest
20:00 CEST (UTC+2)	Cipf 47'	Report	Vágó 35'; Zeke 40'	Stadium: Illovszky Rudolf Stadion; Attendance: 2,022; Referee: Ádám Farkas

29 October 2022 13	Kecskemét	2–2	Debrecen	Kecskemét
17:00 CEST (UTC+2)	Nagy 12'; Banó-Szabó 47'	Report	Szécsi 55'; Varga 87'	Stadium: Széktói Stadion; Attendance: 2,527; Referee: Márió Görög

5 November 2022 14	Mezőkövesd	2–1	Kecskemét	Mezőkövesd
14:45 CET (UTC+1)	Karnitsky 18'; Beširović 43'	Report	K. Kállai 29' (o.g.)	Stadium: Városi Stadion; Attendance: 2,211; Referee: Ferenc Karakó

8 November 2022 15	Kecskemét	1–1	Puskás Akadémia	Kecskemét
20:00 CET (UTC+1)	Banó-Szabó 52'	Report	Corbu 45'	Stadium: Széktói Stadion; Attendance: 1,720; Referee: Péter Zierkelbach

12 November 2022 16	Zalaegerszeg	0–0	Kecskemét	Zalaegerszeg
18:15 CET (UTC+1)		Report		Stadium: ZTE Arena; Attendance: 2,366; Referee: Tamás Bognár

29 January 2023 17	Kecskemét	2–1	Fehérvár	Kecskemét
17:30 CET (UTC+1)	Nagy 33'; Szuhodovszki 79'	Report	Larsen 35'	Stadium: Széktói Stadion; Attendance: 2,412; Referee: Csaba Pintér

4 February 2023 18	Paks	0–0	Kecskemét	Paks
14:30 CET (UTC+1)		Report		Stadium: Fehérvári úti Stadion; Attendance: 1,197; Referee: Ádám Farkas

11 February 2023 19	Kecskemét	2–2	Budapest Honvéd	Kecskemét
14:30 CET (UTC+1)	B. Katona 16'; Szuhodovszki 45'	Report	Domingues 19', 25'	Stadium: Széktói Stadion; Attendance: 2,527; Referee: Mihály Káprály

18 February 2023 20	Ferencváros	1–1	Kecskemét	Budapest
17:00 CET (UTC+1)	Traoré 36'	Report	Horváth 53'	Stadium: Groupama Arena; Attendance: 9,511; Referee: Ferenc Karakó

26 February 2023 21	Kecskemét	2–2	Újpest	Kecskemét
14:00 CET (UTC+1)	B. Tóth 83', 90+5'	Report	Simon 12'; Varga 52'	Stadium: Széktói Stadion; Attendance: 3,751; Referee: Marcell Derdák

4 March 2023 22	Kisvárda	0–1	Kecskemét	Kisvárda
14:15 CET (UTC+1)		Report	B. Katona 54'	Stadium: Várkerti Stadion; Attendance: 1,750; Referee: Tamás Bognár

12 March 2023 23	Kecskemét	2–0	Vasas	Kecskemét
14:05 CET (UTC+1)	B. Tóth 59'; Banó-Szabó 85'	Report		Stadium: Széktói Stadion; Attendance: 3,223; Referee: Ádám Farkas

18 March 2023 24	Debrecen	1–2	Kecskemét	Debrecen
15:45 CET (UTC+1)	Kyziridis (yellow card) 53'; Lončar (yellow card) 55', (goal) 61'	Report	Banó-Szabó (yellow card) 5'; Hadaró (yellow card) 59'; Szuhodovszki (yellow card) 62'; Deslandes 66' (o.g.); Horváth 80'	Stadium: Nagyerdei Stadion; Attendance: 5,114; Referee: Márton Rúsz

2 April 2023 25	Kecskemét	0–1	Mezőkövesd	Kecskemét
14:15 CEST (UTC+2)	Nikitscher (yellow card) 20'; Szalai (yellow card) 88'	Report	Beširović 51'; Beriashvili (yellow card) 75'; Karnitsky (yellow card) 80'; Piscitelli (yellow card) 85'	Stadium: Széktói Stadion; Attendance: 2,234; Referee: Balázs Berke

8 April 2023 26	Puskás Akadémia	0–3	Kecskemét	Felcsút
14:30 CEST (UTC+2)	Posztobányi (yellow card) 82'; van Nieff (yellow card) 83'	Report	Horváth 6', 55'; Szalai (yellow card) 36', (goal) 50'	Stadium: Pancho Aréna; Attendance: 1,810; Referee: Marcell Derdák

15 April 2023 27	Kecskemét	3–0	Zalaegerszeg	Kecskemét
14:30 CEST (UTC+2)	Horváth 20'; A. Szabó 24'; B. Tóth 71'	Report	Mocsi (yellow card) 51'; Szendrei (yellow card) 65'; Csóka (yellow card) 78'	Stadium: Széktói Stadion; Attendance: 2,812; Referee: Bence Csonka

22 April 2023 28	Fehérvár	1–2	Kecskemét	Székesfehérvár
15:00 CEST (UTC+2)	Stopira (yellow card) 39'; Heister (yellow card) 54'; Katona (yellow card) 77'; Kodro 90+3'	Report	Nagy 33', (yellow card) 50'; Banó-Szabó (yellow card) 39'; Horváth 40'; B. Tóth (yellow card) 58'	Stadium: MOL Aréna Sóstó; Attendance: 4,246; Referee: Gergő Bogár

28 April 2023 29	Kecskemét	2–3	Paks	Kecskemét
20:00 CEST (UTC+2)	G. Szalai 10'; Horváth (yellow card) 39'; A. Szabó 41', (yellow card) 84'; Vágó (red card) 57'	Report	Hahn (yellow card) 32'; Varga (yellow card) 46', (goal) 51', 58' (pen.), 90'; Sajbán (yellow card) 90+4'; Böde (yellow card) 90+4'	Stadium: Széktói Stadion; Attendance: 4,950; Referee: Sándor Andó-Szabó

5 May 2023 30	Budapest Honvéd	1–0	Kecskemét	Budapest
18:30 CEST (UTC+2)	Eördögh (yellow card) 18'; Kerezsi (yellow card) 36', (goal) 55'; Klemenz (yellow card) 66'; Doka (yellow card) 87'	Report	Májer (yellow card) 32'; Szalai (yellow card) 36'; Nikitscher (yellow card) 44'	Stadium: Bozsik Aréna; Attendance: 5,003; Referee: Tamás Bognár
Note: Klafurić (yellow card) 81'

13 May 2023 31	Kecskemét	2–0	Ferencváros	Kecskemét
19:30 CEST (UTC+2)	G. Szalai 34'; Belényesi (yellow card) 76'; B. Tóth 86'; Nikitscher (yellow card) 90+1'	Report	Esiti (yellow card) 51'; Kwabena (yellow card) 54'; Lisztes (yellow card) 60'; Abena (red card) 73'; Knoester (yellow card) 87'; Traoré (yellow card) 90+1'	Stadium: Széktói Stadion; Attendance: 4,950; Referee: Balázs Berke

21 May 2023 32	Újpest	3–0	Kecskemét	Budapest
17:30 CEST (UTC+2)	Mörschel 38'; Gouré 45', 55'	Report	B. Tóth (yellow card) 16'; Vágó (yellow card) 50'; Hadaró (yellow card) 76'; Májer (yellow card) 80'; Ryashko (red card) 83'	Stadium: Szusza Ferenc Stadion; Attendance: 4,792; Referee: Ádám Farkas

26 May 2023 33	Kecskemét	1–0	Kisvárda	Kecskemét
18:15 CEST (UTC+2)	Szalai (yellow card) 56'; B. Katona 68'; B. Tóth (yellow card) 90+2'	Report	Melnyk (yellow card) 9'; Lucas (yellow card) 19'	Stadium: Széktói Stadion; Attendance: 4,457; Referee: Csaba Pintér

=== Magyar Kupa ===
18 September 2022 Round of 64	Tiszakécske	0–3	Kecskemét	Tiszakécske
15:00 CEST (UTC+2)		Report	Pejović 48'; B. Tóth 67', 87'	Stadium: Városi Stadion; Attendance: 850; Referee: Tamás Berényi

18 October 2022 Round of 32	Győr	1–0	Kecskemét	Győr
17:00 CEST (UTC+2)	Be. Kiss 39'	Report		Stadium: ETO Park; Attendance: on closed Referee: Csaba Pintér

== Statistics ==
=== Appearances and goals ===
Last updated on 13 March 2023.

No.	Pos	Nat	Player	Total		Nemzeti Bajnokság I		Magyar Kupa	
No.	Pos	Nat	Player	Apps	Goals	Apps	Goals	Apps	Goals
1	GK	(Hungary) HUN	Ádám Varga	8	-9	6	-8	2	-1
4	DF	(Hungary) HUN	Attila Grünwald	8	0	6	0	2	0
7	MF	(Hungary) HUN	Máté Katona	10	0	9	0	1	0
8	MF	(Hungary) HUN	Bence Banó-Szabó	22	5	21	5	1	0
9	MF	(Hungary) HUN	Milán Májer	5	0	5	0	0	0
10	MF	(Hungary) HUN	Krisztián Nagy	25	5	23	5	2	0
11	FW	(Hungary) HUN	Krisztofer Horváth	7	1	7	1	0	0
12	DF	(Hungary) HUN	Gábor Szalai	21	0	20	0	1	0
15	DF	(Hungary) HUN	Alex Szabó	23	0	22	0	1	0
16	MF	(Hungary) HUN	Levente Vágó	24	1	22	1	2	0
18	DF	(Hungary) HUN	Csaba Belényesi	24	0	22	0	2	0
20	GK	(Hungary) HUN	Bence Varga	18	-14	18	-14	0	-0
21	DF	(Ukraine) UKR	Mykhaylo Ryashko	17	0	15	0	2	0
22	FW	(Hungary) HUN	Barna Tóth	24	6	22	4	2	2
23	MF	(Ukraine) UKR	Mykhaylo Meskhi	13	0	13	0	0	0
29	MF	(Hungary) HUN	Soma Szuhodovszki	25	3	23	3	2	0
32	DF	(Hungary) HUN	Valentin Hadaró	3	0	3	0	0	0
44	MF	(Hungary) HUN	Tamás Nikitscher	6	0	6	0	0	0
55	MF	(Hungary) HUN	Bálint Katona	24	7	23	7	1	0
71	FW	(Hungary) HUN	Márton Gréczi	4	0	3	0	1	0
74	DF	(Hungary) HUN	Imre Polyák	1	0	1	0	0	0
77	DF	(Hungary) HUN	Márió Zeke	20	1	20	1	0	0
Youth players:
3	DF	(Hungary) HUN	Dávid Tóth	0	0	0	0	0	0
14	MF	(Hungary) HUN	Ábel Győri	0	0	0	0	0	0
14	MF	(Hungary) HUN	Szilárd Szalai	0	0	0	0	0	0
17	FW	(Hungary) HUN	Zoltán Bodor	1	0	0	0	1	0
19	DF	(Hungary) HUN	Gábor Buna	1	0	0	0	1	0
31	RW	(Hungary) HUN	Benjámin Győri	0	0	0	0	0	0
46	GK	(Hungary) HUN	Roland Kersák	0	0	0	-0	0	-0
Out to loan:
6	DF	(Serbia) SRB	Danilo Pejović	6	1	5	0	1	1
Players no longer at the club:
2	DF	(Hungary) HUN	Milán Sági	9	0	7	0	2	0
9	FW	(Montenegro) MNE	Uroš Đuranović	13	1	11	1	2	0
11	FW	(Hungary) HUN	Levente Szabó	18	4	16	4	2	0

=== Top scorers ===
Includes all competitive matches. The list is sorted by shirt number when total goals are equal.

Position	Nation	Number	Name	Nemzeti Bajnokság I	Magyar Kupa	Total
1	(Hungary)	22	Barna Tóth	6	2	8
1	(Hungary)	55	Bálint Katona	8	0	8
3	(Hungary)	10	Krisztián Nagy	6	0	6
3	(Hungary)	11	Krisztofer Horváth	6	0	6
5	(Hungary)	8	Bence Banó-Szabó	5	0	5
6	(Hungary)	11	Levente Szabó	4	0	4
7	(Hungary)	12	Gábor Szalai	3	0	3
7	(Hungary)	29	Soma Szuhodovszki	3	0	3
9	(Hungary)	15	Alex Szabó	2	0	2
10	(Serbia)	6	Danilo Pejović	0	1	1
10	(Montenegro)	9	Uroš Đuranović	1	0	1
10	(Hungary)	16	Levente Vágó	1	0	1
10	(Hungary)	77	Márió Zeke	1	0	1
/	/	/	Own Goals	2	0	2
			TOTALS	48	3	51

=== Disciplinary record ===
Includes all competitive matches. Players with 1 card or more included only.

Position	Nation	Number	Name	Nemzeti Bajnokság I		Magyar Kupa		Total (Hu Total)	
Position	Nation	Number	Name	Yellow card	Red card	Yellow card	Red card	Yellow card	Red card
GK	(Hungary)	1	Ádám Varga	1	0	0	0	1 (1)	0 (0)
DF	(Hungary)	2	Milán Sági	0	1	0	0	0 (0)	1 (1)
DF	(Hungary)	4	Attila Grünwald	2	0	0	0	2 (2)	0 (0)
MF	(Hungary)	7	Máté Katona	1	0	0	0	1 (1)	0 (0)
MF	(Hungary)	8	Bence Banó-Szabó	9	0	0	0	9 (9)	0 (0)
FW	(Montenegro)	9	Uroš Đuranović	2	0	0	0	2 (2)	0 (0)
MF	(Hungary)	9	Milán Májer	2	0	0	0	2 (2)	0 (0)
MF	(Hungary)	10	Krisztián Nagy	4	0	0	0	4 (4)	0 (0)
FW	(Hungary)	11	Krisztofer Horváth	4	0	0	0	4 (4)	0 (0)
DF	(Hungary)	12	Gábor Szalai	7	0	0	0	7 (7)	0 (0)
DF	(Hungary)	15	Alex Szabó	4	0	0	0	4 (4)	0 (0)
MF	(Hungary)	16	Levente Vágó	10	1	0	0	10 (10)	1 (1)
DF	(Hungary)	18	Csaba Belényesi	4	0	0	0	4 (4)	0 (0)
DF	(Ukraine)	21	Mykhaylo Ryashko	2	1	0	0	2 (2)	1 (1)
FW	(Hungary)	22	Barna Tóth	8	1	0	0	8 (8)	1 (1)
MF	(Ukraine)	23	Mykhaylo Meskhi	4	0	0	0	4 (4)	0 (0)
MF	(Hungary)	29	Soma Szuhodovszki	3	0	1	0	4 (3)	0 (0)
DF	(Hungary)	32	Valentin Hadaró	3	0	0	0	3 (3)	0 (0)
MF	(Hungary)	44	Tamás Nikitscher	6	0	0	0	6 (6)	0 (0)
MF	(Hungary)	55	Bálint Katona	3	0	0	0	3 (3)	0 (0)
DF	(Hungary)	77	Márió Zeke	5	1	0	0	5 (5)	1 (1)
			TOTALS	84	5	1	0	85 (84)	5 (5)

=== Clean sheets ===
Position	Nation	Number	Name	Nemzeti Bajnokság I	Magyar Kupa	Total
1	(Hungary)	20	Bence Varga	13	0	13
2	(Hungary)	1	Ádám Varga	0	1	1
3	(Hungary)	46	Roland Kersák	0	0	0
			TOTALS	13	1	14
