= List of Hungarian football transfers winter 2024–25 =

This is a list of Hungarian football transfers for the 2024–25 winter transfer window. Only transfers featuring Nemzeti Bajnokság I are listed.

== Nemzeti Bajnokság I ==
Note: Flags indicate national team as has been defined under FIFA eligibility rules. Players may hold more than one non-FIFA nationality.

=== Ferencváros ===
In:

No.	Pos.	Nation	Player
5	MF	GUI	Naby Keïta (on loan from (Germany) Werder Bremen)
32	FW	SRB	Aleksandar Ćirković (from (Serbia) TSC)
66	MF	BRA	Júlio Romão (from (Azerbaijan) Qarabağ)
75	FW	FRA	Lenny Joseph (from (France) Grenoble)
89	GK	HUN	Dávid Gróf (from (Greece) Levadiakos)

Out:

No.	Pos.	Nation	Player
4	DF	NED	Mats Knoester (to (Scotland) Aberdeen)
10	MF	HUN	Kady Borges (to (Azerbaijan) Qarabağ)
13	MF	NGR	Anderson Esiti (to Zalaegerszeg)
18	FW	GHA	Owusu (on loan to Zalaegerszeg)
21	DF	HUN	Endre Botka (on loan to Kecskemét)
23	DF	HUN	Lóránd Pászka (on loan to Kecskemét)
30	FW	HUN	Zsombor Gruber (on loan to MTK)
—	FW	GHA	Owusu (on loan to (Turkey) Ankaragücü, previously on loan at Zalaegerszeg)

=== Paks ===
In:

No.	Pos.	Nation	Player
7	FW	HUN	Martin Ádám (free agent)
15	FW	HUN	Norbert Könyves (from Vasas)
25	GK	HUN	Péter Szappanos (on loan from (Saudi Arabia) Al-Fateh)
28	DF	HUN	Kristóf Hinora (from Vasas)
31	GK	HUN	Márk Gyetván (from Budapest Honvéd)
—	FW	HUN	Ákos Szendrei (from (Slovakia) Dunajská Streda)

Out:

No.	Pos.	Nation	Player
3	DF	HUN	Norbert Szélpál (free agent)
7	FW	HUN	Alen Skribek (on loan to Diósgyőr)
15	FW	HUN	Dávid Zimonyi (to Vasas)
20	DF	HUN	Krisztián Kovács (on loan to Nyíregyháza)
25	GK	HUN	Barnabás Simon (on loan to Diósgyőr)
28	MF	HUN	Dominik Földi (to Budapest Honvéd)
31	GK	HUN	Vilmos Borsos (to Zalaegerszeg)
—	MF	HUN	Patrik Nyári (on loan to Szentlőrinc)
—	FW	HUN	Ákos Szendrei (on loan to Mezőkövesd)

=== Puskás Akadémia ===
In:

No.	Pos.	Nation	Player
7	FW	GHA	Joel Fameyeh (from (Russia) Rubin Kazan)
21	DF	ARM	Georgy Arutyunyan (from (Russia) Krasnodar)

Out:

No.	Pos.	Nation	Player

=== Fehérvár ===
In:

No.	Pos.	Nation	Player
3	DF	BUL	Simeon Petrov (on loan from (Poland) Śląsk Wrocław)
5	DF	GEO	Aleksandre Kalandadze (on loan from (Georgia (country)) Dinamo Tbilisi)
9	FW	SRB	Ivan Šaponjić (free agent)
28	MF	SUI	Kristian Šekularac (from (England) Fulham)
44	GK	HUN	Botond Kemenes (on loan from Veszprém)

Out:

No.	Pos.	Nation	Player
3	DF	DEN	Kasper Larsen (retired)
9	FW	SLO	Nejc Gradišar (to (Egypt) Al Ahly)
14	DF	HUN	Áron Csongvai (to (Sweden) AIK)
75	GK	HUN	Dániel Veszelinov (to Szeged-Csanád)
97	FW	UKR	Daniel Kivinda (to (Romania) Farul Constanța)

=== Debrecen ===
In:

No.	Pos.	Nation	Player
8	MF	HUN	Tamás Szücs (from (Denmark) Copenhagen U19, previously on loan)
15	DF	SWE	Henrik Castegren (from (Sweden) Sirius)
20	MF	CAF	Amos Youga (from (Bulgaria) CSKA Sofia)
25	FW	BRA	Maurides (on loan from (Germany) FC St. Pauli)
26	DF	HUN	Ádám Lang (from (Cyprus) Omonia)
28	DF	AUT	Maximilian Hofmann (from (Austria) Rapid Wien)
33	MF	BUL	Kristiyan Malinov (from (Belgium) Kortrijk)
47	GK	HUN	Krisztián Hegyi (on loan from (England) West Ham United, previously on loan at (Scotland) Motherwell)
57	GK	JPN	Shūichi Gonda (free agent)

Out:

No.	Pos.	Nation	Player
14	DF	MNE	Meldin Drešković (to (Germany) Darmstadt 98)
19	FW	ISL	Thorleifur Úlfarsson (free agent)
23	MF	ARM	Zhirayr Shaghoyan (loan return to Ararat-Armenia)
24	FW	JPN	Naoaki Senaga (to (Uzbekistan) OKMK)
26	MF	BRA	Victor Braga (to (Kazakhstan) Tobol)
87	GK	HUN	Márk Engedi (on loan to Tiszakécske)
94	DF	MNE	Dušan Lagator (to (India) Kerala Blasters)

=== Kecskemét ===
In:

No.	Pos.	Nation	Player
12	DF	HUN	Lóránd Pászka (on loan from Ferencváros)
19	DF	HUN	Endre Botka (on loan from Ferencváros)
22	FW	MNE	Driton Camaj (from Kisvárda)
32	FW	ARG	Michael López (from (Finland) Lahti)

Out:

No.	Pos.	Nation	Player
14	MF	HUN	Kolos Kovács (on loan to Békéscsaba)
24	DF	HUN	Milán Papp (on loan to Gyirmót)
44	MF	HUN	Tamás Nikitscher (to (Spain) Valladolid)
70	MF	HUN	Dávid Artner (to (Croatia) Vukovar)
72	DF	HUN	Máté Kotula (on loan to Szeged-Csanád)

=== Diósgyőr ===
In:

No.	Pos.	Nation	Player
22	MF	CIV	Christ Tiéhi (from (England) Rotherham United)
51	GK	HUN	Barnabás Simon (on loan from Paks)
70	FW	HUN	Alen Skribek (on loan from Paks)
72	DF	HUN	Kevin Kállai (from Mezőkövesd)

Out:

No.	Pos.	Nation	Player
9	FW	GRE	Argyris Kampetsis (to (Cyprus) Karmiotissa)
29	MF	ARG	Franchu (to (Cyprus) Karmiotissa)
33	DF	IRL	Val Adedokun (loan return to (England) Brentford)
59	MF	ROU	Doru Popadiuc (to (Romania) Voluntari)
66	MF	HUN	Bálint Ferencsik (on loan to Békéscsaba)
72	DF	SRB	Daniel Farkaš (to Mezőkövesd)
75	FW	MAR	Moha Rharsalla (free agent)
87	FW	HUN	Vince Fekete (on loan to Putnok)
99	FW	MNE	Nikola Gluščević (to (Montenegro) Petrovac)

=== MTK ===
In:

No.	Pos.	Nation	Player
30	FW	HUN	Zsombor Gruber (on loan from Ferencváros)

Out:

No.	Pos.	Nation	Player
13	GK	HUN	Gergő Rácz (to Budapest Honvéd)

=== Zalaegerszeg ===
In:

No.	Pos.	Nation	Player
13	MF	NGR	Anderson Esiti (from Ferencváros)
19	FW	SVK	Ladislav Almási (on loan from (Czech Republic) Baník Ostrava, previously on loan at (Slovakia) Dunajská Streda)
89	GK	HUN	Vilmos Borsos (from Paks)
—	FW	GHA	Owusu (on loan from Ferencváros)

Out:

No.	Pos.	Nation	Player
7	FW	CRO	Kristian Fućak (loan return to (Croatia) Osijek)
13	DF	HUN	Dominik Csontos (to Budapest Honvéd)
30	DF	HUN	Sebő Deme (to Nagykanizsa)
77	FW	CRO	Josip Špoljarić (to (Slovenia) Nafta)
88	FW	HUN	Balázs Vogyicska (to Szeged-Csanád)
—	FW	GHA	Owusu (loan return to Ferencváros)

=== Újpest ===
In:

No.	Pos.	Nation	Player
6	MF	POL	Damian Rasak (from (Poland) Górnik Zabrze)
14	FW	GEO	Giorgi Beridze (from (Turkey) Kocaelispor)
34	FW	SLO	Milan Tučić (from (Slovenia) Bravo)

Out:

No.	Pos.	Nation	Player
25	DF	HUN	Nimród Baranyai (on loan to Kazincbarcika)

=== Nyíregyháza ===
In:

No.	Pos.	Nation	Player
10	MF	ROU	Ronaldo Deaconu (from (Romania) Hermannstadt)
21	DF	MKD	Darko Velkovski (free agent)
30	FW	GAM	Modou Lamin Marong (from (The Gambia) Steve Biko)
44	DF	CYP	Pavlos Korrea (from (Greece) Volos)
55	FW	SLO	Žan Medved (from (Slovakia) Košice)
66	DF	HUN	Barna Benczenleitner (from Budapest Honvéd)
90	DF	HUN	Krisztián Kovács (on loan from Paks)

Out:

No.	Pos.	Nation	Player
1	GK	HUN	Balázs Bese (on loan to Tatabánya)
10	FW	BRA	Myke Ramos (to Kazincbarcika)
13	DF	HUN	Gergő Gengeliczki (to Sényő)
18	FW	HUN	Benjámin Oláh (on loan to Mezőkövesd)
19	MF	HUN	Mátyás Gresó (to Mezőkövesd)
22	MF	HUN	Bence Pataki (on loan to Tiszakécske)
25	DF	BRA	Matheus Leoni (free agent)
44	DF	HUN	Ákos Baki (to Budapest Honvéd)
74	FW	SVK	Patrik Pinte (on loan to Budapest Honvéd)

=== Győr ===
In:

No.	Pos.	Nation	Player
8	MF	ALB	Ledio Beqja (from (Albania) Teuta)
11	FW	GAM	Nfansu Njie (from (Czech Republic) Varnsdorf)
19	DF	HUN	Barnabás Bíró (from Youth system)
27	MF	HUN	Milán Vitális (on loan from (Slovakia) Dunajská Streda)
30	DF	CRO	Dino Grozdanić (on loan from (Greece) Asteras Tripolis)
39	MF	HUN	Marcell Herczeg (from Youth system)

Out:

No.	Pos.	Nation	Player
4	DF	ARG	Luciano Vera (to (Albania) Tirana)
9	FW	MNE	Matija Krivokapić (on loan to (Slovakia) Komárno)
27	FW	SRB	Nenad Lukić (to (Serbia) Spartak Subotica)
42	DF	HUN	Dávid Koncz (on loan to (Slovakia) Šamorín)
55	FW	AUT	Christopher Kröhn (to (Austria) FAC)
—	FW	HUN	Alex Lacza (on loan to Kozármisleny, previously on loan at Szeged-Csanád)

== See also ==
- 2024–25 Nemzeti Bajnokság I
