= Roland Kersák =

Hungarian footballer (born 1997)

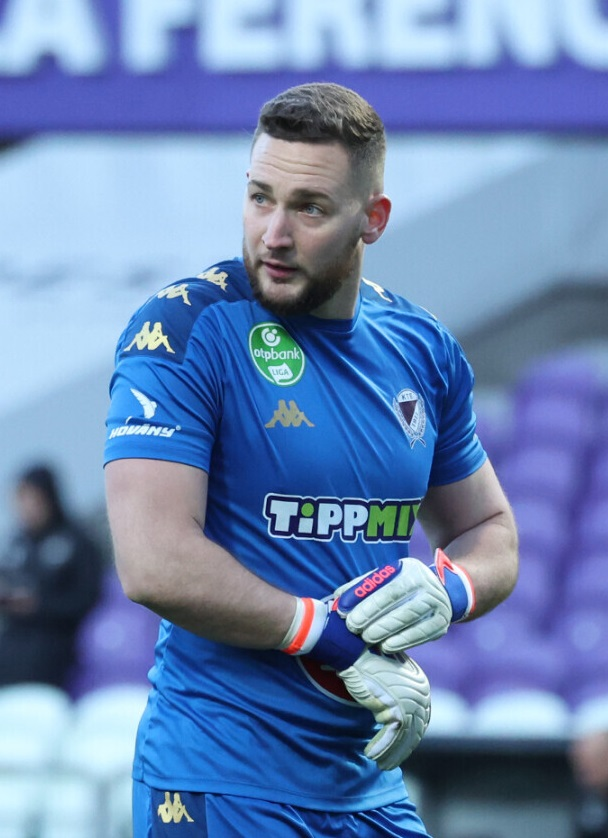
- Kersák playing for Kecskemét in 2024

Personal information
- Full name: Roland Attila Kersák
- Date of birth: 31 July 1997 (age 29)
- Place of birth: Budapest, Hungary
- Height: 1.90 m (6 ft 3 in)
- Position: Goalkeeper

Team information
- Current team: Nyíregyháza
- Number: 46

Youth career
- 2006–2011: Ferencváros
- 2011–2012: III. Kerület
- 2012: Honvéd
- 2012–2015: Ferencváros

Senior career*
Years	Team	Apps	(Gls)
2015–2017	Ferencváros II	4	(0)
2015–2016	→ Soroksár (loan)	0	(0)
2017	STC Salgótarján	2	(0)
2017–2019	Soroksár	0	(0)
2019	Rákosmente	2	(0)
2019–2021	Dabas	46	(0)
2019–2021	Dabas II	2	(0)
2021–2025	Kecskemét	30	(0)
2022–2024	Kecskemét II	23	(0)
2025–	Nyíregyháza	3	(0)
2025–	Nyíregyháza II	2	(0)

International career
2015	Hungary U18	1	(0)
- * Club domestic league appearances and goals as of 24 January 2026

Roland Attila Kersák (born 31 July 1997) is a Hungarian professional footballer who plays as a goalkeeper for Nemzeti Bajnokság I club Nyíregyháza.

== Career ==
On 7 June 2021, Nemzeti Bajnokság II club Kecskemét announced the signing of Kersák from Dabas. On 28 June 2022, the newly promoted Hungarian top-flight club announced the contract extension of Kersák, alongside fellow goalkeeper Bence Varga.

On 15 July 2025, he joined Nemzeti Bajnokság I club Nyíregyháza.

== Career statistics ==
=== Club ===
As of match played 24 January 2026

Appearances and goals by club, season and competition
Club	Season	League			Magyar Kupa		Total	
Club	Season	Division	Apps	Goals	Apps	Goals	Apps	Goals
Ferencváros II	2015–16	Nemzeti Bajnokság III	0	0	—		0	0
Ferencváros II	2016–17	Nemzeti Bajnokság III	4	0	—		4	0
Ferencváros II	Total		4	0	—		4	0
Soroksár	2015–16	Nemzeti Bajnokság II	0	0	—		0	0
STC Salgótarján	2016–17	Nemzeti Bajnokság III	2	0	—		2	0
Soroksár	2017–18	Nemzeti Bajnokság II	0	0	—		0	0
Rákosmente	2018–19	Nemzeti Bajnokság III	2	0	—		2	0
Dabas	2019–20	Nemzeti Bajnokság III	9	0	1	0	10	0
Dabas	2020–21	Nemzeti Bajnokság III	37	0	0	0	37	0
Dabas	Total		46	0	1	0	47	0
Dabas II	2019–20	Megyei Bajnokság II	1	0	—		1	0
Dabas II	2020–21	Megyei Bajnokság II	1	0	—		1	0
Dabas II	Total		2	0	—		2	0
Kecskemét	2021–22	Nemzeti Bajnokság II	6	0	3	0	9	0
Kecskemét	2022–23	Nemzeti Bajnokság I	0	0	0	0	0	0
Kecskemét	2023–24	Nemzeti Bajnokság I	2	0	2	0	4	0
Kecskemét	2024–25	Nemzeti Bajnokság I	22	0	1	0	23	0
Kecskemét	Total		30	0	6	0	36	0
Kecskemét II	2022–23	Nemzeti Bajnokság III	19	0	—		19	0
Kecskemét II	2023–24	Nemzeti Bajnokság III	3	0	—		3	0
Kecskemét II	2024–25	Nemzeti Bajnokság III	1	0	—		1	0
Kecskemét II	Total		23	0	—		23	0
Nyíregyháza	2025–26	Nemzeti Bajnokság I	3	0	1	0	4	0
Nyíregyháza II	2025–26	Nemzeti Bajnokság III	2	0	—		2	0
Career total			114	0	8	0	122	0

=== International ===
Appearances and goals by national team and year
Team	Year	Total	
Team	Year	Apps	Goals
Hungary U18	2015	1	0
Career total		1	0
