= Levente Katona =

Hungarian footballer (born 2001)

Personal information
- Date of birth: 31 December 2001 (age 24)
- Place of birth: Mohács, Hungary
- Height: 1.87 m (6 ft 2 in)
- Position: Defender

Team information
- Current team: Nyíregyháza
- Number: 31

Youth career
- 2007–2013: Mohács
- 2013: Pécs
- 2013–2014: Kozármisleny
- 2014–2019: Pécs

Senior career*
Years	Team	Apps	(Gls)
2018–2023	Pécs	122	(3)
2023–2025	Kecskemét	45	(2)
2023–2025	Kecskemét II	3	(0)
2025–	Nyíregyháza	28	(1)
- * Club domestic league appearances and goals as of 30 May 2026

Levente Katona (born 31 December 2001) is a Hungarian professional footballer, who plays as a defender for Nemzeti Bajnokság I club Nyíregyháza.

== Career ==
On 20 June 2023, Katona signed for Nemzeti Bajnokság I club Kecskemét.

On 12 August 2025, he was bought-out of his contract by Nemzeti Bajnokság I side Nyíregyháza and signed a three-year contract with them. It was reported on the club website that Katona chose the team mainly for his former manager, István Szabó and the incredible atmosphere at the matches.

== Career statistics ==
As of match played 23 May 2025

Appearances and goals by club, season and competition
Club	Season	League			National cup (Note: Includes Magyar Kupa)		Europe		Total	
Club	Season	Division	Apps	Goals	Apps	Goals	Apps	Goals	Apps	Goals
Pécs	2018–19	Nemzeti Bajnokság III	14	1	1	0	—		15	1
Pécs	2019–20	Nemzeti Bajnokság III	4	0	4	0	—		8	0
Pécs	2020–21	Nemzeti Bajnokság II	33	0	1	0	—		34	0
Pécs	2021–22	Nemzeti Bajnokság II	36	2	1	0	—		37	2
Pécs	2022–23	Nemzeti Bajnokság II	35	0	1	0	—		36	0
Pécs	Total		122	3	8	0	—		130	3
Kecskemét	2023–24	Nemzeti Bajnokság I	15	0	1	1	1 (Note: Appearance in UEFA Europa Conference League)	0	17	1
Kecskemét	2024–25	Nemzeti Bajnokság I	30	2	2	0	—		32	2
Kecskemét	Total		45	2	3	1	1	0	49	3
Kecskemét II	2023–24	Nemzeti Bajnokság III	3	0	—		—		3	0
Nyíregyháza	2025–26	Nemzeti Bajnokság I	0	0	0	0	—		0	0
Career total			170	5	11	1	1	0	182	6
