= Márton Vattay =

Hungarian footballer (born 2005)

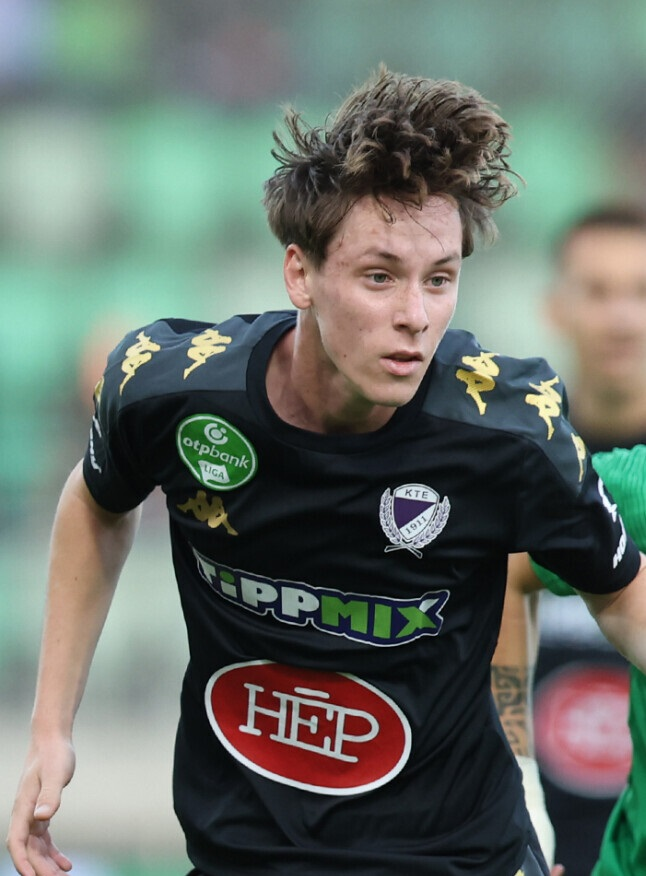
- Vattay playing for Kecskemét in 2024

Personal information
- Date of birth: 9 October 2005 (age 21)
- Place of birth: Budapest, Hungary
- Height: 1.81 m (5 ft 11 in)
- Position: Midfielder

Team information
- Current team: Putnok (on loan from Kecskemét)

Youth career
- 2011–2017: Sze-Fi
- 2017–2019: Dunakeszi
- 2019–2023: Újpest

Senior career*
Years	Team	Apps	(Gls)
2023	Eger	16	(0)
2023	Eger II	1	(0)
2023–2024	Putnok	28	(1)
2024–	Kecskemét	15	(0)
2024–2025	Kecskemét II	13	(3)
2026–	→ Putnok (loan)	0	(0)
- * Club domestic league appearances and goals as of 30 November 2025

Márton Vattay (born 9 October 2005) is a Hungarian professional footballer who plays as a midfielder for Nemzeti Bajnokság III club Putnok on loan from Nemzeti Bajnokság II club Kecskemét.

== Career ==
Vattay began his youth career in Szentendre before moving from Dunakeszi to the academy of Újpest, later making his senior debut with Eger during the 2022–23 season, where he featured in 16 Nemzeti Bajnokság III matches. He joined Putnok in the summer of 2023 and became a regular starter, playing 32 league matches and scoring twice as the club won its NB III group and advanced to the promotion play-offs. On 14 June 2024, Vattay signed for Nemzeti Bajnokság I club Kecskemét after his breakthrough season in the third tier.

Following his arrival at Kecskemét in the summer of 2024, Vattay made 13 appearances in the NB I. After the club's relegation, he struggled to secure regular playing time in the Nemzeti Bajnokság II, featuring only twice as a substitute during the 2025–26 season. On 9 January 2026, he was loaned to Nemzeti Bajnokság III side Putnok until the end of the campaign in order to gain more consistent match experience.

== Career statistics ==
As of match played 30 November 2025

Appearances and goals by club, season and competition
Club	Season	League			Magyar Kupa		Other		Total	
Club	Season	Division	Apps	Goals	Apps	Goals	Apps	Goals	Apps	Goals
Eger	2022–23	Nemzeti Bajnokság III	16	0	—		—		16	0
Eger II	2022–23	Megyei Bajnokság I	1	0	—		—		1	0
Putnok	2023–24	Nemzeti Bajnokság III	28	1	2	1	2 (Note: Appearances in Nemzeti Bajnokság III promotion play-offs)	0	32	2
Kecskemét	2024–25	Nemzeti Bajnokság I	13	0	0	0	—		13	0
Kecskemét	2025–26	Nemzeti Bajnokság II	2	0	0	0	—		2	0
Kecskemét	Total		15	0	0	0	—		15	0
Kecskemét II	2024–25	Nemzeti Bajnokság III	13	3	—		—		13	3
Putnok (loan)	2025–26	Nemzeti Bajnokság III	0	0	—		—		0	0
Career total			73	4	2	1	2	0	77	5

== Honours ==
Putnok

- Nemzeti Bajnokság III – Northeast: 2023–24
