= Gergő Pálinkás =

Hungarian footballer (born 1996)

Personal information
- Full name: Gergő János Pálinkás
- Date of birth: 22 December 1996 (age 29)
- Place of birth: Mátészalka, Hungary
- Position: Forward

Team information
- Current team: Kecskemét
- Number: 7

Youth career
- 2005–2007: Terem
- 2007–2009: Görög Focisuli-KGYFC
- 2009–2011: Nyírbátor
- 2011–2015: Nyíregyházi Sportcentrum

Senior career*
Years	Team	Apps	(Gls)
2015–2017	Nyíregyháza Spartacus	33	(1)
2017–2019	Nyírbátor	52	(7)
2019–2021	Jászberény	55	(25)
2021–2022	Dorog	13	(1)
2022–2023	Kazincbarcika	51	(19)
2023–	Kecskemét	64	(12)
2023–	Kecskemét II	5	(5)
- * Club domestic league appearances and goals as of 10 August 2025

Gergő Pálinkás (born 22 December 1996) is a Hungarian professional footballer, who plays as a forward for Nemzeti Bajnokság II club Kecskemét.

== Career ==
On 7 June 2023, Pálinkás signed for Nemzeti Bajnokság I side Kecskemét.

== Career statistics ==
As of match played 10 August 2025

Appearances and goals by club, season and competition
Club	Season	League			National cup (Note: Includes Magyar Kupa)		Europe		Total	
Club	Season	Division	Apps	Goals	Apps	Goals	Apps	Goals	Apps	Goals
Nyíregyháza	2015–16	Nemzeti Bajnokság III	19	1	4	0	—		23	1
Nyíregyháza	2016–17	Nemzeti Bajnokság II	14	0	0	0	—		14	0
Nyíregyháza	Total		33	1	4	0	—		37	1
Nyírbátor	2017–18	Nemzeti Bajnokság III	25	2	1	0	—		26	2
Nyírbátor	2018–19	Nemzeti Bajnokság III	27	5	1	0	—		28	5
Nyírbátor	Total		52	7	2	0	—		54	7
Jászberény	2019–20	Nemzeti Bajnokság III	19	9	—		—		19	9
Jászberény	2020–21	Nemzeti Bajnokság III	36	16	1	0	—		37	16
Jászberény	Total		55	25	1	0	—		56	25
Dorog	2021–22	Nemzeti Bajnokság II	13	1	1	0	—		14	1
Kazincbarcika	2021–22	Nemzeti Bajnokság III	14	9	—		—		14	9
Kazincbarcika	2022–23	Nemzeti Bajnokság II	37	10	2	0	—		39	10
Kazincbarcika	Total		51	19	2	0	—		53	19
Kecskemét	2023–24	Nemzeti Bajnokság I	30	7	4	1	2 (Note: Appearances in UEFA Europa Conference League)	1	36	9
Kecskemét	2024–25	Nemzeti Bajnokság I	31	4	2	0	—		33	4
Kecskemét	2025–26	Nemzeti Bajnokság II	3	1	0	0	—		3	1
Kecskemét	Total		64	12	6	1	2	1	72	14
Kecskemét II	2023–24	Nemzeti Bajnokság III	2	2	—		—		2	2
Kecskemét II	2024–25	Nemzeti Bajnokság III	3	3	—		—		3	3
Kecskemét II	Total		5	5	—		—		5	5
Career total			273	70	16	1	2	1	291	72

== Honours ==
Nyíregyháza

- Nemzeti Bajnokság III – East: 2015–16

Kazincbarcika

- Nemzeti Bajnokság III – East: 2021–22
