= Soma Szuhodovszki =

Hungarian footballer

Personal information
- Full name: Soma Szuhodovszki
- Date of birth: 30 December 1999 (age 26)
- Place of birth: Budapest, Hungary
- Height: 1.82 m (5 ft 11 1/2 in)
- Position: Centre midfielder

Team information
- Current team: Debrecen
- Number: 13

Youth career
- 2007–2008: RTK A
- 2008–2011: Újbuda TC
- 2011–2016: MTK Budapest

Senior career*
Years	Team	Apps	(Gls)
2016–2018	MTK Budapest II	46	(13)
2018	MTK Budapest	3	(0)
2018–2019	→ Monor (loan)	32	(4)
2019–2020	→ Tiszakécske (loan)	22	(0)
2020–2021	→ Győri ETO (loan)	8	(0)
2021–2023	Kecskemét	81	(10)
2024–	Debrecen	67	(4)

International career^{‡}
2023	Hungary	1	(0)
- * Club domestic league appearances and goals as of 30 May 2026 ‡ National team caps and goals as of 19 November 2023

Soma Szuhodovszki (born 30 December 1999) is a Hungarian football player currently playing for the Nemzeti Bajnokság team Debreceni VSC and the Hungary national team as a midfielder.

== Club career ==
=== MTK Budapest ===
Born in Budapest, Szuhodovszki was signed in 2016 by Hungarian League club MTK Budapest FC.

=== Kecskemét ===
On 21 July 2021, Szuhodovszki was signed by Hungarian League club Kecskeméti TE.

=== Debrecen ===
On 22 December 2023, Szuhodovszki was signed by Hungarian League club Debreceni VSC.

== Career statistics ==
=== Club ===
As of match played 14 December 2024

Appearances and goals by club, season and competition
Club	Season	League			National cup (Note: Include Magyar Kupa)		League cup (Note: Include Ligakupa)		Europe		Total	
Club	Season	Division	Apps	Goals	Apps	Goals	Apps	Goals	Apps	Goals	Apps	Goals
MTK Budapest	2016–17	Nemzeti Bajnokság III	25	4	0	0	—		—		25	4
MTK Budapest	2017–18	Nemzeti Bajnokság II	3	0	1	0	—		—		4	0
MTK Budapest	2017–18	Nemzeti Bajnokság III	21	9	0	0	—		—		21	9
MTK Budapest	Total		49	13	1	0	—		—		50	13
Monor (loan)	2018–19	Nemzeti Bajnokság II	32	4	2	1	—		—		34	5
Tiszakécske (loan)	2019–20	Nemzeti Bajnokság II	22	0	1	0	—		—		23	0
Győri ETO (loan)	2020–21	Nemzeti Bajnokság II	8	0	2	0	—		—		10	0
Kecskemét	2021–22	Nemzeti Bajnokság II	35	5	3	1	—		—		38	6
Kecskemét	2022–23	Nemzeti Bajnokság I	32	3	2	0	—		—		34	3
Kecskemét	2023–24	Nemzeti Bajnokság I	14	2	2	0	—		—		16	2
Kecskemét	Total		81	10	7	1	—		—		88	11
Debrecen	2023–24	Nemzeti Bajnokság I	16	0	1	0	—		—		17	0
Debrecen	2024–25	Nemzeti Bajnokság I	13	1	2	0	—		—		15	1
Debrecen	Total		29	1	3	0	—		—		32	1
Career total			221	28	16	2	0	0	0	0	237	30

=== International ===
He made his debut for Hungary national football team on 19 November 2023 in UEFA Euro 2024 qualifying match against Montenegro, as a 94th-minute substitute for Ádám Nagy.

As of match played on 19 November 2023

Appearances and goals by national team and year
National team	Year	Apps	Goals
Hungary
Hungary	2023	1	0
Total		1	0

== Honours ==
Individual

- Nemzeti Bajnokság I Goal of the Month: October 2023
