= Kolos Kovács =

Hungarian footballer (born 2005)

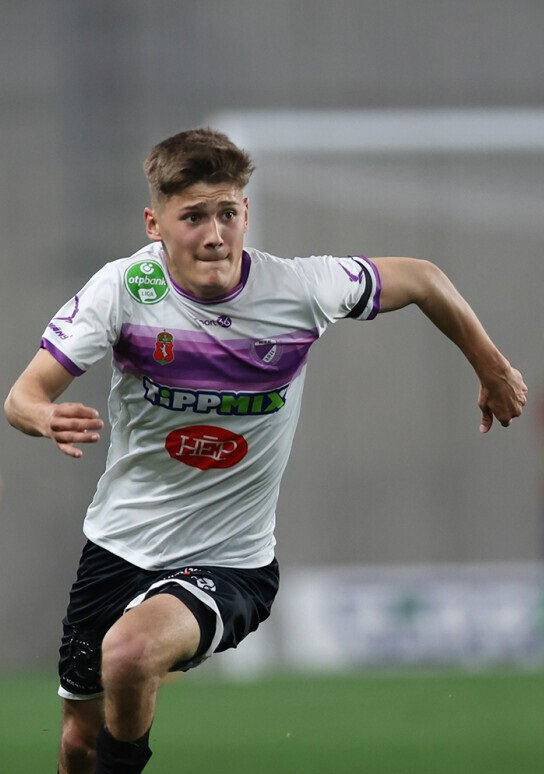
- Kovács playing for Kecskemét in 2024

Personal information
- Date of birth: 19 February 2005 (age 21)
- Place of birth: Cegléd, Hungary
- Height: 1.75 m (5 ft 9 in)
- Position: Midfielder

Team information
- Current team: Hódmezővásárhely (on loan from Kecskemét)
- Number: 15

Youth career
- 2011–2023: Cegléd

Senior career*
Years	Team	Apps	(Gls)
2021–2023	Cegléd	50	(3)
2023–2024	Kecskemét II	35	(4)
2023–	Kecskemét	3	(0)
2024	→ Tiszakécske (loan)	2	(0)
2025	→ Békéscsaba (loan)	9	(0)
2025	→ Békéscsaba II (loan)	3	(0)
2025–	→ Hódmezővásárhely (loan)	9	(1)

International career^{‡}
2021–2022	Hungary U17	8	(0)
- * Club domestic league appearances and goals as of 23 November 2025 ‡ National team caps and goals as of 30 March 2022

Kolos Kovács (born 19 February 2005) is a Hungarian professional footballer who plays as a midfielder for Nemzeti Bajnokság III club Hódmezővásárhely on loan from Nemzeti Bajnokság II club Kecskemét.

== Career ==
Kovács was born in 2005 in Cegléd and began his football career in his hometown with Ceglédi Vasutas, progressing through the youth ranks and regularly playing above his age group. He made his senior debut for Cegléd during the 2021–22 season at the age of 16. He went on to make 20 competitive appearances in the Nemzeti Bajnokság III and the Magyar Kupa, scoring once in the latter competition, and in 2022–23 he became a regular starter, making 27 starts and six substitute appearances while scoring three league goals. On 2 July 2023, he signed for Nemzeti Bajnokság I club Kecskemét on a permanent transfer following a successful trial period.

On 11 September 2025, he was loaned to Nemzeti Bajnokság III side Hódmezővásárhely on a one-year contract.

== Career statistics ==
=== Club ===
As of match played 23 November 2025

Appearances and goals by club, season and competition
Club	Season	League			Magyar Kupa		Total	
Club	Season	Division	Apps	Goals	Apps	Goals	Apps	Goals
Cegléd	2021–22	Nemzeti Bajnokság III	17	0	3	1	20	1
Cegléd	2022–23	Nemzeti Bajnokság III	33	3	1	0	34	3
Cegléd	Total		50	3	4	1	54	4
Kecskemét II	2023–24	Nemzeti Bajnokság III	25	3	—		25	3
Kecskemét II	2024–25	Nemzeti Bajnokság III	10	1	—		10	1
Kecskemét II	Total		35	4	—		35	4
Kecskemét	2023–24	Nemzeti Bajnokság I	2	0	0	0	2	0
Kecskemét	2024–25	Nemzeti Bajnokság I	1	0	1	0	2	0
Kecskemét	Total		3	0	1	0	4	0
Tiszakécske (loan)	2023–24	Nemzeti Bajnokság II	2	0	—		2	0
Békéscsaba (loan)	2024–25	Nemzeti Bajnokság II	9	0	—		9	0
Békéscsaba II (loan)	2024–25	Megyei Bajnokság I	3	0	—		3	0
Hódmezővásárhely (loan)	2025–26	Nemzeti Bajnokság III	9	1	—		9	1
Career total			111	8	5	1	116	9

=== International ===
Appearances and goals by national team and year
Team	Year	Total	
Team	Year	Apps	Goals
Hungary U17	2021	3	0
Hungary U17	2022	5	0
Hungary U17	Total	8	0
Career total		8	0

== Honours ==
Békéscsaba II

- Megyei Bajnokság I – Békés: 2024–25
