= Valentin Hadaró =

Hungarian footballer (born 1995)

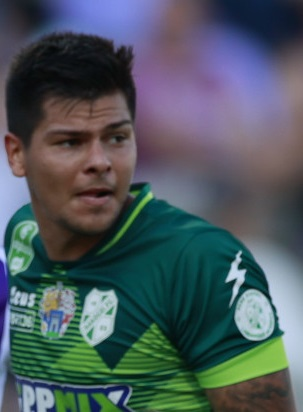
- Hadaró playing for Kaposvár in 2020

Personal information
- Date of birth: 8 June 1995 (age 31)
- Place of birth: Kaposvár, Hungary
- Height: 1.85 m (6 ft 1 in)
- Position: Left-back

Team information
- Current team: Pécs
- Number: 32

Youth career
- 2005–2010: Felcsút
- 2010–2014: Kaposvár

Senior career*
Years	Team	Apps	(Gls)
2014–2015	Kaposvár	28	(0)
2015	Kisvárda	1	(0)
2015–2021	Kaposvár	129	(5)
2021–2023	Kecskemét	32	(1)
2022	→ Pécs (loan)	17	(1)
2023–	Pécs	7	(0)
- * Club domestic league appearances and goals as of 21 December 2023

Valentin Hadaró (born 8 June 1995) is a Hungarian football player who plays for Pécs.

== Club career ==
In July 2021, Hadaró signed for Kecskemét.

== Career statistics ==
Appearances and goals by club, season and competition
Club	Season	League			Cup		League Cup		Europe		Total	
Club	Season	Division	Apps	Goals	Apps	Goals	Apps	Goals	Apps	Goals	Apps	Goals
Kaposvár
Kaposvár	2013–14	Nemzeti Bajnokság I	3	0	0	0	2	0	—		5	0
Kaposvár	2014–15	Nemzeti Bajnokság II	25	0	1	0	6	1	—		32	1
Kaposvár	2016–17	Nemzeti Bajnokság III	31	1	0	0	—		—		31	1
Kaposvár	2017–18	Nemzeti Bajnokság III	26	2	0	0	—		—		26	2
Kaposvár	2018–19	Nemzeti Bajnokság II	31	1	0	0	—		—		31	1
Kaposvár	2019–20	Nemzeti Bajnokság I	16	0	3	0	—		—		19	0
Kaposvár	Total		132	4	4	0	8	1	0	0	144	5
Kisvárda	2015–16	Nemzeti Bajnokság II	1	0	1	0	—		—		2	0
Career total			133	4	5	0	8	1	0	0	146	5

Updated to games played as of 27 June 2020.
