= Kornél Szűcs =

Hungarian footballer

Personal information
- Date of birth: 24 September 2001 (age 25)
- Place of birth: Miskolc, Hungary
- Height: 1.90 m (6 ft 3 in)
- Position: Centre-back

Team information
- Current team: Vojvodina
- Number: 26

Youth career
- 2012–2020: Diósgyőr

Senior career*
| Years | Team | Apps | (Gls) |
| 2019–2023 | Diósgyőr | 46 | (0) |
| 2019–2023 | → Diósgyőr II | 47 | (3) |
| 2019–2021 | → Kazincbarcika (loan) | 16 | (1) |
| 2023–2024 | Kecskemét | 29 | (0) |
| 2024–2026 | Plymouth Argyle | 57 | (0) |
| 2026– | Vojvodina | 24 | (0) |

International career^{‡}
| 2016 | Hungary U17 | 2 | (0) |
| 2018–2019 | Hungary U18 | 10 | (1) |
| 2019–2020 | Hungary U19 | 5 | (0) |
| 2020–2021 | Hungary U21 | 3 | (0) |
| 2024– | Hungary | 2 | (0) |
- * Club domestic league appearances and goals as of 22 November 2026 ‡ National team caps and goals as of 6 June 2026

Kornél Szűcs (born 24 September 2001) is a Hungarian professional footballer who plays as a centre-back for Vojvodina and the Hungary national team.

== Club career ==
=== Diósgyőr ===
On 30 May, Szűcs played his first match for Diósgyőr in a 1–0 win against Mezőkövesd in the Hungarian League.

In his first match, he immediately became the best player of the round.

=== Kecskemét ===
In June 2023, it was announced that Szűcs will join Kecskemét, from the 2023-24 season.

=== Plymouth Argyle ===
On 5 August 2024, Szűcs signed for EFL Championship side Plymouth Argyle for an undisclosed fee.

=== FK Vojvodina ===
On 13 February 2026, Szűcs joined Serbian SuperLiga side Vojvodina for an undisclosed fee.

== International career ==
Szűcs made his debut for the Hungary national team on 14 October 2024 in a UEFA Nations League game against Bosnia and Herzegovina at the Bilino Polje Stadium. He substituted Zsolt Nagy in the 87th minute, as Hungary won 2–0.

== Career statistics ==
=== Club ===
As of 22 November 2026

Appearances and goals by club, season and competition
| Club | Season | League | | | National cup (Note: Includes Magyar Kupa) | | League cup (Note: Includes EFL Cup) | | Continental | | Other | | Total | |
| Club | Season | Division | Apps | Goals | Apps | Goals | Apps | Goals | Apps | Goals | Apps | Goals | Apps | Goals |
|---|---|---|---|---|---|---|---|---|---|---|---|---|---|---|
| Diósgyőr | 2018–19 | Nemzeti Bajnokság I | 0 | 0 | 0 | 0 | — | | — | | — | | 0 | 0 |
| Diósgyőr | 2019–20 | Nemzeti Bajnokság I | 5 | 0 | 1 | 0 | — | | — | | — | | 6 | 0 |
| Diósgyőr | 2020–21 | Nemzeti Bajnokság I | 15 | 0 | 3 | 0 | — | | — | | — | | 18 | 0 |
| Diósgyőr | 2021–22 | Nemzeti Bajnokság II | 23 | 0 | 1 | 0 | — | | — | | — | | 24 | 0 |
| Diósgyőr | 2022–23 | Nemzeti Bajnokság II | 3 | 0 | 0 | 0 | — | | — | | — | | 3 | 0 |
| Diósgyőr | Total | | 46 | 0 | 5 | 0 | — | | — | | — | | 51 | 0 |
| Diósgyőr II (loan) | 2018–19 | Nemzeti Bajnokság III | 25 | 3 | — | | — | | — | | — | | 25 | 3 |
| Diósgyőr II (loan) | 2019–20 | Nemzeti Bajnokság III | 10 | 0 | — | | — | | — | | — | | 10 | 0 |
| Diósgyőr II (loan) | 2020–21 | Nemzeti Bajnokság III | 1 | 0 | — | | — | | — | | — | | 1 | 0 |
| Diósgyőr II (loan) | 2021–22 | Nemzeti Bajnokság III | 1 | 0 | — | | — | | — | | — | | 1 | 0 |
| Diósgyőr II (loan) | 2022–23 | Nemzeti Bajnokság III | 10 | 0 | — | | — | | — | | — | | 10 | 0 |
| Diósgyőr II (loan) | Total | | 47 | 3 | 0 | 0 | — | | — | | — | | 47 | 3 |
| Kazincbarcika (loan) | 2019–20 | Nemzeti Bajnokság II | 4 | 0 | 0 | 0 | — | | — | | — | | 4 | 0 |
| Kazincbarcika (loan) | 2020–21 | Nemzeti Bajnokság II | 12 | 1 | 0 | 0 | — | | — | | — | | 12 | 1 |
| Kazincbarcika (loan) | Total | | 16 | 1 | 0 | 0 | — | | — | | — | | 16 | 1 |
| Kecskemét | 2023–24 | Nemzeti Bajnokság I | 28 | 0 | 4 | 0 | — | | 2 (Note: Appearances in UEFA Europa Conference League) | 0 | — | | 34 | 0 |
| Kecskemét | 2024–25 | Nemzeti Bajnokság I | 1 | 0 | 0 | 0 | — | | — | | — | | 1 | 0 |
| Kecskemét | Total | | 29 | 0 | 4 | 0 | — | | 2 | 0 | — | | 35 | 0 |
| Plymouth Argyle | 2024–25 | EFL Championship | 36 | 0 | 2 | 0 | 2 | 0 | — | | — | | 40 | 0 |
| Plymouth Argyle | 2025–26 | League One | 21 | 0 | 1 | 0 | 1 | 0 | — | | 2 (Note: Appearances in EFL Trophy) | 0 | 25 | 0 |
| Plymouth Argyle | Total | | 57 | 0 | 3 | 0 | 3 | 0 | — | | 2 | 0 | 65 | 0 |
| Vojvodina | 2025–26 | Serbian SuperLiga | 9 | 0 | 3 | 1 | — | | — | | — | | 12 | 1 |
| Vojvodina | 2026–27 | Serbian SuperLiga | 15 | 0 | 1 | 0 | — | | 3 | 0 | — | | 19 | 0 |
| Vojvodina | Total | | 24 | 0 | 4 | 1 | — | | 3 | 0 | — | | 31 | 1 |
| Career total | | | 219 | 4 | 16 | 1 | 3 | 0 | 5 | 0 | 2 | 0 | 245 | 5 |

=== International ===
As of match played 5 June 2026

Appearances and goals by national team and year
| National team | Year | Apps | Goals |
|---|---|---|---|
| Hungary | 2024 | 1 | 0 |
| Hungary | 2026 | 1 | 0 |
| Total | | 2 | 0 |
