= Mykhaylo Ryashko =

Ukrainian footballer

Personal information
- Full name: Mykhaylo Viktorovych Ryashko
- Date of birth: 5 November 1996 (age 30)
- Place of birth: Mukacheve, Zakarpattia Oblast, Ukraine
- Height: 1.95 m (6 ft 5 in)
- Position: Centre-back

Team information
- Current team: Szeged-Csanád
- Number: 32

Youth career
- –2007: Mukacheve
- 2007–2009: Dynamo Kyiv
- 2009–2010: UFK-Karpaty Lviv
- 2011–2013: Mukacheve

Senior career*
Years	Team	Apps	(Gls)
2013–2014	Hoverla Uzhhorod	0	(0)
2015	Balmazújváros	1	(0)
2015–2016	Hoverla Uzhhorod	17	(0)
2016	Illichivets Mariupol	0	(0)
2016	→ Illichivets-2 Mariupol	8	(2)
2017–2019	Kisvárda	31	(2)
2020–2021	Dorogi	36	(1)
2021–2023	Kecskeméti	48	(1)
2023–2024	Nyíregyháza	17	(0)
2024–2025	Kecskeméti	8	(0)
2025–	Szeged-Csanád	9	(0)
- * Club domestic league appearances and goals as of 31 May 2026

Mykhaylo Ryashko (Ukrainian: Михайло Вікторович Ряшко; born 5 November 1996) is a Ukrainian professional footballer who plays as a midfielder for Hungarian club Szeged-Csanád.

== Career ==
Ryashko spent some years in the Sportive Youth systems in Dynamo Kyiv, UFC-Karpaty and FC Mukacheve. He made his debut in the Ukrainian Premier League for club FC Hoverla Uzhhorod in a match against FC Dnipro Dnipropetrovsk entraining in the second half-time on 19 July 2015.

== Personal life ==
He is the son of Ukrainian football manager Viktor Ryashko and younger brother of the Ukrainian footballer of the same name, Viktor Ryashko Jr.
