= Tamás Nikitscher =

Hungarian footballer

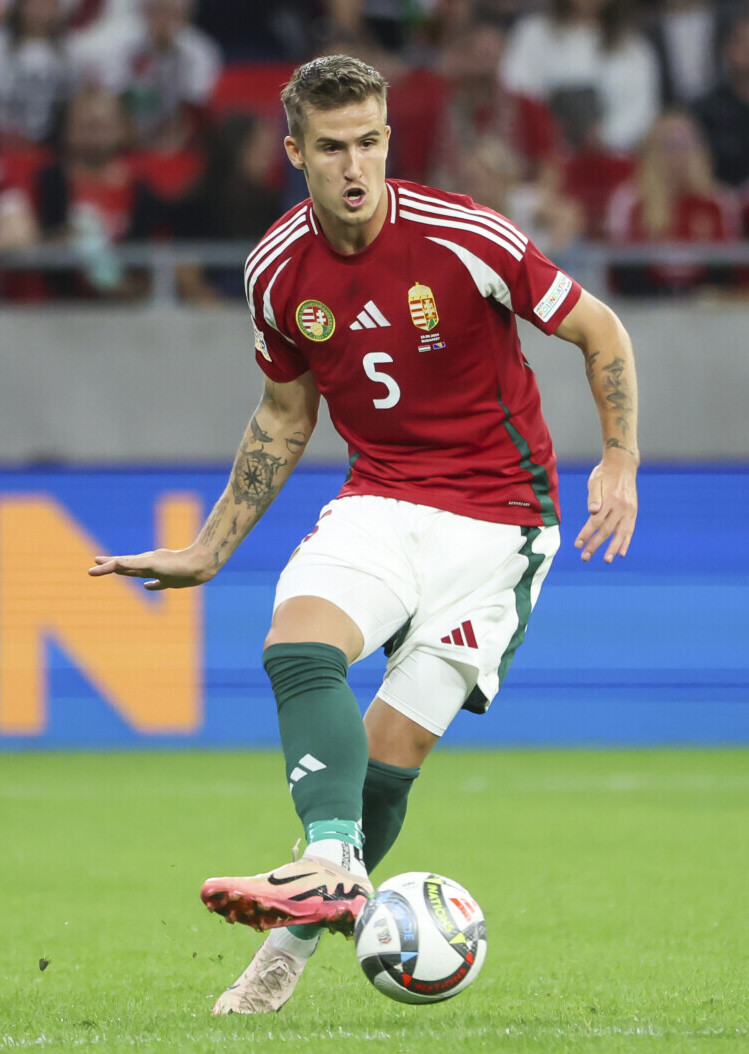
- Nikitscher with Hungary in 2024

Personal information
- Date of birth: 3 November 1999 (age 27)
- Place of birth: Zalaegerszeg, Hungary
- Height: 1.93 m (6 ft 4 in)
- Position: Central midfielder

Team information
- Current team: Rio Ave
- Number: 44

Youth career
- Teskánd KSE
- –2013: Zalaegerszeg
- 2013: Haladás
- 2013–2017: Zalaegerszeg
- 2017-2018: Debrecen

Senior career*
Years	Team	Apps	(Gls)
2018–2021	Debrecen II	10	(1)
2020–2021	→ DEAC (loan)	23	(1)
2021–2022	Makó	16	(3)
2022–2023	PMFC	37	(2)
2023–2025	Kecskemét	37	(3)
2025	Valladolid	14	(0)
2025–	Rio Ave	27	(1)

International career^{‡}
2024–	Hungary	9	(0)
- * Club domestic league appearances and goals as of 15 May 2026 ‡ National team caps and goals as of 6 June 2025

Tamás Nikitscher (born 3 November 1999) is a Hungarian football player who plays as a central midfielder for Portuguese Primeira Liga club Rio Ave and the Hungary national team.

== Career ==
=== Kecskemét ===
On 29 January 2023, he debuted in Kecskemét in a 2–1 victory over Fehérvár FC in the 2022–23 Nemzeti Bajnokság I season. The team finished the season as runner-up in the league.

In the 2023–24 Nemzeti Bajnokság I season, he played only six matches due to an injury. However, he scored his first goal for Kecskemét in a 2–1 victory over Zalaegerszegi TE in the 2023–24 Nemzeti Bajnokság I season.

In the 2024–25 Nemzeti Bajnokság I season, he scored his first and second goals in a 2–1 victory over Győri ETO FC on 16 August 2024.

=== Valladolid ===
On 29 January 2025, Nikitscher was signed by La Liga team Real Valladolid. He debuted in a 5–1 defeat against Villarreal CF on the 22nd game week of the 2024–25 La Liga season. He entered the pitch as a substitute for Stanko Jurić in the 71st minute. On the 23rd match day, Nikitscher was included in the starting lineup and was not substituted. However, his team were defeated 1–0 by Rayo Vallecano on 7 February 2025. He ended up playing in a total of 13 matches for the team during the season but eventually, they were relegated from the first division.

On 15 August 2025, he debuted in La Liga 2 in a 3–0 win against AD Ceuta FC.

=== Rio Ave ===
On 1 September 2025, he was signed by Primeira Liga club Rio Ave. He debuted in the 2025–26 Primeira Liga in Rio Ave in a 3–1 defeat against Moreirense F.C. as a substitute for Liavas in the 85th minute at the Parque de Jogos Comendador Joaquim de Almeida Freitas on 13 September 2025. On 23 September 2025, he gave an assist to André Luiz in a 1–1 draw against S.L. Benfica at the Estádio da Luz in the 2025–26 Primeira Liga.

== International career ==
Nikitscher made his debut for the Hungary national team on 7 September 2024 in a Nations League game against Germany at the Merkur Spiel-Arena. He substituted Ádám Nagy in the 82nd minute as Germany won 5–0. In 2025 and 2025, he has not received any invitations from Marco Rossi. Rossi said "You were wrong to think he could be a starter. He played in a few Nations League matches for us, but there are better players than him at the six and eight positions in the Hungarian league as well. If I call him up, I’ll have to decide who to leave out Rajmund Tóth, Tamás Szűcs, Norbert Szendrei, Callum Styles, and András Schäfer are all there. I can’t call up 150 midfielders to the squad."

== Career statistics ==
=== Club ===
As of match played 15 January 2026

Appearances and goals by club, season and competition
Club	Season	League			National cup		Continental		Other		Total	
Club	Season	Division	Apps	Goals	Apps	Goals	Apps	Goals	Apps	Goals	Apps	Goals
Debrecen	2018–19	NB I	0	0	1	0	—		—		1	0
Debrecen	2019–20	NB I	0	0	0	0	0	0	—		0	0
Debrecen	Total		0	0	0	0	0	0	—		0	0
DEAC (loan)	2020–21	NB II	23	1	1	0	—		—		24	1
Makó	2021–22	NB III	16	3	—		—		—		16	3
PMFC	2021–22	NB II	18	1	0	0	—		—		18	1
PMFC	2022–23	NB II	19	1	1	0	—		—		20	1
PMFC	Total		37	2	0	0	—		—		37	2
Kecskemét	2022–23	NB I	14	0	0	0	—		—		14	0
Kecskemét	2023–24	NB I	6	1	0	0	0	0	—		6	1
Kecskemét	2024–25	NB I	17	2	2	0	—		—		19	2
Kecskemét	Total		37	3	0	0	—		—		37	3
Valladolid	2024–25	La Liga	13	0	—		—		—		13	0
Valladolid	2025–26	Segunda División	1	0	0	0	—		—		1	0
Valladolid	Total		14	0	0	0	—		—		14	0
Rio Ave	2025–26	Primeira Liga	10	0	1	0	—		0	0	11	0
Career total			137	9	5	0	0	0	0	0	144	9

=== International ===
As of match played on 6 June 2025

Appearances and goals by national team and year
National team	Year	Apps	Goals
Hungary	2024	6	0
Hungary	2025	3	0
Total		9	0
