= Márió Zeke =

Hungarian footballer (born 2000)

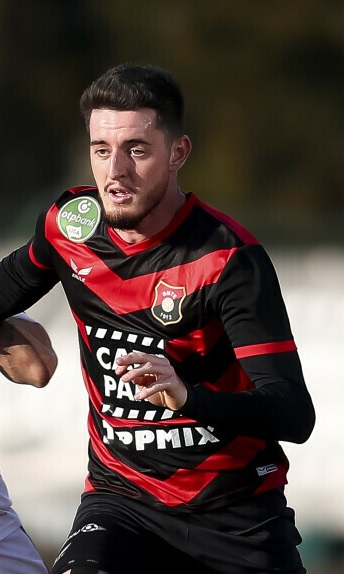
- Zeke playing for Budafok in 2021

Personal information
- Date of birth: 1 September 2000 (age 26)
- Place of birth: Sopron, Hungary
- Height: 1.82 m (6 ft 0 in)
- Position: Left-back

Team information
- Current team: Újpest

Youth career
- 2011–2013: Sopron
- 2013–2016: Győr

Senior career*
Years	Team	Apps	(Gls)
2016–2018	Győr	3	(0)
2018–2023	Fehérvár	4	(0)
2018–2023	→ Fehérvár II	34	(0)
2019–2020	→ Gyirmót (loan)	21	(1)
2020	→ Budaörs (loan)	15	(0)
2021	→ Budafok (loan)	13	(0)
2021–2022	→ Gyirmót (loan)	26	(0)
2022–2023	→ Kecskemét (loan)	28	(1)
2023–2025	Kecskemét	59	(4)
2025–2026	Paks	24	(1)
2026–	Újpest	0	(0)

International career^{‡}
2017	Hungary U-17	1	(0)
2018	Hungary U-19	2	(0)
- * Club domestic league appearances and goals as of 28 August 2026 ‡ National team caps and goals as of 12 December 2020

Márió Zeke (born 1 September 2000) is a Hungarian professional footballer who plays as a left-back for Nemzeti Bajnokság I club Újpest.

== Club career ==
Zeke joined Kecskemét on loan for the 2022–23 season.

=== Újpest ===
On 28 August 2026 Zeke signed with Nemzeti Bajnokság I club Újpest.

== Career statistics ==
As of 19 December 2022

Appearances and goals by club, season and competition
Club	Season	League			Cup		Continental		Other		Total	
Club	Season	Division	Apps	Goals	Apps	Goals	Apps	Goals	Apps	Goals	Apps	Goals
Győr	2016–17	Nemzeti Bajnokság III	1	0	2	0	—		—		3	0
Győr	2017–18	Nemzeti Bajnokság II	2	0	2	0	—		—		4	0
Győr	Total		3	0	4	0	0	0	0	0	7	0
Fehérvár II	2017–18	Nemzeti Bajnokság III	7	0	0	0	—		—		7	0
Fehérvár II	2018–19	Nemzeti Bajnokság III	25	0	0	0	—		—		25	0
Fehérvár II	2020–21	Nemzeti Bajnokság III	2	0	0	0	—		—		2	0
Fehérvár II	Total		34	0	0	0	0	0	0	0	34	0
Gyirmót	2019–20	Nemzeti Bajnokság II	21	1	1	0	—		—		22	1
Gyirmót	Total		21	1	1	0	0	0	0	0	22	1
Budaörs	2020–21	Nemzeti Bajnokság II	15	0	0	0	—		—		15	0
Budaörs	Total		15	0	0	0	0	0	0	0	15	0
Budafok	2020–21	Nemzeti Bajnokság I	13	0	1	0	—		—		14	0
Budafok	Total		13	0	1	0	0	0	0	0	14	0
Fehérvár	2020–21	Nemzeti Bajnokság I	1	0	2	0	0	0	—		3	0
Fehérvár	Total		1	0	2	0	0	0	0	0	3	0
Gyirmót	2021–22	Nemzeti Bajnokság I	26	0	0	0	0	0	—		3	0
Gyirmót	Total		26	0	1	0	0	0	0	0	27	0
Kecskeméti TE	2022–23	Nemzeti Bajnokság I	14	1	0	0	0	0	—		3	0
Kecskeméti TE	Total		14	1	0	0	0	0	0	0	14	1
Újpest	2026–27	Nemzeti Bajnokság I	0	0	0	0	—		—		0	0
Career total			127	2	9	0	0	0	0	0	136	2

== Honours ==
Kecskeméti TE

- Nemzeti Bajnokság I runner up: 2022–23
