= Csaba Belényesi =

Hungarian footballer

Personal information
- Date of birth: 3 March 1994 (age 32)
- Place of birth: Debrecen, Hungary
- Height: 1.93 m (6 ft 4 in)
- Position: Centre back

Team information
- Current team: Paks

Youth career
- 2003–2008: Debrecen
- 2008–2014: Puskás Akadémia
- 2013–2014: → Fehérvár

Senior career*
Years	Team	Apps	(Gls)
2014–2015	Gyula	6	(0)
2015	Cigánd	9	(3)
2015–2016	Putnok	27	(4)
2016–2019	Kazincbarcika	95	(12)
2019–2020	Debrecen	1	(0)
2019–2020	→ Debrecen II	14	(4)
2020–2021	DEAC	20	(2)
2021	Dorog	11	(1)
2021–2022	Kecskemét	19	(3)
2022	Diósgyőr	7	(0)
2022–	Kecskemét	124	(2)
2026–	→ Paks	0	(0)
- * Club domestic league appearances and goals as of 24 August 2026

Csaba Belényesi (born 3 March 1994) is a Hungarian football centre back who plays for Nemzeti Bajnokság II club Kecskemét on loan to Nemzeti Bajnokság I club Paks.

== Career ==
On 5 July 2022, Belényesi returned to Kecskemét.

== Career statistics ==
As of 17 June 2020.

Appearances and goals by club, season and competition
Club	Season	League			Cup		Continental		Other		Total	
Club	Season	Division	Apps	Goals	Apps	Goals	Apps	Goals	Apps	Goals	Apps	Goals
Gyula	2014–15	Nemzeti Bajnokság III	6	0	0	0	—		—		6	0
Cigánd	2014–15	Nemzeti Bajnokság III	9	3	0	0	—		—		9	3
Putnok	2015–16	Nemzeti Bajnokság III	27	4	1	0	—		—		28	4
Kazincbarcika	2016–17	Nemzeti Bajnokság III	32	7	0	0	—		—		32	7
Kazincbarcika	2017–18	Nemzeti Bajnokság II	33	3	1	0	—		—		34	3
Kazincbarcika	2018–19	Nemzeti Bajnokság II	30	2	1	0	—		—		31	2
Kazincbarcika	Total		95	12	2	0	0	0	0	0	97	12
Debrecen II	2019–20	Nemzeti Bajnokság III	14	4	—		—		—		14	4
Debrecen	2019–20	Nemzeti Bajnokság I	1	0	1	1	0	0	—		2	1
Career total			152	23	4	1	0	0	0	0	156	24
