= Krisztián Nagy (footballer, born 1995) =

Hungarian footballer

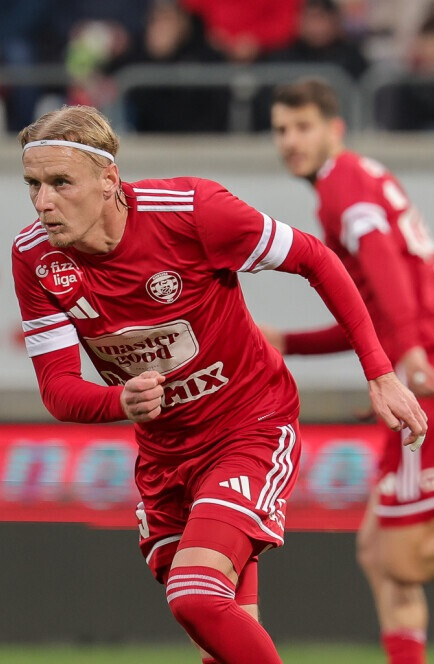
- Nagy playing for Kisvárda in 2025

Personal information
- Date of birth: 18 July 1995 (age 31)
- Place of birth: Kaposvár, Hungary
- Height: 1.87 m (6 ft 2 in)
- Position: Attacking midfielder

Team information
- Current team: Kisvárda
- Number: 55

Youth career
- 2006–2013: Kaposvár
- 2013: W. Regensburg

Senior career*
Years	Team	Apps	(Gls)
2013–2014	Nagyatád	13	(2)
2014–2020	Kaposvár	160	(49)
2020–2021	DEAC	32	(6)
2021–2025	Kecskemét	84	(8)
2025–	Kisvárda	23	(2)
- * Club domestic league appearances and goals as of 30 May 2026

Krisztián Nagy (born 18 July 1995) is a Hungarian professional footballer who plays for Nemzeti Bajnokság I club Kisvárda.

== Club career ==
In July 2021, Nagy signed with Kecskemét.

== Career statistics ==
Appearances and goals by club, season and competition
Club	Season	League			Cup		Europe		Total	
Club	Season	Division	Apps	Goals	Apps	Goals	Apps	Goals	Apps	Goals
Nagyatád	2013–14	Nemzeti Bajnokság III	13	2	1	0	—		14	2
Kaposvár
Kaposvár	2014–15	Nemzeti Bajnokság II	29	3	2	1	—		31	4
Kaposvár	2015–16	Megyei Bajnokság I	31	29	5	2	—		36	31
Kaposvár	2016–17	Nemzeti Bajnokság III	29	7	1	0	—		30	7
Kaposvár	2017–18	Nemzeti Bajnokság III	26	4	1	0	—		27	4
Kaposvár	2018–19	Nemzeti Bajnokság II	28	5	3	0	—		31	5
Kaposvár	2019–20	Nemzeti Bajnokság I	17	1	4	1	—		21	2
Kaposvár	Total		160	49	16	4	0	0	176	53
Career total			173	51	17	4	0	0	190	55

Updated to games played as of 14 March 2020.
