= Milán Májer =

Hungarian footballer (born 1999)

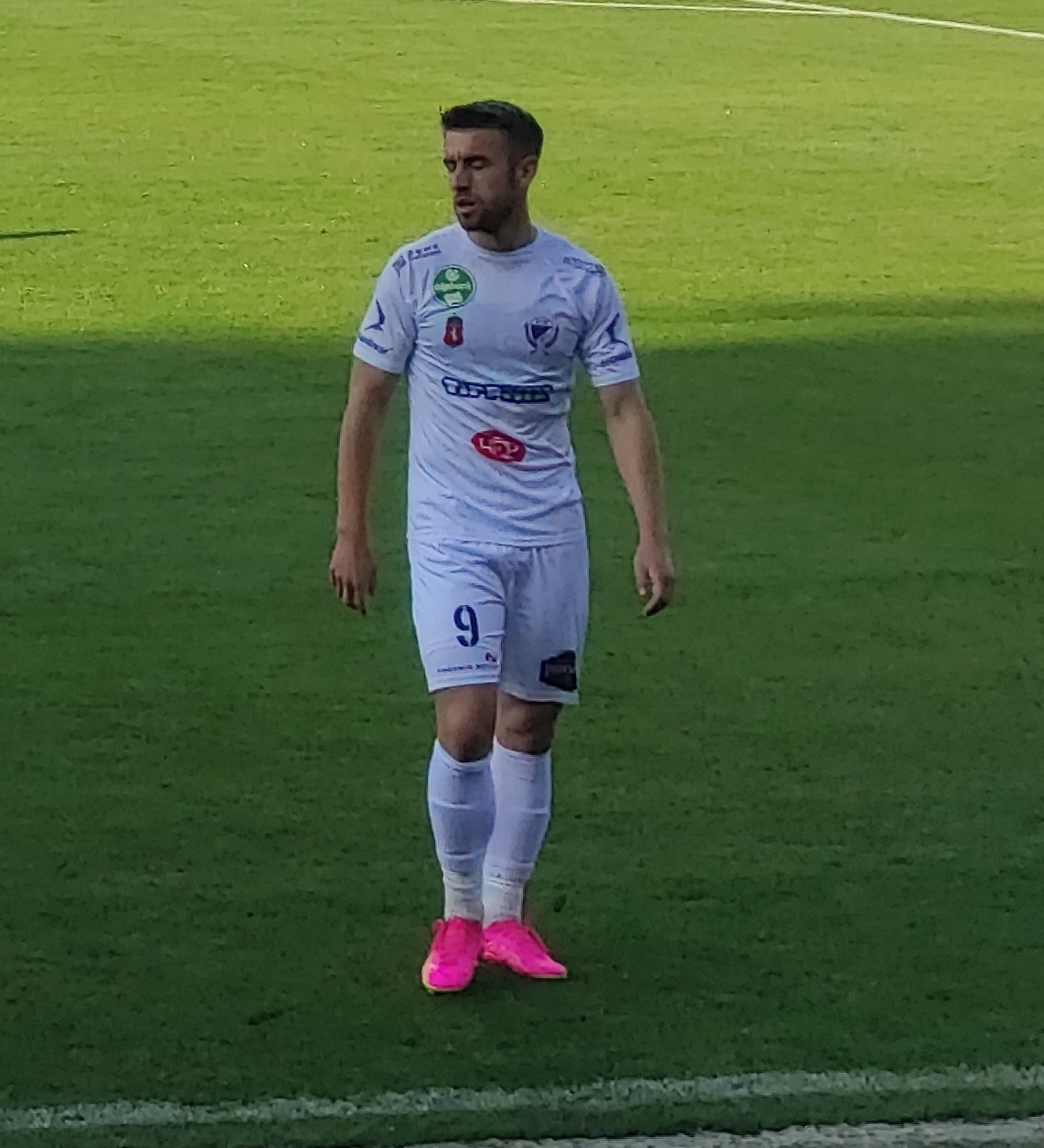
- Májer with Kecskemét in 2023

Personal information
- Date of birth: 28 June 1999 (age 27)
- Place of birth: Budapest, Hungary
- Height: 1.80 m (5 ft 11 in)
- Positions: Winger; defender

Team information
- Current team: Nyíregyháza
- Number: 11

Youth career
- 2012–2018: Budapest Honvéd

Senior career*
| Years | Team | Apps | (Gls) |
| 2018–2022 | Budapest Honvéd | 28 | (0) |
| 2018–2022 | → Budapest Honvéd II | 54 | (24) |
| 2019–2020 | → Gyirmót (loan) | 23 | (4) |
| 2020–2021 | → Győr (loan) | 38 | (6) |
| 2022–2023 | Zalaegerszeg | 8 | (0) |
| 2023–2025 | Kecskemét | 60 | (2) |
| 2025– | Nyíregyháza | 11 | (1) |

International career^{‡}
| 2018 | Hungary U-19 | 4 | (0) |
| 2019 | Hungary U-21 | 2 | (0) |
- * Club domestic league appearances and goals as of 30 May 2026 ‡ National team caps and goals as of 21:43, 5 January 2020 (UTC)

Milán Májer (born 28 June 1999) is a Hungarian professional footballer, who plays as a defender for Nemzeti Bajnokság I club Nyíregyháza.

== Career ==
=== Budapest Honvéd ===
On 31 March 2018, Májer played his first match for Budapest Honvéd in a 1–1 draw against Diósgyőr in the Hungarian League.

=== Zalaegerszeg ===
On 7 June 2022, Májer signed with Zalaegerszeg on a two-year contract with an optional third year.

=== Kecskemét ===
On 9 February 2023, Májer moved again and joined Kecskemét.

== Career statistics ==
Appearances and goals by club, season and competition
| Club | Season | League | | | Cup | | Europe | | Total | |
| Club | Season | Division | Apps | Goals | Apps | Goals | Apps | Goals | Apps | Goals |
|---|---|---|---|---|---|---|---|---|---|---|
| Budapest Honvéd II | 2017–18 | Nemzeti Bajnokság III | 14 | 3 | — | | — | | 14 | 3 |
| Budapest Honvéd II | 2018–19 | Nemzeti Bajnokság III | 23 | 13 | — | | — | | 23 | 13 |
| Budapest Honvéd II | 2019–20 | Nemzeti Bajnokság III | 1 | 0 | — | | — | | 1 | 0 |
| Budapest Honvéd II | 2021–22 | Nemzeti Bajnokság III | 16 | 8 | — | | — | | 16 | 8 |
| Budapest Honvéd II | Total | | 54 | 24 | 0 | 0 | 0 | 0 | 54 | 24 |
| Budapest Honvéd | 2017–18 | Nemzeti Bajnokság I | 8 | 0 | 0 | 0 | 0 | 0 | 8 | 0 |
| Budapest Honvéd | 2018–19 | Nemzeti Bajnokság I | 10 | 0 | 8 | 1 | 1 | 0 | 18 | 1 |
| Budapest Honvéd | 2021–22 | Nemzeti Bajnokság I | 8 | 0 | 1 | 0 | — | | 9 | 0 |
| Budapest Honvéd | Total | | 26 | 0 | 9 | 1 | 1 | 0 | 37 | 1 |
| Gyirmót (loan) | 2019–20 | Nemzeti Bajnokság II | 23 | 4 | 2 | 1 | — | | 25 | 5 |
| Győr (loan) | 2020–21 | Nemzeti Bajnokság II | 38 | 6 | 2 | 2 | — | | 40 | 8 |
| Career total | | | 139 | 34 | 13 | 4 | 1 | 0 | 156 | 38 |

Updated to games played as of 15 May 2022.
