= Alex Szabó (footballer, born 1998) =

Hungarian footballer

Personal information
- Date of birth: 26 August 1998 (age 28)
- Place of birth: Nagyatád, Hungary
- Height: 1.85 m (6 ft 1 in)
- Position: Centre-back

Team information
- Current team: FK Csíkszereda
- Number: 4

Youth career
- 2009–2012: Kárád
- 2012–2014: Dél-Balaton
- 2014–2017: Kaposvár

Senior career*
Years	Team	Apps	(Gls)
2017–2021	Kaposvár	70	(1)
2021–2026	Kecskemét	144	(7)
2026–	FK Csíkszereda	8	(0)
- * Club domestic league appearances and goals as of 21 September 2026

Alex Szabó (born 26 August 1998) is a Hungarian professional footballer who plays as a centre-back for Liga I club FK Csíkszereda.

== Club career ==
In July 2021 Szabó signed for Kecskemét, where he stayed until June 2026.

In June 2026 Szabó signed for FK Csíkszereda.

== Honours ==
Kaposvár

- Nemzeti Bajnokság III: 2017–18
