= Matheus Leoni =

Brazilian footballer (born 1991)

Personal information
- Full name: Matheus Izidorio Leoni
- Date of birth: 20 September 1991 (age 35)
- Place of birth: Porto Velho, Brazil
- Height: 1.80 m (5 ft 11 in)
- Position: Left back

Team information
- Current team: Komárno
- Number: 20

Senior career*
Years	Team	Apps	(Gls)
2013	Salgueiro	9	(0)
2014	Guarany de Sobral	3	(0)
2015	Vitória da Conquista	9	(0)
2015	Caxias	8	(1)
2016–2017	Neuchâtel Xamax	12	(0)
2017–2019	Beroe	58	(1)
2019–2020	Arda Kardzhali	30	(1)
2021–2023	Kisvárda	71	(6)
2023–2024	Kecskemét	23	(0)
2024–2025	Nyíregyháza	6	(0)
2025–2026	Dobrudzha	26	(1)
2026–	Komárno	4	(0)
- * Club domestic league appearances and goals as of 26 July 2026

Matheus Izidorio Leoni (born 20 September 1991) is a Brazilian professional footballer who plays as a left-back for Slovak club Komárno.
