= 2025–26 Nyíregyháza Spartacus FC season =

Nyíregyháza
2025–26 season
- Manager: Tamás Bódog (From 29 October 2025); István Szabó (From 8 April 2025 until 28 October 2025)
- Stadium: Városi Stadion
- Nemzeti Bajnokság I: 9th
- Magyar Kupa: Round of 64
- Top goalscorer: League: Tijani (7); All: Tijani (7)
- Highest home attendance: 8,013 (v Ferencváros, Nemzeti Bajnokság, R25, 8 March 2026)
- Lowest home attendance: 3,750 (v Újpest, Nemzeti Bajnokság, R19, 24 January 2026)
- Average home league attendance: 5,498
- Biggest win: 4 goals, (4–0) v Kazincbarcika (A), Nemzeti Bajnokság, R22, 15 February 2026
- Biggest defeat: 5 goals, (2–7) v Újpest (A), Nemzeti Bajnokság, R30, 17 April 2026
- All statistics correct as of 15 May 2026.

The 2025–26 season is Nyíregyháza Spartacus FC's 15th competitive season, 2nd consecutive season in the Nemzeti Bajnokság I and 97th year in existence as a football club. In addition to the domestic league, Nyíregyháza participate in this season's editions of the Magyar Kupa.

Nyíregyháza Spartacus was eliminated from the Magyar Kupa (Hungarian Cup) in the first match of this season after losing 4–2 on penalties to second division team Békéscsaba after a 0–0 draw.

== Kits ==
Supplier: Macron / Sponsor: Tippmix

| Home | Home alt. | Away | Away alt. |

| Goalkeeper^{1} | Goalkeeper^{2} |

== First team squad ==
As of 12 February 2026

Note: Flags indicate national team as defined under FIFA eligibility rules; some limited exceptions apply. Players may hold more than one non-FIFA nationality.

| No. | Pos. | Nation | Player |
|---|---|---|---|
| 1 | GK | HUN | Balázs Bese |
| 4 | DF | HUN | Áron Alaxai |
| 6 | MF | UKR | Yuriy Toma |
| 7 | DF | SRB | Nemanja Antonov |
| 9 | FW | AUT | Marko Kvasina |
| 10 | MF | HUN | Balázs Manner |
| 11 | MF | HUN | Milán Májer |
| 12 | MF | HUN | Milán Kovács |
| 14 | FW | HUN | Dominik Nagy (captain) |
| 15 | DF | HUN | Attila Temesvári |
| 17 | FW | HUN | Benjámin Oláh |
| 18 | MF | CRO | Bojan Sanković |
| 20 | FW | MKD | Dorian Babunski |
| 21 | GK | HUN | Mátyás Molnár |
| 21 | MF | HUN | Zsombor Vukk |
| 23 | FW | HUN | Márk Kovácsréti |

| No. | Pos. | Nation | Player |
|---|---|---|---|
| 24 | DF | MKD | Vane Jovanov |
| 26 | FW | NGR | Muhamed Tijani (on loan from (Czech Republic) Slavia Prague) |
| 31 | DF | HUN | Levente Katona |
| 32 | GK | HUN | Balázs Tóth |
| 33 | DF | ALB | Eneo Bitri |
| 34 | FW | NGR | Bright Edomwonyi |
| 44 | DF | CYP | Pavlos Korrea |
| 45 | FW | SRB | Slobodan Babić |
| 46 | GK | HUN | Roland Kersák |
| 55 | MF | HUN | Bálint Katona |
| 63 | GK | HUN | Dániel Kovács |
| 70 | MF | HUN | Mátyás Katona |
| 77 | DF | HUN | Barna Benczenleitner |
| 88 | DF | HUN | Bendegúz Farkas (on loan from (Hungary) Puskás Akadémia) |
| 98 | DF | MNE | Meldin Drešković |
| — | GK | HUN | Martin Dala (on loan from (Hungary) Puskás Akadémia) |

== Transfers ==
=== Summer ===
In
| Date | No. | Pos. | Nat. | Player | Moving from | Fee | Ref. |
|---|---|---|---|---|---|---|---|
| 10 June 2025 | 18 | MF | Croatia | Bojan Sanković | Zalaegerszeg | Free | |
| 16 June 2025 | 11 | MF | Hungary | Milán Májer | Kecskemét (NB II) | Undisclosed | |
| 23 June 2025 | 34 | FW | Nigeria | Bright Edomwonyi | Diósgyőr | Undisclosed | |
| 30 June 2025 | 7 | DF | Serbia | Nemanja Antonov | MTK | Free | |
| 2 July 2025 | 70 | MF | Hungary | Mátyás Katona | Videoton (NB II) | Undisclosed | |
| 2 July 2025 | 10 | MF | Hungary | Balázs Manner | Ferencváros | Undisclosed | |
| 4 July 2025 | 20 | FW | North Macedonia | Dorian Babunski | Sepsi | Undisclosed | |
| 14 July 2025 | 63 | GK | Hungary | Dániel Kovács | Volos | Undisclosed | |
| 12 August 2025 | 31 | DF | Hungary | Levente Katona | Kecskemét (NB II) | Undisclosed | |
| 14 August 2025 | 55 | MF | Hungary | Bálint Katona | Ferencváros | Undisclosed | |
| 15 August 2025 | 21 | FW | Hungary | Kevin Varga | Ankaragücü | Undisclosed | |
| 2 September 2025 | 33 | DF | Albania | Eneo Bitri | Győri ETO | Undisclosed | |
| 4 September 2025 | 8 | MF | Trinidad and Tobago | Dantaye Gilbert | Jong PSV | Undisclosed | |

Loaned from
| Date | No. | Pos. | Nat. | Player | Moving from | Until | Ref. |
|---|---|---|---|---|---|---|---|
| 19 July 2025 | 88 | DF | Hungary | Bendegúz Farkas | Puskás Akadémia | 30 June 2026 | |

Out
| Date | No. | Pos. | Nat. | Player | Moving to | Fee | Ref. |
|---|---|---|---|---|---|---|---|
| 3 June 2025 | | MF | Georgia (country) | Nika Kvekveskiri | TBD | Contracts expire | |
| 3 June 2025 | | DF | North Macedonia | Darko Velkovski | TBD | Contracts expire | |
| 3 June 2025 | | DF | Hungary | Krisztián Géresi | — | Retired | |
| 11 June 2025 | 77 | DF | Hungary | Barnabás Nagy | Ferencváros | Undisclosed | |
| 1 July 2025 | 92 | FW | Hungary | Barnabás Németh | Vasas (NB II) | After loan permanently | |
| 1 July 2025 | 74 | FW | Hungary | Patrik Pinte | Budapest Honvéd (NB II) | After loan permanently | |
| 1 July 2025 | 17 | MF | Hungary | Kevin Horváth | Soroksár (NB II) | Undisclosed | |
| 1 July 2025 | 10 | MF | Romania | Ronaldo Deaconu | TBD | Contract expire | |
| 10 July 2025 | 95 | GK | Romania | Béla Fejér | TBD | Mutual agreement | |
| 10 July 2025 | 7 | FW | Czech Republic | Jaroslav Navrátil | TBD | Mutual agreement | |
| 23 July 2025 | 27 | FW | Hungary | Márton Eppel | Csíkszereda | Undisclosed | |
| 3 September 2025 | 8 | MF | Ivory Coast | Aboubakar Keita | Diósgyőr | Undisclosed | |

Out on loan
| Date | No. | Pos. | Nat. | Player | Moving to | Loan date | Ref. |
|---|---|---|---|---|---|---|---|
| 15 July 2025 | 24 | DF | Hungary | Krisztián Keresztes | Dundee United | 30 June 2026 | |
| 18 July 2025 | 33 | DF | Hungary | Olivér Tamás | BVSC (NB II) | 30 June 2026 | |
| 30 July 2025 | 30 | FW | The Gambia | Lamin Marong | Šamorín (2. Liga (Slovakia)) | 30 June 2026 | |
| 2 August 2025 | | FW | Hungary | Zsombor Vukk | Tiszakécske (NB II) | 30 June 2026 | |
| 2 August 2025 | | DF | Hungary | Zsombor Csörnyei | Ajka (NB II) | 30 June 2026 | |
| 2 August 2025 | | MF | Hungary | Ákos Kun | Szeged (NB II) | 30 June 2026 | |
| 2 August 2025 | | FW | Hungary | Róbert Tarcsi | Karcag (NB II) | 30 June 2026 | |
| 2 September 2025 | | FW | Slovenia | Žan Medved | Slovácko (Czech First League) | 30 June 2026 | |

=== Contract extension ===
| Date | No. | Pos. | Nat. | Player | Extension to | Ref. |
|---|---|---|---|---|---|---|
| 27 June 2025 | 14 | FW | Hungary | Dominik Nagy | 30 June 2026 | |

=== New contract ===
| Date | No. | Pos. | Nat. | Player | From | Until | Ref. |
|---|---|---|---|---|---|---|---|
| 18 July 2025 | 19 | FW | Hungary | Ádám Czimer-Nyitrai | Nyíregyháza Academy | Undisclosed | |
| 18 July 2025 | TBD | FW | Hungary | Róbert Tarcsi | Győri ETO | Undisclosed | |

=== Managerial changes ===
| Outgoing manager | Manner of departure | Date of vacancy | Position in table | Incoming manager | Date of appointment | Ref. |
|---|---|---|---|---|---|---|
| (Hungary) István Szabó | Sacked | 28 October 2025 | 12th | (Hungary) Tamás Bódog | 29 October 2025 | |

^{c} = Caretaker

== Friendlies ==
Win Draw Loss Fixtures

=== Pre-season ===
| 28 June 2025 Friendly | Nyíregyháza | 4–2 | Cigánd (NB III) | Nyíregyháza |
| 11:00 CEST (UTC+02:00) | Keresztes 11'; Beke 53' 90'; Eppel 88' (pen.) | Report | Horváth 21'; Juhász 34' | Stadium: Városi Stadion; Attendance: 1,000 |
Note: • Nyíregyháza 1st half: Kis — Korrea, Keresztes, O. Tamás, Korodi, Vukk, Tarcsi, Melich, Czimer-Nyitrai, Edomwonyi, Oláh • Nyíregyháza 2nd half: Bese — Temesvári, Alaxai, Jokić, Májer, Keita, Toma, Benczenleitner, D. Nagy, Beke, Eppel • Manager: István Szabó

Summer Training Camp in Slovenia from 29 June until 5 July 2025.

| 2 July 2025 Friendly | Bohemians Praha (Czech I) (Czech Republic) | 5–0 | Nyíregyháza | Gorišnica, Slovenia |
| 11:00 CEST (UTC+02:00) | Yusuf 8', 35'; Drchal 45'; Ristovski 58'; Černý 79' | Report |
Note: • Nyíregyháza: Bese — Alaxai, Korrea, Jokić, Májer, Toma, Keita, D. Nagy, Benczenleitner, Eppel (Edomwonyi (substituted on) 46'), Beke • Manager: István Szabó

| 2 July 2025 Friendly | Rudar Velenje (Slovenian II) (Slovenia) | 2–3 | Nyíregyháza | Gorišnica, Slovenia |
| 18:00 CEST (UTC+02:00) | Okocha 24'; 90' | Report | Czimer-Nyitrai 13'; Tarcsi 61'; M. Kovács 66' |
Note: • Nyíregyháza: Fejér — O. Tamás, Keresztes, Temesvári, Czimer-Nyitrai, M. Kovács, Manner, Antonov, M. Katona, Oláh (Vukk (substituted on) 60'), Tarcsi • Manager: István Szabó

| 5 July 2025 Friendly | Lokomotiva Zagreb (Croatian I) (Croatia) | 1–1 | Nyíregyháza | Gorišnica, Slovenia |
| 18:00 CEST (UTC+02:00) | Gorican 31' | Report | D. Babunski 65' |
Note: • Nyíregyháza: B. Tóth (Bese (substituted on) 63') — Alaxai, Korrea (Keresztes (substituted on) 63'), Jokić (Temesvári (substituted on) 63'), Májer (Czimer-Nyitrai (substituted on) 74'), M. Kovács (M. Katona (substituted on) 46'), Toma (O. Tamás (substituted on) 83'), D. Nagy (Manner (substituted on) 63'), Benczenleitner (Antonov (substituted on) 46'), Beke (Tarcsi (substituted on) 63'), Edomwonyi (D. Babunski (substituted on) 46') • Manager: István Szabó

| 9 July 2025 Friendly | DEAC (NB III) | 3–0 | Nyíregyháza | Debrecen |
| 11:00 CEST (UTC+02:00) | | Report | Tarcsi 17'; Antonov 46'; Oláh 74' | Stadium: DEAC Stadion |
Note: • Nyíregyháza: M. Molnár (Bese (substituted on) 60') — Temesvári, Evangelou, Keresztes (Vukk (substituted on) 66'), Czimer-Nyitrai (Kovácsréti (substituted on) 66'), O. Tamás, Keita, Manner, Antonov, Tarcsi (Oláh (substituted on) 66'), D. Babunski • Manager: István Szabó

| 9 July 2025 Friendly | Nyíregyháza | 3–0 | Karcag (NB III) | Nyíregyháza |
| 17:30 CEST (UTC+02:00) | Sághy 37' (o.g.); Beke 46'; Edomwonyi 60' | Report | | Stadium: Városi Stadion |
Note: • Nyíregyháza: B. Tóth (M. Molnár (substituted on) 84') — Májer, Alaxai, Korrea, Jokić, Benczenleitner, M. Katona, Toma (M. Kovács (substituted on) 67'), D. Nagy, Edomwonyi, Beke • Manager: István Szabó

| 12 July 2025 Friendly | Vasas (NB II) | 2–2 | Nyíregyháza | Budapest |
| 13:00 CEST (UTC+02:00) | Urblík 14' (pen.); Kapornai 25' | Report | Tarcsi 77'; D. Babunski 78' | Stadium: Illovszky Rudolf Stadion, Training Center |
Note: 2x60 minutes playing time • Nyíregyháza 1st half: Bese — Alaxai, Korrea, Jokić, Májer, Toma, M. Katona, Benczenleitner, D. Nagy, Edomwonyi, Beke • Nyíregyháza 2nd half: Bese (M. Molnár (substituted on) 91') — Temesvári, Korrea (Kovácsréti (substituted on) 93'), Evangelou, Májer (Czimer-Nyitrai (substituted on) 100'), M. Kovács, Keita, Manner, Antonov, Edomwonyi (Tarcsi (substituted on) 74'), D. Babunski • Manager: István Szabó

| 19 July 2025 Friendly | Nyíregyháza | 1–0 | Mezőkövesd (NB II) | Nyíregyháza |
| | D. Nagy 5' (pen.) | Report | | Stadium: Városi Stadion; Attendance: 0 (Closed doors) |
Note: • Nyíregyháza: Kersák (D. Kovács (substituted on) 46') — Korrea (Temesvári (substituted on) 46'), Alaxai (Jokić (substituted on) 46'), Evangelou, Májer (Farkas (substituted on) 60') D. Nagy (Manner (substituted on) 46'), Toma (Keita (substituted on) 46'), M. Katona (M. Kovács (substituted on) 46'), Benczenleitner (Antonov (substituted on) 46'), Edomwonyi (Czimer-Nyitrai (substituted on) 60'), Beke (D. Babunski (substituted on) 46') • Manager: István Szabó

=== Mid-season ===
| 5 September 2025 Friendly | Nyíregyháza | 6–0 | (Romania) Satu Mare (Romanian I) | Nyíregyháza |
| 13:00 CEST | Evangelou 23'; Kovácsréti 30'; Manner 39'; Edomwonyi 44'; Gilbert 47'; Oláh 87' | Report | | Stadium: Városi Stadion; Attendance: 0 (Closed doors) |
Note: • Nyíregyháza: D. Kovács — Májer, Evangelou, L. Katona, Antonov, Benczenleitner, M. Katona, Kovácsréti, B. Katona, Manner, Edomwonyi • Substitutions: Kersák (GK), Czimer-Nyitrai, Oláh, Babunski, Jokić, Gilbert, Korrea • Manager: István Szabó

| 13 November 2025 Friendly | Nyíregyháza | 4–1 | Karcag (NB II) | Nyíregyháza |
| 13:00 CET | Gilbert 6', 58'; Babunski 48'; Manner 53' | Report | Székely 102' | Stadium: Városi Stadion |
Note: 2x60 minutes playing time • Nyíregyháza: Bese (Kersák (substituted on) 44' (substituted off) 80' (M. Molnár (substituted on) 80')) — Alaxai (Jokić (substituted on) 90'), L. Katona (Korrea (substituted on) 46'), Bitri (Temesvári (substituted on) 46'), Benczenleitner (Antonov (substituted on) 90'), Toma (B. Katona (substituted on) 90'), M. Kovács (Sanković (substituted on) 90'), Manner (Czimer-Nyitrai (substituted on) 90'), Kovácsréti (Oláh (substituted on) 46'), Gilbert (Ke. Varga (substituted on) 46'), Babunski (Bocskai (substituted on) 90') • Manager: Bódog

Winter training camp in Belek, Turkey, from 6 January 2026.

| 7 January 2026 Friendly | Csíkszereda (Romanian I) (Romanian Football Federation) | 0–0 | Nyíregyháza | Belek, Turkey |
| 15:00 (13:00 CET) | Brugger (yellow card) 64' | Report | M. Kovács (yellow card) 32' | Stadium: Bellis Football Complex |
Note: • Nyíregyháza: Bese — B. Farkas (Huszti (substituted on) 60'), Temesvári (Alaxai (substituted on) 60'), L. Katona (Korrea (substituted on) 60'), Benczenleitner, Vukk, M. Kovács (Toma (substituted on) 60'), B. Katona (Sanković (substituted on) 60'), D. Nagy (M. Katona (substituted on) 60'), Oláh, Babunski (Gilbert (substituted on) 60') • Manager: Bódog

| 10 January 2026 Friendly | Karviná (Czech I) (Football Association of the Czech Republic) | 5–1 | Nyíregyháza | Belek, Turkey |
| 13:30 | Ezeh 1'; Singhateh 15'; Condé 70'; Vinicius 89'; Furaha 90' | | M. Katona 56' | Stadium: Bellis Football Complex |
Note: • Nyíregyháza 1st half: Bese — Huszti, Alaxai, Korrea, Antonov, Manner, Sanković, Toma, Kovácsréti, Edomwonyi, Gilbert • Nyíregyháza 2nd half: D. Kovács — Vukk, Temesvári, L. Katona, Benczenleitner, M. Katona, M. Kovács, B. Katona, D. Nagy, Oláh, Babunski • Manager: Bódog

| 13 January 2026 Friendly | Levski Sofia (Bulgarian I) (Bulgarian Football Union) | 0–0 | Nyíregyháza | Belek, Turkey |
| 13:00 | | Report | | Stadium: Bellis Football Complex |
Note: • Nyíregyháza: D. Kovács — Drešković, Temesvári, L. Katona (Alaxai (substituted on) 74'), Benczenleitner (Antonov (substituted on) 66') — Manner (Kovácsréti (substituted on) 66'), M. Kovács, B. Katona (Toma (substituted on) 66'), D. Nagy (Sanković (substituted on) 66') — Babunski (M. Katona (substituted on) 66'), Edomwonyi (Oláh (substituted on) 55') • Manager: Bódog

| 16 January 2026 Friendly | Hradec Králové (Czech I) (Football Association of the Czech Republic) | 4–0 | Nyíregyháza |
| 13:00 | Darida 25' (pen.); Hodek 50'; Zentrich 65'; Vlkanova 68' | Report |
Note: • Nyíregyháza: D. Kovács — Drešković (B. Farkas (substituted on) 65'), Temesvári (Alaxai (substituted on) 85'), L. Katona (Korrea (substituted on) 85'), Benczenleitner (Antonov (substituted on) 65') — M. Kovács, B. Katona (Sanković (substituted on) 76'), Manner (Toma (substituted on) 65'), D. Nagy (Vukk (substituted on) 76') — Babunski, Kvasina (Oláh (substituted on) 76') • Manager: Bódog

== Competitions ==
=== Overall record ===
In italics, we indicate the Last match and the Final position achieved in competition(s) that have not yet been completed.

| Competition | First match | Last match | Starting round | Final position | Record | | | | | | | |
| Competition | First match | Last match | Starting round | Final position | Pld | W | D | L | GF | GA | GD | Win % |
|---|---|---|---|---|---|---|---|---|---|---|---|---|
| Nemzeti Bajnokság I | 27 July 2025 | 15 May 2026 | Matchday 1 | 9th | 33 | 10 | 10 | 13 | 47 | 57 | −10 | 30.30 |
| Magyar Kupa | 13 September 2025 | 13 September 2025 | Round of 64 | Round of 64 | 1 | 0 | 1 | 0 | 0 | 0 | +0 | 0.00 |
| Total | | | | | 34 | 10 | 11 | 13 | 47 | 57 | −10 | 29.41 |

Last updated: 15 May 2026
Source: Soccerway

=== Nemzeti Bajnokság I ===
==== League table ====
| Pos | Team | Pld | W | D | L | GF | GA | GD | Pts | Qualification or relegation |
|---|---|---|---|---|---|---|---|---|---|---|
| 7 | Újpest | 33 | 11 | 7 | 15 | 48 | 57 | −9 | 40 | |
| 8 | Kisvárda | 33 | 11 | 7 | 15 | 36 | 49 | −13 | 40 | |
| 9 | Nyíregyháza | 33 | 10 | 10 | 13 | 47 | 57 | −10 | 40 | |
| 10 | MTK | 33 | 9 | 11 | 13 | 55 | 62 | −7 | 38 | |
| 11 | Diósgyőr (R) | 33 | 6 | 10 | 17 | 39 | 65 | −26 | 28 | Relegation to the Nemzeti Bajnokság II |

Source: Hungarian Football Federation (in Hungarian)
Rules for classification: 1) Points; 2) Matches won; 3) Goal difference; 4) Goals scored; 5) Head-to-head points; 6) Head-to-head goal difference; 7) Fair play ranking; 8) Drawing of lots.
(R) Relegated

==== Results summary ====
| Overall | | | | | | | | Home | | | | | | Away | | | | | |
| Pld | W | D | L | GF | GA | GD | Pts | W | D | L | GF | GA | GD | W | D | L | GF | GA | GD |
|---|---|---|---|---|---|---|---|---|---|---|---|---|---|---|---|---|---|---|---|
| 33 | 10 | 10 | 13 | 47 | 57 | −10 | 40 | 5 | 6 | 6 | 25 | 29 | −4 | 5 | 4 | 7 | 22 | 28 | −6 |

Last updated: 15 May 2026.
Source: Soccerway

==== Results by round ====
A = Away; H = Home; W = Win; D = Draw; L = Loss

| Round | 1 | 2 | 3 | 4 | 5 | 6 | 7 | 8 | 9 | 10 | 11 | 12 | 13 | 14 | 15 | 16 | 17 | 18 | 19 | 20 | 21 | 22 | 23 | 24 | 25 | 26 | 27 | 28 | 29 | 30 | 31 | 32 | 33 |
|---|---|---|---|---|---|---|---|---|---|---|---|---|---|---|---|---|---|---|---|---|---|---|---|---|---|---|---|---|---|---|---|---|---|
| Ground | H | A | H | A | H | A | H | A | H | A | H | A | H | A | H | A | H | A | H | A | H | A | H | A | H | A | H | A | H | A | H | A | H |
| Result | D | L | L | W | L | L | D | D | W | L | L | D | D | W | L | L | L | L | D | W | W | W | D | W | L | D | W | L | W | L | W | D | D |
| Position | 10 | 8 | 10 | 9 | 10 | 10 | 10 | 11 | 9 | 9 | 12 | 12 | 11 | 11 | 11 | 11 | 11 | 11 | 11 | 11 | 10 | 10 | 10 | 9 | 9 | 9 | 9 | 9 | 9 | 10 | 9 | 9 | 9 |
| Points | 1 | 1 | 1 | 4 | 4 | 4 | 5 | 6 | 9 | 9 | 9 | 10 | 11 | 14 | 14 | 14 | 14 | 14 | 15 | 18 | 21 | 24 | 25 | 28 | 28 | 29 | 32 | 32 | 35 | 35 | 38 | 39 | 40 |
| Manager | S | S | S | S | S | S | S | S | S | S | S | B | B | B | B | B | B | B | B | B | B | B | B | B | B | B | B | B | B | B | B | B | B |

Updated to match(es) played on 15 May 2026. Source:
Notes:
Manager: • S István Szabó • B Tamás Bódog

==== Matches ====
Win Draw Loss Fixtures Postponed

The draw for the 2025/26 season was held on 16 June 2025.

| 27 July 2025 1 | Nyíregyháza | 1–1 | Kisvárda | Nyíregyháza |
| 16:00 CEST | Alaxai (yellow card) 76'; Májer (yellow card) 84'; D. Nagy (yellow card) 90+1'; Kovácsréti 90+3' (pen.) | Report | Matić 8' (yellow card) 38'; Melnyk (yellow card) 91' | Stadium: Városi Stadion; Attendance: 6,834; Referee: Balázs Berke; Assistant referees: Péter Garai, Dávid Rózsa |
Note: • Nyíregyháza: Kersák — Alaxai, Evangelou, Korrea — Májer, Toma (Manner (substituted on) 84'), D. Nagy (c) Benczenleitner (Antonov (substituted on) 64') — M. Katona (A. Keita (substituted on) 64'), Beke (Do. Babunski (substituted on) 64') — Edomwonyi (Kovácsréti (substituted on) 76') • Manager: Szabó; Player of the match: Bernardo Matić, Kisvárda 8.4 • Best player of Nyíregyháza: Aboubakar Keita 7.2

| 3 August 2025 2 | Puskás Akadémia | 3–2 | Nyíregyháza | Felcsút |
| 17:45 | Lukács 26'; Vékony (yellow card) 41'; Zs. Nagy (yellow card) 43'; Golla (yellow card) 47'; Favorov (yellow card) 52'; P. Dárdai 84'; Fameyeh 86' | Report | Benczenleitner 2'; Evangelou 44'; Alaxai (yellow card) 56'; D. Nagy (yellow card) 75'; Korrea (yellow card) 89' (yellow-red card) 90' | Stadium: Pancho Aréna; Attendance: 1,526; Referee: Márton Rúsz; Assistant referees: Vencel Tóth II, Péter Kóbor |
Note: • Nyíregyháza: Kersák — Temesvári (Korrea (substituted on) 71'), Alaxai, Evangelou — Májer, Toma, A. Keita, D. Nagy (c) (Beke (substituted on) 84'), Benczenleitner (Antonov (substituted on) 66') — Do. Babunski (Edomwonyi (substituted on) 66'), M. Katona (Kovácsréti (substituted on) 71') • Manager: Szabó • Player of the match: Barna Benczenleitner, Nyíregyháza 7.9 • Best player of Puskás Akadémia: Joel Fameyeh 7.6

| 9 August 2025 3 | Nyíregyháza | 1–4 | Ferencváros | Nyíregyháza |
| 20:15 CEST | Temesvári (yellow card) 17'; Jokić (yellow card) 61'; Edomwonyi 66' (pen.) (yellow card) 73' | Report | Gruber 12', 74' (pen.); B. Varga 22'; Levi 33' (yellow card) 39'; Botka (yellow card) 45+3'; Cissé (yellow card) 61'; N. Keïta (yellow card) 81' | Stadium: Városi Stadion; Attendance: 7,980; Referee: Bence Csonka dr. Assistant referees: Gergő Vígh-Tarsonyi, Gergely Becséri |
Note: • Nyíregyháza: Kersák — Jokić, Temesvári, Evangelou, Benczenleitner (Farkas (substituted on) 75') — Májer (Antonov (substituted on) 75'), A. Keita, M. Katona, Manner (Kovácsréti (substituted on) 72'), D. Nagy (c) (Toma (substituted on) 46') — Do. Babunski (Edomwonyi (substituted on) 46') • Manager: Szabó • Player of the match: Zsombor Gruber, Ferencváros 8.8 • Best player of Nyíregyháza: Mátyás Katona 7.3

| 17 August 2025 4 | Debrecen | 1–2 | Nyíregyháza | Debrecen |
| 15:30 CEST | T. Szűcs 16' (yellow card) 90+2'; Gordić (yellow card) 43'; Batik (yellow card) 81'; Djokic (yellow card) 89' | Report | Jokić (yellow card) 33'; Edomwonyi 47'; Evangelou (yellow card) 81' (goal) 90'; Alaxai (yellow card) 82' | Stadium: Nagyerdei Stadion; Attendance: 12,626; Referee: Tamár Bognár; Assistant referees: Vencel Tóth II, Péter Kóbor |
Note: • Nyíregyháza: D. Kovács — Temesvári, Evangelou (c), Jokić (L. Katona (substituted on) 46') — Májer, M. Katona, Sanković (Alaxai (substituted on) 80'), Antonov — Do. Babunski (Beke (substituted on) 66'), Edomwonyi (A. Keita (substituted on) 72'), Kovácsréti (B. Katona (substituted on) 66') • Manager: Szabó • Player of the match: Tamás Szűcs, Debrecen 8.3 • Best player of Nyíregyháza: Aboubakar Keita 7.8

| 23 August 2025 5 | Nyíregyháza | 1–4 | Diósgyőr | Nyíregyháza |
| 20:15 CEST | Edomwonyi 58'; Evangelou (yellow card) 86'; L. Katona (yellow card) 90' | Report | Vallejo 35'; Acolatse 65' (pen.) (penalty missed) 78'; Babos 82', 88'; D. Gera (yellow card) 87' | Stadium: Városi Stadion; Attendance: 7,083; Referee: Balázs Berke; Assistant referees: István Albert, Balázs Szalai |
Note: • Nyíregyháza: D. Kovács — L. Katona, Farkas (Májer (substituted on) 46'), Temesvári (Alaxai (substituted on) 43'), Evangelou (c), Antonov — M. Katona (B. Katona (substituted on) 67'), Toma (Do. Babunski (substituted on) 67'), Sanković (A. Keita (substituted on) 80') — Edomwonyi, Kovácsréti • Manager: Szabó • Player of the match: Bence Babos, Diósgyőr 8.6 • Best player of Nyíregyháza: Bright Edomwonyi 7.8

| 31 August 2025 6 | Győri ETO | 1–0 | Nyíregyháza | Győr |
| 17:30 CEST | Abrahamsson (yellow card) 55'; Benbouali 85' | Report | Májer (yellow card) 83'; Farkas (yellow card) 90+2' | Stadium: ETO Park; Attendance: 3,340; Referee: Gergő Bogár; Assistant referees: Dániel Szalai, Dávid Rózsa |
Note: • Nyíregyháza: D. Kovács — Farkas, Evangelou (c), L. Katona — Májer, M. Katona (Kovácsréti (substituted on) 74'), Sanković, Manner (Toma (substituted on) 64'), Benczenleitner — Edomwonyi, Do. Babunski (B. Katona (substituted on) 64') • Manager: Szabó • Player of the match: Paul Anton, Győri ETO 8.6 • Best player of Nyíregyháza: Levente Katona 6.9

| 20 September 2025 7 | Nyíregyháza | 1–1 | Paks | Nyíregyháza |
| 16:00 CEST | Manner (yellow card) 26'; Evangelou (yellow card) 66'; Edomwonyi 86' | Report | Hahn 46'; Papp (yellow card) 90+4' | Stadium: Városi Stadion; Attendance: 4,535; Referee: Imre Kovács; Assistant referees: Zoltán Horváth, Dániel Szalai |
Note: • Nyíregyháza: D. Kovács — Korrea, Evangelou (c), L. Katona — Farkas (Májer (substituted on) 63'), M. Kovács (Do. Babunski (substituted on) 76'), Sanković, Benczenleitner (Antonov (substituted on) 76') — Manner (M. Katona (substituted on) 46' (substituted off) 63' (Toma (substituted on) 63')), Edomwonyi, B. Katona • Manager: Szabó • Player of the match: Bright Edomwonyi, Nyíregyháza 8.2 • Best player of Paks: Ádám Kovácsik 7.8

| 26 September 2025 8 | Újpest | 2–2 | Nyíregyháza | Budapest |
| 20:00 CEST | Matko 17', 24'; João Nunes (yellow card) 56'; Fiola (yellow card) 64' | Report | L. Katona (yellow card) 9'; Do. Babunski 12'; Antonov (yellow card) 35'; Májer 42'; Evangelou (yellow card) 64'; Edomwonyi (yellow card) 69'; Toma (yellow card) 73'; B. Katona (yellow card) 90' | Stadium: Szusza Ferenc Stadion; Attendance: 4,430; Referee: Márton Rúsz; Assistant referees: Gergő Vígh-Tarsonyi, Bence Belicza |
Note: • Nyíregyháza: D. Kovács — Májer (Ke. Varga (substituted on) 77'), Korrea (Farkas (substituted on) 46'), Evangelou (c), L. Katona, Antonov (Benczenleitner (substituted on) 46') — B. Katona, Sanković, M. Katona (Toma (substituted on) 71') — Edomwonyi, Do. Babunski (Kovácsréti (substituted on) 85') • Manager: Szabó • Player of the match: Aljoša Matko, Újpest 8.4 • Best player of Nyíregyháza: Milán Májer 7.9

| 4 October 2025 9 | Nyíregyháza | 3–1 | Zalaegerszeg | Nyíregyháza |
| 14:15 CEST | Evangelou (yellow card) 38'; B. Katona 48'; Májer (yellow card) 63'; Benczenleitner 80'; M. Kovács 85' | Report | Bîtca (yellow card) 22'; Daniel 36' (yellow card) 38'; Csonka (yellow card) 63'; G. Bodnár (yellow card) 74' | Stadium: Városi Stadion; Attendance: 4,246; Referee: Márió Zimmermann; Assistant referees: Balázs Szert, Ákos Berényi |
Note: • Nyíregyháza: D. Kovács — Benczenleitner, Evangelou (c), L. Katona — Májer (Farkas (substituted on) 72'), Sanković (M. Kovács (substituted on) 72'), Kovácsréti (Temesvári (substituted on) 85'), B. Katona, Toma — Edomwonyi, Do. Babunski (Ke. Varga (substituted on) 46') • Manager: Szabó • Player of the match: Bálint Katona, Nyíregyháza 8.3 • Best player of Zalaegerszeg: Ștefan Bîtca 7.1

| 18 October 2025 10 | MTK | 5–1 | Nyíregyháza | Budapest |
| 14:00 CEST | Jurina 18'; Á. Molnár 30', 55'; Kata (yellow card) 52'; Bognár 69'; P. Kovács 88' | Report | Májer (yellow card) 17'; Manner 36'; Farkas (yellow card) 74'; Benczenleitner (yellow card) 77' | Stadium: Hidegkuti Nándor Stadion; Attendance: 2,841; Referee: Marcell Derdák; Assistant referees: Norbert Bornemissza, József Aradi |
Note: • Nyíregyháza: D. Kovács — Májer (Farkas (substituted on) 57'), Temesvári, L. Katona (c), Benczenleitner (Antonov (substituted on) 80') — Kovácsréti (Gilbert (substituted on) 72'), M. Kovács, Sanković, B. Katona, Manner (Ke. Varga (substituted on) 57') — Edomwonyi (Do. Babunski (substituted on) 57') • Manager: Szabó • Player of the match: Ádin Molnár, MTK 8.8 • Best player of Nyíregyháza: Balázs Manner 7.3

| 25 October 2025 11 | Nyíregyháza | 0–1 | Kazincbarcika | Nyíregyháza |
| 19:30 CEST | Ke. Varga (yellow card) 4' (yellow-red card) 10'; Edomwonyi (yellow card) 79' | Report | Rasheed (yellow card) 1'; Meskhi (yellow card) 26'; Könyves 48'; Polgár (yellow card) 49'; Szőke (yellow card) 90+5' | Stadium: Városi Stadion; Attendance: 4,098; Referee: Tamás Bognár; Assistant referees: Gergő Vígh-Tarsonyi, Dániel Szalai |
Note: • Nyíregyháza: D. Kovács — Farkas (Bitri (substituted on) 86'), Evangelou (c), Temesvári, L. Katona — Toma, Sanković (M. Kovács (substituted on) 75') — Ke. Varga, B. Katona, Antonov — Edomwonyi • Manager: Szabó • Player of the match: Sodiq Rasheed, Kazincbarcika 8.8 • Best player of Nyíregyháza: Attila Temesvári 7.8

| 31 October 2025 12 | Kisvárda | 0–0 | Nyíregyháza | Budapest |
| 20:00 CET | Melnyk (yellow card) 20'; Jovičić (yellow card) 58' | Report | Temesvári (red card) 15'; Edomwonyi (yellow card) 15'; Kovácsréti (yellow card) 35'; L. Katona (yellow card) 89' | Stadium: Hidegkuti Nándor Stadion; Attendance: 3,005; Referee: Péter Zierkelbach; Assistant referees: Vencel Tóth II, Balázs Buzás |
Note: • Nyíregyháza: D. Kovács — Farkas, Temesvári, L. Katona (c) — Kovácsréti (Alaxai (substituted on) 85'), Sanković (M. Kovács (substituted on) 46'), B. Katona, Antonov — Do. Babunski (Gilbert (substituted on) 46'), Edomwonyi (Toma (substituted on) 71'), Manner (Bitri (substituted on) 19') • Manager: Bódog • Player of the match: Dániel Kovács, Nyíregyháza 8.1 • Best player of Kisvárda: Martin Chlumecký 8.0

| 9 November 2025 13 | Nyíregyháza | 1–1 | Puskás Akadémia | Nyíregyháza |
| 17:30 CET | Manner (yellow card) 1'; Edomwonyi (yellow card) 38' (goal) 41'; D. Kovács (yellow card) 90+3' | Report | Szolnoki (yellow card) 26'; Maceiras (yellow card) 73'; Antonov 90+1' (o.g.) | Stadium: Városi Stadion; Attendance: 3,927; Referee: Márton Rúsz; Assistant referees: Balázs Szert, Ákos Berényi |
Note: • Nyíregyháza: D. Kovács — Farkas, Bitri, L. Katona (c), Antonov — Manner (Gilbert (substituted on) 46'), Sanković (Toma (substituted on) 66'), Kovácsréti (Alaxai (substituted on) 83') — Do. Babunski (Oláh (substituted on) 66'), Edomwonyi (M. Kovács (substituted on) 52'), B. Katona • Manager: Bódog • Player of the match: Laros Duarte, Puskás Akadémia 7.8 • Best player of Nyíregyháza: Bálint Katona 7.5

| 22 November 2025 14 | Ferencváros | 1–3 | Nyíregyháza | Budapest |
| 19:30 CET | Gruber 84' (pen.); B. Varga (yellow card) 90+4' | Report | Manner 3'; Kovácsréti 30' (yellow card) 73'; Antonov (yellow card) 57'; D. Kovács (yellow card) 79'; Toma 85' (yellow card) 90+2' | Stadium: Ferencváros Stadion; Attendance: 6,477; Referee: Tamás Bognár; Assistant referees: Vencel Tóth II, Gergő Vígh-Tarsonyi |
Note: • Nyíregyháza: D. Kovács — Farkas, Bitri, L. Katona (c), Antonov — Manner (Oláh (substituted on) 82'), Sanković (Temesvári (substituted on) 63'), B. Katona, Kovácsréti (D. Nagy (substituted on) 90+2') — Gilbert (Toma (substituted on) 63') — Do. Babunski (M. Kovács (substituted on) 46') • Manager: Bódog • Player of the match: Yuriy Toma, Nyíregyháza 7.7 • Best player of Ferencváros: Alex Tóth 7.2

| 28 November 2025 15 | Nyíregyháza | 0–3 | Debrecen | Nyíregyháza |
| 20:00 CET | M. Kovács (yellow card) 90+2' | Report | Szuhodovszki 6' (yellow card) 48'; Gordić 21'; Manzanara (yellow card) 72'; D. Kocsis 82' (yellow card) 82'; Youga (yellow card) 88' | Stadium: Városi Stadion; Attendance: 7,232; Referee: Gergő Bogár; Assistant referees: Péter Garai, Ákos Berényi |
Note: • Nyíregyháza: D. Kovács — Farkas, Bitri, L. Katona (c), Antonov (Benczenleitner (substituted on) 87') — Manner (M. Kovács (substituted on) 87'), Sanković (Toma (substituted on) 37'), B. Katona, Kovácsréti (Oláh (substituted on) 75') — Gilbert, Do. Babunski (Ke. Varga (substituted on) 46') • Manager: Bódog • Player of the match: Ádám Varga, Debrecen 8.7 • Best player of Nyíregyháza: Bendegúz Farkas 7.2

| 6 December 2025 16 | Diósgyőr | 2–0 | Nyíregyháza | Miskolc |
| 12:30 CET | Acolatse 5', 70'; Bokros (yellow card) 41'; Mi. Mucsányi (yellow card) 77' | Report | L. Katona (yellow card) 41' (yellow-red card) 47'; Farkas (yellow card) 54' | Stadium: Diósgyőri Stadion; Attendance: 5,052; Referee: Péter Antal; Assistant referees: István Szécsényi, Dániel Szalai |
Note: • Nyíregyháza: D. Kovács — Farkas, Bitri (Alaxai (substituted on) 69'), L. Katona, Benczenleitner — B. Katona, M. Kovács (Temesvári (substituted on) 53'), D. Nagy (c) (Do. Babunski (substituted on) 46' (substituted off) 69' (Toma (substituted on) 69')) — Manner (Oláh (substituted on) 78'), Gilbert, Kovácsréti • Manager: Bódog • Player of the match: Elton Acolatse, Diósgyőr 8.3 • Best player of Nyíregyháza: Bálint Katona 7.3

| 13 December 2025 17 | Nyíregyháza | 0–1 | Győri ETO | Nyíregyháza |
| 14:00 CET | Benczenleitner (yellow card) 22'; Toma (yellow card) 89' | Report | Gavrić 66'; Vitális (yellow card) 79'; Njie (yellow card) 90'; Huszár (yellow card) 90'; Schön (yellow card) 90+3' | Stadium: Városi Stadion; Attendance: 4,043; Referee: Tamás Bognár; Assistant referees: Péter Kóbor, Balázs Huszár |
Note: • Nyíregyháza: D. Kovács — Farkas, Alaxai, Temesvári (c), Benczenleitner — Manner (D. Nagy (substituted on) 81'), Sanković (Toma (substituted on) 46'), B. Katona — Gilbert (Ke. Varga (substituted on) 81'), Do. Babunski (Oláh (substituted on) 67'), Kovácsréti • Manager: Bódog • Player of the match: Balázs Megyeri, Győri ETO 10.0 • Best player of Nyíregyháza: Dániel Kovács 7.4

| 20 December 2025 18 | Paks | 2–1 | Nyíregyháza | Paks |
| 15:30 CET | B. Tóth 10', 36'; Ke. Horváth (yellow card) 23'; B. Balogh (yellow card) 33'; Silye (yellow card) 69' | Report | Alaxai (yellow card) 5'; Manner (yellow card) 31'; Temesvári 62'; Benczenleitner (yellow card) 85'; D. Nagy (yellow card) 87' | Stadium: Fehérvári úti Stadion; Attendance: 2,130; Referee: Gergő Bogár; Assistant referees: Dávid Rózsa, Viktor Nagy |
Note: • Nyíregyháza: D. Kovács — Farkas, Alaxai, Temesvári (c), Benczenleitner — Manner (Antonov (substituted on) 67'), Toma (M. Kovács (substituted on) 46'), B. Katona, Kovácsréti (D. Nagy (substituted on) 78') — Gilbert (Oláh (substituted on) 46'), Do. Babunski • Manager: Bódog • Player of the match: Dániel Kovács, Nyíregyháza 7.9 • Best player of Paks: Milán Szekszárdi 7.5

| 24 January 2026 19 | Nyíregyháza | 1–1 | Újpest | Nyíregyháza |
| 12:30 CET | Temesvári (yellow card) 13'; Kvasina 45'; B. Katona (red card) 52' | Report | Beridze 19' | Stadium: Városi Stadion; Attendance: 3,750; Referee: Bence Csonka dr. Assistant referees: Vencel Tóth II, Viktor Nagy |
Note: • Nyíregyháza: D. Kovács — Drešković, Temesvári, L. Katona, Benczenleitner — M. Kovács, B. Katona, Manner (Alaxai (substituted on) 78'), D. Nagy (c) (Tijani (substituted on) 46') — Kvasina, Edomwonyi (Toma (substituted on) 52') • Manager: Bódog (yellow card) 74' • Player of the match: Dávid Banai, Újpest 7.9 • Best player of Nyíregyháza: Marko Kvasina 7.7

| 1 February 2026 20 | Zalaegerszeg | 0–1 | Nyíregyháza | Zalaegerszeg |
| 19:45 CET | Csonka (yellow card) 52'; López (yellow card) 74'; Várkonyi (yellow card) 83' | Report | Tijani (yellow card) 17' (goal) 58'; M. Kovács (yellow card) 23'; Kvasina (yellow card) 76' | Stadium: ZTE Arena; Attendance: 1,700; Referee: Imre Kovács; Assistant referees: Gergő Vígh-Tarsonyi, István Szécsényi |
Note: • Nyíregyháza: D. Kovács — Drešković, Temesvári, L. Katona, Benczenleitner — Manner (Alaxai (substituted on) 86'), M. Kovács, D. Nagy (c) (Toma (substituted on) 55'), M. Katona (Antonov (substituted on) 46') — Kvasina, Tijani (Do. Babunski (substituted on) 67') • Manager: Bódog • Player of the match: Dániel Kovács, Nyíregyháza 8.2 • Best player of Zalaegerszeg: Maxsuell Alegria 7.6

| 8 February 2026 21 | Nyíregyháza | 4–2 | MTK | Nyíregyháza |
| 17:15 CET | Kvasina 13'; Manner (yellow card) 34'; Drešković (yellow card) 41'; Tijani 48', 81' (pen.); Temesvári 73' | Report | H. Németh 8'; Jurek 18'; Vitályos (yellow card) 41' | Stadium: Városi Stadion; Attendance: 3,577; Referee: Péter Zierkelbach; Assistant referees: Balázs Szert, Bence Belicza |
Note: • Nyíregyháza: D. Kovács — Drešković (Jovanov (substituted on) 46'), Temesvári, L. Katona, Benczenleitner — Manner (Toma (substituted on) 59'), M. Kovács, D. Nagy (c) (M. Katona (substituted on) 59') — Kvasina (Oláh (substituted on) 90+3'), Tijani, Antonov (Kovácsréti (substituted on) 90') • Manager: Bódog • Player of the match: Attila Temesvári, Nyíregyháza 8.2 • Best player of MTK: Hunor Németh 7.7

| 15 February 2026 22 | Kazincbarcika | 0–4 | Nyíregyháza | Miskolc |
| 15:30 CET | Smajlagić (yellow card) 9'; Gyollai (yellow card) 45'; Rácz (yellow card) 63' | Report | Baranyai 8' (o.g.); Kvasina 39'; Tijani 45' (pen.); B. Katona (yellow card) 83'; Oláh 90+1' | Stadium: DVTK Stadion; Attendance: 1,005; Referee: Balázs Berke; Assistant referees: Vencel Tóth II, Norbert Bornemissza |
Note: • Nyíregyháza: D. Kovács — Jovanov (Kovácsréti (substituted on) 87'), Drešković, Temesvári, L. Katona, Benczenleitner — D. Nagy (c) (B. Katona (substituted on) 53'), M. Kovács, Antonov (Manner (substituted on) 64') — Tijani (Do. Babunski (substituted on) 87'), Kvasina (Oláh (substituted on) 87') • Manager: Bódog • Player of the match: Marko Kvasina, Nyíregyháza 8.2 • Best player of Kazincbarcika: Meshack Ubochioma 6.9

| 21 February 2026 23 | Nyíregyháza | 2–2 | Kisvárda | Nyíregyháza |
| 14:00 CET | M. Kovács 21'; Drešković 59' | Report | Popoola (yellow card) 7'; Be. Bíró 28'; Jovičić 33'; Melnyk (yellow card) 88' | Stadium: Városi Stadion; Attendance: 4,355; Referee: Bence Hanyecz; Assistant referees: Gergely Becséri, Zoltán Horváth |
Note: • Nyíregyháza: D. Kovács — Drešković, Temesvári, L. Katona, Benczenleitner (Manner (substituted on) 81') — Jovanov (Edomwonyi (substituted on) 46'), D. Nagy (c) (B. Katona (substituted on) 46'), M. Kovács, Antonov — Tijani (Oláh (substituted on) 81'), Kvasina • Manager: Bódog • Player of the match: Aleksandar Jovičić, Nyíregyháza 8.3 • Best player of Kisvárda: Nemanja Antonov 8.0

| 1 March 2026 24 | Puskás Akadémia | 1–2 | Nyíregyháza | Felcsút |
| 16:15 CET | P. Dárdai 68'; Markgráf (yellow card) 80' | Report | M. Kovács (yellow card) 38'; Kvasina 45+2' (pen.) (yellow card) 81'; Drešković (yellow card) 50'; Tijani (yellow card) 55'; L. Katona (yellow card) 59'; M. Katona 78'; Jovanov (yellow card) 86' | Stadium: Pancho Aréna; Attendance: 1,810; Referee: Attila Molnár; Assistant referees: Péter Garai, Viktor Nagy |
Note: • Nyíregyháza: D. Kovács — Drešković, Temesvári, L. Katona (c) — Jovanov, M. Kovács, Toma (B. Katona (substituted on) 46'), Manner (M. Katona (substituted on) 46'), Antonov (Benczenleitner (substituted on) 88') — Kvasina (Korrea (substituted on) 90+2'), Tijani (Edomwonyi (substituted on) 69') • Manager: Bódog • Player of the match: Nemanja Antonov, Nyíregyháza 7.8 • Best player of Puskás Akadémia: Palkó Dárdai 7.4

| 8 March 2026 25 | Nyíregyháza | 1–3 | Ferencváros | Nyíregyháza |
| 18:30 CET | Kvasina 22'; Toma (yellow card) 59'; Temesvári (yellow card) 78' | Report | Abu Fani 3' (yellow card) 60'; Yusuf 8'; B. Nagy (yellow card) 70'; Gómez 90' | Stadium: Városi Stadion; Attendance: 8,013; Referee: Balázs Berke; Assistant referees: Balázs Buzás, Gergely Becséri |
Note: • Nyíregyháza: D. Kovács — Jovanov, Drešković, Temesvári, L. Katona (c) — Manner (B. Katona (substituted on) 46'), Toma (M. Katona (substituted on) 63'), Mi. Kovács, Antonov (Oláh (substituted on) 81') — Kvasina, Tijani (Kovácsréti (substituted on) 63') • Manager: Bódog • Player of the match: Dániel Kovács, Nyíregyháza 8.6 • Best player of Ferencváros: Mohammed Abu Fani 8.4

| 14 March 2026 26 | Debrecen | 1–1 | Nyíregyháza | Debrecen |
| 19:30 CET | Bárány (yellow card) 43'; Dzsudzsák (yellow card) 45+3'; Gordić 77'; Batik (yellow card) 77'; D. Kocsis (yellow card) 79' | Report | Temesvári 57' (yellow card) 77'; Edomwonyi (yellow card) 86' | Stadium: Nagyerdei Stadion; Attendance: 10,884; Referee: Tamás Bognár; Assistant referees: Péter Kóbor, Georgiou Theodoros |
Note: • Nyíregyháza: D. Kovács — Jovanov, Drešković, Temesvári, L. Katona (c), Antonov (Bitri (substituted on) 90+1') — B. Katona (M. Katona (substituted on) 71'), Mi. Kovács, Manner (Toma (substituted on) 46') — Kvasina, Tijani (Edomwonyi (substituted on) 71') • Manager: Bódog • Player of the match: Attila Temesvári, Nyíregyháza 7.9 • Best player of Debrecen: Đorđe Gordić 7.6

| 21 March 2026 27 | Nyíregyháza | 3–1 | Diósgyőr | Nyíregyháza |
| 14:00 CET | L. Katona 55'; Tijani 72', 81' | Report | Sajbán 88' | Stadium: Városi Stadion; Attendance: 7,093; Referee: Bence Csonka dr. Assistant referees: Gergő Vígh-Tarsonyi, Norbert Bornemissza |

| 5 April 2026 28 | Győri ETO | 1–0 | Nyíregyháza | Győr |
| 19:30 CEST | Njie (yellow card) 14'; Benbouali 25' (pen.); Csinger (yellow card) 54'; Gavrić (yellow card) 79'; Pyshchur (yellow card) 90+3' | Report | M. Kovács (yellow card) 11'; B. Katona (yellow card) 37' | Stadium: ETO Park; Attendance: 5,764; Referee: Imre Kovács; Assistant referees: József Aradi, Viktor Nagy |
Note: • Nyíregyháza: D. Kovács (c) — Jovanov, Drešković (Benczenleitner (substituted on) 46'), Temesvári, L. Katona (Bitri (substituted on) 64') — Toma, Mi. Kovács (Edomwonyi (substituted on) 77'), B. Katona (M. Katona (substituted on) 64'), Antonov (Kovácsréti (substituted on) 69') — Kvasina, Tijani • Manager: Bódog • Player of the match: Samuel Petráš, Győri ETO 8.1 • Best player of Nyíregyháza: Dániel Kovács 7.5

| 11 April 2026 29 | Nyíregyháza | 2–0 | Paks | Nyíregyháza |
| 20:00 CEST | Antonov 9'; Manner (yellow card) 53'; Temesvári 72' | Report | Zeke (yellow card) 46' | Stadium: Városi Stadion; Attendance: 5,343; Referee: Gergő Bogár; Assistant referees: Gergely Becséri, Dávid Rózsa |
Note: • Nyíregyháza: D. Kovács — Jovanov, Temesvári, L. Katona (c), Benczenleitner — Manner (M. Katona (substituted on) 62'), M. Kovács, Toma (Drešković (substituted on) 84'), Antonov (B. Katona (substituted on) 70') — Kvasina (Edomwonyi (substituted on) 84'), Tijani • Manager: Bódog (yellow card) 46' • Player of the match: Attila Temesvári, Nyíregyháza 8.5 • Best player of Paks: Bálint Vécsei 7.3

| 17 April 2026 30 | Újpest | 7–2 | Nyíregyháza | Budapest |
| 20:00 CEST | Kr. Horváth 3', 16', 71'; Ljujić 6'; Fenyő (yellow card) 18'; Antonov (yellow card) 47'; M. Kovács (yellow card) 48'; Krajcsovics 53'; Matko 65', 86' | Report | M. Katona (yellow card) 68'; Kvasina 81'; Tijani 84' | Stadium: Szusza Ferenc Stadion; Attendance: 5,110; Referee: Tamás Bognár; Assistant referees: Balázs Szalai, Zoltán Horváth |
Note: • Nyíregyháza: D. Kovács — Jovanov (Vukk (substituted on) 67'), Temesvári, L. Katona (c), Benczenleitner (M. Katona (substituted on) 46') — B. Katona (Edomwonyi (substituted on) 67'), M. Kovács, Toma (Oláh (substituted on) 67'), Antonov — Kvasina, Tijani (Do. Babunski (substituted on) 85') • Manager: Bódog • Player of the match: Krisztofer Horváth, Újpest 10.0 • Best player of Nyíregyháza: Marko Kvasina 7.7

| 25 April 2026 31 | Nyíregyháza | 2–1 | Zalaegerszeg | Nyíregyháza |
| 19:30 CEST | Manner 27'; Toma (yellow card) 30'; Májer (yellow card) 41'; Do. Babunski 82' | Report | López (yellow card) 57'; Amato (yellow card) 72'; Žan Mauricio (yellow card) 82' (On the bench); Teixeira 86' | Stadium: Városi Stadion; Attendance: 4,507; Referee: Márton Rúsz; Assistant referees: József Aradi, Dávid Rózsa |
Note: • Nyíregyháza: Dala — L. Katona (c), Drešković, Temesvári, Antonov (Kovácsréti (substituted on) 59') — Toma, Májer (Jovanov (substituted on) 80'), B. Katona (M. Katona (substituted on) 59'), Manner (Oláh (substituted on) 80') — Tijani (Do. Babunski (substituted on) 66'), Kvasina • Manager: Bódog • Player of the match: Norbert Szendrei, Zalaegerszeg 8.3 • Best player of Nyíregyháza: Balázs Manner 7.3

| 2 May 2026 32 | MTK | 1–1 | Nyíregyháza | Budapest |
| 13:00 CEST | Kata (yellow card) 51'; H. Németh 53'; Armalas (yellow card) 67' | Report | M. Kovács (yellow card) 46'; Temesvári (yellow card) 65'; Tijani (yellow card) 71' (goal) 90' (pen.) | Stadium: Hidegkuti Nándor Stadion; Attendance: 3,485; Referee: Márió Zimmermann; Assistant referees: Ákos Berényi, Dávid Rózsa |
Note: • Nyíregyháza: Dala — Jovanov (Korrea (substituted on) 84'), Drešković (M. Katona (substituted on) 64'), Temesvári, L. Katona (c) — Manner, M. Kovács, B. Katona (Do. Babunski (substituted on) 78'), Antonov (Kovácsréti (substituted on) 64') — Kvasina, Tijani • Manager: Bódog • Player of the match: Mihály Kata, MTK 8.4 • Best player of Nyíregyháza: Martin Dala 7.8

| 15 May 2026 33 | Nyíregyháza | 2–2 | Kazincbarcika | Nyíregyháza |
| 17:45 CEST | Tijani (yellow card) 4'; Kvasina 6'; Benczenleitner (yellow card) 10'; Kovácsréti 75' | Report | Ferenczi 66'; Szőke (yellow card) 69'; Major (yellow card) 77'; Trencsényi 86'; Klausz (yellow card) 90' | Stadium: Városi Stadion; Attendance: 6,844; Referee: Péter Antal; Assistant referees: Balázs Buzás, Norbert Bornemissza |

=== Magyar Kupa ===
==== Round of 64 ====
| 13 September 2025 R64 | Békéscsaba (NB II) | 0–0 (a.e.t.) (4–2 p) | Nyíregyháza | Békéscsaba |
| 18:00 CEST | Mikló (yellow card) 21'; Takács (yellow card) 89' | Report | Farkas (yellow card) 23'; Edomwonyi (yellow card) 91'; L. Katona (yellow card) 93'; K. Varga (yellow card) 117' | Stadium: Kórház utcai Stadion; Attendance: 1,140; Referee: Péter Antal; Assistant referees: Norbert Bornemissza, Péter Garai |
| | Penalties |
| | Mikló (penalty scored); Hodonicki (penalty scored); G. Nagy (penalty scored); Viczián (penalty scored) | | (penalty missed) D. Babunski; (penalty scored) Kovácsréti; (penalty scored) Korrea; (penalty missed) Gilbert |
Note: • Nyíregyháza: Kersák — Farkas (M. Kovács (substituted on) 46'), Evangelou (Korrea (substituted on) 106'), L. Katona, Antonov (Benczenleitner (substituted on) 91'), Májer, Sanković, M. Katona (K. Varga (substituted on) 91'), Kovácsréti, Edomwonyi (Do. Babunski (substituted on) 91'), B. Katona (Gilbert (substituted on) 106') • Manager: Szabó
