= Dániel Kovács (footballer, born 1994) =

Hungarian footballer

Personal information
- Date of birth: 16 January 1994 (age 32)
- Place of birth: Gyula, Hungary
- Height: 1.90 m (6 ft 3 in)
- Position: Goalkeeper

Team information
- Current team: Nyíregyháza
- Number: 63

Youth career
- 2006–2009: Gyula
- 2009–2011: Békéscsaba
- 2011–2014: Vasas
- 2014–2015: Fluminense
- 2015: Kecskemét

Senior career*
Years	Team	Apps	(Gls)
2015–2017	Zalaegerszeg	4	(0)
2016–2017	→ Csákvár (loan)	36	(0)
2017–2019	Ferencváros	0	(0)
2017–2019	→ Soroksár (loan)	61	(0)
2019–2023	Fehérvár	75	(0)
2024–2025	Volos	33	(0)
2025–	Nyíregyháza	27	(0)
- * Club domestic league appearances and goals as of 30 May 2026

Dániel Kovács (born 16 January 1994) is a Hungarian professional footballer who plays as a goalkeeper for Nemzeti Bajnokság I club Nyíregyháza Spartacus FC.

== Career statistics ==
As of 15 May 2022.

Appearances and goals by club, season and competition
Club	Season	League			Cup		Continental		Other		Total	
Club	Season	Division	Apps	Goals	Apps	Goals	Apps	Goals	Apps	Goals	Apps	Goals
Zalaegerszeg	2015–16	Nemzeti Bajnokság II	4	0	4	0	—		0	0	8	0
Zalaegerszeg	Total		4	0	4	0	0	0	0	0	8	0
Csákvár	2016–17	Nemzeti Bajnokság II	36	0	0	0	—		0	0	36	0
Csákvár	Total		36	0	0	0	0	0	0	0	36	0
Soroksár	2017–18	Nemzeti Bajnokság II	25	0	2	0	—		0	0	27	0
Soroksár	2018–19	Nemzeti Bajnokság II	36	0	6	0	—		0	0	42	0
Soroksár	Total		61	0	8	0	0	0	0	0	69	0
Fehérvár	2019–20	Nemzeti Bajnokság I	1	0	2	0	0	0	0	0	3	0
Fehérvár	2020–21	Nemzeti Bajnokság I	12	0	6	0	0	0	0	0	18	0
Fehérvár	2021–22	Nemzeti Bajnokság I	27	0	3	0	0	0	0	0	30	0
Fehérvár	Total		40	0	11	0	0	0	0	0	51	0
Nyíregyháza	2025–26	2025–26 Nemzeti Bajnokság I	0	0	0	0	—		0	0	0	0
Career total			141	0	23	0	0	0	0	0	164	0

== Honours ==
Individual

- Nemzeti Bajnokság I Save of the Month: September 2025
