= Benjámin Oláh =

Hungarian footballer (born 2005)

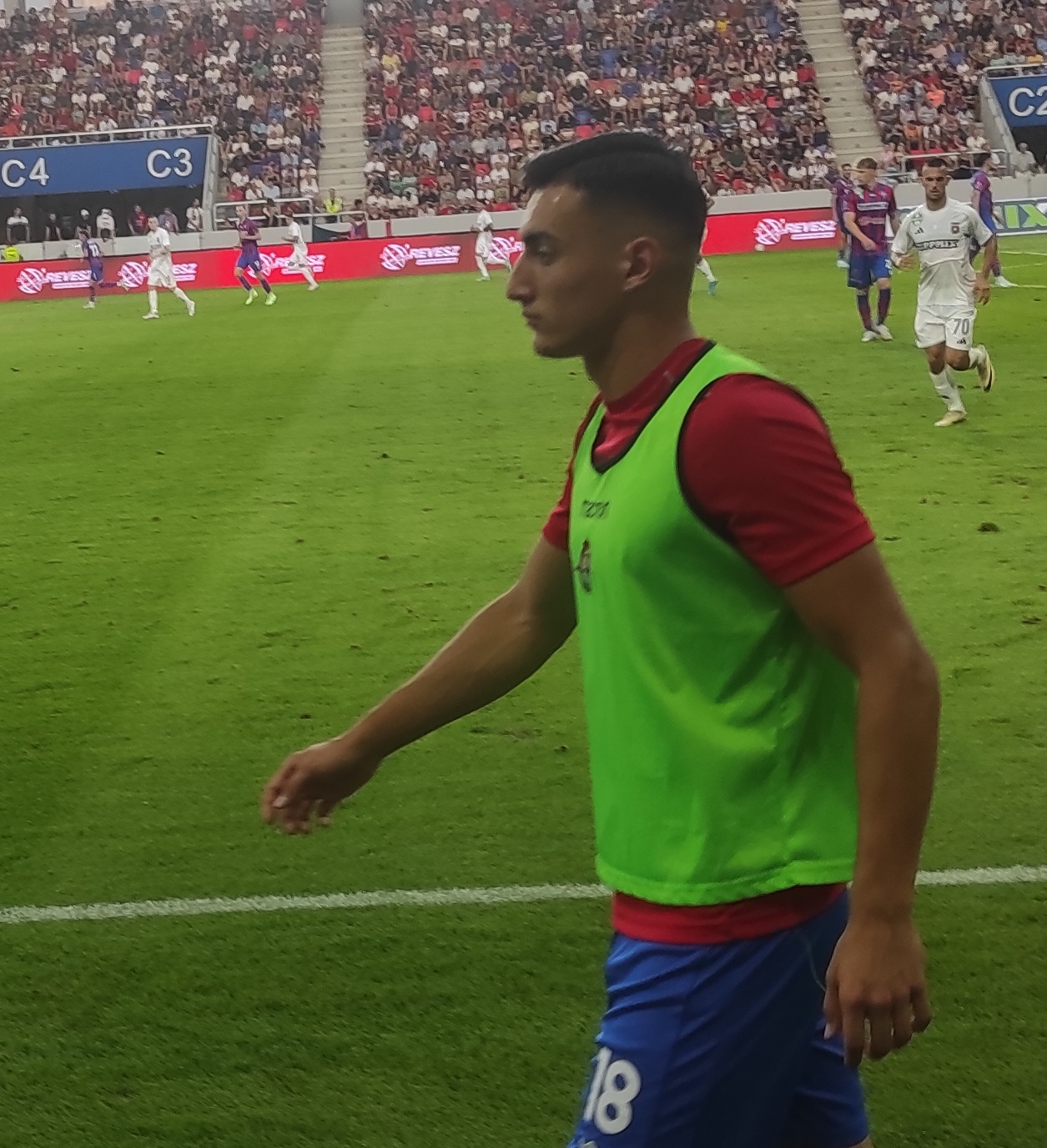
- Oláh warming up for Nyíregyháza in 2024

Personal information
- Date of birth: 5 December 2005 (age 20)
- Place of birth: Nyíregyháza, Hungary
- Position: Forward

Team information
- Current team: Nyíregyháza
- Number: 17

Youth career
- 2011–2015: Kótaj
- 2015–2017: Nyíregyházi Sportcentrum
- 2017–2022: Nyíregyháza

Senior career*
Years	Team	Apps	(Gls)
2022–	Nyíregyháza II	54	(33)
2022–	Nyíregyháza	27	(1)
2023–2024	→ Tiszaújváros (loan)	17	(5)
2025	→ Mezőkövesd (loan)	8	(0)
- * Club domestic league appearances and goals as of 30 May 2026

Benjámin Oláh (born 5 December 2005) is a Hungarian professional footballer who plays as a forward for Nemzeti Bajnokság I club Nyíregyháza.

== Career ==
On 15 June 2022, homegrown footballer Oláh was a key player for Nyíregyháza II, and he scored seven goals in the Megyei Bajnokság I the previous season before signing a professional contract with the first team despite interest from other teams.

On 15 February 2026, he scored his first goal in the Nemzeti Bajnokság I in a 4–0 away win against Kazincbarcika, finishing with his right foot despite being naturally left-footed.

== Career statistics ==
As of match played 17 April 2026

Appearances and goals by club, season and competition
Club	Season	League			Magyar Kupa		Other		Total	
Club	Season	Division	Apps	Goals	Apps	Goals	Apps	Goals	Apps	Goals
Nyíregyháza II	2021–22	Megyei Bajnokság I	5	7	—		2 (Note: Appearances in Megyei Bajnokság I promotion play-offs)	0	7	7
Nyíregyháza II	2022–23	Megyei Bajnokság I	23	12	—		—		23	12
Nyíregyháza II	2023–24	Megyei Bajnokság I	1	0	—		—		1	0
Nyíregyháza II	2024–25	Nemzeti Bajnokság III	12	3	—		—		12	3
Nyíregyháza II	2025–26	Nemzeti Bajnokság III	13	11	—		—		13	11
Nyíregyháza II	Total		54	33	—		2	0	56	33
Nyíregyháza	2022–23	Nemzeti Bajnokság II	6	0	0	0	2 (Note: Appearances in Nemzeti Bajnokság II relegation play-offs)	0	8	0
Nyíregyháza	2023–24	Nemzeti Bajnokság II	7	0	1	0	—		8	0
Nyíregyháza	2024–25	Nemzeti Bajnokság I	2	0	0	0	—		2	0
Nyíregyháza	2025–26	Nemzeti Bajnokság I	11	1	—		—		11	1
Nyíregyháza	Total		26	1	1	0	2	0	29	1
Tiszaújváros (loan)	2023–24	Nemzeti Bajnokság III	17	5	3	0	—		20	5
Mezőkövesd (loan)	2024–25	Nemzeti Bajnokság II	8	0	1	0	—		9	0
Career total			105	39	5	0	4	0	114	39

== Honours ==
Nyíregyháza II

- Megyei Bajnokság I – Szabolcs–Szatmár–Bereg: 2021–22

Nyíregyháza

- Nemzeti Bajnokság II: 2023–24
