= Bendegúz Farkas =

Hungarian footballer (born 2004)

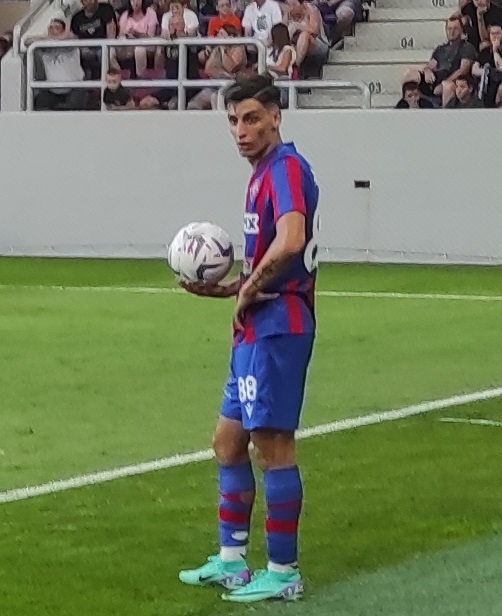
- Farkas playing for Nyíregyháza in 2024

Personal information
- Full name: Bendegúz Bence Farkas
- Date of birth: 5 August 2004 (age 22)
- Place of birth: Budapest, Hungary
- Height: 1.81 m (5 ft 11 in)
- Position: Defender

Team information
- Current team: Nyíregyháza (on loan from Puskás Akadémia)
- Number: 88

Youth career
- 2009–2016: Felsőpakony
- 2016–2022: Puskás Akadémia

Senior career*
Years	Team	Apps	(Gls)
2021–2022	Puskás Akadémia II	13	(0)
2022–	Puskás Akadémia	0	(0)
2022–	→ Nyíregyháza (loan)	91	(3)
2024–2025	→ Nyíregyháza II (loan)	2	(0)

International career^{‡}
2018–2019	Hungary U15	7	(0)
2019–2020	Hungary U16	6	(0)
2022–2023	Hungary U19	10	(0)
2024	Hungary U20	1	(0)
2025–	Hungary U21	5	(0)
- * Club domestic league appearances and goals as of 30 May 2026 ‡ National team caps and goals as of 18 November 2025

Bendegúz Bence Farkas (born 5 August 2004) is a Hungarian professional footballer who plays as a defender for Nemzeti Bajnokság I club Nyíregyháza on loan from Puskás Akadémia.

== Career ==
Farkas joined Puskás Akadémia in 2016, where he developed through the club's youth teams before reaching the senior squad. He subsequently became part of the first-team setup and gained professional experience during several loan spells with Nyíregyháza, playing a role in the club's Nemzeti Bajnokság II title-winning season and later appearing in Nemzeti Bajnokság I. On 19 July 2025, he was again loaned to Nyíregyháza, marking his fourth spell with the club.

== Career statistics ==
=== Club ===
As of match played 20 December 2025

Appearances and goals by club, season and competition
Club	Season	League			Magyar Kupa		Other		Total	
Club	Season	Division	Apps	Goals	Apps	Goals	Apps	Goals	Apps	Goals
Puskás Akadémia II	2020–21	Nemzeti Bajnokság III	1	0	—		—		1	0
Puskás Akadémia II	2021–22	Nemzeti Bajnokság III	12	0	—		—		12	0
Puskás Akadémia II	Total		13	0	—		—		13	0
Puskás Akadémia	2021–22	Nemzeti Bajnokság I	0	0	—		—		0	0
Nyíregyháza (loan)	2022–23	Nemzeti Bajnokság II	32	1	1	0	2 (Note: Appearances in Nemzeti Bajnokság II relegation play-offs)	0	35	1
Nyíregyháza (loan)	2023–24	Nemzeti Bajnokság II	31	2	5	0	—		36	2
Nyíregyháza (loan)	2024–25	Nemzeti Bajnokság I	13	0	0	0	—		13	0
Nyíregyháza (loan)	2025–26	Nemzeti Bajnokság I	15	0	1	0	—		16	0
Nyíregyháza (loan)	Total		91	3	7	0	2	0	100	3
Nyíregyháza II (loan)	2024–25	Nemzeti Bajnokság III	2	0	—		—		2	0
Career total			106	3	7	0	2	0	115	3

=== International ===
As of match played 18 November 2025

Appearances and goals by national team and year
Team	Year	Total	
Team	Year	Apps	Goals
Hungary U15	2018	2	0
Hungary U15	2019	5	0
Hungary U15	Total	7	0
Hungary U16	2019	4	0
Hungary U16	2020	2	0
Hungary U16	Total	6	0
Hungary U19	2022	7	0
Hungary U19	2023	3	0
Hungary U19	Total	10	0
Hungary U20	2024	1	0
Hungary U21	2025	5	0
Career total		29	0

== Honours ==
Nyíregyháza

- Nemzeti Bajnokság II: 2023–24
