= Milán Kovács =

Hungarian footballer (born 1999)

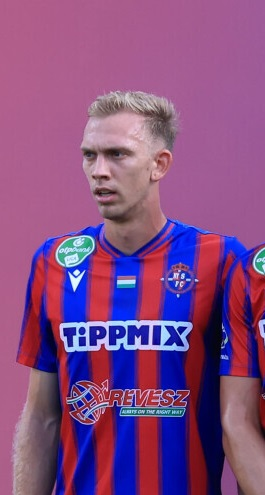
- Kovács playing for Nyíregyháza in 2024

Personal information
- Date of birth: 24 September 1999 (age 27)
- Place of birth: Baja, Hungary
- Height: 1.92 m (6 ft 4 in)
- Position: Midfielder

Team information
- Current team: Nyíregyháza
- Number: 12

Youth career
- 2005–2011: Baja
- 2011–2018: Vasas Kubala Akadémia

Senior career*
| Years | Team | Apps | (Gls) |
| 2018–2022 | Vasas | 65 | (3) |
| 2021–2022 | → Szeged (loan) | 36 | (2) |
| 2022–2024 | Gyirmót | 64 | (4) |
| 2024– | Nyíregyháza | 41 | (3) |
| 2024– | Nyíregyháza II | 4 | (0) |
- * Club domestic league appearances and goals as of 30 May 2026

Milán Kovács (born 24 September 1999) is a Hungarian professional footballer who plays as a midfielder for Nemzeti Bajnokság I club Nyíregyháza.

== Career ==
Kovács, a product of the Vasas academy, was promoted to the senior team after signing a three-year professional contract with the Nemzeti Bajnokság II club on 13 July 2018.

On 13 July 2021, he was loaned out to fellow Nemzeti Bajnokság II team Szeged for the 2021–22 season.

On 17 June 2022, Kovács signed a three-year contract with the Nemzeti Bajnokság II club Gyirmót, alongside Dominik Soltész.

On 14 June 2024, Nemzeti Bajnokság I club Nyíregyháza announced on its website that it had signed Kovács to a three-year contract. He scored his first goal in the Nemzeti Bajnokság I on 16 May 2025 in a 2–2 away draw against Újpest, a result that contributed to Nyíregyháza avoiding relegation.

== Career statistics ==
As of match played 21 February 2026

Appearances and goals by club, season and competition
| Club | Season | League | | | Magyar Kupa | | Total | |
| Club | Season | Division | Apps | Goals | Apps | Goals | Apps | Goals |
|---|---|---|---|---|---|---|---|---|
| Vasas | 2018–19 | Nemzeti Bajnokság II | 21 | 2 | 2 | 0 | 23 | 2 |
| Vasas | 2019–20 | Nemzeti Bajnokság II | 22 | 1 | 2 | 0 | 24 | 1 |
| Vasas | 2020–21 | Nemzeti Bajnokság II | 22 | 0 | 2 | 1 | 24 | 1 |
| Vasas | Total | | 65 | 3 | 6 | 1 | 71 | 4 |
| Szeged (loan) | 2021–22 | Nemzeti Bajnokság II | 36 | 2 | 3 | 0 | 39 | 2 |
| Gyirmót | 2022–23 | Nemzeti Bajnokság II | 36 | 2 | 1 | 0 | 37 | 2 |
| Gyirmót | 2023–24 | Nemzeti Bajnokság II | 28 | 2 | 2 | 0 | 30 | 2 |
| Gyirmót | Total | | 64 | 4 | 3 | 0 | 67 | 4 |
| Nyíregyháza | 2024–25 | Nemzeti Bajnokság I | 17 | 1 | 3 | 0 | 20 | 1 |
| Nyíregyháza | 2025–26 | Nemzeti Bajnokság I | 15 | 2 | 1 | 0 | 16 | 2 |
| Nyíregyháza | Total | | 32 | 3 | 4 | 0 | 36 | 3 |
| Nyíregyháza II | 2024–25 | Nemzeti Bajnokság III | 3 | 0 | — | | 3 | 0 |
| Nyíregyháza II | 2025–26 | Nemzeti Bajnokság III | 1 | 0 | — | | 1 | 0 |
| Nyíregyháza II | Total | | 4 | 0 | — | | 4 | 0 |
| Career total | | | 201 | 12 | 16 | 1 | 217 | 13 |
