= Muhamed Tijani =

Nigerian footballer

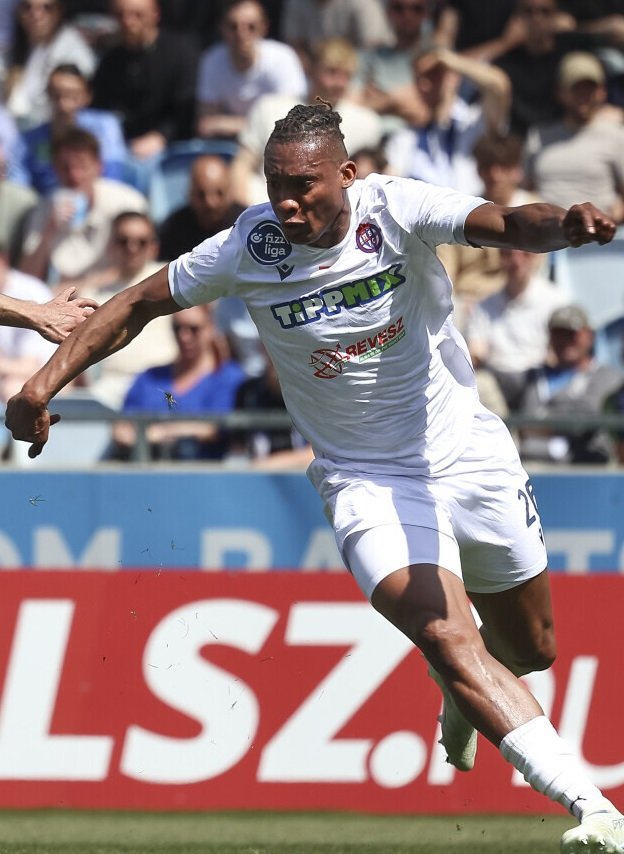
- Tijani playing for Nyíregyháza in 2026

Personal information
- Date of birth: 26 July 2000 (age 26)
- Place of birth: Lagos, Nigeria
- Height: 1.95 m (6 ft 5 in)
- Position: Forward

Team information
- Current team: Újpest

Youth career
- –2019: 36 Lion FC
- 2018–2019: Baník Ostrava

Senior career*
Years	Team	Apps	(Gls)
2019–2023	Baník Ostrava	28	(4)
2019	→ Třinec (loan)	10	(0)
2020	→ Karviná (loan)	5	(0)
2021	→ Třinec (loan)	8	(0)
2021–2022	→ Táborsko (loan)	32	(11)
2023–2026	Slavia Prague	25	(2)
2024–2025	→ Plymouth Argyle (loan)	13	(2)
2025	→ Sigma Olomouc (loan)	13	(1)
2026	→ Nyíregyháza (loan)	15	(8)
2026–	Újpest	0	(0)

International career
2019	Nigeria U20	4	(1)
- * Club domestic league appearances and goals as of 16:06, 30 May 2026 (UTC)

Muhamed Tijani (born 26 July 2000) is a Nigerian professional footballer who plays as a forward for Nemzeti Bajnokság I side Újpest.

== Club career ==
=== Baník Ostrava ===
Tijani joined Czech club Baník Ostrava's youth system from Nigerian side 36 Lion FC on 27 September 2018. He signed a professional contract with Baník Ostrava on 27 August 2019.

==== 2019–20: Loans to Třinec and Karviná ====
Tijani joined Třinec on loan in the summer of 2019. He made his competitive debut for the club on 27 August in a cup match against TJ Valašské Meziříčí.

In February 2020, Tijani was recalled early from his loan to Třinec and moved on loan to Karviná. He made his debut for Karviná on 3 June against Slovácko.

==== 2020–21: Return to Baník Ostrava and second loan to Třinec ====
He returned from loan and made his debut for Baník Ostrava against his former club Karviná on 21 August 2020. Tijani scored his first goal for the club in a 3–0 league victory over FK Pardubice on 19 September.

Tijani returned to Třinec on loan on 8 February 2021. He made his second debut against Blansko on 6 March.

==== 2021–22: Loan to Táborsko ====
Tijani was sent on loan to Táborsko for one year on 23 July 2021. He made his debut against Zbrojovka Brno that same day. He scored his first two goals on 11 August in the Tatran Sedlčany Cup.

==== Return to Baník Ostrava ====
After returning to Baník Ostrava, he made his 2022–23 Czech First League debut against SK Sigma Olomouc on 30 July 2022. He scored his first goal of the season on 6 August against Bohemians 1905.

=== Slavia Prague ===
On 21 June 2023, Tijani joined Slavia Prague, signing a contract valid until 2028.

==== Loan to Plymouth Argyle ====
On 2 July 2024, Tijani signed for English Championship team Plymouth Argyle on a one-year loan deal. He made his debut for Plymouth on the opening day of the 2024–25 season against Sheffield Wednesday, but after making just two further league appearances, both as a substitute, he tore his hamstring in training in October 2024.

==== Loan to Sigma Olomouc ====
On 31 July 2025, Tijani joined Sigma Olomouc on a one-year loan deal.

==== Loan to Nyíregyháza ====
On 20 January 2026, Tijani joined Nemzeti Bajnokság I club Nyíregyháza on a half-year loan deal.

=== Újpest ===
On 19 June 2026, Tijani signed a contract with Nemzeti Bajnokság I club Újpest.

== International career ==
Tijani was part of the Nigeria under-20 squad that competed in the 2019 FIFA U-20 World Cup. He played his first international match on 24 May 2019 against the Qatar under-20 side. He scored his first international goal on 30 May by way of a penalty kick against the Ukraine under-20s.

== Career statistics ==
As of match played 3 May 2025

Appearances and goals by club, season and competition
Club	Season	League			National cup (Note: Includes Czech Cup)		League cup		Europe		Total	
Club	Season	Division	Apps	Goals	Apps	Goals	Apps	Goals	Apps	Goals	Apps	Goals
Baník Ostrava	2019–20	Czech First League	0	0	0	0	—		—		0	0
Baník Ostrava	2020–21	Czech First League	11	1	1	0	—		—		12	1
Baník Ostrava	2022–23	Czech First League	21	3	3	1	—		—		24	4
Baník Ostrava	Total		32	4	4	1	—		—		36	5
Fotbal Třinec (loan)	2019–20	Czech National League	10	0	2	0	—		—		12	0
MFK Karviná (loan)	2019–20	Czech First League	5	0	0	0	—		—		5	0
Třinec (loan)	2020–21	Czech National League	8	0	0	0	—		—		8	0
Táborsko (loan)	2021–22	Czech National League	32	11	1	2	—		—		33	13
Slavia Prague	2023–24	Czech First League	25	2	1	0	—		5 (Note: Appearances in UEFA Europa League)	2	31	4
Plymouth Argyle	2024–25	EFL Championship	13	2	0	0	—		0	0	13	2
Career total			125	19	8	3	—		5	2	138	24
