= Kevin Varga =

Hungarian footballer (born 1996)

Personal information
- Date of birth: 30 March 1996 (age 30)
- Place of birth: Karcag, Hungary
- Height: 1.78 m (5 ft 10 in)
- Position: Midfielder

Team information
- Current team: Kispest Honvéd
- Number: 21

Youth career
- 2003–2005: Karcag
- 2005–2006: Debrecen
- 2006–2008: Karcag
- 2008–2011: MTK Budapest
- 2009–2010: → Karcag (loan)
- 2011–2015: Debrecen

Senior career*
Years	Team	Apps	(Gls)
2015	Debrecen II	20	(3)
2015–2020	Debrecen	93	(10)
2015–2016	→ Balmazújváros (loan)	18	(3)
2015–2016	→ Balmazújváros II (loan)	5	(6)
2017	→ Cigánd (loan)	9	(0)
2020–2022	Kasımpaşa	51	(5)
2022	→ Young Boys (loan)	6	(0)
2022–2023	Hatayspor	11	(0)
2023	Debrecen	12	(2)
2023–2024	Apollon Limassol	9	(0)
2024	Sepsi OSK	24	(2)
2024–2025	Ankaragücü	18	(1)
2025	Nyíregyháza	6	(0)
2026–	Kispest Honvéd	9	(0)

International career^{‡}
2018	Hungary U21	4	(0)
2018–2022	Hungary	13	(1)
- * Club domestic league appearances and goals as of 31 May 2026 ‡ National team caps and goals as of 15 November 2021

Kevin Varga (born 30 March 1996) is a Hungarian professional footballer who plays as a midfielder for Nemzeti Bajnokság II club Kispest Honvéd.

== Club career ==
=== Debrecen ===
On 18 August 2017, Varga played his first match for Debrecen in a 4–1 win against Vasas in the Hungarian League.

=== Kasımpaşa ===
On 2 September 2020, Varga completed a €850,000 transfer to Kasımpaşa, signing a four-year-long contract.

==== Loan to Young Boys ====
On 9 February 2022, Varga moved on loan to Young Boys in Switzerland.

=== Return to Debrecen ===
On 16 February 2023, he moved back to Debrecen in the Nemzeti Bajnokság I.

=== Nyíregyháza ===
On 15 August 2025, Varga joined Nemzeti Bajnokság I side Nyíregyháza, signing a two-year contract.

== International career ==
He made his debut for Hungary national team on 9 June 2018 in a friendly against Australia.

On 1 June 2021, Varga was included in the final 26-man squad to represent Hungary at the rescheduled UEFA Euro 2020 tournament.

== Career statistics ==
=== Club ===
As of 8 November 2024

Appearances and goals by club, season and competition
Club	Season	League		Cup		League Cup		Europe		Total	
Club	Season	Apps	Goals	Apps	Goals	Apps	Goals	Apps	Goals	Apps	Goals
Debrecen II	2013–14	1	0	–		–		–		1	0
Debrecen II	2014–15	18	3	–		–		–		18	3
Debrecen II	2017–18	1	0	–		–		–		1	0
Debrecen II	Total	20	3	–		–		–		20	3
Debrecen	2014–15	0	0	1	0	4	1	–		5	1
Debrecen	2017–18	27	3	6	0	–		–		33	3
Debrecen	2018–19	32	3	7	0	–		–		39	3
Debrecen	2019–20	29	4	3	0	–		4	2	36	6
Debrecen	2020–21	5	0	0	0	–		–		5	0
Debrecen	Total	93	10	17	0	4	1	4	2	118	13
Balmazújváros (loan)	2015–16	12	3	0	0	–		–		12	3
Balmazújváros (loan)	2016–17	6	0	1	0	–		–		7	0
Balmazújváros (loan)	Total	18	3	1	0	–		–		19	3
Balmazújváros II (loan)	2015–16	5	6	–		–		–		5	6
Cigánd (loan)	2016–17	9	0	–		–		–		9	0
Kasımpaşa	2020–21	37	4	2	0	–		–		39	4
Kasımpaşa	2021–22	14	1	2	1	–		–		16	2
Kasımpaşa	Total	51	5	4	1	–		–		55	6
Young Boys (loan)	2021–22	6	0	–		–		–		6	0
Hatayspor	2022–23	11	0	1	0	–		–		12	0
Debrecen	2022–23	12	2	1	0	–		–		13	2
Apollon Limassol	2023–24	9	0	1	0	–		–		10	0
Sepsi OSK	2023–24	18	1	–		–		–		18	1
Sepsi OSK	2024–25	6	1	0	0	–		–		6	1
Sepsi OSK	Total	24	2	0	0	–		–		24	2
Ankaragücü	2024–25	8	0	1	1	—		—		9	1
Nyíregyháza	2025–26	0	0	0	0	—		—		0	0
Career total		266	31	24	2	4	1	4	2	298	36

=== International ===
As of match played 15 November 2021.

Appearances and goals by national team and year
National team	Year	Apps	Goals
Hungary	2018	1	0
Hungary	2019	0	0
Hungary	2020	2	1
Hungary	2021	10	0
Hungary	2022	0	0
Total		13	1

Scores and results list Hungary's goal tally first, score column indicates score after each Varga goal.

List of international goals scored by Kevin Varga
No.	Date	Venue	Cap	Opponent	Score	Result	Competition
1	18 November 2020	Puskás Aréna, Budapest, Hungary	3	Turkey	2–0	2–0	2020–21 UEFA Nations League B

== Honours ==
Debrecen

- Ligakupa runner-up: 2014–15
