= Dantaye Gilbert =

Trinidad and Tobago footballer

Personal information
- Date of birth: 3 December 2004 (age 21)
- Place of birth: Trinidad and Tobago
- Height: 1.84 m (6 ft 0 in)
- Position: Midfielder

Team information
- Current team: Baník Ostrava
- Number: 7

Senior career*
Years	Team	Apps	(Gls)
2023	San Juan Jabloteh	?	(1)
2023–2025	Jong PSV	46	(8)
2025	Nyíregyháza	8	(0)
2026	Dukla Prague	14	(2)
2026–	Baník Ostrava	0	(0)

International career^{‡}
2022	Trinidad and Tobago U20		
2024–	Trinidad and Tobago	14	(2)
- * Club domestic league appearances and goals as of 15 May 2026 ‡ National team caps and goals as of 12 November 2026

Dantaye Gilbert (born 3 December 2004) is a Trinidadian professional footballer who plays as a midfielder for Czech First League club Baník Ostrava and the Trinidad and Tobago national team.

== Club career ==
Gilbert attended Presentation College in San Fernando and played for San Juan Jabloteh in his homeland.

He scored San Juan Jabloteh's first goal in their inaugural season in the TT Premier Football League. In September 2023, Gilbert signed a two-year deal with Dutch Eredivisie club side PSV Eindhoven. Shortly after this he made his debut for PSV Eindhoven under-21s against Nottingham Forest under-21s in the Premier League International Cup.

He made his Eerste Divisie debut for Jong PSV on 15 September 2023, against De Graafschap. On 6 October 2023, he scored his first league goal in the Eerste Divisie, for Jong PSV against MVV Maastricht.

On 4 September 2025, Gilbert signed with Nemzeti Bajnokság I club Nyíregyháza Spartacus FC.

On 28 January 2026, Gilbert signed a contract with Czech First League club Dukla Prague as a free agent.

On 12 July 2026, Gilbert signed a three-year contract with Czech First League club Baník Ostrava.

== International career ==
Gilbert has represented the Trinidad and Tobago U-20 side.

Gilbert made his debut for the senior Trinidad and Tobago national team on 8 June 2024 in a World Cup qualifier against the Bahamas.

== Career statistics ==
=== Club ===
As of match played 12 April 2024

Appearances and goals by club, season and competition
Club	Season	League			Cup		Europe		Other		Total	
Club	Season	Division	Apps	Goals	Apps	Goals	Apps	Goals	Apps	Goals	Apps	Goals
Jong PSV	2023–24	Eerste Divisie	18	3	—		—		—		18	3
Career total			18	3	0	0	0	0	0	0	18	3

=== International ===
As of match played 12 November 2026

Appearances and goals by national team and year
National team	Year	Apps	Goals
Trinidad and Tobago	2023	4	0
Trinidad and Tobago	2024	4	1
Trinidad and Tobago	2025	6	1
Total		14	2

Scores and results list Trinidad and Tobago's goal tally first, score column indicates score after each Gilbert goal.

List of international goals scored by Dantaye Gilbert
No.	Date	Venue	Opponent	Score	Result	Competition
1	14 October 2024	Dwight Yorke Stadium, Scarborough, Trinidad and Tobago	Cuba	1–0	3–1	2024–25 CONCACAF Nations League
2	12 November 2026	Sir Vivian Richards Stadium, St. John's, Antigua and Barbuda	Antigua and Barbuda	1–1	3–2	2026–27 CONCACAF Nations League
