= Bálint Katona =

Hungarian footballer (born 2002)

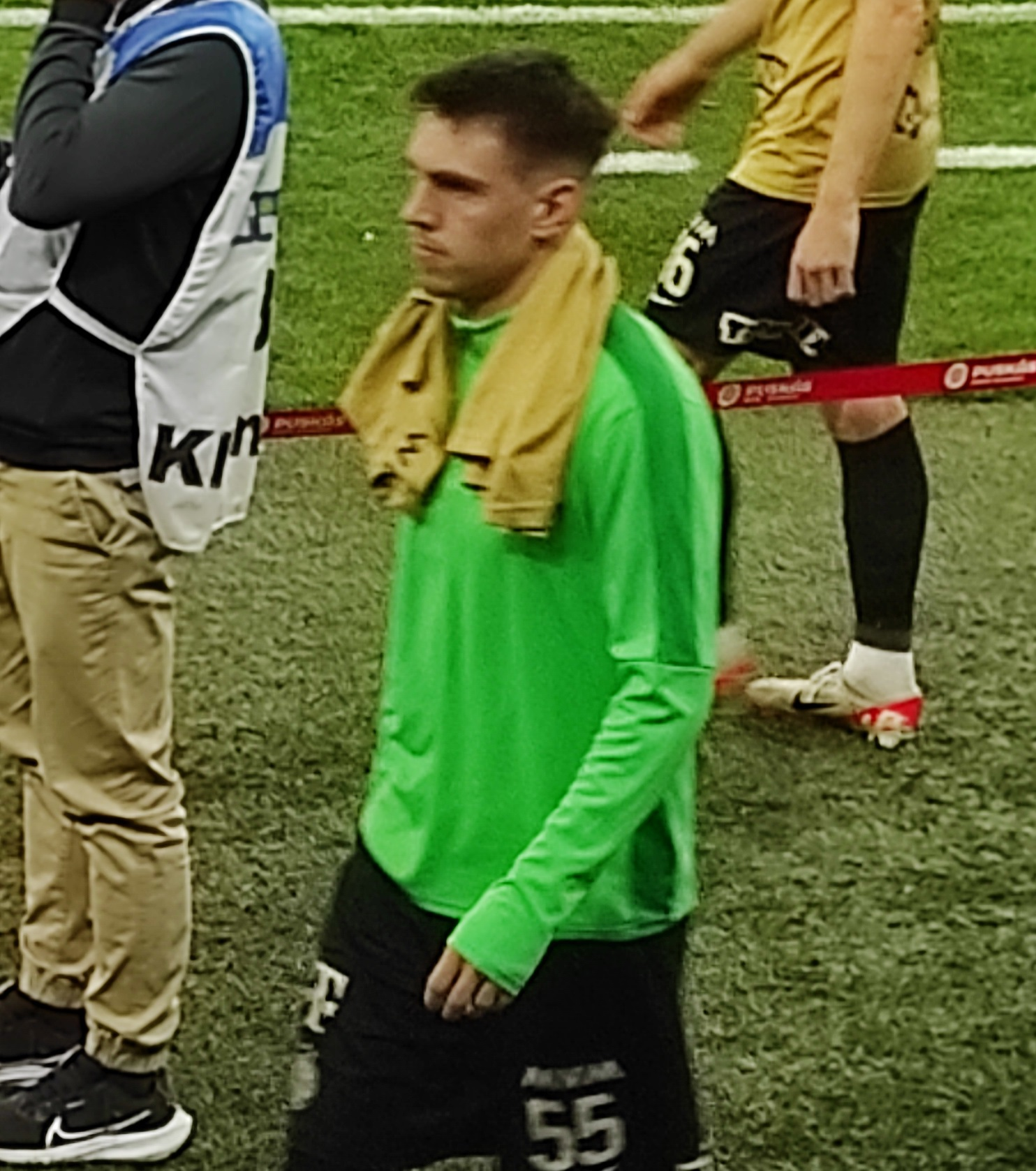
- Katona with Ferencváros in 2024

Personal information
- Full name: Bálint Lajos Katona
- Date of birth: 7 September 2002 (age 24)
- Place of birth: Budapest, Hungary
- Height: 1.78 m (5 ft 10 in)
- Position: Midfielder

Team information
- Current team: Nyíregyháza
- Number: 55

Youth career
- 2008–2010: Vasas-Pasarét
- 2010–2018: Vasas-Akadémia
- 2018–2021: Ferencváros

Senior career*
Years	Team	Apps	(Gls)
2020–2023	Ferencváros II	25	(6)
2020–2025	Ferencváros	12	(0)
2021–2023	→ Kecskemét (loan)	66	(13)
2023	→ Kecskemét II (loan)	1	(0)
2024–2025	→ Kecskemét (loan)	24	(3)
2025–	Nyíregyháza	28	(1)

International career^{‡}
2022–2023	Hungary U21	6	(0)
- * Club domestic league appearances and goals as of 30 May 2026 ‡ National team caps and goals as of 13 October 2023

Bálint Katona (born 7 September 2002) is a Hungarian professional footballer, who plays as a midfielder for Nemzeti Bajnokság I club Nyíregyháza. He represented Hungary at youth level.

== Career ==
After seven years, he left Ferencváros and went on to sign a three-year deal with Nemzeti Bajnokság I side Nyíregyháza on 14 August 2025.

== Personal life ==
Katona is the younger brother of professional footballer Mátyás Katona.

== Career statistics ==
As of match played 26 September 2025

Appearances and goals by club, season and competition
Club	Season	League			Magyar Kupa		Europe		Total	
Club	Season	Division	Apps	Goals	Apps	Goals	Apps	Goals	Apps	Goals
Ferencváros II	2020–21	Nemzeti Bajnokság III	23	4	—		—		23	4
Ferencváros II	2023–24	Nemzeti Bajnokság III	2	2	—		—		2	2
Ferencváros II	Total		25	6	—		—		25	6
Ferencváros	2020–21	Nemzeti Bajnokság I	—		2	1	—		2	1
Ferencváros	2023–24	Nemzeti Bajnokság I	12	0	0	0	4 (Note: Appearances in UEFA Europa Conference League)	0	16	0
Ferencváros	2024–25	Nemzeti Bajnokság I	0	0	—		1 (Note: Appearance in UEFA Champions League)	0	1	0
Ferencváros	Total		12	0	2	1	5	0	19	1
Kecskemét (loan)	2021–22	Nemzeti Bajnokság II	33	5	1	0	—		34	5
Kecskemét (loan)	2022–23	Nemzeti Bajnokság I	33	8	1	0	—		34	8
Kecskemét (loan)	2024–25	Nemzeti Bajnokság I	24	3	2	1	—		26	4
Kecskemét (loan)	Total		90	16	4	1	—		94	17
Kecskemét II (loan)	2022–23	Nemzeti Bajnokság III	1	0	—		—		1	0
Nyíregyháza	2025–26	Nemzeti Bajnokság I	5	0	1	0	—		6	0
Career total			133	22	7	2	5	0	145	24

== Honours ==
Ferencváros

- Nemzeti Bajnokság I: 2023–24
- Magyar Kupa runner-up: 2023–24
