= Barna Benczenleitner =

Hungarian footballer (born 2003)

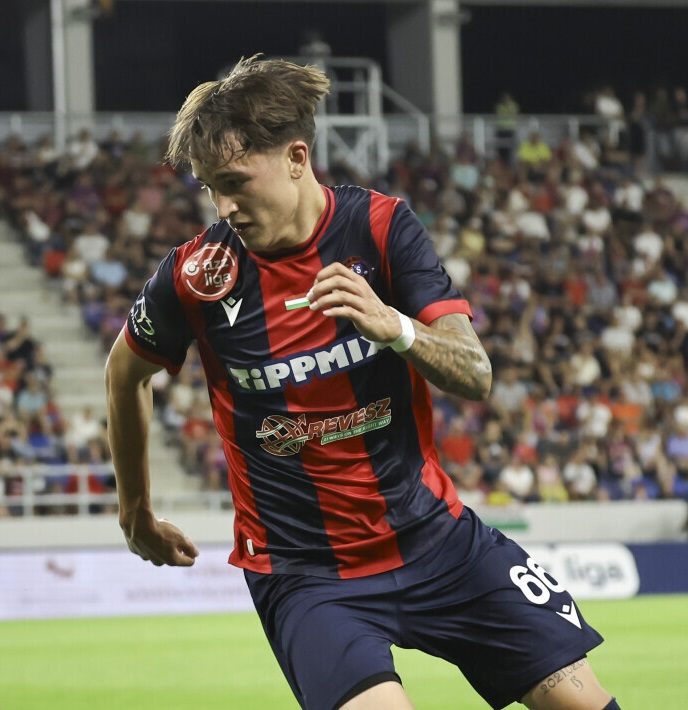
- Benczenleitner playing for Nyíregyháza in 2025

Personal information
- Date of birth: 16 September 2003 (age 23)
- Place of birth: Szombathely, Hungary
- Height: 1.86 m (6 ft 1 in)
- Position: Defender

Team information
- Current team: Nyíregyháza
- Number: 66

Youth career
- 2009: Gloriett
- 2009–2011: Levegő-Energia Hungary
- 2011–2017: Ferencváros
- 2017–2021: Honvéd

Senior career*
Years	Team	Apps	(Gls)
2020–2023	Honvéd II	56	(6)
2020–2025	Honvéd	51	(2)
2022	→ Siófok (loan)	4	(0)
2022–2023	→ Győr (loan)	18	(2)
2025–	Nyíregyháza	32	(2)

International career^{‡}
2018–2019	Hungary U16	6	(0)
2019–2020	Hungary U17	4	(0)
2021–2022	Hungary U19	7	(1)
2022–2024	Hungary U21	18	(0)
- * Club domestic league appearances and goals as of 30 May 2026 ‡ National team caps and goals as of 15 October 2024

Barna Benczenleitner (born 16 September 2003) is a Hungarian professional footballer who plays as a defender for Nemzeti Bajnokság I club Nyíregyháza.

== Career ==
Benczenleitner joined Honvéd in 2017. On 21 October 2021, he signed a contract with the club lasting until 2024, which included an option for extension.

On 7 January 2025, Benczenleitner joined Nemzeti Bajnokság I club Nyíregyháza on a three-year contract.

== Career statistics ==
As of match played 19 January 2026

Appearances and goals by club, season and competition
Club	Season	League			Magyar Kupa		Total	
Club	Season	Division	Apps	Goals	Apps	Goals	Apps	Goals
Honvéd II	2020–21	Nemzeti Bajnokság III	22	4	—		22	4
Honvéd II	2021–22	Nemzeti Bajnokság III	29	2	—		29	2
Honvéd II	2022–23	Nemzeti Bajnokság III	5	0	—		5	0
Honvéd II	Total		56	6	—		56	6
Honvéd	2020–21	Nemzeti Bajnokság I	0	0	—		0	0
Honvéd	2021–22	Nemzeti Bajnokság I	0	0	0	0	0	0
Honvéd	2022–23	Nemzeti Bajnokság I	4	0	0	0	4	0
Honvéd	2023–24	Nemzeti Bajnokság II	32	2	2	0	34	2
Honvéd	2024–25	Nemzeti Bajnokság II	15	0	1	0	16	0
Honvéd	Total		51	2	3	0	54	2
Siófok (loan)	2021–22	Nemzeti Bajnokság II	4	0	—		4	0
Győr (loan)	2022–23	Nemzeti Bajnokság II	18	2	0	0	18	2
Nyíregyháza	2024–25	Nemzeti Bajnokság I	10	0	2	0	12	0
Nyíregyháza	2025–26	Nemzeti Bajnokság I	12	2	2	0	14	2
Nyíregyháza	Total		22	2	4	0	26	2
Career total			151	12	7	0	158	12
