= Attila Temesvári =

Hungarian footballer (born 2000)

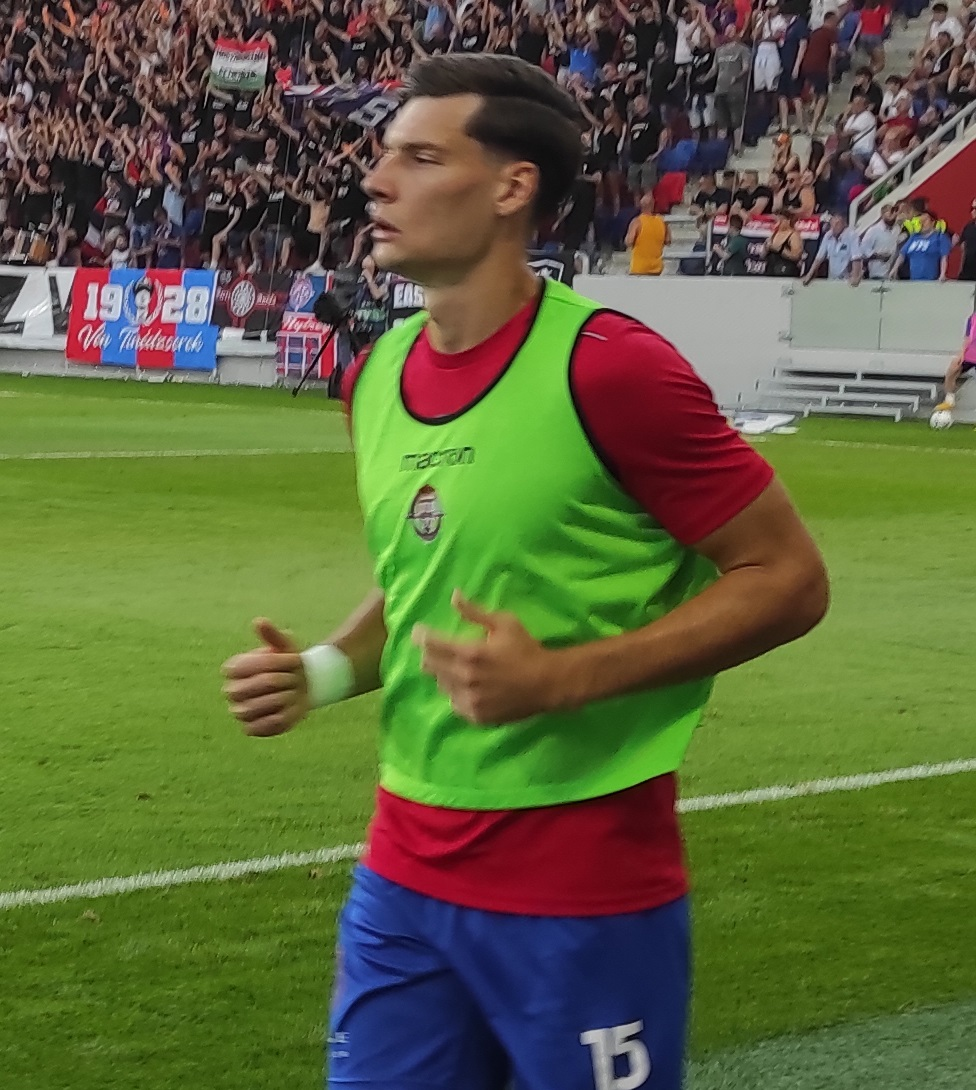
- Temesvári with Nyíregyháza in 2024

Personal information
- Date of birth: 3 June 2000 (age 26)
- Place of birth: Budapest, Hungary
- Height: 2.00 m (6 ft 7 in)
- Position: Defender

Team information
- Current team: Nyíregyháza
- Number: 15

Youth career
- 2006–2010: Budatétény
- 2010–2014: Vasas
- 2014–2019: Honvéd

Senior career*
Years	Team	Apps	(Gls)
2018–2021	Honvéd II	35	(1)
2018–2021	Honvéd	0	(0)
2020	→ Tiszakécske (loan)	6	(0)
2020–2021	→ Győr (loan)	34	(1)
2020–2021	→ Győr II (loan)	3	(0)
2021–2023	Szeged	54	(7)
2023–2024	Paks	2	(0)
2023	Paks II	6	(1)
2024–	Nyíregyháza	46	(5)
2024–	Nyíregyháza II	5	(1)

International career
2016	Hungary U17	1	(0)
2017–2018	Hungary U18	5	(1)
2019	Hungary U19	2	(0)
- * Club domestic league appearances and goals as of 30 May 2026

Attila Temesvári (born 3 June 2000) is a Hungarian professional footballer who plays as a defender for Nemzeti Bajnokság I club Nyíregyháza.

== Personal life ==
Temesvári comes from a footballing family. His grandfather, Miklós Temesvári, was a manager who led Nyíregyháza to its first-ever promotion to the Hungarian top flight in 1980, while Temesvári later achieved a similar promotion as a player. His father, also named Miklós Temesvári, is a former professional footballer.

== Career statistics ==
=== Club ===
As of match played 1 March 2026

Appearances and goals by club, season and competition
Club	Season	League			Magyar Kupa		Total	
Club	Season	Division	Apps	Goals	Apps	Goals	Apps	Goals
Honvéd II	2018–19	Nemzeti Bajnokság III	20	1	—		20	1
Honvéd II	2019–20	Nemzeti Bajnokság III	15	0	—		15	0
Honvéd II	Total		35	1	—		35	1
Honvéd	2018–19	Nemzeti Bajnokság I	0	0	2	0	2	0
Tiszakécske (loan)	2019–20	Nemzeti Bajnokság II	6	0	—		6	0
Győr (loan)	2020–21	Nemzeti Bajnokság II	34	1	1	1	35	2
Győr II (loan)	2020–21	Megyei Bajnokság I	3	0	—		3	0
Szeged	2021–22	Nemzeti Bajnokság II	33	3	1	0	34	3
Szeged	2022–23	Nemzeti Bajnokság II	21	4	1	0	22	4
Szeged	Total		54	7	2	0	56	7
Paks	2023–24	Nemzeti Bajnokság I	2	0	2	0	4	0
Paks II	2023–24	Nemzeti Bajnokság III	6	1	—		6	1
Nyíregyháza	2023–24	Nemzeti Bajnokság II	8	1	2	1	10	2
Nyíregyháza	2024–25	Nemzeti Bajnokság I	12	0	3	0	15	0
Nyíregyháza	2025–26	Nemzeti Bajnokság I	18	2	—		18	2
Nyíregyháza	Total		38	3	5	1	43	4
Nyíregyháza II	2024–25	Nemzeti Bajnokság III	3	1	—		3	1
Nyíregyháza II	2025–26	Nemzeti Bajnokság III	2	0	—		2	0
Nyíregyháza II	Total		5	1	—		5	1
Career total			183	14	12	2	195	16

=== International ===
Appearances and goals by national team and year
Team	Year	Total	
Team	Year	Apps	Goals
Hungary U17	2016	1	0
Hungary U18	2017	2	1
Hungary U18	2018	3	0
Hungary U18	Total	5	1
Hungary U19	2019	2	0
Career total		8	1

Scores and results list Hungary's goal tally first, score column indicates score after each Temesvári goal.

All youth international goals scored by Attila Temesvári
No.	Team	Cap	Date	Venue	Opponent	Score	Result	Competition
1	Hungary U18	2	26 August 2017		Slovakia U18	2–0	4–0	Václav Ježek Tournament

== Honours ==
Győr II

- Megyei Bajnokság I – Győr–Moson–Sopron: 2020–21

Nyíregyháza

- Nemzeti Bajnokság II: 2023–24
