= Balázs Manner =

Hungarian footballer (born 2005)

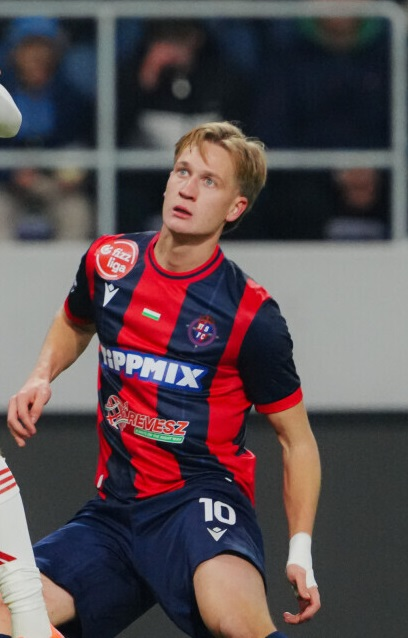
- Manner playing for Nyíregyháza in 2025

Personal information
- Date of birth: 26 April 2005 (age 21)
- Place of birth: Mór, Hungary
- Height: 1.81 m (5 ft 11 in)
- Position: Midfielder

Team information
- Current team: Nyíregyháza
- Number: 10

Youth career
- 2011–2013: Móri
- 2013–2022: Ferencváros

Senior career*
Years	Team	Apps	(Gls)
2022–2025	Ferencváros	0	(0)
2022–2025	→ Ferencváros II	20	(3)
2025–	Nyíregyháza	25	(3)

International career^{‡}
2022–	Hungary U18	3	(0)
- * Club domestic league appearances and goals as of 30 May 2026 ‡ National team caps and goals as of 23:00, 5 July 2023 (UTC)

Balázs Manner (born 26 April 2005) is a Hungarian professional footballer who plays as a midfielder for Nyíregyháza.

== Club career ==
Manner began his career in 2011, starting at hometown club Móri. In September 2013, Manner joined Ferencváros. In December 2022, Manner signed his first professional contract with Ferencváros. On 16 March 2023, Manner made his professional debut for Ferencváros, coming on as a 78th-minute substitute in a 2–0 loss in the UEFA Europa League against Bayer Leverkusen.

On 2 July 2025, Manner signed a three-year contract with Nyíregyháza.

== International career ==
On 10 August 2022, Manner made his debut for Hungary's under-18 side in a 1–0 loss against Slovakia.
