= Marko Kvasina =

Austrian footballer

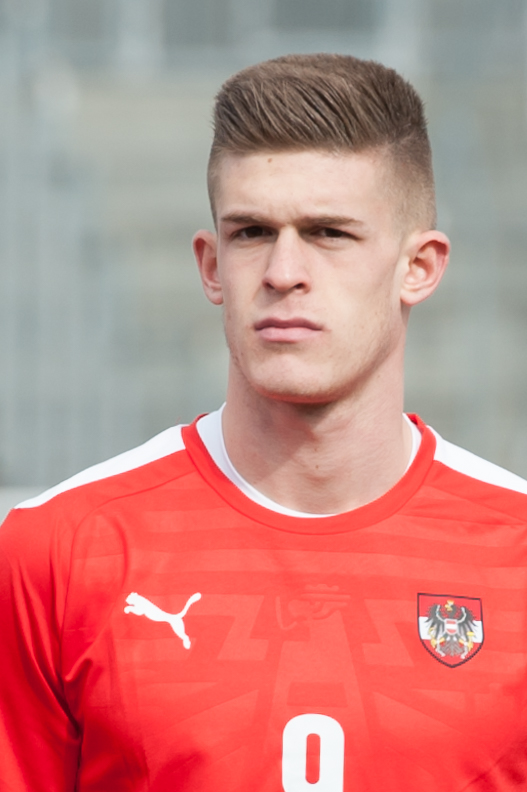

Personal information
- Date of birth: 20 December 1996 (age 29)
- Place of birth: Vienna, Austria
- Height: 1.94 m (6 ft 4 1/2 in)
- Position: Forward

Team information
- Current team: Nyíregyháza
- Number: 9

Youth career
- –2011: First Vienna
- 2011–2014: Austria Wien

Senior career*
Years	Team	Apps	(Gls)
2014–2017	Austria Wien II	55	(23)
2014–2017	Austria Wien	26	(3)
2017–2018	Twente	13	(0)
2018–2020	SV Mattersburg	44	(8)
2020–2022	Oostende	44	(5)
2022	→ Luzern (loan)	14	(2)
2022–2023	Göztepe	30	(2)
2023–2026	Slovácko	50	(4)
2026–	Nyíregyháza	15	(7)

International career
2013	Austria U17	5	(1)
2014	Austria U18	2	(0)
2014–2015	Austria U19	10	(8)
2015–2019	Austria U21	27	(4)
- * Club domestic league appearances and goals as of 30 May 2026

Marko Kvasina (born 20 December 1996) is an Austrian professional footballer who plays as a forward for Hungarian Nemzeti Bajnokság I club Nyíregyháza. He is of Croatian descent.

== Club career ==
In July 2017, he joined Twente in the Netherlands. On 20 December 2023, Kvasina signed a contract until June 2026 with Czech First League club Slovácko.

== International career ==
He represented Austria in the 2013 FIFA U-17 World Cup, 2015 UEFA European Under-19 Championship and the 2019 UEFA European Under-21 Championship.
