= Yuriy Toma =

Ukrainian footballer (born 1996)

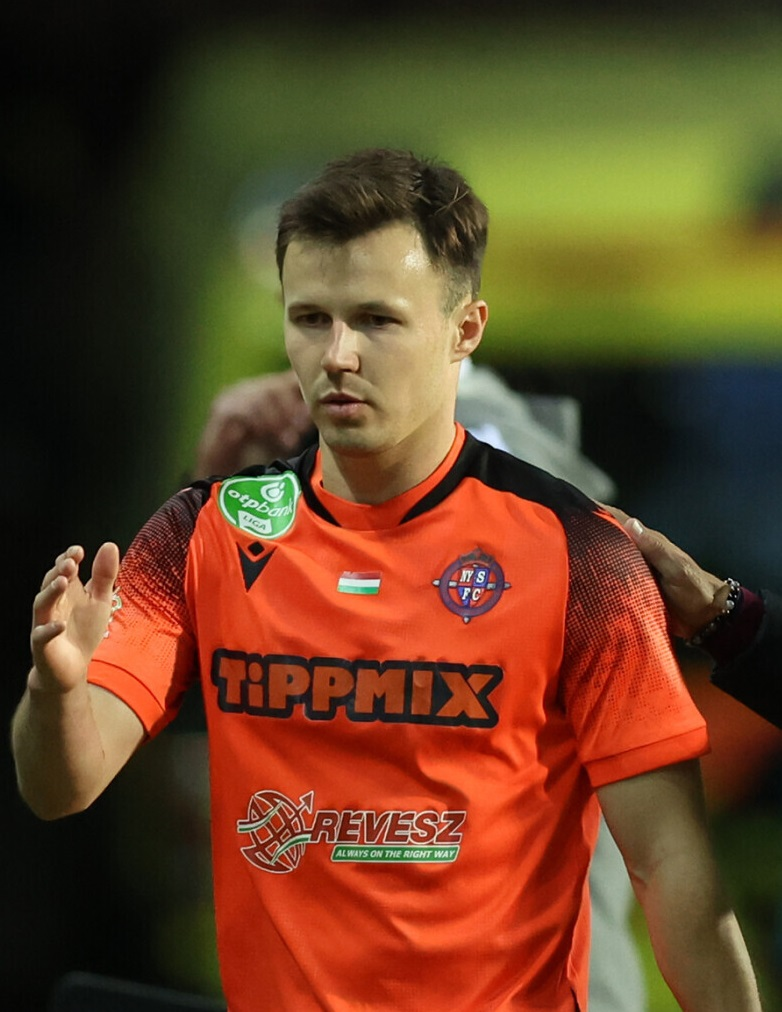
- Toma playing for Nyíregyháza in 2025

Personal information
- Full name: Yuriy Yuriyovych Toma
- Date of birth: 27 April 1996 (age 30)
- Place of birth: Khust, Ukraine
- Height: 1.78 m (5 ft 10 in)
- Position: Midfielder

Team information
- Current team: Nyíregyháza
- Number: 6

Youth career
- 2009–2013: Munkach Mukachevo

Senior career*
Years	Team	Apps	(Gls)
2013–2016	Hoverla Uzhhorod	7	(0)
2016	Munkach Mukachevo (amateurs)	4	(1)
2016–2018	Várda	3	(0)
2017–2018	→ Cigánd (loan)	0	(0)
2018–2021	Kazincbarcikai	88	(6)
2021–2023	Győri ETO	63	(4)
2023–	Nyíregyháza	68	(1)

International career
2018–	Kárpátalja	6	(2)
- * Club domestic league appearances and goals as of 30 May 2026

Yuriy Yuriyovych Toma (Ukrainian: Юрій Юрійович Тома; born 27 April 1996), also known as György Toma, is a Ukrainian footballer who plays as a midfielder for Hungarian club Nyíregyháza.

== Career ==
Toma is a product of the Mukacheve Youth Sportive School System. In 2013, he signed a contract with FC Hoverla, but played only in the FC Hoverla Uzhhorod reserves. In the main-team squad Toma made his debut playing as a substitute in the match against FC Dynamo Kyiv on 4 May 2015 in the Ukrainian Premier League.

== International career ==
In 2018, he appeared for the Kárpátalja football team in the 2018 ConIFA World Football Cup in London. He scored twice in the semi-final against fellow Hungarian diaspora team Székely Land, and scored a penalty in the final shootout vs Northern Cyprus to help Kárpátalja to their first title.
