= István Szabó (footballer, born 1967) =

Hungarian football manager

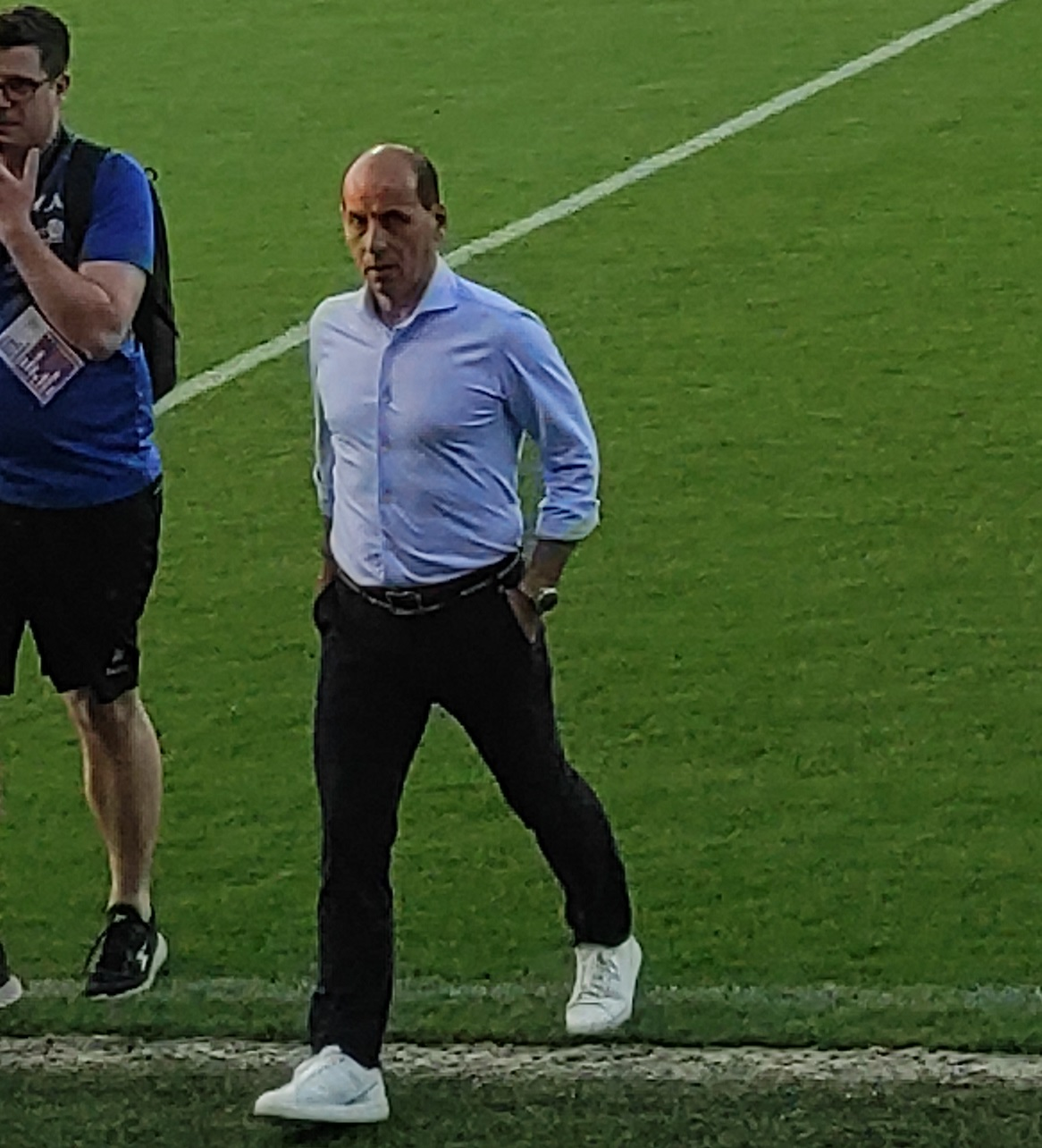
- Szabó with Kecskemét in 2023

Personal information
- Full name: István László Szabó
- Date of birth: 17 January 1967 (age 59)
- Place of birth: Kecskemét, Hungary
- Position: Midfielder

Youth career
- Kecskemét

Senior career*
Years	Team	Apps	(Gls)
1984–1987	Kecskemét		
1987–1992	Helvéciai MEDOSZ		
1992–1993	Kecskemét SC		
1993–1998	Lajosmizse		
1998–1999	Kerekegyháza		
1999–2001	Hetényegyháza		

Managerial career
- 2008–2010: Kecskemét U19
- 2010: Kecskemét (caretaker)
- 2011–2012: Kecskemét
- 2012: Kecskemét (assistant)
- 2012: Kecskemét (caretaker)
- 2012–2013: Paks (fitness coach)
- 2014–2015: Cegléd
- 2016: Kiskunfélegyházi
- 2017–2019: Tiszakécske
- 2020–2021: Dabas
- 2021–2024: Kecskemét
- 2025: Nyíregyháza
- 2026: FK Csíkszereda
- * Club domestic league appearances and goals

István László Szabó (born 17 January 1967) is a Hungarian professional football manager and former player.

== Managerial career ==
=== Kecskemét ===
In 2021, he was appointed as the manager of Kecskeméti TE.

In the 2021–22 Nemzeti Bajnokság II, Kecskemét finished second and were promoted to the first division.

On 15 October 2024, he was sacked as the manager of Kecskeméti TE. After his removal from his position, the supporters of the club organized a protest. He was replaced by former Hungarian national team player, Zoltán Gera.

=== Nyíregyháza ===
On 8 April 2025, he was appointed as the manager of Nemzeti Bajnokság I club Nyíregyháza Spartacus FC. He debuted with a 1-0 victory over Fehérvár FC at the Városi Stadion in Nyíregyháza. However, on 20 April 2025, Ferencvárosi TC beat Nyíregyháza 7–0 at the Ferencváros Stadion, in Budapest. Five days later, on 25 April 2025, Szabó's team managed to beat Debreceni VSC at home 1-0.

=== Csíkszereda ===
On 3 June 2026, he was appointed as the manager of Liga I club FK Csíkszereda.

== Honours ==
=== Coach ===
Kecskemét

- Ligakupa runner-up: 2011–12

Tiszakécske

- Nemzeti Bajnokság III: 2017–18
