= Tamás Bódog =

Hungarian footballer and manager

Personal information
- Date of birth: 27 September 1970 (age 56)
- Place of birth: Dunaújváros, Hungary
- Height: 1.89 m (6 ft 2 in)
- Position: Defender

Team information
- Current team: Nyíregyháza Spartacus FC

Youth career
- Pécsi Mecsek FC

Senior career*
Years	Team	Apps	(Gls)
1989–1994	Pécsi Mecsek FC	77	(2)
1994–2000	SSV Ulm	142	(18)
2000	SpVgg Au/Iller	5	(0)
2001–2006	Mainz 05	92	(7)
2006–2009	Mainz 05 II	1	(0)
Total		317	(27)

International career
2000–2003	Hungary	5	(0)

Managerial career
- 2007–2009: Mainz 05 II (assistant)
- 2009–2010: Videoton FC (assistant)
- 2012–2016: RB Leipzig (assistant)
- 2016–2017: Brøndby IF (assistant)
- 2017–2018: Diósgyőr
- 2020: Kisvárda
- 2020: Honvéd
- 2022–2024: Hertha BSC (assistant)
- 2025: OB (assistant)
- 2025–: Nyíregyháza
- * Club domestic league appearances and goals as of 14 June 2025

Tamás Bódog (born 27 September 1970) is a retired Hungarian international football player and current coach. He is currently head coach of Hungarian Nyíregyháza Spartacus FC.

== International career ==
He made his debut for Hungary national team in 2000 when he played in the Bundesliga for 1. FSV Mainz 05.

== Managerial career ==
On 9 March 2017, he was appointed as the manager of Diósgyőri VTK. On 23 April 2018, he was sacked from Diósgyőr.

=== Kisvárda ===
In 2020 he was appointed as the manager of the Nemzeti Bajnokság I club Kisvárda FC.

=== Nyíregyháza ===
On 29 October 2025, he was appointed as the manager of Nyíregyháza Spartacus FC. He debuted in the 2025–26 Nemzeti Bajnokság I season with a goalless draw against his former club, Kisvárda, at the Várkerti Stadion on 31 October 2025.
