= Nyíregyháza Spartacus FC =

Hungarian football club

Nyíregyháza Spartacus
- Full name: Nyíregyháza Spartacus Football Club
- Nickname: Szpari
- Founded: 1928; 98 years ago
- Ground: Városi Stadion, Nyíregyháza
- Capacity: 10,500
- Chairman: Bálint Révész
- Manager: Tamás Bódog
- League: NB I
- 2025–26: NB I, 9th of 12
- Website: nyiregyhazaspartacus.hu
Home colours	Away colours

Nyíregyháza Spartacus is a professional football club from Nyíregyháza, Hungary. Formed in 1928, it has had brief stints in the Nemzeti Bajnokság III. It set to play in the Nemzeti Bajnokság I from 2024–25 after promotion from Nemzeti Bajnokság II in 2023–24. The team is locally referred to by its monicker, Szpari. Its games take place in Városi Stadion, in the city sport complex just north of the downtown.

== History ==
=== 1920s ===
Nyíregyháza played their first season in the second division of the Eastern Football Association of Szabolcsi group of the 1928–29 season. The club finished in the fourth place. In the following season, the club finished in the third place, playing only four matches against the two opponents: Mátészalkai Tűzoltók SE and Nyíregyházi MTK.

=== 1930s ===
Nyíregyháza won the 1934–35 season of the Keletmagyarországi LASZ, and therefore were promoted to the second division. However, in the 1937–38 season, won by Debreceni VSC, they were relegated to the third division.

=== 1960s ===
The team was refounded in 1959 by the fusion of the clubs Spartacus and Építők. In the early 1960s, the team entered the second division of Hungarian football and then the now non-existent NB I./B, a sub-division of the first division. These were the years of the so-called "golden team" featuring players such Bakos, Pilcsuk, Kovacsics, Páll Cini, Papp Szuszka, Szokol, Kaskötő, Ignéczi, Nagy Zoli, Harcsa, Groholy, and Csemiczky. The team, however, fell from the NB I./B in 1968, ending the golden age.

=== 1980s ===
Nyíregyháza won the 1979-80 Nemzeti Bajnokság II season and were promoted to the first division the first time in the club's history. The club won 22 matches, drew nine times, and lost only seven matches.

In their first season of the Nemzeti Bajnokság I, ( 1980–81 Nemzeti Bajnokság I) the club finished seventh, winning 11 matches, drawing 16 times and losing only seven times.

In 1980, the team finally ascended to the NB I. Their first match in the first division was played against Diósgyőri VTK, soon-to-be rivals from nearby Miskolc. The first goal was scored by Kozma "Kicsi" and Szpari won the match 2–0. The team finished the season in 7th place. However, the team was never able to improve from that season and they were relegated at the end of the 1983–84 season.

=== 1990s ===
The team finally returned to the NB I. in 1998–99 and ended that season in 13th place. They finished 9th in 1999–00, but the league shrank in the 2000–01 season, ultimately only allowing 12 teams to compete and Szpari again exited the first division.

=== 2000s ===
In the 2004–05 season, the league expanded to again allow 16 teams and Nyíregyháza again found themselves in the first division. Though there were a few highlights including a masterful win over a declining Ferencváros to a home crowd in the second half of the season, the team ended in 15th place and were relegated yet again to NB II.

The team had an unsuccessful first campaign upon returning to the NB II, finishing in sixth place overall at the end of the 2005–06 season. Next season they made a stronger case for themselves, spending most of the season challenging Ferencváros at the top of the NB II table. On the occasions they faced each other the perennial Hungarian league favorites could only draw, 0–0 in Nyíregyháza and 1–1 to a crowd of over 13,000 in Budapest. With two matches left in the season the two teams were tied in the standings, but Nyíregyháza ended triumphant, winning the 2006–07 NB II Eastern division outright.

Nyíregyháza spent four consecutive season in the second tier of the Hungarian football league system. In the 2000–01 season, the club finished third and thus were not promoted. In the 2001–02 season, the club finished 7th. In the 2002–03 season, Nyíregyháza was the fifth.

Nyíregyháza finished fifth in the 2003–04 Nemzeti Bajnokság II season and were promoted to the first division since the number of clubs in the first division was expanded.

In the 2004–05 Nemzeti Bajnokság I season, Nyíregyháza finished 15th and were relegated to the second tier. The cub could precede only Békéscsaba 1912 Előre in the championship. The club could win only five matches and drew 11 times. However, the club were defeated 15 times during the season, collecting only 26 points.

Nyíregyháza won the 2006–07 Nemzeti Bajnokság II season preceding Ferencvárosi TC and Orosháza FC. The club 20 matches, drew nine times, and lost only one match during the season.

In the 2009–10 Nemzeti Bajnokság I season, the club finished 15th preceding only Diósgyőri VTK and thus were relegated to the second division. The club could win only six matches and drew nine times, and lost 15 times during the season.

=== 2010s ===
Nyíregyháza won the 2013–14 Nemzeti Bajnokság II and were promoted to the Nemzeti Bajnokság I. Nyíregyháza beat Kisvárda 1–0 away with the goal of Péter Bajzát in the 4th minute. Nyíregyháza preceded Dunaújváros PASE, Gyirmót FC Győr, and Vasas SC in the championship.

In 2015, János Brekk, sports director of the club, announced that the club launches a reserves team in the Megyei Bajnokság I. In the 2014–15 Nemzeti Bajnokság I season, the club finished 12th among 16 teams, preceding Budapest Honvéd FC, Szombathelyi Haladás, Dunaújváros PASE, and Lombard-Pápa TFC. However, the club were relegated because did not receive license from the Hungarian Football Federation. In the following season, Nyíregyháza played in the 2015–16 Nemzeti Bajnokság III, the third tier of the Hungarian football league system. Nyíregyháza won the championship and were promoted to the Nemzeti Bajnokság II. However, the club could not get promoted to the first division ever since.

=== 2020s ===
In the 2020-21 Nemzeti Bajnokság II, the club finished in the seventh position. The champions, Debrecen, could collect 23 more points, while the second club, Gyirmót, 21 more points. In the 2021–22 Nemzeti Bajnokság II, Nyíregyháza finished in the 10th position.

On 12 December 2022, Tivadar Fekete was appointed as the sports director of the club.

On 15 December 2022, Ede Višinka was appointed as the new coach of the club. However, after 8 matches Visinka was removed by mutual consent. In the 2022–23 Nemzeti Bajnokság II season, Nyíregyháza was struggling to avoid relegation with Békéscsaba 1912 Előre and Szentlőrinci SE. Finally, Nyíregyháza finished the 18th in the season, while Békéscsaba 1912 Előre and Dorogi FC were relegated. However, the club had the face the relegation play-offs. On 28 May 2023, Nyíregyháza drew with FC Veszprém at the Városi Stadion in the first leg of the relegation play-offs of the 2022–23 Nemzeti Bajnokság II season.

In the 2023–24 Nemzeti Bajnokság II season, Nyíregyháza beat Aqvital FC Csákvár 7–1 at the Tersztyánszky Ödön Sportközpont in Csákvár on 26 November 2023. In the winter break, Nyíregyháza was on the top of table of the 2023–24 Nemzeti Bajnokság II season.

In the 2023–24 Magyar Kupa season, Nyíregyháza beat FC Tiszaújváros in the 3rd round on 17 September 2023. In the 4th round, Nyírehgyháza beat 1–0 Dunaföldvár on 1 November 2023. In the round of 16, Nyíregyáza beat Szentlőrinci SE 5–1 in Szentlőrinc on 28 February 2024. In the quarter-finals, Nyíregyháza beat Nemzeti Bajnokság I club Kecskeméti TE 2–1 at Balmazújvárosi Városi Sportpálya on 4 April 2024. This victory was a historic moment since Nyíregyháza has never reached the semi-finals of the Magyar Kupa in their history. On 4 April 2024, the draw of the semi-finals took place and Nyíregyháza would face Ferencváros in the semi-finals.

On 5 May 2024, Nyíregyháza won the 2023–24 Nemzeti Bajnokság II season and were promoted to the top flight. On the 31st match day, Nyíregyháza beat Gyirmót FC Győr 3–1 at the Balmazújvárosi Városi Sportpálya.

On 25 August 2024, Nyíregyháza hosted Fehérvár on the 5th match day of the 2024–25 Nemzeti Bajnokság I to open their new stadium. On 21 September 2024, Nyíregyháza beat Debreceni VSC 3–2 at home in the Nemzeti Bajnokás I in front of 8,000 spectators setting a new record of attendance. On 28 September 2024, Nyíregyháza a match for the first time away against Kecskeméti TE at the Széktói Stadion.

In the 2024–25 Nemzeti Bajnokság I, Nyíregyháza were fighting for avoiding relegation to the second division. On 7 April 2025, Nyíregyháza sacked their manager Krisztián Tímár. On 8 April 2025, István Szabó was appointed as the new manager of the club. On the 31st round, Nyíregyháza beat their arch-rival Diósgyőr 1–0 at home. On the penultimate round, Nyíregyháza secured their membership of the first division by a draw against Újpest FC at the Szusza Ferenc Stadion on 16 May 2025. In the 2024–25 Magyar Kupa, Nyíregyháza beat Puskás Akadémia 1–0 at home in the round of 16, on 25 February 2025. Nyíregyháza were eliminated in the quarter-finals by Zalaegerszeg on 1 April 2025.

In the 2025–26 Nemzeti Bajnokság I season, on 17 August 2025, Nyíregyháza beat Debreceni VSC 2-1 at the Nagyerdei Stadion. This victory was the first one in the club's history. Nyíregyháza were beaten by MTK Budapest 5-1 at the Hidegkuti Nándor Stadion on 18 October 2025. On 25 October 2025, Nyíregyháza lost to Kazincbarcika 1-0 at home. On 28 October 2025, István Szabó was sacked. The following day, on 29 October 2025, Tamás Bódog was appointed as the new manager of the club. Bódog debuted with a goalless draw against Kisvárda at the Várkerti Stadion, Kisvárda on 31 October 2025. On 22 November 2025, Nyíregyháza beat Ferencváros at their home stadium for the first time in the club's history. The match ended with a 3-1 victory for Nyíregyháza. The goals were score by Balázs Manner (3rd minute), Márk Kovácsréti (30th minute), and Yuriy Toma (85th minute).

== Colours and badge ==
The colours of the club are red and blue. The two colours were selected from the flag and the coat of arms of Nyíregyháza. The badge contains the initial letters of the club that is Ny, S, F, and C. Since the voiced palatal nasal /ɲ / sound corresponds to the letter ny, the first letter is a digraph in the badge of the club.

== Stadium ==
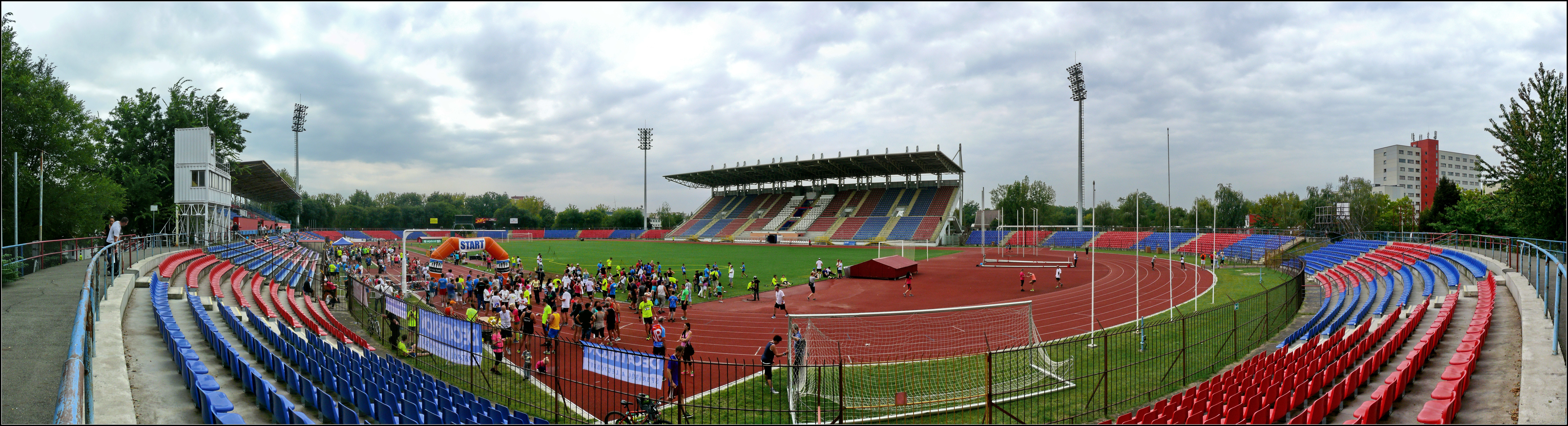
The old stadium was demolished in 2021

Nyíregyháza's first stadium was opened in 1958 and it was demolished in 2021. It was able to hold 10,500 spectators. The first match was played between Nyiregyháza and Eperjes on 27 July 1958. The match ended with a 5-0 victory for the visitors. The highest attendance was recorded on 12 September 1972 when Hungary hosted Czechoslovakia national football team.

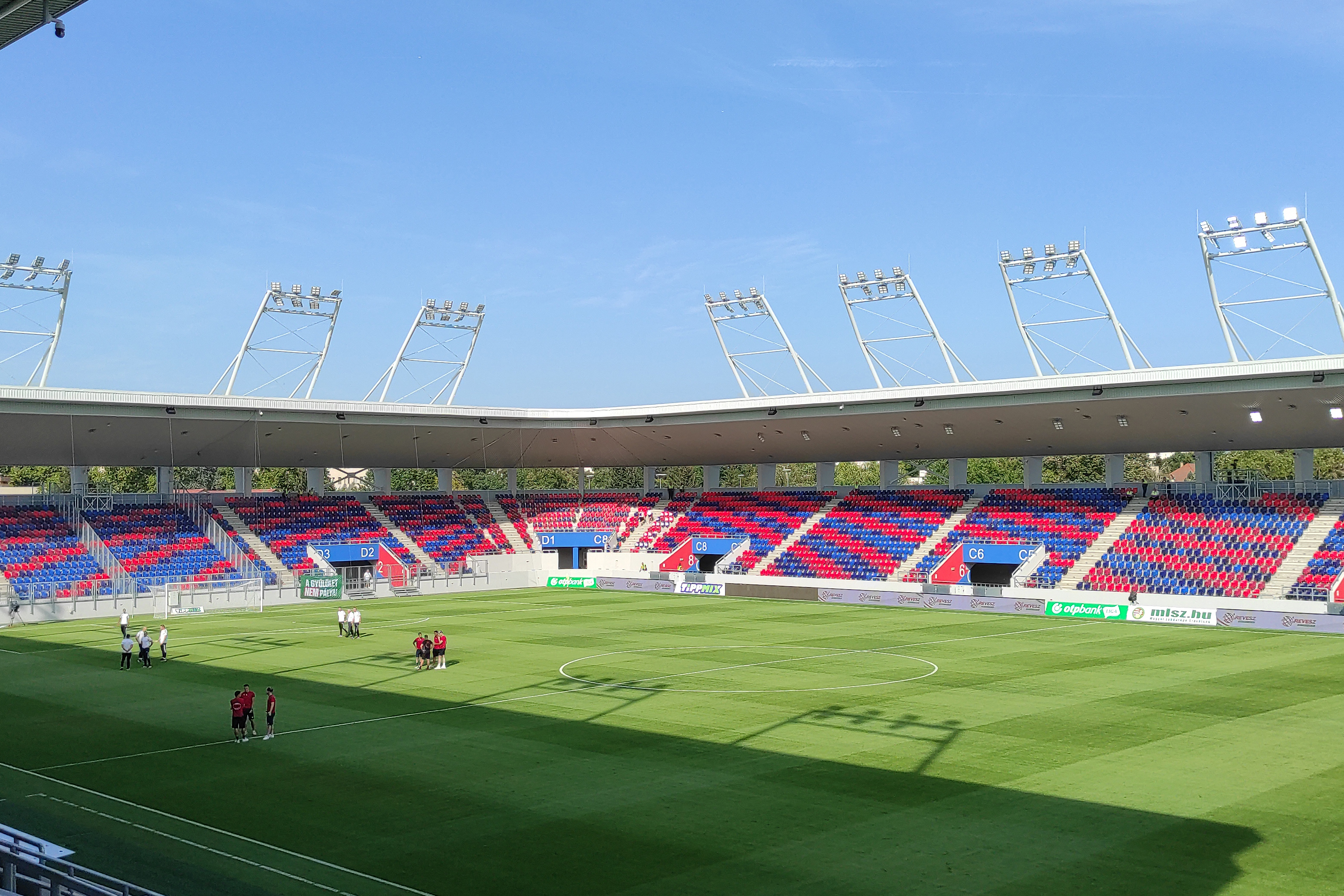
The new stadium

The new stadium was built between 2021 and 2024. It was opened on 25 August 2024 when Nyíregyháza hosted Fehérvár in a 3-3 draw on the 5th game week of the 2024–25 Nemzeti Bajnokság I season. The first goal was scored by Márton Eppel in the 5th minute. After the match, both coaches (Krisztián Tímár and Tamás Pető) said that the atmosphere was enchanting and for this atmosphere it is worth visiting the stadium.

== Supporters ==
The team has several fan groups. The Keleti Front (Eastern Front) began in 1992, The Mastiffs in 1995, and most recently Elit in 2007. The fans have a friendship with Polish fans of Resovia Rzeszów.

== Honours ==
- Nemzeti Bajnokság II:
  - Winners (5): 1979–80, 1997–98, 2006–07, 2013–14, 2023–24
- Nemzeti Bajnokság III:
  - Winners (4): 1940–41, 1949–50, 1959–60, 2015–16

== Seasons ==
=== League positions ===
As of 12 July 2025

- Between 1970–71 and 1973–74 the fifth tier league called Reg.I.
- Between 2001–02 and 2003–04 the second tier league called NB I/B.

== Current squad ==
As of 22 September 2026

Note: Flags indicate national team as defined under FIFA eligibility rules; some limited exceptions apply. Players may hold more than one non-FIFA nationality.

No.	Pos.	Nation	Player
6	MF	UKR	Yuriy Toma
7	DF	SRB	Nemanja Antonov (captain)
8	MF	HUN	Zsombor Hős
9	FW	AUT	Marko Kvasina
10	MF	HUN	Balázs Manner
11	MF	HUN	Milán Májer
12	MF	HUN	Milán Kovács
15	DF	HUN	Attila Temesvári
17	MF	HUN	Csaba Máté
18	MF	CRO	Bojan Sanković
22	GK	HUN	Mátyás Molnár
23	FW	LAT	Marko Regža (on loan from (Czech Republic) Hradec Králové)
24	DF	MKD	Vane Jovanov

No.	Pos.	Nation	Player
25	DF	AUT	Sandro Ingolitsch
26	FW	SLO	Žan Medved
29	FW	CMR	Jean Batoum (on loan from (Poland) Cracovia)
31	DF	HUN	Levente Katona
32	GK	HUN	Balázs Tóth
39	DF	CRO	Rocco Žiković
55	FW	HUN	Bálint Katona
57	GK	HUN	Martin Dala
66	DF	HUN	Barna Benczenleitner
70	MF	HUN	Mátyás Katona
74	DF	HUN	Dominik Kaczvinszki (on loan from (Hungary) Újpest)
77	FW	SVK	Róbert Tarcsi
99	DF	HUN	Áron Alaxai

=== Out on loan ===
Note: Flags indicate national team as defined under FIFA eligibility rules; some limited exceptions apply. Players may hold more than one non-FIFA nationality.

No.	Pos.	Nation	Player
—	DF	HUN	Krisztián Keresztes (on loan at Greuther Fürth)

== See also ==
- List of Nyíregyháza Spartacus FC managers
- List of Nyíregyháza Spartacus FC seasons
