= 2019–20 Kaposvári Rákóczi FC season =

Kaposvári Rákóczi FC
2019–20 season
- Chairman: Ferenc Illés
- Manager: Róbert Waltner
- Stadium: Rákóczi Stadion
- NB 1: 12th (relegated)
- Hungarian Cup: Round of 16
- Top goalscorer: League: Martin Ádám (5); All: Martin Ádám (6)
- Highest home attendance: 4,115 vs Ferencváros (1 December 2019)
- Lowest home attendance: 500 vs Zalaegerszeg (29 May 2020)
Home colours	Away colours

The 2019–20 season will be Kaposvári Rákóczi FC's 1st competitive season, 16th consecutive season in the OTP Bank Liga and 94th year in existence as a football club.

== First team squad ==
As of 14 August 2019

Note: Flags indicate national team as defined under FIFA eligibility rules; some limited exceptions apply. Players may hold more than one non-FIFA nationality.

No.	Pos.	Nation	Player
1	GK	HUN	Krisztián Pogacsics
2	DF	HUN	Marcell Fodor
5	DF	HUN	Alex Szabó
6	DF	HUN	Csaba Vachtler
7	MF	HUN	Norbert Csiki
8	DF	HUN	János Nagy
9	FW	HUN	Gergő Beliczky
10	FW	SVN	Matej Poplatnik (on loan from Kerala Blasters)
11	DF	HUN	Valentin Hadaró
13	MF	HUN	Ákos Borbély
14	FW	HUN	Áron Herzsenyák
15	DF	HUN	Dániel Tratnyek
16	MF	HUN	Attila Szakály

No.	Pos.	Nation	Player
17	DF	HUN	Gergely Tóth
19	FW	ROU	Ervin Zsiga
20	FW	HUN	Tamás Orsós
21	DF	HUN	László Ur
22	MF	HUN	Dávid Hegedűs
23	FW	HUN	Bálint Tömösvári
24	MF	HUN	Krisztián Nagy
30	GK	HUN	Balázs Slokta
66	FW	HUN	Martin Ádám
70	GK	HUN	Márk Bonnyai
80	MF	CRO	Aljoša Vojnović
88	MF	HUN	Richárd Nagy
97	MF	UKR	Andriy Yakymiv

== Transfers ==
=== Summer ===
In: Note: Flags indicate national team as defined under FIFA eligibility rules; some limited exceptions apply. Players may hold more than one non-FIFA nationality.

No.	Pos.	Nation	Player
7	MF	HUN	Norbert Csiki (from Budaörs)
10	FW	SVN	Matej Poplatnik (loan from (India) Kerala)
17	DF	HUN	Gergely Tóth (from Vác)
20	FW	HUN	Tamás Orsós (from Kaposvár U-19)
23	FW	HUN	Bálint Tömösvári (loan from Budapest Honvéd)
80	MF	CRO	Aljoša Vojnović (from Zalaegerszeg)
88	MF	HUN	Richárd Nagy (from Mezőkövesd)
97	MF	UKR	Andriy Yakymiv (from (Ukraine) Desna)

Out: Note: Flags indicate national team as defined under FIFA eligibility rules; some limited exceptions apply. Players may hold more than one non-FIFA nationality.

No.	Pos.	Nation	Player
3	MF	HUN	Rabil Godzajev-Telmán (to Pécs)
7	FW	HUN	Péter Rajczi (to III. Kerület)
14	FW	HUN	Áron Herzsenyák (to Nagykanizsa)
15	DF	HUN	Dániel Tratnyek (loan to Sárvár)
26	FW	HUN	Ferenc Horváth (to Szentlőrinc)
27	MF	HUN	Martin Csernák (to Komárom)
90	DF	HUN	Gergő Lakatos (to Jászberény)

=== Winter ===
In: Note: Flags indicate national team as defined under FIFA eligibility rules; some limited exceptions apply. Players may hold more than one non-FIFA nationality.

No.	Pos.	Nation	Player
9	MF	HUN	Zsombor Bévárdi (loan from Debrecen)
19	FW	HUN	Ádám Pintér (loan from Debrecen)
20	DF	CRO	Antun Palić (from (Moldova) Sheriff Tiraspol)
23	MF	HUN	Aurél Farkas (from Csákvár)
32	MF	LVA	Igors Tarasovs (from (Latvia) Spartaks Jūrmala)
33	MF	CRO	Dinko Trebotić (loan from (Belarus) Dinamo Minsk)
73	GK	HUN	László Laky (from Puskás Akadémia)
94	MF	SRB	Vanja Marković (from (Portugal) Farense)

Out: Note: Flags indicate national team as defined under FIFA eligibility rules; some limited exceptions apply. Players may hold more than one non-FIFA nationality.

No.	Pos.	Nation	Player
9	FW	HUN	Gergő Beliczky (to Siófok)
15	FW	SVN	Matej Poplatnik (loan return to (India) Kerala Blasters)
17	DF	HUN	Gergely Tóth (to Ajka)
19	FW	ROU	Ervin Zsiga
23	FW	HUN	Bálint Tömösvári (loan return to Budapest Honvéd)
80	MF	CRO	Aljoša Vojnović (Retired)
94	MF	SRB	Vanja Marković (to (Georgia (country)) Torpedo Kutaisi)

== Competitions ==
=== Overview ===
Competition	First match	Last match	Starting round	Final position	Record							
Competition	First match	Last match	Starting round	Final position	Pld	W	D	L	GF	GA	GD	Win %
Nemzeti Bajnokság I	4 August 2019	–	Matchday 1	Matchday 33	14	2	0	12	11	29	−18	14.29
Magyar Kupa	21 September 2019	-	Sixth round		3	2	0	1	5	0	+5	66.67
Total					17	4	0	13	16	29	−13	23.53

Last updated: 8 December 2019
Source: Competitions

=== Nemzeti Bajnokság I ===
==== League table ====
Pos	Team	Pld	W	D	L	GF	GA	GD	Pts	Qualification or relegation
8	Kisvárda	33	12	6	15	42	43	−1	42	
9	Diósgyőr	33	12	5	16	40	52	−12	41	
10	Paks	33	11	8	14	46	53	−7	41	
11	Debrecen (R)	33	11	6	16	48	57	−9	39	Relegation to the Nemzeti Bajnokság II
12	Kaposvár (R)	33	4	2	27	27	80	−53	14	Relegation to the Nemzeti Bajnokság II

Source: Hungarian Football Federation (in Hungarian), Soccerway
Rules for classification: 1) Points; 2) Matches won; 3) Goal difference; 4) Goals scored; 5) Head-to-head points; 6) Head-to-head goal difference; 7) Head-to-head away goals scored; 8) Fair play ranking; 9) Drawing of lots.
(R) Relegated

==== Results summary ====
Overall								Home						Away					
Pld	W	D	L	GF	GA	GD	Pts	W	D	L	GF	GA	GD	W	D	L	GF	GA	GD
33	4	2	27	27	80	−53	14	3	1	12	16	35	−19	1	1	15	11	45	−34

Last updated: 27 June 2020.
Source: NB1

==== Results by round ====
Round	1	2	3	4	5	6	7	8	9	10	11	12	13	14	15	16	17	18	19	20	21	22	23	24	25	26	27	28	29	30	31	32	33
Ground	A	H	A	H	A	A	H	A	H	A	H	H	A	H	A	H	H	A	H	A	H	H	A	H	A	H	A	A	H	A	H	A	A
Result	L	L	L	L	W	L	W	L	L	L	L	L	L	L	L	W	D	L	L	L	L	L	L	L	L	L	D	L	W	L	L	L	L
Position	11	11	11	12	11	12	11	12	12	12	12	12	12	12	12	12	12	12	12	12	12	12	12	12	12	12	12	12	12	12	12	12	12

Updated to match(es) played on 27 June 2020. Source: Matches
A = Away; H = Home; W = Win; D = Draw; L = Loss

=== Matches ===
4 August 2019 1	Fehérvár	4 – 2	Kaposvár	Székesfehérvár
18:00 CEST	Futács 5', 62'; Hodžić 16', 40'	Report	Ádám 8', 46'	Stadium: MOL Aréna Sóstó; Attendance: 2,881; Referee: Péter Solymosi

10 August 2019 2	Kaposvár	1 – 2	Mezőkövesd	Kaposvár
17:00 CEST	K. Nagy 12'	Report	D. Nagy 14'; Cseri 30'	Stadium: Rákóczi Stadion; Attendance: 2,950; Referee: Balázs Berke

17 August 2019 3	Ferencváros	1 – 0	Kaposvár	Budapest
19:30 CEST	Zubkov 7'	Report		Stadium: Groupama Arena; Attendance: 6,891; Referee: Zoltán Iványi

24 August 2019 4	Kaposvár	0 – 4	Zalaegerszeg	Kaposvár
18:00 CEST		Report	Radó 32' (pen.); Barczi 34'; Devecseri 83'; Ikoba 90'	Stadium: Rákóczi Stadion; Attendance: 2,410; Referee: Ferenc Karakó

31 August 2019 5	Debrecen	0 – 1	Kaposvár	Debrecen
19:30 CEST		Report	Ádám 9'	Stadium: Nagyerdei Stadion; Attendance: 4,120; Referee: Ádám Pillók

14 September 2019 6	Puskás Akadémia	2 – 0	Kaposvár	Felcsút
17:00 CEST	Vaněček 47', 49'	Report		Stadium: Pancho Aréna; Attendance: 1,022; Referee: Ádám Farkas

28 September 2019 7	Kaposvár	2 – 0	Diósgyőr	Kaposvár
17:00 CEST	T. Nagy 20'; Szakály 54'	Report		Stadium: Rákóczi Stadion; Attendance: 1,100; Referee: Balázs Berke

5 October 2019 8	Paks	2 – 1	Kaposvár	Paks
17:00 CEST	Remili 47'; Windecker 56'	Report	Hegedűs 35'	Stadium: Fehérvári úti Stadion; Attendance: 1,109; Referee: Gergő Bogár

19 October 2019 9	Kaposvár	0 – 2	Kisvárda	Kaposvár
17:00 CEST		Report	Lucas 34'; Gosztonyi 88'	Stadium: Rákóczi Stadion; Attendance: 1,155; Referee: Péter Solymosi

26 October 2019 10	Budapest Honvéd	2 – 0	Kaposvár	Budapest
17:00 CEST	Lanzafame 16' (pen.); Moutari 34'	Report		Stadium: Hidegkuti Nándor Stadion; Attendance: 2,543; Referee: József Erdős

2 November 2019 11	Kaposvár	2 – 3	Újpest	Kaposvár
17:00 CET	Balázs 5'; Ádám 52'	Report	Zsótér 27'; Simon 44'; Nwobodo 49'	Stadium: Rákóczi Stadion; Attendance: 2,072; Referee: Ádám Pillók

9 November 2019 12	Kaposvár	0 – 2	Fehérvár	Kaposvár
17:00 CET		Report	Milanov 3'; Futács 52'	Stadium: Rákóczi Stadion; Attendance: 1,575; Referee: Zoltán Iványi

23 November 2019 13	Mezőkövesd	2 – 0	Kaposvár	Mezőkövesd
17:00 CET	Cseri 45' (pen.); Berecz 47'	Report		Stadium: Városi Stadion; Attendance: 1,452; Referee: Péter Solymosi

1 December 2019 14	Kaposvár	2 – 3	Ferencváros	Kaposvár
18:00 CET	Ádám 11'; Csiki 64'	Report	Isael 13', 32'; Boli 75'	Stadium: Rákóczi Stadion; Attendance: 4,115; Referee: Gergő Bogár

7 December 2019 15	Zalaegerszeg	2 – 0	Kaposvár	Zalaegerszeg
17:00 CET	Ikoba 1'; Lesjak 38'	Report		Stadium: ZTE Arena; Attendance: 1,222; Referee: Csaba Pintér

14 December 2019 16	Kaposvár	4 – 1	Debrecen	Kaposvár
17:00 CET	Balázs 10'; Szatmári 45' (o.g.); R. Nagy 49'; Tömösvári 90'	Report	Adeniji 51'	Stadium: Rákóczi Stadion; Attendance: 1,169; Referee: Tamás Bognár

25 January 2020 17	Kaposvár	1 – 1	Puskás Akadémia	Kaposvár
17:00 CET	R. Nagy 20'	Report	Mebrahtu 15'	Stadium: Rákóczi Stadion; Attendance: 1,053; Referee: József Erdős

1 February 2020 18	Diósgyőr	2 – 0	Kaposvár	Miskolc
17:00 CET	Brković 20'; Fodor 22' (o.g.)	Report		Stadium: Diósgyőri Stadion; Attendance: 3,702; Referee: Péter Solymosi

5 February 2020 19	Kaposvár	0 – 3	Paks	Kaposvár
18:00 CET		Report	Könyves 17', 41'; Sajbán 83'	Stadium: Rákóczi Stadion; Attendance: 690; Referee: Ferenc Karakó

8 February 2020 20	Kisvárda	5 – 3	Kaposvár	Kisvárda
17:00 CET	Melnyk 34'; Tischler 60', 65', 82'; Viana 73'	Report	Hegedűs 31'; J. Nagy 50'; Fodor 70'	Stadium: Várkerti Stadion; Attendance: 1,850; Referee: Bence Csonka

15 February 2020 21	Kaposvár	0 – 1	Budapest Honvéd	Kaposvár
17:00 CET		Report	Lanzafame 6'	Stadium: Rákóczi Stadion; Attendance: 1,310; Referee: Sándor Andó-Szabó

22 February 2020 22	Kaposvár	0 – 1	Újpest	Kaposvár
17:00 CET		Report	Novothny 6' (pen.)	Stadium: Rákóczi Stadion; Attendance: 1,093; Referee: József Erdős

29 February 2020 23	Fehérvár	3 – 0	Kaposvár	Székesfehérvár
17:00 CET	Bamgboye 2'; T. Nagy 21' (o.g.); Nikolić 44'	Report		Stadium: MOL Aréna Sóstó; Attendance: 2,311; Referee: Ádám Farkas

7 March 2020 24	Kaposvár	0 – 4	Mezőkövesd	Kaposvár
17:00 CET		Report	Beširović 32'; Jurina 49'; Cseri 62' (pen.); Zivzivadze 90'	Stadium: Rákóczi Stadion; Attendance: 1,011; Referee: Bence Csonka

14 March 2020 25	Ferencváros	5 – 0	Kaposvár	Budapest
17:00 CET	Boli 38'; Isael 58'; Blažič 73'; Varga 85', 90+2'	Report		Stadium: Groupama Arena; Attendance: x Referee: Péter Solymosi

29 May 2020 26	Kaposvár	0 – 6	Zalaegerszeg	Kaposvár
20:00 CEST		Report	Radó 6', 35'; Bőle 21', 31'; Barczi 28'; Lesjak 52'	Stadium: Rákóczi Stadion; Attendance: 500; Referee: József Erdős

5 June 2020 27	Debrecen	1 – 1	Kaposvár	Debrecen
20:00 CEST	Szabó 6'	Report	Borbély 87'	Stadium: Nagyerdei Stadion; Attendance: 2,400; Referee: Ádám Farkas

10 June 2020 28	Puskás Akadémia	2 – 1	Kaposvár	Felcsút
19:00 CEST	Knežević 8' (pen.); Tamás 90'	Report	Szakály 23'	Stadium: Pancho Aréna; Attendance: 150; Referee: Péter Solymosi

14 June 2020 29	Kaposvár	3 – 0	Diósgyőr	Kaposvár
19:00 CEST	Bévárdi 7'; R. Nagy 48' (pen.); J. Nagy 89'	Report		Stadium: Rákóczi Stadion; Attendance: 850; Referee: Balázs Berke

17 June 2020 30	Paks	3 – 0	Kaposvár	Paks
16:55 CEST	Hahn 21' (pen.); Haraszti 33', 69' (pen.)	Report		Stadium: Fehérvári úti Stadion; Attendance: 600; Referee: Péter Solymosi

21 June 2020 31	Kaposvár	1 – 2	Kisvárda	Kaposvár
19:00 CEST	Bévárdi 35'	Report	Tsoukalas 21'; Kovácsréti 45'	Stadium: Rákóczi Stadion; Attendance: 995; Referee: Ádám Farkas

24 June 2020 32	Budapest Honvéd	4 – 2	Kaposvár	Budapest
19:00 CEST	Gazdag 20', 65'; Hidi 62'; Kukoč 90+4'	Report	Bévárdi 58'; Balázs 83'	Stadium: Hidegkuti Nándor Stadion; Attendance: 1,982; Referee: Péter Antal

27 June 2020 33	Újpest	5 – 0	Kaposvár	Budapest
17:30 CEST	Simon 12'; Novothny 45'; Bacsa 46', 49'; Máté 57'	Report		Stadium: Szusza Ferenc Stadion; Attendance: 3,004; Referee: Bence Csonka

=== Hungarian Cup ===
21 September 2019 6th round	Soltvadkert	0 – 4	Kaposvár	Soltvadkert
15:00 CEST		Report	Balázs 14'; Vachtler 26'; R. Nagy 28'; K. Nagy 75'	Stadium: Soltvadkerti Sporttelep; Attendance: 350; Referee: Zoltán J. Kovács

30 October 2019 7th round	Tiszakécske	0 – 1	Kaposvár	Tiszakécske
18:00 CET		Report	R. Nagy 90+3'	Stadium: Városi Stadion; Attendance: 350; Referee: József Ducsai

11 December 2019 8th round	Ózd	0 – 3	Kaposvár	Ózd
11:00 CET		[ Report]		Stadium: Városi Stadion

12 February 2020 Round of 16 (1st leg)	Mezőkövesd	2 – 1	Kaposvár	Mezőkövesd
18:00 CET	Pillár 82'; Cseri 90+2'	Report	Ádám 66'	Stadium: Mezőkövesdi Városi Stadion; Attendance: 647; Referee: László Lovas

19 February 2020 Round of 16 (2nd leg)	Kaposvár	1 – 3 (2 – 5 agg.)	Mezőkövesd	Kaposvár
18:00 CET	Vachtler 83'	Report	Takács 44'; Jurina 65'; Berecz 78' (pen.)	Stadium: Rákóczi Stadion; Referee: Gergő Bogár

== Statistics ==
=== Appearances and goals ===
Last updated on 27 June 2020.

No.	Pos	Nat	Player	Total		OTP Bank Liga		Hungarian Cup	
No.	Pos	Nat	Player	Apps	Goals	Apps	Goals	Apps	Goals
1	GK	(Hungary) HUN	Krisztián Pogacsics	29	-66	28	-63	1	-3
2	DF	(Hungary) HUN	Marcell Fodor	30	1	27	1	3	0
5	DF	(Hungary) HUN	Alex Szabó	15	0	12	0	3	0
6	DF	(Hungary) HUN	Csaba Vachtler	34	2	31	0	3	2
7	MF	(Hungary) HUN	Norbert Csiki	25	1	25	1	0	0
8	DF	(Hungary) HUN	János Nagy	34	2	33	2	1	0
9	MF	(Hungary) HUN	Zsombor Bévárdi	7	3	7	3	0	0
10	MF	(Hungary) HUN	Dominik Bíró	4	0	3	0	1	0
11	DF	(Hungary) HUN	Valentin Hadaró	19	0	16	0	3	0
13	MF	(Hungary) HUN	Ákos Borbély	15	1	12	1	3	0
14	MF	(Hungary) HUN	Tamás Nagy	24	1	21	1	3	0
16	MF	(Hungary) HUN	Attila Szakály	35	2	31	2	4	0
19	MF	(Hungary) HUN	Ádám Pintér	10	0	10	0	0	0
20	DF	(Croatia) CRO	Antun Palić	11	0	9	0	2	0
21	DF	(Hungary) HUN	László Ur	19	0	17	0	2	0
22	MF	(Hungary) HUN	Dávid Hegedűs	20	2	20	2	0	0
23	MF	(Hungary) HUN	Aurél Farkas	4	0	3	0	1	0
24	MF	(Hungary) HUN	Krisztián Nagy	21	2	17	1	4	1
25	FW	(Hungary) HUN	Zalán Keresztes	2	0	2	0	0	0
30	GK	(Hungary) HUN	Balázs Slakta	10	-16	7	-14	3	-2
32	MF	(Latvia) LVA	Igors Tarasovs	7	0	7	0	0	0
33	MF	(Croatia) CRO	Dinko Trebotić	13	0	11	0	2	0
66	FW	(Hungary) HUN	Martin Ádám	32	6	30	5	2	1
70	GK	(Hungary) HUN	Márk Bonnyai	1	0	1	0	0	0
73	GK	(Hungary) HUN	László Laky	1	-3	1	-3	0	0
88	MF	(Hungary) HUN	Richárd Nagy	33	5	29	3	4	2
92	FW	(Hungary) HUN	Zsolt Balázs	25	4	22	3	3	1
97	MF	(Ukraine) UKR	Andriy Yakymiv	18	0	15	0	3	0
Players no longer at the club:
9	FW	(Hungary) HUN	Gergő Beliczky	14	0	13	0	1	0
15	FW	(Slovenia) SVN	Matej Poplatnik	8	0	6	0	2	0
17	DF	(Hungary) HUN	Gergely Tóth	1	0	0	0	1	0
19	FW	(Romania) ROU	Ervin Zsiga	5	0	5	0	0	0
23	FW	(Hungary) HUN	Bálint Tömösvári	1	1	1	1	0	0
80	MF	(Croatia) CRO	Aljoša Vojnović	3	0	2	0	1	0
94	MF	(Serbia) SRB	Vanja Marković	1	0	1	0	0	0

=== Top scorers ===
Includes all competitive matches. The list is sorted by shirt number when total goals are equal.

Last updated on 27 June 2020

Position	Nation	Number	Name	OTP Bank Liga	Hungarian Cup	Total
1	(Hungary)	66	Martin Ádám	5	1	6
2	(Hungary)	88	Richárd Nagy	3	2	5
3	(Hungary)	92	Zsolt Balázs	3	1	4
4	(Hungary)	9	Zsombor Bévárdi	3	0	3
5	(Hungary)	22	Dávid Hegedűs	2	0	2
6	(Hungary)	16	Attila Szakály	2	0	2
7	(Hungary)	8	János Nagy	2	0	2
8	(Hungary)	24	Krisztián Nagy	1	1	2
9	(Hungary)	6	Csaba Vachtler	0	2	2
10	(Hungary)	14	Tamás Nagy	1	0	1
11	(Hungary)	7	Norbert Csiki	1	0	1
12	(Hungary)	23	Bálint Tömösvári	1	0	1
13	(Hungary)	2	Marcell Fodor	1	0	1
14	(Hungary)	13	Ákos Borbély	1	0	1
/	/	/	Own Goals	1	0	1
			TOTALS	27	7	34

=== Disciplinary record ===
Includes all competitive matches. Players with 1 card or more included only.

Last updated on 27 June 2020

Position	Nation	Number	Name	OTP Bank Liga		Hungarian Cup		Total (Hu Total)	
Position	Nation	Number	Name	Booked	Sent off (straight red)	Booked	Sent off (straight red)	Booked	Sent off (straight red)
GK	(Hungary)	1	Krisztián Pogacsics	1	1	0	0	1 (1)	1 (1)
DF	(Hungary)	2	Marcell Fodor	9	0	0	0	9 (9)	0 (0)
DF	(Hungary)	5	Alex Szabó	1	0	1	0	2 (1)	0 (0)
DF	(Hungary)	6	Csaba Vachtler	7	0	0	0	7 (7)	0 (0)
MF	(Hungary)	7	Norbert Csiki	2	0	0	0	2 (2)	0 (0)
DF	(Hungary)	8	János Nagy	4	0	0	0	4 (4)	0 (0)
FW	(Hungary)	9	Gergő Beliczky	1	0	0	0	1 (1)	0 (0)
MF	(Hungary)	10	Dominik Bíró	0	0	0	1	0 (0)	1 (0)
DF	(Hungary)	11	Valentin Hadaró	1	0	0	1	1 (1)	1 (0)
MF	(Hungary)	13	Ákos Borbély	1	0	1	0	2 (1)	0 (0)
MF	(Hungary)	14	Tamás Nagy	8	0	0	0	8 (8)	0 (0)
FW	(Slovenia)	15	Matej Poplatnik	1	0	0	0	1 (1)	0 (0)
MF	(Hungary)	16	Attila Szakály	8	0	0	0	8 (8)	0 (0)
DF	(Hungary)	21	László Ur	3	0	0	0	3 (3)	0 (0)
MF	(Hungary)	22	Dávid Hegedűs	2	0	0	0	2 (2)	0 (0)
MF	(Hungary)	24	Krisztián Nagy	3	1	0	0	3 (3)	1 (1)
MF	(Latvia)	32	Igors Tarasovs	3	0	0	0	3 (3)	0 (0)
MF	(Croatia)	33	Dinko Trebotić	2	0	0	0	2 (2)	0 (0)
FW	(Hungary)	66	Martin Ádám	8	0	1	0	9 (8)	0 (0)
MF	(Hungary)	88	Richárd Nagy	5	0	0	0	5 (5)	0 (0)
FW	(Hungary)	92	Zsolt Balázs	3	0	0	0	3 (3)	0 (0)
MF	(Ukraine)	97	Andriy Yakymiv	4	0	0	0	4 (4)	0 (0)
			TOTALS	77	2	3	2	80 (77)	4 (2)

=== Overall ===
Games played	38 (33 OTP Bank Liga and 5 Hungarian Cup)
Games won	7 (4 OTP Bank Liga and 3 Hungarian Cup)
Games drawn	2 (2 OTP Bank Liga and 0 Hungarian Cup)
Games lost	29 (27 OTP Bank Liga and 2 Hungarian Cup)
Goals scored	37
Goals conceded	85
Goal difference	-48
Yellow cards	80
Red cards	4
Worst discipline	(Hungary) Marcell Fodor (9 (yellow card) , 0 (red card) )
Worst discipline	(Hungary) Martin Ádám (9 (yellow card) , 0 (red card) )
Best result	4–0 (A) v Soltvadkert - Hungarian Cup - 21-09-2019
Worst result	0–6 (H) v Zalaegerszeg - Nemzeti Bajnokság I - 29-05-2020
Most appearances	(Hungary) Attila Szakály (35 appearances)
Top scorer	(Hungary) Martin Ádám (6 goals)
Points	23/114 (20.17%)

Last updated: 27 June 2020
