= 2022–23 Pécsi MFC season =

Pécs
2022–23 season
- Chairman: János Győr
- Manager: Ádám Weitner
- Stadium: Stadion PMFC
- Nemzeti Bajnokság II: 7th
- Magyar Kupa: Round of 64
- Top goalscorer: League: Kristóf Tóth-Gábor (13); All: Kristóf Tóth-Gábor (13)
Home colours	Away colours

The 2022–23 season is Pécsi Mecsek Football Club's 15th competitive season, 3rd consecutive season in the Nemzeti Bajnokság II and 52nd year in existence as a football club. In addition to the domestic league, Pécs participated in this season's editions of the Magyar Kupa.

== Transfers ==
=== Summer ===
In: Note: Flags indicate national team as defined under FIFA eligibility rules; some limited exceptions apply. Players may hold more than one non-FIFA nationality.

No.	Pos.	Nation	Player
—	MF	HUN	István Harsányi (from Szentlőrinc)
—	MF	HUN	Tamás Szeles (from Diósgyőr)
—	FW	HUN	Kristóf Tóth-Gábor (from Budapest Honvéd)
—	FW	HUN	Gábor Makrai (from Diósgyőr)
—	DF	HUN	Zsombor Takács (from BVSC Budapest)
—	DF	HUN	János Mayer (from Puskás Akadémia II)
—	GK	HUN	Szilveszter Nagy (from Puskás Akadémia II)
—	LW	HUN	Zalán Gera (from Ferencváros II)
—	DF	HUN	Botond Terbe (from Vasas)
—	GK	HUN	Péter Kovács (from Debrecen)
—	MF	HUN	Bence Kocsis (loan from Paks)
—	MF	HUN	Barna Kesztyűs (loan from Paks)
—	DF	HUN	Valentin Hadaró (loan from Kecskemét)

Out: Note: Flags indicate national team as defined under FIFA eligibility rules; some limited exceptions apply. Players may hold more than one non-FIFA nationality.

No.	Pos.	Nation	Player
—	FW	HUN	Máté Adamcsek (to Nyíregyháza)
—	RW	HUN	Norbert Geiger (to Tiszakécske)
—	DF	HUN	Martin Króner (to Soroksár)
—	DF	HUN	Milán Sági (to Kecskemét)
—	DF	HUN	Csaba Preklet (to III. Kerület)
—	MF	HUN	Bálint Károly (to Kozármisleny)
—	MF	HUN	Bence Grabant (to III. Kerület)
—	GK	HUN	Erik Bukrán (to Békéscsaba)
—	MF	HUN	György Hursán (to Szombathelyi Haladás)
—	FW	HUN	Barna Keresztes (to Pécsi EAC)
—	MF	HUN	Ádám Bohata (to Pécsi EAC)
—	FW	HUN	Zalán Szabó (loan to Pécsi EAC)
—	DF	HUN	Zoltán Dávid (to (Slovenia) Nafta Lendava)
—	FW	HUN	Gábor Makrai (loan to Siófok)
—	FW	HUN	Bence Bíró (loan return to MTK Budapest)
—	MF	HUN	Balázs Zsemlye (loan return to Diósgyőr)

== Competitions ==
=== Overview ===
Competition	First match	Last match	Starting round	Final position	Record							
Competition	First match	Last match	Starting round	Final position	Pld	W	D	L	GF	GA	GD	Win %
Nemzeti Bajnokság II	31 July 2022	21 May 2023	Matchday 1	7th	38	14	16	8	38	31	+7	36.84
Magyar Kupa	18 September 2022	18 September 2022	Round of 64	Round of 64	1	0	0	1	0	1	−1	0.00
Total					39	14	16	9	38	32	+6	35.90

Source: Competitions

=== Nemzeti Bajnokság II ===
==== League table ====
Pos	Team	Pld	W	D	L	GF	GA	GD	Pts
5	Soroksár	38	16	13	9	57	48	+9	61
6	Gyirmót	38	17	9	12	59	46	+13	60
7	Pécs	38	14	16	8	38	31	+7	58
8	Siófok	38	15	11	12	45	51	−6	56
9	Haladás	38	14	9	15	54	56	−2	51

Source: Hungarian Football Federation (in Hungarian), Soccerway
Rules for classification: 1) Points; 2) Matches won; 3) Goal difference; 4) Goals scored; 5) Head-to-head points; 6) Head-to-head goal difference; 7) Fair play ranking; 8) Drawing of lots.

==== Results summary ====
Overall								Home						Away					
Pld	W	D	L	GF	GA	GD	Pts	W	D	L	GF	GA	GD	W	D	L	GF	GA	GD
38	14	16	8	38	31	+7	58	8	8	3	21	14	+7	6	8	5	17	17	0

Last updated: 13 November 2022.
Source: Soccerway

==== Results by round ====
Round	1	2	3	4	5	6	7	8	9	10	11	12	13	14	15	16	17	18	19	20	21	22	23	24	25	26	27	28	29	30	31	32	33	34	35	36	37	38
Ground	H	A	H	A	H	A	H	A	H	A	H	A	H	H	A	H	A	H	A	A	H	A	H	A	H	A	A	H	H	A	H	A	A	H	A	H	A	H
Result	W	D	W	D	W	D	D	W	W	D	W	W	W	D	D	D	D	W	L	W	L	W	D	L	D	W	L	D	D	L	L	L	L	D	D	D	W	W
Position	8	4	3	3	3	4	5	3	2	1	1	1	1	1	2	2	2	2	2	2	3	3	3	3	3	3	3	5	6	6	6	6	6	8	8	7	7	7

Source: Matches
A = Away; H = Home; W = Win; D = Draw; L = Loss

==== Matches ====
31 July 2022 1	Pécs	1–0	Békéscsaba	Pécs
19:00 CEST	Tóth-Gábor 71'	Report		Stadium: Stadion PMFC; Attendance: 1,500; Referee: Tibor Farkas

7 August 2022 2	Budafok	2–2	Pécs	Budapest
19:00 CEST	Fótyik 15'; Horgosi 41'	Report	Tóth-Gábor 12'; Harsányi 58'	Stadium: Promontor utcai Stadion; Attendance: 500; Referee: Márió Görög

14 August 2022 3	Pécs	2–1	Mosonmagyaróvár	Pécs
19:00 CEST	Harsányi 24'; Czingráber 28' (o.g.)	Report	Nagy 71'	Stadium: Stadion PMFC; Attendance: 1,700; Referee: Balázs Katona

17 August 2022 4	Kozármisleny	0–0	Pécs	Kozármisleny
19:00 CEST		Report		Stadium: Városi Stadion; Attendance: 1,500; Referee: Ádám Radványi

22 August 2022 5	Pécs	4–3	Diósgyőr	Pécs
17:45 CEST	Tóth-Gábor 20' (pen.), 36'; Harsányi 24', 69'	Report	Farkaš 5'; Szőke 26'; Lukács 49'; Szatmári (red card) 20'; Oláh (red card) 75'	Stadium: Stadion PMFC; Attendance: 1,800; Referee: Péter Antal

28 August 2022 6	Csákvár	0–0	Pécs	Csákvár
17:30 CEST		Report		Stadium: Tersztyánszky Ödön Sportközpont; Attendance: 300; Referee: Szabolcs Szilasi

4 September 2022 7	Pécs	0–0	Nyíregyháza	Pécs
17:00 CEST		Report		Stadium: Stadion PMFC; Attendance: 1,800; Referee: Tamás Móri

11 September 2022 8	Győr	0–1	Pécs	Győr
17:00 CEST		Report	Tóth-Gábor 34'	Stadium: ETO Park; Attendance: 1,378; Referee: Zoltán J. Kovács

2 October 2022 9	Pécs	1–0	Haladás	Pécs
17:00 CEST	Kesztyűs 61' (pen.)	Report		Stadium: Stadion PMFC; Attendance: 1,200; Referee: Mihály Káprály

5 October 2022 10	Siófok	0–0	Pécs	Siófok
18:00 CEST		Report		Stadium: Révész Géza utcai Stadion; Attendance: 300; Referee: Tamás Sipos

9 October 2022 11	Pécs	2–1	Soroksár	Pécs
17:00 CEST	Tóth-Gábor 53', 73' (pen.)	Report	Hudák 20'; Lisztes (red card) 67'	Stadium: Stadion PMFC; Attendance: 1,800; Referee: Tibor Farkas

16 October 2022 12	Tiszakécske	1–2	Pécs	Tiszakécske
17:00 CEST	Horváth 68'	Report	Rácz 8'; Tóth-Gábor 62'	Stadium: Városi Stadion; Attendance: 450; Referee: Bence Hanyecz

22 October 2022 13	Pécs	1–0	Ajka	Pécs
17:00 CEST	Kocsis 38'	Report		Stadium: Stadion PMFC; Attendance: 1,300; Referee: Imre Kovács

31 October 2022 14	Pécs	0–0	Szeged	Pécs
20:00 CET		Report		Stadium: Stadion PMFC; Attendance: 2,500; Referee: Mihály Káprály

6 November 2022 15	Kazincbarcika	1–1	Pécs	Kazincbarcika
13:00 CET	Katona 68' (o.g.)	Report	Harsányi 52'	Stadium: Kolorcity Arena; Attendance: 400; Referee: Ádám Pillók

9 November 2022 16	Pécs	1–1	Gyirmót	Pécs
18:00 CET	Tóth-Gábor 12' (pen.)	Report	Erdei 59'	Stadium: Stadion PMFC; Attendance: 1,200; Referee: Péter Antal

13 November 2022 17	MTK Budapest	1–1	Pécs	Budapest
11:30 CET	Stieber 18'	Report	Hadaró 27'; Szeles (red card) 87'	Stadium: Hidegkuti Nándor Stadion; Attendance: 1,460; Referee: Márton Rúsz

27 November 2022 18	Pécs	2–1	Szentlőrinc	Pécs
15:00 CET (UTC+1)	Hadaró (yellow card) 12'; Katona (yellow card) 12'; Nikitscher 13'; Harsányi (yellow card) 41', (goal) 90+1'	Report	Havas (yellow card) 56'; Lénárt (yellow card) 56'; Rétyi (yellow card) 73'; Grumić 85', (yellow card) 90+2'; Prokop (yellow card) 90+2'	Stadium: Stadion PMFC; Attendance: 2,000; Referee: Balázs Berke

4 December 2022 19	Dorog	1–0	Pécs	Dorog
13:00 CET (UTC+1)	Szedlár 36'; Sztojka (yellow card) 87'	Report	Terbe (yellow card) 45+1'; Kesztyűs (yellow card) 54'; Weitner (not on pitch) (yellow card) 89'	Stadium: Buzánszky Jenő Stadion; Attendance: 300; Referee: Tamás Móri

11 December 2022 20	Békéscsaba	0–1	Pécs	Békéscsaba
13:00 CET (UTC+1)	Czékus (yellow card) 90+2'	Report	Terbe (yellow card) 25'; Kocsis 47'; Mayer (yellow card) 80'	Stadium: Kórház utcai Stadion; Attendance: 340; Referee: Tamás Berényi

29 January 2023 21	Pécs	0–1	Budafok	Pécs
15:00 CET (UTC+1)	Katona (yellow card) 63'; Pejović (yellow card) 90+4'	Report	Németh 7'; Mátyus (not on pitch) (yellow card) 14'; Horgosi (yellow card) 30'; Sós (yellow card) 43'; Jagodics (yellow card) 56'; Soltész (yellow card) 68'; Vaszicsku (yellow card) 87'	Stadium: Stadion PMFC; Attendance: 800; Referee: Balázs Katona

5 February 2023 22	Mosonmagyaróvár	1–2	Pécs	Mosonmagyaróvár
14:00 CET (UTC+1)	Illés (yellow card) 20'; S. Papp 45'	Report	Tóth-Gábor 41'; Rácz (yellow card) 44'; Gera 72'; Pejović (yellow card) 79'	Stadium: Wittmann Antal park Attendance: 300; Referee: Tibor Farkas

12 February 2023 23	Pécs	0–0	Kozármisleny	Pécs
15:00 CET (UTC+1)	Mayer (yellow card) 31'; Krausz (yellow card) 69'; Kártik (yellow card) 87'; Weitner (not on pitch) (yellow card) 90'	Report	Tölgyesi (yellow card) 30'; Vajda (yellow card) 61'; Szekeres (not on pitch) (yellow card) 67'; Gajág (yellow card) 78'; Füredi (red card) 84'	Stadium: Stadion PMFC; Attendance: 1,300; Referee: Tamás Sipos

20 February 2023 24	Diósgyőr	3–2	Pécs	Miskolc
19:00 CET (UTC+1)	Bényei (yellow card) 20'; Bokros (yellow card) 31'; Lukács 40' (pen.); Eppel (yellow card) 41'; Könyves (yellow card) 62'; Lőrinczy 75'; Cseke 80'; Bárdos (red card) 81'; Danilović (yellow card) 90+3'	Report	Shvedyuk (yellow card) 39'; Kocsis 45+2'; Rácz (yellow card) 71'; Gera 90+3'	Stadium: DVTK Stadion; Attendance: 3,153; Referee: Imre Kovács

26 February 2023 25	Pécs	1–1	Csákvár	Pécs
15:00 CET (UTC+1)	Tóth-Gábor 43'; Kesztyűs (yellow card) 45'; Terbe (yellow card) 69'; Szeles (yellow card) 78'	Report	Ominger 6', (yellow card) 77'; Vaskó (yellow card) 54'; Torvund (red card) 75'; Mészáros (yellow card) 84'	Stadium: Stadion PMFC; Attendance: 200; Referee: Tamás Berényi

5 March 2023 26	Nyíregyháza	1–2	Pécs	Balmazújváros
14:00 CET (UTC+1)	Novák 25'; Farkas (yellow card) 53'; Jánvári (yellow card) 88'	Report	Gera 10'; Weitner (not on pitch) (yellow card) 47'; Kesztyűs 65' (pen.); Katona (yellow card) 71'; Rácz (yellow card) 78'	Stadium: Városi Stadion; Attendance: 300; Referee: Bence Hanyecz

12 March 2023 27	Pécs	0–1	Győr	Pécs
15:00 CET (UTC+1)	Pejović (yellow card) 36'; Weitner (not on pitch) (yellow card) 70'	Report	Keresztes (red card) 13'; Szendrei 21'; Kovácsik (yellow card) 63'	Stadium: Stadion PMFC; Attendance: 1,300; Referee: Marcell Derdák

19 March 2023 28	Haladás	1–1	Pécs	Szombathely
14:00 CET (UTC+1)	Németh (yellow card) 26'; Borvető (yellow card) 28'; Zvekanov (yellow card) 36'; Simut 60'; Molnár (yellow card) 67'; Devecseri (yellow card) 76'; Csilus (yellow card) 81'	Report	Tóth-Gábor (yellow card) 36'; Svedyuk 65'; Krausz (yellow card) 73'	Stadium: Haladás Sportkomplexum; Attendance: 928; Referee: Tamás Móri

2 April 2023 29	Pécs	2–2	Siófok	Pécs
16:00 CEST (UTC+2)	Pejović (yellow card) 15', (goal) 90'; Krausz (yellow card) 33'; Gera 54'; Terbe (yellow card) 69'; Rácz (red card) 83'; Kesztyűs (yellow card) 87'	Report	Major (yellow card) 12'; Farkas 16' (pen.); Winter (yellow card) 31'; Varjas 65'	Stadium: Stadion PMFC; Attendance: 1,100; Referee: Ádám Pillók

9 April 2023 30	Soroksár	2–0	Pécs	Budapest
16:00 CEST (UTC+2)	Halmai 54', 61'; Valencsik (red card) 63'; Kovács (yellow card) 83'; Ternován (yellow card) 90+1'	Report	Katona (yellow card) 12'; Gera (yellow card) 34'; Harsányi (yellow card) 63'	Stadium: Sporttelep Mihály Szamosi; Attendance: 350; Referee: Dr Bence Csonka

12 April 2023 31	Pécs	0–1	Tiszakécske	Pécs
18:00 CEST (UTC+2)	Kocsis (yellow card) 90+1'; Tóth-Gábor (yellow card) 90+4'	Report	A. Farkas (yellow card) 31'; Winkler (yellow card) 47', (goal) 61'; N. Farkas (yellow card) 90+2'	Stadium: Stadion PMFC; Attendance: 600; Referee: Zoltán J. Kovács

16 April 2023 32	Ajka	1–0	Pécs	Ajka
17:00 CEST (UTC+2)	Szarka 34' (pen.); Tar (yellow card) 62'; Kenderes (yellow card) 64'; Sejben (yellow card) 79'; Gaál (yellow card) 88'; Horváth (yellow card) 89'; Vogyicska (yellow card) 90+6'	Report	Pejović (yellow card) 33'; Takács (yellow card) 61'; Gera (yellow card) 75'; Szabó (yellow card) 90+6'	Stadium: Városi Stadion; Attendance: 800; Referee: Márió Görög

23 April 2023 33	Szeged	1–0	Pécs	Szeged
17:00 CEST (UTC+2)	Farkas (yellow card) 19'; Gajdos 52'; Bíró (yellow card) 64'; Tóth (yellow card) 69'; Kundrák (yellow card) 79'	Report	Harsányi (yellow card) 24'; Terbe (yellow card) 72'; Weitner (not on pitch) (yellow card) 72'; Rácz (yellow card) 86'	Stadium: Szent Gellért Fórum; Attendance: 1,645; Referee: Bence Hanyecz

26 April 2023 34	Pécs	1–1	Kazincbarcika	Pécs
18:00 CEST (UTC+2)	Szabó (yellow card) 41', (goal) 77'; Mayer (yellow card) 70'	Report	Csatári 29'; J. Nagy (yellow card) 41'; B. Kovács (yellow card) 46'; Csábi (not on pitch) (yellow card) 64'; Bacsa (yellow card) 72'; Megyeri (yellow card) 90'	Stadium: Stadion PMFC; Attendance: 400; Referee: Tamás Takács

30 April 2023 35	Gyirmót	0–0	Pécs	Győr
17:00 CEST (UTC+2)	Madarász (yellow card) 43'; Medgyes (yellow card) 49'; M. Kovács (yellow card) 67'; Erdei (yellow card) 71'; Szegi (yellow card) 85'; Berki (yellow card) 88'	Report	Kocsis (yellow card) 82'	Stadium: Ménfői úti Stadion; Attendance: 626; Referee: Tibor Farkas

8 May 2023 36	Pécs	0–0	MTK Budapest	Pécs
19:00 CEST (UTC+2)	Rácz (yellow card) 87'	Report	Vadnai (yellow card) 70'; Palincsár (yellow card) 82'	Stadium: Stadion PMFC; Attendance: 800; Referee: Mihály Káprály

14 May 2023 37	Szentlőrinc	1–2	Pécs	Szentlőrinc
17:00 CEST (UTC+2)	Grumić 3', (yellow card) 44'; Kesztyűs (yellow card) 42'; Múcska (yellow card) 47'; Tamás (yellow card) 59'; Prokop (red card) 69'	Report	Terbe (yellow card) 1'; Tóth-Gábor 7'; Gera (yellow card) 13', (goal) 22'; Helesfay (yellow card) 82'; Takács (yellow card) 89'; Katona (red card) 90+2'	Stadium: Szentlőrinci Sporttelep; Attendance: 450; Referee: Marcell Derdák

21 May 2023 38	Pécs	3–0	Dorog	Pécs
17:00 CEST (UTC+2)	Tóth-Gábor 10'; Szabó 58'; Kocsis 60'	Report	Lénárth (yellow card) 15'; Papp (yellow card) 57'	Stadium: Stadion PMFC; Attendance: 500; Referee: Attila Molnár

=== Magyar Kupa ===
18 September 2022 Round of 64	Pécs	0–1	Paks	Pécs
13:00 CEST (UTC+2)	Szeles (yellow card) 10'; Takács (yellow card) 41'; Weitner (not on pitch) (yellow card) 76'; Kesztyűs (red card) 82'; Katona (yellow card) 89'	Report	Kinyik (yellow card) 14'; Varga 63' (pen.); Hahn (yellow card) 64'; Osváth (yellow card) 75'	Stadium: Stadion PMFC; Attendance: 1,500; Referee: Marcell Derdák

== Statistics ==
=== Appearances and goals ===
Last updated on 13 November 2022.

No.	Pos	Nat	Player	Total		Nemzeti Bajnokság II		Magyar Kupa	
No.	Pos	Nat	Player	Apps	Goals	Apps	Goals	Apps	Goals
1	GK	(Hungary) HUN	Szilveszter Nagy	0	0	0	-0	0	-0
3	DF	(Hungary) HUN	László Rácz	16	1	16	1	0	0
5	MF	(Hungary) HUN	Zsombor Futó	5	0	5	0	0	0
6	DF	(Hungary) HUN	Levente Katona	18	0	17	0	1	0
7	MF	(Hungary) HUN	Dávid Kónya	8	0	7	0	1	0
10	FW	(Hungary) HUN	István Harsányi	14	5	13	5	1	0
11	FW	(Hungary) HUN	Kristóf Tóth-Gábor	18	9	17	9	1	0
12	GK	(Hungary) HUN	Péter Kovács	1	-1	0	-0	1	-1
13	GK	(Hungary) HUN	Donát Helesfay	17	-11	17	-11	0	-0
14	DF	(Hungary) HUN	Zsombor Takács	7	0	6	0	1	0
17	FW	(Hungary) HUN	Olivér Tihanyi	2	0	2	0	0	0
18	MF	(Hungary) HUN	Barna Kesztyűs	18	1	17	1	1	0
19	MF	(Hungary) HUN	Péter Kövesdi	6	0	6	0	0	0
20	FW	(Hungary) HUN	Zalán Gera	12	0	11	0	1	0
21	DF	(Hungary) HUN	Botond Terbe	10	0	10	0	0	0
22	MF	(Hungary) HUN	Márk Hegedűs	4	0	3	0	1	0
24	MF	(Hungary) HUN	Patrik Marques-Airosa	6	0	5	0	1	0
27	MF	(Hungary) HUN	Bence Vas	1	0	1	0	0	0
29	MF	(Ukraine) UKR	Alex Svedyuk	16	0	15	0	1	0
30	DF	(Hungary) HUN	János Mayer	13	0	13	0	0	0
32	DF	(Hungary) HUN	Valentin Hadaró	15	1	14	1	1	0
44	MF	(Hungary) HUN	Tamás Nikitscher	18	0	17	0	1	0
77	MF	(Hungary) HUN	Bence Kocsis	13	1	12	1	1	0
88	DF	(Hungary) HUN	Tamás Szeles	12	0	11	0	1	0
Youth players:
12	GK	(Hungary) HUN	Dániel Varga	0	0	0	-0	0	-0
80	MF	(Hungary) HUN	Edvin Bachesz	0	0	0	0	0	0
Out to loan:
99	FW	(Hungary) HUN	Gábor Makrai	5	0	5	0	0	0
Players no longer at the club:
10	MF	(Hungary) HUN	Bence Grabant	3	0	3	0	0	0

=== Top scorers ===
Includes all competitive matches. The list is sorted by shirt number when total goals are equal.

Last updated on 13 November 2022

Position	Nation	Number	Name	Nemzeti Bajnokság II	Magyar Kupa	Total
1	(Hungary)	11	Kristóf Tóth-Gábor	9	0	9
2	(Hungary)	10	István Harsányi	5	0	5
3	(Hungary)	18	Barna Kesztyűs	1	0	1
4	(Hungary)	3	László Rácz	1	0	1
5	(Hungary)	77	Bence Kocsis	1	0	1
6	(Hungary)	32	Valentin Hadaró	1	0	1
/	/	/	Own Goals	1	0	1
			TOTALS	19	0	19

=== Disciplinary record ===
Includes all competitive matches. Players with 1 card or more included only.

Last updated on 13 November 2022

Position	Nation	Number	Name	Nemzeti Bajnokság II		Magyar Kupa		Total (Hu Total)	
Position	Nation	Number	Name	Yellow card	Red card	Yellow card	Red card	Yellow card	Red card
DF	(Hungary)	3	László Rácz	4	0	0	0	4 (4)	0 (0)
DF	(Hungary)	6	Levente Katona	4	0	1	0	5 (4)	0 (0)
FW	(Hungary)	9	István Harsányi	1	0	0	0	1 (1)	0 (0)
FW	(Hungary)	11	Kristóf Tóth-Gábor	4	0	0	0	4 (4)	0 (0)
GK	(Hungary)	13	Donát Helesfay	1	0	0	0	1 (1)	0 (0)
DF	(Hungary)	14	Zsombor Takács	3	0	1	0	4 (3)	0 (0)
MF	(Hungary)	18	Barna Kesztyűs	2	0	0	1	2 (2)	1 (0)
FW	(Hungary)	20	Zalán Gera	2	0	0	0	2 (2)	0 (0)
DF	(Hungary)	21	Botond Terbe	2	0	0	0	2 (2)	0 (0)
MF	(Hungary)	22	Márk Hegedűs	1	0	0	0	1 (1)	0 (0)
MF	(Hungary)	24	Patrik Marques-Airosa	1	0	0	0	1 (1)	0 (0)
DF	(Hungary)	30	János Mayer	6	0	0	0	6 (6)	0 (0)
DF	(Hungary)	32	Valentin Hadaró	3	0	0	0	3 (3)	0 (0)
MF	(Hungary)	44	Tamás Nikitscher	4	0	0	0	4 (4)	0 (0)
MF	(Hungary)	77	Bence Kocsis	1	0	0	0	1 (1)	0 (0)
DF	(Hungary)	88	Tamás Szeles	0	1	1	0	1 (0)	1 (1)
			TOTALS	39	1	3	1	42 (39)	2 (1)

=== Clean sheets ===
Last updated on 13 November 2022

Position	Nation	Number	Name	Nemzeti Bajnokság II	Magyar Kupa	Total
1	(Hungary)	13	Donát Helesfay	9	0	9
2	(Hungary)	12	Péter Kovács	0	0	0
3	(Hungary)	1	Szilveszter Nagy	0	0	0
4	(Hungary)	12	Dániel Varga	0	0	0
			TOTALS	9	0	9
