= Csaba Vachtler =

Hungarian footballer (born 1993)

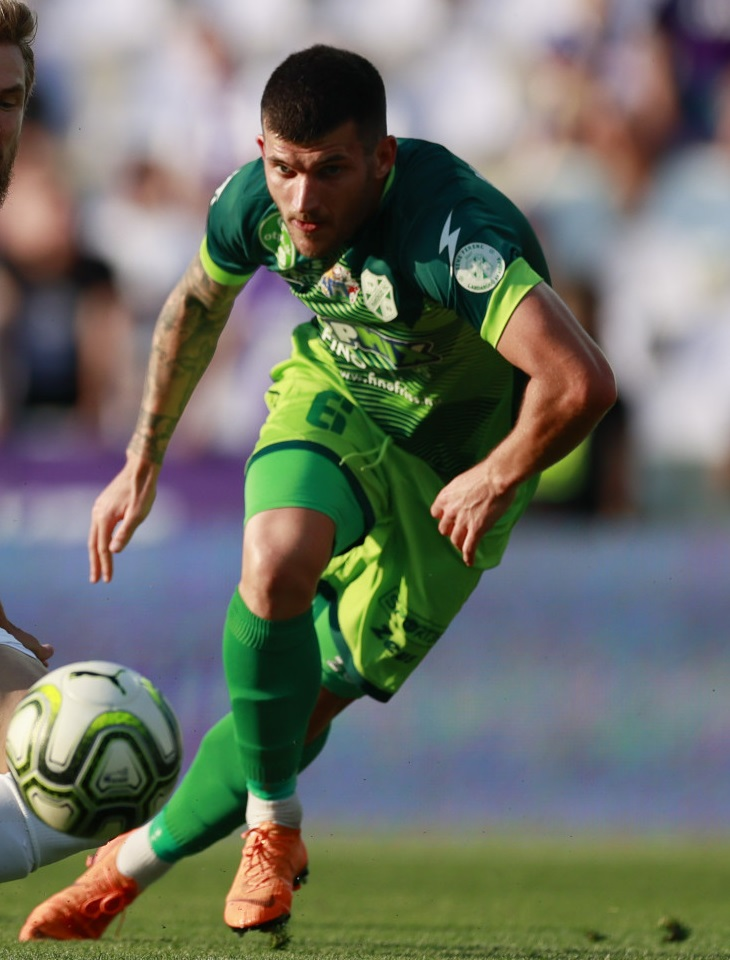
- Vachtler playing for Kaposvár in 2020

Personal information
- Date of birth: 16 March 1993 (age 33)
- Place of birth: Mór, Hungary
- Height: 1.87 m (6 ft 2 in)
- Position: Defender

Team information
- Current team: SVg Pitten

Youth career
- 2003–2012: Videoton

Senior career*
| Years | Team | Apps | (Gls) |
| 2012–2013 | Videoton | 0 | (0) |
| 2013–2017 | Puskás Akadémia | 4 | (0) |
| 2014–2017 | → Balmazújváros (loan) | 62 | (3) |
| 2017–2021 | Kaposvár | 114 | (4) |
| 2021–2023 | Tiszakécske | 61 | (2) |
| 2023– | SVg Pitten | | |
- * Club domestic league appearances and goals as of 31 May 2023

Csaba Vachtler (born 16 March 1993) is a Hungarian professional footballer who plays for Austrian club SVg Pitten.

== Career statistics ==
Appearances and goals by club, season and competition
| Club | Season | League | | | Cup | | League Cup | | Europe | | Total | |
| Club | Season | Division | Apps | Goals | Apps | Goals | Apps | Goals | Apps | Goals | Apps | Goals |
|---|---|---|---|---|---|---|---|---|---|---|---|---|
| Videoton | 2012–13 | Nemzeti Bajnokság I | 0 | 0 | 0 | 0 | 2 | 1 | 0 | 0 | 2 | 1 |
| Puskás | 2013–14 | Nemzeti Bajnokság I | 4 | 0 | 0 | 0 | 3 | 0 | 0 | 0 | 7 | 0 |
Balmazújváros
| Balmazújváros | 2013–14 | Nemzeti Bajnokság II | 15 | 0 | 0 | 0 | — | | — | | 15 | 0 |
| Balmazújváros | 2014–15 | Nemzeti Bajnokság II | 29 | 3 | 2 | 0 | 5 | 0 | — | | 36 | 3 |
| Balmazújváros | 2015–16 | Nemzeti Bajnokság II | 4 | 0 | 2 | 1 | — | | — | | 6 | 1 |
| Balmazújváros | 2016–17 | Nemzeti Bajnokság II | 14 | 0 | 3 | 0 | — | | — | | 17 | 0 |
| Balmazújváros | Total | | 62 | 3 | 7 | 1 | 5 | 0 | 0 | 0 | 74 | 4 |
Kaposvár
| Kaposvár | 2017–18 | Nemzeti Bajnokság III | 19 | 0 | 1 | 0 | — | | — | | 20 | 0 |
| Kaposvár | 2018–19 | Nemzeti Bajnokság II | 34 | 3 | 2 | 0 | — | | — | | 36 | 3 |
| Kaposvár | 2019–20 | Nemzeti Bajnokság I | 31 | 0 | 3 | 2 | — | | — | | 34 | 2 |
| Kaposvár | Total | | 84 | 3 | 6 | 2 | — | | — | | 90 | 5 |
| Career total | | | 150 | 6 | 13 | 3 | 10 | 1 | 0 | 0 | 173 | 10 |

Updated to games played as of 27 June 2020.
