= László Laky =

Hungarian footballer

Personal information
- Date of birth: 6 February 2000 (age 26)
- Place of birth: Székesfehérvár, Hungary
- Height: 1.91 m (6 ft 3 in)
- Position: Goalkeeper

Team information
- Current team: Komárno
- Number: 35

Youth career
- 2012–2015: Videoton
- 2015-2017: Puskás Akadémia

Senior career*
Years	Team	Apps	(Gls)
2017–2020	Puskás Akadémia II	14	(0)
2020–2021	Kaposvár	4	(0)
2021–2022	Békéscsaba	2	(0)
2022	Komárom	0	(0)
2022–	Komárno	0	(0)

International career
2015	Hungary U-16	2	(0)
2017	Hungary U-18	4	(0)
- * Club domestic league appearances and goals as of 4 March 2023

László Laky (born 6 February 2000) is a Hungarian professional footballer who plays for KFC Komárno.

== Career statistics ==
As of 14 June 2020.

Appearances and goals by club, season and competition
Club	Season	League			Cup		Continental		Other		Total	
Club	Season	Division	Apps	Goals	Apps	Goals	Apps	Goals	Apps	Goals	Apps	Goals
Puskás Akadémia II	2017–18	Nemzeti Bajnokság III	1	0	—		—		0	0	1	0
Puskás Akadémia II	2018–19	Nemzeti Bajnokság III	3	0	—		—		0	0	3	0
Puskás Akadémia II	2019–20	Nemzeti Bajnokság III	10	0	—		—		0	0	10	0
Puskás Akadémia II	Total		14	0	0	0	0	0	0	0	14	0
Kaposvár	2019–20	Nemzeti Bajnokság I	1	0	0	0	—		0	0	1	0
Kaposvár	Total		1	0	0	0	0	0	0	0	1	0
Career total			15	0	0	0	0	0	0	0	15	0
