= Bálint Tömösvári =

Hungarian footballer

Personal information
- Date of birth: 14 June 1998 (age 28)
- Place of birth: Szolnok, Hungary
- Height: 1.79 m (5 ft 10 in)
- Position: Forward

Team information
- Current team: Szolnok
- Number: 16

Youth career
- 2009–2013: Szolnok
- 2013–2015: Budapest Honvéd

Senior career*
Years	Team	Apps	(Gls)
2015–2021	Budapest Honvéd II	29	(7)
2016–2021	Budapest Honvéd	14	(0)
2018–2019	→ Kaposvár (loan)	28	(3)
2019	→ Kaposvár (loan)	1	(1)
2020	→ Győri ETO (loan)	4	(0)
2020–2021	→ Siófok (loan)	28	(2)
2021–	Szolnok	67	(10)

International career
2014–2015	Hungary U17	5	(0)
2016–2017	Hungary U19	4	(1)
- * Club domestic league appearances and goals as of 20:03, 17 July 2023 (UTC)

Bálint Tömösvári (born 14 June 1998) is a Hungarian professional footballer who plays as a forward for Szolnok.

== Career statistics ==
Appearances and goals by club, season and competition
Club	Season	League			Cup		Europe		Total	
Club	Season	Division	Apps	Goals	Apps	Goals	Apps	Goals	Apps	Goals
Budapest Honvéd II
Budapest Honvéd II	2015–16	Nemzeti Bajnokság III	5	1	0	0	0	0	5	1
Budapest Honvéd II	2016–17	Nemzeti Bajnokság III	22	6	0	0	0	0	22	6
Budapest Honvéd II	2017–18	Nemzeti Bajnokság III	15	2	0	0	0	0	15	2
Budapest Honvéd II	Total		42	9	0	0	0	0	42	9
Budapest Honvéd
Budapest Honvéd	2016–17	Nemzeti Bajnokság I	3	0	2	2	0	0	5	2
Budapest Honvéd	2017–18	Nemzeti Bajnokság I	11	0	2	0	1	0	14	0
Budapest Honvéd	Total		14	0	4	2	1	0	19	2
Kaposvár
Kaposvár	2018–19	Nemzeti Bajnokság II	28	3	2	0	—		30	3
Kaposvár	2019–20	Nemzeti Bajnokság I	1	1	0	0	—		1	1
Kaposvár	Total		29	4	2	0	0	0	31	4
Career total			85	13	6	2	1	0	92	15

Updated to games played as of 15 December 2019.
