= László Ur =

Hungarian footballer (born 1988)

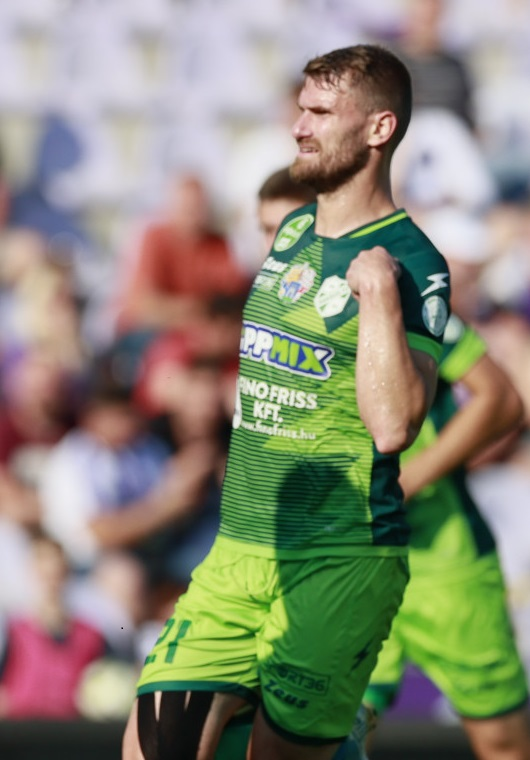
- Ur playing for Kaposvár in 2020

Personal information
- Date of birth: 5 March 1988 (age 38)
- Place of birth: Nyíregyháza, Hungary
- Height: 1.90 m (6 ft 3 in)
- Position: Centre-back

Team information
- Current team: Sényő

Youth career
- 2002–2006: Nyíregyháza

Senior career*
Years	Team	Apps	(Gls)
2006–2011	Nyíregyháza	1	(0)
2007–2008	→ Tuzsér (loan)	23	(2)
2009–2011	→ Bőcs (loan)	65	(1)
2011–2012	Mezőkövesd	7	(0)
2012–2013	Nyíregyháza	31	(2)
2013–2016	Cigánd	80	(5)
2016–2017	Nyíregyháza	32	(1)
2017–2021	Kaposvár	111	(3)
2021–2023	Kazincbarcika	67	(5)
2023–	Sényő	11	(1)
- * Club domestic league appearances and goals as of 15 October 2023

László Ur (born 5 March 1988) is a Hungarian professional footballer who plays for Sényő.

== Career statistics ==
Appearances and goals by club, season and competition
Club	Season	League			Cup		League Cup		Europe		Total	
Club	Season	Division	Apps	Goals	Apps	Goals	Apps	Goals	Apps	Goals	Apps	Goals
Nyíregyháza
Nyíregyháza	2006–07	Nemzeti Bajnokság II	1	0	0	0	—		—		1	0
Nyíregyháza	2008–09	Nemzeti Bajnokság I	0	0	0	0	6	0	—		6	0
Nyíregyháza	2011–12	Nemzeti Bajnokság II	13	1	0	0	0	0	—		13	1
Nyíregyháza	2012–13	Nemzeti Bajnokság II	18	1	4	0	0	0	—		22	1
Nyíregyháza	2016–17	Nemzeti Bajnokság II	32	1	2	0	—		—		34	1
Nyíregyháza	Total		64	3	6	0	6	0	0	0	76	3
Tuzsér	2007–08	Nemzeti Bajnokság II	23	2	0	0	—		—		23	2
Bőcs
Bőcs	2008–09	Nemzeti Bajnokság II	14	0	0	0	2	0	—		16	0
Bőcs	2009–10	Nemzeti Bajnokság II	26	0	1	0	—		—		27	0
Bőcs	2010–11	Nemzeti Bajnokság II	25	1	2	1	—		—		27	2
Bőcs	Total		65	1	3	1	2	0	0	0	70	2
Mezőkövesd	2011–12	Nemzeti Bajnokság II	7	0	2	0	4	0	—		13	0
Cigánd
Cigánd	2013–14	Nemzeti Bajnokság III	27	2	4	0	—		—		31	2
Cigánd	2014–15	Nemzeti Bajnokság III	26	3	1	0	—		—		27	3
Cigánd	2015–16	Nemzeti Bajnokság III	27	0	2	0	—		—		29	0
Cigánd	Total		80	5	7	0	—		—		87	5
Kaposvár
Kaposvár	2017–18	Nemzeti Bajnokság III	26	1	1	0	—		—		27	1
Kaposvár	2018–19	Nemzeti Bajnokság II	36	0	2	0	—		—		38	0
Kaposvár	2019–20	Nemzeti Bajnokság I	17	0	2	0	—		—		19	0
Kaposvár	Total		79	1	5	0	—		—		84	1
Career total			318	12	23	1	12	0	0	0	353	13

Updated to games played as of 27 June 2020.
