= Márk Bonnyai =

Hungarian footballer

Personal information
- Date of birth: 28 June 1999 (age 27)
- Place of birth: Nagyatád, Hungary
- Height: 1.85 m (6 ft 1 in)
- Position: Goalkeeper

Team information
- Current team: Veszprém

Youth career
- 2011–2013: Segesd
- 2013-2018: Kaposvár

Senior career*
Years	Team	Apps	(Gls)
2018–2021	Kaposvár	8	(0)
2021	Nagyatád	11	(0)
2021–	Veszprém	2	(0)
- * Club domestic league appearances and goals as of 4 May 2022

Márk Bonnyai (born 28 June 1999) is a Hungarian professional footballer who plays for Veszprém.

== Career statistics ==
As of 27 June 2020.

Appearances and goals by club, season and competition
Club	Season	League			Cup		Continental		Other		Total	
Club	Season	Division	Apps	Goals	Apps	Goals	Apps	Goals	Apps	Goals	Apps	Goals
Kaposvár	2018–19	Nemzeti Bajnokság II	7	0	2	0	—		0	0	9	0
Kaposvár	2019–20	Nemzeti Bajnokság I	1	0	0	0	—		0	0	1	0
Kaposvár	Total		8	0	2	0	0	0	0	0	10	0
Career total			8	0	2	0	0	0	0	0	10	0
