= Norbert Csiki =

Hungarian football player

Personal information
- Full name: Norbert Gábor Csiki
- Date of birth: 21 May 1991 (age 35)
- Place of birth: Budapest, Hungary
- Height: 1.84 m (6 ft 1/2 in)
- Position: Forward

Team information
- Current team: Balassagyarmat
- Number: 10

Youth career
- 2003–2005: Ferencváros
- 2005–2010: MTK
- 2009: → Oldham Athletic (loan)

Senior career*
Years	Team	Apps	(Gls)
2010–2015	MTK	56	(17)
2016	Sisaket	17	(2)
2016–2017	Gyirmót	23	(1)
2017–2018	Vasas	1	(0)
2018–2019	Budaörs	24	(8)
2019–2020	Kaposvár	25	(1)
2020–2021	Budaörs	15	(3)
2021–	Balassagyarmat		

International career
2009–2010	Hungary U-18		
2010–2011	Hungary U-19		
- * Club domestic league appearances and goals as of 7 February 2022

Norbert Csiki (born 21 May 1991) is a Hungarian football player who plays for Balassagyarmat.

He joined English club Oldham Athletic on loan in 2009 as part of an agreement between Oldham, MTK and Liverpool. He joined the club's new Development squad. He was given the no. 35 squad number and was named as substitute for the first-team on a number of occasions. In February 2010 he returned to MTK after his loan period was cut short.

In January 2016 he joined Thai Premier League side Sisaket F.C.

== International career ==
Csiki has represented Hungary at international level as an under-17 and under-18.

== Career statistics ==
Appearances and goals by club, season and competition
Club	Season	League		Cup		League Cup		Europe		Total	
Club	Season	Apps	Goals	Apps	Goals	Apps	Goals	Apps	Goals	Apps	Goals
MTK
MTK	2008–09	0	0	0	0	1	0	0	0	1	0
MTK	2010–11	1	0	3	1	3	0	–	–	7	1
MTK	2011–12	13	5	3	1	3	1	–	–	19	7
MTK	2012–13	17	6	1	2	2	0	2	0	22	8
MTK	2013–14	8	0	3	0	1	0	–	–	12	0
MTK	2014–15	17	6	1	1	6	3	–	–	24	10
MTK	Total	56	17	11	5	16	4	2	0	85	26
Sisaket
Sisaket	2016	17	2	0	0	–	–	–	–	17	2
Sisaket	Total	17	2	0	0	–	–	–	–	17	2
Gyirmót
Gyirmót	2016–17	23	1	1	0	–	–	–	–	24	1
Gyirmót	Total	23	1	1	0	–	–	–	–	24	1
Vasas
Vasas	2017–18	1	0	0	0	–	–	–	–	1	0
Vasas	Total	1	0	0	0	–	–	–	–	1	0
Budaörs
Budaörs	2018–19	24	8	4	3	–	–	–	–	28	11
Budaörs	2020–21	15	3	1	0	–	–	–	–	16	3
Budaörs	Total	39	11	5	3	–	–	–	–	44	14
Kaposvár
Kaposvár	2019–20	25	1	0	0	–	–	–	–	25	1
Kaposvár	Total	25	1	0	0	–	–	–	–	25	1
Career total		161	32	17	8	16	4	2	0	196	44

Updated to games played as of 7 February 2022.
