= Tamás Nagy (footballer, born 1963) =

Hungarian footballer and manager

Personal information
- Date of birth: 27 October 1963 (age 63)
- Place of birth: Veszprém, Hungary

Managerial career
- Years: Team
- 2003–2005: Pécsi MFC
- 2007: Kecskeméti TE
- 2007: Zalaegerszegi TE
- 2007–2008: Pécsi MFC
- 2009–2010: Bajai LSE
- 2010–2012: Ferencvárosi TC (assistant)
- 2011: → Ferencvárosi TC (caretaker)
- 2013: FC Veszprém
- 2017–2018: FC Hatvan
- 2018: Zalaegerszegi TE
- 2021–2022: Kaposvári Rákóczi FC

Tamás Nagy (born 27 October 1963) is a Hungarian football manager and a former player. He last managed Kaposvári Rákóczi FC.

== Managerial career ==
=== Pécs ===
On 24 April 2005, he was sacked from his position as the manager of Pécsi MFC.

=== Zalaegerszeg ===
On 12 April 2007, he was appointed as the manager of Zalaegerszegi TE.

=== Pécs (second spell) ===
On 25 August 2008, he was removed from his position as manager of Pécsi MFC.

=== Baja ===
On 13 March 2009, he was appointed as the manager of Bajai LSE.

=== Ferencváros ===
On 16 August 2011, he was appointed as the caretaker manager of Ferencvárosi TC.

=== Zalaegerszeg (second spell) ===
On 22 June 2018, he was appointed as the manager of Zalaegerszegi TE a second time.

On 3 September 2018, he was sacked even if the club was at the third position in the 2018–19 Nemzeti Bajnokság II season.

=== Kaposvár ===
On 30 June 2022, he was sacked as the manager of Kaposvári Rákóczi FC.
