= Meziane Touati =

Algerian footballer (born 1969)

Personal information
- Date of birth: 14 April 1969 (age 57)
- Place of birth: Algiers, Algeria
- Position: Striker

Senior career*
| Years | Team | Apps | (Gls) |
| -1994 | USM Alger | 0 | (0) |
| 1994-1996 | Tiszakécske FC | 32 | (3) |
| 1996-1998 | Ferencvárosi TC | 10 | (0) |
| 1998-1999 | Budapest Honvéd FC | 1 | (0) |
| 1998-1999 | Soroksár SC | 2 | (0) |
| 1999-2000 | Budapesti VSC | 5 | (0) |
- * Club domestic league appearances and goals

Meziane Touati (born 14 April 1969 in Algeria) is an Algerian retired footballer.

== Career ==
In 1994, Touati signed for Tiszakécske FC to the Hungarian second league.

In 1996, Touati signed for Ferencvárosi TC.

== Honours ==
Domestic

Hungary

- Nemzeti Bajnokság II
  - First place (1): 1996–97
- Nemzeti Bajnokság I
  - Winners (1): 1997–98
- Nemzeti Bajnokság I
  - third place (1): 1996–97
