= Gábor Maczkó =

Hungarian footballer

Personal information
- Date of birth: 14 December 1970 (age 55)
- Place of birth: Hódmezővásárhely, Hungary
- Height: 1.71 m (5 ft 7 in)
- Position: Forward

Team information
- Current team: Tiszakécske

Youth career
- –1988: Hódmezővásárhely

Senior career*
Years	Team	Apps	(Gls)
1988–1993	Hódmezővásárhely	25	(3)
1990–1991	→ Honvéd (loan)	0	(0)
1993-1998	Tiszakécske FC	101	(9)
1998-2000	Kecskemét	47	(3)
2000–2009	Tiszakécske FC	25	(9)
- * Club domestic league appearances and goals as of 12 Oct 2023

Gábor Maczkó (born 14 December 1970) is a Hungarian football player who played for Tiszakécske.

== Personal life ==
Gábor Maczkó is working as a medical staff member of Tiszakécske FC team. Maczkó's son, Gábor, is also playing for Tiszakécske FC youth team.

== Honours ==
Domestic

Hungary

- Nemzeti Bajnokság II
  - First place (1): 1996–97
- Nemzeti Bajnokság III
  - Winners (1): 1992–93
- Megyei Bajnokság I
  - Winners (2): 1991–92 , 2002–03
