= Tibor Békési =

Hungarian footballer

Personal information
- Date of birth: 29 July 1965 (age 61)
- Place of birth: Kecskemét, Hungary
- Height: 1.84 m (6 ft 0 in)
- Position: Goalkeeper

Senior career*
Years	Team	Apps	(Gls)
1991–1997	Tiszakécske		
1997–2003	→ unknown (loan)		
2003–2010	Tiszaug		
2010–2011	Sarkadi Kinizsi		
2011–2012	→ Mezőgyan (loan)		
2012–201?	Sarkadi Kinizsi		
Total		0	(0)
- * Club domestic league appearances and goals

Tibor Békési (born 29 July 1965) is a Hungarian former professional football goalkeeper.

== Personal life ==
Békési's son, Tibor, is also a goalkeeper in the Tiszakécske LC youth team. His nephew János Tompa is also a professional footballer.

== Honours ==
Domestic

Hungary

- Nemzeti Bajnokság II
  - First place (1): 1996–97
- Nemzeti Bajnokság III
  - Winners (1): 1992–93
- Megyei Bajnokság I
  - Winners (1): 1991–92
