= János Nagy (footballer) =

Hungarian footballer (born 1992)

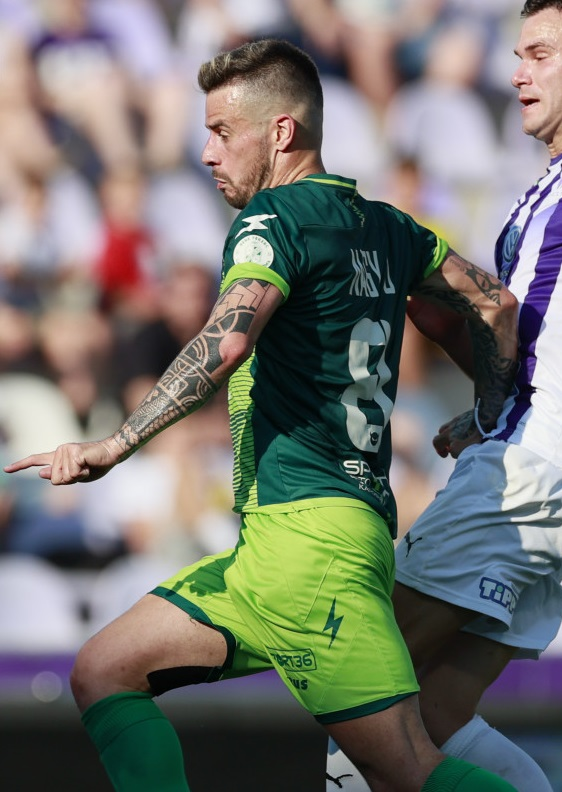
- Nagy playing for Kaposvár in 2020

Personal information
- Full name: János Patrik Nagy
- Date of birth: 7 August 1992 (age 34)
- Place of birth: Szolnok, Hungary
- Height: 1.80 m (5 ft 11 in)
- Position: Right-back

Team information
- Current team: Pécs

Youth career
- 2000–2004: Újpest
- 2004–2005: MTK Budapest
- 2005–2011: Újpest

Senior career*
| Years | Team | Apps | (Gls) |
| 2011–2013 | Újpest II | 45 | (1) |
| 2013–2015 | Újpest | 13 | (0) |
| 2013 | → Szigetszentmiklós (loan) | 16 | (0) |
| 2015 | → Siófok (loan) | 39 | (2) |
| 2016–2021 | Kaposvár | 135 | (8) |
| 2021–2023 | Kazincbarcika | 65 | (5) |
| 2023–2026 | FK Csíkszereda | 37 | (1) |
| 2026– | Pécs | 0 | (0) |

International career
| 2012–2014 | Hungary U21 | 3 | (0) |
- * Club domestic league appearances and goals as of 2 August 2025

János Patrik Nagy (born 7 August 1992) is a Hungarian professional footballer who plays as a right-back for Nemzeti Bajnokság III club Pécs.

== Career statistics ==
As of match played 2 August 2025

Appearances and goals by club, season and competition
| Club | Season | League | | | National cup (Note: Includes Magyar Kupa, Cupa României) | | League cup (Note: Includes Ligakupa) | | Other | | Total | |
| Club | Season | Division | Apps | Goals | Apps | Goals | Apps | Goals | Apps | Goals | Apps | Goals |
|---|---|---|---|---|---|---|---|---|---|---|---|---|
| Újpest II | 2010–11 | Nemzeti Bajnokság II | 4 | 0 | — | | — | | — | | 4 | 0 |
| Újpest II | 2012–13 | Nemzeti Bajnokság II | 25 | 1 | — | | — | | — | | 25 | 1 |
| Újpest II | 2012–13 | Nemzeti Bajnokság II | 16 | 0 | — | | — | | — | | 16 | 0 |
| Újpest II | Total | | 45 | 1 | — | | — | | — | | 45 | 1 |
| Újpest | 2011–12 | Nemzeti Bajnokság I | 0 | 0 | 2 | 0 | 1 | 0 | — | | 3 | 0 |
| Újpest | 2012–13 | Nemzeti Bajnokság I | 1 | 0 | 0 | 0 | 3 | 0 | — | | 4 | 0 |
| Újpest | 2013–14 | Nemzeti Bajnokság I | 10 | 0 | 4 | 0 | — | | — | | 14 | 0 |
| Újpest | 2014–15 | Nemzeti Bajnokság I | 2 | 0 | 1 | 0 | 6 | 0 | — | | 9 | 0 |
| Újpest | Total | | 13 | 0 | 7 | 0 | 10 | 0 | — | | 30 | 0 |
| Szigetszentmiklós (loan) | 2013–14 | Nemzeti Bajnokság II | 16 | 0 | 1 | 0 | 3 | 0 | — | | 20 | 0 |
| Siófok (loan) | 2014–15 | Nemzeti Bajnokság II | 14 | 1 | — | | — | | — | | 14 | 1 |
| Siófok (loan) | 2015–16 | Nemzeti Bajnokság II | 22 | 1 | 1 | 0 | — | | — | | 23 | 1 |
| Siófok (loan) | 2016–17 | Nemzeti Bajnokság II | 3 | 0 | — | | — | | — | | 3 | 0 |
| Siófok (loan) | Total | | 39 | 2 | 1 | 0 | — | | — | | 40 | 2 |
| Kaposvár | 2016–17 | Nemzeti Bajnokság III | 27 | 1 | 1 | 0 | — | | — | | 28 | 1 |
| Kaposvár | 2017–18 | Nemzeti Bajnokság III | 22 | 2 | 1 | 0 | — | | — | | 23 | 2 |
| Kaposvár | 2018–19 | Nemzeti Bajnokság II | 25 | 2 | 4 | 0 | — | | — | | 29 | 2 |
| Kaposvár | 2019–20 | Nemzeti Bajnokság I | 32 | 2 | 1 | 0 | — | | — | | 33 | 2 |
| Kaposvár | 2020–21 | Nemzeti Bajnokság II | 29 | 1 | 3 | 0 | — | | — | | 32 | 1 |
| Kaposvár | Total | | 135 | 8 | 10 | 0 | — | | — | | 145 | 8 |
| Kazincbarcika | 2021–22 | Nemzeti Bajnokság III | 37 | 4 | 6 | 1 | — | | — | | 43 | 5 |
| Kazincbarcika | 2022–23 | Nemzeti Bajnokság II | 28 | 1 | 2 | 1 | — | | — | | 30 | 2 |
| Kazincbarcika | Total | | 65 | 5 | 8 | 2 | — | | — | | 73 | 7 |
| FK Csíkszereda | 2023–24 | Liga II | 24 | 1 | 1 | 0 | — | | 2 (Note: Appearances in Liga I promotion/relegation play-offs) | 0 | 27 | 1 |
| FK Csíkszereda | 2024–25 | Liga II | 12 | 0 | 3 | 0 | — | | — | | 15 | 0 |
| FK Csíkszereda | 2025–26 | Liga I | 1 | 0 | 0 | 0 | — | | — | | 1 | 0 |
| FK Csíkszereda | Total | | 37 | 1 | 4 | 0 | — | | 2 | 0 | 43 | 1 |
| Career total | | | 350 | 17 | 31 | 2 | 13 | 0 | 2 | 0 | 396 | 19 |

== Honours ==
Újpest

- Magyar Kupa: 2013–14
- Szuperkupa: 2014
