= Dominik Bíró =

Hungarian footballer

Personal information
- Date of birth: 25 June 1998 (age 28)
- Place of birth: Szekszárd, Hungary
- Height: 1.73 m (5 ft 8 in)
- Position: Left winger

Team information
- Current team: Kaposvár
- Number: 10

Youth career
- 2007–2009: Hőgyész
- 2009–2013: Szekszárd
- 2013–2017: Kaposvár

Senior career*
Years	Team	Apps	(Gls)
2017–2018	Nyíregyháza	0	(0)
2018	→ Nyírbátor (loan)	9	(0)
2018–2024	Kaposvár	155	(18)
2024	Szentlőrinci	5	(0)
2025–	Kaposvár	13	(3)
- * Club domestic league appearances and goals as of 10 June 2025

Dominik Bíró (born 25 June 1998) is a Hungarian professional footballer who plays for Kaposvár.

== Career statistics ==
Appearances and goals by club, season and competition
Club	Season	League			Cup		Europe		Total	
Club	Season	Division	Apps	Goals	Apps	Goals	Apps	Goals	Apps	Goals
Nyírbátor	2017–18	Nemzeti Bajnokság III	9	0	0	0	—		9	0
Kaposvár
Kaposvár	2018–19	Nemzeti Bajnokság II	31	2	3	0	—		34	2
Kaposvár	2019–20	Nemzeti Bajnokság I	3	0	1	0	—		4	0
Kaposvár	Total		34	2	4	0	0	0	38	2
Career total			43	2	4	0	0	0	47	2

Updated to games played as of 30 October 2019.
