= Aurél Farkas =

Hungarian footballer

Personal information
- Date of birth: 31 March 1994 (age 32)
- Place of birth: Budapest, Hungary
- Height: 1.82 m (6 ft 0 in)
- Position: Defensive midfielder

Team information
- Current team: Csákvár
- Number: 14

Youth career
- 2004–2005: Soroksár
- 2005–2009: Csepel
- 2009–2013: Budapest Honvéd

Senior career*
Years	Team	Apps	(Gls)
2013–2014	Szigetszentmiklós	3	(0)
2014	→ Diósd (loan)	14	(0)
2014–2015	ESMTK	25	(0)
2015–2016	Ferencváros II	29	(1)
2016–2017	Szeged-Csanád	17	(1)
2017–2018	Szolnok	32	(2)
2018–2020	Csákvár	39	(1)
2020	Kaposvár	3	(0)
2020–2021	Nyíregyháza	25	(0)
2021–2023	Szeged-Csanád	64	(1)
2023–	Csákvár	78	(2)

International career
2011	Hungary U-17	4	(0)
2013	Hungary U-19	2	(0)
- * Club domestic league appearances and goals as of 31 May 2026

Aurél Farkas (born 31 March 1994) is a Hungarian football midfielder who plays for Csákvár.

== Career statistics ==
As of 17 June 2020

Appearances and goals by club, season and competition
Club	Season	League			Cup		Continental		Other		Total	
Club	Season	Division	Apps	Goals	Apps	Goals	Apps	Goals	Apps	Goals	Apps	Goals
Szigetszentmiklós	2013–14	Nemzeti Bajnokság II	3	0	1	0	—		—		4	0
Diósd	2013–14	Nemzeti Bajnokság III	14	0	0	0	—		—		14	0
ESMTK	2014–15	Nemzeti Bajnokság III	25	0	2	1	—		—		27	1
Ferencváros II	2015–16	Nemzeti Bajnokság III	29	1	—		—		—		29	1
Szeged	2016–17	Nemzeti Bajnokság II	17	1	2	0	—		—		19	1
Szolnok	2017–18	Nemzeti Bajnokság II	32	2	0	0	—		—		32	2
Csákvár	2018–19	Nemzeti Bajnokság II	33	1	1	0	—		—		33	1
Csákvár	2019–20	Nemzeti Bajnokság II	6	0	1	0	—		—		7	0
Csákvár	Total		39	1	2	0	0	0	0	0	41	1
Kaposvár	2019–20	Nemzeti Bajnokság I	3	0	1	0	—		—		4	0
Career total			162	5	8	1	0	0	0	0	170	6
