= Ákos Borbély =

Hungarian footballer (born 2000)

Personal information
- Full name: Ákos Borbély
- Date of birth: 12 June 2000 (age 26)
- Place of birth: Kaposvár, Hungary
- Height: 1.86 m (6 ft 1 in)
- Position: Attacking midfielder

Team information
- Current team: Kaposvár
- Number: 13

Youth career
- 2007–2018: Kaposvár

Senior career*
Years	Team	Apps	(Gls)
2018–	Kaposvár	16	(1)
- * Club domestic league appearances and goals as of 24 June 2020

Ákos Borbély (born 12 June 2000) is a Hungarian professional footballer who plays for Kaposvári Rákóczi FC.

== Career statistics ==
As of 24 June 2020.

Appearances and goals by club, season and competition
Club	Season	League			Cup		Continental		Other		Total	
Club	Season	Division	Apps	Goals	Apps	Goals	Apps	Goals	Apps	Goals	Apps	Goals
Kaposvár	2018–19	Nemzeti Bajnokság II	4	0	5	1	—		0	0	9	1
Kaposvár	2019–20	Nemzeti Bajnokság I	12	1	3	0	—		0	0	15	1
Kaposvár	Total		16	1	8	1	0	0	0	0	24	2
Career total			16	1	8	1	0	0	0	0	24	2
