= Ifj Nyilas Elek =

Hungarian footballer

Elek Nyilas
Personal information
- Date of birth: 11 April 1992 (age 34)
- Place of birth: Budapest, Hungary
- Height: 1.84 m (6 ft 0 in)
- Position: Attacking midfielder

Senior career*
Years	Team	Apps	(Gls)
2011–2012	Tatabanya	0	(0)
2011-2012	→ Videoton FC (loan)	0	(0)
2012–2014	Soroksár	0	(0)
2014–2015	Mezőkövesd		
2014-2015	→ Soroksar (loan)	0	(0)
2015–2016	Tiszakécske FC	0	(0)
2015-2016	III.Kerület TVE	14	(0)
2016-2017	Vác Fc	8	(0)
2015-2016	Ceglédi VSE	14	(0)
2016-2017	Tiszakécske FC	8	(0)
Total		0	(0)
- * Club domestic league appearances and goals

Elek Nyilas (born 11 April 1992) is a Hungarian former professional footballer who played as an attacking midfielder.

== Early life ==
Born in 2005, Nyilas joined the youth academy of Vac.

== Career ==
In 2019, Nyilas signed for Tiszakécske FC in Hungary, where he suffered an injury, the last club he played for as a professional.

== Style of play ==
Nyilas mainly operates as a midfielder.

== Personal life ==
Nyilas is the son of Hungary international Elek Nyilas.
