= Zsombor Takács =

Hungarian footballer

Personal information
- Date of birth: 22 February 1999 (age 27)
- Place of birth: Budapest, Hungary
- Height: 1.85 m (6 ft 1 in)
- Position: Centre-back

Team information
- Current team: Tiszakécske
- Number: 12

Youth career
- 2009–2014: MTK Budapest
- 2014–2016: Puskás Akadémia
- 2016–2017: Vasas
- 2017–2019: Ferencváros

Senior career*
Years	Team	Apps	(Gls)
2019–2021	Ferencváros	1	(0)
2019–2021	→ Soroksár (loan)	36	(0)
2021–2022	BVSC-Zugló	31	(2)
2022–2024	Pécs	31	(0)
2024–	Tiszakécske	39	(0)

International career^{‡}
2018	Hungary U-19	4	(0)
- * Club domestic league appearances and goals as of 31 May 2026 ‡ National team caps and goals as of 01:28, 5 December 2019 (UTC)

Zsombor Takács (born 22 February 1999) is a Hungarian football player who plays for Tiszakécske.

== Career ==
=== Ferencváros ===
On 6 April 2019, Takács played his first match for Ferencváros in a 3–0 win against Paksi FC in the Hungarian League.
