= Tiszakécskei LC =

Hungarian football club

Tiszakécske LC
- Full name: Tiszakécske Labdarugó Club
- Founded: 1950
- Ground: Városi Stadion
- Capacity: 4,500
- Chairman: Attila Hoffman
- Manager: Csaba Pintér
- League: NB II
- 2025–26: 10th
- Website: https://www.tiszakecskefoci.hu
Home colours	Away colours

Tiszakécske Labdarugó Club is a Hungarian football club from the town of Tiszakécske, Hungary. It currently plays in the Nemzeti Bajnokság II, the second tier of Hungarian football.

== History ==
In the 1996–97 season, Tiszakécske finished first in the second division and was promoted to the first division of the Hungarian League. Tiszakécske FC debuted in the 1997–98 season of the Hungarian League and finished fifteenth. The relegation play-offs were lost 1-1, 2–1 against III. Kerületi TVE and the club were relegated.

== Current squad ==
As of 20 February, 2026

Note: Flags indicate national team as defined under FIFA eligibility rules; some limited exceptions apply. Players may hold more than one non-FIFA nationality.

No.	Pos.	Nation	Player
6	DF	HUN	Róbert Csáki
7	FW	BRA	Myke Ramos
9	FW	HUN	Tamás Takács
10	MF	HUN	Emil Horváth
12	DF	HUN	Zsombor Takács
15	MF	HUN	Lucas
17	MF	HUN	Ádám Szekér
18	DF	HUN	Kevin Körmendi (on loan from Kisvárda)
20	FW	HUN	Márton Zámbó
21	DF	HUN	Botond Szekér

No.	Pos.	Nation	Player
22	GK	HUN	Desmond Esery
24	FW	HUN	Erik Kócs-Washburn
26	MF	HUN	Botond Terbe
27	MF	HUN	Ádám Bódi
31	GK	HUN	Ágoston Kiss
33	MF	HUN	József Varga
35	DF	SRB	Valentin Visinka
38	FW	HUN	Bence Sós
50	DF	HUN	Dávid Valencsik
51	FW	HUN	Ádám Gyenes
77	MF	HUN	Bence Pataki

=== Out on loan ===
Note: Flags indicate national team as defined under FIFA eligibility rules; some limited exceptions apply. Players may hold more than one non-FIFA nationality.

No.	Pos.	Nation	Player
8	MF	UKR	Maksym Burdika (at Tiszafüred VSE until 30 June 2026)

== Non-playing staff ==
=== Board of directors ===
Position	Name
President	(Hungary) Atilla Hoffman

=== Coaches ===
==== First team ====
Position	Name
Head Coach	(Hungary) Pál Balogh
Assistant Coach	(Hungary) Csaba Pintér
Goalkeeper Coach	(Hungary) László Pleskó
Fitness Coach	(Hungary) András Vég
Masseur 1	(Hungary) Gábor Maczkó
Masseur 2	(Hungary) Tamás Jelenfi
Technical director	(Hungary) Tibor Kàli
Club doctor 1	(Hungary) Dr.Alfréd Forgàcs
Video analyst	(Hungary) Làszló Szabó
Kit manager	(Hungary) Béla Pálinkas

==== Second team ====
Position	Name
Head Coach	(Hungary) Gàbor Bagi
Goalkeeper Coach	(Hungary) József Somogyi
Masseur 2	(Hungary) Tamás Jelenfi
Technical director	(Hungary) Tibor Kàli
Club doctor 1	(Hungary) Dr.Alfréd Forgàcs
Video analyst	(Hungary) Làszló Szabó
Kit manager	(Hungary) Béla Pálinkás

== Stadium ==
=== First pitch ===
The first league football match of Tiszakécske FC was announced to be played on 27 July 1997 against Diósgyőri VTK. The old stadium capacity was 9,000 people, from which 4500 was seats and 5500 stands. The record attendance is 9,000 person against Újpest TE on 28 February 1998.

== Honours ==
=== Domestic ===
Hungary

- Nemzeti Bajnokság II (2nd tier)
  - Winners (1): 1996–97
- Nemzeti Bajnokság III (3rd tier)
  - Winners (4): 1992–93, 2017–18, 2020–21, 2024–25
- Megyei Bajnokság I (4th tier)
  - Winners (6): 1960–61, 1976–77, 1991–92, 2016–17, 2023–24, 2024–25
- Megyei Bajnokság II (5th tier)
  - Winners (3): 1975–76, 1984–85, 2002–03
- Megyei Bajnokság III (6th tier)
  - Winners (1): 2000–01

== Seasons ==
=== League positions ===
As of 26 July 2025

- Between 2003–04 and 2004–05 the fifth tier league called Reg.I.
- Between 2001–02 and 2002–03 the sixth tier league called Reg.II.
- In 2000–01 the seventh tier league called Reg.III.
- In 1998–99 the second tier league called NB I/B.

=== Table ===
The table below shows the seasons of Tiszakécske.

Season	Tier	Club's name	Position	Pts
1939–40	4	Újkécskei MOVE	5 / 10	19
1940–41	5	Újkékcsei MOVE	5 / 8	11
1945–46	3	Újkécskei SE	2 / 12	23
1946–47	4	Újkécskei SE	4 / 7	10
1947–48	4	Újkécskei SE	5 / 8	15
1948–49	4	Újkécskei SE	11 / 16	
1949–50	4	Újkécskei KIOSz	3 / 16	41
1950	4	Tiszakécskei Sz. KIOSz	4 / 16	19
1951	3	Tiszakécske SK	7 / 12	20
1952	3	Tiszakécskei SK	14 / 14	3
1953	3	Tiszakécskei SK	5 / 12	23
1954	3	Tiszakécskei SK	10 / 14	18
1955	3	Tiszakécskei Traktor	9 / 14	20
1956	3	Tiszakécskei Bástya	12 / 16	23
1957	3	Tiszakécskei SK	4 / 7	12
1957–58	3	Tiszakécske SK	11 / 16	28
1958–59	4	Tiszakécske	14 / 16	18
1959–60	5	Tiszakécske	5 / 9	13
1960–61	5	Tiszakécske	1 / 12	37
1961–62	4	Tiszakécske	9 / 17	29
1962–63	4	Tiszakécske	10 / 16	24
1963	5	Tiszakécske	10 / 14	9
1964	5	Tiszakécskei Permetezőgépgyár	9 / 16	22
1965	5	Tiszakécskei Permetezőgépgyár	10 / 14	18
1966	5	Tiszakécske	7 / 16	26
1967	5	Tiszakécske	9 / 16	29
1968	5	Tiszakécske	12 / 18	25
1969	5	Tiszakécske	10 / 16	25
1970	5	Tiszakécske	2 / 16	21
1970–71	5	Tiszakécske	2 / 15	32
1971–72	5	Tiszakécske	16 / 18	29
1972–73	5	Tiszakécske	12 / 17	20
1973–74	5	Tiszakécske	14 / 16	19
1974–75	5	Tiszakécske	8 / 14	26
1975–76	6	Tiszakécske	1 / 12	36
1976–77	5	Tiszakécske	1 / 13	41
1977–78	4	Tiszakécskei KSK	15 / 20	32
1978–79	3	Tiszakécske	7 / 20	47
1979–80	3	Tiszakécske	7 / 18	39
1980–81	3	Tiszakécskei KSE	4 / 18	43
1981–82	3	Tiszakécske	15 / 16	19
1982–83	4	Tiszakécske	9 / 16	30
1983–84	4	Tiszakécske	15 / 16	17
1984–85	5	Tiszakécske	1 / 16	46
1985–86	4	Tiszakécske	3 / 16	39
1986–87	4	Tiszakécske	3 / 17	44
1987–88	4	Tiszakécske	13 / 16	21
1988–89	4	Tiszakécske	11 / 16	25
1989–90	4	Tiszakécske	13 / 16	34
1990–91	4	Tiszakécske	3 / 16	44
1991–92	4	Tiszakécske	1 / 16	51
1992–93	3	Tiszakécske LC	1 / 16	51
1993–94	2	Tiszakécskei FC	5 / 16	34
1994–95	2	Tiszakécske FC	4 / 16	48
1995–96	2	Tiszakécske FC	2 / 16	60
1996–97	2	Tiszakécske FC-Eurobusz	1 / 16	56
1997–98	1	Tiszakécskei FC	15 / 18	32
1998–99	2	Tiszakécske FC	11 / 20	52
2000–01	7	Tiszakécskei VSE	1 / 14	62
2001–02	6	Tiszakécskei VSE	7 / 16	47
2002–03	6	Tiszakécskei VSE	1 / 14	72
2003–04	5	Tiszakécske VSE	10 / 16	35
2004–05	5	Tiszakécskei VSE	5 / 16	48
2005–06	4	Tiszakécse VSE	12 / 16	34
2006–07	4	Tiszakécske	3 / 16	59
2007–08	4	Tiszakécskei VSE	11 / 16	34
2008–09	4	Tiszakécskei VSE	15 / 15	12
2009–10	5	Tiszakécske VSE	10 / 16	35
2010–11	5	Tiszakécske VSE	4 / 16	60
2011–12	5	Tiszakécskei VSE-Andritz Kft	8 / 16	44
2012–13	4	Tiszakécskei VSE-Avdritz Kft.	13 / 13	16
2013–14	4	Tiszakécske VSE	14 / 16	13
2014–15	4	Tiszakécske VSE	6 / 15	51
2015–16	4	Duna Aszfalt Tiszakécskei VSE	2 / 15	71
2016–17	4	Duna Aszfalt Tiszakécskei VSE	1 / 15	82
2017–18	3	Duna Aszfalt Tiszakécskei VSE	1 / 16	71
2018–19	2	Duna Aszfalt Tiszakécskei VSE	15 / 20	43
2019–20	2	Duna Aszfalt TLC	18 / 20	26
2020–21	3	Tiszakécskei LC	1 / 20	94
2021–22	2	Tiszakécskei LC	13 / 20	42
2022–23	2	Tiszakécskei LC	11 / 20	46
2023–24	2	Tiszakécskei LC	16 / 18	34
2024–25	3	Tiszakécskei LC	1 / 16	67
2025–26	2	Tiszakécskei LC	10 / 16	35

== Name changes ==
- 1945: Újkécskei MOVE
- 1945–1949: Újkécskei SE
- 1949–1950: Újkécskei KIOSz
- 1950–1951: Tiszakécskei Sz. KIOSz
- 1951–1955: Tiszakécskei SK
- 1955–1956: Tiszakécskei Traktor
- 1956–1957: Tiszakécskei Bástya
- 1957–1960: Tiszakécskei SK
- 1960–1975: Tiszakécskei Permetezőgépgyár
- 1975–1980: Tiszakécskei KSK
- 1980–1993: Tiszakécske LC
- 1993–1996: Tiszakécskei Futball Club
- 1996–1997: Tiszakécske FC-Eurobusz
- 1997–1999: Tiszakécske FC
- 1999–2000: Affiliated with Tiszakécske FC-Cegléd
- 2000–2011: Tiszakécske VSE
- 2011–2013: Tiszakécske VSE- Andritz Kft
- 2013–2015: Tiszakécske VSE
- 2015–2019: Duna Aszfalt Tiszakécskei VSE
- 2019–2020: Duna Aszfalt TLC
- 2020–2021: Duna Aszfalt TVSE
- 2021– Tiszakécskei LC

== Notable players ==
Had international caps for their respective countries. Players whose name is listed in bold represented their countries while playing for Tiszakécske FC.

- (Hungary) **Lajos Szűcs**
- (Hungary) Gábor Maczkó
- (Hungary) Mihály Balla
- (Hungary) János Zováth
- (Liberia) **Mle Collins**
- (Algeria) Meziane Touati
- (Algeria) Mohamed Zait
- (Senegal) Kean Mansour
- (Hungary) Gábor Ézsiás
- (Hungary) Tibor Ézsiás
- (Hungary) Elek Nyilas
- (Hungary) Tibor Makra
- (Romania) Nelu Besserman
- (Romania) Emil Şerban
- (Romania) József Izsák
- (Romania) Mario Nedela
- (Romania) Marcel Vasile Câmpian
- (Romania) (Hungary) Daniel Usvát
- (Socialist Federal Republic of Yugoslavia) Boris Vidaković
- (Socialist Federal Republic of Yugoslavia) (Hungary) Robert Szántó
- (Hungary) Zsolt Nagy
- (Hungary) András Tóth
- (Hungary) Gábor Bagi
- (Hungary) Gábor László
- (Hungary) Dániel László
- (Hungary) Viktor Szekeres
- (Hungary) Géza Szőke
- (Hungary) József Domonics
- (Hungary) Pèter Fazekas
- (Hungary) Zoltán Fazekas
- (Hungary) Viktor Németh
- (Hungary) Zsolt Hegedűs
- (Hungary) Tibor Békési
- (Hungary) Ifj Tibor Békési
- (Hungary) János Tompa
- (Hungary) József Somogyi
- (Hungary) László Balla
- (Hungary) István Bagi
- (Hungary) Zoltán Bánföldi
- (Hungary) Zsolt Anka
- (Hungary) Csaba Szabó
- (Hungary) Béla Pálinkás
- (Hungary) Jenő Mike
- (Hungary) Szilárd Sípos
- (Hungary) Pèter Unyatinszky
- (Netherlands) (Hungary) Dávid Kiprich
- (Serbia) Slobodan Markovič
- (Serbia) Zeljko Belecan
- (Serbia) Stefan Vladul
- (Hungary) **András Huszti**
- (Austria) (Hungary) Dávid Mihaly
- (Slovakia) Máté Köböl
- (Brazil) Fábio Guarú
- (Hungary) Imre Jelenfi
- (Hungary) Tibor Káli
- (Hungary) András Habony
- (Hungary) Ádám Holczer
- (Hungary) Ifj Nyilas Elek
- (Hungary) János Antal
- (Hungary) Atilla Hoffman
- (Hungary) László Török
- (Hungary) János Forgó
- (Hungary) Atilla Belvon
- (Hungary) Imrei László
- (Socialist Federal Republic of Yugoslavia) Zoran Gligorovic
- (Hungary) József Tóth
- (Hungary) László Major

== Sponsorship ==
Period	Kit manufacturer	Shirt sponsor
1980–85	Senior	Tiszakécske
1985–89	Senior	Coca-Cola
1989–90	Adidas	DARIMEX
1990–91	Adidas	DIRAMEX
1991–92	Umbro	Dafke
1992–93	Adidas	Holymex
1993–94	Masita	Diramex
1994–95	Adidas	Jorgos Travel Dafke
1996–97	AEM	Jorgos Travel
1997–98	Erreà	Soproni
1998–99	Reusch	Soproni
1999–00	Reusch	none
2000–08	Erreà	City of Tiszakécske
2008–18	Nike	Duna Aszfalt
2018–24	2Rule	Duna Aszfalt
2024–26	Nike	Duna Aszfalt
2026–	Macron	Duna Aszfalt
