= Kaposvári Rákóczi FC =

Hungarian football club

Kaposvár
- Full name: Kaposvári Rákóczi FC
- Nicknames: Kraci, Rákóczi
- Founded: 15 August 1923; 103 years ago
- Ground: Rákóczi Stadion, Kaposvár
- Capacity: 7,000 (4,500 seated)
- Chairman: Ferenc Illés
- Manager: Tibor Székely
- League: NB III; Southwest
- 2023–24: NB III; Southwest, 4th of 16
- Website: rakoczifc.hu
Home colours	Away colours

Kaposvári Rákóczi FC is a football club in Kaposvár, Hungary. Their home stadium is Rákóczi Stadion. The team is named after Francis II Rákóczi, a Transylvanian prince and national hero and they are also often referred to be the nickname Somogyiak, referring to Somogy County, where the team plays.

== History ==
=== 1923–2003 ===
The team was formed on 15 August 1923 as the Rákóczi Sport Club by workers of the local Mezőgazdasági Ipari Részvénytársaság sugar factory. Though they originally played as amateurs, they played their first professional match against MÁV I. the following year. From this time forward the team would bounce back between the NB III and NB II.

In 1941 the team awaited the arrival of István Avar, but his debut with the team was delayed by the second world war. After the war, the team really got going in 1960, where they won the NB III under the name Kaposvár Kinizsi.

In 1970 the team took back its classic name, Rákóczi, but in 1971 they were relegated back to the NB III. They would put together a successful season afterward though, and return to NB II. At this time some good young talent joined from the team's youth organization, including Bőzsöny, Savanyó, and Hegedűs the goalkeeper, and in 1973 Imre Mathesz took the helm as head coach. The team would add more key players and would finish 3 points behind Szeged for second place and the right to enter NB I.

The team's first NB I. match was played against Vasas SC before 22,000 fans at Rákóczi Stadion. The Somogyiak won the match 2–0, behind two goals from Győző Burcsa. By 2006, however, Burcsa left for Székesfehérvár and the team finished the 1975–1976 campaign in 13th place. In 1976–1977 they finished 14th and by the next season they were relegated with a 17th-place finish. They wouldn't have to wait long to return, however. They finished in 3rd place the following year in the NB II. and won it outright in 1979–1980 with a six-point lead over Szombathelyi Haladás.

The 1980–1981 season had a few noteworthy matches. On 9 August they beat Pécs 2–1 before a crowd of 12,000 at home. Later in the season they held on to a 3–3 draw against Újpest in Budapest. Nevertheless, the team would end the season in 16th place and again face relegation. They would drop as far as the third division before finally returning to the NB I. again after winning the second division in 1987. This would be their final season in NB I. until the next millennium. Besides the first NB I. match between two teams from Somogy county (a 1–3 loss against Siófok FC) the year was mostly forgettable as Rákóczi finished in last place.

The rest of the '80s and '90s were spent entirely in the II. and III. divisions, though not without talent. In 1995 they won the NB III. with a goal difference of 76–11. They continued to be successful in the NB II. László Prukner became the head coach in the summer of 2003, but the team lost several key players in the same year. The fans were worried that they would again slide into the III. division.

=== 2010s ===
On 10 May 2014, Kaposvár were relegated after losing 2–0 to Videoton in the 28th round of the 2013–14 Hungarian League season.

After the relegation, in the 2014–2015 season, they were relegated from the NB II. And they could not start in the NB III due to license problems, therefore the MLSZ relegated them to the Somogy county first division. In the 2015–2016 season they won the league unbeaten, therefore they were promoted to the NB III.

In the 2016–2017 season, they finished in third place under Tamás Artner's control. The next season Kaposvár got a new coach: Róbert Waltner in the 2017–2018 season they won the third division with him.

In the 2018–2019 season, after 5 years, Kaposvár was promoted (as a rookie) to the NB I after they finished second in the NB II.

In the 8th round of the 2018–19 Magyar Kupa season Kaposvár eliminated title holders Újpest FC. However, in the round of 16 Kaposvár were eliminated by Budaörsi SC on 1–2 aggregate.

=== 2020s ===
On 6 June 2020, Kaposvár were relegated to the Nemzeti Bajnokság II after Paksi FC beat Mezőkövesdi SE on the 27th match day of the 2019–20 Nemzeti Bajnokság I. After the 2020–21 Nemzeti Bajnokság II season, they were relegated again to Nemzeti Bajnokság III.

== Players ==
=== Current squad ===
As of 14 February 2022

Note: Flags indicate national team as defined under FIFA eligibility rules; some limited exceptions apply. Players may hold more than one non-FIFA nationality.

No.	Pos.	Nation	Player
—	GK	HUN	Péter Ipacs
—	GK	HUN	Krisztián Pogacsics
—	DF	HUN	Ádám Böndi
—	DF	HUN	Péter Czuczi (on loan from Szentlőrinc)
—	DF	HUN	Tamás Fehérvári
—	DF	HUN	Krisztián Kaszás
—	DF	HUN	Gergő Lakatos
—	MF	HUN	Alex Balog
—	MF	HUN	Ákos Borbély
—	MF	HUN	Mátyás Gál
—	MF	HUN	Máté Grabarics
—	MF	HUN	Dániel Harsányi
—	MF	HUN	Máté Heil
—	MF	HUN	Szilárd Kálmán

No.	Pos.	Nation	Player
—	MF	HUN	Viktor Ladányi
—	MF	HUN	Balázs Országh
—	MF	HUN	Tamás Palkovics
—	MF	HUN	Norbert Pintér
—	MF	HUN	Ádám Szederkényi
—	MF	HUN	Dávid Zólyomi
—	MF	HUN	Dávid Zvara
—	FW	HUN	Dominik Bíró
—	FW	HUN	Milán Ekker
—	FW	HUN	Buda Jancsó
—	FW	HUN	Kristóf Kondor
—	FW	HUN	Milán Mayer
—	FW	HUN	Tamás Orsós
—	FW	SRB	Stefan Vladul

== Honours ==
- Nemzeti Bajnokság II:
  - Winners (2): 1979–80, 1986–87
- Nemzeti Bajnokság III:
  - Winners (11): 1941–42, 1948–49, 1958–59, 1960–61, 1973–74, 1982–83, 1985–86, 1991–92, 1994–95, 2011–12, 2017–18
- Somogy megyei Kupa
  - Winners (1): 2016
- Somogy county's Football Championship – First Division (Megye I)
  - Champions (1): 2016

== Managers ==
- (Hungary) László Prukner (2001), (1 July 2004 – 30 June 2010), (14 June 2012 – 6 Jan 2014), (January, 2015 – July, 2015)
- (Hungary) Tibor Sisa (9 June 2010 – 27 May 2012)
- (Romania) Tibor Selymes (7 Jan 2014 – 30 June 2014)
- (Hungary) Gábor Márton (1 July 2014 – January 2015)
- (Hungary) László Pusztai (August, 2015 – May, 2016)
- (Hungary) László Házi (May, 2016–20 November 2016)
- (Hungary) Tamás Artner (27 December 2016 – 26 September 2017)
- (Hungary) Róbert Waltner (28 September 2017–)
- Tamás Nagy (2021 – 2022)

== Seasons ==
The table below shows the seasons of Kaposvári Rákóczi FC.

Season	Tier	Club's name	Position	Pts
1925–26	3	Kaposvári Rákóczi SC	0 / 6	
1926–27	2	Kaposvári Rákóczi SC	7 / 12	19
1927–28	3	Kaposvári Rákóczi SC	2 / 6	13
1928–29	3	Kaposvári Rákóczi SC	0 / 7	-
1929–30	2	Kaposvári Rákóczi SC	9 / 12	18
1930–31	2	Kaposvári Rákóczi SC	9 / 12	16
1931–32	2	Kaposvári Rákóczi SC	6 / 12	25
1932–33	2	Kaposvári Rákóczi SC	5 / 10	
1933–34	2	Kaposvári Rákóczi SC	9 / 11	8
1934–35	3	Kaposvári Rákóczi SC	7 / 7	
1935–36	2	Kaposvári Rákóczi AC	7 / 12	21
1936–37	2	Kaposvári Rákóczi AC	8 / 12	18
1937–38	2	Kaposvári Rákóczi AC	4 / 12	27
1938–39	3	Kaposvári Rákóczi AC	8 / 12	18
1939–40	3	Kaposvári Rákóczi AC	7 / 12	21
1940–41	4	Kaposvári Rákóczi AC	1 / 14	43
1941–42	3	Kaposvári Rákóczi AC	1 / 12	31
1942–43	2	Kaposvári Rákóczi AC	2 / 14	35
1943–44	2	Kaposvári Rákóczi AC	4 / 16	38
1944–45	2	Kaposvári Rákóczi AC	5 / 14	8
1944–45	2	Kaposvári Rákóczi AC	0 / 12	
1945–46	2	Kaposvári Rákóczi AC	0 / 12	
1946–47	3	Kaposvári Rákóczi AC	3 / 12	26
1947–48	3	Kaposvári Rákóczi AC	2 / 14	42
1948–49	3	Kaposvári Rákóczi AC	1 / 16	49
1949–50	2	Kaposvári DSK	6 / 16	32
1950	2	Kaposvári ÉDOSz	15 / 16	11
1951	3	Kaposvári Kinizsi	3 / 14	42
1952	3	Kaposvári Kinizsi	1 / 14	48
1953	3	Kaposvári Kinizsi	1 / 12	40
1954	3	Kaposvári Kinizsi	1 / 16	50
1955	2	Kaposvári Kinizsi	12 / 16	27
1956	2	Kaposvári Rákóczi AC	8 / 16	27
1957–58	2	Kaposvári Kinizsi	9 / 19	38
1958–59	2	Kaposvári Kinizsi	14 / 16	27
1959–60	3	Kaposvári Kinizsi SK	2 / 17	38
1960–61	3	Kaposvári Kinizsi	1 / 16	43
1961–62	2	Kaposvári Kinizsi	11 / 16	24
1962–63	2	Kaposvári Kinizsi	15 / 16	19
1963	4	Kaposvári Kinizsi	6 / 16	17
1964	4	Kaposvári Kinizsi	1 / 16	47
1965	3	Kaposvári Kinizsi	11 / 18	32
1966	3	Kaposvári Kinizsi	16 / 18	24
1967	3	Kaposvári Kinizsi	10 / 16	29
1968	3	Kaposvári Kinizsi	12 / 16	27
1969	3	Kaposvári Kinizsi	7 / 16	30
1970	3	Kaposvári Rákóczi SC	6 / 16	15
1970–71	3	Kaposvári Rákóczi SC	16 / 16	13
1971–72	4	Kaposvári Rákóczi SC	1 / 16	44
1972–73	3	Kaposvári Rákóczi SC	4 / 16	33
1973–74	3	Kaposvári Rákóczi SC	1 / 16	44
1974–75	2	Kaposvári Rákóczi SC	2 / 20	47
1975–76	1	Kaposvári Rákóczi SC	13 / 16	24
1976–77	1	Kaposvári Rákóczi SC	14 / 18	27
1977–78	1	Kaposvári Rákóczi SC	17 / 18	23
1978–79	2	Kaposvári Rákóczi	3 / 20	47
1979–80	2	Kaposvári Rákóczi SC	1 / 20	61
1980–81	1	Kaposvári Rákóczi SC	16 / 18	24
1981–82	2	Kaposvári Rákóczi SC	7 / 16	34
1982–83	3	Kaposvári Rákóczi SC	1 / 16	41
1983–84	3	Kaposvári Rákóczi SC	1 / 16	46
1984–85	3	Kaposvári Rákóczi	2 / 16	44
1985–86	3	Kaposvári Rákóczi SC	1 / 16	48
1986–87	2	Kaposvári Rákóczi SC	1 / 20	52
1987–88	1	Kaposvári Rákóczi FC	16 / 16	17
1988–89	2	Kaposvári Rákóczi FC	14 / 16	35
1989–90	3	Kaposvári Rákóczi FC	2 / 16	70
1990–91	3	Kaposvári Rákóczi	2 / 16	39
1991–92	3	Kaposvári Rákóczi	1 / 16	45
1992–93	2	Kaposvári Rákóczi FC	15 / 16	22
1993–94	3	Kaposvári Rákóczi FC	3 / 16	38
1994–95	3	Rákóczi-Kaposcukor FC	1 / 16	80
1995–96	2	Rákóczi-Kaposcukor FC	3 / 16	58
1996–97	2	Rákóczi-Kaposcukor FC	5 / 16	49
1997–98	2	Rákóczi Kaposcukor FC	6 / 20	55
1998–99	2	Rákóczi Kaposcukor FC	14 / 20	47
1999–00	2	Rákóczi FC Contimex	5 / 20	65
2000	2	Kaposvári Rákóczi FC	2 / 7	21
2000–01	2	Kaposvári Rákóczi FC	6 / 12	32
2001–02	2	Kaposvári Rákóczi	3 / 12	56
2001–02	2	Kaposvári Rákóczi	4 / 12	38
2002–03	2	Kaposvári Rákóczi	7 / 20	51
2003–04	2	NABI-Kaposvári Rákóczi FC	3 / 18	61
2004–05	1	NABI-Kaposvári Rákóczi FC	12 / 16	34
2005–06	1	Kaposvári Rákóczi FC	7 / 16	37
2006–07	1	Kaposvári Rákóczi FC	7 / 16	41
2007–08	1	Gabona Trans-Kaposvári Rákóczi FC	6 / 16	51
2008–09	1	Gabona Trans Kaposvári Rákóczi FC	9 / 16	40
2009–10	1	Kaposvári Rákóczi FC	12 / 16	32
2010–11	1	Kaposvári Rákóczi FC	7 / 16	43
2011–12	1	Kaposvári Rákóczi FC	10 / 16	35
2012–13	1	Kaposvári Rákóczi FC	11 / 16	37
2013–14	1	Kaposvári Rákóczi FC	16 / 16	19
2014–15	2	Kaposvári Rákóczi FC	16 / 16	23
2015–16	4	Kaposvári Rákóczi-BFLA	1 / 18	89
2016–17	3	Kaposvári Rákóczi FC	3 / 18	64
2017–18	3	Kaposvári Rákóczi FC	1 / 16	70
2018–19	2	Kaposvári Rákóczi FC	2 / 20	74
2019–20	1	Kaposvári Rákóczi FC	12 / 12	14
2020–21	2	Kaposvári Rákóczi FC	19 / 20	32
2021–22	3	Kaposvári Rákóczi FC	10 / 20	53
2022–23	3	Kaposvári Rákóczi FC	8 / 20	60
2023–24	3	Kaposvári Rákóczi FC	4 / 16	58
2024–25	3	Kaposvári Rákóczi FC	4 / 16	62
2025–26	3	Kaposvári Rákóczi FC	3 / 16	63
