= 2019–20 Nemzeti Bajnokság I =

Nemzeti Bajnokság I
- Season: 2019–20
- Dates: 3 August 2019 – 27 June 2020
- Champions: Ferencváros
- Relegated: Kaposvár; Debrecen
- Champions League: Ferencváros
- Europa League: Fehérvár; Puskás Akadémia; Honvéd
- Matches: 71
- Goals: 205 (2.89 per match)
- Top goalscorer: András Radó (13 goals)
- Biggest home win: Fehérvár 5–1 Diósgyőr
- Biggest away win: Kaposvár 0–6 Zalaegerszeg
- Highest scoring: Debrecen 1–6 Ferencváros
- Highest attendance: 18,759
- Lowest attendance: 1,022
- Total attendance: 259,067
- Average attendance: 3,691

The 2019–20 Nemzeti Bajnokság I (also known as 2019–20 OTP Bank Liga), also known as NB I, was the 121st season of top-tier football in Hungary. The league was officially named OTP Bank Liga for sponsorship reasons. Ferencváros were the defending champions. The season was postponed on 16 March 2020 due to the COVID-19 pandemic and resumed on 23 May.

== Teams ==
MTK Budapest and Szombathelyi Haladás finished the 2018–19 Nemzeti Bajnokság I in the last two places and thus were relegated to NB II division.

The two relegated teams were replaced with the top two teams in 2018–19 Nemzeti Bajnokság II, champion Zalaegerszeg and runner-up Kaposvár, each having the required licence for top-division play.

=== Stadium and locations ===
Following is the list of clubs competed in the league this season, with their location, stadium and stadium capacity.

Team	Location	Stadium	Capacity	Ref
Debrecen	Debrecen	Nagyerdei Stadion	20,340	
Diósgyőr	Miskolc	Diósgyőri Stadion	15,325	
Fehérvár	Székesfehérvár	MOL Aréna Sóstó	14,201	
Ferencváros	Budapest (Ferencváros)	Groupama Aréna	22,000	
Honvéd	Budapest (Kispest)	Bozsik Aréna (Note: Budapest Honvéd play their home matches at the Hidegkuti Nándor Stadion due to the reconstruction of their home stadium, Bozsik Stadion.)	10,000	
Kaposvár	Kaposvár	Rákóczi Stadion	7,000	
Kisvárda	Kisvárda	Várkerti Stadion	2,850	
Mezőkövesd	Mezőkövesd	Városi Stadion	4,183	
Puskás Akadémia	Felcsút	Pancho Aréna	3,816	
Paks	Paks	Fehérvári úti Stadion	6,150	
Újpest	Budapest (Újpest)	Szusza Ferenc Stadion	13,501	
Zalaegerszeg	Zalaegerszeg	ZTE Aréna	11,200	

Debrecen	Diósgyőr	Fehérvár	Ferencváros
Nagyerdei Stadion; UEFA Category 4 Stadium	Diósgyőri Stadion; UEFA Category 4 Stadium	MOL Aréna Sóstó; UEFA Category 4 Stadium	Groupama Aréna; UEFA Category 4 Stadium
Capacity: 20,340	Capacity: 15,325	Capacity: 14,201	Capacity: 22,000
Honvéd	Location of teams in 2019–20 Nemzeti Bajnokság I Location of Budapest teams		Kaposvár
Hidegkuti Nándor Stadion; UEFA Category 3 Stadium	Location of teams in 2019–20 Nemzeti Bajnokság I Location of Budapest teams		Rákóczi Stadion
Capacity: 5,322	Location of teams in 2019–20 Nemzeti Bajnokság I Location of Budapest teams		Capacity: 4,500
Kisvárda	Location of teams in 2019–20 Nemzeti Bajnokság I Location of Budapest teams		Mezőkövesd
Várkerti Stadion	Location of teams in 2019–20 Nemzeti Bajnokság I Location of Budapest teams		Városi-Stadion
Capacity: 2,850	Location of teams in 2019–20 Nemzeti Bajnokság I Location of Budapest teams		Capacity: 4,183
Paks	Puskás Akadémia	Újpest	Zalaegerszeg
Fehérvári úti Stadion	Pancho Aréna; UEFA Category 2 Stadium	Szusza Ferenc Stadion	ZTE Arena
Capacity: 6,150	Capacity: 3,816	Capacity: 13,501	Capacity: 11,200

=== Personnel and kits ===
All teams are obligated to have the logo of the league sponsor OTP Bank as well as the Nemzeti Bajnokság I logo on the right sleeve of their shirt. Since February 2019, all teams participating in the NB I are sponsored by the national betting office Tippmix.

Note: Flags indicate national team as has been defined under FIFA eligibility rules. Players and Managers may hold more than one non-FIFA nationality.

Team	Chairman	Head coach	Captain	Kit manufacturer	Sponsors
Debrecen	(Hungary) Gábor Szima	(Hungary) Elemér Kondás	(Hungary) Dániel Tőzsér	(Germany) Adidas	Grand Casino
Diósgyőr	(Hungary) Gergely Sántha	(Hungary) Tamás Feczkó	(Hungary) Bence Iszlai	(Hungary) 2Rule	Borsodi
Fehérvár	(Hungary) István Garancsi	(Spain) Joan Carrillo	(Hungary) Roland Juhász	(Germany) Adidas	MOL
Ferencváros	(Hungary) Gábor Kubatov	(Ukraine) Serhii Rebrov	(Hungary) Gergő Lovrencsics	(United States) Nike	Magyar Telekom
Honvéd	(Hungary)	(Hungary) István Pisont	(Bosnia and Herzegovina) Đorđe Kamber	(Italy) Macron	Tippmix
Kaposvár	(Hungary)	(Hungary) Róbert Waltner	(Hungary) Dávid Hegedűs	(Italy) Zeus	
Kisvárda	(Hungary) Attila Révész	(Hungary) Tamás Bódog	(Brazil) Lucas	(Germany) Adidas	MasterGood
Mezőkövesd	(Hungary) András Tállai	(Hungary) Attila Kuttor	(Hungary) Tamás Cseri	(Germany) Adidas	Cronus, Zsóry Bath
Paks	(Hungary) János Süli	(Hungary) Gábor Osztermájer	(Hungary) Zsolt Gévay	(Germany) Jako	
Puskás Akadémia	(Hungary) Lőrinc Mészáros	(Slovakia) Zsolt Hornyák	(Hungary) Lajos Hegedűs	(Hungary) 2Rule	Mészáros és Mészáros
Újpest	(Belgium) Roland Duchâtelet	(Serbia) Predrag Rogan	(Hungary) Róbert Litauszki	(Germany) Puma	Volkswagen Centrum
Zalaegerszeg	(Hungary) Gábor Végh	(Hungary) Gábor Márton	(Hungary) Benjamin Babati	(Hungary) 2Rule	ZÁÉV

== League table ==
=== Standings ===
Pos	Team	Pld	W	D	L	GF	GA	GD	Pts	Qualification or relegation
1	Ferencváros (C)	33	23	7	3	58	24	+34	76	Qualification for the Champions League first qualifying round
2	Fehérvár	33	18	9	6	56	29	+27	63	Qualification for the Europa League first qualifying round
3	Puskás Akadémia	33	14	12	7	52	41	+11	54	Qualification for the Europa League first qualifying round
4	Mezőkövesd	33	14	8	11	42	31	+11	50	
5	Honvéd	33	12	8	13	36	44	−8	44	Qualification for the Europa League first qualifying round (Note: Budapest Honvéd qualified for the Europa League first qualifying round by winning the 2019–20 Magyar Kupa.)
6	Újpest	33	12	7	14	45	45	0	43	
7	Zalaegerszeg	33	11	10	12	51	44	+7	43	
8	Kisvárda	33	12	6	15	42	43	−1	42	
9	Diósgyőr	33	12	5	16	40	52	−12	41	
10	Paks	33	11	8	14	46	53	−7	41	
11	Debrecen (R)	33	11	6	16	48	57	−9	39	Relegation to the Nemzeti Bajnokság II
12	Kaposvár (R)	33	4	2	27	27	80	−53	14	Relegation to the Nemzeti Bajnokság II

Source: Hungarian Football Federation (in Hungarian), Soccerway
Rules for classification: 1) Points; 2) Matches won; 3) Goal difference; 4) Goals scored; 5) Head-to-head points; 6) Head-to-head goal difference; 7) Head-to-head away goals scored; 8) Fair play ranking; 9) Drawing of lots.
(C) Champions; (R) Relegated

=== Positions by round ===
The table lists the positions of teams after each week of matches. In order to preserve chronological evolvements, any postponed matches are not included to the round at which they were originally scheduled, but added to the full round they were played immediately afterwards.

Team ╲ Round	1	2	3	4	5	6	7	8	9	10	11	12	13	14	15	16	17	18	19	20	21	22	23	24	25	26	27	28	29	30	31	32	33
Debrecen	6	3	3	3	3	4	6	8	6	7	6	7	9	8	8	8	7	8	8	6	7	8	9	7	8	9	11	11	11	11	11	11	11
Diósgyőr	3	5	9	10	12	9	12	11	11	10	9	9	8	9	9	9	8	5	5	7	6	6	5	5	5	4	4	5	5	5	6	7	9
Fehérvár	1	1	1	1	1	1	1	1	1	1	1	1	3	2	2	2	2	2	2	2	2	2	2	2	2	2	2	2	2	2	2	2	2
Ferencváros	7	9	7	9	7	5	2	3	2	3	3	2	1	1	1	1	1	1	1	1	1	1	1	1	1	1	1	1	1	1	1	1	1
Honvéd	8	12	12	11	10	11	10	10	8	5	5	5	5	5	6	6	5	6	6	5	5	5	6	6	6	6	6	6	6	6	7	5	5
Kaposvár	11	11	11	12	11	12	11	12	12	12	12	12	12	12	12	12	12	12	12	12	12	12	12	12	12	12	12	12	12	12	12	12	12
Kisvárda	4	8	4	4	4	6	7	6	5	6	8	8	7	7	7	7	9	9	10	9	9	10	7	8	7	7	7	7	9	10	8	10	8
Mezőkövesd	4	2	2	2	2	2	3	2	3	2	2	3	2	3	3	3	3	3	3	3	3	3	3	3	3	3	3	3	3	3	3	4	4
Puskás Akadémia	2	5	8	5	5	3	4	4	4	4	4	4	4	4	4	4	4	4	4	4	4	4	4	4	4	5	5	4	4	4	4	3	3
Paks	9	4	5	6	6	8	9	7	9	9	10	10	10	10	10	10	10	10	9	10	10	9	10	10	10	11	10	10	10	9	10	9	10
Újpest	12	7	6	7	9	7	5	5	7	8	7	6	6	6	5	5	6	7	7	8	8	7	8	9	9	10	9	8	7	8	9	8	6
Zalaegerszeg	9	10	10	8	8	10	8	9	10	11	11	11	11	11	11	11	11	11	11	11	11	11	11	11	11	8	8	9	8	7	5	6	7

Leader and UEFA Champions League first qualifying round
UEFA Europa League first qualifying round
Relegation to 2020–21 NB II

Source: https://adatbank.mlsz.hu/league/52/0/20850/33.html

== Results ==
=== Rounds 1–22 ===
Home \ Away	HON	DEB	DIO	FEH	FER	KAP	KIS	MEZ	PAK	PUS	UJP	ZAL
Budapest Honvéd	—	2–3	1–0	0–1	0–0	2–0	1–3	1–2	2–1	1–1	0–0	2–0
Debrecen	1–1	—	2–1	1–1	1–6	0–1	4–1	1–3	3–1	1–2	4–0	3–2
Diósgyőr	2–1	1–2	—	1–3	0–1	2–0	3–1	0–3	2–0	1–1	1–2	1–0
Fehérvár	0–0	2–1	5–1	—	1–2	4–2	3–0	2–1	0–2	1–3	0–2	4–1
Ferencváros	0–0	2–1	1–0	1–0	—	1–0	1–0	1–1	4–0	2–2	1–0	3–2
Kaposvár	0–1	4–1	2–0	0–2	2–3	—	0–2	1–2	0–3	1–1	2–3	0–4
Kisvárda	2–0	1–0	2–2	0–2	1–2	5–3	—	1–2	1–0	0–1	2–0	3–3
Mezőkövesd	1–2	3–1	0–1	0–0	3–0	2–0	1–0	—	0–2	1–0	2–2	1–0
Paks	3–1	4–2	1–2	0–2	0–4	2–1	1–1	1–0	—	0–2	2–4	2–0
Puskás Akadémia	1–2	0–0	2–2	0–2	4–1	2–0	3–1	1–1	4–2	—	1–3	0–1
Újpest	2–3	3–2	0–2	0–1	0–1	27 Jun	1–0	1–2	1–1	1–3	—	0–0
Zalaegerszeg	0–1	0–2	1–3	3–3	1–2	2–0	1–1	1–1	3–1	1–1	2–1	—

Source: Hungarian Football Federation (in Hungarian), Soccerway
Legend: Blue = home team win; Yellow = draw; Red = away team win.

=== Rounds 23–33 ===
Home \ Away	HON	DEB	DIO	FEH	FER	KAP	KIS	MEZ	PAK	PUS	UJP	ZAL
Budapest Honvéd	—	3–1	0–4	1–1	0–2	4–2	1–5	—	—	—	—	—
Debrecen	—	—	4–0	—	—	1–1	1–0	—	1–1	2–2	—	0–3
Diósgyőr	—	—	—	—	—	—	0–2	1–0	—	1–2	2–1	1–1
Fehérvár	—	1–0	1–1	—	1–0	3–0	2–0	—	—	—	2–2	—
Ferencváros	—	2–0	3–0	—	—	5–0	1–0	1–0	—	—	1–0	—
Kaposvár	—	—	3–0	—	—	—	1–2	0–4	—	—	0–1	0–6
Kisvárda	—	—	—	—	—	—	—	1–1	2–0	1–1	1–0	0–1
Mezőkövesd	1–2	0–1	—	2–1	—	—	—	—	0–2	0–0	—	1–2
Paks	0–0	—	4–2	0–0	2–2	3–0	—	—	—	—	—	—
Puskás Akadémia	2–1	—	—	1–4	1–1	2–1	—	—	3–1	—	—	—
Újpest	1–0	3–1	—	—	—	5–0	—	1–1	1–1	2–3	—	2–1
Zalaegerszeg	2–0	—	—	1–1	1–1	—	—	—	3–3	2–0	—	—

Source: Hungarian Football Federation (in Hungarian), Soccerway
Legend: Blue = home team win; Yellow = draw; Red = away team win.

== Statistics ==
=== Top goalscorers ===
Rank	Player	Club	Goals
1	(Hungary) András Radó	Zalaegerszeg	13
2	(Hungary) Norbert Könyves	Paks	11
2	(Italy) Davide Lanzafame	Honvéd	11
2	(Czech Republic) David Vaněček	Puskás Akadémia	11
5	(Hungary) Gergely Bobál	Zalaegerszeg	10
5	(Ivory Coast) Franck Boli	Ferencváros	10
5	(Bosnia and Herzegovina) Armin Hodžić	Fehérvár	10
8	(Nigeria) Tunde Adeniji	Debrecen	9
8	(Hungary) Márkó Futács	Fehérvár	9
8	(Hungary) Márk Szécsi	Debrecen	9
8	(Ukraine) Oleksandr Zubkov	Ferencváros	9

== Average attendances ==
Pos	Team	Total	High	Low	Average	Change
1	Ferencváros	107,894	18,759	2,725	8,991	−16.1%
2	Diósgyőr	61,697	8,376	2,255	4,746	+11.6%
3	Zalaegerszeg	49,207	10,566	602	3,785	+105.9%^{1}
4	Fehérvár	48,091	12,192	1,325	3,699	+16.4%
5	Debrecen	46,496	8,136	1,720	3,577	+0.8%
6	Honvéd	31,988	3,616	700	2,461	+28.6%
7	Kisvárda	30,594	3,308	820	2,353	+4.0%
8	Mezőkövesd	28,292	4,140	784	2,176	−9.1%
9	Újpest	23,372	3,752	182	2,125	−24.9%
10	Kaposvár	22,209	4,115	500	1,586	+70.7%^{1}
11	Puskás Akadémia	18,854	3,846	600	1,450	+8.2%
12	Paks	18,755	2,680	700	1,443	+46.2%
	League total	487,449	18,759	182	3,165	−4.2%

Updated to games played on 7 June 2020
Source: League matches: Nemzeti Bajnokság I 2019/2020
Notes:
Round 15 was played under closed doors. From round 16 to the end of the league, matches were played with limited attendance.
1: Played last season in Nemzeti Bajnokság II

== See also ==
- 2019–20 Magyar Kupa
- 2019–20 Nemzeti Bajnokság II
- 2019–20 Nemzeti Bajnokság III
- 2019–20 Megyei Bajnokság I
