= 2022 Magyar Kupa final =

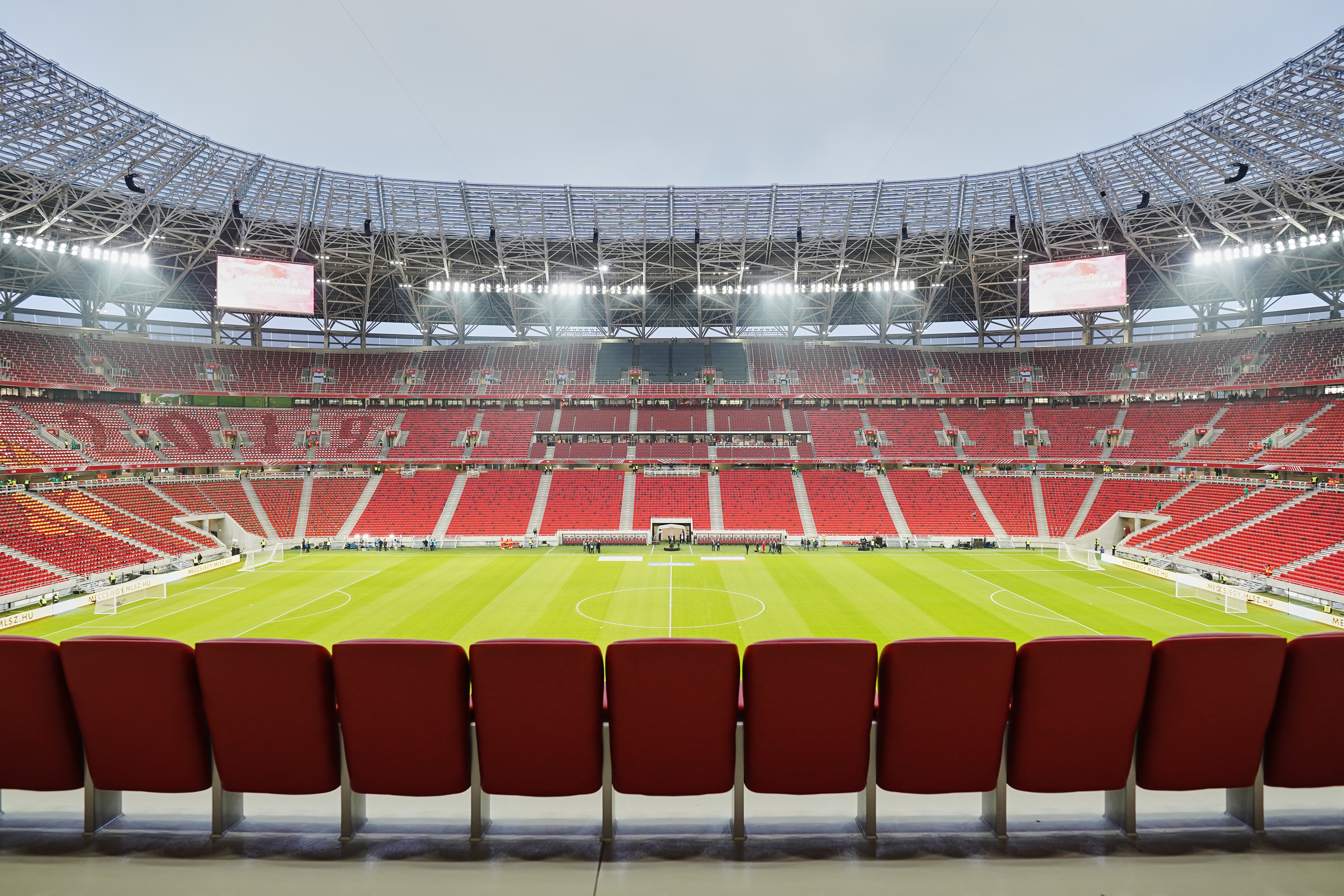
- The Puskás Aréna in Budapest hosted the final.
- Event: 2021–22 Magyar Kupa
Ferencváros	Paks
3	0
- Date: 11 May 2022
- Venue: Puskás Aréna, Budapest
- Referee: Tamás Bognár
- Attendance: 38,979

The 2022 Magyar Kupa final decided the winners of the 2021–22 Magyar Kupa, the 82nd season of Hungarian premier football cup, the Magyar Kupa. It was played on 11 May 2022 between Ferencváros and Paks.

Ferencváros won the match 3–0 for their twenty-fourth Magyar Kupa title.

== Teams ==
Team	Previous finals appearances (bold indicates winners)
Ferencváros	32 (1912, **1913**, **1922**, **1927**, **1928**, 1931, 1932, **1933**, **1935**, **1942**, **1943**, **1944**, **1958**, 1966, **1972**, **1974**, **1976**, 1977, **1978**, 1979, 1986, 1989, **1991**, **1993**, **1994**, **1995**, **2003**, **2004**, 2005, **2015**, **2016**, **2017**)
Paks	None

== Route to the final ==
Note: In all results below, the score of the finalist is given first (H: home; A: away).

Ferencváros		Round	Paks	
Opponent	Result		Opponent	Result
Hatvan (MB I)	9–0 (A)	Round of 64	Gyömrő (MB I)	9–1 (A)
Tököl (MB I)	7–0 (A)	Round of 32	III. Kerület (NB II)	5–0 (A)
Vasas (NB II)	2–0 (A)	Round of 16	Csákvár (NB II)	2–0 (A)
Honvéd (NB I)	1–0 (A)	Quarter-finals	Kazincbarcika (NB II)	1–0 (A)
Győr (NB II)	4–1 (A)	Semi-finals	Újpest (NB I)	3–0 (H)

== Match ==
=== Details ===
11 May 2022
19:30 CEST

Ferencváros	3–0	Paks
Zachariassen 16'; Boli 83', 86'	Report

Puskás Aréna, Budapest
Attendance: 38,979
Referee: Tamás Bognár

**Ferencváros**	**Paks**

GK	90	(Hungary) Dénes Dibusz (c)
DF	21	(Hungary) Endre Botka	(yellow card) 75'	(substituted off) 82'
DF	25	(Slovenia) Miha Blažič
DF	3	(Morocco) Samy Mmaee
DF	23	(Hungary) Lóránd Pászka		(substituted off) 76'
MF	13	(Nigeria) Anderson Esiti
MF	93	(Tunisia) Aïssa Laïdouni
MF	59	(Brazil) Marquinhos		(substituted off) 59'
FW	16	(Norway) Kristoffer Zachariassen
FW	28	(Argentina) Carlos Auzqui		(substituted off) 76'
FW	70	(Ivory Coast) Franck Boli
Substitutes:
GK	1	(Hungary) Ádám Bogdán
DF	31	(Hungary) Bálint Vécsei		(substituted on) 82'
DF	2	(Bosnia and Herzegovina) Muhamed Bešić
DF	33	(Georgia (country)) Lasha Dvali
DF	17	(Bosnia and Herzegovina) Eldar Ćivić		(substituted on) 76'
MF	31	(United States) Henry Wingo		(substituted on) 76'
MF	18	(Hungary) Dávid Sigér
ΜF	22	(Germany) Marko Marin
MF	44	(Bosnia and Herzegovina) Stjepan Lončar	(yellow card) 68'	(substituted on) 59'
FW	11	(Ukraine) Oleksandr Zubkov
FW	14	(Nigeria) Fortune Bassey
FW	80	(Serbia) Željko Gavrić
Manager:
(Russia) Stanislav Cherchesov

GK	1	(Hungary) Gergely Nagy
DF	20	(Hungary) Nikolasz Kovács		(substituted off) 80'
DF	6	(Hungary) Norbert Szélpál
DF	24	(Hungary) Bence Lenzsér	(yellow card) 65'
DF	30	(Hungary) János Szabó (c)		(substituted off) 84'
MF	27	(Hungary) Bálint Szabó		(substituted off) 66'
MF	22	(Hungary) József Windecker	(yellow card) 60'
MF	8	(Hungary) Balázs Balogh		(substituted off) 46'
MF	23	(Slovakia) Sinan Medgyes
FW	10	(Hungary) Zsolt Haraszti		(substituted off) 66'
FW	16	(Hungary) Martin Ádám	(yellow card) 90+2'
Substitutes:
GK	31	(Hungary) Gergő Rácz
DF	2	(Hungary) Ákos Kinyik
DF	3	(Hungary) Zsolt Gévay
DF	5	(Hungary) Olivér Tamás		(substituted on) 66'
DF	11	(Hungary) Attila Osváth		(substituted on) 84'
MF	12	(Hungary) Gábor Vas
MF	17	(Hungary) Bence Kocsis
MF	18	(Hungary) Gergő Gyurkits
MF	19	(Hungary) Barna Kesztyűs
MF	28	(Hungary) Richárd Nagy
FW	7	(Hungary) Máté Sajbán		(substituted on) 46'
FW	13	(Hungary) Dániel Böde		(substituted on) 66'
Manager:
(Hungary) György Bognár

Man of the Match:
Franck Boli (Ferencváros)

Assistant referees:
Balázs Búzás
Péter Kóbor
Fourth official:
Balázs Berke
Video assistant referee:
Zoltán Iványi
Assistant video assistant referee:
Vencel Tóth II.

**Match rules**

- 90 minutes
- 30 minutes of extra time if necessary
- Penalty shoot-out if scores still level
- Nine named substitutes, of which up to five may be used at maximum three times, with a sixth allowed in extra time.
