= 2025 Magyar Kupa final =

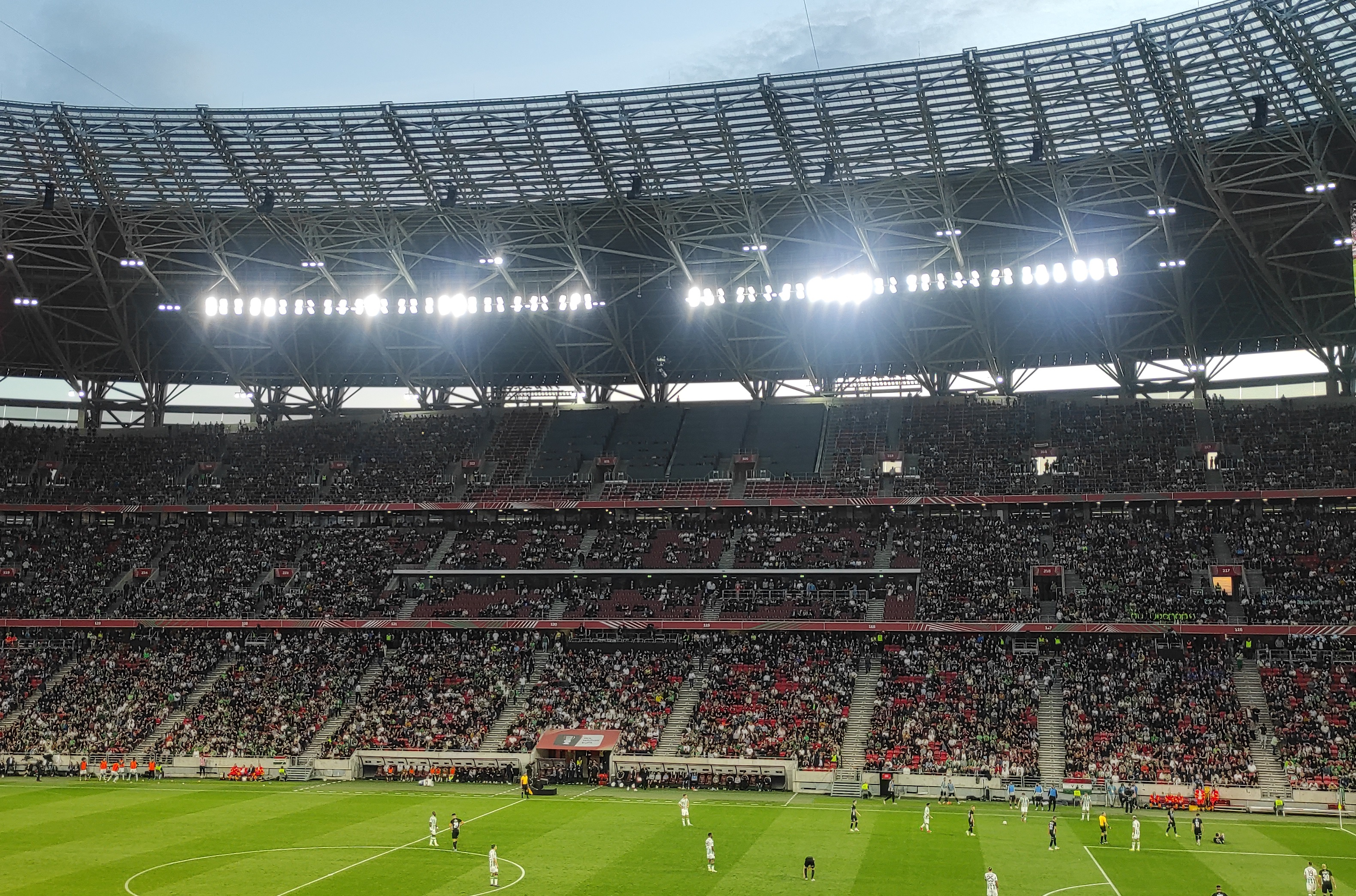
- The Puskás Aréna during the final.
- Event: 2024–25 Magyar Kupa
Ferencváros	Paks
1	1
- After extra time Paks won 3–4 on penalties
- Date: 14 May 2025
- Venue: Puskás Aréna, Budapest
- Referee: Csaba Pintér
- Attendance: 54,762
- Weather: 16°C, clear

The 2025 Magyar Kupa final decided the winners of the 2024–25 Magyar Kupa, the 85th season of Hungarian premier football cup, the Magyar Kupa. The match was played on 14 May 2025 at the Puskás Aréna in Budapest between Paks and Ferencváros.

The final score of the match remained 1–1 after extra time, and Paks won the penalty shootout 4–3, thus winning the cup for the second time in its history.

== Teams ==
Team	Previous finals appearances (bold indicates winners)
Ferencváros	34 (1912, **1913**, **1922**, **1927**, **1928**, 1931, 1932, **1933**, **1935**, **1942**, **1943**, **1944**, **1958**, 1966, **1972**, **1974**, **1976**, 1977, **1978**, 1979, 1986, 1989, **1991**, **1993**, **1994**, **1995**, **2003**, **2004**, 2005, **2015**, **2016**, **2017**, **2022**, 2024)
Paks	2 (2022, **2024**)

== Venue ==
The final has been originally played at the rebuilt Puskás Aréna since it opened, in 2020. This final was the sixth Magyar Kupa final in this stadium.

== Background ==
Ferencváros and Paks met for the third time in four years in the final of the Hungarian Cup. The most common pairing so far has been the Ferencváros-Újpest match in the final, which has happened four times, in 1923, 1927, 1933 and 2016. Ferencváros is the most successful club, having won the Hungarian Cup 24 times and being a finalist 10 more times. It has won the Magyar Kupa four times in the previous ten years, in 2015, 2016, 2017 and 2022. Paks is a finalist for the third time after 2022 and 2024. Last year, the Paks became the 20th winner in the history of the Hungarian Cup.

== Route to the final ==
Note: In all results below, the score of the finalist is given first (H: home; A: away).

Ferencváros			Round	Paks		
Opponent	Result			Opponent	Result	
Bye			First round	Bye		
Bye			Second round	Bye		
Budafok (NB II)	3–0	(A)	Round of 64	Mezőörs (MB I (Tier 4))	3–0	(A)
Tiszafüred (NB III)	2–1	(A)	Round of 32	Honvéd (NB II)	5–1	(A)
Győr (NB I)	4–3 (a.e.t.)	(A)	Round of 16	Mezőkövesd (NB II)	3–0	(A)
Újpest (NB I)	3–1	(H)	Quarter-finals	Kisvárda (NB II)	1–0	(A)
MTK (NB I)	3–1	(H)	Semi-finals	Zalaegerszeg (NB I)	2–1	(H)

== Match ==
=== Details ===
14 May 2025
19:00 CEST (UTC+2)

Ferencváros	1–1 (a.e.t.)	Paks
Joseph 90+4'	Report	B. Tóth 45+1'
Penalties
Pešić (penalty missed); Zachariassen (penalty scored); Joseph (penalty missed); Gustavo (penalty scored); Cissé (penalty scored)	3–4	Windecker (penalty scored); Ádám (penalty scored); Balogh (penalty missed); Gyurkits (penalty scored); Vécsei (penalty scored)

Puskás Aréna, Budapest
Attendance: 54,762
Referee: Csaba Pintér

**Ferencváros**	**Paks**

GK	90	(Hungary) Dénes Dibusz (c)
RWB	3	(Denmark) Stefan Gartenmann		(substituted off) 83'
CB	27	(France) Ibrahim Cissé
LWB	22	(Hungary) Gábor Szalai	(yellow card) 118'
RM	25	(Latvia) Cebrail Makreckis
CM	80	(Ivory Coast) Habib Maïga		(substituted off) 99'
CM	64	(Hungary) Alex Tóth	(yellow card) 107'
CM	15	(Israel) Mohammad Abu Fani	(yellow card) 90+5'	(substituted off) 64'
RM	17	(Bosnia and Herzegovina) Eldar Ćivić		(substituted off) 64'
LF	11	(Brazil) Matheus Saldanha		(substituted off) 77'
RF	11	(Hungary) Barnabás Varga		(substituted off) 64'
Substitutes:
GK	89	(Hungary) Dávid Gróf
DF	5	(Guinea) Naby Keïta
DF	8	(Serbia) Aleksandar Pešić		(substituted on) 64'
MF	16	(Norway) Kristoffer Zachariassen		(substituted on) 77'
FW	20	(Mali) Adama Traoré		(substituted on) 64'
FW	24	(Nigeria) Tosin Kehinde
FW	32	(Serbia) Aleksandar Ćirković		(substituted on) 83'
DF	34	(Brazil) Raul Gustavo		(substituted on) 99'
MF	37	(Brazil) Guilherme Henrique
DF	54	(Hungary) Norbert Kaján
FW	75	(France) Lenny Joseph		(substituted on) 64'
DF	99	(Ecuador) Cristian Ramírez
Manager:
(Republic of Ireland) Robbie Keane

GK	1	(Hungary) Péter Szappanos	(yellow card) 94'
RWB	23	(Hungary) Bence Ötvös	(yellow card) 55'	(substituted off) 79'
CB	12	(Hungary) Gábor Vas
CB	30	(Hungary) János Szabó (c)	(yellow card) 34'	(substituted off) 106'
LWB	28	(Hungary) Kristóf Hinora		(substituted off) 91'
RM	11	(Hungary) Attila Osváth
CM	22	(Hungary) József Windecker
CM	26	(Hungary) Szabolcs Mezei		(substituted off) 90'
RM	21	(Hungary) Kristóf Papp
LF	29	(Hungary) Barna Tóth		(substituted off) 75'
RF	10	(Hungary) Zsolt Haraszti		(substituted off) 75'
Substitutes:
GK	1	(Hungary) Ádám Kovácsik
DF	2	(Hungary) Ákos Kinyik	(yellow card) 105+1'	(substituted on) 79'
MF	5	(Hungary) Bálint Vécsei		(substituted on) 75'
DF	6	(Hungary) Milán Győrfi
FW	7	(Hungary) Martin Ádám	(yellow card) 97'	(substituted on) 91'
MF	8	(Hungary) Balázs Balogh		(substituted on) 90'
FW	13	(Hungary) Dániel Böde	(yellow card) 88'	(substituted on) 75'
DF	14	(Hungary) Erik Silye
FW	15	(Hungary) Norbert Könyves
FW	17	(Hungary) Roland Varga
MF	18	(Hungary) Gergő Gyurkits		(substituted on) 106'
MF	19	(Hungary) Kevin Horváth
Manager:
(Hungary) György Bognár

Man of the Match:
Péter Szappanos (Paks)

Assistant referees:
Péter Kóbor
Balázs Szert
Fourth official:
Mihály Káprály
Video assistant referee:
József Erdős
Assistant video assistant referee:
Sándor Andó-Szabó

**Match rules**

- 90 minutes
- 30 minutes of extra time if necessary
- Penalty shoot-out if scores still level
- Twelve named substitutes
- Maximum of five substitutions, with a sixth allowed in extra time

== See also ==
- 2024–25 Nemzeti Bajnokság I
