= 2025–26 Paksi FC season =

Paks
2025–26 season
- CEO: Zsolt Haraszti
- Manager: György Bognár
- Stadium: Fehérvári úti Stadion
- Nemzeti Bajnokság I: (bronze) 3rd place
- Magyar Kupa: Round of 16
- UEFA Europa League: First qualifying round
- UEFA Conference League: Third qualifying round
- Top goalscorer: League: Böde (10); All: Böde (14)
- Highest home attendance: 4,691 (v Ferencváros, Nemzeti Bajnokság, R20, 1 February 2026)
- Lowest home attendance: 1,312 (v Diósgyőr, Magyar Kupa, Round of 16, 11 February 2026)
- Average home league attendance: 2,673
- Biggest win: 4 goals, (5–1) v Kisvárda (A), Nemzeti Bajnokság, R2, 3 August 2025, (5–1) v Szajol (A), Magyar Kupa, Round of 64, 13 September 2025, (5–1) v Kazincbarcika (H), Nemzeti Bajnokság, R28, 4 April 2026
- Biggest defeat: 4 goals, (v Diósgyőr (H), Magyar Kupa, Round of 16, 11 February 2026)
- All statistics correct as of 16 May 2026 (completed).

The 2025–26 season is Paksi Futball Club's 73rd competitive season and the club's 12th consecutive season in the Nemzeti Bajnokság I. In addition to the domestic league, the team participates in the Magyar Kupa and the UEFA Europa League after winning the previous Magyar Kupa (domestic cup).

Magyar Kupa

In the domestic cup (Magyar Kupa) Paks joined the competition in the Round of 64 and advanced to the top 32 by defeating against fourth-division (Megyei Bajnokság I) Szajol 5–1 away. In the Round of 32 advanced to the top 16 after winning against third-division (Nemzeti Bajnokság III) Martfű 4–1 away. In the Round of 16 they lost against first division (Nemzeti Bajnokság I) Diósgyőr 2–6 at home.

== Kits ==
Supplier: Nike / Sponsor: Tippmix

Home	Away	Away alt.

Goalkeeper 1	Goalkeeper 2	Goalkeeper 3

== First team squad ==
As of 5 January 2026

Note: Flags indicate national team as defined under FIFA eligibility rules; some limited exceptions apply. Players may hold more than one non-FIFA nationality.

No.	Pos.	Nation	Player
1	GK	HUN	Ádám Kovácsik
2	DF	HUN	Ákos Kinyik
3	DF	HUN	Áron Alaxai
4	MF	HUN	Gergő Májik
5	MF	HUN	Bálint Vécsei
7	FW	HUN	Martin Ádám
8	MF	HUN	Balázs Balogh
9	FW	HUN	János Hahn
11	DF	HUN	Zsombor Bévárdi
12	DF	HUN	Gábor Vas
13	FW	HUN	Dániel Böde (vice-captain)
14	DF	HUN	Erik Silye
15	FW	HUN	Ákos Szendrei
16	MF	HUN	Zoltán Pesti
17	DF	HUN	Kristóf Hinora

No.	Pos.	Nation	Player
18	MF	HUN	Gergő Gyurkits
19	MF	HUN	Kevin Horváth
20	DF	HUN	Márió Zeke
21	MF	HUN	Kristóf Papp
22	MF	HUN	József Windecker (vice-captain)
23	MF	HUN	Csaba Máté
24	DF	HUN	Bence Lenzsér
25	GK	HUN	Barnabás Simon
26	DF	HUN	Milán Szekszárdi
27	FW	HUN	János Galambos
28	GK	HUN	Márk Gyetván
29	FW	HUN	Barna Tóth
30	DF	HUN	János Szabó (captain)
31	GK	HUN	Márk Gyetván

== Transfers ==
=== Summer ===
In
Date	No.	Pos.	Nat.	Player	Moving from	Fee	Ref.
26 June 2025	20	DF	Hungary	Márió Zeke	Kecskemét (NB II)	Undisclosed	
26 June 2025	23	MF	Hungary	Milán Pető	Videoton (NB II)	Undisclosed	
27 June 2025	TBD	FW	Hungary	József Szalai	Mezőkövesd (NB II)	Undisclosed	
8 July 2025	TBD	FW	Hungary	Bálint Rideg	Vasas (NB II)	Undisclosed	

Return from loan
Date	No.	Pos.	Nat.	Player	Moving from	Division	Ref.
16 June 2025	25	GK	Hungary	Barnabás Simon	Diósgyőr	Nemzeti Bajnokság I	
16 June 2025	TBD	DF	Hungary	Milán Szekszárdi	Szentlőrinc	Nemzeti Bajnokság II	
16 June 2025	TBD	FW	Hungary	Ákos Szendrei	Zalaegerszeg	Nemzeti Bajnokság I	
16 June 2025	16	FW	Hungary	Zoltán Pesti	Kozármisleny	Nemzeti Bajnokság II	
16 June 2025	TBD	MF	Hungary	Andor Lapu	Tatabánya	Nemzeti Bajnokság II	
16 June 2025	27	MF	Hungary	Bálint Szabó	Videoton	Nemzeti Bajnokság II	
16 June 2025	20	DF	Hungary	Krisztián Kovács	Nyíregyháza	Nemzeti Bajnokság II	

Out
Date	No.	Pos.	Nat.	Player	Moving to	Fee	Ref.
2 June 2025	23	MF	Hungary	Bence Ötvös	Ferencváros	Undisclosed	
25 June 2025	27	MF	Hungary	Bálint Szabó	Csíkszereda	Undisclosed	
26 June 2025	20	DF	Hungary	Krisztián Kovács	Videoton (NB II)	Undisclosed	
26 June 2025	17	MF	Hungary	Bence Kocsis	Videoton (NB II)	Undisclosed	
27 June 2025	26	MF	Hungary	Szabolcs Mezei	TSC	Undisclosed	
8 July 2025	17	FW	Hungary	Roland Varga	Videoton (NB II)	Undisclosed	
14 July 2025	15	FW	Hungary	Norbert Könyves	Kazincbarcika	Undisclosed	

Out on loan
Date	No.	Pos.	Nat.	Player	Moving to	Loan date	Ref.
26 June 2025	6	DF	Hungary	Milán Győrfi	Kecskemét (NB II)	30 June 2026	
27 June 2025		FW	Hungary	József Szalai	Mezőkövesd (NB II)	30 June 2026	
28 June 2025	7	FW	Hungary	Alen Skribek	Zalaegerszeg	30 June 2026	
2 July 2025	15	DF	Hungary	Zalán Debreceni	Ajka (NB II)	30 June 2026	

=== Winter ===
Return from loan
Date	No.	Pos.	Nat.	Player	Moving from	Division	Ref.
5 January 2026	16	MF	Hungary	Zoltán Pesti	Kozármisleny	Nemzeti Bajnokság II	
5 January 2026	23	MF	Hungary	Csaba Máté	Kozármisleny	Nemzeti Bajnokság II	

Out on loan
Date	No.	Pos.	Nat.	Player	Moving to	Loan date	Ref.
19 January 2026	10	FW	Hungary	Zsolt Haraszti	Videoton (NB II)	30 June 2026	

=== Contract renewals ===
Date	No.	Pos.	Nat.	Player	Extension to	Ref.
28 June 2025	7	FW	Hungary	Alen Skribek	30 June 2027	
7 July 2025	8	MF	Hungary	Balázs Balogh	30 June 2026	
27 October 2025	22	MF	Hungary	József Windecker	30 June 2028	
13 November 2025	24	DF	Hungary	Bence Lenzsér	30 June 2029	
19 February 2026	14	DF	Hungary	Erik Silye	30 June 2029	
19 February 2026	23	MF	Hungary	Csaba Máté	30 June 2030	

== Friendlies ==
After the end of the 2024–25 season, work will resume on 16th June 2025 after a three-week break.

=== Pre-season ===
19 June 2025 Friendly	Paks	6–0	Budaörs (NB III)	Paks
11:00 CEST (UTC+02:00)	Rideg 2'; Szendrei 56', 61', 90'; Galambos 64', 83'	Report		Stadium: Paksi FC Stadion, Training Center
Note: Paks 1st half: Simon — Szekszárdi, Kinyik, P. Szécsi, Győrfi, D. Horváth, Silye, Mezei, K. Horváth, Rideg, Pesti • Paks 2nd half: Gyetván — Papp, Vas, Lenzsér, K. Kovács, Balogh, Lapu, B. Szabó, Gyurkits, Galambos, Szendrei • Manager: György Bognár

21 June 2025 Friendly	Kalocsa (MB I)	1–15	Paks	Kalocsa
11:00 CEST (UTC+02:00)	Farkas 46'	Report	J. Szabó 10'; Böde 18', 22', 24', 30'; Ádám 27'; Hahn 34'; B. Szabó 36'; Lapu 41'; Pesti 43', 49', 51'; D. Horváth 72'; Skribek 75'; Galambos 85'	Stadium: Molnár Ferenc Sport és Szabadidő Központ
Note: 3×30 min. Paks 1st period: Kovácsik — Papp, Kinyik, J. Szabó, Hinora, Windecker, Silye, Haraszti, Gyurkits, Böde, Ádám • Paks 2nd period: Simon — Lenzsér, Vas, Vécsei, K. Kovács, Mezei, Lapu, B. Szabó, Pesti, Tóth, Hahn • Paks 3rd period: Gyetván — D. Horváth, Szekszárdi, Balogh, Győrfi, K. Horváth, P. Szécsi, Skribek, Szendrei, Pesti, Galambos • Manager: György Bognár

26 June 2025 Friendly	Paks	6–1	Szeged (NB II)	Paks
11:00 CEST (UTC+02:00)	Haraszti; Lapu; Böde; Tóth; Galambos	Report	Kurdics (pen.)	Stadium: Paksi FC Stadion, Training center Referee: Péter Antal
Note: Paks 1st half: Kovácsik — Lenzsér, Vas, Vécsei, Szendrei, Papp, Silye, Gyurkits, Haraszti, Ádám, Hahn • Paks 2nd half: Simon — Szekszárdi, Kinyik, J. Szabó, Osváth, Balogh, Lapu, Hinora, Galambos, Böde, Tóth • Manager: György Bognár

Summer Training Camp in Telki Training Center, Hungary – from 27 June to 6 July, 2025.

29 June 2025 Friendly	Csíkszereda (Romanian I) (Romania)	2–0	Paks	Szombathely
17:00 CEST (UTC+02:00)	Babati 72' (pen.), 82'	Report		Stadium: Király Sportlétesítmény
Note: 2×60 min. Paks 1st half: Kovácsik — Hinora, Lenzsér, Vas, Vécsei, Silye (Zeke (substituted on) 45') — Papp, Haraszti, Windecker — Tóth, Hahn • Paks 2nd half: Simon (Gyetván (substituted on) 90') — Zeke, J. Szabó, Kinyik, Szekszárdi, Szendrei — Balogh, Gyurkits, Galambos — Böde, Ádám • Manager: György Bognár

3 July 2025 Friendly	Sabah (Azerbaijan I)	3–3	Paks	Szombathely
17:00 CEST (UTC+02:00)	Khalbulnyer 44'; Kupusovic 72', 82'	Report	Lenzsér 6', 54'; Haraszti 49'
Note: Paks: Kovácsik — Hinora, Lenzsér (Kinyik (substituted on) 60'), Vas, J. Szabó, Zeke, Balogh, Vécsei (Haraszti (substituted on) 46'), Gyurkits (Szendrei (substituted on) 46'), Papp, Tóth (Böde (substituted on) 60') • Manager: György Bognár

5 July 2025 Friendly	Varaždin (Croatian I) (Croatia)	4–0	Paks	Telki
18:00 CEST (UTC+02:00)	Latković 44'; Tajio 47'; Mamić 85'; Quissequel 101'	Report
Note: 2×60 min. Paks: Simon — Lapu, Szekszárdi, Kinyik, Vécsei (Lenzsér (substituted on) 45' (substituted off) 90' (Vas (substituted on) 90')), Silye (Hinora (substituted on) 90') — Horváth, Windecker (Balogh (substituted on) 90'), Haraszti (Gyurkits (substituted on) 61') — Szendrei (Galambos (substituted on) 61'), Hahn • Manager: György Bognár

12 July 2025 Friendly	Paks	4–0	Iváncsa (NB III)	Paks
11:00 CEST (UTC+02:00)	Szekszárdi 4'; Galambos 17'; Hahn 31'; Gyurkits 87'	Report		Stadium: Paksi FC Stadion, Training Center
Note: Paks 1st half: Simon — Szabó, Szekszárdi, Köllő — Silye, Horváth, Gyurkits, Lapu — Galambos — Hahn, Szendrei • Paks 2nd half: Gyetván — Éger, Szekszárdi, Köllő — Silye (Pető (substituted on) 60'), Horváth, Gyurkits, Lapu — Galambos (Májik (substituted on) 60') — Marosi, Szendrei (Tóth (substituted on) 60') • Manager: György Bognár

19 July 2025 Friendly	Paks	5–3	Budapest Honvéd (NB II)	Paks
11:00 CEST (UTC+02:00)	Galambos 40'; K. Horváth 50'; Gyurkits 57'; Szendrei 75'; Holka 81'	Report	E. Kovács 75'; Kántor 85'; Á. Sigér 88'	Stadium: Paksi FC Stadion, Training center
Note: Paks: Simon (Gyetván (substituted on) 46') — Köllő, Szekszárdi, Éger — Silye (Holka (substituted on) 59'), K. Horváth, Balogh (Tóth (substituted on) 46'), Haraszti (Májik (substituted on) 46'), Gyurkits (Ádám (substituted on) 70') — Galambos (Marosi (substituted on) 70'), Szendrei • Manager: György Bognár

=== Mid-season ===
10 October 2025 Friendly	Paks	3–2	Videoton (NB II)	Paks
11:00 CEST (UTC+02:00)	Vécsei 20'; Haraszti 50', 84'	Report	T. Tóth 22'; Menyhárt 81'	Stadium: Paksi FC Stadion; Referee: Gergely Bana
Note: Paks: Simon (Kovácsik (substituted on) 46') — Lenzsér (Papp (substituted on) 46'), Szekszárdi (Kinyik (substituted on) 46'), Éger (Silye (substituted on) 46'), Gyurkits, Balogh (Hinora (substituted on) 46'), Zeke, Windecker (Galambos (substituted on) 46'), Vécsei, Pesti, Haraszti • Manager: György Bognár

Winter Training Camp in Belek Training Center, Turkey from 6 January until 17 January 2026.

9 January 2026 Friendly	Sumgayit (Azerbaijan I)	1–5	Paks	Belek, Turkey
13:00 CET (UTC+01:00)	Ahmadzada 45'	Report	B. Tóth 28'; Á. Szendrei 41'; Ádám 47', 70'; Böde 78'
Note: 2x45 minutes playing time • Paks 1st half: Kovácsik — Hinora, Kinyik, Lenzsér, Vécsei, Zeke — Ke. Horváth, Haraszti, Windecker — B. Tóth, Á. Szendrei • Paks 2nd half: Simon — Osváth, Szekszárdi, Papp, J. Szabó, Silye — Balogh, Gyurkits, Máté — Ádám, Böde • Manager: György Bognár

11 January 2026 Friendly	Ludogorets (Bulgaria I)	3–2	Paks	Belek, Turkey
15:00 CET (UTC+01:00)	Marcus 19', 22'; Machado 57'	Report	Windecker 26' (pen.); B. Tóth 62'
Note: 2x45 minutes playing time • Paks: Kovácsik (Simon (substituted on) 62') — Osváth (Hinora (substituted on) 62'), Lenzsér (Szekszárdi (substituted on) 46'), Vécsei (Kinyik (substituted on) 62'), J. Szabó (O. Tamás (substituted on) 62'), Zeke (Silye (substituted on) 62') — Papp (Balogh (substituted on) 62'), Haraszti (Ke. Horváth (substituted on) 62'), Windecker (Gyurkits (substituted on) 62') — B. Tóth (Ádám (substituted on) 62'), Pesti (Böde (substituted on) 46') • Manager: György Bognár

13 January 2026 Friendly	ŁKS Łódź (Polish II) (Poland)	0–0	Paks	Belek, Turkey
13:00		Report
Note: 2x45 minutes playing time • Paks: Simon (Gyetván (substituted on) 46') — Hinora (Osváth (substituted on) 60'), Éger, Kinyik (O. Tamás (substituted on) 29'), Szekszárdi, Silye (Zeke (substituted on) 60') — Balogh (Májik (substituted on) 46'), Gyurkits (Ke. Horváth (substituted on) 60'), Máté — Galambos, Á. Szendrei (Pesti (substituted on) 46') • Manager: György Bognár

16 January 2026 Friendly	Widzew Łódź (Polish I) (Poland)	2–1	Paks	Belek, Turkey
TBD	Bukari 61'; Bergier 72'	Report	B. Tóth 3'
Note: 45+30+45 minutes playing time • Paks until 75th minutes: Kovácsik — Osváth, Lenzsér, Vécsei, J. Szabó, Zeke (Silye (substituted on) 46') — Ke. Horváth, Papp, Windecker (Balogh (substituted on) 46') — Á. Szendrei, B. Tóth • Paks from 76th minutes: Simon — Hinora, Lenzsér (O. Tamás (substituted on) 90+1'), Szekszárdi, Vécsei (Éger (substituted on) 90+1'), Silye — Gyurkits, Balogh (Máté (substituted on) 90+1'), Haraszti — Böde, Ádám • Manager: György Bognár

== Competitions ==
=== Overall record ===
In italics, we indicate the Last match and the Final position achieved in competition(s) that have not yet been completed.

Competition	First match	Last match	Starting round	Final position	Record							
Competition	First match	Last match	Starting round	Final position	Pld	W	D	L	GF	GA	GD	Win %
Nemzeti Bajnokság I	27 July 2025	16 May 2026	Matchday 1	3rd	33	15	8	10	63	46	+17	45.45
Magyar Kupa	13 September 2025	11 February 2026	Round of 64	Round of 16	3	2	0	1	11	8	+3	66.67
UEFA Europa League	10 July 2025	17 July 2025	1st qualifying round	1st qualifying round	2	0	1	1	0	3	−3	0.00
UEFA Conference League	24 July 2025	14 August 2025	2nd qualifying round	3rd qualifying round	4	2	1	1	4	5	−1	50.00
Total					42	19	10	13	78	62	+16	45.24

Last updated: 16 May 2026
Source: Soccerway

=== Nemzeti Bajnokság I ===
==== League table ====
Pos	Team	Pld	W	D	L	GF	GA	GD	Pts	Qualification or relegation
1	Győr (C)	33	20	9	4	65	30	+35	69	Qualification for the Champions League first qualifying round
2	Ferencváros	33	21	5	7	67	31	+36	68	Qualification for the Europa League first qualifying round (Note: The 2025–26 Magyar Kupa winners (Ferencváros) qualify for the Europa League first qualifying round.)
3	Paks	33	15	8	10	63	46	+17	53	Qualification for the Conference League second qualifying round
4	Debrecen	33	14	11	8	51	41	+10	53	Qualification for the Conference League second qualifying round
5	Zalaegerszeg	33	13	9	11	49	43	+6	48	

Source: Hungarian Football Federation (in Hungarian)
Rules for classification: 1) Points; 2) Matches won; 3) Goal difference; 4) Goals scored; 5) Head-to-head points; 6) Head-to-head goal difference; 7) Fair play ranking; 8) Drawing of lots.
(C) Champions

==== Results summary ====
Overall								Home						Away					
Pld	W	D	L	GF	GA	GD	Pts	W	D	L	GF	GA	GD	W	D	L	GF	GA	GD
33	15	8	10	63	46	+17	53	8	4	4	39	27	+12	7	4	6	24	19	+5

Last updated: 16 May 2026.
Source: Soccerway

==== Matches ====
Win Draw Loss Fixtures Postponed

The draw for the 2025/26 season was held on 16 June 2025.

27 July 2025 1	Paks	3–3	Győri ETO	Paks
18:00 CEST	Simon (yellow card) 28'; Gyurkits 39' (yellow card) 66'; B. Tóth 63' (yellow card) 90+2'; Windecker 85' (pen.)	Report	Boldor 30'; Ouro 45+1' (pen.); Benbouali (yellow card) 54'; R. Tóth (yellow card) 56' (yellow-red card) 70'; Njie 67'; Vingler (yellow card) 77'	Stadium: Fehérvári úti Stadion; Attendance: 2,679; Referee: Péter Zierkelbach; Assistant referees: József Aradi, Bence Belicza
Note: • Paks: Simon — Á. Szendrei (Böde (substituted on) 71'), Vas, J. Szabó (c) — Ke. Horváth – Hinora (Vécsei (substituted on) 60'), Papp (Windecker (substituted on) 46'), M. Szekszárdi, Silye (Haraszti (substituted on) 76') — Hahn (B. Tóth (substituted on) 46'), Gyurkits • Manager: György Bognár • Player of the match: Barna Tóth, Paks 8.3 • Best player of Győr: Nfansu Njie 7.7

3 August 2025 2	Kisvárda	1–5	Paks	Kisvárda
17:45 CEST	Popoola (yellow card) 16'; Yordanov 24'; Matić (yellow card) 42'	Report	Á. Szendrei 5'; Kinyik (yellow card) 11'; Gyurkits 26'; Hahn 35', 39'; Vécsei (yellow card) 11'; Pető 85'	Stadium: Várkerti Stadion; Attendance: 2,084; Referee: Tamás Bognár; Assistant referees: Ákos Berényi, Péter Ország
Note: • Paks: Kovácsik — Kinyik, M. Szekszárdi, Hinora (Osváth (substituted on) 74'), Silye — Vécsei, Gyurkits (Debreceni (substituted on) 84'), Papp (c) (Windecker (substituted on) 46'), Ke. Horváth — Á. Szendrei (Pető (substituted on) 74'), Hahn (Ádám (substituted on) 55') • Manager: György Bognár • Player of the match: Kevin Horváth, Paks 9.1 • Best player of Kisvárda: Ridwan Popoola 7.3

10 August 2025 3	Újpest	1–2	Paks	Budapest
20:00 CEST	Kr. Horváth (yellow card) 7'; Matko 43'; Gonçalves (yellow card) 75'	Report	Ke. Horváth 38'; Papp (yellow card) 45'; Lenzsér (yellow card) 65' (goal) 76'; Pető (yellow card) 73'; M. Szekszárdi (yellow card) 90'	Stadium: Szusza Ferenc Stadion; Attendance: 8,650; Referee: Balázs Berke; Assistant referees: Vencel Tóth II, Balázs Szert
Note: • Paks: Kovácsik — Lenzsér, Kinyik, M. Szekszárdi — Osváth, Papp (c), Gyurkits (Windecker (substituted on) 78'), Ke. Horváth (Hinora (substituted on) 87'), Silye — Hahn (B. Tóth (substituted on) 62'), Á. Szendrei (Pető (substituted on) 62') • Manager: György Bognár • Player of the match: Ádám Kovácsik, Paks 8.8 • Best player of Újpest: Aljoša Matko 8.2

17 August 2025 4	Paks	2–2	Zalaegerszeg	Paks
20:00 CEST	Papp (yellow card) 14'; Silye 49'; Lenzsér (yellow card) 90'; B. Tóth 90+3'	Report	Dénes (yellow card) 27' (yellow-red card) 72'; Várkonyi (yellow card) 38'; João Victor (yellow card) 45'; Croizet 69' (pen.); Krajcsovics 73'; Gundel-Takács (yellow card) 87'; Csonka (yellow card) 90+3'	Stadium: Fehérvári úti Stadion; Attendance: 2,512; Referee: Bence Csonka dr. Assistant referees: Péter Garai, Bence Belicza
Note: • Paks: Kovácsik — Vécsei (Pető (substituted on) 82'), Kinyik, Lenzsér — Papp (c) — Osváth, Silye, Ke. Horváth (Windecker (substituted on) 82'), Gyurkits (Böde (substituted on) 71') — Galambos (B. Tóth (substituted on) 64'), Hahn (Haraszti (substituted on) 64') • Manager: György Bognár • Player of the match: Ábel Krajcsovics, Zalaegerszeg 8.2 • Best player of Paks: Erik Silye and Ákos Kinyik 8.0 each

24 August 2025 5	MTK	2–3	Paks	Budapest
20:00 CEST	R. Molnár (yellow card) 33'; Szépe (yellow card) 40'; Átrok 59'; A. Horváth 66'; Széles (yellow card) 80'; Bognár (yellow card) 90'	Report	Vécsei 18'; Hahn 28' (pen.); Windecker 82' (pen.)	Stadium: Hidegkuti Nándor Stadion; Attendance: 2,376; Referee: Márió Zimmermann; Assistant referees: Ákos Berényi, Gergely Becséri
Note: • Paks: Kovácsik — Lenzsér, Kinyik, Vécsei — Osváth, Ke. Horváth (Böde (substituted on) 76'), Papp, Gyurkits (B. Tóth (substituted on) 55'), Silye (Hinora (substituted on) 76') — Haraszti (c) (Windecker (substituted on) 55'), Hahn (Pető (substituted on) 65') • Manager: György Bognár • Player of the match: Ádám Kovácsik, Paks 8.6 • Best player of MTK: Artúr Horváth 8.0

29 August 2025 6	Paks	3–0	Kazincbarcika	Paks
20:00 CEST	Papp (yellow card) 22'; Gyurkits (penalty missed) 43'; B. Tóth 55'; Kinyik (yellow card) 69'; Böde 70'; Baranyai 89' (o.g.)	Report	Szőke (yellow card) 15'; Major (yellow card) 53'; Šlogar (yellow card) 69'	Stadium: Fehérvári úti Stadion; Attendance: 2,689; Referee: József Erdős; Assistant referees: Péter Kóbor, Georgiou Theodoros
Note: • Paks: Kovácsik — Lenzsér, Kinyik, J. Szabó (c) — Hinora, Ke. Horváth, Papp (Haraszti (substituted on) 80'), Gyurkits (Windecker (substituted on) 46'), Zeke — Á. Szendrei (Böde (substituted on) 46'), B. Tóth (Hahn (substituted on) 84') • Manager: György Bognár • Player of the match: Dániel Gyollai, Kazincbarcika 9.8 • Best player of Paks: Kevin Horváth 9.0

20 September 2025 7	Nyíregyháza	1–1	Paks	Nyíregyháza
16:00 CEST	Manner (yellow card) 26'; Evangelou (yellow card) 66'; Edomwonyi 86'	Report	Hahn 46'; Papp (yellow card) 90+4'	Stadium: Városi Stadion; Attendance: 4,535; Referee: Imre Kovács; Assistant referees: Zoltán Horváth, Dániel Szalai
Note: • Paks: Kovácsik — Lenzsér, Vas, Vécsei — Osváth, Windecker (c), Papp, Ke. Horváth (Gyurkits (substituted on) 90+3'), Zeke — B. Tóth (Böde (substituted on) 80'), Hahn (Pető (substituted on) 77') • Manager: György Bognár • Player of the match: Bright Edomwonyi, Nyíregyháza 8.2 • Best player of Paks: Ádám Kovácsik 7.8

27 September 2025 8	Paks	3–2	Puskás Akadémia	Paks
20:00 CEST	Gyurkits 39', 87' (pen.); B. Tóth (yellow card) 65'; Ke. Horváth (yellow card) 73'; Papp (yellow card) 73'; Windecker 89'	Report	Lukács 8'; A. Németh 49'; Arutyunyan (yellow card) 67'; Szappanos (yellow card) 69'; Okeke (yellow card) 76'; Zs. Nagy (yellow card) 81'; Z. Nagy (yellow card) 88'	Stadium: Fehérvári úti Stadion; Attendance: 2,400; Referee: Gergő Bogár; Assistant referees: Vencel Tóth II, Viktor Nagy
Note: • Paks: Kovácsik — Lenzsér, Vas (Kinyik (substituted on) 43'), Vécsei — Osváth, Papp (c), Gyurkits, Zeke (Windecker (substituted on) 81') — Ke. Horváth (Pető (substituted on) 81') — B. Tóth (B. Balogh (substituted on) 90+2'), Hahn (Böde (substituted on) 46') • Manager: György Bognár • Player of the match: Gergő Gyurkits, Paks 8.3 • Best player of Puskás Akadémia: András Németh 8.2

5 October 2025 9	Ferencváros	2–2	Paks	Budapest
16:30 CEST	Szalai (yellow card) 19'; B. Varga 31'; Ötvös (yellow card) 47'; Yusuf (yellow card) 54'; Pešić 87'; Abu Fani (yellow card) 90+2'; Tóth (yellow card) 90+2'	Report	Kinyik (yellow card) 19'; Pető 21'; Haraszti (yellow card) 40'; B. Balogh (yellow card) 43'; Windecker 90+3' (pen.); Hahn (yellow card) 90+8'	Stadium: Groupama Aréna; Attendance: 14,071; Referee: Bence Csonka dr. Assistant referees: István Albert, Bence Belicza
Note: • Paks: Kovácsik — Hinora (Hahn (substituted on) 88'), Lenzsér, Kinyik, J. Szabó (c), Silye — Haraszti (Böde (substituted on) 65'), Windecker, B. Balogh, Pető (Ke. Horváth (substituted on) 65') — B. Tóth (Osváth (substituted on) 80') • Manager: György Bognár • Player of the match: Aleksandar Pešić, Ferencváros 7.9 • Best player of Paks: Milán Pető 7.8

18 October 2025 10	Paks	1–1	Debrecen	Paks
16:15 CEST	Ke. Horváth (yellow card) 32'; Hahn 50'	Report	Guerrero 56'; Mejias (yellow card) 90+3'; Lang (yellow card) 90+5'	Stadium: Fehérvári úti Stadion; Attendance: 3,504; Referee: Márton Rúsz; Assistant referees: Ákos Berényi, Viktor Nagy
Note: • Paks: Kovácsik — Lenzsér (M. Szekszárdi (substituted on) 36'), Kinyik, Vécsei — Osváth, Windecker (c), Papp, Ke. Horváth (Pető (substituted on) 67'), Silye — B. Tóth, Hahn (Böde (substituted on) 67') • Manager: György Bognár • Player of the match: János Hahn, Paks 8.2 • Best player of Debrecen: Ádám Varga 7.6

25 October 2025 11	Diósgyőr	2–1	Paks	Miskolc
17:00 CEST	Má. Mucsányi (yellow card) 51'; Šaponjić 56'; Acolatse (yellow card) 68' (goal) 88'; Sentić (yellow card) 90+2'	Report	Gyurkits (yellow card) 74'; Papp 90+2'	Stadium: Diósgyőri Stadion; Attendance: 4,001; Referee: Balázs Berke; Assistant referees: Vencel Tóth II., Balázs Szert
Note: • Paks: Kovácsik — Papp, Kinyik, Vécsei — Zeke, Windecker (c) (Haraszti (substituted on) 77'), Ke. Horváth (Pető (substituted on) 64'), Gyurkits (M. Szekszárdi (substituted on) 77'), Osváth — B. Tóth (Böde (substituted on) 64'), Hahn (Galambos (substituted on) 84') • Manager: György Bognár • Player of the match: Elton Acolatse, Diósgyőr 8.5 • Best player of Paks: Gergő Gyurkits 7.1

1 November 2025 12	Győri ETO	0–0	Paks	Győr
15:30 CET	Benbouali (yellow card) 21'; Schön (yellow card) 26'; Bánáti (yellow card) 30'; Bumba (yellow card) 74'	Report	Papp (yellow card) 44'; Lenzsér (red card) 66'; Windecker (yellow card) 74'	Stadium: ETO Park; Attendance: 5,099; Referee: Marcell Derdák; Assistant referees: Balázs Huszár, Gergely Becséri
Note: • Paks: Kovácsik — Lenzsér, Kinyik, Vécsei — Osváth, Windecker (c), Gyurkits (M. Szekszárdi (substituted on) 83'), Papp, Zeke (B. Balogh (substituted on) 90+4') — Ke. Horváth (Pető (substituted on) 83'), Hahn (B. Tóth (substituted on) 73') • Manager: György Bognár • Player of the match: Daniel Štefulj, Győri ETO 8.0 • Best player of Paks: Kristóf Papp 7.6

8 November 2025 13	Paks	5–3	Kisvárda	Paks
19:15 CET	Hahn 24', 57'; B. Balogh (yellow card) 45'; J. Szabó 52'; Böde 59'; Galambos 83'; Gyurkits (yellow card) 90+2'	Report	Popoola 37' (yellow card) 40' (yellow-red card) 90+2'; Bíró 62', 78'; Chlumecký (yellow card) 72'; Cipetić (yellow card) 77'	Stadium: Fehérvári úti Stadion; Attendance: 2,410; Referee: József Erdős; Assistant referees: Vencel Tóth II, József Aradi
Note: • Paks: Kovácsik — Papp, Kinyik, J. Szabó — Osváth, Windecker, B. Balogh, Ke. Horváth (Galambos (substituted on) 80'), Silye (Zeke (substituted on) 88') — Hahn (Haraszti (substituted on) 80'), Böde (c) (Gyurkits (substituted on) 67') • Manager: György Bognár • Player of the match: Bence Bíró, Kisvárda 8.6 • Best player of Paks: János Hahn 7.8

23 November 2025 14	Paks	1–3	Újpest	Paks
16:00 CET	Lenzsér (yellow card) 50'; Böde 84'; Kinyik (yellow card) 90+4'	Report	Matko 23', 75'; Fiola (yellow card) 37'; Beridze (penalty missed) 49'; Tajti 57'; Ganea (yellow card) 90+4'; Rasak (yellow card) 90+4'	Stadium: Fehérvári úti Stadion; Attendance: 3,012; Referee: Márton Rúsz; Assistant referees: Péter Kóbor, Péter Ország
Note: • Paks: Kovácsik — Lenzsér, Kinyik, Vécsei — Hinora (Osváth (substituted on) 58'), Gyurkits (Pető (substituted on) 76'), Papp, B. Balogh (c) (Ke. Horváth (substituted on) 46'), Zeke (Silye (substituted on) 58') — Galambos (Böde (substituted on) 46'), Hahn • Manager: György Bognár • Player of the match: Aljoša Matko, Újpest 8.4 • Best player of Paks: Ádám Kovácsik 7.4

29 November 2025 15	Zalaegerszeg	1–0	Paks	Zalaegerszeg
12:30 CET	B. Kiss (yellow card) 52'; Amato (yellow card) 56'; Krajcsovics (yellow card) 71'; Calderón (yellow card) 83'; N. Szendrei 90+3' (yellow card) 90+3'	Report	Kinyik (yellow card) 12'; Osváth (yellow card) 44'; Papp (yellow card) 55'; Hahn (yellow card) 83'	Stadium: ZTE Arena; Attendance: 1,872; Referee: Péter Zierkelbach; Assistant referees: Balázs Huszár, István Szécsényi
Note: • Paks: Kovácsik — Lenzsér, Kinyik, J. Szabó — Osváth, Papp, Vécsei (Á. Szendrei (substituted on) 72'), Zeke — Pető (Hahn (substituted on) 46'), Ke. Horváth — Böde (c) (Gyurkits (substituted on) 72') • Manager: György Bognár • Player of the match: Norbert Szendrei, Zalaegerszeg 8.5 • Best player of Paks: Márió Zeke 8.3

6 December 2025 16	Paks	3–1	MTK	Paks
17:00 CET	Osváth 20' (yellow card) 53'; M. Szekszárdi (yellow card) 40'; Böde 67', 69'; Papp (yellow card) 87'	Report	Átrok (yellow card) 34'; Á. Molnár (yellow card) 38'; A. Horváth (yellow card) 46'; Polievka 55'	Stadium: Fehérvári úti Stadion; Attendance: 2,011; Referee: Ferenc Karakó; Assistant referees: Georgiou Theodoros, Péter Garai
Note: • Paks: Kovácsik — M. Szekszárdi, Vécsei, J. Szabó (c) — Osváth, Ke. Horváth, Papp, Gyurkits (B. Balogh (substituted on) 59'), Zeke — Hahn (Böde (substituted on) 59'), B. Tóth (Á. Szendrei (substituted on) 81') • Manager: György Bognár • Player of the match: Dániel Böde, Paks 7.7 • Best player of MTK: Róbert Polievka 7.3

14 December 2025 17	Kazincbarcika	0–2	Paks	Mezőkövesd
12:15 CET	Šlogar (yellow card) 13'; Rasheed (yellow card) 73'	Report	Á. Szendrei 41', 60' (yellow card) 45'; M. Szekszárdi (yellow card) 64'; B. Balogh (yellow card) 67'; Haraszti (yellow card) 90+2'	Stadium: Városi Stadion; Attendance: 394; Referee: Attila Molnár; Assistant referees: Zoltán Horváth, Péter Ország
Note: • Paks: Kovácsik — Osváth, M. Szekszárdi, J. Szabó (c), Vécsei, Zeke (Silye (substituted on) 90') — B. Balogh, Papp, Ke. Horváth (Pető (substituted on) 77') — Á. Szendrei (Haraszti (substituted on) 77'), B. Tóth (Böde (substituted on) 66') • Manager: György Bognár • Player of the match: Attila Osváth, Paks 8.3 • Best player of Kazincbarcika: Bence Juhász 7.9

20 December 2025 18	Paks	2–1	Nyíregyháza	Paks
15:30 CET	B. Tóth 10', 36'; Ke. Horváth (yellow card) 23'; B. Balogh (yellow card) 33'; Silye (yellow card) 69'	Report	Alaxai (yellow card) 5'; Manner (yellow card) 31'; Temesvári 62'; Benczenleitner (yellow card) 85'; D. Nagy (yellow card) 87'	Stadium: Fehérvári úti Stadion; Attendance: 2,130; Referee: Gergő Bogár; Assistant referees: Dávid Rózsa, Viktor Nagy
Note: • Paks: Simon — Kinyik, J. Szabó (c), M. Szekszárdi — Osváth, Ke. Horváth (Windecker (substituted on) 82'), Papp, B. Balogh (Gyurkits (substituted on) 73'), Silye (Zeke (substituted on) 73') — Á. Szendrei (Böde (substituted on) 63'), B. Tóth (Pető (substituted on) 82') • Manager: György Bognár • Player of the match: Dániel Kovács, Nyíregyháza 7.9 • Best player of Paks: Milán Szekszárdi 7.5

24 January 2026 19	Puskás Akadémia	1–2	Paks	Felcsút
19:45 CET	Ásványi (yellow card) 15'; Zs. Nagy 23' (pen.) (yellow card) 30'; Vékony (yellow card) 50'; Markgráf (yellow card) 89'; L. Duarte (yellow card) 90+4'	Report	Ke. Horváth 17' (pen.); Kovácsik (yellow card) 21'; Osváth 84'	Stadium: Pancho Aréna; Attendance: 789; Referee: Ferenc Karakó; Assistant referees: Zoltán Horváth, Péter Ország
Note: • Paks: Kovácsik — Lenzsér, J. Szabó (c), Vécsei — Osváth, Windecker (Ádám (substituted on) 78'), Papp, Ke. Horváth, Zeke — B. Tóth (B. Balogh (substituted on) 90+1'), Á. Szendrei (Gyurkits (substituted on) 59') • Manager: György Bognár • Player of the match: Péter Szappanos, Puskás Akadémia 9.2 • Best player of Paks: Attila Osváth 9.0

1 February 2026 20	Paks	0–1	Ferencváros	Paks
15:15 CET	Zeke (yellow card) 37'; Osváth (yellow card) 44'	Report	Kovačević (yellow card) 39'; B. Nagy (yellow card) 41'; Ötvös (yellow card) 61'; Gruber 71'; Gróf (yellow card) 90+1'	Stadium: Fehérvári úti Stadion; Attendance: 4,691; Referee: Gergő Bogár; Assistant referees: István Albert, Bence Belicza
Note: • Paks: Kovácsik — Zeke (Silye (substituted on) 76'), Vécsei, J. Szabó (c), Lenzsér, Osváth — Papp, Ke. Horváth (Máté (substituted on) 83'), Windecker (Gyurkits (substituted on) 76') — Á. Szendrei (Ádám (substituted on) 61'), B. Tóth (Hahn (substituted on) 83') • Manager: György Bognár • Player of the match: Zsombor Gruber, Ferencváros 7.7 • Best player of Paks: Attila Osváth 7.4

7 February 2026 21	Debrecen	1–0	Paks	Debrecen
14:45 CET	Bárány 50'; Batik (yellow card) 76'; Szuhodovszki (yellow card) 84'	Report	Ádám (yellow card) 90'	Stadium: Nagyerdei Stadion; Attendance: 4,743; Referee: Balázs Berke; Assistant referees: Péter Kóbor, Dávid Rózsa
Note: • Paks: Kovácsik — Hinora, Lenzsér, J. Szabó (c), Vécsei, Zeke — Ke. Horváth (Pesti (substituted on) 73'), Papp, (B. Balogh (Windecker (substituted on) 63') — Á. Szendrei (Gyurkits (substituted on) 63'), Hahn (Ádám (substituted on) 63') • Manager: György Bognár • Player of the match: Josua Mejías, Debrecen 8.1 • Best player of Paks: Bence Lenzsér 7.4

14 February 2026 22	Paks	1–2	Diósgyőr	Paks
19:15 CET	Hinora (yellow card) 43'; Alaxai (yellow card) 59'; Gyurkits 90+2'; Lenzsér (yellow card) 90+5'	Report	Má. Mucsányi (yellow card) 13'; Colley (yellow card) 22'; Holdampf (yellow card) 34'; Bárdos (yellow card) 60'; Bokros (yellow card) 68'; Sentić (yellow card) 77'; Roguljić 85'; A. Keita 90' (pen.)	Stadium: Fehérvári úti Stadion; Attendance: 2,375; Referee: Imre Kovács; Assistant referees: Bence Belicza, István Szécsényi
Note: • Paks: Kovácsik — Bévárdi, Lenzsér, Alaxai, J. Szabó (c), Zeke (B. Balogh (substituted on) 85') — Ke. Horváth, Papp (Hahn (substituted on) 38'), Windecker, Hinora (Gyurkits (substituted on) 74') — B. Tóth (Ádám (substituted on) 74') • Manager: György Bognár • Player of the match: Karlo Sentić, Diósgyőr 8.6 • Best player of Paks: Zsombor Bévárdi 7.7

22 February 2026 23	Paks	3–4	Győri ETO	Paks
17:30 CET	Gyurkits (yellow card) 40'; B. Tóth 42' (yellow card) 80'; Lenzsér (yellow card) 43'; B. Balogh 78'; Ádám 85' (pen.)	Report	Schön 20', 33' (yellow card) 43'; Vitális 25'; Csinger 73'; Krpić (yellow card) 76'; R. Tóth (yellow card) 88'	Stadium: Fehérvári úti Stadion; Attendance: 2,301; Referee: Péter Antal; Assistant referees: Balázs Buzás, József Aradi
Note: • Paks: Kovácsik — Bévárdi (Zeke (substituted on) 60'), Lenzsér, J. Szabó (c), Vécsei, Silye (M. Szekszárdi (substituted on) 75') — Hinora (Ádám (substituted on) 46'), B. Balogh — Ke. Horváth (Máté (substituted on) 66'), Gyurkits (Windecker (substituted on) 46') — B. Tóth • Manager: György Bognár • Player of the match: Milán Vitális, Győri ETO 8.4 • Best player of Paks: Barna Tóth 7.6

28 February 2026 24	Kisvárda	2–1	Paks	Kisvárda
14:30 CET	Oláh (yellow card) 19'; Mbock 50'; Cipetić 65' (pen.)	Report	Bévárdi (yellow card) 27'; Hahn 45+1' (pen.); Á. Szendrei (yellow card) 53'; Alaxai (yellow card) 71'; M. Szekszárdi (yellow card) 90+3'	Stadium: Várkerti Stadion; Attendance: 1,620; Referee: Márió Zimmermann; Assistant referees: Balázs Szalai, Dávid Rózsa
Note: • Paks: Kovácsik — Bévárdi (Gyurkits (substituted on) 68'), M. Szekszárdi, Alaxai, J. Szabó (c), Silye — Windecker, B. Balogh (Ádám (substituted on) 68'), Máté (Ke. Horváth (substituted on) 56') — Á. Szendrei (B. Tóth (substituted on) 56'), Hahn • Manager: György Bognár • Player of the match: Hianga'a Mbock, Kisvárda 7.9 • Best player of Paks: Ádám Kovácsik 7.1

7 March 2026 25	Újpest	0–0	Paks	Budapest
19:30 CET	Ljujić (yellow card) 60'; Krajcsovics (yellow card) 67'; G. Bodnár (yellow card) 71'; Fiola (red card) 81'	Report	Ke. Horváth (yellow card) 16'; B. Balogh (yellow card) 75'; Lenzsér (yellow card) 81'	Stadium: Szusza Ferenc Stadion; Attendance: 5,117; Referee: Márton Rúsz; Assistant referees: Bence Belicza, Ákos Berényi
Note: • Paks: Kovácsik — Bévárdi (Hinora (substituted on) 83'), Lenzsér, J. Szabó (c), Vécsei, Zeke — Hahn (Á. Szendrei (substituted on) 46'), Windecker, B. Balogh, Ke. Horváth (Máté (substituted on) 83') — B. Tóth (Ádám (substituted on) 64') • Manager: György Bognár • Player of the match: Dávid Banai, Újpest 8.7 • Best player of Paks: Kristóf Hinora 7.6

14 March 2026 26	Paks	1–1	Zalaegerszeg	Paks
17:00 CET	Papp (yellow card) 8'; J. Szabó (yellow card) 28'; Hahn 45+1' (pen.)	Report	Várkonyi (red card) 45+1'; João Victor 52'; Maxsuell (yellow card) 64'	Stadium: Fehérvári úti Stadion; Attendance: 2,245; Referee: Bence Csonka dr. Assistant referees: Norbert Bornemissza, István Szécsényi
Note: • Paks: Kovácsik — Vécsei, Lenzsér, J. Szabó (c) — Bévárdi, Papp (Alaxai (substituted on) 90+2'), Windecker (Máté (substituted on) 62'), Ke. Horváth (Gyurkits (substituted on) 79'), Zeke (Silye (substituted on) 79') — B. Tóth, Hahn (Böde (substituted on) 62') • Manager: György Bognár • Player of the match: Bence Gundel-Takács, Zalaegerszeg 8.2 • Best player of Paks: Bálint Vécsei 7.9

20 March 2026 27	MTK	0–2	Paks	Budapest
20:00 CET		Report	Á. Szendrei 32'; Böde 83'	Stadium: Hidegkuti Nándor Stadion; Attendance: 3,522; Referee: Balázs Berke; Assistant referees: József Aradi, Tibor Csatári

4 April 2026 28	Paks	5–1	Kazincbarcika	Paks
17:00 CEST	Á. Szendrei 14', 65'; B. Balogh (yellow card) 22'; Gyurkits (yellow card) 68'; Böde 82', 89'; Ádám 90+4' (pen.)	Report	Szőke (yellow card) 43'; Pukhtieiev (yellow card) 61' (goal) 80'; Kártik (yellow card) 64'; Rácz (yellow card) 74'; Juhász (yellow card) 90+4'	Stadium: Fehérvári úti Stadion; Attendance: 2,410; Referee: Bence Hanyecz; Assistant referees: Balázs Buzás, István Szécsényi

11 April 2026 29	Nyíregyháza	2–0	Paks	Nyíregyháza
20:00 CEST	Antonov 9'; Manner (yellow card) 53'; Temesvári 72'	Report	Zeke (yellow card) 46'	Stadium: Városi Stadion; Attendance: 5,343; Referee: Gergő Bogár; Assistant referees: Gergely Becséri, Dávid Rózsa
Note: • Paks: Gyetván — M. Szekszárdi, Vas, J. Szabó (c) — Hinora (Bévárdi (substituted on) 85'), Papp (Ádám (substituted on) 74'), Vécsei, Windecker (Ke. Horváth (substituted on) 69'), Zeke — Hahn (Böde (substituted on) 46'), Á. Szendrei (B. Tóth (substituted on) 46') • Manager: György Bognár • Player of the match: Attila Temesvári, Nyíregyháza 8.5 • Best player of Paks: Bálint Vécsei 7.3

19 April 2026 30	Paks	1–0	Puskás Akadémia	Paks
14:15 CEST	Hahn (penalty missed) 15'; Papp (yellow card) 31'; Böde 34' (yellow card) 63'; Bévárdi (yellow card) 37'; J. Szabó (red card) 62'	Report	Okeke (yellow card) 23'; Golla (yellow card) 29'; Magyar (yellow card) 65'	Stadium: Fehérvári úti Stadion; Attendance: 3,110; Referee: Ferenc Karakó; Assistant referees: István Albert, Bence Belicza
Note: • Paks: Gyetván — Vas, J. Szabó, Vécsei — Papp, Bévárdi, Silye, Ke. Horváth (Alaxai (substituted on) 76'), Gyurkits (Windecker (substituted on) 65') — Hahn (O. Tamás (substituted on) 64' (substituted off) 80' (Máté (substituted on) 80')), Böde (c) (M. Szekszárdi (substituted on) 76') • Manager: György Bognár • Player of the match: Gábor Vas, Paks 7.6 • Best player of Puskás Akadémia: Georgy Arutyunyan 7.2

26 April 2026 31	Ferencváros	2–0	Paks	Budapest
17:00 CEST	Joseph 42', 66'; O'Dowda (yellow card) 32'; Corbu (yellow card) 57' (yellow-red card) 86'	Report	Vécsei (yellow card) 35'; Ádám (yellow card) 46'; Böde (yellow card) 80'; Gyurkits (yellow card) 83'	Stadium: Groupama Aréna; Attendance: 11,127; Referee: Gergő Bogár; Assistant referees: Norbert Bornemissza, Gergely Becséri
Note: • Paks: Gyetván — Hinora (Silye (substituted on) 76'), Alaxai, Vas, Vécsei, Zeke — Windecker (c) (Máté (substituted on) 64'), Gyurkits, Ke. Horváth — Á. Szendrei (Böde (substituted on) 64'), Hahn (Ádám (substituted on) 46') • Manager: György Bognár • Player of the match: Gabi Kanichowsky, Ferencváros 8.9 • Best player of Paks: Gábor Vas 6.9

3 May 2026 32	Paks	5–2	Debrecen	Paks
13:30 CEST	Ke. Horváth 5' (pen.) (yellow card) 47'; M. Szekszárdi (yellow card) 18'; Hahn (yellow card) 23'; Böde 25' (yellow card) 42'; Windecker 66'; Silye 70'; Zeke 90+5'	Report	Lang 7' (yellow card) 60'; Guerrero 44'; Mejias (yellow card) 55'; Manzanara (yellow card) 89'; T. Szűcs (yellow card) 90+4'	Stadium: Fehérvári úti Stadion; Attendance: 3,437; Referee: Tamás Bognár; Assistant referees: Bence Belicza, Dániel Szalai

16 May 2026 33	Diósgyőr	1–3	Paks	Miskolc
17:15 CEST	B. Kiss (yellow card) 5'; Holdampf (yellow card) 30'; M. Tamás (yellow card) 62'; Galántai 90+3'	Report	Hahn 1', 31'; Gyurkits 18'; B. Tóth (yellow card) 63'	Stadium: Diósgyőri Stadion; Attendance: 104; Referee: Balázs Berke; Assistant referees: Gergely Becséri, Dávid Rózsa

=== Magyar Kupa ===
13 September 2025 R64	Szajol (Megyei Bajnokság I)	1–5	Paks	Szajol
15:00 CEST	Szentmiklósi 53'	Report	Hahn 8'; Haraszti 26'; Pető 81'; Böde 74', 85'	Stadium: Sporttelep; Referee: Tamás Ujhelyi; Assistant referees: István László, Pál Vrbovszki
Note: • Paks: Simon — Silye, J. Szabó (c), Vas (Kinyik (substituted on) 46'), Hinora — Windecker, Balogh, Pető — Haraszti (Gyurkits (substituted on) 62'), Hahn (Böde (substituted on) 46'), Galambos • Manager: György Bognár

29 October 2025 R32	Martfű (NB III)	1–4	Paks	Martfű
12:30 CET	Prozlik (yellow card) 25'; Kinyig 29'; Mahler (yellow card) 59'	Report	J. Szabó 22'; Böde 59', 62'; B. Balogh 79'	Stadium: Sporttelep; Referee: Ákos Takács; Assistant referees: Norbert Szilágyi, Szabin Topálszki
Note: • Paks: Gyetván — Szekszárdi, Kinyik (Zs. Éger (substituted on) 80'), J. Szabó (c) — Hinora, Haraszti (Ke. Horváth (substituted on) 65'), B. Balogh, Pető (Gyurkits (substituted on) 54'), Silye — Galambos (B. Tóth (substituted on) 54'), Böde (Májik (substituted on) 65') • Manager: György Bognár

11 February 2026 R16	Paks	2–6	Diósgyőr	Paks
20:00 CET	Lenzsér (yellow card) 14'; Windecker 25'; Ádám 43'; Alaxai (yellow card) 64'; Ke. Horváth (yellow card) 74'	Report	Croizet 1'; Sajbán 12'; Má. Mucsányi 20', 60'; Colley 28', 47' (yellow card) 49'; Bokros (yellow card) 48'	Stadium: Fehérvári úti Stadion; Attendance: 1,312; Referee: Mihály Káprály; Assistant referees: Zoltán Horváth, Gergely Becséri
Note: • Paks: Kovácsik — Lenzsér (Alaxai (substituted on) 31'), Szekszárdi, Vécsei (O. Tamás (substituted on) 80') — Hinora (Bévárdi (substituted on) 46'), Gyurkits, Windecker (Ke. Horváth (substituted on) 59'), B. Balogh, Silye — B. Tóth (Hahn (substituted on) 59'), Ádám • Manager: György Bognár

=== UEFA Europa League ===
The Paks FC will participate in the competition as the winner of the 2024–25 Magyar Kupa (Hungarian domestic cup).

==== First qualifying round ====
The draw for the first qualifying round was held on 17 June 2025.

The opponent in the UEFA Europa League first qualifying round is CFR Cluj, winners the 2024–25 Cupa României (domestic cup).

10 July 2025 First leg	Paks	0–0	(Romania) CFR Cluj	Paks
19:00 CEST	Lenzsér (yellow card) 58'; Windecker (yellow card) 63'	Report	Léo Bolgado (yellow card) 80'	Stadium: Fehérvári úti Stadion; Attendance: 4,028; Referee: Pavle Ilić (Serbia); Assistant referees: Slobodan Pavlović, Uroš Radovanović
Note: PAKS: Kovácsik — Lenzsér (Kinyik (substituted on) 65'), Vas (J. Szabó (substituted on) 89'), Vécsei — Hinora, Papp, Windecker, Balogh, Zeke — Haraszti (c) (Hahn (substituted on) 73') — Tóth (Böde (substituted on) 73') • On the bench: Simon (GK), Gyetván (GK), Galambos, Gyurkits, K. Horváth, Silye, Szekszárdi, Szendrei • Manager: György Bognár

17 July 2025 Second leg	CFR Cluj (Romania)	3–0	Paks	Cluj-Napoca
19:30 (20:30 EEST (UTC+3))	Fică 35'; Korenica (yellow card) 45+1'; Đoković (yellow card) 66'; Munteanu 85'; Muhar 90'	Report	Kinyik (yellow card) 5'; Vécsei (penalty missed) 66', (penalty missed) 69'	Stadium: Dr. Constantin Rădulescu Stadium; Attendance: 6,512; Referee: Kyriakos Athanasiou (Cyprus); Assistant referees: Marios Kalogirou, Pavlos Georgiou
Note: PAKS: Kovácsik — Kinyik, Vas, J. Szabó (c) — Hinora, Papp (Balogh (substituted on) 86'), Vécsei, Windecker, Zeke (Haraszti (substituted on) 81') — Gyurkits (Tóth (substituted on) 46') — Hahn (Böde (substituted on) 69') • On the bench: Simon (GK), Gyetván (GK), Silye, Szendrei, Pető, Szekszárdi, K. Horváth, Galambos • Manager: György Bognár

CFR Cluj won 3–0 on aggregate. Paks could continue in the UEFA Conference League, second qualifying round.

=== UEFA Conference League ===
==== Second qualifying round ====
24 July 2025 First leg	Paks	1–0	(Slovakia) Maribor	Paks
20:00 CEST	Vécsei (yellow card) 36'; Windecker 52'	Report	Rekik (yellow card) 26'; Vrhovec (yellow card) 85'	Stadium: Fehérvári úti Stadion; Attendance: 2,398; Referee: Rob Harvey (Republic of Ireland); Assistant referees: Wayne McDonnell, Robert Clarke
Note: • PAKS: Kovácsik — Kinyik (Gyurkits (substituted on) 90+2'), Vas, Vécsei — Hinora, Windecker, Papp, Balogh, Zeke — Haraszti (c) (Böde (substituted on) 78') — Tóth (Hahn (substituted on) 70') • On the bench: Simon (GK), Gyetván (GK), Lapu, Silye, Szendrei, K. Horváth, Szekszárdi, Galambos, J. Szabó • Manager: György Bognár

31 July 2025 Second leg	Maribor (Slovenia)	1–1 (1–2 agg.)	Paks	Maribor, Slovenia
20:00 CEST	Tshipamba 34'	Report	Papp 57'	Stadium: Ljudski vrt Attendance: 6,000; Referee: Dennis Higler (Netherlands); Assistant referees: Stefan De Groot, Murat Kücükerbir
Note: • PAKS: Kovácsik — Kinyik, J. Szabó (c), Vécsei — Hinora, Windecker, Papp, Balogh (K. Horváth (substituted on) 90+2'), Zeke — Haraszti (Gyurkits (substituted on) 75') — Tóth (Böde (substituted on) 83') • On the bench: Simon (GK), Ádám, Hahn, Silye, Szendrei, Szekszárdi • Manager: György Bognár

Paks won 2–1 on aggregate.

==== Third qualifying round ====
7 August 2025 First leg	Polissya Zhytomyr (Ukraine)	3–0	Paks	Prešov, Slovakia (Note: Due to the Russian invasion of Ukraine, Ukrainian teams were required to play their home matches at neutral venues until further notice.)
20:00 CEST	Sarapiy (yellow card) 27'; Andriyevskyi 41'; Beskorovaynyi 45+1'; Krushynskyi (yellow card) 49'; Lednev 59'; Mykhaylichenko (red card) 90+2'	Report	Kinyik (yellow card) 90+5'	Stadium: Futbal Tatran Arena; Attendance: 1,203; Referee: Joakim Östling (Sweden); Assistant referees: Robin Wilde, Simon Kristensson
Note: • Paks: Kovácsik — Vécsei, Kinyik, J. Szabó (c) — Zeke, Windecker, Balogh (Osváth (substituted on) 46'), Papp (Szekszárdi (substituted on) 81'), Hinora (K. Horváth (substituted on) 71') — Tóth (Böde (substituted on) 64'), Haraszti (Hahn (substituted on) 46') • On the bench: Simon (GK), Debreceni, Silye, Szendrei, Gyurkits, Pető • Manager: György Bognár • Player of the match: Bohdan Lyednyev, Polissya Zhytomyr 8.6 • Best player of Paks: Kristóf Hinora 7.0

14 August 2025 Second leg	Paks	2–1 (2–4 agg.)	(Ukraine) Polissya Zhytomyr	Paks
19:00 CEST	Szekszárdi (yellow card) 8'; J. Szabó 39'; Tóth 49'; Osváth (yellow card) 89'	Report	Beskorovaynyi (yellow card) 19'; Kravchenko (yellow card) 38'; Volynets (yellow card) 80'; Talles Costa 90+6'	Stadium: Fehérvári úti Stadion; Attendance: 1,812; Referee: Daniel Schlager (Germany); Assistant referees: Sven Waschitzki, Tobias Fritsch
Note: Paks: Kovácsik — Szekszárdi (Lenzsér (substituted on) 79'), Kinyik, J. Szabó — Hinora (Osváth (substituted on) 87'), Windecker (Pető (substituted on) 79'), Vécsei, Zeke — Haraszti (Papp (substituted on) 69') — Böde (c) (Hahn (substituted on) 69'), Tóth • On the bench: Simon (GK), Debreceni, Silye, Szendrei, Gyurkits, K. Horváth, Galambos • Manager: György Bognár • Player of the match: Ádám Kovácsik, Paks 9.0 • Best player of Polissya Zhytomyr: Talles Costa 7.3

Polissya Zhytomyr won 4–2 on aggregate.

== See also ==
- List of Paksi FC seasons
- List of Paksi FC managers
