= 2024 Magyar Kupa final =

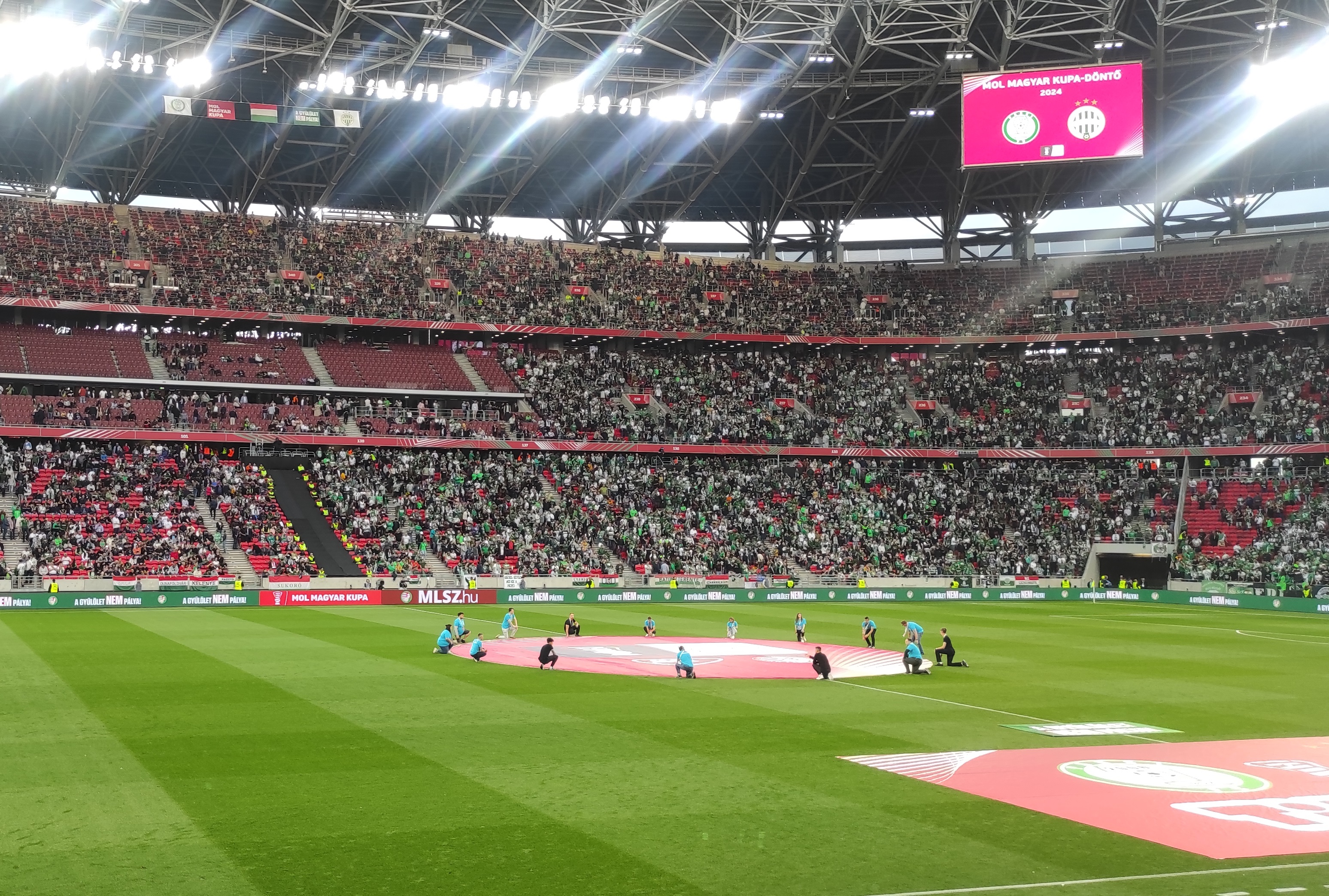
- The Puskás Aréna prior to the final.
- Event: 2023–24 Magyar Kupa
Paks	Ferencváros
2	0
- After extra time
- Date: 15 May 2024
- Venue: Puskás Aréna, Budapest
- Man of the Match: Péter Szappanos (Paks)
- Referee: Balázs Berke
- Attendance: 51,900

The 2024 Magyar Kupa final decided the winners of the 2023–24 Magyar Kupa, the 84th season of Hungarian premier football cup, the Magyar Kupa. The match was played on 15 May 2024 at the Puskás Aréna in Budapest between Paks and Ferencváros.

Paks had won the match 2–0 after extra time, securing the Magyar Kupa for the first time in their history.

== Teams ==
Team	Previous finals appearances (bold indicates winners)
Paks	1 (2022)
Ferencváros	33 (1912, **1913**, **1922**, **1927**, **1928**, 1931, 1932, **1933**, **1935**, **1942**, **1943**, **1944**, **1958**, 1966, **1972**, **1974**, **1976**, 1977, **1978**, 1979, 1986, 1989, **1991**, **1993**, **1994**, **1995**, **2003**, **2004**, 2005, **2015**, **2016**, **2017**, **2022**)

== Venue ==
The final has been originally played at the rebuilt Puskás Aréna since it opened, in 2020. This final was the fifth Magyar Kupa final in this stadium.

== Route to the final ==
Note: In all results below, the score of the finalist is given first (H: home; A: away).

Paks			Round	Ferencváros		
Opponent	Result			Opponent	Result	
Bye			First round	Bye		
Bye			Second round	Bye		
BKV Előre (NB III)	7–0	(A)	Round of 64	Nagyecsed (MB I)	8–0	(A)
Honvéd (NB II)	2–2 (5–4 p)	(A)	Round of 32	Puskás Akadémia (NB I)	4–3 (a.e.t.)	(H)
Újpest (NB I)	2–1 (a.e.t.)	(A)	Round of 16	Debreceni VSC (NB I)	1–1 (5–3 p)	(A)
Vasas (NB II)	5–2 (a.e.t.)	(A)	Quarter-finals	Diósgyőr (NB I)	2–0	(A)
Kisvárda (NB I)	2–1	(H)	Semi-finals	Nyíregyháza (NB II)	2–1	(A)

== Match ==
=== Details ===
15 May 2024
19:30 CEST (UTC+2)

Paks	2–0 (a.e.t.)	Ferencváros
Papp 98'; Haraszti 120+2'	Report

Puskás Aréna, Budapest
Attendance: 51,900
Referee: Balázs Berke

**Paks**	**Ferencváros**

GK	1	(Hungary) Péter Szappanos	(yellow card) 117'
RWB	11	(Hungary) Attila Osváth	(yellow card) 114'
CB	12	(Hungary) Gábor Vas
CB	2	(Hungary) Ákos Kinyik	(yellow card) 16'
CB	24	(Hungary) Bence Lenzsér
LWB	30	(Hungary) János Szabó (c)
CM	21	(Hungary) Kristóf Papp
CM	5	(Hungary) Bálint Vécsei	(red card) 38'
CM	22	(Hungary) József Windecker		(substituted off) 86'
CF	9	(Hungary) János Hahn		(substituted off) 72'
CF	15	(Hungary) Norbert Könyves	(yellow card) 45+1'	(substituted off) 46'
Substitutes:
GK	25	(Hungary) Barnabás Simon
DF	14	(Hungary) Erik Silye
DF	20	(Hungary) Krisztián Kovács
DF	77	(Hungary) Zsolt Gévay
MF	8	(Hungary) Balázs Balogh		(substituted on) 46'	(substituted off) 120'
MF	17	(Hungary) Bence Kocsis
MF	26	(Hungary) Szabolcs Mezei		(substituted on) 119'
MF	27	(Hungary) Bálint Szabó		(substituted on) 86'	(substituted off) 119'
FW	7	(Hungary) Alen Skribek
FW	10	(Hungary) Zsolt Haraszti		(substituted on) 120'
FW	13	(Hungary) Dániel Böde		(substituted on) 72'
FW	29	(Hungary) Barna Tóth
Manager:
(Hungary) György Bognár

GK	1	(Hungary) Ádám Varga
RB	21	(Hungary) Endre Botka (c)	(yellow card) 90+1'
CB	27	(France) Ibrahim Cissé
CB	22	(Suriname) Myenty Abena	(red card) 75'
LB	17	(Bosnia and Herzegovina) Eldar Ćivić		(substituted off) 91'
CM	80	(Ivory Coast) Habib Maïga		(substituted off) 59'
CM	7	(Tunisia) Ben Romdhane		(substituted off) 55'
AM	15	(Israel) Mohammad Abu Fani
RF	20	(Mali) Adama Traoré
LF	10	(Brazil) Marquinhos		(substituted off) 82'
CF	19	(Hungary) Barnabás Varga		(substituted off) 82'
Substitutes:
GK	90	(Hungary) Dénes Dibusz
DF	23	(Hungary) Lóránd Pászka
DF	31	(United States) Henry Wingo
DF	44	(France) Ismaïl Aaneba
DF	99	(Ecuador) Cristian Ramírez		(substituted on) 91'
MF	16	(Norway) Kristoffer Zachariassen		(substituted on) 82'
MF	25	(Latvia) Cebrail Makreckis
MF	33	(Bosnia and Herzegovina) Stjepan Lončar		(substituted on) 59'
MF	55	(Hungary) Bálint Katona
MF	76	(Hungary) Krisztián Lisztes		(substituted on) 82'	(substituted off) 100'
MF	77	(Armenia) Edgar Sevikyan	(yellow card) 112'	(substituted on) 100'
FW	11	(Bosnia and Herzegovina) Kenan Kodro		(substituted on) 55'
Manager:
(Serbia) Dejan Stanković

Man of the Match:
Péter Szappanos (Paks)

Assistant referees:
Norbert Bornemissza
Balázs Szert
Fourth official:
Mihály Káprály
Video assistant referee:
József Erdős
Assistant video assistant referee:
Balázs Buzás

**Match rules**

- 90 minutes
- 30 minutes of extra time if necessary
- Penalty shoot-out if scores still level
- Twelve named substitutes
- Maximum of five substitutions, with a sixth allowed in extra time
