= 2016 Magyar Kupa final =

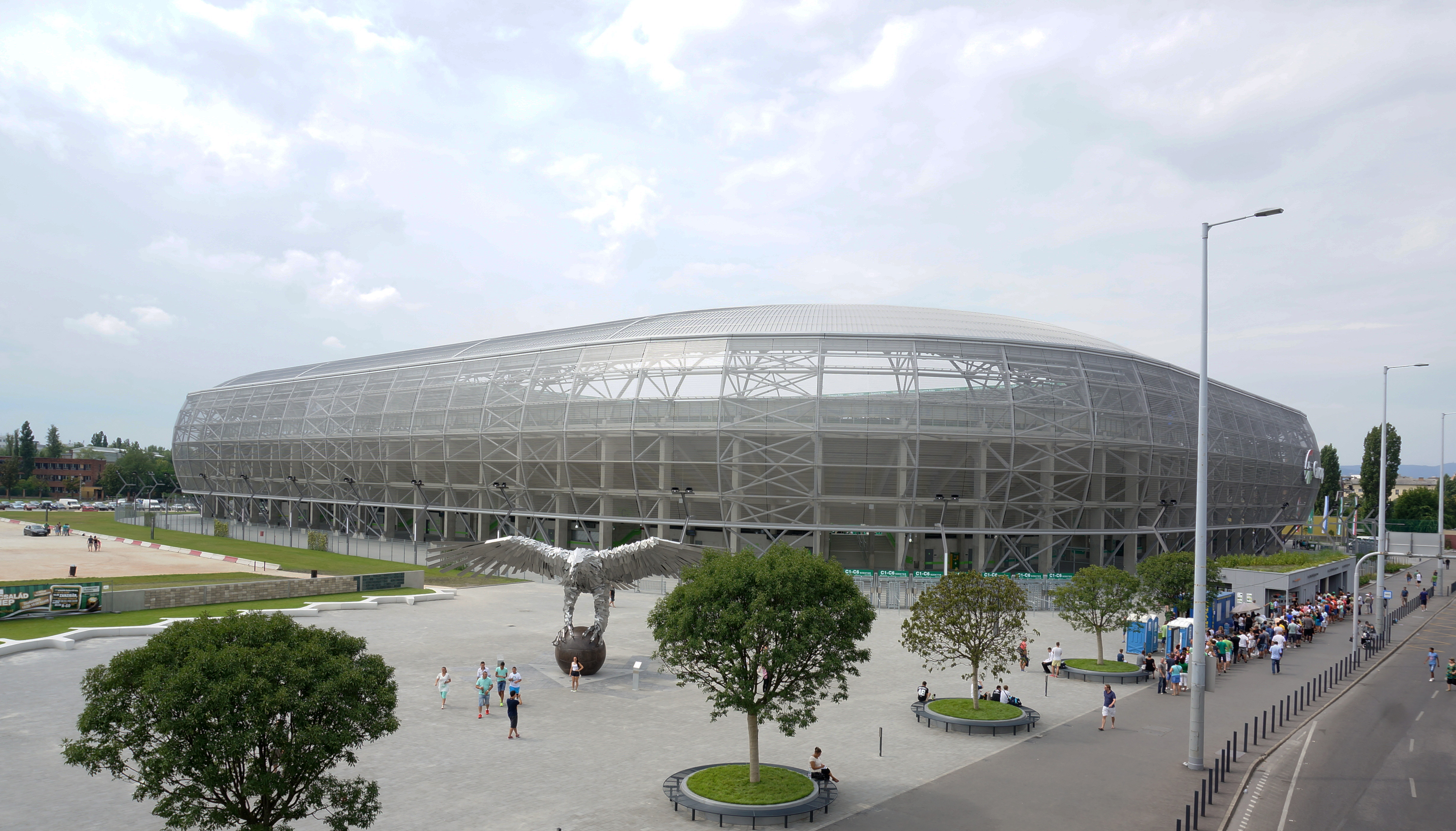
- Groupama Arena hosted the final
- Event: 2015–16 Magyar Kupa
| Újpest | Ferencváros |
| 0 | 1 |
- Date: 7 May 2016
- Venue: Groupama Arena, Budapest
- Referee: Zoltán Iványi
- Attendance: 19,000

The Magyar Kupa final was the final match of the 2015–16 Magyar Kupa, played between Újpest and Ferencváros.

== Teams ==
| Team | Previous finals appearances (bold indicates winners) |
|---|---|
| Újpest | 15 (1922, 1923, 1925, 1927, 1933, **1969**, **1970**, **1975**, **1982**, **1983**, **1987**, **1992**, 1998, **2002**, **2014**) |
| Ferencváros | 30 (1912, **1913**, **1922**, **1927**, **1928**, 1931, 1932, **1933**, **1935**, **1942**, **1943**, **1944**, **1958**, 1966, **1972**, **1974**, **1976**, 1977, **1978**, 1979, 1986, 1989, **1991**, **1993**, **1994**, **1995**, **2003**, **2004**, 2005, **2015**) |

== Route to the final ==
| Újpest | | | Round | Ferencváros |
|---|---|---|---|---|---|---|
| Opponent | Result | Legs | | Opponent | Result | Legs |
| Vértessomló (megye I) | 14–1 | 14–1 away | Round of 128 |
| Celldömölk (megye I) | 9–0 | 9–0 away | Round of 64 |
| Velence (megye I) | 2–1 | 2–1 away | Round of 32 | Nagyecsed (megye I) | 10–0 | 10–0 away |
| Zalaegerszegi TE (NBII) | 6–1 | 5–0 away; 1–1 home | Round of 16 | Csákvári TK (NBII) | 7–5 | 4–1 home; 3–4 away; |
| FC Tiszaújváros (NBIII) | 5–2 | 8–0 home; 2–1 away | Quarterfinals | Videoton FC (NBI) | 2–2 | 0–1 home; 1–2 away |
| Békéscsaba 1912 Előre (NBI) | 3–1 | 2–0 home; 1–1 away | Semifinals | Debreceni VSC (NBI) | 3–0 | 3–0 home; 0–0 away |

== Match ==
7 May 2016
(CEST) 20:30

| Újpest | 0–1 | Ferencváros |
|---|---|---|
| | | Gera 79' |

Groupama Aréna, Budapest (Ferencváros)
Attendance: 19,000
Referee: Zoltán Iványi

| **Újpest** | **Ferencváros** |

ÚJPEST:
| GK | 1 | (Hungary) Szabolcs Balajcza |
| RB | 3 | (Belgium) Jonathan Heris |
| B | 5 | (Hungary) Róbert Litauszki | (yellow card) 25' |
| B | 15 | (Hungary) Ákos Kecskés |
| LB | 8 | (Hungary) Balázs Balogh |
| MF | 18 | (Montenegro) Bojan Sanković |
| MF | 26 | (Hungary) Benjámin Cseke |
| MF | 7 | (Belgium) Kylian Hazard | (substituted off) 63' |
| MF | 29 | (North Macedonia) Enis Bardhi | (substituted off) 71' |
| LF | 19 | (Serbia) Nemanja Andrić | (substituted off) 63' |
| F | 9 | (Hungary) László Lencse |
Substitutes:
| GK | 32 | (Hungary) Zoltán Kovács |
| B | 4 | (Hungary) Dávid Kálnoki-Kis |
| MF | 6 | (Hungary) József Windecker |
| B | 13 | (Hungary) Dávid Mohl | (substituted in) 34' |
| F | 17 | (North Macedonia) Viktor Angelov |
| MF | 20 | (Mali) Souleymane Diarra | (substituted in) 73' (yellow card) 90+2' |
| F | 22 | (Hungary) Péter Kabát | (substituted in) 85' |
Manager:
(Serbia) Nebojša Vignjević

FERENCVÁROS:
| GK | 90 | (Hungary) Dénes Dibusz |
| RB | 66 | (Austria) Emir Dilaver |
| B | 27 | (Poland) Michał Nalepa | (substituted off) half-time' |
| B | 16 | (Hungary) Leandro de Almeida |
| LB | 77 | (Ecuador) Cristian Ramírez | (yellow card) 90' |
| MF | 20 | (Hungary) Zoltán Gera | 78' |
| MF | 17 | (Hungary) Ádám Pintér |
| MF | 15 | (Hungary) Tamás Hajnal |
| MF | 97 | (Hungary) Roland Varga | (substituted off) 88' |
| F | 13 | (Hungary) Dániel Böde |
| LF | 24 | (Belgium) Roland Lamah | (substituted off) 57' |
Substitutes:
| GK | 55 | (Hungary) Levente Jova |
| F | 10 | (Hungary) András Radó | (substituted in) half-time' |
| F | 11 | (Slovakia) Stanislav Šesták |
| MF | 14 | (Hungary) Dominik Nagy |
| MF | 19 | (Hungary) Gábor Gyömbér | (substituted in) 57' (yellow card) 57' |
| MF | 22 | (Hungary) Attila Busai |
| MF | 30 | (Serbia) Vladan Čukić | (substituted in) 88' |
Manager:
(Germany) Thomas Doll
