= List of Paksi FC managers =

Paksi FC is a professional football club based in Paks, Hungary.

== Managers ==
As of 30 July 2026.

Manager	Nationality	From	To	P	W	D	L	GF	GA	Win	Honours	Notes
Lajos Puskás	Hungary	5 January 1990	30 June 1990									
István Mihalecz	Hungary	1 January 1994	30 June 1995									
László Pusztai	Hungary	1 July 1995	30 June 1996									
István Reszeli Soós	Hungary	1 July 1996	31 May 1997									
Ferenc Haáz	Hungary	1 July 1999	30 June 2000									
Ferenc Lengyel	Hungary	1 July 2004	23 September 2007	39	12	8	19	47	58			
Imre Gellei	Hungary	25 September 2007	12 April 2010	73	20	25	28	96	114			
Károly Kis	Hungary	12 April 2010	1 August 2012	80	36	18	26	129	116			
Csaba Máté (caretaker)	Hungary	11 August 2012	30 August 2012	3	0	2	1	5	6			
Tomislav Sivić	Serbia	30 August 2012	1 June 2013	27	8	8	11	35	36			
Ferenc Horvath	Hungary	24 June 2013	9 January 2014	18	4	5	9	21	31			
Aurél Csertői	Hungary	9 January 2014	21 May 2019	188	69	54	65	255	234			
Tomislav Sivić	Serbia / Hungary	27 May 2019	3 November 2019	13	5	1	7	25	23			
Gábor Osztermájer	Hungary	5 November 2019	22 September 2020	32	12	9	11	46	45			
György Bognár	Hungary	22 September 2020	15 May 2022	71	33	14	24	175	128			
Róbert Waltner	Hungary	1 July 2022	13 February 2023	22	9	5	8	40	34			
György Bognár	Hungary	14 Feb 2023	present	144	77	29	38	286	210	53.47	2023–24 Magyar Kupa, 2024–25 Magyar Kupa	
