= Gábor Vas =

Hungarian footballer

Personal information
- Full name: Gábor Vas
- Date of birth: 29 August 2003 (age 23)
- Place of birth: Szekszárd, Hungary
- Position: Midfielder

Team information
- Current team: Paks
- Number: 12

Youth career
- 2008–2011: Tolna
- 2011–2020: Paks

Senior career*
Years	Team	Apps	(Gls)
2020–	Paks	83	(0)
2020–2022	→ Paks II	26	(2)

International career^{‡}
2021–2022	Hungary U-19	3	(0)
- * Club domestic league appearances and goals as of 30 May 2026 ‡ National team caps and goals as of 9 May 2023

Gábor Vas (born 29 August 2003) is a Hungarian football midfielder who plays for OTP Bank Liga club Paksi FC.

== Career ==
=== Paks ===
On 15 May 2024, he won the 2024 Magyar Kupa Final with Paks by beating Ferencváros 2–0 at the Puskás Aréna.

On 14 May 2025, he won the 2025 Magyar Kupa final with Paksi FC after beating Ferencvárosi TC 4–3 on penalty shoot-out.

== International career ==
On 27 August 2024, Marco Rossi invited him to play against Germany in the 2024–25 UEFA Nations League match due on 7 September 2024.

== Career statistics ==
As of match played 27 July 2025.

Appearances and goals by club, season and competition
Club	Season	League			Cup		Continental		Other		Total	
Club	Season	Division	Apps	Goals	Apps	Goals	Apps	Goals	Apps	Goals	Apps	Goals
Paks	2020–21	Nemzeti Bajnokság I	5	0	3	0	0	0	—		8	0
Paks	2021–22	Nemzeti Bajnokság I	7	0	1	0	—		—		8	0
Paks	2022–23	Nemzeti Bajnokság I	22	0	2	0	—		—		24	0
Paks	2023–24	Nemzeti Bajnokság I	18	0	4	0	—		—		22	0
Paks	2024–25	Nemzeti Bajnokság I	21	0	0	0	6 (Note: One appearance in UEFA Europa League, five appearances in UEFA Conference League)	0	—		27	0
Paks	2025–26	Nemzeti Bajnokság I	1	0	0	0	3 (Note: Two appearances in UEFA Europa League. one appearance in UEFA Conference League)	1	—		4	0
Paks	Total		74	0	10	0	9	0	0	0	93	0
Paks II (loan)	2020–21	Nemzeti Bajnokság III	26	2	0	0	—		—		26	2
Career total			100	2	10	0	9	0	0	0	119	2
