= Gergő Gyurkits =

Hungarian footballer (born 2002)

Personal information
- Date of birth: 5 June 2002 (age 24)
- Place of birth: Baja, Hungary
- Height: 1.84 m (6 ft 0 in)
- Position: Midfielder

Team information
- Current team: Paks
- Number: 18

Youth career
- 2007: Kinderball
- 2007–2016: Baja
- 2016–2018: Vasas
- 2018–2020: Paks

Senior career*
Years	Team	Apps	(Gls)
2020–	Paks II	87	(15)
2020–	Paks	53	(8)
2023–2024	→ Pécs (loan)	18	(1)
2024	→ Siófok (loan)	15	(1)
- * Club domestic league appearances and goals as of 30 May 2026

Gergő Gyurkits (born 5 June 2002) is a Hungarian professional footballer, who plays as a midfielder for Nemzeti Bajnokság I club Paks.

== Career ==
=== Paks ===
In the 2025 Magyar Kupa final in Budapest, Gyurkits was brought on as a substitute in the second half of extra time to replace János Szabó, and converted Paks's fourth attempt in the penalty shootout. Paks won the game 4–3 on penalties to give Gyurkits the first honour of his career.

== Career statistics ==
As of match played 5 October 2025

Appearances and goals by club, season and competition
Club	Season	League			Magyar Kupa		Europe		Total	
Club	Season	Division	Apps	Goals	Apps	Goals	Apps	Goals	Apps	Goals
Paks II	2020–21	Nemzeti Bajnokság III	30	2	—		—		30	2
Paks II	2021–22	Nemzeti Bajnokság III	28	3	—		—		28	3
Paks II	2022–23	Nemzeti Bajnokság III	10	3	—		—		10	3
Paks II	2024–25	Nemzeti Bajnokság III	18	7	—		—		18	7
Paks II	2025–26	Nemzeti Bajnokság III	1	0	—		—		1	0
Paks II	Total		87	15	—		—		87	15
Paks	2020–21	Nemzeti Bajnokság I	—		0	0	—		0	0
Paks	2021–22	Nemzeti Bajnokság I	3	1	3	0	—		6	1
Paks	2022–23	Nemzeti Bajnokság I	13	0	3	0	—		16	0
Paks	2024–25	Nemzeti Bajnokság I	10	1	4	1	0	0	14	2
Paks	2025–26	Nemzeti Bajnokság I	8	4	1	0	3 (Note: One appearance in UEFA Europa League, two appearances in UEFA Conference League)	0	12	4
Paks	Total		34	6	11	1	3	0	48	7
Pécs (loan)	2023–24	Nemzeti Bajnokság II	18	1	1	0	—		19	1
Siófok (loan)	2023–24	Nemzeti Bajnokság II	15	1	—		—		15	1
Career total			154	23	12	1	3	0	169	24

== Honours ==
Paks

- Magyar Kupa: 2024–25; runner-up: 2021–22
