= Paksi FC =

Association football club in Hungary

Paks
- Full name: Paksi Futball Club
- Nickname: Atomcsapat (Nuclearteam)
- Founded: 28 November 1952; 73 years ago
- Ground: Fehérvári úti Stadion
- Capacity: 6,150
- Chairman: János Süli
- Manager: György Bognár
- League: NB I
- 2025–26: NB I, 3rd of 12
- Website: http://paksifc.hu/
Home colours	Away colours

Paksi FC (Paks; Hungarian pronunciation: [ˈpɒkʃ]) is a Hungarian professional football club based in Paks. Since its founding in 1952, it has played at either a county or national level. In 2006, it ascended to the Nemzeti Bajnokság I, the top division in Hungarian football, for the first time. It plays its home games at Fehérvári úti Stadion. The team colors are green and white. In the 2010–11 Hungarian Division, the team finished second and qualified for the Europa League 2011–12 season. The club is known for its policy of signing only Hungarian players.

== History ==
=== Early years ===
Football first came to Paks in August 1912 with a team composed entirely of students. Soon thereafter the Paksi Atlétikai Sport Club was formed which played locally. In 1952, the Paksi Sportegyesület was formed and began competing at a county level in Tolna county. They would continue to compete in county level competitions from 1954 to 1964. In 1966, the team opened their new all grass playing field to a crowd of 500.

In 1970, the team won the county championship and ascended to NB III, in the central division. On July 25 of the same year, they hosted Ferencváros and although the team lost 7–2, it played before a crowd of 5,000. It would spend three more years in NB III before being relegated back to the county championship level.

1976 was the club's most impressive year in county play as it won the championship with an impressive goal difference of 119–21 and again returned to NB III, but this was not the end of its success. It would win the Szabadföld Kupa 4–2 at the Népstadion in Budapest, easily the team's greatest victory up to this point.

From 1981 to 1982, the team participated in the NB III Dráva group, but it was short-lived and team returned to county level play. In the 1983–84 season, however, they won the championship in convincing fashion and returned to NB III. Throughout the 1980s, the team would come close several times to breaking into NB II, often battling against the other team from Paks, ASE, but always fell a few pieces short.

In July 1993, the two teams, Paksi SE and ASE United, giving the young players of PSE opportunities to learn and grow by learning from the more experienced ASE side.

=== 2000s ===
Paks finished in the third place of the 2002–03 Nemzeti Bajnokság III season and were promoted to the second division (Nemzeti Bajnokság II). Although Ikarus-Maroshegy finished in the second position, they did not meet the requirements for the second division. Therefore, Paks were eligible to be promoted to the second division.

Paks spent three consecutive seasons in the second tier. In the 2003–04 Nemzeti Bajnokság II season, they finished in the third place. The following season (2004–05 Nemzeti Bajnokság II), Paks finished in the second position. Despite the second position, they were not promoted to the top tier. The breakthrough took place in the following season. Paks won the 2005–06 Nemzeti Bajnokság II season and were promoted to the top division (Nemzeti Bajnokság I).

In their first season (2006–07 Nemzeti Bajnokság I), Paks finished in the 11th position and were not relegated.

On 23 September 2007, Ferenc Lengyel was dismissed. On 25 September 2007, Imre Gellei was appointed as the coach of the club. In the 2007–08 Nemzeti Bajnokság I, Paks finished in the 11th position. The same result was achieved in the consecutive season (2008–09 Nemzeti Bajnokság I). In the 2009–10 Nemzeti Bajnokság I, Paks finished in the 14th position and avoided relegation. Paks were competing with Nyíregyháza Spartacus FC and Diósgyőri VTK to remain in the top flight. In order to avoid relegation, the management decided to make changes. On 12 April 2010, Gellei resigned and Károly Kis was appointed as the coach of the club.

=== 2010s ===
In the 2010–11 Hungarian Division the team finished second and qualified for the Europa League 2011–12. Paks played their first international match in the Europa League 2011–12 season in Andorra where they beat UE Santa Coloma 1–0. The only goal of the match came in the 14th minute when Gábor Vayer scored. At home, they debuted with a four-goal win in Videoton's stadium, the Sóstói Stadion. József Magasföldi scored twice, one in each half. Dániel Böde and Norbert Heffler also contributed to the result. In the second round Paks faced the Norwegian Tromsø at home in front of 1,800 spectators, again in the Sóstói Stadion, in Székesfehérvár. The first goal of the match was scored by Magnus Andersen, with an equaliser from Hungarian Gábor Vayer. The match finished 1–1. In the second leg in Norway at the Alfheim Stadion Tamás Kiss scored to give Paks the lead in the 59th minute. Two more goals by Dániel Böde and again Tamás Kiss on the night gave Paks a 4–1 aggregate win over Tromsø. In the third round Paks were drawn against Scottish club Hearts. In the first leg in Hungary, Paks took the lead in the 32nd minute with a stunning lobbed goal by István Sipeki. In stoppage time at the end of the first half, Finnish referee Mattias Gestranius awarded Hearts a soft penalty, which was scored by Jamie Hamill to equalise and end the scoring on the night at the Sóstói Stadion.

Paks were eliminated by Puskás Akadémia FC on 3–5 aggregate in the round of 16 of the 2018–19 Magyar Kupa season.

=== 2020s ===
On 14 February 2023, György Bognár was appointed as the head coach of the club. In the winter break of the 2023–24 Nemzeti Bajnokság I season Paks was on the top of the table. The spring brought a tough competition between Paks and Ferencvárosi TC. On the game week 18, Paks beat Puskás Akadémia FC 2–1 at home and on game week 19 Paks beat Mezőkövesdi SE away 1–0. On the last match day, Paks beat Kisvárda and finished second in the 2023–24 season.

Paks entered the third round of the 2023–24 Magyar Kupa season. On 16 September 2023, Paks eliminated BKV Előre SC 7–0. Paks beat Budapest Honvéd FC on penalties at the Bozsik Aréna on 2 November 2023. In the round of 16, Paks beat Újpest 2–1 after extra time at the Szusza Ferenc Stadion on 29 February 2024. The winning goal was scored by Norbert Könyves in the 110th minute. Paks beat Vasas 5–2 at the Illovszky Rudolf Stadion to reach the semi-finals on 3 April 2024. On 23 April 2024, Paks beat Kisvárda FC 2–1 at home and qualified for the final of the Magyar Kupa for the second time in the club's history. On 15 May 2024, Paks beat Ferencváros 2–0 in the 2024 Magyar Kupa Final and won the trophy for the first time in the club's history. Papp scored in the 98th minute, while Haraszti secored the victory in the 122nd minute.

On 11 July 2024, Paks were defeated (0–4) by the 2023–24 Cupa României winner CS Corvinul Hunedoara in the first round of the 2024–25 UEFA Europa League at home. On 18 July 2024, although Paks beat Corvinul 2–0 at the Sibiu Municipal Stadium, they lost 4–2 on aggregate, Paks were transferred to the second qualifying round of the 2024–25 UEFA Conference League. On 25 July 2024, Paks beat AEK Larnaca FC 3–0 at home. The goal scorers were Zsolt Haraszti, Barna Tóth, and Bence Ötvös. On 1 August 2024, Paks beat Larnaca 2–1 at the AEK Arena – Georgios Karapatakis in Larnaca, Cyprus. Haraszti and Tóth scored the goals in the 18th and 42nd minutes, respectively. Thus, Paks won on 5–0 aggregate. In the third qualifying round, Paks beat FK Mornar 3–0 at home on 7 August 2024. Dániel Böde scored the first goal in the 59th minute, followed by two late goals by Bálint Szabó and Barna Tóth. In the second leg, Paks drew with Mornar (2–2) on 13 August 2024 at the Gradski stadion in Nikšić, Montenegro. In the play-off round, Paks drew with FK Mladá Boleslav (2–2) at the Lokotrans Aréna in Mladá Boleslav, Czech Republic. Before the second tie, Mladá dismissed David Holoubek and appointed Andreas Brännström as their new coach. In an interview with Nemzeti Sport, Bognár said that it is not good for him because he can throw away that tactics he prepared for the match. In the second tie, Paks lost 3–0 to Mladá at Fehérvári úti Stadion on 29 August 2024. In an interview with Nemzeti Sport, Bognár said after the match that the clubs are much ahead of Paks at home and not to mention abroad (in Hungarian: "Jóval előttünk járnak klubok Magyarországon is, nemhogy külföldön").

In the 2024–25 Magyar Kupa season, Paks played their first match in the third round against Mezőörs on 9 October 2024. The match ended with a 3–0 away victory for Paks. In the fourth round, Paks beat Budapest Honvéd FC 5–1 at the Bozsik Aréna on 31 October 2024. In the round of 16, Paks beat Mezőkövesdi SE 3–0 at the Mezőkövesdi Városi Stadion on 26 February 2025. In the quarter-finals, Paks beat Kisvárda FC 1–0 at the Várkerti Stadion on 2 April 2025. In the semi-final, Paks beat Zalaegerszegi TE 2–1 at home. In the final, Paks drew (1-1) with Ferencvárosi TC at the Puskás Aréna in front of 55,000 spectators on 14 May 2025. The teams did not score any goals in the extra time; therefore, the match was decided on penalty shoot-out. Both Lenny Joseph and Aleksandar Pešić missed their penalty which resulted in the victory of Paks.

In the 2024–25 Nemzeti Bajnokság I, Paks were fighting for the gold medal with Ferencváros and Puskás Akadémia. However, Paks could not win the last key matches. On game week 28, they drew with Puskás Akadémia at home (2-2). On 26 April 2025, Paks lost to Győr at the ETO Park (2–0). On 4 May 2025, Paks beat Fehérvár at the Sóstói Stadion (2–0). On 10 May 2025, Paks lost to title-holders Ferencváros at home. The match ended with a 3–2 victory for Ferencváros. Hinora equalized the score in the 88th minute, but finally Joseph scored the winning goal for Ferencváros in the stoppage time. On 18 May 2025, Paks drew with Debrecen at the Nagyerdei Stadion (0-0). On the last game week, Paks drew with Kecskemét (1-1) at home. Finally, Paks finished in the third position and qualified for the UEFA Europa League.

In the first qualifying round of the 2025–26 UEFA Europa League, Paks drew with CFR Cluj at home (0-0). On 17 July 2025, Pakw were beaten by CFR Cluj 3–0 at the Dr. Constantin Rădulescu Stadium, in Kolozsvár, Romania. Therefore, Paks were transferred to the second round of the 2025–26 UEFA Conference League. On 24 July 2025, Paks beat NK Maribor 1–0 at home. The only goal was scored by Windecker in the 52nd minute. In the second leg, on 31 July 2025, Maribor drew with Pak (1-1) at the Ljudski vrt, Maribor, Slovenia. Although Thisampa took the lead in the 34th minute, Papp equalized the score in the 57th minute. György Bognár, manager of Paks, said after the match that "we beat a really great team". Maribor's coach, Tuğberk Tanrıvermiş, said that "First let me congratulate to Paks, they qualified for the next round by having no chance to score at all". In the third qualifying round, Paks were defeated 3–0 by FC Polissya Zhytomyr at the Futbal Tatran Arena in Prešov, Slovakia. After the match, Bognár acknowledged Polissyia's strength saying that a 3-0 difference is not an exaggeration. The 3–0 defeat left limited chances for Pask to qualify for the play-off round. On 10 August 2025, Paks beat Újpest FC at the Szusza Ferenc Stadion on game week 3 of the 2025–26 Nemzeti Bajnokság I season. Finally, Paks finished in the third place in the season and qualified for the 2026–27 UEFA Conference League.

Paks started the 2026-27 season with a 2–1 home defeat from Panathinaikos F.C. in the second round of the 2026–27 UEFA Conference League qualifying. After Gábor Vas's own goal, Argentine footballer Santino Andino scored for the Greek giant club. However, substitute Dániel Böde managed to decrease the lead of the Greek team in the 71st minute. After the match, Paks's goalkeeper, Ádám Kovácsik, said that we have to go to Greece and win.

== Stadium ==
The home of the club is the Fehérvári úti Stadion which is a multi-use stadium in Paks, Hungary. Its capacity is 5,001. In the Europa League 2011–12 season the club played their home ties in Székesfehérvár at the Sóstói Stadion.

== Colours, badge and nicknames ==
The colours of the club are green and white. This combination is one of the most popular in Hungary – many clubs use it, such as Ferencváros, Szombathelyi Haladás, and Győr. The nickname of the club is Atomcsapat (in English "Nuclear Team") which stems from the fact that the only nuclear power in Hungary is based in Paks.

== Honours ==
=== Leagues ===
- Nemzeti Bajnokság I
  - Runners-up (2): 2010–11, 2023–24
  - Third place (1): 2024–25
- Nemzeti Bajnokság II
  - Winners (1): 2005–06
- Nemzeti Bajnokság III (including Paksi ASE and Paksi FC II)
  - Winners (4): 1988–89, 1989–90, 1990–91, 2010–11
  - Third place (2): 1986–87, 1987–88

=== Cups ===
- Magyar Kupa
  - Winners (2): 2023–24, 2024–25
  - Runners-up (1): 2021–22
- Szabadföld Kupa
  - Winners (1): 1976
- Ligakupa
  - Winners (1): 2010–11
  - Runners-up (1): 2009–10

== Seasons ==
=== League positions ===
As of 12 July 2025

- In 1970–71 the fifth tier league called Reg.I.
- Between 1971–72 and 1973–74, 1997–98 and 2002–03 the fourth tier league called NB III.
- Between 1978–79 and 1982–83 the third-tier league called Regional League.
- In 2005–06 the second-tier league called NB I/B.

== Current squad ==
As of 29 August 2026
Injured player

Note: Flags indicate national team as defined under FIFA eligibility rules; some limited exceptions apply. Players may hold more than one non-FIFA nationality.

No.	Pos.	Nation	Player
1	GK	HUN	Ádám Kovácsik
2	DF	HUN	Ákos Kinyik
3	DF	HUN	Ákos Debreceni
4	MF	HUN	Andor Lapu
5	MF	HUN	Bálint Vécsei
6	DF	HUN	Milán Győrfi
7	FW	HUN	József Szalai
8	MF	HUN	Balázs Balogh
9	FW	HUN	János Hahn
10	FW	HUN	Zsolt Haraszti
11	DF	HUN	Hunor Kuzma
12	DF	HUN	Gábor Vas
13	FW	HUN	Dániel Böde
14	DF	HUN	Erik Silye
15	DF	HUN	Csaba Belényesi (on loan from (Hungary) MTK)
16	FW	HUN	Balázs Wiesner

No.	Pos.	Nation	Player
17	MF	HUN	Milán Pető
18	MF	HUN	Gergő Gyurkits
19	MF	HUN	Kevin Horváth
20	DF	HUN	Mario Simuț
21	MF	HUN	Kristóf Papp
22	MF	HUN	József Windecker (vice-captain)
23	MF	HUN	Csaba Máté
24	DF	HUN	Bence Lenzsér
25	GK	HUN	Gergő Rácz
26	DF	HUN	Milán Szekszárdi
27	FW	HUN	János Galambos
28	GK	HUN	Márk Gyetván
29	FW	HUN	Barna Tóth
30	DF	HUN	János Szabó (captain)
—	DF	HUN	Zsombor Bévárdi

=== Out on loan ===
Note: Flags indicate national team as defined under FIFA eligibility rules; some limited exceptions apply. Players may hold more than one non-FIFA nationality.

No. / Pos. / Nation / Player	No. / Pos. / Nation / Player

== Non-playing staff ==
=== Board of directors ===
Position	Name
Managing director	(Hungary) Judit Balog
President of the department	(Hungary) Péter Bognár
Managing director	(Hungary) Zsolt Haraszti
PR manager	(Hungary) Zoltán Zomborka
Technical director	(Hungary) József Kraszt
Manager assistant	(Hungary) Ferenc Benedeczki
Assistant	(Hungary) László Éger
Marketing manager	(Hungary) Gábor Elbert
Assistant	(Hungary) Gábor Vayer

=== Management ===
Position	Name
Head coach	(Hungary) György Bognár
Coach	(Hungary) Gergő Koppel
Masseur	(Hungary) Zsombor Németh
Masseur	(Hungary) Csaba Dávid
Club doctor	(Hungary) Gábor Istváncsics
Club doctor	(Hungary) Sándor Gyulés

== Paksi FC in European competition ==
Season	Competition	Round	Opponent	Home	Away	Aggregate
2011–12	UEFA Europa League	Q1	(Andorra) UE Santa Coloma	4–0	1–0	5–0
2011–12	UEFA Europa League	Q2	(Norway) Tromsø	1–1	3–0	4–1
2011–12	UEFA Europa League	Q3	(Scotland) Hearts	1–1	1–4	2–5
2024–25	UEFA Europa League	Q1	(Romania) Corvinul Hunedoara	0–4	2−0	2−4
2024–25	UEFA Conference League	Q2	(Cyprus) AEK Larnaca	3–0	2−0	5−0
2024–25	UEFA Conference League	Q3	(Montenegro) Mornar	3–0	2−2	5−2
2024–25	UEFA Conference League	PO	(Czech Republic) Mladá Boleslav	0−3	2−2	2−5
2025–26	UEFA Europa League	Q1	(Romania) CFR Cluj	0–0	0−3	0−3
2025–26	UEFA Conference League	Q2	(Slovenia) Maribor	1–0	1–1	2–1
2025–26	UEFA Conference League	Q3	(Ukraine) Polissya Zhytomyr	2–1	0–3	2–4
2026–27	UEFA Conference League	Q2	(Greece) Panathinaikos	1–2	2–2	3–4

== Record by country of opposition ==
- Correct as of 31 July 2025

Country	Pld	W	D	L	GF	GA	GD	Win%
Andorra	2	2	0	0	5	0	+5	100.00
Cyprus	2	2	0	0	5	0	+5	100.00
Czech Republic	2	0	1	1	2	5	−3	0.00
Montenegro	2	1	1	0	5	2	+3	50.00
Norway	2	1	1	0	4	1	+3	50.00
Romania	4	1	1	2	2	7	−5	25.00
Scotland	2	0	1	1	2	5	−3	0.00
Slovenia	2	1	1	0	2	1	+1	50.00
Ukraine	2	1	0	1	2	4	−2	50.00
Totals	20	9	6	5	28	25	+3	45.00

P – Played; W – Won; D – Drawn; L – Lost; GF – Goals for; GA – Goals against; GD – Goal difference;

== See also ==
- List of Paksi FC seasons
- List of Paksi FC managers
