= Ádám Kovácsik =

Hungarian footballer (born 1991)

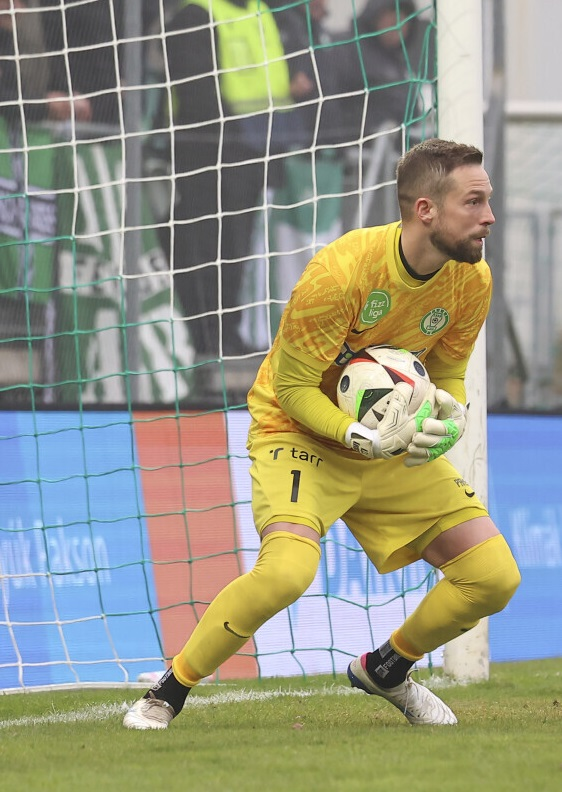
- Kovácsik playing for Paks in 2026

Personal information
- Full name: Ádám Gergely Kovácsik
- Date of birth: 4 April 1991 (age 35)
- Place of birth: Budapest, Hungary
- Height: 1.92 m (6 ft 4 in)
- Position: Goalkeeper

Team information
- Current team: Paks
- Number: 1

Youth career
- –2002: Budapest Honvéd
- 2002–2007: Ferencváros
- 2007–2010: Reggina

Senior career*
Years	Team	Apps	(Gls)
2010–2015	Reggina	40	(0)
2012	→ Foligno (loan)	11	(0)
2012–2013	→ Pavia (loan)	27	(0)
2013–2014	→ Carpi (loan)	18	(0)
2015–2023	Fehérvár	142	(0)
2022–2023	→ Győr (loan)	12	(0)
2023–2024	Mezőkövesd	10	(0)
2024–	Paks	36	(0)

International career
2007	Hungary U17	6	(0)
2009	Hungary U19	6	(0)
2017	Hungary	1	(0)
- * Club domestic league appearances and goals as of 30 May 2026

Ádám Gergely Kovácsik (pronounced [ˈaːdaːm ˈkovaːt͡ʃik]; born 4 April 1991) is a Hungarian professional footballer who plays as a goalkeeper for Nemzeti Bajnokság I club Paks.

== Club career ==
Kovácsik began his career as a youth player by Budapest Honvéd FC. He played first as a field player, however, yet at the age of seven stood between the sticks. In 2002, he moved to city rivals Ferencvárosi TC. In his second year by Ferencváros, Kovácsik won the Christmas Cup ahead of the youth sides of A.C. Milan and FC Barcelona. In 2006, he was member of the team that won the European final of the Nike Premier Cup, one of the most prestigious tournaments in the younger age categories. For his performances in that year, he was handed the Tibor Simon Award (Simon Tibor-díj), a prize named after former loyal Ferencváros defender Tibor Simon, which is given to individual who showed the most spirited display throughout the season.

In the following year Kovácsik signed to Reggina Calcio. Although he made his senior debut for the Southern Italian side on 30 May 2010 against U.C. AlbinoLeffe as a late substitute, Kovácsik remained only a reserve player until the departure of first choice keeper Christian Puggioni in the summer of 2011. Starting from the 2011–12 season Kovácsik got more playing minutes and produced some excellent performances, including saving two penalties in a 3–0 win over Brescia in October 2011.

In the 2012 winter transfer window, Reggina loaned him to Italian third-division-side Foligno.

In the next season, he was loaned to third-division-side team Pavia.

On 13 July 2013, it was officially announced that Kovácsik would play the season with Serie B side Carpi. He made his debut in Coppa Italia against his mother-club Reggina, at a 1–0 away loss. He played his first match in his new club, in the Serie B, against Ternana.

In the summer 2014, Kovacsik was back to Reggina on Lega Pro.

On 15 July 2022, Kovácsik was loaned to Győr.

On 23 July 2023, Kovácsik joined Mezőkövesd.

== International career ==
Kovácsik represented Hungary since his earliest time as a player. His best result on the international stage came at the 2009 FIFA U-20 World Cup, where he earned the bronze medal.

== Personal life ==
Kovácsik's rolemodel is Gianluigi Buffon. In a statement with his new club Mezőkövesd, he told that his way of playstyle is similar to Buffon.

In the same statement, he told that he is married, has a 5½-year-old child and a child who is expecting.

== Career statistics ==
=== Club ===
As of match played 23 May 2025

Appearances and goals by club, season and competition
Club	Season	League			Cup		Europe		Total	
Club	Season	Division	Apps	Goals	Apps	Goals	Apps	Goals	Apps	Goals
Reggina	2009–10	Serie B	1	0	0	0	—		1	0
Reggina	2010–11	Serie B	0	0	2	0	—		2	0
Reggina	2011–12	Serie B	11	0	1	0	—		12	0
Reggina	2014–15	Lega Pro Prima Divisione	28	0	1	0	—		29	0
Reggina	Total		40	0	4	0	—		44	0
Foligno (loan)	2011–12	Lega Pro Prima Divisione	11	0	0	0	—		11	0
Pavia (loan)	2012–13	Lega Pro Prima Divisione	27	0	0	0	—		27	0
Carpi (loan)	2013–14	Serie B	18	0	1	0	—		19	0
Fehérvár	2015–16	NB I	7	0	1	0	0	0	8	0
Fehérvár	2016–17	NB I	33	0	0	0	6	0	39	0
Fehérvár	2017–18	NB I	32	0	0	0	8	0	40	0
Fehérvár	2018–19	NB I	30	0	5	0	12	0	47	0
Fehérvár	2019–20	NB I	32	0	7	0	4	0	43	0
Fehérvár	2020–21	NB I	4	0	1	0	4	0	9	0
Fehérvár	2021–22	NB I	6	0	1	0	2	0	9	0
Fehérvár	Total		144	0	15	0	36	0	195	0
Győr (loan)	2022–23	NB I	12	0	1	0	—		13	0
Mezőkövesdi	2023–24	NB I	10	0	1	0	—		11	0
Paks	2024–25	NB I	11	0	3	0	—		14	0
Career total			273	0	25	0	36	0	334	0

=== International ===
As of match played 9 November 2017

Appearances and goals by national team and year
National team	Year	Apps	Goals
Hungary	2017	1	0
Hungary	2018	0	0
Hungary	2019	0	0
Hungary	2020	0	0
Total		1	0

== Honours ==
Videoton

- Nemzeti Bajnokság I: 2017–18
- Magyar Kupa: 2018–19

Paks

- Magyar Kupa: 2024–25

Hungary U20

- FIFA U-20 World Cup third place: 2009

Individual

- Tibor Simon Award: 2006
