= Ákos Kinyik =

Hungarian footballer (born 1993)

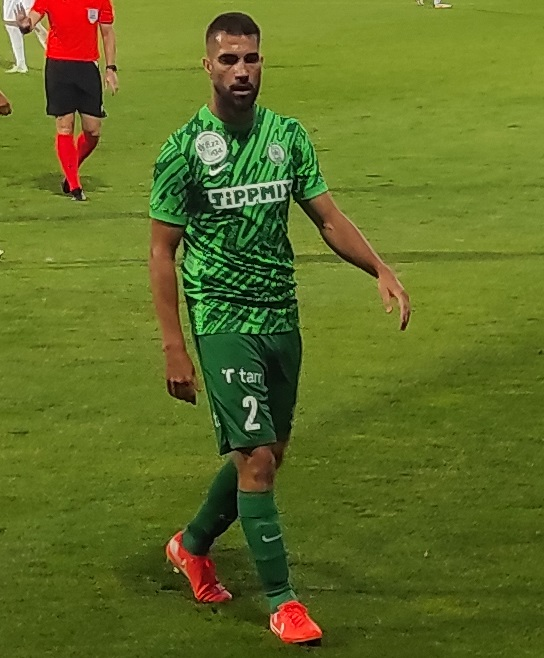
- Kinyik with Paks in 2025

Personal information
- Date of birth: 12 May 1993 (age 33)
- Place of birth: Debrecen, Hungary
- Height: 1.87 m (6 ft 2 in)
- Position: Defender

Team information
- Current team: Paks
- Number: 2

Youth career
- 2002–2012: Debrecen

Senior career*
Years	Team	Apps	(Gls)
2012–2021	Debrecen	113	(7)
2012–2014	→ Létavértes (loan)	42	(2)
2014	→ Debrecen II	48	(2)
2016–2017	→ Budaörs (loan)	35	(5)
2021–	Paks	118	(4)
- * Club domestic league appearances and goals as of 19 January 2026

Ákos Kinyik (born 12 May 1993) is a Hungarian professional footballer, who plays as a defender for Nemzeti Bajnokság I club Paks.

== Career ==
=== Debrecen ===
On 29 July 2017, Kinyik played his first match for Debrecen in a 1-1 drawn against Paks in the Hungarian League.

=== Paks ===
On 15 May 2024, he won the 2024 Magyar Kupa Final with Paks by beating Ferencváros 2–0 at the Puskás Aréna.

On 14 May 2025, he won the 2025 Magyar Kupa final with Paksi FC after beating Ferencvárosi TC 4–3 on penalty shoot-out.

== Career statistics ==
As of 9 August 2020

Appearances and goals by club, season and competition
Club	Season	League		Cup		League Cup		Europe		Total	
Club	Season	Apps	Goals	Apps	Goals	Apps	Goals	Apps	Goals	Apps	Goals
Létavértes
Létavértes	2012–13	19	0	6	0	–	–	–	–	25	0
Létavértes	2013–14	23	2	0	0	–	–	–	–	23	2
Létavértes	Total	42	2	6	0	0	0	0	0	48	2
Debrecen II
Debrecen II	2014–15	25	2	0	0	–	–	–	–	25	2
Debrecen II	2015–16	23	0	0	0	–	–	–	–	23	0
Debrecen II	Total	48	2	0	0	0	0	0	0	48	2
Budaörs
Budaörs	2016–17	35	5	1	0	–	–	–	–	36	5
Budaörs	Total	35	5	1	0	0	0	0	0	36	5
Debrecen
Debrecen	2014–15	0	0	0	0	3	0	0	0	3	0
Debrecen	2017–18	28	0	6	2	–	–	–	–	34	2
Debrecen	2018–19	27	2	7	0	–	–	–	–	34	2
Debrecen	2019–20	26	1	2	1	–	–	2	0	30	2
Debrecen	2020–21	2	0	0	0	–	–	–	–	2	0
Debrecen	Total	83	3	15	3	3	0	2	0	103	6
Career total		208	12	22	3	3	0	2	0	235	15
