= György Bognár =

Hungarian footballer and manager (born 1961)

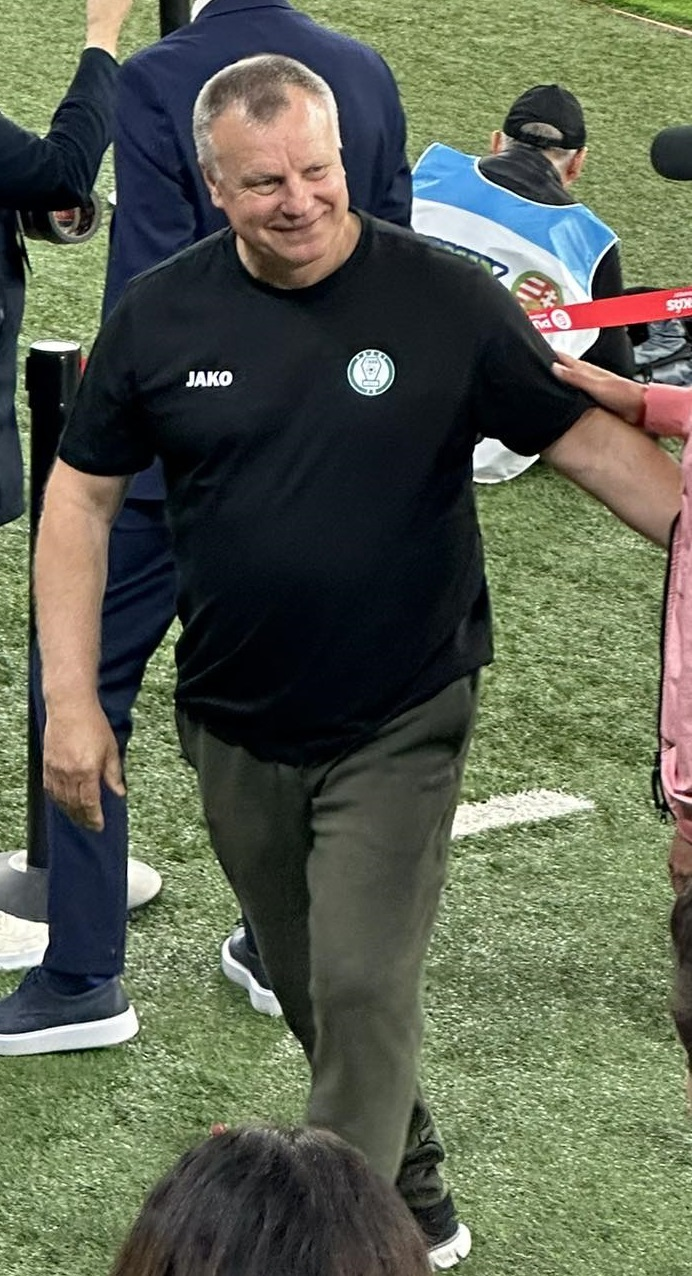
- Bognár with Paks in 2024

Personal information
- Date of birth: 5 November 1961 (age 65)
- Place of birth: Baja, Hungary
- Height: 1.92 m (6 ft 3 1/2 in)
- Position: Centre midfielder

Team information
- Current team: Paks (manager)

Youth career
- 1974–1979: Bajai SK

Senior career*
Years	Team	Apps	(Gls)
1979–1988	MTK Budapest	141	(16)
1988–1991	Toulon	61	(8)
1991	Standard Liège	18	(0)
1992–1996	BVSC	110	(38)
Total		330	(62)

International career
1985–1994	Hungary	50	(8)

Managerial career
- 1997–1998: BVSC
- 1998–2001: MTK Budapest (youth)
- 2001–2002: MTK Budapest
- 2002: Sopron
- 2004: Rákospalota
- 2004: Budapest Honvéd
- 2008: Felcsút
- 2008–2009: Puskás Akadémia (U-19)
- 2009: III. Kerület
- 2010–2012: Baja
- 2012–2014: Csákvár
- 2014–2016: Csákvár (director of football)
- 2016: Puskás Akadémia (director of football)
- 2016: Budaörs (director of football)
- 2017: Budaörs
- 2017–2020: Budaörs (director of football)
- 2020–2022: Paks
- 2022: MTK Budapest
- 2023–: Paks
- * Club domestic league appearances and goals

György Bognár (born 5 November 1961) is a Hungarian professional football manager and former player, who is currently the manager of Nemzeti Bajnokság I club Paks. He is considered as one of the most successful active football managers having won the Magyar Kupa in two consecutive years with Paks beating Ferencvárosi TC.

== International career ==
He made his debut for the Hungary national team in 1985, and got 50 caps and 8 goals until 1994. He was a participant at the 1986 FIFA World Cup in Mexico, where Hungary failed to progress from the group stage.

== Managerial career ==
=== MTK Budapest ===
On 16 May 2022, he was appointed as the sports director of MTK Budapest FC. On 23 October 2022, he was sacked.

=== Paks ===
On 14 February 2023, Bognár returned to Paks.

On 10 April 2024, he renewed his contract with Paks.

On 15 May 2024, he won the 2024 Magyar Kupa Final with Paks by beating Ferencváros 2–0 at the Puskás Aréna. In an interview, published in Nemzeti Sport, he said that the main aim of Paks would be to avoid relegation even if the club were really successful in the 2023-24 season.

In the 2023–24 Nemzeti Bajnokság I season Paks were competing with Ferencváros for the title, however, in the last couple of matches Paks could not keep up with the financially more stable Budapest-based club and, finally, Paks finished second.

On 7 May 2025, he renewed his contract with Paks. On 14 May 2025, he won the 2025 Magyar Kupa final with Paksi FC after beating Ferencvárosi TC 4–3 on penalty shoot-out. Before the match, Bognár said that the president of Ferencváros is a clown at a press conference. After the victory at the 2025 Magyar Kupa final, Bognár said that for the Hungarian football it is better if Ferencváros wins the Nemzeti Bajnokság I.

== Personal life ==
He is the father of István Bognár. In 2021 he and his son were transported to hospital due to COVID-19. He was married to Rita Tamás. In 2016, his ex-wife stood by him when Bognár received very negative comments on his behaviour in the Hungarian media.

== Controversies ==
Duting his spell in Sopron, he was reported to take out 10 million Hungarian Forints from the club's account and he spent the amount in casionos, hence his nickname ' kaszinós Gyuri' (in English: Casino Gyuri). However, no legal case was taken and his visits to local gambling services remains an urban legend.

In 2019, he said, as the manager of Budaörsi SC, that "it is a mistake to downgrade a second division match centrally" (in Hungarian: "egy felnőtt férfi NB II-es mérkőzést hiba központilag lebutítani"). He made a clear reference to the gender of the referee, Katalin Kulcsár.

During the UEFA Euro 2020, he was an expert on television. However, his insensitive comment caused outrage among tv spectators when Danish Christian Eriksen collapsed in a match against Finland. Shortly after the incident, he was banned from tv broadcasts. A couple of days later, he apologized for his comments.

== Honours ==
Individual

- Nemzeti Bajnokság I Head coach of the Month: September 2023, July–August 2025
