= József Windecker =

Hungarian footballer (born 1992)

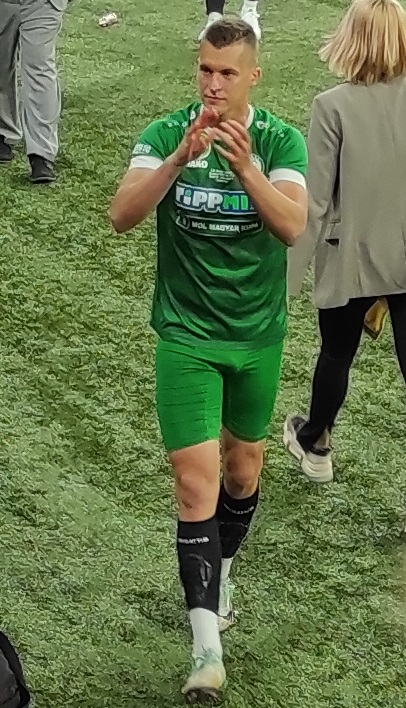
- Windecker with Paks in 2024

Personal information
- Date of birth: 2 December 1992 (age 33)
- Place of birth: Szeged, Hungary
- Height: 1.83 m (6 ft 0 in)
- Position: Midfielder

Team information
- Current team: Paks
- Number: 22

Youth career
- 2003–2005: Soltvadkert
- 2003–2005: → Kecskemét (loan)
- 2005–2007: Újpest
- 2007–2010: Győr

Senior career*
Years	Team	Apps	(Gls)
2010–2015	Győr	20	(0)
2012–2013	→ Siófok (loan)	21	(2)
2013–2014	→ Paks (loan)	22	(2)
2015–2018	Újpest	63	(6)
2018–2019	Levadiakos	0	(0)
2019–	Paks	174	(35)

International career
2011–2012	Hungary U19	4	(0)
2012	Hungary U20	2	(0)
2011–2015	Hungary U21	12	(1)
- * Club domestic league appearances and goals as of 30 May 2026

József Windecker (born 2 December 1992 in Szeged, Hungary) is a Hungarian football player, currently playing for Nemzeti Bajnokság I club Paks.

== Career ==
=== Paks ===
On 15 May 2024, he won the 2024 Magyar Kupa Final with Paks by beating Ferencváros 2–0 at the Puskás Aréna.

On 14 May 2025, he won the 2025 Magyar Kupa final with Paksi FC after beating Ferencvárosi TC 4–3 on penalty shoot-out.

== Career statistics ==
As of match played 21 December 2025

Appearances and goals by club, season and competition
Club	Season	League			Cup		League Cup		Europe		Total	
Club	Season	Division	Apps	Goals	Apps	Goals	Apps	Goals	Apps	Goals	Apps	Goals
Győr	2009–10	NB I	0	0	2	0	0	0	0	0	2	0
Győr	2010–11	NB I	1	0	2	0	1	0	0	0	4	0
Győr	2011–12	NB I	10	0	5	2	3	0	0	0	18	2
Győr	2014–15	NB I	21	1	3	0	3	0	2	0	29	1
Győr	Total		32	1	12	2	7	0	2	0	53	3
Siófok (loan)	2012–13	NB I	21	2	4	0	4	0	—		29	2
Paks (loan)	2013–14	NB I	22	2	1	0	1	0	—		24	2
Újpest	2015–16	NB I	12	1	2	0	—		—		14	1
Újpest	2016–17	NB I	33	3	5	1	—		—		38	4
Újpest	2017–18	NB I	18	2	1	0	—		—		19	2
Újpest	Total		63	6	8	1	—		—		71	7
Levadiakos	2018–19	Super League Greece	0	0	1	0	—		—		1	0
Paks	2018–19	NB I	12	0	1	0	—		—		13	0
Paks	2019–20	NB I	26	6	6	1	—		—		32	7
Paks	2020–21	NB I	8	1	1	0	—		—		9	1
Paks	2021–22	NB I	28	2	5	2	—		—		33	4
Paks	2022–23	NB I	23	6	3	0	—		—		26	6
Paks	2023–24	NB I	25	9	6	2	—		—		31	11
Paks	2024–25	NB I	25	6	5	0	—		7	1	37	7
Paks	2025–26	NB I	14	4	1	0	—		6	1	21	5
Paks	Total		161	34	28	5	—		13	2	202	41
Career total			299	45	54	8	12	0	15	2	370	55

== Honours ==
Újpest

- Magyar Kupa: 2017–18

Paks

- Magyar Kupa: 2023–24, 2024–25
