= Balázs Balogh (footballer, born 1990) =

Hungarian footballer

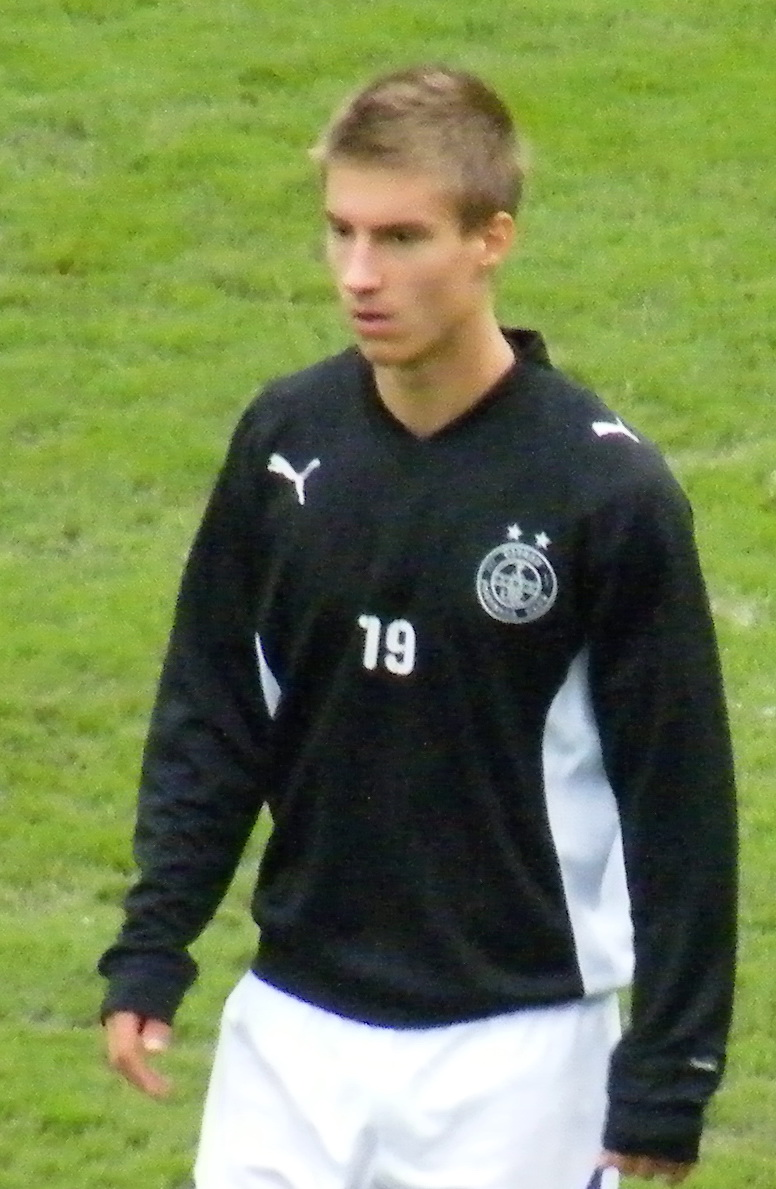
- Balogh playing for Újpest in 2010

Personal information
- Full name: Balázs Balogh
- Date of birth: June 11, 1990 (age 36)
- Place of birth: Budapest, Hungary
- Height: 1.81 m (5 ft 11 1/2 in)
- Position: Midfielder

Team information
- Current team: Paks
- Number: 8

Youth career
- 1996–2003: Goldball
- 2003–2007: Ferencváros
- 2007–2008: Empoli
- 2008–2010: Lecce

Senior career*
Years	Team	Apps	(Gls)
2010–2017	Újpest	186	(18)
2017–2019	Puskás Akadémia	44	(0)
2019–	Paks	156	(7)

International career^{‡}
2012–2013	Hungary U-21	1	(1)
2014–2017	Hungary	2	(0)
- * Club domestic league appearances and goals as of 30 May 2026 ‡ National team caps and goals as of 9 November 2017

Balázs Balogh (Hungarian pronunciation: [ˈbɒlaːʒ ˈbɒloɡ], born 11 June 1990) is a Hungarian footballer who currently plays as a midfielder for Paks.

== Career ==
=== Paks ===
On 15 May 2024, he won the 2024 Magyar Kupa Final with Paks by beating Ferencváros 2–0 at the Puskás Aréna.

On 14 May 2025, he won the 2025 Magyar Kupa final with Paksi FC after beating Ferencvárosi TC 4–3 on penalty shoot-out.

== Career statistics ==
Appearances and goals by club, season and competition
Club	Season	League			Cup		League Cup		Europe		Total	
Club	Season	Division	Apps	Goals	Apps	Goals	Apps	Goals	Apps	Goals	Apps	Goals
Újpest
Újpest	2010–11	Nemzeti Bajnokság I	17	3	2	0	2	0	0	0	21	3
Újpest	2011–12	Nemzeti Bajnokság I	25	3	5	1	4	2	0	0	34	6
Újpest	2012–13	Nemzeti Bajnokság I	29	1	1	0	0	0	0	0	30	1
Újpest	2013–14	Nemzeti Bajnokság I	30	1	8	2	5	0	0	0	43	3
Újpest	2014–15	Nemzeti Bajnokság I	29	2	6	1	4	0	—		39	3
Újpest	2015–16	Nemzeti Bajnokság I	30	4	8	4	—		—		38	8
Újpest	2016–17	Nemzeti Bajnokság I	26	4	6	2	—		—		32	6
Újpest	Total		186	18	36	10	15	2	0	0	237	30
Puskás Akadémia
Puskás Akadémia	2017–18	Nemzeti Bajnokság I	29	0	6	0	—		—		35	0
Puskás Akadémia	2018–19	Nemzeti Bajnokság I	15	0	4	0	—		—		19	0
Puskás Akadémia	Total		44	0	10	0	0	0	0	0	54	0
Paks
Paks	2019–20	Nemzeti Bajnokság I	30	1	3	2	—		—		33	3
Paks	2020–21	Nemzeti Bajnokság I	22	2	1	0	—		—		23	2
Paks	Total		52	3	4	2	0	0	0	0	56	5
Career total			282	21	50	12	15	2	0	0	347	35

Updated to games played as of 15 May 2021.

== Honours ==
Újpest

- Hungarian Cup (1): 2013–14
