= 1911–12 Magyar Kupa =

Tournament details
- Country: Hungary

Final positions
- Champions: MTK Budapest
- Runners-up: Ferencváros

The 1911–12 Magyar Kupa (English: Hungarian Cup) was the 3rd season of Hungary's annual knock-out cup football competition. MTK Budapest FC won because Ferencvárosi TC walked over.

== See also ==
- 1911–12 Nemzeti Bajnokság I
