= 1930–31 Magyar Kupa =

Tournament details
- Country: Hungary

Final positions
- Champions: III. Kerületi TVE
- Runners-up: Ferencváros FC

The 1930–31 Magyar Kupa (English: Hungarian Cup) was the 13th season of Hungary's annual knock-out cup football competition.

== Final ==
25 May 1931
17:30 (UTC+2)

III. Kerületi TVE	4–1	Ferencváros FC
Zilahi 4', 22', 75'; Győri 10'	Report	Steiner 58' (o.g.)

Üllői úti stadion, Budapest
Attendance: 3,000
Referee: Gusztáv Csárdás (Hungary)

== See also ==
- 1930–31 Nemzeti Bajnokság I
