= 2023–24 Paksi FC season =

Paks
2023–24 season
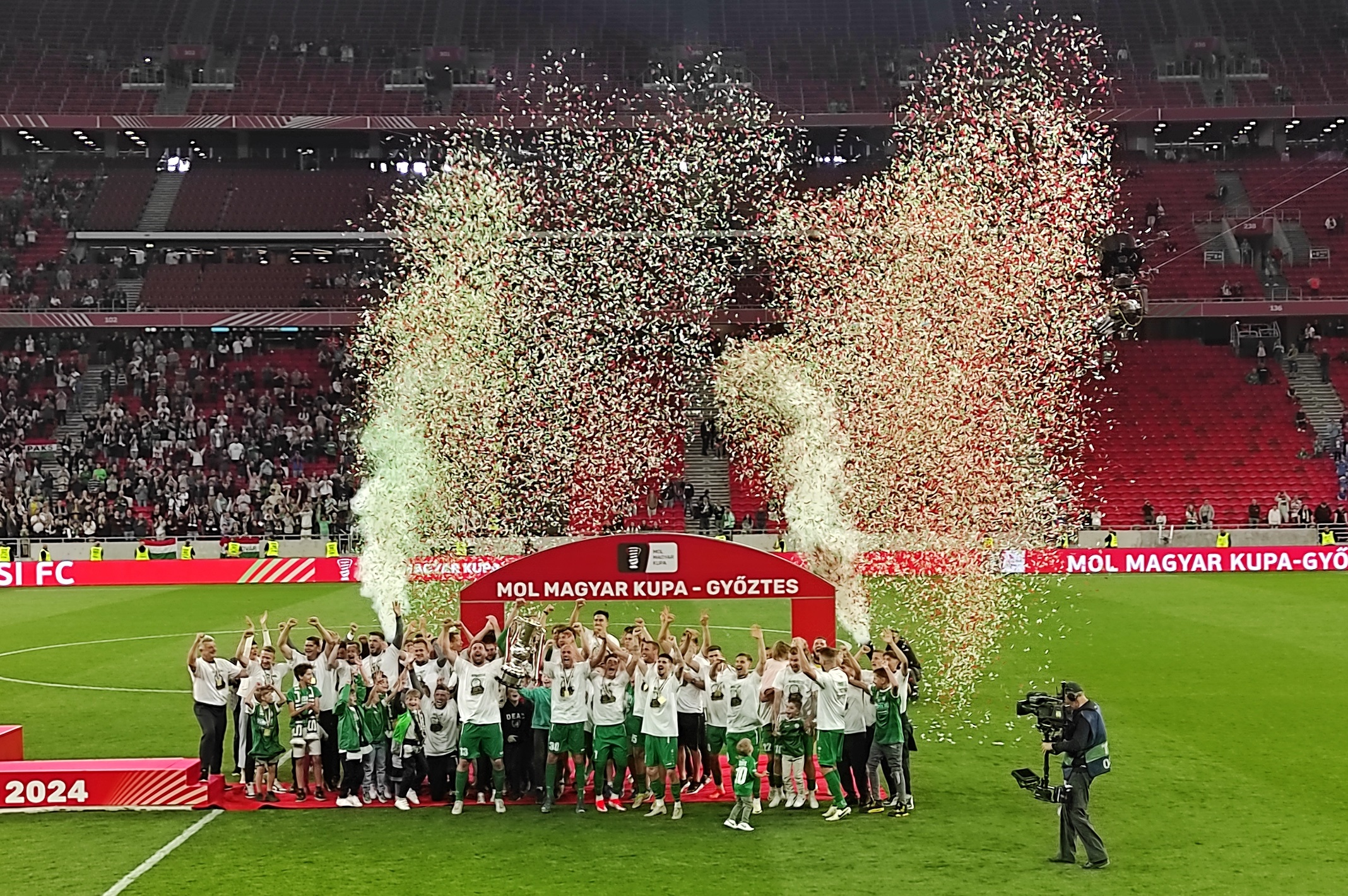
- Paks players celebrating their Magyar Kupa victory
- Chairman: Péter Bognár
- Manager: György Bognár
- Stadium: Fehérvári úti Stadion
- Nemzeti Bajnokság I: 2nd
- Magyar Kupa: Winners
- Top goalscorer: League: Norbert Könyves (11); All: Norbert Könyves (13)
- Highest home attendance: 4,201 v Ferencváros (10 December 2023, Nemzeti Bajnokság I)
- Lowest home attendance: 1,600 v Zalaegerszeg (16 February 2024, Nemzeti Bajnokság I)
- Average home league attendance: 2,512
- Biggest win: 7–0 v BKV Előre (Away, 16 September 2023, Magyar Kupa)
- Biggest defeat: 1–6 v Ferencváros (Away, 27 August 2023, Nemzeti Bajnokság I); 0–5 v Puskás Akadémia (Away, 20 April 2024, Nemzeti Bajnokság I)
Home colours	Away colours	Third colours

The 2023–24 season was Paksi Futball Club's 18th competitive season, 18th consecutive season in the Nemzeti Bajnokság I and 73rd season in existence as a football club. In addition to the domestic league, Paks participated in that season's editions of the Magyar Kupa.

Paks finished the first half of the season in first place in the Nemzeti Bajnokság I, but in the second half of the season the club's performance dropped and they lost five games in a row on one occasion, which meant that Ferencváros defended his title in the end. They got their revenge in the cup final, where they beat them 2–0 after extra time to win their first Magyar Kupa title and second silverware after winning the Ligakupa in 2010–11.

== Squad ==
Squad at end of season

Note: Flags indicate national team as defined under FIFA eligibility rules; some limited exceptions apply. Players may hold more than one non-FIFA nationality.

No.	Pos.	Nation	Player
1	GK	HUN	Péter Szappanos
2	DF	HUN	Ákos Kinyik
3	DF	HUN	Norbert Szélpál
5	MF	HUN	Bálint Vécsei
7	FW	HUN	Alen Skribek
8	MF	HUN	Balázs Balogh
9	FW	HUN	János Hahn
10	FW	HUN	Zsolt Haraszti
11	DF	HUN	Attila Osváth
12	MF	HUN	Gábor Vas
13	FW	HUN	Dániel Böde
14	DF	HUN	Erik Silye
15	DF	HUN	Zalán Debreceni
15	FW	HUN	Norbert Könyves

No.	Pos.	Nation	Player
16	FW	HUN	Zoltán Pesti
17	MF	HUN	Bence Kocsis
19	FW	HUN	Kevin Horváth
20	DF	HUN	Krisztián Kovács
21	MF	HUN	Kristóf Papp
22	MF	HUN	József Windecker
23	DF	HUN	Kristóf Lépő
24	DF	HUN	Bence Lenzsér
25	GK	HUN	Barnabás Simon
26	MF	HUN	Szabolcs Mezei
27	MF	HUN	Bálint Szabó
29	FW	HUN	Barna Tóth
30	DF	HUN	János Szabó
—	GK	HUN	Flórián Kovács

== Transfers ==
=== Transfers in ===
Transfer window	Pos.	No.	Player	From
Summer	GK	1	(Hungary) Péter Szappanos	Honvéd
Summer	DF	5	(Hungary) Attila Temesvári	Szeged
Summer	DF	6	(Hungary) János Hegedűs	Vasas
Summer	DF	14	(Hungary) Erik Silye	Vasas
Summer	FW	15	(Hungary) Norbert Könyves	Free agent (Note: Previous club Diósgyőr.)
Summer	DF	20	(Hungary) Krisztián Kovács	Free agent (Note: Previous club Győr.)
Summer	FW	23	(Hungary) Péter Beke	Budafok
Summer	MF	26	(Hungary) Szabolcs Mezei	MTK
Summer	FW	28	(Hungary) Dominik Földi	(Spain) La Cruz Villanovense
Winter	FW	29	(Hungary) Barna Tóth	Kecskemét

=== Transfers out ===
Transfer window	Pos.	No.	Player	To
Summer	GK	1	(Hungary) Gergely Nagy	(Greece) Lamia
Summer	DF	4	(Hungary) Márton Lorentz	Budafok
Summer	FW	7	(Hungary) Máté Sajbán	Zalaegerszeg
Summer	DF	14	(Hungary) Tamás Kádár	MTK
Summer	MF	19	(Hungary) Barna Kesztyűs	Nyíregyháza
Summer	DF	20	(Hungary) Nikolasz Kovács	Honvéd
Summer	FW	23	(Hungary) Barnabás Varga	Ferencváros
Summer	MF	27	(Hungary) Attila Haris	Szeged
Summer	GK	31	(Hungary) Gergő Rácz	MTK
Winter	DF	5	(Hungary) Attila Temesvári	Nyíregyháza
Winter	FW	17	(Hungary) Lukács Bőle	Mezőkövesd
Winter	FW	23	(Hungary) Péter Beke	Nyíregyháza

=== Loans in ===
Transfer window	Pos.	No.	Player	From	End date

=== Loans out ===
Transfer window	Pos.	No.	Player	To	End date
Summer	DF	5	(Hungary) Olivér Tamás	Nyíregyháza	End of season
Summer	MF	17	(Hungary) Bence Kocsis	Budafok	Middle of season
Summer	MF	18	(Hungary) Gergő Gyurkits	Pécs	Middle of season
Summer	MF	26	(Hungary) Patrik Nyári	Szeged	End of season
Summer	MF	28	(Hungary) Richárd Nagy	Siófok	Middle of season
Summer	GK	31	(Hungary) Vilmos Borsos	Budaörs	Middle of season
Summer	DF	32	(Hungary) Milán Szekszárdi	Kazincbarcika	End of season
Winter	DF	6	(Hungary) János Hegedűs	Siófok	End of season
Winter	MF	18	(Hungary) Gergő Gyurkits	Siófok	End of season
Winter	FW	28	(Hungary) Dominik Földi	Szeged	End of season
Winter	MF	28	(Hungary) Richárd Nagy	Szeged	End of season

== Competitions ==
=== Overview ===
Competition	First match	Last match	Starting round	Final position	Record							
Competition	First match	Last match	Starting round	Final position	Pld	W	D	L	GF	GA	GD	Win %
Nemzeti Bajnokság I	28 July 2023	18 May 2024	Matchday 1	2nd	33	17	7	9	51	42	+9	51.52
Magyar Kupa	16 September 2023	15 May 2024	Round of 64	Winners	6	5	1	0	20	6	+14	83.33
Total					39	22	8	9	71	48	+23	56.41

Source: Competitions

=== Nemzeti Bajnokság I ===
==== League table ====
Pos	Team	Pld	W	D	L	GF	GA	GD	Pts	Qualification or relegation
1	Ferencváros (C)	33	23	5	5	80	30	+50	74	Qualification for the Champions League second qualifying round
2	Paks	33	17	7	9	51	42	+9	58	Qualification for the Europa League first qualifying round (Note: Paks qualified for the Europa League first qualifying round by winning the 2023–24 Magyar Kupa. Since they qualified based on league position, the second Conference League second round spot was passed to the fourth-placed team.)
3	Puskás Akadémia	33	15	10	8	60	35	+25	55	Qualification for the Conference League second qualifying round
4	Fehérvár	33	16	6	11	55	40	+15	54	Qualification for the Conference League second qualifying round
5	Debrecen	33	14	6	13	49	48	+1	48	

Source: Hungarian Football Federation (in Hungarian), Soccerway
Rules for classification: 1) Points; 2) Matches won; 3) Goal difference; 4) Goals scored; 5) Head-to-head points; 6) Head-to-head goal difference; 7) Fair play ranking; 8) Drawing of lots.
(C) Champions

==== Results summary ====
Overall								Home						Away					
Pld	W	D	L	GF	GA	GD	Pts	W	D	L	GF	GA	GD	W	D	L	GF	GA	GD
33	17	7	9	51	42	+9	58	11	2	3	32	17	+15	6	5	6	19	25	−6

Source: Hungarian Football Federation

==== Results by round ====
Round	1	2	3	4	5	6	7	8	9	10	11	12	13	14	15	16	17	18	19	20	21	22	23	24	25	26	27	28	29	30	31	32	33
Ground	A	H	A	H	A	H	A	H	A	A	H	H	A	H	A	H	A	H	A	H	H	A	A	H	A	H	A	H	A	H	A	A	H
Result	D	W	D	W	L	W	W	W	D	W	W	D	L	W	W	W	L	W	W	W	L	W	W	D	L	L	L	L	L	W	D	D	W
Position	7	2	5	3	6	4	3	2	2	2	2	2	2	2	1	1	1	1	1	1	2	2	2	2	2	2	2	2	3	2	2	2	2
Points	1	4	5	8	8	11	14	17	18	21	24	25	25	28	31	34	34	37	40	43	43	46	49	50	50	50	50	50	50	53	54	55	58

Source: Matches
A = Away; H = Home; W = Win; D = Draw; L = Loss

==== Matches ====
28 July 2023 1	MTK	1–1	Paks	Budapest
20:00 CEST (UTC+2)	Kata (yellow card) 38'; Bobál (yellow card) 43'; Németh 49'; Hey (yellow card) 75'	Report	Papp (yellow card) 3'; Böde 65'; Bőle (yellow card) 69'; Vas (yellow card) 77'	Stadium: Hidegkuti Nándor Stadion; Attendance: 2,223; Referee: Ádám Farkas

12 August 2023 3	Diósgyőr	1–1	Paks	Miskolc
20:15 CEST (UTC+2)	Edomwonyi 15'; Holdampf (yellow card) 90+6'	Report	Könyves 29'; Temesvári (red card) 86'	Stadium: Diósgyőri Stadion; Attendance: 6,649; Referee: Tamás Bognár

19 August 2023 4	Paks	3–0	Újpest	Paks
20:00 CEST (UTC+2)	Ljujić 24' (o.g.); B. Szabó 25'; J. Szabó (red card) 40'; Kinyik (yellow card) 44'; Windecker (yellow card) 49'; Bőle 79'	Report	Hall (red card) 40'; Antzoulas (yellow card) 73'	Stadium: Fehérvári úti Stadion; Attendance: 3,076; Referee: József Erdős

27 August 2023 5	Ferencváros	6–1	Paks	Budapest
17:30 CEST (UTC+2)	Traoré 10'; B. Varga 19', 29', 44'; Mmaee 45+3'; Nguen 45+6'	Report	Kinyik (yellow card) 6'; Kovács 35'; B. Szabó (yellow card) 45+2'	Stadium: Groupama Aréna; Attendance: 7,657; Referee: Balázs Berke

2 September 2023 6	Paks	2–0	Fehérvár	Paks
19:30 CEST (UTC+2)	K. Kovács (yellow card) 8'; Windecker (yellow card) 38', (goal) 53'; Lenzsér (yellow card) 52'; Mezei 73'	Report	Christensen (yellow card) 44'; Serafimov (yellow card) 56'; Karamoko (yellow card) 69'	Stadium: Fehérvári úti Stadion; Attendance: 2,411; Referee: István Vad

23 September 2023 7	Puskás Akadémia	0–2	Paks	Felcsút
14:30 CEST (UTC+2)	Hornyák (manager) (yellow card) 59'; Gruber (yellow card) 68'; Szolnoki (yellow card) 82'; Plšek (yellow card) 89'; Corbu (yellow card) 90+4'; Golla (yellow card) 90+5'	Report	Haraszti 39' (pen.), (yellow card) 55'; Könyves 66'; Horváth (yellow card) 88'	Stadium: Pancho Aréna; Attendance: 1,510; Referee: Ádám Farkas

27 September 2023 2	Paks	2–0	Debrecen	Paks
17:45 CEST (UTC+2)	Windecker 14'; Kinyik (yellow card) 52'; Könyves 61'; Papp (yellow card) 69'	Report	Lagator (yellow card) 59'; Bárány (yellow card) 68'; Szécsi (yellow card) 77'	Stadium: Fehérvári úti Stadion; Attendance: 1,890; Referee: Tamás Bognár
Note: The match was originally scheduled for 6 August 2023, but was postponed due to Debrecen's participation in European competition.

30 September 2023 8	Paks	2–1	Mezőkövesd	Paks
14:30 CEST (UTC+2)	Kinyik (yellow card) 38'; Könyves (yellow card) 58'; Böde 62'; Windecker 84'	Report	Vayda 32'; Beriashvili (yellow card) 36'	Stadium: Fehérvári úti Stadion; Attendance: 1,834; Referee: Marcell Derdák

7 October 2023 9	Kecskemét	1–1	Paks	Kecskemét
20:30 CEST (UTC+2)	Tóth (yellow card) 24'; Szuhodovszki (yellow card) 56'; Pálinkás 75'; Májer (yellow card) 90+2'	Report	Szappanos (yellow card) 24'; Osváth (yellow card) 41', (goal) 69'; Papp (yellow card) 67'; Hahn (yellow card) 90+5'	Stadium: Széktói Stadion; Attendance: 3,785; Referee: Balázs Berke

21 October 2023 10	Zalaegerszeg	2–5	Paks	Zalaegerszeg
14:45 CEST (UTC+2)	Mance 44', 45+3' (pen.)	Report	Beke (yellow card) 7'; Windecker 32', 43'; Skribek 39'; Silye (yellow card) 45+2'; Hahn 50'; K. Kovács (yellow card) 56'; J. Szabó 59'; Papp (yellow card) 66'	Stadium: ZTE Arena; Attendance: 3,277; Referee: József Erdős

29 October 2023 11	Paks	3–1	Kisvárda	Paks
15:30 CET (UTC+1)	J. Szabó 16'; Windecker 48'; Mezei 80'; Lenzsér (yellow card) 90+4'	Report	Vida (yellow card) 2'; Melnyk (yellow card) 26'; Balogh 74'	Stadium: Fehérvári úti Stadion; Attendance: 2,078; Referee: Mihály Káprály

5 November 2023 12	Paks	0–0	MTK	Paks
18:30 CET (UTC+1)	Hahn (yellow card) 52'	Report	Kata (yellow card) 61'; Bognár (yellow card) 69'	Stadium: Fehérvári úti Stadion; Attendance: 1,824; Referee: István Vad

12 November 2023 13	Debrecen	1–0	Paks	Debrecen
18:30 CET (UTC+1)	Ferenczi (yellow card) 30'; Vajda 37'; Kusnyír (yellow card) 40'; Lončar (yellow card) 53'; Lagator (yellow card) 56'; Megyeri (yellow card) 90+5'	Report	Lenzsér (yellow card) 43'	Stadium: Nagyerdei Stadion; Attendance: 4,144; Referee: Márton Rúsz

24 November 2023 14	Paks	4–1	Diósgyőr	Paks
20:00 CET (UTC+1)	Könyves 10'; Mezei 21'; J. Szabó 27'; Szélpál (yellow card) 73'; Hahn 80'	Report	Szatmári (yellow card) 48'; Požeg Vancaš 54' (pen.); Vallejo (yellow card) 57'	Stadium: Fehérvári úti Stadion; Attendance: 1,712; Referee: Csaba Pintér

3 December 2023 15	Újpest	1–2	Paks	Budapest
12:45 CET (UTC+1)	Varga 24'; Mörschel (yellow card) 55'; Kastrati (yellow card) 78'; Tajti (yellow card) 90+1'	Report	Könyves 23' (pen.); Lenzsér (yellow card) 37'; Hahn 64'	Stadium: Szusza Ferenc Stadion; Attendance: 3,078; Referee: Balázs Berke

10 December 2023 16	Paks	3–2	Ferencváros	Paks
18:00 CET (UTC+1)	Papp 8'; Könyves 15'; Kovács (yellow card) 28'; Szélpál (yellow card) 38'; Kinyik (yellow card) 81'; B. Szabó 85' (pen.)	Report	Gojak (yellow card) 18'; Ćivić (yellow card) 25'; Leandro (assistant) (yellow card) 38'; Marquinhos 69'; Makreckis (red card) 78'; Ben Romdhane (yellow card) 79'; Stanković (manager) (yellow card) 80'; Lisztes 88'	Stadium: Fehérvári úti Stadion; Attendance: 4,201; Referee: Sándor Andó-Szabó

16 December 2023 17	Fehérvár	3–0	Paks	Székesfehérvár
12:30 CET (UTC+1)	Katona 1'; Kodro 19', 68', (yellow card) 59'; Christensen (yellow card) 45'	Report	Vas (yellow card) 30'; Mezei (yellow card) 57'; Beke (yellow card) 82'; K. Kovács (yellow card) 86'; Böde (yellow card) 90+4'	Stadium: Sóstói Stadion; Attendance: 4,078; Referee: Gergő Bogár

4 February 2024 18	Paks	2–1	Puskás Akadémia	Paks
17:30 CET (UTC+1)	Hahn (yellow card) 18'; Balogh (yellow card) 35'; Windecker 40'; Lenzsér 57'; Kovács (yellow card) 62'	Report	Komáromi 52'; Golla (yellow card) 56'	Stadium: Fehérvári úti Stadion; Attendance: 2,001; Referee: Balázs Berke

8 February 2024 19	Mezőkövesd	0–1	Paks	Mezőkövesd
16:00 CET (UTC+1)	Vayda (yellow card) 54'; Gomis (yellow card) 90+1'	Report	Osváth (yellow card) 41'; Szabó (yellow card) 43', (goal) 47'	Stadium: Városi Stadion; Attendance: 1,451; Referee: Sándor Andó-Szabó

11 February 2024 20	Paks	1–0	Kecskemét	Paks
12:30 CET (UTC+1)	Windecker (yellow card) 40', (goal) 64'; Szélpál (yellow card) 44'	Report	Szűcs (yellow card) 20'; Katona (yellow card) 34'; Vágó (yellow card) 40'; Kr. Horváth (yellow card) 48'; Varga (yellow card) 90+5'	Stadium: Fehérvári úti Stadion; Attendance: 2,310; Referee: Márton Rúsz

16 February 2024 21	Paks	3–4	Zalaegerszeg	Paks
20:00 CET (UTC+1)	Evangelou 4' (o.g.); Könyves 47', 55'; B. Szabó (yellow card) 78'; Hahn (yellow card) 79'	Report	Kiss (yellow card) 15'; Gruber 53'; Evangelou (yellow card) 61'; Croizet 66', 90+1'; Mance 73'; Mim (yellow card) 90+3'	Stadium: Fehérvári úti Stadion; Attendance: 1,600; Referee: Gergő Bogár

25 February 2024 22	Kisvárda	0–1	Paks	Kisvárda
15:00 CET (UTC+1)	Lippai (yellow card) 19'; Lucas (yellow card) 76'; Jovičić (yellow card) 87'; Melnyk (yellow card) 87'; Camaj (yellow card) 89'	Report	Könyves (yellow card) 23'; Mezei 33' (pen.); Szappanos (yellow card) 58'; Kinyik (yellow card) 76'	Stadium: Várkerti Stadion; Attendance: 1,910; Referee: Péter Antal

3 March 2024 23	MTK	0–2	Paks	Budapest
14:00 CET (UTC+1)	Hey (yellow card) 3'; Kata (yellow card) 56'	Report	J. Szabó (yellow card) 38'; Böde 72', 87'; B. Szabó (yellow card) 90+2'	Stadium: Hidegkuti Nándor Stadion; Attendance: 2,483; Referee: Mihály Káprály

10 March 2024 24	Paks	1–1	Debrecen	Paks
13:00 CET (UTC+1)	Tóth (yellow card) 11'; Osváth (yellow card) 44'; Papp 85'	Report	Dzsudzsák 3'; Domingues (yellow card) 20'; Lagator (yellow card) 28'; Vajda (yellow card) 36'	Stadium: Fehérvári úti Stadion; Attendance: 2,489; Referee: Tamás Bognár

16 March 2024 25	Diósgyőr	2–1	Paks	Miskolc
15:30 CET (UTC+1)	Jurek 19'; Klimovich 72'	Report	Könyves 2'; Lenzsér (yellow card) 18'; Papp (yellow card) 54'; Vas (yellow card) 66'	Stadium: Diósgyőri Stadion; Attendance: 5,587; Referee: József Erdős

31 March 2024 26	Paks	1–2	Újpest	Paks
15:30 CEST (UTC+2)	Könyves 47', (yellow card) 70'; Kovács (yellow card) 74'; Kinyik (yellow card) 77'	Report	Ljujić (yellow card) 38', (goal) 45+1', 75' (pen.); Mack (yellow card) 49'	Stadium: Fehérvári úti Stadion; Attendance: 4,108; Referee: Balázs Berke

7 April 2024 27	Ferencváros	1–0	Paks	Budapest
14:45 CEST (UTC+2)	Zachariassen (yellow card) 38'; Abu Fani (yellow card) 45'; Traoré 89', (yellow card) 89'	Report	Kovács (yellow card) 7'; Lenzsér (yellow card) 33'; Böde (yellow card) 45'; Windecker (yellow card) 45'	Stadium: Groupama Aréna; Attendance: 17,675; Referee: Ferenc Karakó

13 April 2024 28	Paks	1–2	Fehérvár	Paks
19:30 CEST (UTC+2)	Balogh 84'; Lenzsér (yellow card) 90+7'	Report	Karamoko 23', 54'; Csongvai (red card) 46'; B. Tóth (yellow card) 79'; Fiola (yellow card) 90+7'	Stadium: Fehérvári úti Stadion; Attendance: 3,511; Referee: Gergő Bogár

20 April 2024 29	Puskás Akadémia	5–0	Paks	Felcsút
14:30 CEST (UTC+2)	Nissilä 23'; Puljić (yellow card) 40', (goal) 60'; Nagy 73' (pen.); Ormonde-Ottewill (yellow card) 75'; Komáromi 80'; Colley (yellow card) 82'; Szolnoki 89'	Report	Kinyik (yellow card) 39'; Papp (yellow card) 41'; J. Szabó (yellow card) 59'; Osváth (yellow card) 71'	Stadium: Pancho Aréna; Attendance: 2,021; Referee: Csaba Pintér

27 April 2024 30	Paks	2–1	Mezőkövesd	Paks
14:30 CEST (UTC+2)	Könyves (yellow card) 8', (goal) 60'; J. Szabó 14'; Windecker (yellow card) 54'; Kinyik (yellow card) 89'; Tóth (yellow card) 90+5'	Report	Szalai 62'; Cseke (yellow card) 63'; Bőle (yellow card) 78'	Stadium: Fehérvári úti Stadion; Attendance: 2,034; Referee: Mihály Káprály

5 May 2024 31	Kecskemét	0–0	Paks	Kecskemét
16:00 CEST (UTC+2)	Vágó (yellow card) 49'	Report	Haraszti (red card) 6'; Hahn (yellow card) 33'	Stadium: Széktói Stadion; Attendance: 2,452; Referee: Márton Rúsz

11 May 2024 32	Zalaegerszeg	1–1	Paks	Zalaegerszeg
17:30 CEST (UTC+2)	Mim 25'; Evangelou (yellow card) 80'	Report	Windecker 49'; Vécsei (yellow card) 83'; Lenzsér (yellow card) 90+1'	Stadium: ZTE Arena; Attendance: 3,411; Referee: Mihály Káprály

18 May 2024 33	Paks	2–1	Kisvárda	Paks
17:45 CEST (UTC+2)	Mezei 34', (yellow card) 65'; B. Szabó (yellow card) 49'; Hahn 85'	Report	Melnyk (yellow card) 38'; Cipetić (yellow card) 72'; Matić (yellow card) 77'; Ilievski (yellow card) 82'; Spasić 90+1'	Stadium: Fehérvári úti Stadion; Attendance: 3,111; Referee: Sándor Andó-Szabó

=== Magyar Kupa ===
16 September 2023 Round of 64	BKV Előre	0–7	Paks	Budapest
15:00 CEST (UTC+2)		Report	Skribek (yellow card) 11', (goal) 63'; Beke 19', 47', 52'; Windecker 31'; Kovács 39'; Földi 71'; Osváth (yellow card) 84'	Stadium: Sport utcai Stadion; Attendance: 500; Referee: Róbert Nagy

2 November 2023 Round of 32	Honvéd	2–2 (a.e.t.) (4–5 p)	Paks	Budapest
19:30 CET (UTC+1)	Szappanos 22' (o.g.); Benczenleitner (yellow card) 26'; Kálnoki-Kis (yellow card) 91'; Bobál 95'; Tujvel (yellow card) 117'	Report	Könyves (yellow card) 19'; Mezei (yellow card) 71'; Hahn (yellow card) 88'; J. Szabó (yellow card) 95'; Bőle (yellow card) 105'; Szélpál (yellow card) 118'	Stadium: Bozsik Aréna; Attendance: 2,200; Referee: Ádám Pillók
	Penalties
	Bocskay (penalty scored); D. Kocsis (penalty scored); A. Szabó (penalty scored); Keresztes (penalty scored); G. Kocsis (penalty missed)		(penalty scored) Windecker; (penalty scored) Osváth; (penalty scored) Mezei; (penalty scored) Bőle; (penalty scored) Hahn

29 February 2024 Round of 16	Újpest	1–2 (a.e.t.)	Paks	Budapest
19:00 CET (UTC+1)	Ljujić (yellow card) 18'; Radošević 47'; Jevtoski (yellow card) 90'	Report	Skribek 21'; Mezei (yellow card) 69'; Lenzsér (yellow card) 93'; Könyves 110', (red card) 114'; Kinyik (yellow card) 120+3'	Stadium: Szusza Ferenc Stadion; Attendance: 2,389; Referee: Tamás Bognár

3 April 2024 Quarter-finals	Vasas	2–5 (a.e.t.)	Paks	Budapest
17:15 CEST (UTC+2)	Holender 59'; Szánthó (yellow card) 63'; Hinora (yellow card) 65'; M. Tóth 85' (pen.); Vida (yellow card) 113'	Report	Vas (yellow card) 24'; B. Tóth 44'; Skribek (yellow card) 46'; Kinyik (yellow card) 54'; Papp 90'; Böde 93'; Hahn 114'; Windecker 119'	Stadium: Illovszky Rudolf Stadion; Attendance: 2,004; Referee: István Vad

23 April 2024 Semi-finals	Paks	2–1	Kisvárda	Paks
20:00 CEST (UTC+2)	Papp 27'; Hahn 53'; Tóth (yellow card) 58'; Vécsei (yellow card) 70'	Report	Melnyk (yellow card) 8'; Matić 21'; Jovičić (yellow card) 55'; Mešanović (yellow card) 57'; Ötvös (yellow card) 64'; Lippai (yellow card) 87'; Feczkó (manager) (yellow card) 89'	Stadium: Fehérvári úti Stadion; Attendance: 1,798; Referee: József Erdős

15 May 2024 Final	Paks	2–0 (a.e.t.)	Ferencváros	Budapest
19:30 CEST (UTC+2)	Kinyik (yellow card) 16'; Vécsei (red card) 38'; Könyves (yellow card) 46'; Papp 98'; Osváth (yellow card) 114'; Szappanos (yellow card) 117'; Haraszti 120+2'	Report	Abena (red card) 75'; Botka (yellow card) 90+1'; Sevikyan (yellow card) 112'	Stadium: Puskás Aréna; Attendance: 51,900; Referee: Balázs Berke

== Statistics ==
=== Overall ===
Appearances (Apps) numbers are for appearances in competitive games only, including sub appearances.
Source: Competitions

No.	Player	Pos.	Nemzeti Bajnokság I				Magyar Kupa				Total			
No.	Player	Pos.	Apps	Goal	Booked	Sent off (straight red)	Apps	Goal	Booked	Sent off (straight red)	Apps	Goal	Booked	Sent off (straight red)
1	(Hungary) Péter Szappanos	GK	29		2		3		1		32		3	
2	(Hungary) Ákos Kinyik	DF	32		9		5		3		37		12	
3	(Hungary) Norbert Szélpál	DF	17		3		2		1		19		4	
5	(Hungary) Attila Temesvári	DF	2			1	2				4			1
5	(Hungary) Bálint Vécsei	MF	5		1		2		1	1	7		2	1
6	(Hungary) János Hegedűs	DF	1				1				2			
7	(Hungary) Alen Skribek	FW	12	1			3	2	2		15	3	2	
8	(Hungary) Balázs Balogh	MF	21	1	1		4				25	1	1	
9	(Hungary) János Hahn	FW	24	4	5		5	3			29	7	5	
10	(Hungary) Zsolt Haraszti	FW	22	1	1	1	5	1			27	2	1	1
11	(Hungary) Attila Osváth	DF	26	1	4		5		2		31	1	6	
12	(Hungary) Gábor Vas	MF	18		3		4		1		22		4	
13	(Hungary) Dániel Böde	FW	29	4	2		5	1			34	5	2	
14	(Hungary) Erik Silye	DF	20		1		4				24		1	
15	(Hungary) Norbert Könyves	FW	28	11	4		3	2	1	1	31	13	5	1
16	(Hungary) Zoltán Pesti	FW	2								2			
17	(Hungary) Lukács Bőle	FW	6	1	1		1		1		7	1	2	
17	(Hungary) Bence Kocsis	MF	3				2				5			
18	(Hungary) Gergő Jász	MF												
18	(Hungary) Patrik Szécsi	DF	1								1			
19	(Hungary) Kevin Horváth	FW	11		1						11		1	
20	(Hungary) Krisztián Kovács	DF	29	1	7		4	1			33	2	7	
21	(Hungary) Kristóf Papp	MF	32	2	6		5	3			37	5	6	
22	(Hungary) József Windecker	MF	25	9	5		6	2			31	11	5	
23	(Hungary) Péter Beke	FW	4		2		2	3			6	3	2	
23	(Hungary) Kristóf Lépő	DF												
24	(Hungary) Bence Lenzsér	DF	25	1	8		4		1		29	1	9	
25	(Hungary) Barnabás Simon	GK	7				3				10			
26	(Hungary) Szabolcs Mezei	MF	25	5	2		5		2		30	5	4	
27	(Hungary) Bálint Szabó	MF	23	3	5		4				27	3	5	
28	(Hungary) Dominik Földi	FW	2				1	1			3	1		
29	(Hungary) Barna Tóth	FW	10		2		2	1	1		12	1	3	
30	(Hungary) János Szabó	DF	24	4	2	1	3		1		27	4	3	1
31	(Hungary) Vilmos Borsos	GK												
33	(Hungary) Gábor Tóth	GK												
77	(Hungary) Zsolt Gévay	DF												
Own goals				2								2		
Totals				51	77	3		20	18	2		71	95	5

=== Hat-tricks ===
No.	Player	Against	Result	Date	Competition
23	(Hungary) Péter Beke	BKV Előre (A)	7–0	16 September 2023	Magyar Kupa

=== Clean sheets ===
			Clean sheets		
No.	Player	Games Played	Nemzeti Bajnokság I	Magyar Kupa	Total
1	(Hungary) Péter Szappanos	32	9	1	10
25	(Hungary) Barnabás Simon	10	3	1	4
31	(Hungary) Vilmos Borsos	0			0
33	(Hungary) Gábor Tóth	0			0
Totals			12	2	14
