= 2024–25 Paksi FC season =

Paks
2024–25 season
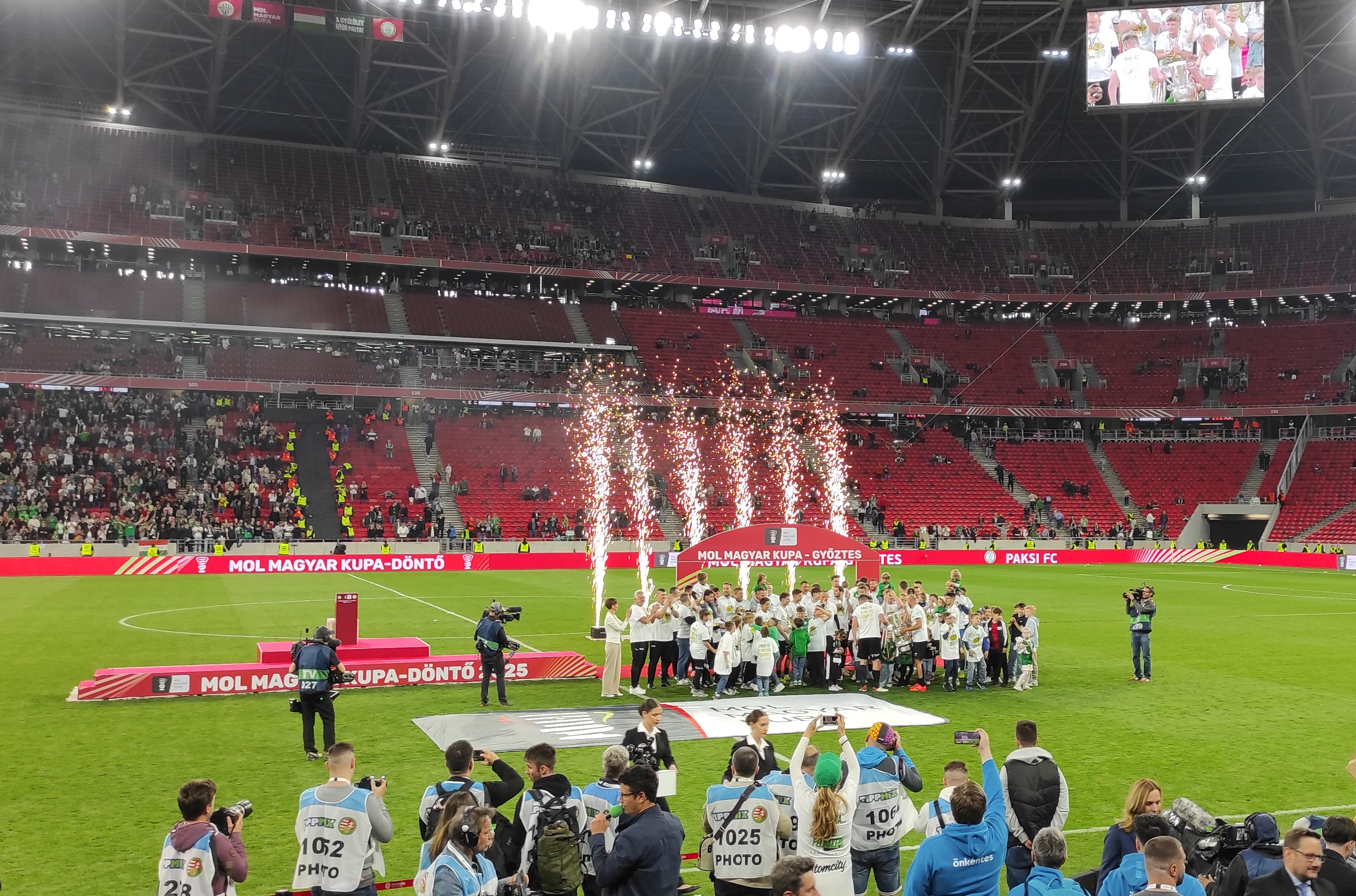
- Paks players celebrating their second in a row Magyar Kupa victory
- CEO: Zsolt Haraszti
- Manager: György Bognár
- Stadium: Fehérvári úti Stadion
- Nemzeti Bajnokság I: 3rd (bronze)
- Magyar Kupa: Winners (gold) (2nd title)
- UEFA Europa League: First qualifying round
- UEFA Conference League: Play-off round
- Top goalscorer: League: Dániel Böde (15); All: Dániel Böde (19)
- Highest home attendance: 4,500 v Ferencváros, 10 May 2025, NB I, R31
- Lowest home attendance: 1,601 v MTK, 7 December 2024, NB I, R16
- Average home league attendance: 3,041
- Biggest win: 5–0 v Debrecen (A), 19 October 2024, NB I, R10, 6–1 v Újpest (H), 14 March 2025, NB I, R24
- Biggest defeat: 0–4 v C. Hunedoara (H), 11 July 2024, EL, QR1
Home colours	Away colours	Third colours
- All statistics correct as of 23 May 2025.

The 2024–25 season is Paksi Futball Club's 72nd competitive season and the club's 11th consecutive season in the Nemzeti Bajnokság I. In addition to the domestic league, the team participates in the Magyar Kupa, the UEFA Europa League and the UEFA Conference League.

On 14 May, in the final of the Mol Hungarian Cup, Paks – just like last year – outclassed Ferencváros and defended their title. György Bognár's team led for half time, but Ferencváros saved the match for extra time. Several goals had already been scored, so a penalty shootout was decided, during which Péter Szappanos saved twice, then Bálint Vécsei took the final kick to close out the duel against his former team. Paks won its second cup victory.

== First team squad ==
As of 13 February 2025

Note: Flags indicate national team as defined under FIFA eligibility rules; some limited exceptions apply. Players may hold more than one non-FIFA nationality.

No.	Pos.	Nation	Player
1	GK	HUN	Ádám Kovácsik
25	GK	HUN	Péter Szappanos (on loan from (Saudi Arabia) Al Fateh)
31	GK	HUN	Márk Gyetván
2	DF	HUN	Ákos Kinyik
6	DF	HUN	Milán Győrfi
11	DF	HUN	Attila Osváth
12	DF	HUN	Gábor Vas
14	DF	HUN	Erik Silye
24	DF	HUN	Bence Lenzsér
30	DF	HUN	János Szabó (captain)
5	MF	HUN	Bálint Vécsei
8	MF	HUN	Balázs Balogh
18	MF	HUN	Gergő Gyurkits
19	MF	HUN	Kevin Horváth
21	MF	HUN	Kristóf Papp

No.	Pos.	Nation	Player
22	MF	HUN	József Windecker
23	MF	HUN	Bence Ötvös
26	MF	HUN	Szabolcs Mezei
28	MF	HUN	Kristóf Hinora
7	FW	HUN	Martin Ádám
9	FW	HUN	János Hahn
10	FW	HUN	Zsolt Haraszti
13	FW	HUN	Dániel Böde
15	FW	HUN	Norbert Könyves
16	FW	HUN	Zoltán Pesti
17	FW	HUN	Roland Varga
29	FW	HUN	Barna Tóth
—	FW	HUN	Ákos Szendrei
—	FW	HUN	János Galambos

== Transfers ==
=== In ===
Pos.	Player	Transferred from	Fee	Date	Source
FW	(Hungary) Bence Ötvös	(Hungary) Kisvárda		29 May 2024	
DF	(Hungary) Olivér Tamás	(Hungary) Nyíregyháza Spartacus	Loan return	30 June 2024	
DF	(Hungary) János Hegedűs	(Hungary) BFC Siófok	Loan return	30 June 2024	
MF	(Hungary) Dominik Földi	(Hungary) Szeged-Csanád Grosics Akadémia	Loan return	30 June 2024	
FW	(Hungary) Dávid Zimonyi	(Hungary) Vasas		23 July 2024	
FW	(Hungary) Martin Ádám	(Greece) Asteras Tripolis		18 December 2024	
FW	(Hungary) Norbert Könyves	(Hungary) Vasas		7 January 2025	
FW	(Hungary) Ákos Szendrei	(Slovakia) DAC 1904		14 January 2025	
GK	(Hungary) Péter Szappanos	(Saudi Arabia) Al Fateh	On loan from	31 January 2025	
GK	(Hungary) Márk Gyetván	(Hungary) Budapest Honvéd		5 February 2025	
MF	(Hungary) Kristóf Hinora	(Hungary) Vasas		13 February 2025	

=== Out ===
Pos.	Player	Transferred to	Fee	Date	Source
DF	(Hungary) Olivér Tamás	(Hungary) Nyíregyháza Spartacus	Undisclosed	1 July 2024	
FW	(Hungary) Norbert Könyves	(Hungary) Vasas	Undisclosed	23 July 2024	
GK	(Hungary) Péter Szappanos	(Saudi Arabia) Al-Fateh	Undisclosed	23 August 2024	
DF	(Hungary) Norbert Szélpál	TBD	Undisclosed	7 January 2025	
FW	(Hungary) Dávid Zimonyi	(Hungary) Vasas	Undisclosed	7 January 2025	
GK	(Hungary) Barnabás Simon	(Hungary) Diósgyőr	Loan	4 February 2025	
MF	(Hungary) Dominik Földi	(Hungary) Budapest Honvéd	Undisclosed	5 February 2025	
DF	(Hungary) Krisztián Kovács	(Hungary) Nyíregyháza	Loan	13 February 2025	

=== Out on loan ===
Note: Flags indicate national team as defined under FIFA eligibility rules; some limited exceptions apply. Players may hold more than one non-FIFA nationality.

No.	Pos.	Nation	Player
15	DF	HUN	Zalán Debreceni (at (Hungary) Kozármisleny until 30 June 2025)
17	MF	HUN	Bence Kocsis (at (Hungary) BVSC-Zugló until 30 June 2025)
23	DF	HUN	Kristóf Lépő (at (Hungary) Kozármisleny until 30 June 2025)
27	MF	HUN	Bálint Szabó (at (Hungary) Fehérvár until 30 June 2025)
7	FW	HUN	Alen Skribek (at (Hungary) Diósgyőr until 30 June 2025)
25	GK	HUN	Barnabás Simon (at (Hungary) Diósgyőr until 30 June 2025)
20	DF	HUN	Krisztián Kovács (at (Hungary) Nyíregyháza until 30 June 2025)

== Friendlies ==
=== Pre-season ===
22 June 2024 Friendly	Paks	4–1	Budaörs	Paks
10:00	Skribek 19'; Pesti 74'; Debreceni 88'; Hahn 90'	Report	B. Tóth 24'	Stadium: Paksi FC Stadion
Note: PAKS 1st half: Borsos — K. Kovács, Kinyik, Lenzsér, Silye — Ötvös, Mezei — Skribek, Horváth, Mohos — B. Tóth • PAKS 2nd half: Simon — Szekszárdi, Vas, Debreceni, Gyurkits — B. Kocsis, Vécsei — M. Nagy, Hahn, Földi — Pesti

27 June 2024 Friendly	Paks	0–0	(Serbia) Jedinstvo Ub	Telki
17:00		Report		Referee: Bence Csonka
Note: PAKS 1st half: Simon — Kinyik, J. Szabó, Ötvös — Osváth, Papp, Vécsei, Silye — B. Kocsis, Skribek — B. Tóth • PAKS 2nd half: Borsos — Vas, Debreceni, Lenzsér — K. Kovács, Windecker, Mezei, B. Balogh — Haraszti, B. Szabó — Böde

30 June 2024 Friendly	NK Radomlje (Slovenia)	Cancelled	Paks

30 June 2024 Friendly	Hebar Pazardzhik (Bulgaria)	1–6	Paks	Brežice, Slovenia
18:00	Krastev 82' (pen.)	Report	B. Szabó 12', 39', 44'; Böde 72', 90'; 80' (o.g.)	Stadium: Terme Catez Sportcentre

4 July 2024 Friendly	Bohemians 1905 (Czech Republic)	4–1	Paks	Šmarje pri Jelšah, Slovenia
17:30 UTC+2	Drchal 6'; Hrubý 11'; Ristovski 79'; Zeman 82'	Report	J. Szabó 55'	Stadium: Stadion Šmarje pri Jelšah

6 July 2024 Friendly	Austria Wien	1–3	Paks	Dietersdorf bei Fürstenfeld, Austria
15:30; 2x60 min.	Plavotić 57'	Report	Haraszti 38', 41'; Szekszárdi 91'	Stadium: Waldstadion
Note: PAKS 1st half: Szappanos — K. Kovács, Ötvös, Kinyik, Debreceni, B. Kocsis, Papp, B. Balogh, Haraszti, B. Szabó (Mezei (substituted on) 40'), Böde (Könyves (substituted on) 40') • PAKS 2nd half Szappanos — K. Kovács, Ötvös, Vas, Lenzsér, B. Kocsis, Papp, Vécsei, Skribek, Mezei, Könyves • PAKS from 80th min.: Simon — Osváth, Szekszárdi, Vas, Lenzsér, Silye, Horváth, Vécsei, Skribek, Mezei, B. Tóth

20 July 2024 Friendly	Paks	5–1	Kozármisleny	Paks
10:00	B. Tóth 18', 33', 35'; B. Szabó 53', 85'	Report	Kirchner 26'	Stadium: Training Centre Paks; Referee: Bence Csonka
Note: PAKS: Simon — Szekszárdi, Vas, Lenzsér, B. Szabó, Debreceni, Gyurkits, Balogh, Skribek, B. Kocsis, B. Tóth • substitutions: Földi, Horváth, Győrfi, Lapu

=== In-season ===
Winter friendly matches.

11 January 2025 Friendly	Paks	1–1	Budapesti VSC (NB II)	Paks
11:00	Ötvös 86'	Report	David 61'	Stadium: Training pitch Referee: Péter Antal
Note: 50 minutes each sessions; PAKS 1st half: Kovácsik (Borsos (substituted on) 33') — Győrfi, J. Szabó, Vas, Lenzsér, Gyurkits — B. Balogh, Horváth, Galambos, Könyves — Böde • Paks 2nd half: Borsos (Simon (substituted on) 66') — Silye, Ötvös, Kinyik, Vécsei, Osváth — Mezei, Windecker, R. Varga — Ádám, B. Tóth • Manager: György Bognár

16 January 2025 Friendly	LASK Linz (Austria)	2–3	Paks	Belek, Turkey
14:30	Entrup 73', 91'	Report	Könyves 24', 43'; R. Varga 28'
Note: Paks: B. Simon (Borsos (substituted on) 60') — Pupp (Mezei (substituted on) 81'), Kinyik, J. Szabó — Győrfi, B. Balogh, Silye (Gyurkits (substituted on) 47' (Vas (substituted on) 68')) — Horváth, R. Varga (Máté (substituted on) 46') — Könyves (Böde (substituted on) 60'), Galambos • Manager: György Bognár

17 January 2025 Friendly	Pogon Szczecin (Poland)	0–3	Paks	Belek, Turkey
15:00		Report	Gyurkits 42'; Ádám 48' (pen.); Ötvös 78' (pen.)
Note: Paks: Kovácsik — Osváth, Lenzsér, Vas, Vécsei, Gyurkits — Windecker, Ötvös, Mezei — B. Tóth (Böde (substituted on) 62'), Ádám (R. Varga (substituted on) 73') • Manager: György Bognár

21 January 2025 Friendly	Górnik Zabrze (Poland)	1–2	Paks	Belek, Turkey
	Bakış 62' (pen.)	Report	Könyves 35'; B. Tóth 76'
Note: Paks 1st half: B. Simon — Osváth, Ötvös, Kinyik, Vécsei, Gyurkits — Windecker, Horváth (B. Balogh (substituted on) 44'), Mezei — Ádám, Könyves • Paks 2nd half: Kovácsik — Győrfi, Vas, Kinyik (Ötvös (substituted on) 70'), J. Szabó, Máté — Mezei (Papp (substituted on) 62'), B. Balogh, Galambos — Böde, B. Tóth • Manager: György Bognár

24 January 2025 Friendly	Vejle (Denmark)	2–4	Paks	Belek, Turkey
12:45	Lauritsen (yellow card) 41'; Ngbakoto 62'; Velkov (yellow card) 109'; Barry 118'	Report	B. Tóth 17', 20'; Ádám (yellow card) 24' (goal) 56'; Kinyik (yellow card) 41'; Pupp (yellow card) 66'; B. Balogh 112'; Könyves (yellow card) 120'	Attendance: 50
Note: 60 minutes each sessions; Paks 1st half: B. Simon — Osváth, Vas, Kinyik, Vécsei, Silye — Windecker, Mezei, Ötvös — Ádám, B. Tóth • Paks 2nd half: Kovácsik — Osváth (Győrfi (substituted on) 78'), Pupp, Kinyik (Vas (substituted on) 90'), J. Szabó, Gyurkits — Mezei (Máté (substituted on) 78'), B. Balogh, Ötvös (Galambos (substituted on) 78') — Könyves, Ádám (Böde (substituted on) 78') • Manager: György Bognár

21 March 2025 Friendly	Paks	3–2	Kozármisleny	Paks
11:00	R. Varga 29'; B. Tóth 52'; G. Kocsis 70' (o.g.)	Report	Kócs-Washburn 15'; Átrok 68'	Stadium: Paksi FC Training center Referee: Péter Zierkelbach
Note: PAKS: Kovácsik — Hinora, Lenzsér, Kinyik, Vas (J. Szabó (substituted on) 46'), Silye — K. Horváth (Papp (substituted on) 29'), Mezei (Ötvös (substituted on) 46'), Haraszti — R. Varga, Böde (B. Tóth (substituted on) 46') • Manager: György Bognár

== Competitions ==
=== Overall record ===
In italics, we indicate the Last match and the Final position achieved in competition(s) that have not yet been completed.

Competition	First match	Last match	Starting round	Final position	Record							
Competition	First match	Last match	Starting round	Final position	Pld	W	D	L	GF	GA	GD	Win %
Nemzeti Bajnokság I	28 July 2024	23 May 2025	Matchday 1	3rd (bronze)	33	16	9	8	65	47	+18	48.48
Magyar Kupa	9 October 2024	14 May 2025	Round of 64	Winners (gold)	6	5	1	0	15	3	+12	83.33
UEFA Europa League	11 July 2024	18 July 2024	1st qualifying round	1st qualifying round	2	1	0	1	2	4	−2	50.00
UEFA Conference League	25 July 2024	29 August 2024	2nd qualifying round	Play-off round	6	3	2	1	12	7	+5	50.00
Total					47	25	12	10	94	61	+33	53.19

Last updated: 23 May 2025
Source: Soccerway

=== Nemzeti Bajnokság I ===
==== League table ====
Pos	Team	Pld	W	D	L	GF	GA	GD	Pts	Qualification or relegation
1	Ferencváros (C)	33	20	9	4	64	31	+33	69	Qualification for the Champions League second qualifying round
2	Puskás Akadémia	33	20	6	7	58	38	+20	66	Qualification for the Conference League second qualifying round
3	Paks	33	16	9	8	65	47	+18	57	Qualification for the Europa League first qualifying round (Note: Paks qualified for the Europa League as the 2024–25 Magyar Kupa winners. As a result, the second Conference League berth was passed to the team in 4th place.)
4	Győr	33	14	11	8	49	37	+12	53	Qualification for the Conference League second qualifying round
5	MTK	33	13	7	13	53	47	+6	46	

Source: Hungarian Football Federation (in Hungarian)
Rules for classification: 1) Points; 2) Matches won; 3) Goal difference; 4) Goals scored; 5) Head-to-head points; 6) Head-to-head goal difference; 7) Fair play ranking; 8) Drawing of lots.
(C) Champions

==== Results summary ====
Overall								Home						Away					
Pld	W	D	L	GF	GA	GD	Pts	W	D	L	GF	GA	GD	W	D	L	GF	GA	GD
33	16	9	8	65	47	+18	57	10	4	2	39	23	+16	6	5	6	26	24	+2

Last updated: 23 May 2025.
Source: Soccerway

==== Results by round ====
A = Away; H = Home; W = Win; D = Draw; L = Loss

Round	1	2	3	4	6	7	8	9	10	11	12	13	14	15	5^{1}	16	17	18	19	20	21	22	23	24	25	26	27	28	29	30	31	32	33
Ground	A	H	A	H	H	A	A	H	A	H	H	A	H	A	A	H	A	H	H	A	H	A	A	H	A	H	A	H	A	A	H	A	H
Result	D	W	L	W	W	L	W	W	W	W	L	D	D	L	L	W	L	D	W	W	W	D	W	W	D	W	W	D	L	W	L	D	D
Position	5	4	5	4	3	4	3	3	3	2	4	2	3	4	5	3	5	5	3	3	3	3	3	3	3	3	3	3	3	3	3	3	3
Points	1	4	4	7	10	10	13	16	19	22	22	23	24	24	24	27	27	28	31	34	37	38	41	44	45	48	51	52	52	55	55	56	57

Updated to match(es) played on 23 May 2025. Source:
Notes:
^{1} Round 5 match (MTK–Paks) has been postponed to 4 Dec 2024.

==== Matches ====
Win Draw Loss Postponed

28 July 2024 1	Diósgyőr	2–2	Paks	Miskolc
18:50 CEST	Rakonjac 40'; Á. Bényei (yellow card) 48'; Edomwonyi (yellow card) 77' (goal) 86'; Saničanin (yellow card) 90+2'	Report	K. Kovács (yellow card) 36'; Böde 47'; Windecker 81' (pen.)	Stadium: Diósgyőri Stadion; Attendance: 6,137; Referee: Balázs Berke; Assistant referees: P. Garai, J. Aradi
Note: PAKS: Simon — Ötvös, Kinyik, Vas — K. Kovács, B. Balogh, K. Papp (c) (Windecker (substituted on) 46'), Mezei (Vécsei (substituted on) 69'), Osváth — B. Szabó (Zimonyi (substituted on) 63'), B. Tóth (Böde (substituted on) 46') • Coach: György Bognár

4 August 2024 2	Paks	2–1	Újpest	Paks
18:50 CEST	K. Kovács (yellow card) 24'; Kinyik (yellow card) 31'; Nunes 36' (o.g.); Mezei (yellow card) 44'; Windecker 90+2'	Report	Gergényi (yellow card) 35'; Ljujić (yellow card) 65' (goal) 81'	Stadium: Fehérvári úti Stadion; Attendance: 3,765; Referee: Ferenc Karakó; Assistant referees: I. Albert, B. Belicza
Note: PAKS: Szappanos — Ötvös, Kinyik, Silye (Ke. Horváth (substituted on) 85') – K. Kovács, Mezei (Vécsei (substituted on) 75'), K. Papp (Windecker (substituted on) 61'), B. Balogh (c), Lenzsér – B. Tóth (Böde (substituted on) 61'), B. Szabó (Zimonyi (substituted on) 75') • Coach: György Bognár

10 August 2024 3	Zalaegerszeg	3–1	Paks	Zalaegerszeg
19:45 CEST	Bakti 21' (yellow card) 50'; Mim 63'; D. Németh 69'	Report	Gyurkits (yellow card) 51'; Haraszti (yellow card) 77'; Kinyik (yellow card) 81'; Ötvös 83'	Stadium: ZTE Arena; Attendance: 2,379; Referee: Csaba Pintér; Assistant referees: V. Tóth II, I. Szécsényi
Note: PAKS: B. Simon — Vas, Kinyik, Lenzsér — K. Kovács, B. Balogh (c), Vécsei (Windecker (substituted on) 46'), Gyurkits (Haraszti (substituted on) 56'), Silye (Ötvös (substituted on) 75') — B. Tóth (Böde (substituted on) 56'), Zimonyi (B. Szabó (substituted on) 46') • Coach: György Bognár

18 August 2024 4	Paks	2–1	Nyíregyháza	Paks
17:45 CEST	Kinyik 5'; Silye 44'	Report	Kesztyűs (yellow card) 2'; Tamás 16'; Navrátil (yellow card) 63'; Eppel (yellow card) 90+5'	Stadium: Fehérvári úti Stadion; Attendance: 2,219; Referee: Péter Zierkelbach; Assistant referees: Gergely Becséri, Dávid Rózsa
Note: PAKS: Szappanos — Ötvös, Kinyik, Vas — Osváth, K. Papp, B. Balogh (Mezei (substituted on) 74'), Silye (K. Kovács (substituted on) 90') — Haraszti (c) (Windecker (substituted on) 46'), B. Szabó (Böde (substituted on) 64') — B. Tóth (Zimonyi (substituted on) 46' • Coach: György Bognár

1 September 2024 6	Paks	2–1	Puskás Akadémia	Paks
17:30 CEST	Zimonyi (yellow card) 28'; K. Kovács (yellow card) 36'; Windecker 57' (pen.), 60'	Report	Komáromi 15'; Nissila (yellow card) 46'	Stadium: Fehérvári úti Stadion; Attendance: 1,877; Referee: Csaba Pintér; Assistant referees: Norbert Bornemissza, Péter Ország
Note: PAKS: B. Simon — K. Kovács (Osváth (substituted on) 46'), Vas, Kinyik, Lenzsér, Silye (Ötvös (substituted on) 90+2') — Windecker (c), B. Balogh — K. Papp (Vécsei (substituted on) 85'), Ke. Horváth (Böde (substituted on) 46') — Zimonyi (Haraszti (substituted on) 74') • Coach: György Bognár

22 September 2024 7	Győr	2–1	Paks	Győr
19:00 CEST	Benbouali 9', 27'; Gavrić (yellow card) 13'; Diarra (yellow card) 82'; Gyurákovics (yellow card) 90+1'	Report	Ötvös 30'; Windecker (yellow card) 53'; Kinyik (yellow card) 77'	Stadium: ETO Park; Attendance: 3,158; Referee: Márton Rúsz; Assistant referees: Balázs Szalai, Róbert Horváth
Note: PAKS: B. Simon — Ötvös (Lenzsér (substituted on) 72'), Kinyik, J. Szabó (c) — Osváth, Windecker, K. Papp, Mezei (Földi (substituted on) 82'), K. Kovács (Silye (substituted on) 46') — Zimonyi (Böde (substituted on) 46'), B. Tóth (B. Balogh (substituted on) 64') • Coach: György Bognár

29 September 2024 8	Fehérvár	1–2	Paks	Székesfehérvár
15:30 CEST	Miličević (yellow card) 41'; Holender 45' (yellow card) 71'; Larsen (yellow card) 18' (yellow-red card) 78'; Kalmár (yellow card) 84' (On the bench)	Report	Ötvös (yellow card) 38' (goal) 75' (pen.); Győrfi (yellow card) 65'; Kinyik (yellow card) 83'; Windecker 90+6'	Stadium: Sóstói Stadion; Attendance: 5,321; Referee: Ferenc Karakó; Assistant referees: Balázs Buzás, Norbert Bornemissza
Note: PAKS: B. Simon — Győrfi, Vas (Silye (substituted on) 46'), Kinyik, Ötvös, J. Szabó (c) — K. Papp, Vécsei (Zimonyi (substituted on) 67'), Mezei (R. Varga (substituted on) 87') — Haraszti (Windecker (substituted on) 46'), B. Tóth (Böde (substituted on) 67') • Coach: György Bognár

6 October 2024 9	Paks	3–1	Ferencváros	Paks
18:00 CEST	Osváth 2' (yellow card) 79'; Böde 35'; Windecker (yellow card) 54'; B. Tóth 69'	Report	Szalai (yellow card) 61'; Kady 62'; B. Varga (yellow card) 72'	Stadium: Fehérvári úti Stadion; Attendance: 4,388; Referee: Balázs Berke; Assistant referees: Georgiou Theodoros, Péter Ország
Note: PAKS: Kovácsik — Osváth, Ötvös, Kinyik, Lenzsér, Silye (Vas (substituted on) 87') — Mezei (R. Varga (substituted on) 66') Vécsei — Windecker, Böde (B. Tóth (substituted on) 66'), K. Papp • Coach: György Bognár; Player of the match: Attila Osváth, Paks 8.3 (Source:)

19 October 2024 10	Debrecen	0–5	Paks	Debrecen
15:00 CEST	Domingues (yellow card) 38'; Lagator (yellow card) 73'; G. Kocsis (red card) 75'	Report	Vécsei 9'; B. Tóth 32'; Mezei (yellow card) 40' (goal) 41'; Silye (yellow card) 53'; K. Papp 65'; Ötvös 77' (pen.); Győrfi (yellow card) 86'; Kinyik (yellow card) 87'	Stadium: Nagyerdei Stadion; Attendance: 4,664; Referee: József Erdős; Assistant referees: Gergely Becséri, József Aradi
Note: PAKS: Kovácsik — Osváth, Ötvös, Kinyik, J. Szabó (c), Silye (Győrfi (substituted on) 77') — Mezei (R. Varga (substituted on) 66') Windecker (Ke. Horváth (substituted on) 77'), Vécsei, K. Papp (Gyurkits (substituted on) 88') — B. Tóth (Böde (substituted on) 66') • Coach: György Bognár; Player of the match: Bálint Vécsei, Paks 8.9 (Source:)

27 October 2024 11	Paks	1–0	Kecskemét	Paks
15:15 CEST	Ötvös 50' (pen.)	Report	K. Nagy (yellow card) 34'; Meskhi (yellow card) 45'; Vágó (yellow card) 90+3'; Be. Varga (yellow card) 90+5'	Stadium: Fehérvári úti Stadion; Attendance: 3,005; Referee: Marcell Derdák; Assistant referees: István Albert, Bence Belicza
Note: PAKS: Kovácsik — Osváth, Ötvös, Vas, J. Szabó (c), Silye (Győrfi (substituted on) 83') — Windecker, K. Papp, Vécsei, Mezei (R. Varga (substituted on) 67') — B. Tóth (Böde (substituted on) 67') • Coach: György Bognár; Player of the match: Kristóf Papp, Paks 7.9 (Source:)

3 November 2024 12	Paks	3–4	Diósgyőr	Paks
12:30 CET	Böde (yellow card) 6' (goal) 22', 43'; Mezei (yellow card) 80'; B. Tóth 85'	Report	Acolatse 5'; Edomwonyi 30' (yellow card) 49'; Jurek 37'; Saničanin 73'; Rharsalla (yellow card) 90+2'	Stadium: Fehérvári úti Stadion; Attendance: 2,501; Referee: Balázs Berke; Assistant referees: Vencel Tóth II, Gergely Becséri
Note: PAKS: Kovácsik — Osváth, Ötvös, Silye (Győrfi (substituted on) 60'), J. Szabó (B. Tóth (substituted on) 69'), Kinyik – Mezei, Vécsei, K. Papp, Windecker (Zimonyi (substituted on) 82') – Böde (c) • Coach: György Bognár; Player of the match: Dániel Böde, Paks 8.8 (Source:)

9 November 2024 13	Újpest	0–0	Paks	Budapest
18:30 CET	Má. Mucsányi (yellow card) 15'	Report		Stadium: Szusza Ferenc Stadion; Attendance: 5,241; Referee: Csaba Pintér; Assistant referees: Balázs Buzás, Péter Kóbor
Note: PAKS: Kovácsik — Osváth, Ötvös, Kinyik, Lenzsér, Silye (R. Varga (substituted on) 76') — Mezei (Győrfi (substituted on) 65'), Vécsei, K. Papp — Windecker (c), B. Tóth (Böde (substituted on) 76') • Coach: György Bognár; Player of the match: Ádám Kovácsik, Paks 9.0 (Source:)

24 November 2024 14	Paks	2–2	Zalaegerszeg	Paks
13:00 CET	Osváth 40' (yellow card) 66'; Böde 82'	Report	Várkonyi (red card) 36'; Mim 45+1', 74'; Evangelou (yellow card) 77'	Stadium: Fehérvári úti Stadion; Attendance: 1,912; Referee: Péter Antal; Assistant referees: Norbert Bornemissza, István Szécsényi
Note: PAKS: Kovácsik — Ötvös, Kinyik, J. Szabó (c) — Osváth, Mezei (R. Varga (substituted on) 67'), Vécsei (Ke. Horváth (substituted on) 79'), K. Papp (Zimonyi (substituted on) 11'), Silye (Győrfi (substituted on) 46') — Windecker, B. Tóth (Böde (substituted on) 67') • Coach: György Bognár; Player of the match: Gergely Mim, Zalaegerszeg 8.9 • Best player of Paks: János Szabó 8.3 (Source:)

29 November 2024 15	Nyíregyháza	4–2	Paks	Nyíregyháza
20:00 CET	Beke 2', 20'; Kovácsréti 18'; Toma (yellow card) 27'; Gengeliczki (yellow card) 65'; Keita (yellow card) 66'; Babić (yellow card) 88' (goal) 90'; B. Nagy (yellow card) 90+2'	Report	Keresztes 39' (o.g.); B. Tóth (yellow card) 65'; Böde 84'; Ötvös (yellow card) 89'	Stadium: Városi Stadion; Attendance: 4,052; Referee: József Erdős; Assistant referees: Norbert Bornemissza, Dániel Szalai
Note: PAKS: Kovácsik — K. Kovács (Győrfi (substituted on) 46'), Vas, Kinyik, Lenzsér (Ke. Horváth (substituted on) 46'), Osváth — Vécsei (Gyurkits (substituted on) 81'), Ötvös, Windecker (c) — R. Varga (Böde (substituted on) 71'), B. Tóth • Coach: György Bognár; Player of the match: Péter Beke, Nyíregyháza 8.7 • Best player of Paks: Attila Osváth 7.8 (Source:)

3 December 2024 5	MTK	3–1	Paks	Budapest
19:00 CET	Jurina 15'; Kata (yellow card) 46'; Hey 68'; Varju 78' (yellow card) 88'	Report	B. Tóth 17'; Vécsei (yellow card) 53'	Stadium: Hidegkuti Nándor Stadion; Attendance: 1,517; Referee: Ferenc Karakó; Assistant referees: Georgiou Theodoros, Balázs Szert
Note: PAKS: Kovácsik — Osváth, Ötvös, Kinyik, J. Szabó (c), Silye (Zimonyi (substituted on) 77') — Windecker, Vécsei, Mezei — Győrfi (R. Varga (substituted on) 46' (Gyurkits (substituted on) 71')), B. Tóth (Böde (substituted on) 62') • Coach: György Bognár; Player of the match: Viktor Hey, MTK 8.4 • Best player of Paks: Ádám Kovácsik 7.6 (Source:)

7 December 2024 16	Paks	4–2	MTK	Paks
19:15 CET	B. Tóth 9'; Kinyik (yellow card) 20'; Vas (yellow card) 56'; Böde 63', 66'; Windecker 73'	Report	Kata (yellow card) 7'; Jurina 15', 39'; Antonov (yellow card) 27'; R. Molnár (yellow card) 32'; P. Kovács I (yellow card) 71'; Kádár (yellow card) 87'	Stadium: Fehérvári úti Stadion; Attendance: 1,601; Referee: Mihály Káprály; Assistant referees: Gergely Becséri, Dávid Rózsa
Note: PAKS: Simon — Osváth, Ötvös, Kinyik, Vas, Silye (Győrfi (substituted on) 46') — Mezei (Ke. Horváth (substituted on) 46'), Vécsei, Windecker — B. Tóth (Gyurkits (substituted on) 77'), Böde (c) (Földi (substituted on) 90+1') • Coach: György Bognár; Player of the match: József Windecker, Paks 9.0 (Source:)

14 December 2024 17	Puskás Akadémia	3–1	Paks	Felcsút
19:30 CET	Zs. Nagy 60' (pen.) (yellow card) 82'; Plšek 81' (yellow card) 83'; Colley 88' (yellow card) 89'	Report	Ötvös (yellow card) 59'; B. Tóth 67'; Kinyik (yellow card) 82'	Stadium: Pancho Aréna; Attendance: 782; Referee: Tamás Bognár; Assistant referees: Péter Kóbor, Norbert Bornemissza
Note: PAKS: Simon — Ötvös, Kinyik, Vas — Osváth, Vécsei (B. Balogh (substituted on) 53'), Windecker (c), Ke. Horváth (Mezei (substituted on) 46'), Silye (Böde (substituted on) 61') — B. Tóth, Skribek (Győrfi (substituted on) 53') • Coach: György Bognár; Player of the match: Zsolt Nagy, Puskás Akadémia 8.0 • Best player of Paks: Barna Tóth 7.4 (Source:)

1 February 2025 18	Paks	1–1	Győr	Paks
14:30 CET	Vécsei (yellow card) 18'; Kinyik (yellow card) 51'; Ötvös 77'; B. Balogh (yellow card) 90+1'	Report	Štefulj (yellow card) 26'; Ouro (yellow card) 71'; Benbouali 79'; Anton (yellow card) 90+4'	Stadium: Fehérvári úti Stadion; Attendance: 2,510; Referee: József Erdős; Assistant referees: Balázs Buzás, Bence Belicza
Note: PAKS: Simon — Lenzsér, Kinyik, Vécsei — Osváth, Mezei (B. Balogh (substituted on) 68'), Windecker (c), Ötvös (K. Papp (substituted on) 89'), Silye — B. Tóth (Böde (substituted on) 67'), Ádám (Könyves (substituted on) 83') • Coach: György Bognár

8 February 2025 19	Paks	2–0	Fehérvár	Paks
17:00 CET	Lenzsér 56' (yellow card) 80'; Böde 90+2'	Report	Simut (yellow card) 60'	Stadium: Fehérvári úti Stadion; Attendance: 2,245; Referee: Márton Rúsz; Assistant referees: Georgiou Theodoros, Dániel Szalai
Note: PAKS: Szappanos — Vécsei, Kinyik, Lenzsér — Osváth, Windecker (Mezei (substituted on) 69'), K. Papp, J. Szabó (c) — Ötvös (B. Balogh (substituted on) 85') — Ádám (Böde (substituted on) 69'), Könyves (B. Tóth (substituted on) 34') • Manager: György Bognár; Player of the match: Bence Lenzsér, Paks 8.4 (Source:)

16 February 2025 20	Ferencváros	0–2	Paks	Budapest
18:00 CET	Romão (yellow card) 83'; Joseph (yellow card) 87'; Abu Fani (yellow card) 90+4'	Report	Lenzsér (yellow card) 46'; Ötvös (yellow card) 47'; Böde 64', 90+5'; Hinora (yellow card) 90+4'	Stadium: Ferencváros Stadion; Attendance: 7,129; Referee: Ferenc Karakó; Assistant referees: Gergely Becséri, Dávid Rózsa
Note: PAKS: Szappanos — Vécsei, Kinyik, Lenzsér — Osváth, Ötvös (Hinora (substituted on) 85'), K. Papp (c), Mezei, Silye — Ádám (Böde (substituted on) 58'), Ke. Horváth (B. Tóth (substituted on) 58') • Manager: György Bognár; Player of the match: Péter Szappanos, Paks 9.3 (Source:)

22 February 2025 21	Paks	4–3	Debrecen	Paks
17:00 CET	K. Papp (yellow card) 26'; Ádám 34' (pen.); Silye 38'; Kinyik (yellow card) 70'; Könyves 75', 89'; Windecker (yellow card) 88'	Report	Malinov (yellow card) 10'; Hegyi (yellow card) 33'; Hofmann (yellow card) 46'; Bárány (yellow card) 55'; Domingues 64'; D. Kocsis (yellow card) 81'; Maurides 71', 90+5'	Stadium: Fehérvári úti Stadion; Attendance: 2,231; Referee: Tamás Bognár; Assistant referees: Vencel Tóth II, Dániel Szalai
Note: PAKS: Szappanos — Lenzsér, Kinyik, Vécsei — Osváth, Ötvös (Ke. Horváth (substituted on) 90'), K. Papp, Windecker (c), Silye (Hinora (substituted on) 88') — Ádám (Böde (substituted on) 71'), B. Tóth (Könyves (substituted on) 71') • Manager: György Bognár; Player of the match: Maurides, Debrecen 9.6 • Best player of Paks: Norbert Könyves 8.6 (Source:)

2 March 2025 22	Kecskemét	2–2	Paks	Kecskemét
16:30 CET	Vágó (yellow card) 23'; Camaj 37', 71' (pen.)	Report	Ötvös (yellow card) 10' (goal) 57'; Ádám 35'; Lenzsér (yellow card) 41'; Windecker (yellow card) 81'	Stadium: Széktói Stadion; Attendance: 2,541; Referee: Márton Rúsz; Assistant referees: Bence Belicza, Péter Ország
Note: PAKS: Szappanos — Osváth, Lenzsér, Kinyik, Vécsei, Silye — K. Papp, Windecker, Ötvös (Könyves (substituted on) 72') — Böde (c) (Mezei (substituted on) 60'), Ádám (B. Tóth (substituted on) 72') • Manager: György Bognár; Player of the match: Driton Camaj, Kecskemét 8.4 • Best player of Paks: Bence Ötvös 7.8 (Source:)

8 March 2025 23	Diósgyőr	0–2	Paks	Miskolc
19:30 CET		Report	Chorbadzhiyski 23' (o.g.); Osváth 48'; Lenzsér (yellow card) 68'	Stadium: Diósgyőri Stadion; Attendance: 4,703; Referee: József Erdős; Assistant referees: Gergely Becséri, Dávid Rózsa
Note: PAKS: Szappanos — Lenzsér, Vas, J. Szabó (c) — Hinora (Silye (substituted on) 82'), K. Papp, Vécsei, Mezei (Ke. Horváth (substituted on) 82'), Osváth — Könyves (B. Tóth (substituted on) 46'), Ádám (Haraszti (substituted on) 74') • Manager: György Bognár; Player of the match: János Szabó, Paks 8.4 (Source:)

14 March 2025 24	Paks	6–1	Újpest	Paks
20:30 CET	B. Tóth 25', 48', 52', 68'; Mezei 57'; Hinora 90'	Report	Brodić 9'; Fiola (yellow card) 67'; Kobouri (yellow card) 88'	Stadium: Fehérvári úti Stadion; Attendance: 3,611; Referee: Balázs Berke; Assistant referees: József Aradi, Bence Belicza
Note: PAKS: Szappanos — Lenzsér (Böde (substituted on) 75'), Vas, J. Szabó (c) — Osváth, Mezei, Vécsei (Haraszti (substituted on) 69'), Ötvös, Silye — K. Papp, B. Tóth (Hinora (substituted on) 84') • Manager: György Bognár; Player of the match: Barna Tóth, Paks 10.0 (Source:)

29 March 2025 25	Zalaegerszeg	1–1	Paks	Zalaegerszeg
17:00 CEST	Szendrei (yellow card) 59'; Krajcsovics 81'; Evangelou (yellow card) 87'	Report	Lenzsér (yellow card) 24'; Könyves 28'; Hinora (yellow card) 54'; Ádám (yellow card) 70'; Ke. Horváth (yellow card) 86'	Stadium: ZTE Arena; Attendance: 2,366; Referee: Marcell Derdák; Assistant referees: Zoltán Horváth, Dávid Rózsa
Note: PAKS: Szappanos — Lenzsér, Vas, J. Szabó (c) — Osváth, Mezei, K. Papp, Hinora (Ke. Horváth (substituted on) 82') — Könyves (Silye (substituted on) 59'), B. Tóth (Ádám (substituted on) 59'), Ötvös (Böde (substituted on) 82') • Manager: György Bognár; Player of the match: Ábel Krajcsovics, Zalaegerszeg 7.7 • Best player of Paks: Bence Lenzsér 7.7 (Source:)

5 April 2025 26	Paks	2–0	Nyíregyháza	Paks
17:00 CEST	K. Papp 21'; Osváth (yellow card) 27' (goal) 66'	Report	Kvekveskiri (yellow card) 40'; Toma (yellow card) 61'	Stadium: Fehérvári úti Stadion; Attendance: 3,002; Referee: István Vad II; Assistant referees: Vencel Tóth II, Gergő Vígh-Tarsonyi
Note: PAKS: Szappanos — Ötvös, Vas, J. Szabó — Hinora (Győrfi (substituted on) 88'), K. Papp, Vécsei, Mezei (Galambos (substituted on) 88'), Osváth — Böde (c), B. Tóth (Ke. Horváth (substituted on) 60') • Manager: György Bognár; Player of the match: Attila Osváth, Paks 9.1 (Source:)

11 April 2025 27	MTK	1–2	Paks	Budapest
20:00 CEST	Hey (yellow card) 27'; R. Molnár (yellow card) 36'; Kosznovszky (yellow card) 39'; I. Bognár 75'	Report	B. Tóth 37'; J. Szabó (yellow card) 46'; Böde 77'	Stadium: Hidegkuti Nándor Stadion; Attendance: 3,492; Referee: Ádám Pillók; Assistant referees: István Szécsényi, Dániel Szalai
Note: PAKS: Szappanos — Hinora (Gyurkits (substituted on) 90+1'), Lenzsér, Vas, J. Szabó (c), Silye — Mezei (Könyves (substituted on) 69'), Vécsei, K. Papp, Ötvös (Ke. Horváth (substituted on) 87') — B. Tóth (Böde (substituted on) 69') • Manager: György Bognár; Player of the match: István Bognár, MTK 7.9 • Best player of Paks: Dániel Böde 7.9 (Source:)

19 April 2025 28	Paks	2–2	Puskás Akadémia	Paks
20:30 CEST	Lenzsér (yellow card) 12'; Böde 21' (pen.); K. Papp (yellow card) 56'; B. Tóth 73'; Ötvös (yellow card) 79'	Report	Favorov (yellow card) 8'; Zs. Nagy 32'; Fameyeh (yellow card) 80' (goal) 90+2'	Stadium: Fehérvári úti Stadion; Attendance: 4,101; Referee: Balázs Berke; Assistant referees: István Szécsényi, Ákos Berényi
Note: PAKS: Szappanos — Lenzsér, Vas, J. Szabó — Silye (Hinora (substituted on) 59'), Vécsei (B. Tóth (substituted on) 46'), Ötvös, Mezei (Windecker (substituted on) 72'), Osváth — K. Papp, Böde (c) (Ke. Horváth (substituted on) 88') • Manager: György Bognár; Player of the match: Zsolt Nagy, Puskás Akadémia 8.2 • Best player of Paks: Péter Szappanos 7.9 (Source:)

26 April 2025 29	Győr	2–0	Paks	Győr
17:30 CEST	Ouro 66'; Štefulj 87'	Report	Windecker (yellow card) 64'	Stadium: ETO Park; Attendance: 4,120; Referee: Márton Rúsz; Assistant referees: Georgiou Theodoros, Dávid Rózsa
Note: PAKS: Szappanos — Hinora, Lenzsér (Könyves (substituted on) 41'), Vas, Vécsei (Haraszti (substituted on) 79'), J. Szabó (c) – K. Papp, Windecker (Kinyik (substituted on) 79'), Mezei (Silye (substituted on) 46'), Ötvös – B. Tóth (Böde (substituted on) 63') • Manager: György Bognár; Player of the match: Daniel Štefulj, Győr 8.4 • Best player of Paks: Péter Szappanos and Bence Lenzsér 7.2 each (Source:)

4 May 2025 30	Fehérvár	0–2	Paks	Székesfehérvár
18:30 CEST	Simut (yellow card) 14'; Stefanelli (yellow card) 43'; Miličević (yellow card) 84'	Report	Böde 44'; Ötvös (yellow card) 59' (goal) 81'	Stadium: Sóstói Stadion; Attendance: 2,867; Referee: Mihály Káprály; Assistant referees: Balázs Szalai, Zoltán Horváth
Note: PAKS: Szappanos — Vas, Ötvös, J. Szabó — Osváth, Ke. Horváth, K. Papp (Gyurkits (substituted on) 87'), Mezei (Haraszti (substituted on) 76'), Silye — Böde (c) (Ádám (substituted on) 76'), B. Tóth (Hinora (substituted on) 63') • Manager: György Bognár; Player of the match: Péter Szappanos, Paks 8.5 (Source:)

10 May 2025 31	Paks	2–3	Ferencváros	Paks
19:30 CEST	Ötvös (yellow card) 5'; Gyurkits 27'; Ádám (yellow card) 34'; B. Tóth (yellow card) 55'; Vécsei (red card) 64'; Vas (yellow card) 86'; Hinora 89'	Report	Saldanha (yellow card) 10'; Szalai 57'; Joseph 72', 90+3'	Stadium: Fehérvári úti Stadion; Attendance: 4,500; Referee: Gergő Bogár; Assistant referees: István Albert, Balázs Buzás
Note: PAKS: Kovácsik — Osváth (Hinora (substituted on) 77'), Kinyik, Silye — Mezei (Ke. Horváth (substituted on) 77'), Gyurkits, Vécsei, B. Balogh (c), Ötvös — Ádám (B. Tóth (substituted on) 46' (substituted off) 71', (Vas (substituted on) 71')), Könyves (Böde (substituted on) 60') • Manager: György Bognár; Player of the match: Lenny Joseph, Ferencváros 8.6 • Best player of Paks: Gergő Gyurkits 8.0 (Source:)

18 May 2025 32	Debrecen	0–0	Paks	Debrecen
16:45 CEST	Lang (yellow card) 80'	Report	Windecker (yellow card) 35'; Ötvös (yellow card) 38'; Szappanos (red card) 72'; Silye (yellow card) 77'	Stadium: Nagyerdei Stadion; Attendance: 8,064; Referee: Balázs Berke; Assistant referees: István Albert, Balázs Buzás
Note: Szappanos — Kinyik, Osváth, Vas, Silye (Hinora (substituted on) 90+4') — Gyurkits (Kovácsik (substituted on) 75'), K. Papp, Windecker (c) (B. Balogh (substituted on) 46'), Ötvös — R. Varga (Böde (substituted on) 63'), B. Tóth (Könyves (substituted on) 63') • Manager: György Bognár; Player of the match: Gábor Vas, Paks 7.6 (Source:)

23 May 2025 33	Paks	1–1	Kecskemét	Paks
20:15 CEST	Böde 43' (pen.)	Report	Májer 90+2'	Stadium: Fehérvári úti Stadion; Attendance: 3,480; Referee: István Vad II; Assistant referees: Vencel Tóth II, István Albert
Note: PAKS: Kovácsik — Ötvös, Vas, Vécsei (Haraszti (substituted on) 68') — Osváth, Mezei (Silye (substituted on) 46'), Windecker (Könyves (substituted on) 76'), K. Papp, Gyurkits — Böde (c), B. Tóth (J. Szabó (substituted on) 46') • Manager: György Bognár; Player of the match: Driton Camaj, Kecskemét 7.4 • Best player of Paks: Kristóf Papp and Bálint Vécsei 7.3 each (Source:)

==== Results overview ====
All results are indicated from the perspective of Paksi FC.
We indicate in parentheses the number of round.
Win Draw Loss Postponed

Opposition	Round 1–22		Round 23–33		Double	Points
Opposition	Home score	Away score	Home score	Away score	Double	Points
Debrecen	4–3 (21)	5–0 (10)		0–0 (32)	9–3	7
Diósgyőr	3–4 (12)	2–2 (1)		2–0 (23)	7–6	4
Fehérvár	2–0 (19)	2–1 (8)		2–0 (30)	6–1	9
Ferencváros	3–1 (9)	2–0 (20)	2–3 (31)		7–4	6
Győr	1–1 (18)	1–2 (7)		0–2 (29)	2–5	1
Kecskemét	1–0 (11)	2–2 (22)	1–1 (33)		4–3	5
MTK	4–2 (16)	1–3 (5)		2–1 (27)	7–6	6
Nyíregyháza	2–1 (4)	2–4 (15)	2–0 (26)		6–5	6
Puskás Akadémia	2–1 (6)	1–3 (17)	2–2 (28)		5–6	4
Újpest	2–1 (2)	0–0 (13)	6–1 (24)		8–2	7
Zalaegerszeg	2–2 (14)	1–3 (3)		1–1 (25)	4–6	2

=== Magyar Kupa ===
==== Round of 64 ====
The draw for the Round of 64 was held on 26 August 2024. The opponent of Mezőörs in the First round was Szakonyfalu, who were beaten 22–0 away. In the Second round, they beat Abda 2–0 at home. The Hungarian Football Association first canceled this match, and later decided to organize the match between the two teams.

9 October 2024 R64	Mezőörs KSE (MB I)	0–3 (Note: One day before the original match date, on 13 September 2024 Mezőörs cancelled the match due to the condition of their football pitch. On 18 September 2024 MLSZ Appeals Committee accepted the appeal of the Mezőörs team and scheduled the Mezőörs–Paks match for 9 October 2024.)	Paks	Mezőörs
14:00 CEST	L. Tóth (yellow card) 68'	Report	B. Tóth 26'; Ötvös 50' (pen.); Gyurkits 79'; R. Varga (yellow card) 42'	Stadium: Mezőörs KSE Sporttelep; Attendance: 1,200; Referee: Attila Molnár; Assistant referees: István Szécsényi, József Aradi
Note: PAKS: B. Simon — Kinyik, Lenzsér (Ötvös (substituted on) 23'), Silye — K. Kovács, R. Varga, Mezei, K. Papp (c) (Windecker (substituted on) 60') Földi (Ke. Horváth (substituted on) 72') — B. Tóth (Pesti (substituted on) 72'), Zimonyi (Gyurkits (substituted on) 60') • Coach: György Bognár

==== Round of 32 ====
The draw for the Round of 64 was held on 16 September 2024.

31 October 2024 R32	Budapest Honvéd (NB II)	1–5	Paks	Budapest
20:00 CET	T. Szabó 35'; Nyitrai (yellow card) 61'	Report	Papp 16', 22'; Zimonyi 29' (pen.); Győrfi 30'; B. Tóth 45+2'; Vas (yellow card) 48'; Gyurkits (yellow card) 50'; B. Balogh (yellow card) 81'	Stadium: Bozsik Aréna; Attendance: 2,110; Referee: Imre Kovács; Assistant referees: Vencel Tóth II, Dávid Rózsa
Note: PAKS: B. Simon — K. Kovács, Vas, Kinyik, Lenzsér — K. Papp (Gyurkits (substituted on) 46'), B. Balogh (c) — R. Varga (Mezei (substituted on) 74'), Zimonyi, Győrfi (Silye (substituted on) 74') — B. Tóth (Windecker (substituted on) 46') • Coach: György Bognár

==== Round of 16 ====
The draw for the Round of 32 was held on 31 October 2024.

26 February 2025 R16	Mezőkövesd (NB II)	0–3	Paks	Mezőkövesd
17:00 CET	Bertus (yellow card) 18'	Report	Windecker (yellow card) 35'; J. Szabó (yellow card) 54'; Győrfi (yellow card) 64'; Ötvös 31' (pen.), 66'; Hinora (yellow card) 80'; R. Varga 85'	Stadium: Városi stadion Attendance: 900; Referee: Imre Kovács; Assistant referees: István Albert, Dávid Rózsa
Note: PAKS: Kovácsik — Győrfi, Ötvös (Horváth (substituted on) 76'), Vas, J. Szabó (c), Hinora — Windecker (K. Papp (substituted on) 62'), Mezei, Haraszti (Lenzsér (substituted on) 46') — Könyves (R. Varga (substituted on) 46'), B. Tóth (Ádám (substituted on) 62') • Manager: György Bognár

==== Quarter-final ====
The draw for the quarter-finals was held on 27 February 2025.

2 April 2025 QF	Kisvárda (NB II)	0–1	Paks	Kisvárda
17:00 CEST	G. Molnár (yellow card) 78'	Report	Osváth 71'	Stadium: Várkerti Stadion; Attendance: 1,578; Referee: Márton Rúsz; Assistant referees: Balázs Szalai, Ákos Berényi
Note: PAKS: Kovácsik — Hinora, Lenzsér, Kinyik, Vas (Mezei (substituted on) 46'), Silye (Osváth (substituted on) 68') — K. Papp, Vécsei (Ke. Horváth (substituted on) 89'), Ötvös — Haraszti (c) (B. Tóth (substituted on) 46'), Ádám (Könyves (substituted on) 76') • Manager: György Bognár

==== Semi-final ====
The draw for the semi-finals was held on 3 April 2025.

22 April 2025 SF	Paks	2–1	Zalaegerszeg (NB I)	Paks
20:00 CEST	Mezei 36'; Hinora (yellow card) 41'; Osváth (yellow card) 50'; Böde 83'	Report	Várkonyi (yellow card) 45'; Evangelou 90+1' (yellow card) 90+3'; Szendrei (yellow card) 90+3'	Stadium: Fehérvári úti Stadion; Attendance: 4,095; Referee: Gergő Bogár; Assistant referees: Norbert Bornemissza, Bence Belicza
Note: PAKS: Kovácsik — Hinora (Osváth (substituted on) 46' (substituted off) 80' (Böde (substituted on) 80')), Lenzsér, Kinyik, Vécsei, Silye — K. Papp, Mezei, Windecker (Gyurkits (substituted on) 74') — Haraszti (c) (Ötvös (substituted on) 58'), Könyves (B. Tóth (substituted on) 58') • Manager: György Bognár

==== Final ====
14 May 2025 F	Ferencváros (NB I)	1–1 (a.e.t.) (3–4 p)	Paks	Budapest
19:00 CEST	Joseph 90+4'; Abu Fani (yellow card) 90+5' (On the bench); A. Tóth (yellow card) 107'; Szalai (yellow card) 118'	Report	J. Szabó (yellow card) 34'; B. Tóth 45+1'; Ötvös (yellow card) 55'; Böde (yellow card) 88'; Szappanos (yellow card) 94'; Ádám (yellow card) 96'; Kinyik (yellow card) 105+1'	Stadium: Puskás Aréna; Referee: Csaba Pintér; Assistant referees: Péter Kóbor, Balázs Szert
	Penalties
	Pešić (penalty missed); Zachariassen (penalty scored); Joseph (penalty missed); Gustavo (penalty scored); Cissé (penalty scored)		Windecker (penalty scored); Ádám (penalty scored); Balogh (penalty missed); Gyurkits (penalty scored); Vécsei (penalty scored)
Note: PAKS: Szappanos — Ötvös (Kinyik (substituted on) 79'), Hinora (Ádám (substituted on) 91'), J. Szabó (c) (Gyurkits (substituted on) 106') – Osváth, Mezei (B. Balogh (substituted on) 90'), K. Papp, Windecker, Vas – B. Tóth (Böde (substituted on) 75'), Haraszti (Vécsei (substituted on) 75') • Manager: György Bognár

=== UEFA Europa League ===
==== First qualifying round ====
The draw was held on 18 June 2024.

11 July 2024 First leg	Paks	0–4	(Romania) Corvinul Hunedoara	Paks
19:00 CEST	Kinyik (yellow card) 32'; Vécsei (yellow card) 72'; B. Szabó (red card) 76'	Report	Buș 9'; Lupu 45+2', 86', 90+3'; Maxim (yellow card) 52'; Neacșa (yellow card) 86'; Bradu (yellow card) 89'; Manolache (yellow card) 90+8'	Stadium: Fehérvári úti Stadion; Attendance: 4,182; Referee: Mohammad Usman Aslam (Norway); Assistant referees: Tom Harald Grønevik, Jørgen Rønning Valstadsve
Note: PAKS: Szappanos — J. Szabó (c), Kinyik, Lenzsér — Osváth, Windecker (Vécsei (substituted on) 69'), Balogh (Haraszti (substituted on) 46'), K. Papp, Silye (B. Tóth (substituted on) 46' (substituted off) 81' (Sz. Mezei (substituted on) 81')) — B. Szabó, Könyves (Böde (substituted on) 62') • Coach: György Bognár

18 July 2024 Second leg	Corvinul Hunedoara (Romania)	0–2 (4–2 agg.)	Paks	Sibiu, Romania
20:00 (21:00 EEST)	Buş (yellow card) 90+1'	Report	Kinyik (yellow card) 49'; K. Kovács (yellow card) 54'; Könyves 79'; Windecker (yellow card) 81'; Böde 90'; J. Szabó (yellow card) 90'	Stadium: Sibiu Municipal Stadium, Sibiu (Note: Corvinul Hunedoara played their home match at the Sibiu Municipal Stadium in Sibiu, instead of their regular stadium, the Michael Klein Stadium, in Hunedoara, which did not meet UEFA requirements.); Attendance: 8,582; Referee: Peter Kralović (Slovak); Assistant referees: Milan Štrbo, Dušan Štofik
Note: PAKS: Szappanos — Ötvös, Kinyik, J. Szabó (c) — Osváth, Mezei (Windecker (substituted on) 62'), Vécsei (G. Vas (substituted on) 71'), K. Papp, K. Kovács (Silye (substituted on) 62') — Hahn (Böde (substituted on) 62'), Könyves • Coach: György Bognár

Corvinul Hunedoara won 4–2 on aggregate.

=== UEFA Conference League ===
==== Second qualifying round ====
25 July 2024 First leg	Paks (Hungary)	3–0	(Cyprus) AEK Larnaca	Paks
20:00 CEST	Haraszti 17'; Vécsei (yellow card) 24'; K. Papp (yellow card) 44'; B. Tóth 61'; Ötvös 74'; Kinyik (yellow card) 90+2'	Report	Ledes (yellow card) 42'; Alomerović (yellow card) 74'	Stadium: Fehérvári úti Stadion; Attendance: 2,277; Referee: Dennis Higler (Netherlands); Assistant referees: De Nas Roy Albert, De Groot Stefan
Note: PAKS: Szappanos — Osváth, Kinyik, Vas, Ötvös, J. Szabó (c) — Vécsei (B. Balogh (substituted on) 81'), K. Papp (Böde (substituted on) 90'), Windecker — Haraszti (Mezei (substituted on) 81'), Hahn (B. Tóth (substituted on) 41' (substituted off) 90' (K. Horváth (substituted on) 90') • Coach: György Bognár

1 August 2024 Second leg	AEK Larnaca (Cyprus)	0–2 (0–5 agg.)	(Hungary) Paks	Larnaca, Cyprus
18:00 (19:00 EEST)	Cabrera (yellow card) 19'; García (yellow card) 35'	Report	Haraszti 19'; Osváth (yellow card) 37'; K. Papp 42'; Vas (yellow card) 73'	Stadium: AEK Arena – Georgios Karapatakis; Attendance: 3,249; Referee: Luca Cibelli (Switzerland); Assistant referees: Matthias Sbrissa, Vital Jobin
Note: PAKS: Szappanos — Osváth (K. Kovács (substituted on) 81'), Ötvös, Vas, Lenzsér, J. Szabó (c) — Windecker (Silye (substituted on) 81'), Vécsei, K. Papp (Balogh (substituted on) 74') – B. Tóth (Böde (substituted on) 60'), Haraszti (B. Szabó (substituted on) 60') • Coach: György Bognár

Paksi FC won 5–0 on aggregate.

==== Third qualifying round ====
The draw was held on 22 July 2024.

7 August 2024 First leg	Paks	3–0	(Montenegro) Mornar Bar	Paks
19:00 CEST	Böde 59'; B. Szabó 90+9' (pen.); B. Tóth 90+10'	Report	Ondong Mba (red card) 41'; Djurišić (yellow card) 59' (yellow-red card) 62'; Kaludjerović (yellow card) 64'; Zorić (yellow card) 86'; Popović (yellow card) 90+2'	Stadium: Fehérvári úti Stadion; Attendance: 2,671; Referee: Dzmitry Dzmitryieu (Belarus); Assistant referees: Denis Emelyanchikov, Anton Paluyanau
Note: PAKS: Szappanos — Ötvös, Kinyik, J. Szabó — Osváth, Vécsei (B. Szabó (substituted on) 46'), K. Papp (Mezei (substituted on) 68'), Windecker (Zimonyi (substituted on) 73'), Vas — Haraszti (B. Kocsis (substituted on) 82'), Böde (c) (B. Tóth (substituted on) 73') • Coach: György Bognár

13 August 2024 Second leg	Mornar Bar (Montenegro)	2–2 (2–5 agg.)	Paks	Nikšić, Montenegro
20:45 CEST	Lenzsér 18' (o.g.); D. Zorić 59'; Kaluđerović (yellow card) 73'	Report	Lenzsér (yellow card) 44'; Windecker 14' (pen.) (yellow card) 88'; D. Zorić 87' (o.g.)	Stadium: Gradski stadion Attendance: 788; Referee: Jasper Vergoote (Belgium); Assistant referees: Martijn Tiesters, Michael Geerolf
Note: PAKS: Szappanos — Ötvös, Kinyik, Lenzsér — Osváth, K. Papp, Vécsei (Balogh (substituted on) 83'), Windecker, J. Szabó (c) (K. Kovács (substituted on) 24') — Mezei (Haraszti (substituted on) 46') — B. Tóth (Böde (substituted on) 61') • Coach: György Bognár

Paksi FC won 5–2 on aggregate.

==== Play-off round ====
22 August 2024 First leg	Mladá Boleslav (Czech Republic)	2–2	Paks	Mladá Boleslav, Czech Republic
18:00 CEST	Kinyik 65' (o.g.); Ladra 90+7'	Report	Lenzsér (yellow card) 5' (yellow-red card) 90+6'; K. Papp (yellow card) 39'; Windecker (yellow card) 64'; Böde 80'; Papp 85'	Stadium: Lokotrans Aréna; Attendance: 4,029; Referee: Goga Kikacheishvili (Georgia (country)); Assistant referees: David Akhvlediani, Davit Gabisonia
Note: PAKS: B. Simon — Ötvös, Kinyik, Lenzsér — K. Kovács (G. Vas (substituted on) 90+4'), Windecker, Vécsei (Balogh (substituted on) 78'), K. Papp, Osváth — Haraszti (c) (Böde (substituted on) 78') — Zimonyi (B. Tóth (substituted on) 46' (substituted off) 90+8'; Silye (substituted on) 90+8') • Coach: György Bognár

29 August 2024 Second leg	Paks	0–3 (2–5 agg.)	(Czech Republic) Mladá Boleslav	Paks
19:00 CEST	Ötvös (yellow card) 54'	Report	Jawo 48'; Králik 55'; Trmal (yellow card) 81'; Pulkrab (yellow card) 85' (goal) 90+2'; Suchý (yellow card) 88'	Stadium: Fehérvári úti Stadion; Attendance: 3,684; Referee: Guillermo Cuadra Fernández (Spain); Assistant referees: Iñigo Prieto, Iker De Francisco
Note: PAKS: B. Simon — Ötvös, Kinyik, G. Vas — Osváth, Vécsei (Balogh (substituted on) 68'), K. Papp, Mezei (Böde (substituted on) 57'), J. Szabó (c) (B. Szabó (substituted on) 76') — Haraszti (Silye (substituted on) 57') — B. Tóth • Coach: György Bognár

Mladá Boleslav won 5–2 on aggregate.

== Squad statistics ==
As of match played 29 November 2024

Keys
Rk.	Rank	No.	Squad number	Pos.	Position
Opponent	The opponent team without a flag is Hungarian.			(N)	The game was played at a neutral site.
(H)	Paksi FC were the home team.			(A)	Paksi FC were the away team.
Player	Young Hungarian Player, who is a Hungarian player and was born 2004 or after				
Player^{*}	Player who joined Paksi FC on loan during the season				
Player^{⊕}	Player who joined Paksi FC permanently during the season				
Player^{†}	Player who departed Paksi FC permanently or on loan during the season				

=== Appearances ===
Includes all competitions for senior teams.
We indicate the number of the player's appearances as substitute by the combination of a plus sign and a figure.
We indicate with gold color the maximum appearances only in the competition in which the team has already played at least 2 matches.

No.	Pos.	Nat.	Player	Nemzeti Bajnokság I	Magyar Kupa	Europa League	Conference League	Season total	Ref.
Goalkeepers
1	GK	(Hungary)	Ádám Kovácsik	7	0	0	0	7	
25	GK	(Hungary)	Péter Szappanos^{*⊕}	0	0	0	0	0	
31	GK	(Hungary)	Márk Gyetván^{⊕}	0	0	0	0	0	
	GK	(Hungary)	Vilmos Borsos	0	0	0	0	0	
Defenders
2	DF	(Hungary)	Ákos Kinyik	13	2	2	5	22	
6	DF	(Hungary)	Milán Győrfi	1+6	1	0	0	2+6	
11	DF	(Hungary)	Attila Osváth	10+1	0	2	6	18+1	
12	DF	(Hungary)	Gábor Vas	7+1	1	0+1	4+1	12+3	
24	DF	(Hungary)	Bence Lenzsér	6+1	2	1	3	12+1	
30	DF	(Hungary)	János Szabó (c)	6+1	0	2	5	13+1	
Midfielders
5	MF	(Hungary)	Bálint Vécsei	9+3	0	1+1	6	16+4	
8	MF	(Hungary)	Balázs Balogh	5+1	1	1	0+5	7+6	
14	MF	(Hungary)	Erik Silye	10+2	1+1	1+1	0+3	12+7	
18	MF	(Hungary)	Gergő Gyurkits	1+2	0+2	0	0	1+4	
21	MF	(Hungary)	Kristóf Papp	12	2	2	6	22	
22	MF	(Hungary)	József Windecker	9+5	0+2	1+1	5	15+8	
23	MF	(Hungary)	Bence Ötvös	12+2	0+1	1	6	19+3	
26	MF	(Hungary)	Szabolcs Mezei	10+1	1+1	1+1	2+2	14+5	
	MF	(Hungary)	Kristóf Hinora^{⊕}	0	0	0	0	0	
Forwards
7	FW	(Hungary)	Martin Ádám	0	0	0	0	0	
9	FW	(Hungary)	János Hahn	0	0	1	1	2	
10	FW	(Hungary)	Zsolt Haraszti	2+2	0	0+1	5+1	7+4	
13	FW	(Hungary)	Dániel Böde	2+12	0	0+2	1+5	3+19	
15	FW	(Hungary)	Norbert Könyves	0	0	2	0	2	
16	FW	(Hungary)	Zoltán Pesti	0	0+1	0	0	0+1	
17	FW	(Hungary)	Roland Varga	1+6	2	0	0	3+6	
19	FW	(Hungary)	Kevin Horváth	1+4	0+1	0	0+1	1+6	
29	FW	(Hungary)	Barna Tóth	11+2	2	0+1	3+3	16+6	
	FW	(Hungary)	Ákos Szendrei^{⊕}	0	0	0	0	0	
Players who departed the club on loan but featured this season
Players who left the club during the season
(1)	GK	(Hungary)	Péter Szappanos^{†}	2	0	2	4	8	
(3)	DF	(Hungary)	Norbert Szélpál^{†}	0	0	0	0	0	
(7)	FW	(Hungary)	Alen Skribek^{†}	0	0	0	0	0	
(15)	FW	(Hungary)	Dávid Zimonyi^{†}	3+6	2	0	1+1	6+7	
(17)	MF	(Hungary)	Bence Kocsis^{†}	0	0	0	0+1	0+1	
(20)	DF	(Hungary)	Krisztián Kovács^{†}	6+1	2	1	1+2	10+3	
(25)	GK	(Hungary)	Barnabás Simon^{†}	5	2	0	2	9	
(27)	MF	(Hungary)	Bálint Szabó^{†}	3+1	0	1	0+3	4+4	
(28)	MF	(Hungary)	Dominik Földi	0+1	1	0	0	1+1	

Notes: GK: goalkeeper; DF: defender; MF: midfielder; FW: forward

=== Goal scorers ===
Includes all competitions for senior teams. The list is sorted by squad number when season-total goals are equal. Players with no goals not included in the list.
We indicate in parentheses how many of the goals scored by the player from penalties.

Rk.	No.	Pos.	Nat.	Player	Nemzeti Bajnokság I	Magyar Kupa	Europa League	Conference League	Season total
1	13	FW	(Hungary)	Dániel Böde	6	0	1	2	9
2	23	MF	(Hungary)	Bence Ötvös	5 (3)	1 (1)	0	1	7 (4)
2	29	FW	(Hungary)	Barna Tóth	3	2	0	2	7
3	22	MF	(Hungary)	József Windecker	5 (2)	0	0	1 (1)	6 (3)
4	21	MF	(Hungary)	Kristóf Papp	1	2	0	2	5
5	10	FW	(Hungary)	Zsolt Haraszti	0	0	0	2	2
5	11	DF	(Hungary)	Attila Osváth	2	0	0	0	2
6	2	DF	(Hungary)	Ákos Kinyik	1	0	0	0	1
6	5	MF	(Hungary)	Bálint Vécsei	1	0	0	0	1
6	15	DF	(Hungary)	Milán Győrfi	0	1	0	0	1
6	14	DF	(Hungary)	Erik Silye	1	0	0	0	1
6	15	FW	(Hungary)	Norbert Könyves	0	0	1	0	1
6	(15)	FW	(Hungary)	Dávid Zimonyi^{†}	0	1 (1)	0	0	1 (1)
6	18	MF	(Hungary)	Gergő Gyurkits	0	1	0	0	1
6	26	MF	(Hungary)	Szabolcs Mezei	1	0	0	0	1
6	(27)	MF	(Hungary)	Bálint Szabó^{†}	0	0	0	1 (1)	1 (1)
				Opponent Own goal	2	0	0	1	3
Total					28 (5)	8 (2)	2	12 (2)	50 (9)

=== Penalties ===
Date	Penalty Taker	Scored	Opponent	Competition
28 July 2024	(Hungary) József Windecker	Yes	Diósgyőr (A)	Nemzeti Bajnokság I, Round 1
7 August 2024	(Hungary) Bálint Szabó^{†}	Yes	Mornar Bar (H)	UEFA Conference League, Third qualifying round
13 August 2024	(Hungary) József Windecker	Yes	Mornar Bar (A)	UEFA Conference League, Third qualifying round
1 September 2024	(Hungary) József Windecker	Yes	Puskás Akadémia (H)	Nemzeti Bajnokság I, Round 6
29 September 2024	(Hungary) Bence Ötvös	Yes	Fehérvár (A)	Nemzeti Bajnokság I, Round 8
9 October 2024	(Hungary) Bence Ötvös	Yes	Mezőörs (A)	Magyar Kupa, Round of 64
19 October 2024	(Hungary) Bence Ötvös	Yes	Debrecen (A)	Nemzeti Bajnokság I, Round 10
27 October 2024	(Hungary) Bence Ötvös	Yes	Kecskemét (H)	Nemzeti Bajnokság I, Round 11
31 October 2024	(Hungary) Dávid Zimonyi^{†}	Yes	Budapest Honvéd (A)	Magyar Kupa, Round of 32

=== Own goals ===
Key
Score	The score is at the time of the own goal.		
(H)	Paksi FC were the home team.	(A)	Paksi FC were the away team.

Pos.	Nat.	Player	Minute	Score	Result	Opponent	Competition	Date
DF	(Hungary)	Bence Lenzsér	18	0–1	2–2	Mornar Bar (Montenegro) (A)	UEFA Conference League, Third qualifying round	13 August 2024
DF	(Hungary)	Ákos Kinyik	65	0–1	2–2	Mladá Boleslav (Czech Republic) (A)	UEFA Conference League, Play-off round	22 August 2024

=== Hat-tricks ===
Key
Score	The score is at the time of the goals.		
(H)	Paks were the home team.	(A)	Paks were the away team.

Pos.	Nat.	Player	Minutes	Score	Result	Opponent	Competition	Date
FW	(Hungary)	Barna Tóth	25', 48', 52', 68'	1–1, 2–1, 3–1, 5–1	6–1 (H)	Újpest	Nemzeti Bajnokság I, Round 24	14 March 2025

=== Assists ===
Includes all competitions for senior teams. The list is sorted by squad number when season-total assists are equal. Players with no assists not included in the list.

Rk.	No.	Pos.	Nat.	Player	Nemzeti Bajnokság I	Magyar Kupa	Europa League	Conference League	Season total
1	21	MF	(Hungary)	Kristóf Papp	2	0	1	1	4
1	26	MF	(Hungary)	Szabolcs Mezei	3	0	0	1	4
2	11	DF	(Hungary)	Attila Osváth	2	0	0	1	3
3	5	MF	(Hungary)	Bálint Vécsei	1	0	0	1	2
3	22	MF	(Hungary)	József Windecker	0	0	1	1	2
4	6	DF	(Hungary)	Milán Győrfi	1	0	0	0	1
4	8	MF	(Hungary)	Balázs Balogh	1	0	0	0	1
4	10	FW	(Hungary)	Zsolt Haraszti	1	0	0	0	1
4	13	FW	(Hungary)	Dániel Böde	0	0	0	1	1
4	(15)	FW	(Hungary)	Dávid Zimonyi^{†}	1	0	0	0	1
4	17	FW	(Hungary)	Roland Varga	1	0	0	0	1
4	(27)	MF	(Hungary)	Bálint Szabó^{†}	1	0	0	0	1
Total					14	0	2	6	22

=== Goalkeepers ===
==== Clean sheets ====
Includes all competitions for senior teams. The list is sorted by squad number when season-total clean sheets are equal. Numbers in parentheses represent games where both goalkeepers participated and both kept a clean sheet; the number in parentheses is awarded to the goalkeeper who was substituted on, whilst a full clean sheet is awarded to the goalkeeper who was on the field at the start of play.
We indicate in parentheses how many of the goals scored from penalties.

Games and Goals							Clean sheets				
Rk.	No.	Nat.	Goalkeeper	Games Played	Goals Against	Goals Against Average	Nemzeti Bajnokság I	Magyar Kupa	Europa League	Conference League	Season total
1	(1)	(Hungary)	Péter Szappanos^{†}	8	8	1.00	0	0	1	3	4
2	1	(Hungary)	Ádám Kovácsik	7	11	1.57	3	0	0	0	3
3	(25)	(Hungary)	Barnabás Simon^{†}	9	15	1.67	0	1	0	0	1
Total					34		3	1	1	3	8

==== Penalties saving ====
Date	Goalkeeper	Penalty Kick Save	Penalty Taker	Opponent	Competition	Min.

=== Disciplinary record ===
Includes all competitions for senior teams. The list is sorted by red cards, then yellow cards (and by squad number when total cards are equal). Players with no cards not included in the list.

Rk.	No.	Pos.	Nat.	Player	Nemzeti Bajnokság I				Magyar Kupa				Europa League				Conference League				Season total			
Rk.	No.	Pos.	Nat.	Player	Yellow card	Second yellow card	Red card	MM	Yellow card	Second yellow card	Red card	MM	Yellow card	Second yellow card	Red card	MM	Yellow card	Second yellow card	Red card	MM	Yellow card	Second yellow card	Red card	MM
1	24	DF	(Hungary)	Bence Lenzsér	0	0	0	0	0	0	0	0	0	0	0	0	1	1	0	1	1	1	0	1
2	(27)	MF	(Hungary)	Bálint Szabó^{†}	0	0	0	0	0	0	0	0	0	0	1	1	0	0	0	0	0	0	1	1
3	2	DF	(Hungary)	Ákos Kinyik	5	0	0	1	0	0	0	0	2	0	0	0	1	0	0	0	8	0	0	1
4	22	MF	(Hungary)	József Windecker	2	0	0	0	0	0	0	0	1	0	0	0	2	0	0	0	5	0	0	0
5	(20)	DF	(Hungary)	Krisztián Kovács^{†}	3	0	0	0	0	0	0	0	1	0	0	0	0	0	0	0	4	0	0	0
6	11	DF	(Hungary)	Attila Osváth	2	0	0	0	0	0	0	0	0	0	0	0	1	0	0	0	3	0	0	0
6	26	MF	(Hungary)	Szabolcs Mezei	3	0	0	0	0	0	0	0	0	0	0	0	0	0	0	0	3	0	0	0
7	5	MF	(Hungary)	Bálint Vécsei	0	0	0	0	0	0	0	0	1	0	0	0	1	0	0	0	2	0	0	0
7	6	DF	(Hungary)	Milán Győrfi	2	0	0	0	0	0	0	0	0	0	0	0	0	0	0	0	2	0	0	0
7	12	MF	(Hungary)	Gábor Vas	0	0	0	0	1	0	0	0	0	0	0	0	1	0	0	0	2	0	0	0
7	18	MF	(Hungary)	Gergő Gyurkits	1	0	0	0	1	0	0	0	0	0	0	0	0	0	0	0	2	0	0	0
7	21	MF	(Hungary)	Kristóf Papp	0	0	0	0	0	0	0	0	0	0	0	0	2	0	0	0	2	0	0	0
7	23	MF	(Hungary)	Bence Ötvös	2	0	0	0	0	0	0	0	0	0	0	0	0	0	0	0	2	0	0	0
8	8	MF	(Hungary)	Balázs Balogh	0	0	0	0	1	0	0	0	0	0	0	0	0	0	0	0	1	0	0	0
8	10	FW	(Hungary)	Zsolt Haraszti	1	0	0	0	0	0	0	0	0	0	0	0	0	0	0	0	1	0	0	0
8	13	FW	(Hungary)	Dániel Böde	1	0	0	0	0	0	0	0	0	0	0	0	0	0	0	0	1	0	0	0
8	14	MF	(Hungary)	Erik Silye	1	0	0	0	0	0	0	0	0	0	0	0	0	0	0	0	1	0	0	0
8	(15)	FW	(Hungary)	Dávid Zimonyi^{†}	1	0	0	0	0	0	0	0	0	0	0	0	0	0	0	0	1	0	0	0
8	17	FW	(Hungary)	Roland Varga	0	0	0	0	1	0	0	0	0	0	0	0	0	0	0	0	1	0	0	0
8	30	DF	(Hungary)	János Szabó (c)	0	0	0	0	0	0	0	0	1	0	0	0	0	0	0	0	1	0	0	0
8	29	FW	(Hungary)	Barna Tóth	1	0	0	0	0	0	0	0	0	0	0	0	0	0	0	0	1	0	0	0
Total					25	0	0	1	4	0	0	0	6	0	1	1	9	1	0	1	44	1	1	3

=== Suspensions ===
Player	Date Received	Offence	Competition	Length of suspension			
(Hungary) Bálint Szabó^{†}	11 July 2024	(red card) 76' vs Hunedoara (H)	Europa League, First Qualification Round	1 Match	Hunedoara (A)	Europa League, First Qualification Round	18 July 2024
(Hungary) Bence Lenzsér	22 August 2024	(yellow card) 5' (yellow-red card) 90+6' vs Mladá Boleslav (A)	Conference League, Play-off round	1 Match	Mladá Boleslav (H)	Conference League, Play-off round	29 August 2024
(Hungary) Ákos Kinyik	19 October 2024	5th (yellow card) after Debrecen (A)	NB I, Round 10	1 Match	Kecskemét (H)	NB I, Round 11	27 October 2024

=== Injuries ===
Player	Last game before suffering an injury			First game after recovering from an injury			Miss.	Ref.
Player	Date	Opponent	Competition	Date	Competition	Offence	Miss.	Ref.
(Hungary) Norbert Szélpál	Pre-season			TBD			14	
(Hungary) János Hahn	25 July 2024	(substituted off) 41' vs AEK Larnaca (Cyprus) (H)	Conference League, Second qualifying round	TBD			12	
(Hungary) Alen Skribek	3 August 2024	(substituted off) 30' Paks II vs MTK II (H)	NB III, Round 1	TBD			9	
(Hungary) János Szabó (c)	13 August 2024	(substituted off) 24' vs Mornar Bar (Montenegro) (A)	Conference League, Third qualifying round	29 August 2024	Conference League, Play-off round	vs Mladá Boleslav (Czech Republic) (H)	3	
(Hungary) Gábor Vas	4 September 2024	Training in Hungary national football team		TBD			0	
(Hungary) Bence Lenzsér	9 October 2024	(substituted off) 23' vs Mezőörs (A)	Magyar Kupa, Round of 64	TBD			0	
(Hungary) József Windecker	2 March 2025	after Kecskemét (A)	Round 22	TBD			1	
(Hungary) Kevin Horváth	21 March 2025	(substituted off) 29' vs Kozármisleny friendly match (H)		TBD			0	

=== Captains ===
Includes all competitions for senior teams. The list is sorted by squad number when season-total number of games where a player started as captain are equal. Players with no games started as captain not included in the list.

Rk.	No.	Pos.	Nat.	Player	Nemzeti Bajnokság I	Magyar Kupa	Europa League	Conference League	Season total
1	30	DF	(Hungary)	János Szabó	11	2	2	4	19
2	13	FW	(Hungary)	Dániel Böde	8	0	0	1	9
3	22	MF	(Hungary)	József Windecker	7	0	0	0	7
4	10	FW	(Hungary)	Zsolt Haraszti	2	2	0	1	5
5	8	MF	(Hungary)	Balázs Balogh	3	1	0	0	4
5	21	MF	(Hungary)	Kristóf Papp	2	1	0	0	3
Total					33	6	2	6	47

== Attendances ==
The table contains the number of attendances of Paksi FC domestic matches.
Clicking on the competitions leads to the number of spectators for all the matches of the competitions.
The gold indicates the highest attendances, and the lowest attendances with pink .
Home stadium: Fehérvári úti Stadion, Paks • Capacity: 6,150

League	Matches	Attendances	Average		High		Low	
League	Matches	Attendances	Att.	%	Att.	%	Att.	%
Nemzeti Bajnokság I	16	46,948	2,934	47.7%	4,500	73.2%	1,601	26.0%
Magyar Kupa	1	4,095	4,095	66.6%	4,095	66.6%	4,095	66.6%
UEFA Europa League	1	4,182	4,182	68.0%	4,182	68.0%	4,182	68.0%
UEFA Conference League	3	8,632	2,877	46.8%	3,684	59.9%	2,277	37.0%
Total	21	63,857	3,041	49.4%	4,500	73.2%	1,601	26.0%

Nemzeti Bajnokság I
Round	Date	Opponent	Attendances	%	Ref.
Round 2	4 August 2024	Újpest	3,765	61.2%	
Round 4	18 August 2024	Nyíregyháza	2,219	36.1%	
Round 6	1 September 2024	Puskás Akadémia	1,877	30.5%	
Round 9	6 October 2024	Ferencváros	4,388	71.3%	
Round 11	27 October 2024	Kecskemét	3,005	48.9%	
Round 12	3 November 2024	Diósgyőr	2,501	40.7%	
Round 14	24 November 2024	Zalaegerszeg	1,912	31.1%	
Round 16	7 December 2024	MTK	1,601	26.0%	
Round 18	1 February 2025	Győr	2,510	40.8%	
Round 19	8 February 2025	Fehérvár	2,245	36.5%	
Round 21	22 February 2025	Debrecen	2,231	36.3%	
Round 24	14 March 2025	Újpest	3,611	58.7%	
Round 26	5 April 2025	Nyíregyháza	3,002	48.8%	
Round 28	19 April 2025	Puskás Akadémia	4,101	66.7%	
Round 31	10 May 2025	Ferencváros	4,500	73.2%	
Round 33	23 May 2025	Kecskemét	3,480	56.6%	
Total			46,948	—	
Average			2,934	47.7%	

Magyar Kupa
Round	Date	Opponent	Attendances	%	Ref.
Semi-final	22 April 2025	Zalaegerszeg	4,095	66.6%	
Total			4,095	—	
Average			4,095	66.6%	

UEFA Europa League
Round	Date	Opponent	Attendances	%	Ref.
Qualifying, Round 1	11 July 2024	(Romania) Corvinul Hunedoara	4,182	68.0%	
Total			4,182	—	
Average			4,182	68.0%	

UEFA Conference League
Round	Date	Opponent	Attendances	%	Ref.
Qualifying, Round 2	25 July 2024	(Cyprus) AEK Larnaca	2,277	37.0%	
Qualifying, Round 3	7 August 2024	(Montenegro) Mornar Bar	2,671	43.4%	
Play-off round	29 August 2024	(Czech Republic) Mladá Boleslav	3,684	59.9%	
Total			8,632	—	
Average			2,877	46.8%	

== Awards and nominations ==
Keys
M	Matches	W	Won	D	Drawn	L	Lost
Pts	Points	GF	Goals for	GA	Goals against	GD	Goal difference
Pos.	Position	Pld	Played	G	Goals	A	Assists
(H)	Paksi FC were the home team.			(A)	Paksi FC were the away team.		
Player	Young Hungarian Player, who is a Hungarian player and was born 2004 or after						
Player^{*}	Player who joined Paksi FC permanently or on loan during the season						
Player^{†}	Player who departed Paksi FC permanently or on loan during the season						

=== Weekly awards ===
==== Player of the Round ====
Selection of the Round of Nemzeti Bajnokság by M4 Sport TV, Nemzeti Sport, Csakfoci and Sofascore websites and Player of the Week (POW) by Nemzeti Sport.

Round	Opponent	Pos.	Player	Selection of the Round				POW	Ref.
Round	Opponent	Pos.	Player	Nemzeti Sport	M4 Sport TV	Csakfoci	Sofascore	POW	Ref.
Round 2	Újpest (H)	MF	(Hungary) Szabolcs Mezei			Yes			
Round 4	Nyíregyháza (H)	DF	(Hungary) Ákos Kinyik			Yes			
Round 4	Nyíregyháza (H)	DF	(Hungary) Erik Silye			Yes			
Round 6	Puskás Akadémia (H)	DF	(Hungary) Bence Lenzsér		Yes				
Round 6	Puskás Akadémia (H)	DF	(Hungary) Gábor Vas			Yes			
Round 6	Puskás Akadémia (H)	MF	(Hungary) Kristóf Papp			Yes			
Round 6	Puskás Akadémia (H)	MF	(Hungary) József Windecker		Yes	Yes			
Round 9	Ferencváros (H)	GK	(Hungary) Ádám Kovácsik		Yes	Yes			
Round 9	Ferencváros (H)	DF	(Hungary) Ákos Kinyik			Yes			
Round 9	Ferencváros (H)	DF	(Hungary) Attila Osváth		Yes	Yes			
Round 9	Ferencváros (H)	FW	(Hungary) Dániel Böde		Yes	Yes			
Round 10	Debrecen (A)	DF	(Hungary) Attila Osváth		Yes	Yes			
Round 10	Debrecen (A)	MF	(Hungary) Bálint Vécsei		Yes				
Round 10	Debrecen (A)	MF	(Hungary) Bence Ötvös		Yes				
Round 10	Debrecen (A)	MF	(Hungary) Kristóf Papp			Yes			
Round 10	Debrecen (A)	FW	(Hungary) Barna Tóth		Yes	Yes			
Round 11	Kecskemét (H)	DF	(Hungary) Gábor Vas			Yes			
Round 11	Kecskemét (H)	MF	(Hungary) Bence Ötvös			Yes			
Round 12	Diósgyőr (H)	FW	(Hungary) Dániel Böde		Yes	Yes			
Round 13	Újpest (A)	GK	(Hungary) Ádám Kovácsik			Yes			
Round 13	Újpest (A)	DF	(Hungary) Attila Osváth			Yes			
Round 14	Zalaegerszeg (H)	DF	(Hungary) Attila Osváth			Yes			
Round 16	MTK (H)	GK	(Hungary) Barnabás Simon		Yes				
Round 16	MTK (H)	MF	(Hungary) Milán Győrfi		Yes	Yes			
Round 16	MTK (H)	FW	(Hungary) Dániel Böde		Yes	Yes			
Round 16	MTK (H)	FW	(Hungary) József Windecker		Yes				
Round 18	Győr (H)	DF	(Hungary) Bálint Vécsei		Yes				
Round 18	Győr (H)	MF	(Hungary) Bence Ötvös		Yes	Yes			
Round 19	Fehérvár (H)	DF	(Hungary) Bence Lenzsér		Yes	Yes			
Round 19	Fehérvár (H)	MF	(Hungary) Kristóf Papp		Yes				
Round 20	Ferencváros (A)	GK	(Hungary) Péter Szappanos		Yes	Yes			
Round 20	Ferencváros (A)	DF	(Hungary) Attila Osváth		Yes	Yes			
Round 20	Ferencváros (A)	DF	(Hungary) Ákos Kinyik		Yes				
Round 20	Ferencváros (A)	FW	(Hungary) Dániel Böde		Yes	Yes			
Round 21	Debrecen (H)	DF	(Hungary) Bence Lenzsér			Yes			
Round 21	Debrecen (H)	MF	(Hungary) Bence Ötvös		Yes		Yes		
Round 21	Debrecen (H)	FW	(Hungary) Norbert Könyves		Yes		Yes		
Round 22	Kecskemét (A)	GK	(Hungary) Péter Szappanos			Yes			
Round 22	Kecskemét (A)	MF	(Hungary) Bence Ötvös		Yes		Yes		
Round 23	Diósgyőr (A)	DF	(Hungary) János Szabó		Yes		Yes		
Round 23	Diósgyőr (A)	DF	(Hungary) Attila Osváth		Yes	Yes	Yes		
Round 23	Diósgyőr (A)	MF	(Hungary) Kristóf Papp		Yes		Yes		
Round 23	Diósgyőr (A)	MF	(Hungary) Szabolcs Mezei		Yes	Yes	Yes		
Round 24	Újpest (H)	DF	(Hungary) Attila Osváth		Yes	Yes	Yes		
Round 24	Újpest (H)	MF	(Hungary) Szabolcs Mezei		Yes		Yes		
Round 24	Újpest (H)	MF	(Hungary) Kristóf Papp			Yes			
Round 24	Újpest (H)	MF	(Hungary) Kristóf Hinora^{⊕} (s)			Yes			
Round 24	Újpest (H)	FW	(Hungary) Barna Tóth		Yes	Yes	Yes		

(s) Substitute

==== Goal of the Round ====
Goal of the Round of Nemzeti Bajnokság by the M4 Sport website.

Keys

- Score – The score at the time of the goal. Paksi FC's score listed first.
- Final score – The score at full time; Paksi FC's listed first.

Round	Pos.	Player	Placement	Score	Final score	Opponent	Date	Ref.

=== Yearly awards ===
==== Rangadó Award Ceremony (Rangadó Gála) ====
Award	Manager or Player or Team	Result	Ref.
2025 Top Scorer	(Hungary) Dániel Böde	Won	
2025 Manager of the Year	(Hungary) György Bognár	Won	
2025 Fair Play Award	(Hungary) Paksi FC	Won	

==== HLSZ Cup ====
Award	Manager or Player	Result	Ref.
2024 Best Goalkeeper of the Year	(Hungary) Péter Szappanos	Nominated	
2024 Best Coach of the Year	(Hungary) György Bognár	Won	

==== Best U21 Players Worldwide ====
This report presents the players from 65 leagues born in 2004 or later who performed the best during the ongoing season or the one just completed for leagues organised over the calendar year. The rankings were established according to a performance index on a 100-basis considering players’ activity in six areas of the game: ground defence, aerial play, distribution, chance creation, take on and finishing. Goalkeepers and centre forwards were divided into two categories, centre backs int three, full/wing backs and wingers into four, and midfielders into five. Scouting report by CIES Football Observatory.

Category	#	Player	Score
Long-passes Goalkeepers	13th	(Hungary) Barnabás Simon	51.2

== Milestones ==
Keys
Final score	The score at full time; Paksi FC's listed first.	No.	Squad number	Pos.	Position
Opponent	The opponent team without a flag is Hungarian.	(N)	The game was played at a neutral site.		
(H)	Paksi FC were the home team.	(A)	Paksi FC were the away team.		
Player^{*}	Player who joined Paksi FC permanently or on loan during the season				
Player^{†}	Player who departed Paksi FC permanently or on loan during the season				

Debuts

The following players made their competitive debuts for Paksi FC's first team during the campaign.

Date	No.	Pos.	Player	Age	Final score	Opponent	Competition	Ref.
7 August 2024	17	MF	(Hungary) Bence Kocsis	23	3–0	Mornar Bar (A)	UEFA Conference League, Round 3	
10 August 2024	18	MF	(Hungary) Gergő Gyurkits	22	L	Zalaegerszeg (A)	Nemzeti Bajnokság I, Round 3	
22 September 2024	28	MF	(Hungary) Dominik Földi	20	L	Győr (A)	Nemzeti Bajnokság I, Round 7	
29 September 2024	6	DF	(Hungary) Milán Győrfi	17	2–1	Fehérvár (A)	Nemzeti Bajnokság I, Round 8	
29 September 2024	17	FW	(Hungary) Roland Varga	34	2–1	Fehérvár (A)	Nemzeti Bajnokság I, Round 8	
5 April 2025	27	FW	(Hungary) János Galambos	17	2–0	Nyíregyháza (H)	Nemzeti Bajnokság I, Round 26	

50th appearances

The following players made their 50th appearances for Paksi FC's first team during the campaign.

Date	No.	Pos.	Player	Age	Final score	Opponent	Competition	Ref.

100th appearances

The following players made their 100th appearances in the Nemzeti Bajnokság (Hungarian domestic league).

Date	No.	Pos.	Player	Age	Final score	Opponent	Competition	Ref.
7 December 2024	14	MF	(Hungary) Erik Silye	28	4–2	MTK (H)	Nemzeti Bajnokság, Round 16	

200th appearances

The following players made their 200th appearances in the Nemzeti Bajnokság (Hungarian domestic league).

Date	No.	Pos.	Player	Age	Final score	Opponent	Competition	Ref.
8 March 2025	11	DF	(Hungary) Attila Osváth	29	2–0	Diósgyőr (A)	Nemzeti Bajnokság, Round 23	

250th appearances

The following players made their 250th appearances in the Nemzeti Bajnokság (Hungarian domestic league).

Date	No.	Pos.	Player	Age	Final score	Opponent	Competition	Ref.
27 October 2024	17	FW	(Hungary) Roland Varga	34	1–0	Kecskemét (H)	Nemzeti Bajnokság, Round 11	

300th appearances

The following players made their 300th appearances in the Nemzeti Bajnokság (Hungarian domestic league).

Date	No.	Pos.	Player	Age	Final score	Opponent	Competition	Ref.
1 February 2025	15	FW	(Hungary) Norbert Könyves	35	1–1	Győr (H)	Nemzeti Bajnokság, Round 18	

First goals

The following players scored their first goals for Paksi FC's first team during the campaign.

Keys

- Score – The score at the time of the goal. Paksi FC's score listed first.
- Final score – The score at full time; Paksi FC's listed first.

Date	No.	Pos.	Player	Age	Score	Final score	Opponent	Competition	Ref.
6 October 2024	29	FW	(Hungary) Barna Tóth	29	3–1	3–1	Ferencváros (H)	Nemzeti Bajnokság, Round 9	

150th goals

The following players scored their 150th goals in the Nemzeti Bajnokság (Hungarian domestic league).

Keys

- Score – The score at the time of the goal. Paksi FC's score listed first.
- Final score – The score at full time; Paksi FC's listed first.

Date	No.	Pos.	Player	Age	Score	Final score	Opponent	Competition	Ref.
3 November 2024	13	FW	(Hungary) Dániel Böde	38	1–1	L	Diósgyőr (H)	Nemzeti Bajnokság, Round 12	
