= Barna Tóth =

Hungarian footballer (born 1995)

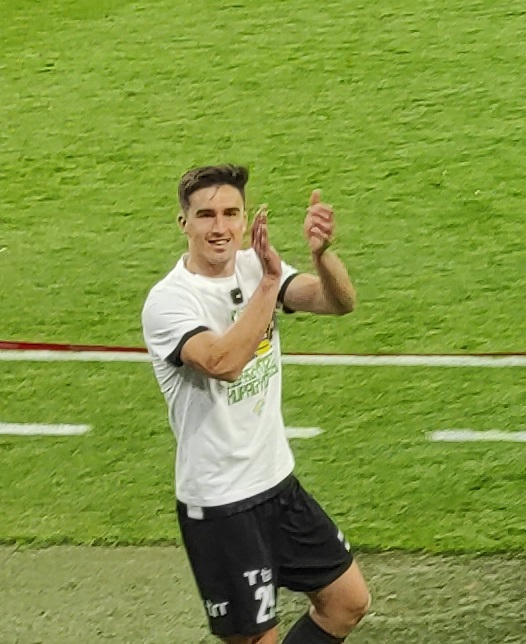
- Tóth with Paks in 2025

Personal information
- Date of birth: 13 March 1995 (age 31)
- Place of birth: Budapest, Hungary
- Position: Forward

Team information
- Current team: Paks
- Number: 29

Youth career
- Ujpest
- Budapest Honvéd FC

Senior career*
Years	Team	Apps	(Gls)
2015-2018	Honvéd	0	(0)
2016	→ Vác (loan)	12	(1)
2017	→ Siófok (loan)	7	(0)
2018-2019	Monor	37	(14)
2019-2020	Nyíregyháza Spartacus	15	(3)
2020-2021	Haladás	23	(7)
2021	Ajka	14	(3)
2021-2024	Kecskemét	81	(18)
2024–	Paks	67	(18)

International career^{‡}
2025–	Hungary	1	(0)
- * Club domestic league appearances and goals as of 27 May 2026 ‡ National team caps and goals as of 6 September 2025

Barna Tóth (born 13 March 1995) is a Hungarian professional footballer who plays as a forward for Nemzeti Bajnokság club Paks and the Hungary national team.

== Club career ==
Tóth joined Újpest FC's youth team at the age of 15 years-old, but did not progress beyond their U21 team, and was transferred to city rivals Honvéd in 2015. He was loaned to Vác FC and BFC Siófok, before he joined Monori SE in 2018 as a free agent.

He appeared in NBII for Monori SE, who were promoted to the NB as champions, and was the team's top scorer with 14 goals, but the club still finished last, falling back to the third tier. He then moved to Nyíregyháza Spartacus FC, where his career took off. In the winter of 2020, Szombathelyi Haladás signed him, from there he moved to FC Ajka, and then played his part in the historic promotion of Kecskeméti TE, contributing to the promotion with ten goals, which won the silver medal as a rookie in the NBII. He made his debut in the NBI with the club, at the age of 27 years-old. He scored six goals in his first season as a Kecskemét player in the NB I.

Tóth Barna joined Paks in January 2024. His performances for Paks included scoring in the UEFA Conference League qualifiers and four goals in a single game against his former club Újpest in March 2025. He scored his club's only goal in regulation time as they drew in the final of the 2024–25 Magyar Kupa 1–1 against Ferencvaros, before winning the cup on a penalty shoot-out.

== International career ==
He was first called up for Hungary against Ireland and Portugal in the 2026 FIFA World Cup qualification (UEFA). He played his first match in the national team against Republic of Ireland on 6 September 2025. Since Barnabás Varga received his second yellow card against Portugal, he was banned from playing against Armenia. Therefore, Marco Rossi, coach of Hungarian national team, looked for a substitution. Tóth also said that he would happy to substitute Varga against Armenia Tóth was called up against Armenia and Portugal on 30 September 2025.

== Career statistics ==
=== Club ===
As of match played 29 August 2025

Appearances and goals by club, season and competition
Club	Season	League			Magyar Kupa		Europe		Total	
Club	Season	Division	Apps	Goals	Apps	Goals	Apps	Goals	Apps	Goals
Honvéd	2014–15	Nemzeti Bajnokság I	0	0	0	0	—		0	0
Vác (loan)	2017–18	Nemzeti Bajnokság II	7	1	2	1	—		9	2
Monori	2018–19	Nemzeti Bajnokság II	38	14	—		—		38	14
Nyíregyháza Spartacus	2019–20	Nemzeti Bajnokság II	15	3	1	1	—		16	4
Szombathelyi Haladás	2019–20	Nemzeti Bajnokság II	4	2	1	1	—		5	3
Szombathelyi Haladás	2020–21	Nemzeti Bajnokság II	18	5	1	1	—		19	6
Szombathelyi Haladás	Total		22	7	2	2	—		24	9
Ajka	2020–21	Nemzeti Bajnokság II	14	3	1	0	—		15	3
Kecskeméti	2021–22	Nemzeti Bajnokság I	36	10	1	0	—		37	10
Kecskeméti	2022–23	Nemzeti Bajnokság I	31	6	2	2	—		33	8
Kecskeméti	2023–24	Nemzeti Bajnokság I	15	2	2	0	2 (Note: Appearances in UEFA Conference League)	0	19	2
Kecskeméti	Total		82	18	5	2	2	0	89	20
Paks	2023–24	Nemzeti Bajnokság I	10	0	2	1	—		12	1
Paks	2024–25	Nemzeti Bajnokság I	10	0	2	1	—		12	1
Paks	2025–26	Nemzeti Bajnokság I	5	3	0	0	6 (Note: Two appearances in UEFA Europa League, four appearances and one goal in UEFA Conference League)	1	11	4
Paks	Total		25	3	4	2	6	1	35	6
Career total			193	49	13	7	8	1	214	54

=== International ===
As of match played 6 September 2025

Appearances and goals by national team and year
National team	Year	Apps	Goals
Hungary	2025	1	0
Total		1	0
