= Krisztián Kovács =

Hungarian footballer (born 2000)

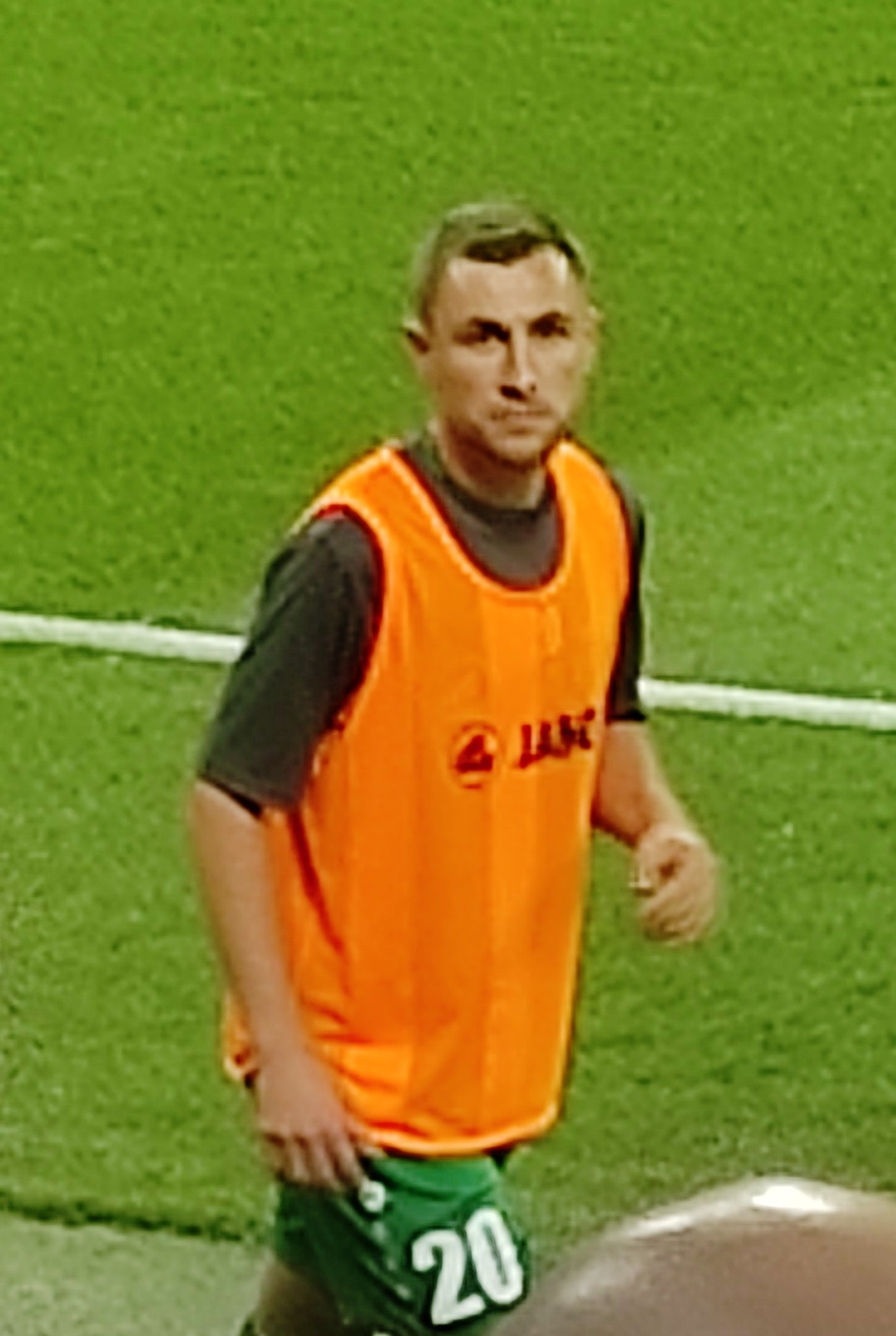
- Kovács with Paks in 2024

Personal information
- Date of birth: 29 May 2000 (age 26)
- Place of birth: Komárno, Slovakia
- Height: 1.75 m (5 ft 9 in)
- Position: Right back

Team information
- Current team: Videoton Fehérvár
- Number: 90

Youth career
- 2009–2017: Győr

Senior career*
Years	Team	Apps	(Gls)
2016–2023	Győr	191	(5)
2021–2023	Győr II	3	(0)
2023–2025	Paks	36	(1)
2024–2025	Paks II	1	(0)
2025	→ Nyíregyháza (loan)	9	(0)
2025–	Videoton Fehérvár	25	(1)

International career^{‡}
2015	Hungary U15	2	(0)
2015–2016	Hungary U16	10	(0)
2016–2017	Hungary U17	16	(0)
2018	Hungary U18	8	(0)
2018–2019	Hungary U19	12	(0)
2019	Hungary U21	2	(0)
- * Club domestic league appearances and goals as of 31 May 2026 ‡ National team caps and goals as of 14 November 2019

Krisztián Kovács (born 29 May 2000) is a Hungarian professional footballer who plays as a defender for Nemzeti Bajnokság II club Videoton Fehérvár.

== Career ==
=== Paks ===
On 15 May 2024, he won the 2024 Magyar Kupa Final with Paks by beating Ferencváros 2–0 at the Puskás Aréna.

== Career statistics ==
As of match played 7 December 2024

Appearances and goals by club, season and competition
Club	Season	League			National cup (Note: Includes Magyar Kupa)		Europe		Other		Total	
Club	Season	Division	Apps	Goals	Apps	Goals	Apps	Goals	Apps	Goals	Apps	Goals
Győr	2016–17	Nemzeti Bajnokság III	1	0	1	0	—		—		2	0
Győr	2017–18	Nemzeti Bajnokság II	29	1	3	0	—		—		32	1
Győr	2018–19	Nemzeti Bajnokság II	36	1	0	0	—		—		36	1
Győr	2019–20	Nemzeti Bajnokság II	26	1	1	0	—		—		27	1
Győr	2020–21	Nemzeti Bajnokság II	33	0	1	0	—		—		34	0
Győr	2021–22	Nemzeti Bajnokság II	35	0	2	0	—		—		37	0
Győr	2022–23	Nemzeti Bajnokság II	31	2	3	1	—		—		34	3
Győr	Total		191	5	11	1	—		—		202	6
Győr II	2020–21	Megyei Bajnokság I	3	0	—		—		2 (Note: Appearances in Megyei Bajnokság I Promotion play-offs)	0	5	0
Paks	2023–24	Nemzeti Bajnokság I	29	1	4	1	—		—		33	2
Paks	2024–25	Nemzeti Bajnokság I	7	0	2	0	4 (Note: One appearance in UEFA Europa League, three appearances in UEFA Conference League)	0	—		13	0
Paks	Total		36	1	6	1	4	0	—		46	2
Paks II	2024–25	Nemzeti Bajnokság III	1	0	—		—		—		1	0
Career total			231	6	17	2	4	0	2	0	254	8
