= Bence Ötvös =

Hungarian footballer

Personal information
- Full name: Bence Ötvös
- Date of birth: 13 March 1998 (age 28)
- Place of birth: Nyíregyháza, Hungary
- Height: 1.82 m (6 ft 0 in)
- Position: Attacking midfielder

Team information
- Current team: Ferencváros
- Number: 23

Youth career
- 2008–2016: Nyíregyháza

Senior career*
Years	Team	Apps	(Gls)
2016–2021	Nyíregyháza	77	(9)
2017–2018	→ Cigánd (loan)	15	(4)
2021	→ Kisvárda (loan)	14	(1)
2021–2024	Kisvárda	86	(2)
2024–2025	Paks	32	(8)
2025–	Ferencváros	19	(3)

International career^{‡}
2025–	Hungary	3	(0)
- * Club domestic league appearances and goals as of 30 May 2026 ‡ National team caps and goals as of 16 November 2025

Bence Ötvös (born 13 March 1998) is a Hungarian professional footballer who plays for Ferencváros and the Hungary national team.

== Club career ==
=== Paks ===
On 14 May 2025, he won the 2025 Magyar Kupa final with Paksi FC after beating Ferencvárosi TC 4–3 on penalty shoot-out.

=== Ferencváros ===
On 2 June 2025, he was signed by Ferencvárosi TC. He debuted in Ferencváros in a 1–1 draw against MTK Budapest FC in the 2025–26 Nemzeti Bajnokság I season. He played in the role of left back.

On 4 December 2025, he scored his first goal in a 1–0 victory over Kisvárda FC at the Várkerti Stadion, Kisvárda.

On 11 December 2025, he scored his first international goal in a 2–1 victory over Rangers F.C. in the 2025–26 UEFA Europa League season at the Groupama Arena. On 9 May 2026, he won the 2025–26 Magyar Kupa season with Ferencváros by beating Zalaegerszegi TE 1–0 in the 2026 Magyar Kupa final at Puskás Aréna.

== International career ==
He was called up for Hungary for the 2026 FIFA World Cup qualifiers against the Republic of Ireland and Portugal on 26 August 2025.

== Career statistics ==
=== Club ===
As of match played 9 November 2025

Appearances and goals by club, season and competition
Club	Season	League			Magyar Kupa		Europe		Total	
Club	Season	Division	Apps	Goals	Apps	Goals	Apps	Goals	Apps	Goals
Nyíregyháza	2016–17	Nemzeti Bajnokság II	3	0	1	1	—		4	1
Nyíregyháza	2017–18	Nemzeti Bajnokság II	10	0	0	0	—		10	0
Nyíregyháza	2018–19	Nemzeti Bajnokság II	26	1	0	0	—		26	1
Nyíregyháza	2019–20	Nemzeti Bajnokság II	21	3	2	0	—		23	3
Nyíregyháza	2020–21	Nemzeti Bajnokság II	17	5	2	3	—		19	8
Nyíregyháza	Total		77	9	5	4	—		82	13
Cigánd (loan)	2017–18	Nemzeti Bajnokság III	15	4	3	0	—		18	4
Kisvárda (loan)	2020–21	Nemzeti Bajnokság I	14	1	3	1	—		17	2
Kisvárda	2021–22	Nemzeti Bajnokság I	30	0	1	0	—		31	0
Kisvárda	2022–23	Nemzeti Bajnokság I	27	2	1	0	3 (Note: Appearances in UEFA Europa Conference League)	0	31	2
Kisvárda	2023–24	Nemzeti Bajnokság I	29	0	3	0	—		32	0
Kisvárda	Total		86	2	5	0	3	0	94	2
Paksi	2024–25	Nemzeti Bajnokság I	22	7	1	3	7 (Note: One appearance in UEFA Europa League, six appearances and one goal in UEFA Conference League)	1	30	11
Ferencváros	2025–26	Nemzeti Bajnokság I	10	0	1	0	10 (Note: Six appearances in UEFA Champions League, four appearances in UEFA Europa League)	0	21	0
Career total			224	23	18	8	20	1	262	32

=== International ===
As of match played 16 November 2025

Appearances and goals by national team and year
National team	Year	Apps	Goals
Hungary	2025	3	0
Total		3	0

== Honours ==
=== Individual ===
- Nemzeti Bajnokság I Player of the Month: October 2024
