= Szabolcs Mezei =

Hungarian footballer

Personal information
- Date of birth: 18 October 2000 (age 26)
- Place of birth: Békéscsaba, Hungary
- Height: 1.72 m (5 ft 8 in)
- Position: Midfielder

Team information
- Current team: TSC
- Number: 26

Youth career
- 2008–2015: Békéscsaba
- 2015–2018: MTK Budapest

Senior career*
Years	Team	Apps	(Gls)
2018–2023	MTK Budapest	94	(3)
2018	→ MTK Budapest II	5	(1)
2018–2019	→ Békéscsaba (loan)	36	(1)
2023–2025	Paks	53	(7)
2025–	TSC	28	(1)

International career^{‡}
2016	Hungary U-17	1	(0)
2017	Hungary U-18	3	(0)
2019	Hungary U-19	1	(0)
2020–	Hungary U-21	5	(0)
- * Club domestic league appearances and goals as of 13 June 2026 ‡ National team caps and goals as of 23 October 2021

Szabolcs Mezei (born 27 September 2000) is a Hungarian football player who plays as a midfielder for TSC in Serbian SuperLiga.

== Career ==
=== Paks ===
On 15 May 2024, he won the 2024 Magyar Kupa Final with Paks by beating Ferencváros 2–0 at the Puskás Aréna.

On 14 May 2025, he won the 2025 Magyar Kupa final with Paksi FC after beating Ferencvárosi TC 4–3 on penalty shoot-out.

== Career statistics ==
As of 15 May 2021.

Appearances and goals by club, season and competition
Club	Season	League			Cup		Continental		Other		Total	
Club	Season	Division	Apps	Goals	Apps	Goals	Apps	Goals	Apps	Goals	Apps	Goals
MTK Budapest II	2017–18	Nemzeti Bajnokság III	5	1	—		—		0	0	5	1
MTK Budapest II	Total		5	1	0	0	0	0	0	0	5	1
Békéscsaba	2018–19	Nemzeti Bajnokság II	36	1	2	0	—		0	0	38	1
Békéscsaba	Total		36	1	2	0	0	0	0	0	38	1
MTK Budapest	2019–20	Nemzeti Bajnokság II	24	0	8	0	—		0	0	32	0
MTK Budapest	2020–21	Nemzeti Bajnokság I	26	1	5	2	—		0	0	31	3
MTK Budapest	Total		50	1	13	2	0	0	0	0	63	3
Career total			91	3	15	2	0	0	0	0	106	5
