= 2026–27 Paksi FC season =

Paks
2026–27 season
- CEO: Zsolt Haraszti
- Manager: György Bognár
- Stadium: Fehérvári úti Stadion
- Nemzeti Bajnokság I: 5th
- Magyar Kupa: Round of 16
- UEFA Conference League: Second qualifying round
- Top goalscorer: League: Pető and Szalai with 7 goals each All: Pető and Szalai with 8 goals each
- Highest home attendance: 4,739; 4–2 v Ferencváros, (26 July 2026, Nemzeti Bajnokság I, Round 1)
- Lowest home attendance: 2,274; 2–1 v Zalaegerszeg, (7 November 2026, Nemzeti Bajnokság I, Round 13)
- Average home league attendance: 3,367
- Biggest win: 2 goals 4–2 v Ferencváros, (Home, 26 July 2026, Nemzeti Bajnokság I, Round 1); 2–0 v Újpest, (Home, 21 August 2026, Nemzeti Bajnokság I, Round 5)
- Biggest defeat: 3 goals 2–5 v Zalaegerszeg, (Away, 3 August 2026, Nemzeti Bajnokság I, Round 2)
- All statistics correct as of 22 November 2026.

The 2026–27 season is Paksi Futball Club's 74rd competitive season and the club's 13th consecutive season in the Nemzeti Bajnokság I. In addition to the domestic league, Paks participates in Magyar Kupa and UEFA Conference League after finishing third place in Nemzeti Bajnokság I (domestic league) last season.

UEFA Conference League

Paks started the UEFA Conference League qualification in second qualifying round, they lost 4–3 on aggregate to 4th placed team of Super League Greece Panathinaikos and this year's international cup series ended for them.

== Kits ==
Supplier: Nike / Sponsor: Tippmix

Home	Away	Away alt.

Goalkeeper 1	Goalkeeper 2	Goalkeeper 3

== First team squad ==
As of 28 August 2026
Injured player

Note: Flags indicate national team as defined under FIFA eligibility rules; some limited exceptions apply. Players may hold more than one non-FIFA nationality.

No.	Pos.	Nation	Player
1	GK	HUN	Ádám Kovácsik
2	DF	HUN	Ákos Kinyik
3	DF	HUN	Ákos Debreceni
4	MF	HUN	Andor Lapu
5	MF	HUN	Bálint Vécsei
6	DF	HUN	Milán Győrfi
7	FW	HUN	József Szalai
8	MF	HUN	Balázs Balogh
9	FW	HUN	János Hahn
10	FW	HUN	Zsolt Haraszti
11	DF	HUN	Hunor Kuzma
12	DF	HUN	Gábor Vas
13	FW	HUN	Dániel Böde
14	DF	HUN	Erik Silye
15	DF	HUN	Csaba Belényesi (on loan from (Hungary) MTK)
16	FW	HUN	Balázs Wiesner

No.	Pos.	Nation	Player
17	MF	HUN	Milán Pető
18	MF	HUN	Gergő Gyurkits
19	MF	HUN	Kevin Horváth
20	DF	HUN	Mario Simuț
21	MF	HUN	Kristóf Papp
22	MF	HUN	József Windecker (vice-captain)
23	MF	HUN	Csaba Máté
24	DF	HUN	Bence Lenzsér
25	GK	HUN	Gergő Rácz
26	DF	HUN	Milán Szekszárdi
27	FW	HUN	János Galambos
28	GK	HUN	Márk Gyetván
29	FW	HUN	Barna Tóth
30	DF	HUN	János Szabó (captain)
—	DF	HUN	Zsombor Bévárdi

== Transfers ==
=== Summer ===
In
Date	No.	Pos.	Nat.	Player	Moving from	Division	Ref.
30 June 2026	25	GK	Hungary	Gergő Rácz	Kispest-Honvéd	Nemzeti Bajnokság II	
3 July 2026	11	DF	Hungary	Hunor Kuzma	Békéscsaba	Nemzeti Bajnokság II	
28 August 2026	TBD	DF	Hungary	Mario Simut	Videoton	Nemzeti Bajnokság II	

Loaned from
Date	No.	Pos.	Nat.	Player	Loaned from	Division	Ref.
24 August 2026	15	DF	Hungary	Csaba Belényesi	MTK	Nemzeti Bajnokság I	

Return from loan
Date	No.	Pos.	Nat.	Player	Moving from	Division	Ref.
30 June 2026	15	DF	Hungary	Ákos Debreczeni	Kecskemét	Nemzeti Bajnokság II	
30 June 2026	6	DF	Hungary	Milán Győrfi	Kecskemét	Nemzeti Bajnokság II	
30 June 2026	10	FW	Hungary	Zsolt Haraszti	Videoton Fehérvár	Nemzeti Bajnokság II	
30 June 2026		MF	Hungary	Bálint Rideg	Videoton Fehérvár	Nemzeti Bajnokság II	
30 June 2026		FW	Hungary	József Szalai	Mezőkövesd	Nemzeti Bajnokság II	
30 June 2026		MF	Hungary	Milán Pető	Diósgyőr	Nemzeti Bajnokság I	

Return after loan expired
Date	No.	Pos.	Nat.	Player	Moving to	Division	Ref.
30 June 2026	15	DF	Hungary	Áron Alaxai	Nyíregyháza	Nemzeti Bajnokság I	

Out
Date	No.	Pos.	Nat.	Player	Moving to	Division	Ref.
30 June 2026	7	FW	Hungary	Martin Ádám	TBD		
30 June 2026	17	MF	Hungary	Kristóf Hinora	MTK	Nemzeti Bajnokság I	
30 June 2026	25	GK	Hungary	Barnabás Simon	Ajka	Nemzeti Bajnokság II	
30 June 2026	N/A	DF	Hungary	Olivér Tamás	Haladás	Nemzeti Bajnokság II	
20 July 2026	15	FW	Hungary	Ákos Szendrei	Debrecen	Nemzeti Bajnokság I	
28 August 2026	20	DF	Hungary	Márió Zeke	Újpest	Nemzeti Bajnokság I	

== Friendlies ==
=== Pre-season ===
Paksi FC will start the preparation for the 2026/27 season at 15 June, 2026.

20 June 2026 Friendly	Kelen (MB I)	1–10	Paks	Budapest
11:00 CEST (UTC+02:00)	Elek 37'	Report	Á. Szendrei 14', 25', 43'; J. Szalai 21', 36'; Debreceni 41'; Galambos 51'; Pesti 77', 88'; Ke. Horváth 83'	Stadium: Kelen SC Sporttelep
Note: • Paks 1st half: Rácz — Győrfi, Kuzma, Vas, Debreceni, Lapu — Ke. Horváth, Pető — Haraszti, J. Szalai, Á. Szendrei • Paks 2nd half: Gyetván — Bévárdi, M. Szekszárdi, Kuzma, Éger, Zeke — K. Tóth, Máté, Pető — Pesti, Galambos • Manager: György Bognár

24 June 2026 Friendly	Paks	3–3	Szentlőrinc (NB II)	Paks
15:00 CEST (UTC+02:00)	B. Tóth 15', 22'; M. Szekszárdi 53'	Report	B. Kocsis 27'; Milovanovic 35'; Czérna 37'	Stadium: Training Center of Paksi FC
Note: • Paks 1st half: Rácz — Bévárdi, Papp, J. Szabó, Debreceni, Silye — Windecker, Máté — Hahn, B. Tóth, Á. Szendrei • Paks 2nd half: Gyetván — Győrfi, M. Szekszárdi, Vas, Zeke, Lapu — Ke. Horváth, Pető — Haraszti, J. Szalai, Galambos • Manager: György Bognár

27 June 2026 Friendly	Paks	4–1	(Slovakia) Komárno (Slovak I)	Paks
11:00 CEST (UTC+02:00)	Hahn 26'; Pető 28'; B. Tóth 60', 85'	Report	Vojtko 10'	Stadium: Training Center of Paksi FC
Note: • Paks 1st half: Kovácsik — Bévárdi, Lenzsér, Vas, Vécsei, Zeke — Ke. Horváth, Papp, Pető — Hahn, J. Szalai • Paks 2nd half: Kovácsik — Á. Szendrei, M. Szekszárdi, J. Szabó, Debreceni, Silye — Windecker, Balogh, Haraszti — Böde, B. Tóth • Manager: György Bognár

2 July 2026 Friendly	Dundee (Scottish I) (Scotland)	2–1	Paks	Telki
17:00 CEST (UTC+02:00)	Hay 45'; Bland 63'	Report	Ke. Horváth 70'	Stadium: Globall Football Park; Attendance: 0 (behind closed doors)
Note: • Paks until 60th minutes: Gyetván — Győrfi, M. Szekszárdi, J. Szabó (Zeke (substituted on) 40'), Lapu (Debreceni (substituted on) 30'), Silye (Vas (substituted on) 45') — Windecker (Ke. Horváth (substituted on) 45'), Balogh, Haraszti — B. Tóth, Böde • Paks from 61st minutes: Rácz — Á. Szendrei, Lenzsér, Vas, Vécsei, Zeke — Papp, Pető, Ke. Horváth — J. Szalai, Hahn • Manager: György Bognár

4 July 2026 Friendly	Osijek (Croatian I) (Croatia)	0–4	Paks	Osijek, Croatia
19:00 CEST (UTC+02:00)		Report	Lapu 42'; B. Tóth 79', 88'; Debreceni 86'	Stadium: Opus Arena; Attendance: 0 (behind closed doors)
Note: • Paks until 60th minutes: Kovácsik — Silye, Lenzsér, Vas, Zeke, Lapu — Papp, Ke. Horváth, Pető — Á. Szendrei (Hahn (substituted on) 45'), J. Szalai • Paks from 61st minutes: Kovácsik — Győrfi, Kuzma, M. Szekszárdi, Debreceni, Hahn — Windecker, Balogh, Haraszti — Böde, B. Tóth • Manager: György Bognár

8 July 2026 Friendly	Maccabi Haifa (Israeli I) (Israel)	3–3	Paks	Telki
17:00 CEST (UTC+02:00)	Don 23'; Mordechai 55'; Silva 83'	Report	Pető 32'; Hahn 36'; Haraszti 90'	Stadium: Globall Football Park
Note: • Paks until 60th minutes: Kovácsik — Silye, Kuzma, Vas (M. Szekszárdi (substituted on) 46'), Vécsei, Zeke — Windecker, Papp — Pető, Hahn — J. Szalai • Paks from 61st minutes: Gyetván — Győrfi, Debreceni, M. Szekszárdi, Lapu, Á. Szendrei — Ke. Horváth, Balogh — Haraszti, Böde — B. Tóth • Manager: György Bognár

11 July 2026 Friendly	Paks	0–3	Kozármisleny (NB II)	Paks
11:00 CEST (UTC+02:00)		Report	Szűcs 14'; Zamostny 17'; Herczeg 90'	Stadium: Training Center of Paksi FC
Note: • Paks 1st half: Gyetván — Győrfi, Kuzma, M. Szekszárdi, Debreceni, Lapu — Ke. Horváth, Balogh, Haraszti — Á. Szendrei, B. Tóth • Paks 2nd half: Gyetván (Rácz (substituted on) 70') — Silye, Windecker, Vas, Vécsei, Zeke — Pető, Gyurkits, Wiesner — Hahn (Győrfi (substituted on) 80'), J. Szalai • Manager: György Bognár

Summer Training Camp in Stubenberg am See, Austria – from 12 July until 19 July, 2026.

14 July 2026 Friendly	Hapoel Ramat Gan (Israeli I) (Israel)	0–4	Paks	Stubenberg am See, Austria
19:00 CEST (UTC+02:00)		Report	Haraszti 30', 42'; J. Szalai 50'; B. Tóth 70'
Note: • Paks: Kovácsik — Silye (Kuzma (substituted on) 72'), M. Szekszárdi (J. Szabó (substituted on) 72'), Vas (Lenzsér (substituted on) 60'), Vécsei, Zeke (Győrfi (substituted on) 72') — Windecker (Gyurkits (substituted on) 72'), Ke. Horváth (Balogh (substituted on) 60') — Papp (Á. Szendrei (substituted on) 72'), Haraszti (Böde (substituted on) 60') — J. Szalai (B. Tóth (substituted on) 60') • Manager: György Bognár

16 July 2026 Friendly	Slaven Belupo (Croatian I) (Croatia)	3–5	Paks	Stubenberg am See, Austria
17:30 CEST (UTC+02:00)	Balogh 15' (o.g.); Mitrović 65'; Bošnjak 83' (pen.)	Report	B. Tóth 11', 45+2'; Gyurkits 17' (pen.), 70' (pen.); Wiesner 74'
Note: • Paks: Gyetván (Rácz (substituted on) 57') — Győrfi, Kuzma, J. Szabó, Lenzsér (Debreceni (substituted on) 46'), Lapu (M. Szekszárdi (substituted on) 46') — Gyurkits, Balogh, Pető (Wiesner (substituted on) 57') — B. Tóth (Hahn (substituted on) 46'), Á. Szendrei (Böde (substituted on) 57') • Manager: György Bognár

17 July 2026 Friendly	Austria Wien (Austrian I)	4–1	Paks	Vienna, Austria
20:00 CEST (UTC+02:00)	Šaljić 16'; Fischer 52'; Wels 65'; Hettwer 67'	Report	Silye 53'	Stadium: Generali Arena; Attendance: 883; Referee: Stauber
Note: • Paks: Kovácsik — Silye (Á. Szendrei (substituted on) 85'), M. Szekszárdi (Lenzsér (substituted on) 60'), Vas, Vécsei, Zeke — Windecker, Papp, Ke. Horváth (Pető (substituted on) 46') — Haraszti (Hahn (substituted on) 46') — J. Szalai (Böde (substituted on) 60') • Manager: György Bognár

Source of fixtures: Soccerway.

=== Mid-season ===
3 October 2026 Friendly	Paks	0–2	Szentlőrinc (NB II)	Paks
11:00 CEST (UTC+02:00)		Report	Oláh 64'; Gruber 78'	Stadium: Fehérvári úti Stadion; Referee: Attila Molnár
Note: • Paks: Kovácsik (Gyetván (substituted on) 46') — Simut, Lenzsér (Kovács (substituted on) 9'), Vas, Belényesi, Debreceni — Balogh, Gyurkits, Silye, Haraszti (Győrfi (substituted on) 73') — Windecker • Manager: György Bognár

13 November 2026 Friendly	Paks	5–1	Tiszakécske (NB III)	Paks
11:00 CET (UTC+01:00)	Hahn 29'; Gyurkits 50'; J. Szalai 80', 85'; Ke. Horváth 90'	Report	Kócs-Washburn 88'	Stadium: Fehérvári úti Stadion
Note: • Paks 1st half: Kovácsik — Simut, Vas, Belényesi, Debreceni, Lapu — Bogdán, Balogh, Gyurkits, Bartha — Hahn • Paks 2nd half: Kovácsik (Rácz (substituted on) 60') — Bukta, Kuzma, Kinyik, Lenzsér, Silye — Ke. Horváth, Papp, Windecker, Gyurkits — J. Szalai • Manager: György Bognár

== Competitions ==
=== Overall record ===
In italics, we indicate the Last match and the Final position achieved in competition(s) that have not yet been completed.

Competition	First match	Last match	Starting round	Final position	Record							
Competition	First match	Last match	Starting round	Final position	Pld	W	D	L	GF	GA	GD	Win %
Nemzeti Bajnokság I	26 July 2026	22 November 2026	Matchday 1	5th	14	7	2	5	25	24	+1	50.00
Magyar Kupa	12 September 2026	28 October 2026	Round of 64	Round of 16	2	2	0	0	4	2	+2	100.00
UEFA Conference League	23 July 2026	30 July 2026	Second qualifying round	Second qualifying round	2	0	1	1	3	4	−1	0.00
Total					18	9	3	6	32	30	+2	50.00

Last updated: 22 November 2026
Source: Soccerway

=== Nemzeti Bajnokság I ===
==== League table ====
Pos	Team	Pld	W	D	L	GF	GA	GD	Pts	Qualification or relegation
3	Puskás Akadémia	14	8	0	6	19	17	+2	24	Qualification for the Conference League second qualifying round
4	Ferencváros	13	6	5	2	23	13	+10	23	
5	Paks	14	6	2	6	25	24	+1	20	
6	Újpest	14	5	4	5	21	20	+1	19	
7	Vasas	14	4	5	5	20	19	+1	17	

Updated to match(es) played on 22 November 2026, Round 14 (6 and 6 matches). Source: Hungarian Football Federation (in Hungarian)
Rules for classification: 1) Points; 2) Matches won; 3) Goal difference; 4) Goals scored (GF); 5) Head-to-head points; 6) Head-to-head goal difference; 7) Fair play ranking; 8) Drawing of lots.

==== Results summary ====
Overall								Home						Away					
Pld	W	D	L	GF	GA	GD	Pts	W	D	L	GF	GA	GD	W	D	L	GF	GA	GD
14	6	2	6	25	24	+1	20	4	1	2	16	11	+5	2	1	4	9	13	−4

Last updated: 22 November 2026.
Source: Soccerway

==== Results by round ====
A = Away; H = Home; W = Win; D = Draw; L = Loss

Round	1	2	3	4	5	6	7	8	9	10	11	12	13	14	15	16	17	18	19	20	21	22	23	24	25	26	27	28	29	30	31	32	33
Ground	H	A	H	A	H	A	H	A	H	H	A	A	H	A	H	A	H	A	H	A	A	H	H	A	H	A	H	A	H	A	H	H	A
Result	W	L	D	L	W	D	L	W	W	L	W	L	W	L																			
Position	2	7	8	9	7	7	9	6	5	5	3	6	5	5																			
Points	3	3	4	4	7	8	8	11	14	14	17	17	20	20																			
Manager	B	B	B	B	B	B	B	B	B	B	B	B	B	B																			

Updated to match(es) played on 22 November 2026. Source:
Notes:
Manager: • B Bognár

==== Matches ====
Win Draw Loss Fixtures Postponed

The draw for the 2026/27 season was held on 22 June 2026.

26 July 2026 1	Paks	4–2	Ferencváros	Paks
20:00 CEST	Papp (yellow card) 13'; Pető 24', 59'; J. Szalai 42', 55'; Windecker (yellow card) 76'; Győrfi (yellow card) 90+3'	Report	Yusuf 18'; Botka 32'	Stadium: Fehérvári úti Stadion; Attendance: 4,739; Referee: Ferenc Karakó; Assistant referees: Georgiou Theodoros, Péter Ország
Note: • Paks: Kovácsik — Zeke, Vécsei, Vas, M. Szekszárdi, Győrfi — Ke. Horváth (Balogh (substituted on) 75'), Papp, Pető (Hahn (substituted on) 75') — Haraszti (c) (Windecker (substituted on) 62') — J. Szalai (Böde (substituted on) 68') • Manager: György Bognár • Player of the match: József Szalai, Paks 8.6 • Best player of Ferencváros: Gabi Kanichowsky 7.6

3 August 2026 2	Zalaegerszeg	5–2	Paks	Zalaegerszeg
17:30 CEST	Calderón 2', 20'; Garai 45+2'; Peraza (yellow card) 64'; Marques 73'; Santos (yellow card) 78'; Amato (yellow card) 90+7'; Babos 90+9'	Report	J. Szalai 11' (pen.); Lapu 40'; Pető (yellow card) 58'; Lenzsér (yellow card) 68'; Ke. Horváth (yellow card) 90+4'	Stadium: ZTE Arena; Attendance: 3,093; Referee: Péter Zierkelbach; Assistant referees: Zoltán Horváth, Gergely Becséri
Note: • Paks: Kovácsik — Kuzma (Lenzsér (substituted on) 46'), M. Szekszárdi, Vécsei — Hahn, Pető (Böde (substituted on) 62'), Papp, Balogh (Zeke (substituted on) 46'), Lapu (Ke. Horváth (substituted on) 62') — Haraszti (c) (Wiesner (substituted on) 82'), J. Szalai • Manager: György Bognár • Player of the match: Calderón, Zalaegerszeg 9.1 • Best player of Paks: Balázs Balogh 7.0

9 August 2026 3	Paks	2–2	Kispest-Honvéd	Paks
15:30 CEST	Papp (yellow card) 34'; Pető 59'; J. Szalai 79'	Report	Boldor (yellow card) 52'; T. Somogyi 68'; Hangya (yellow card) 84'; Csontos 90' (pen.)	Stadium: Fehérvári úti Stadion; Attendance: 3,792; Referee: Mihály Káprály; Assistant referees: Péter Kóbor, István Szécsényi
Note: • Paks: Kovácsik — Silye (Győrfi (substituted on) 60'), Vas, J. Szabó (c), Zeke, Lapu — Gyurkits (Ke. Horváth (substituted on) 46'), Pető (Böde (substituted on) 75'), Papp — J. Szalai (Windecker (substituted on) 80'), Galambos (Haraszti (substituted on) 46') • Manager: György Bognár

16 August 2026 4	Puskás Akadémia	3–2	Paks	Felcsút
17:30 CEST	D. Lukács 7' (pen.); P. Dárdai 41'; L. Duarte (yellow card) 78'; Colley 90'; Zs. Varga (yellow card) 90+3'	Report	J. Szalai 30'; Windecker 59'	Stadium: Pancho Aréna; Attendance: 1,704; Referee: Ferenc Karakó; Assistant referees: Dániel Szalai, József Aradi
Note: • Paks: Kovácsik — Győrfi, Vas, J. Szabó (c), Zeke, Silye (Lenzsér (substituted on) 46') — Pető (B. Tóth (substituted on) 84'), Papp, Ke. Horváth (Gyurkits (substituted on) 75') — Haraszti (Windecker (substituted on) 46'), J. Szalai • Manager: György Bognár • Player of the match: Palkó Dárdai, Puskás Akadémia 8.0 • Best player of Paks: József Szalai 7.9

21 August 2026 5	Paks	2–0	Újpest	Paks
17:30 CEST	J. Szalai (yellow card) 6' (goal) 36'; Windecker 21'; Hahn (yellow card) 62'; J. Szabó (yellow card) 72'; Zeke (red card) 87'	Report		Stadium: Fehérvári úti Stadion; Attendance: 4,297; Referee: Marcell Derdák; Assistant referees: Georgiou Theodoros, Péter Ország
Note: • Paks: Kovácsik — Győrfi (Szekszárdi (substituted on) 88'), Lenzsér, J. Szabó (c), Lapu (Silye (substituted on) 85') — Papp, Windecker — Hahn (Ke. Horváth (substituted on) 63'), Balogh (Pető (substituted on) 63'), Zeke — J. Szalai • Manager: György Bognár • Player of the match: Márió Zeke, Paks 8.0 • Best player of Újpest: Patrizio Stronati 8.0

29 August 2026 6	Nyíregyháza	1–1	Paks	Nyíregyháza
14:45 CEST	L. Katona (yellow card) 12'; Manner (yellow card) 48'; Batoum 88'; Toma (yellow card) 89'	Report	Haraszti 50'; Windecker (yellow card) 59'; Lenzsér (yellow card) 70'; Ke. Horváth (yellow card) 90+2'	Stadium: Városi Stadion; Attendance: 4,213; Referee: Balázs Berke; Assistant referees: Norbert Bornemissza, Viktor Nagy
Note: • Paks: Kovácsik — Győrfi, Lenzsér, J. Szabó (c), Vécsei, Lapu (Silye (substituted on) 72') — Pető (B. Tóth (substituted on) 46'), Papp, Windecker (Hahn (substituted on) 90'), Haraszti (Ke. Horváth (substituted on) 72') — J. Szalai (Balogh (substituted on) 80') • Manager: György Bognár • Player of the match: Zsolt Haraszti, Paks 7.8 • Best player of Nyíregyháza: Yuriy Toma 7.7

5 September 2026 7	Paks	2–4	Debrecen	Paks
20:00 CEST	Haraszti 24'; B. Tóth 81'; J. Szabó (yellow card) 88'	Report	Á. Szendrei 6', 21'; Guerrero 38'; Vas 72' (o.g.); V. Dénes (yellow card) 89'	Stadium: Fehérvári úti Stadion; Attendance: 2,781; Referee: Mihály Káprály; Assistant referees: István Szécsényi, Gergely Becséri
Note: • Paks: Kovácsik — Győrfi, Vas, Belényesi (B. Tóth (substituted on) 46'), J. Szabó (c), Lapu (Simut (substituted on) 75') — Pető, Papp, Ke. Horváth (Windecker (substituted on) 46'), Haraszti — J. Szalai (Galambos (substituted on) 75') • Manager: György Bognár • Player of the match: Adrián Guerrero, Debrecen 8.0 • Best player of Paks: Zsolt Haraszti 8.0

19 September 2026 8	Kisvárda	0–1	Paks	Kisvárda
17:00 CEST		Report	Lenzsér 71'; Haraszti (yellow card) 82'	Stadium: Várkerti Stadion; Attendance: 1,683; Referee: Márió Zimmermann; Assistant referees: Georgiou Theodoros, Ákos Berényi
Note: • Paks: Gyetván — Lenzsér, Belényesi, Vécsei — Győrfi (Simut (substituted on) 46'), Papp (Ke. Horváth (substituted on) 90'), Pető (Hahn (substituted on) 46'), Balogh, Silye (Lapu (substituted on) 71') — Haraszti (c) (Windecker (substituted on) 83'), J. Szalai • Manager: György Bognár • Player of the match: Bence Lenzsér, Paks 8.7 • Best player of Kisvárda: Bohdan Melnyk 7.2

10 October 2026 9	Paks	3–0	MTK	Paks
19:30 CEST	Balogh (yellow card) 19'; Kinyik 20'; J. Szabó (yellow card) 25'; Ke. Horváth 74'; B. Tóth (yellow card) 75'; Pető 90+1'	Report	Armalas (yellow card) 10'; Szuhodovszki (red card) 87'; Varju (yellow card) 90+4'	Stadium: Fehérvári úti Stadion; Attendance: 2,502; Referee: Imre Kovács; Assistant referees: Balázs Buzás, Norbert Bornemissza
Note: • Paks: Gyetván — Győrfi, Vas, Kinyik, J. Szabó (c), Silye – Papp, Windecker (Gyurkits (substituted on) 89'), Balogh (Ke. Horváth (substituted on) 67'), Haraszti (Pető (substituted on) 71') – J. Szalai (B. Tóth (substituted on) 71') • Manager: György Bognár • Player of the match: Kevin Horváth, Paks 8.2 • Best player of MTK: Gábor Jurek 8.0

17 October 2026 10	Paks	1–2	ETO Győr	Paks
17:00 CEST	Papp (yellow card) 8'; Győrfi (yellow card) 41'; Pető 48'; Wiesner (yellow card) 85'	Report	Ricardo (yellow card) 29'; Đukanović 39', 42'; Petráš (yellow card) 90+2'	Stadium: Fehérvári úti Stadion; Attendance: 3,023; Referee: Márton Rúsz; Assistant referees: Gergely Becséri, Levente Balla
Note: • Paks: Gyetván — Győrfi (Simut (substituted on) 46'), Vas (Wiesner (substituted on) 81'), Kinyik, J. Szabó (c), Silye — Haraszti (J. Szalai (substituted on) 46'), Windecker (Ke. Horváth (substituted on) 46'), Papp, Pető — B. Tóth (Hahn (substituted on) 77') • Manager: György Bognár • Player of the match: Viktor Đukanović, ETO Győr 9.9 • Best player of Paks: Márk Gyetván 7.6

25 October 2026 11	Vasas	0–2	Paks	Budapest
13:15 CET	Girsik (yellow card) 11'; J. Urblík (yellow card) 14'; Hidi M (yellow card) 55'; Kovácsréti (yellow card) 65'; Baráth (yellow card) 76'	Report	Lenzsér (yellow card) 35'; Vécsei 80'; Ke. Horváth 90+3'	Stadium: Illovszky Rudolf Stadion; Attendance: 3,056; Referee: Ferenc Karakó; Assistant referees: Péter Ország, Bálint Juhász
Note: • Paks: Gyetván — Győrfi, Lenzsér, Kinyik, Vécsei, Silye — Pető (Haraszti (substituted on) 79'), Papp, Balogh (c) (B. Tóth (substituted on) 79') — Hahn (Ke. Horváth (substituted on) 60'), J. Szalai (Windecker (substituted on) 86') • Manager: György Bognár • Player of the match: Bálint Vécsei, Paks 7.9 • Best player of Vasas: Márk Engedi 7.3

1 November 2026 12	Ferencváros	2–0	Paks	Budapest
16:00 CET	Yusuf 59' (yellow card) 70'; Zachariassen 90+4'	Report	Lenzsér (yellow card) 49'	Stadium: Groupama Aréna; Attendance: 8,629; Referee: Gergő Bogár; Assistant referees: István Albert, Bence Belicza
Note: • Paks: Gyetván — Győrfi (Wiesner (substituted on) 60'), Lenzsér, Kinyik, Vécsei, Silye — Pető (Gyurkits (substituted on) 80'), Papp, Balogh (c) (Simut (substituted on) 60'), Ke. Horváth (Haraszti (substituted on) 80') — J. Szalai • Manager: György Bognár • Player of the match: Attila Osváth, Ferencváros 8.3 • Best player of Paks: Bence Lenzsér and Ákos Kinyik 7.5 each

7 November 2026 13	Paks	2–1	Zalaegerszeg	Paks
13:30 CET	Pető 4', 86'; Győrfi (yellow card) 82'; Hahn (yellow card) 89'; Kinyik (red card) 90+1'	Report	Peraza (yellow card) 43'; Gundel-Takács (yellow card) 43'; Marlon (yellow card) 50'; Vera 70'; Harangi (yellow card) 73'; B. Kiss (yellow card) 80'; Calderón (yellow card) 85'	Stadium: Fehérvári úti Stadion; Attendance: 2,274; Referee: Marcell Derdák; Assistant referees: Gergely Becséri, Dávid Rózsa
Note: • Paks: Gyetván (Kovácsik (substituted on) 46') — Győrfi, Lenzsér, Kinyik, Vécsei, Silye (Simut (substituted on) 72') — Ke. Horváth (Windecker (substituted on) 46' (substituted off) 79' (Gyurkits (substituted on) 79')), Papp, Haraszti (c) (Hahn (substituted on) 61') — Pető — J. Szalai • Manager: György Bognár • Player of the match: Milán Pető, Paks 9.1 • Best player of Zalaegerszeg: Fernando Vera 8.7

22 November 2026 14	Kispest-Honvéd	2–1	Paks	Budapest
18:30 CET	Kántor (yellow card) 20'; Csontos (yellow card) 21'; Pekár (yellow card) 24'; Á. Szamosi 32'; Alić 73' (yellow card) 73'	Report	Windecker (yellow card) 17'; J. Szalai 44' (pen.); Lenzsér (yellow card) 56'; Gyurkits (yellow card) 59'	Stadium: Bozsik Aréna; Attendance: 2,274; Referee: Márton Rúsz; Assistant referees: Balázs Szert, Péter Ország
Note: • Paks: Kovácsik — Lenzsér, J. Szabó (c), Vécsei — Windecker (Papp (substituted on) 67') — Győrfi, Gyurkits (Haraszti (substituted on) 67'), Balogh (Simut (substituted on) 75'), Lapu (Ke. Horváth (substituted on) 75') — Pető (Hahn (substituted on) 82'), J. Szalai • Manager: György Bognár • Player of the match: Patrik Pinte, Kispest-Honvéd 8.1 • Best player of Paks: Andor Lapu 7.3

29 November 2026 15	Paks	v	Puskás Akadémia	Paks
16:30 CET				Stadium: Fehérvári úti Stadion

5 December 2026 16	Újpest	v	Paks	Budapest
17:00 CET				Stadium: Szusza Ferenc Stadion

12 December 2026 17	Paks	v	Nyíregyháza	Paks
14:30 CET				Stadium: Fehérvári úti Stadion

19 December 2026 18	Debrecen	v	Paks	Debrecen
16:00 CET				Stadium: Nagyerdei Stadion

30 January 2027 19	Paks	v	Kisvárda	Paks
TBD				Stadium: Fehérvári úti Stadion

6 February 2026 20	MTK	v	Paks	Budapest
TBD				Stadium: Hidegkuti Nándor Stadion

13 February 2027 21	ETO Győr	v	Paks	Győr
TBD				Stadium: ETO Park

20 February 2027 22	Paks	v	Vasas	Paks
TBD				Stadium: Fehérvári úti Stadion

27 February 2027 23	Paks	v	Ferencváros	Paks
TBD				Stadium: Fehérvári úti Stadion

6 March 2027 24	Zalaegerszeg	v	Paks	Zalaegerszeg
TBD				Stadium: ZTE Arena

13 March 2027 25	Paks	v	Kispest-Honvéd	Paks
TBD				Stadium: Fehérvári úti Stadion

20 March 2027 26	Puskás Akadémia	v	Paks	Felcsút
TBD				Stadium: Pancho Aréna

3 April 2027 27	Paks	v	Újpest	Paks
TBD				Stadium: Fehérvári úti Stadion

10 April 2027 28	Nyíregyháza	v	Paks	Nyíregyháza
TBD				Stadium: Városi Stadion

17 April 2027 29	Paks	v	Debrecen	Paks
TBD				Stadium: Fehérvári úti Stadion

24 April 2027 30	Kisvárda	v	Paks	Kisvárda
TBD				Stadium: Várkerti Stadion

1 May 2027 31	Paks	v	MTK	Paks
TBD				Stadium: Fehérvári úti Stadion

15 May 2027 32	Paks	v	ETO Győr	Paks
TBD				Stadium: Fehérvári úti Stadion

22 May 2027 33	Vasas	v	Paks	Budapest
TBD				Stadium: Illovszky Rudolf Stadion

Source: MLSZ Adatbank

=== Magyar Kupa ===
==== Round of 64 ====
As a second-division team, Kazincbarcika is also entering this year's Hungarian Cup season now.

12 September 2026 R64	Kazincbarcika (NB II)	1–2	Paks	Kazincbarcika
15:00 CEST	Palincsár 1'; L. Rácz (yellow card) 85'	Report	Hahn 37'; Lenzsér (yellow card) 38'; Debreceni (yellow card) 46'; Silye 60'	Stadium: Kolorcity Aréna; Attendance: 762; Referee: Balázs Katona; Assistant referees: Norbert Bornemissza, Kristóf Bán
Note: • Paks: Gyetván — Silye, Debreceni, Belényesi, Lenzsér (Ke. Horváth (substituted on) 59') — Windecker — Simut, Vécsei, Balogh (Wiesner (substituted on) 86') — Hahn (Papp (substituted on) 73'), B. Tóth (J. Szalai (substituted on) 59') • Manager: György Bognár

==== Round of 32 ====
28 October 2026 R32	Cigánd (NB III)	1–2	Paks	Cigánd
12:30 CET	Biró (yellow card) 70'; Z. Horváth 74'	Report	Gyurkits 25'; Lapu (yellow card) 57'; J. Szalai 90+2'	Stadium: Városi stadion Attendance: 800; Referee: Ákos Takács; Assistant referees: Balázs Szert, Márton Gergely
Note: • Paks: Kovácsik — Lapu (J. Szalai (substituted on) 77'), Debreceni, Belényesi, Vas, Simut — Windecker, Ke. Horváth (Pető (substituted on) 46'), Gyurkits — Galambos (Wiesner (substituted on) 46'), B. Tóth • Manager: György Bognár

==== Round of 16 ====
10 February 2027 R16	Paks	v	Zalaegerszeg (NB I)	Paks
TBC				Stadium: Fehérvári úti Stadion

=== UEFA Conference League ===
==== Second qualifying round ====
The draw for the second qualifying round was held on 17 June 2026.

23 July 2026 1st leg	Paks (Hungarian Football Federation)	1–2	(Hellenic Football Federation) Panathinaikos	Paks, Hungary
20:00 CEST	Böde 71'	Report	Vas 41' (o.g.); Tsapras (yellow card) 53'; Gnezda Čerin (yellow card) 55'; Andino 56'; Pantelidis (yellow card) 90+1'	Stadium: Fehérvári úti Stadion; Attendance: 3,524; Referee: Luka Bilbija (Bosnia and Herzegovina); Assistant referees: Aleksandar Smiljanić, Marko Peric
Note: • Paks: Kovácsik — M. Szekszárdi (Győrfi (substituted on) 46'), Vas, J. Szabó (c) — Lenzsér (Kuzma (substituted on) 81'), Windecker, Balogh, Zeke — Hahn (Pető (substituted on) 62'), Papp (Ke. Horváth (substituted on) 62') — J. Szalai (Böde (substituted on) 62') • Manager: György Bognár • Player of the match: Santino Andino, Panathinaikos 7.8 • Best player of Paks: Milán Győrfi 7.4

30 July 2026 2nd leg	Panathinaikos (Hellenic Football Federation)	2–2 (4–3 agg.)	(Hungarian Football Federation) Paks	Athens, Greece (Hellenic Football Federation)
20:30 CEST (21:30 EEST (UTC+3))	Jagušić 44'; Rastoder 85'; Tsapras (yellow card) 89'	Report	Lapu (yellow card) 11'; Pető 35'; J. Szabó (yellow card) 45+2'; Győrfi 57'; Ke. Horváth (yellow card) 68'	Stadium: Olympic Stadium; Attendance: 22,414; Referee: Marc Nagtegaal (Netherlands); Assistant referees: Stefan De Groot, Johan Balder
Note: • Paks: Kovácsik — Vas, J. Szabó (c), Zeke — Győrfi (Balogh (substituted on) 85'), Windecker, Papp, Lapu (Lenzsér (substituted on) 46') — Ke. Horváth (Gyurkits (substituted on) 72'), J. Szalai (Böde (substituted on) 72'), Pető (B. Tóth (substituted on) 72') • Manager: György Bognár • Player of the match: Adriano Jagušić, Panathinaikos 8.7 • Best player of Paks: János Szabó 7.9

Panathinaikos won 4–3 on aggregate.

== Statistics ==
As of match played 22 November 2026

=== Goal scorers ===
Includes all competitions for senior teams. The list is sorted by squad number when season-total goals are equal. Players with no goals not included in the list.
We indicate in parentheses how many of the goals scored by the player from penalties.

Rank	No.	Pos.	Player	Nemzeti Bajnokság I (Domestic league)	Magyar Kupa (Domestic cup)	UEFA Conference League	Season total	Ref.
1	7	FW	(Hungary) József Szalai	7 (2)	1	0	8 (2)	
1	17	MF	(Hungary) Milán Pető	7	0	1	8	
3	10	FW	(Hungary) Zsolt Haraszti	2	0	0	2	
3	19	MF	(Hungary) Kevin Horváth	2	0	0	2	
3	22	MF	(Hungary) József Windecker	2	0	0	2	
6	2	DF	(Hungary) Ákos Kinyik	1	0	0	1	
6	4	MF	(Hungary) Andor Lapu	1	0	0	1	
6	5	MF	(Hungary) Bálint Vécsei	1	0	0	1	
6	6	DF	(Hungary) Milán Győrfi	0	0	1	1	
6	9	FW	(Hungary) János Hahn	0	1	0	1	
6	13	FW	(Hungary) Dániel Böde	0	0	1	1	
6	14	DF	(Hungary) Erik Silye	0	1	0	1	
6	18	MF	(Hungary) Gergő Gyurkits	0	1	0	1	
6	24	DF	(Hungary) Bence Lenzsér	1	0	0	1	
6	29	FW	(Hungary) Barna Tóth	1	0	0	1	
Own goals				0	0	0	0	
Total				25 (1)	4	3 (0)	32 (1)	

=== Penalties ===
Date	Penalty Taker	Scored	Opponent	Competition
3 August 2026	(Hungary) József Szalai	Yes	(Hungarian Football Federation) Zalaegerszeg (A)	Nemzeti Bajnokság I, Round 2
22 November 2026	(Hungary) József Szalai	Yes	(Hungarian Football Federation) Kispest-Honvéd (A)	Nemzeti Bajnokság I, Round 14

Note: (H) – Home; (A) – Away

== See also ==
- Paksi FC in European football
- List of Paksi FC seasons
- List of Paksi FC managers
