= Paksi FC in European football =

Paksi FC is a professional football club based in Paks, Hungary.

== Matches ==
Season	Competition	Round	Country	Club	Home	Away	Aggregate
2011–12	UEFA Europa League	1st Qualifying Round	(Andorra)	Santa Coloma	4–0	1–0	5–0
2011–12	UEFA Europa League	2nd Qualifying Round	(Norway)	Tromsø	1–1	3–0	4–1
2011–12	UEFA Europa League	3rd Qualifying Round	(Scotland)	Hearts	1–1	1–4	1–5
2024–25	UEFA Europa League	1st Qualifying Round	(Romania)	Corvinul Hunedoara	0–4	2–0	2–4
2024–25	UEFA Conference League	2nd Qualifying Round	(Cyprus)	AEK Larnaca	3–0	2–0	5–0
2024–25	UEFA Conference League	3rd Qualifying Round	(Montenegro)	FK Mornar Bar	3–0	2–2	5–2
2024–25	UEFA Conference League	Play-off	(Czech Republic)	Mladá Boleslav	0–3	2–2	2–5
2025–26	UEFA Europa League	1st Qualifying Round	(Romania)	CFR Cluj	0–0	0–3	0–3
2025–26	UEFA Conference League	2nd Qualifying Round	(Slovenia)	Maribor	1–0	1–1	2–1
2025–26	UEFA Conference League	3rd Qualifying Round	(Ukraine)	Polissya Zhytomyr	2–1	0–3	2–4
2026–27	UEFA Conference League	2nd Qualifying Round	(Greece)	Panathinaikos	1–2	2–2	3–4

== Record by country of opposition ==
- Correct as of 30 July 2026

Country	Pld	W	D	L	GF	GA	GD	Win%
Andorra	2	2	0	0	5	0	+5	100.00
Cyprus	2	2	0	0	5	0	+5	100.00
(Andorra) Czechia	2	0	1	1	2	5	−3	0.00
(Greece) Greek	2	0	1	1	3	4	−1	0.00
Montenegro	2	1	1	0	5	2	+3	50.00
Norway	2	1	1	0	4	1	+3	50.00
Romania	4	1	1	2	2	7	−5	25.00
Scotland	2	0	1	1	1	5	−4	0.00
Slovenia	2	1	1	0	2	1	+1	50.00
Ukraine	2	1	0	1	2	4	−2	50.00
Totals	22	9	7	6	31	29	+2	40.91

P – Played; W – Won; D – Drawn; L – Lost; GF – Goals for; GA – Goals against; GD – Goal difference;

== Records ==
As of 14 August 2025

- Biggest win: 7 July 2011, Paks 4–0 Santa Coloma, Székesfehérvár
- Biggest defeat: 11 July 2024, Paks 0–4 Corvinul Hunedoara, Paks
