= 2011–12 Paksi FC season =

Paks
2011–12 season
- Chairman: János Süli
- Manager: Károly Kis
- Nemzeti Bajnokság I: 6th
- Hungarian Cup: Round of 32
- Hungarian League Cup: Quarter-finals
- UEFA Europa League: Third qualifying round
- Top goalscorer: League: Dániel Böde (10); All: Dániel Böde (15)
- Highest home attendance: 4,100 v Ferencváros (26 May 2012)
- Lowest home attendance: 100 v Debrecen (28 February 2012)
Home colours	Away colours

The 2011–12 season was Paksi Football Club's 6th competitive season, 6th consecutive season in the Nemzeti Bajnokság I and 59th year in existence as a football club. In addition to the domestic league, Paks participated in this season's editions of the Hungarian Cup and Hungarian League Cup, and UEFA Europa League.

== First team squad ==
Note: Flags indicate national team as defined under FIFA eligibility rules; some limited exceptions apply. Players may hold more than one non-FIFA nationality.

No.	Pos.	Nation	Player
5	DF	HUN	Zsolt Gévay
6	MF	HUN	Tamás Sifter
7	MF	HUN	Tamás Báló
9	DF	HUN	Tamás Csehi
10	MF	HUN	Tamás Kiss
11	MF	HUN	Gábor Vayer
13	MF	HUN	Dániel Böde
16	MF	HUN	Tibor Heffler
17	FW	HUN	József Magasföldi
18	DF	HUN	Attila Fiola
19	DF	HUN	István Mészáros

No.	Pos.	Nation	Player
20	FW	HUN	Ádám Hrepka (on loan from MTK)
22	MF	HUN	István Sipeki
24	GK	HUN	Norbert Csernyánszki
25	FW	HUN	Márton Eppel
28	GK	HUN	Péter Pokorni
30	DF	HUN	János Szabó
32	MF	HUN	Lóránd Szatmári (on loan from Reggina)
39	FW	HUN	László Bartha
53	FW	HUN	Tibor Montvai
63	DF	HUN	László Éger

== Transfers ==
=== Summer ===
In: Note: Flags indicate national team as defined under FIFA eligibility rules; some limited exceptions apply. Players may hold more than one non-FIFA nationality.

No.	Pos.	Nation	Player
20	FW	HUN	Ádám Hrepka (loan from (Hungary) MTK Budapest)
27	MF	HUN	Norbert Heffler (from (Hungary) Lombard-Pápa TFC)
32	MF	HUN	Lóránd Szatmári (loan from (Italy) Reggina Calcio)
37	MF	HUN	Balázs Tóth B. (loan return from BFC Siófok)

Out: Note: Flags indicate national team as defined under FIFA eligibility rules; some limited exceptions apply. Players may hold more than one non-FIFA nationality.

No.	Pos.	Nation	Player
30	DF	HUN	János Szabó (loan to BFC Siófok)
37	MF	HUN	Balázs Tóth B. (to Szolnoki MÁV FC)
63	FW	HUN	Norbert Palásthy (to Mezőkövesd-Zsóry SE)
91	FW	HUN	Zsolt Haraszti (loan to BFC Siófok)

=== Winter ===
In: Note: Flags indicate national team as defined under FIFA eligibility rules; some limited exceptions apply. Players may hold more than one non-FIFA nationality.

No.	Pos.	Nation	Player
30	DF	HUN	János Szabó (loan return from BFC Siófok)
87	MF	HUN	Márton Eppel (from (Netherlands) N.E.C. Nijmegen)
91	FW	HUN	Zsolt Haraszti (loan return from BFC Siófok)
—	MF	HUN	Gergő Lakatos (from Paksi SE II)

Out: Note: Flags indicate national team as defined under FIFA eligibility rules; some limited exceptions apply. Players may hold more than one non-FIFA nationality.

No.	Pos.	Nation	Player
2	DF	HUN	István Nagy (on loan to BFC Siófok)
27	MF	HUN	Norbert Heffler (on loan to BFC Siófok)
87	FW	HUN	Barnabás Vári (on loan to Szolnoki MÁV FC)
91	FW	HUN	Zsolt Haraszti (to Videoton FC)

- List of Hungarian football transfer summer 2011
- List of Hungarian football transfers winter 2011–12

== Statistics ==
=== Appearances and goals ===
Last updated on 27 May 2012.

No.	Pos	Nat	Player	Total		OTP Bank Liga		Europa League		Hungarian Cup		League Cup	
No.	Pos	Nat	Player	Apps	Goals	Apps	Goals	Apps	Goals	Apps	Goals	Apps	Goals
5	DF	(Hungary) HUN	Zsolt Gévay	19	6	11	1	0	0	0	0	8	5
6	MF	(Hungary) HUN	Tamás Sifter	37	3	25	2	6	0	1	0	5	1
7	MF	(Hungary) HUN	Tamás Báló	26	0	16	0	5	0	1	0	4	0
9	DF	(Hungary) HUN	Tamás Csehi	16	0	7	0	2	0	0	0	7	0
10	MF	(Hungary) HUN	Tamás Kiss	40	8	27	5	5	2	0	0	8	1
11	MF	(Hungary) HUN	Gábor Vayer	38	11	26	6	5	2	1	0	6	3
13	MF	(Hungary) HUN	Dániel Böde	38	15	26	10	6	3	1	1	5	1
16	MF	(Hungary) HUN	Tibor Heffler	44	0	30	0	6	0	1	0	7	0
17	FW	(Hungary) HUN	József Magasföldi	35	8	22	2	6	2	1	1	6	3
18	DF	(Hungary) HUN	Attila Fiola	33	0	25	0	6	0	1	0	1	0
19	MF	(Hungary) HUN	István Mészáros	8	0	5	0	0	0	0	0	3	0
20	FW	(Hungary) HUN	Ádám Hrepka	31	12	23	7	2	0	0	0	6	5
22	MF	(Hungary) HUN	István Sipeki	39	1	26	0	6	1	1	0	6	0
24	GK	(Hungary) HUN	Norbert Csernyánszki	36	-56	29	-47	6	-6	1	-3	0	0
25	FW	(Hungary) HUN	Márton Eppel	5	0	3	0	0	0	0	0	2	0
28	GK	(Hungary) HUN	Péter Pokorni	7	-13	1	-4	0	0	0	0	6	-9
30	DF	(Hungary) HUN	János Szabó	16	0	14	0	1	0	0	0	1	0
32	MF	(Hungary) HUN	Lóránd Szatmári	30	4	23	4	0	0	0	0	7	0
39	FW	(Hungary) HUN	László Bartha	40	6	28	5	6	0	1	0	5	1
53	FW	(Hungary) HUN	Tibor Montvai	19	5	9	2	2	0	1	0	7	3
63	DF	(Hungary) HUN	László Éger	40	3	29	3	5	0	1	0	5	0
Youth players
8	FW	(Hungary) HUN	Roland Bohner	2	0	0	0	0	0	0	0	2	0
12	DF	(Hungary) HUN	Attila Cziráki	1	0	0	0	0	0	0	0	1	0
23	GK	(Hungary) HUN	Máté Kiss	2	-4	0	0	0	0	0	0	2	-4
29	MF	(Hungary) HUN	Gábor Tamási	3	1	0	0	0	0	0	0	3	1
86	DF	(Hungary) HUN	Roland Racskó	2	0	0	0	0	0	0	0	2	0
89	FW	(Hungary) HUN	Roland Pap	1	0	0	0	0	0	0	0	1	0
Players currently out on loan
2	DF	(Hungary) HUN	István Nagy	6	0	1	0	1	0	0	0	4	0
27	MF	(Hungary) HUN	Norbert Heffler	12	1	5	0	1	1	1	0	5	0
Players no longer at the club
91	FW	(Hungary) HUN	Zsolt Haraszti	2	0	0	0	2	0	0	0	0	0

=== Top scorers ===
Includes all competitive matches. The list is sorted by shirt number when total goals are equal.

Last updated on 27 May 2012

Position	Nation	Number	Name	OTP Bank Liga	Europea League	Hungarian Cup	League Cup	Total
1	(Hungary)	13	Dániel Böde	10	3	1	1	15
2	(Hungary)	20	Ádám Hrepka	7	0	0	5	12
3	(Hungary)	11	Gábor Vayer	6	2	0	3	11
4	(Hungary)	10	Tamás Kiss	5	2	0	1	8
5	(Hungary)	17	József Magasföldi	2	2	1	3	8
6	(Hungary)	39	László Bartha	5	0	0	1	6
7	(Hungary)	5	Zsolt Gévay	1	0	0	5	6
8	(Hungary)	53	Tibor Montvai	2	0	0	3	5
9	(Hungary)	32	Lóránd Szatmári	4	0	0	0	4
10	(Hungary)	63	László Éger	3	0	0	0	3
11	(Hungary)	6	Tamás Sifter	2	0	0	1	3
12	(Hungary)	27	Norbert Heffler	0	1	0	0	1
13	(Hungary)	22	István Sipeki	0	1	0	0	1
14	(Hungary)	29	Gábor Tamási	0	0	0	1	1
/	/	/	Own Goals	0	0	0	1	1
			TOTALS	47	11	2	24	84

=== Disciplinary record ===
Includes all competitive matches. Players with 1 card or more included only.

Last updated on 27 May 2012

Position	Nation	Number	Name	OTP Bank Liga		Europea League		Hungarian Cup		League Cup		Total (Hu Total)	
Position	Nation	Number	Name	Yellow card	Red card	Yellow card	Red card	Yellow card	Red card	Yellow card	Red card	Yellow card	Red card
DF	(Hungary)	5	Zsolt Gévay	3	0	0	0	0	0	3	0	6 (3)	0 (0)
MF	(Hungary)	6	Tamás Sifter	11	1	0	0	0	0	2	0	13 (11)	1 (1)
MF	(Hungary)	7	Tamás Báló	1	0	0	0	0	0	0	0	1 (1)	0 (0)
MF	(Hungary)	10	Tamás Kiss	1	0	0	0	0	0	0	0	1 (1)	0 (0)
MF	(Hungary)	11	Gábor Vayer	2	1	2	0	0	0	2	0	6 (2)	1 (1)
MF	(Hungary)	13	Dániel Böde	2	0	1	0	0	0	0	1	3 (2)	1 (0)
MF	(Hungary)	16	Tibor Heffler	4	0	1	0	0	0	0	0	5 (4)	0 (0)
FW	(Hungary)	17	József Magasföldi	3	1	0	0	0	0	0	0	3 (3)	1 (1)
DF	(Hungary)	18	Attila Fiola	6	1	1	0	0	1	0	0	7 (6)	2 (2)
FW	(Hungary)	20	Ádám Hrepka	2	0	1	0	0	0	0	0	3 (2)	0 (0)
MF	(Hungary)	22	István Sipeki	3	0	0	0	0	0	1	0	4 (3)	0 (0)
FW	(Hungary)	25	Márton Eppel	0	0	0	0	0	0	1	0	1 (0)	0 (0)
DF	(Hungary)	30	János Szabó	1	0	0	0	0	0	0	0	1 (1)	0 (0)
FW	(Hungary)	39	László Bartha	4	1	2	0	0	0	1	0	7 (4)	1 (1)
FW	(Hungary)	53	Tibor Montvai	1	0	1	0	0	0	0	0	2 (1)	0 (0)
DF	(Hungary)	63	László Éger	4	0	3	0	1	0	1	0	9 (4)	0 (0)
DF	(Hungary)	86	Roland Racskó	0	0	0	0	0	0	1	0	1 (0)	0 (0)
			TOTALS	48	5	12	0	1	1	12	1	73 (48)	7 (5)

=== Overall ===
Games played	45 (30 OTP Bank Liga, 6 UEFA Europa League, 1 Magyar Kupa and 8 Hungarian League Cup)
Games won	18 (12 OTP Bank Liga, 3 UEFA Europa League, 0 Magyar Kupa and 3 Hungarian League Cup)
Games drawn	13 (9 OTP Bank Liga, 2 UEFA Europa League, 0 Magyar Kupa and 2 Hungarian League Cup)
Games lost	14 (9 OTP Bank Liga, 1 UEFA Europa League, 1 Magyar Kupa and 3 Hungarian League Cup)
Goals scored	84
Goals conceded	73
Goal difference	+11
Yellow cards	73
Red cards	7
Worst discipline	(Hungary) Tamás Sifter (13 (yellow card) , 1 (red card) )
Best result	10–1 (H) v Szolnoki MÁV FC – Ligakupa – 07-09-2011
Worst result	0–5 (A) v Szombathelyi Haladás – OTP Bank Liga – 05-05-2012
Most appearances	(Hungary) Tibor Heffler (44 appearances)
Top scorer	(Hungary) Dániel Böde (15 goals)
Points	67/135 (49.63%)

Last updated: 27 May 2012

== Nemzeti Bajnokság I ==
=== Matches ===
17 July 2011 1	Paksi SE	3–2	Kecskeméti TE	Paks, Tolna County
19:00 CET (UTC+01)	Hrepka 16'; Bartha 49'; Böde 74'	(Report)	Stokić 30'; Simon 90'	Stadium: Stadion PSE; Attendance: 1,500; Referee: (Hungary) Péter Solymosi

24 July 2011 2	Videoton FC	4–0	Paksi SE	Székesfehérvár, Fejér County
16:00 CET (UTC+01)	Vasiljević 4' 68'; Alves 38'; Nikolić 87'	(Report)		Stadium: Stadion Sóstói; Attendance: 3,000; Referee: (Hungary) József Berger

31 July 2011 3	Paksi SE	1–1	Lombard-Pápa TFC	Paks, Tolna County
19:00 CET (UTC+01)	Vayer 53'	(Report)	Marić 29'	Stadium: Stadion PSE; Attendance: 1,800; Referee: (Hungary) Balázs Böcskei

7 August 2011 4	Újpest FC	0–2	Paksi SE	Budapest, Pest County
18:00 CET (UTC+01)		(Report)	Éger 59' (pen.); Vayer 90' (pen.)	Stadium: Szusza Ferenc Stadium; Attendance: 3,508; Referee: (Hungary) Ádám Farkas

13 August 2011 5	Paksi SE	1–1	BFC Siófok	Paks, Tolna County
19:00 CET (UTC+01)	Bartha 19'	(Report)	Melczer 32'	Stadium: Stadion PSE; Attendance: 2,500; Referee: (Hungary) Zsolt Szabó

20 August 2011 6	Paksi SE	1–2	Győri ETO FC	Paks, Tolna County
18:00 CET (UTC+01)	Montvai 90'	(Report)	Völgyi 41'; Pilibaitis 83'	Stadium: Stadion PSE; Attendance: 2,200; Referee: (Chile) Alvaro Miquel Garcia

27 August 2011 7	Kaposvári Rákóczi FC	4–4	Paksi SE	Kaposvár, Somogy County
19:00 CET (UTC+01)	Perić 30' 32'; Balázs 71'; Šafarić 87' (pen.)	(Report)	Kiss 56'; Bartha 69'; Böde 89'; Gévay 90+1'	Stadium: Stadion Kaposvár Rákóczi; Attendance: 4,000; Referee: (Hungary) Balázs Berke

11 September 2011 8	Paksi SE	1–1	Diósgyőri VTK	Paks, Tolna County
16:00 CET (UTC+01)	Montvai 78' (pen.)	(Report)	Budovinszky 86'	Stadium: Stadion PSE; Attendance: 2,500; Referee: (Hungary) János Takács

18 September 2011 9	Debreceni VSC	4–2	Paksi SE	Debrecen, Hajdú-Bihar County
16:00 CET (UTC+01)	Csehi 9' (o.g.); Coulibaly 66' 90+1'; Varga 75'	(Report)	Vayer 64' 85'	Stadium: Stadion Oláh Gábor Út; Attendance: 5,500; Referee: (Hungary) Szabolcs Szilasi

24 September 2011 10	Paksi SE	4–4	Pécsi Mecsek FC	Paks, Tolna County
18:00 CET (UTC+01)	Sifter 22'; Böde 25' 54' 89'	(Report)	Bajzát 18'; Nagy 48' 65'; Petrók 79'	Stadium: Stadion PSE; Attendance: 2,200; Referee: (Hungary) Balázs Böcskei

1 October 2011 11	Budapest Honvéd FC	2–3	Paksi SE	Budapest, Pest County
15:00 CET (UTC+01)	Botis 62'; Torghelle 70'	(Report)	Böde 47'; Vayer 66' 76'	Stadium: Bozsik Stadion; Attendance: 2,500; Referee: (Hungary) Ádám Farkas

15 October 2011 12	Paksi SE	3–2	Szombathelyi Haladás	Paks, Tolna County
18:00 CET (UTC+01)	Hrepka 35'; Böde 53'; Sifter 55'	(Report)	Vujović 47'; Nagy 68'	Stadium: Stadion PSE; Attendance: 1,560; Referee: (Hungary) Ádám Radványi

22 October 2011 13	Vasas SC	1–0	Paksi SE	Budapest, Pest County
15:00 CET (UTC+01)	Šimić 86'	(Report)		Stadium: Stadion Rudolf Illovszky; Attendance: 2,100; Referee: (Hungary) János Takács

29 October 2011 14	Paksi SE	4–2	Zalaegerszegi TE	Paks, Tolna County
17:00 CET (UTC+01)	Bartha 33'; Szatmári 48'; Magasföldi 71'; Kiss 81'	(Report)	Máté 53' 56'	Stadium: Stadion PSE; Attendance: 1,620; Referee: (Hungary) Roland Veizer

6 November 2011 15	Ferencvárosi TC	0–0	Paksi SE	Budapest, Pest County
18:00 CET (UTC+01)		(Report)		Stadium: Stadion Albert Flórián; Attendance: 9,000; Referee: (Hungary) Sándor Andó-Szabó

19 November 2011 16	Kecskeméti TE	0–1	Paksi SE	Kecskemét, Bács-Kiskun County
16:00 CET (UTC+01)		(Report)	Éger 77' (pen.)	Stadium: Széktói Stadion; Attendance: 2,000; Referee: (Hungary) Ádám Farkas

27 November 2011 17	Paksi SE	1–2	Videoton FC	Paks, Tolna County
16:00 CET (UTC+01)	Szatmári 40'	(Report)	Vinícius 66'; Nikolić 83'	Stadium: Stadion PSE; Attendance: 1,500; Referee: (Chile) Alvaro Miquel Garcia

3 March 2012 18	Lombard-Pápa TFC	1–0	Paksi SE	Pápa, Veszprém County
17:00 CET (UTC+01)	Seye 36'	(Report)		Stadium: Stadion Várkerti; Referee: (Hungary) Dániel Becséri

10 March 2012 19	Paksi SE	2–0	Újpest FC	Paks, Tolna County
16:00 CET (UTC+01)	Hrepka 4' 26'	(Report)		Stadium: Stadion PSE; Attendance: 3,468; Referee: (Hungary) Ádám Radványi

17 March 2012 20	BFC Siófok	2–0	Paksi SE	Siófok, Somogy County
16:00 CET (UTC+01)	Haraszti 29'; Melczer 71'	(Report)		Stadium: Révész Street Stadium; Attendance: 1,000; Referee: (Hungary) Mihály Fábián

25 March 2012 21	Győri ETO FC	4–1	Paksi SE	Győr, Győr-Moson-Sopron County
18:00 CET (UTC+01)	Trajković 65'; Koltai 62' (pen.); Pátkai 67' 81'	(Report)	Magasföldi 73'	Stadium: ETO Park; Attendance: 2,200; Referee: (Hungary) József Berger

31 March 2012 22	Paksi SE	0–0	Kaposvári Rákóczi FC	Paks, Tolna County
17:00 CET (UTC+01)		(Report)		Stadium: Stadion PSE; Attendance: 1,000; Referee: (Hungary) Péter Solymosi

7 April 2012 23	Diósgyőri VTK	1–2	Paksi SE	Miskolc, Borsod-Abaúj-Zemplén County
18:00 CET (UTC+01)	Seydi 78'	(Report)	Éger 30'; Hrepka 48'	Stadium: DVTK Stadion; Attendance: 7,000; Referee: (Hungary) Viktor Kassai

14 April 2012 24	Paksi SE	0–0	Debreceni VSC	Paks, Tolna County
15:00 CET (UTC+01)		(Report)		Stadium: Stadion PSE; Attendance: 3,000; Referee: (Hungary) Sándor Andó-Szabó

21 April 2012 25	Pécsi Mecsek FC	1–2	Paksi SE	Pécs, Baranya County
18:00 CET (UTC+01)	Bajzát 68'	(Report)	Hrepka 52' 71'	Stadium: Stadion PMFC; Attendance: 4,000; Referee: (Hungary) Tamás Bognár

27 April 2012 26	Paksi SE	2–1	Budapest Honvéd FC	Paks, Tolna County
18:00 CET (UTC+01)	Böde 26'; Kiss 70'	(Report)	Horváth 48'	Stadium: Stadion PSE; Attendance: 1,790; Referee: (Hungary) Balázs Berke

5 May 2012 27	Szombathelyi Haladás	5–0	Paksi SE	Szombathely, Vas County
17:00 CET (UTC+01)	Radó 4'; Nagy 9'; Iszlai 27' (pen.); Ugrai 82'; Kulcsár 90'	(Report)		Stadium: Rohonci Street Stadium; Attendance: 4,000; Referee: (Hungary) Dániel Becséri

11 May 2012 28	Paksi SE	2–1	Vasas SC	Paks, Tolna County
18:00 CET (UTC+01)	Böde 29'; Bartha 31'	(Report)	Bárányos 26'	Stadium: Stadion PSE; Attendance: 1,381; Referee: (Hungary) Balázs Böcskei

20 May 2012 29	Zalaegerszegi TE	1–1	Paksi SE	Zalaegerszeg, Zala County
15:00 CET (UTC+01)	Kocsárdi 18'	(Report)	Szatmári 82'	Stadium: ZTE Arena; Attendance: 1,241; Referee: (Qatar) Banjari Mohammed Al-Dosari

26 May 2012 30	Paksi SE	4–2	Ferencvárosi TC	Paks, Tolna County
15:00 CET (UTC+01)	Böde 10'; Kiss 35' 37'; Szatmári 47'	(Report)	Klein 18'; Oláh 20'	Stadium: Stadion PSE; Attendance: 4,100; Referee: (Hungary) Péter Solymosi

=== Classification ===
Pos	Team	Pld	W	D	L	GF	GA	GD	Pts	Qualification or relegation
4	Honvéd	30	13	7	10	48	40	+8	46	Qualification for Europa League first qualifying round (Note: Győr have been suspended from participating in UEFA competitions for the first season they qualify between the 2011–12 and 2013–14 seasons in relation to club licensing violations. As a consequence, since they finish in any of the top three positions, the respective qualifying spots have been allocated to the team(s) immediately below.)
5	Kecskemét	30	13	6	11	48	38	+10	45	
6	Paks	30	12	9	9	47	51	−4	45	
7	Diósgyőr	30	13	4	13	42	43	−1	43	
8	Haladás	30	9	11	10	39	37	+2	38	

Source: MLSZ (in Hungarian)
Rules for classification: 1st points; 2nd overall wins; 3rd goal difference; 4th goals scored

=== Results summary ===
Overall								Home						Away					
Pld	W	D	L	GF	GA	GD	Pts	W	D	L	GF	GA	GD	W	D	L	GF	GA	GD
30	12	9	9	47	51	−4	45	7	6	2	29	21	+8	5	3	7	18	30	−12

Last updated: 27 May 2012.
Source: NB1

=== Results by round ===
Round	1	2	3	4	5	6	7	8	9	10	11	12	13	14	15	16	17	18	19	20	21	22	23	24	25	26	27	28	29	30
Ground	H	A	H	A	H	H	A	H	A	H	A	H	A	H	A	A	H	A	H	A	A	H	A	H	A	H	A	H	A	H
Result	W	L	D	W	D	L	D	D	L	D	W	W	L	W	D	W	L	L	W	L	L	D	W	D	W	W	L	W	D	W
Position	3	9	11	7	6	10	9	9	11	11	10	8	8	8	8	8	8	8	8	8	8	8	8	8	6	6	6	6	6	6

Updated to match(es) played on 27 May 2012. Source: Matches
A = Away; H = Home; W = Win; D = Draw; L = Loss

== Hungarian Cup ==
26 October 2011 4	Putnok VSE	3–2	Paksi SE	Putnok, Borsod-Abaúj-Zemplén County
14:00	Boczki 14'; Monyók 81' (pen.); Zsarnai 82'	(Report)	Böde 54'; Magasföldi 86'	Stadium: Városi Sporttelep; Attendance: 500; Referee: (Hungary) Ferenc Karakó

== League Cup ==
=== Group stage ===
31 August 2011 1	Újpest FC	3–3	Paksi SE	Budapest, Pest County
18:00	Balogh 9'; Barczi 22' 40'	(Report)	Gévay 8'; Hrepka 68'; Montvai 82'	Stadium: Szusza Ferenc Stadium; Attendance: 300; Referee: (Hungary) Béla Botló

7 September 2011 2	Paksi SE	10–1	Szolnoki MÁV FC	Paks, Tolna County
16:30	Kiss 19'; Vayer 25' 40'; Gévay 34' 51'; Hrepka 45'; Montvai 48' 49'; Böde 64'; Tamási 68'	(Report)	Kalmár 7'	Stadium: Stadion PSE; Attendance: 250; Referee: (Hungary) Gábor Barna

5 October 2011 3	Paksi SE	1–2	Kecskeméti TE	Paks, Tolna County
15:00	Bartha 49'	(Report)	Pekár 64'; Maynard 67'	Stadium: Stadion PSE; Attendance: 150; Referee: (Hungary) Tibor Gyarmati

12 October 2011 4	Kecskeméti TE	2–1	Paksi SE	Kecskemét, Bács-Kiskun County
17:00	Bertus 11'; Mohl 66'	(Report)	Magasföldi 16'	Stadium: Széktói Stadion; Attendance: 300; Referee: (Hungary) Gábor Kovács

9 November 2011 5	Szolnoki MÁV FC	0–4	Paksi SE	Szolnok, Jász-Nagykun-Szolnok County
13:30		(Report)	Gévay 5'; Hrepka 75' 77'; Sifter 83'	Stadium: Tiszaligeti Stadion; Attendance: 100; Referee: (Hungary) Eszter Urbán

16 November 2011 6	Paksi SE	5–3	Újpest FC	Paks, Tolna County
13:00	Gévay 18'; Hrepka 45'; Magasföldi 52' 75'; Vayer 77'	(Report)	Balogh 8'; Wilson 51'; Marković 66'	Stadium: Stadion PSE; Attendance: 150; Referee: (Hungary) Dániel Becséri

==== Classification ====
Pos	Team	Pld	W	D	L	GF	GA	GD	Pts	Qualification
1	Kecskemét	6	4	1	1	13	10	+3	13	Advance to knockout phase
2	Paks	6	3	1	2	24	11	+13	10	Advance to knockout phase
3	Újpest	6	3	1	2	17	15	+2	10	
4	Szolnok	6	0	1	5	3	18	−15	1	

Rules for classification: 1) points; 2) goal difference; 3) number of goals scored.

=== Quarter-final ===
28 February 2012 1st leg	Paksi SE	0–1	Debreceni VSC	Paks, Tolna County
16:30		(Report)	Spitzmüller 54'	Stadium: Stadion PSE; Attendance: 100; Referee: (Hungary) Ádám Farkas

6 March 2012 2nd leg	Debreceni VSC	1–1 (2–1 agg.)	Paksi SE	Debrecen, Hajdú-Bihar County
18:00	Méyé 12'	(Report)	Ludánszki 24' (o.g.)	Stadium: Stadion Oláh Gábor Út; Attendance: 1,200; Referee: (Hungary) János Takács

== Europa League ==
The First and Second Qualifying Round draws took place at UEFA headquarters in Nyon, Switzerland on 20 June 2011.

30 June 2011 Q1 Leg 1	UE Santa Coloma (Andorra)	0–1	(Hungary) Paks	Andorra la Vella
19:00 CEST		(Report)	Vayer 15'	Stadium: Estadi Comunal d'Andorra la Vella; Attendance: 650; Referee: (Armenia) Suren Baliyan

7 July 2011 Q1 Leg 2	Paks (Hungary)	4–0 (5–0 agg.)	(Andorra) UE Santa Coloma	Székesfehérvár
20:00 CEST	Magasföldi 11', 49'; Böde 77'; N. Heffler 81'	(Report)		Stadium: Stadion Sóstói; Attendance: 2,000; Referee: (Montenegro) Jovan Kaludjerović

14 July 2011 Q2 Leg 1	Paks (Hungary)	1–1	(Norway) Tromsø IL	Székesfehérvár
20:00 CEST	Vayer 57'	(Report)	Drage 26'	Stadium: Stadion Sóstói; Attendance: 1,500; Referee: (Portugal) João Capela

21 July 2011 Q2 Leg 2	Tromsø IL (Norway)	0–3 (1–4 agg.)	(Hungary) Paks	Tromsø
19:00 CEST		(Report)	T. Kiss 59', 77'; Böde 62'	Stadium: Alfheim Stadion; Attendance: 2,710; Referee: (Turkey) Yunus Yıldırım

28 July 2011 Q3 Leg 1	Paks (Hungary)	1–1	(Scotland) Heart of Midlothian	Székesfehérvár
20:00	Sipeki 32'	(Report)	Hamill 45' (pen.)	Stadium: Sóstói Stadion; Attendance: 3,500; Referee: (Finland) Mattias Gestranius

4 August 2011 Q3 Leg 2	Heart of Midlothian (Scotland)	4–1 (5–2 agg.)	(Hungary) Paks	Edinburgh
20:45	Stevenson 34', 45+1'; Driver 50'; Skácel 76'	(Report)	Böde 89'	Stadium: Tynecastle Stadium; Attendance: 12,811; Referee: (Poland) Robert Malek

== Pre Season (Winter) ==
21 January 2012	Paksi SE	8–0	Bonyhád VLC	Paks, Tolna County
	Montvai 18'; Vayer 31'; Haraszti 41'; Magasföldi 67' (pen.) 81'; Hrepka 79'; Böde 75' 88'	(Report)		Stadium: Stadion PSE

26 January 2012	Paksi SE	1–0	Szigetszentmiklósi TK	Paks, Tolna County
	Montvai 78'	(Report)		Stadium: Stadion PSE; Attendance: 100; Referee: (Hungary) Zoltán Rácz

1 February 2012	Paksi SE	12–0	Komlói Bányász	Paks, Tolna County
	Montvai; Hrepka; Kiss; Éger; Magasföldi; Cziráki	(Report)		Stadium: Stadion PSE; Attendance: 50; Referee: (Hungary) Lacza

11 February 2012	(Romania) FC Petrolul Ploiești	2–1	Paksi SE	Belek, Turkey
	Buhuși 13'; Negru 58'	(Report)	Vayer 89'

13 February 2012	(Romania) ACF Gloria 1922 Bistriţa	1–3	Paksi SE	Belek, Turkey
		(Report)	Szatmári 37'; Vayer; Sifter 66'

17 February 2012	(Moldova) FC Zimbru Chișinău	2–1	Paksi SE	Belek, Turkey
		(Report)	Böde

25 February 2012	Paksi SE	2–0	Csákvári TK	Paks, Tolna County
	Magasföldi 28'; Montvai 77'	(Report)		Stadium: Stadion PSE
