= Karcagi SE =

Hungarian football club

Karcag
- Full name: Karcagi Sportegyesület
- Founded: 1945; 81 years ago, as Karcagi MTE
- Ground: Lipcsey Elemér Sporttelep
- Manager: Attila Varga
- League: NB II
- 2025–26: NB II, 11th of 16
- Website: https://karcagsport.hu/
Home colours	Away colours

Karcagi Sportegyesület is a professional football club based in Karcag, Jász-Nagykun-Szolnok, Hungary, that competes in the Nemzeti Bajnokság III – Northeast, the third tier of Hungarian football.

== Stadium ==
The club's home stadium is Ligeti úti Sporttelep, which is under reconstruction as of 28 March 2022. In the 2022-23 season, they played their home games at Városi Sportpálya in Balmazújváros.

Next season, Karcag will play at the home of Tiszafüred, at the Lipcsey Elemér Sporttelep, until their ground expected to be ready in spring 2024.

== Players ==
=== Current squad ===
As of 2 February, 2026

Note: Flags indicate national team as defined under FIFA eligibility rules; some limited exceptions apply. Players may hold more than one non-FIFA nationality.

No.	Pos.	Nation	Player
1	GK	HUN	Roland Gergely
4	DF	HUN	Máté Kovalovszki
5	DF	HUN	Ábel Győri
6	MF	HUN	Maxim Osztrovka (on loan from Kisvárda)
7	FW	HUN	Dávid Székely
8	MF	HUN	Máté Vida
11	FW	HUN	Gergő Regenyei
14	DF	HUN	Félix Sághy
15	DF	HUN	Árpád Mona
17	MF	HUN	Zoltán Bodor
18	FW	NGR	Shedrach Kaye (on loan from Debrecen)
19	FW	ROU	Áron Girsik
20	FW	HUN	Gergő Görög

No.	Pos.	Nation	Player
21	DF	HUN	Bence Fábián (on loan from Debrecen)
22	MF	HUN	Márk Györgye
23	DF	HUN	Lóránt Fazekas
24	DF	HUN	Tamás Szekszárdi
26	MF	HUN	Patrik Hidi
33	FW	HUN	Olivér Fekete
71	GK	HUN	Eduard Fedinisinec
77	FW	HUN	Dávid László
87	GK	HUN	Márk Engedi
92	DF	HUN	Kristóf Szűcs
96	MF	HUN	Balázs Sain
97	FW	HUN	Máté Kohut
99	MF	HUN	Zsolt Pap

== Honours and achievements ==
=== League ===
- Megyei Bajnokság I (Szolnok county) / Nemzeti Bajnokság III (level 3)
  - Winners (1): 1979–80
- Megyei Bajnokság I (Szolnok / Jász-Nagykun-Szolnok county) (level 4)
  - Winners (4): 1983–84, 1990–91, 1999–2000, 2021–22
  - Runners-up (7): 1982–83, 1988–89, 2000–01, 2002–03, 2009–10, 2013–14, 2014–15

== Seasons ==
=== League positions ===
As of 26 July 2025

- Between 1997–98 and 2000–2001, and in 2002–03 and the fourth tier league called NB III.
- In 2001–02, and between 2003–04 and 2004–05 the third tier league called NB II.

=== Table ===
The table below shows the seasons of Karcagi SE.

Season	Tier	Club's name	Position	Pts	Manager
1945	2	Karcagi MTE	0 / 4		
1945–46	2	Karcagi MTE	10 / 12	13	
1946–47	3	Karcagi MTE	5 / 11	23	
1947–48	3	Karcagi MÁV MTE	13 / 13	9	
1948–49	3	Karcagi SzTE	4 / 16	31	
1949–50	3	Karcagi SzTE	7 / 16	31	
1950	3	Karcagi SzTE	17 / 17	6	
1951	3	Karcagi Petőfi	11 / 14	23	
1952	3	Karcagi Vörös Meteor	9 / 14	22	
1953	3	Karcagi Spartacus	12 / 16	22	
1954	3	Karcagi Spartacus	4 / 16	38	
1955	3	Karcagi Spartacus	11 / 17	31	
1956	3	Karcagi Spartacus	16 / 16	13	
1957	3	Karcagi Hunyadi	5 / 7	11	
1957–58	4	Karcagi Medosz	3 / 18	42	
1958–59	4	Karcag	8 / 16	31	
1959–60	4	Karcag	10 / 16	27	
1960–61	4	Karcag	6 / 16	27	
1961–62	4	Karcagi MEDOSZ	4 / 16	34	
1962–63	4	Karcagi MEDOSZ	8 / 16	27	
1963 ősz	5	Karcagi MEDOSZ	4 / 9	17	
1964	5	Karcag	9 / 18	28	
1965	5	Karcagi MEDOSZ SK	13 / 16	23	
1966	5	Karcag	13 / 16	23	
1967	5	Karcag	8 / 16	29	
1968	5	Karcag	3 / 16	41	
1969	5	Karcag	4 / 16	39	
1970	5	Karcagi SZSE	10 / 10	13	
1970–71	5	Karcagi SZSE	8 / 18	35	
1971–72	5	Karcag	6 / 16	32	
1972–73	5	Karcag	11 / 16	26	
1973–74	5	Karcag	15 / 16	17	
1974–75	5	Karcag	3 / 16	38	
1975–76	4	Karcag	8 / 16	29	
1976–77	4	Karcag	13 / 18	29	
1977–78	4	Karcag	12 / 18	31	
1978–79	3	Karcag	7 / 18	37	
1979–80	3	Karcagi Szövetkezeti SE	1 / 18	59	
1980–81	2	Karcagi SE	19 / 20	23	
1981–82	3	Karcagi SE	14 / 16	20	
1982–83	4	Karcag	2 / 18	45	
1983–84	4	Karcagi SE	1 / 18	55	
1984–85	3	Karcagi SE	10 / 16	28	
1985–86	3	Karcagi SE	10 / 16	28	
1986–87	3	Karcagi SE	12 / 16	25	
1987–88	3	Karcagi SE	16 / 16	12	
1988–89	4	Karcag	2 / 16	39	
1989–90	4	Karcag	10 / 16	37	
1990–91	4	Karcagi SE	1 / 16	43	
1991–92	3	Karcagi SE	8 / 16	32	
1992–93	3	Karcag Épkar VSE	4 / 16	39	
1993–94	3	Karcag Épkar VSE	6 / 16	31	
1994–95	3	Karcag Épkar SE	5 / 16	45	
1995–96	3	Karcag-Joma SE	5 / 16	48	
1996–97	3	Karcag-Joma SE	12 / 16	34	
1997–98	4	Karcag	12 / 16	36	
1998–99	4	Karcagi SE	5 / 16	53	
1999–00	4	Karcag	1 / 16	72	
2000	3	Karcagi SE	5 / 8	18	
2000–01	4	Karcagi SE	2 / 11	42	
2001–02	3	Karcagi SE	12 / 13	20	
2002–03	4	Karcag	2 / 16	66	
2003–04	3	Karcag	9 / 16	41	
2004–05	3	Karcag	7 / 16	44	
2005–06	2	Karcag	13 / 16	28	
2006–07	2	Karcagi SE	9 / 16	37	
2007–08	4	Karcagi SE	3 / 18	68	
2008–09	4	Karcagi SE	5 / 18	63	
2009–10	4	Karcagi SE	2 / 18	67	
2010–11	4	Karcagi SE	5 / 16	53	
2011–12	4	Karcagi SE	7 / 16	43	
2012–13	4	Karcagi SE	3 / 16	53	
2013–14	4	Karcagi SE	2 / 16	68	
2014–15	4	Karcagi SE	2 / 16	69	
2015–16	4	Karcagi SE	5 / 16	52	
2016–17	4	Karcagi SE	5 / 16	58	
2017–18	4	Karcagi SE	4 / 16	54	
2018–19	4	Karcagi SE	4 / 16	55	
2019–20	4	Karcagi SE	6 / 15	31	
2020–21	4	Karcagi SE	4 / 15	51	
2021–22	4	Karcagi SE	1 / 15	72	
2022–23	3	Karcagi SE	7 / 20	58	(Serbia) Bogdanović, (Hungary) Orosz, (Hungary) Csillag
2023–24	3	Karcagi SE	8 / 16	44	(Hungary) Csillag, (Hungary) Varga
2024–25	3	Karcagi SE	1 / 16	70	(Hungary) Varga
2025–26	2	Karcagi SE	11 / 16	35	(Hungary) Varga

== Managers ==
- (Hungary) Attila Varga (12 September 2023-present)
