= 2025–26 Nemzeti Bajnokság II =

Nemzeti Bajnokság II
- Season: 2025–26
- Dates: 27 July 2025 – 17 May 2026
- Matches: 16
- Goals: 37 (2.31 per match)
- Top goalscorer: Zsolt Magyar (3 goals)
- All statistics correct as of 5 August 2025.

The 2025–26 Nemzeti Bajnokság II (also known as 2025–26 Merkantil Bank Liga for sponsorship reasons) is Hungary's 75th season of the Nemzeti Bajnokság II, the second tier of the Hungarian football league system.

== Overview ==
The fixtures were announced on 1 July 2025.

== Teams ==
The following teams have changed division since the 2024–25 season.

=== Changes ===
==== To NB II ====
| Relegated from 2024–25 Nemzeti Bajnokság I | Promoted from 2024–25 Nemzeti Bajnokság III |
|---|---|
| ▼ Videoton (Fehérvár) ▼ Kecskemét | ▲ Tiszakécske (Southeast) ▲ Karcag (Northeast) |

==== From NB II ====
| Promoted to 2025–26 Nemzeti Bajnokság I | Relegated to 2025–26 Nemzeti Bajnokság III |
|---|---|
| ▲ Kisvárda ▲ Kazincbarcika | ▼ Gyirmót (Northwest) ▼ Tatabánya (Northwest) |

=== Stadium and locations ===
Note: Table lists in alphabetical order.

Location of teams in 2024–25 Nemzeti Bajnokság II
Location of the teams in Budapest.

| Team | Location | Stadium | Cap. | 2024–25 |
|---|---|---|---|---|
| Ajka | Ajka | Városi Stadion | 5,000 | 12th |
| Békéscsaba | Békéscsaba | Kórház utcai Stadion | 2,479 | 14th |
| Budafok | Budapest (Budafok) | Promontor utcai Stadion | 4,000 | 13th |
| BVSC | Budapest (Zugló) | Szőnyi úti Stadion | 12,000 | 9th |
| Csákvár | Csákvár | Tersztyánszky Ödön Sportközpont | 2,020 | 10th |
| Honvéd | Budapest (Kispest) | Bozsik Aréna | 8,000 | 8th |
| Karcag | Karcag | Ligeti úti Sporttelep | 2,500 | (NB III, Play-off) |
| Kecskemét | Kecskemét | Széktói Stadion | 6,320 | 12th (NB I) |
| Kozármisleny | Kozármisleny | Kozármislenyi Stadion | 2,000 | 4th |
| Mezőkövesd | Mezőkövesd | Városi Stadion | 4,183 | 6th |
| Soroksár | Budapest (Soroksár) | Szamosi Mihály Sportelep | 5,000 | 11th |
| Szeged | Szeged | Szent Gellért Fórum | 8,136 | 7th |
| Szentlőrinc | Szentlőrinc | Szentlőrinci Sportpálya | 1,020 | 5th |
| Tiszakécske | Tiszakécske | Városi Stadion | 4,500 | (NB III, Play-off) |
| Vasas | Budapest (Angyalföld) | Illovszky Rudolf Stadion | 5,154 | 3rd |
| Videoton | Székesfehérvár | Sóstói Stadion | 14,201 | 11th (NB I) |

| FC Ajka | Békéscsaba | Budafok | BVSC |
|---|---|---|---|
| Városi Stadion | Kórház utcai Stadion | Promontor utcai Stadion | Szőnyi úti Stadion |
| Capacity: 5,000 | Capacity: 4,963 | Capacity: 1,200 | Capacity: 12,000 |
| Csákvár | Honvéd | Karcag | Kecskemét |
| Tersztyánszky Ödön Sportközpont | Bozsik Aréna | Ligeti úti Sporttelep | Széktói Stadion |
| Capacity: 2,500 | Capacity: 8,200 | Capacity: 2,500 | Capacity: 6,320 |
| Kozármisleny | Mezőkövesd | Soroksár | Szeged |
| Alkotmány téri Stadion | Városi Stadion | Szamosi Mihály Sportelep | Szent Gellért Fórum |
| Capacity: 2,000 | Capacity: 4,183 | Capacity: 5,000 | Capacity: 8,256 |
| Szentlőrinc | Tiszakécske | Vasas | Videoton (Fehérvár) |
| Sportpálya | Városi Stadion | Illovszky Rudolf Stadion | Sóstói Stadion |
| Capacity: 1,020 | Capacity: 4,500 | Capacity: 5,054 | Capacity: 14,201 |

==== Number of teams by counties and regions ====
Number of teams by counties
| Pos. | County | No. of teams | Teams |
|---|---|---|---|
| 1 | Budapest | 5 | Budafok, BVSC-Zugló, Honvéd, Soroksár and Vasas |
| 2 | Bács-Kiskun | 2 | Kecskemét and Tiszakécske |
| 2 | Baranya | 2 | Kozármisleny and Szentlőric |
| 2 | Fejér | 2 | Csákvár and Videoton |
| 5 | Békés | 1 | Békéscsaba |
| 5 | Borsod-Abaúj-Zemplén | 1 | Mezőkövesd |
| 5 | Csongrád-Csanád | 1 | Szeged |
| 5 | Jász–Nagykun–Szolnok | 1 | Karcag |
| 5 | Veszprém | 1 | Ajka |

Number of teams by regions
| Transdanubia | Central Hungary | Great Plain and North |
|---|---|---|
| Ajka; Csákvár; Kozármisleny; Szentlőrinc; Videoton | Budafok; BVSC-Zugló; Honvéd; Soroksár; Vasas | Békéscsaba; Karcag; Kecskemét; Mezőkövesd; Szeged; Tiszakécske |
| 5 Teams | 5 Teams | 6 Teams |

=== Personnel and kits ===
Hungarian national sports betting brand Tippmix sponsored all 16 teams of the second league since February 2019, their logo were present on all team kits.

Note: Flags indicate national team as has been defined under FIFA eligibility rules. Players and Managers may hold more than one non-FIFA nationality.

| Team | Head coach | Captain | Kit maker | Kit sponsor(s) | |
| Team | Head coach | Captain | Kit maker | Main | Other(s) |
|---|---|---|---|---|---|
| Ajka | (Hungary) Bálint Gaál (caretaker) | (Hungary) Zoltán Kenderes | Puma | Bakony Erőmű | None |
| Békéscsaba | (Hungary) Sándor Csató | (Hungary) Dániel Póser | Saller | Békés Drén | None |
| Budafok | (Hungary) Géza Mészöly | (Hungary) Dávid Kovács | 2Rule | Zakariás Alapítvány | None |
| BVSC-Zugló | (Serbia) Dragan Vukmir | (Hungary) Paulo Vinícius | Adidas | None | None |
| Csákvár | (Hungary) Balázs Tóth | (Hungary) Roland Baracskai | 2Rule | ZÁÉV | List: Back: Aqvital |
| Honvéd | (Hungary) Tamás Feczkó | (Hungary) Szilveszter Hangya | Macron | None | None |
| Karcag | (Hungary) Attila Varga | (Hungary) Dávid Székely | Joma | Agrosprint | None |
| Kecskemét | (Hungary) Zoltán Gera | (Hungary) Csaba Belényesi | Kappa | HÉP | List: Sleeves: Hovány; Shorts: Piroska Szörp and Kecskeméti Fürdő |
| Kozármisleny | (Hungary) Csaba Csizmadia | (Hungary) Gergő Gajág | Macron | HR-Rent | None |
| Mezőkövesd | (Hungary) Aurél Csertői | (Hungary) Tamás Cseri | Adidas | Zsóry Gyógy- és Strandfürdő | None |
| Soroksár | (Hungary) Péter Lipcsei | (Hungary) Balázs Lovrencsics | Nike | Provident | List: Front: VízBolt and District of Soroksár; Back: 11teamsports |
| Szeged | (Hungary) Zoltán Aczél | (Hungary) Tamás Molnár-Farkas | Foreleven11 | None | List: Sleeves: caritas Hungarica |
| Szentlőrinc | (Hungary) Róbert Waltner | (Hungary) Richárd Nagy | Macron | AbsoluteTeamsport | None |
| Tiszakécske | (Hungary) Csaba Pintér | (Hungary) Róbert Csáki | Nike | Duna Group | None |
| Vasas | (Hungary) Gábor Erős | (Hungary) Botond Baráth | Adidas | OTP Bank | List: Sleeves: SMP Solution and PrímaEnergia |
| Videoton | (Hungary) Gábor Boér | (Hungary) Csaba Spandler | Adidas | None | None |

==== Managerial changes ====
| Team | Outgoing manager | Manner of departure | Date of vacancy | Position in table | Incoming manager | Date of appointment | Ref. |
|---|---|---|---|---|---|---|---|
| BVSC | (Hungary) József Csábi | End of contract | 26 May 2025 | Pre-season | (Serbia) Dragan Vukmir | 16 June 2025 | |
| Szeged | (Serbia) Aleksandar Jović | Mutual consent | 27 May 2025 | Pre-season | (Hungary) Zoltán Aczél | 30 May 2025 | |
| Vasas | (Hungary) Attila Pintér | End of contract | 31 May 2025 | Pre-season | (Hungary) Gábor Erős | 5 June 2025 | |
| Tiszakécske | (Hungary) Pál Balogh | Mutual consent | 23 June 2025 | Pre-season | (Hungary) Csaba Pintér | 23 June 2025 | |
| Videoton | (Hungary) Krisztián Timár | End of contract | 23 June 2025 | Pre-season | (Hungary) Gábor Boér | 23 June 2025 | |

== League table ==
| Pos | Team | Pld | W | D | L | GF | GA | GD | Pts | Promotion or relegation |
|---|---|---|---|---|---|---|---|---|---|---|
| 1 | Vasas (C, P) | 30 | 20 | 4 | 6 | 59 | 26 | +33 | 64 | Promotion to Nemzeti Bajnokság I |
| 2 | Honvéd (P) | 30 | 18 | 5 | 7 | 49 | 25 | +24 | 59 | Promotion to Nemzeti Bajnokság I |
| 3 | Kecskemét | 30 | 16 | 3 | 11 | 49 | 39 | +10 | 51 | |
| 4 | Kozármisleny | 30 | 13 | 9 | 8 | 38 | 40 | −2 | 48 | |
| 5 | Mezőkövesd | 30 | 13 | 7 | 10 | 37 | 34 | +3 | 46 | |
| 6 | Csákvár | 30 | 12 | 10 | 8 | 43 | 37 | +6 | 46 | |
| 7 | BVSC | 30 | 12 | 5 | 13 | 36 | 30 | +6 | 41 | |
| 8 | Videoton | 30 | 10 | 9 | 11 | 37 | 33 | +4 | 39 | |
| 9 | Szeged | 30 | 9 | 9 | 12 | 29 | 34 | −5 | 36 | |
| 10 | Tiszakécske | 30 | 10 | 9 | 11 | 37 | 44 | −7 | 35 (Note: Tiszakécske were deducted four points due to fielding an illegal player during their match on 2 February 2026 versus Soroksár.) | |
| 11 | Karcag | 30 | 9 | 8 | 13 | 29 | 41 | −12 | 35 | |
| 12 | Ajka | 30 | 10 | 3 | 17 | 23 | 40 | −17 | 33 | |
| 13 | Soroksár | 30 | 8 | 9 | 13 | 41 | 45 | −4 | 33 | |
| 14 | Szentlőrinc | 30 | 7 | 12 | 11 | 35 | 42 | −7 | 33 | |
| 15 | Budafok (R) | 30 | 7 | 8 | 15 | 33 | 49 | −16 | 29 | Relegation to Nemzeti Bajnokság III |
| 16 | Békéscsaba (R) | 30 | 6 | 10 | 14 | 27 | 42 | −15 | 28 | Relegation to Nemzeti Bajnokság III |

Source: Hungarian Football Federation (in Hungarian), Soccerway
Rules for classification: 1) Points; 2) Matches won; 3) Goal difference; 4) Goals scored; 5) Head-to-head points; 6) Head-to-head goal difference; 7) Fair play ranking; 8) Drawing of lots.
(C) Champions; (P) Promoted; (R) Relegated

== Results ==
| Home \ Away | AJK | BEK | BUD | BVS | CSA | HON | KAR | KEC | KOZ | MEZ | SOR | SZG | SZL | TIS | VAS | VID |
|---|---|---|---|---|---|---|---|---|---|---|---|---|---|---|---|---|
| Ajka | — | 1–0 | 0–1 | 0–2 | 1–2 | 1–0 | 0–1 | 1–3 | 0–2 | 1–2 | 2–1 | 0–3 | 2–1 | 1–4 | 1–0 | 1–1 |
| Békéscsaba | 0–2 | — | 2–0 | 2–1 | 2–2 | 0–2 | 0–0 | 1–1 | 1–2 | 0–0 | 2–1 | 1–1 | 0–0 | 0–3 | 0–1 | 0–1 |
| Budafok | 0–1 | 0–3 | — | 1–1 | 2–0 | 1–1 | 0–0 | 2–0 | 2–2 | 0–2 | 2–2 | 2–0 | 1–1 | 1–1 | 0–3 | 2–2 |
| BVSC | 4–0 | 0–1 | 0–2 | — | 1–1 | 4–1 | 1–1 | 0–1 | 0–1 | 0–1 | 2–1 | 1–1 | 2–1 | 3–1 | 0–0 | 1–0 |
| Csákvár | 1–0 | 1–1 | 2–0 | 2–0 | — | 0–2 | 1–2 | 6–1 | 0–2 | 2–1 | 1–0 | 1–1 | 2–2 | 3–1 | 2–2 | 1–5 |
| Honvéd | 1–0 | 2–1 | 3–0 | 3–0 | 3–1 | — | 5–2 | 0–1 | 1–2 | 5–2 | 0–0 | 0–0 | 2–1 | 1–1 | 3–1 | 2–1 |
| Karcag | 0–1 | 4–2 | 3–2 | 1–3 | 1–0 | 0–1 | — | 1–2 | 1–1 | 0–3 | 3–2 | 1–0 | 0–1 | 0–1 | 1–0 | 1–0 |
| Kecskemét | 0–1 | 2–0 | 2–1 | 0–2 | 2–2 | 1–0 | 2–0 | — | 3–0 | 2–1 | 2–1 | 4–0 | 3–0 | 5–1 | 1–2 | 3–1 |
| Kozármisleny | 1–1 | 3–0 | 1–0 | 0–3 | 2–2 | 2–1 | 2–1 | 2–1 | — | 3–0 | 1–1 | 2–1 | 0–0 | 0–2 | 0–4 | 1–1 |
| Mezőkövesd | 1–1 | 0–1 | 1–0 | 1–0 | 1–0 | 1–2 | 2–0 | 1–1 | 2–0 | — | 0–0 | 1–0 | 0–3 | 1–0 | 0–2 | 0–2 |
| Soroksár | 3–1 | 1–1 | 2–1 | 2–1 | 0–1 | 0–1 | 1–1 | 3–0 | 3–2 | 1–5 | — | 0–1 | 2–1 | 2–2 | 0–2 | 3–1 |
| Szeged | 0–1 | 1–1 | 4–0 | 2–1 | 0–1 | 0–0 | 2–2 | 1–0 | 1–0 | 1–2 | 0–3 | — | 2–0 | 1–1 | 0–4 | 0–3 |
| Szentlőrinc | 1–0 | 2–2 | 5–3 | 2–0 | 0–0 | 1–2 | 1–1 | 3–4 | 1–1 | 1–1 | 2–2 | 0–2 | — | 1–1 | 0–4 | 2–1 |
| Tiszakécske | 2–1 | 2–0 | 1–2 | 1–0 | 1–2 | 1–0 | 1–1 | 2–1 | 0–2 | 1–1 | 3–2 | 1–4 | 1–2 | — | 0–0 | 1–1 |
| Vasas | 2–1 | 4–3 | 3–2 | 0–2 | 1–4 | 1–2 | 2–0 | 2–0 | 6–0 | 4–3 | 3–1 | 0–0 | 1–0 | 1–0 | — | 2–0 |
| Videoton | 1–0 | 2–0 | 1–3 | 0–1 | 0–0 | 0–3 | 2–0 | 2–1 | 1–1 | 1–1 | 1–1 | 1–0 | 0–0 | 5–0 | 0–2 | — |

Source: Hungarian Football Federation (in Hungarian), Soccerway
Legend: Blue = home team win; Yellow = draw; Red = away team win.
For upcoming matches, an "a" indicates there is an article about the rivalry between the two participants.

== Positions by round ==
The table lists the positions of teams after each week of matches. To preserve chronological evolvements, any postponed matches are not included in the round at which they were originally scheduled, but added to the full round they were played immediately afterwards.

| Team ╲ Round | 1 | 2 | 3 | 4 | 5 | 6 | 7 | 8 | 9 | 10 | 11 | 12 | 13 | 14 | 15 | 16 | 17 | 18 | 19 | 20 | 21 | 22 | 23 | 24 | 25 | 26 | 27 | 28 | 29 | 30 |
|---|---|---|---|---|---|---|---|---|---|---|---|---|---|---|---|---|---|---|---|---|---|---|---|---|---|---|---|---|---|---|
| Vasas | 14 | 8 | 4 | 8 | 5 | 4 | 2 | 2 | 2 | 1 | 1 | 1 | 1 | 2 | 2 | 3 | 2 | 2 | 2 | 2 | 2 | 2 | 2 | 2 | 1 | 1 | 1 | 1 | 1 | 1 |
| Honvéd | 3 | 1 | 1 | 2 | 1 | 3 | 1 | 1 | 1 | 3 | 2 | 2 | 2 | 1 | 1 | 1 | 1 | 1 | 1 | 1 | 1 | 1 | 1 | 1 | 2 | 2 | 2 | 2 | 2 | 2 |
| Kecskemét | 11 | 16 | 10 | 7 | 9 | 7 | 5 | 6 | 4 | 6 | 3 | 6 | 3 | 4 | 3 | 2 | 4 | 4 | 4 | 3 | 3 | 3 | 4 | 3 | 3 | 3 | 3 | 3 | 3 | 3 |
| Kozármisleny | 12 | 12 | 16 | 14 | 16 | 16 | 15 | 15 | 16 | 13 | 10 | 9 | 10 | 9 | 10 | 8 | 8 | 7 | 8 | 6 | 7 | 10 | 10 | 7 | 7 | 7 | 7 | 5 | 5 | 4 |
| Mezőkövesd | 4 | 3 | 3 | 4 | 3 | 1 | 4 | 3 | 3 | 2 | 4 | 3 | 4 | 5 | 5 | 4 | 3 | 3 | 3 | 4 | 4 | 4 | 3 | 4 | 4 | 4 | 4 | 4 | 4 | 5 |
| Csákvár | 2 | 2 | 2 | 1 | 4 | 2 | 3 | 4 | 5 | 7 | 5 | 7 | 5 | 3 | 4 | 5 | 5 | 5 | 5 | 5 | 5 | 5 | 5 | 5 | 5 | 5 | 5 | 6 | 6 | 6 |
| BVSC | 1 | 6 | 9 | 12 | 13 | 14 | 16 | 16 | 15 | 16 | 16 | 12 | 9 | 11 | 12 | 11 | 11 | 10 | 11 | 11 | 9 | 8 | 9 | 11 | 12 | 8 | 9 | 8 | 8 | 7 |
| Videoton | 15 | 14 | 14 | 15 | 12 | 13 | 10 | 9 | 9 | 11 | 8 | 10 | 12 | 12 | 11 | 13 | 12 | 11 | 9 | 8 | 6 | 6 | 6 | 6 | 6 | 6 | 6 | 7 | 7 | 8 |
| Szeged | 6 | 5 | 6 | 3 | 2 | 5 | 7 | 5 | 6 | 4 | 6 | 4 | 6 | 7 | 7 | 7 | 7 | 8 | 7 | 9 | 10 | 9 | 7 | 9 | 10 | 12 | 12 | 11 | 9 | 9 |
| Tiszakécske | 5 | 4 | 5 | 11 | 11 | 10 | 12 | 14 | 14 | 9 | 11 | 8 | 8 | 8 | 8 | 9 | 9 | 9 | 10 | 10 | 11 | 11 | 12 | 12 | 9 | 10 | 11 | 12 | 10 | 10 |
| Karcag | 13 | 7 | 7 | 5 | 7 | 6 | 6 | 7 | 7 | 5 | 7 | 5 | 7 | 6 | 6 | 6 | 6 | 6 | 6 | 7 | 8 | 7 | 8 | 10 | 8 | 9 | 8 | 9 | 11 | 11 |
| Ajka | 16 | 15 | 8 | 6 | 8 | 11 | 13 | 8 | 8 | 10 | 13 | 14 | 11 | 10 | 9 | 10 | 10 | 12 | 13 | 12 | 12 | 12 | 11 | 8 | 11 | 11 | 10 | 10 | 12 | 12 |
| Soroksár | 9 | 11 | 12 | 13 | 15 | 12 | 9 | 11 | 12 | 8 | 9 | 11 | 13 | 13 | 14 | 16 | 16 | 16 | 16 | 15 | 15 | 16 | 16 | 14 | 13 | 13 | 13 | 13 | 13 | 13 |
| Szentlőrinc | 10 | 10 | 13 | 9 | 6 | 8 | 8 | 10 | 10 | 14 | 14 | 15 | 14 | 15 | 15 | 12 | 13 | 14 | 15 | 16 | 16 | 15 | 15 | 16 | 16 | 16 | 16 | 14 | 14 | 14 |
| Budafok | 8 | 13 | 15 | 16 | 14 | 15 | 14 | 13 | 13 | 15 | 15 | 16 | 16 | 14 | 13 | 15 | 15 | 13 | 12 | 13 | 14 | 14 | 14 | 15 | 15 | 15 | 14 | 15 | 15 | 15 |
| Békéscsaba | 7 | 9 | 11 | 10 | 10 | 9 | 11 | 12 | 11 | 12 | 12 | 13 | 15 | 16 | 16 | 14 | 14 | 15 | 14 | 14 | 13 | 13 | 13 | 13 | 14 | 14 | 15 | 16 | 16 | 16 |

| Nemzeti Bajnokság II champion Promotion to Nemzeti Bajnokság I |
| Promotion to Nemzeti Bajnokság I |
| Relegation to Nemzeti Bajnokság III |

Updated to match(es) played on 6 August 2025. Source: Hungarian Football Federation

== Statistics ==
=== Top goalscorers ===
As of 28 July 2025

| Rank | Player | Club | Goals |
|---|---|---|---|
| 1 | (Hungary) Zsolt Magyar | Csákvár | 3 |
| 1 | (Hungary) Kornél Csernik | BVSC | 2 |
| 1 | (Hungary) Attila Grünwald | Tiszakécske | 2 |
| 1 | (Hungary) József Szalai | Mezőkövesd | 2 |
| 1 | (Hungary) Ádám Szamosi | Honvéd | 2 |
| 1 | (Hungary) Ákos Zuigéber | Honvéd | 2 |
| 7 | 21 players | | 1 |

=== Hat-tricks ===
(H) = Home; (A) = Away;

| Player | For | Against | Score | Result | Round | Date |
|---|---|---|---|---|---|---|
| Filip Borsos | Békéscsaba | Vasas (A) | 33' 2–1, 45' 2–2, (74.) 3–3 | 4–3 | 3 | 11 August 2025 |
| Csanád Novák | Szeged | Tiszakécske (A) | 3' 0–1, 19' 0–2, 39' 0–4 | 1–4 | 4 | 17 August 2025 |

=== Attendances ===
Ranked by average attendances.

| Pos | Team | Total | High | Low | Average | Change |
|---|---|---|---|---|---|---|
| 1 | Honvéd | 47,292 | 5,113 | 2,071 | 3,378 | +48.7% |
| 2 | Videoton | 39,035 | 7,042 | 1,508 | 2,788 | −14.8%^{1} |
| 3 | Vasas | 24,339 | 4,016 | 1,428 | 1,872 | +18.6% |
| 4 | Kecskemét | 17,502 | 2,127 | 763 | 1,346 | −49.9%^{1} |
| 5 | Szeged | 13,826 | 1,812 | 681 | 1,064 | +11.4% |
| 6 | Karcag | 11,290 | 2,000 | 500 | 868 | n/a^{2} |
| 7 | Békéscsaba | 11,875 | 1,915 | 530 | 848 | −9.0% |
| 8 | Ajka | 9,850 | 1,500 | 350 | 704 | −12.0% |
| 9 | Kozármisleny | 8,600 | 900 | 300 | 662 | −7.2% |
| 10 | Tiszakécske | 7,450 | 1,500 | 200 | 573 | n/a^{2} |
| 11 | Budafok | 7,771 | 1,200 | 271 | 555 | +13.7% |
| 12 | Mezőkövesd | 6,900 | 1,000 | 300 | 531 | −35.2% |
| 13 | Szenlőrinc | 7,400 | 1,200 | 300 | 529 | −12.9% |
| 14 | Soroksár | 5,300 | 800 | 200 | 442 | +2.1% |
| 15 | Csákvár | 4,400 | 300 | 300 | 338 | +20.3% |
| 16 | BVSC | 4,225 | 868 | 128 | 325 | −18.5% |
| | League total | 227,955! | 7,042 | 128 | 1,070 | +22.7% |

Updated to games played on 2 May 2026, after Round 27
Source: magyarfutball (in Hungarian)
Notes:
1: Team played last season in Nemzeti Bajnokság I
2: Team played last season in Nemzeti Bajnokság III

== See also ==
- 2025–26 in Hungarian football
- 2025–26 Magyar Kupa
- 2025–26 Nemzeti Bajnokság I
- 2025–26 Nemzeti Bajnokság III
- 2025–26 Megyei Bajnokság I
