= 2026–27 Nemzeti Bajnokság I =

OTP Bank Liga
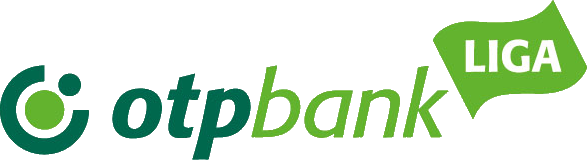
- Season: 2026–27
- Dates: 24 July 2026 – 23 May 2027
- Matches: 83
- Goals: 246 (2.96 per match)
- Top goalscorer: Á. Szendrei with 9 goals
- Biggest home win: 5 goals, Vasas 5–0 Zalaegerszeg; Round 3 (8 August 2026)
- Biggest away win: 4 goals, Nyíregyháza 2–6 Debrecen; Round 14 (22 November 2026)
- Highest scoring: 8 goals, Nyíregyháza 2–6 Debrecen; Round 14 (22 November 2026)
- Longest winning run: 5 matches by Debrecen
- Longest unbeaten run: 11 matches by Ferencváros
- Longest winless run: 7 matches by Kisvárda
- Longest losing run: 4 matches by Zalaegerszeg
- Highest attendance: 20,107 (Round 7, Ferencváros–Újpest)
- Lowest attendance: 500 (Round 12, Kispest-Honvéd–Kisvárda)
- Total attendance: 349,102
- Average attendance: 4,206
- All statistics correct as of 22 November 2026, Round 14 (6 of 6 matches).

The 2026–27 Nemzeti Bajnokság I (also known as 2026–27 OTP Bank Liga), also known as NB I, is the 128th season of top-tier football in Hungary. The league was officially named OTP Bank Liga for sponsorship reasons. The season began on 24 July 2026 and is scheduled to end on 23 May 2027.

Győr are entering the season as the defending champions, having won their 5th title last season.

Starting with the 2026–27 season, the last-placed team in the Nemzeti Bajnokság I is automatically relegated, while the second-last placed team enters a one-legged relegation play-off against the runners-up of the Nemzeti Bajnokság II. The match is played at a neutral venue, preferably situated at a similar distance from both clubs, with the winner securing a place in the following season's Nemzeti Bajnokság I. The venue must also satisfy the requirements for the use of the VAR system.

== Teams ==
=== Changes ===
Twelve teams are competing in the league – the top ten teams from the previous season and the two teams promoted from the Nemzeti Bajnokság II. The promoted teams are Vasas and Kispest-Honvéd, who returned to the top flight after respective absences of three years. They replaced Diósgyőr and Kazincbarcika, who were relegated to the Nemzeti Bajnokság II after respective spells of three and one years in the top flight.

▲ from 2025–26 Nemzeti Bajnokság II	▼ to 2026–27 Nemzeti Bajnokság II
Vasas (promoted after a three-year absence); Kispest-Honvéd (promoted after a three-year absence)	Diósgyőr (relegated after three years in the top flight); Kazincbarcika (relegated after one-year in the top flight)

=== Stadium and locations ===
Following is the list of clubs that are competing in the league this season, with their location, stadium and stadium capacity.

Team	Location	Stadium	Capacity	2025–26	2026–27
Debrecen	Debrecen	Nagyerdei Stadion	20,340	4th	details
Ferencváros	Budapest (Ferencváros)	Groupama Aréna	22,043	2nd	details
ETO Győr	Győr	ETO Park	15,600	1st	details
Kispest-Honvéd	Budapest (Kispest)	Bozsik Aréna	8,200	2nd (NB II)	
Kisvárda	Kisvárda	Várkerti Stadion	2,850	8th	
MTK	Budapest (Józsefváros)	Hidegkuti Nándor Stadion	5,014	10th	
Nyíregyháza	Nyíregyháza	Városi Stadion	8,150	9th	
Paks	Paks	Fehérvári úti Stadion	6,150	3rd	details
Puskás Akadémia	Felcsút	Pancho Aréna	3,816	6th	
Újpest	Budapest (Újpest)	Szusza Ferenc Stadion	12,670	7th	
Vasas	Budapest (Angyalföld)	Illovszky Rudolf Stadion	5,154	1st (NB II)	
Zalaegerszeg	Zalaegerszeg	ZTE Aréna	11,200	5th	

Debrecen	Ferencváros	ETO Győr	Kispest-Honvéd
Nagyerdei Stadion	Groupama Aréna	ETO Park	Bozsik Aréna
Capacity: 20,340	Capacity: 22,043	Capacity: 15,600	Capacity: 8,200
Kisvárda	Location of teams in 2026–27 Nemzeti Bajnokság I Location of Budapest teams		MTK
Várkerti Stadion	Location of teams in 2026–27 Nemzeti Bajnokság I Location of Budapest teams		Hidegkuti Nándor Stadion
Capacity: 3,385	Location of teams in 2026–27 Nemzeti Bajnokság I Location of Budapest teams		Capacity: 5,014
Nyíregyháza	Location of teams in 2026–27 Nemzeti Bajnokság I Location of Budapest teams		Paks
Városi Stadion	Location of teams in 2026–27 Nemzeti Bajnokság I Location of Budapest teams		Fehérvári úti Stadion
Capacity: 8,150	Location of teams in 2026–27 Nemzeti Bajnokság I Location of Budapest teams		Capacity: 6,150
Puskás Akadémia	Újpest	Vasas	Zalaegerszeg
Pancho Aréna	Szusza Ferenc Stadion	Illovszky Rudolf Stadion	ZTE Arena
Capacity: 3,816	Capacity: 12,670	Capacity: 5,154	Capacity: 11,200

==== Number of teams by counties and regions ====
Number of teams by counties
Pos.	County (megye)	No. of teams	Teams
1	Budapest	5	Ferencváros, Kispest-Honvéd, MTK, Újpest and Vasas
2	Szabolcs-Szatmár-Bereg	2	Kisvárda and Nyíregyháza
3	Fejér	1	Puskás Akadémia
3	Győr-Moson-Sopron	1	ETO Győr
3	Hajdú-Bihar	1	Debrecen
3	Tolna	1	Paks
3	Zala	1	Zalaegerszeg

Number of teams by regions
Transdanubia	Central Hungary	Great Plain and North
ETO Győr; Paks; Puskás Akadémia; Zalaegerszeg	Ferencváros; Kispest-Honvéd; MTK; Újpest; Vasas	Debrecen; Kisvárda; Nyíregyháza
4 Teams	5 Teams	3 Teams

=== Personnel and kits ===
All teams were obligated to have the logo of the league sponsor OTP Bank as well as the Nemzeti Bajnokság I logo on the right side of their shirt. Hungarian national sports betting brand Tippmix sponsored all 12 teams of the first league since February 2019, their logo were present on all team kits.

Note: Flags indicate national team as has been defined under FIFA eligibility rules. Players and Managers may hold more than one non-FIFA nationality.

Team	Head coach	Captain	Kit maker	Kit sponsors	
Team	Head coach	Captain	Kit maker	Main	Other(s)
Debrecen	(Estonia) Gert Remmel	(Hungary) Balázs Dzsudzsák	Adidas	Tranzit-Food	None
ETO Győr	(Mexico) Efraín Juárez	(Romania) Paul Anton	Macron	Kukkonia	None
Ferencváros	(Slovakia) Balázs Borbély	(Hungary) Dénes Dibusz	Macron	Telekom	List: Front: Midea; Back: iForex Europe, Superz.; Sleeves: Groupama and MVM; Shorts: MVM and VW
Kispest-Honvéd	(Switzerland) Maurizio Jacobacci	(Hungary) Ádám Szamosi	Macron	Vulcan Shield Global	None
Kisvárda	(Hungary) Attila Kuttor	(Bosnia and Herzegovina) Jasmin Mešanović	Adidas	Master Good	None
MTK	(Hungary) Imre Szabics	(Hungary) Mihály Kata	Nike	Prohuman	List: Back: Hilaris Hotels; Sleeves: HR-Rent; Back: 11teamsports
Nyíregyháza	(Hungary) István Szabó	(Hungary) Dominik Nagy	Macron	Révész Group	List: Sleeves: City of Nyíregyháza
Paks	(Hungary) György Bognár	(Hungary) Dániel Böde	Nike	None	List: Shorts: tarr
Puskás Akadémia	(Hungary) Levente Babó	(Hungary) Roland Szolnoki	2Rule	MBH Bank	None
Újpest	(Hungary) Zoltán Szélesi	(Serbia) Matija Ljujić	Puma	MOL	List: Sleeves: Toyota Schiller
Vasas	(Hungary) Gábor Erős	(Slovakia) Jozef Urblík	Adidas		None
Zalaegerszeg	(Portugal) Filipe Çelikkaya	(Hungary) Norbert Szendrei	Joma	ZÁÉV	List: Sleeves: City of Zalaegerszeg

==== Managerial changes ====
Team	Outgoing manager	Manner of departure	Date of vacancy	Position in table	Incoming manager	Date of appointment	Ref.
Debrecen	(Spain) Sergio Navarro	Mutual agreement	16 May 2026	Pre-season	(Estonia) Gert Remmel	3 June 2026	
Kisvárda	(Hungary) Attila Révész	Mutual agreement	21 May 2026	Pre-season	(Hungary) Attila Supka	21 May 2026	
Kispest-Honvéd	(Hungary) Tamás Feczkó	Mutual agreement	22 May 2026	Pre-season	(Switzerland) Maurizio Jacobacci	6 June 2026	
Ferencváros	(Republic of Ireland) Robbie Keane	Mutual agreement	23 May 2026	Pre-season	(Slovakia) Balázs Borbély	1 June 2026	
ETO Győr	(Slovakia) Balázs Borbély	Mutual agreement	29 May 2026	Pre-season	(Mexico) Efraín Juárez	19 June 2026	
Puskás Akadémia	(Slovakia) Zsolt Hornyák	Mutual agreement	1 June 2026	Pre-season	(Hungary) Levente Babó	3 June 2026	
Zalaegerszeg	(Portugal) Nuno Campos	Mutual agreement	6 June 2026	Pre-season	(Portugal) Filipe Çelikkaya	22 June 2026	
MTK	(Hungary) Máté Pinezits	Sacked	3 November 2026	10th of 12	(Hungary) Imre Szabics	16 November 2026	
Kisvárda	(Hungary) Attila Supka	Mutual agreement	8 November 2026	12th of 12	(Hungary) Attila Kuttor	9 November 2026	

== League table ==
Pos	Team	Pld	W	D	L	GF	GA	GD	Pts	Qualification or relegation
1	ETO Győr	14	7	5	2	25	16	+9	26	Qualification for the Champions League second qualifying round
2	Debrecen	14	7	4	3	30	20	+10	25	Qualification for the Conference League second qualifying round
3	Puskás Akadémia	14	8	0	6	19	17	+2	24	Qualification for the Conference League second qualifying round
4	Ferencváros	13	6	5	2	23	13	+10	23	
5	Paks	14	6	2	6	25	24	+1	20	
6	Újpest	14	5	4	5	21	20	+1	19	
7	Vasas	14	4	5	5	20	19	+1	17	
8	Kispest-Honvéd	13	4	5	4	18	20	−2	17	
9	MTK	14	4	4	6	20	28	−8	16	
10	Zalaegerszeg	14	4	2	8	17	24	−7	14	
11	Kisvárda	14	2	7	5	12	15	−3	13	Qualification for the relegation play-off
12	Nyíregyháza	14	3	3	8	16	30	−14	12	Relegation to the Nemzeti Bajnokság II

Updated to match(es) played on 22 November 2026, Round 14 (6 and 6 matches). Source: Hungarian Football Federation (in Hungarian)
Rules for classification: 1) Points; 2) Matches won; 3) Goal difference; 4) Goals scored (GF); 5) Head-to-head points; 6) Head-to-head goal difference; 7) Fair play ranking; 8) Drawing of lots.

== Results ==
Home \ Away	DEB	FER	GYO	KHO	KIS	MTK	NYI	PAK	PUS	UJP	VAS	ZAL	DEB	FER	GYO	KHO	KIS	MTK	NYI	PAK	PUS	UJP	VAS	ZAL
Debrecen			1–1			2–2	1–0		0–2	3–1	2–4	3–0												
Ferencváros	1–1		1–3			5–0 ^{a}		2–0		2–2 ^{a}	0–0													
ETO Győr		0–3		3–2			4–0		0–1	1–0	2–2	3–0												
Kispest-Honvéd	0–2				1–0	3–3		2–1		1–1	1–2	1–0												
Kisvárda	0–0	1–1	1–1	1–1				0–1	0–1	2–4														
MTK		a	1–2	2–2	1–2		2–1		2–3		1–0	3–0												
Nyíregyháza	2–6	1–1	1–1	0–1	2–1			1–1		2–1														
Paks	2–4	4–2	1–2	2–2		3–0				2–0		2–1												
Puskás Akadémia	1–3	1–2		3–1	0–2	1–2	1–2	3–2																
Újpest	4–2	a			0–0	1–1	2–1		0–1		3–1	2–1												
Vasas		0–2	2–2		1–1		3–2	0–2	0–1			5–0												
Zalaegerszeg		0–1			1–1	3–0	5–1	5–2	1–0		0–0													

Updated to match(es) played on 22 November 2026, Round 14 (6 of 6 matches). Source: Hungarian Football Federation (in Hungarian)
Legend: Blue = home team win; Yellow = draw; Red = away team win.
For upcoming matches, an "a" indicates there is an article about the rivalry between the two participants.

== Results by round ==
Team ╲ Round	1	2	3	4	5	6	7	8	9	10	11	12	13	14	15	16	17	18	19	20	21	22	23	24	25	26	27	28	29	30	31	32	33
Debrecen	L	L	W	D	D	D	W	L	D	W	W	W	W	W																			
Ferencváros	L	D	W	W	P	W	D	D	D	D	W	W	W	L																			
ETO Győr	D	W	L	D	W	D	W	W	L	W	W	D	D	W																			
Kispest-Honvéd	D	D	D	L	P	W	L	L	D	W	L	W	D	W																			
Kisvárda	D	W	L	L	D	D	W	L	D	D	D	L	L	D																			
MTK	W	D	L	D	W	D	L	L	L	W	L	L	D	W																			
Nyíregyháza	W	L	L	W	L	D	L	D	L	L	W	L	D	L																			
Paks	W	L	D	L	W	D	L	W	W	L	W	L	W	L																			
Puskás Akadémia	W	L	W	W	W	L	L	W	W	W	L	L	W	L																			
Újpest	L	W	W	D	L	W	D	W	D	L	L	W	L	D																			
Vasas	D	D	W	W	L	L	W	W	D	L	L	D	L	D																			
Zalaegerszeg	L	W	L	L	L	L	W	L	W	L	D	W	L	D																			

Source: Hungarian Football Federation (in Hungarian)
W = Win; D = Draw; L = Loss; P = Postponed

== Positions by round ==
The table lists the positions of teams after each week of matches. To preserve chronological evolvements, any postponed matches are not included in the round at which they were originally scheduled, but added to the full round they were played immediately afterwards.

Team ╲ Round	1	2	3	4	5	6	7	8	9	10	11	12	13	14	15	16	17	18	19	20	21	22	23	24	25	26	27	28	29	30	31	32	33
ETO Győr	5	1	5	7	3	4	2	2	2	2	2	1	3	1																			
Debrecen	11	12	9	10	10	11	8	9	8	7	5	4	4	2																			
Puskás Akadémia	3	6	2	1	1	1	1	1	1	1	1	2	1	3																			
Ferencváros^{ǂ}	10	11	6	4	5	3	5	5	6	6	4	3	2	4																			
Paks	2	7	8	9	7	7	9	6	5	5	3	6	5	5																			
Újpest	9	4	1	3	6	2	4	4	4	4	7	5	6	6																			
Vasas	6	10	3	2	2	6	3	3	3	3	6	7	7	7																			
Kispest-Honvéd^{ǂ}	7	9	12	12	12	9	12	12	12	10	12	9	8	8																			
MTK	1	2	4	6	4	5	6	7	10	8	8	10	10	9																			
Zalaegerszeg	12	5	11	11	11	12	11	11	9	11	11	8	9	10																			
Kisvárda	8	3	7	8	9	10	7	8	7	9	9	11	12	11																			
Nyíregyháza	4	8	10	5	8	8	10	10	11	12	10	12	11	12																			

Leader and qualification for the Champions League first qualifying round
Qualification for the Conference League second qualifying round
Qualification for the relegation play-off
Relegation to the Nemzeti Bajnokság II

Updated to match(es) played on 22 November 2026 • Note: ^{ǂ}Ferencváros and ^{ǂ}Kispest-Honvéd have 1–1 postponed match. Source: Hungarian Football Federation (in Hungarian)

== Relegation play-off ==
The relegation play-off will take place on 29 May 2027.

== Season statistics ==
As of match played 22 November 2026

=== Top goalscorers ===
Source: MLSZ Adatbank

Rank	Player	Club	Goals
1	(Hungary) Ákos Szendrei	Debrecen	9
2	(Hungary) Gábor Jurek	MTK	8
3	(Hungary) Milán Pető	Paks	7
3	(Hungary) József Szalai	Paks	7
5	(Slovenia) Aljoša Matko	Újpest	6
5	(Hungary) András Németh	Puskás Akadémia	6
7	(Montenegro) Viktor Đukanović	ETO Győr	5
7	(Bosnia and Herzegovina) Luka Kulenović	ETO Győr	5
7	(Slovakia) Jozef Urblík	Vasas	5
7	(Nigeria) Bamidele Yusuf	Ferencváros	5

=== Festest goal ===
Time	Player	Club	Against	Date	Round	Ref.
0:28	(Bosnia and Herzegovina) Luka Kulenović	ETO Győr	Ferencváros	21 November 2026	Round 14	

=== Hat-tricks ===
(H) = Home; (A) = Away;

Player	For	Against	Score	Result	Round	Date
Ákos Szendrei	Debrecen	Nyíregyháza (A)	30' 1–0, 57' 3–1, 80' 5–1	6–2	14	22 November 2026

== See also ==
- 2026–27 Megyei Bajnokság I
- 2026–27 Magyar Kupa
