= József Szalai (footballer) =

Hungarian footballer (born 2002)

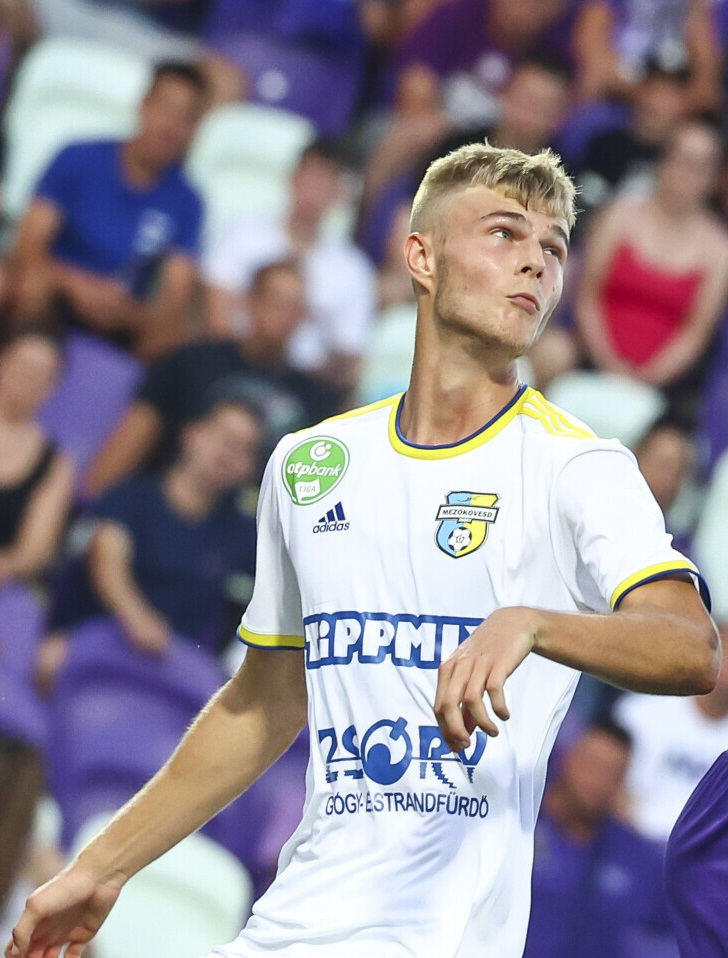
- Szalai playing for Mezőkövesd in 2023

Personal information
- Date of birth: 11 November 2002 (age 23)
- Place of birth: Kecskemét, Hungary
- Height: 1.94 m (6 ft 4 in)
- Position: Forward

Team information
- Current team: Mezőkövesd (on loan from Paks)
- Number: 9

Youth career
- 2011–2014: Hírös-Ép
- 2014–2018: Kecskeméti LC
- 2018–2021: Kecskemét
- 2021: Vasas

Senior career*
Years	Team	Apps	(Gls)
2019–2021	Kecskemét	17	(3)
2021–2023	Vasas	13	(1)
2021–2022	→ Kecskemét (loan)	9	(1)
2022–2023	→ Dorog (loan)	25	(5)
2023–2025	Mezőkövesd	48	(13)
2025–	Paks	5	(6)
2025–26	→ Mezőkövesd (loan)	27	(11)

International career^{‡}
2023	Hungary U21	1	(0)
2026–	Hungary	1	(0)
- * Club domestic league appearances and goals as of 31 May 2026 ‡ National team caps and goals as of 5 October 2026

József Szalai (born 11 November 2002) is a Hungarian professional footballer who plays as a forward for Nemzeti Bajnokság I club Paks and the Hungary national team.

== Career ==
On 27 June 2025, Szalai signed a four-year contract with Nemzeti Bajnokság I club Paks from Mezőkövesd, before immediately returning to the latter on loan for the 2025–26 season.

== Career statistics ==
=== Club ===
As of match played 21 August 2026

Appearances and goals by club, season and competition
Club	Season	League			Magyar Kupa		Continental		Total	
Club	Season	Division	Apps	Goals	Apps	Goals	Apps	Goals	Apps	Goals
Kecskemét	2019–20	Nemzeti Bajnokság III	0	0	—		—		0	0
Kecskemét	2020–21	Nemzeti Bajnokság III	17	3	2	1	—		19	4
Kecskemét	Total		17	3	2	1	—		19	4
Vasas	2020–21	Nemzeti Bajnokság II	1	0	—		—		1	0
Vasas	2021–22	Nemzeti Bajnokság II	5	1	1	0	—		6	1
Vasas	2022–23	Nemzeti Bajnokság I	6	0	1	0	—		7	0
Vasas	2023–24	Nemzeti Bajnokság II	1	0	—		—		1	0
Vasas	Total		13	1	2	0	—		15	1
Kecskemét (loan)	2021–22	Nemzeti Bajnokság II	9	1	2	4	—		11	5
Dorog (loan)	2022–23	Nemzeti Bajnokság II	25	5	—		—		25	5
Vasas II	2022–23	Nemzeti Bajnokság III	5	3	—		—		5	3
Mezőkövesd	2023–24	Nemzeti Bajnokság I	21	3	1	0	—		22	3
Mezőkövesd	2024–25	Nemzeti Bajnokság II	27	10	3	0	—		30	10
Mezőkövesd	Total		48	13	4	0	—		52	13
Mezőkövesd (loan)	2025–26	Nemzeti Bajnokság II	27	11	2	2	—		29	13
Paksi	2026–27	Nemzeti Bajnokság I	5	6	0	0	2	0	7	6
Career total			149	43	12	7	2	0	163	50

=== International ===
Appearances and goals by national team and year
Team	Year	Total	
Team	Year	Apps	Goals
Hungary U21	2023	1	0
Career total		1	0

== Honours ==
Vasas

- Nemzeti Bajnokság II: 2021–22
