= Attila Varga =

Hungarian footballer (born 1969)

- Varga with Karcag in 2025

Personal information
- Date of birth: 6 June 1969 (age 57)
- Place of birth: Gyöngyös, Hungary
- Height: 1.88 m (6 ft 2 in)
- Position: Defender

Team information
- Current team: Karcag (manager)

Senior career*
Years	Team	Apps	(Gls)
1988–1989	Volán		
1989–1993	Újpest	22	(0)
1993–1994	Rákospalota	24	(0)
1994–1996	Hatvan	56	(8)
1996–1998	Csepel	51	(2)
1998–2000	Dunakeszi	60	(1)
2000–2008	BKV Előre	190	(9)
2009	Csomád	7	(0)
Total		410	(20)

Managerial career
- 2010–2012: Rákosmente
- 2012–2015: Soroksár
- 2015: Mezőkövesd (assistant)
- 2015: Mezőkövesd (caretaker)
- 2015–2016: Cegléd
- 2017: Hatvan
- 2017–2018: Siófok
- 2019: Gyöngyös
- 2020–2021: MTK women
- 2021–2023: Kazincbarcika
- 2023–: Karcag
- * Club domestic league appearances and goals

Attila Varga (born 6 June 1969) is a Hungarian football manager and former professional player who is currently the manager of Nemzeti Bajnokság II club Karcag.

== Club career ==
In July 1991, while playing for Nemzeti Bajnokság I club Újpest, Varga was permitted to train with fellow Nemzeti Bajnokság I club Váci Izzó and play for the latter in its Intertoto Cup matches, but ultimately did not sign for the club.

== Managerial career ==
=== Rákosmente ===
Varga managed Nemzeti Bajnokság III club Rákosmente for two and a half years before his dismissal on 15 October 2012. The club's management withdrew its confidence in him following his conduct during and after a match against Tápiószecső, during which he was sent off for arguing with the referee. He was replaced by Pál Endrész, who took charge of the team's training session on the day of his appointment.

=== Soroksár ===
Varga managed Nemzeti Bajnokság II club Soroksár before leaving by mutual consent on 23 March 2015. His departure followed a disappointing start to the spring season, during which the team collected three points from five matches and dropped to tenth place in the league standings.

=== Mezőkövesd ===
On 25 March 2015, Varga joined Nemzeti Bajnokság II club Mezőkövesd as assistant manager to Tamás Lucsánszky, who had replaced László Tóth following the team's 3–2 defeat against Szolnok. Following Lucsánszky's resignation on 19 May, Varga was appointed caretaker manager for the remaining two matches of the season. Lucsánszky's resignation came after the team lost three consecutive matches and were eliminated from contention for promotion. Under Lucsánszky, Mezőkövesd had collected 12 points from eight matches. The team stood fourth in the league standings.

=== Cegléd ===
On 25 June 2015, Varga was appointed manager of Nemzeti Bajnokság III East Group club Cegléd for the 2015–16 season. He led the team to promotion to the Nemzeti Bajnokság II. In September 2016, he became unable to perform his duties because of illness, and János Krecska took over as manager on 29 September. Varga subsequently left Cegléd, with the termination of his contract completed in early November 2016. The club's management had informed him after a match against Szeged that he would be transferred to another position. Varga later stated that the team had started well following promotion but that he had lost the management's confidence after a poor run of results.

=== Hatvan ===
On 1 March 2017, Varga was appointed manager of Nemzeti Bajnokság III East Group club Hatvan, replacing Gábor Híres, who had been dismissed because of the team's disappointing league performance. Varga was unable to prevent relegation, as Hatvan finished 16th in the 18-team division with 40 points. During his 14 league matches in charge, the team recorded five wins, four draws and five defeats, collecting 19 points. Varga left the club on 14 June 2017, stating that differences between his professional approach and the conditions at the club had hindered his work.

=== Siófok ===
On 28 September 2017, Varga was appointed manager of Nemzeti Bajnokság II club Siófok, replacing László Disztl. Having taken charge when the team were in a relegation position, he guided Siófok to 13th place in the 2017–18 season, securing their second-division status. On 11 June 2018, he signed a new contract for one year, with an option for an additional year. However, he was dismissed on 4 September after Siófok dropped to 18th place following a run of three defeats, two draws and one win in their opening six league matches.

=== Gyöngyös ===
Varga took charge of Nemzeti Bajnokság III East Group club Gyöngyös for the 2019–20 season. He left the club after six months, having guided the team to a position above tenth place at the halfway stage of the season, although they collected 19 points against a target of 24.

=== MTK women ===
On 11 December 2019, Varga became manager of Nemzeti Bajnokság I women's club MTK, replacing interim manager László Vass. He signed a one-and-a-half-year contract with the club, effective from 1 January 2020. Varga left MTK by mutual consent on 7 January 2021 after one year in charge.

=== Kazincbarcika ===
On 3 June 2021, Varga was appointed manager of Kazincbarcika, which had been relegated from the Nemzeti Bajnokság II. The club set the target of winning the Nemzeti Bajnokság III and securing promotion back to the second division after one season. On 7 February 2023, Kazincbarcika relieved Varga of his managerial duties while competing in the Nemzeti Bajnokság II. Assistant manager László Simon and the coaching staff temporarily took charge of training while the club considered his successor.

=== Karcag ===
On 12 September 2023, Varga was appointed manager of Nemzeti Bajnokság III Northeast Group club Karcag, replacing László Csillag, whose contract had been terminated by mutual consent after 12 matches. Karcag were 12th in their division with seven points at the time of his appointment.

== Career statistics ==
Appearances and goals by club, season and competition
Club	Season	League			Magyar Kupa		Europe		Other		Total	
Club	Season	Division	Apps	Goals	Apps	Goals	Apps	Goals	Apps	Goals	Apps	Goals
Újpest	1989–90	Nemzeti Bajnokság I	6	0			—		—		6	0
Újpest	1990–91	Nemzeti Bajnokság I	11	0			2 (Note: Appearances in European Cup)	0	—		13	0
Újpest	1991–92	Nemzeti Bajnokság I	5	0			—		—		5	0
Újpest	1992–93	Nemzeti Bajnokság I	—		3	0	—		—		3	0
Újpest	Total		22	0	3	0	2	0	—		27	0
Váci Izzó	1991–92	Nemzeti Bajnokság I	—		—		2 (Note: Appearances in Intertoto Cup)	0	—		2	0
Rákospalota	1993–94	Nemzeti Bajnokság II	24	0	2	0	—		—		26	0
Hatvan	1994–95	Nemzeti Bajnokság II	27	2	—		—		—		27	2
Hatvan	1995–96	Nemzeti Bajnokság II	29	6	—		—		—		29	6
Hatvan	Total		56	8	—		—		—		56	8
Csepel	1996–97	Nemzeti Bajnokság I	28	2	3	0	—		—		31	2
Csepel	1997–98	Nemzeti Bajnokság II	23	0	3	1	—		—		26	1
Csepel	Total		51	2	6	1	—		—		57	3
Dunakeszi	1998–99	Nemzeti Bajnokság III	24	0	4	0	—		—		28	0
Dunakeszi	1999–2000	Nemzeti Bajnokság II	36	1	—		—		—		36	1
Dunakeszi	Total		60	1	4	0	—		—		64	1
BKV Előre	2000–01	Nemzeti Bajnokság II	16	1	5	0	—		—		21	1
BKV Előre	2001–02	Nemzeti Bajnokság II	29	1	3	1	—		—		32	2
BKV Előre	2002–03	Nemzeti Bajnokság II	26	3	6	0	—		—		32	3
BKV Előre	2003–04	Nemzeti Bajnokság II	20	0	1	0	—		—		21	0
BKV Előre	2004–05	Nemzeti Bajnokság II	25	1	6	0	—		—		31	1
BKV Előre	2005–06	Nemzeti Bajnokság II	25	0	4	0	—		—		29	0
BKV Előre	2006–07	Nemzeti Bajnokság II	24	1			—		—		24	1
BKV Előre	2007–08	Nemzeti Bajnokság II	25	2	1	0	—		—		26	2
BKV Előre	Total		190	9	26	1	—		—		216	10
Csomád	2009–10	Megyei Bajnokság III	7	0	—		—		1 (Note: Appearance in Pest Megyei Kupa)	0	8	0
Career total			410	20	41	2	4	0	1	0	456	22

== Honours ==
=== Player ===
Újpest

- Nemzeti Bajnokság I: 1989–90
- Magyar Kupa: 1991–92
- Szuperkupa: 1992

Dunakeszi

- Nemzeti Bajnokság III – East: 1998–99

BKV Előre

- Nemzeti Bajnokság II – East: 2000–01

=== Manager ===
Soroksár

- Nemzeti Bajnokság III – Alföld: 2012–13
- Nemzeti Bajnokság III – Central: 2013–14

Kazincbarcika

- Nemzeti Bajnokság III – East: 2021–22

Karcag

- Nemzeti Bajnokság III – Northeast: 2024–25
