= Zsolt Haraszti =

Hungarian footballer (born 1991)

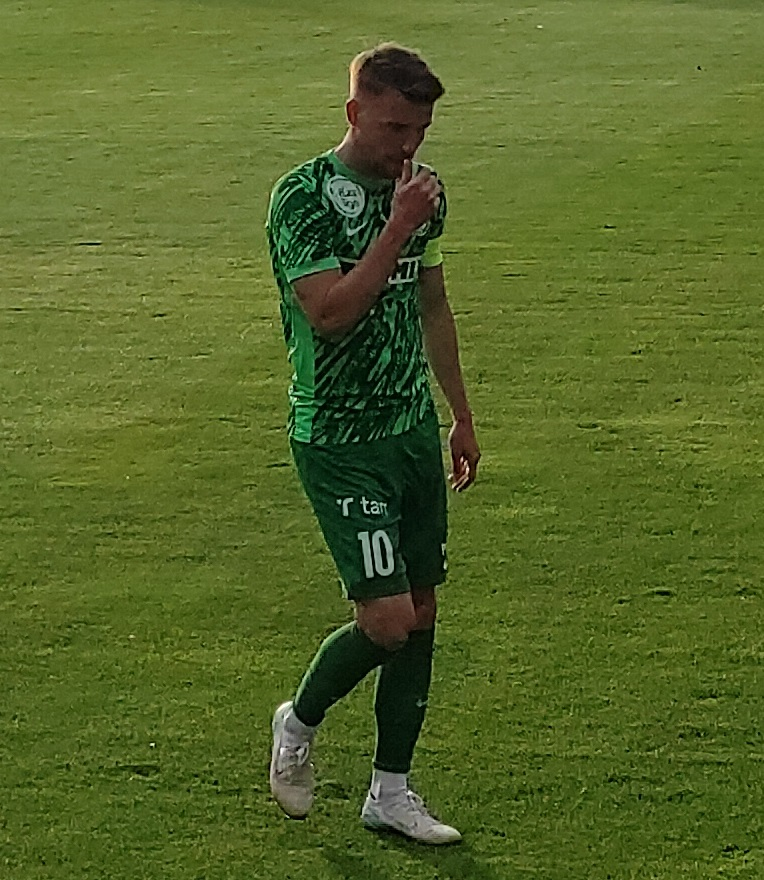
- Haraszti with Paks in 2025

Personal information
- Date of birth: 4 November 1991 (age 35)
- Place of birth: Budapest, Hungary
- Height: 1.81 m (5 ft 11 1/2 in)
- Position: Forward

Team information
- Current team: Fehérvár (on loan from Paks)
- Number: 10

Youth career
- 2002–2010: Paks

Senior career*
Years	Team	Apps	(Gls)
2010–2012	Paks	8	(0)
2011–2012	→ Siófok (loan)	16	(2)
2012–2014	Videoton	18	(3)
2012	→ Siófok (loan)	11	(3)
2013–2014	→ Puskás (loan)	10	(1)
2014–2015	Paks	24	(4)
2015–2016	Ferencváros	5	(0)
2016	Videoton	12	(0)
2016–	Paks	164	(15)
2021	→ MTK Budapest (loan)	5	(0)
2026–	→ Fehérvár (loan)	9	(0)

International career^{‡}
2011	Hungary U21	2	(1)
- * Club domestic league appearances and goals as of 31 May 2026 ‡ National team caps and goals as of 15 August 2012

Zsolt Haraszti (born 4 November 1991) is a Hungarian professional footballer, who plays as a forward for Fehérvár, on loan from Nemzeti Bajnokság I club Paks.

== Career ==
=== Paks ===
On 15 May 2024, he won the 2024 Magyar Kupa Final with Paks by beating Ferencváros 2–0 at the Puskás Aréna.

On 14 May 2025, he won the 2025 Magyar Kupa final with Paksi FC after beating Ferencvárosi TC 4–3 on penalty shoot-out.

== Career statistics ==
As of 15 May 2021

Appearances and goals by club, season and competition
Club	Season	League			Cup		League Cup		Europe		Total	
Club	Season	Division	Apps	Goals	Apps	Goals	Apps	Goals	Apps	Goals	Apps	Goals
Paks	2009–10	Nemzeti Bajnokság I	0	0	1	0	9	0	—		10	0
Paks	2010–11	Nemzeti Bajnokság I	8	0	2	0	7	1	—		17	1
Paks	2011–12	Nemzeti Bajnokság I	0	0	0	0	0	0	2	0	2	0
Paks	2014–15	Nemzeti Bajnokság I	24	4	0	0	3	1	—		27	5
Paks	2016–17	Nemzeti Bajnokság I	24	3	0	0	—		—		24	3
Paks	2017–18	Nemzeti Bajnokság I	20	2	1	1	—		—		21	3
Paks	2018–19	Nemzeti Bajnokság I	16	0	3	1	—		—		19	1
Paks	2019–20	Nemzeti Bajnokság I	10	2	3	0	—		—		13	2
Paks	2020–21	Nemzeti Bajnokság I	22	4	3	2	—		—		25	6
Paks	Total		124	15	13	4	19	2	2	0	158	21
Siófok	2011–12	Nemzeti Bajnokság I	27	5	0	0	0	0	—		27	5
Videoton	2012–13	Nemzeti Bajnokság I	7	1	3	0	3	2	0	0	13	3
Videoton	2013–14	Nemzeti Bajnokság I	11	2	0	0	4	1	0	0	15	3
Videoton	2014–15	Nemzeti Bajnokság I	0	0	1	0	0	0	—		1	0
Videoton	2015–16	Nemzeti Bajnokság I	12	0	2	0	—		0	0	14	0
Videoton	Total		30	3	6	0	7	3	0	0	43	6
Puskás	2013–14	Nemzeti Bajnokság I	10	1	3	1	3	1	—		16	3
Ferencváros	2015–16	Nemzeti Bajnokság I	5	0	1	0	—		1	1	7	1
Career total			196	24	23	5	29	6	3	1	251	36
