= 2021–22 Paksi FC season =

Paks
2021–22 season
- Chairman: János Süli
- Manager: György Bognár
- Stadium: Fehérvári úti Stadion
- Nemzeti Bajnokság I: 6th
- Hungarian Cup: Runners-up
- Top goalscorer: League: Martin Ádám (31); All: Martin Ádám (31)
- Highest home attendance: 4,201 vs Ferencváros (29 April 2022); Nemzeti Bajnokság I
- Lowest home attendance: 1,198 vs Puskás Akadémia (20 November 2021); Nemzeti Bajnokság I
- Average home league attendance: 1,827
- Biggest win: 9–1 vs Gyömrő (A) (18 September 2021); Hungarian Cup
- Biggest defeat: 0–3 vs Ferencváros (N) (11 May 2022); Hungarian Cup Final
Home colours	Away colours	Third colours

The 2021–22 season was Paksi Futball Club's 16th competitive season, 16th consecutive season in the OTP Bank Liga and 69th year in existence as a football club. In addition to the domestic league, Paks participated in this season's editions of the Hungarian Cup.

== Squad ==
As of match played 29 July 2021

No.	Name	Nationality	Position	Date of birth (age)	Signed from	Signed in	Apps.	Goals
Goalkeepers
1	Gergely Nagy	(Hungary)	GK	27 May 1994 (aged 27)	AEL	2021	26	0
25	Barnabás Simon	(Hungary)	GK	13 February 2004 (aged 17)	Szombathelyi Haladás	2021	0	0
31	Gergő Rácz	(Hungary)	GK	20 November 1995 (aged 25)	Ferencváros II	2016	54	0
TBA	Lajos Hegedűs	(Hungary)	GK	7 February 1989 (aged 32)	Balmazújváros	2019	19	0
Defenders
2	Ákos Kinyik	(Hungary)	DF	12 May 1993 (aged 28)	Debrecen	2021	0	0
4	Márton Lorentz	(Hungary)	DF	1 February 1995 (aged 26)	Siófok	2020	22	0
5	Zsolt Gévay	(Hungary)	DF	19 November 1987 (aged 33)	Mezőkövesd	2014	247	26
6	Norbert Szélpál	(Hungary)	DF	3 March 1996 (aged 25)	Békéscsaba	2020	27	1
11	Attila Osváth	(Hungary)	DF	10 December 1995 (aged 25)	Puskás Akadémia	2019	60	0
17	Dávid Kulcsár	(Hungary)	DF	25 February 1988 (aged 33)	Ferencváros	2012	215	9
24	Bence Lenzsér	(Hungary)	DF	9 April 1996 (aged 25)	Győr II	2019	154	6
30	János Szabó	(Hungary)	DF	11 July 1989 (aged 32)	youth sector	2008	343	22
TBA	Dávid Kelemen	(Hungary)	DF	24 May 1992 (aged 29)	Nyíregyháza	2018	14	1
Midfielders
8	Balázs Balogh	(Hungary)	MF	11 June 1990 (aged 31)	Puskás Akadémia	2019	56	5
14	István Bognár	(Hungary)	MF	5 May 1991 (aged 30)	MTK Budapest	2020	33	10
19	Barna Kesztyűs	(Hungary)	MF	4 September 1993 (aged 27)	Budapest Honvéd	2021	62	1
21	Kristóf Papp	(Hungary)	MF	14 May 1993 (aged 28)	Gyirmót	2015	155	16
22	József Windecker	(Hungary)	MF	2 December 1992 (aged 28)	Levadiakos	2018	78	10
26	Lajos Bertus	(Hungary)	MF	26 September 1990 (aged 30)	Mezőkövesd	2020	203	15
27	Bálint Szabó	(Hungary)	MF	18 January 2001 (aged 20)	Fehérvár II	2020	8	0
28	Richárd Nagy	(Hungary)	MF	8 April 1994 (aged 27)	Kaposvár	2020	27	4
Forwards
9	János Hahn	(Hungary)	FW	15 March 1995 (aged 26)	Puskás Akadémia	2014	234	65
10	Zsolt Haraszti	(Hungary)	FW	4 November 1991 (aged 29)	Fehérvár	2016	158	23
13	Dániel Böde	(Hungary)	FW	21 October 1986 (aged 34)	Ferencváros	2019	260	61
16	Martin Ádám	(Hungary)	FW	6 November 1994 (aged 26)	Kaposvár	2020	31	8
20	Máté Sajbán	(Hungary)	FW	19 December 1995 (aged 25)	Mezőkövesd	2020	50	9
23	Ákos Szendrei	(Hungary)	FW	23 January 2003 (aged 18)	youth sector	2019	13	2
29	Bence Pethő	(Hungary)	FW	1 November 1998 (aged 22)	Budaörs	2021	0	0
Players away on loan
Players who left during the season

== Transfers ==
=== Summer ===
In: Note: Flags indicate national team as defined under FIFA eligibility rules; some limited exceptions apply. Players may hold more than one non-FIFA nationality.

No.	Pos.	Nation	Player
1	GK	HUN	Gergely Nagy (from (Greece) AEL)
2	DF	HUN	Ákos Kinyik (from Debrecen)
5	DF	HUN	Olivér Tamás (from Fehérvár)
18	MF	HUN	Zoltán Sipos (loan return from Győr)
19	MF	HUN	Barna Kesztyűs (from Budapest Honvéd)
23	DF	SVK	Sinan Medgyes (from Budafok)
25	GK	HUN	Barnabás Simon (from Szombathelyi Haladás)
29	FW	HUN	Bence Pethő (from Budaörs)
88	GK	HUN	Vilmos Borsos (loan return from Dorog)
—	DF	HUN	Dávid Forgács (loan return from Szentlőrinc)
—	DF	HUN	Dávid Kelemen (loan return from (Romania) Csikszereda)

Out: Note: Flags indicate national team as defined under FIFA eligibility rules; some limited exceptions apply. Players may hold more than one non-FIFA nationality.

No.	Pos.	Nation	Player
2	DF	HUN	András Vági (to Mezőkövesd)
7	MF	HUN	Dénes Szakály (to Siófok)
9	FW	HUN	János Hahn (to (Slovakia) Dunajská Streda)
10	FW	HUN	Zsolt Haraszti (loan to MTK Budapest)
18	MF	HUN	Zoltán Sipos (to Szolnok)
19	GK	HUN	Ádám Holczer (to Tiszakécske)
23	FW	HUN	Ákos Szendrei (to (Slovakia) Dunajská Streda)
25	DF	HUN	Olivér Tamás (loan return to Fehérvár)
26	MF	HUN	Lajos Bertus (to Diósgyőr)
88	GK	HUN	Vilmos Borsos (loan to Diósgyőr)
—	DF	HUN	Dávid Forgács (to Győr)

=== Winter ===
In: Note: Flags indicate national team as defined under FIFA eligibility rules; some limited exceptions apply. Players may hold more than one non-FIFA nationality.

No.	Pos.	Nation	Player
10	FW	HUN	Zsolt Haraszti (loan return from MTK Budapest)
—	MF	HUN	Patrik Nyári (from Fehérvár)

Out: Note: Flags indicate national team as defined under FIFA eligibility rules; some limited exceptions apply. Players may hold more than one non-FIFA nationality.

No.	Pos.	Nation	Player
14	MF	HUN	István Bognár (to (Cyprus) Aris Limassol)
15	DF	HUN	Ákos Debreceni (loan to Szeged)
17	DF	HUN	Dávid Kulcsár (to III. Kerület)
—	MF	HUN	Patrik Nyári (loan to III. Kerület)

== Pre–season and friendlies ==
Win Draw Loss Fixtures

30 June 2021 Friendly	Paks	7–2	(Hungary) III. Kerület	Paks, Hungary
18:00 CEST	B. Szabó 30'; Windecker 56'; Bognár 60', 80'; Haraszti 67' (pen.); Ádám 70'	Report	Kokenszky 45'; Rajczi 86'	Stadium: Fehérvári úti Stadion

3 July 2021 Friendly	Paks	5–2	(Hungary) Pécs	Paks, Hungary
11:00 CEST	Bertus 16'; Sajbán 45+1'; Ádám 67', 86'; Haraszti 90'	Report	Tihanyi 60'; Bíró 72'	Stadium: Fehérvári úti Stadion

11 July 2021 Friendly	Paks	1–1	(Romania) Hermannstadt	Rogla, Slovenia
11:00 CEST	Böde 62'	Report	Balaure 44'

11 July 2021 Friendly	Paks	4–0	(Romania) Hermannstadt	Slovenske Konjice, Slovenia
17:30 CEST	Sajbán 8'; Ádám 18'; Szendrei 48', 87'	Report

14 July 2021 Friendly	Paks	2–2	(Bosnia and Herzegovina) Železničar Pančevo	Slovenske Konjice, Slovenia
17:00 CEST	Böde 80'; Haraszti 85'	Report	Konatar 70'; L. Marković 90'

15 July 2021 Friendly	Paks	1–2	(Czech Republic) Slovácko	Slovenske Konjice, Slovenia
17:00 CEST	Papp 11'	Report	Holzer 46'; Mareček 61'

17 July 2021 Friendly	Rogaška (Slovenia)	2–7	Paks	Slovenske Konjice, Slovenia
10:30 CEST	? ?	Report	Haraszti 12' (pen.); Ádám 42'; Debreceni 48'; Sajbán 53'; Hahn 69'; Gyurkits 71'; Süvöltős 76'

24 July 2021 Friendly	Paks	2–0	(Hungary) Budafok	Paks, Hungary
11:00 CEST	Ádám 2'; Böde 47'	Report		Stadium: Fehérvári úti Stadion

== Competitions ==
=== Overview ===
Competition	First match	Last match	Starting round	Final position	Record							
Competition	First match	Last match	Starting round	Final position	Pld	W	D	L	GF	GA	GD	Win %
Nemzeti Bajnokság I	30 July 2021	14 May 2022	Matchday 1	6th	33	12	7	14	75	63	+12	36.36
Hungarian Cup	18 September 2021	11 May 2022	Round of 64	Runners-up	6	5	0	1	20	4	+16	83.33
Total					39	17	7	15	95	67	+28	43.59

Source: Competitions

=== Nemzeti Bajnokság I ===
==== League table ====
Pos	Team	Pld	W	D	L	GF	GA	GD	Pts	Qualification or relegation
4	Fehérvár	33	13	9	11	48	43	+5	48	Qualification for the Europa Conference League second qualifying round (Note: Since the winners of the 2021–22 Magyar Kupa, Ferencváros, qualified for the Champions League, the Europa Conference League berth awarded to the Magyar Kupa winners was transferred to the highest-placed Nemzeti Bajnokság I team not already qualified for European competition, the fourth-placed team.)
5	Újpest	33	12	8	13	50	48	+2	44	
6	Paks	33	12	7	14	75	63	+12	43	
7	Debrecen	33	10	9	14	45	52	−7	39	
8	Zalaegerszeg	33	10	9	14	44	58	−14	39	

Source: Hungarian Football Federation (in Hungarian), Soccerway
Rules for classification: 1) Points; 2) Matches won; 3) Goal difference; 4) Goals scored; 5) Head-to-head points; 6) Head-to-head goal difference; 7) Head-to-head away goals scored; 8) Fair play ranking; 9) Drawing of lots.

==== Results summary ====
Overall								Home						Away					
Pld	W	D	L	GF	GA	GD	Pts	W	D	L	GF	GA	GD	W	D	L	GF	GA	GD
33	12	7	14	75	63	+12	43	7	2	8	37	32	+5	5	5	6	38	31	+7

Source: Soccerway

==== Results by round ====
Round	1	2	3	4	5	6	7	8	9	10	11	12	13	14	15	16	17	18	19	20	21	22	23	24	25	26	27	28	29	30	31	32	33
Ground	H	A	H	A	H	H	A	H	A	H	A	A	H	A	H	A	A	H	A	H	A	H	H	A	H	A	H	H	A	H	A	H	A
Result	L	W	D	L	W	W	W	L	L	D	L	L	W	D	L	L	W	W	W	L	D	W	W	L	L	D	L	W	W	L	D	L	D
Position	9	5	6	8	5	4	3	4	5	4	6	6	6	6	8	8	7	5	5	5	6	4	4	4	5	5	7	7	4	5	5	5	6

Source: Matches
A = Away; H = Home; W = Win; D = Draw; L = Loss

==== Matches ====
30 July 2021 1	Paks	2–3	Mezőkövesd	Paks
18:15 CEST (UTC+2)	Haraszti (yellow card) 27'; Kesztyűs (yellow card) 39'; Lorentz (yellow card) 50'; Sajbán 54'; Hahn 76'	Report	Farkaš (yellow card) 8'; Beširović 21'; Nagy (yellow card) 34'; Jurina 47'; Katanec (yellow card) 48'; Dražić (yellow card) 78'; Calcan 80'	Stadium: Fehérvári úti Stadion; Attendance: 1,311; Referee: Balázs Berke

8 August 2021 2	Puskás Akadémia	1–6	Paks	Felcsút
20:00 CEST (UTC+2)	Gera (yellow card) 35'; Nagy (red card) 42'; Plšek 55'; Nunes (red card) 87'	Report	Szélpál (yellow card) 13'; Sajbán 15', 66'; Bognár 37', 69'; Ádám 46'; Nagy 59'	Stadium: Pancho Aréna; Attendance: 782; Referee: Péter Antal

14 August 2021 3	Paks	3–3	Debrecen	Paks
16:00 CEST (UTC+2)	Kinyik (yellow card) 34'; Ádám 45'; Hahn 50'; Bognár 63'; Szélpál (yellow card) 72'	Report	Tischler (yellow card) 7'; Ferenczi 27'; Dzsudzsák 41'; Kusnyír (yellow card) 44'; Deslandes (yellow card) 62'; Ugrai 73'; Nikolić (yellow card) 86'	Stadium: Fehérvári úti Stadion; Attendance: 1,798; Referee: Péter Zierkelbach

21 August 2021 4	Budapest Honvéd	3–1	Paks	Budapest
20:30 CEST (UTC+2)	Lovrić (yellow card) 9'; Nagy 20', 57'; Pantelić (yellow card) 40'; Lukić 47'; Nono (red card) 68'	Report	Hahn 30' (pen.); Kinyik (yellow card) 44'; Böde (yellow card) 52'	Stadium: Bozsik Aréna; Attendance: 2,411; Referee: Csaba Pintér

29 August 2021 5	Paks	2–1	Újpest	Paks
20:00 CEST (UTC+2)	Ádám 3', (yellow card) 64'; Lenzsér (yellow card) 32'; Hahn 56' (pen.)	Report	Stieber 18'; Koutroumpis (yellow card) 55'; Croizet (yellow card) 90'	Stadium: Fehérvári úti Stadion; Attendance: 1,476; Referee: Ferenc Karakó

11 September 2021 6	Paks	3–2	MTK Budapest	Paks
17:45 CEST (UTC+2)	Ádám 8'; Medgyes (yellow card) 33'; Sajbán 37', 54'; G. Nagy (yellow card) 68'; Papp (yellow card) 75'	Report	Miovski (yellow card) 56', (goal) 75'; Dimitrov (yellow card) 68'; Grozav 70' (pen.)	Stadium: Fehérvári úti Stadion; Attendance: 1,411; Referee: Balázs Berke

24 September 2021 7	Zalaegerszeg	2–5	Paks	Zalaegerszeg
20:00 CEST (UTC+2)	Gergényi (yellow card) 36'; Babati (yellow card) 47'; Špoljarić 51'; Borukov (yellow card) 78', (goal) 90+4' (pen.)	Report	Ádám 15'; Serafimov 38' (o.g.); Kinyik 54'; Balogh 58'; Papp (yellow card) 70'; B. Szabó 84'	Stadium: ZTE Arena; Attendance: 1,214; Referee: Mihály Káprály

3 October 2021 8	Paks	1–3	Ferencváros	Paks
17:00 CEST (UTC+2)	Lenzsér (yellow card) 41'; Kinyik 63', (yellow card) 74'; Szélpál (red card) 73'; Böde (yellow card) 88'	Report	Bešić (yellow card) 16'; R. Mmaee 51' (pen.), 65', (yellow card) 89'; Wingo (yellow card) 71'; Laïdouni 74'	Stadium: Fehérvári úti Stadion; Attendance: 4,011; Referee: Tamás Bognár

16 October 2021 9	Gyirmót	2–1	Paks	Győr
14:45 CEST (UTC+2)	Simon 24', (yellow card) 37'; P. Nagy (yellow card) 58'; Hasani 68'; Hársfalvi (yellow card) 85'; Széles (yellow card) 90'	Report	Balogh (yellow card) 40'; Ádám 63'; Kinyik (yellow card) 90+3'	Stadium: Ménfői úti Stadion; Attendance: 1,024; Referee: Sándor Andó-Szabó

22 October 2021 10	Paks	2–2	Kisvárda	Paks
17:45 CEST (UTC+2)	Ádám 20' (pen.), (yellow card) 34'; Bognár 22'; Papp (yellow card) 27'	Report	Asani 4'; Navrátil (yellow card) 19', (goal) 65'; Mešanović (yellow card) 37'; Ćirković (yellow card) 71'; Simović (yellow card) 75'; Hey (yellow card) 83'; Melnyk (yellow card) 85'; Karabelyov (yellow card) 89'; Nagy (yellow card) 90+3'	Stadium: Fehérvári úti Stadion; Attendance: 1,245; Referee: Balázs Berke
Note: Bognár (yellow card) 25'

29 October 2021 11	Fehérvár	2–1	Paks	Székesfehérvár
19:45 CEST (UTC+2)	Petryak 16'; Szendrei (yellow card) 83'; Kodro 84'; Hangya (yellow card) 87'; Zivzivadze (yellow card) 88'	Report	Kesztyűs (yellow card) 15'; Szélpál (yellow card) 59'; Ádám 69'; Balogh (yellow card) 72'; Lenzsér (yellow card) 90+6'	Stadium: MOL Aréna Sóstó; Attendance: 1,905; Referee: Ádám Farkas

6 November 2021 12	Mezőkövesd	2–1	Paks	Mezőkövesd
14:45 CET (UTC+1)	Lakvekheliani (yellow card) 7'; Dražić 18'; Pillár (yellow card) 62'; Jurina 72'; Farkaš (yellow card) 75'; Madarász (yellow card) 79'; Vojtuš (yellow card) 90'	Report	Papp (yellow card) 14'; Sajbán 44'; Szélpál (yellow card) 61'	Stadium: Városi Stadion; Attendance: 1,426; Referee: Péter Antal

20 November 2021 13	Paks	4–1	Puskás Akadémia	Paks
12:30 CET (UTC+1)	Ádám 8'; Böde 26'; Bognár 46'; Medgyes (yellow card) 54'; Szélpál (yellow card) 58'; Windecker (yellow card) 67'; Sajbán 90'	Report	Corbu 87'	Stadium: Fehérvári úti Stadion; Attendance: 1,198; Referee: Ferenc Karakó

28 November 2021 14	Debrecen	1–1	Paks	Debrecen
13:30 CET (UTC+1)	Ugrai 20'; Bévárdi (yellow card) 37'	Report	Ádám 46'; Tamás (yellow card) 53'; Kinyik (yellow card) 90+2'; R. Nagy (yellow card) 90+2'	Stadium: Nagyerdei Stadion; Attendance: 2,433; Referee: Tamás Bognár

3 December 2021 15	Paks	2–3	Budapests Honvéd	Paks
20:00 CET (UTC+1)	Böde (yellow card) 5'; Ádám 6', 44' (pen.); Balogh (yellow card) 60'; Lenzsér (yellow card) 90+5'	Report	Lukić 36', 90+5' (pen.); Pantelić (yellow card) 43'; Hidi 47'; G. Nagy (yellow card) 90+2'	Stadium: Fehérvári úti Stadion; Attendance: 1,280; Referee: Balázs Berke

12 December 2021 16	Újpest	4–3	Paks	Budapest
13:30 CET (UTC+1)	Beridze 7', 43'; Csongvai 9'; Croizet 47'; Katona (yellow card) 48'	Report	Ádám 4' (pen.); Szélpál (yellow card) 27'; Böde 60'; Papp 83'; Lenzsér (yellow card) 90+1'	Stadium: Szusza Ferenc Stadion; Attendance: 1,161; Referee: Sándor Andó-Szabó

18 December 2021 17	MTK Budapest	1–4	Paks	Budapest
17:00 CET (UTC+1)	Miovski 16', (yellow card) 37'; Mezei (yellow card) 52'; Ramadani (yellow card) 70'	Report	Szabó 32', 53'; Ádám 45', 57'	Stadium: Hidegkuti Nándor Stadion; Attendance: 1,420; Referee: Péter Solymosi

29 January 2022 18	Paks	3–2	Zalaegerszeg	Paks
14:30 CET (UTC+1)	Bognár 11'; Ádám (yellow card) 13', (goal) 39', 67'	Report	Zimonyi 33', 62'; Halilović (yellow card) 70'; Lesjak (yellow card) 73'; Tajti (yellow card) 74'	Stadium: Fehérvári úti Stadion; Attendance: 1,212; Referee: Péter Antal

6 February 2022 19	Ferencváros	0–3	Paks	Budapest
17:15 CET (UTC+1)	Čabraja (yellow card) 7'; Laïdouni (yellow card) 54'; Bešić (yellow card) 82'; Lončar (yellow card) 90+1'; Gavrić (yellow card) 90+3'	Report	Ádám 6', (yellow card) 38'; Lenzsér (yellow card) 24'; B. Szabó 31'; Osváth (yellow card) 58'; Haraszti 72'; Balogh (yellow card) 81'	Stadium: Groupama Arena; Attendance: 6,805; Referee: Sándor Andó-Szabó

12 February 2022 20	Paks	2–3	Gyirmót	Fehérvári úti Stadion
14:45 CET (UTC+1)	Ádám 39', 72'; Windecker (red card) 41'	Report	Varga 17' (pen.), 25'; Ventúra 82'	Stadium: Paks; Attendance: 1,398; Referee: István Vad

19 February 2022 21	Kisvárda	3–3	Paks	Kisvárda
14:45 CET (UTC+1)	Mešanović 4'; Melnyk 12'; Kravchenko (yellow card) 44'; Peteleu (yellow card) 45+4'; Asani 75'	Report	Papp 44', 45+6'; Osváth (yellow card) 45+1'; Szélpál (yellow card) 63'; Böde 71'	Stadium: Várkerti Stadion; Attendance: 2,155; Referee: József Erdős

25 February 2022 22	Paks	3–2	Fehérvár	Paks
20:00 CET (UTC+1)	Haraszti 19'; J. Szabó (yellow card) 56'; Ádám 84'; Kinyik (yellow card) 90+2'; Lenzsér 90+4'	Report	Žulj 3'; Dárdai 13', (yellow card) 71'; Pinto (yellow card) 34'; Alef (yellow card) 62'; Kodro (yellow card) 68'; D. Kovács (yellow card) 76'; Rus (yellow card) 87'; Szendrei (yellow card) 89'	Stadium: Fehérvári úti Stadion; Attendance: 1,871; Referee: Gergő Bogár

5 March 2022 23	Paks	4–0	Mezőkövesd	Paks
14:30 CET (UTC+1)	Ádám 48' (pen.), 50'; B. Szabó 68'; Gévay (yellow card) 70'; J. Szabó 84'	Report	Jurina (yellow card) 28'; Lukić (yellow card) 43'; Granečný (yellow card) 72'; Vutov (yellow card) 80'	Stadium: Fehérvári úti Stadion; Attendance: 1,378; Referee: Sándor Andó-Szabó

11 March 2022 24	Puskás Akadémia	2–0	Paks	Felcsút
20:00 CET (UTC+1)	Favorov 9', (yellow card) 79'; Szolnoki (yellow card) 39'; Nunes (yellow card) 60', (goal) 67'; Gera (yellow card) 69'; Corbu (yellow card) 82'; Spandler (yellow card) 90'	Report	Lenzsér (yellow card) 14'; Medgyes (yellow card) 16'; Böde (yellow card) 80'; Kinyik (yellow card) 82'	Stadium: Pancho Aréna; Attendance: 883; Referee: Balázs Berke

20 March 2022 25	Paks	0–1	Debrecen	Paks
13:15 CET (UTC+1)	J. Szabó (yellow card) 11'; B. Szabó (yellow card) 72'	Report	Poór (yellow card) 29'; Varga (yellow card) 40'; Da. Babunski (yellow card) 40', (goal) 52'; Do. Babunski (yellow card) 46'; Pávkovics (yellow card) 64'; Baráth (yellow card) 87'	Stadium: Fehérvári úti Stadion; Attendance: 2,076; Referee: Sándor Andó-Szabó

2 April 2022 26	Budapest Honvéd	1–1	Paks	Budapest
19:30 CEST (UTC+2)	Lovrić (yellow card) 34'; Machach 61'	Report	Lenzsér (yellow card) 28'; Medgyes (yellow card) 48'; Ádám 71' (pen.); Windecker (yellow card) 82'	Stadium: Bozsik Aréna; Attendance: 2,779; Referee: Tamás Bognár

10 April 2022 27	Paks	1–3	Újpest	Paks
14:30 CEST (UTC+2)	Ádám 24' (pen.); Szélpál (yellow card) 34'	Report	Beridze 37'; Zivzivadze 57'; Osváth 69' (o.g.)	Stadium: Fehérvári úti Stadion; Attendance: 2,507; Referee: József Erdős
Note: Kruščić (yellow card) 27'

16 April 2022 28	Paks	4–0	MTK Budapest	Paks
17:00 CEST (UTC+2)	Windecker 11', 38'; Szabó 21'; Ádám 90+2'	Report	Kovácsréti (yellow card) 24'; Rajković (yellow card) 85'	Stadium: Fehérvári úti Stadion; Attendance: 1,501; Referee: Csaba Pintér

23 April 2022 29	Zalaegerszeg	2–3	Paks	Zalaegerszeg
17:45 CEST (UTC+2)	Zsóri (yellow card) 18'; Tajti 20', (yellow card) 66'; Ubochioma 38'	Report	Ádám 4', 59', 61', (yellow card) 47'; Kinyik (yellow card) 68'; J. Szabó (yellow card) 81'	Stadium: ZTE Arena; Attendance: 2,063; Referee: Gergő Bogár

29 April 2022 30	Paks	1–2	Ferencváros	Paks
20:00 CEST (UTC+2)	Lenzsér 7'; Kovács (yellow card) 28'; Kinyik (yellow card) 37'; Kesztyűs (yellow card) 83'	Report	Bešić 20'; Laïdouni (yellow card) 39'; Vécsei (yellow card) 77'; Auzqui 90+2'	Stadium: Fehérvári úti Stadion; Attendance: 4,201; Referee: Balázs Berke

4 May 2022 31	Gyirmót	3–3	Paks	Győr
16:30 CEST (UTC+2)	Varga 70', (yellow card) 77'; Széles (yellow card) 70'; Radics (yellow card) 76'; Bezborodko (yellow card) 79'; Kovács 82'; Ventúra 90+2'	Report	J. Szabó (yellow card) 18'; Medgyes 31'; Ádám 39', 51'	Stadium: Ménfői úti Stadion; Attendance: 978; Referee: Sándor Andó-Szabó

8 May 2022 32	Paks	0–1	Kisvárda	Paks
14:05 CEST (UTC+2)	Szélpál (yellow card) 39'; Kinyik (yellow card) 47'; Gévay (yellow card) 74'	Report	Camaj 31'; Karabelyov (yellow card) 40'; Mešanović (yellow card) 90'	Stadium: Fehérvári úti Stadion; Attendance: 1,200; Referee: Csaba Pintér

14 May 2022 33	Fehérvár	2–2	Paks	Székesfehérvár
18:30 CEST (UTC+2)	Kodro 24'; Shabanov (yellow card) 49'; Osváth 67' (o.g.)	Report	Gyurkits 16'; Ádám (yellow card) 30'; J. Szabó 48'	Stadium: MOL Aréna Sóstó; Attendance: 4,224; Referee: Balázs Berke

=== Hungarian Cup ===
18 September 2021 Round of 64	Gyömrő	1–9	Paks	Gyömrő
15:00 CEST (UTC+2)	Jansik (yellow card) 28'; Gergely 84'	Report	Pethő 19', 28', 66', 85'; Windecker (yellow card) 30', (goal) 70'; R. Nagy 34'; Böde 51', 64'; Sajbán 61'	Stadium: Városi Sporttelep; Attendance: 500; Referee: Márk Szigetvári

3 November 2021 Round of 32	III. Kerület	0–5	Paks	Budapest
12:30 CET (UTC+1)	Bori (yellow card) 17'; Tamási (yellow card) 61'; Barczi (yellow card) 76'	Report	Böde 4'; Pethő 11'; J. Szabó 13', (yellow card) 65'; Bognár 19' (pen.); R. Nagy 28'; Debreceni (yellow card) 68'	Stadium: Hévízi úti Stadion; Attendance: 447; Referee: Attila Molnár

9 February 2022 Round of 16	Csákvár	0–2	Paks	Csákvár
17:00 CET (UTC+1)	Mészáros (yellow card) 26'; Derekas (yellow card) 64'; Ominger (yellow card) 82'	Report	Haraszti 25' (pen.), 70'	Stadium: Tersztyánszky Ödön Sportközpont; Attendance: 300; Referee: Marcell Derdák

1 March 2022 Quarter-finals	Kazincbarcika	0–1	Paks	Kazincbarcika
17:15 CET (UTC+1)	Heil (yellow card) 14'; Nagy (yellow card) 49'	Report	J. Szabó 73'; Papp (yellow card) 74'	Stadium: Pete András Stadion; Attendance: 900; Referee: Sándor Szilágyi

19 April 2022 Semi-finals	Paks	3–0	Újpest	Paks
20:00 CEST (UTC+2)	Diaby 28' (o.g.); Lenzsér (yellow card) 41'; Windecker 66'; Ádám (yellow card) 69'; Sajbán 86'	Report	Beridze (yellow card) 6'; Antonov (yellow card) 64'; Koutroumpis (red card) 73'	Stadium: Fehérvári úti Stadion; Attendance: 3,214; Referee: Gergő Bogár

11 May 2022 Final	Ferencváros	3–0	Paks	Budapest
19:30 CEST (UTC+2)	Zachariassen 16'; Lončar (yellow card) 68'; Botka (yellow card) 75'; Boli 83', 86'	Report	Windecker (yellow card) 60'; Lenzsér (yellow card) 65'; Ádám (yellow card) 90+2'	Stadium: Puskás Aréna; Attendance: 38,979; Referee: Tamás Bognár

=== Appearances and goals ===
Last updated on 13 March 2022.

No.	Pos	Nat	Player	Total		OTP Bank Liga		Hungarian Cup	
No.	Pos	Nat	Player	Apps	Goals	Apps	Goals	Apps	Goals
1	GK	(Hungary) HUN	Gergely Nagy	17	-30	15	-30	2	-0
2	DF	(Hungary) HUN	Ákos Kinyik	22	2	19	2	3	0
3	DF	(Hungary) HUN	Zsolt Gévay	3	0	2	0	1	0
4	DF	(Hungary) HUN	Márton Lorentz	4	0	3	0	1	0
5	DF	(Hungary) HUN	Olivér Tamás	17	0	16	0	1	0
6	DF	(Hungary) HUN	Norbert Szélpál	20	0	17	0	3	0
7	FW	(Hungary) HUN	Máté Sajbán	27	8	24	7	3	1
8	MF	(Hungary) HUN	Balázs Balogh	22	1	21	1	1	0
10	FW	(Hungary) HUN	Zsolt Haraszti	10	4	8	2	2	2
11	DF	(Hungary) HUN	Attila Osváth	12	0	11	0	1	0
12	MF	(Hungary) HUN	Gábor Vas	4	0	3	0	1	0
13	FW	(Hungary) HUN	Dániel Böde	28	6	24	3	4	3
16	FW	(Hungary) HUN	Martin Ádám	25	23	24	23	1	0
18	MF	(Hungary) HUN	Gergő Gyurkits	4	0	1	0	3	0
19	MF	(Hungary) HUN	Barna Kesztyűs	16	0	12	0	4	0
20	DF	(Hungary) HUN	Nikolasz Kovács	2	0	1	0	1	0
21	MF	(Hungary) HUN	Kristóf Papp	21	3	19	3	2	0
22	MF	(Hungary) HUN	József Windecker	22	1	19	0	3	1
23	DF	(Slovakia) SVK	Sinan Medgyes	18	0	16	0	2	0
24	DF	(Hungary) HUN	Bence Lenzsér	25	1	21	1	4	0
27	MF	(Hungary) HUN	Bálint Szabó	14	3	12	3	2	0
28	MF	(Hungary) HUN	Richárd Nagy	25	3	21	1	4	2
29	FW	(Hungary) HUN	Bence Pethő	7	5	3	0	4	5
30	DF	(Hungary) HUN	János Szabó	19	5	17	3	2	2
31	GK	(Hungary) HUN	Gergő Rácz	11	-19	9	-18	2	-1
Youth players:
17	MF	(Hungary) HUN	Bence Kocsis	1	0	0	0	1	0
20	DF	(Hungary) HUN	Milán Szekszárdi	0	0	0	0	0	0
25	GK	(Hungary) HUN	Barnabás Simon	0	0	0	-0	0	-0
Out to loan:
15	DF	(Hungary) HUN	Ákos Debreceni	2	0	0	0	2	0
Players no longer at the club:
9	FW	(Hungary) HUN	János Hahn	4	4	4	4	0	0
9	MF	(Hungary) HUN	István Bognár	19	7	18	6	1	1
17	DF	(Hungary) HUN	Dávid Kulcsár	6	0	5	0	1	0
23	FW	(Hungary) HUN	Ákos Szendrei	2	0	2	0	0	0
26	MF	(Hungary) HUN	Lajos Bertus	1	0	1	0	0	0

=== Top scorers ===
Includes all competitive matches. The list is sorted by shirt number when total goals are equal.

Last updated on 13 March 2022

Position	Nation	Number	Name	OTP Bank Liga	Hungarian Cup	Total
1	(Hungary)	16	Martin Ádám	23	0	23
2	(Hungary)	7	Máté Sajbán	7	1	8
3	(Hungary)	9	István Bognár	6	1	7
4	(Hungary)	13	Dániel Böde	3	3	6
5	(Hungary)	30	János Szabó	3	2	5
6	(Hungary)	29	Bence Pethő	0	5	5
7	(Hungary)	9	János Hahn	4	0	4
8	(Hungary)	10	Zsolt Haraszti	2	2	4
9	(Hungary)	21	Kristóf Papp	3	0	3
10	(Hungary)	27	Bálint Szabó	3	0	3
11	(Hungary)	28	Richárd Nagy	1	2	3
12	(Hungary)	2	Ákos Kinyik	2	0	2
13	(Hungary)	8	Balázs Balogh	1	0	1
14	(Hungary)	24	Bence Lenzsér	1	0	1
15	(Hungary)	22	József Windecker	0	1	1
/	/	/	Own Goals	1	0	1
			TOTALS	60	17	73

=== Disciplinary record ===
Includes all competitive matches. Players with 1 card or more included only.

Last updated on 13 March 2022

Position	Nation	Number	Name	OTP Bank Liga		Hungarian Cup		Total (Hu Total)	
Position	Nation	Number	Name	Yellow card	Red card	Yellow card	Red card	Yellow card	Red card
GK	(Hungary)	1	Gergely Nagy	1	0	0	0	1 (1)	0 (0)
DF	(Hungary)	2	Ákos Kinyik	7	0	0	0	7 (7)	0 (0)
DF	(Hungary)	3	Zsolt Gévay	1	0	0	0	1 (1)	0 (0)
DF	(Hungary)	4	Márton Lorentz	1	0	0	0	1 (1)	0 (0)
DF	(Hungary)	5	Olivér Tamás	1	0	0	0	1 (1)	0 (0)
DF	(Hungary)	6	Norbert Szélpál	7	1	0	0	7 (7)	1 (1)
MF	(Hungary)	8	Balázs Balogh	4	0	0	0	4 (4)	0 (0)
FW	(Hungary)	10	Zsolt Haraszti	1	0	0	0	1 (1)	0 (0)
DF	(Hungary)	11	Attila Osváth	2	0	0	0	2 (2)	0 (0)
FW	(Hungary)	13	Dániel Böde	4	0	0	0	4 (4)	0 (0)
DF	(Hungary)	15	Ákos Debreceni	0	0	1	0	1 (0)	0 (0)
FW	(Hungary)	16	Martin Ádám	4	0	0	0	4 (4)	0 (0)
MF	(Hungary)	19	Barna Kesztyűs	2	0	0	0	2 (2)	0 (0)
MF	(Hungary)	21	Kristóf Papp	4	0	1	0	5 (4)	0 (0)
MF	(Hungary)	22	József Windecker	1	1	1	0	2 (1)	1 (1)
DF	(Slovakia)	23	Sinan Medgyes	3	0	0	0	3 (3)	0 (0)
DF	(Hungary)	24	Bence Lenzsér	7	0	0	0	7 (7)	0 (0)
MF	(Hungary)	28	Richárd Nagy	1	0	0	0	1 (1)	0 (0)
DF	(Hungary)	30	János Szabó	1	0	1	0	2 (1)	0 (0)
			TOTALS	52	2	4	0	56 (52)	2 (2)

=== Clean sheets ===
Last updated on 13 March 2022

Position	Nation	Number	Name	OTP Bank Liga	Hungarian Cup	Total
1	(Hungary)	1	Gergely Nagy	1	2	3
2	(Hungary)	31	Gergő Rácz	1	1	2
3	(Hungary)	25	Barnabás Simon	0	0	0
4	(Hungary)	TBA	Lajos Hegedűs	0	0	0
			TOTALS	2	3	5
