= 2022–23 Paksi FC season =

Paks
2022–23 season
- Chairman: János Süli
- Manager: Róbert Waltner (until 13 February); György Bognár (from 14 February)
- Stadium: Fehérvári úti Stadion
- Nemzeti Bajnokság I: 5th
- Magyar Kupa: Quarter-finals
- Top goalscorer: League: Barnabás Varga (26); All: Barnabás Varga (29)
- Highest home attendance: 2,511 vs Fehérvár (31 July 2022); Nemzeti Bajnokság I
- Lowest home attendance: 1,197 vs Kecskemét (4 February 2023); Nemzeti Bajnokság I
- Average home league attendance: 1,811
- Biggest win: 5–0 vs Budapest Honvéd (H) (6 November 2022); Nemzeti Bajnokság I
- Biggest defeat: 0–3 vs Zalaegerszeg (A) (15 October 2022); Nemzeti Bajnokság I
Home colours	Away colours	Third colours
- All statistics correct as of 12 March 2023.

The 2022–23 season is Paksi Football Club's 17th competitive season, 17th consecutive season in the Nemzeti Bajnokság I and 70th year in existence as a football club.In addition to the domestic league, Paks participated in this season's editions of the Magyar Kupa.

== Transfers ==
=== Summer ===
In: Note: Flags indicate national team as defined under FIFA eligibility rules; some limited exceptions apply. Players may hold more than one non-FIFA nationality.

No.	Pos.	Nation	Player
4	DF	HUN	Márton Lorentz (loan return from Siófok)
14	MF	HUN	István Bognár (loan return from (Cyprus) Aris Limassol)
15	DF	HUN	Ákos Debreceni (loan return from Szeged)
88	GK	HUN	Vilmos Borsos (loan return from Diósgyőr)
—	DF	HUN	Tamás Kádár (from Újpest)
—	MF	HUN	Lukács Bőle (from Budapest Honvéd)
—	FW	HUN	Barnabás Varga (from Gyirmót)
—	DF	HUN	Zalán Debreceni (from Szombathelyi Haladás)
—	DF	HUN	Dominik Dezamits (from Szombathelyi Haladás)
—	DF	HUN	Dávid Kelemen (loan return from (Romania) Csikszereda)
—	MF	HUN	Patrik Nyári (loan return from III. Kerület)
—	MF	HUN	Dávid Bognár (loan return from Kazincbarcika)
—	FW	HUN	János Hahn (from (Slovakia) Dunajská Streda)

Out: Note: Flags indicate national team as defined under FIFA eligibility rules; some limited exceptions apply. Players may hold more than one non-FIFA nationality.

No.	Pos.	Nation	Player
14	MF	HUN	István Bognár (to MTK Budapest)
15	DF	HUN	Ákos Debreceni (loan to Siófok)
16	FW	HUN	Martin Ádám (to (South Korea) Ulsan Hyundai)
17	MF	HUN	Bence Kocsis (loan to Pécs)
19	DF	HUN	Barna Kesztyűs (loan to Pécs)
20	DF	HUN	Nikolasz Kovács (loan to Ajka)
23	DF	SVK	Sinan Medgyes (to MTK Budapest)
29	FW	HUN	Bence Pethő (to Gyirmót)
88	GK	HUN	Vilmos Borsos (loan to Dorog)
—	DF	HUN	Dávid Kelemen (to (Romania) Csikszereda)
—	MF	HUN	Dávid Bognár (to Kozármisleny)
—	MF	HUN	Patrik Nyári (loan to Siófok)
—	DF	HUN	Dominik Dezamits (loan to Mosonmagyaróvár)

=== Winter ===
In: Note: Flags indicate national team as defined under FIFA eligibility rules; some limited exceptions apply. Players may hold more than one non-FIFA nationality.

No.	Pos.	Nation	Player
20	DF	HUN	Nikolasz Kovács (loan return from Ajka)
—	MF	HUN	Attila Haris (from Soroksár)
—	LW	HUN	Alen Skribek (from Puskás Akadémia)
—	GK	HUN	József Balázs (loan from MTK Budapest)
—	MF	HUN	Patrik Nyári (loan return from Siófok)
—	DF	HUN	Dominik Dezamits (loan return from Mosonmagyaróvár)

Out: Note: Flags indicate national team as defined under FIFA eligibility rules; some limited exceptions apply. Players may hold more than one non-FIFA nationality.

No.	Pos.	Nation	Player
26	MF	HUN	Patrik Volter (loan to Siófok)
31	GK	HUN	Gergő Rácz (loan to MTK Budapest)

== Competitions ==
=== Overview ===
Competition	First match	Last match	Starting round	Final position	Record							
Competition	First match	Last match	Starting round	Final position	Pld	W	D	L	GF	GA	GD	Win %
Nemzeti Bajnokság I	31 July 2022	26 May 2023	Matchday 1	5th	33	14	7	12	57	57	+0	42.42
Magyar Kupa	18 September 2022	1 March 2023	Round of 64	Quarter-finals	4	3	0	1	11	4	+7	75.00
Total					37	17	7	13	68	61	+7	45.95

Source: Competitions

=== Nemzeti Bajnokság I ===
==== League table ====
Pos	Team	Pld	W	D	L	GF	GA	GD	Pts	Qualification or relegation
3	Debrecen	33	15	9	9	52	39	+13	54	Qualification for the Europa Conference League second qualifying round
4	Puskás Akadémia	33	14	11	8	48	42	+6	53	
5	Paks	33	14	7	12	57	57	0	49	
6	Kisvárda	33	10	13	10	43	49	−6	43	
7	Mezőkövesd	33	11	9	13	40	43	−3	42	

Source: Hungarian Football Federation (in Hungarian), Soccerway
Rules for classification: 1) Points; 2) Matches won; 3) Goal difference; 4) Goals scored; 5) Head-to-head points; 6) Head-to-head goal difference; 7) Fair play ranking; 8) Drawing of lots.

==== Results summary ====
Overall								Home						Away					
Pld	W	D	L	GF	GA	GD	Pts	W	D	L	GF	GA	GD	W	D	L	GF	GA	GD
33	14	7	12	57	57	0	49	8	2	6	24	19	+5	6	5	6	33	38	−5

Source: Soccerway

==== Results by round ====
Round	1	2	3	4	5	6	7	8	9	10	11	12	13	14	15	16	17	18	19	20	21	22	23	24	25	26	27	28	29	30	31	32	33
Ground	H	A	A	H	A	H	A	H	A	H	A	A	H	H	A	H	A	H	A	H	A	H	H	A	A	H	A	H	A	H	A	H	A
Result	W	D	D	L	W	L	L	W	W	L	L	D	L	W	L	W	D	D	L	L	W	W	W	W	W	W	L	W	W	D	L	L	D
Position	1	3	3	5	4	5	6	5	4	5	6	6	7	6	7	6	7	7	7	8	8	6	5	4	3	3	3	3	3	3	3	5	5

Source: Matches
A = Away; H = Home; W = Win; D = Draw; L = Loss

==== Matches ====
31 July 2022 1	Paks	2–0	Fehérvár	Paks
18:00 CEST (UTC+2)	Varga 41'; Windecker 51'	Report		Stadium: Fehérvári úti Stadion; Attendance: 2,511; Referee: Tamás Bognár

5 August 2022 2	Vasas	2–2	Paks	Budapest
20:00 CEST (UTC+2)	Holender 37'; Radó 45'	Report	B. Szabó 8'; Haraszti 48'	Stadium: Illovszky Rudolf Stadion; Attendance: 2,429; Referee: Ádám Pillók

14 August 2022 3	Budapest Honvéd	3–3	Paks	Budapest
20:00 CEST (UTC+2)	Lukić 14' (pen.), 20' (pen.); Kerezsi 73'; Plakuschenko (red card) 75'	Report	Varga 54', 57', 90+6' (pen.)	Stadium: Bozsik Aréna; Attendance: 2,545; Referee: Ferenc Karakó

1 February 2023 4	Paks	1–3	Ferencváros	Paks
18:30 CET (UTC+1)	Kinyik 49'	Report	Kwabena 72'; Zachariassen 83'; R. Mmaee 90' (pen.)	Stadium: Fehérvári úti Stadion; Attendance: 2,501; Referee: Bence Csonka

26 August 2022 5	Újpest	2–3	Paks	Budapest
20:00 CEST (UTC+2)	Diaby 66'; Gouré 76'	Report	Windecker 7'; B. Varga 52' (pen.); Papp 57'	Stadium: Szusza Ferenc Stadion; Attendance: 2,596; Referee: Mihály Káprály

31 August 2022 6	Paks	1–3	Kisvárda	Paks
17:00 CEST (UTC+2)	Windecker 63'	Report	Navrátil 16'; Camaj 24'; Karabelyov 52'	Stadium: Fehérvári úti Stadion; Attendance: 1,604; Referee: Péter Antal

3 September 2022 7	Kecskemét	3–1	Paks	Kecskemét
14:00 CEST (UTC+2)	B. Katona 47'; Banó-Szabó 71'; L. Szabó 88'	Report	Sajbán 81'	Stadium: Széktói Stadion; Attendance: 2,124; Referee: Bence Csonka

10 September 2022 8	Paks	1–0	Debrecen	Paks
15:30 CEST (UTC+2)	Balogh 19'	Report		Stadium: Fehérvári úti Stadion; Attendance: 1,691; Referee: Ádám Farkas

30 September 2022 9	Mezőkövesd	1–2	Paks	Mezőkövesd
20:00 CEST (UTC+2)	Dražić 1'	Report	Varga 56'; Bőle 64'	Stadium: Mezőkövesdi Városi Stadion; Attendance: 1,579; Referee: Péter Antal

9 October 2022 10	Paks	1–3	Puskás Akadémia	Paks
15:30 CEST (UTC+2)	Varga 36'	Report	Corbu 7'; Favorov 67'; Băluță 77'	Stadium: Fehérvári úti Stadion; Attendance: 1,976; Referee: József Erdős

15 October 2022 11	Zalaegerszeg	3–0	Paks	Zalaegerszeg
14:45 CEST (UTC+2)	Ikoba 6'; Mim 18'; Gergényi 86'	Report		Stadium: ZTE Arena; Attendance: 2,313; Referee: Gergő Bogár

22 October 2022 12	Fehérvár	1–1	Paks	Székesfehérvár
16:30 CEST (UTC+2)	Bamgboye 44'	Report	Szélpál 90+3'	Stadium: MOL Aréna Sóstó; Attendance: 1,979; Referee: Ferenc Karakó

29 October 2022 13	Paks	0–1	Vasas	Paks
19:30 CEST (UTC+2)		Report	Novothny 2'	Stadium: Fehérvári úti Stadion; Attendance: 1,528; Referee: Csaba Pintér

6 November 2022 14	Paks	5–0	Budapest Honvéd	Paks
18:00 CET (UTC+1)	Papp 18'; Szélpál 40'; B. Szabó 52'; Varga 55', 66'	Report		Stadium: Fehérvári úti Stadion; Attendance: 1,711; Referee: Balázs Berke

9 November 2022 15	Ferencváros	3–2	Paks	Budapest
18:15 CET (UTC+1)	Zachariassen 22'; R. Mmaee 45+1' (pen.) (red card) 90+4'; Botka 90+2'	Report	Bőle 7'; Wingo 40' (o.g.)	Stadium: Groupama Arena; Attendance: 7,129; Referee: Sándor Andó-Szabó

12 November 2022 16	Paks	3–1	Újpest	Paks
16:00 CET (UTC+1)	Papp 44'; Hahn 48'; Varga 77'	Report	Ambrose 68'	Stadium: Fehérvári úti Stadion; Attendance: 2,132; Referee: István Vad

28 January 2023 17	Kisvárda	2–2	Paks	Kisvárda
14:30 CET (UTC+1)	Mešanović 64' (pen.); Ötvös 80'	Report	Varga 25' (pen.); Skribek 90+1'	Stadium: Várkerti Stadion; Attendance: 1,745; Referee: Tamás Bognár

4 February 2023 18	Paks	0–0	Kecskemét	Paks
14:30 CET (UTC+1)		Report		Stadium: Fehérvári úti Stadion; Attendance: 1,197; Referee: Ádám Farkas

11 February 2023 19	Debrecen	2–1	Paks	Debrecen
19:30 CET (UTC+1)	Drešković 90+2'; Babunski 90+5'	Report	Varga 57'	Stadium: Nagyerdei Stadion; Attendance: 2,041; Referee: Ferenc Karakó

18 February 2023 20	Paks	0–2	Mezőkövesd	Paks
14:30 CET (UTC+1)		Report	Babunski 53'; Molnár 63'	Stadium: Fehérvári úti Stadion; Attendance: 1,511; Referee: József Erdős

25 February 2023 21	Puskás Akadémia	1–4	Paks	Felcsút
17:00 CET (UTC+1)	Spandler 8'	Report	Varga 35', 37'; Böde 84', 87'	Stadium: Pancho Aréna; Attendance: 1,120; Referee: Péter Zierkelbach

4 March 2023 22	Paks	3–1	Zalaegerszeg	Paks
17:45 CET (UTC+1)	Varga 6'; Windecker 20', 64'	Report	Grezda 32'	Stadium: Fehérvári úti Stadion; Attendance: 1,594; Referee: István Vad

11 March 2023 23	Paks	2–1	Fehérvár	Paks
17:00 CET (UTC+1)	Varga 30', 56' (pen.)	Report	Schön 45+1'	Stadium: Fehérvári úti Stadion; Attendance: 1,785; Referee: Balázs Berke

19 March 2023 24	Vasas	2–3	Paks	Budapest
13:30 CET (UTC+1)	Szivacski (yellow card) 15'; Otigba (yellow card) 22'; Holender 80'; Berecz 90'	Report	Papp (yellow card) 21'; Hahn 24'; Böde 55', 73'	Stadium: Illovszky Rudolf Stadion; Attendance: 1,595; Referee: Tamás Bognár

1 April 2023 25	Budapest Honvéd	1–2	Paks	Budapest
19:30 CEST (UTC+2)	Prenga (yellow card) 43'; Lovrić (yellow card) 45'; Lukić 49'	Report	J. Szabó (yellow card) 13'; Hahn 18'; Haraszti (yellow card) 45'; Vas (yellow card) 45+1'; Varga (yellow card) 62'; Szélpál (yellow card) 64'; Böde 85'	Stadium: Bozsik Aréna; Attendance: 3,879; Referee: Ádám Farkas

8 April 2023 26	Paks	3–2	Ferencváros	Paks
19:30 CEST (UTC+2)	Kinyik (yellow card) 19'; Varga 36', 55' (pen.); Szélpál (yellow card) 59'; Papp 70'; Balogh (yellow card) 90+1'	Report	Zachariassen 23'; Abena (yellow card) 34' (yellow-red card) 67'; Kovačević (yellow card) 54'; Botka 56', (yellow card) 83'; Lisztes (yellow card) 60'	Stadium: Fehérvári úti Stadion; Attendance: 4,280; Referee: Ferenc Karakó

16 April 2023 27	Újpest	3–2	Paks	Budapest
18:00 CEST (UTC+2)	Gouré 7'; Nikolić (yellow card) 29'; Mörschel 45+4'; Antonov 84' (pen.)	Report	Varga 32' (pen.), 52'; Szélpál (yellow card) 48'; Papp (yellow card) 84'	Stadium: Szusza Ferenc Stadion; Attendance: 3,184; Referee: István Vad

23 April 2023 28	Paks	2–0	Kisvárda	Paks
14:15 CEST (UTC+2)	Varga 43' (pen.), 77'; Osváth (yellow card) 45'	Report	Széles (yellow card) 18'; Jovičić (yellow card) 79'	Stadium: Fehérvári úti Stadion; Attendance: 2,097; Referee: Mihály Káprály

28 April 2023 29	Kecskemét	2–3	Paks	Kecskemét
20:00 CEST (UTC+2)	G. Szalai 10'; Horváth (yellow card) 39'; A. Szabó 41', (yellow card) 84'; Vágó (red card) 57'	Report	Hahn (yellow card) 32'; Varga (yellow card) 46', (goal) 51', 58' (pen.), 90'; Sajbán (yellow card) 90+4'; Böde (yellow card) 90+4'	Stadium: Széktói Stadion; Attendance: 4,950; Referee: Sándor Andó-Szabó

6 May 2023 30	Paks	0–0	Debrecen	Paks
16:30 CEST (UTC+2)	Varga (yellow card) 42'; Papp (yellow card) 83'	Report	Manrique (yellow card) 9'; Lagator (yellow card) 42'; Babunski (yellow card) 83'; Dzsudzsák (yellow card) 88'	Stadium: Fehérvári úti Stadion; Attendance: 3,065; Referee: Balázs Berke

14 May 2023 31	Mezőkövesd	6–1	Paks	Mezőkövesd
13:30 CEST (UTC+2)	Dražić 5', 38', 70'; Lukić (yellow card) 17'; Vayda 45+4'; Brtan 54'; Molnár 78'; G. Nagy (yellow card) 82'	Report	Windecker 68'	Stadium: Városi Stadion; Attendance: 1,828; Referee: Ferenc Karakó
Note: Kuttor (yellow card) 73'

19 May 2023 32	Paks	0–2	Puskás Akadémia	Paks
18:15 CEST (UTC+2)	Papp (yellow card) 15'; Kovács (yellow card) 26'	Report	Batik (yellow card) 12'; Golla (yellow card) 74'; Plšek 76'; Ormonde-Ottewill (yellow card) 86'; Corbu 90+4'	Stadium: Fehérvári úti Stadion; Attendance: 2,612; Referee: Gergő Bogár

26 May 2023 33	Zalaegerszeg	1–1	Paks	Zalaegerszeg
20:30 CEST (UTC+2)	Ubochioma 13', (yellow card) 70'; Kovács (red card) 69'	Report	Bőle 2'; Szélpál (yellow card) 33'; Hahn (yellow card) 72'; Balogh (yellow card) 75'; J. Szabó (yellow card) 89'	Stadium: ZTE Arena; Attendance: 2,672; Referee: Ádám Farkas

=== Magyar Kupa ===
18 September 2022 Round of 64	Pécs	0–1	Paks	Pécs
13:00 CEST (UTC+2)	Kesztyűs (red card) 82'	Report	Varga 63' (pen.)	Stadium: Stadion PMFC; Attendance: 1,500; Referee: Marcell Derdák

19 October 2022 Round of 32	Balatonfüred	0–3	Paks	Balatonfüred
13:30 CEST (UTC+2)		Report	Haraszti 13' (pen.); Papp 78'; Burucz 80' (o.g.)	Stadium: Városi Sporttelep; Referee: Ákos Gaál

8 February 2023 Round of 16	Monor	1–5	Paks	Monor
13:00 CET (UTC+1)	Juhász (red card) 26'; Farkas 28'	Report	Varga 17'; Szélpál 20'; Sajbán 48'; Skribek 67', 77'	Stadium: Balassi Bálint utcai Stadion; Attendance: 400; Referee: Mihály Káprály

1 March 2023 Quarter-finals	Paks	2–3	Vasas	Paks
20:00 CET (UTC+1)	Varga 19'; Böde 64'	Report	Silye 3'; Iyinbor 16'; Berecz 52' (pen.)	Stadium: Fehérvári úti Stadion; Attendance: 1,312; Referee: Péter Antal

== Statistics ==
=== Appearances and goals ===
Last updated on 12 March 2023.

No.	Pos	Nat	Player	Total		Nemzeti Bajnokság I		Magyar Kupa	
No.	Pos	Nat	Player	Apps	Goals	Apps	Goals	Apps	Goals
1	GK	(Hungary) HUN	Gergely Nagy	16	-22	14	-19	2	-3
2	DF	(Hungary) HUN	Ákos Kinyik	17	1	14	1	3	0
3	DF	(Hungary) HUN	Norbert Szélpál	17	3	13	2	4	1
5	DF	(Hungary) HUN	Olivér Tamás	4	0	3	0	1	0
6	FW	(Hungary) HUN	János Hahn	22	1	18	1	4	0
7	FW	(Hungary) HUN	Máté Sajbán	23	2	20	1	3	1
8	MF	(Hungary) HUN	Balázs Balogh	21	1	18	1	3	0
9	MF	(Hungary) HUN	Lukács Bőle	22	2	19	2	3	0
10	MF	(Hungary) HUN	Zsolt Haraszti	20	2	17	1	3	1
11	DF	(Hungary) HUN	Attila Osváth	24	0	20	0	4	0
12	DF	(Hungary) HUN	Gábor Vas	14	0	12	0	2	0
13	FW	(Hungary) HUN	Dániel Böde	7	3	6	2	1	1
14	DF	(Hungary) HUN	Tamás Kádár	25	0	23	0	2	0
17	FW	(Hungary) HUN	Alen Skribek	7	3	5	1	2	2
18	MF	(Hungary) HUN	Gergő Gyurkits	13	0	10	0	3	0
20	DF	(Hungary) HUN	Nikolasz Kovács	5	0	3	0	2	0
21	MF	(Hungary) HUN	Kristóf Papp	27	4	23	3	4	1
22	MF	(Hungary) HUN	József Windecker	21	5	18	5	3	0
23	FW	(Hungary) HUN	Barnabás Varga	25	20	22	17	3	3
24	DF	(Hungary) HUN	Bence Lenzsér	9	0	8	0	1	0
25	GK	(Hungary) HUN	Barnabás Simon	7	-7	6	-6	1	-1
27	MF	(Hungary) HUN	Bálint Szabó	19	2	17	2	2	0
27	MF	(Hungary) HUN	Attila Haris	3	0	2	0	1	0
30	DF	(Hungary) HUN	János Szabó	17	0	16	0	1	0
32	DF	(Hungary) HUN	Milán Szekszárdi	2	0	1	0	1	0
55	DF	(Hungary) HUN	Zalán Debreceni	7	0	6	0	1	0
77	DF	(Hungary) HUN	Zsolt Gévay	0	0	0	0	0	0
88	MF	(Hungary) HUN	Richárd Nagy	6	0	6	0	0	0
Youth players:
16	FW	(Hungary) HUN	Zoltán Pesti	1	0	1	0	0	0
26	MF	(Hungary) HUN	Patrik Nyári	0	0	0	0	0	0
28	FW	(Hungary) HUN	Kevin Horváth	0	0	0	0	0	0
Out to loan:
17	MF	(Hungary) HUN	Bence Kocsis	0	0	0	0	0	0
26	MF	(Hungary) HUN	Patrik Volter	3	0	2	0	1	0
31	GK	(Hungary) HUN	Gergő Rácz	7	-13	6	-13	1	-0
Players no longer at the club:

=== Top scorers ===
Includes all competitive matches. The list is sorted by shirt number when total goals are equal.

Position	Nation	Number	Name	Nemzeti Bajnokság I	Magyar Kupa	Total
1	(Hungary)	23	Barnabás Varga	26	3	29
2	(Hungary)	13	Dániel Böde	5	1	6
2	(Hungary)	22	József Windecker	6	0	6
4	(Hungary)	21	Kristóf Papp	4	1	5
5	(Hungary)	6	János Hahn	3	0	3
5	(Hungary)	9	Lukács Bőle	3	0	3
5	(Hungary)	17	Alen Skribek	1	2	3
5	(Hungary)	42	Norbert Szélpál	2	1	3
9	(Hungary)	7	Máté Sajbán	1	1	2
9	(Hungary)	10	Zsolt Haraszti	1	1	2
9	(Hungary)	27	Bálint Szabó	2	0	2
12	(Hungary)	2	Ákos Kinyik	1	0	1
12	(Hungary)	8	Balázs Balogh	1	0	1
/	/	/	Own Goals	1	1	2
			TOTALS	57	11	68

=== Hat-tricks ===
Player	Against	Result	Date	Competition	Round
(Hungary) Barnabás Varga	Budapest Honvéd	3–3 (A)	14 August 2022	Nemzeti Bajnokság I	3

=== Disciplinary record ===
Includes all competitive matches. Players with 1 card or more included only.

Last updated on 12 March 2023

Position	Nation	Number	Name	Nemzeti Bajnokság I		Magyar Kupa		Total (Hu Total)	
Position	Nation	Number	Name	Yellow card	Red card	Yellow card	Red card	Yellow card	Red card
DF	(Hungary)	2	Ákos Kinyik	4	0	1	0	5 (4)	0 (0)
DF	(Hungary)	3	Norbert Szélpál	5	0	1	0	6 (5)	0 (0)
FW	(Hungary)	6	János Hahn	2	0	1	0	3 (2)	0 (0)
FW	(Hungary)	7	Máté Sajbán	1	0	0	0	1 (1)	0 (0)
MF	(Hungary)	8	Balázs Balogh	2	0	0	0	2 (2)	0 (0)
MF	(Hungary)	9	Lukács Bőle	3	0	0	0	3 (3)	0 (0)
MF	(Hungary)	10	Zsolt Haraszti	5	0	0	0	5 (5)	0 (0)
DF	(Hungary)	11	Attila Osváth	7	0	1	0	8 (7)	0 (0)
DF	(Hungary)	12	Gábor Vas	2	0	0	0	2 (2)	0 (0)
DF	(Hungary)	14	Tamás Kádár	4	0	0	0	4 (4)	0 (0)
MF	(Hungary)	18	Gergő Gyurkits	2	0	1	0	3 (2)	0 (0)
DF	(Hungary)	20	Nikolasz Kovács	1	0	0	0	1 (1)	0 (0)
MF	(Hungary)	21	Kristóf Papp	3	0	0	0	3 (3)	0 (0)
MF	(Hungary)	22	József Windecker	2	0	0	0	2 (2)	0 (0)
FW	(Hungary)	23	Barnabás Varga	6	0	0	0	6 (6)	0 (0)
DF	(Hungary)	24	Bence Lenzsér	3	0	0	0	3 (3)	0 (0)
MF	(Hungary)	26	Patrik Volter	1	0	0	0	1 (1)	0 (0)
MF	(Hungary)	27	Bálint Szabó	4	0	0	0	4 (4)	0 (0)
DF	(Hungary)	30	János Szabó	2	0	1	0	3 (2)	0 (0)
GK	(Hungary)	31	Gergő Rácz	1	0	0	0	1 (1)	0 (0)
DF	(Hungary)	55	Zalán Debreceni	1	0	0	0	1 (1)	0 (0)
DF	(Hungary)	77	Zsolt Gévay	1	0	0	0	1 (1)	0 (0)
MF	(Hungary)	88	Richárd Nagy	2	0	0	0	2 (2)	0 (0)
			TOTALS	64	0	6	0	70 (64)	0 (0)

=== Clean sheets ===
Last updated on 9 April 2023

Position	Nation	Number	Name	Nemzeti Bajnokság I	Magyar Kupa	Total
1	(Hungary)	1	Gergely Nagy	4	1	5
2	(Hungary)	31	Gergő Rácz	1	1	2
3	(Hungary)	25	Barnabás Simon	2	0	2
			TOTALS	7	2	9
