= Gergely Nagy =

Gergely Nagy may mean:

- Gergely Nagy (footballer), Hungarian goalkeeper born in 1994
- Gergely Nagy (scholar), Hungarian medievalist and Tolkien scholar
