= Máté Sajbán =

Hungarian footballer (born 1995)

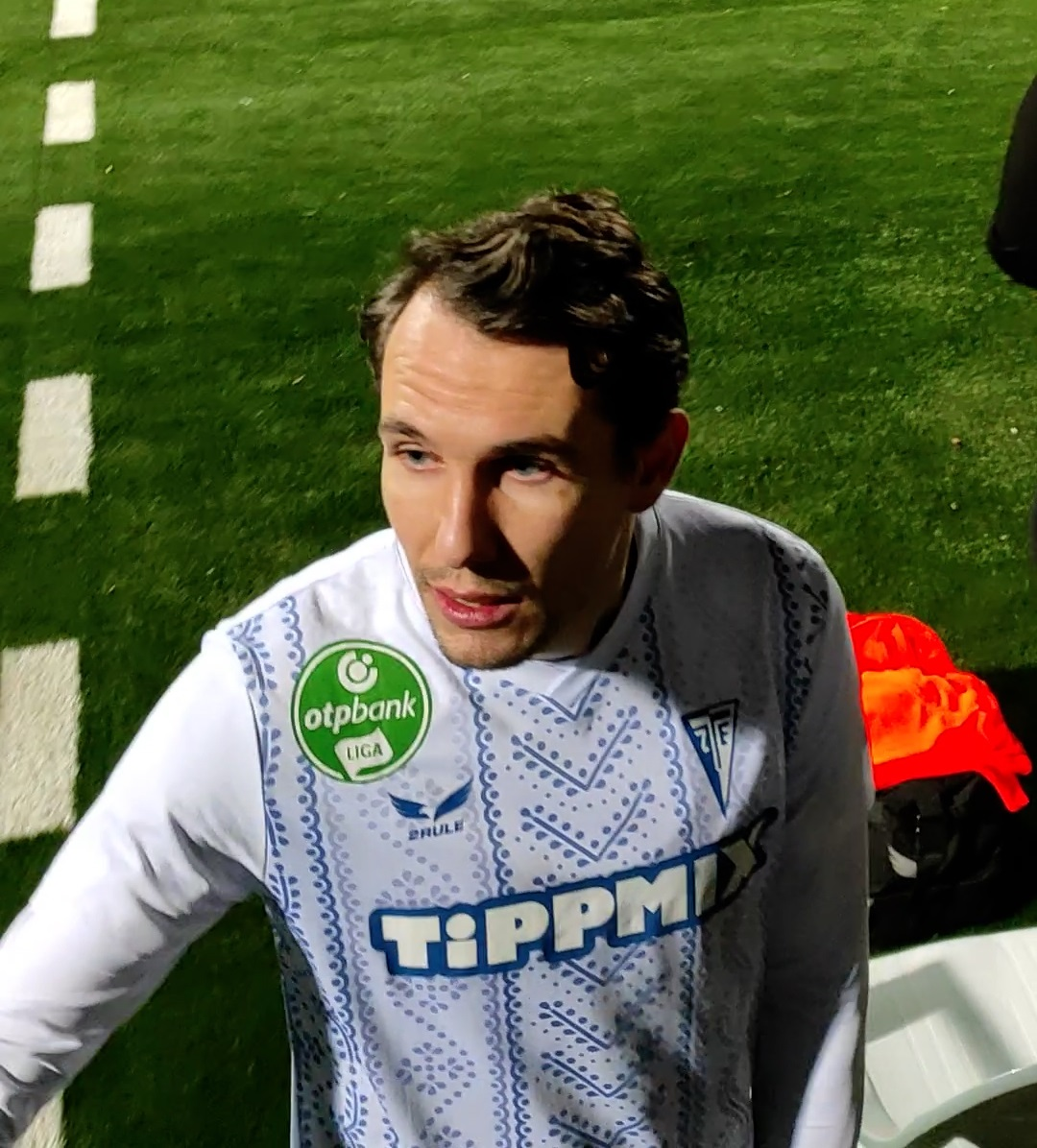
- Sajbán with Zalaegerszeg in 2025

Personal information
- Full name: Máté Mihály Sajbán
- Date of birth: 19 December 1995 (age 30)
- Place of birth: Budapest, Hungary
- Height: 1.75 m (5 ft 9 in)
- Position: Forward

Team information
- Current team: Diósgyőr
- Number: 9

Youth career
- 2007–2010: Honvéd
- 2010–2012: Budaörs

Senior career*
Years	Team	Apps	(Gls)
2012–2019	Budaörs	188	(63)
2019–2020	Mezőkövesd	7	(1)
2019	Mezőkövesd II	3	(2)
2020	→ Paks (loan)	13	(4)
2020–2023	Paks	94	(11)
2020–2021	Paks II	5	(3)
2023–2025	Zalaegerszeg	57	(8)
2025–	Diósgyőr	27	(1)
- * Club domestic league appearances and goals as of 30 May 2026

Máté Mihály Sajbán (born 19 December 1995) is a Hungarian professional footballer who plays as a forward for Nemzeti Bajnokság I club Diósgyőr.

== Career ==
On 23 June 2025, Sajbán signed a contract with Nemzeti Bajnokság I side Diósgyőr.

== Career statistics ==
As of match played 19 January 2026

Appearances and goals by club, season and competition
Club	Season	League			Magyar Kupa		Europe		Other		Total	
Club	Season	Division	Apps	Goals	Apps	Goals	Apps	Goals	Apps	Goals	Apps	Goals
Budaörs	2012–13	Nemzeti Bajnokság III	8	1	—		—		4 (Note: Three appearances in Magyar Kupa qualifying rounds, one appearance in Nemzeti Bajnokság III promotion play-offs)	0	12	1
Budaörs	2013–14	Nemzeti Bajnokság III	23	11	—		—		—		23	11
Budaörs	2014–15	Nemzeti Bajnokság III	28	12	1	0	—		—		29	12
Budaörs	2015–16	Nemzeti Bajnokság II	18	1	2	0	—		—		20	1
Budaörs	2016–17	Nemzeti Bajnokság II	36	7	—		—		—		36	7
Budaörs	2017–18	Nemzeti Bajnokság II	37	14	2	2	—		—		39	16
Budaörs	2018–19	Nemzeti Bajnokság II	38	17	6	3	—		—		44	20
Budaörs	Total		188	63	11	5	—		4	0	203	68
Mezőkövesd	2019–20	Nemzeti Bajnokság I	7	1	3	3	—		—		10	4
Mezőkövesd II	2019–20	Megyei Bajnokság I	3	2	—		—		—		3	2
Paks (loan)	2019–20	Nemzeti Bajnokság I	13	4	4	1	—		—		17	5
Paks	2020–21	Nemzeti Bajnokság I	31	3	3	1	—		—		34	4
Paks	2021–22	Nemzeti Bajnokság I	33	7	5	2	—		—		38	9
Paks	2022–23	Nemzeti Bajnokság I	30	1	3	1	—		—		33	2
Paks	Paks Total		107	15	15	5	—		—		122	20
Paks II	2020–21	Nemzeti Bajnokság III	5	3	—		—		—		5	3
Zalaegerszeg	2023–24	Nemzeti Bajnokság I	30	6	3	2	2 (Note: Appearances in UEFA Europa Conference League)	0	—		35	8
Zalaegerszeg	2024–25	Nemzeti Bajnokság I	27	2	3	1	—		—		30	3
Zalaegerszeg	Total		57	8	6	3	2	0	—		65	11
Diósgyőr	2025–26	Nemzeti Bajnokság I	16	0	1	2	—		—		17	2
Career total			383	92	36	18	2	0	4	0	425	110

== Honours ==
Budaörs

- Nemzeti Bajnokság III – Duna: 2012–13
- Nemzeti Bajnokság III – West: 2014–15

Mezőkövesd

- Magyar Kupa runner-up: 2019–20
