= Attila Osváth =

Hungarian footballer (born 1995)

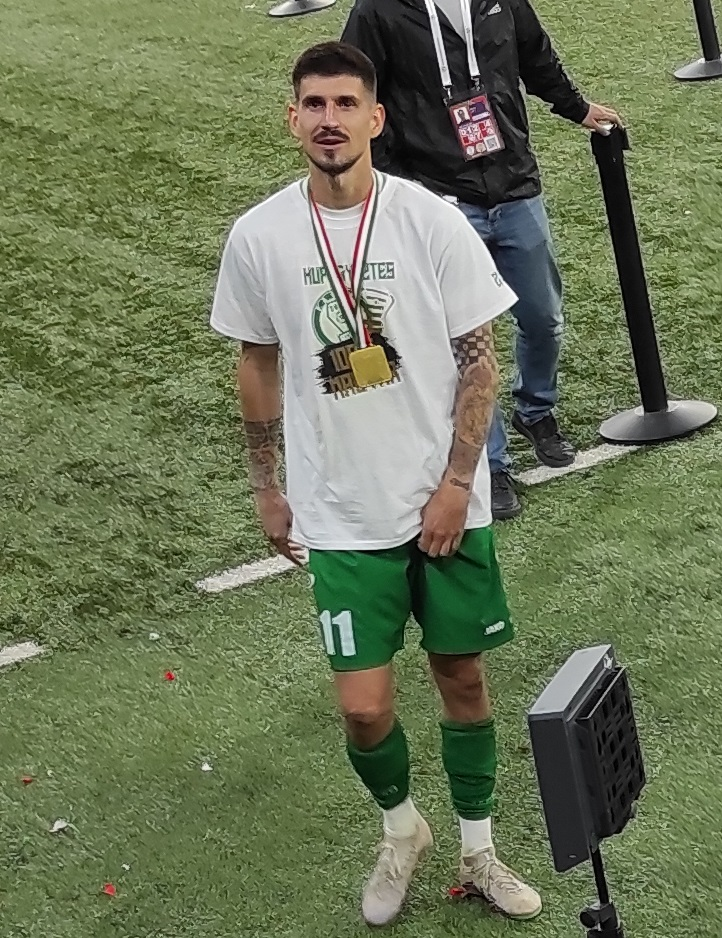
- Osváth with Paks in 2024 winning the Magyar Kupa

Personal information
- Date of birth: 10 December 1995 (age 30)
- Place of birth: Veszprém, Hungary
- Height: 1.77 m (5 ft 9 1/2 in)
- Position: Right-back

Team information
- Current team: Ferencváros
- Number: 14

Youth career
- 2005–2007: Balatonfüred
- 2006–2012: Veszprém

Senior career*
Years	Team	Apps	(Gls)
2011–2013	Veszprém	27	(3)
2013–2014	Balatonfüred	27	(5)
2014–2015	Szigetszentmiklós	21	(0)
2015–2017	Vasas	14	(1)
2017	→ Debrecen (loan)	14	(1)
2017–2019	Puskás Akadémia	28	(0)
2019–2026	Paks	170	(7)
2026–	Ferencváros	12	(0)

International career^{‡}
2014–2015	Hungary U20	9	(1)
2015–2016	Hungary U21	6	(0)
2025–	Hungary	12	(0)
- * Club domestic league appearances and goals as of 30 May 2026 ‡ National team caps and goals as of 18 November 2026

Attila Osváth (born 10 December 1995) is a Hungarian professional footballer, who plays as a right-back for Nemzeti Bajnokság I club Ferencváros and the Hungary national team. He was also part of the Hungarian U-20 team at the 2015 FIFA U-20 World Cup. On 1 October 2015, he earned his first call-up to the senior team for a qualification match against Faroe Islands and Greece on 8 and 11 October 2015.

== Career ==
=== Paks ===
On 15 May 2024, he won the 2024 Magyar Kupa Final with Paks by beating Ferencváros 2–0 at the Puskás Aréna.

On 14 May 2025, he won the 2025 Magyar Kupa final with the club after beating Ferencváros 4–3 on penalty shoot-out.

=== Ferencváros ===
On 5 February 2026, Osváth signed for Nemzeti Bajnokság I club Ferencváros. On 9 May 2026, he won the 2025–26 Magyar Kupa season with Ferencváros by beating Zalaegerszegi TE 1–0 in the 2026 Magyar Kupa final at Puskás Aréna.

== Career statistics ==
=== Club ===
As of match played 16 May 2026

Club	Season	League			Cup		League cup		Other		Total	
Club	Season	Division	Apps	Goals	Apps	Goals	Apps	Goals	Apps	Goals	Apps	Goals
Veszprém	2011–12	Nemzeti Bajnokság II	6	1	0	0	–		–		6	1
Veszprém	2012–13	Nemzeti Bajnokság II	21	2	1	0	–		–		22	2
Veszprém	Total		27	3	1	0	0	0	0	0	28	3
Balatonfüred	2013–14	Nemzeti Bajnokság III	27	5	1	1	–		–		28	6
Szigetszentmiklós	2013–14	Nemzeti Bajnokság II	21	0	2	0	5	0	–		28	0
Vasas	2015–16	Nemzeti Bajnokság I	11	1	1	0	–		–		12	1
Vasas	2016–17	Nemzeti Bajnokság I	3	0	2	0	–		–		5	0
Vasas	Total		14	1	3	0	0	0	0	0	17	1
Debrecen	2016–17	Nemzeti Bajnokság I	14	1	0	0	–		–		14	1
Puskás Akadémia	2017–18	Nemzeti Bajnokság I	14	0	4	0	–		–		18	0
Puskás Akadémia	2018–19	Nemzeti Bajnokság I	14	0	5	1	–		–		19	1
Puskás Akadémia	Total		28	0	9	1	0	0	0	0	37	1
Paks	2019–20	Nemzeti Bajnokság I	28	0	6	0	–		–		34	0
Paks	2020–21	Nemzeti Bajnokság I	25	0	1	0	–		–		26	0
Paks	2021–22	Nemzeti Bajnokság I	17	0	2	0	–		–		19	0
Paks	2022–23	Nemzeti Bajnokság I	28	0	2	0	–		–		30	0
Paks	2023–24	Nemzeti Bajnokság I	26	1	3	0	–		–		29	1
Paks	2024–25	Nemzeti Bajnokság I	28	4	3	1	–		8 (Note: Two appearances in UEFA Europa League, six appearances in UEFA Conference League)	0	39	5
Paks	2025–26	Nemzeti Bajnokság I	18	2	0	0	–		2 (Note: Appearances in UEFA Conference League)	0	20	2
Paks	Total		170	7	17	1	—		10	0	200	8
Ferencváros	2025–26	Nemzeti Bajnokság I	12	0	–		–		–		12	0
Career total			313	17	33	3	5	0	10	0	361	20

=== International ===
As of match played on 18 November 2026

Appearances and goals by national team and year
National team	Year	Apps	Goals
Hungary	2025	3	0
Hungary	2026	9	0
Total		12	0

== Honours ==
Paks

- Magyar Kupa: 2023–24, 2024–25

== External sources ==
- Profile at HLSZ (in Hungarian)
- Attila Osváth at Magyar Labdarúgó Szövetség (MLSZ) (in Hungarian)
- Attila Osváth at Soccerway
