= Bálint Szabó =

Hungarian footballer (born 2001)

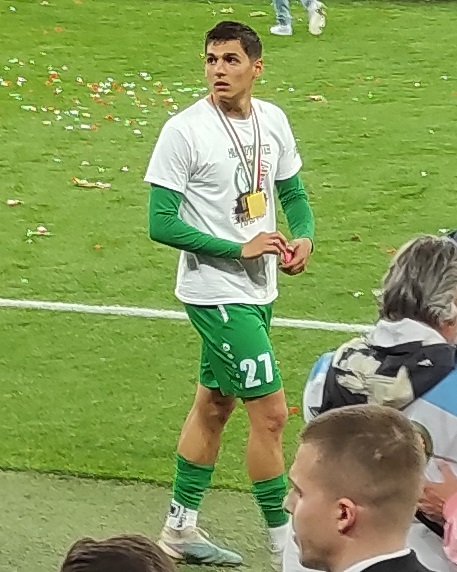
- Szabó with Paks in 2024 winning the Magyar Kupa

Personal information
- Date of birth: 18 January 2001 (age 25)
- Place of birth: Székesfehérvár, Hungary
- Height: 1.79 m (5 ft 10 in)
- Position: Midfielder

Team information
- Current team: Kecskemét
- Number: 10

Youth career
- 2008–2019: Videoton

Senior career*
Years	Team	Apps	(Gls)
2017–2020	Fehérvár II	40	(3)
2018–2020	Fehérvár	1	(0)
2019–2020	→ Budaörs (loan)	22	(1)
2020–2025	Paks	70	(9)
2020–2024	Paks II	16	(4)
2020	→ Kaposvár (loan)	14	(1)
2023	→ Antalyaspor (loan)	1	(0)
2024–2025	→ Fehérvár (loan)	23	(5)
2025–2026	FK Csíkszereda	15	(0)
2026–	Kecskemét	14	(3)

International career
2017	Hungary U16	1	(0)
2017–2018	Hungary U17	5	(0)
2019	Hungary U18	1	(0)
2019	Hungary U19	6	(0)
2022–2023	Hungary U21	6	(0)
- * Club domestic league appearances and goals as of 31 May 2026

Bálint Szabó (born 18 January 2001) is a Hungarian professional footballer who plays as a midfielder for Kecskemét.

== Club career ==
On 16 February 2023, Szabó joined Antalyaspor in Turkey on loan until the end of the season, with an option to buy.

=== Paks ===
On 15 May 2024, he won the 2024 Magyar Kupa Final with Paks by beating Ferencváros 2–0 at the Puskás Aréna.

== Career statistics ==
As of 6 December 2025

Appearances and goals by club, season and competition
Club	Season	League			National cup (Note: Includes Magyar Kupa)		Continental		Other		Total	
Club	Season	Division	Apps	Goals	Apps	Goals	Apps	Goals	Apps	Goals	Apps	Goals
Fehérvár II	2017–18	Nemzeti Bajnokság III	14	0	—		—		—		14	0
Fehérvár II	2018–19	Nemzeti Bajnokság III	24	3	—		—		—		24	3
Fehérvár II	2019–20	Nemzeti Bajnokság III	2	0	—		—		—		2	0
Fehérvár II	Total		40	3	—		—		—		40	3
Videoton	2017–18	Nemzeti Bajnokság I	1	0	—		—		—		1	0
Videoton	2018–19	Nemzeti Bajnokság I	0	0	0	0	0	0	—		0	0
Videoton	Total		1	0	0	0	0	0	—		1	0
Budaörs (loan)	2019–20	Nemzeti Bajnokság II	22	1	0	0	—		—		22	1
Paks	2020–21	Nemzeti Bajnokság I	6	0	2	0	—		—		8	0
Paks	2021–22	Nemzeti Bajnokság I	20	4	4	0	—		—		24	4
Paks	2022–23	Nemzeti Bajnokság I	17	2	2	0	—		—		19	2
Paks	2023–24	Nemzeti Bajnokság I	23	3	4	0	—		—		27	3
Paks	2024–25	Nemzeti Bajnokság I	4	0	—		4 (Note: One appearance in UEFA Europa League, three appearances and one goal in UEFA Conference League)	1	—		8	1
Paks	Total		70	9	12	0	4	1	—		86	10
Paks II	2020–21	Nemzeti Bajnokság III	8	1	—		—		—		8	1
Paks II	2021–22	Nemzeti Bajnokság III	5	1	—		—		—		5	1
Paks II	2022–23	Nemzeti Bajnokság III	0	0	—		—		—		0	0
Paks II	2023–24	Nemzeti Bajnokság III	3	2	—		—		—		3	2
Paks II	Total		16	2	—		—		—		16	2
Kaposvár (loan)	2020–21	Nemzeti Bajnokság II	14	1	2	1	—		—		16	2
Antalyaspor (loan)	2022–23	Süper Lig	1	0	—		—		—		1	0
Fehérvár (loan)	2024–25	Nemzeti Bajnokság I	23	5	2	0	—		—		25	5
FK Csíkszereda	2025–26	Liga I	15	0	2	0	—		—		17	0
Career total			202	21	18	1	4	1	0	0	224	23

== Honours ==
Videoton

- Nemzeti Bajnokság I: 2017–18
- Magyar Kupa: 2018–19

Paks

- Magyar Kupa: 2023–24
