= Barnabás Simon =

Hungarian footballer (born 2004)

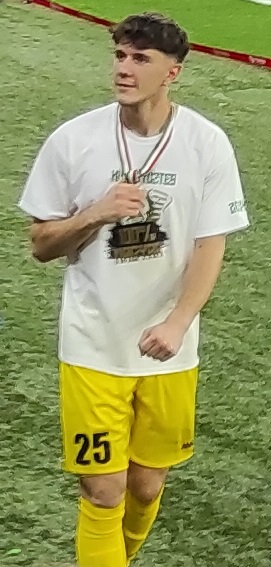
- Simon with Paks in 2024 winning the Magyar Kupa

Personal information
- Date of birth: 13 February 2004 (age 22)
- Place of birth: Szombathely, Hungary
- Height: 1.92 m (6 ft 4 in)
- Position: Goalkeeper

Team information
- Current team: Paks
- Number: 25

Youth career
- 2010–2011: Lurkó
- 2011–2016: Haladás
- 2016–2021: Illés Akadémia
- 2021–2022: Paks

Senior career*
Years	Team	Apps	(Gls)
2020–2021	Haladás	0	(0)
2021–	Paks II	63	(0)
2021–	Paks	24	(0)
2025	→ Diósgyőr (loan)	5	(0)

International career^{‡}
2021–2022	Hungary U18	3	(0)
2024	Hungary U20	1	(0)
- * Club domestic league appearances and goals as of 7 February 2026 ‡ National team caps and goals as of 20 March 2024

Barnabás Simon (born 13 February 2004) is a Hungarian professional footballer who plays as a goalkeeper for Nemzeti Bajnokság I club Paks.

== Club career ==
=== Paks ===
On 3 July 2021, Simon was officially announced as a new signing for Hungarian Nemzeti Bajnokság I club Paks, joining the club on a three-year contract.

=== Diósgyőr ===
On 4 February 2025, Simon joined Nemzeti Bajnokság I club Diósgyőr on loan until the end of the season.

== Career statistics ==
=== Club ===
As of match played 7 February 2026

Appearances and goals by club, season and competition
Club	Season	League			Magyar Kupa		Europe		Total	
Club	Season	Division	Apps	Goals	Apps	Goals	Apps	Goals	Apps	Goals
Haladás	2020–21	Nemzeti Bajnokság II	0	0	1	0	—		1	0
Paks II	2021–22	Nemzeti Bajnokság III	26	0	—		—		26	0
Paks II	2022–23	Nemzeti Bajnokság III	18	0	—		—		18	0
Paks II	2023–24	Nemzeti Bajnokság III	12	0	—		—		12	0
Paks II	2024–25	Nemzeti Bajnokság III	2	0	—		—		2	0
Paks II	2025–26	Nemzeti Bajnokság III	5	0	—		—		5	0
Paks II	Total		63	0	—		—		63	0
Paks	2021–22	Nemzeti Bajnokság I	0	0	—		—		0	0
Paks	2022–23	Nemzeti Bajnokság I	7	0	1	0	—		8	0
Paks	2023–24	Nemzeti Bajnokság I	7	0	3	0	—		10	0
Paks	2024–25	Nemzeti Bajnokság I	8	0	2	0	2 (Note: Appearances in UEFA Conference League)	0	12	0
Paks	2025–26	Nemzeti Bajnokság I	2	0	1	0	0	0	3	0
Paks	Total		24	0	7	0	2	0	33	0
Diósgyőr (loan)	2024–25	Nemzeti Bajnokság I	5	0	—		—		5	0
Career total			92	0	8	0	2	0	102	0

=== International ===
As of match played 20 March 2024

Appearances and goals by national team and year
Team	Year	Total	
Team	Year	Apps	Goals
Hungary U18	2021	1	0
Hungary U18	2022	2	0
Hungary U18	Total	3	0
Hungary U20	2024	1	0
Career total		4	0

== Honours ==
Paks

- Magyar Kupa: 2023–24; 2024–25
