= Barnabás Varga =

Hungarian footballer (born 1994)

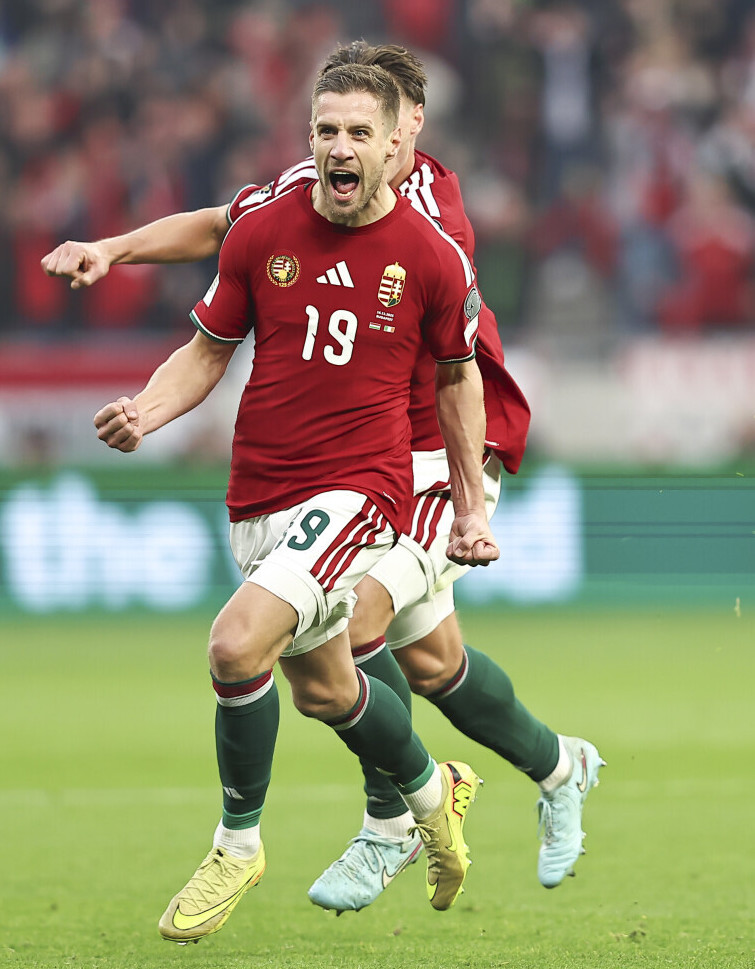
- Varga celebrating a goal for Hungary in 2025

Personal information
- Date of birth: 25 October 1994 (age 32)
- Place of birth: Szombathely, Hungary
- Height: 1.85 m (6 ft 1 in)
- Position: Striker

Team information
- Current team: AEK Athens
- Number: 19

Youth career
- 2009–2010: Illés Akadémia

Senior career*
Years	Team	Apps	(Gls)
2010–2016	SV Eberau	57	(35)
2016–2019	SV Mattersburg II	57	(51)
2016–2019	SV Mattersburg	16	(1)
2019–2020	SV Lafnitz	29	(11)
2020–2022	Gyirmót	58	(26)
2022–2023	Paks	31	(26)
2023–2026	Ferencváros	70	(42)
2026–	AEK Athens	21	(9)

International career^{‡}
2023–	Hungary	32	(17)
- * Club domestic league appearances and goals as of 13 September 2026 ‡ National team caps and goals as of 18 November 2026

Barnabás Varga (born 25 October 1994) is a Hungarian professional footballer who plays as a striker for Greek Super League club AEK Athens and the Hungary national team.

== Club career ==
=== Paks ===
With 26 goals for Paks, Varga was the top scorer of the 2022–23 Nemzeti Bajnokság I season.

=== Ferencváros ===
==== 2023–24 season ====
On 1 June 2023, Varga moved to then defending champions, Ferencváros.

On 27 July 2023, Varga scored his first European goal against Shamrock Rovers in the 2023–24 UEFA Europa Conference League.

On 6 August 2023, Varga scored his first goal in the 2023–24 Nemzeti Bajnokság I season against Fehérvár FC at the Sóstói Stadion. On 27 August, he scored a hat-trick in a 6–1 victory over former club Paks in the fifth game day of the league season. He followed this up with another hat-trick in the club's next league match, a 6–2 win over Zalaegerszeg on 3 September.

On 22 October 2023, Varga was injured in a Nemzeti Bajnokság I match against Diósgyőri VTK. Ferencváros manager, Dejan Stanković, said that Varga paid for his matches in the national team. Therefore, he had to miss the UEFA Europa League match against K.R.C. Genk.

In an interview with M4 Sport, Gábor Kubatov, the president of Ferencváros, said that he is happy that he had been convinced to purchase the top scorer of the 2022–23 Nemzeti Bajnokság I season. However, Kubatov was hesitating during the summer of 2023 to sign or not to sign Varga.

In January 2024, Varga started training with the team after his injury.

On 6 February 2024, Varga scored four goals in a 5–1 victory over arch-rivals MTK Budapest FC. After the match, Dejan Stanković, Ferencváros manager, said that Varga is a fascinating football player. In an interview, published on Nemzeti Sport, Varga said that scoring four goals was really beneficial for his soul after his long injury.

On 20 April 2024, the Ferencváros–Kisvárda tie ended with a goalless draw at the Groupama Aréna on the 29th match day of the 2023–24 Nemzeti Bajnokság I season which meant that Ferencváros won their 35th championship.

On 15 May 2024, Ferencváros were defeated by Paks 2–0 in the 2024 Magyar Kupa Final at the Puskás Aréna.

==== 2024–25 season ====
On 3 October 2024, he scored against Tottenham Hotspur in the 2024–25 UEFA Europa League league phase match in Budapest. The match ended with a 2–1 defeat for Ferencváros.

On 7 November 2024, he scored twice in a 2024–25 UEFA Europa League league phase match against FC Dynamo Kyiv. After the match, he was included in the 4th match day of the Europa League. He scored twice again in the next round of the league phase against the Swedish Malmö FF, bringing his goal tally to five goals in the first five games of the EL season.

Varga won the 2024–25 Nemzeti Bajnokság I season with Ferencváros after beating Győr 2–1 at the ETO Park on the last match day on 24 May 2025.

==== 2025–26 season ====
On 12 August 2025, he scored two goals in a 3–0 victory over PFC Ludogorets Razgrad at the Groupama Aréna in the third round of the 2025–26 UEFA Champions League qualifying.

On 2 October 2025, he scored his first goal in the UEFA Europa League season in a 1–0 victory over KRC Genk at the Cegeka Arena, Genk, Belgium. Although he missed a penalty, he scored a goal in a 3–2 victory over Red Bull Salzburg in the same competition on 23 October.

=== AEK Athens ===
On 6 January 2026, he was signed by AEK Athens. He scored his first goal a 1–1 draw against Olympiacos in the 2025–26 Super League Greece season. He scored his first double in a 4–0 victory over Panserraikos at the Serres Municipal Stadium, in Serres, Macedonia, on 7 February 2026. On 17 September 2026, he got injured in a 8–1 victory over Panserraikos F.C. in the 2026–27 Greek Football Cup season. Varga also scored two goals.

== International career ==
On 27 March 2023, Varga made his first appearance as a substitute for the Hungary national team in an UEFA Euro qualifying match against Bulgaria. Three games later, he scored his first goal in the third qualifying group stage match against Lithuania.

On 7 September 2023, Varga scored the first Hungarian goal in a 2–1 victory against Serbia in the UEFA Euro 2024 qualifying match at the Stadion Rajko Mitic in Belgrade, Serbia.

On 14 October 2023, Varga scored the first Hungarian goal in a 2–1 victory over Serbia at the Puskás Aréna in the UEFA Euro 2024 qualifying match.

On 14 May 2024, Varga was named in Hungary's squad for UEFA Euro 2024. On 8 June 2024, he scored two goals in a friendly tie against Israel at the Nagyerdei Stadion. Prior to the Euro 2024, he was included along with Robert Andrich, Jasir Asani, Abdülkerim Bardakcı, Álex Grimaldo, and Maximilian Mittelstädt by The Guardian among the six "late bloomers" who could shine at the championship. In the team's first match of the tournament, Varga scored Hungary's only goal as they were beaten 3–1 by Switzerland in Cologne.

On 23 June 2024, during the Euro 2024 group match against Scotland, Varga was rendered unconscious and landed in a fencing response, following a free kick and clash with Scotland's goalkeeper Angus Gunn. After a 10-minute wait he was stretchered off the pitch. After the match, it was reported Varga was in a conscious and stable condition.

On 6 September 2025, he scored a goal in a 2–2 draw against Ireland in the 2026 FIFA World Cup qualification at the Aviva Stadium in Dublin, Ireland. Three days later, he scored two goals in a 3–2 defeat from Portugal at the Puskás Aréna. Despite his two goals, he also received a yellow card that meant he could not play against Armenia.

Varga had to miss the first four matches of the 2026–27 UEFA Nations League B matches due to an injury. He returned to the national team on 14 November 2026 and scored the second goal in a 2–0 away victory over Georgia.

== Personal life ==
In an article, published on Nemzeti Sport, Gábor Thury said that Varga is a player who reached his peak at the end of his career. Varga was about to give up his career in his early 20s, when he received an offer from SV Mattersburg.

Varga resides in a small village, Szentpéterfa, located close to the Austrian border. In an interview published on Nemzeti Sport, he said that when he retires he wants to spend his life there.

== Career statistics ==
=== Club ===
As of match played 6 September 2026

Appearances and goals by club, season and competition
Club	Season	League			National cup (Note: Includes Austrian Cup, Magyar Kupa, Greek Football Cup)		Europe		Other		Total	
Club	Season	Division	Apps	Goals	Apps	Goals	Apps	Goals	Apps	Goals	Apps	Goals
Lafnitz	2016–17	Austrian Bundesliga	11	1	0	0	–		–		11	1
Lafnitz	2017–18	Austrian Bundesliga	0	0	0	0	–		–		0	0
Lafnitz	2018–19	Austrian Bundesliga	5	0	0	0	–		–		5	0
Lafnitz	2018–19	Austrian Second League	14	4	0	0	–		–		14	4
Lafnitz	2019–20	Austrian Second League	15	7	1	1	–		–		16	8
Lafnitz	Total		45	12	1	1	–		–		46	13
Gyirmót	2019–20	Nemzeti Bajnokság II	5	1	0	0	–		–		5	1
Gyirmót	2020–21	Nemzeti Bajnokság II	24	12	1	3	–		–		25	15
Gyirmót	2021–22	Nemzeti Bajnokság I	29	13	1	0	–		–		30	13
Gyirmót	Total		58	26	2	3	–		–		60	29
Paks	2022–23	Nemzeti Bajnokság I	31	26	2	3	–		–		33	29
Ferencváros	2023–24	Nemzeti Bajnokság I	24	20	3	0	13 (Note: Two appearances in UEFA Champions League, eleven appearances and nine goals in UEFA Europa Conference League)	9	–		40	29
Ferencváros	2024–25	Nemzeti Bajnokság I	29	12	5	2	10 (Note: Appearances in UEFA Europa League)	7	–		44	21
Ferencváros	2025–26	Nemzeti Bajnokság I	17	10	0	0	12 (Note: Six appearances and six goals in UEFA Champions League, six appearances and four goals in UEFA Europa League)	10	–		29	20
Ferencváros	Total		70	42	8	2	35	26	–		113	70
AEK Athens	2025–26	Super League Greece	17	5	1	0	3 (Note: Appearances in UEFA Conference League)	1	–		21	6
AEK Athens	2026–27	Super League Greece	3	4	0	0	2 (Note: Appearances in UEFA Champions League)	2	1 (Note: Appearance in Greek Super Cup)	0	6	6
AEK Athens	Total		20	9	1	0	5	3	1	0	27	12
Career total			224	115	14	9	40	29	1	0	279	153

=== International ===
As of match played 17 November 2026

Appearances and goals by national team and year
National team	Year	Apps	Goals
Hungary	2023	7	4
Hungary	2024	13	3
Hungary	2025	8	6
Hungary	2026	4	4
Total		32	17

Scores and results list Hungary's goal tally first, score column indicates score after each Varga goal.

List of international goals scored by Barnabás Varga
No.	Date	Venue	Opponent	Score	Result	Competition
1	20 June 2023	Puskás Aréna, Budapest, Hungary	Lithuania	1–0	2–0	UEFA Euro 2024 qualifying
2	7 September 2023	Red Star Stadium, Belgrade, Serbia	Serbia	1–1	2–1	UEFA Euro 2024 qualifying
3	14 October 2023	Puskás Aréna, Budapest, Hungary	Serbia	1–0	2–1	UEFA Euro 2024 qualifying
4	17 October 2023	Darius and Girėnas Stadium, Kaunas, Lithuania	Lithuania	2–2	2–2	UEFA Euro 2024 qualifying
5	8 June 2024	Nagyerdei Stadion, Debrecen, Hungary	Israel	2–0	3–0	Friendly
6	8 June 2024	Nagyerdei Stadion, Debrecen, Hungary	Israel	3–0	3–0	Friendly
7	15 June 2024	RheinEnergieStadion, Cologne, Germany	Switzerland	1–2	1–3	UEFA Euro 2024
8	10 June 2025	Dalga Arena, Baku, Azerbaijan	Azerbaijan	1–0	2–1	Friendly
9	6 September 2025	Aviva Stadium, Dublin, Ireland	Republic of Ireland	1–0	2–2	2026 FIFA World Cup qualification
10	9 September 2025	Puskás Aréna, Budapest, Hungary	Portugal	1–0	2–3	2026 FIFA World Cup qualification
11	9 September 2025	Puskás Aréna, Budapest, Hungary	Portugal	2–2	2–3	2026 FIFA World Cup qualification
12	13 November 2025	Vazgen Sargsyan Republican Stadium, Yerevan, Armenia	Armenia	1–0	1–0	2026 FIFA World Cup qualification
13	16 November 2025	Puskás Aréna, Budapest, Hungary	Republic of Ireland	2–1	2–3	2026 FIFA World Cup qualification
14	5 June 2026	Puskás Aréna, Budapest, Hungary	Finland	1–0	2–1	Friendly
15	5 June 2026	Puskás Aréna, Budapest, Hungary	Finland	2–0	2–1	Friendly
16	14 November 2026	Mikheil Meskhi Stadium, Tbilisi, Georgia	Georgia	2–0	2–0	2026–27 UEFA Nations League B
17	17 November 2026	Puskás Aréna, Budapest, Hungary	Northern Ireland	1–0	1–1	2026–27 UEFA Nations League B

== Honours ==
Ferencvárosi TC

- Nemzeti Bajnokság I: 2023–24, 2024–25

AEK Athens

- Super League Greece: 2025–26

Individual

- Nemzeti Bajnokság I top goalscorer: 2022–23 2023–24
- Nemzeti Bajnokság I Player of the Month: September 2023
