= Olivér Tamás =

Hungarian footballer

Personal information
- Date of birth: 14 April 2001 (age 25)
- Place of birth: Solotvyno, Ukraine
- Height: 1.88 m (6 ft 2 in)
- Position: Centre-back

Team information
- Current team: Budapesti VSC

Youth career
- 2012–2018: Ferencváros
- 2018-2020: Fehérvár

Senior career*
Years	Team	Apps	(Gls)
2019–2021	Fehérvár	1	(0)
2019–2021	→ Fehérvár II	21	(0)
2020	→ Budaörs (loan)	9	(1)
2021	→ Paks (loan)	14	(0)
2021–2024	Paks	23	(0)
2023–2024	→ Nyíregyháza (loan)	18	(0)
2024–	Nyíregyháza	7	(1)
2025–	→ BVSC (loan)	0	(0)

International career^{‡}
2019	Hungary U19	3	(0)
2021–2022	Hungary U21	4	(0)
- * Club domestic league appearances and goals as of 18 July 2025 ‡ National team caps and goals as of 21 June 2022

Olivér Tamás (born 14 April 2001) is a Hungarian professional footballer who plays for Nyíregyháza on loan to Budapesti VSC.

== Career statistics ==
As of 15 May 2021.

Appearances and goals by club, season and competition
Club	Season	League			Cup		Continental		Other		Total	
Club	Season	Division	Apps	Goals	Apps	Goals	Apps	Goals	Apps	Goals	Apps	Goals
Fehérvár II	2018–19	Nemzeti Bajnokság III	10	0	—		—		0	0	10	0
Fehérvár II	2019–20	Nemzeti Bajnokság III	11	0	—		—		0	0	11	0
Fehérvár II	Total		21	0	0	0	0	0	0	0	21	0
Fehérvár	2019–20	Nemzeti Bajnokság I	1	0	2	0	0	0	0	0	3	0
Fehérvár	Total		1	0	2	0	0	0	0	0	3	0
Budaörs	2020–21	Nemzeti Bajnokság II	9	1	1	0	0	0	0	0	10	1
Budaörs	Total		9	1	1	0	0	0	0	0	10	1
Paks	2020–21	Nemzeti Bajnokság I	14	0	0	0	0	0	0	0	14	0
Paks	Total		14	0	0	0	0	0	0	0	14	0
Career total			45	1	3	0	0	0	0	0	48	1
