= Bence Lenzsér =

Hungarian footballer (born 1996)

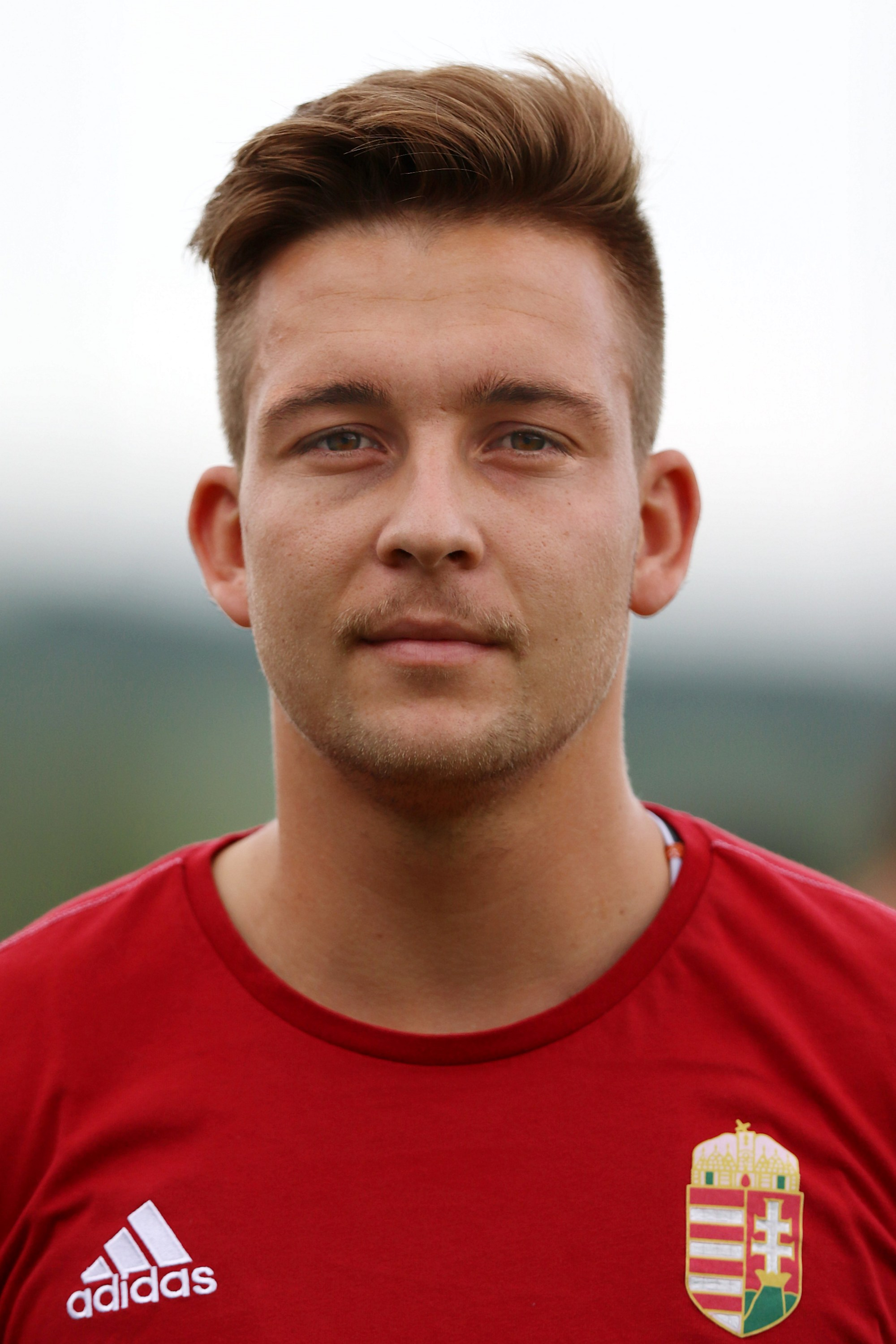

Personal information
- Date of birth: April 9, 1996 (age 30)
- Place of birth: Győr, Hungary
- Height: 1.83 m (6 ft 0 in)
- Position: Defender

Team information
- Current team: Paks
- Number: 24

Youth career
- 2003–2006: Integrál-DAC
- 2006–2015: Győr

Senior career*
Years	Team	Apps	(Gls)
2013–2015	Győr II	23	(0)
2015–	Paks	240	(11)

International career^{‡}
2014	Hungary U19	4	(0)
2015	Hungary U20	5	(1)
2015–2017	Hungary U21	9	(1)
- * Club domestic league appearances and goals as of 30 May 2026 ‡ National team caps and goals as of 5 August 2018

Bence Lenzsér (born April 9, 1996) is a Hungarian footballer. He currently plays for Paksi FC. He was also part of the Hungarian U-19 at the 2014 UEFA European Under-19 Championship and U-20 team at the 2015 FIFA U-20 World Cup.

== Career ==
=== Paks ===
On 15 May 2024, he won the 2024 Magyar Kupa Final with Paks by beating Ferencváros 2–0 at the Puskás Aréna.

== Career statistics ==
As of 15 May 2021

Appearances and goals by club, season and competition
Club	Season	League			Cup		Europe		Total	
Club	Season	Division	Apps	Goals	Apps	Goals	Apps	Goals	Apps	Goals
Győr II
Győr II	2013–14	Nemzeti Bajnokság III	17	0	—		—		17	0
Győr II	2014–15	Nemzeti Bajnokság III	6	0	—		—		6	0
Győr II	Total		23	0	0	0	0	0	23	0
Paks
Paks	2014–15	Nemzeti Bajnokság I	5	0	0	0	—		5	0
Paks	2015–16	Nemzeti Bajnokság I	27	2	0	0	—		27	2
Paks	2016–17	Nemzeti Bajnokság I	24	1	1	0	—		25	1
Paks	2017–18	Nemzeti Bajnokság I	25	2	2	0	—		27	2
Paks	2018–19	Nemzeti Bajnokság I	21	0	5	1	—		26	1
Paks	2019–20	Nemzeti Bajnokság I	21	0	4	0	—		25	0
Paks	2020–21	Nemzeti Bajnokság I	21	0	3	0	—		24	0
Paks	Total		144	5	15	1	0	0	159	6
Career total			167	5	15	1	0	0	182	6
