= Nikolasz Kovács =

Hungarian footballer

Personal information
- Date of birth: 27 February 1999 (age 27)
- Place of birth: Karcag, Hungary
- Height: 1.78 m (5 ft 10 in)
- Position: Right back

Team information
- Current team: Ajka
- Number: 14

Youth career
- 2008–2011: Ferencváros
- 2011–2014: MTK Budapest
- 2014–2018: Budapest Honvéd

Senior career*
Years	Team	Apps	(Gls)
2018–2022	Budapest Honvéd	3	(0)
2018–2022	Budapest Honvéd II	43	(2)
2019	→ Balmazújváros (loan)	17	(0)
2020–2021	→ Ajka (loan)	35	(0)
2022–2023	Paks	12	(0)
2022	→ Ajka (loan)	15	(4)
2023–2024	Budapest Honvéd	30	(1)
2024–	Ajka	57	(7)

International career
2014–2015	Hungary U-16	2	(0)
- * Club domestic league appearances and goals as of 31 May 2026

Nikolasz Kovács (born 27 February 1999) is a Hungarian football player who plays for Ajka.

== Career ==
=== Budapest Honvéd ===
On 2 June 2018, Kovács played his first match for Budapest Honvéd in a 3–1 win against Vasas in the Hungarian League.

=== Paks ===
On 12 February 2022, Kovács moved to Paks on a three-year contract.

=== Budapest Honvéd ===
On 9 July 2023, Kovács moved to Budapest Honvéd.

== Career statistics ==
Appearances and goals by club, season and competition
Club	Season	League		Cup		Europe		Total	
Club	Season	Apps	Goals	Apps	Goals	Apps	Goals	Apps	Goals
Budapest Honvéd II
Budapest Honvéd II	2017–18	17	1	0	0	–	–	17	1
Budapest Honvéd II	2018–19	13	1	0	0	–	–	13	1
Budapest Honvéd II	2019–20	9	0	0	0	–	–	9	0
Budapest Honvéd II	2021–22	4	0	0	0	–	–	4	0
Budapest Honvéd II	Total	43	2	0	0	0	0	43	2
Budapest Honvéd
Budapest Honvéd	2017–18	1	0	0	0	0	0	1	0
Budapest Honvéd	2018–19	0	0	3	0	1	0	4	0
Budapest Honvéd	2019–20	1	0	2	0	1	0	4	0
Budapest Honvéd	2021–22	1	0	1	0	–	–	2	0
Budapest Honvéd	Total	3	0	6	0	2	0	11	0
Balmazújváros
Balmazújváros	2018–19	17	0	0	0	–	–	17	0
Balmazújváros	Total	17	0	0	0	0	0	17	0
Ajka
Ajka	2019–20	13	0	0	0	–	–	13	0
Ajka	2020–21	22	0	1	0	–	–	23	0
Ajka	Total	35	0	1	0	0	0	36	0
Paks
Paks	2020–21	6	0	3	0	–	–	9	0
Paks	Total	6	0	3	0	0	0	9	0
Career total		87	2	10	0	2	0	99	2

Updated to games played as of 15 May 2022.
