= Gergő Rácz =

Hungarian footballer

Personal information
- Date of birth: 20 November 1995 (age 31)
- Place of birth: Budapest, Hungary
- Height: 1.87 m (6 ft 1 1/2 in)
- Position: Goalkeeper

Team information
- Current team: Paks

Youth career
- 2003–2009: Pestszentlőrinc
- 2009–2014: Ferencváros

Senior career*
Years	Team	Apps	(Gls)
2012–2016	Ferencváros II	48	(0)
2014–2015	→ Soroksár (loan)	0	(0)
2016–2023	Paks	63	(0)
2023	→ MTK Budapest (loan)	16	(0)
2023–2024	MTK Budapest	3	(0)
2025–2026	Budapest Honvéd	4	(0)
2026–	Paks	0	(0)
- * Club domestic league appearances and goals as of 10 June 2025

Gergő Rácz (born 20 November 1995) is a Hungarian football player who plays for Paks.

== Career ==
After a loan-deal at the club, Rácz joined MTK Budapest permanently in summer 2023.

On 30 June 2026, Rácz joined Nemzeti Bajnokság I club Paks.

== Career statistics ==
Appearances and goals by club, season and competition
Club	Season	League			Cup		League Cup		Europe		Total	
Club	Season	Division	Apps	Goals	Apps	Goals	Apps	Goals	Apps	Goals	Apps	Goals
Ferencváros II
Ferencváros II	2012–13	Nemzeti Bajnokság II	1	0	0	0	—		—		1	0
Ferencváros II	2013–14	Nemzeti Bajnokság III	21	0	0	0	—		—		21	0
Ferencváros II	2015–16	Nemzeti Bajnokság III	26	0	0	0	—		—		26	0
Ferencváros II	Total		48	0	0	0	0	0	0	0	48	0
Soroksár	2014–15	Nemzeti Bajnokság II	0	0	3	0	2	0	—		5	0
Paks	2016–17	Nemzeti Bajnokság I	0	0	0	0	—		—		0	0
Paks	2017–18	Nemzeti Bajnokság I	7	0	1	0	—		—		8	0
Paks	2018–19	Nemzeti Bajnokság I	7	0	5	0	—		—		12	0
Paks	2019–20	Nemzeti Bajnokság I	21	0	3	0	—		—		24	0
Paks	2020–21	Nemzeti Bajnokság I	9	0	1	0	—		—		10	0
Paks	Total		44	0	10	0	0	0	0	0	54	0
Career total			92	0	13	0	2	0	0	0	107	0

Updated to games played as of 15 May 2021.
