= Patrik Nyári =

Hungarian footballer

Personal information
- Date of birth: 9 April 2001 (age 25)
- Place of birth: Szombathely, Hungary
- Height: 1.85 m (6 ft 1 in)
- Position: Midfielder

Team information
- Current team: Szentlőrinci
- Number: 10

Youth career
- 2008–2010: Szentgotthárd VSE
- 2010–2012: Lurkó FC
- 2011–2012: → Haladás (loan)
- 2012–2019: Haladás

Senior career*
Years	Team	Apps	(Gls)
2019	Haladás	2	(0)
2019–2022	Fehérvár	5	(0)
2019–2020	→ Haladás (loan)	14	(0)
2020–2021	→ Budaörs (loan)	7	(2)
2022–2025	Paks	1	(0)
2022	→ III. Kerület (loan)	9	(0)
2022–2023	→ Siófok (loan)	16	(0)
2023–2024	→ Szeged (loan)	22	(0)
2024–2025	→ Szentlőrinci (loan)	15	(2)
2025–	Szentlőrinci	28	(4)

International career
2017	Hungary U-16	10	(1)
2017–2018	Hungary U-17	14	(2)
2018	Hungary U-18	9	(1)
2019	Hungary U-19	5	(3)
- * Club domestic league appearances and goals as of 31 May 2026

Patrik Nyári (born 9 April 2001) is a Hungarian professional footballer who plays for Szentlőrinci.

== Career ==
On 3 August 2019 Fehérvár FC announced, that they had signed Nyári but he would continue playing for Haladás on loan for the 2019–20 season.

== Career statistics ==
Appearances and goals by club, season and competition
Club	Season	League			Cup		Europe		Total	
Club	Season	Division	Apps	Goals	Apps	Goals	Apps	Goals	Apps	Goals
Haladás
Haladás	2018–19	Nemzeti Bajnokság I	2	0	0	0	—		2	0
Haladás	2019–20	Nemzeti Bajnokság II	14	0	1	0	—		15	0
Haladás	Total		16	0	1	0	0	0	17	0
Budaörs	2020–21	Nemzeti Bajnokság II	7	2	0	0	—		7	2
Fehérvár
Fehérvár	2019–20	Nemzeti Bajnokság I	3	0	2	0	0	0	5	0
Fehérvár	2020–21	Nemzeti Bajnokság I	2	0	0	0	0	0	2	0
Fehérvár	2021–22	Nemzeti Bajnokság I	0	0	2	0	0	0	2	0
Fehérvár	Total		5	0	4	0	0	0	9	0
Career total			28	2	5	0	0	0	33	2

Updated to games played as of 19 December 2021.
