= Barna Kesztyűs =

Hungarian footballer (born 1993)

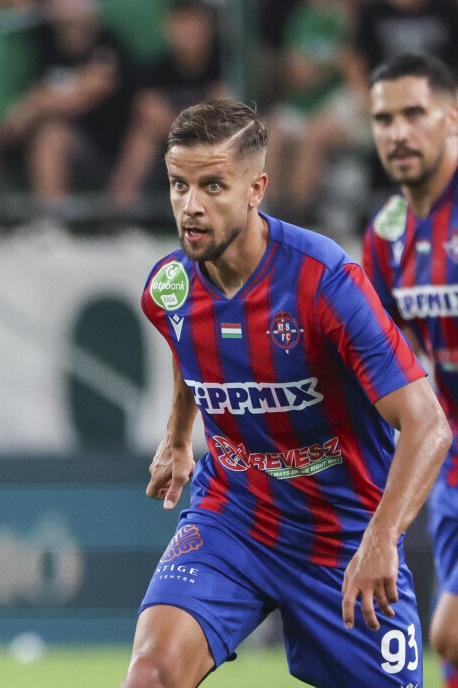
- Kesztyűs playing for Nyíregyháza in 2024

Personal information
- Date of birth: 4 September 1993 (age 33)
- Place of birth: Pécs, Hungary
- Height: 1.84 m (6 ft 1/2 in)
- Position: Midfielder

Team information
- Current team: Honvéd
- Number: 19

Youth career
- 2003–2014: Paks

Senior career*
Years	Team	Apps	(Gls)
2011–2020	Paks II	78	(15)
2014–2020	Paks	45	(0)
2017–2018	→ Nyíregyháza (loan)	29	(2)
2018–2019	→ Budaörs (loan)	21	(1)
2019–2020	→ Honvéd (loan)	29	(0)
2020–2021	Honvéd	15	(0)
2021–2023	Paks	16	(0)
2022–2023	→ Pécs (loan)	35	(2)
2023–	Nyíregyháza	35	(2)
2025–	Honvéd	11	(0)
- * Club domestic league appearances and goals as of 31 May 2026

Barna Kesztyűs (born 4 September 1993) is a Hungarian professional footballer who plays as a midfielder for Nemzeti Bajnokság II club Honvéd.

== Career ==
On 30 July 2022, Kesztyűs joined Pécs on loan.

== Career statistics ==
Appearances and goals by club, season and competition
Club	Season	League			Cup		League Cup		Europe		Total	
Club	Season	Division	Apps	Goals	Apps	Goals	Apps	Goals	Apps	Goals	Apps	Goals
Paks II	2010–11	Nemzeti Bajnokság III	1	1	2	0	—		—		3	1
Paks II	2011–12	Nemzeti Bajnokság II	2	0	0	0	—		—		2	0
Paks II	2012–13	Nemzeti Bajnokság II	21	0	0	0	—		—		21	0
Paks II	2014–15	Megyei Bajnokság I	11	7	0	0	—		—		11	7
Paks II	2015–16	Nemzeti Bajnokság III	10	1	0	0	—		—		10	1
Paks II	2016–17	Nemzeti Bajnokság III	29	5	0	0	—		—		29	5
Paks II	2018–19	Nemzeti Bajnokság III	4	1	0	0	—		—		4	1
Paks II	Total		78	15	2	0	—		—		80	15
Paks	2011–12	Nemzeti Bajnokság I	0	0	1	0	0	0	—		1	0
Paks	2014–15	Nemzeti Bajnokság I	14	0	1	0	7	1	—		22	1
Paks	2015–16	Nemzeti Bajnokság I	19	0	2	0	—		—		21	0
Paks	2016–17	Nemzeti Bajnokság I	3	0	2	0	—		—		5	0
Paks	2018–19	Nemzeti Bajnokság I	9	0	2	0	—		—		11	0
Paks	Total		45	0	8	0	7	1	—		60	1
Nyíregyháza	2017–18	Nemzeti Bajnokság II	29	2	2	0	—		—		31	2
Budaörs	2018–19	Nemzeti Bajnokság II	21	1	3	0	—		—		24	1
Honvéd	2019–20	Nemzeti Bajnokság I	29	0	8	0	—		3	0	40	0
Honvéd	2020–21	Nemzeti Bajnokság I	15	0	3	0	—		2	0	20	0
Honvéd	Total		44	0	11	0	0	0	5	0	60	0
Career total			217	18	26	0	7	1	5	0	255	19

Updated to games played as of 15 May 2021.
