= Norbert Szélpál =

Hungarian footballer

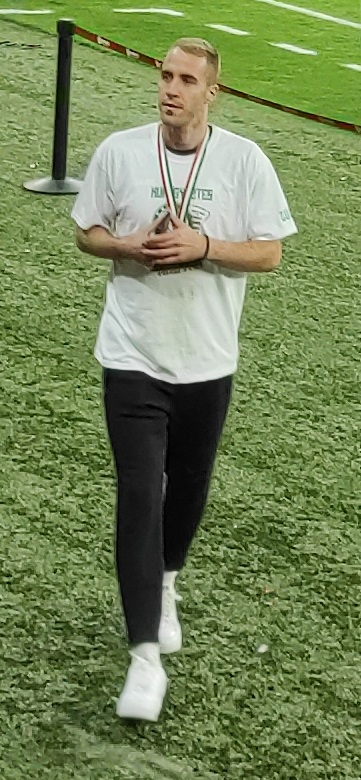
- Szélpál with Paks in 2024

Personal information
- Date of birth: 3 March 1996 (age 30)
- Place of birth: Szeged, Hungary
- Height: 1.96 m (6 ft 5 in)
- Position: Centre-back

Team information
- Current team: Paks
- Number: 3

Youth career
- 2005–2010: Tisza Volán
- 2010–2011: Vasas
- 2011–2013: Békéscsaba
- 2013–2014: Ferencváros

Senior career*
Years	Team	Apps	(Gls)
2014–2016	Diósd	32	(1)
2016–2020	Békéscsaba	108	(6)
2020–	Paks	86	(3)

International career^{‡}
2017	Hungary U-21	1	(0)
- * Club domestic league appearances and goals as of 12 August 2024 ‡ National team caps and goals as of 23 February 2020

Norbert Szélpál (born 3 March 1996) is a Hungarian football centre-back who plays for Nemzeti Bajnokság I club Paks.

== Career ==
=== Paks ===
On 15 May 2024, he won the 2024 Magyar Kupa Final with Paks by beating Ferencváros 2–0 at the Puskás Aréna.

== Career statistics ==
As of 15 May 2021.

Appearances and goals by club, season and competition
Club	Season	League			Cup		Continental		Other		Total	
Club	Season	Division	Apps	Goals	Apps	Goals	Apps	Goals	Apps	Goals	Apps	Goals
Diósd	2014–15	Nemzeti Bajnokság III	20	1	1	0	—		—		21	1
Diósd	2015–16	Nemzeti Bajnokság III	12	0	2	0	—		—		14	0
Diósd	Total		32	1	3	0	0	0	0	0	35	1
Békéscsaba	2015–16	Nemzeti Bajnokság I	1	0	0	0	—		—		1	0
Békéscsaba	2016–17	Nemzeti Bajnokság II	32	0	0	0	—		—		32	0
Békéscsaba	2017–18	Nemzeti Bajnokság II	33	3	6	1	—		—		39	4
Békéscsaba	2018–19	Nemzeti Bajnokság II	33	3	2	0	—		—		35	3
Békéscsaba	2019–20	Nemzeti Bajnokság II	9	0	1	0	—		—		10	0
Békéscsaba	Total		108	6	9	1	0	0	0	0	117	7
Paks	2019–20	Nemzeti Bajnokság I	14	0	2	0	—		—		16	0
Paks	2020–21	Nemzeti Bajnokság I	11	1	1	0	—		—		12	1
Paks	Total		25	1	3	0	0	0	0	0	28	1
Career total			165	8	15	1	0	0	0	0	180	9
