= Richárd Nagy (footballer, born 1994) =

Hungarian footballer

Personal information
- Date of birth: 8 April 1994 (age 32)
- Place of birth: Budapest, Hungary
- Height: 1.70 m (5 ft 7 in)
- Position: Attacking midfielder

Team information
- Current team: Békéscsaba
- Number: 88

Youth career
- 2003–2013: Vác

Senior career*
Years	Team	Apps	(Gls)
2013–2014	Veresegyháza	14	(2)
2014–2015	Vác	11	(1)
2015	→ Balatonfüred (loan)	14	(6)
2015–2016	Dorog	22	(2)
2016–2018	Vác	44	(4)
2018–2020	Kaposvár	54	(9)
2020–2025	Paks	60	(4)
2023–2024	→ Siófok (loan)	8	(2)
2024	→ Szeged (loan)	7	(0)
2024–2025	→ Szentlőrinc (loan)	30	(4)
2025	Szentlőrinc	13	(4)
2026–	Békéscsaba	9	(1)
- * Club domestic league appearances and goals as of 31 May 2026

Richárd Nagy (born 8 April 1994) is a Hungarian professional footballer who plays for Békéscsaba.

== Career statistics ==
As of 15 May 2021

Appearances and goals by club, season and competition
Club	Season	League			Cup		Europe		Total	
Club	Season	Division	Apps	Goals	Apps	Goals	Apps	Goals	Apps	Goals
Veresegyháza	2013–14	Nemzeti Bajnokság III	14	2	0	0	—		14	2
Balatonfüred	2014–15	Nemzeti Bajnokság III	14	6	0	0	—		14	6
Dorog	2015–16	Nemzeti Bajnokság III	22	2	3	2	—		25	4
Vác
Vác	2013–14	Megyei Bajnokság I	8	1	4	1	—		12	2
Vác	2014–15	Nemzeti Bajnokság III	3	0	1	1	—		4	1
Vác	2016–17	Nemzeti Bajnokság II	23	0	2	1	—		25	1
Vác	2017–18	Nemzeti Bajnokság II	21	4	1	1	—		22	5
Vác	Total		55	5	8	4	0	0	63	9
Kaposvár
Kaposvár	2018–19	Nemzeti Bajnokság II	25	6	2	0	—		27	6
Kaposvár	2019–20	Nemzeti Bajnokság I	29	3	4	2	—		33	5
Kaposvár	Total		54	9	6	2	0	0	60	11
Paks	2020–21	Nemzeti Bajnokság I	25	3	2	1	—		27	4
Career total			184	27	19	9	0	0	203	36
