= Márton Lorentz =

Hungarian footballer (born 1995)

Personal information
- Date of birth: 1 February 1995 (age 31)
- Place of birth: Budapest, Hungary
- Height: 1.84 m (6 ft 0 in)
- Position: Defender

Team information
- Current team: Aqvital Csákvár
- Number: 42

Youth career
- 2007–2009: MTK
- 2009–2010: Rákosmente
- 2010–2011: Felcsút
- 2011–2013: Videoton

Senior career*
Years	Team	Apps	(Gls)
2013–2018	Videoton	0	(0)
2013–2015	→ Puskás Akadémia (loan)	14	(1)
2015–2016	→ Dunaújváros PASE (loan)	23	(2)
2016–2017	→ Soroksár (loan)	24	(1)
2017–2018	→ Siófok (loan)	36	(1)
2018–2020	Siófok	59	(0)
2020–2022	Paks	21	(0)
2020–2023	Paks II	24	(0)
2022	→ Siófok (loan)	2	(0)
2023–2025	Budafok	56	(0)
2025–	Aqvital Csákvár	26	(0)

International career
2012–2013	Hungary U18	4	(0)
2013	Hungary U19	6	(1)
2014	Hungary U20	2	(0)
- * Club domestic league appearances and goals as of 31 May 2026

Márton Lorentz (born 1 February 1995) is a Hungarian professional footballer who plays for Aqvital Csákvár.

== Club career ==
On 14 February 2022, Lorentz returned to Siófok on loan until the end of the season.

== Career statistics ==
Appearances and goals by club, season and competition
Club	Season	League			Cup		League Cup		Europe		Total	
Club	Season	Division	Apps	Goals	Apps	Goals	Apps	Goals	Apps	Goals	Apps	Goals
Videoton	2012–13	Nemzeti Bajnokság II	0	0	0	0	1	0	0	0	1	0
Puskás
Puskás	2013–14	Nemzeti Bajnokság I	3	0	0	0	2	0	0	0	5	0
Puskás	2014–15	Nemzeti Bajnokság I	10	1	2	0	3	0	0	0	15	1
Puskás	2015–16	Nemzeti Bajnokság I	1	0	1	0	—		0	0	2	0
Puskás	Total		14	1	3	0	5	0	0	0	22	1
Dunaújváros	2015–16	Nemzeti Bajnokság II	23	2	0	0	—		0	0	23	2
Soroksár	2016–17	Nemzeti Bajnokság II	24	1	2	2	—		0	0	26	3
Siófok
Siófok	2017–18	Nemzeti Bajnokság II	36	1	5	2	—		0	0	41	3
Siófok	2018–19	Nemzeti Bajnokság II	33	0	3	0	—		0	0	36	0
Siófok	2019–20	Nemzeti Bajnokság II	26	0	2	0	—		0	0	28	0
Siófok	Total		95	1	10	2	0	0	0	0	105	3
Paks	2020–21	Nemzeti Bajnokság I	18	0	4	0	—		0	0	22	0
Career total			174	5	19	4	6	0	0	0	199	9

Updated to games played as of 15 May 2021.
