= Gergely Nagy (footballer) =

Hungarian footballer

Personal information
- Date of birth: 27 May 1994 (age 32)
- Place of birth: Cegléd, Hungary
- Height: 1.97 m (6 ft 5 1/2 in)
- Position: Goalkeeper

Team information
- Current team: Fehérvár FC
- Number: 1

Youth career
- 2006–2008: Abony
- 2008–2012: Győr

Senior career*
Years	Team	Apps	(Gls)
2010–2014	Győr	2	(0)
2010–2014	→ Győr II	36	(0)
2014–2015	Dunaújváros	20	(0)
2015–2018	Vasas	72	(0)
2018–2019	Paks	26	(0)
2020–2021	AEL	26	(0)
2021–2023	Paks	41	(0)
2023–2024	Lamia	1	(0)
2024	PAS Giannina	5	(0)
2024–	Fehérvár	28	(0)

International career^{‡}
2012	Hungary U-18	1	(0)
2012–2013	Hungary U-19	1	(0)
2014–2015	Hungary U-21	11	(0)
- * Club domestic league appearances and goals as of 31 May 2026 ‡ National team caps and goals as of 6 October 2016

Gergely Nagy (born 27 May 1994) is a Hungarian professional footballer who plays as a goalkeeper. He plays for Merkantil Bank Liga club Fehérvár.

== Career ==
On 13 July 2021, Nagy returned to Paks on a three-year contract.

== Career statistics ==
As of 19 May 2019

Appearances and goals by club, season and competition
Club	Season	League			Cup		League Cup		Europe		Total	
Club	Season	Division	Apps	Goals	Apps	Goals	Apps	Goals	Apps	Goals	Apps	Goals
Győr II
Győr II	2010–11	Nemzeti Bajnokság II	3	0	0	0	—		—		3	0
Győr II	2011–12	Nemzeti Bajnokság II	6	0	0	0	—		—		6	0
Győr II	2012–13	Nemzeti Bajnokság II	11	0	0	0	—		—		11	0
Győr II	2013–14	Nemzeti Bajnokság III	16	0	0	0	—		—		16	0
Győr II	Total		36	0	0	0	0	0	0	0	36	0
Győr
Győr	2011–12	Nemzeti Bajnokság I	1	0	0	0	0	0	—		1	0
Győr	2013–14	Nemzeti Bajnokság I	1	0	0	0	2	0	0	0	3	0
Győr	Total		2	0	0	0	2	0	0	0	4	0
Dunaújváros	2014–15	Nemzeti Bajnokság I	20	0	1	0	4	0	—		25	0
Vasas
Vasas	2015–16	Nemzeti Bajnokság I	23	0	0	0	—		—		23	0
Vasas	2016–17	Nemzeti Bajnokság I	29	0	5	0	—		—		34	0
Vasas	2017–18	Nemzeti Bajnokság I	12	0	1	0	—		2	0	15	0
Vasas	Total		64	0	6	0	0	0	2	0	72	0
Paks	2018–19	Nemzeti Bajnokság I	26	0	0	0	—		—		26	0
Career total			148	0	7	0	6	0	2	0	163	0
