= 2018–19 Paksi FC season =

Paks
2018–19 season
- Chairman: János Süli
- Manager: Aurél Csertői
- Nemzeti Bajnokság I: 8th
- Hungarian Cup: Round of 16
- Top goalscorer: League: János Hahn (9); All: János Hahn (11)
- Highest home attendance: 1,916 vs Ferencváros (1 December 2018)
- Lowest home attendance: 250 vs Diósgyőr (15 December 2018)
| Home colours | Away colours |

The 2018–19 season was Paksi Football Club's 13th competitive season, 13th consecutive season in the OTP Bank Liga and 66th year in existence as a football club. In addition to the domestic league, Paks participated in this season's editions of the Hungarian Cup.

== First team squad ==
Note: Flags indicate national team as defined under FIFA eligibility rules; some limited exceptions apply. Players may hold more than one non-FIFA nationality.

| No. | Pos. | Nation | Player |
|---|---|---|---|
| 1 | GK | HUN | Gergely Nagy |
| 5 | DF | HUN | Zsolt Gévay |
| 7 | DF | HUN | Tamás Báló |
| 8 | MF | HUN | Tamás Kecskés |
| 9 | FW | HUN | János Hahn |
| 10 | FW | HUN | Zsolt Haraszti |
| 12 | MF | HUN | Richárd Nagy |
| 14 | DF | HUN | András Fejes |
| 15 | FW | HUN | Péter Horváth |
| 16 | MF | HUN | Mohamed Remili |
| 17 | MF | HUN | Tamás Egerszegi |
| 18 | MF | HUN | Dominik Molnár |
| 21 | MF | HUN | Kristóf Papp |

| No. | Pos. | Nation | Player |
|---|---|---|---|
| 23 | DF | HUN | András Vági |
| 25 | DF | HUN | Máté Berdó |
| 26 | MF | HUN | Lajos Bertus |
| 27 | MF | HUN | Róbert Kővári |
| 28 | MF | HUN | Márk Nikházi |
| 30 | DF | HUN | János Szabó |
| 31 | GK | HUN | Gergő Rácz |
| 39 | FW | HUN | László Bartha |
| 46 | MF | HUN | Ádám Simon |
| 77 | DF | HUN | Dávid Kulcsár |
| 88 | GK | HUN | Vilmos Borsos |
| 90 | FW | HUN | András Simon |
| 96 | DF | HUN | Bence Lenzsér |

== Transfers ==
=== Summer ===
In: Note: Flags indicate national team as defined under FIFA eligibility rules; some limited exceptions apply. Players may hold more than one non-FIFA nationality.

| No. | Pos. | Nation | Player |
|---|---|---|---|
| 1 | GK | HUN | Gergely Nagy (from Vasas) |
| 12 | MF | HUN | Richárd Nagy (from Paks II) |
| 14 | MF | HUN | Dávid Bor (loan return from Sopron) |
| 15 | FW | HUN | Péter Horváth (from Sopron) |
| 16 | MF | HUN | Mohamed Remili (from Vasas) |
| 17 | MF | HUN | Tamás Egerszegi (from Vasas) |
| 18 | MF | HUN | Dominik Molnár (from MOL Vidi II) |
| 19 | MF | HUN | Barna Kesztyűs (loan return from Nyíregyháza) |
| 22 | MF | HUN | Áron Fejős (loan return from Szeged) |
| 25 | DF | HUN | Máté Berdó (from Paks II) |
| 27 | MF | HUN | Róbert Kővári (loan return from Sopron) |
| 32 | DF | HUN | Dávid Kelemen (from Nyíregyháza) |
| 40 | DF | HUN | András Szalai (loan return from Dorog) |
| 88 | GK | HUN | Vilmos Borsos (from MOL Vidi II) |
| 94 | FW | HUN | Bence Daru (loan return from Győr) |
| 98 | FW | HUN | Richárd Jelena (loan return from Zalaegerszeg) |

Out: Note: Flags indicate national team as defined under FIFA eligibility rules; some limited exceptions apply. Players may hold more than one non-FIFA nationality.

| No. | Pos. | Nation | Player |
|---|---|---|---|
| 1 | GK | SVK | Péter Molnár (to Siófok) |
| 11 | FW | HUN | Márk Simon (to Csákvár) |
| 14 | MF | HUN | Dávid Bor (loan to Soroksár) |
| 17 | MF | HUN | Dénes Szakály (to Mezőkövesd) |
| 19 | MF | HUN | Barna Kesztyűs (loan to Budaörs) |
| 20 | MF | HUN | Péter Zachán (loan to Dorog) |
| 22 | MF | HUN | Áron Fejős (loan to Budaörs) |
| 29 | MF | HUN | Tamás Koltai (to Győr) |
| 32 | DF | HUN | Dávid Kelemen (loan to Vasas) |
| 38 | DF | HUN | Ádám Hajdú (loan to Vasas) |
| 40 | DF | HUN | András Szalai (loan to Balmazújváros) |
| 87 | GK | HUN | István Verpecz (loan to Balmazújváros) |
| 94 | FW | HUN | Bence Daru (loan to Nyíregyháza) |
| 98 | FW | HUN | Richárd Jelena (loan to Mosonmagyaróvár) |

=== Winter ===
In: Note: Flags indicate national team as defined under FIFA eligibility rules; some limited exceptions apply. Players may hold more than one non-FIFA nationality.

| No. | Pos. | Nation | Player |
|---|---|---|---|
| 2 | DF | HUN | Dávid Bobál (from (Czech Republic) Dukla Prague) |
| 6 | MF | HUN | Benjámin Cseke (from Újpest) |
| 19 | MF | HUN | Barna Kesztyűs (loan return from Budaörs) |
| 20 | DF | HUN | Péter Zachán (loan return from Dorog) |
| 22 | MF | HUN | József Windecker (from (Greece) Levadiakos) |
| 28 | MF | HUN | László Zsidai (from Puskás Akadémia) |
| 42 | FW | HUN | Norbert Könyves (from Debrecen) |

Out: Note: Flags indicate national team as defined under FIFA eligibility rules; some limited exceptions apply. Players may hold more than one non-FIFA nationality.

| No. | Pos. | Nation | Player |
|---|---|---|---|
| 15 | FW | HUN | Péter Horváth (to Siófok) |
| 26 | MF | HUN | Lajos Bertus (to Mezőkövesd) |
| 28 | MF | HUN | Márk Nikházi (to III. Kerület) |
| 88 | GK | HUN | Vilmos Borsos (loan to Budaörs) |

== Statistics ==
=== Appearances and goals ===
Last updated on 19 May 2019.

| No. | Pos | Nat | Player | Total | | OTP Bank Liga | | Hungarian Cup | |
| No. | Pos | Nat | Player | Apps | Goals | Apps | Goals | Apps | Goals |
|---|---|---|---|---|---|---|---|---|---|
| 1 | GK | (Hungary) HUN | Gergely Nagy | 26 | -34 | 26 | -34 | 0 | 0 |
| 2 | DF | (Hungary) HUN | Dávid Bobál | 7 | 0 | 5 | 0 | 2 | 0 |
| 5 | DF | (Hungary) HUN | Zsolt Gévay | 23 | 4 | 22 | 3 | 1 | 1 |
| 6 | MF | (Hungary) HUN | Benjámin Cseke | 5 | 1 | 5 | 1 | 0 | 0 |
| 7 | DF | (Hungary) HUN | Tamás Báló | 13 | 0 | 11 | 0 | 2 | 0 |
| 8 | MF | (Hungary) HUN | Tamás Kecskés | 26 | 2 | 23 | 2 | 3 | 0 |
| 9 | FW | (Hungary) HUN | János Hahn | 35 | 11 | 31 | 9 | 4 | 2 |
| 10 | MF | (Hungary) HUN | Zsolt Haraszti | 19 | 1 | 16 | 0 | 3 | 1 |
| 12 | FW | (Hungary) HUN | Richárd Nagy | 6 | 1 | 3 | 0 | 3 | 1 |
| 14 | DF | (Hungary) HUN | András Fejes | 30 | 0 | 28 | 0 | 2 | 0 |
| 16 | MF | (Hungary) HUN | Mohamed Remili | 28 | 6 | 23 | 4 | 5 | 2 |
| 17 | MF | (Hungary) HUN | Tamás Egerszegi | 25 | 1 | 20 | 0 | 5 | 1 |
| 19 | MF | (Hungary) HUN | Barna Kesztyűs | 11 | 0 | 9 | 0 | 2 | 0 |
| 20 | DF | (Hungary) HUN | Péter Zachán | 1 | 0 | 1 | 0 | 0 | 0 |
| 21 | MF | (Hungary) HUN | Kristóf Papp | 30 | 1 | 28 | 1 | 2 | 0 |
| 22 | MF | (Hungary) HUN | József Windecker | 13 | 0 | 12 | 0 | 1 | 0 |
| 23 | DF | (Hungary) HUN | András Vági | 10 | 0 | 7 | 0 | 3 | 0 |
| 27 | MF | (Hungary) HUN | Róbert Kővári | 20 | 0 | 16 | 0 | 4 | 0 |
| 28 | MF | (Hungary) HUN | László Zsidai | 9 | 0 | 8 | 0 | 1 | 0 |
| 30 | DF | (Hungary) HUN | János Szabó | 20 | 1 | 19 | 1 | 1 | 0 |
| 31 | GK | (Hungary) HUN | Gergő Rácz | 12 | -19 | 7 | -12 | 5 | -7 |
| 39 | MF | (Hungary) HUN | László Bartha | 30 | 2 | 29 | 1 | 1 | 1 |
| 42 | FW | (Hungary) HUN | Norbert Könyves | 15 | 2 | 13 | 2 | 2 | 0 |
| 46 | MF | (Hungary) HUN | Ádám Simon | 3 | 0 | 3 | 0 | 0 | 0 |
| 77 | DF | (Hungary) HUN | Dávid Kulcsár | 21 | 1 | 19 | 1 | 2 | 0 |
| 90 | FW | (Hungary) HUN | András Simon | 34 | 5 | 29 | 5 | 5 | 0 |
| 96 | DF | (Hungary) HUN | Bence Lenzsér | 26 | 1 | 21 | 0 | 5 | 1 |
Youth players:
| 18 | MF | (Hungary) HUN | Dominik Molnár | 1 | 0 | 0 | 0 | 1 | 0 |
| 20 | FW | (Hungary) HUN | Máté Adamcsek | 1 | 0 | 0 | 0 | 1 | 0 |
| 25 | DF | (Hungary) HUN | Máté Berdó | 1 | 0 | 0 | 0 | 1 | 0 |
Players no longer at the club:
| 15 | FW | (Hungary) HUN | Péter Horváth | 7 | 0 | 6 | 0 | 1 | 0 |
| 26 | MF | (Hungary) HUN | Lajos Bertus | 20 | 2 | 18 | 1 | 2 | 1 |
| 38 | DF | (Hungary) HUN | Ádám Hajdú | 1 | 0 | 1 | 0 | 0 | 0 |

=== Top scorers ===
Includes all competitive matches. The list is sorted by shirt number when total goals are equal.

Last updated on 19 May 2019

| Position | Nation | Number | Name | OTP Bank Liga | Hungarian Cup | Total |
|---|---|---|---|---|---|---|
| 1 | (Hungary) | 9 | János Hahn | 9 | 2 | 11 |
| 2 | (Hungary) | 16 | Mohamed Remili | 4 | 2 | 6 |
| 3 | (Hungary) | 90 | András Simon | 5 | 0 | 5 |
| 4 | (Hungary) | 5 | Zsolt Gévay | 3 | 1 | 4 |
| 5 | (Hungary) | 8 | Tamás Kecskés | 2 | 0 | 2 |
| 6 | (Hungary) | 42 | Norbert Könyves | 2 | 0 | 2 |
| 7 | (Hungary) | 39 | László Bartha | 1 | 1 | 2 |
| 8 | (Hungary) | 26 | Lajos Bertus | 1 | 1 | 2 |
| 9 | (Hungary) | 77 | Dávid Kulcsár | 1 | 0 | 1 |
| 10 | (Hungary) | 17 | Kristóf Papp | 1 | 0 | 1 |
| 11 | (Hungary) | 30 | János Szabó | 1 | 0 | 1 |
| 12 | (Hungary) | 6 | Benjámin Cseke | 1 | 0 | 1 |
| 13 | (Hungary) | 12 | Richárd Nagy | 0 | 1 | 1 |
| 14 | (Hungary) | 10 | Zsolt Haraszti | 0 | 1 | 1 |
| 15 | (Hungary) | 17 | Tamás Egerszegi | 0 | 1 | 1 |
| 16 | (Hungary) | 96 | Bence Lenzsér | 0 | 1 | 1 |
| / | / | / | Own Goals | 2 | 1 | 3 |
| | | | TOTALS | 33 | 12 | 45 |

=== Disciplinary record ===
Includes all competitive matches. Players with 1 card or more included only.

Last updated on 19 May 2019

| Position | Nation | Number | Name | OTP Bank Liga | | Hungarian Cup | | Total (Hu Total) | |
| Position | Nation | Number | Name | Booked | Sent off (straight red) | Booked | Sent off (straight red) | Booked | Sent off (straight red) |
| GK | (Hungary) | 1 | Gergely Nagy | 3 | 0 | 0 | 0 | 3 (3) | 0 (0) |
| DF | (Hungary) | 2 | Dávid Bobál | 2 | 0 | 0 | 0 | 2 (2) | 0 (0) |
| DF | (Hungary) | 5 | Zsolt Gévay | 5 | 0 | 0 | 0 | 5 (5) | 0 (0) |
| DF | (Hungary) | 7 | Tamás Báló | 1 | 1 | 0 | 0 | 1 (1) | 1 (1) |
| MF | (Hungary) | 8 | Tamás Kecskés | 4 | 0 | 0 | 0 | 4 (4) | 0 (0) |
| FW | (Hungary) | 9 | János Hahn | 4 | 0 | 0 | 0 | 4 (4) | 0 (0) |
| MF | (Hungary) | 10 | Zsolt Haraszti | 5 | 0 | 1 | 0 | 6 (5) | 0 (0) |
| FW | (Hungary) | 12 | Richárd Nagy | 1 | 0 | 1 | 0 | 2 (1) | 0 (0) |
| DF | (Hungary) | 14 | András Fejes | 6 | 0 | 1 | 0 | 7 (6) | 0 (0) |
| FW | (Hungary) | 15 | Péter Horváth | 2 | 0 | 0 | 0 | 2 (2) | 0 (0) |
| MF | (Hungary) | 16 | Mohamed Remili | 4 | 0 | 1 | 0 | 5 (4) | 0 (0) |
| MF | (Hungary) | 17 | Tamás Egerszegi | 1 | 0 | 2 | 0 | 3 (1) | 0 (0) |
| DF | (Hungary) | 19 | Barna Kesztyűs | 1 | 0 | 0 | 0 | 1 (1) | 0 (0) |
| MF | (Hungary) | 21 | Kristóf Papp | 9 | 1 | 0 | 0 | 9 (9) | 1 (1) |
| MF | (Hungary) | 22 | József Windecker | 3 | 0 | 0 | 0 | 3 (3) | 0 (0) |
| DF | (Hungary) | 23 | András Vági | 1 | 0 | 1 | 0 | 2 (1) | 0 (0) |
| DF | (Hungary) | 25 | Máté Berdó | 0 | 0 | 1 | 0 | 1 (0) | 0 (0) |
| MF | (Hungary) | 27 | Róbert Kővári | 1 | 0 | 0 | 0 | 1 (1) | 0 (0) |
| MF | (Hungary) | 28 | László Zsidai | 3 | 0 | 0 | 0 | 3 (3) | 0 (0) |
| DF | (Hungary) | 30 | János Szabó | 2 | 0 | 0 | 0 | 2 (2) | 0 (0) |
| GK | (Hungary) | 31 | Gergő Rácz | 0 | 0 | 1 | 0 | 1 (0) | 0 (0) |
| MF | (Hungary) | 39 | László Bartha | 2 | 0 | 0 | 1 | 2 (2) | 1 (0) |
| FW | (Hungary) | 42 | Norbert Könyves | 2 | 1 | 2 | 0 | 4 (2) | 1 (1) |
| MF | (Hungary) | 46 | Ádám Simon | 2 | 0 | 0 | 0 | 2 (2) | 0 (0) |
| DF | (Hungary) | 77 | Dávid Kulcsár | 6 | 0 | 1 | 0 | 7 (6) | 0 (0) |
| FW | (Hungary) | 90 | András Simon | 3 | 2 | 2 | 0 | 5 (3) | 2 (2) |
| DF | (Hungary) | 96 | Bence Lenzsér | 13 | 1 | 2 | 0 | 15 (13) | 1 (1) |
| | | | TOTALS | 86 | 6 | 16 | 1 | 102 (86) | 7 (6) |

=== Overall ===
| Games played | 38 (33 OTP Bank Liga and 5 Hungarian Cup) |
| Games won | 12 (9 OTP Bank Liga and 3 Hungarian Cup) |
| Games drawn | 13 (12 OTP Bank Liga and 1 Hungarian Cup) |
| Games lost | 13 (12 OTP Bank Liga and 1 Hungarian Cup) |
| Goals scored | 45 |
| Goals conceded | 53 |
| Goal difference | -8 |
| Yellow cards | 102 |
| Red cards | 7 |
| Worst discipline | (Hungary) Bence Lenzsér (15 (yellow card) , 1 (red card) ) |
| Best result | 5–0 (A) v Siklós - Magyar Kupa - 22-09-2018 |
| Worst result | 0–4 (H) v MOL Vidi - Nemzeti Bajnokság I - 3-11-2018 |
| Most appearances | (Hungary) János Hahn (35 appearances) |
| Top scorer | (Hungary) János Hahn (11 goals) |
| Points | 49/114 (42.98%) |

Last updated: 19 May 2019

== Nemzeti Bajnokság I ==
=== Matches ===
| 21 July 2018 1 | Mezőkövesd | 3 – 1 | Paks | Mezőkövesd, Borsod-Abaúj-Zemplén County |
| 20:15 CEST | Dražić 30'; Szalai 39'; Kulcsár 81' (o.g.) | Report | Kulcsár 33' | Stadium: Mezőkövesdi Városi Stadion; Attendance: 1,977; Referee: (Hungary) József Erdős |

| 28 July 2018 2 | MOL Vidi | 1 – 1 | Paks | Felcsút, Fejér County |
| 19:30 CEST | Á. Simon 28' (o.g.) | Report | A. Simon 22' | Stadium: Pancho Arena; Attendance: 1,058; Referee: (Hungary) Péter Solymosi |

| 5 August 2018 3 | Budapest Honvéd | 1 – 0 | Paks | Budapest, Pest County |
| 18:00 CEST | Danilo 49' (pen.) | Report | | Stadium: Bozsik Stadion; Attendance: 1,740; Referee: (Hungary) Viktor Kassai |

| 12 August 2018 4 | Paks | 1 – 1 | Újpest | Paks, Tolna County |
| 17:00 CEST | Bertus 24' | Report | Diallo 3' | Stadium: Fehérvári úti Stadion; Attendance: 750; Referee: (Hungary) Balázs Berke |

| 18 August 2018 5 | Ferencváros | 1 – 1 | Paks | Budapest, Pest County |
| 17:00 CEST | Petryak 3' | Report | Hahn 47' | Stadium: Groupama Arena; Attendance: 7,147; Referee: (Hungary) József Erdős |

| 25 August 2018 6 | Paks | 3 – 2 | Puskás Akadémia | Paks, Tolna County |
| 19:30 CEST | Hahn 13', 90+3'; Hegedűs 68' (o.g.) | Report | Arabuli 76'; Latifi 81' | Stadium: Fehérvári úti Stadion; Attendance: 600; Referee: (Hungary) Ádám Farkas |

| 1 September 2018 7 | Diósgyőr | 0 – 0 | Paks | Miskolc, Borsod-Abaúj-Zemplén County |
| 19:30 CEST | | Report | | Stadium: Diósgyőri Stadion; Attendance: 3,872; Referee: (Hungary) Sándor Andó-Szabó |

| 15 September 2018 8 | Paks | 3 – 0 | MTK Budapest | Paks, Tolna County |
| 17:00 CEST | Hahn 31'; Kecskés 73'; A. Simon 90+4' | Report | | Stadium: Fehérvári úti Stadion; Attendance: 864; Referee: (Hungary) Zoltán Iványi |

| 29 September 2018 9 | Szombathelyi Haladás | 1 – 2 | Paks | Szombathely, Vas County |
| 17:00 CEST | Priskin 51' | (Report) | A. Simon 62'; Kecskés 89' | Stadium: Haladás Sportkomplexum; Attendance: 2,846; Referee: (Hungary) Péter Solymosi |

| 6 October 2018 10 | Paks | 4 – 1 | Kisvárda | Paks, Tolna County |
| 17:00 CEST | Hahn 16'; Remili 19'; Gévay 42', 90+2' | Report | Horváth 9' | Stadium: Fehérvári úti Stadion; Attendance: 600; Referee: (Hungary) Ádám Radványi |

| 20 October 2018 11 | Debrecen | 2 – 1 | Paks | Debrecen, Hajdú-Bihar County |
| 17:00 CEST | Pávkovics 23'; Bódi 90+3' | Report | A. Simon 74' | Stadium: Nagyerdei Stadion; Attendance: 2,719; Referee: (Hungary) Ferenc Karakó |

| 27 October 2018 12 | Paks | 2 – 1 | Mezőkövesd | Paks, Tolna County |
| 17:00 CEST | Hahn 42'; Gévay 70' | (Report) | Molnár 90+1' | Stadium: Fehérvári úti Stadion; Attendance: 800; Referee: (Hungary) József Erdős |

| 3 November 2018 13 | Paks | 0 – 4 | MOL Vidi | Paks, Tolna County |
| 17:00 CET | | (Report) | Pátkai 18', 56'; Nego 27'; Hodžić 34' | Stadium: Fehérvári úti Stadion; Attendance: 1,269; Referee: (Hungary) Viktor Kassai |

| 10 November 2018 14 | Paks | 0 – 0 | Budapest Honvéd | Paks, Tolna County |
| 17:00 CET | | Report | | Stadium: Fehérvári úti Stadion; Attendance: 1,283; Referee: (Hungary) Gergely Szőts |

| 24 November 2018 15 | Újpest | 1 – 1 | Paks | Budapest, Pest County |
| 17:00 CET | Beridze 61' | Report | Bartha 84' | Stadium: Szusza Ferenc Stadion; Attendance: 1,435; Referee: (Hungary) Péter Solymosi |

| 1 December 2018 16 | Paks | 0 – 3 | Ferencváros | Paks, Tolna County |
| 19:30 CET | | Report | Böde 16'; Blažič 26'; Varga 67' | Stadium: Fehérvári úti Stadion; Attendance: 1,916; Referee: (Hungary) József Erdős |

| 8 December 2018 17 | Puskás Akadémia | 1 – 1 | Paks | Felcsút, Fejér County |
| 17:00 CET | Arabuli 90+4' | Report | Remili 32' | Stadium: Pancho Arena; Attendance: 527; Referee: (Hungary) Bognár |

| 15 December 2018 18 | Paks | 1 – 2 | Diósgyőr | Paks, Tolna County |
| 17:00 CET | Papp 17' | Report | Tajti 15'; Hasani 63' | Stadium: Fehérvári úti Stadion; Attendance: 250; Referee: (Hungary) Ádám Németh |

| 2 February 2019 19 | MTK Budapest | 1 – 2 | Paks | Budapest, Pest County |
| 14:00 CET | Bognár 85' | Report | Remili 41'; Szabó 76' | Stadium: Hidegkuti Nándor Stadion; Attendance: 1,381; Referee: (Hungary) Tamás Bognár |

| 9 February 2019 20 | Paks | 1 – 1 | Szombathelyi Haladás | Paks, Tolna County |
| 17:00 CET | A. Simon 30' | Report | Bamgboye 82' | Stadium: Fehérvári úti Stadion; Attendance: 1,000; Referee: (Hungary) Péter Solymosi |

| 16 February 2019 21 | Kisvárda | 0 – 0 | Paks | Kisvárda, Szabolcs-Szatmár-Bereg County |
| 17:00 CET | | Report | | Stadium: Várkert Sportpálya; Attendance: 2,007; Referee: (Hungary) Ádám Farkas |

| 23 February 2019 22 | Paks | 2 – 1 | Debrecen | Paks, Tolna County |
| 17:00 CET | Nad 63' (o.g.); Hahn 68' (pen.) | Report | Varga 54' | Stadium: Fehérvári úti Stadion; Attendance: 796; Referee: (Hungary) Csaba Pintér |

| 2 March 2019 23 | Mezőkövesd | 2 – 0 | Paks | Mezőkövesd, Borsod-Abaúj-Zemplén County |
| 17:00 CET | Koszta 67'; Molnár 90+1' | Report | | Stadium: Mezőkövesdi Városi Stadion; Attendance: 1,542; Referee: (Hungary) Ferenc Karakó |

| 9 March 2019 24 | Paks | 2 – 2 | MOL Vidi | Paks, Tolna County |
| 17:00 CET | Hahn 22'; Könyves 43' | Report | Stopira 35'; Šćepović 55' | Stadium: Fehérvári úti Stadion; Attendance: 1,400; Referee: (Hungary) István Vad |

| 16 March 2019 25 | Budapest Honvéd | 3 – 0 | Paks | Budapest, Pest County |
| 17:00 CET | Holender 27', 38'; Ngog 55' | Report | | Stadium: Hidegkuti Nándor Stadion; Attendance: 1,400; Referee: (Hungary) Csaba Pintér |

| 30 March 2019 26 | Paks | 0 – 2 | Újpest | Paks, Tolna County |
| 17:00 CET | | Report | Bobál 60' (o.g.); Traoré 68' (pen.) | Stadium: Fehérvári úti Stadion; Attendance: 1,400; Referee: (Hungary) Ádám Farkas |

| 6 April 2019 27 | Ferencváros | 3 – 0 | Paks | Budapest, Pest County |
| 17:00 CEST | Lenzsér 1' (o.g.); Nguen 50'; Böde 80' | Report | | Stadium: Groupama Arena; Attendance: 9,673; Referee: (Hungary) Gergő Bogár |

| 13 April 2019 28 | Paks | 0 – 0 | Puskás Akadémia | Paks, Tolna County |
| 17:00 CEST | | Report | | Stadium: Fehérvári úti Stadion; Attendance: 850; Referee: (Hungary) Viktor Kassai |

| 20 April 2019 29 | Diósgyőr | 1 – 0 | Paks | Miskolc, Borsod-Abaúj-Zemplén County |
| 17:00 CEST | Prosser 27' | Report | | Stadium: Diósgyőri Stadion; Attendance: 3,269; Referee: (Hungary) Zoltán Iványi |

| 27 April 2019 30 | Paks | 1 – 0 | MTK Budapest | Paks, Tolna County |
| 17:00 CEST | Hahn 25' | Report | | Stadium: Fehérvári úti Stadion; Attendance: 1,153; Referee: (Hungary) István Vad |

| 4 May 2019 31 | Szombathelyi Haladás | 1 – 1 | Paks | Szombathely, Vas County |
| 17:00 CEST | Priskin 65' (pen.) | Report | Remili 90+3' | Stadium: Haladás Sportkomplexum; Attendance: 4,246; Referee: (Hungary) Balázs Berke |

| 11 May 2019 32 | Paks | 1 – 0 | Kisvárda | Paks, Tolna County |
| 17:00 CEST | Könyves 73' | Report | | Stadium: Fehérvári úti Stadion; Attendance: 1,702; Referee: (Hungary) Sándor Andó-Szabó |

| 19 May 2019 33 | Debrecen | 4 – 1 | Paks | Debrecen, Hajdú-Bihar County |
| 17:00 CEST | Szécsi 19', 33'; Bódi 23'; Tőzsér 52' (pen.) | Report | Cseke 30' | Stadium: Nagyerdei Stadion; Attendance: 6,000; Referee: (Hungary) József Erdős |

=== League table ===
| Pos | Team | Pld | W | D | L | GF | GA | GD | Pts |
|---|---|---|---|---|---|---|---|---|---|
| 6 | Mezőkövesd | 33 | 12 | 8 | 13 | 45 | 40 | +5 | 44 |
| 7 | Puskás Akadémia | 33 | 11 | 7 | 15 | 36 | 45 | −9 | 40 |
| 8 | Paks | 33 | 9 | 12 | 12 | 33 | 46 | −13 | 39 |
| 9 | Kisvárda | 33 | 10 | 8 | 15 | 36 | 48 | −12 | 38 |
| 10 | Diósgyőr | 33 | 10 | 8 | 15 | 36 | 57 | −21 | 38 |

Source: Hungarian Football Federation (in Hungarian), Soccerway
Rules for classification: 1) Points; 2) Matches won; 3) Goal difference; 4) Goals scored; 5) Head-to-head points; 6) Head-to-head goal difference; 7) Head-to-head away goals scored; 8) Fair play ranking; 9) Drawing of lots.

=== Results summary ===
| Overall | | | | | | | | Home | | | | | | Away | | | | | |
| Pld | W | D | L | GF | GA | GD | Pts | W | D | L | GF | GA | GD | W | D | L | GF | GA | GD |
|---|---|---|---|---|---|---|---|---|---|---|---|---|---|---|---|---|---|---|---|
| 33 | 9 | 12 | 12 | 33 | 46 | −13 | 39 | 7 | 5 | 4 | 21 | 20 | +1 | 2 | 7 | 8 | 12 | 26 | −14 |

Last updated: 19 May 2019.
Source: NB1

=== Results by round ===
| Round | 1 | 2 | 3 | 4 | 5 | 6 | 7 | 8 | 9 | 10 | 11 | 12 | 13 | 14 | 15 | 16 | 17 | 18 | 19 | 20 | 21 | 22 | 23 | 24 | 25 | 26 | 27 | 28 | 29 | 30 | 31 | 32 | 33 |
|---|---|---|---|---|---|---|---|---|---|---|---|---|---|---|---|---|---|---|---|---|---|---|---|---|---|---|---|---|---|---|---|---|---|
| Ground | A | A | A | H | A | H | A | H | A | H | A | H | H | H | A | H | A | H | A | H | A | H | A | H | A | H | A | H | A | H | A | H | A |
| Result | L | D | L | D | D | W | D | W | W | W | L | W | L | D | D | L | D | L | W | D | D | W | L | D | L | L | L | D | L | W | D | W | L |
| Position | 9 | 9 | 10 | 9 | 10 | 6 | 7 | 6 | 5 | 5 | 7 | 6 | 8 | 8 | 8 | 8 | 8 | 8 | 8 | 7 | 8 | 7 | 8 | 8 | 8 | 8 | 8 | 8 | 10 | 8 | 8 | 8 | 8 |

Updated to match(es) played on 19 May 2019. Source: Matches
A = Away; H = Home; W = Win; D = Draw; L = Loss

== Hungarian Cup ==
| 22 September 2018 Round 6 | Siklós | 0 – 5 | Paks | Siklós, Baranya County |
| 15:00 CEST | | Report | Horváth 15' (o.g.); Nagy 22'; Bartha 28'; Remili 68'; Haraszti 76' | Stadium: Mehring Lajos Sporttelep; Attendance: 400; Referee: (Hungary) Balázs Böcskei |

| 31 October 2018 Round 7 | Csákvár | 1 – 2 | Paks | Csákvár, Fejér County |
| 15:00 CET | Molnár 30' (pen.) | Report | Remili 74'; Hahn 76' | Stadium: Tersztyánszky Ödön Sportközpont; Attendance: 300; Referee: (Hungary) Róbert Nagy |

| 5 December 2018 Round of 32 | Siófok | 2 – 2 (a.e.t.) (5 – 6 p) | Paks | Siófok, Somogy County |
| 15:00 CET | Tóth 6'; Elek 69' | Report | Gévay 44'; Bertus 84' (pen.) | Stadium: Révész Géza utcai Stadion; Attendance: 100; Referee: (Hungary) Gábor Oláh |
| | Penalties |
| | Réti (penalty scored); Fehér (penalty scored); Bolla (penalty scored); Zamostny (penalty scored); Elek (penalty scored) | | Haraszti (penalty scored); Kecskés (penalty scored); Hahn (penalty scored); Bertus (penalty scored); Gévay (penalty scored); Fejes (penalty scored) |

| 20 February 2019 Round of 16 (leg 1) | Puskás Akadémia | 1 – 2 | Paks | Felcsút, Fejér County |
| 15:00 CET | Radó 49' | Report | Egerszegi 11'; Hahn 87' (pen.) | Stadium: Pancho Aréna; Attendance: 417; Referee: (Hungary) József Erdős |

| 26 February 2019 Round of 16 (leg 2) | Paks | 1 – 3 (3 – 4 agg.) | Puskás Akadémia | Paks, Tolna County |
| 17:00 CET | Lenzsér 17' | Report | Latifi 23', 75', 82' (pen.) | Stadium: Fehérvári úti Stadion; Attendance: 400; Referee: (Hungary) Sándor Andó-Szabó |
