= 2016–17 Paksi FC season =

Paks
2016–17 season
- Chairman: Péter Bognár
- Manager: Aurél Csertői
- Stadium: Fehérvári úti Stadion
- Nemzeti Bajnokság I: 5th
- Magyar Kupa: Round of 64
- Top goalscorer: League: László Bartha (11); All: László Bartha (11)
- Highest home attendance: 4,217 v Ferencváros (6 August 2016, Nemzeti Bajnokság I)
- Lowest home attendance: 600 v Gyirmót (13 May 2017, Nemzeti Bajnokság I)
- Average home league attendance: 1,532
- Biggest win: 5–0 v Mezőkövesd (Home, 25 February 2017, Nemzeti Bajnokság I)
- Biggest defeat: 1–5 v Videoton (Away, 22 October 2016, Nemzeti Bajnokság I)

The 2016–17 season was Paksi Football Club's 11th competitive season, 11th consecutive season in the Nemzeti Bajnokság I and 66th season in existence as a football club. In addition to the domestic league, Paks participated in that season's editions of the Magyar Kupa.

== Squad ==
Squad at end of season

Note: Flags indicate national team as defined under FIFA eligibility rules; some limited exceptions apply. Players may hold more than one non-FIFA nationality.

No.	Pos.	Nation	Player
1	GK	SVK	Péter Molnár
5	DF	HUN	Zsolt Gévay
7	DF	HUN	Tamás Báló
8	MF	HUN	Tamás Kecskés
9	MF	HUN	János Hahn
10	FW	HUN	Zsolt Haraszti
17	MF	HUN	Dénes Szakály
19	MF	HUN	Barna Kesztyűs
20	DF	HUN	Péter Zachán
21	MF	HUN	Kristóf Papp
22	MF	HUN	Áron Fejős
25	GK	HUN	György Székely

No.	Pos.	Nation	Player
26	MF	HUN	Lajos Bertus
29	MF	HUN	Tamás Koltai
30	DF	HUN	János Szabó
31	GK	HUN	Gergő Rácz
38	DF	HUN	Ádám Hajdú
39	MF	HUN	László Bartha
40	DF	HUN	András Szalai
70	MF	HUN	Richárd Vernes
77	DF	HUN	Dávid Kulcsár
94	FW	HUN	Bence Daru
96	DF	HUN	Bence Lenzsér
98	FW	HUN	Richárd Jelena

== Transfers ==
=== Transfers in ===
Transfer window	Pos.	No.	Player	From
Summer	DF	6	(Hungary) Gábor Kovács	Free agent (Note: Previous club Diósgyőr.)
Summer	FW	10	(Hungary) Zsolt Haraszti	Videoton
Summer	DF	20	(Hungary) Péter Zachán	Veszprém
Summer	MF	29	(Hungary) Tamás Koltai	Videoton
Summer	GK	31	(Hungary) Gergő Rácz	Ferencváros
Summer	DF	40	(Hungary) András Szalai	MTK
Summer	GK	71	(Hungary) Szabolcs Kemenes	Free agent (Note: Previous club Honvéd.)
Summer	MF	86	(Hungary) Zsolt Laczkó	Free agent (Note: Previous club Békéscsaba.)
Summer	FW	98	(Hungary) Richárd Jelena	Free agent (Note: Previous club Honvéd.)
Winter	MF	–	(Hungary) Dávid Bognár	Youth team
Winter	DF	–	(Hungary) Ádám Nagy	Youth team
Winter	MF	–	(Hungary) Márk Simon	Youth team

=== Transfers out ===
Transfer window	Pos.	No.	Player	To
Summer	FW	15	(Hungary) Antal Péter	SZEOL
Summer	DF	20	(Hungary) István Rodenbücher	Released (Note: Joined Szigetszentmiklós.)
Summer	MF	23	(Hungary) Tamás Szekszárdi	Kozármisleny
Summer	GK	24	(Hungary) Norbert Csernyánszki	Retired
Summer	FW	44	(Hungary) Bálint Bajner	(Italy) Modena
Winter	GK	71	(Hungary) Szabolcs Kemenes	Released

=== Loans in ===
Transfer window	Pos.	No.	Player	From	End date
Summer	MF	70	(Hungary) Richárd Vernes	Honvéd	End of season
Winter	DF	38	(Hungary) Ádám Hajdú	Honvéd	End of season
Winter	FW	94	(Hungary) Bence Daru	Zalaegerszeg	End of season

=== Loans out ===
Transfer window	Pos.	No.	Player	To	End date
Summer	FW	12	(Hungary) Richárd Nagy	SZEOL	End of season
Summer	DF	14	(Hungary) Dávid Bor	Dorog	End of season
Summer	DF	22	(Hungary) András Vági	Mezőkövesd	End of season
Summer	MF	27	(Hungary) Róbert Kővári	Dorog	End of season
Summer	DF	32	(Hungary) Dávid Kelemen	Békéscsaba	End of season
Summer	FW	92	(Hungary) Zsolt Balázs	Honvéd	End of season
Winter	DF	6	(Hungary) Gábor Kovács	Zalaegerszeg	End of season
Winter	MF	86	(Hungary) Zsolt Laczkó	Honvéd	End of season

== Competitions ==
=== Overview ===
Competition	First match	Last match	Starting round	Final position	Record							
Competition	First match	Last match	Starting round	Final position	Pld	W	D	L	GF	GA	GD	Win %
Nemzeti Bajnokság I	17 July 2016	27 May 2017	Matchday 1	5th	33	11	12	10	41	37	+4	33.33
Magyar Kupa	14 September 2016	26 October 2016	Round of 128	Round of 64	2	1	0	1	3	3	+0	50.00
Total					35	12	12	11	44	40	+4	34.29

Source: Competitions

=== Nemzeti Bajnokság I ===
==== League table ====
Pos	Team	Pld	W	D	L	GF	GA	GD	Pts	Qualification or relegation
3	Vasas	33	15	7	11	50	40	+10	52	Qualification for the Europa League first qualifying round (Note: Ferencváros qualified for the Europa League first qualifying round by winning the 2016–17 Magyar Kupa.)
4	Ferencváros	33	14	10	9	54	44	+10	52	Qualification for the Europa League first qualifying round
5	Paks	33	11	12	10	41	37	+4	45	
6	Haladás	33	12	7	14	42	46	−4	43	
7	Újpest	33	10	12	11	47	51	−4	42	

Source: Hungarian Football Federation (in Hungarian), Soccerway
Rules for classification: 1) Points; 2) Matches won; 3) Goal difference; 4) Goals scored; 5) Head-to-head points; 6) Head-to-head goal difference; 7) Head-to-head away goals scored; 8) Fairplay; 9) Draw.

==== Results summary ====
Overall								Home						Away					
Pld	W	D	L	GF	GA	GD	Pts	W	D	L	GF	GA	GD	W	D	L	GF	GA	GD
33	11	12	10	41	37	+4	45	6	9	1	21	9	+12	5	3	9	20	28	−8

Source: Hungarian Football Federation

==== Results by round ====
Round	1	2	3	4	5	6	7	8	9	10	11	12	13	14	15	16	17	18	19	20	21	22	23	24	25	26	27	28	29	30	31	32	33
Ground	A	H	A	H	A	H	A	A	H	A	H	H	A	H	A	H	A	H	H	A	H	A	A	H	A	H	A	H	A	A	H	A	H
Result	D	D	L	D	L	W	L	L	D	W	D	D	L	D	W	D	L	W	W	D	W	W	W	D	D	W	L	L	L	W	W	L	D
Position	8	7	8	10	10	9	11	11	11	9	10	11	12	11	10	10	11	9	8	8	8	8	5	6	6	5	6	7	7	6	5	5	5
Points	1	2	2	3	3	6	6	6	7	10	11	12	12	13	16	17	17	20	23	24	27	30	33	34	35	38	38	38	38	41	44	44	45

Source: Matches
A = Away; H = Home; W = Win; D = Draw; L = Loss

==== Matches ====
17 July 2016 1	Debrecen	1–1	Paks	Debrecen
18:00 CEST (UTC+2)	Takács 37', (yellow card) 56'; Holman (yellow card) 53'	Report	Papp (yellow card) 44'; Bartha 59'; Kulcsár (yellow card) 61'; Hahn (yellow card) 89'	Stadium: Nagyerdei Stadion; Attendance: 2,851; Referee: Balázs Berke; Assistant referees: Dr. Zsolt Varga, Tamás Márkus; Fourth official: János Medovarszki; Goal-line assistants: József Erdős, Gábor Oláh

24 July 2016 2	Paks	1–1	Videoton	Paks
18:00 CEST (UTC+2)	Szabó (yellow card) 11'; Gévay 52', (yellow card) 55'	Report	Feczesin 26', (yellow card) 55'; Pátkai (yellow card) 30'; Négo (yellow card) 31'	Stadium: Fehérvári úti Stadion; Attendance: 2,136; Referee: Ferenc Karakó; Assistant referees: Oszkár Lémon, Balázs Buzás; Fourth official: Gábor Kormányos II; Goal-line assistants: Zoltán Iványi, János Takács

30 July 2016 3	Újpest	1–0	Paks	Budapest (Note: The match was played at the Illovszky Rudolf Stadion in Budapest, instead of Újpest regular stadium, the Szusza Ferenc Stadion in Budapest, due to the renovation work.)
18:00 CEST (UTC+2)	T. Nagy (yellow card) 8'; Lázok 11'; B. Balázs (yellow card) 70'	Report	Z. Balázs (yellow card) 90'; Bartha (red card) 90+2'; Gévay (yellow card) 90+2'	Stadium: Illovszky Rudolf Stadion; Attendance: 3,000; Referee: Csaba Pintér; Assistant referees: Péter Berettyán, Péter Kóbor; Fourth official: Balázs Huszár; Goal-line assistants: Gergely Szőts, János Takács

6 August 2016 4	Paks	0–0	Ferencváros	Paks
18:00 CEST (UTC+2)	Haraszti (yellow card) 45'; Papp (yellow card) 62'; Kulcsár (yellow card) 74'	Report	Trinks (yellow card) 37'; Ramírez (yellow card) 45'; Leandro (yellow card) 51'; Nalepa (yellow card) 77'; Nagy (yellow card) 88'	Stadium: Fehérvári úti Stadion; Attendance: 4,217; Referee: Sándor Andó-Szabó; Assistant referees: Dr. Zsolt Varga, Gábor Kormányos II; Fourth official: Gergely Becséri; Goal-line assistants: Gábor Oláh, Gyöngyi Gaál

13 August 2016 5	Honvéd	3–1	Paks	Budapest
18:00 CEST (UTC+2)	Botka (yellow card) 26'; Eppel 67', 77'; Vasiljević (yellow card) 73', (goal) 78'; Vernes (yellow card) 84'	Report	Kecskés (yellow card) 13'; Hahn 16'; Lenzsér (yellow card) 45'; Gévay (yellow card) 56'; Kulcsár (red card) 75'; Kemenes (yellow card) 77'; Báló (yellow card) 81'	Stadium: Bozsik József Stadion; Attendance: 1,461; Referee: Péter Solymosi; Assistant referees: Gábor Varga Jr., Gergely Becséri; Fourth official: Balázs Szert; Goal-line assistants: Gergely Szőts, Tamás Nazsa

17 August 2016 6	Paks	2–1	Diósgyőr	Paks
19:00 CEST (UTC+2)	Hahn (yellow card) 12'; Lenzsér (yellow card) 34'; Bartha 81'; Bertus 90'	Report	Nemes (yellow card) 43'; Nikházi 64'; Griffiths (yellow card) 83'; Lázár (yellow card) 88'	Stadium: Fehérvári úti Stadion; Attendance: 1,267; Referee: Zoltán Iványi; Assistant referees: Georgiou Theodoros, János Medovarszki; Fourth official: Gábor Kormányos II; Goal-line assistants: Szabolcs Szilasi, László Lovas

21 August 2016 7	Haladás	3–1	Paks	Sopron (Note: The match was played at the Káposztás utcai Stadion in Sopron, instead of Haladás regular stadium, the Rohonci út in Szombathely, which was demolished to make way to the newly built Haladás Sportkomplexum.)
18:00 CEST (UTC+2)	Halmosi (yellow card) 15'; Gaál 28'; Williams 69'; Gévay 72' (o.g.)	Report	Koltai 16'; Kulcsár (yellow card) 25'; Papp (yellow card) 51'; Gévay (yellow card) 71'	Stadium: Káposztás utcai Stadion; Attendance: 1,375; Referee: Ferenc Karakó; Assistant referees: Attila Kelemen, Balázs Szert; Fourth official: Oszkár Lémon; Goal-line assistants: István Vad, Ádám Radványi

10 September 2016 8	Vasas	1–0	Paks	Budapest
18:00 CEST (UTC+2)	Ádám (yellow card) 27'; Kulcsár 33'; Vaskó (yellow card) 89'	Report	Kecskés (yellow card) 7'; Lenzsér (yellow card) 31'	Stadium: Illovszky Rudolf Stadion; Attendance: 3,612; Referee: István Vad; Assistant referees: Vencel Tóth II, Arnold Kepe; Fourth official: Balázs Huszár; Goal-line assistants: Csaba Pintér, Attila Molnár

17 September 2016 9	Paks	0–0	Gyirmót	Paks
18:30 CEST (UTC+2)		Report		Stadium: Fehérvári úti Stadion; Attendance: 623; Referee: Péter Solymosi; Assistant referees: Balázs Buzás, Dr. Zsolt Varga; Fourth official: Tamás Márkus; Goal-line assistants: Róbert Nagy, Tibor Gyarmati II

21 September 2016 10	Mezőkövesd	1–3	Paks	Mezőkövesd
19:00 CEST (UTC+2)	Frőhlich 13'; Egerszegi (yellow card) 53'; Fótyik (yellow card) 61'	Report	Haraszti 19'; Bartha 41'; Hahn 57'; Kecskés (red card) 73'	Stadium: Városi Stadion; Attendance: 1,215; Referee: József Erdős; Assistant referees: Gábor Erős, Balázs Szalai; Fourth official: Róbert Horváth; Goal-line assistants: Péter Solymosi, Ádám Farkas

24 September 2016 11	Paks	0–0	MTK	Paks
18:00 CEST (UTC+2)	Papp (yellow card) 41'	Report	Vadnai (yellow card) 41'; Torghelle (yellow card) 44'; Vogyicska (yellow card) 62'; Vukmir (yellow card) 81'	Stadium: Fehérvári úti Stadion; Attendance: 789; Referee: István Vad; Assistant referees: Oszkár Lémon, Balázs Huszár; Fourth official: Péter Kóbor; Goal-line assistants: Tamás Bognár, Katalin Kulcsár

15 October 2016 12	Paks	1–1	Debrecen	Paks
18:00 CEST (UTC+2)	Bartha 13'; Papp (yellow card) 72'	Report	Vittek 47', (yellow card) 90+2'	Stadium: Fehérvári úti Stadion; Attendance: 836; Referee: Gergely Szőts; Assistant referees: István Albert, Balázs Buzás; Fourth official: Oszkár Lémon; Goal-line assistants: Zoltán Iványi, Gábor Oláh

22 October 2016 13	Videoton	5–1	Paks	Felcsút (Note: The match was played at the Pancho Aréna in Felcsút, instead of Videoton regular stadium, the Sóstói Stadion in Székesfehérvár, built in 1967 which was demolished to make way to the newly built Sóstói Stadion.)
15:30 CEST (UTC+2)	Géresi 11'; Šćepović 24', 38'; Hadžić 48'; Négo (yellow card) 58'; Lazović 62'; Szolnoki (yellow card) 81'; Juhász (yellow card) 84'	Report	Hahn 4'; Szabó (red card) 43'; Kecskés (red card) 50'	Stadium: Pancho Aréna; Attendance: 1,446; Referee: Ádám Farkas; Assistant referees: Péter Berettyán, Attila Kelemen; Fourth official: Zoltán Horváth; Goal-line assistants: Tamás Bognár, Róbert Nagy

29 October 2016 14	Paks	1–1	Újpest	Paks
18:00 CEST (UTC+2)	Gévay (yellow card) 40'; Kulcsár (yellow card) 58'; Báló (yellow card) 67'; Szakály 88'; Vernes (yellow card) 90+1'	Report	B. Balázs 9'; Heris (yellow card) 40'; Kecskés (red card) 90+4'	Stadium: Fehérvári úti Stadion; Attendance: 1,234; Referee: Tamás Bognár; Assistant referees: Gábor Erős, Tamás Márkus; Fourth official: Dr. Zsolt Varga; Goal-line assistants: Ádám Németh, Tibor Gyarmati II

5 November 2016 15	Ferencváros	1–2	Paks	Budapest
15:30 CET (UTC+1)	Hajnal (yellow card) 12'; Gera (yellow card) 38'; Busai 86'	Report	Hahn 14'; Laczkó (yellow card) 39'; Koltai 57'; Szalai (yellow card) 70'; Szakály (yellow card) 77'	Stadium: Groupama Arena; Attendance: 5,592; Referee: Csaba Pintér; Assistant referees: Attila Kelemen, Gergely Becséri; Fourth official: Gábor Varga Jr. Goal-line assistants: Balázs Berke, Eszter Urbán

19 November 2016 16	Paks	1–1	Honvéd	Paks
15:30 CET (UTC+1)	Szabó 8'; Gévay (yellow card) 48'; Kecskés (yellow card) 62'; Lenzsér (yellow card) 64'	Report	Szabó 45' (o.g.); Botka (yellow card) 54'; Gazdag (yellow card) 65'; Hidi (yellow card) 74'; Prosser (yellow card) 85'	Stadium: Fehérvári úti Stadion; Attendance: 1,118; Referee: Zsolt Szabó; Assistant referees: Gábor Erős, Róbert Horváth; Fourth official: Gábor Kormányos II; Goal-line assistants: János Takács, Tibor Gyarmati II

26 November 2016 17	Diósgyőr	2–0	Paks	Mezőkövesd (Note: The match was played at the Városi Stadion in Mezőkövesd, instead of Diósgyőr regular stadium, the Diósgyőri Stadion in Miskolc, opened in 1939 which was demolished to make way to the newly built Diósgyőri Stadion.)
15:30 CET (UTC+1)	Lipták 59', (yellow card) 65'; Elek (yellow card) 66'; Ugrai (yellow card) 80', (goal) 90+2'	Report	Gévay (yellow card) 66'; Koltai (yellow card) 90+3'	Stadium: Városi Stadion; Attendance: 1,769; Referee: Gergely Szőts; Assistant referees: György Ring, Balázs Szalai; Fourth official: Balázs Farkas; Goal-line assistants: István Vad, Ádám Németh

3 December 2016 18	Paks	2–1	Haladás	Paks
15:30 CET (UTC+1)	Koltai 14'; Szakály 60'; Hahn (yellow card) 74'; Laczkó (yellow card) 81'	Report	Gaál 38'; Ars (yellow card) 90+3'	Stadium: Fehérvári úti Stadion; Attendance: 927; Referee: Péter Solymosi; Assistant referees: Gábor Kormányos II, Róbert Horváth; Fourth official: Dr. Zsolt Varga; Goal-line assistants: Ádám Farkas, Róbert Nagy

10 December 2016 19	Paks	1–0	Vasas	Paks
15:30 CET (UTC+1)	Hahn 43'; Vernes (yellow card) 51'; Gévay (yellow card) 59'; Szakály (yellow card) 62'; Lenzsér (yellow card) 79'; Laczkó (yellow card) 87'	Report	Ádám (yellow card) 51'; Remili (yellow card) 59'; Burmeister (yellow card) 64'; Korcsmár (yellow card) 74'; Murka (yellow card) 89'	Stadium: Fehérvári úti Stadion; Attendance: 1,467; Referee: Ferenc Karakó

18 February 2017 20	Gyirmót	0–0	Paks	Győr
15:30 CET (UTC+1)	A. Simon (yellow card) 30'; Bori (yellow card) 65'	Report	Vernes (yellow card) 21'; Báló (yellow card) 67'	Stadium: Ménfői úti Stadion; Attendance: 764; Referee: Balázs Berke; Assistant referees: Balázs Huszár, Péter Kóbor; Fourth official: Gábor Varga Jr. Goal-line assistants: Szabolcs Szilasi, Tibor Gyarmati II

25 February 2017 21	Paks	5–0	Mezőkövesd	Paks
15:30 CET (UTC+1)	Szabó 19'; Gévay 26'; Kulcsár 31'; Papp 41'; Haraszti (yellow card) 59'; Bartha 86'	Report	Hudák (yellow card) 7'	Stadium: Fehérvári úti Stadion; Attendance: 1,023; Referee: Gergely Szőts; Assistant referees: Gábor Varga Jr., Balázs Szert; Fourth official: Balázs Szalai; Goal-line assistants: Csaba Pintér, Péter Zierkelbach

4 March 2017 22	MTK	1–2	Paks	Budapest
15:30 CET (UTC+1)	Vass (yellow card) 14'; Kanta 90+5'	Report	Vernes 15'; Szabó 22'; Szakály (yellow card) 67'	Stadium: Hidegkuti Nándor Stadion; Attendance: 1,818; Referee: Péter Solymosi; Assistant referees: Péter Berettyán, Tamás Márkus; Fourth official: Georgiou Theodoros; Goal-line assistants: Zsolt Szabó, Katalin Kulcsár

11 March 2017 23	Debrecen	1–3	Paks	Debrecen
15:30 CET (UTC+1)	Suk (yellow card) 38'; Brković (yellow card) 45'; Tőzsér 68'	Report	Papp (yellow card) 21'; Haraszti 61'; Kecskés (yellow card) 68'; Kulcsár 75'; Bartha 84'	Stadium: Nagyerdei Stadion; Attendance: 3,021; Referee: Csaba Pintér; Assistant referees: Oszkár Lémon, Krisztián Király; Fourth official: Tamás Márkus; Goal-line assistants: Róbert Nagy, Attila Molnár

1 April 2017 24	Paks	0–0	Videoton	Paks
18:00 CEST (UTC+2)	Kulcsár (yellow card) 66'; Gévay (yellow card) 90'	Report		Stadium: Fehérvári úti Stadion; Attendance: 2,487; Referee: József Erdős; Assistant referees: Péter Kóbor, Róbert Horváth; Fourth official: Balázs Huszár; Goal-line assistants: Róbert Nagy, Péter Zierkelbach

8 April 2017 25	Újpest	1–1	Paks	Budapest
18:00 CEST (UTC+2)	Kovács (yellow card) 31'; Diarra (yellow card) 49'; Heris 65'; Perović (yellow card) 90+3'	Report	Bartha 23'; Lenzsér (yellow card) 59'; Vernes (yellow card) 83'	Stadium: Szusza Ferenc Stadion; Attendance: 1,568; Referee: Ferenc Karakó; Assistant referees: Róbert Horváth, Gergely Becséri; Fourth official: Zoltán Horváth; Goal-line assistants: Balázs Berke, Katalin Kulcsár

12 April 2017 26	Paks	3–1	Ferencváros	Paks
18:00 CEST (UTC+2)	Bartha 29'; Szabó (yellow card) 39'; Haraszti 43'; Bertus (yellow card) 59'; Hajdú 79'	Report	Gera (yellow card) 61'; Djuricin (yellow card) 81'; Dilaver (yellow card) 83'; Böde 88'; Sternberg (yellow card) 90+1'	Stadium: Fehérvári úti Stadion; Attendance: 3,087; Referee: Viktor Kassai; Assistant referees: Péter Kóbor, Balázs Szert; Fourth official: Gábor Varga Jr. Goal-line assistants: Csaba Pintér, Attila Molnár

15 April 2017 27	Honvéd	2–0	Paks	Budapest
18:00 CEST (UTC+2)	Eppel 18'; Zsótér 39'	Report	Gévay (yellow card) 46'	Stadium: Bozsik József Stadion; Attendance: 1,994; Referee: Balázs Berke; Assistant referees: Dr. Zsolt Varga, Balázs Szalai; Fourth official: Balázs Farkas; Goal-line assistants: Gergely Szőts, Katalin Kulcsár

22 April 2017 28	Paks	0–1	Diósgyőr	Paks
18:00 CEST (UTC+2)	J. Szabó (yellow card) 13'; Lenzsér (yellow card) 90+4'	Report	Ugrai 14'; Novothny (yellow card) 54'	Stadium: Fehérvári úti Stadion; Attendance: 1,400; Referee: Tamás Bognár; Assistant referees: Vencel Tóth II, László Viszokai; Fourth official: Oszkár Lémon; Goal-line assistants: Ferenc Karakó, Tibor Gyarmati II

29 April 2017 29	Haladás	2–0	Paks	Sopron
18:00 CEST (UTC+2)	Jancsó 14'; Iszlai (yellow card) 37', (goal) 71'; Williams (yellow card) 56'; Tóth (yellow card) 85'	Report	Gévay (yellow card) 43'; Kulcsár (yellow card) 43'	Stadium: Káposztás utcai Stadion; Attendance: 1,445; Referee: Sándor Andó-Szabó; Assistant referees: György Ring, Balázs Szert; Fourth official: Gábor Varga Jr. Goal-line assistants: Péter Solymosi, Ádám Németh

6 May 2017 30	Vasas	0–3	Paks	Budapest (Note: The match was played at the Szusza Ferenc Stadion in Budapest, instead of Vasas regular stadium, the Illovszky Rudolf Stadion in Budapest, built in 1960 which was demolished to make way to the newly built Illovszky Rudolf Stadion.)
18:00 CEST (UTC+2)	Ristevski (yellow card) 30'; Korcsmár (yellow card) 54'	Report	Lenzsér 8'; Gévay (yellow card) 28'; D. Kulcsár (yellow card) 31'; Bartha 84'; Hahn 90+2'	Stadium: Szusza Ferenc Stadion; Attendance: 2,000; Referee: István Vad; Assistant referees: Georgiou Theodoros, Balázs Szalai; Fourth official: Zoltán Horváth; Goal-line assistants: Péter Zierkelbach, Gyöngyi Gaál

13 May 2017 31	Paks	3–0	Gyirmót	Paks
18:00 CEST (UTC+2)	Bartha 20'; Szakály 25', 31'; Lenzsér (yellow card) 75'; Báló (yellow card) 90'	Report	Kiss (yellow card) 51'	Stadium: Fehérvári úti Stadion; Attendance: 600; Referee: Tamás Bognár; Assistant referees: Oszkár Lémon, Balázs Farkas; Fourth official: Balázs Huszár; Goal-line assistants: Szabolcs Szilasi, Gyöngyi Gaál

20 May 2017 32	Mezőkövesd	3–2	Paks	Mezőkövesd
18:00 CEST (UTC+2)	Bačelić-Grgić 38', (yellow card) 43'; Vági (yellow card) 49'; G. Molnár (yellow card) 73'; Diallo 76'; Szeles (yellow card) 84'; Gohér 90+2'	Report	Hajdú (yellow card) 45'; Kulcsár 60', (yellow card) 68'; Bertus 89'	Stadium: Városi Stadion; Attendance: 1,390; Referee: Sándor Andó-Szabó; Assistant referees: Gergely Becséri, Róbert Horváth; Fourth official: Zoltán Horváth; Goal-line assistants: Gergely Szőts, Péter Zierkelbach

27 May 2017 33	Paks	1–1	MTK	Paks
19:00 CEST (UTC+2)	Gévay (yellow card) 33'; Papp (yellow card) 61'; Haraszti (yellow card) 63'; Bartha 90'	Report	Borbély (yellow card) 32'; Ramos (yellow card) 50'; Hrepka 90+2'	Stadium: Fehérvári úti Stadion; Attendance: 1,300; Referee: Zoltán Iványi; Assistant referees: Róbert Horváth, Balázs Szalai; Fourth official: Dr. Zsolt Varga; Goal-line assistants: Csaba Pintér, Ádám Radványi

=== Magyar Kupa ===
14 September 2016 Round of 128	Szekszárd	0–1	Paks	Szekszárd
15:30 CEST (UTC+2)	Koch (yellow card) 52'	Report	Lenzsér (yellow card) 48'; Kovács 52'	Stadium: Városi Stadion; Attendance: 400; Referee: Péter Zierkelbach; Assistant referees: István Iványi, András Éles

26 October 2016 Round of 64	Balmazújváros	3–2	Paks	Balmazújváros
13:30 CEST (UTC+2)	Belényesi 5'; Vachtler (yellow card) 20'; Máté 51'; Sigér (yellow card) 53'; Bakos 85'; Farkas (yellow card) 86'	Report	Zachán (yellow card) 34'; Gévay (yellow card) 51'; Bakos 57' (o.g.); Szakály (yellow card) 60'; Hahn 65'	Stadium: Városi Sportpálya; Attendance: 700; Referee: László Lovas; Assistant referees: János Medovarszki, Tibor Csatári

== Statistics ==
=== Overall ===
Appearances (Apps) numbers are for appearances in competitive games only, including sub appearances.
Source: Competitions

No.	Player	Pos.	Nemzeti Bajnokság I				Magyar Kupa				Total			
No.	Player	Pos.	Apps	Goal	Booked	Sent off (straight red)	Apps	Goal	Booked	Sent off (straight red)	Apps	Goal	Booked	Sent off (straight red)
1	(Slovakia) Péter Molnár	GK	15								15			
5	(Hungary) Zsolt Gévay	DF	31	2	13						31	2	13	
6	(Hungary) Gábor Kovács	DF	3				2	1			5	1		
7	(Hungary) Tamás Báló	DF	16		4						16		4	
8	(Hungary) Tamás Kecskés	MF	26		4	2	2				28		4	2
9	(Hungary) János Hahn	MF	30	6	3		2	1			32	7	3	
10	(Hungary) Zsolt Haraszti	FW	24	3	3						24	3	3	
17	(Hungary) Dénes Szakály	MF	24	4	3		2		1		26	4	4	
19	(Hungary) Barna Kesztyűs	MF	3				2				5			
20	(Hungary) Péter Zachán	DF	12				1		1		13		1	
21	(Hungary) Kristóf Papp	MF	31	1	7						31	1	7	
22	(Hungary) Áron Fejős	MF	2								2			
23	(Hungary) Tamás Szekszárdi	MF												
25	(Hungary) György Székely	GK	2				2				4			
26	(Hungary) Lajos Bertus	MF	32	2	1		2				34	2	1	
27	(Hungary) Róbert Kővári	MF	1								1			
29	(Hungary) Tamás Koltai	MF	26	3	1		2				28	3	1	
30	(Hungary) János Szabó	DF	19	3	3	1	2				21	3	3	1
31	(Hungary) Gergő Rácz	GK												
38	(Hungary) Ádám Hajdú	DF	11	1	1						11	1	1	
39	(Hungary) László Bartha	MF	27	11		1	1				28	11		1
40	(Hungary) András Szalai	DF	5		1		2				7		1	
70	(Hungary) Richárd Vernes	MF	16	1	4		1				17	1	4	
71	(Hungary) Szabolcs Kemenes	GK	16		1						16		1	
77	(Hungary) Dávid Kulcsár	DF	30	3	8	1	1				31	3	8	1
86	(Hungary) Zsolt Laczkó	MF	11		3		1				12		3	
92	(Hungary) Zsolt Balázs	FW	1		1						1		1	
94	(Hungary) Bence Daru	FW	4								4			
96	(Hungary) Bence Lenzsér	DF	24	1	8		1		1		25	1	9	
98	(Hungary) Richárd Jelena	FW	14				2				16			
Own goals								1				1		
Totals				41	69	5		3	3			44	72	5

=== Clean sheets ===
			Clean sheets		
No.	Player	Games Played	Nemzeti Bajnokság I	Magyar Kupa	Total
1	(Slovakia) Péter Molnár	15	6		6
71	(Hungary) Szabolcs Kemenes	16	3		3
25	(Hungary) György Székely	4		1	1
31	(Hungary) Gergő Rácz				
Totals			9	1	10
