= 2019–20 Paksi FC season =

Paks
2019–20 season
- Chairman: János Süli
- Manager: Tomislav Sivić (until 2 November); Gábor Osztermájer
- Stadium: Fehérvári úti Stadion
- Nemzeti Bajnokság I: 10th
- Hungarian Cup: Quarter-finals
- Top goalscorer: League: Norbert Könyves (11); All: Norbert Könyves (12)
- Highest home attendance: 2,680 vs Ferencváros (14 September 2020)
- Lowest home attendance: 600 vs Kaposvár (17 June 2020)
Home colours	Away colours

The 2019–20 season was Paksi Football Club's 14th competitive season, 14th consecutive season in the Nemzeti Bajnokság I and 67th year in existence as a football club. In addition to the domestic league, Paks participated in this season's editions of the Hungarian Cup.

== First team squad ==
As of 5 September 2019

Note: Flags indicate national team as defined under FIFA eligibility rules; some limited exceptions apply. Players may hold more than one non-FIFA nationality.

No.	Pos.	Nation	Player
5	DF	HUN	Zsolt Gévay (captain)
7	DF	HUN	Tamás Báló
8	MF	HUN	Tamás Kecskés
9	FW	HUN	János Hahn
10	FW	HUN	Zsolt Haraszti
11	DF	HUN	Attila Osváth
13	FW	HUN	Dániel Böde
14	DF	HUN	András Fejes
16	FW	HUN	Mohamed Remili
18	MF	HUN	Balázs Balogh
19	GK	HUN	Ádám Holczer

No.	Pos.	Nation	Player
21	MF	HUN	Kristóf Papp
22	MF	HUN	József Windecker
28	MF	HUN	László Zsidai
30	DF	HUN	János Szabó
31	GK	HUN	Gergő Rácz
32	DF	HUN	Dávid Kelemen
39	MF	HUN	László Bartha
42	FW	HUN	Norbert Könyves
46	MF	HUN	Ádám Simon
77	DF	HUN	Dávid Kulcsár
88	MF	HUN	Áron Fejős
96	DF	HUN	Bence Lenzsér

== Transfers ==
=== Summer ===
In: Note: Flags indicate national team as defined under FIFA eligibility rules; some limited exceptions apply. Players may hold more than one non-FIFA nationality.

No.	Pos.	Nation	Player
11	DF	HUN	Attila Osváth (from Puskás Akadémia)
11	FW	HUN	Márk Simon (loan return from Csákvár)
13	FW	HUN	Dániel Böde (from Ferencváros)
14	MF	HUN	Dávid Bor (loan return from Soroksár)
15	FW	HUN	Péter Horváth (loan return from Siófok)
18	MF	HUN	Balázs Balogh (from Puskás Akadémia)
19	GK	HUN	Ádám Holczer (from Ferencváros)
22	MF	HUN	Áron Fejős (loan return from Budaörs)
32	DF	HUN	Dávid Kelemen (loan return from Vasas)
87	GK	HUN	István Verpecz (loan return from Balmazújváros)
88	GK	HUN	Vilmos Borsos (loan return from Budaörs)
98	FW	HUN	Richárd Jelena (loan return from Mosonmagyaróvár)
—	DF	HUN	Patrik Poór (from Puskás Akadémia)
—	FW	HUN	Ákos Szendrei (from Paks U-17)

Out: Note: Flags indicate national team as defined under FIFA eligibility rules; some limited exceptions apply. Players may hold more than one non-FIFA nationality.

No.	Pos.	Nation	Player
1	GK	HUN	Gergely Nagy
2	DF	HUN	Dávid Bobál (to Zalaegerszeg)
6	MF	HUN	Benjámin Cseke (loan to MTK Budapest)
11	FW	HUN	Márk Simon (loan to Győr)
12	MF	HUN	Richárd Nagy (loan to Veszprém)
15	FW	HUN	Péter Horváth (to Siófok)
19	MF	HUN	Barna Kesztyűs (loan to Budapest Honvéd)
20	DF	HUN	Péter Zachán (loan to Veszprém)
23	DF	HUN	András Vági (to Diósgyőr)
25	DF	HUN	Máté Berdó (to Kozármisleny)
27	MF	HUN	Róbert Kővári (loan to Siófok)
40	DF	HUN	András Szalai (loan to (Slovakia) Komárno)
87	GK	HUN	István Verpecz
88	GK	HUN	Vilmos Borsos (loan to Dorog)
90	FW	HUN	András Simon (to MTK Budapest)
98	FW	HUN	Richárd Jelena (to Kozármisleny)
—	GK	HUN	Balázs Szabó (to Budaörs)

=== Winter ===
In: Note: Flags indicate national team as defined under FIFA eligibility rules; some limited exceptions apply. Players may hold more than one non-FIFA nationality.

No.	Pos.	Nation	Player
6	DF	HUN	Norbert Szélpál (from Békéscsaba)
6	MF	HUN	Benjámin Cseke (loan return from MTK Budapest)
11	FW	HUN	Márk Simon (loan return from Győr)
17	MF	HUN	Tamás Egerszegi (loan return from Budapest Honvéd)
20	FW	HUN	Máté Sajbán (loan from Mezőkövesd)
26	MF	HUN	Lajos Bertus (from Mezőkövesd)
71	MF	HUN	Dénes Szakály (from Siófok)

Out: Note: Flags indicate national team as defined under FIFA eligibility rules; some limited exceptions apply. Players may hold more than one non-FIFA nationality.

No.	Pos.	Nation	Player
6	MF	HUN	Benjámin Cseke (to MTK Budapest)
11	FW	HUN	Márk Simon (loan to Tiszakécske)
14	DF	HUN	András Fejes (to Győr)
16	MF	HUN	Mohamed Remili (to Siófok)
17	MF	HUN	Tamás Egerszegi (loan to Diósgyőr)
46	MF	HUN	Ádám Simon (to Győr)

== Competitions ==
=== Overview ===
Competition	First match	Last match	Starting round	Final position	Record							
Competition	First match	Last match	Starting round	Final position	Pld	W	D	L	GF	GA	GD	Win %
Nemzeti Bajnokság I	3 August 2019	–	Matchday 1	Matchday 33	15	4	2	9	19	29	−10	26.67
Magyar Kupa	22 September 2019	-	Sixth round		2	2	0	0	12	1	+11	100.00
Total					17	6	2	9	31	30	+1	35.29

Last updated: 14 December 2019
Source: Competitions

=== Nemzeti Bajnokság I ===
==== League table ====
Pos	Team	Pld	W	D	L	GF	GA	GD	Pts	Qualification or relegation
8	Kisvárda	33	12	6	15	42	43	−1	42	
9	Diósgyőr	33	12	5	16	40	52	−12	41	
10	Paks	33	11	8	14	46	53	−7	41	
11	Debrecen (R)	33	11	6	16	48	57	−9	39	Relegation to the Nemzeti Bajnokság II
12	Kaposvár (R)	33	4	2	27	27	80	−53	14	Relegation to the Nemzeti Bajnokság II

Source: Hungarian Football Federation (in Hungarian), Soccerway
Rules for classification: 1) Points; 2) Matches won; 3) Goal difference; 4) Goals scored; 5) Head-to-head points; 6) Head-to-head goal difference; 7) Head-to-head away goals scored; 8) Fair play ranking; 9) Drawing of lots.
(R) Relegated

==== Results summary ====
Overall								Home						Away					
Pld	W	D	L	GF	GA	GD	Pts	W	D	L	GF	GA	GD	W	D	L	GF	GA	GD
33	11	8	14	46	53	−7	41	7	4	5	25	23	+2	4	4	9	21	30	−9

Last updated: 27 June 2020.
Source: NB1

==== Results by round ====
Round	1	2	3	4	5	6	7	8	9	10	11	12	13	14	15	16	17	18	19	20	21	22	23	24	25	26	27	28	29	30	31	32	33
Ground	A	H	A	H	A	H	A	H	A	H	A	H	A	H	A	H	A	H	A	H	A	H	A	H	A	H	A	H	A	H	A	H	A
Result	L	W	D	L	W	L	L	W	L	L	L	D	L	L	W	W	L	W	W	L	L	W	L	D	D	D	W	D	D	W	L	W	D
Position	9	5	6	7	7	8	9	7	9	9	10	10	10	10	10	10	10	10	9	10	10	9	10	10	10	11	10	10	10	9	10	9	10

Updated to match(es) played on 27 June 2020. Source: Matches
A = Away; H = Home; W = Win; D = Draw; L = Loss

==== Matches ====
3 August 2019 1	Kisvárda	1 – 0	Paks	Kisvárda
19:30 CEST	Grozav 79'	Report		Stadium: Várkerti Stadion; Attendance: 2,128; Referee: Gergő Bogár

11 August 2019 2	Paks	3 – 1	Budapest Honvéd	Paks
18:00 CEST	Remili 35'; Hahn 46', 63'	Report	Moutari 76'	Stadium: Fehérvári úti Stadion; Attendance: 2,311; Referee: Ferenc Karakó

17 August 2019 3	Újpest	1 – 1	Paks	Budapest
19:30 CEST	Sanković 69'	Report	Könyves 57'	Stadium: Illovszky Rudolf Stadion; Attendance: 2,349; Referee: Péter Solymosi

24 August 2019 4	Paks	0 – 2	Fehérvár	Paks
18:00 CEST		Report	Futács 24'; Petryak 61'	Stadium: Fehérvári úti Stadion; Attendance: 2,098; Referee: Bence Csonka

31 August 2019 5	Mezőkövesd	0 – 2	Paks	Mezőkövesd
19:30 CEST		Report	Hahn 22' (pen.), 50'	Stadium: Városi Stadion; Attendance: 2,362; Referee: Csaba Pintér

14 September 2019 6	Paks	0 – 4	Ferencváros	Paks
19:30 CEST		Report	Zubkov 33'; Nguen 36'; Varga 45' (pen.), 83'	Stadium: Fehérvári úti Stadion; Attendance: 2,680; Referee: Csaba Pintér

28 September 2019 7	Zalaegerszeg	3 – 1	Paks	Zalaegerszeg
17:00 CEST	Radó 27'; Stieber 36'; Mitrović 71'	Report	Böde 9'	Stadium: ZTE Arena; Attendance: 2,945; Referee: József Erdős

5 October 2019 8	Paks	2 – 1	Kaposvár	Paks
17:00 CEST	Remili 47'; Windecker 56'	Report	Hegedűs 35'	Stadium: Fehérvári úti Stadion; Attendance: 1,109; Referee: Gergő Bogár

19 October 2019 9	Puskás Akadémia	4 – 2	Paks	Felcsút
17:00 CEST	Vaněček 21'; Urblík 27'; Gyurcsó 50', 76'	Report	Könyves 19'; Papp 59'	Stadium: Pancho Aréna; Attendance: 1,141; Referee: Ferenc Karakó

26 October 2019 10	Paks	1 – 2	Diósgyőr	Paks
17:00 CEST	Könyves 59'	Report	Ivanovski 14'; Iszlai 64' (pen.)	Stadium: Fehérvári úti Stadion; Attendance: 1,397; Referee: Viktor Kassai

2 November 2019 11	Debrecen	3 – 1	Paks	Debrecen
17:00 CET	Szécsi 28'; Kusnyír 32'; Kundrák 60'	Report	Böde 81'	Stadium: Nagyerdei Stadion; Attendance: 2,650; Referee: Bence Csonka

9 November 2019 12	Paks	1 – 1	Kisvárda	Paks
17:00 CET	Szabó 90+1'	Report	Lucas 88'	Stadium: Fehérvári úti Stadion; Attendance: 1,210; Referee: József Erdős

23 November 2019 13	Budapest Honvéd	2 – 1	Paks	Budapest
17:00 CET	Lanzafame 76' (pen.); Aliji 83'	Report	Böde 72'	Stadium: Hidegkuti Nándor Stadion; Attendance: 2,365; Referee: Ádám Pillók

30 November 2019 14	Paks	2 – 4	Újpest	Paks
17:00 CET	Hahn 62'; Bor 85'	Report	Feczesin 21', 51'; Zsótér 61'; Pauljević 77'	Stadium: Fehérvári úti Stadion; Attendance: 1,315; Referee: Ferenc Karakó

7 December 2019 15	Fehérvár	0 – 2	Paks	Székesfehérvár
17:00 CET		Report	Szabó 54'; Könyves 78'	Stadium: MOL Aréna Sóstó; Attendance: 2,019; Referee: József Erdős

14 December 2019 16	Paks	1 – 0	Mezőkövesd	Paks
17:00 CET	Windecker 11'	Report		Stadium: Fehérvári úti Stadion; Attendance: 1,110; Referee: Csaba Pintér

25 January 2020 17	Ferencváros	4 – 0	Paks	Budapest
14:55 CET	Zubkov 3', 65'; Boli 43'; Isael 51'	Report		Stadium: Groupama Arena; Attendance: 8,075; Referee: Zoltán Iványi

1 February 2020 18	Paks	2 – 0	Zalaegerszeg	Paks
17:00 CET	Kelemen 25'; Böde 78'	Report		Stadium: Fehérvári úti Stadion; Attendance: 1,119; Referee: Tamás Bognár

5 February 2020 19	Kaposvár	0 – 3	Paks	Kaposvár
18:00 CET		Report	Könyves 17', 41'; Sajbán 83'	Stadium: Rákóczi Stadion; Attendance: 690; Referee: Ferenc Karakó

8 February 2020 20	Paks	0 – 2	Puskás Akadémia	Paks
17:00 CET		Report	Favorov 12'; Vaněček 90'	Stadium: Fehérvári úti Stadion; Attendance: 1,106; Referee: Csaba Pintér

15 February 2020 21	Diósgyőr	2 – 0	Paks	Miskolc
17:00 CET	Ivanovski 28'; Hasani 78'	Report		Stadium: DVTK Stadion; Attendance: 3,245; Referee: István Vad

22 February 2020 22	Paks	4 – 2	Debrecen	Paks
17:00 CET	Kulcsár 26'; Böde 32'; Sajbán 87'; Windecker 90+2'	Report	Szécsi 5'; Garba 65'	Stadium: Fehérvári úti Stadion; Attendance: 1,221; Referee: Balázs Berke

29 February 2020 23	Kisvárda	2 – 0	Paks	Kisvárda
17:00 CET	Sassá 74'; Bumba 82'	Report		Stadium: Várkerti Stadion; Attendance: 2,002; Referee: Sándor Andó-Szabó

7 March 2020 24	Paks	0 – 0	Budapest Honvéd	Paks
17:00 CET		Report		Stadium: Fehérvári úti Stadion; Attendance: 1,379; Referee: Péter Solymosi

14 March 2020 25	Újpest	1 – 1	Paks	Zalaegerszeg
17:00 CET	Litauszki 57'	Report	Könyves 90+4'	Stadium: ZTE Arena; Attendance: x Referee: Ádám Pillók

30 May 2020 26	Paks	0 – 0	Fehérvár	Paks
21:05 CEST		Report		Stadium: Fehérvári úti Stadion; Attendance: 700; Referee: Gergő Bogár

6 June 2020 27	Mezőkövesd	0 – 2	Paks	Mezőkövesd
16:55 CEST		Report	Könyves 50', 64'	Stadium: Városi Stadion; Attendance: 784; Referee: Péter Solymosi

10 June 2020 28	Paks	2 – 2	Ferencváros	Paks
21:05 CEST	Windecker 90+2' (pen.); Sajbán 90+6'	Report	Blažič 56'; Kharatin 81'	Stadium: Fehérvári úti Stadion; Attendance: 700; Referee: Tamás Bognár

13 June 2020 29	Zalaegerszeg	3 – 3	Paks	Zalaegerszeg
21:05 CEST	Bobál 34', 71'; Szélpál 50' (o.g.)	Report	Könyves 12'; Böde 79' (pen.); Balogh 90+2'	Stadium: ZTE Arena; Attendance: 2,644; Referee: Sándor Andó-Szabó

17 June 2020 30	Paks	3 – 0	Kaposvár	Paks
16:55 CEST	Hahn 21' (pen.); Haraszti 33', 69' (pen.)	Report		Stadium: Fehérvári úti Stadion; Attendance: 600; Referee: Péter Solymosi

20 June 2020 31	Puskás Akadémia	3 – 1	Paks	Felcsút
19:00 CEST	Vaněček 4', 89'; Knežević 43'	Report	Sajbán 55'	Stadium: Pancho Aréna; Attendance: 800; Referee: Balázs Berke

24 June 2020 32	Paks	4 – 2	Diósgyőr	Paks
21:05 CEST	Windecker 17', 74'; Gévay 49'; Hahn 56'	Report	Iszlai 60' (pen.); Molnár 90'	Stadium: Fehérvári úti Stadion; Attendance: 1,891; Referee: Gergő Bogár

27 June 2020 33	Debrecen	1 – 1	Paks	Debrecen
17:30 CEST	Szélpál 74' (o.g.)	Report	Könyves 17'	Stadium: Nagyerdei Stadion; Attendance: 9,400; Referee: Balázs Berke

=== Hungarian Cup ===
21 September 2019 6th round	Putnok	0 – 5	Paks	Putnok
15:00 CEST		Report	Hahn 17' (pen.), 22'; Poór 26', 86'; Balogh 30'	Stadium: Várady Béla Sportközpont; Attendance: 400; Referee: Ádám Németh

30 October 2019 7th round	Salgótarján	1 – 7	Paks	Salgótarján
12:30 CET	Gazdag 50'	Report	Böde 12', 65', 75'; Windecker 36'; Balogh 56'; Bor 85'; Poór 90'	Stadium: Szojka Ferenc Stadion; Attendance: 700; Referee: Márk Szigetvári

4 December 2019 8th round	Mosonmagyaróvár	0 – 4	Paks	Mosonmagyaróvár
12:00 CET		Report	Kecskés 5'; Böde 8'; Báló 13'; Könyves 23'	Stadium: MTE Sporttelep; Attendance: 300; Referee: Gergely Szőts

12 February 2020 Round of 16 (1st leg)	Pécs	1 – 2	Paks	Pécs
14:00 CET	Rácz 38'	Report	Kecskés 55'; Sajbán 57'	Stadium: Stadion PMFC; Attendance: 1,800; Referee: Péter Antal

19 February 2020 Round of 16 (2nd leg)	Paks	1 – 0 (3 – 1 agg.)	Pécs	Paks
18:00 CET	Hahn 57' (pen.)	Report		Stadium: Fehérvári úti Stadion; Attendance: 1,198; Referee: Márton Rúsz

4 March 2020 Quarter-final (1st leg)	Paks	0 – 0	Budapest Honvéd	Paks
18:00 CET		Report		Stadium: Fehérvári úti Stadion; Attendance: 1,031; Referee: Zoltán Iványi

11 March 2020 Quarter-final (2nd leg)	Budapest Honvéd	2 – 0 (2 – 0 agg.)	Paks	Szeged
18:00 CET	Gazdag 45'; Kamber 78'	Report		Stadium: Szent Gellért Fórum; Attendance: 880; Referee: Ferenc Karakó

== Statistics ==
=== Appearances and goals ===
Last updated on 27 June 2020.

No.	Pos	Nat	Player	Total		OTP Bank Liga		Hungarian Cup	
No.	Pos	Nat	Player	Apps	Goals	Apps	Goals	Apps	Goals
5	DF	(Hungary) HUN	Zsolt Gévay	20	1	14	1	6	0
6	DF	(Hungary) HUN	Norbert Szélpál	16	0	14	0	2	0
7	DF	(Hungary) HUN	Tamás Báló	8	1	2	0	6	1
8	MF	(Hungary) HUN	Tamás Kecskés	24	2	18	0	6	2
9	FW	(Hungary) HUN	János Hahn	34	10	30	7	4	3
10	MF	(Hungary) HUN	Zsolt Haraszti	13	2	10	2	3	0
11	DF	(Hungary) HUN	Attila Osváth	34	0	28	0	6	0
13	FW	(Hungary) HUN	Dániel Böde	31	10	27	6	4	4
17	MF	(Hungary) HUN	Dávid Bor	8	2	2	1	6	1
18	MF	(Hungary) HUN	Balázs Balogh	33	3	30	1	3	2
19	GK	(Hungary) HUN	Ádám Holczer	16	-24	12	-21	4	-3
20	FW	(Hungary) HUN	Máté Sajbán	17	5	13	4	4	1
21	MF	(Hungary) HUN	Kristóf Papp	16	1	14	1	2	0
22	MF	(Hungary) HUN	József Windecker	32	7	26	6	6	1
23	FW	(Hungary) HUN	Ákos Szendrei	5	0	3	0	2	0
24	DF	(Hungary) HUN	Patrik Poór	20	3	15	0	5	3
26	MF	(Hungary) HUN	Lajos Bertus	17	0	15	0	2	0
27	MF	(Hungary) HUN	Róbert Kővári	1	0	1	0	0	0
30	DF	(Hungary) HUN	János Szabó	34	2	32	2	2	0
31	GK	(Hungary) HUN	Gergő Rácz	24	-33	21	-32	3	-1
32	DF	(Hungary) HUN	Dávid Kelemen	13	1	10	1	3	0
39	MF	(Hungary) HUN	László Bartha	11	0	11	0	0	0
42	FW	(Hungary) HUN	Norbert Könyves	34	12	28	11	6	1
71	MF	(Hungary) HUN	Dénes Szakály	18	0	16	0	2	0
77	MF	(Hungary) HUN	Dávid Kulcsár	19	1	17	1	2	0
88	MF	(Hungary) HUN	Áron Fejős	11	0	8	0	3	0
92	GK	(Hungary) HUN	Norbert Csernyánszki	0	0	0	0	0	0
96	DF	(Hungary) HUN	Bence Lenzsér	25	0	21	0	4	0
Youth players:
1	GK	(Hungary) HUN	Flórián Kovács	0	0	0	0	0	0
Players no longer at the club:
6	MF	(Hungary) HUN	Benjámin Cseke	2	0	2	0	0	0
14	DF	(Hungary) HUN	András Fejes	14	0	12	0	2	0
16	MF	(Hungary) HUN	Mohamed Remili	13	2	12	2	1	0
46	MF	(Hungary) HUN	Ádám Simon	9	0	9	0	0	0

=== Top scorers ===
Includes all competitive matches. The list is sorted by shirt number when total goals are equal.

Last updated on 27 June 2020

Position	Nation	Number	Name	OTP Bank Liga	Hungarian Cup	Total
1	(Hungary)	42	Norbert Könyves	11	1	12
2	(Hungary)	9	János Hahn	7	3	10
3	(Hungary)	13	Dániel Böde	6	4	10
4	(Hungary)	22	József Windecker	6	1	7
5	(Hungary)	20	Máté Sajbán	4	1	5
6	(Hungary)	18	Balázs Balogh	1	2	3
7	(Hungary)	24	Patrik Poór	0	3	3
8	(Hungary)	16	Mohamed Remili	2	0	2
9	(Hungary)	30	János Szabó	2	0	2
10	(Hungary)	10	Zsolt Haraszti	2	0	2
11	(Hungary)	17	Dávid Bor	1	1	2
12	(Hungary)	8	Tamás Kecskés	0	2	2
13	(Hungary)	21	Kristóf Papp	1	0	1
14	(Hungary)	32	Dávid Kelemen	1	0	1
15	(Hungary)	77	Dávid Kulcsár	1	0	1
16	(Hungary)	5	Zsolt Gévay	1	0	1
17	(Hungary)	7	Tamás Báló	0	1	1
/	/	/	Own Goals	0	0	0
			TOTALS	46	19	65

=== Disciplinary record ===
Includes all competitive matches. Players with 1 card or more included only.

Last updated on 27 June 2020

Position	Nation	Number	Name	OTP Bank Liga		Hungarian Cup		Total (Hu Total)	
Position	Nation	Number	Name	Booked	Sent off (straight red)	Booked	Sent off (straight red)	Booked	Sent off (straight red)
DF	(Hungary)	5	Zsolt Gévay	4	1	2	0	6 (4)	1 (1)
DF	(Hungary)	6	Norbert Szélpál	3	0	0	0	3 (3)	0 (0)
DF	(Hungary)	7	Tamás Báló	0	0	1	0	1 (0)	0 (0)
MF	(Hungary)	8	Tamás Kecskés	2	0	0	0	2 (2)	0 (0)
FW	(Hungary)	9	János Hahn	2	0	0	0	2 (2)	0 (0)
MF	(Hungary)	10	Zsolt Haraszti	2	0	2	0	4 (2)	0 (0)
DF	(Hungary)	11	Attila Osváth	8	0	1	0	9 (8)	0 (0)
FW	(Hungary)	13	Dániel Böde	3	2	0	0	3 (3)	2 (2)
DF	(Hungary)	14	András Fejes	2	1	0	0	2 (2)	1 (1)
MF	(Hungary)	16	Mohamed Remili	2	0	0	0	2 (2)	0 (0)
MF	(Hungary)	17	Dávid Bor	0	0	2	0	2 (0)	0 (0)
MF	(Hungary)	18	Balázs Balogh	6	0	1	0	7 (6)	0 (0)
GK	(Hungary)	19	Ádám Holczer	1	0	0	0	1 (1)	0 (0)
MF	(Hungary)	21	Kristóf Papp	4	1	0	0	4 (4)	1 (1)
MF	(Hungary)	22	József Windecker	5	0	1	0	6 (5)	0 (0)
DF	(Hungary)	24	Patrik Poór	3	0	0	0	3 (3)	0 (0)
MF	(Hungary)	26	Lajos Bertus	1	0	0	0	1 (1)	0 (0)
MF	(Hungary)	27	Róbert Kővári	1	0	0	0	1 (1)	0 (0)
DF	(Hungary)	30	János Szabó	7	0	0	0	7 (7)	0 (0)
GK	(Hungary)	31	Gergő Rácz	3	0	0	0	3 (3)	0 (0)
DF	(Hungary)	32	Dávid Kelemen	2	0	1	0	3 (2)	0 (0)
MF	(Hungary)	39	László Bartha	1	0	0	0	1 (1)	0 (0)
FW	(Hungary)	42	Norbert Könyves	8	1	2	0	10 (8)	1 (1)
MF	(Hungary)	46	Ádám Simon	4	0	0	0	4 (4)	0 (0)
MF	(Hungary)	71	Dénes Szakály	1	0	0	0	1 (1)	0 (0)
MF	(Hungary)	77	Dávid Kulcsár	1	0	0	0	1 (1)	0 (0)
MF	(Hungary)	88	Áron Fejős	0	0	2	0	2 (0)	0 (0)
DF	(Hungary)	96	Bence Lenzsér	7	0	0	0	7 (7)	0 (0)
			TOTALS	83	6	15	0	98 (83)	6 (6)

=== Overall ===
Games played	40 (33 OTP Bank Liga and 7 Hungarian Cup)
Games won	16 (11 OTP Bank Liga and 5 Hungarian Cup)
Games drawn	9 (8 OTP Bank Liga and 1 Hungarian Cup)
Games lost	15 (14 OTP Bank Liga and 1 Hungarian Cup)
Goals scored	65
Goals conceded	57
Goal difference	+8
Yellow cards	98
Red cards	6
Worst discipline	(Hungary) Norbert Könyves (10 (yellow card) , 1 (red card) )
Best result	7–1 (A) v Salgótarján - Magyar Kupa - 21-09-2019
Worst result	0–4 (H) v Ferencváros - Nemzeti Bajnokság I - 14-09-2019
Worst result	0–4 (A) v Ferencváros - Nemzeti Bajnokság I - 25-01-2019
Most appearances	(Hungary) Norbert Könyves (34 appearances)
Most appearances	(Hungary) János Hahn (34 appearances)
Most appearances	(Hungary) Attila Osváth (34 appearances)
Most appearances	(Hungary) János Szabó (34 appearances)
Top scorer	(Hungary) Norbert Könyves (12 goals)
Points	57/120 (47.5%)

Last updated: 27 June 2020
