= 2020–21 Paksi FC season =

Paks
2020–21 season
- Chairman: János Süli
- Manager: Gábor Osztermájer (until 20 September 2020); György Bognár
- Stadium: Fehérvári úti Stadion, Paks, Hungary
Home colours	Away colours	Third colours

The 2020–21 season was Paksi Football Club's 15th competitive season, 15th consecutive season in the Nemzeti Bajnokság I and 68th year in existence as a football club. In addition to the domestic league, Paks participated in this season's editions of the Hungarian Cup.

== Transfers ==
=== Summer ===
In: Note: Flags indicate national team as defined under FIFA eligibility rules; some limited exceptions apply. Players may hold more than one non-FIFA nationality.

No.	Pos.	Nation	Player
1	GK	HUN	Lajos Hegedűs (from Puskás Akadémia)
4	DF	HUN	Márton Lorentz (from Siófok)
14	MF	HUN	István Bognár (from MTK Budapest)
16	FW	HUN	Martin Ádám (from Kaposvár)
18	MF	HUN	Zoltán Sipos (from Puskás Akadémia II)
20	FW	HUN	Máté Sajbán (from Mezőkövesd)
27	MF	HUN	Róbert Kővári (loan return from Siófok)
28	MF	HUN	Richárd Nagy (from Kaposvár)
29	MF	HUN	Richárd Csősz (loan from Debrecen)
—	DF	HUN	Dávid Forgács (from Nyíregyháza)
—	MF	HUN	Bálint Szabó (from Fehérvár II)
—	MF	HUN	Barna Kesztyűs (loan return from Budapest Honvéd)
—	GK	HUN	Vilmos Borsos (loan return from Dorog)
—	DF	HUN	Péter Zachán (loan return from Veszprém)
—	MF	HUN	Richárd Nagy (loan return from Veszprém)
—	MF	HUN	Tamás Egerszegi (loan return from Diósgyőr)
—	FW	HUN	Márk Simon (loan return from Tiszakécske)

Out: Note: Flags indicate national team as defined under FIFA eligibility rules; some limited exceptions apply. Players may hold more than one non-FIFA nationality.

No.	Pos.	Nation	Player
7	DF	HUN	Tamás Báló (to Dunaújváros)
8	MF	HUN	Tamás Kecskés (to Siófok)
12	MF	HUN	Richárd Nagy (to Veszprém)
17	MF	HUN	Dávid Bor (to (Romania) Csíkszereda)
17	MF	HUN	Tamás Egerszegi
19	MF	HUN	Barna Kesztyűs (to Budapest Honvéd)
20	DF	HUN	Péter Zachán (to (Iceland) Fjölnir)
24	DF	HUN	Patrik Poór (to Debrecen)
32	DF	HUN	Dávid Kelemen (loan to Szombathelyi Haladás)
39	FW	HUN	László Bartha (to Pécs)
42	FW	HUN	Norbert Könyves (to Zalaegerszeg)
—	MF	HUN	Bálint Szabó (loan to Kaposvár)
—	DF	HUN	Dávid Forgács (loan to Szentlőrinc)
—	FW	HUN	Márk Simon (to Tiszakécske)

=== Winter ===
In: Note: Flags indicate national team as defined under FIFA eligibility rules; some limited exceptions apply. Players may hold more than one non-FIFA nationality.

No.	Pos.	Nation	Player
—	DF	HUN	András Vági (from Diósgyőr)
—	DF	HUN	Olivér Tamás (loan from Fehérvár)
—	MF	HUN	Bálint Szabó (loan return from Kaposvár)
—	MF	HUN	Dávid Bognár (from Paks II)

Out: Note: Flags indicate national team as defined under FIFA eligibility rules; some limited exceptions apply. Players may hold more than one non-FIFA nationality.

No.	Pos.	Nation	Player
—	GK	HUN	Vilmos Borsos (loan to Dorog)
18	MF	HUN	Zoltán Sipos (loan to Győr)
27	MF	HUN	Róbert Kővári (to Szeged)
29	MF	HUN	Richárd Csősz (loan return to Debrecen)

=== Nemzeti Bajnokság I ===
==== League table ====
Pos	Team	Pld	W	D	L	GF	GA	GD	Pts	Qualification or relegation
2	Puskás Akadémia	33	18	4	11	52	42	+10	58	Qualification for the Europa Conference League first qualifying round
3	Fehérvár	33	16	8	9	68	38	+30	56	Qualification for the Europa Conference League first qualifying round
4	Paks	33	14	8	11	76	64	+12	50	
5	Kisvárda	33	12	10	11	30	36	−6	46	
6	Újpest	33	12	6	15	46	67	−21	42	Qualification for the Europa Conference League second qualifying round (Note: Újpest qualified for the Europa Conference League second qualifying round as the 2020–21 Magyar Kupa winners.)

Source: Hungarian Football Federation (in Hungarian), Soccerway
Rules for classification: 1) Points; 2) Matches won; 3) Goal difference; 4) Goals scored; 5) Head-to-head points; 6) Head-to-head goal difference; 7) Head-to-head away goals scored; 8) Fair play ranking; 9) Drawing of lots.

==== Results summary ====
Overall								Home						Away					
Pld	W	D	L	GF	GA	GD	Pts	W	D	L	GF	GA	GD	W	D	L	GF	GA	GD
33	14	8	11	76	64	+12	50	10	3	4	39	21	+18	4	5	7	37	43	−6

Last updated: 9 May 2021.
Source: NB1

==== Results by round ====
Round	1	2	3	4	5	6	7	8	9	10	11	12	13	14	15	16	17	18	19	20	21	22	23	24	25	26	27	28	29	30	31	32	33
Ground	H	A	H	A	H	A	H	H	A	H	A	A	H	A	H	A	H	A	A	H	A	H	H	A	H	A	H	A	H	H	A	H	A
Result	L	D	L	L	W	W	W	D	W	W	L	D	W	L	L	L	W	D	D	W	L	W	L	D	D	L	W	W	D	W	W	W	L
Position	12	10	11	12	9	7	3	4	3	2	5	5	3	6	6	6	5	6	6	4	6	5	5	6	6	7	6	4	4	4	4	4	4

Updated to match(es) played on 9 May 2021. Source: Matches
A = Away; H = Home; W = Win; D = Draw; L = Loss

==== Matches ====
15 August 2020 1	Paks	1 – 2	Újpest	Paks
16:30 CEST	Ádám 76'	Report	Simon 16', 62'	Stadium: Stadion PSE; Attendance: 3,870; Referee: Ádám Farkas

22 August 2020 2	Fehérvár	1 – 1	Paks	Székesfehérvár
21:00 CEST	Hodžić 90+2'	Report	Szélpál 80'	Stadium: MOL Aréna Sóstó; Attendance: 3,231; Referee: Ferenc Karakó

29 August 2020 3	Paks	1 – 2	Mezőkövesd	Paks
20:30 CEST	Böde 65'	Report	Berecz 17'; Cseri 37'	Stadium: Stadion PSE; Attendance: 1,398; Referee: Mihály Káprály

11 September 2020 4	Ferencváros	5 – 0	Paks	Budapest
20:00 CEST	Nguen 1', 20', 28'; Boli 47', 90+2'	Report		Stadium: Groupama Arena; Attendance: 7,021; Referee: Sándor Andó-Szabó

26 September 2020 5	Paks	4 – 0	MTK Budapest	Paks
14:45 CEST	Hahn 38' (pen.), 57' (pen.), 81'; Szakály 53'	Report		Stadium: Stadion PSE; Attendance: 1,398; Referee: József Erdős

3 October 2020 6	Diósgyőr	1 – 2	Paks	Miskolc
19:30 CEST	Molnár 49'	Report	Windecker 46'; Szakály 90+1'	Stadium: DVTK Stadion; Attendance: 3,052; Referee: Gergő Bogár

18 October 2020 7	Paks	3 – 1	Zalaegerszeg	Paks
14:30 CEST	Balogh 47'; Gévay 48'; Hahn 75'	Report	Könyves 25'	Stadium: Fehérvári úti Stadion; Attendance: 1,602; Referee: Péter Solymosi

24 October 2020 8	Paks	0 – 0	Budapest Honvéd	Paks
17:00 CEST		Report		Stadium: Fehérvári úti Stadion; Attendance: 1,701; Referee: Ádám Farkas

1 November 2020 9	Budafok	2 – 3	Paks	Budapest
14:05 CET	Ihrig-Farkas 7'; Kovács 27' (pen.)	Report	Sajbán 15'; Hahn 29'; Bognár 42'	Stadium: Promontor utcai Stadion; Attendance: 1,250; Referee: József Erdős

7 November 2020 10	Paks	6 – 2	Puskás	Paks
14:45 CET	Hahn 12', 15', 19', 49'; Bognár 52'; Ádám 82'	Report	Băluță 27'; Mance 85'	Stadium: Fehérvári úti Stadion; Attendance: 1,089; Referee: Péter Antal

20 November 2020 11	Kisvárda	3 – 1	Paks	Kisvárda
20:30 CET	Bumba 16'; Navrátil 44'; Jelena 86'	Report	Rubus 30' (o.g.)	Stadium: Várkerti Stadion; Attendance: x Referee: Mihály Káprály
Note: COVID-19 pandemic in Hungary

27 November 2020 12	Újpest	1 – 1	Paks	Budapest
20:00 CET	Beridze 68'	Report	Ádám 90+1'	Stadium: Szusza Ferenc Stadion; Attendance: x Referee: Bence Csonka
Note: COVID-19 pandemic in Hungary

6 December 2020 13	Paks	1 – 0	Fehérvár	Paks
17:30 CET	Ádám 89'	Report		Stadium: Fehérvári úti Stadion; Attendance: x Referee: Péter Solymosi
Note: COVID-19 pandemic in Hungary

13 December 2020 14	Mezőkövesd	4 – 3	Paks	Mezőkövesd
14:30 CET	Karnitsky 20'; Beširović 39'; Vutov 52'; Pillár 79'	Report	Ádám 37' (pen.), 57'; Bognár 90+3'	Stadium: Városi Stadion; Attendance: x Referee: Tamás Bognár
Note: COVID-19 pandemic in Hungary

16 December 2020 15	Paks	1 – 3	Ferencváros	Paks
20:15 CET	Szabó 43'	Report	Frimpong 3'; Kharatin 50'; Isael 85'	Stadium: Fehérvári úti Stadion; Attendance: x Referee: Balázs Berke
Note: COVID-19 pandemic in Hungary

19 December 2020 16	MTK Budapest	3 – 1	Paks	Budapest
14:45 CET	Dimitrov 74'; Prosser 79'; Schön 90'	Report	Nagy 90+4'	Stadium: Hidegkuti Nándor Stadion; Attendance: x Referee: Ádám Farkas
Note: COVID-19 pandemic in Hungary

24 January 2021 17	Paks	2 – 1	Diósgyőr	Paks
15:45 CET	Papp 32'; Grozav 45' (o.g.)	Report	Ivanovski 70'	Stadium: Fehérvári úti Stadion; Attendance: x Referee: Ferenc Karakó
Note: COVID-19 pandemic in Hungary

31 January 2021 18	Zalaegerszeg	4 – 4	Paks	Zalaegerszeg
14:10 CET	Szépe 6'; Favorov 46'; Babati 78'; Könyves 83'	Report	Bognár 31', 74'; Hahn 38'; Papp 90+4'	Stadium: ZTE Arena; Attendance: x Referee: Csaba Pintér
Note: COVID-19 pandemic in Hungary

3 February 2021 19	Budapest Honvéd	1 – 1	Paks	Budapest
17:30 CET	Balogh 56'	Report	Ádám 49'	Stadium: Hidegkuti Nándor Stadion; Attendance: x Referee: Péter Antal
Note: COVID-19 pandemic in Hungary

7 February 2021 20	Paks	4 – 1	Budafok	Paks
14:10 CET	Jagodics 3' (o.g.); Szabó 19'; Hahn 55' (pen.); Szendrei 90+2'	Report	Takács 62'	Stadium: Fehérvári úti Stadion; Attendance: x Referee: Ádám Pillók
Note: COVID-19 pandemic in Hungary

13 February 2021 21	Puskás Akadémia	3 – 2	Paks	Felcsút
14:45 CET	Mance 21'; Kiss 24'; Plšek 81'	Report	Böde 68'; Hahn 75' (pen.)	Stadium: Pancho Aréna; Attendance: x Referee: Mihály Káprály
Note: COVID-19 pandemic in Hungary

21 February 2021 22	Paks	3 – 0	Kisvárda	Paks
17:45 CET	Hahn 4'; Bognár 46'; Nagy 84'	Report		Stadium: Fehérvári úti Stadion; Attendance: x Referee: Péter Solymosi

28 February 2021 23	Paks	1 – 3	Újpest	Paks
14:30 CET	Gévay 25'	Report	Antonov 47'; Beridze 60'; Szakály 90+2'	Stadium: Fehérvári úti Stadion; Attendance: x Referee: Sándor Andó-Szabó

3 March 2021 24	Fehérvár	2 – 2	Paks	Székesfehérvár
20:00 CET	Petryak 11'; Zivzivadze 64'	Report	Haraszti 78', 85'	Stadium: MOL Aréna Sóstó; Attendance: no spectators Referee: István Vad
Note: COVID-19 pandemic in Hungary

6 March 2021 25	Paks	2 – 2	Mezőkövesd	Paks
17:00 CET	Haraszti 75'; Sajbán 85'	Report	Vutov 28'; Beširović 76'	Stadium: Fehérvári úti Stadion; Attendance: x Referee: Csaba Pintér
Note: COVID-19 pandemic in Hungary

14 March 2021 26	Ferencváros	5 – 2	Paks	Budapest
17:00 CET	Laïdouni 22'; Uzuni 49' (pen.); Mak 62'; Boli 75'; Baturina 89'	Report	Hahn 2' (pen.); Szendrei 87'	Stadium: Groupama Arena; Attendance: x Referee: Ferenc Karakó
Note: COVID-19 pandemic in Hungary

3 April 2021 27	Paks	3 – 1	MTK Budapest	Paks
14:45 CEST	Pintér 25' (o.g.); Hahn 31', 75'	Report	Schön 56'	Stadium: Fehérvári úti Stadion; Attendance: x Referee: Gergő Bogár
Note: COVID-19 pandemic in Hungary

11 April 2021 28	Diósgyőr	1 – 4	Paks	Miskolc
14:30 CEST	Molnár 86'	Report	Hahn 10' (pen.), 16'; Sajbán 68'; Szakály 87'	Stadium: DVTK Stadion; Attendance: x Referee: Csaba Pintér

17 April 2021 29	Paks	1 – 1	Zalaegerszeg	Paks
19:30 CEST	Böde 50'	Report	Kálnoki-Kis 18'	Stadium: Fehérvári úti Stadion; Attendance: x Referee: István Vad
Note: COVID-19 pandemic in Hungary

21 April 2021 30	Paks	2 – 0	Budapest Honvéd	Paks
20:15 CEST	Hahn 34'; Balogh 39'	Report		Stadium: Fehérvári úti Stadion; Attendance: x Referee: Balázs Berke
Note: COVID-19 pandemic in Hungary

25 April 2021 31	Budafok	2 – 9	Paks	Budapest
14:30 CEST	Medgyes 15'; Takács 43'	Report	Nagy 17'; Papp 27'; Hahn 38', 55', 90+1'; Ádám 45'; Bognár 58', 73'; Szabó 71'	Stadium: Promontor utcai Stadion; Attendance: x Referee: Tamás Bognár
Note: COVID-19 pandemic in Hungary

30 April 2021 32	Paks	4 – 2	Puskás Akadémia	Paks
20:00 CEST	Böde 62'; Nunes 71' (o.g.); Bognár 76', 83'	Report	Komáromi 22'; J. Szabó 88' (o.g.)	Stadium: Fehérvári úti Stadion; Attendance: x Referee: Péter Zierkelbach
Note: COVID-19 pandemic in Hungary

9 May 2021 33	Kisvárda	5 – 1	Paks	Kisvárda
17:30 CEST	Viana 8'; Melnyk 13'; Ötvös 34'; Leoni 45'; Camaj 86'	Report	Haraszti 67' (pen.)	Stadium: Várkerti Stadion; Attendance: 1,850; Referee: Gergő Bogár
Note: COVID-19 pandemic in Hungary

=== Hungarian Cup ===
20 September 2020 Round 6	Hatvan	1 – 3	Paks	Hatvan
15:00 CEST	Karácsony 28'	Report	Szakály 11' (pen.); Haraszti 72', 80'	Stadium: Népkert Sporttelep; Attendance: 500; Referee: Gergely Szőts

29 October 2020 Round of 64	Nyíregyháza Spartacus	1 – 2 (a.e.t.)	Paks	Nyíregyháza
12:30 CET	Ötvös 75'	Report	Hahn 83', 109'	Stadium: Városi Stadion; Attendance: 400; Referee: László Lovas

10 February 2021 Round of 32	Csákvár	2 – 3	Paks	Csákvár
13:00 CET	Madarász 2'; Sejben 61'	Report	Gévay 7'; Sajbán 12'; Szakály 44'	Stadium: Tersztyánszky Ödön Sportközpont; Attendance: x Referee: Ákos Gaál
Note: COVID-19 pandemic in Hungary

24 February 2021 Round of 16	Paks	2 – 4	Budafok	Paks
13:00 CET	Nagy 15'; Vaszicsku 34' (o.g.)	Report	Skribek 25', 38', 45'; Zsóri 90+3'	Stadium: Fehérvári úti Stadion; Attendance: x Referee: Szabolcs Szilasi
Note: COVID-19 pandemic in Hungary

== Statistics ==
=== Appearances and goals ===
Last updated on 9 May 2021.

No.	Pos	Nat	Player	Total		Nemzeti Bajnokság I		Hungarian Cup	
No.	Pos	Nat	Player	Apps	Goals	Apps	Goals	Apps	Goals
1	GK	(Hungary) HUN	Lajos Hegedűs	19	-24	19	-24	0	-0
2	DF	(Hungary) HUN	András Vági	4	0	3	0	1	0
4	DF	(Hungary) HUN	Márton Lorentz	22	0	18	0	4	0
5	DF	(Hungary) HUN	Zsolt Gévay	18	3	15	2	3	1
6	DF	(Hungary) HUN	Norbert Szélpál	12	1	11	1	1	0
7	MF	(Hungary) HUN	Dénes Szakály	22	5	19	3	3	2
8	MF	(Hungary) HUN	Balázs Balogh	23	2	22	2	1	0
9	FW	(Hungary) HUN	János Hahn	31	24	28	22	3	2
10	MF	(Hungary) HUN	Zsolt Haraszti	25	6	22	4	3	2
11	DF	(Hungary) HUN	Attila Osváth	26	0	25	0	1	0
12	MF	(Hungary) HUN	Gábor Vas	8	0	5	0	3	0
13	FW	(Hungary) HUN	Dániel Böde	27	4	25	4	2	0
14	MF	(Hungary) HUN	István Bognár	33	10	30	10	3	0
16	FW	(Hungary) HUN	Martin Ádám	31	8	28	8	3	0
17	MF	(Hungary) HUN	Dávid Kulcsár	23	0	20	0	3	0
19	GK	(Hungary) HUN	Ádám Holczer	9	-23	6	-16	3	-7
20	FW	(Hungary) HUN	Máté Sajbán	34	4	31	3	3	1
21	MF	(Hungary) HUN	Kristóf Papp	18	3	16	3	2	0
22	MF	(Hungary) HUN	József Windecker	9	1	8	1	1	0
23	FW	(Hungary) HUN	Ákos Szendrei	8	2	6	2	2	0
24	DF	(Hungary) HUN	Bence Lenzsér	24	0	21	0	3	0
25	DF	(Hungary) HUN	Olivér Tamás	14	0	14	0	0	0
26	MF	(Hungary) HUN	Lajos Bertus	30	0	29	0	1	0
27	MF	(Hungary) HUN	Bálint Szabó	8	0	6	0	2	0
28	MF	(Hungary) HUN	Richárd Nagy	27	4	25	3	2	1
30	DF	(Hungary) HUN	János Szabó	32	3	30	3	2	0
31	GK	(Hungary) HUN	Gergő Rácz	10	-25	9	-24	1	-1
Youth players:
1	GK	(Hungary) HUN	Flórián Kovács	0	0	0	-0	0	-0
2	MF	(Hungary) HUN	Gergő Görög	2	0	1	0	1	0
15	MF	(Hungary) HUN	Dávid Bognár	4	0	3	0	1	0
46	FW	(Hungary) HUN	Ákos Debreceni	3	0	1	0	2	0
71	FW	(Hungary) HUN	Milán Ribár	0	0	0	0	0	0
71	MF	(Hungary) HUN	Gergő Gyurkits	0	0	0	0	0	0
Out to loan:
18	MF	(Hungary) HUN	Zoltán Sipos	3	0	2	0	1	0
Players no longer at the club:
27	MF	(Hungary) HUN	Róbert Kővári	1	0	0	0	1	0
29	MF	(Hungary) HUN	Richárd Csősz	7	0	6	0	1	0

=== Top scorers ===
Includes all competitive matches. The list is sorted by shirt number when total goals are equal.

Last updated on 9 May 2021

Position	Nation	Number	Name	Nemzeti Bajnokság I	Hungarian Cup	Total
1	(Hungary)	9	János Hahn	22	2	24
2	(Hungary)	14	István Bognár	10	0	10
3	(Hungary)	16	Martin Ádám	8	0	8
4	(Hungary)	10	Zsolt Haraszti	4	2	6
5	(Hungary)	7	Dénes Szakály	3	2	5
6	(Hungary)	13	Dániel Böde	4	0	4
7	(Hungary)	20	Máté Sajbán	3	1	4
8	(Hungary)	28	Richárd Nagy	3	1	4
9	(Hungary)	21	Kristóf Papp	3	0	3
10	(Hungary)	30	János Szabó	3	0	3
11	(Hungary)	5	Zsolt Gévay	2	1	3
12	(Hungary)	23	Ákos Szendrei	2	0	2
13	(Hungary)	8	Balázs Balogh	2	0	2
14	(Hungary)	6	Norbert Szélpál	1	0	1
15	(Hungary)	22	József Windecker	1	0	1
			Own Goals	5	1	6
			TOTALS	76	10	86

=== Disciplinary record ===
Includes all competitive matches. Players with 1 card or more included only.

Last updated on 9 May 2021

Position	Nation	Number	Name	Nemzeti Bajnokság I		Hungarian Cup		Total (Hu Total)	
Position	Nation	Number	Name	Booked	Sent off (straight red)	Booked	Sent off (straight red)	Booked	Sent off (straight red)
GK	(Hungary)	1	Lajos Hegedűs	0	1	0	0	0 (0)	1 (1)
DF	(Hungary)	4	Márton Lorentz	4	0	0	0	4 (4)	0 (0)
DF	(Hungary)	5	Zsolt Gévay	7	0	0	0	7 (7)	0 (0)
DF	(Hungary)	6	Norbert Szélpál	3	1	0	0	3 (3)	1 (1)
MF	(Hungary)	7	Dénes Szakály	2	0	0	0	2 (2)	0 (0)
MF	(Hungary)	8	Balázs Balogh	1	0	0	0	1 (1)	0 (0)
FW	(Hungary)	9	János Hahn	1	0	0	0	1 (1)	0 (0)
MF	(Hungary)	10	Zsolt Haraszti	3	0	0	0	3 (3)	0 (0)
DF	(Hungary)	11	Attila Osváth	5	0	1	0	6 (5)	0 (0)
FW	(Hungary)	13	Dániel Böde	8	0	0	0	8 (8)	0 (0)
MF	(Hungary)	14	István Bognár	1	0	0	0	1 (1)	0 (0)
FW	(Hungary)	16	Martin Ádám	5	0	0	0	5 (5)	0 (0)
MF	(Hungary)	17	Dávid Kulcsár	2	0	1	0	3 (2)	0 (0)
GK	(Hungary)	19	Ádám Holczer	1	0	0	0	1 (1)	0 (0)
FW	(Hungary)	20	Máté Sajbán	3	0	0	0	3 (3)	0 (0)
MF	(Hungary)	21	Kristóf Papp	1	1	0	0	1 (1)	1 (1)
MF	(Hungary)	22	József Windecker	1	0	0	0	1 (1)	0 (0)
DF	(Hungary)	24	Bence Lenzsér	10	0	1	0	11 (10)	0 (0)
DF	(Hungary)	25	Olivér Tamás	4	0	0	0	4 (4)	0 (0)
MF	(Hungary)	26	Lajos Bertus	1	0	0	0	1 (1)	0 (0)
MF	(Hungary)	27	Bálint Szabó	2	0	1	0	3 (2)	0 (0)
MF	(Hungary)	28	Richárd Nagy	3	0	0	0	3 (3)	0 (0)
DF	(Hungary)	30	János Szabó	7	0	0	0	7 (7)	0 (0)
GK	(Hungary)	31	Gergő Rácz	1	0	0	0	1 (1)	0 (0)
			TOTALS	76	3	4	0	80 (76)	3 (3)

=== Overall ===
Games played	37 (33 OTP Bank Liga and 4 Hungarian Cup)
Games won	17 (14 OTP Bank Liga and 3 Hungarian Cup)
Games drawn	8 (8 OTP Bank Liga and 0 Hungarian Cup)
Games lost	12 (11 OTP Bank Liga and 1 Hungarian Cup)
Goals scored	86
Goals conceded	72
Goal difference	+14
Yellow cards	80
Red cards	3
Worst discipline	(Hungary) Bence Lenzsér (11 (yellow card) , 0 (red card) )
Best result	9–2 (A) v Budafok - Nemzeti Bajnokság I - 25-04-2021
Worst result	0–5 (A) v Ferencváros - Nemzeti Bajnokság I - 11-09-2020
Most appearances	(Hungary) Máté Sajbán (34 appearances)
Top scorer	(Hungary) János Hahn (24 goals)
Points	60/111 (54.05%)

Last updated: 9 May 2021
