= Richard Nagy =

Richard or Richárd Nagy may refer to:

- Richard Nagy (swimmer) (born 1993), Slovak swimmer
- Richárd Nagy (footballer, born 1994), Hungarian football player
- Richárd Nagy (footballer, born 1995), Hungarian football player
- Richárd Nagy (footballer, born 1998), Hungarian football player
- Richard Nagy (footballer, born 2000), Slovak football player
