= János Hahn =

Hungarian footballer (born 1995)

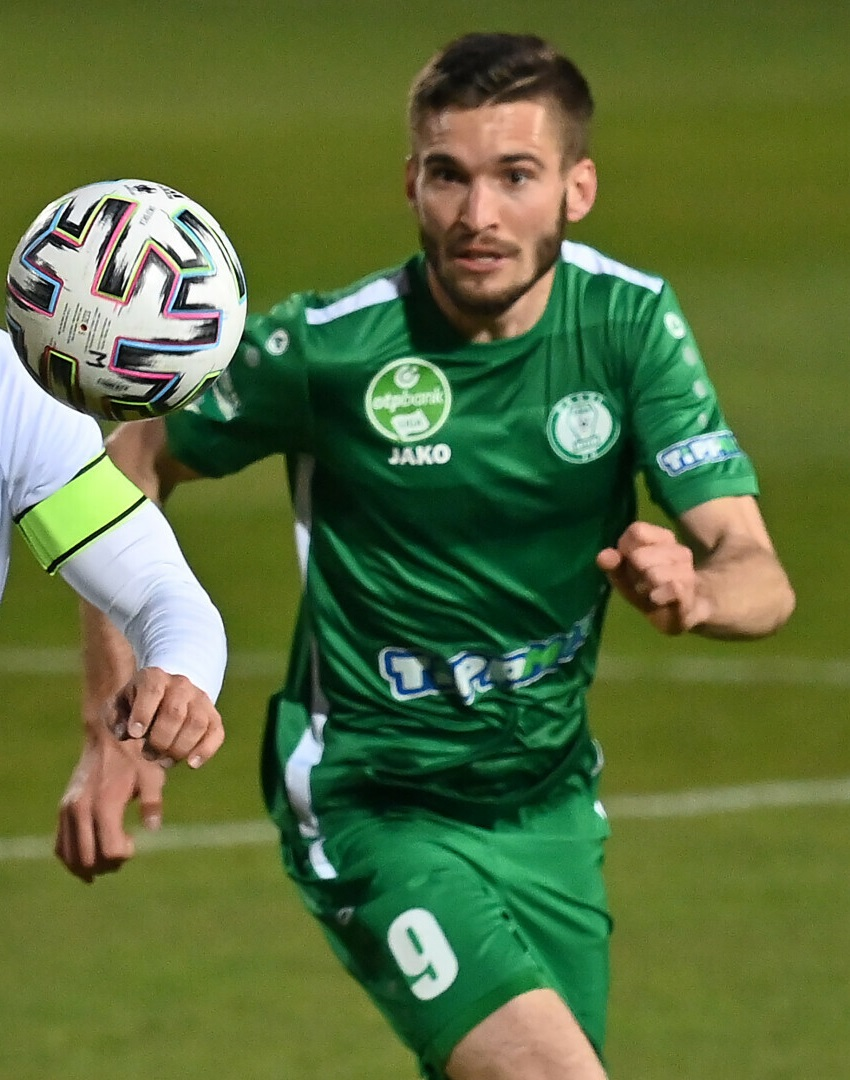
- Hahn playing for Paks in 2021

Personal information
- Full name: János Csaba Hahn
- Date of birth: 15 March 1995 (age 31)
- Place of birth: Szekszárd, Hungary
- Height: 1.83 m (6 ft 0 in)
- Position: Forward

Team information
- Current team: Paks
- Number: 9

Youth career
- 2004–2013: Paks
- 2013–2014: Puskás Akadémia
- 2015: Paks

Senior career*
Years	Team	Apps	(Gls)
2012–2013	Paks	3	(0)
2012–2013	Paks II	7	(0)
2013–2014	Puskás Akadémia	0	(0)
2014	Puskás Akadémia II	1	(0)
2014–2021	Paks	204	(61)
2014–2020	Paks II	39	(33)
2021–2022	DAC Dunajská Streda	21	(3)
2022–	Paks	80	(18)
2023–	Paks II	3	(1)

International career^{‡}
2013	Hungary U18	1	(0)
2021	Hungary	7	(0)
- * Club domestic league appearances and goals as of 30 May 2026 ‡ National team caps and goals as of 22:44, 22 June 2021 (UTC)

János Csaba Hahn (born 15 March 1995), nicknamed Janó, is a Hungarian professional footballer who plays as a forward for Nemzeti Bajnokság I club Paks.

== Club career ==
=== Paks ===
Hahn progressed through the youth system of Paks and made his senior debut in the Nemzeti Bajnokság I at the age of 17 on 30 November 2012, appearing as a substitute in a 2–0 home victory against Pápa. He entered the match in the 87th minute, replacing Márton Eppel.

=== Puskás Akadémia ===
On 25 July 2013, Hahn joined newly promoted Nemzeti Bajnokság I club Puskás Akadémia as a free agent after his contract expired at Paks, signing a three-year deal as a Hungary youth international.

=== Return to Paks ===
Hahn returned to Paks after one year away, with Zsolt Gévay also rejoining the club.

He became the top goalscorer of the 2020–21 Nemzeti Bajnokság I with 22 goals, the highest total in the league for six years, as Paks scored a record 76 goals during the season, the most by any team since the league was reduced to 12 clubs.

=== DAC Dunajská Streda ===
On 3 September 2021, Hahn transferred from Hungary to Slovak First Football League club DAC Dunajská Streda, signing a two-year contract with an option for a further season.

=== Third spell at Paks ===
On 31 August 2022, Hahn returned from Slovakia to the Tolna County club in a permanent transfer shortly before the Nemzeti Bajnokság I transfer deadline.

On 15 May 2024, he won the 2024 Magyar Kupa final with Paks by beating Ferencváros 2–0 at the Puskás Aréna.

== International career ==
Hahn appeared for the Hungary U18 national team on 14 March 2013, coming on as a substitute in the 75th minute for Szabolcs Varga in a 4–2 win against Macedonia in Telki. He was later called up to the Hungary U19 national team by Géza Mészöly for their first training camp of the year in preparation for the 2014 UEFA European Under-19 Championship. Hahn was not included in the final squad for the tournament.

On 1 June 2021, Hahn was included in the final 26-man squad to represent Hungary at the rescheduled UEFA Euro 2020 tournament. He debuted for Hungary in a friendly 1–0 win over Cyprus on 4 June 2021.

== Career statistics ==
=== Club ===
As of match played 1 February 2026

Appearances and goals by club, season and competition
Club	Season	League			National cup (Note: Includes Magyar Kupa, Slovak Cup)		League cup (Note: Includes Ligakupa)		Europe		Total	
Club	Season	Division	Apps	Goals	Apps	Goals	Apps	Goals	Apps	Goals	Apps	Goals
Paks	2012–13	Nemzeti Bajnokság I	3	0	2	0	4	0	—		9	0
Paks II	2012–13	Nemzeti Bajnokság II	7	0	—		—		—		7	0
Puskás Akadémia	2013–14	Nemzeti Bajnokság I	0	0	—		2	0	—		2	0
Puskás Akadémia II	2013–14	Megyei Bajnokság I	1	0	—		—		—		1	0
Paks	2014–15	Nemzeti Bajnokság I	22	1	1	0	7	0	—		30	1
Paks	2015–16	Nemzeti Bajnokság I	29	7	1	0	—		—		30	7
Paks	2016–17	Nemzeti Bajnokság I	30	6	2	1	—		—		32	7
Paks	2017–18	Nemzeti Bajnokság I	30	5	3	0	—		—		33	5
Paks	2018–19	Nemzeti Bajnokság I	31	9	4	2	—		—		35	11
Paks	2019–20	Nemzeti Bajnokság I	30	7	4	3	—		—		34	10
Paks	2020–21	Nemzeti Bajnokság I	28	22	3	2	—		—		31	24
Paks	2021–22	Nemzeti Bajnokság I	4	4	—		—		—		4	4
Paks	Total		204	61	18	8	7	0	—		229	69
Paks II	2014–15	Megyei Bajnokság I	16	23	—		—		—		16	23
Paks II	2015–16	Nemzeti Bajnokság III	10	3	—		—		—		10	3
Paks II	2016–17	Nemzeti Bajnokság III	6	4	—		—		—		6	4
Paks II	2017–18	Nemzeti Bajnokság III	5	3	—		—		—		5	3
Paks II	2018–19	Nemzeti Bajnokság III	1	0	—		—		—		1	0
Paks II	2020–21	Nemzeti Bajnokság III	1	0	—		—		—		1	0
Paks II	Total		39	33	—		—		—		39	33
DAC Dunajská Streda	2021–22	Slovak First Football League	18	3	1	0	—		—		19	3
DAC Dunajská Streda	2022–23	Slovak First Football League	3	0	—		—		2 (Note: Appearances in UEFA Europa Conference League)	0	5	0
DAC Dunajská Streda	Total		21	3	1	0	—		2	0	24	3
Paks	2022–23	Nemzeti Bajnokság I	28	3	4	0	—		—		32	3
Paks	2023–24	Nemzeti Bajnokság I	24	4	5	3	—		—		29	7
Paks	2024–25	Nemzeti Bajnokság I	0	0	0	0	—		2 (Note: One appearance in UEFA Europa League, one appearance in UEFA Conference League)	0	2	0
Paks	2025–26	Nemzeti Bajnokság I	17	7	1	1	—		5 (Note: Two appearances in UEFA Europa League, three appearances in UEFA Conference League)	0	23	8
Paks	Total		69	14	10	4	—		7	0	86	18
Paks II	2023–24	Nemzeti Bajnokság III	1	0	—		—		—		1	0
Paks II	2024–25	Nemzeti Bajnokság III	2	1	—		—		—		2	1
Paks II	Total		3	1	—		—		—		3	1
Career total			347	112	31	12	13	0	9	0	400	124

=== International ===
Appearances and goals by national team and year
Team	Year	Total	
Team	Year	Apps	Goals
Hungary U18	2013	1	0
Hungary	2021	7	0
Total		8	0

== Honours ==
Paks II

- Megyei Bajnokság I – Tolna: 2014–15

Paks

- Magyar Kupa: 2023–24

Individual

- Nemzeti Bajnokság I top goalscorer: 2020–21
