= Kristóf Papp =

Hungarian footballer (born 1993)

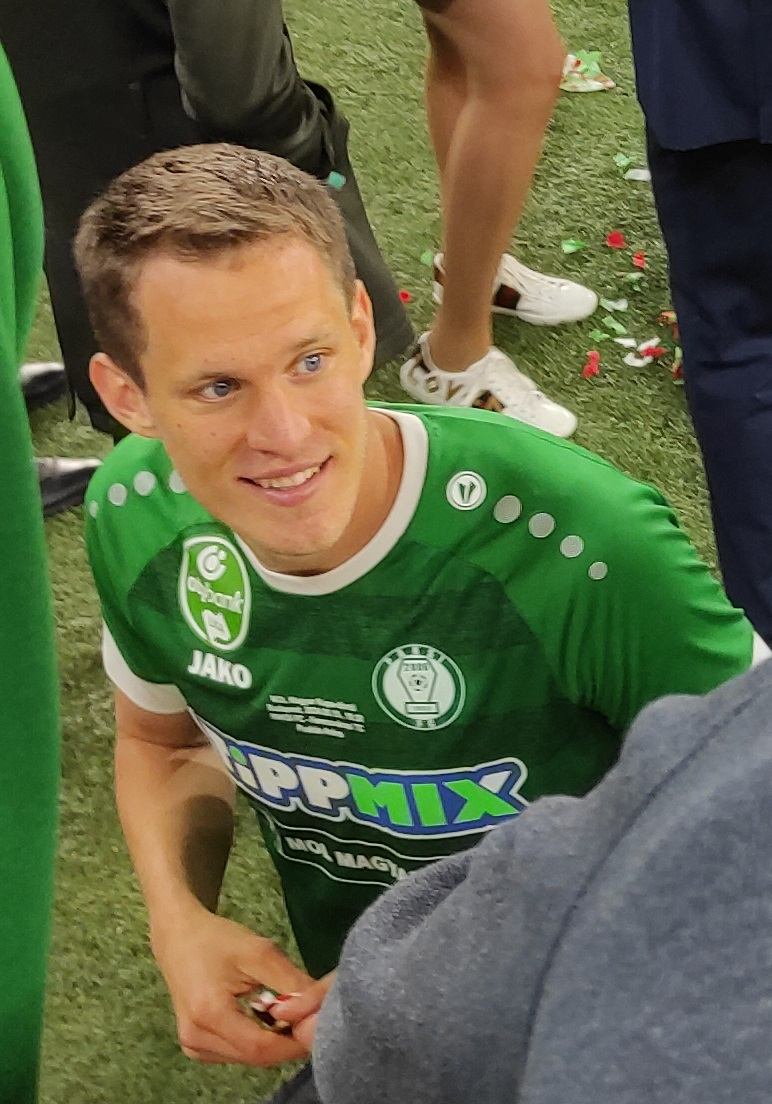
- Papp with Paks in 2024

Personal information
- Date of birth: 14 May 1993 (age 33)
- Place of birth: Kerepestarcsa, Hungary
- Height: 1.83 m (6 ft 0 in)
- Position: Midfielder

Team information
- Current team: Paks
- Number: 21

Youth career
- 2004–2005: Dunakanyar
- 2005–2009: Vác

Senior career*
Years	Team	Apps	(Gls)
2009–2013	Vác	23	(1)
2013	Berkenye	5	(3)
2013–2015	Gyirmót	56	(9)
2015–	Paks	282	(27)
2015–	Paks II	10	(0)
- * Club domestic league appearances and goals as of 30 May 2026

Kristóf Papp (born 14 May 1993) is a Hungarian professional footballer who plays as a midfielder for Nemzeti Bajnokság I club Paks.

== Career ==
=== Paks ===
On 8 August 2015, Papp played his first match for Paks in a 3–1 win against Honvéd in the Hungarian League.

On 15 May 2024, he won the 2024 Magyar Kupa Final with Paks by beating Ferencváros 2–0 at the Puskás Aréna.

On 14 May 2025, he won the 2025 Magyar Kupa final with Paksi FC after beating Ferencvárosi TC 4–3 on penalty shoot-out.

== Career statistics ==
=== Club ===
As of match played 14 November 2024

Appearances and goals by club, season and competition
Club	Season	League			National cup (Note: Includes Magyar Kupa)		League cup (Note: Includes Ligakupa)		Europe		Other		Total	
Club	Season	Division	Apps	Goals	Apps	Goals	Apps	Goals	Apps	Goals	Apps	Goals	Apps	Goals
Vác	2009–10	Nemzeti Bajnokság II	1	0	2	0	—		—		—		3	0
Vác	2010–11	Nemzeti Bajnokság II	2	0	—		—		—		—		2	0
Vác	2011–12	Nemzeti Bajnokság II	5	0	1	1	—		—		—		6	1
Vác	2012–13	Nemzeti Bajnokság II	15	1	4	0	—		—		—		19	1
Vác	Total		23	1	7	1	—		—		—		30	2
Berkenye	2012–13	Megyei Bajnokság I	5	3	—		—		—		5 (Note: Three appearances and three goal in Magyar Kupa qualifying round, two appearances in Megyei Bajnokság I Promotion play-offs)	3	10	6
Gyirmót	2013–14	Nemzeti Bajnokság II	30	8	2	0	0	0	—		—		32	8
Gyirmót	2014–15	Nemzeti Bajnokság II	26	1	3	0	0	0	—		—		29	1
Gyirmót	Total		56	9	5	0	0	0	—		—		61	9
Paks	2015–16	Nemzeti Bajnokság I	27	4	2	0	—		—		—		29	4
Paks	2016–17	Nemzeti Bajnokság I	31	1	0	0	—		—		—		31	1
Paks	2017–18	Nemzeti Bajnokság I	29	5	2	1	—		—		—		31	6
Paks	2018–19	Nemzeti Bajnokság I	28	1	2	0	—		—		—		30	1
Paks	2019–20	Nemzeti Bajnokság I	14	1	2	0	—		—		—		16	1
Paks	2020–21	Nemzeti Bajnokság I	16	3	2	0	—		—		—		18	3
Paks	2021–22	Nemzeti Bajnokság I	19	3	2	0	—		—		—		21	3
Paks	2022–23	Nemzeti Bajnokság I	31	4	4	1	—		—		—		35	5
Paks	2023–24	Nemzeti Bajnokság I	32	2	5	3	—		—		—		37	5
Paks	2024–25	Nemzeti Bajnokság I	12	1	2	2	—		8 (Note: Two appearances in UEFA Europa League, six appearances and two goal in UEFA Conference League)	2	—		22	5
Paks	Total		239	25	23	7	—		8	2	—		270	34
Paks II	2015–16	Nemzeti Bajnokság III	5	0	—		—		—		—		5	0
Paks II	2016–17	Nemzeti Bajnokság III	1	0	—		—		—		—		1	0
Paks II	2020–21	Nemzeti Bajnokság III	3	0	—		—		—		—		3	0
Paks II	2023–24	Nemzeti Bajnokság III	1	0	—		—		—		—		1	0
Paks II	Total		10	0	—		—		—		—		10	0
Career total			333	38	35	8	0	0	8	2	5	3	381	51

== Honours ==
Paks

- Magyar Kupa: 2023–24
