= Richárd Jelena =

Hungarian footballer (born 1998)

Personal information
- Date of birth: 8 January 1998 (age 28)
- Place of birth: Pécs, Hungary
- Height: 1.91 m (6 ft 3 in)
- Position: Centre-forward

Team information
- Current team: Ajka (on loan from Kozármisleny)
- Number: 32

Youth career
- 2003–2007: Pécsi VSK
- 2007–2011: Kozármisleny
- 2011–2013: MTK Budapest
- 2013–2015: Pécs
- 2015–2016: Budapest Honvéd

Senior career*
Years	Team	Apps	(Gls)
2015–2016	Budapest Honvéd	2	(0)
2016–2019	Paks	14	(0)
2017	→ Csákvár (loan)	8	(4)
2018	→ Zalaegerszeg (loan)	13	(2)
2018–2019	→ Mosonmagyaróvár (loan)	30	(6)
2019–2020	Kozármisleny	14	(12)
2020–2021	Kisvárda	19	(3)
2021	→ FK Csíkszereda (loan)	18	(12)
2022–2024	FK Csíkszereda	49	(16)
2024–2025	Tatabánya	21	(2)
2025–	Kozármisleny	15	(2)
2026–	→ Ajka (loan)	7	(1)

International career
2014	Hungary U17	1	(0)
- * Club domestic league appearances and goals as of 31 May 2026

Richárd Jelena (born 8 January 1998) is a Hungarian professional footballer who plays for Nemzeti Bajnokság II club Ajka on loan from Kozármisleny.
