= András Szalai =

Hungarian footballer

Personal information
- Full name: József András Szalai
- Date of birth: 3 February 1998 (age 28)
- Place of birth: Budapest, Hungary
- Height: 1.72 m (5 ft 8 in)
- Position: Centre-back

Team information
- Current team: Dunaharaszti
- Number: 19

Youth career
- 2005–2006: Istenhegy FC
- 2006–2007: Magyar AC
- 2007–2008: III. Kerület
- 2008–2013: Vasas
- 2013–2016: MTK Budapest

Senior career*
Years	Team	Apps	(Gls)
2016–2020	Paks	5	(0)
2017–2018	→ Dorog (loan)	32	(2)
2018	→ Balmazújváros (loan)	19	(1)
2019	→ Komárno (loan)	4	(0)
2020–2021	Taksony	23	(1)
2021–	Dunaharaszti	21	(2)

International career
2014	Hungary U-16	1	(0)
2016–2017	Hungary U-18	4	(0)
2016–2018	Hungary U-19	11	(1)
- * Club domestic league appearances and goals as of 19:38, 6 September 2021 (UTC)

András Szalai (born 3 February 1998) is a Hungarian football player who currently plays for Dunaharaszti MTK.

== Career ==
=== Paks ===
On 13 August 2016, Szalai played his first match for Paks in a 1–3 loss against Budapest Honvéd FC in the Hungarian League.

== Club statistics ==
Appearances and goals by club, season and competition
Club	Season	League		Cup		Europe		Total	
Club	Season	Apps	Goals	Apps	Goals	Apps	Goals	Apps	Goals
Paks
Paks	2016–17	5	0	2	0	–	–	7	0
Paks	Total	5	0	2	0	–	–	7	0
Dorog
Dorog	2017–18	32	2	2	0	–	–	34	2
Dorog	Total	32	2	2	0	–	–	34	2
Balmazújváros
Balmazújváros	2018–19	19	1	1	0	–	–	20	1
Balmazújváros	Total	19	1	1	0	–	–	20	1
Career total		56	3	5	0	0	0	61	3

Updated to games played as of 16 December 2018.
