= Dávid Bor =

Hungarian footballer

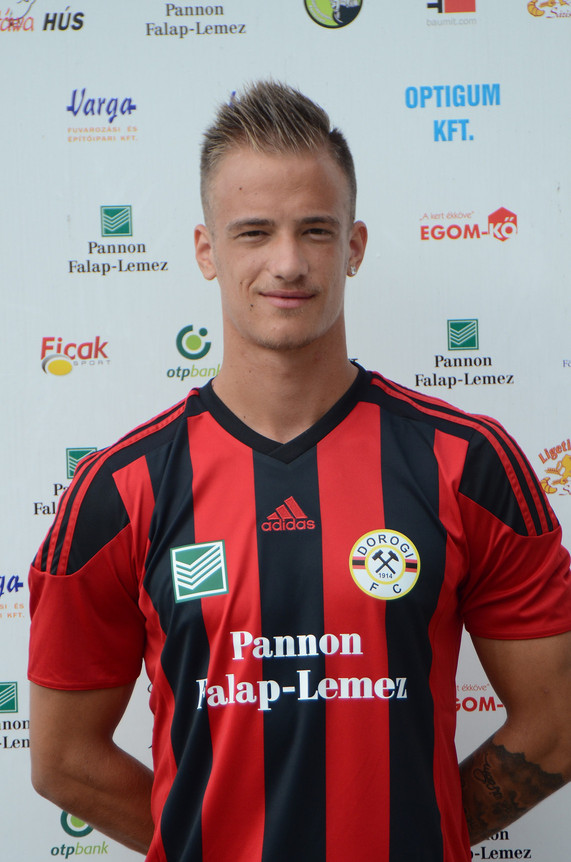
- Bor at Dorog (2016)

Personal information
- Full name: Dávid Ferenc Bor
- Date of birth: 10 December 1994 (age 31)
- Place of birth: Budapest, Hungary
- Height: 1.88 m (6 ft 2 in)
- Position: Defender

Team information
- Current team: Kozármisleny
- Number: 9

Youth career
- 2003–2007: Simontornya
- 2007: Puskás Akadémia
- 2008–2011: Simontornya
- 2011–2014: Paks

Senior career*
Years	Team	Apps	(Gls)
2010–2011	Simontornya	3	(3)
2014–2020	Paks	5	(2)
2016	→ Balmazújváros (loan)	11	(3)
2016–2017	→ Dorog (loan)	26	(5)
2017–2018	→ Sopron (loan)	24	(0)
2018–2019	→ Soroksár (loan)	30	(2)
2020–2021	FK Csíkszereda	37	(1)
2022–2023	Békéscsaba	10	(0)
2023–	Kozármisleny	7	(0)
- * Club domestic league appearances and goals as of 8 October 2023

Dávid Bor (born 10 December 1994) is a Hungarian footballer who plays as a defender for Kozármisleny.

== Career statistics ==
Appearances and goals by club, season and competition
Club	Season	League			Cup		League Cup		Europe		Total	
Club	Season	Division	Apps	Goals	Apps	Goals	Apps	Goals	Apps	Goals	Apps	Goals
Balmazújváros	2015–16	Nemzeti Bajnokság II	11	3	0	0	—		—		11	3
Dorog	2016–17	Nemzeti Bajnokság II	27	5	3	3	—		—		30	8
Sopron	2017–18	Nemzeti Bajnokság II	24	0	0	0	—		—		24	0
Soroksár	2018–19	Nemzeti Bajnokság II	30	2	9	1	—		—		39	3
Paks
Paks	2013–14	Nemzeti Bajnokság I	1	0	0	0	2	0	—		3	0
Paks	2014–15	Nemzeti Bajnokság I	1	1	1	0	8	4	—		10	5
Paks	2015–16	Nemzeti Bajnokság I	1	0	3	3	—		—		4	3
Paks	2019–20	Nemzeti Bajnokság I	2	1	6	1	—		—		8	2
Paks	Total		5	2	10	4	10	4	0	0	25	10
Career total			97	12	22	8	10	4	0	0	129	24

Updated to games played as of 11 March 2020.
