= Márk Simon =

Hungarian footballer (born 1996)

Personal information
- Date of birth: 4 June 1996 (age 30)
- Place of birth: Salgótarján, Hungary
- Height: 1.82 m (6 ft 0 in)
- Position: Midfielder

Youth career
- 2003–2007: Salgótarján
- 2007–2014: Vasas
- 2014–2017: Paks

Senior career*
Years	Team	Apps	(Gls)
2014–2020	Paks II	80	(22)
2017–2020	Paks	4	(0)
2018–2019	→ Csákvári TK (loan)	28	(3)
2019	→ Győri ETO (loan)	8	(0)
2020	→ Tiszakécske (loan)	7	(1)
2020–2022	Tiszakécske	54	(15)
- * Club domestic league appearances and goals as of 1 May 2022

Márk Simon (born 4 June 1996) is a Hungarian football player.

== Career ==
=== Paks ===
On 23 September 2017, Simon played his first match for Paks in a 1–0 win against Balmazújvárs in the Hungarian League.

== Career statistics ==
As of 9 December 2017

Appearances and goals by club, season and competition
Club	Season	League			Cup		Europe		Total	
Club	Season	Division	Apps	Goals	Apps	Goals	Apps	Goals	Apps	Goals
Paks II	2014–15	Megyei Bajnokság I	15	7	—		—		15	7
Paks II	2015–16	Nemzeti Bajnokság III	23	1	—		—		23	1
Paks II	2016–17	Nemzeti Bajnokság III	30	6	—		—		30	6
Paks II	2017–18	Nemzeti Bajnokság III	12	8	—		—		12	8
Paks II	Total		80	22	0	0	0	0	80	22
Paks	2017–18	Nemzeti Bajnokság I	1	0	2	1	—		3	1
Career total			81	22	2	1	0	0	83	23
