= Dávid Kulcsár =

Hungarian footballer

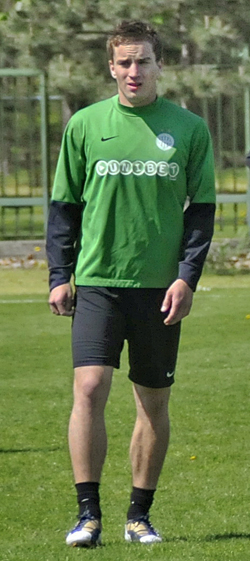

Personal information
- Date of birth: 25 February 1988 (age 38)
- Place of birth: Miskolc, Hungary
- Height: 1.80 m (5 ft 11 in)
- Position: Midfielder

Team information
- Current team: III. Kerület

Youth career
- 2002–2003: Diósgyőr
- 2003–2007: Ferencváros

Senior career*
Years	Team	Apps	(Gls)
2006–2011	Ferencváros	51	(3)
2009	→ Vecsés (loan)	14	(2)
2011	→ Vasas (loan)	14	(0)
2011–2012	Vasas	16	(3)
2012	Ferencváros	9	(1)
2012–2022	Paks	191	(9)
2022–	III. Kerület	0	(0)

International career
2010–2011	Hungary U-21	3	(0)
- * Club domestic league appearances and goals as of 20:50, 4 February 2022 (UTC)

Dávid Kulcsár (born 25 February 1988 in Miskolc) is a Hungarian football player who plays for III. Kerületi TVE.

== Career statistics ==
Appearances and goals by club, season and competition
Club	Season	League		Cup		League Cup		Europe		Total	
Club	Season	Apps	Goals	Apps	Goals	Apps	Goals	Apps	Goals	Apps	Goals
Ferencváros	2006–07	5	0	0	0	–	–	–	–	5	0
Ferencváros	2007–08	15	2	0	0	–	–	–	–	15	2
Ferencváros	2008–09	2	0	1	0	6	0	–	–	9	0
Ferencváros	2009–10	22	0	0	0	7	1	–	–	29	1
Ferencváros	2010–11	7	1	3	0	1	0	–	–	11	1
Ferencváros	2011–12	9	1	3	0	1	0	–	–	13	1
Ferencváros	Total	60	4	7	0	15	1	0	0	82	5
Vecsés	2008–09	14	2	0	0	–	–	–	–	14	2
Vasas	2010–11	14	0	0	0	0	0	–	–	14	0
Vasas	2011–12	16	3	2	0	2	0	–	–	20	3
Vasas	Total	30	3	2	0	2	0	0	0	34	3
Paks	2012–13	16	1	2	0	5	0	–	–	23	1
Paks	2013–14	3	0	0	0	1	0	–	–	4	0
Paks	2014–15	25	0	1	0	7	0	–	–	33	0
Paks	2015–16	32	1	1	0	–	–	–	–	33	1
Paks	2016–17	30	3	1	0	–	–	–	–	31	3
Paks	2017–18	25	2	2	0	–	–	–	–	27	2
Paks	2018–19	19	1	2	0	–	–	–	–	21	1
Paks	2019–20	17	1	2	0	–	–	–	–	19	1
Paks	2020–21	20	0	3	0	–	–	–	–	23	0
Paks	Total	187	9	14	0	13	0	0	0	214	9
Career total		291	18	23	0	30	1	0	0	344	19

Updated to games played as of 15 May 2021.
