= Zsolt Gévay =

Hungarian footballer

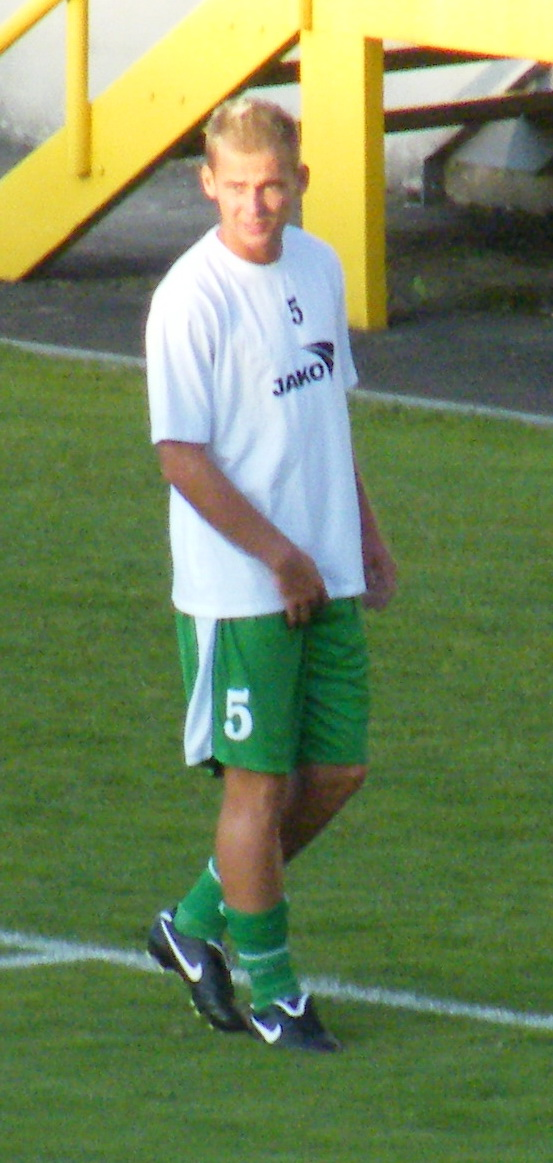
- Gévay in 2009

Personal information
- Date of birth: 19 November 1987 (age 39)
- Place of birth: Dunaújváros, Hungary
- Height: 1.87 m (6 ft 1 1/2 in)
- Position: Defender

Team information
- Current team: Paks
- Number: 77

Youth career
- 2002–2005: Videoton

Senior career*
Years	Team	Apps	(Gls)
2005–2009	Videoton	1	(0)
2007–2009	→ Makó (loan)	56	(5)
2009–2012	Paks	28	(1)
2012–2013	Gyirmót	26	(4)
2013–2014	Mezőkövesd	20	(0)
2014–	Paks	177	(13)
- * Club domestic league appearances and goals as of 9 May 2023

Zsolt Gévay (born 19 November 1987) is a Hungarian professional footballer who plays for Paks, as a defender.

== Career ==
=== Paks ===
On 15 May 2024, he won the 2024 Magyar Kupa Final with Paks by beating Ferencváros 2–0 at the Puskás Aréna.

== Career statistics ==
Appearances and goals by club, season and competition
Club	Season	League			Cup		League Cup		Europe		Total	
Club	Season	Division	Apps	Goals	Apps	Goals	Apps	Goals	Apps	Goals	Apps	Goals
Makó
Makó	2007–08	Nemzeti Bajnokság II	27	2	0	0	—		—		27	2
Makó	2008–09	Nemzeti Bajnokság II	29	3	7	1	—		—		36	4
Makó	Total		56	5	7	1	0	0	0	0	63	6
Gyirmót	2012–13	Nemzeti Bajnokság II	26	4	1	0	6	0	—		33	4
Mezőkövesd	2013–14	Nemzeti Bajnokság I	20	0	3	0	5	1	—		28	1
Paks	2009–10	Nemzeti Bajnokság I	12	0	1	0	15	1	—		28	1
Paks	2010–11	Nemzeti Bajnokság I	5	0	1	2	7	1	—		13	3
Paks	2011–12	Nemzeti Bajnokság I	11	1	0	0	8	5	0	0	19	6
Paks	2014–15	Nemzeti Bajnokság I	29	1	0	0	3	1	—		32	2
Paks	2015–16	Nemzeti Bajnokság I	31	3	0	0	—		—		31	3
Paks	2016–17	Nemzeti Bajnokság I	31	2	0	0	—		—		31	2
Paks	2017–18	Nemzeti Bajnokság I	30	1	2	0	—		—		32	1
Paks	2018–19	Nemzeti Bajnokság I	22	3	1	1	—		—		23	4
Paks	2019–20	Nemzeti Bajnokság I	14	1	6	0	—		—		20	1
Paks	2020–21	Nemzeti Bajnokság I	15	2	3	1	—		—		18	3
Paks	Total		200	14	14	4	33	8	0	0	247	26
Career total			302	23	25	5	44	9	0	0	371	37

Updated to games played as of 15 May 2021.
