= Richárd Nagy (footballer, born 1995) =

Hungarian footballer

Personal information
- Full name: Richárd Nagy
- Date of birth: 15 August 1995 (age 31)
- Place of birth: Budapest, Hungary
- Height: 1.83 m (6 ft 0 in)
- Position: Forward

Team information
- Current team: Veszprém (on loan from Paks)

Youth career
- 2007–2010: Felcsút
- 2010–2013: MTK

Senior career*
Years	Team	Apps	(Gls)
2014–	Paks	12	(0)
2016–2017	→ SZEOL (loan)	18	(4)
2019–	→ Veszprém (loan)		
- * Club domestic league appearances and goals as of 19 May 2019

Richárd Nagy (born 15 August 1995) is a Hungarian football player who currently plays for FC Veszprém on loan from Paksi SE.

== Career statistics ==
Appearances and goals by club, season and competition
Club	Season	League			Cup		League Cup		Europe		Total	
Club	Season	Division	Apps	Goals	Apps	Goals	Apps	Goals	Apps	Goals	Apps	Goals
Paks
Paks	2013–14	Nemzeti Bajnokság I	1	0	0	0	1	0	—		2	0
Paks	2014–15	Nemzeti Bajnokság I	3	0	1	1	5	1	—		9	2
Paks	2015–16	Nemzeti Bajnokság I	3	0	3	1	—		—		6	1
Paks	2017–18	Nemzeti Bajnokság I	2	0	3	2	—		—		5	2
Paks	2018–19	Nemzeti Bajnokság I	3	0	3	1	—		—		6	1
Paks	Total		12	0	10	5	6	1	0	0	28	6
SZEOL	2016–17	Nemzeti Bajnokság II	18	4	0	0	—		—		18	4
Career total			30	4	10	5	6	1	0	0	46	10

Updated to games played as of 19 May 2019.
