= 2019–20 Diósgyőri VTK season =

Diósgyőri VTK
2019–20 season
- Chairman: Gergely Sántha
- Manager: Fernando (until 1 September 2019); Tamás Feczkó
- Stadium: Diósgyőri Stadion
- NB 1: 9th
- Hungarian Cup: Round of 32
- Top goalscorer: League: Mirko Ivanovski (6); Bence Iszlai (6); All: Mirko Ivanovski (6); Bence Iszlai (6)
- Highest home attendance: 8,376 vs Újpest (7 March 2020)
- Lowest home attendance: 2,255 vs Mezőkövesd (30 May 2020)
Home colours	Away colours

The 2019–20 season will be Diósgyőri VTK's 54th competitive season, 9th consecutive season in the OTP Bank Liga and 109th year in existence as a football club.

== Transfers ==
=== Summer ===
In: Note: Flags indicate national team as defined under FIFA eligibility rules; some limited exceptions apply. Players may hold more than one non-FIFA nationality.

No.	Pos.	Nation	Player
12	FW	MKD	Mirko Ivanovski (from (Croatia) Hajduk Split)
14	MF	HUN	Zsolt Óvári (loan return from Balmazújváros)
20	MF	HUN	Bence Szabó (from Fehérvár)
26	MF	HUN	Kornél Szűcs (from Diósgyőr U-19)
27	MF	HUN	Dániel Prosser (from Puskás Akadémia)
28	MF	POR	Rui Pedro (loan from Ferencváros)
44	GK	SRB	Branislav Danilović (from Puskás Akadémia)
47	FW	HUN	Richárd Zsolnai (from Vác)
51	DF	HUN	András Vági (from Paks)
55	FW	SUI	Haris Tabaković (from Debrecen)
70	FW	HUN	Kristóf Korbély (from Diósgyőr U-19)
74	MF	HUN	Patrik Ternován (loan return from Balmazújváros)
88	MF	GHA	Joachim Adukor (from (Bosnia and Herzegovina) Sarajevo)
90	MF	HUN	Bence Iszlai (from Mezőkövesd)
92	DF	HUN	Donát Orosz (from Diósgyőr U-19)
97	FW	HUN	Gábor Boros (from Diósgyőr U-19)
—	DF	HUN	Marcell Farkas (from Diósgyőr U-19)
—	DF	HUN	Marcell Orosz (from Diósgyőr U-19)

Out: Note: Flags indicate national team as defined under FIFA eligibility rules; some limited exceptions apply. Players may hold more than one non-FIFA nationality.

No.	Pos.	Nation	Player
6	MF	HUN	Mátyás Tajti (to (Poland) Zagłębie Lubin)
10	FW	HUN	Richárd Vernes (to (Israel) Hapoel Kfar Saba)
11	MF	HUN	Balázs Szabó (to Balmazújváros)
21	DF	HUN	Tamás Géringer (loan to Kazincbarcika)
22	GK	CRO	Ivan Radoš (to Vasas)
23	DF	HUN	Dávid Forgács
28	MF	CRO	Tomislav Mazalović (to (Croatia) Inter Zaprešić)
50	DF	HUN	Bence Bárdos (loan to Szolnok)

=== Winter ===
In: Note: Flags indicate national team as defined under FIFA eligibility rules; some limited exceptions apply. Players may hold more than one non-FIFA nationality.

No.	Pos.	Nation	Player
9	MF	HUN	Tamás Kiss (loan from Puskás Akadémia)
11	FW	COL	José Cortés (from (Bolivia) Club Destroyers)
16	FW	HUN	Gábor Molnár (footballer) (from Mezőkövesd)
22	MF	HUN	Tamás Egerszegi (loan from Paks)
27	DF	ALB	Hysen Memolla (from (Finland) KPV)

Out: Note: Flags indicate national team as defined under FIFA eligibility rules; some limited exceptions apply. Players may hold more than one non-FIFA nationality.

No.	Pos.	Nation	Player
4	DF	HUN	Márk Tamás (to (Poland) Śląsk Wrocław)
5	MF	CMR	Ismaila Ousman
9	MF	HUN	Patrik Bacsa (to Újpest)
11	DF	SVK	Martin Juhar
20	MF	HUN	Bence Szabó (to Debrecen)
22	MF	HUN	Barnabás Tóth (loan to Tiszakécske)
27	FW	HUN	Dániel Prosser (to MTK Budapest)
29	DF	CMR	Yannick Ndzouma
47	FW	HUN	Richárd Zsolnai (loan to Budafok)
91	FW	SRB	Branko Mihajlović (to (Serbia) Macva)

== Competitions ==
=== Overview ===
Competition	First match	Last match	Starting round	Final position	Record							
Competition	First match	Last match	Starting round	Final position	Pld	W	D	L	GF	GA	GD	Win %
Nemzeti Bajnokság I	4 August 2019	–	Matchday 1	Matchday 33	14	5	1	8	15	23	−8	35.71
Magyar Kupa	21 September 2019	3 December 2019	Sixth round	Round of 32	3	2	0	1	4	1	+3	66.67
Total					17	7	1	9	19	24	−5	41.18

Last updated: 8 December 2019
Source: Competitions

=== Nemzeti Bajnokság I ===
==== League table ====
Pos	Team	Pld	W	D	L	GF	GA	GD	Pts	Qualification or relegation
7	Zalaegerszeg	33	11	10	12	51	44	+7	43	
8	Kisvárda	33	12	6	15	42	43	−1	42	
9	Diósgyőr	33	12	5	16	40	52	−12	41	
10	Paks	33	11	8	14	46	53	−7	41	
11	Debrecen (R)	33	11	6	16	48	57	−9	39	Relegation to the Nemzeti Bajnokság II

Source: Hungarian Football Federation (in Hungarian), Soccerway
Rules for classification: 1) Points; 2) Matches won; 3) Goal difference; 4) Goals scored; 5) Head-to-head points; 6) Head-to-head goal difference; 7) Head-to-head away goals scored; 8) Fair play ranking; 9) Drawing of lots.
(R) Relegated

==== Results summary ====
Overall								Home						Away					
Pld	W	D	L	GF	GA	GD	Pts	W	D	L	GF	GA	GD	W	D	L	GF	GA	GD
33	12	5	16	40	52	−12	41	7	2	7	19	20	−1	5	3	9	21	32	−11

Last updated: 27 June 2020.
Source: NB1

==== Results by round ====
Round	1	2	3	4	5	6	7	8	9	10	11	12	13	14	15	16	17	18	19	20	21	22	23	24	25	26	27	28	29	30	31	32	33
Ground	H	H	A	H	A	H	A	H	A	A	H	A	A	H	A	H	A	H	A	H	H	A	A	H	A	H	A	H	A	H	A	A	H
Result	W	L	L	L	L	W	L	D	L	W	W	L	W	L	W	L	W	W	D	L	W	D	W	W	D	W	L	D	L	L	L	L	L
Position	4	7	9	10	12	9	12	11	11	10	9	9	8	9	9	9	8	5	5	7	6	6	5	5	5	4	4	5	5	5	6	7	9

Updated to match(es) played on 27 June 2020. Source: Matches
A = Away; H = Home; W = Win; D = Draw; L = Loss

==== Matches ====
4 August 2019 1	Diósgyőr	2 – 1	Budapest Honvéd	Miskolc
18:00 CEST	Tajti 49' (pen.); Shestakov 75'	Report	Ngog 37' (pen.)	Stadium: Diósgyőri Stadion; Attendance: 6,139; Referee: Tamás Bognár

10 August 2019 2	Diósgyőr	1 – 2	Újpest	Miskolc
19:30 CEST	Tajti 38'	Report	Zsótér 14'; Nwobodo 48'	Stadium: Diósgyőri Stadion; Attendance: 6,518; Referee: Ádám Farkas

17 August 2019 3	Fehérvár	5 – 1	Diósgyőr	Székesfehérvár
19:30 CEST	Elek 13'; Futács 53'; Juhász 73'; Hodžić 75', 85'	Report	Prosser 1'	Stadium: MOL Aréna Sóstó; Attendance: 3,586; Referee: Gergő Bogár

24 August 2019 4	Diósgyőr	0 – 3	Mezőkövesd	Miskolc
18:00 CEST		Report	Nagy 51'; Karnitsky 56'; Cseri 66'	Stadium: Diósgyőri Stadion; Attendance: 4,853; Referee: Sándor Andó-Szabó

1 September 2019 5	Ferencváros	1 – 0	Diósgyőr	Budapest
18:00 CEST	Signevich 37'	Report		Stadium: Groupama Arena; Attendance: 8,055; Referee: Tamás Bognár

14 September 2019 6	Diósgyőr	1 – 0	Zalaegerszeg	Miskolc
17:00 CEST	Brković 38'	Report		Stadium: Diósgyőri Stadion; Attendance: 2,961; Referee: Zoltán Iványi

28 September 2019 7	Kaposvár	2 – 0	Diósgyőr	Kaposvár
17:00 CEST	T. Nagy 20'; Szakály 54'	Report		Stadium: Rákóczi Stadion; Attendance: 1,100; Referee: Balázs Berke

5 October 2019 8	Diósgyőr	1 – 1	Puskás Akadémia	Miskolc
17:00 CEST	Shestakov 77'	Report	Vlasko 90+2'	Stadium: Diósgyőri Stadion; Attendance: 2,302; Referee: József Erdős

19 October 2019 9	Debrecen	2 – 1	Diósgyőr	Debrecen
17:00 CEST	Szécsi 9'; Tőzsér 65' (pen.)	Report	Márkvárt 47'	Stadium: Nagyerdei Stadion; Attendance: 5,460; Referee: Gergő Bogár

26 October 2019 10	Paks	1 – 2	Diósgyőr	Paks
17:00 CEST	Könyves 59'	Report	Ivanovski 14'; Iszlai 64' (pen.)	Stadium: Fehérvári úti Stadion; Attendance: 1,397; Referee: Viktor Kassai

2 November 2019 11	Diósgyőr	3 – 1	Kisvárda	Miskolc
17:00 CET	Shestakov 3'; Iszlai 62' (pen.); Rui Pedro 90' (pen.)	Report	Bumba 51'	Stadium: Diósgyőri Stadion; Attendance: 4,268; Referee: Balázs Berke

9 November 2019 12	Budapest Honvéd	1 – 0	Diósgyőr	Budapest
19:30 CET	Lanzafame 29'	Report		Stadium: Hidegkuti Nándor Stadion; Attendance: 2,669; Referee: Csaba Pintér

23 November 2019 13	Újpest	0 – 2	Diósgyőr	Budapest
19:30 CET		Report	Márkvárt 23'; Tabaković 32'	Stadium: Illovszky Rudolf Stadion; Attendance: 2,496; Referee: Sándor Andó-Szabó

30 November 2019 14	Diósgyőr	1 – 3	Fehérvár	Miskolc
19:30 CET	Bacsa 42'	Report	Stopira 6'; Kovács 46'; Nikolov 86'	Stadium: Diósgyőri Stadion; Attendance: 3,964; Referee: Balázs Berke

7 December 2019 15	Mezőkövesd	0 – 1	Diósgyőr	Mezőkövesd
14:30 CET		Report	Rui Pedro 89'	Stadium: Mezőkövesdi Városi Stadion; Attendance: 2,656; Referee: Zoltán Iványi

15 December 2019 16	Diósgyőr	0 – 1	Ferencváros	Miskolc
18:00 CET		Report	Zubkov 15'	Stadium: Diósgyőri Stadion; Attendance: 8,311; Referee: Ádám Farkas

25 January 2020 17	Zalaegerszeg	1 – 3	Diósgyőr	Zalaegerszeg
17:00 CET	G. Bobál 47' (pen.)	Report	Brković 53'; Polgár 61'; Hasani 90+2'	Stadium: ZTE Arena; Attendance: 2,051; Referee: Ferenc Karakó

1 February 2020 18	Diósgyőr	2 – 0	Kaposvár	Miskolc
17:00 CET	Brković 20'; Fodor 22' (o.g.)	Report		Stadium: Diósgyőri Stadion; Attendance: 3,702; Referee: Péter Solymosi

5 February 2020 19	Puskás Akadémia	2 – 2	Diósgyőr	Felcsút
18:00 CET	Knežević 50'; Hegedűs 90+2'	Report	Iszlai 58' (pen.); Molnár 70'	Stadium: Pancho Aréna; Attendance: 785; Referee: Ádám Farkas

8 February 2020 20	Diósgyőr	1 – 2	Debrecen	Miskolc
17:00 CET	Ivanovski 4'	Report	Adeniji 14'; Kinyik 16'	Stadium: DVTK Stadion; Attendance: 4,802; Referee: Zoltán Iványi

15 February 2020 21	Diósgyőr	2 – 0	Paks	Miskolc
17:00 CET	Ivanovski 28'; Hasani 78'	Report		Stadium: DVTK Stadion; Attendance: 3,245; Referee: István Vad

22 February 2020 22	Kisvárda	2 – 2	Diósgyőr	Kisvárda
17:00 CET	Tsoukalas 23'; Melnyk 76'	Report	Molnár 70'; Egerszegi 89'	Stadium: Várkerti Stadion; Attendance: 2,512; Referee: Tamás Bognár

29 February 2020 23	Budapest Honvéd	0 – 4	Diósgyőr	Budapest
17:00 CET		Report	Hasani 46'; Ivanovski 71'; Molnár 79'; Iszlai 84' (pen.)	Stadium: Hidegkuti Nándor Stadion; Attendance: 2,520; Referee: Gergő Bogár

7 March 2020 24	Diósgyőr	2 – 1	Újpest	Miskolc
17:00 CET	Ivanovski 7'; Rui Pedro 59'	Report	Novothny 90+2'	Stadium: DVTK Stadion; Attendance: 8,376; Referee: József Erdős

14 March 2020 25	Fehérvár	1 – 1	Diósgyőr	Székesfehérvár
19:30 CET	Négo 88'	Report	Tabaković 90'	Stadium: MOL Aréna Sóstó; Attendance: x Referee: Balázs Berke

30 May 2020 26	Diósgyőr	1 – 0	Mezőkövesd	Miskolc
19:00 CEST	Iszlai 83'	Report		Stadium: Diósgyőri Stadion; Attendance: 2,255; Referee: Zoltán Iványi

7 June 2020 27	Ferencváros	3 – 0	Diósgyőr	Budapest
21:05 CEST	Boli 54'; Zubkov 55'; Botka 82'	Report		Stadium: Groupama Arena; Attendance: 2,725; Referee: Ferenc Karakó

10 June 2020 28	Diósgyőr	1 – 1	Zalaegerszeg	Miskolc
16:55 CEST	Szépe 68' (o.g.)	Report	Bolla 80'	Stadium: Diósgyőri Stadion; Attendance: 2,895; Referee: József Erdős

14 June 2020 29	Kaposvár	3 – 0	Diósgyőr	Kaposvár
19:00 CEST	Bévárdi 7'; R. Nagy 48' (pen.); J. Nagy 89'	Report		Stadium: Rákóczi Stadion; Attendance: 850; Referee: Balázs Berke

17 June 2020 30	Diósgyőr	1 – 2	Puskás Akadémia	Miskolc
19:00 CEST	Ivanovski 3'	Report	Deutsch 21'; Vaněček 48'	Stadium: Diósgyőri Stadion; Attendance: 2,910; Referee: Ferenc Karakó

21 June 2020 31	Debrecen	4 – 0	Diósgyőr	Debrecen
21:05 CEST	Szécsi 8', 14'; Szatmári 44'; Tőzsér 71' (pen.)	Report		Stadium: Nagyerdei Stadion; Attendance: 4,650; Referee: Tamás Bognár

24 June 2020 32	Paks	4 – 2	Diósgyőr	Paks
21:05 CEST	Windecker 17', 74'; Gévay 49'; Hahn 56'	Report	Iszlai 60' (pen.); Molnár 90'	Stadium: Fehérvári úti Stadion; Attendance: 1,891; Referee: Gergő Bogár

27 June 2020 33	Diósgyőr	0 – 2	Kisvárda	Miskolc
17:30 CEST		Report	Obradović 8'; Viana 42'	Stadium: Diósgyőri Stadion; Attendance: 5,683; Referee: István Vad

=== Hungarian Cup ===
21 September 2019 6th round	Érd	0 – 1	Diósgyőr	Érd
15:00 CEST		Report	Hasani 72'	Stadium: Érdi Sporttelep; Attendance: 500; Referee: Tibor Horváth

30 October 2019 7th round	Dabas	0 – 3	Diósgyőr	Dabas
12:30 CET		Report	Brković 15'; Hasani 34'; Szabó 55'	Stadium: Városi Sporttelep; Attendance: 200; Referee: Péter Zierkelbach

3 December 2019 Round of 32	MTK Budapest	1 – 0 (a.e.t.)	Diósgyőr	Budapest
17:00 CET	Schön 98'	Report		Stadium: Hidegkuti Nándor Stadion; Attendance: 1,882; Referee: Gábor Barna

== Statistics ==
=== Appearances and goals ===
Last updated on 27 June 2020.

No.	Pos	Nat	Player	Total		OTP Bank Liga		Hungarian Cup	
No.	Pos	Nat	Player	Apps	Goals	Apps	Goals	Apps	Goals
1	GK	(Hungary) HUN	Erik Bukrán	2	-6	2	-6	0	0
7	FW	(Hungary) HUN	Gábor Makrai	4	0	4	0	0	0
8	MF	(Kosovo) KOS	Florent Hasani	36	5	33	3	3	2
9	MF	(Hungary) HUN	Tamás Kiss	16	0	16	0	0	0
10	FW	(Switzerland) SUI	Haris Tabaković	21	2	20	2	1	0
11	FW	(Colombia) COL	José Cortés	10	0	10	0	0	0
12	FW	(North Macedonia) MKD	Mirko Ivanovski	25	6	23	6	2	0
14	MF	(Hungary) HUN	Dávid Márkvárt	34	2	31	2	3	0
15	DF	(Hungary) HUN	András Vági	27	0	25	0	2	0
16	FW	(Hungary) HUN	Gábor Molnár	15	4	15	4	0	0
17	DF	(Ukraine) UKR	Serhiy Shestakov	27	3	26	3	1	0
22	MF	(Hungary) HUN	Tamás Egerszegi	10	1	10	1	0	0
25	DF	(Serbia) SRB	Dušan Brković	26	4	24	3	2	1
26	MF	(Hungary) HUN	Kornél Szűcs	6	0	5	0	1	0
27	DF	(Albania) ALB	Hysen Memolla	5	0	5	0	0	0
28	MF	(Portugal) POR	Rui Pedro	27	3	26	3	1	0
33	DF	(Hungary) HUN	Kristóf Polgár	35	1	32	1	3	0
44	GK	(Serbia) SRB	Branislav Danilović	31	-43	30	-43	1	0
48	DF	(Hungary) HUN	Dejan Karan	13	0	12	0	1	0
70	FW	(Hungary) HUN	Kristóf Korbély	19	0	18	0	1	0
74	MF	(Hungary) HUN	Patrik Ternován	2	0	2	0	0	0
88	MF	(Ghana) GHA	Joachim Adukor	7	0	7	0	0	0
90	MF	(Hungary) HUN	Bence Iszlai	29	6	26	6	3	0
92	DF	(Hungary) HUN	Donát Orosz	6	0	5	0	1	0
97	FW	(Hungary) HUN	Gábor Boros	1	0	1	0	0	0
99	GK	(Hungary) HUN	Botond Antal	3	-4	1	-3	2	-1
Youth players:
18	MF	(Hungary) HUN	Borisz Tóth	0	0	0	0	0	0
31	DF	(Hungary) HUN	Marcell Farkas	0	0	0	0	0	0
75	DF	(Hungary) HUN	Marcell Orosz	2	0	0	0	2	0
Out to loan:
22	MF	(Hungary) HUN	Barnabás Tóth	3	0	3	0	0	0
47	FW	(Hungary) HUN	Richárd Zsolnai	3	0	1	0	2	0
Players no longer at the club:
4	DF	(Hungary) HUN	Márk Tamás	20	0	17	0	3	0
6	MF	(Hungary) HUN	Mátyás Tajti	4	2	4	2	0	0
9	MF	(Hungary) HUN	Patrik Bacsa	11	1	9	1	2	0
11	DF	(Slovakia) SVK	Martin Juhar	2	0	2	0	0	0
20	MF	(Hungary) HUN	Bence Szabó	11	1	8	0	3	1
27	FW	(Hungary) HUN	Dániel Prosser	19	1	16	1	3	0
29	DF	(Cameroon) CMR	Yannick Ndzouma	1	0	1	0	0	0

=== Top scorers ===
Includes all competitive matches. The list is sorted by shirt number when total goals are equal.

Last updated on 27 June 2020

Position	Nation	Number	Name	OTP Bank Liga	Hungarian Cup	Total
1	(North Macedonia)	12	Mirko Ivanovski	6	0	6
2	(Hungary)	90	Bence Iszlai	6	0	6
3	(Kosovo)	8	Florent Hasani	3	2	5
4	(Hungary)	16	Gábor Molnár	4	0	4
5	(Serbia)	25	Dušan Brković	3	1	4
6	(Ukraine)	17	Serhiy Shestakov	3	0	3
7	(Portugal)	28	Rui Pedro	3	0	3
8	(Hungary)	6	Mátyás Tajti	2	0	2
9	(Hungary)	14	Dávid Márkvárt	2	0	2
10	(Switzerland)	10	Haris Tabaković	2	0	2
11	(Ukraine)	27	Dániel Prosser	1	0	1
12	(Hungary)	9	Patrik Bacsa	1	0	1
13	(Hungary)	33	Kristóf Polgár	1	0	1
14	(Hungary)	22	Tamás Egerszegi	1	0	1
15	(Hungary)	20	Bence Szabó	0	1	1
/	/	/	Own Goals	2	0	2
			TOTALS	40	4	44

=== Disciplinary record ===
Includes all competitive matches. Players with 1 card or more included only.

Last updated on 27 June 2020

Position	Nation	Number	Name	OTP Bank Liga		Hungarian Cup		Total (Hu Total)	
Position	Nation	Number	Name	Booked	Sent off (straight red)	Booked	Sent off (straight red)	Booked	Sent off (straight red)
GK	(Hungary)	1	Erik Bukrán	1	0	0	0	1 (1)	0 (0)
DF	(Hungary)	4	Márk Tamás	5	0	0	0	5 (5)	0 (0)
MF	(Hungary)	6	Mátyás Tajti	1	0	0	0	1 (1)	0 (0)
MF	(Kosovo)	8	Florent Hasani	3	0	0	0	3 (3)	0 (0)
MF	(Hungary)	9	Tamás Kiss	5	0	0	0	5 (5)	0 (0)
MF	(Hungary)	9	Patrik Bacsa	2	0	0	0	2 (2)	0 (0)
FW	(Switzerland)	10	Haris Tabaković	2	0	0	0	2 (2)	0 (0)
FW	(Colombia)	11	José Cortés	1	0	0	0	1 (1)	0 (0)
FW	(North Macedonia)	12	Mirko Ivanovski	4	1	0	0	4 (4)	1 (1)
MF	(Hungary)	14	Dávid Márkvárt	4	0	1	0	5 (4)	0 (0)
DF	(Hungary)	15	András Vági	4	0	0	0	4 (4)	0 (0)
FW	(Hungary)	16	Gábor Molnár	1	0	0	0	1 (1)	0 (0)
DF	(Ukraine)	17	Serhiy Shestakov	4	0	0	0	4 (4)	0 (0)
MF	(Hungary)	20	Bence Szabó	2	0	0	0	2 (2)	0 (0)
MF	(Hungary)	22	Barnabás Tóth	1	0	0	0	1 (1)	0 (0)
DF	(Serbia)	25	Dušan Brković	5	1	0	0	5 (5)	1 (1)
MF	(Portugal)	28	Rui Pedro	6	0	0	0	6 (6)	0 (0)
DF	(Cameroon)	29	Yannick Ndzoumou	1	0	0	0	1 (1)	0 (0)
DF	(Hungary)	33	Kristóf Polgár	2	0	0	0	2 (2)	0 (0)
FW	(Hungary)	47	Richárd Zsolnai	0	0	1	0	1 (0)	0 (0)
DF	(Serbia)	48	Dejan Karan	5	0	0	0	5 (5)	0 (0)
FW	(Hungary)	70	Kristóf Korbély	3	0	0	0	3 (3)	0 (0)
MF	(Hungary)	74	Patrik Ternován	1	0	0	0	1 (1)	0 (0)
DF	(Hungary)	75	Marcell Orosz	0	0	1	0	1 (0)	0 (0)
MF	(Hungary)	90	Bence Iszlai	9	0	1	0	10 (9)	0 (0)
DF	(Hungary)	92	Donát Orosz	0	0	1	0	1 (0)	0 (0)
			TOTALS	72	2	5	0	77 (72)	2 (2)

=== Overall ===
Games played	36 (33 OTP Bank Liga and 3 Hungarian Cup)
Games won	14 (12 OTP Bank Liga and 2 Hungarian Cup)
Games drawn	5 (5 OTP Bank Liga and 0 Hungarian Cup)
Games lost	17 (16 OTP Bank Liga and 1 Hungarian Cup)
Goals scored	44
Goals conceded	53
Goal difference	-9
Yellow cards	77
Red cards	2
Worst discipline	(Hungary) Bence Iszlai (10 (yellow card) , 0 (red card) )
Best result	4–0 (A) v Budapest Honvéd - Nemzeti Bajnokság I - 29-02-2020
Worst result	1–5 (A) v Fehérvár - Nemzeti Bajnokság I - 17-08-2019
Worst result	0–4 (A) v Debrecen - Nemzeti Bajnokság I - 21-06-2020
Most appearances	(Kosovo) Florent Hasani (36 appearances)
Top scorer	(North Macedonia) Mirko Ivanovski (6 goals)
Top scorer	(Hungary) Bence Iszlai (6 goals)
Points	47/108 (43.51%)

Last updated: 27 June 2020

=== Attendances ===
As of 8 December 2019

	Matches	Attendances	High	Low	Average
Nemzeti Bajnokság I	6	31,006	6,518	2,302	4,429
Magyar Kupa	not played at home				
Total	9	115,968	19,356	6,891	12,885
