= 2018–19 Diósgyőri VTK season =

Diósgyőri VTK
2018–19 season
- Chairman: (Hungary) Gergely Sántha
- Manager: (Spain) Fernando
- NB 1: 10th
- Hungarian Cup: Round of 32
- Top goalscorer: League: Richárd Vernes (7); Florent Hasani (7); All: Richárd Vernes (9)
- Highest home attendance: 12,203 vs Újpest (19 May 2019)
- Lowest home attendance: 2,070 vs MTK Budapest (24 November 2018)
Home colours	Away colours	Third colours

The 2018–19 season will be Diósgyőri VTK's 53rd competitive season, 8th consecutive season in the OTP Bank Liga and 108th year in existence as a football club.

== First team squad ==
Note: Flags indicate national team as defined under FIFA eligibility rules; some limited exceptions apply. Players may hold more than one non-FIFA nationality.

No.	Pos.	Nation	Player
1	GK	HUN	Erik Bukrán
4	DF	HUN	Márk Tamás
6	MF	HUN	Mátyás Tajti
7	FW	HUN	Gábor Makrai
8	MF	KOS	Florent Hasani
9	FW	HUN	Patrik Bacsa
10	FW	HUN	Richárd Vernes
11	DF	SVK	Martin Juhar
14	MF	HUN	Dávid Márkvárt
15	MF	HUN	Barnabás Tóth
17	DF	UKR	Serhiy Shestakov
18	MF	HUN	Borisz Tóth
20	MF	HUN	Bence Szabó

No.	Pos.	Nation	Player
21	DF	HUN	Tamás Géringer
22	GK	CRO	Ivan Radoš
23	MF	HUN	Dávid Forgács
25	DF	SRB	Dušan Brković
28	MF	CRO	Tomislav Mazalović
33	DF	HUN	Kristóf Polgár
48	DF	SRB	Dejan Karan
50	DF	HUN	Bence Bárdos
81	DF	HUN	Patrik Ivánka
91	FW	SRB	Branko Mihajlović
94	DF	HUN	Gábor Eperjesi
99	GK	HUN	Botond Antal

== Transfers ==
=== Summer ===
In: Note: Flags indicate national team as defined under FIFA eligibility rules; some limited exceptions apply. Players may hold more than one non-FIFA nationality.

No.	Pos.	Nation	Player
6	MF	HUN	Mátyás Tajti (from (Spain) Atlético Malagueño)
10	FW	HUN	Richárd Vernes (from Zalaegerszeg)
11	MF	SVK	Martin Juhar (from (Czech Republic) Zbrojovka Brno)
14	MF	HUN	Dávid Márkvárt (from Puskás Akadémia)
20	MF	HUN	Bence Szabó (loan from Videoton)
24	FW	ROU	István Fülöp (loan return from (Romania) Sepsi)
28	MF	CRO	Tomislav Mazalović (from (Croatia) Inter Zaprešić)
33	DF	HUN	Kristóf Polgár (from Szombathelyi Haladás)
79	FW	HUN	József Varga (from Diósgyőr U-19)
91	FW	SRB	Branko Mihajlović (from (Israel) Hapoel Petah Tikva)
—	MF	HUN	Balázs Szabó (loan return from Siófok)
—	FW	HUN	Gábor Boros (loan return from Kazincbarcika)

Out: Note: Flags indicate national team as defined under FIFA eligibility rules; some limited exceptions apply. Players may hold more than one non-FIFA nationality.

No.	Pos.	Nation	Player
6	MF	ESP	Diego Vela
10	FW	HUN	Roland Ugrai (to (Greece) Atromitos)
11	MF	HUN	Balázs Szabó (loan to Balmazújváros)
14	FW	HUN	Zsolt Óvári (loan to Balmazújváros)
16	FW	GRE	Nikolaos Ioannidis (to (Portugal) Marítimo)
20	MF	HUN	Attila Busai
21	DF	HUN	Gergő Kocsis (loan return to (Slovakia) Dunajská Streda)
24	FW	ROU	István Fülöp (to (Romania) Sepsi)
27	FW	SVK	Ákos Szarka (to Gyirmót)
74	MF	HUN	Patrik Ternován (loan to Balmazújváros)
—	FW	HUN	Gábor Boros (loan to Budafok)

=== Winter ===
In: Note: Flags indicate national team as defined under FIFA eligibility rules; some limited exceptions apply. Players may hold more than one non-FIFA nationality.

No.	Pos.	Nation	Player
5	MF	CMR	Ismaila Ousman (from (Cameroon) AS Fortuna)
14	FW	HUN	Gábor Boros (loan return from Budafok)
21	MF	HUN	Tamás Géringer (from Diósgyőr II)
29	DF	CMR	Yannick Ndzoumou (from (Cameroon) AS Fortuna)

Out: Note: Flags indicate national team as defined under FIFA eligibility rules; some limited exceptions apply. Players may hold more than one non-FIFA nationality.

No.	Pos.	Nation	Player
5	DF	HUN	Zoltán Lipták (to Gyirmót)
19	DF	HUN	Tibor Nagy
94	DF	HUN	Gábor Eperjesi (to Mezőkövesd)

== Statistics ==
=== Appearances and goals ===
Last updated on 19 May 2019.

No.	Pos	Nat	Player	Total		OTP Bank Liga		Hungarian Cup	
No.	Pos	Nat	Player	Apps	Goals	Apps	Goals	Apps	Goals
1	GK	(Hungary) HUN	Erik Bukrán	10	-20	10	-20	0	0
4	DF	(Hungary) HUN	Márk Tamás	29	0	27	0	2	0
5	MF	(Cameroon) CMR	Ismaila Ousman	1	0	1	0	0	0
6	MF	(Hungary) HUN	Mátyás Tajti	31	5	29	5	2	0
7	FW	(Hungary) HUN	Gábor Makrai	8	3	7	1	1	2
8	MF	(Kosovo) KOS	Florent Hasani	33	8	31	7	2	1
9	FW	(Hungary) HUN	Patrik Bacsa	29	1	26	1	3	0
10	FW	(Hungary) HUN	Richárd Vernes	30	9	28	7	2	2
11	MF	(Slovakia) SVK	Martin Juhar	27	1	25	1	2	0
14	MF	(Hungary) HUN	Dávid Márkvárt	27	2	24	2	3	0
15	MF	(Hungary) HUN	Barnabás Tóth	14	1	13	1	1	0
17	MF	(Ukraine) UKR	Serhiy Shestakov	29	0	29	0	0	0
18	MF	(Hungary) HUN	Borisz Tóth	4	0	1	0	3	0
20	MF	(Hungary) HUN	Bence Szabó	25	0	22	0	3	0
21	MF	(Hungary) HUN	Tamás Géringer	4	0	4	0	0	0
22	GK	(Croatia) CRO	Ivan Radoš	5	-11	2	-5	3	-6
23	DF	(Hungary) HUN	Dávid Forgács	8	0	8	0	0	0
25	DF	(Serbia) SRB	Dušan Brković	33	2	31	1	2	1
27	MF	(Hungary) HUN	Dániel Prosser	12	3	12	3	0	0
28	MF	(Croatia) CRO	Tomislav Mazalović	15	0	14	0	1	0
29	DF	(Cameroon) CMR	Yannick Ndzoumou	2	0	2	0	0	0
33	DF	(Hungary) HUN	Kristóf Polgár	15	0	12	0	3	0
48	DF	(Serbia) SRB	Dejan Karan	23	1	23	1	0	0
50	DF	(Hungary) HUN	Bence Bárdos	9	0	7	0	2	0
70	FW	(Hungary) HUN	Kristóf Korbély	3	1	3	1	0	0
91	FW	(Serbia) SRB	Branko Mihajlović	27	4	26	3	1	1
92	DF	(Hungary) HUN	Donát Orosz	2	0	1	0	1	0
94	DF	(Hungary) HUN	Gábor Eperjesi	6	0	5	0	1	0
99	GK	(Hungary) HUN	Botond Antal	21	-30	21	-30	0	0
Players no longer at the club:
5	DF	(Hungary) HUN	Zoltán Lipták	4	0	3	0	1	0
10	FW	(Hungary) HUN	Roland Ugrai	2	0	2	0	0	0
16	FW	(Greece) GRE	Nikolaos Ioannidis	5	0	5	0	0	0
19	DF	(Hungary) HUN	Tibor Nagy	4	1	2	0	2	1
20	MF	(Hungary) HUN	Attila Busai	3	0	3	0	0	0

=== Top scorers ===
Includes all competitive matches. The list is sorted by shirt number when total goals are equal.

Last updated on 19 May 2019

Position	Nation	Number	Name	OTP Bank Liga	Hungarian Cup	Total
1	(Hungary)	11	Richárd Vernes	7	2	9
2	(Kosovo)	8	Florent Hasani	7	1	8
3	(Hungary)	6	Mátyás Tajti	5	0	5
4	(Serbia)	91	Branko Mihajlović	3	1	4
5	(Hungary)	27	Dániel Prosser	3	0	3
6	(Hungary)	7	Gábor Makrai	1	2	3
7	(Hungary)	14	Dávid Márkvárt	2	0	2
8	(Serbia)	25	Dušan Brković	1	1	2
9	(Hungary)	9	Patrik Bacsa	1	0	1
10	(Hungary)	15	Barnabás Tóth	1	0	1
11	(Slovakia)	11	Martin Juhar	1	0	1
12	(Serbia)	48	Dejan Karan	1	0	1
13	(Hungary)	70	Kristóf Korbély	1	0	1
14	(Hungary)	19	Tibor Nagy	0	1	1
/	/	/	Own Goals	2	0	2
			TOTALS	35	8	43

=== Disciplinary record ===
Includes all competitive matches. Players with 1 card or more included only.

Last updated on 19 May 2019

Position	Nation	Number	Name	OTP Bank Liga		Hungarian Cup		Total (Hu Total)	
Position	Nation	Number	Name	Booked	Sent off (straight red)	Booked	Sent off (straight red)	Booked	Sent off (straight red)
GK	(Hungary)	1	Erik Bukrán	2	0	0	0	2 (2)	0 (0)
DF	(Hungary)	4	Márk Tamás	5	1	0	0	5 (5)	1 (1)
MF	(Cameroon)	5	Ismaila Ousman	1	0	0	0	1 (1)	0 (0)
MF	(Hungary)	6	Mátyás Tajti	8	0	1	0	9 (8)	0 (0)
MF	(Kosovo)	8	Florent Hasani	2	0	0	0	2 (2)	0 (0)
FW	(Hungary)	9	Patrik Bacsa	7	0	0	0	7 (7)	0 (0)
FW	(Hungary)	10	Richárd Vernes	9	0	0	0	9 (9)	0 (0)
MF	(Slovakia)	11	Martin Juhar	1	0	1	0	2 (1)	0 (0)
MF	(Hungary)	14	Dávid Márkvárt	7	0	2	0	9 (7)	0 (0)
MF	(Hungary)	15	Barnabás Tóth	4	0	0	0	4 (4)	0 (0)
MF	(Ukraine)	17	Serhiy Shestakov	3	0	0	0	3 (3)	0 (0)
DF	(Hungary)	19	Tibor Nagy	1	0	1	0	2 (1)	0 (0)
MF	(Hungary)	20	Bence Szabó	2	1	1	0	3 (2)	1 (1)
GK	(Croatia)	22	Ivan Radoš	1	0	0	0	1 (1)	0 (0)
DF	(Hungary)	23	Dávid Forgács	1	0	0	0	1 (1)	0 (0)
DF	(Serbia)	25	Dušan Brković	7	0	0	0	7 (7)	0 (0)
MF	(Hungary)	27	Dániel Prosser	1	0	0	0	1 (1)	0 (0)
MF	(Croatia)	28	Tomislav Mazalović	2	0	0	0	2 (2)	0 (0)
DF	(Serbia)	48	Dejan Karan	7	1	0	0	7 (7)	1 (1)
DF	(Hungary)	50	Bence Bárdos	0	0	1	0	1 (0)	0 (0)
DF	(Hungary)	94	Gábor Eperjesi	3	0	0	0	3 (3)	0 (0)
GK	(Hungary)	99	Botond Antal	1	0	0	0	1 (1)	0 (0)
			TOTALS	75	3	7	0	82 (75)	3 (3)

=== Overall ===
Games played	36 (33 OTP Bank Liga and 3 Hungarian Cup)
Games won	12 (10 OTP Bank Liga and 2 Hungarian Cup)
Games drawn	8 (8 OTP Bank Liga and 0 Hungarian Cup)
Games lost	16 (15 OTP Bank Liga and 1 Hungarian Cup)
Goals scored	44
Goals conceded	63
Goal difference	-19
Yellow cards	82
Red cards	3
Worst discipline	(Hungary) Richárd Vernes (9 (yellow card) , 0 (red card) )
Worst discipline	(Hungary) Mátyás Tajti (9 (yellow card) , 0 (red card) )
Worst discipline	(Serbia) Dejan Karan (7 (yellow card) , 1 (red card) )
Worst discipline	(Hungary) Dávid Márkvárt (9 (yellow card) , 0 (red card) )
Best result	3–0 (H) v Újpest - Nemzeti Bajnokság I - 19-05-2019
Worst result	0–7 (A) v Ferencváros - Nemzeti Bajnokság I - 02-03-2019
Most appearances	(Serbia) Dušan Brković (33 appearances)
Most appearances	(Kosovo) Florent Hasani (33 appearances)
Top scorer	(Hungary) Richárd Vernes (9 goals)
Points	43/108 (39.81%)

Last updated: 19 May 2019

== Nemzeti Bajnokság I ==
=== Matches ===
22 July 2018 1	Ferencváros	4 – 1	Diósgyőr	Budapest, Pest County
17:30 CEST	Tamás 15' (o.g.); Heister 25'; Varga 46', 69'	Report	Bacsa 45'	Stadium: Groupama Arena; Attendance: 6,920; Referee: (Hungary) Sándor Andó-Szabó

28 July 2018 2	Diósgyőr	2 – 2	Puskás Akadémia	Miskolc, Borsod-Abaúj-Zemplén County
17:00 CEST	Brković 32'; Vernes 52'	Report	Diallo 13'; Radó 19' (pen.)	Stadium: Diósgyőri Stadion; Attendance: 4,349; Referee: (Hungary) Ferenc Karakó

4 August 2018 3	Debrecen	2 – 0	Diósgyőr	Debrecen, Hajdú-Bihar County
18:00 CEST	Tőzsér 48'; Szécsi 82'	Report		Stadium: Nagyerdei Stadion; Attendance: 4,028; Referee: (Hungary) József Erdős

11 August 2018 4	MTK Budapest	1 – 0	Diósgyőr	Budapest, Pest County
19:30 CEST	Ramos 56'	Report		Stadium: Hidegkuti Nándor Stadion; Attendance: 2,178; Referee: (Hungary) Sándor Andó-Szabó

18 August 2018 5	Diósgyőr	1 – 0	Szombathelyi Haladás	Miskolc, Borsod-Abaúj-Zemplén County
19:30 CEST	Tóth 36'	Report		Stadium: Diósgyőri Stadion; Attendance: 3,023; Referee: (Hungary) Sándor Andó-Szabó

25 August 2018 6	Kisvárda	1 – 1	Diósgyőr	Kisvárda, Szabolcs-Szatmár-Bereg County
19:30 CEST	Vári 51' (pen.)	Report	Mihajlović 41'	Stadium: Várkert Sportpálya; Attendance: 2,137; Referee: (Hungary) Gergely Szőts

1 September 2018 7	Diósgyőr	0 – 0	Paks	Miskolc, Borsod-Abaúj-Zemplén County
19:30 CEST		Report		Stadium: Diósgyőri Stadion; Attendance: 3,872; Referee: (Hungary) Sándor Andó-Szabó

15 September 2018 8	Mezőkövesd	4 – 2	Diósgyőr	Mezőkövesd, Borsod-Abaúj-Zemplén County
17:00 CEST	Szeles 7'; Cseri 9'; Vayda 11', 80'	Report	Tajti 50'; Makrai 68'	Stadium: Mezőkövesdi Városi Stadion; Attendance: 2,600; Referee: (Hungary) Balázs Berke

30 September 2018 9	Diósgyőr	0 – 1	MOL Vidi	Miskolc, Borsod-Abaúj-Zemplén County
18:00 CEST		Report	Huszti 69'	Stadium: Diósgyőri Stadion; Attendance: 2,850; Referee: (Hungary) Csaba Pintér

6 October 2018 10	Budapest Honvéd	1 – 0	Diósgyőr	Budapest, Pest County
14:45 CEST	Holender 67'	Report		Stadium: Hidegkuti Nándor Stadion; Attendance: 2,069; Referee: (Hungary) Gergely Szőts

20 October 2018 11	Diósgyőr	1 – 2	Újpest	Miskolc, Borsod-Abaúj-Zemplén County
17:00 CEST	Márkvárt 58'	Report	Beridze 75', 89'	Stadium: Diósgyőri Stadion; Attendance: 3,940; Referee: (Hungary) Tamás Bognár

27 October 2018 12	Diósgyőr	1 – 4	Ferencváros	Miskolc, Borsod-Abaúj-Zemplén County
17:00 CEST	Mihajlović 71' (pen.)	Report	Böde 26', 37', 47'; Spirovski 39'	Stadium: Diósgyőri Stadion; Attendance: 7,768; Referee: (Hungary) Balázs Berke

3 November 2018 13	Puskás Akadémia	2 – 1	Diósgyőr	Felcsút, Fejér County
17:00 CET	Arabuli 79'; Hegedűs 88'	Report	Tajti 81'	Stadium: Pancho Arena; Attendance: 916; Referee: (Hungary) Csaba Pintér

10 November 2018 14	Diósgyőr	1 – 0	Debrecen	Miskolc, Borsod-Abaúj-Zemplén County
14:30 CET	Hasani 38'	Report		Stadium: DVTK Stadion; Attendance: 2,553; Referee: (Hungary) Zoltán Iványi

24 November 2018 15	Diósgyőr	3 – 2	MTK Budapest	Miskolc, Borsod-Abaúj-Zemplén County
19:30 CET	Balogh 13' (o.g.); Hasani 41'; Vernes 74'	Report	Farkas 81'; Torghelle 90+5' (pen.)	Stadium: DVTK Stadion; Attendance: 2,070; Referee: (Hungary) József Erdős

1 December 2018 16	Szombathelyi Haladás	1 – 1	Diósgyőr	Szombathely, Vas County
17:00 CET	Habovda 71'	Report	Hasani 65'	Stadium: Haladás Sportkomplexum; Attendance: 2,214; Referee: (Hungary) Sándor Andó-Szabó

8 December 2018 17	Diósgyőr	1 – 1	Kisvárda	Miskolc, Borsod-Abaúj-Zemplén County
17:00 CET	Juhar 14'	Report	Sassá 32'	Stadium: DVTK Stadion; Attendance: 2,214; Referee: (Hungary) Balázs Berke

15 December 2018 18	Paks	1 – 2	Diósgyőr	Paks, Tolna County
17:00 CET	Papp 17'	Report	Tajti 15'; Hasani 63'	Stadium: Fehérvári úti Stadion; Attendance: 250; Referee: (Hungary) Ádám Németh

2 February 2019 19	Diósgyőr	1 – 1	Mezőkövesd	Miskolc, Borsod-Abaúj-Zemplén County
17:00 CET	Vernes 90+4'	Report	Molnár 52'	Stadium: DVTK Stadion; Attendance: 3,408; Referee: (Hungary) Gergely Szőts

9 February 2019 20	MOL Vidi	1 – 2	Diósgyőr	Székesfehérvár, Fejér County
17:00 CET	Šćepović 4'	Report	Mihajlović 28'; Karan 33'	Stadium: MOL Aréna Sóstó; Attendance: 2,540; Referee: (Hungary) Csaba Pintér

16 February 2019 21	Diósgyőr	2 – 1	Budapest Honvéd	Miskolc, Borsod-Abaúj-Zemplén County
17:00 CET	Vernes 62'; Prosser 75'	Report	Danilo 15'	Stadium: DVTK Stadion; Attendance: 5,026; Referee: (Hungary) Ádám Németh

23 February 2019 22	Újpest	5 – 0	Diósgyőr	Budapest, Pest County
17:00 CET	Nwobodo 5'; Nagy 48'; Bureković 70'; Novothny 86'; Zsótér 90'	Report		Stadium: Szusza Ferenc Stadion; Attendance: 2,767; Referee: (Hungary) István Vad

2 March 2019 23	Ferencváros	7 – 0	Diósgyőr	Budapest, Pest County
19:30 CET	Gorriarán 27'; Varga 33' (pen.), 56'; Signevich 42', 59'; Lanzafame 84' (pen.), 86'	Report		Stadium: Groupama Arena; Attendance: 9,437; Referee: (Hungary) Tamás Bognár

9 March 2019 24	Diósgyőr	1 – 0	Puskás Akadémia	Miskolc, Borsod-Abaúj-Zemplén County
17:00 CET	Hasani 63'	Report		Stadium: DVTK Stadion; Attendance: 3,837; Referee: (Hungary) Ferenc Karakó

16 March 2019 25	Debrecen	1 – 0	Diósgyőr	Debrecen, Hajdú-Bihar County
19:30 CET	Szécsi 18'	Report		Stadium: Nagyerdei Stadion; Attendance: 3,600; Referee: (Hungary) Balázs Berke

30 March 2019 26	MTK Budapest	2 – 1	Diósgyőr	Budapest, Pest County
17:00 CEST	Gera 22', 77'	Report	Tajti 43'	Stadium: Hidegkuti Nándor Stadion; Attendance: 2,877; Referee: (Hungary) Sándor Andó-Szabó

6 April 2019 27	Diósgyőr	0 – 1	Szombathelyi Haladás	Miskolc, Borsod-Abaúj-Zemplén County
17:00 CEST		Report	Rui Pedro 78'	Stadium: Diósgyőri Stadion; Attendance: 4,117; Referee: (Hungary) Ádám Farkas

13 April 2019 28	Kisvárda	1 – 1	Diósgyőr	Kisvárda, Szabolcs-Szatmár-Bereg County
17:00 CEST	Seco 90+1'	Report	Lucas 20' (o.g.)	Stadium: Várkert Sportpálya; Attendance: 2,850; Referee: (Hungary) István Vad

20 April 2019 29	Diósgyőr	1 – 0	Paks	Miskolc, Borsod-Abaúj-Zemplén County
17:00 CEST	Prosser 27'	Report		Stadium: Diósgyőri Stadion; Attendance: 3,269; Referee: (Hungary) Zoltán Iványi

27 April 2019 30	Mezőkövesd	3 – 0	Diósgyőr	Mezőkövesd, Borsod-Abaúj-Zemplén County
17:00 CEST	Pekár 18'; Cseri 76'; Moutari 86'	Report		Stadium: Mezőkövesdi Városi Stadion; Attendance: 3,425; Referee: (Hungary) Sándor Andó-Szabó

4 May 2019 31	Diósgyőr	2 – 1	MOL Vidi	Miskolc, Borsod-Abaúj-Zemplén County
17:00 CEST	Hasani 5'; Márkvárt 73'	Report	Stopira 50'	Stadium: Diósgyőri Stadion; Attendance: 3,262; Referee: (Hungary) István Vad

11 May 2019 32	Budapest Honvéd	4 – 4	Diósgyőr	Budapest, Pest County
17:00 CEST	Kamber 19'; Danilo 39'; Ngog 72'; Lovrić 78'	Report	Prosser 42'; Vernes 49', 61', 84'	Stadium: Hidegkuti Nándor Stadion; Attendance: 2,393; Referee: (Hungary) Balázs Berke

19 May 2019 33	Diósgyőr	3 – 0	Újpest	Miskolc, Borsod-Abaúj-Zemplén County
17:00 CEST	Tajti 36'; Korbély 82'; Hasani 90+1'	Report		Stadium: Diósgyőri Stadion; Attendance: 12,203; Referee: (Hungary) Zoltán Iványi

=== League table ===
Pos	Team	Pld	W	D	L	GF	GA	GD	Pts	Qualification or relegation
8	Paks	33	9	12	12	33	46	−13	39	
9	Kisvárda	33	10	8	15	36	48	−12	38	
10	Diósgyőr	33	10	8	15	36	57	−21	38	
11	MTK (R)	33	10	4	19	42	56	−14	34	Relegation to the Nemzeti Bajnokság II
12	Haladás (R)	33	8	6	19	31	51	−20	30	Relegation to the Nemzeti Bajnokság II

Source: Hungarian Football Federation (in Hungarian), Soccerway
Rules for classification: 1) Points; 2) Matches won; 3) Goal difference; 4) Goals scored; 5) Head-to-head points; 6) Head-to-head goal difference; 7) Head-to-head away goals scored; 8) Fair play ranking; 9) Drawing of lots.
(R) Relegated

=== Results summary ===
Overall								Home						Away					
Pld	W	D	L	GF	GA	GD	Pts	W	D	L	GF	GA	GD	W	D	L	GF	GA	GD
33	10	8	15	36	57	−21	38	8	4	4	20	16	+4	2	4	11	16	41	−25

Last updated: 19 May 2019.
Source: NB1

=== Results by round ===
Round	1	2	3	4	5	6	7	8	9	10	11	12	13	14	15	16	17	18	19	20	21	22	23	24	25	26	27	28	29	30	31	32	33
Ground	A	H	A	A	H	A	H	A	H	A	H	H	A	H	H	A	H	A	H	A	H	A	A	H	A	A	H	A	H	A	H	A	H
Result	L	D	L	L	W	D	D	L	L	L	L	L	L	W	W	D	D	W	D	W	W	L	L	W	L	L	L	D	W	L	W	D	W
Position	11	11	11	11	9	9	9	10	11	11	11	11	11	10	10	10	10	10	11	11	10	10	11	10	10	10	11	11	11	11	11	10	10

Updated to match(es) played on 19 May 2019. Source: Matches
A = Away; H = Home; W = Win; D = Draw; L = Loss

== Hungarian Cup ==
23 September 2018 Round 6	ESMTK	1 – 3 (a.e.t.)	Diósgyőr	Budapest, Pest County
15:00 CEST	Nagy 21'	Report	Makrai 22', 96'; Mihajlović 114'	Stadium: ESMTK Stadion; Referee: (Hungary) Attila Molnár

30 September 2018 Round 7	Zalaegerszeg	0 – 2	Diósgyőr	Zalaegerszeg, Zala County
20:00 CET		Report	Nagy 44'; Hasani 79'	Stadium: ZTE Arena; Attendance: 2,346; Referee: (Hungary) Gergő Bogár

5 December 2018 Round of 32	Budaörs	5 – 3	Diósgyőr	Tatabánya, Komárom-Esztergom County
12:00 CET	Csiki 9'; Gyuricza 14'; Medgyes 32', 38'; Má. Sajbán 86'	Report	Vernes 62' (pen.), 90+1'; Brković 89'	Stadium: Gyula Grosics Stadion; Attendance: 450; Referee: (Hungary) Csaba Pintér
