= 2020–21 Diósgyőri VTK season =

Diósgyőri VTK
2020–21 season
- Chairman: Gergely Sántha
- Manager: Tamás Feczkó (until 8 December 2020); Gergely Geri (until 7 January 2021); Zoran Zekić
- Stadium: Diósgyőri Stadion
- NB 1: 11th (relegated)
- Hungarian Cup: round of 16
- Top goalscorer: League: Gheorghe Grozav (8); All: Gheorghe Grozav (10)
- Highest home attendance: 5,099 vs Mezőkövesd (16 August 2020)
- Lowest home attendance: 520 vs Fehérvár (9 May 2021)
Home colours	Away colours

The 2020–21 season will be Diósgyőri VTK's 55th competitive season, 10th consecutive season in the OTP Bank Liga and 110th year in existence as a football club.

== First team ==
Note: Flags indicate national team as defined under FIFA eligibility rules; some limited exceptions apply. Players may hold more than one non-FIFA nationality.

No.	Pos.	Nation	Player
1	GK	HUN	Erik Bukrán
2	DF	CRO	Alen Grgić
4	DF	GEO	Aleksandre Kalandadze
5	MF	ARG	Augusto Max
6	DF	CRO	Vinko Soldo
7	FW	HUN	Gábor Makrai
9	FW	SRB	Stefan Dražić
10	FW	ROU	Gheorghe Grozav
12	FW	ALB	Odise Roshi
14	MF	HUN	Dávid Márkvárt
16	FW	HUN	Gábor Molnár
17	DF	UKR	Serhiy Shestakov
19	DF	CRO	Luka Marin
20	MF	HUN	Máté Zsiga
22	FW	MKD	Mirko Ivanovski
23	GK	CRO	Marko Malenica

No.	Pos.	Nation	Player
25	DF	CRO	Goran Milović
26	MF	HUN	Kornél Szűcs
27	DF	ALB	Hysen Memolla
31	DF	HUN	Marcell Farkas
32	DF	EST	Artur Pikk
33	DF	HUN	Kristóf Polgár
44	GK	SRB	Branislav Danilović
48	DF	SRB	Dejan Karan
55	MF	CRO	Diego Živulić
68	DF	HUN	János Hegedűs
71	FW	CZE	David Vaněček
90	MF	HUN	Bence Iszlai
91	FW	BIH	Asmir Suljić
92	DF	HUN	Donát Orosz
97	FW	GEO	Giorgi Omarashvili
99	GK	HUN	Botond Antal

== Transfers ==
=== Summer ===
In: Note: Flags indicate national team as defined under FIFA eligibility rules; some limited exceptions apply. Players may hold more than one non-FIFA nationality.

No.	Pos.	Nation	Player
4	DF	GEO	Aleksandre Kalandadze (from (Georgia (country)) Dinamo Tbilisi)
5	MF	ARG	Augusto Max (from (Greece) Volos)
10	FW	ROU	Gheorghe Grozav (from Kisvárda)
20	MF	HUN	Máté Zsiga (from Diósgyőr U-19)
21	FW	SRB	Stefan Dražić (from (China) Changchun Yatai)
21	MF	HUN	Tamás Géringer (loan return from Kazincbarcika)
22	MF	HUN	Barnabás Tóth (loan return from Tiszakécske)
47	FW	HUN	Richárd Zsolnai (loan return from Budafok)
68	DF	HUN	János Hegedűs (from Puskás Akadémia)
97	FW	GEO	Giorgi Omarashvili (from (Georgia (country)) Dinamo Tbilisi)
—	MF	HUN	Tamás Kispál (from Diósgyőr U-19)

Out: Note: Flags indicate national team as defined under FIFA eligibility rules; some limited exceptions apply. Players may hold more than one non-FIFA nationality.

No.	Pos.	Nation	Player
9	MF	HUN	Tamás Kiss (loan return to Puskás Akadémia)
10	FW	SUI	Haris Tabaković (to Austria Lustenau)
14	MF	HUN	Zsolt Óvári (to Pécs)
21	DF	HUN	Tamás Géringer (loan to Balatonfüred)
22	MF	HUN	Barnabás Tóth (to Dorog)
22	MF	HUN	Tamás Egerszegi (loan return to Paks)
25	DF	SRB	Dušan Brković (to (Serbia) Radnik Surdulica)
47	DF	HUN	Richárd Zsolnai (loan to Ajka)
50	DF	HUN	Bence Bárdos (loan to Szolnok)
74	MF	HUN	Patrik Ternován (to Tiszakécske)
75	DF	HUN	Marcell Orosz (loan to DEAC)
88	MF	GHA	Joachim Adukor (to (Bosnia and Herzegovina) Sarajevo)
97	FW	HUN	Gábor Boros (to Eger)

=== Winter ===
In: Note: Flags indicate national team as defined under FIFA eligibility rules; some limited exceptions apply. Players may hold more than one non-FIFA nationality.

No.	Pos.	Nation	Player
2	DF	CRO	Alen Grgić (loan from (Croatia) Osijek)
6	DF	CRO	Vinko Soldo (loan from (Croatia) Dinamo Zagreb)
12	FW	ALB	Odise Roshi (loan from (Russia) Akhmat Grozny)
19	DF	CRO	Luka Marin (loan from (Croatia) Osijek II)
23	GK	CRO	Marko Malenica (loan from (Croatia) Osijek)
25	DF	CRO	Goran Milović (from (Slovenia) Olimpija Ljubljana)
32	DF	EST	Artur Pikk (from (Finland) KuPS)
55	MF	CRO	Diego Živulić (from (Poland) Śląsk Wrocław)
71	FW	CZE	David Vaněček (from Puskás Akadémia)
91	FW	BIH	Asmir Suljić (from (Israel) Maccabi Petah Tikva)

Out: Note: Flags indicate national team as defined under FIFA eligibility rules; some limited exceptions apply. Players may hold more than one non-FIFA nationality.

No.	Pos.	Nation	Player
8	MF	KOS	Florent Hasani (to (Israel) Hapoel Kfar Saba)
11	FW	COL	José Cortés (released)
15	DF	HUN	András Vági (loan to Paks)
28	MF	POR	Rui Pedro (to Mezőkövesd)
70	DF	HUN	Kristóf Korbély (loan to Kazincbarcika)

=== Nemzeti Bajnokság I ===
==== League table ====
Pos	Team	Pld	W	D	L	GF	GA	GD	Pts	Qualification or relegation
8	Mezőkövesd	33	11	9	13	40	46	−6	42	
9	Zalaegerszeg	33	10	7	16	58	58	0	37	
10	Honvéd	33	9	10	14	46	48	−2	37	
11	Diósgyőr (R)	33	9	6	18	34	53	−19	33	Relegation to the Nemzeti Bajnokság II
12	Budafok (R)	33	7	6	20	34	74	−40	27	Relegation to the Nemzeti Bajnokság II

Source: Hungarian Football Federation (in Hungarian), Soccerway
Rules for classification: 1) Points; 2) Matches won; 3) Goal difference; 4) Goals scored; 5) Head-to-head points; 6) Head-to-head goal difference; 7) Head-to-head away goals scored; 8) Fair play ranking; 9) Drawing of lots.
(R) Relegated

==== Results summary ====
Overall								Home						Away					
Pld	W	D	L	GF	GA	GD	Pts	W	D	L	GF	GA	GD	W	D	L	GF	GA	GD
33	9	6	18	34	53	−19	33	5	6	6	22	26	−4	4	0	12	12	27	−15

Last updated: 15 May 2021.
Source: NB1

==== Results by round ====
Round	1	2	3	4	5	6	7	8	9	10	11	12	13	14	15	16	17	18	19	20	21	22	23	24	25	26	27	28	29	30	31	32	33
Ground	H	A	H	H	A	H	A	H	A	H	A	A	H	A	A	H	A	H	A	H	A	A	H	A	H	H	A	H	A	H	A	H	H
Result	W	W	D	L	L	L	L	W	L	W	L	L	L	L	L	L	L	D	L	W	L	W	D	L	D	D	L	L	W	W	W	D	L
Position	2	2	2	5	8	8	12	7	9	6	7	9	10	12	12	12	12	12	12	12	12	12	12	12	12	12	12	12	12	11	11	11	11

Updated to match(es) played on 15 May 2021. Source: Matches
A = Away; H = Home; W = Win; D = Draw; L = Loss

==== Matches ====
15 August 2020 1	Diósgyőr	2 – 1	Mezőkövesd	Miskolc
CEST	Iszlai 8' (pen.); Dražić 18'	Report	Berecz 27'	Stadium: DVTK Stadion; Attendance: 5,099; Referee: Balázs Berke

20 January 2021 2	Ferencváros	0 – 1	Diósgyőr	Budapest
20:00 CET		Report	Suljić 85'	Stadium: Groupama Arena; Attendance: no spectators Referee: Csaba Pintér

28 August 2020 3	Diósgyőr	1 – 1	MTK Budapest	Miskolc
20:00 CEST	Molnár 29'	Report	Schön 55'	Stadium: DVTK Stadion; Attendance: 4,353; Referee: Balázs Berke

12 September 2020 4	Diósgyőr	2 – 4	Budapest Honvéd	Miskolc
17:00 CEST	Grozav 42'; Molnár 47'	Report	Zsótér 16'; Gazdag 41', 63'; Ugrai 89'	Stadium: DVTK Stadion; Attendance: 3,917; Referee: Tamás Bognár

26 September 2020 5	Zalaegerszeg	3 – 1	Diósgyőr	Zalaegerszeg
19:30 CEST	Könyves 8', 31' (pen.); Koszta 77' (pen.)	Report	Hegedűs 45'	Stadium: ZTE Arena; Attendance: 2,825; Referee: Péter Antal

3 October 2020 6	Diósgyőr	1 – 2	Paks	Miskolc
19:30 CEST	Molnár 49'	Report	Windecker 46'; Szakály 90+1'	Stadium: DVTK Stadion; Attendance: 3,052; Referee: Gergő Bogár

17 October 2020 7	Budafok	2 – 1	Diósgyőr	Budapest
14:45 CEST	Oláh 17'; Ihrig-Farkas 63'	Report	Dražić 72'	Stadium: Promontor utcai Stadion; Attendance: 1,400; Referee: Zoltán Iványi

25 October 2020 8	Diósgyőr	3 – 0	Puskás Akadémia	Miskolc
19:30 CEST	Dražić 5'; Ivanovski 18' (pen.); Grozav 38'	Report		Stadium: DVTK Stadion; Attendance: 1,730; Referee: Sándor Andó-Szabó

1 November 2020 9	Kisvárda	1 – 0	Diósgyőr	Kisvárda
18:30 CET	Sassá 61'	Report		Stadium: Várkerti Stadion; Attendance: 1,723; Referee: Gergő Bogár

6 November 2020 10	Diósgyőr	3 – 0	Újpest	Miskolc
20:00 CET		Report		Stadium: DVTK Stadion

22 November 2020 11	Fehérvár	3 – 0	Diósgyőr	Székesfehérvár
17:00 CET	Nikolić 36'; Zivzivadze 80'; Petryak 90+1' (pen.)	Report		Stadium: MOL Aréna Sóstó; Attendance: no spectators Referee: Tamás Bognár

29 November 2020 12	Mezőkövesd	2 – 1	Diósgyőr	Mezőkövesd
14:05 CET	Cseri 21' (pen.); Serderov 85'	Report	Dražić 90' (pen.)	Stadium: Városi Stadion; Attendance: no spectators Referee: Zoltán Iványi

5 December 2020 13	Diósgyőr	1 – 3	Ferencváros	Miskolc
17:00 CET	Rui Pedro 15' (pen.)	Report	Baturina 6'; Zubkov 19'; Uzuni 66'	Stadium: DVTK Stadion; Attendance: no spectators Referee: Sándor Andó-Szabó

13 December 2020 14	MTK Budapest	1 – 0	Diósgyőr	Budapest
17:00 CET	Kata 90+2'	Report		Stadium: Hidegkuti Nándor Stadion; Attendance: no spectators Referee: Gergő Bogár

16 December 2020 15	Budapest Honvéd	5 – 1	Diósgyőr	Budapest
18:00 CET	Gazdag 24', 71'; Zsótér 30'; Szendrei 63'; Lovrić 75'	Report	Grozav 50'	Stadium: Hidegkuti Nándor Stadion; Attendance: no spectators Referee: Csaba Pintér

19 December 2020 16	Diósgyőr	1 – 3	Zalaegerszeg	Miskolc
17:00 CET	Iszlai 78' (pen.)	Report	Zimonyi 16', 65'; Szánthó 43'	Stadium: DVTK Stadion; Attendance: no spectators Referee: Gergő Bogár

24 January 2021 17	Paks	2 – 1	Diósgyőr	Paks
15:45 CET	Papp 32'; Grozav 45' (o.g.)	Report	Ivanovski 70'	Stadium: Fehérvári úti Stadion; Attendance: no spectators Referee: Ferenc Karakó

31 January 2021 18	Diósgyőr	1 – 1	Budafok	Miskolc
16:15 CET	Vaněček 40'	Report	Kulcsár 90+5'	Stadium: DVTK Stadion; Attendance: no spectators Referee: Tamás Bognár

3 February 2021 19	Puskás Akadémia	2 – 0	Diósgyőr	Felcsút
16:00 CET	Kiss 24'; Plšek 53' (pen.)	Report		Stadium: Pancho Aréna; Attendance: no spectators Referee: Péter Zierkelbach

6 February 2021 20	Diósgyőr	2 – 0	Kisvárda	Miskolc
14:45 CET	Vaněček 10' (pen.); Hegedűs 40'	Report		Stadium: DVTK Stadion; Attendance: no spectators Referee: Sándor Andó-Szabó

12 February 2021 21	Újpest	1 – 0	Diósgyőr	Budapest
20:00 CET	Mitrović 61'	Report		Stadium: Szusza Ferenc Stadion; Attendance: no spectators Referee: Gergő Bogár

20 February 2021 22	Fehérvár	1 – 3	Diósgyőr	Székesfehérvár
17:00 CET	Stopira 9'	Report	Grozav 60', 61', 89'	Stadium: MOL Aréna Sóstó; Attendance: no spectators Referee: József Erdős

26 February 2021 23	Diósgyőr	2 – 2	Mezőkövesd	Miskolc
20:00 CET	Milović 15'; Ivanovski 85' (pen.)	Report	Chrien 28'; Farkaš 88'	Stadium: DVTK Stadion; Attendance: no spectators Referee: Csaba Pintér

2 March 2021 24	Ferencváros	1 – 0	Diósgyőr	Budapest
20:00 CET	Boli 77'	Report		Stadium: Groupama Arena; Attendance: no spectators Referee: Balázs Berke

5 March 2021 25	Diósgyőr	0 – 0	MTK Budapest	Miskolc
20:00 CET		Report		Stadium: DVTK Stadion; Attendance: no spectators Referee: Zoltán Iványi

13 March 2021 26	Diósgyőr	0 – 0	Budapest Honvéd	Miskolc
19:30 CET		Report		Stadium: DVTK Stadion; Attendance: no spectators Referee: Gergő Bogár

3 April 2021 27	Zalaegerszeg	2 – 0	Diósgyőr	Zalaegerszeg
17:00 CEST	Szánthó 16'; Favorov 87'	Report		Stadium: ZTE Arena; Attendance: no spectators Referee: István Vad

11 April 2021 28	Diósgyőr	1 – 4	Paks	Miskolc
14:30 CEST	Molnár 86'	Report	Hahn 10' (pen.), 16'; Sajbán 68'; Szakály 87'	Stadium: DVTK Stadion; Attendance: no spectators Referee: Csaba Pintér

16 April 2021 29	Budafok	1 – 2	Diósgyőr	Budapest
18:00 CEST	Kovács 52'	Report	Suljić 18', 57'	Stadium: Promontor utcai Stadion; Attendance: no spectators Referee: Balázs Berke

21 April 2021 30	Diósgyőr	2 – 1	Puskás Akadémia	Miskolc
17:30 CEST	Grozav 22'; Molnár 90+4'	Report	Urblík 75'	Stadium: DVTK Stadion; Attendance: no spectators Referee: István Vad

24 April 2021 31	Kisvárda	0 – 1	Diósgyőr	Kisvárda
17:00 CEST		Report	Grozav 63'	Stadium: Várkerti Stadion; Attendance: no spectators Referee: Balázs Berke

29 April 2021 32	Diósgyőr	0 – 0	Újpest	Miskolc
17:30 CEST		Report		Stadium: DVTK Stadion; Attendance: no spectators Referee: Sándor Andó-Szabó

9 May 2021 33	Diósgyőr	0 – 4	Fehérvár	Miskolc
17:30 CEST		Report	Petryak 44'; Nikolić 55', 90'; Zivzivadze 79'	Stadium: DVTK Stadion; Attendance: 520; Referee: Péter Solymosi

=== Hungarian Cup ===
7 October 2020 Round 6	Balassagyarmat	0 – 2	Diósgyőr	Balassagyarmat
14:00 CEST		Report	Grozav 6'; Hegedűs 71'	Stadium: Kövi Pál Sportközpont; Attendance: 400; Referee: Bence Csonka

29 October 2020 Round of 64	Békéscsaba	0 – 3	Diósgyőr	Békéscsaba
14:00 CET		Report	Rui Pedro 57', 89'; Omarashvili 71'	Stadium: Kórház utcai Stadion; Referee: Sándor Szilágyi

9 February 2021 Round of 32	Tarpa	0 – 3	Diósgyőr	Tarpa
13:00 CET		Report	Gál 32' (o.g.); Ivanovski 44'; Grozav 58'	Stadium: Városi Sportcentrum; Attendance: no spectators Referee: Márk Szigetvári

23 February 2021 Round of 16	Mezőkövesd	2 – 0	Diósgyőr	Mezőkövesd
17:30 CET	Rui Pedro 37'; Vutov 42'	Report		Stadium: Mezőkövesdi Városi Stadion; Attendance: no spectators Referee: Sándor Szilágyi

== Statistics ==
=== Appearances and goals ===
Last updated on 15 May 2021.

No.	Pos	Nat	Player	Total		OTP Bank Liga		Hungarian Cup	
No.	Pos	Nat	Player	Apps	Goals	Apps	Goals	Apps	Goals
2	DF	(Croatia) CRO	Alen Grgić	18	0	18	0	0	0
5	MF	(Argentina) ARG	Augusto Max	28	0	26	0	2	0
6	DF	(Croatia) CRO	Vinko Soldo	17	0	15	0	2	0
7	FW	(Hungary) HUN	Gábor Makrai	10	0	7	0	3	0
9	FW	(Serbia) SRB	Stefan Dražić	33	4	29	4	4	0
10	FW	(Romania) ROU	Gheorghe Grozav	33	10	29	8	4	2
12	FW	(Albania) ALB	Odise Roshi	12	0	11	0	1	0
14	MF	(Hungary) HUN	Dávid Márkvárt	33	0	30	0	3	0
16	FW	(Hungary) HUN	Gábor Molnár	15	5	13	5	2	0
17	DF	(Ukraine) UKR	Serhiy Shestakov	23	0	19	0	4	0
19	DF	(Croatia) CRO	Luka Marin	11	0	11	0	0	0
22	FW	(North Macedonia) MKD	Mirko Ivanovski	31	4	27	3	4	1
23	GK	(Croatia) CRO	Marko Malenica	16	-19	14	-17	2	-2
25	DF	(Croatia) CRO	Goran Milović	17	1	17	1	0	0
26	MF	(Hungary) HUN	Kornél Szűcs	18	0	15	0	3	0
27	DF	(Albania) ALB	Hysen Memolla	15	0	14	0	1	0
32	DF	(Estonia) EST	Artur Pikk	9	0	7	0	2	0
33	DF	(Hungary) HUN	Kristóf Polgár	18	0	16	0	2	0
44	GK	(Serbia) SRB	Branislav Danilović	7	-8	5	-8	2	-0
48	DF	(Serbia) SRB	Dejan Karan	14	0	12	0	2	0
55	MF	(Croatia) CRO	Diego Živulić	12	0	10	0	2	0
68	DF	(Hungary) HUN	János Hegedűs	27	3	25	2	2	1
71	FW	(Czech Republic) CZE	David Vaněček	15	2	14	2	1	0
90	MF	(Hungary) HUN	Bence Iszlai	19	2	17	2	2	0
91	FW	(Bosnia and Herzegovina) BIH	Asmir Suljić	19	3	17	3	2	0
92	DF	(Hungary) HUN	Donát Orosz	1	0	1	0	0	0
99	GK	(Hungary) HUN	Botond Antal	13	-28	13	-28	0	-0
Youth players:
1	GK	(Hungary) HUN	Erik Bukrán	0	0	0	-0	0	0
4	DF	(Georgia (country)) GEO	Aleksandre Kalandadze	1	0	0	0	1	0
20	MF	(Hungary) HUN	Máté Zsiga	3	0	0	0	3	0
22	DF	(Hungary) HUN	Balázs Zsemlye	0	0	0	0	0	0
31	DF	(Hungary) HUN	Marcell Farkas	2	0	0	0	2	0
97	FW	(Georgia (country)) GEO	Giorgi Omarashvili	1	1	0	0	1	1
Out to loan:
70	FW	(Hungary) HUN	Kristóf Korbély	6	0	5	0	1	0
Players no longer at the club:
8	MF	(Kosovo) KOS	Florent Hasani	16	0	15	0	1	0
11	FW	(Colombia) COL	José Cortés	0	0	0	0	0	0
15	DF	(Hungary) HUN	András Vági	6	0	5	0	1	0
28	MF	(Portugal) POR	Rui Pedro	16	3	15	1	1	2

=== Top scorers ===
Includes all competitive matches. The list is sorted by shirt number when total goals are equal.

Last updated on 15 May 2021

Position	Nation	Number	Name	OTP Bank Liga	Hungarian Cup	Total
1	(Romania)	10	Gheorghe Grozav	8	2	10
2	(Hungary)	16	Gábor Molnár	5	0	5
3	(Serbia)	9	Stefan Dražić	4	0	4
4	(North Macedonia)	22	Mirko Ivanovski	3	1	4
5	(Bosnia and Herzegovina)	91	Asmir Suljić	3	0	3
6	(Hungary)	68	János Hegedűs	2	1	3
7	(Portugal)	28	Rui Pedro	1	2	3
8	(Hungary)	90	Bence Iszlai	2	0	2
9	(Czech Republic)	71	David Vaněček	2	0	2
10	(Croatia)	25	Goran Milović	1	0	1
11	(Georgia (country))	97	Giorgi Omarashvili	0	1	1
/	/	/	Own Goals	0	1	1
			TOTALS	31	8	39

=== Disciplinary record ===
Includes all competitive matches. Players with 1 card or more included only.

Last updated on 15 May 2021

Position	Nation	Number	Name	OTP Bank Liga		Hungarian Cup		Total (Hu Total)	
Position	Nation	Number	Name	Booked	Sent off (straight red)	Booked	Sent off (straight red)	Booked	Sent off (straight red)
DF	(Croatia)	2	Alen Grgić	1	0	0	0	1 (1)	0 (0)
MF	(Argentina)	5	Augusto Max	7	0	0	0	7 (7)	0 (0)
DF	(Croatia)	6	Vinko Soldo	2	0	1	0	3 (2)	0 (0)
MF	(Kosovo)	8	Florent Hasani	4	0	0	0	4 (4)	0 (0)
FW	(Serbia)	9	Stefan Dražić	5	0	0	0	5 (5)	0 (0)
FW	(Romania)	10	Gheorghe Grozav	4	1	0	0	4 (4)	1 (1)
FW	(Albania)	12	Odise Roshi	1	0	0	0	1 (1)	0 (0)
MF	(Hungary)	14	Dávid Márkvárt	7	0	0	0	7 (7)	0 (0)
DF	(Hungary)	15	András Vági	1	0	0	0	1 (1)	0 (0)
FW	(Hungary)	16	Gábor Molnár	1	0	0	0	1 (1)	0 (0)
DF	(Ukraine)	17	Serhiy Shestakov	4	0	1	0	5 (4)	0 (0)
DF	(Croatia)	19	Luka Marin	3	0	0	0	3 (3)	0 (0)
FW	(North Macedonia)	22	Mirko Ivanovski	4	1	0	0	4 (4)	1 (1)
DF	(Croatia)	25	Goran Milović	5	0	0	0	5 (5)	0 (0)
DF	(Hungary)	26	Kornél Szűcs	3	0	0	0	3 (3)	0 (0)
DF	(Albania)	27	Hysen Memolla	1	0	0	0	1 (1)	0 (0)
MF	(Portugal)	28	Rui Pedro	2	0	0	0	2 (2)	0 (0)
DF	(Estonia)	32	Artur Pikk	3	0	1	0	4 (3)	0 (0)
DF	(Hungary)	33	Kristóf Polgár	0	1	0	0	0 (0)	1 (1)
GK	(Serbia)	44	Branislav Danilović	1	0	0	0	1 (1)	0 (0)
DF	(Serbia)	48	Dejan Karan	5	0	0	0	5 (5)	0 (0)
MF	(Croatia)	55	Diego Živulić	3	2	1	0	4 (3)	2 (2)
DF	(Hungary)	68	János Hegedűs	3	0	0	0	3 (3)	0 (0)
FW	(Czech Republic)	71	David Vaněček	2	0	0	0	2 (2)	0 (0)
MF	(Hungary)	90	Bence Iszlai	5	0	0	0	5 (5)	0 (0)
FW	(Bosnia and Herzegovina)	91	Asmir Suljić	4	0	0	0	4 (4)	0 (0)
GK	(Hungary)	99	Botond Antal	1	0	0	0	1 (1)	0 (0)
			TOTALS	82	5	4	0	86 (82)	5 (5)

=== Overall ===
Games played	37 (33 OTP Bank Liga and 4 Hungarian Cup)
Games won	12 (9 OTP Bank Liga and 3 Hungarian Cup)
Games drawn	6 (6 OTP Bank Liga and 0 Hungarian Cup)
Games lost	19 (18 OTP Bank Liga and 1 Hungarian Cup)
Goals scored	42
Goals conceded	55
Goal difference	-13
Yellow cards	86
Red cards	5
Worst discipline	(Croatia) Diego Živulić (4 (yellow card) , 2 (red card) )
Best result	3–0 (H) v Puskás Akadémia - Nemzeti Bajnokság I - 25-10-2020
Best result	3–0 (A) v Békéscsaba - Hungarian Cup - 29-10-2020
Best result	3–0 (A) v Tarpa - Hungarian Cup - 9-2-2021
Worst result	0–4 (H) v Fehérvár - Nemzeti Bajnokság I - 9-5-2021
Most appearances	(Serbia) Stefan Dražić (33 appearances)
Most appearances	(Romania) Gheorghe Grozav (33 appearances)
Most appearances	(Hungary) Dávid Márkvárt (33 appearances)
Top scorer	(Romania) Gheorghe Grozav (10 goals)
Points	42/111 (37.83%)

Last updated: 15 May 2021

=== Preseason ===
25 July 2020 Friendly	Diósgyőr	–	(Slovakia) Košice	Miskolc
18:00 CEST		[ Report]		Stadium: DVTK Stadion

1 August 2020 Friendly	Újpest	–	Diósgyőr	Budapest
15:00 CEST		[ Report]		Stadium: Szusza Ferenc Stadion

8 August 2020 Friendly	Budafok	–	Diósgyőr	Üllő
11:00 CEST		[ Report]		Stadium: Városi Sporttelep

8 August 2020 Friendly	Paks	–	Diósgyőr	Üllő
13:00 CEST		[ Report]		Stadium: Városi Sporttelep
