= Branko Mihajlović =

Serbian footballer

Branko Mihajlović Бранко Михајловић
Personal information
- Full name: Branko Mihajlović
- Date of birth: 20 February 1991 (age 35)
- Place of birth: Belgrade, SFR Yugoslavia
- Height: 1.85 m (6 ft 1 in)
- Positions: Forward; winger

Youth career
- Partizan

Senior career*
Years	Team	Apps	(Gls)
2009	Partizan	1	(0)
2009–2010	Teleoptik	16	(1)
2010–2011	Rad	0	(0)
2011	→ Lovćen Cetinje (loan)	6	(0)
2012–2014	Čukarički	38	(3)
2013–2014	→ Sinđelić Beograd (loan)	30	(14)
2014–2015	Hapoel Kfar Saba	37	(8)
2015–2016	Hapoel Petah Tikva	33	(13)
2016–2017	Hapoel Acre	35	(15)
2017–2018	Hapoel Petah Tikva	37	(10)
2018–2020	Diósgyőr	26	(3)
2020	Mačva	7	(1)
2021–2022	Alashkert	17	(1)
2022	Zvijezda 09	3	(1)
2022	Enosis Neon Paralimni	3	(0)
2023	Hajduk Divoš	2	(1)
2023–2024	OFK Žarkovo	0	(0)

International career
2010	Serbia U19	1	(0)

Managerial career
- 2024–: Smederevo (assistant)
- * Club domestic league appearances and goals as of 09:00, 22 August 2023 (UTC)

Branko Mihajlović (Serbian Cyrillic: Бранко Михајловић; born 20 February 1991) is a Serbian former professional footballer, who played as forward. He is currently assistant manager in FK Smederevo.

== Club career ==
=== Partizan ===
Mihajlović made his debut for the first team of Partizan in the last round of 2008–09 season against Čukarički. In the next season he was sent to Partizan's affiliated team Teleoptik.

=== Rad ===
He signed with Rad at the beginning of 2010–11 season. He never made his debut for the team. As a player of Rad, he was on loan to Lovćen at the half of the season.

=== Čukarički ===
In the summer 2011 Mihajlović transferred to Čukarički. In the 2011–12 season, he scored a goal in an away match against Sloga Kraljevo, on Kraljevo City Stadium, when Čukarički made a very important win and that was one step to stay in league. He scored 2 goals in 16 matches during that season.

During that season, he played on 22 league matches and scored 2 goals. He also played in two cup matches.

=== Sinđelić Beograd ===
After the promotion of Čukarički to Jelen SuperLiga, he has been loaned to Sinđelić Beograd. In the first half of 2013–14 season, he was one of the best players in Sinđelić. In the first four fixtures of the second part of season, team made one loss, and then three wins, versus leading teams in league, Mladost Lučani, Borac Čačak, and Sloga Kraljevo. Mihajlović scored goals in all of those three matches, which promoted him to the league's top scorer at that moment, with 10 goals. He ended the season with 14 scored goals, second in the league.

=== Hapoel Kfar Saba ===
Branko Mihajlović signed one year contract with Hapoel Kfar Saba in the summer 2014. He played 37 games in Liga Leumit and scored 8 goals. He also played three matches in Israel Cup. At the end of the season the club finished in the second place in the league, and secured a promotion to Israeli Premier League. Mihajlović was one of the best players in the club during that season.

=== Hapoel Petah Tikva ===
In the summer 2015, he was signed by Hapoel Petah Tikva. During that season, the club ended on 6th place in Liga Leumit and Mihajlović scored 13 goals for the club in 33 league matches.

=== Hapoel Acre ===
Mihajlović signed for Hapoel Acre in the summer 2016. During this season, he played 35 games in Liga Leumit and scored 15 goals. At the end of the season, the club finished in the second place in the league, and secured a promotion to Israeli Premier League. Mihajlović was one of the best players in the club during that season.

=== Hapoel Petah Tikva ===
Mihajlović signed for Hapoel Petah Tikva one year contract for 2017–18 season. He played 37 league matches and scored 10 goals. He also played one match in Israel State Cup. He left the club at the end of the season on free transfer.

=== Diósgyőri VTK ===
In August 2018, Mihajlović completed a move to Diósgyőri. He played 27 matches for the time in this season, and scored 4 goals in total. In February 2020 he was released from club.

=== Mačva ===
After being released from Diósgyőri VTK, he joined FK Mačva Šabac on a free transfer on February 8, 2020.

=== Alashkert ===
In February 2021, after being without a club for a few months, Mihajlović signed for Alashkert, and during his spell there he won 2020–21 Armenian Premier League and 2021 Armenian Supercup. He also played in 2021–22 UEFA Europa Conference League group stage.

=== Zvijezda 09 ===
Mihajlović joined Zvijezda 09 in March 2022. He played 3 matches and scored 1 goal in the First League of Republic of Srpska. At the end of the season he left the club.

=== Enosis Neon Paralimni ===
In the end of June 2022, Mihajlović signed for Enosis Neon Paralimni.

=== Hajduk Divoš ===
In March 2023, he joined FK Hajduk Divoš, which competes in Vojvodina League South.

=== OFK Žarkovo ===
In August 2023, he joined OFK Žarkovo, which competes in Belgrade Zone League.

== Career statistics ==
=== Club ===
As of January 2023

Club	Season	League			Cup		Continental		Other		Total	
Club	Season	Division	Apps	Goals	Apps	Goals	Apps	Goals	Apps	Goals	Apps	Goals
Partizan	2008–09	Serbian SuperLiga	1	0	0	0	0	0	–		1	0
Teleoptik	2009–10	Serbian First League	16	1	0	0	–		–		16	1
Rad	2010–11	Serbian SuperLiga	0	0	0	0	–		–		0	0
Lovćen (loan)	2010–11	Montenegrin First League	6	0	0	0	–		–		6	0
Čukarički	2011–12	Serbian First League	16	1	0	0	–		–		16	1
Čukarički	2012–13	Serbian First League	22	2	2	0	–		–		24	2
Čukarički	Total		38	3	2	0	–		–		40	3
Sinđelić (loan)	2013–14	Serbian First League	30	14	0	0	–		–		30	14
Hapoel Kfar Saba	2014–15	Liga Leumit	37	8	3	0	–		–		40	8
Hapoel Petah Tikva	2015–16	Liga Leumit	33	13	0	0	–		–		33	13
Hapoel Acre	2016–17	Liga Leumit	35	15	1	0	–		–		36	15
Hapoel Petah Tikva	2017–18	Liga Leumit	37	10	1	0	–		–		38	10
Diósgyőr	2018–19	Nemzeti Bajnokság I	26	3	1	1	–		–		27	4
Mačva	2019–20	Serbian SuperLiga	7	1	0	0	–		–		7	1
Alashkert	2020–21	Armenian Premier League	12	1	2	0	0	0	–		14	1
Alashkert	2021–22	Armenian Premier League	5	0	0	0	7 (Note: Three appearances in UEFA Champions League qualifying phase, one appearance in UEFA Europa League qualifying phase, three appearances in UEFA Europa Conference League)	0	1 (Note: One appearance in Armenian Supercup)	0	13	1
Alashkert	Total		17	1	2	0	7	0	1	0	27	1
Zvijezda 09	2021–22	First League	3	1	0	0	–		–		3	1
Enosis Neon Paralimni	2022–23	Cypriot First Division	3	0	0	0	–		–		3	0
Hajduk Divoš	2022–23	Vojvodina League South	2	1	0	0	–		–		2	1
OFK Žarkovo	2023–24	Belgrade Zone League	0	0	0	0	–		–		0	0
Career total			291	71	10	1	7	0	1	0	309	72

== Honours ==
=== Club ===
Alashkert

- Armenian Premier League: 2020–21
- Armenian Supercup: 2021
