= István Fülöp =

Hungarian politician (born 1958)

Member of the National Assembly
- In office 15 May 2002 – 5 May 2014

Personal details
- Born: 4 May 1958 (age 67) Vásárosnamény, Hungary
- Party: Fidesz (since 2005)
- Other political affiliations: MDF (until 2004)
- Spouse: Judit Fülöpné Kecskés
- Children: Arnold; Ákos
- Profession: politician

István Fülöp (born 4 May 1958) is a Hungarian politician, member of the National Assembly (MP) for Mátészalka (Szabolcs-Szatmár-Bereg County Constituency IX) between 2002 and 2014.

He was a member of the Hungarian Democratic Forum (MDF) until 2004 when expelled from the party along with other members of the Lakitelek Group led by Sándor Lezsák. They founded the National Forum which alliance with the Fidesz in that year. Fülöp, later, joined Fidesz in 2005. He was the President of the Szabolcs-Szatmar-Bereg county government from 2006 to 2008.

== Personal life ==
He is married. His wife is Judit Fülöpné Kecskés. They have two sons, Arnold and Ákos.
