= Borisz Tóth =

Hungarian association football player

Personal information
- Full name: Borisz Alexander Tóth
- Date of birth: 7 July 2002 (age 24)
- Place of birth: Miskolc, Hungary
- Height: 1.77 m (5 ft 10 in)
- Position: Central midfielder

Team information
- Current team: Siófok
- Number: 20

Youth career
- 2010–2018: Diósgyőr

Senior career*
Years	Team	Apps	(Gls)
2018–	Diósgyőr	1	(0)
2020–2021	→ Kazincbarcika (loan)	19	(0)
2022–2023	→ Tiszaújváros (loan)	49	(12)
2024–	→ Siófok (loan)	1	(0)

International career^{‡}
2019	Hungary U-17	4	(0)
2021	Hungary U-19	1	(0)
- * Club domestic league appearances and goals as of 18 February 2024 ‡ National team caps and goals as of 2 February 2021

Borisz Alexander Tóth (born 7 July 2002) is a Hungarian professional footballer who plays for Siófok on loan from Diósgyőr.
