= José Cortés (footballer) =

Colombian footballer (born 1994)

Personal information
- Full name: José Ricardo Cortés
- Date of birth: 8 September 1994 (age 32)
- Place of birth: Cali, Colombia
- Height: 1.79 m (5 ft 10 in)
- Position: Right winger

Team information
- Current team: Maccabi Petah Tikva
- Number: 77

Senior career*
Years	Team	Apps	(Gls)
2015–2017	Real América	40	(30)
2017–2018	Atlético Bucaramanga	10	(0)
2018–2020	Club Destroyers	44	(12)
2020–2021	Diósgyőr	10	(0)
2021–2022	FC Košice	29	(16)
2022–2023	Al-Yarmouk SC		
2023	Borac Banja Luka	12	(2)
2024	Carlos A. Mannucci	31	(5)
2025	Hapoel Hadera	15	(4)
2025–	Maccabi Petah Tikva	33	(13)
- * Club domestic league appearances and goals as of 24 June 2026

José Ricardo Cortés (born 8 September 1994) is a Colombian football right winger who plays for Israeli club Maccabi Petah Tikva.

== Career statistics ==
As of 24 June 2026

Club	Division	League			Cup		Continental		Total	
Club	Division	Season	Apps	Goals	Apps	Goals	Apps	Goals	Apps	Goals
Real América	Liga Nacional B	2015-16	28	24	—		—		28	24
Real América	Liga Nacional B	2016-17	12	6	—		—		12	6
Real América	Total		40	30	0	0	0	0	40	30
Atlético Bucaramanga	Categoría Primera A	2017	10	0	—		—		10	0
Atlético Bucaramanga	Categoría Primera A	2018	0	0	—		—		0	0
Atlético Bucaramanga	Total		10	0	0	0	0	0	10	0
Club Destroyers	Bolivian Primera División	2019	44	12	—		—		44	12
Diósgyőr	Nemzeti Bajnokság I	2020-21	10	0	—		—		10	0
FC Košice	2. Liga (Slovakia)	2021-22	29	16	4	0	—		33	16
Borac Banja Luka	Premier League of Bosnia and Herzegovina	2022-23	12	2	—		2	1	14	3
Carlos A. Mannucci	Liga 1 (Peru)	2024	31	5	—		—		31	5
Hapoel Hadera	Israeli Premier League	2024–2025	15	4	—		—		15	4
Maccabi Petah Tikva	Liga Leumit	2025–2026	33	13	1	0	—		34	13
Career total			224	82	5	0	2	1	231	83
