= Yannick Ndzoumou =

Cameroonian footballer (born 1996)

Personal information
- Date of birth: 18 May 1996 (age 30)
- Place of birth: Yaoundé, Cameroon
- Height: 1.89 m (6 ft 2 in)
- Position: Centre-back

Team information
- Current team: Ouest Tourangeau

Youth career
- 2018–2019: Fortuna du Mfou

Senior career*
Years	Team	Apps	(Gls)
2019	Diósgyőr	3	(0)
2021–2022	Guipry-Messac	12	(1)
2022–2023	Sablé	6	(0)
2024–	Ouest Tourangeau	1	(0)
- * Club domestic league appearances and goals as of 7 September 2024

Yannick Ndzoumou (born 18 May 1996) is a Cameroonian professional footballer who plays as a centre-back for French Championnat National 3 club Ouest Tourangeau.

== Career statistics ==
As of matches played 25 August 2019

Club	Season	League		Cup		Europe		Total	
Club	Season	Apps	Goals	Apps	Goals	Apps	Goals	Apps	Goals
Diósgyőr	2018–19	2	0	0	0	–	–	2	0
Diósgyőr	2019–20	1	0	0	0	–	–	1	0
Diósgyőr	Total	3	0	0	0	0	0	3	0
Career total		3	0	0	0	0	0	3	0
