= Ismaila Ousman =

Cameroonian footballer (born 1997)

Personal information
- Full name: Ismaila Ousman
- Date of birth: 16 June 1997 (age 29)
- Place of birth: Yaoundé, Cameroon
- Height: 1.77 m (5 ft 10 in)
- Position: Left midfielder

Team information
- Current team: Diósgyőr
- Number: 5

Youth career
- 2018–2019: Fortuna du Mfou

Senior career*
Years	Team	Apps	(Gls)
2019–	Diósgyőr	1	(0)
- * Club domestic league appearances and goals as of 9 March 2019

Ismaila Ousman (born 16 June 1997) is a Cameroonian professional footballer who plays for Diósgyőri VTK.

== Club statistics ==
Club	Season	League		Cup		Europe		Total	
Club	Season	Apps	Goals	Apps	Goals	Apps	Goals	Apps	Goals
Diósgyőr
Diósgyőr	2018–19	1	0	0	0	–	–	1	0
Diósgyőr	Total	1	0	0	0	0	0	1	0
Career Total		1	0	0	0	0	0	1	0

Updated to games played as of 9 March 2019.
