= Diósgyőri Stadion =

Stadium in Miskolc-Diósgyőr, Hungary

DVTK Stadion
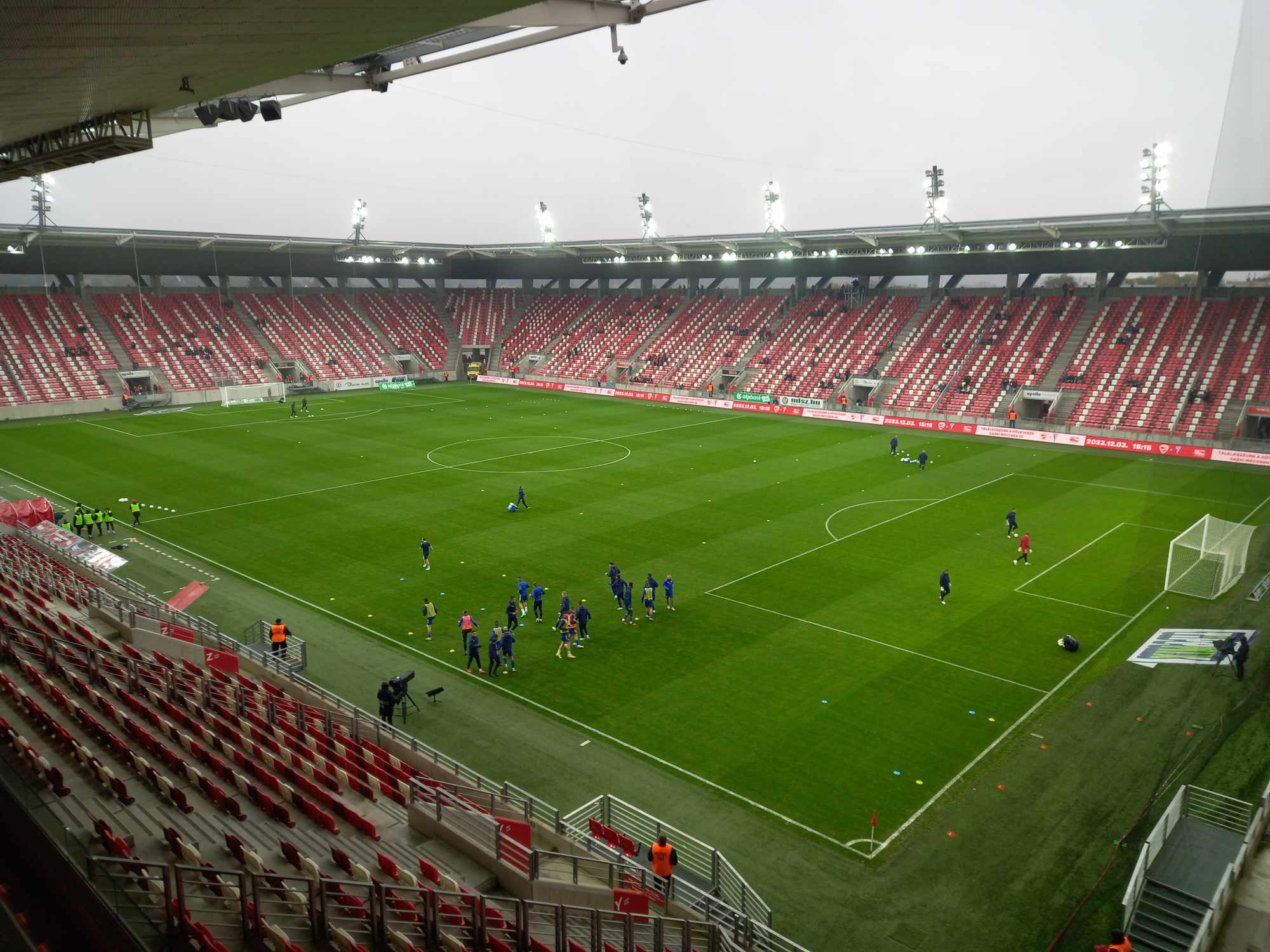
- UEFA
- Interactive map of DVTK Stadion
- Location: Miskolc, Hungary
- Coordinates: 48°5′58″N 20°43′2″E
- Owner: City of Miskolc
- Capacity: 15,325 (all seated)
- Surface: Grass
- Record attendance: 12,753 (Diósgyőr v Mezőkövesd; 5 May 2018)
- Field size: 105 x 68
- Public transit: DVTK Stadion (1, 1AV); Bulgárföld városrész (6, 53, 54)

Construction
- Groundbreaking: 2016
- Opened: 5 May 2018
- Cost: 10,9 billion HUF
- Architect: Péter Pottyondy
- Main contractor: Közti zrt.

Tenant
- Diósgyőri VTK (2018–present)

DVTK Stadion is a multi-purpose stadium in Miskolc, Hungary. It is the playing field of the local football association and it is the home of Diósgyőri VTK.

== History ==
=== Planning ===
On 7 October 2013, it was announced that a UEFA stadium category C stadium will be built in "British-style" in Miskolc. 4,5 billion HUF will be guaranteed for the construction by the Hungarian government. The new arena will be able to host about 15,000 spectators. The whole old stadium will be demolished except for the newly built stand. Behind the goals two new stands will be built which will be able to host 2,800 spectators each, while the new main stand will host 6,000 fans. The mayor of Miskolc, Ákos Kriza, pointed out that the infrastructure has to be fixed around the stadium.

On 28 November 2013, Ákos Kriza and László Sebestyén announced that the government approved the construction of a new stadium. The available budget for the reconstruction is 4,5 billion HUF.

On 25 February 2014, László Sebestyén, Hungarian Parliament MP, announced that the reconstruction will be started in the summer of 2014. The athletics track will be removed from the stadium. There will be 350 million HUF for a new track at the sports centre of the University of Miskolc. The new stadium will be built in British style i.e. the stands will be as close as possible to the pitch.

On 10 September 2014, the Diósgyőri Stadionrekonstrukciós Ltd. and Ministry of Human Resource (in Hungarian: Emberi Erőforrások Minisztériuma) signed the contract in connection with the reconstruction of the new stadium.

On 18 September 2014, it was announced that, during the reconstruction, Diósgyőr will play their home matches at the Miskolci VSC's stadium in Miskolc.

On 9 February 2015, the new 4 UEFA stadium category stadium became a highlighted project of the Nemzeti Stadionfejlesztési Program (National Stadium Development Program). From the 2015 budget the project will receive 2.75 billion HUF. In addition, the project will receive another 800 million HUF the same year. In 2016, 2.7 billion HUF will be available for the reconstruction.

The new stadium will be able to host 15,325 spectators. There will be 19 skyboxes, 13 buffets, .

=== Construction ===
On 1 December 2016 the construction of the stadium officially started. Ákos Kriza, mayor of Miskolc, said that there are historic constructions in the city of Miskolc including the athletic tracks in the stadium of Miskolci VSC. Ervin Pásztor, managing director of Diósgyőri Stadionrekonstrukciós Kft, and Tamás Szabó, managing director of Diósgyőri VTK were present.

On 19 October 2017, the pitch was covered with grass after the heating system was installed.

On 30 January 2018, it was announced that major delays are expected concerning the opening of the new stadium.

On 29 March 2018, the floodlights were switched on.

=== Opening ===
On 5 May 2018, the stadium was opened officially. The first official match was played between Diósgyőr and Mezkőkövesd in the 2017–18 Nemzeti Bajnokság I season. The match ended with a 1–0 win for the Borsod-rival Mezőkövesd in front of 12,753 spectators. The first goal was scored by Dražić in the 88th minute of the game.

On 19 May 2018, Diósgyőr celebrated their first victory in their new stadium when they beat Paksi FC in the 30th round of the 2017–18 Nemzeti Bajnokság I season. However, the only goal of the match was scored by a Paks-player as an own goal by Bartha in the 26th minute. Only 4036 spectators saw the second live match in their new stadium.

On 29 May 2018, it was announced that the price of the ticket against Videoton FC, already champions, on the 33 match day would be 150 HUF. The last match of the 2017–18 Nemzeti Bajnokság I season was decisive for the club since they were in relegation position. Diósgyőr beat Videoton 2-1 (and hence were not relegated) in front of 10,143 spectators on 2 June 2018.

=== Since 2018 ===
In 2023 Diósgyőr were promoted the Nemzeti Bajnokság I, after winning the 2022–23 Nemzeti Bajnokság II. Consequently, an increase in the number of attendance was projected.

On 22 October 2023, more than 12,000 spectators watched the match between Diósgyőr and Ferencvárosi TC in the 2023–24 Nemzeti Bajnokság I. In an interview with Nemzeti Sport, Dénes Dibusz, the goalkeeper of Ferencváros and the Hungarian national team, said that it is not surprising that there would be a lot of spectators because if Diósgyőr plays well, many supporters watch their matches live.

== Milestone matches ==
5 May 2018	Diósgyőr (Hungary)	0–1	(Hungary) Mezőkövesd	(First Nemzeti Bajnokság I match)
		Report	88' Dražić	Attendance: 12,753; Referee: (Hungary)

18 September 2021 2021-22 Magyar Kupa	Diósgyőr (Hungary)	2–1	(Hungary) TBD	(First Magyar Kupa match)
	Zsolnai 2' Makrai 41'	Report	Bányai 29'	Attendance: 1 Referee: (Hungary)

== Awards ==
The Diósgyőri Stadion was voted as the Stadium of the Year by the jury of the Polish StadiumDB.com. The stadium received a total of 9.17 points (architectural value: 4.00; functionality value: 3.33; innovation: 1.83). Diósgyőri Stadium preceded stadiums like Samara Arena, Mordovia Arena, MOL Aréna Sóstó, and Timsah Arena.

== Gallery ==
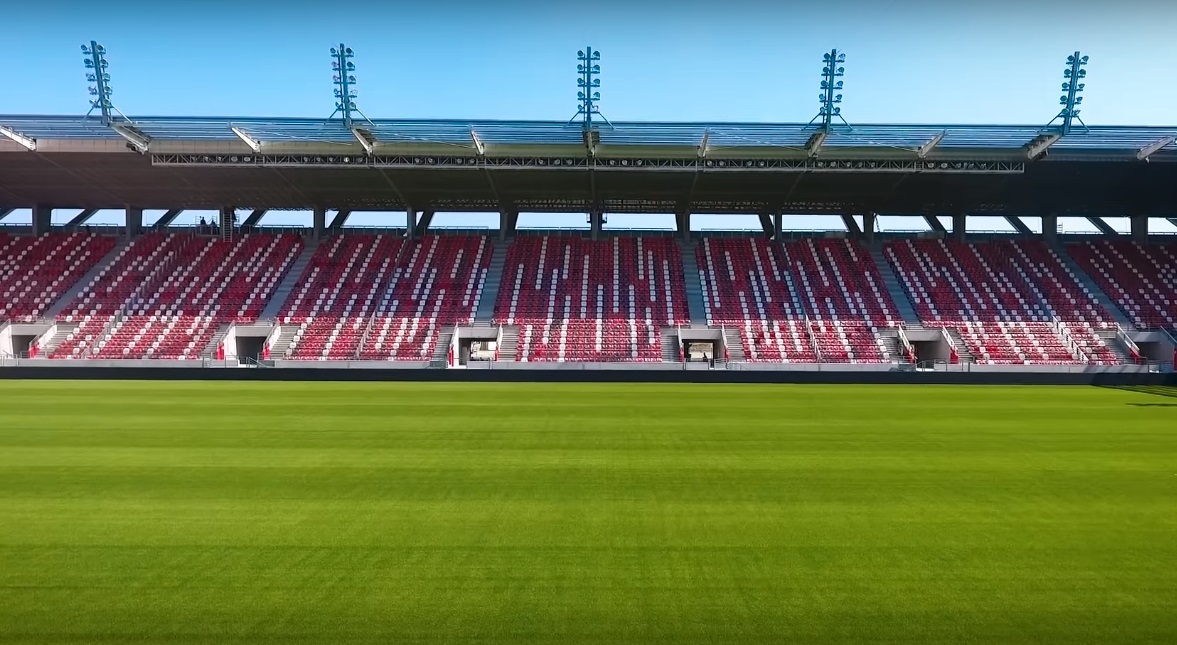
Opposite to the main stand

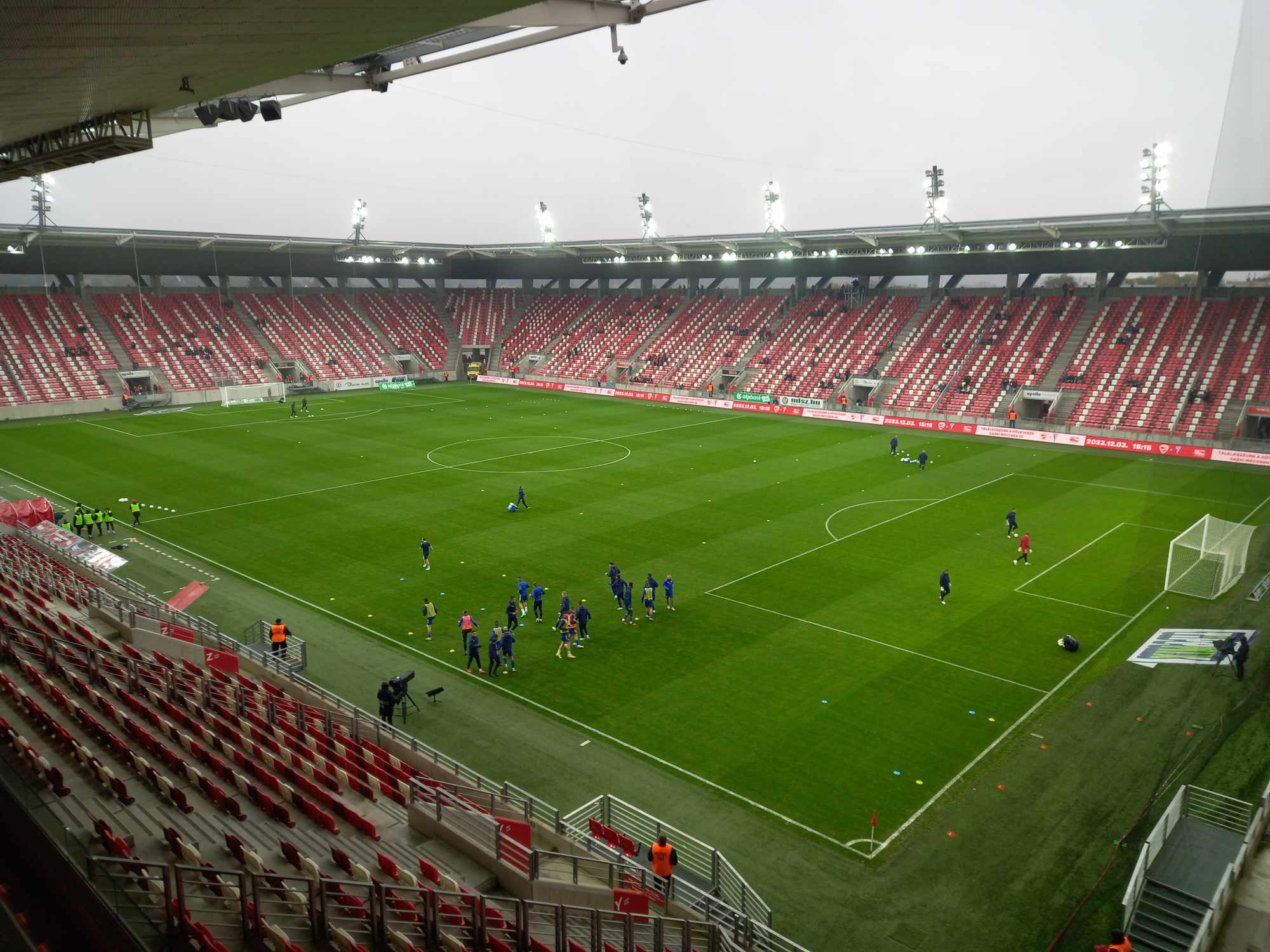
Diósgyőr are playing against Mezőkövesd

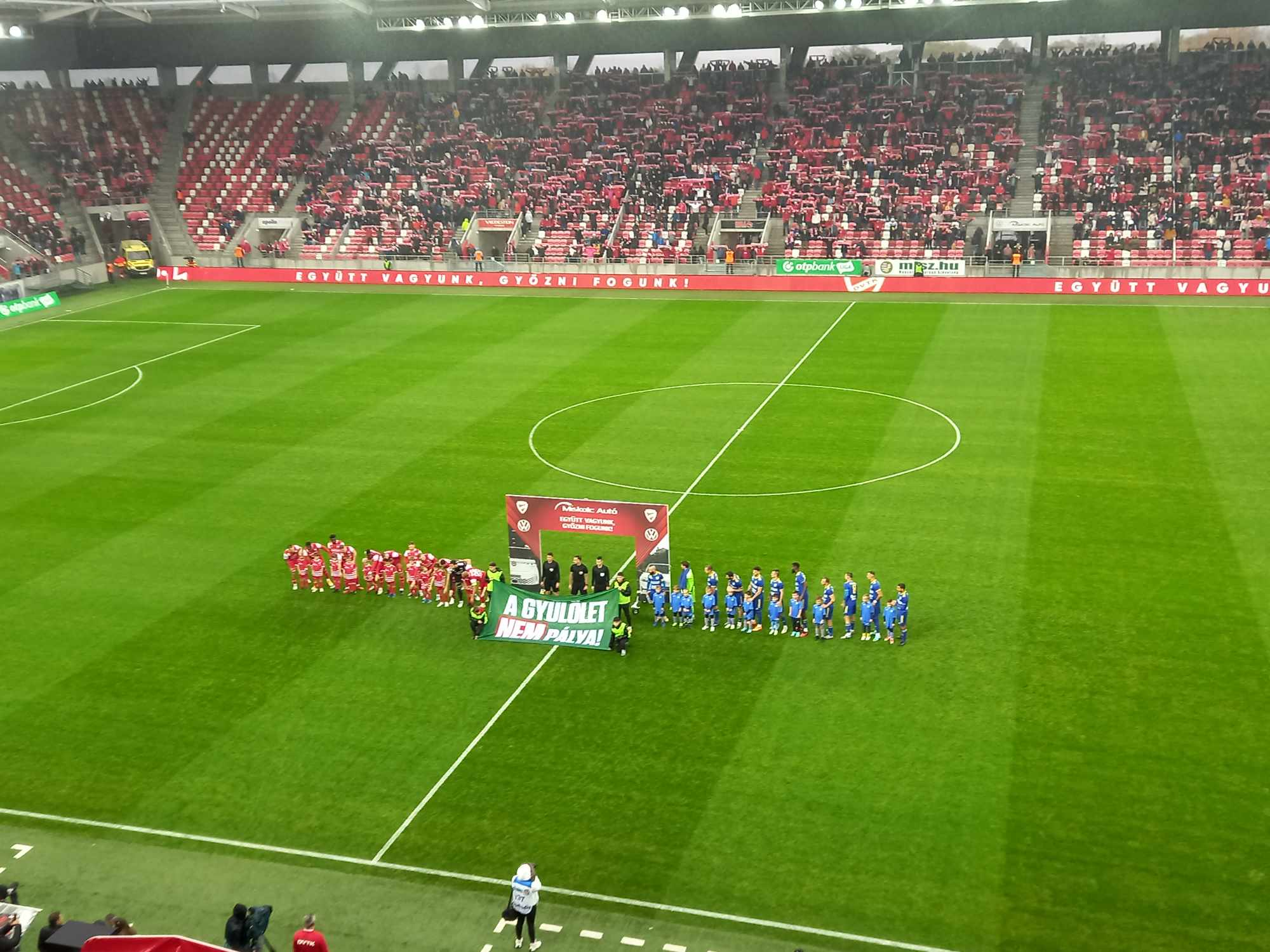
The Borsod derby

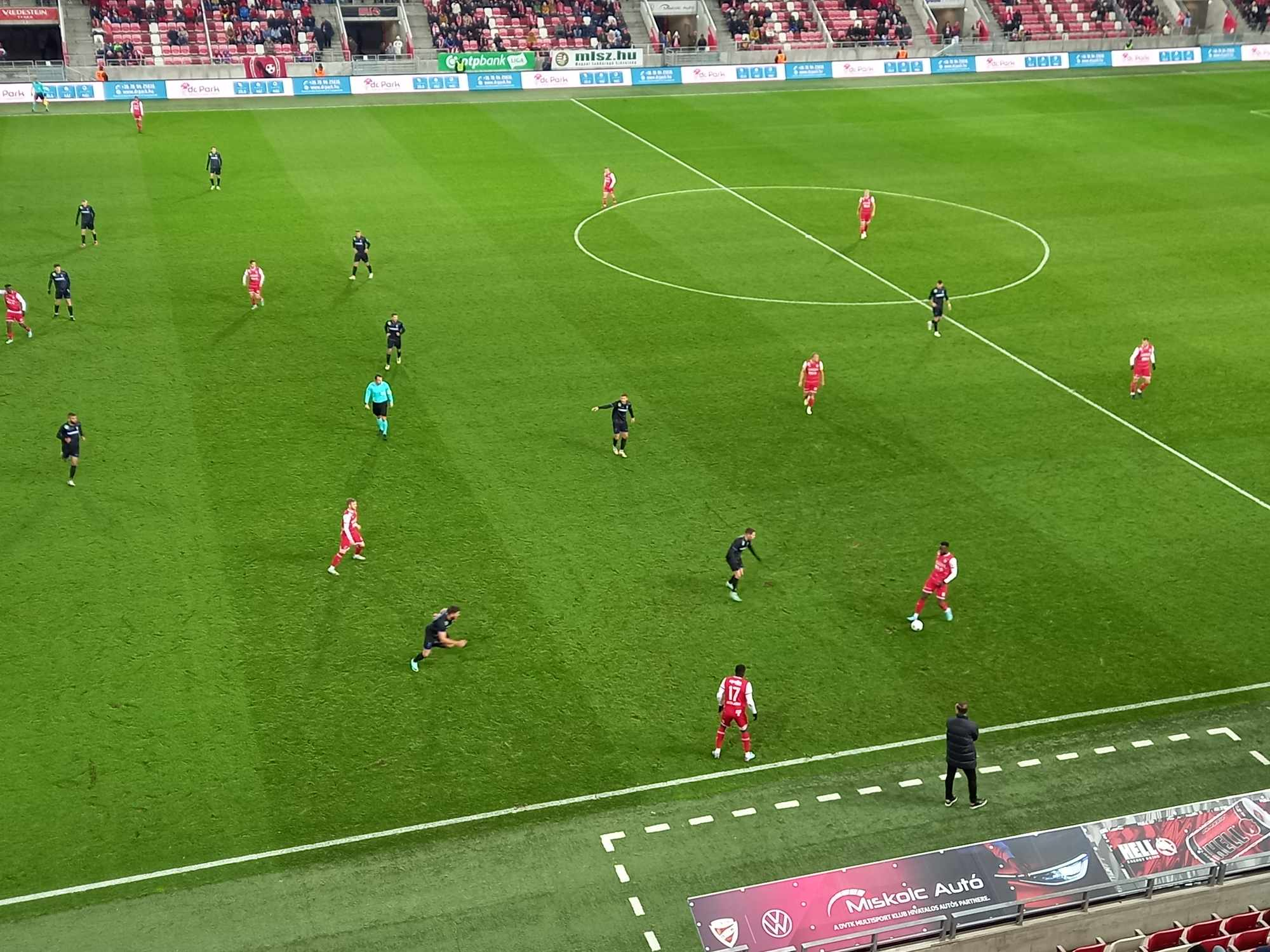
Diósgyőr against Zalaegerszeg on 3 December 2023
