= Tamás Géringer =

Hungarian footballer (born 1999)

- Géringer playing for Tiszakécske in 2026

Personal information
- Date of birth: 19 May 1999 (age 27)
- Place of birth: Budapest, Hungary
- Height: 1.84 m (6 ft 0 in)
- Position: Defensive midfielder

Team information
- Current team: Budafok
- Number: 30

Youth career
- 2014–2019: Diósgyőr

Senior career*
| Years | Team | Apps | (Gls) |
| 2019–2020 | Diósgyőr | 4 | (0) |
| 2019–2020 | → Kazincbarcika (loan) | 23 | (0) |
| 2020–2021 | Balatonfüred | 32 | (3) |
| 2021–2022 | BVSC | 33 | (1) |
| 2022 | Balassagyarmat | 6 | (0) |
| 2022–2023 | Balatonfüred | 28 | (0) |
| 2023–2024 | Egri | 23 | (0) |
| 2024–2026 | Tiszakécske | 34 | (3) |
| 2026– | Budafok | 7 | (1) |

International career
| 2016 | Hungary U-18 | 1 | (0) |
- * Club domestic league appearances and goals as of 19 September 2026

Tamás Géringer (born 19 May 1999) is a Hungarian professional footballer who plays as a defensive midfielder for Nemzeti Bajnokság III club Budafok. He has a twin brother who is also a footballer, László.

== Career statistics ==
As of match played 11 May 2019

Appearances and goals by club, season and competition
| Club | Season | League | | | Cup | | Europe | | Total | |
| Club | Season | Division | Apps | Goals | Apps | Goals | Apps | Goals | Apps | Goals |
|---|---|---|---|---|---|---|---|---|---|---|
| Diósgyőr | 2018–19 | Nemzeti Bajnokság I | 4 | 0 | 0 | 0 | — | | 4 | 0 |
| Career total | | | 4 | 0 | 0 | 0 | 0 | 0 | 4 | 0 |
