= Kristóf Polgár =

Hungarian footballer

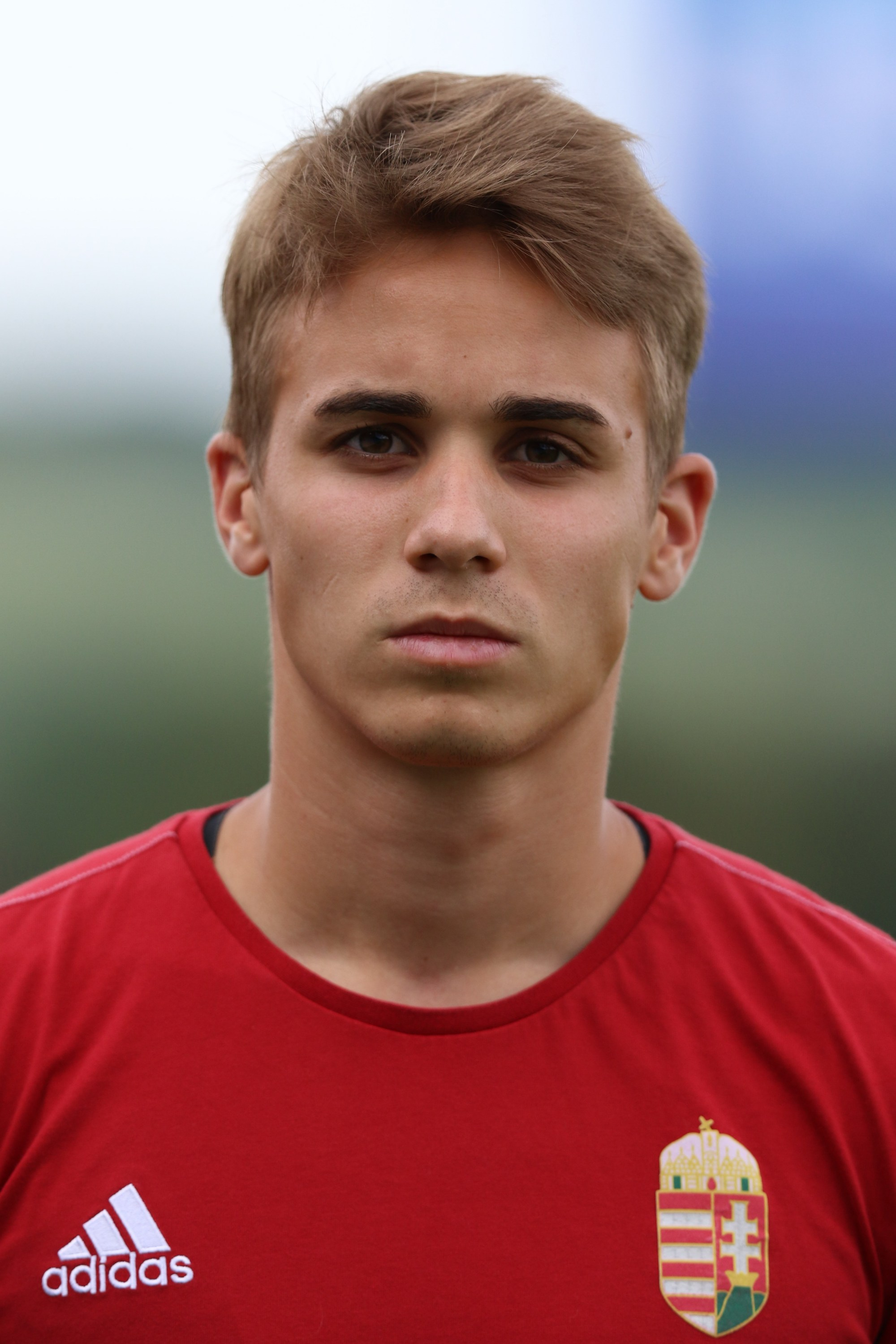

Personal information
- Date of birth: 28 November 1996 (age 29)
- Place of birth: Komárom, Hungary
- Height: 1.81 m (5 ft 11 1/2 in)
- Position: Defender

Team information
- Current team: Kazincbarcikai
- Number: 13

Youth career
- 2010–2012: MTK Budapest
- 2012–2016: Liverpool

Senior career*
Years	Team	Apps	(Gls)
2016–2018	Haladás	43	(1)
2018–2022	Diósgyőr	81	(3)
2022–2024	Gyirmót	54	(2)
2024–	Kazincbarcikai	40	(3)

International career^{‡}
2014	Hungary U-19	1	(0)
2015	Hungary U-20	1	(1)
2015–2017	Hungary U-21	4	(0)
- * Club domestic league appearances and goals as of 30 May 2026 ‡ National team caps and goals as of 12 June 2017

Kristóf Polgár (born 28 November 1996) is a Hungarian football player who plays for Kazincbarcikai.

== Club career ==
On 15 July 2022, Polgár signed a two-year contract, with an option for the third year, with Gyirmót.

== Career statistics ==
Appearances and goals by club, season and competition
Club	Season	League			Cup		Europe		Total	
Club	Season	Division	Apps	Goals	Apps	Goals	Apps	Goals	Apps	Goals
Haladás
Haladás	2016–17	Nemzeti Bajnokság I	28	0	1	0	—		29	0
Haladás	2017–18	Nemzeti Bajnokság I	15	1	0	0	—		15	1
Haladás	Total		43	1	1	0	0	0	44	1
Diósgyőr
Diósgyőr	2018–19	Nemzeti Bajnokság I	12	0	3	0	—		15	0
Diósgyőr	2019–20	Nemzeti Bajnokság I	32	1	3	0	—		35	1
Diósgyőr	2020–21	Nemzeti Bajnokság I	16	0	2	0	—		18	0
Diósgyőr	Total		60	1	8	0	0	0	68	1
Career total			103	2	9	0	0	0	112	2

Updated to games played as of 15 May 2021.
