= Gábor Molnár (footballer) =

Hungarian footballer (born 1994

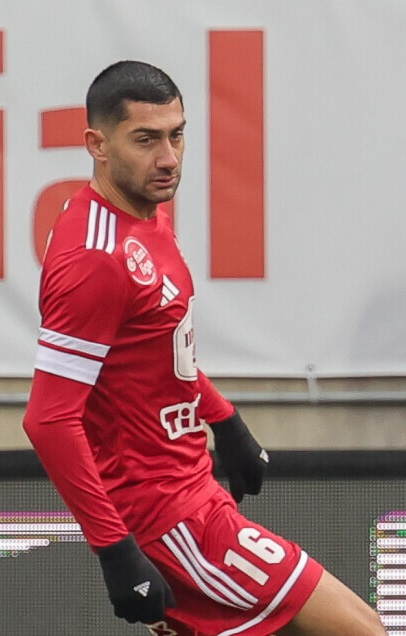
- Molnár playing for Kisvárda in 2025

Personal information
- Date of birth: 16 May 1994 (age 32)
- Place of birth: Miskolc, Hungary
- Height: 1.78 m (5 ft 10 in)
- Position: Forward

Team information
- Current team: Kisvárda
- Number: 16

Youth career
- 2003–2005: Edelényi VSE
- 2005–2009: Kazincbarcika
- 2009: Borsodszirák
- 2009–2010: Bóda-Völgyi TSE

Senior career*
Years	Team	Apps	(Gls)
2010–2011	BTE Edelény	36	(15)
2011–2014	Kazincbarcika	35	(13)
2012–2013	→ Tiszaújváros (loan)	28	(14)
2014–2017	Mezőkövesd	85	(20)
2017–2019	Puskás Akadémia	30	(3)
2018–2019	→ Mezőkövesd (loan)	21	(8)
2019–2020	Mezőkövesd	7	(0)
2020–2022	Diósgyőr	60	(18)
2022–2024	Mezőkövesd	58	(6)
2024–	Kisvárda	54	(9)

International career
2015	Hungary U-21	1	(0)
- * Club domestic league appearances and goals as of 30 May 2026

Gábor Molnár (born 16 May 1994) is a Hungarian professional footballer who plays as a forward for Kisvárda. He is of Roma descent.

== Club statistics ==
As of match played 15 May 2021.

Appearances and goals by club, season and competition
Club	Season	League			Cup		League Cup		Europe		Total	
Club	Season	Division	Apps	Goals	Apps	Goals	Apps	Goals	Apps	Goals	Apps	Goals
Edelény	2010–11	Hungarian County League	20	10	1	1	–	–	–	–	21	11
Edelény	2011–12	Hungarian County League	16	5	0	0	–	–	–	–	16	5
Edelény	Total		36	15	1	1	0	0	0	0	37	16
Kazincbarcika	2011–12	Nemzeti Bajnokság II	9	0	0	0	–	–	–	–	9	0
Kazincbarcika	2013–14	Nemzeti Bajnokság III	26	13	1	1	–	–	–	–	27	14
Kazincbarcika	Total		35	13	1	1	0	0	0	0	36	14
Tiszaújváros	2012–13	Nemzeti Bajnokság III	28	14	8	2	0	0	–	–	36	16
Mezőkövesd	2014–15	Nemzeti Bajnokság II	29	6	3	0	4	0	–	–	36	6
Mezőkövesd	2015–16	Nemzeti Bajnokság II	29	6	2	0	–	–	–	–	31	6
Mezőkövesd	2016–17	Nemzeti Bajnokság I	27	8	9	3	–	–	–	–	36	11
Mezőkövesd	2018–19	Nemzeti Bajnokság I	21	8	7	1	–	–	–	–	28	9
Mezőkövesd	2019–20	Nemzeti Bajnokság I	7	0	2	1	–	–	–	–	9	1
Mezőkövesd	Total		113	28	23	5	4	0	0	0	140	33
Puskás Akadémia	2017–18	Nemzeti Bajnokság I	26	2	8	0	–	–	–	–	34	2
Puskás Akadémia	2018–19	Nemzeti Bajnokság I	4	1	0	0	–	–	–	–	4	1
Puskás Akadémia	Total		30	3	8	0	0	0	0	0	38	3
Diósgyőr	2019–20	Nemzeti Bajnokság I	15	4	0	0	–	–	–	–	15	4
Diósgyőr	2020–21	Nemzeti Bajnokság I	13	5	2	0	–	–	–	–	15	5
Diósgyőr	Total		28	9	2	0	0	0	0	0	30	9
Career total			270	82	43	9	0	4	0	0	317	91
