= Rui Pedro (footballer, born 1988) =

Portuguese footballer

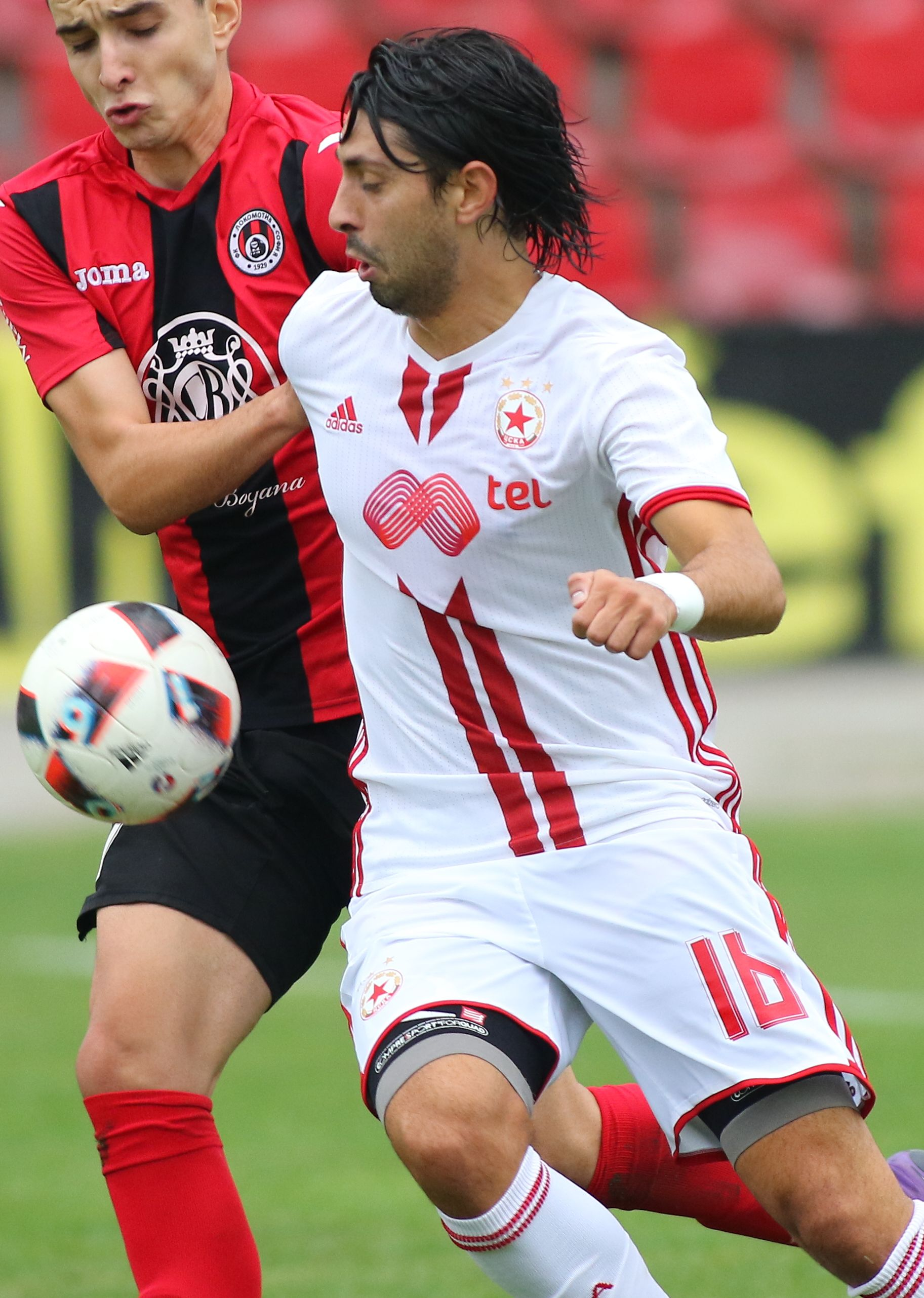
- Rui Pedro playing with CSKA Sofia in 2016

Personal information
- Full name: Rui Pedro Couto Ramalho
- Date of birth: 2 July 1988 (age 38)
- Place of birth: Vila Nova de Gaia, Portugal
- Height: 1.80 m (5 ft 11 in)
- Position: Forward

Youth career
- 1996–1998: Leverense
- 1998–2007: Porto
- 2003–2004: → Padroense (loan)

Senior career*
Years	Team	Apps	(Gls)
2007–2011	Porto	0	(0)
2008	→ Estrela Amadora (loan)	4	(0)
2008–2009	→ Portimonense (loan)	22	(0)
2009–2010	→ Gil Vicente (loan)	29	(8)
2010–2011	→ Leixões (loan)	27	(8)
2011–2014	CFR Cluj	62	(10)
2014–2016	Académica	50	(8)
2016–2017	CSKA Sofia	25	(4)
2017–2019	Ferencváros	9	(0)
2019	Haladás	15	(5)
2019–2021	Diósgyőr	41	(4)
2021	Mezőkövesdi	10	(0)
2021–2023	Sanjoanense	33	(13)
Total		327	(60)

International career
2004	Portugal U16	3	(2)
2004–2005	Portugal U17	14	(3)
2005–2006	Portugal U18	7	(2)
2006–2007	Portugal U19	14	(5)
2008	Portugal U20	9	(3)
2008–2010	Portugal U21	19	(5)
- * Club domestic league appearances and goals

Rui Pedro Couto Ramalho (born 2 July 1988), known as Rui Pedro, is a Portuguese former professional footballer who played as a forward.

== Club career ==
Born in Vila Nova de Gaia, Porto District, Rui Pedro joined FC Porto's youth system in 1998, at the age of 10. He was promoted to the main squad for 2007–08, but his input consisted of 45 minutes in a 0–0 away draw against C.D. Fátima in the Taça da Liga. He finished the season on loan, appearing rarely for fellow Primeira Liga side C.F. Estrela da Amadora.

Rui Pedro spent the following three years out on loan, appearing for three Segunda Liga clubs and playing and scoring regularly for the last two, Gil Vicente F.C. and Leixões SC. In summer 2011, he left Porto by mutual agreement and signed for three years with CFR Cluj in Romania, joining a host of compatriots at the Liga I team, including manager Jorge Costa. On 20 November 2012, he achieved the only hat-trick of his professional career, scoring all three goals in a 3–1 home win over S.C. Braga in the group stage of the UEFA Champions League.

Rui Pedro returned to Portugal on 8 July 2014, joining Académica de Coimbra on a two-year deal. He netted six times in his first year to help his team narrowly avoid relegation, but they did go down the following campaign.

On 26 June 2017, Rui Pedro was signed by Nemzeti Bajnokság I club Ferencvárosi TC for three years, from Bulgaria's PFC CSKA Sofia.

== International career ==
Rui Pedro earned 66 caps for Portugal across all youth levels, scoring 20 goals. On 25 March 2009 he, alongside teammate Bruno Pereirinha, was suspended by under-21 coach Carlos Queiroz after both attempted an unsuccessful backpass penalty during a match against Cape Verde in the Madeira International Tournament (the score was then at 2–0 for the hosts).

== Career statistics ==
As of 10 May 2021

Club	Season	League		Cup		Europe		Total	
Club	Season	Apps	Goals	Apps	Goals	Apps	Goals	Apps	Goals
Estrela Amadora
Estrela Amadora	2007–08	4	0	0	0	0	0	4	0
Portimonense
Portimonense	2008–09	22	0	3	0	0	0	25	0
Gil Vicente
Gil Vicente	2009–10	29	8	5	3	0	0	34	11
Leixões
Leixões	2010–11	27	8	7	0	0	0	34	8
Total		82	16	15	3	0	0	97	19
CFR Cluj
CFR Cluj	2011–12	13	0	1	0	0	0	14	0
CFR Cluj	2012–13	24	7	5	0	7	3	36	10
CFR Cluj	2013–14	25	3	0	0	0	0	25	3
Total		62	10	6	0	7	3	75	13
Académica
Académica	2014–15	29	6	3	0	0	0	32	3
Académica	2015–16	21	2	2	0	0	0	23	2
Total		50	8	5	0	0	0	55	5
CSKA Sofia
CSKA Sofia	2016–17	25	4	1	1	0	0	26	5
Total		25	4	1	1	0	0	26	5
Ferencváros
Ferencváros	2017–18	8	0	0	0	3	1	11	1
Ferencváros	2018–19	1	0	1	0	0	0	2	0
Total		9	0	1	0	3	1	13	1
Haladás
Haladás	2018–19	15	5	2	0	–	–	17	5
Total		15	5	2	0	0	0	17	5
Diósgyőr
Diósgyőr	2019–20	26	3	1	0	–	–	27	3
Diósgyőr	2020–21	13	1	1	2	–	–	14	3
Total		39	4	2	2	0	0	41	6
Mezőkövesdi
Mezőkövesdi	2020–21	10	0	2	1	–	–	12	1
Total		10	0	2	1	0	0	12	1
Career total		292	47	34	7	10	4	336	58

== Honours ==
CFR Cluj

- Liga I: 2011–12
