= Serhiy Shestakov =

Ukrainian footballer

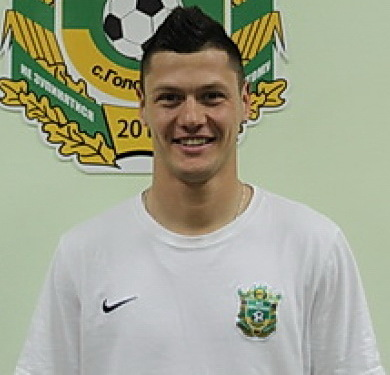

Personal information
- Full name: Serhiy Serhiyovych Shestakov
- Date of birth: 12 April 1990 (age 36)
- Place of birth: Ladyzhyn, Ukrainian SSR
- Height: 1.72 m (5 ft 7 1/2 in)
- Position: Midfielder

Team information
- Current team: Avanhard Lozova
- Number: 17

Youth career
- Youth Sportive School Ladyzhyn

Senior career*
Years	Team	Apps	(Gls)
2010–2011	Avanhard-Enerhiya Ladyzhyn (amateurs)	17	(4)
2011	→ SKAD-Yalpuh Bolhrad (amateurs) (loan)	1	(0)
2011	Sovinyon Tayirove (amateurs)	2	(0)
2012–2013	Odesa	43	(1)
2013	Nyva Ternopil	16	(2)
2014	UkrAhroKom Holovkivka	8	(1)
2014–2015	Naftovyk-Ukrnafta Okhtyrka	25	(3)
2015–2017	Olimpik Donetsk	56	(2)
2018–2021	Diósgyőr	84	(3)
2021–2022	Veres Rivne	9	(0)
2023–2024	LNZ Cherkasy	36	(3)
2024–2025	Lisne	20	(2)
2026	Kolos-2 Kovalivka	4	(0)
2026–	Avanhard Lozova	8	(1)
- * Club domestic league appearances and goals as of 6 May 2026

Serhiy Shestakov (Ukrainian: Сергій Сергійович Шестаков; born 12 April 1990) is a Ukrainian professional footballer who plays as a midfielder for Avanhard Lozova .

== Career ==
He played for the Ukrainian amateur football clubs, and then Shestakov spent time with some Ukrainian teams that played in the Ukrainian First League. But in July 2015 he signed a contract with the Ukrainian Premier League club FC Olimpik Donetsk. He made his debut for FC Olimpik as a substituted player in the game against FC Chornomorets Odesa on 18 July 2015 in the Ukrainian Premier League.

== Personal life ==
He is a twin brother of another Ukrainian football player, Mykhaylo Shestakov.
