= Barnabás Tóth =

Hungarian footballer (born 1994)

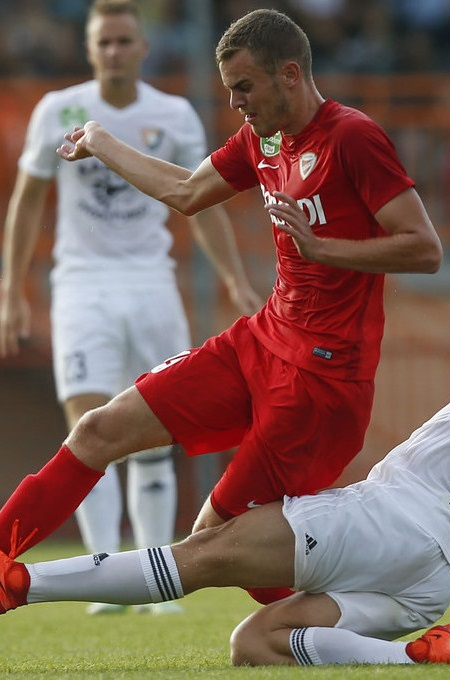
- Tóth playing for Diósgyőr in 2017

Personal information
- Date of birth: 28 July 1994 (age 32)
- Place of birth: Budapest, Hungary
- Height: 1.89 m (6 ft 2 in)
- Position: Midfielder

Team information
- Current team: Tiszakécske
- Number: 28

Youth career
- 2006–2013: Vác
- 2013–2014: Puskás Akadémia

Senior career*
Years	Team	Apps	(Gls)
2013–2015	Puskás Akadémia	0	(0)
2013–2015	Puskás Akadémia II	4	(0)
2015–2017	Vác	63	(6)
2017–2020	Diósgyőr	25	(1)
2017–2020	Diósgyőr II	11	(3)
2020	→ Tiszakécske (loan)	5	(0)
2020	→ Tiszakécske II (loan)	1	(0)
2020–2024	Dorog	66	(3)
2024	Rákospalota	9	(1)
2024–2025	Tiszakécske	24	(0)
2024	Tiszakécske II	3	(1)
2025–2026	Odi Sports	21	(1)
- * Club domestic league appearances and goals as of 8 June 2025

Barnabás Tóth (born 28 July 1994) is a Hungarian professional footballer who plays as a midfielder for Dhivehi Premier League club Odi Sports.

== Club career ==
On 1 July 2017, Tóth joined Nemzeti Bajnokság I club Diósgyőr, while taking his final exams in sports management at the Hungarian University of Sports Science. On 23 January 2020, he was loaned out to Nemzeti Bajnokság II club Tiszakécske for the second half of the season.

On 14 July 2020, Tóth signed a two-year contract with Nemzeti Bajnokság II side Dorog. On 15 July 2022, he signed a new 1-year contract with the club.

Tóth returned to Nemzeti Bajnokság II side Tiszakécske on 2 August 2024, after 3 season at Dorog and a short spell at Rákospalota in the third tier. He reunited with manager Pál Balogh, who worked with him in Dorog.

== Club statistics ==
As of match played 8 June 2025
