= Donát Orosz =

Hungarian association football player

Personal information
- Full name: Donát Benedek Orosz
- Date of birth: 28 July 2002 (age 24)
- Place of birth: Kazincbarcika, Hungary
- Height: 1.81 m (5 ft 11 in)
- Position: Defender

Youth career
- 2011–2014: Kazincbarcika
- 2014–2019: Diósgyőr

Senior career*
Years	Team	Apps	(Gls)
2019–2023	Diósgyőr	7	(0)
2018–2021	→ Diósgyőr II	28	(0)
2020–2021	→ Kazincbarcika (loan)	8	(0)
2022	→ Eger (loan)	8	(0)

International career
2018–2019	Hungary U-17	10	(0)
- * Club domestic league appearances and goals

Donát Benedek Orosz (born 28 July 2002) is a Hungarian former professional footballer.

== Career ==
Orosz represented Hungary at the 2019 UEFA European Under-17 Championship, where they reached quarterfinals. He also made one appearance at the 2019 FIFA U-17 World Cup.

Orosz retired from playing in January 2023.

== Club statistics ==
Updated to games played as of 20 May 2021.

Appearances and goals by club, season and competition
Club	Season	League			Cup		Europe		Total	
Club	Season	Division	Apps	Goals	Apps	Goals	Apps	Goals	Apps	Goals
Diósgyőr II
Diósgyőr II	2018–19	Nemzeti Bajnokság III	10	0	0	0	—		10	0
Diósgyőr II	2019–20	Nemzeti Bajnokság III	10	0	0	0	—		10	0
Diósgyőr II	2020–21	Nemzeti Bajnokság III	8	0	0	0	—		8	0
Diósgyőr II	Total		28	0	0	0	0	0	28	0
Kazincbarcika
Kazincbarcika	2019–20	Nemzeti Bajnokság II	1	0	0	0	—		1	0
Kazincbarcika	2020–21	Nemzeti Bajnokság II	7	0	0	0	—		7	0
Kazincbarcika	Total		8	0	0	0	0	0	8	0
Diósgyőr
Diósgyőr	2018–19	Nemzeti Bajnokság I	1	0	1	0	—		2	0
Diósgyőr	2019–20	Nemzeti Bajnokság I	5	0	1	0	—		6	0
Diósgyőr	2020–21	Nemzeti Bajnokság I	1	0	0	0	—		1	0
Diósgyőr	Total		7	0	2	0	0	0	9	0
Career total			43	0	2	0	0	0	45	0
