= Richárd Zsolnai =

Hungarian footballer (born 1995)

- Zsolnai playing for Békéscsaba in 2026

Personal information
- Full name: Richárd Tibor Zsolnai
- Date of birth: 28 March 1995 (age 31)
- Place of birth: Budapest, Hungary
- Height: 1.85 m (6 ft 1 in)
- Position: Forward

Team information
- Current team: Békéscsaba
- Number: 9

Youth career
- 2005–2008: Érd
- 2008–2009: Tárnok Bolha
- 2009–2013: Dunakanyar-Vác

Senior career*
Years	Team	Apps	(Gls)
2013–2019	Vác	173	(62)
2019–2022	Diósgyőr	27	(0)
2020	→ Budafok (loan)	7	(0)
2020–2021	→ Ajka (loan)	25	(8)
2022–2025	Ajka	81	(10)
2025–	Békéscsaba	28	(2)
- * Club domestic league appearances and goals as of 31 May 2026

Richárd Tibor Zsolnai (born 28 March 1995) is a Hungarian professional footballer who plays for Békéscsaba.

== Career ==
On 23 June 2022, Zsolnai returned to Ajka on a three-year contract.

== Career statistics ==
Appearances and goals by club, season and competition
Club	Season	League			Cup		Europe		Total	
Club	Season	Division	Apps	Goals	Apps	Goals	Apps	Goals	Apps	Goals
Vác
Vác	2012–13	Nemzeti Bajnokság II	0	0	4	1	—		4	1
Vác	2013–14	Megyei Bajnokság I	26	19	6	3	—		32	22
Vác	2014–15	Nemzeti Bajnokság III	27	17	3	3	—		30	20
Vác	2015–16	Nemzeti Bajnokság II	28	5	0	0	—		28	5
Vác	2016–17	Nemzeti Bajnokság II	22	4	0	0	—		22	4
Vác	2017–18	Nemzeti Bajnokság II	35	6	5	1	—		40	7
Vác	2018–19	Nemzeti Bajnokság II	35	11	2	2	—		37	13
Vác	Total		173	62	20	10	0	0	193	82
Diósgyőr	2019–20	Nemzeti Bajnokság I	1	0	2	0	—		3	0
Budafok	2019–20	Nemzeti Bajnokság II	7	0	0	0	—		7	0
Ajka	2020–21	Nemzeti Bajnokság II	2	1	0	0	—		2	1
Career total			183	63	22	10	0	0	205	83

Updated to games played as of 5 August 2020.
