= Kristóf Korbély =

Hungarian footballer

Personal information
- Date of birth: 26 May 2000 (age 26)
- Place of birth: Kazincbarcika, Hungary
- Height: 1.81 m (5 ft 11 in)
- Position: Forward

Team information
- Current team: Mosonmagyaróvár
- Number: 72

Youth career
- 2008–2012: Kazincbarcika
- 2012–2019: Diósgyőr

Senior career*
| Years | Team | Apps | (Gls) |
| 2019–2023 | Diósgyőr | 26 | (1) |
| 2020 | → Kazincbarcika (loan) | 4 | (0) |
| 2021 | → Kazincbarcika (loan) | 24 | (1) |
| 2023– | Mosonmagyaróvár | 29 | (0) |

International career^{‡}
| 2019 | Hungary U-21 | 2 | (0) |
- * Club domestic league appearances and goals as of 21 December 2023 ‡ National team caps and goals as of 15 October 2019

Kristóf Korbély (born 26 May 2000) is a Hungarian football player who plays for Mosonmagyaróvár.

== Career ==
=== Diósgyőr ===
On 20 April 2019, Korbély played his first match for Diósgyőr in a 1–0 win against Paks in the Hungarian League.

== Career statistics ==
Appearances and goals by club, season and competition
| Club | Season | League | | Cup | | Europe | | Total | |
| Club | Season | Apps | Goals | Apps | Goals | Apps | Goals | Apps | Goals |
|---|---|---|---|---|---|---|---|---|---|
Diósgyőr
| Diósgyőr | 2018–19 | 3 | 1 | 0 | 0 | – | – | 3 | 1 |
| Diósgyőr | 2019–20 | 18 | 0 | 1 | 0 | – | – | 19 | 0 |
| Diósgyőr | 2020–21 | 5 | 0 | 1 | 0 | – | – | 6 | 0 |
| Diósgyőr | Total | 26 | 1 | 2 | 0 | – | – | 28 | 1 |
| Career total | | 26 | 1 | 2 | 0 | 0 | 0 | 28 | 1 |

Updated to games played as of 16 December 2020.
