= Erik Bukrán =

Hungarian association football player

Personal information
- Date of birth: 6 December 1996 (age 29)
- Place of birth: Eger, Hungary
- Height: 1.95 m (6 ft 5 in)
- Position: Goalkeeper

Team information
- Current team: Békéscsaba
- Number: 33

Youth career
- 2003–2009: Pétervására
- 2009–2011: Eger
- 2011–2015: Budapest Honvéd
- 2015–2016: Hull City

Senior career*
Years	Team	Apps	(Gls)
2016–2021	Diósgyőr	13	(0)
2021–2022	Pécs	7	(0)
2022–	Békéscsaba	15	(0)

International career^{‡}
2015–2016	Hungary U-20	2	(0)
2017–2018	Hungary U-21	2	(0)
- * Club domestic league appearances and goals as of 30 May 2023 ‡ National team caps and goals as of 8 June 2018

Erik Bukrán (born 6 December 1996) is a Hungarian professional football player who plays for Békéscsaba.

== Club career ==
On 6 July 2021 Bukrán moved to Pécs.

== Career statistics ==
Appearances and goals by club, season and competition
Club	Season	League			Cup		Europe		Total	
Club	Season	Division	Apps	Goals	Apps	Goals	Apps	Goals	Apps	Goals
Diósgyőr
Diósgyőr	2016–17	Nemzeti Bajnokság I	1	0	1	0	—		2	0
Diósgyőr	2018–19	Nemzeti Bajnokság I	10	0	0	0	—		10	0
Diósgyőr	2019–20	Nemzeti Bajnokság I	2	0	0	0	—		2	0
Diósgyőr	2020–21	Nemzeti Bajnokság I	0	0	0	0	—		0	0
Diósgyőr	Total		13	0	1	0	0	0	14	0
Career total			13	0	1	0	0	0	14	0

Updated to games played as of 20 May 2021.
