= 2012–13 Paksi FC season =

Paks
2012–13 season
- Chairman: Zsolt Haraszti; Judit Balog
- Manager: Károly Kis (until 1 August); Tomislav Sivić
- Nemzeti Bajnokság I: 13th
- Hungarian Cup: Round of 16
- Hungarian League Cup: Group stage
- Top goalscorer: League: János Lázok (9); All: Attila Simon (12)
- Highest home attendance: 5,000 v Ferencváros (5 May 2013)
- Lowest home attendance: 100 v Vasas (13 November 2012)
Home colours	Away colours

The 2012–13 season was Paksi Football Club's 7th competitive season, 7th consecutive season in the Nemzeti Bajnokság I and 60th year in existence as a football club. In addition to the domestic league, Paks participated in this season's editions of the Hungarian Cup and Hungarian League Cup

== First team squad ==
Note: Flags indicate national team as defined under FIFA eligibility rules; some limited exceptions apply. Players may hold more than one non-FIFA nationality.

No.	Pos.	Nation	Player
1	GK	HUN	Gábor Németh
6	DF	HUN	Tamás Sifter
7	MF	HUN	Tamás Báló
8	DF	HUN	Gábor Kovács
10	MF	HUN	Tamás Kiss
11	MF	HUN	Gábor Vayer
16	MF	HUN	Tibor Heffler
17	DF	HUN	Dániel Juhász
18	DF	HUN	Attila Fiola
19	DF	HUN	István Mészáros
20	FW	HUN	János Lázok
21	MF	HUN	Gábor Bori

No.	Pos.	Nation	Player
24	FW	HUN	Norbert Csernyánszki
25	DF	HUN	Márton Eppel
27	MF	HUN	Norbert Heffler
30	DF	HUN	János Szabó
33	DF	HUN	József Zsók
39	FW	HUN	László Bartha
42	FW	SRB	Norbert Könyves
55	FW	HUN	Attila Tököli
63	DF	HUN	László Éger
77	MF	HUN	Dávid Kulcsár
89	FW	HUN	Roland Pap
95	FW	HUN	János Hahn

== Transfers ==
=== Summer ===
In: Note: Flags indicate national team as defined under FIFA eligibility rules; some limited exceptions apply. Players may hold more than one non-FIFA nationality.

No.	Pos.	Nation	Player
2	MF	HUN	István Nagy (loan return from Siófok)
20	FW	HUN	János Lázok (from MTK Budapest)
21	MF	HUN	Gábor Bori (from Kecskemét)
27	MF	HUN	Norbert Heffler (loan return from Siófok)
33	DF	HUN	József Zsók (from Kaposvár)
55	FW	HUN	Attila Tököli (from Kecskemét)
77	MF	HUN	Dávid Kulcsár (from Ferencváros)
87	FW	HUN	Barnabás Vári (loan return from Szolnok)
91	FW	HUN	Zsolt Haraszti (loan return from Siófok)
99	FW	HUN	Attila Simon (from Siófok)

Out: Note: Flags indicate national team as defined under FIFA eligibility rules; some limited exceptions apply. Players may hold more than one non-FIFA nationality.

No.	Pos.	Nation	Player
2	MF	HUN	István Nagy (loan to Szolnok)
5	DF	HUN	Zsolt Gévay (to Gyirmót)
13	MF	HUN	Dániel Böde (to Ferencváros)
13	GK	HUN	Máté Kiss (loan to Veszprém)
17	FW	HUN	József Magasföldi (to Gyirmót)
20	FW	HUN	Ádám Hrepka (loan return to MTK Budapest)
29	MF	HUN	Gábor Tamási (loan to Szolnok)
32	MF	HUN	Lóránd Szatmári (loan return to (Italy) Reggina)
53	FW	HUN	Tibor Montvai (to Nyíregyháza)
87	FW	HUN	Barnabás Vári (loan to Szolnok)
91	FW	HUN	Zsolt Haraszti (to Videoton)

=== Winter ===
In: Note: Flags indicate national team as defined under FIFA eligibility rules; some limited exceptions apply. Players may hold more than one non-FIFA nationality.

No.	Pos.	Nation	Player
1	GK	HUN	Gábor Németh (free agent)
8	DF	HUN	Gábor Kovács (from Eger)
17	DF	HUN	Dániel Juhász (from Zalaegerszeg)
23	GK	HUN	Máté Kiss (loan return from Veszprém)
26	FW	HUN	Attila Czinger (from Paks II)
42	FW	SRB	Norbert Könyves (from MTK Budapest)
92	MF	HUN	Norbert Pintér (from Paks II)
95	FW	HUN	János Hahn (from Paks U-19)

Out: Note: Flags indicate national team as defined under FIFA eligibility rules; some limited exceptions apply. Players may hold more than one non-FIFA nationality.

No.	Pos.	Nation	Player
1	GK	HUN	Attila Kovács (to Veszprém)
9	DF	HUN	Tamás Csehi (to Pálhalma)
22	MF	HUN	István Sipeki (to Szolnok)
28	GK	HUN	Péter Pokorni (to Szolnok)
99	FW	HUN	Attila Simon (to Pécs)

- List of Hungarian football transfers summer 2012
- List of Hungarian football transfers winter 2012–13

== Statistics ==
=== Appearances and goals ===
Last updated on 2 June 2013.

No.	Pos	Nat	Player	Total		OTP Bank Liga		Hungarian Cup		League Cup	
No.	Pos	Nat	Player	Apps	Goals	Apps	Goals	Apps	Goals	Apps	Goals
1	GK	(Hungary) HUN	Gábor Németh	4	-7	4	-7	0	0	0	0
6	DF	(Hungary) HUN	Tamás Sifter	29	1	25	0	1	0	3	1
7	MF	(Hungary) HUN	Tamás Báló	20	0	14	0	3	0	3	0
8	DF	(Hungary) HUN	Gábor Kovács	12	0	12	0	0	0	0	0
10	MF	(Hungary) HUN	Tamás Kiss	9	1	7	1	0	0	2	0
11	MF	(Hungary) HUN	Gábor Vayer	27	3	21	1	3	1	3	1
16	MF	(Hungary) HUN	Tibor Heffler	35	0	29	0	3	0	3	0
17	DF	(Hungary) HUN	Dániel Juhász	3	0	3	0	0	0	0	0
18	DF	(Hungary) HUN	Attila Fiola	33	2	26	0	4	2	3	0
19	DF	(Hungary) HUN	István Mészáros	11	0	5	0	2	0	4	0
20	FW	(Hungary) HUN	János Lázok	25	10	21	9	2	0	2	1
21	MF	(Hungary) HUN	Gábor Bori	15	0	10	0	3	0	2	0
24	GK	(Hungary) HUN	Norbert Csernyánszki	25	-24	21	-22	2	-1	2	-1
25	DF	(Hungary) HUN	Márton Eppel	30	5	23	4	2	0	5	1
27	MF	(Hungary) HUN	Norbert Heffler	29	2	21	1	2	0	6	1
30	DF	(Hungary) HUN	János Szabó	32	0	25	0	2	0	5	0
33	DF	(Hungary) HUN	József Zsók	3	0	1	0	0	0	2	0
39	FW	(Hungary) HUN	László Bartha	33	2	26	2	2	0	5	0
42	FW	(Serbia) SRB	Norbert Könyves	11	1	11	1	0	0	0	0
55	FW	(Hungary) HUN	Attila Tököli	31	6	26	6	3	0	2	0
63	DF	(Hungary) HUN	László Éger	37	2	28	2	4	0	5	0
77	MF	(Hungary) HUN	Dávid Kulcsár	23	1	16	1	2	0	5	0
89	FW	(Hungary) HUN	Roland Pap	3	1	3	1	0	0	0	0
95	FW	(Hungary) HUN	János Hahn	9	0	3	0	2	0	4	0
Youth players:
20	MF	(Hungary) HUN	Norbert Pintér	1	0	0	0	1	0	0	0
26	FW	(Hungary) HUN	Máté Feil	2	0	0	0	1	0	1	0
27	MF	(Hungary) HUN	Patrik Bagó	1	0	0	0	1	0	0	0
30	DF	(Hungary) HUN	Ádám Berkó	1	0	0	0	1	0	0	0
Players no longer at the club:
1	GK	(Hungary) HUN	Attila Kovács	4	-6	0	0	1	-3	3	-3
9	DF	(Hungary) HUN	Tamás Csehi	13	0	8	0	2	0	3	0
22	MF	(Hungary) HUN	István Sipeki	17	1	9	1	3	0	5	0
28	GK	(Hungary) HUN	Péter Pokorni	8	-15	5	-9	1	-4	2	-2
99	FW	(Hungary) HUN	Attila Simon	22	12	15	7	3	3	4	2

=== Top scorers ===
Includes all competitive matches. The list is sorted by shirt number when total goals are equal.

Last updated on 2 June 2013

Position	Nation	Number	Name	OTP Bank Liga	Hungarian Cup	League Cup	Total
1	(Hungary)	99	Attila Simon	7	3	2	12
2	(Hungary)	20	János Lázok	9	0	1	10
3	(Hungary)	55	Attila Tököli	6	0	0	6
4	(Hungary)	25	Márton Eppel	4	0	1	5
5	(Hungary)	11	Gábor Vayer	1	1	1	3
6	(Hungary)	63	László Éger	2	0	0	2
7	(Hungary)	39	László Bartha	2	0	0	2
8	(Hungary)	27	Norbert Heffler	1	0	1	2
9	(Hungary)	18	Attila Fiola	0	2	0	2
10	(Hungary)	10	Tamás Kiss	1	0	0	1
11	(Hungary)	22	István Sipeki	1	0	0	1
12	(Hungary)	77	Dávid Kulcsár	1	0	0	1
13	(Hungary)	89	Roland Pap	1	0	0	1
14	(Serbia)	42	Norbert Könyves	1	0	0	1
15	(Hungary)	6	Tamás Sifter	0	0	1	1
/	/	/	Own Goals	3	0	0	3
			TOTALS	40	6	7	53

=== Disciplinary record ===
Includes all competitive matches. Players with 1 card or more included only.

Last updated on 2 June 2013

Position	Nation	Number	Name	OTP Bank Liga		Hungarian Cup		League Cup		Total (Hu Total)	
Position	Nation	Number	Name	Yellow card	Red card	Yellow card	Red card	Yellow card	Red card	Yellow card	Red card
DF	(Hungary)	6	Tamás Sifter	6	0	0	0	1	0	7 (6)	0 (0)
MF	(Hungary)	7	Tamás Báló	5	0	1	0	1	0	7 (5)	0 (0)
DF	(Hungary)	8	Gábor Kovács	1	0	0	0	0	0	1 (1)	0 (0)
MF	(Hungary)	11	Gábor Vayer	2	0	0	0	0	0	2 (2)	0 (0)
MF	(Hungary)	16	Tibor Heffler	3	0	0	0	0	0	3 (3)	0 (0)
DF	(Hungary)	17	Dániel Juhász	1	0	0	0	0	0	1 (1)	0 (0)
DF	(Hungary)	18	Attila Fiola	11	2	1	0	1	0	13 (11)	2 (2)
DF	(Hungary)	19	István Mészáros	0	1	0	0	1	0	1 (0)	1 (1)
FW	(Hungary)	20	János Lázok	7	1	0	0	0	0	7 (7)	1 (1)
MF	(Hungary)	21	Gábor Bori	1	0	0	0	0	0	1 (1)	0 (0)
MF	(Hungary)	22	István Sipeki	1	0	1	0	0	0	2 (1)	0 (0)
GK	(Hungary)	24	Norbert Csernyánszki	0	0	0	0	0	1	0 (0)	1 (0)
DF	(Hungary)	25	Márton Eppel	3	0	0	0	2	1	5 (3)	1 (0)
MF	(Hungary)	27	Norbert Heffler	3	0	0	0	1	0	4 (3)	0 (0)
DF	(Hungary)	30	János Szabó	8	1	0	1	1	0	9 (8)	2 (1)
DF	(Hungary)	33	József Zsók	1	0	0	0	0	0	1 (1)	0 (0)
MF	(Hungary)	39	László Bartha	4	0	1	0	1	0	6 (4)	0 (0)
FW	(Serbia)	42	Norbert Könyves	4	0	0	0	0	0	4 (4)	0 (0)
FW	(Hungary)	55	Attila Tököli	3	0	0	0	0	0	3 (3)	0 (0)
DF	(Hungary)	63	László Éger	8	0	0	0	0	0	8 (8)	0 (0)
MF	(Hungary)	77	Dávid Kulcsár	5	0	0	0	0	0	5 (5)	0 (0)
FW	(Hungary)	99	Attila Simon	3	0	0	0	1	0	4 (3)	0 (0)
			TOTALS	80	5	4	1	10	2	94 (80)	8 (5)

=== Overall ===
Games played	40 (30 OTP Bank Liga, 4 Hungarian Cup and 6 Hungarian League Cup)
Games won	12 (8 OTP Bank Liga, 2 Hungarian Cup and 2 Hungarian League Cup)
Games drawn	13 (11 OTP Bank Liga, 0 Hungarian Cup and 2 Hungarian League Cup)
Games lost	15 (11 OTP Bank Liga, 2 Hungarian Cup and 2 Hungarian League Cup)
Goals scored	53
Goals conceded	52
Goal difference	+1
Yellow cards	94
Red cards	8
Worst discipline	(Hungary) Attila Fiola (13 (yellow card) , 2 (red card) )
Best result	6–0 (A) v Újpest FC - OTP Bank Liga - 02-03-2013
Worst result	0–4 (A) v Győri ETO FC - Hungarian Cup - 20-11-2012
Most appearances	(Hungary) László Éger (37 appearances)
Top scorer	(Hungary) Attila Simon (12 goal)
Points	49/120 (40.83%)

Last updated: 2 June 2013

== Nemzeti Bajnokság I ==
=== Matches ===
28 July 2012 1	Paks	2–3	Pécs	Paks, Tolna County
17:00 CEST	Simon 37'; Heffler 71'	(Report)	Wittrédi 31'; Grumić 36'; Zeljkovič 90+2'	Stadium: Stadion PSE; Attendance: 1,500; Referee: (Hungary) Dániel Becséri

3 August 2012 2	Pápa	0–0	Paks	Pápa, Veszprém County
17:00 CEST		(Report)		Stadium: Stadion Várkerti; Attendance: 2,000; Referee: (Hungary) Gergely Szőts

12 August 2012 3	Paks	2–2	Újpest	Paks, Tolna County
18:30 CEST	Simon 23'; Éger 39'	(Report)	Zaris 19'; Remili 55'	Stadium: Stadion PSE; Attendance: 3,000; Referee: (Hungary) József Erdős

19 August 2012 4	Budapest Honvéd	3–3	Paks	Budapest, Pest County
16:30 CEST	Živanović 16'; Vernes 62'; Délczeg 66'	(Report)	Kiss 8'; Simon 34'; Sipeki 45'	Stadium: Bozsik Stadion; Attendance: 1,500; Referee: (Hungary) Péter Solymosi

24 August 2012 5	Paks	0–1	Eger	Paks, Tolna County
17:00 CEST		(Report)	Pavlov 84'	Stadium: Stadion PSE; Attendance: 1,500; Referee: (Hungary) István Vad

1 September 2012 6	Szombathely	1–2	Paks	Szombathely, Vas County
16:00 CEST	Kenesei 18'	(Report)	Lázok 40'; Rajos 68' (o.g.)	Stadium: Rohonci úti Stadion; Attendance: 4,500; Referee: (Hungary) Balázs Böcskei

15 September 2012 7	Paks	4–1	Siófok	Paks, Tolna County
16:00 CEST	Vayer 73'; Simon 74', 79', 87'	(Report)	Pál 90+2' (pen.)	Stadium: Stadion PSE; Attendance: 1,500; Referee: (Hungary) Szabolcs Szilasi

21 September 2012 8	Diósgyőr	1–0	Paks	Miskolc, Borsod-Abaúj-Zemplén County
19:00 CEST	Bacsa 4'	(Report)		Stadium: DVTK Stadion; Attendance: 7,000; Referee: (Hungary) Tamás Bognár

29 September 2012 9	Paks	1–1	Videoton	Paks, Tolna County
18:30 CEST	Tököli 8'	(Report)	Kovács 76'	Stadium: Stadion PSE; Attendance: 2,000; Referee: (Hungary) Zsolt Szabó

6 October 2012 10	Paks	0–0	Győr	Paks, Tolna County
16:00 CEST		(Report)		Stadium: Stadion PSE; Attendance: 1,500; Referee: (Hungary) Viktor Kassai

19 October 2012 11	Ferencváros	2–2	Paks	Budapest, Pest County
19:00 CEST	Ionescu 40'; Gyömbér 88'	(Report)	Simon 54'; Jovanović 85' (o.g.)	Stadium: Stadion Albert Flórián; Attendance: 4,000; Referee: (Hungary) Péter Solymosi

27 October 2012 12	Paks	0–0	MTK Budapest	Paks, Tolna County
18:30 CEST		(Report)		Stadium: Stadion PSE; Attendance: 1,000; Referee: (Hungary) Sándor Andó-Szabó

3 November 2012 13	Debrecen	0–1	Paks	Debrecen, Hajdú-Bihar County
18:30 CET		(Report)	Tököli 63'	Stadium: Stadion Oláh Gábor Út; Attendance: 5,000; Referee: (Hungary) Szabolcs Szilasi

10 November 2012 14	Paks	1–2	Kaposvár	Paks, Tolna County
16:00 CET	Lázok 43'	(Report)	Oláh 47' (pen.); Balázs 50'	Stadium: Stadion PSE; Attendance: 500; Referee: (Hungary) Ádám Radványi

17 November 2012 15	Kecskemét	1–1	Paks	Kecskemét, Bács-Kiskun County
16:00 CET	Pekár 90'	(Report)	Vaskó 16' (o.g.)	Stadium: Széktói Stadion; Attendance: 2,433; Referee: (Hungary) Ádám Németh

23 November 2012 16	Pécs	1–3	Paks	Pécs, Baranya County
19:00 CET	Bajzát 90'	(Report)	Eppel 34', 69'; Kulcsár 38'	Stadium: Stadion PMFC; Attendance: 3,000; Referee: (Hungary) Roland Veizer

30 November 2012 17	Paks	2–0	Pápa	Paks, Tolna County
19:00 CET	Eppel 31'; Tököli 84'	(Report)		Stadium: Stadion PSE; Attendance: 750; Referee: (Hungary) Dániel Becséri

2 March 2013 18	Újpest	0–6	Paks	Budapest, Pest County
16:00 CET		(Report)	Lázok 16' (pen.), 36', 70', 78'; Tököli 39', 81'	Stadium: Szusza Ferenc Stadium; Attendance: 2,717; Referee: (Hungary) Dániel Becséri

8 March 2013 19	Paks	0–3	Budapest Honvéd	Paks, Tolna County
17:00 CET		(Report)	Vécsei 4', 12'; Vernes 35'	Stadium: Stadion PSE; Attendance: 1,500; Referee: (Hungary) Zoltán Iványi

9 April 2013 20	Eger	2–2	Paks	Vác, Pest County
16:00 CEST	Horváth 12'; Koós 35'	(Report)	Pap 67'; Éger 79' (pen.)	Stadium: Stadion Városi Vác; Attendance: 100; Referee: (Hungary) József Erdős

30 March 2013 21	Paks	0–0	Szombathely	Paks, Tolna County
15:00 CET		(Report)		Stadium: Stadion PSE; Attendance: 600; Referee: (Hungary) Viktor Kassai

6 April 2013 22	Siófok	1–1	Paks	Siófok, Somogy County
14:00 CEST	Pál 23'	(Report)	Lázok 28'	Stadium: Révész Street Stadium; Attendance: 200; Referee: (Hungary) Péter Solymosi

12 April 2013 23	Paks	1–0	Diósgyőr	Paks, Tolna County
19:00 CEST	Tököli 11'	(Report)		Stadium: Stadion PSE; Attendance: 1,100; Referee: (Hungary) István Vad

20 April 2013 24	Videoton	2–0	Paks	Székesfehérvár, Fejér County
16:00 CEST	Gyurcsó 25'; Caneira 68'	(Report)		Stadium: Stadion Sóstói; Attendance: 2,700; Referee: (Hungary) Tamás Bognár

26 April 2013 25	Győr	3–4	Paks	Győr, Győr-Moson-Sopron County
19:00 CEST	Völgyi 10'; Střeštík 30'; Kamber 39'	(Report)	Bartha 55'; Lázok 67'; Eppel 78'; Könyves 90'	Stadium: ETO Park; Attendance: 3,500; Referee: (Hungary) Zoltán Iványi

5 May 2013 26	Paks	1–3	Ferencváros	Paks, Tolna County
18:30 CEST	Lázok 88' (pen.)	(Report)	Leonardo 45'; Bešić 66'; Klein 73'	Stadium: Stadion PSE; Attendance: 5,000; Referee: (Hungary) Sándor Andó-Szabó

10 May 2013 27	MTK Budapest	1–0	Paks	Budapest, Pest County
17:00 CEST	Pölöskei 86'	(Report)		Stadium: Hidegkuti Nándor Stadium; Attendance: 200; Referee: (Hungary) Viktor Kassai

17 May 2013 28	Paks	1–2	Debrecen	Paks, Tolna County
19:00 CEST	Bartha 33'	(Report)	Korhut 53'; Mészáros 86'	Stadium: Stadion PSE; Attendance: 1,000; Referee: (Hungary) Ádám Farkas

25 May 2013 29	Kaposvár	1–0	Paks	Kaposvár, Somogy County
14:00 CEST	Balázs 36'	(Report)		Stadium: Stadion Kaposvár Rákóczi; Attendance: 1,000; Referee: (Hungary) Mihály Fábián

31 May 2013 30	Paks	0–1	Kecskemét	Paks, Tolna County
17:00 CEST		(Report)	Bertus 71'	Stadium: Stadion PSE; Attendance: 500; Referee: (Hungary) Péter Solymosi

=== Classification ===
Pos	Team	Pld	W	D	L	GF	GA	GD	Pts	Qualification or relegation
11	Kaposvári Rákóczi	30	10	7	13	35	38	−3	37	
12	Pécs	30	10	7	13	33	44	−11	37	
13	Paks	30	8	11	11	40	38	+2	35	
14	Pápa	30	7	7	16	26	46	−20	28	
15	Siófok (R)	30	7	4	19	31	61	−30	25	Relegation to Nemzeti Bajnokság II

Source: mlsz.hu (in Hungarian)
Rules for classification: 1st points; 2nd overall wins; 3rd goal difference; 4th head-to-head points; 5th head-to-head goal difference; 6th head-to-head away goals scored; 7th fair-play points; 8th drawing of lots
(R) Relegated

=== Results summary ===
Overall								Home						Away					
Pld	W	D	L	GF	GA	GD	Pts	W	D	L	GF	GA	GD	W	D	L	GF	GA	GD
30	8	11	11	40	38	+2	35	3	5	7	15	19	−4	5	6	4	25	19	+6

Last updated: 2 June 2013.
Source: NB1

=== Results by round ===
Round	1	2	3	4	5	6	7	8	9	10	11	12	13	14	15	16	17	18	19	20	21	22	23	24	25	26	27	28	29	30
Ground	H	A	H	A	H	A	H	A	H	H	A	H	A	H	A	A	H	A	H	A	H	A	H	A	A	H	A	H	A	H
Result	L	D	D	D	L	W	W	L	D	D	D	D	W	L	D	W	W	W	L	D	D	D	W	L	W	L	L	L	L	L
Position	11	12	11	12	13	10	7	9	10	12	14	14	13	14	14	13	9	7	8	9	9	11	8	11	9	9	10	11	12	13

Updated to match(es) played on 2 June 2013. Source: Matches
A = Away; H = Home; W = Win; D = Draw; L = Loss

== Hungarian Cup ==
26 September 2012 Round 2	Veszprém	0–2	Paks	Veszprém, Veszprém County
15:30 CEST		(Report)	Vayer 42'; Simon 64'	Stadium: Városi Stadion; Attendance: 200; Referee: (Hungary) Krisztián Pánczél

31 October 2012 Round 3	Rákospalota	1–2	Paks	Budapest, Pest County
17:00 CET	Buzás 23'	(Report)	Fiola 13', 18'	Stadium: Stadion Budai II. Laszló; Attendance: 250; Referee: (Hungary) Balázs Böcskei

20 November 2012 Round of 16 (1st leg)	Győr	4–0	Paks	Győr, Győr-Moson-Sopron County
16:30 CET	Dinjar 6' (pen.); Dudás 47', 76'; Pátkai 72'	(Report)		Stadium: ETO Park; Attendance: 1,000; Referee: (Hungary) Ádám Farkas

27 November 2012 Round of 16 (2nd leg)	Paksi SE	2–3 (2–7 agg.)	Győri ETO FC	Paks, Tolna County
15:00	Simon 19', 23'	(Report)	Kronaveter 8', 45'; Dudás 80'	Stadium: Stadion PSE; Attendance: 200; Referee: (Hungary) Zoltán Iványi

== League Cup ==
=== Group stage ===
5 September 2012 1	Paks	2–1	Pécs	Paks, Tolna County
16:00 CEST	Sifter 14'; Vayer 53' (pen.)	(Report)	Lantos 9'	Stadium: Stadion PSE; Attendance: 200; Referee: (Hungary) Zoltán J. Kovács

12 September 2012 2	Vasas	1–0	Paks	Budapest, Pest County
17:30 CEST	Füredi 55' (pen.)	(Report)		Stadium: Stadion Rudolf Illovszky; Attendance: 300; Referee: (Hungary) Róbert Nagy

10 October 2012 3	Siófok	0–0	Paks	Siófok, Somogy County
15:00 CEST		(Report)		Stadium: Révész Street Stadium; Attendance: 100; Referee: (Hungary) Csaba Pintér

13 October 2012 4	Paks	1–1	Siófok	Paks, Tolna County
14:00 CEST	Lázok 76'	(Report)	Sluka 26'	Stadium: Stadion PSE; Attendance: 150; Referee: (Hungary) Gergely Szőts

13 November 2012 5	Paks	4–1	Vasas	Paks, Tolna County
13:30 CET	Simon 32' (pen.), 59'; Eppel 53'; Heffler 75'	(Report)	Füredi 16' (pen.)	Stadium: Stadion PSE; Attendance: 100; Referee: (Hungary) József Berger

5 December 2012 6	Pécs	2–0	Paks	Pécs, Baranya County
13:00 CET	Wittrédi 8' (pen.); Grumić 73'	(Report)		Stadium: Stadion PMFC; Attendance: 70; Referee: (Hungary) Gábor Oláh

==== Classification ====
Pos	Team	Pld	W	D	L	GF	GA	GD	Pts	Qualification
1	Pécs	6	3	2	1	11	6	+5	11	Advance to knockout phase
2	Paks	6	2	2	2	7	6	+1	8	
3	Vasas	6	2	1	3	5	9	−4	7	
4	Siófok	6	1	3	2	5	7	−2	6	

Rules for classification: 1) points; 2) goal difference; 3) number of goals scored.
