= 2010–11 Paksi FC season =

Paks
2010–11 season
- Chairman: János Süli
- Manager: Károly Kis
- Nemzeti Bajnokság I: 2nd
- Hungarian Cup: Round of 16
- Hungarian League Cup: Quarter-finals

The 2010–11 season was Paksi Football Club's 5th competitive season, 5th consecutive season in the Nemzeti Bajnokság I and 58th year in existence as a football club.In addition to the domestic league, Paks participate in this season's editions of the Hungarian Cup and Hungarian League Cup.

== Team kit ==
The team kits for the 2010–11 season are produced by Jako and sponsored by MvM Paksi Atomerőmű. The home kit is green and white colour and the away kit is white and green colour.

Home	Away

== Club ==
=== Coaching staff ===
Position	Staff
Manager	(Hungary) Károly Kis
Assistant managers	(Hungary) Norbert Péter
First team fitness coach	(Hungary) Csaba Máté
Goalkeeping coach	(Hungary) János Heizler
Club doctor	(Hungary) Dr. András Kis-Miki
Masseur	(Hungary) László Váczi
Masseur	(Hungary) László Varga

Last updated: 4 August 2010

=== Other information ===
General Manager	(Hungary) János Süli
Marketing Director	(Hungary) Judit Balog
Technical Leader	(Hungary) Zsolt Haraszti
Media Responsible	(Hungary) Zoltán Zomborka
Communicational Headmaster	(Hungary) Ferenc Benedeczki
General Editor	(Hungary) József Karszt
Ground (capacity and dimensions)	Stadion PSE (4,000 / 110x68 meters)

Updated to match played 4 August 2010

== Transfers ==
=== Summer ===
In: Note: Flags indicate national team as defined under FIFA eligibility rules; some limited exceptions apply. Players may hold more than one non-FIFA nationality.

No.	Pos.	Nation	Player
6	MF	HUN	Tamás Sifter (from (Hungary) Videoton FC)
9	FW	HUN	Tamás Csehi (loan return from (Hungary) Szolnok)
12	MF	HUN	László Miskolczi (from (Hungary) Nyíregyháza)
53	FW	HUN	Tibor Montvai (from (Hungary) Kecskeméti TE)
63	FW	HUN	Norbert Palásthy (from (Hungary) Budapest Honvéd)
86	MF	HUN	Ádám Dudás (on loan from (Hungary) Győri ETO FC)

Out: Note: Flags indicate national team as defined under FIFA eligibility rules; some limited exceptions apply. Players may hold more than one non-FIFA nationality.

No.	Pos.	Nation	Player
9	FW	HUN	Gábor Urbán (loan return to (Hungary) MTK Budapest)
20	DF	HUN	Dániel Völgyi (loan return to (Hungary) Győri ETO FC)
21	FW	HUN	Attila Tököli (to (Hungary) Kecskeméti TE)

== Teams ==
=== First team squad ===
As of 17 October 2010

Note: Flags indicate national team as defined under FIFA eligibility rules; some limited exceptions apply. Players may hold more than one non-FIFA nationality.

No.	Pos.	Nation	Player
1	GK	HUN	Attila Kovács
2	MF	HUN	István Nagy
5	DF	HUN	Zsolt Gévay
6	MF	HUN	Tamás Sifter
7	MF	HUN	Tamás Báló
9	MF	HUN	Tamás Csehi
10	MF	HUN	Tamás Kiss
11	MF	HUN	Gábor Vayer
12	MF	HUN	László Miskolczi
13	MF	HUN	Dániel Böde
16	MF	HUN	Tibor Heffler
17	FW	HUN	József Magasföldi
18	DF	HUN	Attila Fiola

No.	Pos.	Nation	Player
19	MF	HUN	István Mészáros
22	MF	HUN	István Sipeki
24	GK	HUN	Norbert Csernyánszki
30	DF	HUN	János Szabó
33	MF	HUN	Krisztián Lisztes
37	MF	HUN	Balázs Tóth B.
39	FW	HUN	László Bartha
53	FW	HUN	Tibor Montvai
63	FW	HUN	Norbert Palásthy
73	DF	HUN	László Éger
86	MF	HUN	Ádám Dudás
87	FW	HUN	Barnabás Vári
91	FW	HUN	Zsolt Haraszti

== Statistics ==
=== Appearances and goals ===
Last updated on 23 November 2010.

No.	Pos	Nat	Player	Total		NB 1		Hungarian Cup		League Cup	
No.	Pos	Nat	Player	Apps	Goals	Apps	Goals	Apps	Goals	Apps	Goals
1	GK	(Hungary) HUN	Attila Kovács	7	-9	2	-4	2	0	3	-5
2	MF	(Hungary) HUN	István Nagy	3	2	1	0	1	1	1	1
3	MF	(Hungary) HUN	Norbert Pintér	1	0	0	0	0	0	1	0
4	MF	(Hungary) HUN	Attila Cziráki	1	0	0	0	0	0	1	0
5	DF	(Hungary) HUN	Zsolt Gévay	4	2	1	0	1	2	2	0
6	MF	(Hungary) HUN	Tamás Sifter	16	1	14	1	1	0	1	0
7	MF	(Hungary) HUN	Tamás Báló	11	0	6	0	2	0	3	0
8	FW	(Hungary) HUN	Roland Bohner	3	1	0	0	1	0	2	1
9	MF	(Hungary) HUN	Tamás Csehi	17	0	15	0	1	0	1	0
10	MF	(Hungary) HUN	Tamás Kiss	17	2	15	2	1	0	1	0
11	MF	(Hungary) HUN	Gábor Vayer	15	3	13	3	1	0	1	0
12	MF	(Hungary) HUN	László Miskolczi	4	0	3	0	0	0	1	0
13	MF	(Hungary) HUN	Dániel Böde	14	5	12	5	1	0	1	0
14	DF	(Hungary) HUN	Ádám Berkó	1	0	0	0	0	0	1	0
16	MF	(Hungary) HUN	Tibor Heffler	17	2	15	2	1	0	1	0
17	FW	(Hungary) HUN	József Magasföldi	13	0	9	0	2	0	2	0
18	DF	(Hungary) HUN	Attila Fiola	15	0	13	0	1	0	1	0
19	MF	(Hungary) HUN	István Mészáros	5	0	1	0	1	0	3	0
22	MF	(Hungary) HUN	István Sipeki	14	1	13	1	1	0	0	0
24	GK	(Hungary) HUN	Norbert Csernyánszki	14	-16	14	-16	0	0	0	0
30	DF	(Hungary) HUN	János Szabó	10	0	6	0	2	0	2	0
33	MF	(Hungary) HUN	Krisztián Lisztes	11	3	6	0	2	0	3	3
37	MF	(Hungary) HUN	Balázs Tóth	2	1	1	0	0	0	1	1
39	FW	(Hungary) HUN	László Bartha	17	5	15	4	1	0	1	1
53	FW	(Hungary) HUN	Tibor Montvai	16	5	14	5	1	0	1	0
63	FW	(Hungary) HUN	Norbert Palásthy	1	0	1	0	0	0	0	0
73	DF	(Hungary) HUN	László Éger	14	3	12	2	1	1	1	0
86	MF	(Hungary) HUN	Ádám Dudás	3	1	1	0	1	1	1	0
87	FW	(Hungary) HUN	Barnabás Vári	5	1	2	0	1	0	2	1
89	MF	(Hungary) HUN	Roland Pap	2	0	0	0	0	0	2	0
91	FW	(Hungary) HUN	Zsolt Haraszti	4	0	1	0	1	0	2	0

=== Top scorers ===
Includes all competitive matches. The list is sorted by shirt number when total goals are equal.

Last updated on 23 November 2010

Position	Nation	Number	Name	Soproni Liga	Hungarian Cup	League Cup	Total
1	(Hungary)	53	Tibor Montvai	5	0	0	5
2	(Hungary)	13	Dániel Böde	5	0	0	5
3	(Hungary)	39	László Bartha	4	0	1	5
4	(Hungary)	11	Gábor Vayer	3	0	0	3
5	(Hungary)	73	László Éger	2	1	0	3
6	(Hungary)	33	Krisztián Lisztes	0	0	3	3
7	(Hungary)	16	Tibor Heffler	2	0	0	2
8	(Hungary)	10	Tamás Kiss	2	0	0	2
9	(Hungary)	5	Zsolt Gévay	0	2	0	2
10	(Hungary)	2	István Nagy	0	1	1	2
11	(Hungary)	22	István Sipeki	1	0	0	1
12	(Hungary)	6	Tamás Sifter	1	0	0	1
13	(Hungary)	86	Ádám Dudás	0	1	0	1
14	(Hungary)	2	Balázs Tóth B.	0	0	1	1
15	(Hungary)	8	Roland Bohner	0	0	1	1
16	(Hungary)	87	Barnabás Vári	0	0	1	1
/	/	/	Own Goals	0	0	0	0
			TOTALS	25	5	8	38

=== Disciplinary record ===
Includes all competitive matches. Players with 1 card or more included only.

Last updated on 23 November 2010

Position	Nation	Number	Name	Soproni Liga		Hungarian Cup		League Cup		Total (Hu Total)	
Position	Nation	Number	Name	Yellow card	Red card	Yellow card	Red card	Yellow card	Red card	Yellow card	Red card
DF	(Hungary)	5	Zsolt Gévay	0	0	0	0	1	0	1 (0)	0 (0)
MF	(Hungary)	6	Tamás Sifter	4	0	0	0	0	0	4 (4)	0 (0)
MF	(Hungary)	9	Tamás Csehi	2	0	0	0	0	0	2 (2)	0 (0)
MF	(Hungary)	10	Tamás Kiss	2	0	0	0	0	0	2 (2)	0 (0)
MF	(Hungary)	13	Dániel Böde	1	0	0	0	0	0	1 (1)	0 (0)
MF	(Hungary)	16	Tibor Heffler	1	0	0	0	0	0	1 (1)	0 (0)
FW	(Hungary)	17	József Magasföldi	1	1	0	0	0	0	1 (1)	1 (1)
DF	(Hungary)	18	Attila Fiola	3	0	0	0	1	0	4 (3)	0 (0)
MF	(Hungary)	22	István Sipeki	1	0	0	0	0	0	1 (1)	0 (0)
GK	(Hungary)	24	N. Csernyánszki	1	0	0	0	0	0	1 (1)	0 (0)
DF	(Hungary)	30	János Szabó	0	0	1	0	1	0	2 (0)	0 (0)
FW	(Hungary)	39	László Bartha	4	0	0	0	0	0	4 (4)	0 (0)
FW	(Hungary)	53	Tibor Montvai	1	0	0	0	0	0	1 (1)	0 (0)
DF	(Hungary)	73	László Éger	2	0	0	0	0	0	2 (2)	0 (0)
			TOTALS	22	1	1	0	3	0	26 (22)	1 (1)

=== Overall ===
Games played	20 (15 Soproni Liga, 2 Hungarian Cup and 3 Hungarian League Cup)
Games won	11 (7 Soproni Liga, 2 Hungarian Cup and 2 Hungarian League Cup)
Games drawn	4 (4 Soproni Liga, 0 Hungarian Cup and 0 Hungarian League Cup)
Games lost	5 (4 Soproni Liga, 0 Hungarian Cup and 1 Hungarian League Cup)
Goals scored	38
Goals conceded	25
Goal difference	+13
Yellow cards	26
Red cards	1
Worst discipline	(Hungary) Attila Fiola (4 (yellow card) , 0 (red card) )
Worst discipline	(Hungary) Tamás Sifter (4 (yellow card) , 0 (red card) )
Worst discipline	(Hungary) László Bartha (4 (yellow card) , 0 (red card) )
Best result	4–0 (A) v Balatonlelle SE – Hungarian Cup – 22-09-2010
Best result	4–0 (H) v Lombard-Pápa TFC – Nemzeti Bajnokság I – 09-10-2010
Worst result	1–3 (A) v Szolnoki MÁV FC – Nemzeti Bajnokság I – 14-08-2010
Worst result	2–4 (A) v MTK Budapest FC – Hungarian League Cup – 24-07-2010
Most appearances	(Hungary) Tamás Csehi (17 appearances)
Most appearances	(Hungary) Tamás Kiss (17 appearances)
Most appearances	(Hungary) Tibor Heffler (17 appearances)
Most appearances	(Hungary) László Bartha (17 appearances)
Top scorer	(Hungary) Tibor Montvai (5 goals)
Top scorer	(Hungary) László Bartha (5 goals)
Top scorer	(Hungary) Dániel Böde (5 goals)
Points	37/60 (61.67%)

Last updated: 23 November 2010

== Nemzeti Bajnokság I ==
=== Classification ===
Pos	Team	Pld	W	D	L	GF	GA	GD	Pts	Qualification or relegation
1	Videoton (C)	30	18	7	5	59	29	+30	61	Qualification for Champions League second qualifying round
2	Paks	30	17	5	8	54	37	+17	56	Qualification for Europa League first qualifying round
3	Ferencváros	30	15	5	10	50	43	+7	50	Qualification for Europa League first qualifying round
4	ZTE	30	14	6	10	51	47	+4	48	
5	Debrecen	30	12	10	8	53	43	+10	46	

Source: soccerway.com
Rules for classification: 1st points; 2nd overall wins; 3rd goal difference; 4th goals scored
(C) Champions

=== Results summary ===
Overall								Home						Away					
Pld	W	D	L	GF	GA	GD	Pts	W	D	L	GF	GA	GD	W	D	L	GF	GA	GD
15	7	4	4	25	20	+5	25	2	4	1	11	7	+4	5	0	3	14	13	+1

Last updated: 20 November 2010.
Source: NB1

=== Results by round ===
Round	1	2	3	4	5	6	7	8	9	10	11	12	13	14	15	16	17	18	19	20	21	22	23	24	25	26	27	28	29	30
Ground	A	H	A	H	A	H	A	A	H	A	H	A	H	A	H	H	A	H	A	H	A	H	H	A	H	A	H	A	H	A
Result	L	D	L	D	W	W	W	W	L	L	W	W	D	W	D															
Position	13	11	14	15	9	9	6	3	6	9	6	5	6	5	6															

Updated to match(es) played on 20 November 2010. Source: Matches
A = Away; H = Home; W = Win; D = Draw; L = Loss

=== Matches ===
30 July 2010
19:00 CEST

Ferencvárosi TC	2 – 1 (2–1)	Paksi SE
Heinz 10'; Tutorić (yellow card) 31'; J. Szabó 33' (o.g.); B. Tóth (yellow card) 38'; Csizmadia (yellow card) 68'	(Report)	Bartha 8' (yellow card) 84'

Stadion Albert Flórián, Budapest
Attendance: 5,500
Referee: Zsolt Szabó
- Ferencvárosi TC: Ranilovic – Stockley, Csizmadia, Tutoric, Junior – Andrezinho (Abdi 69.), Maróti, Stanic (Rodenbücher 86.), Rósa, B. Tóth (D. Kulcsár 79.) – Heinz. Coach: László Prukner.
- Paksi SE: A. Kovács – Sifter, Fiola, J. Szabó, Csehi – Bartha (Miskolczi 86.), T. Heffler, Sipeki (Palásthy 82.), Lisztes (T. Kiss 68.), Vayer – Montvai. Coach: Károly Kis.
- G.: Heinz (10.), J. Szabó (33. – o.g.) – Bartha (8.)
- Y.: Tutoric (31.), B. Tóth (38.), Csizmadia (68.) – Bartha (84.)

8 August 2010
17:30 CEST

Paksi SE	2 – 2 (1–2)	Debreceni VSC
Montvai 5'; Fiola (yellow card) 16'; T. Heffler 84' (pen.); Bartha (yellow card) 87'	(Report)	Kabát 4'; Yannick (red card) 21'; Šimac 40'; Komlósi (yellow card) 54'; Ramos (yellow card) 83'

Stadion PSE, Paks
Attendance: 3,000
Referee: Szabolcs Szilasi
- Paksi SE: A. Kovács (Csernyánszki 46.) – Fiola, Sifter, J. Szabó, T. Csehi – Bartha, T. Heffler, Lisztes (Dudás 46.; Haraszti 78.), Sipeki – Montvai, T. Kiss. Coach: Károly Kis.
- Debreceni VSC: Malinauskas – Z. Nagy, Simac, Komlósi, Laczkó – Bódi, Ramos, P. Szakály (Spitzmüller 46.), Yannick – P. Szilágyi (B. Farkas 73.), Kabát (Coulibaly 65.). Coach: András Herczeg.
- G.: Montvai (5.), T. Heffler (84. – pen) – Kabát (4.), Simac (40.)
- Y.: Fiola (16.), Bartha (87.) – Komlósi (54.), Ramos (83.)
- R.: Yannick (21.)

14 August 2010
17:00 CEST

Szolnoki MÁV FC	3 – 1 (2–0)	Paksi SE
Alex 23'; Remili 45' (pen.); Pisanjuk (yellow card) 45'; Lengyel (yellow card) 77' (goal) 90+2'	(Report)	Sipeki (yellow card) 52' (goal) 63'

Tiszaligeti Stadion, Szolnok
Attendance: 2,500
Referee: Zoltán J. Kovács
- Szolnoki MÁV FC: Tarczy – Schindler, Hegedűs, Pető (Vörös 46.), Hevesi-Tóth – Búrány, Molnár, Tchami (Koós 64.), Remili – Alex (Lengyel 73.), Pisanjuk. Coach: Attila Vágó.
- Paksi SE: Csernyánszki – Sifter, Éger, Fiola, Csehi (Gévay 46.) – Bartha (Tóth 74.), Böde (Lisztes 12.), Sipeki, Heffler – Montvai, Kiss. Coach: Károly Kis.
- G.: Alex (23.), Remili (45. – pen.), Lengyel (92.) – Sipeki (63.)
- Y.: Pisanjuk (45.), Lengyel (77.) – Sipeki (52.)

21 August 2010
19:00 CEST

Paksi SE	2 – 2 (2–1)	Zalaegerszegi TE
Montvai 29'; Sifter (yellow card) 40'; Kiss 43'	(Report)	Kamber 13'; Kovács (yellow card) 39'; Rajcomar 47' (yellow card) 47'; Bogunović (yellow card) 53'

Stadion PSE, Paks
Attendance: 1,200
Referee: Gábor Oláh
- Paksi SE: Csernyánszki – Miskolczi, Éger, Fiola, Csehi – Bartha, Kiss, Sifter, Sipeki (Böde 70.), Heffler (Vayer 64.) – Montvai. Coach: Károly Kis.
- Zalaegerszegi TE: Vlaszák – Kovács, Bogunovic, Miljatovic, Varga – Szalai, Kamber (Horváth 82.), Máté, Magasföldi (Rajcomar 46.) – Pavicevic, Balázs (Illés 46.). Coach: János Csank.
- G.: Montvai (29.), Kiss (43.) – Kamber (13.), Rajcomar (47.)
- Y.: Sifter (40.) – Kovács (39.), Rajcomar (47.), Bogunovic (53.)

28 August 2010
19:00 CEST

Szombathelyi Haladás	1 – 2 (1–1)	Paksi SE
Kenesei 40'	(Report)	Sifter (yellow card) 2' (goal) 29'; Bartha (yellow card) 12'; Heffler (yellow card) 82'; Vayer 89'; Magasföldi (yellow card) 90'

Rohonci úti Stadion, Szombathely
Attendance: 1,800
Referee: Ádám Németh
- Szombathelyi Haladás: Rózsa – Schimmer, Guzmics, Lengyel, Tóth – Rajos, Korolovszky, Á. Simon – Ugrai (Rócz 56.), Kenesei (A. Simon 79.), Oross. Coach: Aurél Csertői.
- Paksi SE: Csernyánszki – Fiola, Éger, Sifter, Csehi – Bartha (Magasföldi 60.), Sipeki, Heffler, Miskolczi (Vayer 23.) – Kiss, Montvai. Coach: Károly Kis.
- G.: Kenesei (40.) – Sifter (29.), Vayer (89.)
- Y.: Sifter (2.), Bartha (12.), Heffler (82.), Magasföldi (90.)

9 October 2010
19:00 CEST

Paksi SE	4 – 0 (1–0)	Lombard-Pápa TFC
Bartha 43' 87'; Vayer 49'; Montvai 68'	(Report)	Rajnay (yellow card) 26'; Rebryk (yellow card) 88'

Stadion PSE, Paks
Attendance: 500
Referee: Viktor Kassai
- Paksi SE: Csernyánszki – Sifter, Fiola, Éger (Böde 71.), Csehi – Heffler, Kiss (Mészáros 86.), Sipeki – Bartha (Báló 89.), Montvai, Vayer.. Coach: Károly Kis.
- Lombard-Pápa TFC: Szűcs – Rajnay, Bíró, Farkas, Takács – Quintero (Rebryk 51.), Gyömbér, Heffler – Abwo, Bárányos, Maric (Bali 80.). Coach: György Véber.
- G.: Bartha (43., 87.), Vayer (49.), Montvai (68.)
- Y.: Rajnay (26.), Rebryk (88.)

17 September 2010
17:00 CEST

Kaposvári Rákóczi FC	1 – 2 (1–0)	Paksi SE
Oláh 25' (pen.); Balázs (yellow card) 35'; Zsók (yellow card) 47'; Lelkes (yellow card) 57'	(Report)	Sifter (yellow card) 30'; Böde 61'; Éger (yellow card) 62'; Montvai 65'; Fiola (yellow card) 90+1'

Stadion Kaposvár Rákoczi, Kaposvár
Attendance: 1,500
Referee: Szabolcs Szilasi
- Kaposvári Rákóczi FC: Kovács – Lelkes, Grúz (Zahorecz 67.), Zsók, Gujic – Szepessy (Kulcsár 75.), Pedro, Hegedűs, Balázs (Zsolnai 62.) – Oláh, Jawad. Coach: Tibor Sisa.
- Paksi SE: Csernyánszki – Fiola, Éger, Sifter (Szabó 65.), Ceehi – Bartha, Heffler, Sipeki (Böde 46.), Vayer – Montvai, Kiss (Magasföldi 85.). Coach: Károly Kis.
- G.: Oláh (25. – pen.) – Böde (61.), Montvai (65.)
- Y.: Balázs (35.), Zsók (47.), Lelkes (57.) – Sifter (30.), Éger (62.), Fiola (91.)

25 September 2010
18:00 CEST

Kecskeméti TE	0 – 1 (0–0)	Paksi SE
Alempijević (red card) 69'	(Report)	Fiola (yellow card) 44'; Böde (yellow card) 47'; Csehi (yellow card) 75'; Magasföldi (red card) 77'; Éger (yellow card) 79'; Montvai (yellow card) 82' (goal) 90+4'

Széktói Stadion, Kecskemét
Attendance: 3,000
Referee: Roland Veizer
- Kecskeméti TE: Rybánsky – Balogh (Wilson 85.), Gyagya, Lambulic, Mohl – Alempijevic, Cukic, Koncz – Litsingi (Csordás 56.), Tököli, Foxi (Bori 72.). Coach: István Urbányi.
- Paksi SE: Csernyánszki – Heffler (Lisztes 91.), Fiola, Éger, Csehi – Sipeki, Bartha, Böde, Vayer (Báló 74.) – Montvai, Kiss (Magasföldi 65.). Coach: Károly Kis.
- G.: Montvai (90.+4)
- Y.: Fiola (44.), Böde (47.), Csehi (75.), Éger (79.), Montvai (82.)
- R.: Alempijevic (69.) – Magasföldi (77.)

2 October 2010
18:00 CEST

Paksi SE	0 – 1 (0–0)	Budapest Honvéd FC
	(Report)	Sadjo (yellow card) 14'; Bojtor 81'

Stadion PSE, Paks
Attendance: 1,700
Referee: Tamás Bognár
- Paksi SE: Csernyánszki – Fiola, Éger, Sifter, Csehi – Bartha (Böde 60.), Sipeki, Heffler, Vayer – Kiss (Nagy 77.), Montvai. Coach: Károly Kis.
- Budapest Honvéd FC: Kemenes – Sós, Botis, Debreceni, Hajdú – Abass, Coira, Akassou, Sadjo (Bojtor 77.) – Rouani (Danilo 69.), Rufino (Horváth 86.). Coach: Massimo Morales.
- G.: Bojtor (81.)
- Y.: Sadjo (14.)

17 October 2010
17:30 CEST

Videoton FC Fehérvár	2 – 1 (2–0)	Paksi SE
Gosztonyi 11'; Alves 43' (pen.); Lipták (yellow card) 85'	(Report)	Csernyánszki (yellow card) 43'; Éger 86' (pen.)

Stadion Sóstói, Székesfehérvár
Attendance: 3,500
Referee: Sándor Andó-Szabó
- Videoton FC Fehérvár: Bozovic – Lázár, Lipták, Vaskó, Andic – Gosztonyi (Szakály 69.), Farkas, Sándor, Polonkai (Vasiljevic 80.) – Lencse (Mutumba 69.), Alves. Coach: György Mezey.
- Paksi SE: Csernyánszki – Fiola, Éger, Sifter, Csehi – Bartha (Báló 81.), Böde, Heffler, Vayer – Kiss (Magasföldi 76.), Montvai (Vári 81.). Coach: Károly Kis.
- G.: Gosztonyi (11.), Alves (43. – pen.) – Éger (86. – pen.)
- Y.: Lipták (85.) – Csernyánszki (43.)

22 October 2010
17:00 CEST

Paksi SE	2 – 1 (0–0)	Győri ETO FC
Vayer 75'; Böde 79'	(Report)	Völgyi (yellow card) 35'; Bouguerra 62'; Szabó (yellow card) 74'; Stanišić (yellow card) 77'; Pilibaitis (yellow card) 77'; Eugene (yellow card) 90+1'

Stadion PSE, Paks
Attendance: 1,400
Referee: Tamás Bognár
- Paksi SE: Csernyánszki – Heffler, Éger, Fiola (Lisztes 93.), Csehi – Magasföldi (Báló 65.), Böde, Sifter, Vayer – Bartha, Montvai (Kiss 62.). Coach: Károly Kis.
- Győri ETO FC: Sánta – Fehér, Stanisic, Eugene, Völgyi – Dinjar (Aleksidze 51.), Copa (Szabó 68.), Pilibaitis, Trajkovic – Bouguerra, Koltai (Ceolin 46.). Coach: Attila Pintér.
- G.: Vayer (75.), Böde (79.) – Bouguerra (62.)
- Y.: Völgyi (35.), Szabó (74.), Stanisic (77.), Pilibaitis (77.), Eugene (91.)

31 October 2010
17:30 CEST

Újpest FC	2 – 3 (1–2)	Paksi SE
Tisza 44'; Böőr 50'; Mitrović (yellow card) 68'	(Report)	Éger 16'; Csehi (yellow card) 27'; Böde 32'; Bartha 60'; Kiss (yellow card) 70'

Szusza Ferenc Stadium, Budapest
Attendance: 4,000
Referee: Alvaro Miquel Garcia
- Újpest FC: Balajcza – Szokol, Kiss, Vermes, Pollák – Simek (Barczi 72.), Egerszegi, Matos (Rajczi 46.), Mitrovic, Simon (Böőr 46.) – Tisza. Coach: Géza Mészöly.
- Paksi SE: Csernyánszki – Heffler, Éger, Szabó, Csehi – Bartha, Sifter, Böde, Sipeki (Kiss 52.), Vayer (Báló 90.) – Montvai (Magasföldi 75.). Coach: Károly Kis.
- G.: Tisza (44.), Böőr (50.) – Éger (16.), Böde (32.), Bartha (60.)
- Y.: Mitrovic (68.) – Csehi (27.), Kiss (70.)

6 November 2010
16:00 CEST

Paksi SE	0 – 0 (0–0)	BFC Siófok
Kiss (yellow card) 53'	(Report)	Mogyorósi (yellow card) 81'

Stadion PSE, Paks
Attendance: 1,500
Referee: Mihály Fábián
- Paksi SE: Csernyánszki – Heffler, Éger, Szabó, Csehi – Bartha (Lisztes 28.), Böde, Sifter, Sipeki (Kiss 46.) – Montvai, Vayer (Magasföldi 46.). Coach: Károly Kis.
- BFC Siófok: Molnár – Mogyorósi, Fehér, Graszl, Novák – Homma (Délczeg 79.), Tusori, Kecskés, Lukács (Piller 78.) – Sowunmi, Ivancsics. Coach: István Mihalecz.
- G.: —
- Y.: Kiss (53.) – Mogyorósi (81.)

13 November 2010
16:00 CEST

Vasas SC	2 – 3 (2–1)	Paksi SE
Ferenczi 13'; Polényi (yellow card) 25'; Németh 36'; Bakos (yellow card) 47'; Balog (yellow card) 68'	(Report)	Kiss 21'; Sifter (yellow card) 28'; Heffler 50'; Böde 62'; Bartha (yellow card) 89'

Stadion Rudolf Illovszky, Budapest
Attendance: 1,500
Referee: Tamás Bognár
- Vasas SC: Végh – Balog, Arnaut, Gáspár, Polényi (Mileusnic 46.) – Arsic, Bakos (Pavicevic 72.), Mundi (Beliczky 64.), Németh – Lázok, Ferenczi. Coach: András Komjáti.
- Paksi SE: Csernyánszki – Heffler, Fiola (Vári 87.), Szabó, Csehi – Báló (Vayer 64.), Böde, Sifter, Sipeki (Magasföldi 59.) – Bartha, Kiss. Coach: Károly Kis.
- G.: Ferenczi (13.), Németh (36.) – Kiss (21.), Heffler (50.), Böde (62.)
- Y.: Polényi (25.), Bakos (47.), Balog (68.) – Sifter (28.), Bartha (89.)

20 November 2010
16:00 CEST

Paksi SE	1 – 1 (0–0)	MTK Budapest FC
Böde 81'	(Report)	Vukmir (yellow card) 66'; Könyves 73'; Kanta (yellow card) 91'

Stadion PSE, Paks
Attendance: 1,300
Referee: Ádám Farkas
- Paksi SE: Csernyánszki – Heffler, Fiola, Éger, Csehi – Böde, Sifter, Sipeki, Vayer – Bartha (Magasföldi 61.), Kiss (Montvai 56.). Coach: Károly Kis.
- MTK Budapest FC: Szatmári – Szekeres, Sütő, Vadnai – Vukadinovic, Vukmir, Szabó (Eppel 68.), Ladányi (Nikházi 92.), Kanta – Tischler (A. Pál 46.), Könyves. Coach: József Garami.
- G.: Böde (81.) – Könyves (73.)
- Y.: Vukmir (66.), Kanta (91.)

== Hungarian Cup ==
=== Third round ===
22 September 2010
15:30 CEST

Balatonlelle SE	0 – 4 (0–2)	Paksi SE
Valla (yellow card) 58'	(Report)	Gévay 22' 83'; Szabó (yellow card) 38'; Dudás 45'; Nagy 47' (pen.)

Városi Stadion, Balatonlelle
Attendance: 200
Referee: Szabolcs Fenyvesi
- Balatonelle SE: Szabó – Kenéz, Sylla (Bőrczy 54.), Kovács, Gelencsér – Makarész, Bodrogi (Ágoston 29.), Petronovics (Zsiga 52.), Valla – Galgóczi, Graszl. Coach: Ferenc Keszei.
- Paksi SE: Kovács – Mészáros, Szabó, Gévay, Báló – Dudás (Bohner 63.), Böde (Fiola 63.), Nagy, Haraszti – Magasföldi (Lisztes 54.), Vári. Coach: Károly Kis.
- G.: Gévay (22., 83.), Dudás (45.), Nagy (47. – pen.)
- Y.: Valla (58.) – Szabó (38.)

=== Fourth round ===
27 October 2010
17:00 CEST

Pécsi Mecsek FC	0 – 1 (0–0)	Paksi SE
Stark (yellow card) 67'; Horváth (yellow card) 73'	(Report)	Éger 63'

Stadion PMFC, Pécs
Attendance: 1,200
Referee: Ferenc Bede
- Pécsi Mecsek FC: Dibusz – J. Nagy, Stark, Todorovic, Törtei – Regedei, Pintér – O. Nagy (Stojanovski 68.), Bozsik (Horváth 61.), Lovrencsics (Kvekveskiri 80.) – Gyánó. Coach: László Kiss.
- Paksi SE: Kovács – Heffler, Éger, Szabó, Sifter – Báló (Vayer 58.), Csehi, Kiss (Sipeki 86.), Magasföldi – Bartha (Lisztes 46.), Montvai. Coach: Károly Kis.
- G.: Éger (63.)
- Y.: Stark (67.), Horváth (73.)

== Hungarian League Cup ==
=== Group stage ===
Pos	Team	Pld	W	D	L	GF	GA	GD	Pts	Qualification
1	Paks	4	3	0	1	12	5	+7	9	Advance to knockout phase
2	Vasas	4	2	0	2	7	8	−1	6	
3	MTK	4	1	0	3	6	12	−6	3	

24 July 2010
17:00 CEST

MTK Budapest FC	4 – 2 (4–1)	Paksi SE
Sz. Pál 6' 14'; Molnár 31' 39'; L. Szabó (yellow card) 34'; Gál (yellow card) 83'	(Report)	Bartha 41'; Fiola (yellow card) 54'; Lisztes 63'

Stadion Hidegkuti Nándor, Budapest
Referee: Zoltán J. Kovács
- MTK Budapest FC: Horváth – Hajdú, Kálnoki-Kis, Forró, Gál – Kelemen, Kákonyi, Macura (Kornis 70.), Molnár (Csiki 70.) – Sz. Pál, L. Szabó (Ódé 70.). Coach: Gábor Pölöskei.
- Paksi SE: Kovács – Miskolczi (Mészáros 57.), Éger (Fiola 36.), Szabó, Csehi (Vayer 38.) – Kiss (Bartha 38.), Heffler, Sifter, Báló – Böde (Lisztes 38.), Montvai. Coach: Károly Kis.
- G.: Sz. Pál (6., 14.), Molnár (31., 39.) – Bartha (41.), Lisztes (63.)
- Y.: L. Szabó (34.), Gál (83.) – Fiola (54.)

3 November 2010
13:00 CEST

Paksi SE	2 – 0 (1–0)	Vasas SC
Tóth 32'; Lisztes 60'	(Report)	Pavičević (yellow card) 81'

Stadion PSE, Paks
Referee: Szabolcs Fenyvesi
- Paksi SE: Kovács – Gévay, Tóth, Báló (Berkó 72.), Mészáros – Lisztes, Haraszti (Pintér 65.), Dudás, Vári – Magasföldi, Bohner (Pap 81.). Coach: Károly Kis.
- Vasas SC: Tulipán – Kovács, Görgényi, Pavicevic, Dobric (Loussaief 46.) – Mundi (Fürjes 75.), Katona, Arsic (Beliczky 57.), Ferenczi (Hristov 72.) – Hrepka, Polényi. Coach: András Komjáti.
- G.: Tóth (32.), Lisztes (60.)
- Y.: Pavicevic (81.)

23 November 2010
13:00 CEST

Vasas SC	1 – 4 (1–1)	Paksi SE
Pantskhava 39'; Kovács (yellow card) 52'	(Report)	Gévay (yellow card) 33'; Bohner 35'; Nagy 47'; Vári 52'; Lisztes 67'; Szabó (yellow card) 90'

Stadion Rudolf Illovszky, Budapest
Referee: Ádám Radványi
- Vasas SC: Tulipán – Kovács, Görgényi, Loussaief, Bakos – Mundi, Katona, Beliczky, Pantkhava (Csoór 75.) – Polényi, Hristov (Balogh 55.). Coach: András Komjáti.
- Paksi SE: Kovács – Szabó, Gévay, Báló, Mészáros – Lisztes, Nagy (Cziráki 81.), Haraszti, Vári (Pap 76.) – Magasföldi, Bohner. Coach: Károly Kis.
- G.: Phantkhava (39.) – Bohner (35.), Nagy (47.), Vári (52.), Lisztes (67.)
- Y.: Kovács (52.) – Gévay (33.), Szabó (90.)
