= 2007–08 Paksi FC season =

Paks
2007–08 season
- Manager: Ferenc Lengyel (until 22 September); Imre Gellei (from 25 September)
- Stadium: Fehérvári úti Stadion (Home stadium); Stadion PMFC (Note: The match against Zalaegerszeg was played at the Stadion PMFC in Pécs, instead of Paks regular stadium, the Fehérvári úti Stadion in Paks, which did not meet HFF requirements.); Révész Géza utcai Stadion (Note: The match against Kaposvár was played at the Révész Géza utcai Stadion in Siófok, instead of Paks regular stadium, the Fehérvári úti Stadion in Paks, which did not meet HFF requirements.) (Temporary stadiums)
- Nemzeti Bajnokság I: 11th
- Magyar Kupa: Third round
- Ligakupa: Autumn season: Group stage Spring season: Quarter-finals
- Top goalscorer: League: Attila Tököli (15); All: Attila Tököli (16)
- Highest home attendance: 5,000 v Újpest (12 May 2008, Nemzeti Bajnokság I)
- Lowest home attendance: 50 v Fehérvár (30 November 2007, Ligakupa)
- Average home league attendance: 1,914
- Biggest win: 6–0 v Tatabánya (Home, 5 April 2008, Nemzeti Bajnokság I)
- Biggest defeat: 1–4 v MTK (Home, 28 July 2007, Nemzeti Bajnokság I); 0–3 v Honvéd (Home, 11 August 2007, Nemzeti Bajnokság I); 1–4 v Újpest (Away, 9 September 2007, Ligakupa); 0–3 v Zalaegerszeg (Home, 23 February 2008, Nemzeti Bajnokság I); 0–3 v Fehérvár (Away, 26 April 2008, Nemzeti Bajnokság I)

The 2007–08 season was Paksi Football Club's 2nd competitive season, 2nd consecutive season in the Nemzeti Bajnokság I and 57th season in existence as a football club. In addition to the domestic league, Paks participated in that season's editions of the Magyar Kupa and the Ligakupa.

== Squad ==
Squad at end of season

Note: Flags indicate national team as defined under FIFA eligibility rules; some limited exceptions apply. Players may hold more than one non-FIFA nationality.

No.	Pos.	Nation	Player
1	GK	HUN	Attila Kovács
2	DF	HUN	Zoltán Molnár
3	DF	HUN	Miklós Salamon
5	MF	HUN	Ádám Fritz
6	MF	HUN	János Zováth
7	MF	HUN	Tamás Báló
8	FW	HUN	Tibor Márkus
9	DF	HUN	Tamás Csehi
10	MF	HUN	Tamás Kiss
13	MF	HUN	Dániel Böde
14	DF	HUN	Viktor Hanák
16	MF	HUN	Tibor Heffler
18	MF	HUN	Iván Balaskó

No.	Pos.	Nation	Player
19	MF	HUN	István Mészáros
20	MF	HUN	Attila Buzás
21	FW	HUN	Attila Tököli
24	FW	HUN	Ádám Weitner
26	MF	HUN	Gábor Tamási
27	MF	HUN	Attila Kriston
28	GK	HUN	Péter Pokorni
49	DF	HUN	Sándor Horváth
73	DF	HUN	László Éger
80	MF	HUN	János Szabó
83	FW	ROU	Miklós Belényesi
87	FW	HUN	Barnabás Vári
89	FW	HUN	Roland Pap

== Transfers ==
=== Transfers in ===
Transfer window	Pos.	No.	Player	From
Summer	MF	–	(Hungary) Róbert Hortobágyi	Budakalász
Summer	N/A	–	(Hungary) Szilveszter Keszthelyi	Rákosmenti TK
Summer	MF	–	(Hungary) Viktor Szakács	ESMTK
Summer	FW	8	(Hungary) Tibor Márkus	(Cyprus) Apollon Limassol
Summer	MF	15	(Hungary) Péter Szili	Tamási
Summer	FW	21	(Hungary) Attila Tököli	Ferencváros
Summer	DF	73	(Hungary) László Éger	(Spain) Poli Ejido
Winter	N/A	–	(Hungary) Szabolcs Juhász	Honvéd
Winter	FW	24	(Hungary) Ádám Weitner	Felcsút
Winter	MF	27	(Hungary) Attila Kriston	Tatabánya
Winter	FW	89	(Hungary) Roland Pap	Bonyhád

=== Transfers out ===
Transfer window	Pos.	No.	Player	To
Summer	FW	–	(Hungary) László Balogh	Siófok
Summer	N/A	–	(Hungary) Roland Csiki	Decs
Summer	N/A	–	(Hungary) Krisztián Farkas	Bölcske
Summer	DF	–	(Hungary) Gergely Fenyősi	Bölcske
Summer	MF	–	(Hungary) Zsolt Lógó	Baja
Summer	N/A	–	(Hungary) Tamás Meleg	Balatonlelle
Summer	MF	–	(Hungary) Gergő Pákai	Bölcske
Summer	N/A	–	(Hungary) Norbert Schulteisz	Bölcske
Summer	N/A	–	(Hungary) Krisztián Sipos	Bölcske
Summer	N/A	–	(Hungary) Gábor Szekeres	Siófok
Summer	DF	–	(Hungary) Péter Tóth	Pécs
Summer	DF	–	(Hungary) Zsolt Vizdár	Bonyhád
Autumn	FW	99	(Hungary) Ferenc Horváth	(United Arab Emirates) Baniyas
Winter	MF	–	(Hungary) Róbert Hortobágyi	Budakalász
Winter	DF	–	(Hungary) Dániel Izsák	Veszprémi FC USE
Winter	MF	–	(Hungary) László Jenei	Baja
Winter	DF	4	(Hungary) Ferenc Benedeczki	Retired
Winter	DF	5	(Hungary) Attila Fehér	Szekszárd

=== Loans in ===
Transfer window	Pos.	No.	Player	From	End date

=== Loans out ===
Transfer window	Pos.	No.	Player	To	End date
Winter	MF	–	(Hungary) Péter Szili	Soroksár	End of season
Winter	DF	24	(Hungary) Tamás Kőkuti	Soroksár	End of season

== Competitions ==
=== Overview ===
Competition	First match	Last match	Starting round	Final position	Record							
Competition	First match	Last match	Starting round	Final position	Pld	W	D	L	GF	GA	GD	Win %
Nemzeti Bajnokság I	20 July 2007	1 June 2008	Matchday 1	11th	30	9	10	11	51	51	+0	30.00
Magyar Kupa	28 August 2007	28 August 2007	Third round	Third round	1	0	1	0	0	0	+0	0.00
Ligakupa (Autumn season)	8 August 2007	9 October 2007	Group stage	Group stage	6	2	0	4	11	14	−3	33.33
Ligakupa (Spring season)	30 November 2007	12 March 2008	Group stage	Quarter-finals	8	5	1	2	18	13	+5	62.50
Total					45	16	12	17	80	78	+2	35.56

Source: Competitions

=== Nemzeti Bajnokság I ===
==== League table ====
Pos	Team	Pld	W	D	L	GF	GA	GD	Pts
9	Vasas	30	12	5	13	41	45	−4	41
10	Nyíregyháza	30	11	7	12	34	37	−3	40
11	Paks	30	9	10	11	51	51	0	37
12	Rákospalota	30	7	9	14	42	60	−18	30
13	Diósgyőr	30	5	13	12	43	63	−20	28

Source: soccerway.com

==== Results summary ====
Overall								Home						Away					
Pld	W	D	L	GF	GA	GD	Pts	W	D	L	GF	GA	GD	W	D	L	GF	GA	GD
30	9	10	11	51	51	0	37	7	4	4	28	20	+8	2	6	7	23	31	−8

Source: Hungarian Football Federation

==== Results by round ====
Round	1	2	3	4	5	6	7	8	9	10	11	12	13	14	15	16	17	18	19	20	21	22	23	24	25	26	27	28	29	30
Ground	A	H	A	H	A	H	A	H	A	H	A	A	H	A	H	H	A	H	A	H	A	H	A	H	A	H	H	A	H	A
Result	L	L	L	L	L	W	W	L	D	W	D	L	D	D	D	L	D	D	L	W	W	W	L	W	L	W	W	D	D	D
Position	13	15	14	15	15	13	11	12	12	12	12	13	13	13	12	13	13	13	13	12	11	11	11	11	11	11	11	11	11	11
Points	0	0	0	0	0	3	6	6	7	10	11	11	12	13	14	14	15	16	16	19	22	25	25	28	28	31	34	35	36	37

Source: Matches
A = Away; H = Home; W = Win; D = Draw; L = Loss

==== Matches ====
20 July 2007 1	Zalaegerszeg	3–1	Paks	Zalaegerszeg
19:00 CEST (UTC+2)	Z. Tóth 45'; Waltner 60', 90+3' (pen.); Vulin (yellow card) 86'	Report	Márkus 6'; Zováth (yellow card) 20'; T. Kiss I (yellow card) 41'; Tököli (yellow card) 84'; Balaskó (red card) 88'	Stadium: ZTE Arena; Attendance: 4,500; Referee: Tamás Arany; Assistant referees: Dr. Péter Szabó, László Viszokai; Fourth official: Krisztián Király

28 July 2007 2	Paks	1–4	MTK	Paks
18:00 CEST (UTC+2)	Márkus 2', (yellow card) 3'; Éger (yellow card) 24'	Report	Pátkai 9', (yellow card) 62'; Kanta 75'; Zsidai 82'; Hrepka 90+2'	Stadium: Fehérvári úti Stadion; Attendance: 3,500; Referee: Csaba Imre Sápi; Assistant referees: Tibor Vígh, Attila Forgács; Fourth official: János Guta

4 August 2007 3	Kaposvár	2–1	Paks	Kaposvár
19:00 CEST (UTC+2)	Alves 9'; Zahorecz 88'; Suljić (yellow card) 90+2'	Report	Hanák (yellow card) 23'; Márkus 64'; Zováth (yellow card) 87'; Éger (yellow card) 88'	Stadium: Rákóczi Stadion; Attendance: 3,500; Referee: József Berger; Assistant referees: Szabolcs Deutsch, Balázs Huszár; Fourth official: Csaba Pintér

11 August 2007 4	Paks	0–3	Honvéd	Paks
17:00 CEST (UTC+2)	Tököli (red card) 37'; Heffler (yellow card) 56'; Báló (yellow card) 60'; Éger (yellow card) 60'	Report	Hercegfalvi 14'; Mogyorósi (yellow card) 29'; Guié 35', 48'; Magasföldi (yellow card) 87'	Stadium: Fehérvári úti Stadion; Attendance: 3,000; Referee: Zsolt Szabó; Assistant referees: Róbert Kispál, Dr. Péter Hegyi; Fourth official: Norbert Ferencz

20 August 2007 5	Vasas	3–2	Paks	Budapest
18:00 CEST (UTC+2)	N. Németh 70'; A. Tóth (red card) 75'; Lázok 83'; Tandari 88'	Report	S. Horváth (yellow card) 18'; Heffler 40', (yellow card) 85'; Molnár (yellow card) 51'; F. Horváth 65'; Böde (yellow card) 70'; Márkus (yellow card) 78'	Stadium: Illovszky Rudolf Stadion; Attendance: 1,500; Referee: Zoltán Iványi; Assistant referees: Zsolt Szpisják, János Medovarszki; Fourth official: Attila Hegedűs

25 August 2007 6	Paks	3–0	Nyíregyháza	Paks
17:30 CEST (UTC+2)	Molnár (yellow card) 28'; Hanák 47'; F. Horváth 71'; Márkus 90'	Report	Zabos (yellow card) 19'; Menougong (red card) 52'; Bagoly (yellow card) 64'; Ambrusz (red card) 77'	Stadium: Fehérvári úti Stadion; Attendance: 1,500; Referee: Péter Solymosi; Assistant referees: Balázs Farkas, István Iványi; Fourth official: Csaba Ursprung

1 September 2007 7	Tatabánya	2–4	Paks	Tatabánya
16:30 CEST (UTC+2)	Filó 17', (yellow card) 74'; Kozák (yellow card) 60'; B. Balogh (yellow card) 69'; Hajdú 82'	Report	Heffler (yellow card) 25', (goal) 36', 69'; Buzás (yellow card) 45'; Molnár 56'; Tamási (yellow card) 58'; F. Horváth 74'	Stadium: Városi Stadion; Attendance: 1,200; Referee: Tamás Bognár; Assistant referees: Dr. Péter Szabó, Tamás Raff; Fourth official: Krisztián Pánczél

15 September 2007 8	Paks	0–2	Rákospalota	Paks
16:30 CEST (UTC+2)	Salamon (yellow card) 29'	Report	Torma 30'; Nyerges 36'; G. Horváth I (yellow card) 56'; Erős (yellow card) 61'	Stadium: Fehérvári úti Stadion; Attendance: 800; Referee: Zoltán Iványi; Assistant referees: Zsolt Szpisják, István Albert; Fourth official: Zsolt Kovács

22 September 2007 9	Sopron	1–1	Paks	Sopron
18:00 CEST (UTC+2)	Károlyi (yellow card) 26'; Belić (yellow card) 44'; Csontos (yellow card) 59'; Zana 83'; Z. Pintér (yellow card) 84'	Report	A. Kovács (yellow card) 44'; Tamási (yellow card) 65'; Éger 75'; Báló (yellow card) 78'; Hanák (yellow card) 90'	Stadium: Káposztás utcai Stadion; Attendance: 2,000; Referee: Szabolcs Szilasi; Assistant referees: László Viszokai, Szabolcs Deutsch; Fourth official: Krisztián Király

29 September 2007 10	Paks	2–1	Fehérvár	Paks
16:00 CEST (UTC+2)	Molnár (yellow card) 24'; S. Horváth (yellow card) 36'; Buzás 48' (pen.), (yellow card) 61'; Tököli 90+3'	Report	D. Nagy (yellow card) 26'; Dvéri (yellow card) 43'; Éger 45' (o.g.)	Stadium: Fehérvári úti Stadion; Attendance: 2,000; Referee: Tamás Bognár; Assistant referees: Balázs Farkas, Zoltán Tompos; Fourth official: János Csák

6 October 2007 11	Győr	3–3	Paks	Győr
15:00 CEST (UTC+2)	Nikolov 9'; Völgyi 62'; Bogdanović 67'; Stevanović (yellow card) 90'	Report	Tököli 52'; Balaskó (yellow card) 81', (goal) 88' (pen.); Márkus 90+2'	Stadium: ETO Park; Attendance: 4,000; Referee: Tamás Arany; Assistant referees: Zoltán Szalai, Ferenc Varga; Fourth official: Dániel Becséri

20 October 2007 12	Újpest	3–1	Paks	Budapest
18:00 CEST (UTC+2)	Dourandi 9'; Z. Kovács 29'; Vermes (yellow card) 36'; G. Sándor 55'	Report	Éger (yellow card) 56'; T. Kiss I 80'	Stadium: Szusza Ferenc Stadion; Attendance: 3,307; Referee: Zoltán Iványi; Assistant referees: István Albert, János Medovarszki; Fourth official: Tibor Gyarmati II

3 November 2007 13	Paks	2–2	Diósgyőr	Paks
13:30 CET (UTC+1)	Tamási (yellow card) 22'; Molnár (yellow card) 32'; Tököli 79'; T. Kiss I 90'	Report	Bessong (yellow card) 35'; A. Simon 42'; Sipeki 65'	Stadium: Fehérvári úti Stadion; Attendance: 1,000; Referee: Viktor Kassai; Assistant referees: Gábor Erős, Tibor Vámos; Fourth official: Tibor Farkas

10 November 2007 14	Debrecen	1–1	Paks	Debrecen
16:00 CET (UTC+1)	Kouemaha 54'; Leandro (yellow card) 90'	Report	Heffler (yellow card) 55'; Éger 74'; Hanák (yellow card) 76'; Báló (yellow card) 78'	Stadium: Oláh Gábor utcai Stadion; Attendance: 4,000; Referee: Mihály Fábián; Assistant referees: Dr. Zsolt Varga, Gyula Ortó; Fourth official: János Takács

24 November 2007 15	Paks	1–1	Siófok	Paks
13:00 CET (UTC+1)	Tököli 57', (yellow card) 87'; Molnár (yellow card) 90+2'	Report	S. Kanta 56'; Forgács (yellow card) 90+1'	Stadium: Fehérvári úti Stadion; Attendance: 1,000; Referee: Ferenc Bede; Assistant referees: Balázs Farkas, Zsolt Butkai; Fourth official: József Erdős

23 February 2008 16	Paks	0–3	Zalaegerszeg	Pécs
16:00 CET (UTC+1)	Éger (yellow card) 80'	Report	Méyé 11', 22'; Botiș (yellow card) 20'; Koplárovics (yellow card) 40'; Vulin (yellow card) 50'; Z. Tóth (yellow card) 73'; Balázs 75'	Stadium: Stadion PMFC; Attendance: 400; Referee: Zoltán Iványi; Assistant referees: János Medovarszki, Attila Forgács; Fourth official: Gyula Hegedűs

1 March 2008 17	MTK	1–1	Paks	Budapest
16:00 CET (UTC+1)	Á. Pintér (yellow card) 41'; Pátkai (yellow card) 62'; L. Horváth (yellow card) 77'; J. Kanta 78'	Report	Báló 28'; Kriston (yellow card) 40'; Weitner (red card) 90'	Stadium: Hidegkuti Nándor Stadion; Attendance: 500; Referee: Viktor Kassai; Assistant referees: Tibor Vámos, István Tóth; Fourth official: Gábor Oláh

8 March 2008 18	Paks	1–1	Kaposvár	Siófok
16:00 CET (UTC+1)	Tököli 72', (red card) 77'; Éger (red card) 76'; Zováth (yellow card) 84'	Report	Maróti (yellow card) 31'; Alves 80'	Stadium: Révész Géza utcai Stadion; Attendance: 600; Referee: István Vad; Assistant referees: Zsolt Márton, Balázs Farkas; Fourth official: Tibor Gyarmati II

15 March 2008 19	Honvéd	2–1	Paks	Budapest
16:00 CET (UTC+1)	Zsolnai 10'; Smiljanić (yellow card) 43'; Berdó (yellow card) 60'; Genito 78'	Report	Éger 22'; Márkus (yellow card) 44'; S. Horváth (yellow card) 72'	Stadium: Bozsik József Stadion; Attendance: 2,200; Referee: Sándor Andó-Szabó; Assistant referees: György Ring, Zoltán Szalai; Fourth official: Gergő Király

22 March 2008 20	Paks	3–0	Vasas	Paks
16:00 CET (UTC+1)	Böde 25'; Zováth 53'; Tököli 75'	Report	A. Tóth (red card) 65'; Füzi (red card) 85'	Stadium: Fehérvári úti Stadion; Attendance: 1,200; Referee: Tamás Arany; Assistant referees: László Viszokai, István Iványi; Fourth official: Csaba Ursprung

29 March 2008 21	Nyíregyháza	1–2	Paks	Nyíregyháza
16:00 CET (UTC+1)	N. Szilágyi 58'; Miskolczi (yellow card) 72'; Cornaci (yellow card) 75'	Report	Kriston (yellow card) 27'; Weitner 90+2'; Tököli 90+4'	Stadium: Városi Stadion; Attendance: 3,000; Referee: Csaba Imre Sápi; Assistant referees: Zsolt Szpisják, István Albert; Fourth official: János Guta

5 April 2008 22	Paks	6–0	Tatabánya	Paks
19:00 CEST (UTC+2)	T. Kiss I 12'; Éger 22'; Tököli 40', 61', 63'; Kriston 56'	Report	A. Németh (yellow card) 27'; V. Farkas (yellow card) 35'; Z. Balogh (red card) 43'; Vámosi (yellow card) 66'; Dienes (yellow card) 90'	Stadium: Fehérvári úti Stadion; Attendance: 1,300; Referee: József Berger; Assistant referees: Attila Forgács, Gábor Kormányos II; Fourth official: Gábor Fajkusz

12 April 2008 23	Rákospalota	2–1	Paks	Sopron (Note: The match was played at the Káposztás utcai Stadion in Sopron, instead of REAC regular stadium, the Budai II. László Stadion in Budapest, which did not meet HFF requirements.)
19:00 CEST (UTC+2)	Torma (yellow card) 4'; Z. Varga 14', (yellow card) 90'; Erős (yellow card) 39'; Sallai (yellow card) 43'; Somorjai 47'; G. Horváth I (yellow card) 76'	Report	T. Kiss I 37', (yellow card) 43'; Tököli (yellow card) 53'; Z. Molnár (yellow card) 69'	Stadium: Káposztás utcai Stadion; Attendance: 700; Referee: Zsolt Szabó; Assistant referees: Róbert Kispál, Arnold Kepe; Fourth official: Norbert Kiss

19 April 2008 24	Paks	3–0 (awd.)	Sopron	Paks
		Report		Stadium: Fehérvári úti Stadion
Note: After the exclusion of Sopron, the matches were registered with a goal difference of 3–0.

26 April 2008 25	Fehérvár	3–0	Paks	Székesfehérvár
19:00 CEST (UTC+2)	Dvéri 22'; G. Horváth II (yellow card) 44'; D. Nagy (yellow card) 66', (goal) 70'; Koller (yellow card) 82', (goal) 90'	Report	S. Horváth (yellow card) 35'; Éger (yellow card) 87'	Stadium: Sóstói Stadion; Attendance: 3,315; Referee: Roland Veizer; Assistant referees: Tamás Márkus, Zoltán Pápai; Fourth official: Ádám Farkas

3 May 2008 26	Paks	2–1	Győr	Paks
19:00 CEST (UTC+2)	Tököli 8', 17'; Böde (yellow card) 21'; Báló (yellow card) 82'	Report	Völgyi (yellow card) 26'; Šupić (yellow card) 60'; Tokody 85'	Stadium: Fehérvári úti Stadion; Attendance: 2,000; Referee: Ferenc Bede; Assistant referees: Tibor Vámos, István Iványi; Fourth official: Gergely Szőts

12 May 2008 27	Paks	2–0	Újpest	Paks
18:00 CEST (UTC+2)	Kriston (yellow card) 24'; Tököli 44'; Heffler 60'; Zováth (yellow card) 70'	Report		Stadium: Fehérvári úti Stadion; Attendance: 5,000; Referee: István Mészáros; Assistant referees: Vencel Tóth II, László Viszokai; Fourth official: Tibor Gyarmati II

17 May 2008 28	Diósgyőr	3–3	Paks	Miskolc
19:00 CEST (UTC+2)	Szélpál (yellow card) 39'; A. Simon 49', 58', 82'; Sebők (yellow card) 51'	Report	S. Horváth (yellow card) 15'; Böde 31', (yellow card) 76'; Tököli 40' (pen.), 69'; Báló (yellow card) 80'	Stadium: Diósgyőri Stadion; Attendance: 6,500; Referee: Ádám Németh; Assistant referees: Attila Kelemen, Gyula Fehér; Fourth official: István Kelemen

23 May 2008 29	Paks	2–2	Debrecen	Paks
19:00 CEST (UTC+2)	Báló 36', (yellow card) 36'; Belényesi 69'; Tamási (yellow card) 89'	Report	Kouemaha (yellow card) 40'; Leandro 49'; Huszák (yellow card) 55'; Komlósi (yellow card) 63'; Bogdanović 73'	Stadium: Fehérvári úti Stadion; Attendance: 3,500; Referee: Péter Solymosi; Assistant referees: Gábor Takács, Oszkár Lémon; Fourth official: J. Zoltán Kovács

1 June 2008 30	Siófok	1–1	Paks	Siófok
19:00 CEST (UTC+2)	Melczer 36'; Miklósvári (yellow card) 57'	Report	Tamási 30'; Hanák (yellow card) 75'; Böde (yellow card) 90'	Stadium: Révész Géza utcai Stadion; Attendance: 500; Referee: Mihály Fábián; Assistant referees: Dr. Zsolt Varga, Zoltán Pápai; Fourth official: Róbert Nagy

=== Magyar Kupa ===
28 August 2007 Third round	Ferencváros	0–0	Paks	Budapest
18:00 CEST (UTC+2)	Lipcsei (yellow card) 30'; Rédei (yellow card) 58'	Report	Tamási (yellow card) 62'	Stadium: Üllői úti Stadion; Attendance: 2,000; Referee: Ferenc Bede; Assistant referees: Tibor Vámos, Zoltán Szalai; Fourth official: Gábor Oláh
Note: Ferencváros advanced as a lower division team.

=== Ligakupa ===
==== Autumn season ====
===== Group stage =====
Pos	Team	Pld	W	D	L	GF	GA	GD	Pts	Qualification	FEH	UJP	HON	PAK
1	Fehérvár	6	3	1	2	15	9	+6	10	Advance to knockout phase	—	3–0	2–2	3–1
2	Újpest	6	3	1	2	15	14	+1	10	Advance to knockout phase	4–3	—	4–5	4–1
3	Honvéd	6	2	2	2	12	16	−4	8		0–3	1–1	—	4–2
4	Paks	6	2	0	4	11	14	−3	6		2–1	1–2	4–0	—

Source: HFF

8 August 2007 1	Honvéd	4–2	Paks	Budapest
19:30 CEST (UTC+2)	Debreceni 24', (yellow card) 47'; Palásthy 29'; Magasföldi 71'; Bárányos 79'; Vincze (yellow card) 81'	Report	Báló 27'; Tamási (yellow card) 44'; Brukner 73'	Stadium: Bozsik József Stadion; Attendance: 700; Referee: Szabolcs Szilasi; Assistant referees: Oszkár Lémon, Gábor Takács

22 August 2007 2	Paks	2–1	Fehérvár	Paks
16:00 CEST (UTC+2)	S. Horváth (yellow card) 35', (goal) 49'; Fehér 47' (o.g.); Kőkuti (yellow card) 90'	Report	Vadász (yellow card) 55'; Fehér 80'	Stadium: Fehérvári úti Stadion; Attendance: 300; Referee: Sándor Andó-Szabó; Assistant referees: Vencel Tóth II, Zoltán Szalai

9 September 2007 3	Újpest	4–1	Paks	Budapest
19:00 CEST (UTC+2)	Salamon 23' (o.g.); G. Sándor 30', (yellow card) 51'; Dourandi 62'; Vermes (yellow card) 69'; Tisza 81'	Report	Tököli 27'; Buzás (red card) 43'; S. Horváth (yellow card) 66'	Stadium: Szusza Ferenc Stadion; Attendance: 1,362; Referee: Gergely Sulyok; Assistant referees: Tibor Vígh, János Agócs

19 September 2007 4	Paks	1–2	Újpest	Paks
16:00 CEST (UTC+2)	Balaskó (yellow card) 32'; Tamási 44'; Vári (yellow card) 51'; Molnár (yellow card) 90+1'	Report	Korcsmár (yellow card) 17'; Lee 40'; Böjte (red card) 59'; Dourandi 67'; Kéthévoama (yellow card) 90+1'	Stadium: Fehérvári úti Stadion; Attendance: 300; Referee: József Erdős; Assistant referees: Vencel Tóth II, György Ring

3 October 2007 5	Paks	4–0	Honvéd	Paks
15:00 CEST (UTC+2)	Márkus 9', 20', 56'; Báló 41'	Report	Vincze (yellow card) 21'; Koós (yellow card) 25'; Mogyorósi (yellow card) 80'	Stadium: Fehérvári úti Stadion; Attendance: 300; Referee: Norbert Kiss; Assistant referees: Dr. Péter Szabó, Arnold Kepe

9 October 2007 6	Fehérvár	3–1	Paks	Székesfehérvár
17:00 CEST (UTC+2)	Kocsis 6'; G. Horváth II (yellow card) 12'; Simek (yellow card) 18'; Koller (yellow card) 61'; B. Farkas 65'; Csobánki (yellow card) 72'; Sitku 83'	Report	Balaskó 21'	Stadium: Sóstói Stadion; Attendance: 243; Referee: Ferenc Bede; Assistant referees: Imre Attila Nagy, Tamás Raff

==== Spring season ====
===== Group stage =====
Pos	Team	Pld	W	D	L	GF	GA	GD	Pts	Qualification	PAK	SIO	KAP	FEH
1	Paks	6	5	0	1	16	10	+6	15	Advance to knockout phase	—	3–0	2–1	3–1
2	Siófok	6	3	0	3	15	13	+2	9	Advance to knockout phase	4–2	—	1–2	4–2
3	Kaposvár	6	3	0	3	11	11	0	9		4–5	2–1	—	2–0
4	Fehérvár	6	1	0	5	7	15	−8	3		0–1	2–5	2–0	—

Source: HFF

30 November 2007 1	Paks	3–1	Fehérvár	Székesfehérvár
11:00 CET (UTC+1)	Balaskó 21'; T. Kiss I 49'; Vári 50'; Molnár (red card) 89'	Report	Disztl 75'	Stadium: Sóstói Stadion; Attendance: 50; Referee: Ádám Németh; Assistant referees: Zoltán Tompos, György Ring

5 December 2007 2	Kaposvár	4–5	Paks	Kaposvár
13:00 CET (UTC+1)	Grúz 43'; Alves 47'; A. Pintér (yellow card) 51'; Božović 55', 90+2'; Suljić (yellow card) 90'	Report	Éger 7'; Tamási (yellow card) 15'; Balaskó (yellow card) 32'; Salamon 41'; Böde 62', (yellow card) 76'; T. Kiss I 69'; Vári (yellow card) 77', (goal) 90'	Stadium: Rákóczi Stadion; Attendance: 200; Referee: Krisztián Király; Assistant referees: Dr. Péter Szabó, Balázs Huszár

8 December 2007 3	Siófok	4–2	Paks	Székesfehérvár
11:00 CET (UTC+1)	Fülöp 24'; Kozmor 67'; Molnár 79' (o.g.); Csopaki 85'	Report	Heffler 14', (yellow card) 52'; Báló (yellow card) 22'; Molnár (yellow card) 23'; T. Kiss 28'; Böde (yellow card) 59'; Szabó (yellow card) 65'	Stadium: Sóstói Stadion; Attendance: 50; Referee: Zoltán Iványi; Assistant referees: Zsolt Szpisják, János Medovarszki

16 February 2008 4	Paks	3–0	Siófok	Paks
14:00 CET (UTC+1)	T. Kiss I 13'; Balaskó 36'; Belényesi 90'	Report		Stadium: ASE Sporttelep; Attendance: 500; Referee: István Vad; Assistant referees: Balázs Farkas, István Iványi

20 February 2008 5	Fehérvár	0–1	Paks	Székesfehérvár
14:00 CET (UTC+1)		Report	Hanák (yellow card) 13'; Weitner 37', (yellow card) 82'; Kriston (yellow card) 64'	Stadium: Sóstói Stadion; Attendance: 100; Referee: József Erdős; Assistant referees: Zsolt Butkai, Ferenc Varga

27 February 2008 6	Paks	2–1	Kaposvár	Paks
14:00 CET (UTC+1)	Báló 25', 27'; Weitner (yellow card) 59'; Pokorni (yellow card) 60'	Report	Márton (yellow card) 28'; Petrók (yellow card) 45'; Božović 61' (pen.); Szolomájer (yellow card) 83'	Stadium: Fehérvári úti Stadion; Attendance: 150; Referee: Krisztián Király; Assistant referees: Zoltán Kovács, Szabolcs Deutsch

===== Knockout phase =====
====== Quarter-finals ======
5 March 2008 First leg	Győr	1–1	Paks	Győr
14:30 CET (UTC+1)	Pákolicz 39'	Report	Böde (yellow card) 57'; Tamási (yellow card) 64', (goal) 88'	Stadium: ETO Park; Attendance: 200; Referee: Tamás Bognár; Assistant referees: Dr. Péter Szabó, Gábor Takács

12 March 2008 Second leg	Paks	1–2 (2–3 agg.)	Győr	Paks
13:30 CET (UTC+1)	Balaskó 88'	Report	Lappints 72'; Sánta 81'	Stadium: Fehérvári úti Stadion; Attendance: 400; Referee: Péter Solymosi; Assistant referees: Oszkár Lémon, László Viszokai
Note: Győr won 3–2 on aggregate.

== Statistics ==
=== Overall ===
Appearances (Apps) numbers are for appearances in competitive games only, including sub appearances.
Source: Competitions

No.	Player	Pos.	Nemzeti Bajnokság I				Magyar Kupa				Ligakupa				Total			
No.	Player	Pos.	Apps	Goal	Yellow card	Red card	Apps	Goal	Yellow card	Red card	Apps	Goal	Yellow card	Red card	Apps	Goal	Yellow card	Red card
1	(Hungary) Attila Kovács	GK	29		1		1				9				39		1	
2	(Hungary) Zoltán Molnár	DF	18	1	6		1				6		2	1	25	1	8	1
3	(Hungary) Miklós Salamon	DF	27		1		1				11	1			39	1	1	
5	(Hungary) István Baranyi	N/A									2				2			
6	(Hungary) János Zováth	MF	22	1	4						7				29	1	4	
7	(Hungary) Tamás Báló	MF	20	2	6		1				10	4	1		31	6	7	
7	(Hungary) Viktor Szakács	MF									2				2			
8	(Hungary) Tibor Márkus	FW	21	5	3		1				7	3			29	8	3	
9	(Hungary) Tamás Csehi	DF	17								9				26			
10	(Hungary) Tamás Kiss	MF	27	4	2		1				9	4			37	8	2	
13	(Hungary) Dániel Böde	MF	20	2	4		1				9	1	3		30	3	7	
14	(Hungary) Viktor Hanák	DF	23	1	4		1				7		1		31	1	5	
15	(Hungary) Péter Szili	MF									2				2			
16	(Hungary) Tibor Heffler	MF	23	4	4		1				13	1	1		37	5	5	
18	(Hungary) Iván Balaskó	MF	14	1	1	1					10	4	2		24	5	3	1
19	(Hungary) István Mészáros	MF	1								3				4			
20	(Hungary) Attila Buzás	MF	13	1	2		1				6			1	20	1	2	1
21	(Hungary) Attila Tököli	FW	22	15	3	2					6	1			28	16	3	2
24	(Hungary) Tamás Kőkuti	DF									3		1		3		1	
24	(Hungary) Ádám Weitner	FW	8	1		1					5	1	2		13	2	2	1
26	(Hungary) Gábor Tamási	MF	18	1	4		1		1		10	2	3		29	3	8	
27	(Hungary) Attila Kriston	MF	13	1	3						3		1		16	1	4	
28	(Hungary) Péter Pokorni	GK									6		1		6		1	
49	(Hungary) Sándor Horváth	DF	17		5						8	1	2		25	1	7	
68	(Hungary) László Varga	FW	1								1				2			
73	(Hungary) László Éger	DF	27	4	6	1	1				8	1			36	5	6	1
80	(Hungary) Balázs Brukner	MF									1	1			1	1		
80	(Hungary) János Szabó	MF									6		1		6		1	
83	(Romania) Miklós Belényesi	FW	9	1							3	1			12	2		
86	(Hungary) Balázs Csoknyai	GK																
87	(Hungary) Barnabás Vári	FW	7				1				10	2	2		18	2	2	
89	(Hungary) Roland Bohner	MF									1				1			
89	(Hungary) Roland Pap	FW									1				1			
99	(Hungary) Ferenc Horváth	FW	7	3							2				9	3		
Own goals												1				1		
Totals				48	59	5			1			29	23	2		77	83	7

=== Hat-tricks ===
No.	Player	Against	Result	Date	Competition
8	(Hungary) Tibor Márkus	Honvéd (H)	4–0	3 October 2007	Ligakupa
21	(Hungary) Attila Tököli	Tatabánya (H)	6–0	5 April 2008	Nemzeti Bajnokság I

=== Clean sheets ===
			Clean sheets			
No.	Player	Games Played	Nemzeti Bajnokság I	Magyar Kupa	Ligakupa	Total
1	(Hungary) Attila Kovács	39	4	1	3	8
28	(Hungary) Péter Pokorni	6			1	1
86	(Hungary) Balázs Csoknyai					
Totals			4	1	4	9
