= Balo =

Balo may refer to:

== People ==
- Baló, Hungarian surname
- Mario Balotelli, Italian football player
- Tamás Báló, Hungarian soccer player
- Zoltán Baló, Hungarian military officer

== Other ==
- Balo (instrument), an African musical instrument
- Balo concentric sclerosis, a borderline form of multiple sclerosis
- Balo language, a Grassfields language of Cameroon
- Malka Balo, a woreda (administrative division) in the Oromia Region of Ethiopia
