= János Szabó (footballer, born 1989) =

Hungarian footballer (born 1989)

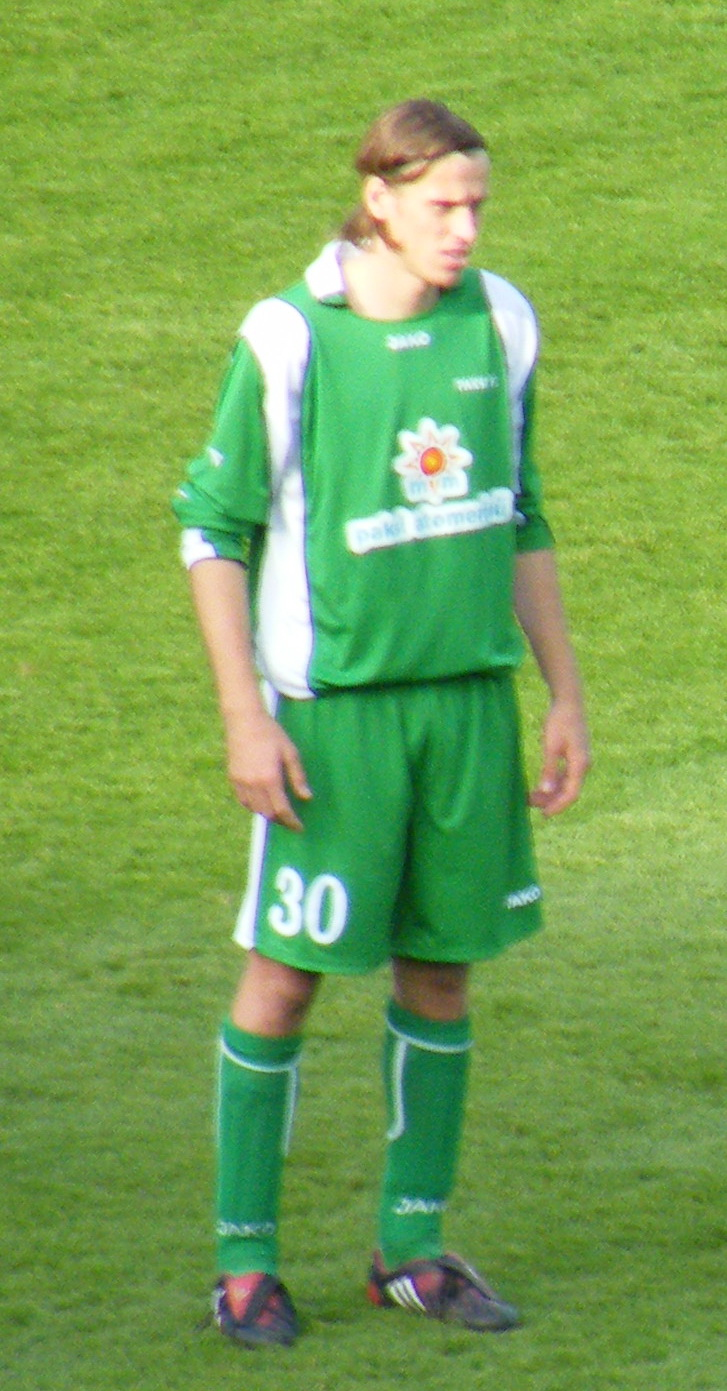

Personal information
- Full name: János Szabó
- Date of birth: 11 July 1989 (age 37)
- Place of birth: Szekszárd, Hungary
- Height: 1.81 m (5 ft 11 1/2 in)
- Positions: Defensive midfielder; centre back; left back

Team information
- Current team: Paks
- Number: 30

Youth career
- 2002–2006: ASE Paks
- 2006–2008: Paks

Senior career*
Years	Team	Apps	(Gls)
2008–	Paks	396	(25)
2008–	Paks II	66	(14)
2011–2012	→ Siófok (loan)	10	(2)

International career
2009	Hungary U20	20	(0)
2009–2010	Hungary U21	15	(0)
2014–2018	Hungary	6	(0)
- * Club domestic league appearances and goals as of 30 May 2026

János Szabó (born 11 July 1989) is a Hungarian professional footballer who plays as a defender for Nemzeti Bajnokság I club Paks.

== Career ==
=== Siófok ===
Szabó was loaned to Siófok in the Nemzeti Bajnokság I on the last day of the 2011 summer transfer window. In an interview, he said he felt uncomfortable at first, when he found out he had to go, but he looks back with a good heart, because he's not sure he would have had as many opportunities in Paks as he did in Siófok at that time.

=== Paks ===
On 15 May 2024, he won the 2024 Magyar Kupa Final with Paks by beating Ferencváros 2–0 at the Puskás Aréna.

On 14 May 2025, he won the 2025 Magyar Kupa final with Paksi FC after beating Ferencvárosi TC 4–3 on penalty shoot-out.

== Club statistics ==
As of match played 14 December 2024

Appearances and goals by club, season and competition
Club	Season	League			National cup (Note: Includes Magyar Kupa)		League cup (Note: Includes Ligakupa)		Europe		Total	
Club	Season	Division	Apps	Goals	Apps	Goals	Apps	Goals	Apps	Goals	Apps	Goals
Paks	2007–08	Nemzeti Bajnokság I	0	0	—		6	0	—		6	0
Paks	2008–09	Nemzeti Bajnokság I	13	1	—		10	1	—		23	2
Paks	2009–10	Nemzeti Bajnokság I	20	0	—		5	0	—		25	0
Paks	2010–11	Nemzeti Bajnokság I	15	0	3	0	9	0	—		27	0
Paks	2011–12	Nemzeti Bajnokság I	14	0	—		1	0	1 (Note: Appearance in UEFA Europa League)	0	16	0
Paks	2012–13	Nemzeti Bajnokság I	25	0	2	0	5	0	—		32	0
Paks	2013–14	Nemzeti Bajnokság I	26	1	—		7	1	—		33	2
Paks	2014–15	Nemzeti Bajnokság I	7	0	—		—		—		7	0
Paks	2015–16	Nemzeti Bajnokság I	30	1	0	0	—		—		30	1
Paks	2016–17	Nemzeti Bajnokság I	19	3	2	0	—		—		21	3
Paks	2017–18	Nemzeti Bajnokság I	32	4	1	0	—		—		33	4
Paks	2018–19	Nemzeti Bajnokság I	19	1	1	0	—		—		20	1
Paks	2019–20	Nemzeti Bajnokság I	32	2	2	0	—		—		34	2
Paks	2020–21	Nemzeti Bajnokság I	30	3	2	0	—		—		32	3
Paks	2021–22	Nemzeti Bajnokság I	26	4	4	2	—		—		30	6
Paks	2022–23	Nemzeti Bajnokság I	26	0	1	0	—		—		27	0
Paks	2023–24	Nemzeti Bajnokság I	24	4	3	0	—		—		27	4
Paks	2024–25	Nemzeti Bajnokság I	8	0	0	0	—		7 (Note: Two appearances in UEFA Europa League, five appearances in UEFA Conference League)	0	15	0
Paks	Total		366	24	21	2	43	2	8	0	438	28
Paks II	2007–08	Nemzeti Bajnokság III	32	7	—		—		—		32	7
Paks II	2008–09	Nemzeti Bajnokság III	17	6	2	1	—		—		19	7
Paks II	2009–10	Nemzeti Bajnokság III	4	0	—		—		—		4	0
Paks II	2010–11	Nemzeti Bajnokság III	7	0	—		—		—		7	0
Paks II	2011–12	Nemzeti Bajnokság II	1	0	—		—		—		1	0
Paks II	2012–13	Nemzeti Bajnokság II	1	0	—		—		—		1	0
Paks II	2020–21	Nemzeti Bajnokság III	2	1	—		—		—		2	1
Paks II	2021–22	Nemzeti Bajnokság III	1	0	—		—		—		1	0
Paks II	2022–23	Nemzeti Bajnokság III	1	0	—		—		—		1	0
Paks II	Total		66	14	2	1	—		—		68	15
Siófok (loan)	2011–12	Nemzeti Bajnokság I	10	2	—		2	0	—		12	2
Career total			442	40	23	3	45	2	8	0	518	45

== Honours ==
Paks

- Ligakupa: 2010–11
- Magyar Kupa: 2023–24, 2024–25

Hungary

- FIFA U-20 World Cup:
  - Third place: 2009

== Videos ==
2011-2012

- Video1 (in Hungarian)
- Video2 (in Hungarian)
