= Baló =

Baló is a Hungarian surname. Notable people with the surname include:

- Elemér Baló (1892 – 1970), Hungarian actor
- György Baló (1947 – 2019), Hungarian broadcast journalist
- József Mátyás Baló (1895–1979), Hungarian physician and biochemist
- Zoltán Baló (1883 – 1966), Hungarian military officer
