= Lóránd Utassy =

Hungarian general

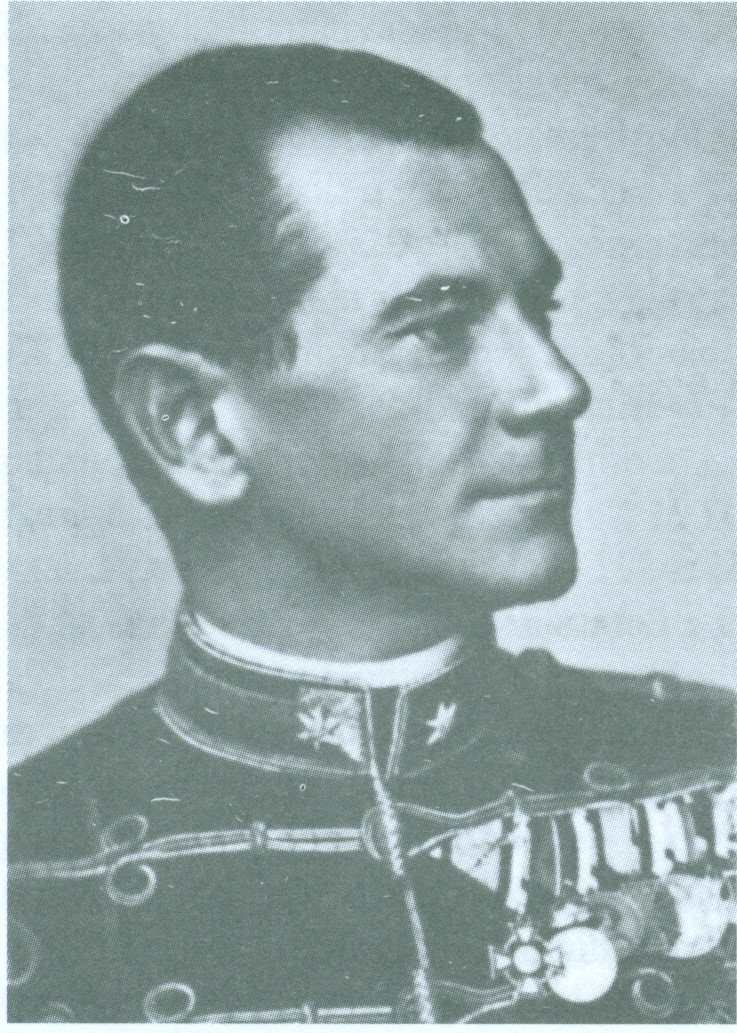
- Utassy Loránd
- Born: 18 April 1897; Budapest, Kingdom of Hungary, Austria-Hungary
- Died: 3 June 1974 (aged 77); Budapest, Hungary
- Military career
- Allegiance: Austria-Hungary (to 1918); Kingdom of Hungary; Hungarian People's Republic
- Branch: Austro-Hungarian Army; Royal Hungarian Army
- Service years: 1917–1946
- Rank: General
- Conflicts: World War I World War II

Lóránd Utassy de Uljak (18 April 1897, Budapest – 3 June 1974, Budapest) was a Hungarian general.

Utassy graduated from the Ludovica Academy. He took part in the World War I in the units of artillery. Between 1921 and 1928 he served at the Hungarian consulate in Munich. Later, he worked for the Ministry of Defence. From 1937 to 1942 he was military attaché in London, Washington, D.C., and Mexico City, as well. In 1942, he was promoted to colonel. In October 1943, Utassy succeeded Zoltán Baló as the head of the Ministry 21st Department for Prisoners of War and Internees, being in charge of thousands of Polish soldiers who were interned in Hungary at that time. Despite the fact that Baló was dismissed under the pressure from the German ambassador who was accusing him of transferring Polish soldiers to Western Europe, Utassy continued his policy to secure Polish soldiers. In March 1944, when the Germans began occupation of Hungary, he denied the Gestapo access to the internment camps and refused to surrender Polish soldiers. He also aimed to establish the Red Cross as the representation of Poles in Hungary. On 16 October 1944, Utassy was arrested by the Hungarian fascists, and deported to Bavaria. After the end of the war, in 1945 he returned to Hungary and was nominated to general. Though, he retired following year. In 1951, the Communist regime designated him as “enemy of the people” — he was demoted and had part of his family property confiscated and sent for two years to the labour camp in Hortobágy.

Utassy died in 1974, aged 77. Buried at the Farkasréti Cemetery. In 1990 he was rehabilitated and promoted to the rank of general.

On 19 June 2019, Utassy was awarded with Virtus et Fraternitas Medal which from president of Poland Andrzej Duda on his behalf received his grandson.
