= Péter Pokorni =

Hungarian footballer

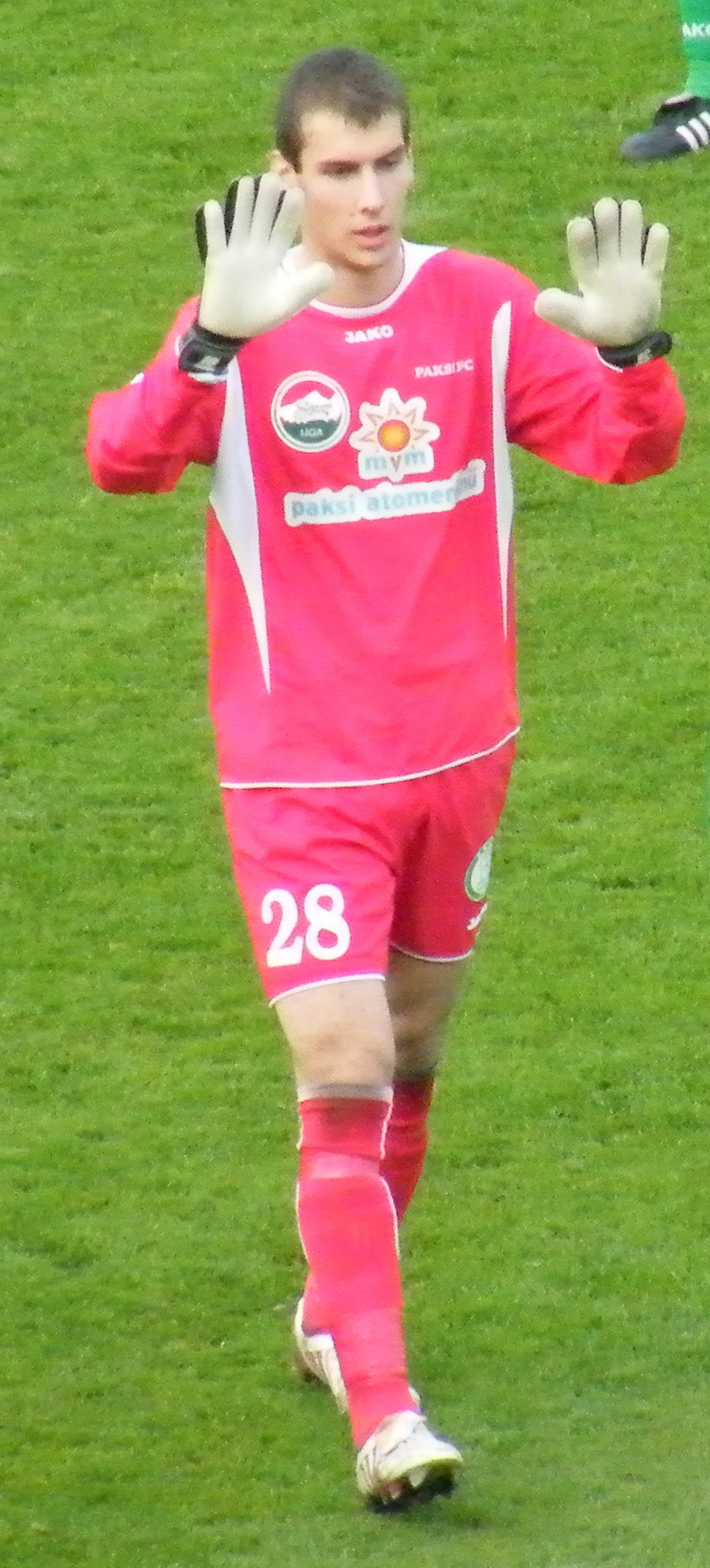

Personal information
- Full name: Péter Pokorni
- Date of birth: 21 November 1989 (age 36)
- Place of birth: Szekszárd, Hungary
- Height: 1.90 m (6 ft 3 in)
- Position: Goalkeeper

Team information
- Current team: Szolnok
- Number: 1

Youth career
- 2003–2004: Dunaújváros
- 2004–2006: Paks

Senior career*
Years	Team	Apps	(Gls)
2007–2009	Paks	6	(0)
2009–2010	MTK	0	(0)
2010–2013	Paks	8	(0)
2013–	Szolnok	73	(0)

International career
2007–2008	Hungary U-19		
- * Club domestic league appearances and goals as of 13 August 2015

Péter Pokorni (born 21 November 1989 in Paks) is a Hungarian football player who plays for Paksi SE.
