= Gábor Vayer =

Hungarian football player

Personal information
- Date of birth: 18 May 1977 (age 49)
- Place of birth: Paks, Hungary
- Height: 1.78 m (5 ft 10 in)
- Position: Midfielder

Team information
- Current team: Mezőörs KSE
- Number: 20

Senior career*
Years	Team	Apps	(Gls)
1993–1997	Paks	63	(17)
1997–2001	Győr	135	(36)
2001–2004	Santa Clara	21	(3)
2004–2005	Portosantense	16	(4)
2005–2006	Morphou	24	(3)
2006–2008	Videoton	16	(2)
2006	→ Bnei Lod (loan)	0	(0)
2008–2010	ŁKS Łódź	24	(1)
2010–2013	Paks	96	(15)
2013–2014	Zalaegerszeg	7	(0)
2014	UFC Purbach am See		
2014–2015	SC Zöbern		
2015–2017	SC Frauenkirche		
2017–2018	UFC Tadten		
2020–2023	Ménfőcsanak ESK		
2023–	Mezőörs KSE		

International career
1996–2000	Hungary U21	11	(0)
- * Club domestic league appearances and goals as of 18 May 2024

Gábor Vayer (born 18 May 1977) is a Hungarian footballer who plays as a midfielder for Mezőörs KSE.
