= Zoltán Baló =

Hungarian military officer (1883–1966)

- Born: January 23, 1883
- Died: December 10, 1966 (aged 83)
- Military career
- Allegiance: Austria-Hungary; Hungary
- Branch: Landwehr/Army
- Rank: Major General
- Commands: XXI Directorate
- Conflicts: World War I World War II

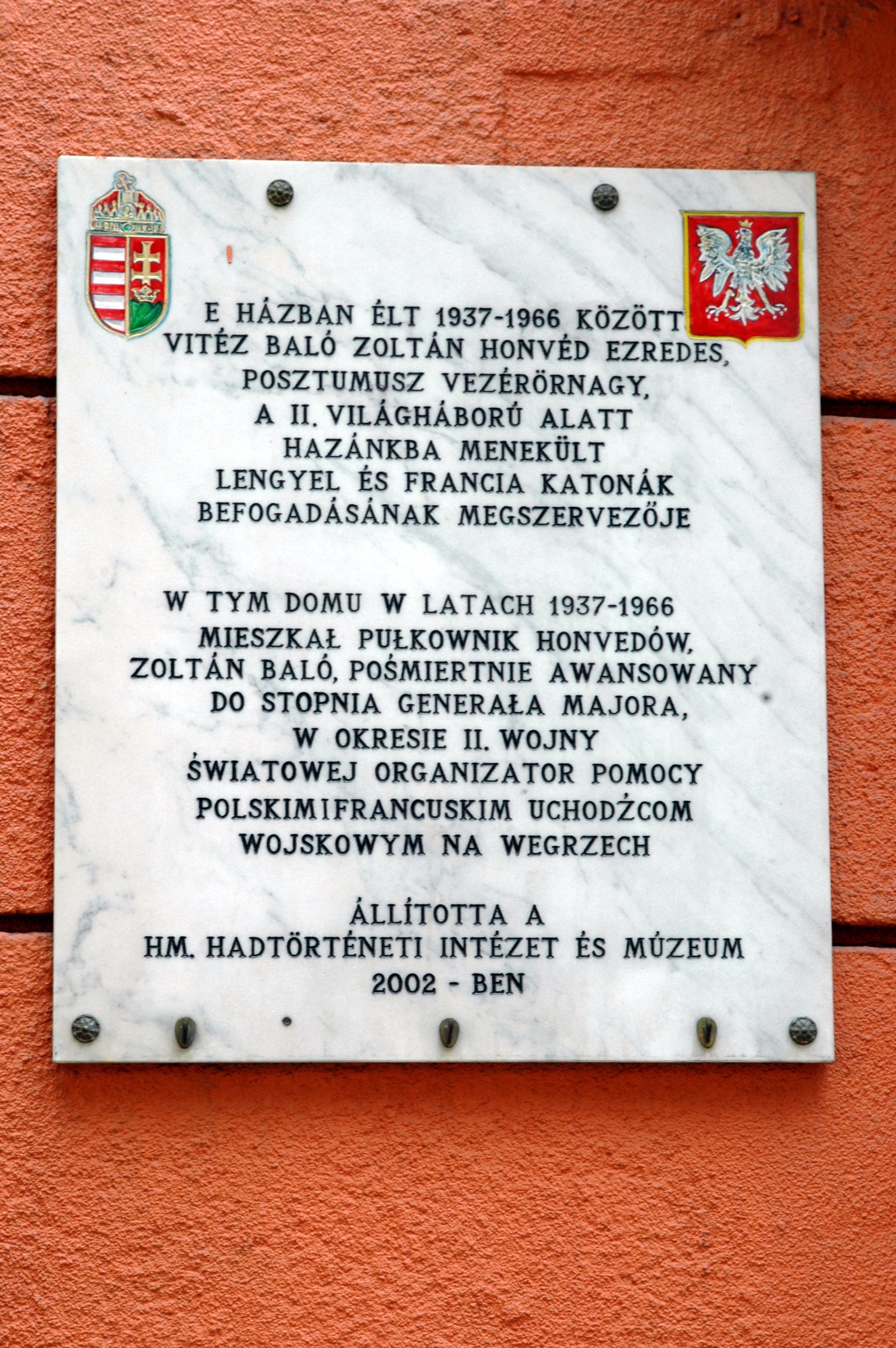
A memorial tablet to Zoltan Baló, erected on his house in Budapest

Zoltán Baló (23 January 1883 – 10 December 1966) was a Hungarian military officer and a Colonel of the Royal Hungarian Home Defence Force and its successor, the Royal Hungarian Home Defence Force. He is best known for his help to Polish and French military refugees in Hungary during World War II.

== Biography ==
Born in 1883 in the Kingdom of Hungary, he received military education early in his life and took part in World War I. In the mid-1920s he became a director at one of the departments of the Ministry of Defence. He also held a number of other military posts in the interbellum. Following the outbreak of the Invasion of Poland in 1939, the Hungarian government created the XXI Directorate of the Ministry of Defence, whose purpose was to help the Polish military refugees.

Baló, then in the rank of Colonel, became the head of the directorate. His sympathetic stance allowed a large part of the 50,000 men strong group of Polish soldiers who reached Hungary in 1939 to escape from poorly guarded internment camps and join the Polish Army in the West. He was followed on the post by Lóránd Utassy. Baló was briefly arrested by the Germans after their takeover of Hungary in 1944, he returned to Budapest.

== Death ==
He retired in 1946 and died on 10 December 1966, aged 83.

== Awards/legacy ==
Posthumously he was promoted to the rank of Major General. After the dissolution of the Soviet system in Central Europe, Baló's merits were posthumously credited and he was awarded several notable Polish and Hungarian medals, including the Officer's Cross of the Order of Merit of the Republic of Poland (1999). A street in the Warsaw borough of Ursynów is named after him.
