= István Nagy (footballer, born 1986) =

Hungarian footballer (born 1986)

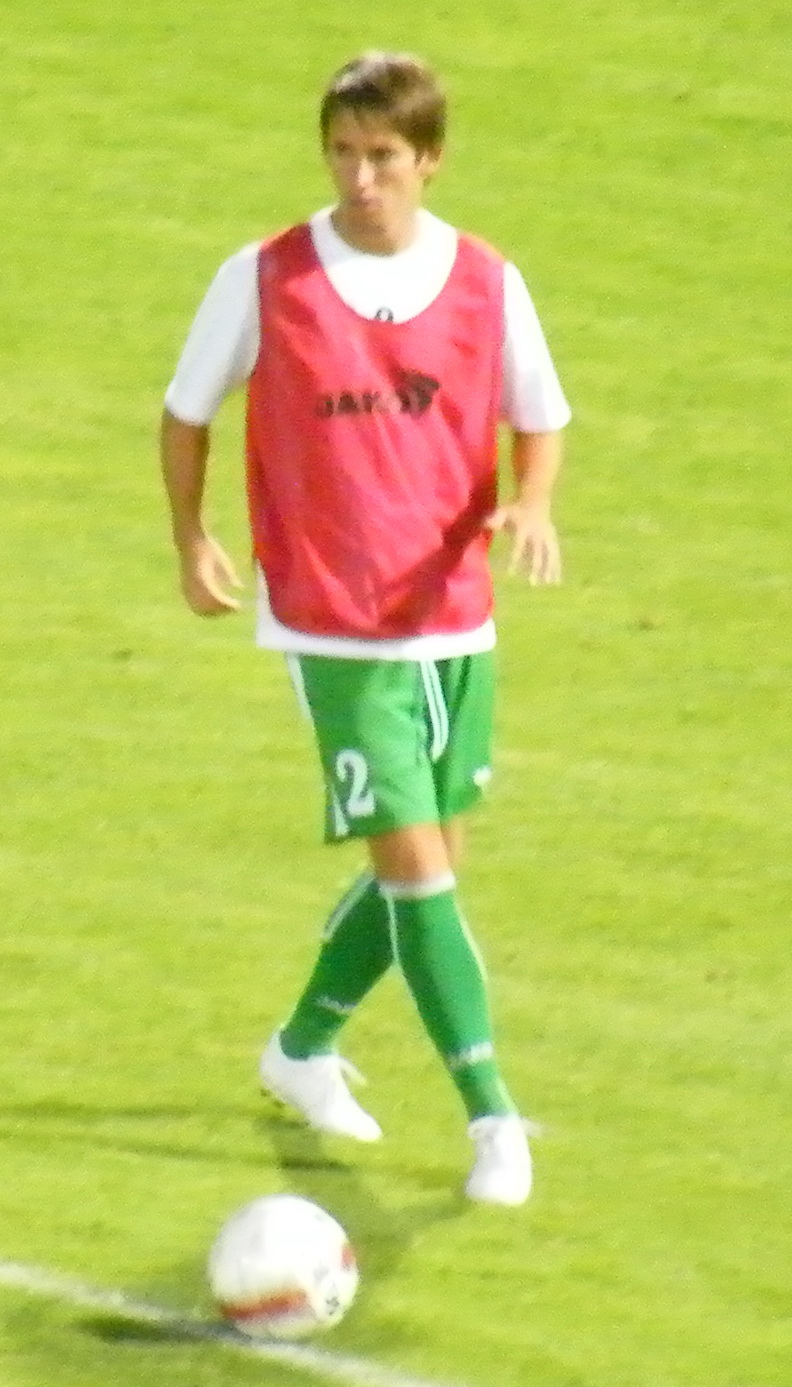
- István Nagy

Personal information
- Date of birth: 16 May 1986 (age 40)
- Place of birth: Dunaújváros, Hungary
- Height: 1.86 m (6 ft 1 in)
- Position: Forward

Team information
- Current team: Bölcskei SE

Senior career*
Years	Team	Apps	(Gls)
2004–2009	Dunaújváros	70	(13)
2009–2013	Paks	20	(2)
2012	→ Siófok (loan)	6	(0)
2012–2013	→ Szolnok (loan)	23	(9)
2013–2016	Szolnok	64	(18)
2016–2018	Békéscsaba	63	(14)
2018–2019	Dorog	10	(2)
2019	Mosonmagyaróvár	16	(2)
2019–2021	Ajka	29	(4)
2021	Kecskemét	14	(2)
2021–	Bölcskei SE	0	(0)
- * Club domestic league appearances and goals as of 30 May 2021

István Nagy (born 16 May 1986) is a Hungarian football player who plays for Bölcskei SE.
