= Attila Kovács (footballer, born 1981) =

Hungarian footballer

Personal information
- Date of birth: 17 February 1981 (age 45)
- Place of birth: Budapest, Hungary
- Height: 1.82 m (5 ft 11 1/2 in)
- Position: Goalkeeper

Youth career
- 1995–2000: MTK

Senior career*
Years	Team	Apps	(Gls)
2001–2002	Csepel		
2002–2003	Tatabánya	5	(0)
2003–2004	Balassagyarmat		
2004–2013	Paks	119	(0)
2013	Veszprém	10	(0)
2013–2015	Cegléd	27	(0)
2015–2016	Csákvár	4	(0)
- * Club domestic league appearances and goals

Attila Kovács (born 17 February 1981) is a Hungarian former football player.
