= László Éger =

Hungarian footballer (born 1977)

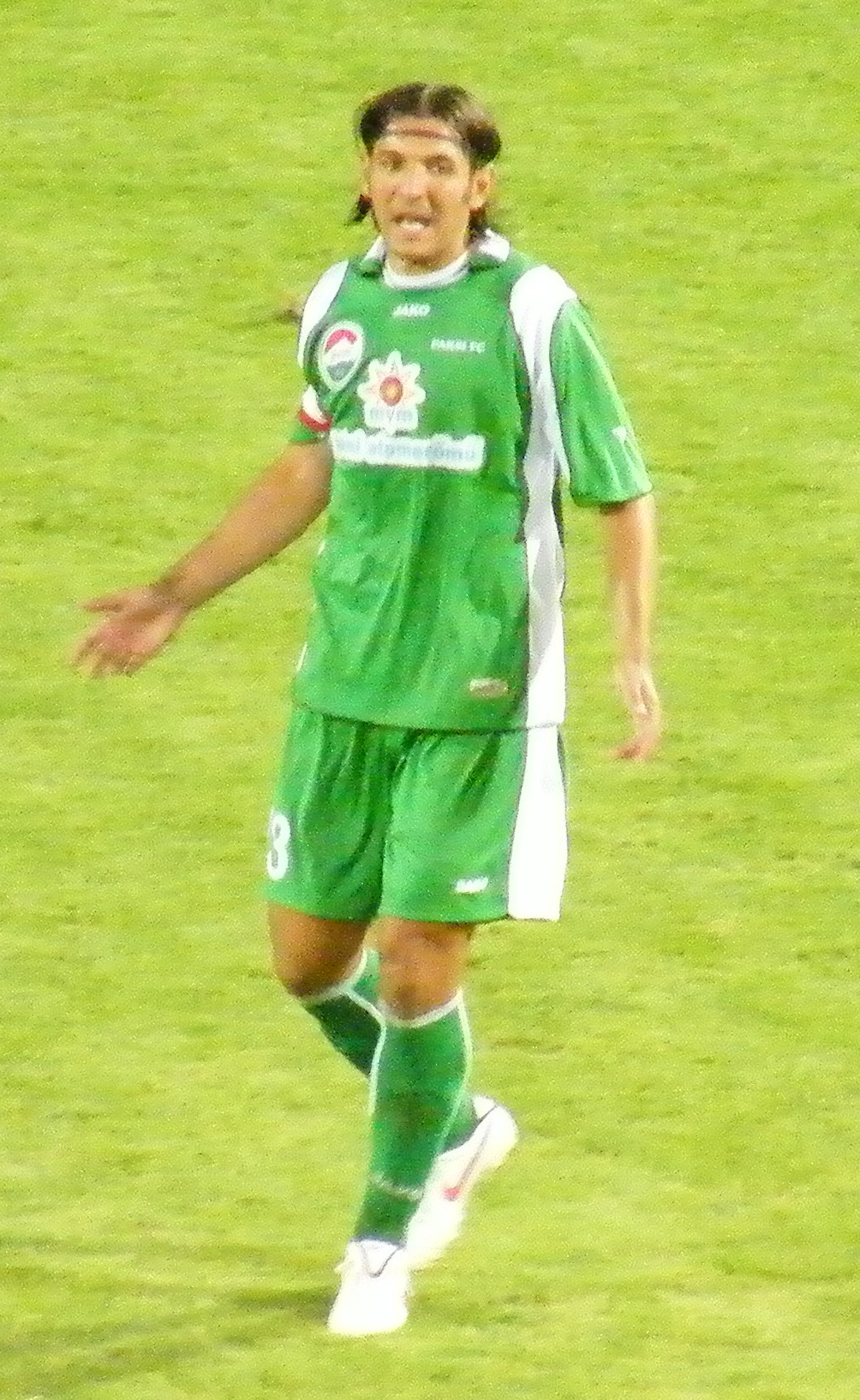

Personal information
- Date of birth: 7 May 1977 (age 49)
- Place of birth: Paks, Hungary
- Height: 1.88 m (6 ft 2 in)
- Position: Centre-back

Senior career*
Years	Team	Apps	(Gls)
1994	Paks	9	(0)
1995	UFC Szekszárd	10	(2)
1995–1998	Paks	87	(4)
1998–2002	Dunaújváros	133	(3)
2003–2006	Debrecen	95	(13)
2006–2007	Poli Ejido	9	(0)
2007–2014	Paks	185	(19)

International career
1996–2000	Hungary U21	13	(0)
2004–2006	Hungary	9	(0)

Managerial career
- 2014–: Paks (assistant coach)
- * Club domestic league appearances and goals

László Éger (born 7 May 1977) is a Hungarian former professional footballer who played as a centre-back.

== Professional career ==
He made nine appearances for the Hungary national team and also played for Debreceni VSC. On 16 May 2007, Éger terminated his contract with Spanish club Poli Ejido and returned to Paks.
