= Tamás Kiss (footballer, born 1979) =

Hungarian footballer

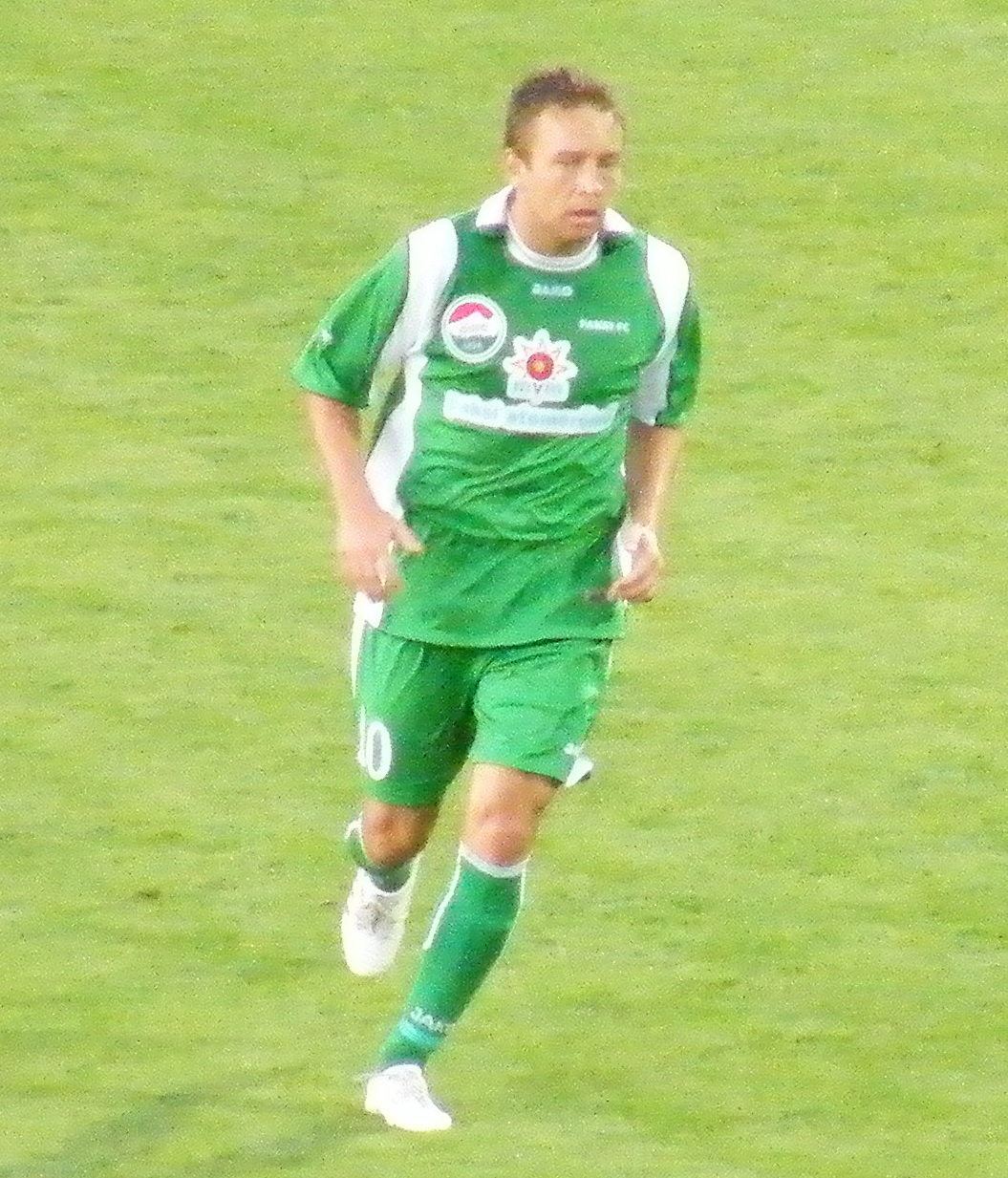
- Kiss in 2009

Personal information
- Full name: Tamás Kiss
- Date of birth: 27 September 1979 (age 47)
- Place of birth: Szekszárd, Hungary
- Height: 1.80 m (5 ft 11 in)
- Position: Midfielder

Team information
- Current team: Paks
- Number: 10

Senior career*
Years	Team	Apps	(Gls)
1996–1997	Szekszárd	?	(?)
1997–1998	Bonyhád	?	(?)
1998–1999	Szálka	?	(?)
1999–2000	Atomerőmű	14	(3)
2000–2004	Hévíz	12	(2)
2004–	Paks	223	(33)
- * Club domestic league appearances and goals as of 30 November 2014

Tamás Kiss (born 27 September 1979 in Szekszárd) is a Hungarian football player who currently plays for Paksi SE.
