= Fehérvári úti Stadion =

Football stadium in Paks, Tolna, Hungary

Coordinates: 46°38′1″N 18°51′9″E

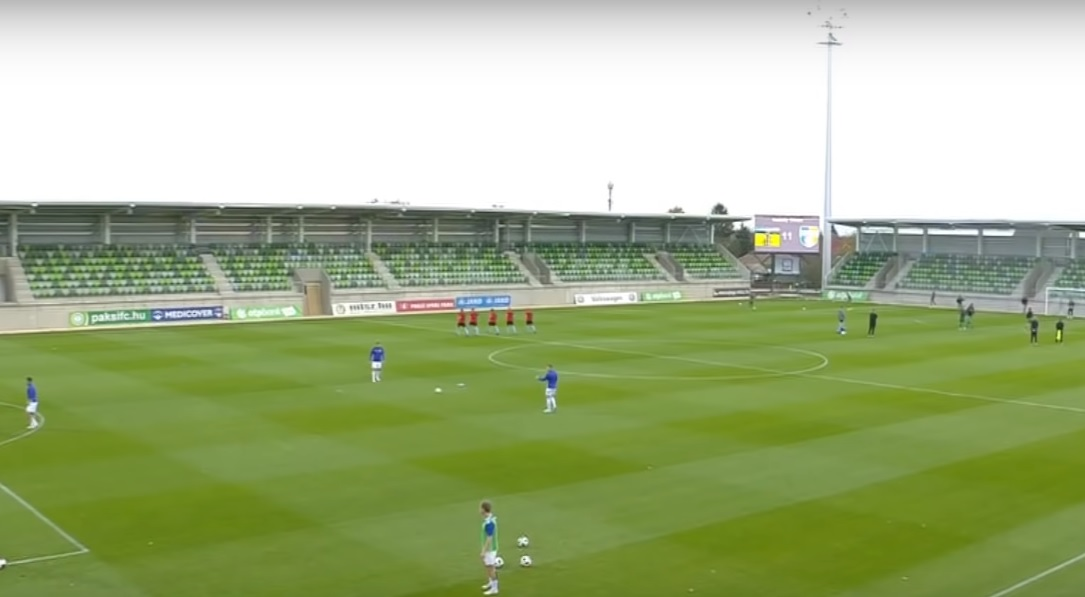
- Interactive map of Fehérvári úti Stadion
- Full name: Fehérvári úti Stadion
- Location: Paks, Hungary
- Owner: Paksi FC
- Capacity: 4,671
- Surface: Grass; Field
- Field size: 105 m × 68 m (344 ft × 223 ft)

Construction
- Groundbreaking: 1965
- Built: 1965-66
- Opened: 1966, 2020
- Renovated: 2016
- Expanded: 2018
- Cost: c. 1,4 billion HUF

Tenant
- Paksi FC

Website
- www.paksifc.hu

Fehérvári úti Stadion is a multi-use stadium in Paks, Hungary. It is currently used mostly for football matches and is the home stadium of Paksi FC. The stadium is able to hold 5,000 people.

== History ==
On 21 January 2016, it was revealed that a new stadium will be built in Paks. The new stadium will be finished by the start of the 2016–17 Nmezeti bajnokság I season. János Süli, mayor of Paks, said that the reconstruction will start in May 2016 when the 2015–16 Nemzeti Bajnokság I season finished. The Hungarian state provided 800 million HUF, while the local government 600 million HUF for the reconstruction. Four new covered stands were built in 2018 and the capacity was increased to around 5,000 spectators.

The reconstruction ended in 2020 and the first official match was played between Paks and Újpest FC on the first match day of the 2020-21 Nemzeti Bajnokság I season on 15 August 2020.

In an interview with János Szabó, player of Paks, said that players of the other clubs did not like playing at Fehérvári Út because everything was so small including the restroom. It was very difficult for the away team to speed up for the match. Many times it happened when the away team woke up, the result was 2-0 for the home side.

Before the opening ceremony, the gates will be opened for the public, Tamás Méhes, the communication director of Paks, said. There were several programs such as football for kids, and freestyle. The entrance for the opening match was free.

== Milestone matches ==
15 August 2020	Paks (Hungary)	1–3	(Hungary) Újpest	2020–21 Nemzeti Bajnokság I First Nemzeti Bajnokság I match
	Ádám 76'	(Report)	Simon 16' 62'	Referee: Ádám Fakas (Hungary)

== Attendances ==
As of 11 April 2017.

Season	Average
2013–14	1,167
2014–15	1,448
2015–16	1,303
2016–17	1,508

== Gallery ==
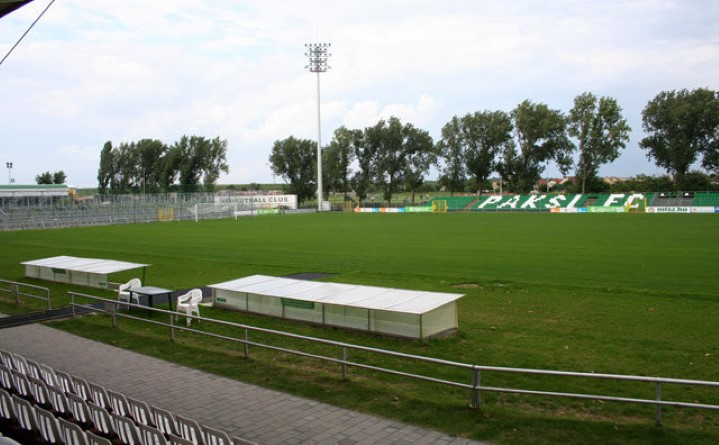
The stadium before the reconstruction in 2015

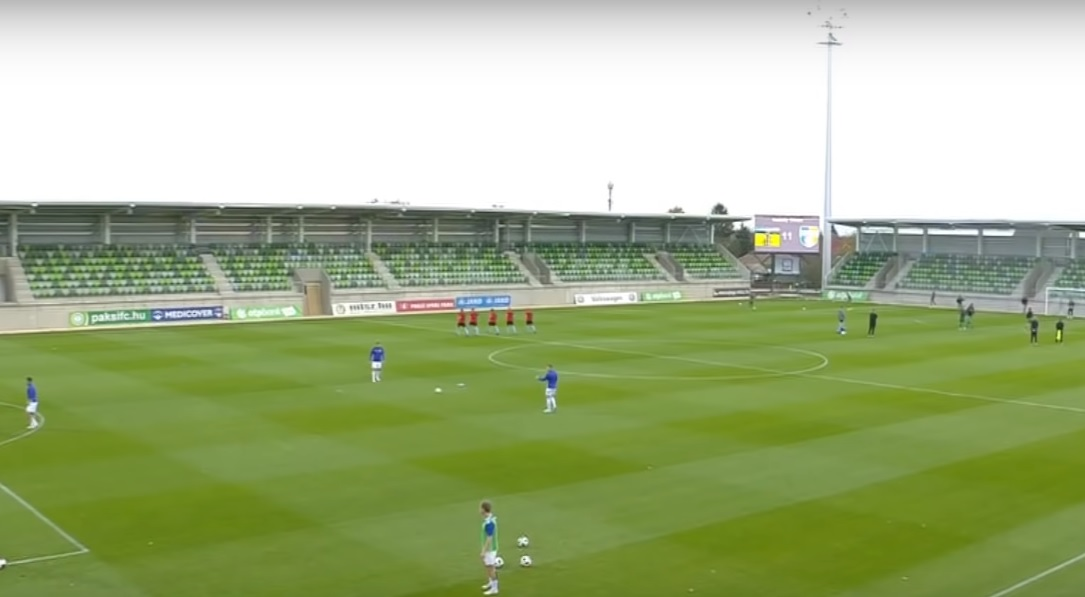
Paks-Diósgyőr on 15 December 2018 in the 2018–19 Nemzeti Bajnokság I
