= Tamás Báló =

Hungarian footballer

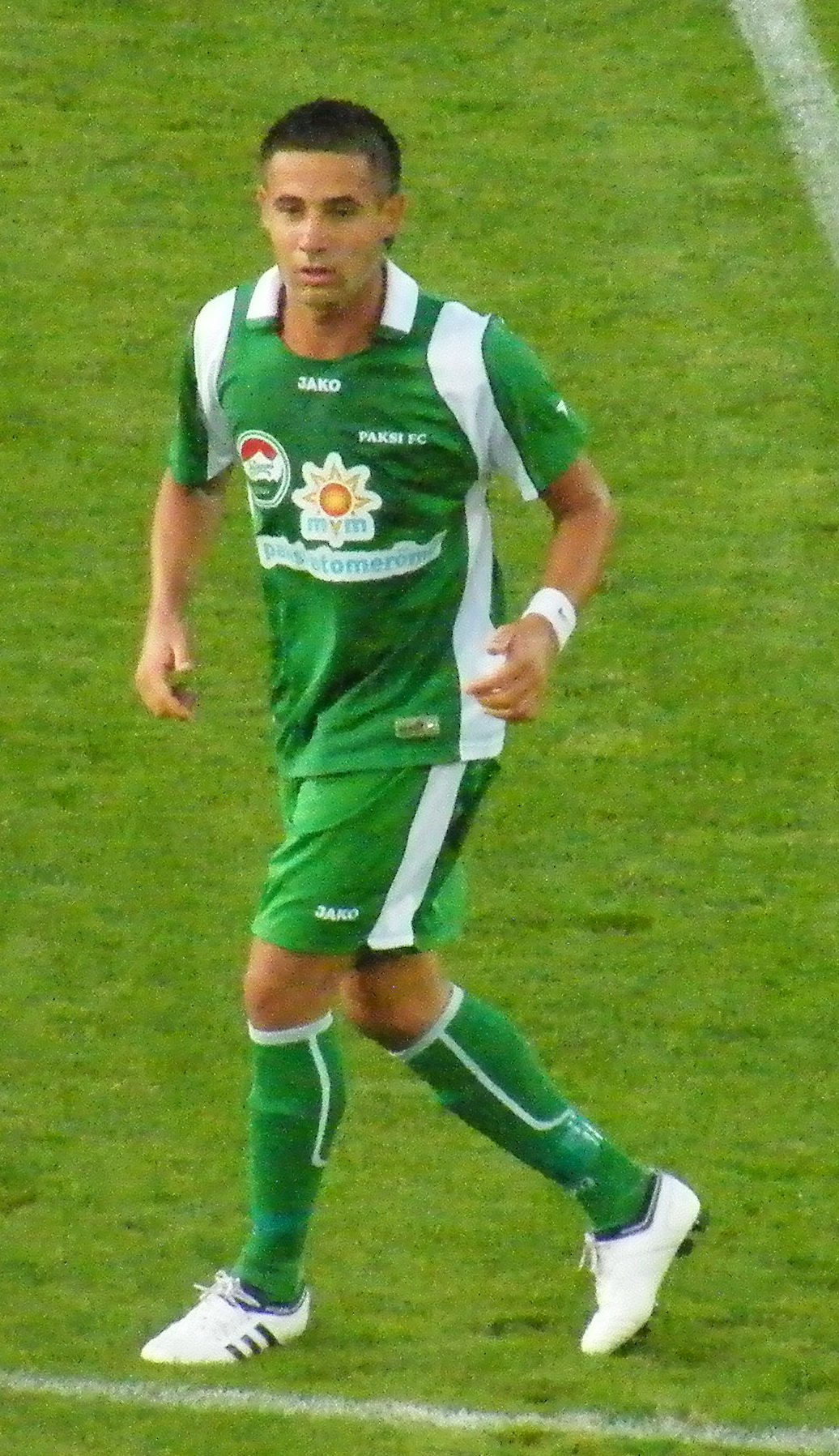

Personal information
- Date of birth: 12 January 1984 (age 42)
- Place of birth: Kalocsa, Hungary
- Height: 1.73 m (5 ft 8 in)
- Position: Left back

Team information
- Current team: Dunaújváros

Youth career
- 2000–2002: Dusnok

Senior career*
Years	Team	Apps	(Gls)
2002–2005	Dunaújváros	56	(3)
2005–2020	Paks	220	(22)
2020–	Dunaújváros	0	(0)
- * Club domestic league appearances and goals as of 15 December 2019

Tamás Báló (born 12 January 1984) is a Hungarian football player who plays for Dunaújváros.

== Honours ==
Paksi SE
Hungarian Second Division: Winner 2006

== Career statistics ==
Appearances and goals by club, season and competition
Club	Season	League			Cup		League Cup		Europe		Total	
Club	Season	Division	Apps	Goals	Apps	Goals	Apps	Goals	Apps	Goals	Apps	Goals
Dunaújváros
Dunaújváros	2002–03	Nemzeti Bajnokság I	13	0	0	0	—		—		13	0
Dunaújváros	2003–04	Nemzeti Bajnokság I	28	2	0	0	—		—		28	2
Dunaújváros	2004–05	Nemzeti Bajnokság II	15	1	1	1	—		—		16	2
Dunaújváros	Total		56	3	1	1	0	0	0	0	57	4
Paks	2005–06	Nemzeti Bajnokság II	25	11	2	0	—		—		27	11
Paks	2006–07	Nemzeti Bajnokság I	19	1	1	0	—		—		20	1
Paks	2007–08	Nemzeti Bajnokság I	20	2	0	0	10	4	—		30	6
Paks	2008–09	Nemzeti Bajnokság I	20	3	1	0	5	0	—		26	3
Paks	2009–10	Nemzeti Bajnokság I	7	0	0	0	5	0	—		12	0
Paks	2010–11	Nemzeti Bajnokság I	17	0	4	0	5	0	—		26	0
Paks	2011–12	Nemzeti Bajnokság I	16	0	1	0	4	0	5	0	26	0
Paks	2012–13	Nemzeti Bajnokság I	14	0	3	0	3	0	—		20	0
Paks	2013–14	Nemzeti Bajnokság I	21	1	1	0	5	0	—		27	1
Paks	2014–15	Nemzeti Bajnokság I	27	4	0	0	1	0	—		28	4
Paks	2015–16	Nemzeti Bajnokság I	4	0	1	1	—		—		5	1
Paks	2016–17	Nemzeti Bajnokság I	16	0	0	0	—		—		16	0
Paks	2017–18	Nemzeti Bajnokság I	1	0	5	0	—		—		6	0
Paks	2018–19	Nemzeti Bajnokság I	11	0	2	0	—		—		13	0
Paks	2019–20	Nemzeti Bajnokság I	2	0	6	1	—		—		8	1
Paks	Total		220	22	27	2	38	4	5	0	290	28
Career total			276	25	28	3	38	4	5	0	347	32

Updated to games played as of 11 March 2020.
