= List of Hungarian football transfers summer 2018 =

This is a list of Hungarian football transfers during the 2018 summer transfer window, organized by club. Only transfers involving teams from Nemzeti Bajnokság I, and Nemzeti Bajnokság II are included.

== Nemzeti Bajnokság I ==
=== Budapest Honvéd ===
In: Note: Flags indicate national team as defined under FIFA eligibility rules; some limited exceptions apply. Players may hold more than one non-FIFA nationality.

No.	Pos.	Nation	Player
3	DF	NGA	Eke Uzoma (from Balmazújváros)
7	DF	HUN	Bence Batik (from Ferencváros)
8	MF	HUN	Gergő Holdampf (from Nyíregyháza)
9	MF	HUN	Krisztián Vadócz (from (Hong Kong) Kitchee)
14	DF	HUN	Nikolasz Kovács (from Honvéd U-19)
17	MF	CZE	Tomáš Pilík (from (Czech Republic) Zbrojovka Brno)
20	FW	HUN	Dominik Cipf (from Honvéd U-19)
21	MF	GUI	Fousseni Bamba (from (Ukraine) Chornomorets Odesa)
26	DF	CRO	Dino Škvorc (from (Armenia) Alashkert)
29	FW	HUN	Patrik Tischler (loan from Újpest)
55	MF	HUN	Norbert Szendrei (from Honvéd U-19)
60	DF	HUN	Attila Temesvári (from Honvéd U-19)
89	FW	FRA	David Ngog (from (Scotland) Ross County)
—	MF	HUN	Dániel Kovács (loan return from Dorog)
—	DF	ROU	Raul Palmes (loan return from Kazincbarcika)
—	MF	HUN	Dániel Göblyös (loan return from Dorog)

Out: Note: Flags indicate national team as defined under FIFA eligibility rules; some limited exceptions apply. Players may hold more than one non-FIFA nationality.

No.	Pos.	Nation	Player
2	DF	HUN	Dávid Bobál (to (Czech Republic) Dukla Prague)
7	FW	ITA	Davide Lanzafame (to Ferencváros)
8	DF	NGA	George Ikenne (to MTK Budapest)
9	FW	HUN	Márton Eppel (to (Kazakhstan) Kairat)
9	MF	HUN	Krisztián Vadócz
11	FW	COD	Kadima Kabangu (to (Armenia) Shirak)
61	DF	SVK	Tomáš Košút
92	FW	HUN	Kristóf Herjeczki (loan to Gyirmót)
93	MF	HUN	Dávid Stoiacovici (loan to Tiszakécske)
96	FW	HUN	Dániel Lukács (loan to Újpest)
98	FW	HUN	Bálint Tömösvári (loan to Kaposvár)
—	DF	ROU	Raul Palmes (loan to Kazincbarcika)
—	MF	HUN	Dániel Kovács (to ESMTK)
—	MF	HUN	Dániel Göblyös

=== Debrecen ===
In: Note: Flags indicate national team as defined under FIFA eligibility rules; some limited exceptions apply. Players may hold more than one non-FIFA nationality.

No.	Pos.	Nation	Player
18	MF	HUN	Attila Haris (from Balmazújváros)
19	MF	ESP	Ezequiel Calvente (from Békéscsaba)
26	FW	HUN	Alex Damásdi (from Cegléd)
27	MF	HUN	Ádám Bódi (from Videoton)
28	DF	HUN	Ádám Újvárosi (from Debrecen U-19)
44	DF	SVK	Erik Čikoš (from (Slovakia) Slovan Bratislava)
71	FW	ALB	Albion Avdijaj (loan from (Switzerland) Grasshoppers)
88	FW	HUN	Márk Szécsi (loan from Puskás Akadémia)
—	MF	HUN	Nándor Kóródi (from Debrecen U-19)
—	DF	HUN	Tibor Bokros (loan return from Balmazújváros)

Out: Note: Flags indicate national team as defined under FIFA eligibility rules; some limited exceptions apply. Players may hold more than one non-FIFA nationality.

No.	Pos.	Nation	Player
10	FW	HUN	Tibor Tisza (Retired)
19	MF	CMR	Justin Mengolo (to (Turkey) Karabükspor)
27	MF	HUN	Ádám Bódi (loan return to Videoton)
99	MF	HUN	Bence Sós (to Videoton)
—	DF	HUN	Tibor Bokros (to Cigánd)

=== Diósgyőr ===
In: Note: Flags indicate national team as defined under FIFA eligibility rules; some limited exceptions apply. Players may hold more than one non-FIFA nationality.

No.	Pos.	Nation	Player
6	MF	HUN	Mátyás Tajti (from (Spain) Atlético Malagueño)
10	FW	HUN	Richárd Vernes (from Zalaegerszeg)
11	MF	SVK	Martin Juhar (from (Czech Republic) Zbrojovka Brno)
14	MF	HUN	Dávid Márkvárt (from Puskás Akadémia)
20	MF	HUN	Bence Szabó (loan from Videoton)
24	FW	ROU	István Fülöp (loan return from (Romania) Sepsi)
28	MF	CRO	Tomislav Mazalović (from (Croatia) Inter Zaprešić)
33	DF	HUN	Kristóf Polgár (from Szombathelyi Haladás)
79	FW	HUN	József Varga (from Diósgyőr U-19)
91	FW	SRB	Branko Mihajlović (from (Israel) Hapoel Petah Tikva)
—	MF	HUN	Balázs Szabó (loan return from Siófok)
—	FW	HUN	Gábor Boros (loan return from Kazincbarcika)

Out: Note: Flags indicate national team as defined under FIFA eligibility rules; some limited exceptions apply. Players may hold more than one non-FIFA nationality.

No.	Pos.	Nation	Player
6	MF	ESP	Diego Vela
10	FW	HUN	Roland Ugrai (to (Greece) Atromitos)
11	MF	HUN	Balázs Szabó (loan to Balmazújváros)
14	FW	HUN	Zsolt Óvári (loan to Balmazújváros)
16	FW	GRE	Nikolaos Ioannidis (to (Portugal) Marítimo)
20	MF	HUN	Attila Busai
21	DF	HUN	Gergő Kocsis (loan return to (Slovakia) Dunajská Streda)
24	FW	ROU	István Fülöp (to (Romania) Sepsi)
27	FW	SVK	Ákos Szarka (to Gyirmót)
74	MF	HUN	Patrik Ternován (loan to Balmazújváros)
—	FW	HUN	Gábor Boros (loan to Budafok)

=== Ferencváros ===
In: Note: Flags indicate national team as defined under FIFA eligibility rules; some limited exceptions apply. Players may hold more than one non-FIFA nationality.

No.	Pos.	Nation	Player
5	DF	GHA	Abraham Frimpong (from (Serbia) Red Star Belgrade)
7	FW	ISL	Kjartan Finnbogason (from (Denmark) Horsens)
10	FW	ITA	Davide Lanzafame (from Budapest Honvéd)
15	MF	ARG	Matías Rodríguez (from (Argentina) Chacarita Juniors)
17	MF	HUN	Kornél Csernik (loan return from Soroksár)
18	MF	HUN	Dávid Sigér (from Balmazújváros)
26	DF	GER	Marcel Heister (from (Israel) Beitar Jerusalem)
34	MF	UKR	Ivan Petryak (loan from (Ukraine) Shakhtar Donetsk)
99	FW	HUN	Norbert Kundrák (loan return from Soroksár)
—	DF	HUN	Erik Silye (loan return from Soroksár)

Out: Note: Flags indicate national team as defined under FIFA eligibility rules; some limited exceptions apply. Players may hold more than one non-FIFA nationality.

No.	Pos.	Nation	Player
5	DF	BRA	Marquinhos Pedroso (loan return to (Brazil) Figueirense)
7	DF	HUN	Bence Batik (to Budapest Honvéd)
14	MF	HUN	Dominik Nagy (loan return to (Poland) Legia Warsaw)
15	MF	HUN	Tamás Hajnal (Retired)
20	MF	HUN	Zoltán Gera (Retired)
27	FW	HUN	Tamás Priskin (loan to Szombathelyi Haladás)
28	MF	GHA	Joseph Paintsil (loan return to (Ghana) Tema Youth)
37	DF	GER	Janek Sternberg (to (Germany) 1. FC Kaiserslautern)
—	DF	HUN	Erik Silye (loan to Mezőkövesd)

=== Kisvárda ===
In: Note: Flags indicate national team as defined under FIFA eligibility rules; some limited exceptions apply. Players may hold more than one non-FIFA nationality.

No.	Pos.	Nation	Player
1	GK	ROU	Mihai Mincă (from (Romania) Energeticianul)
7	FW	BRA	Sassá (from (Brazil) Portuguesa)
14	DF	ROU	Cornel Ene (from (Romania) Daco-Getica)
16	DF	UKR	Pavlo Lukyanchuk (loan from (Ukraine) Dynamo Kyiv)
17	FW	UKR	Anton Shynder (from (Kazakhstan) Tobol)
26	DF	GRE	Thodoris Berios (from (Greece) Giannina)
29	MF	SRB	Vuk Mitošević (from (Serbia) Javor Ivanjica)
33	DF	UKR	Temur Partsvania (from (Ukraine) Olimpik Donetsk)
36	DF	BRA	Anderson Pico (from (Brazil) São Paulo)
70	FW	UKR	Artem Milevskyi (from (Belarus) Dinamo Brest)
84	GK	BRA	Felipe (from (Brazil) Uberlândia)
91	MF	UKR	Roman Karasyuk (from (Ukraine) Veres Rivne)
93	FW	ROU	Sergiu Negruț (from (Bulgaria) Beroe)
—	FW	HUN	Ferenc Rácz (from Balmazújváros)

Out: Note: Flags indicate national team as defined under FIFA eligibility rules; some limited exceptions apply. Players may hold more than one non-FIFA nationality.

No.	Pos.	Nation	Player
1	GK	HUN	Illés Zöldesi (loan return to Videoton)
3	DF	HUN	Krisztián Vermes (to Unione)
3	DF	UKR	Robert Molnar (to Soroksár)
7	MF	HUN	Norbert Heffler (to Gyirmót)
8	MF	CZE	Marek Střeštík (to Gyirmót)
12	GK	HUN	Tamás Molnár-Farkas (to Szolnok)
15	DF	HUN	Barna Papucsek (to Balmazújváros)
17	DF	HUN	Sergiu Oltean (to Kazincbarcika)
17	FW	UKR	Anton Shynder
20	MF	HUN	Gergő Oláh (to Szeged)
22	MF	UKR	Yuriy Toma (to Kazincbarcika)
44	DF	UKR	Grygoriy Zanko (loan to Cigánd)
87	FW	HUN	Gergely Délczeg
88	FW	ROU	Raymond Lukács (to Kazincbarcika)

=== Mezőkövesd ===
In: Note: Flags indicate national team as defined under FIFA eligibility rules; some limited exceptions apply. Players may hold more than one non-FIFA nationality.

No.	Pos.	Nation	Player
6	MF	CMR	Patrick Mevoungou (from Puskás Akadémia)
8	MF	HUN	Richárd Nagy (from Vác)
8	MF	HUN	Máté Tóth (loan from Haladás)
9	FW	BRA	André Alves (from (Cyprus) Anorthosis)
11	MF	HUN	Dénes Szakály (from Paks)
12	GK	HUN	Viktor Szentpéteri (from MTK Budapest)
25	GK	HUN	Péter Szappanos (from Zalaegerszeg)
33	MF	HUN	Gábor Molnár (loan from Puskás Akadémia)
70	DF	HUN	Erik Silye (loan from Ferencváros)
77	MF	UKR	Shandor Vayda (from Balmazújváros)
97	MF	UKR	Mykhaylo Meskhi (from (Ukraine) Stal Kamianske)
99	DF	HUN	Dominik Wieland (loan from Ferencváros U-19)

Out: Note: Flags indicate national team as defined under FIFA eligibility rules; some limited exceptions apply. Players may hold more than one non-FIFA nationality.

No.	Pos.	Nation	Player
3	DF	SVK	Dominik Fótyik (to Kazincbarcika)
4	MF	CRO	Frano Mlinar
5	MF	HUN	Bálint Oláh (loan to Budafok)
6	DF	HUN	Gergő Gohér (to Budafok)
8	FW	HUN	Roland Baracskai (loan to Győr)
8	MF	HUN	Richárd Nagy (loan to Kaposvár)
9	FW	HUN	Csanád Novák (loan to Zalaegerszeg)
11	MF	HUN	István Bognár (to MTK Budapest)
13	GK	SVK	Ladislav Rybánsky (to Békéscsaba)
16	MF	HUN	István Csirmaz (loan to Cegléd)
23	MF	CMR	Fabrice Onana
27	MF	SVK	Patrik Mišák (loan return to (Poland) Nieciecza)
31	GK	HUN	Tamás Horváth (to Győr)
85	GK	HUN	Pál Tarczy (to (Austria) Großpetersdorf)
99	MF	HUN	Márk Murai (to Vác)

=== MTK Budapest ===
In: Note: Flags indicate national team as defined under FIFA eligibility rules; some limited exceptions apply. Players may hold more than one non-FIFA nationality.

No.	Pos.	Nation	Player
1	GK	UKR	Artem Kychak (from (Ukraine) Olimpik Donetsk)
6	MF	SEN	Khaly Thiam (loan return from (Bulgaria) Levski Sofia)
6	MF	HUN	Bálint Vogyicska (loan return from Vasas)
9	MF	HUN	István Bognár (from Mezőkövesd)
20	GK	HUN	Bence Varga (from MTK Budapest II)
27	MF	HUN	Ádám Pintér (from (Germany) Greuther Fürth)
33	DF	UKR	Yevhen Selin (from (Greece) Asteras Tripolis)
88	DF	NGA	George Ikenne (from Budapest Honvéd)
98	GK	HUN	László Horváth (from Balmazújváros)
99	FW	BRA	Myke Ramos (loan return from Haladás)

Out: Note: Flags indicate national team as defined under FIFA eligibility rules; some limited exceptions apply. Players may hold more than one non-FIFA nationality.

No.	Pos.	Nation	Player
1	GK	HUN	Viktor Szentpéteri (to Mezőkövesd)
6	MF	SEN	Khaly Thiam (to (Bulgaria) Levski Sofia)
12	MF	HUN	Dávid Jakab (to Győr)
20	FW	HUN	Ádám Hrepka (to Vasas)
21	MF	HUN	Gábor Bori (to Monor)
23	DF	HUN	Attila Talabér (loan to Vasas)
30	MF	HUN	Bálint Borbély (to Vasas)
34	GK	HUN	Tamás Fadgyas (to Nyíregyháza)
67	MF	HUN	Bence Bayer (loan to Monor)
99	GK	HUN	Balázs Bese (loan to Vasas)
99	FW	BRA	Myke Ramos (loan to (United Arab Emirates) Al-Ittihad)

=== Paks ===
In: Note: Flags indicate national team as defined under FIFA eligibility rules; some limited exceptions apply. Players may hold more than one non-FIFA nationality.

No.	Pos.	Nation	Player
1	GK	HUN	Gergely Nagy (from Vasas)
12	MF	HUN	Richárd Nagy (from Paks II)
14	MF	HUN	Dávid Bor (loan return from Sopron)
15	FW	HUN	Péter Horváth (from Sopron)
16	MF	HUN	Mohamed Remili (from Vasas)
17	MF	HUN	Tamás Egerszegi (from Vasas)
18	MF	HUN	Dominik Molnár (from MOL Vidi II)
19	MF	HUN	Barna Kesztyűs (loan return from Nyíregyháza)
22	MF	HUN	Áron Fejős (loan return from Szeged)
25	DF	HUN	Máté Berdó (from Paks II)
27	MF	HUN	Róbert Kővári (loan return from Sopron)
32	DF	HUN	Dávid Kelemen (from Nyíregyháza)
40	DF	HUN	András Szalai (loan return from Dorog)
88	GK	HUN	Vilmos Borsos (from MOL Vidi II)
94	FW	HUN	Bence Daru (loan return from Győr)
98	FW	HUN	Richárd Jelena (loan return from Zalaegerszeg)

Out: Note: Flags indicate national team as defined under FIFA eligibility rules; some limited exceptions apply. Players may hold more than one non-FIFA nationality.

No.	Pos.	Nation	Player
1	GK	SVK	Péter Molnár (to Siófok)
11	FW	HUN	Márk Simon (to Csákvár)
14	MF	HUN	Dávid Bor (loan to Soroksár)
17	MF	HUN	Dénes Szakály (to Mezőkövesd)
19	MF	HUN	Barna Kesztyűs (loan to Budaörs)
20	MF	HUN	Péter Zachán (loan to Dorog)
22	MF	HUN	Áron Fejős (loan to Budaörs)
29	MF	HUN	Tamás Koltai (to Győr)
32	DF	HUN	Dávid Kelemen (loan to Vasas)
38	DF	HUN	Ádám Hajdú (loan to Vasas)
40	DF	HUN	András Szalai (loan to Balmazújváros)
87	GK	HUN	István Verpecz (loan to Balmazújváros)
94	FW	HUN	Bence Daru (loan to Nyíregyháza)
98	FW	HUN	Richárd Jelena (loan to Mosonmagyaróvár)

=== Puskás Akadémia ===
In: Note: Flags indicate national team as defined under FIFA eligibility rules; some limited exceptions apply. Players may hold more than one non-FIFA nationality.

No.	Pos.	Nation	Player
5	MF	CRO	Benedik Mioc (loan from (Croatia) Osijek)
7	FW	GEO	Bachana Arabuli (from Balmazújváros)
9	FW	ECU	Bryan de Jesús (loan from (Ecuador) El Nacional)
11	MF	SVK	Jan Vlasko (from (Slovakia) Spartak Trnava)
21	FW	HUN	Tamás Kiss (from Szombathely)
22	DF	HUN	Roland Szolnoki (from MOL Vidi)
25	MF	SVK	Jozef Urblik (from (Czech Republic) Vysočina Jihlava)
33	MF	HUN	József Varga (from MOL Vidi)
45	FW	NGA	Ezekiel Henty (from MOL Vidi)

Out: Note: Flags indicate national team as defined under FIFA eligibility rules; some limited exceptions apply. Players may hold more than one non-FIFA nationality.

No.	Pos.	Nation	Player
4	DF	HUN	Zsolt Tar (to Győr)
7	FW	HUN	Márk Szécsi (loan to Debrecen)
8	MF	HUN	Dávid Márkvárt (to Diósgyőr)
11	MF	HUN	Dániel Prosser (loan to (Romania) Sepsi)
13	DF	HUN	Ádám Csilus (loan to Csákvár)
15	MF	CMR	Patrick Mevoungou (to Mezőkövesd)
21	DF	SVN	Denis Klinar (to (Slovenia) Maribor)
28	MF	CRO	Stipe Bačelić-Grgić (to (Croatia) Slaven Belupo)
33	FW	HUN	Gábor Molnár (loan to Mezőkövesd)
45	FW	NGA	Ezekiel Henty (loan to (Croatia) Osijek)
77	FW	CRO	Antonio Perošević (loan to (United Arab Emirates) Al-Ittihad)
80	MF	HUN	Márk Madarász (loan to Zalaegerszeg)

=== Szombathelyi Haladás ===
In: Note: Flags indicate national team as defined under FIFA eligibility rules; some limited exceptions apply. Players may hold more than one non-FIFA nationality.

No.	Pos.	Nation	Player
—	GK	HUN	Ágoston Kiss (from Illés Akadémia)
—	DF	HUN	Gergő Bolla (from Illés Akadémia)
—	DF	HUN	Tamás László (from Balmazújvárosi FC)
—	DF	UKR	Yuriy Habovda (from Balmazújvárosi FC)
—	DF	CZE	Vít Beneš (loan from Vasas SC)
—	DF	HUN	Dávid Tóth (return loan from Soproni VSE)
—	DF	HUN	Zsolt Angyal (return loan from Soproni VSE)
—	MF	HUN	Kristóf Tóth-Gábor (from Illés Akadémia)
—	MF	HUN	Soma Szellák (return loan from Dorogi FC)
—	MF	HUN	Máté Kovalovszki (from Illés Akadémia)
—	MF	DEN	Emil Lyng (from (Scotland) Dundee United)
—	MF	HUN	Martin Tóth (return loan from Soproni VSE)
—	MF	HUN	Dániel Szőke (return loan from Soproni VSE)
—	MF	GEO	Murtaz Daushvili (from (Georgia (country)) FC Samtredia)
—	MF	GER	Reagy Ofosu (from (Slovakia) FC Spartak Trnava)
—	FW	HUN	Tamás Priskin (loan from Ferencvárosi TC)
—	FW	HUN	Bálint Gaál (from Vasas SC)

Out: Note: Flags indicate national team as defined under FIFA eligibility rules; some limited exceptions apply. Players may hold more than one non-FIFA nationality.

No.	Pos.	Nation	Player
—	GK	HUN	Gergely Lévay (to (Austria) SV Stegersbach)
—	DF	HUN	Kristóf Polgár (to Diósgyőr)
—	DF	BEL	Stef Wils (to (Belgium) K. Lyra T.S.V.)
—	DF	HUN	Dávid Tóth (loan to Győri ETO FC)
—	DF	HUN	Zsolt Angyal (to (Austria) SC Lockenhaus)
—	MF	HUN	Dániel Szőke (loan to Nagykanizsa FC)
—	MF	HUN	Máté Tóth (loan to Mezőkövesd-Zsóry SE)
—	MF	HUN	Martin Tóth (loan to BFC Siófok)
—	MF	HUN	Bence Kiss (loan to Kazincbarcikai SC)
—	MF	HUN	Soma Szellák (to Pécsi MFC)
—	FW	BRA	Myke Ramos (loan return to MTK Budapest)
—	FW	AUS	David Williams (to (New Zealand) Wellington Phoenix)
—	FW	HUN	Tamás Kiss (to Puskás Akadémia FC)
—	FW	HUN	Zoltán Medgyes (loan to BFC Siófok)

=== Újpest ===
In: Note: Flags indicate national team as defined under FIFA eligibility rules; some limited exceptions apply. Players may hold more than one non-FIFA nationality.

No.	Pos.	Nation	Player
4	DF	MKD	Kire Ristevski (from Vasas)
17	DF	ROU	Răzvan Horj (from (Romania) Viitorul Constanța)
20	MF	MLI	Souleymane Diarra (loan return from (France) Lens)
31	FW	COD	Rosy Lubaki (from (Democratic Republic of the Congo) Sanga Balende)
77	FW	GEO	Giorgi Beridze (loan from (Belgium) Gent II)
99	FW	HUN	Dániel Lukács (loan from Budapest Honvéd)
99	FW	MKD	Viktor Angelov (loan return from (North Macedonia) Rabotnički)

Out: Note: Flags indicate national team as defined under FIFA eligibility rules; some limited exceptions apply. Players may hold more than one non-FIFA nationality.

No.	Pos.	Nation	Player
4	DF	HUN	Dávid Kálnoki-Kis (to Budapest Honvéd)
6	MF	HUN	József Windecker (to (Greece) Levadiakos)
9	FW	HUN	Patrik Tischler (loan to Budapest Honvéd)
20	MF	MLI	Souleymane Diarra (to (France) Lens)
27	DF	HUN	Bence Pávkovics (loan to Debrecen)
99	FW	MKD	Viktor Angelov (to (North Macedonia) Shkupi)

=== Vidi ===
In: Note: Flags indicate national team as defined under FIFA eligibility rules; some limited exceptions apply. Players may hold more than one non-FIFA nationality.

No.	Pos.	Nation	Player
13	MF	HUN	Zsombor Berecz (from Vasas)
14	FW	HUN	Zsombor Bévárdi (loan return from Siófok)
15	FW	BIH	Armin Hodžić (from (Croatia) Dinamo Zagreb)
21	FW	NGA	Ezekiel Henty (loan return from Puskás Akadémia)
27	MF	HUN	Ádám Bódi (loan return from Debrecen)
65	DF	HUN	Szilveszter Hangya (from Vasas)
70	MF	HUN	Bence Sós (from Debrecen)
77	MF	BUL	Georgi Milanov (from (Russia) CSKA Moscow)
95	DF	HUN	Márton Lorentz (loan return from Siófok)
—	GK	HUN	Illés Zöldesi (loan return from Kisvárda)

Out: Note: Flags indicate national team as defined under FIFA eligibility rules; some limited exceptions apply. Players may hold more than one non-FIFA nationality.

No.	Pos.	Nation	Player
4	DF	HUN	Patrik Réti (loan to Siófok)
7	FW	SRB	Danko Lazović (Retired)
14	FW	HUN	Zsombor Bévárdi (loan to Vasas)
18	MF	HUN	Bence Szabó (loan to Diósgyőr)
21	FW	NGA	Ezekiel Henty (to Puskás Akadémia)
27	MF	HUN	Ádám Bódi (to Debrecen)
30	DF	HUN	Roland Szolnoki (to Puskás Akadémia)
33	MF	HUN	József Varga (to Puskás Akadémia)
77	DF	HUN	Bendegúz Bolla (loan to Siófok)
95	DF	HUN	Márton Lorentz (to Siófok)
99	MF	BIH	Asmir Suljić (to (Slovenia) Olimpija Ljubljana)
—	GK	HUN	Illés Zöldesi (loan to Zalaegerszeg)

== Nemzeti Bajnokság II ==
=== Balmazújváros ===
In: Note: Flags indicate national team as defined under FIFA eligibility rules; some limited exceptions apply. Players may hold more than one non-FIFA nationality.

No.	Pos.	Nation	Player
2	DF	HUN	György Bora (from Budapest Honvéd II)
3	DF	HUN	Barna Papucsek (from Kisvárda)
6	MF	HUN	Viktor Pongrácz (from Győr)
8	MF	HUN	Balázs Szabó (loan from Diósgyőr)
12	GK	HUN	Daniel Zaha (from (Romania) Unknown)
14	MF	HUN	Zsolt Óvári (loan from Diósgyőr)
16	MF	HUN	Bálint Domokos (from III. Kerület)
18	MF	HUN	Zsolt Patvaros (from Zalaegerszeg)
20	FW	HUN	Krisztián Zádori (from Szeged)
21	FW	HUN	Norbert Farkas (from Siófok)
23	DF	HUN	Mózes Aranyos (from Gyirmót II)
31	GK	HUN	István Verpecz (loan from Paks)
44	MF	HUN	Ákos Bíró (loan from BudapestHonvéd II)
56	MF	HUN	Viktor Peszmeg (from Cegléd)
69	FW	HUN	Csaba Peres (from Cegléd)
70	MF	HUN	István Berki (from Monor)
71	MF	HUN	Ádám Orovecz (loan return from Kazincbarcika)
74	MF	HUN	Patrik Ternován (loan from Diósgyőr)
77	MF	HUN	Richárd Balázs (from Veszprém)
91	DF	HUN	András Szalai (loan from Paks)
99	MF	HUN	Nándor Kóródi (loan from Debrecen)

Out: Note: Flags indicate national team as defined under FIFA eligibility rules; some limited exceptions apply. Players may hold more than one non-FIFA nationality.

No.	Pos.	Nation	Player
2	GK	HUN	Krisztián Pogacsics (to Kaposvár)
4	DF	ROU	Adrian Rus (to Puskás Akadémia)
5	DF	HUN	László Tamás (to Haladás)
6	DF	HUN	Krisztián Póti (to Monor)
7	DF	UKR	Yuriy Habovda (to Haladás)
8	FW	GEO	Bachana Arabuli (to Puskás Akadémia)
10	MF	ROU	Ervin Zsiga (to Kaposvár)
13	MF	HUN	Dávid Sigér (to Ferencváros)
14	FW	HUN	Gergely Rudolf (Retired)
17	MF	HUN	Máté Schmid (to Csepel)
18	MF	HUN	Attila Haris (to Debreceni VSC)
19	MF	SRB	Nemanja Andrić (to Győr)
21	MF	CRO	Ante Batarelo (to (Croatia) Lučko)
25	FW	GEO	Lasha Shindagoridze (to (Georgia (country)) Saburtalo)
26	MF	UKR	Shandor Vayda (to Mezőkövesd)
28	DF	HUN	Tibor Bokros (loan return to Debrecen)
30	MF	HUN	Aladár Virág (to Debreceni EAC)
33	DF	NGA	Eke Uzoma (to Budapest Honvéd)
41	MF	HUN	Ferenc Rácz (to Kisvárda)
56	FW	HUN	Miklós Belényesi (to Tállya)
67	MF	GEO	Irakli Maisuradze (to (Cyprus) Paralimni)
71	MF	HUN	Ádám Orovecz
88	GK	HUN	László Horváth (to MTK Budapest)

=== Békéscsaba ===
In: Note: Flags indicate national team as defined under FIFA eligibility rules; some limited exceptions apply. Players may hold more than one non-FIFA nationality.

No.	Pos.	Nation	Player
1	GK	HUN	Antal Czinanó (from Békéscsaba U-19)
6	MF	HUN	Levente Lustyik (loan from MTK Budapest II)
7	MF	HUN	Szabolcs Mezei (loan from MTK Budapest II)
9	MF	HUN	István Szatmári (loan from MTK Budapest)
15	MF	HUN	Dominik Máris (from Békéscsaba U-19)
23	GK	SVK	Ladislav Rybánsky (from Mezőkövesd)
24	GK	HUN	János Uram (from Békéscsaba U-19)
30	MF	HUN	András Pusztai (from Békéscsaba U-19)
77	FW	HUN	Sinan Sinanovic (from Nyíregyháza)

Out: Note: Flags indicate national team as defined under FIFA eligibility rules; some limited exceptions apply. Players may hold more than one non-FIFA nationality.

No.	Pos.	Nation	Player
1	GK	HUN	Roland Mursits (to Cegléd)
6	FW	HUN	Botond Birtalan (to Vasas)
7	FW	HUN	István Eszlátyi (to Mosonmagyaróvár)
10	MF	HUN	István Nagy (to Dorog)
12	GK	HUN	Gábor Máthé (to Unione)
15	DF	HUN	Zsolt Fehér (to Siófok)
21	DF	HUN	László Kiss (to Debrecen)
28	DF	HUN	András Dlusztus (loan return to Vác)
70	MF	HUN	Bence Gyurján (to Nyíregyháza)
97	MF	ROU	Szilárd Kálmán (to Pécs)

== See also ==
- 2018–19 Nemzeti Bajnokság I
