= 2017–18 Diósgyőri VTK season =

Diósgyőri VTK
2017–18 season
- Chairman: (Hungary) Tamás Szabó
- Manager: (Hungary) Tamás Bódog (until 23 April 2018) (Spain) Fernando
- NB 1: 10th
- Hungarian Cup: Quarter-final
- Top goalscorer: League: (Hungary) Roland Ugrai (10); All: (Hungary) Roland Ugrai (12)
- Highest home attendance: 12,753 v Mezőkövesd (5 May 2018)
- Lowest home attendance: 1,081 v Vasas (14 October 2017)
Home colours	Away colours	Third colours

The 2017–18 season was Diósgyőri VTK's 52nd competitive season, 7th consecutive season in the OTP Bank Liga and 107th year in existence as a football club.

== Players ==
=== Current squad ===
As of 25 January 2018

Note: Flags indicate national team as defined under FIFA eligibility rules; some limited exceptions apply. Players may hold more than one non-FIFA nationality.

No.	Pos.	Nation	Player
1	GK	HUN	Erik Bukrán
4	DF	HUN	Márk Tamás
5	DF	HUN	Zoltán Lipták (captain)
6	MF	ESP	Diego Vela
7	FW	HUN	Gábor Makrai
8	MF	KOS	Florent Hasani
9	FW	HUN	Patrik Bacsa
10	FW	HUN	Roland Ugrai
14	FW	HUN	Zsolt Óvári
15	MF	HUN	Barnabás Tóth
17	MF	HUN	Miklós Kitl
19	DF	HUN	Tibor Nagy
20	MF	HUN	Attila Busai
21	MF	HUN	Gergő Kocsis (on loan from Dunajská Streda)

No.	Pos.	Nation	Player
22	GK	CRO	Ivan Radoš
23	DF	HUN	Dávid Forgács
25	DF	SRB	Dušan Brković
27	FW	HUN	Ákos Szarka
30	MF	ESP	Nono
33	FW	GRE	Nikolaos Ioannidis
48	DF	SRB	Dejan Karan
50	DF	HUN	Bence Bárdos
71	MF	UKR	Serhiy Shestakov
74	MF	HUN	Patrik Ternován
81	DF	HUN	Patrik Ivánka
87	DF	HUN	Róbert Tucsa
94	DF	HUN	Gábor Eperjesi
99	GK	HUN	Botond Antal

=== Out on loan ===
Note: Flags indicate national team as defined under FIFA eligibility rules; some limited exceptions apply. Players may hold more than one non-FIFA nationality.

No.	Pos.	Nation	Player
11	MF	HUN	Balázs Szabó (at Siófok until 30 June 2018)
24	MF	ROU	István Fülöp (at Sepsi Sfântu Gheorghe until 30 June 2018)
—	FW	HUN	Gábor Boros (at Kazincbarcikai)

=== Transfers ===
==== Summer ====
In: Note: Flags indicate national team as defined under FIFA eligibility rules; some limited exceptions apply. Players may hold more than one non-FIFA nationality.

No.	Pos.	Nation	Player
7	FW	HUN	Gábor Makrai (from Puskás Akadémia)
8	MF	HUN	Bálint Oláh (loan return from Zalaegerszeg)
9	FW	HUN	Patrik Bacsa (loan return from Kisvárda)
14	FW	HUN	Zsolt Óvári (from Puskás Akadémia)
15	MF	HUN	Barnabás Tóth (from Vác)
21	DF	HUN	Gergő Kocsis (loan from (Slovakia) Dunajská Streda)
23	DF	HUN	Dávid Forgács (from (Italy) Ancona)
33	FW	GRE	Nikolaos Ioannidis (from (Greece) Asteras Tripolis)

Out: Note: Flags indicate national team as defined under FIFA eligibility rules; some limited exceptions apply. Players may hold more than one non-FIFA nationality.

No.	Pos.	Nation	Player
2	DF	LVA	Vitālijs Jagodinskis (to (Romania) Politehnica Iași)
15	MF	CMR	Patrick Mevoungou (to Puskás Akadémia)
23	MF	GEO	Murtaz Daushvili (released)
50	FW	CIV	Georges Griffiths (deceased)
68	MF	HUN	Ramon Halmai (to (Austria) Markt Allhau)
86	FW	HUN	Soma Novothny (loan return to (Belgium) Sint-Truidense)

==== Winter ====
In: Note: Flags indicate national team as defined under FIFA eligibility rules; some limited exceptions apply. Players may hold more than one non-FIFA nationality.

No.	Pos.	Nation	Player
8	MF	KOS	Florent Hasani (from (Kosovo) Trepça'89)
25	DF	SRB	Dušan Brković (from (Latvia) Riga)
71	MF	UKR	Serhiy Shestakov (from (Ukraine) Olimpik Donetsk)

Out: Note: Flags indicate national team as defined under FIFA eligibility rules; some limited exceptions apply. Players may hold more than one non-FIFA nationality.

No.	Pos.	Nation	Player
8	MF	HUN	Bálint Oláh (to Mezőkövesd)
17	MF	HUN	Miklós Kitl (to Dorog)
30	MF	ESP	Nono (to (Slovakia) Slovan Bratislava)
33	DF	HUN	Milán Nemes (to Siófok)

== Statistics ==
=== Appearances and goals ===
Last updated on 2 June 2018.

No.	Pos	Nat	Player	Total		OTP Bank Liga		Hungarian Cup	
No.	Pos	Nat	Player	Apps	Goals	Apps	Goals	Apps	Goals
4	DF	(Hungary) HUN	Márk Tamás	31	1	27	1	4	0
5	DF	(Hungary) HUN	Zoltán Lipták	32	1	27	1	5	0
6	MF	(Spain) ESP	Diego Vela	34	6	29	5	5	1
7	FW	(Hungary) HUN	Gábor Makrai	18	3	16	3	2	0
8	MF	(Kosovo) KOS	Florent Hasani	15	0	12	0	3	0
9	FW	(Hungary) HUN	Patrik Bacsa	24	2	19	1	5	1
10	FW	(Hungary) HUN	Roland Ugrai	36	12	31	10	5	2
14	FW	(Hungary) HUN	Zsolt Óvári	28	4	25	4	3	0
15	MF	(Hungary) HUN	Barnabás Tóth	15	1	9	0	6	1
19	DF	(Hungary) HUN	Tibor Nagy	21	0	16	0	5	0
20	MF	(Hungary) HUN	Attila Busai	32	2	29	2	3	0
21	DF	(Hungary) HUN	Gergő Kocsis	30	0	25	0	5	0
22	GK	(Croatia) CRO	Ivan Radoš	11	-15	9	-15	2	0
23	DF	(Hungary) HUN	Dávid Forgács	19	2	14	1	5	1
25	DF	(Serbia) SRB	Dušan Brković	11	3	7	3	4	0
27	FW	(Slovakia) SVK	Ákos Szarka	29	3	23	2	6	1
33	FW	(Greece) GRE	Nikolaos Ioannidis	34	7	30	5	4	2
48	DF	(Serbia) SRB	Dejan Karan	28	2	27	2	1	0
50	DF	(Hungary) HUN	Bence Bárdos	5	1	3	0	2	1
71	MF	(Ukraine) UKR	Serhiy Shestakov	13	0	10	0	3	0
74	MF	(Hungary) HUN	Patrik Ternován	5	0	3	0	2	0
79	FW	(Hungary) HUN	József Varga	2	0	2	0	0	0
94	DF	(Hungary) HUN	Gábor Eperjesi	21	0	17	0	4	0
99	GK	(Hungary) HUN	Botond Antal	29	-42	24	-38	5	-4
Youth players:
11	MF	(Hungary) HUN	Balázs Szabó	1	0	0	0	1	0
81	DF	(Hungary) HUN	Patrik Ivánka	1	0	0	0	1	0
87	DF	(Hungary) HUN	Róbert Tucsa	1	0	0	0	1	0
Players no longer at the club:
8	MF	(Hungary) HUN	Bálint Oláh	7	1	4	0	3	1
17	MF	(Hungary) HUN	Miklós Kitl	3	0	1	0	2	0
30	MF	(Spain) ESP	Nono	18	2	17	2	1	0

=== Top scorers ===
Includes all competitive matches. The list is sorted by shirt number when total goals are equal.

Last updated on 2 June 2018

Position	Nation	Number	Name	OTP Bank Liga	Hungarian Cup	Total
1	(Hungary)	10	Roland Ugrai	10	2	12
2	(Greece)	33	Nikolaos Ioannidis	5	2	7
3	(Spain)	6	Diego Vela	5	1	6
4	(Hungary)	14	Zsolt Óvári	4	0	4
5	(Serbia)	25	Dušan Brković	3	0	3
6	(Hungary)	7	Gábor Makrai	3	0	3
7	(Slovakia)	27	Ákos Szarka	2	1	3
8	(Spain)	30	Nono	2	0	2
9	(Serbia)	48	Dejan Karan	2	0	2
10	(Hungary)	20	Attila Busai	2	0	2
11	(Hungary)	23	Dávid Forgács	1	1	2
12	(Hungary)	9	Patrik Bacsa	1	1	2
13	(Hungary)	4	Márk Tamás	1	0	1
14	(Hungary)	5	Zoltán Lipták	1	0	1
15	(Hungary)	50	Bence Bárdos	0	1	1
16	(Hungary)	15	Barnabás Tóth	0	1	1
17	(Hungary)	8	Bálint Oláh	0	1	1
/	/	/	Own Goals	2	0	2
			TOTALS	44	11	55

=== Disciplinary record ===
Includes all competitive matches. Players with 1 card or more included only.

Last updated on 2 June 2018

Position	Nation	Number	Name	OTP Bank Liga		Hungarian Cup		Total (Hu Total)	
Position	Nation	Number	Name	Booked	Sent off (straight red)	Booked	Sent off (straight red)	Booked	Sent off (straight red)
DF	(Hungary)	4	Márk Tamás	4	1	1	0	5 (4)	1 (1)
DF	(Hungary)	5	Zoltán Lipták	7	2	0	0	7 (7)	2 (2)
MF	(Spain)	6	Diego Vela	7	0	0	0	7 (7)	0 (0)
FW	(Hungary)	7	Gábor Makrai	1	0	0	0	1 (1)	0 (0)
MF	(Hungary)	8	Bálint Oláh	0	0	1	0	1 (0)	0 (0)
MF	(Kosovo)	6	Florent Hasani	1	0	0	0	1 (1)	0 (0)
FW	(Hungary)	9	Patrik Bacsa	0	0	1	0	1 (0)	0 (0)
FW	(Hungary)	10	Roland Ugrai	8	0	2	0	10 (8)	0 (0)
FW	(Hungary)	14	Zsolt Óvári	1	0	0	0	1 (1)	0 (0)
MF	(Hungary)	15	Barnabás Tóth	3	0	2	0	5 (3)	0 (0)
DF	(Hungary)	19	Tibor Nagy	5	0	2	0	7 (5)	0 (0)
MF	(Hungary)	20	Attila Busai	9	0	0	0	9 (9)	0 (0)
DF	(Hungary)	21	Gergő Kocsis	6	0	0	0	6 (6)	0 (0)
GK	(Croatia)	22	Ivan Radoš	1	0	0	0	1 (1)	0 (0)
DF	(Hungary)	23	Dávid Forgács	4	0	0	0	4 (4)	0 (0)
DF	(Serbia)	25	Dušan Brković	0	1	2	0	2 (0)	1 (1)
FW	(Slovakia)	27	Ákos Szarka	6	1	1	0	7 (6)	1 (1)
MF	(Spain)	30	Nono	2	0	0	0	2 (2)	0 (0)
FW	(Greece)	33	Nikolaos Ioannidis	4	0	1	0	5 (4)	0 (0)
DF	(Serbia)	48	Dejan Karan	5	0	0	0	5 (5)	0 (0)
MF	(Ukraine)	71	Serhiy Shestakov	2	0	0	0	2 (2)	0 (0)
DF	(Hungary)	94	Gábor Eperjesi	3	0	0	0	3 (3)	0 (0)
GK	(Hungary)	99	Botond Antal	1	0	0	0	1 (1)	0 (0)
			TOTALS	80	5	13	0	93 (80)	5 (5)

=== Overall ===
Games played	40 (33 OTP Bank Liga and 7 Hungarian Cup)
Games won	16 (10 OTP Bank Liga and 6 Hungarian Cup)
Games drawn	6 (6 OTP Bank Liga and 0 Hungarian Cup)
Games lost	18 (17 OTP Bank Liga and 1 Hungarian Cup)
Goals scored	55
Goals conceded	57
Goal difference	−2
Yellow cards	93
Red cards	5
Worst discipline	(Hungary) Zoltán Lipták (7 (yellow card) , 2 (red card) )
Best result	5–0 (A) v Vasas – OTP Bank Liga – 14-10-2017
Worst result	0–4 (A) v Balmazújváros – OTP Bank Liga – 05-08-2017
Worst result	0–4 (A) v Ferencváros – OTP Bank Liga – 27-05-2018
Most appearances	(Hungary) Roland Ugrai (36 appearances)
Top scorer	(Hungary) Roland Ugrai (12 goals)
Points	51/120 (42.5%)

Last updated: 2 June 2018

== Nemzeti Bajnokság I ==
=== Matches ===
16 July 2017 1	Vasas	0–2	Diósgyőr	Budapest, Pest County
17:00 CEST		Report	Vela 5'; Szarka 73'	Stadium: Szusza Ferenc Stadion; Attendance: 2,514; Referee: (Hungary) Tamás Bognár

22 July 2017 2	Budapest Honvéd	2–2	Diósgyőr	Budapest, Pest County
18:00 CEST	Eppel 61'; Lanzafame 74'	Report	Vela 41' (pen.), 90+5'	Stadium: Bozsik Stadion; Attendance: 2,605; Referee: (Hungary) Péter Solymosi

29 July 2017 3	Szombathelyi Haladás	0–3	Diósgyőr	Sopron, Győr-Moson-Sopron County
18:00 CEST		Report	Tamás 60'; Óvári 75'; Busai 87'	Stadium: Káposztás utcai Stadion; Attendance: 1,544; Referee: (Hungary) Ádám Farkas

5 August 2017 4	Balmazújváros	4–0	Diósgyőr	Balmazújváros, Hajdú-Bihar County
18:00 CEST	Haris 40'; Andrić 61'; Rácz 86', 90+2'	Report		Stadium: Városi Sportpálya; Attendance: 2,206; Referee: (Hungary) Csaba Pintér

12 August 2017 5	Diósgyőr	2–2	Puskás Akadémia	Debrecen, Hajdú-Bihar County
18:00 CEST	Makrai 10'; Vela 89'	Report	Heris 4'; Prosser 75'	Stadium: Nagyerdei Stadion; Attendance: 2,514; Referee: (Hungary) Zoltán Iványi

19 August 2017 6	Újpest	1–1	Diósgyőr	Budapest, Pest County
20:30 CEST	Angelov 81'	Report	Makrai 12'	Stadium: Szusza Ferenc Stadion; Attendance: zárt kapuk mögött Referee: (Hungary) István Vad

26 August 2017 7	Diósgyőr	2–1	Mezőkövesd	Debrecen, Hajdú-Bihar County
18:00 CEST	Forgács 73'; Ugrai 90+3' (pen.)	Report	Cseri 57'	Stadium: Nagyerdei Stadion; Attendance: 1,979; Referee: (Hungary) Sándor Andó-Szabó

9 September 2017 8	Debrecen	3–1	Diósgyőr	Debrecen, Hajdú-Bihar County
18:00 CEST	Varga 11'; Takács 85'; Tabaković 88'	Report	Óvári 4'	Stadium: Nagyerdei Stadion; Attendance: 5,538; Referee: (Hungary) Balázs Berke

16 September 2017 9	Diósgyőr	2–4	Paks	Debrecen, Hajdú-Bihar County
18:00 CEST	Ugrai 7'; Ioannidis 50'	Report	Bartha 11'; Bertus 40'; Daru 72'; Kulcsár 90+3'	Stadium: Nagyerdei Stadion; Attendance: 1,092; Referee: (Hungary) Péter Solymosi

23 August 2017 10	Ferencváros	2–0	Diósgyőr	Budapest, Pest County
18:00 CEST	Varga 63'; Spirovski 74'	Report		Stadium: Groupama Arena; Attendance: 9,195; Referee: (Hungary) Zsolt Szabó

30 September 2017 11	Diósgyőr	2–3	Videoton	Debrecen, Hajdú-Bihar County
18:00 CEST	Ugrai 17'; Ioannidis 78'	Report	Henty 71'; Hadžić 54'; Pátkai 85'	Stadium: Nagyerdei Stadion; Attendance: 1,322; Referee: (Hungary) Ádám Farkas

14 October 2017 12	Diósgyőr	5–0	Vasas	Debrecen, Hajdú-Bihar County
15:30 CEST	Nono 14'; Ugrai 48', 58'; Vela 71'; Ioannidis 77'	Report		Stadium: Nagyerdei Stadion; Attendance: 1,081; Referee: (Hungary) Csaba Pintér

21 October 2017 13	Diósgyőr	2–1	Budapest Honvéd	Debrecen, Hajdú-Bihar County
18:00 CEST	Ugrai 20'; Ioannidis 90+4' (pen.)	Report	Holender 37'	Stadium: Nagyerdei Stadion; Attendance: 4,500; Referee: (Hungary) Zsolt Szabó

28 October 2017 14	Szombathelyi Haladás	0–3	Diósgyőr	Sopron, Győr-Moson-Sopron County
15:30 CEST		Report	Lipták 50'; Ugrai 51'; Nono 69'	Stadium: Káposztás utcai Stadion; Attendance: 1,120; Referee: (Hungary) Ferenc Karakó

4 November 2017 15	Diósgyőr	1–2	Balmazújváros	Debrecen, Hajdú-Bihar County
15:30 CET	Karan 33'	Report	Tamás 20'; Arabuli 90+5' (pen.)	Stadium: Nagyerdei Stadion; Attendance: 1,968; Referee: (Hungary) Ádám Farkas

18 November 2017 16	Puskás Akadémia	1–0	Diósgyőr	Felcsút, Fejér County
15:30 CET	Knežević 63'	Report		Stadium: Pancho Arena; Attendance: 1,562; Referee: (Hungary) Sándor Andó-Szabó

25 November 2017 17	Diósgyőr	1–2	Újpest	Debrecen, Hajdú-Bihar County
15:30 CET	Ugrai 29'	Report	Novothny 1', 38'	Stadium: Nagyerdei Stadion; Attendance: 1,412; Referee: (Hungary) Csaba Pintér

2 December 2017 18	Mezőkövesd	0–0	Diósgyőr	Mezőkövesd, Borsod-Abaúj-Zemplén County
15:30 CET		Report		Stadium: Mezőkövesdi Városi Stadion; Attendance: 3,254; Referee: (Hungary) Zsolt Szabó

9 December 2017 19	Diósgyőr	3–2	Debrecen	Mezőkövesd, Borsod-Abaúj-Zemplén County
16:00 CET	Ugrai 12'; Karan 17'; Busai 77'	Report	Takács 36'; Tőzsér 82' (pen.)	Stadium: Városi Stadion; Attendance: 1,655; Referee: (Hungary) Tamás Bognár

24 February 2018 20	Paks	2–1	Diósgyőr	Paks, Tolna County
17:00 CET	Szakály 24'; Haraszti 90'	Report	Szarka 60'	Stadium: Fehérvári úti Stadion; Attendance: 852; Referee: (Hungary) Péter Solymosi

3 March 2018 21	Diósgyőr	2–1	Ferencváros	Debrecen, Hajdú-Bihar County
17:00 CET	Brković 56'; Botka 59' (o.g.)	Report	Böde 9'	Stadium: Nagyerdei Stadion; Attendance: 3,652; Referee: (Hungary) Ádám Farkas

10 March 2018 22	Videoton	4–1	Diósgyőr	Felcsút, Fejér County
19:30 CET	Lazović 21', 26'; S. Šćepović 58'; Nego 90+3'	Report	Óvári 78'	Stadium: Pancho Arena; Attendance: 2,107; Referee: (Hungary) István Vad

17 March 2018 23	Vasas	1–1	Diósgyőr	Budapest, Pest County
17:00 CET	Berecz 72'	Report	Brković 90+4'	Stadium: Szusza Ferenc Stadion; Attendance: 1,200; Referee: (Hungary) Tamás Bognár

31 March 2018 24	Diósgyőr	1–1	Budapest Honvéd	Debrecen, Hajdú-Bihar County
17:00 CEST	Ioannidis 30' (pen.)	Report	Eppel 46'	Stadium: Nagyerdei Stadion; Attendance: 1,723; Referee: (Hungary) József Erdős

7 April 2018 25	Diósgyőr	1–2	Szombathelyi Haladás	Mezőkövesd, Borsod-Abaúj-Zemplén County
17:00 CEST	Ugrai 61'	Report	Mészáros 20'; Kovács 49'	Stadium: Városi Stadion; Attendance: 1,472; Referee: (Hungary) Ferenc Karakó

14 April 2018 26	Balmazújváros	2–1	Diósgyőr	Balmazújváros, Hajdú-Bihar County
17:00 CEST	Rudolf 88' (pen.), 90' (pen.)	Report	Óvári 47'	Stadium: Városi Sportpálya; Attendance: 903; Referee: (Hungary) Sándor Andó-Szabó

21 April 2018 27	Diósgyőr	0–1	Puskás Akadémia	Mezőkövesd, Borsod-Abaúj-Zemplén County
17:00 CEST		Report	Szakály 24'	Stadium: Városi Stadion; Attendance: 1,262; Referee: (Hungary) Tamás Bognár

28 April 2018 28	Újpest	1–0	Diósgyőr	Budapest, Pest County
17:00 CEST	Novothny 18'	Report		Stadium: Szusza Ferenc Stadion; Attendance: 2,862; Referee: (Hungary) Zoltán Iványi

5 May 2018 29	Diósgyőr	0–1	Mezőkövesd	Miskolc, Borsod-Abaúj-Zemplén County
17:00 CEST		Report	Dražić 88'	Stadium: Diósgyőri Stadion; Attendance: 12,753; Referee: (Hungary) József Erdős

12 May 2018 30	Debrecen	2–1	Diósgyőr	Debrecen, Hajdú-Bihar County
17:00 CEST	Tabaković 14', 41'	Report	Bacsa 73'	Stadium: Nagyerdei Stadion; Attendance: 3,383; Referee: (Hungary) Ádám Farkas

19 May 2018 31	Diósgyőr	1–0	Paks	Miskolc, Borsod-Abaúj-Zemplén County
17:00 CEST	Bartha 26' (o.g.)	Report		Stadium: Diósgyőri Stadion; Attendance: 4,036; Referee: (Hungary) Gergely Szőts

27 May 2018 32	Ferencváros	4–0	Diósgyőr	Budapest, Pest County
17:30 CEST	Böde 9'; Paintsil 20', 90+4' (pen.); Hajnal 86'	Report		Stadium: Groupama Arena; Attendance: 12,980; Referee: (Hungary) Balázs Berke

2 June 2018 33	Diósgyőr	2–1	Videoton	Miskolc, Borsod-Abaúj-Zemplén County
19:00 CEST	Brković 66'; Makrai 88'	Report	Šćepović 76'	Stadium: Diósgyőri Stadion; Attendance: 10,143; Referee: (Hungary) Zoltán Iványi

=== League table ===
Pos	Team	Pld	W	D	L	GF	GA	GD	Pts	Qualification or relegation
8	Szombathelyi Haladás	33	11	5	17	35	50	−15	38	
9	Mezőkövesd	33	9	10	14	35	52	−17	37	
10	Diósgyőr	33	10	6	17	44	53	−9	36	
11	Balmazújváros (R)	33	8	12	13	39	46	−7	36	Relegation to the Nemzeti Bajnokság II
12	Vasas (R)	33	9	7	17	38	61	−23	34	Relegation to the Nemzeti Bajnokság II

Source: Hungarian Football Federation (in Hungarian), Soccerway
Rules for classification: 1) Points; 2) Matches won; 3) Goal difference; 4) Goals scored; 5) Head-to-head points; 6) Head-to-head goal difference; 7) Head-to-head away goals scored; 8) Fair play ranking; 9) Drawing of lots.
(R) Relegated

=== Results summary ===
Overall								Home						Away					
Pld	W	D	L	GF	GA	GD	Pts	W	D	L	GF	GA	GD	W	D	L	GF	GA	GD
33	10	6	17	44	53	−9	36	7	2	7	27	24	+3	3	4	10	17	29	−12

Last updated: 2 June 2018.
Source: NB1

=== Results by round ===
Round	1	2	3	4	5	6	7	8	9	10	11	12	13	14	15	16	17	18	19	20	21	22	23	24	25	26	27	28	29	30	31	32	33
Ground	A	A	A	A	H	A	H	A	H	A	H	H	H	A	H	A	H	A	H	A	H	A	A	H	H	A	H	A	H	A	H	A	H
Result	W	D	W	L	D	D	W	L	L	L	L	W	W	W	L	L	L	D	W	L	W	L	D	D	L	L	L	L	L	L	W	L	W
Position	2	3	1	3	3	4	3	4	7	9	9	7	6	5	5	6	6	7	6	7	5	6	7	7	7	8	9	9	10	11	10	12	10

Updated to match(es) played on 2 June 2018. Source: Matches
A = Away; H = Home; W = Win; D = Draw; L = Loss

== Hungarian Cup ==
19 September 2017 Round 6	Veszprém	0–3	Diósgyőr	Veszprém, Veszprém County
15:00 CEST		Report	Szarka 6'; Forgács 10'; Bárdos 89'	Stadium: Egyetemi Stadion; Attendance: 400; Referee: (Hungary) Gergely Kovács

24 October 2017 Round 7	Balassagyarmat	0–1	Diósgyőr	Balassagyarmat, Nógrád County
13:30 CEST		Report	Tóth 55'	Stadium: Kövi Pál Sports Centre; Attendance: 900; Referee: (Hungary) Balázs Böcskei

29 November 2017 Round 8	Soroksár	1–3	Diósgyőr	Budapest, Pest County
12:00 CEST	Pál 37'	Report	Oláh 15'; Ugrai 85' (pen.), 90'	Stadium: Sporttelep Mihály Szamosi; Attendance: 400; Referee: (Hungary) Ádám Németh

20 February 2018 Last 16 (1st leg)	Diósgyőr	2–0	Vác	Mezőkövesd, Borsod-Abaúj-Zemplén County
18:00 CET	Ioannidis 30'; Bacsa 87'	Report		Stadium: Városi Stadion; Attendance: 1,434; Referee: (Hungary) Bence Csonka

28 February 2018 Last 16 (2nd leg)	Vác	0–1 (0–3 agg.)	Diósgyőr	Budapest, Pest County
13:00 CET		Report	Vela 29'	Stadium: Hévízi úti Stadion; Attendance: 270; Referee: (Hungary) Attila Molnár

13 March 2018 Quarter-final (1st leg)	Puskás Akadémia	0–1	Diósgyőr	Felcsút, Fejér County
17:00 CET		Report	Ioannidis 34'	Stadium: Pancho Arena; Attendance: 778; Referee: (Hungary) Gergely Szőts

4 April 2018 Quarter-final (2nd leg)	Diósgyőr	0–3 (1–3 agg.)	Puskás Akadémia	Mezőkövesd, Borsod-Abaúj-Zemplén County
18:00 CEST		Report	Perošević 40'; Knežević 49'; Henty 85'	Stadium: Városi Stadion; Attendance: 1,755; Referee: (Hungary) Ádám Farkas
