= 2017–18 Paksi FC season =

Paks
2017–18 season
- Chairman: János Süli
- Manager: Aurél Csertői
- Nemzeti Bajnokság I: 7th
- Hungarian Cup: Round of 16
Home colours	Away colours

The 2017–18 season was Paksi Football Club's 12th competitive season, 12th consecutive season in the Nemzeti Bajnokság I and 65nd year in existence as a football club.In addition to the domestic league, Paks participated in this season's editions of the Hungarian Cup.

== First team squad ==
Note: Flags indicate national team as defined under FIFA eligibility rules; some limited exceptions apply. Players may hold more than one non-FIFA nationality.

No.	Pos.	Nation	Player
1	GK	SVK	Péter Molnár
5	DF	HUN	Zsolt Gévay (captain)
7	DF	HUN	Tamás Báló
8	MF	HUN	Tamás Kecskés
9	FW	HUN	János Hahn
10	MF	HUN	Zsolt Haraszti
14	DF	HUN	András Fejes
17	MF	HUN	Dénes Szakály
20	DF	HUN	Péter Zachán
21	MF	HUN	Kristóf Papp
22	MF	HUN	Áron Fejős
23	DF	HUN	András Vági

No.	Pos.	Nation	Player
26	MF	HUN	Lajos Bertus
28	MF	HUN	Márk Nikházi
29	FW	HUN	Tamás Koltai
30	DF	HUN	János Szabó
31	GK	HUN	Gergő Rácz
38	MF	HUN	Ádám Hajdú
39	MF	HUN	László Bartha
46	MF	HUN	Ádám Simon
77	DF	HUN	Dávid Kulcsár
87	GK	HUN	István Verpecz
96	DF	HUN	Bence Lenzsér
99	FW	HUN	András Simon

== Transfers ==
=== Summer ===
In: Note: Flags indicate national team as defined under FIFA eligibility rules; some limited exceptions apply. Players may hold more than one non-FIFA nationality.

No.	Pos.	Nation	Player
23	DF	HUN	András Vági (loan return from Mezőkövesd)
25	DF	HUN	Máté Berdó (from MTK Budapest)
27	FW	HUN	Máté Adamcsek (from Ferencváros)
28	MF	HUN	Márk Nikházi (from MTK Budapest)
38	DF	HUN	Ádám Hajdú (from Budapest Honvéd)
46	MF	HUN	Ádám Simon (from Haladás)
87	GK	HUN	István Verpecz (from Debrecen)
94	FW	HUN	Bence Daru (from Zalaegerszeg)
—	FW	HUN	Norbert Kokenszky (from Rákosmente)
—	FW	HUN	Richárd Nagy (loan return from SZEOL)

Out: Note: Flags indicate national team as defined under FIFA eligibility rules; some limited exceptions apply. Players may hold more than one non-FIFA nationality.

No.	Pos.	Nation	Player
—	DF	HUN	Zsolt Laczkó (loan to Budapest Honvéd)
—	FW	HUN	Zsolt Balázs (to Zalaegerszeg)
—	DF	HUN	Dávid Kelemen (to Nyíregyháza)
—	DF	HUN	Gábor Kovács (to Csákvár)
—	GK	HUN	György Székely (to (Germany) Schott Mainz)
—	MF	HUN	Dávid Bor (loan to Sopron)
—	FW	HUN	Richárd Jelena (loan to Csákvár)
—	MF	HUN	Barna Kesztyűs (loan to Nyíregyháza)
—	FW	HUN	Norbert Kokenszky (loan to Sopron)
—	MF	HUN	Róbert Kővári (loan to Sopron)
—	DF	HUN	András Szalai (loan to Dorog)

== Statistics ==
=== Appearances and goals ===
Last updated on 9 December 2017.

No.	Pos	Nat	Player	Total		OTP Bank Liga		Hungarian Cup	
No.	Pos	Nat	Player	Apps	Goals	Apps	Goals	Apps	Goals
1	GK	(Slovakia) SVK	Péter Molnár	9	-10	6	-10	3	0
5	DF	(Hungary) HUN	Zsolt Gévay	19	0	18	0	1	0
8	MF	(Hungary) HUN	Tamás Kecskés	12	0	9	0	3	0
9	FW	(Hungary) HUN	János Hahn	17	1	16	1	1	0
10	MF	(Hungary) HUN	Zsolt Haraszti	10	1	9	0	1	1
11	MF	(Hungary) HUN	Márk Simon	3	1	1	0	2	1
17	MF	(Hungary) HUN	Dénes Szakály	16	4	13	2	3	2
20	DF	(Hungary) HUN	Péter Zachán	9	1	7	0	2	1
21	MF	(Hungary) HUN	Kristóf Papp	20	5	19	4	1	1
22	MF	(Hungary) HUN	Áron Fejős	3	0	2	0	1	0
23	DF	(Hungary) HUN	András Vági	12	0	11	0	1	0
26	MF	(Hungary) HUN	Lajos Bertus	21	3	19	3	2	0
28	MF	(Hungary) HUN	Márk Nikházi	9	1	7	0	2	1
29	FW	(Hungary) HUN	Tamás Koltai	13	0	13	0	0	0
30	DF	(Hungary) HUN	János Szabó	20	4	19	4	1	0
38	MF	(Hungary) HUN	Ádám Hajdú	17	0	16	0	1	0
39	MF	(Hungary) HUN	László Bartha	14	6	13	5	1	1
46	MF	(Hungary) HUN	Ádám Simon	12	2	11	2	1	0
77	DF	(Hungary) HUN	Dávid Kulcsár	19	2	18	2	1	0
87	GK	(Hungary) HUN	István Verpecz	13	-20	13	-20	0	0
94	FW	(Hungary) HUN	Bence Daru	10	2	9	1	1	1
96	DF	(Hungary) HUN	Bence Lenzsér	15	2	14	2	1	0
Youth players:
6	MF	(Hungary) HUN	Dávid Bognár	2	0	0	0	2	0
7	DF	(Hungary) HUN	Tamás Báló	3	0	0	0	3	0
12	FW	(Hungary) HUN	Richárd Nagy	1	2	0	0	1	2
25	DF	(Hungary) HUN	Máté Berdó	2	0	0	0	2	0
27	FW	(Hungary) HUN	Máté Adamcsek	2	0	0	0	2	0
31	GK	(Hungary) HUN	Gergő Rácz	1	0	0	0	1	0

=== Top scorers ===
Includes all competitive matches. The list is sorted by shirt number when total goals are equal.

Last updated on 9 December 2017

Position	Nation	Number	Name	OTP Bank Liga	Hungarian Cup	Total
1	(Hungary)	39	László Bartha	5	1	6
2	(Hungary)	21	Kristóf Papp	4	1	5
3	(Hungary)	30	János Szabó	4	0	4
4	(Hungary)	17	Dénes Szakály	2	2	4
5	(Hungary)	26	Lajos Bertus	3	0	3
6	(Hungary)	77	Dávid Kulcsár	2	0	2
7	(Hungary)	46	Ádám Simon	2	0	2
8	(Hungary)	96	Bence Lenzsér	2	0	2
9	(Hungary)	94	Bence Daru	1	1	2
10	(Hungary)	12	Richárd Nagy	0	2	2
11	(Hungary)	9	János Hahn	1	0	1
12	(Hungary)	11	Márk Simon	0	1	1
13	(Hungary)	20	Péter Zachán	0	1	1
14	(Hungary)	10	Zsolt Haraszti	0	1	1
15	(Hungary)	28	Márk Nikházi	0	1	1
/	/	/	Own Goals	1	0	1
			TOTALS	27	11	38

=== Disciplinary record ===
Includes all competitive matches. Players with 1 card or more included only.

Last updated on 9 December 2017

Position	Nation	Number	Name	OTP Bank Liga		Hungarian Cup		Total (Hu Total)	
Position	Nation	Number	Name	Booked	Sent off (straight red)	Booked	Sent off (straight red)	Booked	Sent off (straight red)
DF	(Hungary)	5	Zsolt Gévay	5	0	0	0	5 (5)	0 (0)
MF	(Hungary)	8	Tamás Kecskés	0	1	0	0	0 (0)	1 (1)
MF	(Hungary)	17	Dénes Szakály	1	0	0	0	1 (1)	0 (0)
DF	(Hungary)	20	Péter Zachán	1	0	0	0	1 (1)	0 (0)
MF	(Hungary)	21	Kristóf Papp	3	0	0	0	3 (3)	0 (0)
DF	(Hungary)	23	András Vági	2	0	0	0	2 (2)	0 (0)
MF	(Hungary)	28	Márk Nikházi	3	0	1	0	4 (3)	0 (0)
FW	(Hungary)	29	Tamás Koltai	1	0	0	0	1 (1)	0 (0)
DF	(Hungary)	30	János Szabó	2	0	0	0	2 (2)	0 (0)
MF	(Hungary)	38	Ádám Hajdú	2	0	0	0	2 (2)	0 (0)
MF	(Hungary)	39	László Bartha	1	0	0	0	1 (1)	0 (0)
MF	(Hungary)	46	Ádám Simon	7	0	0	0	7 (7)	0 (0)
DF	(Hungary)	77	Dávid Kulcsár	2	0	0	0	2 (2)	0 (0)
GK	(Hungary)	87	István Verpecz	2	0	0	0	2 (2)	0 (0)
FW	(Hungary)	94	Bence Daru	1	0	1	0	2 (1)	0 (0)
DF	(Hungary)	96	Bence Lenzsér	3	1	0	0	3 (3)	1 (1)
			TOTALS	36	2	2	0	38 (36)	2 (2)

=== Overall ===
Games played	22 (19 OTP Bank Liga and 3 Hungarian Cup)
Games won	9 (6 OTP Bank Liga and 3 Hungarian Cup)
Games drawn	6 (6 OTP Bank Liga and 0 Hungarian Cup)
Games lost	7 (7 OTP Bank Liga and 0 Hungarian Cup)
Goals scored	38
Goals conceded	30
Goal difference	+8
Yellow cards	38
Red cards	2
Worst discipline	(Hungary) Ádám Simon (7 (yellow card) , 0 (red card) )
Best result	7–0 (A) v Balatonfüred - Magyar Kupa - 25-10-2017
Worst result	1–4 (H) v Videoton - OTP Bank Liga - 06-09-2017
Most appearances	(Hungary) Lajos Bertus (21 appearances)
Top scorer	(Hungary) László Bartha (6 goals)
Points	33/66 (50.0%)

Last updated: 9 December 2017

== Nemzeti Bajnokság I ==
=== Matches ===
15 July 2017 1	Paks	2 – 2	Újpest	Paks, Tolna County
18:00 CEST	Szakály 16' (pen.); Papp 48'	Report	Pauljević 13'; Windecker 68'	Stadium: Fehérvári úti Stadion; Attendance: 1,330; Referee: (Hungary) Ferenc Karakó

22 July 2017 2	Mezőkövesd	3 – 2	Paks	Mezőkövesd, Borsod-Abaúj-Zemplén County
18:00 CEST	Veselinović 65'; Baracskai 70'; Střeštík 77' (pen.)	Report	Szakály 57'; Lenzsér 59'	Stadium: Városi Stadion; Attendance: 2,356; Referee: (Hungary) Zsolt Szabó

29 July 2017 3	Paks	1 – 1	Debrecen	Paks, Tolna County
18:00 CEST	Bertus 68'	Report	Sós 45'	Stadium: Fehérvári úti Stadion; Attendance: 1,045; Referee: (Hungary) Ádám Németh

5 August 2017 4	Paks	2 – 0	Szombathelyi Haladás	Paks, Tolna County
20:00 CEST	Szabó 57'; Bartha 62'	Report		Stadium: Fehérvári úti Stadion; Attendance: 1,073; Referee: (Hungary) István Vad

12 August 2017 5	Ferencváros	1 – 1	Paks	Budapest, Pest County
18:00 CEST	Varga 41'	Report	Hahn 60'	Stadium: Groupama Arena; Attendance: 5,423; Referee: (Hungary) József Erdős

6 September 2017 6	Paks	1 – 4	Videoton	Paks, Tolna County
19:30 CEST	Bartha 76'	Report	Lazović 35'; Suljić 41'; Szabó 55' (o.g.); Nego 59'	Stadium: Fehérvári úti Stadion; Attendance: 800; Referee: (Hungary) Zoltán Iványi

26 August 2017 7	Vasas	3 – 1	Paks	Budapest, Pest County
18:00 CEST	Manjrekar 22'; Gaál 41'; Hangya 90+7'	Report	Bartha 45'	Stadium: Szusza Ferenc Stadion; Attendance: 1,000; Referee: (Hungary) Tamás Bognár

10 September 2017 8	Paks	2 – 2	Budapest Honvéd	Paks, Tolna County
17:00 CEST	Lovrić 80' (o.g.); Papp 90'	Report	Lanzafame 41' (pen.); Kabangu 90+2'	Stadium: Fehérvári úti Stadion; Attendance: 1,200; Referee: (Hungary) Csaba Pintér

16 September 2017 9	Diósgyőr	2 – 4	Paks	Debrecen, Hajdú-Bihar County
18:00 CEST	Ugrai 7'; Ioannidis 50'	Report	Bartha 11'; Bertus 40'; Daru 72'; Kulcsár 90+3'	Stadium: Nagyerdei Stadion; Attendance: 1,092; Referee: (Hungary) Péter Solymosi

23 September 2017 10	Paks	1 – 0	Balmazújváros	Paks, Tolna County
18:00 CEST	Kulcsár 35'	Report		Stadium: Fehérvári úti Stadion; Attendance: 800; Referee: (Hungary) Ferenc Karakó

30 September 2017 11	Puskás Akadémia	1 – 2	Paks	Felcsút, Fejér County
18:00 CEST	Knežević 79' (pen.)	Report	Á. Simon 63'; Bertus 71'	Stadium: Pancho Arena; Attendance: 823; Referee: (Hungary) Gergely Szőts

14 October 2017 12	Újpest	0 – 0	Paks	Budapest, Pest County
15:30 CEST		Report		Stadium: Szusza Ferenc Stadion; Attendance: 2,047; Referee: (Hungary) Ádám Farkas

21 October 2017 13	Paks	1 – 1	Mezőkövesd	Paks, Tolna County
15:30 CEST	Á. Simon 17'	Report	Koszta 29'	Stadium: Fehérvári úti Stadion; Attendance: 800; Referee: (Hungary) Balázs Berke

28 October 2017 14	Debrecen	3 – 2	Paks	Debrecen, Hajdú-Bihar County
15:30 CEST	Bódi 12', 74'; Tőzsér 55' (pen.)	Report	Papp 10', 61'	Stadium: Nagyerdei Stadion; Attendance: 2,802; Referee: (Hungary) Tamás Bognár

4 November 2017 15	Szombathelyi Haladás	1 – 2	Paks	Sopron, Győr-Moson-Sopron County
15:30 CET	M. Tóth 90+1'	Report	Bartha 82'; Szabó 86'	Stadium: Káposztás utcai Stadion; Attendance: 1,100; Referee: (Hungary) József Erdős

18 November 2017 16	Paks	0 – 2	Ferencváros	Paks, Tolna County
15:30 CET		Report	Paintsil 5'; Moutari 90+3'	Stadium: Fehérvári úti Stadion; Attendance: 1,643; Referee: (Hungary) Balazs Berke

25 November 2017 17	Videoton	2 – 0	Paks	Felcsút, Fejér County
15:30 CET	Lazović 32' (pen.); Nego 84'	Report		Stadium: Pancho Arena; Attendance: 1,521; Referee: (Hungary) Viktor Kassai

2 December 2017 18	Paks	3 – 1	Vasas	Paks, Tolna County
15:30 CET	Szabó 56', 62'; Lenzsér 73'	Report	Pavlov 72'	Stadium: Fehérvári úti Stadion; Attendance: 842; Referee: (Hungary) Péter Solymosi

9 December 2017 19	Budapest Honvéd	1 – 0	Paks	Budapest, Pest County
15:30 CET	Gazdag 61'	Report		Stadium: Bozsik Stadion; Attendance: 1,330; Referee: (Hungary) Balázs Berke

=== League table ===
Pos	Team	Pld	W	D	L	GF	GA	GD	Pts
5	Debrecen	33	12	8	13	53	47	+6	44
6	Puskás Akadémia	33	11	10	12	41	46	−5	43
7	Paks	33	11	9	13	43	48	−5	42
8	Szombathelyi Haladás	33	11	5	17	35	50	−15	38
9	Mezőkövesd	33	9	10	14	35	52	−17	37

Source: Hungarian Football Federation (in Hungarian), Soccerway
Rules for classification: 1) Points; 2) Matches won; 3) Goal difference; 4) Goals scored; 5) Head-to-head points; 6) Head-to-head goal difference; 7) Head-to-head away goals scored; 8) Fair play ranking; 9) Drawing of lots.

=== Results summary ===
Overall								Home						Away					
Pld	W	D	L	GF	GA	GD	Pts	W	D	L	GF	GA	GD	W	D	L	GF	GA	GD
19	6	6	7	27	30	−3	24	3	4	2	13	13	0	3	2	5	14	17	−3

Last updated: 9 December 2017.
Source: NB1

=== Results by round ===
Round	1	2	3	4	5	6	7	8	9	10	11	12	13	14	15	16	17	18	19	20	21	22	23	24	25	26	27	28	29	30
Ground	H	A	H	H	A	H	A	H	A	H	A	A	H	A	A	H	A	H	A											
Result	D	L	D	W	D	L	L	D	W	W	W	D	D	L	W	L	L	W	L											
Position	4	9	9	9	8	9	11	10	8	8	5	6	7	7	6	8	8	6	7											

Updated to match(es) played on 9 December 2017. Source: Matches
A = Away; H = Home; W = Win; D = Draw; L = Loss

== Hungarian Cup ==
20 September 2017 Round 6	Sárvár	0 – 3	Paks	Sárvár, Vas County
15:00 CEST		Report	Daru 32'; M. Simon 67'; Zachán 68'	Stadium: Sárvári Sporttelep; Attendance: 500; Referee: (Hungary) Tamás Móri

25 October 2017 Round 7	Balatonfüred	0 – 7	Paks	Balatonfüred, Veszprém County
13:30 CEST		Report	Szakály 39', 86'; Haraszti 46'; Nagy 48', 57'; Bartha 67'; Nikházi 89'	Stadium: Balatonfüredi Sporttelep; Attendance: 500; Referee: (Hungary) Ákos Gaál

29 November 2017 Round 8	Csákvár	0 – 1	Paks	Csákvár, Fejér County
16:00 CET		Report	Papp 27'	Stadium: Tersztyánszky Ödön Sportközpont; Attendance: 200; Referee: (Hungary) Ádám Radványi
