= Dávid Forgács =

Hungarian footballer

Personal information
- Full name: Dávid Péter Forgács
- Date of birth: 29 September 1995 (age 31)
- Place of birth: Szeged, Hungary
- Height: 1.79 m (5 ft 10 in)
- Position: Left-back

Team information
- Current team: BFC Siófok
- Number: 27

Youth career
- Tisza Volán SC
- –2013: Atalanta

Senior career*
Years	Team	Apps	(Gls)
2013–2016	Atalanta	0	(0)
2015–2016	→ Pisa (loan)	9	(0)
2016–2017	Ancona	24	(0)
2017–2019	Diósgyőr	22	(1)
2020	Nyíregyháza	3	(0)
2020–2021	Paks	0	(0)
2020–2021	→ Szentlőrinc (loan)	15	(0)
2021–2022	Győri ETO	21	(0)
2022–	BFC Siófok	4	(0)

International career
2011	Hungary U17	1	(0)
2013–2015	Hungary U19	5	(0)
2015	Hungary U20	5	(1)
2015–2016	Hungary U21	10	(1)
- * Club domestic league appearances and goals as of 22:25, 30 May 2023 (UTC)

Dávid Forgács (born 29 September 1995) is a Hungarian professional footballer who plays for BFC Siófok.

== Club career ==
On 13 July 2021 Forgács signed a contract with Győri ETO for the term of two years with an optional third year.

== International career ==
He was part of the Hungarian U-19 at the 2014 UEFA European Under-19 Championship and U-20 team at the 2015 FIFA U-20 World Cup.

== Career statistics ==
Appearances and goals by club, season and competition
Club	Season	League			Cup		Europe		Total	
Club	Season	Division	Apps	Goals	Apps	Goals	Apps	Goals	Apps	Goals
Pisa	2015–16	Lega Pro	10	0	1	0	—		11	0
Ancona	2016–17	Lega Pro	24	0	2	1	—		26	1
Diósgyőr
Diósgyőr	2017–18	Nemzeti Bajnokság I	14	1	5	1	—		19	2
Diósgyőr	2018–19	Nemzeti Bajnokság I	8	0	0	0	—		8	0
Diósgyőr	Total		21	1	5	1	0	0	26	2
Career total			56	1	8	2	0	0	64	3

Updated to games played as of 15 September 2018.
