= Zsolt Óvári =

Hungarian footballer

Personal information
- Full name: Zsolt Levente Óvári
- Date of birth: 29 March 1997 (age 29)
- Place of birth: Kazincbarcika, Hungary
- Height: 1.73 m (5 ft 8 in)
- Position: Left winger

Team information
- Current team: Tatabánya
- Number: 14

Youth career
- 2006–2012: Felcsút
- 2012–2013: Videoton
- 2013: Puskás Akadémia II

Senior career*
Years	Team	Apps	(Gls)
2013–2017	Puskás Akadémia	21	(3)
2017–2020	Diósgyőr	25	(4)
2018–2019	→ Balmazújváros (loan)	32	(5)
2020–2021	Pecs	32	(5)
2021–2023	Győri ETO	61	(8)
2023–2025	Szeged	23	(1)
2025–	Tatabánya	5	(0)

International career
2014–2015	Hungary U-18	4	(1)
2017	Hungary U-21	1	(0)
- * Club domestic league appearances and goals as of 25 May 2025

Zsolt Óvári (born 29 March 1997) is a Hungarian professional footballer who plays for Tatabánya.

== Club career ==
On 28 May 2021, Óvári signed a contract with Győri ETO for two years with an option for third.

== Club statistics ==
Appearances and goals by club, season and competition
Club	Season	League			Cup		League Cup		Europe		Total	
Club	Season	Division	Apps	Goals	Apps	Goals	Apps	Goals	Apps	Goals	Apps	Goals
Puskás
Puskás	2013–14	Nemzeti Bajnokság I	1	0	0	0	0	0	0	0	1	0
Puskás	2014–15	Nemzeti Bajnokság I	0	0	0	0	1	0	0	0	1	0
Puskás	2016–17	Nemzeti Bajnokság II	20	3	2	0	0	0	0	0	22	3
Puskás	Total		21	3	2	0	1	0	0	0	24	3
Diósgyőr	2017–18	Nemzeti Bajnokság I	25	4	3	0	—		—		28	4
Balmazújváros	2018–19	Nemzeti Bajnokság II	32	5	0	0	—		—		32	5
Career total			78	12	5	0	1	0	0	0	80	12

Updated to games played as of 19 May 2019.
