= Ákos Szarka =

Slovak footballer

Personal information
- Date of birth: 24 November 1990 (age 35)
- Place of birth: Malé Dvorníky, Czechoslovakia
- Height: 1.93 m (6 ft 4 in)
- Position: Forward

Team information
- Current team: Ajka
- Number: 27

Youth career
- FK Malé Dvorníky
- 2007–2010: Slovan Bratislava

Senior career*
Years	Team	Apps	(Gls)
2010–2013	Slovan Bratislava	32	(0)
2010	→ Petržalka (loan)	29	(7)
2011	→ SFM Senec (loan)	12	(3)
2013–2016	DAC Dunajská Streda	64	(21)
2017–2018	Diósgyőr	36	(3)
2018–2020	Gyirmót	49	(23)
2020	Suwon	3	(0)
2020–2021	Kaposvári Rákóczi	22	(7)
2021–2025	Ajka	107	(23)
2025–	Gyirmót	21	(14)

International career
2011–2012	Slovakia U21	6	(0)
- * Club domestic league appearances and goals as of 10 May 2026

Ákos Szarka (born 24 November 1990) is a Slovak football forward who plays for Hungarian club Gyirmót. Ákos was a former member of the Slovakia national under-21 football team.

== Personal life ==
Szarka hails from the Hungarian minority in Slovakia, and thus qualifies for the Felvidék national football team.

== Club statistics ==
As of match played 26 May 2024

Appearances and goals by club, season and competition
Club	Season	League			Cup		Europe		Total	
Club	Season	Division	Apps	Goals	Apps	Goals	Apps	Goals	Apps	Goals
Petržalka	2009–10	Slovak Superliga	13	0	0	0	—		13	0
Slovan Bratislava	2010–11	Slovak Superliga	6	0	3	0	0	0	9	0
Slovan Bratislava	2011–12	Slovak First Football League	12	0	1	0	1	0	14	0
Slovan Bratislava	2012–13	Slovak First Football League	15	0	4	0	2	0	21	0
Slovan Bratislava	Total		33	0	8	0	3	0	44	0
Dunajská Streda	2013–14	Slovak First Football League	16	4	1	0	—		17	4
Dunajská Streda	2014–15	Slovak First Football League	19	5	5	0	—		24	5
Dunajská Streda	2015–16	Slovak First Football League	20	9	3	1	—		23	10
Dunajská Streda	2016–17	Slovak First Football League	9	3	1	0	—		10	3
Dunajská Streda	Total		64	21	10	1	—		74	22
Diósgyőr	2016–17	NB I	13	1	4	0	—		17	1
Diósgyőr	2017–18	NB I	23	2	6	1	—		29	3
Diósgyőr	Total		36	3	10	1	—		46	4
Gyirmót	2018–19	NB II	31	19	1	0	—		32	19
Gyirmót	2019–20	NB II	18	4	1	0	—		29	4
Gyirmót	Total		49	23	2	0	—		51	23
Suwon FC	2020	K League 2	3	0	1	3	—		4	3
Gyirmót	2020–21	NB I	22	7	3	2	—		25	9
Gyirmót	2021–22	NB II	28	9	1	0	—		29	9
Gyirmót	2022–23	NB II	20	7	0	0	—		20	7
Gyirmót	2023–24	NB II	32	4	2	0	—		34	4
Gyirmót	Total		80	20	3	0	—		83	20
Career Total			300	74	37	7	3	0	342	81
