= Péter Zachán =

Hungarian footballer

Personal information
- Full name: Péter Zachán
- Date of birth: 12 December 1997 (age 28)
- Place of birth: Kistarcsa, Hungary
- Height: 1.88 m (6 ft 2 in)
- Position: Centre back

Team information
- Current team: Mezőkövesd
- Number: 20

Youth career
- 2005–2013: Hatvan
- 2013–2015: Veszprém

Senior career*
Years	Team	Apps	(Gls)
2015–2016	Veszprém	32	(7)
2016–2020	Paks	22	(0)
2018	→ Dorog (loan)	8	(0)
2019–2020	→ Veszprém (loan)	13	(1)
2020	Szekszárdi	2	(0)
2020	Fjölnir	15	(0)
2021	Debreceni EAC	14	(0)
2021–2024	VLS Veszprém	104	(4)
2024–	Mezőkövesd	49	(2)
- * Club domestic league appearances and goals as of 31 May 2026

Péter Zachán (born 12 December 1997) is a Hungarian football player who currently plays for Mezőkövesd.

== Career ==
=== Paks ===
On 5 November 2016, Zachán played his first match for Paks in a 2–1 win against Ferencváros in the Hungarian League.

== Career statistics ==
As of 19 May 2019

Appearances and goals by club, season and competition
Club	Season	League			Cup		Europe		Total	
Club	Season	Division	Apps	Goals	Apps	Goals	Apps	Goals	Apps	Goals
Veszprém	2015–16	Megyei Bajnokság I	32	7	2	0	—		34	7
Paks	2016–17	Nemzeti Bajnokság I	12	0	1	0	—		13	0
Paks	2017–18	Nemzeti Bajnokság I	9	0	4	1	—		13	1
Paks	2018–19	Nemzeti Bajnokság I	1	0	0	0	—		1	0
Paks	Total		22	0	5	1	0	0	27	1
Dorog	2018–19	Nemzeti Bajnokság II	8	0	1	0	—		9	0
Career total			62	7	8	1	0	0	70	8
