= József Varga (footballer, born 1999) =

Hungarian footballer

Personal information
- Full name: József Varga
- Date of birth: 19 March 1999 (age 27)
- Place of birth: Hungary
- Position: Forward

Team information
- Current team: Diósgyőr
- Number: 79

Youth career
- 2014–2015: Nyíregyháza
- 2015–2018: Diósgyőr

Senior career*
Years	Team	Apps	(Gls)
2018–	Diósgyőr	2	(0)
- * Club domestic league appearances and goals as of 19 May 2018

József Varga (born 18 March 1999) is a Hungarian professional footballer who plays for Diósgyőri VTK.

== Career statistics ==
Appearances and goals by club, season and competition
Club	Season	League			Cup		Europe		Total	
Club	Season	Division	Apps	Goals	Apps	Goals	Apps	Goals	Apps	Goals
Diósgyőr	2017–18	Nemzeti Bajnokság I	2	0	0	0	—		2	0
Career total			2	0	0	0	0	0	2	0

Updated to games played as of 19 May 2018.
