= Diego Vela =

Spanish footballer

Personal information
- Full name: Diego Ignacio Vela Vázquez
- Date of birth: 27 November 1991 (age 34)
- Place of birth: A Coruña, Spain
- Height: 1.67 m (5 ft 6 in)
- Position: Winger

Youth career
- CD Calasanz
- 2008–2009: Deportivo La Coruña

Senior career*
Years	Team	Apps	(Gls)
2009–2013	Deportivo B	106	(19)
2013–2016	Racing Ferrol	94	(4)
2016–2018	Diósgyőri	60	(9)
2020–2021	Bergantiños	33	(0)
2021	Racing Vilalbés	12	(2)
2021–2024	Atlético Arteixo	84	(4)
2025	Montañeros	2	(0)
- * Club domestic league appearances and goals

Diego Ignacio Vela Vázquez (born 27 November 1991) is a Spanish former professional footballer who played as a right winger.

== Club career ==
Born in A Coruña, Galicia, Vela joined the youth academy of local Deportivo de La Coruña at the age of 16, making his senior debut with the B team which competed in Tercera División and helping to promotion to Segunda División B in his first year. He signed a contract extension in July 2012, keeping him at the club for another season; primarily a right winger, he spent much of 2012–13 as a right back.

Vela moved to third-tier side Racing de Ferrol on 7 July 2013, after agreeing to a one-year deal as their first signing of the summer. His first official match took place on 25 August, starting in a 1–1 away draw against CD Tropezón. On 5 August 2014, he renewed his contract until June 2016.

In June 2016, after 106 competitive appearances, Vela moved abroad and joined Diósgyőri VTK in the Hungarian Nemzeti Bajnokság I. He first appeared in top-flight football on 23 July of that year, featuring 60 minutes in the 2–1 home win over Újpest FC.

Vela returned to both Spain and his native region in late December 2019, signing for fourth division club Bergantiños FC after a trial period. In summer 2021 he joined Racing Club Villalbés in the same league but, later that year, transferred to amateurs Atlético Arteixo.

== Career statistics ==
As of match played on 27 May 2018

Club	Season	League			Cup		Other		Total	
Club	Season	Division	Apps	Goals	Apps	Goals	Apps	Goals	Apps	Goals
Deportivo B	2009–10	Tercera División	19	6	—		—		19	6
Deportivo B	2010–11	Segunda División B	22	1	—		—		22	1
Deportivo B	2011–12	Tercera División	32	8	—		—		32	8
Deportivo B	2012–13	Tercera División	33	4	—		2 (Note: Appearances in Promotion Play-offs)	0	35	4
Deportivo B	Total		106	19	—		2	0	108	19
Racing Ferrol	2013–14	Segunda División B	31	1	1	0	2	0	34	1
Racing Ferrol	2014–15	Segunda División B	32	1	1	0	4	0	37	1
Racing Ferrol	2015–16	Segunda División B	31	2	2	0	2	0	35	2
Racing Ferrol	Total		94	4	4	0	8	0	106	4
Diósgyőri	2016–17	Nemzeti Bajnokság I	31	4	4	0	—		35	4
Diósgyőri	2017–18	Nemzeti Bajnokság I	29	5	5	1	—		34	6
Diósgyőri	Total		60	9	9	1	—		69	10
Career total			260	32	13	1	10	0	283	33
