= Áron Fejős =

Hungarian footballer (born 1997)

Personal information
- Date of birth: 17 April 1997 (age 29)
- Place of birth: Senta, Yugoslavia
- Height: 1.67 m (5 ft 6 in)
- Position: Midfielder

Team information
- Current team: Csákvár
- Number: 7

Youth career
- 2011–2013: Szeged
- 2013–2014: Kaposvár

Senior career*
Years	Team	Apps	(Gls)
2014–2015	Kaposvár	20	(3)
2015–2016	Dunaújváros	8	(2)
2016–2020	Paks	12	(0)
2018	→ Szeged (loan)	7	(0)
2018–2019	→ Budaörs (loan)	24	(4)
2020–2021	Szekszárd	8	(2)
2022–2024	Csákvár	51	(5)
2024–2025	Pécs	28	(7)
2025–	Csákvár	10	(0)
- * Club domestic league appearances and goals as of 31 May 2026

Áron Fejős (born 17 April 1997) is a Hungarian football player who plays for Csákvár.

== Career ==
=== Paks ===
On 6 August 2016, Fejős played his first match for Paks in a 0-0 drawn against Ferencváros in the Hungarian League.

=== Csákvár ===
On 18 July 2022, Fejős signed with Csákvár.

== Career statistics ==
As of 4 December 2019

Appearances and goals by club, season and competition
Club	Season	League			Cup		Europe		Total	
Club	Season	Division	Apps	Goals	Apps	Goals	Apps	Goals	Apps	Goals
Kaposvár	2014–15	Nemzeti Bajnokság II	20	3	2	0	—		22	3
Dunaújváros	2015–16	Nemzeti Bajnokság II	8	2	1	0	—		9	2
Paks
Paks	2016–17	Nemzeti Bajnokság I	2	0	0	0	—		2	0
Paks	2017–18	Nemzeti Bajnokság I	2	0	1	0	—		3	0
Paks	2019–20	Nemzeti Bajnokság I	8	0	3	0	—		11	0
Paks	Total		12	0	4	0	0	0	16	0
Szeged	2017–18	Nemzeti Bajnokság II	7	0	0	0	—		7	0
Budaörs	2018–19	Nemzeti Bajnokság II	24	4	7	4	—		31	8
Career total			71	9	14	4	0	0	85	13
