= Nikolaos Ioannidis =

German-born Greek footballer (born 1994)

Nikos Ioannidis
Personal information
- Full name: Nikolaos Ioannidis
- Date of birth: April 26, 1994 (age 32)
- Place of birth: Remscheid, Germany
- Height: 1.88 m (6 ft 2 in)
- Position: Striker

Team information
- Current team: Panachaiki
- Number: 9

Youth career
- Pandramaikos
- –2012: Olympiacos

Senior career*
Years	Team	Apps	(Gls)
2012–2016	Olympiacos	0	(0)
2013–2014	→ Hansa Rostock (loan)	30	(6)
2014–2015	→ PEC Zwolle (loan)	4	(0)
2015–2016	→ Borussia Dortmund II (loan)	23	(2)
2016–2017	Asteras Tripolis	36	(6)
2017–2018	Diósgyőr	35	(5)
2018–2019	Marítimo	0	(0)
2019	Doxa Drama	9	(5)
2020–2022	Apollon Smyrnis	70	(11)
2022–2023	Ionikos	13	(0)
2023	Athens Kallithea	13	(0)
2024	Ethnikos Achna	13	(1)
2024	FC Feronikeli 74	15	(2)
2025–2026	Chania	33	(7)
2026–	Panachaiki	0	(0)

International career
2010–2012	Greece U17	6	(0)
2012–2013	Greece U18	3	(0)
2012–2015	Greece U19	13	(4)
2015–2016	Greece U21	11	(7)
- * Club domestic league appearances and goals as of 4 April 2026

Nikolaos Ioannidis (Greek: Νικόλαος Ιωαννίδης; born 26 April 1994) is a Greek professional footballer who plays as a striker for Gamma Ethniki club Panachaiki.

== Career ==
=== Early career ===
Although born in Germany, Nikos Ioannidis moved to Greece at a very early age and made his first football steps in Pandramaikos. Olympiacos initially showed interest and signed the player, who was included in the youth team of Olympiacos.

=== Olympiacos ===
On 18 April 2013, he made his debut for Olympiacos in a 6-2 Greek Cup win against Panthrakikos, coming off the bench to replace Kostas Mitroglou after 69 minutes.

==== Loan to Hansa Rostock ====
In July 2013 Germany's third division club Hansa Rostock has reached an agreement with the Greek football champion Olympiakos on a perpetual strategic partnership and borrowed in the course of the cooperation of the Greek Under-19 national team Nikolaos Ioannidis for a year. "In Greece there are no full-scale substructure in the form of second teams," said Rostock's sporting director Uwe Vester on Monday. "At this point we come into play, because highly talented, young players can so help us on our way and simultaneously collect valuable experience for their own careers."

==== Loan to PEC Zwolle ====
After the departure of Fred Benson and Guyon Fernandez, PEC Zwolle was shy about attacking reinforcements. Eventually the cup holder hires Ioannidis who will plays on loan for the club in the Dutch Eredivisie since the season 2014/2015. His loan was ended on 9 January 2015, after a lack of prospect.

==== Loan to Borussia Dortmund ====
On 15 January 2015, Ioannidis is back in the 3. Liga. The striker, who played last season 30 games for Hansa Rostock (six goals), signed a contract with Borussia Dortmund II. This provides that the 20-year-old Greek until June 2016 on loan from Olympiacos Piraeus. Ioannidis was on loan to PEC Zwolle played only four league games and a game in the Europa League. He is still under contract with Olympiakos until 2019.

=== Asteras Tripolis ===
Asteras Tripolis officially announced the signing of 22-year-old Greek striker Nikos Ioannidis until the summer of 2018, for an undisclosed fee. In his 10th appearance with the club, in a 2–1 home game against Veria, he scored a brace, sealing the victory for his club. On 1 July 2017, Ioannidis had mutually solved his contract with the club.

=== Diósgyőr ===
Diósgyőr officially announced the signing of the Greek striker until the summer of 2020, for an undisclosed fee. On 16 September 2017, he scored his first goal with the club in a 2–4 home loss game against Paksi FC.

=== Marítimo ===
On 2 September 2018, the Portuguese club Marítimo officially announced the signing of the Greek striker until the summer of 2021, for an undisclosed fee.

=== Doxa Drama ===
On 11 September 2019, the Greek Super League 2 club Doxa Drama F.C. officially announced the signing of the Greek striker until the summer of 2020, for an undisclosed fee.

=== Apollon Smyrnis ===
On 2 January 2020, the Greek Super League 2 club Apollon Smyrnis F.C. officially announced the signing of the Greek striker until the summer of 2020, for an undisclosed fee.

=== Athens Kallithea FC ===
On 15 January 2023, Ioannidis left Apollon to join Athens Kallithea FC.

=== Ethnikos Achna ===
On January 8, 2024, Ioannidis signed with the Cypriot First Division club Ethnikos Achna.

=== FC Feronikeli 74 ===
On August 4, 2024, Ioannidis signed with the FC Feronikeli 74.

==== Chania ====
In the summer of 2025 he signed a one-year contract with Chania.

==== Panachaiki ====
In July 2026 he signed a contract with Panachaiki.

== Career statistics ==
As of 20 February 2022

Club	Season	League		Cup		Others		Continental		Total	
Club	Season	Apps	Goals	Apps	Goals	Apps	Goals	Apps	Goals	Apps	Goals
Olympiacos	2012–13	0	0	1	0	0	0	—		1	0
Olympiacos	Total	0	0	1	0	0	0	—		1	0
Hansa Rostock (loan)	2013–14	30	6	—		—		—		30	6
Hansa Rostock (loan)	Total	30	6	—		—		—		30	6
PEC Zwolle (loan)	2014–15	4	0	2	0	1	0	—		8	0
PEC Zwolle (loan)	Total	4	0	2	0	1	0	—		8	0
Borussia Dortmund II (loan)	2014–15	17	1	—		—		—		17	1
Borussia Dortmund II (loan)	2015–16	6	1	—		—		—		6	1
Borussia Dortmund II (loan)	Total	23	2	—		—		—		23	2
Asteras Tripolis	2015–16	10	2	1	0	—		—		11	2
Asteras Tripolis	2016–17	26	4	7	2	—		—		33	6
Asteras Tripolis	Total	36	6	8	2	—		—		44	8
Diósgyőr	2017–18	30	5	4	2	—		—		34	7
Diósgyőr	2018–19	5	0	0	0	—		—		5	0
Diósgyőr	Total	35	5	4	2	—		—		39	7
Marítimo	2018–19	0	0	0	0	2	0	0	0	2	0
Marítimo	Total	0	0	0	0	2	0	0	0	2	0
Doxa Drama	2019–20	9	5	1	0	—		—		10	5
Doxa Drama	Total	9	5	1	0	—		—		10	5
Apollon Smyrnis	2019–20	9	2	2	0	—		—		11	2
Apollon Smyrnis	2020–21	30	4	1	0	—		—		31	4
Apollon Smyrnis	2021–22	22	4	1	0	—		—		23	4
Apollon Smyrnis	Total	61	10	4	0	0	0	0	0	65	10
Career total		198	34	20	4	3	0	0	0	221	38

== Honours ==
Olympiacos

- Greek Cup: 2012–13

PEC Zwolle

- Johan Cruijff Shield: 2014

Individual

- Valeriy Lobanovskyi Memorial Tournament: Top Scorer 2015 (2 goals) with Luka Zahović
