= 2021–22 MTK Budapest FC season =

MTK Budapest
2021–22 season
- Chairman: Tamás Deutsch
- Manager: Giovanni Costantino (until 4 October); Vaszilisz Teodoru (caretaker, from 4 October to 12 November); Gábor Márton (from 12 November to 23 April); Dávid Horváth (caretaker from 23 April)
- Stadium: Hidegkuti Nándor Stadion
- Nemzeti Bajnokság I: 11th (relegated)
- Magyar Kupa: Round of 32
- Top goalscorer: League: Bojan Miovski (8); All: Bojan Miovski (10)
- Highest home attendance: 4,826 vs Ferencváros (19 February 2022); Nemzeti Bajnokság I
- Lowest home attendance: 1,000 vs Fehérvár (11 December 2021); Nemzeti Bajnokság I
- Average home league attendance: 2,166
- Biggest win: 7–0 vs Sényő (A) (18 September 2021); Magyar Kupa
- Biggest defeat: 0–5 vs Kisvárda (A) (27 November 2021); Nemzeti Bajnokság I
Home colours	Away colours
- All statistics correct as of 16 May 2022.

The 2021–22 season was MTK Budapest Football Club's 119th competitive season, 2nd consecutive season in the Nemzeti Bajnokság I and 133rd year in existence as a football club. In addition to the domestic league, MTK Budapest participated in this season's editions of the Magyar Kupa.

== Squad ==
As of match played 22 July 2021

Note: Flags indicate national team as defined under FIFA eligibility rules; some limited exceptions apply. Players may hold more than one non-FIFA nationality.

No.	Pos.	Nation	Player
1	GK	MNE	Milan Mijatović (captain)
2	DF	HUN	Benedek Varju
3	DF	FIN	Nikolai Alho
4	DF	POR	Tiago Ferreira
5	DF	HUN	Zsombor Nagy
6	MF	ALB	Ylber Ramadani
7	MF	ENG	James Weir
8	MF	HUN	Szabolcs Mezei
10	FW	ROU	Gheorghe Grozav
11	FW	MKD	Bojan Miovski
13	FW	HUN	Zalán Vancsa
14	MF	HUN	Mihály Kata
15	MF	HUN	Márk Kosznovszky
16	DF	COL	Sebastián Herrera

No.	Pos.	Nation	Player
17	FW	HUN	Zsolt Haraszti
18	MF	HUN	Bence Kocsis
20	GK	HUN	Dániel Varasdi
21	DF	HUN	Benjamin Balázs
22	DF	CRO	Marko Perković
23	FW	HUN	Márk Kovácsréti
24	MF	SRB	Srđan Dimitrov
25	GK	HUN	Bence Somodi
26	FW	BIH	Andrija Drljo
27	MF	HUN	Martin Palincsár
28	FW	GHA	Clinton Osei
29	DF	HUN	Barnabás Nagy
99	FW	BRA	Myke

== Transfers ==
=== Summer ===
In: Note: Flags indicate national team as defined under FIFA eligibility rules; some limited exceptions apply. Players may hold more than one non-FIFA nationality.

No.	Pos.	Nation	Player
6	MF	ALB	Ylber Ramadani (from (Denmark) Vejle)
7	MF	ENG	James Weir (from (Slovakia) Pohronie)
10	FW	ROU	Gheorghe Grozav (from Diósgyőr)
13	FW	HUN	Zalán Vancsa (from MTK Budapest U-19)
15	MF	HUN	Márk Kosznovszky (from (Italy) Parma U-19)
17	FW	HUN	Zsolt Haraszti (loan from Paks)
18	MF	HUN	Bence Kocsis (from Puskás Akadémia II)
23	FW	HUN	Márk Kovácsréti (from Kisvárda)
27	MF	HUN	Barnabás Biben (loan return from III. Kerület)
29	MF	HUN	Barnabás Nagy (loan return from Szentlőrinc)
—	MF	HUN	Gergely Kapronczai (loan return from Szentlőrinc)
—	FW	HUN	Ákos Zuigéber (loan return from Dorog)
—	MF	HUN	Miklós Szerencsi (loan return from Dorog)
—	GK	HUN	Balázs Bese (loan return from Budafok)
—	FW	HUN	Péter Törőcsik (loan return from Szentlőrinc)
—	MF	HUN	Anton Bidzilya (loan return from Kaposvár)
—	MF	HUN	Máté Kovács (loan return from Kazincbarcika)
—	GK	HUN	Bence Varga (loan return from Szeged)

Out: Note: Flags indicate national team as defined under FIFA eligibility rules; some limited exceptions apply. Players may hold more than one non-FIFA nationality.

No.	Pos.	Nation	Player
6	MF	HUN	Benjámin Cseke (to Mezőkövesd)
11	FW	HUN	Roland Varga (to (United Arab Emirates) Al-Ittihad)
15	DF	HUN	Szabolcs Barna (to Győr)
17	FW	HUN	Dániel Prosser (loan to (Denmark) SönderjyskE)
19	MF	HUN	József Kanta (Retired)
20	DF	NGR	George Ikenne (released)
27	MF	HUN	Barnabás Biben (loan to Szentlőrinc)
28	DF	HUN	Ádám Pintér (Retired)
31	DF	SRB	Filip Antonijević (to (Serbia) Metalac)
77	DF	HUN	Ákos Baki (to Mezőkövesd)
—	MF	HUN	Gergely Kapronczai (to Budaörs)
—	FW	HUN	Ákos Zuigéber (loan to Budafok)
—	MF	HUN	Miklós Szerencsi (loan to Dorog)
—	GK	HUN	Bence Varga (loan to Kecskemét)
—	GK	HUN	Balázs Bese (loan to Budafok)
—	MF	HUN	Anton Bidzilya (loan to Debreceni EAC)
—	FW	HUN	Péter Törőcsik (loan to Szentlőrinc)
—	MF	HUN	Máté Kovács (loan to Szentlőrinc)

=== Winter ===
In: Note: Flags indicate national team as defined under FIFA eligibility rules; some limited exceptions apply. Players may hold more than one non-FIFA nationality.

No.	Pos.	Nation	Player
13	FW	HUN	Zalán Vancsa (loan from (Belgium) Lommel)
—	DF	SVK	Andrej Kadlec (from (Slovakia) Sereď)
—	FW	HUN	Márkó Futács (from (Slovenia) Olimpija Ljubljana)
—	FW	HUN	Zoltán Stieber (from Újpest)
—	MF	HUN	Dénes Szakály (from Siófok)
—	DF	SVK	János Szépe (from Mezőkövesd)
—	MF	MKD	Stefan Spirovski (from (Ukraine) Mariupol)
—	DF	SRB	Slobodan Rajković (from (Serbia) Bačka Topola)
—	DF	SVK	Branislav Sluka (loan from (Slovakia) Žilina)

Out: Note: Flags indicate national team as defined under FIFA eligibility rules; some limited exceptions apply. Players may hold more than one non-FIFA nationality.

No.	Pos.	Nation	Player
3	DF	FIN	Nikolai Alho (to (Greece) Volos)
4	DF	POR	Tiago Ferreira (released)
13	FW	HUN	Zalán Vancsa (to (Belgium) Lommel)
15	MF	HUN	Márk Kosznovszky (loan to Tiszakécske)
17	FW	HUN	Zsolt Haraszti (loan return to Paks)
20	DF	GHA	Godwords Amedome (loan to Nyíregyháza Spartacus)
21	DF	HUN	Benjámin Balázs (to Tiszakécske)
24	MF	SRB	Srđan Dimitrov (released)
26	FW	BIH	Andrija Drljo (loan to Szentlőrinc)
29	DF	HUN	Barnabás Nagy (loan to Szentlőrinc)

== Competitions ==
=== Overview ===
Competition	First match	Last match	Starting round	Final position	Record							
Competition	First match	Last match	Starting round	Final position	Pld	W	D	L	GF	GA	GD	Win %
Nemzeti Bajnokság I	30 July 2021	15 May 2022	Matchday 1	11th	33	9	9	15	28	50	−22	27.27
Magyar Kupa	18 September 2021	27 October 2021	Round of 64	Round of 32	2	1	0	1	8	4	+4	50.00
Total					35	10	9	16	36	54	−18	28.57

Last updated: 16 May 2022
Source: Competitions

=== Nemzeti Bajnokság I ===
==== League table ====
Pos	Team	Pld	W	D	L	GF	GA	GD	Pts	Qualification or relegation
8	Zalaegerszeg	33	10	9	14	44	58	−14	39	
9	Honvéd	33	10	8	15	48	51	−3	38	
10	Mezőkövesd	33	10	8	15	37	49	−12	38	
11	MTK (R)	33	9	9	15	28	50	−22	36	Relegation to the Nemzeti Bajnokság II
12	Gyirmót (R)	33	7	11	15	34	49	−15	32	Relegation to the Nemzeti Bajnokság II

Source: Hungarian Football Federation (in Hungarian), Soccerway
Rules for classification: 1) Points; 2) Matches won; 3) Goal difference; 4) Goals scored; 5) Head-to-head points; 6) Head-to-head goal difference; 7) Head-to-head away goals scored; 8) Fair play ranking; 9) Drawing of lots.
(R) Relegated

==== Results summary ====
Overall								Home						Away					
Pld	W	D	L	GF	GA	GD	Pts	W	D	L	GF	GA	GD	W	D	L	GF	GA	GD
33	9	9	15	28	50	−22	36	5	5	7	12	21	−9	4	4	8	16	29	−13

Last updated: 16 May 2022.
Source: Soccerway

==== Results by round ====
Round	1	2	3	4	5	6	7	8	9	10	11	12	13	14	15	16	17	18	19	20	21	22	23	24	25	26	27	28	29	30	31	32	33
Ground	A	H	A	A	A	A	H	A	H	A	H	H	A	A	H	H	H	A	H	A	H	A	A	H	H	A	H	A	H	A	H	A	H
Result	D	W	L	W	L	L	W	L	L	D	D	L	L	L	W	L	L	D	L	W	D	L	D	W	D	L	D	L	L	W	D	W	W
Position	7	4	7	3	7	9	6	7	9	9	9	11	11	12	9	11	11	12	12	11	12	12	12	12	12	12	12	12	12	11	11	11	11

Updated to match(es) played on 15 May 2022. Source: Matches
A = Away; H = Home; W = Win; D = Draw; L = Loss

==== Matches ====
30 July 2021 1	Gyirmót	1–1	MTK Budapest	Győr
20:30 CEST	Ferreira 27' (o.g.)	Report	Miovski 54'	Stadium: Ménfői úti Stadion; Attendance: 1,200; Referee: Péter Zierkelbach

7 August 2021 2	MTK Budapest	1–0	Budapest Honvéd	Budapest
20:00 CEST	Grozav 19'	Report		Stadium: Hidegkuti Nándor Stadion; Attendance: 2,831; Referee: Ferenc Karakó

13 August 2021 3	MTK Budapest	1–2	Kisvárda	Budapest
20:00 CEST	Grozav 32'	Report	Hey 69'; Mešanović 75'	Stadium: Hidegkuti Nándor Stadion; Attendance: 1,500; Referee: Péter Antal

22 August 2021 4	Újpest	1–2	MTK Budapest	Budapest
18:00 CEST	Tallo 66'	Report	Miovski 72'; Vancsa 90+2'	Stadium: Szusza Ferenc Stadion; Attendance: 1,866; Referee: Tamás Bognár

28 August 2021 5	Fehérvár	2–1	MTK Budapest	Székesfehérvár
20:30 CEST	Kodro 73' (pen.), 79'	Report	Grozav 45'	Stadium: MOL Aréna Sóstó; Attendance: 2,146; Referee: Csaba Pintér

11 September 2021 6	Paks	3–2	MTK Budapest	Paks
17:45 CEST	Ádám 8'; Sajbán 37', 54'	Report	Grozav 70' (pen.); Miovski 75'	Stadium: Fehérvári úti Stadion; Attendance: 1,411; Referee: Balázs Berke

25 September 2021 7	MTK Budapest	1–0	Mezőkövesd	Budapest
14:45 CEST	Miovski 90'	Report		Stadium: Hidegkuti Nándor Stadion; Attendance: 1,537; Referee: Ádám Farkas

3 October 2021 8	Zalaegerszeg	2–0	MTK Budapest	Zalaegerszeg
14:15 CEST	Koszta 11', 85'	Report		Stadium: ZTE Arena; Attendance: 1,057; Referee: Sándor Andó-Szabó

15 October 2021 9	MTK Budapest	0–1	Puskás Akadémia	Budapest
20:00 CEST		Report	Komáromi 69'	Stadium: Hidegkuti Nándor Stadion; Attendance: 1,675; Referee: Ferenc Karakó

24 October 2021 10	Ferencváros	0–0	MTK Budapest	Budapest
18:00 CEST		Report		Stadium: Groupama Arena; Attendance: 6,907; Referee: Péter Solymosi

30 October 2021 11	MTK Budapest	1–1	Debrecen	Budapest
17:00 CEST	Miovski 12'	Report	Ferenczi 65'	Stadium: Hidegkuti Nándor Stadion; Attendance: 2,231; Referee: Mihály Káprály

5 November 2021 12	MTK Budapest	0–3	Gyirmót	Budapest
20:00 CET		Report	Szegi 41'; Simon 59'; Csonka 74'	Stadium: Hidegkuti Nándor Stadion; Attendance: 1,545; Referee: Ádám Pillók

21 November 2021 13	Budapest Honvéd	3–0	MTK Budapest	Bozsik Stadion
19:45 CET	Lukić 48', 90'; D. Nagy 68' (pen.)	Report		Stadium: Budapest; Attendance: 2,156; Referee: Csaba Pintér

27 November 2021 14	Kisvárda	5–0	MTK Budapest	Kisvárda
14:45 CET	Asani 8', 31'; Leoni 51'; Bumba 59'; Mešanović 69'	Report		Stadium: Várkerti Stadion; Attendance: 1,950; Referee: József Erdős

5 December 2021 15	MTK Budapest	2–1	Újpest	Budapest
16:00 CET	Kovácsréti 87'; Miovski 90+7' (pen.)	Report	Croizet 84'	Stadium: Hidegkuti Nándor Stadion; Attendance: 1,977; Referee: Ferenc Karakó

11 December 2021 16	MTK Budapest	0–2	Fehérvár	Budapest
19:30 CET		Report	Kodro 21'; Petryak 90+4'	Stadium: Hidegkuti Nándor Stadion; Attendance: 1,000; Referee: Tamás Bognár

18 December 2021 17	MTK Budapest	1–4	Paks	Budapest
17:00 CET	Miovski 16'	Report	Szabó 32', 53'; Ádám 45', 57'	Stadium: Hidegkuti Nándor Stadion; Attendance: 1,420; Referee: Péter Solymosi

30 January 2022 18	Mezőkövesd	1–1	MTK Budapest	Mezőkövesd
15:15 CET	Babati 9'	Report	Futács 50'	Stadium: Városi Stadion; Attendance: 1,259; Referee: Gergő Bogár

4 February 2022 19	MTK Budapest	0–2	Zalaegerszeg	Budapest
20:00 CET		Report	Špoljarić 35'; Ubochioma 44'	Stadium: Hidegkuti Nándor Stadion; Attendance: 1,671; Referee: Mihály Káprály

12 February 2022 20	Puskás Akadémia	1–2	MTK Budapest	Felcsút
19:30 CET	Skribek 78'	Report	Futács 33'; Ramadani 69'	Stadium: Pancho Aréna; Attendance: 749; Referee: Gergő Bogár

19 February 2022 21	MTK Budapest	0–0	Ferencváros	Budapest
19:30 CET		Report		Stadium: Hidegkuti Nándor Stadion; Attendance: 4,826; Referee: Ferenc Karakó

27 February 2022 22	Debrecen	1–0	MTK Budapest	Debrecen
17:00 CET	Pávkovics 26'	Report		Stadium: Nagyerdei Stadion; Attendance: 2,853; Referee: Balázs Berke

4 March 2022 23	Gyirmót	1–1	MTK Budapest	Győr
20:00 CET	Szegi 42'	Report	Kovácsréti 86'	Stadium: Ménfői úti Stadion; Attendance: 972; Referee: Gergő Bogár

12 March 2022 24	MTK Budapest	1–0	Budapest Honvéd	Budapest
19:30 CET	Grozav 76'	Report		Stadium: Hidegkuti Nándor Stadion; Attendance: 2,918; Referee: Sándor Andó-Szabó

19 March 2022 25	MTK Budapest	0–0	Kisvárda	Budapest
19:45 CET		Report		Stadium: Hidegkuti Nándor Stadion; Attendance: 1,758; Referee: István Vad

3 April 2022 26	Újpest	2–0	MTK Budapest	Budapest
14:30 CET	Katona 33'; Zivzivadze 82'	Report		Stadium: Szusza Ferenc Stadion; Attendance: 3,269; Referee: Sándor Andó-Szabó

10 April 2022 27	MTK Budapest	1–1	Fehérvár	Budapest
17:00 CEST	Mezei 51'	Report	Fiola (red card) 79'; Négo 84'	Stadium: Hidegkuti Nándor Stadion; Attendance: 2,256; Referee: Gergő Bogár

16 April 2022 28	Paks	4–0	MTK Budapest	Paks
17:00 CEST (UTC+2)	Windecker 11', 38'; Szabó 21'; Ádám 90+2'	Report	Kovácsréti (yellow card) 24'; Rajković (yellow card) 85'	Stadium: Fehérvári úti Stadion; Attendance: 1,501; Referee: Csaba Pintér

22 April 2022 29	MTK Budapest	0–4	Mezőkövesd	Budapest
20:00 CEST	Sluka (red card) 82'	Report	Dražić 13'; Pillár 23'; Lukić 71'; Kiš 83'	Stadium: Hidegkuti Nándor Stadion; Attendance: 1,950; Referee: Balázs Berke

1 May 2022 30	Zalaegerszeg	2–3	MTK Budapest	Zalaegerszeg
14:30 CEST	Špoljarić 58'; Zsóri 86'	Report	Futács 14', 55'; Grozav 90'	Stadium: ZTE Arena; Attendance: 1,992; Referee: Ferenc Karakó

4 May 2022 31	MTK Budapest	0–0	Puskás Akadémia	Budapest
17:00 CEST		Report		Stadium: Hidegkuti Nándor Stadion; Attendance: 1,314; Referee: István Vad

7 May 2022 32	Ferencváros	0–3	MTK Budapest	Budapest
19:15 CEST		Report	Futács 60', 90+3'; Miovski 84'	Stadium: Groupama Arena; Attendance: 13,199; Referee: Gergő Bogár

15 May 2022 33	MTK Budapest	3–0	Debrecen	Budapest
16:00 CEST	Rajković 45+2'; Futács 64' (pen.); Ramadani 90+2'	Report	Kusnyír (yellow card) 41' (yellow-red card) 89'	Stadium: Hidegkuti Nándor Stadion; Attendance: 4,422; Referee: Ferenc Karakó

=== Magyar Kupa ===
18 September 2021 Round of 64	Sényő	0–7	MTK Budapest	Sényő
13:00 CEST		Report	Grozav 9'; Miovski 19', 34'; Kovácsréti 42', 47'; Kosznovszky 68'; Vancsa 72'	Stadium: Városi Sporttelep; Attendance: 400; Referee: Norbert Nagy

27 October 2021 Round of 32	Kisvárda	4–1	MTK Budapest	Kisvárda
17:00 CEST	Camaj 17', 33'; Asani 44'; Zličić 53'	Report	Kocsis 62'	Stadium: Várkerti Stadion; Attendance: 1,100; Referee: Márton Rúsz

=== Appearances and goals ===
Last updated on 16 May 2022.

No.	Pos	Nat	Player	Total		Nemzeti Bajnokság I		Magyar Kupa	
No.	Pos	Nat	Player	Apps	Goals	Apps	Goals	Apps	Goals
1	GK	(Montenegro) MNE	Milan Mijatović	30	-43	30	-43	0	-0
2	DF	(Hungary) HUN	Benedek Varju	26	0	25	0	1	0
3	DF	(Serbia) SRB	Slobodan Rajković	11	1	11	1	0	0
4	DF	(North Macedonia) MKD	Stefan Spirovski	9	0	9	0	0	0
5	DF	(Hungary) HUN	Zsombor Nagy	19	0	18	0	1	0
6	MF	(Albania) ALB	Ylber Ramadani	31	2	30	2	1	0
7	MF	(England) ENG	James Weir	16	0	14	0	2	0
8	MF	(Hungary) HUN	Szabolcs Mezei	26	0	25	0	1	0
9	FW	(Brazil) BRA	Myke Ramos	0	0	0	0	0	0
10	FW	(Romania) ROU	Gheorghe Grozav	27	7	26	6	1	1
11	FW	(North Macedonia) MKD	Bojan Miovski	31	10	30	8	1	2
13	FW	(Hungary) HUN	Zalán Vancsa	21	2	19	1	2	1
14	MF	(Hungary) HUN	Mihály Kata	21	0	20	0	1	0
15	DF	(Slovakia) SVK	János Szépe	12	0	12	0	0	0
16	DF	(Colombia) COL	Sebastián Herrera	16	0	15	0	1	0
17	DF	(Slovakia) SVK	Branislav Sluka	13	0	13	0	0	0
18	MF	(Hungary) HUN	Bence Kocsis	13	1	11	0	2	1
21	FW	(Hungary) HUN	Zoltán Stieber	14	0	14	0	0	0
22	DF	(Croatia) CRO	Marko Perković	8	0	7	0	1	0
22	DF	(Slovakia) SVK	Andrej Kadlec	7	0	7	0	0	0
23	FW	(Hungary) HUN	Márk Kovácsréti	25	5	24	3	1	2
24	MF	(Hungary) HUN	Dénes Szakály	7	0	7	0	0	0
25	GK	(Hungary) HUN	Bence Somodi	5	-11	3	-7	2	-4
27	MF	(Hungary) HUN	Martin Palincsár	17	0	16	0	1	0
28	FW	(Ghana) GHA	Clinton Osei	2	0	2	0	0	0
29	FW	(Hungary) HUN	Márkó Futács	15	7	15	7	0	0
30	DF	(Hungary) HUN	Bence Várkonyi	11	0	11	0	0	0
34	MF	(Hungary) HUN	Ádám Miknyóczki	6	0	5	0	1	0
35	MF	(Hungary) HUN	Mátyás Kovács	8	0	8	0	0	0
Youth players:
12	GK	(Hungary) HUN	Adrián Csenterics	0	0	0	-0	0	-0
18	FW	(Hungary) HUN	Benedek Barkóczi	1	0	1	0	0	0
31	MF	(Hungary) HUN	Artúr Horváth	4	0	4	0	0	0
32	DF	(Serbia) SRB	Alex Marković	1	0	0	0	1	0
Out to loan:
15	MF	(Hungary) HUN	Márk Kosznovszky	7	1	6	0	1	1
17	FW	(Hungary) HUN	Dániel Prosser	4	0	4	0	0	0
20	DF	(Ghana) GHA	Godwords Amedome	2	0	0	0	2	0
26	FW	(Bosnia and Herzegovina) BIH	Andrija Drljo	6	0	4	0	2	0
29	DF	(Hungary) HUN	Barnabás Nagy	9	0	7	0	2	0
30	MF	(Hungary) HUN	Máté Kovács	0	0	0	0	0	0
Players no longer at the club:
3	DF	(Finland) FIN	Nikolai Alho	5	0	4	0	1	0
4	DF	(Portugal) POR	Tiago Ferreira	12	0	11	0	1	0
17	FW	(Hungary) HUN	Zsolt Haraszti	6	0	5	0	1	0
21	DF	(Hungary) HUN	Benjamin Balázs	15	0	15	0	0	0
24	MF	(Serbia) SRB	Srđan Dimitrov	16	0	16	0	0	0
77	DF	(Hungary) HUN	Ákos Baki	1	0	1	0	0	0

=== Top scorers ===
Includes all competitive matches. The list is sorted by shirt number when total goals are equal.

Last updated on 16 May 2022

Position	Nation	Number	Name	Nemzeti Bajnokság I	Magyar Kupa	Total
1	(North Macedonia)	11	Bojan Miovski	8	2	10
2	(Hungary)	29	Márkó Futács	7	0	7
2	(Romania)	10	Gheorghe Grozav	6	1	7
4	(Hungary)	23	Márk Kovácsréti	3	2	5
5	(Hungary)	13	Zalán Vancsa	1	1	2
5	(Albania)	6	Ylber Ramadani	2	0	2
7	(Hungary)	18	Bence Kocsis	0	1	1
7	(Hungary)	15	Márk Kosznovszky	0	1	1
7	(Serbia)	3	Slobodan Rajković	1	0	1
/	/	/	Own Goals	0	0	0
			TOTALS	28	8	36

=== Disciplinary record ===
Includes all competitive matches. Players with 1 card or more included only.

Last updated on 16 May 2022

Position	Nation	Number	Name	Nemzeti Bajnokság I		Magyar Kupa		Total (Hu Total)	
Position	Nation	Number	Name	Yellow card	Red card	Yellow card	Red card	Yellow card	Red card
GK	(Montenegro)	1	Milan Mijatović	1	0	0	0	1 (1)	0 (0)
DF	(Hungary)	2	Benedek Varju	6	0	0	0	6 (6)	0 (0)
DF	(Serbia)	3	Slobodan Rajković	3	0	0	0	3 (3)	0 (0)
DF	(Finland)	3	Nikolai Alho	1	0	0	0	1 (1)	0 (0)
DF	(North Macedonia)	4	Stefan Spirovski	2	0	0	0	2 (2)	0 (0)
DF	(Portugal)	4	Tiago Ferreira	1	1	0	0	1 (1)	1 (1)
DF	(Hungary)	5	Zsombor Nagy	1	0	0	0	1 (1)	0 (0)
MF	(Albania)	6	Ylber Ramadani	5	0	0	0	5 (5)	0 (0)
MF	(England)	7	James Weir	5	0	0	0	5 (5)	0 (0)
MF	(Hungary)	8	Szabolcs Mezei	3	0	0	0	3 (3)	0 (0)
FW	(Romania)	10	Gheorghe Grozav	2	0	0	0	2 (2)	0 (0)
FW	(North Macedonia)	11	Bojan Miovski	8	0	0	0	8 (8)	0 (0)
FW	(Hungary)	13	Zalán Vancsa	2	0	0	0	2 (2)	0 (0)
MF	(Hungary)	14	Mihály Kata	5	0	0	0	5 (5)	0 (0)
DF	(Slovakia)	15	János Szépe	1	0	0	0	1 (1)	0 (0)
MF	(Hungary)	15	Márk Kosznovszky	1	0	0	0	1 (1)	0 (0)
DF	(Colombia)	16	Sebastián Herrera	4	0	0	0	4 (4)	0 (0)
DF	(Slovakia)	17	Branislav Sluka	2	1	0	0	2 (2)	1 (1)
MF	(Hungary)	17	Zsolt Haraszti	1	1	0	0	1 (1)	1 (1)
DF	(Ghana)	20	Amedome Godwords	0	0	1	0	1 (0)	0 (0)
FW	(Hungary)	21	Zoltán Stieber	2	0	0	0	2 (2)	0 (0)
MF	(Hungary)	21	Benjamin Balázs	4	0	0	0	4 (4)	0 (0)
DF	(Croatia)	22	Marko Perković	2	1	0	0	2 (2)	1 (1)
FW	(Hungary)	23	Márk Kovácsréti	5	0	0	0	5 (5)	0 (0)
MF	(Hungary)	24	Dénes Szakály	1	0	0	0	1 (1)	0 (0)
DF	(Serbia)	24	Srđan Dimitrov	4	0	0	0	4 (4)	0 (0)
MF	(Hungary)	27	Martin Palincsár	0	1	0	0	0 (0)	1 (1)
FW	(Hungary)	29	Márkó Futács	2	0	0	0	2 (2)	0 (0)
DF	(Hungary)	29	Barnabás Nagy	1	0	1	0	2 (1)	0 (0)
DF	(Hungary)	30	Bence Várkonyi	1	0	0	0	1 (1)	0 (0)
			TOTALS	76	5	2	0	78 (76)	5 (5)

=== Clean sheets ===
Last updated on 16 May 2022

Position	Nation	Number	Name	Nemzeti Bajnokság I	Magyar Kupa	Total
1	(Montenegro)	1	Milan Mijatović	9	0	9
2	(Hungary)	25	Bence Somodi	0	1	1
3	(Hungary)	12	Adrián Csenterics	0	0	0
			TOTALS	9	1	10
