= 2022–23 MTK Budapest FC season =

MTK Budapest
2022–23 season
- Chairman: Tamás Deutsch
- Manager: György Bognár
- Stadium: Hidegkuti Nándor Stadion
- Nemzeti Bajnokság II: 2nd (promoted)
- Magyar Kupa: Round of 16
- Top goalscorer: League: Krisztián Németh (22); All: Krisztián Németh (23)
Home colours	Away colours	Third colours

The 2022–23 season was Magyar Testgyakorlók Köre Budapest Futball Club's 8th competitive season, 1st consecutive season in the Nemzeti Bajnokság II and 134th year in existence as a football club. In addition to the domestic league, MTK Budapest participated in this season's editions of the Magyar Kupa.

== Transfers ==
=== Summer ===
In: Note: Flags indicate national team as defined under FIFA eligibility rules; some limited exceptions apply. Players may hold more than one non-FIFA nationality.

No.	Pos.	Nation	Player
—	DF	HUN	Patrik Poór (from Debrecen)
—	MF	HUN	István Bognár (from Paks)
—	DF	SVK	Sinan Medgyes (from Paks)
—	FW	HUN	Dániel Zsóri (from Fehérvár)
—	GK	HUN	József Balázs (from III. Kerület)
—	FW	HUN	Krisztián Németh (from Debrecen)
—	DF	HUN	Roland Lehoczky (from MTK Budapest II)
—	MF	HUN	Artúr Horváth (from MTK Budapest II)
—	FW	HUN	Benedek Barkóczi (from MTK Budapest II)
—	FW	HUN	Dániel Prosser (loan return from (Denmark) SønderjyskE)
—	DF	HUN	Barnabás Nagy (loan return from Szentlőrinc)
—	MF	HUN	Barnabás Biben (loan return from Szentlőrinc)
—	RW	HUN	Ákos Zuigéber (loan return from Budafok)
—	FW	HUN	Bence Bíró (loan return from Pécs)
—	MF	HUN	Márk Kosznovszky (loan return from Tiszakécske)
—	MF	HUN	Miklós Szerencsi (loan return from Dorog)
—	DF	GHA	Amedome Godwords (loan return from Nyíregyháza)
—	FW	HUN	Péter Törőcsik (loan return from Szentlőrinc)

Out: Note: Flags indicate national team as defined under FIFA eligibility rules; some limited exceptions apply. Players may hold more than one non-FIFA nationality.

No.	Pos.	Nation	Player
—	FW	MKD	Bojan Miovski (to (Scotland) Aberdeen)
—	MF	ALB	Ylber Ramadani (to (Scotland) Aberdeen)
—	GK	MNE	Milan Mijatović (to (Saudi Arabia) Al-Adalah)
—	MF	MKD	Stefan Spirovski (to (Armenia) Pyunik Yerevan)
—	DF	SVK	Andrej Kadlec (to (Poland) Termalica Nieciecza)
—	DF	COL	Sebastián Herrera (to (North Macedonia) Bregalnica Štip)
—	MF	HUN	Dénes Szakály (to Szeged)
—	FW	BRA	Myke Ramos (to Nyíregyháza)
—	GK	HUN	Balázs Bese (to Szentlőrinc)
—	MF	HUN	Miklós Szerencsi (to Dorog)
—	LW	ROU	Gheorghe Grozav (to (Romania) Petrolul Ploiești)
—	FW	HUN	Bence Bíró (to Szeged)
—	GK	HUN	Bence Varga (loan to Kecskemét)
—	MF	HUN	Márk Kosznovszky (loan to Kozármisleny)
—	FW	HUN	Dániel Prosser
—	DF	SRB	Slobodan Rajković
—	MF	ENG	James Weir
—	LW	HUN	Zalán Vancsa (loan return to (Belgium) Lommel)
—	DF	SVK	Branislav Sluka (loan return to (Slovakia) Žilina)

== Competitions ==
=== Overview ===
Competition	First match	Last match	Starting round	Final position	Record							
Competition	First match	Last match	Starting round	Final position	Pld	W	D	L	GF	GA	GD	Win %
Nemzeti Bajnokság II	1 August 2022	21 May 2023	Matchday 1	2nd	38	22	8	8	86	48	+38	57.89
Magyar Kupa	18 September 2022	1 February 2023	Round of 64	Round of 16	3	2	0	1	14	2	+12	66.67
Total					41	24	8	9	100	50	+50	58.54

Source: Competitions

=== Nemzeti Bajnokság II ===
==== League table ====
Pos	Team	Pld	W	D	L	GF	GA	GD	Pts	Promotion or relegation
1	Diósgyőr (C, P)	38	28	3	7	79	36	+43	87	Promotion to Nemzeti Bajnokság I
2	MTK Budapest (P)	38	22	8	8	86	48	+38	74	Promotion to Nemzeti Bajnokság I
3	Ajka	38	20	8	10	54	37	+17	68	
4	Szeged	38	18	10	10	50	38	+12	64	
5	Soroksár	38	16	13	9	57	48	+9	61	

Source: Hungarian Football Federation (in Hungarian), Soccerway
Rules for classification: 1) Points; 2) Matches won; 3) Goal difference; 4) Goals scored; 5) Head-to-head points; 6) Head-to-head goal difference; 7) Fair play ranking; 8) Drawing of lots.
(C) Champions; (P) Promoted

==== Results summary ====
Overall								Home						Away					
Pld	W	D	L	GF	GA	GD	Pts	W	D	L	GF	GA	GD	W	D	L	GF	GA	GD
38	22	8	8	86	48	+38	74	12	4	3	45	23	+22	10	4	5	41	25	+16

Source: Soccerway

==== Results by round ====
Round	1	2	3	4	5	6	7	8	9	10	11	12	13	14	15	16	17	18	19	20	21	22	23	24	25	26	27	28	29	30	31	32	33	34	35	36	37	38
Ground	H	A	H	A	H	A	H	A	H	A	H	A	H	A	H	A	H	A	H	A	H	A	H	A	H	A	H	A	H	A	H	A	H	A	H	A	H	A
Result	W	D	W	W	W	W	W	L	L	L	D	L	D	W	W	W	D	D	W	W	W	W	W	W	W	W	W	D	W	W	L	L	L	L	D	D	W	W
Position	5	3	1	1	1	1	1	1	1	2	3	5	5	5	3	3	3	4	3	3	2	2	2	2	2	2	1	2	2	2	2	2	2	2	2	2	2	2

Source: Matches
A = Away; H = Home; W = Win; D = Draw; L = Loss

==== Matches ====
1 August 2022 1	MTK Budapest	2–1	Szeged	Budapest
20:00 CEST	Futács 61', 67' (pen.)	Report	Temesvári 34'	Stadium: Hidegkuti Nándor Stadion; Attendance: 2,000; Referee: Marcell Derdák

7 August 2022 2	Szentlőrinc	3–3	MTK Budapest	Szentlőrinc
17:30 CEST	E. Németh 12'; Csörgő 78'; Mervó 80'	Report	K. Németh 33'; Zs. Nagy 58'; Stiber 62'	Stadium: Szentlőrinc Sporttelep; Attendance: 1,100; Referee: Attila Molnár

14 August 2022 3	MTK Budapest	5–2	Dorog	Budapest
19:00 CEST	Futács 29', 36' (pen.), 67'; K. Németh 76'; Kovácsréti 85'	Report	Szerencsi 11'; Szedlár 17'; Barna (red card) 79'	Stadium: Hidegkuti Nándor Stadion; Attendance: 800; Referee: Tamás Takács

17 August 2022 4	Békéscsaba	1–4	MTK Budapest	Szentlőrinc
19:00 CEST	Lukács 64' (pen.)	Report	K. Németh 44', 83'; Stiber 52'; Futács 90+2' (pen.)	Stadium: Kórház utcai Stadion; Attendance: 1,850; Referee: Márton Rúsz

21 August 2022 5	MTK Budapest	4–1	Budafok	Budapest
19:00 CEST	Zs. Nagy 26'; M. Kovács 29', 52'; K. Németh 45'	Report	Beke 10'	Stadium: Hidegkuti Nándor Stadion; Attendance: 700; Referee: Ádám Farkas

28 August 2022 6	Mosonmagyaróvár	0–6	MTK Budapest	Mosonmagyaróvár
17:30 CEST		Report	K. Németh 13' (pen.), 19', 29'; M. Kovács 17', 58'; Bognár 35'	Stadium: Wittmann Antal park Attendance: 1,000; Referee: Bence Csonka

4 September 2022 7	MTK Budapest	6–1	Kozármisleny	Budapest
17:00 CEST	Kovácsréti 9'; Bognár 22', 53'; K. Németh 35', 48'; Stieber 68'	Report	Szabó 71'	Stadium: Hidegkuti Nándor Stadion; Attendance: 1,349; Referee: Bence Hanyecz

12 September 2022 8	Diósgyőr	3–0	MTK Budapest	Diósgyőr
20:00 CEST	Biben 44' (o.g.); Könyves 49', 67'	Report		Stadium: DVTK Stadion; Attendance: 5,011; Referee: Sándor Andó-Szabó

2 October 2022 9	MTK Budapest	1–4	Csákvár	Budapest
17:00 CEST	Bognár 57'	Report	Murka 33'; Gazdag 38'; Karacs 46'; Hornyák 69'	Stadium: Hidegkuti Nándor Stadion; Attendance: 600; Referee: Márton Rúsz

5 October 2022 10	Nyíregyháza	2–0	MTK Budapest	Sényő
15:00 CEST	Gresó 29'; Farkas 52'	Report		Stadium: Sényő Sporttelep; Attendance: 300; Referee: Péter Antal

9 October 2022 11	MTK Budapest	1–1	Győr	Budapest
20:15 CEST	M. Kovács 28'	Report	Toma 81'	Stadium: Hidegkuti Nándor Stadion; Attendance: 600; Referee: Ádám Pillók

16 October 2022 12	Haladás	3–2	MTK Budapest	Szombathely
20:00 CEST	Mi. Németh 18'; Csernik 43'; Rácz 48'	Report	Futács 53', 56'	Stadium: Haladás Sportkomplexum; Attendance: 1,268; Referee: Márió Görög

22 October 2022 13	MTK Budapest	1–1	Siófok	Budapest
17:00 CEST	Futács 40' (pen.) (red card) 68'	Report	P. Horváth 80' (pen.)	Stadium: Hidegkuti Nándor Stadion; Attendance: 1,626; Referee: Norbert Nagy

30 October 2022 14	Soroksár	2–6	MTK Budapest	Budapest
13:00 CET	Hudák 6'; Halmai 64'	Report	Zuigéber 17', 69'; K. Németh 32'; Bognár 56'; Zsóri 81' (pen.); M. Kovács 83'	Stadium: Szamosi Mihály Sporttelep; Attendance: 400; Referee: Bence Hanyecz

6 November 2022 15	MTK Budapest	4–1	Tiszakécske	Budapest
15:00 CET	Stieber 25', 53'; Szépe 76'; Lehoczky 90+2'	Report	Zamostny 13'	Stadium: Hidegkuti Nándor Stadion; Attendance: 600; Referee: Tamás Sipos

9 November 2022 16	Ajka	2–3	MTK Budapest	Ajka
16:00 CET	Berzsenyi 13'; N. Kovács 67'	Report	K. Németh 36', 82' (pen.); Szépe 79'	Stadium: Városi Stadion; Attendance: 1,000; Referee: Attila Molnár

13 November 2022 17	MTK Budapest	1–1	Pécs	Budapest
11:30 CET (UTC+1)	Stieber 18'	Report	Hadaró 27'; Szeles (red card) 87'	Stadium: Hidegkuti Nándor Stadion; Attendance: 1,460; Referee: Márton Rúsz

27 November 2022 18	Kazincbarcika	3–3	MTK Budapest	Kazincbarcika
13:00 CET (UTC+1)	Ádám 15', 86'; Pálinkás 38'; Csatári (yellow card) 44'; J. Nagy (yellow card) 78'; Megyeri (yellow card) 90+3'	Report	Zuigéber 40'; K. Németh 53'; Stieber 65'; Zsóri (yellow card) 82'	Stadium: Kolorcity Aréna; Attendance: 650; Referee: Bence Csonka

4 December 2022 19	MTK Budapest	5–2	Gyirmót	Budapest
13:00 CET (UTC+1)	K. Németh 21', 37'; Stieber 29'; Kata (yellow card) 33'; Poór (yellow card) 63'; Zsóri 90+2', 90+4'	Report	Szegi (yellow card) 9'; Polgár 12'; Csörgő 45'	Stadium: Hidegkuti Nándor Stadion; Attendance: 420; Referee: István Vad

11 December 2022 20	Szeged	1–3	MTK Budapest	Szeged
18:00 CET (UTC+1)	Gajdos 35'; Kundrák (yellow card) 44'; Papp (yellow card) 73'	Report	A. Horváth 13'; K. Németh 26'; Szilágyi 33' (o.g.); Szépe (yellow card) 42'; Zuigéber (yellow card) 48'; Somodi (yellow card) 88'	Stadium: Szent Gellért Fórum; Attendance: 1,200; Referee: Ferenc Karakó

29 January 2023 21	MTK Budapest	2–0	Szentlőrinc	Budapest
15:00 CET (UTC+1)	K. Németh (yellow card) 41'; Zuigéber 55'; Bognár 90'	Report	Radošević (yellow card) 12'; Havas (yellow card) 49'	Stadium: Hidegkuti Nándor Stadion; Attendance: 700; Referee: Ádám Farkas

5 February 2023 22	Dorog	0–2	MTK Budapest	Dorog
14:00 CET (UTC+1)	Lénárth (yellow card) 77'	Report	Kata (yellow card) 12', (goal) 26'; Zsóri (yellow card) 78'; Varju (yellow card) 90'	Stadium: Buzánszky Jenő Stadion; Attendance: 450; Referee: Ádám Pillók

13 February 2023 23	MTK Budapest	3–0	Békéscsaba	Budapest
19:00 CET (UTC+1)	Stieber 67'; Zuigéber 78'; K. Németh 87'	Report	Mikló (yellow card) 64'	Stadium: Hidegkuti Nándor Stadion; Attendance: 500; Referee: Marcell Derdák

19 February 2023 24	Budafok	0–1	MTK Budapest	Budapest
14:00 CET (UTC+1)	Adorján (yellow card) 14'	Report	Zuigéber 44'; Kata (yellow card) 68'; Bobál (yellow card) 90+9'	Stadium: Promontor utcai Stadion; Attendance: 500; Referee: Bence Hanyecz

26 February 2023 25	MTK Budapest	1–0	Mosonmagyaróvár	Budapest
15:00 CET (UTC+1)	K. Németh 28'	Report	Vukasović (yellow card) 66'; Simita (yellow card) 79'	Stadium: Hidegkuti Nándor Stadion; Attendance: 600; Referee: Dr Bence Csonka

5 March 2023 26	Kozármisleny	0–3	MTK Budapest	Kozármisleny
14:00 CET (UTC+1)	Kun (yellow card) 79'; Füredi (yellow card) 90+1'	Report	K. Németh 19'; Zuigéber 43'; Zsóri (yellow card) 90+1', (goal) 90+2'; Bobál (yellow card) 90+1'	Stadium: Kozármislenyi Stadion; Attendance: 500; Referee: Attila Molnár

13 March 2023 27	MTK Budapest	4–2	Diósgyőr	Budapest
19:00 CET (UTC+1)	A. Horváth 27'; Bognár 38'; Stieber 59' (pen.); Zuigéber 74', (yellow card) 79'	Report	Jurek 64', 87'; Farkaš (yellow card) 75'; Bokros (yellow card) 82'	Stadium: Hidegkuti Nándor Stadion; Attendance: 3,255; Referee: Dr Bence Csonka

19 March 2023 28	Csákvár	0–0	MTK Budapest	Csákvár
14:00 CET (UTC+1)	Karacs (yellow card) 41'; Zelizi (yellow card) 88'; Vaskó (yellow card) 89'; László (yellow card) 90+4'	Report	Varju (yellow card) 65'; Bognár (yellow card) 75'	Stadium: Tersztyánszky Ödön Sport centre Attendance: 300; Referee: László Lovas

3 April 2023 29	MTK Budapest	2–1	Nyíregyháza	Budapest
20:00 CEST (UTC+2)	Kata (yellow card) 22'; K. Németh 46', 72', (red card) 90'	Report	Baki 6', (yellow card) 80'; Kovácsréti (yellow card) 60'	Stadium: Hidegkuti Nándor Stadion; Attendance: 600; Referee: Péter Zierkelbach

10 April 2023 30	Győr	1–2	MTK Budapest	Győr
20:00 CEST (UTC+2)	Szujó (yellow card) 40'; Be. Kiss (yellow card) 77'; Huszár 90+1'	Report	Bobál (yellow card) 27'; A. Horváth 65'; Kata (yellow card) 68'; M. Kovács 80'; Rácz (yellow card) 90+7'	Stadium: ETO Park; Attendance: 600; Referee: Imre Kovács

13 April 2023 31	MTK Budapest	0–2	Haladás	Budapest
18:00 CEST (UTC+2)	Zuigéber (yellow card) 78'	Report	Bolla 15'; Nyíri (yellow card) 28'; Borvető (yellow card) 41'; Molnár 75'; Mursits (yellow card) 87'	Stadium: Hidegkuti Nándor Stadion; Attendance: 500; Referee: Mihály Káprály

16 April 2023 32	Siófok	2–1	MTK Budapest	Siófok
17:00 CEST (UTC+2)	Vágó (yellow card) 39'; Debreceni 51'; Farkas 55'	Report	Stieber 70'; Bognár (yellow card) 87'; K. Németh (yellow card) 90+3'	Stadium: Révész Street Stadium; Attendance: 350; Referee: Marcell Derdák

24 April 2023 33	MTK Budapest	1–2	Soroksár	Budapest
20:00 CET (UTC+1)	Miknyóczki 1'; Kocsis (red card) 90+1'	Report	Lovrencsics 18', (yellow card) 63'; Halmai 78'; Köböl (yellow card) 85'	Stadium: Hidegkuti Nándor Stadion; Attendance: 500; Referee: Márió Zimmermann

27 April 2023 34	Tiszakécske	1–0	MTK Budapest	Tiszakécske
17:00 CEST (UTC+2)	Biben (yellow card) 57'; Z. Horváth 61'; Szekér (yellow card) 90+2'; Vólent (yellow card) 90+3'	Report	Kata (yellow card) 37'	Stadium: Városi Stadion; Attendance: 350; Referee: Tamás Berényi

30 April 2023 35	MTK Budapest	1–1	Ajka	Budapest
18:00 CET (UTC+1)	Kata 35'; Poór (yellow card) 37'; Kocsis (yellow card) 90+3'	Report	Dragóner 65'; D. Horváth (yellow card) 90+2'	Stadium: Hidegkuti Nándor Stadion; Attendance: 1,374; Referee: Balázs Katona

8 May 2023 36	Pécs	0–0	MTK Budapest	Pécs
19:00 CEST (UTC+2)	Rácz (yellow card) 87'	Report	Vadnai (yellow card) 70'; Palincsár (yellow card) 82'	Stadium: Stadion PMFC; Attendance: 800; Referee: Mihály Káprály

14 May 2023 37	MTK Budapest	1–0	Kazincbarcika	Budapest
17:00 CET (UTC+1)	Zsóri 5' (pen.); Kapronczai (yellow card) 38'; Kata (yellow card) 68'; Thiam (yellow card) 79'	Report	Ádám (yellow card) 5'; Szekszárdi (red card) 45'; Süttő (yellow card) 90+3'	Stadium: Hidegkuti Nándor Stadion; Attendance: 600; Referee: Márió Görög

21 May 2023 38	Gyirmót	1–2	MTK Budapest	Győr
17:00 CEST (UTC+2)	Medgyes 46'	Report	Zsóri 32' (pen.); Barkóczi 41'; Szépe (yellow card) 88'	Stadium: Ménfői úti Stadion; Attendance: 972; Referee: Tamás Sipos

=== Magyar Kupa ===
18 September 2022 Round of 64	XV. Kerület	0–8	MTK Budapest	Budapest
18:00 CEST		Report	Németh 8'; Futács 17', 27'; Szépe 23'; Kovácsréti 48', 84'; Zuigéber 52'; Zsóri 72' (pen.)	Stadium: Budai II. László Stadion; Referee: Tamás Tóth

19 October 2022 Round of 32	Felsőzsolca	0–6	MTK Budapest	Felsőzsolca
13:30 CEST		Report	Zuigéber 28', 78', 83', 87'; Godwords 54'; Szépe 90'	Stadium: Felsőzsolca Sporttelep; Attendance: 600; Referee: József Ducsai

1 February 2023 Round of 16	MTK Budapest	0–2	Mezőkövesd	Budapest
18:00 CET (UTC+1)		Report	Dražić 20'; Lukić 50'	Stadium: Hidegkuti Nándor Stadion; Attendance: 400; Referee: Péter Antal

== Statistics ==
=== Appearances and goals ===
Last updated on 13 November 2022.

No.	Pos	Nat	Player	Total		Nemzeti Bajnokság II		Magyar Kupa	
No.	Pos	Nat	Player	Apps	Goals	Apps	Goals	Apps	Goals
1	GK	(Hungary) HUN	József Balázs	4	-6	3	-6	1	-0
2	DF	(Hungary) HUN	Benedek Varju	12	0	11	0	1	0
3	DF	(Slovakia) SVK	Sinan Medgyes	16	0	16	0	0	0
4	DF	(Slovakia) SVK	János Szépe	19	4	17	2	2	2
5	DF	(Hungary) HUN	Zsombor Nagy	15	2	15	2	0	0
6	MF	(Hungary) HUN	Mihály Kata	18	0	16	0	2	0
7	MF	(Hungary) HUN	Zoltán Stieber	13	6	12	6	1	0
8	MF	(Hungary) HUN	Szabolcs Mezei	9	0	9	0	0	0
9	FW	(Hungary) HUN	Márkó Futács	12	11	11	9	1	2
10	MF	(Hungary) HUN	István Bognár	18	5	17	5	1	0
11	FW	(Hungary) HUN	Krisztián Németh	17	14	16	13	1	1
12	GK	(Hungary) HUN	Bence Somodi	12	-18	12	-18	0	-0
12	GK	(Hungary) HUN	Adrián Csenterics	3	-5	2	-5	1	-0
13	RW	(Hungary) HUN	Ádám Miknyóczki	5	0	4	0	1	0
14	MF	(Hungary) HUN	Artúr Horváth	7	0	6	0	1	0
15	DF	(Hungary) HUN	Roland Lehoczky	18	1	16	1	2	0
16	DF	(Hungary) HUN	Barnabás Nagy	7	0	5	0	2	0
17	MF	(Hungary) HUN	Máté Kovács	9	0	7	0	2	0
18	MF	(Hungary) HUN	Barnabás Biben	7	0	6	0	1	0
20	MF	(Hungary) HUN	Mátyás Kovács	13	6	13	6	0	0
21	DF	(Hungary) HUN	Patrik Poór	8	0	8	0	0	0
21	FW	(Hungary) HUN	Benedek Barkóczi	1	0	1	0	0	0
21	DF	(Hungary) HUN	Gergő Kocsis	4	0	4	0	0	0
22	LW	(Hungary) HUN	Ákos Zuigéber	7	7	5	2	2	5
23	RW	(Hungary) HUN	Márk Kovácsréti	10	4	9	2	1	2
26	DF	(Ghana) GHA	Amedome Godwords	3	1	2	0	1	1
27	MF	(Hungary) HUN	Martin Palincsár	8	0	7	0	1	0
30	DF	(Hungary) HUN	Bence Várkonyi	4	0	2	0	2	0
99	FW	(Hungary) HUN	Dániel Zsóri	12	2	10	1	2	1
Youth players:
23	FW	(Hungary) HUN	Máté Balogh	0	0	0	0	0	0
28	FW	(Hungary) HUN	Levente Juhász	2	0	1	0	1	0
	GK	(Hungary) HUN	Dániel Paulovicz	0	0	0	-0	0	-0
	DF	(Hungary) HUN	Gergely Kapronczai	0	0	0	0	0	0
Out to loan:
Players no longer at the club:

=== Top scorers ===
Includes all competitive matches. The list is sorted by shirt number when total goals are equal.

Last updated on 13 November 2022

Position	Nation	Number	Name	Nemzeti Bajnokság II	Magyar Kupa	Total
1	(Hungary)	11	Krisztián Németh	13	1	14
2	(Hungary)	9	Márkó Futács	9	2	11
3	(Hungary)	22	Ákos Zuigéber	2	5	7
4	(Hungary)	20	Mátyás Kovács	6	0	6
5	(Hungary)	7	Zoltán Stieber	6	0	6
6	(Hungary)	10	István Bognár	5	0	5
7	(Hungary)	23	Márk Kovácsréti	2	2	4
8	(Slovakia)	4	János Szépe	2	2	4
9	(Hungary)	5	Zsombor Nagy	2	0	2
10	(Hungary)	99	Dániel Zsóri	1	1	2
11	(Hungary)	15	Roland Lehoczky	1	0	1
12	(Ghana)	26	Amedome Godwords	0	1	1
/	/	/	Own Goals	0	0	0
			TOTALS	49	14	63

=== Disciplinary record ===
Includes all competitive matches. Players with 1 card or more included only.

Last updated on 13 November 2022

Position	Nation	Number	Name	Nemzeti Bajnokság II		Magyar Kupa		Total (Hu Total)	
Position	Nation	Number	Name	Yellow card	Red card	Yellow card	Red card	Yellow card	Red card
DF	(Hungary)	2	Benedek Varju	2	0	0	0	2 (2)	0 (0)
DF	(Slovakia)	3	Sinan Medgyes	5	0	0	0	5 (5)	0 (0)
DF	(Slovakia)	4	János Szépe	1	0	0	0	1 (1)	0 (0)
DF	(Hungary)	5	Zsombor Nagy	1	0	0	0	1 (1)	0 (0)
MF	(Hungary)	6	Mihály Kata	7	0	0	0	7 (7)	0 (0)
MF	(Hungary)	7	Zoltán Stieber	2	0	0	0	2 (2)	0 (0)
FW	(Hungary)	9	Márkó Futács	3	1	0	0	3 (3)	1 (1)
MF	(Hungary)	10	István Bognár	2	0	0	0	2 (2)	0 (0)
FW	(Hungary)	11	Krisztián Németh	3	0	0	0	3 (3)	0 (0)
GK	(Hungary)	12	Adrián Csenterics	1	0	0	0	1 (1)	0 (0)
DF	(Hungary)	15	Roland Lehoczky	2	0	0	0	2 (2)	0 (0)
MF	(Hungary)	17	Máté Kovács	1	0	0	0	1 (1)	0 (0)
MF	(Hungary)	18	Barnabás Biben	1	0	0	0	1 (1)	0 (0)
MF	(Hungary)	20	Mátyás Kovács	1	0	0	0	1 (1)	0 (0)
DF	(Hungary)	21	Patrik Poór	1	0	0	0	1 (1)	0 (0)
GK	(Hungary)	25	Bence Somodi	1	0	0	0	1 (1)	0 (0)
DF	(Ghana)	26	Amedome Godwords	1	0	0	0	1 (1)	0 (0)
FW	(Hungary)	99	Dániel Zsóri	3	0	1	0	4 (3)	0 (0)
			TOTALS	38	1	1	0	39 (38)	1 (1)

=== Clean sheets ===
Last updated on 13 November 2022

Position	Nation	Number	Name	Nemzeti Bajnokság II	Magyar Kupa	Total
1	(Hungary)	12	Bence Somodi	1	0	1
2	(Hungary)	1	József Balázs	0	1	1
3	(Hungary)	12	Adrián Csenterics	0	1	1
			TOTALS	1	2	3
