= Tiago Ferreira (footballer, born 1993) =

Portuguese footballer (born 1993)

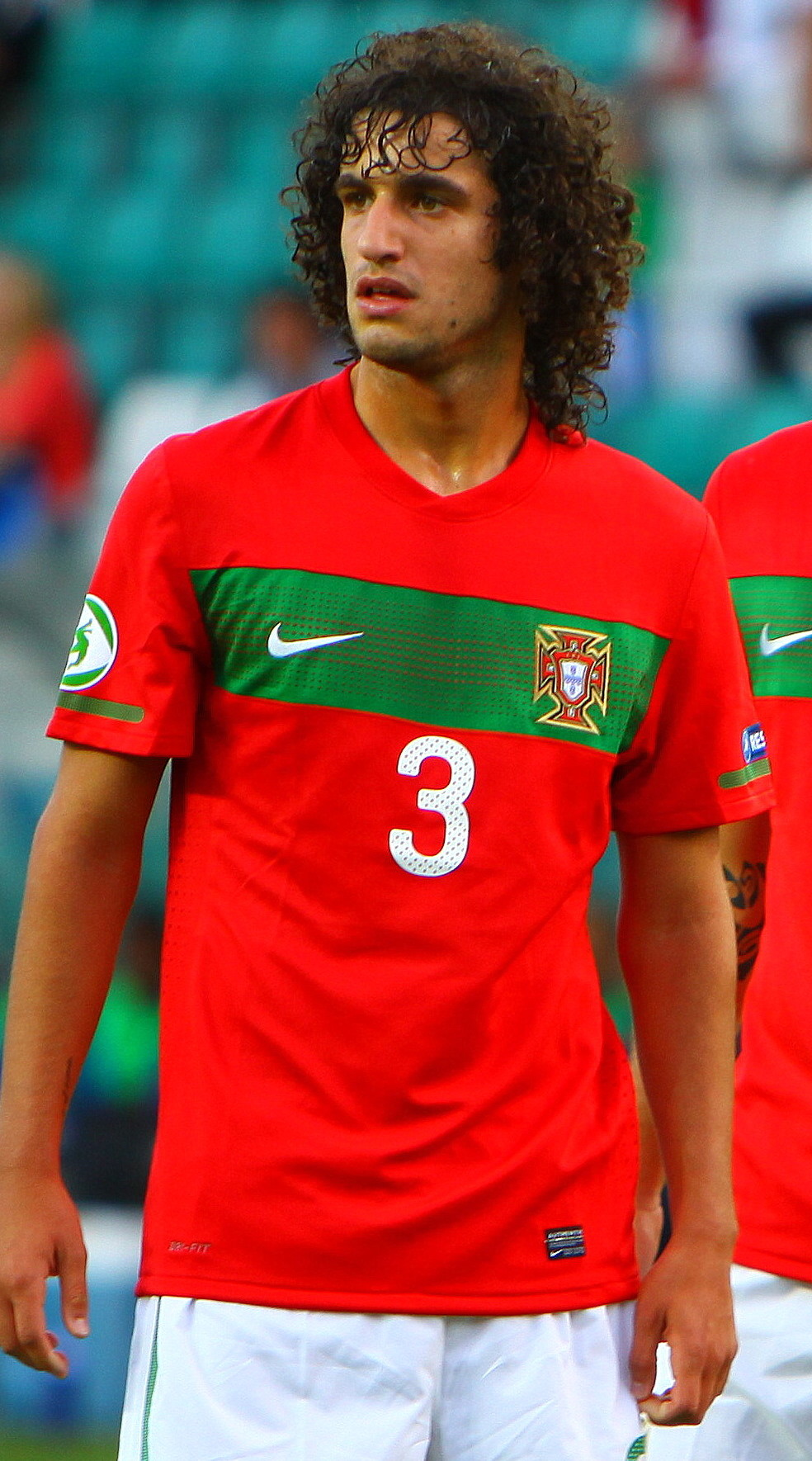
- Ferreira with Portugal U19 in 2012

Personal information
- Full name: Tiago Emanuel Canelas Almeida Ferreira
- Date of birth: 10 July 1993 (age 33)
- Place of birth: Porto, Portugal
- Height: 1.84 m (6 ft 0 in)
- Position: Centre-back

Team information
- Current team: Porto B
- Number: 93

Youth career
- 2001–2002: Infesta
- 2002–2007: Boavista
- 2006–2007: → Pasteleira (loan)
- 2007–2012: Porto
- 2008–2009: → Padroense (loan)

Senior career*
Years	Team	Apps	(Gls)
2012–2014	Porto B	70	(1)
2014–2015	Waregem	2	(0)
2015–2017	União Madeira	32	(1)
2017–2020	Universitatea Craiova	61	(0)
2020–2022	MTK	27	(1)
2022	Tractor	5	(0)
2022	Kukësi	13	(1)
2023	Trofense	18	(0)
2023–2025	União Leiria	41	(1)
2025–2026	Paços Ferreira	31	(0)
2026–	Porto B	2	(0)

International career
2008	Portugal U15	3	(0)
2008–2009	Portugal U16	8	(0)
2009–2010	Portugal U17	16	(0)
2010–2011	Portugal U18	9	(0)
2011–2012	Portugal U19	18	(2)
2011–2013	Portugal U20	28	(2)
2013	Portugal U21	2	(0)
Medal record
Men's football
Representing Portugal
FIFA U-20 World Cup
Runner-up	2011 Colombia
- * Club domestic league appearances and goals as of 22:12, 24 August 2026 (UTC)

Tiago Emanuel Canelas Almeida Ferreira CvIH (born 10 July 1993) is a Portuguese professional footballer who plays as a central defender for Liga Portugal 2 club Porto B.

== Club career ==
=== Porto ===
Born in Porto, Ferreira played youth football with five clubs in the area, finishing his development with FC Porto after joining at the age of 14. He made his professional debut with the reserves that competed in the Segunda Liga, his first appearance in the competition being on 12 August 2012 in a 2–2 away draw against C.D. Tondela.

Ferreira played 35 matches and scored one goal in the 2013–14 season to help his team to a final runner-up position in the second tier, but they were ineligible for promotion. In summer 2014, after failing to appear once in competitive games for the main squad, he was released.

=== Zulte Waregem ===
On 15 July 2014, free agent Ferreira signed a four-year contract with S.V. Zulte Waregem. He made his Belgian Pro League debut on 3 August, playing the full 90 minutes in a 2–1 loss at K.S.C. Lokeren Oost-Vlaanderen.

=== União Madeira ===
Ferreira returned to his country in the 2015 off-season, joining C.F. União on a three-year deal. His maiden appearance in the Primeira Liga took place on 28 November, when he played one minute in a 2–2 away draw against Vitória de Setúbal.

Sparingly played by manager Luís Norton de Matos in his debut campaign, Ferreira also saw his side be relegated. He asked to be released from contract in May 2017 claiming unpaid wages, which led to criticism from club president Filipe Silva.

=== Universitatea Craiova ===
On 21 July 2017, Ferreira joined Romanian club CS Universitatea Craiova. He played his first game in the Liga I nine days later, when he featured 77 minutes in a 1–1 away draw with FC Steaua București.

Ferreira was released by mutual consent on 23 April 2020.

=== MTK ===
On 11 June 2020, Ferreira agreed to a contract at MTK Budapest FC of the Hungarian Nemzeti Bajnokság I. He scored his only goal on 29 April 2021, in a 1–3 home defeat against Fehérvár FC.

After struggling to find a place in the team under coaches Vaszilisz Teodoru and Gábor Márton, Ferreira severed his ties in January 2022.

=== Later career ===
Subsequently, Ferreira represented in quick succession Tractor SC (Persian Gulf Pro League), FK Kukësi (Albanian Kategoria Superiore), C.D. Trofense, U.D. Leiria, F.C. Paços de Ferreira and Porto B (all in the Portuguese second division).

== International career ==
Ferreira earned 84 caps for Portugal at youth level. He appeared in two FIFA World Cup tournaments with the under-20 team, helping them to finish second in the 2011 edition in Colombia.

== Career statistics ==
As of 4 May 2024

Appearances and goals by club, season and competition
Club	Season	League			National cup (Note: Includes Taça de Portugal, Cupa României, Albanian Cup)		League cup (Note: Includes Taça da Liga)		Continental		Other		Total	
Club	Season	Division	Apps	Goals	Apps	Goals	Apps	Goals	Apps	Goals	Apps	Goals	Apps	Goals
Porto B	2012–13	Segunda Liga	36	0	—		—		—		—		36	0
Porto B	2013–14	Segunda Liga	34	1	—		—		—		—		34	1
Porto B	Total		70	1	0	0	0	0	0	0	0	0	70	1
Zulte Waregem	2014–15	Belgian Pro League	2	0	0	0	—		1 (Note: Appearances in UEFA Europa League)	0	—		3	0
União Madeira	2015–16	Primeira Liga	7	0	1	0	1	0	—		—		9	0
União Madeira	2016–17	Liga Pro	25	1	0	0	1	0	—		—		26	1
União Madeira	Total		32	1	1	0	2	0	0	0	0	0	35	1
Universitatea Craiova	2017–18	Liga I	27	0	5	0	—		1	0	—		33	0
Universitatea Craiova	2018–19	Liga I	25	0	3	0	—		2	0	1 (Note: Appearance in Supercupa României)	0	31	0
Universitatea Craiova	2019–20	Liga I	9	0	2	0	—		1	0	—		12	0
Universitatea Craiova	Total		61	0	10	0	0	0	4	0	1	0	76	0
MTK	2020–21	Nemzeti Bajnokság I	16	1	0	0	—		—		—		16	1
MTK	2021–22	Nemzeti Bajnokság I	11	0	0	0	—		—		—		11	0
MTK	Total		27	1	0	0	0	0	0	0	0	0	27	1
Tractor	2021–22	Persian Gulf Pro League	5	0	0	0	—		—		—		5	0
Kukësi	2022–23	Kategoria Superiore	13	1	1	0	—		—		—		14	1
Trofense	2022–23	Liga Portugal 2	18	0	0	0	0	0	—		—		18	0
União Leiria	2023–24	Liga Portugal 2	14	1	0	0	0	0	—		—		14	1
Career total			242	5	12	0	2	0	5	0	1	0	262	5

== Honours ==
Universitatea Craiova

- Cupa României: 2017–18
- Supercupa României runner-up: 2018

Portugal U20

- FIFA U-20 World Cup runner-up: 2011

Orders

- Knight of the Order of Prince Henry
