= Godwords Amedome =

Ghanaian footballer (born 2002)

Personal information
- Date of birth: 7 October 2002 (age 24)
- Place of birth: Kumasi, Ghana
- Height: 1.68 m (5 ft 6 in)
- Position: Right-back

Team information
- Current team: MŠK Žilina Africa

Senior career*
| Years | Team | Apps | (Gls) |
| –2021 | MŠK Žilina Africa | | |
| 2021–2023 | MTK Budapest | 3 | (0) |
| 2021–2023 | → MTK Budapest II | 35 | (0) |
| 2022 | → Nyíregyháza (loan) | 9 | (0) |
| 2023 | Jonava | 9 | (0) |
| 2024–2026 | Snina | 35 | (5) |
| 2026– | MŠK Žilina Africa | 0 | (0) |
- * Club domestic league appearances and goals as of 10:34, 5 February 2026 (UTC)

Godwords Amedome (born 7 October 2002) is a Ghanaian professional footballer who plays as a right-back for MŠK Žilina Africa.

== Career ==
=== MTK Budapest ===
In January 2021, he arrived for a trial with MTK Budapest, and on 16 February 2021, the club announced his transfer from MŠK Žilina Africa. He first joined the U19 team. In the summer of 2022, he travelled with the first team to a training camp in Slovenia. He made his debut for MTK as a substitute against Diósgyőr on 9 September 2022. He scored his first goal in the Hungarian Cup against Felsőzsolca.

==== Loan to Nyíregyháza Spartacus ====
On 26 January 2022, MTK loaned him to Nyíregyháza in the hope of more playing opportunities for the rest of the 2021–22 season. He made his debut four days later in a league match against Tiszakécske, replacing Gábor Jánvári in the 86th minute. During his loan spell, he made a total of nine appearances.

=== Jonava ===
On 31 July 2023, his contract was terminated with MTK Budapest and signed for a Lithuanian second division team Jonava.

=== Snina ===
On 22 July 2024, Godwords signed a contract with Slovak club MFK Snina. On 31 August 2024, in a league match against MFK Vranov nad Topľou, he was shown a red card and subsequently received a three-week suspension following a confrontation with an opposing player. During the same match, MFK Vranov was fined €700 by the Slovak Football Association after racist chants were reported from sections of the home supporters directed at Godwords. He returned to the squad on 29 September 2024 in a match against MŠK Lučenec. Six days later, on 6 October 2024, he scored his first goal for MFK Snina in a league match against Poprad. In January 2026, the club confirmed that Godwords was not included in the winter preparation squad and would leave MFK Snina due to unresolved visa issues, despite the club's intention to retain him.

== Career statistics ==
=== Club ===
Appearances and goals by club, season and competition
| Club | Season | League | | | National cup (Note: Includes Magyar Kupa, Slovak Cup) | | Europe | | Other | | Total | |
| Club | Season | Division | Apps | Goals | Apps | Goals | Apps | Goals | Apps | Goals | Apps | Goals |
|---|---|---|---|---|---|---|---|---|---|---|---|---|
| MTK Budapest II | 2021–22 | Nemzeti Bajnokság III | 14 | 0 | – | | – | | – | | 14 | 0 |
| MTK Budapest II | 2022–23 | Nemzeti Bajnokság III | 21 | 0 | – | | – | | – | | 21 | 0 |
| MTK Budapest II | Total | | 35 | 0 | 0 | 0 | 0 | 0 | 0 | 0 | 35 | 0 |
| Nyíregyháza Spartacus (loan) | 2021–22 | Nemzeti Bajnokság II | 9 | 0 | – | | – | | – | | 9 | 0 |
| MTK Budapest | 2021–22 | Nemzeti Bajnokság I | – | | 1 | 0 | – | | – | | 1 | 0 |
| MTK Budapest | 2022–23 | Nemzeti Bajnokság II | 2 | 0 | 1 | 1 | – | | – | | 3 | 1 |
| MTK Budapest | Total | | 11 | 0 | 2 | 1 | 0 | 0 | 0 | 0 | 13 | 1 |
| FK Jonava | 2023 | Lithuanian I Lyga | 9 | 0 | – | | – | | – | | 9 | 0 |
| MFK Snina | 2024–25 | Slovak 3. Liga | 25 | 4 | 3 | 0 | – | | 1 (Note: Appearance(s) in Slovak 3. Liga promotion play-offs) | 0 | 29 | 4 |
| MFK Snina | 2025–26 | Slovak 3. Liga | 10 | 1 | 1 | 0 | – | | – | | 11 | 1 |
| Career total | | | 90 | 5 | 6 | 1 | 0 | 0 | 1 | 0 | 97 | 6 |

== Honours ==
MTK Budapest

- Nemzeti Bajnokság II runner-up: 2022–23
