= Ákos Zuigéber =

Hungarian footballer (born 2002)

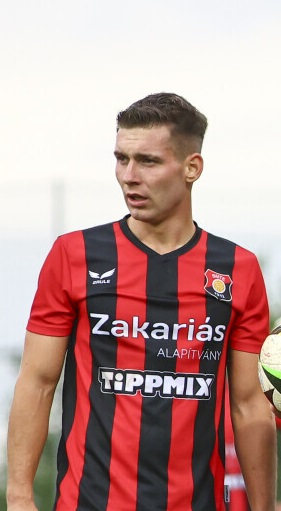
- Zuigéber playing for Budafok in 2024

Personal information
- Full name: Ákos Lajos Zuigéber
- Date of birth: 8 November 2002 (age 23)
- Place of birth: Budapest, Hungary
- Height: 1.75 m (5 ft 9 in)
- Position: Right winger

Team information
- Current team: Honvéd
- Number: 7

Youth career
- 2009–2013: Újpest
- 2013–2020: MTK Budapest

Senior career*
Years	Team	Apps	(Gls)
2019–2025	MTK Budapest	31	(10)
2020–2021	→ Dorog (loan)	25	(3)
2021–2022	→ Budafok (loan)	34	(5)
2022–2023	→ MTK II	16	(11)
2024	→ Szeged (loan)	11	(1)
2024–2025	→ Budafok (loan)	25	(4)
2025–	Budapest Honvéd	27	(10)

International career^{‡}
2017	Hungary U16	13	(2)
2018–2019	Hungary U17	14	(8)
2019	Hungary U18	1	(0)
- * Club domestic league appearances and goals as of 31 May 2026 ‡ National team caps and goals as of 9 December 2019

Ákos Lajos Zuigéber (born 8 November 2002) is a Hungarian professional footballer who plays as a right winger for Nemzeti Bajnokság II club Honvéd.

== Club career ==
Zuigéber made his professional debut with MTK on the 4 August 2019 against Csákvár. He already made an impact on his second game, scoring two goals against Dorog on the 11 August 2019. Zuigéber also played in the UEFA Youth League with the club U19.

On 28 July 2020, Zuigéber joined Dorog on loan from MTK for the 2020–21 season.

On 6 July 2021, Zuigéber joined Budafok on a new season-long loan. On 22 December 2023, Zuigéber moved on a new loan to Szeged.

== International career ==
Zuigéber is a U17 international with Hungary, having allowed his team to qualify for both European championship and U17 World cup.

== Career statistics ==
As of match played 15 February 2026

Appearances and goals by club, season and competition
Club	Season	League			Magyar Kupa		Total	
Club	Season	Division	Apps	Goals	Apps	Goals	Apps	Goals
MTK	2019–20	Nemzeti Bajnokság II	4	2	0	0	4	2
MTK	2022–23	Nemzeti Bajnokság II	22	8	3	5	25	13
MTK	2023–24	Nemzeti Bajnokság I	5	0	2	0	7	0
MTK	Total		31	10	5	5	36	15
Dorog (loan)	2020–21	Nemzeti Bajnokság II	25	3	0	0	25	3
Budafok (loan)	2021–22	Nemzeti Bajnokság II	34	5	1	0	35	5
MTK II	2022–23	Nemzeti Bajnokság III	9	8	—		9	8
MTK II	2023–24	Nemzeti Bajnokság III	7	3	—		7	3
MTK II	Total		16	11	—		16	11
Szeged (loan)	2023–24	Nemzeti Bajnokság II	11	1	—		11	1
Budafok (loan)	2024–25	Nemzeti Bajnokság II	25	4	1	0	26	4
Honvéd	2025–26	Nemzeti Bajnokság II	16	7	2	1	18	8
Career total			158	41	9	6	167	47
