= Slobodan Rajković =

Serbian footballer (born 1989)

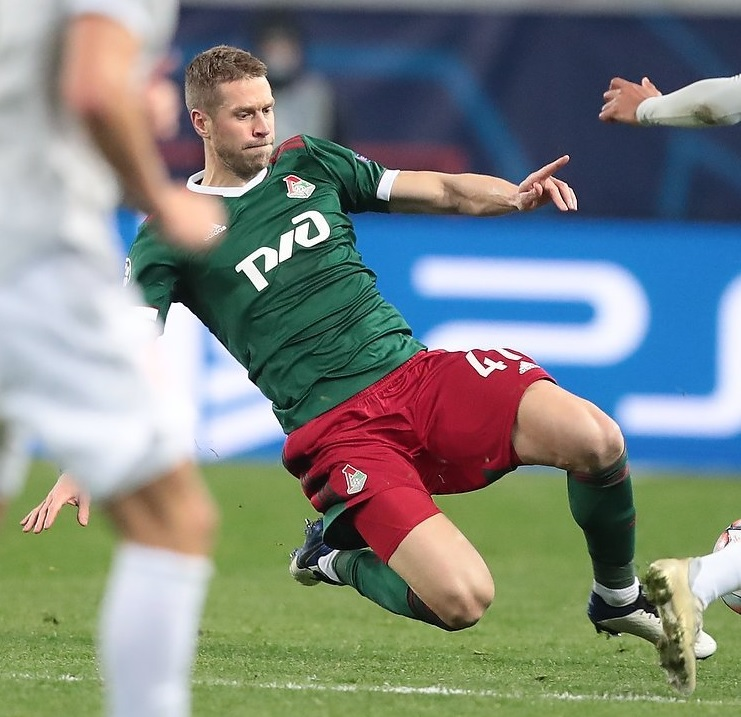
- Rajković with Lokomotiv Moscow in 2020

Personal information
- Date of birth: 3 February 1989 (age 37)
- Place of birth: Belgrade, SR Serbia, Yugoslavia
- Height: 1.91 m (6 ft 3 in)
- Position: Centre back

Senior career*
Years	Team	Apps	(Gls)
2005–2007	OFK Beograd	37	(1)
2007–2011	Chelsea	0	(0)
2007–2008	→ PSV (loan)	13	(0)
2008–2010	→ Twente (loan)	23	(1)
2010–2011	→ Vitesse (loan)	24	(0)
2011–2015	Hamburger SV	42	(2)
2012–2014	Hamburger SV II	5	(1)
2015–2016	Darmstadt 98	15	(1)
2016–2019	Palermo	46	(3)
2020	Perugia	12	(0)
2020–2021	Lokomotiv Moscow	5	(0)
2021–2022	TSC	5	(1)
2022	MTK Budapest	11	(1)
Total		238	(11)

International career
2007–2010	Serbia U21	8	(0)
2008–2016	Serbia	19	(0)
Medal record
Silver medal – second place	UEFA Under-21 Championship	2007
- * Club domestic league appearances and goals

Slobodan Rajković (Serbian Cyrillic: Слободан Рајковић, pronounced [slobǒdan rǎːjkoʋitɕ]; born 3 February 1989) is a Serbian retired footballer who played as a centre back.

== Club career ==
Born in Belgrade, Rajković started his career with OFK Beograd. He was included in the club's first team at the age of 15. During his second season in the first team, Rajković's reputation grew so such that in November 2005, English Premier League club Chelsea decided to pay €2 million for the 16-year-old centre-half.

Under the terms of the deal, Rajković stayed at OFK Beograd as a loaned player from Chelsea until the end of the 2006–07 Serbian SuperLiga season.

=== Loans in the Eredivisie ===
In June 2007, Chelsea decided to loan Rajković to PSV ahead of the 2007–08 season, as part of the deal surrounding Alex's move to Chelsea.

After the year-long loan spell at PSV, the Dutch club wanted to extend the loan period for another year, but Chelsea declined due to the lack of playing time Rajković was receiving in his season at Eindhoven. Rajković, however, returned to the Eredivisie on 9 July 2008, joining Twente on a one-year loan deal.

After spitting at a referee at the 2008 Summer Olympics, Rajković was banned for 12 months by FIFA. In June 2009, his loan was extended until June 2010.

On 23 August 2010, Rajković transferred to another Eredivisie club, Vitesse, together with his former Chelsea teammates Nemanja Matić and Matej Delač on a season-long loan.

=== Chelsea ===
Having returned to Chelsea prior to the 2011–12 season at the request of new manager André Villas-Boas, Rajković played his first game in a Chelsea shirt in a friendly against Wycombe Wanderers on 12 July 2011 at Chelsea's Cobham Training Centre. He played the second half and scored his side's third goal, volleying home a Yuri Zhirkov corner.

Four years after signing for Chelsea, Rajković still remained ineligible for either a work permit or an EU passport, precluding his ability to play in matches open to the public (hence why he played in the closed door game with Wycombe, but could not play against Portsmouth). However, he finally made his debut in a pre-season friendly game against a Malaysian XI, in which he played the whole of the first half. He also played against Kitchee SC in the 2011 Barclays Asia Trophy in Hong Kong.

=== Hamburger SV ===
On 23 August 2011, Rajković joined Bundesliga club Hamburger SV from Chelsea on a four-year deal for €2 million. He did not manage to secure the starter's position in his four years at the club, making only 46 appearances in all competitions.

=== Darmstadt 98 ===
On 29 September 2015, Rajković signed for Darmstadt 98 on a two-year deal.

=== Palermo ===
On 1 August 2016, he was signed by Serie A club Palermo. He played a total three seasons for the Rosanero (one in Serie A, and two in Serie B).

Following Palermo's exclusion from the Serie B, he was released together with all other players in July 2019.

=== Perugia ===
On 27 January 2020, after six months of inactivity, Rajković signed a two-and-a-half-year contract with Serie B club Perugia as a free transfer.

=== Lokomotiv Moscow ===
On 13 August 2020, he signed a one-year contract with Russian Premier League club FC Lokomotiv Moscow. On 19 January 2021, his Lokomotiv contract was terminated by mutual consent.

=== MTK Budapest ===
On 10 January 2022, Rajković signed with MTK Budapest in Hungary.

== International career ==
By the age of 16, Rajković was a regular in the Serbia under-21 national team, later becoming the youngest player ever to appear in a qualifying match of the UEFA European Under-21 Football Championship. On 17 June 2007, during the 2007 UEFA European Under-21 Football Championship, which the Serbia U21 team eventually finished as runners-up in, Rajković was part of a controversial second goal for England. He was lying on the ground, injured, and while Serbian players expected their rivals would kick the ball out of the field, Matt Derbyshire went on against a bewildered Serbian defence to score the second goal of the night for England, provoking a turbulent reaction from the Serbian players. Rajković was called for a national team match in 2016, after more than two years.

He earned a total of 19 caps (no goals) and his final international was a June 2016 friendly match against Russia.

== Style of play ==
Rajković is known as a highly aggressive player. After his arrival to Hamburger SV, he stated in an interview, "I like to play more aggressive than the referees like."

== Career statistics ==
=== Club ===
Appearances and goals by club, season and competition
Club	Season	League			Cup (Note: Includes KNVB Cup, DFB-Pokal and Coppa Italia.)		Continental (Note: Includes UEFA Europa League and UEFA Champions League.)		Other		Total	
Club	Season	Division	Apps	Goals	Apps	Goals	Apps	Goals	Apps	Goals	Apps	Goals
OFK Beograd	2004–05	First League of Serbia and Montenegro	6	0	0	0	0	0	–		6	0
OFK Beograd	2005–06	First League of Serbia and Montenegro	20	1	1	0	2	0	–		23	1
OFK Beograd	2006–07	Serbian SuperLiga	11	0	0	0	1	0	–		12	0
OFK Beograd	Total		37	1	1	0	3	0	0	0	41	1
PSV (loan)	2007–08	Eredivisie	13	0	0	0	5	0	–		18	0
Twente (loan)	2008–09	Eredivisie	13	1	4	0	3	0	–		20	1
Twente (loan)	2009–10	Eredivisie	10	0	1	0	3	0	–		14	0
Twente (loan)	Total		23	1	5	0	6	0	0	0	34	1
Vitesse (loan)	2010–11	Eredivisie	24	0	3	0	–		–		27	0
Hamburger SV	2011–12	Bundesliga	16	1	1	0	–		–		17	1
Hamburger SV	2012–13	Bundesliga	13	0	0	0	–		–		13	0
Hamburger SV	2013–14	Bundesliga	2	0	0	0	–		–		2	0
Hamburger SV	2014–15	Bundesliga	11	1	2	0	–		–		13	1
Hamburger SV	Total		42	2	3	0	0	0	0	0	45	2
Hamburger SV II	2012–13	Regionalliga Nord	4	1	–		–		–		4	1
Hamburger SV II	2014–15	Regionalliga Nord	1	0	–		–		–		1	0
Hamburger SV II	Total		5	1	–		–		–		5	1
Darmstadt 98	2015–16	Bundesliga	15	1	2	0	–		–		17	1
Palermo	2016–17	Serie A	4	0	1	0	–		–		5	0
Palermo	2017–18	Serie B	12	1	0	0	–		4	0	16	1
Palermo	2018–19	Serie B	30	2	2	2	–		–		32	4
Palermo	Total		46	3	3	2	0	0	4	0	53	5
Perugia	2019–20	Serie B	12	0	0	0	–		–		12	0
Lokomotiv Moscow	2020–21	Russian Premier League	5	0	0	0	4	0	–		9	0
TSC	2021–22	Serbian SuperLiga	5	1	0	0	0	0	–		5	1
MTK Budapest	2021–22	Nemzeti Bajnokság I	11	1	0	0	0	0	–		11	1
Career total			238	11	17	2	18	0	4	0	277	13

=== International ===
Appearances and goals by national team and year
National team	Year	Apps	Goals
Serbia	2008	2	0
Serbia	2009	0	0
Serbia	2010	2	0
Serbia	2011	7	0
Serbia	2012	2	0
Serbia	2013	1	0
Serbia	2014	0	0
Serbia	2015	0	0
Serbia	2016	5	0
Total		19	0

== Honours ==
PSV

- Eredivisie: 2007–08

Twente

- Eredivisie: 2009–10
