= Sebastián Herrera (footballer, born 1995) =

Macedonian footballer (born 1995)

Personal information
- Full name: Sebastián Herrera Cardona
- Date of birth: 23 January 1995 (age 31)
- Place of birth: Bello, Colombia
- Height: 1.78 m (5 ft 10 in)
- Position: Left-back

Team information
- Current team: Borac Banja Luka
- Number: 16

Senior career*
Years	Team	Apps	(Gls)
2014–2015	Deportivo Pereira	3	(0)
2015–2020	Rabotnički	108	(7)
2020–2022	MTK Budapest	41	(1)
2022–2023	Bregalnica Štip	11	(1)
2023	Doxa Katokopias	8	(0)
2023–	Borac Banja Luka	91	(6)

International career^{‡}
2026–	North Macedonia	5	(0)
- * Club domestic league appearances and goals as of 20 September 2026 ‡ National team caps and goals as of 3 October 2026

Sebastián Herrera Cardona (Macedonian: Себастијан Ерера Кардона; born 23 January 1995) is a professional footballer who plays as a left-back for Bosnian Premier League club Borac Banja Luka. Born in Colombia, he represents North Macedonia at international level.

== Career ==
Herrera began his professional career at Deportivo Pereira where he made his senior debut playing in the Postobón Cup against their "Clásico Cafetero" rivals Once Caldas. On 1 July 2015, he signed a contract with Macedonian First Football League side Rabotnički where he played for five years and received Macedonian citizenship.

In 2020, Herrera signed for MTK Budapest, one of Hungary's most successful clubs.

On 26 January 2023, Herrera signed with Doxa Katokopias in Cyprus.

On 8 July 2023, Bosnian Premier League side Borac Banja Luka announced the signing of Herrera.

== International career ==
Born in Colombia, Herrera gained Macedonian citizenship after living in the country for 5 years. He was called up to the North Macedonia national team for 2026 FIFA World Cup qualification play off match in March 2026.

== Career statistics ==
=== Club ===
As of match played 20 September 2026

Appearances and goals by club, season and competition
Club	Season	League			National cup (Note: Includes Copa Colombia, Hungarian Cup, Cypriot Cup, Bosnian Cup)		Continental		Other		Total	
Club	Season	Division	Apps	Goals	Apps	Goals	Apps	Goals	Apps	Goals	Apps	Goals
Deportivo Pereira	2014	Categoría Primera B	0	0	2	0	—		—		2	0
Rabotnički	2015–16	Macedonian First League	15	1	—		—		—		15	1
Rabotnički	2016–17	Macedonian First League	29	1	—		2 (Note: Appearances in UEFA Europa League)	0	—		31	1
Rabotnički	2017–18	Macedonian First League	16	2	—		4	0	—		20	2
Rabotnički	2018–19	Macedonian First League	29	3	—		2	0	—		31	3
Rabotnički	2019–20	Macedonian First League	19	0	—		—		—		19	0
Rabotnički	Total		108	7	—		8	0	—		116	7
MTK Budapest	2020–21	Nemzeti Bajnokság I	26	1	2	1	—		—		28	2
MTK Budapest	2021–22	Nemzeti Bajnokság I	15	0	1	0	—		—		16	0
MTK Budapest	Total		41	1	3	1	—		—		44	2
Bregalnica Štip	2022–23	Macedonian First League	11	1	—		—		—		11	1
Doxa Katokopias	2022–23	Cypriot First Division	8	0	2	0	—		—		10	0
Borac Banja Luka	2023–24	Bosnian Premier League	30	1	4	0	2 (Note: Appearances in UEFA Conference League)	0	—		36	1
Borac Banja Luka	2024–25	Bosnian Premier League	28	1	4	1	15 (Note: Four appearances and one goal in UEFA Champions League, two appearances in UEFA Europa League, nine appearances in UEFA Conference League)	1	1 (Note: Appearance in the Bosnian Supercup)	0	48	3
Borac Banja Luka	2025–26	Bosnian Premier League	28	2	0	0	2	1	—		30	3
Borac Banja Luka	2026–27	Bosnian Premier League	5	2	0	0	8 (Note: Two appearances in UEFA Champions League, six appearances in UEFA Conference League)	1	—		13	3
Borac Banja Luka	Total		91	6	8	1	27	3	1	0	127	10
Career total			259	15	15	2	35	3	1	0	310	20

=== International ===
As of match played 3 October 2026

Appearances and goals by national team and year
National team	Year	Apps	Goals
North Macedonia	2026	5	0
Total		5	0

== Honours ==
Borac Banja Luka

- Bosnian Premier League: 2023–24, 2025–26
