= Branislav Sluka =

Slovak footballer

Personal information
- Date of birth: 23 January 1999 (age 27)
- Place of birth: Žilina, Slovakia
- Height: 1.80 m (5 ft 11 in)
- Position: Left back

Team information
- Current team: Púchov
- Number: 11

Youth career
- 2008–2009: FC Ajax Slimáčik Žilina
- 2009–2018: Žilina

Senior career*
Years	Team	Apps	(Gls)
2016–2021	→ Žilina B	36	(2)
2018–2023	Žilina	83	(7)
2022	→ MTK Budapest (loan)	13	(0)
2022–2023	→ České Budějovice (loan)	15	(1)
2023–2024	ViOn Zlaté Moravce	8	(0)
2024	Turan	12	(1)
2024–2025	Komárno	6	(0)
2025–	Púchov	7	(0)

International career^{‡}
2015–2016	Slovakia U17	6	(1)
2017	Slovakia U18	5	(0)
2018	Slovakia U19	3	(0)
2018–2020	Slovakia U21	13	(2)
- * Club domestic league appearances and goals as of 18 January 2026 ‡ National team caps and goals as of 17 November 2020

Branislav Sluka (born 23 January 1999) is a Slovak professional footballer who plays as a left-back for Slovak club Púchov.

== Club career ==
Sluka made his professional Slovak Super Liga debut for Žilina against Nitra on 28 July 2018. Sluka had replaced Jaroslav Mihalík three minutes before the stoppage time. Žilina had won 2-1.

In September 2023, Sluka returned to Slovakia with ViOn Zlaté Moravce on a one-year deal.

== International career ==
Sluka was first recognised in a senior national team nomination on 28 May 2019, when coach Pavel Hapal named him as an alternate defender for a double fixture in June - a home friendly against Jordan, to which 29 players were unusually called-up and a UEFA Euro 2020 qualifying fixture against Azerbaijan, played away on 11 June 2019. He also featured as an alternate under Hapal's successor Štefan Tarkovič, for example ahead of two international friendly fixtures against Norway and Finland in March 2022. In December 2022, Sluka was first shortlisted in the nomination by Francesco Calzona, who joined the team in late summer, for senior national team prospective players' training camp at NTC Senec.

== Honours ==
Individual

- Slovak Super Liga U-21 Team of the Season: 2020-21
