= Márkó Futács =

Hungarian footballer (born 1990)

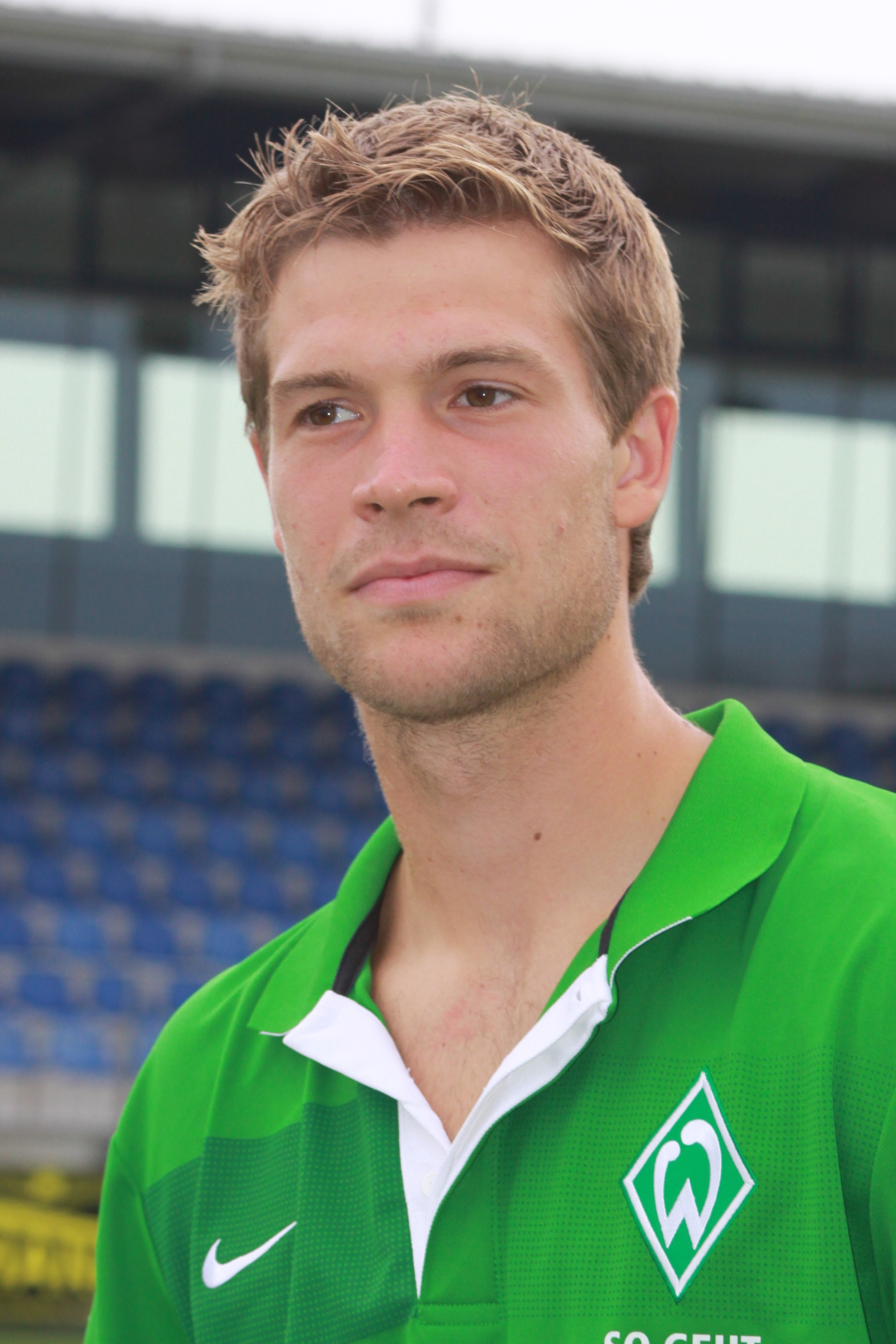
- Futács in 2009

Personal information
- Full name: Márkó Futács
- Date of birth: 22 February 1990 (age 36)
- Place of birth: Budapest, Hungary
- Height: 1.96 m (6 ft 5 in)
- Position: Forward

Team information
- Current team: Budapest Honvéd

Youth career
- III. Kerület
- –2006: Ferencváros
- 2006–2009: Nancy

Senior career*
Years	Team	Apps	(Gls)
2009–2011	Werder Bremen II	13	(3)
2010–2011	→ Ingolstadt 04 (loan)	23	(2)
2011–2012	Portsmouth	29	(5)
2012–2014	Leicester City	9	(1)
2013	→ Blackpool (loan)	4	(0)
2013–2014	→ Diósgyőr (loan)	22	(9)
2014–2016	Mersin İdmanyurdu	30	(4)
2016–2018	Hajduk Split	27	(20)
2019–2021	Fehérvár	37	(11)
2021	Zalaegerszeg TE	16	(4)
2021	Olimpija Ljubljana	5	(1)
2022–2023	MTK	31	(16)
2024–	Budapest Honvéd	0	(0)

International career
2009	Hungary U20	7	(1)
2010–2012	Hungary U21	9	(2)
2014	Hungary	3	(0)
- * Club domestic league appearances and goals as of 4 April 2024

Márkó Futács (pronounced [ˈmaːrkoː ˈfutaːt͡ʃ]; born 22 February 1990) is a Hungarian professional footballer who plays as a forward for Budapest Honvéd.

== Club career ==
=== Early career ===
Futács started his youth career at III. Kerületi TUE from Óbuda in his hometown Budapest. He soon transferred to second-tier club Ferencváros.

In the summer of 2006, Futács went to France, signing for AS Nancy where he scored 18 goals in 21 matches with the under-18 team. In the 2007–08 season, he was part of AS Nancy B, the club's second team.

=== Werder Bremen ===
In early 2009, Futács signed a professional contract at SV Werder Bremen until June 2011. He made his Werder Bremen first-team debut on 20 July 2009 in a pre-season 2–1 win over Wolfsburg, replacing Marcelo Moreno in the 60th minute. Futács scored two goals in four friendly matches with Bremen in the summer of 2009 before going on to play for the club's reserve team.

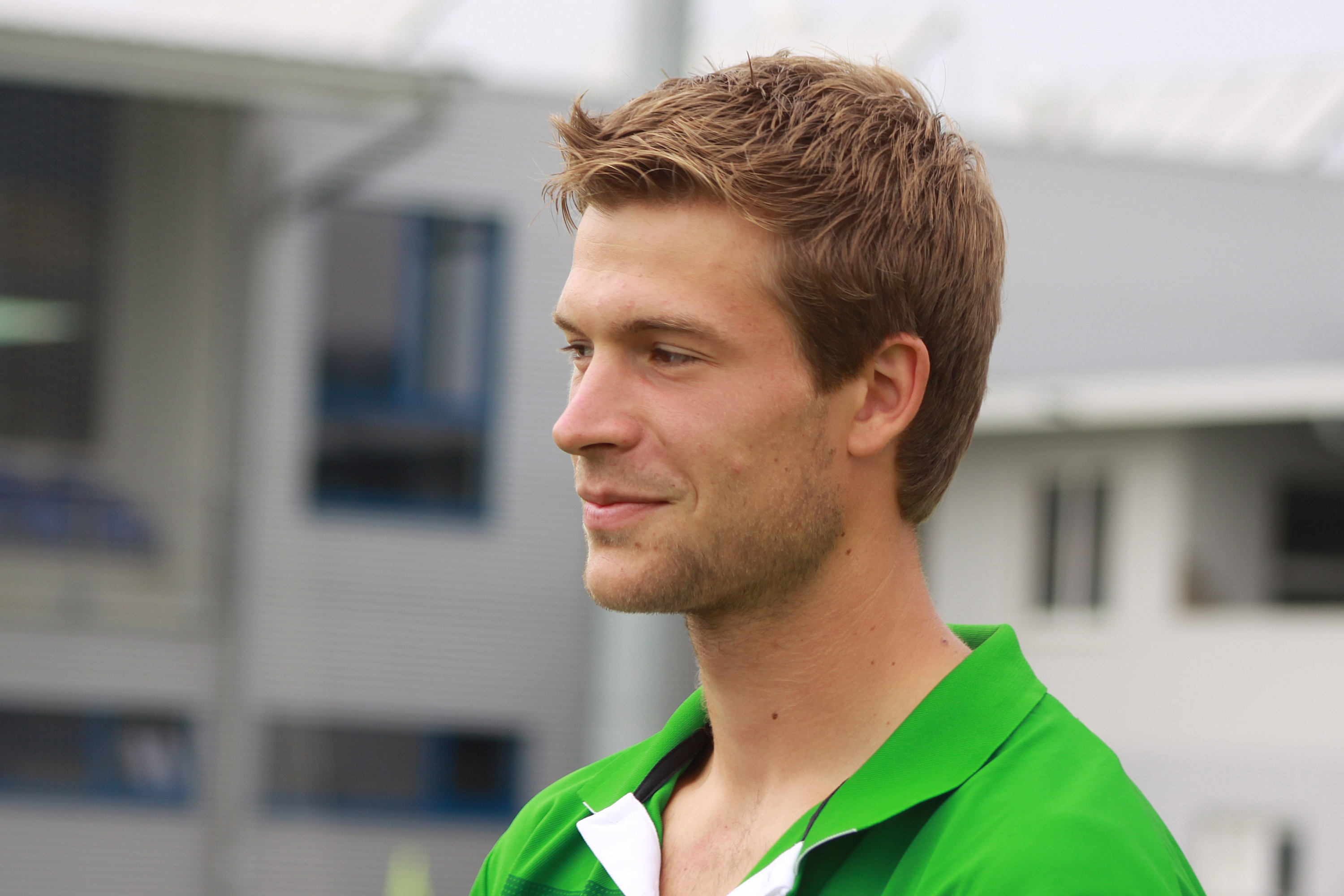
Futács with Werder

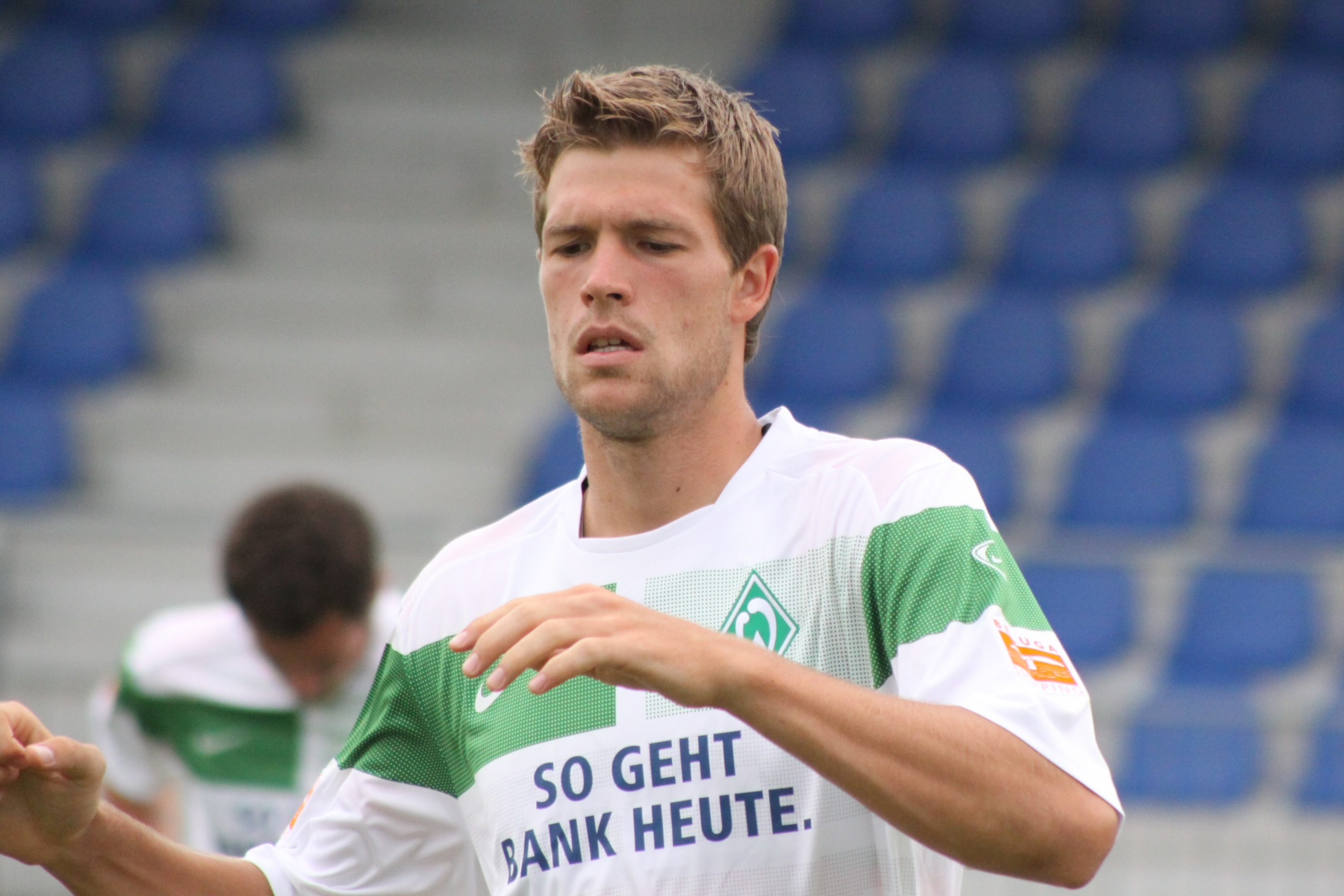
Futács with Werder

=== Portsmouth ===
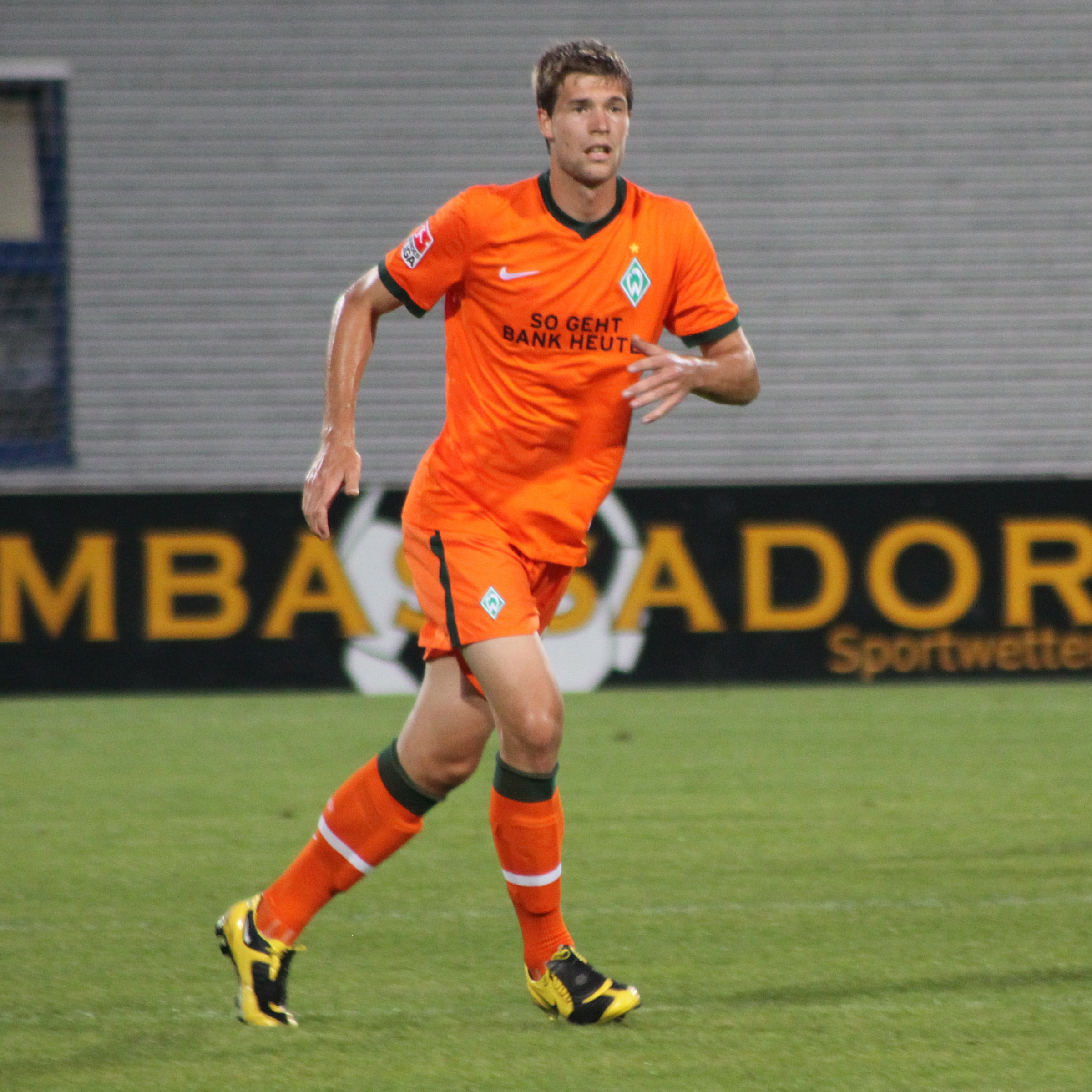
Futacs in a match during his time at Werder Bremen.

On 26 August 2011, Futács signed a one-year deal with Championship side Portsmouth, with an option for a further year. He made his league debut as a late substitute in the 4–3 defeat away to West Ham United in September 2011. He scored his first goal in October 2011, in a 2–0 friendly win against Russian Premier League side FC Rostov.

He scored his first league goal on his starting debut in December 2011, in a 1–1 away draw against Leicester City. Two days later, he scored his second for the club in the next match against Watford. In January 2012, after scoring two goals in four appearances, his performances were described as "impressive" and Portsmouth announced that Futács would be staying for an extra season after the club activated a clause in his contract. On 21 January 2012, he scored his third goal for the club, as Portsmouth lost 3–2 against Cardiff City. During the winter transfer period, Celtic and Rangers expressed interest in signing Futács, with Rangers wanting him to replace the departing Nikica Jelavić and Celtic seeking a target-man. No move materialised before the transfer deadline was closed, and Portsmouth was keen to keep Futács as their striker while he considered staying with Portsmouth Football Club to help them secure survival in the Championship after they were losing a number of key players due to financial problems.

Futács scored his fourth goal for the club, as Portsmouth won 4–1 against Birmingham City on 20 March 2012, giving the club their first win since the club entered administration. On 14 April 2012, Futács replaced Rekik in the 76th minute against Doncaster Rovers and scored in stoppage time to earn a 4–3 win for Pompey. However, Portsmouth was relegated from the Championship League, in the wake of financial problems.

At the end of the season, Futács considered remaining with Portsmouth Football Club with manager Appleton stating Futács could play a key role at Portsmouth. On 2 July, however, Futács decided to leave Portsmouth after Appleton explained that the club could not offer him a better contract, in the midst of financial disarray. On 12 July, it was revealed that Futács was in talks with Leicester City about a proposed move after leaving Portsmouth.

=== Leicester City ===
On 14 July 2012, Futács agreed to terms with Championship club Leicester City. He was seen as a replacement for former target man Steve Howard who left on 19 May 2012. As a result of the move, Portsmouth was given compensation, as Futacs was under 24, and highly desirable for Leicester City. He was given the number twenty-nine shirt.

Futács joined up with the rest of the squad on 15 July, flying out to Austria for a pre-season week-long training camp. He scored his first goal for Leicester against Burton Albion in the League Cup on 28 August 2012. He scored his first league goal for City in their 6–0 rout of Ipswich Town on 17 November 2012.

On 5 March 2013, Futács agreed to a one-month loan for Blackpool. He made his debut against Birmingham the same day. After one month with Blackpool, he returned to Leicester City.

In June 2014, following his loan to Diósgyőr, Futács was released from his contract.

=== Diósgyőr ===
For the 2013–14 season, Futács joined Hungarian team Diósgyőr on a season-long loan. He scored on his debut on 14 September 2013, in a 2–0 win over Puskás Akadémia. He scored in another match on 5 October 2013, as his club beat Mezőkövesd 5–0. In the two games of the last season, Futacs added two goals to make it nine, scoring against Pécs on 17 May 2014 and another against Székesfehérvár on 1 June 2014.

Futács continued to make an impressive display for the club, scoring twelve goals in all competitions. Diósgyőr was keen to sign him for another season.

=== Mersin İdmanyurdu ===
After his time at Diósgyőr, Futács joined the Turkish Super League club Mersin İdmanyurdu on a two-year contract.

=== Hajduk Split ===
Futács signed for Hajduk Split on 6 July 2016. In his first season he became the league top scorer with 18 goals, the first from outside the former Yugoslavia. Futács injured his anterior cruciate ligament in a Round 4 Croatian First Football League match against GNK Dinamo Zagreb in June 2017 and was subsequently ruled out for six to eight months. Futács signed a one-year contract extension in January 2018, with his previous deal set to expire at the end of the 2017–18 season.

=== MTK ===
On 30 December 2021, Futács agreed to join MTK. On 18 September 2023, Futács left MTK by mutual consent.

=== Budapest Honvéd ===
On 2 April 2024, Futács joined Nemzeti Bajnokság II club Budapest Honvéd on a contract until the end of the season.

== International career ==
Futács was a member of the Hungarian under-20 team, which won the bronze medal at the 2009 FIFA U-20 World Cup in Egypt. At the tournament, he scored one goal in the semi-finals against Ghana.

He made his debut for the senior team on 5 March 2014, in a 2–1 defeat against Finland in a friendly match, coming on as a second-half substitute for Vladimir Koman.

== Career statistics ==
=== Club ===
As of 27 June 2020

Appearances and goals by club, season and competition
Club	Season	League			National cup		League cup		Continental		Total	
Club	Season	Division	Apps	Goals	Apps	Goals	Apps	Goals	Apps	Goals	Apps	Goals
Nancy B	2008–09	CFA	12	3	—		—		—		12	3
Werder Bremen II	2009–10	3. Liga	13	3	—		—		—		13	3
FC Ingolstadt (loan)	2010–11	2. Bundesliga	23	2	2	0	—		—		25	2
Portsmouth	2011–12	Championship	29	5	1	0	—		—		30	5
Leicester City	2012–13	Championship	9	1	1	0	1	1	—		11	2
Blackpool (loan)	2012–13	Championship	4	0	—		—		—		4	0
Diósgyőr (loan)	2013–14	Nemzeti Bajnokság I	22	9	5	3	8	3	—		35	15
Mersin İdmanyurdu	2014–15	Süper Lig	26	4	9	2	—		—		35	6
Mersin İdmanyurdu	2015–16	Süper Lig	4	0	—		—		—		4	0
Mersin İdmanyurdu	Total		30	4	9	2	0	0	0	0	39	6
Hajduk Split	2016–17	1. HNL	26	18	2	3	—		—		28	21
Hajduk Split	2017–18	1. HNL	11	2	1	0	—		4	1	16	3
Hajduk Split	Total		37	20	3	3	0	0	4	1	44	24
Fehérvár	2018–19	Nemzeti Bajnokság I	13	2	5	2	—		0	0	18	4
Fehérvár	2019–20	Nemzeti Bajnokság I	24	9	9	3	—		4	0	37	12
Fehérvár	Total		37	11	14	5	–	–	4	0	55	16
Career total			216	58	35	13	9	4	8	1	268	76

== Honours ==
Werder Bremen

- DFB-Supercup: 2009–10

Diósgyőr

- Hungarian League Cup: 2013–14

Fehérvár

- Hungarian Cup: 2018–19

Hungary

- FIFA U-20 World Cup third place: 2009

Individual

- Croatian First Football League top scorer: 2016–17
