= Márk Kovácsréti =

Hungarian footballer (born 2000)

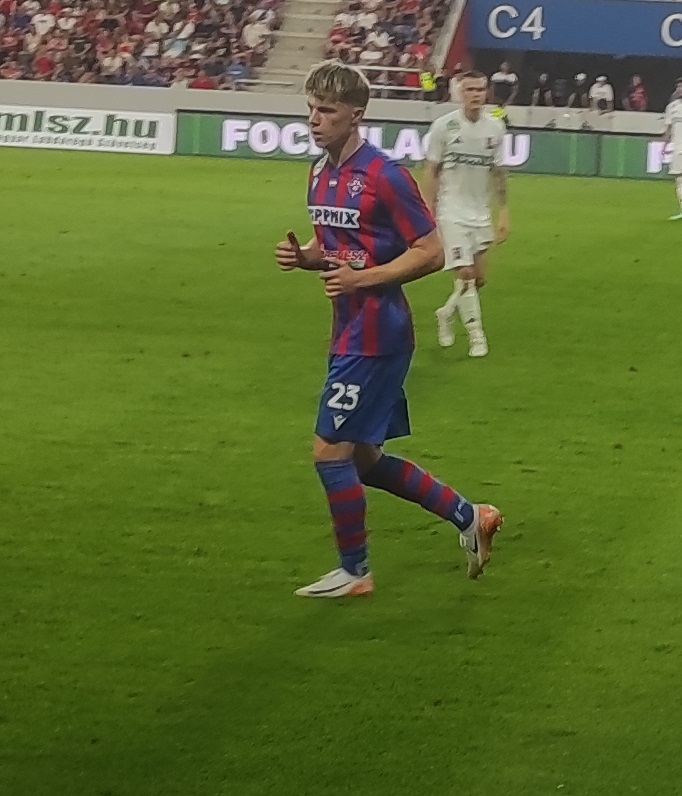
- Kovácsréti with Nyíregyháza in 2024

Personal information
- Date of birth: 1 September 2000 (age 26)
- Place of birth: Budapest, Hungary
- Height: 1.86 m (6 ft 1 in)
- Position: Left winger

Team information
- Current team: Nyíregyháza
- Number: 23

Youth career
- 2006–2013: Újpest
- 2013–2015: Vasas
- 2015–2017: Ferencváros

Senior career*
Years	Team	Apps	(Gls)
2017–2021	Kisvárda	52	(3)
2020	→ Nyíregyháza (loan)	5	(0)
2021–2023	MTK	32	(4)
2023–	Nyíregyháza	90	(16)

International career^{‡}
2016	Hungary U-17	1	(0)
2019–2021	Hungary U-21	5	(0)
- * Club domestic league appearances and goals as of 30 May 2026 ‡ National team caps and goals as of 24 March 2021

Márk Kovácsréti (born 1 September 2000) is a Hungarian professional footballer who plays for Nyíregyháza.

== Club career ==
On 25 January 2023, Kovácsréti returned to Nyíregyháza.

== Career statistics ==
As of 15 May 2021.

Appearances and goals by club, season and competition
Club	Season	League			Cup		Continental		Other		Total	
Club	Season	Division	Apps	Goals	Apps	Goals	Apps	Goals	Apps	Goals	Apps	Goals
Kisvárda	2017–18	Nemzeti Bajnokság II	3	1	1	0	—		0	0	4	1
Kisvárda	2018–19	Nemzeti Bajnokság I	0	0	4	0	—		0	0	4	0
Kisvárda	2019–20	Nemzeti Bajnokság I	23	1	2	0	—		0	0	25	1
Kisvárda	2020–21	Nemzeti Bajnokság I	26	1	6	3	—		0	0	32	4
Kisvárda	Total		52	3	13	3	0	0	0	0	65	6
Career total			52	3	13	3	0	0	0	0	65	6
