= Zalán Vancsa =

Hungarian footballer (born 2004)

Personal information
- Full name: Zalán Vancsa
- Date of birth: 27 October 2004 (age 22)
- Place of birth: Budapest, Hungary
- Height: 1.75 m (5 ft 9 in)
- Position: Forward

Team information
- Current team: IK Sirius
- Number: 30

Youth career
- 2011–2015: Ferencváros
- 2015–2019: MTK Budapest
- 2019–2020: Vasas

Senior career*
Years	Team	Apps	(Gls)
2020–2022	MTK Budapest	13	(1)
2022–2026	Lommel	80	(14)
2022	→ MTK Budapest (loan)	9	(0)
2024	→ Gent (loan)	2	(0)
2025	→ Roda JC (loan)	13	(0)
2026–	IK Sirius	4	(0)

International career^{‡}
2018–2019	Hungary U15	5	(2)
2019–2020	Hungary U16	8	(1)
2022–2023	Hungary U19	8	(2)
2022–	Hungary U21	22	(1)
2022–	Hungary	2	(0)
- * Club domestic league appearances and goals as of 19 September 2026 ‡ National team caps and goals as of 31 March 2026

Zalán Vancsa (born 27 October 2004) is a Hungarian professional footballer who plays as a left winger for Allsvenskan club IK Sirius and the Hungary national team.

== Career ==
=== MTK ===
He debuted in MTK Budapest FC in a 3–1 victory over Újpest FC in the 2020–21 Nemzeti Bajnokság I season on 24 April 2021. On 22 August 2021, he scored his first goal against Újpest at the Szusza Ferenc Stadion in the 92nd minute in the 2021-22 Nemzeti Bajnokság I season. He became the youngest player to score a goal in the Nemzeti Bajnokság I.

=== Lommel ===
On 31 January 2022, he was signed by City Football Group-owned Challenger Pro League club Lommel S.K.

==== 2022–23 season ====
He made his debut for Lommel against Dender E.H. in a 4–1 victory in the 2022–23 Challenger Pro League on 12 August 2022. On 9 September 2022, he played his first match in the 2022–23 Belgian Cup against S.V. Zulte Waregem. In the season, he made 23 appearances. On 21 April 2023, he scored his first goal against the reserves team of K.R.C. Genk.

==== 2023–24 season ====
On 13 August 2023, he made his first appearance and also scored the winning goal in a 1–0 away victory against K.V. Oostende in the 2023–24 Challenger Pro League. On 20 October 2022, he scored against Beerschot A.C. in a 2–1 defeat. On 26 January 2024, he scored a goal in a 4–0 victory over Standard Liège II on game week 19 of the 2023–24 Challenger Pro League.

==== Loan to Gent ====
On 4 September 2024, Vancsa joined Gent in Belgian Pro League on loan with an option to buy.

==== Loan to Roda JC ====
On 4 February 2025, Vancsa joined Eerste Divisie club Roda JC Kerkrade on loan for the remainder of the 2024–25 season. He left the club upon the expiry of his loan at the end of the season.

=== Sirius ===
On 30 August 2026, Vancsa signed for Allsvenskan club IK Sirius on a contract running to summer of 2031.

== International career ==
Having represented Hungary at youth international level, Vancsa made his debut for the senior side in June 2022, coming on as a late substitute during a 2–1 loss to Italy in the UEFA Nations League.

== Career statistics ==
=== Club ===
As of match played 9 May 2025

Appearances and goals by club, season and competition
Club	Season	League			Cup		Continental		Other		Total	
Club	Season	Division	Apps	Goals	Apps	Goals	Apps	Goals	Apps	Goals	Apps	Goals
MTK Budapest	2020–21	Nemzeti Bajnokság I	3	0	0	0	—		0	0	3	0
MTK Budapest	2021–22	Nemzeti Bajnokság I	10	1	2	1	—		0	0	12	2
MTK Budapest	Total		13	1	2	1	0	0	0	0	15	2
Lommel	2022–23	Challenger Pro League	23	1	1	0	—		0	0	24	1
Lommel	2023–24	Challenger Pro League	34	13	0	0	—		0	0	34	13
Lommel	Total		57	14	1	0	0	0	0	0	58	14
MTK Budapest (loan)	2021–22	Nemzeti Bajnokság I	9	0	—		—		—		9	0
Gent (loan)	2024–25	Belgian Pro League	2	0	1	0	0	0	0	0	3	0
Roda JC (loan)	2024–25	Eerste Divisie	13	0	0	0	—		—		13	0
Career total			94	15	4	1	0	0	0	0	98	16

=== International ===
As of match played 26 March 2024

Appearances and goals by national team and year
National team	Year	Apps	Goals
Hungary	2022	1	0
Hungary	2024	1	0
Total		2	0

== Personal life ==
Zalán's father, Miklós Vancsa, is also a footballer. In an interview with RTL Hungary, he said that he moved to Belgium alone.
