= János Szépe =

Slovak footballer

Personal information
- Date of birth: 15 March 1996 (age 30)
- Place of birth: Galanta, Slovakia
- Height: 1.88 m (6 ft 2 in)
- Position: Defender

Team information
- Current team: MTK
- Number: 3

Youth career
- –2015: TJ Družstevník Trstice
- 2011–2013: → Galanta (loan)
- 2013: → DAC Dunajská Streda (loan)
- 2014: → Slovan Bratislava (loan)
- 2014–2015: → DAC Dunajská Streda (loan)
- 2015: DAC Dunajská Streda

Senior career*
Years	Team	Apps	(Gls)
2016–2017	Dunajská Streda	4	(0)
2017–2018	Mosonmagyaróvár	33	(3)
2018–2021	Zalaegerszeg	45	(4)
2021–2022	Mezőkövesd	9	(0)
2022–2023	MTK	48	(2)
2023–2025	Győr	58	(7)
2025–	MTK	19	(0)
- * Club domestic league appearances and goals as of 30 May 2026

János Szépe (born 15 March 1996) is a Slovak footballer who plays as a defender for Nemzeti Bajnokság I club MTK.

== Club career ==
He made his professional Fortuna Liga debut for FC DAC 1904 Dunajská Streda against MFK Ružomberok on 20 May 2016.

On 12 January 2022, Szépe joined MTK.

== Career statistics ==
As of 27 June 2020.

Appearances and goals by club, season and competition
Club	Season	League			Cup		Continental		Other		Total	
Club	Season	Division	Apps	Goals	Apps	Goals	Apps	Goals	Apps	Goals	Apps	Goals
Mosonmagyaróvár	2017–18	Nemzeti Bajnokság II	33	3	0	0	—		—		33	3
Mosonmagyaróvár	Total		33	3	0	0	0	0	0	0	33	0
Zalaegerszeg	2018–19	Nemzeti Bajnokság II	10	0	0	0	—		—		10	0
Zalaegerszeg	2019–20	Nemzeti Bajnokság I	15	0	4	1	—		—		19	1
Zalaegerszeg	Total		25	0	4	1	0	0	0	0	29	1
Career total			58	3	4	1	0	0	0	0	62	4
