= Milan Mijatović =

Montenegrin footballer (born 1987)

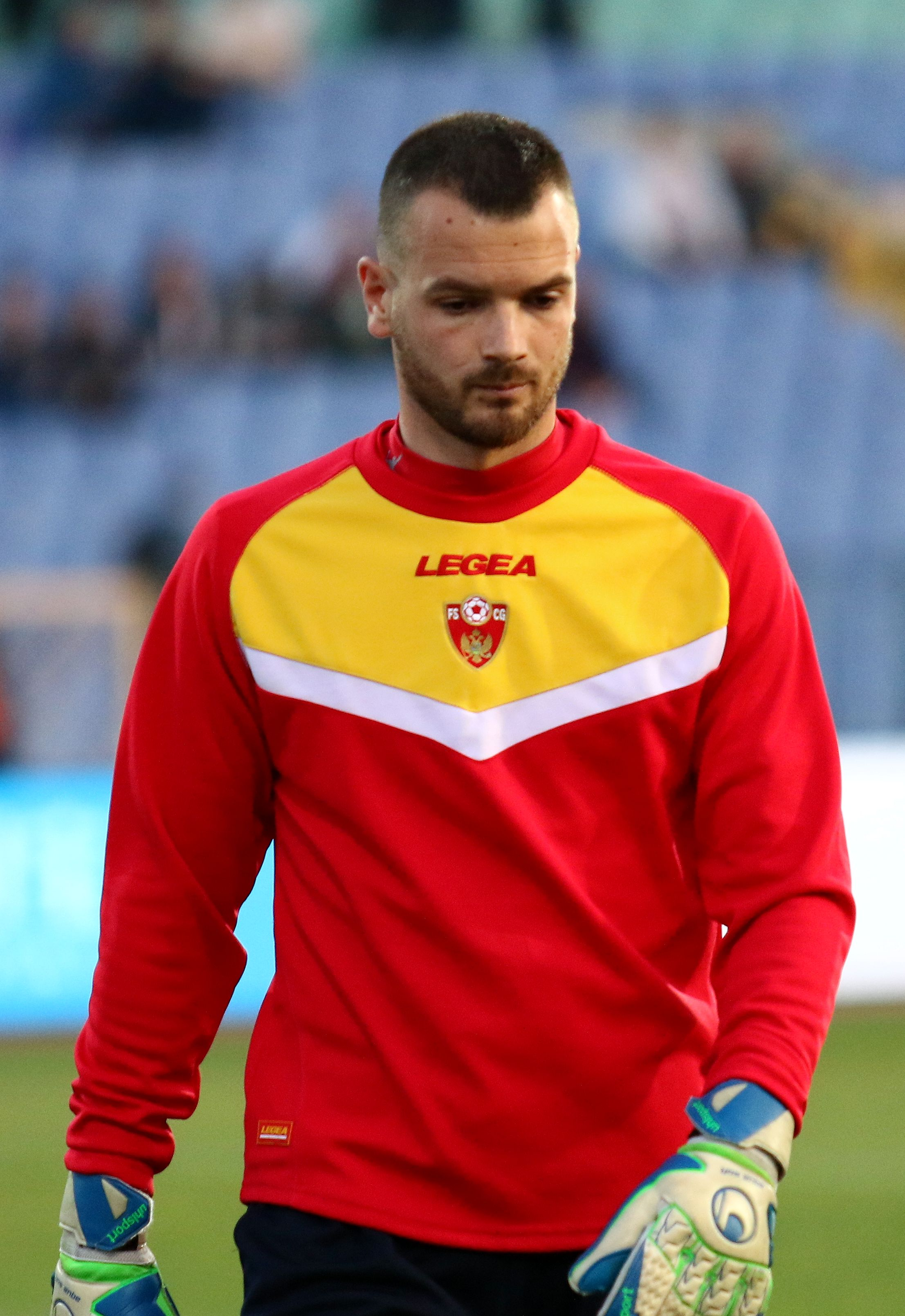
- Mijatović with Montenegro in 2019

Personal information
- Date of birth: 26 July 1987 (age 39)
- Place of birth: Pljevlja, SR Montenegro, SFR Yugoslavia
- Height: 1.90 m (6 ft 3 in)
- Position: Goalkeeper

Team information
- Current team: Budućnost
- Number: 1

Senior career*
Years	Team	Apps	(Gls)
2006–2012	Rudar Pljevlja	82	(0)
2012–2013	Mes Kerman	11	(0)
2013–2014	Zob Ahan	21	(0)
2014–2016	Bokelj	63	(0)
2016–2017	Dečić	32	(0)
2017–2019	Budućnost	68	(0)
2019–2020	Levski Sofia	26	(0)
2020–2022	MTK Budapest	62	(0)
2022–2023	Al-Adalah	30	(0)
2023	Borac Banja Luka	14	(0)
2024	Železničar Pančevo	20	(0)
2024–	Budućnost	52	(0)

International career^{‡}
2015–	Montenegro	40	(0)
- * Club domestic league appearances and goals as of 17 June 2026 ‡ National team caps and goals as of 9 September 2024

Milan Mijatović (Serbian Cyrillic: Милан Мијатовић, pronounced [mǐlan mîjaːtoʋitɕ, - mijǎː-]; born 26 July 1987) is a Montenegrin professional footballer who plays as a goalkeeper for Budućnost and the Montenegro national team.

== Club career ==
He began his professional career at Rudar Pljevlja where he made his senior debut playing in the Montenegrin First League in the 2009–10 season.

On the 18th of June 2019 he signed a 1+1 year contract with Bulgarian side Levski Sofia. He immediately established himself as the first choice goalkeeper. He kept 13 clean sheets for the team and made some amazing saves.

On 28 June 2020, he played the full 90 minutes in the 2:1 away win over Beroe in a First League game, which had been announced beforehand to be his last match for the "bluemen". After the game, Mijatović expressed his regret for leaving the club, noting that he wasn't offered a contract because of the financial uncertainty of the club. He also announced that he is to sign and play for MTK Budapest.

On 30 June 2022, Mijatović joined Saudi Arabian club Al-Adalah.

On 7 August 2023, Mijatović joined Borac Banja Luka.

== International career ==
On 12 October 2015, Mijatović made his senior international debut for Montenegro in a game against Russia.

== Career statistics ==
=== Club ===
As of match played 8 July 2025

Appearances and goals by club, season and competition
Club	Season	League			Cup		Continental		Other		Total	
Club	Season	Division	Apps	Goals	Apps	Goals	Apps	Goals	Apps	Goals	Apps	Goals
Rudar Pljevlja	2007–08	Montenegrin First League	16	0	0	0	2	0	—		32	0
Rudar Pljevlja	2008–09	Montenegrin First League	0	0	0	0	—		—		6	0
Rudar Pljevlja	2009–10	Montenegrin First League	6	0	0	0	—		—		6	0
Rudar Pljevlja	2010–11	Montenegrin First League	28	0	5	0	0	0	—		33	0
Rudar Pljevlja	2011–12	Montenegrin First League	32	0	4	0	1	0	—		37	0
Rudar Pljevlja	Total		82	0	9	0	3	0	—		94	0
Mes Kerman	2012–13	Persian Gulf Pro League	11	0	0	0	—		—		11	0
Zob Ahan	2013–14	Persian Gulf Pro League	21	0	0	0	—		—		21	0
Bokelj	2014–15	Montenegrin First League	32	0	0	0	—		—		32	0
Bokelj	2015–16	Montenegrin First League	31	0	4	0	—		—		35	0
Bokelj	2016–17	Montenegrin First League	—		—		2	0	—		2	0
Bokelj	Total		63	0	4	0	2	0	—		69	0
Dečić	2016–17	Montenegrin First League	32	0	3	0	—		—		35	0
Budućnost	2017–18	Montenegrin First League	35	0	4	0	2	0	—		41	0
Budućnost	2018–19	Montenegrin First League	33	0	0	0	2	0	—		35	0
Budućnost	Total		68	0	4	0	4	0	—		76	0
Levski Sofia	2019–20	Bulgarian First League	26	0	3	0	4	0	—		33	0
MTK Budapest	2020–21	NB I	32	0	0	0	—		—		32	0
MTK Budapest	2021–22	NB I	30	0	0	0	—		—		30	0
MTK Budapest	Total		62	0	0	0	—		—		62	0
Al-Adalah	2022–23	Saudi Pro League	30	0	1	0	—		—		31	0
Borac Banja Luka	2023–24	Bosnian Premier League	14	0	0	0	—		—		14	0
Železničar Pančevo	2023–24	Serbian SuperLiga	18	0	—		—		2	0	20	0
Budućnost	2024–25	Montenegrin First League	30	0	1	0	4	0	—		35	0
Budućnost	2025–26	Montenegrin First League	0	0	0	0	1	0	—		1	0
Budućnost	Total		30	0	1	0	5	0	—		36	0
Career total			457	0	25	0	18	0	2	0	502	0

=== International ===
As of match played 9 September 2024

Appearances and goals by national team and year
National team	Year	Apps	Goals
Montenegro	2015	1	0
Montenegro	2016	1	0
Montenegro	2017	0	0
Montenegro	2018	2	0
Montenegro	2019	5	0
Montenegro	2020	6	0
Montenegro	2021	6	0
Montenegro	2022	7	0
Montenegro	2023	8	0
Montenegro	2024	4	0
Montenegro	2025	0	0
Total		40	0

== Honours ==
Rudar Pljevlja

- Montenegrin First League: 2009–10
- Montenegrin Cup: 2009–10, 2010–11

Montenegro

- UEFA Nations League: First Group 1 League C 2020–21
