= Barnabás Biben =

Hungarian footballer

Personal information
- Full name: László Barnabás Biben
- Date of birth: 19 November 2003 (age 22)
- Place of birth: Budapest, Hungary
- Height: 1.82 m (6 ft 0 in)
- Position: Midfielder

Team information
- Current team: MTK Budapest
- Number: 30

Youth career
- 2011–2016: Vasas
- 2016-2019: Puskás Akadémia
- 2019–2020: MTK Budapest

Senior career*
Years	Team	Apps	(Gls)
2020–	MTK Budapest	18	(0)
2021	→ III. Kerület (loan)	1	(0)
2021–2022	→ Szentlőrinc (loan)	30	(0)
2023	→ Tiszakécske (loan)	14	(2)

International career^{‡}
2021–	Hungary U-19	9	(1)
- * Club domestic league appearances and goals as of 20 December 2023 ‡ National team caps and goals as of 29 March 2022

Barnabás Biben (born 19 November 2003) is a Hungarian professional footballer who plays for MTK Budapest.

== Career statistics ==
As of 15 May 2021.

Appearances and goals by club, season and competition
Club	Season	League			Cup		Other		Total	
Club	Season	Division	Apps	Goals	Apps	Goals	Apps	Goals	Apps	Goals
MTK Budapest	2020–21	Nemzeti Bajnokság I	11	0	3	0	0	0	14	0
III. Kerület	2021–22	Nemzeti Bajnokság II	1	0	0	0	0	0	1	0
Szentlőrinc	2021–22	Nemzeti Bajnokság II	9	0	1	0	0	0	10	0
Career total			21	0	4	0	0	0	25	0
