= Bence Somodi =

Hungarian footballer

Personal information
- Full name: Bence Máté Somodi
- Date of birth: 25 November 1988 (age 37)
- Place of birth: Eger, Hungary
- Height: 1.87 m (6 ft 2 in)
- Position: Goalkeeper

Team information
- Current team: Csákvár
- Number: 88

Youth career
- 1999–2005: Ferencváros
- 2005–2007: Blackburn

Senior career*
| Years | Team | Apps | (Gls) |
| 2007–2008 | Ferencváros | 0 | (0) |
| 2008 | Vecsés | 15 | (0) |
| 2008–2010 | Diósgyőr | 2 | (0) |
| 2009 | → Győr II (loan) | 4 | (0) |
| 2010–2011 | Kazincbarcika | 14 | (0) |
| 2010–2011 | → Videoton II (loan) | 39 | (0) |
| 2011–2013 | Videoton | 0 | (0) |
| 2012 | → Gyirmót (loan) | 14 | (0) |
| 2013–2014 | Puskás Akadémia | 22 | (0) |
| 2014–2017 | Kaposvári | 54 | (0) |
| 2017–2019 | Kazincbarcikai | 69 | (0) |
| 2019–2023 | MTK Budapest | 42 | (0) |
| 2023– | Csákvár | 0 | (0) |
- * Club domestic league appearances and goals as of 16 September 2023

Bence Máté Somodi (born 25 November 1988) is a Hungarian professional footballer who plays for Csákvár.

== Career statistics ==
Appearances and goals by club, season and competition
| Club | Season | League | | Cup | | League Cup | | Europe | | Total | |
| Club | Season | Apps | Goals | Apps | Goals | Apps | Goals | Apps | Goals | Apps | Goals |
|---|---|---|---|---|---|---|---|---|---|---|---|
Vecsés
| Vecsés | 2007–08 | 15 | 0 | 0 | 0 | – | – | – | – | 15 | 0 |
| Vecsés | Total | 15 | 0 | 0 | 0 | 0 | 0 | 0 | 0 | 15 | 0 |
Győr II
| Győr II | 2008–09 | 4 | 0 | 0 | 0 | – | – | – | – | 4 | 0 |
| Győr II | Total | 4 | 0 | 0 | 0 | 0 | 0 | 0 | 0 | 4 | 0 |
Diósgyőr
| Diósgyőr | 2008–09 | 0 | 0 | 0 | 0 | 2 | 0 | – | – | 2 | 0 |
| Diósgyőr | 2009–10 | 2 | 0 | 2 | 0 | 6 | 0 | – | – | 10 | 0 |
| Diósgyőr | Total | 2 | 0 | 2 | 0 | 8 | 0 | 0 | 0 | 12 | 0 |
Kazincbarcika
| Kazincbarcika | 2009–10 | 14 | 0 | 0 | 0 | – | – | – | – | 14 | 0 |
| Kazincbarcika | 2016–17 | 14 | 0 | 0 | 0 | – | – | – | – | 14 | 0 |
| Kazincbarcika | 2017–18 | 32 | 0 | 0 | 0 | – | – | – | – | 32 | 0 |
| Kazincbarcika | 2018–19 | 23 | 0 | 0 | 0 | – | – | – | – | 23 | 0 |
| Kazincbarcika | Total | 83 | 0 | 0 | 0 | 0 | 0 | 0 | 0 | 83 | 0 |
Puskás Akadémia
| Puskás Akadémia | 2010–11 | 30 | 0 | 1 | 0 | – | – | – | – | 31 | 0 |
| Puskás Akadémia | 2011–12 | 9 | 0 | 1 | 0 | – | – | – | – | 10 | 0 |
| Puskás Akadémia | 2012–13 | 14 | 0 | 0 | 0 | – | – | – | – | 14 | 0 |
| Puskás Akadémia | 2013–14 | 8 | 0 | 2 | 0 | 5 | 0 | – | – | 15 | 0 |
| Puskás Akadémia | Total | 61 | 0 | 4 | 0 | 5 | 0 | 0 | 0 | 70 | 0 |
Gyirmót
| Gyirmót | 2011–12 | 14 | 0 | 0 | 0 | – | – | – | – | 14 | 0 |
| Gyirmót | Total | 14 | 0 | 0 | 0 | 0 | 0 | 0 | 0 | 14 | 0 |
Videoton
| Videoton | 2011–12 | 0 | 0 | 0 | 0 | 1 | 0 | – | – | 1 | 0 |
| Videoton | 2012–13 | 0 | 0 | 0 | 0 | 4 | 0 | – | – | 4 | 0 |
| Videoton | Total | 0 | 0 | 0 | 0 | 5 | 0 | 0 | 0 | 5 | 0 |
Kaposvár
| Kaposvár | 2014–15 | 18 | 0 | 1 | 0 | 3 | 0 | – | – | 22 | 0 |
| Kaposvár | 2015–16 | 18 | 0 | 0 | 0 | – | – | – | – | 18 | 0 |
| Kaposvár | 2016–17 | 18 | 0 | 0 | 0 | – | – | – | – | 18 | 0 |
| Kaposvár | Total | 54 | 0 | 1 | 0 | 3 | 0 | 0 | 0 | 58 | 0 |
MTK Budapest
| MTK Budapest | 2019–20 | 21 | 0 | 0 | 0 | – | – | – | – | 21 | 0 |
| MTK Budapest | 2020–21 | 2 | 0 | 6 | 0 | – | – | – | – | 8 | 0 |
| MTK Budapest | Total | 23 | 0 | 6 | 0 | 0 | 0 | 0 | 0 | 29 | 0 |
| Career total | | 246 | 0 | 13 | 0 | 21 | 0 | 0 | 0 | 290 | 0 |

Updated to games played as of 15 May 2021.
