= Martin Palincsár =

Hungarian footballer

Personal information
- Date of birth: 3 January 1999 (age 27)
- Place of birth: Esztergom, Hungary
- Height: 1.76 m (5 ft 9 in)
- Position: Midfielder

Team information
- Current team: BVSC
- Number: 88

Youth career
- 2006–2007: Újpest
- 2007–2010: Dalnoki Akadémia
- 2010–2017: MTK Budapest

Senior career*
Years	Team	Apps	(Gls)
2017–2023	MTK Budapest	77	(3)
2017	→ MTK Budapest II	12	(1)
2018	→ Budaörs (loan)	14	(1)
2018–2019	→ Monor (loan)	34	(6)
2023–2025	Szeged	50	(2)
2025–	BVSC	22	(0)

International career^{‡}
2014	Hungary U16	4	(0)
2015–2016	Hungary U17	8	(0)
2016–2017	Hungary U18	10	(3)
2017–2018	Hungary U19	4	(0)
2019–2021	Hungary U21	6	(0)
- * Club domestic league appearances and goals as of 31 May 2026 ‡ National team caps and goals as of 30 March 2021

Martin Palincsár (born 3 January 1999) is a Hungarian football player who plays for BVSC.

== Club career ==
He made his NB I debut for MTK Budapest on 14 August 2020 in a game against Ferencváros.

== Career statistics ==
As of 15 May 2021.

Appearances and goals by club, season and competition
Club	Season	League			Cup		Continental		Other		Total	
Club	Season	Division	Apps	Goals	Apps	Goals	Apps	Goals	Apps	Goals	Apps	Goals
MTK Budapest II	2017–18	Nemzeti Bajnokság III	12	1	—		—		0	0	12	1
MTK Budapest II	Total		12	1	0	0	0	0	0	0	12	1
Budaörs	2017–18	Nemzeti Bajnokság II	14	1	0	0	—		0	0	14	1
Budaörs	Total		14	1	0	0	0	0	0	0	14	1
Monor	2018–19	Nemzeti Bajnokság II	34	6	1	0	—		0	0	35	6
Monor	Total		34	6	1	0	0	0	0	0	35	6
MTK Budapest	2019–20	Nemzeti Bajnokság II	22	3	7	0	—		0	0	29	3
MTK Budapest	2020–21	Nemzeti Bajnokság I	19	0	5	0	—		0	0	24	0
MTK Budapest	Total		41	3	12	0	0	0	0	0	53	3
Career total			101	11	13	0	0	0	0	0	114	11
