= 2019–20 MTK Budapest FC season =

MTK Budapest FC
2019–20 season
- Chairman: Tamás Deutsch
- Manager: Michael Boris
- Stadium: Hidegkuti Nándor Stadion
- NB 2: Winner
- Hungarian Cup: Semi-final
- Top goalscorer: League: László Lencse (14); All: László Lencse (14)
- Highest home attendance: 1,983 vs Budafok (20 October 2019)
- Lowest home attendance: 1,329 vs Dorog (11 March 2020)
Home colours	Away colours

The 2019–20 season was MTK Budapest FC's 6th competitive season, 1st consecutive season in the Merkantil Bank Liga and 131st year in existence as a football club.

== First team ==
Note: Flags indicate national team as defined under FIFA eligibility rules; some limited exceptions apply. Players may hold more than one non-FIFA nationality.

No.	Pos.	Nation	Player
1	GK	HUN	Balázs Bese
2	DF	HUN	Benedek Varju
4	MF	HUN	Benjámin Cseke
5	DF	HUN	Zsombor Nagy
6	FW	HUN	István Szatmári
7	FW	HUN	Szabolcs Schön
8	MF	HUN	Szabolcs Mezei
9	MF	HUN	István Bognár
11	FW	HUN	Dániel Gera
13	MF	HUN	Miklós Szerencsi
14	MF	HUN	Mihály Kata
15	FW	HUN	Ákos Zuigéber

No.	Pos.	Nation	Player
17	FW	HUN	Dániel Prosser
18	FW	HUN	Bence Babinszky
19	MF	HUN	József Kanta (captain)
20	GK	HUN	Bence Varga
21	FW	HUN	Bence Bíró
22	MF	HUN	Máté Katona
23	DF	HUN	Noel Fülöp
25	GK	HUN	Bence Somodi
27	MF	HUN	Martin Palincsár
28	DF	HUN	Ádám Pintér
29	FW	HUN	László Lencse
77	DF	HUN	Ákos Baki

== Transfers ==
=== Summer ===
In: Note: Flags indicate national team as defined under FIFA eligibility rules; some limited exceptions apply. Players may hold more than one non-FIFA nationality.

No.	Pos.	Nation	Player
4	DF	SRB	Stefan Deak (from (Serbia) Napredak Kruševac)
4	MF	HUN	Benjámin Cseke (loan from Paks)
5	DF	HUN	Zsombor Nagy (from MTK Budapest U-19)
8	MF	HUN	Szabolcs Mezei (from MTK Budapest U-19)
13	MF	HUN	Miklós Szerencsi (from MTK Budapest U-19)
14	MF	HUN	Mihály Kata (from MTK Budapest U-19)
15	FW	HUN	Ákos Zuigéber (from MTK Budapest U-19)
16	FW	HUN	Péter Törőcsik (from MTK Budapest U-19)
16	GK	HUN	Patrik Demjén (loan return from Budaörs)
17	FW	HUN	András Simon (from Paks)
18	FW	HUN	Bence Babinszky (from MTK Budapest U-19)
23	DF	HUN	Noel Fülöp (from Monor)
23	DF	HUN	Attila Talabér (loan return from Vasas)
25	GK	HUN	Bence Somodi (from Kazincbarcika)
26	MF	HUN	Máté Kovács (from MTK Budapest U-19)
27	MF	HUN	Martin Palincsár (from MTK Budapest U-19)
27	FW	HUN	Szabolcs Varga (loan return from Vád)
99	FW	BRA	Myke Ramos (loan return from (United Arab Emirates) Al-Ittihad)
—	MF	HUN	István Szatmári (loan return from Békéscsaba)
—	DF	HUN	Norbert Farkas (loan return from Monor)
—	GK	HUN	Balázs Bese (loan return from Vasas)

Out: Note: Flags indicate national team as defined under FIFA eligibility rules; some limited exceptions apply. Players may hold more than one non-FIFA nationality.

No.	Pos.	Nation	Player
1	GK	UKR	Artem Kychak (to (Ukraine) Olimpik Donetsk)
4	DF	SRB	Stefan Deak (to Szeged)
5	DF	HUN	Béla Balogh (to BVSC Budapest)
6	MF	HUN	Bálint Vogyicska (to Gyirmót)
13	DF	HUN	Gergő Gengeliczki (to Győr)
14	FW	HUN	Sándor Torghelle (to Vasas)
16	GK	HUN	Patrik Demjén (to Zalaegerszeg)
17	MF	AUT	Slobodan Mihajlović (to (Austria) GAK)
18	FW	MLI	Ulysse Diallo (to (Azerbaijan) Sabah)
23	DF	HUN	Attila Talabér (to Szeged)
27	FW	HUN	Szabolcs Varga (to Szeged)
33	DF	UKR	Yevhen Selin (to (Cyprus) Anorthosis)
38	MF	HUN	Ádám Vass (to Gyirmót)
62	DF	GHA	Nasiru Banahene (loan to (Finland) Honka)
68	FW	HUN	Zoltán Tóth (loan to (Slovenia) Nafta)
70	FW	HUN	Tamás Kulcsár (to Budaörs)
71	MF	HUN	Anton Bidzilya (loan to Békéscsaba)
74	MF	HUN	Gergely Kapronczai (loan to III. Kerület)
88	DF	NGR	George Ikenne (loan to Budapest Honvéd)
98	GK	HUN	László Horváth (to Kazincbarcika)
99	FW	BRA	Myke Ramos
—	DF	HUN	Norbert Farkas (to Mosonmagyaróvár)

=== Winter ===
In: Note: Flags indicate national team as defined under FIFA eligibility rules; some limited exceptions apply. Players may hold more than one non-FIFA nationality.

No.	Pos.	Nation	Player
4	MF	HUN	Benjámin Cseke (from Paks)
17	FW	HUN	Dániel Prosser (from Diósgyőr)
21	FW	HUN	Bence Bíró (from (Portugal) Vitória B)

Out: Note: Flags indicate national team as defined under FIFA eligibility rules; some limited exceptions apply. Players may hold more than one non-FIFA nationality.

No.	Pos.	Nation	Player
13	MF	HUN	Miklós Szerencsi (loan to Monor)
17	MF	HUN	András Simon (to Győr)
62	DF	GHA	Nasiru Banahene (to (Finland) Honka)

== Nemzeti Bajnokság II ==
=== League table ===
Pos	Team	Pld	W	D	L	GF	GA	GD	Pts	Promotion or relegation
1	MTK Budapest (C, P)	27	18	5	4	60	33	+27	59	Promotion to Nemzeti Bajnokság I
2	Budafok (P)	27	16	6	5	42	23	+19	54	Promotion to Nemzeti Bajnokság I
3	Vasas	27	14	5	8	55	39	+16	47	
4	Csákvár	26	13	4	9	40	43	−3	43	
5	Siófok	26	11	9	6	40	31	+9	42	

Updated to match(es) played on 14 March 2020. Source:
Rules for classification: 1st points; 2nd overall wins; 3rd goal difference; 4th head-to-head points; 5th head-to-head goal difference; 6th head-to-head away goals scored; 7th fair-play points; 8th drawing of lots
(C) Champions; (P) Promoted

=== Results summary ===
Overall								Home						Away					
Pld	W	D	L	GF	GA	GD	Pts	W	D	L	GF	GA	GD	W	D	L	GF	GA	GD
27	18	5	4	60	33	+27	59	11	3	0	31	13	+18	7	2	4	29	20	+9

Last updated: 14 March 2020.
Source: NB2

=== Results by round ===
Round	1	2	3	4	5	6	7	8	9	10	11	12	13	14	15	16	17	18	19	20	21	22	23	24	25	26	27	28	29	30	31	32	33	34	35	36	37	38
Ground	A	H	A	H	A	H	A	H	A	H	A	A	H	A	H	A	H	A	H	H	A	H	A	H	A	H	A	H										
Result	L	D	W	W	D	D	W	W	W	W	L	W	W	X	W	W	W	D	W	W	W	W	W	D	L	W	L	W										
Position	13	12	7	3	6	8	5	5	4	1	3	2	1	3	3	1	1	1	1	1	1	1	1	1	1	1	1	1										

Updated to match(es) played on 14 March 2020. Source: Matches
A = Away; H = Home; W = Win; D = Draw; L = Loss

=== Matches ===
4 August 2019 1	Csákvár	3 – 2	MTK Budapest	Csákvár
19:00 CEST	Sejben 15'; Baracskai 29'; Kiprich 41' (pen.)	Report	Szatmári 22'; Bognár 60'	Stadium: Tersztyánszky Ödön Sportközpont; Attendance: 500; Referee: Attila Molnár

7 August 2019 2	MTK Budapest	1 – 1	Budaörs	Budapest
19:00 CEST	Babinszky 54'	Report	Molnár 44'	Stadium: Hidegkuti Nándor Stadion; Attendance: 1,650; Referee: Zoltán Iványi

11 August 2019 3	Dorog	0 – 4	MTK Budapest	Dorog
17:30 CEST		Report	Bognár 13'; Zuigéber 49', 64'; Lencse 58'	Stadium: Buzánszky Jenő Stadion; Attendance: 1,000; Referee: Gábor Oláh

18 August 2019 4	MTK Budapest	3 – 2	Soroksár	Budapest
18:00 CEST	Bognár 11', 46'; Vass 35'	Report	Huszák 83' (pen.); Lőrinczy 88'	Stadium: Hidegkuti Nándor Stadion; Attendance: 1,758; Referee: Sándor Andó-Szabó

25 August 2019 5	Békéscsaba	3 – 3	MTK Budapest	Békéscsaba
19:00 CEST	Szalai 21'; Kovács 35'; Király 65'	Report	Lencse 15'; Vass 59'; Simon 84'	Stadium: Kórház utcai Stadion; Attendance: 2,120; Referee: Róbert Nagy

28 August 2019 6	MTK Budapest	4 – 4	Ajka	Budapest
19:00 CEST	Schön 32'; Simon 35'; Szatmári 73'; Varju 90+1'	Report	Nagy 3'; Görgényi 19'; Soltész 42'; Stoiacovici 90+3'	Stadium: Hidegkuti Nándor Stadion; Attendance: 1,800; Referee: Gergely Szőts

1 September 2019 7	Tiszakécske	0 – 3	MTK Budapest	Tiszakécske
16:30 CEST		Report	Bognár 35'; Vass 51'; Lencse 70' (pen.)	Stadium: Városi Sportcentrum; Attendance: 850; Referee: Zoltán J. Kovács

15 September 2019 8	MTK Budapest	1 – 0	Kazincbarcika	Budapest
17:00 CEST	Bognár 36' (pen.)	Report		Stadium: Hidegkuti Nándor Stadion; Attendance: 1,895; Referee: Péter Zierkelbach

18 September 2019 9	Vasas	1 – 4	MTK Budapest	Budapest
18:00 CEST	Birtalan 78'	Report	Palincsár 70'; Vass 85', 90+5'; Katona 88'	Stadium: Illovszky Rudolf Stadion; Attendance: 2,500; Referee: Balázs Berke

29 September 2019 10	MTK Budapest	2 – 1	Nyíregyháza	Budapest
14:00 CEST	Lencse 25' (pen.); Schön 56'	Report	Jova 48' (pen.)	Stadium: Hidegkuti Nándor Stadion; Attendance: 1,946; Referee: Gábor Barna

27 November 2019 11	Győr	1 – 0	MTK Budapest	Győr
18:00 CET	Szánthó 25'	Report		Stadium: ETO Park; Attendance: 780; Referee: Péter Zierkelbach

6 October 2019 12	Vác	1 – 3	MTK Budapest	Balassagyarmat
15:00 CEST	Magos 3'	Report	Palincsár 15'; Nagy 83'; Simon 85'	Stadium: Ipolyparti Sporttelep; Attendance: 450; Referee: Tamás Móri

20 October 2019 13	MTK Budapest	2 – 1	Budafok	Budapest
18:00 CEST	Katona 19'; Lencse 73'	Report	Micsinai 7'	Stadium: Hidegkuti Nándor Stadion; Attendance: 1,983; Referee: János Takács

26 October 2019 14	Balmazújváros	–	MTK Budapest	Balmazújváros
17:00 CET		[ Report]		Stadium: Városi Sportpálya

3 November 2019 15	MTK Budapest	3 – 0	Szombathely	Budapest
17:00 CET	Kanta 74' (pen.); Szatmári 78'; Lencse 85'	Report		Stadium: Hidegkuti Nándor Stadion; Attendance: 1,852; Referee: Ádám Németh

6 November 2019 16	Gyirmót	1 – 2	MTK Budapest	Győr
18:00 CET	Májer 42'	Report	Lencse 29'; Baki 48'	Stadium: Alcufer Stadion; Attendance: 502; Referee: Gergő Bogár

10 November 2019 17	MTK Budapest	3 – 0	Siófok	Budapest
17:00 CET	Lencse 9'; Deutsch 36'; Vass 78'	Report		Stadium: Hidegkuti Nándor Stadion; Attendance: 1,651; Referee: Péter Antal

24 November 2019 18	Szeged	1 – 1	MTK Budapest	Szeged
17:00 CET	Gajdos 9'	Report	Lencse 43'	Stadium: Szent Gellért Fórum; Attendance: 4,000; Referee: Ádám Radványi

30 November 2019 19	MTK Budapest	1 – 0	Szolnok	Budapest
17:00 CET	Schön 56'	Report		Stadium: Hidegkuti Nándor Stadion; Attendance: 1,619; Referee: Tamás Takács

9 December 2019 20	MTK Budapest	3 – 0	Csákvár	Budapest
19:00 CET	Lencse 36', 86'; Schön 55'	Report		Stadium: Hidegkuti Nándor Stadion; Attendance: 1,465; Referee: Balázs Berke

15 December 2019 21	Budaörs	1 – 2	MTK Budapest	Tatabánya
13:00 CET	Stieber 24'	Report	Lencse 43'; Kanta 83'	Stadium: Városi Stadion; Attendance: 300; Referee: Marcell Derdák

2 February 2020 22	MTK Budapest	2 – 1	Dorog	Budapest
17:00 CET	Prosser 45', 65'	Report	Nyíri 76'	Stadium: Hidegkuti Nándor Stadion; Attendance: 1,801; Referee: József Ducsai

9 February 2020 23	Soroksár	3 – 4	MTK Budapest	Budapest
14:00 CET	Orosz 11', 71'; Lőrinczy 17'	Report	Palincsár 12'; Cseke 61'; Baki 86'; Prosser 90'	Stadium: Szamosi Mihály Sporttelep; Attendance: 800; Referee: Péter Antal

16 February 2020 24	MTK Budapest	1 – 1	Békéscsaba	Budapest
18:00 CET	Prosser 47'	Report	Pantović 36'	Stadium: Hidegkuti Nándor Stadion; Attendance: 1,706; Referee: Gábor Oláh

23 February 2020 25	Ajka	2 – 0	MTK Budapest	Ajka
17:00 CET	Nagy 74', 87'	Report		Stadium: Városi Stadion; Attendance: 1,700; Referee: Márió Görög

1 March 2020 26	MTK Budapest	2 – 1	Tiszakécske	Budapest
17:00 CET	Lencse 26'; Bognár 58'	Report	Gréczi 90+1' (pen.)	Stadium: Hidegkuti Nándor Stadion; Attendance: 1,683; Referee: Bence Hanyecz

8 March 2020 27	Kazincbarcika	3 – 1	MTK Budapest	Putnok
14:30 CET	Alan Kováč 20'; Mikló 80', 90+1'	Report	Lencse 55'	Stadium: Várady Béla Sportközpont; Attendance: 350; Referee: Tamás Takács

14 March 2020 28	MTK Budapest	3 – 1	Vasas	Budapest
17:00 CET	Cseke 62'; Prosser 64'; Baki 90+3'	Report	Vernes 63'	Stadium: Hidegkuti Nándor Stadion; Attendance: no specatators Referee: Gergő Bogár

30 June 2020 29	Nyíregyháza	–	MTK Budapest	Nyíregyháza
CEST		[ Report]		Stadium: Városi Stadion

30 June 2020 30	MTK Budapest	–	Győr	Budapest
CEST		[ Report]		Stadium: Hidegkuti Nándor Stadion

30 June 2020 31	MTK Budapest	–	Vác	Budapest
CEST		[ Report]		Stadium: Hidegkuti Nándor Stadion

30 June 2020 32	Budafok	–	MTK Budapest	Budapest
CEST		[ Report]		Stadium: Budafoki Sporttelep

30 June 2020 33	MTK Budapest	–	Balmazújváros	Budapest
CEST		[ Report]		Stadium: Hidegkuti Nándor Stadion

30 June 2020 34	Szombathely	–	MTK Budapest	Szombathely
CEST		[ Report]		Stadium: Haladás Sportkomplexum

30 June 2020 35	MTK Budapest	–	Gyirmót	Budapest
CEST		[ Report]		Stadium: Hidegkuti Nándor Stadion

30 June 2020 36	Siófok	–	MTK Budapest	Siófok
CEST		[ Report]		Stadium: Révész Géza utcai Stadion

30 June 2020 37	MTK Budapest	–	Szeged	Budapest
CEST		[ Report]		Stadium: Hidegkuti Nándor Stadion

30 June 2020 38	Szolnok	–	MTK Budapest	Szolnok
CEST		[ Report]		Stadium: Tiszaligeti Stadion

== Hungarian Cup ==
21 September 2019 6th round	Unione	0 – 1	MTK Budapest	Budapest
15:00 CEST		Report	Szatmári 53'	Stadium: Hévíz utcai Stadion; Attendance: 300; Referee: Anikó Kiss

30 October 2019 7th round	Debreceni EAC	0 – 3	MTK Budapest	Debrecen
12:30 CET		Report	Katona 57'; Nagy 62'; Szatmári 88'	Stadium: Egyetemi Sporttelep; Attendance: 800; Referee: Bence Hanyecz

3 December 2019 Round of 32	MTK Budapest	1 – 0 (a.e.t.)	Diósgyőr	Budapest
17:00 CET	Schön 98'	Report		Stadium: Hidegkuti Nándor Stadion; Attendance: 1,882; Referee: Gábor Barna

12 February 2020 Round of 16 (1st leg)	MTK Budapest	3 – 0	Dunaújváros	Budapest
18:00 CET	Bognár 18'; Bíró 27', 77'	Report		Stadium: Hidegkuti Nándor Stadion; Attendance: 1,568; Referee: Márton Rúsz

19 February 2020 Round of 16 (2nd leg)	Dunaújváros	0 – 2 (0 – 5 agg.)	MTK Budapest	Dunaújváros
18:00 CET		Report	Bíró 34'; Gera 64'	Stadium: Dunaferr Arena; Attendance: 200; Referee: Attila Molnár

4 March 2020 Quarter-final (1st leg)	Dorog	0 – 1	MTK Budapest	Dorog
14:30 CET		Report	Bognár 27'	Stadium: Buzánszky Jenő Stadion; Attendance: 750; Referee: Péter Antal

11 March 2020 Quarter-final (2nd leg)	MTK Budapest	3 – 0 (4 – 0 agg.)	Dorog	Budapest
18:00 CET	Cseke 23'; Kanta 33' (pen.); Prosser 86'	Report		Stadium: Hidegkuti Nándor Stadion; Attendance: 1,329; Referee: Sándor Szilágyi

23 May 2020 Semi-final (1st leg)	MTK Budapest	0 – 0	Budapest Honvéd	Budapest
20:05 CEST		Report		Stadium: Hidegkuti Nándor Stadion; Attendance: no spectators Referee: József Erdős

26 May 2020 Semi-final (2nd leg)	Budapest Honvéd	0 – 0 (a.e.t.) (0 – 0 agg.) (5 – 4 p)	MTK Budapest	Budapest
18:00 CEST		Report		Stadium: Puskás Aréna; Attendance: no spectators Referee: Péter Solymosi
	Penalties
	Lovrić (penalty scored); Szendrei (penalty scored); Moutari (penalty scored); Uzoma (penalty missed); Kukoč (penalty scored); Hidi (penalty scored)		(penalty missed) Kanta; (penalty scored) Pintér; (penalty scored) Prosser; (penalty scored) Bognár; (penalty scored) Cseke; (penalty missed) Gera

== Statistics ==
=== Appearances and goals ===
Last updated on 26 May 2020.

No.	Pos	Nat	Player	Total		Merkantil Bank Liga		Hungarian Cup	
No.	Pos	Nat	Player	Apps	Goals	Apps	Goals	Apps	Goals
1	GK	(Hungary) HUN	Balázs Bese	5	-10	5	-10	0	0
2	DF	(Hungary) HUN	Benedek Varju	25	1	19	1	6	0
3	DF	(Hungary) HUN	Bence Deutsch	15	1	11	1	4	0
4	MF	(Hungary) HUN	Benjámin Cseke	25	3	17	2	8	1
5	DF	(Hungary) HUN	Zsombor Nagy	27	2	19	1	8	1
6	FW	(Hungary) HUN	István Szatmári	13	5	10	3	3	2
7	MF	(Hungary) HUN	Szabolcs Schön	25	5	17	4	8	1
8	MF	(Hungary) HUN	Szabolcs Mezei	31	0	24	0	7	0
9	MF	(Hungary) HUN	István Bognár	22	9	16	7	6	2
10	MF	(Hungary) HUN	Patrik Vass	21	6	19	6	2	0
11	MF	(Hungary) HUN	Dániel Gera	8	1	4	0	4	1
13	MF	(Hungary) HUN	Miklós Szerencsi	6	0	4	0	2	0
14	MF	(Hungary) HUN	Mihály Kata	23	0	19	0	4	0
15	FW	(Hungary) HUN	Ákos Zuigéber	4	2	4	2	0	0
17	MF	(Hungary) HUN	Dániel Prosser	12	6	7	5	5	1
18	FW	(Hungary) HUN	Bence Babinszky	5	1	4	1	1	0
19	MF	(Hungary) HUN	József Kanta	18	3	11	2	7	1
20	GK	(Hungary) HUN	Bence Varga	10	-1	1	-1	9	0
21	FW	(Hungary) HUN	Bence Bíró	12	3	6	0	6	3
22	MF	(Hungary) HUN	Máté Katona	34	3	25	2	9	1
23	DF	(Hungary) HUN	Noel Fülöp	29	0	20	0	9	0
25	GK	(Hungary) HUN	Bence Somodi	21	-22	21	-22	0	0
27	MF	(Hungary) HUN	Martin Palincsár	29	3	22	3	7	0
28	DF	(Hungary) HUN	Ádám Pintér	24	0	20	0	4	0
29	FW	(Hungary) HUN	László Lencse	32	14	27	14	5	0
77	DF	(Hungary) HUN	Ákos Baki	11	3	8	3	3	0
Youth players:
16	FW	(Hungary) HUN	Péter Törőcsik	1	0	0	0	1	0
26	MF	(Hungary) HUN	Máté Kovács	1	0	0	0	1	0
Players no longer at the club:
4	DF	(Serbia) SRB	Stefan Deak	1	0	1	0	0	0
17	MF	(Hungary) HUN	András Simon	17	3	16	3	1	0

=== Top scorers ===
Includes all competitive matches. The list is sorted by shirt number when total goals are equal.

Last updated on 26 May 2020

Position	Nation	Number	Name	Merkantil Bank Liga	Hungarian Cup	Total
1	(Hungary)	29	László Lencse	14	0	14
2	(Hungary)	9	István Bognár	7	2	9
3	(Hungary)	10	Patrik Vass	6	0	6
4	(Hungary)	17	Dániel Prosser	5	1	6
5	(Hungary)	7	Szabolcs Schön	4	1	5
6	(Hungary)	6	István Szatmári	3	2	5
7	(Hungary)	17	András Simon	3	0	3
8	(Hungary)	27	Martin Palincsár	3	0	3
9	(Hungary)	77	Ákos Baki	3	0	3
10	(Hungary)	22	Máté Katona	2	1	3
11	(Hungary)	19	József Kanta	2	1	3
12	(Hungary)	4	Benjámin Cseke	2	1	3
13	(Hungary)	21	Bence Bíró	0	3	3
14	(Hungary)	15	Ákos Zuigéber	2	0	2
15	(Hungary)	5	Zsombor Nagy	1	1	2
16	(Hungary)	18	Bence Babinszky	1	0	1
17	(Hungary)	2	Benedek Varju	1	0	1
18	(Hungary)	3	Bence Deutsch	1	0	1
19	(Hungary)	11	Dániel Gera	0	1	1
/	/	/	Own Goals	0	0	0
			TOTALS	60	14	74

=== Disciplinary record ===
Includes all competitive matches. Players with 1 card or more included only.

Last updated on 26 May 2020

Position	Nation	Number	Name	Merkantil Bank Liga		Hungarian Cup		Total (Hu Total)	
Position	Nation	Number	Name	Yellow card	Red card	Yellow card	Red card	Yellow card	Red card
DF	(Hungary)	2	Benedek Varju	3	0	2	0	5 (3)	0 (0)
DF	(Hungary)	3	Bence Deutsch	1	0	0	0	1 (1)	0 (0)
MF	(Hungary)	4	Benjámin Cseke	1	0	0	0	1 (1)	0 (0)
DF	(Serbia)	4	Stefan Deak	0	1	0	0	0 (0)	1 (1)
DF	(Hungary)	5	Zsombor Nagy	0	0	1	0	3 (2)	0 (0)
FW	(Hungary)	6	István Szatmári	0	0	1	0	1 (0)	0 (0)
MF	(Hungary)	8	Szabolcs Mezei	3	0	0	0	3 (3)	0 (0)
MF	(Hungary)	9	István Bognár	2	0	1	0	3 (2)	0 (0)
MF	(Hungary)	10	Patrik Vass	1	0	0	0	1 (1)	0 (0)
MF	(Hungary)	13	Miklós Szerencsi	1	0	0	0	1 (1)	0 (0)
MF	(Hungary)	14	Mihály Kata	3	0	0	0	3 (3)	0 (0)
FW	(Hungary)	15	Ákos Zuigéber	1	0	0	0	1 (1)	0 (0)
MF	(Hungary)	17	András Simon	2	0	0	0	2 (2)	0 (0)
FW	(Hungary)	18	Bence Babinszky	1	0	0	0	1 (1)	0 (0)
MF	(Hungary)	19	József Kanta	1	0	0	0	1 (1)	0 (0)
FW	(Hungary)	21	Bence Bíró	0	0	1	0	1 (0)	0 (0)
MF	(Hungary)	22	Máté Katona	5	0	1	0	6 (5)	0 (0)
DF	(Hungary)	23	Noel Fülöp	2	0	0	0	2 (2)	0 (0)
GK	(Hungary)	25	Bence Somodi	2	0	0	0	2 (2)	0 (0)
MF	(Hungary)	27	Máté Palincsár	3	0	1	0	4 (3)	0 (0)
DF	(Hungary)	28	Ádám Pintér	4	0	0	0	4 (4)	0 (0)
FW	(Hungary)	29	László Lencse	4	0	0	0	4 (4)	0 (0)
DF	(Hungary)	77	Ákos Baki	4	1	0	0	4 (4)	1 (1)
			TOTALS	44	2	8	0	52 (44)	2 (2)

=== Overall ===
Games played	36 (27 Merkantil Bank Liga and 9 Hungarian Cup)
Games won	25 (18 Merkantil Bank Liga and 7 Hungarian Cup)
Games drawn	7 (5 Merkantil Bank Liga and 2 Hungarian Cup)
Games lost	4 (4 Merkantil Bank Liga and 0 Hungarian Cup)
Goals scored	74
Goals conceded	33
Goal difference	+41
Yellow cards	52
Red cards	2
Worst discipline	(Hungary) Ákos Baki (4 (yellow card) , 1 (red card) )
Worst discipline	(Hungary) Máté Katona (6 (yellow card) , 0 (red card) )
Best result	4–0 (A) v Dorog - Nemzeti Bajnokság II - 11-08-2019
Worst result	0–2 (A) v Ajka - Nemzeti Bajnokság II - 23-02-2020
Worst result	1–3 (A) v Kazincbarcika - Nemzeti Bajnokság II - 08-03-2020
Most appearances	(Hungary) Máté Katona (35 appearances)
Top scorer	(Hungary) László Lencse (14 goals)
Points	82/108 (75.92%)

Last updated: 26 May 2020
