= 2018–19 MTK Budapest FC season =

MTK Budapest FC
2018–19 season
- Chairman: Tamás Deutsch
- Manager: Tamás Feczkó
- NB 1: 11th (relegated)
- Hungarian Cup: round of 32
- Top goalscorer: League: Sándor Torghelle (7); All: Dániel Gera (8); Sándor Torghelle (8)
- Highest home attendance: 4,587 vs Ferencváros (9 March 2019)
- Lowest home attendance: 1,381 vs Paks (2 February 2019)
Home colours	Away colours

The 2018–19 season was MTK Budapest FC's 117th competitive season, 1st consecutive season in the OTP Bank Liga and 130th year in existence as a football club.

== First team squad ==
Note: Flags indicate national team as defined under FIFA eligibility rules; some limited exceptions apply. Players may hold more than one non-FIFA nationality.

No.	Pos.	Nation	Player
1	GK	UKR	Artem Kychak
3	DF	HUN	Bence Deutsch
5	DF	HUN	Béla Balogh
6	MF	HUN	Bálint Vogyicska
7	FW	HUN	Balázs Farkas
8	MF	HUN	András Schäfer
9	MF	HUN	István Bognár
10	MF	HUN	Patrik Vass
11	FW	HUN	Dániel Gera
13	DF	HUN	Gergő Gengeliczki
14	FW	HUN	Sándor Torghelle
17	MF	HUN	Kevin Korozmán

No.	Pos.	Nation	Player
19	MF	HUN	József Kanta (captain)
20	GK	HUN	Bence Varga
22	MF	HUN	Máté Katona
27	MF	HUN	Ádám Pintér
29	FW	HUN	László Lencse
33	DF	UKR	Yevhen Selin
38	DF	HUN	Ádám Vass
62	MF	HUN	Ronald Takács
70	FW	HUN	Tamás Kulcsár
77	DF	HUN	Ákos Baki
88	DF	NGA	George Ikenne
98	GK	HUN	László Horváth

== Transfers ==
=== Summer ===
In: Note: Flags indicate national team as defined under FIFA eligibility rules; some limited exceptions apply. Players may hold more than one non-FIFA nationality.

No.	Pos.	Nation	Player
1	GK	UKR	Artem Kychak (from (Ukraine) Olimpik Donetsk)
6	MF	SEN	Khaly Thiam (loan return from (Bulgaria) Levski Sofia)
6	MF	HUN	Bálint Vogyicska (loan return from Vasas)
9	MF	HUN	István Bognár (from Mezőkövesd)
20	GK	HUN	Bence Varga (from MTK Budapest II)
27	MF	HUN	Ádám Pintér (from (Germany) Greuther Fürth)
33	DF	UKR	Yevhen Selin (from (Greece) Asteras Tripolis)
88	DF	NGA	George Ikenne (from Budapest Honvéd)
98	GK	HUN	László Horváth (from Balmazújváros)
99	FW	BRA	Myke Ramos (loan return from Haladás)

Out: Note: Flags indicate national team as defined under FIFA eligibility rules; some limited exceptions apply. Players may hold more than one non-FIFA nationality.

No.	Pos.	Nation	Player
1	GK	HUN	Viktor Szentpéteri (to Mezőkövesd)
6	MF	SEN	Khaly Thiam (to (Bulgaria) Levski Sofia)
12	MF	HUN	Dávid Jakab (to Győr)
20	FW	HUN	Ádám Hrepka (to Vasas)
21	MF	HUN	Gábor Bori (to Monor)
23	DF	HUN	Attila Talabér (loan to Vasas)
30	MF	HUN	Bálint Borbély (to Vasas)
34	GK	HUN	Tamás Fadgyas (to Nyíregyháza)
67	MF	HUN	Bence Bayer (loan to Monor)
99	GK	HUN	Balázs Bese (loan to Vasas)
99	FW	BRA	Myke Ramos (loan to (United Arab Emirates) Al-Ittihad)

=== Winter ===
In: Note: Flags indicate national team as defined under FIFA eligibility rules; some limited exceptions apply. Players may hold more than one non-FIFA nationality.

No.	Pos.	Nation	Player
7	MF	HUN	Szabolcs Schön (from (Netherlands) Ajax U-19)
17	MF	AUT	Slobodan Mihajlović (from (Austria) Horn)
18	FW	MLI	Ulysse Diallo (from Puskás Akadémia)
71	MF	HUN	Anton Bidzilya (from MTK Budapest U-19)
73	DF	HUN	Benedek Varju (from MTK Budapest U-19)
74	MF	HUN	Gergely Kapronczai (from MTK Budapest U-19)
—	DF	HUN	Norbert Farkas (from Balmazújváros)

Out: Note: Flags indicate national team as defined under FIFA eligibility rules; some limited exceptions apply. Players may hold more than one non-FIFA nationality.

No.	Pos.	Nation	Player
7	FW	HUN	Balázs Farkas (to Zalaegerszeg)
8	MF	HUN	András Schäfer (to (Italy) Genoa)
17	MF	HUN	Kevin Korozmán (to Soroksár)
62	DF	HUN	Ronald Takács
—	DF	HUN	Norbert Farkas (loan to Monor)

== Statistics ==
=== Appearances and goals ===
Last updated on 19 May 2019.

No.	Pos	Nat	Player	Total		OTP Bank Liga		Hungarian Cup	
No.	Pos	Nat	Player	Apps	Goals	Apps	Goals	Apps	Goals
1	GK	(Ukraine) UKR	Artem Kychak	25	-39	25	-39	0	0
3	DF	(Hungary) HUN	Bence Deutsch	7	0	7	0	0	0
5	DF	(Hungary) HUN	Béla Balogh	25	0	23	0	2	0
6	MF	(Hungary) HUN	Bálint Vogyicska	21	2	18	0	3	2
7	MF	(Hungary) HUN	Szabolcs Schön	5	0	5	0	0	0
9	MF	(Hungary) HUN	István Bognár	34	6	33	5	1	1
10	MF	(Hungary) HUN	Patrik Vass	24	2	22	1	2	1
11	FW	(Hungary) HUN	Dániel Gera	27	8	25	6	2	2
13	DF	(Hungary) HUN	Gergő Gengeliczki	21	0	19	0	2	0
14	FW	(Hungary) HUN	Sándor Torghelle	31	8	29	7	2	1
17	MF	(Austria) AUT	Slobodan Mihajlović	5	0	5	0	0	0
18	FW	(Mali) MLI	Ulysse Diallo	10	1	10	1	0	0
19	MF	(Hungary) HUN	József Kanta	30	7	27	6	3	1
22	MF	(Hungary) HUN	Máté Katona	27	1	25	1	2	0
27	MF	(Hungary) HUN	Ádám Pintér	25	0	24	0	1	0
29	FW	(Hungary) HUN	László Lencse	32	6	31	6	1	0
33	DF	(Ukraine) UKR	Yevhen Selin	29	2	27	1	2	1
38	DF	(Hungary) HUN	Ádám Vass	29	0	29	0	0	0
62	DF	(Ghana) GHA	Nasiru Banahene	5	0	5	0	0	0
70	FW	(Hungary) HUN	Tamás Kulcsár	16	3	13	1	3	2
71	MF	(Hungary) HUN	Anton Bidzilya	3	0	2	0	1	0
73	DF	(Hungary) HUN	Benedek Varju	1	0	1	0	0	0
77	DF	(Hungary) HUN	Ákos Baki	12	2	10	2	2	0
88	DF	(Nigeria) NGA	George Ikenne	8	0	7	0	1	0
98	GK	(Hungary) HUN	László Horváth	10	-17	8	-16	2	-1
Youth players:
8	MF	(Hungary) HUN	Mihály Kata	1	0	0	0	1	0
11	DF	(Hungary) HUN	Barnabás Nagy	1	0	0	0	1	0
20	GK	(Hungary) HUN	Bence Varga	3	-1	0	0	3	-1
Out to loan:
99	FW	(Brazil) BRA	Myke Ramos	4	2	4	2	0	0
Players no longer at the club:
7	FW	(Hungary) HUN	Balázs Farkas	16	5	13	2	3	3
8	MF	(Hungary) HUN	András Schäfer	15	1	14	1	1	0
62	MF	(Hungary) HUN	Ronald Takács	2	0	1	0	1	0

=== Top scorers ===
Includes all competitive matches. The list is sorted by shirt number when total goals are equal.

Last updated on 19 May 2019

Position	Nation	Number	Name	OTP Bank Liga	Hungarian Cup	Total
1	(Hungary)	14	Sándor Torghelle	7	1	8
2	(Hungary)	11	Dániel Gera	6	2	8
3	(Hungary)	19	József Kanta	6	1	7
4	(Hungary)	29	László Lencse	6	0	6
5	(Hungary)	9	István Bognár	5	1	6
6	(Hungary)	7	Balázs Farkas	2	3	5
7	(Hungary)	70	Tamás Kulcsár	1	2	3
8	(Brazil)	99	Myke Ramos	2	0	2
9	(Hungary)	77	Ákos Baki	2	0	2
10	(Hungary)	10	Patrik Vass	1	1	2
11	(Ukraine)	33	Yevhen Selin	1	1	2
12	(Hungary)	6	Bálint Vogyicska	0	2	2
13	(Hungary)	8	András Schäfer	1	0	1
14	(Hungary)	22	Máté Katona	1	0	1
15	(Mali)	18	Ulysse Diallo	1	0	1
/	/	/	Own Goals	0	0	0
			TOTALS	42	14	56

=== Disciplinary record ===
Includes all competitive matches. Players with 1 card or more included only.

Last updated on 19 May 2019

Position	Nation	Number	Name	OTP Bank Liga		Hungarian Cup		Total (Hu Total)	
Position	Nation	Number	Name	Booked	Sent off (straight red)	Booked	Sent off (straight red)	Booked	Sent off (straight red)
GK	(Ukraine)	1	Artem Kychak	2	0	0	0	2 (2)	0 (0)
DF	(Hungary)	5	Béla Balogh	2	0	0	0	2 (2)	0 (0)
MF	(Hungary)	6	Bálint Vogyicska	4	0	0	0	4 (4)	0 (0)
FW	(Hungary)	7	Balázs Farkas	1	0	0	0	1 (1)	0 (0)
MF	(Hungary)	8	András Schäfer	0	0	1	0	1 (0)	0 (0)
MF	(Hungary)	10	Patrik Vass	1	0	0	0	1 (1)	0 (0)
FW	(Hungary)	11	Dániel Gera	8	0	1	0	9 (8)	0 (0)
DF	(Hungary)	13	Gergő Gengeliczki	7	0	1	0	8 (7)	0 (0)
FW	(Hungary)	14	Sándor Torghelle	9	0	0	0	9 (9)	0 (0)
MF	(Austria)	17	Slobodan Mihajlović	1	0	0	0	1 (1)	0 (0)
FW	(Mali)	18	Ulysse Diallo	1	0	0	0	1 (1)	0 (0)
MF	(Hungary)	19	József Kanta	8	1	0	0	8 (8)	1 (1)
DF	(Hungary)	22	Máté Katona	5	0	0	0	5 (5)	0 (0)
MF	(Hungary)	27	Ádám Pintér	6	0	0	0	6 (6)	0 (0)
FW	(Hungary)	29	László Lencse	6	0	0	0	6 (6)	0 (0)
DF	(Ukraine)	33	Yevhen Selin	4	0	0	0	4 (4)	0 (0)
DF	(Hungary)	38	Ádám Vass	4	0	0	0	4 (4)	0 (0)
FW	(Hungary)	70	Tamás Kulcsár	3	0	0	0	3 (3)	0 (0)
MF	(Hungary)	71	Anton Bidzilya	2	0	0	0	2 (2)	0 (0)
DF	(Hungary)	73	Benedek Varju	1	0	0	0	1 (1)	0 (0)
DF	(Hungary)	77	Ákos Baki	2	1	0	0	2 (2)	1 (1)
DF	(Nigeria)	88	George Ikenne	2	0	0	0	2 (2)	0 (0)
			TOTALS	79	2	5	0	84 (79)	2 (2)

=== Overall ===
Games played	36 (33 OTP Bank Liga and 3 Hungarian Cup)
Games won	12 (10 OTP Bank Liga and 2 Hungarian Cup)
Games drawn	4 (4 OTP Bank Liga and 0 Hungarian Cup)
Games lost	20 (19 OTP Bank Liga and 1 Hungarian Cup)
Goals scored	56
Goals conceded	58
Goal difference	−2
Yellow cards	84
Red cards	2
Worst discipline	(Hungary) József Kanta (8 (yellow card) , 1 (red card) )
Best result	8–0 (A) v Tállya – Magyar Kupa – 22-09-2018
Worst result	1–4 (H) v Ferencváros – Nemzeti Bajnokság I – 29-07-2018
Worst result	0–3 (A) v Paks – Nemzeti Bajnokság I – 15-09-2018
Worst result	1–4 (H) v Budapest Honvéd – Nemzeti Bajnokság I – 19-05-2019
Most appearances	(Hungary) István Bognár (34 appearances)
Top scorer	(Hungary) Dániel Gera (8 goals)
Top scorer	(Hungary) Sándor Torghelle (8 goals)
Points	40/108 (37.04%)

Last updated: 19 May 2019

== Nemzeti Bajnokság I ==
=== Matches ===
22 July 2018 1	Újpest	0–2	MTK Budapest	Budapest, Pest County
19:30 CEST		Report	Lencse 26'; Kanta 90+2' (pen.)	Stadium: Szusza Ferenc Stadion; Attendance: 2,738; Referee: (Hungary) Viktor Kassai

29 July 2018 2	MTK Budapest	1–4	Ferencváros	Budapest, Pest County
18:00 CEST	Kanta 60' (pen.)	Report	Bőle 15'; Petryak 34', 38'; Varga 88'	Stadium: Hidegkuti Nándor Stadion; Attendance: 4,079; Referee: (Hungary) Viktor Kassai

4 August 2018 3	Puskás Akadémia	1–2	MTK Budapest	Felcsút, Fejér County
17:00 CEST	Kiss 56'	Report	Ramos 33'; Torghelle 86'	Stadium: Pancho Arena; Attendance: 837; Referee: (Hungary) Ádám Farkas

11 August 2018 4	MTK Budapest	1–0	Diósgyőr	Budapest, Pest County
19:30 CEST	Ramos 56'	Report		Stadium: Hidegkuti Nándor Stadion; Attendance: 2,178; Referee: (Hungary) Sándor Andó-Szabó

17 August 2018 5	Debrecen	3–3	MTK Budapest	Debrecen, Hajdú-Bihar County
20:00 CEST	Bódi 41'; Takács 87'; Szatmári 90+5'	Report	Kanta 15'; Lencse 42', 75'	Stadium: Nagyerdei Stadion; Attendance: 4,002; Referee: (Hungary) Balázs Berke

25 August 2018 6	Haladás	1–2	MTK Budapest	Szombathely, Vas County
20:45 CEST	Gaál 90+1'	Report	Schäfer 13'; Gera 81'	Stadium: Haladás Sportkomplexum; Attendance: 4,117; Referee: (Hungary) Ferenc Karakó

1 September 2018 7	MTK Budapest	0–1	Kisvárda	Budapest, Pest County
19:30 CEST		Report	Vári 36' (pen.)	Stadium: Hidegkuti Nándor Stadion; Attendance: 1,632; Referee: (Hungary) Péter Solymosi

15 September 2018 8	Paks	3–0	MTK Budapest	Paks, Tolna County
17:00 CEST	Hahn 31'; Kecskés 73'; Simon 90+4'	Report		Stadium: Fehérvári úti Stadion; Attendance: 864; Referee: (Hungary) Zoltán Iványi

29 September 2018 9	MTK Budapest	2–2	Mezőkövesd	Budapest, Pest County
17:00 CEST	Bognár 7'; Kanta 89' (pen.)	Report	Molnár 63'; Dražić 80'	Stadium: Hidegkuti Nándor Stadion; Attendance: 1,852; Referee: (Hungary) Ferenc Karakó

7 October 2018 10	MOL Vidi	0–3	MTK Budapest	Felcsút, Fejér County
18:00 CEST		Report	Gera 22'; Kanta 36'; Bognár 71'	Stadium: Pancho Arena; Attendance: 1,220; Referee: (Hungary) Viktor Kassai

20 October 2018 11	MTK Budapest	1–1	Budapest Honvéd	Budapest, Pest County
17:00 CEST	Bognár 84'	Report	Batik 36'	Stadium: Hidegkuti Nándor Stadion; Attendance: 3,314; Referee: (Hungary) Csaba Pintér

27 October 2018 12	MTK Budapest	1–0	Újpest	Budapest, Pest County
14:30 CEST	Bognár 17' (pen.)	Report		Stadium: Hidegkuti Nándor Stadion; Attendance: 3,092; Referee: (Hungary) Zoltán Iványi

3 November 2018 13	Ferencváros	2–0	MTK Budapest	Budapest, Pest County
19:30 CET	Bőle 24'; Sigér 39'	Report		Stadium: Groupama Arena; Attendance: 11,067; Referee: (Hungary) Sándor Andó-Szabó

10 November 2018 14	MTK Budapest	3–2	Puskás Akadémia	Budapest, Pest County
17:00 CET	Lencse 26'; Baki 65'; Torghelle 81'	Report	Arabuli 38'; Knežević 76'	Stadium: Hidegkuti Nándor Stadion; Attendance: 1,849; Referee: (Hungary) Balázs Berke

24 November 2018 15	Diósgyőr	3–2	MTK Budapest	Miskolc, Borsod-Abaúj-Zemplén County
19:30 CET	Balogh 13' (o.g.); Hasani 41'; Vernes 74'	Report	B. Farkas 81'; Torghelle 90+5' (pen.)	Stadium: DVTK Stadion; Attendance: 2,070; Referee: (Hungary) József Erdős

1 December 2018 16	MTK Budapest	0–1	Debrecen	Budapest, Pest County
17:00 CET		Report	Varga 10'	Stadium: Hidegkuti Nándor Stadion; Attendance: 1,758; Referee: (Hungary) Gergő Bogár

8 December 2018 17	MTK Budapest	4–0	Szombathelyi Haladás	Budapest, Pest County
17:00 CET	Baki 5'; Lencse 49'; Gera 57'; B. Farkas 87'	Report		Stadium: Hidegkuti Nándor Stadion; Attendance: 1,538; Referee: (Hungary) Ferenc Karakó

15 December 2018 18	Kisvárda	1–0	MTK Budapest	Kisvárda, Szabolcs-Szatmár-Bereg County
17:00 CET	Ilić 76'	Report		Stadium: Várkert Sportpálya; Attendance: 1,174; Referee: (Hungary) Ádám Radványi

2 February 2019 19	MTK Budapest	1–2	Paks	Budapest, Pest County
14:00 CET	Bognár 85'	Report	Remili 41'; Szabó 76'	Stadium: Hidegkuti Nándor Stadion; Attendance: 1,381; Referee: (Hungary) Tamás Bognár

9 February 2019 20	Mezőkövesd	2–3	MTK Budapest	Mezőkövesd, Borsod-Abaúj-Zemplén County
17:00 CET	Dražić 28'; Vayda 47'	Report	Katona 32'; Kanta 65'; P. Vass 78'	Stadium: Mezőkövesdi Városi Stadion; Attendance: 1,380; Referee: (Hungary) Balázs Berke

16 February 2019 21	MTK Budapest	1–3	MOL Vidi	Budapest, Pest County
19:30 CET	Torghelle 62'	Report	Hadžić 9'; Šćepović 11'; Stopira 36'	Stadium: Hidegkuti Nándor Stadion; Attendance: 2,105; Referee: (Hungary) Viktor Kassai

23 February 2019 22	Budapest Honvéd	2–1	MTK Budapest	Győr, Győr-Moson-Sopron County
19:30 CET	Holender 44'; Ben-Hatira 58'	Report	Torghelle 52'	Stadium: Ménfői úti Stadion; Attendance: 520; Referee: (Hungary) Gergő Bogár

2 March 2019 23	Újpest	0–0	MTK Budapest	Budapest, Pest County
17:00 CET		Report		Stadium: Szusza Ferenc Stadion; Attendance: 2,786; Referee: (Hungary) Péter Solymosi

9 March 2019 24	MTK Budapest	1–3	Ferencváros	Budapest, Pest County
19:30 CET	Gera 77'	Report	Varga 5'; Lanzafame 29', 42'	Stadium: Hidegkuti Nándor Stadion; Attendance: 4,587; Referee: (Hungary) Csaba Pintér

16 March 2019 25	Puskás Akadémia	3–2	MTK Budapest	Felcsút, Fejér County
17:00 CET	Varga 4'; Nagy 48'; Tamás 90+1'	Report	Selin 28'; Torghelle 35'	Stadium: Pancho Arena; Attendance: 1,121; Referee: (Hungary) István Vad

30 March 2019 26	MTK Budapest	2–1	Diósgyőr	Budapest, Pest County
17:00 CET	Gera 22', 77'	Report	Tajti 43'	Stadium: Hidegkuti Nándor Stadion; Attendance: 2,877; Referee: (Hungary) Sándor Andó-Szabó

6 April 2019 27	Debrecen	3–1	MTK Budapest	Debrecen, Hajdú-Bihar County
17:00 CEST	Ferenczi 5', 22'; Bódi 69'	Report	Torghelle 36'	Stadium: Nagyerdei Stadion; Attendance: 3,200; Referee: (Hungary) Viktor Kassai

13 April 2019 28	Haladás	1–0	MTK Budapest	Szombathely, Vas County
17:00 CEST	Gaál 85'	Report		Stadium: Haladás Sportkomplexum; Attendance: 3,440; Referee: (Hungary) Gergely Szőts

20 April 2019 29	MTK Budapest	0–1	Kisvárda	Budapest, Pest County
17:00 CEST		Report	Horváth 20'	Stadium: Hidegkuti Nándor Stadion; Attendance: 1,819; Referee: (Hungary) Péter Solymosi

27 April 2019 30	Paks	1–0	MTK Budapest	Paks, Tolna County
17:00 CEST	Hahn 25'	Report		Stadium: Fehérvári úti Stadion; Attendance: 1,153; Referee: (Hungary) István Vad

4 May 2019 31	MTK Budapest	0–1	Mezőkövesd	Budapest, Pest County
17:00 CEST		Report	Pekár 50'	Stadium: Hidegkuti Nándor Stadion; Attendance: 1,622; Referee: (Hungary) Zoltán Iványi

11 May 2019 32	MOL Vidi	4–2	MTK Budapest	Székesfehérvár, Fejér County
17:00 CEST	Huszti 32' (pen.); Nikolov 64'; Nego 87'; Kovács 90+1'	Report	Diallo 24'; Kulcsár 89'	Stadium: MOL Aréna Sóstó; Attendance: 3,113; Referee: (Hungary) Gergő Bogár

19 May 2019 33	MTK Budapest	1–4	Budapest Honvéd	Budapest, Pest County
17:00 CEST	Lencse 21'	Report	Holender 20'; Kamber 53'; Ngog 76', 90+1'	Stadium: Hidegkuti Nándor Stadion; Attendance: 3,882; Referee: (Hungary) Sándor Andó-Szabó

=== League table ===
Pos	Team	Pld	W	D	L	GF	GA	GD	Pts	Qualification or relegation
8	Paks	33	9	12	12	33	46	−13	39	
9	Kisvárda	33	10	8	15	36	48	−12	38	
10	Diósgyőr	33	10	8	15	36	57	−21	38	
11	MTK (R)	33	10	4	19	42	56	−14	34	Relegation to the Nemzeti Bajnokság II
12	Haladás (R)	33	8	6	19	31	51	−20	30	Relegation to the Nemzeti Bajnokság II

Source: Hungarian Football Federation (in Hungarian), Soccerway
Rules for classification: 1) Points; 2) Matches won; 3) Goal difference; 4) Goals scored; 5) Head-to-head points; 6) Head-to-head goal difference; 7) Head-to-head away goals scored; 8) Fair play ranking; 9) Drawing of lots.
(R) Relegated

=== Results summary ===
Overall								Home						Away					
Pld	W	D	L	GF	GA	GD	Pts	W	D	L	GF	GA	GD	W	D	L	GF	GA	GD
33	10	4	19	42	56	−14	34	5	2	9	19	26	−7	5	2	10	23	30	−7

Last updated: 19 May 2019.
Source: NB1

=== Results by round ===
Round	1	2	3	4	5	6	7	8	9	10	11	12	13	14	15	16	17	18	19	20	21	22	23	24	25	26	27	28	29	30	31	32	33
Ground	A	H	A	H	A	A	H	A	H	A	H	H	A	H	A	H	H	A	H	A	H	A	A	H	A	H	A	A	H	A	H	A	H
Result	W	L	W	W	D	W	L	L	D	W	D	W	L	W	L	L	W	L	L	W	L	L	D	L	L	W	L	L	L	L	L	L	L
Position	4	6	5	3	4	4	4	4	4	4	5	4	4	4	4	4	4	6	6	5	6	6	7	7	7	7	7	7	7	9	10	11	11

Updated to match(es) played on 19 May 2019. Source: Matches
A = Away; H = Home; W = Win; D = Draw; L = Loss

== Hungarian Cup ==
22 September 2018 Round 6	Tállya	0–8	MTK Budapest	Tállya, Borsod-Abaúj-Zemplén County
15:00 CEST		Report	Torghelle 6'; B. Farkas 19', 35'; Selin 38'; Gera 47', 66'; Vass 62'; Bognár 78'	Stadium: Tállyai Sporttelep; Attendance: 620; Referee: (Hungary) János Takács

31 October 2018 Round 7	Vecsés	0–5	MTK Budapest	Vecsés, Pest County
12:30 CET		Report	B. Farkas 4'; Kulcsár 60', 64'; Vogyicska 65', 87'	Stadium: Vecsési Sporttelep; Attendance: 450; Referee: (Hungary) Gábor Kátai

5 December 2018 Round of 32	Ajka	2–1	MTK Budapest	Ajka, Veszprém County
15:00 CET	Nagy 40' (pen.); Horváth 68'	Report	Kanta 8' (pen.)	Stadium: Városi Stadion; Attendance: 800; Referee: (Hungary) Zoltán J. Kovács
