= 2020–21 MTK Budapest FC season =

MTK Budapest FC
2020–21 season
- Chairman: Tamás Deutsch
- Manager: Michael Boris
- Stadium: Hidegkuti Nándor Stadion
- NB 1: 7th
- Hungarian Cup: Semi-final
- Top goalscorer: League: Szabolcs Schön (9 goals); All: Roland Varga (11 goals)
- Highest home attendance: 4,445 vs Ferencváros (14 August)
- Lowest home attendance: 0
Home colours	Away colours	Third colours

The 2019–20 season was MTK Budapest FC's 118th competitive season, 1st consecutive season in the OTP Bank Liga and 132nd year in existence as a football club.

== Transfers ==
=== Summer ===
In: Note: Flags indicate national team as defined under FIFA eligibility rules; some limited exceptions apply. Players may hold more than one non-FIFA nationality.

No.	Pos.	Nation	Player
1	GK	MNE	Milan Mijatović (from (Bulgaria) Levski Sofia)
4	DF	POR	Tiago Ferreira (from (Romania) Universitatea Craiova)
15	DF	HUN	Szabolcs Barna (from Debrecen)
16	DF	COL	Sebastián Herrera (from (North Macedonia) Rabotnički)
18	GK	HUN	Dániel Varasdi (from MTK Budapest U-19)
20	DF	NGR	George Ikenne (loan return from Budapest Honvéd)
21	DF	HUN	Benjamin Balázs (from Újpest)
30	FW	MKD	Bojan Miovski (from (North Macedonia) Renova)
—	FW	HUN	Olivér Horváth (from (Netherlands) Jong PSV)
—	DF	GHA	Nasiru Banahene (loan return from (Finland) Honka)
—	DF	HUN	Barnabás Nagy (from MTK Budapest U-19)
—	MF	HUN	Gergely Kapronczai (loan return from III. Kerület)
—	MF	HUN	Miklós Szerencsi (loan return from Monor)

Out: Note: Flags indicate national team as defined under FIFA eligibility rules; some limited exceptions apply. Players may hold more than one non-FIFA nationality.

No.	Pos.	Nation	Player
—	DF	GHA	Nasiru Banahene (to (Finland) Honka)
—	DF	HUN	Roland Lehoczky (loan to Szentlőrinc)
—	FW	HUN	Olivér Horváth (loan to Szombathelyi Haladás)
—	MF	HUN	Miklós Szerencsi (loan to Dorog)
—	FW	HUN	Ákos Zuigéber (loan to Dorog)
—	MF	HUN	Máté Kovács (loan to Dorog)
—	DF	HUN	Barnabás Nagy (loan to Szentlőrinc)
—	FW	HUN	Péter Törőcsik (loan to Szentlőrinc)
—	MF	HUN	Gergely Kapronczai (loan to Szentlőrinc)
—	GK	HUN	Balázs Bese (loan to Budafok)
—	DF	HUN	Bence Deutsch (to Siófok)
—	MF	HUN	Patrik Vass (to Zalaegerszeg)
—	DF	HUN	Noel Fülöp (to Tiszakécske)
—	MF	HUN	István Szatmári (to Gyirmót)
—	GK	HUN	Bence Varga (to Szeged)
—	MF	HUN	István Bognár (to Paks)

=== Winter ===
In: Note: Flags indicate national team as defined under FIFA eligibility rules; some limited exceptions apply. Players may hold more than one non-FIFA nationality.

No.	Pos.	Nation	Player
—	DF	FIN	Nikolai Alho (from (Finland) HJK Helsinki)
—	FW	HUN	Roland Varga (from Ferencváros)
—	DF	CRO	Marko Perković (from (Slovenia) Olimpija)
—	DF	SRB	Filip Antonijević (from (Serbia) Metalac)
—	FW	HUN	Olivér Horváth (loan return from Szombathelyi Haladás)
—	FW	BIH	Andrija Drljo (from MTK Budapest U-19)
—	MF	HUN	Anton Bidzilya (loan return from Békéscsaba)
—	MF	HUN	Máté Kovács (loan return from Dorog)
—	MF	HUN	Barnabás Biben (from MTK Budapest U-19)
—	FW	GHA	Clinton Osei (from MTK Budapest U-19)

Out: Note: Flags indicate national team as defined under FIFA eligibility rules; some limited exceptions apply. Players may hold more than one non-FIFA nationality.

No.	Pos.	Nation	Player
11	FW	HUN	Dániel Gera (to Ferencváros)
22	MF	HUN	Máté Katona (to Ferencváros)
29	FW	HUN	László Lencse (to Gyirmót)
—	MF	HUN	Anton Bidzilya (loan to Kaposvár)
—	MF	HUN	Máté Kovács (loan to Kazincbarcika)
—	FW	HUN	Olivér Horváth (to Győr)

=== Nemzeti Bajnokság I ===
==== League table ====
Pos	Team	Pld	W	D	L	GF	GA	GD	Pts	Qualification or relegation
5	Kisvárda	33	12	10	11	30	36	−6	46	
6	Újpest	33	12	6	15	46	67	−21	42	Qualification for the Europa Conference League second qualifying round (Note: Újpest qualified for the Europa Conference League second qualifying round as the 2020–21 Magyar Kupa winners.)
7	MTK	33	11	9	13	44	49	−5	42	
8	Mezőkövesd	33	11	9	13	40	46	−6	42	
9	Zalaegerszeg	33	10	7	16	58	58	0	37	

Source: Hungarian Football Federation (in Hungarian), Soccerway
Rules for classification: 1) Points; 2) Matches won; 3) Goal difference; 4) Goals scored; 5) Head-to-head points; 6) Head-to-head goal difference; 7) Head-to-head away goals scored; 8) Fair play ranking; 9) Drawing of lots.

==== Results summary ====
Overall								Home						Away					
Pld	W	D	L	GF	GA	GD	Pts	W	D	L	GF	GA	GD	W	D	L	GF	GA	GD
33	11	9	13	44	49	−5	42	5	5	6	20	20	0	6	4	7	24	29	−5

Last updated: 15 May 2021.
Source: NB1

==== Results by round ====
Round	1	2	3	4	5	6	7	8	9	10	11	12	13	14	15	16	17	18	19	20	21	22	23	24	25	26	27	28	29	30	31	32	33
Ground	H	H	A	H	A	H	A	H	A	H	A	A	A	H	A	H	A	H	A	H	A	H	H	A	A	H	A	H	A	H	A	H	A
Result	D	W	D	L	L	L	W	D	W	W	W	L	D	W	L	W	D	L	W	L	W	D	D	L	D	W	L	D	L	L	W	L	L
Position	8	3	4	8	9	12	9	9	7	5	4	6	6	5	5	4	4	5	4	5	4	4	4	4	4	4	4	5	5	6	5	6	7

Updated to match(es) played on 15 May 2021. Source: Matches
A = Away; H = Home; W = Win; D = Draw; L = Loss

==== Matches ====
14 August 2020 1	MTK Budapest	1 – 1	Ferencváros	Budapest
18:15 CEST	Gera 37'	Report	Nguen 59'	Stadium: Hidegkuti Nándor Stadion; Attendance: 4,445; Referee: Péter Solymosi

21 August 2020 2	MTK Budapest	3 – 1	Budapest Honvéd	Budapest
19:00 CEST	Gera 16'; Herrera 66'; Katona 77'	Report	Gazdag 26'	Stadium: Hidegkuti Nándor Stadion; Attendance: 3,199; Referee: Ádám Pillók

28 August 2020 3	Diósgyőr	1 – 1	MTK Budapest	Miskolc
20:00 CEST	Molnár 29'	Report	Schön 55'	Stadium: DVTK Stadion; Attendance: 4,353; Referee: Balázs Berke

13 September 2020 4	MTK Budapest	0 – 3	Zalaegerszeg	Budapest
17:30 CEST		Report	Favorov 42'; Bedi 75'; Szánthó 88'	Stadium: Hidegkuti Nándor Stadion; Attendance: 2,501; Referee: Ferenc Karakó

26 September 2020 5	Paks	4 – 0	MTK Budapest	Paks
14:45 CEST	Hahn 38' (pen.), 57' (pen.), 81'; Szakály 53'	Report		Stadium: Stadion PSE; Attendance: 1,398; Referee: József Erdős

2 October 2020 6	MTK Budapest	1 – 2	Budafok	Budapest
20:00 CEST	Miovski 73'	Report	Skribek 3'; Ihrig-Farkas 88'	Stadium: Hidegkuti Nándor Stadion; Attendance: 1,573; Referee: Sándor Andó-Szabó

17 October 2020 7	Puskás Akadémia	0 – 3	MTK Budapest	Felcsút
19:30 CEST		Report	Miovski 4'; Gera 26'; Prosser 80'	Stadium: Pancho Aréna; Attendance: 957; Referee: Csaba Pintér

24 October 2020 8	MTK Budapest	1 – 1	Kisvárda	Budapest
14:45 CET	Gera 24' (pen.)	Report	Kovácsréti 60'	Stadium: Hidegkuti Nándor Stadion; Attendance: 1,084; Referee: Péter Antal

1 November 2020 9	Újpest	0 – 4	MTK Budapest	Budapest
16:00 CET		Report	Prosser 4', 10'; Miovski 18', 90+3'	Stadium: Szusza Ferenc Stadion; Attendance: 1,150; Referee: Péter Solymosi

7 November 2020 10	MTK Budapest	3 – 1	Fehérvár	Budapest
19:45 CET	Cseke 9' (pen.); Schön 64'; Miovski 66'	Report	Stopira 88'	Stadium: Hidegkuti Nándor Stadion; Attendance: 1,356; Referee: Gergő Bogár

21 November 2020 11	Mezőkövesd	0 – 1	MTK Budapest	Mezőkövesd
17:00 CET		Report	Ikenne 21'	Stadium: Mezőkövesdi Városi Stadion; Attendance: x Referee: József Erdős

28 November 2020 12	Ferencváros	2 – 0	MTK Budapest	Budapest
19:30 CET	Nguen 40'; Baturina 75'	Report		Stadium: Groupama Arena; Attendance: 0 Referee: Péter Antal

6 December 2020 13	Budapest Honvéd	2 – 2	MTK Budapest	Budapest
15:15 CET	Tamás 20'; Hidi 27'	Report	Miovski 51'; Cseke 85' (pen.)	Stadium: Hidegkuti Nándor Stadion; Attendance: 0 Referee: Zoltán Iványi

13 December 2020 14	MTK Budapest	1 – 0	Diósgyőr	Budapest
17:00 CET	Kata 90+2'	Report		Stadium: Hidegkuti Nándor Stadion; Attendance: 0 Referee: Gergő Bogár

16 December 2020 15	Zalaegerszeg	2 – 0	MTK Budapest	Zalaegerszeg
18:00 CET	Zimonyi 5'; Szánthó 12'	Report		Stadium: ZTE Arena; Attendance: 0 Referee: Péter Solymosi

19 December 2020 16	MTK Budapest	3 – 1	Paks	Budapest
14:45 CET	Dimitrov 74'; Prosser 79'; Schön 90'	Report	Nagy 90+4'	Stadium: Hidegkuti Nándor Stadion; Attendance: 0 Referee: Ádám Farkas

24 January 2021 17	Budafok	2 – 2	MTK Budapest	Budapest
13:30 CET	Skribek 6'; Csonka 53'	Report	Schön 2'; Varga 27'	Stadium: Promontor utcai Stadion; Attendance: 0 Referee: Gergő Bogár

30 January 2021 18	MTK Budapest	0 – 1	Puskás Akadémia	Budapest
12:30 CET		Report	Géresi 90+5'	Stadium: Hidegkuti Nándor Stadion; Attendance: 0 Referee: József Erdősi

2 February 2021 19	Kisvárda	0 – 2	MTK Budapest	Kisvárda
17:30 CET		Report	Schön 39'; Varga 52'	Stadium: Várkerti Stadion; Attendance: 0 Referee: Mihály Káprály

6 February 2021 20	MTK Budapest	1 – 3	Újpest	Budapest
19:30 CET	Varga 4'	Report	Simon 28'; Mitrović 32'; Stieber 42'	Stadium: Hidegkuti Nándor Stadion; Attendance: 0 Referee: Péter Solymosi

14 February 2021 21	Fehérvár	1 – 2	MTK Budapest	Székesfehérvár
17:00 CET	Hangya 8'	Report	Miovski 52'; Varga 75' (pen.)	Stadium: MOL Aréna Sóstó; Attendance: 0 Referee: Péter Antal
Note: COVID-19 pandemic in Hungary

19 February 2021 22	MTK Budapest	0 – 0	Mezőkövesd	Budapest
20:00 CET		Report		Stadium: Hidegkuti Nándor Stadion; Attendance: x Referee: Balázs Berke
Note: COVID-19 pandemic in Hungary

27 February 2021 23	MTK Budapest	2 – 2	Ferencváros	Budapest
19:30 CET	Nagy 55'; Varga 60'	Report	Zubkov 1', 23'	Stadium: Hidegkuti Nándor Stadion; Attendance: x Referee: Gergő Bogár
Note: COVID-19 pandemic in Hungary

2 March 2021 24	Budapest Honvéd	3 – 2	MTK Budapest	Budapest
17:30 CET	Gazdag 34'; Balogh 71', 73'	Report	Varga 6'; Schön 18'	Stadium: Hidegkuti Nándor Stadion; Attendance: 0 Referee: Ferenc Karakó
Note: COVID-19 pandemic in Hungary

5 March 2021 25	Diósgyőr	0 – 0	MTK Budapest	Miskolc
20:00 CET		Report		Stadium: DVTK Stadion; Attendance: 0 Referee: Zoltán Iványi
Note: COVID-19 pandemic in Hungary

13 March 2021 26	MTK Budapest	3 – 0	Zalaegerszeg	Budapest
17:00 CET	Schön 67'; Mezei 90' (pen.); Demjén 90+3' (o.g.)	Report		Stadium: Hidegkuti Nándor Stadion; Attendance: x Referee: Sándor Andó-Szabó
Note: COVID-19 pandemic in Hungary

3 April 2021 27	Paks	3 – 1	MTK Budapest	Paks
14:45 CEST	Pintér 25' (o.g.); Hahn 31', 75'	Report	Schön 56'	Stadium: Fehérvári úti Stadion; Attendance: 0 Referee: Gergő Bogár
Note: COVID-19 pandemic in Hungary

10 April 2021 28	MTK Budapest	0 – 0	Budafok	Budapest
14:45 CEST		Report		Stadium: Hidegkuti Nándor Stadion; Attendance: 0 Referee: Péter Solymosi
Note: COVID-19 pandemic in Hungary

18 April 2021 29	Puskás Akadémia	3 – 0	MTK Budapest	Felcsút
15:15 CET	Kiss 9'; Plšek 36' (pen.), 69'	Report		Stadium: Pancho Aréna; Attendance: 0 Referee: Mihály Káprály
Note: COVID-19 pandemic in Hungary

21 April 2021 30	MTK Budapest	0 – 1	Kisvárda	Budapest
15:15 CET		Report	Ćirković 24'	Stadium: Hidegkuti Nándor Stadion; Attendance: 0 Referee: Ádám Pillók
Note: COVID-19 pandemic in Hungary

24 April 2021 31	Újpest	1 – 3	MTK Budapest	Budapest
19:30 CET	Tallo 35' (pen.)	Report	Schön 7'; Varga 76', 90+3'	Stadium: Szusza Ferenc Stadion; Attendance: 0 Referee: Péter Zierkelbach
Note: COVID-19 pandemic in Hungary

29 April 2021 32	MTK Budapest	1 – 3	Fehérvár	Budapest
20:00 CEST	Ferreira 89'	Report	Nikolić 18'; Zivzivadze 76'; Houri 82'	Stadium: Hidegkuti Nándor Stadion; Attendance: no spectators Referee: József Erdős
Note: COVID-19 pandemic in Hungary

7 May 2021 33	Mezőkövesd	5 – 1	MTK Budapest	Mezőkövesd
20:00 CEST	Jurina 17'; Nagy 42'; Ferreira 53' (o.g.); Vayda 62'; Vutov 64'	Report	Varga 79' (pen.)	Stadium: Mezőkövesdi Városi Stadion; Attendance: 358; Referee: Mihály Káprály
Note: COVID-19 pandemic in Hungary

=== Hungarian Cup ===
19 September 2020 Round 6	43.Sz.Építők	0 – 8	MTK Budapest	Budapest
15:00 CEST		Report	Mijovski 1', 60'; Lencse 19' (pen.), 24'; Prosser 23' (pen.), 52', 57'; Schön 86'	Stadium: Hévízi úti Stadion; Attendance: 800; Referee: Tamás Berényi

28 October 2020 Round of 64	Bátaszék	1 – 7	MTK Budapest	Bátaszék
12:30 CET	Tóth 44'	Report	Lencse 21', 26', 62'; Prosser 36'; Nagy 70'; Ikenne 75', 83'	Stadium: Vincze János Sportpálya; Referee: Máté Kubicsek

10 February 2021 Round of 32	Kazincbarcika	1 – 4	MTK Budapest	Kazincbarcika
13:00 CET	Kovács 47'	Report	Mezei 38', 65'; Varga 71'; Prosser 74'	Stadium: Pete András Stadion; Attendance: 0 Referee: János Takács

24 February 2021 Round of 16	Tállya	1 – 4	MTK Budapest	Tállya
13:00 CET	Nyitrai 71' (pen.)	Report	Prosser 18'; Bíró 26'; Dimitrov 48'; Kanta 51' (pen.)	Stadium: Tállyai Sporttelep; Attendance: 0 Referee: Bence Csonka

10 March 2021 Quarter-final	Debrecen	1 – 2	MTK Budapest	Debrecen
17:30 CET	Szécsi 46'	Report	Herrera 42'; Varga 50'	Stadium: Nagyerdei Stadion; Attendance: 0 Referee: Szabolcs Szilasi

15 April 2021 Semi-final	MTK Budapest	1 – 2	Fehérvár	Budapest
18:30 CET	Schön 14'	Report	Bolla 38'; Nikolić 52'	Stadium: Hidegkuti Nándor Stadion; Attendance: 0 Referee: Ádám Farkas

== Statistics ==
=== Appearances and goals ===
Last updated on 15 May 2021.

No.	Pos	Nat	Player	Total		OTP Bank Liga		Hungarian Cup	
No.	Pos	Nat	Player	Apps	Goals	Apps	Goals	Apps	Goals
1	GK	(Montenegro) MNE	Milan Mijatović	32	-48	32	-48	0	-0
2	DF	(Hungary) HUN	Benedek Varju	22	0	18	0	4	0
3	DF	(Finland) FIN	Nikolai Alho	16	0	13	0	3	0
4	DF	(Portugal) POR	Tiago Ferreira	18	1	16	1	2	0
5	DF	(Hungary) HUN	Zsombor Nagy	31	2	27	1	4	1
6	MF	(Hungary) HUN	Benjámin Cseke	32	2	29	2	3	0
7	MF	(Hungary) HUN	Szabolcs Schön	33	11	27	9	6	2
8	MF	(Hungary) HUN	Szabolcs Mezei	30	3	25	1	5	2
9	FW	(Hungary) HUN	Bence Bíró	20	1	16	0	4	1
10	MF	(Hungary) HUN	Martin Palincsár	24	0	19	0	5	0
11	FW	(Hungary) HUN	Roland Varga	20	11	17	9	3	2
13	FW	(Hungary) HUN	Zalán Vancsa	3	0	3	0	0	0
14	MF	(Hungary) HUN	Mihály Kata	28	1	24	1	4	0
15	DF	(Hungary) HUN	Szabolcs Barna	8	0	6	0	2	0
16	DF	(Colombia) COL	Sebastián Herrera	28	2	26	1	2	1
17	FW	(Hungary) HUN	Dániel Prosser	35	10	29	4	6	6
19	MF	(Hungary) HUN	József Kanta	10	1	5	0	5	1
20	DF	(Nigeria) NGR	George Ikenne	30	3	26	1	4	2
21	DF	(Hungary) HUN	Benjamin Balázs	20	0	16	0	4	0
22	DF	(Croatia) CRO	Marko Perković	16	0	13	0	3	0
23	FW	(Brazil) BRA	Myke Ramos	3	0	3	0	0	0
24	MF	(Serbia) SRB	Srđan Dimitrov	23	2	20	1	3	1
25	GK	(Hungary) HUN	Bence Somodi	8	-7	2	-1	6	-6
26	FW	(Bosnia and Herzegovina) BIH	Andrija Drljo	3	0	3	0	0	0
27	MF	(Hungary) HUN	Barnabás Biben	14	0	11	0	3	0
28	DF	(Hungary) HUN	Ádám Pintér	7	0	7	0	0	0
29	FW	(Ghana) GHA	Clinton Osei	5	0	3	0	2	0
30	FW	(North Macedonia) MKD	Bojan Miovski	29	9	26	7	3	2
31	DF	(Serbia) SRB	Filip Antonijević	3	0	2	0	1	0
77	DF	(Hungary) HUN	Ákos Baki	7	0	6	0	1	0
Youth players:
12	GK	(Hungary) HUN	Dániel Winter	0	0	0	-0	0	-0
13	DF	(Hungary) HUN	Roland Lehoczky	1	0	0	0	1	0
18	GK	(Hungary) HUN	Dániel Varasdi	0	0	0	-0	0	-0
33	GK	(Hungary) HUN	Szabolcs Velicskó	0	0	0	-0	0	-0
34	MF	(Hungary) HUN	Mátyás Kovács	0	0	0	0	0	0
35	MF	(Hungary) HUN	Artúr Horváth	0	0	0	0	0	0
Players no longer at the club:
11	MF	(Hungary) HUN	Dániel Gera	13	4	13	4	0	0
22	MF	(Hungary) HUN	Máté Katona	4	1	4	1	0	0
29	FW	(Hungary) HUN	László Lencse	9	5	7	0	2	5

=== Top scorers ===
Includes all competitive matches. The list is sorted by shirt number when total goals are equal.

Last updated on 15 May 2021

Position	Nation	Number	Name	OTP Bank Liga	Hungarian Cup	Total
1	(Hungary)	7	Szabolcs Schön	9	2	11
2	(Hungary)	11	Roland Varga	9	2	11
3	(Hungary)	17	Dániel Prosser	4	6	10
4	(North Macedonia)	30	Bojan Miovski	7	2	9
5	(Hungary)	29	László Lencse	0	5	5
6	(Hungary)	11	Dániel Gera	4	0	4
7	(Nigeria)	20	George Ikenne	1	2	3
8	(Hungary)	8	Szabolcs Mezei	1	2	3
9	(Hungary)	6	Benjámin Cseke	2	0	2
10	(Serbia)	24	Srđan Dimitrov	1	1	2
11	(Hungary)	5	Zsombor Nagy	1	1	2
12	(Colombia)	16	Sebastián Herrera	1	1	2
13	(Hungary)	22	Máté Katona	1	0	1
14	(Hungary)	14	Mihály Kata	1	0	1
15	(Portugal)	4	Tiago Ferreira	1	0	1
16	(Hungary)	9	Bence Bíró	0	1	1
17	(Hungary)	19	József Kanta	0	1	1
/	/	/	Own Goals	1	0	1
			TOTALS	44	26	70

=== Disciplinary record ===
Includes all competitive matches. Players with 1 card or more included only.

Last updated on 15 May 2021

Position	Nation	Number	Name	OTP Bank Liga		Hungarian Cup		Total (Hu Total)	
Position	Nation	Number	Name	Yellow card	Red card	Yellow card	Red card	Yellow card	Red card
GK	(Montenegro)	1	Milan Mijatović	3	0	0	0	3 (3)	0 (0)
DF	(Hungary)	2	Benedek Varju	4	0	0	0	4 (4)	0 (0)
DF	(Finland)	3	Nikolai Alho	0	1	0	0	0 (0)	1 (1)
DF	(Portugal)	4	Tiago Ferreira	3	0	0	0	3 (3)	0 (0)
DF	(Hungary)	5	Zsombor Nagy	4	0	0	0	4 (4)	0 (0)
MF	(Hungary)	6	Benjámin Cseke	3	0	1	0	4 (3)	0 (0)
MF	(Hungary)	7	Szabolcs Schön	7	0	1	0	8 (7)	0 (0)
MF	(Hungary)	8	Szabolcs Mezei	4	0	0	0	4 (4)	0 (0)
FW	(Hungary)	9	Bence Bíró	2	0	0	0	2 (2)	0 (0)
MF	(Hungary)	10	Martin Palincsár	1	0	0	0	1 (1)	0 (0)
FW	(Hungary)	11	Roland Varga	1	0	1	0	2 (1)	0 (0)
FW	(Hungary)	11	Dániel Gera	2	0	0	0	2 (2)	0 (0)
MF	(Hungary)	14	Mihály Kata	5	0	0	0	5 (5)	0 (0)
DF	(Colombia)	16	Sebastián Herrera	11	1	0	0	11 (11)	1 (1)
FW	(Hungary)	17	Dániel Prosser	1	0	0	0	1 (1)	0 (0)
DF	(Nigeria)	20	George Ikenne	3	0	0	0	3 (3)	0 (0)
DF	(Hungary)	21	Benjamin Balázs	1	0	0	0	1 (1)	0 (0)
DF	(Croatia)	22	Marko Perković	2	0	0	0	2 (2)	0 (0)
MF	(Serbia)	24	Srđan Dimitrov	6	0	2	0	8 (6)	0 (0)
DF	(Hungary)	28	Ádám Pintér	4	0	0	0	4 (4)	0 (0)
FW	(Ghana)	29	Osei Clinton	0	0	1	0	1 (0)	0 (0)
FW	(Hungary)	29	László Lencse	2	0	0	0	2 (2)	0 (0)
FW	(North Macedonia)	30	Bojan Miovski	7	0	0	0	7 (7)	0 (0)
DF	(Serbia)	31	Filip Antonijević	0	0	1	0	1 (0)	0 (0)
DF	(Hungary)	77	Ákos Baki	2	1	0	0	2 (2)	1 (1)
			TOTALS	77	3	7	0	84 (77)	3 (3)

=== Overall ===
Games played	39 (33 OTP Bank Liga and 6 Hungarian Cup)
Games won	16 (11 OTP Bank Liga and 5 Hungarian Cup)
Games drawn	9 (9 OTP Bank Liga and 0 Hungarian Cup)
Games lost	14 (13 OTP Bank Liga and 1 Hungarian Cup)
Goals scored	70
Goals conceded	55
Goal difference	+15
Yellow cards	84
Red cards	3
Worst discipline	(Colombia) Sebastián Herrera (11 (yellow card) , 1 (red card) )
Best result	8–0 (A) v 43.Sz.Építők - Hungarian Cup - 19-9-2020
Worst result	0–4 (A) v Paks - Nemzeti Bajnokság I - 26-9-2020
Worst result	1–5 (A) v Mezőkövesd - Nemzeti Bajnokság I - 7-5-2021
Most appearances	(Hungary) Dániel Prosser (34 appearances)
Top scorer	(Hungary) Szabolcs Schön (11 goals)
Top scorer	(Hungary) Roland Varga (11 goals)
Points	57/117 (48.71%)

Last updated: 15 May 2021
