= Slobodan Mihajlović =

Slobodan Mihajlović may refer to:

- Slobodan Mihajlović (footballer)
- Slobodan Mihajlović (politician)
