= Ádám Pintér =

Hungarian footballer (born 1988)

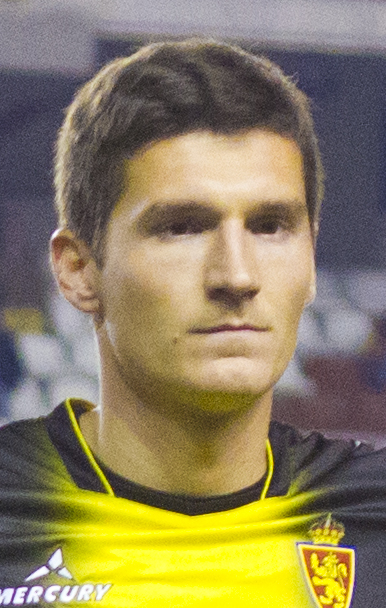
- Pintér with Zaragoza in 2012

Personal information
- Full name: Ádám József Pintér
- Date of birth: 12 June 1988 (age 38)
- Place of birth: Balassagyarmat, Hungary
- Height: 1.90 m (6 ft 3 in)
- Position: Midfielder

Team information
- Current team: MTK Budapest (assistant coach)

Youth career
- 2003–2004: Balassagyarmati VSE
- 2004–2006: MTK Budapest

Senior career*
Years	Team	Apps	(Gls)
2006–2010	MTK Budapest	92	(4)
2010–2013	Zaragoza	44	(0)
2013–2014	Tom Tomsk	10	(0)
2014–2015	Levadiakos	14	(0)
2015–2017	Ferencváros	29	(2)
2017–2018	Greuther Fürth	22	(0)
2018–2021	MTK Budapest	51	(0)

International career
2006–2007	Hungary U19	6	(0)
2007–2010	Hungary U21	7	(0)
2010–2018	Hungary	29	(0)

Managerial career
- 2021–: MTK Budapest (assistant)
- * Club domestic league appearances and goals

Ádám Pintér (born 12 June 1988) is a Hungarian professional football coach and a former midfielder. He is the assistant coach with MTK Budapest.

== Club career ==
=== MTK Budapest ===
His first team was MTK Budapest where he played for four seasons, from the age of 18.

=== Real Zaragoza ===
Spanish club, Real Zaragoza has signed him in 2010 for four seasons. In his first season with Zaragoza he played 9 matches. On 9 August 2013, Zaragoza and Pintér agreed to cancel his contract, and he became a free agent.

=== Tom Tomsk ===
On 2 September 2013, the last day of the transfer window, it was announced that Pintér had joined Tom Tomsk, signing a one-year contract. Pintér made his debut against Anzhi Makhachkala.

=== Levadiakos ===
On 5 August 2014, Pintér signed a two-year contract with Levadiakos playing in Super League Greece. On 31 July 2015, he terminated his contract with Levadiakos.

=== Ferencváros ===
On 19 August 2015, Pintér was signed by Hungarian first division club Ferencvárosi TC.

== International career ==
Pintér was selected for Hungary's Euro 2016 squad.

On 14 June 2016, Pintér played in the first group match in a 2–0 victory over Austria at the UEFA Euro 2016 Group F match at Nouveau Stade de Bordeaux, Bordeaux, France. He also played in the last group match in a 3–3 draw against Portugal at the Parc Olympique Lyonnais, Lyon on 22 June 2016.

== Career statistics ==
=== Club ===
As of match played 15 May 2021

Appearances and goals by club, season and competition
Club	Season	League			National Cup		League Cup		Europe		Total	
Club	Season	Division	Apps	Goals	Apps	Goals	Apps	Goals	Apps	Goals	Apps	Goals
MTK	2006–07	Nemzeti Bajnokság I	20	1	4	0	0	0	0	0	24	1
MTK	2007–08	Nemzeti Bajnokság I	26	2	0	0	0	0	0	0	26	2
MTK	2008–09	Nemzeti Bajnokság I	16	0	6	1	2	0	2	0	26	1
MTK	2009–10	Nemzeti Bajnokság I	26	0	6	1	2	0	0	0	34	1
MTK	2010–11	Nemzeti Bajnokság I	4	1	0	0	0	0	0	0	4	1
MTK	Total		92	4	16	2	4	0	2	0	114	6
Real Zaragoza	2010–11	La Liga	9	0	2	0	0	0	0	0	11	0
Real Zaragoza	2011–12	La Liga	17	0	0	0	0	0	0	0	17	0
Real Zaragoza	2012–13	La Liga	18	0	2	0	0	0	0	0	20	0
Real Zaragoza	Total		44	0	4	0	0	0	0	0	48	0
Tom Tomsk	2013–14	Russian Premier League	10	0	4	0	0	0	0	0	14	0
Levadiakos	2014–15	Super League Greece	14	0	3	0	0	0	0	0	17	0
Ferencváros	2015–16	Nemzeti Bajnokság I	18	2	7	1	0	0	0	0	25	3
Ferencváros	2016–17	Nemzeti Bajnokság I	11	0	0	0	0	0	2	0	13	0
Ferencváros	Total		29	2	7	1	0	0	2	0	38	3
Greuther Fürth	2016–17	2. Bundesliga	13	0	1	0	0	0	0	0	14	0
Greuther Fürth	2017–18	2. Bundesliga	10	0	0	0	0	0	0	0	10	0
Greuther Fürth	Total		23	0	1	0	0	0	0	0	24	0
MTK	2018–19	Nemzeti Bajnokság I	24	0	1	0	0	0	0	0	25	0
MTK	2019–20	Nemzeti Bajnokság II	20	0	4	0	0	0	0	0	24	0
MTK	2020–21	Nemzeti Bajnokság I	7	0	0	0	0	0	0	0	7	0
MTK	Total		51	0	5	0	0	0	0	0	56	0
Career total			263	6	40	3	4	0	4	0	311	9

=== International ===
As of match played 3 September 2017

Appearances and goals by national team and year
National team	Season	Apps	Goals
Hungary	2010	2	0
Hungary	2011	5	0
Hungary	2012	6	0
Hungary	2013	4	0
Hungary	2014	0	0
Hungary	2015	2	0
Hungary	2016	6	0
Hungary	2017	2	0
Hungary	2018	2	0
Total		29	0
