= Slobodan Mihajlović (footballer) =

Austrian footballer

Personal information
- Date of birth: 15 March 1997 (age 29)
- Place of birth: Austria
- Height: 1.77 m (5 ft 10 in)
- Position: Left midfielder

Team information
- Current team: Dornbirn
- Number: 77

Youth career
- 2006–2011: FC Wolfurt
- 2011–2015: AKA Vorarlberg

Senior career*
Years	Team	Apps	(Gls)
2015–2016	Horn	0	(0)
2016	→ Hard (loan)	13	(0)
2016–2018	Dornbirn	54	(3)
2019	MTK Budapest	5	(0)
2020–2021	Grazer AK	30	(5)
2021–2022	Floridsdorfer AC	16	(0)
2022–2023	Brühl	30	(3)
2023–2024	Schwarz-Weiß Bregenz	21	(0)
2024	DSV Leoben	2	(0)
2025	USV Eschen/Mauren	5	(0)
2025–	Dornbirn	14	(1)
- * Club domestic league appearances and goals as of 26 June 2026

Slobodan Mihajlović (born 15 March 1997) is an Austrian football player who plays as left midfielder for Dornbirn.

== Career ==
Mihajlović started his career at FC Wolfurt. From the 2011/12 season, he played for AKA Vorarlberg. During the winter break of the 2014/15 season, he moved to Austrian Football Second League club SV Horn. However, he never played an official game for the club and for that reason, he moved to FC Hard on loan during the winter break of the 2015/16 season.

In March 2016 he made his debut in the Austrian Regionalliga when he was in the starting line-up against USK Anif on matchday 17 and was replaced by Michael Vonbrül at half-time. After the loan ended in the summer of 2016, however, he did not return to SV Horn who had been promoted to the Austrian Football Second League, but moved to the Regionalliga club FC Dornbirn 1913. He scored his first goal for Dornbirn in the Regionalliga in November 2016 in a 3–0 win against Salzburger AK 1914.

After two years and 54 Regionalliga appearances, Mihajlovic left Dornbirn after the 2017/18 season. After six months without a club, he moved to Hungary to join Nemzeti Bajnokság I club MTK Budapest FC in January 2019. In March 2019, he made his debut in the Nemzeti Bajnokság when he came on as a substitute for Patrik Vass in the 88th minute against Újpest Budapest on matchday 23 of the 2018/19 season. With MTK he rose at the end of the season from the Nemzeti Bajnokság, whereupon he left the club.

After six months without a club, he returned to Austria in January 2020 and moved to the second division team Grazer AK, with whom he received a contract that ran until June 2021.

On 9 June 2021 he moved to Floridsdorfer AC.

In July 2022 Mihajlović moved to Brühl in Switzerland.

== Club statistics ==
Club	Season	League		Cup		Europe		Total	
Club	Season	Apps	Goals	Apps	Goals	Apps	Goals	Apps	Goals
Hard
Hard	2015–16	13	0	0	0	–	–	13	0
Hard	Total	13	0	0	0	–	–	13	0
Dornbirn
Dornbirn	2016–17	29	1	1	0	–	–	30	1
Dornbirn	2017–18	25	2	1	0	–	–	26	2
Dornbirn	Total	54	3	2	0	–	–	56	3
MTK Budapest
MTK Budapest	2018–19	5	0	0	0	–	–	5	0
MTK Budapest	Total	5	0	0	0	–	–	5	0
Career Total		72	3	2	0	0	0	74	3

Updated to games played as of 19 May 2019.
