= Artem Kychak =

Ukrainian footballer

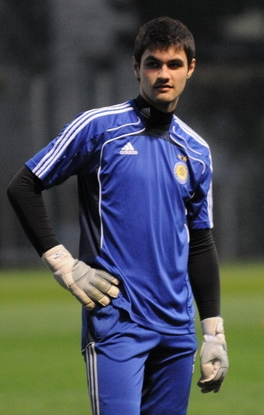

Personal information
- Full name: Artem Ivanovych Kychak
- Date of birth: 16 May 1989 (age 37)
- Place of birth: Vinnytsia, Soviet Union (now Ukraine)
- Height: 1.98 m (6 ft 6 in)
- Position: Goalkeeper

Team information
- Current team: Bukovyna Chernivtsi (GK coach)

Youth career
- 2001–2003: Nyva-Svitanok Vinnytsia
- 2003–2006: Dynamo Kyiv

Senior career*
| Years | Team | Apps | (Gls) |
| 2006–2013 | Dynamo Kyiv | 1 | (0) |
| 2006–2008 | → Dynamo-3 Kyiv | 24 | (0) |
| 2007–2011 | → Dynamo-2 Kyiv | 55 | (0) |
| 2013–2017 | Volyn Lutsk | 39 | (0) |
| 2017–2018 | Olimpik Donetsk | 8 | (0) |
| 2018–2019 | MTK Budapest | 25 | (0) |
| 2019–2021 | Olimpik Donetsk | 22 | (0) |
| 2021–2022 | Veres Rivne | 1 | (0) |
| 2022–2025 | Obolon Kyiv | 13 | (0) |
| Total | | 188 | (0) |

International career^{‡}
| 2004 | Ukraine U15 | 1 | (0) |
| 2004–2005 | Ukraine U16 | 11 | (0) |
| 2005–2006 | Ukraine U17 | 10 | (0) |
| 2006–2007 | Ukraine U18 | 6 | (0) |
| 2007–2008 | Ukraine U19 | 12 | (0) |

Managerial career
- 2025–: Bukovyna Chernivtsi (GK coach)
- * Club domestic league appearances and goals as of 6 August 2025 ‡ National team caps and goals as of 23 July 2022

Artem Ivanovych Kychak (Ukrainian: Артем Іванович Кичак; born 16 May 1989) is a Ukrainian retired professional footballer who works as a goalkeeper coach for Bukovyna Chernivtsi.

== Career ==
Kychak's first professional club was Dynamo Kyiv, but didn't play any match for the main team. In 2010, he was close for signing a contract with Metalurh Zaporizhzhia in the Ukrainian Premier League, but the deal was called off.

== International career ==
He was called up to Ukraine national under-21 football team for some matches during 2009, but not selected for game.
