= Gergő Gengeliczki =

Hungarian footballer (born 1993)

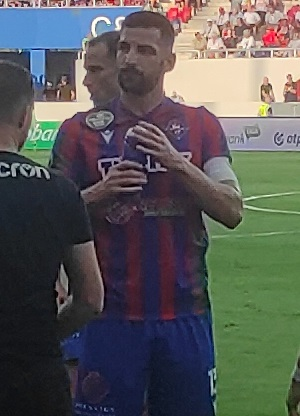
- Gengeliczki with Nyíregyháza in 2024

Personal information
- Date of birth: 8 June 1993 (age 33)
- Place of birth: Budapest, Hungary
- Height: 1.95 m (6 ft 5 in)
- Position: Centre back

Team information
- Current team: Nyíregyháza
- Number: 13

Youth career
- 2007–2013: Honvéd

Senior career*
Years	Team	Apps	(Gls)
2011–2013	Honvéd II	31	(3)
2013–2015	Nyíregyháza	37	(4)
2015	→ Mezőkövesd (loan)	9	(1)
2015–2016	Dunaújváros	10	(0)
2016–2017	Soroksár	52	(5)
2017–2019	MTK Budapest	55	(2)
2019–2020	Győri ETO FC	19	(0)
2020–2022	Soroksár	29	(1)
2022–	Nyíregyháza	83	(4)
- * Club domestic league appearances and goals as of 3 December 2024

Gergő Gengeliczki (born 8 June 1993) is a Hungarian football player who plays for Nyíregyháza.

== Career statistics ==
Appearances and goals by club, season and competition
Club	Season	League			Cup		League Cup		Europe		Total	
Club	Season	Division	Apps	Goals	Apps	Goals	Apps	Goals	Apps	Goals	Apps	Goals
Honvéd	2011–12	Nemzeti Bajnokság I	0	0	1	0	1	0	0	0	2	0
Honvéd II
Honvéd II	2011–12	Nemzeti Bajnokság II	16	0	0	0	0	0	0	0	16	0
Honvéd II	2012–13	Nemzeti Bajnokság II	25	3	0	0	0	0	0	0	25	3
Honvéd II	Total		41	3	0	0	0	0	0	0	41	3
Nyíregyháza
Nyíregyháza	2013–14	Nemzeti Bajnokság II	27	4	7	0	2	0	0	0	36	4
Nyíregyháza	2014–15	Nemzeti Bajnokság I	11	0	2	0	5	0	0	0	17	0
Nyíregyháza	Total		38	4	8	0	7	0	0	0	53	4
Mezőkövesd	2014–15	Nemzeti Bajnokság II	9	1	0	0	0	0	0	0	9	1
Dunaújváros	2015–16	Nemzeti Bajnokság II	10	0	0	0	—		—		10	0
Soroksár
Soroksár	2015–16	Nemzeti Bajnokság II	15	2	0	0	—		—		15	2
Soroksár	2016–17	Nemzeti Bajnokság II	37	3	2	1	—		—		39	4
Soroksár	Total		52	5	2	1	—		—		54	6
MTK Budapest
MTK Budapest	2017–18	Nemzeti Bajnokság II	36	2	6	0	—		—		42	2
MTK Budapest	2018–19	Nemzeti Bajnokság I	19	0	2	0	—		—		21	0
MTK Budapest	Total		55	2	8	0	—		—		63	2
Career total			205	15	19	1	8	0	0	0	232	16

Updated to games played as of 19 May 2019.
