= István Szatmári =

Hungarian footballer (born 1997)

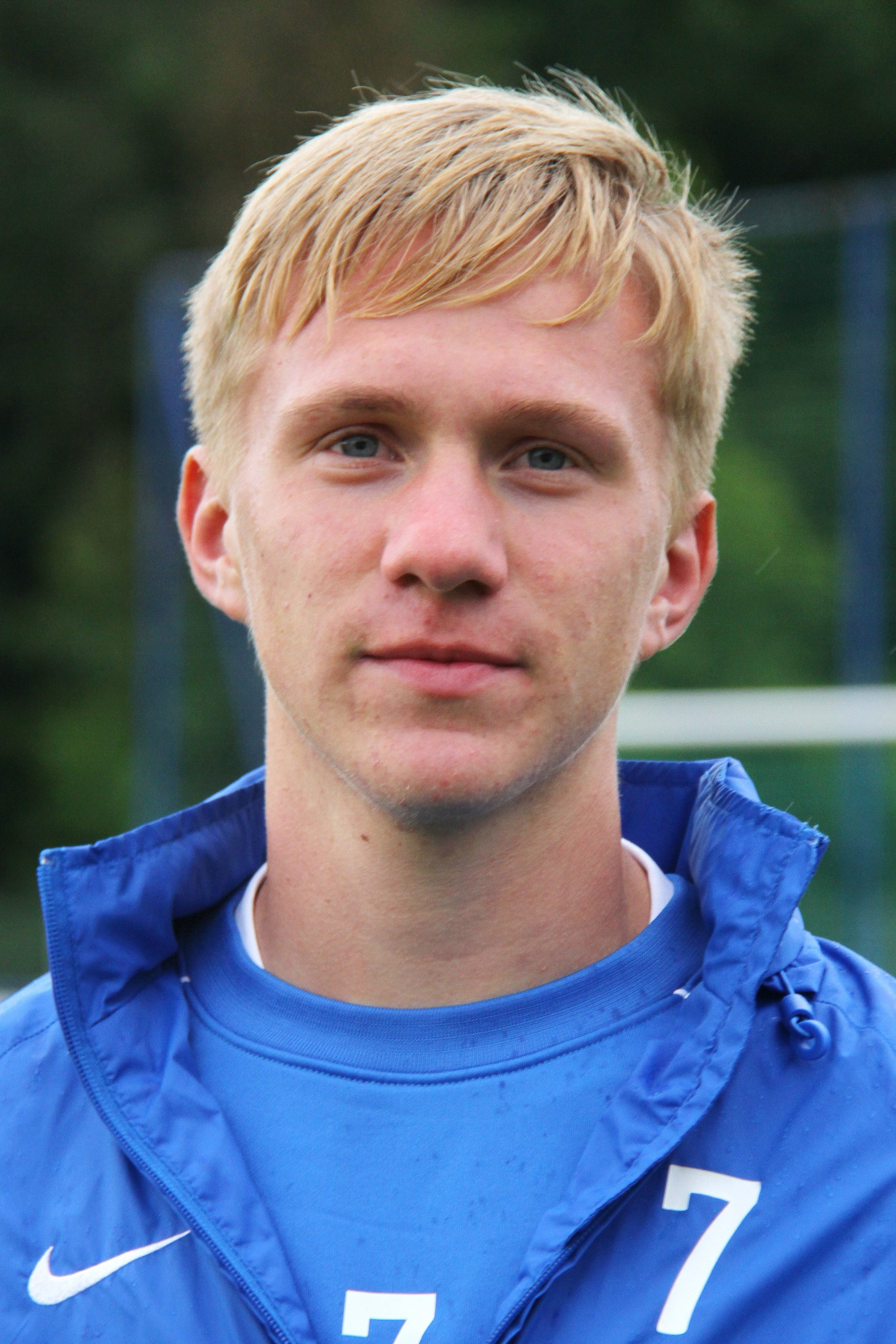
- Szatmári in 2016.

Personal information
- Date of birth: 23 May 1997 (age 29)
- Place of birth: Miskolc, Hungary
- Height: 1.85 m (6 ft 1 in)
- Position: Left midfielder

Youth career
- 2002–2008: Diósgyőr
- 2008–2010: Vasas
- 2010–2015: MTK Budapest

Senior career*
Years	Team	Apps	(Gls)
2015–2020	MTK Budapest	22	(3)
2015–2017	→ MTK Budapest II	34	(14)
2017	→ Zalaegerszeg (loan)	13	(0)
2017–2019	→ Békéscsaba (loan)	67	(21)
2020–2023	Gyirmót	22	(3)
2020–2023	Gyirmót II	16	(3)
2024	Békéscsaba	10	(1)

International career
2015	Hungary U-18	3	(0)
2015	Hungary U-19	5	(4)
- * Club domestic league appearances and goals as of 1 June 2025

István Szatmári (born 23 May 1997) is a Hungarian football player.

== Club career ==
He made his Nemzeti Bajnokság I debut for MTK Budapest on 31 May 2015 in a game against Diósgyőr.

== Career statistics ==
As of 15 May 2022.

Appearances and goals by club, season and competition
Club	Season	League			Cup		Continental		Other		Total	
Club	Season	Division	Apps	Goals	Apps	Goals	Apps	Goals	Apps	Goals	Apps	Goals
MTK Budapest II	2015–16	Nemzeti Bajnokság III	25	8	—		—		0	0	25	8
MTK Budapest II	2016–17	Nemzeti Bajnokság III	9	6	—		—		0	0	9	6
MTK Budapest II	Total		34	14	0	0	0	0	0	0	34	14
Zalaegerszeg	2016–17	Nemzeti Bajnokság II	13	0	0	0	—		0	0	13	0
Zalaegerszeg	Total		13	0	0	0	0	0	0	0	13	0
Békéscsaba	2017–18	Nemzeti Bajnokság II	30	6	4	1	—		0	0	34	7
Békéscsaba	2018–19	Nemzeti Bajnokság II	37	15	2	0	—		0	0	39	15
Békéscsaba	Total		67	21	6	1	0	0	0	0	73	22
MTK Budapest	2014–15	Nemzeti Bajnokság I	1	0	0	0	—		1	0	2	0
MTK Budapest	2015–16	Nemzeti Bajnokság I	1	0	1	0	—		0	0	2	0
MTK Budapest	2016–17	Nemzeti Bajnokság I	10	0	3	0	—		0	0	13	0
MTK Budapest	2019–20	Nemzeti Bajnokság II	10	3	3	2	—		0	0	13	5
MTK Budapest	Total		22	3	7	2	0	0	1	0	30	5
Gyirmót	2020–21	Nemzeti Bajnokság II	22	3	1	0	—		0	0	23	3
Gyirmót	2021–22	Nemzeti Bajnokság I	0	0	0	0	—		0	0	0	0
Gyirmót	Total		22	3	1	0	0	0	0	0	23	3
Career total			158	41	14	3	0	0	0	0	173	44
