= Nasiru Banahene =

Ghanaian footballer

Personal information
- Full name: Nasiru Zakaria Banahene
- Date of birth: 8 July 2000 (age 26)
- Place of birth: Accra, Ghana
- Position: Right-back

Team information
- Current team: Honka
- Number: 24

Youth career
- 2009-2016: Kumasi Barcelona Football Club
- 2016-2018: Ocheman Planners
- 2018: Liberty Professionals

Senior career*
Years	Team	Apps	(Gls)
2018	Liberty Professionals	9	(0)
2018–2020	MTK Budapest	5	(0)
2019	→ Honka II (loan)	2	(0)
2019–2020	→ Honka (loan)	5	(0)
2020–2023	Honka	44	(4)
2021–2023	Honka II	3	(0)
- * Club domestic league appearances and goals as of 25 October 2023 (UTC)

Nasiru Zakaria Banahene (born 8 July 2000) is a Ghanaian footballer who plays as a right-back for Finnish club Honka

== Career ==
=== Early life ===
Born in Accra, Banahene started his career at the age of 9 with local club Kumasi Barcelona Football Club based in Kumasi, Ghana. He was there with childhood friend Mohammed Salisu. Banahene then moved to Ocheman Planners before progressing on to the youth academy of Accra-based club Liberty Professionals.

=== MTK Budapest ===
In February 2019, he joined Hungarian club MTK Budapest. However, MTK decided to loan Banahene out during the summer due to a lack of playing time.

=== FC Honka ===
On 9 August 2019, Banahene joined Finnish club Honka on an initial loan deal for the rest of 2019 with an option to buy. In July 2020, Honka exercised their buy option with Banahene signing a three-year deal.

== Club statistics ==
As of match played 31 December 2023

Appearances and goals by club, season and competition
Club	Season	League			Cup (Note: Includes Suomen Cup)		Continental		Total	
Club	Season	Division	Apps	Goals	Apps	Goals	Apps	Goals	Apps	Goals
Liberty Professionals	2018	Ghana Premier League	8	0	—		—		8	0
MTK Budapest	2018–19	NB I	5	0	0	0	—		5	0
Honka II (loan)	2019	Kakkonen	2	0	0	0	—		2	0
Honka (loan)	2019	Veikkausliiga	5	0	—		—		5	0
Honka (loan)	2020	Veikkausliiga	8	2	7	0	0	0	15	2
Honka (loan)	Total		13	2	7	0	0	0	20	2
Honka II	2021	Kakkonen	1	0	—		—		1	0
Honka II	2022	Kakkonen	1	0	—		—		1	0
Honka II	2023	Kakkonen	1	0	—		—		1	0
Honka II	Total		3	0	–	–	–	–	3	0
Honka	2021	Veikkausliiga	22	0	6	1	2 (Note: Includes UEFA Europa Conference League)	0	30	1
Honka	2022	Veikkausliiga	0	0	0	0	–		0	0
Honka	2023	Veikkausliiga	14	2	5	0	2	0	21	2
Honka	Total		36	2	11	1	4	0	51	3
Career total			67	4	18	1	4	0	89	5
