= Bence Deutsch =

Hungarian professional footballer

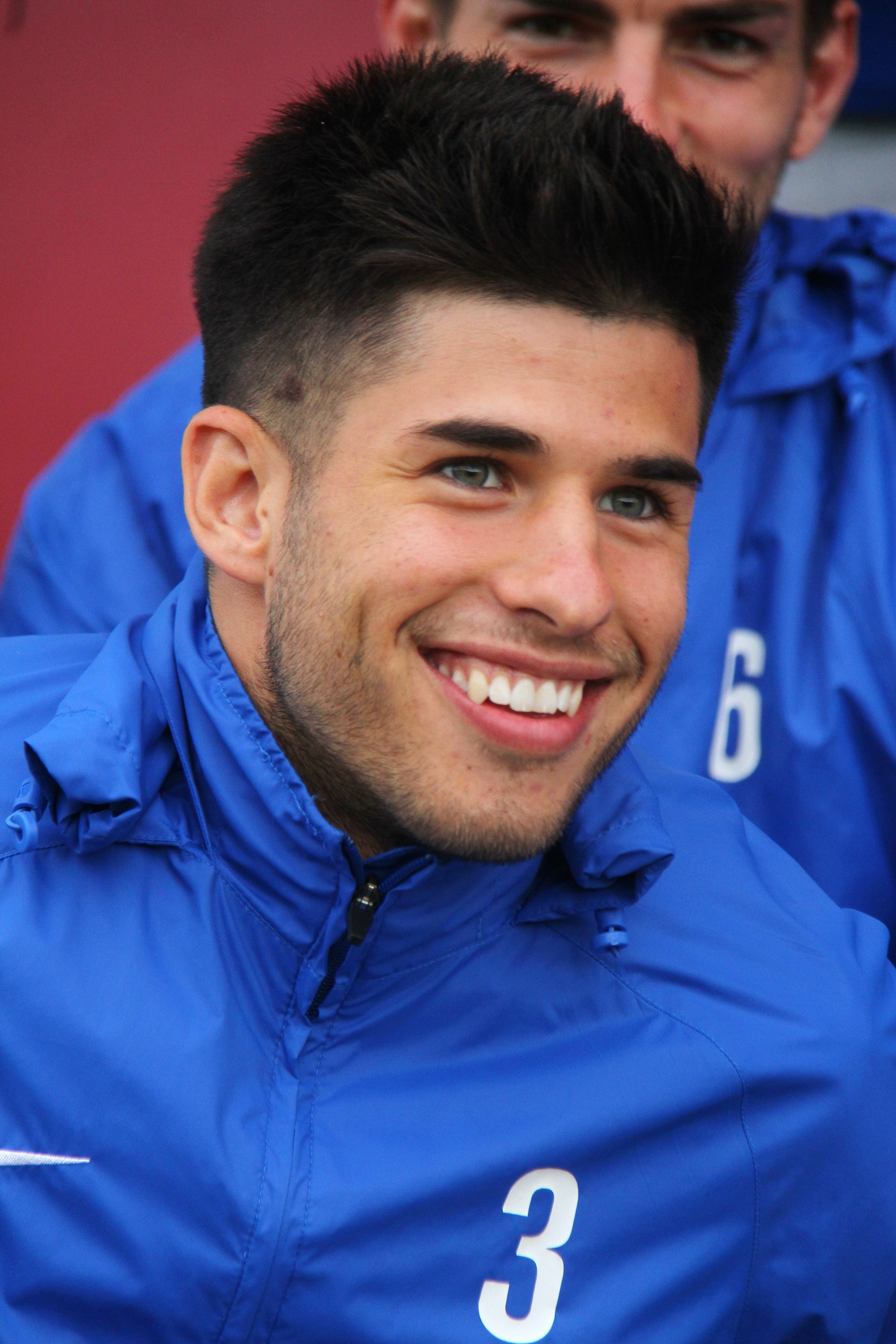
- Deutsch with MTK Budapest in 2016

Personal information
- Date of birth: 4 August 1992 (age 34)
- Place of birth: Budapest, Hungary
- Height: 1.85 m (6 ft 1 in)
- Position: Left back

Team information
- Current team: Tatabánya
- Number: 30

Youth career
- 2004–2012: MTK Budapest

Senior career*
Years	Team	Apps	(Gls)
2012–2020	MTK Budapest	60	(3)
2012–2013	→ Szigetszentmiklós (loan)	31	(4)
2013	→ Pécs (loan)	4	(0)
2014	→ Szigetszentmiklós (loan)	12	(1)
2016–2017	→ Zalaegerszeg (loan)	36	(5)
2020–2022	Siófok	46	(2)
2022–2024	Nyíregyháza	18	(0)
2024	BVSC-Zugló	12	(0)
2024–	Tatabánya	21	(0)

International career
2009–2010	Hungary U18		
2012–2013	Hungary U21	1	(0)
- * Club domestic league appearances and goals as of 24 May 2025

Bence Deutsch (born 4 August 1992) is a Hungarian professional footballer who plays for Tatabánya. His father is Tamás Deutsch, a politician and chairman of the MTK Budapest FC.

== Club career ==
On 1 July 2022, Deutsch joined Nyíregyháza on a two-year contract.

== Career statistics ==
Appearances and goals by club, season and competition
Club	Season	League			Cup		League Cup		Europe		Total	
Club	Season	Division	Apps	Goals	Apps	Goals	Apps	Goals	Apps	Goals	Apps	Goals
Szigetszentmiklós
Szigetszentmiklós	2011–12	Nemzeti Bajnokság II	8	1	0	0	0	0	0	0	8	1
Szigetszentmiklós	2012–13	Nemzeti Bajnokság II	23	3	1	0	0	0	0	0	24	3
Szigetszentmiklós	2012–13	Nemzeti Bajnokság II	12	1	0	0	0	0	0	0	12	1
Szigetszentmiklós	Total		43	5	1	0	0	0	0	0	44	5
Pécs	2013–14	Nemzeti Bajnokság I	4	0	2	0	9	1	0	0	15	1
Zalaegerszeg	2016–17	Nemzeti Bajnokság II	36	5	4	0	—		—		40	5
MTK
MTK	2014–15	Nemzeti Bajnokság I	0	0	2	0	7	0	0	0	9	0
MTK	2015–16	Nemzeti Bajnokság I	9	0	2	0	—		—		11	0
MTK	2017–18	Nemzeti Bajnokság II	33	2	3	1	—		—		36	3
MTK	2018–19	Nemzeti Bajnokság I	7	0	0	0	—		—		7	0
MTK	2019–20	Nemzeti Bajnokság II	11	1	4	0	—		—		15	1
MTK	Total		60	3	11	1	7	0	0	0	78	4
Career total			143	13	18	1	16	1	0	0	177	15

Updated to games played as of 26 May 2020.
