= Myke Ramos =

Brazilian footballer (born 1992)

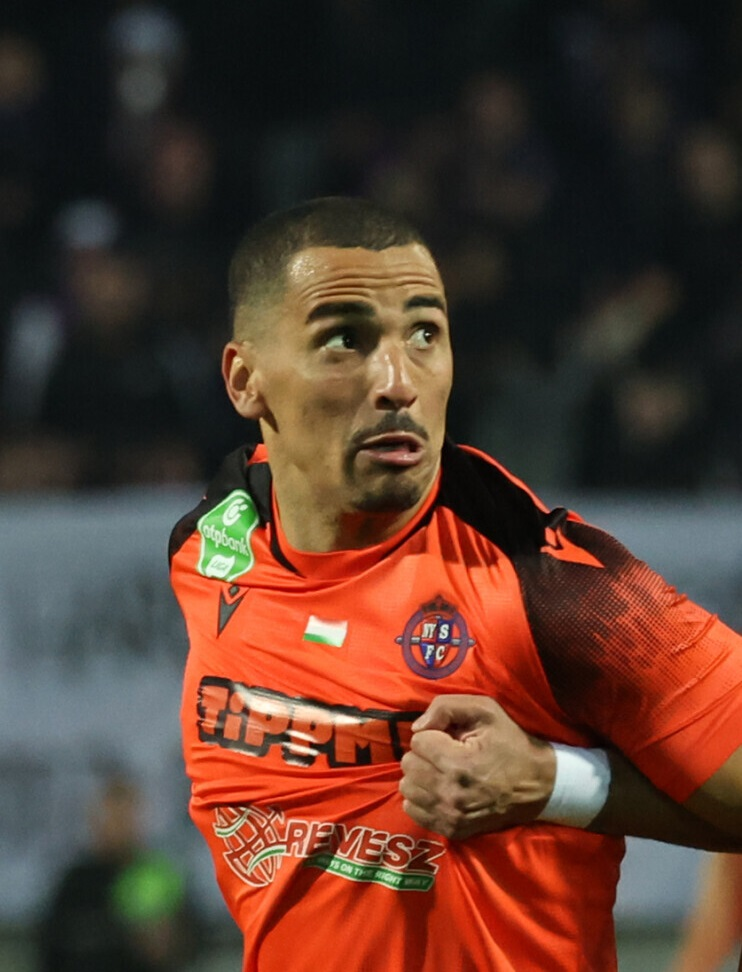
- Ramos playing for Nyíregyháza in 2024

Personal information
- Full name: Myke Bouard Ramos
- Date of birth: 30 October 1992 (age 34)
- Place of birth: Curitiba, Brazil
- Height: 1.85 m (6 ft 1 in)
- Positions: Forward; winger

Team information
- Current team: Tiszakécske
- Number: 7

Senior career*
Years	Team	Apps	(Gls)
2012–2013	Paraná Clube		
2013	Salgótarján	13	(12)
2013–2014	Kisvárda	16	(8)
2014–2022	MTK Budapest	47	(7)
2014–2015	→ Kisvárda (loan)	23	(13)
2017–2018	→ Haladás (loan)	21	(4)
2018–2019	→ Ittihad Kalba (loan)	19	(10)
2022–2025	Nyíregyháza	40	(10)
2025	Kazincbarcika	15	(13)
2025–	Tiszakécske	28	(11)
- * Club domestic league appearances and goals as of 31 May 2026

Myke Bouard Ramos (born 30 October 1992) is a Brazilian footballer who plays as a forward for Hungarian Nemzeti Bajnokság II club Tiszakécske.

== Senior career ==
Starting in local club Paraná Clube, he then moved to Hungary to play for Salgótarjáni BTC where he achieved a twelve goals in thirteen competitive games for the aforementioned outfit. The following season he signed for Varda SE. He missed some matches while recovering from a crucial ankle ligament tear.

On 5 July 2022, Myke signed a one-year contract, with an option to extend for one more year, with Nyíregyháza.

== Club statistics ==
Club	Season	League		Cup		League Cup		Europe		Total	
Club	Season	Apps	Goals	Apps	Goals	Apps	Goals	Apps	Goals	Apps	Goals
Salgótarján
Salgótarján	2012–13	13	12	3	4	–	–	–	–	16	16
Salgótarján	Total	13	12	3	4	0	0	0	0	16	16
Kisvárda
Kisvárda	2013–14	16	8	3	3	4	0	–	–	23	11
Kisvárda	2014–15	23	13	4	3	–	–	–	–	27	16
Kisvárda	Total	39	21	7	6	4	0	0	0	50	27
Haladás
Haladás	2017–18	21	4	0	0	–	–	–	–	21	4
Haladás	Total	21	4	0	0	0	0	0	0	21	4
MTK Budapest
MTK Budapest	2015–16	19	2	2	1	–	–	2	0	23	3
MTK Budapest	2016–17	21	3	2	1	–	–	0	0	23	4
MTK Budapest	2018–19	4	2	0	0	–	–	–	–	4	2
MTK Budapest	2020–21	3	0	0	0	–	–	–	–	3	0
MTK Budapest	Total	47	7	4	2	0	0	2	0	53	9
Al-Ittihad
Al-Ittihad	2018–19	9	4	2	1	–	–	–	–	11	5
Al-Ittihad	Total	9	4	2	1	0	0	0	0	11	5
Tiszakécske
Tiszakécske	2025–26	0	0	0	0	–		–		0	0
Tiszakécske	Total	0	0	0	0	–		–		0	0
Career Total		129	48	16	13	4	0	2	0	151	61

Updated to games played as of 15 May 2021.
