= Ákos Baki =

Hungarian footballer

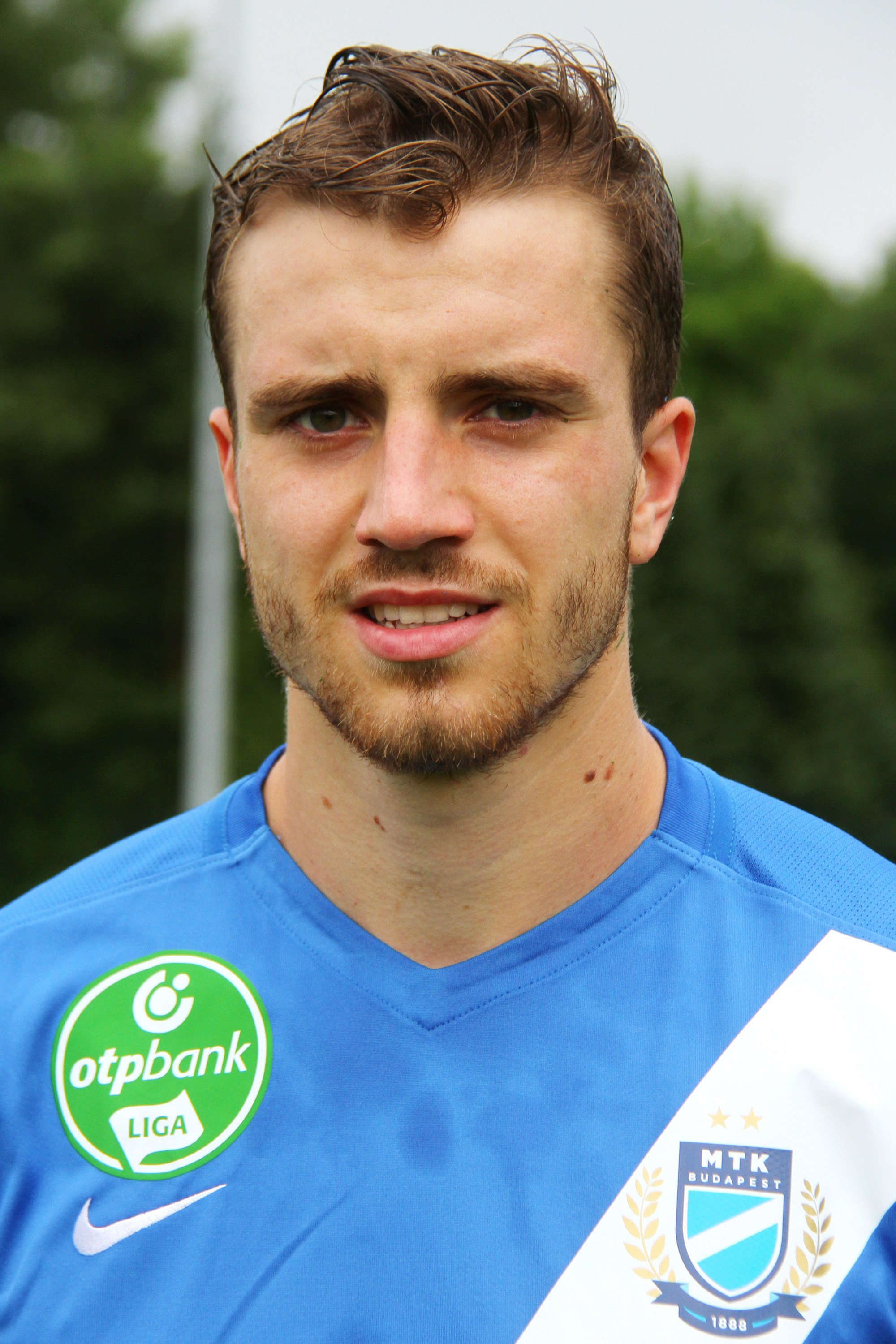
- Baki with MTK Budapest in 2016

Personal information
- Date of birth: 24 August 1994 (age 32)
- Place of birth: Zalaegerszeg, Hungary
- Height: 1.94 m (6 ft 4 in)
- Position: Defender

Team information
- Current team: Budapest Honvéd
- Number: 44

Youth career
- 2002–2009: Zalaegerszeg
- 2009–2013: MTK Budapest

Senior career*
Years	Team	Apps	(Gls)
2013–2021	MTK Budapest	91	(8)
2013–2017	→ MTK Budapest II	11	(0)
2021–2022	Mezőkövesd	1	(0)
2022	MTK Budapest II	6	(0)
2022–2024	Nyíregyháza	68	(5)
2025–	Budapest Honvéd	32	(3)

International career^{‡}
2015–2016	Hungary U21	2	(0)
- * Club domestic league appearances and goals as of 31 May 2026 ‡ National team caps and goals as of 3 April 2016

Ákos Baki (born 24 August 1994) is a Hungarian professional footballer who plays for Budapest Honvéd.

== Club career ==
In December 2013, Baki had a trial with English Premier League club Swansea City

On 27 June 2022, Baki signed with Nyíregyháza.

== Club statistics ==
Appearances and goals by club, season and competition
Club	Season	League			Cup		League Cup		Europe		Total	
Club	Season	Division	Apps	Goals	Apps	Goals	Apps	Goals	Apps	Goals	Apps	Goals
MTK Budapest II
MTK Budapest II	2012–13	Nemzeti Bajnokság III	3	0	0	0	—		—		3	0
MTK Budapest II	2015–16	Nemzeti Bajnokság III	5	0	0	0	—		—		5	0
MTK Budapest II	2016–17	Nemzeti Bajnokság III	3	0	0	0	—		—		3	0
MTK Budapest II	Total		11	0	0	0	0	0	0	0	11	0
MTK Budapest
MTK Budapest	2013–14	Nemzeti Bajnokság I	4	0	2	0	5	0	—		11	0
MTK Budapest	2014–15	Nemzeti Bajnokság I	10	0	0	0	5	0	—		15	0
MTK Budapest	2015–16	Nemzeti Bajnokság I	18	1	1	0	—		0	0	19	1
MTK Budapest	2016–17	Nemzeti Bajnokság I	27	1	2	0	—		4	0	33	1
MTK Budapest	2017–18	Nemzeti Bajnokság II	7	1	3	1	—		—		10	2
MTK Budapest	2018–19	Nemzeti Bajnokság I	10	2	2	0	—		—		12	2
MTK Budapest	2019–20	Nemzeti Bajnokság II	8	3	3	0	—		—		11	3
MTK Budapest	2020–21	Nemzeti Bajnokság I	6	0	1	0	—		—		7	0
MTK Budapest	2021–22	Nemzeti Bajnokság I	1	0	0	0	—		—		1	0
MTK Budapest	Total		91	8	14	1	10	0	4	0	119	9
Career total			102	8	14	1	10	0	4	0	130	9

Updated to games played as of 28 August 2021.
