= Anton Bidzilya =

Hungarian football player

Personal information
- Date of birth: 7 June 2000 (age 26)
- Place of birth: Uzhhorod, Ukraine
- Height: 1.75 m (5 ft 9 in)
- Position: Attacking midfielder

Team information
- Current team: DEAC
- Number: 70

Youth career
- 2014–2016: Debrecen
- 2016–2018: MTK Budapest

Senior career*
Years	Team	Apps	(Gls)
2018	MTK Budapest II	3	(0)
2018–2021	MTK Budapest	3	(0)
2019–2020	→ Békéscsaba (loan)	21	(1)
2021	→ Kaposvár (loan)	9	(0)
2021–	DEAC	44	(6)

International career
2016–2017	Hungary U17	3	(1)
- * Club domestic league appearances and goals as of 20:50, 4 June 2023 (UTC)

Anton Bidzilya (born 7 June 2000) is a Hungarian football player who plays as an attacking midfielder for DEAC.

== Career statistics ==
As of matches played 19 May 2019

Club	Season	League			Cup		Europe		Total	
Club	Season	Division	Apps	Goals	Apps	Goals	Apps	Goals	Apps	Goals
MTK Budapest	2017–18	Nemzeti Bajnokság II	1	0	0	0	—		1	0
MTK Budapest	2018–19	Nemzeti Bajnokság I	2	0	1	0	—		3	0
Career total			3	0	1	0	0	0	4	0
