= Patrik Vass =

Hungarian footballer

Personal information
- Full name: Patrik Ádám Vass
- Date of birth: 17 January 1993 (age 33)
- Place of birth: Budapest, Hungary
- Height: 1.68 m (5 ft 6 in)
- Position: Right midfielder

Team information
- Current team: Tatabánya
- Number: 17

Youth career
- 2000–2003: Újpest
- 2003–2011: MTK Budapest

Senior career*
Years	Team	Apps	(Gls)
2011–2015	MTK Budapest	76	(10)
2015	→ Vasas (loan)	13	(2)
2015–2017	Gyirmót	44	(6)
2017–2020	MTK Budapest	76	(16)
2020–2021	Zalaegerszeg	22	(1)
2021–2024	Nyíregyháza	61	(6)
2024–	Tatabánya	17	(0)

International career
2008–2010	Hungary U-17	6	(1)
2010–2011	Hungary U-18	4	(0)
2011–2013	Hungary U-19	4	(1)
2014	Hungary U-21	3	(0)
- * Club domestic league appearances and goals as of 25 May 2025

Patrik Vass (born 17 January 1993) is a Hungarian football player who plays for Tatabánya.

== Career statistics ==
Appearances and goals by club, season and competition
Club	Season	League			Cup		League Cup		Europe		Total	
Club	Season	Division	Apps	Goals	Apps	Goals	Apps	Goals	Apps	Goals	Apps	Goals
MTK
MTK	2011–12	Nemzeti Bajnokság II	20	3	7	0	6	1	0	0	33	4
MTK	2012–13	Nemzeti Bajnokság I	21	4	0	0	6	0	1	0	28	4
MTK	2013–14	Nemzeti Bajnokság I	24	2	7	1	2	0	0	0	33	3
MTK	2014–15	Nemzeti Bajnokság I	11	1	1	1	6	3	0	0	18	5
MTK	2017–18	Nemzeti Bajnokság II	37	10	4	1	—		—		41	11
MTK	2018–19	Nemzeti Bajnokság I	22	1	2	1	—		—		24	2
MTK	2019–20	Nemzeti Bajnokság II	19	6	2	0	—		—		21	6
MTK	Total		154	27	23	4	20	4	1	0	198	35
Vasas	2014–15	Nemzeti Bajnokság II	13	2	0	0	0	0	0	0	13	2
Gyirmót
Gyirmót	2015–16	Nemzeti Bajnokság II	24	5	2	0	—		—		26	5
Gyirmót	2016–17	Nemzeti Bajnokság I	20	1	3	1	—		—		23	2
Gyirmót	Total		44	6	5	1	0	0	0	0	49	7
Zalaegerszeg	2020–21	Nemzeti Bajnokság I	22	1	1	0	—		—		23	1
Nyíregyháza	2021–22	Nemzeti Bajnokság II	20	2	1	0	—		—		21	2
Career total			253	38	30	5	20	4	1	0	304	47

Updated to games played as of 7 February 2022.
