= 2016–17 MTK Budapest FC season =

MTK
2016–17 season
- Chairman: Péter Deutsch
- Manager: Vaszilisz Teodoru (until 20 December 2016); Zsolt Tamási (from 20 December 2016)
- Stadium: Dunaújvárosi Stadion (Note: MTK temporarily played their home matches at Dunaújvárosi Stadion in Dunaújváros, instead of their regular stadium, the Hidegkuti Nándor Stadion in Budapest, built in 1947 which was demolished to make way to the newly built Hidegkuti Nándor Stadion.); Ménfői úti Stadion (Note: MTK played their UEFA Europe League qualifying matches at the Ménfői úti Stadion in Győr, instead of their regular stadium, the Hidegkuti Nándor Stadion in Budapest, built in 1947 which was demolished to make way to the newly built Hidegkuti Nándor Stadion.) (Temporary stadiums); Hidegkuti Nándor Stadion (New stadium)
- Nemzeti Bajnokság I: 11th (relegated)
- Magyar Kupa: Round of 32
- UEFA Europa League: Second qualifying round
- Top goalscorer: League: Sándor Torghelle (9); All: Sándor Torghelle (11)
- Highest home attendance: 4,368 v Ferencváros (6 May 2017, Nemzeti Bajnokság I)
- Lowest home attendance: 316 v Haladás (7 August 2016, Nemzeti Bajnokság I)
- Average home league attendance: 1,716
- Biggest win: 4–0 v Oroszlány (Away, 14 September 2016, Magyar Kupa)
- Biggest defeat: 0–5 v Honvéd (Away, 17 September 2016, Nemzeti Bajnokság I)

The 2016–17 season was Magyar Testgyakorlók Köre Budapest Futball Club's 107th competitive season, 5th consecutive season in the Nemzeti Bajnokság I and 112th season in existence as a football club. In addition to the domestic league, MTK participated in that season's editions of the Magyar Kupa and the UEFA Europa League.

== Squad ==
Squad at end of season

Note: Flags indicate national team as defined under FIFA eligibility rules; some limited exceptions apply. Players may hold more than one non-FIFA nationality.

No.	Pos.	Nation	Player
1	GK	(Montenegro) MNE	Danijel Petković
4	DF	(Hungary) HUN	Ákos Baki
5	DF	(Croatia) CRO	Mato Grgić
6	DF	(Serbia) SRB	Dražen Okuka
7	FW	(Brazil) BRA	Myke Ramos
8	MF	(Hungary) HUN	Bálint Vogyicska
10	FW	(Argentina) ARG	Leandro Martínez
11	FW	(Hungary) HUN	Dániel Gera
14	FW	(Hungary) HUN	Sándor Torghelle
19	MF	(Hungary) HUN	József Kanta
20	FW	(Hungary) HUN	Ádám Hrepka
21	DF	(Serbia) SRB	Dragan Vukmir
23	DF	(Hungary) HUN	Dániel Vadnai

No.	Pos.	Nation	Player
24	DF	(Hungary) HUN	Patrik Poór
26	FW	(Ukraine) UKR	Yuriy Kolomoyets
27	FW	(Hungary) HUN	Szabolcs Varga
28	GK	(Italy) ITA	Federico Groppioni
30	MF	(Hungary) HUN	Bálint Borbély
38	MF	(Hungary) HUN	Ádám Vass
60	MF	(Hungary) HUN	Kevin Korozmán
61	DF	(Hungary) HUN	Máté Katona
62	MF	(Hungary) HUN	Ronald Takács
63	MF	(Hungary) HUN	Péter Forgács
64	MF	(Hungary) HUN	Ádám Szabó
89	MF	(Hungary) HUN	Márk Nikházi

== Transfers ==
=== Transfers in ===
Transfer window	Pos.	No.	Player	From
Summer	DF	–	(Hungary) Gergő Adorján	Youth team
Summer	MF	–	(Hungary) Kristóf Hinora	Youth team
Summer	MF	–	(Hungary) Levente Lustyik	Youth team
Summer	FW	–	(Hungary) Bence Szabó	Szigetszentmiklós
Summer	GK	1	(Montenegro) Danijel Petković	(Montenegro) Lovćen
Summer	DF	6	(Serbia) Dražen Okuka	Diósgyőr
Summer	FW	27	(Hungary) Szabolcs Varga	(Netherlands) Heerenveen
Summer	MF	30	(Hungary) Bálint Borbély	Békéscsaba
Summer	MF	62	(Hungary) Ronald Takács	Youth team
Summer	MF	63	(Hungary) Péter Forgács	Youth team
Winter	MF	12	(Hungary) Miklós Szerencsi	Youth team
Winter	FW	26	(Ukraine) Yuriy Kolomoyets	(Ukraine) Vorskla Poltava
Winter	MF	89	(Hungary) Márk Nikházi	Diósgyőr

=== Transfers out ===
Transfer window	Pos.	No.	Player	To
Summer	DF	–	(Hungary) András Szalai	Paks
Summer	GK	1	(Hungary) Lajos Hegedűs	Puskás Akadémia
Summer	DF	2	(Hungary) Tibor Nagy	Újpest
Summer	MF	8	(Hungary) Ádám Hajdú	Honvéd
Summer	MF	15	(Slovakia) Marek Střeštík	Mezőkövesd
Summer	DF	18	(Hungary) Barnabás Bese	(France) Le Havre
Summer	MF	22	(Hungary) Benjámin Cseke	Újpest
Winter	FW	9	(Montenegro) Darko Nikač	Released
Winter	MF	25	(Hungary) Lóránd Szatmári	Released (Note: Joined Puskás Akadémia.)

=== Loans in ===
Transfer window	Pos.	No.	Player	From	End date
Winter	FW	10	(Argentina) Leandro Martínez	Haladás	End of season

=== Loans out ===
Transfer window	Pos.	No.	Player	To	End date
Summer	DF	–	(Hungary) Dávid Asztalos	Cegléd	End of season
Summer	DF	3	(Hungary) Bence Deutsch	Zalaegerszeg	End of season
Summer	MF	6	(Senegal) Khaly Thiam	(United States) Chicago Fire	Middle of season
Summer	MF	12	(Hungary) Dávid Jakab	Zalaegerszeg	End of season
Summer	DF	12	(Hungary) Ferenc Tóth	Vác	End of season
Summer	GK	30	(Hungary) Tamás Fadgyas	Zalaegerszeg	End of season
Summer	DF	34	(Hungary) Attila Talabér	Kisvárda	End of season
Summer	FW	39	(Hungary) Péter Horváth	Sopron	End of season
Summer	MF	57	(Hungary) András Pintér	Kaposvár	End of season
Summer	MF	57	(Hungary) Ádám Schrammel	SZEOL	End of season
Summer	FW	59	(Hungary) Tamás Hujber	Kaposvár	End of season
Winter	GK	1	(Hungary) Patrik Demjén	Dorog	End of season
Winter	MF	6	(Senegal) Khaly Thiam	(Turkey) Gaziantepspor	End of season
Winter	MF	58	(Hungary) István Szatmári	Zalaegerszeg	End of season

== Competitions ==
=== Overview ===
Competition	First match	Last match	Starting round	Final position	Record							
Competition	First match	Last match	Starting round	Final position	Pld	W	D	L	GF	GA	GD	Win %
Nemzeti Bajnokság I	17 July 2016	27 May 2017	Matchday 1	11th	33	8	13	12	26	36	−10	24.24
Magyar Kupa	14 September 2016	30 November 2016	Round of 128	Round of 32	3	2	0	1	7	2	+5	66.67
UEFA Europa League	30 June 2016	21 July 2016	First qualifying round	Second qualifying round	4	1	1	2	4	5	−1	25.00
Total					40	11	14	15	37	43	−6	27.50

Source: Competitions

=== Nemzeti Bajnokság I ===
==== League table ====
Pos	Team	Pld	W	D	L	GF	GA	GD	Pts	Qualification or relegation
8	Debrecen	33	11	8	14	42	46	−4	41	
9	Mezőkövesd	33	10	10	13	39	54	−15	40	
10	Diósgyőr	33	10	7	16	39	58	−19	37	
11	MTK (R)	33	8	13	12	26	36	−10	37	Relegation to the Nemzeti Bajnokság II
12	Gyirmót (R)	33	5	9	19	21	51	−30	24	Relegation to the Nemzeti Bajnokság II

Source: Hungarian Football Federation (in Hungarian), Soccerway
Rules for classification: 1) Points; 2) Matches won; 3) Goal difference; 4) Goals scored; 5) Head-to-head points; 6) Head-to-head goal difference; 7) Head-to-head away goals scored; 8) Fairplay; 9) Draw.
(R) Relegated

==== Results summary ====
Overall								Home						Away					
Pld	W	D	L	GF	GA	GD	Pts	W	D	L	GF	GA	GD	W	D	L	GF	GA	GD
33	8	13	12	26	36	−10	37	6	5	6	14	15	−1	2	8	6	12	21	−9

Source: Hungarian Football Federation

==== Results by round ====
Round	1	2	3	4	5	6	7	8	9	10	11	12	13	14	15	16	17	18	19	20	21	22	23	24	25	26	27	28	29	30	31	32	33
Ground	H	A	H	H	A	H	A	H	A	H	A	A	H	A	A	H	A	H	A	H	A	H	H	A	H	H	A	H	A	H	A	H	A
Result	L	D	L	L	D	W	D	W	L	W	D	L	W	L	D	D	L	D	D	L	W	L	W	L	W	D	D	D	W	L	L	D	D
Position	10	9	12	12	11	10	9	9	9	7	8	9	8	9	9	9	10	10	11	11	9	10	9	10	10	10	10	10	9	11	11	11	11
Points	0	1	1	1	2	5	6	9	9	12	13	13	16	16	17	18	18	19	20	20	23	23	26	26	29	30	31	32	35	35	35	36	37

Source: Matches
A = Away; H = Home; W = Win; D = Draw; L = Loss

==== Matches ====
17 July 2016 1	MTK	0–1	Vasas	Dunaújváros
18:00 CEST (UTC+2)	Poór (yellow card) 55'	Report	Berecz (yellow card) 5'; Ádám 56'; Remili (yellow card) 73'	Stadium: Dunaújvárosi Stadion; Attendance: 638; Referee: Ádám Farkas; Assistant referees: Gábor Erős, Oszkár Lémon; Fourth official: Dániel Szalai; Goal-line assistants: Ferenc Karakó, Szabolcs Szilasi

24 July 2016 2	Gyirmót	0–0	MTK	Győr
18:00 CEST (UTC+2)	Lengyel (yellow card) 15'; Völgyi (yellow card) 83'	Report	Baki (yellow card) 59'	Stadium: Ménfői úti Stadion; Attendance: 2,200; Referee: József Erdős; Assistant referees: Péter Berettyán, Balázs Huszár; Fourth official: Balázs Farkas; Goal-line assistants: Péter Solymosi, Tamás Nazsa

31 July 2016 3	MTK	0–1	Mezőkövesd	Dunaújváros
18:00 CEST (UTC+2)	Baki (yellow card) 82'	Report	Kink 59'; Vági (yellow card) 80'; Nicorec (yellow card) 83'	Stadium: Dunaújvárosi Stadion; Attendance: 408; Referee: Péter Solymosi; Assistant referees: Róbert Horváth, Gábor Varga Jr. Fourth official: Gergely Becséri; Goal-line assistants: Ferenc Karakó, József Erdős

7 August 2016 4	MTK	0–2	Haladás	Dunaújváros
18:00 CEST (UTC+2)	Gera (yellow card) 45'; Vass (yellow card) 90+3'	Report	J. Hegedűs 39'; Williams 59'	Stadium: Dunaújvárosi Stadion; Attendance: 316; Referee: Zoltán Iványi; Assistant referees: István Albert, Balázs Farkas; Fourth official: Balázs Buzás; Goal-line assistants: Tamás Nazsa, Katalin Kulcsár

13 August 2016 5	Debrecen	1–1	MTK	Debrecen
18:00 CEST (UTC+2)	Jovanović (yellow card) 45'; Ferenczi (yellow card) 67'; Castillion 75'	Report	Vogyicska 35'; Korozmán (yellow card) 50'; Borbély (yellow card) 74'; Kanta (yellow card) 75'; Vukmir (yellow card) 76'; Vadnai (yellow card) 82'; Torghelle (yellow card) 90+2'	Stadium: Nagyerdei Stadion; Attendance: 4,091; Referee: Ferenc Karakó; Assistant referees: Gábor Erős, Dániel Szalai; Fourth official: Balázs Szalai; Goal-line assistants: János Takács, Katalin Kulcsár

16 August 2016 6	MTK	1–0	Videoton	Dunaújváros
18:00 CEST (UTC+2)	Borbély (yellow card) 31'; Vadnai (yellow card) 38'; Torghelle (yellow card) 59', (goal) 64'; Poór (yellow card) 90'	Report	Pátkai (yellow card) 18'; Suljić (yellow card) 83'	Stadium: Dunaújvárosi Stadion; Attendance: 704; Referee: Csaba Pintér; Assistant referees: Balázs Huszár, Balázs Szalai; Fourth official: Arnold Kepe; Goal-line assistants: Attila Molnár, Katalin Kulcsár

21 August 2016 7	Újpest	0–0	MTK	Budapest (Note: The match was played at the Illovszky Rudolf Stadion in Budapest, instead of Újpest regular stadium, the Szusza Ferenc Stadion in Budapest, due to the renovation work.)
18:00 CEST (UTC+2)	Kálnoki-Kis (yellow card) 62'; Diarra (yellow card) 81'; T. Nagy (yellow card) 82'	Report	Borbély (yellow card) 54'; Vukmir (yellow card) 77'	Stadium: Illovszky Rudolf Stadion; Attendance: 3,300; Referee: Péter Solymosi; Assistant referees: Dr. Zsolt Varga, Tamás Márkus; Fourth official: Péter Kóbor; Goal-line assistants: Tamás Nazsa, Katalin Kulcsár

10 September 2016 8	MTK	2–1	Ferencváros	Dunaújváros
20:30 CEST (UTC+2)	Gera 34'; Vukmir (red card) 77'; Torghelle (yellow card) 84', (goal) 90+2'; Petković (yellow card) 89'	Report	Böde (yellow card) 69'; Ryu 70'; Ramírez (yellow card) 73'; Gyömbér (yellow card) 80'	Stadium: Dunaújvárosi Stadion; Attendance: 1,117; Referee: Ferenc Karakó; Assistant referees: Gábor Erős, Dániel Szalai; Fourth official: Gábor Kormányos II; Goal-line assistants: Ádám Németh, Gábor Oláh

17 September 2016 9	Honvéd	5–0	MTK	Budapest
18:30 CEST (UTC+2)	Prosser 16'; Lanzafame 20'; Koszta 44'; D. Bobál 65'; G. Nagy 72'	Report	Baki (yellow card) 19'; Vogyicska (yellow card) 63'; Kanta (yellow card) 90'	Stadium: Bozsik József Stadion; Attendance: 1,465; Referee: József Erdős; Assistant referees: Georgiou Theodoros, Gábor Kormányos II; Fourth official: Gergely Becséri; Goal-line assistants: Csaba Pintér, Ádám Farkas

21 September 2016 10	MTK	1–0	Diósgyőr	Dunaújváros
19:00 CEST (UTC+2)	Poór 33'; Vass (yellow card) 51'	Report	Lipták (yellow card) 30'	Stadium: Dunaújvárosi Stadion; Attendance: 402; Referee: Csaba Pintér; Assistant referees: Attila Kelemen, Balázs Szert; Fourth official: Balázs Huszár; Goal-line assistants: Tamás Bognár, Eszter Urbán

24 September 2016 11	Paks	0–0	MTK	Paks
18:00 CEST (UTC+2)	Papp (yellow card) 41'	Report	Vadnai (yellow card) 41'; Torghelle (yellow card) 44'; Vogyicska (yellow card) 62'; Vukmir (yellow card) 81'	Stadium: Fehérvári úti Stadion; Attendance: 789; Referee: István Vad; Assistant referees: Oszkár Lémon, Balázs Huszár; Fourth official: Péter Kóbor; Goal-line assistants: Tamás Bognár, Katalin Kulcsár

15 October 2016 12	Vasas	3–2	MTK	Budapest
18:00 CEST (UTC+2)	Ádám 18', (yellow card) 33'; Sağlık 23', 31'; Berecz (red card) 89'; Kulcsár (yellow card) 90+1'	Report	Vadnai 4'; Torghelle 21'; Vogyicska (yellow card) 38'; Vass (yellow card) 42'; Vukmir (yellow card) 44'	Stadium: Illovszky Rudolf Stadion; Attendance: 3,754; Referee: István Vad; Assistant referees: Gábor Erős, Georgiou Theodoros; Fourth official: Balázs Huszár; Goal-line assistants: Csaba Pintér, Gyöngyi Gaál

22 October 2016 13	MTK	1–0	Gyirmót	Budapest
18:00 CEST (UTC+2)	Okuka (yellow card) 22'; Torghelle 74'	Report		Stadium: Hidegkuti Nándor Stadion; Attendance: 1,183; Referee: Péter Solymosi; Assistant referees: Balázs Farkas, Dr. Zsolt Varga; Fourth official: Tamás Márkus; Goal-line assistants: Gábor Oláh, Péter Zierkelbach

29 October 2016 14	Mezőkövesd	1–0	MTK	Mezőkövesd
18:00 CEST (UTC+2)	Kink (yellow card) 39'; Hudák (yellow card) 52'; Gohér 74'	Report	Okuka (yellow card) 55'	Stadium: Városi Stadion; Attendance: 1,815; Referee: Balázs Berke; Assistant referees: Oszkár Lémon, Attila Kelemen; Fourth official: Gábor Varga Jr. Goal-line assistants: Szabolcs Szilasi, Eszter Urbán

5 November 2016 15	Haladás	1–1	MTK	Sopron (Note: The match was played at the Káposztás utcai Stadion in Sopron, instead of Haladás regular stadium, the Rohonci út in Szombathely, which was demolished to make way to the newly built Haladás Sportkomplexum.)
15:30 CET (UTC+1)	Gaál 11'; Polgár (yellow card) 26'; Overgoor (yellow card) 61'	Report	Torghelle 14', (yellow card) 39'; Petković (yellow card) 27'; Vukmir (yellow card) 57'; Vogyicska (yellow card) 79'; Szatmári (yellow card) 84'	Stadium: Káposztás utcai Stadion; Attendance: 1,265; Referee: Ferenc Karakó; Assistant referees: Gábor Erős, Zoltán Horváth; Fourth official: Oszkár Lémon; Goal-line assistants: Zsolt Szabó, Attila Molnár

19 November 2016 16	MTK	1–1	Debrecen	Budapest
15:30 CET (UTC+1)	Borbély (yellow card) 31'; Kanta 58'; Ramos (yellow card) 71'	Report	Tőzsér (yellow card) 23'; Bobko (yellow card) 51'; Danilović (yellow card) 57'; Brković (yellow card) 64'; Holman 90+4'	Stadium: Hidegkuti Nándor Stadion; Attendance: 1,657; Referee: Sándor Andó-Szabó; Assistant referees: Georgiou Theodoros, Balázs Szalai; Fourth official: Tamás Márkus; Goal-line assistants: Zoltán Iványi, Csaba Pintér

26 November 2016 17	Videoton	2–0	MTK	Felcsút (Note: The match was played at the Pancho Aréna in Felcsút, instead of Videoton regular stadium, the Sóstói Stadion in Székesfehérvár, built in 1967 which was demolished to make way to the newly built Sóstói Stadion.)
18:00 CET (UTC+1)	Hadžić (yellow card) 6'; Lazović (yellow card) 29', (goal) 70', 90'; Vinícius (yellow card) 45'; Juhász (yellow card) 67'; Kovács (yellow card) 79'	Report	Poór (yellow card) 16'; Vogyicska (yellow card) 31'; Ramos (yellow card) 43'	Stadium: Pancho Aréna; Attendance: 1,498; Referee: Ádám Farkas; Assistant referees: Vencel Tóth II, Balázs Szert; Fourth official: Tamás Márkus; Goal-line assistants: János Takács, Róbert Nagy

3 December 2016 18	MTK	1–1	Újpest	Budapest
15:30 CET (UTC+1)	Poór 48'; Vukmir (yellow card) 78'	Report	Bardhi 16'; Heris (yellow card) 66'; Diarra (yellow card) 73'	Stadium: Hidegkuti Nándor Stadion; Attendance: 2,584; Referee: Tamás Bognár; Assistant referees: István Albert, Balázs Buzás; Fourth official: Georgiou Theodoros; Goal-line assistants: Zoltán Iványi, Attila Molnár

10 December 2016 19	Ferencváros	1–1	MTK	Budapest
18:00 CET (UTC+1)	Baki 36' (o.g.); Čukić (red card) 56'; Gera (yellow card) 72'	Report	Kanta (yellow card) 26'; Baki (yellow card) 76'; Torghelle 82', (yellow card) 89'	Stadium: Groupama Arena; Attendance: 4,754; Referee: Sándor Andó-Szabó; Assistant referees: Gábor Erős, Péter Berettyán; Fourth official: István Albert; Goal-line assistants: József Erdős, Zsolt Szabó

18 February 2017 20	MTK	1–2	Honvéd	Budapest
15:30 CET (UTC+1)	Poór (yellow card) 37'; Torghelle 59', (red card) 66'; Ramos (yellow card) 86'	Report	Koszta (yellow card) 45'; Lanzafame 49'; Eppel 77'	Stadium: Hidegkuti Nándor Stadion; Attendance: 2,706; Referee: Csaba Pintér; Assistant referees: Vencel Tóth II, Balázs Szalai; Fourth official: Krisztián Király; Goal-line assistants: Gergely Szőts, Gyöngyi Gaál

25 February 2017 21	Diósgyőr	2–3	MTK	Mezőkövesd (Note: The match was played at the Városi Stadion in Mezőkövesd, instead of Diósgyőr regular stadium, the Diósgyőri Stadion in Miskolc, opened in 1939 which was demolished to make way to the newly built Diósgyőri Stadion.)
15:30 CET (UTC+1)	Ramos 17' (o.g.); Fülöp 42'; Daushvili (yellow card) 52'; Lipták (yellow card) 61'	Report	Gera 6'; Kanta (yellow card) 46', (goal) 73'; Kolomoyets 53'; Vadnai (yellow card) 68'; Baki (yellow card) 90+2'	Stadium: Városi Stadion; Attendance: 1,646; Referee: József Erdős; Assistant referees: László Viszokai, Gergely Becséri; Fourth official: Dániel Szalai; Goal-line assistants: Péter Solymosi, Tamás Nazsa

4 March 2017 22	MTK	1–2	Paks	Budapest
15:30 CET (UTC+1)	Vass (yellow card) 14'; Kanta 90+5'	Report	Vernes 15'; Szabó 22'; Szakály (yellow card) 67'	Stadium: Hidegkuti Nándor Stadion; Attendance: 1,818; Referee: Péter Solymosi; Assistant referees: Péter Berettyán, Tamás Márkus; Fourth official: Georgiou Theodoros; Goal-line assistants: Zsolt Szabó, Katalin Kulcsár

11 March 2017 23	MTK	1–0	Vasas	Budapest
15:30 CET (UTC+1)	Ramos (yellow card) 14', (goal) 42'; Kolomoyets (yellow card) 53'; Kanta (yellow card) 69'	Report	Korcsmár (yellow card) 42'	Stadium: Hidegkuti Nándor Stadion; Attendance: 2,971; Referee: Tamás Bognár; Assistant referees: István Albert, Zoltán Horváth; Fourth official: Balázs Buzás; Goal-line assistants: Ádám Németh, Gyöngyi Gaál

1 April 2017 24	Gyirmót	1–0	MTK	Győr
18:00 CEST (UTC+2)	Á. Simon (yellow card) 45'; An. Simon 57'	Report	Grgić (yellow card) 8'; Baki (yellow card) 55'; Vogyicska (yellow card) 60'	Stadium: Ménfői úti Stadion; Attendance: 1,300; Referee: István Vad; Assistant referees: Vencel Tóth II, Gergely Becséri; Fourth official: Gábor Takács; Goal-line assistants: Szabolcs Szilasi, Gyöngyi Gaál

8 April 2017 25	MTK	2–0	Mezőkövesd	Budapest
18:00 CEST (UTC+2)	Vadnai (yellow card) 5'; Kanta (yellow card) 31'; Torghelle 37', (yellow card) 60'; Baki 43', (yellow card) 50'	Report	Tóth (yellow card) 62'	Stadium: Hidegkuti Nándor Stadion; Attendance: 1,264; Referee: Ádám Farkas; Assistant referees: Balázs Szert, Krisztián Király; Fourth official: Dániel Szalai; Goal-line assistants: Csaba Pintér, János Takács

12 April 2017 26	MTK	0–0	Haladás	Budapest
18:00 CEST (UTC+2)	Schäfer (yellow card) 90+4'	Report	Jancsó (yellow card) 33'	Stadium: Hidegkuti Nándor Stadion; Attendance: 1,364; Referee: Péter Solymosi; Assistant referees: István Albert, Balázs Szalai; Fourth official: Balázs Buzás; Goal-line assistants: Zsolt Szabó, Gyöngyi Gaál

15 April 2017 27	Debrecen	0–0	MTK	Debrecen
18:30 CEST (UTC+2)	Osváth (yellow card) 61'	Report	Baki (yellow card) 59'; Okuka (yellow card) 90+1'	Stadium: Nagyerdei Stadion; Attendance: 2,363; Referee: József Erdős; Assistant referees: Georgiou Theodoros, Tamás Márkus; Fourth official: Dániel Szalai; Goal-line assistants: Ádám Radványi, Eszter Urbán

22 April 2017 28	MTK	1–1	Videoton	Budapest
18:00 CEST (UTC+2)	Kolomoyets 9', (yellow card) 27'; Borbély (yellow card) 11'; Torghelle (yellow card) 46'; Kanta (yellow card) 47'; Grgić (yellow card) 78'; Petković (yellow card) 82'	Report	Marić 6'; Fiola (yellow card) 59'	Stadium: Hidegkuti Nándor Stadion; Attendance: 1,908; Referee: Csaba Pintér; Assistant referees: Georgiou Theodoros, Balázs Szert; Fourth official: Zoltán Horváth; Goal-line assistants: Ádám Németh, Ádám Radványi

29 April 2017 28	Újpest	1–2	MTK	Budapest
18:00 CEST (UTC+2)	Sanković (yellow card) 2'; Cseke (yellow card) 44'; Lázok (yellow card) 45'; Bardhi 83'	Report	Baki (yellow card) 30'; Katona (yellow card) 38'; Torghelle 45+1'; Grgić (yellow card) 64'; Hrepka 90', (yellow card) 90+5'	Stadium: Szusza Ferenc Stadion; Attendance: 1,962; Referee: István Vad; Assistant referees: Dr. Zsolt Varga, Gergely Becséri; Fourth official: Róbert Horváth; Goal-line assistants: Gábor Oláh, Tibor Gyarmati II

6 May 2017 30	MTK	1–3	Ferencváros	Budapest
20:30 CEST (UTC+2)	Grgić (yellow card) 62'; Ramos 80'; Baki (yellow card) 90+3'	Report	R. Varga 10'; Lovrencsics 31'; Moutari 45'; Sternberg (yellow card) 71'; Djuricin (yellow card) 90'	Stadium: Hidegkuti Nándor Stadion; Attendance: 4,368; Referee: Tamás Bognár; Assistant referees: Péter Berettyán, Balázs Buzás; Fourth official: János Medovarszki; Goal-line assistants: Ádám Németh, Attila Molnár

13 May 2017 31	Honvéd	2–1	MTK	Budapest
18:00 CEST (UTC+2)	Holender 64'; Baráth (yellow card) 74'; Korozmán 83' (o.g.); Villám (yellow card) 90+3'	Report	Borbély (yellow card) 54'; Ramos 65'	Stadium: Bozsik József Stadion; Attendance: 3,370; Referee: Péter Solymosi; Assistant referees: Krisztián Király, Gergely Becséri; Fourth official: Gábor Takács; Goal-line assistants: Ádám Németh, Ádám Radványi

20 May 2017 32	MTK	0–0	Diósgyőr	Budapest
18:00 CEST (UTC+2)	Baki (yellow card) 30'; Okuka (yellow card) 33'; Vass (yellow card) 82'	Report	Mevoungou (yellow card) 53'; Karan (yellow card) 59'; Busai (yellow card) 67'	Stadium: Hidegkuti Nándor Stadion; Attendance: 3,771; Referee: Zsolt Szabó; Assistant referees: Péter Berettyán, Péter Kóbor; Fourth official: Oszkár Lémon; Goal-line assistants: Ádám Németh, Attila Molnár

27 May 2017 33	Paks	1–1	MTK	Paks
19:00 CEST (UTC+2)	Gévay (yellow card) 33'; Papp (yellow card) 61'; Haraszti (yellow card) 63'; Bartha 90'	Report	Borbély (yellow card) 32'; Ramos (yellow card) 50'; Hrepka 90+2'	Stadium: Fehérvári úti Stadion; Attendance: 1,300; Referee: Zoltán Iványi; Assistant referees: Róbert Horváth, Balázs Szalai; Fourth official: Dr. Zsolt Varga; Goal-line assistants: Csaba Pintér, Ádám Radványi

=== Magyar Kupa ===
14 September 2016 Round of 128	Oroszlány	0–4	MTK	Oroszlány
15:30 CEST (UTC+2)	Á. Tóth (yellow card) 40'	Report	Varga 4'; Nikač 28'; Takács 76'; Ramos (yellow card) 81', (goal) 88'	Stadium: Chudik Lajos Városi Sporttelep; Attendance: 500; Referee: Attila Molnár; Assistant referees: Dávid Bertalan, Imre Németh

26 October 2016 Round of 64	Balassagyarmat	1–3	MTK	Balassagyarmat
13:30 CEST (UTC+2)	Szalánszki 90'	Report	Nikač 19', 49'; S. Varga 23'	Stadium: Kövi Pál Sportközpont; Attendance: 1,100; Referee: János Takács; Assistant referees: Róbert Horváth, Norbert Szilágyi

30 November 2016 Round of 32	Dorog	1–0	MTK	Dorog
12:00 CET (UTC+1)	Kovács (yellow card) 44'; Perović (yellow card) 47'; Füredi (yellow card) 57'; Bor 75'; Zima (yellow card) 89'	Report	Katona (yellow card) 37'	Stadium: Buzánszky Jenő Stadion; Attendance: 500; Referee: Gergő Bogár; Assistant referees: Zoltán Pápai, Gábor Máyer; Fourth official: Miklós Tuczai

=== UEFA Europa League ===
==== Qualifying rounds ====
===== First qualifying round =====
30 June 2016 First leg	Aktobe (Kazakhstan)	1–1	(Hungary) MTK	Aktobe, Kazakhstan
19:00 AQTT (UTC+5)	Zhalmukan 44' (pen.); Sitdikov (yellow card) 72'; Sorokin (yellow card) 86'	Report	Torghelle 30'; Nikač (yellow card) 83'; Borbély (yellow card) 90'	Stadium: Central Stadium; Attendance: 8,600; Referee: Sascha Amhof (Switzerland); Assistant referees: Marco Zürcher (Switzerland), Bekim Zogaj (Switzerland); Fourth official: Lukas Fähndrich (Switzerland)

7 July 2016 Second leg	MTK (Hungary)	2–0 (3–1 agg.)	(Kazakhstan) Aktobe	Győr, Hungary
18:00 CEST (UTC+2)	Nikač 7'; Bese 84'	Report		Stadium: Ménfői úti Stadion; Attendance: 601; Referee: Nikolay Yordanov (Bulgaria); Assistant referees: Ivan Valchev (Bulgaria), Georgi Slavov (Bulgaria); Fourth official: Nikola Popov (Bulgaria)
Note: MTK won 3–1 on aggregate.

===== Second qualifying round =====
14 July 2016 First leg	MTK (Hungary)	1–2	(Azerbaijan) Gabala	Győr, Hungary
20:30 CEST (UTC+2)	Kanta (penalty missed) 15'; Gera (yellow card) 26'; Bese (yellow card) 40'; Torghelle 70'	Report	Kvekveskiri 25'; Stanković (yellow card) 49'; Ozobić 63'	Stadium: Ménfői úti Stadion; Attendance: 501; Referee: Bojan Pandžić (Sweden); Assistant referees: Stefan Hallberg (Sweden), Magnus Sjöblom (Sweden); Fourth official: Mohammed Al-Hakim (Sweden)

21 July 2016 Second leg	Gabala (Azerbaijan)	2–0 (4–1 agg.)	(Hungary) MTK	Baku, Azerbaijan (Note: The match was played at the Bakcell Arena in Baku, instead of Gabala regular stadium, the City Stadium in Qabala.)
21:00 AZT (UTC+4)	Zenjov 7'; Stanković (yellow card) 16'; Weeks 37'	Report	Baki (yellow card) 35'; Grgić (yellow card) 85'	Stadium: Bakcell Arena; Attendance: 5,550; Referee: Mete Kalkavan (Turkey); Assistant referees: Ceyhun Sesigüzel (Turkey), Esat Sancaktar (Turkey); Fourth official: Serkan Cinar (Turkey)
Note: Gabala won 4–1 on aggregate.

== Statistics ==
=== Overall ===
Appearances (Apps) numbers are for appearances in competitive games only, including sub appearances.
Source: Competitions

No.	Player	Pos.	Nemzeti Bajnokság I				Magyar Kupa				UEFA Europa League				Total			
No.	Player	Pos.	Apps	Goal	Booked	Sent off (straight red)	Apps	Goal	Booked	Sent off (straight red)	Apps	Goal	Booked	Sent off (straight red)	Apps	Goal	Booked	Sent off (straight red)
1	(Hungary) Patrik Demjén	GK																
1	(Hungary) Lajos Hegedűs	GK	7								4				11			
1	(Montenegro) Danijel Petković	GK	26		3										26		3	
3	(Hungary) Bence Deutsch	DF									1				1			
3	(Bosnia and Herzegovina) Kenan Hreljić	DF																
4	(Hungary) Ákos Baki	DF	27	1	11		2				4		1		33	1	12	
4	(Hungary) Imre Széles	DF					1								1			
5	(Croatia) Mato Grgić	DF	14		4		2				4		1		20		5	
6	(Serbia) Dražen Okuka	DF	18		4		3								21		4	
7	(Brazil) Myke Ramos	FW	21	3	5		2	1	1						23	4	6	
8	(Hungary) Bálint Vogyicska	MF	24	1	6		1								25	1	6	
9	(Montenegro) Darko Nikač	FW	6				3	3			4	1	1		13	4	1	
10	(Argentina) Leandro Martínez	FW	6												6			
11	(Hungary) Dániel Gera	FW	17	2	1		1				3		1		21	2	2	
12	(Hungary) Dávid Jakab	MF	4								2				6			
12	(Hungary) Miklós Szerencsi	MF					2								2			
14	(Hungary) Sándor Torghelle	FW	26	9	8	1	1				4	2			31	11	8	1
18	(Hungary) Barnabás Bese	DF	1								3	1	1		4	1	1	
19	(Hungary) József Kanta	MF	32	3	7		1				4				37	3	7	
20	(Hungary) Ádám Hrepka	FW	13	2	1						2				15	2	1	
21	(Serbia) Dragan Vukmir	DF	14		6	1	1								15		6	1
23	(Hungary) Dániel Vadnai	DF	29	1	5		2				2				33	1	5	
24	(Hungary) Patrik Poór	DF	33	2	4		1				4				38	2	4	
25	(Hungary) Lóránd Szatmári	MF	4				2				4				10			
26	(Ukraine) Yuriy Kolomoyets	FW	12	2	2										12	2	2	
27	(Hungary) Szabolcs Varga	FW	8				3	2			2				13	2		
28	(Italy) Federico Groppioni	GK					3								3			
30	(Hungary) Bálint Borbély	MF	19		7						4		1		23		8	
38	(Hungary) Ádám Vass	MF	31		5		2				4				37		5	
58	(Hungary) István Szatmári	MF	10		1		3								13		1	
60	(Hungary) Kevin Korozmán	MF	19		1		1								20		1	
61	(Hungary) Máté Katona	DF	22		1		3		1						25		2	
62	(Hungary) Ronald Takács	MF	4				2	1							6	1		
63	(Hungary) Péter Forgács	MF																
64	(Hungary) Ádám Szabó	MF	1												1			
65	(Hungary) András Schäfer	MF	2		1										2		1	
89	(Hungary) Márk Nikházi	MF	6												6			
Own goals																		
Totals				26	83	2		7	2			4	6			37	91	2

=== Clean sheets ===
			Clean sheets			
No.	Player	Games Played	Nemzeti Bajnokság I	Magyar Kupa	UEFA Europa League	Total
1	(Montenegro) Danijel Petković	26	8			8
1	(Hungary) Lajos Hegedűs	11	3		1	4
28	(Italy) Federico Groppioni	3		1		1
1	(Hungary) Patrik Demjén					
Totals			11	1	1	13
