= 2015–16 MTK Budapest FC season =

MTK Budapest
2015–16 season
- Manager: Csaba László (until 3 February); Vaszilisz Teodoru (from 3 February)
- Stadium: Stadion Rudolf Illovszky (Primary temporary venue); Dunaújvárosi Stadion (Secondary temporary venue)
- Nemzeti Bajnokság I: 4th
- Magyar Kupa: Round of 16
- UEFA Europa League: First qualifying round
- Top goalscorer: League: Sándor Torghelle (11); All: Sándor Torghelle (11)
- Highest home attendance: 2,114 (vs Ferencváros, 21 November 2015)
- Lowest home attendance: 170 (vs Békéscsaba, 17 November 2015)
Home colours	Away colours	Third colours

The 2015–16 season was Magyar Testgyakorlók Köre Budapest Futball Club's 106th competitive season, 4th consecutive season in the Nemzeti Bajnokság I and 127th year in existence as a football club. In addition to the domestic league, MTK Budapest participated in this season's editions of the Magyar Kupa and UEFA Europa League.

Csaba László began the season as MTK's new manager after taking over from József Garami, who retired after 11 years in charge and became technical director at the club. Since playing in the Bozsik József Stadion previous season the temporary venue changed to Stadion Rudolf Illovszky due to the construction of the new stadium, Hidegkuti Nándor Stadion. On 3 February, László was sacked as a manager, less than a year into his six-year contract. Vaszilisz Teodoru with Greek descent take charge until the end of the season. Due to the worn condition of the pitch, with Vasas also playing on it week by week, last matches of MTK played at the Dunaújvárosi Stadion.

== Kits ==
Home	Away	Third	Goalkeeper 1	Goalkeeper 2
Goalkeeper 3

== First team squad ==
The players listed had league appearances and stayed until the end of the season.

Note: Flags indicate national team as defined under FIFA eligibility rules; some limited exceptions apply. Players may hold more than one non-FIFA nationality.

No.	Pos.	Nation	Player
1	GK	HUN	Lajos Hegedűs
3	DF	HUN	Bence Deutsch
4	DF	HUN	Ákos Baki
5	DF	CRO	Mato Grgić
6	MF	SEN	Khaly Thiam
7	FW	BRA	Myke Ramos
8	MF	HUN	Ádám Hajdú
9	FW	MNE	Darko Nikač
11	FW	HUN	Szabolcs Varga
13	FW	HUN	Ádám Hrepka
14	FW	HUN	Sándor Torghelle

No.	Pos.	Nation	Player
15	MF	CZE	Marek Střeštík
18	DF	HUN	Barnabás Bese
19	MF	HUN	József Kanta (captain)
21	DF	SRB	Dragan Vukmir
23	DF	HUN	Dániel Vadnai
24	DF	HUN	Patrik Poór
38	MF	HUN	Ádám Vass
55	MF	HUN	Bálint Vogyicska
56	FW	HUN	Dániel Gera
58	MF	HUN	István Szatmári
59	FW	HUN	Tamás Hujber

== Transfers ==
=== Transfers in ===
Transfer window	Pos.	No.	Player	From
Summer	DF	5	(Croatia) Mato Grgić	(Croatia) Slaven Belupo
Summer	MF	10	(Hungary) Lóránd Szatmári	Free agent (Note: Previous club: Pécs.)
Summer	MF	15	(Czech Republic) Marek Střeštík	Free agent (Note: Previous club: Győr.)
Summer	GK	42	(Hungary) Patrik Demjén^{II}	Youth team
Summer	MF	55	(Hungary) Bálint Vogyicska	Youth team
Winter	MF	8	(Hungary) Dávid Jakab^{II}	Dunaújváros
Winter	FW	9	(Montenegro) Darko Nikač	(Montenegro) Budućnost

^{II} – Player played in MTK Budapest II during the season.

=== Transfers out ===
Transfer window	Pos.	No.	Player	To
Summer
Summer	FW	–	(Hungary) Bence Mervó	(Switzerland) Sion
Summer	DF	5	(Hungary) Dávid Kelemen	Released (Note: Joined Hapoel Tel Aviv.)
Summer	DF	5	(Greece) Konstantinos Ikonomou	Released
Summer	FW	7	(Hungary) Zsolt Horváth	Released (Note: Joined Debrecen.)
Summer	FW	8	(Hungary) Norbert Csiki	Released
Summer	FW	9	(Spain) Sergio Tamayo	Released (Note: Joined SD Logroñés.)
Summer	DF	12	(Hungary) Dávid Kálnoki-Kis	Released (Note: Joined Újpest.)
Summer	MF	16	(Hungary) Zsolt Pölöskei	Released (Note: Joined Videoton.)
Summer	MF	17	(Hungary) Patrik Vass	Gyirmót
Summer	FW	20	(Hungary) Balázs Batizi-Pócsi	Sopron
Summer	FW	20	(Hungary) Ferenc Rácz	Mezőkövesd
Summer	MF	27	(Hungary) Ramon Halmai	Diósgyőr
Summer	DF	33	(Hungary) Szilveszter Hangya	Vasas

=== Loans in ===
Transfer window	Pos.	No.	Player	From	End date
Summer	FW	11	(Hungary) Szabolcs Varga	(Netherlands) Heerenveen	End of season

=== Loans out ===
Transfer window	Pos.	No.	Player	To	End date
Summer	DF	2	(Hungary) Tibor Nagy	Újpest	End of season
Summer	DF	22	(Hungary) Dávid Asztalos	Paks	End of season
Summer	MF	22	(Hungary) Benjámin Cseke	Újpest	End of season
Summer	FW	39	(Hungary) Péter Horváth	Szolnok	End of season
Winter	MF	10	(Hungary) Lóránd Szatmári	Mezőkövesd	End of season
Winter	DF	12	(Hungary) Ferenc Tóth	Vác	End of season

== Competitions ==
=== Overview ===
Competition	First match	Last match	Starting round	Final position	Record							
Competition	First match	Last match	Starting round	Final position	Pld	W	D	L	GF	GA	GD	Win %
Nemzeti Bajnokság I	18 July 2015	30 April 2016	Matchday 1	4th	33	14	9	10	39	37	+2	42.42
Magyar Kupa	14 October 2015	17 November 2015	Round of 32	Round of 16	3	1	1	1	6	1	+5	33.33
UEFA Europa League	2 July 2015	9 July 2015	First qualifying round	First qualifying round	2	0	1	1	1	3	−2	0.00
Total					38	15	11	12	46	41	+5	39.47

Source: Competitions

=== Nemzeti Bajnokság I ===
==== League table ====
Pos	Team	Pld	W	D	L	GF	GA	GD	Pts	Qualification or relegation
2	Videoton	33	17	4	12	42	29	+13	55	Qualification for the Europa League first qualifying round (Note: Since the winners of the 2015–16 Magyar Kupa, Ferencváros, qualified for European competition based on league position, the spot awarded to the cup winners (Europa League first qualifying round) was passed to the fourth-placed team.)
3	Debrecen	33	14	11	8	48	34	+14	53	Qualification for the Europa League first qualifying round
4	MTK Budapest	33	14	9	10	39	37	+2	51	Qualification for the Europa League first qualifying round
5	Haladás	33	13	11	9	33	37	−4	50	
6	Újpest	33	11	13	9	42	37	+5	46	

Source: Soccerway
Rules for classification: 1) Points; 2) Matches won; 3) Goal difference; 4) Goals scored; 5) Head-to-head points; 6) Head-to-head goal difference; 7) Head-to-head away goals scored; 8) Fairplay; 9) Draw.

==== Results summary ====
Overall								Home						Away					
Pld	W	D	L	GF	GA	GD	Pts	W	D	L	GF	GA	GD	W	D	L	GF	GA	GD
33	14	9	10	39	37	+2	51	12	2	3	23	8	+15	2	7	7	16	29	−13

Source: Hungarian Football Federation

==== Results by round ====
Round	1	2	3	4	5	6	7	8	9	10	11	12	13	14	15	16	17	18	19	20	21	22	23	24	25	26	27	28	29	30	31	32	33
Ground	H	A	A	H	A	H	A	A	A	A	A	A	H	H	A	H	A	H	A	H	A	H	H	H	H	H	H	A	H	A	H	A	H
Result	W	L	D	W	L	W	W	L	D	D	D	W	W	L	D	W	L	W	L	W	D	D	W	W	W	W	D	L	W	D	L	L	L
Position	5	6	6	3	7	4	3	3	3	4	4	4	3	4	4	3	3	3	5	3	4	6	4	2	2	2	2	2	2	2	2	4	4

Source: Matches
A = Away; H = Home; W = Win; D = Draw; L = Loss

==== Matches ====
18 July 2015 1	MTK Budapest	1–0	Puskás Akadémia	Budapest
18:00 CEST (UTC+2)	Torghelle 28', (yellow card) 90+3'; Varga (yellow card) 63'; Střeštík (yellow card) 67'	Report	Fiola (yellow card) 84'	Stadium: Stadion Rudolf Illovszky; Attendance: 800; Referee: Sándor Andó-Szabó

25 July 2015 2	Budapest Honvéd	2–1	MTK Budapest	Budapest
15:30 CEST (UTC+2)	Kamber 43'; Bobál (yellow card) 85'; Vernes 86'; Baráth (yellow card) 90+2'	Report	Střeštík 37'; Thiam (yellow card) 45'; Torghelle (yellow card) 72'	Stadium: Bozsik József Stadion; Attendance: 1,480; Referee: Viktor Kassai

1 August 2015 3	Haladás	2–2	MTK Budapest	Szombathely
18:00 CEST (UTC+2)	Ugrai 14'; Jagodics 35', (yellow card) 87'; Gosztonyi (yellow card) 44'; Halmosi (yellow card) 70'	Report	Torghelle (yellow card) 45'; Hrepka 49'; Thiam 90+3'	Stadium: Rohonci Street Stadium; Attendance: 3,130; Referee: Balázs Berke

8 August 2015 4	MTK Budapest	5–0	Diósgyőr	Budapest
18:00 CEST (UTC+2)	Kanta 11', 90' (pen.); Vadnai 30'; Hrepka 59'; Ramos 73'	Report	Kovács (red card) 56'; Lipták (yellow card) 68'; Antal (red card) 88'	Stadium: Stadion Rudolf Illovszky; Attendance: 831; Referee: József Erdős

15 August 2015 5	Ferencváros	2–0	MTK Budapest	Budapest
20:30 CEST (UTC+2)	Ramírez (yellow card) 44'; Z. Gera 52'; Böde 60'	Report	Vass (yellow card) 21'; D. Gera (yellow card) 39'; Hegedűs (yellow card) 56'	Stadium: Groupama Arena; Attendance: 6,817; Referee: Zoltán Iványi

23 August 2015 6	MTK Budapest	1–0	Videoton	Budapest
18:00 CEST (UTC+2)	Torghelle (yellow card) 46'; Grgić (yellow card) 48'; Vass (yellow card) 58'; D. Gera (yellow card) 62'; Kanta 81' (pen.)	Report	Pátkai (yellow card) 36'; Simon (yellow card) 59'; Juhász (red card) 90+3'	Stadium: Stadion Rudolf Illovszky; Attendance: 1,117; Referee: Viktor Kassai

29 August 2015 7	Vasas	0–1	MTK Budapest	Budapest
18:00 CEST (UTC+2)		Report	Vass (yellow card) 64'; Vadnai (yellow card) 66'; Hegedűs (yellow card) 84'; Szatmári 85'	Stadium: Stadion Rudolf Illovszky; Attendance: 2,000; Referee: Ádám Németh

12 September 2015 8	Debrecen	1–0	MTK Budapest	Debrecen
18:00 CEST (UTC+2)	Sidibe 3', (yellow card) 65'; N. Balogh (red card) 71'	Report	Vukmir (yellow card) 1'; Hrepka (yellow card) 36'; Grgić (yellow card) 55'; Torghelle (yellow card) 84'; Vass (yellow card) 86'; D. Gera (red card) 90'; Bese (yellow card) 90+3'	Stadium: Nagyerdei Stadion; Attendance: 2,159; Referee: Tamás Bognár

19 September 2015 9	Paks	0–0	MTK Budapest	Paks
18:00 CEST (UTC+2)		Report		Stadium: Fehérvári úti Stadion; Attendance: 1,141; Referee: József Erdős

26 September 2015 10	Újpest	2–2	MTK Budapest	Budapest
20:30 CEST (UTC+2)	Diagne 14', (yellow card) 15'; T. Nagy (yellow card) 23'; Bardhi 48'; Sallói (yellow card) 82'; Balajcza (red card) 88'	Report	Torghelle 63'; Kanta 88' (pen.), (yellow card) 90'	Stadium: Ferenc Szusza Stadium; Attendance: 1,444; Referee: Zoltán Iványi

3 October 2015 11	Békéscsaba	1–1	MTK Budapest	Békéscsaba
18:00 CEST (UTC+2)	Laczkó (yellow card) 12'; Punoševac 90+3'	Report	Thiam (yellow card) 30'; Varga (yellow card) 36'; Torghelle 64'	Stadium: Stadion Kórház utcai Attendance: 1,732; Referee: Ferenc Karakó

17 October 2015 12	Puskás Akadémia	2–3	MTK Budapest	Felcsút
18:00 CEST (UTC+2)	Lencse 17' (pen.); Bačelić-Grgić (yellow card) 20'; Herceg (yellow card) 62'; Fodor 77'; Márkvárt (yellow card) 79'	Report	Vadnai (yellow card) 16'; Kanta 32', 86' (pen.), (yellow card) 78'; Torghelle (yellow card) 35'; Bese 53'	Stadium: Pancho Aréna; Attendance: 1,486; Referee: Csaba Pintér

24 October 2015 13	MTK Budapest	2–1	Budapest Honvéd	Budapest
17:30 CEST (UTC+2)	Torghelle 33', 39'; Střeštík (yellow card) 65'; Grgić (yellow card) 72'; Hrepka (yellow card) 89'; D. Gera (yellow card) 90+4'	Report	Kamber 54'; Bobál (yellow card) 62'; Erdélyi (yellow card) 80'	Stadium: Stadion Rudolf Illovszky; Attendance: 1,174; Referee: István Vad

31 October 2015 14	MTK Budapest	0–1	Haladás	Budapest
18:00 CET (UTC+1)	Ramos (yellow card) 88'	Report	Wils (yellow card) 54'; Iszlai (yellow card) 61'; Gaál 75'	Stadium: Stadion Rudolf Illovszky; Attendance: 714; Referee: Zoltán Iványi

21 November 2015 16	MTK Budapest	1–0	Ferencváros	Budapest
18:00 CET (UTC+1)	Torghelle 31'; Vass (yellow card) 32'; Ramos (yellow card) 38'; D. Gera (yellow card) 67'; Thiam (yellow card) 90'	Report	Nalepa (yellow card) 38'; Pintér (yellow card) 51'; Leandro (yellow card) 73'	Stadium: Stadion Rudolf Illovszky; Attendance: 2,114; Referee: József Erdős

28 November 2015 17	Videoton	1–0	MTK Budapest	Székesfehérvár
15:30 CET (UTC+1)	Suljić (yellow card) 32'; Oliveira (yellow card) 77', (goal) 82'; Szolnoki (yellow card) 84'; Juhász (yellow card) 86'; Vinícius (yellow card) 87'; Pölöskei (yellow card) 90+1'; Feczesin (yellow card) 90+3'	Report	D. Gera (red card) 72'; Vadnai (yellow card) 89'	Stadium: Sóstói Stadion; Attendance: 1,314; Referee: Tamás Bognár

2 December 2015 15	Diósgyőr	1–1	MTK Budapest	Miskolc
18:30 CET (UTC+1)	Novothny (yellow card) 65'; Bacsa 69'; Kitl (yellow card) 89'	Report	Poór (yellow card) 22'; Torghelle 38'; Ramos (yellow card) 42'; Střeštík (yellow card) 73'	Stadium: Diósgyőri Stadion; Attendance: 1,911; Referee: István Vad
Note: The matches of the 15th round were originally scheduled for 7 November 2015, but was postponed due to HFF decision.

5 December 2015 18	MTK Budapest	2–1	Vasas	Budapest
15:30 CET (UTC+1)	Torghelle 6', 53'; Thiam (yellow card) 76'; Vadnai (yellow card) 90+1'	Report	Pavlov 22'; Adamović (yellow card) 74'; Romić (yellow card) 75'; Kenesei (yellow card) 89'	Stadium: Stadion Rudolf Illovszky; Attendance: 712; Referee: Viktor Kassai

12 December 2015 19	Debrecen	3–1	MTK Budapest	Debrecen
15:30 CET (UTC+1)	Horváth 13', 55', 72'; Brković (yellow card) 81'	Report	Ramos 90+1'	Stadium: Nagyerdei Stadion; Attendance: 1,285; Referee: Ádám Farkas

20 February 2016 21	Újpest	1–1	MTK Budapest	Budapest
17:00 CET (UTC+1)	Andrić 8'; T. Nagy (yellow card) 80'	Report	Torghelle 45', (yellow card) 87'; Střeštík (yellow card) 59'; Kanta (yellow card) 70'; Vass (yellow card) 90+1'	Stadium: Ferenc Szusza Stadium; Attendance: 2,746; Referee: István Vad

27 February 2016 22	MTK Budapest	0–0	Békéscsaba	Budapest
15:30 CET (UTC+1)	Torghelle (yellow card) 55'; Vass (yellow card) 74'; D. Gera (yellow card) 85'; Grgić (red card) 90'	Report	Calvente (yellow card) 35'; Takács (yellow card) 37'; Bényei (yellow card) 73'; Guarú (yellow card) 78'	Stadium: Stadion Rudolf Illovszky; Attendance: 506; Referee: Csaba Pintér

5 March 2016 23	MTK Budapest	2–1	Újpest	Budapest
15:30 CET (UTC+1)	Vogyicska (yellow card) 32'; Baki (yellow card) 52'; Střeštík 58'; Hrepka 83'; Kanta (yellow card) 88'	Report	Angelov (yellow card) 35'; Mohl (yellow card) 72'; Bardhi 77'	Stadium: Stadion Rudolf Illovszky; Attendance: 1,200; Referee: Viktor Kassai

9 March 2016 24	MTK Budapest	1–0	Budapest Honvéd	Dunaújváros
18:00 CET (UTC+1)	Hrepka 29'	Report	Youla (yellow card) 70'; Lovrić (yellow card) 71'; Prosser (yellow card) 84'	Stadium: Dunaújvárosi Stadion; Attendance: 520; Referee: István Vad

12 March 2016 25	MTK Budapest	3–1	Haladás	Dunaújváros
15:30 CET (UTC+1)	Thiam 16'; Střeštík 59', 78' (pen.); Vass (yellow card) 83'	Report	Ugrai 12'; Wils (yellow card) 24'; Iszlai (yellow card) 30'; Jagodics (yellow card) 77'; Nagy (yellow card) 83'	Stadium: Dunaújvárosi Stadion; Attendance: 348; Referee: Sándor Andó-Szabó

20 March 2016 26	MTK Budapest	1–0	Debrecen	Budapest
15:15 CET (UTC+1)	Nikač 63'; Thiam (yellow card) 72'	Report	P. Szakály (yellow card) 37'; Tisza (yellow card) 73'; Korhut (yellow card) 74'	Stadium: Stadion Rudolf Illovszky; Attendance: 634; Referee: Tamás Bognár

2 April 2016 28	Paks	4–1	MTK Budapest	Paks
18:30 CEST (UTC+2)	Bertus 16'; D. Szakály 24'; Střeštík 55' (o.g.); Hahn 75', (yellow card) 81'	Report	Vogyicska (yellow card) 29'; Střeštík 50'; Poór (yellow card) 74'; Hrepka (yellow card) 90+2'; Vass (yellow card) 90+2'	Stadium: Fehérvári úti Stadion; Attendance: 1,069; Referee: Zoltán Iványi

6 April 2016 29	MTK Budapest	3–0	Békéscsaba	Dunaújváros
19:00 CEST (UTC+2)	Baki (yellow card) 15'; Vass (yellow card) 57'; Nikač 59'; D. Gera 66'; Hajdú 90+3'	Report	Laczkó (yellow card) 57'; Takács (yellow card) 77'; Piermayr (yellow card) 83'	Stadium: Dunaújvárosi Stadion; Attendance: 519; Referee: István Vad

9 April 2016 27	MTK Budapest	0–0	Diósgyőr	Dunaújváros
18:00 CEST (UTC+2)		Report		Stadium: Dunaújvárosi Stadion; Attendance: 506; Referee: Balázs Berke
Note: The matches of the 27th round were originally scheduled for 30 March 2016, but were postponed to ease the pressure on the tight schedule.

12 April 2016 20	MTK Budapest	1–0	Paks	Dunaújváros
18:00 CEST (UTC+2)	Thiam (yellow card) 23'; Vass (yellow card) 80'; Baki 90+3'	Report	Szabó (yellow card) 36'	Stadium: Dunaújvárosi Stadion; Attendance: 380; Referee: Sándor Andó-Szabó
Note: The match was originally scheduled for 13 February 2016, but was postponed (later a second time) due to Paks's employees being diagnosed with bacterial infections.

16 April 2016 30	Ferencváros	2–2	MTK Budapest	Budapest
20:30 CEST (UTC+2)	Pintér (yellow card) 10'; Čukić (yellow card) 25'; Z. Gera 59'; Varga 63', (yellow card) 63'	Report	Kanta 25'; D. Gera (yellow card) 30'; Vass (yellow card) 60'; Torghelle 77'; Hegedűs (yellow card) 88'	Stadium: Groupama Arena; Attendance: 5,043; Referee: Zoltán Iványi

20 April 2016 31	MTK Budapest	0–1	Puskás Akadémia	Dunaújváros
19:00 CEST (UTC+2)	Hajdú (yellow card) 26'; Kanta (yellow card) 50'; Torghelle (yellow card) 71'; Baki (yellow card) 90+3'	Report	Zsótér 32'; Zsidai (yellow card) 50'	Stadium: Dunaújvárosi Stadion; Attendance: 521; Referee: István Vad

23 April 2016 32	Videoton	5–0	MTK Budapest	Felcsút
18:00 CEST (UTC+2)	Négo 5', 83'; Grgić 10' (o.g.); Simon (yellow card) 44'; Tischler 64'; Suljić 65'	Report	Torghelle (red card) 24'; Baki (yellow card) 71'; Vass (yellow card) 85'	Stadium: Pancho Aréna; Attendance: 1,933; Referee: Sándor Andó-Szabó

30 April 2016 33	MTK Budapest	0–2	Vasas	Dunaújváros
16:30 CEST (UTC+2)	Grgić (yellow card) 45'; D. Gera (yellow card) 78'	Report	Vida 66'; Ristevski (yellow card) 80'; Pavlov 90+1'	Stadium: Dunaújvárosi Stadion; Attendance: 1,003; Referee: István Vad

=== Magyar Kupa ===
14 October 2015 Round of 32	Mezőhegyes	0–6	MTK Budapest	Mezőhegyes
14:00 CEST (UTC+2)		Report	Ramos 19'; Střeštík 45', 48', 78'; Thiam 57'; Deutsch (yellow card) 64'; D. Gera 73'	Stadium: Mezőhegyesi Városi Sporttelep; Attendance: 1,500; Referee: Tamás Nazsa

Round of 16

27 October 2015 First leg	Békéscsaba	0–0	MTK Budapest	Békéscsaba
15:15 CET (UTC+1)	Spitzmüller (yellow card) 20'; Punoševac (yellow card) 29'	Report		Stadium: Stadion Kórház utcai Attendance: 361; Referee: János Takács

17 November 2015 Second leg	MTK Budapest	0–1 (0–1 agg.)	Békéscsaba	Budapest
17:30 CET (UTC+1)	Grgić (yellow card) 48'	Report	Viczián (yellow card) 71'; Damjanović 84'; Piermayr (yellow card) 89'	Stadium: Stadion Rudolf Illovszky; Attendance: 170; Referee: Péter Solymosi
Note: Békéscsaba won 1–0 on aggregate.

=== UEFA Europa League ===
First qualifying round

2 July 2015 First leg	MTK Budapest (Hungary)	0–0	(Serbia) Vojvodina	Budapest, Hungary
20:30 CEST (UTC+2)	Torghelle (yellow card) 33'; Varga (yellow card) 49'; Vadnai (yellow card) 74'	Report	Puškarić (yellow card) 19'; Dinga (yellow card) 28'; Vasilić (yellow card) 46'	Stadium: Ferenc Szusza Stadium; Attendance: 902; Referee: Paolo Valeri (Italy)

9 July 2015 Second leg	Vojvodina (Serbia)	3–1 (3–1 agg.)	(Hungary) MTK Budapest	Novi Sad, Serbia
20:30 CEST (UTC+2)	Stanisavljević 14'; Maksimović (yellow card) 30'; Mrdaković 40'; Ivanić 51'; Nastić (yellow card) 84'	Report	Střeštík 3'; Thiam (yellow card) 37'; Vukmir (yellow card) 70'	Stadium: Karađorđe Stadium; Attendance: 8,460; Referee: Tore Hansen (Norway)
Note: Vojvodina won 3–1 on aggregate.

== Statistics ==
=== Overall ===
Appearances (Apps) numbers are for appearances in competitive games only, including sub appearances.
Source: Competitions

No.	Player	Pos.	Nemzeti Bajnokság I				Magyar Kupa				UEFA Europa League				Total			
No.	Player	Pos.	Apps	Goal	Booked	Sent off (straight red)	Apps	Goal	Booked	Sent off (straight red)	Apps	Goal	Booked	Sent off (straight red)	Apps	Goal	Booked	Sent off (straight red)
1	(Hungary) Lajos Hegedűs	GK	33		3						2				35		3	
2	(Hungary) Tibor Nagy	DF																
3	(Hungary) Bence Deutsch	DF	9				2		1						11		1	
4	(Hungary) Ákos Baki	DF	18	1	4		1								19	1	4	
5	(Croatia) Mato Grgić	DF	30		4	1	2		1		2				34		5	1
6	(Senegal) Khaly Thiam	MF	31	2	6		3	1			2		1		34	3	7	
7	(Brazil) Myke Ramos	FW	19	2	3		2	1			2				23	3	3	
8	(Hungary) Ádám Hajdú	MF	13	1	1		1								14	1	1	
9	(Montenegro) Darko Nikač	FW	12	2											12	2		
10	(Hungary) Lóránd Szatmári	MF	10	1			3				2				15	1		
11	(Hungary) Szabolcs Varga	FW	18		2		1				2		1		21		3	
12	(Hungary) Ferenc Tóth	DF					1								1			
13	(Hungary) Ádám Hrepka	FW	18	4	3		2								20	4	3	
14	(Hungary) Sándor Torghelle	FW	26	11	9	1	2				2		1		30	11	10	1
15	(Czech Republic) Marek Střeštík	MF	22	5	4		3	3			2	1			27	9	4	
18	(Hungary) Barnabás Bese	DF	33	1	1		1				2				36	1	1	
18	(Hungary) Imre Széles	DF																
19	(Hungary) József Kanta	MF	27	7	5		2				2				31	7	5	
21	(Serbia) Dragan Vukmir	DF	8		1		2				2		1		12		2	
23	(Hungary) Dániel Vadnai	DF	32	1	4		2				2		1		36	1	5	
24	(Hungary) Patrik Poór	DF	28		2		3								31		2	
28	(Italy) Federico Groppioni	GK					3								3			
30	(Hungary) Tamás Fadgyas	GK																
34	(Hungary) Attila Talabér	DF																
38	(Hungary) Ádám Vass	MF	28		13		2				2				32		13	
55	(Hungary) Bálint Vogyicska	MF	6		2										6		2	
56	(Hungary) Dániel Gera	FW	27	1	7	2	1	1			1				29	2	7	2
57	(Hungary) Ádám Schrammel	MF									1				1			
57	(Hungary) András Pintér	MF					1								1			
58	(Hungary) István Szatmári	MF	1				1								2			
59	(Hungary) Tamás Hujber	FW	5				1								6			
Own goals																		
Totals				39	74	4		6	2			1	5			46	81	4

=== Hat-tricks ===
No.	Player	Against	Result	Date	Competition	Round	Ref
15	(Czech Republic) Marek Střeštík	Mezőhegyes	6–0	14 October 2015	Magyar Kupa	Round of 32	

=== Clean sheets ===
			Clean sheets			
No.	Player	Games Played	Nemzeti Bajnokság I	Magyar Kupa	UEFA Europa League	Total
1	(Hungary) Lajos Hegedűs	35	12		1	13
28	(Italy) Federico Groppioni	3		2		2
30	(Hungary) Tamás Fadgyas	0				0
Totals			12	2	1	15
