= Kenan Hreljić =

Bosnian footballer

Personal information
- Date of birth: 1 December 1997 (age 28)
- Place of birth: Sarajevo, Bosnia and Herzegovina
- Height: 1.90 m (6 ft 3 in)
- Position: Centre-back

Team information
- Current team: SV Straelen
- Number: 4

Youth career
- –2013: Sarajevo
- 2013–2016: Slavija Sarajevo
- 2016–2017: MTK Budapest

Senior career*
Years	Team	Apps	(Gls)
2016–2017	MTK Budapest	0	(0)
2017–2018	Metalleghe-BSI	19	(2)
2018–2019	Mladost Doboj Kakanj	31	(0)
2020	Teuta	10	(2)
2020–2021	Čapljina	7	(2)
2021–2022	Igman Konjic	32	(4)
2022–2023	Liepāja	12	(1)
2023–	SV Straelen	3	(0)
- * Club domestic league appearances and goals as of 1 October 2023

Kenan Hreljić (born 1 December 1997) is a Bosnian professional footballer who plays as a centre-back for German Oberliga Niederrhein club SV Straelen.

== Career ==
=== Club career ===
Hreljić was born in Sarajevo and grew up in the Sarajevo before he went to Hungary.

=== MTK Budapest ===
Hreljić was promoted to the first team at the age of 19, although he never played for the first team, he was on the bench on one occasion. In the first round of the Magyar Kupa on 14 September 2016 against Oroszlányi, He sat on the bench for all 90 minutes.

=== Metalleghe-BSI ===
In August 2017, He signed for Metalleghe-BSI and returned to his country of birth. He scored his first goal in his professional career against Bosna Visoko on 8 October in the 10th round of First League of FBiH. In the only season in Jajce, he appeared nineteen times and scored two goals.

=== Mladost Doboj Kakanj ===
In July 2018, He signed for Premier League club Mladost Doboj Kakanj. He made his debut on 29 July against Sarajevo in a 4–0 defeat at the Koševo. In total, He appeared in 34 appearances for this club, thirty one times in the league and three times in the cup. He left the club in January 2020.

=== Teuta ===
After excellent matches in Mladost, He moved to the Albanian club Teuta. Having entered the first ninety minutes in Albania, he made his debut against Tirana in a 2–1 defeat. He won his first trophy against Tirana by winning the cup, but did not register a single minute in the final. Only twenty-nine days after he won the cup, he also won the Supercup, recording 45 minutes in a 2–1 victory. After eight months he left the club. After eight months he left the club.

=== Čapljina ===
Somewhat surprisingly, he signed for Čapljina, which was playing in the second tier at the time. He did not stay long in Čapljina because he left the club after just six months.

=== Igman Konjic ===
In February 2021, Hreljić signed for Igman Konjic. He became irreplaceable in the first eleven at the club. With Igman, he won another trophy by winning the league in the 2021–22 season. After excellent performances in the team from Konjic, he received many offers and left the club.

=== Liepāja ===
He signed a one-year contract with the club from Latvia with the right to an extension. He made his debut against RFS on the away field and the result was 2-2. In the coming month he played against Gjilani in the first round of the 2022–23 UEFA Europa Conference League qualifiers. He experienced the peak of his career when he played against Young Boys in the second qualifying round. In December of the same year, he did not reach an agreement to sign a new contract, so he left the club when the current contract expired.

== Honours ==
Teuta

- Albanian Cup: 2019–20
- Albanian Supercup: 2020

Igman Konjic

- First League of FBiH: 2021–22
