= Hidegkuti Nándor Stadion =

Multi-purpose stadium in Józsefváros, Budapest, Hungary

- MTK stadion
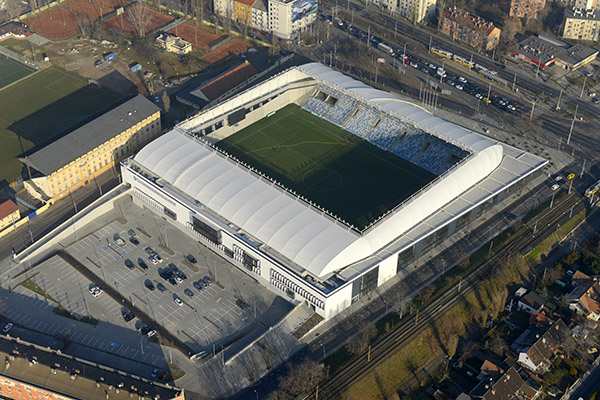
- Interactive map of Hidegkuti Nándor Stadion
- Full name: Hidegkuti Nándor Stadion
- Location: Józsefváros, Budapest, Hungary
- Coordinates: 47°29′27″N 19°6′24″E
- Owner: Government of Hungary
- Operator: MTK Budapest
- Capacity: 5,322
- Surface: Grass; Field
- Field size: 105 m × 68 m (344 ft × 223 ft)

Construction
- Groundbreaking: 2015
- Built: 2015–16
- Opened: 2016
- Cost: 7,26 billion HUF
- Architect: Péter Bordás

Tenants
- MTK Budapest; Vasas (2017); Hungary U17 (2017); Budapest Honvéd (2018–2021)

Hidegkuti Nándor Stadion (English: Nándor Hidegkuti Stadium) is a multi-purpose stadium in Józsefváros, Budapest, Hungary. The stadium was opened on 13 October 2016. It was named after MTK Budapest and Hungary football player Nándor Hidegkuti (1922–2002). It is currently used for football matches and is the home stadium of MTK.

== History ==
=== Planning ===
Tamás Deutsch, Member of European Parliament and president of MTK Budapest, announced that in 2016 a new stadium will be built, budgeted between 6 and 6.5 billion HUF. The new facility would host approximately 5000 spectators and be the home of the Sándor Károly Football Academy. The first phase of the construction would start at the end of the 2013–14 Hungarian League season with the demolition of the current stadium. During the construction the club would play their matches another stadium Budapest and decided by the fans of the club.

On 4 November 2014, the construction budget of the new stadium was made public. The Hungarian state would provide 1.39 billion HUF for the construction of a sports hall at the Lantos Mihiály Sportelep, 3.91 billion HUF for the reconstruction of the Nándor Hidegkuti stadium, and 350 million HUF for the training pitch next to the stadium. Altogether 5.65 billion HUF.

On 5 December 2014, the first drafts of the new stadium were published on the official website of the club. The tender was won by Bord Építész Stúdió Kft, led by Péter Bordás. The new stadium would be able to host just over 5000 spectators and planned to open the summer of 2016. The planned UEFA stadium category of the new stadium would be Category 3 which requires a minimum seating capacity of 4500 and at least 250 VIP seats.

On 12 December 2014, new photos of the new stadium were published on the website of the club.

On 18 June 2015, the new plans were revealed by the Hungarian epiteszforum.hu. The plans were delivered by designers of two companies, Sportarchitects and Azmpl.

=== Demolition ===
On 6 November 2014, the demolition of the stadium started. First the floodlights system was uninstalled and then the seats were removed.

In May 2015 the demolition of the main stand started.

=== Construction ===
On 6 November 2014, the demolition of the old stadium started by removing the old seats and the lights system.

On 16 November 2015, the foundation stone of the new stadium was laid. Tamás Deutsch, president of the club, said that it is an important step in the life of the club and its supporters. At the ceremony, Kálmán Szekrényessy's great-great-grandchild, founding member of the club, József Kanta, the captain of the MTK Budapest FC in the 2015–16 Nemzeti Bajnokság I season, Olivér Horváth and Maja Pásztor, representative of the Sándor Károly Academy, were present.

On 9 December 2015, the first post was placed officially with the aid of two male MTK Budapest footballers Sándor Torghelle, Ákos Baki and one female Lilla Nagy. Until March 2016, another 165 posts will be placed.

On 7 July 2016, the grass became visible on the pitch of the stadium.

On 24 September 2016, the seats were mounted on both the east and west stands in three different colours: white, light blue and dark blue. The colors of the seats were distributed randomly to hide the effects of low attendances.

On 6 October 2016, the displays were tested by broadcasting a scene from a pornographic film starring Hungarian pornographic actress Michelle Wilde.

The final cost for the building of the stadium was publicly announced to be 7.26 billion forints ($26 million), which was above its budgeted 6 to 6.5 billion forints despite much of the stadium being built with prefabricated materials and the construction period lasting just nine months.

=== Opening ===
On 13 October 2016, the stadium was officially opened with the MTK Budapest–Sporting friendly match. Sporting Clube de Portugal brought only three players from their first squad (Azbe Jug, Ricardo Esgaio, and Matheus Pereira because the club have to play in the third round of the 2016–17 Taça de Portugal against F.C. Famalicão). At the opening ceremony, Viktor Orbán, prime minister of Hungary delivered a speech, followed by Member of European Parliament and president of MTK Budapest, Tamás Deutsch.

On 22 October 2016 the first Nemzeti Bajnokság I match was played in the stadium when MTK Budapest hosted Gyirmót FC Győr on the 13 week of the 2016–17 Nemzeti Bajnokság I season. The first goal was scored by the MTK icon Sándor Torghelle in the 75th minute of the match which finished a 1–0 victory.

Despite the optimism that the new home stadium brought, MTK Budapest was automatically relegated to the second division of Hungarian football, Nemzeti Bajnokság II, after finishing next to last in the Hungarian top division during the 2016–2017 season. Furthermore, the new stadium did not do much to boost their home attendance as their average in their stadium for NB I matches was a modest 2,327, below the league's average of 2,704.

On 23 March 2017 the first international match was played. Russia hosted Hungary in the 2017 UEFA European Under-17 Championship qualification Elite round. The match ended with a 2–1 victory for Hungary. The first goal was scored by the Russian Prutsev in the 16th minute. While Szoboszlai of Hungary equalized in the 74th minute and scored again in the 84th minute to win the match.

On 5 April 2017, the first Magyar Kupa was match was played. The hosts were not the MTK Budapest because they were eliminated earlier from the 2016–17 Magyar Kupa season by Dorog but Vasas SC. Since the Illovszky Rudolf Stadion was demolished, Vasas SC's home, Vasas hosted Újpest FC at the Hidegkuti Nándor Stadion. The final result was 0–1 but Vasas qualified for the next round on 2–2 aggregate. The only goal was scored by Nemanja Andrić in the injury stoppage time of the first half.

On 27 October 2017, one part of the membrane roof was damaged by the Storm Herwart. Two strips of membrane over the east stand were damaged enough to force their removal. Cost of the repairs will be covered by insurance.

== Tenants ==
The main tenant of the stadium is MTK Budapest FC. However, apart from association football matches, American football matches are also played in the stadium.

In the 2018–19 Nemzeti Bajnokság I and the 2018–19 Magyar Kupa season Budapest Honvéd FC played their home matches in the stadium during the reconstruction of the Bozsik József Stadion.

== Milestone matches ==
13 October 2016	MTK Budapest (Hungary)	2–2	(Portugal) Sporting	Friendly match Opening match
	Kanta 44' (p.); Poór 76'	(Report)	Ronaldo Tavares 23'; Matheus Pereira 51' (p.)	Attendance: 4,800; Referee: Andó-Szabó

22 October 2016	MTK Budapest (Hungary)	1–0	(Hungary) Gyirmót	2016–17 Nemzeti Bajnokság I First Nemzeti Bajnokság I match
	Torghelle 75'	(Report)		Attendance: 1,183; Referee: Péter Solymosi (Hungary)

23 March 2017	Russia	1–2	Hungary	2017 UEFA U17 qualification First international match
15:30	Prutsev 16'	Report	Szoboszlai 74', 80+4'	Referee: Keith Kennedy (Northern Ireland)

5 April 2017	Vasas (Hungary)	0–1	(Hungary) Újpest	2016–17 Magyar Kupa; First Magyar Kupa match
20:30 CET		Report	45+2' Andrić	Attendance: 1,300; Referee: Gergely Szots (Hungary)

== Design Controversy ==
The original playing field was moved 90 degrees within the stadium's plot and thus narrowed its length with large grey concrete walls placed beyond each goal. This allowed planners more room along the east and west sides for 40 private skyboxes. Its comparatively large amount of private skyboxes to its overall modest seating capacity is a ratio that is almost unprecedented globally. After seeing photos of the newly built stadium many voiced displeasure at the prominence of walls behind the goals as it created a "very raw and imposing impression" (the popular pejorative nickname for them are the "wailing walls") and cast doubt on the safety of the stadium for players. Journalists from the Hungarian sport daily Nemzeti Sport measured and the distance between the walls and the goals and found that it conformed to UEFA regulations for stadium construction.

== Márton Fülöp goal ==
The southern goal was named after the former MTK Budapest FC and Hungary national football team goalkeeper Márton Fülöp who died at the age of 32 from cancer.

== Transport ==
Hidegkuti Nándor Stadion is located on the outskirts of the Józsefváros district of Budapest, Hungary. The stadium can be easily reached by public transport via tram 1 which travels along the Hungária Boulevard.

Service	Station/Stop	Line/Route	Walking distance from stadium
Budapest tram	Hidegkuti Nándor Stadion	1	100 m 2 mins

== Attendance ==
As of 19 May 2019

This table includes only domestic league matches. For the 2016–17 season, only matches from day 13 are included as they were played in this stadium.

Season	Total	High	Low	Average	Change	Ref.
2016–17 NB/I	25,594	4,368	1,183	2,327	—	
2017–18 NB/II	25,959	1,571	951	1,233	–53.0%	
2018–19 NB/I	39,565	4,587	1,381	2,393	+194.1%	

== Gallery ==
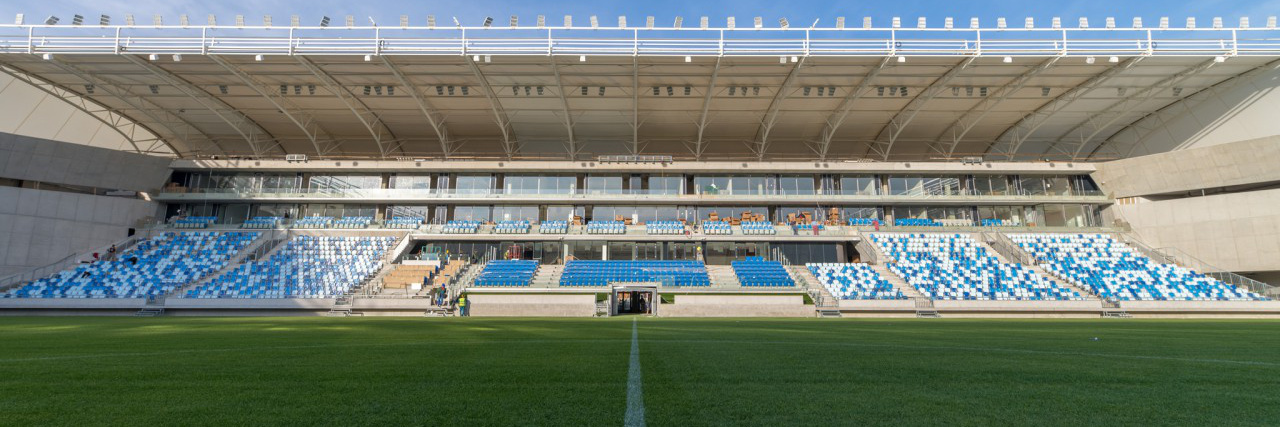
The main stand

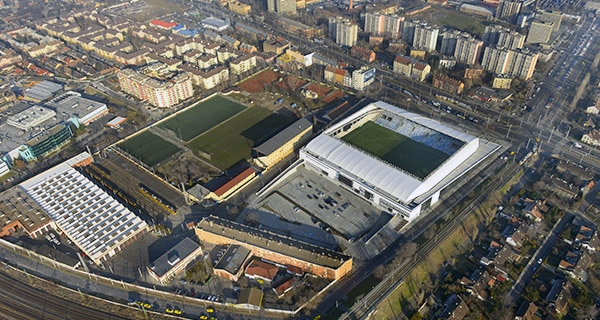
Aerial view of the stadium

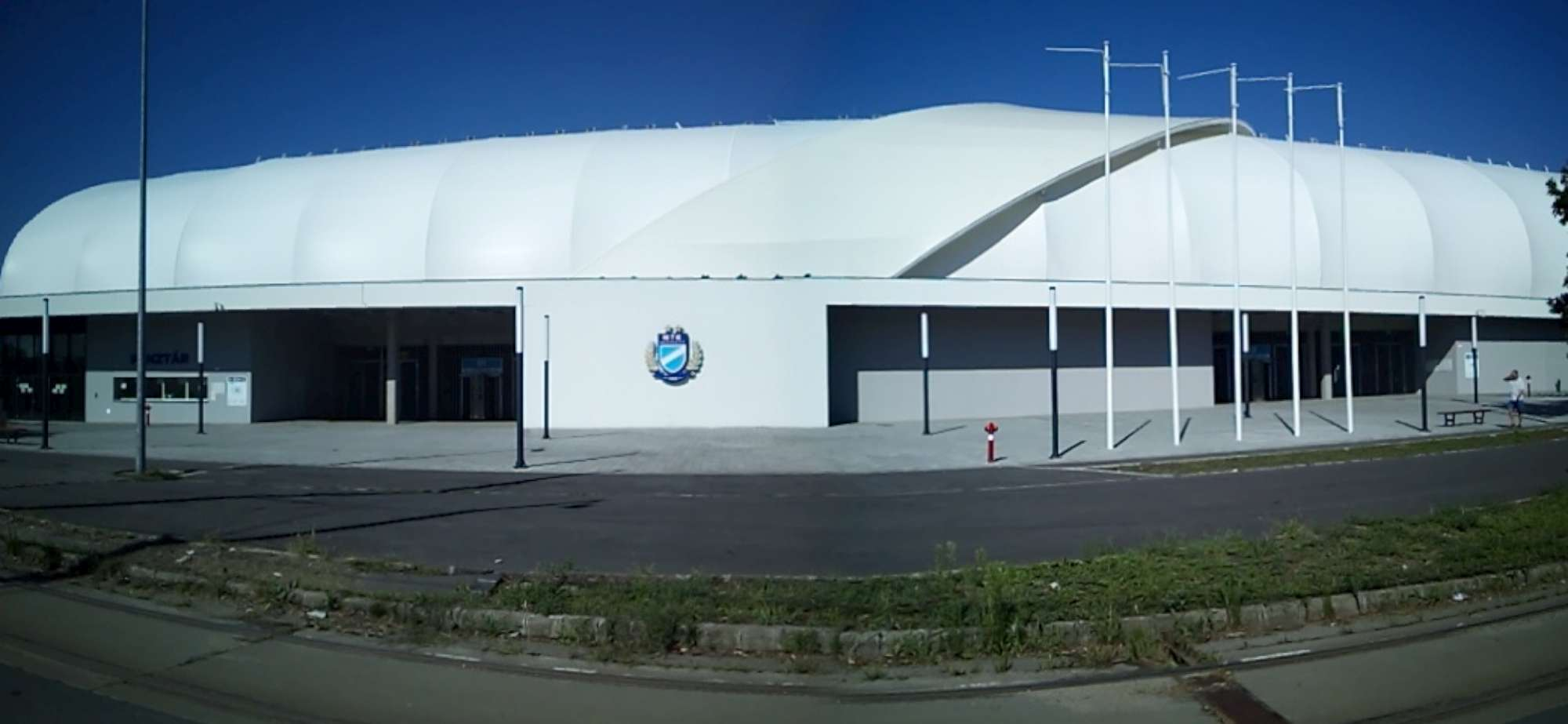
Exterior of Hidegkuti Nándor Stadion

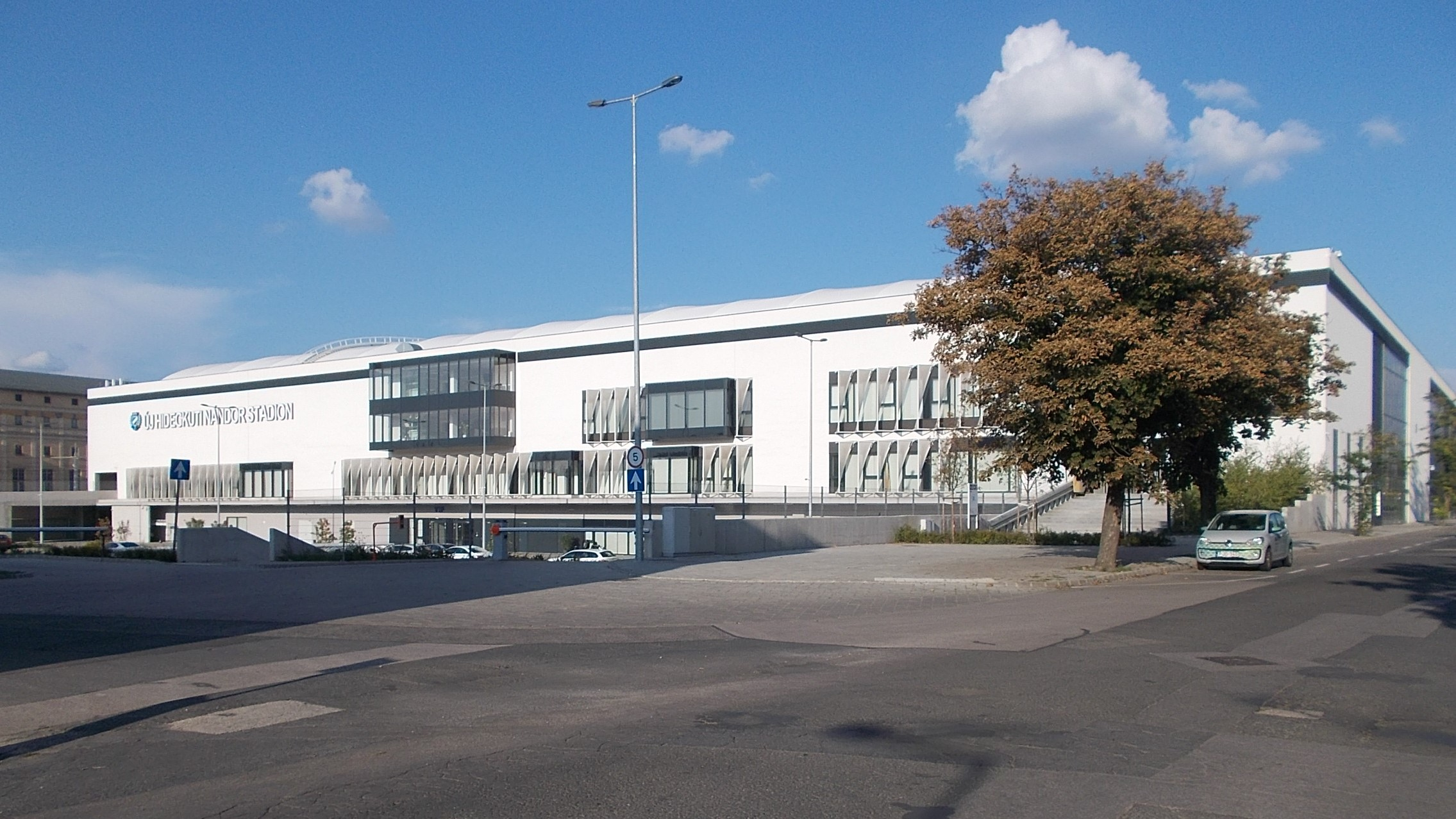
Exterior of the main stand

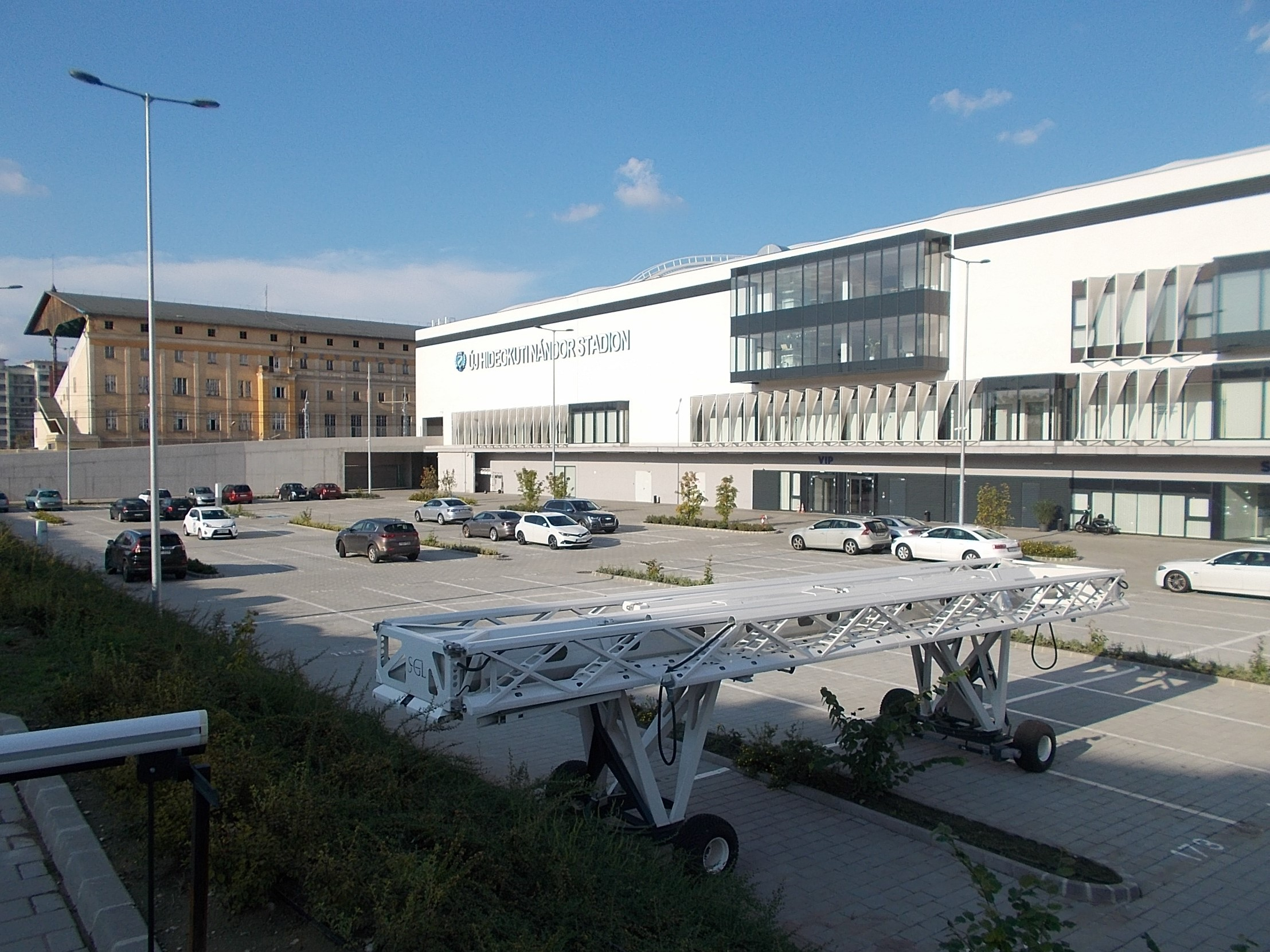
The parking lot

== See also ==
- List of football stadiums in Hungary
