= Kevin Korozmán =

Hungarian footballer

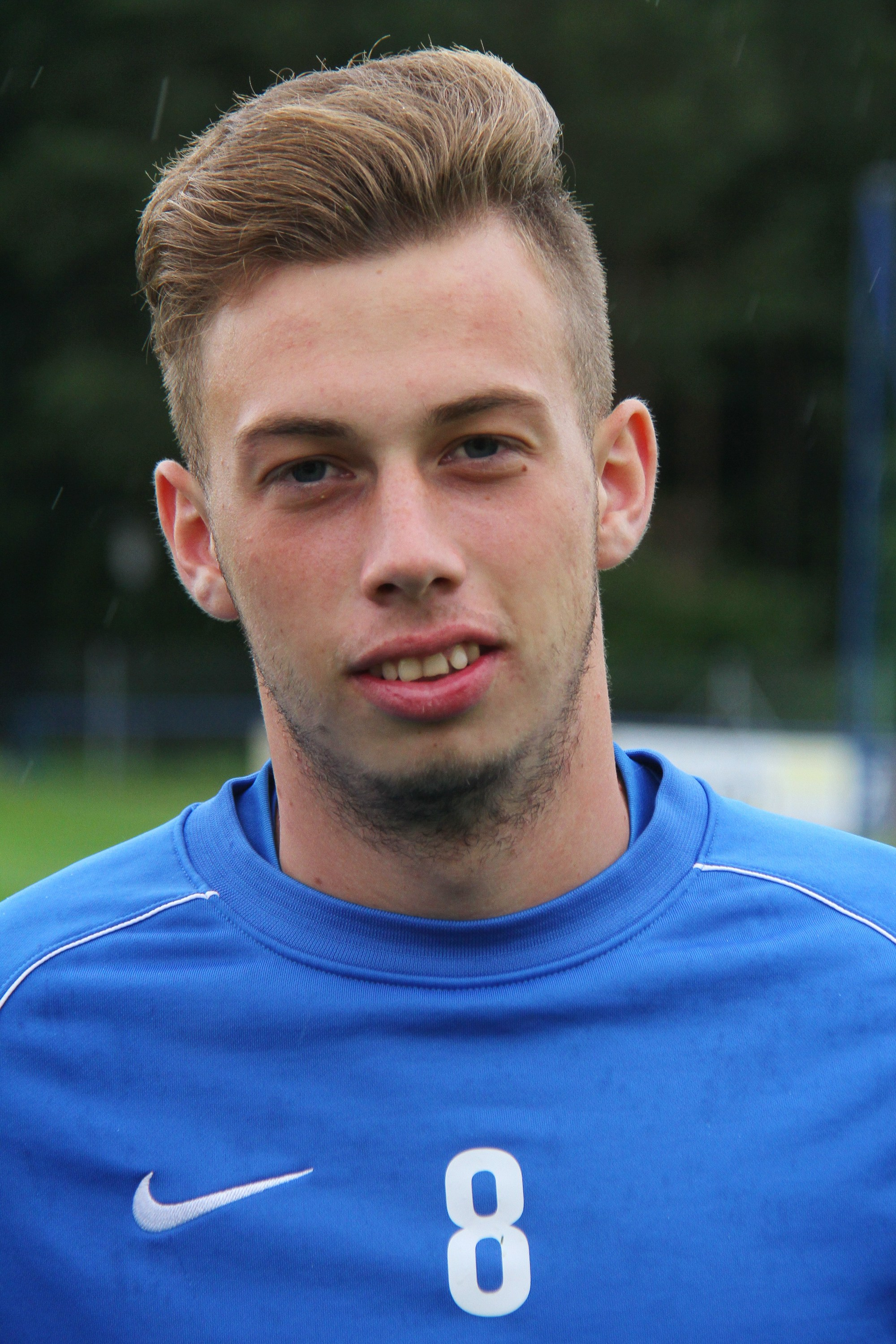

Personal information
- Date of birth: 2 March 1997 (age 29)
- Place of birth: Hungary
- Height: 1.79 m (5 ft 10 in)
- Position: Forward

Team information
- Current team: Soroksár SC
- Number: 7

Senior career*
Years	Team	Apps	(Gls)
2014–2016	Ferencvárosi	0	(0)
2015–2016	→ Soroksár SC (loan)	22	(1)
2016–2019	MTK Budapest	63	(2)
2019–	Soroksár SC	161	(34)

International career
2012–2013	Hungary U17	8	(1)
2015	Hungary U19	3	(1)
- * Club domestic league appearances and goals as of 31 May 2026

Kevin Korozmán (born 2 March 1997) is a Hungarian footballer who plays as forward for Soroksár SC in Nemzeti Bajnokság II.
