= Mato Grgić =

Croatian footballer

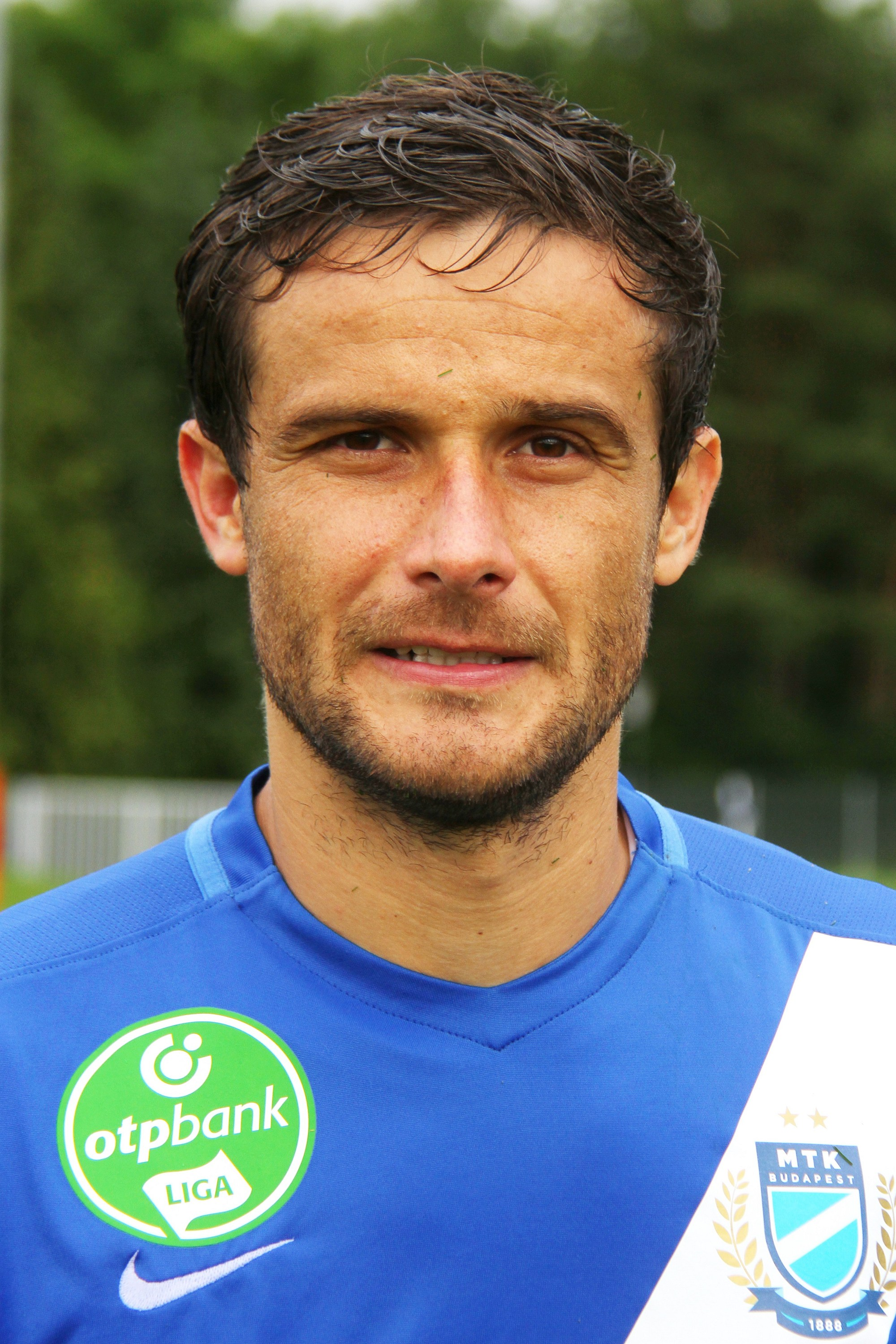
- Grgić with MTK Budapest in 2016

Personal information
- Date of birth: 27 September 1987 (age 39)
- Place of birth: Kotor Varoš, SFR Yugoslavia
- Height: 1.84 m (6 ft 1/2 in)
- Position: Defender

Team information
- Current team: Zagorec

Youth career
- 1996–2002: NK Kutjevo
- 2002–2006: Hrvatski Dragovoljac

Senior career*
Years	Team	Apps	(Gls)
2006–2011	Hrvatski Dragovoljac	98	(6)
2006	→ Rudeš (loan)		
2011–2015	Slaven Belupo	105	(5)
2015–2017	MTK Budapest	44	(0)
2017–2018	Inter Zaprešić	25	(0)
2018–2019	Northeast United	19	(0)
2019–2020	Mumbai City	13	(0)
2020–2021	Rudeš	29	(1)
2021-2023	Zagorec		
2023-	NK Bratstvo Kunovec		
- * Club domestic league appearances and goals as of 22:58, 7 July 2019 (UTC)

Mato Grgić (born 27 September 1987) is a Bosnian-born Croatian football defender, who plays plays for NK Bratstvo Kunovec.

== Club career ==
Born in Kotor Varoš, (now in Bosnia and Herzegovina) Grgić made his senior debut with Croatian Second Football League side Hrvatski Dragovoljac, in the 2012–13 season.

On 1 September 2018, NorthEast United FC signed Grgić from the Croatian side Inter Zaprešić. He was then acquired by Mumbai City FC in advance of the 2019–20 season.
