= Szabolcs Varga =

Hungarian footballer

Personal information
- Date of birth: 17 March 1995 (age 31)
- Place of birth: Székesfehérvár, Hungary
- Height: 1.85 m (6 ft 1 in)
- Position: Winger

Team information
- Current team: Bicske

Youth career
- 2003–2007: Videoton
- 2007–2013: Vasas

Senior career*
Years	Team	Apps	(Gls)
2013–2014	MTK Budapest	9	(2)
2014–2016	SC Heerenveen	0	(0)
2015–2016	→ MTK Budapest (loan)	18	(0)
2016–2019	MTK Budapest	8	(0)
2017	→ Soproni VSE (loan)	6	(0)
2018–2019	→ Vác FC (loan)	46	(1)
2019–2021	Szeged-Csanád	46	(3)
2021–2022	Békéscsaba	22	(0)
2022–2023	Dunaújváros	15	(1)
2023–	Bicske	4	(1)

International career
2010–2011	Hungary U16	2	(0)
2012–2013	Hungary U18	1	(0)
2012–2014	Hungary U19	10	(2)
2015	Hungary U20	3	(0)
2014–2016	Hungary U21	4	(1)
- * Club domestic league appearances and goals as of 12 March 2023

Szabolcs Varga (born 17 March 1995) is a Hungarian football player who plays for Bicske.

== Career ==
=== Early career ===
While playing for Vasas U19s, in 2012, Varga was named "Player of the Tournament" in the CEE Cup.

=== MTK Budapest ===
He started his adult career in MTK Budapest FC. He debuted in the Nemzeti Bajnokság I in the 2012–13 season.

=== Heerenveen ===
On 3 January 2014, Varga was signed by Eredivisie club Heerenveen S.C.

=== Békéscsaba ===
On 13 June 2021, Varga signed with Békéscsaba.

== International career ==
He was also part of the Hungarian U-19 at the 2014 UEFA European Under-19 Championship.

== Career statistics ==
Appearances and goals by club, season and competition
Club	Season	League			Cup		League Cup		Europe		Total	
Club	Season	Division	Apps	Goals	Apps	Goals	Apps	Goals	Apps	Goals	Apps	Goals
MTK
MTK	2012–13	Nemzeti Bajnokság I	1	0	0	0	0	0	0	0	1	0
MTK	2013–14	Nemzeti Bajnokság I	8	2	1	1	0	1	0	0	10	3
MTK	Total		9	2	1	1	0	1	0	0	11	3
Career total			9	2	1	1	0	1	0	0	11	3

Updated to games played as of 1 December 2013.
