= Oroszlányi SZE =

Hungarian football club

- Full name: Oroszlányi Szabadidő Egyesület
- Founded: 1995; 30 years ago
- Ground: Chudik Lajos Sporttelep
Home colours	Away colours

Oroszlányi Szabadidő Egyesület is a professional football club based in Oroszlány, Komárom-Esztergom County, Hungary, that competes in the Komárom-Esztergom county league.

== Name changes ==
- 1995–1996: Oroszlányi Torna FC
- 1996–2000: Oroszlányi Bányász SC
- 2000–2001: Oroszlányi Szabadidő Egyesület
- 2001–2004: Oroszlány-VÉRT
- 2004–present: Oroszlányi Szabadidő Egyesület
