= Ádám Vass =

Hungarian footballer (born 1988)

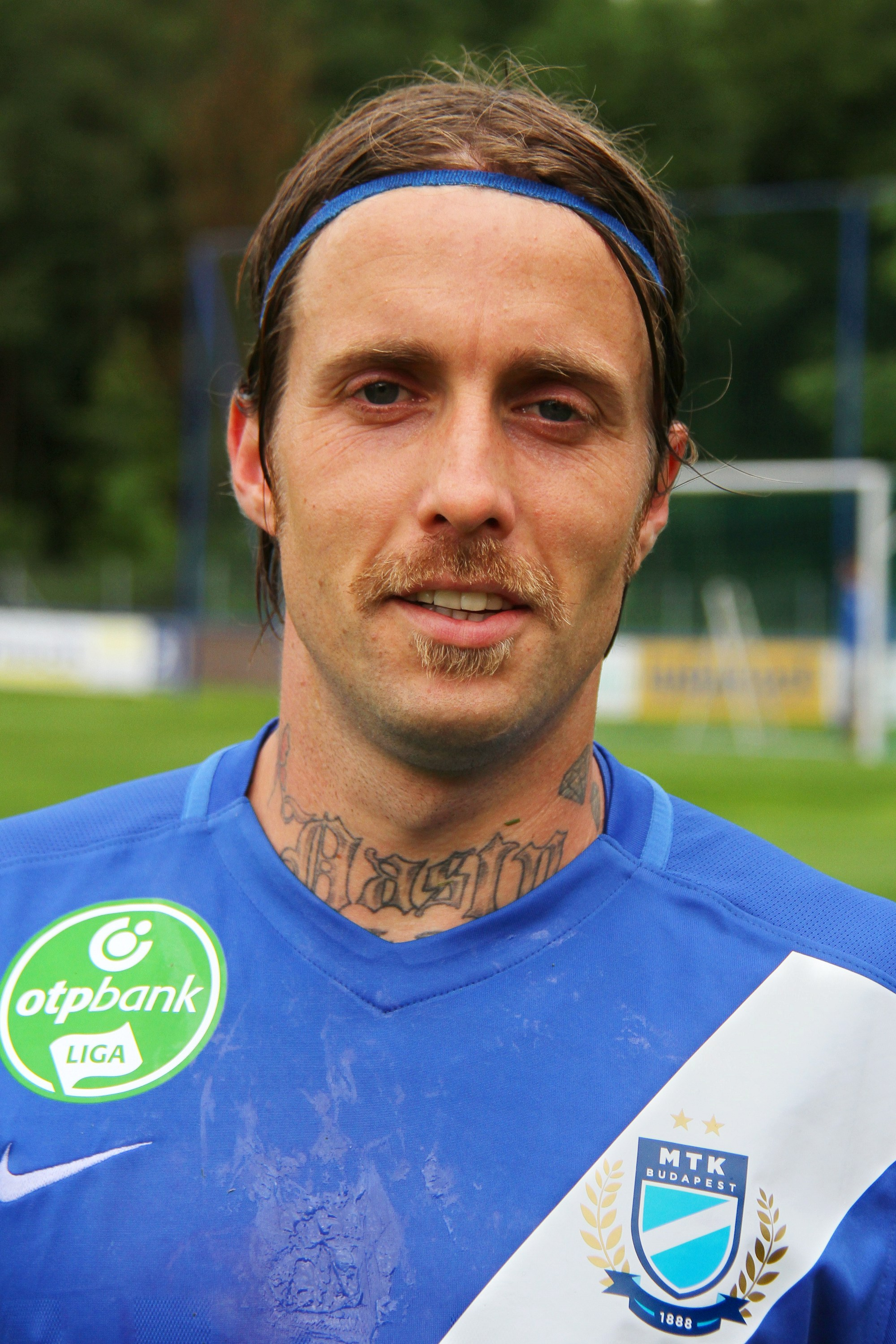
- Vass with MTK Budapest in 2016

Personal information
- Date of birth: 9 September 1988 (age 38)
- Place of birth: Kápolnásnyék, Hungary
- Height: 1.80 m (5 ft 11 in)
- Positions: Centre midfielder; defensive midfielder

Team information
- Current team: Soroksár
- Number: 8

Youth career
- 2003–2004: Ferencváros
- 2004–2007: Stoke City

Senior career*
Years	Team	Apps	(Gls)
2007–2012	Brescia	130	(3)
2012–2013	CFR Cluj	15	(0)
2013–2014	Oostende	4	(0)
2014–2019	MTK Budapest	157	(3)
2019–2023	Gyirmót	114	(1)
2023–	Soroksár	93	(0)

International career
2003–2004	Hungary U-17	8	(1)
2005–2006	Hungary U-19	10	(0)
2008	Hungary U-20	3	(0)
2008–2010	Hungary U-21	3	(2)
2006–2008	Hungary	11	(0)
- * Club domestic league appearances and goals as of 31 May 2026

Ádám Vass (born 9 September 1988) is a Hungarian footballer who plays as a defensive midfielder for Soroksár.

== Career ==
On 21 June 2019 it was confirmed, that Vass had joined Gyirmót FC Győr.

== Club statistics ==
Appearances and goals by club, season and competition
Club	Season	League		Cup		League Cup		Europe		Total	
Club	Season	Apps	Goals	Apps	Goals	Apps	Goals	Apps	Goals	Apps	Goals
Brescia
Brescia	2007–08	25	0	0	0	—		—		25	0
Brescia	2008–09	30	0	0	0	—		—		30	0
Brescia	2009–10	28	2	2	0	—		—		30	2
Brescia	2010–11	20	0	2	0	—		—		22	0
Brescia	2011–12	27	1	1	0	—		—		28	1
Brescia	Total	130	3	5	0	0	0	0	0	135	3
CFR Cluj
CFR Cluj	2012–13	15	0	1	0	1	0	2	0	19	0
CFR Cluj	Total	15	0	1	0	1	0	2	0	19	0
Oostende
Oostende	2013–14	4	0	1	0	—		—		5	0
Oostende	Total	4	0	1	0	0	0	0	0	5	0
MTK Budapest
MTK Budapest	2013–14	11	1	4	0	—		—		15	1
MTK Budapest	2014–15	27	0	0	0	8	0	—		35	0
MTK Budapest	2015–16	28	0	2	0	—		2	0	32	1
MTK Budapest	2016–17	31	0	2	0	—		4	0	37	0
MTK Budapest	2017–18	29	1	2	0	—		—		31	1
MTK Budapest	2018–19	29	0	0	0	—		—		29	0
MTK Budapest	Total	155	2	10	0	8	0	6	0	179	2
Gyirmót
Gyirmót	2019–20	26	0	2	0	—		—		28	0
Gyirmót	2020–21	38	0	2	0	—		—		40	0
Gyirmót	2021–22	29	0	1	0	—		—		30	0
Gyirmót	Total	93	0	5	0	0	0	0	0	98	0
Career total		397	5	22	0	9	0	8	0	436	5

Updated to games played as of 15 May 2022.

== International career ==
Vass has played for Hungary at under-17 and under-19 levels. On 15 November 2006, Vass made his début for the Hungary senior side against Canada. He became the youngest ever Stoke City player to become a full international until Dale Eve broke his record on 4 November 2011, aged 16.

== Honours ==
- Serie B: Third place 2009–10
- Young Hungarian Player of the Year: 2007
