= Sándor Torghelle =

Hungarian footballer

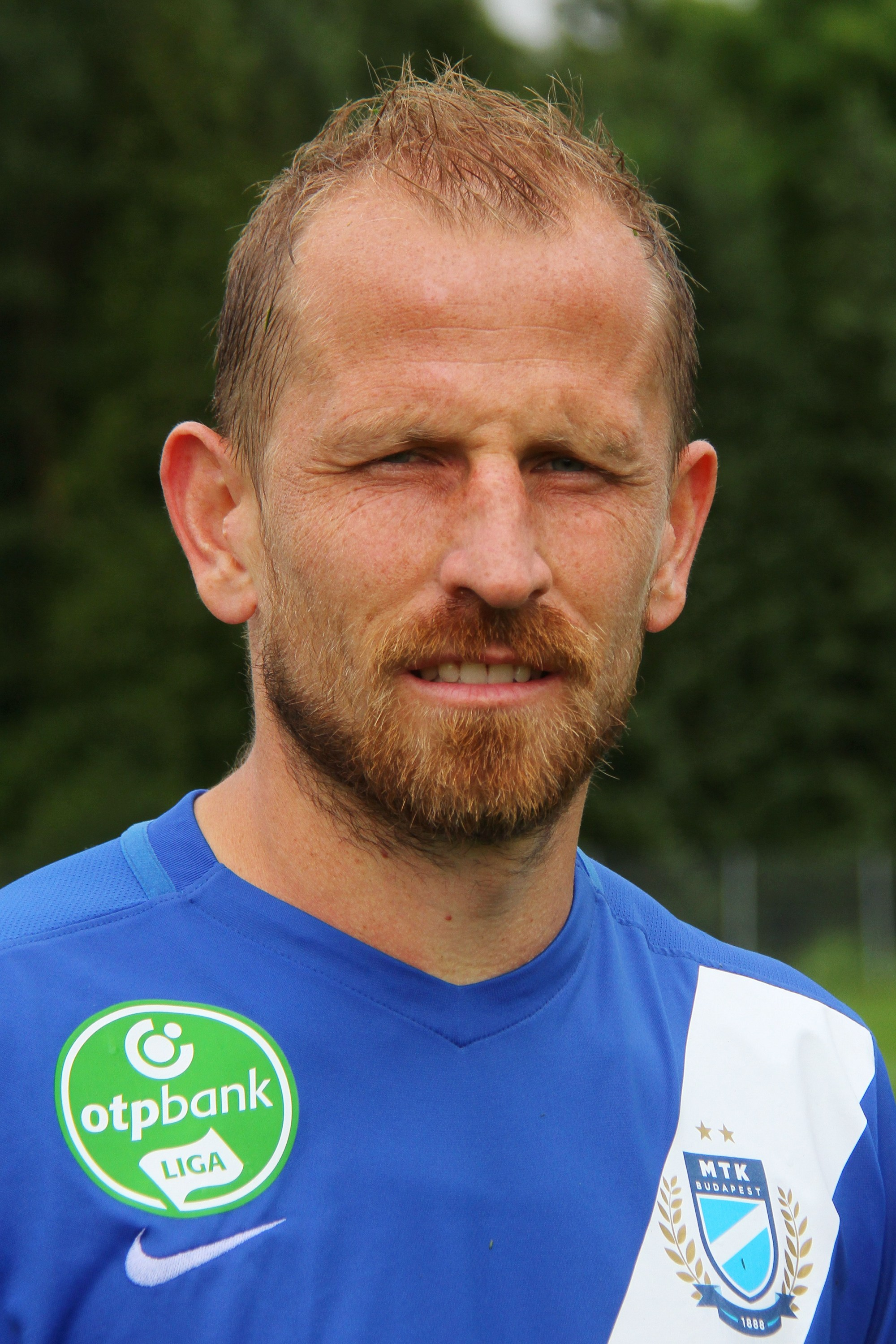
- Torghelle with MTK Budapest in 2016

Personal information
- Date of birth: 5 May 1982 (age 44)
- Place of birth: Budapest, Hungary
- Height: 1.85 m (6 ft 1 in)
- Position: Forward

Youth career
- –1999: Marcali
- 1999–2002: Honvéd

Senior career*
Years	Team	Apps	(Gls)
1999–2003	Honvéd	73	(15)
2001–2002	→ Marcali IFC (loan)	32	(14)
2003–2004	MTK Budapest	22	(9)
2004–2005	Crystal Palace	12	(0)
2005–2006	→ Panathinaikos (loan)	11	(0)
2006–2007	PAOK	24	(1)
2007–2008	Carl Zeiss Jena	27	(8)
2008–2010	FC Augsburg	48	(14)
2010–2011	Fortuna Düsseldorf	16	(1)
2011	Fortuna Düsseldorf II	1	(0)
2011	Honvéd	6	(3)
2012–2014	Videoton	35	(7)
2014–2019	MTK Budapest	138	(52)
2019–2020	Vasas	10	(2)
2026–2027	Triptolemos Eurixou		
Total			(126)

International career
1999–2000	Hungary U17	9	(2)
2000–2001	Hungary U19	3	(1)
2002–2003	Hungary U21	7	(2)
2004–2010	Hungary	42	(11)
- * Club domestic league appearances and goals

Sándor Torghelle (Hungarian: [ˈʃaːndor ˈtorɡɛllɛ]; born 5 May 1982) is a Hungarian former professional footballer who played as a forward. During his career, he played for Honvéd, Marcali, Crystal Palace, Panathinaikos, PAOK, Carl Zeiss Jena, FC Augsburg, Fortuna Düsseldorf, Videoton, and Vasas. He played 42 games for the Hungary national team between 2004 and 2010.

== Club career ==
=== Crystal Palace ===
After developing in Hungary and playing for Budapest Honvéd, Marcali VFC and MTK Hungária, Torghelle signed for Crystal Palace, in August 2004 for a fee of roughly £750,000. He caught their eyes after scoring both goals for Hungary national team in their shock international friendly 2–0 victory over Germany in Kaiserslautern before UEFA Euro 2004. He wore the number 10 shirt, that of a first-choice striker, but found it hard to gain a regular place in the Crystal Palace starting eleven with Andy Johnson often playing as a lone striker. He scored only one goal in a League Cup match against Charlton, but the referee sent him off late in the game for diving.

After 12 months at Palace, Torghelle was first stripped of his first-team squad number (given number 30, while 10 went to new signing Jon Macken), and shortly after was loaned out to Panathinaikos in Greece for the 2005–06 season. In the deal, there was no clause for re-calling him, so he spent the whole season in Greece. However, he failed to impress, and Panathinaikos chose not to make the deal permanent.

=== PAOK ===
Torghelle was transferred to PAOK in Greece and handed a three-year contract, being one of the three players that were traded for the transfer of striker Dimitris Salpingidis.

He was also famous for his failure to score even a single goal since he was transferred from Crystal Palace, yet this "curse" was lifted when he scored in a PAOK-Olympiakos derby in early 2007. He left PAOK at the end of the 2006–07 season for 2. Bundesliga team Carl Zeiss Jena. There, he finally met the expectations, scoring eight goals over the course of the 2007–08 2. Bundesliga season. Carl Zeiss Jena finished in last place and was relegated to the new 3. Liga.

=== FC Augsburg ===
Torghelle transferred to 2. Bundesliga team FC Augsburg before the start of the 2008–09 season. He played two seasons for the largest team in Swabian Bavaria.

=== Fortuna Düsseldorf ===
On 17 May 2010, Torghelle left FC Augsburg and signed with another 2. Bundesliga team Fortuna Düsseldorf.

=== Budapest Honvéd ===
Torghelle signed with former club Honvéd in August 2011. That reunion was short-lived and he signed for fellow Hungarian National Championship team Videoton FC in January 2012.

== International career ==
Torghelle made 42 appearances for the Hungary national team. He scored several decisive ones during the 2010 World Cup Qualification campaign, such as against Albania and Malta. He came to prominence after scoring both goals in a 2–0 victory over Germany in a friendly match in 2004.

== Career statistics ==
=== Club ===
Appearances and goals by club, season and competition
Club	Season	League			National cup		League cup		Europe		Other		Total	
Club	Season	Division	Apps	Goals	Apps	Goals	Apps	Goals	Apps	Goals	Apps	Goals	Apps	Goals
Budapest Honvéd	1999–2000	Nemzeti Bajnokság I	7	0			–		–		–		7	0
Budapest Honvéd	2000–01	Nemzeti Bajnokság I	21	1			–		–		–		21	1
Budapest Honvéd	2001–02	Nemzeti Bajnokság I	18	4			–		–		–		18	4
Budapest Honvéd	2002–03	Nemzeti Bajnokság I	27	10			–		2	0	–		29	10
Budapest Honvéd	Total		73	15					2	0	0	0	75	15
Marcali IFC (loan)	2000–01	Nemzeti Bajnokság II	10	7			–		–		–		10	7
Marcali IFC (loan)	2001–02	Nemzeti Bajnokság II	22	7			–		–		–		22	7
Marcali IFC (loan)	Total		32	14					0	0	0	0	32	14
MTK Budapest	2003–04	Nemzeti Bajnokság I	22	9			–		6	1	–		28	10
Crystal Palace	2004–05	Premier League	12	0	0	0	3	1	–		–		15	1
Panathinaikos (loan)	2005–06	Alpha Ethniki	11	0			–		5	0	–		16	0
PAOK	2006–07	Super League Greece	24	1			–		–		–		24	1
Carl Zeiss Jena	2007–08	2. Bundesliga	27	8	1	1	–		–		–		28	9
FC Augsburg	2008–09	2. Bundesliga	27	7	0	0	–		–		–		27	7
FC Augsburg	2009–10	2. Bundesliga	21	7	2	1	–		–		1 (Note: Appearance in relegation play-offs)	0	24	8
FC Augsburg	Total		48	14	2	1	0	0	0	0	1	0	51	15
Fortuna Düsseldorf	2010–11	2. Bundesliga	16	1	1	0	–		–		–		17	1
Fortuna Düsseldorf II	2010–11	Regionalliga West	1	0	–		–		–		–		1	0
Budapest Honvéd	2011–12	Nemzeti Bajnokság I	6	3	0	0	3	2	–		–		9	5
Videoton	2011–12	Nemzeti Bajnokság I	9	1	3	2	3	2	0	0	–		15	5
Videoton	2012–13	Nemzeti Bajnokság I	21	6	4	0	7	0	10	0	1 (Note: Appearance in Hungarian Super Cup)	0	43	6
Videoton	2013–14	Nemzeti Bajnokság I	5	0	1	0	4	1	0	0	–		10	1
Videoton	Total		35	7	8	2	14	3	10	0	1	0	68	12
MTK Budapest	2013–14	Nemzeti Bajnokság I	10	7	2	1	0	0	–		–		12	8
MTK Budapest	2014–15	Nemzeti Bajnokság I	22	6	1	0	6	1	–		–		29	7
MTK Budapest	2015–16	Nemzeti Bajnokság I	26	11	1	0	0	0	2	0	–		29	11
MTK Budapest	2016–17	Nemzeti Bajnokság I	26	9	0	0	0	0	4	2	–		30	11
MTK Budapest	2017–18	Nemzeti Bajnokság II	25	12	1	0	–		–		–		26	12
MTK Budapest	2018–19	Nemzeti Bajnokság I	29	7	2	1	–		–		–		31	8
MTK Budapest	Total		138	52	7	2	6	1	6	2	0	0	157	57
Vasas SC	2019–20	Nemzeti Bajnokság I	10	2	0	0	0	0	0	0	–		10	2
Career total			455	126	19	6	26	7	29	3	2	0	531	142

=== International ===
Appearances and goals by national team and year
National team	Year	Apps	Goals
Hungary	2004	11	4
Hungary	2005	7	2
Hungary	2006	7	1
Hungary	2007	0	0
Hungary	2008	5	3
Hungary	2009	9	1
Hungary	2010	3	0
Total		42	11

Scores and results list Hungary's goal tally first, score column indicates score after each Torghelle goal.

List of international goals scored by Sándor Torghelle
No.	Date	Venue	Opponent	Score	Result	Competition
1	28 April 2004	Budapest, Hungary	Brazil	1–3	1–4	Friendly
2	6 June 2004	Kaiserslautern, Germany	Germany	1–0	2–0	Friendly
3	6 June 2004	Kaiserslautern, Germany	Germany	2–0	2–0	Friendly
4	8 September 2004	Budapest, Hungary	Iceland	2–1	3–2	2006 FIFA World Cup qualification
5	15 August 2005	Budapest, Hungary	Argentina	1–1	1–2	Friendly
6	3 September 2005	Budapest, Hungary	Malta	1–0	4–0	2006 FIFA World Cup qualification
7	11 October 2006	Ta'Qali, Malta	Malta	1–1	1–2	UEFA Euro 2008 qualifying
8	11 October 2008	Budapest, Hungary	Albania	1–0	2–0	2010 FIFA World Cup qualification
9	15 October 2008	Ta'Qali, Malta	Malta	1–0	1–0	2010 FIFA World Cup qualification
10	19 November 2008	Belfast, Northern Ireland	Northern Ireland	1–0	2–0	Friendly
11	28 March 2009	Tirana, Albania	Albania	1–0	1–0	2010 FIFA World Cup qualification
