= 2024–25 Fehérvár FC season =

Fehérvár
2024–25 season
- President: István Garancsi
- Manager: Krisztián Tímár (From 15 April 2025)
- Stadium: Sóstói Stadion
- Nemzeti Bajnokság I: 11th (relegated)
- Magyar Kupa: Quarter-finals
- UEFA Conference League: Third qualifying round
- Top goalscorer: League: Nejc Gradišar (7); All: Nejc Gradišar (8)
- Highest home attendance: 9,160 v Debrecen, 24 May 2025, NB I, R33
- Lowest home attendance: 2,175 v Nyíregyháza, 8 Dec. 2024, NB I, R16
- Average home league attendance: 3,302
- Biggest win: 6–1 v Kecskemét, 3 Nov. 2024, NB I, R12
- Biggest defeat: 1–4 v Újpest, 11 Aug. 2024, NB I, R3, 0–3 v Puskás A., 22 Sept. 2024, NB I, R7, 0–3 v Debrecen, 24 May 2025, NB I, R33
- All statistics correct as of 24 May 2025.

The 2024–25 season was Fehérvár Football Club's 84th competitive season, 18th consecutive season in the Nemzeti Bajnokság I, 83rd year in existence as a football club. In addition to the domestic league, Fehérvár participated in this season's editions of the Magyar Kupa and UEFA Conference League.

== Kits ==
Supplier: Adidas / Sponsor: Tippmix

Adidas's Three Stripes trademark
Home	Home alt.	Away
Goalkeeper^{1}	Goalkeeper^{2}	Goalkeeper^{3}

=== Kit usage ===
We indicate in parentheses the number of round.

Kit	Combination									
Kit	Combination	Total			Nemzeti Bajnokság I		Magyar Kupa		UEFA Conference League	
Kit	Combination	Season	Home	Away	Home	Away	Home	Away	Home	Away
Home	Red shirt with blue stripes, red/blue sleeves, blue shorts and red socks.	26	16	10	DIO(2) ZAL(4) MTK(6) PAK(8) KEC(12) UJP(14) PUS(18) GYO(20) FER(21) DIO(24) ZAL(26) MTK(28) PAK(30)	UJP(3) PUS(7) GYO(9) FER(10) MTK(17) UJP(25) GYO(31)	DIO(R32)	MON(R64) GYI(R16)	SUM(QR2.2) OMO(QR3.2)	OMO(QR3.1)
Away	White shirt, white shorts and white socks.	14	3	11	DEB(11) NYI(16) DEB(33)	KEC(1) NYI(5) DIO(13) ZAL(15) PAK(19) DEB(22) KEC(23) NYI(27) PUS(29)		MTK(QF)		SUM(QR2.1)
Goalkeeper^{1}	Neon yellow shirt, neon yellow shorts and neon yellow socks.	21	6	15	DEB(11) KEC(12) NYI(16) MTK(28) DEB(33)	KEC(1) NYI(5) PUS(7) DIO(13) ZAL(15) MTK(17) PAK(19) DEB(22) KEC(23) UJP(25) NYI(27) PUS(29)		MON(R64) MTK(QF)	SUM(QR2.2)	SUM(QR2.1)
Goalkeeper^{2}	Black shirt with red stripes, black shorts and black socks.	19	13	6	DIO(2) ZAL(4) MTK(6) PAK(8) UJP(14) PUS(18) GYO(20) FER(21) DIO(24) ZAL(26) PAK(30)	UJP(3) GYO(9) FER(10) GYO(31)	DIO(R32)	GYI(R16)	OMO(QR3.2)	OMO(QR3.1)

DEB: Debrecen; DIO: Diósgyőr; FER: Ferencváros; GYI: Gyirmót; GYO: Győr; KEC: Kecskemét; MON: Monor; MTK: MTK Budapest; NYI: Nyíregyháza; OMO: Omonia; PAK: Paks; PUS: Puskás Akadémia; UJP: Újpest; SUM: Sumqayit; ZAL: Zalaegerszeg;
QR: Qualification Round; R64: Round of 64; R32: Round of 32; R16: Round of 16; QF: Quarter-final;

== First team squad ==
As of 14 February 2025

Note: Flags indicate national team as defined under FIFA eligibility rules; some limited exceptions apply. Players may hold more than one non-FIFA nationality.

No.	Pos.	Nation	Player
1	GK	HUN	Gergely Nagy
44	GK	HUN	Botond Kemenes (on loan from Veszprém)
57	GK	HUN	Martin Dala
3	DF	BUL	Simeon Petrov (on loan from (Poland) Śląsk Wrocław)
4	DF	HUN	Csaba Spandler (captain)
5	DF	GEO	Aleksandre Kalandadze (on loan from (Georgia (country)) Dinamo Tbilisi)
7	DF	CRO	Ivan Miličević
16	DF	HUN	Mario Simut
21	DF	HUN	András Huszti (on loan from Zalaegerszeg)
31	DF	MKD	Nikola Serafimov
33	DF	HUN	Kristóf Lakatos
87	DF	HUN	Milán Virágh
8	MF	UKR	Bohdan Melnyk
13	MF	HUN	Zsolt Kalmár
15	MF	HUN	Mátyás Kovács (on loan from MTK Budapest)

No.	Pos.	Nation	Player
18	MF	SVK	Bence Kovács
23	MF	HUN	Bálint Szabó (on loan from Paks)
27	MF	HUN	Bence Bedi
28	MF	SUI	Kristian Šekularac
30	MF	HUN	Gergő Ominger (on loan from Puskás Akadémia)
53	MF	HUN	Tamás Horváth
70	MF	HUN	Filip Holender (on loan from Vasas)
77	MF	HUN	Mátyás Katona
99	MF	HUN	Milán Pető
9	FW	SRB	Ivan Šaponjić
10	FW	KOS	Lirim Kastrati
11	FW	ARG	Nicolas Stefanelli
19	FW	HUN	Patrik Kovács
71	FW	HUN	Tamás Vid Tóth
74	FW	HUN	Bence Babos

Retired numbers

== Transfers ==
=== Summer ===
In: Note: Flags indicate national team as defined under FIFA eligibility rules; some limited exceptions apply. Players may hold more than one non-FIFA nationality.

No.	Pos.	Nation	Player
74	FW	HUN	Bence Babos (loan return from (Hungary) Ajka)
57	GK	HUN	Martin Dala (loan return from (Hungary) Nyíregyháza)
6	MF	FRA	Franck Bambock (loan return from (Greece) Panetolikos)
10	FW	KOS	Lirim Kastrati (loan return from (Croatia) Zagreb)
22	GK	HUN	Balázs Tóth (from (Hungary) Puskás Akadémia)
8	MF	UKR	Bohdan Melnyk (from (Hungary) Kisvárda)
27	MF	HUN	Bence Bedi (from (Hungary) Zalaegerszeg)
21	DF	HUN	András Huszti (on loan from (Hungary) Zalaegerszeg)
15	MF	HUN	Mátyás Kovács (on loan from (Hungary) MTK Budapest)
30	MF	HUN	Gergő Ominger (on loan from (Hungary) Puskás Akadémia)
70	FW	HUN	Filip Holender (on loan from (Hungary) Vasas)
7	DF	CRO	Ivan Miličević (from (Croatia) Lokomotiva Zagreb)
23	MF	HUN	Bálint Szabó (on loan from (Hungary) Paks)
97	FW	UKR	Daniel Kiwinda (from (Ukraine) Dnipro-1)
1	GK	HUN	Gergely Nagy (from (Greece) PAS Giannina)

Out: Note: Flags indicate national team as defined under FIFA eligibility rules; some limited exceptions apply. Players may hold more than one non-FIFA nationality.

No.	Pos.	Nation	Player
5	DF	HUN	Attila Fiola (End to contract)
33	DF	HUN	Barnabás Bese (to (Hungary) Újpest)
18	MF	HUN	Dávid Sigér (to (Romania) Sepsi)
11	FW	HUN	Levente Szabó (to (Germany) Eintracht Braunschweig)
42	GK	SRB	Emil Rockov (to (Bosnia and Herzegovina) Sarajevo)
21	MF	POR	Rúben Pinto (to (Portugal) Torreense)
65	DF	HUN	Szilveszter Hangya (End to contract)
44	DF	HUN	Bence Gergényi (to (Hungary) Újpest)
7	DF	HUN	Szabolcs Schön (to (England) Bolton Wanderers)
5	DF	HUN	Attila Fiola (to (Hungary) Újpest)
22	GK	HUN	Balázs Tóth (to (England) Blackburn Rovers)
23	FW	HUN	Marcell Berki (to (Hungary) Kecskemét)
20	MF	NOR	Tobias Christensen (to (Romania) Rapid Bucuresti)
6	MF	FRA	Franck Bambock (to (Cyprus) AEL Limassol)

=== Winter ===
In: Note: Flags indicate national team as defined under FIFA eligibility rules; some limited exceptions apply. Players may hold more than one non-FIFA nationality.

No.	Pos.	Nation	Player
44	GK	HUN	Botond Kemenes (on loan from Veszprém)
5	DF	GEO	Aleksandre Kalandadze (from (Georgia (country)) Dinamo Tbilisi)
9	FW	SRB	Ivan Šaponjić (from (Slovakia) Slovan Bratislava)
28	MF	SUI	Kristian Šekularac (from (England) Fulham)
3	DF	BUL	Simeon Petrov (on loan from (Poland) Śląsk Wrocław)

Out: Note: Flags indicate national team as defined under FIFA eligibility rules; some limited exceptions apply. Players may hold more than one non-FIFA nationality.

No.	Pos.	Nation	Player
97	FW	UKR	Daniel Kiwinda (Mutual agreement)
75	GK	HUN	Dániel Veszelinov (Mutual agreement)
—	MF	HUN	Máté Kecskés (on loan to Dorog)
9	FW	SLO	Nejc Gradišar (to (Egypt) Al Ahly)
3	DF	DEN	Kasper Larsen (Mutual agreement)
14	DF	HUN	Áron Csongvai (to (Sweden) AIK)

=== Out on loan ===
Note: Flags indicate national team as defined under FIFA eligibility rules; some limited exceptions apply. Players may hold more than one non-FIFA nationality.

No.	Pos.	Nation	Player
—	MF	HUN	Máté Kecskés (at (Hungary) Dorog (NB III) until 30 June 2025)

=== Contract extension ===
Note: Flags indicate national team as defined under FIFA eligibility rules; some limited exceptions apply. Players may hold more than one non-FIFA nationality.

No.	Pos.	Nation	Player
9	FW	SRB	Ivan Šaponjić (until 30 June 2026)
1	GK	HUN	Gergely Nagy (until 30 June 2026)
44	GK	HUN	Botond Kemenes (until 30 June 2026)
74	FW	HUN	Bence Babos (until 30 June 2026)

=== Managerial changes ===
Outgoing manager	Manner of departure	Date of vacancy	Position in table	Incoming manager	Date of appointment
(Sweden) Bartosz Grzelak	Signed by Újpest	14 June 2024	Pre-season	(Hungary) Tamás Pető	15 June 2024
(Hungary) Tamás Pető	Sacked	15 April 2025	8th	(Hungary) Krisztián Tímár	15 April 2025

== Friendlies ==
Win Draw Loss Fixtures

=== Pre-season ===
29 June 2024 Friendly	Bábolna SE (MB I)	0–9	Fehérvár	Bábolna
17:00 CEST		Report	Gradišar 8', 10'; Schön 17'; Katona 18'; Csongvai 20'; Berki 51'; B. Kovács 54', 73'; Simut 72'	Stadium: Bábolnai Sportpálya; Referee: Tamás Kreitl; Assistant referees: István Molnár, Viktor Frank
Note: Fehérvár 1st half: Dala — Melnyk, Larsen, Spandler, Schön — Csongvai, Christensen — Katona, M. Pető, Kastrati — Gradišar · Fehérvár 2nd half: Veszelinov — Serafimov, Lakatos, Kecskés — Simut, B. Kovács — Babos, Berki, Stefanelli — P. Kovács II

5 July 2024 Friendly	Fehérvár	3–2	Ajka (NB II)	Székesfehérvár
11:00 CEST '2×60 min.'	Schön 25'; M. Pető (yellow card) 45'; P. Kovács II 64'; Katona 114'	Report	Csizmadia (yellow card) 44'; Szvoboda 62'; Borsos 67'	Stadium: Sóstói Stadion; Referee: Sándor Andó-Szabó
Note: Fehérvár 1st half: B. Tóth — Melnyk, Serafimov, Spandler, Schön — Christensen, Csongvai — Babos, M. Pető, Kastrati — Gradišar · Fehérvár 2nd half: Dala — A. Huszti, Serafimov (Lakatos (substituted on) 91'), Larsen, Schön, Simut — Bedi, B. Kovács — Stefanelli, Berki, Katona — P. Kovács II

11 July 2024 Friendly	Hebar Pazardzhik (Bulgarian I) (Bulgaria)	2–5	Fehérvár	Kranjska Gora, Slovenia
17:30 CEST	Kabov 17'; Mihaylov 63'	Report	Christensen 14'; Katona 54'; M. Pető 69'; Larsen 79'; P. Kovács II 85'	Stadium: Kranjska Gora Stadion
Note: Fehérvár: B. Tóth (Veszelinov (substituted on) 61') — Melnyk (A. Huszti (substituted on) 77'), Serafimov, Spandler, Schön — Csongvai, Bedi (Larsen (substituted on) 73') — Katona (Babos (substituted on) 70'), Christensen (Stefanelli (substituted on) 65'), Kastrati (M. Pető (substituted on) 50') — Gradišar (P. Kovács II (substituted on) 65')

13 July 2024 Friendly	Dekani (Slovenian II) (Slovenia)	0–1	Fehérvár	Kranjska Gora, Slovenia
11:30 CEST		Report	Stefanelli 36'	Stadium: Kranjska Gora Stadion; Referee: Tilen Celjer; Assistant referees: Erazem Pahulje, Nik Jost
Note: Fehérvár: Dala (Veszelinov (substituted on) 60') — Simut, A. Huszti, Larsen, Kecskés (Spandler (substituted on) 56') — B. Kovács, M. Pető — Babos (Bedi (substituted on) 56'), Stefanelli, Berki (Csongvai (substituted on) 32') — P. Kovács II (Gradišar (substituted on) 56')

17 July 2024 Friendly	Göztepe (Turkey I)	2–2	Fehérvár	Bled, Slovenia
10:30 CEST	Ildız 33'; Kanatsızkuş 44'	Report	Christensen 16', 22'	Stadium: Športni center Referee: Andrej Žnidaršič; Assistant referees: Matej Žunič, Nik Jošt
Note: Fehérvár: B. Tóth — Melnyk, Serafimov, Spandler, Schön — Csongvai, Bedi (A. Huszti (substituted on) 82') — Katona (Babos (substituted on) 67'), Christensen (P. Kovács II (substituted on) 76'), M. Pető (Larsen (substituted on) 46') — Gradišar (Stefanelli (substituted on) 76')

=== In-season ===
5 September 2024 Friendly	Fehérvár	3–0	Gyirmót (NB II)	Székesfehérvár
11:00 CEST	M. Kovács 60'; Stefanelli 61'; B. Szabó 75'	Report		Stadium: Fehérvár FC Training Center; Attendance: 0 (closed doors)
Note: Fehérvár: Dala (Veszelinov (substituted on) 46') — Melnyk (A. Huszti (substituted on) 30'), Larsen (Virágh (substituted on) 75'), Spandler (Kecskés (substituted on) 72'), Miličević (Simut (substituted on) 30') — M. Pető (B. Kovács (substituted on) 46'), Bedi, M. Kovács (T. Horváth (substituted on) 72'), Katona (B. Szabó (substituted on) 55') — P. Kovács II (T. Tamás (substituted on) 55'), Holender (Stefanelli (substituted on) 55')

11 October 2024 Friendly	Fehérvár	2–3	BVSC-Zugló (NB II)	Székesfehérvár
11:30 CET	Babos 61'; M. Kovács 81'	Report	Batai 22'; Kocsis 41'; Pekár 43'	Stadium: Fehérvár FC Training Center
Note: Fehérvár 1st half: G. Nagy — Simut, A. Huszti, Spandler, Milicevic — Csongvai — Katona, B. Kovács, M. Kovács, M. Pető — Stefanelli • Fehérvár 2nd half: G. Nagy — Simut, A. Huszti, Larsen, Holender — Kalmár, Katona, B. Szabó, M. Kovács, Babos — T. Tóth

Winter training camp in Umag, Croatia, between 13–21 January 2025.

17 January 2025 Friendly	Brinje Grosuplje (Slovenian II) (Slovenia)	2–1	Fehérvár	Umag, Croatia
11:30 CET	Zorica 45+1' (pen.); Jasaragic 50'	Report	P. Kovács II 56'	Stadium: Umag Football Fields; Referee: Pecaric Goran (Croatia); Assistant referees: Catipovic Hrvoje, Marusic Nenad
Note: Fehérvár: G. Nagy — Lakatos, Spandler, Virágh — Simut, B. Szabó (B. Kovács (substituted on) 61'), Bedi, T. Horváth — M. Pető (T. Tamás (substituted on) 71'), M. Kovács (Babos (substituted on) 46') — P. Kovács II • Caretaker manager: Attila Polonkai

18 January 2025 Friendly	Tekstilac Odžaci (Serbian I) (Serbia)	1–5	Fehérvár	Umag, Croatia
11:30 CET	Barac 8'	Report	Gradišar 36'; Kalmár 59'; Holender 61'; M. Pető 70', 85'; B. Szabó (penalty missed)	Stadium: Umag Football Fields; Referee: Calic Mateo (Croatia); Assistant referees: Benikovic Patrik, Taranic Antun
Note: Fehérvár: Dala (Kemenes (substituted on) 79') — A. Huszti, Csongvai, Serafimov (Lakatos (substituted on) 84') — Holender, Melnyk, Kalmár (M. Kovács (substituted on) 68'), Miličević — Katona (M. Pető (substituted on) 60'), Stefanelli (B. Szabó (substituted on) 60') — Gradišar • Caretaker manager: Attila Polonkai

21 January 2025 Friendly	Kalcer Radomlje (Slovenian I) (Slovenia)	1–2	Fehérvár	Umag, Croatia
11:30 CET	Davidović 44'	Report	Stefanelli 27', 31'; Melnyk (yellow card) 72'	Stadium: Umag Football Fields; Referee: Vuckovic Ivan (Croatia); Assistant referees: Rozman Marin, Marusic Nenad
Note: Fehérvár: Dala (G. Nagy (substituted on) 46') — A. Huszti (Lakatos (substituted on) 66'), Csongvai, Serafimov — Holender (T. Horváth (substituted on) 76'), Melnyk (Babos (substituted on) 76'), Kalmár (B. Kovács (substituted on) 66'), Miličević (Simut (substituted on) 46') — Katona (B. Szabó (substituted on) 46'), M. Pető (M. Kovács (substituted on) 58') — Stefanelli (P. Kovács II (substituted on) 58') • Manager: Tamás Pető

25 January 2025 Friendly	Fehérvár	3–2	Szentlőrinc (NB II)	Székesfehérvár
13:00 CET	M. Kovács 22'; Stefanelli 48', 63'	Report	Papp 17'; Lazar 90'	Stadium: Training Center; Attendance: 0 (closed doors); Referee: Marcell Derdák; Assistant referees: Péter Kóbor, Péter Országh
Note: Fehérvár: Dala — A. Huszti (Spandler (substituted on) 46'), Csongvai, Serafimov (Lakatos (substituted on) 77') — Holender (B. Kovács (substituted on) 77'), Melnyk, Kalmár (Bedi (substituted on) 65'), Miličević (Simut (substituted on) 59') — M. Kovács (P. Kovács II (substituted on) 46'), M. Pető (Katona (substituted on) 59') — Stefanelli (Babos (substituted on) 65') • Manager: Tamás Pető

21 March 2025 Friendly	Fehérvár	2–1	Ajka (NB II)	Székesfehérvár
11:00 CET	M. Kovács 26'; Miličević 56'	Report	N. Kovács 68'	Stadium: Sóstói Stadion; Referee: Marcell Derdák; Assistant referees: Péter Kóbor, Péter Országh
Note: Fehérvár: Kemenes — Simut, A. Huszti (Virágh (substituted on) 46'), Spandler, Kalandadze, Miličević (T. Horváth (substituted on) 70') — M. Kovács (Ominger (substituted on) 78'), B. Szabó, Bedi (Melnyk (substituted on) 67'), Šekularac (Pintér (substituted on) 78') — Šaponjić (Holender (substituted on) 63') • Manager: Tamás Pető

== Competitions ==
=== Overall record ===
In italics, we indicate the Final position achieved in competition(s) that have not yet been completed.

Competition	First match	Last match	Starting round	Final position	Record							
Competition	First match	Last match	Starting round	Final position	Pld	W	D	L	GF	GA	GD	Win %
Nemzeti Bajnokság I	28/07/2024	24/05/2025	Matchday 1	11th	33	8	7	18	34	52	−18	24.24
Magyar Kupa	14/09/2024	03/04/2025	Round of 64	Quarter-final	4	3	0	1	8	5	+3	75.00
UEFA Conference League	25/07/2024	14/08/2024	Second qualifying round	Third qualifying round	4	1	1	2	2	4	−2	25.00
Total					41	12	8	21	44	61	−17	29.27

Last updated: 24 May 2025
Source: Soccerway

• Nemzeti Bajnokság I: Domestic league;
• Magyar Kupa: Domestic cup;

=== Nemzeti Bajnokság I ===
==== League table ====
Pos	Team	Pld	W	D	L	GF	GA	GD	Pts	Qualification or relegation
8	Nyíregyháza	33	9	9	15	31	52	−21	36	
9	Debrecen	33	9	7	17	52	59	−7	34	
10	Zalaegerszeg	33	7	13	13	35	42	−7	34	
11	Fehérvár (R)	33	8	7	18	34	52	−18	31	Relegation to the Nemzeti Bajnokság II
12	Kecskemét (R)	33	4	13	16	31	53	−22	25	Relegation to the Nemzeti Bajnokság II

Source: Hungarian Football Federation (in Hungarian)
Rules for classification: 1) Points; 2) Matches won; 3) Goal difference; 4) Goals scored; 5) Head-to-head points; 6) Head-to-head goal difference; 7) Fair play ranking; 8) Drawing of lots.
(R) Relegated

==== Results summary ====
Overall								Home						Away					
Pld	W	D	L	GF	GA	GD	Pts	W	D	L	GF	GA	GD	W	D	L	GF	GA	GD
33	8	7	18	34	52	−18	31	6	3	7	19	18	+1	2	4	11	15	34	−19

Last updated: 24 May 2025.
Source: Soccerway

==== Results by round ====
A = Away; H = Home; W = Win; D = Draw; L = Loss

Round	1	2	3	4	5	6	7	8	9	10	11	12	13	14	15	16	17	18	19	20	21	22	23	24	25	26	27	28	29	30	31	32	33
Ground	A	H	A	H	A	H	A	H	A	A	H	H	A	H	A	H	A	H	A	H	H	A	A	H	A	H	A	H	A	H	A	A	H
Result	D	W	L	D	D	W	L	L	L	L	W	W	L	L	W	W	L	W	L	L	L	W	D	D	D	L	L	D	L	L	L	L	L
Position	6	3	6	6	7	6	7	8	8	9	8	7	7	7	7	7	7	7	7	8	8	8	8	8	8	8	8	8	8	8	10	11	11
Points	1	4	4	5	6	9	9	9	9	9	12	15	15	15	18	21	21	24	24	24	24	27	28	29	30	30	30	31	31	31	31	31	31
Manager	P	P	P	P	P	P	P	P	P	P	P	P	P	P	P	P	P	P	P	P	P	P	P	P	P	P	P	T	T	T	T	T	T

Updated to match(es) played on 24 May 2025. Source: Matches
Notes:
Manager: • P Pető • T Tímár

==== Matches ====
Win Draw Loss Postponed

28 July 2024 1	Kecskemét	0–0	Fehérvár	Kecskemét
18:50 CEST	Szűcs (yellow card) 55'; Ba. Kovács (yellow card) 63'; L. Katona (yellow card) 90+5'; Nikitscher (yellow card) 90+5'	Report	A. Huszti (red card) 86'; Gradišar (yellow card) 90+4'; Schön (yellow card) 90+5'; Serafimov (yellow card) 90+5'	Stadium: Széktói Stadion; Attendance: 3,586; Referee: Tamás Bognár; Assistant referees: V. Tóth II, Z. Horváth
Note: FEHÉRVÁR: B. Tóth — A. Huszti, Serafimov, Spandler (Ominger (substituted on) 88'), Schön — Csongvai (c), Bedi — M. Katona (Larsen (substituted on) 61'), Christensen (Melnyk (substituted on) 79'), M. Pető (Má. Kovács (substituted on) 61') — Gradišar • Manager: T. Pető

3 August 2024 2	Fehérvár	3–1	Diósgyőr	Székesfehérvár
16:00 CEST	Serafimov 1'; Gradišar (yellow card) 11'; Babos 75'; M. Katona 90+4'	Report	Franchu 20'; Z. Varga (yellow card) 87'	Stadium: Sóstói Stadion; Attendance: 3,063; Referee: Csaba Pintér; Assistant referees: P. Kóbor, J. Aradi
Note: FEHÉRVÁR: B. Tóth — Melnyk, Spandler, Serafimov, Bedi — Larsen — M. Pető (Babos (substituted on) 71'), Christensen (Simut (substituted on) 90+3'), Csongvai (c), Má. Kovács (M. Katona (substituted on) 57') — Gradišar • Manager: T. Pető

11 August 2024 3	Újpest	4–1	Fehérvár	Budapest
18:00 CEST	Ljujić 24'; Brodić 42'; Nunes 47'; Tajti 53'	Report	Csongvai (yellow card) 57'; P. Kovács II 90'	Stadium: Szusza Ferenc Stadion; Attendance: 5,518; Referee: Balázs Berke; Assistant referees: Georgiou Theodoros, Norbert Bornemissza
Note: FEHÉRVÁR: B. Tóth — Miličević, Spandler, Serafimov, A. Huszti — M. Katona (Má. Kovács (substituted on) 46'), Christensen (Stefanelli (substituted on) 70'), Csongvai (c), Melnyk (Bedi (substituted on) 46'), M. Pető (Babos (substituted on) 70') — Gradišar (P. Kovács II (substituted on) 46') • Manager: T. Pető

18 August 2024 4	Fehérvár	1–1	Zalaegerszeg	Székesfehérvár
15:30 CEST	Spandler (yellow card) 37'; P. Kovács II 90+4'	Report	Dénes 54'	Stadium: Sóstói Stadion; Attendance: 2,763; Referee: Mihály Káprály; Assistant referees: Péter Kóbor, Dániel Szalai
Note: FEHÉRVÁR: B. Tóth — Melnyk (A. Huszti (substituted on) 46'), Spandler, Serafimov, Miličević (Holender (substituted on) 61') — Csongvai (c), Bedi — Má. Kovács (Stefanelli (substituted on) 46'), Christensen, M. Katona (P. Kovács II (substituted on) 61') — Gradišar (Berki (substituted on) 85') • Manager: T. Pető

25 August 2024 5	Nyíregyháza	3–3	Fehérvár	Nyíregyháza
17:45 CEST	Eppel 6'; Kovácsréti 40' (yellow card) 90+6'; Baki (yellow card) 65'; Babić 88'	Report	M. Katona (yellow card) 8'; Serafimov (yellow card) 22'; Spandler (yellow card) 34'; Gradišar 45'; Christensen (yellow card) 58'; Mi. Kovács 61' (o.g.); Alaxai 85' (o.g.); M. Pető (yellow card) 90+6'	Stadium: Városi Stadion; Attendance: 8,219; Referee: Tamás Bognár; Assistant referees: István Albert, Balázs Buzás
Note: FEHÉRVÁR: B. Tóth — Melnyk (A. Huszti (substituted on) 60'), Serafimov, Spandler, Miličević (Stefanelli (substituted on) 60') — M. Katona (Simut (substituted on) 72'), Christensen, Csongvai (c), Bedi (M. Pető (substituted on) 46'), Holender (Larsen (substituted on) 81') — Gradišar • Manager: T. Pető

30 August 2024 6	Fehérvár	1–0	MTK	Székesfehérvár
20:00 CEST	Gradišar 45+1'	Report	Varju (yellow card) 42'; Á. Molnár (yellow card) 86'	Stadium: Sóstói Stadion; Attendance: 3,014; Referee: Imre Kovács; Assistant referees: Gergő Vígh-Tarsonyi, István Szécsényi
Note: FEHÉRVÁR: Dala — Melnyk, Serafimov, Spandler, Miličević — Csongvai (c), M. Pető (Bedi (substituted on) 58') — Má. Kovács (Christensen (substituted on) 76'), Stefanelli (Simut (substituted on) 83'), M. Katona (Berki (substituted on) 83') — Gradišar (P. Kovács II (substituted on) 76') • Manager: T. Pető

22 September 2024 7	Puskás Akadémia	3–0	Fehérvár	Felcsút
16:30 CEST	Colley 12'; Plšek (yellow card) 53'; Nissilä 62'; Levi 78'	Report	Csongvai (yellow card) 58'	Stadium: Pancho Aréna; Attendance: 2,058; Referee: Mihály Káprály; Assistant referees: Vencel Tóth II, József Aradi
Note: FEHÉRVÁR: Dala — Melnyk, Serafimov, Spandler, Miličević — Csongvai (c), Bedi (Stefanelli (substituted on) 46') — M. Katona (B. Szabó (substituted on) 63'), M. Pető (Be. Kovács (substituted on) 80'), Holender (Má. Kovács (substituted on) 46' (substituted off) 76' (Kalmár (substituted on) 76') — Gradišar • Manager: T. Pető

29 September 2024 8	Fehérvár	1–2	Paks	Székesfehérvár
15:30 CEST	Miličević (yellow card) 41'; Holender 45' (yellow card) 71'; Larsen (yellow card) 18' (yellow-red card) 78'; Kalmár (yellow card) 84' (On the bench)	Report	Ötvös (yellow card) 38' (goal) 75' (pen.); Győrfi (yellow card) 65'; Kinyik (yellow card) 83'; Windecker 90+6'	Stadium: Sóstói Stadion; Attendance: 5,321; Referee: Ferenc Karakó; Assistant referees: Balázs Buzás, Norbert Bornemissza
Note: FEHÉRVÁR: Dala — Simut, Serafimov (M. Katona (substituted on) 62'), Larsen, Spandler, Miličević (Bedi (substituted on) 53') — Csongvai (c), Melnyk (M. Pető (substituted on) 35') — Holender, Gradišar, Stefanelli • Manager: T. Pető (yellow card) 77'

5 October 2024 9	Győr	3–1	Fehérvár	Győr
14:30 CEST	Štefulj 9'; Gavrić 14'; Boldor 90+3'	Report	B. Szabó 25' (pen.); M. Pető (yellow card) 28'; P. Kovács II (yellow card) 90+3'	Stadium: ETO Park; Attendance: 4,138; Referee: Csaba Pintér; Assistant referees: Vencel Tóth II, Dániel Szalai
Note: FEHÉRVÁR: Dala — Simut, Serafimov, Spandler, Bedi (Kalmár (substituted on) 60') — Csongvai (c) — Holender (Miličević (substituted on) 46'), B. Szabó, M. Pető (M. Katona (substituted on) 60'), Stefanelli (T. Tóth (substituted on) 77') — Gradišar (P. Kovács II (substituted on) 71') • Manager: T. Pető; Player of the match: Željko Gavrić, Győr 8.1 • Best player of Fehérvár: Nicolás Stefanelli 7.0 (Source:)

20 October 2024 10	Ferencváros	2–0	Fehérvár	Budapest
17:45 CEST	Saldanha 23'; Gartenmann (yellow card) 40'; Kady 56' (pen.); Kehinde (red card) 62'	Report	Simut (yellow card) 14'; Bedi (yellow card) 31'	Stadium: Ferencváros Stadion; Attendance: 11,105; Referee: Péter Antal; Assistant referees: Gergő Vígh-Tarsonyi, Norbert Bornemissza
Note: FEHÉRVÁR: Dala — A. Huszti, Serafimov, Spandler — Simut (P. Kovács II (substituted on) 76'), Bedi (Katona (substituted on) 84'), Csongvai (c), Má. Kovács (Stefanelli (substituted on) 59'), Holender — Gradišar, B. Szabó (Kalmár (substituted on) 76') • Manager: T. Pető; Player of the match: Dénes Dibusz, Ferencváros 7.8 • Best player of Fehérvár: Áron Csongvai, Nejc Gradišar and Martin Dala 7.2 each (Source:)

26 October 2024 11	Fehérvár	2–0	Debrecen	Székesfehérvár
17:15 CEST	Gradišar 37', 56' (yellow card) 67'; Má. Kovács (yellow card) 90+2'	Report	Ferenczi (yellow card) 46'; Pëllumbi (yellow card) 77'; Batik (yellow card) 63' (yellow-red card) 83'; Szuhodovszki (yellow card) 90+1'	Stadium: Sóstói Stadion; Attendance: 3,418; Referee: Tamás Bognár; Assistant referees: Balázs Buzás, Péter Kóbor
Note: FEHÉRVÁR: Dala — Simut, A. Huszti, Serafimov, Spandler, Holender — M. Katona (Má. Kovács (substituted on) 85'), Csongvai (c), Bedi (Kalmár (substituted on) 89'), B. Szabó (Stefanelli (substituted on) 66') — Gradišar (Larsen (substituted on) 85') • Manager: T. Pető; Player of the match: Nejc Gradišar, Fehérvár 9.1 (Source:)

3 November 2024 12	Fehérvár	6–1	Kecskemét	Székesfehérvár
17:00 CET	B. Szabó 18'; Bedi (yellow card) 45'; Gradišar 68'; Stefanelli 71', 90+2'; Kalmár 81'; Csongvai 90+5'	Report	A. Szabó (yellow card) 20'; Pálinkás 11' (yellow card) 44'; Rjaskó (yellow card) 56'; Be. Varga (red card) 88'	Stadium: Sóstói Stadion; Attendance: 2,683; Referee: Márton Rúsz; Assistant referees: Zoltán Horváth, Péter Ország
Note: FEHÉRVÁR: Dala — Simut (Melnyk (substituted on) 84'), A. Huszti, Serafimov, Spandler, Holender — M. Katona (M. Pető (substituted on) 84'), Csongvai (c), Bedi (Stefanelli (substituted on) 46'), B. Szabó (Kalmár (substituted on) 65') — Gradišar • Manager: T. Pető; Player of the match: Nicolás Stefanelli, Fehérvár 8.6 (Source:)

10 November 2024 13	Diósgyőr	1–0	Fehérvár	Miskolc
15:30 CET	Acolatse 4'; D. Gera (yellow card) 44'; Komlósi (yellow card) 58'; Holdampf (yellow card) 68'	Report	Serafimov (yellow card) 3'; Simut (yellow card) 70'; A. Huszti (yellow card) 77'; Csongvai (yellow card) 83'	Stadium: Diósgyőri Stadion; Attendance: 5,135; Referee: József Erdős; Assistant referees: Balázs Szalai, István Szécsényi
Note: FEHÉRVÁR: Dala — Simut (Má. Kovács (substituted on) 72'), A. Huszti, Serafimov, Spandler, Holender (Miličević (substituted on) 72') — M. Katona (Kalmár (substituted on) 46'), Csongvai (c), Bedi (Stefanelli (substituted on) 46'), M. Pető (B. Szabó (substituted on) 64)' — Gradišar • Manager: T. Pető; Player of the match: Nejc Gradišar, Fehérvár and Bence Bárdos, Diósgyőr 7.4 each (Source:)

23 November 2024 14	Fehérvár	0–1	Újpest	Székesfehérvár
18:30 CET	A. Huszti (yellow card) 41'; Csongvai (yellow card) 90'	Report	Nunes (yellow card) 48'; Tajti 64'; Dénes (yellow card) 69'; Ljujić (yellow card) 83'; Geiger (yellow card) 90+2'	Stadium: Sóstói Stadion; Attendance: 3,505; Referee: Gergő Bogár; Assistant referees: Balázs Szert, Dániel Szalai
Note: FEHÉRVÁR: G. Nagy — Simut (Miličević (substituted on) 61'), A. Huszti, Serafimov, Spandler, Holender (B. Szabó (substituted on) 76') — M. Katona (Stefanelli (substituted on) 61'), M. Pető (P. Kovács II (substituted on) 70'), Csongvai (c), Kalmár — Gradišar • Manager: T. Pető; Player of the match: Fran Brodić and Riccardo Piscitelli, Újpest 8.0 each • Best player of Fehérvár: Zsolt Kalmár 7.8 (Source:)

1 December 2024 15	Zalaegerszeg	0–1	Fehérvár	Zalaegerszeg
17:00 CET	B. Kiss (yellow card) 39'; Szendrei (yellow card) 48'	Report	Spandler (yellow card) 22'; A. Huszti (yellow card) 39'; Melnyk 71'	Stadium: ZTE Arena; Attendance: 1,937; Referee: Mihály Káprály; Assistant referees: Georgiou Theodoros, Balázs Huszár
Note: FEHÉRVÁR: G. Nagy — B. Szabó (Kalmár (substituted on) 72'), A. Huszti, Serafimov, Spandler, Holender — Stefanelli (Má. Kovács (substituted on) 60'), Csongvai (c), Melnyk (Simut (substituted on) 89'), Miličević (Bedi (substituted on) 89') — Gradišar • Manager: T. Pető; Player of the match: Gergely Nagy, Fehérvár 9.1 (Source:)

8 December 2024 16	Fehérvár	2–0	Nyíregyháza	Székesfehérvár
14:45 CET	Gradišar 70'; M. Katona 81' (pen.)	Report	Baki (yellow card) 69'; D. Nagy (yellow card) 83'; Myke (yellow card) 85'	Stadium: Sóstói Stadion; Attendance: 2,175; Referee: Marcell Derdák; Assistant referees: Balázs Szalai, Péter Ország
Note: FEHÉRVÁR: G. Nagy — Simut, A. Huszti, Serafimov, Spandler, Holender — Melnyk (Kalmár (substituted on) 69'), Csongvai (c), B. Szabó (Bedi (substituted on) 78') — Stefanelli (M. Katona (substituted on) 69' (substituted off) 90' (Miličević (substituted on) 90')), Gradišar (P. Kovács II (substituted on) 90') • Manager: T. Pető; Player of the match: Balázs Tóth, Nyíregyháza 8.2 • Best player of Fehérvár: Nejc Gradišar and Gergely Nagy 7.9 each (Source:)

14 December 2024 17	MTK	3–2	Fehérvár	Budapest
12:00 CET	Stieber (yellow card) 23'; Végh 27'; Á. Molnár (yellow card) 58'; Kosznovszky (yellow card) 61'; Jurina 86'; R. Molnár 90+6' (pen.) (yellow card) 90+7'	Report	Gradišar 2'; B. Szabó 68'; Holender (yellow card) 74'; Simut (yellow card) 80'; Spandler (yellow card) 82'; G. Nagy (yellow card) 90+5'	Stadium: Hidegkuti Nándor Stadion; Attendance: 2,051; Referee: Sándor Andó-Szabó; Assistant referees: István Albert, Balázs Buzás
Note: FEHÉRVÁR: G. Nagy — A. Huszti, Serafimov, Spandler — Holender, Melnyk (Bedi (substituted on) 83'), Csongvai (c), Kalmár (B. Szabó (substituted on) 46'), Simut — Stefanelli (M. Katona (substituted on) 70'), Gradišar • Manager: T. Pető; Player of the match: Rajmund Molnár, MTK 8.0 • Best player of Fehérvár: Nejc Gradišar 7.6 (Source:)

1 February 2025 18	Fehérvár	1–0	Puskás Akadémia	Székesfehérvár
17:00 CET	M. Katona 13'; Holender (yellow card) 35'; Csongvai (yellow card) 36'; A. Huszti (yellow card) 69'; Miličević (yellow card) 70'	Report	Colley (yellow card) 31'; Golla (yellow card) 51'; Maceiras (yellow card) 85'	Stadium: Sóstói Stadion; Attendance: 2,315; Referee: Csaba Pintér; Assistant referees: Vencel Tóth II, Péter Ország
Note: FEHÉRVÁR: Dala — A. Huszti, Csongvai (c), Serafimov — Holender, Melnyk, B. Szabó (Simut (substituted on) 79'), Miličević — M. Katona (Má. Kovács (substituted on) 61'), Stefanelli (Bedi (substituted on) 86'), M. Pető (Kalmár (substituted on) 61') • Manager: T. Pető; Player of the match: Mátyás Katona, Fehérvár 7.6 (Source:)

8 February 2025 19	Paks	2–0	Fehérvár	Paks
17:00 CET	Lenzsér 56' (yellow card) 80'; Böde 90+2'	Report	Simut (yellow card) 60'	Stadium: Fehérvári úti Stadion; Attendance: 2,245; Referee: Márton Rúsz; Assistant referees: Georgiou Theodoros, Dániel Szalai
Note: FEHÉRVÁR: Dala — Serafimov, Spandler, A. Huszti — Holender, Melnyk (P. Kovács II (substituted on) 83'), Kalmár (c) (Babos (substituted on) 69'), Miličević (Simut (substituted on) 57') — M. Katona (Šaponjić (substituted on) 69'), Stefanelli, M. Pető • Manager: T. Pető; Player of the match: Bence Lenzsér, Paks 8.4 • Best player of Fehérvár: Milán Pető 7.1 (Source:)

14 February 2025 20	Fehérvár	0–1	Győr	Székesfehérvár
20:00 CET	A. Huszti (yellow card) 16'; Holender (yellow card) 48'; Melnyk (yellow card) 49'	Report	Ouro (yellow card) 49'; Štefulj 72'	Stadium: Sóstói Stadion; Attendance: 2,583; Referee: Imre Kovács; Assistant referees: Gergő Vígh-Tarsonyi, István Szécsényi
Note: FEHÉRVÁR: Dala — A. Huszti, Spandler (c), Kalandadze (Má. Kovács (substituted on) 79') — Simut, Melnyk, B. Szabó, Holender (Miličević (substituted on) 84') — M. Katona (Šaponjić (substituted on) 57'), Stefanelli, M. Pető (Šekularac (substituted on) 57') • Manager: T. Pető; Player of the match: Daniel Štefulj, Győr 8.2 • Best player of Fehérvár: Csaba Spandler 7.5 (Source:)

23 February 2025 21	Fehérvár	1–3	Ferencváros	Székesfehérvár
18:00 CET	Simut (yellow card) 45'; B. Szabó 56' (pen.); Serafimov (yellow card) 57' (yellow-red card) 74'; Kalmár (yellow card) 78'; Šaponjić (yellow card) 84'	Report	Abu Fani 2'; Makreckis 7'; Ćirković (yellow card) 74'; Ben Romdhane 85'	Stadium: Sóstói Stadion; Attendance: 4,229; Referee: Mihály Káprály; Assistant referees: Balázs Buzás, Balázs Szalai
Note: FEHÉRVÁR: G. Nagy — Simut (M. Katona (substituted on) 46'), Petrov, Serafimov, Kalandadze (Kalmár (substituted on) 18'), Holender (Miličević (substituted on) 46') — Spandler (c), Melnyk (Šaponjić (substituted on) 46') — B. Szabó, Stefanelli, M. Pető (Má. Kovács (substituted on) 68') • Manager: T. Pető; Player of the match: Gergely Nagy, Fehérvár 8.6 (Source:)

2 March 2025 22	Debrecen	1–2	Fehérvár	Debrecen
14:00 CET	Vajda (yellow card) 51'; Domingues 59'; D. Kocsis (yellow card) 69'	Report	Šaponjić 8'; Bedi (yellow card) 34'; M. Katona 53'; A. Huszti (yellow card) 71'	Stadium: Nagyerdei Stadion; Attendance: 4,744; Referee: István Vad II; Assistant referees: István Szécsényi, Zoltán Horváth
Note: FEHÉRVÁR: Dala — A. Huszti, Bedi (Stefanelli (substituted on) 46'), Spandler (c), Petrov, Holender — Melnyk, B. Szabó (Šekularac (substituted on) 90+1') — Miličević, M. Katona (M. Pető (substituted on) 70') — Šaponjić (Kalmár (substituted on) 58') • Manager: T. Pető; Player of the match: Balázs Dzsudzsák, Debrecen 8.0 • Best player of Fehérvár: Martin Dala 7.8 (Source:)

7 March 2025 23	Kecskemét	2–2	Fehérvár	Kecskemét
20:00 CET	B. Katona 5'; Zsótér 41'; Botka (yellow card) 45+3' (yellow-red card) 81'	Report	Šaponjić (yellow card) 45+3' (goal) 65', 83' (pen.); B. Szabó (yellow card) 73' (yellow-red card) 76'; Simut (yellow card) 87'	Stadium: Széktói Stadion; Attendance: 2,168; Referee: Gergő Bogár; Assistant referees: Gergő Vígh-Tarsonyi, Ákos Berényi
Note: FEHÉRVÁR: Dala — A. Huszti, Bedi (Stefanelli (substituted on) 46'), Spandler (c), Petrov, Holender — Melnyk, B. Szabó (Šekularac (substituted on) 90+1') — Miličević, M. Katona (M. Pető (substituted on) 70') — Šaponjić (Kalmár (substituted on) 58') • Manager: T. Pető; Player of the match: Ivan Šaponjić, Fehérvár 8.1 (Source:)

16 March 2025 24	Fehérvár	0–0	Diósgyőr	Székesfehérvár
12:30 CET	Serafimov (yellow card) 33'; Melnyk (yellow card) 56'; Spandler (yellow card) 86'; Šaponjić (yellow card) 89'	Report	Chorbadzhiyski (yellow card) 20'; Lund (yellow card) 40'; Bényei (yellow card) 79' (yellow-red card) 90+2'	Stadium: Sóstói Stadion; Attendance: 2,794; Referee: Ferenc Karakó; Assistant referees: István Albert, Norbert Bornemissza
Note: FEHÉRVÁR: Dala — Serafimov, Petrov, Spandler (c) — Simut, M. Pető (Má. Kovács (substituted on) 77'), Melnyk, Bedi (M. Katona (substituted on) 69'), Holender (Miličević (substituted on) 81') — Stefanelli, Šaponjić • Manager: T. Pető; Player of the match: Siniša Saničanin, Diósgyőr 7.5 • Best player of Fehérvár: Nikola Serafimov, Simeon Petrov 7.2 each (Source:)

30 March 2025 25	Újpest	2–2	Fehérvár	Budapest
14:30 CEST	Bese 22'; Melnyk 40' (o.g.); Lacoux (yellow card) 90'; Fiola (yellow card) 90+2'	Report	Serafimov (yellow card) 4'; Šaponjić 58' (yellow card) 66'; Kalandadze (yellow card) 88'; B. Szabó 90+2' (yellow card) 90+10'; Melnyk (yellow card) 90+2'	Stadium: Szusza Ferenc Stadion; Attendance: 5,074; Referee: Tamás Bognár; Assistant referees: Vencel Tóth II, Balázs Szalai
Note: FEHÉRVÁR: Dala (c) — Serafimov (Bedi (substituted on) 81'), Petrov, Kalandadze, Miličević — M. Katona (Stefanelli (substituted on) 46'), B. Szabó, M. Pető (Šekularac (substituted on) 72'), Melnyk, Holender (Má. Kovács (substituted on) 55') — Šaponjić • Manager: T. Pető; Player of the match: Bálint Szabó, Fehérvár 7.9 (Source:)

6 April 2025 26	Fehérvár	0–2	Zalaegerszeg	Székesfehérvár
14:00 CEST	B. Szabó (yellow card) 54'; Šaponjić (yellow card) 57'	Report	Croizet 24', 55' (yellow card) 61'; Sanković (yellow card) 90+3'	Stadium: Sóstói Stadion; Attendance: 2,193; Referee: Gergő Bogár; Assistant referees: Zoltán Horváth, József Aradi
Note: FEHÉRVÁR: Dala — Petrov (M. Katona (substituted on) 46'), Spandler (c), Kalandadze — Simut (Holender (substituted on) 46'), M. Pető, Melnyk (Šekularac (substituted on) 78'), B. Szabó, Miličević (Má. Kovács (substituted on) 60') — Stefanelli, Šaponjić • Manager: T. Pető; Player of the match: Yohan Croizet, Zalaegerszeg 8.8 • Best player of Fehérvár: Bálint Szabó 7.4 (Source:)

13 April 2025 27	Nyíregyháza	1–0	Fehérvár	Nyíregyháza
19:00 CEST	Medved (yellow card) 16'; Keresztes 72'; Toma (yellow card) 90+2'	Report	A. Huszti (yellow card) 13'; Petrov (yellow card) 88'; Melnyk (yellow card) 25' (yellow-red card) 76'; B. Szabó (penalty missed) 80'; Spandler (yellow card) 90+3'	Stadium: Városi Stadion; Attendance: 4,255; Referee: Balázs Berke; Assistant referees: Balázs Szalai, Bence Belicza
Note: FEHÉRVÁR: Dala — Petrov, Spandler (c), Miličević — A. Huszti (M. Pető (substituted on) 78'), Melnyk, Bedi, B. Szabó, Holender (Simut (substituted on) 70') — Šekularac (Stefanelli (substituted on) 56'), M. Katona • Manager: T. Pető; Player of the match: Krisztián Keresztes, Nyíregyháza 8.4 • Best player of Fehérvár: Bence Bedi and Milán Pető 6.9 each (Source:)

20 April 2025 28	Fehérvár	1–1	MTK	Székesfehérvár
13:15 CEST	M. Katona (yellow card) 44'; Stefanelli 75'	Report	Kádár (yellow card) 28'; Varju (yellow card) 63'; Jurina 81'	Stadium: Sóstói Stadion; Attendance: 2,521; Referee: Márton Rúsz; Assistant referees: István Albert, Balázs Buzás
Note: FEHÉRVÁR: G. Nagy — Petrov, Spandler (c), Kalandadze — Simut (Holender (substituted on) 61'), M. Katona (M. Pető (substituted on) 61'), Bedi, B. Szabó, Miličević — Stefanelli (Má. Kovács (substituted on) 80'), Šaponjić (Kastrati (substituted on) 89') • Manager: Krisztián Tímár; Player of the match: Ivan Miličević, Fehérvár 7.9 (Source:)

26 April 2025 29	Puskás Akadémia	3–1	Fehérvár	Felcsút
15:15 CEST	Colley 27'; Zs. Nagy (yellow card) 41'; Levi 45+1'; Duarte 76'	Report	Spandler (yellow card) 11'; Simut (yellow card) 49'; Petrov (yellow card) 75'; Katona (yellow card) 90'; Kastrati 88' (yellow card) 90+1'	Stadium: Pancho Aréna; Attendance: 1,881; Referee: Gergő Bogár; Assistant referees: Gergő Vígh-Tarsonyi, Péter Ország
Note: G. Nagy — Simut (Holender (substituted on) 74'), Petrov, Spandler (c), Kalandadze, Miličević — B. Szabó (M. Katona (substituted on) 74'), Melnyk, Bedi (M. Pető (substituted on) 57') — Šaponjić, Stefanelli (Kastrati (substituted on) 83') • Manager: Krisztián Tímár; Player of the match: Jonathan Levi, Puskás Akadémia 9.0 • Best player of Fehérvár: Lirim Kastrati 7.3 (Source:)

4 May 2025 30	Fehérvár	0–2	Paks	Székesfehérvár
18:30 CEST	Simut (yellow card) 14'; Stefanelli (yellow card) 43'; Miličević (yellow card) 84'	Report	Böde 44'; Ötvös (yellow card) 59' (goal) 81'	Stadium: Sóstói Stadion; Attendance: 2,867; Referee: Mihály Káprály; Assistant referees: Balázs Szalai, Zoltán Horváth
Note: FEHÉRVÁR: Dala — Petrov, Spandler (c), Kalandadze — Simut (Má. Kovács (substituted on) 73'), M. Katona (M. Pető (substituted on) 55'), Bedi, Melnyk, Miličević — Stefanelli (Šekularac (substituted on) 73'), Holender (Kastrati (substituted on) 63') • Manager: Krisztián Tímár; Player of the match: Péter Szappanos, Paks 8.5 • Best player of Fehérvár: Csaba Spandler 7.6 (Source:)

9 May 2025 31	Győr	1–0	Fehérvár	Győr
20:00 CEST	Krpić 51' (yellow card) 58'; Njie (yellow card) 90+5'	Report	Má. Kovács (yellow card) 23'; Kalandadze (yellow card) 55'; B. Szabó (yellow card) 66'; Bedi (yellow card) 80'	Stadium: ETO Park; Attendance: 6,689; Referee: Márton Rúsz; Assistant referees: Norbert Bornemissza, Péter Garai
Note: FEHÉRVÁR: Dala — Petrov, Spandler (c), Kalandadze — Má. Kovács, Melnyk (M. Katona (substituted on) 82'), Bedi, Miličević (Simut (substituted on) 82') — B. Szabó (M. Pető (substituted on) 69'), Šaponjić (Holender (substituted on) 58'), Stefanelli (Kastrati (substituted on) 69') • Manager: Krisztián Tímár (yellow card) 81'; Player of the match: Heitor, Győr 7.9 • Best player of Fehérvár: Martin Dala 7.4 (Source:)

18 May 2025 32	Ferencváros	3–0	Fehérvár	Budapest
19:30 CEST	Gartenmann 12'; Pešić 51'; A. Tóth 83'	Report	Kalandadze (yellow card) 36'; Melnyk (yellow card) 54'	Stadium: Ferencváros Stadion; Attendance: 11,957; Referee: Mihály Káprály; Assistant referees: Georgiou Theodoros, Balázs Szalai
Note: FEHÉRVÁR: Dala — Má. Kovács (Ominger (substituted on) 83'), Petrov, Spandler (c), Kalandadze (Simut (substituted on) 57'), Miličević — M. Katona (T. Horváth (substituted on) 57'), Melnyk (B. Kovács (substituted on) 69'), B. Szabó — Stefanelli (Kastrati (substituted on) 69'), M. Pető • Manager: Krisztián Tímár; Player of the match: Eldar Ćivić, Ferencváros 9.0 • Best player of Fehérvár: Simeon Petrov and Nicolás Stefanelli 6.8 each (Source:)

24 May 2025 33	Fehérvár	0–3	Debrecen	Székesfehérvár
17:30 CEST	Bedi (yellow card) 36'; Melnyk (yellow card) 45+1'; Šaponjić (yellow card) 61'; Kastrati (red card) 70'	Report	Szuhodovszki 21'; G. Kocsis 66'; Domingues (yellow card) 70'; Youga (red card) 70'; T. Szűcs (yellow card) 72'; Maurides 85'	Stadium: Sóstói Stadion; Attendance: 9,160; Referee: Gergő Bogár; Assistant referees: Balázs Szert, Georgiou Theodoros
Note: FEHÉRVÁR: Dala — Petrov (Simut (substituted on) 82'), Spandler (c), Kalandadze — Má. Kovács (M. Katona (substituted on) 67'), Bedi (Kastrati (substituted on) 67'), Melnyk (T. Tóth (substituted on) 82'), Miličević — B. Szabó, Šaponjić, Holender (Stefanelli (substituted on) 60') • Manager: Krisztián Tímár; Player of the match: Maximilian Hofmann, Debrecen 8.0 • Best player of Fehérvár: Ivan Miličević and Filip Holender 7.2 each (Source:)

==== Results overview ====
All results are indicated from the perspective of Fehérvár FC.
We indicate in parentheses the number of round.
Win Draw Loss Postponed

Opposition	Round 1–22		Round 23–33		Double	Points
Opposition	Home score	Away score	Home score	Away score	Double	Points
Debrecen	2–0 (11)	2–1 (22)	0–3 (33)		4–4	6
Diósgyőr	3–1 (2)	0–1 (13)	0–0 (24)		3–2	4
Ferencváros	1–3 (21)	0–2 (10)		0–3 (32)	1–8	0
Győr	0–1 (20)	1–3 (9)		0–1 (31)	1–5	0
Kecskemét	6–1 (12)	0–0 (1)		2–2 (23)	8–3	5
MTK	1–0 (6)	2–3 (17)	1–1 (28)		4–4	4
Nyíregyháza	2–0 (16)	3–3 (5)		0–1 (27)	5–4	4
Paks	1–2 (8)	0–2 (19)	0–2 (30)		1–6	0
Puskás Akadémia	1–0 (18)	0–3 (7)		1–3 (29)	2–6	3
Újpest	0–1 (14)	1–4 (3)		2–2 (25)	3–7	1
Zalaegerszeg	1–1 (4)	1–0 (15)	0–2 (26)		2–3	4

=== Magyar Kupa ===
==== Round of 64 ====
The draw for the Round of 64 was held on 26 August 2024. In the draw Fehérvár got Monor as their opponent, who play in NB III. In the First round Monor defeated Pénzügyőr SE 1–0 at home. In the Second round Monor matched Szolnoki MÁV away and the result was 2–2, penalty shoot-out 4–3.

14 September 2024 R64	Monor (NB III)	0–2	Fehérvár	Monor
15:00 CEST	L. Horváth (yellow card) 28'	Report	Katona (yellow card) 16'; M. Kovács (yellow card) 33'; P. Kovács II 42'; B. Kovács 90'	Stadium: Balassi Bálint street stadium Attendance: 600; Referee: Tamás Takács; Assistant referees: József Aradi, Bence Belicza
Note: FEHÉRVÁR: Dala — Simut, Larsen, Spandler (c), Miličević — M. Pető (B. Kovács (substituted on) 82'), Bedi, M. Kovács (Holender (substituted on) 46'), Stefanelli (Melnyk (substituted on) 69') — P. Kovács II (Gradišar (substituted on) 61'), Katona (B. Szabó (substituted on) 61') • Manager: T. Pető

==== Round of 32 ====
The draw for the Round of 64 was held on 16 September 2024. In the draw Fehérvár got Diósgyőr as their opponent, who play also in NB I. Diósgyőr also started the Magyar Kupa competitions in Round of 64, they matched Kazincbarcika (NB II) away and the result was 4–2 after extra time.

30 October 2024 R32	Fehérvár	2–1	Diósgyőr (NB I)	Székesfehérvár
20:00 CET	Spandler (yellow card) 43'; Simut 68'; Gradišar 90+5'; Miličević (yellow card) 90+8'	Report	D. Gera (yellow card) 43'; Saničanin 45+3'	Stadium: Sóstói Stadion; Attendance: 2,338; Referee: Csaba Pintér; Assistant referees: Péter Kóbor, Georgiou Theodoros
Note: FEHÉRVÁR: Veszelinov — Babos (Simut (substituted on) 46'), A. Huszti, Serafimov, Spandler, Miličević — M. Kovács (Stefanelli (substituted on) 57'), Csongvai (c), Kalmár (Bedi (substituted on) 81'), M. Pető (Katona (substituted on) 66') — P. Kovács II (Gradišar (substituted on) 57') • Manager: T. Pető

==== Round of 16 ====
The draw for the Round of 32 was held on 31 October 2024. In the draw Fehérvár got Gyirmót FC Győr as their opponent, who play in NB II. In the Round of 64 Gyirmót matched BKV Előre (NB III) and defeated 5–1 away. In the Round of 32 Gyirmót matched ESMTK (NB III) and defeated 3–1 away after extra time.

19 February 2025 R16	Gyirmót (NB II)	0–2	Fehérvár	Gyirmót
17:00 CET	M. Katona (yellow card) 42'; Ugrai (yellow card) 76'	Report	Šaponjić 10', 45+1'; G. Nagy (yellow card) 81'	Stadium: Ménfői úti Stadion; Attendance: 738; Referee: Csaba Pintér; Assistant referees: Norbert Bornemissza, Péter Garai
Note: FEHÉRVÁR: G. Nagy — Petrov, Spandler (c), Serafimov — A. Huszti, Melnyk, Bedi, Miličević — M. Kovács (M. Pető (substituted on) 63'), Katona (Kalmár (substituted on) 80') — Šaponjić (Stefanelli (substituted on) 59') • Manager: T. Pető

==== Quarter-final ====
The draw for the quarter-finals was held on 27 February 2025. In the draw Fehérvár got MTK Budapest FC as their opponent, who play in Nemzeti Bajnokság I. In the Round of 64 MTK matched Hódmezővásárhely (NB III) and defeated 2–0 away. In the Round of 32 MTK matched Szeged (NB II) and defeated 3–0 away. In the Round of 16 MTK matched Iváncsa (NB III) and defeated 2–0 away.

3 April 2025 QF	MTK (NB I)	4–2	Fehérvár	Budapest
19:30 CEST	Németh 51'; Bognár 55'; Jurina 73'; Miličević 76' (o.g.)	Report	Šekularac 20' (yellow card) 49'; Holender (yellow card) 53'; Má. Kovács (yellow card) 54'; Petrov (yellow card) 75'; Šaponjić 89'	Stadium: Hidegkuti Nándor Stadion; Attendance: 1,600; Referee: Balázs Berke; Assistant referees: Gergő Vígh-Tarsonyi, Balázs Szert
Note: FEHÉRVÁR: G. Nagy — Spandler (c), Petrov, Kalandadze (M. Pető (substituted on) 76') — A. Huszti (Miličević (substituted on) 46'), Melnyk (Šaponjić (substituted on) 66'), Bedi, Holender — Má. Kovács, Šekularac (B. Szabó (substituted on) 66'), Stefanelli (Kastrati (substituted on) 76') • Manager: T. Pető

=== UEFA Conference League ===
==== Second qualifying round ====
25 July 2024 First leg	Sumgayit (Azerbaijan)	1–2	(Hungary) Fehérvár	Sumgait, Azerbaijan
18:00 (20:00 AMT)	Khachayev (yellow card) 8' (yellow-red card) 32'; Abdullazade 20' (yellow card) 73'; Vujnović (yellow card) 22'; Dzhenetov (yellow card) 32'; Muradov (yellow card) 67'	Report	Serafimov (yellow card) 15'; Christensen 39'; Spandler 52'; M. Pető (yellow card) 65'; Larsen (yellow card) 68'	Stadium: Mehdi Huseynzade Sumqayit City Stadium; Attendance: 9,200; Referee: Florjan Lata (Albania); Assistant referees: Xhulio Mani, Rejdi Zaimi
Note: FEHÉRVÁR: B. Tóth — Melnyk, Serafimov, Spandler, Schön — Csongvai (c), Christensen — Katona (M. Kovács (substituted on) 57'), Bedi (Larsen (substituted on) 66'), M. Pető (Babos (substituted on) 66') — Gradisar (P. Kovács II (substituted on) 84')

31 July 2024 Second leg	Fehérvár (Hungary)	0–0 (2–1 agg.)	(Azerbaijan) Sumgayit	Székesfehérvár, Hungary
19:00 CEST	Bedi (yellow card) 53'; Melnyk (yellow card) 63'	Report	S. Radović (yellow card) 45'; N. Vujnović (yellow card) 87'	Stadium: Sóstói Stadion; Attendance: 4,204; Referee: Kristoffer Karlsson (Sweden); Assistant referees: Mikael Hallin, Marcus Lundgren Klitte
Note: FEHÉRVÁR: B. Tóth — A. Huszti (Larsen (substituted on) 68'), Csongvai (c), Serafimov, Schön — Melnyk — Katona (M. Kovács (substituted on) 58'), Christensen (Ominger (substituted on) 82'), Bedi, Stefanelli (M. Pető (substituted on) 46') – P. Kovács II (Gradisar (substituted on) 46')

Fehérvár FC won 2–1 on aggregate.

==== Third qualifying round ====
8 August 2024 First leg	(Cyprus) Omonia	1–0	(Hungary) Fehérvár	Nicosia, Cyprus
19:00 (20:00 EEST)	Stępiński 60'	Report	Melnyk (yellow card) 29'; A. Huszti (yellow card) 63'	Stadium: GSP Stadium; Attendance: 15,071; Referee: Lionel Tschudi (Switzerland); Assistant referees: Matthias Sbrissa, Bastien Lengacher
Note: FEHÉRVÁR: B. Tóth — Spandler (Miličević (substituted on) 46'), Larsen, Serafimov, Melnyk — M. Kovács (M. Pető (substituted on) 46'), Bedi (A. Huszti (substituted on) 62'), Csongvai (c), Katona — Gradisar (Babos (substituted on) 76'), Christensen

14 August 2024 Second leg	Fehérvár (Hungary)	0–2 (0–3 agg.)	(Cyprus) Omonia	Székesfehérvár
18:00 CEST	Serafimov (yellow card) 73'	Report	Semedo 28' (yellow card) 28'; Kakulli 90+5'	Stadium: Sóstói Stadion; Attendance: 3,840; Referee: Jakob Kehlet (Denmark); Assistant referees: Victor Skytte, Jakob Mastrup
Note: FEHÉRVÁR: B. Tóth — Melnyk (A. Huszti (substituted on) 46'), Serafimov, Spandler, Miličević — Katona (M. Kovács (substituted on) 75'), Bedi, Csongvai (c), M. Pető (Babos (substituted on) 46') — Christensen (Stefanelli (substituted on) 57'), Holender (P. Kovács II (substituted on) 46')

AC Omonia won 3–0 on aggregate.

== Squad statistics ==
As of match played 16 March 2025

Keys
Rk.	Rank	No.	Squad number	Pos.	Position
Opponent	The opponent team without a flag is Hungarian.			(N)	The game was played at a neutral site.
(H)	Fehérvár FC were the home team.			(A)	Fehérvár FC were the away team.
Player	Young Hungarian Player, who is a Hungarian player and was born 2004 or after				
Player^{*}	Player who joined Fehérvár FC on loan during the season				
Player^{⊕}	Player who joined Fehérvár FC permanently during the season				
Player^{†}	Player who departed Fehérvár FC permanently or on loan during the season				

=== Appearances ===
Includes all competitions for senior teams.
We indicate the number of the player's appearances as substitute by the combination of a plus sign and a figure.
We indicate with gold color the maximum appearances only in the competition in which the team has already played at least 2 matches.

No.	Pos.	Nat.	Player	Date of birth (age)	Nemzeti Bajnokság I	Magyar Kupa	Conference League	Season total	Ref.
Goalkeepers
1	GK	(Hungary)	Gergely Nagy	27 May 1994 (age 32)	5	1	0	6	
44	GK	(Hungary)	Botond Kemenes^{*⊕}	11 November 2001 (age 24)	0	0	0	0	
57	GK	(Hungary)	Martin Dala	26 April 2004 (age 22)	14	1	0	15	
Defenders
3	DF	(Bulgaria)	Simeon Petrov^{*⊕}	12 January 2000 (age 26)	4	1	0	5	
4	DF	(Hungary)	Csaba Spandler (c)	7 March 1996 (age 30)	23	3	3	29	
5	DF	(Georgia (country))	Aleksandre Kalandadze^{*⊕}	9 May 2001 (age 25)	2	0	0	2	
7	DF	(Croatia)	Ivan Miličević	17 July 1998 (age 28)	11+7	3	1+1	15+8	
16	DF	(Hungary)	Mario Simut	23 September 2003 (age 23)	12+6	1+1	0	13+7	
21	DF	(Hungary)	András Huszti^{*}	29 January 2001 (age 25)	15+2	2	1+2	18+4	
31	DF	(North Macedonia)	Nikola Serafimov	11 August 1999 (age 27)	21	2	4	27	
33	DF	(Hungary)	Kristóf Lakatos	14 July 2008 (age 18)	0	0	0	0	
87	DF	(Hungary)	Milán Virágh	20 November 2007 (age 18)	0	0	0	0	
Midfielders
8	MF	(Ukraine)	Bohdan Melnyk	4 January 1997 (age 29)	17+2	1+1	4	22+3	
13	MF	(Hungary)	Zsolt Kalmár	9 June 1995 (age 31)	3+12	1+1	0	4+13	
15	MF	(Hungary)	Mátyás Kovács^{*}	7 July 2003 (age 23)	4+10	3	1+3	8+13	
18	MF	(Slovakia)	Bence Kovács	14 January 2004 (age 22)	0+1	0+1	0	0+2	
23	MF	(Hungary)	Bálint Szabó^{*}	18 January 2001 (age 25)	11+4	0+1	0	11+5	
27	MF	(Hungary)	Bence Bedi	14 November 1996 (age 29)	13+7	2+1	4	19+8	
28	MF	(Switzerland)	Kristian Šekularac^{⊕}	7 December 2003 (age 22)	0+3	0	0	0+3	
30	MF	(Hungary)	Gergő Ominger^{*}	25 September 2002 (age 24)	0+1	0	0+1	0+2	
53	MF	(Hungary)	Tamás Horváth	8 July 2007 (age 19)	0	0	0	0	
70	MF	(Hungary)	Filip Holender^{*}	27 July 1994 (age 32)	19+1	0+1	1	20+2	
77	MF	(Hungary)	Mátyás Katona	30 December 1999 (age 26)	15+8	2+1	4	21+9	
99	MF	(Hungary)	Milán Pető	25 January 2005 (age 21)	14+5	2+1	2+2	18+7	
Forwards
9	FW	(Serbia)	Ivan Šaponjić^{⊕}	2 August 1997 (age 29)	3+3	1	0	4+3	
11	FW	(Argentina)	Nicolas Stefanelli	22 November 1994 (age 31)	11+11	1+2	1+1	13+14	
19	FW	(Hungary)	Patrik Kovács	15 August 2007 (age 19)	0+8	2	1+2	3+10	
71	FW	(Hungary)	Tamás Vid Tóth	13 September 2004 (age 22)	0+1	0	0	0+1	
74	FW	(Hungary)	Bence Babos	12 February 2004 (age 22)	0+3	1	0+3	1+6	
Players who departed the club on loan but featured this season
Players who left the club during the season
(3)	DF	(Denmark)	Kasper Larsen^{†}	25 January 1993 (age 33)	2+3	1	1+2	4+5	
(6)	MF	(France)	Franck Bambock^{†}	7 April 1995 (age 31)	0	0	0	0	
(7)	MF	(Hungary)	Szabolcs Schön^{†}	27 September 2000 (age 26)	1	0	2	3	
(9)	FW	(Slovenia)	Nejc Gradišar^{†}	6 August 2002 (age 24)	17	0+2	2+1	19+3	
(10)	FW	(Kosovo)	Lirim Kastrati^{†}	16 January 1999 (age 27)	0	0	0	0	
(14)	DF	(Hungary)	Áron Csongvai^{†} (c)	31 October 2000 (age 26)	18	1	4	23	
(20)	MF	(Norway)	Tobias Christensen^{†}	11 May 2000 (age 26)	5+1	0	4	9+1	
(22)	GK	(Hungary)	Balázs Tóth^{†}	4 September 1997 (age 29)	5	0	4	9	
(23)	FW	(Hungary)	Marcell Berki^{†}	14 June 2004 (age 22)	0+2	0	0	0+2	
(75)	GK	(Hungary)	Dániel Veszelinov^{†}	5 July 2001 (age 25)	0	1	0	1	
(97)	FW	(Ukraine)	Daniel Kiwinda^{†}	31 August 2004 (age 22)	0	0	0	0	
	MF	(Hungary)	Máté Kecskés^{†}	15 May 2006 (age 20)	0	0	0	0	

Notes: GK: goalkeeper; DF: defender; MF: midfielder; FW: forward

=== Goal scorers ===
Includes all competitions for senior teams. The list is sorted by squad number when season-total goals are equal. Players with no goals not included in the list.
We indicate in parentheses how many of the goals scored by the player from penalties.

Rk.	No.	Pos.	Nat.	Player	Nemzeti Bajnokság I	Magyar Kupa	Conference League	Season total
1	(9)	FW	(Slovenia)	Nejc Gradišar^{†}	7	1	0	8
2	9	FW	(Serbia)	Ivan Šaponjić	3 (1)	2	0	5 (1)
3	23	MF	(Hungary)	Bálint Szabó^{*}	4 (2)	0	0	4 (2)
3	77	MF	(Hungary)	Mátyás Katona	4 (1)	0	0	4 (1)
4	19	FW	(Hungary)	Patrik Kovács	2	1	0	3
5	11	FW	(Argentina)	Nicolas Stefanelli	2	0	0	2
6	4	DF	(Hungary)	Csaba Spandler (c)	0	0	1	1
6	8	MF	(Ukraine)	Bohdan Melnyk	1	0	0	1
6	13	MF	(Hungary)	Zsolt Kalmár	1	0	0	1
6	(14)	DF	(Hungary)	Áron Csongvai^{†} (c)	1	0	0	1
6	16	DF	(Hungary)	Mario Simut	0	1	0	1
6	18	MF	(Slovakia)	Bence Kovács	0	1	0	1
6	(20)	MF	(Norway)	Tobias Christensen^{†}	0	0	1	1
6	31	DF	(North Macedonia)	Nikola Serafimov	1	0	0	1
6	70	MF	(Hungary)	Filip Holender^{*}	1	0	0	1
6	74	MF	(Hungary)	Bence Babos	1	0	0	1
				Opponent Own goal	2	0	0	2
Total					30 (4)	6	2	38 (4)

=== Penalties ===
Date	Penalty Taker	Scored	Opponent	Competition	Ref.
5 October 2024	(Hungary) Bálint Szabó	Yes	Győr (A)	Nemzeti Bajnokság I, Round 9	
30 October 2024	(Slovenia) Nejc Gradišar	No	Diósgyőr (H)	Magyar Kupa, Round of 32	
8 December 2024	(Hungary) Mátyás Katona	Yes	Nyíregyháza (H)	Nemzeti Bajnokság I, Round 16	
23 February 2025	(Hungary) Bálint Szabó	Yes	Ferencváros (H)	Nemzeti Bajnokság I, Round 21	
7 March 2025	(Serbia) Ivan Šaponjić	Yes	Kecskemét (A)	Nemzeti Bajnokság I, Round 23	

=== Assists ===
Includes all competitions for senior teams. The list is sorted by squad number when season-total assists are equal. Players with no assists not included in the list.

Rk.	No.	Pos.	Nat.	Player	Nemzeti Bajnokság I	Magyar Kupa	Conference League	Season total
1	(9)	FW	(Slovenia)	Nejc Gradišar^{†}	2	2	0	4
2	(14)	DF	(Hungary)	Áron Csongvai^{†} (c)	3	0	0	3
3	7	DF	(Croatia)	Ivan Miličević	2	0	0	2
3	11	FW	(Argentina)	Nicolas Stefanelli	2	0	0	2
3	16	DF	(Hungary)	Mario Simut	1	1	0	2
3	23	MF	(Hungary)	Bálint Szabó^{*}	2	0	0	2
3	70	MF	(Hungary)	Filip Holender^{*}	2	0	0	2
3	77	MF	(Hungary)	Mátyás Katona	1	0	1	2
4	3	DF	(Bulgaria)	Simeon Petrov	0	1	0	1
4	8	MF	(Ukraine)	Bohdan Melnyk	1	0	0	1
4	(20)	MF	(Norway)	Tobias Christensen^{†}	1	0	0	1
4	27	MF	(Hungary)	Bence Bedi	0	0	1	1
Total					17	4	2	23

=== Goalkeepers ===
==== Clean sheets ====
Includes all competitions for senior teams. The list is sorted by squad number when season-total clean sheets are equal. Numbers in parentheses represent games where both goalkeepers participated and both kept a clean sheet; the number in parentheses is awarded to the goalkeeper who was substituted on, whilst a full clean sheet is awarded to the goalkeeper who was on the field at the start of play.

Goalkeeper							Clean sheets			
Rk.	No.	Nat.	Goalkeeper	Games Played	Goals Against	Goals Against Average	Nemzeti Bajnokság I	Magyar Kupa	Conference League	Season total
1	57	(Hungary)	Martin Dala	15	18 (2)	1.20	4	1	0	5
2	1	(Hungary)	Gergely Nagy	6	7 (1)	1.17	2	1	0	3
3	(22)	(Hungary)	Balázs Tóth^{†}	9	13	1.44	1	0	1	2
4	(75)	(Hungary)	Dániel Veszelinov^{†}	1	1	1.00	0	0	0	0
Total					39 (3)		7	2	1	10

==== Penalties saving ====
Date	Goalkeeper	Penalty Kick Save	Penalty Taker	Opponent	Competition	Min.
29 September 2024	(Hungary) Martin Dala	No	(Hungary) Bence Ötvös	Paks (H)	Nemzeti Bajnokság I, Round 8	(penalty scored) '75
20 October 2024	(Hungary) Martin Dala	No	(Brazil) Kady	Ferencváros (A)	Nemzeti Bajnokság I, Round 10	(penalty scored) '56
1 December 2024	(Hungary) Gergely Nagy	Yes	(France) Yohan Croizet	Zalaegerszeg (A)	Nemzeti Bajnokság I, Round 15	(penalty missed) '78
14 December 2024	(Hungary) Gergely Nagy	No	(Hungary) Rajmund Molnár	MTK (A)	Nemzeti Bajnokság I, Round 17	(penalty scored) '90+6

=== Disciplinary record ===
Includes all competitions for senior teams. The list is sorted by red cards, then yellow cards (and by squad number when total cards are equal). Players with no cards not included in the list.

Rk.	No.	Pos.	Nat.	Player	Nemzeti Bajnokság I				Magyar Kupa				Conference League				Season total			
Rk.	No.	Pos.	Nat.	Player	Yellow card	Second yellow card	Red card	MM	Yellow card	Second yellow card	Red card	MM	Yellow card	Second yellow card	Red card	MM	Yellow card	Second yellow card	Red card	MM
1	21	DF	(Hungary)	András Huszti^{*}	6	0	1	2	0	0	0	0	1	0	0	0	7	0	1	2
2	31	DF	(North Macedonia)	Nikola Serafimov	4	1	0	1	0	0	0	0	2	0	0	0	6	1	0	1
3	(3)	DF	(Denmark)	Kasper Larsen^{†}	0	1	0	1	0	0	0	0	1	0	0	0	1	1	0	1
4	23	MF	(Hungary)	Bálint Szabó^{*}	0	1	0	1	0	0	0	0	0	0	0	0	0	1	0	1
5	4	DF	(Hungary)	Csaba Spandler (c)	5	0	0	1	1	0	0	0	0	0	0	0	6	0	0	1
5	16	DF	(Hungary)	Mario Simut	6	0	0	1	0	0	0	0	0	0	0	0	6	0	0	1
6	(14)	DF	(Hungary)	Áron Csongvai^{†} (c)	5	0	0	1	0	0	0	0	0	0	0	0	5	0	0	1
7	8	MF	(Ukraine)	Bohdan Melnyk	2	0	0	0	0	0	0	0	2	0	0	0	4	0	0	0
7	27	MF	(Hungary)	Bence Bedi	3	0	0	0	0	0	0	0	1	0	0	0	4	0	0	0
7	70	MF	(Hungary)	Filip Holender^{*}	4	0	0	0	0	0	0	0	0	0	0	0	4	0	0	0
8	7	DF	(Croatia)	Ivan Miličević	2	0	0	0	1	0	0	0	0	0	0	0	3	0	0	0
8	9	FW	(Serbia)	Ivan Šaponjić^{⊕}	3	0	0	0	0	0	0	0	0	0	0	0	3	0	0	0
8	(9)	FW	(Slovenia)	Nejc Gradišar^{†}	3	0	0	0	0	0	0	0	0	0	0	0	3	0	0	0
8	99	MF	(Hungary)	Milán Pető	2	0	0	0	0	0	0	0	1	0	0	0	3	0	0	0
9	13	MF	(Hungary)	Zsolt Kalmár	2	0	0	0	0	0	0	0	0	0	0	0	2	0	0	0
9	15	MF	(Hungary)	Mátyás Kovács^{*}	1	0	0	0	1	0	0	0	0	0	0	0	2	0	0	0
9	77	MF	(Hungary)	Mátyás Katona	1	0	0	0	1	0	0	0	0	0	0	0	2	0	0	0
10	1	GK	(Hungary)	Gergely Nagy	1	0	0	0	0	0	0	0	0	0	0	0	1	0	0	0
10	(7)	MF	(Hungary)	Szabolcs Schön^{†}	1	0	0	0	0	0	0	0	0	0	0	0	1	0	0	0
10	19	FW	(Hungary)	Patrik Kovács	1	0	0	0	0	0	0	0	0	0	0	0	1	0	0	0
10	(20)	MF	(Norway)	Tobias Christensen^{†}	1	0	0	0	0	0	0	0	0	0	0	0	1	0	0	0
Total					53	3	1	8	4	0	0	0	8	0	0	0	65	3	1	8

=== Suspensions ===
Player	Date Received	Opponent	Competition	Length of suspension			
(Hungary) András Huszti	28 July 2024	(red card) 86' vs Kecskemét (A)	NB I, Round 1	1 Match	Diósgyőr (H)	NB I, Round 2	3 August 2024
(Denmark) Kasper Larsen	29 September 2024	(yellow card) 18' (yellow-red card) 78' vs Paks (H)	NB I, Round 8	1 Match	Győri (A)	NB I, Round 9	5 October 2024
(Hungary) Áron Csongvai	1 February 2025	5th (yellow card) after Puskás Akadémia (H)	NB I, Round 18	1 Match	Paks (A)	NB I, Round 19	8 February 2025
(Hungary) András Huszti	14 February 2025	5th (yellow card) after Győr (H)	NB I, Round 20	1 Match	Ferencváros (H)	NB I, Round 21	23 February 2025
(North Macedonia) Nikola Serafimov	23 February 2025	(yellow card) 57' (yellow-red card) 74' vs Ferencváros (H)	NB I, Round 21	1 Match	Debrecen (A)	NB I, Round 22	2 March 2025
(Hungary) Mario Simut	23 February 2025	5th (yellow card) vs Ferencváros (H)	NB I, Round 21	1 Match	Debrecen (A)	NB I, Round 22	2 March 2025
(Hungary) Báint Szabó	7 March 2025	(yellow card) 73' (yellow-red card) 76' vs Kecskemét (A)	NB I, Round 22	1 Match	Diósgyőr (H)	NB I, Round 23	16 March 2025
(Hungary) Csaba Spandler	16 March 2025	5th (yellow card) after Diósgyőr (H)	NB I, Round 24	1 Match	Újpest (A)	NB I, Round 25	30 March 2025
(Kosovo) Lirim Kastrati	24 May 2025	(red card) 70' vs Debrecen (H)	NB I, Round 33	2 Matches	TBD (First 2 matches of the 2025–26 season)		

=== Injuries ===
Player	Date	Offence	Competition	Ref.
(Kosovo) Lirim Kastrati	11 July 2024	vs Hebar Pazardzhik (Bulgaria) (A)	Friendly	
(Hungary) Gergő Ominger^{*}	31 July 2024	vs Sumgayit (Azerbaijan) (H)	Conference League, Second qualifying round	
(Hungary) Bence Babos	14 August 2024	vs Omonia (Cyprus) (H)	Conference League, Third qualifying round	
(Ukraine) Bohdan Melnyk	29 September 2024	(substituted off) 35' vs Paks (H)	Nemzeti Bajnokság I, Round 8	

=== Captains ===
Includes all competitions for senior teams. The list is sorted by squad number when season-total number of games where a player started as captain are equal. Players with no games started as captain not included in the list.

Rk.	No.	Pos.	Nat.	Player	Nemzeti Bajnokság I	Magyar Kupa	Conference League	Season total
1	(14)	DF	(Hungary)	Áron Csongvai^{†}	18	1	4	23
2	4	DF	(Hungary)	Csaba Spandler	13	2	0	15
3	13	MF	(Hungary)	Zsolt Kalmár	1	0	0	1
3	57	GK	(Hungary)	Martin Dala	1	0	0	1
Total					33	3	4	40

=== Summary statistics ===
Half season (Round 1 to 17) statistics.

==== Most playing minutes ====
	1st					2nd					3rd				
	No.	Pos.	Nat.	Player	Minutes	No.	Pos.	Nat.	Player	Minutes	No.	Pos.	Nat.	Player	Minutes
Half season	14	DF	(Hungary)	Áron Csongvai	1,530	4	DF	(Hungary)	Csaba Spandler	1,528	31	DF	(North Macedonia)	Nikola Serafimov	1,502
Full season	TBD					TBD					TBD				

==== Expected goals (xG) ====
	1st					2nd					3rd				
	No.	Pos.	Nat.	Player	xG	No.	Pos.	Nat.	Player	xG	No.	Pos.	Nat.	Player	
Half season	9	FW	(Slovenia)	Nejc Gradišar	4.34	77	MF	(Hungary)	Mátyás Katona	2.96	11	FW	(Argentina)	Nicolas Stefanelli	2.58
Full season	TBD					TBD					TBD				

==== Attempts on target ====
	1st					2nd					3rd				
	No.	Pos.	Nat.	Player	Attempts	No.	Pos.	Nat.	Player	Attempts	No.	Pos.	Nat.	Player	Attempts
Half season	9	FW	(Slovenia)	Nejc Gradišar	17 of 30	11	FW	(Argentina)	Nicolas Stefanelli	8 of 26	77	MF	(Hungary)	Mátyás Katona	8 of 24
Full season	TBD					TBD					TBD				

==== Passing accuracy ====
	1st					2nd					3rd				
	No.	Pos.	Nat.	Player	Passing accuracy (%)	No.	Pos.	Nat.	Player	Passing accuracy (%)	No.	Pos.	Nat.	Player	Passing accuracy (%)
Half season	31	DF	(North Macedonia)	Nikola Serafimov	90.3%	4	DF	(Hungary)	Csaba Spandler	84.8%	13	MF	(Hungary)	Zsolt Kalmár	82.2%
Full season	TBD					TBD					TBD				

==== Balls recovered ====
	1st					2nd					3rd				
	No.	Pos.	Nat.	Player	Balls recovered	No.	Pos.	Nat.	Player	Balls recovered	No.	Pos.	Nat.	Player	Balls recovered
Half season	14	DF	(Hungary)	Áron Csongvai	79	4	DF	(Hungary)	Csaba Spandler	70	31	DF	(North Macedonia)	Nikola Serafimov	65
Full season	TBD					TBD					TBD				

== Attendances ==
The table contains the number of attendances of Fehérvár FC domestic matches.
Clicking on the competitions leads to the number of spectators for all the matches of the competitions.
The gold indicates the highest attendances, and the lowest attendances with pink .
Home stadium: Sóstói Stadion, Székesfehérvár • Capacity: 14,201

League	Matches	Attendances	Average		High		Low	
League	Matches	Attendances	Att.	%	Att.	%	Att.	%
Nemzeti Bajnokság I	16	52,359	3,272	23.0%	9,160	64.5%	2,175	15.3%
Magyar Kupa	1	2,338	2,338	16.4%	2,338	16.4%	2,338	16.4%
UEFA Conference League	2	8,044	4,022	28.3%	4,204	29.6%	3,840	27.0%
Total	19	62,741	3,302	23.2%	9,160	64.5%	2,175	15.3%

Nemzeti Bajnokság I
Round	Date	Opponent	Attendances	%	Ref.
Round 2	3 August 2024	Diósgyőr	3,063	21.6%	
Round 4	18 August 2024	Zalaegerszeg	2,760	19.5%	
Round 6	30 August 2024	MTK Budapest	3,014	21.2%	
Round 8	29 September 2024	Paks	3,079	21.7%	
Round 11	26 October 2024	Debrecen	3,418	24.0%	
Round 12	3 November 2024	Kecskemét	2,683	18.9%	
Round 14	23 November 2024	Újpest	3,505	24.7%	
Round 16	8 December 2024	Nyíregyháza	2,175	15.3%	
Round 18	1 February 2025	Puskás Akadémia	2,315	16.3%	
Round 20	14 February 2025	Győr	2,583	18.2%	
Round 21	23 February 2025	Ferencváros	4,229	29.8%	
Round 24	16 March 2025	Diósgyőr	2,794	19.7%	
Round 26	6 April 2025	Zalaegerszeg	2,193	15.4%	
Round 28	6 April 2025	MTK Budapest	2,521	17.7%	
Round 30	4 May 2025	Paks	2,867	20.2%	
Round 33	24 May 2025	Debrecen	9,160	64.5%	
Total			52,359	—	
Average			3,272	23.0%	

Magyar Kupa
Round	Date	Opponent	Attendances	%	Ref.
Round of 32	30 October 2024	Diósgyőr	2,338	16.4%	
Total			2,338	—	
Average			2,338	16.4%	

UEFA Conference League
Round	Date	Opponent	Attendances	%	Ref.
Second qualifying round	31 July 2024	(Azerbaijan) Sumgayit	4,204	29.6%	
Third qualifying round	14 August 2024	(Cyprus) Omonia	3,840	27.0%	
Total			8,044	—	
Average			4,022	28.3%	

== Awards and nominations ==
Keys
M	Matches	W	Won	D	Drawn	L	Lost
Pts	Points	GF	Goals for	GA	Goals against	GD	Goal difference
Pos.	Position	Pld	Played	G	Goals	A	Assists
(H)	Fehérvár FC were the home team.			(A)	Fehérvár FC were the away team.		
Player	Young Hungarian Player, who is a Hungarian player and was born 2004 or after						
Player^{*}	Player who joined Fehérvár FC permanently or on loan during the season						
Player^{†}	Player who departed Fehérvár FC permanently or on loan during the season						

=== Weekly awards ===
==== Player of the Round ====
Selection of the Round of Nemzeti Bajnokság by Nemzeti Sport, M4 Sport TV, Csakfoci and Sofascore websites, Player of the Week (POW) by Nemzeti Sport and The Best Goal of the Round (BGR) by MLSZ (Hungarian Football Federation).

R.	Opponent	Pos.	Player	Selection of the Round				POW	BGR	Ref.
R.	Opponent	Pos.	Player	Nemzeti Sport	M4 Sport TV	Csakfoci	Sofascore	POW	BGR	Ref.
R1	Kecskemét (A)	GK	(Hungary) Balázs Tóth				Yes			
R2	Diósgyőr (H)	DF	(North Macedonia) Nikola Serafimov			Yes				
R2	Diósgyőr (H)	MF	(Norway) Tobias Christensen^{†}			Yes				
R4	Zalaegerszeg (H)	DF	(North Macedonia) Nikola Serafimov				Yes			
R6	MTK (H)	GK	(Hungary) Martin Dala		Yes					
R8	Paks (H)	GK	(Hungary) Martin Dala			Yes				
R11	Debrecen (H)	DF	(Hungary) Áron Csongvai^{†} (c)			Yes				
R11	Debrecen (H)	FW	(Slovenia) Nejc Gradišar^{†}			Yes	Yes			
R12	Kecskemét (H)	DF	(Hungary) Áron Csongvai^{†} (c)		Yes					
R12	Kecskemét (H)	FW	(Argentina) Nicolas Stefanelli		Yes	Yes	Yes			
R12	Kecskemét (H)	FW	(Slovenia) Nejc Gradišar^{†}		Yes	Yes	Yes			
R12	Kecskemét (H)	MF	(Hungary) Zsolt Kalmár (s)			Yes				
R15	Zalaegerszeg (A)	GK	(Hungary) Gergely Nagy				Yes			
R15	Zalaegerszeg (A)	DF	(North Macedonia) Nikola Serafimov				Yes			
R15	Zalaegerszeg (A)	MF	(Ukraine) Bohdan Melnyk			Yes				
R15	Zalaegerszeg (A)	MF	(Hungary) Filip Holender				Yes			
R16	Nyíregyháza (H)	GK	(Hungary) Gergely Nagy			Yes				
R16	Nyíregyháza (H)	MF	(Hungary) Bálint Szabó			Yes				
R16	Nyíregyháza (H)	FW	(Slovenia) Nejc Gradišar^{†}		Yes		Yes			
R18	Puskás Akadémia (H)	DF	(Hungary) Nikola Serafimov			Yes				
R18	Puskás Akadémia (H)	MF	(Hungary) Mátyás Katona		Yes	Yes	Yes			
R18	Puskás Akadémia (H)	FW	(Hungary) Nicolas Stefanelli			Yes				
R21	Ferencváros (H)	GK	(Hungary) Gergely Nagy		Yes		Yes			
R22	Debrecen (A)	GK	(Hungary) Martin Dala		Yes		Yes			
R22	Debrecen (A)	DF	(Bulgaria) Simeon Petrov			Yes				
R23	Kecskemét (A)	FW	(Serbia) Ivan Šaponjić		Yes	Yes	Yes		Yes	

(s) Substitute

==== Goal of the Round ====
Goal of the Round of Nemzeti Bajnokság by the M4 Sport website.

Keys

- Score – The score at the time of the goal. Fehérvár FC's score listed first.
- Final score – The score at full time; Fehérvár FC's listed first.

Round	Pos.	Player	Placement	Score	Final score	Opponent	Date	Ref.

=== Yearly awards ===
==== HLSZ Cup ====
Award	Manager or Player	Result	Ref.
2024 Best Goalkeeper of the Year	(Hungary) Balázs Tóth	Nominated	

==== Márton Fülöp Award by HLSZ ====
Award	Manager or Player	Result	Ref.
2024 The Most Beautiful Goalkeeper Saving of the Year	(Hungary) Balázs Tóth	Won	

==== Best U21 Players Worldwide ====
This report presents the players from 65 leagues born in 2004 or later who performed the best during the ongoing season or the one just completed for leagues organised over the calendar year. The rankings were established according to a performance index on a 100-basis considering players' activity in six areas of the game: ground defence, aerial play, distribution, chance creation, take on and finishing. Goalkeepers and centre forwards were divided into two categories, centre backs int three, full/wing backs and wingers into four, and midfielders into five. Scouting report by CIES Football Observatory.

Category	#	Player	Score
Long-passes Goalkeepers	7th	(Hungary) Martin Dala	54.5

== Milestones ==
Keys
Final score	The score at full time; Fehérvár FC's listed first.	No.	Squad number	Pos.	Position
Opponent	The opponent team without a flag is Hungarian.	(N)	The game was played at a neutral site.		
(H)	Fehérvár FC were the home team.	(A)	Fehérvár FC were the away team.		
Player^{*}	Player who joined Fehérvár FC permanently or on loan during the season				
Player^{†}	Player who departed Fehérvár FC permanently or on loan during the season				

Debuts

The following players made their competitive debuts for Fehérvár FC's first team during the campaign.

Date	No.	Pos.	Player	Age	Final score	Opponent	Competition	Ref.
25 July 2024	8	MF	(Ukraine) Bohdan Melnyk	27	2–1	Sumgayit (A)	Conference League, QR 2.1	
25 July 2024	15	MF	(Hungary) Mátyás Kovács^{*}	21	2–1	Sumgayit (A)	Conference League, QR 2.1	
25 July 2024	27	MF	(Hungary) Bence Bedi	27	2–1	Sumgayit (A)	Conference League, QR 2.1	
28 July 2024	21	DF	(Hungary) András Huszti^{*}	23	0–0	Kecskemét (A)	Nemzeti Bajnokság I, Round 1	
28 July 2024	30	MF	(Hungary) Gergő Ominger^{*}	21	0–0	Kecskemét (A)	Nemzeti Bajnokság I, Round 1	
8 August 2024	7	DF	(Croatia) Ivan Miličević	26	0–1	Omonia (A)	Conference League, QR 3.1	
14 August 2024	70	MF	(Hungary) Filip Holender^{*}	30	0–2	Omonia (H)	Conference League, QR 3.2	
30 August 2024	57	GK	(Hungary) Martin Dala	20	1–0	MTK (H)	Nemzeti Bajnokság I, Round 6	
14 September 2024	18	MF	(Slovakia) Bence Kovács	20	2–0	Monor (A)	Magyar Kupa, Round of 64	
8 February 2025	9	FW	(Serbia) Ivan Šaponjić	27	0–2	Paks (A)	Nemzeti Bajnokság I, Round 19	
14 February 2025	5	DF	(Georgia (country)) Aleksandre Kalandadze^{*}	23	0–1	Győr (H)	Nemzeti Bajnokság I, Round 20	
14 February 2025	28	MF	(Switzerland) Kristian Šekularac	21	0–1	Győr (H)	Nemzeti Bajnokság I, Round 20	
19 February 2025	3	DF	(Bulgaria) Simeon Petrov^{*}	25	2–0	Gyirmót (A)	Magyar Kupa, Round of 16	

50th appearances

The following players made their 50th appearances for Fehérvár FC's first team during the campaign.

Date	No.	Pos.	Player	Age	Final score	Opponent	Competition	Ref.

First goals

The following players scored their first goals for Fehérvár FC's first team during the campaign.

Keys

- Score – The score at the time of the goal. Fehérvár FC's score listed first.
- Final score – The score at full time; Fehérvár FC's listed first.

Date	No.	Pos.	Player	Age	Score	Final score	Opponent	Competition	Ref.
25 July 2024	4	DF	(Hungary) Csaba Spandler	28	2–1	2–1	Sumgayit (A)	Conference League, QR 2.1	
