= Milán Pető =

Hungarian footballer (born 2005)

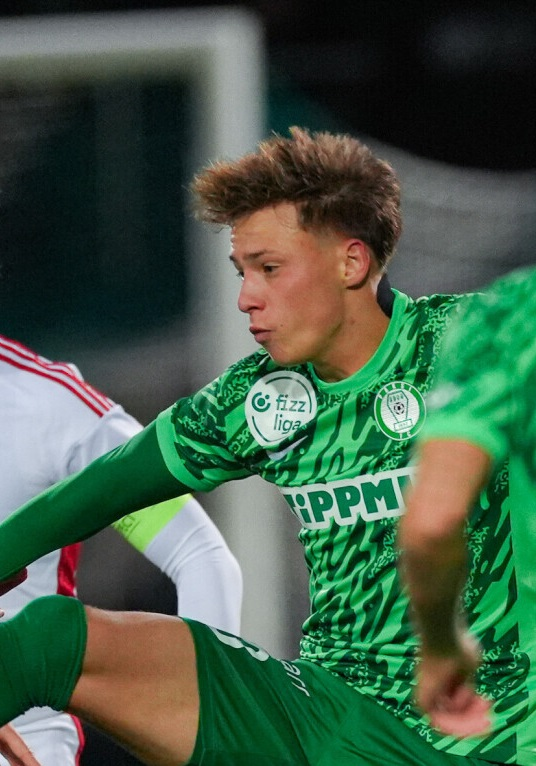
- Pető playing for Paks in 2025

Personal information
- Date of birth: 25 January 2005 (age 21)
- Place of birth: Breda, Netherlands
- Height: 1.75 m (5 ft 9 in)
- Position: Midfielder

Team information
- Current team: Diósgyőr (on loan from Paks)
- Number: 23

Youth career
- 2012–2017: Veszprém
- 2017–2022: Fehérvár

Senior career*
Years	Team	Apps	(Gls)
2022–2025	Fehérvár II	39	(1)
2022–2025	Fehérvár	45	(1)
2025–	Paks	14	(1)
2026	→ Diósgyőr (loan)	13	(2)

International career^{‡}
2026–	Hungary	2	(0)
- * Club domestic league appearances and goals as of 30 May 2026 ‡ National team caps and goals as of 18 November 2026

Milán Pető (born 25 January 2005) is a Hungarian professional footballer, who plays as a midfielder for Nemzeti Bajnokság I club Diósgyőr, on loan from Paks and the Hungary national team.

== Career ==
On 26 June 2025, Pető signed a four-year contract with Nemzeti Bajnokság I side Paks.

== Personal life ==
He is the son of football manager and former international player Tamás Pető. They worked together at Fehérvár in the 2024–25 season. He was born in the Netherlands while his father was playing in the country.

== Career statistics ==
As of match played 14 August 2025

Appearances and goals by club, season and competition
Club	Season	League			National cup (Note: Includes Magyar Kupa)		Europe		Total	
Club	Season	Division	Apps	Goals	Apps	Goals	Apps	Goals	Apps	Goals
Fehérvár II	2021–22	Nemzeti Bajnokság III	2	0	—		—		2	0
Fehérvár II	2022–23	Nemzeti Bajnokság III	28	0	—		—		28	0
Fehérvár II	2023–24	Nemzeti Bajnokság III	9	1	—		—		9	1
Fehérvár II	Total		39	1	—		—		39	1
Fehérvár	2022–23	Nemzeti Bajnokság I	1	0	—		—		1	0
Fehérvár	2023–24	Nemzeti Bajnokság I	18	1	—		—		18	1
Fehérvár	2024–25	Nemzeti Bajnokság I	26	0	4	0	4 (Note: Appearance(s) in UEFA Conference League)	0	34	0
Fehérvár	Total		45	1	4	0	4	0	53	1
Paks	2025–26	Nemzeti Bajnokság I	2	1	0	0	1	0	3	1
Career total			86	3	4	0	5	0	95	3

=== International ===
As of match played 17 November 2026

Appearances and goals by national team and year
National team	Year	Apps	Goals
Hungary	2026	2	0
Total		2	0
