= Patrik Kovács (footballer, born 2007) =

Hungarian footballer

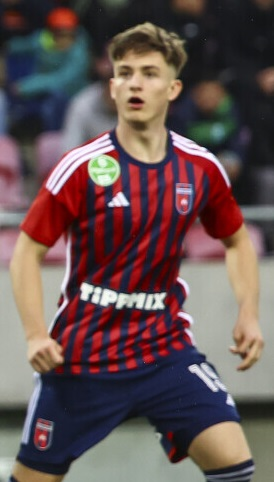
- Kovács playing for Fehérvár in 2024

Personal information
- Full name: Patrik Márk Kovács
- Date of birth: 15 August 2007 (age 19)
- Place of birth: Budapest, Hungary
- Position: Forward

Team information
- Current team: Mezőkövesdi SE on loan from Videoton
- Number: 9

Youth career
- 2013–2023: Vasas
- 2024: Fehérvár

Senior career*
Years	Team	Apps	(Gls)
2023–2024	Vasas II	7	(0)
2024–	Videoton	22	(4)
2024	Fehérvár II	9	(2)
2026–	→ Mezőkövesdi (loan)	6	(3)

International career
2023–2024	Hungary U17	7	(4)
2024–	Hungary U18	2	(0)
- * Club domestic league appearances and goals as of 3 October 2026

Patrik Márk Kovács (born 15 August 2007) is a Hungarian professional footballer who plays as a forward for Nemzeti Bajnokság II side Mezőkövesdi SE on loan from Videoton. He is a Hungary youth international.

== Club career ==
He joined Fehérvár in 2024 from the reserves side at Vasas SC for whom he appeared in Nemzeti Bajnokság III. He made his Nemzeti Bajnokság I debut for Fehérvár on 3 February 2024 against Zalaegerszeg. He went on to make four substitute appearances during the 2023–24 season for Fehérvár, and was the youngest player to feature during the 2023–24 Hungarian top flight league season.

He scored his first league goal for Fehérvár against Újpest on 11 August 2024 at the age of 16 years old, a record for the team. Later that month, he made his debut in the UEFA Conference League against Omonia Nicosia.

== International career ==
In August 2024, he made his debut for the Hungary national under-18 football team in a 5–0 win over North Macedonia U18.

== Personal life ==
He is the son of Hungarian former international footballer Zoltán Kovács.

== Career statistics ==
As of match played 12 February 2026

Appearances and goals by club, season and competition
Club	Season	League			Magyar Kupa		Europe		Total	
Club	Season	Division	Apps	Goals	Apps	Goals	Apps	Goals	Apps	Goals
Vasas II	2023–24	Nemzeti Bajnokság III	7	0	—		—		7	0
Videoton	2023–24	Nemzeti Bajnokság I	4	0	—		—		4	0
Videoton	2024–25	Nemzeti Bajnokság I	8	2	2	1	3 (Note: Appearances in UEFA Conference League)	0	13	3
Videoton	2025–26	Nemzeti Bajnokság II	6	0	1	0	—		7	0
Videoton	Total		18	2	3	1	3	0	24	3
Fehérvár II	2023–24	Nemzeti Bajnokság III	9	2	—		—		9	2
Career total			34	4	3	1	3	0	40	5
