= Ivan Miličević (footballer, born 1998) =

Professional footballer

Personal information
- Date of birth: 16 July 1998 (age 28)
- Place of birth: Split, Croatia
- Position: Left back

Team information
- Current team: AC Horsens
- Number: 7

Youth career
- Posušje
- Široki Brijeg

Senior career*
Years	Team	Apps	(Gls)
2017–2018	Široki Brijeg	6	(0)
2018	→ Dugopolje (loan)	14	(0)
2018–2024	Lokomotiva Zagreb	77	(2)
2019–2020	→ Varaždin (loan)	20	(0)
2020	→ Dubrava (loan)	2	(0)
2020–2021	→ Željezničar (loan)	21	(2)
2024	Kifisia	15	(1)
2024–2025	Fehérvár	27	(0)
2025–	AC Horsens	30	(3)

International career
2016–2017	Bosnia and Herzegovina U19	12	(0)
2021	Bosnia and Herzegovina U21	3	(0)
- * Club domestic league appearances and goals as of 20:29, 27 July 2026 (UTC)

Ivan Miličević (born 16 July 1998) is a professional footballer who plays as a left back for Danish Superliga club AC Horsens. Born in Croatia, he holds Croatian and Bosnian citizenship and has represented Bosnia and Herzegovina at under-19 and under-21 level.

Miličević began his career at Posušje and made his senior debut in the Premier League of Bosnia and Herzegovina with Široki Brijeg. He joined Lokomotiva Zagreb in 2018 and spent the following three years on loan at Varaždin, Dubrava and Željezničar, winning the Croatian Second Football League with Varaždin in the 2018–19 season. He returned to Lokomotiva in 2021 and became a regular in the Croatian Football League.

Miličević moved abroad in January 2024, first to Kifisia in Greece and then to Fehérvár in Hungary, playing in the UEFA Conference League qualifying rounds. He signed for AC Horsens in June 2025 and helped the club win promotion to the Superliga in the 2025–26 season.

== Early life and youth career ==
Miličević was born in Split on 16 July 1998. He began playing football at Posušje in Bosnia and Herzegovina. He then moved to Široki Brijeg, where he developed as a player and signed his first professional contract.

== Club career ==
=== Široki Brijeg and Dugopolje ===
Miličević made his senior debut for Široki Brijeg in the Premier League of Bosnia and Herzegovina. After a year in the first team he was dissatisfied with his playing time and joined Croatian second-tier club Dugopolje on loan in early 2018. He was a regular starter during his half-season there. Široki Brijeg manager Goran Sablić brought him back into the squad at the end of the season, but Miličević accepted an offer from Lokomotiva Zagreb instead.

=== Lokomotiva Zagreb ===
Miličević signed for Lokomotiva in 2018. He was not an immediate starter and spent the following seasons on loan. He joined Varaždin, where he was described as one of the key players in the club's 2018–19 Croatian Second Football League title win and promotion. In January 2020 Varaždin manager Luka Bonačić told him he was no longer in his plans, and he moved on loan to second-division club Dubrava Tim Kabel for the remainder of the season. He spent the 2020–21 season on loan at Željezničar in Bosnia and Herzegovina.

Miličević returned to Lokomotiva in the summer of 2021 and established himself in the first team. In October 2021, he was dubbed one of the biggest surprises of the 2021–22 season and he was reported to be the highest-rated left back in the division. On 20 October 2021, he scored in a 2–1 away win over Rijeka, driving down the left flank and aiming a cross that looped over the goalkeeper and in off the far post. Index.hr compared the goal to Robert Prosinečki's strike against Jamaica at the 1998 FIFA World Cup. By the time he left, Miličević had made 82 appearances for Lokomotiva over two and a half years, scoring twice and providing 14 assists.

=== Kifisia ===
Kifisia announced the signing of Miličević on 7 January 2024 on a contract until 2025. He joined a side managed by David Nielsen and had made 15 appearances for Lokomotiva in the first half of that season. Miličević made nine appearances in the Super League Greece and scored once. Kifisia were relegated at the end of the 2023–24 season and he left the club.

=== Fehérvár ===
On 7 August 2024, Miličević signed with Fehérvár as a free agent. He made his European debut the following day in the third qualifying round of the 2024–25 UEFA Conference League, coming on at half-time for Csaba Spandler in a 1–0 defeat away to Omonia. He started the second leg on 14 August, a 2–0 home defeat that eliminated Fehérvár 3–0 on aggregate.

Miličević made 27 league appearances in the 2024–25 season under managers Tamás Pető and Krisztián Tímár, and provided five assists. Fehérvár were relegated to the Nemzeti Bajnokság II, and the club confirmed in June 2025 that Miličević would leave on the expiry of his contract.

=== AC Horsens ===
AC Horsens announced the signing of Miličević on a free transfer on 24 June 2025, on a two-year contract running to the summer of 2027. The move reunited him with David Nielsen, who had managed him at Kifisia. Sporting director Esben Hansen said the club had followed Miličević for several years and described him as an important addition because of his experience, his dynamism and his crossing. He became a regular at left wing-back in the 2025–26 Danish 1st Division and set up the only goal of a 1–0 home win over Esbjerg fB in September 2025.

In November 2025, Miličević was left out of the squad for a league match against Kolding IF. Tipsbladet reported that the omission was an internal punishment imposed after a series of training-ground incidents in which he had made racist and age-related remarks towards three team-mates of African origin and had spat at one of them, and that he had apologised to the squad before accepting the sanction. Nielsen confirmed that an incident had taken place in training which required action from him, said that it had been handled internally, and declined to comment further. Miličević did not comment. The club's head of communications, Frank Hove, said that nothing had happened at AC Horsens that had not happened at other clubs. Tipsbladet columnist Farzam Abolhosseini criticised the club's handling of the matter and said that Miličević should have left the club. Miličević returned to the squad later the same month.

Miličević scored in both meetings with Hvidovre IF during the promotion group play-offs. On 25 April 2026, he equalised in the 84th minute of a 1–1 away draw, scoring directly from a corner in strong wind. On 16 May 2026, he equalised again in the 88th minute of a 1–1 home draw against the same opponents. AC Horsens finished second in the division and secured promotion to the Danish Superliga with a 1–0 win over Kolding IF on the final matchday, returning to the top flight after three seasons.

== International career ==
Miličević has represented Bosnia and Herzegovina at youth level. He made five appearances for the under-19 team and three for the under-21 team.

== Honours ==
Varaždin

- Croatian Second Football League: 2018–19

AC Horsens

- Danish 1st Division runner-up: 2025–26
