= Martin Dala =

Hungarian footballer (born 2004)

Personal information
- Date of birth: 26 April 2004 (age 22)
- Place of birth: Székesfehérvár, Hungary
- Position: Goalkeeper

Team information
- Current team: Puskás Akadémia
- Number: 57

Youth career
- 2009–2014: Főnix-Gold
- 2014–2022: Fehérvár

Senior career*
Years	Team	Apps	(Gls)
2020–2025	Fehérvár II	75	(0)
2021–2025	Fehérvár	21	(0)
2021–2022	→ Budaörs (loan)	3	(0)
2023–2024	→ Nyíregyháza (loan)	17	(0)
2025–	Puskás Akadémia	1	(0)
2026–	→ Nyíregyháza (loan)	3	(0)
- * Club domestic league appearances and goals as of 30 May 2026

Martin Dala (born 26 April 2004) is a Hungarian professional footballer, who plays as a goalkeeper for Nemzeti Bajnokság I club Nyíregyháza, on loan from Puskás Akadémia.

== Career ==
Dala spent the 2021–22 season at Nemzeti Bajnokság II side Budaörs.

On 27 June 2025, he joined Nemzeti Bajnokság I club Puskás Akadémia by signing a contract until 2029. The club needed a goalkeeper, as Ármin Pécsi continued his career at Liverpool.

== Career statistics ==
As of match played 10 August 2025

Appearances and goals by club, season and competition
Club	Season	League			National cup (Note: Includes Magyar Kupa)		Europe		Total	
Club	Season	Division	Apps	Goals	Apps	Goals	Apps	Goals	Apps	Goals
Fehérvár II	2020–21	Nemzeti Bajnokság III	24	0	—		—		24	0
Fehérvár II	2021–22	Nemzeti Bajnokság III	23	0	—		—		23	0
Fehérvár II	2022–23	Nemzeti Bajnokság III	28	0	—		—		28	0
Fehérvár II	Total		75	0	—		—		75	0
Fehérvár	2021–22	Nemzeti Bajnokság I	0	0	0	0	0	0	0	0
Fehérvár	2022–23	Nemzeti Bajnokság I	0	0	0	0	0	0	0	0
Fehérvár	2024–25	Nemzeti Bajnokság I	21	0	1	0	0	0	22	0
Fehérvár	Total		21	0	1	0	0	0	22	0
Budaörs (loan)	2021–22	Nemzeti Bajnokság II	3	0	—		—		3	0
Nyíregyháza (loan)	2023–24	Nemzeti Bajnokság II	17	0	0	0	—		17	0
Puskás Akadémia	2025–26	Nemzeti Bajnokság I	1	0	0	0	0	0	1	0
Career total			117	0	1	0	0	0	118	0

== Honours ==
Nyíregyháza

- Nemzeti Bajnokság II: 2023–24
