= Simeon Petrov =

Bulgarian footballer (born 2000)

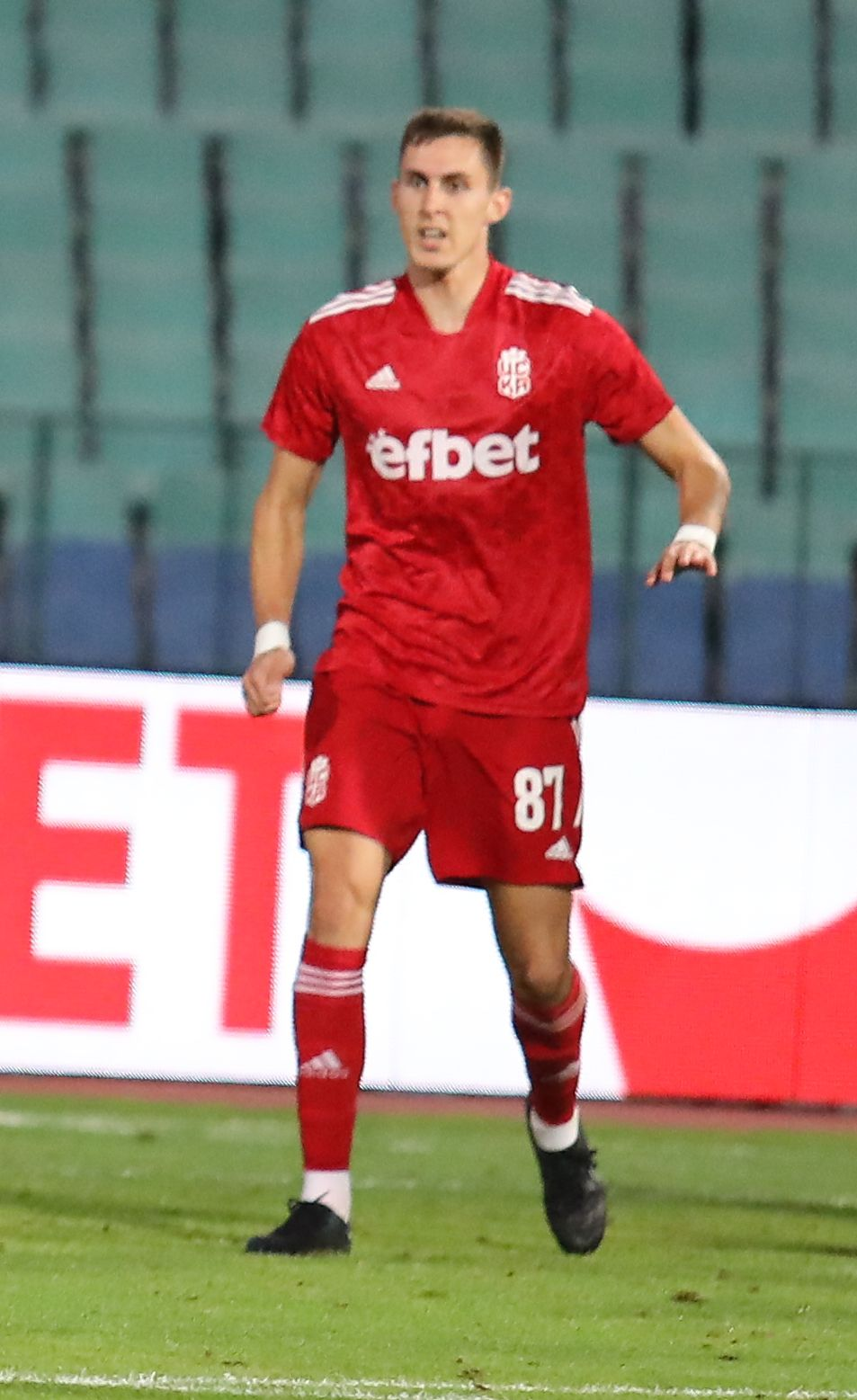
- Petrov with CSKA 1948 in 2021

Personal information
- Full name: Simeon Petrov
- Date of birth: 12 January 2000 (age 26)
- Place of birth: Limoges, France
- Height: 1.92 m (6 ft 4 in)
- Position: Centre-back

Team information
- Current team: Botev Plovdiv
- Number: 87

Youth career
- 2006–2018: Limoges
- 2018–2019: Gazélec Ajaccio

Senior career*
Years	Team	Apps	(Gls)
2017–2018	Limoges	1	(0)
2018–2019	Gazélec Ajaccio	0	(0)
2019–2020	Strumska Slava	13	(2)
2020–2024	CSKA 1948	71	(3)
2021–2023	CSKA 1948 II	12	(1)
2024	→ Śląsk Wrocław (loan)	12	(1)
2024–2025	Śląsk Wrocław	14	(2)
2025	→ Fehérvár (loan)	13	(0)
2025–	Botev Plovdiv	26	(1)

International career^{‡}
2020–2022	Bulgaria U21	14	(1)
2023–	Bulgaria	12	(0)
- * Club domestic league appearances and goals as of 06:08, 6 October 2026 (UTC) ‡ National team caps and goals as of 22:56, 10 June 2025 (UTC)

Simeon Petrov (Bulgarian: Симеон Петров; born 12 January 2000) is a professional footballer who plays as a centre-back for Botev Plovdiv.

== Club career ==
Born in Limoges, France, in a family of Bulgarian emigrants, Petrov started his football career in the local academy of Limoges. In 2018 he joined Gazélec Ajaccio, before moving to Bulgaria in 2019 and joining the second-level side Strumska Slava. On 24 May 2020, he joined the newly promoted First League club CSKA 1948.

On 21 December 2023, it was announced Petrov would join Polish Ekstraklasa side Śląsk Wrocław on a six-month loan, with a purchase option, starting from 1 January 2024. After the conclusion of the 2023–24 season, during which Petrov made 12 appearances and scored once, Śląsk exercised their option to sign him permanently on a four-year deal. On 14 February 2025, he was sent on loan to Hungarian side Fehérvár for the rest of the season, with an option to buy. On 1 July 2025, Petrov joined Fehérvár on a permanent basis, for a fee estimated to be €150,000.

== International career ==
Petrov was born in France to Bulgarian parents, which made him eligible for both France and Bulgaria national teams. He received his first call up for the Bulgaria U21 team in November 2020 for the 2021 European Under-21 Championship qualifying match against Estonia U21, but was recalled two days before the match due to a positive COVID-19 test. On 20 June 2023, Petrov earned his first senior team cap after coming on as a late substitute for Georgi Rusev in a 1–1 draw with Serbia in a Euro 2024 qualifier.

== Career statistics ==
=== Club ===
As of match played 24 May 2025

Appearances and goals by club, season and competition
Club	Season	League			National cup (Note: Includes Bulgarian Cup, Polish Cup, Magyar Kupa)		Europe		Other		Total	
Club	Season	Division	Apps	Goals	Apps	Goals	Apps	Goals	Apps	Goals	Apps	Goals
Limoges	2017–18	National 3	1	0	0	0	—		—		1	0
Gazélec Ajaccio	2018–19	Ligue 2	0	0	0	0	—		—		0	0
Strumska Slava	2019–20	Second League	13	2	0	0	—		—		13	2
CSKA 1948	2020–21	First League	18	0	1	0	—		—		19	0
CSKA 1948	2021–22	First League	24	3	1	0	—		—		25	3
CSKA 1948	2022–23	First League	19	0	6	0	—		—		25	0
CSKA 1948	2023–24	First League	10	0	1	0	2 (Note: Appearances in UEFA Conference League)	0	–		13	0
CSKA 1948	Total		71	3	9	0	2	0	—		82	3
CSKA 1948 II	2021–22	Second League	2	0	—		—		—		2	0
CSKA 1948 II	2022–23	Second League	8	1	—		—		—		8	1
CSKA 1948 II	2023–24	Second League	2	0	—		—		—		2	0
CSKA 1948 II	Total		12	1	—		—		—		12	1
Śląsk Wrocław (loan)	2023–24	Ekstraklasa	12	1	—		—		—		12	1
Śląsk Wrocław	2024–25	Ekstraklasa	14	2	1	0	4	1	—		19	3
Śląsk Wrocław	Total		26	3	1	0	4	1	—		31	4
Fehérvár (loan)	2024–25	Nemzeti Bajnokság I	13	0	2	0	—		—		15	0
Career total			136	9	12	0	6	1	—		154	10

=== International ===
As of match played 10 June 2025

Appearances and goals by national team and year
National team	Year	Apps	Goals
Bulgaria	2024	3	0
Bulgaria	2024	6	0
Bulgaria	2025	3	0
Total		12	0
