= Kristian Šekularac =

Swiss footballer (born 2003)

Personal information
- Full name: Kristian Anthony Šekularac
- Date of birth: 7 December 2003 (age 22)
- Place of birth: London, England
- Height: 1.88 m (6 ft 2 in)
- Position: Midfielder

Team information
- Current team: FK Železničar Pančevo
- Number: 77

Youth career
- –2020: Servette
- 2020–2022: Juventus
- 2022–2025: Fulham

Senior career*
Years	Team	Apps	(Gls)
2025	Fehérvár	7	(0)
2026–	Železničar Pančevo	10	(1)

International career
2018	Switzerland U16		
2021	Switzerland U18		
2024	Switzerland U21		
- * Club domestic league appearances and goals as of 26 May 2026

Kristian Anthony Šekularac (born 7 December 2003) is a Swiss professional footballer who plays as a midfielder for FK Železničar Pančevo. He is the great-nephew of Dragoslav Šekularac.

== Club career ==
Šekularac was a youth player in Switzerland at Servette, before joining Juventus in Italy in January 2020. This move had family significance because five decades earlier, Juventus owner Gianni Agnelli had tried to sign his great-uncle Dragoslav Šekularac from Crvena Zvezda, but the move was blocked by the Yugoslav state. Kristian played for Juventus U23 in the 2021–22 season.

=== Fulham ===
In July 2022, Šekularac joined Fulham in England. In November, he was involved in the Fulham first team and was named in the match day squad for the Premier League match against Manchester United on 13 November.

=== Fehérvár ===
On 7 February 2025, Šekularac joined Fehérvár in Nemzeti Bajnokság, Hungary.

== International career ==
Šekularac played for the Swiss U16 international team from July 2018. In 2021 he was called up to the Swiss U18 team. He played for the Switzerland U21 side against Albania U21 in March 2024.

== Personal life ==
Born in London, he has a Swiss passport and is eligible to play internationally for North Macedonia or Serbia. He is the grandson of footballer Mirko Šekularac, the younger brother of Serbian footballer and famed football coach Dragoslav Šekularac.
