= Nicholas Stefanelli =

American chef

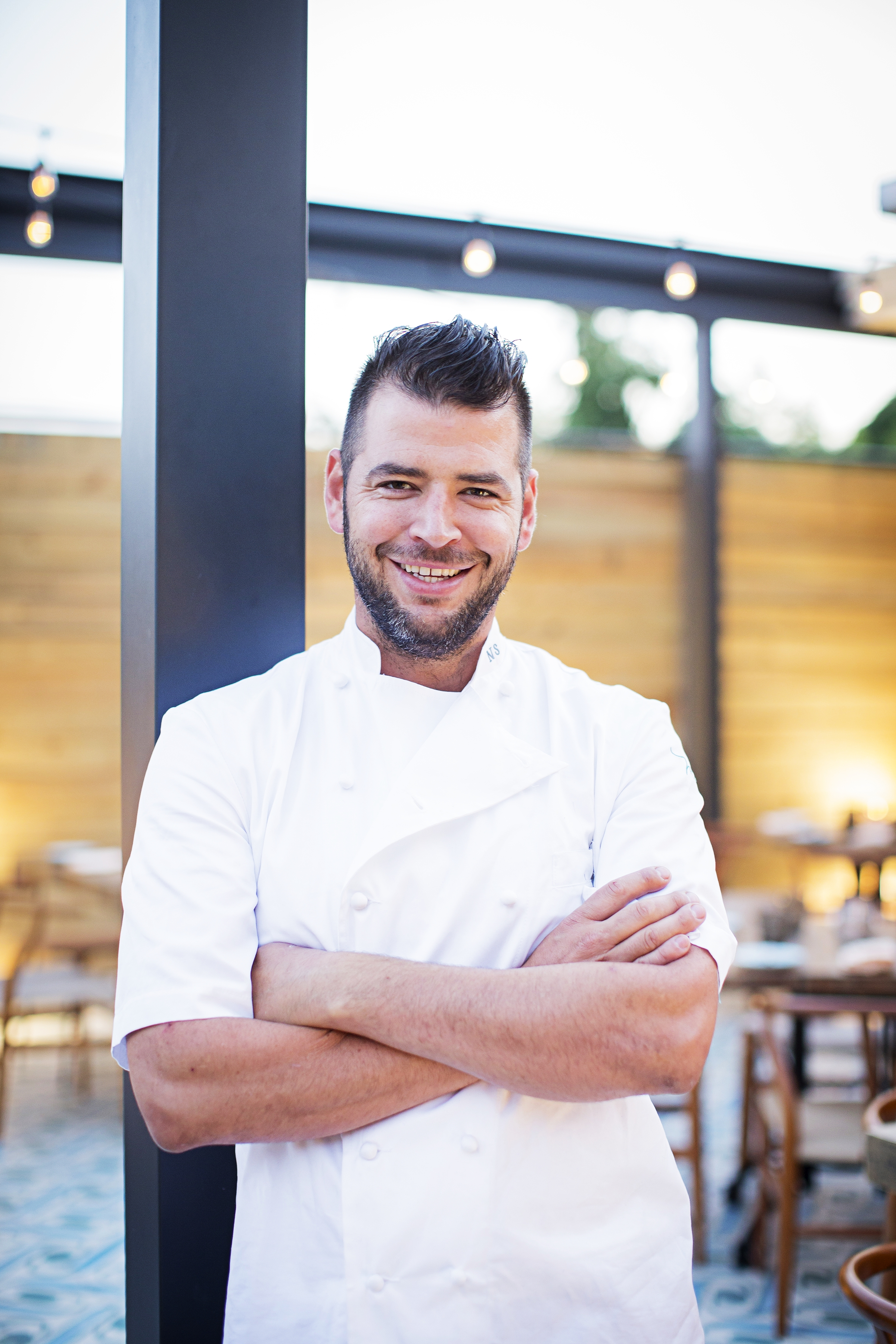
- Born: Maryland
- Education: DeMatha Hyattsville, Maryland; L’academic de Cuisine, Gaithersburg, Maryland
- Culinary career
- Cooking style: Italian
- Rating: Michelin Star
- Current restaurants: Masseria; Officina; Le Clou
- Previous restaurants: Bibiana (2009-2014); Fiamma (2007-2009); Maestro (2003-2007); Laboratorio del Galileo (2001-2003)
- Website: masseria-dc.com

Nicholas Stefanelli is an American chef and restaurateur in Washington, D.C., known for his Michelin-starred Italian restaurant Masseria.

== Early life ==
Born in Maryland, Stefanelli is of Greek and Italian descent, with family from the Apulia region of southern Italy. He was an aspiring baseball player at DeMatha Catholic High School in Washington, D.C., until he broke his foot. After high school, he went to Italy to pursue a career in fashion in Milan, but he became interested in the food he encountered in Rome, Florence, Assisi, and Venice. After realizing his passion for cooking, he enrolled in L’Academie de Cuisine in Gaithersburg, Maryland and joined the kitchen of Roberto Donna at Italian restaurant Galileo in Washington, D.C. He then went to work for Fabio Trabocchi at Maestro in Tysons Corner, Virginia, following Trabocchi to Fiamma in New York City. After Fiamma closed in 2009, Stefanelli worked a stage at The French Laundry in California.

In 2009, Stefanelli was recruited by restaurateur Ashok Bajaj to return to D.C. to develop a menu and lead the kitchen at a new Italian restaurant, Bibiana Osteria-Enoteca. Bibiana received many positive reviews upon opening, and it was recognized as one of the best new restaurants in America by Esquire magazine. Stefanelli won the title of "Rising Culinary Star" at the 2010 Restaurant Association of Metropolitan Washington (Rammy) Awards.

== Masseria and Officina ==
In 2014, Stefanelli left Bibiana to open his own restaurant, called Masseria. Named for the agricultural estates in Italy's Apulia region, Masseria opened in August 2015 and was Union Market's first standalone restaurant. In October 2016, Masseria earned a Michelin Star within the city's first-ever guide. In 2018, Masseria won the Rammy Award for Formal Fine Dining Restaurant of the Year.

In October 2018, Stefanelli opened Officina, a three-floor Italian trattoria, café, and market located in The Wharf, a new development on Washington's Southwest Waterfront. In November 2018, Stefanelli announced plans to open a Greek restaurant in downtown Washington, D.C.

== Awards ==
- 2010 Restaurant Association of Metropolitan Washington (RAMMY), Rising Culinary Star.
- 2017 Michelin Star (Masseria), the Michelin Guide.
- 2018 Restaurant Association of Metropolitan Washington (RAMMY), Formal Fine Dining Restaurant of the Year (Masseria).
