= Marcell Berki =

Hungarian footballer

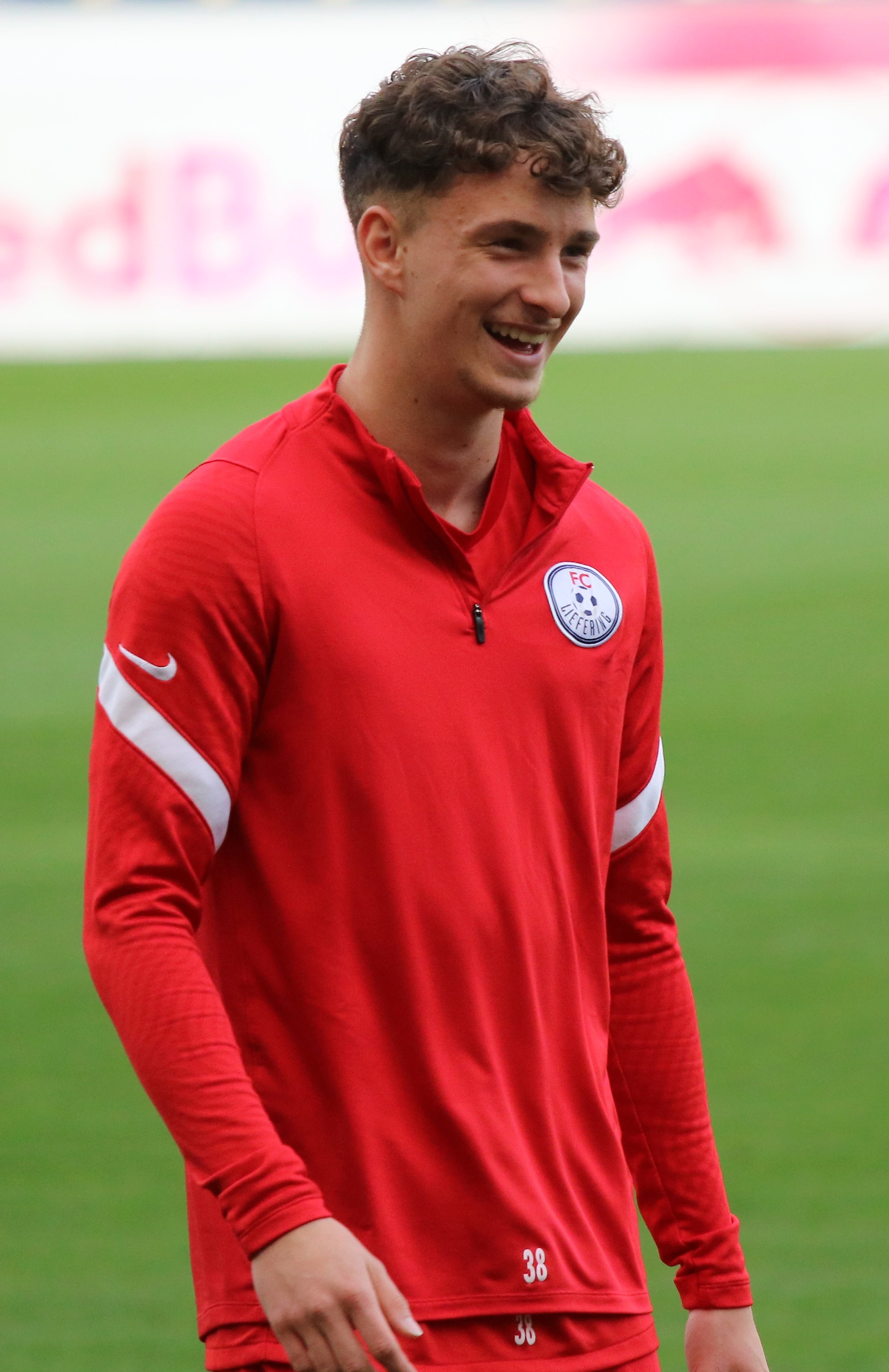

Personal information
- Full name: Marcell Tibor Berki
- Date of birth: 14 June 2004 (age 22)
- Height: 1.80 m (5 ft 11 in)
- Position: Forward

Team information
- Current team: Kecskemét
- Number: 17

Youth career
- 2010–2018: Fehérvár
- 2018–2022: Red Bull Salzburg

Senior career*
Years	Team	Apps	(Gls)
2022–2023	FC Liefering	13	(1)
2023–2024	Fehérvár	15	(1)
2024–	Kecskemét	27	(1)

International career^{‡}
2019	Hungary U16	2	(0)
2022	Hungary U18	2	(0)
2022–	Hungary U19	4	(2)
- * Club domestic league appearances and goals as of 31 May 2026 ‡ National team caps and goals as of 2 November 2022

Marcell Tibor Berki (born 14 June 2004) is a Hungarian professional footballer who plays as a forward for OTP Bank Liga club Kecskemét.

== Club career ==
Berki started his career with Fehérvár, then known as Videoton, in 2010, spending eight years with the Székesfehérvár-based club. He joined Austrian team Red Bull Salzburg in 2018, and signed his first professional contract in July 2022.

On 11 July 2023, Berki signed a contract with Fehérvár. The club he represented for 8 years in his youth.

== International career ==
Berki has represented Hungary at youth international level.

== Career statistics ==
=== Club ===
As of 2 November 2022.

Club	Season	League			Cup		Other		Total	
Club	Season	Division	Apps	Goals	Apps	Goals	Apps	Goals	Apps	Goals
FC Liefering	2021–22	2. Liga	6	1	–		0	0	6	1
FC Liefering	2022–23	2. Liga	5	0	–		0	0	5	0
Career total			11	1	0	0	0	0	11	1
