= Dániel Veszelinov =

Hungarian footballer

Personal information
- Date of birth: 5 July 2001 (age 25)
- Place of birth: Szeged, Hungary
- Height: 1.85 m (6 ft 1 in)
- Position: Goalkeeper

Team information
- Current team: Szeged-Csanád
- Number: 99

Youth career
- 2018–2020: Király SZE

Senior career*
Years	Team	Apps	(Gls)
2020–2024	DAC Dunajská Streda	16	(0)
2020–2024	→ ŠTK Šamorín	27	(0)
2024–2025	Fehérvár	0	(0)
2025–	Szeged-Csanád	42	(0)

International career^{‡}
2022–	Hungary U21	2	(0)
- * Club domestic league appearances and goals as of 31 May 2026 ‡ National team caps and goals as of 15:55, 3 Jan 2024 (UTC)

Dániel Veszelinov (born 5 July 2001) is a Hungarian professional footballer who plays as a goalkeeper for Szeged-Csanád.

== Club career ==
=== DAC Dunajská Streda ===
DAC signed Veszelinov as a prospective and talented player in early December 2020 from Király SZE on a two-year contract.
