= Tamás Pető =

Hungarian football player and manager (born 1974)

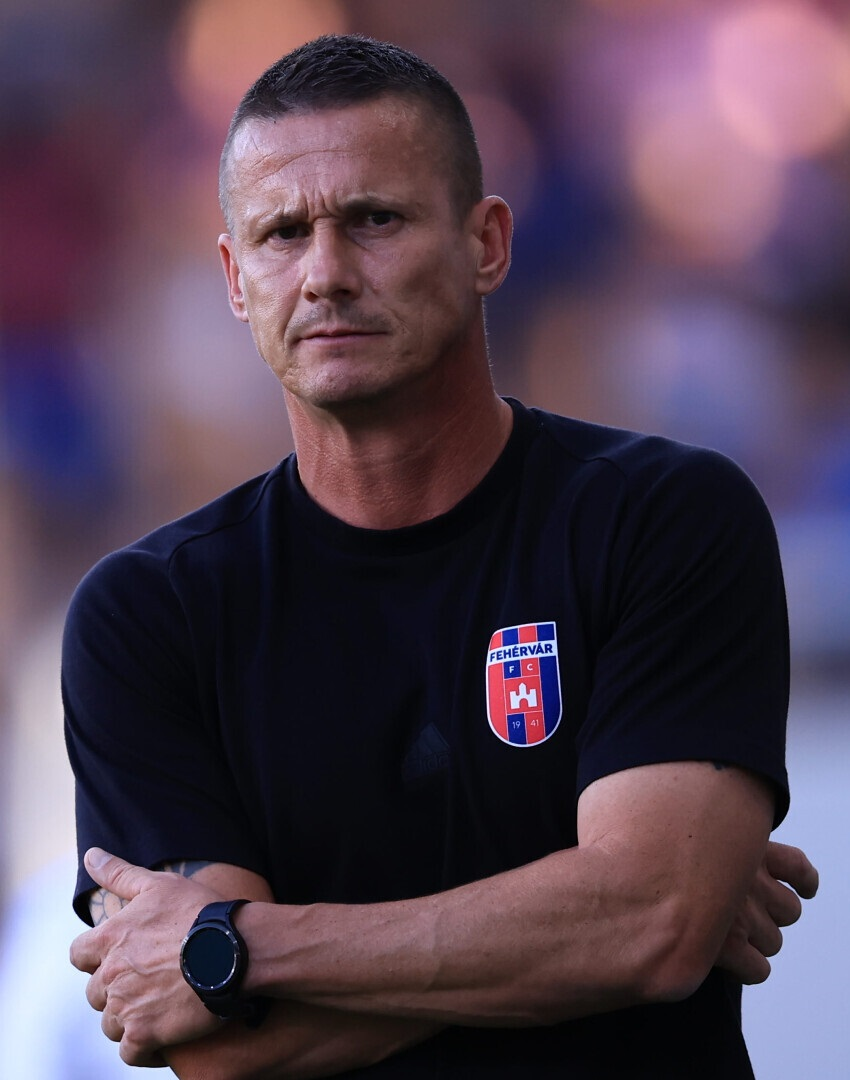
- Pető managing Fehérvár in 2024

Personal information
- Date of birth: 8 June 1974 (age 52)
- Place of birth: Ajka, Hungary
- Position: Midfielder

Senior career*
Years	Team	Apps	(Gls)
1992–1994	FC Veszprém	39	(8)
1994–1996	Győri ETO FC	20	(1)
1996–1997	Videoton FC	33	(3)
1997–2000	Újpest FC	71	(9)
2000	Verbroedering Geel	2	(0)
2000–2001	Vasas SC	28	(7)
2001–2007	NAC Breda	83	(5)
2007–2008	Újpest FC	3	(0)
2008	Lombard-Pápa TFC	3	(0)

International career
1998–2002	Hungary	14	(0)

Managerial career
- 2008–2009: Veszprém
- 2009: Balatonfüred (youth)
- 2010–2014: Balatonfüred
- 2015–2017: Videoton FC (assistant)
- 2015: Videoton FC (caretaker)
- 2018: Paks (assistant)
- 2018–2024: Veszprém
- 2024–2025: Fehérvár
- 2025–2026: Videoton
- * Club domestic league appearances and goals

Tamás Pető (born 8 June 1974) is a Hungarian football manager and former player and manager.

== Playing career ==
Pető is a midfielder who was born in Ajka and made his debut in professional football, being part of the FC Veszprém squad in the 1992–93 season. He also played for Győri ETO FC, Videoton FC Fehérvár, Újpest FC and Vasas SC before joining NAC Breda.

== Managerial career ==
Pető was appointed as the caretaker manager of the Nemzeti Bajnokság I club, Videoton FC after the dismissal of Bernard Casoni.

In an interview with former Videoton manager, Bernard Casoni, Pető was criticized due to his inexperience.

On 15 June 2024, he was appointed as the manager of Fehérvár FC.

On 12 November 2025, Pető was appointed manager of the Székesfehérvár-based club Videoton in the Nemzeti Bajnokság II for the third time, signing a contract valid until the end of the 2025–26 season.

== Managerial statistics ==
As of 28 August 2015

Team	Nat	From	To	Record							
Team	Nat	From	To	P	W	D	L	GF	GA	GD	Win %
Videoton ^{1}	Hungary	19 August 2015		8	3	0	5	0	7	−7	37.5
Total				0	0	0	0	0	0	+0	—

Notes

- Note 1: as caretaker manager
