= 2025–26 Al Ahly SC season =

Al Ahly
2025–26 season
- Chairman: Mahmoud El Khatib
- Manager: José Riveiro (until 31 August); Emad El Nahhas (caretaker, 1 September–8 October); Jess Thorup (from 8 October)
- Stadium: Cairo International Stadium
- Egyptian Premier League: 3rd
- Egypt Cup: Round of 32
- Egyptian League Cup: Group stage
- Egyptian Super Cup: Winners
- CAF Champions League: Quarter-finals
- Top goalscorer: League: Trézéguet (11); All: Trézéguet (18)
| Home colours | Away colours | Third colours |
- All statistics correct as of 21 August 2026.

The 2025–26 season was the 119th season in Al Ahly's history and the 67th consecutive season in the Premier League. In addition to the domestic league, Al Ahly competed in the Egyptian Cup, the Egyptian League Cup, the CAF Champions League the Egyptian Super Cup

== Kit information ==
Supplier: Adidas
Main sponsor: e&, ORA (friendlies only), FABMISR bank
Sleeve sponsor: GLC Paints, Al Marasem Development
Back sponsor: Shell Helix, Lipton

| Home | Away |

== Players ==
=== First-team squad ===
| No. | Pos. | Nat. | Player | Date of birth (age) | Since | Notes |
Goalkeepers
| 1 | GK | (Egypt) | Mohamed El Shenawy (C) | 18 December 1988 (age 37) | 2016 | |
| 26 | GK | (Egypt) | Mohamed Seha | 1 May 2001 (age 25) | 2025 | |
| 31 | GK | (Egypt) | Mostafa Shobier | 17 March 2000 (age 26) | 2019 | |
Defenders
| 2 | CB | (Egypt) | Yassin Marei | 7 November 2001 (age 25) | 2025 | |
| 3 | RB | (Egypt) | Omar Kamal | 29 September 1993 (age 33) | 2024 | |
| 4 | CB | (Egypt) | Ahmed Ramadan Beckham | 23 March 1997 (age 29) | 2025 | on loan from Ceramica Cleopatra |
| 6 | CB | (Egypt) | Yasser Ibrahim | 10 February 1993 (age 33) | 2019 | |
| 12 | LB | (Egypt) | Mohamed Shokry | 6 July 1999 (age 27) | 2025 | |
| 15 | CB | (Morocco) | Achraf Dari | 6 May 1999 (age 27) | 2024 | |
| 20 | CB | (Egypt) | Mostafa El Aash | 11 October 2000 (age 26) | 2025 | |
| 30 | RB | (Egypt) | Mohamed Hany (TC) | 25 January 1996 (age 30) | 2014 | |
| 40 | CB | (Egypt) | Ahmed Abdin | 1 May 2006 (age 20) | 2024 | |
Midfielders
| 5 | DM | (Tunisia) | Ben Romdhane | 6 September 1999 (age 27) | 2025 | |
| 8 | CM | (Egypt) | Ahmed Reda Hashem | 19 December 2000 (age 25) | 2025 | |
| 13 | DM | (Egypt) | Marwan Attia | 12 August 1998 (age 28) | 2023 | |
| 19 | AM | (Egypt) | Afsha | 6 March 1996 (age 30) | 2019 | |
| 22 | CM | (Egypt) | Emam Ashour | 20 February 1998 (age 28) | 2023 | |
| 23 | DM | (Mali) | Aliou Dieng | 16 October 1997 (age 29) | 2019 | |
| 36 | DM | (Egypt) | Ahmed Koka | 4 July 2001 (age 25) | 2020 | |
Forwards
| 7 | LW | (Egypt) | Trezeguet (VC) | 1 October 1994 (age 32) | 2025 | |
| 9 | CF | (Slovenia) | Nejc Gradišar | 6 August 2002 (age 24) | 2025 | |
| 10 | ST | (Egypt) | Mohamed Sherif | 4 February 1996 (age 30) | 2025 | |
| 11 | LW | (Egypt) | Ahmed Abdel Kader | 23 May 1999 (age 27) | 2020 | |
| 14 | LW | (Egypt) | Hussein El Shahat | 21 June 1992 (age 34) | 2019 | |
| 17 | LW | (Morocco) | Achraf Bencharki | 24 September 1994 (age 32) | 2025 | |
| 25 | RW | (Egypt) | Ahmed Sayed | 10 January 1996 (age 30) | 2025 | |
| 28 | RW | (Egypt) | Karim Fouad | 1 October 1999 (age 27) | 2021 | |
| 29 | CF | (Egypt) | Taher Mohamed | 7 March 1997 (age 29) | 2020 | |
| 38 | RW | (Egypt) | Mohamed Abdallah | 18 October 2005 (age 21) | 2023 | |
| 39 | ST | (Egypt) | Hamza Abdelkarim | 1 January 2008 (age 18) | 2020 | From the Youth Academy |

=== Out on loan ===
| Pos | Player | To | End date |
|---|---|---|---|
| FW | (Morocco) Reda Slim | (Morocco) AS FAR | End of the season |
| FW | (Tunisia) Cristo | (Tunisia) ES Sahel | End of the season |
| FW | (Egypt) Samir Mohamed | (Egypt) Petrojet | End of the season |
| MF | (Egypt) Omar El Saaiy | (Egypt) Al Masry | End of the season |
| MF | (Egypt) Kabaka | (Egypt) ZED | End of the season |
| MF | (Egypt) Ahmed Wahid | (Egypt) Ghazl El Mahalla | End of the season |
| MF | (Egypt) Youssef Affify | (Egypt) Al Mokawloon Al Arab | End of the season |
| DF | (Egypt) Karim El Debes | (Egypt) Cleopatra | End of the season |
| DF | (Egypt) Abdelrahman Rashdan | (Egypt) Modern Sport | End of the season |
| DF | (Egypt) Youssef Abdelhafiz | (Egypt) Pharco | End of the season |
| DF | (Egypt) Moataz Mohamed | (Egypt) Haras El Hodoud | End of the season |
| GK | (Egypt) Mostafa Makhlouf | (Egypt) Modern Sport | End of the season |

== Transfers ==
=== In ===
| Pos. | Player | From | Fee | Date | Source |
|---|---|---|---|---|---|
| GK | (Egypt) Mohamed Seha | (Egypt) Al Mokawloon Al Arab | 440K $ | 1 June 2025 | |
| MF | (Egypt) Hamdy Fathy | (Qatar) Al Wakrah | loan transfer | 1 June 2025 | |
| MF | (Tunisia) Mohamed Ali Ben Romdhane | (Hungary) Ferencvaros | 1.8M $ | 1 June 2025 | |
| MF | (Mali) Aliou Dieng | (Saudi Arabia) Al Kholood | End of loan | 1 June 2025 | |
| FW | (Egypt) Trezeguet | (Turkey) Trabzonspor | 1.6M $ | 1 June 2025 | |
| DF | (Egypt) Ahmed Ramadan Beckham | (Egypt) Ceramica Cleopatra | Loan transfer | 5 June 2025 | |
| FW | (Egypt) Ahmed Sayed Zizo | (Egypt) Zamalek | Free Transfer | 6 June 2025 | |
| FW | (Egypt) Mohamed Yasser | (Czech Republic) FK Teplice | End of loan | 30 June 2025 | |
| FW | (Egypt) Ahmed Abdelkader | Qatar SC | End of loan | 30 June 2025 | |
| FW | (Tunisia) Mohamed Dhaoui | (Tunisia) CS Sfaxien | End of loan | 30 June 2025 | |
| MF | (Egypt) Kabaka | (Egypt) Modern Sport | End of loan | 30 June 2025 | |
| DF | (Egypt) Ahmed Abdin | (Egypt) Ceramica Cleopatra | End of loan | 30 June 2025 | |
| DF | (Egypt) Abdallah Bostangy | (Egypt) Smouha | End of loan | 30 June 2025 | |
| DF | (Egypt) Yassin Marei | (Egypt) Pharco | Undisclosed | 14 July 2025 | |

=== Out ===
| Pos. | Player | To | Fee | Date | Source |
|---|---|---|---|---|---|
| DF | (Egypt) Rami Rabia | (United Arab Emirates) Al Ain FC | End of contract | 1 June 2025 | |
| DF | (Tunisia) Ali Maaloul | (Tunisia) CS Sfaxien | End of contract | 1 June 2025 | |
| MF | (Egypt) Akram Tawfik | (Qatar) Al-Shamal SC | End of contract | 1 June 2025 | |
| MF | (Egypt) Amr El Solia | (Egypt) Ceramica Cleopatra FC | End of contract | 1 June 2025 | |
| GK | (Egypt) Hamza Alaa | (Portugal) Portimonense S.C. | End of contract | 1 June 2025 | |
| DF | (Egypt) Abdallah Bostangy | (Egypt) ZED FC | Undisclosed | 18 July 2025 | |
| DF | (Egypt) Khaled Abdelfattah | (Egypt) Ceramica Cleopatra FC | Undisclosed | 12 July 2025 | |
| MF | (Egypt) Karim Walid | (Egypt) Ceramica Cleopatra FC | Undisclosed | 20 July 2025 | |
| FW | (Palestine) Wessam Abou Ali | (United States) Columbus Crew | €6.40m | 26 July 2025 | |
| MF | (Egypt) Mostafa El Badry | (Egypt) Petrojet | Undisclosed | 4 August 2025 | |
| FW | (Egypt) Mohamed Yasser | (Czech Republic) SK Sigma Olomouc | €150K | 2 September 2025 | |

== Pre-season and friendlies ==
| 21 July 2025 Friendly | Stade Tunisien (Tunisia) | 1–4 | Al Ahly | Tabarka, Tunisia |

| 25 July 2025 Friendly | CA Bizertin (Tunisia) | 0–5 | Al Ahly | Tabarka, Tunisia |

| 29 July 2025 Friendly | Al Ahly | 2–0 | ENPPI | Cairo |
| 19:00 | Afsha; Trézéguet | | | Stadium: Mokhtar El Tetsh Stadium |

| 3 August 2025 Friendly | Al Ahly | 1–0 | Egypt U20 | Cairo |
| | Gradišar | | | Stadium: Al Salam Stadium |

| 3 August 2025 Friendly | Al Ahly | 2–2 | Petrojet |
| | Marei; Sherif |

== Competitions ==
=== Overall record ===
| Competition | First match | Last match | Starting round | Final position | Record | | | | | | | |
| Competition | First match | Last match | Starting round | Final position | Pld | W | D | L | GF | GA | GD | Win % |
|---|---|---|---|---|---|---|---|---|---|---|---|---|
| Premier League First Stage | 9 August 2025 | 9 March 2026 | Matchday 1 | 3rd | 20 | 11 | 7 | 2 | 33 | 19 | +14 | 55.00 |
| Premier League Championship Group | 7 April 2026 | 20 May 2026 | Matchday 1 | 3rd | 6 | 4 | 1 | 1 | 11 | 5 | +6 | 66.67 |
| Egypt Cup | 27 December 2025 | | Round of 32 | Round of 32 | 1 | 0 | 0 | 1 | 1 | 2 | −1 | 0.00 |
| Egyptian League Cup | 12 December 2025 | 15 January 2026 | Group stage | Group stage | 6 | 2 | 0 | 4 | 7 | 9 | −2 | 33.33 |
| Egyptian Super Cup | 6 November 2025 | 9 November 2025 | Semi-finals | Winners | 2 | 2 | 0 | 0 | 4 | 1 | +3 | 100.00 |
| CAF Champions League | 18 October 2025 | 21 March 2026 | First round | Quarter-finals | 10 | 4 | 4 | 2 | 12 | 7 | +5 | 40.00 |
| Total | | | | | 45 | 23 | 12 | 10 | 68 | 43 | +25 | 51.11 |

Last updated: 20 May 2026
Source: Competitions

=== Egyptian Premier League ===
==== Regular season ====
| Pos | Team | Pld | W | D | L | GF | GA | GD | Pts | Qualification |
|---|---|---|---|---|---|---|---|---|---|---|
| 1 | Zamalek | 20 | 13 | 4 | 3 | 32 | 13 | +19 | 43 | Qualification for the championship play-offs |
| 2 | Pyramids | 20 | 13 | 4 | 3 | 33 | 15 | +18 | 43 | Qualification for the championship play-offs |
| 3 | Al Ahly | 20 | 11 | 7 | 2 | 33 | 19 | +14 | 40 | Qualification for the championship play-offs |
| 4 | Ceramica Cleopatra | 20 | 11 | 5 | 4 | 29 | 16 | +13 | 38 | Qualification for the championship play-offs |
| 5 | Al Masry | 20 | 8 | 8 | 4 | 29 | 20 | +9 | 32 | Qualification for the championship play-offs |

Source: Soccerway (regular season)
Rules for classification: 1) Points; 2) Goal difference; 3) Goals scored.

===== Results summary =====
| Overall | | | | | | | | Home | | | | | | Away | | | | | |
| Pld | W | D | L | GF | GA | GD | Pts | W | D | L | GF | GA | GD | W | D | L | GF | GA | GD |
|---|---|---|---|---|---|---|---|---|---|---|---|---|---|---|---|---|---|---|---|
| 0 | 0 | 0 | 0 | 0 | 0 | 0 | 0 | 0 | 0 | 0 | 0 | 0 | 0 | 0 | 0 | 0 | 0 | 0 | 0 |

===== Results by round =====
| Round | 1 | 2 | 3 | 4 | 5 | 6 | 7 | 8 | 9 | 10 | 11 | 12 | 13 | 14 | 15 | 16 | 17 | 18 | 19 | 20 | 21 |
|---|---|---|---|---|---|---|---|---|---|---|---|---|---|---|---|---|---|---|---|---|---|
| Ground | A | H | | A | H | A | H | A | H | A | H | A | H | H | A | H | A | H | A | H | A |
| Result | D | W | B | D | L | D | W | W | W | W | W | D | D | W | L | W | D | W | W | D | W |
| Position | 5 | 2 | 6 | 6 | 13 | 15 | 10 | 7 | 4 | 4 | 2 | 3 | 3 | 3 | 3 | 3 | 4 | 4 | 4 | 4 | 3 |

A = Away; H = Home; W = Win; D = Draw; L = Loss

===== Matches =====
| 9 August 2025 1 | Modern Sport | 2–2 | Al Ahly | Cairo |
| 21:00 UTC+3 | Hassan 58'; Elfil 74' | Report | Reda 50'; Marei 79' | Stadium: Cairo International Stadium |

| 15 August 2025 2 | Al Ahly | 4–1 | Pharco | Cairo |
| 21:00 UTC+3 | Mohamed Sherif 10'; Zizo 21' 59'; Nejc Gradišar 81' | Report | Mohamed Fakhri 70' | Stadium: Cairo International Stadium |

| 19–21 August 2025 3 | Bye |

| 25 August 2025 4 | Ghazl El Mahalla | 0–0 | Al Ahly |

| 30 August 2025 5 | Al Ahly | 0–2 | Pyramids |

| 14 September 2025 6 | ENPPI | 1–1 | Al Ahly |

| 19 September 2025 7 | Al Ahly | 1–0 | Ceramica Cleopatra |

| 23 September 2025 8 | Haras El Hodoud | 2–3 | Al Ahly |

| 29 September 2025 9 | Al Ahly | 2–1 | Zamalek |

| 4 October 2025 10 | Kahrabaa Ismailia | 2–4 | Al Ahly |

| 22 October 2025 11 | Al Ahly | 2–1 | Al Ittihad |

| 29 October 2025 12 | Petrojet | 1–1 | Al Ahly |

| 2 November 2025 13 | Al Ahly | 0–0 | Al Masry |

| 27 January 2026 16 | Al Ahly | 3–1 | Wadi Degla |

| 3 February 2026 17 | National Bank | 1–1 | Al Ahly |

| 11 February 2026 14 | Al Ahly | 2–0 | Ismaily |

| 19 February 2026 18 | Al Ahly | 1–0 | El Gouna |

| 23 February 2026 19 | Smouha | 0–1 | Al Ahly |

| 28 February 2026 20 | Al Ahly | 1–1 | ZED |

| 5 March 2026 21 | Al Mokawloon Al Arab | 1–3 | Al Ahly |

| 9 March 2026 15 | Tala'ea El Gaish | 2–1 | Al Ahly |

==== Championship round ====
| 7 April 2026 1 | Ceramica Cleopatra | 1–1 | Al Ahly |

| 11 April 2026 2 | Al Ahly | 2–1 | Smouha |

| 22–23 April 2026 3 | Bye |

| 27 April 2026 4 | Pyramids | 3–0 | Al Ahly |

| 1 May 2026 5 | Zamalek | 0–3 | Al Ahly |

| 5 May 2026 6 | Al Ahly | 3–0 | ENPPI |

| 20 May 2026 7 | Al Masry | 0–2 | Al Ahly |

=== Egypt Cup ===
| 27 December 2025 Round of 32 | Al Ahly | 1–2 (a.e.t.) | We SC |
| | Kamal 41'; Mohamed (red card) 96' | | Fawzy 81', 110' |

=== Egyptian League Cup ===
==== Group stage ====
Group A

| 12 December 2025 1 | Al Ahly | 0–1 | ENPPI |

| 19 December 2025 2 | Ceramica Cleopatra | 0–1 | Al Ahly |

| 23 December 2025 3 | Ghazl El Mahalla | 2–1 | Al Ahly |

| 30 December 2025 4 | Al Ahly | 0–3 | Al Mokawloon Al Arab |

| 4–6 January 2026 5 | Bye |

| 10 January 2026 6 | Pharco | 1–4 | Al Ahly |

| 15 January 2026 7 | Al Ahly | 1–2 | Tala'ea El Gaish |

=== CAF Champions League ===
Al Ahly will receive a bye to the second round.

| 17–19 October 2025 First leg | TBD | v | (Egypt) Al Ahly |

| 24–26 October 2025 Second leg | Al Ahly (Egypt) | v | TBD |

== Statistics ==
=== Squad statistics ===
| No. | Pos | Nat | Player | Total | | EPL | | CAF CL | | Other^{1} | |
| No. | Pos | Nat | Player | Apps | Goals | Apps | Goals | Apps | Goals | Apps | Goals |
|---|---|---|---|---|---|---|---|---|---|---|---|
| 1 | GK | (Egypt) | Mohamed El Shenawy | 0 | 0 | 0 | 0 | 0 | 0 | 0 | 0 |
| 2 | DF | (Egypt) | Yassin Marei | 2 | 1 | 2 | 1 | 0 | 0 | 0 | 0 |
| 3 | DF | (Egypt) | Omar Kamal | 0 | 0 | 0 | 0 | 0 | 0 | 0 | 0 |
| 4 | DF | (Egypt) | Ahmed Ramadan | 0 | 0 | 0 | 0 | 0 | 0 | 0 | 0 |
| 5 | MF | (Tunisia) | Mohamed Ali Ben Romdhane | 2 | 0 | 2 | 0 | 0 | 0 | 0 | 0 |
| 6 | DF | (Egypt) | Yasser Ibrahim | 1 | 0 | 1 | 0 | 0 | 0 | 0 | 0 |
| 7 | FW | (Egypt) | Trézéguet | 2 | 0 | 2 | 0 | 0 | 0 | 0 | 0 |
| 8 | MF | (Egypt) | Ahmed Reda | 2 | 1 | 2 | 1 | 0 | 0 | 0 | 0 |
| 9 | FW | (Slovenia) | Nejc Gradišar | 2 | 1 | 2 | 1 | 0 | 0 | 0 | 0 |
| 10 | FW | (Egypt) | Mohamed Sherif | 2 | 0 | 2 | 0 | 0 | 0 | 0 | 0 |
| 11 | FW | (Egypt) | Ahmed Abdelkader | 0 | 0 | 0 | 0 | 0 | 0 | 0 | 0 |
| 12 | DF | (Egypt) | Mohamed Shokry | 1 | 0 | 1 | 0 | 0 | 0 | 0 | 0 |
| 13 | MF | (Egypt) | Marwan Attia | 0 | 0 | 0 | 0 | 0 | 0 | 0 | 0 |
| 14 | FW | (Egypt) | Hussein El Shahat | 0 | 0 | 0 | 0 | 0 | 0 | 0 | 0 |
| 15 | DF | (Morocco) | Achraf Dari | 1 | 0 | 1 | 0 | 0 | 0 | 0 | 0 |
| 17 | MF | (Morocco) | Achraf Bencharki | 2 | 0 | 2 | 0 | 0 | 0 | 0 | 0 |
| 19 | MF | (Egypt) | Afsha | 1 | 0 | 1 | 0 | 0 | 0 | 0 | 0 |
| 20 | DF | (Egypt) | Mostafa El Aash | 0 | 0 | 0 | 0 | 0 | 0 | 0 | 0 |
| 22 | MF | (Egypt) | Emam Ashour | 0 | 0 | 0 | 0 | 0 | 0 | 0 | 0 |
| 23 | MF | (Mali) | Aliou Dieng | 1 | 0 | 1 | 0 | 0 | 0 | 0 | 0 |
| 25 | FW | (Egypt) | Ahmed Sayed | 2 | 2 | 2 | 2 | 0 | 0 | 0 | 0 |
| 26 | GK | (Egypt) | Mohamed Seha | 0 | 0 | 0 | 0 | 0 | 0 | 0 | 0 |
| 28 | FW | (Egypt) | Karim Fouad | 2 | 0 | 2 | 0 | 0 | 0 | 0 | 0 |
| 29 | FW | (Egypt) | Taher Mohamed | 2 | 0 | 2 | 0 | 0 | 0 | 0 | 0 |
| 30 | DF | (Egypt) | Mohamed Hany | 2 | 0 | 2 | 0 | 0 | 0 | 0 | 0 |
| 31 | GK | (Egypt) | Mostafa Shobeir | 2 | 0 | 2 | 0 | 0 | 0 | 0 | 0 |
| 36 | MF | (Egypt) | Koka | 2 | 0 | 2 | 0 | 0 | 0 | 0 | 0 |
| 38 | FW | (Egypt) | Mohamed Abdallah | 0 | 0 | 0 | 0 | 0 | 0 | 0 | 0 |
| 39 | FW | (Egypt) | Hamza Abdelkarim | 0 | 0 | 0 | 0 | 0 | 0 | 0 | 0 |
| 40 | DF | (Egypt) | Ahmed Abdin | 0 | 0 | 0 | 0 | 0 | 0 | 0 | 0 |

Last updated: 10 August 2025

^{1} Includes, 2025 Egyptian Super Cup, 2025 CAF Super Cup, and 2025–26 Egyptian League Cup.
