= Nejc Gradišar =

Slovenian footballer (born 2002)

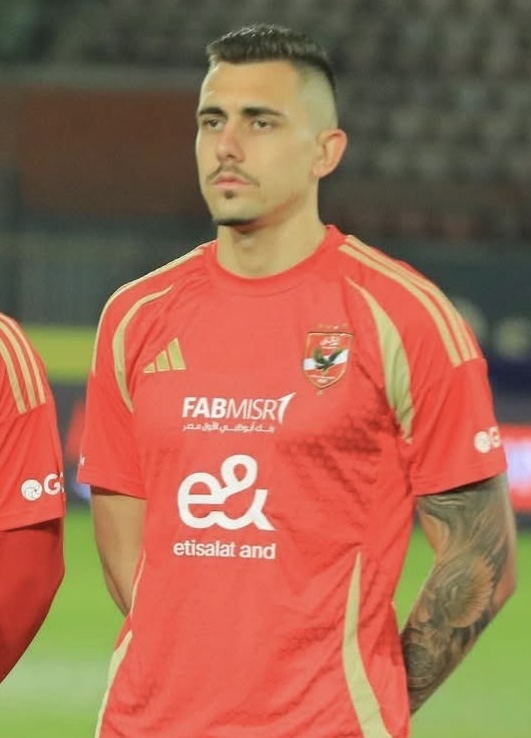
- Gradišar lining up for Al Ahly in 2025

Personal information
- Date of birth: 6 August 2002 (age 24)
- Place of birth: Piran, Slovenia
- Height: 1.85 m (6 ft 1 in)
- Position: Striker

Team information
- Current team: Ceramica Cleopatra (on loan from Al Ahly)

Youth career
- –2010: Krim
- 2010–2012: Interblock
- 2012–2020: Bravo

Senior career*
Years	Team	Apps	(Gls)
2020–2022	Bravo	1	(0)
2021	→ Brežice 1919 (loan)	15	(7)
2022	→ Rogaška (loan)	12	(4)
2022–2024	Rogaška	42	(19)
2024–2025	Fehérvár	31	(8)
2025–	Al Ahly	24	(8)
2026	→ Újpest (loan)	13	(1)
2026–	→ Ceramica Cleopatra (loan)	0	(0)

International career
2023–2025	Slovenia U21	12	(1)
2024–2025	Slovenia	3	(1)
- * Club domestic league appearances and goals as of 2 July 2026

Nejc Gradišar (born 6 August 2002) is a Slovenian professional footballer who plays as a striker for Egyptian Premier League club Ceramica Cleopatra, on loan from Al Ahly.

== Club career ==
Gradišar was born in Piran and grew up in Škofljica. He made his Slovenian First League debut for Bravo in July 2020 in a match against Triglav Kranj. In summer 2022, after not being offered a new contract with Bravo, Gradišar signed permanently for Rogaška until 30 June 2025.

On 6 February 2024, Gradišar signed for Hungarian club Fehérvár. He made his league debut the next day in a 2–1 victory against Kisvárda, where he also scored his first goal. He also scored in a 2–1 victory against Diósgyőri in the second round of the 2024–25 Magyar Kupa.

On 24 January 2025, Gradišar signed for Al Ahly, becoming the first Slovenian to play for the Egyptian club. On 26 January, he made his league debut against cross-city rivals Pyramids, also scoring the final goal of the match in a 2–2 draw. On 22 February, Gradišar provided an assist to Achraf Bencharki in a 1–1 draw against Zamalek in his first Cairo derby match.

== International career ==
Gradišar debuted for the Slovenia national team on 20 January 2024 in a friendly match against the United States, where he scored the only goal of the game in Slovenia's 1–0 victory.

== Career statistics ==
=== Club ===
As of match played 9 November 2025

Appearances and goals by club, season and competition
Club	Season	League			National cup (Note: Includes Slovenian Cup, Magyar Kupa, Egypt Cup)		League cup (Note: Includes Egyptian League Cup)		Continental		Other		Total	
Club	Season	Division	Apps	Goals	Apps	Goals	Apps	Goals	Apps	Goals	Apps	Goals	Apps	Goals
Bravo	2019–20	Slovenian PrvaLiga	1	0	—		—		—		—		1	0
Bravo	2020–21	Slovenian PrvaLiga	0	0	—		—		—		—		0	0
Bravo	2021–22	Slovenian PrvaLiga	0	0	—		—		—		—		0	0
Bravo	Total		1	0	—		—		—		—		1	0
Brežice 1919 (loan)	2021–22	Slovenian Second League	15	7	—		—		—		—		15	7
Rogaška (loan)	2021–22	Slovenian Second League	12	4	—		—		—		—		12	4
Rogaška	2022–23	Slovenian Second League	28	12	4	3	—		—		—		32	15
Rogaška	2023–24	Slovenian PrvaLiga	14	7	1	1	—		—		—		15	8
Rogaška	Total		42	19	5	4	—		—		—		47	23
Fehérvár	2023–24	NB I	14	1	—		—		—		—		14	1
Fehérvár	2024–25	NB I	17	7	2	1	—		3 (Note: Appearances in UEFA Conference League)	0	—		22	8
Fehérvár	Total		31	8	2	1	—		3	0	—		36	9
Al Ahly	2024–25	Egyptian Premier League	14	5	—		—		4 (Note: Appearances in CAF Champions League)	0	3 (Note: Appearances in FIFA Club World Cup)	0	21	5
Al Ahly	2025–26	Egyptian Premier League	10	3	0	0	0	0	1	0	2 (Note: Appearances in Egyptian Super Cup)	1	13	4
Al Ahly	Total		24	8	0	0	0	0	5	0	5	1	34	9
Career total			125	46	7	5	0	0	8	0	5	1	145	52

=== International ===
Appearances and goals by national team and year
National team	Year	Apps	Goals
Slovenia	2024	1	1
Slovenia	2025	2	0
Total		3	1

Scores and results list Slovenia's goal tally first, score column indicates score after each Gradišar goal.

List of international goals scored by Nejc Gradišar
No.	Date	Venue	Opponent	Score	Result	Competition
1	20 January 2024	Toyota Field, San Antonio, United States	United States	1–0	1–0	Friendly

== Honours ==
Al Ahly

- Egyptian Premier League: 2024–25
- Egyptian Super Cup: 2025
