= 2023–24 Fehérvár FC season =

Fehérvár
2023–24 season
- Owner: István Garancsi
- Manager: Bartosz Grzelak
- Stadium: Sóstói Stadion
- Nemzeti Bajnokság I: 4th
- Magyar Kupa: Round of 64
- Top goalscorer: League: Kenan Kodro (11); All: Kenan Kodro (11)
- Highest home attendance: 8,061 v Ferencváros (10 March 2024, Nemzeti Bajnokság I)
- Lowest home attendance: 1,752 v Kecskemét (26 November 2023, Nemzeti Bajnokság I)
- Average home league attendance: 3,962
- Biggest win: 5–0 v Mezőkövesd (Home, 6 April 2024, Nemzeti Bajnokság I)
- Biggest defeat: 0–4 v Diósgyőr (Away, 24 February 2024, Nemzeti Bajnokság I)
Home colours	Away colours

The 2023–24 season was Fehérvár Football Club's 55th competitive season, 24th consecutive season in the Nemzeti Bajnokság I and 81st year in existence as a football club. In addition to the domestic league, Fehérvár participated in that season's editions of the Magyar Kupa.

At the end of the previous season, title sponsor MOL did not extend the cooperation with the club, that partnered with Fehérvár since 2010 and contributed to the successes in domestic and European competitions.

This was the first ever season since 2012–13 without Stopira, who has played the most international matches for the club and was released at the end of his contract and the first time since 2015–16 without Loïc Négo who was released and later signed with Le Havre, both of them leaving at the summer transfer window.

== Squad ==
Squad at end of season

Note: Flags indicate national team as defined under FIFA eligibility rules; some limited exceptions apply. Players may hold more than one non-FIFA nationality.

No.	Pos.	Nation	Player
3	DF	DEN	Kasper Larsen
4	DF	HUN	Csaba Spandler
5	DF	HUN	Attila Fiola
7	MF	HUN	Szabolcs Schön
9	FW	HUN	Marcell Berki
13	MF	HUN	Zsolt Kalmár
14	DF	HUN	Áron Csongvai
15	FW	ARG	Nicolás Stefanelli
16	DF	HUN	Mario Simut
18	MF	HUN	Dávid Sigér
19	FW	HUN	Patrik Kovács
20	MF	NOR	Tobias Christensen
21	MF	POR	Rúben Pinto

No.	Pos.	Nation	Player
22	GK	HUN	Balázs Tóth
24	MF	HUN	Zsombor Menyhárt
31	DF	MKD	Nikola Serafimov
33	DF	HUN	Barnabás Bese
42	GK	HUN	Emil Rockov
44	DF	HUN	Bence Gergényi
65	DF	HUN	Szilveszter Hangya
68	FW	SVN	Nejc Gradišar
70	FW	FRA	Mamoudou Karamoko (loaned from Copenhagen)
71	FW	HUN	Tamás Tóth
75	GK	HUN	Dániel Veszelinov
77	MF	HUN	Mátyás Katona
99	MF	HUN	Milán Pető

== Transfers ==
=== Transfers in ===
Transfer window	Pos.	No.	Player	From
Summer	DF	4	(Hungary) Csaba Spandler	Free agent (Note: Previous club Puskás Akadémia.)
Summer	MF	6	(France) Franck-Yves Bambock	(France) Grenoble
Summer	FW	9	(Hungary) Marcell Berki	(Austria) Red Bull Salzburg
Winter	FW	15	(Argentina) Nicolás Stefanelli	(United States) Inter Miami
Winter	DF	16	(Hungary) Mario Simut	Free agent (Note: Previous club Haladás.)
Winter	MF	18	(Hungary) Dávid Sigér	Free agent (Note: Previous club Ferencváros.)
Winter	FW	19	(Hungary) Patrik Kovács	Vasas
Winter	FW	68	(Slovenia) Nejc Gradišar	(Slovenia) Rogaška
Winter	GK	75	(Hungary) Dániel Veszelinov	(Slovakia) DAC Dunajská Streda

=== Transfers out ===
Transfer window	Pos.	No.	Player	To
Summer	DF	8	(Ukraine) Yevhen Makarenko	Released (Note: Joined Ordabasy.)
Summer	DF	11	(Hungary) Loïc Négo	Released (Note: Joined Le Havre.)
Summer	DF	13	(Ukraine) Artem Shabanov	Released (Note: Joined Polissya Zhytomyr.)
Summer	DF	22	(Cape Verde) Stopira	Released
Summer	FW	23	(Hungary) Palkó Dárdai	(Germany) Hertha BSC
Summer	DF	29	(Hungary) Zsolt Kojnok	Released (Note: Joined Mezőkövesd.)
Summer	DF	55	(Germany) Marcel Heister	Released (Note: Joined Ludogorets Razgrad.)
Summer	GK	74	(Hungary) Ádám Kovácsik	Released (Note: Joined Mezőkövesd.)
Summer	MF	94	(Romania) Claudiu Bumba	Released (Note: Joined Győr.)
Summer	MF	95	(Brazil) Alef	Released (Note: Joined São Bernardo.)
Winter	GK	1	(Hungary) Dániel Kovács	Released (Note: Joined Volos.)
Winter	MF	12	(Honduras) Deiby Flores	(Canada) Toronto FC
Winter	FW	19	(Bosnia and Herzegovina) Kenan Kodro	Ferencváros

=== Loans in ===
Transfer window	Pos.	No.	Player	From	End date
Summer	FW	70	(France) Mamoudou Karamoko	(Denmark) Copenhagen	End of season

=== Loans out ===
Transfer window	Pos.	No.	Player	To	End date
Summer	GK	54	(Hungary) Martin Dala	Nyíregyháza	End of season
Summer	MF	83	(Hungary) Bence Babos	Ajka	End of season
Winter	MF	6	(France) Franck-Yves Bambock	(Greece) Panetolikos	End of season
Winter	MF	10	(Kosovo) Lirim Kastrati	(Croatia) Lokomotiva	End of season
Winter	FW	11	(Hungary) Levente Szabó	Diósgyőr	End of season

== Competitions ==
=== Overview ===
Competition	First match	Last match	Starting round	Final position	Record							
Competition	First match	Last match	Starting round	Final position	Pld	W	D	L	GF	GA	GD	Win %
Nemzeti Bajnokság I	29 July 2023	18 May 2024	Matchday 1	4th	33	16	6	11	55	40	+15	48.48
Magyar Kupa	16 September 2023	16 September 2023	Round of 64	Round of 64	1	0	0	1	0	1	−1	0.00
Total					34	16	6	12	55	41	+14	47.06

Source: Competitions

=== Nemzeti Bajnokság I ===
==== League table ====
Pos	Team	Pld	W	D	L	GF	GA	GD	Pts	Qualification or relegation
2	Paks	33	17	7	9	51	42	+9	58	Qualification for the Europa League first qualifying round (Note: Paks qualified for the Europa League first qualifying round by winning the 2023–24 Magyar Kupa. Since they qualified based on league position, the second Conference League second round spot was passed to the fourth-placed team.)
3	Puskás Akadémia	33	15	10	8	60	35	+25	55	Qualification for the Conference League second qualifying round
4	Fehérvár	33	16	6	11	55	40	+15	54	Qualification for the Conference League second qualifying round
5	Debrecen	33	14	6	13	49	48	+1	48	
6	Kecskemét	33	13	6	14	45	45	0	45	

Source: Hungarian Football Federation (in Hungarian), Soccerway
Rules for classification: 1) Points; 2) Matches won; 3) Goal difference; 4) Goals scored; 5) Head-to-head points; 6) Head-to-head goal difference; 7) Fair play ranking; 8) Drawing of lots.

==== Results summary ====
Overall								Home						Away					
Pld	W	D	L	GF	GA	GD	Pts	W	D	L	GF	GA	GD	W	D	L	GF	GA	GD
33	16	6	11	55	40	+15	54	10	4	2	40	17	+23	6	2	9	15	23	−8

Source: Hungarian Football Federation

==== Results by round ====
Round	1	2	3	4	5	6	7	8	9	10	11	12	13	14	15	16	17	18	19	20	21	22	23	24	25	26	27	28	29	30	31	32	33
Ground	A	H	A	A	H	A	H	H	H	A	H	H	A	H	H	A	H	A	A	A	H	A	A	H	A	A	H	A	H	A	H	A	H
Result	L	L	L	D	W	L	D	W	W	L	W	W	W	D	W	W	W	L	W	W	W	L	L	L	W	D	W	W	D	L	W	L	D
Position	8	11	12	11	9	9	9	9	8	8	7	5	4	5	3	3	3	3	3	3	3	3	3	3	3	3	3	3	2	3	3	3	4
Points	0	0	0	1	4	4	5	8	11	11	14	17	20	21	24	27	30	30	33	36	39	39	39	39	42	43	46	49	50	50	53	53	54

Source: Matches
A = Away; H = Home; W = Win; D = Draw; L = Loss

==== Matches ====
29 July 2023 1	Újpest	2–1	Fehérvár	Budapest
20:15 CEST (UTC+2)	Ljujić 12', (yellow card) 35'; Antzoulas (yellow card) 15'; Csoboth (red card) 34'; Mack 42', (yellow card) 77'; Vignjević (manager) (yellow card) 78'; Pauljević (yellow card) 82'	Report	Katona 47', (yellow card) 54'; Schön (yellow card) 90+7'	Stadium: Szusza Ferenc Stadion; Attendance: 6,085; Referee: Ferenc Karakó

6 August 2023 2	Fehérvár	3–5	Ferencváros	Székesfehérvár
17:45 CEST (UTC+2)	Kastrati 45'; Zeke (yellow card) 50'; Kodro 53', 57', (yellow card) 90+4'	Report	Lisztes 13'; Ramírez 30'; Baráth (yellow card) 48'; Zachariassen 63'; B. Varga 66'; Traoré 71'	Stadium: Sóstói Stadion; Attendance: 7,051; Referee: Tamás Bognár
Note: The match was originally scheduled for 5 August 2023, but was postponed due to Ferencváros's participation in European competition.

13 August 2023 3	Kecskemét	1–0	Fehérvár	Kecskemét
21:00 CEST (UTC+2)	Szalai (yellow card) 15', (goal) 35'; K. Nagy (yellow card) 67'; Varga (yellow card) 80'; Leoni (yellow card) 90'; KHorváth (yellow card) 90+5'	Report	Zeke (yellow card) 34'; Csongvai (yellow card) 88'	Stadium: Széktói Stadion; Attendance: 3,487; Referee: József Erdős

18 August 2023 4	Puskás Akadémia	2–2	Fehérvár	Felcsút
18:00 CEST (UTC+2)	Plšek 11', 75'; Batik (yellow card) 69'; Szolnoki (yellow card) 87'; Gruber (yellow card) 90+9'	Report	Kalmár (yellow card) 18'; Kodro 40'; Serafimov (yellow card) 57'; Katona 90+5'	Stadium: Pancho Aréna; Attendance: 3,102; Referee: Sándor Andó-Szabó

27 August 2023 5	Fehérvár	2–0	Mezőkövesd	Székesfehérvár
19:30 CEST (UTC+2)	Szabó 82'; Kastrati 90+4', (yellow card) 90+5'	Report	Beriashvili (yellow card) 17'; Kállai (yellow card) 63'; Brtan (yellow card) 84'	Stadium: Sóstói Stadion; Attendance: 3,217; Referee: Gergő Bogár

2 September 2023 6	Paks	2–0	Fehérvár	Paks
19:30 CEST (UTC+2)	K. Kovács (yellow card) 8'; Windecker (yellow card) 38', (goal) 53'; Lenzsér (yellow card) 52'; Mezei 73'	Report	Christensen (yellow card) 44'; Serafimov (yellow card) 56'; Karamoko (yellow card) 69'	Stadium: Fehérvári úti Stadion; Attendance: 2,411; Referee: István Vad

24 September 2023 7	Fehérvár	3–3	Zalaegerszeg	Székesfehérvár
15:00 CEST (UTC+2)	Karamoko 34'; Fiola (red card) 60'; Csongvai (yellow card) 60'; Kalmár 64', (yellow card) 81'; Szabó (yellow card) 90+8', (goal) 90+9'	Report	Medgyes (yellow card) 20'; Croizet 46'; Evangelou 72'; Špoljarić 80' (pen.); Todoroski (yellow card) 90'	Stadium: Sóstói Stadion; Attendance: 2,565; Referee: István Vad

1 October 2023 8	Fehérvár	3–1	Kisvárda	Székesfehérvár
15:00 CEST (UTC+2)	Serafimov 29'; Schön (yellow card) 36'; Flores (yellow card) 41', (goal) 90+5'; Kodro 60'; Katona (yellow card) 64'	Report	Camaj 11', (yellow card) 20'; Melnyk (yellow card) 36'; Mešanović (yellow card) 42'; Lippai (yellow card) 59'; Balogh (yellow card) 90+2'	Stadium: Sóstói Stadion; Attendance: 2,272; Referee: József Erdős

8 October 2023 9	Fehérvár	3–0	MTK	Székesfehérvár
13:00 CEST (UTC+2)	Fiola (yellow card) 34'; Serafimov (yellow card) 40'; Katona 45+1'; Kalmár 54', 89'; Gergényi (yellow card) 68'	Report	Kádár (red card) 20'; Thiam (red card) 43'	Stadium: Sóstói Stadion; Attendance: 3,136; Referee: Gergő Bogár

22 October 2023 10	Debrecen	3–1	Fehérvár	Debrecen
15:30 CEST (UTC+2)	Bárány 6'; Domingues 33', 71'; Romanchuk (yellow card) 35'	Report	Szabó (yellow card) 15', (goal) 46'; Serafimov (yellow card) 56'; Karamoko (yellow card) 90'	Stadium: Nagyerdei Stadion; Attendance: 5,870; Referee: Balázs Berke

28 October 2023 11	Fehérvár	4–0	Diósgyőr	Székesfehérvár
14:45 CEST (UTC+2)	Schön (yellow card) 32'; B. Tóth (yellow card) 33'; Christensen 41'; Kodro 45+1', 83'; Kastrati 82'	Report	Gera (yellow card) 16'; Acolatse (yellow card) 60'; Farkaš (red card) 69'; Kampetsis (yellow card) 71'; Szatmári (red card) 86'	Stadium: Sóstói Stadion; Attendance: 3,096; Referee: Tamás Bognár

4 November 2023 12	Fehérvár	2–1	Újpest	Székesfehérvár
18:00 CET (UTC+1)	Schön (yellow card) 38'; Kastrati 80', (yellow card) 85'; Christensen (yellow card) 81'; Karamoko 89'	Report	Ambrose 8', (yellow card) 49'; Kosanović (yellow card) 32'; Tajti (yellow card) 38'	Stadium: Sóstói Stadion; Attendance: 4,990; Referee: Sándor Andó-Szabó

12 November 2023 13	Ferencváros	0–1	Fehérvár	Budapest
16:00 CET (UTC+1)	Ben Romdhane (yellow card) 35'; Marquinhos (yellow card) 82'; Sigér (yellow card) 86'	Report	L. Szabó 67'; Flores (yellow card) 90+2'; B. Tóth (yellow card) 90+6'; Pinto (yellow card) 90+7'	Stadium: Groupama Arena; Attendance: 11,007; Referee: Ferenc Karakó

26 November 2023 14	Fehérvár	3–3	Kecskemét	Székesfehérvár
19:30 CET (UTC+1)	M. Katona 11', 61', 90+1'	Report	Szalai 9', (yellow card) 34'; Zsótér (yellow card) 65'; Szűcs (yellow card) 72'; O. Nagy 77'; Szendrei 80'; Szabó (yellow card) 90+4'	Stadium: Sóstói Stadion; Attendance: 1,752; Referee: Dr Bence Csonka

2 December 2023 15	Fehérvár	3–1	Puskás Akadémia	Székesfehérvár
15:30 CET (UTC+1)	Kodro 6', 76' (pen.); Katona (yellow card) 23'; Christensen 34', (yellow card) 83'; Szabó (yellow card) 44'; Flores (yellow card) 57'	Report	Nagy (yellow card) 26'; Colley 58'	Stadium: Sóstói Stadion; Attendance: 2,172; Referee: Tamás Bognár

10 December 2023 16	Mezőkövesd	0–2	Fehérvár	Mezőkövesd
15:30 CET (UTC+1)	Gomis (yellow card) 76'; Kuttor (manager) (red card) 90+3'	Report	Serafimov (yellow card) 9'; Kodro 90+5' (pen.); Christensen 90+8'	Stadium: Városi Stadion; Attendance: 1,527; Referee: István Vad

16 December 2023 17	Fehérvár	3–0	Paks	Székesfehérvár
12:30 CET (UTC+1)	Katona 1'; Kodro 19', 68', (yellow card) 59'; Christensen (yellow card) 45'	Report	Vas (yellow card) 30'; Mezei (yellow card) 57'; Beke (yellow card) 82'; K. Kovács (yellow card) 86'; Böde (yellow card) 90+4'	Stadium: Sóstói Stadion; Attendance: 4,078; Referee: Gergő Bogár

3 February 2024 18	Zalaegerszeg	3–1	Fehérvár	Zalaegerszeg
12:30 CET (UTC+1)	Mance 8', 45+2'; Bedi (yellow card) 57'; Márton (manager) (yellow card) 57'; Várkonyi (yellow card) 72'; Croizet 86'	Report	T. Tóth (yellow card) 29'; Csongvai 73', (yellow card) 85'	Stadium: ZTE Arena; Attendance: 2,479; Referee: István Vad

7 February 2024 19	Kisvárda	1–2	Fehérvár	Kisvárda
17:45 CET (UTC+1)	Nikolov (yellow card) 50'; Melnyk (yellow card) 85'; Larsen 87' (o.g.)	Report	Gradišar 56'; Stefanelli 82'; T. Tóth (yellow card) 84'	Stadium: Várkerti Stadion; Attendance: 1,850; Referee: Tamás Bognár

10 February 2024 20	MTK	0–2	Fehérvár	Budapest
15:00 CET (UTC+1)	Kata (yellow card) 20'; Hey (yellow card) 73'	Report	T. Tóth 15'; Stefanelli 25'	Stadium: Hidegkuti Nándor Stadion; Attendance: 2,839; Referee: Ferenc Karakó

18 February 2024 21	Fehérvár	1–0	Debrecen	Székesfehérvár
15:00 CET (UTC+1)	Christensen 30' (pen.); Serafimov (yellow card) 41'; Simut (yellow card) 90+6'	Report	Baranyai (yellow card) 25'; Blagojević (manager) (yellow card) 28'; Ojediran (yellow card) 67'	Stadium: Sóstói Stadion; Attendance: 4,770; Referee: Sándor Andó-Szabó

24 February 2024 22	Diósgyőr	4–0	Fehérvár	Miskolc
15:00 CET (UTC+1)	Bényei (yellow card) 3'; Gergényi 19' (o.g.); Jurek (yellow card) 37'; Feuillassier 70'; Szabó 87' (pen.), 89'	Report	Csongvai (red card) 18'; Serafimov (yellow card) 86'	Stadium: Diósgyőri Stadion; Attendance: 5,164; Referee: Csaba Pintér

3 March 2024 23	Újpest	2–0	Fehérvár	Budapest
19:00 CET (UTC+1)	Kobouri (yellow card) 65'; Tajti 76'; Ambrose 77'	Report	Schön (yellow card) 81'; Gergényi (yellow card) 89'; Pető (yellow card) 90+3'	Stadium: Szusza Ferenc Stadion; Attendance: 3,201; Referee: Gergő Bogár

10 March 2024 24	Fehérvár	0–2	Ferencváros	Székesfehérvár
15:30 CET (UTC+1)	Katona (yellow card) 22'; Serafimov (yellow card) 50'	Report	B. Varga 42', 51', (yellow card) 59'	Stadium: Sóstói Stadion; Attendance: 8,061; Referee: Balázs Berke

16 March 2024 25	Kecskemét	0–1	Fehérvár	Kecskemét
17:45 CET (UTC+1)	L. Katona (yellow card) 19'; Lukács (yellow card) 78'; Banó-Szabó (yellow card) 82'; Szűcs (yellow card) 90+4'; Májer (red card) 90+9'	Report	Csongvai (yellow card) 3'; Christensen (yellow card) 33'; Schön (yellow card) 45'	Stadium: Széktói Stadion; Attendance: 2,548; Referee: István Vad

29 March 2024 26	Puskás Akadémia	0–0	Fehérvár	Felcsút
20:00 CET (UTC+1)	Szolnoki (yellow card) 45'	Report	Fiola (yellow card) 36'; Gergényi (yellow card) 50'	Stadium: Pancho Aréna; Attendance: 3,617; Referee: József Erdős

6 April 2024 27	Fehérvár	5–0	Mezőkövesd	Székesfehérvár
14:15 CEST (UTC+2)	Stefanelli 31'; Christensen 61', 70' (pen.); Karamoko 76'; Berki 83'	Report	Kállai (yellow card) 66'	Stadium: Sóstói Stadion; Attendance: 3,233; Referee: Péter Antal

13 April 2024 28	Paks	1–2	Fehérvár	Paks
19:30 CEST (UTC+2)	Balogh 84'; Lenzsér (yellow card) 90+7'	Report	Karamoko 23', 54'; Csongvai (red card) 46'; B. Tóth (yellow card) 79'; Fiola (yellow card) 90+7'	Stadium: Fehérvári úti Stadion; Attendance: 3,511; Referee: Gergő Bogár

21 April 2024 29	Fehérvár	1–1	Zalaegerszeg	Székesfehérvár
16:00 CEST (UTC+2)	Gergényi (yellow card) 63'; Christensen 70' (pen.); Schön (yellow card) 72'	Report	Safronov (yellow card) 53', (goal) 86'; Dombó (yellow card) 69'; Evangelou (yellow card) 89'	Stadium: Sóstói Stadion; Attendance: 3,756; Referee: Dr Bence Csonka

28 April 2024 30	Kisvárda	1–0	Fehérvár	Kisvárda
15:15 CEST (UTC+2)	Matić (yellow card) 23'; Camaj 53' (pen.); Lucas (yellow card) 90+4'	Report	Serafimov (yellow card) 52'; Gradišar (yellow card) 77'; Fiola (yellow card) 79'	Stadium: Várkerti Stadion; Attendance: 2,350; Referee: Csaba Pintér

3 May 2024 31	Fehérvár	4–0	MTK	Székesfehérvár
20:00 CEST (UTC+2)	Katona 23'; Christensen 32'; Csongvai 40'; Pető 77'	Report	Kádár (red card) 10'	Stadium: Sóstói Stadion; Attendance: 3,104; Referee: József Erdős

12 May 2024 32	Debrecen	1–0	Fehérvár	Debrecen
19:30 CEST (UTC+2)	Lagator (yellow card) 23'; Ferenczi (yellow card) 34'; Vajda (yellow card) 54'; Baranyai (yellow card) 73'; Drešković 79'; Bódi (yellow card) 90+3'; Szécsi (yellow card) 90+4'; Lončar (yellow card) 90+7'	Report	Sigér (yellow card) 65'	Stadium: Nagyerdei Stadion; Attendance: 5,347; Referee: Tamás Bognár

18 May 2024 33	Fehérvár	0–0	Diósgyőr	Székesfehérvár
17:45 CEST (UTC+2)	Gergényi (yellow card) 56'; Spandler (yellow card) 77'	Report	Klimovich (yellow card) 11'; Lund (yellow card) 48'; Gera (yellow card) 49'; Szabó (yellow card) 53'; Jurek (yellow card) 62'; Chorbadzhiyski (yellow card) 70'	Stadium: Sóstói Stadion; Attendance: 6,133; Referee: Ferenc Karakó

=== Magyar Kupa ===
16 September 2023 Round of 64	ESMTK	1–0	Fehérvár	Budapest
15:00 CEST (UTC+2)	T. Molnár (yellow card) 35'; J. Molnár (yellow card) 59'; Lucz 75'; Jeszenszky (yellow card) 90+2'	Report	Gergényi (yellow card) 71'; Csongvai (yellow card) 90+2'	Stadium: ESMTK Stadion; Attendance: 900; Referee: Péter Antal

== Statistics ==
=== Overall ===
Appearances (Apps) numbers are for appearances in competitive games only, including sub appearances.
Source: Competitions

No.	Player	Pos.	Nemzeti Bajnokság I				Magyar Kupa				Total			
No.	Player	Pos.	Apps	Goal	Booked	Sent off (straight red)	Apps	Goal	Booked	Sent off (straight red)	Apps	Goal	Booked	Sent off (straight red)
1	(Hungary) Dániel Kovács	GK	3								3			
3	(Denmark) Kasper Larsen	DF	6								6			
4	(Hungary) Csaba Spandler	DF	25		1		1				26		1	
5	(Hungary) Attila Fiola	DF	12		4	1	1				13		4	1
6	(France) Franck-Yves Bambock	MF	2				1				3			
7	(Hungary) Szabolcs Schön	MF	31		7		1				32		7	
8	(France) Lyes Houri	MF	2								2			
9	(Hungary) Marcell Berki	FW	13	1							13	1		
10	(Kosovo) Lirim Kastrati	MF	18	4	2		1				19	4	2	
11	(Hungary) Levente Szabó	FW	16	4	3		1				17	4	3	
11	(Hungary) Márió Zeke	DF	3		2						3		2	
12	(Honduras) Deiby Flores	MF	16	1	3		1				17	1	3	
13	(Hungary) Zsolt Kalmár	MF	11	3	2		1				12	3	2	
14	(Hungary) Áron Csongvai	DF	30	2	4	2	1		1		31	2	5	2
15	(Argentina) Nicolás Stefanelli	FW	14	3							14	3		
16	(Hungary) Mario Simut	DF	6		1						6		1	
18	(Hungary) Bence Kovács	GK												
18	(Hungary) Dávid Sigér	MF	14		1						14		1	
19	(Bosnia and Herzegovina) Kenan Kodro	FW	17	11	2		1				18	11	2	
19	(Hungary) Patrik Kovács	FW	4								4			
20	(Norway) Tobias Christensen	MF	32	9	4		1				33	9	4	
21	(Portugal) Rúben Pinto	MF	11		1						11		1	
22	(Hungary) Balázs Tóth	GK	30		3		1				31		3	
24	(Hungary) Zsombor Menyhárt	MF												
31	(North Macedonia) Nikola Serafimov	DF	30	1	9						30	1	9	
33	(Hungary) Barnabás Bese	DF	30				1				31			
34	(Hungary) Tamás Fodor-Papp	GK												
42	(Hungary) Emil Rockov	GK												
44	(Hungary) Bence Gergényi	DF	25		5		1		1		26		6	
51	(Hungary) Roland Gergely	GK												
65	(Hungary) Szilveszter Hangya	DF												
68	(Slovenia) Nejc Gradišar	FW	14	1	1						14	1	1	
70	(France) Mamoudou Karamoko	FW	23	5	2		1				24	5	2	
71	(Hungary) Tamás Tóth	FW	10	1	2						10	1	2	
75	(Hungary) Dániel Veszelinov	GK												
77	(Hungary) Mátyás Katona	MF	33	8	4		1				34	8	4	
99	(Hungary) Milán Pető	MF	18	1	1						18	1	1	
Own goals														
Totals				55	64	3			2			55	66	3

=== Hat-tricks ===
No.	Player	Against	Result	Date	Competition
77	(Hungary) Mátyás Katona	Kecskemét (H)	3–3	26 November 2023	Nemzeti Bajnokság I

=== Clean sheets ===
			Clean sheets		
No.	Player	Games Played	Nemzeti Bajnokság I	Magyar Kupa	Total
22	(Hungary) Balázs Tóth	31	13	0	13
1	(Hungary) Dániel Kovács	3	0		0
18	(Hungary) Bence Kovács	0			0
34	(Hungary) Tamás Fodor-Papp	0			0
42	(Hungary) Emil Rockov	0			0
51	(Hungary) Roland Gergely	0			0
75	(Hungary) Dániel Veszelinov	0			0
Totals			13	0	13
