= Youssef Abdelhafiz =

Egyptian footballer (born 2005)

Personal information
- Full name: Youssef Sayed Mohamed Mohamed Abdelhafiz
- Date of birth: 5 January 2005 (age 21)
- Place of birth: Cairo, Egypt
- Height: 1.75 m (5 ft 9 in)
- Position: Right-back

Team information
- Current team: Al Ahly

Youth career
- –2024: Al Ahly

Senior career*
Years	Team	Apps	(Gls)
2024–	Al Ahly	3	(0)
2024–2025	→Ceramica Cleopatra(loan)	0	(0)
- * Club domestic league appearances and goals as of 17 September 2025

Youssef Sayed Mohamed Mohamed Abdelhafiz (Arabic: يُوسُف سَيِّد مُحَمَّد مُحَمَّد عَبْد الْحَفِيظ; born 5 January 2005) is an Egyptian professional footballer who plays as a right-back for Egyptian Premier League club Ceramica Cleopatra on loan from Al Ahly .

== Club career ==
He joined Ceramica Cleopatra on loan in September 2024 alongside his teammate Ahmed Abdin.

== Personal life ==
Youssef is the son of former Egyptian national team winger Sayed Abdel Hafeez.

== Career statistics ==
=== Club ===
As of 16 September 2024

Appearances and goals by club, season and competition
Club	Season	League			Cup		Continental		Other		Total	
Club	Season	Division	Apps	Goals	Apps	Goals	Apps	Goals	Apps	Goals	Apps	Goals
Al Ahly	2023–24	EPL	3	0	0	0	0	0	0	0	3	0
Ceramica Cleopatra	2024–25	EPL	0	0	0	0	0	0	0	0	0	0
Career total			3	0	0	0	0	0	0	0	3	0

== Honors and achievements ==
Al Ahly

- Egyptian Premier League: 2023–24
- CAF Champions League: 2023–24
