= Sayed Abdel Hafeez =

Egyptian footballer (born 1977)

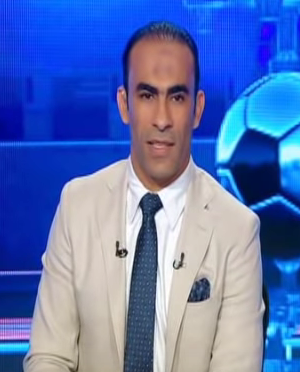

Personal information
- Full name: Sayed Mohamed Mohamed Abdel Hafeez
- Date of birth: 27 October 1977 (age 49)
- Place of birth: Faiyum, Egypt
- Height: 1.73 m (5 ft 8 in)
- Position: Winger

Team information
- Current team: Al Ahly (director of football)

Youth career
- 1989–1996: Al Ahly

Senior career*
Years	Team	Apps	(Gls)
1996–2006	Al Ahly	500	(25)
2006–2006	→ Al Wehda (loan)	20	(15)
Total		520	(40)

International career
1997–2004	Egypt	25	(2)
- * Club domestic league appearances and goals

Sayed Mohamed Mohamed Abdel Hafeez (Arabic: سيد محمد محمد عبد الحفيظ; born 27 October 1977) is an Egyptian retired professional footballer who played as a winger.

== Personal life ==
Sayed is the father of Al Ahly right-back Youssef Abdel Hafeez.

== Career statistics ==
=== International ===
Team	Year	Apps	Goals
Egypt	1998	1	0
Egypt	1999	1	0
Egypt	2000	9	1
Egypt	2001	7	0
Egypt	2002	2	1
Egypt	2003	5	0
Total		25	2

=== International Goals ===
Scores and results list Egypt's goal tally first.

No.	Date	Venue	Opponent	Score	Result	Competition
1	2 September 2000	Alexandria Stadium, Alexandria, Egypt	Ivory Coast	1–0	1–0	2002 Africa Cup of Nations qualification
2	16 December 2002	Mohammed bin Zayed Stadium, Abu Dhabi, United Arab Emirates	United Arab Emirates	1–0	2–1	Friendly

== Honours ==
=== Club ===
Al Ahly

- Egyptian Premier League: 1996–97, 1997–98, 1998–99, 1999–00, 2004–05, 2005–06
- Egypt Cup: 2001, 2003
- Egyptian Super Cup: 2002, 2005
- CAF Champions League: 2001, 2005
- CAF Super Cup: 2002
