= Balázs Tóth (footballer, born 1997) =

Hungarian footballer

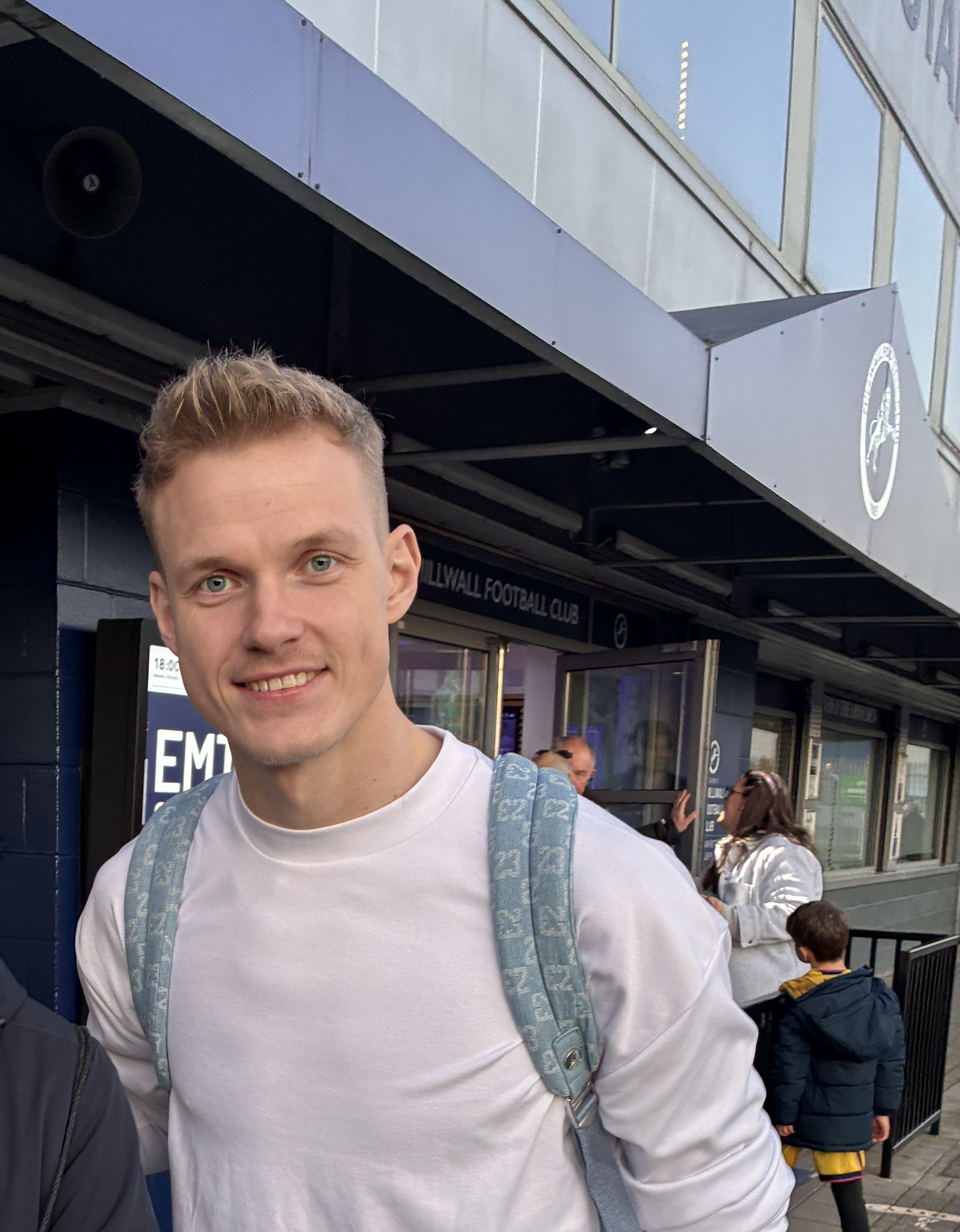
- Tóth in 2026

Personal information
- Full name: Balázs Tóth
- Date of birth: 4 September 1997 (age 29)
- Place of birth: Kazincbarcika, Hungary
- Height: 1.91 m (6 ft 3 in)
- Position: Goalkeeper

Team information
- Current team: Blackburn Rovers
- Number: 22

Youth career
- 2008–2010: Kazincbarcika
- 2010–2012: Puskás Akadémia
- 2012–2013: Fehérvár
- 2013–2015: Puskás Akadémia

Senior career*
Years	Team	Apps	(Gls)
2015–2024	Puskás Akadémia	76	(0)
2015–2024	→ Puskás Akadémia II	44	(0)
2018–2019	→ Csákvár (loan)	25	(0)
2023–2024	→ Fehérvár (loan)	29	(0)
2024	Fehérvár	5	(0)
2024–	Blackburn Rovers	49	(0)

International career^{‡}
2013–2014	Hungary U17	2	(0)
2015	Hungary U19	1	(0)
2018	Hungary U21	1	(0)
2025–	Hungary	13	(0)
- * Club domestic league appearances and goals as of 15:53, 24 October 2026 (UTC) ‡ National team caps and goals as of 18 November 2026

Balázs Tóth (Hungarian pronunciation: [ˈbɒlaːʒ ˈtoːt]; born 4 September 1997) is a Hungarian professional footballer who plays as a goalkeeper for EFL Championship club Blackburn Rovers and the Hungary national team.

== Club career ==
=== Early career ===
Tóth first played in the youth setup at Kazincbarcikai SC, receiving a contract after scoring 11 goals in a school match in Zubogy. He was initially a striker, but switched to playing as a goalkeeper after standing in during a training session and impressing coach István Szabó.

At 12 years old, Tóth signed for Puskás Akadémia FC. In 2012, Tóth joined the Fehérvár FC under-17 team, before returning to Puskás Akadémia a year later.

=== Puskás Akadémia ===
In the 2015–16 season, Tóth won the Hungarian U19 league. He was an unused substitute in two home games during the 2016–17 season against Szolnoki MÁV FC and SZEOL SC, with Puskás Akadémia winning the Nemzeti Bajnokság II.

==== 2018–19: Loan to Aqvital FC Csákvár ====
In 2018, Tóth moved to Nemzeti Bajnokság II team Aqvital FC Csákvár on loan. He made his competitive debut in a 3–3 home draw against Ceglédi VSE, Tóth kept his first clean sheet in a 0–0 home draw against Budafoki MTE. He would go on to make 25 league appearances over the course of the season as Ceglédi finished 11th.

==== Return to Puskás Akadémia ====
On 30 November 2019, Tóth signed a two and a half year contract. He made his Nemzeti Bajnokság I debut on 14 March 2020 against Mezőkövesdi SE, keeping a clean sheet after being substituted on in the 40th minute for an injured Lajos Hegedűs. Once the league resumed after it was postponed due to the COVID-19 pandemic, Tóth established himself as the first choice goalkeeper for the club.

During the 2020–21 season, Tóth played 30 league games and kept 12 clean sheets as Puskás Akadémia finished runners up in the league. Tóth received the "Save of the Month" award in September and February, along with the "Goalkeeper of the Season" award.

In July 2021, Tóth made his UEFA Conference League debut in a 1–1 away draw against FC Inter Turku in the First Qualifying Round. On 15 July 2021, Tóth suffered a shoulder injury in the 89th minute of the 1–0 away win against MTK Budapest FC. This injury would keep him out until his return on 5 March 2022, in a 2–1 away defeat to Újpest FC Tóth played 17 matches and kept 7 clean sheets during the 2021–22 season. On 1 April 2022, Tóth signed a new contract until 2026. In the 2022–23 season, Tóth kept three clean sheets in 20 league appearances.

=== Fehérvár ===
On 9 August 2023, Tóth joined Fehérvár on loan with a permanent transfer option. He made his league debut against his former team in a 2–2 away draw. Tóth would go on to play 30 league games, keeping a clean sheet in 13 of them. On 31 May 2024, Fehérvár exercised their purchase option to sign him on a permanent basis. At the start of the 2024–25 season, Tóth started all four UEFA Conference League matches.

=== Blackburn Rovers ===
On 30 August 2024, Tóth signed for EFL Championship club Blackburn Rovers on a three-year deal for an undisclosed fee. He debuted in a 1–0 victory over Middlesbrough in the 2024–25 FA Cup on 11 January 2025. On 12 April 2025, following an ankle injury to Aynsley Pears, Tóth made his league debut in a 1–0 away win over Luton Town.

On 4 November 2025, Tóth was substituted in the 89th minute during a 1–0 win over Bristol City with a suspected knee injury. The following day, head coach Valérien Ismaël confirmed that Tóth would be sidelined for up to three months after undergoing knee surgery.

On 2 May 2026, he won the Players’ Player of the Year award, voted by his teammates.

== International career ==
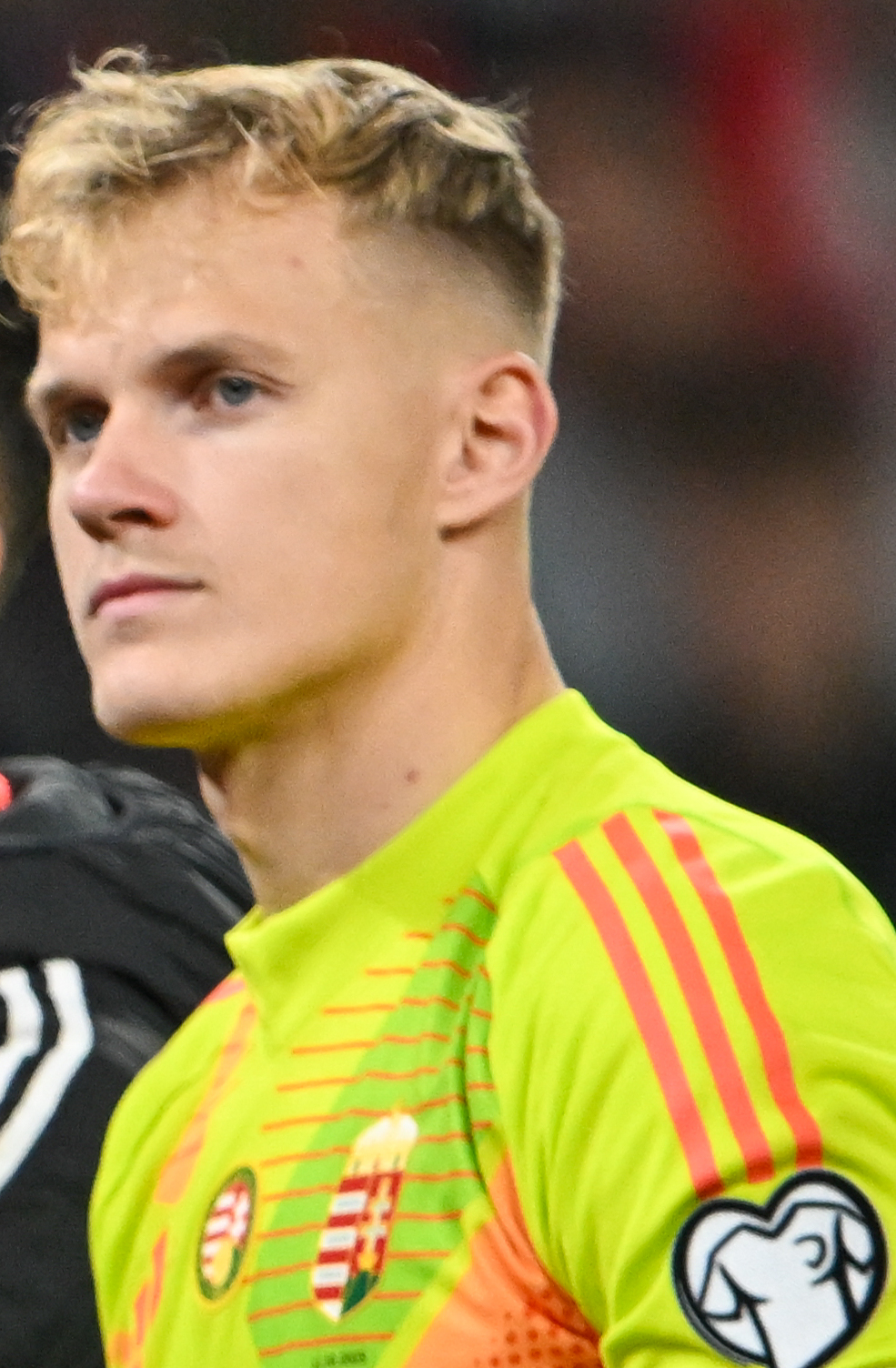
Tóth with Hungary in 2025.

Tóth's first international match was for Hungary U17 in a 2–1 home defeat to Montenegro U17 on 27 August 2013. He was called up again on 19 February 2014 to face Italy U17 in a 6–0 away defeat, in which he was substituted at half time. On 15 October 2015, Tóth started for Hungary U19 in a 5–1 away defeat against Slovakia U19 and was substituted at the half time interval. Tóth came on as a substitute for Hungary U21 in a 3–3 away draw with Azerbaijan U21 on 8 June 2018.

Tóth received a call up from head coach Marco Rossi in March 2021 for the FIFA World Cup qualifiers against Poland, San Marino, and Andorra, however he was an unused substitute in all three matches. Due to his shoulder injury in July 2021, it would not be until November 2022 before Tóth was named in the national side again, and was an unnamed substitute for the friendly matches against Luxembourg and Greece.

On 9 September 2025, he replaced injured Dénes Dibusz in the 2026 FIFA World Cup qualification match against Portugal. The match ended with a 3–2 victory for Portugal. After the match he received s score 7 out of 10 from the journalist of Nemzeti Sport.

== Personal life ==
Balázs Tóth's father was a Nemzeti Bajnokság II goalkeeper.

== Career statistics ==
=== Club ===
As of match played 24 October 2026

Appearances and goals by club, season and competition
Club	Season	League			Cup (Note: Appearances in Magyar Kupa, FA Cup)		League Cup		Continental		Other		Total	
Club	Season	Division	Apps	Goals	Apps	Goals	Apps	Goals	Apps	Goals	Apps	Goals	Apps	Goals
Puskás Akadémia II	2015–16	Nemzeti Bajnokság III	11	0	—		—		—		—		11	0
Puskás Akadémia II	2016–17	Nemzeti Bajnokság III	13	0	—		—		—		—		13	0
Puskás Akadémia II	2017–18	Nemzeti Bajnokság III	15	0	—		—		—		—		15	0
Puskás Akadémia II	2019–20	Nemzeti Bajnokság III	5	0	—		—		—		—		5	0
Puskás Akadémia II	Total		44	0	0	0	—		0	0	0	0	44	0
Csákvár	2018–19	Nemzeti Bajnokság II	25	0	0	0	—		—		—		25	0
Csákvár	Total		25	0	0	0	—		0	0	0	0	25	0
Puskás Akadémia	2019–20	Nemzeti Bajnokság I	9	0	4	0	—		0	0	—		13	0
Puskás Akadémia	2020–21	Nemzeti Bajnokság I	30	0	4	0	—		0	0	—		34	0
Puskás Akadémia	2021–22	Nemzeti Bajnokság I	17	0	0	0	—		4 (Note: Appearances in UEFA Europa Conference League)	0	—		21	0
Puskás Akadémia	2022–23	Nemzeti Bajnokság I	20	0	0	0	—		0	0	—		20	0
Puskás Akadémia	Total		76	0	8	0	—		4	0	0	0	88	0
Fehérvár	2023–24	Nemzeti Bajnokság I	30	0	1	0	—		—		—		30	0
Fehérvár	2024–25	Nemzeti Bajnokság I	5	0	0	0	—		4	0	—		3	0
Fehérvár	Total		35	0	1	0	—		4	0	0	0	33	0
Blackburn Rovers	2024-25	EFL Championship	6	0	2	0	0	0	0	0	0	0	8	0
Blackburn Rovers	2025–26	EFL Championship	34	0	1	0	0	0	—		—		35	0
Blackburn Rovers	2026–27	EFL Championship	9	0	0	0	1	0	—		0	0	10	0
Blackburn Rovers	Total		49	0	3	0	1	0	0	0	0	0	53	0
Career total			229	0	12	0	1	0	10	0	0	0	243	0

=== International ===
As of 17 November 2026

Appearances and goals by national team and year
National Team	Year	Apps	Goals
Hungary	2025	3	0
Hungary	2026	10	0
Total		13	0

== Honours ==
Puskás Akadémia U19

- Hungarian U19 League: 2015–16

Puskás Akadémia

- Nemzeti Bajnokság I runner-up: 2020–21

Individual

- Nemzeti Bajnokság I Goalkeeper of the Season: 2020–21
- Nemzeti Bajnokság I Save of the Month: September 2020, February 2021
