= 2025–26 Egyptian League Cup =

Egyptian League Cup
Tournament details
- Dates: 9 December 2025 – 8 June 2026
- Teams: 21

Final positions
- Champions: Al Masry (1st title)
- Runners-up: ENPPI
- Third place: Wadi Degla
- Fourth place: ZED

Tournament statistics
- Matches played: 71
- Goals scored: 166 (2.34 per match)
- Top goal scorer(s): Sekou Sonko (Petrojet); 6 goals

The Egyptian Professional Clubs League Cup 2026, officially known as the Egypt Capital Cup, is the fifth edition of the competition. It features only Egyptian Premier League clubs. The tournament draw took place on 27 July 2025, dividing the 21 teams into three groups of seven. The winner earns qualification to the 2026-27 Egyptian Super Cup.

== Group stage ==
On 8 September 2025, the Egyptian Professional Clubs League announced the match schedule, with the tournament scheduled to begin on 9 December 2025.

The top two teams from each group, along with the two best third-placed teams, advance to the quarter-finals.

=== Group A ===
Pos	Team	Pld	W	D	L	GF	GA	GD	Pts	Qualification
1	Tala'ea El Gaish	6	4	1	1	7	3	+4	13	Advance to the quarter-finals
2	Al Mokawloon Al Arab	6	3	2	1	9	5	+4	11	Advance to the quarter-finals
3	ENPPI	6	3	1	2	7	5	+2	10	Advance to the quarter-finals
4	Pharco	6	3	0	3	8	10	−2	9	
5	Ghazl El Mahalla	6	2	2	2	4	4	0	8	
6	Al Ahly	6	2	0	4	7	9	−2	6	
7	Ceramica Cleopatra	6	1	0	5	2	8	−6	3	

Source: EFL
Rules for classification: Group stage tiebreakers
9 December 2025

Pharco	3–2	Al Mokawloon Al Arab

10 December 2025

Tala'ea El Gaish	2–0	Ceramica Cleopatra

11 December 2025

Al Ahly	0–1	ENPPI

19 December 2025

Ghazl El Mahalla	0–1	Pharco

19 December 2025

Ceramica Cleopatra	0–1	Al Ahly

20 December 2025

ENPPI	2–1	Tala'ea El Gaish

23 December 2025

Ghazl El Mahalla	2–1	Al Ahly

24 December 2025

Pharco	2–1	ENPPI

24 December 2025

Al Mokawloon Al Arab	0–0	Tala'ea El Gaish

30 December 2025

Tala'ea El Gaish	1–0	Ghazl El Mahalla

30 December 2025

Al Ahly	0–3	Al Mokawloon Al Arab

31 December 2025

Ceramica Cleopatra	2–1	Pharco

4 January 2026

Tala'ea El Gaish	1–0	Pharco

5 January 2026

Al Mokawloon Al Arab	1–1	Ghazl El Mahalla

6 January 2026

ENPPI	2–0	Ceramica Cleopatra

10 January 2026

Pharco	1–4	Al Ahly

12 January 2026

Al Mokawloon Al Arab	2–1	ENPPI

12 January 2026

Ghazl El Mahalla	1–0	Ceramica Cleopatra

15 January 2026

Al Ahly	1–2	Tala'ea El Gaish

15 January 2026

Ceramica Cleopatra	0–1	Al Mokawloon Al Arab

16 January 2026

ENPPI	0–0	Ghazl El Mahalla

=== Group B ===
Pos	Team	Pld	W	D	L	GF	GA	GD	Pts	Qualification
1	Petrojet	6	5	0	1	15	5	+10	15	Advance to the quarter-finals
2	El Gouna	6	4	1	1	10	5	+5	13	Advance to the quarter-finals
3	Wadi Degla	6	3	1	2	12	6	+6	10	Advance to the quarter-finals
4	National Bank	6	1	4	1	11	7	+4	7	
5	Modern Sport	6	1	2	3	3	7	−4	5	
6	Ismaily	6	1	2	3	5	7	−2	5	
7	Pyramids	6	1	0	5	3	22	−19	3	

Source: EFL
Rules for classification: Group stage tiebreakers
9 December 2025

Pyramids	1–6	National Bank

10 December 2025

Ismaily	1–3	El Gouna

11 December 2025

Wadi Degla	1–2	Petrojet

18 December 2025

National Bank	1–1	Modern Sport

19 December 2025

Petrojet	1–0	Ismaily

20 December 2025

El Gouna	2–0	Pyramids

23 December 2025

Modern Sport	0–3	Wadi Degla

25 December 2025

El Gouna	1–1	National Bank

25 December 2025

Pyramids	1–3	Ismaily

31 December 2025

Petrojet	2–1	National Bank

1 January 2026

Ismaily	0–0	Modern Sport

1 January 2026

Wadi Degla	0–1	El Gouna

4 January 2026

Modern Sport	0–1	Pyramids

5 January 2026

National Bank	2–2	Wadi Degla

6 January 2026

El Gouna	1–3	Petrojet

10 January 2026

Wadi Degla	4–0	Pyramids

11 January 2026

Petrojet	0–2	Modern Sport

12 January 2026

National Bank	0–0	Ismaily

15 January 2026

Pyramids	0–7	Petrojet

17 January 2026

Modern Sport	0–2	El Gouna

17 January 2026

Ismaily	1–2	Wadi Degla

=== Group C ===
Pos	Team	Pld	W	D	L	GF	GA	GD	Pts	Qualification
1	Al Masry	6	3	2	1	5	3	+2	11	Advance to the quarter-finals
2	ZED	6	3	1	2	6	4	+2	10	Advance to the quarter-finals
3	Al Ittihad	6	1	5	0	5	2	+3	8	
4	Kahrabaa Ismailia	6	1	5	0	12	11	+1	8	
5	Smouha	6	2	2	2	4	5	−1	8	
6	Zamalek	6	2	1	3	7	9	−2	7	
7	Haras El Hodoud	6	0	2	4	4	9	−5	2	

Source: EFL
Rules for classification: Group stage tiebreakers
9 December 2025

Kahrabaa Ismailia	3–3	Zamalek

10 December 2025

ZED	1–0	Smouha

11 December 2025

Al Ittihad	0–0	Al Masry

19 December 2025

Al Masry	1–0	ZED

20 December 2025

Smouha	0–0	Al Ittihad

20 December 2025

Zamalek	2–1	Haras El Hodoud

24 December 2025

Kahrabaa Ismailia	1–1	Al Ittihad

25 December 2025

Zamalek	0–1	Smouha

25 December 2025

Haras El Hodoud	0–1	Al Masry

30 December 2025

Smouha	2–2	Kahrabaa Ismailia

31 December 2025

ZED	2–0	Haras El Hodoud

1 January 2026

Al Ittihad	3–0	Zamalek

4 January 2026

Haras El Hodoud	3–3	Kahrabaa Ismailia

5 January 2026

Al Masry	2–0	Smouha

6 January 2026

Al Ittihad	1–1	ZED

10 January 2026

Kahrabaa Ismailia	1–1	Al Masry

11 January 2026

Zamalek	0–1	ZED

11 January 2026

Smouha	1–0	Haras El Hodoud

15 January 2026

Al Masry	0–2	Zamalek

17 January 2026

Haras El Hodoud	0–0	Al Ittihad

17 January 2026

ZED	1–2	Kahrabaa Ismailia

=== The third-placed teams ===
Pos	Team	Pld	W	D	L	GF	GA	GD	Pts	Qualification
1	Wadi Degla	6	3	1	2	12	6	+6	10	Advance to the quarter-finals
2	ENPPI	6	3	1	2	7	5	+2	10	Advance to the quarter-finals
3	Al Ittihad	6	1	5	0	5	2	+3	8	

Source: EFL
Rules for classification: Group stage tiebreakers

== Knock-out stage ==
The quarter-finals and semi-finals are played on a home-and-away basis, with no extra time in the event of a draw.

=== Quarter-finals ===
First legs

25 March 2026

Wadi Degla	3–1	Tala'ea El Gaish

25 March 2026

ENPPI	0–1	Petrojet

26 March 2026

El Gouna	0–2	Al Masry

26 March 2026

ZED	0–0	Al Mokawloon Al Arab

Second legs

29 March 2026

Tala'ea El Gaish	2–1	Wadi Degla

29 March 2026

Petrojet	0–4	ENPPI

30 March 2026
17:00

Al Mokawloon Al Arab	1–1	ZED

Osman Ahmed Osman Stadium, Cairo
Referee: Amin Omar

30 March 2026
20:00

Al Masry	2–2	El Gouna

Suez Stadium, Suez
Referee: Sobhi Al-Amrawi

=== Semi-finals ===
First legs

25 May 2026
17:00

ENPPI	0–0	Wadi Degla

Petrosport Stadium, New Cairo

25 May 2026
20:00

ZED	1–0	Al Masry

Suez Stadium, Suez

=== Second legs ===
1 June 2026
17:00

Al Masry	1–0	ZED
Penalties
	6–5

Suez Stadium, Suez

1 June 2026
20:00

Wadi Degla	0–1	ENPPI

Al Salam Stadium, Cairo

=== Third-place match ===
8 June 2026
17:00

ZED	0–2	Wadi Degla

Suez Stadium, Suez

=== Final ===
8 June 2026
20:30

ENPPI	0–3	Al Masry

Suez Stadium, Suez

== Statistics ==
=== Top goalscorers ===
As of 30 March 2026

Rank	Player	Club	Goals
1	(Senegal) Sekou Sonko	Petrojet	6
2	(Eritrea) Ali Sulieman	Kahrabaa Ismailia	5
3	(Egypt) Mohamed El Nahas	El Gouna	3
3	(Egypt) Mohamed El Sayed Shika	Kahrabaa Ismailia	3
3	(Egypt) Hussein El Shahat	Al Ahly	3
3	(Egypt) Adham Hamed	Petrojet	3
3	(Uganda) Joackiam Ojera	Al Mokawloon Al Arab	3
3	(Egypt) Ahmed Amin Oufa	National Bank	3
3	(Egypt) Youssef Oya	Wadi Degla	3
