= 2024–25 Ceramica Cleopatra FC season =

Ceramica Cleopatra
2024–25 season
- Manager: Ayman El Ramadi
- Stadium: Cairo International Stadium
- Egyptian Premier League: 5th
- Egypt Cup: Quarter-finals
- Egyptian League Cup: Group stage
- Egyptian Super Cup: Fourth place
- Top goalscorer: League: Mahmoud Zalaka (4); All: Mahmoud Zalaka (5)
- Biggest win: Ceramica Cleopatra 4–1 Modern Sport; Ceramica Cleopatra 3–0 La Viena FC
- Biggest defeat: Ceramica Cleopatra 0–5 National Bank
- All statistics correct as of 17 January 2025.

The 2024–25 season is the 18th season in Ceramica Cleopatra FC's history and the 66th consecutive season in the Premier League. In addition to the domestic league, Ceramica Cleopatra is set to compete in the domestic cup, the Egyptian League Cup, and the Egyptian Super Cup.

== Transfers ==
=== In ===
Date	Pos.	Player	From	Fee	Ref.
27 August 2024	MF	(Egypt) Mohamed Sadek	(Egypt) Pyramids	Undisclosed	
14 September 2024	DF	(Iraq) Zaid Tahseen	(Iraq) Al-Quwa Al-Jawiya	Free	
16 September 2024	DF	(Egypt) Ahmed Abdin	(Egypt) Al Ahly	Loan	
1 October 2024	DF	(Egypt) Abdallah Magdy	(Egypt) Pyramids	Loan	
2 October 2024	MF	(Egypt) Islam Issa	(Egypt) Pyramids	Loan	
2 October 2024	FW	(South Africa) Fagrie Lakay	(Egypt) Pyramids	Loan	
2 October 2024	MF	(Egypt) Mahmoud Zalaka	(Egypt) Pyramids	Loan	
10 October 2024	DF	(Egypt) Hussein El Sayed	(Egypt) Al Masry	Undisclosed	

=== Out ===
Date	Pos.	Player	To	Fee	Ref.
23 August 2024	MF	(Nigeria) Samuel Amadi	(Egypt) Smouha	Loan	
12 September 2024	MF	(Egypt) Ahmed El Armouty	(Egypt) Al Masry	€131,000	
12 September 2024	DF	(Egypt) Khaled Sobhi	(Egypt) Al Masry	€187,000	
1 October 2024	MF	(Nigeria) Onyema Henry	(Egypt) Petrol Asyut	Free	
2 October 2024	FW	(Nigeria) Sodiq Awujoola	(Egypt) Pyramids	Loan	
12 October 2024	MF	(Nigeria) Favour Akem	(Egypt) El Gouna	Loan	
19 October 2024	MF	(Nigeria) Adeoye Ifeoluwa	(Egypt) Petrojet	Free	

== Friendlies ==
3 November 2024 Friendly	Ceramica Cleopatra (Egypt)	1–0	(Libya) Al Ahli Tripoli	Egypt

== Competitions ==
=== Overall record ===
Competition	First match	Last match	Starting round	Record							
Competition	First match	Last match	Starting round	Pld	W	D	L	GF	GA	GD	Win %
Egyptian Premier League regular season	2 November 2024		Matchday 1	8	4	3	1	12	9	+3	50.00
Egypt Cup	4 January 2025		Round of 32	2	2	0	0	5	0	+5	100.00
Egyptian League Cup	11 December 2024		Group stage	1	0	0	1	0	5	−5	0.00
Egyptian Super Cup	20 October 2024	24 October 2024	Semi-finals	2	0	1	1	3	4	−1	0.00
Total				13	6	4	3	20	18	+2	46.15

Last updated: 17 January 2025
Source: Competitions

=== Egyptian Premier League ===
==== Regular season ====
Pos	Team	Pld	W	D	L	GF	GA	GD	Pts
5	National Bank of Egypt	18	8	5	5	1	2	−1	29
6	Pharco	18	7	5	6	2	1	+1	26
7	Petrojet	18	6	7	5	2	1	+1	25
8	Ceramica Cleopatra	17	6	6	5	0	0	0	24
9	Haras El Hodoud	18	6	4	8	1	2	−1	22

Updated to match(es) played on 13 March 2025. Source: Soccerway (championship round)
Rules for classification: 1) Points; 2) Goal difference; 3) Goals scored; 4) Play-off tie.
(Note: Clubs qualified for this phase with the full regular season points they got, but without goals for or against)

==== Results summary ====
Overall								Home						Away					
Pld	W	D	L	GF	GA	GD	Pts	W	D	L	GF	GA	GD	W	D	L	GF	GA	GD
8	4	3	1	12	9	+3	15	2	1	0	6	2	+4	2	2	1	6	7	−1

Last updated: 10 January 2025.

==== Results by round ====
Round	1	2	3	4	5	6	7	8	9
Ground	A	H	A	H	A	A	H	A	H
Result	L	W	D	W	D	W	D	W	
Position	18	8	11	5	6				

Updated to match(es) played on 10 January 2025. Source:
A = Away; H = Home; W = Win; D = Draw; L = Loss

==== Matches ====
The league schedule was released on 19 October 2024.

2 November 2024 1	Al Ahly	5–2	Ceramica Cleopatra	Cairo
20:00 UTC+2	El Shahat 4', 60'; Abou Ali 45+3', 46'; Mohamed 69'		Belhadji 24' (pen.); Kendouci 79'	Stadium: Al Salam Stadium; Referee: Mahmoud Bassiouni
Note: The match was held at Al Salam Stadium instead of Cairo International Stadium.

9 November 2024 2	Ceramica Cleopatra	1–0	Ismaily	Cairo
20:00 UTC+2	Lakay 43'			Stadium: Osman Ahmed Osman Stadium; Referee: Ahmed Gamal
Note: The match was held at Osman Ahmed Osman Stadium instead of Cairo International Stadium.

24 November 2024 3	Haras El Hodoud	0–0	Ceramica Cleopatra	Alexandria
20:00 UTC+2				Stadium: Haras El Hodoud Stadium; Referee: Mahmoud Nasef

30 November 2024 4	Ceramica Cleopatra	4–1	Modern Sport	Cairo
17:00 UTC+2	Zalaka 3', 57', 81'; Issa 55'		Ngwem 62'	Stadium: Osman Ahmed Osman Stadium; Referee: Hamada Al Qalawi

19 December 2024 5	Zamalek	1–1	Ceramica Cleopatra	Cairo
20:00 UTC+2	Adel 20' (o.g.)		Issa 13'	Stadium: Cairo International Stadium; Referee: Amin Omar

26 December 2024 6	National Bank	1–2	Ceramica Cleopatra	Cairo
17:00 UTC+2	Faisal 42'		Nabil 76'; Osman 78'	Stadium: Cairo International Stadium; Referee: Mohamed El Ghazi

31 December 2024 7	Ceramica Cleopatra	1–1	Al Masry	Suez
15:00 UTC+2	Zalaka 54'; Lakay (penalty missed) 72'		Mohsen 81'	Stadium: Suez Stadium; Referee: Mahmoud Nagi

10 January 2025 8	Tala'ea El Gaish	0–1	Ceramica Cleopatra	Cairo
19:00 UTC+2			Kendouci 66'	Stadium: Gehaz El Reyada Stadium; Referee: Mahmoud El Banna

22 January 2025 9	Ceramica Cleopatra	v	Al Ittihad	Cairo
19:00 UTC+2

=== Egypt Cup ===
4 January 2025 Round of 32	Ceramica Cleopatra	3–0	La Viena FC	Cairo
17:30 UTC+2	Magdy 31'; Belhadji 49'; Moka 84'			Stadium: Osman Ahmed Osman Stadium; Referee: Hosni Sultan

17 January 2025 Round of 16	Ceramica Cleopatra	2–0	Tala'ea El Gaish	Cairo
15:00 UTC+2	Zalaka 47'; Lakay 62'			Stadium: Osman Ahmed Osman Stadium; Referee: Wael Farhan

=== Egyptian League Cup ===
==== Group stage ====
Pos	Team	Pld	W	D	L	GF	GA	GD	Pts	Qualification
1	National Bank	1	1	0	0	5	0	+5	3	Advance to knockout stage
2	Ghazl El Mahalla	1	1	0	0	3	1	+2	3	Advance to knockout stage
3	Al Masry	1	0	1	0	1	1	0	1	
4	ZED	2	0	1	1	2	4	−2	1	
5	Ceramica Cleopatra	1	0	0	1	0	5	−5	0	

Updated to match(es) played on 19 March 2025. Source: EPL
Rules for classification: Group stage tiebreakers

11 December 2024 1	Ceramica Cleopatra	0–5	National Bank	Cairo
20:00 UTC+2	Issa (red card) 26'		Faisal 29', 76'; Annor 53', 78'; Helal 85'	Stadium: Osman Ahmed Osman Stadium; Referee: Wael Farhan

23 March 2025 2	Ceramica Cleopatra	v	Ghazl El Mahalla	Cairo
				Stadium: Osman Ahmed Osman Stadium

2 April 2025 3	Al Masry	v	Ceramica Cleopatra	Suez

23 April 2025 4	ZED	v	Ceramica Cleopatra	Cairo
				Stadium: Cairo International Stadium

=== Egyptian Super Cup ===
20 October 2024 Semi-finals	Al Ahly	2–1	Ceramica Cleopatra	Abu Dhabi, United Arab Emirates
21:00 UTC+4	Mohamed 1', 54'		Lakay 45+3'	Stadium: Mohammed bin Zayed Stadium; Referee: Ahmed El-Ghandour

24 October 2024 Third-place	Pyramids	2–2 (5–4 p)	Ceramica Cleopatra	Abu Dhabi, United Arab Emirates
17:05 UTC+4	Magdy 34' (o.g.); Hamdi 85'		Issa 20'; Belhadji 77' (pen.)	Stadium: Al Nahyan Stadium; Referee: Mahmoud Nagi
	Penalties
	Hamdi (penalty scored); Obama (penalty scored); Sobhi (penalty scored); Hafez (penalty scored); Adel (penalty scored)		(penalty scored) Okoye Ebuka; (penalty scored) Belhadji; (penalty scored) Kendouci; (penalty scored) Nabil; (penalty missed) Mukka

== Statistics ==
=== Goalscorers ===
Rank	Pos.	Player	Premier League	Egypt Cup	EFL Cup	Super Cup	Total
1	MF	(Egypt) Mahmoud Zalaka	4	1	0	0	5
2	MF	(Morocco) Ahmed Belhadji	1	1	0	1	3
2	FW	(Egypt) Islam Issa	2	0	0	1	3
2	FW	(South Africa) Fagrie Lakay	1	1	0	1	3
5	MF	(Algeria) Ahmed Kendouci	2	0	0	0	2
6	MF	(Egypt) Abdallah Magdy	0	1	0	0	1
6	FW	(Egypt) Ayman Moka	0	1	0	0	1
6	DF	(Egypt) Ragab Nabil	1	0	0	0	1
6	FW	(Egypt) Marwan Osman	1	0	0	0	1
Own goals			0	0	0	0	0
Totals			12	5	0	3	20

Last updated: 17 January 2025.
