= Yassin Marei =

Egyptian footballer (born 2001)

Personal information
- Full name: Yassin Sayed Mohamed Mostafa
- Date of birth: 7 November 2001 (age 25)
- Place of birth: Cairo, Egypt
- Height: 1.82 m (6 ft 0 in)
- Position: Centre-back

Team information
- Current team: Al Ahly
- Number: 2

Youth career
- –2020: Zamalek

Senior career*
Years	Team	Apps	(Gls)
2020–2022	Zamalek	2	(0)
2021–2022	→Pharco (loan)	1	(0)
2022–2025	Pharco	56	(2)
2025–	Al Ahly	1	(1)
- * Club domestic league appearances and goals as of 23:14, 9 August 2025 (UTC)

Yassin Sayed Mohamed Marei (Arabic: ياسين سيد محمد مرعي; born 7 November 2001) is an Egyptian professional footballer who plays as a center-back for Egyptian Premier League club Al Ahly and the Egypt national team.

== Career statistics ==
=== Club ===
As of 22 August 2020.

Club	Season	League			Cup		Continental		Other		Total	
Club	Season	Division	Apps	Goals	Apps	Goals	Apps	Goals	Apps	Goals	Apps	Goals
Zamalek	2019–20	Egyptian Premier League	1	0	0	0	0	0	0	0	1	0
Career total			1	0	0	0	0	0	0	0	1	0
