= Ahmed Abdin =

Egyptian footballer (born 2006)

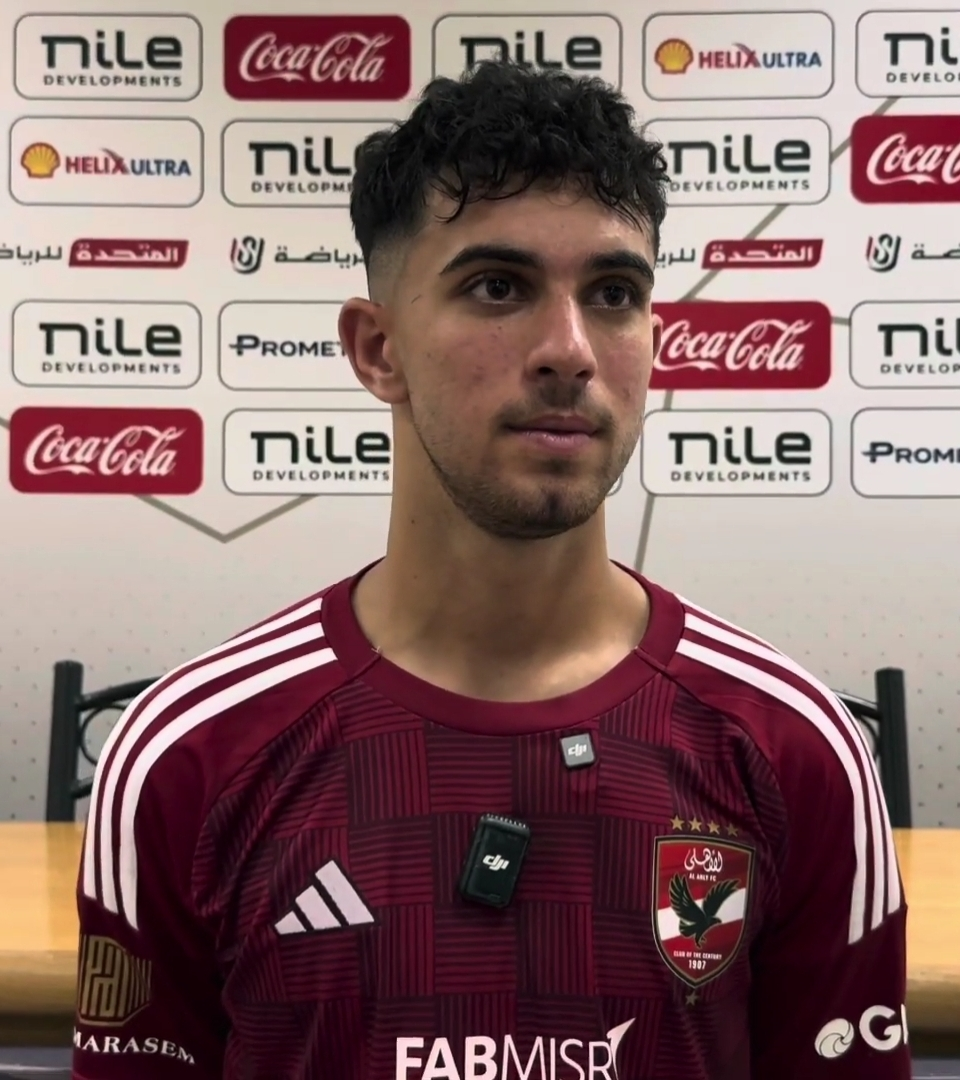
- Abdin with Al Ahly in 2024

Personal information
- Full name: Ahmed Mohamed Ahmed Zaki Abdin
- Date of birth: 1 May 2006 (age 20)
- Place of birth: Cairo, Egypt
- Height: 1.84 m (6 ft 0 in)
- Position: Centre back

Team information
- Current team: Al Ahly
- Number: 40

Youth career
- 2016–2021: Wadi Degla
- 2021–2024: Al Ahly

Senior career*
Years	Team	Apps	(Gls)
2024–	Al Ahly	2	(0)
2024–2025	→Ceramica Cleopatra(loan)	3	(0)

International career^{‡}
2022–2024	Egypt U17	11	(0)
2024–	Egypt U20	16	(0)
- * Club domestic league appearances and goals as of 10 May 2025 ‡ National team caps and goals as of 23:14, 10 May 2025 (UTC)

Ahmed Mohamed Ahmed Zaki Abdin (Arabic: أَحْمَد مُحَمَّد عَابِدِين; born 1 May 2006) is an Egyptian professional footballer who plays as a centre back for Egyptian Premier League club Ceramica Cleopatra on loan from Al Ahly.

== Club career ==
He joined Ceramica Cleopatra on loan in September 2024 alongside his teammate Youssef Abdelhafiz.

== Career statistics ==
=== Club ===
As of 16 September 2024

Appearances and goals by club, season and competition
Club	Season	League			Cup		Continental		Other		Total	
Club	Season	Division	Apps	Goals	Apps	Goals	Apps	Goals	Apps	Goals	Apps	Goals
Al Ahly	2023–24	EPL	2	0	0	0	0	0	0	0	2	0
Ceramica Cleopatra	2024–25	EPL	0	0	0	0	0	0	0	0	0	0
Career total			2	0	0	0	0	0	0	0	2	0

== Honors and achievements ==
Al Ahly

- Egyptian Premier League: 2023–24
- CAF Champions League: 2023–24
