= Trezeguet =

Trezeguet or Trézéguet may refer to:

- David Trezeguet (born 1977), French footballer
- Trézéguet (born 1994), Egyptian footballer
- Jorge Trezeguet (born 1951), Argentine footballer and father of David Trezeguet
