= Al Ahly–Pyramids rivalry =

Rivalry between Egyptian association football clubs

- Location: Cairo, Egypt
- Teams: Al Ahly; Pyramids
- First meeting: 27 October 2014; Egyptian Premier League; Pyramids (as Al Assiouty Sport) 0–0 Al Ahly
- Latest meeting: 27 April 2026; Egyptian Premier League; Pyramids 3–0 Al Ahly
- Next meeting: 23 November 2026; Egyptian Premier League
- Stadiums: Cairo International Stadium; 30 June Stadium; Al Salam Stadium

Statistics
- Total meetings: 25
- Most wins: Al Ahly (11)
- Most player appearances: Mohamed El Shenawy (20)
- Top scorer: Wessam Abou Ali (3)
- All-time series: Al Ahly: 11; Drawn: 6 Pyramids: 8
- Largest victory: Al Ahly 5–0 Pyramids (14 April 2015); Pyramids 3–0 Al Ahly (23 July 2023 and 27 April 2026)
- Longest win streak: 4 matches Pyramids (2018–2020)

The Al Ahly–Pyramids rivalry is a rivalry between the Egyptian football clubs Al Ahly and Pyramids FC, both based in Greater Cairo. Al Ahly hold the record of 45 Egyptian Premier League titles and 12 CAF Champions League titles. Pyramids, founded in 2008 as Al Assiouty Sport, were bought in 2018 by the Saudi official Turki Al-Sheikh, who had been honorary president of Al Ahly the year before, and were renamed and moved to Cairo. The rivalry has been shaped as much by events off the pitch as on it: a falling-out between Al-Sheikh and Al Ahly's board, hostile exchanges between supporters, disputes over referees and fixtures, and a series of players moving from one club to the other.

The fixture grew in importance as Pyramids became a regular title challenger. The club finished runners-up in the Egyptian Premier League in every season from 2021–22 to 2025–26, won the 2024–25 CAF Champions League and won the 2025 CAF Super Cup. Former Al Ahly Football Company president Adly El Keiy said that Pyramids, not Zamalek, were now Al Ahly's main competitor.

Most of the meetings have been in the Egyptian Premier League, and the clubs also met in the 2023 Egyptian Super Cup. The matches have been played at Cairo International Stadium, Al Salam Stadium and 30 June Stadium. The clubs have met 25 times, with Al Ahly winning 11, Pyramids 8 and six matches drawn. as of November 2026, they are due to meet in the Egyptian Premier League on 23 November 2026, with Pyramids top of the table and Al Ahly second.

== History of the rivalry ==
The clubs first met in the 2014–15 Egyptian Premier League, when Al Assiouty Sport, the club that became Pyramids, played its first top-flight season. For the first four years the fixture carried little weight. It became a rivalry after the 2018 takeover and the club's rise to a top-two side from 2021 to 2022.

=== 2014–2018: Before the takeover ===
Al Assiouty Sport won promotion to the Premier League in 2014. The first meeting with Al Ahly, in October 2014, ended 0–0. Al Ahly won the return fixture later that season 5–0. Al Assiouty finished 19th and were relegated, then won Group A of the Egyptian Second Division in 2016–17 and returned to the top flight.

The link between the clubs began off the pitch. In December 2017 Turki Al-Sheikh, then chairman of Saudi Arabia's General Sports Authority, was appointed honorary president of Al Ahly. In June 2018 Al Assiouty's owner announced that the club would be sold to him.

=== 2018–2020: Emergence of the rivalry ===
In the summer of 2018 Al-Sheikh bought Al Assiouty Sport, renamed it Pyramids FC and moved it to Cairo. Hossam El-Badry, a former Al Ahly manager, became chairman. The club spent heavily on signings, including goalkeeper Ahmed El Shenawy from Zamalek. Relations with Al Ahly supporters were hostile from the start: in 2018 Pyramids released an advertisement mocking Al Ahly fans.

On the pitch, Pyramids finished third in the 2018–19 Egyptian Premier League and lost the 2019 Egypt Cup final 3–0 to Zamalek. In July 2019 the Emirati businessman Salem Al Shamsi bought the club from Al-Sheikh. In 2019–20 Pyramids reached the CAF Confederation Cup final, losing 1–0 to RS Berkane. The league meetings in this period were close: Pyramids won 2–1 in January 2019 and Al Ahly won 2–1 in February 2020.

=== 2020–present: Competitive era ===
2020–2023 Pyramids finished second in the league in 2021–22 and 2022–23. Al Ahly won 3–0 in 2021–22 and again 3–0 in January 2023. Al Ahly also won the 2023 Egyptian Super Cup meeting, 1–0. In July 2023, with Al Ahly already champions, Pyramids won 3–0 and ended the champions' unbeaten domestic season, a result that also secured Pyramids' first Champions League place.

2023–2025 Al Ahly won both meetings in July 2024, 3–2 and 1–0, on the way to the 2023–24 title. In 2024–25 Pyramids topped the regular-season table but finished second in the championship round behind Al Ahly. The title was disputed after Al Ahly withdrew from a match against Zamalek in March 2025 and the league first deducted extra points; had that deduction stood, Pyramids would have won the league by one point. The two league meetings that season ended 2–2 and 1–1. Pyramids then won the 2024–25 CAF Champions League, beating Mamelodi Sundowns 3–2 on aggregate, and the 2025 CAF Super Cup.

2025–2026 Pyramids beat Al Ahly 2–0 in August 2025, with two goals from Walid El Karti. The 2025–26 league went to Zamalek on 56 points, ahead of Pyramids on 54 and Al Ahly on 53. On 27 April 2026 Pyramids beat Al Ahly 3–0 in the championship round, with two goals from Fiston Mayele; the result left Al Ahly six points behind the league leader. Former Al Ahly Football Company president Adly El Keiy said that Pyramids, not Zamalek, were now Al Ahly's main competitor.

2026–27 After eight league rounds Pyramids led with 24 points from eight wins and Al Ahly were second on 20. The clubs are scheduled to meet at Cairo International Stadium on 23 November 2026.

== Off-pitch controversies ==
=== Turki Al-Sheikh and Al Ahly ===
Al-Sheikh's appointment as Al Ahly's honorary president in December 2017 was followed by a dispute with the club's board, led by chairman Mahmoud El Khatib. The board and many supporters saw his attempts to influence the running of the club as interference, and El Khatib said publicly that nobody would be allowed to interfere in the club's affairs. Al-Sheikh later said he had a vision for the football team that the board regarded as intervention. According to Enterprise, the rupture was deepened by his role in persuading the Argentinian coach Ramón Díaz to join the Saudi club Al-Ittihad rather than Al Ahly.

Al-Sheikh resigned as honorary president on 25 May 2018, about five months after his appointment. He also filed several legal complaints against the club, which he later instructed his lawyer to drop; Al Ahly's board welcomed the move and wished him and his partner success with Pyramids, describing it as a fair competition. Al-Sheikh then bought Al Assiouty Sport and spent heavily on the new club; Enterprise put the spending on Brazilian players at €40 million, and the club also launched its own television channel, which employed the former England captain John Terry as a pundit. Egyptian fans and officials accused him of undermining Egyptian football and Al Ahly in particular.

=== Disputes over referees and fixtures ===
In Pyramids' first season, Al-Sheikh complained of unfair refereeing in the Egyptian league. He called for foreign referees and threatened to withdraw the club if they were not introduced. A second dispute concerned the calendar. Al Ahly had postponed matches to catch up on, including one against Zamalek, and Al-Sheikh argued it was unfair for Pyramids to play them before those were completed. The Egyptian Football Association agreed and moved the Al Ahly–Pyramids league match from 28 February 2019 to 18 April 2019, a decision Al Ahly publicly objected to. Planet Football described the dispute as a war of words over scheduling that led to the postponement of a game between the two clubs.

=== Fans and provocations ===
Hostility between the supporters began with Pyramids' 2018 advertisement mocking Al Ahly fans. It escalated in September 2018, when Al Ahly supporters chanted insults at Al-Sheikh during the CAF Champions League quarter-final second leg against Horoya AC. The chants led him to announce that he would quit Egyptian football, a decision some commentators linked to the incident and others read as an attempt to defuse the anger of Al Ahly fans. Several Al Ahly fans were arrested after chanting insults at him in a stadium. The Confederation of African Football fined Al Ahly US$20,000 over the chants.

The episode also drew in Zamalek. Al Ahly supporters were wary of the warming relationship between Al-Sheikh and Zamalek chairman Mortada Mansour, who urged Al-Sheikh to reverse his decision and called the chants an orchestrated and funded sham. Al-Sheikh began to provide financial support to Zamalek, and Mansour blamed Al Ahly's board for the insults. Al Ahly's supporters were fined again in April 2019, when the Egyptian Football Association penalised the club EGP 40,000 for fan behaviour during the league match against Pyramids. Al-Sheikh's ownership of Pyramids ended after what Ahram described as a long spell of tension with Al Ahly's fans and management, when the club passed to the Emirati investor Salem Al Shamsi.

=== Transfers between the clubs ===
Afsha, the only direct transfer between the clubs

Players began moving between the clubs in Pyramids' first season after the takeover. In January 2019 Pyramids signed the midfielder Abdallah El Said, who had fallen out with Al Ahly over a new contract and had left the club in 2018, first on loan to Kuopion Palloseura in Finland and then to the Saudi club Al-Ahli; he was set to join the Pyramids squad for the league match against Al Ahly. In August 2019 the traffic went the other way, when Al Ahly completed the signing of Mohamed Magdy (known as Afsha) from Pyramids on a five-year deal after prolonged negotiations; Zamalek had also tried to sign him, and he had spent one season at Pyramids.

Most later moves have gone from Al Ahly to Pyramids. In April 2020 the Egypt captain Ahmed Fathy joined Pyramids on a free transfer after choosing not to renew with Al Ahly, where he had spent twelve years. Goalkeeper Sherif Ekramy, whose contract was also expiring, was reported to have agreed terms with Pyramids in June 2020, and the move was completed in September 2020 on a free transfer, alongside the signing of Ramadan Sobhi, who joined from Huddersfield Town after a loan spell at Al Ahly. Sobhi had announced that he wanted to join Pyramids, making him the second player to choose the club over Al Ahly after Fathy.

The flow continued in 2026. Nasser Maher, a product of Al Ahly's youth teams, joined Pyramids from Zamalek in January 2026, and in August 2026 Pyramids agreed a four-year deal with Ahmed Abdelkader, who had left Al Ahly for Al-Karma in January. Afsha's move to Al Ahly was the only one of these transfers made directly between the two clubs; the others were free transfers after a contract expired (Fathy, Ekramy) or signings from other clubs (El Said from Al-Ahli, Sobhi from Huddersfield Town, Maher from Zamalek, Abdelkader from Al-Karma). A fuller list of players who have appeared for both clubs is given below.

== Major matches ==
| Date | Competition | Home | Score | Away | Notes |
|---|---|---|---|---|---|
| 4 January 2019 | Egyptian Premier League | Pyramids | 2–1 | Al Ahly | Pyramids' first season under the new name |
| 6 February 2020 | Egyptian Premier League | Pyramids | 1–2 | Al Ahly | Al Ahly win away |
| 2 January 2023 | Egyptian Premier League | Al Ahly | 3–0 | Pyramids | Amr El Solia scored twice |
| 5 May 2023 | Egyptian Super Cup | Pyramids | 0–1 | Al Ahly | Pyramids finished runners-up |
| 23 July 2023 | Egyptian Premier League | Pyramids | 3–0 | Al Ahly | Ended Al Ahly's unbeaten league season |
| 12 July 2024 | Egyptian Premier League | Al Ahly | 3–2 | Pyramids | Wessam Abou Ali scored twice |
| 22 July 2024 | Egyptian Premier League | Pyramids | 0–1 | Al Ahly | Second meeting in ten days |
| 26 January 2025 | Egyptian Premier League | Al Ahly | 2–2 | Pyramids | Draw |
| 12 April 2025 | Egyptian Premier League | Pyramids | 1–1 | Al Ahly | Draw |
| 30 August 2025 | Egyptian Premier League | Al Ahly | 0–2 | Pyramids | Walid El Karti scored twice |
| 27 April 2026 | Egyptian Premier League, championship round | Pyramids | 3–0 | Al Ahly | Fiston Mayele scored twice; VAR ruled out an Al Ahly goal |

== Head-to-head record ==
as of November 2026, before the league match scheduled for 23 November 2026, the clubs had played 25 times in all competitions. Statistics sites differ by a match or two depending on which fixtures they count.

| Al Ahly wins | Draws | Pyramids wins | Matches |
|---|---|---|---|
| 11 | 6 | 8 | 25 |

Al Ahly's largest win is 5–0 in 2014–15. Pyramids' largest wins are the 3–0 results of July 2023 and April 2026; Al Ahly also won 3–0 in March 2022 and January 2023.

== The Meetings ==
=== Key ===
Colors

Al Ahly win
Draw
Pyramids win

=== Egyptian Premier League ===
These are the meetings in the Egyptian Premier League

| Season | Round | Home team | Score | Away team |
|---|---|---|---|---|
| 2014–15 | First leg | Al Assiouty Sport | 0–0 | Al Ahly |
| 2014–15 | Second leg | Al Ahly | 5–0 | Al Assiouty Sport |
| 2017–18 | First leg | Al Ahly | 1–0 | Al Assiouty Sport |
| 2017–18 | Second leg | Al Assiouty Sport | 0–1 | Al Ahly |
| 2018–19 | First leg | Pyramids | 2–1 | Al Ahly |
| 2018–19 | Second leg | Al Ahly | 0–1 | Pyramids |
| 2019–20 | First leg | Pyramids | 1–2 | Al Ahly |
| 2019–20 | Second leg | Al Ahly | 0–0 | Pyramids |
| 2020–21 | First leg | Pyramids | 0–0 | Al Ahly |
| 2020–21 | Second leg | Al Ahly | 2–2 | Pyramids |
| 2021–22 | First leg | Al Ahly | 3–0 | Pyramids |
| 2021–22 | Second leg | Pyramids | 2–0 | Al Ahly |
| 2022–23 | First leg | Al Ahly | 3–0 | Pyramids |
| 2022–23 | Second leg | Pyramids | 3–0 | Al Ahly |
| 2023–24 | First leg | Al Ahly | 3–2 | Pyramids |
| 2023–24 | Second leg | Pyramids | 0–1 | Al Ahly |
| 2024–25 | Regular season | Al Ahly | 2–2 | Pyramids |
| 2024–25 | Championship round | Pyramids | 1–1 | Al Ahly |
| 2025–26 | Regular season | Al Ahly | 0–2 | Pyramids |
| 2025–26 | Championship round | Pyramids | 3–0 | Al Ahly |

| Al Ahly wins | Draws | Pyramids wins |
|---|---|---|
| 8 | 6 | 6 |

=== Egypt Cup ===
These are the meetings in the Egypt Cup

| Season | Round | Home team | Score | Away team |
|---|---|---|---|---|
| 2017–18 | Quarter-finals | Al Ahly | 0–1 | Al Assiouty Sport |
| 2018–19 | Round of 16 | Al Ahly | 0–1 | Pyramids |
| 2020–21 | Quarter-finals | Al Ahly | 2–1 | Pyramids |
| 2021–22 | Final | Al Ahly | 2–1 | Pyramids |

| Al Ahly wins | Draws | Pyramids wins |
|---|---|---|
| 2 | 0 | 2 |

=== Egyptian Super Cup ===
These are the meetings in the Egyptian Super Cup

| Season | Round | Home team | Score | Away team |
|---|---|---|---|---|
| 2023 | Final | Pyramids | 0–1 | Al Ahly |

| Al Ahly wins | Draws | Pyramids wins |
|---|---|---|
| 1 | 0 | 0 |

=== All-time results ===
| Matches | Al Ahly wins | Draws | Pyramids wins |
|---|---|---|---|
| 25 | 11 | 6 | 8 |

== Records ==
=== Top scorers ===
Goals in all competitions, as of November 2026.

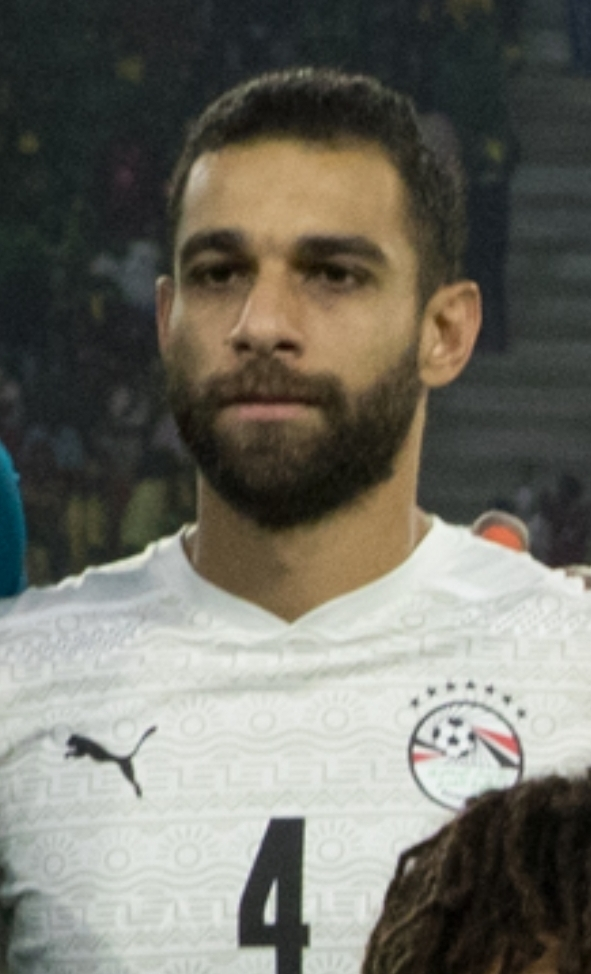
Amr El Solia, one of the joint top scorers in the Al Ahly–Pyramids rivalry.

| Player | Club | Goals |
|---|---|---|
| (Palestine) Wessam Abou Ali | Al Ahly | 3 |
| (Egypt) Amr El Solia | Al Ahly | 3 |
| (Egypt) Abdallah El Said | Pyramids (2); Al Ahly (1) | 3 |
| (Burkina Faso) Eric Traoré | Pyramids | 3 |
| (Democratic Republic of the Congo) Fiston Mayele | Pyramids | 3 |
| (Egypt) Walid El Karti | Pyramids | 3 |

== Honours ==
As of 20 May 2026

- Numbers with this background denote the competition record.

| Al Ahly | Competition | Pyramids |
|---|---|---|
Domestic
| 45 | Egyptian Premier League | 0 |
| 39 | Egypt Cup | 2 |
| 16 | Egyptian Super Cup | 0 |
| 7 | Sultan Hussein Cup (defunct) | 0 |
| 16 | Cairo League (defunct) | 0 |
| 1 | United Arab Republic Cup (defunct) | 0 |
| 1 | Egyptian Confederation Cup (defunct) | 0 |
| 125 | Aggregate | 2 |
African and Worldwide
| 12 | CAF Champions League | 1 |
| 1 | CAF Confederation Cup | 0 |
| 8 | CAF Super Cup | 1 |
| 1 | FIFA African-Asian-Pacific Cup | 1 |
| 1 | Afro-Asian Club Championship (defunct) | 0 |
| 4 | African Cup Winners' Cup (defunct) | 0 |
| 27 | Aggregate | 3 |
UAFA and Regional competitions
| 1 | Arab Club Champions Cup | 0 |
| 1 | Arab Cup Winners' Cup (defunct) | 0 |
| 2 | Arab Super Cup (defunct) | 0 |
| 4 | Aggregate | 0 |
| 156 | Total Aggregate | 5 |

=== League finishes ===
| Season | Al Ahly | Pyramids |
|---|---|---|
| 2021–22 | 3rd | 2nd |
| 2022–23 | 1st | 2nd |
| 2023–24 | 1st | 2nd |
| 2024–25 | 1st | 2nd |
| 2025–26 | 3rd | 2nd |

== Players who have played for both clubs ==
=== Al Ahly then Pyramids ===
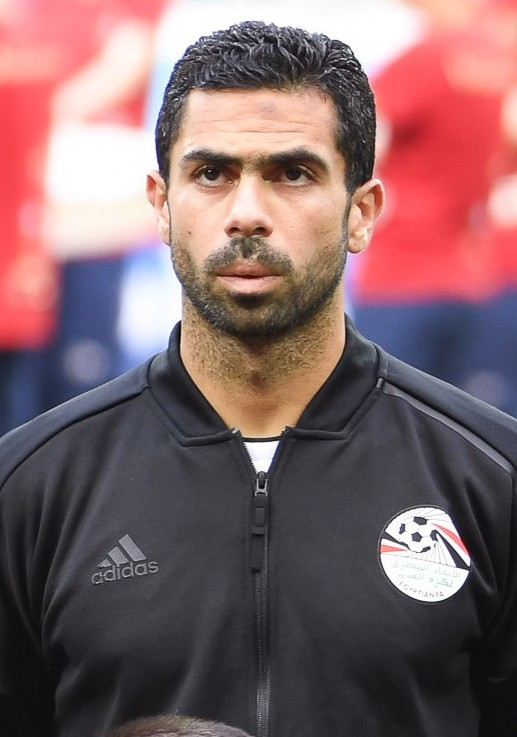
Ahmed Fathy, who represented both clubs

| Name | Position | Al Ahly | Pyramids |
| Name | Position | Career | Career |
|---|---|---|---|
| (Palestine) Ramzi Saleh | GK | 2008–2010 | 2014–2015 |
| (Egypt) Omar Bassam | FW | 2013–2014 | 2017–2018 |
| (Egypt) Shehab El-Din Ahmed | MF | 2008–2014 | 2018 |
| (Egypt) Mohamed Farouk | FW | 2014–2015 | 2018–2021 |
| (Egypt) Mohamed Hamdy | DF | 2014–2016 | 2018– |
| (Egypt) Abdallah El Said | MF | 2011–2018 | 2019–2024 |
| (Ghana) John Antwi | FW | 2015–2017 | 2019–2021 |
| (Egypt) Ahmed Hamoudi | MF | 2017–2019 | 2019–2021 |
| (Egypt) Sabri Raheel | DF | 2013–2019 | 2019 |
| (Egypt) Ahmed Fathy | DF | 2007–2014; 2015–2020 | 2020–2024 |
| (Egypt) Sherif Ekramy | GK | 2003–2005; 2010–2020 | 2020–2026 |
| (Egypt) Ramadan Sobhi | FW | 2014–2016; 2019–2020 | 2020–2026 |
| (Egypt) Ahmed El Sheikh | FW | 2015–2020 | 2020–2021 |
| (Egypt) Hesham Mohamed | MF | 2007–2012; 2017–2019 | 2021–2023 |
| (Egypt) Hussein El Sayed | DF | 2009–2011; 2015–2020 | 2021–2022 |
| (Egypt) Nasser Maher | MF | 2014–2021 | 2026– |
| (Egypt) Ahmed Abdelkader | FW | 2020–2026 | 2026– |
| (Egypt) Hazem Gamal | GK | 2024–2026 | 2026– |

=== Pyramids then Al Ahly ===
| Name | Position | Pyramids | Al Ahly |
| Name | Position | Career | Career |
|---|---|---|---|
| (Egypt) Afsha | MF | 2018–2019 | 2019– |
| (Egypt) Omar Kamal | DF | 2018 | 2024–2026 |

== Managers who have managed both clubs ==
=== Al Ahly then Pyramids ===
| Name | Al Ahly | Pyramids |
| Name | Career | Career |
|---|---|---|
| (Egypt) Abdelaziz Abdelshafy | 2010 (Caretaker manager), 2016 (Caretaker manager) | 2019 (Caretaker manager) |

== See also ==
- Cairo derby
