= 2022–23 Magyar Kupa =

Tournament details
- Country: Hungary
- Dates: 6 August 2022 – 3 May 2023
- Teams: 128 (Main round)

Final positions
- Champions: Zalaegerszeg (1st title)
- Runners-up: Budafok

Tournament statistics
- Top goal scorer(s): Péter Beke; Péter Horváth; Máté Lukács (6 goals each)

The 2022–23 Magyar Kupa (English: Hungarian Cup) was the 83rd season of Hungary's annual knock-out cup football competition. The title holders were Ferencváros by winning the 2022 Magyar Kupa final.

Match times up to 30 October 2022 and from 26 March 2023 were CEST (UTC+2). Times on interim ("winter") days were CET (UTC+1).

== First round ==
6 August 2022 First round	Fővárosi Vízművek (4)	2–2 (a.e.t.) (1–3 p)	(3) Füzesgyarmat	Budapest
10:00 CEST	Mamusits 67'; Zs. Kiss 75'	Report	Vasiljević 14'; Kis 28'	Stadium: Fővárosi Vízművek Sporttelep; Referee: Tamás Kovács

6 August 2022 First round	Balatonszepezd (5)	1–0	(4) Pápa	Balatonszepezd
10:00 CEST	Szokolai 76' (pen.)	Report	Ruzsás (red card) 80'	Stadium: Balatonszepezdi Sporttelep; Referee: Tibor Németh

6 August 2022 First round	Gázgyár (4)	4–1 (a.e.t.)	(3) Körösladány	Budapest
11:00 CEST	B. Tóth 86'; Scheiber 100'; Balogh 109' (pen.); Lovas 115'	Report	Illés 8'; Pusztai (red card) 19'; Wéber (red card) 90+2'	Stadium: ASR Gázgyár Sporttelep; Referee: Ákos Takács

6 August 2022 First round	Felsőzsolca (4)	1–0	(3) Bánk-Dalnoki	Felsőzsolca
13:00 CEST	Moroncsik 71' (pen.)	Report	Bokros (red card) 76'	Stadium: Felsőzsolca Sporttelep; Referee: Norbert Nagy

6 August 2022 First round	Gerjen (4)	1–7	(4) Lenti	Gerjen
15:00 CEST	Lacza 44'	Report	M. Nagy 13', 32'; Lukács 14' (pen.), 72', 84', 87'; D. Varga 65'	Stadium: Gerjeni SK Sporttelep; Referee: Márk Burzon

6 August 2022 First round	XV. Kerület (4)	3–2	(4) Nagybajom	Budapest
16:00 CEST	Kupás 21'; Kelemen 49', 90+3'	Report	Márton 56'; Ács-Gergely 65'	Stadium: Testvériség SE Sporttelep; Referee: Dávid Baranyai

6 August 2022 First round	Cigánd (4)	2–0	(4) Tállya	Cigánd
16:30 CEST	D. Nagy 54'; Katona 90+1' (pen.)	Report		Stadium: Városi Stadion; Referee: Csaba Sándor

6 August 2022 First round	Ibrány (4)	0–0 (a.e.t.) (3–4 p)	(4) Mátészalka	Ibrány
16:30 CEST		Report		Stadium: Ibrány Sporttelep; Referee: Mihály Török

6 August 2022 First round	Encs (4)	2–3 (a.e.t.)	(3) Eger	Encs
16:30 CEST	Horváth 62'; Zsiga 95'	Report	Bánki 77'; Jónyer 103'; Simon 108'	Stadium: Encs Városi Sportközpont; Referee: Péter Szabó

6 August 2022 First round	Berkenye (4)	1–4	(3) Tiszaújváros	Berkenye
16:30 CEST	Mátyás 52'	Report	D. Nagy 36'; B. Kiss 39'; P. Nagy 83'; Gelsi 90+1' (pen.)	Stadium: Berkenye SE Sporttelep; Referee: Péter Gál

6 August 2022 First round	Nagyecsed (4)	0–1	(3) Balassagyarmat	Nagyecsed
16:30 CEST		Report	Márton 38'	Stadium: Nagyecsed RSE Sporttelep; Referee: Tamás Takács

6 August 2022 First round	Salgótarján (4)	1–3	(3) Debreceni EAC	Salgótarján
16:30 CEST	Csifó 29'	Report	Kerekes 2' (pen.), 39'; Trencsényi 90+2'	Stadium: Szojka Ferenc Stadion; Referee: Gergő Muhari

6 August 2022 First round	Bag (5)	2–4	(3) Tiszafüred	Bag
16:30 CEST	H. Tóth 77', 90+2'	Report	Baranyi 27'; Skulka 43', 90'; Barzsó 88'	Stadium: Bagi Sporttelep; Referee: Marcell Sveda

6 August 2022 First round	Monostorpályi (4)	2–1	(4) Sajóbábony	Monostorpályi
16:30 CEST	Rostás 46'; Kolompár 58'	Report	I. Tóth 45'	Stadium: Vágó András Sporttelep; Referee: László Kormány

6 August 2022 First round	Kisújszállás (4)	0–2	(4) Szegedi VSE	Kisújszállás
16:30 CEST		Report	Papp 27'; Oroszi 74'	Stadium: Kisújszállási SE Sporttelep; Referee: Máté Kovács

6 August 2022 First round	Szolnok (3)	1–0	(3) Makó	Szolnok
16:30 CEST	Iván 36'; Tömösvári (red card) 90+1'	Report	Széll (red card) 90+1'	Stadium: Tiszaligeti Stadion; Referee: Tibor Farkas

6 August 2022 First round	Rákosmente (4)	1–4	(3) Jászberény	Budapest
16:30 CEST	Szokoli 10'	Report	Remili 6', 15'; Perevuznik 63'; Borics 89'	Stadium: RKSK Sportpálya; Referee: András Gáspár

6 August 2022 First round	Mezőkovácsháza (5)	1–5	(4) Dunakeszi	Mezőkovácsháza
16:30 CEST	Lakatos 50'	Report	Balogh 11', 65'; Cseri 15' (pen.); Kacsó 25'; Csordás 89'	Stadium: Sári Ferenc Sportközpont; Referee: Dániel Bálint

6 August 2022 First round	Tiszaföldvár (4)	0–6	(3) ESMTK	Tiszaföldvár
16:30 CEST	Kriska (red card) 85'	Report	Wirth 11', 19', 63'; Molnár 49' (pen.), 88'; Boda 90+1'	Stadium: Tiszaföldvári VSE Sportpálya; Referee: Patrik Fehérvári

6 August 2022 First round	Pécel (5)	0–2	(3) Dabas	Pécel
16:30 CEST		Report	D. Szabó 36'; Lettner 56'	Stadium: Péceli Sporttelep; Referee: János Dobai

6 August 2022 First round	Mezőmegyer (5)	2–3	(4) Rákospalota	Mezőmegyer
16:30 CEST	Balog 19' (pen.); Lehoczki 43' (pen.)	Report	Pölöskei 49', 84'; Gulyás 90+1'	Stadium: Mezőmegyeri Sporttelep; Referee: Tibor Fekete

6 August 2022 First round	Lajosmizse (4)	2–0	(4) Törökszentmiklós	Lajosmizse
16:30 CEST	L. Kiss 15'; Móra 67'	Report		Stadium: Lázár Bence Sportcentrum; Referee: Gergely Németh

6 August 2022 First round	Sárvár (4)	1–5	(4) Nyergesújfalu	Sárvár
16:30 CEST	Takács 78'	Report	Binder 18' (o.g.); Hajnal 34' (pen.); Vass 42', 88'; Vida 69' (pen.)	Stadium: Sárvár FC Sporttelep; Referee: Attila Kocsis

6 August 2022 First round	Hegyeshalom (5)	0–5	(3) III. Kerület	Hegyeshalom
16:30 CEST		Report	Kokenszky 44'; Pócsik 56'; Erdős 62'; Szalai 77'; Barczi 87'	Stadium: Hegyeshalmi SC Sporttelep; Referee: Árpád Jakab

6 August 2022 First round	Andráshida (4)	2–6	(3) Bicske	Andráshida
16:30 CEST	Nagy-Palócz 4'; Fülöp 67'	Report	Németh 3', 90+2'; Ábrahám 18' (o.g.); Sóron 53', 61', 70' (pen.)	Stadium: Andráshida SC Sporttelep; Referee: Benjamin Nyekita

6 August 2022 First round	Tatai (4)	6–1	(4) Pét	Tata
16:30 CEST	Kisék 3'; Martonfi 39'; Kiprich 55' (pen.); Széles 79'; Á. Tóth 87'; Györgykovács 90+4'	Report	Pálfi 71'	Stadium: Új úti Sporttelep; Referee: Tamás Apkó

6 August 2022 First round	Hegykő (4)	0–7	(3) Tatabánya	Hegykő
16:30 CEST		Report	Forró 51'; Letenyei 54'; Kocsis 55', 61', 63'; Márton 74'; Gacs 80'	Stadium: Hegykő Sporttelep; Referee: Ádám Papp

6 August 2022 First round	Ercsi Kinizsi (4)	1–2	(3) Kaposvár	Ercsi
16:30 CEST	Jerzsabek 49'	Report	Kálmán 45'; Harsányi 51'	Stadium: Ercsi Kinizsi Sporttelep; Referee: Tamás Sipos

6 August 2022 First round	Kadarkút (4)	3–1	(4) Komlói Bányász	Kadarkút
16:30 CEST	Iván 47', 68'; Pandur 57'	Report	Jégl 88'	Stadium: Kadarkút SK Sporttelep; Referee: Attila Éreth

6 August 2022 First round	Balatonlelle (4)	0–1	(3) Iváncsa	Balatonlelle
16:30 CEST		Report	Juhász 61'	Stadium: Balatonlellei SE Sporttelep; Referee: Tamás Berényi

6 August 2022 First round	Nagyatád (4)	1–0	(4) Főnix	Nagyatád
16:30 CEST	Basics 13'; Koósz (red card) 90+3'	Report	Juhász 61'	Stadium: Mudin Imre Sportcentrum; Referee: Roland Farkas

6 August 2022 First round	Dunaújváros (3)	5–2	(3) BKV Előre	Dunaújváros
16:30 CEST	Hesz 5'; Székely 25'; Novák 62'; N. Szabó 67' (o.g.); Jakab 70'; Irimiás (red card) 73'	Report	P. Szabó 59' (pen.); Forgács 83'	Stadium: Dunaferr Arena; Referee: Gergely Bana

6 August 2022 First round	Vajta (6)	0–3	(5) Ócsárd	Vajta
16:30 CEST		Report	Miglinczi 18'; Pretzl 61', 85'	Stadium: Vajta Sporttelep; Referee: Péter Kovács

6 August 2022 First round	Semjénháza (4)	0–1	(3) Budaörs	Semjénháza
16:30 CEST		Report	Gula 56'	Stadium: Semjénháza Sporttelep; Referee: Flórián Holczbauer

6 August 2022 First round	Mohács (4)	0–3	(3) Szekszárd	Mohács
16:30 CEST		Report	D. Tóth 23'; Csernik 73'; Fekete 84' (pen.)	Stadium: Újvárosi Stadion; Referee: Gábor Iványi

6 August 2022 First round	Bölcske (4)	2–1	(3) Érd	Bölcske
16:30 CEST	Hanol 37'; P. Kiss 85' (pen.)	Report	Pintér 44' (pen.); Pál (red card) 77'	Stadium: Bölcskei SE Sporttelep; Referee: Zoltán Maml

6 August 2022 First round	Király (4)	2–0	(3) Veszprém	Szombathely
18:00 CEST	Halmosi 19'; Velekei 73'	Report		Stadium: Király Sportlétesítmény; Referee: Máté Horváth

6 August 2022 First round	Pomáz (5)	2–2 (a.e.t.) (6–7 p)	(4) Abda	Pomáz
18:00 CEST	Bencze 28'; Szenczi 37'	Report	Kerékgyártó 8'; Wágenhoffer 90+3'	Stadium: Pomáz SE Sporttelep; Referee: Roland Cseh

6 August 2022 First round	Mátraderecske (5)	3–0	(4) Vác	Mátraderecske
18:00 CEST		Report		Stadium: Mátraderecskei Sporttelep

7 August 2022 First round	Gárdony (4)	2–3	(3) Nagykanizsa	Agárd
11:00 CEST	Gere 49'; Bezerédi 74'	Report	Szökrönyös 9'; Török 20'; Aszalos 48'	Stadium: Parkerdő Sporttelep; Referee: Szabolcs Kakuk

7 August 2022 First round	Monor (3)	1–0 (a.e.t.)	(3) Cegléd	Monor
16:00 CEST	Hulicsár 101'	Report		Stadium: Balassi Bálint utcai Stadion; Referee: Tamás Tóth

7 August 2022 First round	Létavértes (4)	0–5	(3) Hatvan	Létavértes
16:30 CEST	Kolompár (red card) 46'	Report	Tajti 22'; Karácsony 47' (pen.); Sármány 65', 84'; Kitl 89'	Stadium: Létavértesi Sportcentrum; Referee: Gábor Vinter

7 August 2022 First round	Nagydobos (5)	0–5	(4) Újfehértó	Nagydobos
16:30 CEST	B. Szabó (red card) 39'	Report	Szilágyi 12', 25'; Simonka 42'; Varga 45'; Papp 87'	Stadium: Nagydobos Sporttelep; Referee: Krisztián Csiszár

7 August 2022 First round	Karancslapujtő (4)	6–0	(4) Balkány	Karancslapujtő
16:30 CEST	Stark 8'; Sándor 27' (pen.); Novák 28', 76'; Zsély 64'; Puporka 86'	Report		Stadium: KSE Karancslapujtő Sporttelep; Referee: Dávid Práth

7 August 2022 First round	Putnok (3)	2–0	(3) Sényő	Putnok
16:30 CEST	Galacs 35'; Katona 79'	Report	Jócsák (red card) 45'	Stadium: Várady Béla Sportközpont; Referee: Márk Szigetvári

7 August 2022 First round	Kalocsa (4)	1–0	(4) Testvériség	Kalocsa
16:30 CEST	L. Tóth 90+5'	Report		Stadium: Molnár Ferenc Sportközpont; Referee: Attila Bálint

7 August 2022 First round	Kiskunfélegyháza (4)	0–5	(3) Hódmezővásárhely	Kiskunfélegyháza
16:30 CEST		Report	Barta 16', 86'; Kenderesi 18', 59'; Erhardt 63'	Stadium: Honvéd Sporttelep; Referee: Vilmos Hartung

7 August 2022 First round	Bugyi (4)	1–0	(4) Kecskeméti LC	Bugyi
16:30 CEST	Szmola 1'	Report		Stadium: Bugyi SE Sporttelep; Referee: Ákos Takács

7 August 2022 First round	Dabas-Gyón (6)	1–4	(5) Székkutas	Dabas
16:30 CEST	Merkovics 90+2'	Report	Papp 20', 42', 55'; Czövek 82'	Stadium: Dabas-Gyón FC Sporttelep; Referee: Róbert Tóth

7 August 2022 First round	Kecel (4)	0–1	(4) Deszk	Kecel
16:30 CEST		Report	Fóris 11'	Stadium: Kecel Sporttelep; Referee: Simon Szántó

7 August 2022 First round	Rábapaty (4)	1–3	(3) Komárom	Rábapaty
16:30 CEST	Dugovics 18'	Report	Szecsődi 21'; Jóna 58'; Nagy 81' (pen.)	Stadium: Rábapatyi Sporttelep; Referee: Réka Molnár

7 August 2022 First round	Ugod (5)	1–5	(5) Mezőörs	Ugod
16:30 CEST	Sári 25' (pen.)	Report	Kreicz 21', 76', 78'; Maruzs 51'; Fodor 65'	Stadium: Ugod SE Sporttelep; Referee: Bálint Farsang

7 August 2022 First round	Teskánd (3)	0–7	(3) BVSC Budapest	Teskánd
16:30 CEST	Sári 25' (pen.)	Report	Horváth 3'; Tamási 17' (pen.); Tóth 38'; Ciceu 57'; Balogh 65'; Reizinger 70'; Nádor 88'	Stadium: Teskándi Sporttelep; Referee: Attila Szommer

7 August 2022 First round	Ménfőcsanak (4)	0–2	(3) Balatonfüred	Győr
16:30 CEST		Report	Szabó 4'; Tóth 36'	Stadium: Ménfőcsanak Sporttelep; Referee: Dávid Juhász

7 August 2022 First round	Körmend (5)	0–8	(3) Zsámbék	Körmend
16:30 CEST		Report	Kerék 28', 40', 53', 80'; Csóri 38'; Sárközi 58'; Haupt 76', 87'	Stadium: Körmendi FC Sporttelep; Referee: Bálint Juhász

7 August 2022 First round	Úrkút (4)	2–0	(4) SC Sopron	Úrkút
16:30 CEST	Papp 39'; Kovács 71'	Report		Stadium: Úrkút Sporttelep; Referee: Barnabás Drabon

7 August 2022 First round	Söpte (4)	4–1	(4) Devecser	Söpte
16:30 CEST	Mester 9'; Hujber 13', 28', 68'; Németh (red card) 61'	Report	Hauser 88'; Móger (red card) 77'	Stadium: Söpte Sporttelep; Referee: Olivér Dombi

7 August 2022 First round	Rábaszentandrás (5)	0–3	(4) Zalaszentgrót	Rábaszentandrás
16:30 CEST		Report	Ferenczi 24'; Gájer 56'; Penczák 78'	Stadium: Rábaszentandrási SE Sporttelep; Referee: György Boda

7 August 2022 First round	Sárosd (4)	1–2	(4) Dunaharaszti	Sárosd
16:30 CEST	E. Szabó 84'	Report	Novák 22', 58'	Stadium: Sárosdi Sporttelep; Referee: Ádám Magyar

7 August 2022 First round	Pécsi VSK (4)	2–0	(4) Szepetnek	Pécs
16:30 CEST	Fiáth 6'; Gergye 53'	Report		Stadium: PVSK Sportkomplexum; Referee: József Erdelecz

7 August 2022 First round	Bonyhád (4)	2–2 (a.e.t.) (3–4 p)	(4) 43. Sz. Építők	Bonyhád
16:30 CEST	Ágics 19'; Erdélyi 77'; Szabó (red card) 26'	Report	Pálmai 47'; Rőthy 58'	Stadium: Bonyhád VLC Sporttelep; Referee: Márk Kondákor

7 August 2022 First round	Pécsvárad (4)	1–0	(3) Kelen	Pécsvárad
16:30 CEST	Koronics 61' (pen.)	Report		Stadium: Dr.Kófiás Mihály Városi Sporttelep; Referee: Patrik Fehérvári

7 August 2022 First round	Edelény (5)	3–1	(3) Hajdúszoboszló	Edelény
16:30 CEST	Mészáros 44' (pen.); Nadanicsek 72'; Boros 88'	Report	Karika 17'	Stadium: Edelény Városi Sporttelep; Referee: Tibor Valu

7 August 2022 First round	Balmazújváros (4)	1–2	(4) Hidasnémeti	Balmazújváros
16:30 CEST	Silling 73'	Report	Bucsák 18', 90+3'	Stadium: Balmazújvárosi Városi Sportpálya; Referee: Dávid Hajdú

== Second round ==
27 August 2022 Second round	Debreceni EAC (3)	2–0 (a.e.t.)	(3) Eger	Debrecen
16:00 CEST	Kerekes 96'; Bidzilya 101'	Report	Kovács (red card) 120'	Stadium: DEAC Stadion; Referee: Tamás Újhelyi

27 August 2022 Second round	Mátraderecske (5)	1–7	(3) Putnok	Mátraderecske
16:00 CEST	Oláh 53'	Report	Katona 3' (pen.), 18', 41', 58'; Veress 43'; Fülöp 49'; Sramkó 77'	Stadium: Mátraderecskei Sporttelep; Referee: Tamás Nazsa

27 August 2022 Second round	Monostorpályi (4)	3–1	(3) Tiszaújváros	Monostorpályi
16:30 CEST	Kolompár 36'; Rostás 85', 88'	Report	Páll 63'	Stadium: Vágó András Sporttelep; Referee: Tibor Valu

27 August 2022 Second round	Karancslapujtő (4)	0–5	(3) Hatvan	Karancslapujtő
16:30 CEST	Puporka (red card) 34'; Stark (red card) 35'; Pingiczer (red card) 35'; Sándor (red card) 35'; Zsély (red card) 72'	Report	Karácsony 8', 57'; Dinka 16', 31', 49'	Stadium: KSE Karancslapujtő Sporttelep; Referee: Dávid Juhász

27 August 2022 Second round	Mátészalka (4)	2–0	(4) Hidasnémeti	Mátészalka
16:30 CEST	Sárosi 54'; Drabik 90+3'	Report	Hirjak (red card) 47'	Stadium: Mátészalkai Városi Sporttelep; Referee: Péter Szabó

27 August 2022 Second round	Szegedi VSE (4)	5–1	(4) Bugyi	Szeged
16:30 CEST	Beretka 18'; Oroszi 45'; Kelemen 49'; Ábrahám-Fúrús 65', 73'	Report	Králik 69' (pen.)	Stadium: Szegedi VSE Sporttelep; Referee: Patrik Fehérvári

27 August 2022 Second round	Füzesgyarmat (3)	1–0 (a.e.t.)	(3) Hódmezővásárhely	Füzesgyarmat
16:30 CEST	B. Szabó 98'	Report		Stadium: Lázár Gyula Városi Sporttelep; Referee: Róbert Nagy

27 August 2022 Second round	Lajosmizse (4)	0–5	(3) Dabas	Lajosmizse
16:30 CEST		Report	Lettner 17', 46'; L. Szabó 22'; Sziklási 49'; D. Szabó 90+1'	Stadium: Lázár Bence Sportcentrum; Referee: Bottyán Borbás

27 August 2022 Second round	Székkutas (5)	0–7	(3) Monor	Székkutas
16:30 CEST	Rácz (red card) 73'	Report	Hulicsár 7', 17'; D. Kovács 12', 15'; Urbin 60'; Ambrus 83'; Haragos 85'	Stadium: Székkutasi Sportcentrum; Referee: Vilmos Hartung

27 August 2022 Second round	Tatabánya (3)	0–1	(3) Balatonfüred	Tatabánya
16:30 CEST		Report	Róth 86'	Stadium: Grosics Gyula Stadion; Referee: Zoltán J. Kovács

27 August 2022 Second round	Balatonszepezd (5)	0–2	(3) Komárom	Balatonszepezd
16:30 CEST		Report	Schiller 18'; Z. Nagy 79'	Stadium: Balatonszepezdi Sporttelep; Referee: Bálint Juhász

27 August 2022 Second round	Mezőörs (5)	4–2	(4) Söpte	Mezőörs
16:30 CEST	Kreicz 3', 21'; Maruzs 55'; Burányi 80'	Report	Mester 36'; Hujber 64' (pen.)	Stadium: Mezőörs KSE Sporttelep; Referee: András Gáspár

27 August 2022 Second round	Nyergesújfalu (4)	2–0	(4) Tata	Nyergesújfalu
16:30 CEST	Molnár 28'; Manga 90+2'; Vass (red card) 89'	Report		Stadium: Hajnal Tamás Sportcentrum; Referee: Ádám Papp

27 August 2022 Second round	Zsámbék (3)	0–3	(3) Bicske	Zsámbék
16:30 CEST		Report	Sóron 34' (pen.); Bozsoki 40'; L. Varga 67'	Stadium: Zsámbéki SK Sporttelep; Referee: Ákos Gaál

27 August 2022 Second round	Dunaharaszti (4)	1–3	(4) Bölcske	Dunaharaszti
16:30 CEST	Novák 56'	Report	Farsang 26'; Süvöltös 30'; Miholics 90+3'; Benke (red card) 81'	Stadium: Dunaharaszti MTK Sporttelep; Referee: János Dobai

27 August 2022 Second round	Szekszárd (3)	2–0	(3) Budaörs	Szekszárd
16:30 CEST	Csernik 30'; Horog 84'	Report		Stadium: Szekszárdi Városi Sport és Szabadidőközpont; Referee: Ádám Pillók

27 August 2022 Second round	Kadarkút (4)	0–7	(3) Iváncsa	Kadarkút
16:30 CEST		Report	Aradi 11'; Suszter 58', 68'; Maka 72', 86', 87'; Vallejos 89'	Stadium: Kadarkút SK Sporttelep; Referee: Zoltán Maml

27 August 2022 Second round	43. Sz. Építők (4)	0–3	(3) Nagykanizsa	Budapest
16:30 CEST		Report	Pleszkán 36'; Szilágyi 90+31'; Török 90+36'	Stadium: Hévízi úti Stadion; Referee: Patrik Horváth

27 August 2022 Second round	Pécsvárad (4)	3–1	(3) Dunaújváros	Budapest
16:30 CEST	Reith 52'; Szentes 53', 69'	Report	Jakab 90' (pen.)	Stadium: Dr. Kófiás Mihály Városi Sporttelep; Referee: Gábor Iványi

27 August 2022 Second round	Ócsárd (5)	0–6	(4) Nagyatád	Ócsárd
16:30 CEST		Report	Dekanics 8' (pen.), 16' (pen.); Jerković 32'; P. Horváth 42' (pen.), 46', 71'	Stadium: Ócsárd SE Sporttelep; Referee: András Virág

27 August 2022 Second round	Király (4)	0–3	(3) BVSC Budapest	Szombathely
18:00 CEST		Report	Szalánszki 16'; Szilágyi 35'; Reizinger 58'	Stadium: Király Sportlétesítmény; Referee: Tamás Móri

27 August 2022 Second round	Rákospalota (4)	0–2	(3) ESMTK	Budapest
19:00 CEST		Report	Soós 36'; L. Horváth 51'	Stadium: Budai II. László Stadion; Referee: Péter Gál

28 August 2022 Second round	Felőzsolca (4)	1–0	(4) Cigánd	Felsőzsolca
11:00 CEST	B. Varga 25'	Report	Á. Tóth (red card) 45'	Stadium: Felsőzsolca Sporttelep; Referee: Sándor Szilágyi

28 August 2022 Second round	Újfehértó (4)	0–2	(3) Tiszafüred	Téglás
16:00 CEST		Report	V. Szabó 64'; Skulka 90'	Stadium: Téglási Sportpálya; Referee: Tamás Tóth

28 August 2022 Second round	Edelény (5)	0–5	(3) Balassagyarmat	Edelény
16:30 CEST		Report	Géringer 32'; Bartos 42', 85'; Ferkel 50'; Márton 75'	Stadium: Edelény Városi Sporttelep; Referee: Gergő Muhari

28 August 2022 Second round	Deszk (4)	3–1	(4) Gázgyár	Deszk
16:30 CEST	Fóris 81', 85', 88'	Report	Balogh 62' (pen.)	Stadium: Deszk Sporttelep; Referee: Tamás Kovács

28 August 2022 Second round	Kalocsa (4)	0–2	(3) Jászberény	Kalocsa
16:30 CEST		Report	L. Varga 18'; Sz. Nagy 90+4'	Stadium: Molnár Ferenc Sport- és Szabadidőközpont; Referee: László Lovas

28 August 2022 Second round	Dunakeszi (4)	1–2	(3) Szolnok	Dunakeszi
16:30 CEST	B. Balogh 64'	Report	Iván 57'; Gohér 87'	Stadium: Dunakeszi Város Fóti úti Sportcentruma; Referee: Szabolcs Kakuk

28 August 2022 Second round	Úrkút (4)	1–4	(3) III. Kerület	Úrkút
16:30 CEST	Király 9'; Á. Horváth (red card) 60'	Report	Kokenszky 24', 49'; L. Tóth 36', 90+1'	Stadium: Úrkút Sporttelep; Referee: Gergely Bana

28 August 2022 Second round	Abda (4)	1–2	(4) Zalaszentgrót	Abda
16:30 CEST	Vígh 83'	Report	Éri 36' (o.g.); Ferenczi 48'	Stadium: Abda SC Sporttelep; Referee: Gábor Büki

28 August 2022 Second round	Pécsi VSK (4)	1–2	(3) Kaposvár	Pécs
16:30 CEST	Sztojka 48'	Report	Mayer 7'; Zólyomi 56'	Stadium: PVSK Sportkomplexum; Referee: Attila Szommer

28 August 2022 Second round	Lenti (4)	3–4 (a.e.t.)	(4) XV. Kerület	Lenti
16:30 CEST	Lukács 12', 104'; M. Nagy 77'	Report	Kupás 28' (pen.); M. Szabó 57'; Kindlik 105'; Kelemen 108'	Stadium: Lenti TE Sporttelep; Referee: Flórián Holczbauer

== Round of 64 ==
17 September 2022 Round of 64	Mátészalka (4)	1–6	(1) Újpest	Mátészalka
13:00 CEST	Sárosi 8'	Report	Csongvai 21'; Csoboth 24'; Gouré 41'; Bureković 62'; Ljujić 74'; Varga 82' (pen.)	Stadium: Mátészalkai Városi Sporttelep; Attendance: 2,000; Referee: Imre Kovács

17 September 2022 Round of 64	Szegedi VSE (4)	0–4	(2) Békéscsaba	Szeged
13:00 CEST	Rádai (red card) 70'	Report	Lukács 27' (pen.), 33', 90+1'; Czékus 39'; Máris (red card) 86'	Stadium: Szegedi VSE Sporttelep; Attendance: László Attila Nagy

17 September 2022 Round of 64	Dorog (2)	0–2	(1) Budapest Honvéd	Dorog
13:30 CEST		Report	Mitrović 3'; Samperio 15'	Stadium: Buzánszky Jenő Stadion; Attendance: 1,000; Referee: Ádám Pillók

17 September 2022 Round of 64	Nagykanizsa (3)	5–1	(3) Hatvan	Nagykanizsa
13:30 CEST	Lőrincz 11'; Kovalovszki 23'; Kondor 40', 71'; Kovács 90+2'	Report	Kitl 65'	Stadium: Olajbányász Sporttelep; Referee: Bálint Juhász

17 September 2022 Round of 64	Balassagyarmat (3)	1–2	(1) Vasas	Balassagyarmat
15:00 CEST	Bartos 28' (pen.)	Report	Ihrig-Farkas 13'; Novothny 86'	Stadium: Kövi Pál Sportközpont; Attendance: 700; Referee: Tamás Nazsa

17 September 2022 Round of 64	Kaposvár (3)	0–2	(1) Zalaegerszeg	Kaposvár
15:00 CEST		Report	Manzinga 54', 65'	Stadium: Rákóczi Stadion; Attendance: 500; Referee: Zoltán J. Kovács

17 September 2022 Round of 64	BVSC Budapest (3)	0–2	(1) Kisvárda	Budapest
15:00 CEST		Report	Lucas 26'; Vida 29'	Stadium: Szőnyi úti Stadion; Attendance: 200; Referee: Márton Rúsz

17 September 2022 Round of 64	Szekszárd (3)	0–3	(1) Mezőkövesd	Szekszárd
15:00 CEST		Report	Beširović 20'; Lukić 52'; Dražić 64'	Stadium: Városi Sport és Szabadidőközpont; Referee: Péter Zierkelbach

17 September 2022 Round of 64	Tiszafüred (3)	0–4	(2) Siófok	Tiszafüred
15:00 CEST		Report	Nikházi 11'; Farkas 49', 62'; Dénes 90'	Stadium: Lipcsey Elemér Sporttelep; Attendance: 500; Referee: Sándor Szilágyi

17 September 2022 Round of 64	Bölcske (4)	1–2	(2) Budafok	Bölcske
15:00 CEST (UTC+2)	Rompos 87'	Report	Hajdók 3' (o.g.); Beke 44'	Stadium: Bölcskei SE Sporttelep; Referee: Zoltán Maml

17 September 2022 Round of 64	Jászberény (3)	1–2	(3) Debreceni EAC	Jászberény
15:00 CEST	Szőllősi 47'	Report	Korhut 16'; Szabó 90+2'	Stadium: Városi Stadion; Attendance: 200; Referee: Máté Horváth

17 September 2022 Round of 64	Balatonfüred (3)	3–0	(3) Komárom	Balatonfüred
15:00 CEST	Lasz 17'; Imre 49'; Bene 78'	Report		Stadium: Balatonfüredi FC Sporttelep; Referee: Péter Gál

17 September 2022 Round of 64	Mezőörs (5)	0–4	(4) Felsőzsolca	Mezőörs
15:00 CEST	Hajba (red card) 71'	Report	Lippai 13'; Agárdy 46'; Varga 59'; Moroncsik 71' (pen.)	Stadium: Mezőörs KSE Sporttelep; Referee: Ádám Papp

17 September 2022 Round of 64	Zalaszentgrót (4)	2–3	(3) Monor	Zalaszentgrót
15:00 CEST	Horváth 50'; Fábián 79'	Report	Hulicsár 2'; Agóts 49'; Szabó 75'	Stadium: Zalaszentgróti Sporttelep; Referee: Vilmos Hartung

17 September 2022 Round of 64	Iváncsa (3)	3–2	(2) Gyirmót	Iváncsa
15:00 CEST	Medgyes 10' (o.g.); Suszter 37', 52'	Report	Nagy 68' (pen.), 75'	Stadium: Károlyi István Sporttelep; Attendance: 570; Referee: Tibor Horváth

17 September 2022 Round of 64	Nagyatád (4)	7–0	(4) Deszk	Nagyatád
15:00 CEST	Horváth 22', 30', 45'; Vrban 38'; Jerković 60', 80', 81'	Report		Stadium: Mudin Imre Sportcentrum; Referee: Gábor Iványi

17 September 2022 Round of 64	ESMTK (3)	1–0	(2) Soroksár	Budapest
15:00 CEST	Lucz 70'	Report		Stadium: ESMTK Stadion; Referee: László Lovas

17 September 2022 Round of 64	Pécsvárad (4)	0–4	(2) Győr	Pécsvárad
15:00 CEST		Report	Óvári 3'; Bencze 10'; Szujó 64'; Kovács 70'	Stadium: Dr. Kófiás Mihály Sporttelep; Referee: András Gáspár

17 September 2022 Round of 64	Füzesgyarmat (3)	1–2 (a.e.t.)	(2) Mosonmagyaróvár	Füzesgyarmat
15:00 CEST	Popescu 90+2' (red card) 118'	Report	Deak 12'; Sajbán 105'	Stadium: Lázár Gyula Sporttelep; Attendance: 150; Referee: Csaba Sándor

17 September 2022 Round of 64	Csákvár (2)	2–5	(1) Puskás Akadémia	Csákvár
16:00 CEST	Torvund 39'; Alaxai 73'	Report	Zahedi 24' (pen.), 33'; Slagveer 26'; Colley 79', 89'	Stadium: Tersztyánszky Ödön Sportközpont; Attendance: 300; Referee: Norbert Nagy

17 September 2022 Round of 64	Diósgyőr (2)	0–1	(2) Szeged GA	Miskolc
16:00 CEST		Report	Kundrák 14'	Stadium: DVTK Stadion; Attendance: 2,951; Referee: József Erdős

17 September 2022 Round of 64	Kozármisleny (3)	0–1	(2) Kazincbarcika	Kozármisleny
17:00 CEST		Report	Nagy 86'	Stadium: Kozármislenyi Stadion; Attendance: 250; Referee: Bottyán Borbás

17 September 2022 Round of 64	Ajka (2)	3–0	(2) Szentlőrinc	Ajka
17:00 CEST	Doncsecz 10', 29', 58'	Report		Stadium: Városi Sportcentrum; Attendance: 400; Referee: Márk Szigetvári

18 September 2022 Round of 64	Pécsi MFC (2)	0–1	(1) Paks	Pécs
13:00 CEST	Kesztyűs (red card) 82'	Report	Varga 63' (pen.)	Stadium: Stadion PMFC; Attendance: 1,500; Referee: Marcell Derdák

18 September 2022 Round of 64	Dabas (3)	0–1	(1) Debreceni VSC	Dabas
15:00 CEST		Report	Ferenczi 38'; Romanchuk (red card) 63'	Stadium: Wellis Sportpark; Attendance: 400; Referee: Tamás Takács

18 September 2022 Round of 64	Tiszakécske (2)	0–3	(1) Kecskeméti TE	Tiszakécske
15:00 CEST		Report	Pejović 48'; B. Tóth 67', 87'	Stadium: Városi Stadion; Attendance: 850; Referee: Tamás Berényi

18 September 2022 Round of 64	III. Kerület (3)	2–5	(1) Fehérvár	Budapest
15:00 CEST	Opavszky 2'; Elek 56'	Report	Kodro 43'; Stopira 59'; Heister 63'; Bumba 71'; Makarenko 88'	Stadium: Hévízi úti Stadion; Referee: Attila Molnár

18 September 2022 Round of 64	Monostorpályi (4)	0–2	(2) Nyíregyháza	Monostorpályi
15:00 CEST		Report	Szerető 63'; Pantović 74' (pen.)	Stadium: Vágó András Sporttelep; Attendance: 800; Referee: Tamás Újhelyi

18 September 2022 Round of 64	Nyergesújfalu (4)	1–0	(3) Szolnok	Nyergesújfalu
15:00 CEST	Hajnal 53' (pen.)	Report	Gohér (red card) 52'	Stadium: Hajnal Tamás Sportcentrum; Referee: Gergő Muhari

18 September 2022 Round of 64	Putnok (3)	2–4	(2) Szombathelyi Haladás	Putnok
15:00 CEST	Nagy 36', 39'	Report	Rácz 31'; Doktorics 42'; Taipi 58'; Borvető 82'	Stadium: Várady Béla Sportközpont; Referee: József Ducsai

18 September 2022 Round of 64	Bicske (3)	0–2	(1) Ferencváros	Bicske
16:00 CEST		Report	Gojak 46'; Vécsei 87'	Stadium: Bicskei TC Sporttelep; Referee: Péter Antal

18 September 2022 Round of 64	XV. Kerület (4)	0–8	(2) MTK Budapest	Budapest
18:00 CEST		Report	Németh 8'; Futács 17', 27'; Szépe 23'; Kovácsréti 48', 84'; Zuigéber 52'; Zsóri 72' (pen.)	Stadium: Budai II. László Stadion; Attendance: 712; Referee: Tamás Tóth

== Round of 32 ==
18 October 2022 Round of 32	Nyíregyháza (2)	1–2	(1) Vasas	Sényő
13:30 CEST	Gresó 60'	Report	Zimonyi 42'; Otigba 81'	Stadium: Sényő FC Sporttelep; Attendance: 344; Referee: Imre Kovács

18 October 2022 Round of 32	Győr (2)	1–0	(1) Kecskeméti TE	Győr
17:00 CEST	Kiss 39'	Report		Stadium: ETO Park; Attendance: on closed Referee: Csaba Pintér

19 October 2022 Round of 32	Iváncsa (3)	3–2 (a.e.t.)	(1) Ferencváros	Iváncsa
13:00 CEST	Suszter 6'; Aradi 57'; Kercsó 96'	Report	Zachariassen 4'; R. Mmaee 19'	Stadium: Károlyi István Sporttelep; Attendance: 1,000; Referee: Marcell Derdák

19 October 2022 Round of 32	Mosonmagyaróvár (2)	0–3	(1) Kisvárda	Mosonmagyaróvár
13:30 CEST		Report	Melnyk 45'; Navrátil 49'; Ilievski 62'	Stadium: MTE Sporttelep; Attendance: 400; Referee: Tibor Horváth

19 October 2022 Round of 32	Felsőzsolca (4)	0–6	(2) MTK Budapest	Felsőzsolca
13:30 CEST		Report	Zuigéber 28', 78', 83', 87'; Godwords 54'; Szépe 90'	Stadium: Felsőzsolca Sporttelep; Attendance: 600; Referee: József Ducsai

19 October 2022 Round of 32	Debreceni EAC (3)	0–4	(1) Debreceni VSC	Debrecen
13:30 CEST		Report	Sós 25'; Horváth 39'; Major 46'; Olawale 51'; Drešković (red card) 64'	Stadium: DEAC Stadion; Attendance: 1,000; Referee: László Lovas

19 October 2022 Round of 32	Nagykanizsa (3)	1–4	(2) Békéscsaba	Nagykanizsa
13:30 CEST	Lőrincz 65' (pen.)	Report	Hamed 22'; Kitl 77' (pen.); Váradi 87'; Czékus 90+4'	Stadium: Olajbányász Stadion; Attendance: 400; Referee: Gergely Bana

19 October 2022 Round of 32	Balatonfüred (3)	0–3	(1) Paks	Balatonfüred
13:30 CEST		Report	Haraszti 13' (pen.); Papp 78'; Burucz 80' (o.g.)	Stadium: Városi Sporttelep; Referee: Ákos Gaál

19 October 2022 Round of 32	Budafok (2)	1–0 (a.e.t.)	(2) Szeged	Budapest
13:30 CEST	Soltész 120'	Report		Stadium: Promontor utcai Stadion; Attendance: 300; Referee: Bence Hanyecz

19 October 2022 Round of 32	ESMTK (3)	3–1 (a.e.t.)	(2) Siófok	Budapest
13:30 CEST	Soós 7', 108' (pen.); Wirth 99'	Report	Nikházi 37'	Stadium: ESMTK Stadion; Attendance: 500; Referee: Árpád Jakab

19 October 2022 Round of 32	Nagyatád (4)	0–3	(3) Monor	Nagyatád
13:30 CEST		Report	Farkas 16'; Haragos 34'; Végh 90+3'	Stadium: Mudin Imre Sportcentrum; Attendance: 400; Referee: Tamás Móri

19 October 2022 Round of 32	Nyergesújfalu (4)	1–4	(1) Mezőkövesd	Nyergesújfalu
13:30 CEST	Manga 74' (pen.)	Report	Kiš 27'; Brtan 31'; Bobál 43'; Selmani 86'	Stadium: Hajnal Tamás Sportcentrum; Attendance: 700; Referee: Tamás Berényi

19 October 2022 Round of 32	Szombathelyi Haladás (2)	1–2	(1) Budapest Honvéd	Szombathely
17:00 CEST	Nyíri 41'	Report	Kocsis 11'; Kerezsi 14'; Klemenz (red card) 69'	Stadium: Haladás Sportkomplexum; Attendance: 1,617; Referee: Zoltán J. Kovács

19 October 2022 Round of 32	Ajka (2)	1–3	(1) Újpest	Ajka
17:00 CEST	Jagodics 45+1'	Report	Csongvai 18'; Gouré 50', 61'	Stadium: Városi Stadion; Attendance: 3,500; Referee: Márton Rúsz

19 October 2022 Round of 32	Kazincbarcika (2)	0–2	(1) Zalaegerszeg	Kazincbarcika
17:30 CEST		Report	Mocsi 5' (pen.); Lesjak 76'	Stadium: Pete András Stadion; Attendance: 550; Referee: Tamás Nazsa

19 October 2022 Round of 32	Fehérvár (1)	0–1	(1) Puskás Akadémia	Székesfehérvár
20:00 CEST		Report	Puljić 24'	Stadium: MOL Aréna Sóstó; Attendance: 1,425; Referee: Sándor Andó-Szabó

== Round of 16 ==
1 February 2023 Round of 16	MTK Budapest (2)	0–2	(1) Mezőkövesd	Budapest
18:00 CET		Report	Dražić 20'; Lukić 50'	Stadium: Hidegkuti Nándor Stadion; Attendance: 400; Referee: Péter Antal

7 February 2023 Round of 16	Vasas (1)	2–0	(1) Budapest Honvéd	Budapest
19:00 CET	Zimonyi 22'; Hinora 92'	Report	Prenga (yellow card) 22' (yellow-red card) 93'	Stadium: Illovszky Rudolf Stadion; Attendance: 1,300; Referee: Sándor Andó-Szabó

8 February 2023 Round of 16	Monor (3)	1–5	(1) Paks	Monor
13:00 CET	Farkas 28'; Juhász (red card) 26'	Report	Varga 17'; Szélpál 20'; Sajbán 48'; Skribek 67', 77'	Stadium: Balassi Bálint utcai Stadion; Attendance: 400; Referee: Mihály Káprály

8 February 2023 Round of 16	Békéscsaba (2)	0–2	(1) Zalaegerszeg	Békéscsaba
13:00 CET		Report	Ikoba 81'; Németh 87'	Stadium: Kórház utcai Stadion; Attendance: 380; Referee: Márton Rúsz

8 February 2023 Round of 16	Iváncsa (3)	1–2	(2) Budafok	Iváncsa
13:00 CET (UTC+1)	Bányai 41'	Report	Jagodics 55'; Beke 81'	Stadium: Károlyi István Sporttelep; Attendance: 400; Referee: Péter Zierkelbach

8 February 2023 Round of 16	ESMTK (3)	0–1 (a.e.t.)	(1) Kisvárda	Budapest
13:00 CET		Report	Molnár 123' (o.g.)	Stadium: ESMTK Stadion; Attendance: 500; Referee: Bence Hanyecz

8 February 2023 Round of 16	Győr (2)	1–2 (a.e.t.)	(1) Debreceni VSC	Győr
19:00 CET	Csinger 93'; Babati (red card) 89'	Report	Mance 45'; Lončar 105'	Stadium: ETO Park; Attendance: 770; Referee: Marcell Derdák

9 February 2023 Round of 16	Puskás Akadémia (1)	0–0 (a.e.t.) (5–4 p)	(1) Újpest	Felcsút
19:00 CET		Report		Stadium: Pancho Aréna; Attendance: 1,720; Referee: Gergő Bogár
	Penalties
	Puljić (penalty scored) van Nieff (penalty scored); Corbu (penalty missed); Gruber (penalty scored); Favorov (penalty scored); Batik (penalty scored)		(penalty scored) Boumal; (penalty missed) Simon; (penalty scored) Antonov; (penalty scored) Csongvai; (penalty missed) Gouré

== Quarter-finals ==
28 February 2023 Quarter-finals	Mezőkövesd (1)	1–4	(1) Zalaegerszeg	Mezőkövesd
20:00 CET	Molnár 70'	Report	Sanković 24'; Tajti 74'; Ikoba 88'; Huszti 90'	Stadium: Városi Stadion; Attendance: 700; Referee: Mihály Káprály

1 March 2023 Quarter-finals	Budafok (2)	2–0	(1) Kisvárda	Budapest
17:00 CET	Nándori 10'; Beke 45'	Report		Stadium: Promontor utcai Stadion; Attendance: 700; Referee: Márió Zimmermann

1 March 2023 Quarter-finals	Paks (1)	2–3	(1) Vasas	Paks
20:00 CET	Varga 19'; Böde 64'	Report	Silye 3'; Iyinbor 16'; Berecz 52' (pen.)	Stadium: Fehérvári úti Stadion; Attendance: 1,312; Referee: Péter Antal

2 March 2023 Quarter-finals	Debreceni VSC (1)	1–3	(1) Puskás Akadémia	Debrecen
20:00 CET	Ferenczi 31'	Report	Gruber 1'; Levi 12'; Slagveer 85'	Stadium: Nagyerdei Stadion; Attendance: 3,811; Referee: Bence Csonka

== Semi-finals ==
4 April 2023 Semi-finals	Zalaegerszeg (1)	1–0 (a.e.t.)	(1) Puskás Akadémia	Zalaegerszeg
20:00 CEST (UTC+2)	Bartolec 119' (o.g.)	Report		Stadium: ZTE Arena; Attendance: 2,081; Referee: István Vad

5 April 2023 Semi-finals	Budafok (2)	3–0	(1) Vasas	Budapest
20:00 CEST (UTC+2)	Beke 22', 34', 39'	Report		Stadium: Promontor utcai Stadion; Attendance: 2,450; Referee: Ádám Farkas

== Final ==
3 May 2023 Final	Budafok (2)	0–2 (a.e.t.)	(1) Zalaegerszeg	Budapest
19:30 CEST (UTC+2)		Report	D. Németh 117'; Szalay 120+2'	Stadium: Puskás Aréna; Attendance: 24,152; Referee: István Vad

== See also ==
- 2022–23 Nemzeti Bajnokság I
- 2022–23 Nemzeti Bajnokság II
- 2022–23 Nemzeti Bajnokság III
