= 2022–23 Békéscsaba 1912 Előre season =

Békéscsaba
2022–23 season
- Chairman: János Kozma
- Manager: Gábor Brlázs (until 12 April); József Pásztor (caretaker, from 12 April)
- Stadium: Kórház utcai Stadion
- Nemzeti Bajnokság II: 19th (relegated)
- Magyar Kupa: Round of 16
- Top goalscorer: League: Ádám Czékus (10); All: Ádám Czékus (12)
- Highest home attendance: 1,850 (vs MTK, 17 August 2022)
- Lowest home attendance: 340 (vs Pécs, 11 December 2022)
- Average home league attendance: 888

The 2022–23 season was Békéscsaba 1912 Előre's 105th competitive season, 7th consecutive season in the Nemzeti Bajnokság II and 110th year in existence as a football club. In addition to the domestic league, Békéscsaba participated in this season's editions of the Magyar Kupa.

== First team squad ==
As of 3 February 2023

Note: Flags indicate national team as defined under FIFA eligibility rules; some limited exceptions apply. Players may hold more than one non-FIFA nationality.

No.	Pos.	Nation	Player
1	GK	(Hungary) HUN	Antal Czinanó
4	DF	(Hungary) HUN	Márk Farkas
5	MF	(Hungary) HUN	Zsombor Futó
6	MF	(Hungary) HUN	Miklós Kitl
8	MF	(Hungary) HUN	Levente Zvara
9	FW	(Romania) ROU	Raymond Lukács
14	MF	(Hungary) HUN	Ádám Váradi
15	MF	(Hungary) HUN	Dominik Máris
17	FW	(Hungary) HUN	Tamás Ilyés
19	DF	(Hungary) HUN	Roland Mikló
21	DF	(Hungary) HUN	Lóránt Fazekas
22	FW	(Hungary) HUN	Marcell Bónus
25	DF	(Hungary) HUN	István Albert
26	FW	(Hungary) HUN	Bence Magócsi

No.	Pos.	Nation	Player
27	FW	(Hungary) HUN	Nándor Kóródi
28	MF	(Hungary) HUN	Márk Hodonicki
30	FW	(Sudan) SDN	Yasin Hamed (loaned from Nyíregyháza)
32	MF	(Hungary) HUN	Botond Farkas (loaned from Vasas)
35	GK	(Hungary) HUN	Richárd Krnács
37	FW	(Hungary) HUN	Ádám Czékus
42	DF	(Hungary) HUN	Csaba Szabó
55	DF	(Hungary) HUN	György Bora (captain)
64	FW	(Hungary) HUN	Krisztián Zádori
66	DF	(Hungary) HUN	Dániel Szalai
77	MF	(Hungary) HUN	Péter Horváth
81	DF	(Hungary) HUN	Gábor Puskás
90	GK	(Hungary) HUN	Dániel Póser
95	FW	(Hungary) HUN	Norbert Talpalló

== Competitions ==
=== Overview ===
Competition	First match	Last match	Starting round	Final position	Record							
Competition	First match	Last match	Starting round	Final position	Pld	W	D	L	GF	GA	GD	Win %
Nemzeti Bajnokság II	31 July 2022	21 May 2023	Matchday 1	19th	38	8	13	17	47	56	−9	21.05
Magyar Kupa	17 September 2022	8 February 2023	Round of 64	Round of 16	3	2	0	1	8	3	+5	66.67
Total					41	10	13	18	55	59	−4	24.39

Source: Competitions

=== Nemzeti Bajnokság II ===
==== League table ====
Pos	Team	Pld	W	D	L	GF	GA	GD	Pts	Promotion or relegation
16	Kozármisleny (O)	38	11	8	19	46	63	−17	41	Qualification for relegation play-offs
17	Szentlőrinc (R)	38	9	12	17	44	58	−14	39	Qualification for relegation play-offs
18	Nyíregyháza (O)	38	9	11	18	46	55	−9	38	Qualification for relegation play-offs
19	Békéscsaba (R)	38	8	13	17	47	56	−9	37	Relegation to Nemzeti Bajnokság III
20	Dorog (R)	38	7	10	21	32	61	−29	31	Relegation to Nemzeti Bajnokság III

Source: Hungarian Football Federation (in Hungarian), Soccerway
Rules for classification: 1) Points; 2) Matches won; 3) Goal difference; 4) Goals scored; 5) Head-to-head points; 6) Head-to-head goal difference; 7) Fair play ranking; 8) Drawing of lots.
(O) Play-off winners; (R) Relegated

==== Results summary ====
Overall								Home						Away					
Pld	W	D	L	GF	GA	GD	Pts	W	D	L	GF	GA	GD	W	D	L	GF	GA	GD
38	8	13	17	47	56	−9	37	6	7	6	31	26	+5	2	6	11	16	30	−14

Source: HFF

==== Results by round ====
Round	1	2	3	4	5	6	7	8	9	10	11	12	13	14	15	16	17	18	19	20	21	22	23	24	25	26	27	28	29	30	31	32	33	34	35	36	37	38
Ground	A	H	A	H	A	H	A	A	H	A	H	A	H	A	H	A	H	A	H	H	A	H	A	H	A	H	H	A	H	A	H	A	H	A	H	A	H	A
Result	L	W	W	L	D	D	D	L	L	L	L	L	W	L	D	D	W	L	L	L	W	D	L	W	D	D	D	D	D	L	L	D	W	L	D	L	W	L
Position	13	7	6	8	9	11	12	13	15	18	19	20	18	18	19	19	18	18	19	19	18	18	18	18	18	18	18	17	17	18	19	19	17	18	19	19	19	19

Source: Matches
A = Away; H = Home; W = Win; D = Draw; L = Loss

==== Matches ====
31 July 2022 1	Pécs	1–0	Békéscsaba	Pécs
19:00 CEST (UTC+2)	Tóth-Gábor 71'	Report		Stadium: Stadion PMFC; Attendance: 1,500; Referee: Tibor Farkas

7 August 2022 2	Békéscsaba	6–1	Kazincbarcika	Békéscsaba
19:00 CEST (UTC+2)	R. Lukács 28' (pen.); Kitl 54'; Á. Váradi 74', 84'; P. Horváth 82' (pen.); Czékus 90+2'	Report	Heil 25'	Stadium: Kórház utcai Stadion; Attendance: 1,340; Referee: Tamás Nazsa

14 August 2022 3	Gyirmót	0–1	Békéscsaba	Győr
17:30 CEST (UTC+2)		Report	Hamed 90+2'	Stadium: Ménfői úti Stadion; Attendance: 1,043; Referee: Bálint Dolnegó

17 August 2022 4	Békéscsaba	1–4	MTK	Békéscsaba
19:00 CEST (UTC+2)	R. Lukács 64' (pen.)	Report	K. Németh 44', 83'; Stiber 52'; Futács 90+2' (pen.)	Stadium: Kórház utcai Stadion; Attendance: 1,850; Referee: Márton Rúsz

21 August 2022 5	Szentlőrinc	2–2	Békéscsaba	Szentlőrinc
17:30 CEST (UTC+2)	M. Szabó 76'; R. Csörgő 90+4'	Report	N. Talpalló 13'; R. Mikló 43'	Stadium: Szentlőrinci Sporttelep; Attendance: 600; Referee: Gergely Bana

28 August 2022 6	Békéscsaba	0–0	Dorog	Békéscsaba
17:30 CEST (UTC+2)		Report		Stadium: Kórház utcai Stadion; Attendance: 1,230; Referee: Norbert Nagy

4 September 2022 7	Szeged-Csanád	3–3	Békéscsaba	Szeged
17:00 CEST (UTC+2)	Bíró 21', 41' (pen.); Jammeh 84'	Report	Czékus 31'; G. Puskás 51'; Hamed 70'	Stadium: Szent Gellért Fórum; Attendance: 3,100; Referee: Ádám Pillók

11 September 2022 8	Budafok	1–0	Békéscsaba	Budapest
16:00 CEST (UTC+2)	Adorján 39'	Report		Stadium: Promontor utcai Stadion; Attendance: 400; Referee: Márton Rúsz

2 October 2022 9	Békéscsaba	0–1	Mosonmagyaróvár	Békéscsaba
15:00 CEST (UTC+2)		Report	Z. Nagy 86'	Stadium: Kórház utcai Stadion; Attendance: 830; Referee: Tibor Farkas

5 October 2022 10	Kozármisleny	1–0	Békéscsaba	Kozármisleny
18:00 CEST (UTC+2)	Kosznovszky 50'	Report		Stadium: Kozármislenyi Stadion; Attendance: 400; Referee: Marcell Derdák

9 October 2022 11	Békéscsaba	1–2	Diósgyőr	Békéscsaba
17:00 CEST (UTC+2)	Czékus 86'	Report	L. Fazekas 61' (o.g.); Holdampf 74'	Stadium: Kórház utcai Stadion; Attendance: 1,228; Referee: Zoltán J. Kovács

16 October 2022 12	Csákvár	2–0	Békéscsaba	Csákvár
13:00 CEST (UTC+2)	Körmendi 54'; Baracskai 57'	Report		Stadium: Tersztyánszky Ödön Sportközpont; Attendance: 300; Referee: Tamás Móri

22 October 2022 13	Békéscsaba	4–3	Nyíregyháza	Békéscsaba
17:00 CEST (UTC+2)	Hamed 7', 47'; Szalai 19'; P. Horváth 67'	Report	Pekár 5'; Á. Kovács 64'; Novák 81' (pen.)	Stadium: Kórház utcai Stadion; Attendance: 860; Referee: Tamás Sipos

30 October 2022 14	Győr	4–1	Békéscsaba	Győr
15:00 CEST (UTC+2)	A. Lacza 17'; Benczenleitner 36'; Priskin 40'; Babati 73'	Report	P. Horváth 10'	Stadium: ETO Park; Attendance: 742; Referee: József Ducsai

6 November 2022 15	Békéscsaba	2–2	Haladás	Békéscsaba
13:00 CEST (UTC+2)	M. Farkas 4'; Hamed 90+2'	Report	Rácz 42', 47' (pen.)	Stadium: Kórház utcai Stadion; Attendance: 720; Referee: Tamás Nazsa

9 November 2022 16	Siófok	2–2	Békéscsaba	Siófok
13:00 CEST (UTC+2)	Z. Varjas 11'; R. Krausz 35'	Report	D. Máris 79'; Hamed 90'	Stadium: Révész Géza utcai Stadion; Attendance: 100; Referee: Ákos Gaál

13 November 2022 17	Békéscsaba	3–1	Soroksár	Békéscsaba
13:00 CEST (UTC+2)	T. Ilyés 22'; Czékus 23'; Á. Váradi 82'	Report	Redzic 49'	Stadium: Kórház utcai Stadion; Attendance: 580; Referee: Tibor Horváth

27 November 2022 18	Tiszakécske	2–0	Békéscsaba	Tiszakécske
15:00 CEST (UTC+2)	Z. Horváth 6'; N. Geiger 46'	Report		Stadium: Városi Stadion; Attendance: 200; Referee: Róbert Nagy

4 December 2022 19	Békéscsaba	0–1	Ajka	Békéscsaba
13:00 CEST (UTC+2)		Report	Zsolnai 40'	Stadium: Kórház utcai Stadion; Attendance: 460; Referee: Ádám Radványi

11 December 2022 20	Békéscsaba	0–1	Pécs	Békéscsaba
13:00 CEST (UTC+2)		Report	Kocsis 47'	Stadium: Kórház utcai Stadion; Attendance: 340; Referee: Tamás Berényi

29 January 2023 21	Kazincbarcika	1–3	Békéscsaba	Kazincbarcika
13:00 CEST (UTC+2)	A. Süttő 90+3' (pen.)	Report	G. Puskás 6'; R. Lukács 45+2'; Czékus 51'	Stadium: Kolorcity Aréna; Attendance: 400; Referee: Tamás Sipos

5 February 2023 22	Békéscsaba	1–1	Gyirmót	Békéscsaba
14:00 CEST (UTC+2)	P. Horváth 27' (pen.)	Report	Madarász 83'	Stadium: Kórház utcai Stadion; Attendance: 460; Referee: Imre Kovács

13 February 2023 23	MTK	3–0	Békéscsaba	Budapest
19:00 CEST (UTC+2)	Stieber 67'; Zuigéber 78'; K. Németh 87'	Report		Stadium: Hidegkuti Nándor Stadion; Attendance: 500; Referee: Marcell Derdák

19 February 2023 24	Békéscsaba	2–0	Szentlőrinc	Békéscsaba
14:00 CEST (UTC+2)	P. Kiss-Szemán 85' (o.g.); Czékus 90+3'	Report		Stadium: Kórház utcai Stadion; Attendance: 540; Referee: Tibor Farkas

26 February 2023 25	Dorog	1–1	Békéscsaba	Dorog
14:00 CEST (UTC+2)	J. Szalai 17'	Report	Czékus 87'	Stadium: Buzánszky Jenő Stadion; Attendance: 400; Referee: Tamás Móri

5 March 2023 26	Békéscsaba	1–1	Szeged-Csanád	Békéscsaba
14:00 CEST (UTC+2)	P. Horváth 45+1'	Report	A. Temesvári 81'	Stadium: Kórház utcai Stadion; Attendance: 1,320; Referee: Balázs Katona

12 March 2023 27	Békéscsaba	2–2	Budafok	Békéscsaba
14:00 CEST (UTC+2)	Czékus 29', 35'	Report	Soltész 68'; P. Beke II 78'	Stadium: Kórház utcai Stadion; Attendance: 670; Referee: Róbert Nagy

19 March 2023 28	Mosonmagyaróvár	0–0	Békéscsaba	Mosonmagyaróvár
14:00 CEST (UTC+2)		Report		Stadium: Wittmann Antal park Attendance: 500; Referee: József Ducsai

2 April 2023 29	Békéscsaba	1–1	Kozármisleny	Békéscsaba
16:00 CEST (UTC+2)	Z. Futó 27'	Report	Várkonyi 48'	Stadium: Kórház utcai Stadion; Attendance: 710; Referee: Márió Zimmermann

9 April 2023 30	Diósgyőr	1–0	Békéscsaba	Diósgyőr
16:30 CEST (UTC+2)	D. Lukács 100'	Report		Stadium: DVTK Stadion; Attendance: 3,872; Referee: Norbert Nagy

12 April 2023 31	Békéscsaba	1–2	Csákvár	Békéscsaba
16:00 CEST (UTC+2)	R. Lukács 28'	Report	Z. Magyar 6', 79'	Stadium: Kórház utcai Stadion; Attendance: 520; Referee: Balázs Katona

16 April 2023 32	Nyíregyháza	1–1	Békéscsaba	Balmazújváros
17:00 CEST (UTC+2)	M. Gresó 83'	Report	R. Lukács 48'	Stadium: Városi Sportpálya; Attendance: 500; Referee: Tamás Berényi

23 April 2023 33	Békéscsaba	2–0	Győr	Békéscsaba
17:00 CEST (UTC+2)	L. Fazekas 19'; Fodor 69' (o.g.)	Report		Stadium: Kórház utcai Stadion; Attendance: 1,040; Referee: Zoltán J. Kovács

26 April 2023 34	Haladás	2–1	Békéscsaba	Szombathely
17:00 CEST (UTC+2)	R. Horváth 24'; R. Molnár 52' (pen.)	Report	I. Albert 7'	Stadium: Haladás Sportkomplexum; Attendance: 628; Referee: Árpád Jakab

30 April 2023 35	Békéscsaba	2–2	Siófok	Békéscsaba
17:00 CEST (UTC+2)	Czékus 13'; T. Ilyés 40'	Report	Z. Varjas 18'; C. Dénes 90+2'	Stadium: Kórház utcai Stadion; Attendance: 1,350; Referee: Márton Rúsz

7 May 2023 36	Soroksár	1–0	Békéscsaba	Budapest
17:00 CEST (UTC+2)	Lovrencsics 90+2'	Report		Stadium: Szamosi Mihály Sportelep; Attendance: 500; Referee: Ádám Pillók

15 May 2023 37	Békéscsaba	2–1	Tiszakécske	Békéscsaba
20:00 CEST (UTC+2)	G. Bora 5'; I. Albert 90+5'	Report	Z. Horváth 49'	Stadium: Kórház utcai Stadion; Attendance: 830; Referee: Imre Kovács

21 May 2023 38	Ajka	2–1	Békéscsaba	Ajka
19:45 CEST (UTC+2)	Z. Kenderes 9'; Zsolnai 26'	Report	D. Máris 48'	Stadium: Ajkai Városi Sportcentrum; Attendance: 1,800; Referee: Marcell Derdák

=== Magyar Kupa ===
17 September 2022 Round of 64	Szegedi VSE	0–4	Békéscsaba	Szeged
13:00 CEST (UTC+2)		Report	R. Lukács 27' (pen.), 33', 90+1'; Czékus 39'	Stadium: Szegedi VSE Stadion; Referee: Attila László Nagy

19 October 2022 Round of 32	Nagykanizsa	1–4	Békéscsaba	Nagykanizsa
13:30 CEST (UTC+2)	B. Lőrincz 65' (pen.)	Report	Hamed 22'; Kitl 77' (pen.); Á. Váradi 87'; Czékus 90+4'	Stadium: Olajbányász Sporttelep; Attendance: 400; Referee: Gergely Bana

8 February 2023 Round of 16	Békéscsaba	0–2	Zalaegerszeg	Békéscsaba
13:00 CET (UTC+1)		Report	Ikoba 81'; Németh 87'	Stadium: Kórház utcai Stadion; Attendance: 380; Referee: Márton Rúsz
