= Ricardo Moniz =

Dutch football player and manager (born 1964)

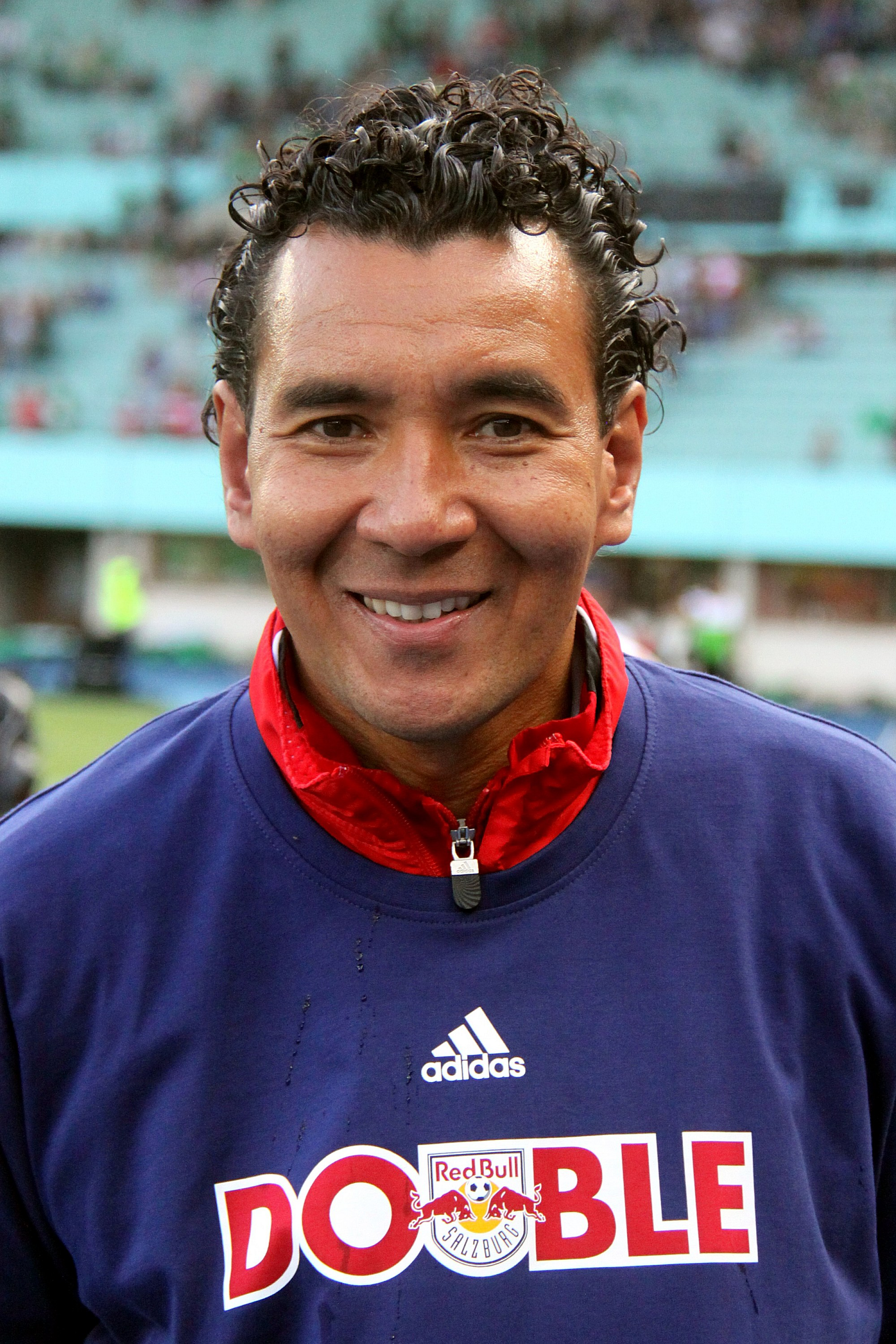
- Moniz in 2012

Personal information
- Date of birth: 17 June 1964 (age 62)
- Place of birth: Rotterdam, Netherlands
- Position: Defender

Team information
- Current team: Trenčín (manager)

Senior career*
Years	Team	Apps	(Gls)
1981–1984	Eindhoven	71	(13)
1984–1988	HFC Haarlem	95	(9)
1988–1991	RKC Waalwijk	67	(12)
1991–1992	Eeklo	18	(1)
1992–1993	Helmond Sport	22	(4)
Total		273	(39)

Managerial career
- 1994–1997: RKSV Nuenen
- 2004–2005: Jong PSV
- 2010: Hamburger SV (caretaker)
- 2011–2012: Red Bull Salzburg
- 2012–2013: Ferencváros
- 2014: Lechia Gdańsk
- 2014: 1860 Munich
- 2015: Notts County
- 2016–2017: Eindhoven
- 2017–2018: Randers
- 2018: Trenčín
- 2019–2020: Excelsior
- 2022–2023: Zalaegerszeg
- 2023: Slaven Belupo
- 2024–2025: Zürich
- 2025–2026: Trenčín
- * Club domestic league appearances and goals

Ricardo Moniz (born 17 June 1964) is a Dutch football manager and former player who is the head coach of Slovak club Trenčín.

== Playing career ==
Moniz played for RKC Waalwijk, HFC Haarlem, Helmond Sport and Eindhoven.

== Coaching career ==
Moniz was formerly a skills trainer at Tottenham Hotspur, leaving the club in May 2008 after three seasons.

Moniz is one of the few proteges of the skills training guru Wiel Coerver which is aimed at improving technical ability over tactical ability. He was previously an academy coach at PSV Eindhoven.

On 8 June 2008, he signed a new contract to be the new skills and talent coach next to head coach Martin Jol at Hamburger SV. On 26 April 2010, he was named the interim head coach by Hamburger SV, replacing Bruno Labbadia for the last two games in the season 2009/2010. He was in that position until Armin Veh was hired on 24 May 2010.

=== Salzburg ===
Ricardo was then appointed the Global Director of Youth Development for Red Bull, responsible for academies in four continents. After the resignations of Huub Stevens and Dietmar Beiersdorfer on 8 April 2011, Moniz was named the new head coach of Red Bull Salzburg.

Ricardo won the League and Cup double with Red Bull Salzburg. Becoming the first manager in Salzburg history (Austria and Red Bull Salzburg) to achieve a league and cup double.

In June 2012, he resigned after internal differences.

=== Ferencváros ===
On 21 August 2012, Ricardo Moniz was appointed as the new manager of the Hungarian League club Ferencváros. At FTC, his devotion to football became immediately popular among fans and many successes followed. Yet, struggling with difficult circumstances, on 2 December 2013, Moniz was sacked by Ferencváros due to poor performance of the team.

Ricardo was voted the Austrian manager of the year for the 2011/2012 season and achieved the Hungarian Players Union Manager of the Year in 2012/2013.

=== Gdansk ===
On 27 March 2014, he was named a new coach of Lechia Gdańsk, and successfully brought them to their highest ever league position, of 4th. On 4 June 2014, he resigned from his position for personal reasons. Shortly after resigning from Lechia, he became new manager of 1860 Munich, where he made the then 18 year old Julian Weigl captain. Moniz was sacked on 24 September 2014.

=== Notts County ===
On 7 April 2015, Moniz was appointed manager of the League One club Notts County on a three-year contract. He was sacked on 29 December 2015 with Notts 15th in League Two.

=== Eindhoven ===
In July 2016, he became new manager of Eindhoven. He left the club at the end of the 2016–17 season.

=== Randers ===
On 8 October 2017, Ricardo Moniz was signed up as new manager of Danish Superliga club Randers. He was sacked by the Randers board of directors on 26 January 2018, after only nine games as head coach.

=== Trencin ===
On 2 June 2018, Moniz was appointed the new head coach of Slovak Super Liga club Trenčín. In October 2018, after only a few months in charge, he announced that he was leaving the club, citing widespread corruption in Slovak football as the reason.

=== Excelsior ===
On 8 April 2019, Excelsior confirmed the appointment of Ricardo Moniz as their head coach until the end of the season.

On 28 January 2020, Excelsior decided to terminate the contract with Ricardo Moniz, after disappointing results in the 2019-2020 Eerste Divisie.

=== Zalaegerszeg ===
On 25 May 2022, it was announced that Moniz had been appointed head coach of Hungarian Nemzeti Bajnokság I club Zalaegerszeg.

In the 2022-23 Nemzeti Bajnokság I season, Zalaegerszeg hosted Honvéd. During the match, Honvéd fans shouted racist comments. After the match, Moniz heavily criticized the referee for not terminating the match.

In October 2022, Moniz was suspended by the Hungarian Football Federation.

In an interview, published on Nemzeti Sport, Moniz said that Zalaegerszeg cannot purchase top players, therefore, a bigger emphasis should be placed on the youth academies.

On 25 February 2023, Moniz paid tribute to Miklós Lendvai, who died at the age of 48, by beating Fehérvár in the 2022-23 Nemzeti Bajnokság I season. Moniz was dismissed from Zalaegerszegi TE FC in April 2023.

=== Slaven Belupo ===
Moniz takes over as coach of the Croatian club Slaven Belupo on 15 June 2023. He was sacked on 4 September 2023 after only one win in seven games.

=== Zürich ===
On 20 October 2023 he joined the backroom staff of Swiss club Zürich. In January 2024, he became coach of Zürich's youth team. On 22 April 2024, he was appointed the interim head coach of Zürich for the final five games of the season. His permanent appointment as head coach was announced on 24 May 2024. He signed on a two-year deal. In the 2024–25 Swiss Super League, FC Zürich missed qualification to the Championship Group and ended the season in 7th place. He was dismissed from his position following the conclusion of the season on 27 May 2025.

=== Trencin ===
In June 2025, Moniz returned to Slovak club FK AS Trenčín as head coach. He had previously managed the top-tier side from July to October 2018.

== Personal life ==
Moniz was born in the Netherlands to a Surinamese father, and an Indonesian mother of Chinese descent.

== Coaching record ==
As of 23 August 2025

Team	From	To	Record					
Team	From	To	G	W	D	L	Win %	Ref.
Hamburger SV	26 April 2010	24 May 2010	3	1	1	1	33.33	
Red Bull Salzburg	29 April 2011	12 June 2012	62	37	14	11	59.68	
Ferencváros	21 August 2012	2 December 2013	61	34	13	14	55.74	
Lechia Gdańsk	27 March 2014	4 June 2014	10	5	3	2	50.00	
1860 Munich	4 June 2014	24 September 2014	8	2	3	3	25.00	
Notts County	7 April 2015	29 December 2015	34	11	8	15	32.35	
Eindhoven	1 July 2016	19 May 2017	40	16	8	16	40.00	
Randers	8 October 2017	26 January 2018	9	3	1	5	33.33	
Trenčín	1 July 2018	28 October 2018	25	12	5	8	48.00	
Excelsior	8 April 2019	28 January 2020	32	13	8	11	40.63	
Zalaegerszeg	1 July 2022	24 April 2023	33	13	7	13	39.39	
Slaven Belupo	1 July 2023	4 September 2023	7	1	3	3	14.29	
Zürich	22 April 2024	27 May 2025	52	23	9	20	44.23	
Total			376	171	83	122	45.48	—

== Honours ==
Red Bull Salzburg

- Austrian Bundesliga: 2011–12
- Austrian Cup: 2011–12

Ferencváros

- Hungarian League Cup: 2012–13

Zalaegerszeg

- Hungarian Cup: 2022–23
