= 2026–27 FK Csíkszereda season =

FK Csíkszereda
2026–27 season
- Manager: István Szabó
- Superliga: Pre-season
- Cupa României: Pre-season

The 2026–27 season is the 123rd season in the history of Futball Club Csíkszereda and their second consecutive season in Liga I. The club will also compete in the Cupa României.

On 3 June 2026, István Szabó assumed the managerial role on a one-year contract with an option for a further season.

== Transfers ==
=== In ===
Pos.	Player	Transferred from	Fee	Date	Source
FW	(Hungary) Ádám Czékus	(Hungary) Kecskeméti TE	Undisclosed	1 July 2026	
MF	(Romania) Albert Stahl	(Romania) Bihor Oradea	Undisclosed	1 July 2026	

=== Out ===
Pos.	Player	Transferred to	Fee	Date	Source
MF	(Brazil) Anderson Ceará	(Romania) FCSB	Undisclosed	1 July 2026	
MF	(Sweden) Wilhelm Loeper	(United Arab Emirates) Dibba Al-Hisn	Free	7 July 2026	

== Pre-season and friendlies ==
20 June 2026 Friendly	Sepsi OSK (Romania)	2–0	(Romania) Csíkszereda
10:00	13', 44'

1 July 2026 Friendly	Radnički Niš (Serbia)	0–2	(Romania) Csíkszereda
17:30			80'; 86'

4 July 2026 Friendly	Zbrojovka Brno (Czech Republic)	2–1	(Romania) Csíkszereda
16:00

8 July 2026 Friendly	Slaven Belupo (Croatia)	3–1	(Romania) Csíkszereda
17:30

== Competitions ==
=== Superliga ===
Pos	Team	Pld	W	D	L	GF	GA	GD	Pts	Qualification
12	Dinamo București	1	0	0	1	0	1	−1	0	Advances to Play-out
13	Sepsi OSK Sfântu Gheorghe	1	0	0	1	0	1	−1	0	Advances to Play-out
14	Argeș Pitești	1	0	0	1	0	2	−2	0	Advances to Play-out
15	Csíkszereda Miercurea Ciuc	1	0	0	1	0	3	−3	0	Advances to Play-out
16	UTA Arad	1	0	0	1	0	4	−4	0	Advances to Play-out

Updated to match(es) played on 20 July, 2026. Source: LPF (in Romanian)
Rules for classification: 1) Points; 2) Head-to-head points; 3) Head-to-head goal difference; 4) Head-to-head goals scored; 5) Goal difference; 6) Goals scored; 7) Play-off.

==== Results by round ====
Round	1	2
Ground	A	H
Result	L	
Position		

A = Away; H = Home; W = Win; D = Draw; L = Loss

20 July 2026 1	Corvinul Hunedoara	v	Csíkszereda	Arad
18:30 UTC+3				Stadium: Francisc von Neuman Stadium

26 July 2026 2	Csíkszereda	v	FCSB	Miercurea Ciuc
20:30
