= 2022–23 Nemzeti Bajnokság I =

Nemzeti Bajnokság I
- Season: 2022–23
- Dates: 29 July 2022 – 27 May 2023
- Champions: Ferencváros (34th title)
- Relegated: Budapest Honvéd; Vasas
- Champions League: Ferencváros
- Europa Conference League: Kecskemét; Debrecen; Zalaegerszeg
- Matches: 198
- Goals: 530 (2.68 per match)
- Top goalscorer: Barnabás Varga (26 goals)
- Biggest home win: Paks 5–0 Honvéd (6 November 2022)
- Biggest away win: Újpest 0–6 Ferencváros (4 September 2022)
- Highest scoring: Debrecen 4–3 Honvéd (1 October 2022)
- Longest winning run: Ferencváros; Paks (6 matches)
- Longest unbeaten run: Puskás Akadémia (10 matches)
- Longest winless run: Vasas (10 matches) (twice)
- Longest losing run: Vasas (5 matches)
- Highest attendance: 18,197; Ferencváros 3–1 Újpest; 5 February 2023
- Lowest attendance: 968; Puskás Akadémia 1–1 Vasas; 3 February 2023
- Total attendance: 699,102
- Average attendance: 3,530
- All statistics correct as of 27 January 2023.

The 2022–23 Nemzeti Bajnokság I (also known as 2022–23 OTP Bank Liga), also known as NB I, was the 124th season of top-tier football in Hungary. The league was officially named OTP Bank Liga for sponsorship reasons. Ferencváros were the defending champions. As the 2022 FIFA World Cup started on 20 November, the last round before stoppage was held on 12–13 November. The league resumed games on 28 January.

== Teams ==
MTK Budapest and Gyirmót finished the 2021–22 Nemzeti Bajnokság I in the last two places and thus were relegated to NB II division.

The two relegated teams were replaced with the top two teams in 2021–22 Nemzeti Bajnokság II, champion Vasas and runner-up Kecskemét, each having the required licence for top-division play.

=== Stadium and locations ===
Following is the list of clubs competed in the league this season, with their location, stadium and stadium capacity.

Team	Location	Stadium	Capacity	2021–22
Debrecen	Debrecen	Nagyerdei Stadion	20,340	7th
Fehérvár	Székesfehérvár	MOL Aréna Sóstó	14,144	4th
Ferencváros	Budapest (Ferencváros)	Groupama Aréna	22,043	1st
Honvéd	Budapest (Kispest)	Bozsik Aréna	8,000	9th
Kecskemét	Kecskemét	Széktói Stadion	6,320	2nd (NB II)
Kisvárda	Kisvárda	Várkerti Stadion	3,385	2nd
Mezőkövesd	Mezőkövesd	Városi Stadion	4,183	10th
Vasas	Budapest (Angyalföld)	Illovszky Rudolf Stadion	5,154	1st (NB II)
Puskás Akadémia	Felcsút	Pancho Aréna	3,816	3rd
Paks	Paks	Fehérvári úti Stadion	6,150	6th
Újpest	Budapest (Újpest)	Szusza Ferenc Stadion	12,670	5th
Zalaegerszeg	Zalaegerszeg	ZTE Aréna	11,200	8th

Debrecen	Fehérvár	Ferencváros	Honvéd
Nagyerdei Stadion	MOL Aréna Sóstó	Groupama Aréna	Bozsik Aréna
Capacity: 20,340	Capacity: 14,201	Capacity: 22,043	Capacity: 8,428
Kecskemét	Location of teams in 2022–23 Nemzeti Bajnokság I Location of Budapest teams		Kisvárda
Széktói Stadion	Location of teams in 2022–23 Nemzeti Bajnokság I Location of Budapest teams		Várkerti Stadion
Capacity: 6,320	Location of teams in 2022–23 Nemzeti Bajnokság I Location of Budapest teams		Capacity: 3,385
Mezőkövesd	Location of teams in 2022–23 Nemzeti Bajnokság I Location of Budapest teams		Paks
Városi-Stadion	Location of teams in 2022–23 Nemzeti Bajnokság I Location of Budapest teams		Fehérvári úti Stadion
Capacity: 4,183	Location of teams in 2022–23 Nemzeti Bajnokság I Location of Budapest teams		Capacity: 6,163
Puskás Akadémia	Újpest	Vasas	Zalaegerszeg
Pancho Aréna	Szusza Ferenc Stadion	Illovszky Rudolf Stadion	ZTE Arena
Capacity: 3,816	Capacity: 13,432	Capacity: 5,154	Capacity: 11,200

=== Personnel and kits ===
All teams were obligated to have the logo of the league sponsor OTP Bank as well as the Nemzeti Bajnokság I logo on the right side of their shirt. Hungarian national sports betting brand Tippmix sponsored all 12 teams of the first league since February 2019, their logo were present on all team kits.

Note: Flags indicate national team as has been defined under FIFA eligibility rules. Players and Managers may hold more than one non-FIFA nationality.

Team	Head coach	Captain	Kit manufacturer	Additional shirt sponsor
Debrecen	(Serbia) Srđan Blagojević	(Hungary) Balázs Dzsudzsák	Adidas	Tranzit-Food
Fehérvár	(Sweden) Bartosz Grzelak	(Hungary) Attila Fiola	Adidas	MOL
Ferencváros	(Russia) Stanislav Cherchesov	(Hungary) Dénes Dibusz	Nike	Magyar Telekom
Kecskemét	(Hungary) István Szabó	(Hungary) Levente Vágó	Zeus	HÉP
Honvéd	(Croatia) Dean Klafurić	(Croatia) Ivan Lovrić	Macron	
Kisvárda	(Serbia) Miloš Kruščić	(Bosnia and Herzegovina) Jasmin Mešanović	Adidas	MasterGood
Mezőkövesd	(Hungary) Attila Kuttor	(Hungary) Tamás Cseri	Adidas	Zsóry Gyógy- és Strandfürdő
Paks	(Hungary) György Bognár	(Hungary) János Szabó	Jako	
Puskás Akadémia	(Slovakia) Zsolt Hornyák	(Hungary) Zsolt Nagy	2Rule	Mészáros & Mészáros
Újpest	(Serbia) Nebojša Vignjević	(Serbia) Nikola Mitrović	Puma	
Vasas	(Hungary) Szilárd Desits	(Hungary) Zsombor Berecz	Adidas	OTP Bank
Zalaegerszeg	(Netherlands) Ricardo Moniz	(Hungary) Dávid Kálnoki-Kis	2Rule	

==== Managerial changes ====
Team	Outgoing manager	Manner of departure	Date of vacancy	Position in table	Replaced by	Date of appointment
Debrecen	(Portugal) João Janeiro	Resigned	31 August 2022	11th	(Hungary) Tibor Dombi^{i}	31 August 2022
Vasas	(Hungary) Attila Kuttor	Sacked	6 September 2022	11th	(Hungary) Elemér Kondás	6 September 2022
Mezőkövesd	(Hungary) Attila Supka	Sacked	6 September 2022	10th	(Hungary) Attila Kuttor	14 September 2022
Debrecen	(Hungary) Tibor Dombi^{i}	End of interim spell	21 September 2022	10th	(Serbia) Srđan Blagojević	21 September 2022
Fehérvár	(Germany) Michael Boris	Sacked	17 October 2022	8th	(Hungary) Szabolcs Huszti	17 October 2022
Honvéd	(Scotland) Tam Courts	Mutual consent	24 October 2022	8th	(Croatia) Dean Klafurić	24 October 2022
Paks	(Hungary) Róbert Waltner	Sacked	13 February 2023	7th	(Hungary) György Bognár	14 February 2023
Fehérvár	(Hungary) Szabolcs Huszti	Sacked	14 March 2023	11th	(Sweden) Bartosz Grzelak	15 March 2023
Újpest	(Serbia) Miloš Kruščić	Sacked	23 March 2023	10th	(Serbia) Nebojša Vignjević	23 March 2023
Kisvárda	(Hungary) László Török	Sacked	27 March 2023	6th	(Serbia) Miloš Kruščić	27 March 2023
Vasas	(Hungary) Elemér Kondás	Sacked	6 April 2023	12th	(Hungary) Szilárd Desits^{i}	6 April 2023
Zalaegerszeg	(Netherlands) Ricardo Moniz	Sacked	24 April 2023	9th	(Hungary) Gábor Boér	24 April 2023

^{i} = interim

== League table ==
=== Standings ===
Pos	Team	Pld	W	D	L	GF	GA	GD	Pts	Qualification or relegation
1	Ferencváros (C)	33	19	6	8	62	33	+29	63	Qualification for the Champions League first qualifying round
2	Kecskemét	33	15	12	6	48	32	+16	57	Qualification for the Europa Conference League second qualifying round
3	Debrecen	33	15	9	9	52	39	+13	54	Qualification for the Europa Conference League second qualifying round
4	Puskás Akadémia	33	14	11	8	48	42	+6	53	
5	Paks	33	14	7	12	57	57	0	49	
6	Kisvárda	33	10	13	10	43	49	−6	43	
7	Mezőkövesd	33	11	9	13	40	43	−3	42	
8	Újpest	33	11	8	14	42	55	−13	41	
9	Zalaegerszeg	33	10	9	14	37	43	−6	39	Qualification for the Europa Conference League second qualifying round (Note: Zalaegerszeg qualified to the Europa Conference League second qualifying round as winners of the 2022–23 Magyar Kupa.)
10	Fehérvár	33	8	11	14	38	43	−5	35	
11	Budapest Honvéd (R)	33	8	9	16	34	51	−17	33	Relegation to the Nemzeti Bajnokság II
12	Vasas (R)	33	4	14	15	29	43	−14	26	Relegation to the Nemzeti Bajnokság II

Source: Hungarian Football Federation (in Hungarian), Soccerway
Rules for classification: 1) Points; 2) Matches won; 3) Goal difference; 4) Goals scored; 5) Head-to-head points; 6) Head-to-head goal difference; 7) Fair play ranking; 8) Drawing of lots.
(C) Champions; (R) Relegated

== Fixtures and results ==
=== Rounds 1–22 ===
Home \ Away	DEB	FEH	FER	HON	KEC	KIS	MEZ	PAK	PUS	UJP	VAS	ZAL
Debrecen	—	1–0	0–2	4–3	1–1	2–3	1–0	2–1	1–1	4–1	1–1	3–0
Fehérvár	1–1	—	2–2	4–0	2–1	4–1	2–1	1–1	1–1	0–1	2–1	1–1
Ferencváros	2–0	4–0	—	3–1	1–1	3–0	1–1	3–2	1–0	3–1	0–0	2–1
Honvéd	2–3	0–1	0–2	—	0–0	1–1	2–2	3–3	3–1	0–0	2–0	0–1
Kecskemét	2–2	2–1	2–0	2–2	—	3–3	1–0	3–1	1–1	2–2	0–0	3–1
Kisvárda	2–2	3–1	0–0	0–1	0–1	—	4–2	2–2	1–1	2–1	2–0	0–3
Mezőkövesd	4–2	2–1	2–1	0–0	2–1	1–1	—	1–2	1–0	1–0	1–1	0–5
Paks	1–0	2–0	1–3	5–0	0–0	1–3	0–2	—	1–3	3–1	0–1	3–1
Puskás Akadémia	2–1	1–1	2–4	1–0	1–1	0–1	1–0	1–4	—	2–0	1–1	1–0
Újpest	1–1	2–1	0–6	2–1	1–2	4–0	1–1	2–3	3–3	—	2–1	1–1
Vasas	0–3	2–0	0–1	1–2	1–2	2–2	1–0	2–2	1–1	0–1	—	1–1
Zalaegerszeg	4–2	2–1	1–2	0–2	0–0	1–3	0–0	3–0	1–2	1–0	0–0	—

Source: Hungarian Football Federation (in Hungarian), Soccerway
Legend: Blue = home team win; Yellow = draw; Red = away team win.

=== Rounds 23–33 ===
Home \ Away	DEB	FEH	FER	HON	KEC	KIS	MEZ	PAK	PUS	UJP	VAS	ZAL
Debrecen	—	2–0	—	0–0	1–2	—	—	—	0–1	2–0	3–1	—
Fehérvár	—	—	—	2–0	1–2	—	1–1	—	—	0–0	—	3–0
Ferencváros	1–3	2–2	—	3–0	—	3–0	—	—	1–2	—	—	—
Honvéd	—	—	—	—	1–0	—	2–3	1–2	—	0–1	—	1–0
Kecskemét	—	—	2–0	—	—	1–0	0–1	2–3	—	—	2–0	3–0
Kisvárda	0–1	0–0	—	2–2	—	—	—	—	2–2	2–0	2–1	—
Mezőkövesd	0–1	—	1–0	—	—	1–1	—	6–1	—	—	1–4	1–2
Paks	0–0	2–1	3–2	—	—	2–0	—	—	0–2	—	—	—
Puskás Akadémia	—	2–1	—	2–1	0–3	—	2–1	—	—	5–1	—	—
Újpest	—	—	2–3	—	3–0	—	1–0	3–2	—	—	1–1	3–2
Vasas	—	0–0	0–1	0–1	—	—	—	2–3	2–2	—	—	1–1
Zalaegerszeg	0–2	—	1–0	—	—	0–0	—	1–1	2–1	—	—	—

Source: Hungarian Football Federation (in Hungarian), Soccerway
Legend: Blue = home team win; Yellow = draw; Red = away team win.

== Statistics ==
=== Top goalscorers ===
Rank	Player	Club	Goals
1	(Hungary) Barnabás Varga	Paks	26
2	(Serbia) Stefan Dražić	Mezőkövesd	14
3	(North Macedonia) Dorian Babunski	Debrecen	13
3	(Bosnia and Herzegovina) Kenan Kodro	Fehérvár	13
3	(Serbia) Nenad Lukić	Budapest Honvéd	13
6	(Morocco) Ryan Mmaee	Ferencváros	12
7	(United States) Eduvie Ikoba	Zalaegerszeg	11
7	(Mali) Adama Traoré	Ferencváros	11
9	(Bosnia and Herzegovina) Dino Beširović	Mezőkövesd	8
9	(Ivory Coast) Fernand Gouré	Újpest	8
9	(Hungary) Filip Holender	Vasas	8
9	(Hungary) Bálint Katona	Kecskemét	8
9	(Bosnia and Herzegovina) Jasmin Mešanović	Kisvárda	8
9	(Iran) Shahab Zahedi	Puskás Akadémia	8

=== Hat-tricks ===
Player	For	Against	Result	Date	Round
(Hungary) Barnabás Varga	Paks	Budapest Honvéd	3–3	14 August 2022	3
(Mali) Adama Traoré	Ferencváros	Budapest Honvéd	3–1	28 August 2022	5
(United States) Eduvie Ikoba	Zalaegerszeg	Mezőkövesd	5–0	2 September 2022	7
(Hungary) Kevin Csoboth	Újpest	Zalaegerszeg	3–2	1 April 2023	25
(Hungary) Barnabás Varga	Paks	Kecskemét	3–2	28 April 2023	29
(Serbia) Stefan Dražić	Mezőkövesd	Paks	6–1	14 May 2023	31

== Attendances ==
Rank	Club	Average attendance	Highest attendance
1	Ferencvárosi TC	10,430	18,197
2	Debreceni VSC	5,493	14,014
3	Budapest Honvéd FC	4,063	7,300
4	Újpest FC	3,738	11,109
5	Fehérvár FC	3,239	6,237
6	Kecskeméti TE	2,835	4,950
7	Zalaegerszegi TE	2,492	5,514
8	Kisvárda FC	2,262	3,150
9	Vasas FC	2,233	4,295
10	Paksi FC	2,135	4,280
11	Mezőkövesd Zsóry SE	2,086	4,161
12	Puskás AFC	1,649	3,121

== See also ==
- 2022–23 Magyar Kupa
- 2022–23 Nemzeti Bajnokság II
- 2022–23 Nemzeti Bajnokság III
- 2022–23 Megyei Bajnokság I
