= 2022–23 Nemzeti Bajnokság II =

Nemzeti Bajnokság II
- Season: 2022–23
- Champions: Diósgyőr
- Promoted: Diósgyőr; MTK Budapest
- Relegated: Szentlőrinc; Békéscsaba; Dorog
- Matches: 380
- Top goalscorer: Krisztián Németh (22 goals)
- All statistics correct as of 12 August 2022.

The 2022–23 Nemzeti Bajnokság II (also known as 2022–23 Merkantil Bank Liga) is Hungary's 72nd season of the Nemzeti Bajnokság II, the second tier of the Hungarian football league system. The season began in July 2022.

== Overview ==
This league will be last season as 20 teams and reduced to 18 teams from 2023–24, two teams directly relegated to NB III and three teams will battle relegation play-off against Champions of each group NB III in 2022–23.

== Teams ==
The following teams have changed division since the 2021–22 season.

=== Team changes ===
==== To NB II ====
Relegated from 2021–22 Nemzeti Bajnokság I	Promoted from 2021–22 Nemzeti Bajnokság III
▼MTK Budapest ▼ Gyirmót	▲ Kazincbarcika (East) ▲ Kozármisleny (Centre) ▲ Mosonmagyaróvár (West)

==== From NB II ====
Promoted to 2022–23 Nemzeti Bajnokság I	Relegated to 2022–23 Nemzeti Bajnokság III
▲ Vasas ▲ Kecskemét	▼ Szolnok (Centre) ▼III. Kerület (West) ▼ Budaörs (West)

=== Stadium and locations ===
Location of teams in 2022–23 Nemzeti Bajnokság II
Location of Budapest teams.

Following is the list of clubs competing in the league this season, with their location, stadium and stadium capacity.

Team	Location	Stadium	Capacity	2021–22
Ajka	Ajka	Városi Stadion	5,000	9th
Békéscsaba	Békéscsaba	Kórház utcai Stadion	2,479	15th
Budafok	Budapest	Promontor utcai Stadion	4,000	14th
Csákvár	Csákvár	Tersztyánszky Ödön Stadion	2,020	12th
Diósgyőr	Miskolc	DVTK Stadion	15,325	3rd
Dorog	Dorog	Buzánszky Jenő Stadion	5,000	17th
Gyirmót	Győr	Alcufer Stadion	4,728	12nd (NB I)
Győr	Győr	ETO Park	15,600	7th
Kazincbarcika	Kazincbarcika	Kolorcity Aréna	1,080	1st (NB III, East)
Kozármisleny	Kozármisleny	Kozármislenyi Stadion	2,000	1st (NB III, Central)
MTK Budapest	Budapest	Hidegkuti Nándor Stadion	5,014	11th (NB I)
Mosonmagyaróvár	Mosonmagyaróvár	Wittmann Antal park	4,000	1st (NB III, West)
Nyíregyháza	Balmazújváros	Városi Stadion	2,291	10th
Pécs	Pécs	Stadion PMFC	7,000	11th
Siófok	Siófok	Révész Géza utcai Stadion	6,500	5th
Soroksár	Budapest (Soroksár)	Szamosi Mihály Sportelep	5,000	8th
Szeged-Csanád	Szeged	Szent Gellért Fórum	8,136	4th
Szentlőrinc	Szentlőrinc	Szentlőrinci Sportpálya	1,020	16th
Szombathelyi Haladás	Szombathely	Haladás Sportkomplexum	8,940	6th
Tiszakécske	Tiszakécske	Városi Stadion		13th

== League table ==
=== Standings ===
Pos	Team	Pld	W	D	L	GF	GA	GD	Pts	Promotion or relegation
1	Diósgyőr (C, P)	38	28	3	7	79	36	+43	87	Promotion to Nemzeti Bajnokság I
2	MTK Budapest (P)	38	22	8	8	86	48	+38	74	Promotion to Nemzeti Bajnokság I
3	Ajka	38	20	8	10	54	37	+17	68	
4	Szeged	38	18	10	10	50	38	+12	64	
5	Soroksár	38	16	13	9	57	48	+9	61	
6	Gyirmót	38	17	9	12	59	46	+13	60	
7	Pécs	38	14	16	8	38	31	+7	58	
8	Siófok	38	15	11	12	45	51	−6	56	
9	Haladás	38	14	9	15	54	56	−2	51	
10	Budafok	38	12	11	15	39	46	−7	47	
11	Tiszakécske	38	13	7	18	38	50	−12	46	
12	Mosonmagyaróvár	38	12	10	16	36	44	−8	46	
13	Győr	38	11	13	14	37	42	−5	46	
14	Kazincbarcika	38	12	9	17	41	56	−15	45	
15	Csákvár	38	9	15	14	44	50	−6	42	
16	Kozármisleny (O)	38	11	8	19	46	63	−17	41	Qualification for relegation play-offs
17	Szentlőrinc (R)	38	9	12	17	44	58	−14	39	Qualification for relegation play-offs
18	Nyíregyháza (O)	38	9	11	18	46	55	−9	38	Qualification for relegation play-offs
19	Békéscsaba (R)	38	8	13	17	47	56	−9	37	Relegation to Nemzeti Bajnokság III
20	Dorog (R)	38	7	10	21	32	61	−29	31	Relegation to Nemzeti Bajnokság III

Source: Hungarian Football Federation (in Hungarian), Soccerway
Rules for classification: 1) Points; 2) Matches won; 3) Goal difference; 4) Goals scored; 5) Head-to-head points; 6) Head-to-head goal difference; 7) Fair play ranking; 8) Drawing of lots.
(C) Champions; (O) Play-off winners; (P) Promoted; (R) Relegated

== Season statistics ==
=== Hat-tricks ===
Player	For	Against	Result	Date	Round
(Hungary) Márkó Futács	MTK Budapest	Dorog	5–2	14 August 2022	3
(Hungary) Patrik Nagy	Gyirmót	Mosonmagyaróvár	3–1	14 August 2022	5
(Hungary) Krisztián Németh	MTK Budapest	Mosonmagyaróvár	6–0	28 August 2022	6
(Hungary) Péter Beke	Budafok	Kazincbarcika	4–0	5 February 2023	22

== Relegation play-offs ==
The relegation play-offs were played on 28 May and 4 June 2023.

=== Overview ===
Team 1	Agg.	Team 2	1st leg	2nd leg
Kozármisleny	3–1	Iváncsa	0–1	3–0
Veszprém	0–1	Nyíregyháza	0–0	0–1
BVSC-Zugló	2–1	Szentlőrinc	0–0	2–1

=== Matches ===
All times Central European Summer Time (UTC+2)

28 May 2023
17:30

Kozármisleny	0–1	Iváncsa
	Report	Suszter 85'

Kozármislenyi Stadion, Kozármisleny
Attendance: 950
Referee: Marcell Derdák
4 June 2023
17:00

Iváncsa	0–3	Kozármisleny
	Report	Daru 35', 61'; Bor 90'

Károlyi István Sporttelep, Iváncsa
Attendance: 1,100
Referee: Balázs Berke

Kozármisleny won 3–1 on aggregate, both teams remained in the league respectively.

28 May 2023
17:30

Veszprém	0–0	Nyíregyháza
	Report

Városi Stadion, Ajka
Attendance: 2,500
Referee: Mihály Káprály
4 June 2023
17:30

Nyíregyháza	1–0	Veszprém
Csősz 9'	Report

Várkerti Stadion, Kisvárda
Attendance: 2,200
Referee: Gergő Bogár

Nyíregyháza won 1–0 on aggregate, both teams remained in the league respectively.

28 May 2023
17:30

BVSC–Zugló	0–0	Szentlőrinc
	Report

Szőnyi úti Stadion, Budapest
Attendance: 1,000
Referee: Márton Rúsz
4 June 2023
17:00

Szentlőrinc	1–2	BVSC–Zugló
Novák 82'	Report	Szilágyi 73' (pen.); Horváth 88'

Szentlőrinci Sporttelep, Szentlőrinc
Attendance: 800
Referee: Ferenc Karakó

BVSC–Zugló won 2–1 on aggregate and promoted to NB II, whereas Szentlőrinc was relegated to NB III.

== See also ==
- 2022–23 Magyar Kupa
- 2022–23 Nemzeti Bajnokság I
- 2022–23 Nemzeti Bajnokság III
- 2022–23 Megyei Bajnokság I
