= Székkutas railway station =

Railway station in Hungary

Székkutas
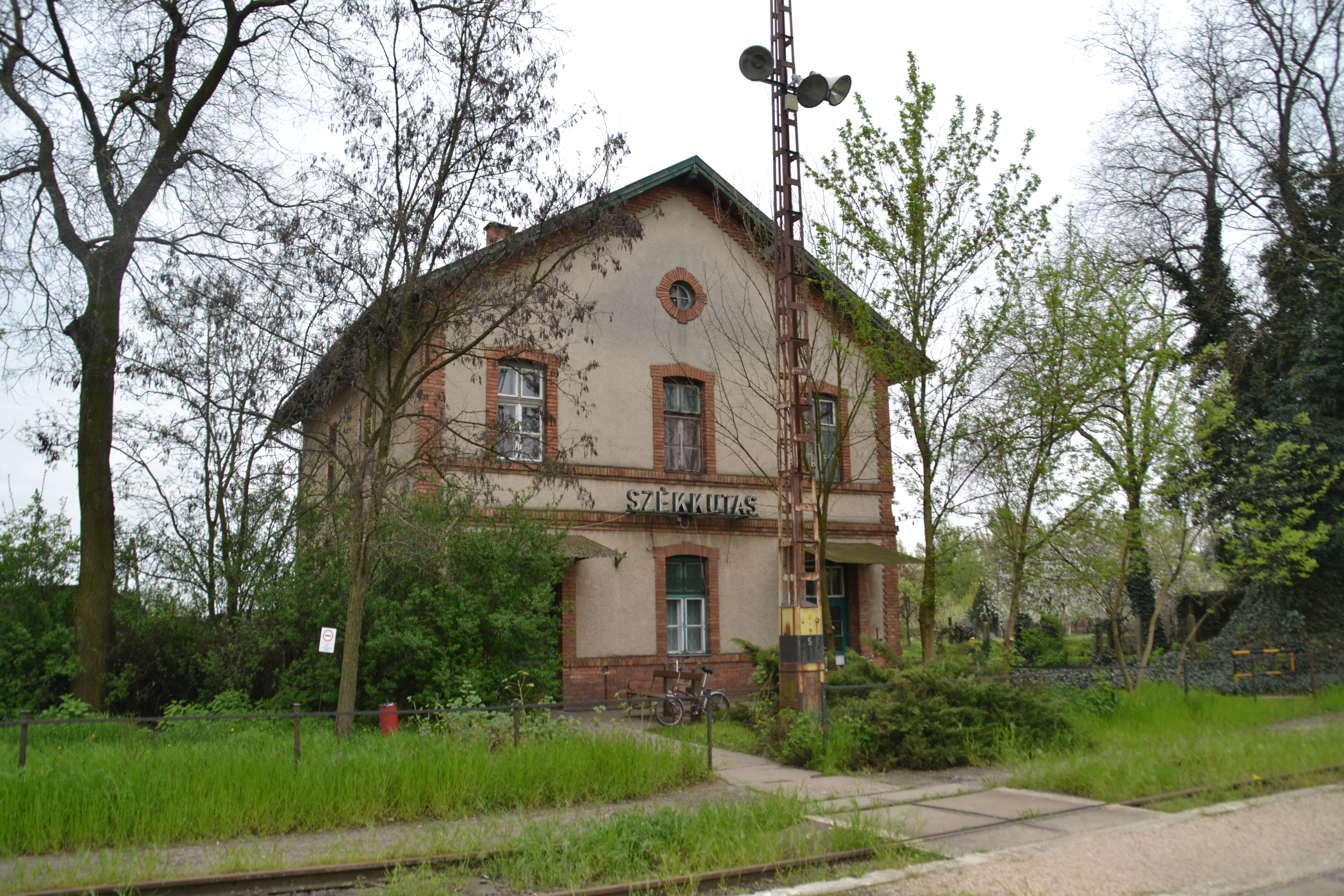

General information
- Location: Székkutas; Hungary
- Coordinates: 46°30′15″N 20°32′28″E
- Line: Szeged-Békéscsaba railway line
- Tracks: 3
- Train operators: MÁV START

History
- Opened: 1870

Services
| Preceding station | MÁV START | Following station |
|---|---|---|
| Kútvölgy towards Szeged | Személyvonat | Orosháza towards Békéscsaba |
Location

Székkutas railway station (Hungarian: Székkutas vasútállomás) is a railway station in the village of Székkutas, Csongrád-Csanád County, Hungary. It is located on the Szeged-Békéscsaba railway line.

== Services ==
As of the July 2023 timetable change, the following services stop at Székkutas:

- Személyvonat: service every two hours between Szeged and Békéscsaba.
