= Ócsárd =

- Village
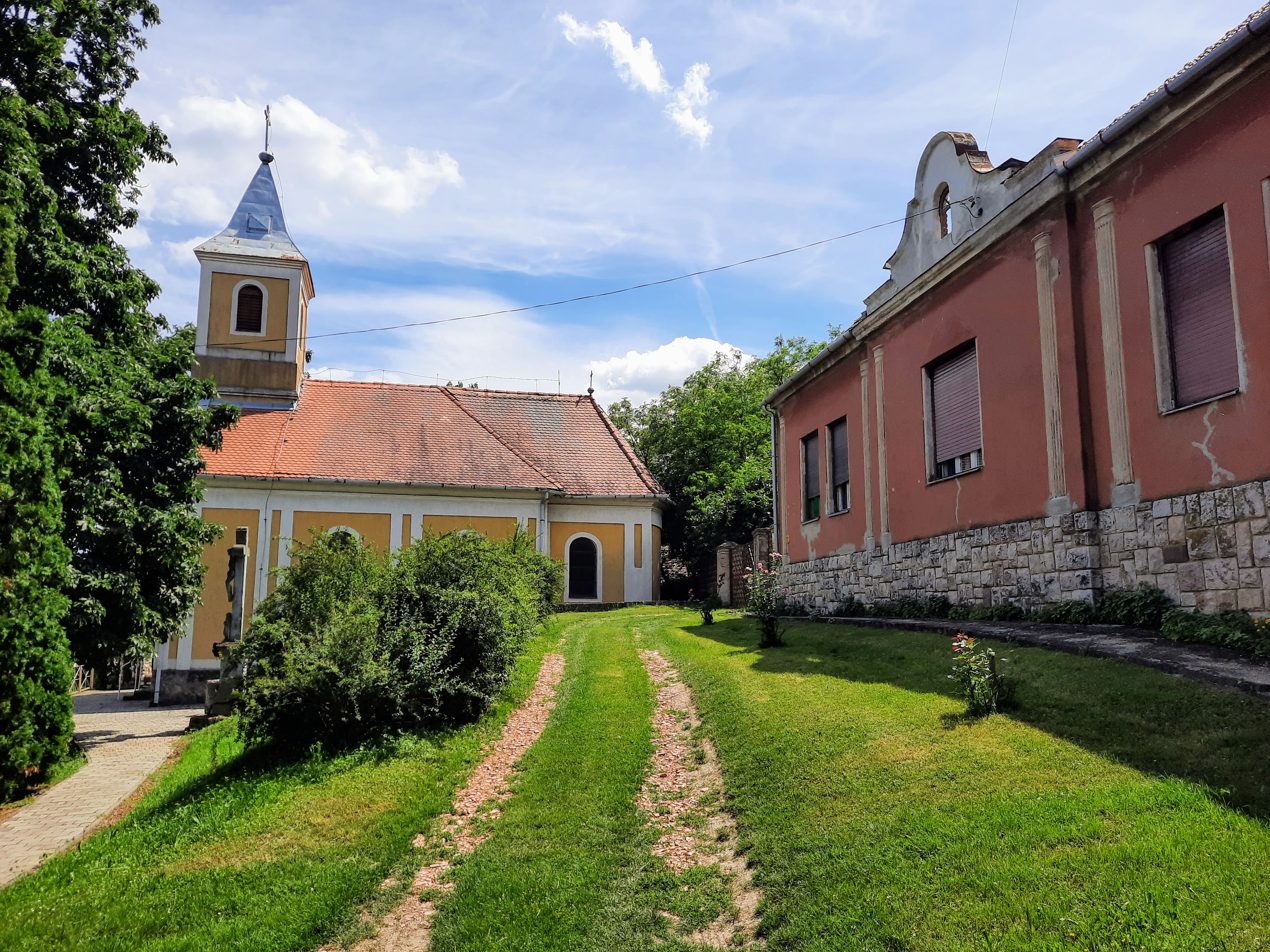
- Interactive map of Ócsárd
- Coordinates: 45°56′N 18°09′E
- Country: Hungary
- County: Baranya

Population (2025)
  - Total: 352
- Time zone: UTC+1 (CET)
  - Summer (DST): UTC+2 (CEST)

Ócsárd is a village in Baranya county, Hungary.
