= Kadarkút =

- Town
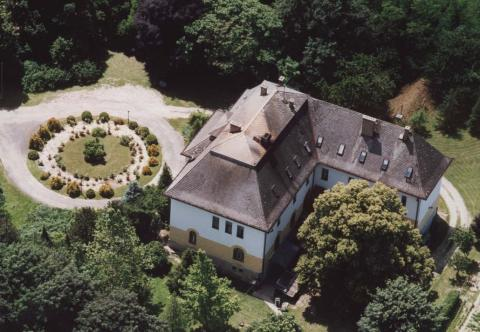
- Somssich Mansion in Kadarkút

- Flag Coat of arms

- Location of Kadarkút
- Coordinates: 46.23156°N 17.61939°E
- Country: Hungary
- Region: Southern Transdanubia
- County: Somogy
- District: Kaposvár
- RC Diocese: Kaposvár

Area
  - Total: 39.74 km^{2} (15.34 sq mi)

Population (2023)
  - Total: 2,318
  - Density: 58.33/km^{2} (151.1/sq mi)
- Demonym: kadarkúti
- Time zone: UTC+1 (CET)
  - Summer (DST): UTC+2 (CEST)
- Postal code: 7530
- Area code: (+36) 82
- Patron Saint: Holy Trinity
- NUTS 3 code: HU232
- MP: László Szászfalvi (KDNP)
- Website: Kadarkút Online

Kadarkút is a town in Somogy county, Hungary.

== History ==
According to László Szita the settlement was completely Hungarian in the 18th century.

== Demographics ==
As of 2022, the town's inhabitants were 89.9% Hungarian, 2.4% Gypsy, 0.5% German, and 1.5% of non-European origin. They were 36.5% Roman Catholic, and 8.4% Reformed.

== Twin towns — sister cities ==
Kadarkút is twinned with:

- Veliko Trojstvo, Croatia (2006)
- Voitsberg, Austria (2008)
