= Söpte =

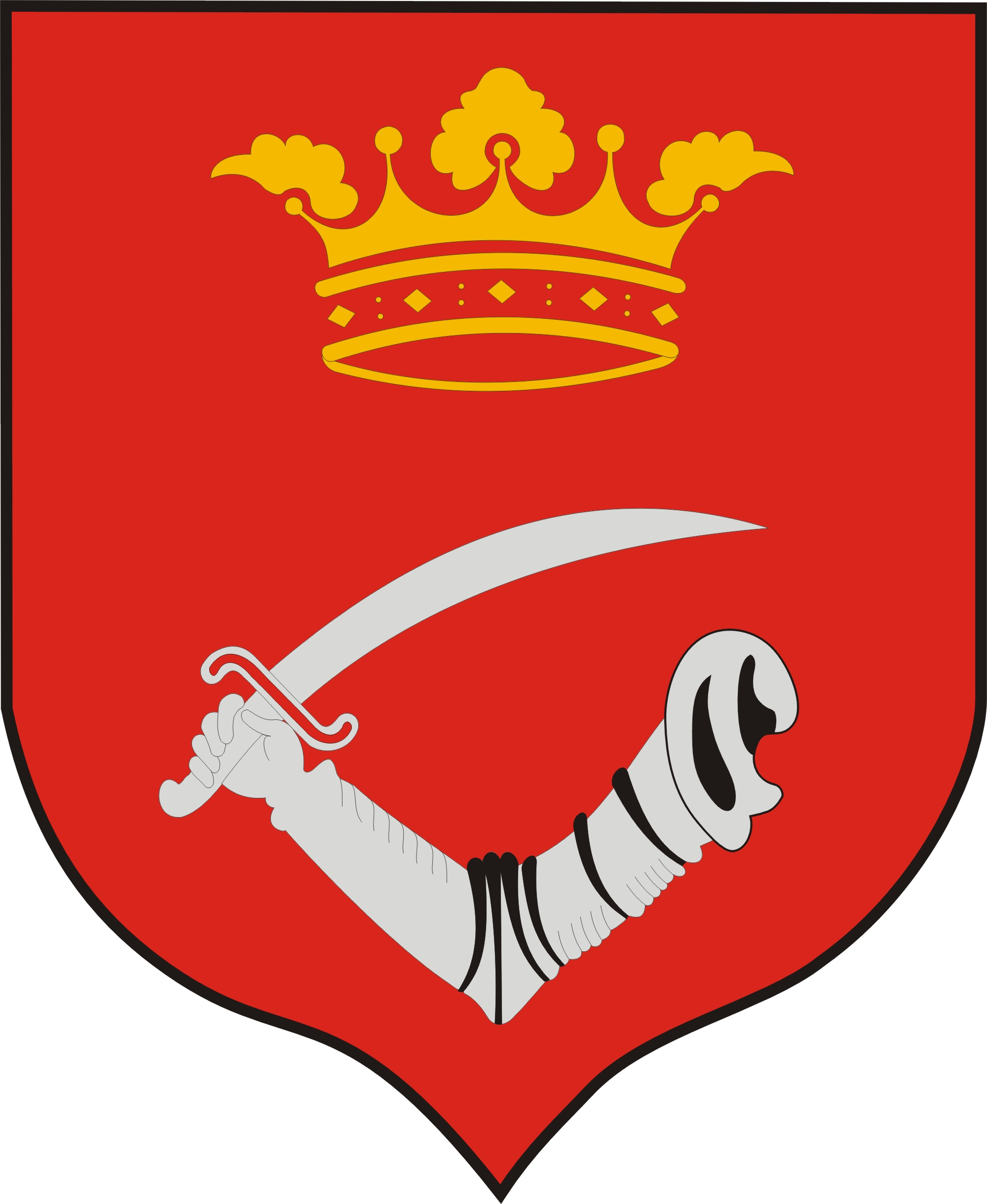
- Coat of arms

- Location of Söpte in Hungary
- Coordinates: 47°16′55″N 16°39′04″E
- Country: Hungary
- Region: Western Transdanubia
- County: Vas
- Subregion: Szombathelyi
- Rank: Village

Area
  - Total: 13.98 km^{2} (5.40 sq mi)

Population (January 1, 2008)
  - Total: 808
  - Density: 57.8/km^{2} (150/sq mi)
- Time zone: UTC+1 (CET)
  - Summer (DST): UTC+2 (CEST)
- Postal code: 9743
- Area code: +36 94
- KSH code: 24800
- Website: www.sopte.hu

Söpte is a village in Vas county, Hungary.

== Location ==
The village lies on the north-west part of the Gyöngyös-plain, 6 km north-east to Szombathely, by the Kozár creek.

== History ==
The name of the village Septhe appears first in 1268. Area was already inhabited in prehistoric times, as proved by Stone Age artifacts found here. In the part of its border "Rétszeri" fortifications and traces of Roman buildings are located. In the area of Kazár-major stand a small rectangular stronghold, its origin is controversial. Scepche in 1361, in 1409 Septhe, in 1462 Sewpthe as listed in the written sources. In the on 1579th December 15, dated donation letter of King Rudolf received Balazs Domján Koltai and his wife, Kate Bessenyei – with others – the half of the village Söpte with the inherited mansions together. In 1698 248 inhabitants. In 1787 lived 333 people in 44 houses.

== Places of interest ==
- Roman Catholic church dedicated to St. Martin built in 1725.
- Castle of family Guary.
