= Székkutas =

- Village
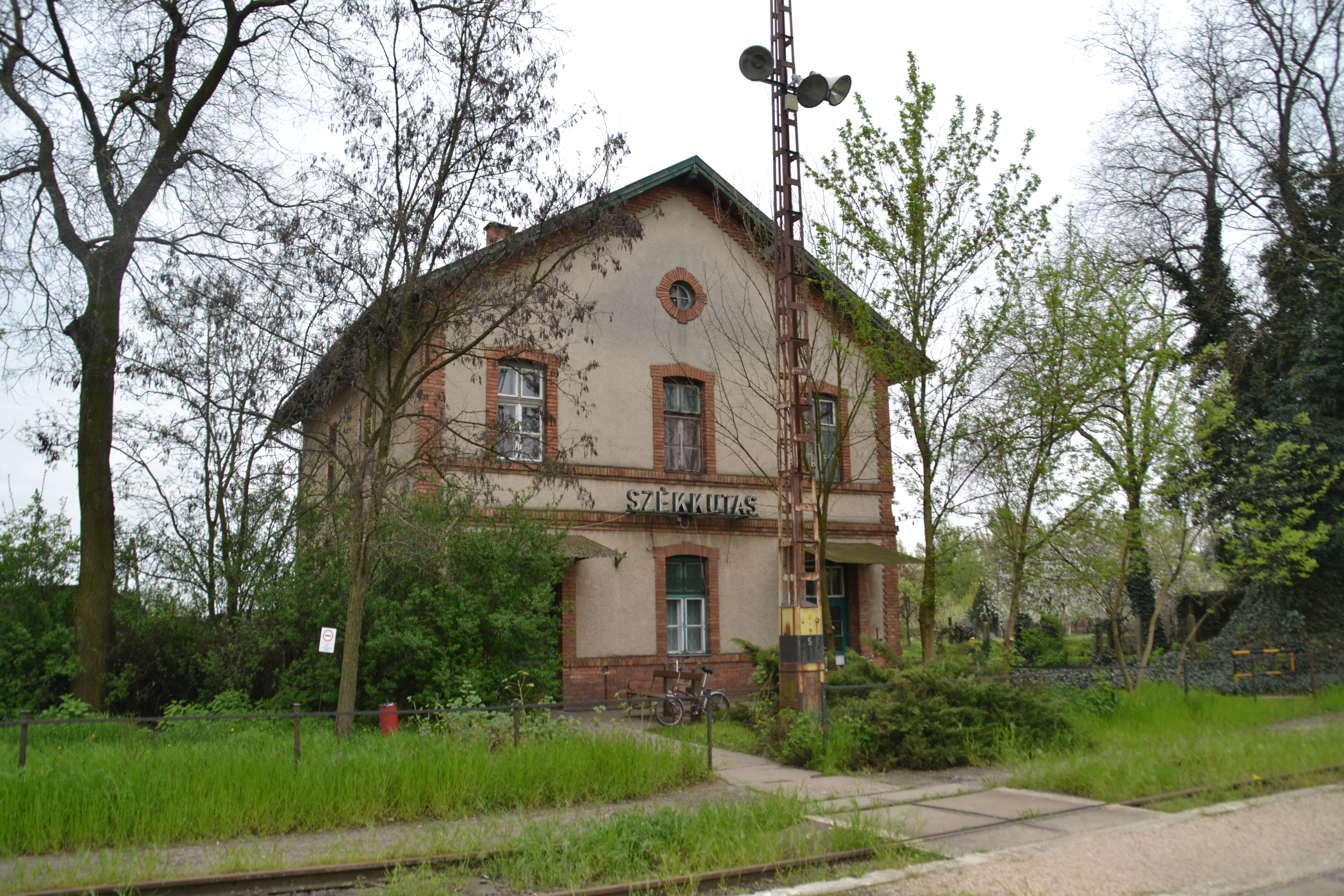
- Railway station in Székkutas

- Coat of arms

- Location in Hungary
- Coordinates: 46°30′N 20°32′E
- Country: Hungary
- County: Csongrád

Area
  - Total: 123.99 km^{2} (47.87 sq mi)

Population (1 January 2015)
  - Total: 2,071
  - Density: 16.7/km^{2} (43/sq mi)
- Time zone: UTC+1 (CET)
  - Summer (DST): UTC+2 (CEST)
- Postal code: 6821
- Area code: 62

Székkutas (historically Hódmezővásárhely-Kutasipuszta) is a village in Csongrád county, in the Southern Great Plain region of southern Hungary. It has a stop on the Szeged-Békéscsaba railway line.
