= Nagydobos =

Coordinates: 48°03′N 22°19′E

- Village
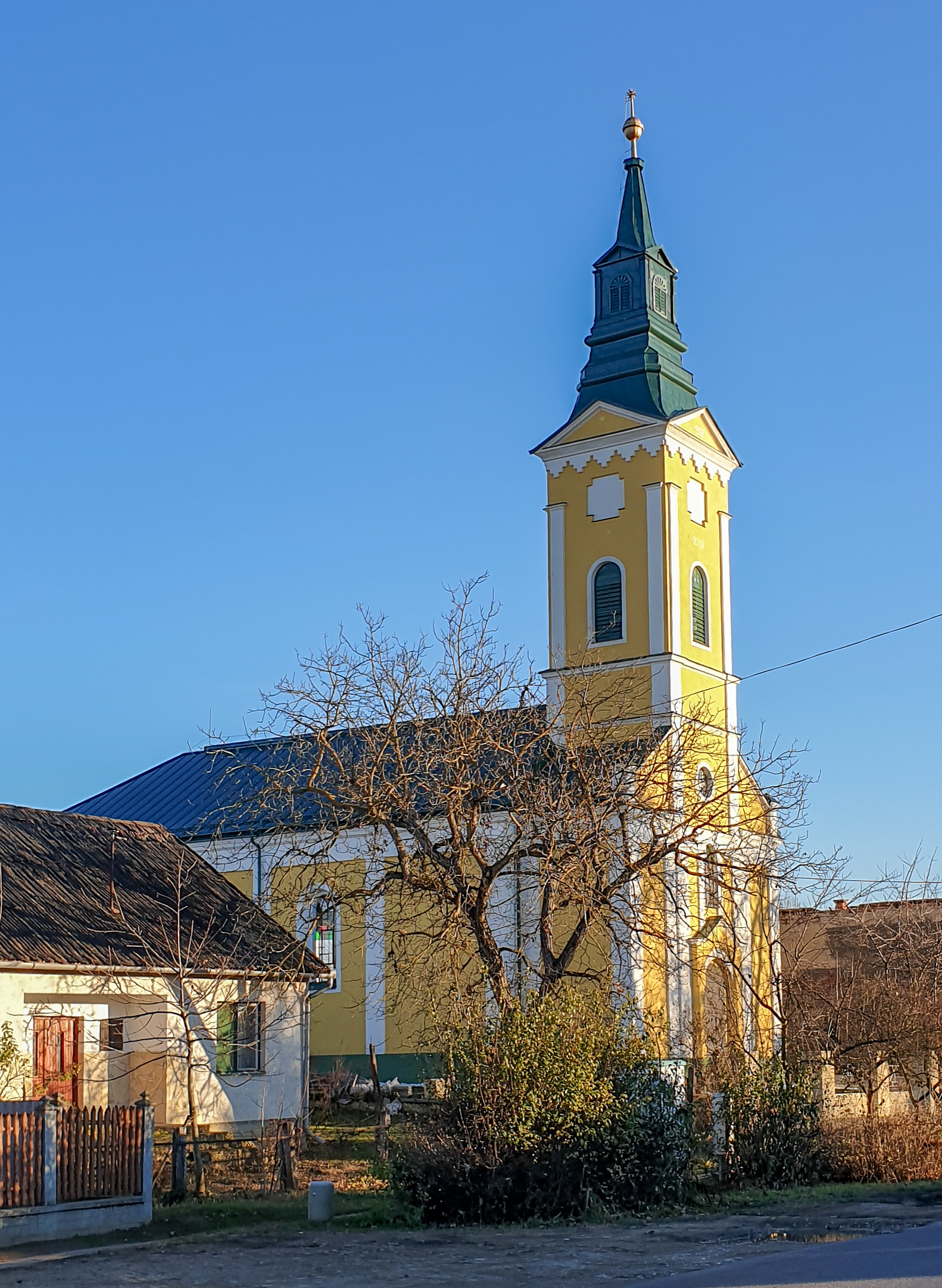
- Reformed church in Nagydobos
- Interactive map of Nagydobos
- Country: Hungary
- County: Szabolcs-Szatmár-Bereg

Area
  - Total: 26.93 km^{2} (10.40 sq mi)

Population (2015)
  - Total: 2,222
  - Density: 82.5/km^{2} (214/sq mi)
- Time zone: UTC+1 (CET)
  - Summer (DST): UTC+2 (CEST)
- Postal code: 4823
- Area code: 44

Location of Szabolcs-Szatmar-Bereg county in Hungary

Nagydobos is a village in Szabolcs-Szatmár-Bereg county, in the Northern Great Plain region of eastern Hungary.

== Geography ==
It covers an area of 26.93 km^{2} (10 sq mi) and has a population of 2222 people (2015).

== Demographics ==
As of 2022, the population was 95.4% Hungarian, 5.9% Gypsy, and 0.2% Ukrainian. The population was 39.1% Reformed, 12.2% Greek Catholic, and 2.5% Roman Catholic.
