= Mezőörs =

- Flag Coat of arms

- Location of Győr-Moson-Sopron county in Hungary

- Location of Mezőörs
- Coordinates: 47.56792°N 17.88233°E
- Country: Hungary
- County: Győr-Moson-Sopron

Area
  - Total: 48.48 km^{2} (18.72 sq mi)

Population (2004)
  - Total: 998
  - Density: 20.58/km^{2} (53.3/sq mi)
- Time zone: UTC+1 (CET)
  - Summer (DST): UTC+2 (CEST)
- Postal code: 9097
- Area code: 96

Mezőörs is a village in Győr-Moson-Sopron county, Hungary.
