= Monostorpályi =

Coordinates: 47°24′N 21°47′E

- Coat of arms
- Interactive map of Monostorpályi
- Country: Hungary
- County: Hajdú-Bihar

Area
  - Total: 44.44 km^{2} (17.16 sq mi)

Population (2015)
  - Total: 2,136
  - Density: 48.1/km^{2} (125/sq mi)
- Time zone: UTC+1 (CET)
  - Summer (DST): UTC+2 (CEST)
- Postal code: 4275
- Area code: 52

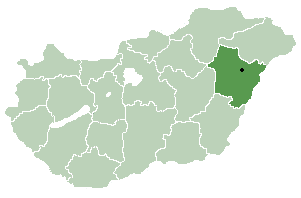
Location of Hajdú-Bihar county in Hungary

Monostorpályi is a village in Hajdú-Bihar county, in the Northern Great Plain region of eastern Hungary.

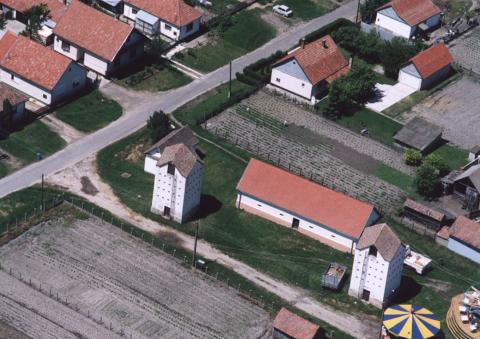
Aerial photography of Monostorpályi

== Geography ==
It covers an area of 44.44 km^{2} (17 sq mi) and has a population of 2136 people (2015).
