= Ádám Czékus =

Hungarian footballer (born 2003)

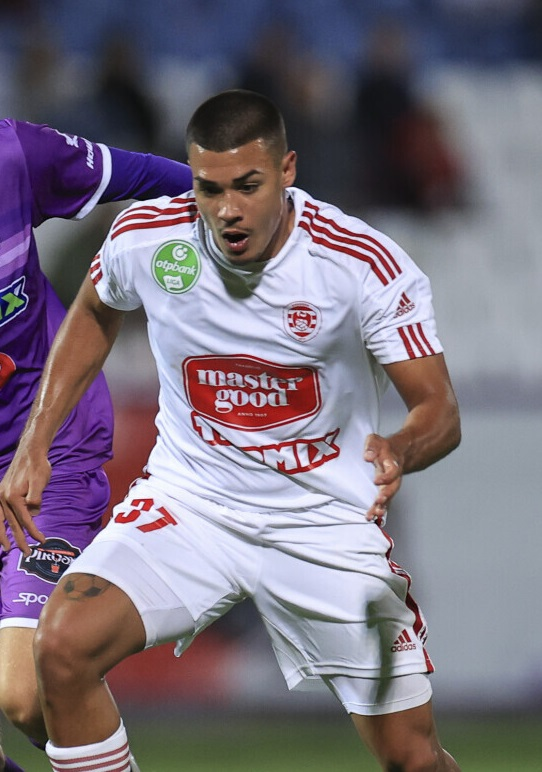
- Czékus playing for Kisvárda in 2023

Personal information
- Date of birth: 1 February 2003 (age 23)
- Place of birth: Vrbas, FR Yugoslavia
- Height: 1.78 m (5 ft 10 in)
- Position: Striker

Team information
- Current team: FK Csíkszereda
- Number: 17

Youth career
- –2002: TSC
- 2016–2017: Szeged
- 2017–2019: Budapest Honvéd
- 2019–2022: Ferencváros

Senior career*
Years	Team	Apps	(Gls)
2021–2022	Ferencváros II	15	(2)
2022–2023	Békéscsaba	36	(10)
2022	Békéscsaba II	1	(0)
2023–2025	Kisvárda	9	(1)
2023	Kisvárda II	4	(1)
2024	→ Tiszakécske (loan)	10	(0)
2024–2025	→ Békéscsaba (loan)	25	(9)
2025–2026	Kecskemét	26	(1)
2026–	FK Csíkszereda	11	(2)
- * Club domestic league appearances and goals as of 30 October 2026

Ádám Czékus (Serbian Cyrillic: Адам Чекус, romanized: Adam Čekus; born 1 February 2003) is a professional footballer who plays as a striker for Liga I club FK Csíkszereda.

== Career ==
Born in Vrbas, Czékus began his youth career with TSC before continuing his development in Hungary. During his senior career, he played for Szeged, Honvéd, Ferencváros, and Békéscsaba, featuring in both the second and third tiers of Hungarian football. In the 2022–23 season with Békéscsaba in the Nemzeti Bajnokság II, he made 36 appearances and scored ten goals, finishing as the club's top scorer. On 19 June 2023, he signed with Nemzeti Bajnokság I side Kisvárda.

On 12 June 2025, Czékus joined recently relegated Nemzeti Bajnokság II side Kecskemét as part of a transfer deal that saw Krisztián Nagy move to Kisvárda.

In June 2026, Czékus signed for Liga I side FK Csíkszereda on a free.

== Career statistics ==
As of match played 30 October 2026

Appearances and goals by club, season and competition
Club	Season	League			National Cup (Note: Includes Magyar Kupa, Cupa României)		Europe		Other		Total	
Club	Season	Division	Apps	Goals	Apps	Goals	Apps	Goals	Apps	Goals	Apps	Goals
Ferencváros II	2021–22	Nemzeti Bajnokság III	15	2	—		—		—		15	2
Békéscsaba	2022–23	Nemzeti Bajnokság II	36	10	2	2	—		—		38	12
Békéscsaba II	2022–23	Nemzeti Bajnokság III	1	0	—		—		—		1	0
Kisvárda	2023–24	Nemzeti Bajnokság I	9	1	2	1	—		—		11	2
Kisvárda II	2023–24	Nemzeti Bajnokság III	4	1	—		—		—		4	1
Tiszakécske (loan)	2023–24	Nemzeti Bajnokság II	10	0	1	0	—		—		11	0
Békéscsaba (loan)	2024–25	Nemzeti Bajnokság II	25	9	1	0	—		—		26	9
Kecskemét	2025–26	Nemzeti Bajnokság II	26	1	4	1	—		—		30	2
FK Csíkszereda	2026–27	Liga I	11	2	2	0	—		—		13	2
Career total			137	26	12	4	—		—		149	30
