= Raymond Lukács =

Romanian footballer

Personal information
- Full name: Raymond Barna Lukács
- Date of birth: 30 May 1988 (age 38)
- Place of birth: Oradea, Romania
- Height: 1.84 m (6 ft 0 in)
- Position: Forward

Team information
- Current team: Diosig Bihardiószeg
- Number: 88

Youth career
- 1998–2004: FC Oradea

Senior career*
Years	Team	Apps	(Gls)
2004–2010	Bihor Oradea	103	(34)
2010–2013	Astra Ploiești	8	(1)
2010–2011	Astra II Ploiești	13	(4)
2011	→ Politehnica Iași (loan)	6	(1)
2012	→ SC Bacău (loan)		
2012	→ Oșorhei (loan)		
2013–2015	Bihor Oradea	39	(16)
2015	Mezőkövesd	7	(0)
2015	Luceafărul Oradea	5	(1)
2016	Kazincbarcika	16	(6)
2016–2017	Salgótarján	31	(25)
2017–2018	Kisvárda	31	(9)
2018–2019	Kazincbarcika	51	(21)
2020–2023	Békéscsaba	98	(39)
2023	MSE Târgu Mureș	4	(1)
2024–	Diosig Bihardiószeg	13	(15)
- * Club domestic league appearances and goals as of 07:35, 22 June 2024 (UTC)

Raymond Barna Lukács (born 30 May 1988) is a Romanian professional footballer who plays as a forward for CS Diosig Bihardiószeg.

== Career ==
In his career, Lukács also played for teams such as: Bihor Oradea, Astra Ploiești, Salgótarján, Kisvárda or Kazincbarcika, among others.

== Personal life ==
His brother, Zsombor Lukács is also a footballer.
