= Kórház utcai Stadion =

Sports stadium in Békéscsaba, Hungary

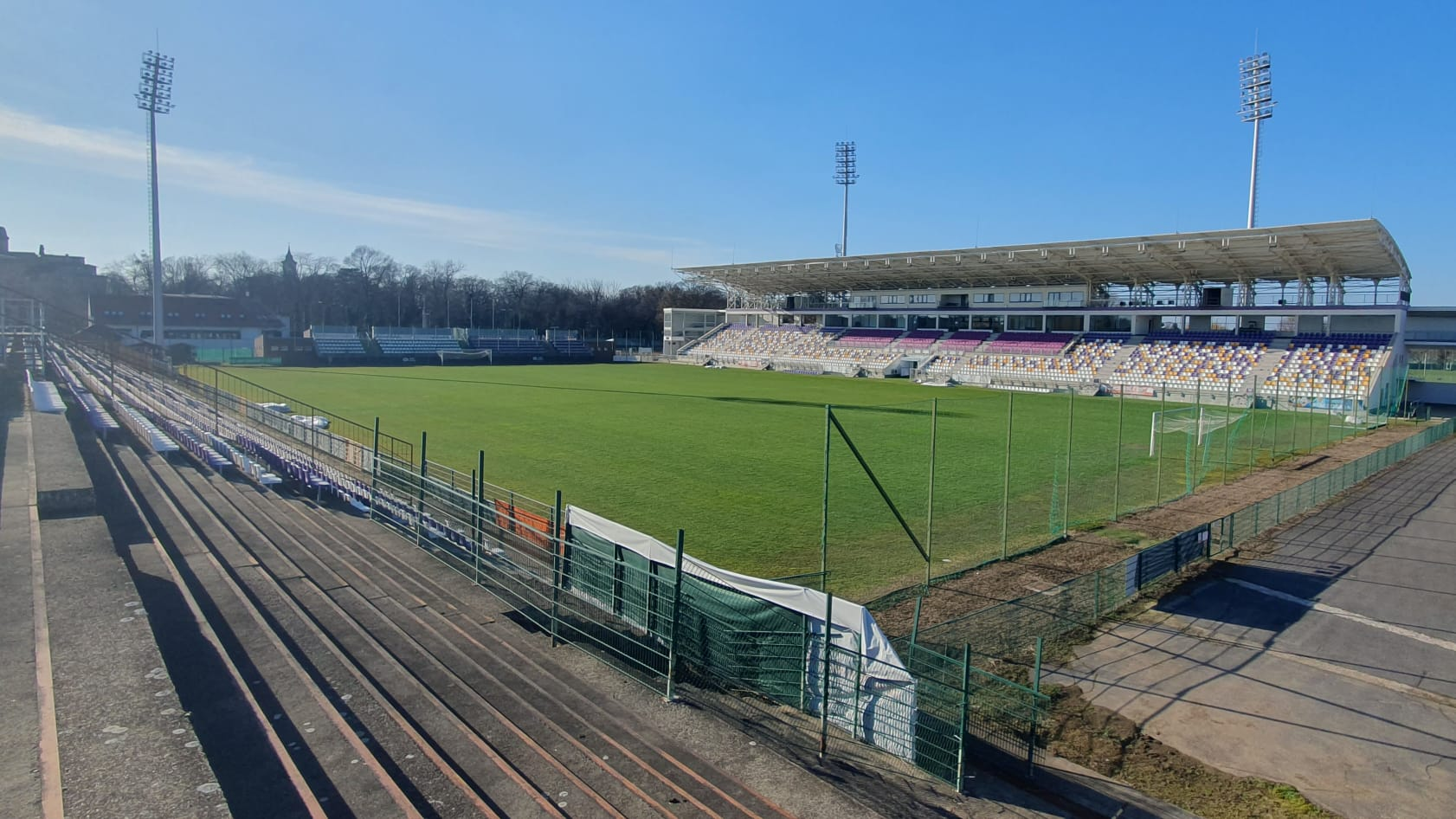
- Interactive map of Kórház utcai Stadion
- Location: Kórház utca 4-6. Békéscsaba, Hungary
- Coordinates: 46°41′10″N 21°06′18″E
- Owner: Békéscsaba MJV Önkormányzata
- Capacity: 4,963
- Field size: 105 by 70 metres (344 ft × 230 ft)

Construction
- Opened: 31 August 1974

Tenant
- Békéscsaba 1912 Előre SE

Kórház utcai Stadion is a sports stadium in Békéscsaba, Hungary. The stadium is home to association football side Békéscsaba 1912 Előre. The stadium has a capacity of 4,963

== History ==
On 4 December 2013, it was announced that Békéscsaba 1912 Előre will have 800 million HUF to spend on the reconstruction of the stadium. On 16 December 2014, according to the Magyar Közlöny Békéscsaba 1912 Előre will have 1 billion 125 million HUF to spend on the reconstruction of the new stadium. In 2015, 565 million HUF can be spent on the reconstruction.

On 6 January 2016, during the revision of the Nemzeti Stadionfejlesztési Program, the Hungarian government decided to increase the money by 325 million HUF that will be spent on the reconstruction of the stadium. The north-western stand will be demolished and a new stand will be built which will host 2500 spectators. During the reconstruction, the south-eastern stand will be covered. The reconstruction is expected to be finished by 2017.

== Attendance ==
=== Records ===
Record Attendance:

- 22,000 Békéscsaba v Ferencváros, May 10, 1975, (Nemzeti Bajnokság I)

== Gallery ==
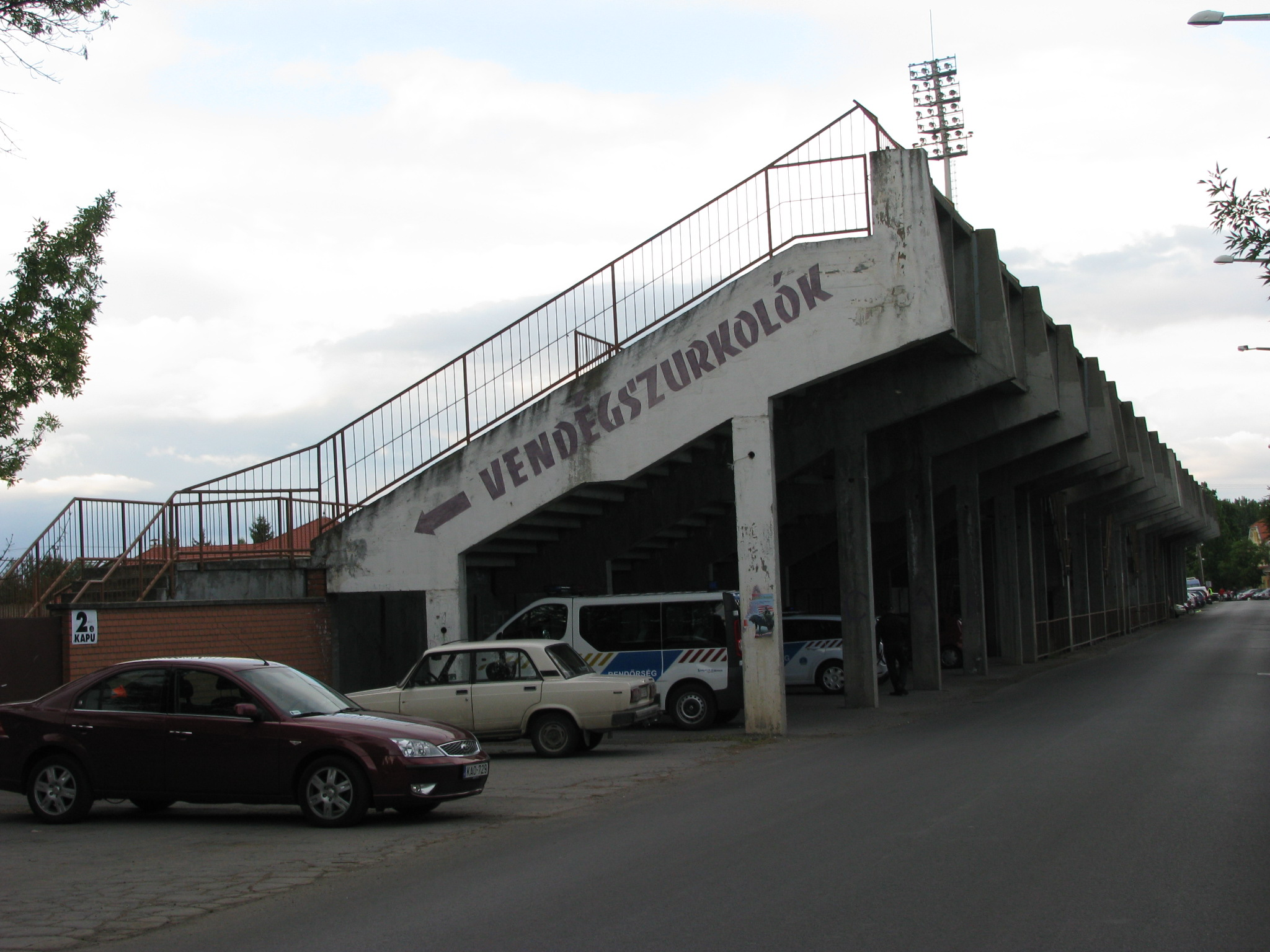
Away stand

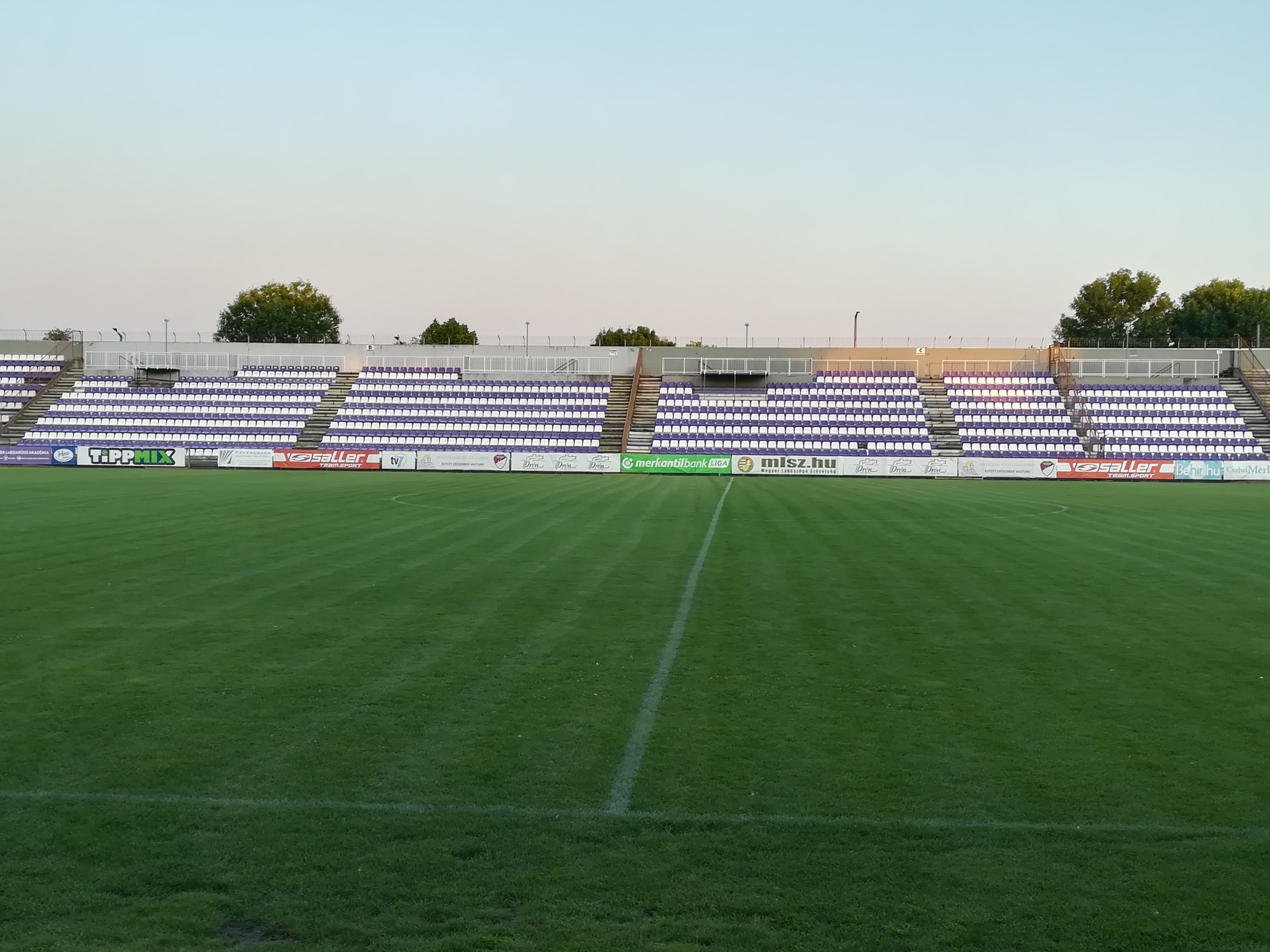
Second stand

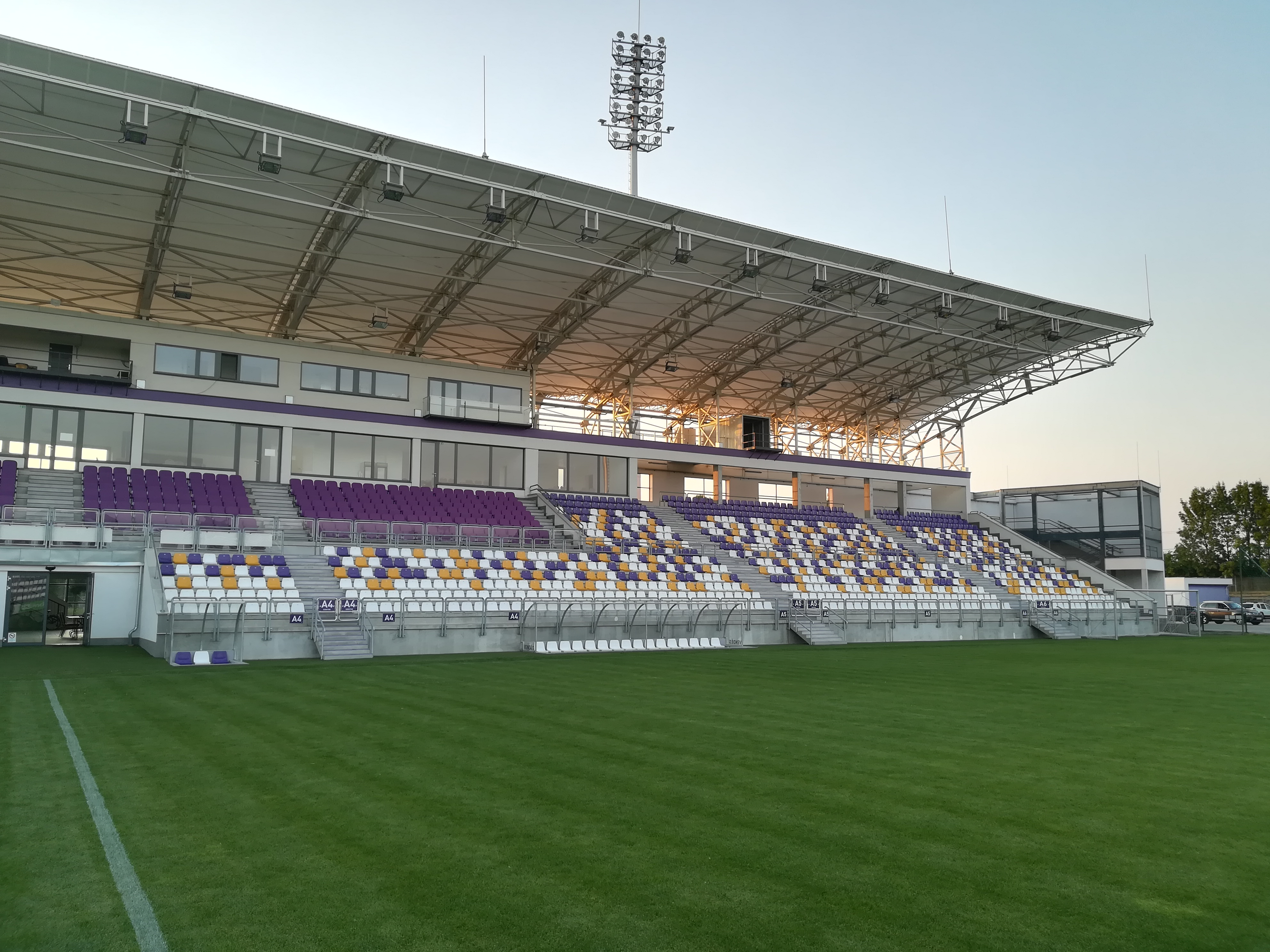
Main stand
