= 2022–23 Debreceni VSC season =

Debrecen
2022–23 season
- Chairman: Ike Thierry Zaengel
- Manager: João Janeiro (until 31 August); Tibor Dombi (caretaker, 31 August to 21 September); Srđan Blagojević (from 21 September)
- Stadium: Nagyerdei Stadion
- Nemzeti Bajnokság I: 3rd
- Magyar Kupa: Quarter-finals
- Top goalscorer: League: Dorian Babunski (13); All: Dorian Babunski (13)
- Highest home attendance: 13,004 vs Ferencváros (26 February 2023); Nemzeti Bajnokság I
- Lowest home attendance: 2,041 vs Paks (11 February 2023); Nemzeti Bajnokság I
- Average home league attendance: 4,996
- Biggest win: 4–0 vs Debreceni EAC (A) (19 October 2022); Magyar Kupa
- Biggest defeat: 2–4 vs Mezőkövesd (A) (22 August 2022); Nemzeti Bajnokság I 2–4 vs Zalaegerszeg (A) (30 August 2022); Nemzeti Bajnokság I 0–2 vs Ferencváros (A) (9 October 2022); Nemzeti Bajnokság I 0–2 vs Ferencváros (H) (26 February 2023); Nemzeti Bajnokság I 1–3 vs Puskás Akadémia (H) (2 March 2023); Magyar Kupa
Home colours	Away colours
- All statistics correct as of 12 March 2023.

The 2022–23 season is Debreceni Vasutas Sport Club's 44th competitive season, 2nd consecutive season in the Nemzeti Bajnokság I and 120th year in existence as a football club.In addition to the domestic league, Debrecen participated in this season's editions of the Magyar Kupa.

== Transfers ==
=== Summer ===
In: Note: Flags indicate national team as defined under FIFA eligibility rules; some limited exceptions apply. Players may hold more than one non-FIFA nationality.

No.	Pos.	Nation	Player
1	GK	ROU	Raul Bălbărău (from (Romania) Steaua București)
6	MF	GRE	Georgios Neofytidis (from (Slovakia) Zlaté Moravce)
14	DF	MNE	Meldin Drešković (from (Montenegro) Sutjeska Nikšić)
15	DF	ESP	Christian Manrique (from (Cyprus) Olympiakos Nicosia)
16	GK	HUN	Balázs Megyeri (from (Cyprus) AEL Limassol)
18	MF	HUN	Krisztofer Horváth (loan from (Italy) Torino)
19	FW	SEN	Matar Dieye (from (Croatia) Gorica)
21	DF	UKR	Oleksandr Romanchuk (from (Ukraine) Lviv)
40	LW	MAR	Karim Loukili (from (Latvia) Riga)
70	DF	HUN	Sámuel Major (from (Austria) Admira Wacker)
89	LW	GRE	Alexandros Kyziridis (from (Slovakia) Zlaté Moravce)
92	DF	GBS	Saná Gomes (from (Armenia) Noah)
94	DF	MNE	Dušan Lagator (from (Poland) Wisła Płock)
95	FW	NGR	Peter Olawale (from (Israel) Hapoel Ra'anana)
—	FW	CRO	Ante Erceg (from (Denmark) Brøndby)
—	GK	HUN	Péter Kovács (loan return from Szolnok)
—	DF	HUN	Benjámin Lakatos (loan return from Debreceni EAC)

Out: Note: Flags indicate national team as defined under FIFA eligibility rules; some limited exceptions apply. Players may hold more than one non-FIFA nationality.

No.	Pos.	Nation	Player
5	DF	HUN	Bence Pávkovics
6	DF	SRB	Marko Nikolić
8	MF	MKD	David Babunski
10	FW	HUN	Roland Ugrai (to (Turkey) Pendikspor)
15	MF	HUN	Gergő Gyönyörű (to Karcag)
18	DF	HUN	Attila Szujó (to Győri ETO)
20	MF	HUN	Ágoston Bényei (to Diósgyőr)
21	MF	HUN	Ádám Pintér (to Szeged)
24	DF	HUN	Patrik Poór (to MTK Budapest)
30	FW	HUN	Patrik Tischler (to Budafok)
65	FW	HUN	Norbert Kundrák (loan to Szeged)
69	DF	HUN	Mihály Korhut (to Debreceni EAC)
70	MF	HUN	Dominik Soltész (loan return to Budapest Honvéd)
86	GK	SVK	Tomáš Košický
—	GK	HUN	Péter Kovács (loan to Pécs)
—	FW	CRO	Ante Erceg (to (Croatia) Istra)
—	DF	HUN	Benjámin Lakatos (to Debreceni EAC)

=== Winter ===
In: Note: Flags indicate national team as defined under FIFA eligibility rules; some limited exceptions apply. Players may hold more than one non-FIFA nationality.

No.	Pos.	Nation	Player
—	MF	MNE	Stefan Lončar (from (Serbia) Novi Pazar)
—	FW	CRO	Antonio Mance (from (Croatia) Osijek)
—	MF	HUN	Tamás Farkas (from Debrecen II)
—	GK	HUN	Benedek Erdélyi (from Debrecen II)
—	MF	NGR	Hamzat Ojediran (from (Albania) Egnatia)
—	MF	TUR	Okan Aydın (from (Austria) Hartberg)
—	MF	HUN	Szabolcs Sipos (loan return from Szeged)
—	GK	SRB	Marko Milošević (from (Kazakhstan) Astana)
—	GK	HUN	Péter Kovács (from Pécs)

Out: Note: Flags indicate national team as defined under FIFA eligibility rules; some limited exceptions apply. Players may hold more than one non-FIFA nationality.

No.	Pos.	Nation	Player
18	MF	HUN	Krisztofer Horváth (loan return to (Italy) Torino)
25	DF	HUN	Nimród Baranyai (loan to Mezőkövesd)
40	LW	MAR	Karim Loukili (to (Cyprus) Karmiotissa)
42	GK	HUN	Alex Hrabina (to Nyíregyháza)
70	DF	HUN	Sámuel Major (loan to Pécs)
77	MF	HUN	Péter Baráth (loan to Ferencváros)
92	DF	GBS	Saná Gomes (loan to (Bulgaria) Beroe Stara Zagora)
96	DF	BRA	Charleston
99	GK	HUN	Dávid Gróf (to (Greece) Levadiakos)
—	FW	HUN	Balázs Rácz (loan to Szeged)

== Competitions ==
=== Overview ===
Competition	First match	Last match	Starting round	Final position	Record							
Competition	First match	Last match	Starting round	Final position	Pld	W	D	L	GF	GA	GD	Win %
Nemzeti Bajnokság I	31 July 2022	27 May 2023	Matchday 1	3rd	33	15	9	9	52	39	+13	45.45
Magyar Kupa	18 September 2022	2 March 2023	Round of 64	Quarter-finals	4	3	0	1	8	4	+4	75.00
Total					37	18	9	10	60	43	+17	48.65

Source: Competitions

=== Nemzeti Bajnokság I ===
==== League table ====
Pos	Team	Pld	W	D	L	GF	GA	GD	Pts	Qualification or relegation
1	Ferencváros (C)	33	19	6	8	62	33	+29	63	Qualification for the Champions League first qualifying round
2	Kecskemét	33	15	12	6	48	32	+16	57	Qualification for the Europa Conference League second qualifying round
3	Debrecen	33	15	9	9	52	39	+13	54	Qualification for the Europa Conference League second qualifying round
4	Puskás Akadémia	33	14	11	8	48	42	+6	53	
5	Paks	33	14	7	12	57	57	0	49	

Source: Hungarian Football Federation (in Hungarian), Soccerway
Rules for classification: 1) Points; 2) Matches won; 3) Goal difference; 4) Goals scored; 5) Head-to-head points; 6) Head-to-head goal difference; 7) Fair play ranking; 8) Drawing of lots.
(C) Champions

==== Results summary ====
Overall								Home						Away					
Pld	W	D	L	GF	GA	GD	Pts	W	D	L	GF	GA	GD	W	D	L	GF	GA	GD
33	15	9	9	52	39	+13	54	9	4	4	28	17	+11	6	5	5	24	22	+2

Source: Soccerway

==== Results by round ====
Round	1	2	3	4	5	6	7	8	9	10	11	12	13	14	15	16	17	18	19	20	21	22	23	24	25	26	27	28	29	30	31	32	33
Ground	A	H	H	A	H	A	H	A	H	A	H	H	A	A	H	A	H	A	H	A	H	A	A	H	H	A	H	A	H	A	H	A	H
Result	D	D	D	L	D	L	W	L	W	L	W	L	D	W	W	L	W	D	W	W	L	D	W	L	W	W	L	W	W	D	D	W	W
Position	4	7	8	12	11	12	8	10	9	9	7	7	8	7	6	7	5	5	5	4	4	4	3	5	4	4	4	4	4	4	4	3	3

Source: Matches
A = Away; H = Home; W = Win; D = Draw; L = Loss

==== Matches ====
31 July 2022 1	Kisvárda	2–2	Debrecen	Kisvárda
15:45 CEST (UTC+2)	Camaj 50' (pen.); Makowski 87'	Report	Dzsudzsák 85'; Bárány 90+3'	Stadium: Várkerti Stadion; Attendance: 2,870; Referee: Balázs Berke

6 August 2022 2	Debrecen	1–1	Kecskemét	Debrecen
20:00 CEST (UTC+2)	Bárány 67'	Report	Szabó 79' (pen.)	Stadium: Nagyerdei Stadion; Attendance: 4,724; Referee: Mihály Káprály

12 August 2022 3	Debrecen	1–1	Vasas	Debrecen
20:00 CEST (UTC+2)	Do. Babunski 86'	Report	Berecz 21'; Baráth (red card) 29'	Stadium: Nagyerdei Stadion; Attendance: 5,665; Referee: Gergő Bogár

22 August 2022 4	Mezőkövesd	4–2	Debrecen	Mezőkövesd
20:00 CEST (UTC+2)	Madarász 13'; Beširović 17', 66' (pen.); Dražić 34'; Cseke (red card) 81'	Report	Szécsi 6'; Bárány 47'	Stadium: Mezőkövesdi Városi Stadion; Attendance: 2,347; Referee: József Erdős

27 August 2022 5	Debrecen	1–1	Puskás Akadémia	Debrecen
19:45 CEST (UTC+2)	Dzsudzsák 21' (pen.)	Report	Zahedi 89'	Stadium: Nagyerdei Stadion; Attendance: 3,803; Referee: Balázs Berke

30 August 2022 6	Zalaegerszeg	4–2	Debrecen	Zalaegerszeg
20:00 CEST (UTC+2)	Németh 6'; Lesjak 65'; Ikoba 80'; Gergényi 86'	Report	Deslandes 60'; Bévárdi 90+2'	Stadium: ZTE Arena; Attendance: 2,128; Referee: István Vad

3 September 2022 7	Debrecen	1–0	Fehérvár	Debrecen
18:15 CEST (UTC+2)	Babunski 45+2'	Report		Stadium: Nagyerdei Stadion; Attendance: 5,014; Referee: Ferenc Karakó

10 September 2022 8	Paks	1–0	Debrecen	Paks
15:30 CEST (UTC+2)	Balogh 19'	Report		Stadium: Fehérvári úti Stadion; Attendance: 1,691; Referee: Ádám Farkas

1 October 2022 9	Debrecen	4–3	Budapest Honvéd	Debrecen
17:00 CEST (UTC+2)	Babunski 15'; Baráth 26'; Bódi 33'; Lagator 48'	Report	Domingues 53'; Samperio 70' (pen.); Jónsson 72'; Gomis (red card) 90+2'	Stadium: Nagyerdei Stadion; Attendance: 4,512; Referee: József Erdős

9 October 2022 10	Ferencváros	2–0	Debrecen	Budapest
18:00 CEST (UTC+2)	Vécsei 11'; Zachariassen 56'	Report		Stadium: Groupama Arena; Attendance: 10,857; Referee: Balázs Berke

16 October 2022 11	Debrecen	4–1	Újpest	Debrecen
13:45 CEST (UTC+2)	Dzsudzsák 18'; Sós 53'; Varga 77'; Baráth 90+1'	Report	Simon 32'	Stadium: Nagyerdei Stadion; Attendance: 6,114; Referee: Péter Antal

24 October 2022 12	Debrecen	2–3	Kisvárda	Debrecen
20:15 CEST (UTC+2)	Neofytidis 6'; Leoni 48' (o.g.)	Report	Makowski 37'; Kravchenko 57'; Navrátil 67'	Stadium: Nagyerdei Stadion; Attendance: 3,707; Referee: Balázs Berke

29 October 2022 13	Kecskemét	2–2	Debrecen	Kecskemét
17:00 CEST (UTC+2)	Nagy 12'; Banó-Szabó 47'	Report	Szécsi 55'; Varga 87'	Stadium: Széktói Stadion; Attendance: 2,527; Referee: Márió Görög

6 November 2022 14	Vasas	0–3	Debrecen	Budapest
15:15 CET (UTC+1)		Report	Dzsudzsák 10'; Szécsi 17'; Babunski 38'	Stadium: Illovszky Rudolf Stadion; Attendance: 2,654; Referee: István Vad

9 November 2022 15	Debrecen	1–0	Mezőkövesd	Debrecen
18:00 CET (UTC+1)	Sós 90+2'	Report		Stadium: Nagyerdei Stadion; Attendance: 3,565; Referee: Ádám Farkas

12 November 2022 16	Puskás Akadémia	2–1	Debrecen	Felcsút
14:15 CET (UTC+1)	Batik 18', 89'	Report	Dzsudzsák 41'	Stadium: Pancho Aréna; Attendance: 1,670; Referee: Bence Csonka

28 January 2023 17	Debrecen	3–0	Zalaegerszeg	Debrecen
17:00 CET (UTC+1)	Szécsi 2'; Dzsudzsák 36'; Babunski 53'	Report	Mocsi (red card) 35'	Stadium: Nagyerdei Stadion; Attendance: 2,811; Referee: Mihály Káprály

4 February 2023 18	Fehérvár	1–1	Debrecen	Székesfehérvár
19:30 CET (UTC+1)	Kodro 52', (yellow card) 87'	Report	Manrique (yellow card) 15'; Babunski 35'; Baráth (yellow card) 53'; Drešković (yellow card) 72'; Lagator (yellow card) 76'; Lončar (yellow card) 89'	Stadium: MOL Aréna Sóstó; Attendance: 1,689; Referee: József Erdős

11 February 2023 19	Debrecen	2–1	Paks	Debrecen
19:30 CET (UTC+1)	Drešković 90+2'; Babunski 90+5'	Report	Varga 57'	Stadium: Nagyerdei Stadion; Attendance: 2,041; Referee: Ferenc Karakó

19 February 2023 20	Budapest Honvéd	2–3	Debrecen	Budapest
17:30 CET (UTC+1)	Domingues 48'; Lukić 55'	Report	Babunski 27', 72'; Mance 86'	Stadium: Bozsik Aréna; Attendance: 4,938; Referee: Tamás Bognár

26 February 2023 21	Debrecen	0–2	Ferencváros	Debrecen
16:30 CET (UTC+1)	Mance (red card) 82'	Report	R. Mmaee 37', 79'	Stadium: Nagyerdei Stadion; Attendance: 13,004; Referee: Sándor Andó-Szabó

5 March 2023 22	Újpest	1–1	Debrecen	Budapest
18:30 CET (UTC+1)	Mudrinski 37'	Report	Pauljević 17' (o.g.); Manrique (red card) 60'	Stadium: Szusza Ferenc Stadion; Attendance: 3,189; Referee: Ferenc Karakó

11 March 2023 23	Kisvárda	0–1	Debrecen	Kisvárda
14:30 CET (UTC+1)		Report	Babunski 48'	Stadium: Várkerti Stadion; Attendance: 2,450; Referee: Mihály Káprály

18 March 2023 24	Debrecen	1–2	Kecskemét	Debrecen
15:45 CET (UTC+1)	Kyziridis (yellow card) 53'; Lončar (yellow card) 55', (goal) 61'	Report	Banó-Szabó (yellow card) 5'; Hadaró (yellow card) 59'; Szuhodovszki (yellow card) 62'; Deslandes 66' (o.g.); Horváth 80'	Stadium: Nagyerdei Stadion; Attendance: 5,114; Referee: Márton Rúsz

2 April 2023 25	Debrecen	3–1	Vasas	Debrecen
19:00 CEST (UTC+2)	Varga 34', 49'; Mance 44'; Manrique (yellow card) 72'	Report	Berecz 73' (pen.), (yellow card) 85'	Stadium: Nagyerdei Stadion; Attendance: 3,379; Referee: Csaba Pintér

7 April 2023 26	Mezőkövesd	0–1	Debrecen	Mezőkövesd
20:00 CEST (UTC+2)	Prudnikov (yellow card) 69'	Report	Lagator (yellow card) 37' (yellow-red card) 62'; Drešković 54'	Stadium: Mezőkövesdi Városi Stadion; Attendance: 2,126; Referee: Sándor Andó-Szabó

14 April 2023 27	Debrecen	0–1	Puskás Akadémia	Debrecen
20:00 CEST (UTC+2)	Manrique (yellow card) 23'; Hamzat (yellow card) 27'; Dzsudzsák (yellow card) 55'; Drešković (yellow card) 71'; Varga (yellow card) 79'; Ferenczi (red card) 89'	Report	Favorov (yellow card) 11'; Komáromi (yellow card) 25'; Golla (yellow card) 48'; Colley (yellow card) 89'; Zahedi 90+3'	Stadium: Nagyerdei Stadion; Attendance: 3,726; Referee: Tamás Bognár

23 April 2023 28	Zalaegerszeg	0–2	Debrecen	Zalaegerszeg
18:45 CEST (UTC+2)	Ikoba (yellow card) 55'	Report	Szécsi 35'; Bárány 84'; Bévárdi (yellow card) 90+1'	Stadium: ZTE Arena; Referee: Péter Zierkelbach

30 April 2023 29	Debrecen	2–0	Fehérvár	Debrecen
15:30 CEST (UTC+2)	Babunski 52'; Drešković (yellow card) 55'; Kusnyír (yellow card) 67'; Lončar (yellow card) 74'; Bódi 81'	Report	Makarenko (yellow card) 5'; Pokorný (yellow card) 74'; Larsen (red card) 85'; Szabó (yellow card) 90+1'	Stadium: Nagyerdei Stadion; Attendance: 6,561; Referee: Ferenc Karakó

6 May 2023 30	Paks	0–0	Debrecen	Paks
16:30 CEST (UTC+2)	Varga (yellow card) 42'; Papp (yellow card) 83'	Report	Manrique (yellow card) 9'; Lagator (yellow card) 42'; Babunski (yellow card) 83'; Dzsudzsák (yellow card) 88'	Stadium: Fehérvári úti Stadion; Attendance: 3,065; Referee: Balázs Berke

13 May 2023 31	Debrecen	0–0	Budapest Honvéd	Debrecen
17:00 CEST (UTC+2)	Lagator (yellow card) 90+1'; Mance (yellow card) 90+2'	Report	Zsótér (yellow card) 15'	Stadium: Nagyerdei Stadion; Attendance: 5,632; Referee: Gergő Bogár

20 May 2023 32	Ferencváros	1–3	Debrecen	Budapest
17:45 CEST (UTC+2)	Pászka 42'	Report	Babunski 63', 67'; Bódi 75' (pen.)	Stadium: Groupama Arena; Attendance: 15,879; Referee: József Erdős

27 May 2023 33	Debrecen	2–0	Újpest	Debrecen
20:00 CEST (UTC+2)	Lagator 27', (yellow card) 86'; Manrique 54'; Kusnyír (yellow card) 56'	Report	Gouré (yellow card) 18'; Pauljević (yellow card) 20'; Diaby (yellow card) 73'	Stadium: Nagyerdei Stadion; Attendance: 14,014; Referee: Gergő Bogár

=== Magyar Kupa ===
18 September 2022 Round of 64	Dabas	0–1	Debrecen	Dabas
15:00 CEST (UTC+2)		Report	Ferenczi 38'; Romanchuk (red card) 63'	Stadium: Wellis Sportpark; Attendance: 400; Referee: Tamás Takács

19 October 2022 Round of 32	Debreceni EAC	0–4	Debrecen	Debrecen
13:30 CEST (UTC+2)		Report	Sós 25'; Horváth 39'; Major 46'; Olawale 51'; Drešković (red card) 64'	Stadium: DEAC Stadion; Attendance: 1,000; Referee: László Lovas

8 February 2023 Round of 16	Győr	1–2 (a.e.t.)	Debrecen	Győr
19:00 CET (UTC+1)	Csinger 90+3'; Babati (red card) 89'	Report	Mance 45'; Lončar 105'	Stadium: ETO Park; Attendance: 770; Referee: Marcell Derdák

2 March 2023 Quarter-finals	Debrecen	1–3	Puskás Akadémia	Debrecen
20:00 CET (UTC+1)	Ferenczi 31'	Report	Gruber 1'; Levi 12'; Slagveer 85'	Stadium: Nagyerdei Stadion; Attendance: 3,811; Referee: Bence Csonka

== Statistics ==
=== Appearances and goals ===
Last updated on 12 March 2023.

No.	Pos	Nat	Player	Total		Nemzeti Bajnokság I		Magyar Kupa	
No.	Pos	Nat	Player	Apps	Goals	Apps	Goals	Apps	Goals
1	GK	(Serbia) SRB	Marko Milošević	3	-4	2	-1	1	-3
4	DF	(France) FRA	Sylvain Deslandes	14	1	13	1	1	0
6	MF	(Greece) GRE	Georgios Neofytidis	11	1	9	1	2	0
8	MF	(Hungary) HUN	Kevin Varga	3	0	2	0	1	0
10	MF	(Hungary) HUN	Balázs Dzsudzsák	25	6	23	6	2	0
11	DF	(Hungary) HUN	János Ferenczi	25	2	22	0	3	2
14	DF	(Montenegro) MNE	Meldin Drešković	17	1	14	1	3	0
15	DF	(Spain) ESP	Christian Manrique	16	0	12	0	4	0
16	GK	(Hungary) HUN	Balázs Megyeri	13	-15	11	-14	2	-1
17	FW	(Hungary) HUN	Donát Bárány	9	3	9	3	0	0
18	MF	(Nigeria) NGR	Ojediran Hamzat	3	0	3	0	0	0
19	FW	(Senegal) SEN	Matar Dieye	1	0	1	0	0	0
20	MF	(Montenegro) MNE	Stefan Lončar	9	1	7	0	2	1
21	DF	(Ukraine) UKR	Oleksandr Romanchuk	15	0	13	0	2	0
22	MF	(Hungary) HUN	Bence Sós	25	3	21	2	4	1
23	FW	(North Macedonia) MKD	Dorian Babunski	24	10	21	10	3	0
27	MF	(Hungary) HUN	Ádám Bódi	15	1	13	1	2	0
29	DF	(Hungary) HUN	Erik Kusnyír	14	0	12	0	2	0
30	MF	(Turkey) TUR	Okan Aydın	1	0	1	0	0	0
31	DF	(Hungary) HUN	Zsombor Bévárdi	20	1	16	1	4	0
33	MF	(Hungary) HUN	József Varga	23	2	21	2	2	0
37	MF	(Hungary) HUN	Tamás Farkas	2	0	1	0	1	0
45	FW	(Croatia) CRO	Antonio Mance	8	2	6	1	2	1
88	FW	(Hungary) HUN	Márk Szécsi	24	4	22	4	2	0
89	MF	(Greece) GRE	Alexandros Kyziridis	12	0	11	0	1	0
94	DF	(Montenegro) MNE	Dušan Lagator	19	1	16	1	3	0
95	FW	(Nigeria) NGR	Peter Olawale	5	1	4	0	1	1
Youth players:
1	GK	(Romania) ROU	Raul Bălbărău	0	0	0	-0	0	-0
12	GK	(Hungary) HUN	Benedek Erdényi	0	0	0	-0	0	-0
96	DF	(Hungary) HUN	Balázs Tordai	0	0	0	0	0	0
Out to loan:
25	DF	(Hungary) HUN	Nimród Baranyai	6	0	4	0	2	0
65	FW	(Hungary) HUN	Norbert Kundrák	2	0	2	0	0	0
70	DF	(Hungary) HUN	Sámuel Major	4	1	2	0	2	1
77	MF	(Hungary) HUN	Péter Baráth	17	2	15	2	2	0
92	DF	(Guinea-Bissau) GBS	Saná Gomes	5	0	4	0	1	0
Players no longer at the club:
18	FW	(Hungary) HUN	Krisztofer Horváth	9	1	7	0	2	1
40	FW	(Morocco) MAR	Karim Loukili	1	0	0	0	1	0
42	GK	(Hungary) HUN	Alex Hrabina	4	-6	4	-6	0	-0
96	DF	(Brazil) BRA	Charleston	6	0	5	0	1	0
99	GK	(Hungary) HUN	Dávid Gróf	7	-13	6	-13	1	-0

=== Top scorers ===
Includes all competitive matches. The list is sorted by shirt number when total goals are equal.

Position	Nation	Number	Name	Nemzeti Bajnokság I	Magyar Kupa	Total
1	(North Macedonia)	23	Dorian Babunski	13	0	13
2	(Hungary)	10	Balázs Dzsudzsák	6	0	6
3	(Hungary)	88	Márk Szécsi	5	0	5
4	(Hungary)	17	Donát Bárány	4	0	4
5	(Hungary)	22	Bence Sós	2	1	3
5	(Hungary)	27	Ádám Bódi	3	0	3
5	(Croatia)	45	Antonio Mance	2	1	3
8	(Hungary)	8	Kevin Varga	2	0	2
8	(Hungary)	11	János Ferenczi	0	2	2
8	(Montenegro)	14	Meldin Drešković	2	0	2
8	(Montenegro)	20	Stefan Lončar	1	1	2
8	(Hungary)	33	József Varga	2	0	2
8	(Hungary)	77	Péter Baráth	2	0	2
8	(Montenegro)	94	Dušan Lagator	2	0	2
15	(France)	4	Sylvain Deslandes	1	0	1
15	(Greece)	6	Georgios Neofytidis	1	0	1
15	(Spain)	15	Christian Manrique	1	0	1
15	(Hungary)	18	Krisztofer Horváth	0	1	1
15	(Hungary)	31	Zsombor Bévárdi	1	0	1
15	(Hungary)	70	Sámuel Major	0	1	1
15	(Nigeria)	95	Peter Olawale	0	1	1
/	/	/	Own Goals	2	0	2
			TOTALS	52	8	60

=== Disciplinary record ===
Includes all competitive matches. Players with 1 card or more included only.

Last updated on 12 March 2023

Position	Nation	Number	Name	Nemzeti Bajnokság I		Magyar Kupa		Total (Hu Total)	
Position	Nation	Number	Name	Yellow card	Red card	Yellow card	Red card	Yellow card	Red card
DF	(France)	4	Sylvain Deslandes	3	0	0	0	3 (3)	0 (0)
MF	(Greece)	6	Georgios Neofytidis	5	0	0	0	5 (5)	0 (0)
MF	(Hungary)	10	Balázs Dzsudzsák	3	0	0	0	3 (3)	0 (0)
DF	(Hungary)	11	János Ferenczi	4	0	1	0	5 (4)	0 (0)
DF	(Montenegro)	14	Meldin Drešković	2	0	0	1	2 (2)	1 (0)
DF	(Spain)	15	Christian Manrique	3	1	1	0	4 (3)	1 (1)
FW	(Hungary)	17	Donát Bárány	2	0	0	0	2 (2)	0 (0)
FW	(Hungary)	18	Krisztofer Horváth	1	0	0	0	1 (1)	0 (0)
MF	(Montenegro)	20	Stefan Lončar	1	0	1	0	2 (1)	0 (0)
DF	(Ukraine)	21	Oleksandr Romanchuk	0	0	0	1	0 (0)	1 (1)
MF	(Hungary)	22	Bence Sós	1	0	0	0	1 (1)	0 (0)
FW	(North Macedonia)	23	Dorian Babunski	3	0	0	0	3 (3)	0 (0)
DF	(Hungary)	25	Nimród Baranyai	1	0	0	0	1 (1)	0 (0)
MF	(Hungary)	27	Ádám Bódi	2	0	0	0	2 (2)	0 (0)
DF	(Hungary)	29	Erik Kusnyír	1	0	0	0	1 (1)	0 (0)
DF	(Hungary)	31	Zsombor Bévárdi	3	0	0	0	3 (3)	0 (0)
MF	(Hungary)	33	József Varga	2	0	0	0	2 (2)	0 (0)
GK	(Hungary)	42	Alex Hrabina	1	0	0	0	1 (1)	0 (0)
FW	(Croatia)	45	Antonio Mance	0	1	0	0	0 (0)	1 (1)
FW	(Hungary)	65	Norbert Kundrák	2	0	0	0	2 (2)	0 (0)
MF	(Hungary)	77	Péter Baráth	4	0	0	0	4 (4)	0 (0)
FW	(Hungary)	88	Márk Szécsi	3	0	0	0	3 (3)	0 (0)
LW	(Greece)	89	Alexandros Kyziridis	2	0	0	0	2 (2)	0 (0)
DF	(Guinea-Bissau)	92	Saná Gomes	2	0	0	0	2 (2)	0 (0)
DF	(Montenegro)	94	Dušan Lagator	5	0	1	0	6 (5)	0 (0)
DF	(Brazil)	96	Charleston	1	0	0	0	1 (1)	0 (0)
GK	(Hungary)	99	Dávid Gróf	1	0	0	0	1 (1)	0 (0)
			TOTALS	58	2	4	2	62 (58)	4 (2)

=== Clean sheets ===
Last updated on 8 April 2023

Position	Nation	Number	Name	Nemzeti Bajnokság I	Magyar Kupa	Total
1	(Hungary)	16	Balázs Megyeri	4	1	5
2	(Serbia)	1	Marko Milošević	1	0	1
3	(Hungary)	42	Alex Hrabina	1	0	1
4	(Hungary)	99	Dávid Gróf	0	1	1
5	(Romania)	1	Raul Bălbărău	0	0	0
6	(Hungary)	12	Benedek Erdélyi	0	0	0
			TOTALS	6	2	8
