= 2023–24 Debreceni VSC season =

Debrecen
2023–24 season
- Chairman: Ike Thierry Zaengel
- Manager: Srđan Blagojević
- Stadium: Nagyerdei Stadion
- Nemzeti Bajnokság I: 5th
- Magyar Kupa: Round of 16
- UEFA Europa Conference League: Third qualifying round
- Top goalscorer: League: Donát Bárány (8); All: Donát Bárány (10)
- Highest home attendance: 16,572 Rapid Vienna (17 August 2023); ECL (3QR)
- Lowest home attendance: 3,664 Mezőkövesd (2 March 2024); Nemzeti Bajnokság I (23)
- Average home league attendance: 5,973
- Biggest win: 5–1 vs Zalaegerszeg (H) (17 March 2024); Nemzeti Bajnokság I (25)
- Biggest defeat: 0–5 vs Rapid Vienna (H) (17 August 2023); ECL (3QR)
Home colours	Away colours
- All statistics correct as of 18 May 2024.

The 2023–24 season is Debreceni Vasutas Sport Club's 45th competitive season, 3rd consecutive season in the Nemzeti Bajnokság I and 121st year in existence as a football club. In addition to the domestic league, Debrecen participate in this season's editions of the Magyar Kupa and UEFA Europa Conference League.

== Transfers ==
=== Summer ===
In: Note: Flags indicate national team as defined under FIFA eligibility rules; some limited exceptions apply. Players may hold more than one non-FIFA nationality.

No.	Pos.	Nation	Player
67	FW	SUI	João Oliveira (from (Portugal) Leixões)

Out: Note: Flags indicate national team as defined under FIFA eligibility rules; some limited exceptions apply. Players may hold more than one non-FIFA nationality.

No.	Pos.	Nation	Player
33	MF	HUN	Péter Baráth (to Ferencváros)

== Competitions ==
=== Overview ===
Competition	First match	Last match	Starting round	Final position	Record							
Competition	First match	Last match	Starting round	Final position	Pld	W	D	L	GF	GA	GD	Win %
Nemzeti Bajnokság I	31 July 2023	18 May 2024	Matchday 1	5th	33	14	6	13	49	48	+1	42.42
Magyar Kupa	16 September 2023	28 February 2024	Round of 64	Round of 16	3	2	1	0	4	2	+2	66.67
UEFA Europa Conference League	27 July 2023	17 August 2023	Second qualifying round	Third qualifying round	4	1	1	2	2	7	−5	25.00
Total					40	17	8	15	55	57	−2	42.50

Last updated: 18 May 2024
Source: Competitions

=== Nemzeti Bajnokság I ===
==== League table ====
Pos	Team	Pld	W	D	L	GF	GA	GD	Pts	Qualification or relegation
3	Puskás Akadémia	33	15	10	8	60	35	+25	55	Qualification for the Conference League second qualifying round
4	Fehérvár	33	16	6	11	55	40	+15	54	Qualification for the Conference League second qualifying round
5	Debrecen	33	14	6	13	49	48	+1	48	
6	Kecskemét	33	13	6	14	45	45	0	45	
7	Diósgyőr	33	12	9	12	50	56	−6	45	

Source: Hungarian Football Federation (in Hungarian), Soccerway
Rules for classification: 1) Points; 2) Matches won; 3) Goal difference; 4) Goals scored; 5) Head-to-head points; 6) Head-to-head goal difference; 7) Fair play ranking; 8) Drawing of lots.

==== Results summary ====
Overall								Home						Away					
Pld	W	D	L	GF	GA	GD	Pts	W	D	L	GF	GA	GD	W	D	L	GF	GA	GD
33	14	6	13	49	48	+1	48	11	1	5	29	16	+13	3	5	8	20	32	−12

Last updated: 18 May 2024.
Source: Soccerway

==== Results by round ====
Round	1	2	3	4	5	6	7	8	9	10	11	12	13	14	15	16	17	18	19	20	21	22	23	24	25	26	27	28	29	30	31	32	33
Ground	H	A	H	H	H	H	A	H	A	H	A	A	H	A	A	A	A	H	A	H	A	H	H	A	H	A	H	H	A	H	A	H	A
Result	W	L	W	W	L	W	L	L	D	W	D	L	W	W	D	L	D	D	W	L	L	W	L	D	W	W	L	W	L	W	L	W	L
Position	1	7	4	2	4	2	5	6	7	6	5	6	5	4	4	5	5	6	4	5	7	5	5	6	4	4	5	5	6	5	5	5	5

Updated to match(es) played on 10 February 2024. Source: Matches
A = Away; H = Home; W = Win; D = Draw; L = Loss

==== Matches ====
31 July 2023 1	Debrecen	3–1	Mezőkövesd	Debrecen
20:00 CEST (UTC+2)	Lončar 33', 54'; Lagator (yellow card) 64'; Do. Babunski 90+2'	Report	Lukić (yellow card) 23'; Dražić 27'; Brtan (yellow card) 29'	Stadium: Nagyerdei Stadion; Attendance: 4,844; Referee: Mihály Káprály

13 August 2023 3	Debrecen	1–0	Zalaegerszeg	Debrecen
16:30 CEST (UTC+2)	Kyziridis 83', (yellow card) 90+5'	Report	Milovanovikj (yellow card) 28'; Gergényi (yellow card) 88'; Ikoba (yellow card) 90+2'	Stadium: Nagyerdei Stadion; Attendance: 5,011; Referee: István Vad

21 August 2023 4	Debrecen	4–1	Kisvárda	Debrecen
20:15 CEST (UTC+2)	Kyziridis 7'; Mojžiš (yellow card) 45+2'; Dzsudzsák 77' (pen.); Lončar 84', (yellow card) 84'; Bódi 90+5'	Report	Vida 52'; Szőr (yellow card) 55'; Camaj (yellow card) 90+4'	Stadium: Nagyerdei Stadion; Attendance: 4,011; Referee: Dr Bence Csonka
Note: The match was originally scheduled to be held at Várkerti Stadion, Kisvárda, but due to a fungal infection of the turf, home side was reversed.

27 August 2023 5	Debrecen	1–3	MTK	Debrecen
15:30 CEST (UTC+2)	Bárány 7'; Domingues (yellow card) 88'	Report	Bobál 10', (yellow card) 66'; Bognár 13'; Hey (yellow card) 23'; Németh 63'; Kádár (yellow card) 85'	Stadium: Nagyerdei Stadion; Attendance: 4,144; Referee: Ferenc Karakó

3 September 2023 6	Debrecen	2–0	Kecskemét	Debrecen
19:30 CEST (UTC+2)	Lončar 62', (yellow card) 71'; Kusnyír 66'	Report	Leoni (yellow card) 10'; Szuhodovszki (yellow card) 83'	Stadium: Nagyerdei Stadion; Attendance: 4,521; Referee: Csaba Pintér

23 September 2023 7	Diósgyőr	3–1	Debrecen	Miskolc
17:00 CEST (UTC+2)	Holdampf 31'; Pernambuco 45+2'; Szatmári (yellow card) 49'; Gera (yellow card) 53'; Jurina (yellow card) 88'; Acolatse 90+2'	Report	Bárány 64'	Stadium: DVTK Stadion; Attendance: 9,518; Referee: Balázs Berke

27 September 2023 2	Paks	2–0	Debrecen	Paks
17:45 CEST (UTC+2)	Windecker 14'; Kinyik (yellow card) 52'; Könyves 61'; Papp (yellow card) 69'	Report	Lagator (yellow card) 59'; Bárány (yellow card) 68'; Szécsi (yellow card) 77'	Stadium: Fehérvári úti Stadion; Attendance: 1,890; Referee: Tamás Bognár
Note: The match was originally scheduled for 6 August 2023, but was postponed due to Debrecen's participation in European competition.

30 September 2023 8	Debrecen	1–2	Újpest	Debrecen
CEST (UTC+2)	Lagator (red card) 13'; Ferenczi (yellow card) 21'; Kyziridis (yellow card) 45+1'; Blagojević (not on pitch) (yellow card) 45+2'; Kusnyír 74'; Bódi (yellow card) 84'	Report	Mack (yellow card) 53'; Mörschel 80', 88'; Ganea (yellow card) 90+2'	Stadium: Nagyerdei Stadion; Attendance: 6,645; Referee: Gergő Bogár

8 October 2023 9	Ferencváros	2–2	Debrecen	Budapest
16:30 CEST (UTC+2)	Marquinhos 1'; S. Mmaee 18', (yellow card) 37'; Abu Fani (yellow card) 36'; Wingo (yellow card) 52'; Stanković (not on pitch) (yellow card) 62'; Pešić (yellow card) 86'; Lisztes (red card) 90+4'	Report	Ojediran (yellow card) 11'; Vajda 45'; Bárány (yellow card) 57'; Domingues 64'; Romanchuk (yellow card) 78'; Bévárdi (yellow card) 85'; Kusnyír (yellow card) 90+4'	Stadium: Groupama Arena; Attendance: 12,793; Referee: Ádám Farkas

22 October 2023 10	Debrecen	3–1	Fehérvár	Debrecen
15:30 CEST (UTC+2)	Bárány 6'; Domingues 33', 71'; Romanchuk (yellow card) 35'	Report	Szabó (yellow card) 15', (goal) 46'; Serafimov (yellow card) 56'; Karamoko (yellow card) 90'	Stadium: Nagyerdei Stadion; Attendance: 5,870; Referee: Balázs Berke

28 October 2023 11	Puskás Akadémia	1–1	Debrecen	Felcsút
17:00 CEST (UTC+2)	Gruber 37'; Szolnoki (yellow card) 74'	Report	Dzsudzsák 16'	Stadium: Pancho Aréna; Attendance: 1,721; Referee: Csaba Pintér

4 November 2023 12	Mezőkövesd	2–1	Debrecen	Mezőkövesd
12:30 CET (UTC+1)	Dražić (yellow card) 2'; Cseke 5'; Cseri 10'; Gomis (yellow card) 46'; Beriashvili (yellow card) 78'; Pillár (red card) 81'; Filip (yellow card) 87'	Report	Bárány 25'; Bódi (yellow card) 41'; Vajda (yellow card) 45'; Romanchuk (yellow card) 59'; Lagator (yellow card) 67'	Stadium: Városi Stadion; Attendance: 2,119; Referee: Dr Bence Csonka

12 November 2023 13	Debrecen	1–0	Paks	Debrecen
18:30 CET (UTC+1)	Ferenczi (yellow card) 30'; Vajda 37'; Kusnyír (yellow card) 40'; Lončar (yellow card) 53'; Lagator (yellow card) 56'; Megyeri (yellow card) 90+5'	Report	Lenzsér (yellow card) 43'	Stadium: Nagyerdei Stadion; Attendance: 4,144; Referee: Márton Rúsz

25 November 2023 14	Zalaegerszeg	1–2	Debrecen	Zalaegerszeg
17:00 CET (UTC+1)	Mance (yellow card) 26'; Croizet 38'; Evangelou (yellow card) 45'	Report	Bárány (yellow card) 34'; Vajda (yellow card) 44'; Dzsudzsák 56'; Várkonyi 68' (o.g.); Oliveira (yellow card) 90+4'	Stadium: ZTE Arena; Attendance: 1,914; Referee: Sándor Andó-Szabó

2 December 2023 15	Kisvárda	0–0	Debrecen	Kisvárda
19:30 CET (UTC+1)	Stefan (yellow card) 39'; Jovičić (yellow card) 70'	Report	Ferenczi (yellow card) 29'	Stadium: Várkerti Stadion; Attendance: 2,050; Referee: Csaba Pintér

9 December 2023 16	MTK	2–1	Debrecen	Budapest
13:15 CET (UTC+1)	Thiam 34'; Stieber 83'		Szécsi 50'; Lagator (yellow card) 57'; Manrique (yellow card) 76'	Stadium: Hidegkuti Nándor Stadion; Attendance: 2,021; Referee: Tamás Bognár

17 December 2023 17	Kecskemét	1–1	Debrecen	Kecskemét
13:30 CET (UTC+1)	Leoni (yellow card) 74'; Banó-Szabó 80'	Report	Szécsi 45+1', (yellow card) 74'; Mojžiš (yellow card) 74'	Stadium: Széktói Stadion; Attendance: 2,231; Referee: Péter Zierkelbach

3 February 2024 18	Debrecen	2–2	Diósgyőr	Debrecen
17:30 CET (UTC+1)	Dzsudzsák 62'; Romanchuk (yellow card) 70'; Úlfarsson (yellow card) 78'; Kusnyír 89'	Report	Bényei 50'; Jurek 57'; Szatmári (red card) 77'	Stadium: Nagyerdei Stadion; Attendance: 5,841; Referee: Gergő Bogár

6 February 2024 19	Újpest	1–2	Debrecen	Budapest
17:45 CET (UTC+1)	Jevtoski (red card) 59'; Mack (yellow card) 67'; Mörschel 90+11' (pen.)	Report	Lagator (yellow card) 67'; Domingues 78', 90+4'	Stadium: Szusza Ferenc Stadion; Attendance: 2,610; Referee: Csaba Pintér

10 February 2024 20	Debrecen	1–2	Ferencváros	Debrecen
17:30 CET (UTC+1)	Manrique 1'; Domingues (yellow card) 56'; Drešković (yellow card) 90+5'	Report	B. Varga 10'; Makreckis (yellow card) 36'; Zachariassen 74'	Stadium: Nagyerdei Stadion; Attendance: 12,114; Referee: Balázs Berke

18 February 2024 21	Fehérvár	1–0	Debrecen	Székesfehérvár
15:00 CET (UTC+1)				Stadium: Sóstói Stadion; Attendance: 4,770; Referee: S. Andó-Szabó

24 February 2024 22	Debrecen	1–0	Puskás Akadémia	Debrecen
17:30 CET (UTC+1)				Stadium: Nagyerdei Stadion; Attendance: 4,132; Referee: M. Káprály

2 March 2024 23	Debrecen	0–1	Mezőkövesd	Debrecen
12:30 CET (UTC+1)				Stadium: Nagyerdei Stadion; Attendance: 3,664; Referee: B. Csonka

10 March 2024 24	Paks	1–1	Debrecen	Paks
13:00 CET (UTC+1)	Dzsudzsák 3'; Dominguès (yellow card) 20'; Lagator (yellow card) 28'; B. Vajda (yellow card) 36'	Report	B. Tóth (yellow card) 11'; Osváth (yellow card) 44'; K. Papp 85'	Stadium: Fehérvári úti Stadion; Attendance: 2,489; Referee: T. Bognár

17 March 2024 25	Debrecen	5–1	Zalaegerszeg	Debrecen
12:30 CET (UTC+1)				Stadium: Nagyerdei Stadion; Attendance: 4,002; Referee: P. Antal

30 March 2024 26	Kisvárda	1–3	Debrecen	Kisvárda
14:30 CEST (UTC+2)				Stadium: Várkerti Stadion; Attendance: 2,580; Referee: Vad II.

6 April 2024 27	Debrecen	1–2	MTK	Debrecen
19:30 CEST (UTC+2)				Stadium: Nagyerdei Stadion

13 April 2024 28	Debrecen	1–0	Kecskemét	Debrecen
17:00 CEST (UTC+2)	Ojediran (yellow card) 53'; Dzsudzsák 69' (pen.); M. Szécsi (yellow card) 83'; D. Kocsis (yellow card) 89'	Report	K. Horváth (yellow card) 13'; Pálinkás (yellow card) 48'; L. Katona (yellow card) 62'; Belényesi (yellow card) 68'; Derekas (yellow card) 79'	Stadium: Nagyerdei Stadion; Attendance: 5,244; Referee: F. Karakó

20 April 2024 29	Diósgyőr	5–3	Debrecen	Miskolc
19:30 CEST (UTC+2)	Klimovich 1'; Edomwonyi 22', 60'; D. Gera 67'; Fekete 90+4'	Report	Ferenczi (yellow card) 29'; Baranyai 42'; Bárány 48'; Dzsudzsák (yellow card) 64'; Ojediran 83'	Stadium: DVTK Stadion; Attendance: 6,005; Referee: G. Bogár

27 April 2024 30	Debrecen	1–0	Újpest	Debrecen
19:30 CEST (UTC+2)	M. Szécsi (yellow card) 23'; Lagator (yellow card) 86'; Ojediran 88'	Report	Kobouri (yellow card) 43'; T. Kiss (red card) 48'	Stadium: Nagyerdei Stadion; Attendance: 6,592; Referee: B. Berke

5 May 2024 31	Ferencváros	5–1	Debrecen	Budapest
18:30 CEST (UTC+2)	Abena 49' 73'; Traoré 56'; B. Varga (yellow card) 58' (goal) 68' (pen.); Abu Fani 80'	Report	Lagator (yellow card) 58'; B. Vajda 64'; Tuboly (yellow card) 75'	Stadium: Groupama Arena; Attendance: 11,959; Referee: P. Antal

12 May 2024 32	Debrecen	1–0	Fehérvár	Debrecen
19:30 CEST (UTC+2)	Lagator (yellow card) 23'; J. Ferenczi (yellow card) 34'; B. Vajda (yellow card) 54'; Baranyai (yellow card) 73'; Dreskovics 79'; Bódi (yellow card) 90+3'; M. Szécsi (yellow card) 90+4'; Lončar (yellow card) 90+7'	Report	D. Sigér (yellow card) 65'	Stadium: Nagyerdei Stadion; Attendance: 5,347; Referee: T. Bognár

18 May 2024 33	Puskás Akadémia	4–1	Debrecen	Felcsút
17:45 CEST (UTC+2)	Zs. Nagy 15' (pen.), 36'; Plšek (yellow card) 47'; Komáromi 49', 90' (yellow card) 73'; Colley (yellow card) 90+5'	Report	Manrique (red card) 24'; Tuboly (yellow card) 34'; Bódi 45+4'	Stadium: Pancho Aréna; Attendance: 2,181; Referee: M. Rúsz

=== Magyar Kupa ===
The draw for the round of 64 was held on 28 August 2023.

16 September 2023 Round of 64	Eger	1–2	Debrecen	Eger
15:00 CEST (UTC+2)	Balázs 10'	Report	Domingues 36'; Ojediran (yellow card) 44'; Romanchuk 87'	Stadium: Szentmarjay Tibor Városi Stadion; Attendance: 700; Referee: Tamás Takács

31 October 2023 Round of 32	Győr	0–1	Debrecen	Győr
19:30 CET (UTC+1)	Vera (yellow card) 60'	Report	Lončar (yellow card) 31'; Ojediran (yellow card) 38'; Ferenczi (yellow card) 60'; Bévárdi (yellow card) 80'; Bárány 85'	Stadium: ETO Park; Attendance: 2,873; Referee: József Erdős

28 February 2024 Round of 16	Debrecen	1–1 (a.e.t.) (3–5 p)	Ferencváros	Debrecen
19:00 CET (UTC+1)	Bárány 81'	Report	Pešić 45+3' (pen.)	Stadium: Nagyerdei Stadion; Attendance: 10,371; Referee: Ferenc Karakó
	Penalties
	Bódi (penalty scored); Kocsis (penalty missed); Szuhodovszki (penalty scored); Ferenczi (penalty scored)		(penalty scored) Kodro; (penalty scored) Abu Fani; (penalty scored) Ramírez; (penalty scored) Marquinhos; (penalty scored) Zachariassen
Note: Ferencváros won on penalty kicks 5–3.

=== UEFA Europa Conference League ===
==== Second qualifying round ====
27 July 2023 First leg	Alashkert (Armenia)	0–1	(Hungary) Debrecen	Abovyan, Armenia
19:00 AMT (UTC+4)	Mužek (yellow card) 65'; Voskanyan (yellow card) 90+4'	Report	Lončar 50'	Stadium: Abovyan City Stadium (Note: The match was played at the Abovyan City Stadium in Abovyan, instead of their regular stadium, the Alashkert Stadium in Yerevan, which did not meet UEFA requirements.); Attendance: 2,870; Referee: Vassilis Fotias (Greece)

3 August 2023 Second leg	Debrecen (Hungary)	1–2 (a.e.t.) (2–2 agg.) (3–1 p)	(Armenia) Alashkert	Debrecen, Hungary
21:00 CEST (UTC+2)	Romanchuk (yellow card) 63'; Dzsudzsák 77'; Bárány (yellow card) 84'	Report	Ustinov 18'; Racines (yellow card) 24'; Carrillo (yellow card) 49'; Biai 67'; Kutalia (red card) 87'; Fatai (yellow card) 88'; Flores (yellow card) 90'; Gareginyan (yellow card) 111'; Voskanyan (yellow card) 120+4'	Stadium: Nagyerdei Stadion; Attendance: 10,708; Referee: Robert Schröder (Germany)
	Penalties
	Bódi (penalty scored); Mance (penalty scored); Bárány (penalty scored)		(penalty missed) Yedigaryan; (penalty missed) Biai; (penalty scored) Mužek; (penalty missed) Fatai
Note: Debrecen won on penalty kicks 3–1.

==== Third qualifying round ====
10 August 2023 First leg	Rapid Wien (Austria)	0–0	(Hungary) Debrecen	Vienna, Austria
21:00 CEST (UTC+2)	Querfeld (yellow card) 17'; Seidl (yellow card) 44'; Cvetković (yellow card) 75'; Kerschbaum (yellow card) 90+1'	Report	Oliveira (yellow card) 45+5'	Stadium: Allianz Stadion; Attendance: 17,200; Referee: Rob Hennessy (Republic of Ireland)

17 August 2023 Second leg	Debrecen (Hungary)	0–5 (0–5 agg.)	(Austria) Rapid Wien	Debrecen, Hungary
21:00 CEST (UTC+2)	Domingues (yellow card) 54'; Lagator (yellow card) 67'	Report	Seidl 15', (yellow card) 25'; Querfeld (yellow card) 30'; Auer (yellow card) 31'; Sattlberger (yellow card) 34'; Romanchuk 43' (o.g.); Cvetković (yellow card) 47'; Grüll 52'; Burgstaller 72'; Bajic 90'	Stadium: Nagyerdei Stadion; Attendance: 16,572; Referee: Aleksandar Stavrev (North Macedonia)
Note: Rapid Wien won 5–0 on aggregate.
