= 2021–22 Debreceni VSC season =

Debreceni VSC
2021–22 season
- Chairman: Gábor Szima
- Manager: Gábor Toldi
- Stadium: Nagyerdei Stadion
- NB 1: 7th
- Hungarian Cup: Round of 32
- Top goalscorer: League: Roland Ugrai (10); All: Roland Ugrai (10)
Home colours	Away colours	Third colours

The 2021–22 season will be Debreceni VSC's 43rd competitive season, 1st consecutive season in the OTP Bank Liga and 119th year in existence as a football club.

== Squad ==
As of 23 Sept, 2021.

Note: Flags indicate national team as defined under FIFA eligibility rules; some limited exceptions apply. Players may hold more than one non-FIFA nationality.

No.	Pos.	Nation	Player
4	DF	FRA	Sylvain Deslandes
5	DF	HUN	Bence Pávkovics
6	DF	SRB	Marko Nikolić
8	MF	MKD	David Babunski
10	FW	HUN	Roland Ugrai
11	DF	HUN	János Ferenczi
17	FW	HUN	Donát Bárány
18	MF	HUN	Attila Haris
19	MF	HUN	Balázs Dzsudzsák (captain)
20	MF	HUN	Ágoston Bényei
21	MF	HUN	Ádám Pintér
22	MF	HUN	Bence Sós
23	FW	HUN	Krisztián Németh
24	DF	HUN	Patrik Poór

No.	Pos.	Nation	Player
27	MF	HUN	Ádám Bódi
29	DF	HUN	Erik Kusnyír
30	FW	HUN	Patrik Tischler
31	DF	HUN	Zsombor Bévárdi
33	MF	HUN	József Varga
42	GK	HUN	Alex Hrabina
65	FW	HUN	Norbert Kundrák
69	DF	HUN	Mihály Korhut
70	MF	HUN	Dominik Soltész
77	MF	HUN	Péter Baráth
86	GK	SVK	Tomas Kosicky
88	FW	HUN	Márk Szécsi
96	DF	BRA	Charleston
99	GK	HUN	Dávid Gróf

== Transfers ==
=== Summer ===
In: Note: Flags indicate national team as defined under FIFA eligibility rules; some limited exceptions apply. Players may hold more than one non-FIFA nationality.

No.	Pos.	Nation	Player
4	DF	FRA	Sylvain Deslandes (from (Romania) Argeș Pitești)
6	DF	SRB	Marko Nikolić (from Budafok)
8	MF	MKD	David Babunski (from (Romania) Farul Constanța)
13	GK	HUN	Illés Zöldesi (from Kisvárda)
15	MF	HUN	Gergő Gyönyörű (from Debrecen II)
23	FW	HUN	Krisztián Németh (from (United States) Columbus Crew)
65	FW	HUN	Norbert Kundrák (loan return from Debreceni EAC)
70	MF	HUN	Dominik Soltész (loan from Budapest Honvéd II)
96	DF	BRA	Charleston (from (Moldova) Sfîntul Gheorghe)
99	GK	HUN	Dávid Gróf (from Ferencváros)
—	GK	HUN	Péter Kovács (loan return from Budaörs)
—	DF	HUN	Balázs Bényei (loan return from Debreceni EAC)
—	MF	HUN	Richárd Csősz (loan return from Kazincbarcika)
—	GK	HUN	István Szabados (loan return from Debreceni EAC)

Out: Note: Flags indicate national team as defined under FIFA eligibility rules; some limited exceptions apply. Players may hold more than one non-FIFA nationality.

No.	Pos.	Nation	Player
2	DF	HUN	Ákos Kinyik (to Paks)
3	DF	HUN	Csaba Szatmári (to Diósgyőr)
18	MF	HUN	Attila Haris (to Soroksár)
99	GK	HUN	Dávid Gróf (loan return to Ferencváros)
—	GK	HUN	István Szabados (to Ajka)
—	DF	HUN	Balázs Bényei (to Debreceni EAC)
—	GK	HUN	Péter Kovács (loan to Szolnok)
—	DF	HUN	Benjámin Lakatos (loan to Debreceni EAC)

=== Winter ===
In: Note: Flags indicate national team as defined under FIFA eligibility rules; some limited exceptions apply. Players may hold more than one non-FIFA nationality.

No.	Pos.	Nation	Player
23	FW	MKD	Dorian Babunski (from (Bulgaria) Botev Vratsa)
25	DF	HUN	Nimród Baranyai (from Debrecen U-19)

Out: Note: Flags indicate national team as defined under FIFA eligibility rules; some limited exceptions apply. Players may hold more than one non-FIFA nationality.

No.	Pos.	Nation	Player
13	GK	HUN	Illés Zöldesi (released)
23	FW	HUN	Krisztián Németh (released)

== Competitions ==
=== Overview ===
Competition	First match	Last match	Starting round	Final position	Record							
Competition	First match	Last match	Starting round	Final position	Pld	W	D	L	GF	GA	GD	Win %
Nemzeti Bajnokság I	31 July 2021	15 May 2022	Matchday 1	7th	33	10	9	14	45	52	−7	30.30
Hungarian Cup	18 September 2021	27 October 2021	Round of 64	Round of 32	2	1	0	1	2	2	+0	50.00
Total					35	11	9	15	47	54	−7	31.43

Last updated: 15 May 2022
Source: Competitions

=== Nemzeti Bajnokság I ===
==== League table ====
Pos	Team	Pld	W	D	L	GF	GA	GD	Pts
5	Újpest	33	12	8	13	50	48	+2	44
6	Paks	33	12	7	14	75	63	+12	43
7	Debrecen	33	10	9	14	45	52	−7	39
8	Zalaegerszeg	33	10	9	14	44	58	−14	39
9	Honvéd	33	10	8	15	48	51	−3	38

Source: Hungarian Football Federation (in Hungarian), Soccerway
Rules for classification: 1) Points; 2) Matches won; 3) Goal difference; 4) Goals scored; 5) Head-to-head points; 6) Head-to-head goal difference; 7) Head-to-head away goals scored; 8) Fair play ranking; 9) Drawing of lots.

==== Results summary ====
Overall								Home						Away					
Pld	W	D	L	GF	GA	GD	Pts	W	D	L	GF	GA	GD	W	D	L	GF	GA	GD
33	10	9	14	45	52	−7	39	5	6	5	24	23	+1	5	3	9	21	29	−8

Last updated: 15 May 2022.
Source: Soccerway

==== Results by round ====
Round	1	2	3	4	5	6	7	8	9	10	11	12	13	14	15	16	17	18	19	20	21	22	23	24	25	26	27	28	29	30	31	32	33
Ground	A	H	A	H	A	H	A	H	A	H	A	H	A	H	A	H	A	H	A	H	A	H	A	H	A	H	A	H	A	H	A	H	A
Result	W	D	D	L	L	W	L	D	L	L	D	W	L	D	L	W	D	D	W	L	W	W	L	L	W	D	L	W	L	L	W	D	L
Position	1	3	5	6	9	6	8	8	10	10	10	9	9	9	10	9	9	9	8	10	8	7	8	9	8	9	10	8	9	9	8	7	7

Updated to match(es) played on 15 May 2022. Source: Matches
A = Away; H = Home; W = Win; D = Draw; L = Loss

==== Matches ====
31 July 2021 1	Budapest Honvéd	1–4	Debrecen	Budapest
20:20 CEST	Bőle 37'	Report	Dzsudzsák 60' (pen.); Bárány 65'; Bévárdi 81'; Ugrai 90+5'	Stadium: Bozsik Stadion; Attendance: 3,257; Referee: Tamás Bognár

8 August 2021 2	Debrecen	2–2	Újpest	Debrecen
17:45 CEST	Tischler 77', 87'	Report	Croizet 6', 50'	Stadium: Nagyerdei Stadion; Attendance: 7,266; Referee: Gergő Bogár

14 August 2021 3	Paks	3–3	Debrecen	Paks
16:00 CEST	Ádám 45'; Hahn 50'; Bognár 63'	Report	Ferenczi 27'; Dzsudzsák 41'; Ugrai 73'	Stadium: Fehérvári úti Stadion; Attendance: 1,798; Referee: Péter Zierkelbach

21 August 2021 4	Debrecen	1–2	Zalaegerszeg	Debrecen
16:00 CEST	Korhut 65'	Report	Skribek 29'; Grezda 86'	Stadium: Nagyerdei Stadion; Attendance: 4,800; Referee: Ferenc Karakó

28 August 2021 5	Ferencváros	4–2	Debrecen	Budapest
18:15 CEST	Mak 39', 68'; R. Mmaee 56' (pen.); Laïdouni 73'	Report	Ugrai 18', 90'	Stadium: Groupama Arena; Attendance: 7,325; Referee: Gergő Bogár

10 September 2021 6	Debrecen	5–0	Gyirmót	Debrecen
20:00 CEST	Bévárdi 47'; Ugrai 51', 77'; Sós 64', 66'	Report		Stadium: Nagyerdei Stadion; Attendance: 3,089; Referee: Sándor Andó-Szabó

26 September 2021 7	Kisvárda	2–1	Debrecen	Kisvárda
14:15 CEST	Mešanović 50'; Zličić 90'	Report	Varga 11'	Stadium: Várkerti Stadion; Attendance: 2,980; Referee: Tamás Bognár

2 October 2021 8	Debrecen	1–1	Fehérvár	Debrecen
19:30 CEST	Ugrai 86'	Report	Kodro 90+2'	Stadium: Nagyerdei Stadion; Attendance: 4,054; Referee: István Vad

17 October 2021 9	Mezőkövesd	1–0	Debrecen	Mezőkövesd
17:00 CEST	Dražić 84'	Report		Stadium: Városi Stadion; Attendance: 2,019; Referee: Gergő Bogár

24 October 2021 10	Debrecen	0–3	Puskás Akadémia	Debrecen
13:30 CEST		Report	Puljić 22'; Kozák 28', 69'	Stadium: Nagyerdei Stadion; Attendance: 3,400; Referee: Csaba Pintér

30 October 2021 11	MTK Budapest	1–1	Debrecen	Budapest
17:00 CEST	Miovski 12'	Report	Ferenczi 65'	Stadium: Hidegkuti Nándor Stadion; Attendance: 2,231; Referee: Mihály Káprály

6 November 2021 12	Debrecen	5–3	Budapest Honvéd	Debrecen
17:00 CET	Dzsudzsák 36' (pen.), 59'; Ugrai 56'; Deslandes 67'; Németh 69'	Report	Lukić 25' (pen.); Bőle 29', 46'	Stadium: Nagyerdei Stadion; Attendance: 3,170; Referee: Ferenc Karakó

20 November 2021 13	Újpest	3–1	Debrecen	Budapest
17:00 CET	Beridze 20'; Koné 57'; Deslandes 87' (o.g.)	Report	Dzsudzsák 28' (pen.)	Stadium: Szusza Ferenc Stadion; Attendance: 1,667; Referee: József Erdős

28 November 2021 14	Debrecen	1–1	Paks	Debrecen
13:30 CET	Ugrai 20'	Report	Ádám 46'	Stadium: Nagyerdei Stadion; Attendance: 2,433; Referee: Tamás Bognár

4 December 2021 15	Zalaegerszeg	2–1	Debrecen	Zalaegerszeg
17:30 CET	Koszta 26'; Ubochioma 70'	Report	Dzsudzsák 66'	Stadium: ZTE Arena; Attendance: 712; Referee: Bence Csonka

12 December 2021 16	Debrecen	2–0	Ferencváros	Debrecen
16:30 CET	Bévárdi 46'; Tischler 64'	Report		Stadium: Nagyerdei Stadion; Attendance: 4,260; Referee: Gergő Bogár

19 December 2021 17	Gyirmót	0–0	Debrecen	Győr
16:30 CET		Report		Stadium: Ménfői úti Stadion; Attendance: 811; Referee: József Erdős

29 January 2022 18	Debrecen	0–0	Kisvárda	Debrecen
17:00 CET		Report		Stadium: Nagyerdei Stadion; Attendance: 2,570; Referee: Sándor Andó-Szabó

5 February 2022 19	Fehérvár	1–2	Debrecen	Székesfehérvár
19:30 CET	Alef 42'	Report	Szécsi 45', 87'	Stadium: MOL Aréna Sóstó; Attendance: 2,065; Referee: Gergő Bogár

12 February 2022 20	Debrecen	1–4	Mezőkövesd	Debrecen
17:00 CET	Dzsudzsák 45' (pen.)	Report	Jurina 20', 88'; Vadnai 64'; Beširović 68'	Stadium: Nagyerdei Stadion; Attendance: 2,850; Referee: Tamás Bognár

20 February 2022 21	Puskás Akadémia	0–2	Debrecen	Felcsút
15:30 CET		Report	Do. Babunski 17', 69'	Stadium: Pancho Aréna; Attendance: 1,225; Referee: Csaba Pintér

27 February 2022 22	Debrecen	1–0	MTK Budapest	Debrecen
17:00 CET	Pávkovics 26'	Report		Stadium: Nagyerdei Stadion; Attendance: 2,853; Referee: Balázs Berke

5 March 2022 23	Budapest Honvéd	4–2	Debrecen	Budapest
19:30 CET	D. Nagy 22'; Batik 43'; Petković 75'; Traoré 90'	Report	Ugrai 56'; Do. Babunski 58'	Stadium: Bozsik Stadion; Attendance: 2,624; Referee: István Vad

12 March 2022 24	Debrecen	1–2	Újpest	Debrecen
14:30 CET	Dzsudzsák 65' (pen.)	Report	Zivzivadze 5'; Antonov 48'	Stadium: Nagyerdei Stadion; Attendance: 6,011; Referee: Gergő Bogár

20 March 2022 25	Paks	0–1	Debrecen	Paks
13:15 CET		Report	Da. Babunski 52'	Stadium: Fehérvári úti Stadion; Attendance: 2,076; Referee: Sándor Andó-Szabó

2 April 2022 26	Debrecen	0–0	Zalaegerszeg	Debrecen
14:45 CEST		Report		Stadium: Nagyerdei Stadion; Attendance: 2,830; Referee: István Vad

9 April 2022 27	Ferencváros	3–0	Debrecen	Budapest
19:30 CEST	Nguen 8'; Marquinhos 39'; Zachariassen 73'	Report		Stadium: Groupama Arena; Attendance: 9,137; Referee: Balázs Berke

15 April 2022 28	Debrecen	3–1	Gyirmót	Debrecen
20:00 CEST	Baráth 3', 24'; Do. Babunski 86'	Report	Hasani 9'	Stadium: Nagyerdei Stadion; Attendance: 3,621; Referee: József Erdős

23 April 2022 29	Kisvárda	1–0	Debrecen	Kisvárda
14:00 CEST	Bumba 53' (pen.)	Report		Stadium: Várkerti Stadion; Attendance: 2,455; Referee: Péter Zierkelbach

30 April 2022 30	Debrecen	0–3	Fehérvár	Debrecen
19:30 CEST		Report	Nikolić 9'; Kodro 34'; Négo 79'	Stadium: Nagyerdei Stadion; Attendance: 3,604; Referee: István Vad

3 May 2022 31	Mezőkövesd	0–1	Debrecen	Mezőkövesd
16:30 CEST		Report	Pávkovics 45'	Stadium: Mezőkövesdi Városi Stadion; Attendance: 1,246; Referee: Tamás Bognár

7 May 2022 32	Debrecen	1–1	Puskás Akadémia	Debrecen
14:45 CEST	Bódi 34'	Report	Favorov 63'	Stadium: Nagyerdei Stadion; Attendance: 3,621; Referee: Balázs Berke

15 May 2022 33	MTK Budapest	3–0	Debrecen	Budapest
16:00 CEST	Rajković 47'; Futács 64' (pen.); Ramadani 90+2'	Report	Kusnyír (yellow card) 41' (yellow-red card) 89'	Stadium: Hidegkuti Nándor Stadion; Attendance: 4,422; Referee: Ferenc Karakó

=== Hungarian Cup ===
18 September 2021 Round of 64	Veszprém	0–1	Debrecen	Veszprém
15:00 CEST		Report	Nikolić 73'	Stadium: Városi Stadion; Referee: Ádám Németh

27 October 2021 Round of 32	Kecskemét	2–1 (a.e.t.)	Debrecen	Kecskemét
18:00 CEST	Szalai 90+3'; Tóth 115'	Report	Németh 83'	Stadium: Széktói Stadion; Attendance: 2,000; Referee: Gábor Oláh

== Statistics ==
=== Appearances and goals ===
Last updated on 15 May 2022.

No.	Pos	Nat	Player	Total		OTP Bank Liga		Hungarian Cup	
No.	Pos	Nat	Player	Apps	Goals	Apps	Goals	Apps	Goals
4	DF	(France) FRA	Sylvain Deslandes	31	1	29	1	2	0
5	DF	(Hungary) HUN	Bence Pávkovics	19	2	19	2	0	0
6	DF	(Serbia) SRB	Marko Nikolić	10	1	8	0	2	1
8	MF	(North Macedonia) MKD	David Babunski	26	1	24	1	2	0
10	FW	(Hungary) HUN	Roland Ugrai	27	10	25	10	2	0
11	DF	(Hungary) HUN	János Ferenczi	32	2	30	2	2	0
15	MF	(Hungary) HUN	Gergő Gyönyörű	5	0	4	0	1	0
17	FW	(Hungary) HUN	Donát Bárány	7	1	6	1	1	0
18	DF	(Hungary) HUN	Attila Szujó	2	0	2	0	0	0
19	MF	(Hungary) HUN	Balázs Dzsudzsák	32	8	31	8	1	0
20	MF	(Hungary) HUN	Ágoston Bényei	15	0	15	0	0	0
21	MF	(Hungary) HUN	Ádám Pintér	5	0	4	0	1	0
22	MF	(Hungary) HUN	Bence Sós	26	2	24	2	2	0
23	FW	(North Macedonia) MKD	Dorian Babunski	16	4	16	4	0	0
24	DF	(Hungary) HUN	Patrik Poór	8	0	8	0	0	0
25	DF	(Hungary) HUN	Nimród Baranyai	14	0	14	0	0	0
27	MF	(Hungary) HUN	Ádám Bódi	23	1	23	1	0	0
28	FW	(Hungary) HUN	Balázs Rácz	4	0	4	0	0	0
29	DF	(Hungary) HUN	Erik Kusnyír	15	0	14	0	1	0
30	FW	(Hungary) HUN	Patrik Tischler	23	3	22	3	1	0
31	DF	(Hungary) HUN	Zsombor Bévárdi	29	3	27	3	2	0
33	MF	(Hungary) HUN	József Varga	28	1	27	1	1	0
42	GK	(Hungary) HUN	Alex Hrabina	8	-12	8	-12	0	-0
65	FW	(Hungary) HUN	Norbert Kundrák	0	0	0	0	0	0
69	DF	(Hungary) HUN	Mihály Korhut	14	1	14	1	0	0
70	MF	(Hungary) HUN	Dominik Soltész	20	0	18	0	2	0
77	MF	(Hungary) HUN	Péter Baráth	34	2	32	2	2	0
86	GK	(Slovakia) SVK	Tomáš Košický	10	-15	10	-15	0	-0
88	FW	(Hungary) HUN	Márk Szécsi	11	2	11	2	0	0
96	DF	(Brazil) BRA	Charleston	9	0	9	0	0	0
99	GK	(Hungary) HUN	Dávid Gróf	19	-27	17	-25	2	-2
Youth players:
14	MF	(Hungary) HUN	Jan Maruscsák	0	0	0	0	0	0
14	MF	(Hungary) HUN	Botond Zauczky	0	0	0	0	0	0
16	DF	(Hungary) HUN	Szabolcs Sipos	0	0	0	0	0	0
Out to loan:
Players no longer at the club:
23	FW	(Hungary) HUN	Krisztián Németh	8	2	7	1	1	1

=== Top scorers ===
Includes all competitive matches. The list is sorted by shirt number when total goals are equal.

Last updated on 15 May 2022

Position	Nation	Number	Name	OTP Bank Liga	Hungarian Cup	Total
1	(Hungary)	10	Roland Ugrai	10	0	10
2	(Hungary)	19	Balázs Dzsudzsák	8	0	8
3	(North Macedonia)	23	Dorian Babunski	4	0	4
4	(Hungary)	30	Patrik Tischler	3	0	3
5	(Hungary)	31	Zsombor Bévárdi	3	0	3
6	(Hungary)	22	Bence Sós	2	0	2
7	(Hungary)	11	János Ferenczi	2	0	2
8	(Hungary)	88	Márk Szécsi	2	0	2
9	(Hungary)	77	Péter Baráth	2	0	2
10	(Hungary)	5	Bence Pávkovics	2	0	2
11	(Hungary)	23	Krisztián Németh	1	1	2
12	(Hungary)	17	Donát Bárány	1	0	1
13	(Hungary)	69	Mihály Korhut	1	0	1
14	(Hungary)	33	József Varga	1	0	1
15	(France)	4	Sylvain Deslandes	1	0	1
16	(North Macedonia)	8	David Babunski	1	0	1
17	(Hungary)	27	Ádám Bódi	1	0	1
18	(Serbia)	6	Marko Nikolić	0	1	1
/	/	/	Own Goals	0	0	0
			TOTALS	45	2	47

=== Disciplinary record ===
Includes all competitive matches. Players with 1 card or more included only.

Last updated on 15 May 2022

Position	Nation	Number	Name	OTP Bank Liga		Hungarian Cup		Total (Hu Total)	
Position	Nation	Number	Name	Yellow card	Red card	Yellow card	Red card	Yellow card	Red card
DF	(France)	4	Sylvain Deslandes	5	0	2	0	7 (5)	0 (0)
DF	(Hungary)	5	Bence Pávkovics	4	0	0	0	4 (4)	0 (0)
DF	(Serbia)	6	Marko Nikolić	1	1	2	0	3 (1)	1 (1)
MF	(North Macedonia)	8	David Babunski	3	0	1	0	4 (3)	0 (0)
FW	(Hungary)	10	Roland Ugrai	5	0	0	0	5 (5)	0 (0)
DF	(Hungary)	11	János Ferenczi	4	0	1	0	5 (4)	0 (0)
MF	(Hungary)	19	Balázs Dzsudzsák	4	1	0	0	4 (4)	1 (1)
MF	(Hungary)	22	Bence Sós	7	0	0	0	7 (7)	0 (0)
FW	(North Macedonia)	23	Dorian Babunski	2	0	0	0	2 (2)	0 (0)
FW	(Hungary)	23	Krisztián Németh	2	1	0	0	2 (2)	1 (1)
DF	(Hungary)	24	Patrik Poór	4	0	0	0	4 (4)	0 (0)
DF	(Hungary)	25	Nimród Baranyai	3	0	0	0	3 (3)	0 (0)
MF	(Hungary)	27	Ádám Bódi	3	0	0	0	3 (3)	0 (0)
DF	(Hungary)	29	Erik Kusnyír	4	1	0	0	4 (4)	1 (1)
FW	(Hungary)	30	Patrik Tischler	1	0	0	0	1 (1)	0 (0)
DF	(Hungary)	31	Zsombor Bévárdi	7	0	0	0	7 (7)	0 (0)
MF	(Hungary)	33	József Varga	4	0	0	0	4 (4)	0 (0)
DF	(Hungary)	69	Mihály Korhut	2	0	0	0	2 (2)	0 (0)
MF	(Hungary)	70	Dominik Soltész	1	0	1	0	2 (1)	0 (0)
MF	(Hungary)	77	Péter Baráth	4	0	0	0	4 (4)	0 (0)
DF	(Brazil)	96	Charleston	1	0	0	0	1 (1)	0 (0)
GK	(Hungary)	99	Dávid Gróf	3	0	0	0	3 (3)	0 (0)
			TOTALS	74	4	7	0	81 (74)	4 (4)

=== Clean sheets ===
Last updated on 15 May 2022

Position	Nation	Number	Name	OTP Bank Liga	Hungarian Cup	Total
1	(Hungary)	99	Dávid Gróf	5	1	6
2	(Hungary)	42	Alex Hrabina	3	0	3
3	(Slovakia)	86	Tomáš Košický	3	0	3
			TOTALS	11	1	12
