= Dušan Lagator =

Montenegrin footballer (born 1994)

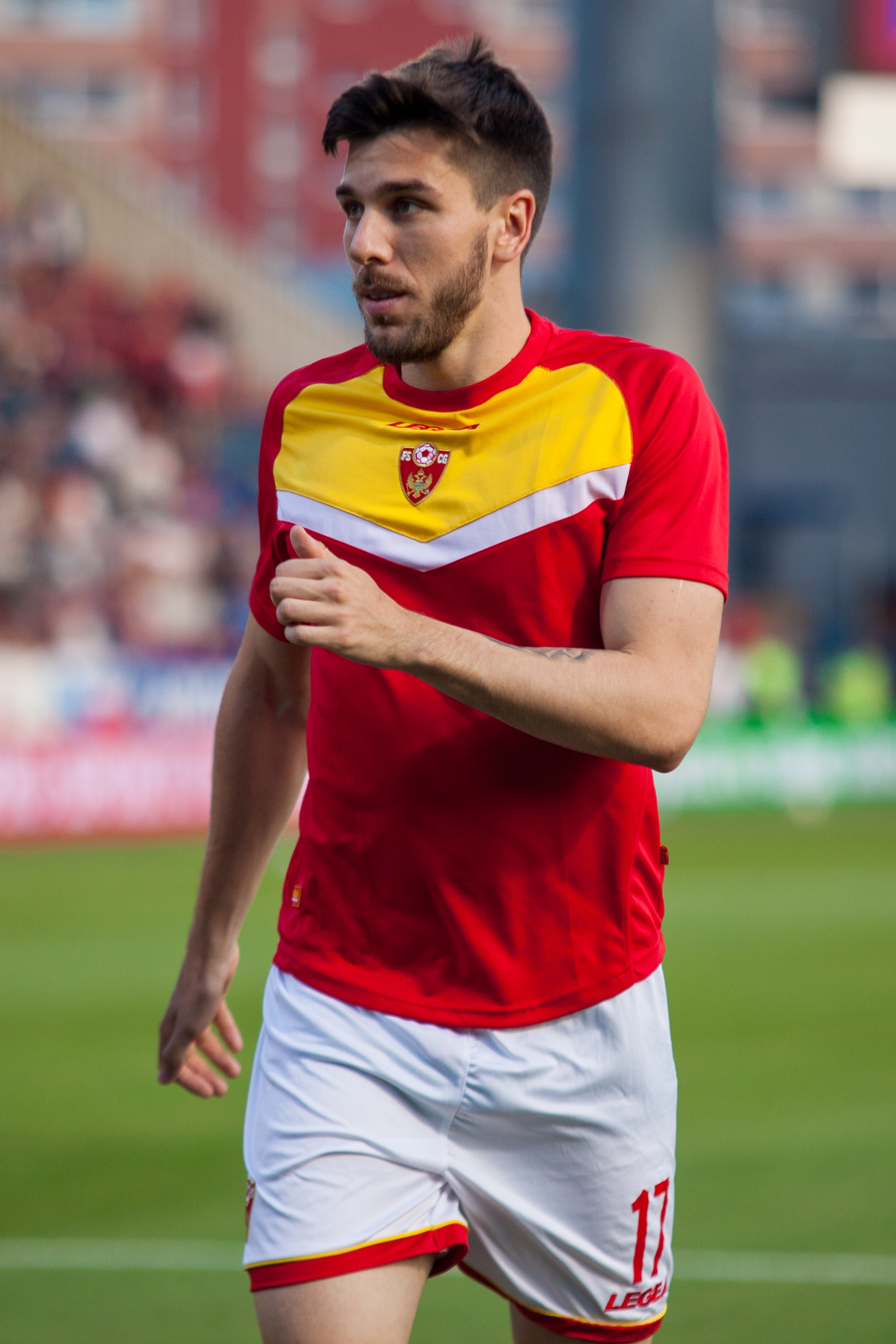
- Lagator with Montenegro in 2019

Personal information
- Date of birth: 29 March 1994 (age 32)
- Place of birth: Cetinje, FR Yugoslavia
- Height: 1.90 m (6 ft 3 in)
- Positions: Centre-back; defensive midfielder

Team information
- Current team: PSM Makassar
- Number: 94

Senior career*
| Years | Team | Apps | (Gls) |
| 2011–2013 | Mogren | 43 | (0) |
| 2014–2015 | Mladost Podgorica | 59 | (1) |
| 2016–2018 | Čukarički | 28 | (1) |
| 2018 | → Dynamo St. Petersburg (loan) | 11 | (0) |
| 2018–2020 | Sochi | 46 | (2) |
| 2020–2022 | Wisła Płock | 48 | (4) |
| 2022–2025 | Debrecen | 68 | (2) |
| 2025–2026 | Kerala Blasters | 7 | (1) |
| 2026– | PSM Makassar | 16 | (2) |

International career
| 2012 | Montenegro U19 | 1 | (0) |
| 2016 | Montenegro U21 | 5 | (1) |
| 2019–2021 | Montenegro | 9 | (0) |
- * Club domestic league appearances and goals as of 16 October 2026

Dušan Lagator (Serbian Cyrillic: Душан Лагатор; born 29 March 1994) is a Montenegrin professional footballer who plays as a centre-back or defensive midfielder for Super League club PSM Makassar.

== Club career ==
Lagator was born in Cetinje and began his career in Mogren. After 46 games across three years in Mogren, he moved to Mladost Podgorica. With Mladost, he won the Montenegrin Cup in the 2014–15 season. In the winter of 2016, he moved to Čukarički. He made his debut for Čukarički in the Serbian SuperLiga in a match against Metalac on 19 February 2016.

On 11 August 2020, Lagator signed with Polish club Wisła Płock.

In July 2022, he signed for Hungarian club Debrecen.

On 18 January 2025, Indian Super League club Kerala Blasters announced the signing of Lagator for an undisclosed transfer fee. He made his debut for the club on 19 January in a 0–0 draw against NorthEast United by coming as a substitute in the injury time. On 12 March 2025, Lagator scored his first goal for Kerala Blasters in a 1–1 draw against Hyderabad FC.

== International career ==
Lagator was part of Montenegro under-19 team in 2012.

In May 2016 he was part of Montenegro "B" team.

He made his senior debut for Montenegro on 5 September 2019 in a friendly against Hungary, as a 66th-minute substitute for Marko Simić.

== Career statistics ==
=== Club ===
As of match played 6 November 2025

Appearances and goals by club, season and competition
| Club | Season | League | | | National cup (Note: Includes Montenegrin Cup, Serbian Cup, Russian Cup, Polish Cup, Magyar Kupa, AIFF Super Cup) | | Continental | | Total | |
| Club | Season | Division | Apps | Goals | Apps | Goals | Apps | Goals | Apps | Goals |
|---|---|---|---|---|---|---|---|---|---|---|
| Mogren | 2011–12 | Montenegrin First League | 4 | 0 | 0 | 0 | — | | 4 | 0 |
| Mogren | 2012–13 | Montenegrin First League | 25 | 0 | 1 | 0 | — | | 26 | 0 |
| Mogren | 2013–14 | Montenegrin First League | 14 | 0 | 2 | 0 | — | | 16 | 0 |
| Mogren | Total | | 43 | 0 | 3 | 0 | 0 | 0 | 46 | 0 |
| Mladost | 2013–14 | Montenegrin First League | 14 | 0 | 3 | 0 | — | | 17 | 0 |
| Mladost | 2014–15 | Montenegrin First League | 30 | 0 | 4 | 0 | — | | 34 | 0 |
| Mladost | 2015–16 | Montenegrin First League | 15 | 1 | 3 | 0 | 2 (Note: Appearances in UEFA Europa League) | 1 | 20 | 2 |
| Mladost | Total | | 59 | 1 | 10 | 0 | 2 | 1 | 71 | 2 |
| Čukarički | 2015–16 | Serbian SuperLiga | 5 | 1 | 0 | 0 | — | | 5 | 1 |
| Čukarički | 2016–17 | Serbian SuperLiga | 20 | 0 | 3 | 0 | 3 | 0 | 26 | 0 |
| Čukarički | 2017–18 | Serbian SuperLiga | 3 | 0 | 0 | 0 | — | | 3 | 0 |
| Čukarički | Total | | 28 | 1 | 3 | 0 | 3 | 0 | 34 | 1 |
| Dynamo St. Petersburg (loan) | 2017–18 | RFNL | 11 | 0 | — | | — | | 11 | 0 |
| Sochi | 2018–19 | RFNL | 33 | 1 | 1 | 0 | — | | 34 | 1 |
| Sochi | 2019–20 | Russian Premier League | 13 | 1 | 1 | 0 | — | | 14 | 1 |
| Sochi | Total | | 46 | 2 | 2 | 0 | — | | 48 | 2 |
| Wisła Płock | 2020–21 | Ekstraklasa | 26 | 3 | 1 | 0 | — | | 27 | 3 |
| Wisła Płock | 2021–22 | Ekstraklasa | 22 | 1 | 1 | 0 | — | | 23 | 1 |
| Wisła Płock | Total | | 48 | 4 | 2 | 0 | — | | 50 | 4 |
| Debrecen | 2022–23 | Nemzeti Bajnokság I | 24 | 2 | 2 | 0 | — | | 26 | 2 |
| Debrecen | 2023–24 | Nemzeti Bajnokság I | 28 | 0 | 2 | 0 | 4 (Note: Appearances in UEFA Europa Conference League) | 0 | 34 | 0 |
| Debrecen | 2024–25 | Nemzeti Bajnokság I | 16 | 0 | 1 | 0 | — | | 17 | 0 |
| Debrecen | Total | | 68 | 2 | 5 | 0 | 4 | 0 | 77 | 2 |
| Kerala Blasters | 2024–25 | Indian Super League | 7 | 1 | 2 | 0 | — | | 9 | 1 |
| Kerala Blasters | 2025–26 | Indian Super League | — | | 2 | 0 | — | | 2 | 0 |
| Kerala Blasters | Total | | 7 | 1 | 4 | 0 | — | | 11 | 1 |
| Career total | | | 310 | 11 | 27 | 0 | 9 | 1 | 346 | 12 |

=== International ===
Appearances and goals by national team and year
| National team | Year | Apps | Goals |
|---|---|---|---|
Montenegro
| Montenegro | 2019 | 6 | 0 |
| Montenegro | 2021 | 3 | 0 |
| Total | | 9 | 0 |

== Honours ==
Mladost Podgorica

- Montenegro Cup: 2014–15
