= Donát Bárány =

Hungarian footballer (born 2000)

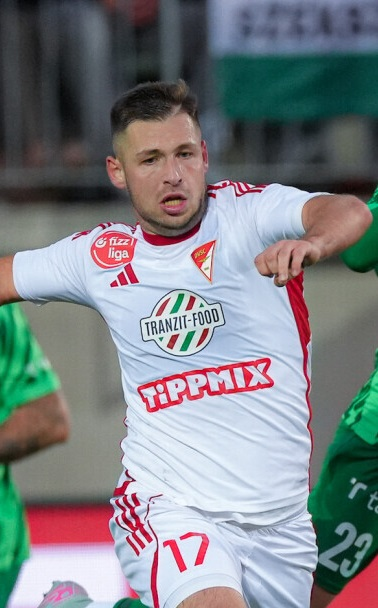
- Bárány playing for Debrecen in 2025

Personal information
- Date of birth: 4 September 2000 (age 26)
- Place of birth: Debrecen, Hungary
- Height: 1.79 m (5 ft 10 in)
- Position: Centre forward

Team information
- Current team: ADO Den Haag
- Number: 77

Youth career
- 2006–2012: Debreceni Honvéd
- 2010–2011: → Báránd (loan)
- 2011–2012: → Hajdúböszörmény (loan)
- 2012–2017: Debrecen

Senior career*
| Years | Team | Apps | (Gls) |
| 2017–2026 | Debrecen | 136 | (53) |
| 2017–2022 | → Debrecen II | 26 | (45) |
| 2019–2020 | → Debreceni EAC (loan) | 18 | (20) |
| 2026– | ADO Den Haag | 3 | (1) |

International career^{‡}
| 2020–2021 | Hungary U21 | 5 | (0) |
| 2026– | Hungary | 5 | (0) |
- * Club domestic league appearances and goals as of 11 October 2026 ‡ National team caps and goals as of 3 October 2026

Donát Bárány (born 4 April 2000) is a Hungarian professional footballer who plays for Eredivisie club ADO Den Haag and the Hungary national team.

== Club ==
In the 2018–2019 season, Bárány scored a total of 35 goals in 16 league matches for Debreceni VSC II, finishing third on the Hajdú-Bihar County First Division scoring leaderboard. Among his teammates, only Dániel Zsóri—who has already made his debut in Nemzeti Bajnokság I—scored more goals (39).

=== Debrecen ===
On 9 July 2019, he signed a professional contract with Nemzeti Bajnokság I club Debreceni VSC at the age of 18. However, he played in the first team in the Magyar Kupa before signing a professional contract.

In April 2026, he extended his contract with Debrecen until 2029.

=== Ado Den Haag ===
On 17 July 2026, he was signed by ADO Den Haag. On 12 September 2026, he debuted in a 2–0 defeat from FC Twente at the De Grolsch Veste. He entered the pitch as a substitute for Yannick Eduardo in the 67th minute. On 19 September 2026, he scored his first goal in the 2026–27 Eredivisie season in 1–1 draw against SC Cambuur at the ADO Den Haag Stadium. He equalized the result in the 74th minute.

== International ==
In 2020, he was invited to join the Hungary national under-21 football team by Zoltán Gera.

In 2021, he debuted in the Hungary U-21 in a friendly tie against Russia at the Sóstói Stadion, in Székesfehérvár. The match ended with a 2–0 victory for Hungary

On 28 March 2026, he debuted in the Hungary national football team in a friendly match against Slovenia. The match ended with a 1–0 victory for Hungary at the Puskás Aréna in Budapest.

== Career statistics ==
=== Club ===
As of match played 11 October 2026

Appearances and goals by club, season and competition
| Club | Season | League | | | Magyar Kupa | | Europe | | Total | |
| Club | Season | Division | Apps | Goals | Apps | Goals | Apps | Goals | Apps | Goals |
|---|---|---|---|---|---|---|---|---|---|---|
| Debrecen II | 2017–18 | Megyei Bajnokság I | 7 | 9 | — | | — | | 7 | 9 |
| Debrecen II | 2018–19 | Megyei Bajnokság I | 16 | 35 | — | | — | | 16 | 35 |
| Debrecen II | 2021–22 | Nemzeti Bajnokság III | 3 | 1 | — | | — | | 3 | 1 |
| Debrecen II | Total | | 26 | 45 | — | | — | | 26 | 45 |
| DEAC | 2019–20 | Nemzeti Bajnokság II | 18 | 20 | 2 | 1 | — | | 20 | 21 |
| Debrecen | 2017–18 | Nemzeti Bajnokság I | 0 | 0 | 1 | 2 | — | | 1 | 2 |
| Debrecen | 2018–19 | Nemzeti Bajnokság I | 0 | 0 | 2 | 0 | — | | 2 | 0 |
| Debrecen | 2020–21 | Nemzeti Bajnokság II | 30 | 15 | 3 | 1 | — | | 33 | 16 |
| Debrecen | 2021–22 | Nemzeti Bajnokság I | 6 | 1 | 1 | 0 | — | | 7 | 1 |
| Debrecen | 2022–23 | Nemzeti Bajnokság I | 17 | 4 | 0 | 0 | — | | 17 | 4 |
| Debrecen | 2023–24 | Nemzeti Bajnokság I | 30 | 8 | 1 | 2 | 4 (Note: Appearances in UEFA Europa Conference League) | 0 | 35 | 10 |
| Debrecen | 2024–25 | Nemzeti Bajnokság I | 28 | 13 | 2 | 3 | — | | 30 | 16 |
| Debrecen | 2025–26 | Nemzeti Bajnokság I | 25 | 12 | 2 | 1 | — | | 27 | 13 |
| Debrecen | Total | | 136 | 53 | 12 | 9 | 4 | 0 | 152 | 62 |
| ADO Den Haag | 2026–27 | Eredivisie | 3 | 1 | 0 | 0 | — | | 3 | 1 |
| ADO Den Haag | Total | | 3 | 1 | 0 | 0 | 0 | 0 | 3 | 1 |
| Career total | | | 183 | 119 | 14 | 10 | 4 | 0 | 201 | 129 |

=== International ===
As of match played on 2 October 2026

Appearances and goals by national team and year
| National team | Year | Apps | Goals |
|---|---|---|---|
| Hungary | 2026 | 5 | 0 |
| Total | | 5 | 0 |
