= Hamzat Ojediran =

Nigerian footballer (born 2003)

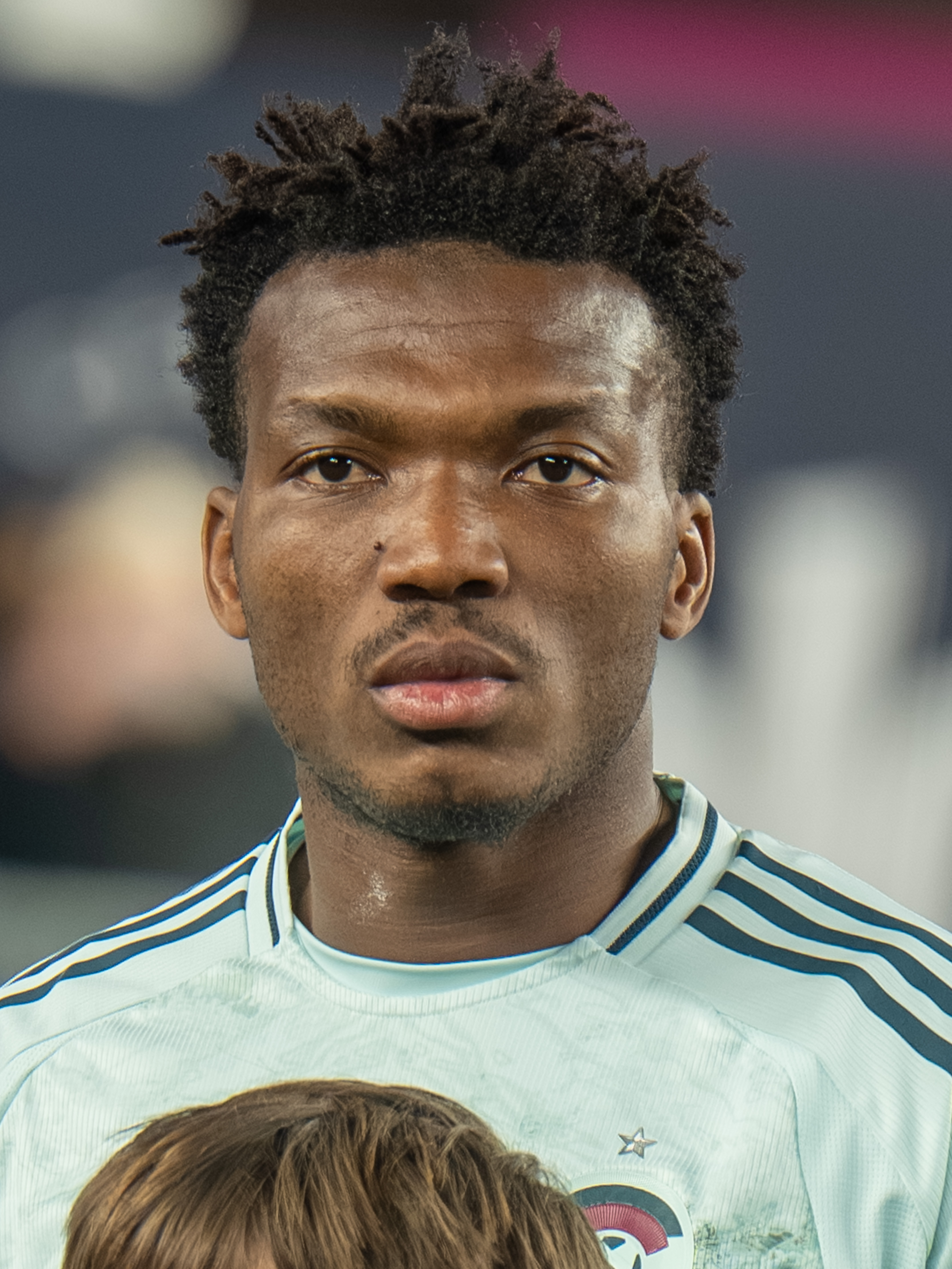
- Ojediran with the Colorado Rapids in 2026

Personal information
- Full name: Hamzat-Basit Ojediran
- Date of birth: 14 November 2003 (age 22)
- Place of birth: Lagos, Nigeria
- Height: 1.72 m (5 ft 8 in)
- Position: Midfielder

Team information
- Current team: Colorado Rapids
- Number: 8

Youth career
- E & A Academy

Senior career*
Years	Team	Apps	(Gls)
2022–2023	KF Egnatia	11	(0)
2023	→ Debreceni VSC (loan)	7	(0)
2023–2024	Debreceni VSC	25	(3)
2024–2026	Lens	17	(1)
2024–2025	Lens B	5	(1)
2026–	Colorado Rapids	0	(0)

International career
2019	Nigeria U17	4	(0)
- * Club domestic league appearances and goals as of 25 May 2025

Hamzat-Basit Ojediran (born 14 November 2003) is a Nigerian professional footballer who plays as a midfielder for Major League Soccer club Colorado Rapids.

== Club career ==
A youth product of the Emmanuel Amunike Academy, Ojediran signed his first professional contract with the Albanian club KF Egnatia on 24 August 2022 for 4 years. On 14 February 2023, he joined the Hungarian club Debreceni VSC on loan with an option to buy. On 30 June 2023 DVSC trigged his buyclause, and became a starter in the Nemzeti Bajnokság I. On 8 August 2024, he transferred to the French Ligue 1 club RC Lens on a contract until 2028.

On 8 January 2026, Ojediran joined Major League Soccer side Colorado Rapids on a deal until the end of the 2028–29 season.

== International career ==
Ojediran played for the Nigeria U17s at the 2019 FIFA U-17 World Cup.

== Career statistics ==
As of match played 4 May 2025

Appearances and goals by club, season and competition
Club	Season	League			Cup		Europe		Other		Total	
Club	Season	Division	Apps	Goals	Apps	Goals	Apps	Goals	Apps	Goals	Apps	Goals
KF Egnatia	2022–23	Kategoria Superiore	11	0	1	0	—		—		12	0
Debrecen (loan)	2022–23	Nemzeti Bajnokság I	7	0	0	0	—		—		7	0
Debrecen	2023–24	Nemzeti Bajnokság I	24	3	0	0	0	0	—		24	3
Debrecen	2024–25	Nemzeti Bajnokság I	1	0	0	0	0	0	—		1	0
Debrecen	Total		25	3	0	0	0	0	—		25	3
Lens	2024–25	Ligue 1	17	1	0	0	0	0	—		17	1
Career total			59	4	1	0	0	0	0	0	60	4
