= Stefan Lončar =

Montenegrin footballer

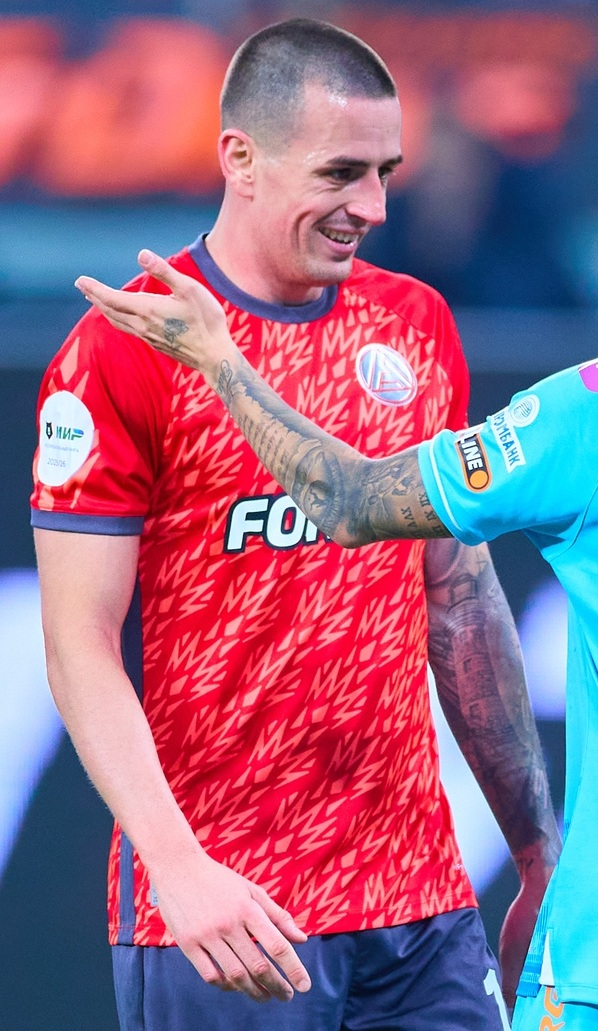
- Lončar with Akron Tolyatti in 2025

Personal information
- Date of birth: 19 February 1996 (age 30)
- Place of birth: Nikšić, FR Yugoslavia
- Height: 1.90 m (6 ft 3 in)
- Position: Defensive midfielder

Team information
- Current team: Akron Tolyatti
- Number: 15

Youth career
- Sutjeska

Senior career*
Years	Team	Apps	(Gls)
2014–2016	Sutjeska	43	(2)
2016	Rad	0	(0)
2017–2018	Sutjeska	60	(8)
2019–2021	Alavés	0	(0)
2019–2021	→ Istra 1961 (loan)	71	(1)
2021–2023	Novi Pazar	52	(3)
2023–2024	Debrecen	48	(5)
2024–	Akron Tolyatti	71	(12)

International career^{‡}
2018–	Montenegro	32	(0)
- * Club domestic league appearances and goals as of 21 November 2026 ‡ National team caps and goals as of 15 November 2026

Stefan Lončar (born 19 February 1996) is a Montenegrin professional footballer who plays as a defensive midfielder for Russian club Akron Tolyatti and the Montenegro national team.

== Club career ==
=== Sutjeska ===
Lončar made his professional debut with hometown team Sutjeska. In September 2016, he joined Serbian team FK Rad on the last day of the summer transfer window. After six months at Rad, Lončar didn't play a game and returned to Sutjeska. After two more seasons at Sutjeska, he was recognized as the best player of the Montenegrin First League in 2018.

=== Alavés ===
==== Loan to Istra 1961 ====
On 20 January 2019, it was announced that Lončar signed a contract with Spanish club Alavés, lasting until the summer of 2021. Upon signing, he was immediately sent on a one-season loan to Croatian club Istra 1961, whose ownership was bought by Alavés in the summer of 2018. On 29 September 2019, he scored his first goal for Istra in a 1–1 tie with Hajduk Split.

=== Debrecen ===
On 10 January 2023, Lončar moved to Debrecen in Hungary. On 31 July 2023, he scored two goals against Mezőkövesdi SE on the first match day of the 2023–24 Nemzeti Bajnokság I season. The final result was a 3–1 victory for Debrecen.

=== Akron Tolyatti ===
On 24 June 2024, Lončar signed a contract with the Russian Premier League newcomers Akron Tolyatti. On 15 July 2026, his contract with Akron was extended to 2028.

== International career ==
On 28 May 2018, Lončar made his international debut for Montenegro in an exhibition match Bosnia and Herzegovina which ended in a 0–0 tie.

== Career statistics ==
As of match played 21 November 2026

Appearances and goals by club, season and competition
Club	Season	League			National Cup (Note: Includes Montenegrin Cup, Croatian Football Cup, Magyar Kupa, Russian Cup)		Other		Total	
Club	Season	Division	Apps	Goals	Apps	Goals	Apps	Goals	Apps	Goals
Sutjeska	2014–15	Montenegrin First League	17	1	3	0	0	0	20	1
Sutjeska	2015–16	Montenegrin First League	26	1	0	0	0	0	26	1
Sutjeska	2016–17	Montenegrin First League	11	0	3	0	—		14	0
Sutjeska	2017–18	Montenegrin First League	31	4	2	0	2 (Note: Appearances in UEFA Europa League)	0	35	4
Sutjeska	2018–19	Montenegrin First League	18	4	2	1	1	0	21	5
Sutjeska	Total		103	10	10	1	3	0	116	11
Istra 1961 (loan)	2018–19	Prva HNL	14	0	0	0	2 (Note: Appearances in relegation play-offs)	0	16	0
Istra 1961 (loan)	2019–20	Prva HNL	32	1	2	0	2	0	36	1
Istra 1961 (loan)	2020–21	Prva HNL	25	0	2	0	—		27	0
Istra 1961 (loan)	Total		71	1	4	0	4	0	79	1
Novi Pazar	2021–22	Serbian SuperLiga	34	2	3	0	2	0	39	2
Novi Pazar	2022–23	Serbian SuperLiga	18	1	2	0	—		20	1
Novi Pazar	Total		52	3	5	0	2	0	59	3
Debrecen	2022–23	Nemzeti Bajnokság I	17	1	2	1	—		19	2
Debrecen	2023–24	Nemzeti Bajnokság I	31	4	1	0	—		32	4
Debrecen	Total		48	5	3	1	0	0	51	6
Akron Togliatti	2024–25	Russian Premier League	29	6	2	0	—		31	6
Akron Togliatti	2025–26	Russian Premier League	28	4	6	0	2	0	36	4
Akron Togliatti	2026–27	Russian Premier League	14	2	3	0	—		17	2
Akron Togliatti	Total		71	12	11	0	2	0	84	12
Career total			345	31	33	2	11	0	389	33

=== International ===
As of matches played on 15 November 2026

Appearances and goals by national team and year
National team	Year	Apps	Goals
Montenegro	2018	2	0
Montenegro	2022	2	0
Montenegro	2023	8	0
Montenegro	2024	3	0
Montenegro	2025	8	0
2026	9	0	
Total		32	0

== Honours ==
Individual

- Nemzeti Bajnokság I Goal of the Month: September 2023
