= Antonio Mance =

Croatian footballer

Personal information
- Date of birth: 7 August 1995 (age 31)
- Place of birth: Rijeka, Croatia
- Height: 1.88 m (6 ft 2 in)
- Position: Forward

Team information
- Current team: Lion City Sailors
- Number: 12

Youth career
- 2004–2006: Orijent
- 2006–2011: Rijeka
- 2011–2013: Pomorac Kostrena
- 2013–2014: Istra 1961

Senior career*
Years	Team	Apps	(Gls)
2012–2015	Istra 1961	5	(0)
2012–2013	→ Pomorac Kostrena (loan)	2	(0)
2015–2017	Domžale	41	(13)
2017–2019	Trenčín	52	(21)
2019	→ Nantes (loan)	5	(0)
2019–2023	Osijek	55	(11)
2020–2021	→ Puskás Akadémia (loan)	26	(7)
2021–2022	→ Erzgebirge Aue (loan)	8	(0)
2023	Debrecen	17	(2)
2023–2024	Zalaegerszeg	27	(15)
2024–2026	Umm Salal	38	(16)
2026–	Lion City Sailors	5	(4)

International career
2014	Croatia U19	3	(1)
2015	Croatia U20	2	(0)
- * Club domestic league appearances and goals as of 1 November 2026

Antonio Mance (born 7 August 1995) is a Croatian professional footballer who plays as a forward for Singapore Premier League club Lion City Sailors.

== Club career ==
Mance is a product of youth system of Pomorac Kostrena. Then, he joined Istra 1961. He made his top division debut on 13 April 2014 against Hrvatski Dragovoljac.

On 31 January 2019, Mance moved to Nantes on a loan, to replace the late Emiliano Sala, who died in a plane crash.

After Mance's loan at Nantes finished, on 21 June 2019, he returned to Croatia and signed a four-year contract with Osijek. The transfer fee was reported as €1 million.

He joined 2. Bundesliga club Erzgebirge Aue on a season-long loan from Osijek in August 2021. The loan was cut short in January 2022. He made eight appearances without scoring a goal.

In January 2023, Mance joined Hungarian club Debrecen on an eighteen-month contract.

== International career ==
Mance played for Croatia U19 and Croatia U20.

== Career statistics ==
=== Club ===
As of match played 13 December 2024

Club	Season	League			National cup (Note: Includes Slovenian Football Cup, Slovak Cup, Coupe de France, Croatian Football Cup, Magyar Kupa, Qatari Stars Cup)		Continental		Total	
Club	Season	Division	Apps	Goals	Apps	Goals	Apps	Goals	Apps	Goals
Pomorac	2012–13	Druga HNL	2	0	—		—		2	0
Istra 1961	2013–14	Prva HNL	5	0	0	0	—		5	0
Istra 1961	2014–15	Prva HNL	—		—		—		0	0
Istra 1961	Total		5	0	0	0	—		5	0
Domžale	2015–16	Slovenian PrvaLiga	31	11	5	0	—		36	11
Domžale	2016–17	Slovenian PrvaLiga	10	2	1	0	5 (Note: Appearances in UEFA Europa League)	0	16	2
Domžale	Total		41	13	6	0	5	0	52	13
Trenčín	2016–17	Slovak First Football League	10	4	1	0	—		11	4
Trenčín	2017–18	Slovak First Football League	24	10	2	0	4	2	30	12
Trenčín	2018–19	Slovak First Football League	18	7	2	4	8	6	28	17
Trenčín	Total		52	21	5	4	12	8	69	33
Nantes	2018–19	Ligue 1	5	0	1	1	—		6	1
Osijek	2019–20	Prva HNL	30	7	3	4	2	0	35	11
Osijek	2021–22	Prva HNL	17	4	1	1	3 (Note: Appearance(s) in UEFA Europa Conference League)	0	21	5
Osijek	2022–23	Prva HNL	8	0	1	0	1	0	10	0
Osijek	Total		55	11	5	5	6	0	66	16
Puskás Akadémia (loan)	2020–21	Nemzeti Bajnokság I	26	7	4	3	0	0	30	10
Erzgebirge Aue	2021–22	2. Bundesliga	8	0	—		—		8	0
Debrecen	2022–23	Nemzeti Bajnokság I	15	2	2	1	—		17	3
Debrecen	2023–24	Nemzeti Bajnokság I	2	0	0	0	2	0	4	0
Debrecen	Total		17	2	2	1	2	0	21	3
Zalaegerszeg	2023–24	Nemzeti Bajnokság I	27	15	1	1	—		28	16
Umm Salal	2024–25	Qatar Stars League	11	7	2	0	—		13	7
Career total			249	76	26	15	25	8	300	99

== Personal life ==
An younger brother of Armando Mance, Armando also works as Antonio's agent.

== Honours ==
NK Domžale

- Slovenian Football Cup: 2016–17

Individual

- Nemzeti Bajnokság I Player of the Month: October 2023
