= Karim Loukili =

Moroccan footballer (born 1997)

Personal information
- Date of birth: 28 April 1997 (age 29)
- Place of birth: The Hague, Netherlands
- Height: 1.75 m (5 ft 9 in)
- Position: Midfielder

Team information
- Current team: Egnatia Rrogozhinë
- Number: 20

Youth career
- 2004–2005: HMSH
- 2005–2013: ADO Den Haag
- 2013–2015: Utrecht

Senior career*
Years	Team	Apps	(Gls)
2016–2018	Jong Utrecht	34	(3)
2018	Chabab Rif Al Hoceima	4	(1)
2019–2020	Jong Sparta	15	(5)
2020	1. FC Phönix Lübeck	2	(2)
2020–2021	Helmond Sport	37	(9)
2021–2022	Riga	24	(2)
2022–2023	Debreceni	0	(0)
2023–2024	Karmiotissa	25	(2)
2024–2025	TOP Oss	33	(0)
2025–2026	AF Elbasani	44	(4)
2026–	Egnatia Rrogozhinë	0	(0)

International career
- Netherlands U18
- Morocco U20
- * Club domestic league appearances and goals as of 24 June 2026

Karim Loukili (born 28 April 1997) is a professional footballer who plays as a midfielder for Albanian club Egnatia Rrogozhinë. Born in the Netherlands, he represented Morocco at under-20 international level.

== Club career ==
He made his professional debut in the Eerste Divisie for Jong FC Utrecht on 19 December 2016 in a game against SC Telstar.

Loukili joined CR Al Hoceima in August 2018 and played for the club until the end of the year, before he was released. After having been a free agent for six months, he joined the reserve team of Sparta Rotterdam, Jong Sparta, in the summer of 2019. In January 2020, Loukili moved to German fifth-tier club 1. FC Phönix Lübeck, playing in the Oberliga Schleswig-Holstein.

After six months, on 1 August 2020, Loukili joined Helmond Sport after a successful trial on a one-year deal with a one-year option.

On 17 July 2021, he moved to Riga FC in Latvia. On 27 July 2022, Loukili had his contract terminated by mutual consent.

On 1 February 2024, Loukili signed with TOP Oss until the summer of 2025.
