= Christian Manrique =

Spanish footballer

Personal information
- Full name: Christian Manrique Díaz
- Date of birth: 2 October 1998 (age 28)
- Place of birth: Móstoles, Spain
- Height: 1.80 m (5 ft 11 in)
- Position: Left back

Team information
- Current team: Panetolikos
- Number: 15

Youth career
- Rayo Vallecano

Senior career*
Years	Team	Apps	(Gls)
2017–2018	Rayo Vallecano B	29	(1)
2018–2020	Omonia	19	(0)
2020–2022	Olympiakos Nicosia	57	(2)
2022–2024	Debrecen	43	(3)
2024–2025	Alcorcón	18	(0)
2025–	Panetolikos	32	(0)

International career
2016	Spain U19	2	(0)
- * Club domestic league appearances and goals as of 20 September 2026

Christian Manrique Díaz (born 2 October 1998) is a Spanish professional footballer who plays for Greek Super League club Panetolikos, as a left back.

== Club career ==
Born in Móstoles, Manrique graduated from the youth academy of Rayo Vallecano and was promoted to the B-team on 15 June 2017. On 28 August, he made his debut, coming on as a substitute for Victor Villacañas in a 2−1 defeat against CF Trival Valderas. On 17 December, he scored his first goal for the team in a 3−0 victory against CD San Fernando de Henares.

On 11 July 2018, Manrique moved abroad and joined Cypriot First Division club AC Omonia. On 16 September, he made his debut for the club, coming on as a last minute substitute for Jaílson in a 1−0 win against Enosis Neon Paralimni FC.

On 1 June 2022, Manrique signed a contract with Debrecen in Hungary for two years with an option for a third.

On 6 August 2024, Manrique returned to Spain and signed with Alcorcón in the third tier.

== International career ==
Manrique has been capped by Spain at under-19 level.

== Career statistics ==
=== Club ===
As of match played on 14 June 2026

Club	Season	League			National Cup		Continental		Other		Total	
Club	Season	Division	Apps	Goals	Apps	Goals	Apps	Goals	Apps	Goals	Apps	Goals
Rayo Vallecano B	2017–18	Tercera División	29	1	—		—		—		29	1
Omonia	2018–19	Cypriot First Division	19	0	1	0	—		—		20	0
Omonia	2019–20	Cypriot First Division	0	0	2	0	—		—		2	0
Omonia	Total		19	0	3	0	—		—		22	0
Olympiakos Nicosia	2020–21	Cypriot First Division	31	1	4	0	—		—		35	1
Olympiakos Nicosia	2021–22	Cypriot First Division	26	1	2	0	—		—		28	1
Olympiakos Nicosia	Total		57	2	6	0	—		—		63	2
Debrecen	2022–23	NB I	20	1	4	0	—		—		24	1
Debrecen	2023–24	NB I	23	2	2	0	4	0	—		29	2
Debrecen	Total		43	3	6	0	4	0	—		53	3
Alcorcón	2024–25	Primera Federación	18	0	0	0	—		—		18	0
Panetolikos	2025–26	Super League Greece	29	0	4	0	—		—		33	0
Career total			195	6	19	0	4	0	0	0	218	6
