= Georgios Neofytidis =

Greek footballer

Personal information
- Date of birth: 28 July 2000 (age 26)
- Place of birth: Thessaloniki, Greece
- Height: 1.83 m (6 ft 0 in)
- Position: Defensive midfielder

Team information
- Current team: PAEEK Kyrenia
- Number: 28

Youth career
- –2014: Aris
- 2014–2020: Olympiacos

Senior career*
Years	Team	Apps	(Gls)
2020−2022	Zemplín Michalovce	43	(0)
2022	Zlaté Moravce	9	(0)
2022−2023	Debrecen	10	(1)
2024	Iraklis	13	(0)
2024	Mioveni	9	(0)
2025	Ilioupoli	17	(0)
2026−	PAEEK Kyrenia	14	(1)

International career
2016	Greece U16	4	(0)
2015–2017	Greece U17	9	(0)
2018–2019	Greece U19	7	(0)
- * Club domestic league appearances and goals as of 3 May 2026

Georgios Neofytidis (Greek: Γεώργιος Νεοφυτίδης; born 28 July 2000) is a Greek professional footballer who plays as a defensive midfielder for Cypriot Second Division League club PAEEK Kyrenia.

== Career ==
=== Zemplín Michalovce ===
On 15 February 2020, Neofytidis made his Fortuna Liga debut for Zemplín Michalovce against AS Trenčín.
