= Ádám Bódi =

Hungarian footballer

Personal information
- Date of birth: 18 October 1990 (age 36)
- Place of birth: Nyíregyháza, Hungary
- Height: 1.82 m (5 ft 11 1/2 in)
- Position: Right midfielder

Team information
- Current team: Tiszakécske
- Number: 27

Youth career
- 2001–2008: Debrecen

Senior career*
Years	Team	Apps	(Gls)
2008–2016	Debrecen	153	(29)
2008–2014	→ Debrecen II	53	(11)
2016–2018	Videoton	11	(0)
2017–2018	→ Debrecen (loan)	23	(4)
2018–2024	Debrecen	153	(27)
2024–2025	Kazincbarcika	29	(9)
2025–	Tiszakécske	26	(4)

International career
2010–2013	Hungary U21	16	(0)
2015	Hungary	1	(0)
- * Club domestic league appearances and goals as of 31 May 2026

Ádám Bódi (Hungarian pronunciation: [ˈaːdaːm ˈboːdi]; born 18 October 1990) is a Hungarian professional footballer who plays for Nemzeti Bajnokság II club Tiszakécske FC.

== Club career ==
=== Debrecen ===
Bódi won the 2009–10 season of the Hungarian League with Debrecen despite his team lost to Kecskeméti TE in the last round. In 2010 Debrecen beat Zalaegerszegi TE in the Hungarian Cup final in the Puskás Ferenc Stadium by 3–2.

On 1 May 2012 Bódi won the Hungarian Cup with Debrecen by beating MTK Budapest on penalty shoot-out in the 2011–12 season. This was the fifth Hungarian Cup trophy for Debrecen.

On 12 May 2012 Bódi won the Hungarian League title with Debrecen after beating Pécs in the 28th round of the Hungarian League by 4–0 at the Oláh Gábor út Stadium which resulted the sixth Hungarian League title for the Hajdús.

On 9 July 2025 Bódi signed a two-year contract with Nemzeti Bajnokság II club Tiszakécske FC.

== Club statistics ==
Appearances and goals by club, season and competition
Club	Season	League		Cup		League Cup		Europe		Total	
Club	Season	Apps	Goals	Apps	Goals	Apps	Goals	Apps	Goals	Apps	Goals
Debrecen II	2008–09	23	6	3	1	–	–	–	–	26	7
Debrecen II	2009–10	21	4	2	0	–	–	–	–	23	4
Debrecen II	2010–11	7	1	0	0	–	–	–	–	7	1
Debrecen II	2011–12	1	0	–	–	–	–	–	–	1	0
Debrecen II	2013–14	1	0	–	–	–	–	–	–	1	0
Debrecen II	Total	53	11	5	1	–	–	–	–	58	12
Debrecen	2008–09	0	0	0	0	2	0	0	0	2	0
Debrecen	2009–10	1	0	4	0	5	1	0	0	10	1
Debrecen	2010–11	20	5	2	0	6	0	7	0	35	5
Debrecen	2011–12	29	8	4	2	0	0	0	0	33	10
Debrecen	2012–13	26	4	5	1	2	0	6	0	39	5
Debrecen	2013–14	24	4	5	2	4	2	1	0	34	8
Debrecen	2014–15	26	6	1	0	7	1	6	0	40	7
Debrecen	2015–16	27	2	5	0	–	–	6	2	38	4
Debrecen	2017–18	23	4	4	0	–	–	–	–	27	4
Debrecen	2018–19	31	7	6	1	–	–	–	–	37	8
Debrecen	2019–20	17	3	0	0	–	–	0	0	17	3
Debrecen	2020–21	36	11	3	0	–	–	–	–	39	11
Debrecen	2021–22	23	1	0	0	–	–	–	–	23	1
Debrecen	2022–23	22	3	2	0	–	–	–	–	24	3
Debrecen	2023–24	8	1	0	0	–	–	2	0	10	1
Debrecen	Total	313	59	41	6	26	4	28	2	408	71
Videoton	2016–17	11	0	3	2	–	–	6	1	20	3
Videoton	2017–18	0	0	0	0	–	–	1	0	1	0
Videoton	Total	11	0	3	2	–	–	7	1	21	3
Kazincbarcika	2024–25	0	0	0	0	–	–	–	–	0	0
Tiszakécske	2025–26	0	0	0	0	–	–	–	–	0	0
Career total		377	70	49	9	26	4	35	3	487	86

Updated to games played as of 30 September 2023.
