= Meldin Drešković =

Montenegrin footballer

Personal information
- Date of birth: 26 March 1998 (age 28)
- Place of birth: Plav, FR Yugoslavia
- Height: 1.91 m (6 ft 3 in)
- Position: Central defender

Team information
- Current team: Darmstadt 98
- Number: 14

Senior career*
Years	Team	Apps	(Gls)
2014–2021	Jezero	157	(7)
2016–2017	→ Jedinstvo Bijelo Polje (loan)	4	(0)
2018–2019	→ Podgorica (loan)	23	(0)
2021–2022	Sutjeska Nikšić	33	(2)
2022–2025	Debrecen	63	(5)
2025–	Darmstadt 98	2	(0)
2025–	Darmstadt 98 II	1	(0)
2026	→ Nyíregyháza (loan)	14	(1)

International career^{‡}
2022–	Montenegro	3	(0)
- * Club domestic league appearances and goals as of 30 May 2026 ‡ National team caps and goals as of 18:08, 3 February 2025 (UTC)

Meldin Drešković (born 26 March 1998) is a Montenegrin professional footballer who plays as a centre-back for German 2. Bundesliga club Darmstadt 98.

== Club career ==
On 26 May 2022, Drešković moved to Debrecen in Hungary.

Drešković transferred to 2. Bundesliga club Darmstadt 98 on 3 February 2025. The length of his contract was not disclosed. On 9 January 2026, he returned to Hungary and joined Nyíregyháza until the end of the season.

== International career ==
On 28 March 2022, Drešković made his international debut for Montenegro in an exhibition match against Greece which ended in a 1–0 win for Montenegro.
