= Gergő Gyönyörű =

Hungarian association football player

Personal information
- Date of birth: 12 March 2001 (age 25)
- Place of birth: Téglás, Hungary
- Height: 1.75 m (5 ft 9 in)
- Position: Right winger

Team information
- Current team: Karcagi SE

Youth career
- 2008–2010: Téglás
- 2010–2017: Debrecen

Senior career*
Years	Team	Apps	(Gls)
2017–2022	Debrecen	4	(0)
2017–2022	→ Debrecen II	51	(16)
2020–2021	→ Debreceni EAC (loan)	5	(0)
2022–	Karcagi SE	0	(0)
- * Club domestic league appearances and goals as of 15 May 2022

Gergő Gyönyörű (born 12 March 2001) is a Hungarian football midfielder who plays for Karcagi SE.

== Career statistics ==
As of 15 May 2022

Appearances and goals by club, season and competition
Club	Season	League			Cup		Continental		Other		Total	
Club	Season	Division	Apps	Goals	Apps	Goals	Apps	Goals	Apps	Goals	Apps	Goals
Debrecen II	2017–18	Megyei Bajnokság I	1	0	—		—		—		1	0
Debrecen II	2018–19	Megyei Bajnokság I	5	1	—		—		—		5	1
Debrecen II	2019–20	Nemzeti Bajnokság III	11	1	—		—		—		11	1
Debrecen II	2020–21	Nemzeti Bajnokság III	16	8	—		—		—		16	8
Debrecen II	2021–22	Nemzeti Bajnokság III	18	6	—		—		—		18	6
Debrecen II	Total		51	16	0	0	0	0	0	0	51	16
DEAC	2020–21	Nemzeti Bajnokság II	5	0	2	0	0	0	—		7	0
DEAC	Total		5	0	2	0	0	0	0	0	7	0
Debrecen	2021–22	Nemzeti Bajnokság I	4	0	1	0	0	0	—		5	0
Debrecen	Total		4	0	1	0	0	0	0	0	5	0
Career total			60	16	3	0	0	0	0	0	63	16
