= Alexandros Kyziridis =

Greek footballer (born 2000)

Personal information
- Date of birth: 16 September 2000 (age 26)
- Place of birth: Skydra, Macedonia, Greece
- Height: 1.79 m (5 ft 10 in)
- Position: Winger

Team information
- Current team: Çorum
- Number: 89

Youth career
- 2008–2016: PAOK
- 2016–2017: Veria
- 2017–2018: Panetolikos
- 2018–2019: Iraklis

Senior career*
Years	Team	Apps	(Gls)
2019	Iraklis	1	(0)
2019–2020	Volos	6	(1)
2020–2022	ViOn Zlaté Moravce	63	(11)
2022–2024	Debrecen	28	(2)
2024	→ Mura (loan)	9	(0)
2024–2025	Zemplín Michalovce	26	(15)
2025–2026	Heart of Midlothian	38	(4)
2026–	Çorum	6	(4)

International career^{‡}
2026–	Greece	2	(0)
- * Club domestic league appearances and goals as of 20 October 2026 ‡ National team caps and goals as of 4 October 2026

Alexandros Kyziridis (Greek: Αλέξανδρος Κυζιρίδης; born 16 September 2000) is a Greek professional footballer who plays as a winger for Turkish club Çorum and the Greece national team.

== Career ==
After scoring 15 goals in a season for Zemplín Michalovce, Scottish Premiership side Heart of Midlothian announced they had agreed to sign Kyziridis on a three-year deal. In a friendly against Sunderland, he scored the final goal in a 3–0 win.

On 10 August 2026, Kyziridis joined newly promoted Turkish Süper Lig club Çorum for a reported transfer fee of around £1.7m.

== Honours ==
Individual

- Slovak First Football League U-21 Team of the Season: 2021–22
