= 2023–24 Nemzeti Bajnokság I =

Nemzeti Bajnokság I
- Season: 2023–24
- Dates: 29 July 2023 – 19 May 2024
- Champions: Ferencváros; 35th title
- Relegated: Kisvárda; Mezőkövesd
- Champions League: Ferencváros
- Europa League: Paks
- Conference League: Puskás Akadémia; Fehérvár
- Matches: 198
- Goals: 603 (3.05 per match)
- Top goalscorer: Barnabás Varga (20 goals)
- Biggest home win: Újpest 7–1 Diósgyőr
- Biggest away win: MTK 1–6 Ferencváros; MTK 0–5 Puskás Akadémia; Újpest 0–5 Ferencváros
- Highest scoring: Fehérvár 3–5 Ferencváros; Zalaegerszeg 2–6 Ferencváros; Újpest 5–3 Kecskemét; Diósgyőr 5–3 Debrecen
- Longest winning run: Ferencváros (7 matches)
- Longest unbeaten run: Ferencváros (15 matches)
- Longest winless run: Újpest (9 matches)
- Highest attendance: 20,357; Ferencváros 3–0 Újpest; 29 October 2023
- Lowest attendance: 800; Puskás Akadémia 0–0 Mezőkövesd; 17 December 2023
- Total attendance: 829,651
- Average attendance: 4,187

The 2023–24 Nemzeti Bajnokság I (also known as 2023–24 OTP Bank Liga), also known as NB I, was the 125th season of top-tier football in Hungary. The league was officially named OTP Bank Liga for sponsorship reasons. The fixtures were announced on 22 June 2023. Ferencváros were the 4-time defending champions.

== Teams ==
=== Changes ===
Twelve teams competed in the league – the top ten teams from the previous season and the two teams promoted from the Nemzeti Bajnokság II. The promoted teams are Diósgyőr and MTK Budapest, who returned to the top flight after respective absences of one and two years. They replaced Budapest Honvéd and Vasas, who were relegated to the Nemzeti Bajnokság II after respective spells of nineteen and one years in the top flight.

=== Stadium and locations ===
Note: Table lists in alphabetical order.

Location of teams in 2023–24 Nemzeti Bajnokság I
Location of teams in Budapest

| Team | Location | Stadium | Capacity | 2022–23 |
|---|---|---|---|---|
| Debrecen | Debrecen | Nagyerdei Stadion | 20,340 | 3rd |
| Diósgyőr | Miskolc (Diósgyőr) | Diósgyőri Stadion | 15,325 | 1st (NB II) |
| Fehérvár | Székesfehérvár | Sóstói Stadion | 14,144 | 10th |
| Ferencváros | Budapest (Ferencváros) | Groupama Aréna | 22,043 | 1st |
| Kecskemét | Kecskemét | Széktói Stadion | 6,320 | 2nd |
| Mezőkövesd | Mezőkövesd | Városi Stadion | 4,183 | 7th |
| Kisvárda | Kisvárda | Várkerti Stadion | 3,385 | 6th |
| MTK | Budapest (Józsefváros) | Hidegkuti Nándor Stadion | 5,014 | 2nd (NB II) |
| Puskás Akadémia | Felcsút | Pancho Aréna | 3,816 | 4th |
| Paks | Paks | Fehérvári úti Stadion | 6,150 | 5th |
| Újpest | Budapest (Újpest) | Szusza Ferenc Stadion | 12,670 | 8th |
| Zalaegerszeg | Zalaegerszeg | ZTE Aréna | 11,200 | 9th |

| Debrecen | Diósgyőr | Fehérvár | Ferencváros |
|---|---|---|---|
| Nagyerdei Stadion | Diósgyőri Stadion | Sóstói Stadion | Groupama Aréna |
| Capacity: 20,340 | Capacity: 15,325 | Capacity: 14,201 | Capacity: 22,043 |
| Kecskemét | Kisvárda | Mezőkövesd | MTK |
| Széktói Stadion | Várkerti Stadion | Városi Stadion | Hidegkuti Nándor Stadion |
| Capacity: 6,320 | Capacity: 3,385 | Capacity: 4,183 | Capacity: 5,014 |
| Paks | Puskás Akadémia | Újpest | Zalaegerszeg |
| Fehérvári úti Stadion | Pancho Aréna | Szusza Ferenc Stadion | ZTE Arena |
| Capacity: 6,163 | Capacity: 3,816 | Capacity: 13,432 | Capacity: 11,200 |

=== Personnel and kits ===
All teams were obligated to have the logo of the league sponsor OTP Bank as well as the Nemzeti Bajnokság I logo on the right side of their shirt. Hungarian national sports betting brand Tippmix sponsored all 12 teams of the first league since February 2019, their logo were present on all team kits.

Note: Flags indicate national team as has been defined under FIFA eligibility rules. Players and Managers may hold more than one non-FIFA nationality.

| Team | Head coach | Captain | Kit manufacturer | Main kit sponsor | Other kit sponsor(s) |
|---|---|---|---|---|---|
| Debrecen | (Serbia) Srđan Blagojević | (Hungary) Balázs Dzsudzsák | Adidas | EVE, Tranzit-Food | |
| Diósgyőr | (Serbia) Vladimir Radenković | (Hungary) Gergő Holdampf | 2Rule | Hell | Apollo Tyres^{1}, Borsodi, VW^{2} Miskolc Autó and V-Híd^{3} |
| Fehérvár | (Sweden) Bartosz Grzelak | (Hungary) Attila Fiola | Adidas | None | |
| Ferencváros | (Serbia) Dejan Stanković | (Hungary) Dénes Dibusz | Nike | Telekom | hsagroup^{1}, Groupama^{2}, MVM and VW^{3} |
| Kecskemét | (Hungary) István Szabó | (Hungary) Levente Vágó | Sport36 | HÉP | Kádár Környezetvédelmi Kft.^{1}, Hovány^{2}, Kecskeméti Fürdő and Piroska^{3} |
| Kisvárda | (Hungary) Tamás Feczkó | (Brazil) Lucas | Adidas | MasterGood | |
| Mezőkövesd | (Serbia) Milan Milanović | (Hungary) Tamás Cseri | Adidas | Zsóry Gyógy- és Strandfürdő | Balneo Hotel^{1} |
| MTK | (Hungary) Dávid Horváth | (Hungary) Mihály Kata | Nike | Prohuman | Bayer Construct^{1}, HR-Rent^{2} |
| Paks | (Hungary) György Bognár | (Hungary) János Szabó | Jako | None | |
| Puskás Akadémia | (Slovakia) Zsolt Hornyák | (Hungary) Roland Szolnoki | 2Rule | Mészáros & Mészáros | Duna Aszfalt^{1}, V-Híd^{2} |
| Újpest | (Hungary) Géza Mészöly | (Serbia) Đorđe Nikolić | Puma | None | 11teamsports^{1} |
| Zalaegerszeg | (Hungary) Gábor Márton | (Hungary) Norbert Szendrei | 2Rule | None | Pharos '95^{1}, ZÁÉV^{3} |

1. On the back of shirt.
2. On the sleeves.
3. On the shorts.

=== Managerial changes ===
| Team | Outgoing manager | Manner of departure | Date of vacancy | Position in table | Incoming manager | Date of appointment |
|---|---|---|---|---|---|---|
| Ferencváros | (Russia) Stanislav Cherchesov | Sacked | 19 July 2023 | Pre-season | (Hungary) Csaba Máté^{i} | 20 July 2023 |
| Kisvárda | (Serbia) Miloš Kruščić | Sacked | 12 August 2023 | 6th | (Hungary) Máté Gerliczki^{i} | 12 August 2023 |
| Kisvárda | (Hungary) Máté Gerliczki | End of interim spell | 3 September 2023 | 10th | (Hungary) János Mátyus | 3 September 2023 |
| Ferencváros | (Hungary) Csaba Máté | End of interim spell | 4 September 2023 | 6th | (Serbia) Dejan Stanković | 4 September 2023 |
| Kisvárda | (Hungary) János Mátyus | Resigned | 7 November 2023 | 12th | (Hungary) Tamás Feczkó | 8 November 2023 |
| Zalaegerszeg | (Hungary) Gábor Boér | Resigned | 12 November 2023 | 10th | (Hungary) Gábor Márton | 13 November 2023 |
| Diósgyőr | (Ukraine) (Hungary) Serhiy Kuznetsov | Sacked | 31 January 2024 | 7th | (Hungary) Miklós Simon^{i} | 1 February 2023 |
| Újpest | (Serbia) Nebojša Vignjević | Sacked | 8 February 2024 | 10th | (Hungary) Géza Mészöly | 8 February 2023 |
| Mezőkövesd | (Hungary) Attila Kuttor | Mutual consent | 13 February 2024 | 11th | (Serbia) Milan Milanović | 14 February 2023 |
| Diósgyőr | (Hungary) Miklós Simon | End of interim spell | 14 February 2024 | 8th | (Serbia) Vladimir Radenković | 14 February 2024 |

== League table ==
| Pos | Team | Pld | W | D | L | GF | GA | GD | Pts | Qualification or relegation |
|---|---|---|---|---|---|---|---|---|---|---|
| 1 | Ferencváros (C) | 33 | 23 | 5 | 5 | 80 | 30 | +50 | 74 | Qualification for the Champions League second qualifying round (Note: Since already qualified Real Madrid won the Champions League, Ferencváros was promoted to the Champions League second qualifying round as one of the two champions with the highest coefficient in Champions League qualifying.) |
| 2 | Paks | 33 | 17 | 7 | 9 | 51 | 42 | +9 | 58 | Qualification for the Europa League first qualifying round (Note: Paks qualified for the Europa League first qualifying round by winning the 2023–24 Magyar Kupa. Since they qualified based on league position, the second Conference League second round spot was passed to the fourth-placed team.) |
| 3 | Puskás Akadémia | 33 | 15 | 10 | 8 | 60 | 35 | +25 | 55 | Qualification for the Conference League second qualifying round |
| 4 | Fehérvár | 33 | 16 | 6 | 11 | 55 | 40 | +15 | 54 | Qualification for the Conference League second qualifying round |
| 5 | Debrecen | 33 | 14 | 6 | 13 | 49 | 48 | +1 | 48 | |
| 6 | Kecskemét | 33 | 13 | 6 | 14 | 45 | 45 | 0 | 45 | |
| 7 | Diósgyőr | 33 | 12 | 9 | 12 | 50 | 56 | −6 | 45 | |
| 8 | MTK | 33 | 12 | 8 | 13 | 43 | 62 | −19 | 44 | |
| 9 | Zalaegerszeg | 33 | 12 | 7 | 14 | 54 | 60 | −6 | 43 | |
| 10 | Újpest | 33 | 11 | 4 | 18 | 45 | 67 | −22 | 37 | |
| 11 | Kisvárda (R) | 33 | 9 | 4 | 20 | 40 | 55 | −15 | 31 | Relegation to the Nemzeti Bajnokság II |
| 12 | Mezőkövesd (R) | 33 | 5 | 6 | 22 | 31 | 63 | −32 | 21 | Relegation to the Nemzeti Bajnokság II |

Source: Hungarian Football Federation (in Hungarian), Soccerway
Rules for classification: 1) Points; 2) Matches won; 3) Goal difference; 4) Goals scored; 5) Head-to-head points; 6) Head-to-head goal difference; 7) Fair play ranking; 8) Drawing of lots.
(C) Champions; (R) Relegated

== Results ==
| Home \ Away | FER | PAK | FEH | PUS | DEB | MTK | KEC | ZAL | DIO | UJP | KIS | MEZ | FER | PAK | FEH | PUS | DEB | MTK | KEC | ZAL | DIO | UJP | KIS | MEZ |
|---|---|---|---|---|---|---|---|---|---|---|---|---|---|---|---|---|---|---|---|---|---|---|---|---|
| Ferencváros | | 6–1 | 0–1 | 1–2 | 2–2 | 5–1 | 1–0 | 3–0 | 2–1 | 3–0 | 1–0 | 0–0 | | 1–0 | | 1–1 | 5–1 | | 2–0 | | | 2–0 | 0–0 | |
| Paks | 3–2 | | 2–0 | 2–1 | 2–0 | 0–0 | 1–0 | 3–4 | 4–1 | 3–0 | 3–1 | 2–1 | | | 1–2 | | 1–1 | | | | | 1–2 | 2–1 | 2–1 |
| Fehérvár | 3–5 | 3–0 | | 3–1 | 1–0 | 3–0 | 3–3 | 3–3 | 4–0 | 2–1 | 3–1 | 2–0 | 0–2 | | | | | 4–0 | | 1–1 | 0–0 | | | 5–0 |
| Puskás Akadémia | 1–1 | 0–2 | 2–2 | | 1–1 | 6–1 | 3–0 | 0–1 | 0–0 | 3–3 | 1–0 | 0–0 | | 5–0 | 0–0 | | 4–1 | | | | | 0–2 | 4–2 | |
| Debrecen | 1–2 | 1–0 | 3–1 | 1–0 | | 1–3 | 2–0 | 1–0 | 2–2 | 1–2 | 4–1 | 3–1 | | | 1–0 | | | 1–2 | 1–0 | 5–1 | | 1–0 | | 0–1 |
| MTK | 1–6 | 1–1 | 0–2 | 0–5 | 2–1 | | 1–0 | 2–0 | 2–1 | 3–0 | 0–0 | 3–1 | 1–2 | 0–2 | | 1–3 | | | 2–2 | | 1–1 | | 2–1 | |
| Kecskemét | 2–1 | 1–1 | 1–0 | 4–1 | 1–1 | 1–2 | | 3–1 | 2–1 | 1–0 | 3–1 | 0–2 | | 0–0 | 0–1 | 1–2 | | | | 2–1 | | | 3–1 | 2–1 |
| Zalaegerszeg | 2–6 | 2–5 | 3–1 | 1–1 | 1–2 | 2–1 | 3–1 | | 1–3 | 1–1 | 0–2 | 1–1 | 2–3 | 1–1 | | 1–0 | | 2–2 | | | 5–1 | | | |
| Diósgyőr | 1–2 | 1–1 | 4–0 | 0–1 | 3–1 | 3–3 | 3–1 | 0–3 | | 1–2 | 2–0 | 2–0 | 2–0 | 2–1 | | 1–1 | 5–3 | | 0–0 | | | | 1–1 | |
| Újpest | 0–5 | 1–2 | 2–1 | 1–2 | 1–2 | 0–2 | 5–3 | 2–1 | 2–0 | | 3–2 | 1–1 | | | 2–0 | | | 1–2 | 0–3 | 1–5 | 7–0 | | | 2–2 |
| Kisvárda | 1–3 | 0–1 | 1–2 | 0–2 | 0–0 | 3–1 | 1–2 | 0–1 | 1–2 | 4–0 | | 2–1 | | | 1–0 | | 1–3 | | | 1–0 | | 4–1 | | 4–3 |
| Mezőkövesd | 0–2 | 0–1 | 0–2 | 1–3 | 2–1 | 1–0 | 0–3 | 1–2 | 2–4 | 4–0 | 1–2 | | 0–3 | | | 0–4 | | 1–1 | | 1–2 | 1–2 | | | |

Source: Hungarian Football Federation (in Hungarian), Soccerway
Legend: Blue = home team win; Yellow = draw; Red = away team win.
For upcoming matches, an "a" indicates there is an article about the rivalry between the two participants.

== Season statistics ==
=== Top goalscorers ===
| Rank | Player | Club | Goals |
|---|---|---|---|
| 1 | (Hungary) Barnabás Varga | Ferencváros | 20 |
| 2 | (Croatia) Antonio Mance | Zalaegerszeg | 15 |
| 3 | (Bosnia and Herzegovina) Kenan Kodro | Fehérvár / Ferencváros | 13 |
| 4 | (Hungary) Krisztofer Horváth | Kecskemét | 11 |
| 4 | (Hungary) Norbert Könyves | Paks | 11 |
| 4 | (Hungary) Zsolt Nagy | Puskás Akadémia | 11 |
| 7 | (Serbia) Stefan Dražić | Mezőkövesd | 10 |
| 7 | (Serbia) Matija Ljujić | Újpest | 10 |
| 9 | (Nigeria) Peter Ambrose | Újpest | 9 |
| 9 | (Hungary) István Bognár | MTK | 9 |
| 9 | (Norway) Tobias Christensen | Fehérvár | 9 |
| 9 | (France) Yohan Croizet | Zalaegerszeg | 9 |
| 9 | (Hungary) József Windecker | Paks | 9 |

=== Hat-tricks ===
| Player | For | Against | Result | Date | Round |
|---|---|---|---|---|---|
| (Serbia) Matija Ljujić | Újpest | Puskás Akadémia | 3–3 (A) | 4 August 2023 | 2 |
| (Hungary) Barnabás Varga | Ferencváros | Paks | 6–0 (H) | 27 August 2023 | 5 |
| (Hungary) Barnabás Varga | Ferencváros | Zalaegerszeg | 2–6 (A) | 3 September 2023 | 6 |
| (Hungary) Mátyás Katona | Fehérvár | Kecskemét | 3–3 (H) | 26 November 2023 | 14 |
| (Hungary) Barnabás Varga | Ferencváros | MTK | 5–1 (H) | 6 February 2024 | 19 |

=== Attendances ===
| Pos | Team | Total | High | Low | Average | Change |
|---|---|---|---|---|---|---|
| 1 | Ferencváros | 192,772 | 20,357 | 6,127 | 11,340 | +8.7% |
| 2 | Diósgyőr | 109,335 | 12,178 | 3,412 | 6,432 | +67.8%^{1} |
| 3 | Debrecen | 91,347 | 12,114 | 3,664 | 5,373 | −2.2% |
| 4 | Újpest | 86,010 | 11,202 | 2,610 | 5,059 | +35.3% |
| 5 | Fehérvár | 64,017 | 8,061 | 1,752 | 4,001 | +23.5% |
| 6 | Zalaegerszeg | 48,795 | 9,068 | 1,755 | 3,050 | +22.4% |
| 7 | Kecskemét | 50,183 | 4,957 | 1,824 | 2,952 | +4.1% |
| 8 | MTK | 47,469 | 5,014 | 1,734 | 2,792 | +182.3%^{1} |
| 9 | Paks | 40,491 | 4,201 | 1,712 | 2,531 | +18.5% |
| 10 | Mezőkövesd | 33,996 | 4,125 | 1,497 | 2,130 | +2.1% |
| 11 | Kisvárda | 32,644 | 3,150 | 1,200 | 2,040 | −9.8% |
| 12 | Puskás Akadémia | 32,052 | 3,700 | 800 | 2,003 | +21.5% |
| | League total | 829,651 | 20,357 | 800 | 4,187 | +18.3% |

Source: magyarfutball (in Hungarian)
Notes:
1. Team played last season in NB II.

=== Number of teams by counties and regions ===
Number of teams by counties
| Pos. | County (megye) | No. of teams | Teams |
|---|---|---|---|
| 1 | Budapest | 3 | Ferencváros, MTK and Újpest |
| 2 | Fejér | 2 | Fehérvár and Puskás Akadémia |
| 2 | Borsod-Abaúj-Zemplén | 2 | Diósgyőr and Mezőkövesd |
| 4 | Bács-Kiskun | 1 | Kecskemét |
| 4 | Hajdú-Bihar | 1 | Debrecen |
| 4 | Szabolcs-Szatmár-Bereg | 1 | Kisvárda |
| 4 | Tolna | 1 | Paks |
| 4 | Zala | 1 | Zalaegerszeg |

Number of teams by regions
| Transdanubia | Central Hungary | Great Plain and North |
|---|---|---|
| Fehérvár; Paks; Puskás Akadémia; Zalaegerszeg | Ferencváros; MTK; Újpest | Debrecen; Diósgyőr; Kecskemét; Kisvárda; Mezőkövesd |
| 4 Teams | 3 Teams | 5 Teams |

== Awards ==
=== Monthly awards ===
| Month | Player of the Month | | Head coach of the Month | | Goal of the Month | | Save of the Month | | References |
| Month | Manager | Club | Player | Club | Player | Club | Player | Club | References |
|---|---|---|---|---|---|---|---|---|---|
| August | (Serbia) Matija Ljujić | Újpest | (Ukraine) (Hungary) Serhiy Kuznetsov | Diósgyőr | (Montenegro) Stefan Lončar | Debrecen | (Hungary) Dávid Banai | Újpest | |
| September | (Hungary) Barnabás Varga | Ferencváros | (Hungary) György Bognár | Paks | (Bosnia and Herzegovina) Jasmin Mešanović | Kisvárda | (Hungary) Dénes Dibusz | Ferencváros | |
| October | (Croatia) Antonio Mance | Zalaegerszeg | (Serbia) Dejan Stanković | Ferencváros | (Hungary) Soma Szuhodovszki | Kecskemét | (Hungary) Ádám Varga | Ferencváros | |

== See also ==
- 2023–24 Magyar Kupa
- 2023–24 Nemzeti Bajnokság II
- 2023–24 Nemzeti Bajnokság III
- 2023–24 Megyei Bajnokság I
