= Márk Szécsi =

Hungarian footballer

Personal information
- Full name: Márk Szécsi
- Date of birth: 22 May 1994 (age 32)
- Place of birth: Eger, Hungary
- Height: 1.78 m (5 ft 10 in)
- Position: Forward

Team information
- Current team: Debrecen
- Number: 88

Youth career
- 2006: Jászapáti
- 2006–2011: Debrecen

Senior career*
Years	Team	Apps	(Gls)
2011–2013	Debrecen II	33	(9)
2012–2016	Debrecen	25	(0)
2014	→ Kecskemét (loan)	12	(1)
2014	→ Nyíregyháza (loan)	5	(0)
2016–2017	Nyíregyháza	30	(3)
2017–2019	Puskás Akadémia	12	(0)
2018–2019	→ Debrecen (loan)	25	(8)
2019–	Debrecen	184	(36)

International career
2010–2011	Hungary U-17	6	(4)
2011–2013	Hungary U-19	9	(5)
2013	Hungary U-21	3	(0)
- * Club domestic league appearances and goals as of 30 May 2026

Márk Szécsi (born 22 May 1994 in Eger) is a Hungarian football player currently playing for the Hungarian team Debreceni VSC as a midfielder.

== Club statistics ==
Club	Season	League			Cup		League Cup		Europe		Total	
Club	Season	Division	Apps	Goals	Apps	Goals	Apps	Goals	Apps	Goals	Apps	Goals
Debrecen	2011–12	Nemzeti Bajnokság I	0	0	1	0	2	0	0	0	3	0
Debrecen	2012–13	Nemzeti Bajnokság I	11	0	5	0	4	0	0	0	20	0
Debrecen	2013–14	Nemzeti Bajnokság I	4	0	3	0	6	1	0	0	13	1
Debrecen	2014–15	Nemzeti Bajnokság I	3	0	0	0	3	0	0	0	6	0
Debrecen	2015–16	Nemzeti Bajnokság I	7	0	5	1	0	0	0	0	12	1
Debrecen	2018–19	Nemzeti Bajnokság I	25	8	6	1	0	0	0	0	31	9
Debrecen	2019–20	Nemzeti Bajnokság I	31	9	1	0	0	0	4	0	36	9
Debrecen	2020–21	Nemzeti Bajnokság II	33	14	4	2	—		—		37	16
Debrecen	2021–22	Nemzeti Bajnokság I	11	2	0	0	—		—		11	2
Debrecen	Total		125	33	25	4	15	1	4	0	169	38
Kecskemét	2013–14	Nemzeti Bajnokság I	12	1	0	0	0	0	0	0	12	1
Kecskemét	Total		12	1	0	0	0	0	0	0	12	1
Nyíregyháza	2014–15	Nemzeti Bajnokság I	5	0	0	0	1	1	0	0	6	1
Nyíregyháza	2016–17	Nemzeti Bajnokság II	30	3	2	0	0	0	0	0	32	3
Nyíregyháza	Total		35	3	2	0	1	1	0	0	38	4
Puskás Akadémia	2017–18	Nemzeti Bajnokság I	12	0	2	0	0	0	0	0	14	0
Puskás Akadémia	Total		12	0	2	0	0	0	0	0	14	0
Career total			184	37	29	4	16	2	4	0	233	43

Updated to games played as of 15 May 2022.
