= Erik Kusnyír =

Hungarian footballer

Personal information
- Full name: Erik Kusnyír
- Date of birth: 7 February 2000 (age 26)
- Place of birth: Nyzhniy Koropets, Ukraine
- Height: 1.77 m (5 ft 10 in)
- Position: Midfielder

Team information
- Current team: Debrecen
- Number: 29

Youth career
- 2012–2014: Munkach Mukachevo
- 2014–2016: Karpaty Lviv
- 2017–2018: Debrecen

Senior career*
Years	Team	Apps	(Gls)
2016–2017	Tarpa SC	6	(0)
2018–	Debrecen	131	(5)

International career^{‡}
2021	Hungary U21	1	(0)
- * Club domestic league appearances and goals as of 30 May 2026 ‡ National team caps and goals as of 2 September 2021

Erik Kusnyír (born 7 February 2000) is a professional footballer who plays for NB I club Debreceni VSC. Born in Ukraine, he has represented Hungary at youth level.

== Club career ==
=== Debrecen ===
On 5 May 2018, Kusnyír played his first match for Debrecen in a 3–1 win against Budapest Honvéd in the Hungarian League.

== International career ==
In May 2019, he was called for the first time to the Ukraine national team for training camp by manager Andriy Shevchenko.

== Career statistics ==
As of 15 May 2022

Appearances and goals by club, season and competition
Club	Season	League		Cup		Europe		Total	
Club	Season	Apps	Goals	Apps	Goals	Apps	Goals	Apps	Goals
Debrecen
Debrecen	2017–18	5	0	3	0	–	–	8	0
Debrecen	2018–19	22	0	5	0	–	–	27	0
Debrecen	2019–20	29	1	1	0	4	0	34	1
Debrecen	2020–21	9	0	2	0	–	–	11	0
Debrecen	2021–22	14	0	1	0	–	–	15	0
Debrecen	Total	79	1	12	0	4	0	95	1
Career total		79	1	12	0	4	0	95	1
