= 2024–25 Debreceni VSC season =

Debrecen
2024–25 season
- Chairman: Ike Thierry Zaengel
- Manager: Nestor El Maestro (From 11 November 2024)
- Stadium: Nagyerdei Stadion
- Nemzeti Bajnokság I: 9th
- Magyar Kupa: Round of 32
- Top goalscorer: League: Bárány (13); All: Bárány (16)
- Highest home attendance: 10,634 v Ferencváros, 9 March 2025, NB I, R23
- Lowest home attendance: 2,612 v Kecskemét, 24 Nov. 2024, NB I, R14
- Average home league attendance: 5,680
- Biggest win: 4–0 v Békéscsaba (A), 14 September 2024, Magyar Kupa, Round of 64
- Biggest defeat: 0–5 v Paks (H), 19 October 2024, NB I, R10
- All statistics correct as of 24 May 2025.

The 2024–25 season is Debreceni Vasutas Sport Club's 46th competitive season, 4th consecutive season in the Nemzeti Bajnokság I and 122nd year in existence as a football club. In addition to the domestic league, Debrecen participated in this season's editions of the Magyar Kupa.

== Kits ==
Supplier: Adidas / Sponsor: Tranzit-Food / Tippmix / Short sponsor: Tippmix

Adidas's Three Stripes trademark
Home	Home alt. 1	Home alt. 2	Away	Third
Goalkeeper^{1}	Goalkeeper^{2}	Goalkeeper^{3}	Goalkeeper^{4}

=== Kit usage ===
The number of the round is indicated in parentheses.

Kit	Combination							
Kit	Combination	Total			Nemzeti Bajnokság I		Magyar Kupa	
Kit	Combination	Season	Home	Away	Home	Away	Home	Away
Home	Red shirt, white sleeves with red stripes, red shorts and red socks.	5	4	1	ZAL(6) MTK(8) NYI(18) DIO(26)	PUS(9)		
Home alt. 1	Red shirt, white sleeves with red stripes, white shorts and white socks.	4	4	0	KEC(14) FER(1) FER(23) MTK(30)			
Home alt. 2	Red shirt, red shorts and red socks.	1	0	1		FEH(33)		
Away	White shirt, red sleeves with white stripes, white shorts and white socks.	16	7	9	DIO(4) PAK(10) GYO(13) UJP(16) PUS(20) ZAL(28) PAK(32)	GYO(2) KEC(3) NYI(7) ZAL(17) PAK(21) KEC(25) NYI(29)		BEK(R64) MEZ(R32)
Third	Black shirt, black shorts and black socks.	9	1	8	FEH(22)	UJP(5) FEH(11) FER(12) DIO(15) MTK(19) GYO(24) UJP(27) PUS(31)		
Goalkeeper^{1}	Light blue shirt, light blue shorts and light blue socks.	12	7	5	DIO(4) MTK(8) PAK(10) FER(1) FER(23) DIO(26) PAK(32)	GYO(2) FER(12) PAK(21) GYO(24) FEH(33)		
Goalkeeper^{2}	Green shirt with yellow stripe, green shorts and green socks.	21	7	14	KEC(14) UJP(16) NYI(18) PUS(20) FEH(22) ZAL(28) MTK(30)	KEC(3) UJP(5) NYI(7) PUS(9) FEH(11) DIO(15) ZAL(17) MTK(19) KEC(25) UJP(27) NYI(29) PUS(31)		BEK(R64) MEZ(R32)
Goalkeeper^{3}	Black shirt with red stripes, black shorts and black socks.	2	2	0	ZAL(6) GYO(13)			

BEK: Békéscsaba; DIO: Diósgyőr; FEH: Fehérvár; FER: Ferencváros; GYO: Győr; KEC: Kecskemét; MEZ: Mezőkövesd; MTK: MTK Budapest; NYI: Nyíregyháza; PAK: Paks; PUS: Puskás Akadémia; UJP: Újpest; ZAL: Zalaegerszeg;
R64: Round of 64; R32: Round of 32;

== First team squad ==
As of 31 March 2025

Note: Flags indicate national team as defined under FIFA eligibility rules; some limited exceptions apply. Players may hold more than one non-FIFA nationality.

No.	Pos.	Nation	Player
16	GK	HUN	Balázs Megyeri
47	GK	HUN	Krisztián Hegyi (on loan from (England) West Ham United)
57	GK	JPN	Shūichi Gonda
86	GK	HUN	Donát Pálfi
4	DF	ALB	Jorgo Pëllumbi
5	DF	HUN	Bence Batik
11	DF	HUN	János Ferenczi
15	DF	SWE	Henrik Castegren
26	DF	HUN	Ádám Lang
27	DF	HUN	Gergő Kocsis
28	DF	AUT	Maximilian Hofmann
29	DF	HUN	Erik Kusnyír
30	DF	SRB	Aranđel Stojković
6	MF	CRO	Neven Đurasek

No.	Pos.	Nation	Player
10	MF	HUN	Balázs Dzsudzsák (captain)
13	MF	HUN	Soma Szuhodovszki
20	MF	CAF	Amos Youga
21	MF	HUN	Dominik Kocsis
22	MF	HUN	Botond Vajda
33	MF	BUL	Kristiyan Malinov
76	MF	UKR	Iván Polozhyi
99	MF	FRA	Brandon Domingues
8	FW	HUN	Tamás Szűcs
17	FW	HUN	Donát Bárány
18	FW	NGR	Shedrach Kaye
25	FW	BRA	Maurides (on loan from (Germany) St. Pauli)
42	FW	CIV	Yacouba Silue
77	FW	HUN	Márk Szécsi (vice-captain)

== Transfers ==
=== Summer ===
In: Note: Flags indicate national team as defined under FIFA eligibility rules; some limited exceptions apply. Players may hold more than one non-FIFA nationality.

No.	Pos.	Nation	Player
—	MF	HUN	Máté Tuboly (loan return from (Hungary) Győr)
—	FW	SRB	Andrija Majdevac (loan return from (Serbia) Kruševac)
89	MF	GRE	Alexandros Kyziridis (loan return from (Slovenia) Mura)
8	FW	HUN	Tamás Szűcs (from (Denmark) Copenhagen)
5	DF	HUN	Bence Batik (from (Hungary) Puskás Akadémia)
86	GK	HUN	Donát Pálfi (from (Hungary) Haladás)
24	FW	JPN	Naoaki Senaga (from (Montenegro) Jezero)
30	DF	SRB	Aranđel Stojković (from (Serbia) Partizan)
—	FW	HUN	Máté Kohut (from (Hungary) Debreceni VSC II)
23	MF	ARM	Zhirayr Shaghoyan (on loan from (Armenia) Ararat)
6	MF	CRO	Neven Đurasek (from (Greece) Aris)
42	FW	CIV	Yacouba Silue (from (Serbia) Mladost Lučani)
26	MF	BRA	Victor Braga (from (Kazakhstan) Zhetysu)
27	DF	HUN	Gergő Kocsis (from (Hungary) MTK Budapest)

Out: Note: Flags indicate national team as defined under FIFA eligibility rules; some limited exceptions apply. Players may hold more than one non-FIFA nationality.

No.	Pos.	Nation	Player
67	FW	SUI	João Oliveira (to (Poland) Arka Gdynia)
—	MF	HUN	Máté Tuboly (to (Slovakia) DAC)
25	DF	HUN	Nimród Baranyai (to (Hungary) Újpest)
—	FW	SRB	Andrija Majdevac (to (Greece) Panetolikos)
20	MF	MNE	Stefan Lončar (to (Russia) Akron Tolyatti)
27	MF	HUN	Ádám Bódi (to (Hungary) Kazincbarcika)
21	DF	UKR	Oleksandr Romanchuk (to (Ukraine) Kryvbas Kryvyi Rih)
—	FW	HUN	Erik Kócs-Washburn (to (Hungary) Kozármisleny)
15	MF	ESP	Christian Manrique (to (Spain) Alcorcón)
18	MF	NGR	Hamzat Ojediran (to (France) Lens)
89	MF	GRE	Alexandros Kyziridis (to (Slovakia) Zemplín Michalovce)

=== Winter ===
In: Note: Flags indicate national team as defined under FIFA eligibility rules; some limited exceptions apply. Players may hold more than one non-FIFA nationality.

No.	Pos.	Nation	Player
20	MF	CAF	Amos Youga (from (Bulgaria) CSKA Sofia)
33	MF	BUL	Kristiyan Malinov (from (Belgium) Kortrijk)
28	DF	AUT	Maximilian Hofmann (from (Austria) Rapid Wien)
47	GK	HUN	Krisztián Hegyi (on loan from (England) West Ham United)
26	DF	HUN	Ádám Lang (from (Cyprus) Omonia Nicosia)
—	MF	HUN	Mátyás Vidnyánszky (from (Slovakia) DAC)
25	FW	BRA	Maurides (on loan from (Germany) St. Pauli)
15	DF	SWE	Henrik Castegren (from (Sweden) Sirius)
57	GK	JPN	Shūichi Gonda (from (Japan) Shimizu S-Pulse)

Out: Note: Flags indicate national team as defined under FIFA eligibility rules; some limited exceptions apply. Players may hold more than one non-FIFA nationality.

No.	Pos.	Nation	Player
26	MF	BRA	Victor Braga (to (Kazakhstan) Tobol Kostanay)
23	MF	ARM	Zhirayr Shaghoyan (to FC Ararat-Armenia)
94	DF	MNE	Dušan Lagator (to (India) Kerala Blasters FC)
24	FW	JPN	Naoaki Senaga (Mutual agreement)
3	DF	HUN	Csaba Hornyák (on loan to (Hungary) Mezőkövesd)
—	MF	HUN	Mátyás Vidnyánszky (on loan to (Hungary) Mezőkövesd)
14	MF	MNE	Meldin Drešković (to (Germany) Darmstadt)
74	FW	HUN	Máté Kohut (on loan to (Hungary) Békéscsaba)
84	GK	HUN	Márk Engedi (on loan to (Hungary) Tiszakécske)
19	FW	ISL	Thorleifur Úlfarsson (Mutual agreement)

=== Out on loan ===
Note: Flags indicate national team as defined under FIFA eligibility rules; some limited exceptions apply. Players may hold more than one non-FIFA nationality.

No.	Pos.	Nation	Player
12	GK	HUN	Benedek Erdélyi (at (Hungary) BVSC (NB II) until 30 June 2025)
—	DF	HUN	Kristóf Gyenti (at (Hungary) Békéscsaba (NB II) until 30 June 2025)
45	FW	HUN	Tamás Batai (at (Hungary) BVSC (NB II) until 30 June 2025)
—	FW	NGR	David Nwachukwu (at (Hungary) BVSC (NB II) until 30 June 2025)
—	MF	HUN	Flórián Cibla (at (Hungary) Mezőkövesd (NB II) until 30 June 2025)
3	DF	HUN	Csaba Hornyák (at (Hungary) Mezőkövesd (NB II) until 30 June 2025)
74	FW	HUN	Máté Kohut (at (Hungary) Békéscsaba (NB II) until 30 June 2025)
84	GK	HUN	Márk Engedi (at (Hungary) Tiszakécske (NB III) until 30 June 2025)

=== Contract extension ===
Note: Flags indicate national team as defined under FIFA eligibility rules; some limited exceptions apply. Players may hold more than one non-FIFA nationality.

No.	Pos.	Nation	Player
8	FW	HUN	Tamás Szűcs (until 30 June 2027)

=== New contracts ===
The following Debreceni VSC players signed their first or new professional contracts with the club.

Date	Age	Pos.	Player	Contract type	Ref.
First team
2 September 2024	16	DF	(Hungary) Botond Nyikos	First professional contract	
9 September 2024	18	MF	(Hungary) Levente Szakács	First professional contract	
21 February 2025	16	DF	(Hungary) Milán Sánta	First professional contract	
Academy

=== Managerial changes ===
Outgoing manager	Manner of departure	Date of vacancy	Position in table	Incoming manager	Date of appointment	Ref.
(Serbia) Srđan Blagojević	Resigned	26 August 2024	10th	(Hungary) Tibor Dombi^{c}	26 August 2024	
(Hungary) Tibor Dombi^{c}	Caretaker	31 August 2024	8th	(Hungary) Csaba Máté	1 September 2024	
(Hungary) Csaba Máté	Sacked	27 October 2024	11th	(Hungary) Tibor Dombi^{c}	27 October 2024	
(Hungary) Tibor Dombi^{c}	Caretaker	11 November 2024	11th	(Serbia) Nestor El Maestro	11 November 2024	

^{c} = Caretaker

== Friendlies ==
Win Draw Loss Fixtures

=== Pre-season ===
29 June 2024 Friendly	Debrecen	6–3	Cigánd (NB III)	Debrecen–Pallag
18:00 CEST	Dzsudzsák 5'; D. Kocsis 27', 41'; T. Szűcs 44'; Polozhy 59'; Ojediran 61'	Report	Honchar 50'; Bodan 79'; Jónás 86'	Stadium: DLA; Attendance: 0 (closed doors)
Note: DVSC: Pálfi — M. Szécsi, Lagator, Romanchuk, J. Ferenczi, Manrique, D. Kocsis, Vajda, T. Szűcs, Domingues, Dzsudzsák • Substitutions: Engedi (GK), Szuhodovszki, Hornyák, Nwachukwu, Senaga, Lénárt, Patai, Perpék, Polozhy, Kyziridis, Ojediran, Kócs-Washburn, Kohut

6 July 2024 Friendly	Debrecen	3–3	Kazincbarcika (NB II)	Debrecen–Pallag
17:00 CEST	Bárány 22'; M. Szécsi 45'; Manrique 50'		Herjeczki 7'; Pethő 39'; Pintér 67'	Stadium: DLA; Attendance: 0 (closed doors)
Note: DVSC: Megyeri — Stojković, Lagator, Romanchuk, J. Ferenczi, Ojediran, Szuhodovszki, Dzsudzsák, M. Szécsi, Domingues, Bárány • Substitutions: Pálfi (GK), Hornyák, Polozhy, Manrique, Kyziridis, Nwachukwu, Senaga, D. Kocsis, Kohut

9 July 2024 Friendly	Slovan Liberec (Czech I) (Czech Republic)	4–0	Debrecen	Ottensheim, Austria
17:30 CEST	Icha 29'; Frýdek 50'; Tanner (yellow card) 62'; Dulay 64', 70'	1 2	Lagator (yellow card) 36'	Referee: Heiduck; Assistant referees: Platzer, Reitinger
Note: DVSC: Megyeri — Stojković, Lagator, Romanchuk, J. Ferenczi — Ojediran, Manrique — D. Kocsis, Dzsudzsák, Domingues — Bárány • Substitutions: Pálfi (GK), Szuhodovszki, M. Szécsi, Hornyák, Senaga, Kohut, Polozhy

13 July 2024 Friendly	Rapid Vienna (Austrian I) (Austria)	3–2	Debrecen	Hausmening, Austria
16:30 CEST; 60+45 min.	Beljo 7'; Bischof 70'; Dursun 102'	Report	Romanchuk 20'; Dzsudzsák 60+3'	Stadium: Peter-Lisec-Stadion
Note: DVSC: Megyeri — Stojković, Lagator, Romanchuk, J. Ferenczi — Ojediran, Szuhodovszki — M. Szécsi, Dzsudzsák, Domingues — Bárány • Substitutions: Engedi (GK), Manrique, Kohut, Senaga, T. Szűcs, Polozhy, Hornyák, Shaghoyan, Vajda

18 July 2024 Friendly	Žilina (Slovak I) (Slovakia)	1–2	Debrecen	Enns, Austria
18:00 CEST	Kaprálik (red card) 43'; Hranica 85'	Report	Ojediran (yellow card) 37'; Lagator (red card) 43'; T. Szűcs 60'; Bárány 66'	Stadium: Enns Arena; Referee: Basić; Assistant referees: Kettlgrüber, Akbel
Note: DVSC: Megyeri — Stojković, Romanchuk (Drešković (substituted on) 80'), Lagator, J. Ferenczi — Ojediran (Szuhodovszki (substituted on) 80'), T. Szűcs (Manrique (substituted on) 74') — Vajda (Pëllumbi (substituted on) 67'), Dzsudzsák (Shaghoyan (substituted on) 74'), Domingues (M. Szécsi (substituted on) 67') — Bárány (D. Kocsis (substituted on) 80')

19 July 2024 Friendly	Ried (Austrian II) (Austria)	1–1	Debrecen	Ried im Innkreis, Austria
18:00 CEST	Beganović 90+3'	Report	Vajda 89'	Stadium: Innviertel Arena; Referee: Sebastian Rothbauer
Note: DVSC: Engedi — Senaga (Polozhy (substituted on) 79'), Pëllumbi (Drešković (substituted on) 46'), Lagator, Hornyák — Szuhodovszki (Stojković (substituted on) 91'), Manrique (Ojediran (substituted on) 82') — D. Kocsis, M. Szécsi (T. Szűcs (substituted on) 81'), Shaghoyan (Vajda (substituted on) 84') — Kohut

29 July 2024 Friendly	Debrecen	3–1	Karcag (NB III)	Debrecen–Pallag
18:00 CEST	J. Ferenczi 6'; Domingues 48'; Bárány 55'	Report	Sági 81'	Stadium: DLA; Attendance: 0
Note: DVSC: Megyeri — Stojković, Lagator (Drešković (substituted on) 65'), Pëllumbi, J. Ferenczi — Ojediran (D. Kocsis (substituted on) 65'), T. Szűcs (Đurasek (substituted on) 73' (substituted off) 77' (Polozhy (substituted on) 77') — Vajda, Dzsudzsák (Szuhodovszki (substituted on) 65'), Domingues (Shaghoyan (substituted on) 65') — Bárány (M. Szécsi (substituted on) 73')

=== In-season ===
7 September 2024 Friendly	Debrecen	2–2	(Romania) Bihor Oradea (Romanian II)	Debrecen
11:00 CEST	Bárány 23', 28'	Report	Gidea 12'; Iovita 90+1'	Stadium: Nagyerdei Stadion; Attendance: 0 (closed doors)
Note: DVSC: Megyeri (Pálfi (substituted on) 46') — G. Kocsis, Pëllumbi ((Mona (substituted on) 87'), Drešković, Ferenczi (Lénárt (substituted on) 87') — D. Kocsis, Szuhodovszki (Đurasek (substituted on) 55'), Braga, Dzsudzsák (Senaga (substituted on) 55'), Domingues (T. Szűcs (substituted on) 46') — Bárány (Silue (substituted on) 46') • Coach: Csaba Máté

12 October 2024 Friendly	Debrecen	4–2	Békéscsaba (NB II)	Debrecen–Pallag
12:00 CEST	Bárány 13' (pen.); Szuhodovszki 53', 70' (pen.); Shedrach 90'	Report	Vólent 36', 56' (pen.)	Stadium: DLA; Attendance: 0 (closed doors)
Note: DVSC: Megyeri — Stojković, G. Kocsis, Pëllumbi, Ferenczi, Braga, Szuhodovszki, Senaga, Dzsudzsák, Domingues, Bárány • Substitutions: Pálfi (GK), Drešković, Sain, Shedrach, Lénárt, Silue, M. Szécsi, Polozhy, Lagator • Manager: Csaba Máté

15 November 2024 Friendly	Debrecen	1–1	Mezőkövesd (NB II)	Debrecen
	Silue 67'	Report	Ináncsi 79'	Stadium: Nagyerdei Stadion; Attendance: 0 (closed doors)
Note: DVSC: Megyeri — Stojković, Drešković, Lagator (Polozhy (substituted on) 84'), Pëllumbi, Ferenczi, D. Kocsis (Senaga (substituted on) 46'), Braga (Shedrach (substituted on) 68'), Szuhodovszki, M. Szécsi (Domingues (substituted on) 46'), Bárány (Silue (substituted on) 46') • Manager: Nestor El Maestro

9 January 2025 Friendly	Debrecen	1–2	UTA Arad (Romanian I) (Romania)	Debrecen–Pallag
13:00 CET	Domingues 1'	Report	Zsóri 10'; Ghezali 15'	Stadium: DLA training pitch Attendance: 0 (closed doors); Referee: Ferenc Karakó
Note: DVSC: Pálfi — G. Kocsis, Lagator, Malinov, Ferenczi, Domingues, M. Szécsi, Youga, Szuhodovszki, Dzsudzsák, Bárány • Substitutions: Engedi, Hornyák, T. Szűcs, Drešković, Shedrach, Vajda, Tercza, Egri, Polozhy • Manager: Nestor El Maestro

Winter training camp in Spain, between 12–24 January 2025.

15 January 2025 Friendly	Partizan (Serbian I) (Serbia)	1–1	Debrecen	Antalya, Turkey
14:00 UTC+3	Natcho 41'	Report	Szuhodovszki 56'
Note: DVSC: Megyeri (Hegyi (substituted on) 46') — M. Szécsi (D. Kocsis (substituted on) 63'), Drešković, Hofmann, Vajda (Stojković (substituted on) 63'), Youga, Malinov (Ferenczi (substituted on) 46'), Domingues, Szuhodovszki, Dzsudzsák (T. Szűcs (substituted on) 46'), Bárány (Shedrach (substituted on) 63') • Manager: Nestor El Maestro

20 January 2025 Friendly	Struga (Macedonian I) (North Macedonia)	0–0	Debrecen	Manavgat, Turkey
14:00 UTC+3		Report		Stadium: Arslan Zeki Demirci Sports Complex
Note: DVSC 1st half: Hegyi — Vajda, Drešković, Lang, Ferenczi — Youga, T. Szűcs — D. Kocsis, Szuhodovszki, Dzsudzsák — Shedrach • DVSC 2nd half: Hegyi — Vajda, Hofmann, G. Kocsis, Ferenczi — Stojković, T. Szűcs (Polozhy (substituted on) 62') — D. Kocsis, Szuhodovszki (Đurasek (substituted on) 57'), Dzsudzsák (Egri (substituted on) 57') — M. Szécsi • Manager: Nestor El Maestro

24 January 2025 Friendly	Radnički 1923 (Serbian I) (Serbia)	2–1	Debrecen	Turkey
14:00 UTC+3	Bevis 68'; Baldé 89'	Report	Bárány 45'
Note: DVSC: Hegyi — Lang, Drešković (Bárány (substituted on) 38'), Hofmann (G. Kocsis (substituted on) 78') — M. Szécsi, Youga, Szuhodovszki (Vajda (substituted on) 63'), T. Szűcs, Ferenczi — Dzsudzsák (Đurasek (substituted on) 63'), D. Kocsis (Shedrach (substituted on) 78') • Manager: Nestor El Maestro

== Competitions ==
=== Overall record ===
The Last match and the Final position achieved in competition(s) that have not yet been completed are indicated in italics.

Competition	First match	Last match	Starting round	Final position	Record							
Competition	First match	Last match	Starting round	Final position	Pld	W	D	L	GF	GA	GD	Win %
Nemzeti Bajnokság I	2 August 2024	24 May 2025	Matchday 2	9th	33	9	7	17	52	59	−7	27.27
Magyar Kupa	14 September 2024	29 October 2024	Round of 64	Round of 32	2	1	0	1	4	1	+3	50.00
Total					35	10	7	18	56	60	−4	28.57

Last updated: 24 May 2025
Source: Soccerway

=== Nemzeti Bajnokság I ===
==== League table ====
Pos	Team	Pld	W	D	L	GF	GA	GD	Pts	Qualification or relegation
7	Újpest	33	9	14	10	38	44	−6	41	
8	Nyíregyháza	33	9	9	15	31	52	−21	36	
9	Debrecen	33	9	7	17	52	59	−7	34	
10	Zalaegerszeg	33	7	13	13	35	42	−7	34	
11	Fehérvár (R)	33	8	7	18	34	52	−18	31	Relegation to the Nemzeti Bajnokság II

Source: Hungarian Football Federation (in Hungarian)
Rules for classification: 1) Points; 2) Matches won; 3) Goal difference; 4) Goals scored; 5) Head-to-head points; 6) Head-to-head goal difference; 7) Fair play ranking; 8) Drawing of lots.
(R) Relegated

==== Results summary ====
Overall								Home						Away					
Pld	W	D	L	GF	GA	GD	Pts	W	D	L	GF	GA	GD	W	D	L	GF	GA	GD
33	9	7	17	52	59	−7	34	5	4	7	28	30	−2	4	3	10	24	29	−5

Last updated: 24 May 2025.
Source: Soccerway

==== Results by round ====
A = Away; H = Home; W = Win; D = Draw; L = Loss

Round	2	3	4	5	6	7	8	9	10	11	12	13	14	15	1^{1}	16	17	18	19	20	21	22	23	24	25	26	27	28	29	30	31	32	33
Ground	A	A	H	A	H	A	H	A	H	A	A	H	H	A	H	H	A	H	A	H	A	H	H	A	A	H	A	H	A	H	A	H	A
Result	W	D	L	L	W	L	L	L	L	L	D	D	D	L	W	L	L	W	W	L	L	L	L	D	W	W	L	W	L	D	L	D	W
Position	5	4	7	10	8	8	9	10	11	11	11	11	11	11	11	11	11	11	10	11	11	11	12	11	11	10	11	9	11	11	11	10	9
Points	3	4	4	4	7	7	7	7	7	7	8	9	10	10	13	13	13	16	19	19	19	19	19	20	23	26	26	29	29	30	30	31	34
Manager	B	B	B	B	D	M	M	M	M	M	D	D	E	E	E	E	E	E	E	E	E	E	E	E	E	E	E	E	E	E	E	E	E

Updated to match(es) played on 24 May 2025. Source:
Notes:
^{1} Round 1 match (Debrecen–Ferencváros) postponed to 4 December 2024.

Manager: • B Blagojević • D Dombi ^{caretaker} • M Máté • E El Maestro

==== Matches ====
Win Draw Loss Postponed

2 August 2024 2	Győr	0–3	Debrecen	Győr
18:50 CEST		Report	Lagator (yellow card) 47'; Domingues 55'; Bárány 60'; Silue 85'	Stadium: ETO Park; Attendance: 5,138; Referee: Tamás Bognár; Assistant referees: D. Szalai, D. Rózsa
Note: Debrecen: Megyeri — Stojković, Lagator, Pëllumbi, Ferenczi — Ojediran, T. Szűcs — Vajda (Szécsi (substituted on) 71'), Dzsudzsák (c) (Drešković (substituted on) 77'), Domingues (Shaghoyan (substituted on) 86') — Bárány (Silue (substituted on) 77') • Manager: Srđan Blagojević

9 August 2024 3	Kecskemét	1–1	Debrecen	Kecskemét
18:50 CEST	Katona (yellow card) 30'; A. Szabó (yellow card) 44'; Vágó 45+3' (yellow card) 50'	Report	Domingues 19'; Szuhodovszki (yellow card) 47'; Dzsudzsák (yellow card) 50'; Ferenczi (red card) 62'; T. Szűcs (yellow card) 90+4'	Stadium: Széktói Stadion; Attendance: 3,835; Referee: Bence Csonka; Assistant referees: D. Szalai, B. Belicza
Note: Debrecen: Megyeri — Stojković, Drešković, Pëllumbi, Ferenczi – Lagator, Szuhodovszki (T. Szűcs (substituted on) 46') – Vajda (Szécsi (substituted on) 46'), Dzsudzsák (c) (Braga (substituted on) 63'), Domingues (Shaghoyan (substituted on) 90') – Bárány (Silue (substituted on) 76') • Manager: Srđan Blagojević

17 August 2024 4	Debrecen	0–1	Diósgyőr	Debrecen
17:00 CEST	Silue (yellow card) 24'; Szuhodovszki (yellow card) 28'; Pëllumbi (yellow card) 42' (yellow-red card) 45+1'; Lagator (yellow card) 74'; Dzsudzsák (yellow card) 90+9'	Report	Chorbadzhiyski 30'; Franchu (yellow card) 43'; Edomwonyi (yellow card) 51'; Chorbadzhiyski (yellow card) 60'; Lund (yellow card) 62'; Sentić (yellow card) 90+3'	Stadium: Nagyerdei Stadion; Attendance: 7,077; Referee: József Erdős; Assistant referees: Georgiou Theodoros, Gergő Vígh-Tarsonyi
Note: It was the 62nd "Eastern Derby" between the two teams. Debrecen won 39 matches, Diósgyőr won 12 and 11 ended in a draw. DVSC: Megyeri — Stojković, Drešković, Lagator, Pëllumbi — Szuhodovszki (Szécsi (substituted on) 67'), T. Szűcs — D. Kocsis (Braga (substituted on) 46'), Dzsudzsák (c) (Shaghoyan (substituted on) 84'), Domingues (Vajda (substituted on) 89') — Silue • Manager: Srđan Blagojević (yellow card) 90+8'

23 August 2024 5	Újpest	3–0	Debrecen	Budapest
20:00 CEST	Bese 20'; Ljujić 29'; Brodić 52' (pen.); Gergényi (yellow card) 80'	Report	Domingues (yellow card) 53'; Drešković (yellow card) 79'	Stadium: Szusza Ferenc Stadion; Attendance: 5,779; Referee: Mihály Káprály; Assistant referees: Gergely Becséri, Dávid Rózsa
Note: Debrecen: Megyeri — Stojković, Drešković, Lagator, Ferenczi — Braga (Szuhodovszki (substituted on) 55'), T. Szűcs — Domingues (D. Kocsis (substituted on) 84'), Dzsudzsák (c) (Szécsi (substituted on) 71'), Shaghoyan (Vajda (substituted on) 55') — Silue • Manager: Srđan Blagojević

31 August 2024 6	Debrecen	3–1	Zalaegerszeg	Debrecen
17:45 CEST	Dzsudzsák 54' (pen.); Szécsi (yellow card) 61'; Pëllumbi (yellow card) 63'; Ferenczi 65'; Domingues 90+6' (yellow card) 90+6'	Report	Dénes 5'; Sanković (yellow card) 21'; Safronov (yellow card) 52'; Szendrei (yellow card) 80'; Evangelou (yellow card) 87'	Stadium: Nagyerdei Stadion; Attendance: 5,072; Referee: Márton Rúsz; Assistant referees: Péter Garai, Zoltán Horváth
Note: Debrecen: Megyeri — Stojković, Batik, Pëllumbi, Ferenczi — Lagator, T. Szűcs (Braga (substituted on) 90') — Szuhodovszki (Shaghoyan (substituted on) 90'), Dzsudzsák (c), Szécsi (Domingues (substituted on) 86') — Bárány (Silue (substituted on) 81') • Interim manager: Tibor Dombi

21 September 2024 7	Nyíregyháza	3–2	Debrecen	Nyíregyháza
19:30 CEST	B. Nagy 23'; Toma (yellow card) 33'; Navrátil 36', 65'; Kovácsréti (yellow card) 47'; Keita (yellow card) 77'; Gresó (yellow card) 84'; Baki (yellow card) 90+2'	Report	Pëllumbi 8'; Drešković (yellow card) 61'; Dzsudzsák 79' (pen.); Silue (yellow card) 88'	Stadium: Városi Stadion; Attendance: 8,000; Referee: Balázs Berke; Assistant referees: Norbert Bornemissza, Péter Garai
Note: Debrecen: Megyeri — G. Kocsis (Stojković (substituted on) 63'), Drešković, Pëllumbi, Ferenczi (Silue (substituted on) 73') — Lagator (Đurasek (substituted on) 73'), Dzsudzsák (c) — D. Kocsis (Domingues (substituted on) 46'), T. Szűcs, Szécsi (Vajda (substituted on) 63') — Bárány • Manager: Csaba Máté

28 September 2024 8	Debrecen	2–3	MTK	Debrecen
19:30 CEST	Stojković (yellow card) 26'; D. Kocsis 41'; T. Szűcs 76'; Domingues (yellow card) 81'	Report	Jurina 33'; Kata (yellow card) 40'; Bognár 59'; Kádár (yellow card) 73'; Varju (red card); Hey 85'	Stadium: Nagyerdei Stadion; Attendance: 5,321; Referee: Csaba Pintér; Assistant referees: Péter Kóbor, Dávid Rózsa
Note: Debrecen: Megyeri — Stojković, Drešković, Lagator, Pëllumbi — D. Kocsis (Shaghoyan (substituted on) 74'), T. Szűcs, Dzsudzsák (c), Đurasek (Braga (substituted on) 15' (substituted off) 74' (Silue (substituted on) 74')), Vajda (Domingues (substituted on) 46') — Bárány • Manager: Csaba Máté

4 October 2024 9	Puskás Akadémia	1–0	Debrecen	Felcsút
20:00 CEST	Duarte (yellow card) 41'; Golla 89'; Colley (yellow card) 90+4'	Report	Lagator (yellow card) 33'; T. Szűcs (yellow card) 49'; Megyeri (yellow card) 75'	Stadium: Pancho Aréna; Attendance: 1,195; Referee: Márton Rúsz; Assistant referees: Gergő Vígh-Tarsonyi, Péter Garai
Note: Debrecen: Megyeri — Szécsi, G. Kocsis, Drešković, Pëllumbi (Shaghoyan (substituted on) 90+4'), Ferenczi — Lagator, T. Szűcs, Dzsudzsák (c) (Szuhodovszki (substituted on) 66') — Domingues (Vajda (substituted on) 76'), Silue (Bárány (substituted on) 66') • Manager: Csaba Máté; Player of the match: Wojciech Golla, Puskás Akadémia 8.5 • Best player of Debrecen: Meldin Drešković 7.9 (Source:)

19 October 2024 10	Debrecen	0–5	Paks	Debrecen
15:00 CEST	Domingues (yellow card) 38'; Lagator (yellow card) 73'; G. Kocsis (red card) 75'	Report	Vécsei 9'; B. Tóth 32'; Mezei (yellow card) 40' (goal) 41'; Silye (yellow card) 53'; K. Papp 65'; Ötvös 77' (pen.); Győrfi (yellow card) 86'; Kinyik (yellow card) 87'	Stadium: Nagyerdei Stadion; Attendance: 4,664; Referee: József Erdős; Assistant referees: Gergely Becséri, József Aradi
Note: Debrecen: Megyeri — Szécsi (Bárány (substituted on) 46', Batik, Drešković (G. Kocsis (substituted on) 46'), Ferenczi — Lagator, Szuhodovszki (Pëllumbi (substituted on) 46') — T. Szűcs (D. Kocsis (substituted on) 67'), Dzsudzsák (c), Domingues — Silue (Stojković (substituted on) 46') • Manager: Csaba Máté; Player of the match: Bálint Vécsei, Paks 8.9 • Best player of Debrecen: Balázs Megyeri 8.8 (Source:)

26 October 2024 11	Fehérvár	2–0	Debrecen	Székesfehérvár
17:15 CEST	Gradišar 37', 56' (yellow card) 67'; M. Kovács (yellow card) 90+2'	Report	Ferenczi (yellow card) 46'; Pëllumbi (yellow card) 77'; Batik (yellow card) 63' (yellow-red card) 83'; Szuhodovszki (yellow card) 90+1'	Stadium: Sóstói Stadion; Attendance: 3,418; Referee: Tamás Bognár; Assistant referees: Balázs Buzás, Péter Kóbor
Note: Debrecen: Megyeri — Stojković, Batik, Pëllumbi (Drešković (substituted on) 84'), Ferenczi (D. Kocsis (substituted on) 71') — Lagator, T. Szűcs — Szécsi (Kaye (substituted on) 63'), Dzsudzsák (c) (Szuhodovszki (substituted on) 63'), Domingues — Bárány (Silue (substituted on) 71') • Manager: Csaba Máté; Player of the match: Nejc Gradišar, Fehérvár 9.1 • Best player of Debrecen: Donát Bárány 7.1 (Source:)

3 November 2024 12	Ferencváros	2–2	Debrecen	Budapest
14:45 CET	Gartenmann (yellow card) 50'; Traoré 62'; Makreckis (yellow card) 83'; Gruber 85'	Report	T. Szűcs (yellow card) 57'; Bárány 72'; Drešković 80'; Lagator (yellow card) 90+1'	Stadium: Ferencváros Stadion; Attendance: 11,375; Referee: Gergő Bogár; Assistant referees: István Albert, Bence Belicza
Note: Debrecen: Megyeri — Stojković, Drešković, G. Kocsis, Ferenczi — T. Szűcs, Lagator — Szuhodovszki, Dzsudzsák (c) (Braga (substituted on) 90+2'), Domingues (Szécsi (substituted on) 77') — Bárány (Kaye (substituted on) 74') • Interim manager: Tibor Dombi; Player of the match: Meldin Drešković, Debrecen 8.9 (Source:)

10 November 2024 13	Debrecen	2–2	Győr	Debrecen
16:00 CET	Dzsudzsák (yellow card) 8'; Bárány 42'; Stojković 73'	Report	Bumba 9'; Boldor (yellow card) 40'; R. Tóth (yellow card) 59'; Heitor (yellow card) 62'; Marku (yellow card) 67'; Ouro (yellow card) 70'; Bitri 89'	Stadium: Nagyerdei Stadion; Attendance: 4,521; Referee: Ferenc Karakó; Assistant referees: Vencel Tóth II, Norbert Bornemissza
Note: Debrecen: Megyeri — Stojković, Batik (Braga (substituted on) 64'), Drešković, Ferenczi – Szuhodovszki (Vajda (substituted on) 86'), G. Kocsis – T. Szűcs, Dzsudzsák (c) (Szécsi (substituted on) 76'), Domingues – Bárány (Kaye (substituted on) 86') • Interim manager: Tibor Dombi; Player of the match: Eneo Bitri and Claudiu Bumba, Győr 7.7 each • Best player of Debrecen: Donát Bárány 7.5 (Source:)

24 November 2024 14	Debrecen	2–2	Kecskemét	Debrecen
17:45 CET	T. Szűcs (yellow card) 14'; Bárány 17'; Szuhodovszki 80'	Report	Belényesi (yellow card) 4'; Pálinkás 29'; Lukács 55'	Stadium: Nagyerdei Stadion; Attendance: 2,612; Referee: Tamás Bognár; Assistant referees: Balázs Huszár, Ákos Berényi
Note: Debrecen: Megyeri — Stojković (Vajda (substituted on) 73'), Drešković (Kaye (substituted on) 83'), G. Kocsis, Ferenczi (c) — Pëllumbi, Lagator, Shaghoyan (Szuhodovszki (substituted on) 60'), T. Szűcs (Dzsudzsák (substituted on) 60'), Domingues — Bárány • Manager: Nestor El Maestro; Player of the match: János Ferenczi, Debrecen 7.9 (Source:)

30 November 2024 15	Diósgyőr	3–1	Debrecen	Miskolc
16:30 CET	Klimovich 25'; D. Gera 44' (yellow card) 67'; Acolatse (yellow card) 70'; Rakonjac 84' (yellow card) 84'	Report	Drešković (yellow card) 18'; Domingues 62'; Lagator (yellow card) 69'; Szuhodovszki (yellow card) 73'	Stadium: Diósgyőri Stadion; Attendance: 5,518; Referee: Csaba Pintér; Assistant referees: Péter Kóbor, József Aradi
Note: Debrecen: Megyeri — Stojković (Szécsi (substituted on) 46'), Drešković, D. Kocsis, Ferenczi — Lagator, Pëllumbi (T. Szűcs (substituted on) 46') — Szuhodovszki (Kaye (substituted on) 79'), Dzsudzsák (c), Domingues — Bárány • Manager: Nestor El Maestro; Player of the match: Vladislav Klimovich, Elton Acolatse Diósgyőr and Balázs Dzsudzsák Debrecen 7.9 each (Source:)

5 December 2024 1	Debrecen	5–4	Ferencváros	Debrecen
20:00 CET	Bárány 2', 5', 17'; Domingues 49', 59'; Ferenczi (yellow card) 49'; Szuhodovszki (yellow card) 53'; Drešković (yellow card) 73'; Kaye (yellow card) 87'	Report	B. Varga 30' (pen.), 42' (yellow card) 45'; Szalai (yellow card) 4' (yellow-red card) 31'; Saldanha 47'; Cissé 82'; Kady (yellow card) 83'; Ben Romdhane (yellow card) 86'	Stadium: Nagyerdei Stadion; Attendance: 5,011; Referee: Bence Csonka; Assistant referees: Norbert Bornemissza, Balázs Szalai
Note: Debrecen: Megyeri — Ferenczi, Drešković, G. Kocsis (Pëllumbi (substituted on) 26'), Lagator — Szuhodovszki, Dzsudzsák (c), Domingues (Braga (substituted on) 90') — T. Szűcs, Bárány (Kaye (substituted on) 45+2'), Szécsi • Manager: Nestor El Maestro; Player of the match: Brandon Domingues, Debrecen 9.4 (Source:)

8 December 2024 16	Debrecen	1–2	Újpest	Debrecen
17:00 CET	Dzsudzsák (yellow card) 13'; Lagator (yellow card) 18'; Szécsi 53'; Domingues (red card) 57'; D. Kocsis (yellow card) 90+2'	Report	Brodić 13' (yellow card) 69'; Nunes (yellow card) 32'; Onovo (yellow card) 37'; Gergényi (yellow card) 60'; Lacoux 67'	Stadium: Nagyerdei Stadion; Attendance: 4,332; Referee: Gergő Bogár; Assistant referees: Vencel Tóth II, József Aradi
Note: Debrecen: Megyeri — Szécsi, Drešković, Pëllumbi, Ferenczi — Lagator, T. Szűcs (Shaghoyan (substituted on) 89') — Domingues, Dzsudzsák (c), Braga (D. Kocsis (substituted on) 46') — Bárány (Kaye (substituted on) 89') • Manager: Nestor El Maestro; Player of the match: Tom Lacoux, Újpest 8.0 • Best player of Debrecen: Balázs Megyeri 7.9 (Source:)

14 December 2024 17	Zalaegerszeg	2–1	Debrecen	Zalaegerszeg
14:30 CET	Mim 22' (yellow card) 23'; Várkonyi 81'; Bakti (yellow card) 83'	Report	Lagator (yellow card) 27' (yellow-red card) 79'; Drešković 63'; Dzsudzsák (yellow card) 63'; Szécsi (yellow card) 85'; Kaye (yellow card) 90+3'; Megyeri (yellow card) 90+5'	Stadium: ZTE Arena; Attendance: 1,623; Referee: Péter Antal; Assistant referees: Zoltán Horváth, Dávid Rózsa
Note: Debrecen: Megyeri — Szécsi, Drešković, Pëllumbi (Stojković (substituted on) 57'), Ferenczi — D. Kocsis (Shaghoyan (substituted on) 80'), Lagator, T. Szűcs (Braga (substituted on) 80') Szuhodovszki (Kaye (substituted on) 88') — Dzsudzsák (c), Bárány • Manager: Nestor El Maestro; Player of the match: Gergely Mim, Zalaegerszeg 7.7 • Best player of Debrecen: Meldin Drešković and Balázs Dzsudzsák 7.5 each (Source:)

2 February 2025 18	Debrecen	3–1	Nyíregyháza	Debrecen
12:45 CET	Bárány 8' (yellow card) 23'; Maurides 77', 90+1'; Hofmann (yellow card) 83'	Report	Maurides 12' (o.g.); Temesvári (yellow card) 72' (yellow-red card) 88'; A. Keita (yellow card) 76'; Jokić (yellow card) 80'; Toma (yellow card) 90'	Stadium: Nagyerdei Stadion; Attendance: 8,011; Referee: Gergő Bogár; Assistant referees: Zoltán Horváth, Ákos Berényi
Note: Debrecen: Hegyi — M. Szécsi, Lang, Hofmann, Ferenczi (c) (Vajda (substituted on) 68') — T. Szűcs (Malinov (substituted on) 75'), Youga, Szuhodovszki (Đurasek (substituted on) 75'), Domingues — Bárány (G. Kocsis (substituted on) 90+1'), Maurides • Manager: Nestor El Maestro; Player of the match: Maurides, Debrecen 9.0 (Source:)

7 February 2025 19	MTK	0–2	Debrecen	Budapest
20:00 CET	R. Molnár (yellow card) 47'; Bobál (yellow card) 62'; Á. Molnár (red card) 73'	Report	Vajda (yellow card) 17'; Domingues 29' (yellow card) 61'; T. Szűcs 69'	Stadium: Hidegkuti Nándor Stadion; Attendance: 2,389; Referee: István Vad II; Assistant referees: Péter Kóbor, Péter Garai
Note: Debrecen: Hegyi — Hofmann, Lang, Malinov, Vajda — M. Szécsi (c) (G. Kocsis (substituted on) 88'), Szuhodovszki (Đurasek (substituted on) 88'), Youga (T. Szűcs (substituted on) 55'), Domingues — Bárány, Maurides (Dzsudzsák (substituted on) 65') • Manager: Nestor El Maestro; Player of the match: Brandon Domingues, Debrecen 7.9 (Source:)

15 February 2025 20	Debrecen	1–2	Puskás Akadémia	Debrecen
19:30 CET	Hofmann (yellow card) 14'; Vajda 29'; Dzsudzsák (yellow card) 78'; Malinov (yellow card) 82'	Report	Kerezsi (yellow card) 16'; Zs. Nagy (yellow card) 26' (goal) 56' (pen.); Markgráf (yellow card) 36'; Colley (yellow card) 49'; Plšek 90+5'	Stadium: Nagyerdei Stadion; Attendance: 3,334; Referee: Márton Rúsz; Assistant referees: Georgiou Theodoros, Ákos Berényi
Note: Debrecen: Hegyi — M. Szécsi, Lang, Hofmann, Vajda — T. Szűcs (Stojković (substituted on) 85'), Szuhodovszki, Malinov — Đurasek (G. Kocsis (substituted on) 46') — Dzsudzsák (c) (Kaye (substituted on) 90+5'), Maurides (Bárány (substituted on) 67') • Manager: Nestor El Maestro; Player of the match: Jakub Plšek, Puskás Akadémia 7.8 • Best player of Debrecen: Maximilian Hofmann 7.7 (Source:)

22 February 2025 21	Paks	4–3	Debrecen	Paks
17:00 CET	K. Papp (yellow card) 26'; Ádám 34' (pen.); Silye 38'; Kinyik (yellow card) 70'; Könyves 75', 89'; Windecker (yellow card) 88'	Report	Malinov (yellow card) 10'; Hegyi (yellow card) 33'; Hofmann (yellow card) 46'; Bárány (yellow card) 55'; Domingues 64'; D. Kocsis (yellow card) 81'; Maurides 71', 90+5'	Stadium: Fehérvári úti Stadion; Attendance: 2,231; Referee: Tamás Bognár; Assistant referees: Vencel Tóth II, Dániel Szalai
Note: Debrecen: Hegyi — M. Szécsi (c) (Dzsudzsák (substituted on) 46'), Lang, Hofmann, Vajda — Castegren, Szuhodovszki (D. Kocsis (substituted on) 61'), Malinov — Domingues — Maurides, Bárány (Đurasek (substituted on) 77') • Manager: Nestor El Maestro; Player of the match: Maurides, Debrecen 9.6 (Source:)

2 March 2025 22	Debrecen	1–2	Fehérvár	Debrecen
14:00 CET	Vajda (yellow card) 51'; Domingues 59'; D. Kocsis (yellow card) 69'	Report	Šaponjić 8'; Bedi (yellow card) 34'; M. Katona 53'; A. Huszti (yellow card) 71'	Stadium: Nagyerdei Stadion; Attendance: 4,744; Referee: István Vad II; Assistant referees: István Szécsényi, Zoltán Horváth
Note: Debrecen: Hegyi — Castegren (M. Szécsi (substituted on) 80'), Lang, Hofmann, Vajda — Malinov (D. Kocsis (substituted on) 59'), Domingues — T. Szűcs (Đurasek (substituted on) 59'), Szuhodovszki (Bárány (substituted on) 46'), Dzsudzsák (c) — Maurides • Manager: Nestor El Maestro; Player of the match: Balázs Dzsudzsák, Debrecen 8.0 (Source:)

9 March 2025 23	Debrecen	0–1	Ferencváros	Debrecen
18:00 CET	Domingues (yellow card) 55'; Lang (yellow card) 90+2'	Report	Pešić 34'; A. Tóth (yellow card) 49'; Gartenmann (yellow card) 65'; Romão (yellow card) 78' (yellow-red card) 90+4'; Makreckis (yellow card) 89'	Stadium: Nagyerdei Stadion; Attendance: 10,634; Referee: Balázs Berke; Assistant referees: Vencel Tóth II, Bence Belicza
Note: Debrecen: Hegyi — M. Szécsi (Stojković (substituted on) 88'), Lang, Hofmann, Castegren (Vajda (substituted on) 59') – T. Szűcs (Szuhodovszki (substituted on) 76'), Youga, Malinov, Domingues – Dzsudzsák (c) (D. Kocsis (substituted on) 76'), Maurides • Manager: Nestor El Maestro; Player of the match: Stefan Gartenmann, Ferencváros 7.7 • Best player of Debrecen: Maurides, Krisztián Hegyi 7.4 each (Source:)

14 March 2025 24	Győr	0–0	Debrecen	Győr
18:00 CET	Anton (yellow card) 20'; R. Tóth (yellow card) 29'; Štefulj (yellow card) 44'; Marku (yellow card) 45'; Krpić (yellow card) 78'; Ouro (yellow card) 90'	Report	Malinov (yellow card) 18'; Dzsudzsák (yellow card) 66'; Youga (yellow card) 86'	Stadium: ETO Park; Attendance: 2,890; Referee: Márton Rúsz; Assistant referees: Gergő Vígh-Tarsonyi, Ákos Berényi
Note: Debrecen: Hegyi — M. Szécsi (c), Castegren, Lang, Hofmann, Vajda (D. Kocsis (substituted on) 81') — Youga, Malinov (T. Szűcs (substituted on) 62'), Domingues — Maurides, Bárány (Dzsudzsák (substituted on) 62') • Manager: Nestor El Maestro; Player of the match: Samuel Petráš, Győr 8.5 • Best player of Debrecen: Brandon Domingues 8.0 (Source:)

28 March 2025 25	Kecskemét	1–3	Debrecen	Kecskemét
20:00 CEST	Botka (yellow card) 30'; Pászka 27' (yellow card) 35'; L. Katona (yellow card) 43'; A. Szabó (yellow card) 77'; Camaj (yellow card) 83'	Report	M. Szécsi 7'; Vajda 21'; Malinov (yellow card) 43' (goal) 45+1'; Hofmann (yellow card) 69'	Stadium: Széktói Stadion; Attendance: 2,074; Referee: József Erdős; Assistant referees: Balázs Buzás, Bence Belicza
Note: Debrecen: Pálfi — M. Szécsi (c), Castegren, Lang, Hofmann, Vajda — Youga, Malinov (Đurasek (substituted on) 77'), Domingues (G. Kocsis (substituted on) 77') — Bárány (Dzsudzsák (substituted on) 85'), Maurides (Szuhodovszki (substituted on) 64') • Manager: Nestor El Maestro; Player of the match: Márk Szécsi, Debrecen 8.0 (Source:)

5 April 2025 26	Debrecen	4–1	Diósgyőr	Debrecen
19:30 CEST	Bárány 25', 52', 69' (pen.); Domingues 55' (yellow card) 70'	Report	Edomwonyi 17'; Holdampf (yellow card) 57'; Ke. Kállai (yellow card) 80'	Stadium: Nagyerdei Stadion; Attendance: 5,244; Referee: Tamás Bognár; Assistant referees: Péter Kóbor, István Szécsényi
Note: Debrecen: Pálfi — Castegren, Lang, Hofmann (G. Kocsis (substituted on) 73') — M. Szécsi (c), Youga, Malinov (Đurasek (substituted on) 84'), Szuhodovszki (T. Szűcs (substituted on) 65'), B. Vajda — Domingues (Dzsudzsák (substituted on) 84'), Bárány (Maurides (substituted on) 73') • Manager: Nestor El Maestro; Player of the match: Donát Bárány, Debrecen 9.8 (Source:)

13 April 2025 27	Újpest	2–1	Debrecen	Budapest
14:00 CEST	Brodić (yellow card) 20'; Beridze 48'; Rasak 57'; Gergényi (yellow card) 90+1'	Report	Youga (yellow card) 11'; Bárány 64'	Stadium: Szusza Ferenc Stadion; Attendance: 5,502; Referee: Márton Rúsz; Assistant referees: Péter Garai, Dávid Rózsa
Note: Debrecen: Pálfi — Castegren (D. Kocsis (substituted on) 75'), Lang, Hofmann — M. Szécsi (c), Szuhodovszki (Maurides (substituted on) 46'), Youga, T. Szűcs (Đurasek (substituted on) 46' (substituted off) 53' (Dzsudzsák (substituted on) 53')), B. Vajda — Bárány, Domingues • Manager: Nestor El Maestro; Player of the match: Damian Rasak, Újpest 8.3 • Best player of Debrecen: Amos Youga 7.3 (Source:)

19 April 2025 28	Debrecen	4–3	Zalaegerszeg	Debrecen
13:15 CEST	Bárány 6'; T. Szűcs 52'; Domingues (yellow card) 54' (goal) 88', 90+6'; Lang (yellow card) 63'; T. Szűcs (yellow card) 74'	Report	Csonka (yellow card) 22'; Mim 25'; Krajcsovics 29'; Ipalibo 81'; Gundel-Takács (yellow card) 90+4'	Stadium: Nagyerdei Stadion; Attendance: 5,712; Referee: Péter Zierkelbach; Assistant referees: Georgiou Theodoros, Zoltán Horváth
Note: Debrecen: Gonda — M. Szécsi (c) (Szuhodovszki (substituted on) 39'), Castegren, Lang, Hofmann — T. Szűcs (Dzsudzsák (substituted on) 84'), Youga — Maurides, Bárány, Domingues (G. Kocsis (substituted on) 90+7') • Manager: Nestor El Maestro; Player of the match: Brandon Domingues, Debrecen 8.6 (Source:)

25 April 2025 29	Nyíregyháza	1–0	Debrecen	Nyíregyháza
20:00 CEST	Eppel 55' (pen.); Alaxai (yellow card) 80'; B. Tóth (yellow card) 88'; Keita (yellow card) 90+7'	Report	M. Szécsi (yellow card) 34'; Szuhodovszki (yellow card) 43'; Gonda (yellow card) 54'; Hofmann (red card) 88'; Malinov (yellow card) 90+3'; Maurides (yellow card) 90+7'; Youga (yellow card) 90+10'	Stadium: Városi Stadion; Attendance: 8,246; Referee: Tamás Bognár; Assistant referees: Péter Kóbor, Gergely Becséri
Note: Debrecen: Gonda — M. Szécsi (c) (Malinov (substituted on) 61'), Castegren, Lang, Hofmann, Vajda (Ferenczi (substituted on) 76') — Szuhodovszki (Dzsudzsák (substituted on) 67'), Youga, Domingues — Maurides, Bárány • Manager: Nestor El Maestro; Player of the match: Darko Velkovski, Nyíregyháza 8.0 • Best player of Debrecen: Maurides 7.1 (Source:)

3 May 2025 30	Debrecen	0–0	MTK	Debrecen
15:30 CEST	D. Kocsis (yellow card) 90'	Report	I. Bognár (penalty missed) 60'; P. Kovács I (yellow card) 62'; Kádár (yellow card) 87'; Németh (yellow card) 90'; Végh (yellow card) 90+4'	Stadium: Nagyerdei Stadion; Attendance: 6,534; Referee: Márton Rúsz; Assistant referees: István Albert, Bence Belicza
Note: Debrecen: Gonda — M. Szécsi (c), Castegren, Lang, G. Kocsis (Szuhodovszki (substituted on) 62'), Vajda (Ferenczi (substituted on) 62') — Dzsudzsák (D. Kocsis (substituted on) 70'), Youga, T. Szűcs (Stojković (substituted on) 89'), Domingues — Maurides • Manager: Nestor El Maestro; Player of the match: Bence Végh, MTK 8.1 • Best player of Debrecen: Tamás Szűcs 7.9 (Source:)

10 May 2025 31	Puskás Akadémia	4–2	Debrecen	Felcsút
14:30 CEST	Levi 10', 89'; Colley (yellow card) 18'; Zs. Nagy 37'; Duarte (yellow card) 52'; Mondovics (yellow card) 90+6' (goal) 90+8'	Report	Szűcs (yellow card) 45'; Hofmann (yellow card) 51'; M. Szécsi (yellow card) 66'; Youga 78'; Kaye 90'; Dzsudzsák (yellow card) 90'	Stadium: Pancho Aréna; Attendance: 2,500; Referee: Péter Antal; Assistant referees: Vencel Tóth II, Gergő Vígh-Tarsonyi
Note: Debrecen: Gonda — M. Szécsi (c) (D. Kocsis (substituted on) 75'), G. Kocsis, Lang, Hofmann, Vajda (Ferenczi (substituted on) 46') — Malinov (Dzsudzsák (substituted on) 66'), T. Szűcs (Szuhodovszki (substituted on) 46'), Youga — Maurides (Kaye (substituted on) 75'), Domingues • Manager: Nestor El Maestro; Player of the match: Jonathan Levi, Puskás Akadémia 8.8 • Best player of Debrecen: Amos Youga 7.6 (Source:)

18 May 2025 32	Debrecen	0–0	Paks	Debrecen
16:45 CEST	Lang (yellow card) 80'	Report	Windecker (yellow card) 35'; Ötvös (yellow card) 38'; Szappanos (red card) 72'; Silye (yellow card) 77'	Stadium: Nagyerdei Stadion; Attendance: 8,064; Referee: Balázs Berke; Assistant referees: István Albert, Balázs Buzás
Note: Debrecen: Pálfi — Castegren, Lang, G. Kocsis, Ferenczi (c) — M. Szécsi, Youga (Maurides (substituted on) 82'), T. Szűcs, Szuhodovszki (Dzsudzsák (substituted on) 68'), Domingues (Vajda (substituted on) 55') — Bárány • Manager: Nestor El Maestro; Player of the match: Gábor Vas, Paks 7.6 • Best player of Debrecen: Tamás Szűcs and Donát Pálfi 7.5 each (Source:)

24 May 2025 33	Fehérvár	0–3	Debrecen	Székesfehérvár
17:30 CEST	Bedi (yellow card) 36'; Melnyk (yellow card) 45+1'; Šaponjić (yellow card) 61'; Kastrati (red card) 70'	Report	Szuhodovszki 21'; G. Kocsis 66'; Domingues (yellow card) 70'; Youga (red card) 70'; T. Szűcs (yellow card) 72'; Maurides 85'	Stadium: Sóstói Stadion; Attendance: 9,160; Referee: Gergő Bogár; Assistant referees: Balázs Szert, Georgiou Theodoros
Note: Debrecen: Pálfi — M. Szécsi, Lang, Hofmann, Ferenczi (c) — Youga, G. Kocsis (Stojković (substituted on) 88') — T. Szűcs (Castegren (substituted on) 79'), Szuhodovszki (Dzsudzsák (substituted on) 88'), Domingues (Vajda (substituted on) 72') — Bárány (Maurides (substituted on) 79') • Manager: Nestor El Maestro; Player of the match: Maximilian Hofmann, Debrecen 8.0 (Source:)

==== Results overview ====
All results are indicated from the perspective of Debreceni VSC.
The round number is indicated in parentheses.
Win Draw Loss Postponed

Opposition	Round 1–22		Round 23–33		Double	Points
Opposition	Home score	Away score	Home score	Away score	Double	Points
Diósgyőr	0–1 (4)	1–3 (15)	4–1 (26)		5–5	3
Fehérvár	1–2 (22)	0–2 (11)		3–0 (33)	4–4	3
Ferencváros	5–4 (1)	2–2 (12)	0–1 (23)		7–7	4
Győr	2–2 (13)	3–0 (2)		0–0 (24)	5–2	5
Kecskemét	2–2 (14)	1–1 (3)		3–1 (25)	6–4	5
MTK	2–3 (8)	2–0 (19)	0–0 (30)		4–3	4
Nyíregyháza	3–1 (18)	2–3 (7)		0–1 (29)	5–5	3
Paks	0–5 (10)	3–4 (21)	0–0 (32)		3–9	1
Puskás Akadémia	1–2 (20)	0–1 (9)		2–4 (31)	3–7	0
Újpest	1–2 (16)	0–3 (5)		1–2 (27)	2–7	0
Zalaegerszeg	3–1 (6)	1–2 (17)	4–3 (28)		8–6	6

=== Magyar Kupa ===
==== Round of 64 ====
The draw for the Round of 64 was held on 26 August 2024. Békéscsaba also started the Magyar Kupa competitions in this round.

14 September 2024 R64	Békéscsaba (NB II)	0–4	Debrecen	Békéscsaba
19:00 CEST	I. Szatmári (yellow card) 25'; M. Tóth (yellow card) 60'; Mikló (yellow card) 73'	Report	Bárány 10', 57', 64' (pen.); Lagator (yellow card) 24'; Dzsudzsák 26'	Stadium: Kórház utcai Stadion; Attendance: 1,650; Referee: Gergő Bogár; Assistant referees: Péter Garai, Ákos Berényi
Note: DVSC: Megyeri — G. Kocsis, Drešković (Stojković (substituted on) 80'), Pëllumbi, Ferenczi — Lagator (Braga (substituted on) 67'), Dzsudzsák (c) (Đurasek (substituted on) 77') — D. Kocsis (Szuhodovszki (substituted on) 67'), T. Szűcs, Szécsi — Bárány (Silue (substituted on) 77') • Coach: Csaba Máté

==== Round of 32 ====
The draw for the Round of 64 was held on 16 September 2024. In the draw Debrecen got Mezőkövesd as their opponent, who play in NB II. Mezőkövesd also started the Magyar Kupa competitions in Round of 64, they matched Csákvár (NB II) at home and the result was 3–1.

29 October 2024 R32	Mezőkövesd (NB II)	1–0	Debrecen	Mezőkövesd
18:00 CET	Kállai (yellow card) 59'; Varjas (yellow card) 64'; Bartusz 79' (pen.)	Report	T. Szűcs (yellow card) 74'; Silue (yellow card) 87'	Stadium: Városi Stadion; Attendance: 1,800; Referee: Péter Zierkelbach; Assistant referees: Balázs Szert, Norbert Bornemissza
Note: DVSC: Megyeri — Stojković (Shaghoyan (substituted on) 83'), Batik, Lagator, Ferenczi — Szuhodovszki (Silue (substituted on) 83'), T. Szűcs — Szécsi, Dzsudzsák (c), Domingues (B. Vajda (substituted on) 69') – Bárány • Interim coach: Tibor Dombi

== Squad statistics ==
As of match played 28 March 2025

Keys
Rk.	Rank	No.	Squad number	Pos.	Position
Opponent	The opponent team without a flag is Hungarian.			(N)	The game was played at a neutral site.
(H)	Debreceni VSC were the home team.			(A)	Debreceni VSC were the away team.
Player	Young Hungarian Player, who is a Hungarian player and was born 2004 or after				
Player^{*}	Player who joined Debreceni VSC on loan during the season				
Player^{⊕}	Player who joined Debreceni VSC permanently during the season				
Player^{†}	Player who departed Debreceni VSC permanently or on loan during the season				
Player^{#}	Player who playing parallel in the Debreceni VSC's second team (DVSC II on the Tier 3, NB III) and in the Debreceni VSC's cooperated team (Mezőkövesd on the Tier 2, NB II)				

=== Appearances ===
Includes all competitions for senior teams.
The number of the player's appearances as substitute is indicated by the combination of a plus sign and a figure.
The gold color indicates the maximum appearances only in the competition in which the team has already played at least 2 matches.

No.	Pos.	Nat.	Player	Nemzeti Bajnokság I	Magyar Kupa	Season total	Ref.
Goalkeepers
16	GK	(Hungary)	Balázs Megyeri	17	2	19	
47	GK	(Hungary)	Krisztián Hegyi^{*⊕}	7	0	7	
57	GK	(Japan)	Shūichi Gonda^{⊕}	0	0	0	
86	GK	(Hungary)	Donát Pálfi	1	0	1	
Defenders
4	DF	(Albania)	Jorgo Pëllumbi	12+2	1	13+2	
5	DF	(Hungary)	Bence Batik	4	1	5	
11	DF	(Hungary)	János Ferenczi	16	2	18	
15	DF	(Sweden)	Henrik Castegren^{⊕}	5	0	5	
26	DF	(Hungary)	Ádám Lang^{⊕}	8	0	8	
27	DF	(Hungary)	Gergő Kocsis^{⊕}	6+5	1	7+5	
28	DF	(Austria)	Maximilian Hofmann^{⊕}	8	0	8	
29	DF	(Hungary)	Erik Kusnyír	0	0	0	
30	DF	(Serbia)	Aranđel Stojković	11+5	1+1	12+6	
Midfielders
6	MF	(Croatia)	Neven Đurasek	2+6	0+1	2+7	
10	MF	(Hungary)	Balázs Dzsudzsák (c)	19+5	2	21+5	
13	MF	(Hungary)	Soma Szuhodovszki	14+6	1+1	15+7	
20	MF	(Central African Republic)	Amos Youga^{⊕}	5	0	5	
21	MF	(Hungary)	Dominik Kocsis	5+8	1	6+8	
22	MF	(Hungary)	Botond Vajda	9+8	0+1	9+9	
33	MF	(Bulgaria)	Kristiyan Malinov^{⊕}	7+1	0	7+1	
76	MF	(Hungary)	Iván Polozhyi^{#}	0	0	0	
99	MF	(France)	Brandon Domingues	20+3	1	21+3	
Forwards
8	FW	(Hungary)	Tamás Szűcs	19+4	2	21+4	
17	FW	(Hungary)	Donát Bárány	19+3	2	21+3	
18	FW	(Nigeria)	Shedrach Kaye	0+9	0	0+9	
25	FW	(Brazil)	Maurides^{*⊕}	8	0	8	
42	FW	(Ivory Coast)	Yacouba Silue	4+6	0+2	4+8	
74	FW	(Hungary)	Máté Kohut^{#}	0	0	0	
77	FW	(Hungary)	Márk Szécsi	15+8	2	17+8	
Players who departed the club on loan but featured this season
Players who left the club during the season
(3)	DF	(Hungary)	Csaba Hornyák^{†}	0	0	0	
(14)	DF	(Montenegro)	Meldin Drešković^{†}	14+2	1	15+2	
(15)	DF	(Spain)	Christian Manrique^{†}	0	0	0	
(18)	MF	(Nigeria)	Hamzat Ojediran^{†}	1	0	1	
(19)	FW	(Iceland)	Thorleifur Úlfarsson^{†}	0	0	0	
(23)	MF	(Armenia)	Zhirayr Shaghoyan^{†}	2+8	0+1	2+9	
(24)	FW	(Japan)	Naoaki Senaga^{†}	0	0	0	
(26)	MF	(Brazil)	Victor Braga^{†}	2+8	0+1	2+9	
(84)	GK	(Hungary)	Márk Engedi^{†}	0	0	0	
(89)	MF	(Greece)	Alexandros Kyziridis^{†}	0	0	0	
(94)	DF	(Montenegro)	Dušan Lagator^{†}	16	2	18	
	MF	(Hungary)	Flórián Cibla^{#†}	0	0	0	

Notes: Injury player; GK: goalkeeper; DF: defender; MF: midfielder; FW: forward

=== Goal scorers ===
Includes all competitions for senior teams. The list is sorted by the squad number when the season-total goals are equal. Players with no goals are not included in the list.
How many of the goals scored by the player from penalties is indicated in parentheses.

Rk.	No.	Pos.	Nat.	Player	Nemzeti Bajnokság I	Magyar Kupa	Season total
1	17	FW	(Hungary)	Donát Bárány	8	3 (1)	11 (1)
2	99	MF	(France)	Brandon Domingues	9	0	9
3	25	FW	(Brazil)	Maurides^{*⊕}	4	0	4
4	10	MF	(Hungary)	Balázs Dzsudzsák	2 (2)	1	3 (2)
5	8	FW	(Hungary)	Tamás Szűcs	2	0	2
5	(14)	DF	(Montenegro)	Meldin Drešković^{†}	2	0	2
5	22	MF	(Hungary)	Botond Vajda	2	0	2
5	77	FW	(Hungary)	Márk Szécsi	2	0	2
6	4	DF	(Albania)	Jorgo Pëllumbi	1	0	1
6	11	DF	(Hungary)	János Ferenczi	1	0	1
6	13	MF	(Hungary)	Soma Szuhodovszki	1	0	1
6	21	MF	(Hungary)	Dominik Kocsis	1	0	1
6	30	DF	(Serbia)	Aranđel Stojković	1	0	1
6	33	MF	(Bulgaria)	Kristiyan Malinov	1	0	1
6	42	FW	(Ivory Coast)	Yacouba Silue	1	0	1
				Opponent Own goal	0	0	0
Total					38 (2)	4 (1)	42 (3)

=== Penalties ===
Date	Penalty Taker	Scored	Opponent	Competition
31 August 2024	(Hungary) Balázs Dzsudzsák	Yes	Zalaegerszeg (H)	Nemzeti Bajnokság I, Round 6
14 September 2024	(Hungary) Donát Bárány	Yes	Békéscsaba (A)	Magyar Kupa, Round of 64
21 September 2024	(Hungary) Balázs Dzsudzsák	Yes	Nyíregyháza (A)	Nemzeti Bajnokság I, Round 7
5 April 2025	(Hungary) Donát Bárány	Yes	Diósgyőr (H)	Nemzeti Bajnokság I, Round 26
10 May 2025	(France) Brandon Domingues	No	Puskás Akadémia (A)	Nemzeti Bajnokság I, Round 31

=== Own goals ===
Pos.	Nat.	Player	Minute	Score	Result	Opponent	Competition	Date
FW	(Brazil)	Maurides^{*}	12	1–1	3–1	Nyíregyháza (H)	Nemzeti Bajnokság I, Round 18	2 February 2025

=== Hat-tricks ===
Key
Score	The score is at the time of the goals.		
(H)	Debrecen were the home team.	(A)	Debrecen were the away team.

Pos.	Nat.	Player	Minutes	Score	Result	Opponent	Competition	Date
FW	(Hungary)	Donát Bárány	10', 57', 64'	1–0, 3–0, 4–0	4–0 (A)	Békéscsaba	Magyar Kupa, Round of 64	14 September 2024
FW	(Hungary)	Donát Bárány	2', 5', 17'	1–0, 2–0, 3–0	5–4 (H)	Ferencváros	Nemzeti Bajnokság I, Round 1	5 December 2024

=== Goalkeepers ===
==== Clean sheets ====
Includes all competitions for senior teams. The list is sorted by the squad number when the season-total clean sheets are equal. The numbers in parentheses represent games where both goalkeepers participated and both kept a clean sheet; the number in parentheses is awarded to the goalkeeper who was substituted on, whilst a full clean sheet is awarded to the goalkeeper who was on the field at the start of play.
How many of the goals scored from penalties is indicated in parentheses.

Goalkeeper							Clean sheets			Ref.
Rk.	No.	Nat.	Goalkeeper	Games Played	Goals Conceded	Goals Against Average	Nemzeti Bajnokság I	Magyar Kupa	Season total	Ref.
1	16	(Hungary)	Balázs Megyeri	19	38 (4)	2.00	1	1	2	
1	47	(Hungary)	Krisztián Hegyi^{*⊕}	7	10 (2)	1.43	2	0	2	
3	86	(Hungary)	Donát Pálfi	5	4	0.80	2	0	2	
4	57	(Japan)	Shūichi Gonda^{⊕}	4	8 (1)	2.00	1	0	1	
Total					60 (7)		6	1	7	

==== Penalties saving ====
Date	Goalkeeper	Penalty Kick Save	Penalty Taker	Opponent	Competition	Min.
23 August 2024	Balázs Megyeri	No	Fran Brodić	Újpest	Nemzeti Bajnokság I, Round 5	(penalty scored) 52'
19 October 2024	Balázs Megyeri	No	Bence Ötvös	Paks	Nemzeti Bajnokság I, Round 10	(penalty scored) 77'
29 October 2024	Balázs Megyeri	No	Dániel Bartusz	Mezőkövesd	Magyar Kupa, Round of 32	(penalty scored) 79'
5 December 2024	Balázs Megyeri	No	Barnabás Varga	Ferencváros	Nemzeti Bajnokság I, Round 1	(penalty scored) 30'
15 February 2025	Krisztián Hegyi^{*⊕}	No	Zsolt Nagy	Puskás Akadémia	Nemzeti Bajnokság I, Round 20	(penalty scored) 56'
22 February 2025	Krisztián Hegyi^{*⊕}	No	Martin Ádám	Paks	Nemzeti Bajnokság I, Round 21	(penalty scored) 34'
25 April 2025	Shūichi Gonda^{⊕}	No	Márton Eppel	Nyíregyháza	Nemzeti Bajnokság I, Round 29	(penalty scored) 55'
3 May 2025	Shūichi Gonda^{⊕}	Yes	István Bognár	MTK	Nemzeti Bajnokság I, Round 30	(penalty missed) 60'

=== Disciplinary record ===
Includes all competitions for senior teams. The list is sorted by red cards, then yellow cards (and by squad number when total cards are equal). Players with no cards not included in the list.

Rk.	No.	Pos.	Nat.	Player	Nemzeti Bajnokság I				Magyar Kupa				Season total			
Rk.	No.	Pos.	Nat.	Player	Yellow card	Second yellow card	Red card	MM	Yellow card	Second yellow card	Red card	MM	Yellow card	Second yellow card	Red card	MM
1	(94)	DF	(Montenegro)	Dušan Lagator^{†}	7	0	1	2	1	0	0	0	8	0	1	2
2	99	MF	(France)	Brandon Domingues	6	0	1	2	0	0	0	0	6	0	1	2
3	4	DF	(Albania)	Jorgo Pëllumbi	2	1	0	1	0	0	0	0	2	1	0	1
3	11	DF	(Hungary)	János Ferenczi	2	0	1	1	0	0	0	0	2	0	1	1
4	5	DF	(Hungary)	Bence Batik	0	1	0	1	0	0	0	0	0	1	0	1
4	27	DF	(Hungary)	Gergő Kocsis^{⊕}	0	0	1	1	0	0	0	0	0	0	1	1
5	10	MF	(Hungary)	Balázs Dzsudzsák	7	0	0	1	0	0	0	0	7	0	0	1
6	8	FW	(Hungary)	Tamás Szűcs	4	0	0	0	1	0	0	0	5	0	0	0
6	13	MF	(Hungary)	Soma Szuhodovszki	5	0	0	1	0	0	0	0	5	0	0	1
7	(14)	DF	(Montenegro)	Meldin Drešković^{†}	4	0	0	0	0	0	0	0	4	0	0	0
7	28	DF	(Austria)	Maximilian Hofmann^{⊕}	4	0	0	0	0	0	0	0	4	0	0	0
7	33	MF	(Bulgaria)	Kristiyan Malinov^{⊕}	4	0	0	0	0	0	0	0	4	0	0	0
8	21	MF	(Hungary)	Dominik Kocsis	3	0	0	0	0	0	0	0	3	0	0	0
8	42	FW	(Ivory Coast)	Yacouba Silue	2	0	0	0	1	0	0	0	3	0	0	0
9	16	GK	(Hungary)	Balázs Megyeri	2	0	0	0	0	0	0	0	2	0	0	0
9	17	FW	(Hungary)	Donát Bárány	2	0	0	0	0	0	0	0	2	0	0	0
9	18	FW	(Nigeria)	Shedrach Kaye	2	0	0	0	0	0	0	0	2	0	0	0
9	22	MF	(Hungary)	Botond Vajda	2	0	0	0	0	0	0	0	2	0	0	0
9	77	FW	(Hungary)	Márk Szécsi	2	0	0	0	0	0	0	0	2	0	0	0
10	20	MF	(Central African Republic)	Amos Youga^{⊕}	1	0	0	0	0	0	0	0	1	0	0	0
10	26	DF	(Hungary)	Ádám Lang^{⊕}	1	0	0	0	0	0	0	0	1	0	0	0
10	30	DF	(Serbia)	Aranđel Stojković	1	0	0	0	0	0	0	0	1	0	0	0
10	47	GK	(Hungary)	Krisztián Hegyi^{*⊕}	1	0	0	0	0	0	0	0	1	0	0	0
Total					64	2	4	10	3	0	0	0	67	2	4	10

=== Suspensions ===
Player	Date Received	Opponent	Competition	Length of suspension			
(Hungary) János Ferenczi	9 August 2024	(red card) 62' vs Kecskemét (A)	NB I, Round 3	1 Match	Diósgyőr (H)	NB I, Round 4	17 August 2024
(Albania) Jorgo Pëllumbi	17 August 2024	(yellow card) 42' (yellow-red card) 45+1' vs Diósgyőr (H)	NB I, Round 4	1 Match	Újpest (A)	NB I, Round 5	23 August 2024
(Hungary) Gergő Kocsis^{⊕}	19 October 2024	(red card) 75' vs Paks (H)	NB I, Round 10	1 Match	Fehérvár (A)	NB I, Round 11	26 October 2024
(Hungary) Bence Batik	26 October 2024	(yellow card) 63' (yellow-red card) 83' vs Fehérvár (A)	NB I, Round 11	1 Match	Ferencváros (A)	NB I, Round 12	3 November 2024
(Montenegro) Dušan Lagator	3 November 2024	5th (yellow card) vs Ferencváros (A)	NB I, Round 12	1 Match	Győr (H)	NB I, Round 13	10 November 2024
(Hungary) Soma Szuhodovszki	5 December 2024	5th (yellow card) vs Ferencváros (H)	NB I, Round 1	1 Match	Újpest (H)	NB I, Round 16	8 December 2024
(France) Brandon Domingues	5 December 2024	(red card) 57' vs Újpest (H)	NB I, Round 16	1 Match	Zalaegerszeg (A)	NB I, Round 17	14 December 2024
(Montenegro) Dušan Lagator	14 December 2024	(yellow card) 29' (yellow-red card) 80' vs Zalaegerszeg (A)	NB I, Round 17	1 Match	Nyíregyháza (H)	NB I, Round 18	2 February 2025
(Hungary) Balázs Dzsudzsák	14 December 2024	5th (yellow card) vs Zalaegerszeg (A)	NB I, Round 17	1 Match	Nyíregyháza (H)	NB I, Round 18	2 February 2025
(France) Brandon Domingues	7 February 2025	5th (yellow card) vs MTK (A)	NB I, Round 19	1 Match	Puskás Akadémia (H)	NB I, Round 20	15 February 202
(Austria) Maximilian Hofmann	25 April 2025	(red card) 88' vs Nyíregyháza (A)	NB I, Round 29	1 Match	MTK (H)	NB I, Round 30	3 May 2025
(Central African Republic) Amos Youga	24 May 2025	(red card) 70' vs Fehérvár (A)	NB I, Round 33	2 Matches	TBD (First 2 matches of the 2025–26 season)		

=== Injuries ===
Player	Last game before suffering an injury			First game after recovering from an injury			Games missed	Ref.
Player	Date	Competition	Opponent	Date	Competition	Opponent	Games missed	Ref.
(Hungary) Bence Batik	Pre-season			17 August 2024	NB I, Round 4	Diósgyőr (H)	2	List
(Hungary) Erik Kusnyír	Pre-season			TBD			30	List
(Iceland) Thorleifur Úlfarsson	Pre-season			14 February 2025	Mutual agreement		21	List
(Croatia) Neven Đurasek	29 July 2024	Friendly	Karcag (H) (NB III)	31 August 2024	NB I, Round 6	Zalaegerszeg (H)	4	List
(Hungary) Donát Bárány	18 August 2024	After NB I, Round 4	Diósgyőr (H)	31 August 2024	NB I, Round 6	Zalaegerszeg (H)	1	
(Hungary) Bence Batik	1 September 2024	Nemzeti Bajnokság I	Training after NB I, Round 6	19 October 2024	NB I, Round 10	Paks (H)	5	List
(Croatia) Neven Đurasek	28 September 2024	NB I, Round 8	(substituted off) 15' MTK (H)	15 February 2025	NB I, Round 20	Puskás Akadémia (H)	11	List
(Albania) Jorgo Pëllumbi	26 October 2024	after NB I, Round 11	Fehérvár (A)	24 November 2024	NB I, Round 14	Kecskemét (H)	3	List
(Hungary) Bence Batik	10 November 2024	NB I, Round 13	(substituted off) 64' Győr (H)	TBD			16	List
(Ivory Coast) Yacouba Silue	19 November 2024	after Friendly match	Mezőkövesd (H)	TBD			16	List
(Hungary) Gergő Kocsis^{⊕}	5 December 2024	NB I, Round 1	(substituted off) 26' Ferencváros (H)	2 February 2025	NB I, Round 18	Nyíregyháza (H)	2	List
(Hungary) Donát Bárány	5 December 2024	NB I, Round 1	(substituted off) 45+2' Ferencváros (H)	8 December 2024	NB I, Round 16	Újpest (H)	0	List
(Hungary) János Ferenczi	2 February 2025	NB I, Round 18	(substituted off) 68' Nyíregyháza (H)	TBD			10	List
(Central African Republic) Amos Youga^{⊕}	7 February 2025	NB I, Round 19	(substituted off) 55' MTK (A)	9 March 2025	NB I, Round 23	Ferencváros (H)	3	List
(Hungary) Tamás Szűcs	14 March 2025	after NB I, Round 24	Győr (A)	TBD			1	List
(Hungary) Krisztián Hegyi^{⊕}	19 March 2025	During the national team's training session		TBD			4	List
(Bulgaria) Kristiyan Malinov	5 April 2025	after NB I, Round 26	Diósgyőr (H)	TBD			2	List
(Croatia) Neven Đurasek	13 April 2025	(substituted off) 53' NB I, Round 27	Újpest (A)	TBD			1	List

=== Captains ===
Includes all competitions for senior teams. The list is sorted by squad number when season-total number of games where a player started as captain are equal. Players with no games started as captain not included in the list.

Rk.	No.	Pos.	Nat.	Player	Nemzeti Bajnokság I	Magyar Kupa	Season total
1	10	MF	(Hungary)	Balázs Dzsudzsák	20	2	22
2	77	FW	(Hungary)	Márk Szécsi	9	0	9
3	11	DF	(Hungary)	János Ferenczi	4	0	4
Total					33	2	35

== Managerial statistics ==
As of match played 24 May 2025

Managerial record by manager and tenure
Manager	Nat.	From	To	Season total								Nemzeti Bajnokság I								Magyar Kupa							
Manager	Nat.	From	To	G	W	D	L	GF	GA	GD	Win %	G	W	D	L	GF	GA	GD	Win %	G	W	D	L	GF	GA	GD	Win %
Srđan Blagojević	(Serbia)	Pre-season	26 August 2024	4	1	1	2	4	5	-1	25.00%	4	1	1	2	4	5	-1	25.00%	—	—	—	—	—	—	—	—
Tibor Dombi^{(caretaker)}	(Hungary)	26 August 2024	31 August 2024	1	1	0	0	3	1	+2	100.00%	1	1	0	0	3	1	+2	100.00%	—	—	—	—	—	—	—	—
Csaba Máté	(Hungary)	1 September 2024	27 October 2024	6	1	0	5	8	14	-6	16.67%	5	0	0	5	4	14	-10	0.00%	1	1	0	0	4	0	+4	100.00%
Tibor Dombi^{(caretaker)}	(Hungary)	27 October 2024	11 November 2024	3	0	2	1	4	5	-1	0.00%	2	0	2	0	4	4	0	0.00%	1	0	0	1	0	1	-1	0.00%
Nestor El Maestro	(Serbia) (England)	11 November 2024	present	21	7	4	10	37	35	+2	33.33%	21	7	4	10	37	35	+2	33.33%	—	—	—	—	—	—	—	—
Total				35	10	7	18	56	60	-4	28.57%	33	9	7	17	52	59	-7	27.27%	2	1	0	1	4	1	+3	50.00%

== Attendances ==
The table contains the number of attendances of Debreceni VSC domestic matches.
Clicking on the competitions leads to the number of spectators for all the matches of the competitions.
The gold indicates the highest attendances, and the lowest attendances with pink .
Home stadium: Nagyerdei Stadion, Debrecen – Capacity: 20,340

League	Matches	Attendances	Average		High		Low	
League	Matches	Attendances	Att.	%	Att.	%	Att.	%
Nemzeti Bajnokság I	16	90,887	5,680	27.9%	10,634	52.2%	2,612	12.8%
Magyar Kupa	—	—	—	—	—	—	—	—
Total	16	90,887	5,680	27.9%	10,634	52.2%	2,612	12.8%

• Nemzeti Bajnokság I: Domestic league;
• Magyar Kupa: Domestic cup;

Nemzeti Bajnokság I
Round	Date	Opponent	Attendances	%	Ref.
Round 4	17 August 2024	Diósgyőr	7,077	34.8%	
Round 6	31 August 2024	Zalaegerszeg	5,072	24.9%	
Round 8	28 September 2024	MTK	5,321	26.2%	
Round 10	19 October 2024	Paks	4,664	22.9%	
Round 13	9 November 2024	Győr	4,521	22.2%	
Round 14	24 November 2024	Kecskemét	2,612	12.8%	
Round 1	5 December 2024	Ferencváros	5,011	24.6%	
Round 16	8 December 2024	Újpest	4,332	21.3%	
Round 18	2 February 2025	Nyíregyháza	8,011	39.4%	
Round 20	15 February 2025	Puskás Akadémia	3,334	16.4%	
Round 22	2 March 2025	Fehérvár	4,744	23.3%	
Round 23	9 March 2025	Ferencváros	10,634	52.2%	
Round 26	5 April 2025	Diósgyőr	5,244	25.8%	
Round 28	19 April 2025	Zalaegerszeg	5,712	28.1%	
Round 30	3 May 2025	MTK	6,534	32.1%	
Round 32	18 May 2025	Paks	8,064	39.6%	
Total			90,887	—	
Average			5,680	27.9%	

Magyar Kupa
Round	Date	Opponent	Attendances	%	Ref.
Total			0	—	
Average			0	—	

== Awards and nominations ==
Keys
M	Matches	W	Won	D	Drawn	L	Lost
Pts	Points	GF	Goals for	GA	Goals against	GD	Goal difference
Pos.	Position	Pld	Played	G	Goals	A	Assists
(H)	Debreceni VSC were the home team.			(A)	Debreceni VSC were the away team.		
Player	Young Hungarian Player, who is a Hungarian player and was born 2004 or after						
Player^{*}	Player who joined Debreceni VSC permanently or on loan during the season						
Player^{†}	Player who departed Debreceni VSC permanently or on loan during the season						
Player^{#}	Player who playing parallel in the Debreceni VSC's second team (DVSC II on the Tier 3, NB III) and in the Debreceni VSC's cooperated team (Mezőkövesd on the Tier 2, NB II)						

=== Weekly awards ===
==== Player of the Round ====
Selection of the Round of Nemzeti Bajnokság by M4 Sport TV, Nemzeti Sport, Csakfoci and Sofascore websites and Player of the Week (POW) by Nemzeti Sport.

Round	Opponent	Pos.	Player	Selection of the Round				POW	Ref.
Round	Opponent	Pos.	Player	Nemzeti Sport	M4 Sport TV	Csakfoci	Sofascore	POW	Ref.
Round 2	Győr (A)	GK	(Hungary) Balázs Megyeri	Yes		Yes	Yes	Yes	
Round 2	Győr (A)	DF	(Montenegro) Dušan Lagator				Yes		
Round 2	Győr (A)	DF	(Hungary) János Ferenczi	Yes					
Round 2	Győr (A)	MF	(France) Brandon Domingues			Yes			
Round 2	Győr (A)	FW	(Hungary) Donát Bárány	Yes		Yes	Yes		
Round 3	Kecskemét (A)	MF	(France) Brandon Domingues	Yes		Yes			
Round 4	Diósgyőr (H)	FW	(Ivory Coast) Yacouba Silue			Yes			
Round 6	Zalaegerszeg (H)	DF	(Hungary) János Ferenczi		Yes	Yes			
Round 6	Zalaegerszeg (H)	DF	(Hungary) Bence Batik	Yes					
Round 6	Zalaegerszeg (H)	MF	(Hungary) Márk Szécsi			Yes			
Round 6	Zalaegerszeg (H)	MF	(Hungary) Balázs Dzsudzsák	Yes	Yes	Yes	Yes		
Round 8	MTK (H)	FW	(Hungary) Balázs Dzsudzsák				Yes		
Round 9	Puskás Akadémia (A)	DF	(Montenegro) Meldin Drešković			Yes			
Round 12	Ferencváros (A)	DF	(Serbia) Aranđel Stojković			Yes			
Round 12	Ferencváros (A)	DF	(Montenegro) Meldin Drešković	Yes	Yes	Yes	Yes		
Round 12	Ferencváros (A)	DF	(Hungary) Gergő Kocsis	Yes					
Round 15	Diósgyőr (A)	FW	(Hungary) Balázs Dzsudzsák				Yes		
Round 1	Ferencváros (H)	MF	(Hungary) Balázs Dzsudzsák			Yes			
Round 1	Ferencváros (H)	MF	(France) Brandon Domingues			Yes			
Round 1	Ferencváros (H)	FW	(Hungary) Donát Bárány			Yes			
Round 16	Újpest (H)	DF	(Hungary) Márk Szécsi			Yes			
Round 17	Zalaegerszeg (A)	MF	(Montenegro) Meldin Drešković				Yes		
Round 18	Nyíregyháza (H)	GK	(Hungary) Krisztián Hegyi^{*}	Yes		Yes			
Round 18	Nyíregyháza (H)	DF	(Hungary) János Ferenczi	Yes					
Round 18	Nyíregyháza (H)	DF	(Hungary) Ádám Lang			Yes			
Round 18	Nyíregyháza (H)	MF	(Hungary) Botond Vajda (s)			Yes			
Round 18	Nyíregyháza (H)	MF	(Central African Republic) Amos Youga	Yes					
Round 18	Nyíregyháza (H)	FW	(Hungary) Tamás Szűcs		Yes				
Round 18	Nyíregyháza (H)	FW	(Brazil) Maurides	Yes	Yes	Yes	Yes		
Round 18	Nyíregyháza (H)	FW	(Hungary) Donát Bárány	Yes					
Round 19	MTK (A)	DF	(Hungary) Ádám Lang			Yes			
Round 19	MTK (A)	DF	(Hungary) Botond Vajda			Yes			
Round 19	MTK (A)	MF	(Central African Republic) Amos Youga			Yes			
Round 19	MTK (A)	MF	(France) Brandon Domingues		Yes		Yes		
Round 21	Paks (A)	FW	(Brazil) Maurides		Yes	Yes	Yes		
Round 22	Fehérvár (H)	FW	(Hungary) Balázs Dzsudzsák				Yes		
Round 24	Győr (A)	DF	(Hungary) Ádám Lang^{⊕}		Yes	Yes	Yes		
Round 24	Győr (A)	FW	(France) Brandon Domingues				Yes		

(s) Substitute

==== Goal of the Round ====
Goal of the Round of Nemzeti Bajnokság by the M4 Sport website.

Keys

- Score – The score at the time of the goal. Debreceni VSC's score listed first.
- Final score – The score at full time; Debreceni VSC's listed first.

Round	Pos.	Player	Placement	Score	Final score	Opponent	Date	Ref.
3	MF	(France) Brandon Domingues	2nd	1–0	1–1	Kecskemét (A)	9 Aug 2024	

=== Yearly awards ===
==== HLSZ Cup ====
Award	Manager or Player	Result	Ref.
2024 Best U21 Player of the Year	(Hungary) Botond Vajda	Won	

==== Zilahi Award ====
The Zilahi Award is a Hungarian football traveling award, which is awarded every year by the management of Debrecen VSC to the best performing Debrecen VSC player in the given season. The award was founded in 1999 and was presented for the first time after the 1999–2000 season. It was named after Zoltán Zilahi, the legendary Debreceni VSC striker of the fifties and sixties.

- Zilahi Award in 2025: Donát Bárány

Previous years prize winners and the source in Hungarian language: Zilahi-díj

== Milestones ==
Keys
Final score	The score at full time; Debreceni VSC's listed first.	No.	Squad number	Pos.	Position
Opponent	The opponent team without a flag is Hungarian.	(N)	The game was played at a neutral site.		
(H)	Debreceni VSC were the home team.	(A)	Debreceni VSC were the away team.		
Player	Young Hungarian Player, who is a Hungarian player and was born 2004 or after				
Player^{*}	Player who joined Debreceni VSC on loan during the season				
Player^{⊕}	Player who joined Debreceni VSC permanently during the season				
Player^{†}	Player who departed Debreceni VSC permanently or on loan during the season				

Debuts

The following players made their competitive debuts for Debreceni VSC's first team during the campaign.

Date	No.	Pos.	Player	Age	Final score	Opponent	Competition	Ref.
14 September 2024	27	DF	(Hungary) Gergő Kocsis	30	4–0	Békéscsaba (A)	Magyar Kupa, Round of 64	
14 September 2024	6	MF	(Croatia) Neven Đurasek	26	4–0	Békéscsaba (A)	Magyar Kupa, Round of 64	
14 September 2024	—	Manager	(Hungary) Csaba Máté	54	4–0	Békéscsaba (A)	Magyar Kupa, Round of 64	
24 November 2024	—	Manager	(Serbia) Nestor El Maestro	41	2–2	Kecskemét (H)	Nemzeti Bajnokság, Round 14	
2 February 2025	47	GK	(Hungary) Krisztián Hegyi^{*}	22	3–1	Nyíregyháza (H)	Nemzeti Bajnokság, Round 18	
2 February 2025	26	DF	(Hungary) Ádám Lang	32	3–1	Nyíregyháza (H)	Nemzeti Bajnokság, Round 18	
2 February 2025	28	DF	(Austria) Maximilian Hofmann	31	3–1	Nyíregyháza (H)	Nemzeti Bajnokság, Round 18	
2 February 2025	20	MF	(Central African Republic) Amos Youga	32	3–1	Nyíregyháza (H)	Nemzeti Bajnokság, Round 18	
2 February 2025	33	MF	(Bulgaria) Kristiyan Malinov	30	3–1	Nyíregyháza (H)	Nemzeti Bajnokság, Round 18	
2 February 2025	25	FW	(Brazil) Maurides^{*}	30	3–1	Nyíregyháza (H)	Nemzeti Bajnokság, Round 18	
22 February 2025	15	DF	(Sweden) Henrik Castegren	28	3–4	Paks (A)	Nemzeti Bajnokság, Round 21	
28 March 2025	86	GK	(Hungary) Donát Pálfi	25	3–1	Kecskemét (A)	Nemzeti Bajnokság, Round 25	
19 April 2025	57	GK	(Japan) Shūichi Gonda^{⊕}	36	4–3	Zalaegerszeg (H)	Nemzeti Bajnokság, Round 28	

50th appearances

The following players made their 50th appearances for Debreceni VSC's first team during the campaign.

Date	No.	Pos.	Player	Age	Final score	Opponent	Competition	Ref.
9 August 2024	16	GK	(Hungary) Balázs Megyeri	34	1–1	Kecskemét (A)	Nemzeti Bajnokság, Round 3	
17 August 2024	14	DF	(Montenegro) Meldin Drešković	26	0–1	Diósgyőr (H)	Nemzeti Bajnokság, Round 4	
21 September 2024	99	MF	(France) Brandon Domingues	24	2–3	Nyíregyháza (A)	Nemzeti Bajnokság, Round 7	
4 October 2024	21	MF	(Hungary) Dominik Kocsis	22	0–1	Puskás Akadémia (A)	Nemzeti Bajnokság, Round 9	

100th appearances

The following players made their 100th appearances for Debreceni VSC's first team during the campaign.

Date	No.	Pos.	Player	Age	Final score	Opponent	Competition	Ref.
15 February 2025	17	FW	(Hungary) Donát Bárány	24	1–2	Puskás Akadémia (H)	Nemzeti Bajnokság, Round 20	

150th appearances

The following players made their 150th appearances for Debreceni VSC's first team during the campaign.

Date	No.	Pos.	Player	Age	Final score	Opponent	Competition	Ref.
4 October 2024	10	MF	(Hungary) Balázs Dzsudzsák	37	0–1	Puskás Akadémia (A)	Nemzeti Bajnokság, Round 9	

200th appearances

The following players made their 200th appearances for Debreceni VSC's first team during the campaign.

Date	No.	Pos.	Player	Age	Final score	Opponent	Competition	Ref.
15 February 2025	77	FW	(Hungary) Márk Szécsi	30	1–2	Puskás Akadémia (H)	Nemzeti Bajnokság, Round 20	

250th appearances

The following players made their 250th appearances for Debreceni VSC's first team during the campaign.

Date	No.	Pos.	Player	Age	Final score	Opponent	Competition	Ref.
25 April 2025	11	DF	(Hungary) János Ferenczi	34	0–1	Nyíregyháza (A)	Nemzeti Bajnokság, Round 29	

First goals

The following players scored their first goals for Debreceni VSC's first team during the campaign.

Keys

- Score – The score at the time of the goal. Debreceni VSC's score listed first.
- Final score – The score at full time; Debreceni VSC's listed first.

Date	No.	Pos.	Player	Age	Score	Final score	Opponent	Competition	Ref.
2 August 2024	42	FW	(Ivory Coast) Yacouba Silue	22	3–0	3–0	Győr (A)	Nemzeti Bajnokság I, Round 2	
28 September 2024	8	FW	(Hungary) Tamás Szűcs	19	2–2	2–3	MTK (H)	Nemzeti Bajnokság I, Round 8	
24 November 2024	13	MF	(Hungary) Soma Szuhodovszki	24	2–2	2–2	Kecskemét (H)	Nemzeti Bajnokság I, Round 14	
2 February 2025	25	FW	(Brazil) Maurides^{*⊕}	30	2–1	3–1	Nyíregyháza (H)	Nemzeti Bajnokság I, Round 18	
28 February 2025	33	MF	(Bulgaria) Kristiyan Malinov^{⊕}	30	3–1	3–1	Kecskemét (A)	Nemzeti Bajnokság I, Round 25	
10 May 2025	18	FW	(Nigeria) Shedrach Kaye	19	2–3	2–4	Puskás Akadémia (A)	Nemzeti Bajnokság I, Round 31	

== See also ==
- List of Debreceni VSC seasons
