= Neven Đurasek =

Croatian footballer (born 1998)

Personal information
- Date of birth: 15 August 1998 (age 28)
- Place of birth: Varaždin, Croatia
- Height: 1.80 m (5 ft 11 in)
- Position: Midfielder

Team information
- Current team: Zrinjski Mostar
- Number: 30

Youth career
- 2013–2015: Varaždin
- 2015–2016: Dinamo Zagreb

Senior career*
Years	Team	Apps	(Gls)
2016–2018	Dinamo Zagreb II	36	(5)
2018–2022	Dinamo Zagreb	3	(0)
2018–2019	→ Lokomotiva (loan)	15	(0)
2019–2021	→ Varaždin (loan)	61	(4)
2021–2022	→ Dnipro-1 (loan)	18	(0)
2022	→ Olimpija Ljubljana (loan)	6	(0)
2022–2023	Shakhtar Donetsk	18	(1)
2023–2024	Aris	22	(1)
2024–2025	Debrecen	10	(0)
2025–	Zrinjski Mostar	29	(1)

International career
2014	Croatia U15	2	(1)
2014	Croatia U16	1	(0)
2014–2015	Croatia U17	13	(0)
2015	Croatia U18	6	(0)
2017	Croatia U19	3	(0)
2018	Croatia U20	1	(0)
2019–2021	Croatia U21	5	(1)
- * Club domestic league appearances and goals as of 23 August 2026

Neven Đurasek (born 15 August 1998) is a Croatian professional footballer who plays for Bosnian Premier League club Zrinjski Mostar.

== Career ==
On 5 July 2023, Đurasek signed a two-year contract with Greek Super League side Aris with the option of an additional season.

== Career statistics ==
As of match played 23 August 2026

Appearances and goals by club, season and competition
Club	Season	League			National cup (Note: Includes Croatian Cup, Ukrainian Cup, Greek Cup, Hungarian Cup, Bosnian Cup)		Continental		Total	
Club	Season	Division	Apps	Goals	Apps	Goals	Apps	Goals	Apps	Goals
Dinamo Zagreb II	2016–17	Croatian Second League	17	0	—		—		17	0
Dinamo Zagreb II	2017–18	Croatian Second League	19	5	—		—		19	5
Dinamo Zagreb II	Total		36	5	—		—		36	5
Dinamo Zagreb	2017–18	Croatian First League	3	0	—		—		3	0
Lokomotiva	2018–19	Croatian First League	15	0	—		—		15	0
Varaždin	2019–20	Croatian First League	29	1	—		—		29	1
Varaždin	2020–21	Croatian First League	32	3	2	0	—		34	3
Varaždin	Total		61	4	2	0	—		63	4
Dnipro-1 (loan)	2021–22	Ukrainian Premier League	18	0	1	0	—		19	0
Olimpija Ljubljana (loan)	2021–22	Slovenian PrvaLiga	6	0	—		—		6	0
Shakhtar Donetsk	2022–23	Ukrainian Premier League	18	1	—		8 (Note: Five appearances in UEFA Champions League, three appearances in UEFA Europa League)	0	26	1
Aris Thessaloniki	2023–24	Super League Greece	22	1	3	0	4 (Note: Appearances in UEFA Europa Conference League)	1	29	2
Debrecen	2024–25	Nemzeti Bajnokság I	10	0	1	0	—		11	0
Zrinjski Mostar	2025–26	Bosnian Premier League	26	0	4	0	8 (Note: One appearance in UEFA Europa League, seven appearances in UEFA Conference League)	0	38	0
Zrinjski Mostar	2026–27	Bosnian Premier League	3	1	0	0	—		3	1
Zrinjski Mostar	Total		29	1	4	0	8	0	41	1
Career total			218	13	11	0	20	1	249	14
