= Muller (footballer, born 1990) =

Brazilian footballer

Personal information
- Full name: Muller Pereira Roque
- Date of birth: 15 November 1990 (age 35)
- Place of birth: Barretos, Brazil
- Height: 1.89 m (6 ft 2 in)
- Position: Centre back

Youth career
- Internacional

Senior career*
Years	Team	Apps	(Gls)
2009–2014	Internacional	0	(0)
2009–2010	→ Mirandela (loan)	1	(0)
2010–2011	→ Oliveira do Douro (loan)		
2011	→ Tigres do Brasil (loan)	0	(0)
2011	→ Olímpia (loan)	7	(0)
2014	Bragantino	0	(0)
2015	Tourizense	12	(0)
2015	Gondomar	2	(0)
2016	PS Kemi	17	(0)
- * Club domestic league appearances and goals

Muller Pereira Roque (born 15 November 1990), simply known as Muller, is a Brazilian retired footballer who played as a central defender.

Muller's brothers Maicon and Maurides are also footballers. The former is also a defender, while the latter is as a forward.
