= Maurides =

Brazilian footballer

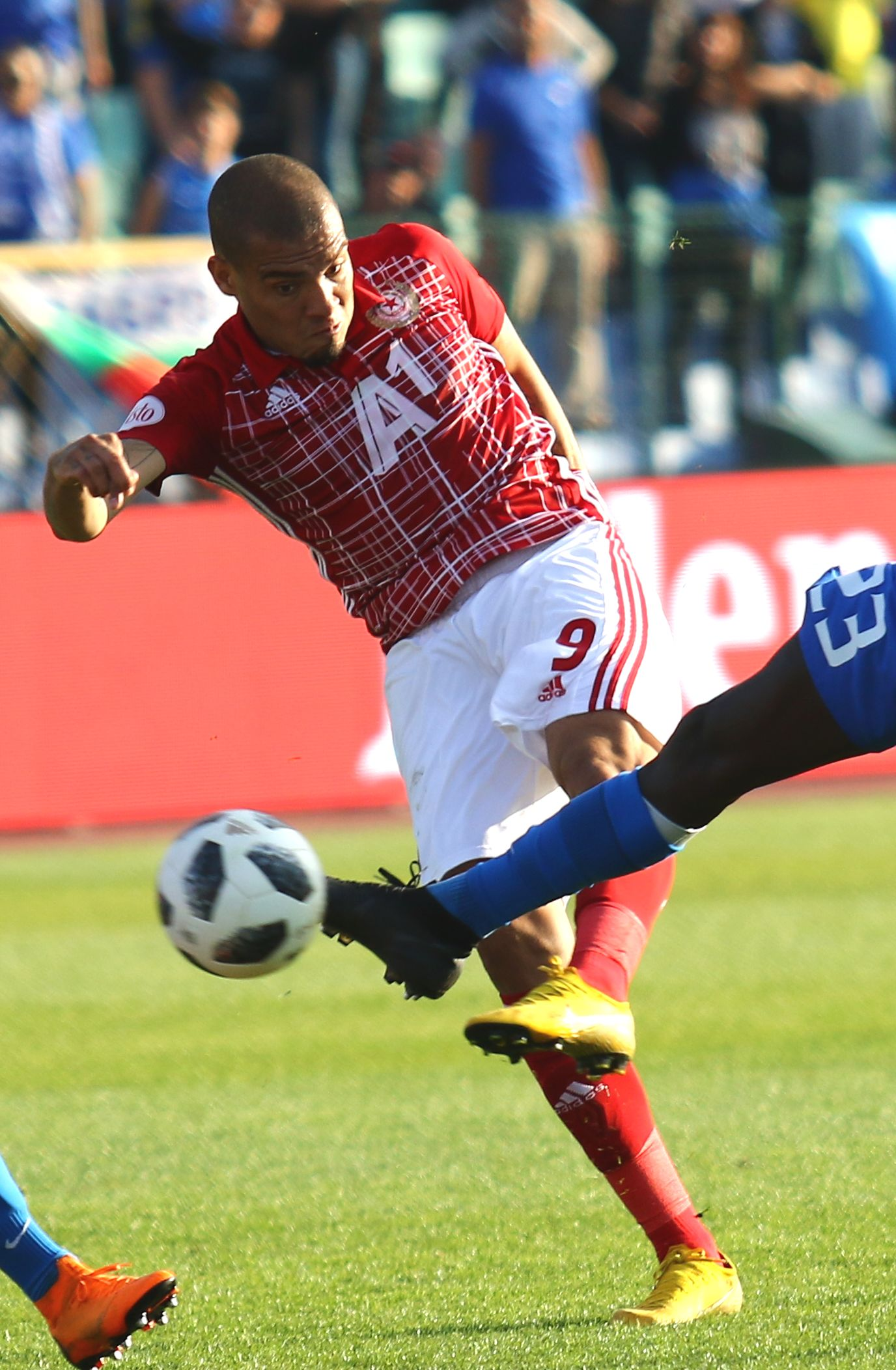
- Maurides in 2018 with CSKA Sofia

Personal information
- Full name: Maurides Roque Junior
- Date of birth: 10 March 1994 (age 32)
- Place of birth: Colômbia, Brazil
- Height: 1.89 m (6 ft 2 in)
- Position: Striker

Team information
- Current team: Dinamo Batumi

Youth career
- 2009: América-SP
- 2009–2014: Internacional

Senior career*
Years	Team	Apps	(Gls)
2012–2017	Internacional	8	(0)
2015	→ Atlético GO (loan)	0	(0)
2015–2016	→ Arouca (loan)	32	(5)
2016	→ Figueirense (loan)	6	(0)
2017–2018	Belenenses	45	(14)
2018–2019	CSKA Sofia	21	(9)
2019	Changchun Yatai	13	(2)
2020	FC Anyang	10	(3)
2021–2022	Radomiak Radom	47	(9)
2023–2025	FC St. Pauli	15	(0)
2025	→ Debrecen (loan)	16	(5)
2025–2026	Radomiak Radom	34	(8)
2026–	Dinamo Batumi	0	(0)
- * Club domestic league appearances and goals as of 22:39, 29 May 2026 (UTC)

Maurides Roque Junior (born 10 March 1994), commonly known as Maurides, is a Brazilian professional footballer who plays as a striker for Erovnuli Liga club Dinamo Batumi.

He is the younger brother of two footballers, Muller and Maicon.

== Career ==
In 2013, after being named to the first team of Sport Club Internacional, Maurides played against América Mineiro in the Copa do Brasil. In the 88th minute of the game, Maurides celebrated a goal trying a backflip and sustained an injury to his right knee that kept him sidelined for 13 months.

After several spells in Brazil and Portugal, on 12 July 2018, Maurides signed with Bulgarian club CSKA Sofia for an undisclosed fee.

In February 2019, he signed a two-year contract with Changchun Yatai.

Maurides joined Korean second tier side FC Anyang as a free agent in February 2020, after China League One was postponed indefinitely.

In December 2022, it was announced Maurides would join 2. Bundesliga club FC St. Pauli for the second half of the 2022–23 season.

On 15 July 2025, Maurides returned to Radomiak Radom and signed a three-year contract with the club.

On 5 July 2026, Georgian club Dinamo Batumi announced they had signed Maurides for an undisclosed fee.

== Career statistics ==
As of match played 23 May 2026

Appearances and goals by club, season and competition
Club	Season	League			National cup (Note: Includes Copa do Brasil, Taça de Portugal, Bulgarian Cup, Chinese FA Cup, Korean FA Cup, Polish Cup, DFB-Pokal)		Continental		Other		Total	
Club	Season	Division	Apps	Goals	Apps	Goals	Apps	Goals	Apps	Goals	Apps	Goals
Internacional	2012	Série A	7	0	0	0	—		—		7	0
Internacional	2013	Série A	0	0	1	1	—		2 (Note: Appearances in Campeonato Gaúcho)	0	3	1
Internacional	2014	Série A	1	0	0	0	—		—		1	0
Internacional	Total		8	0	1	1	—		2	0	11	1
Atlético GO (loan)	2015	Série B	0	0	1	0	—		5 (Note: Appearances in Campeonato Goiano)	1	6	1
Arouca (loan)	2015–16	Primeira Liga	32	5	3	1	—		1 (Note: Appearance(s) in Taça da Liga)	0	36	6
Figueirense (loan)	2016	Série A	6	0	1	0	0	0	0	0	7	0
Belenenses	2016–17	Primeira Liga	12	6	0	0	—		0	0	12	6
Belenenses	2017–18	Primeira Liga	33	8	0	0	—		3	0	36	8
Belenenses	Total		45	14	0	0	0	0	3	0	48	14
CSKA Sofia	2018–19	First League	21	9	2	0	4 (Note: Appearances in UEFA Europa League)	4	—		27	13
Changchun Yatai	2019	China League One	13	2	1	1	—		—		14	3
FC Anyang	2020	K League 2	10	3	2	0	—		—		12	3
Radomiak Radom	2021–22	Ekstraklasa	31	5	1	0	—		—		32	5
Radomiak Radom	2022–23	Ekstraklasa	16	4	2	1	—		—		18	5
Radomiak Radom	Total		47	9	3	1	—		—		50	10
FC St. Pauli	2022–23	2. Bundesliga	7	0	—		—		—		7	0
FC St. Pauli	2023–24	2. Bundesliga	7	0	2	0	—		—		9	0
FC St. Pauli	2024–25	Bundesliga	1	0	0	0	—		—		1	0
FC St. Pauli	Total		15	0	2	0	—		—		17	0
Debrecen (loan)	2024–25	Nemzeti Bajnokság I	16	5	—		—		—		16	5
Radomiak Radom	2025–26	Ekstraklasa	34	8	1	0	—		—		35	8
Dinamo Batumi	2026	Erovnuli Liga	0	0	0	0	—		—		0	0
Career total			235	54	17	4	4	4	11	1	267	63

== Honours ==
FC St. Pauli

- 2. Bundesliga: 2023–24

Individual

- Nemzeti Bajnokság I Player of the Month: February 2025
