= Csaba Máté =

Hungarian footballer

Personal information
- Date of birth: 23 October 1969 (age 57)
- Place of birth: Szekszárd, Hungary

Team information
- Current team: Akhmat Grozny (assistant manager)

Managerial career
- Years: Team
- 2001–2008: Szekszárdi UFC
- 2008–2010: Hungary (assistant)
- 2009–2010: Haladás II
- 2010–2012: Paksi FC (assistant manager)
- 2012: Paksi FC (caretaker)
- 2012–2013: Ferencváros (assistant)
- 2013: Ferencváros (caretaker)
- 2013–2023: Ferencváros (assistant)
- 2020–2021: Ferencváros II
- 2023: Ferencváros (caretaker)
- 2024: Debrecen
- 2025–: Akhmat Grozny (assistant)

Csaba Máté (born 23 October 1969) is a Hungarian professional football manager and former player. He is an assistant manager with Russian club Akhmat Grozny.

== Early life ==
Máté was born in 1969 in Szekszárd, Hungary.

== Managerial career ==
=== Ferencváros ===
On 20 July 2023, Máté was appointed for the third time as the manager of Hungarian side Ferencváros, after Ferencváros lost to Klaksvíkar Ítróttarfelag in the first round of the 2023–24 UEFA Champions League qualifying phase and play-off round at home 3–0. Máté had only a couple of days to revive the team and he successfully debuted with a 4–0 victory against Shamrock Rovers F.C. in the second round of the 2023–24 UEFA Europa Conference League qualifying phase and play-off round at home. On 6 August 2023, he debuted in the Nemzeti Bajnokság I by beating Fehérvár FC 5–3 at the Sóstói Stadion on the second game week of the 2023–24 Nemzeti Bajnokság I season.

On 27 August 2023, at home Ferencváros beat 6-1 Paks that has been biggest win in the Nemzet Bajnokság I, while managing the club.

On 4 September 2023, he was sacked from Ferencváros and was replaced by former Inter defender, Dejan Stanković.

In an interview with Nemzeti Sport, he said that he was surprised that had been sacked by Ferencváros. However, after two months he feels that he can start working again.

=== Debrecen ===
On 30 August 2024, he was appointed as the manager of Debreceni VSC. He replaced Srđan Blagojević who was dismissed after an unsuccessful start in the 2024–25 Nemzeti Bajnokság I season. Máté debuted with a 4-0 victory in the 2024–25 Magyar Kupa season against Békéscsaba 1912 Előre at the Kórház utcai Stadion on 14 September 2024.

On 19 October 2024, Debrecen lost 5-0 to Paks at the Nagyerdei Stadion. After the match, Máté said that he was not afraid of being sacked. On 26 October 2024, Debrecen lost to Fehérvár 2-0 at the Sóstói Stadion. After the match, Máté said that he would discuss his future at the club.

On 27 October 2024, he was sacked.

=== Akhmat Grozny ===
On 8 August 2025, Máté was hired by Russian Premier League club Akhmat Grozny as an assistant to Stanislav Cherchesov. Máté previously assisted Cherchesov at Ferencváros.

== Managerial statistics ==
As of 27 October 2024

Team	Nat	From	To	Record							
Team	Nat	From	To	P	W	D	L	GF	GA	GD	W%
Paks (assistant manager)	Hungary	11 August 2012	30 August 2012	3	0	2	1	5	6	−1	0.00
Ferencváros (assistant manager)	Hungary	2 December 2013	18 December 2013	2	1	0	1	3	3	+0	50.00
Ferencváros (B-team)	Hungary	1 July 2020	30 June 2021	38	20	10	8	75	36	+39	52.63
Ferencváros (assistant manager)	Hungary	19 July 2023	4 September 2023	10	9	0	1	39	10	+29	90.00
Debrecen	Hungary	1 September 2024	27 October 2024	6	1	0	5	8	14	−6	16.67
Total				59	31	12	16	130	69	+61	52.54

== Personal life ==
Máté is the father of Hungarian footballer Roland Máté. He speaks Flemish dialects.
