= Botond Vajda =

Hungarian footballer (born 2004)

Personal information
- Date of birth: 15 March 2004 (age 22)
- Place of birth: Rožňava, Slovakia
- Height: 1.74 m (5 ft 9 in)
- Position: Midfielder

Team information
- Current team: Debrecen
- Number: 22

Youth career
- 2014–2016: Sajóvölgye Focisuli
- 2016–2022: Diósgyőr

Senior career*
| Years | Team | Apps | (Gls) |
| 2020–2022 | Diósgyőr II | 16 | (3) |
| 2022–2023 | Diósgyőr | 5 | (0) |
| 2023 | → Tiszakécske (loan) | 11 | (0) |
| 2023– | Debrecen | 69 | (7) |
| 2023– | Debrecen II | 3 | (1) |

International career^{‡}
| 2023 | Hungary U19 | 3 | (0) |
| 2024– | Hungary U21 | 3 | (0) |
- * Club domestic league appearances and goals as of 30 May 2026 ‡ National team caps and goals as of 10 October 2024

Botond Vajda (born 15 March 2004) is a professional footballer, who plays as a midfielder for Nemzeti Bajnokság I club Debrecen. Born in Slovakia, he is a youth international for Hungary.

== Career ==
On 12 August 2022, Vajda was promoted to the first team Nemzeti Bajnokság II side Diósgyőr and signed his first professional contract in the process.

On 20 June 2023, he was transferred to Debrecen in the Nemzeti Bajnokság I for an undisclosed fee.

== Career statistics ==
As of match played 22 August 2025

Appearances and goals by club, season and competition
| Club | Season | League | | | Magyar Kupa | | Europe | | Total | |
| Club | Season | Division | Apps | Goals | Apps | Goals | Apps | Goals | Apps | Goals |
|---|---|---|---|---|---|---|---|---|---|---|
| Diósgyőr II | 2020–21 | Nemzeti Bajnokság III | 1 | 0 | — | | — | | 1 | 0 |
| Diósgyőr II | 2021–22 | Nemzeti Bajnokság III | 3 | 0 | — | | — | | 3 | 0 |
| Diósgyőr II | 2022–23 | Nemzeti Bajnokság III | 12 | 3 | — | | — | | 12 | 3 |
| Diósgyőr II | Total | | 16 | 3 | — | | — | | 16 | 3 |
| Diósgyőr | 2021–22 | Nemzeti Bajnokság II | 1 | 0 | — | | — | | 1 | 0 |
| Diósgyőr | 2022–23 | Nemzeti Bajnokság II | 4 | 0 | — | | — | | 4 | 0 |
| Diósgyőr | Total | | 5 | 0 | — | | — | | 5 | 0 |
| Tiszakécske (loan) | 2022–23 | Nemzeti Bajnokság II | 11 | 0 | — | | — | | 11 | 0 |
| Debrecen | 2023–24 | Nemzeti Bajnokság I | 21 | 5 | 0 | 0 | 0 | 0 | 21 | 5 |
| Debrecen | 2024–25 | Nemzeti Bajnokság I | 25 | 2 | 1 | 0 | — | | 26 | 2 |
| Debrecen | 2025–26 | Nemzeti Bajnokság I | 2 | 0 | 0 | 0 | — | | 2 | 0 |
| Debrecen | Total | | 48 | 7 | 1 | 0 | 0 | 0 | 49 | 7 |
| Debrecen II | 2023–24 | Nemzeti Bajnokság III | 2 | 1 | — | | — | | 2 | 1 |
| Debrecen II | 2024–25 | Nemzeti Bajnokság III | 1 | 0 | — | | — | | 1 | 0 |
| Debrecen II | Total | | 3 | 1 | — | | — | | 3 | 1 |
| Career total | | | 83 | 11 | 1 | 0 | 0 | 0 | 84 | 11 |
