= Kristiyan Malinov =

Bulgarian footballer

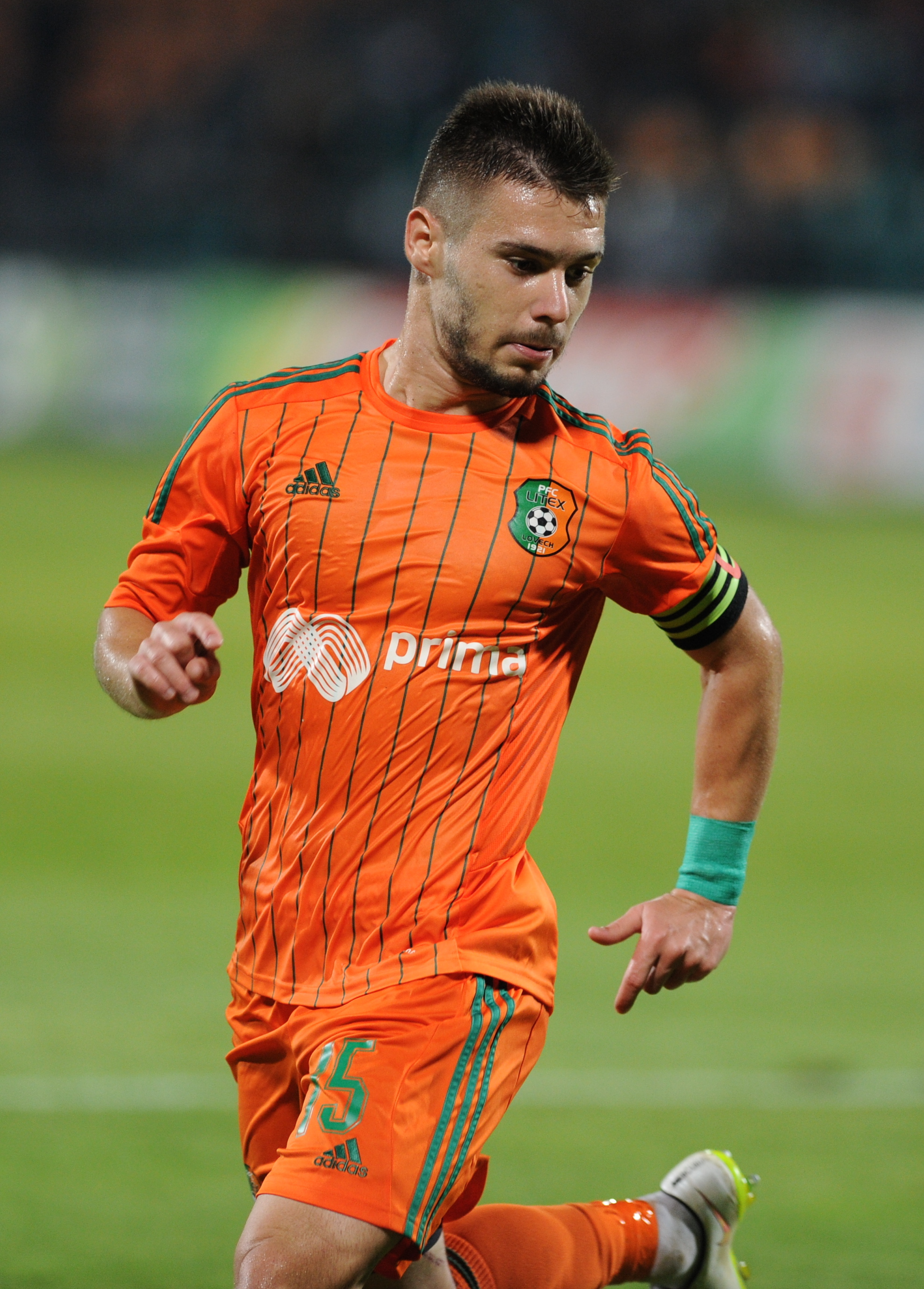
- Malinov playing for Litex in 2015

Personal information
- Full name: Kristiyan Aleksandrov Malinov
- Date of birth: 30 March 1994 (age 32)
- Place of birth: Petrich, Bulgaria
- Height: 1.71 m (5 ft 7 in)
- Position: Midfielder

Youth career
- 2004–2007: Belasitsa Petrich
- 2007–2008: Pirin 2001
- 2008–2013: Litex Lovech

Senior career*
| Years | Team | Apps | (Gls) |
| 2011–2016 | Litex Lovech | 44 | (4) |
| 2013–2014 | → Dobrudzha (loan) | 26 | (4) |
| 2016 | Litex Lovech II | 11 | (0) |
| 2016–2020 | CSKA Sofia | 105 | (6) |
| 2016–2017 | CSKA Sofia II | 9 | (1) |
| 2020–2023 | OH Leuven | 66 | (2) |
| 2023–2024 | K.V. Kortrijk | 18 | (0) |
| 2025 | Debrecen | 11 | (1) |
| 2025–2026 | Botev Vratsa | 11 | (0) |

International career^{‡}
| 2010 | Bulgaria U17 | 3 | (0) |
| 2014–2016 | Bulgaria U21 | 12 | (1) |
| 2015–2022 | Bulgaria | 29 | (0) |
- * Club domestic league appearances and goals as of 26 September 2026 ‡ National team caps and goals as of 12 June 2022

Kristiyan Aleksandrov Malinov (Bulgarian: Кристиян Александров Малинов; born 30 March 1994) is a Bulgarian professional footballer who plays as a midfielder. He is currently unemployed after most recently playing for Botev Vratsa.

Born in Petrich, Malinov began his youth career with Belasitsa and spent three years in the academy before moving to Pirin 2001. In 2008, he joined Litex Lovech, where he developed in their academy and became a professional in 2013. Malinov made his senior debut while on loan at Dobrudzha in the 2013–14 season, before he broke into Litex's first team during following campaign. In June 2016, he joined CSKA Sofia.

In 2015, Malinov won his first cap for Bulgaria, having previously played for the under-21 team.

== Club career ==
=== Litex Lovech ===
Malinov joined Litex Lovech's Academy as a fourteen-year-old after playing junior football for his home-town club Belasitsa Petrich and Pirin 2001. He progressed through the club's youth system and made his first appearance in a senior match day squad in November 2011, sitting on the bench for an A Group match against Lokomotiv Plovdiv.

==== Loan to Dobrudzha ====
In July 2013, Malinov was loaned to B Group team Dobrudzha Dobrich for the 2013–14 season. He made his debut in a 1–0 home win over Akademik Svishtov on 3 August 2013. Coached by former Litex's forward Svetoslav Todorov, Malinov made an immediate impact, appearing in all 26 league matches, scoring four goals. He was substituted only once during the entire league season in the second division.

==== Return to Litex Lovech ====
Malinov returned to Litex at the end of the season. He made his debut in the team's opening league match of the 2014–15 campaign against CSKA Sofia on 20 July 2014, playing the full 90 minutes in the centre of midfield. On 14 September, he scored his first goal in a 2–0 home win over Haskovo. On 29 November 2014, Malinov opened the scoring against Levski Sofia at Georgi Asparuhov Stadium. Later in the match Litex went 2–1 down, but Malinov created Litex's second goal, which was scored by Kiril Despodov for a 2–2 draw.

=== CSKA Sofia ===
In June 2016 Malinov and a big part of the Litex squad moved to CSKA Sofia since the team took the license of Litex for Bulgarian First League. For four seasons he played a total of 129 games with the club in all competitions, in which he scored 7 goals and recorded 14 assists.

=== OH Leuven ===
Malinov joined Belgian club Oud-Heverlee Leuven on 19 August 2020. On 22 August, he made his debut in a 3–1 home defeat against Charleroi, playing the full 90 minutes.

=== Debrecen ===
Malinov joined Hungarian club Debrecen on 28 December 2024.

== International career ==
On 7 February 2015, Malinov made his first appearance for Bulgaria, in the 0–0 draw with Romania in a non-official friendly match, being replaced in the 63rd minute by Stefan Velev. He earned his first cap on 8 June 2015, in the 0–4 loss against Turkey in another exhibition game, after coming on as a substitute during the second half.

== Career statistics ==
=== Club ===
As of 10 May 2025

Appearances and goals by club, season and competition
| Club | Season | League | | | Cup | | Europe | | Other | | Total | |
| Club | Season | Division | Apps | Goals | Apps | Goals | Apps | Goals | Apps | Goals | Apps | Goals |
|---|---|---|---|---|---|---|---|---|---|---|---|---|
| Litex Lovech | 2011–12 | A Group | 0 | 0 | 0 | 0 | 0 | 0 | – | | 0 | 0 |
| Litex Lovech | 2012–13 | A Group | 0 | 0 | 0 | 0 | – | | – | | 0 | 0 |
| Litex Lovech | 2014–15 | A Group | 30 | 2 | 4 | 0 | 1 | 0 | – | | 35 | 2 |
| Litex Lovech | 2015–16 | A Group | 14 | 2 | 3 | 1 | 2 | 0 | – | | 19 | 3 |
| Litex Lovech | Total | | 44 | 4 | 7 | 1 | 3 | 0 | 0 | 0 | 54 | 5 |
| Dobrudzha (loan) | 2013–14 | B Group | 26 | 4 | 4 | 0 | – | | – | | 30 | 4 |
| Litex Lovech II | 2015–16 | B Group | 11 | 0 | – | | – | | – | | 11 | 0 |
| CSKA Sofia | 2016–17 | Bulgarian First League | 17 | 0 | 1 | 0 | – | | – | | 18 | 0 |
| CSKA Sofia | 2017–18 | Bulgarian First League | 29 | 3 | 3 | 0 | – | | – | | 32 | 3 |
| CSKA Sofia | 2018–19 | Bulgarian First League | 31 | 1 | 5 | 0 | 3 | 0 | – | | 39 | 1 |
| CSKA Sofia | 2019–20 | Bulgarian First League | 27 | 2 | 6 | 0 | 6 | 1 | – | | 39 | 3 |
| CSKA Sofia | 2020–21 | Bulgarian First League | 1 | 0 | 0 | 0 | 0 | 0 | – | | 1 | 0 |
| CSKA Sofia | Total | | 105 | 6 | 15 | 0 | 9 | 1 | 0 | 0 | 129 | 7 |
| CSKA Sofia II | 2016–17 | Bulgarian Second League | 9 | 1 | – | | – | | – | | 9 | 1 |
| OH Leuven | 2020–21 | Belgian First Division A | 27 | 2 | 1 | 0 | – | | – | | 28 | 2 |
| OH Leuven | 2021–22 | Belgian First Division A | 18 | 0 | 2 | 0 | – | | – | | 20 | 0 |
| OH Leuven | 2022–23 | Belgian First Division A | 21 | 0 | 1 | 0 | – | | – | | 22 | 0 |
| OH Leuven | Total | | 66 | 2 | 4 | 0 | 0 | 0 | 0 | 0 | 70 | 2 |
| KV Kortrijk | 2023–24 | Belgian Pro League | 18 | 0 | 1 | 0 | – | | 2 | 0 | 21 | 0 |
| KV Kortrijk | 2024–25 | Belgian Pro League | 0 | 0 | 0 | 0 | – | | – | | 0 | 0 |
| KV Kortrijk | Total | | 18 | 0 | 1 | 0 | 0 | 0 | 2 | 0 | 21 | 0 |
| Debreceni VSC | 2024–25 | Nemzeti Bajnokság | 11 | 1 | 0 | 0 | – | | – | | 11 | 1 |
| Career total | | | 285 | 18 | 30 | 1 | 12 | 1 | 2 | 0 | 239 | 20 |

=== International ===
As of match played 12 June 2022

Appearances and goals by national team and year
| National team | Year | Apps | Goals |
|---|---|---|---|
| Bulgaria | 2015 | 1 | 0 |
| Bulgaria | 2016 | 0 | 0 |
| Bulgaria | 2017 | 0 | 0 |
| Bulgaria | 2018 | 2 | 0 |
| Bulgaria | 2019 | 8 | 0 |
| Bulgaria | 2020 | 7 | 0 |
| Bulgaria | 2021 | 8 | 0 |
| Bulgaria | 2022 | 3 | 0 |
| Total | | 29 | 0 |
