= Krisztián Hegyi =

Hungarian footballer (born 2002)

Personal information
- Full name: Krisztián Hegyi
- Date of birth: 24 September 2002 (age 24)
- Place of birth: Budapest, Hungary
- Height: 1.93 m (6 ft 4 in)
- Position: Goalkeeper

Team information
- Current team: Sparta Prague

Youth career
- 2012–2019: Haladás
- 2019–2023: West Ham United

Senior career*
Years	Team	Apps	(Gls)
2022–2026	West Ham United	0	(0)
2023–2024	→ Stevenage (loan)	4	(0)
2024	→ Den Bosch (loan)	17	(0)
2024–2025	→ Motherwell (loan)	0	(0)
2025	→ Debrecen (loan)	7	(0)
2026	→ MTK Budapest (loan)	14	(0)
2026–	Sparta Prague	0	(0)

International career^{‡}
2017–2018	Hungary U16	6	(0)
2018–2019	Hungary U17	18	(0)
2019	Hungary U18	3	(0)
2021–	Hungary U21	22	(0)
- * Club domestic league appearances and goals as of 30 May 2026 ‡ National team caps and goals as of 11:25, 4 August 2024 (UTC)

Krisztián Hegyi (born 24 September 2002) is a Hungarian professional footballer who plays as a goalkeeper for Czech First League club Sparta Prague and the Hungary under-21 national team.

== Club career ==
In May 2019, Hegyi joined the youth academy of English Premier League side West Ham United despite receiving offers from a number of high-profile clubs around Europe.

During the 2022–23 season, Hegyi was a regular first-choice goalkeeper and occasional captain for the club's U21 side, featuring in the Premier League 2 and EFL Trophy. He has also made several appearances on the bench for the first-team.

On 21 July 2023, Hegyi joined newly promoted League One club Stevenage on a season-long loan. He made his Stevenage debut on 8 August 2023 in the first round of the EFL Cup, against Watford. Hegyi made a late save from Watford's Rhys Healey to deny Watford a winning goal. As the match went to penalties Hegyi saved a spot-kick from Healey as Stevenage won 4–3 on penalties after the match had finished 1–1 after normal time. On 12 August 2023, he debuted in the 2023–24 EFL League One season against Shrewsbury Town with a 2–0 victory. Having struggled to establish himself in the first-team, he returned to West Ham United in January 2024.

On 8 January 2024, Hegyi joined Dutch Eerste Divisie club Den Bosch on loan for the remainder of the season.

On 28 June 2024, he renewed his West Ham United contract until 2027 and joined Motherwell on loan from 1 July for the 2024–25 season. Hegyi was recalled by West Ham United on 11 January 2025.

On 13 January 2025, Hegyi was loaned to Hungarian Nemzeti Bajnokság I club Debrecen for the remainder of the season.

On 1 January 2026, Hegyi was loaned to Hungarian Nemzeti Bajnokság I club MTK Budapest for the remainder of the season.

On 19 June 2026, Hegyi signed a contract with Czech First League club Sparta Prague.

== International career ==
In March 2023, after previously representing Hungary at youth level, Hegyi was called up for the senior team for the first time.

== Style of play ==
West Ham United first-team goalkeeper coach Xavi Valero has praised Hegyi's mentality and maturity, while also stating he strongly believes he will go on to become the long-term No1 for his national team. Valero also added "he has all the tools needed to play at the highest level."

== Career statistics ==
As of match played 14 March 2025

Appearances and goals by club, season and competition
Club	Season	League			National cup		League cup (Note: Includes EFL Cup, Scottish League Cup)		Other		Total	
Club	Season	Division	Apps	Goals	Apps	Goals	Apps	Goals	Apps	Goals	Apps	Goals
West Ham United	2019–20	Premier League	0	0	0	0	0	0	1 (Note: Appearances for U21 team in EFL Trophy)	0	1	0
West Ham United	2020–21	Premier League	0	0	0	0	0	0	0	0	0	0
West Ham United	2021–22	Premier League	0	0	0	0	0	0	3	0	3	0
West Ham United	2022–23	Premier League	0	0	0	0	0	0	2	0	2	0
West Ham United	2023–24	Premier League	0	0	0	0	0	0	0	0	0	0
West Ham United	Total		0	0	0	0	0	0	6	0	6	0
Stevenage (loan)	2023–24	EFL League One	4	0	0	0	2	0	0	0	6	0
Den Bosch (loan)	2023–24	Eerste Divisie	17	0	0	0	0	0	0	0	17	0
Motherwell (loan)	2024–25	Scottish Premiership	0	0	0	0	2	0	0	0	2	0
Debrecen (loan)	2024–25	Nemzeti Bajnokság I	7	0	0	0	0	0	0	0	7	0
Career total			28	0	0	0	4	0	6	0	38	0
