= Jorgo Pëllumbi =

Albanian footballer

Personal information
- Date of birth: 15 July 2000 (age 26)
- Place of birth: Korçë, Albania
- Height: 1.88 m (6 ft 2 in)
- Positions: Left back; centre back

Team information
- Current team: Drita
- Number: 32

Youth career
- 2011–2016: Skënderbeu

Senior career*
Years	Team	Apps	(Gls)
2016–2020	Skënderbeu Korçë	47	(0)
2020–2023	Varaždin	79	(1)
2022	→ Kukësi (loan)	17	(0)
2024–2025	Debrecen	16	(1)
2025–	Drita	32	(2)

International career^{‡}
2016	Albania U17	4	(0)
2018	Albania U19	4	(0)
2019–2021	Albania U21	15	(0)
- * Club domestic league appearances and goals as of 22 June 2026 ‡ National team caps and goals as of 16 November 2021

Jorgo Pëllumbi (born 15 July 2000) is an Albanian professional footballer who plays as a centre back for Kosovar club FC Drita.

== Career ==
=== Skënderbeu ===
Pëllumbi is a graduate of the Skënderbeu youth academy. He made his league debut for the club on 19 May 2018 in a 3–1 away loss to Luftëtari. He was subbed on for Ali Sowe in the 64th minute.

=== NK Varaždin ===
In September 2020 Pëllumbi moved, along with his team-mate Agon Elezi, to NK Varaždin in Croatian First Football League.

=== Debreceni VSC ===
In January 2024, Debrecen announced the signing of Pëllumbi.

=== Drita ===
On 4 September 2025, Pëllumbi signed for Kosovar champions FC Drita ahead of their participation in the 2025-26 UEFA Conference League.

== Honours ==
Drita

- Kosovar Supercup: 2025

== Career statistics ==
=== Club ===
As of 13 December 2017

Club statistics
Club	Season	League			Cup		Europe (Note: Including continental competitions, such as UEFA Champions League and UEFA Europa League)		Other (Note: Including other competitions, such as Albanian Supercup)		Total	
Club	Season	Division	Apps	Goals	Apps	Goals	Apps	Goals	Apps	Goals	Apps	Goals
Skënderbeu	2016–17	Kategoria Superiore	—		1	0	—		—		1	0
Skënderbeu	2017–18	Kategoria Superiore	—		3	0	0	0	—		3	0
Skënderbeu	Total		—		4	0	0	0	—		4	0
Career total			—		4	0	0	0	—		4	0
