= Nestor El Maestro =

Serbian football manager (born 1983)

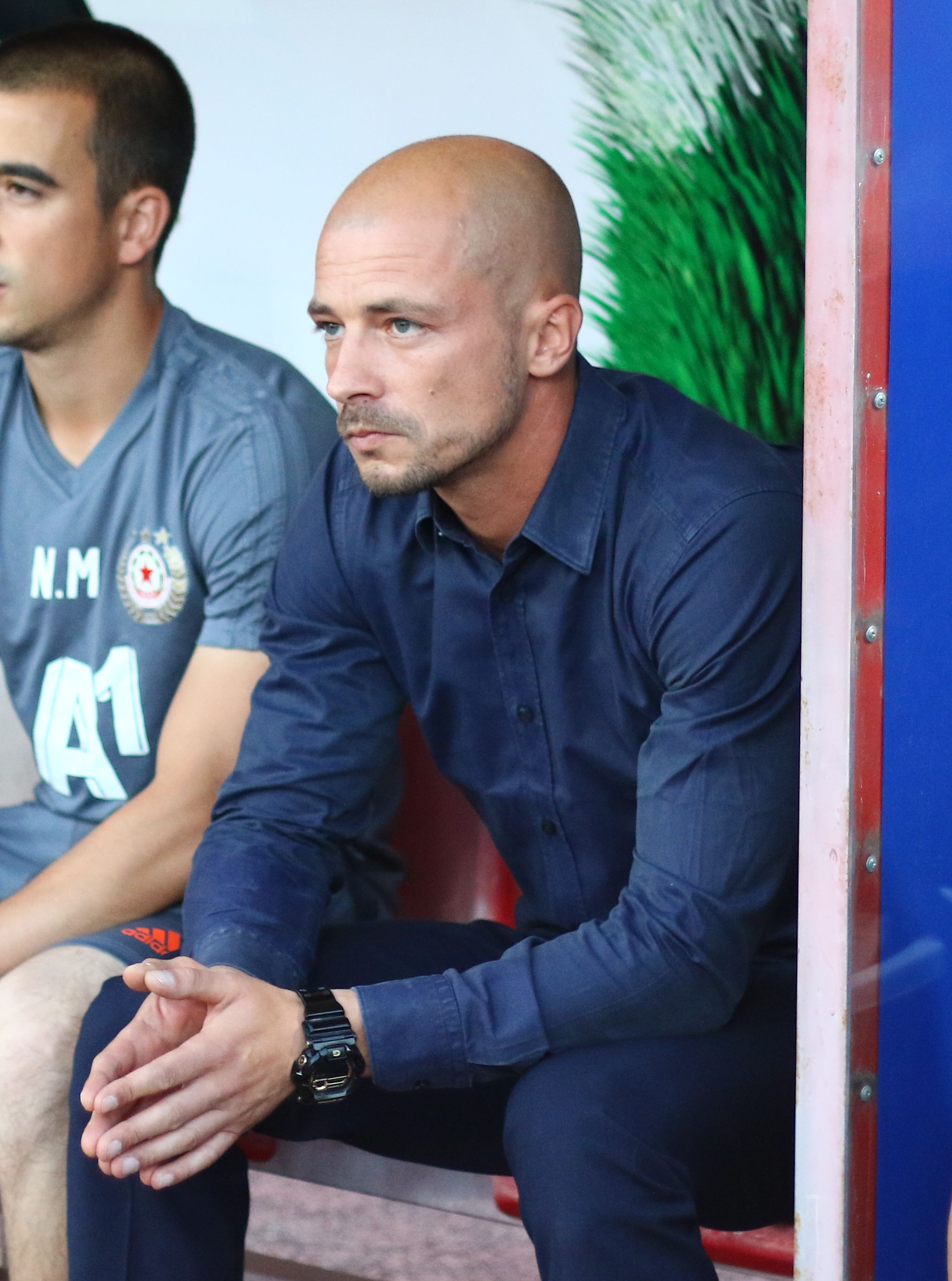
- Nestor El Maestro in 2018

Personal information
- Full name: Nestor El Maestro
- Birth name: Nestor Jevtić
- Date of birth: 25 March 1983 (age 43)
- Place of birth: Belgrade, SR Serbia, Yugoslavia

Managerial career
- Years: Team
- 2017–2018: Spartak Trnava
- 2018−2019: CSKA Sofia
- 2019−2020: Sturm Graz
- 2021: Al-Taawoun
- 2021–2022: Göztepe
- 2023–2024: CSKA Sofia
- 2024–2025: Debrecen
- 2026: Al-Najma
- 2026: Anorthosis Famagusta
- 2026–: Manisa

Nestor El Maestro (born Nestor Jevtić on 25 March 1983) is Yugoslav born English football manager. He is the current manager of TFF 1. Lig club Manisa.

== Personal life ==
El Maestro was born in Belgrade, Serbia, former Yugoslavia; his family emigrated to West Sussex, England. When El Maestro was eight years old, he changed his surname from Jevtić to El Maestro at the age of 18. He had changed it once before in his teenage years, due to himself identifying as solely British and in an attempt to distance himself from his surname ending with ić, and Serbian descent because of his native country's role in the Yugoslav Wars. He has a brother named Nikon.

== Managerial career ==
=== Spartak Trnava ===
In May 2017, El Maestro signed a two-year contract with Slovak club Spartak Trnava, taking over as their manager from the new season. In his first season as a manager, he led them to a historic league title for the first time in 45 years.

=== CSKA Sofia ===
In June 2018, he signed a contract with Bulgarian side CSKA Sofia. He was sacked in February 2019, despite reaching 45 points after 20 games in the Parva Liga.

=== Sturm Graz ===
On 12 June 2019, it was announced that El Maestro has signed a two-year contract with Austrian side Sturm Graz. He was sacked on 25 June 2020 after a series of seven losses in eight games. During the 29 games under El Maestro's tenure, the team reached a disappointing 37 points.

=== Al-Taawoun ===
On 12 March 2021, he was appointed as the manager of Saudi Pro League club Al-Taawoun. On 22 August 2021, he was sacked by Al-Taawoun.

=== Göztepe ===
On 8 September 2021, Süper Lig side Göztepe announced agreement with El Maestro, which was contracted on two seasons. After six defeats in a row, he was sacked on 7 March 2022 after six months.

=== CSKA Sofia (second stint) ===
On 29 July 2023, El Maestro was reappointed as manager of First League club CSKA Sofia, taking over from Saša Ilić. He was sacked on 14 April 2024 and was replaced by Stamen Belchev.

=== Debrecen ===
On 11 November 2024, Nemzeti Bajnokság side Debreceni VSC announced agreement with El Maestro, which was contracted until 30 June 2026. On 14 June 2025, he left the club by mutual consent. The supporters heavily criticized the management of Debrecen due to their decision.

== Managerial statistics ==
As of match played 26 October 2025

Record by team and tenure
Team	Nat	From	To	Record								Ref
Team	Nat	From	To	G	W	D	L	GF	GA	GD	Win %	Ref
Spartak Trnava	(Slovakia)	1 June 2017	7 June 2018	39	25	6	8	67	31	+36	64.10	
CSKA Sofia	(Bulgaria)	7 June 2018	8 February 2019	28	19	3	6	49	15	+34	67.86	
Sturm Graz	(Austria)	12 June 2019	25 June 2020	35	14	5	16	53	56	−3	40.00	
Al-Taawoun	(Saudi Arabia)	12 March 2021	22 August 2021	12	6	1	5	26	22	+4	50.00	
Göztepe	(Turkey)	8 September 2021	7 March 2022	29	9	5	15	39	44	−5	31.03	
CSKA Sofia	(Bulgaria)	29 July 2023	14 April 2024	30	19	5	6	48	21	+27	63.33	
Debrecen	(Hungary)	11 November 2024	14 June 2025	21	7	4	10	37	35	+2	33.33	
Al-Najma	(Saudi Arabia)	8 February 2026	30 June 2026	14	3	2	9	14	37	−23	21.43	
Anorthosis Famagusta	(Cyprus)	2 July 2026	19 October 2026	6	1	0	5	4	13	−9	16.67	
Manisa	(Turkey)	23 October 2026	Present	1	0	0	1	1	2	−1	0.00	
Total				216	103	31	82	338	276	+62	47.69	—

== Honours ==
=== Manager ===
Spartak Trnava

- Slovak Super Liga: 2017–18

Individual

- Slovak Super Liga Manager of the season: 2017–18

== See also ==
- Nikon El Maestro
