= Srđan Blagojević =

Serbian football manager

Personal information
- Date of birth: 6 June 1973 (age 53)
- Place of birth: Belgrade, SFR Yugoslavia

Team information
- Current team: Akron Tolyatti (head coach)

Managerial career
- Years: Team
- 2008–2010: Sremčica
- 2010–2011: Kovačevac
- 2012–2013: Srem Jakovo
- 2013: Žarkovo
- 2013–2014: Srem Jakovo
- 2014–2015: IMT
- 2015–2016: Bežanija
- 2016: Inđija
- 2016–2017: Javor Ivanjica
- 2017: Bežanija
- 2017–2019: Inđija
- 2020–2021: Caspiy
- 2021–2022: Astana
- 2022–2024: Debrecen
- 2025: Partizan
- 2026: Partizan
- 2026–: Akron Tolyatti

Srđan Blagojević (Serbian Cyrillic: Срђан Благојевић, born 6 June 1973) is a Serbian professional football manager who is the manager of Russian Premier League club Akron Tolyatti.

== Career ==
=== Astana ===
He was signed by FC Astana in November 2021. In September 2022, he was sacked from FC Astana due to changes in the management. FC Astana later won the 2022 Kazakhstan Premier League.

=== Debrecen ===
On 21 September 2022, he was signed by Nemzeti Bajnokság I club, Debreceni VSC. On 8 April 2023, he said in an interview with Magyar Nemzet that Debrecen's performance against Mezőkövesd was the best since his arrival. On 8 May 2023, in an interview with Hajdú-Bihar Vármegyei Portál, he said that Debrecen is fighting for the third place in the 2022–23 Nemzeti Bajnokság I season. On 17 May 2023, it was revealed on Nemzeti Sport that he might leave Debrecen.

On 28 May 2023, he signed a 2-year extension with the club. On 27 May 2023, he reached 3rd place with DVSC, that means that the club could get to the second round of the Europa Conference League qualifications.

On 26 August 2024, he was sacked after a 3-0 defeat from Újpest at the Szusza Ferenc Stadion. His team did not start the 2024–25 Nemzeti Bajnokság I as it was expected from the managerial board of Debrecen. Although Debrecen beat Győri ETO FC 3-0 on 2 August 2024, Debrecen drew with Kecskemét and lost to arch-rivals Diósgyőri VTK at the Nagyerdei Stadion on 17 August 2024.

=== Partizan ===
On 1 January 2025, Blagojević was appointed as the new coach of Partizan. He led the club through a tough financial period, relying mostly on young, homegrown players. He introduced a fast-paced, attractive brand of football that was welcomed by the fans, especially after a period in which the team struggled offensively. He was shockingly sacked by the board in November 2025 after two straight losses, one to second tier Mačva in the cup and a 4-1 loss to city rivals Čukarički. He was reappointed to the position on 9 May 2026 after a bad period under new managers Nenad Stojaković and Damir Čakar.

=== Akron Tolyatti ===
On 8 June 2026, Blagojević signed a four-year contract with Akron Tolyatti of the Russian Premier League.

== Managerial statistics ==
As of 21 November 2026

Managerial record by team and tenure
Club	From	To	Record				
Club	From	To	P	W	D	L	Win %
Bežanija	2 July 2015	22 September 2016	38	13	14	11	34.21
Inđija	20 September 2016	24 December 2016	8	5	1	2	62.50
Javor Ivanjica	25 December 2016	10 April 2017	8	2	1	5	25.00
Bežanija	30 August 2017	25 September 2017	3	0	0	3	0.00
Inđija	23 October 2017	21 October 2019	75	34	15	26	45.33
Caspiy	15 January 2020	20 November 2021	53	17	12	24	32.08
FC Astana	21 November 2021	13 September 2022	28	15	7	6	53.57
Debreceni VSC	21 September 2022	26 August 2024	62	29	12	21	46.77
Partizan	January 2025	Novembar 2025	39	24	7	8	61.54
Partizan	March 2026	June 2026	12	5	5	2	41.67
Akron Tolyatti	July 2026	Present	20	3	8	9	15.00
Total			346	147	82	117	42.49
