= 2023–24 Zalaegerszegi TE season =

Zalaegerszeg
2023–24 season
- Chairman: Gábor Végh
- Manager: Gábor Boér (until 12 November); Gábor Márton (from 13 November)
- Stadium: ZTE Arena
- Nemzeti Bajnokság I: 9th
- Magyar Kupa: Round of 16
- UEFA Europa Conference League: Second qualifying round
Home colours	Away colours

The 2023–24 season is Zalaegerszegi Torna Egylet's 43rd competitive season, 5th consecutive season in the Nemzeti Bajnokság I and 103rd year in existence as a football club. In addition to the domestic league, Zalaegerszeg participate in this season's editions of the Magyar Kupa and UEFA Europa Conference League where they earned their chance to qualify by winning the previous season's Magyar Kupa final.

== First team squad ==
As of 28 September 2023

Note: Flags indicate national team as defined under FIFA eligibility rules; some limited exceptions apply. Players may hold more than one non-FIFA nationality.

No.	Pos.	Nation	Player
1	GK	HUN	Dávid Dombó
4	DF	CRO	Zoran Lesjak
5	DF	HUN	Bence Várkonyi (on loan from MTK)
6	MF	HUN	Gergely Mim (on loan from Puskás Akadémia)
7	DF	CRO	Josip Špoljarić
8	MF	HUN	István Soltész
9	FW	HUN	Máté Sajbán
10	MF	FRA	Yohan Croizet (on loan from Újpest)
11	MF	HUN	Norbert Szendrei (captain)
14	MF	HUN	Barnabás Kovács
17	DF	HUN	András Huszti
18	MF	CRO	Bojan Sanković
19	FW	CRO	Antonio Mance
21	DF	HUN	Dániel Csóka
23	FW	MKD	Daniel Milovanovikj

No.	Pos.	Nation	Player
26	DF	HUN	Péter Tullner
27	MF	HUN	Bence Bedi
29	FW	NGR	Philip Baloteli
30	DF	MKD	Todor Todoroski
32	DF	SVK	Sinan Medgyes
33	DF	UKR	Oleksandr Safronov
41	DF	GRE	Stefanos Evangelou (on loan from Osijek)
55	GK	HUN	Zsombor Senkó
70	FW	NGR	Meshack Ubochioma
71	MF	HUN	Dominik Csóka
77	FW	HUN	Szabolcs Szalay
80	FW	HUN	Milán Klausz
95	GK	HUN	Márton Gyurján
97	FW	HUN	Dániel Németh

== Transfers ==
=== Summer ===
In: Note: Flags indicate national team as defined under FIFA eligibility rules; some limited exceptions apply. Players may hold more than one non-FIFA nationality.

No.	Pos.	Nation	Player
55	GK	HUN	Zsombor Senkó (from Diósgyőr)

Out: Note: Flags indicate national team as defined under FIFA eligibility rules; some limited exceptions apply. Players may hold more than one non-FIFA nationality.

No.	Pos.	Nation	Player
1	GK	HUN	Patrik Demjén (to MTK)

== Pre-season and friendlies ==
29 June 2023 Friendly	Bohemians 1905 (Czech Republic)	1–0	(Hungary) Zalaegerszeg	Ptuj, Slovenia
17:30 CEST (UTC+2)	Mužík 85'	Report

2 July 2023 Friendly	Dinamo București (Romania)	0–1	(Hungary) Zalaegerszeg	Zreče, Slovenia
18:00 CEST (UTC+2)		Report	Milovanovikj 87'

6 July 2023 Friendly	Gyirmót	1–2	Zalaegerszeg	Győr
18:00 CEST (UTC+2)	Kichun 40'	Report	Szendrei 43'; Klausz 87'	Stadium: Ménfői úti Stadion; Attendance: 0

15 July 2023 Friendly	Zalaegerszeg (Hungary)	3–2	(Germany) Union Berlin	Zalaegerszeg, Hungary
15:30 CEST (UTC+2)	Sajbán 1', 28'; Ubochioma 48'	Report	Kaufmann 45+1'; Aaronson 89'	Stadium: ZTE Arena

16 July 2023 Friendly	Zalaegerszeg (Hungary)	2–1	(Slovenia) Nafta	Zalaegerszeg, Hungary
CEST (UTC+2)	Do. Csóka 37'; Klausz 41'	Report	Oštrek 82'	Stadium: ZTE Arena

20 July 2023 Friendly	Zalaegerszeg (Hungary)	1–1	(Saudi Arabia) Al-Ettifaq	Zalaegerszeg, Hungary
17:30 CEST (UTC+2)	Ubochioma 13'	Report	Quaison 19'	Stadium: ZTE Arena; Attendance: 1,200; Referee: Gábor Iványi

== Competitions ==
=== Overview ===
Competition	First match	Last match	Starting round	Final position	Record							
Competition	First match	Last match	Starting round	Final position	Pld	W	D	L	GF	GA	GD	Win %
Nemzeti Bajnokság I	30 July 2023	25 May 2024	Matchday 1	TBA	21	7	4	10	30	41	−11	33.33
Magyar Kupa	16 September 2023	TBA	Round of 64	TBA	2	2	0	0	6	1	+5	100.00
UEFA Europa Conference League	27 July 2023	3 August 2024	Second qualifying round	Second qualifying round	2	0	0	2	1	3	−2	0.00
Total					25	9	4	12	37	45	−8	36.00

Last updated: 17 February 2024
Source: Competitions

=== Nemzeti Bajnokság I ===
==== League table ====
Pos	Team	Pld	W	D	L	GF	GA	GD	Pts	Qualification or relegation
7	Diósgyőr	33	12	9	12	50	56	−6	45	
8	MTK	33	12	8	13	43	62	−19	44	
9	Zalaegerszeg	33	12	7	14	54	60	−6	43	
10	Újpest	33	11	4	18	45	67	−22	37	
11	Kisvárda (R)	33	9	4	20	40	55	−15	31	Relegation to the Nemzeti Bajnokság II

Source: Hungarian Football Federation (in Hungarian), Soccerway
Rules for classification: 1) Points; 2) Matches won; 3) Goal difference; 4) Goals scored; 5) Head-to-head points; 6) Head-to-head goal difference; 7) Fair play ranking; 8) Drawing of lots.
(R) Relegated

==== Results summary ====
Overall								Home						Away					
Pld	W	D	L	GF	GA	GD	Pts	W	D	L	GF	GA	GD	W	D	L	GF	GA	GD
21	7	4	10	30	41	−11	25	2	3	5	14	23	−9	5	1	5	16	18	−2

Last updated: 17 February 2024.
Source: Soccerway

==== Results by round ====
Round	1	2	3	4	5	6	7	8	9	10	11	12	13	14	15	16	17	18	19	20	21	22	23	24	25	26	27	28	29	30	31	32	33
Ground	H	H	A	H	A	H	A	H	A	H	A	A	A	H	A	H	A	H	A	H	A	H	A	H	A	H	A	H	A	H	A	H	A
Result	L	W	L	L	L	L	D	D	W	L	L	W	L	L	W	D	L	W	W	D	W	W	L	D	L	W	W	L	D	W	W	D	L
Position	12	9	9	10	11	11	12	10	10	10	10	10	10	11	11	10	11	10	9	10	9	9	9	10	10	10	8	8	9	8	7	7	9

Updated to match(es) played on 18 February 2024. Source: Matches
A = Away; H = Home; W = Win; D = Draw; L = Loss

==== Matches ====
30 July 2023 1	Zalaegerszeg	0–2	Kisvárda	Zalaegerszeg
20:00 CEST (UTC+2)	Tajti (yellow card) 48'; Huszti (yellow card) 65'; Csóka (yellow card) 76'	Report	Mešanović 7', 15'; Vida (yellow card) 45+2'; Széles (yellow card) 52'	Stadium: ZTE Arena; Attendance: 2,314; Referee: Sándor Andó-Szabó

6 August 2023 2	Zalaegerszeg	2–1	MTK	Zalaegerszeg
20:00 CEST (UTC+2)	Sajbán 3'; Safronov (yellow card) 15'; Tajti 45+4' (pen.)	Report	Németh 32'; Zsóri (yellow card) 65'; Kosznovszky (yellow card) 90+4'; Kádár (yellow card) 90+10'	Stadium: ZTE Arena; Attendance: 1,823; Referee: Dr Bence Csonka

13 August 2023 3	Debrecen	1–0	Zalaegerszeg	Debrecen
16:30 CEST (UTC+2)	Kyziridis 83', (yellow card) 90+5'	Report	Milovanovikj (yellow card) 28'; Gergényi (yellow card) 88'; Ikoba (yellow card) 90+2'	Stadium: Nagyerdei Stadion; Attendance: 5,011; Referee: István Vad

18 August 2023 4	Zalaegerszeg	1–3	Diósgyőr	Zalaegerszeg
20:15 CEST (UTC+2)	Gergényi (yellow card) 40'; Tajti (yellow card) 61'; Szendrei 86'	Report	Stephen 26'; Edomwonyi (yellow card) 61'; Lukács 71'; Pernambuco 89'	Stadium: ZTE Arena; Attendance: 2,792; Referee: Csaba Pintér

26 August 2023 5	Újpest	2–1	Zalaegerszeg	Budapest
20:00 CEST (UTC+2)	Csoboth 2'; Kastrati (yellow card) 30'; Tóth (yellow card) 33'; Ambrose 61'; Ljujić (yellow card) 84'	Report	B. Kovács (yellow card) 15'; Szendrei (yellow card) 35'; Mim 60'; Bedi (yellow card) 81'	Stadium: Szusza Ferenc Stadion; Attendance: 4,003; Referee: Ádám Farkas

3 September 2023 6	Zalaegerszeg	2–6	Ferencváros	Zalaegerszeg
17:15 CEST (UTC+2)	Mance 4'; Mim 19'; Bedi (yellow card) 36'; Lesjak (yellow card) 84'	Report	B. Varga 27' (pen.), 37' (pen.), 51'; Traoré 38', 86' (pen.); Cissé (yellow card) 42'; Ben Romdhane (yellow card) 48'; Zachariassen 90'	Stadium: ZTE Arena; Attendance: 5,313; Referee: József Erdős

24 September 2023 7	Fehérvár	3–3	Zalaegerszeg	Székesfehérvár
15:00 CEST (UTC+2)	Karamoko 34'; Fiola (red card) 60'; Csongvai (yellow card) 60'; Kalmár 64', (yellow card) 81'; L. Szabó (yellow card) 90+8', (goal) 90+9'	Report	Medgyes (yellow card) 20'; Croizet 46'; Evangelou 72'; Špoljarić 80' (pen.); Todoroski (yellow card) 90'	Stadium: Sóstói Stadion; Attendance: 2,565; Referee: István Vad

29 September 2023 8	Zalaegerszeg	1–1	Puskás Akadémia	Zalaegerszeg
20:00 CEST (UTC+2)	Evangelou (yellow card) 56'; Mance (yellow card) 64'; Csóka (yellow card) 87'; Špoljarić 90+8'	Report	Ormonde-Ottewill (yellow card) 54'; Maceiras (yellow card) 76'; Plšek 88' (pen.); Nagy (yellow card) 90+5'	Stadium: ZTE Arena; Attendance: 2,872; Referee: Sándor Andó-Szabó

7 October 2023 9	Mezőkövesd	1–2	Zalaegerszeg	Mezőkövesd
12:45 CEST (UTC+2)	Evangelou 67' (o.g.); Cseke (yellow card) 80'; Brtan (yellow card) 90'; K. Kállai (yellow card) 90+6'	Report	Mance 34', 85'	Stadium: Városi Stadion; Attendance: 1,200; Referee: Csaba Pintér

21 October 2023 10	Zalaegerszeg	2–5	Paks	Zalaegerszeg
14:45 CEST (UTC+2)	Mance 44', 45+3' (pen.)	Report	Beke (yellow card) 7'; Windecker 32', 43'; Skribek 39'; Silye (yellow card) 45+2'; Hahn 50'; K. Kovács (yellow card) 56'; J. Szabó 59'; Papp (yellow card) 66'	Stadium: ZTE Arena; Attendance: 3,277; Referee: József Erdős

28 October 2023 11	Kecskemét	3–1	Zalaegerszeg	Kecskemét
12:30 CEST (UTC+2)	Szuhodovszki (yellow card) 17'; Tóth (yellow card) 27', (goal) 35'; A. Szabó 45+4'; Leoni (yellow card) 57'; Zeke 73'	Report	Csóka (yellow card) 9'; Safronov (yellow card) 45+2'; Mance 82' (pen.); Huszti (yellow card) 87'	Stadium: Széktói Stadion; Attendance: 2,487; Referee: Márton Rúsz

5 November 2023 12	Kisvárda	0–1	Zalaegerszeg	Kisvárda
12:30 CET (UTC+1)	Ötvös (yellow card) 4'; Melnyk (yellow card) 85'	Report	Todoroski (yellow card) 7'; Medgyes (yellow card) 41'; Sajbán 74'; Ubochioma (yellow card) 90+2'	Stadium: Várkerti Stadion; Attendance: 1,820; Referee: Tamás Bognár

10 November 2023 13	MTK	2–0	Zalaegerszeg	Budapest
20:00 CET (UTC+1)	M. Kovács (yellow card) 17'; Kocsis 60'; Thiam 78'	Report	Huszti (yellow card) 44'	Stadium: Hidegkuti Nándor Stadion; Attendance: Referee: Mihály Káprály

25 November 2023 14	Zalaegerszeg	1–2	Debrecen	Zalaegerszeg
17:00 CET (UTC+1)	Mance (yellow card) 26'; Croizet 38'; Evangelou (yellow card) 45'	Report	Bárány (yellow card) 34'; Vajda (yellow card) 44'; Dzsudzsák 56'; Várkonyi 68' (o.g.); Oliveira (yellow card) 90+4'	Stadium: ZTE Arena; Attendance: 1,914; Referee: Sándor Andó-Szabó

3 December 2023 15	Diósgyőr	0–3	Zalaegerszeg	Miskolc
15:15 CET (UTC+1)	Stephen (yellow card) 87'	Report	Németh (yellow card) 2'; Medgyes (yellow card) 22'; Mim 65', 74', (yellow card) 74'; Ubochioma 90+3'	Stadium: DVTK Stadion; Attendance: 3,652; Referee: István Vad

9 December 2023 16	Zalaegerszeg	1–1	Újpest	Zalaegerszeg
15:45 CET (UTC+1)	Mim (yellow card) 37'; Medgyes 86'	Report	Ambrose 50'; Jevtoski (yellow card) 80'; Kiss (yellow card) 83'; Csoboth (yellow card) 90'	Stadium: ZTE Arena; Attendance: 1,755; Referee: Gergő Bogár

17 December 2023 17	Ferencváros	3–0	Zalaegerszeg	Budapest
16:00 CET (UTC+1)	Lisztes 50', (yellow card) 88'; Aaneba 77'; Ben Romdhane 87'	Report	Evangelou (yellow card) 39'	Stadium: Groupama Arena; Attendance: 7,017; Referee: Mihály Káprály

3 February 2024 18	Zalaegerszeg	3–1	Fehérvár	Zalaegerszeg
12:30 CET (UTC+1)	Mance 8', 45+2'; Bedi (yellow card) 57'; Márton (not on pitch) (yellow card) 57'; Várkonyi (yellow card) 72'; Croizet 86'	Report	T. Tóth (yellow card) 29'; Csongvai 73', (yellow card) 85'	Stadium: ZTE Arena; Attendance: 2,479; Referee: István Vad

7 February 2024 19	Puskás Akadémia	0–1	Zalaegerszeg	Felcsút
20:00 CET (UTC+1)		Report	Mance 15' (pen.)	Stadium: Pancho Aréna; Attendance: 1,234; Referee: József Erdős

11 February 2024 20	Zalaegerszeg	1–1	Mezőkövesd	Zalaegerszeg
19:45 CET (UTC+1)	Bedi 11'; Kiss (yellow card) 76'; Márton (not on pitch) (yellow card) 80'	Report	Lukić (yellow card) 34'; Beriashvili 68', (yellow card) 74'	Stadium: ZTE Arena; Attendance: 1,198; Referee: Mihály Káprály

16 February 2024 21	Paks	3–4	Zalaegerszeg	Paks
20:00 CET (UTC+1)	Evangelou 4' (o.g.); Könyves 47', 55'; B. Szabó (yellow card) 78'; Hahn (yellow card) 79'	Report	Kiss (yellow card) 15'; Gruber 53'; Evangelou (yellow card) 61'; Croizet 66', 90+1'; Mance 73'; Mim (yellow card) 90+3'	Stadium: Fehérvári úti Stadion; Attendance: 1,600; Referee: Gergő Bogár

2 March 2024 22	Zalaegerszeg	3–1	Kecskemét	Zalaegerszeg
CET (UTC+1)				Stadium: ZTE Arena; Attendance: 2,588; Referee: B. Csonka

9 March 2024 23	Kisvárda	1–0	Zalaegerszeg	Kisvárda
CET (UTC+1)				Stadium: Várkerti Stadion; Attendance: 1,585; Referee: J. Erdős

16 March 2024 24	Zalaegerszeg	2–2	MTK	Zalaegerszeg
CET (UTC+1)				Stadium: ZTE Arena; Attendance: 2,124; Referee: M. Rúsz

30 March 2024 25	Debrecen	5–1	Zalaegerszeg	Debrecen
CET (UTC+1)				Stadium: Nagyerdei Stadion; Attendance: 4,002; Referee: P. Antal

6 April 2024 26	Zalaegerszeg	5–1	Diósgyőr	Zalaegerszeg
CEST (UTC+2)				Stadium: ZTE Arena; Attendance: 3,310; Referee: T. Bognár

13 April 2024 27	Újpest	1–5	Zalaegerszeg	Budapest
CEST (UTC+2)				Stadium: Szusza Ferenc Stadion

20 April 2024 28	Zalaegerszeg	2–3	Ferencváros	Zalaegerszeg
CEST (UTC+2)				Stadium: ZTE Arena

27 April 2024 29	Fehérvár	1–1	Zalaegerszeg	Székesfehérvár
CEST (UTC+2)				Stadium: Sóstói Stadion

4 May 2024 30	Zalaegerszeg	1–0	Puskás Akadémia	Zalaegerszeg
CEST (UTC+2)				Stadium: ZTE Arena

11 May 2024 31	Mezőkövesd	1–2	Zalaegerszeg	Mezőkövesd
CEST (UTC+2)				Stadium: Városi Stadion

18 May 2024 32	Zalaegerszeg	1–1	Paks	Zalaegerszeg
CEST (UTC+2)				Stadium: ZTE Arena

25 May 2024 33	Kecskemét	2–1	Zalaegerszeg	Kecskemét
CEST (UTC+2)				Stadium: Széktói Stadion

=== Magyar Kupa ===
The draw for the round of 64 was held on 28 August 2023.

16 September 2023 Round of 64	Cigánd	0–4	Zalaegerszeg	Cigánd
15:00 CEST (UTC+2)	Girdán (yellow card) 45'	Report	Mance 15'; Croizet 44'; Szendrei 48'; Sajbán 90'	Stadium: Cigándi Sportpálya; Attendance: 800; Referee: Márk Szigetvári

1 November 2023 Round of 32	Haladás	1–2	Zalaegerszeg	Szombathely
17:15 CET (UTC+1)	R. Horváth 26', (red card) 83'; Bošnjak (yellow card) 35'; Zvekanov (yellow card) 90'	Report	Ubochioma 16', (red card) 85'; Croizet 21', (yellow card) 90+2'; Huszti (yellow card) 39'; Szendrei (yellow card) 47'; Sanković (yellow card) 57'	Stadium: Haladás Sportkomplexum; Attendance: 6,786; Referee: Gergő Bogár

27 February 2024 Round of 16	Diósgyőr	4–2	Zalaegerszeg	Miskolc
17:30 CET (UTC+1)				Stadium: DVTK Stadion

=== UEFA Europa Conference League ===
==== Second qualifying round ====
27 July 2023 First leg	Osijek (Croatia)	1–0	(Hungary) Zalaegerszeg	Osijek, Croatia
20:00 CEST (UTC+2)	Miérez (yellow card) 50', (goal) 90+1'; Bukvić (yellow card) 80'	Report	Ubochioma (yellow card) 48'; Tajti (yellow card) 53'	Stadium: Opus Arena; Attendance: 12,011; Referee: Bastian Dankert (Germany)

3 August 2023 Second leg	Zalaegerszeg (Hungary)	1–2 (1–3 agg.)	(Croatia) Osijek	Zalaegerszeg, Hungary
18:45 CEST (UTC+2)	Boér (not on pitch) (yellow card) 9'; Ikoba (yellow card) 42', (goal) 82'; Huszti (yellow card) 63'; Gergényi (yellow card) 70'; Mocsi (yellow card) 84'	Report	Gergényi 9' (o.g.); Mkrtchyan (yellow card) 72'; Špoljarić 73'; Malenica (yellow card) 90'; Brlek (yellow card) 90+7'	Stadium: ZTE Arena; Attendance: 5,347; Referee: Gal Leibovitz (Israel)
Note: Osijek won 3–1 on aggregate.

== Squad statistics ==
Last updated on 17 February 2024.

No.	Pos.	Name	League		Cup		Europe		Total		Discipline	
No.	Pos.	Name	Apps	Goals	Apps	Goals	Apps	Goals	Apps	Goals	Yellow card	Red card
1	GK	(Hungary) Dávid Dombó	11	0	1	0	0	0	12	0	0	0
4	DF	(Croatia) Zoran Lesjak	3(2)	0	0	0	0	0	3(2)	0	1	0
5	DF	(Hungary) Bence Várkonyi	9	0	1	0	0	0	10	0	1	0
6	FW	(Hungary) Gergely Mim	13(4)	4	1	0	0	0	14(4)	4	3	0
7	FW	(Croatia) Josip Špoljarić	2(6)	2	1	0	0	0	3(6)	2	0	0
8	MF	(Hungary) István Soltész	2(2)	0	0(1)	0	0	0	2(3)	0	0	0
9	FW	(Hungary) Máté Sajbán	13(5)	2	0(2)	1	2	0	15(7)	3	0	0
10	MF	(France) Yohan Croizet	9(6)	5	2	2	0	0	11(6)	7	1	0
10	MF	(Hungary) Mátyás Tajti	3(2)	1	0	0	2	0	5(2)	1	3	0
11	MF	(Hungary) Norbert Szendrei	15(1)	1	2	1	2	0	19(1)	2	2	0
12	FW	(United States) Eduvie Ikoba	3(1)	0	0	0	0(2)	1	3(3)	1	2	0
14	MF	(Hungary) Barnabás Kovács	4(5)	0	0	0	0(2)	0	4(7)	0	1	0
17	DF	(Hungary) András Huszti	10(5)	0	2	0	2	0	14(5)	0	5	0
18	MF	(Montenegro) Bojan Sanković	18(1)	0	2	0	2	0	22(1)	0	1	0
19	FW	(Croatia) Antonio Mance	13(2)	10	2	1	0	0	15(2)	11	2	0
21	DF	(Hungary) Dániel Csóka	12(2)	0	2	0	0(1)	0	14(3)	0	3	0
23	MF	(Israel) Guy Hadida	0(1)	0	0	0	0	0	0(1)	0	0	0
23	MF	(North Macedonia) Daniel Milovanovikj	1(1)	0	0	0	0(1)	0	1(2)	0	1	0
26	DF	(Hungary) Péter Tullner	0	0	0	0	0	0	0	0	0	0
27	MF	(Hungary) Bence Bedi	18	1	1(1)	0	0(1)	0	19(2)	1	3	0
29	FW	(Nigeria) Christopher Baloteli	0	0	0	0	0	0	0	0	0	0
30	FW	(Hungary) Zsombor Gruber	1	1	0	0	0	0	1	1	0	0
30	DF	(North Macedonia) Todor Todoroski	3(2)	0	0(1)	0	0	0	3(3)	0	2	0
32	DF	(Slovakia) Sinan Medgyes	12	1	1	0	0	0	13	1	3	0
33	DF	(Ukraine) Oleksandr Safronov	12	0	0	0	2	0	14	0	2	0
37	DF	(Hungary) Attila Mocsi	4	0	0	0	2	0	6	0	1	0
41	DF	(Greece) Stefanos Evangelou	15	1	1	0	0	0	16	1	4	0
44	DF	(Hungary) Bence Gergényi	2(3)	0	0	0	2	0	4(3)	0	3	0
49	MF	(Hungary) Bence Kiss	3(1)	0	0	0	0	0	3(1)	0	2	0
55	GK	(Hungary) Zsombor Senkó	6(1)	0	1	0	0	0	7(1)	0	0	0
70	FW	(Nigeria) Meshack Ubochioma	2(11)	1	1(1)	1	2	0	5(12)	2	2	1
71	FW	(Hungary) Dominik Csóka	0	0	0	0	0	0	0	0	0	0
77	FW	(Hungary) Szabolcs Szalay	2(8)	0	1(1)	0	2	0	5(9)	0	0	0
80	FW	(Hungary) Milán Klausz	0(6)	0	0	0	0(1)	0	0(7)	0	0	0
95	GK	(Hungary) Márton Gyurján	4	0	0	0	2	0	6	0	0	0
97	FW	(Hungary) Dániel Németh	6(8)	0	0(2)	0	0(1)	0	6(11)	0	1	0
Own goals			—	0	—	0	—	0	—	0	N/A	
