= 2022–23 Zalaegerszegi TE season =

Zalaegerszeg
2022–23 season
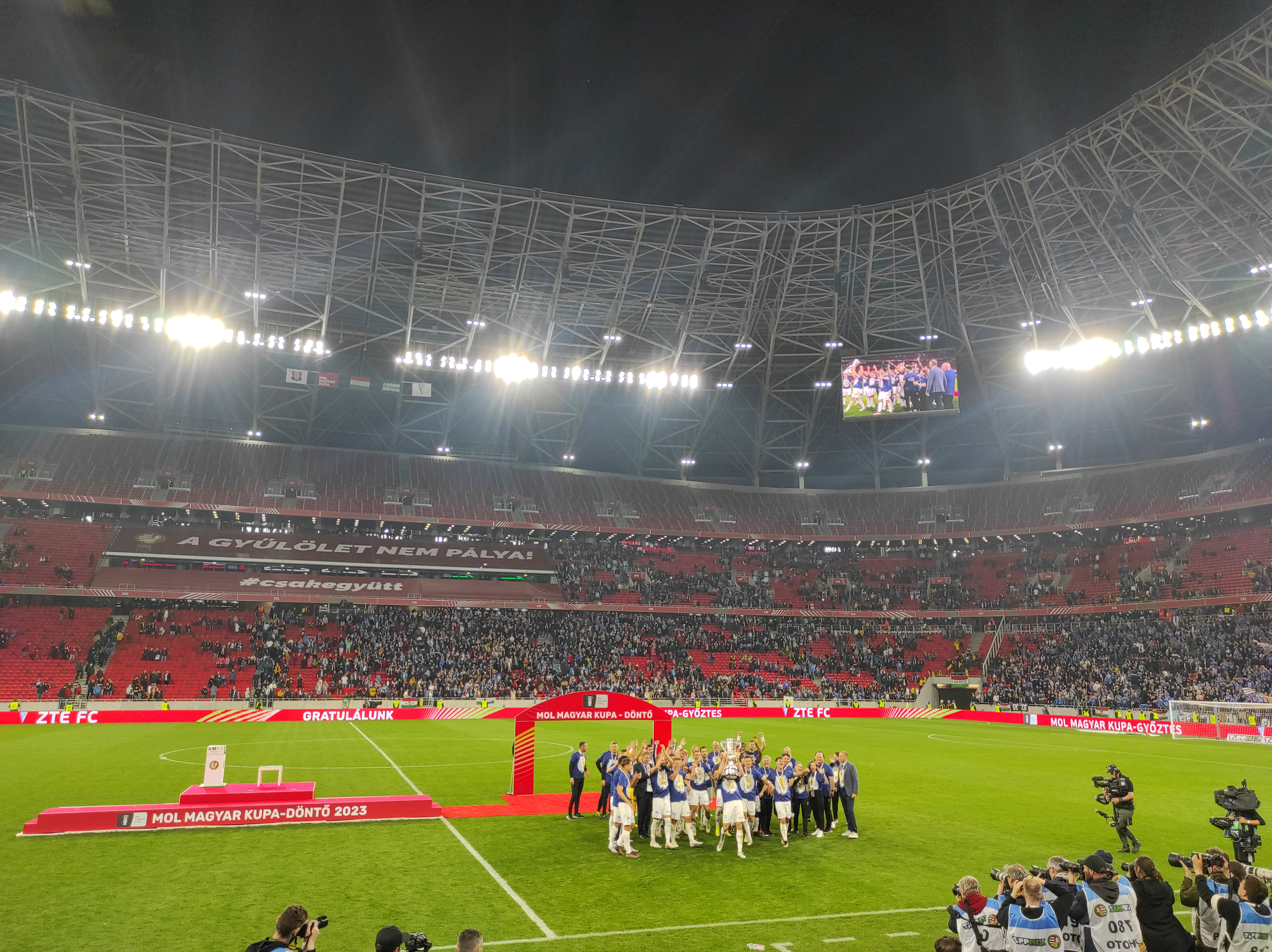
- Zalaegerszeg players celebrating their Magyar Kupa victory
- Chairman: Gábor Végh
- Manager: Ricardo Moniz (until 24 April); Gábor Boér (from 24 April)
- Stadium: ZTE Arena
- Nemzeti Bajnokság I: 9th
- Magyar Kupa: Winners
- Top goalscorer: League: Eduvie Ikoba (10); All: Eduvie Ikoba (12)
- Highest home attendance: 5,514 vs Ferencváros (24 January 2023); Nemzeti Bajnokság I
- Lowest home attendance: 1,893 vs Mezőkövesd (5 February 2023); Nemzeti Bajnokság I
- Average home league attendance: 2,599
- Biggest win: 5–0 vs Mezőkövesd (A) (2 September 2022); Nemzeti Bajnokság I
- Biggest defeat: 0–3 vs Debrecen (A) (28 January 2023); Nemzeti Bajnokság I
| Home colours | Away colours | Third colours |
- All statistics correct as of 20 March 2023.

The 2022–23 season was Zalaegerszegi Torna Egylet's 4th competitive season, 42nd consecutive season in the Nemzeti Bajnokság I and 102nd year in existence as a football club. In addition to the domestic league, Zalaegerszeg participated in this season's editions of the Magyar Kupa.

Ricardo Moniz had guided the club to the Magyar Kupa final, where they would face Budafok. However, because of the dropped form in the league, he was sacked on 24 April 2023, and replaced by former manager Gábor Boér as head coach until the end of the season. Boér's first game in charge was against Mezőkövesd at away, which Zalaegerszeg won. The next game was the Magyar Kupa final on 3 May, where the club prevailed 2–0 after extra time, claiming their first Magyar Kupa title in history against the second division team.

== Kits ==
The pattern on the jersey represents the city of Zalaegerszeg.

| Home | Away | Third | Goalkeeper |

== First-team squad ==
Note: Flags indicate national team as defined under FIFA eligibility rules; some limited exceptions apply. Players may hold more than one non-FIFA nationality.

| No. | Pos. | Nation | Player |
|---|---|---|---|
| 1 | GK | HUN | Patrik Demjén |
| 3 | DF | HUN | Dávid Kálnoki-Kis (captain) |
| 4 | DF | CRO | Zoran Lesjak |
| 6 | MF | HUN | Gergely Mim |
| 7 | FW | ALB | Eros Grezda |
| 9 | FW | COD | Christy Manzinga |
| 10 | MF | HUN | Mátyás Tajti |
| 11 | MF | HUN | Norbert Szendrei |
| 12 | FW | USA | Eduvie Ikoba |
| 14 | MF | HUN | Barnabás Kovács |
| 17 | DF | HUN | András Huszti |
| 18 | MF | MNE | Bojan Sanković |

| No. | Pos. | Nation | Player |
|---|---|---|---|
| 21 | DF | HUN | Dániel Csóka |
| 27 | MF | HUN | Bence Bedi |
| 29 | FW | NGR | Christopher Baloteli |
| 33 | DF | UKR | Oleksandr Safronov |
| 37 | DF | HUN | Attila Mocsi |
| 44 | DF | HUN | Bence Gergényi |
| 70 | MF | NGR | Meshack Ubochioma |
| 77 | FW | HUN | Szabolcs Szalay |
| 80 | FW | HUN | Milán Klausz |
| 95 | GK | HUN | Márton Gyurján |
| 97 | FW | HUN | Dániel Németh |

== Transfers ==
=== Summer ===
In: Note: Flags indicate national team as defined under FIFA eligibility rules; some limited exceptions apply. Players may hold more than one non-FIFA nationality.

| No. | Pos. | Nation | Player |
|---|---|---|---|
| 5 | DF | ROU | Botond Gergely (from (Romania) Csikszereda) |
| 6 | MF | HUN | Gergely Mim (loan from Puskás Akadémia) |
| 7 | FW | HUN | Milán Májer (from Budapest Honvéd) |
| 9 | FW | COD | Christy Manzinga (from (Northern Ireland) Linfield) |
| 11 | MF | HUN | Norbert Szendrei (from Fehérvár) |
| 12 | FW | USA | Eduvie Ikoba (from (Slovakia) Trenčín) |
| 13 | DF | HUN | Martin Majnovics (loan return from (Austria) Horn) |
| 14 | MF | HUN | Barnabás Kovács (loan return from Tiszakécske) |
| 16 | FW | HUN | Dávid Zimonyi (loan return from Vasas) |
| 17 | DF | HUN | András Huszti (from Puskás Akadémia) |
| 19 | FW | BRA | Diego Carioca (loan from (Ukraine) Kolos Kovalivka) |
| 21 | DF | HUN | Dániel Csóka (from (England) Wimbledon) |
| 28 | DF | HUN | Erik Németh (loan return from (Slovenia) Nafta Lendava) |
| 30 | MF | HUN | Zsombor Boros (from Vasas) |
| 33 | DF | UKR | Oleksandr Safronov (from (Slovenia) Nafta Lendava) |
| 80 | FW | HUN | Milán Klausz (from Győr) |
| 97 | FW | HUN | Dániel Németh (loan return from (Slovenia) Nafta Lendava) |
| — | DF | HUN | Bence Szabó (loan return from (Slovenia) Nafta Lendava) |
| — | MF | HUN | Dániel Szökrönyös (loan return from Kecskemét) |

Out: Note: Flags indicate national team as defined under FIFA eligibility rules; some limited exceptions apply. Players may hold more than one non-FIFA nationality.

| No. | Pos. | Nation | Player |
|---|---|---|---|
| 5 | DF | HUN | Dávid Bobál (to Mezőkövesd) |
| 7 | FW | HUN | Dániel Zsóri (loan return to Fehérvár) |
| 11 | MF | CRO | Šime Gržan (loan return to (Croatia) Osijek) |
| 13 | DF | HUN | Martin Majnovics (End of contract) |
| 16 | FW | HUN | Dávid Zimonyi (to Vasas) |
| 17 | DF | HUN | András Huszti (loan return to Puskás Akadémia) |
| 21 | MF | BIH | Emir Halilović (to (Bosnia and Herzegovina) Velež Mostar) |
| 23 | FW | MKD | Daniel Milovanovikj (loan to (North Macedonia) Tikves) |
| 24 | DF | HUN | László Papp (loan to (Slovenia) Nafta Lendava) |
| 28 | DF | HUN | Erik Németh (loan to Szentlőrinc) |
| 31 | DF | MKD | Nikola Serafimov (to Fehérvár) |
| 46 | GK | HUN | Bence Köcse (to Kelen) |
| 50 | FW | CRO | Josip Špoljarić (loan return to (Croatia) Osijek) |
| 57 | MF | ROU | Liviu Antal (loan return to Szombathelyi Haladás) |
| 68 | MF | HUN | Ádám Halmai (loan return to Fehérvár) |
| 71 | MF | HUN | Patrik Posztobányi (loan return to Puskás Akadémia) |
| 72 | DF | SLO | Mihael Rebernik (loan return to (Slovenia) Nafta Lendava) |
| — | DF | HUN | Bence Szabó (to (Slovenia) Nafta Lendava) |
| — | MF | HUN | Dániel Szökrönyös (to Nagykanizsa) |

=== Winter ===
In: Note: Flags indicate national team as defined under FIFA eligibility rules; some limited exceptions apply. Players may hold more than one non-FIFA nationality.

| No. | Pos. | Nation | Player |
|---|---|---|---|
| — | MF | HUN | Bence Balabás (from Austria Wien) |
| 7 | FW | ALB | Eros Grezda (from (Turkey) Manisa) |
| 28 | DF | HUN | Erik Németh (loan return from Szentlőrinc) |

Out: Note: Flags indicate national team as defined under FIFA eligibility rules; some limited exceptions apply. Players may hold more than one non-FIFA nationality.

| No. | Pos. | Nation | Player |
|---|---|---|---|
| 7 | MF | HUN | Milán Májer (to Kecskemét) |
| 19 | FW | BRA | Diego Carioca (loan return to (Ukraine) Kolos Kovalivka) |
| 28 | DF | HUN | Erik Németh (loan to Soroksár) |

== Competitions ==
=== Overview ===
| Competition | First match | Last match | Starting round | Final position | Record | | | | | | | |
| Competition | First match | Last match | Starting round | Final position | Pld | W | D | L | GF | GA | GD | Win % |
|---|---|---|---|---|---|---|---|---|---|---|---|---|
| Nemzeti Bajnokság I | 29 July 2022 | 26 May 2023 | Matchday 1 | 9th | 33 | 10 | 9 | 14 | 37 | 43 | −6 | 30.30 |
| Magyar Kupa | 17 September 2022 | 3 May 2023 | Round of 64 | Winners | 6 | 6 | 0 | 0 | 13 | 1 | +12 | 100.00 |
| Total | | | | | 39 | 16 | 9 | 14 | 50 | 44 | +6 | 41.03 |

Source: Competitions

=== Nemzeti Bajnokság I ===
==== League table ====
| Pos | Team | Pld | W | D | L | GF | GA | GD | Pts | Qualification or relegation |
|---|---|---|---|---|---|---|---|---|---|---|
| 7 | Mezőkövesd | 33 | 11 | 9 | 13 | 40 | 43 | −3 | 42 | |
| 8 | Újpest | 33 | 11 | 8 | 14 | 42 | 55 | −13 | 41 | |
| 9 | Zalaegerszeg | 33 | 10 | 9 | 14 | 37 | 43 | −6 | 39 | Qualification for the Europa Conference League second qualifying round (Note: Zalaegerszeg qualified to the Europa Conference League second qualifying round as winners of the 2022–23 Magyar Kupa.) |
| 10 | Fehérvár | 33 | 8 | 11 | 14 | 38 | 43 | −5 | 35 | |
| 11 | Budapest Honvéd (R) | 33 | 8 | 9 | 16 | 34 | 51 | −17 | 33 | Relegation to the Nemzeti Bajnokság II |

Source: Hungarian Football Federation (in Hungarian), Soccerway
Rules for classification: 1) Points; 2) Matches won; 3) Goal difference; 4) Goals scored; 5) Head-to-head points; 6) Head-to-head goal difference; 7) Fair play ranking; 8) Drawing of lots.
(R) Relegated

==== Results summary ====
| Overall | | | | | | | | Home | | | | | | Away | | | | | |
| Pld | W | D | L | GF | GA | GD | Pts | W | D | L | GF | GA | GD | W | D | L | GF | GA | GD |
|---|---|---|---|---|---|---|---|---|---|---|---|---|---|---|---|---|---|---|---|
| 33 | 10 | 9 | 14 | 37 | 43 | −6 | 39 | 6 | 5 | 5 | 17 | 16 | +1 | 4 | 4 | 9 | 20 | 27 | −7 |

Source: Soccerway

==== Results by round ====
| Round | 1 | 2 | 3 | 4 | 5 | 6 | 7 | 8 | 9 | 10 | 11 | 12 | 13 | 14 | 15 | 16 | 17 | 18 | 19 | 20 | 21 | 22 | 23 | 24 | 25 | 26 | 27 | 28 | 29 | 30 | 31 | 32 | 33 |
|---|---|---|---|---|---|---|---|---|---|---|---|---|---|---|---|---|---|---|---|---|---|---|---|---|---|---|---|---|---|---|---|---|---|
| Ground | A | H | A | H | A | H | A | H | A | A | H | H | A | H | A | H | A | H | A | H | H | A | A | H | A | H | A | H | A | H | A | A | H |
| Result | W | L | D | L | L | W | W | L | D | D | W | L | L | W | W | D | L | D | L | D | W | L | L | W | L | D | L | L | W | W | D | L | D |
| Position | 3 | 6 | 6 | 8 | 8 | 6 | 4 | 6 | 7 | 6 | 5 | 5 | 5 | 5 | 5 | 5 | 6 | 6 | 6 | 7 | 6 | 8 | 8 | 7 | 8 | 8 | 9 | 9 | 8 | 7 | 7 | 9 | 9 |

Source: Matches
A = Away; H = Home; W = Win; D = Draw; L = Loss

==== Matches ====
| 29 July 2022 1 | Budapest Honvéd | 0–1 | Zalaegerszeg | Budapest |
| 20:00 CEST (UTC+2) | | Report | Ubochioma 47' | Stadium: Bozsik Aréna; Attendance: 4,084; Referee: Gergő Bogár |

| 24 February 2023 2 | Zalaegerszeg | 1–2 | Ferencváros | Zalaegerszeg |
| 18:30 CET (UTC+1) | Huszti 21' | Report | Marquinhos 6' (pen.); Traoré 90' | Stadium: ZTE Arena; Attendance: 5,514; Referee: József Erdős |

| 13 August 2022 3 | Újpest | 1–1 | Zalaegerszeg | Budapest |
| 20:15 CEST (UTC+2) | Tallo 90+3' | Report | Németh 32'; Gergényi (red card) 45+1' | Stadium: Szusza Ferenc Stadion; Attendance: 3,219; Referee: István Vad |

| 21 August 2022 4 | Zalaegerszeg | 1–3 | Kisvárda | Zalaegerszeg |
| 17:55 CEST (UTC+2) | Tajti 27' (pen.) | Report | Camaj 30' (pen.); Melnyk 58', 88' | Stadium: ZTE Arena; Attendance: 2,062; Referee: Gergő Bogár |

| 27 August 2022 5 | Kecskemét | 3–1 | Zalaegerszeg | Kecskemét |
| 17:30 CEST (UTC+2) | Banó-Szabó 42' (pen.); L. Szabó 55' (pen.), 58'; B. Tóth (red card) 88' | Report | Bedi 12'; Huszti (red card) 41' | Stadium: Széktói Stadion; Attendance: 1,627; Referee: Ferenc Karakó |

| 30 August 2022 6 | Zalaegerszeg | 4–2 | Debrecen | Zalaegerszeg |
| 20:00 CEST (UTC+2) | Németh 6'; Lesjak 65'; Ikoba 80'; Gergényi 86' | Report | Deslandes 60'; Bévárdi 90+2' | Stadium: ZTE Arena; Attendance: 2,128; Referee: István Vad |

| 2 September 2022 7 | Mezőkövesd | 0–5 | Zalaegerszeg | Mezőkövesd |
| 20:00 CEST (UTC+2) | D. Bobál (red card) 34' | Report | Ikoba 40', 49', 70'; Gergényi 74'; Szalay 89' | Stadium: Mezőkövesdi Városi Stadion; Attendance: 1,601; Referee: József Erdős |

| 11 September 2022 8 | Zalaegerszeg | 1–2 | Puskás Akadémia | Zalaegerszeg |
| 15:00 CEST (UTC+2) | Ikoba 23' | Report | Băluță 74'; Slagveer 88' | Stadium: ZTE Arena; Attendance: 2,351; Referee: Csaba Pintér |

| 1 October 2022 9 | Vasas | 1–1 | Zalaegerszeg | Budapest |
| 19:30 CEST (UTC+2) | Holender 44' | Report | Lesjak 53' | Stadium: Illovszky Rudolf Stadion; Attendance: 1,770; Referee: Sándor Andó-Szabó |

| 7 October 2022 10 | Fehérvár | 1–1 | Zalaegerszeg | Székesfehérvár |
| 18:00 CEST (UTC+2) | Kodro 45+1' | Report | Ikoba 90+5' | Stadium: MOL Aréna Sóstó; Attendance: 2,474; Referee: Bence Csonka |

| 15 October 2022 11 | Zalaegerszeg | 3–0 | Paks | Zalaegerszeg |
| 14:45 CEST (UTC+2) | Ikoba 6'; Mim 18'; Gergényi 86' | Report | | Stadium: ZTE Arena; Attendance: 2,313; Referee: Gergő Bogár |

| 22 October 2022 12 | Zalaegerszeg | 0–2 | Budapest Honvéd | Zalaegerszeg |
| 13:30 CEST | | Report | Samperio 44', 53' | Stadium: ZTE Arena; Attendance: 2,216; Referee: Tamás Bognár |

| 30 October 2022 13 | Ferencváros | 2–1 | Zalaegerszeg | Budapest |
| 17:30 CET (UTC+1) | Nguen 13'; Esiti 79' | Report | Ikoba 84' | Stadium: Groupama Arena; Attendance: 9,107; Referee: Ádám Farkas |

| 5 November 2022 14 | Zalaegerszeg | 1–0 | Újpest | Zalaegerszeg |
| 19:30 CET (UTC+1) | Szalay 23'; Csóka (red card) 55' | Report | | Stadium: ZTE Arena; Attendance: 2,412; Referee: József Erdős |

| 8 November 2022 15 | Kisvárda | 0–3 | Zalaegerszeg | Kisvárda |
| 18:00 CET (UTC+1) | | Report | Ikoba 37', 60'; Manzinga 87' | Stadium: Várkerti Stadion; Attendance: 2,005; Referee: Mihály Káprály |

| 12 November 2022 16 | Zalaegerszeg | 0–0 | Kecskemét | Zalaegerszeg |
| 18:15 CET (UTC+1) | | Report | | Stadium: ZTE Arena; Attendance: 2,366; Referee: Tamás Bognár |

| 28 January 2023 17 | Debrecen | 3–0 | Zalaegerszeg | Debrecen |
| 17:00 CET (UTC+1) | Szécsi 2'; Dzsudzsák 36'; Babunski 53' | Report | Mocsi (red card) 35' | Stadium: Nagyerdei Stadion; Attendance: 2,811; Referee: Mihály Káprály |

| 5 February 2023 18 | Zalaegerszeg | 0–0 | Mezőkövesd | Zalaegerszeg |
| 15:00 CET (UTC+1) | | Report | | Stadium: ZTE Arena; Attendance: 1,893; Referee: Péter Zierkelbach |

| 12 February 2023 19 | Puskás Akadémia | 1–0 | Zalaegerszeg | Felcsút |
| 15:00 CET (UTC+1) | Gruber 82' | Report | | Stadium: Pancho Aréna; Attendance: 900; Referee: Ádám Pillók |

| 19 February 2023 20 | Zalaegerszeg | 0–0 | Vasas | Zalaegerszeg |
| 15:00 CET (UTC+1) | | Report | | Stadium: ZTE Arena; Attendance: 2,324; Referee: Gergő Bogár |

| 25 February 2023 21 | Zalaegerszeg | 2–1 | Fehérvár | Zalaegerszeg |
| 14:30 CET (UTC+1) | Csóka 32'; Szalay 55' | Report | Katona 4' | Stadium: ZTE Arena; Attendance: 2,107; Referee: Ádám Farkas |

| 4 March 2023 22 | Paks | 3–1 | Zalaegerszeg | Paks |
| 17:45 CET (UTC+1) | Varga 6'; Windecker 20', 64' | Report | Grezda 32' | Stadium: Fehérvári úti Stadion; Attendance: 1,594; Referee: István Vad |

| 11 March 2023 23 | Budapest Honvéd | 1–0 | Zalaegerszeg | Budapest |
| 19:30 CET (UTC+1) | Kocsis 39' | Report | | Stadium: Bozsik Aréna; Attendance: 3,000; Referee: József Erdős |

| 19 March 2023 24 | Zalaegerszeg | 1–0 | Ferencváros | Zalaegerszeg |
| 20:15 CET (UTC+1) | Ubochioma 45+1' | Report | | Stadium: ZTE Arena; Attendance: 3,504; Referee: Sándor Andó-Szabó |

| 1 April 2023 25 | Újpest | 3–2 | Zalaegerszeg | Budapest |
| 15:00 CEST (UTC+2) | Csoboth 30', 47', 75' | Report | Antzoulas 62' (o.g.); Ubochioma 66' | Stadium: Szusza Ferenc Stadion; Attendance: 3,338; Referee: Mihály Kápráy |

| 9 April 2023 26 | Zalaegerszeg | 0–0 | Kisvárda | Zalaegerszeg |
| 16:30 CEST (UTC+2) | Szalay (yellow card) 52'; Kovács (yellow card) 65'; Huszti (yellow card) 74'; Tajti (yellow card) 76' | Report | Spasić (yellow card) 31'; Navrátil (yellow card) 41'; Ötvös (yellow card) 75' | Stadium: ZTE Arena; Attendance: 1,683; Referee: Gergő Bogár |

| 15 April 2023 27 | Kecskemét | 3–0 | Zalaegerszeg | Kecskemét |
| 14:30 CEST (UTC+2) | Horváth 20'; A. Szabó 24'; B. Tóth 71' | Report | Mocsi (yellow card) 51'; Szendrei (yellow card) 65'; Csóka (yellow card) 78' | Stadium: Széktói Stadion; Attendance: 2,812; Referee: Bence Csonka |

| 23 April 2023 28 | Zalaegerszeg | 0–2 | Debrecen | Zalaegerszeg |
| 18:45 CEST (UTC+2) | Ikoba (yellow card) 55' | Report | Szécsi 35'; Bárány 84'; Bévárdi (yellow card) 90+1' | Stadium: ZTE Arena; Referee: Péter Zierkelbach |

| 29 April 2023 29 | Mezőkövesd | 1–2 | Zalaegerszeg | Mezőkövesd |
| 14:15 CEST (UTC+2) | Beširović 31'; D. Nagy (yellow card) 45'; Lukić (yellow card) 56'; Zahary (yellow card) 79'; Dražić (yellow card) 89' | Report | Tajti 57'; Sanković (yellow card) 59'; Mim 74' | Stadium: Városi Stadion; Attendance: 1,640; Referee: Csaba Pintér |

| 7 May 2023 30 | Zalaegerszeg | 2–1 | Puskás Akadémia | Zalaegerszeg |
| 15:00 CEST (UTC+2) | Ikoba 13'; Safronov (yellow card) 28'; Klausz 45+1'; Mocsi (yellow card) 48'; Szendrei (yellow card) 86' | Report | Colley 26', (red card) 90+1'; Ormonde-Ottewill (yellow card) 37'; Szolnoki (yellow card) 72'; Spandler (yellow card) 90+7' | Stadium: ZTE Arena; Attendance: 2,248; Referee: József Erdős |

| 13 May 2023 31 | Vasas | 1–1 | Zalaegerszeg | Budapest |
| 14:15 CEST (UTC+2) | Berecz (yellow card) 28'; Hinora 63' | Report | D. Németh 6'; Gergényi (yellow card) 84' | Stadium: Illovszky Rudolf Stadion; Attendance: 1,376; Referee: Mihály Káprály |

| 20 May 2023 32 | Fehérvár | 3–0 | Zalaegerszeg | Székesfehérvár |
| 14:10 CEST (UTC+2) | Kodro 3' (pen.), 49'; Kastrati 39' | Report | Kálnoki-Kis (yellow card) 30'; Kovács (yellow card) 40'; Szalay (yellow card) 42'; Huszti (yellow card) 75'; Mim (yellow card) 78' | Stadium: MOL Aréna Sóstó; Attendance: 6,237; Referee: Csaba Pintér |

| 26 May 2023 33 | Zalaegerszeg | 1–1 | Paks | Zalaegerszeg |
| 20:30 CEST (UTC+2) | Ubochioma 13', (yellow card) 70'; Kovács (red card) 69' | Report | Bőle 2'; Szélpál (yellow card) 33'; Hahn (yellow card) 72'; Balogh (yellow card) 75'; J. Szabó (yellow card) 89' | Stadium: ZTE Arena; Attendance: 2,672; Referee: Ádám Farkas |

=== Magyar Kupa ===
| 17 September 2022 Round of 64 | Kaposvár | 0–2 | Zalaegerszeg | Kaposvár |
| 15:00 CEST (UTC+2) | Böndi (yellow card) 82' | Report | Manzinga 54', 65' | Stadium: Rákóczi Stadion; Attendance: 500; Referee: Zoltán J. Kovács |

| 19 October 2022 Round of 32 | Kazincbarcika | 0–2 | Zalaegerszeg | Kazincbarcika |
| 17:30 CEST (UTC+2) | Szekszárdi (yellow card) 4'; Székely (yellow card) 57'; Lippai (yellow card) 71'; Csatári (yellow card) 90+2' | Report | Mocsi 5' (pen.); Ikoba (yellow card) 28'; Gergényi (yellow card) 62'; Lesjak 76' | Stadium: Pete András Stadion; Attendance: 550; Referee: Tamás Nazsa |

| 8 February 2023 Round of 16 | Békéscsaba | 0–2 | Zalaegerszeg | Békéscsaba |
| 13:00 CET (UTC+1) | | Report | Mim (yellow card) 6'; Ubochioma (yellow card) 59'; Ikoba 81'; Németh 87' | Stadium: Kórház utcai Stadion; Attendance: 380; Referee: Márton Rúsz |

| 28 February 2023 Quarter-finals | Mezőkövesd | 1–4 | Zalaegerszeg | Mezőkövesd |
| 20:00 CET (UTC+1) | Dražić (yellow card) 69'; Molnár 70' | Report | Sanković 24'; Gergényi (yellow card) 42'; Lesjak (yellow card) 69'; Tajti 74'; Szendrei (yellow card) 78'; Ikoba 88'; Huszti 90' | Stadium: Városi Stadion; Attendance: 700; Referee: Mihály Káprály |

| 4 April 2023 Semi-finals | Zalaegerszeg | 1–0 (a.e.t.) | Puskás Akadémia | Zalaegerszeg |
| 20:00 CEST (UTC+2) | Csóka (yellow card) 42'; Szendrei (yellow card) 105'; Bartolec 119' (o.g.) | Report | Ormonde-Ottewill (yellow card) 85'; Komáromi (yellow card) 89' | Stadium: ZTE Arena; Attendance: 2,081; Referee: István Vad |

| 3 May 2023 Final | Budafok | 0–2 (a.e.t.) | Zalaegerszeg | Budapest |
| 19:30 CEST (UTC+2) | Beke (yellow card) 24'; Csonka (yellow card) 72'; Németh (yellow card) 111'; Jagodics (yellow card) 120+1' | Report | Huszti (yellow card) 93'; D. Németh 117'; Szendrei (yellow card) 120+1'; Szalay (yellow card) 120+1', (goal) 120+2' | Stadium: Puskás Aréna; Attendance: 24,152; Referee: István Vad |

== Statistics ==
=== Appearances and goals ===
Last updated on 20 March 2023.

| No. | Pos | Nat | Player | Total | | Nemzeti Bajnokság I | | Magyar Kupa | |
| No. | Pos | Nat | Player | Apps | Goals | Apps | Goals | Apps | Goals |
|---|---|---|---|---|---|---|---|---|---|
| 1 | GK | (Hungary) HUN | Patrik Demjén | 28 | -27 | 24 | -26 | 4 | -1 |
| 3 | DF | (Hungary) HUN | Dávid Kálnoki-Kis | 19 | 0 | 17 | 0 | 2 | 0 |
| 4 | DF | (Croatia) CRO | Zoran Lesjak | 21 | 3 | 17 | 2 | 4 | 1 |
| 6 | MF | (Hungary) HUN | Gergely Mim | 16 | 1 | 13 | 1 | 3 | 0 |
| 7 | FW | (Albania) ALB | Eros Grezda | 3 | 1 | 3 | 1 | 0 | 0 |
| 9 | FW | (Democratic Republic of the Congo) COD | Christy Manzinga | 17 | 3 | 14 | 1 | 3 | 2 |
| 10 | MF | (Hungary) HUN | Mátyás Tajti | 21 | 2 | 19 | 1 | 2 | 1 |
| 11 | MF | (Hungary) HUN | Norbert Szendrei | 18 | 0 | 15 | 0 | 3 | 0 |
| 12 | FW | (United States) USA | Eduvie Ikoba | 24 | 12 | 21 | 10 | 3 | 2 |
| 14 | MF | (Hungary) HUN | Barnabás Kovács | 11 | 0 | 10 | 0 | 1 | 0 |
| 17 | DF | (Hungary) HUN | András Huszti | 18 | 2 | 16 | 1 | 2 | 1 |
| 18 | MF | (Montenegro) MNE | Bojan Sanković | 25 | 1 | 21 | 0 | 4 | 1 |
| 21 | DF | (Hungary) HUN | Dániel Csóka | 19 | 1 | 15 | 1 | 4 | 0 |
| 27 | MF | (Hungary) HUN | Bence Bedi | 14 | 1 | 14 | 1 | 0 | 0 |
| 29 | FW | (Nigeria) NGR | Christopher Baloteli | 1 | 0 | 1 | 0 | 0 | 0 |
| 33 | DF | (Ukraine) UKR | Oleksandr Safronov | 11 | 0 | 10 | 0 | 1 | 0 |
| 37 | DF | (Hungary) HUN | Attila Mocsi | 25 | 1 | 21 | 0 | 4 | 1 |
| 44 | DF | (Hungary) HUN | Bence Gergényi | 26 | 3 | 22 | 3 | 4 | 0 |
| 70 | MF | (Nigeria) NGR | Meshack Ubochioma | 25 | 2 | 23 | 2 | 2 | 0 |
| 77 | FW | (Hungary) HUN | Szabolcs Szalay | 24 | 3 | 22 | 3 | 2 | 0 |
| 80 | FW | (Hungary) HUN | Milán Klausz | 6 | 0 | 6 | 0 | 0 | 0 |
| 95 | GK | (Hungary) HUN | Márton Gyurján | 0 | 0 | 0 | -0 | 0 | -0 |
| 97 | FW | (Hungary) HUN | Dániel Németh | 20 | 3 | 18 | 2 | 2 | 1 |
Youth players:
| 5 | DF | (Romania) ROU | Botond Gergely | 0 | 0 | 0 | 0 | 0 | 0 |
| 25 | MF | (Ukraine) UKR | Denys Kryvotsiuk | 0 | 0 | 0 | 0 | 0 | 0 |
| 30 | MF | (Hungary) HUN | Zsombor Boros | 0 | 0 | 0 | 0 | 0 | 0 |
| 87 | MF | (Ukraine) UKR | Oleksandr Kosovchuk | 0 | 0 | 0 | 0 | 0 | 0 |
| 99 | FW | (Hungary) HUN | Csongor Papp | 0 | 0 | 0 | 0 | 0 | 0 |
Out to loan:
Players no longer at the club:
| 7 | MF | (Hungary) HUN | Milán Májer | 9 | 0 | 8 | 0 | 1 | 0 |
| 19 | MF | (Brazil) BRA | Diego Carioca | 5 | 0 | 4 | 0 | 1 | 0 |

=== Top scorers ===
Includes all competitive matches. The list is sorted by shirt number when total goals are equal.

Last updated on 20 March 2023

| Position | Nation | Number | Name | Nemzeti Bajnokság I | Magyar Kupa | Total |
|---|---|---|---|---|---|---|
| 1 | (United States) | 12 | Eduvie Ikoba | 10 | 2 | 12 |
| 2 | (Hungary) | 97 | Dániel Németh | 2 | 1 | 3 |
| 2 | (Hungary) | 77 | Szabolcs Szalay | 3 | 0 | 3 |
| 2 | (Hungary) | 44 | Bence Gergényi | 3 | 0 | 3 |
| 2 | (Democratic Republic of the Congo) | 9 | Christy Manzinga | 1 | 2 | 3 |
| 2 | (Croatia) | 4 | Zoran Lesjak | 2 | 1 | 3 |
| 7 | (Hungary) | 17 | András Huszti | 1 | 1 | 2 |
| 7 | (Hungary) | 10 | Mátyás Tajti | 1 | 1 | 2 |
| 7 | (Nigeria) | 70 | Meshack Ubochioma | 2 | 0 | 2 |
| 10 | (Hungary) | 37 | Attila Mocsi | 0 | 1 | 1 |
| 10 | (Hungary) | 27 | Bence Bedi | 1 | 0 | 1 |
| 10 | (Hungary) | 21 | Dániel Csóka | 1 | 0 | 1 |
| 10 | (Montenegro) | 18 | Bojan Sanković | 0 | 1 | 1 |
| 10 | (Albania) | 7 | Eros Grezda | 1 | 0 | 1 |
| 10 | (Hungary) | 6 | Gergely Mim | 1 | 0 | 1 |
| / | / | / | Own Goals | 0 | 0 | 0 |
| | | | TOTALS | 29 | 10 | 39 |

=== Hat-tricks ===
| Player | Against | Result | Date | Competition | Round |
|---|---|---|---|---|---|
| (United States) Eduvie Ikoba | Mezőkövesd | 5–0 (A) | 2 September 2022 | Nemzeti Bajnokság I | 7 |

=== Disciplinary record ===
Includes all competitive matches. Players with 1 card or more included only.

Last updated on 20 March 2023

| Position | Nation | Number | Name | Nemzeti Bajnokság I | | Magyar Kupa | | Total (Hu Total) | |
| Position | Nation | Number | Name | Yellow card | Red card | Yellow card | Red card | Yellow card | Red card |
| DF | (Hungary) | 3 | Dávid Kálnoki-Kis | 4 | 0 | 0 | 0 | 4 (4) | 0 (0) |
| DF | (Croatia) | 4 | Zoran Lesjak | 3 | 0 | 1 | 0 | 4 (3) | 0 (0) |
| MF | (Hungary) | 6 | Gergely Mim | 2 | 0 | 1 | 0 | 3 (2) | 0 (0) |
| MF | (Hungary) | 7 | Milán Májer | 2 | 0 | 0 | 0 | 2 (2) | 0 (0) |
| FW | (Albania) | 7 | Eros Grezda | 1 | 0 | 0 | 0 | 1 (1) | 0 (0) |
| FW | (Democratic Republic of the Congo) | 9 | Christy Manzinga | 2 | 0 | 0 | 0 | 2 (2) | 0 (0) |
| MF | (Hungary) | 10 | Mátyás Tajti | 7 | 0 | 0 | 0 | 7 (7) | 0 (0) |
| MF | (Hungary) | 11 | Norbert Szendrei | 5 | 0 | 1 | 0 | 6 (5) | 0 (0) |
| FW | (United States) | 12 | Eduvie Ikoba | 4 | 0 | 1 | 0 | 5 (4) | 0 (0) |
| MF | (Hungary) | 14 | Barnabás Kovács | 2 | 0 | 0 | 0 | 2 (2) | 0 (0) |
| DF | (Hungary) | 17 | András Huszti | 7 | 1 | 0 | 0 | 7 (7) | 1 (1) |
| MF | (Montenegro) | 18 | Bojan Sanković | 5 | 0 | 0 | 0 | 5 (5) | 0 (0) |
| MF | (Brazil) | 19 | Diego Carioca | 1 | 0 | 0 | 0 | 1 (1) | 0 (0) |
| DF | (Hungary) | 21 | Dániel Csóka | 3 | 1 | 0 | 0 | 3 (3) | 1 (1) |
| MF | (Hungary) | 27 | Bence Bedi | 1 | 0 | 0 | 0 | 1 (1) | 0 (0) |
| DF | (Hungary) | 37 | Attila Mocsi | 5 | 1 | 0 | 0 | 5 (5) | 1 (1) |
| DF | (Hungary) | 44 | Bence Gergényi | 5 | 1 | 2 | 0 | 7 (5) | 1 (1) |
| MF | (Nigeria) | 70 | Meshack Ubochioma | 3 | 0 | 1 | 0 | 4 (3) | 0 (0) |
| FW | (Hungary) | 77 | Szabolcs Szalay | 1 | 0 | 0 | 0 | 1 (1) | 0 (0) |
| FW | (Hungary) | 97 | Dániel Németh | 2 | 0 | 0 | 0 | 2 (2) | 0 (0) |
| | | | TOTALS | 65 | 4 | 7 | 0 | 72 (65) | 4 (4) |

=== Clean sheets ===
Last updated on 10 April 2023

| Position | Nation | Number | Name | Nemzeti Bajnokság I | Magyar Kupa | Total |
|---|---|---|---|---|---|---|
| 1 | (Hungary) | 1 | Patrik Demjén | 10 | 4 | 14 |
| 2 | (Hungary) | 95 | Márton Gyurján | 0 | 0 | 0 |
| | | | TOTALS | 10 | 4 | 14 |
