= 2023 Magyar Kupa final =

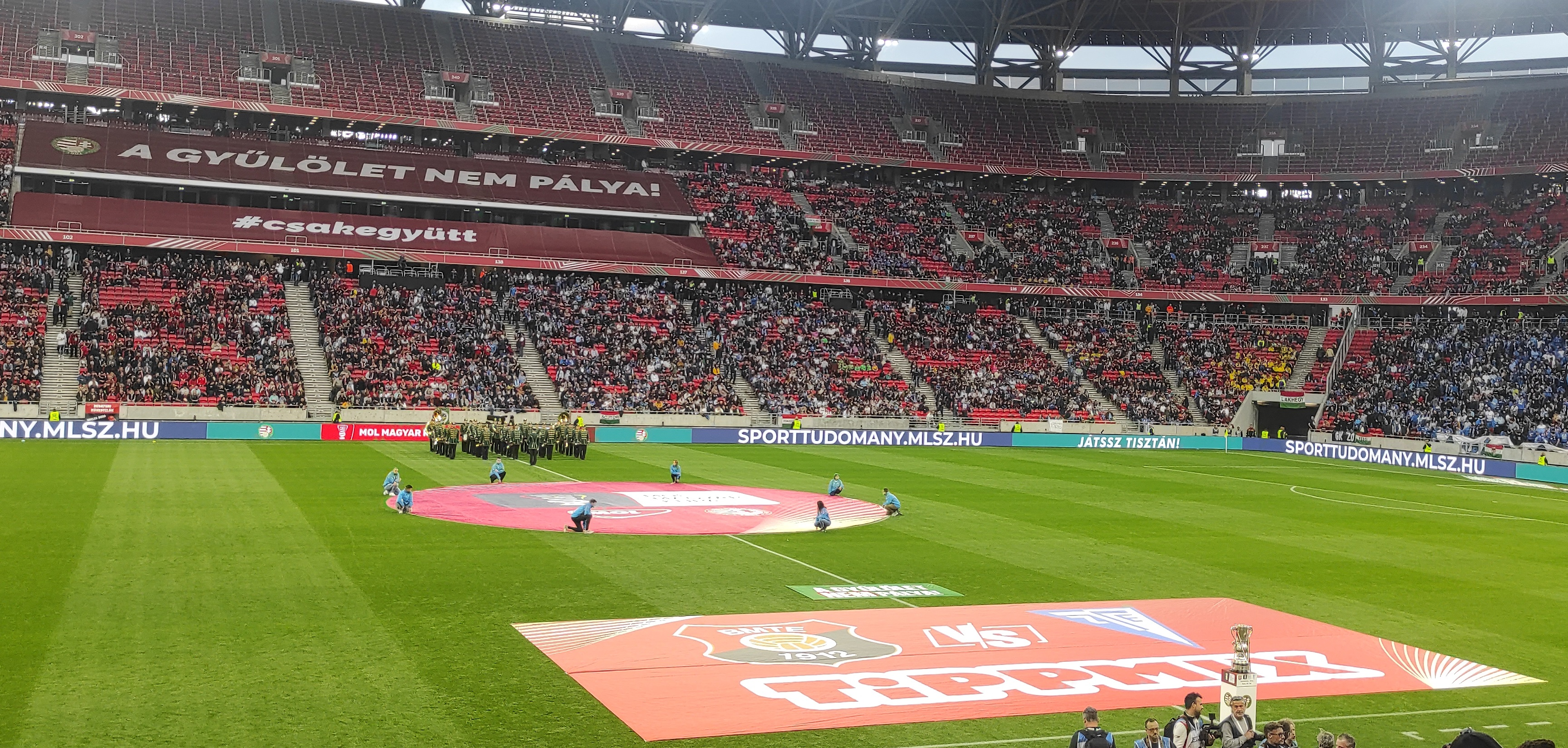
- The Puskás Aréna prior to the final.
- Event: 2022–23 Magyar Kupa
Budafok	Zalaegerszeg
0	2
- After extra time
- Date: 3 May 2023
- Venue: Puskás Aréna, Budapest
- Man of the Match: Dániel Németh (Zalaegerszeg)
- Referee: István Vad
- Attendance: 24,152

The 2023 Magyar Kupa final decided the winners of the 2022–23 Magyar Kupa, the 83rd season of Hungarian premier football cup, the Magyar Kupa. The match was played on 3 May 2023 at the Puskás Aréna in Budapest between Budafok and Zalaegerszeg.

Zalegerszeg won the match 2–0 securing their first Magyar Kupa title with scoring the goals in the last minutes of the extra time.

== Background ==
Zalaegerszeg made its second Magyar Kupa final appearance in history, having lost in 2010. For Budafok, this was their first final appearance, additionally the first second division team to reach the final since 2012.

== Route to the final ==
Note: In all results below, the score of the finalist is given first (H: home; A: away).

Budafok		Round	Zalaegerszeg	
Opponent	Result		Opponent	Result
Bye		First round	Bye	
Bye		Second round	Bye	
Bölcske (MB I)	2–1 (A)	Round of 64	Kaposvár (NB III)	2–0 (A)
Szeged (NB II)	1–0 (a.e.t.) (H)	Round of 32	Kazincbarcika (NB II)	2–0 (A)
Iváncsa (NB III)	2–1 (A)	Round of 16	Békéscsaba (NB II)	2–0 (A)
Kisvárda (NB I)	2–0 (H)	Quarter-finals	Mezőkövesd (NB I)	4–1 (A)
Vasas (NB I)	3–0 (H)	Semi-finals	Puskás Akadémia (NB I)	1–0 (a.e.t.) (H)

== Match ==
=== Details ===
3 May 2023
19:30 CEST (UTC+2)

Budafok	0–2 (a.e.t.)	Zalaegerszeg
	Report	D. Németh 117'; Szalay 120+2'

Puskás Aréna, Budapest
Attendance: 24,152
Referee: István Vad

Budafok	Zalaegerszeg

GK	27	(Hungary) Bence Gundel-Takács
CB	6	(Hungary) Botond Nándori		(substituted off) 106'
CB	26	(Hungary) Márk Jagodics	(yellow card) 120+1'
CB	48	(Hungary) Dominik Fótyik
RM	20	(Hungary) Márk Bíró		(substituted off) 89'
CM	8	(Hungary) András Csonka	(yellow card) 72'
CM	50	(Hungary) Bálint Oláh
LM	33	(Hungary) Olivér Kalmár		(substituted off) 106'
AM	10	(Hungary) Dávid Kovács (c)		(substituted off) 65'
CF	9	(Hungary) Péter Beke	(yellow card) 24'	(substituted off) 100'
CF	11	(Hungary) Olivér Horváth		(substituted off) 79'
Substitutes:
GK	1	(Hungary) István Oroszi
GK	29	(Hungary) András Horváth
DF	3	(Hungary) Andor Margitics		(substituted on) 106'
DF	91	(Hungary) Gergő Vaszicsku		(substituted on) 106'
MF	15	(Hungary) Márió Németh	(yellow card) 111'	(substituted on) 65'
MF	23	(Hungary) Balázs Bakti		(substituted on) 100'
MF	37	(Hungary) Máté Fekete		(substituted on) 89'
FW	7	(Hungary) Arthur Györgyi
FW	13	(Hungary) Zoltán Vasvári		(substituted on) 79'
FW	17	(Hungary) Ronald Takács
FW	19	(Hungary) Patrik Tischler
FW	82	(Hungary) Máté Sós
Manager:
(Hungary) János Mátyus

GK	1	(Hungary) Patrik Demjén
RWB	6	(Hungary) Gergely Mim		(substituted off) 46'
CB	37	(Hungary) Attila Mocsi
CB	3	(Hungary) Dávid Kálnoki-Kis (c)
CB	21	(Hungary) Dániel Csóka
LWB	44	(Hungary) Bence Gergényi		(substituted off) 98'
CM	18	(Montenegro) Bojan Sanković		(substituted off) 112'
CM	11	(Hungary) Norbert Szendrei	(yellow card) 120+1'
RF	70	(Nigeria) Meshack Ubochioma		(substituted off) 77'
LF	10	(Hungary) Mátyás Tajti		(substituted off) 120'
CF	12	(United States) Eduvie Ikoba		(substituted off) 46'
Substitutes:
GK	95	(Hungary) Márton Gyurján
DF	4	(Croatia) Zoran Lesjak		(substituted on) 120'
DF	17	(Hungary) András Huszti	(yellow card) 93'	(substituted on) 46'
DF	33	(Ukraine) Oleksandr Safronov
MF	14	(Hungary) Barnabás Kovács		(substituted on) 112'
MF	27	(Hungary) Bence Bedi		(substituted on) 98'
MF	97	(Hungary) Dániel Németh		(substituted on) 46'
FW	7	(Albania) Eros Grezda
FW	77	(Hungary) Szabolcs Szalay	(yellow card) 120+1'	(substituted on) 77'
FW	80	(Hungary) Milán Klausz
FW	99	(Hungary) Csongor Papp
Manager:
(Hungary) Gábor Boér

Man of the Match:
Dániel Németh (Zalaegerszeg)

Assistant referees:
Vencel Tóth II.
István Albert
Fourth official:
Csaba Pintér
Video assistant referee:
Zoltán Iványi
Assistant video assistant referee:
Gergely Becséri

Match rules

- 90 minutes
- 30 minutes of extra time if necessary
- Penalty shoot-out if scores still level
- Twelve named substitutes
- Maximum of five substitutions, with a sixth allowed in extra time
