= János Mátyus =

Hungarian football player and manager (born 1974)

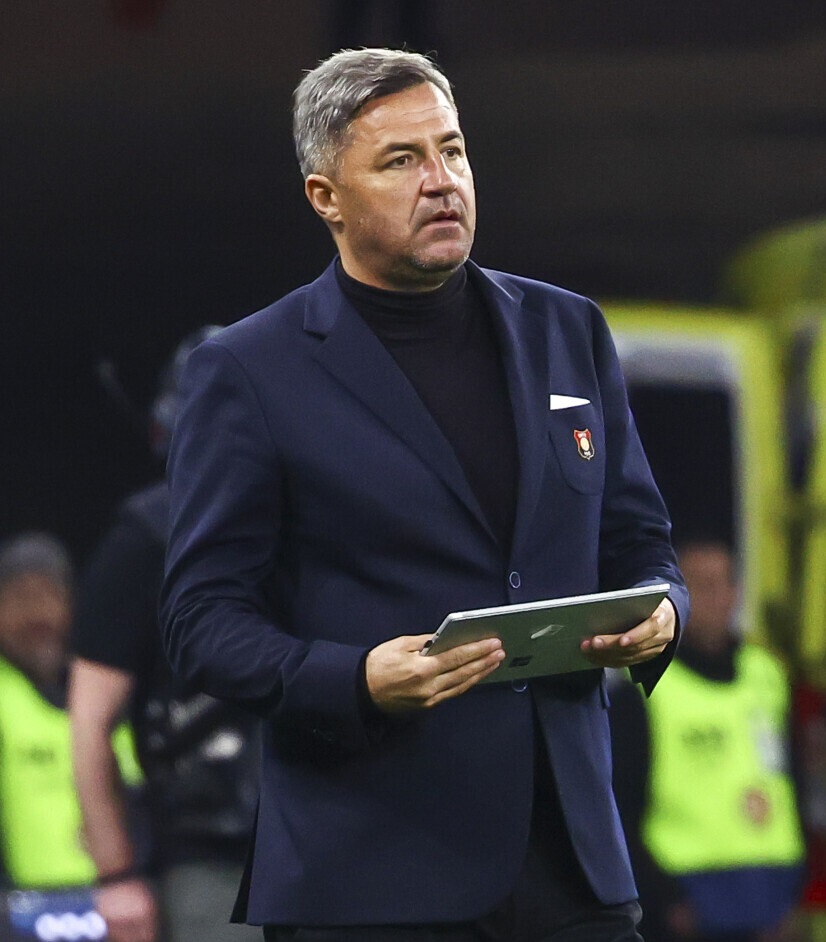
- Mátyus managing Budafok at the 2023 Magyar Kupa final

Personal information
- Date of birth: 20 December 1974 (age 51)
- Place of birth: Győr, Hungary
- Height: 1.94 m (6 ft 4 in)
- Position: Full-back

Team information
- Current team: Olympic Charleroi (sporting director)

Senior career*
Years	Team	Apps	(Gls)
1993–1998	Budapest Honvéd	94	(11)
1998–2000	Ferencváros	38	(7)
2000–2002	Energie Cottbus	57	(5)
2002–2003	Hibernian	14	(0)
2003–2005	Admira Wacker Mödling	49	(4)
2005–2007	Győri ETO FC	39	(4)
2007–2008	Ferencváros	26	(5)
2008	ASIL Lysis	0	(0)
2009–2010	Tatabánya	37	(5)
2014	Ferencváros	0	(0)
Total		354	(41)

International career
1998–2002	Hungary	34	(3)

Managerial career
- 2009–2010: FC Tatabánya (assistant)
- 2010–2014: Rákospalota
- 2014: Lombard Pápa
- 2014–2016: Nyíregyháza Spartacus
- 2019–2021: Haladás
- 2021: Sopron
- 2022–2023: Budafok
- 2023: Kisvárda
- 2024: Pécs
- * Club domestic league appearances and goals

János Mátyus (born 20 December 1974) is a Hungarian professional football manager, executive, and former player. He currently serves as the sporting director of Challenger Pro League club Olympic Charleroi.

== Managerial career ==
On 23 August 2022, Mátyus was appointed manager of Nemzeti Bajnokság II club Budafok. On 3 May 2023, he led the second-division team to the 2023 Magyar Kupa final against Zalaegerszeg, where they were defeated 2–0 after extra time.

On 3 September, he was appointed as the coach of Nemzeti Bajnokság I club Kisvárda.

On 10 January 2026, it was announced that Mátyus would be the new sporting director of Challenger Pro League club Olympic Charleroi.

== International career ==
He made his debut for the Hungary national team in 1998, and made 34 appearances and scored three goals between then and 2002.

== Honours ==
=== Manager ===
Budafok

- Magyar Kupa runner-up: 2022–23
