= Bence Gergényi =

Hungarian footballer (born 1998)

Personal information
- Date of birth: 16 March 1998 (age 28)
- Place of birth: Budapest, Hungary
- Height: 1.87 m (6 ft 2 in)
- Position: Defender

Team information
- Current team: Újpest
- Number: 44

Youth career
- 2007–2016: Honvéd

Senior career*
Years	Team	Apps	(Gls)
2016–2019	Honvéd II	31	(1)
2018	→ Szeged (loan)	17	(0)
2018–2019	→ Zalaegerszeg (loan)	24	(1)
2019–2023	Zalaegerszeg	96	(4)
2020	→ Nafta 1903 (loan)	1	(0)
2021–2022	Zalaegerszeg II	5	(0)
2023–2024	Fehérvár	25	(0)
2024–	Újpest	47	(0)

International career^{‡}
2013	Hungary U15	4	(0)
2013–2014	Hungary U16	11	(0)
2014–2015	Hungary U17	8	(0)
2015–2016	Hungary U18	11	(0)
2016–2017	Hungary U19	10	(0)
2017–2020	Hungary U21	6	(0)
- * Club domestic league appearances and goals as of 30 May 2026 ‡ National team caps and goals as of 22:00, 13 November 2020 (UTC)

Bence Gergényi (born 16 March 1998) is a Hungarian professional footballer, who plays as a defender for Nemzeti Bajnokság I club Újpest.

== Club career ==
=== Early career ===
During his youth years, he joined the academy of Honvéd in 2007.

=== Szeged ===
Gergényi joined Szeged on loan for the second half of the 2017–18 season. On 25 February 2018, he debuted in the Nemzeti Bajnokság II in a 3–0 win against Vác.

=== Zalaegerszeg ===
On 20 June 2018, Gergényi completed a season-long loan move to Zalaegerszeg. He completed his permanent move at the end of the season. On 3 May 2023, he won the 2023 Magyar Kupa final with the club by beating Budafok 2–0 at the Puskás Aréna.

=== Nafta 1903 ===
He was loaned out to Zalagerszeg's sister club, Slovenian Second League club Nafta 1903 in 2020. The domestic league was suspended due the coronavirus pandemic, but the team reached the Slovenian Football Cup final.

=== Fehérvár ===
On 6 September 2023, Gergényi joined Fehérvár from Zalaegerszeg. Gergényi signed a 2 plus 1-year contract with Fehérvár.

=== Újpest ===
Gergényi signed with Újpest, reuniting with his manager at Fehérvár, Bartosz Grzelak.

== International career ==
On 27 August 2024, Marco Rossi invited him to play against Germany in the 2024–25 UEFA Nations League match due on 7 September 2024.

== Career statistics ==
=== Club ===
As of match played 23 August 2025

Appearances and goals by club, season and competition
Club	Season	League			National cup (Note: Includes Magyar Kupa, Slovenian Football Cup)		Europe		Total	
Club	Season	Division	Apps	Goals	Apps	Goals	Apps	Goals	Apps	Goals
Honvéd II	2015–16	Nemzeti Bajnokság III	3	0	—		—		3	0
Honvéd II	2016–17	Nemzeti Bajnokság III	16	1	—		—		16	1
Honvéd II	2017–18	Nemzeti Bajnokság III	12	0	—		—		12	0
Honvéd II	Total		31	1	—		—		31	1
Szeged (loan)	2017–18	Nemzeti Bajnokság II	17	0	—		—		17	0
Zalaegerszeg (loan)	2018–19	Nemzeti Bajnokság II	24	1	1	0	—		25	1
Zalaegerszeg	2019–20	Nemzeti Bajnokság I	6	0	4	0	—		10	0
Zalaegerszeg	2020–21	Nemzeti Bajnokság I	27	1	4	0	—		31	1
Zalaegerszeg	2021–22	Nemzeti Bajnokság I	29	0	2	0	—		31	0
Zalaegerszeg	2022–23	Nemzeti Bajnokság I	29	3	6	0	—		35	3
Zalaegerszeg	2023–24	Nemzeti Bajnokság I	5	0	—		2 (Note: Appearances in UEFA Europa Conference League)	0	7	0
Zalaegerszeg	Total		120	5	17	0	2	0	139	5
Nafta 1903 (loan)	2019–20	Slovenian Second League	1	0	2	0	—		3	0
Zalaegerszeg II	2020–21	Nemzeti Bajnokság III	1	0	—		—		1	0
Zalaegerszeg II	2021–22	Nemzeti Bajnokság III	3	0	—		—		3	0
Zalaegerszeg II	2022–23	Nemzeti Bajnokság III	1	0	—		—		1	0
Zalaegerszeg II	Total		5	0	—		—		5	0
Fehérvár	2023–24	Nemzeti Bajnokság I	25	0	1	0	—		26	0
Újpest	2024–25	Nemzeti Bajnokság I	28	0	1	0	—		29	0
Újpest	2025–26	Nemzeti Bajnokság I	3	0	0	0	—		3	0
Újpest	Total		31	0	1	0	—		32	0
Career total			230	6	21	0	2	0	253	6

== Honours ==
Zalaegerszeg

- Nemzeti Bajnokság II: 2018–19
- Magyar Kupa: 2022–23

Nafta 1903

- Slovenian Football Cup runner-up: 2019–20
