= Oleksandr Safronov =

Ukrainian footballer

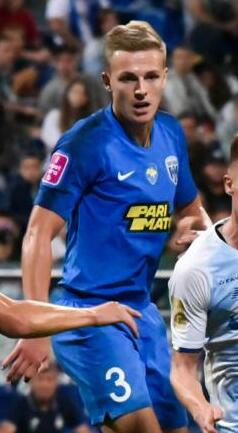

Personal information
- Full name: Oleksandr Oleksandrovych Safronov
- Date of birth: 11 June 1999 (age 27)
- Place of birth: Zaporizhzhia, Ukraine
- Height: 1.87 m (6 ft 2 in)
- Position: Defender

Team information
- Current team: Kispest Honvéd
- Number: 33

Youth career
- 2011–2015: Metalurh Zaporizhzhia
- 2016–2017: Dnipro Dnipropetrovsk

Senior career*
Years	Team	Apps	(Gls)
2016–2017	Dnipro-2 Dnipropetrovsk		
2017	Dnipro Dnipropetrovsk	0	(0)
2017–2021	Dnipro-1	34	(1)
2018	→ Zirka Kropyvnytskyi (loan)	12	(0)
2020	→ Levadia Tallinn (loan)	8	(2)
2021–2022	Desna Chernihiv	16	(0)
2022	→ Nafta 1903 (loan)	5	(0)
2022–2025	Zalaegerszeg	55	(1)
2025–2026	Unirea Slobozia	25	(0)
2026–	Kispest Honvéd	6	(0)

International career
2016–2017	Ukraine U18	4	(0)
2017–2018	Ukraine U19	9	(2)
2018–2019	Ukraine U20	7	(0)
Medal record
Men's football
Representing Ukraine
UEFA European Under-19 Championship
Bronze medal – third place	2018 Finland
FIFA U-20 World Cup
Winner	2019 Poland
- * Club domestic league appearances and goals as of 3 November 2026

Oleksandr Oleksandrovych Safronov (Ukrainian: Олександр Олександрович Сафронов; born 11 June 1999) is a Ukrainian professional footballer who plays as a defender for Nemzeti Bajnokság I club Kispest Honvéd.

== Club career ==
Safronov is a product of the FC Metalurh Zaporizhia and the FC Dnipro academy systems. In March 2017, he was promoted to the senior squad of FC Dnipro but never made his debut in the Ukrainian Premier League.

=== Dnipro-1 ===
In June 2017, Safronov joined the newly-created Dnipro-1. He made his debut for the club as a second-half substitute in a Ukrainian Second League match against Metalist 1925 Kharkiv on 15 July. In January 2020, he moved on loan to Meistriliiga club Levadia Tallinn, where he played 8 games and scored 2 goal in the 2020 season.

Following his stint in Estonia, Safronov returned to Dnipro-1 in Ukraine.

=== Desna Chernihiv ===
On 14 July 2021 he signed a two-year contract with Desna Chernihiv in the Ukrainian Premier League. On 25 July, he made his league debut against Chornomorets Odesa at the Stadion Yuri Gagarin.

=== Nafta 1903 (on loan) ===
On 26 March 2022, Safronov moved on loan to Slovenian club Nafta 1903. On 18 April, he made his debut against Ilirija.

=== Zalaegerszeg ===
On 10 June 2022 he signed a two-year contract with Zalaegerszeg in the Nemzeti Bajnokság I. In June 2025 his contract was expired.

=== Unirea Slobozia ===
On 31 July 2025, he signed for Unirea Slobozia in Liga I.

=== Kispest Honvéd ===
On 15 August 2026, he moved to Kispest Honvéd.

== International career ==
On 15 June 2019, Safronov won the 2019 FIFA U-20 World Cup with the Ukraine under-20 national team.

== Career statistics ==
=== Club ===
As of match played 16 November 2026

Appearances and goals by club, season and competition
Club	Season	League			National cup (Note: Includes Ukrainian Cup, Magyar Kupa)		Europe		Other		Total	
Club	Season	Division	Apps	Goals	Apps	Goals	Apps	Goals	Apps	Goals	Apps	Goals
Dnipro Dnipropetrovsk	2016–17	Ukrainian Premier League	0	0	0	0	—		—		0	0
Dnipro-1	2017–18	Ukrainian Second League	16	1	0	0	—		—		16	1
Dnipro-1	2018–19	Ukrainian First League	3	0	—		—		—		3	0
Dnipro-1	2019–20	Ukrainian Premier League	12	0	0	0	—		—		12	0
Dnipro-1	2020–21	Ukrainian Premier League	3	0	1	1	—		—		4	1
Dnipro-1	Career total		34	1	1	1	—		—		35	2
Zirka Kropyvnytskyi (loan)	2018–19	Ukrainian First League	12	0	2	0	—		—		14	0
Levadia Tallinn (loan)	2020	Meistriliiga	8	2	—		—		—		8	2
Desna Chernihiv	2021–22	Ukrainian Premier League	16	0	0	0	—		—		16	0
Nafta 1903 (loan)	2021–22	Slovenian Second League	5	0	—		—		—		5	0
Zalaegerszeg	2022–23	Nemzeti Bajnokság I	15	0	1	0	—		—		16	0
Zalaegerszeg	2023–24	Nemzeti Bajnokság I	23	1	0	0	2 (Note: Appearances in UEFA Europa Conference League)	0	—		25	1
Zalaegerszeg	2024–25	Nemzeti Bajnokság I	17	0	4	0	—		—		21	0
Zalaegerszeg	Career total		55	1	5	0	2	0	—		62	1
Unirea Slobozia	2025–26	Liga I	25	0	1	0	—		—		26	0
Kispest Honvéd	2026–27	Nemzeti Bajnokság I	6	0	2	0	—		—		8	0
Career total			161	4	11	1	2	0	0	0	174	5

== Honours ==
=== Club ===
==== Zalaegerszeg ====
- Magyar Kupa: 2022–23

==== Dnipro-1 ====
- Ukrainian Second League: 2017–18

=== International ===
==== Ukraine U20 ====
- FIFA U-20 World Cup: 2019

==== Ukraine U17 ====
- Valeriy Lobanovskyi Memorial Tournament: 2018
