= Barnabás Kovács =

Hungarian footballer (born 2002)

Personal information
- Date of birth: 14 November 2002 (age 23)
- Place of birth: Dunaújváros, Hungary
- Position: Midfielder

Team information
- Current team: Kecskemét
- Number: 11

Youth career
- 2008–2012: DVSI
- 2012–2014: DUFK
- 2014–2019: Dunaújváros

Senior career*
Years	Team	Apps	(Gls)
2019–2020	Dunaújváros	31	(3)
2020–2024	Zalaegerszeg II	31	(3)
2020–2024	Zalaegerszeg	42	(0)
2021–2022	→ Tiszakécske (loan)	36	(5)
2024–	Kecskemét	27	(2)

International career^{‡}
2022–2023	Hungary U21	10	(1)
- * Club domestic league appearances and goals as of 24 August 2025 ‡ National team caps and goals as of 17 November 2023

Barnabás Kovács (born 14 November 2002) is a Hungarian professional footballer, who plays as a midfielder for Nemzeti Bajnokság II club Kecskemét. He represented Hungary at youth level.

== Career ==
=== Zalaegerszeg ===
On 3 May 2023, he helped Zalaegerszeg to win their first ever Magyar Kupa title in a 2–0 win against Budafok, coming as a substitute in the 112th minute for Bojan Sanković.

=== Kecskemét ===
On 11 June 2024, Kovács was sold to Nemzeti Bajnokság I side Kecskemét. He scored his first top division goal on 30 November 2024 in a 2–1 win against Győr.

== Career statistics ==
As of match played 24 August 2025

Appearances and goals by club, season and competition
Club	Season	League			Magyar Kupa		Europe		Total	
Club	Season	Division	Apps	Goals	Apps	Goals	Apps	Goals	Apps	Goals
Dunaújváros	2018–19	Nemzeti Bajnokság III	14	0	—		—		14	0
Dunaújváros	2019–20	Nemzeti Bajnokság III	17	3	5	0	—		22	3
Dunaújváros	Total		31	3	5	0	—		36	3
Zalaegerszeg II	2020–21	Nemzeti Bajnokság III	19	1	—		—		19	1
Zalaegerszeg II	2022–23	Nemzeti Bajnokság III	8	1	—		—		8	1
Zalaegerszeg II	2023–24	Nemzeti Bajnokság III	4	1	—		—		4	1
Zalaegerszeg II	Total		31	3	—		—		31	3
Zalaegerszeg	2020–21	Nemzeti Bajnokság I	12	0	3	0	—		15	0
Zalaegerszeg	2022–23	Nemzeti Bajnokság I	16	0	3	0	—		19	0
Zalaegerszeg	2023–24	Nemzeti Bajnokság I	14	0	1	0	2 (Note: Appearances in UEFA Europa Conference League)	0	17	0
Zalaegerszeg	Total		42	0	7	0	2	0	51	0
Tiszakécske (loan)	2021–22	Nemzeti Bajnokság II	36	5	1	0	—		37	5
Kecskemét	2024–25	Nemzeti Bajnokság I	22	1	1	0	—		23	1
Kecskemét	2025–26	Nemzeti Bajnokság II	5	1	0	0	—		5	1
Kecskemét	Total		27	2	1	0	—		28	2
Career total			167	13	14	0	2	0	183	13

== Honours ==
Zalaegerszeg

- Magyar Kupa: 2022–23
