= Zsombor Senkó =

Hungarian footballer (born 2003)

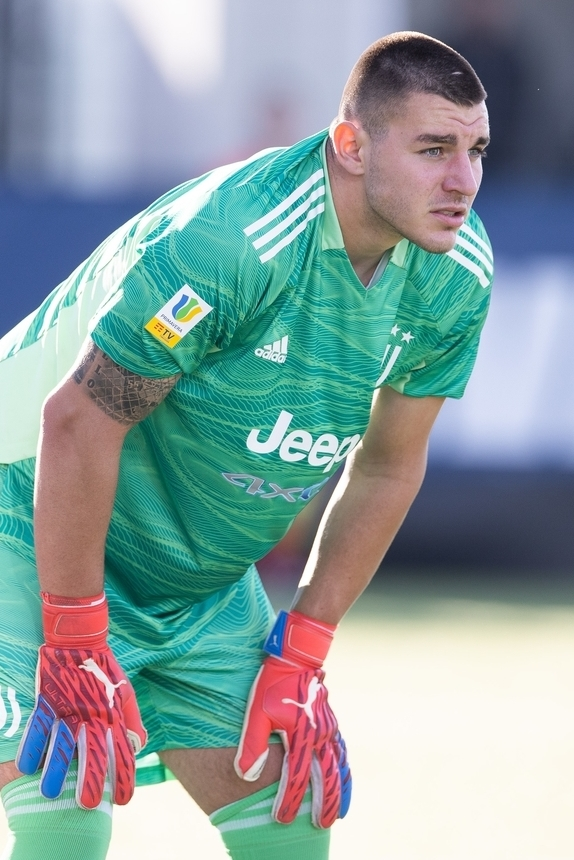
- Senkó with Juventus U19 in 2021

Personal information
- Date of birth: 4 January 2003 (age 23)
- Place of birth: Hungary
- Height: 1.95 m (6 ft 5 in)
- Position: Goalkeeper

Team information
- Current team: Nafta 1903 (on loan from Zalaegerszeg)
- Number: 90

Youth career
- 2009–2011: Zalaegerszeg
- 2011: Police-Ola LSK
- 2011–2014: Zalaegerszegi USC
- 2014–2016: Zalaegerszeg
- 2016–2018: Haladás
- 2018–2019: Illés Akadémia
- 2019–2022: Juventus

Senior career*
Years	Team	Apps	(Gls)
2021–2023	Juventus Next Gen (Note: The team's name was changed from Juventus U23 to Juventus Next Gen in August 2022.)	5	(0)
2023	Diósgyőr	4	(0)
2023–	Zalaegerszeg	7	(0)
2024–	→ Nafta 1903 (loan)	6	(0)

International career
2019	Hungary U17	3	(0)
- * Club domestic league appearances and goals as of 16 March 2025

Zsombor Senkó (born 4 January 2003) is a Hungarian professional footballer who plays as a goalkeeper for Slovenian club Nafta 1903 on loan from Nemzeti Bajnokság I club Zalaegerszeg.

== Club career ==
=== Juventus ===
In January 2019, Juventus reached an agreement for the purchase of Senkó from Illés Akadémia, the youth academy of Szombathelyi Haladás; he officially joined in April. Senkó made his Serie C debut for Juventus U23 – the reserve team of Juventus – on 17 January 2021, playing as a starter in a 1–1 home draw against Piacenza. On 27 February, Senkó extended his contract with Juventus until 2022.

Senkó was first called up to the first team on 6 January 2022, for the Serie A match against Napoli. During the 2021–22 season, Senkó made 29 appearances and helped the U19s reach the UEFA Youth League semifinals, their best-ever placing in the competition, having also won a penalty shoot-out against Jong AZ in the round of 16. Throughout the season, he never appeared for Juventus U23.

=== Diósgyőri VTK ===
On 3 January 2023, he left Juventus to join Nemzeti Bajnokság II club Diósgyőri VTK.

=== Zalaegerszegi TE ===
On 16 June 2023, Senkó signed for Zalaegerszeg on a 2+1-year contract.

== Career statistics ==
=== Club ===
As of match played 17 September 2022

Appearances and goals by club, season and competition
Club	Season	League			National cup		Other		Total	
Club	Season	Division	Apps	Goals	Apps	Goals	Apps	Goals	Apps	Goals
Juventus Next Gen	2020–21	Serie C	1	0	—		0	0	1	0
Juventus Next Gen	2021–22	Serie C	0	0	—		0	0	0	0
Juventus Next Gen	2022–23	Serie C	4	0	—		0	0	4	0
Juventus Next Gen	Total		5	0	0	0	0	0	5	0
Diósgyőri VTK	2022–23	Nemzeti Bajnokság II	2	0	—		0	0	2	0
Career total			7	0	0	0	0	0	7	0
