= Eduvie Ikoba =

American soccer player (born 1997)

Personal information
- Full name: Eduvie Marho Ikoba
- Date of birth: October 26, 1997 (age 29)
- Place of birth: Bettendorf, Iowa, United States
- Height: 1.93 m (6 ft 4 in)
- Position: Forward

Team information
- Current team: Zemun
- Number: 12

College career
Years	Team	Apps	(Gls)
2015–2018	Dartmouth Big Green	62	(17)

Senior career*
Years	Team	Apps	(Gls)
2018	Black Rock	1	(0)
2019–2020	Zalaegerszeg	25	(4)
2020–2022	AS Trenčín	46	(9)
2022–2023	Zalaegerszeg	32	(11)
2023–2026	Académico de Viseu	3	(0)
2024	→ Seoul E-Land FC (loan)	17	(6)
2024–2025	→ Zemplín Michalovce (loan)	17	(0)
2026	Kazincbarcikai	10	(0)
2026–	Zemun	0	(0)
- * Club domestic league appearances and goals as of May 30, 2026

Eduvie Marho Ikoba (born October 26, 1997) is an American professional soccer player who plays as a forward for Zemun in the Serbian SuperLiga.

== Career ==
=== Early career ===
Ikoba played four years of college soccer at Dartmouth College between 2015 and 2018, where he scored 17 goals and tallied 8 assists in 62 appearances.

While at college, Ikoba also appeared for USL PDL side Black Rock FC in 2018, where he made a single appearance.

=== Professional ===
On January 14, 2019, Ikoba was selected 63rd overall in the 2019 MLS SuperDraft by FC Dallas. However, he was released by the club without earning a contract.

In July 2019, Ikoba signed for Hungarian NB I side ZTE.

On July 13, 2020, Ikoba moved to Fortuna Liga side AS Trenčín on a three-year deal.

In the summer of 2022, Ikoba returned to ZTE. On January 23, 2023, he renewed his contract with the Hungarian club until 2025.

On September 1, 2023, Ikoba signed a three-year contract with Liga Portugal 2 side Académico de Viseu.

On January 11, 2024, Ikoba was loaned out to K League 2 club Seoul E-Land FC until the end of the 2024 season, with the deal including an option-to-buy. On September 9, 2024, Ikoba returned to Slovakia and joined Zemplín Michalovce on a season-long loan.

On 21 January 2026, Ikoba permanently left Académico de Viseu, returning to Hungary, joining Nemzeti Bajnokság I club Kazincbarcika.

== Career statistics ==
As of match played 6 August 2023

Appearances and goals by club, season and competition
Club	Season	League			National cup		League cup		Continental		Other		Total	
Club	Season	Division	Apps	Goals	Apps	Goals	Apps	Goals	Apps	Goals	Apps	Goals	Apps	Goals
Zalaegerszeg	2019–20	Nemzeti Bajnokság I	25	4	3	1	—		—		—		28	5
AS Trenčín	2020–21	Slovak First Football League	26	5	1	0	—		—		1 (Note: Appearance in Slovak First Football League 2021 Europa Conference League play-offs)	0	28	5
AS Trenčín	2021–22	Slovak First Football League	22	4	4	1	—		—		1 (Note: Appearance in Slovak First Football League 2022 Europa Conference League play-offs)	0	27	5
AS Trenčín	Total		46	9	5	1	—		—		2	0	53	10
Zalaegerszeg	2022–23	Nemzeti Bajnokság I	28	11	4	2	—		—		—		32	13
Zalaegerszeg	2023–24	Nemzeti Bajnokság I	4	0	0	0	—		2 (Note: Appearance(s) in UEFA Europa Conference League)	1	—		6	1
Zalaegerszeg	Total		32	11	4	2	—		2	1	—		38	14
Académico de Viseu	2023–24	Liga Portugal 2	3	0	1	0	0	0	—		0	0	4	0
Career total			108	24	13	4	0	0	2	1	2	0	125	29
