= ZTE Arena =

Football stadium in Zalaegerszeg, Hungary

Coordinates: 46°50′55″N 16°50′55″E

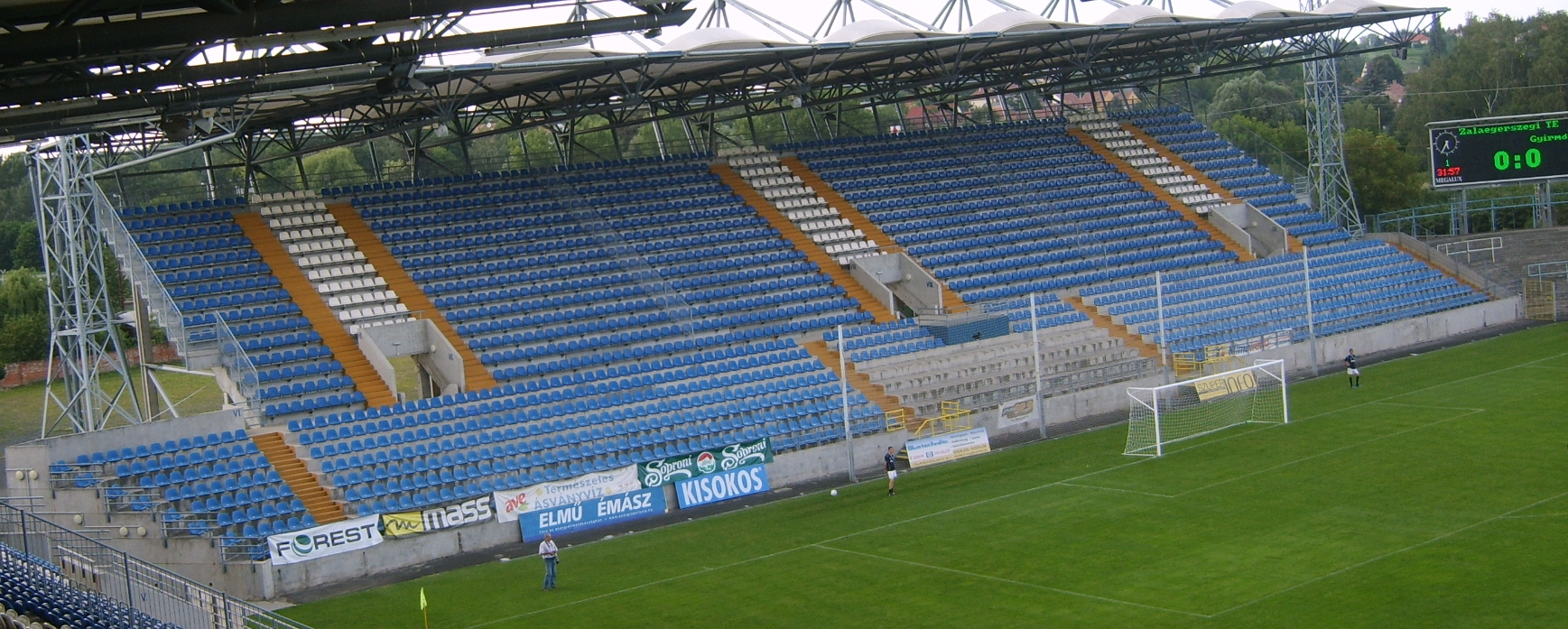
- ZTE Arena
- Interactive map of ZTE Arena
- Location: Zalaegerszeg, Hungary
- Capacity: 11,200
- Field size: 105 x 68 m

Construction
- Opened: 2002

Tenants
- Zalaegerszegi TE (Soproni Liga)

ZTE Arena is a stadium in Zalaegerszeg, Hungary. It is currently used mostly for football matches and is the home stadium of Zalaegerszegi TE. The stadium is able to hold 11,200 people.

== History ==
On 26 March 2017 the renovated stadium was inaugurated. All the stands of the stadium became covered. Gábor Végh, owner of the Zalaegerszegi TE, said that after 15 years the renovation of the stadium was finished. The club house, the ZTE shop, and the VIP sector was also completely renovated.

On 5 September 2024, Belarus hosted Bulgaria at the stadium due to UEFA sanctions on Belarus as a result of Belarusian involvement in the Russian invasion of Ukraine. The match ended with a goalless draw. Two more Belarus home games were played, against Northern Ireland on 12 October and Luxembourg on 15 October.

The stadium is set to hold at least two more international games involving Belarus in the upcoming 2026 World Cup qualifying on 8 September and 9 October, against Scotland and Denmark respectively. On 9 October 2025, Belarus hosted Denmark in the 2026 FIFA World Cup qualifying match. The match ended with a 6-0 victory for Denmark.

== National team matches ==
25 April 2004

Hungary	3–2	Japan
Kuttor 53'; Juhász 67'; Huszti 92'	Report	Tamada 75'; Tatsuhiko 77'

Friendly match
Attendance: 7,000
Referee: Edo Trivkovic (Croatia)
26 March 2008

Hungary	0–1	Slovenia
	Report	Šišić 59'

Friendly match
Attendance: 6,000
Referee: Stefan Messner (Austria)
5 September 2024
20:45

Belarus	0–0	Bulgaria
	Report

Attendance: 0 (Note: Due to the Belarusian involvement in the Russian invasion of Ukraine, Belarus were required to play their home matches at neutral venues, and behind closed doors, until further notice.)
Referee: Ovidiu Hațegan (Romania)
12 October 2024
20:45

Belarus	0–0	Northern Ireland
	Report

Attendance: 0
Referee: Henrik Nalbandyan (Armenia)
15 October 2024
20:45

Belarus	1–1	Luxembourg
Politevich 54'	Report	Rodrigues 78' (pen.)

Attendance: 0
Referee: Atilla Karaoğlan (Turkey)
8 September 2025
20:45

Belarus	0–2	Scotland
	Report	Adams 43'; Volkov 65' (o.g.)

Attendance: 0
Referee: Nikola Dabanović (Montenegro)
9 October 2025
20:45

Belarus	0–6	Denmark
	Report	Froholdt 14'; Højlund 19', 45'; Dorgu 45+6'; Dreyer 66', 78'

Attendance: 0
Referee: Filip Glova (Slovakia)
18 November 2025
20:45

Belarus	0–0	Greece
	Report

Attendance: 0
Referee: Damian Sylwestrzak (Poland)

=== Average attendances (Hungarian League) ===
- 2000-01: 8,124
- 2001-02: 9,000
- 2002-03: 4,719
- 2003-04: 4,031
- 2004-05: 4,667
- 2005-06: 3,033
- 2006-07: 4,033
- 2007-08: 3,133
- 2008-09: 3,809
- 2009-10: 3,929

== Gallery ==
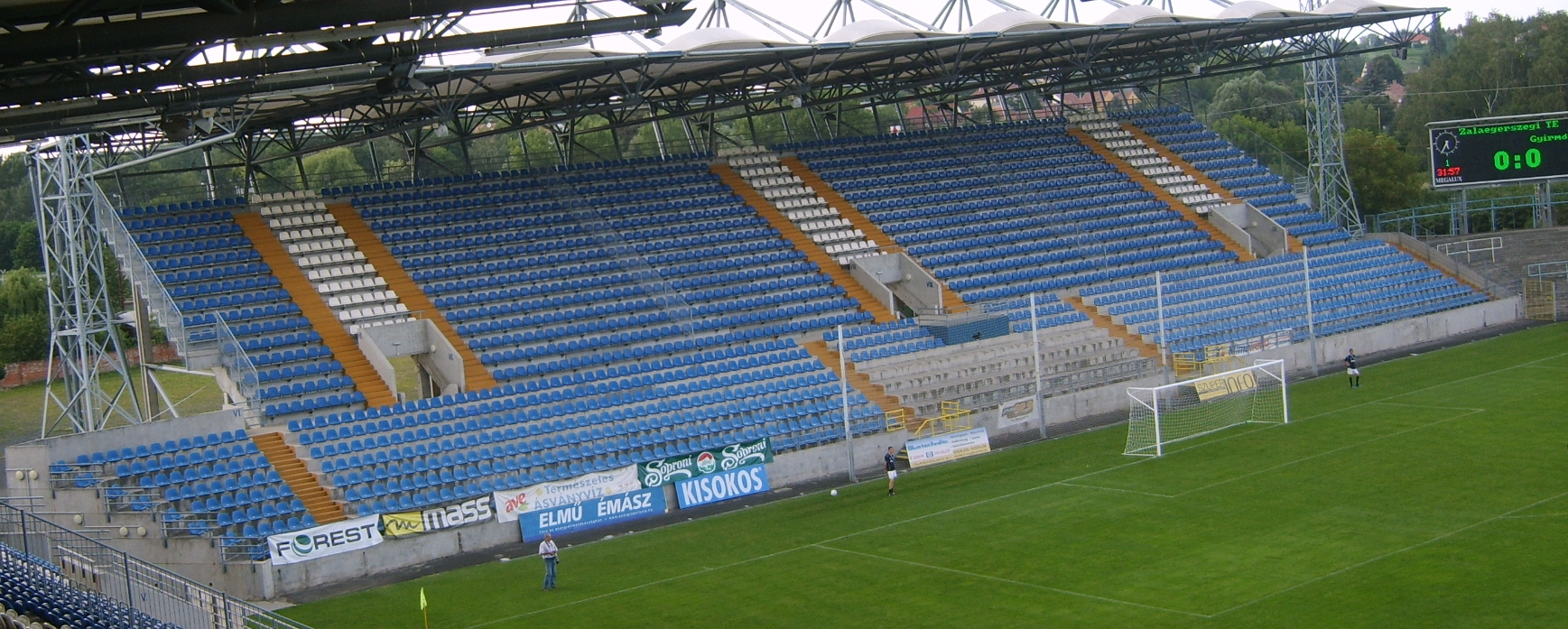
The western stand

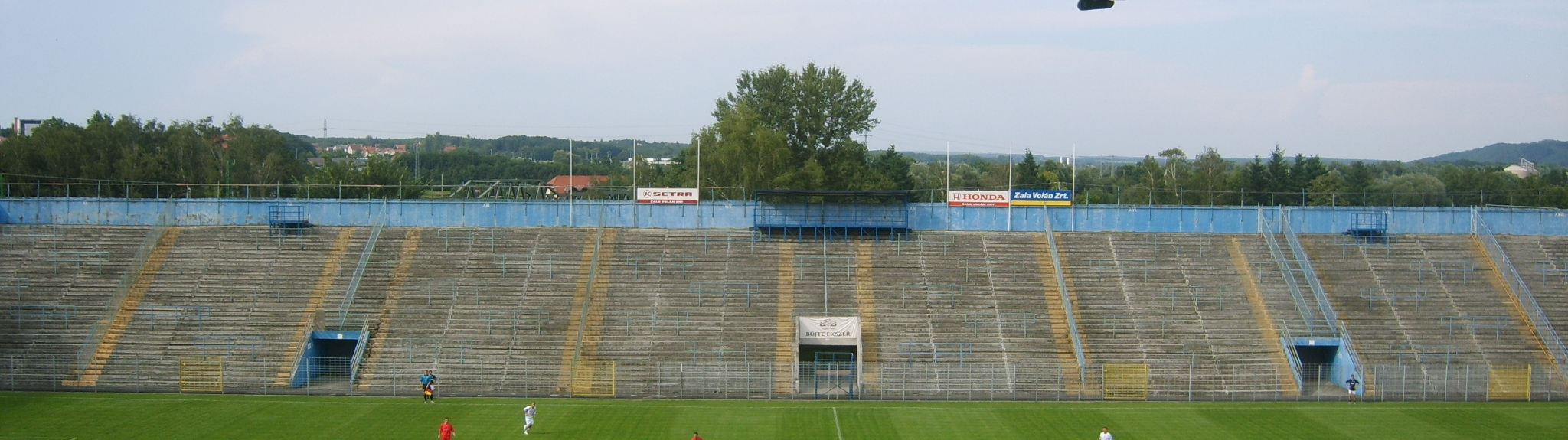
The northern stand

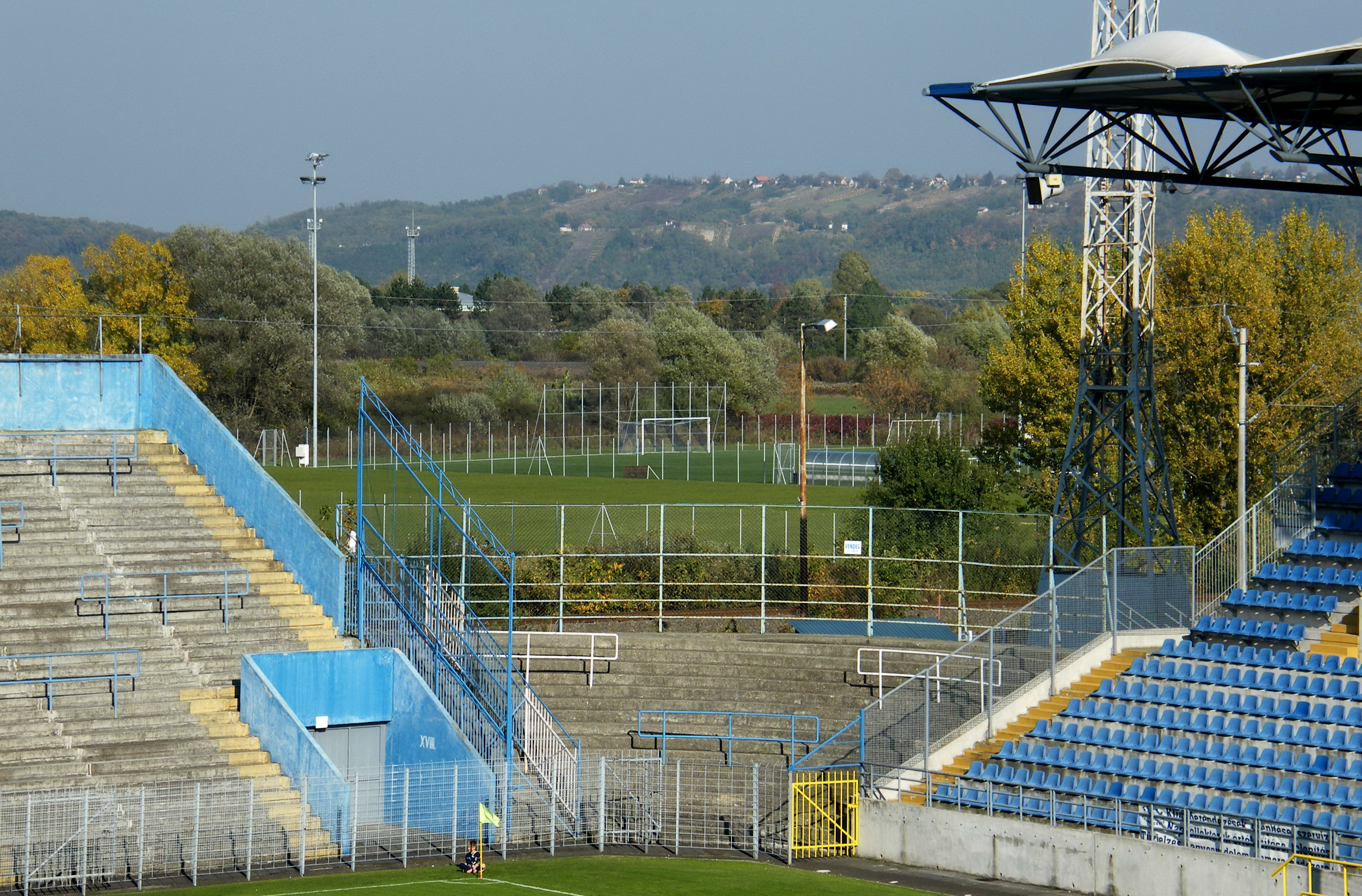
Away stand

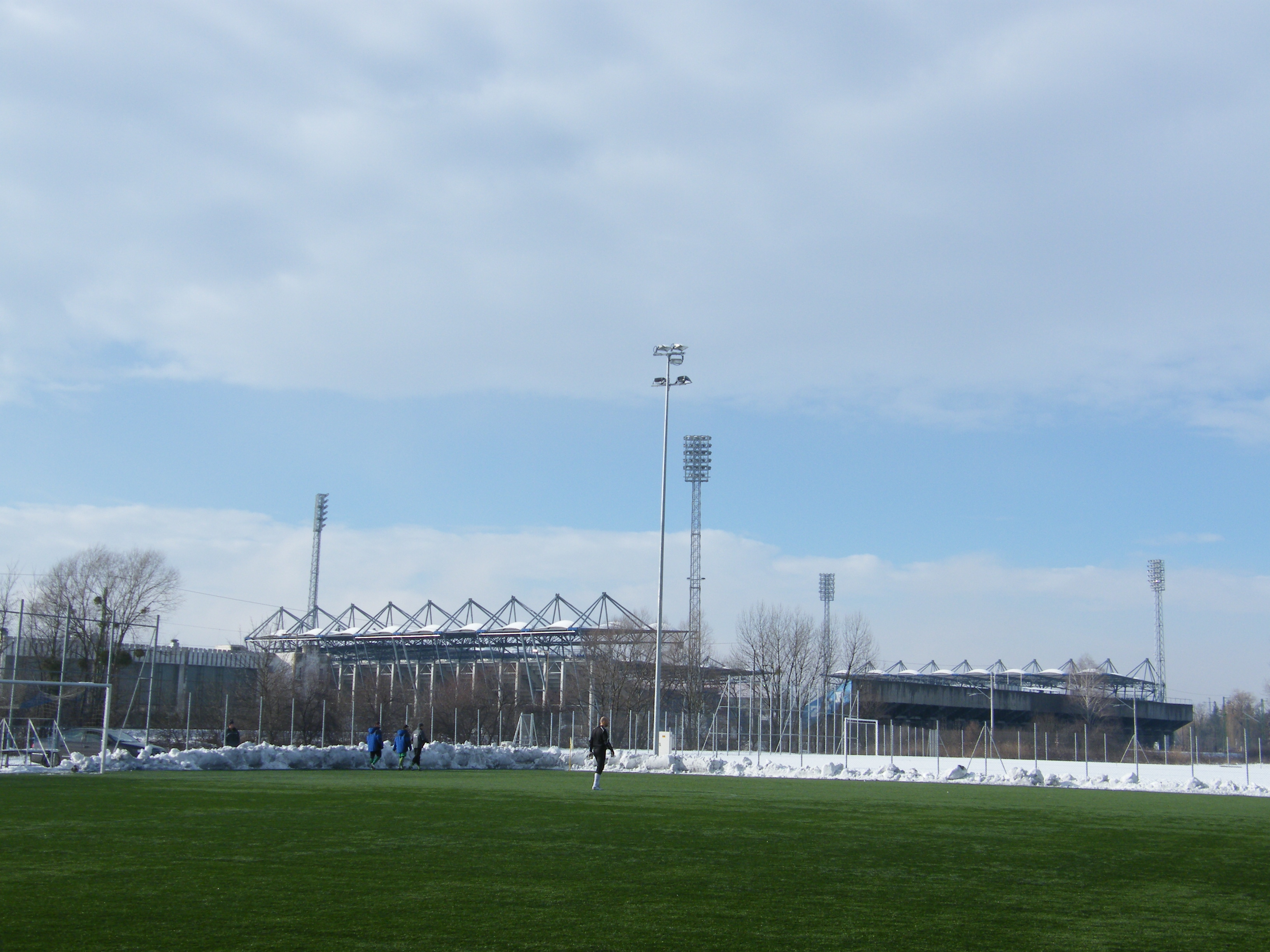
View from the training pitch

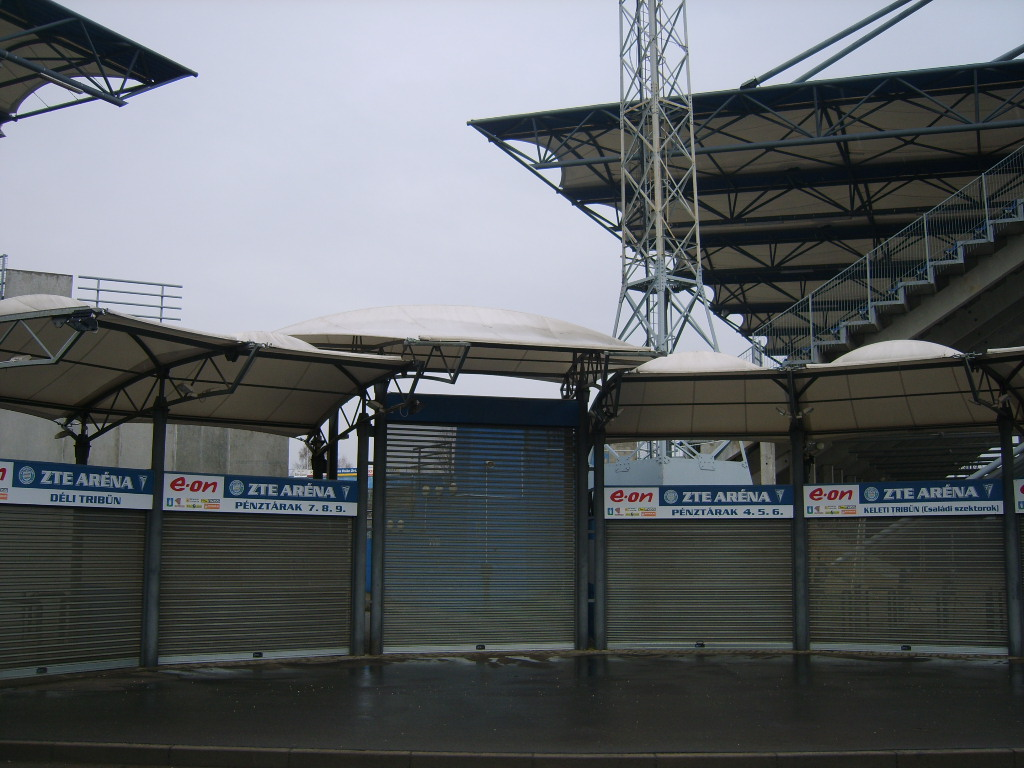
Arena Entry
