= Szabolcs Szalay =

Hungarian footballer

Personal information
- Date of birth: 17 February 2002 (age 24)
- Place of birth: Veszprém, Hungary
- Height: 1.81 m (5 ft 11 in)
- Position: Forward

Team information
- Current team: FK Csíkszereda
- Number: 79

Youth career
- 2021–2013: Veszprém
- 2013–2020: Illés Akadémia

Senior career*
Years	Team	Apps	(Gls)
2019–2021	Haladás	21	(2)
2021–2025	Zalaegerszeg	54	(3)
2021	→ Tiszakécske (loan)	14	(2)
2024	→ Vasas (loan)	9	(0)
2024–2025	→ Nafta 1903 (loan)	33	(3)
2025–	FK Csíkszereda	43	(4)

International career
2017–2018	Hungary U16	13	(4)
2018–2019	Hungary U17	9	(2)
2021	Hungary U19	1	(0)
2022–2023	Hungary U21	3	(0)
- * Club domestic league appearances and goals as of 7 November 2026

Szabolcs Szalay (born 17 February 2002) is a Hungarian professional footballer who plays as a forward for Liga I club FK Csíkszereda.

== Club career ==
=== Zalaegerszegi TE ===
Szalay joined Zalaegerszeg during the January 2021 transfer window. He played an essential role in winning the 2022–23 Magyar Kupa with the club, managing to score in the cup final.

=== FK Csíkszereda ===
On 1 July 2025, Szalay joined FK Csíkszereda.

== International career ==
Szalay has represented Hungary at youth international level.

== Career statistics ==
As of match played 7 November 2026

Appearances and goals by club, season and competition
Club	Season	League			National cup (Note: Includes Magyar Kupa, Slovenian Cup, Cupa României)		Europe		Other		Total	
Club	Season	Division	Apps	Goals	Apps	Goals	Apps	Goals	Apps	Goals	Apps	Goals
Haladás	2019–20	Nemzeti Bajnokság II	11	2	4	0	—		—		15	2
Haladás	2020–21	Nemzeti Bajnokság II	10	0	0	0	—		—		10	0
Haladás	Total		21	2	4	0	—		—		25	2
Zalaegerszeg	2020–21	Nemzeti Bajnokság I	2	0	2	0	—		—		4	0
Zalaegerszeg	2021–22	Nemzeti Bajnokság I	11	0	—		—		—		11	0
Zalaegerszeg	2022–23	Nemzeti Bajnokság I	31	3	4	1	—		—		35	4
Zalaegerszeg	2023–24	Nemzeti Bajnokság I	10	0	2	0	2 (Note: Appearances in UEFA Europa Conference League)	0	—		14	0
Zalaegerszeg	Total		54	3	8	1	2	0	—		64	4
Tiszakécske (loan)	2021–22	Nemzeti Bajnokság II	14	2	1	0	—		—		15	2
Vasas (loan)	2023–24	Nemzeti Bajnokság II	9	0	1	0	—		—		10	0
Nafta 1903 (loan)	2024–25	Slovenian PrvaLiga	33	3	3	0	—		—		36	3
FK Csíkszereda	2025–26	Liga I	33	4	4	0	—		—		37	4
FK Csíkszereda	2026–27	Liga I	10	0	3	1	—		—		13	1
FK Csíkszereda	Total		43	4	7	1	—		—		50	5
Career total			174	14	24	2	2	0	—		200	16

== Honours ==
Zalaegerszeg

- Magyar Kupa: 2022–23
