= Gergely Mim =

Hungarian footballer (born 1999)

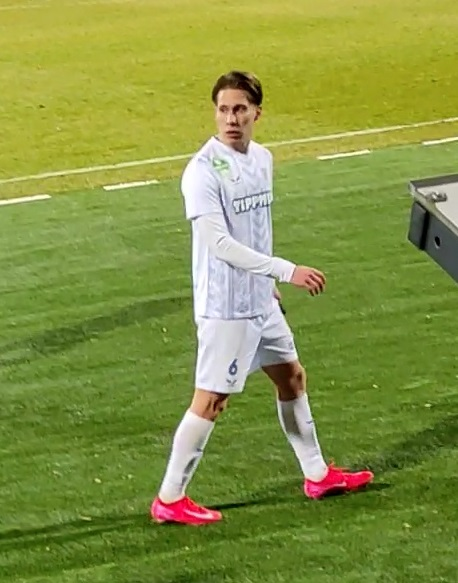
- Mim with Zalaegerszeg in 2025

Personal information
- Full name: Gergely Mim
- Date of birth: 7 June 1999 (age 27)
- Place of birth: Pécs, Hungary
- Height: 1.77 m (5 ft 10 in)
- Position: Midfielder

Team information
- Current team: Zalaegerszegi TE
- Number: 6

Youth career
- 2005–2009: Villány
- 2009–2013: Kozármisleny
- 2013–2015: Pécsi MFC
- 2015–2018: Puskás Akadémia

Senior career*
Years	Team	Apps	(Gls)
2016–2021	Puskás Akadémia II	42	(5)
2019–2021	→ Aqvital FC Csákvár (loan)	50	(8)
2021–2024	Puskás Akadémia	0	(0)
2021–2022	→ Aqvital FC Csákvár (loan)	28	(3)
2022–2024	→ Zalaegerszegi TE (loan)	47	(7)
2024–	Zalaegerszegi TE	28	(8)

International career
2016	Hungary U17	2	(0)
2017–2018	Hungary U19	5	(0)
- * Club domestic league appearances and goals as of 27 April 2025

Gergely Mim (born 7 June 1999 in Pécs, Hungary) is a Hungarian professional footballer who plays as a midfielder for Zalaegerszegi TE in the Nemzeti Bajnokság I.

== Club career ==
In the summer of 2024, after two years on loan, Mim permanently signed for Zalaegerszegi TE.

== International career ==
Mim is a former youth international for Hungary, having represented the U17 and U19 teams.

== Career statistics ==
- As of 27 April 2025.*

Club	Season	League			Cup		Europe		Other		Total	
Club	Season	Division	Apps	Goals	Apps	Goals	Apps	Goals	Apps	Goals	Apps	Goals
Puskás Akadémia II	2016–17	NB III	3	0	—	—	—	—	—	—	3	0
Puskás Akadémia II	2017–18	NB III	13	1	—	—	—	—	—	—	13	1
Puskás Akadémia II	2018–19	NB III	26	4	—	—	—	—	—	—	26	4
Total		NB III	42	5	—	—	—	—	—	—	42	5
Aqvital FC Csákvár (loan)	2019–20	NB II	21	1	1	0	—	—	—	—	22	1
Aqvital FC Csákvár (loan)	2020–21	NB II	29	7	3	1	—	—	—	—	32	8
Aqvital FC Csákvár (loan)	2021–22	NB II	28	3	2	1	—	—	—	—	30	4
Total		NB II	78	11	6	2	—	—	—	—	84	13
Zalaegerszegi TE	2022–23	NB I	18	2	4	0	—	—	—	—	22	2
Zalaegerszegi TE	2023–24	NB I	29	5	2	0	0	0	—	—	31	5
Zalaegerszegi TE	2024–25	NB I	28	8	5	2	—	—	—	—	33	10
Total		NB I	75	15	11	2	0	0	—	—	86	17
Career total			195	31	17	4	0	0	—	—	212	35

== Honours ==
Zalaegerszegi TE

- Hungarian Cup: 2022–23

=== Individual ===
- Nemzeti Bajnokság I Player of the Month: November 2024
