= Márton Gyurján =

Hungarian footballer

Personal information
- Full name: Márton László Gyurján
- Date of birth: 1 May 1995 (age 31)
- Place of birth: Nyíregyháza, Hungary
- Height: 1.86 m (6 ft 1 in)
- Position: Goalkeeper

Team information
- Current team: Szentlőrinc
- Number: 44

Youth career
- –2009: Nyíregyháza
- 2009–2014: Haladás

Senior career*
| Years | Team | Apps | (Gls) |
| 2014–2020 | Haladás | 26 | (0) |
| 2020–2024 | Zalaegerszeg | 11 | (0) |
| 2024– | Szentlőrinc | 44 | (0) |
- * Club domestic league appearances and goals as of 31 May 2026

Márton Gyurján (born 1 May 1995) is a Hungarian football player who plays for Szentlőrinc.

His brother Bence is a footballer too.
