= Zoran Lesjak =

Croatian footballer (born 1988)

Personal information
- Date of birth: 1 February 1988 (age 38)
- Place of birth: Čakovec, SFR Yugoslavia
- Height: 1.85 m (6 ft 1 in)
- Position: Central midfielder

Team information
- Current team: Varteks

Youth career
- 1997–2002: Čakovec
- 2002–2006: Varteks

Senior career*
Years	Team	Apps	(Gls)
2007	Sloboda Tužno		
2007–2009	Varteks	24	(0)
2010	Međimurje	8	(1)
2010–2011	Nafta Lendava	39	(6)
2011–2013	Maribor	23	(2)
2013–2015	Hrvatski Dragovoljac	42	(3)
2015–2018	Osijek	60	(2)
2018	→ Santarcangelo (loan)	15	(2)
2018–2024	Zalaegerszeg	144	(14)
2024–2025	Nafta 1903	19	(0)
2025–	Varteks	0	(0)
- * Club domestic league appearances and goals as of 16 March 2025

Zoran Lesjak (born 1 February 1988) is a Croatian footballer who plays for Croatian flight outfit Varteks.
