= Dániel Csóka =

Hungarian association football player

Personal information
- Full name: Dániel Csóka
- Date of birth: 4 April 2000 (age 26)
- Place of birth: Zalaegerszeg, Hungary
- Height: 1.88 m (6 ft 2 in)
- Position: Defender

Team information
- Current team: Vasas
- Number: 17

Youth career
- Zalaegerszeg
- 2017–2018: Wolverhampton Wanderers

Senior career*
| Years | Team | Apps | (Gls) |
| 2018–2020 | Wolverhampton Wanderers | 0 | (0) |
| 2019 | → Dunajská Streda (loan) | 0 | (0) |
| 2019 | → Šamorín (loan) | 1 | (0) |
| 2020–2022 | AFC Wimbledon | 37 | (1) |
| 2022–2026 | Zalaegerszegi | 69 | (3) |
| 2026– | Vasas | 4 | (2) |

International career^{‡}
| 2016 | Hungary U16 | 3 | (0) |
| 2016–2017 | Hungary U17 | 9 | (0) |
| 2018 | Hungary U18 | 2 | (0) |
| 2017–2019 | Hungary U19 | 14 | (0) |
- * Club domestic league appearances and goals as of 14 August 2026 ‡ National team caps and goals as of 3 December 2020

Dániel Csóka (born 4 April 2000) is a Hungarian professional footballer who plays as a defender for Hungarian First Division club Vasas.

== Club career ==
Born in Zalaegerszeg, Csóka began his career at hometown club Zalaegerszegi TE, before joining English club Wolverhampton Wanderers in January 2017. Whilst a Wolves player he spent loan spells at Slovak clubs DAC 1904 Dunajská Streda and ŠTK 1914 Šamorín.

After being released by Wolves, in September 2020 he signed for AFC Wimbledon following a trial. He scored his first and only goal for Wimbledon in a 5–2 defeat at Charlton Athletic on 12 December 2020.

On 4 July 2022, Csóka returned to Hungary to rejoin Zalaegerszegi for an undisclosed fee in order to be closer to his family. In June 2026 he signed for Vasas.

== International career ==
Csóka has represented Hungary at youth international level up to under-19 level.

== Personal life ==
His father Zsolt Csóka was also a footballer.

== Career statistics ==
As of match played 30 April 2022

Appearances and goals by club, season and competition
| Club | Season | League | | | National Cup | | League Cup | | Other | | Total | |
| Club | Season | Division | Apps | Goals | Apps | Goals | Apps | Goals | Apps | Goals | Apps | Goals |
|---|---|---|---|---|---|---|---|---|---|---|---|---|
| Wolverhampton Wanderers | 2018–19 | Premier League | 0 | 0 | 0 | 0 | 0 | 0 | 0 | 0 | 0 | 0 |
| Wolverhampton Wanderers | 2019–20 | Premier League | 0 | 0 | 0 | 0 | 0 | 0 | 0 | 0 | 0 | 0 |
| Wolverhampton Wanderers | Total | | 0 | 0 | 0 | 0 | 0 | 0 | 0 | 0 | 0 | 0 |
| Dunajská Streda (loan) | 2018–19 | Slovak Super Liga | 0 | 0 | 0 | 0 | 0 | 0 | 0 | 0 | 0 | 0 |
| Šamorín (loan) | 2019–20 | 2. Liga | 1 | 0 | 0 | 0 | 0 | 0 | 0 | 0 | 1 | 0 |
| AFC Wimbledon | 2020–21 | League One | 20 | 1 | 2 | 0 | 0 | 0 | 3 (Note: Appearance(s) in the EFL Trophy.) | 0 | 25 | 1 |
| AFC Wimbledon | 2021–22 | League One | 17 | 0 | 2 | 0 | 2 | 0 | 1 | 0 | 22 | 0 |
| AFC Wimbledon | Total | | 37 | 1 | 4 | 0 | 2 | 0 | 4 | 0 | 47 | 1 |
| Career total | | | 38 | 1 | 4 | 0 | 2 | 0 | 4 | 0 | 48 | 1 |
