= Bence Bedi =

Hungarian professional footballer

Personal information
- Date of birth: 14 November 1996 (age 30)
- Place of birth: Nagykanizsa, Hungary
- Height: 1.82 m (6 ft 0 in)
- Position: Defensive midfielder

Team information
- Current team: Fehérvár
- Number: 27

Youth career
- 2005–2009: Letenye
- 2009–2011: Nagykanizsa
- 2011–2014: Zalaegerszeg

Senior career*
Years	Team	Apps	(Gls)
2014–2024	Zalaegerszeg	276	(19)
2024–	Fehérvár	51	(2)

International career^{‡}
2017	Hungary U-21	1	(0)
- * Club domestic league appearances and goals as of 31 May 2026 ‡ National team caps and goals as of 22 March 2017

Bence Bedi (born 14 November 1996) is a Hungarian professional footballer who plays for Fehérvár FC.

== Career statistics ==
As of 27 June 2020

Appearances and goals by club, season and competition
Club	Season	League			Cup		Continental		Other		Total	
Club	Season	Division	Apps	Goals	Apps	Goals	Apps	Goals	Apps	Goals	Apps	Goals
Zalaegerszeg	2014–15	Nemzeti Bajnokság II	12	0	0	0	—		0	0	12	0
Zalaegerszeg	2015–16	Nemzeti Bajnokság II	27	4	3	0	—		0	0	30	4
Zalaegerszeg	2016–17	Nemzeti Bajnokság II	29	2	2	0	—		0	0	31	2
Zalaegerszeg	2017–18	Nemzeti Bajnokság II	30	0	3	0	—		0	0	33	0
Zalaegerszeg	2018–19	Nemzeti Bajnokság II	39	6	1	0	—		0	0	40	6
Zalaegerszeg	2019–20	Nemzeti Bajnokság I	31	2	6	1	—		0	0	38	3
Zalaegerszeg	Total		169	14	15	1	0	0	0	0	184	15
Career total			169	14	15	1	0	0	0	0	184	15
