= Mátyás Tajti =

Hungarian footballer (born 1998)

Personal information
- Date of birth: 2 June 1998 (age 28)
- Place of birth: Budapest, Hungary
- Height: 1.83 m (6 ft 0 in)
- Position: Midfielder

Team information
- Current team: FK Csíkszereda
- Number: 19

Youth career
- 2006–2008: Viadukt Biatorbágy
- 2008–2011: Felcsút
- 2011–2013: Ferencváros
- 2013: Videoton
- 2013–2014: Puskás Akadémia
- 2014–2016: Barcelona
- 2016–2017: Málaga

Senior career*
Years	Team	Apps	(Gls)
2016–2018	Málaga B	55	(2)
2018–2019	Diósgyőr	33	(7)
2019–2020	Zagłębie Lubin	3	(0)
2019	Zagłębie Lubin II	2	(0)
2020–2023	Zalaegerszeg	79	(8)
2023–2026	Újpest	48	(5)
2026–	FK Csíkszereda	7	(0)

International career
2012–2013	Hungary U15	8	(1)
2013–2014	Hungary U16	14	(1)
2014–2015	Hungary U17	11	(0)
2015–2016	Hungary U18	5	(1)
2018–2019	Hungary U21	5	(1)
- * Club domestic league appearances and goals as of 11 September 2026

Mátyás Tajti (born 2 June 1998) is a Hungarian professional footballer who plays as a midfielder for Liga I club FK Csíkszereda.

== Honours ==
Zalaegerszeg

- Magyar Kupa: 2022–23
