= András Huszti =

Hungarian footballer (born 2001)

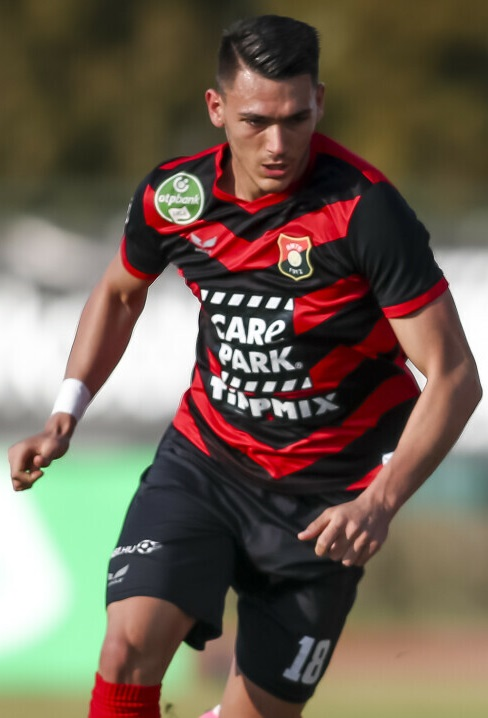
- Huszti playing for Budafok in 2021

Personal information
- Date of birth: 29 January 2001 (age 25)
- Place of birth: Pécs, Hungary
- Height: 1.86 m (6 ft 1 in)
- Position: Defender

Team information
- Current team: Politehnica Timișoara
- Number: 6

Youth career
- 2010–2013: Pécs
- 2013–2014: Kozármisleny
- 2014–2018: Haladás

Senior career*
Years	Team	Apps	(Gls)
2018–2019	Tiszakécske	20	(1)
2019–2022	Puskás Akadémia	2	(0)
2019	Puskás Akadémia II	7	(0)
2020	→ Csákvár (loan)	4	(0)
2020–2021	→ Budafok (loan)	25	(0)
2021–2022	→ Zalaegerszeg (loan)	9	(1)
2022–2025	Zalaegerszeg	41	(1)
2024	→ Újpest (loan)	8	(1)
2024–2025	→ Videoton (loan)	18	(0)
2026	CSA Steaua București	9	(0)
2026–	Politehnica Timișoara	11	(1)

International career
2017	Hungary U17	1	(0)
2019	Hungary U18	7	(1)
2019	Hungary U19	5	(1)
2021	Hungary U21	2	(0)
- * Club domestic league appearances and goals as of 31 October 2026

András Huszti (born 29 January 2001) is a Hungarian professional footballer who plays as a right-back for Liga II club Politehnica Timișoara.

== Club career ==
On 26 May 2021, Huszti joined Zalaegerszeg on loan for the 2021–22 season. On 16 June 2022, Zalaegerszeg made the transfer permanent and signed a three-year contract with Huszti.

On 14 February 2024, Huszti was loaned by Újpest.

On 8 February 2026, Huszti moved to Romania, signing with Liga II club Steaua București on a contract valid until the end of the season.

== Honours ==
Zalaegerszeg

- Magyar Kupa: 2022–23
