= Dániel Németh (footballer) =

Hungarian footballer

Personal information
- Date of birth: 9 October 2003 (age 23)
- Place of birth: Gyöngyös, Hungary
- Height: 1.81 m (5 ft 11 in)
- Position: Centre-forward

Team information
- Current team: Videoton
- Number: 18

Youth career
- 2010–2016: Gyöngyös
- 2016–2017: Diósgyőr
- 2017–2020: Budapest Honvéd

Senior career*
Years	Team	Apps	(Gls)
2020–2021	Budapest Honvéd	2	(0)
2021–	Zalaegerszeg	70	(7)
2022	→ Nafta 1903 (loan)	12	(4)
2023–	→ Mosonmagyaróvár	4	(1)
2025–	→ Videoton (loan)	20	(10)

International career^{‡}
2018	Hungary U-15	4	(2)
2018–2019	Hungary U-16	10	(4)
2019	Hungary U-17	9	(4)
2021	Hungary U-18	1	(0)
2021–2022	Hungary U-19	10	(4)
2022–	Hungary U-21	6	(0)
- * Club domestic league appearances and goals as of 31 May 2026 ‡ National team caps and goals as of 19 June 2023

Dániel Németh (born 9 October 2003) is a Hungarian professional footballer who plays for Zalaegerszeg on loan with Nemzeti Bajnokság II club Videoton.

== Career statistics ==
As of 4 November 2020.

Appearances and goals by club, season and competition
Club	Season	League			Cup		Continental		Other		Total	
Club	Season	Division	Apps	Goals	Apps	Goals	Apps	Goals	Apps	Goals	Apps	Goals
Budapest Honvéd	2020–21	Nemzeti Bajnokság I	2	0	0	0	0	0	—		2	0
Budapest Honvéd	Total		2	0	0	0	0	0	0	0	2	0
Career total			2	0	0	0	0	0	0	0	2	0
