= Attila Mocsi =

Hungarian footballer (born 2000)

Personal information
- Date of birth: 29 May 2000 (age 26)
- Place of birth: Sokolce, Slovakia
- Height: 1.83 m (6 ft 0 in)
- Position: Centre-back

Team information
- Current team: Çaykur Rizespor
- Number: 4

Youth career
- –2017: Győri ETO
- 2017–2020: Fehérvár

Senior career*
Years	Team	Apps	(Gls)
2018–2020	Fehérvár	1	(0)
2020	→ Budaörsi SC (loan)	9	(0)
2020–2022	Szombathelyi Haladás	54	(2)
2022–2023	Zalaegerszeg	43	(0)
2023–	Çaykur Rizespor	87	(4)

International career^{‡}
2017	Hungary U17	7	(0)
2017–2020	Hungary U19	6	(1)
2020–2022	Hungary U21	13	(0)
2022–	Hungary	3	(0)
- * Club domestic league appearances and goals as of 10 June 2026 ‡ National team caps and goals as of 16 November 2025

Attila Mocsi (born 29 May 2000) is a professional footballer who plays as a centre-back for Süper Lig club Çaykur Rizespor. Born in Slovakia, he plays for the Hungary national team.

== Club career ==
=== Haladás ===
On 24 July 2020, he was signed by Nemzeti Bajnokság II club Szombathelyi Haladás. On 23 August 2020, he scored his first in a 2–2 draw against Vasas SC at the Illovszky Rudolf Stadion. On 31 January 2021, he scored a goal against Gyirmót FC Győr at Haladás Sportkomplexum. However, the match was won by the away team 3–1. In the 2020–21 Nemzeti Bajnokság II season he made 34 appearances.

=== Zalaegerszeg ===
On 17 January 2022, he was signed by Nemzeti Bajnokság I club Zalaegerszegi TE. In an interview with Nemzeti Sport, he said that he owes a lot to Ricardo Moniz.

=== Çaykur Rizespor ===
On 26 August 2023, he was signed by Süper Lig club Çaykur Rizespor. Two days before signing to Çaykur Rizespor the club sent a private plane to take Mocsi to Turkey. In an interview with Nemzeti Sport, Mocsi said that the Süper Lig is strong; therefore, everything is given to him to develop. He scored his first goal on his first match in the 2023–24 Süper Lig season in a 3–2 victory against Trabzonspor at the Papara Park on 26 August 2023. In December 2023, he suffered an ankle injury. On 13 January 2024, he scored the winning goal in a 1–0 victory over Adana Demirspor on the 20th match day of the 2023–24 Süper Lig.

== International career ==
Mocsi was called up to the senior Hungary squad for Nations League matches against Germany (away) and Italy (home) on 23 and 26 September 2022 respectively.

Mocsi made his senior international debut on 26 March 2024 in a friendly against Kosovo.

== Career statistics ==
=== Club ===
As of match played 28 February 2026

Appearances and goals by club, season and competition
Club	Season	League			Cup		Continental		Other		Total	
Club	Season	Division	Apps	Goals	Apps	Goals	Apps	Goals	Apps	Goals	Apps	Goals
Fehérvár	2017–18	Nemzeti Bajnokság I	1	0	2	0	0	0	0	0	3	0
Fehérvár	2018–19	Nemzeti Bajnokság I	0	0	0	0	0	0	0	0	0	0
Fehérvár	2019–20	Nemzeti Bajnokság I	0	0	0	0	0	0	0	0	0	0
Fehérvár	Total		1	0	2	0	0	0	0	0	3	0
Budaörsi (loan)	2019–20	Nemzeti Bajnokság II	9	0	—		—		—		9	0
Szombathelyi	2020–21	Nemzeti Bajnokság II	34	2	0	0	—		—		34	2
Szombathelyi	2021–22	Nemzeti Bajnokság II	20	0	0	0	—		—		20	0
Szombathelyi	Total		63	2	0	0	—		—		63	2
Zalaegerszegi	2021–22	Nemzeti Bajnokság I	9	0	—		—		—		9	0
Zalaegerszegi	2022–23	Nemzeti Bajnokság I	30	0	6	1	—		—		36	1
Zalaegerszegi	2023–24	Nemzeti Bajnokság I	9	0	0	0	2 (Note: Appearances in UEFA Europa Conference League)	0	—		11	0
Zalaegerszegi	Total		48	0	6	1	2	0	—		56	1
Çaykur Rizespor	2023–24	Süper Lig	29	2	1	0	—		—		30	2
Çaykur Rizespor	2024–25	Süper Lig	33	0	1	0	—		—		34	0
Çaykur Rizespor	2025–26	Süper Lig	18	1	3	0	—		—		21	1
Çaykur Rizespor	Total		80	3	5	0	—		—		85	3
Career total			192	5	13	1	2	0	0	0	207	6

=== International ===
As of match played 16 November 2025

Appearances and goals by national team and year
National team	Year	Apps	Goals
Hungary	2024	1	0
Hungary	2025	2	0
Total		3	0

== Honours ==
Zalaegerszeg

- Magyar Kupa: 2022–23
