= List of Hungarian football transfers winter 2025–26 =

This is a list of Hungarian football transfers for the 2025–26 winter transfer window. Only transfers featuring Nemzeti Bajnokság I are listed.

== Nemzeti Bajnokság I ==
Note: Flags indicate national team as has been defined under FIFA eligibility rules. Players may hold more than one non-FIFA nationality.

=== Debrecen ===
In:

No.	Pos.	Nation	Player
1	GK	HUN	Patrik Demjén (from MTK Budapest)
98	FW	NGR	Stephen Odey (free agent)

Out:

No.	Pos.	Nation	Player
1	GK	HUN	Ádám Varga (loan return to Ferencváros)
3	DF	HUN	Csaba Hornyák (on loan to Mezőkövesd)
42	FW	CIV	Yacouba Silue (on loan to (Serbia) OFK Beograd)
45	FW	HUN	Tamás Batai (on loan to Debreceni EAC)
74	FW	MLI	Pape Sissoko (loan return to (France) Reims)
90	FW	SUI	Dejan Djokic (loan return to (Switzerland) Sion)
—	FW	ESP	Erik Vázquez (to (Spain) Tudelano)

=== Diósgyőr ===
In:

No.	Pos.	Nation	Player
11	FW	GAM	Lamin Colley (on loan from Puskás Akadémia)
21	MF	HUN	Tamás Galántai (from (Italy) Torino Primavera)
23	MF	HUN	Milán Pető (on loan from Paks)
32	FW	NGR	Peter Ambrose (on loan from (Scotland) Aberdeen)
62	DF	KOS	Lirim Kastrati (free agent)
68	FW	HUN	Zétény Varga (on loan from Ferencváros II)

Out:

No.	Pos.	Nation	Player
7	FW	NED	Elton Acolatse (to Ferencváros)
10	FW	HUN	Gábor Jurek (on loan to MTK Budapest)
11	DF	HUN	Dániel Gera (to (Iran) Persepolis)
21	DF	HUN	Levente Babós (loan return to Újpest)
88	MF	HUN	Miron Mucsányi (loan return to Újpest)
—	MF	CIV	Christ Tiéhi (to (Israel) Maccabi Bnei Reineh, previously on loan at (Czech Republic) Baník Ostrava)

=== Ferencváros ===
In:

No.	Pos.	Nation	Player
4	DF	ARG	Mariano Gómez (from (Switzerland) Zürich)
5	MF	GUI	Naby Keïta (from (Germany) Werder Bremen, previously on loan)
7	FW	NED	Elton Acolatse (from Diósgyőr)
14	DF	HUN	Attila Osváth (from Paks)
17	MF	ROU	Marius Corbu (from (Cyprus) APOEL)
19	FW	CRO	Franko Kovačević (from (Slovenia) Celje)

Out:

No.	Pos.	Nation	Player
7	FW	AUS	Daniel Arzani (on loan to (Australia) Melbourne City)
19	FW	HUN	Barnabás Varga (to (Greece) AEK Athens)
64	MF	HUN	Alex Tóth (to (England) Bournemouth)

=== Győr ===
In:

No.	Pos.	Nation	Player
14	FW	HUN	Márton Szép (from (Germany) Bayer Leverkusen U19)

Out:

No.	Pos.	Nation	Player
37	DF	SVK	Norbert Urblík (on loan to (Slovakia) ŠTK Šamorín)

=== Kazincbarcika ===
In:

No.	Pos.	Nation	Player
4	DF	HUN	Zsombor Nagy (from Zalaegerszeg)
9	FW	BIH	Semir Smajlagić (from (Malta) Hamrun Spartans)
12	FW	USA	Eduvie Ikoba (from (Portugal) Académico de Viseu)
17	DF	HUN	Vince Nyíri (from Zalaegerszeg)
21	DF	POL	Kacper Radkowski (from (Republic of Ireland) Waterford)
27	FW	UKR	Maksym Pukhtieiev (from (Slovakia) ŠTK Šamorín)
89	GK	HUN	Botond Kocsis (on loan from Győr II)
91	DF	HUN	János Ferenczi (from (Romania) Csíkszereda)
96	FW	HUN	Milán Klausz (on loan from MTK Budapest)
—	MF	HUN	Péter Sebők (from (Switzerland) Winterthur U19)

Out:

No.	Pos.	Nation	Player
3	DF	ARM	Varazdat Haroyan (free agent)
7	FW	HUN	Gábor Makrai (on loan to Ajka)
17	FW	HUN	Dániel Prosser (to Tatabánya)
38	MF	HUN	Bence Sós (loan return to (Serbia) TSC)
44	DF	HUN	Attila Szujó (to Haladás MÁV)
72	GK	HUN	Gergő Bánfalvi (loan return to Vasas)

=== Kisvárda ===
In:

No.	Pos.	Nation	Player
26	DF	SRB	Nikola Radmanovac (from (China) Qingdao Hainiu)
80	MF	FRA	Hianga'a Mbock (from (France) Grenoble)
—	GK	HUN	Zsombor Papp (from Gyirmót)

Out:

No.	Pos.	Nation	Player
2	DF	NGR	Stephen Adayilo (to (Slovakia) MFK Zvolen)
4	DF	CRO	Bernardo Matić (free agent)
18	DF	HUN	Kevin Körmendi (on loan to Tiszakécske)
66	MF	HUN	Maxim Osztrovka (on loan to Karcag)

=== MTK Budapest ===
In:

No.	Pos.	Nation	Player
26	DF	LTU	Vilius Armalas (from (Lithuania) Hegelmann)
39	FW	HUN	Gábor Jurek (on loan from Diósgyőr)
47	GK	HUN	Krisztián Hegyi (on loan from (England) West Ham United)
80	MF	SLO	Adrian Zeljković (on loan from (Czech Republic) Viktoria Plzeň)
—	FW	HUN	Milán Klausz (from Zalaegerszeg)
—	FW	HUN	Dániel Zsóri (from (Romania) UTA Arad)

Out:

No.	Pos.	Nation	Player
1	GK	HUN	Patrik Demjén (to Debrecen)
5	DF	HUN	Roland Lehoczky (to BVSC-Zugló)
16	FW	HUN	Péter Törőcsik (on loan to BVSC-Zugló)
22	DF	HUN	Zsombor Bévárdi (to Paks)
28	MF	HUN	Patrik Szűcs (on loan to (Slovakia) Komárno)
—	FW	HUN	Milán Klausz (on loan to Kazincbarcika)
—	FW	HUN	Dániel Zsóri (on loan to Kozármisleny)

=== Nyíregyháza ===
In:

No.	Pos.	Nation	Player
9	FW	AUT	Marko Kvasina (from (Czech Republic) Slovácko)
24	DF	MKD	Vane Jovanov (from (Croatia) Varaždin)
26	FW	NGR	Muhamed Tijani (on loan from (Czech Republic) Slavia Prague, previously on loan at (Czech Republic) Sigma Olomouc)
57	GK	HUN	Martin Dala (on loan from Puskás Akadémia)
98	DF	MNE	Meldin Drešković (on loan from (Germany) Darmstadt 98)

Out:

No.	Pos.	Nation	Player
3	DF	SRB	Ranko Jokić (to (Serbia) Radnički Niš)
4	DF	HUN	Áron Alaxai (on loan to Paks)
8	MF	TTO	Dantaye Gilbert (to (Czech Republic) Dukla Prague)
21	FW	HUN	Kevin Varga (to Budapest Honvéd)
41	DF	GRE	Stefanos Evangelou (to (Slovenia) Aluminij)
—	DF	HUN	Olivér Tamás (to Paks, previously on loan at BVSC-Zugló)
—	FW	GAM	Modou Lamin Marong (to (Slovakia) ŠTK Šamorín, previously on loan)

=== Paks ===
In:

No.	Pos.	Nation	Player
3	DF	HUN	Áron Alaxai (on loan from Nyíregyháza)
6	DF	HUN	Olivér Tamás (from Nyíregyháza, previously on loan at BVSC-Zugló)
11	DF	HUN	Zsombor Bévárdi (from MTK Budapest)

Out:

No.	Pos.	Nation	Player
10	FW	HUN	Zsolt Haraszti (on loan to Fehérvár)
11	DF	HUN	Attila Osváth (to Ferencváros)
23	MF	HUN	Milán Pető (on loan to Diósgyőr)
—	DF	HUN	Zalán Debreceni (to Budafok, previously on loan at Mezőkövesd)
—	FW	HUN	Alen Skribek (to Zalaegerszeg, previously on loan)

=== Puskás Akadémia ===
In:

No.	Pos.	Nation	Player
30	MF	HUN	Zsolt Magyar (from Csákvár)

Out:

No.	Pos.	Nation	Player
9	FW	GAM	Lamin Colley (on loan to Diósgyőr)
17	DF	CZE	Patrizio Stronati (to Újpest)
57	GK	HUN	Martin Dala (on loan to Nyíregyháza)
99	FW	HUN	Zoárd Nagy (on loan to (Romania) Csíkszereda)
—	MF	HUN	Gergő Ominger (on loan to BVSC-Zugló, previously on loan at Fehérvár)

=== Újpest ===
In:

No.	Pos.	Nation	Player
2	DF	HUN	Gergő Bodnár (from Zalaegerszeg)
10	MF	GER	Arne Maier (from (Germany) FC Augsburg)
19	FW	SLO	Nejc Gradišar (on loan from (Egypt) Al Ahly)
27	FW	HUN	Ábel Krajcsovics (from Zalaegerszeg)
77	MF	HUN	Noah Fenyő (on loan from (Germany) Eintracht Frankfurt)
94	DF	CZE	Patrizio Stronati (from Puskás Akadémia)

Out:

No.	Pos.	Nation	Player
3	DF	POR	André Duarte (to (Romania) FCSB)
6	MF	POL	Damian Rasak (on loan to (Poland) GKS Katowice)
10	MF	HUN	Mátyás Tajti (to (Romania) Csíkszereda)
15	DF	POR	Tiago Gonçalves (on loan to (Italy) Mantova)
26	MF	HUN	Bálint Geiger (on loan to Fehérvár)
32	FW	ROU	George Ganea (to (Romania) ASA Târgu Mureș)
—	GK	HUN	Olivér Svékus (on loan to Tiszafüred, previously on loan at Fehérvár)
—	DF	HUN	Levente Babós (on loan to BVSC-Zugló, previously on loan at Diósgyőr)

=== Zalaegerszeg ===
In:

No.	Pos.	Nation	Player
2	DF	USA	Aiden Harangi (from (Germany) Eintracht Frankfurt II, previously on loan at (United States) San Diego FC)
3	DF	PAR	Fernando Vera (from (Brazil) Corinthians U20)
7	FW	HUN	Alen Skribek (from Paks, previously on loan)
15	MF	ARG	Nicolás Elosú (from (Argentina) Racing Club II)
17	MF	BRA	Guilherme Teixeira (from (Brazil) Juventude U20)
19	MF	HUN	Viktor Petrók (from Budapest Honvéd)
20	DF	POR	André Ferreira (from (Portugal) Braga B)
23	FW	BRA	Maxsuell (from (Brazil) Nova Iguaçu, previously on loan)
27	FW	HUN	Ábel Krajcsovics (from Budapest Honvéd, previously on loan)
32	FW	ARG	Lucas Alfonso (from (Argentina) Talleres II)
33	DF	BRA	Diogo Silva (from (Brazil) Vitória U20)
47	FW	FRA	Queyrell Tchicamboud (from (Austria) Juniors OÖ)
55	DF	NGR	Akpe Victory (from (Lithuania) Banga Gargždai)
80	FW	BRA	Marlon Santos (from (Brazil) Juventude U20)
99	DF	HUN	Zétény Garai (from Ajka)

Out:

No.	Pos.	Nation	Player
2	DF	HUN	Gergő Bodnár (to Újpest)
3	DF	HUN	Zsombor Nagy (to Kazincbarcika)
17	DF	HUN	Vince Nyíri (to Kazincbarcika)
19	FW	HUN	Milán Klausz (to MTK Budapest)
27	FW	HUN	Ábel Krajcsovics (to Újpest)
56	DF	BRA	Diego Borges (to (United States) Sporting Kansas City)
67	MF	HUN	Balázs Bakti (on loan to (Slovenia) Nafta 1903)

== See also ==
- 2025–26 Nemzeti Bajnokság I
