= 2025–26 MTK Budapest FC season =

MTK
2025–26 season
- Manager: Máté Pinezits (From 21 December 2025); Dávid Horváth (Until 20 December 2025)
- Stadium: Hidegkuti Nándor Stadion
- Nemzeti Bajnokság I: 10th
- Magyar Kupa: Round of 16
- Top goalscorer: League: Á. Molnár (9); All: Á. Molnár (9)
- Highest home attendance: 4,872 (v Ferencváros, Nemzeti Bajnokság, R23, 23 February 2026)
- Lowest home attendance: 1,714 (v Mezőkövesd, Magyar Kupa, Round of 32, 29 October 2025)
- Average home league attendance: 3,070
- Biggest win: 6 goals, (7–1) v Siófok (A), Magyar Kupa, Round of 64, 13 September 2025
- Biggest defeat: 5 goals, (2–7) v Győri ETO (H), Nemzeti Bajnokság, R4, 17 August 2025
- All statistics correct as of 15 May 2026.

The 2025–26 season is MTK Budapest Football Club's 121st competitive season, 3rd consecutive season in the Nemzeti Bajnokság I and 129th year in existence as a football club. In addition to the domestic league, MTK participated in this season's editions of the Magyar Kupa.

== Kits ==
Supplier: Nike / Sponsor: Tippmix

Home	Home alt.	Away	Away alt.	Third

Goalkeeper^{1}	Goalkeeper^{2}

== First team squad ==
As of 3 February 2026

Note: Flags indicate national team as defined under FIFA eligibility rules; some limited exceptions apply. Players may hold more than one non-FIFA nationality.

No.	Pos.	Nation	Player
1	GK	HUN	Patrik Demjén
2	DF	HUN	Benedek Varju
3	DF	HUN	János Szépe
4	DF	GEO	Ilia Beriashvili
5	DF	HUN	Roland Lehoczky
6	MF	HUN	Mihály Kata (captain)
7	FW	HUN	Ádin Molnár
8	MF	HUN	Hunor Németh (on loan from (Denmark) Copenhagen)
10	MF	HUN	István Bognár
11	FW	BIH	Marin Jurina
12	MF	HUN	Domonkos Bene
14	MF	HUN	Artúr Horváth
15	DF	HUN	Imre Széles
16	MF	HUN	Péter Törőcsik
17	FW	SVK	Róbert Polievka

No.	Pos.	Nation	Player
18	FW	HUN	Krisztián Németh
20	FW	HUN	Zalán Kerezsi (on loan from (Hungary) Puskás Akadémia)
21	MF	HUN	István Átrok
22	DF	HUN	Zsombor Bévárdi
23	MF	CZE	Jakub Plšek
24	GK	HUN	Tamás Fadgyas
25	DF	HUN	Tamás Kádár
26	DF	LTU	Vilius Armalas
27	DF	HUN	Patrik Kovács
28	FW	HUN	Patrik Szűcs
29	GK	HUN	József Balázs
30	DF	HUN	Viktor Vitályos
31	MF	HUN	Domonkos Bene
—	MF	SLO	Adrian Zeljković (on loan from (Czech Republic) Viktoria Plzeň)

== Transfers ==
=== Summer ===
In
Date	No.	Pos.	Nat.	Player	Moving from	Fee	Ref.
27 May 2025	23	FW	Czech Republic	Jakub Plšek	Puskás Akadémia	Free	
11 June 2025	3	DF	Hungary	János Szépe	Győr	Undisclosed	
11 June 2025	15	DF	Hungary	Imre Széles	Kisvárda	Undisclosed	
19 June 2025	21	MF	Hungary	István Átrok	Budapest Honvéd (NB II)	Undisclosed	
7 July 2025	24	GK	Hungary	Tamás Fadgyas	Kazincbarcika	Undisclosed	
29 July 2025	30	DF	Hungary	Viktor Vitályos	Puskás Akadémia	Undisclosed	

Loaned from
Date	No.	Pos.	Nat.	Player	Moving from	Until	Ref.
24 July 2025	8	MF	Hungary	Hunor Németh	Copenhagen	30 June 2026	
12 August 2025	20	FW	Hungary	Zalán Kerezsi	Puskás Akadémia	30 June 2026	

Out
Date	No.	Pos.	Nat.	Player	Moving to	Fee	Ref.
8 June 2025	7	MF	Hungary	Zoltán Stieber	TBD	Contracts expire	
20 June 2025		DF	Ukraine	Viktor Hey	Vasas (NB II)	Contracts expire	
30 June 2025	3	DF	Serbia	Nemanja Antonov	Nyíregyháza	Free	
4 July 2025	26	MF	Hungary	Gergő Szőke	Kazincbarcika	Undisclosed	
4 July 2025	5	DF	Hungary	Zsombor Nagy	MTK	Free	
25 July 2025	8	MF	Hungary	Márk Kosznovszky	Portsmouth	Undisclosed	
30 August 2025	9	FW	Hungary	Rajmund Molnár	Pogoń Szczecin	Undisclosed	

Out on loan
Date	No.	Pos.	Nat.	Player	Moving to	Loan date	Ref.
21 June 2025		MF	Hungary	Gábor Stumpf	Budafok (NB II)	30 June 2026	
25 June 2025		MF	Hungary	Botond Herczeg	Budafok (NB II)	30 June 2026	
1 July 2025		MF	Hungary	Sámuel Bakó	Kozármisleny (NB II)	30 June 2026	
11 July 2025	12	GK	Hungary	Adrián Csenterics	Mérida (Primera Federación)	30 June 2026	
16 July 2025		FW	Hungary	Noel Kenesei	OH Leuven (Belgian Pro League)	30 June 2026	
4 August 2025	20	FW	Hungary	Mátyás Kovács	Košice (Slovak First Football League)	30 June 2026	

=== Winter ===
In
Date	No.	Pos.	Nat.	Player	Moving from	Fee	Ref.
21 December 2025	TBD	DF	Lithuania	Vilius Armalas	Hegelmann	Undisclosed	

=== Contract extension ===
Date	No.	Pos.	Nat.	Player	Extension to	Ref.
4 August 2025	20	FW	Hungary	Mátyás Kovács	N/A	
15 November 2025	11	FW	Bosnia and Herzegovina	Marin Jurina	N/A	
21 November 2025	6	MF	Hungary	Mihály Kata	2030	
26 November 2025	7	FW	Hungary	Ádin Molnár	2029	

=== Managerial changes ===
Outgoing manager	Manner of departure	Date of vacancy	Position in table	Incoming manager	Date of appointment	Ref.
Dávid Horváth	Change of role	20 December 2025	9th	(Hungary) Máté Pinezits	21 December 2025	

== Friendlies ==
Win Draw Loss Fixtures

=== Pre-season ===
25 June 2025 Friendly	Olimpija Ljubljana (Slovenian I) (Slovenia)	3–3	MTK	Radenci, Slovenia
11:00 CEST (UTC+02:00)	Muhamedbegovic 10'; Durdov 46'; Motika 87'	Report	Kosznovszky 43'; Á. Molnár 72'; K. Németh 78'
Note: • MTK 1st half: Demjén — Szépe (Lehoczky (substituted on) ), Beriasvili (M. Kovács (substituted on) ), Kádár, P. Kovács (Bene (substituted on) ) — Kosznovszky, Kata (Törőcsik (substituted on) ), Plšek (Átrok (substituted on) ) — Bognár, Jurina, R. Molnár • MTK 2nd half: Demjén (Csenterics (substituted on) ) — Kádár, Széles, R. Molnár — Bévárdi, Kosznovszky, A. Horváth, Bognár — Á. Molnár, Jurina (P. Szűcs (substituted on) ) — K. Németh

28 June 2025 Friendly	Mura (Slovenian I) (Slovenia)	1–2	MTK	Radenci, Slovenia
18:00 CEST (UTC+02:00)	Vizinger 5'	Report	Szűcs 70'; Bognár 90' (pen.)
Note: • MTK 1st half: Demjén — Bévárdi, Beriashvili, Kádár, Széles — Kosznovszky, Kata, Plšek — Átrok, Jurina, R. Molnár • MTK 2nd half: Csenterics — Bévárdi (M. Kovács (substituted on) 60'), Szépe, Lehoczky, P. Kovács — Kosznovszky (Törőcsik (substituted on) 60'), A. Horváth, Bognár — Átrok (Szűcs (substituted on) 60'), Jurina (K. Németh (substituted on) 60'), Á. Molnár • Manager: D. Horváth

3 July 2025 Friendly	UTA Arad (Romanian I) (Romania)	1–3	MTK	Beltinci, Slovenia
11:30 CEST (UTC+02:00)	Dolny 53' (pen.)	Report	Jurina 10', 12'; Törőcsik 14'; Lehoczky (yellow card) 67'
Note: • MTK: Csenterics (Balázs (substituted on) 46') — M. Kovács (Bévárdi (substituted on) 75'), Beriashvili (Jádi (substituted on) 60'), Lehoczky (Kata (substituted on) 75'), Széles (P. Kovács (substituted on) 75') — Szűcs (Bognár (substituted on) 75'), A. Horváth (Plšek (substituted on) 75'), Törőcsik (Szépe (substituted on) 75'), R. Molnár (Á. Molnár (substituted on) 75') — Jurina (László (substituted on) 60'), K. Németh (Átrok (substituted on) 75') • Manager: D. Horváth

4 July 2025 Friendly	U. Craiova (Romanian I) (Romania)	1–0	MTK	Beltinci, Slovenia
11:00 CEST (UTC+02:00)	Baiaram 53'	Report	Á. Molnár (yellow card) 70'
Note: • MTK: Demjén — Bévárdi, Szépe, Kádár, P. Kovács – Kosznovszky, Kata (Jádi (substituted on) 60') — Bognár (M. Kovács (substituted on) 73'), Plšek, Á. Molnár — Átrok (László (substituted on) 73') • Manager: D. Horváth

12 July 2025 Friendly	MTK	2–1	Kecskemét (NB II)	Budapest
10:30 CEST (UTC+02:00)	Jurina 21'; R. Molnár 81' (pen.)	Report	Vágó 45'	Stadium: Sándor Károly Labdarúgó Akadémia
Note: • MTK: Fadgyas — Bévárdi (M. Kovács (substituted on) 70'), Beriashvili (Szépe (substituted on) 46'), Kádár (Lehoczky (substituted on) 70'), P. Kovács (Széles (substituted on) 60') — Kata (A. Horváth (substituted on) 60'), Kosznovszky (Átrok (substituted on) 60'), Plšek (P. Szűcs (substituted on) 70') — Bognár (Törőcsik (substituted on) 70'), Jurina, Á. Molnár (R. Molnár (substituted on) 60') • Manager: D. Horváth

16 July 2025 Friendly	MTK	1–0	Soroksár (NB II)	Budapest
11:00 CEST (UTC+02:00)	K. Németh 73'	Report		Stadium: Sándor Károly Labdarúgó Akadémia
Note: • MTK 1st half: Demjén — László, Szépe, Beriashvili, Széles — A. Horváth, Törőcsik — M. Kovács, Plšek, R. Molnár — Jurina • MTK 2nd half: Fadgyas — Bévárdi, Lehoczky, Kádár, P. Kovács — Kata, Törőcsik — M. Kovács, Átrok, Á. Molnár — K. Németh • Manager: D. Horváth

19 July 2025 Friendly	MTK	0–3	(Slovakia) Komárno (Slovak I)	Budapest
17:00 CEST (UTC+02:00)		Report	Ožvolda 13'; Bayemi 52'; Ganbayar 79'
Note: • MTK: Demjén — Szépe, Beriashvili, Kádár, P. Kovács — Kata, Plšek, R. Molnár — Bévárdi, Jurina (K. Németh (substituted on) 60'), Á. Molnár • Manager: D. Horváth

=== Mid-season ===
10 January 2026 Friendly	MTK	5–2	Kozármisleny (NB II)	Budapest
13:00 CEST	Jurina 31'; Kerezsi 45+7'; P. Kovács 55', 87'; Polievka 56'	Report	Zamostny 90+13'; R. Varga 79'	Stadium: Sándor Károly Labdarúgó Akadémia; Attendance: 0 (behind closed doors)
Note: 2x60 minutes playing time • MTK until 60th minutes: Hegyi — Varju, Beriashvili, Kádár, Vitályos — H. Németh, A. Horváth — Á. Molnár, Átrok, Kerezsi — Jurina • MTK from 61st minutes: Fadgyas — Bévárdi, Armalas, Szépe, Széles — Bene, Törőcsik, Polievka — P. Szűcs, K. Németh, P. Kovács • Manager: Pinezits

17 January 2026 Friendly	MTK	2–2	Videoton (NB II)	Budapest
13:00	Á. Molnár 39'; A. Horváth 88'	Report	Murka 8'; D. Németh 44'	Stadium: Sándor Károly Labdarúgó Akadémia, Training pitch Attendance: 0 (behind closed doors)
Note: • MTK: Hegyi — Varju, Beriashvili, Kádár, Vitályos — A. Horváth, H. Németh, Polievka — Kerezsi, Jurina, Á. Molnár • Manager: Pinezits

17 January 2026 Friendly	MTK	1–0	Ajka (NB II)	Budapest
15:00	K. Németh 19'	Report		Stadium: Sándor Károly Labdarúgó Akadémia, Training pitch Attendance: 0 (behind closed doors)
Note: • MTK: Fadgyas (Demjén (substituted on) 46') — Bévárdi (Jádi (substituted on) 75'), Vilius, Szépe, Széles — Bene, Törőcsik — P. Szűcs, Átrok (Nógrádi (substituted on) 75'), P. Kovács — K. Németh (Á. Molnár (substituted on) 75') • Manager: Pinezits

== Competitions ==
=== Overall record ===
In italics, we indicate the Last match and the Final position achieved in competition(s) that have not yet been completed.

Competition	First match	Last match	Starting round	Final position	Record							
Competition	First match	Last match	Starting round	Final position	Pld	W	D	L	GF	GA	GD	Win %
Nemzeti Bajnokság I	26 July 2025	15 May 2026	Matchday 1	10th	33	9	11	13	55	62	−7	27.27
Magyar Kupa	13 September 2025	11 February 2026	Round of 64	Round of 16	3	2	0	1	13	4	+9	66.67
Total					36	11	11	14	68	66	+2	30.56

Last updated: 15 May 2026
Source: Soccerway

=== Nemzeti Bajnokság I ===
==== League table ====
Pos	Team	Pld	W	D	L	GF	GA	GD	Pts	Qualification or relegation
8	Kisvárda	33	11	7	15	36	49	−13	40	
9	Nyíregyháza	33	10	10	13	47	57	−10	40	
10	MTK	33	9	11	13	55	62	−7	38	
11	Diósgyőr (R)	33	6	10	17	39	65	−26	28	Relegation to the Nemzeti Bajnokság II
12	Kazincbarcika (R)	33	6	4	23	31	70	−39	22	Relegation to the Nemzeti Bajnokság II

Source: Hungarian Football Federation (in Hungarian)
Rules for classification: 1) Points; 2) Matches won; 3) Goal difference; 4) Goals scored; 5) Head-to-head points; 6) Head-to-head goal difference; 7) Fair play ranking; 8) Drawing of lots.
(R) Relegated

==== Results summary ====
Overall								Home						Away					
Pld	W	D	L	GF	GA	GD	Pts	W	D	L	GF	GA	GD	W	D	L	GF	GA	GD
33	9	11	13	55	62	−7	38	7	4	6	37	29	+8	2	7	7	18	33	−15

Last updated: 15 May 2026.
Source: Soccerway

==== Results by round ====
A = Away; H = Home; W = Win; D = Draw; L = Loss

Round	1	2	3	4	5	6	7	8	9	10	11	12	13	14	15	16	17	18	19	20	21	22	23	24	25	26	27	28	29	30	31	32	33
Ground	H	A	H	H	H	A	H	H	A	H	A	A	H	A	A	A	H	A	A	H	A	H	H	A	H	A	H	A	A	H	A	H	A
Result	D	L	W	L	L	W	W	W	L	W	D	L	W	L	L	L	L	D	W	L	L	D	W	D	D	D	L	D	W	W	D	D	D
Position	9	9	5	8	9	8	5	5	5	4	6	7	5	6	7	8	8	9	8	8	8	9	9	9	10	10	10	10	10	9	10	10	10
Points	1	1	4	4	4	7	10	13	13	16	17	17	20	20	20	20	20	21	24	24	24	25	25	26	27	28	28	29	32	35	36	37	38
Manager	H	H	H	H	H	H	H	H	H	H	H	H	H	H	H	H	H	H	P	P	P	P	P	P	P	P	P	P	P	P	P	P	P

Updated to match(es) played on 15 May 2026. Source:
Notes:
Manager: • H Dávid Horváth • P Máté Pinezits

==== Matches ====
Win Draw Loss Fixtures Postponed

The draw for the 2025/26 season was held on 16 June 2025.

26 July 2025 1	MTK	1–1	Ferencváros	Budapest
20:15 CEST	R. Molnár 54'; P. Kovács (yellow card) 69'	Report	Joseph 44'; Keïta (yellow card) 94'	Stadium: Hidegkuti Nándor Stadion; Attendance: 4,285; Referee: Gergő Bogár; Assistant referees: István Albert, Georgiou Theodoros
Note: • MTK: Demjén — Szépe, Beriashvili, Kádár, P. Kovács — Bognár (A. Horváth (substituted on) 77'), Kata (c), Plšek — R. Molnár (Bévárdi (substituted on) 77'), Á. Molnár (H. Németh (substituted on) 86') — Jurina (K. Németh (substituted on) 89') • Manager: D. Horváth; Player of the match: Jonathan Levi, Ferencváros 7.7 • Best player of MTK: Mihály Kata and Jakub Plšek 7.4 each (Source:)

1 August 2025 2	Debrecen	1–0	MTK	Debrecen
20:00 CEST	Batik 56' (yellow card) 78'; Á. Varga (yellow card) 89'; T. Szűcs (yellow card) 90+4'; Bermejo (yellow card) 90+6'	Report	P. Kovács (yellow card) 39'; H. Németh (yellow card) 53'	Stadium: Nagyerdei Stadion; Attendance: 6,233; Referee: Ferenc Karakó; Assistant referees: Dániel Szalai, József Aradi
Note: • MTK: Demjén — P. Kovács (Széles (substituted on) 73'), Kádár, Beriashvili, Szépe (Bévárdi (substituted on) 73') — R. Molnár (Bognár (substituted on) 62'), Kata (c), Plšek, Á. Molnár (K. Németh (substituted on) 73') — Jurina, H. Németh (Átrok (substituted on) 62') • Manager: D. Horváth • Player of the match: Ádám Varga, Debrecen 9.1 • Best player of MTK: Mihály Kata 7.8

9 August 2025 3	MTK	5–0	Diósgyőr	Budapest
17:45 CEST	R. Molnár 7' (pen.), 32', 43' (pen.); Kata 28'; Átrok 79'	Report	Šaponjić (yellow card) 38'	Stadium: Hidegkuti Nándor Stadion; Attendance: 2,592; Referee: Mihály Káprály; Assistant referees: Dániel Szalai, Zoltán Horváth
Note: • MTK: Demjén — Bévárdi (V. Vitályos (substituted on) 71'), Szépe, Kádár, P. Kovács — H. Németh (Törőcsik (substituted on) 83'), Kata (c) (A. Horváth (substituted on) 83') — Á. Molnár, Bognár (Átrok (substituted on) 71'), R. Molnár (K. Németh (substituted on) 71') — Jurina • Manager: D. Horváth • Player of the match: Rajmund Molnár, MTK 10.0 • Best player of Diósgyőr: Bence Bárdos 6.9

17 August 2025 4	MTK	2–7	Győri ETO	Budapest
17:45 CEST	R. Molnár 31'; Kádár (yellow card) 39'; P. Kovács (yellow card) 43'; Jurina 60'; V. Vitályos (yellow card) 61' (yellow-red card) 65'	Report	Štefulj 15' (yellow card) 35'; Krpić 29'; Vitális 33'; Benbouali 45+2', 68'; Huszár 77'; Pyshchur 82'	Stadium: Hidegkuti Nándor Stadion; Attendance: 1,954; Referee: Attila Molnár; Assistant referees: Balázs Szert, József Aradi
Note: • MTK: Demjén — Bévárdi, Szépe, Kádár (Széles (substituted on) 46'), P. Kovács (V. Vitályos (substituted on) 46') — Kata (c), H. Németh (A. Horváth (substituted on) 46') — Á. Molnár (Lehoczky (substituted on) 67'), Bognár (Átrok (substituted on) 70'), R. Molnár — Jurina • Manager: D. Horváth • Player of the match: Ahmed Nadhir Benbouali, Győri ETO 9.3 • Best player of MTK: Marin Jurina 8.3

24 August 2025 5	MTK	2–3	Paks	Budapest
20:00 CEST	R. Molnár (yellow card) 33'; Szépe (yellow card) 40'; Átrok 59'; A. Horváth 66'; Széles (yellow card) 80'; Bognár (yellow card) 90'	Report	Vécsei 18'; Hahn 28' (pen.); Windecker 82' (pen.)	Stadium: Hidegkuti Nándor Stadion; Attendance: 2,376; Referee: Márió Zimmermann; Assistant referees: Ákos Berényi, Gergely Becséri
Note: • MTK: Demjén — Szépe (Á. Molnár (substituted on) 60'), Beriashvili, Kádár, Széles — A. Horváth (Polievka (substituted on) 84'), Bognár, Kata (c) — R. Molnár (Kerezsi (substituted on) 60'), Jurina (K. Németh (substituted on) 60'), Átrok (P. Szűcs (substituted on) 74') • Manager: D. Horváth • Player of the match: Ádám Kovácsik, Paks 8.6 • Best player of MTK: Artúr Horváth 8.0

30 August 2025 6	Újpest	1–2	MTK	Budapest
19:30 CEST	Matko 23'; Brodić (yellow card) 76'; Medeiros (yellow card) 90+1'	Report	Kata (yellow card) 38'; Lehoczky (yellow card) 54'; Kerezsi 55'; Bognár 84'	Stadium: Szusza Ferenc Stadion; Attendance: 6,769; Referee: Bence Csonka dr. Assistant referees: Péter Garai, Balázs Szert
Note: • MTK: Demjén — Lehoczky (Szépe (substituted on) 68'), Beriashvili, Kádár, P. Kovács — Kata (c), A. Horváth (Polievka (substituted on) 46') — Á. Molnár, Átrok (H. Németh (substituted on) 58'), Kerezsi (Bognár (substituted on) 68') — Jurina (K. Németh (substituted on) 79') • Manager: D. Horváth • Player of the match: Aljoša Matko, Újpest 8.2 • Best player of MTK: Ilia Beriashvili 7.9

21 September 2025 7	MTK	1–0	Zalaegerszeg	Budapest
20:00 CEST	P. Kovács (yellow card) 67'; Á. Molnár 75'; K. Németh (yellow card) 85'	Report	Csóka (yellow card) 40'; Peraza (yellow card) 67'; Szendrei (yellow card) 90+6'	Stadium: Hidegkuti Nándor Stadion; Attendance: 2,403; Referee: József Erdős; Assistant referees: Gergely Becséri, Ákos Berényi
Note: • MTK: Demjén — Varju, Szépe, Kádár, P. Kovács — Kata (c) — Á. Molnár (Kerezsi (substituted on) 88'), A. Horváth (H. Németh (substituted on) 88'), Bognár (Plšek (substituted on) 81'), Átrok (Polievka (substituted on) 62') — Jurina (K. Németh (substituted on) 62') • Manager: D. Horváth • Player of the match: Ádin Molnár, MTK 7.6 • Best player of Zalaegerszeg: Norbert Szendrei 7.4

28 September 2025 8	MTK	4–0	Kisvárda	Budapest
14:15 CEST	Matić 15' (o.g.); Kata (yellow card) 23'; Á. Molnár 31'; Kerezsi 58'; Bognár (yellow card) 70'; Polievka 71'; Varju (yellow card) 76'	Report	Lippai (yellow card) 49'; Popoola (yellow card) 56'; G. Molnár (yellow card) 76'	Stadium: Hidegkuti Nándor Stadion; Attendance: 2,571; Referee: Péter Zierkelbalch; Assistant referees: István Szécsényi, Dániel Szalai
Note: • MTK: Demjén — Varju, Szépe, Kádár (V. Vitályos (substituted on) 83'), P. Kovács — Plšek, Kata (c) (Bognár (substituted on) 64') — Á. Molnár, Bognár (H. Németh (substituted on) 72'), Kerezsi (Jurina (substituted on) 83') — Polievka (K. Németh (substituted on) 72') • Manager: D. Horváth • Player of the match: Ádin Molnár, MTK 8.4 • Best player of Kisvárda: Ridwan Popoola 7.4

3 October 2025 9	Kazincbarcika	3–1	MTK	Mezőkövesd
20:00 CEST	Kártik 12' (pen.); Meshack 19'; Šlogar 45+1'; Sós (yellow card) 63'	Report	Á. Molnár (yellow card) 63'; K. Németh 90+1'	Stadium: Városi Stadion; Attendance: 532; Referee: Imre Kovács; Assistant referees: Zoltán Horváth, Dávid Rózsa
Note: • MTK: Demjén — Varju, Kádár (Szépe (substituted on) 46'), Széles (P. Kovács (substituted on) 46') — Á. Molnár (Átrok (substituted on) 74'), Kata (c), Plšek, H. Németh (V. Vitályos (substituted on) 46'), Kerezsi — Bognár, Polievka (K. Németh (substituted on) 46') • Manager: D. Horváth • Player of the match: Martin Šlogar, Kazincbarcika 7.9 • Best player of MTK: Krisztián Németh 7.6

18 October 2025 10	MTK	5–1	Nyíregyháza	Budapest
14:00 CEST	Jurina 18'; Á. Molnár 30', 55'; Kata (yellow card) 52'; Bognár 69'; P. Kovács 88'	Report	Májer (yellow card) 17'; Manner 36'; Farkas (yellow card) 74'; Benczenleitner (yellow card) 77'	Stadium: Hidegkuti Nándor Stadion; Attendance: 2,841; Referee: Marcell Derdák; Assistant referees: Norbert Bornemissza, József Aradi
Note: • MTK: Demjén — Varju, Beriashvili, Kádár, P. Kovács — A. Horváth, Kata (c (P. Szűcs (substituted on) 84') — Á. Molnár (H. Németh (substituted on) 77'), Bognár (Polievka (substituted on) 81'), Kerezsi (Átrok (substituted on) 77') — Jurina (V. Vitályos (substituted on) 77') • Manager: D. Horváth • Player of the match: Ádin Molnár, MTK 8.8 • Best player of Nyíregyháza: Balázs Manner 7.3

25 October 2025 11	Puskás Akadémia	1–1	MTK	Felcsút
14:30 CEST	Markgráf (red card) 6'; Kern 18'; Maceiras (yellow card) 62'	Report	Beriashvili (yellow card) 16'; P. Kovács (yellow card) 49'; Átrok 72'; Á. Molnár (yellow card) 90+2'	Stadium: Pancho Aréna; Attendance: 1,387; Referee: Bence Csonka dr. Assistant referees: Georgiou Theodors, Bence Belicza
Note: • MTK: Demjén — Varju, Beriashvili (Bévárdi (substituted on) 64'), Kádár (Szépe (substituted on) 90+2'), P. Kovács (Átrok (substituted on) 64') — Kata (c), A. Horváth (Polievka (substituted on) 64') — Á. Molnár, Bognár, Kerezsi — Jurina • Manager: D. Horváth • Player of the match: Benedek Varju, MTK 7.6 • Best player of Puskás Akadémia: Péter Szappanos 7.6

1 November 2025 12	Ferencváros	4–1	MTK	Budapest
20:00 CET	Gartenmann (yellow card) 7' (goal) 19'; Szalai 70'; B. Varga 80'; B. Nagy 82'	Report	Cadu 89' (o.g.)	Stadium: Ferencváros Stadion; Attendance: 8,715; Referee: Ferenc Karakó; Assistant referees: Balázs Szert, Dávid Rózsa
Note: • MTK: Demjén — Varju, Beriashvili, Kádár (Szépe (substituted on) 46'), V. Vitályos (Átrok (substituted on) 38') — A. Horváth (Plšek (substituted on) 62'), Kata (c) — Á. Molnár, Bognár (H. Németh (substituted on) 74'), Kerezsi — Jurina (K. Németh (substituted on) 62') • Manager: D. Horváth • Player of the match: Gábor Szalai, Ferencváros 8.1 • Best player of MTK: Patrik Demjén 8.0

9 November 2025 13	MTK	3–0	Debrecen	Budapest
12:45 CET	Átrok 38'; Bognár 43'; Á. Molnár 59'; Kata (yellow card) 72'; Kerezsi (yellow card) 83'	Report	M. Szécsi (yellow card) 12'; Dacosta (yellow card) 54'; Dzsudzsák (yellow card) 59'; Youga (yellow card) 85'	Stadium: Hidegkuti Nándor Stadion; Attendance: 3,894; Referee: Attila Molnár; Assistant referees: István Albert, István Szécsényi
Note: • MTK: Demjén — Varju, Beriashvili, Kádár, P. Kovács — Kata (c) (Polievka (substituted on) 75'), A. Horváth — Á. Molnár (Kerezsi (substituted on) 60'), Bognár (Plšek (substituted on) 60'), Átrok (H. Németh (substituted on) 80') — Jurina (K. Németh (substituted on) 75') • Manager: D. Horváth • Player of the match: István Átrok, MTK 9.0 • Best player of Debrecen: Balázs Dzsudzsák 8.1

23 November 2025 14	Diósgyőr	4–0	MTK	Miskolc
18:30 CET	Babos 25'; Tamás 46'; Acolatse 68' (pen.); A. Keita 77'; Bényei (yellow card) 88'	Report	Beriashvili (red card) 66'; Plšek (yellow card) 70'; K. Németh (yellow card) 76'	Stadium: Diósgyőri Stadion; Attendance: 2,205; Referee: Imre Kovács; Assistant referees: Norbert Bornemissza, Bence Belicza
Note: • MTK: Demjén — Varju, Beriashvili, Kádár, P. Kovács — Kata (c) (Törőcsik (substituted on) 43'), A. Horváth (Szépe (substituted on) 69') — Á. Molnár (Polievka (substituted on) 60'), Plšek, Átrok (Kerezsi (substituted on) 69') — Jurina (K. Németh (substituted on) 46') • Manager: D. Horváth • Player of the match: Elton Acolatse, Diósgyőr 10.0 • Best player of MTK: Mihály Kata 6.8

29 November 2025 15	Győri ETO	3–0	MTK	Győr
16:15 CET	Benbouali 45'; Vitális (yellow card) 66'; Bánáti 81'; Gavrić 90+1'	Report	H. Németh (red card) 43'	Stadium: ETO Park; Attendance: 4,220; Referee: József Erdős; Assistant referees: Balázs Buzás, Bence Belicza
Note: • MTK: Demjén — Varju (P. Szűcs (substituted on) 83'), Szépe, Kádár, P. Kovács — A. Horváth, Plšek, H. Németh — Á. Molnár (Bévárdi (substituted on) 72'), K. Németh (c) (Jurina (substituted on) 64'), Átrok (Kerezsi (substituted on) 46') • Manager: D. Horváth • Player of the match: Paul Anton, Győri ETO 8.9 • Best player of MTK: Tamás Kádár 7.5

6 December 2025 16	Paks	3–1	MTK	Paks
17:00 CET	Osváth 20' (yellow card) 53'; Szekszárdi (yellow card) 40'; Böde 67', 69'; Papp (yellow card) 87'	Report	Átrok (yellow card) 34'; Á. Molnár (yellow card) 38'; A. Horváth (yellow card) 46'; Polievka 55'	Stadium: Fehérvári úti Stadion; Attendance: 2,011; Referee: Ferenc Karakó; Assistant referees: Georgiou Theodoros, Péter Garai
Note: • MTK: Demjén — Varju (Szépe (substituted on) 73'), Beriashvili, Kádár (c), P. Kovács — A. Horváth (Lehoczky (substituted on) 86'), Plšek — Á. Molnár (Bévárdi (substituted on) 73'), Átrok (Törőcsik (substituted on) 79'), Polievka (P. Szűcs (substituted on) 73') — Jurina • Manager: D. Horváth • Player of the match: Dániel Böde, Paks 7.7 • Best player of MTK: Róbert Polievka 7.3

13 December 2025 17	MTK	3–4	Újpest	Budapest
19:00 CET	Lacoux 12' (o.g.); Törőcsik 68'; H. Németh 81'; Plšek (yellow card) 88'; Jurina (yellow card) 90'	Report	João Nunes (yellow card) 41'; Matko 45', 77'; P. Kovács 53' (o.g.); Kaczvinszki (yellow card) 80'; Kr. Horváth 85'	Stadium: Hidegkuti Nándor Stadion; Attendance: 3,721; Referee: Mihály Káprály; Assistant referees: István Albert, Bence Belicza
Note: • MTK: Demjén — Varju, Beriashvili, Kádár (c), P. Kovács (Törőcsik (substituted on) 58') — Plšek, A. Horváth (Szépe (substituted on) 58'), H. Németh — Á. Molnár (Jurina (substituted on) 75'), Polievka, Átrok • Manager: D. Horváth • Player of the match: Aljoša Matko, Újpest 8.1 • Best player of MTK: Péter Törőcsik 7.9

20 December 2025 18	Zalaegerszeg	1–1	MTK	Zalaegerszeg
13:00 CET	Bakti (yellow card) 63'; Skribek (penalty missed) 82'; Cs. Papp (yellow card) 89'; Klausz 90+1'	Report	Á. Molnár 29' (yellow card) 42'; Beriashvili (yellow card) 81'; K. Németh (yellow card) 90+3'; Fadgyas (yellow card) 90+4'	Stadium: ZTE Arena; Attendance: 2,350; Referee: Bence Csonka dr. Assistant referees: Balázs Szalai, Péter Ország
Note: • MTK: Fadgyas — Varju, Beriashvili, Kádár (c), Szépe — Plšek, Törőcsik (Kerezsi (substituted on) 64'), H. Németh (P. Kovács (substituted on) 79') — Á. Molnár (A. Horváth (substituted on) 64'), Polievka (K. Németh (substituted on) 85'), Átrok (Bévárdi (substituted on) 64') • Manager: D. Horváth • Player of the match: Bence Várkonyi, Zalaegerszeg 8.0 • Best player of MTK: Tamás Fadgyas 7.6

24 January 2026 19	Kisvárda	2–3	MTK	Kisvárda
15:00 CET	Á. Molnár 10', 74' (pen.); Popoola (yellow card) 72'; Lippai 82' (o.g.)	Report	Bíró 28'; Szőr 79'	Stadium: Várkerti Stadion; Attendance: 1,250; Referee: Márton Rúsz; Assistant referees: Norbert Bornemissza, József Aradi
Note: • MTK: Hegyi — Varju (c), Beriashvili, Szépe, V. Vitályos — A. Horváth, H. Németh (Armalas (substituted on) 85') — Kerezsi (Kata (substituted on) 63'), Átrok (Jurek (substituted on) 63'), Á. Molnár (P. Kovács (substituted on) 90+1') — Polievka (K. Németh (substituted on) 63') • Manager: Penezits • Player of the match: Ádin Molnár, MTK 8.1 • Best player of Kisvárda: Levente Szőr 7.9

31 January 2026 20	MTK	1–3	Kazincbarcika	Budapest
13:30 CET	Polievka 45'; Varju (yellow card) 48'; H. Németh (yellow card) 72'	Report	Rácz 3' (yellow card) 85'; Radkowski 44'; Šlogar (yellow card) 72'; Major 75'	Stadium: Hidegkuti Nándor Stadion; Attendance: 2,343; Referee: Tamás Bognár; Assistant referees: Vencel Tóth II, Péter Ország
Note: • MTK: Hegyi — Varju (c) (Bévárdi (substituted on) 77'), Beriashvili, Szépe, V. Vitályos — Kerezsi (Jurek (substituted on) 59'), A. Horváth (Kata (substituted on) 46'), H. Németh, Á. Molnár (Jurina (substituted on) 77') — Átrok (K. Németh (substituted on) 59'), Polievka • Manager: Penezits • Player of the match: Viktor Vitályos, MTK 8.5 • Best player of Kazincbarcika: László Rácz 7.9

8 February 2026 21	Nyíregyháza	4–2	MTK	Nyíregyháza
17:15 CET	Kvasina 13'; Manner (yellow card) 34'; Drešković (yellow card) 41'; Tijani 48', 81' (pen.); Temesvári 73'	Report	H. Németh 8'; Jurek 18'; V. Vitályos (yellow card) 41'	Stadium: Városi Stadion; Attendance: 3,577; Referee: Péter Zierkelbach; Assistant referees: Balázs Szert, Bence Belicza
Note: • MTK: Hegyi — Varju (Kerezsi (substituted on) 81'), Beriashvili, Kádár, V. Vitályos (P. Kovács (substituted on) 67') — Kata (c), Zeljković — Á. Molnár, H. Németh (Armalas (substituted on) 61'), Jurek (Átrok (substituted on) 81') — Polievka (Jurina (substituted on) 61') • Manager: Penezits • Player of the match: Attila Temesvári, Nyíregyháza 8.2 • Best player of MTK: Hunor Németh 7.7

14 February 2026 22	MTK	2–2	Puskás Akadémia	Budapest
14:45 CET	Kata (yellow card) 32'; Varju (yellow card) 33' (goal) 80'; Kádár (yellow card) 50'; Zeljković 60'; H. Németh (yellow card) 66'; Bognár (yellow card) 90+2'	Report	Zs. Nagy 15' (pen.), 35' (pen.); Soisalo (yellow card) 44'; Magyar (yellow card) 47'; L. Duarte (yellow card) 52'; Szolnoki (yellow card) 88'; Markgráf (yellow card) 90+1'	Stadium: Hidegkuti Nándor Stadion; Attendance: 1,500; Referee: Márton Rúsz; Assistant referees: Georgiou Theodoros, Péter Ország
Note: • MTK: Hegyi — Varju, Beriashvili, Kádár, V. Vitályos — Kata (c) (Bognár (substituted on) 74'), Zeljković — Jurek (Átrok (substituted on) 74'), H. Németh (A. Horváth (substituted on) 87'), Á. Molnár (Kerezsi (substituted on) 87') — Polievka (Jurina (substituted on) 67')• Manager: Penezits • Player of the match: Adrian Zeljković, MTK 7.9 • Best player of Puskás Akadémia: Péter Szappanos 7.6

23 February 2026 23	MTK	1–3	Ferencváros	Budapest
20:00 CET	Szépe (yellow card) 41'; H. Németh (yellow card) 69'; K. Németh (yellow card) 72'; Beriashvili (yellow card) 79'; Jurek 87'	Report	Kovačević 34'; Corbu (yellow card) 39'; Acolatse 57'; Madarász 74'; Osváth (yellow card) 76'	Stadium: Hidegkuti Nándor Stadion; Attendance: 4,872; Referee: Gergő Bogár; Assistant referees: Norbert Bornemissza, István Szécsényi
Note: • MTK: Hegyi — Szépe (Bognár (substituted on) 62'), Beriashvili, Kádár (c), V. Vitályos (P. Kovács (substituted on) 72') — Varju, A. Horváth (Zeljković (substituted on) 62'), H. Németh — Á. Molnár, Polievka (K. Németh (substituted on) 62'), Kerezsi (Jurek (substituted on) 72') • Manager: Penezits • Player of the match: Elton Acolatse, Ferencváros 8.2 • Best player of MTK: Gábor Jurek 7.7

27 February 2026 24	Debrecen	2–2	MTK	Debrecen
20:15 CET	Lang (yellow card) 49'; Batik (yellow card) 51'; Bárány 59', 69'; Youga (yellow card) 90+1'	Report	Jurina (yellow card) 37'; H. Németh 75'; Kerezsi 76'	Stadium: Nagyerdei Stadion; Attendance: 4,012; Referee: Mihály Káprály; Assistant referees: Dániel Szalai, Ákos Berényi
Note: • MTK: Hegyi — Armalas, Beriashvili, Kádár, V. Vitályos — Zeljković, Kata (c) (A. Horváth (substituted on) 85') — Á. Molnár (Kerezsi (substituted on) 62'), Bognár (H. Németh (substituted on) 71'), Jurek (Átrok (substituted on) 62') — Jurina (K. Németh (substituted on) 71') • Manager: Penezits • Player of the match: Tamás Szűcs, Debrecen 8.2 • Best player of MTK: Hunor Németh 7.7

8 March 2026 25	MTK	1–1	Diósgyőr	Budapest
13:30 CET	Kata (yellow card) 7'; Átrok 70'; V. Vitályos (yellow card) 73'; Kerezsi (yellow card) 73'	Report	Bárdos (yellow card) 10'; Colley 36'; Babos (yellow card) 73'; Holdampf (yellow card) 90+4'	Stadium: Hidegkuti Nándor Stadion; Attendance: 3,124; Referee: Tamás Bognár; Assistant referees: István Széchenyi, Dávid Rózsa
Note: • MTK: Hegyi — Armalas, Beriashvili, Kádár, V. Vitályos — Zeljković, Kata (c) — H. Németh (Kerezsi (substituted on) 46'), Bognár (Átrok (substituted on) 69'), Á. Molnár (Polievka (substituted on) 69') — Jurina (K. Németh (substituted on) 69') • Manager: Penezits • Player of the match: István Átrok, MTK 7.9 • Best player of Diósgyőr: Bence Bárdos 7.6

13 March 2026 26	Győri ETO	0–0	MTK	Győr
20:00 CEST		Report		Stadium: ETO Park; Attendance: 4,950; Referee: Gergő Bogár; Assistant referees: Balázs Szalai, Péter Garai
Note: • MTK: Hegyi — Armalas, Beriashvili, Kádár, V. Vitályos — Zeljković, Kata (c), Átrok (Jurek (substituted on) 55'), H. Németh (P. Kovács (substituted on) 55'), Kerezsi (A. Horváth (substituted on) 88') — Jurina (K. Németh (substituted on) 66') • Manager: Penezits • Player of the match: Márk Csinger, Győri ETO 8.5 • Best player of MTK: Ilia Beriashvili 7.6

20 March 2026 27	MTK	0–2	Paks	Budapest
20:00 CET		Report	Á. Szendrei 32'; Böde 83'	Stadium: Hidegkuti Nándor Stadion; Attendance: 3,522; Referee: Balázs Berke; Assistant referees: József Aradi, Tibor Csatári

4 April 2026 28	Újpest	2–2	MTK	Budapest
19:30 CEST	Matko 10'; Krajcsovics (yellow card) 37'; Kr. Horváth (yellow card) 78' (goal) 87' (pen.)	Report	Á. Molnár 23' (pen.); P. Kovács (yellow card) 85'; Kádár (yellow card) 87'; Jurek 90+5'	Stadium: Szusza Ferenc Stadion; Attendance: 5,131; Referee: Péter Zierkelbach; Assistant referees: Péter Garai, Dávid Rózsa
Note: • MTK: Hegyi — Armalas, Beriashvili, Kádár, P. Kovács — Zeljković, Kata (c) — Á. Molnár (Jurek (substituted on) 81'), Plšek (Kerezsi (substituted on) 70'), Átrok (H. Németh (substituted on) 70') — Jurina (Polievka (substituted on) 64') • Manager: Penezits • Player of the match: Aljoša Matko, Újpest 7.7 • Best player of MTK: Gábor Jurek 7.6

11 April 2026 29	MTK	3–0	Zalaegerszeg	Budapest
17:45 CEST	Kerezsi 50', 64'; Armalas (yellow card) 68'; Jurek 90'	Report		Stadium: Hidegkuti Nándor Stadion; Attendance: 2,928; Referee: Bence Csonka dr. Assistant referees: Georgiou Theodoros, Balázs Szalai

18 April 2026 30	MTK	2–1	Kisvárda	Budapest
17:00 CEST	Átrok 24'; K. Németh 90'	Report	Jovičić 90+2'	Stadium: Hidegkuti Nándor Stadion; Attendance: 2,497; Referee: Péter Zierkelbach; Assistant referees: Balázs Szert, István Szécsényi
Note: • MTK: Hegyi — Armalas, Beriashvili, Kádár, P. Kovács — Zeljković, Kata (c) — Á. Molnár (V. Vitályos (substituted on) 76'), H. Németh (Plšek (substituted on) 71'), Átrok (K. Németh (substituted on) 64') — Kerezsi (Jurek (substituted on) 64') • Manager: Penezits • Player of the match: Vilius Armalas, MTK 8.0 • Best player of Kisvárda: Aleksandar Jovičić 7.8

24 April 2026 31	Kazincbarcika	0–0	MTK	Miskolc
20:00 CEST	Könyves (yellow card) 22'; Rácz (yellow card) 49'	Report	Kata (yellow card) 58'	Stadium: Diósgyőri Stadion; Attendance: 891; Referee: Attila Molnár; Assistant referees: Bence Belicza, Dániel Szalai
Note: • MTK: Hegyi — Armalas (Varju (substituted on) 69'), Beriashvili, Kádár, P. Kovács — Kata (c), Zeljković — Jurek (Polievka (substituted on) 87'), H. Németh (Plšek (substituted on) 64'), Átrok (Á. Molnár (substituted on) 46') — Kerezsi (Jurina (substituted on) 69') • Manager: Penezits • Player of the match: Bence Juhász, Zalaegerszeg 8.0 • Best player of MTK: Tamás Kádár 7.9

2 May 2026 32	MTK	1–1	Nyíregyháza	Budapest
13:00 CEST	Kata (yellow card) 51'; H. Németh 53'; Armalas (yellow card) 67'	Report	M. Kovács (yellow card) 46'; Temesvári (yellow card) 65'; Tijani (yellow card) 71' (goal) 90' (pen.)	Stadium: Hidegkuti Nándor Stadion; Attendance: 3,485; Referee: Márió Zimmermann; Assistant referees: Ákos Berényi, Dávid Rózsa
Note: • MTK: Hegyi — Armalas, Beriashvili, Kádár, V. Vitályos — Zeljković, Kata — Á. Molnár (Vasiljević (substituted on) 88'), H. Németh (A. Horváth (substituted on) 79'), Átrok (Jurek (substituted on) 79') — K. Németh (c) (Plšek (substituted on) 86') • Manager: Penezits • Player of the match: Mihály Kata, MTK 8.4 • Best player of Nyíregyháza: Martin Dala 7.8

15 May 2026 33	Puskás Akadémia	2–2	MTK	Felcsút
20:00 CEST	Kern (yellow card) 29'; Okeke (yellow card) 69'; Fameyeh 80'; Szolnoki (yellow card) 90+1'; Lukács 90+5' (pen.)	Report	Zeljković (yellow card) 41'; Kádár (yellow card) 50'; Á. Molnár 59'; Kerezsi 82'	Stadium: Pancho Aréna; Attendance: 1,117; Referee: Ferenc Karakó; Assistant referees: Balázs Huszár, Viktor Nagy

Note: Based on the decision of the MLSZ Competition Committee, the right to choose the domestic place was changed in the 4th round and the 15th round of the Fizz League (Nemzeti Bajnokság I).
Source: MLSZ Adatbank

=== Magyar Kupa ===
13 September 2025 R64	Siófok (NB III)	1–7	MTK	Siófok
16:00 CEST	Á. Gruber 58' (yellow card) 66'; D. Rácz (yellow card) 89'	Report	K. Németh 14', 17', 74'; Polievka 22'; Bognár 31', 89'; Fiáth 75' (o.g.); Széles (yellow card) 88'	Stadium: Révész Géza utcai Stadion; Attendance: 350; Referee: Péter Zierkelbach; Assistant referees: Zsolt Király, Tamás Kulmann
Note: • MTK: Fadgyas — Bévárdi (Átrok (substituted on) 65'), Varju, Vitályos, Széles — Kata (c) (Plšek (substituted on) 46'), H. Németh (Jádi (substituted on) 79') — Kerezsi (K. László (substituted on) 46'), Bognár, Polievka (P. Szűcs (substituted on) 65') — K. Németh • Manager: D. Horváth

29 October 2025 R32	MTK	5–1	Mezőkövesd (NB II)	Budapest
20:00 CET	Átrok 13'; P. Kovács 34', 82'; Plšek 55'; K. Németh 69'	Report	Kata 5' (o.g.); Vidnyánszky (yellow card) 87'	Stadium: Hidegkuti Nándor Stadion; Attendance: 1,714; Referee: Gábor Iványi; Assistant referees: Vencel Tóth II, Gergő Vígh-Tarsonyi
Note: • MTK: Fadgyas — Bévárdi, Varju (Lehoczky (substituted on) 67'), Szépe, P. Kovács — H. Németh, Kata (c) (Plšek (substituted on) 46') — Átrok, Bognár (Polievka (substituted on) 57'), Kerezsi (Vitályos (substituted on) 46') — K. Németh (Törőcsik (substituted on) 72') • Manager: D. Horváth

11 February 2026 R16	MTK	1–2	Kecskemét (NB II)	Budapest
18:00 CET	Armalas 20'; Á. Molnár (yellow card) 64'	Report	M. Papp (yellow card) 7'; Czékus 10'; Derekas 23' (pen.); A. Szabó (yellow card) 51'	Stadium: Hidegkuti Nándor Stadion; Attendance: 1,926; Referee: Tamás Bognár; Assistant referees: Dávid Rózsa, Kevin Ring
Note: • MTK: Fadgyas — Varju, Armalas, Kádár, Vitályos (Zeljković (substituted on) 46') — A. Horváth, Kata (c) (Jurek (substituted on) 46') — Kerezsi (Á. Molnár (substituted on) 63'), Átrok (Polievka (substituted on) 72'), P. Kovács — Jurina (K. Németh (substituted on) 63') • Manager: D. Horváth

== See also ==
- List of MTK Budapest FC seasons
- Örökrangadó: local derby between Ferencváros and MTK Budapest
