= List of Hungarian football transfers summer 2026 =

This is a list of Hungarian football transfers for the 2026 summer transfer window. Only transfers featuring Nemzeti Bajnokság I are listed.

== Nemzeti Bajnokság I ==
Note: Flags indicate national team as has been defined under FIFA eligibility rules. Players may hold more than one non-FIFA nationality.

=== ETO Győr ===
In:

No.	Pos.	Nation	Player
7	MF	NGR	Peter Agba (on loan from (Israel) Maccabi Haifa)
9	FW	BIH	Luka Kulenović (on loan from (Netherlands) Heracles Almelo)
17	FW	HUN	Szabolcs Schön (from (England) Bolton Wanderers, previously on loan)
19	MF	CRC	Jewison Bennette (on loan from (Ukraine) LNZ Cherkasy)
21	MF	ROU	Efraim Bödő (from (Romania) Csíkszereda)
26	DF	HUN	Ádám Umathum (from Puskás Akadémia II, previously on loan at Csákvár)
27	DF	NGR	Leon Balogun (from (Cyprus) Aris Limassol)
29	FW	MDA	Nicolae Rotaru (from (Moldova) Petrocub Hîncești)
31	FW	GAM	Modou Lamin Marong (from (Slovakia) ŠTK Šamorín)
34	FW	MNE	Viktor Đukanović (on loan from (Sweden) Hammarby, previously on loan at (Slovakia) DAC Dunajská Streda)
77	MF	COL	Élan Ricardo (on loan from (Turkey) Beşiktaş, previously on loan at (Colombia) Deportes Tolima)
88	FW	SUI	Marc Giger (on loan from (Belgium) Union Saint-Gilloise)
—	DF	HUN	Márk Csinger (from (Slovakia) DAC Dunajská Streda, previously on loan)
—	MF	GAM	Modou Lamin Mass (from (Nigeria) Almasi Football Academy)

Out:

No.	Pos.	Nation	Player
6	MF	HUN	Rajmund Tóth (to (Turkey) Konyaspor)
7	FW	ALG	Nadhir Benbouali (to (Egypt) Pyramids)
18	DF	BEL	Senna Miangué (to (Kazakhstan) Aktobe)
19	FW	UKR	Oleksandr Pyshchur (to (Spain) Girona)
25	DF	ROU	Deian Boldor (to Kispest-Honvéd)
27	MF	HUN	Milán Vitális (to (Greece) AEK Athens)
70	MF	HUN	Imre Tollár (on loan to Gyirmót)
76	FW	AUT	Jovan Živković (on loan to (Serbia) Radnički 1923)
—	DF	HUN	Márk Csinger (to (Netherlands) Groningen)
—	MF	GAM	Modou Lamin Mass (on loan to (Slovakia) ŠTK Šamorín)
—	MF	ALB	Ledio Beqja (to (Albania) Egnatia, previously on loan at (Albania) Dinamo City)
—	FW	HUN	Balázs Farkas (to BVSC-Zugló, previously on loan)

=== Ferencváros ===
In:

No.	Pos.	Nation	Player
5	DF	FRA	Nathan Zohoré (from (France) Boulogne)
6	MF	HUN	Ádám Nagy (from (Italy) Spezia)
7	FW	SRB	Veljko Birmančević (from (Czech Republic) Sparta Prague, previously on loan at (Spain) Getafe)
22	MF	SVK	Matúš Bero (from (Germany) VfL Bochum)

Out:

No.	Pos.	Nation	Player
3	DF	SUI	Stefan Gartenmann (to (Italy) Sampdoria)
7	FW	NED	Elton Acolatse (to (Saudi Arabia) Al-Hazem)
8	FW	SRB	Aleksandar Pešić (to (Turkey) Fatih Karagümrük)
15	MF	ISR	Mohammad Abu Fani (to (Serbia) Red Star Belgrade)
22	DF	HUN	Gábor Szalai (on loan to (Portugal) Marítimo)
25	DF	LAT	Cebrail Makreckis (to (Azerbaijan) Qarabağ)
27	DF	FRA	Ibrahim Cissé (to (United Arab Emirates) Kalba)
30	FW	HUN	Zsombor Gruber (to (Belgium) RAAL La Louvière)
36	MF	ISR	Gabi Kanichowsky (to (Israel) Maccabi Tel Aviv)
40	FW	NGR	Fortune Bassey (to (Israel) Maccabi Jaffa)
44	DF	FRA	Ismaïl Aaneba (free agent)
66	MF	BRA	Júlio Romão (to (Russia) Akhmat Grozny)
99	GK	HUN	Dávid Gróf (to Diósgyőr)
—	MF	ARM	Edgar Sevikyan (on loan to (Spain) Ceuta, previously on loan at (Russia) Akron Tolyatti)
—	FW	BIH	Kenan Kodro (on loan to (Greece) OFI Crete, previously on loan at (Spain) Real Zaragoza)
—	FW	SRB	Aleksandar Ćirković (on loan to (Poland) Jagiellonia Białystok, previously on loan at (Poland) Lechia Gdańsk)

=== Paks ===
In:

No.	Pos.	Nation	Player
11	DF	HUN	Hunor Kuzma (from Békéscsaba)
15	DF	HUN	Csaba Belényesi (on loan from MTK Budapest)
20	DF	HUN	Mario Simuț (from Videoton)
25	GK	HUN	Gergő Rácz (from Kispest-Honvéd)
—	FW	HUN	Márton Zámbó (from Tiszakécske)

Out:

No.	Pos.	Nation	Player
3	DF	HUN	Áron Alaxai (loan return to Nyíregyháza Spartacus)
6	DF	HUN	Olivér Tamás (to Haladás)
15	FW	HUN	Ákos Szendrei (to Debrecen)
16	FW	HUN	Zoltán Pesti (on loan to Csákvár)
17	DF	HUN	Kristóf Hinora (to MTK Budapest)
20	DF	HUN	Márió Zeke (to Újpest)
23	MF	HUN	Csaba Máté (to Nyíregyháza Spartacus)
25	GK	HUN	Barnabás Simon (to Ajka)
26	DF	HUN	Milán Szekszárdi (on loan to Diósgyőr)
—	DF	HUN	Zsombor Éger (on loan to Tiszakécske)
—	FW	HUN	Márton Zámbó (on loan to Békéscsaba)
—	FW	HUN	Bálint Rideg (on loan to Szentlőrinc, previously on loan at Videoton)

=== Debrecen ===
In:

No.	Pos.	Nation	Player
1	GK	BUL	Plamen Andreev (from (Netherlands) Feyenoord, previously on loan at (Poland) Lech Poznań)
6	MF	BIH	Blaž Bošković (from (Croatia) Lokomotiva)
8	FW	HUN	Leon Myrtaj (from (England) Tottenham Hotspur U18)
11	FW	HUN	Ákos Szendrei (from Paks)
16	MF	ESP	Sergi Samper (from (Poland) Motor Lublin)
20	MF	HUN	Máté Macsó (from Diósgyőr)
25	FW	FRA	Sohan Baldoni (from (France) Concarneau)
39	FW	MAD	Bryan Adinany (on loan from (Belgium) Kortrijk)
66	MF	GUI	Jocelyn Janneh (from (France) Bastia)
72	DF	ISR	Rotem Keller (from (Israel) Maccabi Netanya)
89	GK	HUN	Dániel Póser (from Békéscsaba)
90	GK	HUN	Bálint Tuska (from Diósgyőr II)
97	FW	HUN	Csanád Vilmos Dénes (from (Belgium) Kortrijk)

Out:

No.	Pos.	Nation	Player
1	GK	HUN	Patrik Demjén (to MTK Budapest)
6	MF	ESP	Víctor Camarasa (to (Hong Kong) Kitchee)
8	MF	HUN	Tamás Szűcs (to (Portugal) Famalicão)
11	FW	HUN	György Komáromi (loan return to (Slovenia) Maribor)
13	MF	HUN	Soma Szuhodovszki (to MTK Budapest)
15	MF	SRB	Đorđe Gordić (loan return to (Belgium) Lommel)
16	MF	ESP	Fran Manzanara (to (Spain) Alcorcón)
17	FW	HUN	Donát Bárány (to (Netherlands) ADO Den Haag)
20	MF	CAF	Amos Youga (to Kisvárda)
86	GK	HUN	Donát Pálfi (to (Slovakia) MFK Zvolen)
87	GK	HUN	Márk Engedi (to Vasas)
90	FW	NGR	Stephen Odey (to (Malta) Floriana)
95	FW	ESP	Álex Bermejo (to (Catalonia) Sant Andreu)
—	FW	HUN	Tamás Batai (to Haladás, previously on loan at DEAC)
—	FW	CIV	Yacouba Silué (to (Serbia) OFK Beograd, previously on loan)

=== Zalaegerszeg ===
In:

No.	Pos.	Nation	Player
4	DF	CRC	Joseth Peraza (from (Costa Rica) San Carlos, previously on loan)
6	MF	BIH	Emin Kujović (from (Germany) 1. FC Köln, previously on loan at (Austria) Wolfsberger)
7	MF	UKR	Danylo Krevsun (from (Germany) Borussia Dortmund II)
9	FW	BRA	Matheus Machado (from (Saudi Arabia) Al-Fateh, previously on loan at (Bulgaria) Ludogorets)
13	DF	ARG	Tiago Peñalba (from (Argentina) San Martín de Tucumán)
20	FW	PAN	Moisés Richards (from (Panama) San Miguelito)
21	FW	NGR	Tahir Maigana (from (Nigeria) Wireless)
30	MF	ARG	Fabricio Amato (from (Argentina) Estudiantes de La Plata, previously on loan)
37	GK	BRA	Pietro Grecco (from (Brazil) Corinthians U20)
74	FW	HUN	Bence Babos (from Videoton, previously on loan at Diósgyőr)
75	FW	HUN	Máté Kiss (from Ferencváros U17)
77	FW	BRA	Arthur Henrique (on loan from (Brazil) Fluminense U20)

Out:

No.	Pos.	Nation	Player
5	DF	HUN	Bence Várkonyi (to (Azerbaijan) Qarabağ)
7	FW	HUN	Alen Skribek (to (Azerbaijan) Neftçi)
9	FW	BRA	Daniel (loan return to (Brazil) Atlético Goianiense)
11	MF	HUN	Norbert Szendrei (to Újpest)
16	MF	NED	Divaio Bobson (on loan to (Slovenia) Nafta 1903)
20	DF	POR	André Ferreira (to (Slovenia) Nafta 1903)
21	DF	HUN	Dániel Csóka (to Vasas)
42	GK	HUN	Martin Barbarics (to Zalalövő)
55	DF	NGR	Akpe Victory (to (Switzerland) Basel)
70	FW	BRA	João Victor (to (Israel) Hapoel Be'er Sheva)
73	FW	MDA	Ștefan Bîtca (loan return to (Moldova) Zimbru Chișinău)
77	MF	HUN	Csongor Papp (to BVSC-Zugló)
89	GK	HUN	Vilmos Borsos (free agent)
—	FW	HUN	Gergö Csonka (to (Austria) SpG Edelserpentin)
—	GK	HUN	Ervin Németh (to (Slovenia) Nafta 1903, previously on loan)
—	MF	HUN	Balázs Bakti (to (Croatia) Osijek, previously on loan at (Slovenia) Nafta 1903)
—	FW	HUN	Dániel Németh (to Videoton, previously on loan)

=== Puskás Akadémia ===
In:

No.	Pos.	Nation	Player
68	MF	HUN	Dániel Brügger (from (Romania) Csíkszereda)

Out:

No.	Pos.	Nation	Player
1	GK	HUN	Péter Szappanos (to Újpest)
7	FW	GHA	Joel Fameyeh (free agent)
15	MF	ISR	Moshe Semel (on loan to (Israel) Hapoel Ramat Gan)
23	DF	SUI	Quentin Maceiras (to (Switzerland) Servette)
30	MF	HUN	Zsolt Magyar (on loan to (Romania) Csíkszereda)
66	DF	HUN	Ákos Markgráf (to Újpest)
—	FW	HUN	Zoárd Nagy (on loan to Videoton, previously on loan at (Romania) Csíkszereda)
—	GK	HUN	Martin Dala (to Nyíregyháza Spartacus, previously on loan)
—	MF	HUN	Gergő Ominger (to BVSC-Zugló, previously on loan)
—	FW	HUN	Zalán Kerezsi (to MTK Budapest, previously on loan)

=== Újpest ===
In:

No.	Pos.	Nation	Player
1	GK	HUN	Péter Szappanos (from Puskás Akadémia)
3	DF	BRA	Heitor (on loam from (Israel) Maccabi Tel Aviv)
6	DF	HUN	Ákos Markgráf (from Puskás Akadémia)
8	MF	HUN	Norbert Szendrei (from Zalaegerszeg)
14	FW	TOG	Etienne Amenyido (from (Germany) Preußen Münster)
19	FW	GHA	Prince Manu Balladom (from (Ghana) Benab)
20	DF	HUN	Márió Zeke (from Paks)
21	MF	AUT	Tizian-Valentino Scharmer (from (Austria) Sturm Graz II)
26	FW	NGR	Muhamed Tijani (from (Czech Republic) Slavia Prague, previously on loan at Nyíregyháza Spartacus)
32	GK	HUN	Dávid Dombó (from Kazincbarcika, previously on loan)
36	DF	HUN	Ferenc Ujváry (from Kispest-Honvéd)
77	MF	HUN	Noah Fenyő (from (Germany) Eintracht Frankfurt II, previously on loan)

Out:

No.	Pos.	Nation	Player
1	GK	ITA	Riccardo Piscitelli (free agent)
4	DF	HUN	Csanád Fehér (to Kozármisleny)
5	DF	GEO	Davit Kobouri (to (Slovenia) Olimpija Ljubljana)
6	DF	HUN	Ákos Markgráf (to (Denmark) Copenhagen)
7	FW	GEO	Giorgi Beridze (to (Georgia (country)) Iberia 1999)
9	FW	CRO	Fran Brodić (to (Croatia) Gorica)
18	MF	FRA	Tom Lacoux (to (Croatia) Gorica)
19	FW	SLO	Nejc Gradišar (loan return to (Egypt) Al Ahly)
34	FW	SLO	Milan Tučić (to (Slovenia) Bravo)
44	DF	HUN	Bence Gergényi (free agent)
74	DF	HUN	Dominik Kaczvinszki (on loan to Nyíregyháza Spartacus)
—	GK	HUN	Bence Juhász (on loan to (Spain) Mérida, previously on loan at Kazincbarcika)
—	DF	HUN	Levente Babós (reloan to BVSC-Zugló)
—	DF	HUN	Nimród Baranyai (on loan to Tiszakécske, previously on loan at Kazincbarcika)
—	MF	HUN	Bálint Geiger (on loan to (Croatia) Karlovac 1919, previously on loan at Videoton)
—	DF	POR	Tiago Gonçalves (to (Romania) Argeș Pitești, previously on loan at (Italy) Mantova)
—	MF	HUN	Adrián Dénes (to BVSC-Zugló, previously on loan)
—	MF	HUN	Balázs Varga (to Szentlőrinc, previously on loan at Budafok)

=== Kisvárda ===
In:

No.	Pos.	Nation	Player
7	MF	AZE	Anatoliy Nuriyev (from (Azerbaijan) Zira)
22	MF	CAF	Amos Youga (from Debrecen)
24	MF	SVK	Christián Herc (from (Slovakia) Dunajská Streda)
25	DF	BIH	Besim Šerbečić (from (Bosnia and Herzegovina) Velež Mostar)

Out:

No.	Pos.	Nation	Player
3	DF	BIH	Aleksandar Jovičić (free agent)
6	MF	NGR	Ridwan Popoola (to (United Arab Emirates) Al-Wasl)
7	FW	HUN	Szilárd Szabó (loan return to Ferencváros)
16	FW	HUN	Gábor Molnár (to Diósgyőr)
21	GK	HUN	Alex Hrabina (free agent)
23	DF	SVK	Sinan Medgyes (to Gyirmót)
24	DF	BIH	Branimir Cipetić (to (Bosnia and Herzegovina) Borac Banja Luka)
44	DF	HUN	Raúl Stefan (to Nagykanizsa)
95	FW	HUN	Filip Pintér (loan return to Vasas)
—	FW	UKR	Yaroslav Gelesh (to Nagykanizsa, previously on loan at Pécs)

=== Nyíregyháza Spartacus ===
In:

No.	Pos.	Nation	Player
8	MF	HUN	Zsombor Hős (from Vasas)
17	MF	HUN	Csaba Máté (from Paks)
23	FW	LAT	Marko Regža (on loan from (Czech Republic) Hradec Králové)
25	DF	AUT	Sandro Ingolitsch (free agent)
29	FW	CMR	Jean Batoum (on loan from (Poland) Cracovia)
39	DF	CRO	Rocco Žiković (from (Austria) Liefering, previously on loan at (Portugal) Leiria)
57	GK	HUN	Martin Dala (from Puskás Akadémia, previously on loan)
74	DF	HUN	Dominik Kaczvinszki (on loan from Újpest)

Out:

No.	Pos.	Nation	Player
1	GK	HUN	Balázs Bese (free agent)
14	FW	HUN	Dominik Nagy (to Videoton)
17	FW	HUN	Benjámin Oláh (to Szentlőrinc)
18	MF	CRO	Bojan Sanković (free agent)
20	FW	MKD	Dorian Babunski (free agent)
23	FW	HUN	Márk Kovácsréti (to Vasas)
26	FW	NGR	Muhamed Tijani (loan return to (Czech Republic) Slavia Prague)
33	DF	ALB	Eneo Bitri (to (Albania) Egnatia)
34	FW	NGR	Bright Edomwonyi (free agent)
44	DF	CYP	Pavlos Korrea (to (Israel) Maccabi Petah Tikva)
45	FW	SRB	Slobodan Babić (to (Montenegro) Sutjeska Nikšić)
46	GK	HUN	Roland Kersák (free agent)
63	GK	HUN	Dániel Kovács (to (Cyprus) Nea Salamis Famagusta)
88	DF	HUN	Bendegúz Farkas (loan return to Puskás Akadémia)
98	DF	MNE	Meldin Drešković (loan return to (Germany) Darmstadt 98)
—	DF	HUN	Krisztián Keresztes (on loan to (Germany) Greuther Fürth, previously on loan at (Scotland) Dundee United)
—	FW	HUN	Péter Beke (to Kecskemét, previously on loan)

=== MTK Budapest ===
In:

No.	Pos.	Nation	Player
1	GK	HUN	Patrik Demjén (from Debrecen)
5	DF	HUN	Dániel Horváth (from Kozármisleny)
11	FW	HUN	Gábor Jurek (from Diósgyőr, previously on loan)
17	DF	HUN	Kristóf Hinora (from Paks)
20	FW	HUN	Zalán Kerezsi (from Puskás Akadémia, previously on loan)
29	MF	HUN	Soma Szuhodovszki (from Debrecen)
37	FW	HUN	Ádám Nyers (from Kispest-Honvéd)
43	GK	HUN	Bence Varga (free agent)
55	DF	CRO	Stipe Radić (from (Denmark) Viborg)
77	FW	HUN	György Komáromi (on loan from (Slovenia) Maribor, previously on loan Debrecen)
—	DF	HUN	Csaba Belényesi (from Kecskemét)
—	DF	HUN	Roland Vajda (from Puskás Akadémia II, previously on loan at Kozármisleny)
—	MF	HUN	Sámuel Major (from (Romania) ASA Târgu Mureș)

Out:

No.	Pos.	Nation	Player
3	DF	SVK	János Szépe (to Kecskemét)
7	FW	HUN	Ádin Molnár (to (Poland) Raków Częstochowa)
8	MF	HUN	Hunor Németh (loan return to (Denmark) Copenhagen)
11	FW	BIH	Marin Jurina (to (Thailand) BG Pathum United)
14	MF	HUN	Artúr Horváth (on loan to (Romania) Csíkszereda)
15	DF	HUN	Imre Széles (to Szeged-Csanád)
17	FW	SVK	Róbert Polievka (to (Slovakia) Dukla Banská Bystrica)
18	FW	HUN	Krisztián Németh (retired)
21	MF	HUN	Zalán Átrok (to (Belgium) Zulte Waregem)
23	MF	CZE	Jakub Plšek (to (Czech Republic) Dukla Prague)
25	DF	HUN	Tamás Kádár (retired)
30	DF	HUN	Viktor Vitályos (to (Czech Republic) Sparta Prague)
31	MF	HUN	Domonkos Bene (on loan to Kozármisleny)
47	GK	HUN	Krisztián Hegyi (loan return to (England) West Ham United U21)
—	DF	HUN	Csaba Belényesi (on loan to Paks)
—	DF	HUN	Roland Vajda (on loan to Kozármisleny)
—	MF	HUN	Sámuel Major (on loan to (Bulgaria) Spartak Varna)
—	MF	HUN	Patrik Szűcs (on loan to Kozármisleny, previously on loan at (Slovakia) Komárno)
—	GK	HUN	Adrián Csenterics (to (Spain) Mérida, previously on loan)
—	MF	HUN	Mátyás Kovács (to (Belgium) RAAL La Louvière, previously on loan at (Slovakia) Košice)
—	FW	HUN	Péter Törőcsik (to BVSC-Zugló, previously on loan)
—	FW	HUN	Noel Kenesei (to Kazincbarcika, previously on loan at (Belgium) OH Leuven U23)

=== Vasas ===
In:

No.	Pos.	Nation	Player
9	FW	HUN	Márk Koszta (from (Israel) Hapoel Petah Tikva)
10	FW	HUN	Márk Kovácsréti (from Nyíregyháza Spartacus)
17	DF	HUN	Dániel Csóka (from Zalaegerszeg)
18	FW	HUN	Gergő Pálinkás (from Kecskemét)
24	MF	HUN	Szabolcs Mezei (from (Serbia) TSC)
83	FW	HUN	Patrik Kovács (from Videoton)
87	GK	HUN	Márk Engedi (from Debrecen)

Out:

No.	Pos.	Nation	Player
20	DF	HUN	Máté Ódor (on loan to (Romania) Csíkszereda)
21	MF	HUN	Bertalan Kapornai (on loan to Nagykanizsa)
27	FW	HUN	Patrik Mamusits (on loan to Mezőkövesd)
56	MF	HUN	Zsombor Hős (to Nyíregyháza Spartacus)
92	FW	HUN	Barnabás Németh (to Kecskemét)
—	DF	HUN	Zsombor Puskás (on loan to Nagykanizsa)
—	MF	HUN	Dávid Artner (on loan to Ajka)
—	FW	HUN	Filip Pintér (on loan to Ajka, previously on loan at Kisvárda)
—	FW	HUN	Csaba Bukta (free agent, previously on loan at Budafok)

=== Kispest-Honvéd ===
In:

No.	Pos.	Nation	Player
3	DF	ESP	Pablo García (from (Spain) Arenas Club)
19	FW	BIH	Adi Alić (from (North Macedonia) Sileks)
20	MF	ESP	Asier García (from (Spain) Rayo Cantabria, previously on loan at (Spain) Escobedo)
31	GK	BIH	Osman Hadžikić (from (Croatia) Slaven Belupo)
33	DF	UKR	Oleksandr Safronov (from (Romania) Unirea Slobozia)
40	MF	HUN	Ádám Szamosi (from Diósgyőr, previously on loan)
45	FW	ESP	Alberto Marí (from (Spain) Valencia, previously on loan at (Spain) Mirandés)
52	DF	ROU	Deian Boldor (from ETO Győr)
80	MF	MAR	Reda Eddarraj (from (Luxembourg) Atert Bissen)

Out:

No.	Pos.	Nation	Player
9	MF	HUN	Sebestyén Ihrig-Farkas (to THSE Szabadkikötő)
20	MF	HUN	Dominik Földi (to (Spain) Marbella)
21	FW	HUN	Kevin Varga (free agent)
23	FW	HUN	Zoltán Medgyes (on loan to Diósgyőr)
36	DF	HUN	Ferenc Ujváry (to Újpest)
37	FW	HUN	Ádám Nyers (to MTK Budapest)
47	DF	HUN	Tibor Szabó (on loan to Kazincbarcika)
70	MF	HUN	Gergely Kocsis (to ESMTK)
74	FW	HUN	Benedek Simon (free agent)
75	FW	HUN	Erik Kovács (on loan to Videoton)
87	MF	HUN	Barna Kesztyűs (free agent)
95	GK	HUN	Gergő Rácz (to Paks)

== See also ==
- 2026–27 Nemzeti Bajnokság I
