= 2025–26 Nemzeti Bajnokság I =

Fizz Liga
- Győr being crowned champions on 17 May 2026
- Season: 2025–26
- Dates: 25 July 2025 – 16 May 2026
- Champions: Győri ETO (5th title)
- Relegated: Diósgyőr; Kazincbarcika
- Champions League: Győri ETO
- Europa League: Ferencváros
- Conference League: Paks; Debrecen
- Matches: 198
- Goals: 594 (3 per match)
- Top goalscorer: Lukács and Matko (17 each)
- Biggest home win: 5 goals, MTK 5–0 Diósgyőr; Round 3 (9 August 2025), Zalaegerszeg 5–0 Kazincbarcika; Round 8 (27 September 2025), Újpest 7–2 Nyíregyháza; Round 30 (17 April 2026)
- Biggest away win: 5 goals, MTK 2–7 Győr; Round 4 (17 August 2025), Diósgyőr 0–5 Debrecen; Round 30 (18 April 2026), Újpest 0–5 Ferencváros; Round 32 (3 May 2026)
- Highest scoring: 9 goals MTK 2–7 Győr; Round 4 (17 August 2025), Újpest 7–2 Nyíregyháza; Round 30 (17 April 2026)
- Longest winning run: 6 (Győri ETO)
- Longest unbeaten run: 11 (Győri ETO)
- Longest winless run: 9 (Kazincbarcika and MTK)
- Longest losing run: 5 (Diósgyőr, Kazincbarcika and Paks)
- Highest attendance: 18,779; Ferencváros 3–0 Újpest; Round 21 (7 February 2026)
- Lowest attendance: 292; Kazincbarcika 1–3 Győri ETO; Round 5 (3 December 2025)
- Total attendance: 847,396
- Average attendance: 4,280 ▼5.5%

The 2025–26 Nemzeti Bajnokság I (also known as 2025–26 Fizz Liga), also known as NB I, was the 127th season of top-tier football in Hungary. The league was officially named OTP Bank's webshop subsidiary for sponsorship reasons. Ferencváros were the 7-time defending champions.

== Teams ==
=== Changes ===
Twelve teams competed in the league – the top ten teams from the previous season and the two teams promoted from the Nemzeti Bajnokság II. The promoted teams are Kisvárda which returned to the top tier after a year absence and Kazincbarcika who played in top tier for the first time in history for this season. They replaced Fehérvár and Kecskemét, who were relegated to the Nemzeti Bajnokság II after respective spells of twenty-five and three years in the top flight.

=== Stadium and locations ===
Note: Table lists in alphabetical order.

Location of teams in 2025–26 Nemzeti Bajnokság I
Location of teams in Budapest

Team	Location	Stadium	Capacity	2024–25	2025–26
Debrecen	Debrecen	Nagyerdei Stadion	20,340	9th	details
Diósgyőr	Miskolc (Diósgyőr)	Diósgyőri Stadion	15,325	6th	details
Ferencváros	Budapest (Ferencváros)	Groupama Aréna	22,043	1st	details
Győr	Győr	ETO Park	15,600	4th	details
Kazincbarcika	Kazincbarcika	Városi Stadion (Mezőkövesd)/ Diósgyőri Stadion*	4,183 / 15,325	2nd (NB II)	details
Kisvárda	Kisvárda	Várkerti Stadion	2,850	1st (NB II)	details
MTK	Budapest (Józsefváros)	Hidegkuti Nándor Stadion	5,014	5th	details
Nyíregyháza	Nyíregyháza	Városi Stadion	8,150	8th	details
Paks	Paks	Fehérvári úti Stadion	6,150	3rd	details
Puskás Akadémia	Felcsút	Pancho Aréna	3,816	2nd	details
Újpest	Budapest (Újpest)	Szusza Ferenc Stadion	12,670	7th	details
Zalaegerszeg	Zalaegerszeg	ZTE Aréna	11,200	10th	details

*Kazincbarcika played its home games from Round 1 until Round 18 in Mezőkövesd and from Round 19 until Round 33 in Diósgyőri Stadion (Miskolc), as their stadium did not comply with NB I rules.

Debrecen	Diósgyőr/Kazincbarcika*	Ferencváros	Győr
Nagyerdei Stadion	Diósgyőri Stadion	Groupama Aréna	ETO Park
Capacity: 20,340	Capacity: 15,325	Capacity: 22,043	Capacity: 15,600
Kazincbarcika	Kisvárda	MTK	Nyíregyháza
Városi Stadion (Mezőkövesd)	Várkerti Stadion	Hidegkuti Nándor Stadion	Városi Stadion
Capacity: 4,183	Capacity: 2,850	Capacity: 5,014	Capacity: 8,150
Paks	Puskás Akadémia	Újpest	Zalaegerszeg
Fehérvári úti Stadion	Pancho Aréna	Szusza Ferenc Stadion	ZTE Arena
Capacity: 6,150	Capacity: 3,816	Capacity: 12,670	Capacity: 11,200

==== Number of teams by counties and regions ====
Number of teams by counties
Pos.	County (megye)	No. of teams	Teams
1	Budapest	3	Ferencváros, MTK and Újpest
2	Borsod-Abaúj-Zemplén	2	Diósgyőr and Kazincbarcika
2	Szabolcs-Szatmár-Bereg	2	Kisvárda and Nyíregyháza
4	Fejér	1	Puskás Akadémia
4	Győr-Moson-Sopron	1	Győr
4	Hajdú-Bihar	1	Debrecen
4	Tolna	1	Paks
4	Zala	1	Zalaegerszeg

Number of teams by regions
Transdanubia	Central Hungary	Great Plain and North
Győr; Paks; Puskás Akadémia; Zalaegerszeg	Ferencváros; MTK; Újpest	Debrecen; Diósgyőr; Kazincbarcika; Kisvárda; Nyíregyháza
4 Teams	3 Teams	5 Teams

=== Personnel and kits ===
All teams were obligated to have the logo of the league sponsor Fizz (the OTP Bank's webshop subsidiar) as well as the Nemzeti Bajnokság I logo on the right side of their shirt. Hungarian national sports betting brand Tippmix sponsored all 12 teams of the first league since February 2019, their logo were present on all team kits.

Note: Flags indicate national team as has been defined under FIFA eligibility rules. Players and Managers may hold more than one non-FIFA nationality.

Team	Head coach	Captain	Kit maker	Kit sponsors	
Team	Head coach	Captain	Kit maker	Main	Other(s)
Debrecen	(Spain) Sergio Navarro	(Hungary) Balázs Dzsudzsák	Adidas	Tranzit-Food	None
Diósgyőr	(Hungary) Péter Takács (interim)	(Hungary) Gergő Holdampf	2Rule	Hell	List: Back: Apollo Tyres; Sleeves and Shorts: Mercedes-Benz Miskolc; Shorts: Duna Aszfalt
Ferencváros	(Republic of Ireland) Robbie Keane	(Hungary) Dénes Dibusz	Macron	Telekom	List: Front: Midea; Back: iForex Europe, Superz.; Sleeves: Groupama and MVM; Shorts: MVM and VW
Győr	(Slovakia) Balázs Borbély	(Romania) Paul Anton	Macron	Kukkonia	None
Kazincbarcika	(Hungary) Attila Kuttor	(Hungary) Bálint Kártik	Puma	NanoMix Beton, GNB	List: Shorts: Green Plan
Kisvárda	(Hungary) Attila Révész	(Bosnia and Herzegovina) Jasmin Mešanović	Adidas	Master Good	None
MTK	(Hungary) Máté Pinezits	(Hungary) Mihály Kata	Nike	Prohuman	List: Back: Hilaris Hotels; Sleeves: HR-Rent; Back: 11teamsports
Nyíregyháza	(Hungary) István Szabó	(Hungary) Dominik Nagy	Macron	Révész Group	List: Sleeves: City of Nyíregyháza
Paks	(Hungary) György Bognár	(Hungary) Dániel Böde	Nike	None	List: Shorts: tarr
Puskás Akadémia	(Slovakia) Zsolt Hornyák	(Hungary) Roland Szolnoki	2Rule	MBH Bank	None
Újpest	(Hungary) Zoltán Szélesi	(Serbia) Matija Ljujić	Puma	MOL	List: Sleeves: Toyota Schiller
Zalaegerszeg	(Portugal) Nuno Campos	(Hungary) Norbert Szendrei	2Rule	ZÁÉV	List: Sleeves: City of Zalaegerszeg

==== Managerial changes ====
Team	Outgoing manager	Manner of departure	Date of vacancy	Position in table	Incoming manager	Date of appointment	Ref.
Kisvárda	(Hungary) Attila Révész	Appointed sports director	31 May 2025	Pre-season	(Hungary) Máté Gerliczki	31 May 2025	
Kazincbarcika	(Hungary) Gábor Erős	Signed by Vasas	31 May 2025	Pre-season	(Hungary) Attila Kuttor	5 June 2025	
Diósgyőr	(Lithuania) Valdas Dambrauskas	Resign	12 June 2025	Pre-season	(Serbia) Vladimir Radenković	18 June 2025	
Debrecen	(Serbia) Nestor El Maestro	Mutual agreement	14 June 2025	Pre-season	(Spain) Sergio Navarro	17 June 2025	
Zalaegerszeg	(Hungary) István Mihalecz	Mutual agreement	16 June 2025	Pre-season	(Portugal) Nuno Campos	24 June 2025	
Kisvárda	(Hungary) Máté Gerliczki	Mutual agreement	30 September 2025	7th	(Hungary) Attila Révész	10 October 2025	
Nyíregyháza	(Hungary) István Szabó	Sacked	28 October 2025	12th	(Hungary) Tamás Bódog	29 October 2025	
Újpest	(Croatia) Damir Krznar	Sacked	9 November 2025	9th	(Hungary) Boldizsár Bodor (interim)	9 November 2025	
MTK	Dávid Horváth	Change of role	20 December 2025	9th	(Hungary) Máté Pinezits	21 December 2025	
Újpest	Boldizsár Bodor (interim)	Contracts expire	30 December 2025	8th	Zoltán Szélesi	30 December 2025	
Diósgyőr	(Serbia) Vladimir Radenković	Mutual agreement	6 March 2026	11th	(Serbia) Nebojša Vignjević	6 March 2026	
Diósgyőr	(Serbia) Nebojša Vignjević	Sacked	18 April 2026	11th	Péter Takács (interim)	24 April 2026	

== League table ==
Pos	Team	Pld	W	D	L	GF	GA	GD	Pts	Qualification or relegation
1	Győr (C)	33	20	9	4	65	30	+35	69	Qualification for the Champions League first qualifying round
2	Ferencváros	33	21	5	7	67	31	+36	68	Qualification for the Europa League first qualifying round (Note: The 2025–26 Magyar Kupa winners (Ferencváros) qualify for the Europa League first qualifying round.)
3	Paks	33	15	8	10	63	46	+17	53	Qualification for the Conference League second qualifying round
4	Debrecen	33	14	11	8	51	41	+10	53	Qualification for the Conference League second qualifying round
5	Zalaegerszeg	33	13	9	11	49	43	+6	48	
6	Puskás Akadémia	33	13	7	13	43	43	0	46	
7	Újpest	33	11	7	15	48	57	−9	40	
8	Kisvárda	33	11	7	15	36	49	−13	40	
9	Nyíregyháza	33	10	10	13	47	57	−10	40	
10	MTK	33	9	11	13	55	62	−7	38	
11	Diósgyőr (R)	33	6	10	17	39	65	−26	28	Relegation to the Nemzeti Bajnokság II
12	Kazincbarcika (R)	33	6	4	23	31	70	−39	22	Relegation to the Nemzeti Bajnokság II

Source: Hungarian Football Federation (in Hungarian)
Rules for classification: 1) Points; 2) Matches won; 3) Goal difference; 4) Goals scored; 5) Head-to-head points; 6) Head-to-head goal difference; 7) Fair play ranking; 8) Drawing of lots.
(C) Champions; (R) Relegated

== Results ==
Home \ Away	DEB	DIO	FER	GYO	KAZ	KIS	MTK	NYI	PAK	PUS	UJP	ZAL	DEB	DIO	FER	GYO	KAZ	KIS	MTK	NYI	PAK	PUS	UJP	ZAL
Debrecen		3–2	0–3	1–1	2–1	0–1	1–0	1–2	1–0	0–1	5–2	2–1			0–2	1–1			2–2	1–1			2–1	
Diósgyőr	0–0		0–1	1–1	2–2	1–1	4–0	2–0	2–1	1–1	1–3	2–2	0–5				0–4				1–3	1–2		1–1
Ferencváros	0–1	2–2		1–3	3–0	3–0	4–1	1–3	2–2	1–2	3–0	1–2		3–1			2–1				2–0	2–1		3–0
Győr	2–2	3–1	0–2		3–1	1–0	3–0	1–0	0–0	2–0	1–1	0–1		4–0	1–0				0–0	1–0			2–1	
Kazincbarcika	1–2	1–1	1–3	1–3		0–1	3–1	0–4	0–2	1–3	2–0	0–1	0–3			1–3		2–1	0–0			0–2	0–3	
Kisvárda	0–1	1–0	0–1	3–2	1–0		2–3	0–0	1–5	2–1	3–0	3–3	0–0	1–2	1–1	0–1					2–1	1–0		
MTK	3–0	5–0	1–1	2–7	1–3	4–0		5–1	2–3	2–2	3–4	1–0		1–1	1–3			2–1		1–1	0–2			3–0
Nyíregyháza	0–3	1–4	1–4	0–1	0–1	1–1	4–2		1–1	1–1	1–1	3–1		3–1	1–3		2–2	2–2			2–0			2–1
Paks	1–1	1–2	0–1	3–3	3–0	5–3	3–1	2–1		3–2	1–3	2–2	5–2			3–4	5–1					1–0		1–1
Puskás Akadémia	1–3	2–1	1–2	0–2	2–1	2–0	1–1	3–2	1–2		0–0	0–1	1–1			1–4			2–2	1–2			2–0	
Újpest	2–1	3–1	1–1	0–3	2–1	0–1	1–2	2–2	1–2	0–1		0–2		2–1	0–5			2–1	2–2	7–2	0–0			
Zalaegerszeg	3–3	2–0	3–1	1–1	5–0	1–2	1–1	0–1	1–0	0–1	1–4		1–1			2–1	4–0	2–0				1–3	2–0	

Updated to match(es) played on 16 May 2026, Round 33. Source: Hungarian Football Federation (in Hungarian)
Legend: Blue = home team win; Yellow = draw; Red = away team win.
For upcoming matches, an "a" indicates there is an article about the rivalry between the two participants.

== Positions by round ==
The table lists the positions of teams after each week of matches. To preserve chronological evolvements, any postponed matches are not included in the round at which they were originally scheduled, but added to the full round they were played immediately afterwards.

Team ╲ Round	1	2	3	4	5	6	7	8	9	10	11	12	13	14	15	16	17	18	19	20	21	22	23	24	25	26	27	28	29	30	31	32	33
Győr	4	7	9	6	5	3	1	3	3	3	4	5	3	4	3	2	1	1	1	1	2	1	1	1	2	2	2	2	2	1	1	1	1
Ferencváros	7	3	1	3	2	2	3	2	2	2	3	1	1	1	1	1	2	2	3	2	1	2	2	2	1	1	1	1	1	2	2	2	2
Paks	5	2	2	2	1	1	2	1	1	1	1	3	2	3	4	4	4	3	2	3	4	4	4	4	6	6	5	5	5	5	5	3	3
Debrecen	3	5	3	4	3	4	4	4	4	6	5	2	4	2	2	3	3	4	4	4	3	3	3	3	3	3	3	4	3	3	3	4	4
Zalaegerszeg	6	6	8	10	11	11	12	10	12	12	10	11	8	8	8	7	7	7	7	7	7	5	6	7	5	4	4	3	4	4	4	5	5
Puskás Akadémia	2	1	4	1	4	5	6	6	7	7	7	6	7	5	6	5	5	5	5	5	5	6	5	5	7	7	7	6	7	8	6	6	6
Újpest	1	4	6	7	6	7	8	8	8	8	11	8	9	9	9	10	9	8	9	9	9	8	8	8	8	8	8	8	8	6	7	7	7
Kisvárda	8	11	7	5	7	6	7	7	6	5	2	4	6	7	5	6	6	6	6	6	6	7	7	6	4	5	6	7	6	7	8	8	8
Nyíregyháza	10	8	10	9	10	10	10	11	9	9	12	12	11	11	11	11	11	11	11	11	10	10	10	9	9	9	9	9	9	10	9	9	9
MTK	9	9	5	8	9	8	5	5	5	4	6	7	5	6	7	8	8	9	8	8	8	9	9	10	10	10	10	10	10	9	10	10	10
Diósgyőr	12	10	11	11	8	9	9	9	10	10	8	9	10	10	10	9	10	10	10	10	11	11	11	11	11	11	11	11	11	11	11	11	11
Kazincbarcika	11	12	12	12	12	12	11	12	11	11	9	10	12	12	12	12	12	12	12	12	12	12	12	12	12	12	12	12	12	12	12	12	12

Leader and qualification for the Champions League first qualifying round
Qualification for the Conference League second qualifying round
Relegation to the Nemzeti Bajnokság II

Updated to match(es) played on 16 May 2026, Round 33. Source: Hungarian Football Federation (in Hungarian)

== Season statistics ==
As of match played 16 May 2026

=== Top goalscorers ===
Rank	Player	Club	Goals
1	(Hungary) Dániel Lukács	Puskás Akadémia	17
1	(Slovenia) Aljoša Matko	Újpest	17
3	(Algeria) Nadhir Benbouali	Győri ETO	14
4	(Hungary) Donát Bárány	Debrecen	12
5	(Netherlands) Elton Acolatse	Diósgyőr (8) / Ferencváros (2)	10
5	(Hungary) Dániel Böde	Paks	10
5	(Hungary) Ádin Molnár	MTK	10
5	(Hungary) Alen Skribek	Zalaegerszeg	10
5	(Hungary) Barnabás Varga^{1}	Ferencváros	10
10	(Hungary) Zsombor Gruber	Ferencváros	9
10	(Hungary) János Hahn	Paks	9
10	(Hungary) Milán Vitális	Győri ETO	9

^{1} Barnabás Varga was transferred to AEK Athens during the winter transfer window.

=== Hat-tricks ===
(H) = Home; (A) = Away;

Player	For	Against	Score	Result	Round	Date
Rajmund Molnár	MTK	Diósgyőr (H)	7' (pen.) 1–0, 32' 3–0, 43' (pen.) 4–0	5–0	3	9 August 2025
Krisztofer Horváth	Újpest	Nyíregyháza (H)	3' 1–0, 16' 3–0, 71' 6–0	7–2	30	17 April 2026

=== Attendances ===
Ranked by average attendances.

Pos	Team	Total	High	Low	Average	Change
1	Ferencváros	161,670	18,779	6,477	10,104	−10.1%
2	Debrecen	115,440	12,646	3,514	7,215	+27.0%
3	Újpest	103,516	10,011	3,057	6,089	+8.6%
4	Nyíregyháza	93,460	8,013	3,577	5,498	−4.8%
5	Győr	82,345	8,280	1,906	5,147	+30.8%
6	Diósgyőr	58,503	6,279	104	3,656	−35.7%
7	Zalaegerszeg	57,359	6,148	1,700	3,374	+14.1%
8	MTK	52,194	4,872	1,954	3,070	+3.2%
9	Paks	43,916	4,691	2,011	2,745	−6.4%
10	Kisvárda	36,955	3,150	1,250	2,174	+73.9%^{1}
11	Puskás Akadémia	27,272	3,242	500	1,705	+3.9%
12	Kazincbarcika	14,766	2,981	292	869	+29.5%^{1}
	League total	847,396	18,779	104	4,280	−5.5%

Source: magyarfutball (in Hungarian)
Notes:
1: Team played last season in Nemzeti Bajnokság II

== Awards ==
=== Monthly awards ===
Month	Player of the Month		Coach of the Month		Goal of the Month		Save of the Month		Ref
Month	Player	Club	Coach	Club	Player	Club	Goalkeeper	Club	Ref
July–August	(Hungary) Zsombor Gruber	Ferencváros	(Hungary) György Bognár	Paks	(Hungary) Milán Vitális	Győri ETO	(Croatia) Karlo Sentić	Diósgyőr	
September	(Hungary) Ádin Molnár	MTK	(Hungary) Dávid Horváth	MTK	(Netherlands) Elton Acolatse	Diósgyőr	(Hungary) Dániel Kovács	Nyíregyháza	
October	(Hungary) István Bognár	MTK	(Hungary) Attila Révész	Kisvárda	(Hungary) Balázs Dzsudzsák	Debrecen	(Croatia) Karlo Sentić	Diósgyőr	
November	(Netherlands) Elton Acolatse	Diósgyőr	(Portugal) Nuno Campos	Zalaegerszeg	(Hungary) János Galambos	Paks	(Croatia) Karlo Sentić	Diósgyőr	
December	(Serbia) Željko Gavrić	Győri ETO	(Hungary) Balázs Borbély	Győri ETO	(Bulgaria) Tonislav Yordanov	Kisvárda	(Croatia) Karlo Sentić	Diósgyőr	
January–February	(Hungary) Milán Vitális	Győri ETO	(Hungary) Tamás Bódog	Nyíregyháza	(Hungary) Donát Bárány	Debrecen	(Hungary) Péter Szappanos	Puskás Akadémia	
March	(Hungary) Norbert Szendrei	Zalaegerszeg	(Portugal) Nuno Campos	Zalaegerszeg	(Hungary) Vince Nyíri	Kazincbarcika	(Hungary) Bence Juhász	Kazincbarcika	
April	(Hungary) Milán Vitális	Győri ETO	(Hungary) Balázs Borbély	Győri ETO	(Serbia) Matija Ljujić	Újpest	(Hungary) Dávid Banai	Újpest	

== Attendances ==
Nemzeti Bajnokság I clubs listed by average home league attendance:

Pos	Club	Average attendance
1	Ferencváros	10,104
2	DVSC	7,216
3	Újpest	6,089
4	Nyíregyháza Spartacus	5,492
5	Győri ETO	5,144
6	DVTK	3,658
7	ZTE	3,377
8	MTK	3,070
9	Paksi FC	2,716
10	Kisvárda FC	2,174
11	Puskás AFC	1,752
12	Kazincbarcikai SC	861

== See also ==
- 2025–26 in Hungarian football
- List of Hungarian football transfers summer 2025
- List of Hungarian football transfers winter 2025–26
- 2025–26 Magyar Kupa
- 2025–26 Nemzeti Bajnokság II
- 2025–26 Nemzeti Bajnokság III
- 2025–26 Megyei Bajnokság I
