= Törőcsik =

Törőcsik is a Hungarian surname. Notable people with the surname include:

- András Törőcsik (1955–2022), Hungarian footballer
- Mari Törőcsik (1935–2021), Hungarian actress
- Péter Törőcsik (born 2001), Hungarian footballer
