= Hunor Németh =

Hungarian footballer (born 2007)

- Németh in 2026

Personal information
- Full name: Hunor Vajk Németh
- Date of birth: 16 March 2007 (age 19)
- Place of birth: Győr, Hungary
- Height: 1.82 m (6 ft 0 in)
- Position: Midfielder

Team information
- Current team: Copenhagen
- Number: 28

Youth career
- 2015-2025: Copenhagen

Senior career*
Years	Team	Apps	(Gls)
2025–	Copenhagen	1	(0)
2025–2026	→ MTK Budapest (loan)	29	(4)

International career^{‡}
2021	Hungary U-15	9	(0)
2022	Hungary U-16	5	(2)
2022–2023	Hungary U-17	8	(0)
2024–2025	Hungary U-19	10	(4)
2025–	Hungary U-21	2	(0)
- * Club domestic league appearances and goals as of 11 September 2026 ‡ National team caps and goals as of 21 November 2025 (UTC)

Hunor Németh (born 16 March 2007) is a Hungarian international footballer who plays as a midfielder for Copenhagen in the Danish Superliga.

== Early life ==
Németh was born in Győr, Hungary but when he was three moved with his family to Copenhagen, Denmark, where he started to play football at the local club Birkerød before moving to Copenhagen academy.

== Club career ==
As a youth player, he joined the youth academy of Danish side Copenhagen, where he played in the UEFA Youth League and was promoted to the club's senior team in 2025.

== Career statistics ==
As of match played 15 September 2026

Appearances by club, season and competition
Club	Season	League			National cup		Europe		Other		Total	
Club	Season	Division	Apps	Goals	Apps	Goals	Apps	Goals	Apps	Goals	Apps	Goals
Copenhagen	2025–26	Danish Superliga	0	0	0	0	0	0	—		0	0
Copenhagen	2026–27	Danish Superliga	1	0	1	0	0	0	—		2	0
Copenhagen	Total		1	0	1	0	0	0	—		2	0
MTK Budapest (loan)	2025–26	Nemzeti Bajnokság I	29	4	2	0	—		—		31	4
Career total			30	4	3	0	0	0	0	0	33	4
