= Srđan Dimitrov =

Serbian footballer

Personal information
- Date of birth: 28 July 1992 (age 34)
- Place of birth: Novi Sad, FR Yugoslavia
- Height: 1.76 m (5 ft 9 in)
- Position: Attacking midfielder

Team information
- Current team: Inđija
- Number: 10

Senior career*
Years	Team	Apps	(Gls)
2009–2013	Inđija	76	(19)
2013–2016	Napredak Kruševac	51	(7)
2016	Inđija	11	(0)
2016–2017	Birkirkara	30	(11)
2017	RFS	6	(0)
2018	Birkirkara	8	(4)
2018	Ubon UMT United	14	(1)
2019–2020	Inđija	39	(9)
2020–2021	MTK Budapest	36	(1)
2022	Mladost Novi Sad	30	(6)
2023–2024	Okzhetpes	34	(6)
2024–	Inđija	13	(0)
- * Club domestic league appearances and goals as of 25 June 2025

Srđan Dimitrov (Serbian Cyrillic: Срђан Димитров; born 28 July 1992) is a Serbian footballer who plays for Inđija.

== Club career ==
=== Inđija ===
Born in Novi Sad, Dimitrov was recognized as a standout of Inđija's youth academy from early age. He made his professional debut at the age of 17 with Inđija on 3 October 2009 in a match against Radnički Niš. At the end of the 2011–12 season he was the third-highest goalscorer in the entire Serbian First League even though he was a teenager.

=== Napredak ===
In August 2013, Dimitrov was one of Napredak Kruševac's ambitious summer signings of 2013 which included the likes of Nikola Trujić and Miloš Deletić. Dimitrov immediately became a regular starter for Napredak. He scored his first goal for Napredak on 23 November 2013 in a 3–0 win against OFK Beograd.

=== Birkirkara ===
On 17 June 2016, Dimitrov signed a one-year contract at Maltese Premier League, club Birkirkara.

=== MTK ===
At the end of September 2020, Dimitrov moved to Hungarian club MTK Budapest FC.
