= Clinton Osei =

Ghanaian footballer

Personal information
- Date of birth: 17 March 2002 (age 24)
- Place of birth: Ghana
- Height: 1.60 m (5 ft 3 in)
- Position: Centre forward

Team information
- Current team: Voska Sport

Youth career
- ?–2020: Koowa Naso FC
- 2020–2021: MTK Budapest U19

Senior career*
Years	Team	Apps	(Gls)
2020–2021	MTK Budapest	5	(0)
2021–2023	MTK Budapest II	22	(7)
2022	→ Kozármisleny (loan)	3	(0)
2023–2024	ACS Târgu Mureș 1898		
2024–2025	Voska Sport	27	(7)
2025	Rabotnicki	0	(0)
2025	Makedonija GP	7	(1)
- * Club domestic league appearances and goals as of 15 January 2026

Clinton Osei (born 17 March 2002) is a Ghanaian professional footballer.

== Career statistics ==
As of 15 May 2021.

Appearances and goals by club, season and competition
Club	Season	League			Cup		Continental		Other		Total	
Club	Season	Division	Apps	Goals	Apps	Goals	Apps	Goals	Apps	Goals	Apps	Goals
MTK Budapest	2020–21	Nemzeti Bajnokság I	3	0	2	0	—		0	0	5	0
MTK Budapest	Total		3	0	2	0	0	0	0	0	5	0
Career total			3	0	2	0	0	0	0	0	5	0
