= Mihály Kata =

Hungarian association football player

Personal information
- Full name: Mihály Kata
- Date of birth: 13 April 2002 (age 24)
- Place of birth: Budapest, Hungary
- Height: 1.76 m (5 ft 9 in)
- Position: Midfielder

Team information
- Current team: MTK Budapest
- Number: 6

Youth career
- 2009–2013: Dalnoki Akadémia
- 2013–2019: MTK Budapest

Senior career*
Years	Team	Apps	(Gls)
2019–	MTK Budapest	187	(6)

International career^{‡}
2017–2018	Hungary U16	13	(0)
2018–2020	Hungary U17	11	(0)
2021–	Hungary U21	3	(0)
2023–	Hungary	5	(0)
- * Club domestic league appearances and goals as of 30 May 2026 ‡ National team caps and goals as of 20 March 2025

Mihály Kata (born 13 April 2002) is a Hungarian footballer who plays as a midfielder for MTK and the Hungary national team.

== Club career ==
On 7 August 2019, he played his first match in the first team of MTK Budapest FC in a 3–0 victory over Budaörsi SC in the 2019–20 Nemzeti Bajnokság II season. On 13 December 2020, he scored his first goal in the first team in a 1–0 victory over Diósgyőri VTK at the Hidegkuti Nándor Stadion in the 2020–21 Nemzeti Bajnokság I season. On 5 February 2023, he scored his first goal in a 0–2 victory over Dorogi FC in the 2022–23 Nemzeti Bajnokság II season. On 30 April 2023, he scored a goal in a 1–1 draw with FC Ajka in the 2022-23 NB II season. Thanks to his performance in the 2023–24 Nemzeti Bajnokság I season, he drew the attention of Southampton and SC Heerenveen.

== International career ==
He debuted in the Hungary national football team in a 2–1 victory over Serbia in the UEFA Euro 2024 qualifying match on 7 September 2023 at the Red Star Stadium. On 10 September 2023, he played his second match in a 1–1 draw friendly tie with Czechia at the Puskás Aréna.

On 14 May 2024, Kata was named in Hungary's squad for UEFA Euro 2024.

== Career statistics ==
=== Club ===
As of match played 30 August 2025

Club	Season	League			National Cup		League Cup		Other		Total	
Club	Season	Division	Apps	Goals	Apps	Goals	Apps	Goals	Apps	Goals	Apps	Goals
MTK Budapest	2018–19	Nemzeti Bajnokság I	0	0	1 (Note: Appearances in the Magyar Kupa)	0	–		–		1	0
MTK Budapest	2019–20	Nemzeti Bajnokság II	19	0	4	0	–		–		23	0
MTK Budapest	2020–21	Nemzeti Bajnokság I	24	1	4	0	–		–		28	1
MTK Budapest	2021–22	Nemzeti Bajnokság I	20	0	1	0	–		–		21	0
MTK Budapest	2022–23	Nemzeti Bajnokság II	35	2	3	0	–		–		38	2
MTK Budapest	2023–24	Nemzeti Bajnokság I	30	2	2	0	–		–		32	2
MTK Budapest	2024–25	Nemzeti Bajnokság I	32	0	1	0	–		–		33	0
MTK Budapest	2025–26	Nemzeti Bajnokság I	6	1	0	0	–		–		6	1
Career total			166	6	16	0	0	0	0	0	182	6

=== International ===
As of match played 20 March 2025

Appearances and goals by national team and year
National team	Year	Apps	Goals
Hungary	2023	3	0
Hungary	2024	1	0
Hungary	2025	1	0
Total		5	0
