= Roland Lehoczky =

Hungarian footballer (born 2002)

Personal information
- Full name: Roland Patrik Lehoczky
- Date of birth: 19 April 2002 (age 24)
- Place of birth: Budapest, Hungary
- Height: 1.84 m (6 ft 0 in)
- Position: Defender

Team information
- Current team: BVSC
- Number: 55

Youth career
- 2009–2018: Főnix
- 2018–2020: MTK

Senior career*
| Years | Team | Apps | (Gls) |
| 2020–2026 | MTK | 20 | (1) |
| 2020–2021 | → Szentlőrinc (loan) | 14 | (1) |
| 2020–2021 | → Szentlőrinc II (loan) | 3 | (1) |
| 2021–2022 | → Ajka (loan) | 33 | (5) |
| 2022–2024 | → Mezőkövesd (loan) | 12 | (1) |
| 2024 | → Tiszakécske (loan) | 13 | (0) |
| 2024 | → Tiszakécske II (loan) | 1 | (0) |
| 2024–2025 | → Vasas (loan) | 14 | (0) |
| 2024–2025 | → Vasas II (loan) | 1 | (0) |
| 2026– | BVSC | 13 | (1) |

International career^{‡}
| 2022 | Hungary U21 | 1 | (0) |
- * Club domestic league appearances and goals as of 31 May 2026 ‡ National team caps and goals as of 27 September 2022

Roland Lehoczky (born 19 April 2002) is a Hungarian professional footballer, who plays as a defender for Nemzeti Bajnokság II club BVSC. He represented Hungary at youth level.

== Career ==
Lehoczky joined MTK from Főnix in 2018. After playing for the club's U19 team he made the first team on 7 January 2020.

On 30 July 2020, it was announced announced he would move to the newly promoted Nemzeti Bajnokság II club Szentlőrinc on loan until the end of the 2020–21 season. However, MTK called Lehoczky back during the winter preparations. He played as a central defender in 14 league matches. Lehoczky joined to second division Ajka on 25 June 2021, where he spent the following season on loan.

On 27 December 2022, he as a U21 national was loaned out to Nemzeti Bajnokság I club Mezőkövesd for the second half of the season. Lehoczky debuted in the first division on the 20th round of the 2022–23 season against Paks at the end of the match stoppage time.

He remained on loan at Mezőkövesd for the first half of the 2023–24 season before joining Tiszakécske on loan in the Nemzeti Bajnokság II on 10 January 2024 until the end of the season. On 12 August 2023, he scored a late equalizer in a 1–1 draw away from home to Újpest, his first goal in the top flight.

On 16 June 2024, Lehoczky signed for Nemzeti Bajnokság II club Vasas on loan, with an option to buy until the end of the 2024–25 season alongside his Tiszakécske teammate, Ágoston Kiss. After the season ended, Vasas decided not to redeem the option to buy on his contract, he started the preparations for the new season at MTK.

== Career statistics ==
As of match played 25 May 2025

Appearances and goals by club, season and competition
| Club | Season | League | | | National cup (Note: Includes Magyar Kupa) | | Total | |
| Club | Season | Division | Apps | Goals | Apps | Goals | Apps | Goals |
|---|---|---|---|---|---|---|---|---|
| Szentlőrinc (loan) | 2020–21 | Nemzeti Bajnokság II | 14 | 1 | 2 | 0 | 16 | 1 |
| Szentlőrinc II (loan) | 2020–21 | Megyei Bajnokság I | 3 | 1 | — | | 3 | 1 |
| Ajka (loan) | 2021–22 | Nemzeti Bajnokság II | 33 | 5 | 1 | 0 | 34 | 5 |
| Mezőkövesd (loan) | 2022–23 | Nemzeti Bajnokság I | 8 | 0 | 0 | 0 | 8 | 0 |
| Mezőkövesd (loan) | 2023–24 | Nemzeti Bajnokság I | 4 | 1 | — | | 4 | 1 |
| Mezőkövesd (loan) | Total | | 12 | 1 | 0 | 0 | 12 | 1 |
| Tiszakécske (loan) | 2023–24 | Nemzeti Bajnokság II | 13 | 0 | 1 | 0 | 14 | 0 |
| Tiszakécske II (loan) | 2023–24 | Megyei Bajnokság I | 1 | 0 | — | | 1 | 0 |
| Vasas (loan) | 2024–25 | Nemzeti Bajnokság II | 14 | 0 | 1 | 0 | 15 | 0 |
| Vasas II (loan) | 2024–25 | Nemzeti Bajnokság III | 1 | 0 | — | | 1 | 0 |
| MTK | 2020–21 | Nemzeti Bajnokság I | 0 | 0 | 1 | 0 | 1 | 0 |
| MTK | 2022–23 | Nemzeti Bajnokság II | 17 | 1 | 2 | 0 | 19 | 1 |
| MTK | 2025–26 | Nemzeti Bajnokság I | 0 | 0 | 0 | 0 | 0 | 0 |
| MTK | Total | | 17 | 1 | 3 | 0 | 20 | 1 |
| Career total | | | 108 | 9 | 8 | 0 | 116 | 9 |

== Honours ==
Tiszakécske II

- Megyei Bajnokság I – Bács-Kiskun: 2023–24
