= Adrian Zeljković =

Slovenian footballer (born 2002)

Personal information
- Date of birth: 19 August 2002 (age 24)
- Place of birth: Žalec, Slovenia
- Height: 1.92 m (6 ft 4 in)
- Position: Defensive midfielder

Team information
- Current team: MTK Budapest (on loan from Viktoria Plzeň)
- Number: 80

Youth career
- –2017: Žalec
- 2017: Maribor
- 2017–2018: Šampion
- 2018–2020: Celje
- 2020–2021: Olimpija Ljubljana

Senior career*
Years	Team	Apps	(Gls)
2020–2021	Olimpija Ljubljana	4	(0)
2021–2023	Tabor Sežana	37	(1)
2023–2025	Spartak Trnava	56	(5)
2025–	Viktoria Plzeň	13	(0)
2026–	→ MTK Budapest (loan)	13	(1)

International career^{‡}
2019	Slovenia U17	1	(0)
2022–2025	Slovenia U21	17	(2)
2024–	Slovenia	4	(0)
- * Club domestic league appearances and goals as of 30 June 2026 ‡ National team caps and goals as of 7 June 2026

Adrian Zeljković (born 19 August 2002) is a Slovenian footballer who plays as a defensive midfielder for Nemzeti Bajnokság I club MTK Budapest, on loan from Czech First League club Viktoria Plzeň, and for the Slovenia national team.

== Club career ==
Zeljković started playing football in his hometown of Žalec. He went on to play for the youth teams of several Slovenian football clubs, including Maribor, Celje and Olimpija Ljubljana, the latter of which he made his senior debut.

Zeljković joined Slovak club Spartak Trnava in July 2023, signing a four-year contract.

On 12 May 2025, Zeljković signed a four-year contract with Czech First League club Viktoria Plzeň for a reported transfer fee of €1.5 million. He made his European debut for the club in a 3–1 win over Servette, where he got sent off in the 66th minute.

On 3 February 2026, Zeljković joined MTK Budapest on a half-year loan deal with an option to make the transfer permanent.

== International career ==
In November 2023, Zeljković scored his first goal for the Slovenia under-21 team in a 1–1 friendly draw against Turkey. He made his debut for the senior team in a January 2024 friendly against the United States that ended 1–0 in Slovenia's favor thanks to a goal from Nejc Gradišar.

== Personal life ==
Zeljković's older brother Aleksandar is also a footballer.

== Honours ==
Spartak Trnava

- Slovak Cup: 2024–25

Individual

- Spartak Trnava Footballer of the Year: 2024
