= Vilius Armalas =

Lithuanian footballer (born 2000)

Personal information
- Date of birth: 21 July 2000 (age 26)
- Place of birth: Kaunas, Lithuania
- Height: 1.91 m (6 ft 3 in)
- Position: Defender

Team information
- Current team: MTK Budapest
- Number: 26

Youth career
- Stumbras

Senior career*
Years	Team	Apps	(Gls)
2016–2018	Stumbras	8	(0)
2019–2021	Benfica	0	(0)
2021	→ Hegelmann (loan)	32	(2)
2022	Kavala	18	(1)
2022–2025	Hegelmann	93	(8)
2025–	MTK Budapest	17	(0)

International career^{‡}
2023–	Lithuania	13	(0)
- * Club domestic league appearances and goals as of 1 September 2026 ‡ National team caps and goals as of 4 October 2026

Vilius Armalas (born 21 July 2000) is a Lithuanian professional footballer who plays as a defender for Hungarian Nemzeti Bajnokság I club MTK Budapest.

== Career ==
Before the second half of 2018–19, Armalas signed for Portuguese top flight side Benfica. Before the 2021 season, he was sent on loan to Hegelmann in Lithuania. Before the second half of 2021–22, he signed for Greek club Kavala. On 26 January 2022, Armalas debuted for Kavala during a 1–0 win over Trikala.

=== MTK Budapest ===
On 21 December 2025 Armalas signed for Hungarian Nemzeti Bajnokság I club MTK Budapest.
