= Marin Jurina =

Bosnian footballer

Personal information
- Date of birth: 26 November 1993 (age 32)
- Place of birth: Livno, Bosnia and Herzegovina
- Height: 1.88 m (6 ft 2 in)
- Position: Forward

Team information
- Current team: BG Pathum United
- Number: 20

Youth career
- 2004–2010: Sloga Uskoplje

Senior career*
Years	Team	Apps	(Gls)
2010–2012	Sloga Uskoplje		
2012–2013	Hajduk Split	0	(0)
2012	→ Primorac (loan)	15	(5)
2013	Zrinjski Mostar	0	(0)
2013–2014	Zadar	1	(0)
2014–2015	Etzella Ettelbruck	24	(7)
2015–2016	Čapljina	12	(5)
2016–2017	Koper	16	(2)
2017	→ Ankaran (loan)	5	(0)
2017–2018	Krško	17	(4)
2018–2020	Čelik Zenica	34	(3)
2019	→ Shkupi (loan)	16	(8)
2020–2022	Mezőkövesd	81	(21)
2022–2023	Al-Faisaly	16	(1)
2023–2024	Diósgyőr	7	(1)
2024–2026	MTK Budapest	73	(18)
- * Club domestic league appearances and goals

Marin Jurina (born 26 November 1993) is a professional Bosnian football centre-forward.

== Club career ==
On 22 January 2020 he signed a contract to Hungarian first division team Mezőkövesdi SE.

On 26 August 2022, Jurina joined Saudi club Al-Faisaly.

On 12 January 2024, Jurina moved to MTK Budapest.
