= Dávid Horváth (footballer) =

Hungarian association football player and manager

Personal information
- Full name: Dávid Horváth
- Date of birth: February 1, 1985 (age 41)
- Place of birth: Budapest, Hungary

Team information
- Current team: MTK Budapest (manager)

Senior career*
| Years | Team | Apps | (Gls) |
| 2006–2007 | Ferencvárosi TC | 35 | |
| 2007–2008 | Soroksár FC | | |
| 2007–2008 | Mosonmagyaróvári TE | | |
| 2008–2010 | Ceglédi VSE | | |
| 2010–2011 | Vecsési FC | | |
| 2012–2017 | Monori SE | | |

Managerial career
- 2016–2020: Monori SE
- 2020–2022: MTK Budapest U19
- 2022: MTK Budapest (interim)
- 2022–: MTK Budapest
- * Club domestic league appearances and goals

Dávid Horváth (born 1 February 1985 in Budapest) is a Hungarian football manager and former player.

== Career ==
He made 35 appearances in Ferencvárosi TC in the 2006–07 Nemzeti Bajnokság II season.

In the 2007–08 Nemzeti Bajnokság II season he played for Soroksár FC and Mosonmagyaróvári TE. However, both teams were relegated to the Nemzeti Bajnokság III.

He spent the 2008–09 Nemzeti Bajnokság II and the 2009–10 Nemzeti Bajnokság II season in Ceglédi VSE.

In the 2010-11 season he played for Vecsési FC.

Between 2012 and 2017, he played for Monori SE

== Managerial career ==
He was appointed as the manager of Monori SE in 2016. In 2020, he became the manager of the U19 team of MTK Budapest. In April 2022, he as appointed as an interim manager of MTK. In May 2022, he was appointed as the manager of MTK. In October, he was re-appointed as the manager of MTK Budapest FC.

In an interview with Büntető, Horváth said that it is too much to have ten football academies in Hungary.

On 7 November 2024, his contract with MTK Budapest was renewed.

== Managerial statistics ==
As of 27 October 2024

| Team | Nat | From | To | Record | | | | | | | |
| Team | Nat | From | To | P | W | D | L | GF | GA | GD | W% |
|---|---|---|---|---|---|---|---|---|---|---|---|
| MTK Budapest FC | Hungary | 24 October 2022 | present | 76 | 40 | 14 | 22 | 134 | 104 | +30 | 52.6 |
| Total | | | | 0 | 0 | 0 | 0 | 0 | 0 | +0 | — |

== Honours ==
Individual

- Nemzeti Bajnokság I Manager of the Month: October 2024
