= Zalán Kerezsi =

Hungarian footballer

Personal information
- Full name: Zalán Márk Kerezsi
- Date of birth: 17 July 2003 (age 23)
- Place of birth: Nyíregyháza, Hungary
- Height: 1.80 m (5 ft 11 in)
- Position: Centre-forward

Team information
- Current team: MTK Budapest FC
- Number: 20

Youth career
- 2012–2013: Nyíregyháza
- 2013–2018: Vasas
- 2018–2020: Budapest Honvéd

Senior career*
Years	Team	Apps	(Gls)
2020–	Budapest Honvéd	51	(17)
2020–	→ Budapest Honvéd II	53	(29)
2022	→ Siófok (loan)	3	(1)
2024–2025	→ Puskás Akadémia (loan)	21	(0)
2025–	→ MTK Budapest (loan)	26	(6)
- * Club domestic league appearances and goals as of 30 May 2026

Zalán Kerezsi (born 17 July 2003) is a Hungarian professional footballer who plays for MTK Budapest on loan from Budapest Honvéd.

== Career statistics ==
As of 15 May 2022.

Appearances and goals by club, season and competition
Club	Season	League			Cup		Continental		Other		Total		
Club	Season	Division	Apps	Goals	Apps	Goals	Apps	Goals	Apps	Goals	Apps	Goals	
Budapest Honvéd II	2020–21	Nemzeti Bajnokság III	27	11	—		—		—		27	11	
Budapest Honvéd II	2021–22	Nemzeti Bajnokság III	26	18	—		—		—		26	18	
Budapest Honvéd II	Total		53	29	0	0	0	0	0	0	53	29	
Siófok	2021–22	Nemzeti Bajnokság II	3	1	0	0	—		—		3	1	
Siófok	Total		3	1	0	0	0	0	0	0	3	1	
Budapest Honvéd	2020–21	Nemzeti Bajnokság I	5	0	0	0	0	0	—		1	0	
Budapest Honvéd	2022–23	Nemzeti Bajnokság I	14	4	1	1	—		—		14	4	
Budapest Honvéd	Total		19	4	1	1	0	0	0	0	7	0	
Budapest Honvéd	2023–24	Nemzeti Bajnokság II	28	11	1	1	—		—		28	11	
Budapest Honvéd	Total	Nemzeti Bajnokság II	28	11	1	1	0	0	0	0	7	0	
Budapest Honvéd	Career total	Nemzeti Bajnokság II		62	34	1	1	0	0	0	0	63	30
