= Patrik Demjén =

Hungarian footballer

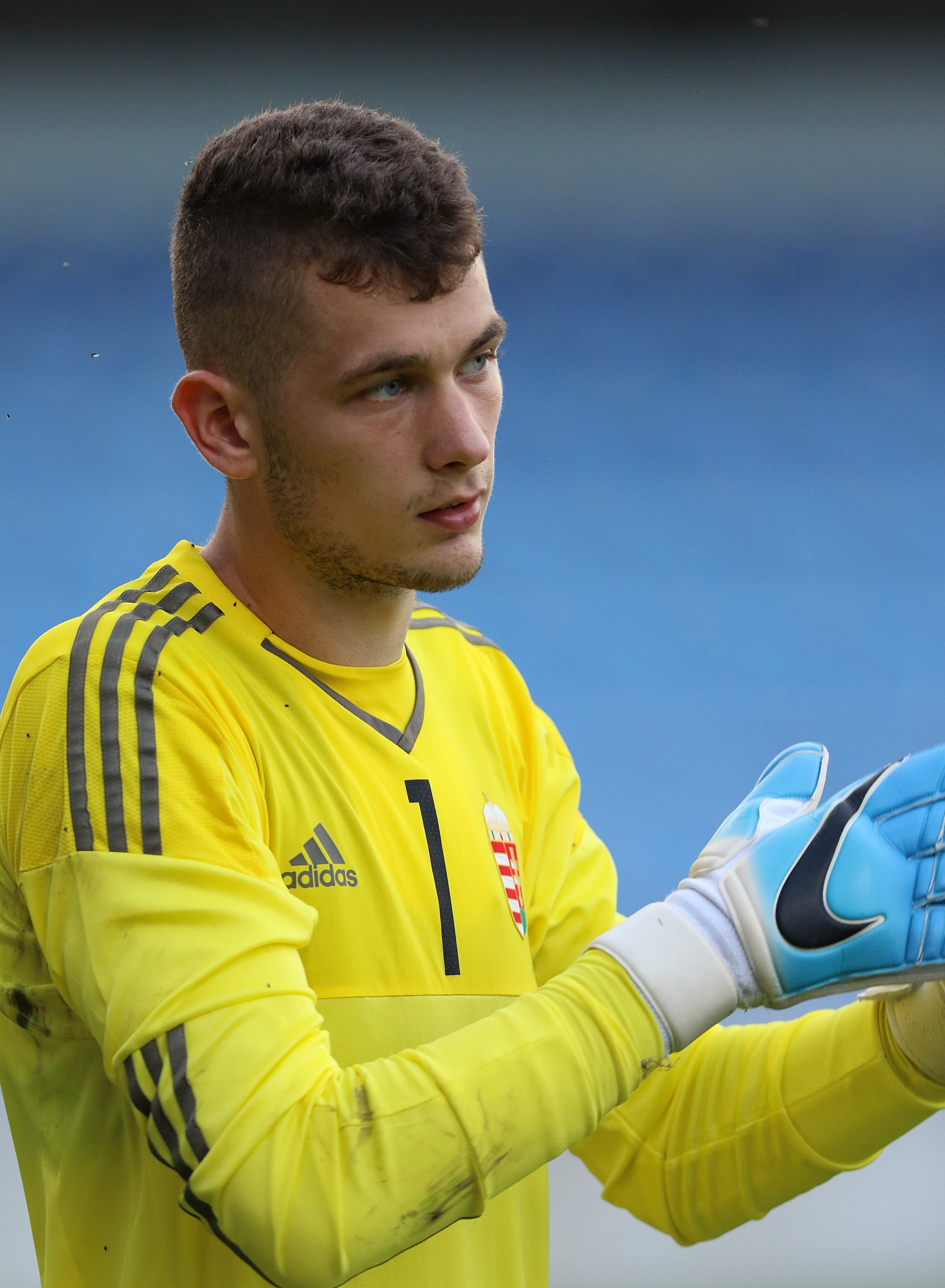
- Demjén in 2017

Personal information
- Date of birth: 22 March 1998 (age 28)
- Place of birth: Esztergom, Hungary
- Height: 1.86 m (6 ft 1 in)
- Position: Goalkeeper

Team information
- Current team: MTK

Youth career
- MTK Budapest

Senior career*
Years	Team	Apps	(Gls)
2015–2019	MTK Budapest	7	(0)
2016–2017	→ Dorog (loan)	12	(0)
2017–2019	→ Budaörs (loan)	47	(0)
2019–2023	Zalaegerszeg	126	(0)
2023–2026	MTK	78	(0)
2026–2026	Debrecen	3	(0)
2026–	MTK	0	(0)

International career^{‡}
2013	Hungary U16	7	(0)
2013–2014	Hungary U17	13	(0)
2015	Hungary U18	5	(0)
2015–2016	Hungary U19	17	(0)
2015	Hungary U20	1	(0)
2017–2020	Hungary U21	17	(0)
- * Club domestic league appearances and goals as of 12 June 2026 ‡ National team caps and goals as of 16 June 2023

Patrik Demjén (born 22 March 1998) is a Hungarian football player who plays for MTK Budapest FC.

== Career ==
On 28 January 2026, he signed with Nemzeti Bajnokság I club Debreceni VSC.

On 12 June 2026, Demjén signed with Nemzeti Bajnokság I club MTK.

== Career statistics ==
=== Club ===
As of match played 30 August 2025.

Appearances and goals by club, season and competition
Club	Season	League			Cup		Continental		Other		Total	
Club	Season	Division	Apps	Goals	Apps	Goals	Apps	Goals	Apps	Goals	Apps	Goals
Dorog	2016–17	Nemzeti Bajnokság II	12	0	1	0	—		—		13	0
MTK Budapest	2017–18	Nemzeti Bajnokság II	7	0	0	0	—		—		7	0
Budaörs	2017–18	Nemzeti Bajnokság II	11	0	0	0	—		—		11	0
Budaörs	2018–19	Nemzeti Bajnokság II	36	0	1	0	—		—		37	0
Budaörs	Total		47	0	1	0	0	0	0	0	48	0
Zalaegerszeg	2019–20	Nemzeti Bajnokság I	33	0	4	0	—		—		37	0
Zalaegerszeg	2020–21	Nemzeti Bajnokság I	29	0	0	0	—		—		29	0
Zalaegerszeg	2021–22	Nemzeti Bajnokság I	32	0	6	0	—		—		38	0
Zalaegerszeg	Total		94	0	10	0	0	0	0	0	104	0
MTK Budapest	2023–24	Nemzeti Bajnokság I	30	0	0	0	—		—		30	0
MTK Budapest	2024–25	Nemzeti Bajnokság I	31	0	0	0	—		—		31	0
MTK Budapest	2025–26	Nemzeti Bajnokság I	6	0	0	0	—		—		6	0
MTK Budapest	Total		67	0	0	0	—		—		67	0
Career total			227	0	12	0	0	0	0	0	239	0
