= Ádin Molnár =

Hungarian footballer (born 2004)

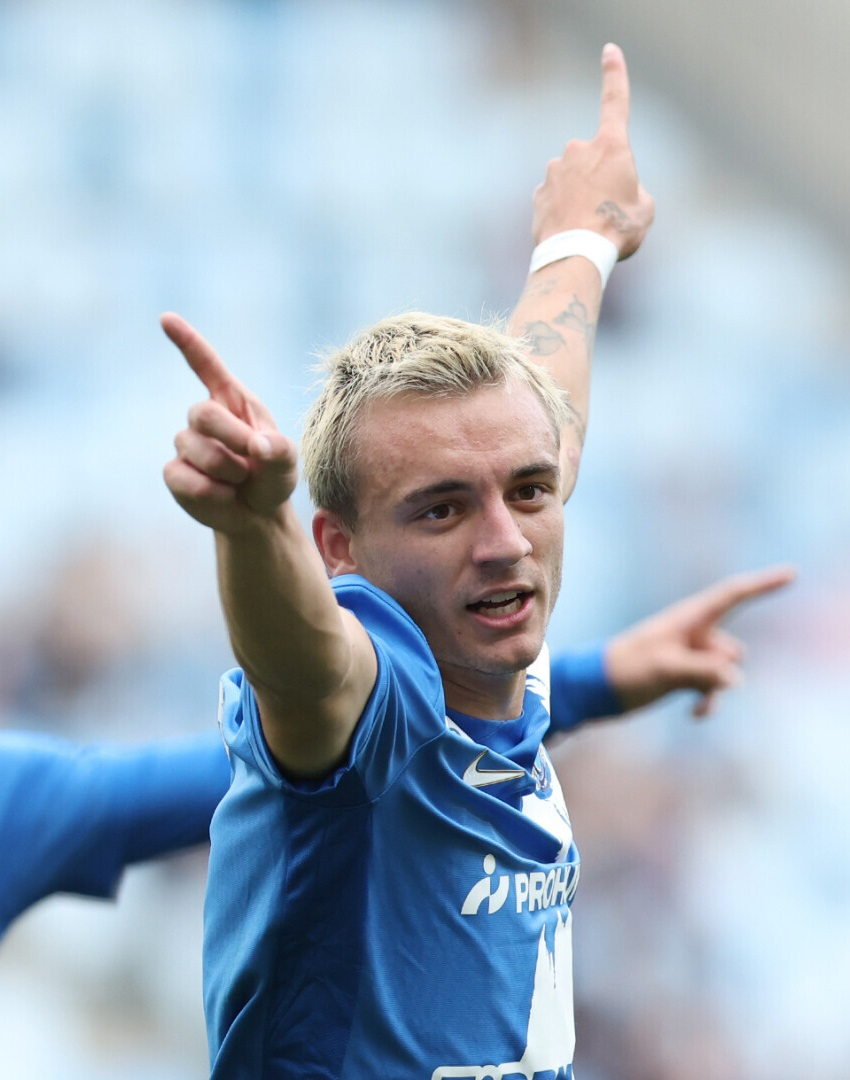
- Molnár playing for MTK in 2025

Personal information
- Date of birth: 18 June 2004 (age 22)
- Place of birth: Szeged, Hungary
- Height: 1.81 m (5 ft 11 in)
- Position: Forward

Team information
- Current team: Raków Częstochowa
- Number: 88

Youth career
- Tisza Volán
- 2012–2015: SZEOL
- 2015–2017: SZEAC
- 2017–2018: Szeged
- 2018–2020: Kecskemét

Senior career*
Years	Team	Apps	(Gls)
2020	Hódmezővásárhely II	10	(0)
2020–2022	Hódmezővásárhely	54	(13)
2022–2024	MTK Budapest II	18	(6)
2022–2026	MTK Budapest	65	(11)
2023–2024	→ Kozármisleny (loan)	32	(4)
2026–	Raków Częstochowa	3	(0)
- * Club domestic league appearances and goals as of 21:30, 28 August 2026 (UTC)

Ádin Molnár (born 18 June 2004) is a Hungarian professional footballer who plays as a forward for Ekstraklasa club Raków Częstochowa.

== Career ==
On 11 July 2022, Molnár signed a three-year contract with Nemzeti Bajnokság I club MTK, to play a role in the Nemzeti Bajnokság III reserve team.

On 13 July 2023, he was loaned out to Nemzeti Bajnokság II club Kozármisleny for the 2023–24 season.

On 13 July 2024, Molnár extended his contract with MTK after his successful loan spell and made the Hungary U20s and the first team at the club. On 3 August, he played his first match in a 3–0 win against Nyíregyháza in the first division. He scored his first goal for the club on 26 October, in a 4–1 league victory at home against Újpest.

On 8 July 2026, Molnár was transferred to Raków Częstochowa in Poland for an undisclosed fee. He signed a four-year contract with an option for another year.

== Career statistics ==
As of match played 27 August 2026

Appearances and goals by club, season and competition
Club	Season	League			National cup (Note: Includes Magyar Kupa)		Europe		Total	
Club	Season	Division	Apps	Goals	Apps	Goals	Apps	Goals	Apps	Goals
Hódmezővásárhely II	2020–21	Megyei Bajnokság I	10	0	—		—		10	0
Hódmezővásárhely	2020–21	Nemzeti Bajnokság III	19	4	1	0	—		20	4
Hódmezővásárhely	2021–22	Nemzeti Bajnokság III	35	9	2	0	—		37	9
Hódmezővásárhely	Total		54	13	3	0	—		57	13
MTK II	2021–22	Nemzeti Bajnokság III	16	4	—		—		16	4
MTK II	2024–25	Nemzeti Bajnokság III	2	2	—		—		2	2
MTK II	Total		18	6	—		—		18	6
MTK	2022–23	Nemzeti Bajnokság II	5	0	—		—		5	0
MTK	2024–25	Nemzeti Bajnokság I	28	1	5	0	—		33	1
MTK	2025–26	Nemzeti Bajnokság I	32	10	1	0	—		33	10
MTK	Total		65	11	6	0	—		71	11
Kozármisleny (loan)	2023–24	Nemzeti Bajnokság II	32	4	—		—		32	4
Raków Częstochowa	2026–27	Ekstraklasa	3	0	0	0	3 (Note: Appearances in UEFA Conference League)	1	6	1
Career total			182	34	9	0	3	1	194	35

== Honours ==
Individual

- Nemzeti Bajnokság I Player of the Month: September 2025
