= Zsombor Bévárdi =

Hungarian footballer

Personal information
- Date of birth: 30 January 1999 (age 27)
- Place of birth: Siófok, Hungary
- Height: 1.77 m (5 ft 10 in)
- Position: Right midfielder

Team information
- Current team: Paks
- Number: 11

Youth career
- 2007–2013: Siófok
- 2013–2014: Fehérvár
- 2014–2016: Puskás Akadémia

Senior career*
Years	Team	Apps	(Gls)
2016–2020	Fehérvár	0	(0)
2016–2017	→ Fehérvár II	24	(3)
2017–2018	→ Siófok (loan)	31	(1)
2018–2019	→ Vasas (loan)	27	(2)
2019–2020	→ Debrecen II (loan)	15	(4)
2020–2024	Debrecen	82	(6)
2020	→ Kaposvár (loan)	7	(3)
2024–2025	Puskás Akadémia	6	(0)
2024–2025	→ Budapest Honvéd (loan)	18	(2)
2025–2026	MTK	9	(0)
2026–	Paks	11	(0)

International career
2014	Hungary U16	1	(0)
2015	Hungary U17	2	(1)
2016	Hungary U18	3	(0)
2017–2018	Hungary U19	11	(8)
- * Club domestic league appearances and goals as of 30 May 2026

Zsombor Bévárdi (born 30 January 1999) is a Hungarian professional footballer who plays for Paks.

== Club career ==
He scored the equalizer against Budapest Honvéd FC in the final of 2016 Puskás Cup.

On 30 January 2024, Bévárdi returned to Puskás Akadémia on a two-and-a-half-year contract.

== Career statistics ==
As of 15 May 2022.

Appearances and goals by club, season and competition
Club	Season	League			Cup		Continental		Other		Total	
Club	Season	Division	Apps	Goals	Apps	Goals	Apps	Goals	Apps	Goals	Apps	Goals
Fehérvár	2016–17	Nemzeti Bajnokság I	0	0	2	1	0	0	—		2	1
Fehérvár	Total		0	0	2	1	0	0	0	0	2	1
Fehérvár II	2016–17	Nemzeti Bajnokság III	24	3	—		—		—		24	3
Fehérvár II	Total		24	3	0	0	0	0	0	0	24	3
Siófok	2017–18	Nemzeti Bajnokság II	31	1	3	0	—		—		34	1
Siófok	Total		31	1	3	0	0	0	0	0	34	1
Vasas	2018–19	Nemzeti Bajnokság II	27	2	2	1	—		—		29	3
Vasas	Total		27	2	2	1	0	0	0	0	29	3
Debrecen II	2019–20	Nemzeti Bajnokság III	10	3	—		—		—		10	3
Debrecen II	2020–21	Nemzeti Bajnokság III	5	1	—		—		—		5	1
Debrecen II	Total		15	4	0	0	0	0	0	0	15	4
Kaposvár	2019–20	Nemzeti Bajnokság I	7	3	0	0	—		—		7	3
Kaposvár	Total		7	3	0	0	0	0	0	0	7	3
Debrecen	2020–21	Nemzeti Bajnokság II	27	2	4	1	—		—		31	3
Debrecen	2021–22	Nemzeti Bajnokság I	27	3	2	0	—		—		29	3
Debrecen	Total		54	5	6	1	0	0	0	0	60	6
Career total			158	18	13	3	0	0	0	0	171	21
