= Péter Törőcsik =

Hungarian footballer (born 2001)

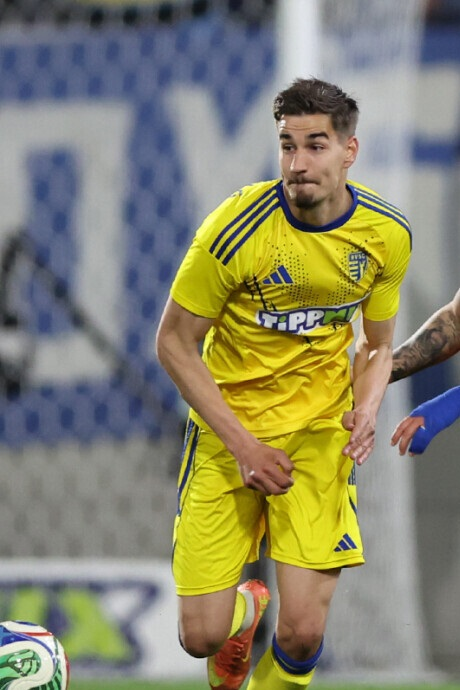
- Törőcsik playing for BVSC in 2026

Personal information
- Full name: Péter Tibor Törőcsik
- Date of birth: 27 June 2001 (age 25)
- Place of birth: Budapest, Hungary
- Height: 1.85 m (6 ft 1 in)
- Position: Midfielder

Team information
- Current team: MTK
- Number: 16

Youth career
- 2007–2008: Rákospalota
- 2008–2012: Újpest
- 2012–2020: MTK

Senior career*
Years	Team	Apps	(Gls)
2018–2023	MTK II	33	(10)
2019–2023	MTK	0	(0)
2020–2022	→ Szentlőrinc (loan)	42	(2)
2020–2022	→ Szentlőrinc II (loan)	11	(5)
2023–2025	Iváncsa	59	(29)
2025–	MTK	5	(1)
2025–	MTK II	5	(6)
2026	→ BVSC (loan)	15	(5)

International career
2015	Hungary U15	4	(0)
2016	Hungary U16	1	(0)
2017	Hungary U17	1	(0)
2019	Hungary U18	4	(0)
- * Club domestic league appearances and goals as of 17 May 2026

Péter Tibor Törőcsik (born 27 June 2001) is a Hungarian professional footballer who plays as a midfielder for Nemzeti Bajnokság I club MTK.

== Career ==
On 13 December 2025, Törőcsik scored his first Nemzeti Bajnokság I goal for MTK, equalising at 2–2 with a long-range strike after coming on as a substitute in a 4–3 home defeat against Újpest.

== Career statistics ==
=== Club ===
As of match played 17 May 2026

Appearances and goals by club, season and competition
Club	Season	League			Magyar Kupa		Total	
Club	Season	Division	Apps	Goals	Apps	Goals	Apps	Goals
MTK II	2017–18	Nemzeti Bajnokság III	1	0	—		1	0
MTK II	2022–23	Nemzeti Bajnokság III	32	10	—		32	10
MTK II	Total		33	10	—		33	10
MTK	2019–20	Nemzeti Bajnokság II	—		1	0	1	0
Szentlőrinc (loan)	2020–21	Nemzeti Bajnokság II	23	2	1	0	24	2
Szentlőrinc (loan)	2021–22	Nemzeti Bajnokság II	19	0	1	0	20	0
Szentlőrinc (loan)	Total		42	2	2	0	44	2
Szentlőrinc II (loan)	2020–21	Megyei Bajnokság I	2	1	—		2	1
Szentlőrinc II (loan)	2021–22	Megyei Bajnokság I	9	4	—		9	4
Szentlőrinc II (loan)	Total		11	5	—		11	5
Iváncsa	2023–24	Nemzeti Bajnokság III	29	10	1	0	30	10
Iváncsa	2024–25	Nemzeti Bajnokság III	30	19	4	8	34	27
Iváncsa	Total		59	29	5	8	64	37
MTK	2025–26	Nemzeti Bajnokság I	5	1	1	0	6	1
MTK II	2025–26	Nemzeti Bajnokság III	5	6	—		5	6
BVSC (loan)	2025–26	Nemzeti Bajnokság II	15	5	—		15	5
Career total			170	58	9	8	179	66

=== International ===
Appearances and goals by national team and year
Team	Year	Total	
Team	Year	Apps	Goals
Hungary U15	2015	4	0
Hungary U16	2016	1	0
Hungary U17	2017	1	0
Hungary U18	2019	4	0
Career total		10	0
