= 2025–26 Puskás Akadémia FC season =

Puskás Akadémia
2025–26 season
- Manager: Zsolt Hornyák
- Stadium: Pancho Aréna
- Nemzeti Bajnokság I: 6th
- Magyar Kupa: Round of 64
- UEFA Conference League: Second qualifying round
- Top goalscorer: League: Lukács (16); All: Lukács (16)
- Highest home attendance: 3,242 (v Ferencváros, Nemzeti Bajnokság, R15, 30 November 2025)
- Lowest home attendance: 500 (v Zalaegerszeg, Nemzeti Bajnokság, R21, 8 February 2026)
- Average home league attendance: 1,721
- Biggest win: 2 goals, (v Kazincbarcika, Nemzeti Bajnokság, R12, 1 November 2025)
- Biggest defeat: 3 goals, (1–4) v Vasas (A), Magyar Kupa, Round of 64; 13 September 2025
- All statistics correct as of 15 May 2026.

The 2025–26 season is the 21st season in the history of Puskás Akadémia FC, and the club's ninth consecutive season in the Nemzeti Bajnokság I. In addition to the domestic league, the team participates in the Magyar Kupa and the UEFA Conference League after coming 2nd place in the previous Nemzeti Bajnokság I (domestic league) season.

== Kits ==
Supplier: 2Rule / Sponsor: MBH Bank / Tippmix

Home	Away	Third	Third alt.

Goalkeeper^{1}	Goalkeeper^{2}	Goalkeeper^{3}

== First team squad ==
As of 12 September 2025

Note: Flags indicate national team as defined under FIFA eligibility rules; some limited exceptions apply. Players may hold more than one non-FIFA nationality.

No.	Pos.	Nation	Player
1	GK	HUN	Péter Szappanos
4	MF	ENG	Michael Okeke
6	MF	CPV	Laros Duarte
7	FW	GHA	Joel Fameyeh
8	FW	HUN	Dániel Lukács
9	FW	GAM	Lamin Colley
10	FW	HUN	Palkó Dárdai
14	DF	POL	Wojciech Golla
15	MF	ISR	Moshe Semel
16	MF	FIN	Urho Nissilä
17	DF	CZE	Patrizio Stronati
19	MF	UKR	Artem Favorov (vice-captain)
20	FW	FIN	Mikael Soisalo
21	DF	ARM	Georgy Arutyunyan
22	DF	HUN	Roland Szolnoki (captain)

No.	Pos.	Nation	Player
23	DF	SUI	Quentin Maceiras
24	GK	HUN	Tamás Markek
25	DF	HUN	Zsolt Nagy (vice-captain)
33	DF	ENG	Brandon Ormonde-Ottewill
57	GK	HUN	Martin Dala
61	GK	HUN	Mirkó Bozó
66	DF	HUN	Ákos Markgráf
74	MF	HUN	Martin Kern
76	DF	HUN	Barna Pál
77	FW	HUN	Kevin Mondovics
88	MF	HUN	Bence Vékony
90	FW	HUN	András Németh
96	DF	HUN	Roland Orján
99	FW	HUN	Zoárd Nagy

== Transfers ==
=== Summer ===
In
Date	No.	Pos.	Nat.	Player	Moving from	Fee	Ref.
14 June 2025	99	FW	Hungary	Zoárd Nagy	Csákvár (NB II)	Undisclosed	
16 June 2025	8	FW	Hungary	Dániel Lukács	Kecskemét	Undisclosed	
25 June 2025	90	FW	Hungary	András Németh	Hamburg	Undisclosed	
27 June 2025	57	GK	Hungary	Martin Dala	Fehérvár (NB II)	Undisclosed	
8 July 2025	10	FW	Hungary	Palkó Dárdai	Hertha BSC	Undisclosed	
16 July 2025	15	MF	Israel	Moshe Semel	Hapoel Rishon LeZion	Undisclosed	
30 July 2025	1	GK	Hungary	Péter Szappanos	Al Fateh	Undisclosed	
5 August 2025	74	MF	Hungary	Martin Kern	Sturm Graz	Undisclosed	
4 September 2025	TBD	MF	Hungary	Michael Okeke	Manchester City U21	Undisclosed	

Out
Date	No.	Pos.	Nat.	Player	Moving to	Fee	Ref.
27 May 2025	15	MF	Czech Republic	Jakub Plšek	MTK	Free	
27 May 2025	21	FW	Croatia	Jakov Puljić	Vukovar 1991		
7 June 2025	91	GK	Hungary	Ármin Pécsi	Liverpool	Undisclosed	
17 June 2025	10	FW	Sweden	Jonathan Levi	Ferencváros	Undisclosed	
27 June 2025		DF	Hungary	Olivér Kun	Kazincbarcika	Undisclosed	
29 July 2025		DF	Hungary	Viktor Vitályos	MTK	Undisclosed	

Out on loan
Date	No.	Pos.	Nat.	Player	Moving to	Loan date	Ref.
19 July 2025		DF	Hungary	Bendegúz Farkas	Nyíregyháza	30 June 2026	
23 July 2025		MF	Hungary	Marcell Major	Kazincbarcika	30 June 2026	
23 July 2025	72	GK	Hungary	Bendegúz Lehoczki	Csákvár (NB II)	30 June 2026	
11 August 2025	44	MF	Hungary	Szabolcs Dusinszki	Csíkszereda	30 June 2026	
12 August 2025	99	FW	Hungary	Zalán Kerezsi	MTK	30 June 2026	

=== Contract extension ===
Date	No.	Pos.	Nat.	Player	Extension to	Ref.
28 May 2025	66	DF	Hungary	Ákos Markgráf	30 June 2028	
25 August 2025	76	DF	Hungary	Barna Pál	30 June 2029	
3 September 2025	20	FW	Finland	Mikael Soisalo	30 June 2028	
18 September 2025		GK	Hungary	Mirkó Bozó	30 June 2030	
26 September 2025	77	FW	Hungary	Kevin Mondovics	30 June 2028	
17 October 2025	9	FW	The Gambia	Lamin Colley	30 June 2028	

== Friendlies ==
=== Pre-season ===
Puskás Akadémia started the preparation for the 2025/26 season in Bibione, Italy, from 16 June to 20 June 2025.

Summer training camp in Geinberg, Austria, from 5 July to 18 July 2025:

9 July 2025 Friendly	Austria Salzburg	1–3	Puskás Akadémia	Austria
18:30 CEST (UTC+02:00)	Denizcan Cosgun 26'	Report	A. Németh 61', 67'; Mondovics 80'
Note: • Puskás Akadémia: Markek (Dala (substituted on) 46') — Farkas (Markgráf (substituted on) 58'), Pál, Arutyunyan (Stronati (substituted on) 46'), Orján — Favorov (Nissilä (substituted on) 46'), Vékony — Dusinszki, Mondovics, Kerezsi — Z. Nagy (Colley (substituted on) 6' (substituted off) 58' (A. Németh (substituted on) 58')) • Manager: Hornyák

13 July 2025 Friendly	Crvena zvezda (Serbia)	1–1	Puskás Akadémia	Austria
18:00 CEST (UTC+02:00)	Milson (yellow card) 49'; Katai 52'	Report	Zs. Nagy 61' (pen.)
Note: • Puskás Akadémia: Markek — Maceiras, Golla, Stronati, Markgráf (P. Dárdai (substituted on) 62') — Soisalo (Dusinszki (substituted on) 73'), Arutyunyan (Favorov (substituted on) 73'), Duarte (Nissilä (substituted on) 46'), Zs. Nagy — Lukács (Fameyeh (substituted on) 46'), A. Németh (Colley (substituted on) 62') • Manager: Hornyák

16 July 2025 Friendly	Polissya Zhytomyr (Ukraine)	1–1	Puskás Akadémia	Austria
11:00 CEST (UTC+02:00)	Filippov 55'	Report	Fameyeh 21'
Note: • Puskás Akadémia: Markek — Maceiras, Golla, Stronati, P. Dárdai (Markgráf (substituted on) 57') — Soisalo (Dusinszki (substituted on) 57'), Arutyunyan (Favorov (substituted on) 70'), Duarte, Zs. Nagy (Lukács (substituted on) 77') — Fameyeh (Nissilä (substituted on) 28') (substituted off) 77' (Vékony (substituted on) 77')), A. Németh (Colley (substituted on) 46') • Manager: Hornyák

=== Mid-season ===
Winter training camp in Marbella, Spain from 4 January until 16 January 2026.

9 January 2026 Friendly	Lommel (Belgian II) (Belgium)	3–1	Puskás Akadémia	San Roque, Spain
12:00 (CET)	Tolinsson 81'; [Reumers 87'; Kujović 89'	Report	Fameyeh 31'	Stadium: Sotogrande Football Center
Note: • Puskás Akadémia: Markek (Dala (substituted on) 46') — Orján, Szolnoki, Stronati, Ormonde-Ottewill (Pál (substituted on) 46') — Favorov, Arutyunyan — Soisalo (Mondovics (substituted on) 46'), Fameyeh, Semel — A. Németh (Colley (substituted on) 46') • Manager: Hornyák

9 January 2026 Friendly	Genk (Belgian I) (Belgium)	1–0	Puskás Akadémia	Marbella, Spain
16:00 (CET)	Bibout 90+4'	Report		Stadium: La Quinta Football Center
Note: • Puskás Akadémia: Szappanos (Bozó (substituted on) 71') — Maceiras, Golla, Markgráf, Zs. Nagy — L. Duarte, Nissilä — Vékony (Kern (substituted on) 46'), Magyar (Z. Nagy (substituted on) 46'), P. Dárdai — Lukács (Ásványi (substituted on) 73') • Manager: Hornyák

12 January 2026 Friendly	Legia Warsaw (Polish I) (Poland)	1–1	Puskás Akadémia	San Roque, Spain
16:00 (CET)	W. Urbański (yellow card) 42'; Wszołek (yellow card) 44'; K. Urbański 58'; Jędrzejczyk (yellow card) 63'	Report	Nissilä (yellow card) 39'; Ormonde-Ottewill (yellow card) 42'; Mondovics 84'	Stadium: Banus Football Center
Note: • Puskás Akadémia: Szappanos — Arutyunyan (Maceiras (substituted on) 46'), Golla (Szolnoki (substituted on) 82'), Markgráf, Ormonde-Ottewill (Mondovics (substituted on) 62') — L. Duarte (Favorov (substituted on) 72'), Nissilä (Kern (substituted on) 72') — Soisalo (Ásványi (substituted on) 82'), Fameyeh (Magyar (substituted on) 72'), P. Dárdai (Zs. Nagy (substituted on) 46') — A. Németh (Lukács (substituted on) 46') • Manager: Hornyák

15 January 2026 Friendly	Slovan Liberec (Czech I) (Czech Republic)	1–0	Puskás Akadémia	San Roque, Spain
16:00	Masek 34'	Report	(yellow card) 21'; (yellow card) 60'	Stadium: Atalaya Football Center
Note: • Puskás Akadémia: Szappanos — Maceiras, Golla, Markgráf (Szolnoki (substituted on) 80'), Zs. Nagy — L. Duarte (Magyar (substituted on) 80'), Nissilä (Arutyunyan (substituted on) 46') — Soisalo (Vékony (substituted on) 80'), Lukács (Mondovics (substituted on) 46'), Kern (P. Dárdai (substituted on) 46') — Fameyeh (A. Németh (substituted on) 60') • Manager: Hornyák

== Competitions ==
=== Overall record ===
The Last match and the Final position achieved in competition(s) that have not yet been completed are indicated in italics.

Competition	First match	Last match	Starting round	Final position	Record							
Competition	First match	Last match	Starting round	Final position	Pld	W	D	L	GF	GA	GD	Win %
Nemzeti Bajnokság I	27 July 2025	15 May 2026	Matchday 1	6th	33	13	7	13	43	43	+0	39.39
Magyar Kupa	13 September 2025	13 September 2025	Round of 64	Round of 64	1	0	0	1	1	4	−3	0.00
UEFA Conference League	24 July 2025	31 July 2025	2nd qualifying round	2nd qualifying round	2	0	0	2	2	5	−3	0.00
Total					36	13	7	16	46	52	−6	36.11

Last updated: 15 May 2026
Source: Soccerway

=== Nemzeti Bajnokság I ===
==== League table ====
Pos	Team	Pld	W	D	L	GF	GA	GD	Pts	Qualification or relegation
4	Debrecen	33	14	11	8	51	41	+10	53	Qualification for the Conference League second qualifying round
5	Zalaegerszeg	33	13	9	11	49	43	+6	48	
6	Puskás Akadémia	33	13	7	13	43	43	0	46	
7	Újpest	33	11	7	15	48	57	−9	40	
8	Kisvárda	33	11	7	15	36	49	−13	40	

Source: Hungarian Football Federation (in Hungarian)
Rules for classification: 1) Points; 2) Matches won; 3) Goal difference; 4) Goals scored; 5) Head-to-head points; 6) Head-to-head goal difference; 7) Fair play ranking; 8) Drawing of lots.

==== Results summary ====
Overall								Home						Away					
Pld	W	D	L	GF	GA	GD	Pts	W	D	L	GF	GA	GD	W	D	L	GF	GA	GD
33	13	7	13	43	43	0	46	5	4	7	20	24	−4	8	3	6	23	19	+4

Last updated: 15 May 2026.
Source: Soccerway

==== Matches ====
Win Draw Loss Fixtures Postponed

The draw for the 2025/26 season was held on 16 June 2025.

27 July 2025 1	Puskás Akadémia	2–1	Kazincbarcika	Felcsút
20:00 CEST	Colley 47', 52'; Maceiras (yellow card) 57'	Report	Ferencsik (yellow card) 90+1'; B. Sós 90+2'	Stadium: Pancho Aréna; Attendance: 1,284; Referee: József Erdős; Assistant referees: Dániel Szalai, Viktor Nagy
Note: • Puskás Akadémia: Markek — Maceiras, Golla, Stronati, Markgráf — Soisalo (Dusinszki (substituted on) 60'), L. Duarte (Arutyunyan (substituted on) 77'), Favorov, Zs. Nagy (c) (Mondovics (substituted on) 84') — Lukács (P. Dárdai (substituted on) 46'), Colley (A. Németh (substituted on) 60') • Manager: Hornyák • Player of the match: Lamin Colley, Puskás Akadémia 10.0 • Best player of Kazincbarcika: Bence Sós 7.5

3 August 2025 2	Puskás Akadémia	3–2	Nyíregyháza	Felcsút
17:45 CEST	Lukács 26'; Vékony (yellow card) 41'; Zs. Nagy (yellow card) 43'; Golla (yellow card) 47'; Favorov (yellow card) 52'; P. Dárdai 84'; Fameyeh 86'	Report	Benczenleitner 2'; Evangelou 44'; Alaxai (yellow card) 56'; D. Nagy (yellow card) 75'; Korrea (yellow card) 89' (yellow-red card) 90'	Stadium: Pancho Aréna; Attendance: 1,526; Referee: Márton Rúsz; Assistant referees: Vencel Tóth II, Péter Kóbor
Note: • Puskás Akadémia: Dala — Maceiras, Golla, Stronati, Markgráf — L. Duarte (Fameyeh (substituted on) 76'), Favorov (Semel (substituted on) 63' (substituted off) 89' (Arutyunyan (substituted on) 89')) — Vékony (Nissilä (substituted on) 63'), Lukács, Zs. Nagy (c) — A. Németh (P. Dárdai (substituted on) 63') • Manager: Hornyák • Player of the match: Barna Benczenleitner, Nyíregyháza 7.9 • Best player of Puskás Akadémia: Joel Fameyeh 7.6

10 August 2025 3	Kisvárda	2–1	Puskás Akadémia	Kisvárda
17:45 CEST	Chlumecký 20'; Mešanović (yellow card) 25'; G. Molnár 45+4'	Report	Favorov (penalty missed) 26' 26'; Golla (yellow card) 61'; Markgráf (yellow card) 83'	Stadium: Várkerti Stadion; Attendance: 1,980; Referee: Imre Kovács; Assistant referees: Balázs Buzás, József Aradi
Note: • Puskás Akadémia: Szappanos — Maceiras (Soisalo (substituted on) 78'), Golla, Stronati, Markgráf — Favorov (c), Arutyunyan (L. Duarte (substituted on) 59') — Lukács, Kern (Vékony (substituted on) 28'), P. Dárdai (Semel (substituted on) 59') — A. Németh (Fameyeh (substituted on) 46') • Manager: Hornyák • Player of the match: Martin Chlumecký, Kisvárda 8.0 • Best player of Puskás Akadémia: Artem Favorov 7.7

16 August 2025 4	Ferencváros	1–2	Puskás Akadémia	Budapest
20:15 CEST	Cadu 24' (yellow card) 89'; Joseph (yellow card) 90+4'	Report	Lukács 20', 71'; Soisalo (yellow card) 76'; Arutyunyan (yellow card) 76'; Favorov (yellow card) 89'	Stadium: Ferencváros Stadion; Attendance: 10,679; Referee: Ferenc Karakó; Assistant referees: Ákos Berélnyi, Péter Ország
Note: • Puskás Akadémia: Szappanos — Markgráf (Ormonde-Ottewill (substituted on) 83'), Golla, Stronati, Maceiras — L. Duarte (Arutyunyan (substituted on) 65'), Favorov (c) — Soisalo (Vékony (substituted on) 83'), P. Dárdai (Szolnoki (substituted on) 72'), Fameyeh (Colley (substituted on) 72') — Lukács • Manager: Hornyák • Player of the match: Dániel Lukács, Puskás Akadémia 8.8 • Best player of Ferencváros: Cadu and Jonathan Levi 7.7 each

22 August 2025 5	Puskás Akadémia	1–3	Debrecen	Felcsút
20:00 CEST	Lukács 62'; Favorov (yellow card) 56'	Report	Dzsudzsák 45' (yellow card) 78'; Batik (yellow card) 63'; T. Szűcs 86'; Kulbachuk 90+1'	Stadium: Pancho Aréna; Attendance: 1,896; Referee: Péter Zierkelbach; Assistant referees: Gergő Vígh-Tarsonyi, József Aradi
Note: • Puskás Akadémia: Szappanos — Maceiras, Golla, Stronati, Markgráf — Vékony (Nissilä (substituted on) 56'), Favorov (Arutyunyan (substituted on) 85') — Soisalo (Semel (substituted on) 75'), Lukács, Zs. Nagy (c) (P. Dárdai (substituted on) 85') — Fameyeh (Z. Nagy (substituted on) 56') • Manager: Hornyák • Player of the match: Tamás Szűcs, Debrecen 8.5 • Best player of Puskás Akadémia: Dániel Lukács 7.7

30 August 2025 6	Diósgyőr	1–1	Puskás Akadémia	Miskolc
17:00 CEST	Maceiras 12' (o.g.); Roguljić (yellow card) 51'; Bényei (yellow card) 84'	Report	Zs. Nagy 49' (pen.); Markgráf (yellow card) 61'; Lukács (yellow card) 88'	Stadium: Diósgyőri Stadion; Attendance: 5,004; Referee: Ferenc Karakó; Assistant referees: Balázs Buzás, Viktor Nagy
Note: • Puskás Akadémia: Szappanos — Maceiras, Golla, Stronati, Markgráf — Vékony (Soisalo (substituted on) 85'), Favorov, L. Duarte, Zs. Nagy (c) — Lukács, Colley (Z. Nagy (substituted on) 90+2') • Manager: Hornyák • Player of the match: Patrizio Stronati, Puskás Akadémia 8.9 • Best player of Diósgyőr: Dániel Gera 7.4

20 September 2025 7	Puskás Akadémia	0–2	Győr	Felcsút
20:15 CEST	Zs. Nagy (yellow card) 48'; Maceiras (yellow card) 58'	Report	Anton 12' (pen.); Benbouali 24'; Gavrić (yellow card) 62'; R. Tóth (yellow card) 82'	Stadium: Pancho Aréna; Attendance: 2,739; Referee: Balázs Berke; Assistant referees: Gergő Vígh-Tarsonyi, József Aradi
Note: • Puskás Akadémia: Szappanos — Maceiras, Golla (Arutyunyan (substituted on) 29'), Stronati, Markgráf — Favorov — Soisalo (P. Dárdai (substituted on) 57'), Lukács (Colley (substituted on) 57'), Okeke (Vékony (substituted on) 76'), Zs. Nagy (c) — A. Németh (Z. Nagy (substituted on) 76') • Manager: Hornyák • Player of the match: Paul Anton, Győri ETO 8.0 • Best player of Puskás Akadémia: Michael Okeke 8.0

27 September 2025 8	Paks	3–2	Puskás Akadémia	Paks
20:00 CEST	Gyurkits 39', 87' (pen.); B. Tóth (yellow card) 65'; Ke. Horváth (yellow card) 73'; Papp (yellow card) 73'; Windecker 89'	Report	Lukács 8'; A. Németh 49'; Arutyunyan (yellow card) 67'; Szappanos (yellow card) 69'; Okeke (yellow card) 76'; Zs. Nagy (yellow card) 81'; Z. Nagy (yellow card) 88'	Stadium: Fehérvári úti Stadion; Attendance: 2,400; Referee: Gergő Bogár; Assistant referees: Vencel Tóth II, Viktor Nagy
Note: • Puskás Akadémia: Szappanos — Maceiras, Golla, Arutyunyan, Markgráf — Szolnoki (c) (Favorov (substituted on) 76'), Okeke (Stronati (substituted on) 76') — P. Dárdai (Vékony (substituted on) 76'), Lukács (L. Duarte (substituted on) 88'), Zs. Nagy — A. Németh (Z. Nagy (substituted on) 88') • Manager: Hornyák • Player of the match: Gergő Gyurkits, Paks 8.3 • Best player of Puskás Akadémia: András Németh 8.2

4 October 2025 9	Puskás Akadémia	0–0	Újpest	Felcsút
17:00 CEST	Okeke (yellow card) 30'	Report	João Nunes (yellow card) 39'; Geiger (yellow card) 90+3'	Stadium: Pancho Aréna; Attendance: 2,388; Referee: Tamás Bognár; Assistant referees: Balázs Buzás, Péter Kóbor
Note: • Puskás Akadémia: Szappanos — Maceiras, Golla, Arutyunyan, Ormonde-Ottewill — L. Duarte, Okeke (Vékony (substituted on) 87') — P. Dárdai (Soisalo (substituted on) 62'), Lukács (Kern (substituted on) 90+1'), Zs. Nagy (c) — A. Németh (Z. Nagy (substituted on) 87') • Manager: Hornyák • Player of the match: Brandon Ormonde-Ottewill, Puskás Akadémia 8.4 • Best player of Újpest: André Duarte 7.9

19 October 2025 10	Zalaegerszeg	0–1	Puskás Akadémia	Zalaegerszeg
15:30 CEST	Csonka (yellow card) 29'; B. Kiss (yellow card) 60'; Amato (yellow card) 77'; Szendrei (yellow card) 86'; Krajcsovics (yellow card) 90+6'	Report	Ormonde-Ottewill (yellow card) 36'; Lukács 71'; Colley (yellow card) 77'	Stadium: ZTE Arena; Attendance: 3,612; Referee: Imre Kovács; Assistant referees: Balázs Huszár, Zoltán Horváth
Note: • Puskás Akadémia: Szappanos — Maceiras, Golla, Markgráf, Ormonde-Ottewill (Arutyunyan (substituted on) 61') — Okeke (Favorov (substituted on) 61'), L. Duarte, Fameyeh (Kern (substituted on) 61'), Zs. Nagy (c) — Lukács (Szolnoki (substituted on) 81'), A. Németh (Colley (substituted on) 46') • Manager: Hornyák • Player of the match: Dániel Lukács, Puskás Akadémia 7.7 • Best player of Zalaegerszeg: Gergő Bodnár 7.5

25 October 2025 11	Puskás Akadémia	1–1	MTK	Felcsút
14:30 CEST	Markgráf (red card) 6'; Kern 18'; Maceiras (yellow card) 62'	Report	Beriashvili (yellow card) 16'; P. Kovács (yellow card) 49'; Átrok 72'; Á. Molnár (yellow card) 90+2'	Stadium: Pancho Aréna; Attendance: 1,387; Referee: Bence Csonka dr. Assistant referees: Georgiou Theodors, Bence Belicza
Note: • Puskás Akadémia: Szappanos — Maceiras, Golla (c), Arutyunyan, Markgráf — Soisalo (Kern (substituted on) 13'), L. Duarte, Okeke (Favorov (substituted on) 70'), P. Dárdai (Stronati (substituted on) 46') — Colley (A. Németh (substituted on) 46' (substituted off) 79' (Szolnoki (substituted on) 79')), Lukács • Manager: Hornyák • Player of the match: Benedek Varju, MTK 7.6 • Best player of Puskás Akadémia: Péter Szappanos 7.6

1 November 2025 12	Kazincbarcika	1–3	Puskás Akadémia	Kazincbarcika
13:15 CET	Šlogar 37'; Meskhi (yellow card) 74'; Deutsch (yellow card) 90'	Report	P. Dárdai 29'; Golla (yellow card) 54'; Szolnoki (yellow card) 55'; Golla 85'; Lukács 90+4'	Stadium: Kolorcity Aréna; Attendance: 636; Referee: Mihály Káprály; Assistant referees: István Albert, Gergő Vígh-Tarsonyi
Note: • Puskás Akadémia: Szappanos — Maceiras, Golla, Arutyunyan, Favorov — Okeke (Kern (substituted on) 55') — Vékony (Colley (substituted on) 70'), L. Duarte (Nissilä (substituted on) 90+1'), Szolnoki (c), P. Dárdai (Soisalo (substituted on) 70') — Lukács • Manager: Hornyák • Player of the match: Wojciech Golla, Puskás Akadémia 8.2 • Best player of Kazincbarcika: Martin Šlogar 7.3

9 November 2025 13	Nyíregyháza	1–1	Puskás Akadémia	Nyíregyháza
17:30 CET	Manner (yellow card) 1'; Edomwonyi (yellow card) 38' (goal) 41'; D. Kovács (yellow card) 90+3'	Report	Szolnoki (yellow card) 26'; Maceiras (yellow card) 73'; Antonov 90+1' (o.g.)	Stadium: Városi Stadion; Attendance: 3,927; Referee: Márton Rúsz; Assistant referees: Balázs Szert, Ákos Berényi
Note: • Puskás Akadémia: Szappanos — Maceiras, Golla, Markgráf, Ormonde-Ottewill — Szolnoki (c) (Favorov (substituted on) 57'), Okeke (Kern (substituted on) 65') — P. Dárdai (Colley (substituted on) 57'), L. Duarte, Zs. Nagy (Fameyeh (substituted on) 82') — Lukács • Manager: Hornyák • Player of the match: Laros Duarte, Puskás Akadémia 7.8 • Best player of Nyíregyháza: Bálint Katona 7.5

22 November 2025 14	Puskás Akadémia	2–0	Kisvárda	Felcsút
14:30 CET	Lukács 40', 78'	Report	Matanović (yellow card) 63'	Stadium: Pancho Aréna; Attendance: 783; Referee: Marcell Derdák; Assistant referees: Balázs Huszár, Zoltán Horváth
Note: • Puskás Akadémia: Szappanos — Maceiras, Golla, Markgráf, Ormonde-Ottewill (Arutyunyan (substituted on) 90+1') — L. Duarte, Okeke (Kern (substituted on) 80') — Lukács, P. Dárdai (Favorov (substituted on) 80'), Zs. Nagy (c) (Szolnoki (substituted on) 90+1') — Colley (Fameyeh (substituted on) 70') • Manager: Hornyák • Player of the match: Dániel Lukács, Puskás Akadémia 8.5 • Best player of Kisvárda: Martin Chlumecký 7.4

30 November 2025 15	Puskás Akadémia	1–2	Ferencváros	Felcsút
19:30 CET	Okeke (yellow card) 43'; Markgráf (yellow card) 57'; P. Dárdai 67'	Report	Romão (yellow card) 45'; Kanichowsky 54'; Gruber 60' (pen.)	Stadium: Pancho Aréna; Attendance: 3,242; Referee: Márton Rúsz; Assistant referees: Péter Kóbor, Péter Ország
Note: • Puskás Akadémia: Szappanos — Maceiras (Arutyunyan (substituted on) 23'), Markgráf, Golla, Ormonde-Ottewill (Fameyeh (substituted on) 78') — L. Duarte — Lukács, Okeke (Vékony (substituted on) 60'), P. Dárdai, Zs. Nagy (c) — Colley (A. Németh (substituted on) 78') • Manager: Hornyák • Player of the match: Gabi Kanichowsky, Ferencváros 7.8 • Best player of Puskás Akadémia: Palkó Dárdai 7.7

6 December 2025 16	Debrecen	0–1	Puskás Akadémia	Debrecen
14:45 CET	Batik (yellow card) 52'; Cibla (yellow card) 73'	Report	Lukács (yellow card) 24'; Zs. Nagy 37'; Favorov (yellow card) 40'; Szolnoki (yellow card) 49'; Markgráf (yellow card) 52'; Szappanos (yellow card) 54'	Stadium: Nagyerdei Stadion; Attendance: 4,767; Referee: Péter Zierkelbach; Assistant referees: István Albert, Bence Belicza
Note: • Puskás Akadémia: Szappanos — Markgráf, Golla, Szolnoki, Ormonde-Ottewill — Favorov, L. Duarte — P. Dárdai (Soisalo (substituted on) 80'), Vékony (Arutyunyan (substituted on) 90+1'), Zs. Nagy (c) — Lukács (Kern (substituted on) 90+1') • Manager: Hornyák • Player of the match: Balázs Dzsudzsák, Debrecen 8.1 • Best player of Puskás Akadémia: Dániel Lukács 8.0

13 December 2025 17	Puskás Akadémia	2–1	Diósgyőr	Felcsút
16:30 CET	Lukács 19', 47'; Szolnoki (yellow card) 77'	Report	Acolatse 10'; Mi. Mucsányi (yellow card) 16'	Stadium: Pancho Aréna; Attendance: 1,026; Referee: Imre Kovács; Assistant referees: József Aradi, Viktor Nagy
Note: • Puskás Akadémia: Szappanos — Favorov, Golla, Markgráf, Ormonde-Ottewill — Szolnoki (c), L. Duarte — P. Dárdai (Kern (substituted on) 80'), Vékony (Okeke (substituted on) 66'), Zs. Nagy (Soisalo (substituted on) 80') — Lukács (Fameyeh (substituted on) 90+1') • Manager: Hornyák • Player of the match: Dániel Lukács, Puskás Akadémia 8.3 • Best player of Diósgyőr: Elton Acolatse 7.7

20 December 2025 18	Győr	2–0	Puskás Akadémia	Győr
18:00 CET	Benbouali 1'; Krpić (yellow card) 41'; Vingler (yellow card) 53'; Njie 83'	Report	Szolnoki (yellow card) 20'; P. Dárdai (yellow card) 38'; Okeke (yellow card) 52'; Favorov (yellow card) 67'; L. Duarte (yellow card) 72'	Stadium: ETO Park; Attendance: 4,219; Referee: Péter Antal; Assistant referees: Péter Kóbor, Ákos Berényi
Note: • Puskás Akadémia: Szappanos — Favorov, Golla, Markgráf, Ormonde-Ottewill — Szolnoki (c) (Colley (substituted on) 46'), L. Duarte — Okeke (Kern (substituted on) 63'), P. Dárdai (Soisalo (substituted on) 63'), Zs. Nagy — Lukács (Vékony (substituted on) 89') • Manager: Hornyák • Player of the match: Ștefan Vlădoiu, Győri ETO 8.0 • Best player of Puskás Akadémia: Péter Szappanos 7.1

24 January 2026 19	Puskás Akadémia	1–2	Paks	Felcsút
19:45 CET	Ásványi (yellow card) 15'; Zs. Nagy 23' (pen.) (yellow card) 30'; Vékony (yellow card) 50'; Markgráf (yellow card) 89'; L. Duarte (yellow card) 90+4'	Report	Ke. Horváth 17' (pen.); Kovácsik (yellow card) 21'; Osváth 84'	Stadium: Pancho Aréna; Attendance: 789; Referee: Ferenc Karakó; Assistant referees: Zoltán Horváth, Péter Ország
Note: • Puskás Akadémia: Szappanos — Maceiras, Golla, Markgráf, Zs. Nagy (c) — Soisalo (Arutyunyan (substituted on) 81'), L. Duarte, Ásványi (Nissilä (substituted on) 46') — Fameyeh (A. Németh (substituted on) 77'), Lukács, P. Dárdai (Vékony (substituted on) 19') • Manager: Hornyák • Player of the match: Péter Szappanos, Puskás Akadémia 9.2 • Best player of Paks: Attila Osváth 9.0

31 January 2026 20	Újpest	0–1	Puskás Akadémia	Budapest
18:30 CET	João Nunes (yellow card) 44'	Report	Golla (yellow card) 65'; Lukács (yellow card) 77'; Fameyeh 80' (yellow card) 81'	Stadium: Szusza Ferenc Stadion; Attendance: 4,078; Referee: Mihály Káprály; Assistant referees: Péter Kóbor, Balázs Huszár
Note: • Puskás Akadémia: Szappanos — Maceiras, Golla, Arutyunyan, Favorov — Lukács, Okeke, L. Duarte, Zs. Nagy (c) (Soisalo (substituted on) 46') — Fameyeh (Szolnoki (substituted on) 86'), Mondovics (Kern (substituted on) 78') • Manager: Hornyák • Player of the match: Joel Fameyeh, Puskás Akadémia 7.8 • Best player of Újpest: Matija Ljujić 7.6

8 February 2026 21	Puskás Akadémia	0–1	Zalaegerszeg	Felcsút
15:00 CET	Okeke (yellow card) 29'	Report	Skribek 50'; Peraza (yellow card) 85'; João Victor (yellow card) 89'	Stadium: Pancho Aréna; Attendance: 500; Referee: Márió Zimmermann; Assistant referees: Zoltán Horváth, József Aradi
Note: • Puskás Akadémia: Szappanos — Maceiras (Soisalo (substituted on) 68'), Golla, Arutyunyan (P. Dárdai (substituted on) 86'), Markgráf — Favorov (Mondovics (substituted on) 46'), L. Duarte, Okeke (Nissilä (substituted on) 46'), Zs. Nagy (c) — Fameyeh (A. Németh (substituted on) 68'), Lukács • Manager: Hornyák • Player of the match: Bence Gundel-Takács, Zalaegerszeg 8.4 • Best player of Puskás Akadémia: Laros Duarte 7.4

14 February 2026 22	MTK	2–2	Puskás Akadémia	Budapest
14:45 CET	Kata (yellow card) 32'; Varju (yellow card) 33' (goal) 80'; Kádár (yellow card) 50'; Zeljković 60'; H. Németh (yellow card) 66'; Bognár (yellow card) 90+2'	Report	Zs. Nagy 15' (pen.), 35' (pen.); Soisalo (yellow card) 44'; Magyar (yellow card) 47'; L. Duarte (yellow card) 52'; Szolnoki (yellow card) 88'; Markgráf (yellow card) 90+1'	Stadium: Hidegkuti Nándor Stadion; Attendance: 1,500; Referee: Márton Rúsz; Assistant referees: Georgiou Theodoros, Péter Ország
Note: • Puskás Akadémia: Szappanos — Maceiras, Golla, Markgráf, Zs. Nagy — Szolnoki (c) — Soisalo (P. Dárdai (substituted on) 76'), L. Duarte (Favorov (substituted on) 81'), Magyar (Kern (substituted on) 67'), Mondovics (Fameyeh (substituted on) 67') — Lukács (Vékony (substituted on) 81') • Manager: Hornyák • Player of the match: Adrian Zeljković, MTK 7.9 • Best player of Puskás Akadémia: Péter Szappanos 7.6

21 February 2026 23	Kazincbarcika	0–2	Puskás Akadémia	Miskolc
16:15 CET	Rácz (yellow card) 19'; Nyíri (yellow card) 46'; Kártik (yellow card) 50'	Report	Golla 5' (yellow card) 30'; Szolnoki (yellow card) 23'; Lukács 40'; Maceiras (yellow card) 78'; Kern (yellow card) 88'	Stadium: DVTK Stadion; Attendance: 320; Referee: Ferenc Karakó; Assistant referees: Balázs Szert, Bence Belicza
Note: • Puskás Akadémia: Szappanos — Maceiras, Golla, Markgráf, Zs. Nagy — L. Duarte, Szolnoki (c), Magyar (P. Dárdai (substituted on) 76') — Lukács (Kern (substituted on) 86'), Mondovics (Vékony (substituted on) 67') — Fameyeh (A. Németh (substituted on) 76') • Manager: Hornyák • Player of the match: Wojciech Golla, Puskás Akadémia 8.5 • Best player of Kazincbarcika: Milán Klausz 7.3

1 March 2026 24	Puskás Akadémia	1–2	Nyíregyháza	Felcsút
16:15 CET	P. Dárdai 68'; Markgráf (yellow card) 80'	Report	M. Kovács (yellow card) 38'; Kvasina 45+2' (pen.) (yellow card) 81'; Drešković (yellow card) 50'; Tijani (yellow card) 55'; L. Katona (yellow card) 59'; M. Katona 78'; Jovanov (yellow card) 86'	Stadium: Pancho Aréna; Attendance: 1,810; Referee: Attila Molnár; Assistant referees: Péter Garai, Viktor Nagy
Note: • Puskás Akadémia: Szappanos — Szolnoki (c) (Semel (substituted on) 83'), Arutyunyan, Markgráf, Zs. Nagy — L. Duarte, Favorov — Lukács (Soisalo (substituted on) 77'), Magyar (P. Dárdai (substituted on) 60'), Mondovics (Kern (substituted on) 60') — Fameyeh (A. Németh (substituted on) 60') • Manager: Hornyák • Player of the match: Nemanja Antonov, Nyíregyháza 7.8 • Best player of Puskás Akadémia: Palkó Dárdai 7.4

6 March 2026 25	Kisvárda	1–0	Puskás Akadémia	Kisvárda
20:00 CET	Matanović (yellow card) 10'; Zs. Nagy 16' (o.g.); Mbock (yellow card) 28'; Novothny (yellow card) 54'; Popoola (yellow card) 66'; Be. Bíró (yellow card) 79'; Popovych (yellow card) 86'	Report	Kern (yellow card) 21'	Stadium: Várkerti Stadion; Attendance: 1,783; Referee: Gergő Bogár; Assistant referees: Vencel Tóth II, Gergő Vígh-Tarsonyi
Note: • Puskás Akadémia: Szappanos — Maceiras, Golla, Arutyunyan, Markgráf — Lukács, L. Duarte, Kern (Mondovics (substituted on) 76') — P. Dárdai (Magyar (substituted on) 68'), A. Németh (Fameyeh (substituted on) 76'), Zs. Nagy (c) (Soisalo (substituted on) 68') • Manager: Hornyák • Player of the match: Nikola Radmanovac, Kisvárda 7.6 • Best player of Puskás Akadémia: Georgy Arutyunyan 7.2

22 March 2026 27	Puskás Akadémia	1–1	Debrecen	Felcsút
14:30 CET	Lukács 30'; A. Németh (yellow card) 46'; Lukács (yellow card) 87'	Report	Bárány 24' (pen.); Gordić (yellow card) 43'; Mejias (yellow card) 56'; Lang (yellow card) 90+3'	Stadium: Pancho Aréna; Attendance: 1,600; Referee: Ferenc Karakó; Assistant referees: Vencel Tóth II, Zoltán Horváth
Note: • Puskás Akadémia: Szappanos — Orján, Golla, Markgráf, Zs. Nagy (c) — L. Duarte, P. Dárdai (Mondovics (substituted on) 84'), Kern (Magyar (substituted on) 78'), Semel (Soisalo (substituted on) 78') — Lukács, A. Németh (Fameyeh (substituted on) 68') • Manager: Hornyák • Player of the match: Benedek Erdélyi, Debrecen 8.1 • Best player of Puskás Akadémia: Dániel Lukács 7.3

5 April 2026 28	Diósgyőr	1–2	Puskás Akadémia	Miskolc
14:30 CEST	Vallejo 19'; Esiti (yellow card) 66'; Sentić (yellow card) 76'	Report	Lukács (yellow card) 13' (goal) 85'; Zs. Nagy 90+3' (pen.)	Stadium: Diósgyőri Stadion; Attendance: 3,105; Referee: Péter Antal; Assistant referees: Péter Kóbor, Bence Belicza
Note: • Puskás Akadémia: Szappanos — Orján, Golla, Markgráf, Zs. Nagy (c) — L. Duarte, Magyar (Soisalo (substituted on) 63') — P. Dárdai (Mondovics (substituted on) 74'), Lukács, Semel (Nissilä (substituted on) 84') — A. Németh (Fameyeh (substituted on) 74') • Manager: Hornyák • Player of the match: Ante Roguljić, Diósgyőr 7.8 • Best player of Puskás Akadémia: Ákos Markgráf 7.5

10 April 2026 29	Puskás Akadémia	1–4	Győr	Felcsút
17:45 CEST	Maceiras (yellow card) 71'; Magyar 90+2'	Report	Vitális 16'; Csinger 50'; Benbouali 67'; Njie 69'; R. Tóth (yellow card) 86'	Stadium: Pancho Aréna; Attendance: 2,685; Referee: Mihály Káprály; Assistant referees: Norbert Bornemissza, Péter Garai
Note: • Puskás Akadémia: Szappanos — Orján, Golla (c), Markgráf, Maceiras — L. Duarte (Okeke (substituted on) 74'), Nissilä (Magyar (substituted on) 59') — Soisalo (Mondovics (substituted on) 55'), Lukács, Semel (Szolnoki (substituted on) 74') — A. Németh (Fameyeh (substituted on) 59') • Manager: Hornyák • Player of the match: Ante Roguljić, Győri ETO 8.4 • Best player of Puskás Akadémia: Zsolt Magyar 7.4

14 April 2026 26	Ferencváros	2–1	Puskás Akadémia	Budapest
18:45 CEST	Joseph 42'; Kanichowsky 45'; Gómez (yellow card) 75'	Report	L. Duarte (yellow card) 13'; Lukács 34'; Maceiras (yellow card) 47'; Szolnoki (yellow card) 74'	Stadium: Ferencváros Stadion; Attendance: 7,155; Referee: Márton Rúsz; Assistant referees: Péter Kóbor, Ákos Berényi
Note: • Puskás Akadémia: Szappanos — Maceiras, Arutyunyan, Golla (Orján (substituted on) 83'), Markgráf — L. Duarte (Magyar (substituted on) 83') — Lukács, Okeke (Mondovics (substituted on) 80'), Szolnoki (c), Zs. Nagy — A. Németh (Fameyeh (substituted on) 72') • Manager: Hornyák • Player of the match: Gabi Kanichowsky, Ferencváros 8.5 • Best player of Puskás Akadémia: Péter Szappanos 7.6

19 April 2026 30	Paks	1–0	Puskás Akadémia	Paks
14:15 CEST	Hahn (penalty missed) 15'; Papp (yellow card) 31'; Böde 34' (yellow card) 63'; Bévárdi (yellow card) 37'; J. Szabó (red card) 62'	Report	Okeke (yellow card) 23'; Golla (yellow card) 29'; Magyar (yellow card) 65'	Stadium: Fehérvári úti Stadion; Attendance: 3,110; Referee: Ferenc Karakó; Assistant referees: István Albert, Bence Belicza
Note: • Puskás Akadémia: Szappanos — Maceiras (Fameyeh (substituted on) 77'), Arutyunyan, Golla, Markgráf — Szolnoki (c) (Semel (substituted on) 88') – L. Duarte, Okeke (Magyar (substituted on) 57'), Zs. Nagy — Lukács, A. Németh (Mondovics (substituted on) 46') • Manager: Hornyák • Player of the match: Gábor Vas, Paks 7.6 • Best player of Puskás Akadémia: Georgy Arutyunyan 7.2

25 April 2026 31	Puskás Akadémia	2–0	Újpest	Felcsút
17:00 CEST	Markgráf 12'; Zs. Nagy (yellow card) 35'; Szolnoki 55'	Report	Fiola (yellow card) 50'	Stadium: Pancho Aréna; Attendance: 2,500; Referee: Balázs Berke; Assistant referees: Péter Ország, Viktor Nagy
Note: • Puskás Akadémia: Szappanos — Maceiras (Orján (substituted on) 88'), Arutyunyan, Szolnoki (c), Markgráf, Zs. Nagy — L. Duarte (Kern (substituted on) 90+2'), Okeke, Semel (Magyar (substituted on) 78') — Lukács, A. Németh (Soisalo (substituted on) 78') • Manager: Hornyák • Player of the match: Ákos Markgráf, Puskás Akadémia 8.1 • Best player of Újpest: Dávid Dombó 8.0

1 May 2026 32	Zalaegerszeg	1–3	Puskás Akadémia	Zalaegerszeg
20:00 CEST	Csonka 7'; Maxsuell (yellow card) 37'; López (yellow card) 65'	Report	L. Duarte (yellow card) 11'; A. Németh 15' (yellow card) 25'; Lukács 27'; Okeke (yellow card) 33'; Zs. Nagy 79'; Markgráf (yellow card) 89'	Stadium: ZTE Arena; Attendance: 4,732; Referee: Péter Zierkelbach; Assistant referees: Zoltán Horváth, Viktor Nagy

16 May 2026 33	Puskás Akadémia	2–2	MTK	Felcsút
20:00 CEST	Kern (yellow card) 29'; Okeke (yellow card) 69'; Fameyeh 80'; Szolnoki (yellow card) 90+1'; Lukács 90+5' (pen.)	Report	Zeljković (yellow card) 41'; Kádár (yellow card) 50'; Á. Molnár 59'; Kerezsi 82'	Stadium: Pancho Aréna; Attendance: 1,117; Referee: Ferenc Karakó; Assistant referees: Balázs Huszár, Viktor Nagy

Note: Round 1, Kazincbarcika vs Puskás Akadémia match: Puskás Akadémia FC, interested in the UEFA Conference League qualifiers, officially requested the exchange of the right to choose the venue for the Kazincbarcika–Puskás Akadémia match to be held in the 1st round of the Fizz League (Nemzeti Bajnokság I).
Note: Round 26, Ferencváros vs Puskás Akadémia match: the joint request of the two clubs was accepted by the MLSZ Competition Committee, so the Fizz League meeting originally scheduled for 16 March will be held at a new date to be determined later.
Source: Puskás Akadémia FC Schedule – MLSZ Adatbank

=== Magyar Kupa ===
==== Round of 64 ====
13 September 2025 R64	Vasas (NB II)	4–1	Puskás Akadémia	Budapest
19:00 CEST	Cseke (yellow card) 20'; Pethő 37' (yellow card) 68'; M. Tóth 49' (pen.); Otigba 65'; Pávkovics 82'	Report	Maceiras (yellow card) 51'; Favorov 57' (yellow card) 66'; A. Németh (yellow card) 85'	Stadium: Illovszky Rudolf Stadion; Attendance: 1,997; Referee: Bence Csonka dr. Assistant referees: Péter Kóbor, Balázs Szert
Note: • Puskás Akadémia: Szappanos — Maceiras (Z. Nagy (substituted on) 83'), Golla, Stronati, Ormonde-Ottewill — Favorov, Duarte (Nissilä (substituted on) 76') — Soisalo (P. Dárdai (substituted on) 57'), Lukács, Zs. Nagy (c) — Colley (A. Németh (substituted on) 57') • Manager: Hornyák

=== UEFA Conference League ===
The Puskás Akadméia FC will participate in the competition as the 2nd place in the previous Nemzeti Bajnokság I (domestic league) season.

==== Second qualifying round ====
The draw for the second qualifying round was held on 18 June 2025.

24 July 2025 First leg	Aris Limassol (Cyprus)	3–2	Puskás Akadémia	Kolossi, Cyprus
18:00 (19:00 EEST (UTC+3))	Montnor 6'; Kvilitaia 16' (pen.); Yago (yellow card) 45'; Moucketou-Moussounda (yellow card) 57'; Edi Semedo 87'; Charalampous (yellow card) 90+2'	Report	Stronati (yellow card) 30'; Markgráf (yellow card) 66'; Arutyunyan (yellow card) 72'; Colley 78', 81'	Stadium: Alphamega Stadium; Attendance: 1,620; Referee: David Šmajc (Slovenia); Assistant referees: David Gabrovec, Tomaž Cerne
Note: • Puskás Akadémia: Markek — Maceiras, Golla, Stronati, Zs. Nagy (c) — Arutyunyan (Semel (substituted on) 73'), Nissilä (Favorov (substituted on) 65') — Duarte — Soisalo, A. Németh (Colley (substituted on) 46'), P. Dárdai (Markgráf (substituted on) 46') • Manager: Hornyák • Best player of the match: Lamin Colley, Puskás Akadémia 9.2

31 July 2025 Second leg	Puskás Akadémia	0–2 (2–5 agg.)	(Cyprus) Aris Limassol	Felcsút
20:00 CEST	Colley (yellow card) 19' (yellow-red card) 63'; Maceiras (yellow card) 24'; Duarte (yellow card) 63'	Report	Yago (yellow card) 55'; Kvilitaia 77'; Kakoullis 78'	Stadium: Pancho Aréna; Attendance: 1,986; Referee: Robertas Valikonis (Lithuania); Assistant referees: Vytenis Kazlauskas, Benas Kikutis
Note: • Puskás Akadémia: Markek — Maceiras, Golla, Stronati, Arutyunyan (Markgráf (substituted on) 74') — Favorov, Duarte (A. Németh (substituted on) 74'), P. Dárdai (Semel (substituted on) 59') — Soisalo (Kerezsi (substituted on) 74'), Colley, Zs. Nagy (c) • Manager: Hornyák • Best player of the match: Andronikos Kakoullis, Aris Limassol 8.3 • Best player of Puskás Akadémia: Artem Favorov and Wojciech Golla 7.6 each

Aris Limassol won 5–2 on aggregate.

== See also ==
- List of Puskás Akadémia FC seasons
