= 2021–22 Fehérvár FC season =

Fehérvár
2021–22 season
- Owner: István Garancsi
- Head coach: Imre Szabics (until 16 February 2022); Michael Boris
- Stadium: MOL Aréna Sóstó
- Nemzeti Bajnokság I: 4th
- Magyar Kupa: Quarter-final
- UEFA Europa Conference League: First qualifying round
- Top goalscorer: League: Kenan Kodro (15); All: Kenan Kodro (16)
Home colours	Away colours	Third colours
- All statistics correct as of 27 November 2021.

The 2021–22 Fehérvár FC season is the club's 81st season in existence and the 23rd consecutive season in the top flight of Hungarian football. In addition to the domestic league, Fehérvár are participating in this season's editions of the Hungarian Cup and the inaugural UEFA Conference League.

== Squad ==
As of match played 15 May 2022

No.	Name	Nationality	Position	Date of birth (age)	Signed from	Signed in	Apps.	Goals
Goalkeepers
1	Dániel Kovács	(Hungary)	GK	16 January 1994 (aged 28)	Soroksár	2019	40	0
57	Martin Dala	(Hungary)	GK	26 April 2004 (aged 18)	youth sector	2022	0	0
74	Ádám Kovácsik	(Hungary)	GK	4 April 1991 (aged 31)	Reggina	2015	143	0
Defenders
4	Adrian Rus	(Romania)	DF	18 March 1996 (aged 26)	Puskás Akadémia	2019	57	1
5	Attila Fiola	(Hungary)	DF	17 February 1990 (aged 32)	Puskás Akadémia	2016	132	1
11	Loïc Négo	(Hungary)	DF	15 January 1991 (aged 31)	Chartlon Athletic	2015	206	30
22	Stopira	(Cape Verde)	DF	20 May 1988 (aged 33)	Feirense	2012	240	20
26	Michael Lüftner	(Czech Republic)	DF	14 March 1994 (aged 28)	Copenhagen	2021	9	0
33	Barnabás Bese	(Hungary)	DF	6 May 1994 (aged 28)	Leuven	2022	9	0
55	Marcel Heister	(Germany)	DF	29 July 1992 (aged 29)	Ferencváros	2021	25	1
65	Szilveszter Hangya	(Hungary)	DF	2 January 1994 (aged 28)	Vasas	2018	64	1
Midfielders
8	Yevhenii Makarenko	(Ukraine)	MF	21 May 1991 (aged 30)	Anderlecht	2021	29	0
10	István Kovács	(Hungary)	MF	27 March 1992 (aged 30)	Szombathelyi Haladás	2012	218	21
13	Artem Shabanov	(Ukraine)	MF	7 March 1992 (aged 30)	Dynamo Kyiv	2022	11	0
14	Norbert Szendrei	(Hungary)	MF	27 March 2000 (aged 22)	Budapest Honvéd	2021	17	0
21	Rúben Pinto	(Portugal)	MF	24 April 1992 (aged 30)	CSKA Sofia	2020	27	0
44	Peter Žulj	(Austria)	MF	9 June 1993 (aged 28)	İstanbul Başakşehir	2022	13	3
80	Bohdan Lyednyev	(Ukraine)	MF	7 April 1998 (aged 24)	Dynamo Kyiv	2022	8	0
95	Alef	(Brazil)	MF	28 January 1995 (aged 27)	Braga	2020	35	2
Forwards
7	Ivan Petryak	(Ukraine)	FW	13 March 1994 (aged 28)	Shakhtar Donetsk	2019	93	24
15	Armin Hodžić	(Bosnia and Herzegovina)	FW	17 November 1994 (aged 27)	Dinamo Zagreb	2018	57	15
17	Nemanja Nikolić	(Hungary)	FW	31 December 1987 (aged 34)	Chicago Fire	2020	224	117
20	Evandro	(Brazil)	FW	14 January 1997 (aged 25)	CSKA Sofia	2020	8	1
23	Palkó Dárdai	(Hungary)	FW	24 April 1999 (aged 23)	Hertha BSC II	2021	46	7
30	Lamin Jallow	(The Gambia)	FW	22 July 1994 (aged 27)	Vicenza	2022	7	0
49	Krisztián Géresi	(Hungary)	FW	14 June 1994 (aged 27)	youth sector	2015	63	9
70	Funsho Bamgboye	(Nigeria)	FW	9 January 1999 (aged 23)	Szombathelyi Haladás	2019	67	10
Players away on loan
9	Budu Zivzivadze	(Georgia (country))	FW	10 March 1994 (aged 28)	Mezőkövesd	2020	43	11
27	Levente Szabó	(Hungary)	FW	6 June 1999 (aged 22)	youth sector	2020	20	1
29	Zsolt Kojnok	(Hungary)	DF	15 February 2001 (aged 21)	youth sector	2021	3	0
35	Bence Gundel-Takács	(Hungary)	GK	6 April 1998 (aged 24)	Újpest	2019	0	0
42	Emil Rockov	(Serbia)	GK	27 January 1995 (aged 27)	Vojvodina	2020	18	0
77	Kevin Csoboth	(Hungary)	FW	20 June 2000 (aged 21)	Benfica B	2021	1	0
96	Lyes Houri	(France)	MF	19 January 1996 (aged 26)	Viitorul Constanța	2020	49	5
99	Dániel Zsóri	(Hungary)	FW	14 October 2000 (aged 21)	Debrecen	2019	5	0
Players who left during the season
6	Visar Musliu	(North Macedonia)	DF	13 November 1994 (aged 27)	Shkëndija Tetovo	2019	60	2
8	Samy Bourard	(Belgium)	MF	29 March 1996 (aged 26)	ADO Den Haag	2021	5	0
24	Patrik Nyári	(Hungary)	MF	9 April 2001 (aged 21)	Szombathelyi Haladás	2019	5	0
83	Olivér Tamás	(Hungary)	DF	14 April 2001 (aged 21)	youth sector	2020	1	0

== Transfers ==
=== Summer ===
In: Note: Flags indicate national team as defined under FIFA eligibility rules; some limited exceptions apply. Players may hold more than one non-FIFA nationality.

No.	Pos.	Nation	Player
8	MF	UKR	Yevhenii Makarenko (from (Belgium) Anderlecht)
14	MF	HUN	Norbert Szendrei (from Budapest Honvéd)
15	FW	BIH	Armin Hodžić (loan return from (Turkey) Kasımpaşa)
19	FW	BIH	Kenan Kodro (from (Spain) Athletic Bilbao)
26	DF	CZE	Michael Lüftner (from (Denmark) Copenhagen)
29	DF	HUN	Zsolt Kojnok (from Fehérvár II)
30	FW	GAM	Lamin Jallow (from (Italy) Vicenza)
35	GK	HUN	Bence Gundel-Takács (loan return from Győr)
44	DF	HUN	Márió Zeke (loan return from Budafok)
55	DF	GER	Marcel Heister (from Ferencváros)
77	FW	HUN	Kevin Csoboth (from (Portugal) Benfica B)
83	DF	HUN	Olivér Tamás (loan return from Paks)
99	FW	HUN	Dániel Zsóri (loan return from Budafok)

Out: Note: Flags indicate national team as defined under FIFA eligibility rules; some limited exceptions apply. Players may hold more than one non-FIFA nationality.

No.	Pos.	Nation	Player
8	MF	BEL	Samy Bourard (to (Netherlands) Den Haag)
20	FW	BRA	Evandro (loan to (Serbia) Proleter Novi Sad)
27	FW	HUN	Levente Szabó (loan to Budafok)
44	DF	HUN	Márió Zeke (loan to Gyirmót)
68	MF	HUN	Ádám Halmai (loan to Budaörs)
77	DF	HUN	Bendegúz Bolla (to (England) Wolverhampron Wanderers)
83	DF	HUN	Olivér Tamás (to Paks)
88	FW	HUN	Marcell Papp (loan to Budafok)
96	MF	FRA	Lyes Houri (loan to (Romania) Universitatea Craiova)
97	GK	ROU	Árpád Tordai (loan return to (Romania) Viitorul Constanța)

=== Winter ===
In: Note: Flags indicate national team as defined under FIFA eligibility rules; some limited exceptions apply. Players may hold more than one non-FIFA nationality.

No.	Pos.	Nation	Player
13	MF	UKR	Artem Shabanov (from (Ukraine) Dynamo Kyiv)
20	FW	BRA	Evandro (loan return from (Serbia) Proleter Novi Sad)
44	MF	AUT	Peter Žulj (loan from (Turkey) İstanbul Başakşehir)
49	FW	HUN	Krisztián Géresi (loan return from Puskás Akadémia)
68	MF	HUN	Ádám Halmai (loan return from Budaörs)
80	MF	UKR	Bohdan Lyednyev (loan from (Ukraine) Dynamo Kyiv)
—	MF	HUN	Barnabás Horváth (from Fehérvár U-19)

Out: Note: Flags indicate national team as defined under FIFA eligibility rules; some limited exceptions apply. Players may hold more than one non-FIFA nationality.

No.	Pos.	Nation	Player
6	DF	MKD	Visar Musliu ( (Germany) to Ingolstadt 04)
9	FW	GEO	Budu Zivzivadze (loan to Újpest)
24	MF	HUN	Patrik Nyári (to Paks)
29	DF	HUN	Zsolt Kojnok (loan to Budaörs)
35	GK	HUN	Bence Gundel-Takács (loan to (Croatia) Jarun Zagreb)
42	GK	SRB	Emil Rockov (loan to (Serbia) Vojvodina)
68	MF	HUN	Ádám Halmai (loan to Zalaegerszeg)
77	FW	HUN	Kevin Csoboth (loan to Szeged)
99	FW	HUN	Dániel Zsóri (loan to Zalaegerszeg)

== Competitions ==
=== Overview ===
Competition	First match	Last match	Starting round	Final position	Record							
Competition	First match	Last match	Starting round	Final position	Pld	W	D	L	GF	GA	GD	Win %
Nemzeti Bajnokság I	1 August 2021	14 May 2022	Matchday 1	4th	33	13	9	11	48	43	+5	39.39
Hungarian Cup	18 September 2021	3 March 2022	Round of 64	Quarter-final	4	3	0	1	15	6	+9	75.00
UEFA Conference League	8 July 2021	15 July 2021	First qualifying round	First qualifying round	2	0	1	1	1	3	−2	0.00
Total					39	16	10	13	64	52	+12	41.03

Last updated: 15 May 2022
Source: Competitions

=== Nemzeti Bajnokság I ===
==== League table ====
Pos	Team	Pld	W	D	L	GF	GA	GD	Pts	Qualification or relegation
2	Kisvárda	33	16	11	6	50	34	+16	59	Qualification for the Europa Conference League second qualifying round (Note: Since the winners of the 2021–22 Magyar Kupa, Ferencváros, qualified for the Champions League, the Europa Conference League berth awarded to the Magyar Kupa winners was transferred to the highest-placed Nemzeti Bajnokság I team not already qualified for European competition, the fourth-placed team.)
3	Puskás Akadémia	33	14	12	7	43	34	+9	54	Qualification for the Europa Conference League second qualifying round
4	Fehérvár	33	13	9	11	48	43	+5	48	Qualification for the Europa Conference League second qualifying round
5	Újpest	33	12	8	13	50	48	+2	44	
6	Paks	33	12	7	14	75	63	+12	43	

Source: Hungarian Football Federation (in Hungarian), Soccerway
Rules for classification: 1) Points; 2) Matches won; 3) Goal difference; 4) Goals scored; 5) Head-to-head points; 6) Head-to-head goal difference; 7) Head-to-head away goals scored; 8) Fair play ranking; 9) Drawing of lots.

==== Results summary ====
Overall								Home						Away					
Pld	W	D	L	GF	GA	GD	Pts	W	D	L	GF	GA	GD	W	D	L	GF	GA	GD
33	13	9	11	48	43	+5	48	9	3	4	28	20	+8	4	6	7	20	23	−3

Last updated: 15 May 2022.
Source: Soccerway

==== Results by round ====
Round	1	2	3	4	5	6	7	8	9	10	11	12	13	14	15	16	17	18	19	20	21	22	23	24	25	26	27	28	29	30	31	32	33
Ground	A	H	A	H	H	A	H	A	H	A	H	H	A	H	A	A	H	A	H	A	H	A	A	H	A	H	A	A	H	A	H	A	H
Result	D	L	D	W	W	D	D	D	W	L	W	W	L	W	L	W	W	L	L	L	L	L	L	L	W	W	D	W	D	W	W	D	D
Position	6	11	10	7	4	5	7	6	4	7	4	4	4	4	4	4	4	4	4	4	4	6	6	7	6	6	6	5	5	4	4	4	4

Updated to match(es) played on 15 May 2022. Source: Matches
A = Away; H = Home; W = Win; D = Draw; L = Loss

==== Matches ====
1 August 2021 1	Zalaegerszeg	1–1	Fehérvár	Zalaegerszeg
17:45 CEST	Babati 68'	Report	Dárdai 47'	Stadium: ZTE Arena; Attendance: 1,965; Referee: Sándor Andó-Szabó

22 September 2021 2	Fehérvár	0–1	Ferencváros	Székesfehérvár
19:00 CEST		Report	R. Mmaee 83'	Stadium: MOL Aréna Sóstó; Attendance: 6,006; Referee: Ferenc Karakó

14 August 2021 3	Gyirmót	1–1	Fehérvár	Győr
20:30 CEST	Varga 62'	Report	Petryak 30'	Stadium: Ménfői úti Stadion; Attendance: 1,822; Referee: Ferenc Karakó

21 August 2021 4	Fehérvár	2–1	Kisvárda	Székesfehérvár
18:15 CEST	Zivzivadze 44'; Dárdai 76'	Report	Mešanović 90+1'	Stadium: MOL Aréna Sóstó; Attendance: 2,429; Referee: Balázs Berke

28 August 2021 5	Fehérvár	2–1	MTK Budapest	Székesfehérvár
20:30 CEST	Kodro 73' (pen.), 79'	Report	Grozav 45'	Stadium: MOL Aréna Sóstó; Attendance: 2,146; Referee: Csaba Pintér

11 September 2021 6	Mezőkövesd	2–2	Fehérvár	Mezőkövesd
20:00 CEST	Nagy 39'; Jurina 90+4'	Report	Nikolić 70'; Heister 81'	Stadium: Városi Stadion; Attendance: 1,498; Referee: Tamás Bognár

25 September 2021 7	Fehérvár	0–0	Puskás Akadémia	Székesfehérvár
19:30 CEST		Report		Stadium: MOL Aréna Sóstó; Attendance: 2,014; Referee: Péter Solymosi

2 October 2021 8	Debrecen	1–1	Fehérvár	Debrecen
19:30 CEST	Ugrai 86'	Report	Kodro 90+2'	Stadium: Nagyerdei Stadion; Attendance: 4,054; Referee: István Vad

16 October 2021 9	Fehérvár	2–1	Budapest Honvéd	Székesfehérvár
19:30 CEST	Zivzivadze 26'; Petryak 55'	Report	Batik 60'	Stadium: MOL Aréna Sóstó; Attendance: 2,914; Referee: Balázs Berke

22 October 2021 10	Újpest	1–0	Fehérvár	Budapest
20:00 CEST	Csongvai 50'	Report		Stadium: Szusza Ferenc Stadion; Attendance: 1,508; Referee: Sándor Andó-Szabó

29 October 2021 11	Fehérvár	2–1	Paks	Székesfehérvár
19:45 CEST	Petryak 16'; Kodro 84'	Report	Ádám 69'	Stadium: MOL Aréna Sóstó; Attendance: 1,905; Referee: Ádám Farkas

7 November 2021 12	Fehérvár	3–0	Zalaegerszeg	Székesfehérvár
17:30 CET	Kodro 17'; Petryak 37'; Dárdai 54'	Report		Stadium: MOL Aréna Sóstó; Attendance: 2,174; Referee: Gergő Bogár

21 November 2021 13	Ferencváros	3–0	Fehérvár	Budapest
17:30 CET	Zubkov 10'; R. Mmaee 40'; Uzuni 58'	Report		Stadium: Groupama Arena; Attendance: 8,719; Referee: Balázs Berke

27 November 2021 14	Fehérvár	3–2	Gyirmót	Székesfehérvár
17:00 CET	Nikolić 10' (pen.); Kodro 49' (pen.), 84'	Report	Varga 38' (pen.), 90+3'	Stadium: MOL Aréna Sóstó; Attendance: 1,206; Referee: Ádám Farkas

5 December 2021 15	Kisvárda	2–1	Fehérvár	Kisvárda
13:30 CET	Ćirković 4'; Asani 22'	Report	Nikolić 27'	Stadium: Várkerti Stadion; Attendance: 1,521; Referee: Péter Solymosi

11 December 2021 16	MTK Budapest	0–2	Fehérvár	Budapest
19:30 CET		Report	Kodro 21'; Petryak 90+4'	Stadium: Hidegkuti Nándor Stadion; Attendance: 1,000; Referee: Tamás Bognár

18 December 2021 17	Fehérvár	1–0	Mezőkövesd	Székesfehérvár
19:30 CET	Kodro 42'	Report		Stadium: MOL Aréna Sóstó; Attendance: 1,276; Referee: Ferenc Karakó

30 January 2022 18	Puskás Akadémia	1–0	Fehérvár	Felcsút
13:00 CET	Favorov 67'	Report		Stadium: Pancho Aréna; Attendance: 1,520; Referee: István Vad

5 February 2022 19	Fehérvár	1–2	Debrecen	Székesfehérvár
19:30 CET	Alef 42'	Report	Szécsi 45', 87'	Stadium: MOL Aréna Sóstó; Attendance: 2,065; Referee: Gergő Bogár

13 February 2022 20	Budapest Honvéd	3–1	Fehérvár	Budapest
14:15 CET	D. Nagy 55', 90+1'; Petrusenko 86'	Report	Žulj 49'	Stadium: Bozsik Aréna; Attendance: 3,162; Referee: Sándor Andó-Szabó

20 February 2022 21	Fehérvár	1–2	Újpest	Székesfehérvár
17:45 CET	Nikolić 87'	Report	Croizet 46'; Zivzivadze 74'	Stadium: MOL Aréna Sóstó; Attendance: 3,228; Referee: Tamás Bognár

25 February 2022 22	Paks	3–2	Fehérvár	Paks
20:00 CET	Haraszti 19'; Ádám 84'; Lenzsér 90+4'	Report	Žulj 3'; Dárdai 13'	Stadium: Fehérvári úti Stadion; Attendance: 1,871; Referee: Gergő Bogár

6 March 2022 23	Zalaegerszeg	2–0	Fehérvár	Zalaegerszeg
15:15 CET	Huszti 12'; Koszta 83' (pen.)	Report		Stadium: ZTE Arena; Attendance: 2,056; Referee: Bence Csonka

13 March 2022 24	Fehérvár	0–2	Ferencváros	Székesfehérvár
17:00 CET		Report	R. Mmaee 68', 90+1'	Stadium: MOL Aréna Sóstó; Attendance: 6,989; Referee: Tamás Bognár

19 March 2022 25	Gyirmót	0–2	Fehérvár	Győr
17:30 CET		Report	Nikolić 2', 30'	Stadium: Ménfői úti Stadion; Attendance: 1,844; Referee: Ferenc Karakó

2 April 2022 26	Fehérvár	5–3	Kisvárda	Székesfehérvár
17:00 CEST	Nikolić 15', 85' (pen.); Bamgboye 18'; Žulj 59'; Kodro 80'	Report	Bumba 8'; Navrátil 10'; Camaj 12'; Kravchenko (yellow card) 68' (yellow-red card) 84'	Stadium: MOL Aréna Sóstó; Attendance: 2,054; Referee: József Erdős

10 April 2022 27	MTK Budapest	1–1	Fehérvár	Budapest
17:00 CEST	Mezei 51'	Report	Fiola (red card) 79'; Négo 84'	Stadium: Hidegkuti Nándor Stadion; Attendance: 2,256; Referee: Gergő Bogár

17 April 2022 28	Mezőkövesd	1–2	Fehérvár	Mezőkövesd
14:30 CEST	Dražić 48'	Report	Kodro 17'; Petryak 77'	Stadium: Városi Stadion; Attendance: 1,287; Referee: Ferenc Karakó

23 April 2022 29	Fehérvár	2–2	Puskás Akadémia	Székesfehérvár
20:00 CEST	Kodro 3'; Stopira 90+5'	Report	Zahedi 25', 53'; Băluță (yellow card) 5' (yellow-red card) 90+1'	Stadium: MOL Aréna Sóstó; Attendance: 3,103; Referee: Tamás Bognár

30 April 2022 30	Debrecen	0–3	Fehérvár	Debrecen
19:30 CEST		Report	Nikolić 9'; Kodro 34'; Négo 79'	Stadium: Nagyerdei Stadion; Attendance: 3,604; Referee: István Vad

3 May 2022 31	Fehérvár	2–0	Budapest Honvéd	Székesfehérvár
18:30 CEST	Dárdai 25'; Kodro 46'	Report		Stadium: MOL Aréna Sóstó; Attendance: 2,527; Referee: Balázs Berke

8 May 2022 32	Újpest	1–1	Fehérvár	Budapest
18:45 CEST	Croizet 15'	Report	Nikolić 63'	Stadium: Szusza Ferenc Stadion; Attendance: 3,331; Referee: Sándor Andó-Szabó

14 May 2022 33	Fehérvár	2–2	Paks	Székesfehérvár
18:30 CEST (UTC+2)	Kodro 24'; Shabanov (yellow card) 49'; Osváth 67' (o.g.)	Report	Gyurkits 16'; Ádám (yellow card) 30'; J. Szabó 48'	Stadium: MOL Aréna Sóstó; Attendance: 4,224; Referee: Balázs Berke

=== Hungarian Cup ===
18 September 2021 Round of 64	Sopron	2–6	Fehérvár	Sopron
18:00 CEST	Krizsonits 33'; Kustor 51' (pen.)	Report	Nikolić 9' (pen.); Jallow 14', 39'; Dárdai 19'; Csoboth 24', 80'	Stadium: Káposztás utcai Stadion; Attendance: 1,300; Referee: Ádám Pillók

3 November 2021 Round of 32	BVSC Budapest	2–5	Fehérvár	Budapest
12:30 CET	Szalánszki 80'; Fisli 90+1'	Report	Nikolić 3', 38', 63'; Dárdai 29'; Kodro 69'	Stadium: Szőnyi úti Stadion; Attendance: 300; Referee: Péter Zierkelbach

8 February 2022 Round of 16	Szeged	0–3	Fehérvár	Szeged
20:00 CET		Report	Négo 14'; Petryak 16'; Kővári 53' (o.g.)	Stadium: Szent Gellért Fórum; Attendance: 1,939; Referee: Gergely Szőts

3 March 2022 Quarter-final	Győr	2–1	Fehérvár	Győr
20:00 CET	Kiss 71'; Farkas 90+3' (pen.)	Report	Petryak 43'; Fiola (yellow card) 58' (yellow-red card) 72'	Stadium: ETO Park; Attendance: 1,700; Referee: Péter Zierkelbach

=== UEFA Conference League ===
==== First qualifying round ====
8 July 2021 First leg	Fehérvár (Hungary)	1–1	(Armenia) Ararat Yerevan	MOL Aréna Sóstó, Székesfehérvár
20:00	Heister 84'	Report	Pobulić 90+3'	Attendance: 2,846; Referee: (Moldova) Ion Orlic

15 July 2021 Second leg	Ararat Yerevan (Armenia)	2–0 (3–1 agg.)	(Hungary) Fehérvár	Gyumri City Stadium, Gyumri
15:00	Pobulić 33'; Silue 85'	Report		Attendance: 1,500; Referee: (Croatia) Igor Pajac

=== Appearances and goals ===
Last updated on 15 May 2022.

No.	Pos	Nat	Player	Total		OTP Bank Liga		Conference League		Hungarian Cup	
No.	Pos	Nat	Player	Apps	Goals	Apps	Goals	Apps	Goals	Apps	Goals
1	GK	(Hungary) HUN	Dániel Kovács	30	-39	27	-35	0	-0	3	-4
4	DF	(Romania) ROU	Adrian Rus	28	0	26	0	0	0	2	0
5	DF	(Hungary) HUN	Attila Fiola	30	0	26	0	1	0	3	0
7	FW	(Ukraine) UKR	Ivan Petryak	31	8	27	6	2	0	2	2
8	MF	(Ukraine) UKR	Yevhenii Makarenko	33	0	29	0	0	0	4	0
10	MF	(Hungary) HUN	István Kovács	9	0	7	0	1	0	1	0
11	DF	(Hungary) HUN	Loïc Négo	36	3	30	2	2	0	4	1
13	MF	(Ukraine) UKR	Artem Shabanov	11	0	11	0	0	0	0	0
14	MF	(Hungary) HUN	Norbert Szendrei	19	0	17	0	0	0	2	0
15	FW	(Bosnia and Herzegovina) BIH	Armin Hodžić	1	0	0	0	0	0	1	0
17	FW	(Hungary) HUN	Nemanja Nikolić	36	14	30	10	2	0	4	4
19	FW	(Bosnia and Herzegovina) BIH	Kenan Kodro	30	16	27	15	0	0	3	1
20	FW	(Brazil) BRA	Evandro	2	0	1	0	0	0	1	0
21	MF	(Portugal) POR	Rúben Pinto	11	0	9	0	0	0	2	0
22	DF	(Cape Verde) CPV	Stopira	30	1	26	1	2	0	2	0
23	FW	(Hungary) HUN	Palkó Dárdai	38	7	32	5	2	0	4	2
26	DF	(Czech Republic) CZE	Michael Lüftner	13	0	9	0	2	0	2	0
30	FW	(The Gambia) GAM	Lamin Jallow	8	2	7	0	0	0	1	2
33	DF	(Hungary) HUN	Barnabás Bese	10	0	9	0	0	0	1	0
44	MF	(Austria) AUT	Peter Žulj	14	3	13	3	0	0	1	0
49	FW	(Hungary) HUN	Krisztián Géresi	2	0	2	0	0	0	0	0
55	DF	(Germany) GER	Marcel Heister	29	2	25	1	2	1	2	0
65	DF	(Hungary) HUN	Szilveszter Hangya	15	0	13	0	0	0	2	0
70	FW	(Nigeria) NGR	Funsho Bamgboye	24	1	20	1	2	0	2	0
74	GK	(Hungary) HUN	Ádám Kovácsik	9	-13	6	-8	2	-3	1	-2
80	MF	(Ukraine) UKR	Bohdan Lyednyev	10	0	8	0	0	0	2	0
95	MF	(Brazil) BRA	Alef	17	0	13	0	2	0	2	0
Youth players:
13	FW	(Hungary) HUN	Tamás Tóth	0	0	0	0	0	0	0	0
18	MF	(Slovakia) SVK	Bence Kovács	1	0	0	0	0	0	1	0
57	GK	(Hungary) HUN	Martin Dala	0	0	0	-0	0	-0	0	-0
85	MF	(Hungary) HUN	Olivér Dinnyés	0	0	0	0	0	0	0	0
91	DF	(Hungary) HUN	Péter Fodor	0	0	0	0	0	0	0	0
99	DF	(Hungary) HUN	Milán Papp	0	0	0	0	0	0	0	0
Out to loan:
9	FW	(Georgia (country)) GEO	Budu Zivzivadze	15	2	12	2	2	0	1	0
27	FW	(Hungary) HUN	Levente Szabó	5	0	4	0	1	0	0	0
29	DF	(Hungary) HUN	Zsolt Kojnok	5	0	3	0	0	0	2	0
35	GK	(Hungary) HUN	Bence Gundel-Takács	0	0	0	-0	0	-0	0	-0
77	FW	(Hungary) HUN	Kevin Csoboth	3	2	1	0	0	0	2	2
96	MF	(France) FRA	Lyes Houri	2	0	0	0	2	0	0	0
Players no longer at the club:
6	DF	(North Macedonia) MKD	Visar Musliu	10	0	8	0	1	0	1	0
8	MF	(Belgium) BEL	Samy Bourard	0	0	0	0	0	0	0	0
24	MF	(Hungary) HUN	Patrik Nyári	2	0	0	0	0	0	2	0
77	DF	(Hungary) HUN	Bendegúz Bolla	1	0	0	0	1	0	0	0
83	DF	(Hungary) HUN	Olivér Tamás	0	0	0	0	0	0	0	0

=== Top scorers ===
Includes all competitive matches. The list is sorted by shirt number when total goals are equal.

Last updated on 15 May 2022

Position	Nation	Number	Name	OTP Bank Liga	UEFA Conference League	Hungarian Cup	Total
1	(Bosnia and Herzegovina)	19	Kenan Kodro	15	0	1	16
2	(Hungary)	17	Nemanja Nikolić	10	0	4	14
3	(Ukraine)	7	Ivan Petryak	6	0	2	8
4	(Hungary)	23	Palkó Dárdai	5	0	2	7
5	(Austria)	44	Peter Žulj	3	0	0	3
5	(Hungary)	11	Loïc Négo	2	0	1	3
7	(Hungary)	77	Kevin Csoboth	0	0	2	2
7	(Germany)	55	Marcel Heister	1	1	0	2
7	(The Gambia)	30	Lamin Jallow	0	0	2	2
7	(Georgia (country))	9	Budu Zivzivadze	2	0	0	2
11	(Brazil)	95	Alef	1	0	0	1
11	(Nigeria)	70	Funsho Bamgboye	1	0	0	1
11	(Cape Verde)	22	Stopira	1	0	0	1
/	/	/	Own Goals	1	0	1	2
			TOTALS	48	1	13	63

=== Disciplinary record ===
Includes all competitive matches. Players with 1 card or more included only.

Last updated on 15 May 2022

Position	Nation	Number	Name	OTP Bank Liga		UEFA Conference League		Hungarian Cup		Total (Hu Total)	
Position	Nation	Number	Name	Yellow card	Red card	Yellow card	Red card	Yellow card	Red card	Yellow card	Red card
GK	(Hungary)	1	Dániel Kovács	2	0	0	0	0	0	2 (2)	0 (0)
DF	(Romania)	4	Adrian Rus	4	0	0	0	0	0	4 (4)	0 (0)
DF	(Hungary)	5	Attila Fiola	9	2	0	0	1	1	10 (9)	3 (2)
DF	(North Macedonia)	6	Visar Musliu	1	1	0	0	0	0	1 (1)	1 (1)
MF	(Ukraine)	7	Ivan Petryak	5	0	0	0	0	0	5 (5)	0 (0)
MF	(Ukraine)	8	Yevhenii Makarenko	6	0	0	0	0	0	6 (6)	0 (0)
FW	(Georgia (country))	9	Budu Zivzivadze	1	0	0	0	0	0	1 (1)	0 (0)
DF	(Hungary)	11	Loïc Négo	2	0	2	0	0	0	4 (2)	0 (0)
MF	(Ukraine)	13	Artem Shabanov	2	0	0	0	0	0	2 (2)	0 (0)
MF	(Hungary)	14	Norbert Szendrei	5	0	0	0	0	0	5 (5)	0 (0)
FW	(Bosnia and Herzegovina)	19	Kenan Kodro	4	0	0	0	0	0	4 (4)	0 (0)
MF	(Portugal)	21	Rúben Pinto	3	0	0	0	1	0	4 (3)	0 (0)
DF	(Cape Verde)	22	Stopira	4	1	0	0	1	0	5 (4)	1 (1)
FW	(Hungary)	23	Palkó Dárdai	3	0	0	0	0	0	3 (3)	0 (0)
DF	(Czech Republic)	26	Michael Lüftner	0	0	0	0	1	0	1 (0)	0 (0)
DF	(Hungary)	29	Zsolt Kojnok	1	0	0	0	0	0	1 (1)	0 (0)
FW	(The Gambia)	30	Lamin Jallow	2	0	0	0	0	0	2 (2)	0 (0)
DF	(Hungary)	33	Barnabás Bese	1	0	0	0	0	0	1 (1)	0 (0)
MF	(Austria)	44	Peter Žulj	6	0	0	0	0	0	6 (6)	0 (0)
DF	(Germany)	55	Marcel Heister	5	1	0	0	1	0	6 (5)	1 (1)
DF	(Hungary)	65	Szilveszter Hangya	3	0	0	0	0	0	3 (3)	0 (0)
FW	(Nigeria)	70	Funsho Bamgboye	5	1	1	0	0	0	6 (5)	1 (1)
MF	(Ukraine)	80	Bohdan Lyednyev	0	0	0	0	1	0	1 (0)	0 (0)
MF	(Brazil)	95	Alef	2	0	0	0	0	0	2 (2)	0 (0)
MF	(France)	96	Lyes Houri	0	0	1	0	0	0	1 (0)	0 (0)
			TOTALS	77	6	4	0	6	1	87 (77)	7 (6)

=== Clean sheets ===
Last updated on 15 May 2022

Position	Nation	Number	Name	OTP Bank Liga	UEFA Conference League	Hungarian Cup	Total
1	(Hungary)	1	Dániel Kovács	7	0	1	8
2	(Hungary)	74	Ádám Kovácsik	0	0	0	0
3	(Hungary)	57	Martin Dala	0	0	0	0
4	(Hungary)	35	Bence Gundel-Takács	0	0	0	0
5	(Serbia)	42	Emil Rockov	0	0	0	0
			TOTALS	7	0	1	8
