= Palkó Dárdai =

German-Hungarian footballer (born 1999)

Personal information
- Full name: Pál Dárdai
- Date of birth: 24 April 1999 (age 27)
- Place of birth: Berlin, Germany
- Height: 1.78 m (5 ft 10 in)
- Position: Winger

Team information
- Current team: Puskás Akadémia FC
- Number: 10

Youth career
- 2006–2009: Seeburger SV
- 2009–2011: 1. FC Wilmersdorf
- 2011–2021: Hertha BSC

Senior career*
Years	Team	Apps	(Gls)
2017–2021	Hertha BSC II	50	(14)
2017–2021	Hertha BSC	9	(0)
2021–2023	Fehérvár	75	(12)
2023–2025	Hertha BSC	38	(7)
2025–	Puskás Akadémia	35	(7)

International career^{‡}
2017	Germany U18	2	(0)
2017–2018	Germany U19	2	(0)
2018–2019	Germany U20	2	(0)
2022–	Hungary	1	(0)
- * Club domestic league appearances and goals as of 25 October 2026 ‡ National team caps and goals as of 11:01, 21 November 2022 (UTC)

Pál "Palkó" Dárdai (born 24 April 1999) is a professional footballer who plays as a midfielder for Hungarian club Puskás Akadémia FC. Born in Germany, he plays for the Hungary national team.

== Club career ==
=== Youth ===
Dárdai began his youth career at Seeburger SV in 2006, before moving to 1. FC Wilmersdorf in 2009. In 2011, Dárdai moved to the youth academy of Hertha BSC, following his father's retirement from football after 14 years with Hertha.

=== Hertha BSC ===
Dárdai made his debut for Hertha BSC II on 18 March 2017, starting in an away match against Carl Zeiss Jena in the Regionalliga Nordost. Dárdai scored to put Hertha 2–1 ahead, before being substituted out with the match finishing as a 2–2 draw.

On 2 November 2017, Dárdai made his professional debut for Hertha BSC under his father in the UEFA Europa League, coming on as a substitute in the 79th minute for Alexander Esswein in the 2–0 home win against Ukrainian club Zorya Luhansk.

=== Fehérvár FC ===
On 5 January 2021, Dárdai signed with Fehérvár FC of the Nemzeti Bajnokság I.

=== Return to Hertha BSC ===
On 25 July 2023, Dárdai returned to Hertha BSC on a three-year contract, joining his brother Márton and his father and Hertha manager Pál Dárdai. He scored his first goal in the 2023–24 DFB-Pokal against FC Carl Zeiss Jena in a 5–0 victory on 12 August 2023.

On 16 February 2024, he scored a goal in a 3–2 victory over 1. FC Magdeburg in the 2023–24 2. Bundesliga season. On 12 April 2024, he scored twice in a 4–0 victory against FC Hansa Rostock.

=== Puskás Akadémia ===
On 8 July 2025, he was signed by Nemzeti Bajnokság I club Puskás Akadémia FC. He signed a contract to summer 2029.

== International career ==
Dárdai was a youth international for Germany, but declared his wish to represent Hungary after joining Fehérvár in 2021. He was included in the Hungarian squad for the 2021 UEFA Euro Under-21, but was cut due to an injury.

On 13 November 2022, Dárdai was called up to the Hungary national team for the friendly games against Luxembourg and Greece and gained his first cap against the latter as a substitute in the 72nd minute.

== Personal life ==
Palkó is the oldest son of Hungarian manager and former footballer Pál Dárdai, and the brother of the Hertha BSC footballers Márton and Bence Dárdai. Palkó's grandfather was also a footballer and manager, and also named Pál Dárdai.

== Career statistics ==
=== Club ===
As of match played 22 August 2025

Appearances and goals by club, season and competition
Club	Season	League			National cup (Note: Includes DFB-Pokal, Magyar Kupa)		Continental		Total		Ref.
Club	Season	Division	Apps	Goals	Apps	Goals	Apps	Goals	Apps	Goals	Ref.
Hertha BSC II	2016–17	Regionalliga Nordost	3	1	—		—		3	1	
Hertha BSC II	2017–18	Regionalliga Nordost	6	1	—		—		6	1	
Hertha BSC II	2018–19	Regionalliga Nordost	13	3	—		—		13	3	
Hertha BSC II	2019–20	Regionalliga Nordost	21	7	—		—		21	7	
Hertha BSC II	2020–21	Regionalliga Nordost	7	2	—		—		7	2	
Hertha BSC II	Total		50	14	0	0	0	0	50	14	—
Hertha BSC	2017–18	Bundesliga	2	0	0	0	2 (Note: Appearances in UEFA Europa League)	0	4	0	
Hertha BSC	2018–19	Bundesliga	7	0	1	0	0	0	8	0	
Hertha BSC	Total		9	0	1	0	2	0	12	0	—
Fehérvár	2020–21	Nemzeti Bajnokság I	14	2	2	0	0	0	16	2	
Fehérvár	2021–22	Nemzeti Bajnokság I	32	5	4	2	2 (Note: Appearances in UEFA Europa Conference League)	0	38	7	
Fehérvár	2022–23	Nemzeti Bajnokság I	29	5	0	0	6	2	35	7	
Fehérvár	Total		75	12	6	2	8	2	89	16	—
Hertha BSC	2023–24	2. Bundesliga	22	6	1	1	—		23	7	
Hertha BSC	2024–25	2. Bundesliga	16	1	2	0	—		18	1	
Hertha BSC	Total		38	7	3	1	—		41	8	
Puskás Akadémia	2025–26	Nemzeti Bajnokság I	5	1	0	0	2 (Note: Appearances in UEFA Conference League)	0	7	1	
Career total			177	34	10	3	12	2	199	39	—

=== International ===
As of match played 21 November 2022

Appearances and goals by national team and year
National team	Year	Apps	Goals
Hungary	2022	1	0
Total		1	0
