= Péter Szappanos =

Hungarian footballer (born 1990)

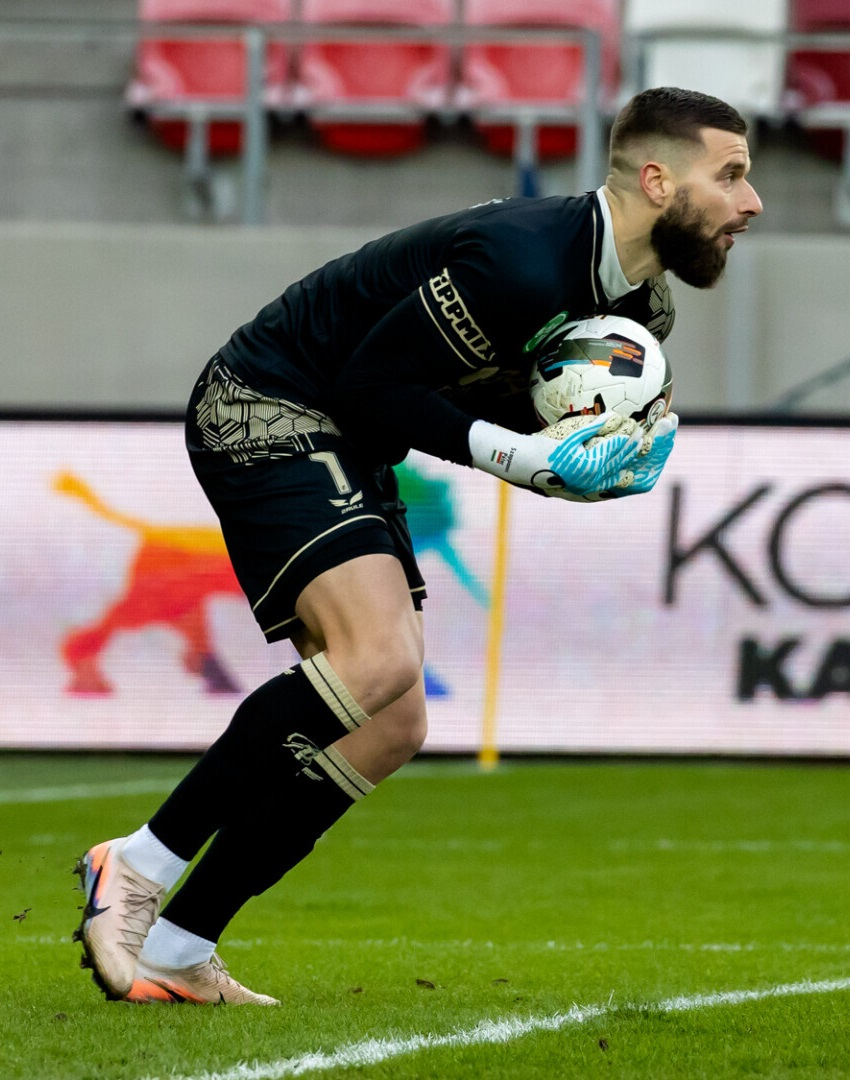
- Szappanos playing for Puskás Akadémia in 2026

Personal information
- Full name: Péter Szappanos
- Date of birth: 14 November 1990 (age 35)
- Place of birth: Jászberény, Hungary
- Height: 1.94 m (6 ft 4 in)
- Position: Goalkeeper

Team information
- Current team: Puskás Akadémia
- Number: 1

Youth career
- 2003–2005: Jászberény
- 2005–2009: Szent István
- 2008: Ferencváros

Senior career*
Years	Team	Apps	(Gls)
2009–2014	Dunaharaszti	112	(0)
2012–2013	→ Tatabánya (loan)	2	(0)
2014–2018	Zalaegerszeg	110	(0)
2018–2021	Mezőkövesd	86	(0)
2021–2023	Budapest Honvéd	53	(0)
2023–2024	Paks	31	(0)
2024–2025	Al-Fateh	17	(0)
2025	→ Paks (loan)	13	(0)
2025–	Puskás Akadémia	31	(0)

International career^{‡}
2022–	Hungary	2	(0)
- * Club domestic league appearances and goals as of 30 May 2026 ‡ National team caps and goals as of 10 June 2025

Péter Szappanos (born 14 November 1990) is a Hungarian international football player who plays for Hungarian club Puskás Akadémia and the Hungary national team.

== Career ==
=== Club career ===
Szappanos studied at the Ferencváros school. From 2009 to 2014, he participated in over a hundred league appearances for Dunaharaszti MTK, and from 2012 to 2013, he was loaned to FC Tatabány. From 2014 to 2018, Szappanos played in 110 league matches for Zalaegerszeg.

Szappanos played for Mezőkövesdi SE from 2018 to 2021, finishing 6th in his debut year and 4th in the 2019–2020 season in Nemzeti Bajnokság I. Over three seasons, he appeared in 86 top-flight games and won a silver medal in the 2020 Hungary Cup

Prior to the 2020–2021 season, Szappanos transferred to Budapest Honvéd, where he appeared in 53 league games over two seasons (until 2023).

On 8 July 2023 Szappanos signed with Paksi FC, and on 15 May 2024 he appeared in the Hungarian Cup final, helping his club win 2–0 over Ferencváros.

On 23 August 2024 Szappanos transferred to Al-Fateh in the Saudi Pro League. Shortly after signing, Shortly after joining, he started his first league game against Al-Qadsiah, losing 3–0.

On 14 May 2025, he won the 2025 Magyar Kupa final with Paksi FC after beating Ferencvárosi TC 4–3 on penalty shoot-out.

Later he ended his contract with his Saudi club by mutual consent and signed with the Puskás Akadémia.

== International career ==
Szappanos was called up by the senior Hungary team for the Nations League matches against England (home), Italy (away), Germany (home) and England (away) on 4, 7, 11 and 14 June 2022 respectively.

He made his debut for the Hungarian national team in a friendly match against Greece on 20 November 2022, playing one minute after appearing as a stoppage time substitute for Dénes Dibusz at Ferencváros Stadion.

On 14 May 2024, Szappanos was named in Hungary's squad for UEFA Euro 2024. He was an unused substitute in all three of the team's Group A matches.

== Club statistics ==
=== Club ===
As of match played 30 August 2025

Club	Season	League			Cup		League Cup		Continental		Total	
Club	Season	Division	Apps	Goals	Apps	Goals	Apps	Goals	Apps	Goals	Apps	Goals
Dunaharaszti	2008–09	NB III	4	0	0	0	–		–		4	0
Dunaharaszti	2009–10	NB III	22	0	4	0	–		–		26	0
Dunaharaszti	2010–11	NB III	29	0	5	0	–		–		34	0
Dunaharaszti	2011–12	NB III	28	0	3	1	–		–		31	1
Dunaharaszti	2013–14	NB III	29	0	1	0	–		–		30	0
Dunaharaszti	Total		112	0	13	1	0	0	0	0	125	1
Tatabánya	2012–13	NB II	2	0	0	0	–		–		2	0
Zalaegerszeg	2014–15	NB II	27	0	1	0	2	0	–		30	0
Zalaegerszeg	2015–16	NB II	26	0	1	0	–		–		27	0
Zalaegerszeg	2016–17	NB II	36	0	1	0	–		–		37	0
Zalaegerszeg	2017–18	NB II	21	0	0	0	–		–		21	0
Zalaegerszeg	Total		110	0	3	0	2	0	0	0	115	0
Mezőkövesd	2018–19	NB I	22	0	2	0	–		–		24	0
Mezőkövesd	2019–20	NB I	32	0	7	0	–		–		39	0
Mezőkövesd	2020–21	NB I	32	0	2	0	–		–		34	0
Mezőkövesd	Total		86	0	11	0	0	0	0	0	97	0
Budapest Honvéd	2021–22	NB I	30	0	2	0	–		–		32	0
Budapest Honvéd	2022–23	NB I	23	0	0	0	–		–		23	0
Budapest Honvéd	Total		53	0	2	0	0	0	0	0	55	0
Paks	2023–24	NB I	29	0	3	0	–		–		32	0
Paks	2024–25	NB I	2	0	0	0	6 (Note: Two appearances in UEFA Europa League, four appearances in UEFA Conference League)	0	–		8	0
Paks	Total		31	0	3	0	6	0	—		40	0
Al Fateh	2024–25	Saudi Pro League	17	0	1	0	–		–		18	0
Paks (loan)	2025	NB I	13	0	1	0	–		–		14	0
Puskás Akadémia	2025–26	NB I	4	0	0	0	–		–		4	0
Career total			427	0	34	1	2	0	6	0	469	1

=== International ===
As of match played 10 June 2025

Appearances and goals by national team and year
National team	Year	Apps	Goals
Hungary	2022	1	0
Hungary	2025	1	0
Total		2	0

== Honours ==
Paks

- Magyar Kupa: 2023–24, 2024–25
