= Michael Okeke =

Hungarian footballer (born 2004)

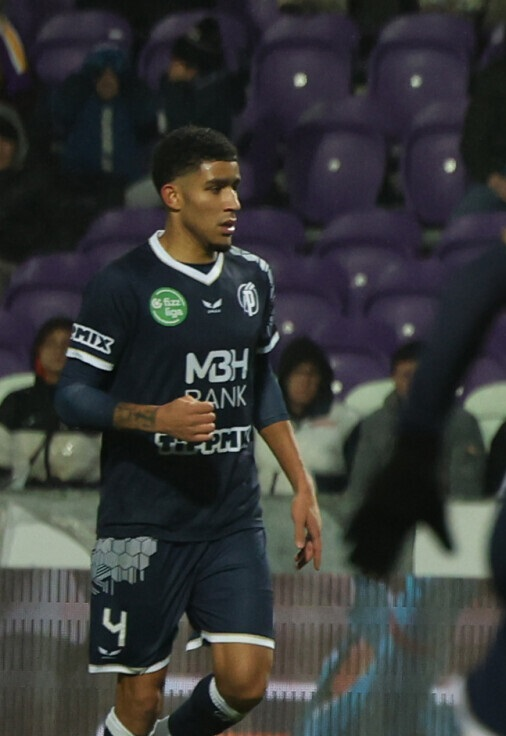
- Okeke playing for Puskás Akadémia in 2026

Personal information
- Full name: Michael Chinonso Okeke
- Date of birth: 16 October 2005 (age 21)
- Place of birth: Manchester, England
- Height: 1.88 m (6 ft 2 in)
- Position: Midfielder

Team information
- Current team: Puskás Akadémia
- Number: 4

Youth career
- –2016: Bolton Wanderers
- 2016–2023: Manchester City

Senior career*
| Years | Team | Apps | (Gls) |
| 2024–2025 | Manchester City | 0 | (0) |
| 2025– | Puskás Akadémia | 19 | (0) |

International career^{‡}
| 2022 | Hungary U18 | 3 | (0) |
| 2023–2024 | Hungary U19 | 2 | (0) |
| 2024– | Hungary U21 | 9 | (0) |
- * Club domestic league appearances and goals as of 30 May 2026 ‡ National team caps and goals as of 19 January 2026

Michael Chinonso Okeke (born 16 October 2005) is a footballer who plays as a midfielder for Nemzeti Bajnokság I club Puskás Akadémia. Born in England, he is a Hungary youth international.

== Early life ==
Okeke joined the youth academy of English Premier League side Manchester City at the age of ten.

== Club career ==
On 8 July 2023, he signed his first professional contract with Manchester City FC. In March 2024, he was training with the first team of Manchester City.

On 4 September 2025, Okeke joined Nemzeti Bajnokság I side Puskás Akadémia, signing a three-year contract. On 20 September 2025, he debuted in a 2–0 defeat from Győri ETO FC in the 2025–26 Nemzeti Bajnokság I season at the Pancho Aréna, Felcsút.

== International career ==
Okeke was called up to represent Hungary internationally for the 2025 UEFA European Under-21 Championship qualification. He debuted in the Hungary national under-21 football team against Slovakia on 5 September 2024 at Hidegkuti Nándor Stadion.

== Style of play ==
Okeke mainly operates as a midfielder or right-back.

== Personal life ==
Okeke was born to a Nigerian father and Hungarian mother.
