= Ákos Markgráf =

Hungarian footballer (born 2005)

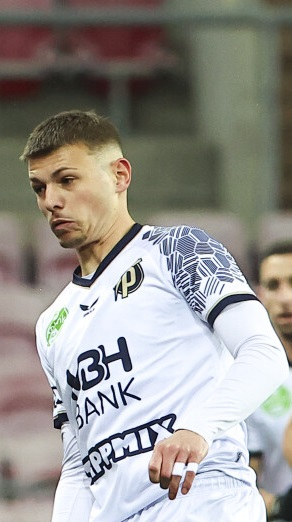
- Markgráf playing for Puskás Akadémia in 2025

Personal information
- Date of birth: 30 June 2005 (age 21)
- Place of birth: Budapest, Hungary
- Height: 1.79 m (5 ft 10 in)
- Positions: Center-back; left-back

Team information
- Current team: Copenhagen
- Number: 6

Youth career
- 2011–2014: Dalnoki Akadémia
- 2014: Veresegyház
- 2014–2025: Vasas
- 2015–2017: Gödöllő
- 2017–2020: MTK
- 2020–2024: Puskás Akadémia

Senior career*
Years	Team	Apps	(Gls)
2022–23	Puskás Akadémia II	24	(0)
2023–26	Puskás Akadémia	53	(1)
2026	Újpest FC	1	(0)
2026–	Copenhagen	9	(0)

International career^{‡}
2022	Hungary U18	1	(0)
2023	Hungary U19	3	(0)
2024	Hungary U20	2	(0)
2025–	Hungary U21	8	(0)
2026–	Hungary	2	(0)
- * Club domestic league appearances and goals as of 20 November 2026 ‡ National team caps and goals as of 18 November 2026

Ákos Markgráf (born 30 June 2005) is a Hungarian professional footballer who plays as a defender for Danish club F.C. Copenhagen and the Hungary national team.

== Career ==
Markgráf was born in Budapest and joined Puskás Akadémia in 2020, progressing through every age-group team within the club's youth system. During his development, he also featured for the club's reserve side in Nemzeti Bajnokság III, gaining experience in senior football. Ahead of the 2023–24 season, he was promoted to the first-team squad and made his Nemzeti Bajnokság I debut on 8 December 2023 in a 3–0 home win against Kecskemét. On 28 May 2025, he extended his contract with the club until the summer of 2028.

On 4 August, 2026, he was signed by Danish club Copenhagen on a five-year contract.

== Career statistics ==
=== Club ===
As of match played 29 October 2026

Appearances and goals by club, season and competition
Club	Season	League			Magyar Kupa		Europe		Total	
Club	Season	Division	Apps	Goals	Apps	Goals	Apps	Goals	Apps	Goals
Puskás Akadémia II	2022–23	Nemzeti Bajnokság III	6	0	—		—		6	0
Puskás Akadémia II	2023–24	Nemzeti Bajnokság III	15	0	—		—		15	0
Puskás Akadémia II	2024–25	Nemzeti Bajnokság III	2	0	—		—		2	0
Puskás Akadémia II	2025–26	Nemzeti Bajnokság III	1	0	—		—		1	0
Puskás Akadémia II	Total		24	0	—		—		24	0
Puskás Akadémia	2023–24	Nemzeti Bajnokság I	6	0	—		—		6	0
Puskás Akadémia	2024–25	Nemzeti Bajnokság I	17	0	1	0	0	0	18	0
Puskás Akadémia	2025–26	Nemzeti Bajnokság I	30	1	0	0	2 (Note: Appearances in UEFA Conference League)	0	32	1
Puskás Akadémia	Total		53	1	1	0	2	0	56	1
Copenhagen	2026–27	Danish Superliga	7	0	2	0	4	0	13	0
Career total			84	1	3	0	6	0	93	1

=== International ===
As of match played 17 November 2026

Appearances and goals by national team and year
National team	Year	Apps	Goals
Hungary	2026	2	0
Total		2	0
