= András Németh (footballer) =

Hungarian footballer

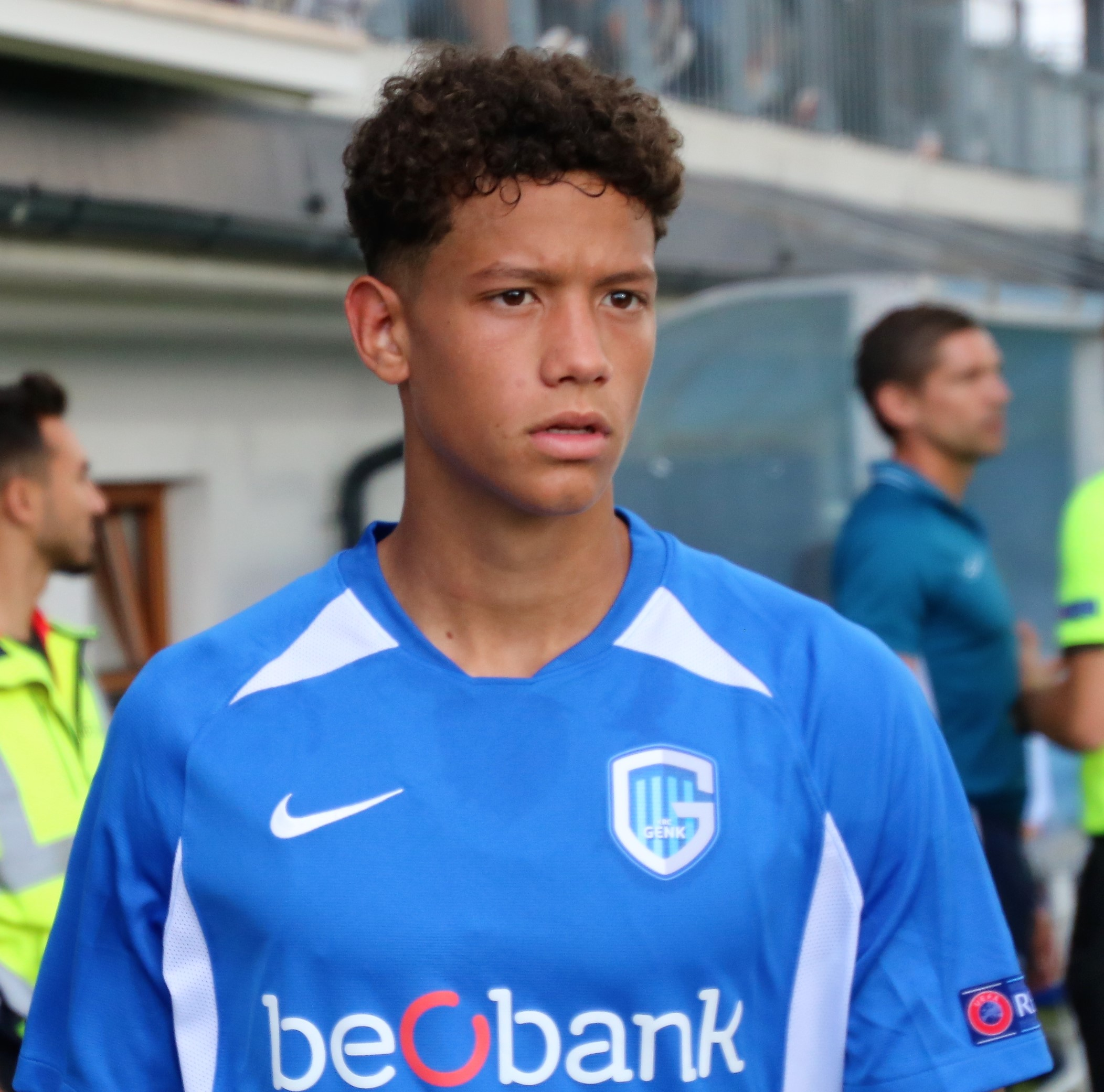
- Németh with Genk in 2019

Personal information
- Full name: András Németh
- Date of birth: 9 November 2002 (age 24)
- Place of birth: Cape Town, South Africa
- Height: 1.87 m (6 ft 2 in)
- Position: Forward

Team information
- Current team: Puskás Akadémia
- Number: 90

Youth career
- 2010–2015: Vasas
- 2016: Sporting Hasselt
- 2016–2020: Genk

Senior career*
Years	Team	Apps	(Gls)
2020–2023	Genk	18	(2)
2020	→ Lommel (loan)	2	(0)
2023–2025	Hamburger SV	39	(2)
2024–2025	→ Preußen Münster (loan)	20	(0)
2025–	Puskás Akadémia	32	(7)

International career^{‡}
2017	Hungary U16	2	(1)
2018–2019	Hungary U17	13	(5)
2020–	Hungary U21	7	(5)
2022–	Hungary	4	(1)
- * Club domestic league appearances and goals as of 17 October 2026 ‡ National team caps and goals as of 19 November 2023

András Németh (born 9 November 2002) is footballer who plays as a forward for NB I club Puskás Akadémia. Born in South Africa, he plays for the Hungary national team.

== Club career ==
=== Genk ===
On 16 January 2022, he scored his first goal in a 4–1 victory against Beerschot A.C. at the Cegeka Arena in the 2021–22 Belgian First Division A. On 24 April 2022, he scored the only and winning goal against Gent at the Ghelamco Arena.

=== Hamburger SV ===
On 27 January 2023, Németh signed a 3.5-year contract with Hamburger SV in Germany.

On 5 February 2023, he scored his first goal in a 2–0 away victory against Hansa Rostock in the 2022–23 2. Bundesliga season at the Ostseestadion. His second goal was scored in the subsequent match, on 11 February 2023, in a 3–3 draw against 1. FC Heidenheim at the Voith-Arena.

In an interview with Nemzeti Sport, Hamburg's trainer, Tim Walter said that Németh has to improve physically and his skills with his left foot.

On 22 April 2023, his inner knee was broken. On 25 April 2023, his broken knee was operated. In July 2023, he started his individualized training. On 23 July 2023, after three months of recovery, he played his first match against Scottish Premiership club Rangers

On 13 August 2023, he gave an assist in a 4–3 victory against Essen in the first round of the 2023–24 DFB-Pokal.

==== Loan to Preußen Münster ====
On 22 August 2024, he was loaned to Preußen Münster.

=== Puskás Akadémia ===
On 25 June 2025, Németh signed with Hungarian NB I club Puskás Akadémia.

== International career ==
Németh was born in South Africa to a Hungarian father and Black South African mother. He is a youth international for Hungary.

He was part of the Hungarian U17 national team at the 2019 UEFA European Under-17 Championship and 2019 FIFA U-17 World Cup,

He debuted in the Hungary senior national team against Luxembourg on 17 November 2022. He also scored his first goal on his debut at the Stade de Luxembourg in Luxembourg City. In an interview right after the end of the match, he said the following: "It is a big happiness and honour for me to represent Hungary". However, he suffered a knee injury after the match so he had to leave the national team the following day and could not play against Greece in Budapest.

On 7 November 2023, Marco Rossi invited him to play against Bulgaria and Montenegro in the UEFA Euro 2024 qualifying matches. However, Rossi advised him to leave Hamburg because he does not receive enough opportunity to play regularly. On 16 November 2023, he entered the pitch as a substitute for Martin Ádám in the 74th minute in the penultimate match of the UEFA Euro 2024 qualifying Group G against Bulgaria.

== Career statistics ==
=== Club ===
As of match played 5 April 2025

Appearances and goals by club, season and competition
Club	Season	League			Cup		Continental		Other		Total	
Club	Season	Division	Apps	Goals	Apps	Goals	Apps	Goals	Apps	Goals	Apps	Goals
Genk	2019–20	Belgian First Division A	0	0	0	0	0	0	0	0	0	0
Genk	2021–22	Belgian First Division A	3	1	0	0	0	0	2	1	5	2
Genk	2021–22	Belgian First Division A	15	1	1	0	—		—		16	1
Genk	Total		18	2	1	0	0	0	2	1	21	3
Lommel (loan)	2019–20	Proximus League	2	0	—		—		—		2	0
Jong Genk	2022–23	Belgian First Division B	4	1	—		—		—		4	1
Hamburger SV	2022–23	2. Bundesliga	11	2	0	0	—		—		11	2
Hamburger SV	2023–24	2. Bundesliga	28	0	3	0	—		—		31	0
Hamburger SV	Total		39	2	3	0	—		—		42	2
Preußen Münster (loan)	2024–25	2. Bundesliga	20	0	1	0	—		—		21	0
Career total			83	5	5	0	0	0	2	1	90	6

=== International ===
As of match played on 19 November 2023

Appearances and goals by national team and year
National team	Year	Apps	Goals
Hungary	2022	1	1
Hungary	2023	3	0
Total		4	1

As of match played on 17 November 2022
Scores and results list Hungary's goal tally first, score column indicates score after each Németh goal.

List of international goals scored by András Németh
No.	Date	Venue	Cap	Opponent	Score	Result	Competition
1	17 November 2022	Stade de Luxembourg, Luxembourg City, Luxembourg	1	Luxembourg	2–1	2–2	Friendly
