= Zoárd Nagy =

Hungarian footballer (born 2000)

Personal information
- Full name: Zoárd Kornél Nagy
- Date of birth: 18 April 2000 (age 26)
- Place of birth: Budapest, Hungary
- Height: 1.96 m (6 ft 5 in)
- Position: Forward

Team information
- Current team: Puskás Akadémia
- Number: 99

Youth career
- 2005–2014: Vác
- 2010–2011: → Leányfalui (loan)
- 2014–2019: Vasas

Senior career*
Years	Team	Apps	(Gls)
2019–2021	Vasas	0	(0)
2019–2020	→ Taksony (loan)	18	(1)
2020–2021	→ Balatonfüred (loan)	15	(9)
2021	ŠTK Šamorín	8	(1)
2021–2023	Mosonmagyaróvár	58	(15)
2023–2025	Csákvár	61	(28)
2025–	Puskás Akadémia	5	(0)
2025–	Puskás Akadémia II	2	(2)
2026	→ FK Csíkszereda (loan)	12	(0)
- * Club domestic league appearances and goals as of 24 April 2026

Zoárd Kornél Nagy (born 18 April 2000) is a Hungarian professional footballer who plays as a forward for Nemzeti Bajnokság I club Puskás Akadémia.

== Honours ==
Mosonmagyaróvár

- Nemzeti Bajnokság III: 2021–22

Individual

- Nemzeti Bajnokság II top scorer: 2024–25 (18 goals)
