= Martin Kern (footballer) =

Hungarian footballer (born 2006)

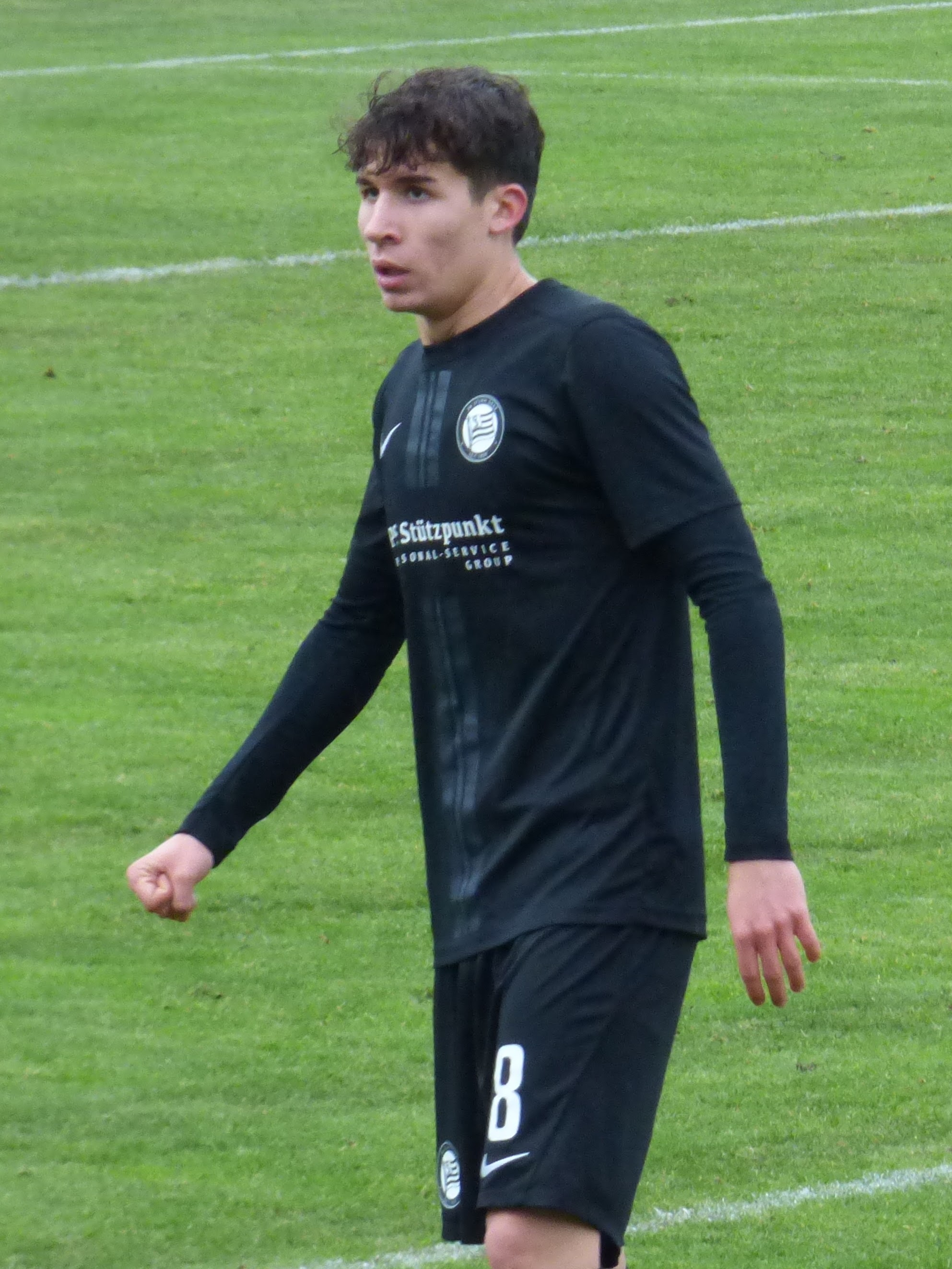
- Kern in 2024

Personal information
- Date of birth: 23 March 2006 (age 20)
- Place of birth: Szeged, Hungary
- Height: 1.76 m (5 ft 9 in)
- Position: Midfielder

Team information
- Current team: Puskás Akadémia
- Number: 74

Youth career
- –2017: Szilády RFC
- 2017–: Puskás Akadémia

Senior career*
Years	Team	Apps	(Gls)
2023–2024	Puskás Akadémia	2	(0)
2024–2025	Sturm Graz	0	(0)
2024–2025	Sturm Graz II	26	(0)
2025–	Puskás Akadémia	19	(1)

International career^{‡}
2021–2022	Hungary U16	9	(1)
2023–2024	Hungary U17	14	(2)
2024	Hungary U18	3	(0)
2024–	Hungary U19	7	(0)
- * Club domestic league appearances and goals as of 30 May 2026 ‡ National team caps and goals as of 15 November 2024

Martin Kern (born 23 March 2006) is a Hungarian professional footballer who plays as a midfielder for Nemzeti Bajnokság I club Puskás Akadémia FC and the Hungary national under-19 football team.

== Club career ==
=== Puskás Akadémia ===
After playing his early years at local side Szilády RFC, Kern joined Puskás Akadémia's youth setup. After playing for the club's U17 and U19 sides, Kern made his debut for the senior team during 2023, in a 1–0 home league win against Zalaegerszegi, before making his second appearance a week later in a 1–1 draw against Fehérvár, starting both games.

=== Sturm Graz ===
On 3 June 2024, Kern signed for Austrian Bundesliga champions Sturm Graz on a long-term contract.

=== Puskás Akadémia ===
On 5 August 2025, Kern signed for Nemzeti Bajnokság I club Puskás Akadémia FC on four years contract.

== International career ==
Kern has played for the Hungary U16 and Hungary U17 teams and has captained both on several occasions. For the under-16 team Kern has made 9 appearances, scoring 1 goal. For the under-17 team, he has made 14 appearances thus far, scoring two goals, including a goal during the 2023 UEFA European Under-17 Championship, held in Hungary. Kern has played 3 games for the Hungary U19, most recently in a 3–1 win against Montenegro U19.
