= Pancho Aréna =

Stadium in Felcsút, Hungary

Coordinates: 47.4640°N 18.5868°E

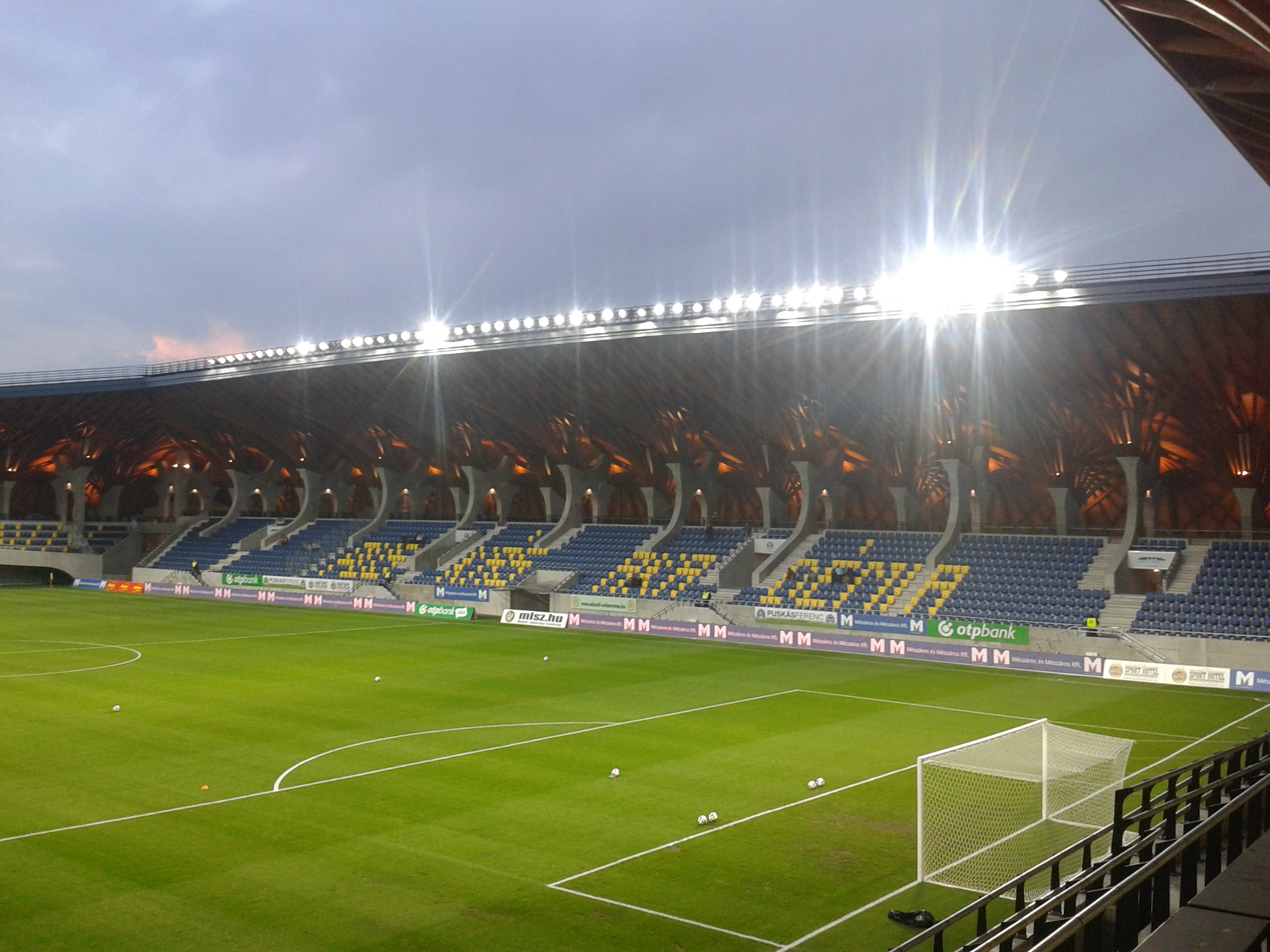
- UEFA Elite Stadium
- Interactive map of Pancho Aréna
- Location: Felcsút, Hungary
- Owner: Felcsúti Utánpótlás Neveléséért Alapítvány
- Operator: Puskás Akadémia FC
- Capacity: 3,865
- Surface: Grass; Field
- Field size: 105x68m

Construction
- Groundbreaking: 2012
- Opened: 21 April 2014
- Cost: HUF 3.8 billion
- Architects: Imre Makovecz; Tamás Dobrosi
- Structural engineer: László Pongor

Tenants
- Puskás Akadémia FC; Fehérvár FC (2016–2018)

Pancho Aréna is a stadium in Felcsút, Hungary. It is primarily used for football matches and serves as the home stadium for Puskás Akadémia FC. Between 2015 and 2018, the stadium also hosted the three-time champions Fehérvár FC due to the reconstruction of Sóstói Stadion.

== History ==
The stadium officially opened on 21 April 2014, featuring the final of the 2014 Puskás Cup.

On 26 April 2014, the first Hungarian League match was played at the stadium between Puskás Akadémia and Videoton. The match ended with 3–1 away win.

On 30 June 2016, the first UEFA Europa League match took place at the stadium when Videoton FC, now MOL Fehérvár FC, and FC Zaria Bălți met in the qualifying rounds of the Europa League. It occurred in Pancho Aréna due to the demolition of Videoton's home stadium, Sóstói Stadion.

Pancho Aréna was listed among the top three most beautiful stadiums of the world according to stadiumdb.com: "The wood-lined curved interior to the stand gives spectators the feeling that they are attending a Sunday church service, not a football match. The 3,500 seater stadium opened in 2014 and was the brainchild of local architect Imre Makovecz".

On 26 March 2018, the first international match was played at the stadium when Bulgaria hosted Kazakhstan in a friendly match. The match ended with a 2–1 win for Bulgaria.

On 31 October 2023, it was announced that the Israel national football team would play their remaining UEFA Euro 2024 qualifying matches against Switzerland and Romania at the stadium, a decision influenced by the ongoing Gaza war. On 15 November 2023, Israel hosted Switzerland and drew at the stadium. On 18 November 2023, Israel hosted Romania in the UEFA Euro 2024 qualifying match. Romania beat Israel 2-1 and qualified for the UEFA Euro 2024.

== Controversy ==
Many allegations of corruption have surfaced regarding the stadium, as Hungary's prime minister, Viktor Orbán (known for his passion for football), spent much of his childhood in the village. Pancho Arena was built just meters away from his Felcsút estate. Although the stadium was not constructed directly using government funds, companies that provided the majority of the funding won several high-value public procurement procedures during Orbán's prime ministership. Additionally, Orbán's government passed laws granting benefits to companies supporting sports investments. Allegations were fueled by the fact that the stadium seats 3,500 people, while the total population of the village is under 1,700.

== Milestone matches ==
26 April 2014	Puskás Akadémia (Hungary)	1–3	(Hungary) Videoton	2013–14 Nemzeti Bajnokság I First Nemzeti Bajnokság I match
	Tischler 63'	(Report)	Nikolić 20'; Zé Luís 74'; Filipe Oliveira 78'	Attendance: 3,633; Referee: Viktor Kassai (Hungary)

24 September 2015	Puskás Akadémia (Hungary)	0–2	(Hungary) Debrecen	2014–15 Magyar Kupa (First Magyar Kupa match)
		(Report)	Szakály 53'; Kulcsár 94'	Referee: Csaba Pintér (Hungary)

30 June 2016	Videoton (Hungary)	3–0	(Moldova) Zaria Bălți	2016–17 UEFA Europa League (First UEFA Europa League match)
		[(Report)]		Attendance: 2,321; Referee: Enea Jorgji (Albanian)

17 July 2018	MOL Vidi (Hungary)	2–1	(Luxembourg) F91 Dudelange	2018–19 UEFA Champions League (first UEFA Champions League match)
20:15	Lazović 18'; Šćepović 58'	Report	Clément 54'	Attendance: 2,514; Referee: Donald Robertson (Scotland)

== Milestone matches (youth squad) ==
21 April 2014	Puskás Akadémia (Hungary)	0–1	(Spain) La Fábrica	2014 Puskás Cup Final (First match)
		(Report)	Miguel Garcia 49'	Attendance: 4,000; Referee: Viktor Kassai (Hungary)

4 November 2015	Puskás Akadémia (Hungary)	1–0	(Scotland) Celtic	2015–16 UEFA Youth League (First international match)
	Damásdi 20'	(Report)		Attendance: 1,230; Referee: Vadims Direktorenko (Latvia)

== International ==
24 March 2018	Bulgaria	2–1	Kazakhstan	Friendly
	Popov 23'; Bodurov 90+4'	(Report)	55' Tungyshbayev	Attendance: 100; Referee: (Hungary) Bognár

15 November 2023	Israel	1–1	Switzerland	UEFA Euro 2024 qualifying Group I
	Weissman 88'	Report	36' Vargas	Referee: (England) Taylor

18 November 2023	Israel	1–2	Romania	UEFA Euro 2024 qualifying Group I
				Referee: (France) Letexier

== Attendances ==
As of 21 December 2018

Puskás Akadémia only played three matches at the Pancho Aréna during the 2013–14 season. This table includes only domestic league matches.

Season	Puskás Akadémia FC								Ref
Season	Division	GP	Average	Change	Highest Gate		Lowest Gate		Ref
2014–15	NB I	15	1,649	–	3,812	vs Ferencváros	704	vs Szombathelyi Haladás	
2015–16	NB I	16	1,699	+3.0%	3,798	vs Ferencváros	708	vs Paks	
2016–17	NB II	15	818	–49.5%	1,537	vs Balmazújváros	460	vs Budaörs	
2017–18	NB I	16	1,199	+46.6%	3,127	vs Ferencváros	200	vs Debrecen	
2018–19	NB I	17	1,340	+11.8%	3,865	vs Ferencváros	120	vs Kisvárda	

== Gallery ==
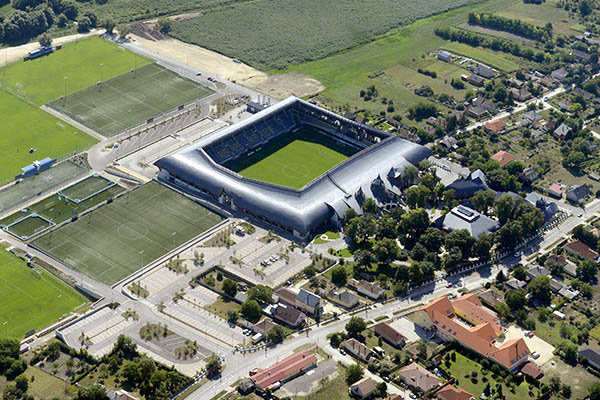
Aerial view

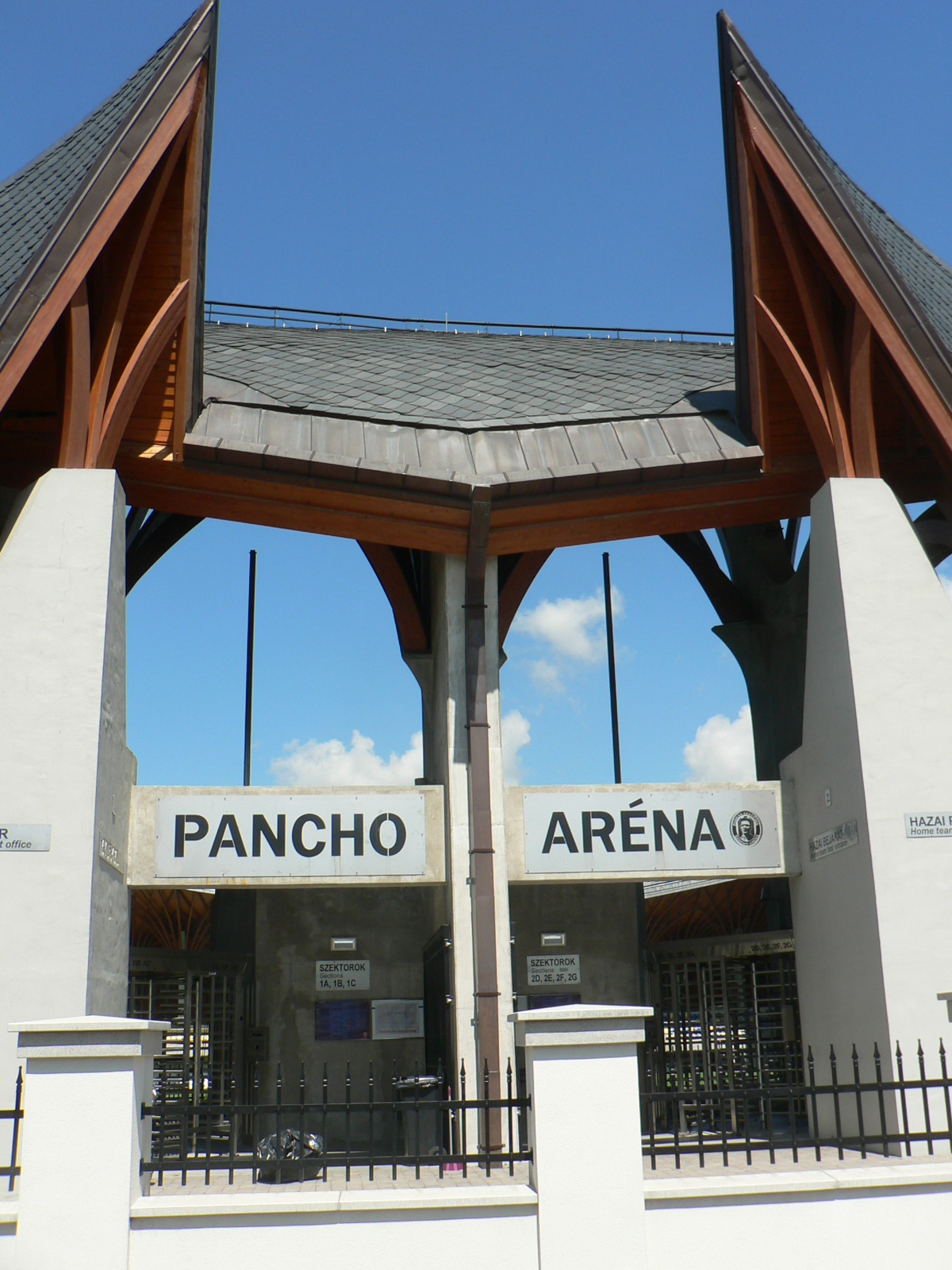
The main entrance

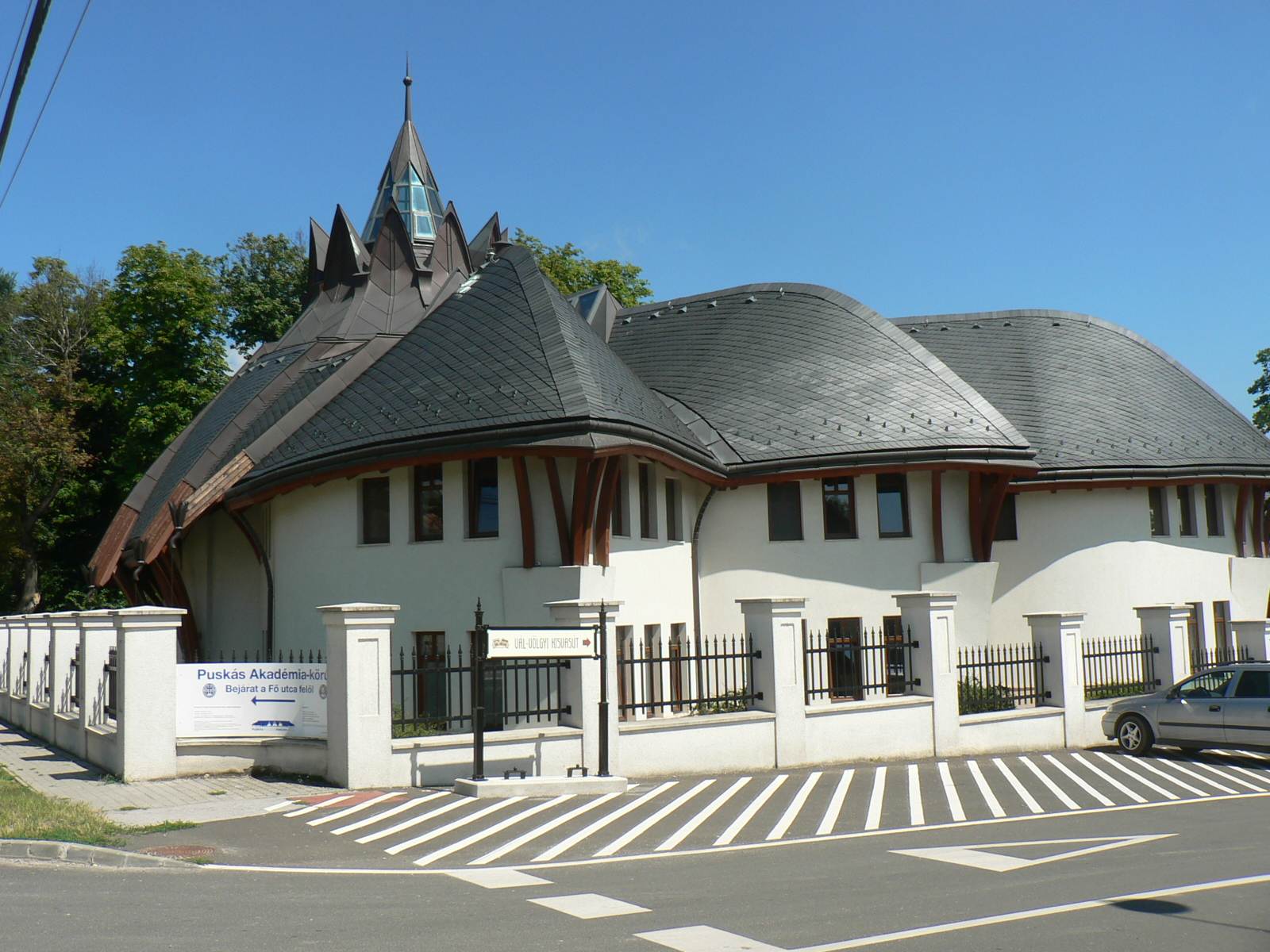
The Pancho Aréna from the Főutca of Felcsút

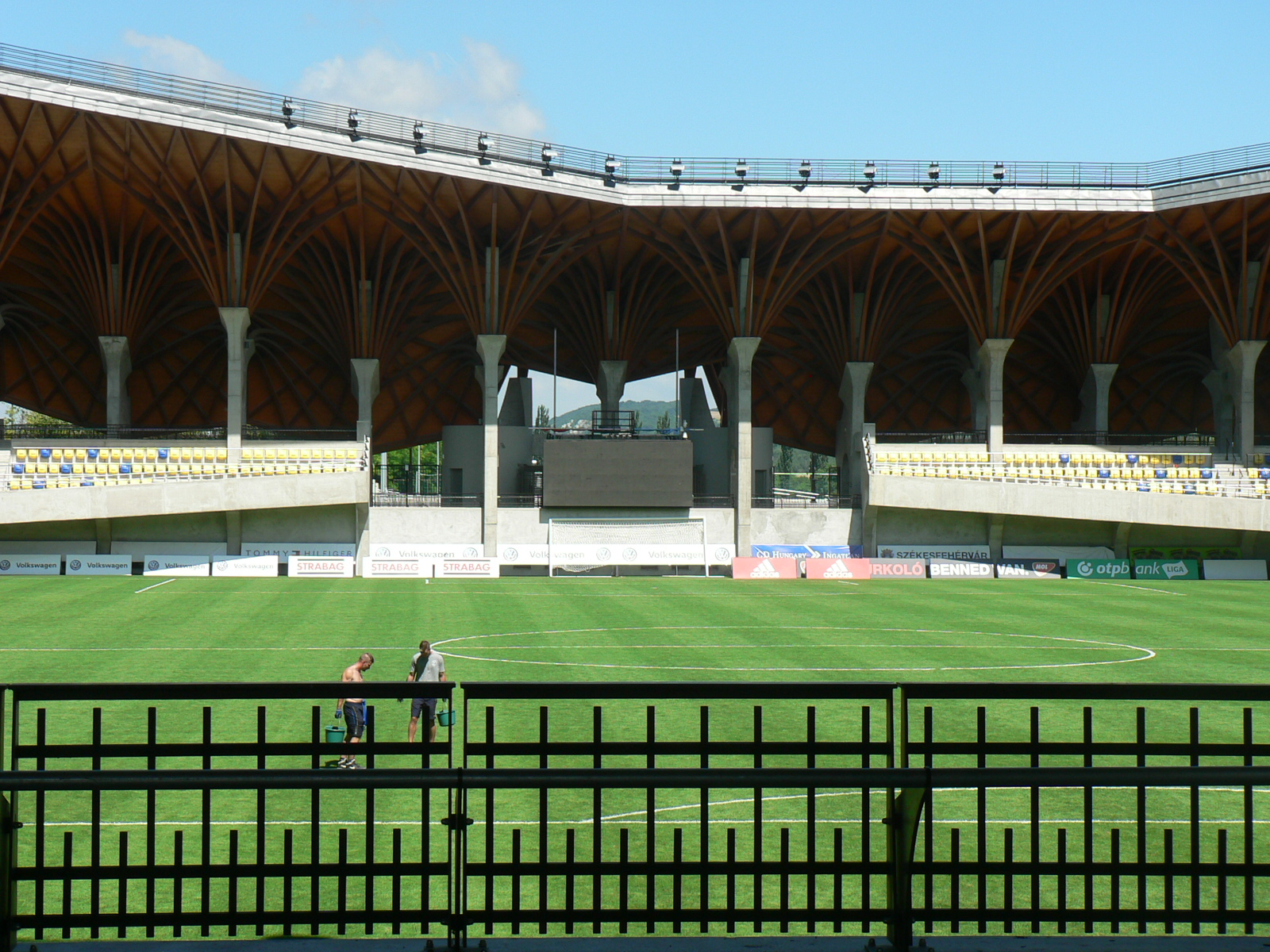
The interior

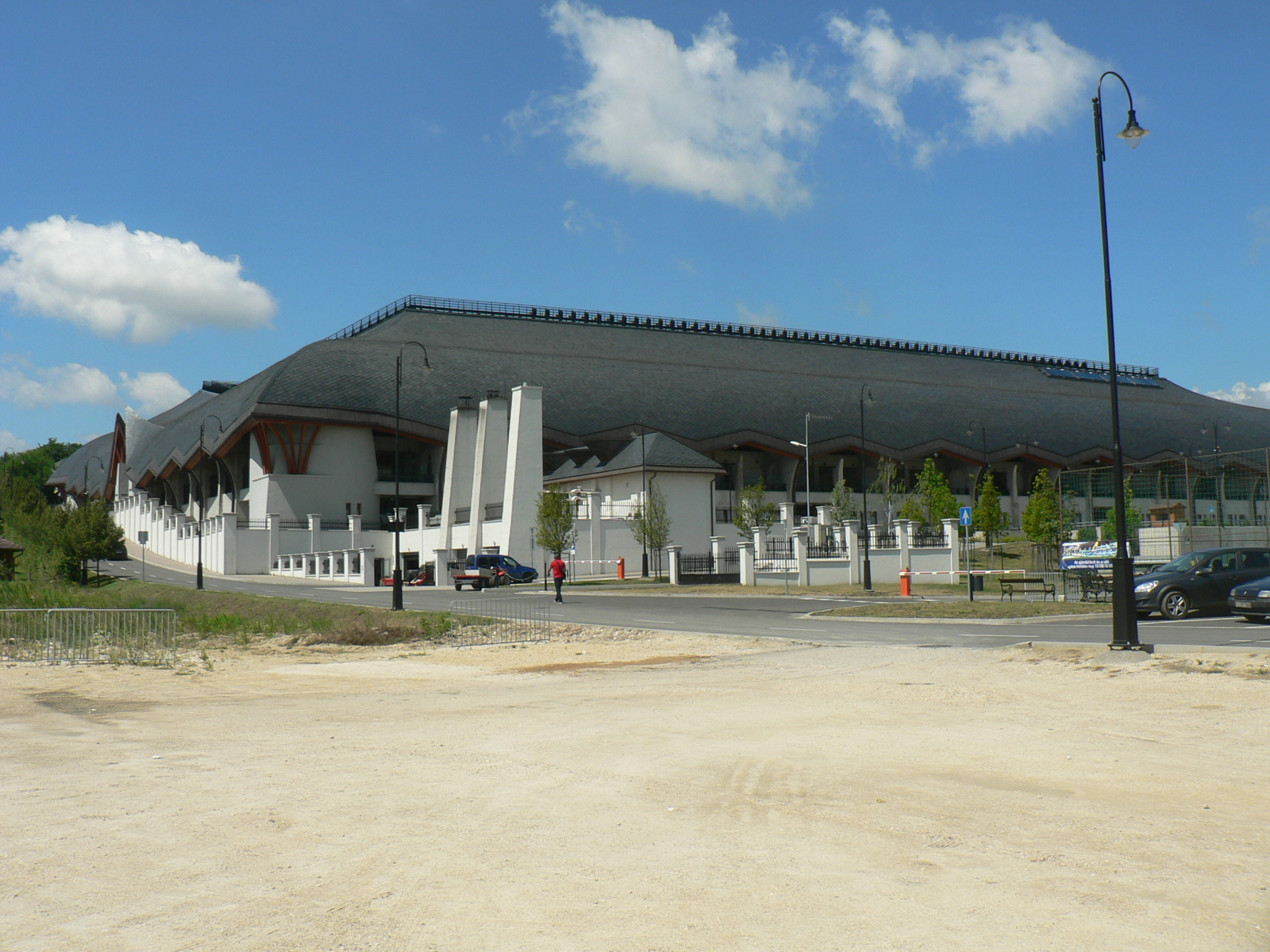
The view of Pancho Aréna from the Vál-völgyi train

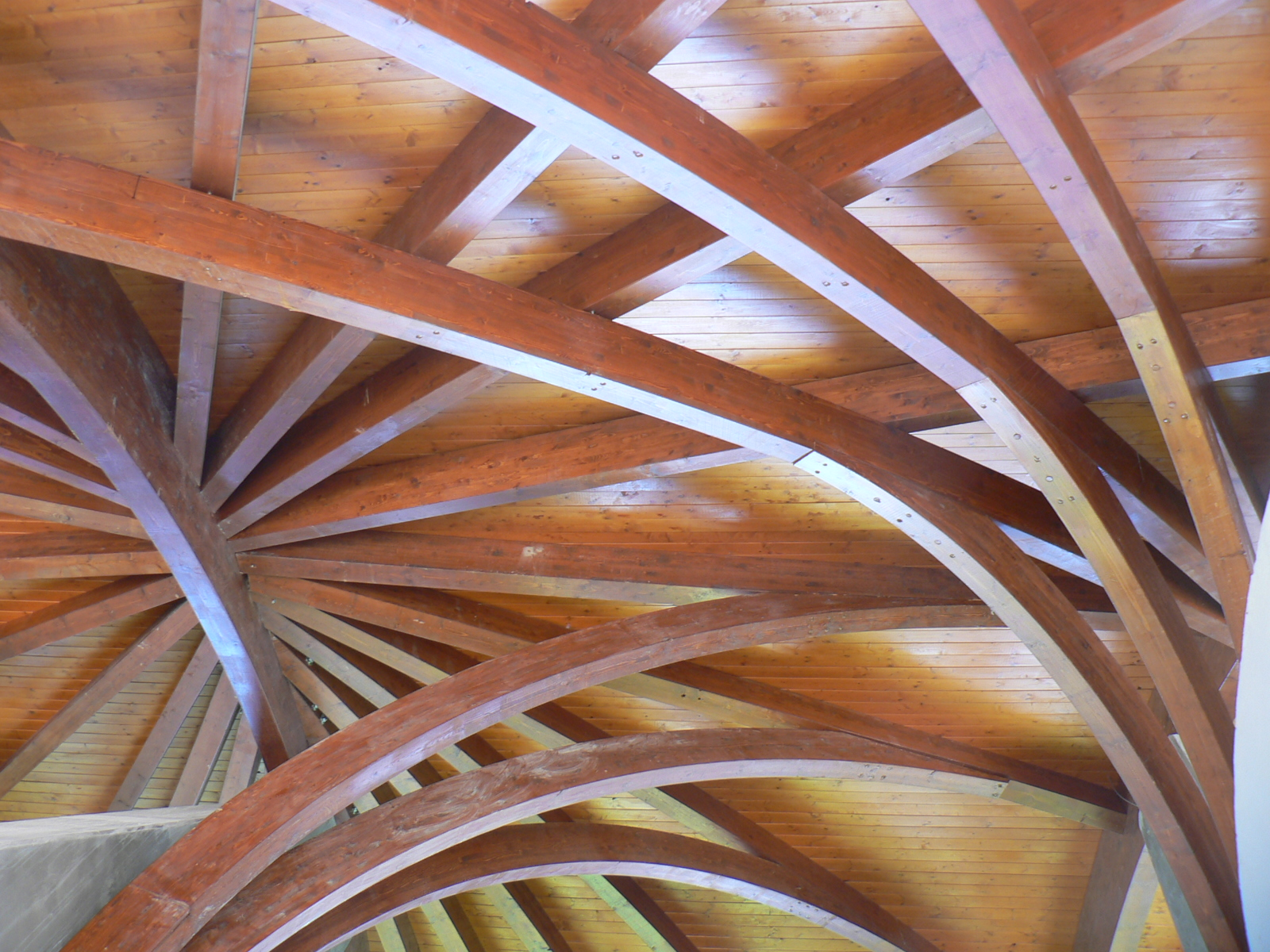
The roof of the Pancho Aréna
