= 2023–24 MTK Budapest FC season =

MTK
2023–24 season
- Owner: Sándor Zakor
- Manager: Dávid Horváth
- Stadium: Hidegkuti Nándor Stadion
- Nemzeti Bajnokság I: 8th
- Magyar Kupa: Quarter-finals
- Top goalscorer: League: István Bognár (9); All: István Bognár (10)
- Highest home attendance: 5,322 v Ferencváros (30 September 2023, Nemzeti Bajnokság I)
- Lowest home attendance: 1,734 v Mezőkövesd (23 February 2024, Nemzeti Bajnokság I)
- Average home league attendance: 2,810
- Biggest win: 6–1 v Gesztely (Away, 17 September 2023, Magyar Kupa)
- Biggest defeat: 1–6 v Ferencváros (Home, 30 September 2023, Nemzeti Bajnokság I); 0–5 v Puskás Akadémia (Home, 22 October 2023, Nemzeti Bajnokság I); 1–6 v Puskás Akadémia (Pancho Aréna, 18 February 2024, Nemzeti Bajnokság I)
Home colours	Away colours	Third colours

The 2023–24 season was Magyar Testgyakorlók Köre Budapest Futball Club's 111th competitive season, 1st season in the Nemzeti Bajnokság I following their promotion from the Nemzeti Bajnokság II in the previous season and 121st year in existence as a football club. In addition to the domestic league, MTK participated in that season's editions of the Magyar Kupa.

== Squad ==
Squad at end of season

Note: Flags indicate national team as defined under FIFA eligibility rules; some limited exceptions apply. Players may hold more than one non-FIFA nationality.

No.	Pos.	Nation	Player
1	GK	HUN	Patrik Demjén
2	DF	HUN	Benedek Varju
3	DF	SRB	Nemanja Antonov
4	DF	HUN	Dávid Bobál
5	DF	HUN	Zsombor Nagy
6	MF	HUN	Mihály Kata
7	MF	HUN	Zoltán Stieber
10	MF	HUN	István Bognár
11	FW	BIH	Marin Jurina
13	GK	HUN	Gergő Rácz
14	MF	HUN	Artúr Horváth
15	MF	HUN	Márk Kosznovszky

No.	Pos.	Nation	Player
16	MF	HUN	Bence Végh
17	FW	SVK	Nikolas Špalek
18	FW	HUN	Krisztián Németh
20	FW	HUN	Mátyás Kovács
21	MF	HUN	Gergő Kocsis
22	DF	UKR	Viktor Hey
23	MF	SEN	Khaly Thiam
24	DF	HUN	Dániel Vadnai
25	DF	HUN	Tamás Kádár
27	DF	HUN	Patrik Kovács
29	FW	HUN	Rajmund Molnár
30	MF	HUN	Barnabás Biben

== Transfers ==
=== Transfers in ===
Transfer window	Pos.	No.	Player	From
Summer	MF	—	(Hungary) Gergő Földi	Youth team
Summer	FW	—	(Hungary) Botond Herczeg	Youth team
Summer	GK	1	(Hungary) Patrik Demjén	Zalaegerszeg
Summer	DF	3	(Serbia) Nemanja Antonov	Free agent (Note: Previous club Újpest.)
Summer	DF	4	(Hungary) Dávid Bobál	Mezőkövesd
Summer	GK	13	(Hungary) Gergő Rácz	Paks
Summer	MF	16	(Hungary) Bence Végh	Mosonmagyaróvár
Summer	DF	22	(Ukraine) Viktor Hey	Free agent (Note: Previous club Kisvárda.)
Summer	DF	25	(Hungary) Tamás Kádár	Paks
Summer	DF	27	(Hungary) Patrik Kovács	(Austria) Red Bull Salzburg
Summer	MF	34	(Hungary) Noel Kenesei	Youth team
Winter	FW	11	(Bosnia and Herzegovina) Marin Jurina	Diósgyőr

=== Transfers out ===
Transfer window	Pos.	No.	Player	To
Summer	MF	8	(Hungary) Szabolcs Mezei	Paks
Summer	DF	15	(Slovakia) János Szépe	Győr
Summer	GK	20	(Hungary) Bence Varga	Kecskemét
Summer	DF	21	(Hungary) Patrik Poór	Released
Summer	GK	25	(Hungary) Bence Somodi	Released (Note: Joined Csákvár.)
Summer	DF	26	(Hungary) Gergely Kapronczai	Released (Note: Joined III. Kerület.)
Summer	MF	27	(Hungary) Martin Palincsár	Szeged

=== Loans in ===
Transfer window	Pos.	No.	Player	From	End date
Summer	FW	29	(Hungary) Rajmund Molnár	Haladás	End of season

=== Loans out ===
Transfer window	Pos.	No.	Player	To	End date
Summer	DF	5	(Hungary) Zsombor Nagy	Szeged	Middle of season
Summer	DF	13	(Hungary) Roland Lehoczky	Mezőkövesd	Middle of season
Summer	FW	31	(Hungary) Benedek Barkóczi	Kozármisleny	End of season
Winter	FW	8	(Hungary) Dániel Zsóri	Budafok	End of season
Winter	FW	11	(Hungary) Ákos Zuigéber	Szeged	End of season
Winter	DF	13	(Hungary) Roland Lehoczky	Tiszakécske	End of season
Winter	FW	28	(Hungary) Ádám Miknyóczki	Pécs	End of season

== Competitions ==
=== Overview ===
Competition	First match	Last match	Starting round	Final position	Record							
Competition	First match	Last match	Starting round	Final position	Pld	W	D	L	GF	GA	GD	Win %
Nemzeti Bajnokság I	28 July 2023	17 May 2024	Matchday 1	8th	33	12	8	13	43	62	−19	36.36
Magyar Kupa	17 September 2023	2 April 2024	Round of 64	Quarter-finals	4	3	0	1	15	4	+11	75.00
Total					37	15	8	14	58	66	−8	40.54

Source: Competitions

=== Nemzeti Bajnokság I ===
==== League table ====
Pos	Team	Pld	W	D	L	GF	GA	GD	Pts
6	Kecskemét	33	13	6	14	45	45	0	45
7	Diósgyőr	33	12	9	12	50	56	−6	45
8	MTK	33	12	8	13	43	62	−19	44
9	Zalaegerszeg	33	12	7	14	54	60	−6	43
10	Újpest	33	11	4	18	45	67	−22	37

Source: Hungarian Football Federation (in Hungarian), Soccerway
Rules for classification: 1) Points; 2) Matches won; 3) Goal difference; 4) Goals scored; 5) Head-to-head points; 6) Head-to-head goal difference; 7) Fair play ranking; 8) Drawing of lots.

==== Results summary ====
Overall								Home						Away					
Pld	W	D	L	GF	GA	GD	Pts	W	D	L	GF	GA	GD	W	D	L	GF	GA	GD
33	12	8	13	43	62	−19	44	7	4	6	22	28	−6	5	4	7	21	34	−13

Source: Hungarian Football Federation

==== Results by round ====
Round	1	2	3	4	5	6	7	8	9	10	11	12	13	14	15	16	17	18	19	20	21	22	23	24	25	26	27	28	29	30	31	32	33
Ground	H	A	H	H	A	H	A	H	A	H	A	A	H	A	A	H	A	H	A	H	A	H	H	A	H	H	A	H	A	H	A	H	A
Result	D	L	D	W	W	W	W	L	L	L	L	D	W	L	W	W	D	W	L	L	L	W	L	D	W	D	W	D	W	L	L	L	D
Position	6	10	10	7	5	3	2	4	6	7	8	9	9	9	6	6	6	4	5	6	7	6	6	8	7	6	6	6	5	6	6	8	8
Points	1	1	2	5	8	11	14	14	14	14	14	15	18	18	21	24	25	28	28	28	28	31	31	32	35	36	39	40	43	43	43	43	44

Source: Matches
A = Away; H = Home; W = Win; D = Draw; L = Loss

==== Matches ====
28 July 2023 1	MTK	1–1	Paks	Budapest
20:00 CEST (UTC+2)	Kata (yellow card) 38'; Bobál (yellow card) 43'; Németh 49'; Hey (yellow card) 75'	Report	Papp (yellow card) 3'; Böde 65'; Bőle (yellow card) 69'; Vas (yellow card) 77'	Stadium: Hidegkuti Nándor Stadion; Attendance: 2,223; Referee: Ádám Farkas

6 August 2023 2	Zalaegerszeg	2–1	MTK	Zalaegerszeg
20:00 CEST (UTC+2)	Sajbán 3'; Safronov (yellow card) 15'; Tajti 45+4' (pen.)	Report	Németh 32'; Zsóri (yellow card) 65'; Kosznovszky (yellow card) 90+4'; Kádár (yellow card) 90+10'	Stadium: ZTE Arena; Attendance: 1,823; Referee: Dr Bence Csonka

11 August 2023 3	MTK	0–0	Kisvárda	Budapest
20:00 CEST (UTC+2)		Report		Stadium: Hidegkuti Nándor Stadion; Attendance: 1,979; Referee: Márton Rúsz

19 August 2023 4	MTK	1–0	Kecskemét	Budapest
17:45 CEST (UTC+2)	Kata (yellow card) 15'; Zsóri (yellow card) 45+2'; A. Horváth (yellow card) 67'; Hey 84'	Report	O. Nagy (yellow card) 69'	Stadium: Hidegkuti Nándor Stadion; Attendance: 2,319; Referee: Ádám Pillók

27 August 2023 5	Debrecen	1–3	MTK	Debrecen
15:30 CEST (UTC+2)	Bárány 7'; Domingues (yellow card) 88'	Report	Bobál 10', (yellow card) 66'; Bognár 13'; Hey (yellow card) 23'; Németh 63'; Kádár (yellow card) 85'	Stadium: Nagyerdei Stadion; Attendance: 4,144; Referee: Ferenc Karakó

2 September 2023 6	MTK	2–1	Diósgyőr	Budapest
15:15 CEST (UTC+2)	Kata 5'; Hey (yellow card) 38'; Bognár 57'; Zsóri (yellow card) 90+4'	Report	Bárdos (yellow card) 21'; Vallejo 60'	Stadium: Hidegkuti Nándor Stadion; Attendance: 3,679; Referee: Péter Antal

23 September 2023 7	Újpest	0–2	MTK	Budapest
19:30 CEST (UTC+2)	Ganea (yellow card) 87'	Report	Bognár 25'; Végh (yellow card) 49'; Kata (yellow card) 50'; Németh 72'	Stadium: Szusza Ferenc Stadion; Attendance: 4,561; Referee: Márton Rúsz

30 September 2023 8	MTK	1–6	Ferencváros	Budapest
17:00 CEST (UTC+2)	Bognár 10'; Kata (yellow card) 46'	Report	B. Varga 23'; Marquinhos 41', 55'; Makreckis (yellow card) 58'; Wingo 63'; Abu Fani 86'; Pešić 90+2'	Stadium: Hidegkuti Nándor Stadion; Attendance: 5,322; Referee: Balázs Berke

8 October 2023 9	Fehérvár	3–0	MTK	Székesfehérvár
13:00 CEST (UTC+2)	Fiola (yellow card) 34'; Serafimov (yellow card) 40'; Katona 45+1'; Kalmár 54', 89'; Gergényi (yellow card) 68'	Report	Kádár (red card) 20'; Thiam (red card) 43'	Stadium: Sóstói Stadion; Attendance: 3,136; Referee: Gergő Bogár

22 October 2023 10	MTK	0–5	Puskás Akadémia	Budapest
13:15 CEST (UTC+2)	Stieber (yellow card) 48'	Report	Batik 10'; Gruber 38'; Corbu (yellow card) 58', (goal) 65'; Nagy 74'; Favorov 90+1'	Stadium: Hidegkuti Nándor Stadion; Attendance: 2,625; Referee: Péter Antal

29 October 2023 11	Mezőkövesd	1–0	MTK	Mezőkövesd
13:15 CET (UTC+1)	G. Molnár 7'; Babunski (yellow card) 34'; Dražić (yellow card) 85'; Piscitelli (yellow card) 87'	Report	Hey (yellow card) 40'; Kosznovszky (yellow card) 56'; Bognár (yellow card) 63'	Stadium: Városi Stadion; Attendance: 1,791; Referee: Sándor Andó-Szabó

5 November 2023 12	Paks	0–0	MTK	Paks
18:30 CET (UTC+1)	Hahn (yellow card) 52'	Report	Kata (yellow card) 61'; Bognár (yellow card) 69'	Stadium: Fehérvári úti Stadion; Attendance: 1,824; Referee: István Vad

10 November 2023 13	MTK	2–0	Zalaegerszeg	Budapest
20:00 CET (UTC+1)	M. Kovács (yellow card) 17'; Kocsis 60'; Thiam 78'	Report	Huszti (yellow card) 44'	Stadium: Hidegkuti Nándor Stadion; Attendance: 1,923; Referee: Mihály Káprály

25 November 2023 14	Kisvárda	3–1	MTK	Kisvárda
14:45 CET (UTC+1)	Széles 21'; Cipetić 56' (pen.); Melnyk (yellow card) 61'; Czékus 90+5'	Report	Antonov (yellow card) 29'; Stieber 69', (yellow card) 76'; Kosznovszky (yellow card) 81'	Stadium: Várkerti Stadion; Attendance: 1,890; Referee: József Erdős

2 December 2023 15	Kecskemét	1–2	MTK	Kecskemét
13:00 CET (UTC+1)	Zeke (yellow card) 17'; K. Horváth (yellow card) 32', (goal) 45+1' (pen.)	Report	Antonov 13' (pen.), 61' (pen.); Thiam (yellow card) 22'; Végh (yellow card) 29'; Bognár (yellow card) 32'; Varju (yellow card) 64'; Hey (yellow card) 78'; Németh (yellow card) 90'	Stadium: Széktói Stadion; Attendance: 1,824; Referee: Márton Rúsz

9 December 2023 16	MTK	2–1	Debrecen	Budapest
13:15 CET (UTC+1)	Thiam 34'; Stieber 83'	Report	Szécsi 50'; Lagator (yellow card) 57'; Manrique (yellow card) 76'	Stadium: Hidegkuti Nándor Stadion; Attendance: 2,021; Referee: Tamás Bognár

16 December 2023 17	Diósgyőr	3–3	MTK	Miskolc
17:30 CET (UTC+1)	Edomwonyi (yellow card) 28'; Chorbadzhiyski (yellow card) 31'; Szatmári 33', (yellow card) 84'; Holdampf (yellow card) 47'; Hey 77' (o.g.); Franchu 79'	Report	Stieber 19'; Kocsis (yellow card) 28'; Varju (yellow card) 42'; Antonov 64'; Végh 82'	Stadium: Diósgyőri Stadion; Attendance: 3,412; Referee: Csaba Pintér

2 February 2024 18	MTK	3–0	Újpest	Budapest
20:00 CET (UTC+1)	Hey 20'; Jurina 36'; Németh (yellow card) 54'; Kocsis 58'	Report	Hall (yellow card) 15'; Mörschel (yellow card) 54'; Radošević (yellow card) 85'	Stadium: Hidegkuti Nándor Stadion; Attendance: 3,525; Referee: József Erdős

6 February 2024 19	Ferencváros	5–1	MTK	Budapest
20:00 CET (UTC+1)	B. Varga 21', 52', 53', 56'; Lončar 66'; Bešić (yellow card) 87'	Report	Bognár 32'; Špalek (yellow card) 69'	Stadium: Groupama Arena; Attendance: 7,014; Referee: Gergő Bogár

10 February 2024 20	MTK	0–2	Fehérvár	Budapest
15:00 CET (UTC+1)	Kata (yellow card) 20'; Hey (yellow card) 73'	Report	T. Tóth 15'; Stefanelli 25'	Stadium: Hidegkuti Nándor Stadion; Attendance: 2,839; Referee: Ferenc Karakó

18 February 2024 21	Puskás Akadémia	6–1	MTK	Felcsút
17:60 CET (UTC+1)	Zsolt Nagy 12', (yellow card) 42'; Stronati (yellow card) 20', (goal) 80'; Corbu 25'; Favorov 45+2'; Komáromi 54'; Maceiras (yellow card) 77'; Soisalo 90+2'	Report	Molnár 65'; Végh (red card) 82'; Hey (yellow card) 86'	Stadium: Pancho Aréna; Attendance: 1,231; Referee: Tamás Bognár

23 February 2024 22	MTK	3–1	Mezőkövesd	Budapest
20:00 CET (UTC+1)	Németh 45+1', 70'; Antonov 48'; Varju (yellow card) 72'	Report	Cseke 7'; Beriashvili (yellow card) 63'	Stadium: Hidegkuti Nándor Stadion; Attendance: 1,734; Referee: István Vad

3 March 2024 23	MTK	0–2	Paks	Budapest
14:00 CET (UTC+1)	Hey (yellow card) 3'; Kata (yellow card) 56'	Report	J. Szabó (yellow card) 38'; Böde 72', 87'; B. Szabó (yellow card) 90+2'	Stadium: Hidegkuti Nándor Stadion; Attendance: 2,483; Referee: Mihály Káprály

10 March 2024 24	Zalaegerszeg	2–2	MTK	Zalaegerszeg
20:00 CET (UTC+1)	Csóka 52'; Gruber 54'; Márton (manager) (yellow card) 81'	Report	Bognár 26', 34'; Varju (yellow card) 28'; Molnár (yellow card) 68'	Stadium: ZTE Arena; Attendance: 2,124; Referee: Márton Rúsz

17 March 2024 25	MTK	2–1	Kisvárda	Budapest
17:30 CET (UTC+1)	Jurina (yellow card) 6'; Molnár 17'; Bognár 34' (pen.)	Report	Jovičić (yellow card) 40', (goal) 86'; Navrátil (yellow card) 49'; Lippai (yellow card) 79'	Stadium: Hidegkuti Nándor Stadion; Attendance: 1,938; Referee: Csaba Pintér

30 March 2024 26	MTK	2–2	Kecskemét	Budapest
17:00 CET (UTC+1)	Hey 41'; Molnár 50', (yellow card) 70'	Report	Szendrei 35', (yellow card) 36'; Helmich 87'	Stadium: Hidegkuti Nándor Stadion; Attendance: 2,228; Referee: Mihály Káprály

6 April 2024 27	Debrecen	1–2	MTK	Debrecen
19:30 CEST (UTC+2)	Bárány 56'; Drešković (yellow card) 84'; Dzsudzsák (yellow card) 86'; Lončar (yellow card) 90+4'	Report	Kosznovszky 16'; Kocsis (yellow card) 24'; Horváth 50'; Jurina (yellow card) 84'; Varju (yellow card) 86'; Hey (yellow card) 90+4'; Nagy (yellow card) 90+9'	Stadium: Nagyerdei Stadion; Attendance: 5,221; Referee: József Erdős

14 April 2024 28	MTK	1–1	Diósgyőr	Budapest
14:00 CEST (UTC+2)	Bognár 31'; Kocsis (yellow card) 43'; P. Kovács I (yellow card) 47'	Report	Franchu (yellow card) 74'; Pernambuco 85'	Stadium: Hidegkuti Nándor Stadion; Attendance: 3,739; Referee: István Vad

21 April 2024 29	Újpest	1–2	MTK	Budapest
18:30 CEST (UTC+2)	Csoboth 20'; Ljujić (yellow card) 35'; Huszti (yellow card) 57'; Kobouri (yellow card) 90+3'	Report	Kádár (yellow card) 64'; Jurina 79', 90+7', (yellow card) 90+7'; P. Kovács I (yellow card) 90+2'	Stadium: Szusza Ferenc Stadion; Attendance: 3,276; Referee: Péter Antal

28 April 2024 30	MTK	1–2	Ferencváros	Budapest
17:45 CEST (UTC+2)	Németh 31', (yellow card) 48'; Kocsis (yellow card) 45'; Kata (yellow card) 47'; Antonov (yellow card) 72'	Report	Kodro 27'; Lisztes 45+3'	Stadium: Hidegkuti Nándor Stadion; Attendance: 4,638; Referee: Dr Bence Csonka

3 May 2024 31	Fehérvár	4–0	MTK	Székesfehérvár
20:00 CEST (UTC+2)	Katona 23'; Christensen 32'; Csongvai 40'; Pető 77'	Report	Kádár (red card) 10'	Stadium: Sóstói Stadion; Attendance: 3,104; Referee: József Erdős

11 May 2024 32	MTK	1–3	Puskás Akadémia	Budapest
15:30 CEST (UTC+2)	Bognár (yellow card) 27'; Zsombor Nagy 37'	Report	Szolnoki 5'; Nissilä 12', 20'; Maceiras (yellow card) 27'; Colley (yellow card) 78'; Golla (yellow card) 89'	Stadium: Hidegkuti Nándor Stadion; Attendance: 2,562; Referee: Ferenc Karakó

17 May 2024 33	Mezőkövesd	1–1	MTK	Mezőkövesd
20:30 CEST (UTC+2)	Szolgai (yellow card) 56'; Kállai (yellow card) 84', (goal) 90+1'	Report	Németh 4'; Horváth (yellow card) 28'; Varju (yellow card) 36'; Hey (yellow card) 37'; Jurina (yellow card) 90'	Stadium: Városi Stadion; Attendance: 700; Referee: Marcell Derdák

=== Magyar Kupa ===
17 September 2023 Round of 64	Gesztely	1–6	MTK	Gesztely
13:00 CEST (UTC+2)	Porkoláb 9'	Report	Molnár 1', 73', 79'; Stieber 60'; P. Kovács I 81', 90'	Stadium: Tóth-Zele József Sportközpont; Attendance: 1,500; Referee: Ákos Takács

1 November 2023 Round of 32	ESMTK	0–4	MTK	Budapest
12:30 CET (UTC+1)		Report	Antonov 33'; Stieber 35'; Zsóri 65'; P. Kovács I 90+3'	Stadium: ESMTK Stadion; Attendance: 1,000; Referee: Márton Rúsz

28 February 2024 Round of 16	Kozármisleny	0–3	MTK	Kozármisleny
17:00 CET (UTC+1)	Turi (yellow card) 38'; Bor (yellow card) 90+1'; Ikonomou (yellow card) 90+3'	Report	Jurina 9', 35', (yellow card) 38'; Antonov 48'; Thiam (yellow card) 75'	Stadium: Kozármislenyi Stadion; Attendance: 800; Referee: Gergely Bana

2 April 2024 Quarter-finals	Kisvárda	3–2	MTK	Kisvárda
20:00 CEST (UTC+2)	Jovičić 8', 90'; Spasić 21'; Makowski (yellow card) 22'; Cipetić (yellow card) 90+5'; Feczkó (manager) (yellow card) 90+5'	Report	Bognár 59'; Hey 87'; P. Kovács I (yellow card) 90+5'	Stadium: Várkerti Stadion; Attendance: 800; Referee: Gergő Bogár

== Statistics ==
=== Overall ===
Appearances (Apps) numbers are for appearances in competitive games only, including sub appearances.
Source: Competitions

No.	Player	Pos.	Nemzeti Bajnokság I				Magyar Kupa				Total			
No.	Player	Pos.	Apps	Goal	Booked	Sent off (straight red)	Apps	Goal	Booked	Sent off (straight red)	Apps	Goal	Booked	Sent off (straight red)
1	(Hungary) Patrik Demjén	GK	30								30			
2	(Hungary) Benedek Varju	DF	25	1	5		3				28	1	5	
3	(Serbia) Nemanja Antonov	DF	28	3	3		4	2			32	5	3	
4	(Hungary) Dávid Bobál	DF	10	1	2						10	1	2	
5	(Hungary) Zsombor Nagy	DF	12	1	1		2				14	1	1	
6	(Hungary) Mihály Kata	MF	31	1	8		2				33	1	8	
7	(Hungary) Zoltán Stieber	MF	27	3	2		4	2			31	5	2	
8	(Hungary) Dániel Zsóri	FW	10		3		2	1			12	1	3	
9	(Canada) Richie Ennin	FW	6								6			
10	(Hungary) István Bognár	MF	33	9	4		2	1			35	10	4	
11	(Bosnia and Herzegovina) Marin Jurina	FW	15	3	4		2	2	1		17	5	5	
11	(Hungary) Ákos Zuigéber	FW	5				2				7			
13	(Hungary) Gergő Rácz	GK	3				4				7			
14	(Hungary) Artúr Horváth	MF	17	1	2						17	1	2	
15	(Hungary) Márk Kosznovszky	MF	18	1	3		3				21	1	3	
16	(Hungary) Bence Végh	MF	24	1	2	1	3				27	1	2	1
17	(Ghana) Christian Anokye	DF												
17	(Slovakia) Nikolas Špalek	FW	11		1		2				13		1	
18	(Hungary) Krisztián Németh	FW	23	8	3		1				24	8	3	
20	(Hungary) Mátyás Kovács	FW	25		1		3				28		1	
21	(Hungary) Gergő Kocsis	MF	26	2	4		2				28	2	4	
22	(Ukraine) Viktor Hey	DF	32	3	10		2	1			34	4	10	
23	(Senegal) Khaly Thiam	MF	20	2	1	1	2		1		22	2	2	1
24	(Hungary) Dániel Vadnai	DF	5				3				8			
25	(Hungary) Tamás Kádár	DF	30		3	2	3				33		3	2
27	(Hungary) Patrik Kovács	DF	18		2		3	3	1		21	3	3	
28	(Hungary) Ádám Miknyóczki	FW	1				2				3			
29	(Hungary) Rajmund Molnár	FW	19	3	2		2	3			21	6	2	
30	(Hungary) Barnabás Biben	MF	1				2				3			
30	(Hungary) Bence Várkonyi	DF	1								1			
32	(Hungary) József Balázs	GK												
33	(Hungary) Gábor Stumpf	DF												
34	(Hungary) Noel Kenesei	MF	1								1			
Own goals														
Totals				43	66	4		15	3			58	69	4

=== Hat-tricks ===
No.	Player	Against	Result	Date	Competition
29	(Hungary) Rajmund Molnár	Gesztely	6–1	17 September 2023	Magyar Kupa

=== Clean sheets ===
			Clean sheets		
No.	Player	Games Played	Nemzeti Bajnokság I	Magyar Kupa	Total
1	(Hungary) Patrik Demjén	30	6		6
13	(Hungary) Gergő Rácz	7	0	2	2
32	(Hungary) József Balázs	0			0
Totals			6	2	8
