= 2024–25 MTK Budapest FC season =

MTK
2024–25 season
- Manager: Dávid Horváth
- Stadium: Hidegkuti Nándor Stadion
- Nemzeti Bajnokság I: 5th
- Magyar Kupa: Semi-finals
- Top goalscorer: League: Marin Jurina (13); All: Marin Jurina (14)
- Highest home attendance: 4,831 v Ferencváros (Ferencváros, Nemzeti Bajnokság I)
- Lowest home attendance: 1,517 v Paks (3 December 2024, Nemzeti Bajnokság I)
- Average home league attendance: 2,956
- Biggest win: 4–0 v Diósgyőr (Home, 21 February 2025, Nemzeti Bajnokság I); 5–1 v Újpest (Away, 1 March 2025, Nemzeti Bajnokság I)
- Biggest defeat: 0–5 v Kecskemét (Away, 15 February 2025, Nemzeti Bajnokság I)
Home colours	Away colours	Third colours

The 2024–25 season was Magyar Testgyakorlók Köre Budapest Futball Club's 113th competitive season, 2nd consecutive season in the Nemzeti Bajnokság I and 120th season in existence as a football club. In addition to the domestic league, MTK participated in that season's editions of the Magyar Kupa.

== Squad ==
Squad at end of season

Note: Flags indicate national team as defined under FIFA eligibility rules; some limited exceptions apply. Players may hold more than one non-FIFA nationality.

No.	Pos.	Nation	Player
1	GK	HUN	Patrik Demjén
2	DF	HUN	Benedek Varju
4	DF	HUN	Dávid Bobál
5	DF	HUN	Zsombor Nagy
6	MF	HUN	Mihály Kata
7	FW	HUN	Zoltán Stieber
8	MF	HUN	Márk Kosznovszky
9	FW	HUN	Rajmund Molnár
10	MF	HUN	István Bognár
11	FW	BIH	Marin Jurina
12	GK	HUN	Adrián Csenterics
14	MF	HUN	Artúr Horváth
16	MF	HUN	Bence Végh

No.	Pos.	Nation	Player
17	FW	SVK	Róbert Polievka
18	FW	HUN	Krisztián Németh
20	MF	HUN	Sámuel Bakó
22	DF	UKR	Viktor Hey
23	FW	HUN	Ádin Molnár
24	DF	GEO	Ilia Beriashvili
25	DF	HUN	Tamás Kádár
26	MF	HUN	Gergő Szőke
27	DF	HUN	Patrik Kovács
28	FW	HUN	Noel Kenesei
29	GK	HUN	József Balázs
30	FW	HUN	Zsombor Gruber
31	MF	HUN	Domonkos Bene

== Transfers ==
=== Transfers in ===
Transfer window	Pos.	No.	Player	From
Summer	–	–	(Hungary) Kristóf Feyer	(Hungary) Youth team
Summer	–	FW	(Hungary) Péter Molnár	(Hungary) Youth team
Summer	–	GK	(Hungary) Dávid Szolár	(Hungary) Youth team
Summer	FW	9	(Hungary) Rajmund Molnár	(Hungary) Haladás
Summer	FW	17	(Slovakia) Róbert Polievka	(Slovakia) Dukla Banská Bystrica
Summer	DF	24	(Georgia (country)) Ilia Beriashvili	(Hungary) Mezőkövesd
Summer	FW	36	(Hungary) Zoltán Csucsánszky	Youth team

=== Transfers out ===
Transfer window	Pos.	No.	Player	To
Summer	FW	8	(Hungary) Dániel Zsóri	Released (Note: Joined UTA Arad.)
Summer	FW	9	(Canada) Richie Ennin	Released
Summer	FW	17	(Slovakia) Nikolas Špalek	(Slovakia) Komárno
Summer	MF	21	(Hungary) Gergő Kocsis	Released (Note: Joined Debrecen.)
Summer	MF	23	(Hungary) Khaly Thiam	Released
Summer	DF	24	(Hungary) Dániel Vadnai	Released
Summer	FW	28	(Hungary) Ádám Miknyóczki	(Hungary) Gyirmót
Summer	MF	30	(Hungary) Barnabás Biben	Released (Note: Joined Szeged.)
Summer	DF	30	(Hungary) Bence Várkonyi	(Hungary) Zalaegerszeg
Winter	GK	13	(Hungary) Gergő Rácz	Released (Note: Joined Honvéd.)

=== Loans in ===
Transfer window	Pos.	No.	Player	From	End date
Winter	FW	30	(Hungary) Zsombor Gruber	(Hungary) Ferencváros	Middle of season

=== Loans out ===
Transfer window	Pos.	No.	Player	To	End date
Summer	MF	–	(Hungary) Ádám Merényi	(Hungary) Budafok	End of season
Summer	FW	11	(Hungary) Ákos Zuigéber	(Hungary) Budafok	End of season
Summer	DF	13	(Hungary) Roland Lehoczky	(Hungary) Vasas	End of season
Summer	FW	20	(Hungary) Mátyás Kovács	(Hungary) Fehérvár	End of season
Winter	FW	–	(Hungary) Botond Herczeg	(Hungary) Szeged	End of season

== Competitions ==
=== Overview ===
Competition	First match	Last match	Starting round	Final position	Record							
Competition	First match	Last match	Starting round	Final position	Pld	W	D	L	GF	GA	GD	Win %
Nemzeti Bajnokság I	26 July 2024	24 May 2025	Matchday 1	5th	33	13	7	13	53	47	+6	39.39
Magyar Kupa	14 September 2024	23 April 2025	Round of 64	Semi-finals	5	4	0	1	12	5	+7	80.00
Total					38	17	7	14	65	52	+13	44.74

Source: Competitions

=== Nemzeti Bajnokság I ===
==== League table ====
Pos	Team	Pld	W	D	L	GF	GA	GD	Pts	Qualification or relegation
3	Paks	33	16	9	8	65	47	+18	57	Qualification for the Europa League first qualifying round (Note: Paks qualified for the Europa League as the 2024–25 Magyar Kupa winners. As a result, the second Conference League berth was passed to the team in 4th place.)
4	Győr	33	14	11	8	49	37	+12	53	Qualification for the Conference League second qualifying round
5	MTK	33	13	7	13	53	47	+6	46	
6	Diósgyőr	33	11	11	11	43	51	−8	44	
7	Újpest	33	9	14	10	38	44	−6	41	

Source: Hungarian Football Federation (in Hungarian)
Rules for classification: 1) Points; 2) Matches won; 3) Goal difference; 4) Goals scored; 5) Head-to-head points; 6) Head-to-head goal difference; 7) Fair play ranking; 8) Drawing of lots.

==== Results summary ====
Overall								Home						Away					
Pld	W	D	L	GF	GA	GD	Pts	W	D	L	GF	GA	GD	W	D	L	GF	GA	GD
33	13	7	13	53	47	+6	46	8	2	6	33	23	+10	5	5	7	20	24	−4

Source: Hungarian Football Federation

==== Results by round ====
Round	1	2	3	4	5	6	7	8	9	10	11	12	13	14	15	16	17	18	19	20	21	22	23	24	25	26	27	28	29	30	31	32	33
Ground	A	H	A	A	H	A	H	A	H	A	H	H	A	H	H	A	H	A	H	A	H	A	A	H	A	A	H	A	H	A	H	A	H
Result	W	W	W	L	W	L	L	W	W	W	W	D	L	D	L	L	W	D	L	L	W	W	D	W	L	D	L	D	L	D	W	L	L
Position	4	2	1	2	2	3	3	3	3	3	2	2	3	3	3	5	4	4	5	5	4	4	4	4	4	4	4	5	5	5	5	5	5
Points	3	6	9	9	12	12	12	15	18	21	24	25	25	26	26	26	29	30	30	30	33	36	37	40	40	41	41	42	42	43	46	46	46

Source: Matches
A = Away; H = Home; W = Win; D = Draw; L = Loss

==== Matches ====
26 July 2024 1	Zalaegerszeg	0–1	MTK	Zalaegerszeg
18:00 CEST (UTC+2)	Várkonyi (yellow card) 61'; Croizet (yellow card) 81'	Report	Antonov (yellow card) 56'; Jurina 90+2', (yellow card) 90+5'	Stadium: ZTE Arena; Attendance: 2,867; Referee: Mihály Káprály; Assistant referees: István Albert, Gergő Vígh-Tarsonyi; Fourth official: Ádám Pillók

3 August 2024 2	MTK	3–0	Nyíregyháza	Budapest
19:45 CEST (UTC+2)	Beriashvili 24'; Stieber 77', 90+5' (pen.)	Report	Gengeliczki (yellow card) 57'; Fejér (yellow card) 90+4'	Stadium: Hidegkuti Nándor Stadion; Attendance: 2,729; Referee: Marcell Derdák; Assistant referees: Péter Garai, Péter Ország; Fourth official: Tamás Bognár

11 August 2024 3	Győr	1–2	MTK	Győr
15:45 CEST (UTC+2)	Lukić 2'; Vera (yellow card) 53'; Boldor (yellow card) 90+3'; Borbély (manager) (yellow card) 90+9'	Report	I. Bognár 38' (pen.), 54' (pen.); P. Kovács I (yellow card) 45'; Varju (yellow card) 84'; Demjén (yellow card) 90+4'	Stadium: ETO Park; Attendance: 3,420; Referee: Márton Rúsz; Assistant referees: Balázs Szalai, Gergely Becséri; Fourth official: Ferenc Karakó

18 August 2024 4	Puskás Akadémia	1–0	MTK	Felcsút
20:00 CEST (UTC+2)	Favorov (yellow card) 19'; Golla (yellow card) 47'; Levi 51'	Report	Kata (yellow card) 36'; Hey (yellow card) 45'; Kosznovszky (yellow card) 58'; Beriashvili (yellow card) 85'	Stadium: Pancho Aréna; Attendance: 1,218; Referee: Ferenc Karakó; Assistant referees: Vencel Tóth II, Ákos Berényi; Fourth official: Balázs Berke

30 August 2024 6	Fehérvár	1–0	MTK	Székesfehérvár
20:00 CEST (UTC+2)	Gradišar 45+1'	Report	Varju (yellow card) 42'; Á. Molnár (yellow card) 86'	Stadium: Sóstói Stadion; Attendance: 3,014; Referee: Imre Kovács; Assistant referees: Gergő Vígh-Tarsonyi, István Szécsényi; Fourth official: Péter Zierkelbach

20 September 2024 7	MTK	1–3	Ferencváros	Budapest
20:00 CEST (UTC+2)	Hey (yellow card) 5'; I. Bognár 18' (pen.)	Report	Ramírez (yellow card) 16'; B. Varga 25'; Raul Gustavo 44'; Ben Romdhane (yellow card) 61'; Saldanha 80'	Stadium: Hidegkuti Nándor Stadion; Attendance: 4,815; Referee: Ferenc Karakó; Assistant referees: Balázs Buzás, Bence Péter Belicza; Fourth official: Ádám Pillók

28 September 2024 8	Debrecen	2–3	MTK	Debrecen
19:30 CEST (UTC+2)	Stojković (yellow card) 26'; D. Kocsis 41'; Szűcs 76'; Domingues (yellow card) 81'	Report	Jurina 33'; Kata (yellow card) 40'; I. Bognár 59'; Kádár (yellow card) 73'; Varju (red card) 81'; Hey 85'	Stadium: Nagyerdei Stadion; Attendance: 5,321; Referee: Csaba Pintér; Assistant referees: Péter Kóbor, Dávid Rózsa; Fourth official: Márton Rúsz

5 October 2024 9	MTK	3–1	Kecskemét	Budapest
17:00 CEST (UTC+2)	Kosznovszky 18'; R. Molnár 22'; Beriashvili 87'	Report	Lukács 13', (yellow card) 54'; L. Katona (yellow card) 40'; Vágó (yellow card) 63'; K. Nagy (yellow card) 68'	Stadium: Hidegkuti Nándor Stadion; Attendance: 2,432; Referee: Mihály Káprály; Assistant referees: Balázs Szert, Balázs Buzás; Fourth official: Balázs Berke

19 October 2024 10	Diósgyőr	0–2	MTK	Miskolc
17:30 CEST (UTC+2)		Report	Kosznovszky 2', (yellow card) 84'; R. Molnár 42'; Jurina (yellow card) 73'	Stadium: Diósgyőri Stadion; Attendance: 5,405; Referee: Marcell Derdák; Assistant referees: Péter Kóbor, Balázs Szalai; Fourth official: Mihály Káprály

26 October 2024 11	MTK	4–1	Újpest	Budapest
20:45 CEST (UTC+2)	Jurina 16'; Beriashvili (yellow card) 48'; Duarte 56' (o.g.); Kosznovszky 66'; Á. Molnár 71'	Report	Má. Mucsányi 2'; Kr. Horváth (yellow card) 73'; Brodić (yellow card) 74'	Stadium: Hidegkuti Nándor Stadion; Attendance: 4,035; Referee: Pétel Antal; Assistant referees: Gergő Vígh-Tarsonyi, Balázs Szert; Fourth official: Mihály Káprály

2 November 2024 12	MTK	1–1	Zalaegerszeg	Budapest
12:30 CET (UTC+1)	I. Bognár (yellow card) 45'; Kosznovszky (yellow card) 69'; Németh 87'	Report	Croizet 10'; Evangelou (yellow card) 64'	Stadium: Hidegkuti Nándor Stadion; Attendance: 2,365; Referee: Péter Zierkelbach; Assistant referees: Balázs Szalai, Róbert Horváth; Fourth official: Csaba Pintér

8 November 2024 13	Nyíregyháza	2–0	MTK	Nyíregyháza
20:00 CET (UTC+1)	Kvekveskiri (yellow card) 12'; D. Nagy 32', (yellow card) 88'; Kovácsréti 40' (pen.); Baki (yellow card) 90'	Report	Stieber (yellow card) 82'	Stadium: Városi Stadion; Attendance: 5,013; Referee: Ádám Pillók; Assistant referees: Gergely Becséri, Dávid Rózsa; Fourth official: Imre Kovács

23 November 2024 14	MTK	2–2	Győr	Budapest
16:00 CET (UTC+1)	Kata (yellow card) 23'; Jurina 27'; R. Molnár (yellow card) 60'; Varju (yellow card) 66', (goal) 73'; I. Bognár (yellow card) 90+3'	Report	Bitri 63'; Bumba 68'; Ouro (yellow card) 81'	Stadium: Hidegkuti Nándor Stadion; Attendance: 2,500; Referee: Marcell Derdák; Assistant referees: Georgiou Theodoros, Bence Péter Belicza; Fourth official: József Erdős

30 November 2024 15	MTK	0–1	Puskás Akadémia	Budapest
12:30 CET (UTC+1)	P. Kovács I (yellow card) 36'; Varju (yellow card) 42'; Németh (red card) 90+5'	Report	Markgráf (yellow card) 11'; Szolnoki (yellow card) 51'; Zsol. Nagy 75' (pen.); Maceiras (yellow card) 76'	Stadium: Hidegkuti Nándor Stadion; Attendance: 1,935; Referee: Imre Kovács; Assistant referees: István Albert, Zoltán Horváth; Fourth official: Eszter Urbán

3 December 2024 5	MTK	3–1	Paks	Budapest
19:00 CET (UTC+1)	Jurina 15'; Kata (yellow card) 46'; Hey 68'; Varju 78', (yellow card) 88'	Report	B. Tóth 17'; Vécsei (yellow card) 53'	Stadium: Hidegkuti Nándor Stadion; Attendance: 1,517; Referee: Ferenc Karakó; Assistant referees: Georgiou Theodoros, Balázs Szert; Fourth official: Sándor Andó-Szabó

7 December 2024 16	Paks	4–2	MTK	Paks
19:15 CET (UTC+1)	B. Tóth 9'; Kinyik (yellow card) 20'; Vas (yellow card) 56'; Böde 63', 66'; Windecker 73'	Report	Kata (yellow card) 7'; Jurina 15', 39'; Antonov (yellow card) 27'; R. Molnár (yellow card) 32'; P. Kovács I (yellow card) 71'; Kádár (yellow card) 87'	Stadium: Fehérvári úti Stadion; Attendance: 1,601; Referee: Mihály Káprály; Assistant referees: Gergely Becséri, Dávid Rózsa; Fourth official: Péter Antal

14 December 2024 17	MTK	3–2	Fehérvár	Budapest
12:00 CET (UTC+1)	Stieber (yellow card) 23'; Végh 27'; Á. Molnár (yellow card) 58'; Kosznovszky (yellow card) 61'; Jurina 86'; R. Molnár 90+7' (pen.), (yellow card) 90+7'	Report	Gradišar 2'; B. Szabó 68'; Holender (yellow card) 74'; Simut (yellow card) 80'; Spandler (yellow card) 82'; G. Nagy (yellow card) 90+5'	Stadium: Hidegkuti Nándor Stadion; Attendance: 2,051; Referee: Sándor Andó-Szabó; Assistant referees: István Albert, Balázs Buzás; Fourth official: Balázs Berke

2 February 2025 18	Ferencváros	0–0	MTK	Budapest
20:15 CET (UTC+1)		Report	Kádár (yellow card) 65'	Stadium: Groupama Arena; Attendance: 6,695; Referee: Balázs Berke; Assistant referees: István Albert, Péter Kóbor; Fourth official: Péter Zierkelbach

7 February 2025 19	MTK	0–2	Debrecen	Budapest
20:00 CET (UTC+1)	R. Molnár (yellow card) 47'; Bobál (yellow card) 62'; Á. Molnár (red card) 73'	Report	Vajda (yellow card) 17'; Domingues 29' (yellow card) 61'; Szűcs 69'	Stadium: Hidegkuti Nándor Stadion; Attendance: 2,389; Referee: István Vad; Assistant referees: Péter Kóbor, Péter Garai; Fourth official: Imre Kovács

15 February 2025 20	Kecskemét	5–0	MTK	Kecskemét
14:30 CET (UTC+1)	B. Katona 19', 69'; Zeke 27'; Májer 45+1'; Camaj 87'	Report	Kata (yellow card) 80'; Bobál (yellow card) 90+1'; Kosznovszky (yellow card) 90+3'	Stadium: Széktói Stadion; Attendance: 1,543; Referee: Tamás Bognár; Assistant referees: Zoltán Horváth, Bence Péter Belicza; Fourth official: József Erdős

21 February 2025 21	MTK	4–0	Diósgyőr	Budapest
20:00 CET (UTC+1)	P. Kovács I 26'; Jurina 41'; Kádár 58'; Varju 78'	Report	Gera (yellow card) 50'	Stadium: Hidegkuti Nándor Stadion; Attendance: 2,761; Referee: Marcell Derdák; Assistant referees: Gergő Vígh-Tarsonyi, Péter Ország; Fourth official: Mihály Káprály

1 March 2025 22	Újpest	1–5	MTK	Budapest
19:30 CET (UTC+1)	Brodić 56'; Dénes (yellow card) 69'; Dékei (yellow card) 78'	Report	Hey (yellow card) 11'; R. Molnár 38' (pen.); Kosznovszky (yellow card) 52'; Jurina 60'; Gruber 64'; Varju 72'; Kaczvinszki 77' (o.g.); P. Kovács I (yellow card) 87'	Stadium: Szusza Ferenc Stadion; Attendance: 3,702; Referee: Csaba Pintér; Assistant referees: Balázs Szalai, Balázs Szert; Fourth official: Péter Zierkelbach

8 March 2025 23	Zalaegerszeg	1–1	MTK	Zalaegerszeg
17:00 CET (UTC+1)	Croizet 3'; Bakti (yellow card) 54'; Nyíri (yellow card) 62'; Esiti (red card) 76'; Szendrei (yellow card) 85'; Evangelou (yellow card) 90+4'	Report	R. Molnár (yellow card) 40'; P. Kovács I (yellow card) 88'; Polievka 90+1'; Kata (yellow card) 90+3'	Stadium: ZTE Arena; Attendance: 2,616; Referee: Dr. Bence Csonka; Assistant referees: Péter Kóbor, István Szécsényi; Fourth official: Ádám Pillók

16 March 2025 24	MTK	3–0	Nyíregyháza	Budapest
17:15 CET (UTC+1)	A. Horváth 48'; Végh (yellow card) 59'; K. Németh 75'; Varju (yellow card) 89'; Polievka 90+3'	Report	Korrea (yellow card) 26'; Beke (yellow card) 27'; D. Nagy (yellow card) 45'	Stadium: Hidegkuti Nándor Stadion; Attendance: 2,762; Referee: Tamás Bognár; Assistant referees: Gergely Becséri, Dávid Rózsa; Fourth official: Eszter Urbán

29 March 2025 25	Győr	2–1	MTK	Győr
14:30 CET (UTC+1)	Gavrić (yellow card) 28'; Anton 32' (pen.); Bumba 78'	Report	Kata (yellow card) 36'; Kádár (yellow card) 56'; Németh 73'; Beriashvili (yellow card) 88'	Stadium: ETO Park; Attendance: 2,130; Referee: Attila Molnár; Assistant referees: Péter Kóbor, Norbert Bornemissza; Fourth official: Mihály Káprály

6 April 2025 26	Puskás Akadémia	1–1	MTK	Felcsút
16:30 CEST (UTC+2)	Levi 42'; Arutyunyan (yellow card) 80'; Golla (yellow card) 85'	Report	R. Molnár 38'; Kádár (yellow card) 71'	Stadium: Pancho Aréna; Attendance: 700; Referee: Mihály Káprály; Assistant referees: Balázs Szert, Ákos Berényi; Fourth official: Attila Molnár

11 April 2025 27	MTK	1–2	Paks	Budapest
20:30 CEST (UTC+2)	Hey (yellow card) 27'; R. Molnár (yellow card) 36'; Kosznovszky (yellow card) 39'; I. Bognár 75'	Report	B. Tóth 37'; J. Szabó (yellow card) 46'; Böde 77'	Stadium: Hidegkuti Nándor Stadion; Attendance: 3,492; Referee: Ádám Pillók; Assistant referees: István Szécsényi, Dániel Szalai; Fourth official: Katalin Kulcsár

20 April 2025 28	Fehérvár	1–1	MTK	Székesfehérvár
13:15 CEST (UTC+2)	M. Katona (yellow card) 44'; Stefanelli 75'	Report	Kádár (yellow card) 28'; Varju (yellow card) 63'; Jurina 81'	Stadium: Sóstói Stadion; Attendance: 2,521; Referee: Márton Rúsz; Assistant referees: István Albert, Balázs Buzás; Fourth official: Marcell Derdák

27 April 2025 29	MTK	2–3	Ferencváros	Budapest
15:30 CEST (UTC+2)	Kata (yellow card) 44'; Jurina 58'; Polievka 63'; I. Bognár (yellow card) 90+3'	Report	Gartenmann 9'; Szalai 13', (yellow card) 76'; Pešić 39'; Abu Fani (yellow card) 86'	Stadium: Hidegkuti Nándor Stadion; Attendance: 4,831; Referee: Mihály Káprály; Assistant referees: Vencel Tóth II, Zoltán Horváth; Fourth official: Imre Kovács

3 May 2025 30	Debrecen	0–0	MTK	Debrecen
15:30 CEST (UTC+2)	D. Kocsis (yellow card) 90'	Report	P. Kovács I (yellow card) 62'; Kádár (yellow card) 87'; Németh (yellow card) 90'; Végh (yellow card) 90+4'	Stadium: Nagyerdei Stadion; Attendance: 6,534; Referee: Márton Rúsz; Assistant referees: István Albert, Bence Péter Belicza; Fourth official: Ádám Pillók

10 May 2025 31	MTK	2–1	Kecskemét	Budapest
17:45 CEST (UTC+2)	Jurina 36'; Polievka 72'	Report	Pálinkás 52'; Belényesi (yellow card) 65'; Botka (yellow card) 88'	Stadium: Hidegkuti Nándor Stadion; Attendance: 3,822; Referee: Marcell Derdák; Assistant referees: Balázs Huszár, Zoltán Horváth; Fourth official: Attila Molnár

17 May 2025 32	Diósgyőr	2–1	MTK	Miskolc
20:00 CEST (UTC+2)	Rakonjac 49', (yellow card) 90+2'; Kállai 66'; Saničanin (yellow card) 83'; Demeter (yellow card) 88'	Report	A. Horváth (yellow card) 2'; Gruber 17'; Zsom. Nagy (yellow card) 54'	Stadium: Diósgyőri Stadion; Attendance: 4,403; Referee: Ferenc Karakó; Assistant referees: Dániel Szalai, József Aradi; Fourth official: Ádám Pillók

24 May 2025 33	MTK	1–3	Újpest	Budapest
15:00 CEST (UTC+2)	Kata (yellow card) 21'; A. Horváth 27'; Zsom. Nagy (yellow card) 55'; Jurina (yellow card) 79'; Gruber (yellow card) 87'; Kádár (yellow card) 88'	Report	Ljujić 1'; Gergényi (yellow card) 35'; Kr. Horváth 45+1'; Beridze 56'; Brodić (yellow card) 72'; Fiola (yellow card) 79'	Stadium: Hidegkuti Nándor Stadion; Attendance: 2,855; Referee: Katalin Kulcsár; Assistant referees: Zoltán Horváth, Anita Vad; Fourth official: Mihály Káprály

=== Magyar Kupa ===
14 September 2024 Round of 64	Hódmezővásárhely	0–2	MTK	Hódmezővásárhely
15:00 CEST (UTC+2)	Zámbori (yellow card) 21'; Simon (yellow card) 72'	Report	Polievka 9'; Beriashvili (yellow card) 32'; R. Molnár 90+3'	Stadium: Városi Stadion; Attendance: 600; Referee: Bence Hanyecz; Assistant referees: Norbert Bornemissza, Pál Vrbovszki

30 October 2024 Round of 32	Szeged	0–3	MTK	Szeged
18:00 CET (UTC+1)	Novák (yellow card) 42'	Report	Zsom. Nagy (yellow card) 22'; Végh 25'; Beriashvili (yellow card) 42'; Németh 45'; Polievka 47'; A. Horváth (yellow card) 51'; Hey (yellow card) 58'; Varju (yellow card) 61'	Stadium: Szent Gellért Fórum; Attendance: 2,144; Referee: Bence Hanyecz; Assistant referees: Bence Péter Belicza, Pál Vrbovszki; Fourth official: Patrik Fehérvári

26 February 2025 Round of 16	Iváncsa	0–2	MTK	Iváncsa
13:00 CET (UTC+1)	Pál (yellow card) 29'	Report	Zsom. Nagy (yellow card) 23'; Stieber 26'; A. Horváth 61'	Stadium: Károlyi István Sporttelep; Attendance: 200; Referee: Péter Zierkelbach; Assistant referees: Zoltán Horváth, Ákos Berényi; Fourth official: Gábor Iványi

3 April 2025 Quarter-finals	MTK	4–2	Fehérvár	Budapest
19:30 CEST (UTC+2)	Németh 51'; I. Bognár 55'; Jurina 73'; Miličević 76' (o.g.)	Report	Šekularac 20', (yellow card) 49'; Holender (yellow card) 53'; Má. Kovács (yellow card) 54'; Petrov (yellow card) 75'; Šaponjić 89'	Stadium: Hidegkuti Nándor Stadion; Attendance: 1,600; Referee: Balázs Berke; Assistant referees: Gergő Vígh-Tarsonyi, Balázs Szert; Fourth official: Ferenc Karakó

23 April 2025 Semi-finals	Ferencváros	3–1	MTK	Budapest
20:00 CEST (UTC+2)	Ramírez 45'; Pešić (yellow card) 44', (goal) 51'; Joseph 75'	Report	R. Molnár 16', (yellow card) 90+2'; Beriashvili (yellow card) 44'; P. Kovács I (yellow card) 87'; Kádár (yellow card) 90+3'	Stadium: Groupama Arena; Attendance: 11,057; Referee: Csaba Pintér; Assistant referees: Gergő Vígh-Tarsonyi, Dávid Rózsa; Fourth official: Marcell Derdák

== Statistics ==
=== Overall ===
Appearances (Apps) numbers are for appearances in competitive games only, including sub appearances.
Source: Competitions

No.	Player	Pos.	Nemzeti Bajnokság I				Magyar Kupa				Total			
No.	Player	Pos.	Apps	Goal	Booked	Sent off (straight red)	Apps	Goal	Booked	Sent off (straight red)	Apps	Goal	Booked	Sent off (straight red)
1	(Hungary) Patrik Demjén	GK	31		1						31		1	
2	(Hungary) Benedek Varju	DF	24	4	7	1	4		1		28	4	8	1
3	(Serbia) Nemanja Antonov	DF	14		2		2				16		2	
4	(Hungary) Dávid Bobál	DF	5		2		1				6		2	
5	(Hungary) Zsombor Nagy	DF	12		2		2		2		14		4	
6	(Hungary) Mihály Kata	MF	32		10		5				37		10	
7	(Hungary) Zoltán Stieber	FW	20	2	2		3	1			23	3	2	
8	(Hungary) Márk Kosznovszky	MF	25	3	7		5				30	3	7	
9	(Hungary) Rajmund Molnár	FW	29	5	6		3	2	1		32	7	7	
10	(Hungary) István Bognár	MF	29	5	3		3	1			32	6	3	
11	(Bosnia and Herzegovina) Marin Jurina	FW	33	13	3		3	1			36	14	3	
12	(Hungary) Adrián Csenterics	GK	2				5				7			
13	(Hungary) Gergő Rácz	GK												
14	(Hungary) Artúr Horváth	MF	27	2	1		5	1	1		32	3	2	
16	(Hungary) Bence Végh	MF	25	1	2		4	1			29	2	2	
17	(Slovakia) Róbert Polievka	FW	26	4			4	2			30	6		
18	(Hungary) Krisztián Németh	FW	23	3	1	1	4	2			27	5	1	1
20	(Hungary) Sámuel Bakó	MF	1				1				2			
21	(Hungary) Gergő Kocsis	MF	4								4			
22	(Ukraine) Viktor Hey	DF	24	2	4		3		1		27	2	5	
23	(Hungary) Ádin Molnár	FW	28	1	2	1	5				33	1	2	1
24	(Georgia (country)) Ilia Beriashvili	DF	20	2	3		4		3		24	2	6	
25	(Hungary) Tamás Kádár	DF	26	1	8		4		1		30	1	9	
26	(Hungary) Gergő Szőke	MF	4				1				5			
27	(Hungary) Patrik Kovács	DF	27	1	6		4		1		31	1	7	
28	(Hungary) Noel Kenesei	FW	3				2				5			
29	(Hungary) József Balázs	GK												
30	(Hungary) Zsombor Gruber	FW	9	2	1						9	2	1	
31	(Hungary) Domonkos Bene	MF	2				1				3			
33	(Ghana) Christian Anokye	DF												
35	(Hungary) Balázs Jádi	MF	1								1			
36	(Hungary) Zoltán Csucsánszky	FW	1								1			
Own goals				2				1				3		
Totals				53	73	3		12	11			65	84	3

=== Clean sheets ===
			Clean sheets		
No.	Player	Games Played	Nemzeti Bajnokság I	Magyar Kupa	Total
1	(Hungary) Patrik Demjén	31	7		7
12	(Hungary) Adrián Csenterics	7		3	3
13	(Hungary) Gergő Rácz				
29	(Hungary) József Balázs				
Totals			7	3	10
