= List of Hungarian football transfers summer 2025 =

The 2025 Hungarian football summer transfer window runs from 21 July to 31 August.

== Transfers ==
All players and clubs without a flag are Hungarian.

Date	Player	Moving from	Moving to	Fee
27 May 2025	Cadu	Viktoria Plzeň	Ferencváros	Free agent
27 May 2025	Jakub Plšek	Puskás Akadémia	MTK	Free agent
27 May 2025	Jakov Puljić	Puskás Akadémia	Vukovar 1991	
29 May 2025	Csongor Papp	Szentlőrinc (NB II) (loan)	Zalaegerszeg	Returned from loan
29 May 2025	András Huszti	Videoton (loan)	Zalaegerszeg	Returned from loan
30 May 2025	Balázs Bakti	Puskás Akadémia (loan)	Zalaegerszeg	After loan permanently
30 May 2025	Zalán Kerezsi	Bp. Honvéd (NB II) (loan)	Puskás Akadémia	After loan permanently
2 June 2025	Bence Ötvös	Paks	Ferencváros	Undisclosed
2 June 2025	János Szépe	Győr	TBD	Undisclosed
2 June 2025	Ábel Krajcsovics	Bp. Honvéd (NB II) (loan)	Zalaegerszeg	Loan extended
3 June 2025	Nika Kvekveskiri	Nyíregyháza	—	Contracts expire
3 June 2025	Darko Velkovski	Nyíregyháza	—	Contracts expire
3 June 2025	Krisztián Géresi	Nyíregyháza	—	Contracts expire
4 June 2025	Mohamed Ali Ben Romdhane	Ferencváros	Al Ahly	Undisclosed
4 June 2025	Eldar Ćivić	Ferencváros	Baltika Kaliningrad	Undisclosed
4 June 2025	Botond Kocsis	Győr Academy	Győr	Free agent
5 June 2025	Bence Juhász	Mezőkövesd (NB II)	Újpest	Undisclosed
5 June 2025	Bojan Sanković	Zalaegerszeg	TBD	Free agent
5 June 2025	Milán Klausz	Nafta Lendava	Zalaegerszeg	Returned from loan
7 June 2025	Ármin Pécsi	Puskás Akadémia	Liverpool	Undisclosed
8 June 2025	Zoltán Stieber	MTK	—	Contracts expire
10 June 2025	Bojan Sanković	Zalaegerszeg	Nyíregyháza	Free agent
10 June 2025	Dávid Bobál	MTK	—	Contracts expire
10 June 2025	Bence Végh	MTK	Csíkszereda	Contracts expire
11 June 2025	Barnabás Nagy	Nyíregyháza	Ferencváros	Undisclosed
11 June 2025	János Szépe	Győr	MTK	Undisclosed
11 June 2025	Imre Széles	Kisvárda	MTK	Undisclosed
11 June 2025	Marko Matanović	FK Sarajevo (loan)	Kisvárda	Loan contract expire
12 June 2025	Zsombor Nagy	MTK	—	Contracts expire
12 June 2025	Virgil Misidjan	Ferencváros	NEC Nijmegen	Undisclosed
12 June 2025	Krisztián Nagy	Kecskemét (NB II)	Kisvárda	Undisclosed
12 June 2025	Ádám Czékus	Kisvárda	Kecskemét (NB II)	Permanently after loan
13 June 2025	Owusu Kwabena	Ferencváros	Maccabi Bnei Reineh	Contracts expire
13 June 2025	Ronald Schuszter	Kozármisleny (NB II)	Kazincbarcika	Undisclosed
13 June 2025	Daniel Arzani	Melbourne Victory	Ferencváros	Undisclosed
14 June 2025	Zoárd Nagy	Csákvár (NB II)	Puskás Akadémia	Undisclosed
14 June 2025	Krisztián Géresi	Nyíregyháza	—	Retired
16 June 2025	Dániel Lukács	Kecskemét	Puskás Akadémia	Undisclosed
16 June 2025	Bálint Oláh	Budafok (NB II)	Kisvárda	Undisclosed
16 June 2025	Balázs Megyeri	Debrecen	Győri ETO	Free agent
16 June 2025	László Rácz	Pécsi MFC (NB III)	Kazincbarcika	Returned from loan
16 June 2025	Milán Májer	Kecskemét	Nyíregyháza	Undisclosed
16 June 2025	Péter Törőcsik	Iváncsa (NB III)	MTK	Returned from loan
16 June 2025	Mátyás Kovács	Videoton	MTK	Returned from loan
16 June 2025	Roland Lehoczky	Vasas (NB II)	MTK	Returned from loan
16 June 2025	Ádám Merényi	MTK	Kecskemét (NB II)	Undisclosed
16 June 2025	Gellért Genzler (GK)	Újpest	TBD	Contract expire
16 June 2025	Chukwujekwu Ajanah-Chinedu (DF)	Újpest	TBD	Contract expire
17 June 2025	Bence Pethő	Kazincbarcika	Vasas (NB II)	Free agent
17 June 2025	Jonathan Levi	Puskás Akadémia	Ferencváros	Free agent
18 June 2025	Shūichi Gonda	Debrecen	Vissel Kobe	Contracts expire, Free agent
18 June 2025	Gergő Kocsis	Debrecen	Videoton (NB II)	Contracts expire, Free agent
18 June 2025	Aranđel Stojković	Debrecen	TBD	Contracts expire, Free agent
18 June 2025	Maurides	Debrecen	Radomiak Radom	Contracts expire, Free agent
18 June 2025	Henrik Castegren	Debrecen	Sirius	Mutual of agreement
18 June 2025	Kristiyan Malinov	Debrecen	Botev Vratsa	Mutual of agreement
19 June 2025	János Ferenczi	Debrecen	Csíkszereda	Contracts expire, Free agent
19 June 2025	Aljoša Matko	Celje	Újpest	Undisclosed
19 June 2025	István Átrok	Bp. Honvéd (NB II)	MTK	Undisclosed
19 June 2025	Ákos Zuigeber	MTK	Bp. Honvéd (NB II)	Undisclosed
20 June 2025	Zsombor Bévárdi	Bp. Honvéd (NB II)	MTK	Undisclosed
20 June 2025	Viktor Hey	MTK	Vasas (NB II)	Contracts expire
20 June 2025	Szabolcs Szalay	Zalaegerszeg	Csíkszereda	Undisclosed
20 June 2025	Arijan Ademi	Dinamo Zagreb	Újpest	Free agent
20 June 2025	Yaroslav Helesh	Szentlőrinc (NB II) (loan)	Kisvárda	Returned from loan
21 June 2025	Tonislav Yordanov	Arda Kardzhali	Kisvárda	Undisclosed
21 June 2025	Sinan Medgyes	Zalaegerszeg	Kisvárda	Contracts expire
21 June 2025	Oleksandr Safronov	Zalaegerszeg	TBD	Contracts expire
21 June 2025	Stefanos Evangelou	Zalaegerszeg	Nyíregyháza	Contracts expire
22 June 2025	Alexander Abrahamsson	Zagłębie Lubin	Győr	Free agent
23 June 2025	Vincent Onovo	Újpest	TBD	Contract expire
23 June 2025	Márk Mucsányi	Újpest	Diósgyőr	Free agent
23 June 2025	Gábor Megyeri	Bp. Honvéd (NB II)	Diósgyőr	Undisclosed
23 June 2025	Máté Sajbán	Zalaegerszeg	Diósgyőr	Free agent
23 June 2025	Anderson Esiti	Zalaegerszeg	Diósgyőr	Undisclosed
23 June 2025	Oleksandr Pyshchur	Gyirmót (NB II)	Győr	Free agent
23 June 2025	Bright Edomwonyi	Diósgyőr	Nyíregyháza	Undisclosed
24 June 2025	Mykhaylo Meskhi	Kecskemét	Kazincbarcika	Free agent
24 June 2025	Fran Manzanara	Racing Ferrol	Debrecen	Undisclosed
24 June 2025	Toon Raemaekers	Mechelen	Ferencváros	Undisclosed
24 June 2025	Brandon Domingues	Debrecen	Real Oviedo	Undisclosed
25 June 2025	Bálint Szabó	Paks	Csíkszereda	Undisclosed
25 June 2025	András Németh	Hamburger SV	Puskás Akadémia	Undisclosed
25 June 2025	Zsolt Pap	Kisvárda	TBD	Mutual of agreement
25 June 2025	David Puclin	Kisvárda	TBD	Contracts expire
25 June 2025	Ivan Šaponjić	Videoton	Diósgyőr	Undisclosed
25 June 2025	Bohdan Melnyk	Videoton	Kisvárda	Undisclosed
26 June 2025	Márió Zeke	Kecskemét	Paks	Undisclosed
26 June 2025	Milán Pető	Videoton	Paks	Undisclosed
26 June 2025	Krisztián Kovács	Paks	Videoton	Undisclosed
26 June 2025	Bence Kocsis	Paks	Videoton	Undisclosed
26 June 2025	Soma Novothny	Ruch Chorzów	Kisvárda	Undisclosed
26 June 2025	Dániel Gyollai	Glentoran	Kazincbarcika	Undisclosed
27 June 2025	József Szalai	Mezőkövesd (NB II)	Paks	Undisclosed
27 June 2025	Olivér Kun	Puskás Akadémia	Kazincbarcika	Undisclosed
27 June 2025	Barnabás Menyhárt	Bp. Honvéd (NB II)	Kazincbarcika	Undisclosed
27 June 2025	Bence Szalai	Diósgyőr II (NB III)	Kazincbarcika	Undisclosed
27 June 2025	Dominik Mulac	Opatija	Kazincbarcika	Undisclosed
27 June 2025	Martin Šlogar	Gorica	Kazincbarcika	Undisclosed
27 June 2025	Szabolcs Mezei	Paks	TSC	Undisclosed
30 June 2025	Nemanja Antonov	MTK	Nyíregyháza	Free agent
30 June 2025	Mamady Diarra	Győr	Sheriff Tiraspol	Contracts expire
30 June 2025	Branislav Danilović	Diósgyőr	TBD	Contract expired
30 June 2025	Artem Odyntsov	Diósgyőr	TBD	Contract expired
30 June 2025	Bozhidar Chorbadzhiyski	Diósgyőr	TBD	Contract expired
30 June 2025	Vladislav Klimovich	Diósgyőr	TBD	Contract expired
30 June 2025	Marko Čubrilo (DF)	Zalaegerszeg	Radnik Bijeljina	Undisclosed
1 July 2025	Josua Mejías	Athens Kallithea	Debrecen	Free agent
1 July 2025	Albion Marku	Győr	TBD	Contracts expire
1 July 2025	Lucas	Kazincbarcika	Tiszakécske (NB II)	Free agent
1 July 2025	József Varga	Kazincbarcika	Tiszakécske (NB II)	Free agent
1 July 2025	Mátyás Király	Kazincbarcika	TBD	Free agent
1 July 2025	Barnabás Németh (FW)	Nyíregyháza	Vasas (NB II)	After loan permanently
1 July 2025	Patrik Pinte (FW)	Nyíregyháza	Budapest Honvéd (NB II)	After loan permanently
1 July 2025	Kevin Horváth (MF)	Nyíregyháza	Soroksár (NB II)	Undisclosed
1 July 2025	Ronaldo Deaconu (MF)	Nyíregyháza	TBD	Contract expire
2 July 2025	Mátyás Katona	Videoton	Nyíregyháza	Undisclosed
2 July 2025	Balázs Manner (MF)	Ferencváros	Nyíregyháza	Undisclosed
3 July 2025	Bálint Ferencsik (MF)	Diósgyőr	TBD	Mutual agreement
3 July 2025	Patrik Ternován (DF)	Kazincbarcika	TBD	Free agent
3 July 2025	Dániel Prosser (FW)	no team	Kazincbarcika	Free agent
4 July 2025	Callum O'Dowda (MF)	Cardiff City	Ferencváros	Undisclosed
4 July 2025	Dorian Babunski (FW)	Sepsi	Nyíregyháza	Undisclosed
4 July 2025	Gergő Szőke (MF)	MTK	Kazincbarcika	Undisclosed
4 July 2025	Bence Trencsényi (FW)	Tiszafüred (NB III)	Kazincbarcika	Undisclosed
4 July 2025	Iuri Medeiros (FW)	Hapoel Be'er Sheva	Újpest	Free agent
4 July 2025	Zsombor Nagy (DF)	MTK	Zalaegerszeg	Free agent
4 July 2025	Jack Ipalibo (MF)	Zalaegerszeg	Torreense	Contracts expire
5 July 2025	Gleofilo Vlijter (FW)	OFK Beograd	Újpest	Undisclosed
7 July 2025	Tamás Fadgyas (GK)	Kazincbarcika	MTK	Contract expire
8 July 2025	Julien Dacosta (DF)	Sochaux	Debrecen	Undisclosed
8 July 2025	Ákos Kecskés (DF)	AEL Limassol	Diósgyőr	Undisclosed
8 July 2025	Roland Varga (FW)	Paks	Videoton (NB II)	Undisclosed
8 July 2025	Bálint Rideg (FW)	Vasas (NB II)	Paks	Undisclosed
8 July 2025	Palkó Dárdai (FW)	Hertha BSC	Puskás Akadémia	Undisclosed
9 July 2025	Ádám Bódi (MF)	Kazincbarcika	Tiszakécske (NB II)	Undisclosed
10 July 2025	Varazdat Haroyan (DF)	Pyunik Yerevan	Kazincbarcika	Undisclosed
10 July 2025	Say Shadirac (DF)	Ferencváros	AC Oulu	On loan
10 July 2025	Béla Fejér (GK)	Nyíregyháza	TBD	Mutual agreement
10 July 2025	Jaroslav Navrátil (FW)	Nyíregyháza	TBD	Mutual agreement
10 July 2025	Žan Mauricio Lalović (GK)	NK Nafta	Zalaegerszeg	Undisclosed
11 July 2025	Ante Roguljić (MF)	Anorthosis Famagusta	Diósgyőr	Undisclosed
11 July 2025	Matheus Saldanha (FW)	Ferencváros	Al Wasl	Undisclosed
13 July 2025	Artem Odyntsov (GK)	Diósgyőr	Andijon	Undisclosed
14 July 2025	Norbert Könyves (FW)	Paks	Kazincbarcika	Free agent
14 July 2025	Dániel Kovács (GK)	Volos	Nyíregyháza	Undisclosed
15 July 2025	Dávid Dombó (GK)	no club	Kazincbarcika	Free agent
16 July 2025	Moshe Semel (MF)	Hapoel Rishon LeZion	Puskás Akadémia	Undisclosed
16 July 2025	Heitor (DF)	Győr	Maccabi Tel Aviv	Undisclosed
16 July 2025	Tiago Gonçalves (DF)	Hermannstadt	Újpest	Undisclosed
17 July 2025	Kevin Kállai (MF)	Diósgyőr	Bp. Honvéd (NB II)	Mutual agreement
17 July 2025	Zoltán Kállai (FW)	Diósgyőr	TBD	Mutual agreement
17 July 2025	João Victor (FW)	Ceará	Zalaegerszeg	Undisclosed
17 July 2025	Kristóf Herjeczki (FW)	Kazincbarcika	Ajka (NB II)	Free agent
17 July 2025	Ádám Pintér (FW)	Kazincbarcika	Mezőkövesd (NB II)	Free agent
17 July 2025	Nadhir Benbouali (FW)	Charleroi	Győr	Contract after loan expiry
18 July 2025	Adrián Guerrero	Tenerife	Debrecen	Free agent
18 July 2025	Vince Fekete (FW)	Diósgyőr	DEAC (NB III)	Mutual agreement
20 July 2025	Jovan Živković	Rapid Wien	Győr	Undisclosed
23 July 2025	Márton Eppel (FW)	Nyíregyháza	Csíkszereda	Undisclosed
23 July 2025	Gabi Kanichowsky (MF)	Maccabi Tel Aviv	Ferencváros	Undisclosed
24 July 2025	Álex Bermejo (FW)	Farense	Debrecen	Free agent
24 July 2025	Cristian Ramírez (DF)	Ferencváros	Lokomotiv Moscow	Mutual agreement
25 July 2025	Márk Kosznovszky (MF)	MTK	Portsmouth	Undisclosed
25 July 2025	Erik Czérna (MF)	Kisvárda	Szentlőrinc (NB II)	Undisclosed
28 July 2025	Vyacheslav Kulbachuk (DF)	Džiugas Telšiai	Debrecen	Undisclosed
28 July 2025	Raul Gustavo (DF)	Ferencváros	New York City FC	Mutual agreement
28 July 2025	Gergő Csatári (DF)	Diósgyőr	Mezőkövesd (NB II)	Mutual agreement
29 July 2025	Viktor Vitályos (DF)	Puskás Akadémia	MTK	Undisclosed
30 July 2025	Péter Szappanos (GK)	Al Fateh	Puskás Akadémia	Undisclosed
30 July 2025	Myke Ramos (FW)	Kazincbarcika	Tiszakécske (NB II)	Undisclosed
30 July 2025	Miloš Spasić (FW)	Kisvárda	TBD	Mutual agreement
31 July 2025	Márk Tamás (DF)	Sepsi	Diósgyőr	Undisclosed
2 August 2025	Dejan Djokic (FW)	Sion	Debrecen	Undisclosed
3 August 2025	Ștefan Vlădoiu (DF)	Kolos Kovalivka	Győr	Undisclosed
4 August 2025	Lóránd Pászka (MF)	Ferencváros	Csíkszereda	Undisclosed
4 August 2025	György Komáromi (FW)	Maribor	Debrecen	Undisclosed
5 August 2025	Martin Kern (MF)	Sturm Graz	Puskás Akadémia	Undisclosed
8 August 2025	Meshack Ubochioma (FW)	Dundee United	Kazincbarcika	Free agent
8 August 2025	Ognjen Radošević (MF)	Újpest	Borac Banja Luka	Mutual agreement
11 August 2025	Zsombor Berecz (MF)	Vasas	Kazincbarcika	Free agent
12 August 2025	Levente Katona (DF)	Kecskemét (NB II)	Nyíregyháza	Undisclosed
12 August 2025	David López (DF)	Toluca (U21)	Zalaegerszeg	Free agent
14 August 2025	Bálint Katona (MF)	Ferencváros	Nyíregyháza	Undisclosed
15 August 2025	Kevin Varga (FW)	Ankaragücü	Nyíregyháza	Undisclosed
15 August 2025	Pape Sissoko (FW)	Reims	Debrecen	Undisclosed
18 August 2025	Neven Đurasek (MF)	Debrecen	TBD	Mutual agreement
18 August 2025	Jorgo Pëllumbi (DF)	Debrecen	TBD	Mutual agreement
19 August 2025	Adama Traoré (FW)	Ferencváros	Gençlerbirliği	Undisclosed
21 August 2025	Gergő Bodnár (DF)	Vasas (NB II)	Zalaegerszeg	Free agent
26 August 2025	Erik Vázquez (FW)	Real Madrid U19	Debrecen	Free agent
29 August 2025	Sodiq Rasheed (DF)	Rabotnichki	Kazincbarcika	Free agent
30 August 2025	Rajmund Molnár (FW)	MTK	Pogoń Szczecin	Undisclosed
31 August 2025	Bamidele Yusuf (FW)	Vojvodina	Ferencváros	Undisclosed
1 September 2025	Csanád Dénes (MF)	Zalaegerszeg	Kortrijk	Undisclosed
2 September 2025	Eneo Bitri (DF)	Győri ETO	Nyíregyháza	Undisclosed
3 September 2025	Yohan Croizet (MF)	Zalaegerszeg	Diósgyőr	Undisclosed
3 September 2025	Aboubakar Keita (MF)	Nyíregyháza	Diósgyőr	Undisclosed
3 September 2025	András Huszti (DF)	Zalaegerszeg	TBD	Mutual of agreement
3 September 2025	José Calderón (DF)	Córdoba	Zalaegerszeg	Free agent
4 September 2025	Michael Okeke (MF)	Manchester City U21	Puskás Akadémia	Undisclosed
4 September 2025	Guilherme Henrique (FW)	Ferencváros	TBD	Undisclosed
4 September 2025	Dantaye Gilbert (MF)	Jong PSV	Nyíregyháza	Undisclosed
4 September 2025	László Deutsch (DF)	Vasas	Kazincbarcika	Undisclosed
10 September 2025	Víctor Camarasa (MF)	Eldense	Debrecen	Free agent
10 September 2025	Blessing Eleke (FW)	Partizani Tirana	Kazincbarcika	Free agent
13 September 2025	Diego Borges (DF)	Santos U20	Zalaegerszeg	Free agent
20 September 2025	Wajdi Sahli (MF)	Győr	Radnički 1923	Undisclosed
3 October 2025	Senna Miangué (DF)	Cercle Brugge	Győr	Free agent
28 November 2025	Blessing Eleke (FW)	Kazincbarcika	TBD	Sacked
3 December 2025	André Duarte (DF)	Újpest	TBD	Sacked
9 December 2025	Nikola Radmanovac (DF)	Qingdao Hainiu	Kisvárda	Free agent

== Loans ==
=== Loans to ===
Date	Player	Moving from	Loaned to	Loan date	Ref.
20 June 2025	Gábor Stumpf	MTK	Budafok (Nemzeti Bajnokság II)	30 June 2026	
23 June 2025	Balázs Varga	Újpest	Budafok (Nemzeti Bajnokság II)	30 June 2026	
23 June 2025	Bence Sós	TSC	Kazincbarcika	30 June 2026	
25 June 2025	Botond Herczeg	MTK	Budafok (Nemzeti Bajnokság II)	30 June 2026	
26 June 2025	Milán Győrfi	Paks	Kecskemét (Nemzeti Bajnokság II)	30 June 2026	
27 June 2025	József Szalai	Paks	Mezőkövesd (Nemzeti Bajnokság II)	30 June 2026	
28 June 2025	Alen Skribek	Paks	Zalaegerszeg	30 June 2026	
1 July 2025	Fabricio Amato	Estudiantes de La Plata	Zalaegerszeg	30 June 2026	
1 July 2025	Mátyás Vidnyánszky	Debrecen	Mezőkövesd (Nemzeti Bajnokság II)	30 June 2026	
1 July 2025	Sámuel Bakó (MF)	MTK	Kozármisleny (NB II)	30 June 2026	
2 July 2025	Vencel Lajcsik (DF)	Diósgyőr	Budafok (Nemzeti Bajnokság II)	30 June 2026	
2 July 2025	Joseth Peraza (DF)	San Carlos	Zalaegerszeg	30 June 2026	
2 July 2025	Zalán Debreceni (DF)	Paks	Ajka (Nemzeti Bajnokság II)	30 June 2026	
4 July 2025	Gergő Bánfalvi (GK)	Vasas (Nemzeti Bajnokság II)	Kazincbarcika	30 June 2026	
9 July 2025	Ádám Varga (GK)	Ferencváros	Debrecen	30 June 2026	
10 July 2025	Márk Dékei (MF)	Újpest	Videoton (Nemzeti Bajnokság II)	30 June 2026	
11 July 2025	Adrián Csenterics (GK)	MTK	Mérida (Primera Federación)	30 June 2026	
12 July 2025	Ervin Németh (GK)	Zalaegerszeg	Nafta 1903	30 June 2026	
15 July 2025	Fábio Vianna (DF)	Győr	Sepsi OSK	30 June 2026	
15 July 2025	Krisztián Keresztes (DF)	Nyíregyháza	Dundee United	30 June 2026	
16 July 2025	Noel Kenesei (FW)	MTK	OH Leuven (Belgian Pro League)	30 June 2026	
17 July 2025	Đorđe Gordić (MF)	Lommel S.K.	Debrecen	30 June 2026	
18 July 2025	Olivér Tamás (DF)	Nyíregyháza	BVSC (Nemzeti Bajnokság II)	30 June 2026	
19 July 2025	Bendegúz Farkas (DF)	Puskás Akadémia	Nyíregyháza	30 June 2026	
22 July 2025	Olivér Svékus (GK)	Újpest	Videoton (Nemzeti Bajnokság II)	30 June 2026	
23 July 2025	Marcell Major (MF)	Puskás Akadémia	Kazincbarcika	30 June 2026	
23 July 2025	Bendegúz Lehoczki (GK)	Puskás Akadémia	Csákvár (NB II)	30 June 2026	
23 July 2025	Filip Pintér (FW)	Vasas (NB II)	Kisvárda	30 June 2026	
24 July 2025	Hunor Németh (MF)	Copenhagen	MTK	30 June 2026	
25 July 2025	Szabolcs Sáreczki (FW)	Diósgyőr	Mezőkövesd (NB II)	30 June 2026	
25 July 2025	Nazar Kovalenko (MF)	Diósgyőr	Mezőkövesd (NB II)	30 June 2026	
25 July 2025	Bohdan Furdetskyi (FW)	Diósgyőr	Mezőkövesd (NB II)	30 June 2026	
25 July 2025	Nimród Baranyai (DF)	Újpest	Kazincbarcika	30 June 2026	
29 July 2025	Bence Babos (FW)	Videoton (NB II)	Diósgyőr	30 June 2026	
30 July 2025	Levente Babós (DF)	Újpest	Diósgyőr	30 June 2026	
30 July 2025	Miron Mucsányi (MF)	Újpest	Diósgyőr	30 June 2026	
30 July 2025	Lamin Marong (FW)	Nyíregyháza	Šamorín (2. Liga (Slovakia))	30 June 2026	
1 August 2025	Zsombor Vukk (FW)	Nyíregyháza	Tiszakécske (NB II)	30 June 2026	
2 August 2025	Márk Csinger (DF)	DAC 1904	Győr	30 June 2026	
4 August 2025	Maxsuell Alegria (FW)	Vasco da Gama	Zalaegerszeg	30 June 2026	
4 August 2025	Mátyás Kovács (FW)	MTK	Košice (Slovak First Football League)	30 June 2026	
4 August 2025	Zsombor Vukk (FW)	Nyíregyháza	Tiszakécske (NB II)	30 June 2026	
4 August 2025	Zsombor Csörnyei (DF)	Nyíregyháza	Ajka (NB II)	30 June 2026	
4 August 2025	Ákos Kun (MF)	Nyíregyháza	Szeged (NB II)	30 June 2026	
4 August 2025	Róbert Tarcsi (FW)	Nyíregyháza	Karcag (NB II)	30 June 2026	
8 August 2025	Krisztián Lisztes (MF)	Eintracht Frankfurt	Ferencváros	30 June 2026	
11 August 2025	Szabolcs Dusinszki (MF)	Puskás Akadémia	Csíkszereda	30 June 2026	
12 August 2025	Zalán Kerezsi (FW)	Puskás Akadémia	MTK	30 June 2026	
19 August 2025	Bence Szalai (DF)	Kazincbarcika	Dorog (NB II)	30 June 2026	
30 August 2025	Daniel (FW)	Atlético Goianiense	Zalaegerszeg	30 June 2026	
1 September 2025	Dávid Dombó (GK)	Kazincbarcika	Újpest	30 June 2026	
1 September 2025	Bence Juhász (GK)	Újpest	Kazincbarcika	30 June 2026	
1 September 2025	Kenan Kodro (FW)	Ferencváros	Zaragoza	30 June 2026	
1 September 2025	Szabolcs Schön (MF)	Bolton Wanderers	Győr	30 June 2026	
2 September 2025	Žan Medved (FW)	Nyíregyháza	Slovácko (Czech First League)	30 June 2026	
2 September 2025	Norbert Kaján (DF)	Ferencváros	Csíkszereda	30 June 2026	
3 September 2025	Szilárd Szabó (FW)	Ferencváros	Kisvárda	30 June 2026	
4 September 2025	Máté Szabó (FW)	Kazincbarcika	Ajka (NB II)	30 June 2026	
4 September 2025	Ștefan Bîtca (FW)	Zimbru Chișinău	Zalaegerszeg	30 June 2026	
8 September 2025	Aleksandar Ćirković (FW)	Ferencváros	Lechia Gdańsk	30 June 2026	
10 September 2025	Edgar Sevikyan (MF)	Ferencváros	Akron Tolyatti	30 June 2026	

=== Loans from ===
Date	Player	Moving from	Moving to	Ref.
Pre-season	Edgar Sevikyan	Lokomotiv Moscow	Ferencváros	
Pre-season	Péter Baráth	Raków Częstochowa	Ferencváros	
Pre-season	Daniel Štefulj	Dinamo Zagreb	Győr	
29 May 2025	Csongor Papp	Szentlőrinc (Nemzeti Bajnokság II)	Zalaegerszeg	
29 May 2025	András Huszti	Fehérvár	Zalaegerszeg	
30 May 2025	Balázs Bakti	Puskás Akadémia	Zalaegerszeg	
2 June 2025	Ábel Krajcsovics	Bp. Honvéd (NB II) (loan)	Zalaegerszeg	Loan extended
27 June 2025	Nadhir Benbouali (FW)	Győri ETO	Charleroi	
27 June 2025	Eneo Bitri (DF)	Győri ETO	Vålerenga	
30 June 2025	Barnabás Simon	Diósgyőr	Paks	
30 June 2025	Uroš Drezgić	Diósgyőr	Rubin Kazan	
30 June 2025	Marcell Huszár	Diósgyőr	Győr	
30 June 2025	Marko Rakonjac	Diósgyőr	Lokomotiv Moscow	
30 June 2025	Zétény Varga	Diósgyőr	Ferencváros	
21 July 2025	Milán Vitális (MF)	DAC 1904	Győr	
21 July 2025	Željko Gavrić (FW)	DAC 1904	Győr	

== See also ==
- 2025–26 Nemzeti Bajnokság I
