= Viktor Hey =

Viktor Hey may refer to:

- Viktor Hey (footballer, born 1974), Ukrainian retired footballer
- Viktor Hey (footballer, born 1996), Ukrainian footballer
