= 2021–22 Nemzeti Bajnokság I =

Nemzeti Bajnokság I
- Season: 2021–22
- Dates: 30 July 2021 – 8 May 2022
- Champions: Ferencváros
- Champions League: Ferencváros
- Europa Conference League: Kisvárda; Puskás Akadémia; Fehérvár
- Matches: 198
- Goals: 562 (2.84 per match)
- Top goalscorer: Martin Ádám (31 goals)

The 2021–22 Nemzeti Bajnokság I (also known as 2021–22 OTP Bank Liga), also known as NB I, was the 123rd season of top-tier football in Hungary. The league was officially named OTP Bank Liga for sponsorship reasons. Ferencváros were the defending champions.

== Teams ==
Diósgyőr and Budafok finished the 2020–21 Nemzeti Bajnokság I in the last two places and thus were relegated to NB II division.

The two relegated teams were replaced with the top two teams in 2020–21 Nemzeti Bajnokság II, champion Debrecen and runner-up Gyirmót, each having the required licence for top-division play.

=== Stadium and locations ===
Following is the list of clubs competing in the league this season, with their location, stadium and stadium capacity.

Team	Location	Stadium	Capacity	2020–21
Debrecen	Debrecen	Nagyerdei Stadion	20,340	1st (NB II)
Fehérvár	Székesfehérvár	MOL Aréna Sóstó	14,144	3rd
Ferencváros	Budapest (Ferencváros)	Groupama Aréna	22,043	1st
Gyirmót	Győr	Ménfői úti Stadion	4,500	2nd (NB II)
Honvéd	Budapest (Kispest)	Bozsik Aréna	8,000	10th
Kisvárda	Kisvárda	Várkerti Stadion	2,993	5th
Mezőkövesd	Mezőkövesd	Városi Stadion	4,183	8th
MTK	Budapest	Hidegkuti Nándor Stadion	5,014	7th
Puskás Akadémia	Felcsút	Pancho Aréna	3,816	2nd
Paks	Paks	Fehérvári úti Stadion	6,150	4th
Újpest	Budapest (Újpest)	Szusza Ferenc Stadion	12,670	6th
Zalaegerszeg	Zalaegerszeg	ZTE Aréna	11,200	9th

Debrecen	Fehérvár	Ferencváros	Gyirmót
Nagyerdei Stadion	MOL Aréna Sóstó; UEFA Category 4 Stadium	Groupama Aréna	Ménfői úti Stadion
Capacity: 20,340	Capacity: 14,201	Capacity: 22,043	Capacity: 4,728
Honvéd	Location of teams in 2019–20 Nemzeti Bajnokság I Location of Budapest teams		Kisvárda
Bozsik Aréna	Location of teams in 2019–20 Nemzeti Bajnokság I Location of Budapest teams		Várkerti Stadion
Capacity: 8,428	Location of teams in 2019–20 Nemzeti Bajnokság I Location of Budapest teams		Capacity: 2,993
Mezőkövesd	Location of teams in 2019–20 Nemzeti Bajnokság I Location of Budapest teams		MTK
Városi-Stadion	Location of teams in 2019–20 Nemzeti Bajnokság I Location of Budapest teams		Hidegkuti Nándor Stadion
Capacity: 4,183	Location of teams in 2019–20 Nemzeti Bajnokság I Location of Budapest teams		Capacity: 5,014
Paks	Puskás Akadémia	Újpest	Zalaegerszeg
Fehérvári úti Stadion	Pancho Aréna	Szusza Ferenc Stadion	ZTE Arena
Capacity: 6,163	Capacity: 3,816	Capacity: 13,432	Capacity: 11,200

=== Personnel and kits ===
All teams are obligated to have the logo of the league sponsor OTP Bank as well as the Nemzeti Bajnokság I logo on the right side of their shirt. Hungarian national sports betting brand Tippmix sponsors all 12 teams of the first league since February 2019, their logo is therefore present on all team kits.

Note: Flags indicate national team as has been defined under FIFA eligibility rules. Players and Managers may hold more than one non-FIFA nationality.

Team	Head coach	Captain	Kit manufacturer	Additional shirt sponsor
Debrecen	(Spain) Joan Carrillo	(Hungary) Balázs Dzsudzsák	Adidas	Tranzit-Food
Fehérvár	(Germany) Michael Boris	(Hungary) Nemanja Nikolić	Adidas	MOL
Ferencváros	(Russia) Stanislav Cherchesov	(Hungary) Dénes Dibusz	Nike	Magyar Telekom
Gyirmót	(Hungary) Aurél Csertői	(Hungary) Patrik Nagy	Jako	Alcufer; Győr
Honvéd	(Serbia) Nebojša Vignjević	(Hungary) Patrik Hidi	Macron	
Kisvárda	(Hungary) Gábor Erős	(Hungary) Dávid Dombó	Adidas	MasterGood
Mezőkövesd	(Hungary) Attila Supka	(Hungary) Tamás Cseri	Adidas	Zsóry Gyógy- és Strandfürdő
MTK	(Hungary) Gábor Márton	(Hungary) Zsombor Nagy	Nike	Prohuman
Paks	(Hungary) György Bognár	(Hungary) János Szabó	Jako	
Puskás Akadémia	(Slovakia) Zsolt Hornyák	(Hungary) Zsolt Nagy	2Rule	Mészáros & Mészáros
Újpest	(Serbia) Miloš Kruščić	(Serbia) Nikola Mitrović	Puma	
Zalaegerszeg	(Hungary) Róbert Waltner	(Hungary) Benjamin Babati	2Rule	

== League table ==
=== Standings ===
Pos	Team	Pld	W	D	L	GF	GA	GD	Pts	Qualification or relegation
1	Ferencváros (C)	33	22	5	6	60	31	+29	71	Qualification for the Champions League first qualifying round
2	Kisvárda	33	16	11	6	50	34	+16	59	Qualification for the Europa Conference League second qualifying round (Note: Since the winners of the 2021–22 Magyar Kupa, Ferencváros, qualified for the Champions League, the Europa Conference League berth awarded to the Magyar Kupa winners was transferred to the highest-placed Nemzeti Bajnokság I team not already qualified for European competition, the fourth-placed team.)
3	Puskás Akadémia	33	14	12	7	43	34	+9	54	Qualification for the Europa Conference League second qualifying round
4	Fehérvár	33	13	9	11	48	43	+5	48	Qualification for the Europa Conference League second qualifying round
5	Újpest	33	12	8	13	50	48	+2	44	
6	Paks	33	12	7	14	75	63	+12	43	
7	Debrecen	33	10	9	14	45	52	−7	39	
8	Zalaegerszeg	33	10	9	14	44	58	−14	39	
9	Honvéd	33	10	8	15	48	51	−3	38	
10	Mezőkövesd	33	10	8	15	37	49	−12	38	
11	MTK (R)	33	9	9	15	28	50	−22	36	Relegation to the Nemzeti Bajnokság II
12	Gyirmót (R)	33	7	11	15	34	49	−15	32	Relegation to the Nemzeti Bajnokság II

Source: Hungarian Football Federation (in Hungarian), Soccerway
Rules for classification: 1) Points; 2) Matches won; 3) Goal difference; 4) Goals scored; 5) Head-to-head points; 6) Head-to-head goal difference; 7) Head-to-head away goals scored; 8) Fair play ranking; 9) Drawing of lots.
(C) Champions; (R) Relegated

== Fixtures and results ==
=== Rounds 1–22 ===
Home \ Away	DEB	FEH	FER	GYI	HON	KIS	MEZ	MTK	PAK	PUS	UJP	ZAL
Debrecen	—	1–1	2–0	5–0	5–3	0–0	1–4	1–0	1–1	0–3	2–2	1–2
Fehérvár	1–2	—	0–1	3–2	2–1	2–1	1–0	2–1	2–1	0–0	1–2	3–0
Ferencváros	4–2	3–0	—	1–1	1–0	1–2	4–1	0–0	0–3	1–1	3–1	1–2
Gyirmót	0–0	1–1	0–2	—	2–4	1–1	0–1	1–1	2–1	0–1	1–0	0–1
Honvéd	1–4	3–1	0–1	0–1	—	2–1	2–3	3–0	3–1	0–0	1–2	2–2
Kisvárda	2–1	2–1	0–4	2–1	3–2	—	2–0	5–0	3–3	1–1	0–0	5–0
Mezőkövesd	1–0	2–2	0–3	0–0	0–0	0–2	—	1–1	2–1	1–2	2–2	3–2
MTK	1–1	0–2	0–0	0–3	1–0	1–2	1–0	—	1–4	0–1	2–1	0–2
Paks	3–3	3–2	1–3	2–3	2–3	2–2	2–3	3–2	—	4–1	2–1	3–2
Puskás Akadémia	0–2	1–0	1–0	3–0	3–1	0–1	2–0	1–2	1–6	—	2–1	1–1
Újpest	3–1	1–0	0–1	1–3	1–1	0–0	3–1	1–2	4–3	1–2	—	2–2
Zalaegerszeg	2–1	1–1	1–3	2–1	1–3	0–0	1–1	2–0	2–5	1–3	2–0	—

Source: Hungarian Football Federation (in Hungarian), Soccerway
Legend: Blue = home team win; Yellow = draw; Red = away team win.

=== Rounds 23–33 ===
Home \ Away	DEB	FEH	FER	GYI	HON	KIS	MEZ	MTK	PAK	PUS	UJP	ZAL
Debrecen	—	0–3	—	3–1	—	—	—	—	—	1–1	1–2	0–0
Fehérvár	—	—	0–2	—	2–0	5–3	—	—	2–2	2–2	—	—
Ferencváros	3–0	—	—	—	—	2–1	1–0	0–3	—	—	2–1	5–3
Gyirmót	—	0–2	1–2	—	1–1	—	—	1–1	3–3	1–1	—	—
Honvéd	4–2	—	1–2	—	—	1–1	0–0	—	1–1	—	—	—
Kisvárda	1–0	—	—	1–0	—	—	1–2	—	—	—	2–1	2–1
Mezőkövesd	0–1	1–2	—	1–0	—	—	—	—	—	—	2–3	0–0
MTK	3–0	1–1	—	—	1–0	0–0	0–4	—	—	0–0	—	—
Paks	0–1	—	1–2	—	—	0–1	4–0	4–0	—	—	1–3	—
Puskás Akadémia	—	—	2–2	—	1–2	0–0	3–1	—	2–0	—	—	—
Újpest	—	1–1	—	2–2	0–2	—	—	2–0	—	2–1	—	4–0
Zalaegerszeg	—	2–0	—	0–1	3–1	—	—	2–3	2–3	0–0	—	—

Source: Hungarian Football Federation (in Hungarian), Soccerway
Legend: Blue = home team win; Yellow = draw; Red = away team win.

== Statistics ==
=== Top goalscorers ===
Rank	Player	Club	Goals
1	(Hungary) Martin Ádám	Paks	31
2	(Bosnia and Herzegovina) Kenan Kodro	Fehérvár	15
2	(Serbia) Nenad Lukić	Honvéd	15
4	(Morocco) Ryan Mmaee	Ferencváros	13
4	(Hungary) Barnabás Varga	Gyirmót	13
4	(Georgia (country)) Budu Zivzivadze	Újpest	13
7	(Romania) Claudiu Bumba	Kisvárda	11
7	(Bosnia and Herzegovina) Marin Jurina	Mezőkövesd	11
7	(Hungary) Márk Koszta	Zalaegerszeg	11
10	(Hungary) Nemanja Nikolić	Fehérvár	10
10	(Hungary) Roland Ugrai	Debrecen	10

=== Hat-tricks ===
Player	For	Against	Result	Date	Round
(Montenegro) Driton Camaj	Kisvárda	Zalaegerszeg	5–0	31 October 2021	11

== See also ==
- 2021–22 Magyar Kupa
- 2021–22 Nemzeti Bajnokság II
- 2021–22 Nemzeti Bajnokság III
- 2021–22 Megyei Bajnokság I
