= Patrik Kovács (footballer, born 2005) =

Hungarian footballer

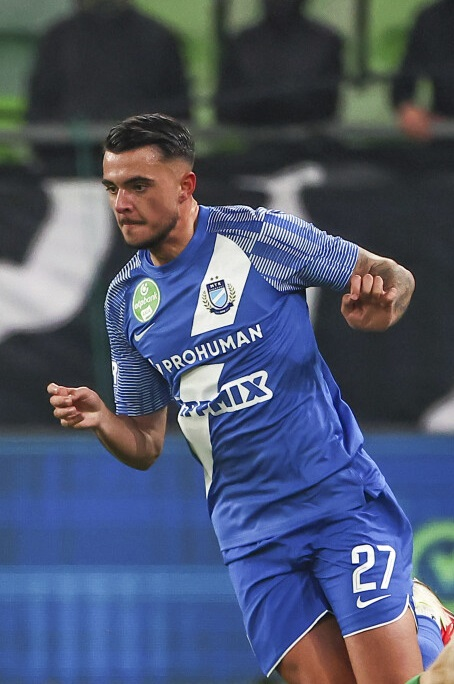
- Kovács playing for MTK in 2025

Personal information
- Date of birth: 9 February 2005 (age 21)
- Place of birth: Budapest, Hungary
- Position: Defender

Team information
- Current team: MTK
- Number: 27

Youth career
- 2010–2011: Gyáli Lurkó
- 2011–2015: Gloriett
- 2015–2020: Ferencváros
- 2020–2021: MTK
- 2021–2023: Red Bull Salzburg

Senior career*
Years	Team	Apps	(Gls)
2022	FC Liefering	1	(0)
2023–	MTK	71	(2)
2023–2025	MTK II	7	(2)

International career^{‡}
2019–2020	Hungary U16	3	(0)
2021–2022	Hungary U17	6	(0)
2022–2024	Hungary U19	11	(0)
2024	Hungary U20	2	(0)
2025–	Hungary U21	4	(0)
- * Club domestic league appearances and goals as of 19 May 2026 ‡ National team caps and goals as of 18 November 2025

Patrik Kovács (born 9 February 2005) is a Hungarian professional footballer who plays as a defender for Nemzeti Bajnokság I club MTK, and the Hungary U21 national team.

== Career ==
On 16 June 2021, during his youth career, Kovács signed a three-year contract with Austrian club Red Bull Salzburg, which became involved in his development as one of Hungary's emerging talents.

On 9 June 2023, he returned to newly promoted Nemzeti Bajnokság I club MTK, signing a three-year contract. While under contract with Red Bull Salzburg, he played for their reserve team FC Liefering before becoming a free agent upon the contract's expiration. On 10 April 2025, Kovács extended his contract until summer 2028.

== Career statistics ==
=== Club ===
As of match played 11 February 2026

Appearances and goals by club, season and competition
Club	Season	League			Magyar Kupa		Total	
Club	Season	Division	Apps	Goals	Apps	Goals	Apps	Goals
FC Liefering	2021–22	2. Liga	1	0	—		1	0
MTK	2023–24	Nemzeti Bajnokság I	18	0	3	3	21	3
MTK	2024–25	Nemzeti Bajnokság I	27	1	4	0	31	1
MTK	2025–26	Nemzeti Bajnokság I	18	1	2	2	20	3
MTK	Total		63	2	9	5	72	7
MTK II	2023–24	Nemzeti Bajnokság III	6	2	—		6	2
MTK II	2024–25	Nemzeti Bajnokság III	1	0	—		1	0
MTK II	Total		7	2	—		7	2
Career total			71	4	9	5	80	9

=== International ===
Appearances and goals by national team and year
Team	Year	Total	
Team	Year	Apps	Goals
Hungary U16	2019	2	0
Hungary U16	2020	1	0
Hungary U16	Total	3	0
Hungary U17	2021	4	0
Hungary U17	2022	2	0
Hungary U17	Total	6	0
Hungary U19	2022	4	0
Hungary U19	2023	6	0
Hungary U19	2024	1	0
Hungary U19	Total	11	0
Hungary U20	2024	2	0
Hungary U21	2025	4	0
Career total		26	0
