= Rajmund Molnár =

Hungarian footballer (born 2002)

Personal information
- Date of birth: 28 August 2002 (age 24)
- Place of birth: Budapest, Hungary
- Height: 1.85 m (6 ft 1 in)
- Position: Forward

Team information
- Current team: Pogoń Szczecin
- Number: 9

Youth career
- 2008–2010: Vecsés
- 2010–2023: Honvéd
- 2013–2016: MTK
- 2016–2019: Honvéd

Senior career*
Years	Team	Apps	(Gls)
2019–2021	Benfica	0	(0)
2021	→ Győr (loan)	4	(1)
2021–2022	Csákvár	31	(9)
2022–2024	Haladás	35	(15)
2023–2024	→ MTK (loan)	19	(3)
2024–2025	MTK	34	(10)
2025–	Pogoń Szczecin	10	(3)

International career
2017–2018	Hungary U16	10	(2)
2018–2019	Hungary U17	10	(2)
2019	Hungary U18	2	(0)
2024	Hungary U21	2	(0)
- * Club domestic league appearances and goals as of 09:11, 30 May 2026 (UTC)

Rajmund Molnár (born 28 August 2002) is a Hungarian professional footballer who plays as a forward for Ekstraklasa club Pogoń Szczecin. He represented Hungary at youth level.

== Career ==
=== MTK ===
On 7 June 2023, Molnár joined Nemzeti Bajnokság I club MTK on a loan deal for the 2023–24 season. On 18 June 2024, he completed his permanent move to MTK by signing an unknown-term contract.

On 9 August 2025, he scored the first hat-trick of the 2025–26 Nemzeti Bajnokság I season in their 5–0 victory over Diósgyőr.

=== Pogoń Szczecin ===
On 30 August 2025, Molnár signed for Polish club Pogoń Szczecin in the Ekstraklasa on a three-year deal, with an option to extend by a further year, for a reported transfer fee between €1 million and €2 million.

He debuted for Pogoń in a 1–0 league loss to Korona Kielce at the Stadion Miejski on 13 September 2025. He scored his first goal in a 3–4 defeat against Lechia Gdańsk at the Florian Krygier Municipal Stadium on 21 September. His goal was voted the most spectacular goal of 2025 by the official website of Ekstraklasa. Molnár suffered an anterior cruciate ligament injury during a Polish Cup game against Widzew Łódź on 2 December 2025. In January 2026, it was announced he would be sidelined for the remainder of the season.

== International career ==
On 26 August 2025, Molnár received his first call-up to the Hungary senior national team by head coach Marco Rossi, for the 2026 FIFA World Cup qualification matches against Republic of Ireland and Portugal.

== Career statistics ==
As of match played 2 December 2025

Appearances and goals by club, season and competition
Club	Season	League			National cup (Note: Includes Magyar Kupa, Polish Cup)		Other		Total	
Club	Season	Division	Apps	Goals	Apps	Goals	Apps	Goals	Apps	Goals
Győr II (loan)	2020–21	Megyei Bajnokság I	7	5	—		2 (Note: Appearances in Megyei Bajnokság I promotion play-offs)	0	9	5
Győr (loan)	2020–21	Nemzeti Bajnokság II	4	1	—		—		4	1
Csákvár	2021–22	Nemzeti Bajnokság II	31	9	3	1	—		34	10
Haladás	2022–23	Nemzeti Bajnokság II	35	15	2	0	—		37	15
MTK (loan)	2023–24	Nemzeti Bajnokság I	19	3	2	3	—		21	6
MTK	2024–25	Nemzeti Bajnokság I	29	5	3	2	—		32	7
MTK	2025–26	Nemzeti Bajnokság I	5	5	—		—		5	5
MTK	Total		53	13	5	5	—		58	18
MTK II (loan)	2023–24	Nemzeti Bajnokság III	1	1	—		—		1	1
MTK II	2024–25	Nemzeti Bajnokság III	1	1	—		—		1	1
MTK II	Total		2	2	—		—		2	2
Pogoń Szczecin	2025–26	Ekstraklasa	10	3	2	0	—		12	3
Career total			142	48	12	6	2	0	156	54

== Honours ==
Győr II

- Megyei Bajnokság I: 2020–21
- Megyei Bajnokság I promotion play-offs: 2021
