= Viktor Hey (footballer, born 1974) =

Ukrainian footballer

Personal information
- Full name: Viktor Ferentsovych Hey
- Date of birth: 17 April 1974 (age 52)
- Place of birth: Zakarpattia Oblast, Ukrainian SSR, Soviet Union
- Height: 1.80 m (5 ft 11 in)
- Position: Midfielder

Senior career*
| Years | Team | Apps | (Gls) |
| 1995–1998 | Karpaty Mukacheve | 99 | (16) |
| 1998–2003 | Zakarpattia Uzhhorod | 124 | (8) |
| 2001 | → Zakarpattia-2 Uzhhorod | 17 | (1) |
| 2004–2005 | Polyana | 7 | (4) |
- * Club domestic league appearances and goals

Viktor Ferentsovych Hey (Ukrainian: Віктор Ференцович Гей; born 17 April 1974) is a Ukrainian retired professional football player.

== Career ==
Hey spent all his playing career in his native Zakarpattia Oblast clubs, including FC Zakarpattia Uzhhorod in the Ukrainian Premier League.

== Personal life ==
After the football career he is involved in the local politic as a member of the Party of Regions. His son, also named Viktor, is a professional footballer, too.
