= István Bognár =

Hungarian footballer (born 1991)

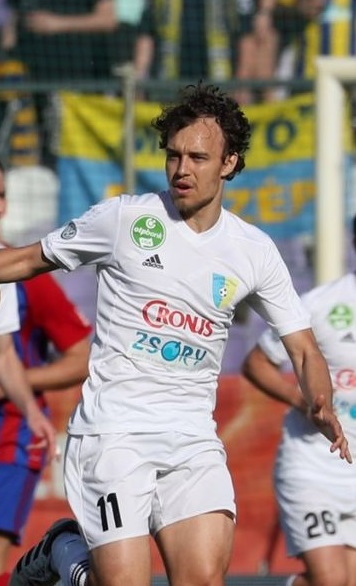
- Bognár playing for Mezőkövesd in 2018

Personal information
- Date of birth: 5 May 1991 (age 35)
- Place of birth: Liège, Belgium
- Height: 1.75 m (5 ft 9 in)
- Position: Attacking midfielder

Team information
- Current team: MTK
- Number: 10

Youth career
- 1997–2003: MAC Népstadion
- 2003–2004: Újpest
- 2004–2005: Újbuda
- 2005–2007: MTK
- 2007–2010: Vasas

Senior career*
Years	Team	Apps	(Gls)
2009–2012	Újpest	2	(0)
2009–2012	Újpest II	41	(9)
2012–2014	Mezőkövesd	53	(11)
2014–2017	Diósgyőr	60	(7)
2017–2018	Ferencváros	14	(1)
2018	Mezőkövesd	14	(1)
2018–2020	MTK	49	(12)
2020–2022	Paks	48	(16)
2022	→ Aris Limassol (loan)	9	(1)
2022–	MTK	116	(24)
- * Club domestic league appearances and goals as of 30 May 2026

István Bognár (born 6 May 1991) is a Hungarian professional footballer who plays as a midfielder for Nemzeti Bajnokság I club MTK.

== Club career ==
He played in Újpest FC B, but was a member of Újpest FC first squad. He is the son of former Hungarian international player György Bognár.

=== Ferencváros ===
On 10 January 2017, Bognár was signed by Nemzeti Bajnokság I club Ferencvárosi TC. Two days later it was also revealed that Ferencváros did not pay for Bognár for Diósgyőri VTK because the two clubs rather exchanged their two players. Busai was exchanged for Bognár by the two clubs.

=== Aris Limassol ===
On 1 February 2022, Bognár joined Aris Limassol in Cyprus on loan.

== International career ==
He was called up to the senior Hungary squad to face Faroe Islands in August 2016.

== Career statistics ==
As of 15 May 2021

Appearances and goals by club, season and competition
Club	Season	League			Cup		League Cup		Europe		Total	
Club	Season	Division	Apps	Goals	Apps	Goals	Apps	Goals	Apps	Goals	Apps	Goals
Vasas	2009–10	Nemzeti Bajnokság I	0	0	1	0	1	0	0	0	2	0
Újpest	2010–11	Nemzeti Bajnokság I	1	0	1	0	2	0	0	0	4	0
Újpest	2011–12	Nemzeti Bajnokság I	1	0	0	0	1	1	0	0	2	1
Újpest	Total		2	0	1	0	3	1	0	0	6	1
Újpest II	2010–11	Nemzeti Bajnokság II	23	5	0	0	0	0	0	0	23	5
Újpest II	2011–12	Nemzeti Bajnokság II	18	4	0	0	0	0	0	0	18	4
Újpest II	Total		41	9	0	0	0	0	0	0	41	9
Mezőkövesd	2012–13	Nemzeti Bajnokság II	29	9	2	1	0	0	0	0	31	10
Mezőkövesd	2013–14	Nemzeti Bajnokság I	24	2	3	0	6	4	0	0	33	6
Mezőkövesd	2017–18	Nemzeti Bajnokság I	14	1	0	0	0	0	0	0	14	1
Mezőkövesd	Total		67	12	5	1	6	4	0	0	78	17
Diósgyőr	2014–15	Nemzeti Bajnokság I	22	2	3	1	5	2	4	0	34	5
Diósgyőr	2015–16	Nemzeti Bajnokság I	27	2	2	3	0	0	0	0	29	5
Diósgyőr	2016–17	Nemzeti Bajnokság I	18	4	3	0	0	0	0	0	21	4
Diósgyőr	Total		67	8	8	4	5	2	4	0	84	14
Ferencváros	2016–17	Nemzeti Bajnokság I	14	0	7	2	0	0	0	0	21	2
Ferencváros	2017–18	Nemzeti Bajnokság I	0	0	1	0	0	0	0	0	1	0
Ferencváros	Total		14	0	8	2	0	0	0	0	22	2
MTK Budapest	2018–19	Nemzeti Bajnokság I	33	5	1	1	0	0	0	0	34	6
MTK Budapest	2019–20	Nemzeti Bajnokság II	16	7	6	2	0	0	0	0	22	9
MTK Budapest	Total		49	12	7	3	0	0	0	0	56	15
Paks	2020–21	Nemzeti Bajnokság I	30	10	3	0	0	0	0	0	33	10
Career total			270	51	33	10	15	7	4	0	322	68

== Honours ==
Individual

- Nemzeti Bajnokság I Player of the Month: October 2025
