= Örökrangadó =

Hungarian association football derby

- Other names: Ferencváros vs. MTK Budapest
- Location: Hungary
- Teams: Ferencváros; MTK Budapest
- Latest meeting: Ferencváros 1–1 MTK Budapest
- Broadcasters: M4 Sport (Hungary)

Statistics
- Most wins: Ferencváros (92)

The fixture between Ferencvárosi TC and MTK Budapest is a local derby, Örökrangadó (in Hungarian), in Budapest, Hungary and a fierce rivalry.

== Naming ==
The term 'örökrangadó' has been used since 1935. Before that, the English word 'derby' was used to describe the rivalry between MTK and Ferencváros, with 'örök’ meaning 'eternal'. In 1931, the sports newspaper Nemzeti Sport in Hungary announced a contest to invent Hungarian words for English sport expressions. The competition for derby was won by Gyula Bendekovits, a barber from Salgótarján. Other possible terms were helyosztó, éltusa, újudvar, and színe-java.

== 1903-1945 ==
The first match between Ferencváros and MTK was played in the 1903 Nemzeti Bajnokság I season on 1 March 1903 at Millenáris Sporttelep. The match was won by Ferencváros (3–1). At the end of the season Ferencváros won their first ever national championship, while MTK finished 3rd. The following season, it was MTK who tasted gold for the very first time, as they finished 1 point above Ferencváros.

In 1908, MTK won the league unbeaten, and would set a record of 9 consecutive titles between 1917 and 1925. Their hegemony would be broken by Ferencváros, who completed a three-peat between 1926 and 1928. In October 1924, MTK handed FTC a humiliating 11–2 defeat at Hungária körút, in front of 20,000 spectators. György Orth found the back of the net 5 times, while György Molnár scored a hat-trick.

In 1929, MTK finished 1 point above FTC. Going into the 1930s, MTK had the upper hand over Ferencváros, with 13 league titles under their belt, while their green and white rivals had 11.

Until 1931, the fixture between the Ferencváros and MTK Budapest was called by the English word "derby". However, from 1935 the term Örökrangadó was used which was coined by Gyula Bendekovics, a barber assistant, in a contest organised by a sports paper.

In 1932, Ferencváros won the league undefeated, with a 100% win-record, winning all 22 of their fixtures. They dismantled MTK 4-2 and 5-1 during the season.

MTK won the 1932 Hungarian Cup, by defeating FTC 4–3, in a game where Ferencváros scrambled a 0–2 lead. 3 years later, the team from the 9th district exacted revenge, as they beat MTK in the 1935 Hungarian cup final.

In September 1935, MTK defeated Ferencváros at home for the first time in 11 years, as they beat FTC 3–2 at Hungária körút.

in 1940, as a response to the tighter restrictions on Jewish people in Hungary, MTK disbanded, due to the club's heavy Jewish affiliation. After the Second World War ended, MTK were founded again in 1945, and saw some success, namely winning the 1951, 1953 and 1957/58 national championships, and would not leave the top 3 for 10 seasons.

However, by 1941, Ferencváros had overtaken MTK in terms of national championships, winning their 16th league title, and while MTK faced a title-drought after 1958, that spanned nearly three decades, Ferencváros, who had a title-drought of their own, between 1949 and 1963, won an additional 6 national championships by the time MTK were champions again, in 1987.

In May 1945, the first Örökrangadó was held since MTK's disbandment, and MTK won the encounter 1–0 at Üllői út, with a goal by Károly Palatinus.

== 1945-1987 ==
Between April 1949 and May 1953 MTK recorded 10 consecutive victories over Ferencváros in the league. Many of these victories were heavy defeats for Ferencváros, such as a 6–1 on two occasions in May 1950 and May 1951.

In the 1952 season, MTK recorded two high-scoring victories in the Örökrangadó. In April they defeated Ferencváros 4–0, and in November MTK hammered Ferencváros 5–0 at Üllői út, thanks to a hat-trick from János Molnár, handing FTC their most serious home defeat since Újpest beat them with the same scoreline in May 1949.

In May 1954 FTC ended their seven-year winless run against MTK, and defeated MTK 3–1 at the Népstadion in front of 70,000 spectators.

In 1958 MTK won another league-title, while FTC finished third. MTK defeated FTC 2–1 on the penultimate day of the season. In August 1958 MTK defeated FTC 1–0 in the opening round of the season, marking their fifth consecutive Örökrangadó victory.

In May 1959 FTC overcame MTK 1–0 to win their first Örökrangadó in five years.

In 1963, Ferencváros finished 6 points above MTK, to end their league-title drought which had been harrowing the club since 1949. They would add four more league-titles to their already stacked trophy cabinet in the 1960s decade.

In October 1965 FTC hammered MTK 6–1, with Flórián Albert scoring a hat-trick. The green and whites would top this result the following season, as in October 1966, Ferencváros beat MTK 7‐1, their highest scoring victory in the eternal derby.

In October 1967 Ferencváros shut out MTK 5–0, marking their sixth consecutive Örökrangadó victory for the first time ever.

In the 1968 season FTC won the league while staying undefeated at home. Both of that season's Örökrangadós ended 0-0.

In May 1969 the teams played a memorable 7-goal game, as FTC overcame MTK 4–3 at Hungária körút.

In November 1975 Ferencváros defeated MTK 3–1 at Hungária körút. All four goals were scored within the first 22 minutes of the game, as MTK took the lead through Takács, but Ferencváros swiftly turned the game around.

In 1976, Ferencváros beat MTK in the final of the Hungarian Cup 1‐0. This year FTC achieved the double, as they had also won the league, breaking Úpest's hegemony in the championship. MTK finished 6th.

In May 1977 the teams contested another classic at the Népstadion. FTC took the lead through Vad, but MTK managed to first equalise, then take the advantage thanks to a brace from Tibor Kiss, and a strike from Borsó. Ferencváros found themselves two goals down with 4 minutes to go, but thanks to a brace from Ebedli in two minutes, they managed to salvage a point in spectacular fashion, as the game ended 3-3.

In 1981, Ferencváros won their first league title in 5 years, after finishing 3 points above Tatabánya. In April 1981 Ferencváros won the Örökrangadó 4–2 after a Nyilasi brace. MTK finished 17th, and were relegated for the first time in 40 years. By 1983, they had been promoted as champions of the 2nd division, and MTK defeated FTC at home for the first time since 1961, after beating the green and whites 4‐0.

In 1987 MTK ended their league-trophy drought of 29 years, and won the 1st division after finishing 3 points above Újpest, while Ferencváros finished 6th.

== 1987-2006 ==
In June 1988 FTC beat MTK 2-0 thanks to a brace by Pál Fischer within four minutes.

In October 1990 Ferencváros achieved a 4–0 victory against MTK. Pál Fischer yet again scored a brace, this time, within two minutes.

In 1991, MTK achieved their first win at FTC's stadium since 1970, after going down 1-0 early on, Balog equalized for the red and blues, and Morozov scored the winning goal in the 85th minute.

In May 1993, the sides met at Hungária körút in the 26th round, and produced an over-the-top game. After going down 4–0 within the first half, MTK eventually won the game 4–3, after Ferencváros came close to completing the comeback. The game saw two red cards, as Talapa from MTK and András Telek from FTC were sent off just five minutes apart.

In June 1996, MTK beat FTC 2-1 from behind, as they became the fourth team that season to defeat Ferencváros at home, as the green and whites won their 26th national championship.

In 1997, MTK won their 20th league title, achieving a record-high point tally of 85, finishing 11 points above 3rd place Ferencváros. On Matchday 3 of the 1996/97 season MTK bashed FTC 3–0 at Üllői út, becoming the first Budapest-based club to win a league game in the 9th district since BVSC in November 1995. Krisztián Kenesei scored a brace.

In August 1998 the teams played a violent encounter at Üllői út. The game itself featured 6 yellow cards, and one player from both teams getting sent off. MTK quickly took a 2-goal lead by the 24th minute, and held on to their lead until the 74th minute but Ferencváros completed an improbable comeback, with the equaliser being scored in the 88th minute. The game ended 2-2. In the return fixture MTK ended Ferencváros' 5-match unbeaten run in the league, and defeated the green and whites 2–0, in March 1999.

At the end of the 1998/99 season MTK finished 19 points above runners-up Ferencváros, and claimed their 21st title.

In September 1999 Ferencváros defeated MTK 1–0 with a 90' minute goal by Mihály Tóth, and won their first Örökrangadó in over three years.

In 2000, FTC claimed their first victory at Hungária körút since 1992, after beating MTK 2‐3.

In May 2001, MTK thrashed Ferencváros 5–2 at Hungária körút, Ferencváros' only away defeat in the 2000-01 Nemzeti Bajnokság I season. At the end of the campaign Ferencváros won their 27th league title.

Although MTK won the regular season of the 2001/02 season, they finished 3rd place in the 2nd round, behind first-time winners Zalaegerszeg, and Ferencváros. In December 2001 MTK defeated Ferencváros 3–1 at Üllői út, handing the green and whites their fifth home defeat of the season. Béla Illés scored a brace.

In 2003, MTK won the league for a third time in 6 years, after finishing 2 points above Ferencváros. FTC were the only team to defeat MTK twice during the season, as they beat them 1–0 at Hungária Körút with Zoltán Gera's goal, (one of MTK's two home defeats), and overcame them at Üllői út 2–1. MTK claimed their 22nd league title on the last day of the season, after coming away with a 1–0 victory from Ferenc Szusza Stadium with a goal from Roland Juhász, while Ferencváros were unable to get the best of DVSC in a goalless draw.

MTK also defeated Ferencváros 2‐0 in the 2003 Hungarian Supercup. This marked the first time MTK beat their green and white neighbours in a final since 1932.

In 2004, Ferencváros won the league again, after finishing one point above arch-rivals Újpest. MTK finished 6th.

In April 2004, MTK handed Ferencváros their first defeat of the Pintér-era, as they defeated FTC 1–0. The game saw four red cards, as Ferencváros finished the match with 8 men, while MTK's Sándor Torghelle was also shown a red card in the 90th minute. A couple of weeks later Ferencváros sought revenge at home, as they defeated MTK 2–0 with a brace from Gera.

In 2005, Ferencváros and MTK finished on equal points (56), and finished 2nd and 3rd respectively, as Debreceni VSC became the first eastern Hungarian team to win the top-flight. The first Örökrangadó of the season ended 2–1 to Ferencváros, in August 2004. MTK won the return leg 3–1, after being down 1–0 with 11 minutes to go. Gábor Bori scored a brace within just one minute to miraculously turn the game around, while Zoltán Pullák put the game to bed in the 91st minute.

In September 2005 Ferencváros scrambled a two-goal lead at Hungária körút, despite being 2–0 up before half-time. MTK pulled one back in the 57th minute, and eventually equalised just two minutes later. The game ended 2-2 and saw two penalty kicks.

In April 2006, FTC beat MTK 1-0 thanks to a successful penalty conversion by Péter Lipcsei in the 81st minute.

== 2006- ==
In 2006, Ferencváros were relegated from the 1st division for the first time in their history, and MTK achieved their 23rd top-flight title, and their most recent, in 2008. Ferencváros returned to the top division in 2009, and won their first league title in 12 years in 2016.

In September 2009 the first Örökrangadó was held in over three and a half years. Ferencváros won the fixture 2–1 at Üllői út. The game saw 9 yellow cards.

In October 2010 Ferencváros slayed MTK 3–0, in a game where MTK's László Sütő scored two own goals within the first 25 minutes.

In November 2012 the two teams contested the 200th Eternal Derby. Until the 90th minute, the game looked poised to end in a draw, as the score was 2-2. However, Sándor Hidvégi and Norbert Könyves proceeded to score two goals in two minutes, winning the game for MTK 4–2 in one of the most clutch Örökrangadó victories in recent memory.

In March 2014 MTK defeated Ferencváros 3–2 at Hungária körút. The encounter saw 8 bookings, including a red card for Julian Jenner.

In September 2016 10-men MTK defeated FTC 2–1, with a 90+2 minute goal from Sándor Torghelle, who had received a yellow card just minutes prior. The match saw 6 yellow and one red card.

In 2022, MTK defeated FTC at the Üllői út for the first time in 20 years, after beating the green and whites 0‐3.

In the 2018–19 Nemzeti Bajnokság I the two clubs met for the first time on 29 July 2018 and the match was won by Ferencváros 1–4.

In the 2022–23 Nemzeti Bajnokság I season, the derby was not held since MTK were relegated in the previous season; therefore, they competed in the 2022–23 Nemzeti Bajnokság II season in which they finished second, thus, they were promoted to the first division.

On 30 September 2023, Ferencváros beat 6–1 MTK at the Hidegkuti Stadium after one season without the derby.

On 1 November 2025, Keane-led Ferencváros beat MTK 4–1 at their home stadium. Gartenmann scored first followed by Szalai, Varga, and B. Nagy. The only MTK goal was scored by Ferencváros player Cadu as an own goal.

The two teams have met in over 200 league games, with Ferencváros winning 93 "Eternal Derbies", and MTK being victorious on 77 occasions, the most league victories against FTC by any Hungarian team.

== All time league results ==
Ferencváros win Draw MTK win

	Ferencváros – MTK Budapest				MTK Budapest – Ferencváros			
Season	Date	Venue	Score	Attendance	Date	Venue	Score	Attendance
1903	01–03–1903	Millenáris	3 – 1		22–11–1903	Millenáris	0 – 3	
1904	10–04–1904		3 – 0		02–10–1904		1 – 1	
1905	26–11–1905		0 – 0		25–03–1905		2 – 2	
1906–07	04–10–1906		2 – 0		26–05–1907		2 – 2	
1907–08	23–02–1908		2 – 0		22–09–1907		3 – 3	
1908–09	07–03–1909		1 – 0		08–11–1908		2 – 4	
1909–10	24–10–1909		3 – 3		08–05–1910		0 – 2	
1910–11	12–02–1911		2 – 1		27–11–1910		2 – 1	
1911–12	26–11–1911		0 – 0		31–03–1912		1 – 0	
1912–13	13–10–1912		2 – 2		16–03–1913		1 – 3	
2004–05	29–08–2004		2 – 1	4,883	03–04–2005	Hidegkuti Nándor Stadion	3 – 1	3,000
2005–06	02–04–2006		1 – 0		25–09–2005		2 – 2	
2009–10	13–09–2009		2 – 1		10–04–2010		1 – 1	
2010–11	01–10–2010		3 – 0		24–04–2011		1 – 3	
2012–13	18–05–2012	ETO Park	2 – 0	3,500	03–11–2012	Hidegkuti Nándor Stadion	4 – 2	4,500
2013–14	17–08–2013	Puskás Ferenc Stadion	2 – 0	8,490	08–03–2014	Hidegkuti Nándor Stadion	3 – 2	4,500
2014–15	22–03–2015	Groupama Aréna	2 – 0	8,973	31–08–2014	Bozsik Stadion	2 – 1	1,200
2015–16	15–08–2015	Groupama Aréna	2 – 0	6,817	21–11–2015	Illovszky Rudolf Stadion	1 – 0	2,114
2015–16	16–04–2016	Groupama Aréna	2 – 2	5,043				
2016–17	10–12–2016	Groupama Aréna	1 – 1	4,754	10–09–2016	Eszperantó úti Stadion	2 – 1	1,117
2016–17					06–05–2017	Hidegkuti Nándor Stadion	1 – 3	4,368
2018–19	03–11–2018	Groupama Aréna	2 – 0	11,067	29–07–2018	Hidegkuti Nándor Stadion	1 – 4	4,079
2018–19					09–03–2019	Hidegkuti Nándor Stadion	1 – 3	4,587
2020–21	28–11–2020	Groupama Aréna	2 – 0	0	14–08–2020	Hidegkuti Nándor Stadion	1 – 1	4,445
2020–21					27–02–2021	Hidegkuti Nándor Stadion	2 – 2	0
2021–22	24–10–2021	Groupama Aréna	0 – 0	6,907	19–02–2022	Hidegkuti Nándor Stadion	0 – 0	4,826
2021–22	07–05–2022	Groupama Aréna	0 – 3	13,199				
2023–24	06–02–2024	Groupama Aréna	5 – 1	7,014	30–09–2023	Hidegkuti Nándor Stadion	1 – 6	5,322
2023–24					04–28–2024	Hidegkuti Nándor Stadion	1 – 2	4,638

== Statistics ==
=== Statistics ===
Competition	Ferencváros wins	Draws	MTK wins
Nemzeti Bajnokság I	90	54	76
Magyar Kupa	2	1	2
Total	92	55	78

== Players who played for both clubs ==
=== From Ferencváros to MTK ===
- (Hungary) Bence Batik
- (Hungary) Barnabás Bese
- (Hungary) Norbert Csiki
- (Hungary) Lajos Hegedűs
- (Hungary) Gábor Pölöskei
- (Hungary) Alfréd Schaffer
- (Hungary) Imre Schlosser
- (Hungary) Krisztián Timár
- (Hungary) Roland Varga
- (Serbia) Dragan Vukmir
- (Hungary) Ferenc Weisz
- (Jamaica) Rafe Wolfe
- (Hungary) Gábor Zavadszky

=== From MTK to Ferencváros ===
- (Hungary) Attila Busai
- (Hungary) Ákos Buzsáky
- (Hungary) Ádám Pintér

== See also ==
- Derby of Budapest
- Ferencvárosi TC
- MTK Budapest FC
