= Benedek Varju =

Hungarian footballer

Personal information
- Full name: Benedek Varju
- Date of birth: 21 May 2001 (age 25)
- Place of birth: Győr, Hungary
- Height: 1.73 m (5 ft 8 in)
- Position: Central midfielder

Team information
- Current team: MTK Budapest
- Number: 2

Youth career
- 2007–2009: Abda SC
- 2009–2017: Győr
- 2017–2018: MTK Budapest

Senior career*
Years	Team	Apps	(Gls)
2017–	MTK Budapest	164	(8)
2017–2018	→ MTK Budapest II	13	(1)
2020	→ Dorog (loan)	2	(0)

International career^{‡}
2017–2018	Hungary U-16	4	(1)
2017–2018	Hungary U-17	17	(1)
2017–2019	Hungary U-18	11	(0)
2019–2021	Hungary U-19	5	(0)
2021–	Hungary U-21	5	(0)
- * Club domestic league appearances and goals as of 30 May 2026 ‡ National team caps and goals as of 15 May 2021

Benedek Varju (born 21 May 2001) is a Hungarian professional footballer who plays for MTK Budapest FC.

== Career statistics ==
Appearances and goals by club, season and competition
Club	Season	League			Cup		Europe		Total	
Club	Season	Division	Apps	Goals	Apps	Goals	Apps	Goals	Apps	Goals
MTK Budapest II	2017–18	Nemzeti Bajnokság III	9	1	—		—		9	1
MTK Budapest
MTK Budapest	2017–18	Nemzeti Bajnokság II	1	0	0	0	—		1	0
MTK Budapest	2018–19	Nemzeti Bajnokság I	1	0	0	0	—		1	0
MTK Budapest	2019–20	Nemzeti Bajnokság II	19	1	6	0	—		25	1
MTK Budapest	2020–21	Nemzeti Bajnokság I	18	0	4	0	—		22	0
MTK Budapest	Total		39	1	10	0	0	0	49	1
Dorog	2020–21	Nemzeti Bajnokság II	2	0	0	0	—		2	0
Career total			50	2	10	0	0	0	60	2

Updated to games played as of 15 May 2021.
