= Artúr Horváth =

Hungarian footballer (born 2003)

Personal information
- Date of birth: 2 October 2003 (age 23)
- Place of birth: Szeged, Hungary
- Height: 1.88 m (6 ft 2 in)
- Position: Defensive midfielder

Team information
- Current team: FK Csíkszereda (on loan from MTK Budapest)
- Number: 11

Youth career
- 2011–2014: Tisza Volán
- 2014–2017: SZEOL
- 2017–2018: Vasas
- 2018–2023: MTK Budapest

Senior career*
Years	Team	Apps	(Gls)
2021–2024	MTK Budapest II	34	(2)
2022–	MTK Budapest	94	(7)
2026–	→ FK Csíkszereda (loan)	9	(0)

International career
2019–2020	Hungary U17	3	(0)
2021	Hungary U18	1	(0)
2021–2022	Hungary U19	7	(0)
2023–2024	Hungary U21	4	(0)
- * Club domestic league appearances and goals as of 7 November 2026

Artúr Horváth (born 2 October 2003) is a Hungarian professional footballer who plays as a defensive midfielder for Liga I club FK Csíkszereda, on loan from Nemzeti Bajnokság I club MTK Budapest.
