= Bence Végh =

Hungarian footballer

Personal information
- Date of birth: 13 May 1997 (age 29)
- Place of birth: Ászár, Hungary
- Height: 1.89 m (6 ft 2 in)
- Positions: Defensive midfielder; centre-back

Youth career
- 2007–2008: Ászár KSE
- 2008–2015: Győr

Senior career*
Years	Team	Apps	(Gls)
2015–2021	Komárom	162	(21)
2021–2023	Mosonmagyaróvár	68	(12)
2023–2025	MTK Budapest	49	(2)
2025–2026	FK Csíkszereda	30	(0)
- * Club domestic league appearances and goals as of 1 May 2026

Bence Végh (born 13 May 1997) is a Hungarian professional footballer who plays as a defensive midfielder or a centre-back.

== Honours ==
Komárom

- Megyei Bajnokság I: 2015–16, 2017–18

Mosonmagyaróvár

- Nemzeti Bajnokság III: 2021–22
