= Márk Kosznovszky =

Hungarian footballer (born 2002)

Personal information
- Date of birth: 17 April 2002 (age 24)
- Place of birth: Budapest, Hungary
- Height: 1.79 m (5 ft 10 in)
- Position: Midfielder

Team information
- Current team: Portsmouth
- Number: 18

Youth career
- –2019: MTK

Senior career*
Years	Team	Apps	(Gls)
2019–2021	Parma	1	(0)
2021–2025	MTK Budapest	49	(4)
2022	→ Tiszakécske (loan)	17	(1)
2022–2023	→ Kozármisleny (loan)	33	(3)
2025–	Portsmouth	15	(0)

International career
2017	Hungary U16	3	(0)
2019	Hungary U17	12	(1)
2019	Hungary U18	1	(0)
2022–2024	Hungary U21	12	(1)
- * Club domestic league appearances and goals as of 10:20, 12 August 2026 (UTC)

Márk Kosznovszky (born 17 April 2002) is a Hungarian professional footballer who plays as a midfielder for EFL Championship club Portsmouth.

== Club career ==
In 2019, Kosznovszky signed for Italian Serie A side Parma, where he made one appearance. On 22 May 2021, he debuted for Parma during a 3–0 loss to Sampdoria.

In 2021, Kosznovszky signed for MTK in the Hungarian top flight. Before the second half of 2021–22, he was sent on loan to Hungarian second-tier club Tiszakécske. For the 2022–23 season, Kosznovszky was loaned to the second tier once again, this time to Kozármisleny.

=== Portsmouth ===
On 25 July 2025, Kosznovszky signed for English EFL Championship club Portsmouth on a three-year deal for an undisclosed fee.

== International career ==
Kosznovszky represented Hungary at the 2019 UEFA European Under-17 Championship and the 2019 FIFA U-17 World Cup.
