= Gergő Kocsis =

Hungarian footballer

Personal information
- Full name: Gergő Bence Kocsis
- Date of birth: 7 March 1994 (age 32)
- Place of birth: Budapest, Hungary
- Height: 1.88 m (6 ft 2 in)
- Position: Centre-back

Team information
- Current team: Jaro
- Number: 25

Youth career
- 2005–2009: MTK Budapest
- 2009–2012: Stuttgart
- 2012–2013: Augsburg

Senior career*
Years	Team	Apps	(Gls)
2012–2014	Augsburg II	7	(1)
2014–2015	Videoton	1	(0)
2015–2016	Puskás Akadémia	3	(0)
2016–2018	DAC Dunajská Streda	3	(0)
2017–2018	→ Diósgyőr (loan)	25	(0)
2018–2019	Karviná	2	(0)
2019–2020	Zalaegerszeg	44	(1)
2020–2021	Podbeskidzie Bielsko-Biała	19	(0)
2021–2022	Mezőkövesd	20	(0)
2022–2024	MTK Budapest	50	(2)
2024–2025	Debrecen	17	(0)
2025–2026	Videoton	24	(2)
2026–	Jaro	6	(0)

International career
2014	Hungary U20	1	(0)
2014–2015	Hungary U21	8	(1)
- * Club domestic league appearances and goals as of 13 November 2026

Gergő Kocsis (born 7 March 1994) is a Hungarian professional footballer who plays as a centre-back for Veikkausliiga club Jaro.

== Club career ==
On 20 July 2020, he signed with Polish club Podbeskidzie Bielsko-Biała.

On 27 October 2022, Kocsis returned to his childhood club MTK Budapest.

On 7 September 2024, he signed with Hungarian club Debreceni VSC.

On 14 July 2025, he signed with Hungarian Nemzeti Bajnokság II club Videoton FC.

== Career statistics ==
Appearances and goals by club, season and competition
Club	Season	League		Cup		League Cup		Europe		Total	
Club	Season	Apps	Goals	Apps	Goals	Apps	Goals	Apps	Goals	Apps	Goals
Augsburg II
Augsburg II	2012–13	5	0	0	0	–	–	–	–	5	0
Augsburg II	2013–14	2	1	0	0	–	–	–	–	2	1
Augsburg II	Total	7	1	0	0	0	0	0	0	7	1
Videoton
Videoton	2014–15	1	0	0	0	2	0	0	0	3	0
Videoton	Total	1	0	0	0	2	0	0	0	3	0
Puskás Akadémia
Puskás Akadémia	2015–16	3	0	1	0	–	–	0	0	4	0
Puskás Akadémia	Total	3	0	1	0	0	0	0	0	4	0
Dunajská Streda
Dunajská Streda	2016–17	3	0	0	0	–	–	0	0	3	0
Dunajská Streda	Total	3	0	0	0	0	0	0	0	3	0
Diósgyőr
Diósgyőr	2017–18	25	0	5	0	–	–	–	–	30	0
Diósgyőr	Total	25	0	5	0	0	0	0	0	30	0
Karviná
Karviná	2018–19	2	0	1	0	–	–	–	–	3	0
Karviná	Total	2	0	1	0	0	0	0	0	3	0
Zalaegerszeg
Zalaegerszeg	2018–19	18	1	0	0	–	–	–	–	18	1
Zalaegerszeg	2019–20	26	0	6	0	–	–	–	–	32	0
Zalaegerszeg	Total	44	1	6	0	0	0	0	0	50	1
Career total		85	2	13	0	2	0	0	0	100	2

Updated to games played as of 27 June 2020.

== International career ==
Kocsis was named in Hungary's provisional squad for UEFA Euro 2016 but was cut from the final squad.
