= Mátyás Kovács =

Hungarian footballer (born 2003)

Personal information
- Date of birth: 7 July 2003 (age 23)
- Place of birth: Budapest, Hungary
- Height: 1.81 m (5 ft 11 in)
- Positions: Midfielder; winger

Team information
- Current team: RAAL La Louvière
- Number: 7

Youth career
- –2O14: Gödöllői SK
- 2O14–2018: Vasas SC
- 2018–2023: MTK Budapest FC

Senior career*
Years	Team	Apps	(Gls)
2020–2025	MTK Budapest FC	65	(7)
2024–2025	→ Videoton FC Fehérvár (loan)	21	(0)
2025–2026	FC Košice	31	(8)
2026–	RAAL La Louvière	7	(0)

International career^{‡}
- Hungary U15
- Hungary U16
- Hungary U17
2021	Hungary U18	1	(0)
2021–2022	Hungary U19	11	(0)
2022–2024	Hungary U21	15	(4)
- * Club domestic league appearances and goals as of 24 October 2026 ‡ National team caps and goals as of 26 March 2024

Mátyás Kovács (born 7 July 2003) is a Hungarian professional footballer who plays as a midfielder or winger for RAAL La Louvière.

== Club career ==
As a youth player, Kovács joined the youth academy of MTK Budapest FC, where he played in the UEFA Youth League and was promoted to the club's senior team in 2020. Subsequently, he was sent on loan to Videoton FC Fehérvár in 2024, where he made twenty-nine appearances in all competitions and scored zero goals and recorded one assist.

One year later, he signed for Slovak side FC Košice, where he was regarded to have established himself as a regular starter while playing for the club and helped them achieve second place in the 2025–26 Slovak Cup. Ahead of the 2026–27 season, he signed for Belgian outfit RAAL La Louvière.

== International career ==
Kovács is a Hungary youth international and has represented the country internationally at under-15, under-16, under-17, under-18, under-19 and under-21 levels. Altogether, he made one appearances and scored zero goals while playing for the Hungary national under-18 football team.

During the autumn of 2021 and the spring of 2022, he played for the Hungary national under-19 football team for 2022 UEFA European Under-19 Championship qualification. Two years later, he played for the Hungary national under-21 football team for 2025 UEFA European Under-21 Championship qualification.
