= Zsombor Nagy =

Hungarian footballer

Personal information
- Date of birth: 21 March 1998 (age 28)
- Place of birth: Szeged, Hungary
- Height: 1.86 m (6 ft 1 in)
- Position: Left-back

Team information
- Current team: Kazincbarcika
- Number: 4

Youth career
- 2005–2011: Tisza Volán
- 2011-2012: SZEOL
- 2012–2017: MTK Budapest

Senior career*
Years	Team	Apps	(Gls)
2016–2018	MTK Budapest II	42	(3)
2018–2025	MTK Budapest	106	(5)
2018–2019	→ Dorog (loan)	35	(2)
2023	→ Szeged (loan)	17	(0)
2025	Zalaegerszeg	2	(0)
2026–	Kazincbarcika	7	(1)

International career^{‡}
2015	Hungary U-17	3	(0)
2016	Hungary U-18	4	(0)
2016–2018	Hungary U-19	8	(0)
2019–2020	Hungary U-21	7	(0)
- * Club domestic league appearances and goals as of 30 May 2026 ‡ National team caps and goals as of 27 June 2020

Zsombor Nagy (born 21 March 1998) is a Hungarian professional footballer who plays for Kazincbarcika.

== Career statistics ==
As of 15 May 2021.

Appearances and goals by club, season and competition
Club	Season	League			Cup		Continental		Other		Total	
Club	Season	Division	Apps	Goals	Apps	Goals	Apps	Goals	Apps	Goals	Apps	Goals
MTK Budapest II	2016–17	Nemzeti Bajnokság III	18	2	—		—		0	0	18	2
MTK Budapest II	2017–18	Nemzeti Bajnokság III	24	1	—		—		0	0	24	1
MTK Budapest II	Total		42	3	0	0	0	0	0	0	42	3
Dorog	2018–19	Nemzeti Bajnokság II	35	2	0	0	—		0	0	35	2
Dorog	Total		35	2	0	0	0	0	0	0	35	2
MTK Budapest	2017–18	Nemzeti Bajnokság II	1	0	1	0	—		0	0	2	0
MTK Budapest	2019–20	Nemzeti Bajnokság II	19	1	8	1	—		0	0	27	2
MTK Budapest	2020–21	Nemzeti Bajnokság I	27	1	4	1	—		0	0	31	2
MTK Budapest	Total		47	2	13	2	0	0	0	0	60	3
Zalaegerszeg	2025–26	Nemzeti Bajnokság I	0	0	0	0	—		—		0	0
Career total			124	7	13	2	0	0	0	0	137	9
