= Viktor Hey (footballer, born 1996) =

Ukrainian footballer

Personal information
- Full name: Viktor Viktorovych Hey
- Date of birth: 2 February 1996 (age 30)
- Place of birth: Nyzhniy Koropets, Zakarpattia Oblast, Ukraine
- Height: 1.68 m (5 ft 6 in)
- Position: Right back

Team information
- Current team: Vasas
- Number: 23

Youth career
- 2009–2013: Munkach Mukachevo

Senior career*
Years	Team	Apps	(Gls)
2013–2016	Hoverla Uzhhorod	4	(0)
2016	Munkach Mukachevo	5	(3)
2016–2023	Kisvárda	153	(4)
2023–2025	MTK Budapest	56	(5)
2025–	Vasas	25	(0)
- * Club domestic league appearances and goals as of 31 May 2026

Viktor Viktorovych Hey (Ukrainian: Віктор Вікторович Гей; born 2 February 1996) is a Ukrainian footballer who plays as a right back for Vasas.

== Career ==
Hey is a product of the Mukacheve Youth Sportive School System. In 2013, he signed a contract with FC Hoverla, but played only in the FC Hoverla Uzhhorod reserves. In the main-team squad Hey made his debut playing as a substitute in the match against FC Dynamo Kyiv on 16 April 2016 in the Ukrainian Premier League.

== Personal life ==
He is the son of Ukrainian footballer Viktor Hey Sr.
