= 2022–23 Mezőkövesdi SE season =

Mezőkövesd
2022–23 season
- Chairman: Attila Tállai
- Manager: Attila Supka (until 6 September); Attila Kuttor (from 14 September)
- Stadium: Városi Stadion
- Nemzeti Bajnokság I: 7th
- Magyar Kupa: Quarter-finals
- Top goalscorer: League: Stefan Dražić (14); All: Stefan Dražić (16)
- Highest home attendance: 4,161 vs Ferencváros (16 October 2022); Nemzeti Bajnokság I
- Lowest home attendance: 500 vs Fehérvár (10 February 2023); Nemzeti Bajnokság I
- Average home league attendance: 1,915
- Biggest win: 3–0 vs Szekszárd (A) (17 September 2022); Magyar Kupa; 4–1 vs Nyergesújfalu (A) (19 October 2022); Magyar Kupa
- Biggest defeat: 0–5 vs Zalaegerszeg (A) (2 September 2022); Nemzeti Bajnokság I
Home colours	Away colours
- All statistics correct as of 19 March 2023.

The 2022–23 season is Mezőkövesdi Sport Egyesület's 8th competitive season, 7th consecutive season in the Nemzeti Bajnokság I and 45th year in existence as a football club. In addition to the domestic league, Mezőkövesd participated in this season's editions of the Magyar Kupa.

== Transfers ==
=== Summer ===
In: Note: Flags indicate national team as defined under FIFA eligibility rules; some limited exceptions apply. Players may hold more than one non-FIFA nationality.

No.	Pos.	Nation	Player
5	DF	HUN	Dávid Bobál (from Zalaegerszeg)
6	MF	HUN	Zoltán Derekas (loan return from Csákvár)
7	MF	HUN	Gergő Nagy (from Budapest Honvéd)
16	FW	HUN	Gábor Molnár (from Diósgyőr)
20	DF	HUN	Milán Horváth (loan from Budapest Honvéd)
66	DF	AUT	Philipp Schmiedl (from (Denmark) SønderjyskE)
72	DF	HUN	Kevin Kállai (from Szombathelyi Haladás)
80	MF	HUN	Zalán Kállai (from Szombathelyi Haladás youth)
88	FW	MKD	Remzifaik Selmani (from (North Macedonia) Renova)
—	MF	HUN	Richárd Rabatin (from III. Kerület)
—	FW	HUN	Kevin Rédling (from Vasas youth)
—	DF	HUN	Máté Kotula (loan return from Budafok)
—	FW	HUN	Gergely Bobál (loan from Vasas)

Out: Note: Flags indicate national team as defined under FIFA eligibility rules; some limited exceptions apply. Players may hold more than one non-FIFA nationality.

No.	Pos.	Nation	Player
1	GK	HUN	Botond Antal (to Tiszakécske)
6	MF	HUN	Zoltán Derekas (to Szombathelyi Haladás)
7	MF	ROU	Andreias Calcan (to (Romania) Argeș Pitești)
8	GK	HUN	Benjámin Cseke (loan to Diósgyőr)
11	MF	HUN	Benjamin Babati (loan to Győri ETO)
13	GK	HUN	Levente Bősz
15	DF	HUN	András Vági (to Soroksár)
18	DF	CZE	Denis Granečný (loan return to (Czech Republic) Baník Ostrava)
20	DF	NGR	George Ikenne
21	MF	HUN	Gergő Kocsis
22	DF	SRB	Daniel Farkaš (to Diósgyőr)
32	DF	CRO	Matija Katanec (to (Croatia) Varaždin)
39	MF	BUL	Antonio Vutov (to (Bulgaria) Lokomotiv Sofia)
44	DF	ALB	Amir Bilali (to (Kazakhstan) Akzhayik)
55	MF	HUN	Dániel Nagy (to Gödöllő)
99	FW	BIH	Marin Jurina (to (Saudi Arabia) Al-Faisaly)
—	DF	HUN	Máté Kotula (loan to Diósgyőr)
—	FW	HUN	Kevin Rédling (loan to Szeged)

=== Winter ===
In: Note: Flags indicate national team as defined under FIFA eligibility rules; some limited exceptions apply. Players may hold more than one non-FIFA nationality.

No.	Pos.	Nation	Player
—	LW	HUN	Dominik Nagy (from Budapest Honvéd)
—	MF	MTQ	Thomas Ephestion (from (Belgium) Molenbeek)
—	DF	HUN	Dominik Csontos (from Ferencváros)
—	DF	GEO	Ilia Beriashvili (from (Georgia (country)) Telavi)
—	MF	HUN	Attila Márkus (from Nyíregyháza)
—	DF	HUN	Nimród Baranyai (loan from Debrecen)
—	DF	HUN	Roland Lehoczky (loan from MTK Budapest)
—	DF	COM	Younn Zahary (from (France) Cholet)
—	LW	RUS	Nikolai Prudnikov (from (Russia) Orenburg)
—	DF	ROU	Steliano Filip (from (Romania) Dinamo București)
—	DF	HUN	Máté Kotula (loan return from Diósgyőr)

Out: Note: Flags indicate national team as defined under FIFA eligibility rules; some limited exceptions apply. Players may hold more than one non-FIFA nationality.

No.	Pos.	Nation	Player
5	DF	HUN	Dávid Bobál (loan to MTK Budapest)
12	DF	GEO	Luka Lakvekheliani
13	MF	HUN	Richárd Rabatin (to Ajka)
20	DF	HUN	Milán Horváth (loan return to Budapest Honvéd)
23	MF	HUN	Dániel Vadnai (to MTK Budapest)
50	FW	CRO	Tomislav Kiš (to (Bosnia and Herzegovina) Zrinjski Mostar)
66	DF	AUT	Philipp Schmiedl (to (Austria) Siegendorf)
88	FW	MKD	Remzifaik Selmani (to (Albania) Partizani Tirana)
92	MF	ALB	Kamer Qaka (to (North Macedonia) Shkëndija)
95	MF	HUN	Márk Madarász (to Gyirmót)
—	DF	HUN	Dominik Csontos (loan to Győr)
—	DF	HUN	Máté Kotula (loan to Dorog)

== Competitions ==
=== Overview ===
Competition	First match	Last match	Starting round	Final position	Record							
Competition	First match	Last match	Starting round	Final position	Pld	W	D	L	GF	GA	GD	Win %
Nemzeti Bajnokság I	30 July 2022	27 May 2023	Matchday 1	TBA	32	10	9	13	39	43	−4	31.25
Magyar Kupa	17 September 2022	28 February 2023	Round of 64	Quarter-finals	4	3	0	1	10	5	+5	75.00
Total					36	13	9	14	49	48	+1	36.11

Last updated: 22 May 2023
Source: Competitions

=== Nemzeti Bajnokság I ===
==== League table ====
Pos	Team	Pld	W	D	L	GF	GA	GD	Pts	Qualification or relegation
5	Paks	33	14	7	12	57	57	0	49	
6	Kisvárda	33	10	13	10	43	49	−6	43	
7	Mezőkövesd	33	11	9	13	40	43	−3	42	
8	Újpest	33	11	8	14	42	55	−13	41	
9	Zalaegerszeg	33	10	9	14	37	43	−6	39	Qualification for the Europa Conference League second qualifying round (Note: Zalaegerszeg qualified to the Europa Conference League second qualifying round as winners of the 2022–23 Magyar Kupa.)

Source: Hungarian Football Federation (in Hungarian), Soccerway
Rules for classification: 1) Points; 2) Matches won; 3) Goal difference; 4) Goals scored; 5) Head-to-head points; 6) Head-to-head goal difference; 7) Fair play ranking; 8) Drawing of lots.

==== Results summary ====
Overall								Home						Away					
Pld	W	D	L	GF	GA	GD	Pts	W	D	L	GF	GA	GD	W	D	L	GF	GA	GD
32	10	9	13	39	43	−4	39	7	4	5	24	23	+1	3	5	8	15	20	−5

Last updated: 22 May 2023.
Source: Soccerway

==== Results by round ====
Round	1	2	3	4	5	6	7	8	9	10	11	12	13	14	15	16	17	18	19	20	21	22	23	24	25	26	27	28	29	30	31	32	33
Ground	A	A	A	H	H	A	H	A	H	A	H	H	H	H	A	A	H	A	H	A	H	A	A	H	A	H	H	A	H	A	H	A	H
Result	D	L	L	W	D	L	L	L	L	D	W	W	D	W	L	L	W	D	W	W	D	D	L	D	W	L	L	L	L	D	W	W	
Position	6	10	11	7	6	9	11	11	12	11	11	10	10	9	9	9	9	9	8	6	7	7	7	8	7	7	8	8	9	9	9	8	

Updated to match(es) played on 21 May 2023. Source: Matches
A = Away; H = Home; W = Win; D = Draw; L = Loss

==== Matches ====
30 July 2022 1	Újpest	1–1	Mezőkövesd	Budapest
20:00 CEST (UTC+2)	Katona 35'	Report	Jurina 65'	Stadium: Szusza Ferenc Stadion; Attendance: 3,023; Referee: Csaba Pintér

7 August 2022 2	Kisvárda	4–2	Mezőkövesd	Kisvárda
15:30 CEST (UTC+2)	Camaj 6'; Melnyk 37'; Ilievski 49'; Makowski 56'	Report	Schmiedl (red card) 35'; Vayda 48'; Jurina 79'	Stadium: Várkerti Stadion; Attendance: 1,927; Referee: Sándor Andó-Szabó

13 August 2022 3	Kecskemét	1–0	Mezőkövesd	Kecskemét
18:00 CEST (UTC+2)	B. Katona 13'	Report		Stadium: Széktói Stadion; Attendance: 1,719; Referee: Péter Zierkelbach

22 August 2022 4	Mezőkövesd	4–2	Debrecen	Mezőkövesd
20:00 CEST (UTC+2)	Madarász 13'; Beširović 17', 66' (pen.); Dražić 34'; Cseke (red card) 81'	Report	Szécsi 6'; Bárány 47'	Stadium: Mezőkövesdi Városi Stadion; Attendance: 2,347; Referee: József Erdős

27 August 2022 5	Mezőkövesd	1–1	Vasas	Mezőkövesd
15:30 CEST (UTC+2)	Pillár 44'	Report	Holender 24'	Stadium: Mezőkövesdi Városi Stadion; Attendance: 1,894; Referee: Ádám Farkas

30 August 2022 6	Puskás Akadémia	1–0	Mezőkövesd	Felcsút
17:45 CEST (UTC+2)	Favorov 77'	Report		Stadium: Pancho Aréna; Attendance: 1,028; Referee: Marcell Derdák

2 September 2022 7	Mezőkövesd	0–5	Zalaegerszeg	Mezőkövesd
20:00 CEST (UTC+2)	D. Bobál (red card) 34'	Report	Ikoba 40', 49', 70'; Gergényi 74'; Szalay 89'	Stadium: Mezőkövesdi Városi Stadion; Attendance: 1,601; Referee: József Erdős

10 September 2022 8	Fehérvár	2–1	Mezőkövesd	Székesfehérvár
20:00 CEST (UTC+2)	Kodro 25', 81'	Report	Dražić 49'	Stadium: MOL Aréna Sóstó; Attendance: 2,376; Referee: Gergő Bogár

30 September 2022 9	Mezőkövesd	1–2	Paks	Mezőkövesd
20:00 CEST (UTC+2)	Dražić 1'	Report	Varga 56'; Bőle 64'	Stadium: Mezőkövesdi Városi Stadion; Attendance: 1,579; Referee: Péter Antal

8 October 2022 10	Budapest Honvéd	2–2	Mezőkövesd	Budapest
19:30 CEST (UTC+2)	Samperio 16'; Ennin 24'	Report	Dražić 2', 36'	Stadium: Bozsik Aréna; Attendance: 3,646; Referee: Ferenc Karakó

16 October 2022 11	Mezőkövesd	2–1	Ferencváros	Mezőkövesd
17:45 CEST (UTC+2)	Karnitsky 27'; Dibusz 83' (o.g.)	Report	Marquinhos 2'	Stadium: Városi Stadion; Attendance: 4,161; Referee: Tamás Bognár

24 October 2022 12	Mezőkövesd	1–0	Újpest	Mezőkövesd
18:00 CEST (UTC+2)	Dražić 46'	Report		Stadium: Városi Stadion; Attendance: 1,979; Referee: Péter Zierkelbach

28 October 2022 13	Mezőkövesd	1–1	Kisvárda	Mezőkövesd
20:00 CEST (UTC+2)	G. Bobál 80'	Report	Ilievski 54'	Stadium: Városi Stadion; Attendance: 1,811; Referee: Bence Csonka

5 November 2022 14	Mezőkövesd	2–1	Kecskemét	Mezőkövesd
14:45 CET (UTC+1)	Karnitsky 18'; Beširović 43'	Report	K. Kállai 29' (o.g.)	Stadium: Városi Stadion; Attendance: 2,211; Referee: Ferenc Karakó

9 November 2022 15	Debrecen	1–0	Mezőkövesd	Debrecen
18:00 CET (UTC+1)	Sós 90+2'	Report		Stadium: Nagyerdei Stadion; Attendance: 3,565; Referee: Ádám Farkas

13 November 2022 16	Vasas	1–0	Mezőkövesd	Budapest
18:00 CET (UTC+1)	Novothny 14'	Report		Stadium: Illovszky Rudolf Stadion; Attendance: 1,328; Referee: Balázs Berke

29 January 2023 17	Mezőkövesd	1–0	Puskás Akadémia	Mezőkövesd
13:00 CET (UTC+1)	Dražić 80'	Report	Băluță (red card) 93'	Stadium: Városi Stadion; Attendance: 1,219; Referee: Sándor Andó-Szabó

5 February 2023 18	Zalaegerszeg	0–0	Mezőkövesd	Zalaegerszeg
15:00 CET (UTC+1)		Report		Stadium: ZTE Arena; Attendance: 1,893; Referee: Péter Zierkelbach

10 February 2023 19	Mezőkövesd	2–1	Fehérvár	Mezőkövesd
20:00 CET (UTC+1)	Beširović 35'; Dražić 93' (pen.)	Report	Kastrati 34'; Serafimov (yellow card) 25' (yellow-red card) 92'	Stadium: Városi Stadion; Attendance: 500; Referee: Balázs Berke

18 February 2023 20	Paks	0–2	Mezőkövesd	Paks
14:30 CET (UTC+1)		Report	Babunski 53'; Molnár 63'	Stadium: Fehérvári úti Stadion; Attendance: 1,511; Referee: József Erdős

24 February 2023 21	Mezőkövesd	0–0	Budapest Honvéd	Mezőkövesd
20:00 CET (UTC+1)		Report		Stadium: Városi Stadion; Attendance: 2,105; Referee: Csaba Pintér

3 March 2023 22	Ferencváros	1–1	Mezőkövesd	Budapest
20:15 CET (UTC+1)	Traoré 11'	Report	Drazic 24'	Stadium: Groupama Arena; Attendance: 7,127; Referee: Ádám Farkas

12 March 2023 23	Újpest	1–0	Mezőkövesd	Budapest
16:00 CET (UTC+1)	Mudrinski 10'	Report	Lehoczky (red card) 74'	Stadium: Szusza Ferenc Stadion; Attendance: 2,547; Referee: Sándor Andó-Szabó

18 March 2023 24	Mezőkövesd	1–1	Kisvárda	Mezőkövesd
14:05 CET (UTC+1)	Lukić 43'	Report	Mešanović 8'; Leoni (red card) 64'	Stadium: Városi Stadion; Attendance: 1,582; Referee: Bence Csonka

2 April 2023 25	Kecskemét	0–1	Mezőkövesd	Kecskemét
14:15 CEST (UTC+2)	Nikitscher (yellow card) 20'; Szalai (yellow card) 88'	Report	Beširović 51'; Beriashvili (yellow card) 75'; Karnitsky (yellow card) 80'; Piscitelli (yellow card) 85'	Stadium: Széktói Stadion; Attendance: 2,234; Referee: Balázs Berke

7 April 2023 26	Mezőkövesd	0–1	Debrecen	Mezőkövesd
20:00 CEST (UTC+2)	Prudnikov (yellow card) 69'	Report	Lagator (yellow card) 37' (yellow-red card) 62'; Drešković 54'	Stadium: Mezőkövesdi Városi Stadion; Attendance: 2,126; Referee: Sándor Andó-Szabó

15 April 2023 27	Mezőkövesd	1–4	Vasas	Mezőkövesd
17:00 CEST (UTC+2)	Babunski 11' (pen.); Lukić (yellow card) 25'; Karnitsky (yellow card) 35'; Ephestion (yellow card) 89'	Report	Berecz (yellow card) 9'; Otigba (yellow card) 28', (goal) 88'; Novothny 39', 41'; Holender 71'; Szivacski (yellow card) 89'	Stadium: Városi Stadion; Attendance: 1,850; Referee: Gergő Bogár

23 April 2023 28	Puskás Akadémia	2–1	Mezőkövesd	Felcsút
16:30 CEST (UTC+2)	Gruber 20'; Szolnoki (yellow card) 37'; Puljić 46'; Golla (yellow card) 56'; Zahedi (yellow card) 89'	Report	Dražić (yellow card) 48'; Babunski 59'	Stadium: Pancho Aréna; Attendance: 1,381; Referee: Ferenc Karakó

29 April 2023 29	Mezőkövesd	1–2	Zalaegerszeg	Mezőkövesd
14:15 CEST (UTC+2)	Beširović 31'; D. Nagy (yellow card) 45'; Lukić (yellow card) 56'; Zahary (yellow card) 79'; Dražić (yellow card) 89'	Report	Tajti 57'; Sanković (yellow card) 59'; Mim 74'	Stadium: Városi Stadion; Attendance: 1,640; Referee: Csaba Pintér

7 May 2023 30	Fehérvár	1–1	Mezőkövesd	Székesfehérvár
19:30 CEST (UTC+2)	Heister (yellow card) 2'; Dárdai 25'; Négo (yellow card) 59'; Csongvai (yellow card) 87'; Szabó (yellow card) 90+5'	Report	Brtan (yellow card) 13'; Vayda 47', (yellow card) 82'; Beširović (yellow card) 72'	Stadium: MOL Aréna Sóstó; Attendance: 2,562; Referee: Ádám Farkas

14 May 2023 31	Mezőkövesd	6–1	Paks	Mezőkövesd
13:30 CEST (UTC+2)	Dražić 5', 38', 70'; Lukić (yellow card) 17'; Vayda 45+4'; Brtan 54'; Molnár 78'; G. Nagy (yellow card) 82'	Report	Windecker 68'	Stadium: Városi Stadion; Attendance: 1,828; Referee: Ferenc Karakó
Note: Kuttor (yellow card) 73'

21 May 2023 32	Budapest Honvéd	2–3	Mezőkövesd	Bozsik Aréna
14:10 CEST (UTC+2)	Kerezsi 45+1'; Kocsis 71'	Report	Vayda (yellow card) 27'; Dražić 35' (pen.); Beširović 54', 81'; Piscitelli (yellow card) 90'	Stadium: Budapest; Attendance: 7,300; Referee: Balázs Berke

28 May 2023 33	Mezőkövesd	1–0	Ferencváros	Mezőkövesd
17:30 CEST (UTC+2)	Filip (yellow card) 36'; Dražić 45+1' (pen.); Lehoczky (yellow card) 58'; Brtan (yellow card) 68'	Report	Szécsi (yellow card) 45+1'; Marquinhos (yellow card) 89'	Stadium: Városi Stadion; Attendance: 4,110; Referee: Ferenc Karakó

=== Magyar Kupa ===
17 September 2022 Round of 64	Szekszárd	0–3	Mezőkövesd	Szekszárd
15:00 CEST (UTC+2)		Report	Beširović 20'; Lukić 52'; Dražić 64'	Stadium: Városi Sport és Szabadidőközpont; Attendance: 150; Referee: Péter Zierkelbach

19 October 2022 Round of 32	Nyergesújfalu	1–4	Mezőkövesd	Nyergesújfalu
13:30 CEST (UTC+2)	Manga 74' (pen.)	Report	Kiš 27'; Brtan 31'; Bobál 43'; Selmani 86'	Stadium: Hajnal Tamás Sportcentrum; Attendance: 700; Referee: Tamás Berényi

1 February 2023 Round of 16	MTK Budapest	0–2	Mezőkövesd	Budapest
18:00 CET (UTC+1)		Report	Dražić 20'; Lukić 50'	Stadium: Hidegkuti Nándor Stadion; Attendance: 400; Referee: Péter Antal

28 February 2023 Quarter-finals	Mezőkövesd	1–4	Zalaegerszeg	Mezőkövesd
20:00 CET (UTC+1)	Molnár 70'	Report	Sanković 24'; Tajti 74'; Ikoba 88'; Huszti 90'	Stadium: Városi Stadion; Attendance: 700; Referee: Mihály Káprály

== Statistics ==
=== Appearances and goals ===
Last updated on 19 March 2023.

No.	Pos	Nat	Player	Total		Nemzeti Bajnokság I		Magyar Kupa	
No.	Pos	Nat	Player	Apps	Goals	Apps	Goals	Apps	Goals
3	DF	(Georgia (country)) GEO	Ilia Beriashvili	9	0	8	0	1	0
4	DF	(Croatia) CRO	Andrej Lukić	24	3	20	1	4	2
7	MF	(Hungary) HUN	Gergő Nagy	15	0	14	0	1	0
8	MF	(North Macedonia) MKD	David Babunski	19	1	16	1	3	0
9	FW	(Serbia) SRB	Stefan Dražić	27	11	23	9	4	2
10	MF	(Bosnia and Herzegovina) BIH	Dino Beširović	26	5	23	4	3	1
11	FW	(Hungary) HUN	Gergely Bobál	15	2	11	1	4	1
14	MF	(Belarus) BLR	Alyaksandr Karnitsky	26	2	22	2	4	0
15	MF	(Croatia) CRO	Marko Brtan	16	1	13	0	3	1
16	FW	(Hungary) HUN	Gábor Molnár	27	2	24	1	3	1
17	DF	(Slovakia) SVK	Róbert Pillár	18	1	15	1	3	0
18	MF	(Hungary) HUN	Attila Márkus	3	0	3	0	0	0
21	FW	(Hungary) HUN	Dominik Nagy	0	0	0	0	0	0
24	MF	(Hungary) HUN	Tamás Cseri	26	0	22	0	4	0
26	DF	(Comoros) COM	Younn Zahary	3	0	2	0	1	0
55	DF	(Hungary) HUN	Roland Lehoczky	3	0	3	0	0	0
70	DF	(Romania) ROU	Steliano Filip	8	0	6	0	2	0
72	DF	(Hungary) HUN	Kevin Kállai	26	0	23	0	3	0
77	MF	(Ukraine) UKR	Shandor Vayda	27	1	23	1	4	0
80	MF	(Hungary) HUN	Zalán Kállai	4	0	4	0	0	0
93	GK	(Italy) ITA	Riccardo Piscitelli	23	-25	22	-25	1	-0
94	MF	(Martinique) MTQ	Thomas Ephestion	6	0	4	0	2	0
96	GK	(Romania) ROU	Árpád Tordai	5	-10	2	-5	3	-5
Youth players:
25	DF	(Hungary) HUN	Nimród Baranyai	1	0	1	0	0	0
33	GK	(Ukraine) UKR	Danylo Ryabenko	0	0	0	-0	0	-0
Out to loan:
5	DF	(Hungary) HUN	Dávid Bobál	11	0	9	0	2	0
8	MF	(Hungary) HUN	Benjámin Cseke	4	0	4	0	0	0
13	MF	(Hungary) HUN	Richárd Rabatin	0	0	0	0	0	0
Players no longer at the club:
12	DF	(Georgia (country)) GEO	Luka Lakvekheliani	4	0	3	0	1	0
20	DF	(Hungary) HUN	Milán Horváth	2	0	1	0	1	0
23	MF	(Hungary) HUN	Dániel Vadnai	6	0	5	0	1	0
50	FW	(Croatia) CRO	Tomislav Kiš	6	1	5	0	1	1
66	DF	(Austria) AUT	Philipp Schmiedl	11	0	10	0	1	0
88	FW	(North Macedonia) MKD	Remzifaik Selmani	8	1	6	0	2	1
92	MF	(Albania) ALB	Kamer Qaka	5	0	4	0	1	0
95	MF	(Hungary) HUN	Márk Madarász	6	1	6	1	0	0
99	FW	(Bosnia and Herzegovina) BIH	Marin Jurina	3	2	3	2	0	0

=== Top scorers ===
Includes all competitive matches. The list is sorted by shirt number when total goals are equal.

Position	Nation	Number	Name	Nemzeti Bajnokság I	Magyar Kupa	Total
1	(Serbia)	9	Stefan Dražić	14	2	16
2	(Bosnia and Herzegovina)	10	Dino Beširović	8	1	9
3	(Croatia)	4	Andrej Lukić	1	2	3
3	(North Macedonia)	8	David Babunski	3	0	3
3	(Hungary)	16	Gábor Molnár	2	1	3
3	(Ukraine)	77	Shandor Vayda	3	0	3
7	(Hungary)	11	Gergely Bobál	1	1	2
7	(Belarus)	14	Alyaksandr Karnitsky	2	0	2
7	(Croatia)	15	Marko Brtan	1	1	2
7	(Bosnia and Herzegovina)	99	Marin Jurina	2	0	2
11	(Slovakia)	17	Róbert Pillár	1	0	1
11	(Croatia)	50	Tomislav Kiš	0	1	1
11	(North Macedonia)	88	Remzifaik Selmani	0	1	1
11	(Hungary)	95	Márk Madarász	1	0	1
/	/	/	Own Goals	1	0	1
			TOTALS	40	10	50

=== Disciplinary record ===
Includes all competitive matches. Players with 1 card or more included only.

Last updated on 19 March 2023

Position	Nation	Number	Name	Nemzeti Bajnokság I		Magyar Kupa		Total (Hu Total)	
Position	Nation	Number	Name	Yellow card	Red card	Yellow card	Red card	Yellow card	Red card
DF	(Georgia (country))	3	Ilia Beriashvili	2	0	0	0	2 (2)	0 (0)
DF	(Croatia)	4	Andrej Lukić	8	0	0	0	8 (8)	0 (0)
DF	(Hungary)	5	Dávid Bobál	0	1	0	0	0 (0)	1 (1)
MF	(Hungary)	7	Gergő Nagy	2	0	0	0	1 (1)	0 (0)
MF	(Hungary)	8	Benjámin Cseke	0	1	0	0	0 (0)	1 (1)
FW	(Serbia)	9	Stefan Dražić	0	0	1	0	1 (0)	0 (0)
MF	(Bosnia and Herzegovina)	10	Dino Beširović	4	0	0	0	4 (4)	0 (0)
MF	(Georgia (country))	12	Luka Lakvekheliani	1	0	0	0	1 (1)	0 (0)
DF	(Belarus)	14	Alyaksandr Karnitsky	6	0	0	0	6 (6)	0 (0)
FW	(Hungary)	16	Gábor Molnár	2	0	0	0	2 (2)	0 (0)
DF	(Slovakia)	17	Róbert Pillár	6	0	0	0	6 (6)	0 (0)
MF	(Hungary)	23	Dániel Vadnai	1	0	0	0	1 (1)	0 (0)
MF	(Hungary)	24	Tamás Cseri	6	0	0	0	6 (6)	0 (0)
DF	(Hungary)	55	Roland Lehoczky	0	1	0	0	0 (0)	1 (1)
DF	(Austria)	66	Philipp Schmiedl	0	1	0	0	0 (0)	1 (1)
DF	(Hungary)	72	Kevin Kállai	4	0	0	0	4 (4)	0 (0)
MF	(Ukraine)	77	Shandor Vayda	3	0	0	0	3 (3)	0 (0)
FW	(North Macedonia)	88	Remzifaik Selmani	0	0	1	0	1 (0)	0 (0)
MF	(Albania)	92	Kamer Qaka	1	0	0	0	1 (1)	0 (0)
GK	(Italy)	93	Riccardo Piscitelli	2	0	0	0	2 (2)	0 (0)
MF	(Martinique)	94	Thomas Ephestion	1	0	0	0	1 (1)	0 (0)
			TOTALS	49	4	2	0	51 (49)	4 (4)

=== Clean sheets ===
Last updated on 8 April 2023

Position	Nation	Number	Name	Nemzeti Bajnokság I	Magyar Kupa	Total
1	(Italy)	93	Riccardo Piscitelli	5	1	6
2	(Romania)	96	Árpád Tordai	0	1	1
3	(Ukraine)	33	Danylo Ryabenko	0	0	0
			TOTALS	5	2	7
