= 2023–24 Mezőkövesdi SE season =

Mezőkövesd
2023–24 season
- Chairman: András Tállai
- Manager: Attila Kuttor (until 13 February); Milan Milanović (from 14 February)
- Stadium: Városi Stadion
- Nemzeti Bajnokság I: 12th (relegated)
- Magyar Kupa: Round of 64
- Top goalscorer: League: Stefan Dražić (10); All: Stefan Dražić (10)
- Highest home attendance: 4,130 v Ferencváros (31 March 2024, Nemzeti Bajnokság I)
- Lowest home attendance: 700 v MTK (17 May 2024, Nemzeti Bajnokság I)
- Average home league attendance: 2,051
- Biggest win: 4–0 v Újpest (Home, 25 November 2023, Nemzeti Bajnokság I)
- Biggest defeat: 0–5 v Fehérvár (Away, 6 April 2024, Nemzeti Bajnokság I)
Home colours	Away colours

The 2023–24 season was Mezőkövesdi Sport Egyesület's 9th competitive season, 8th consecutive season in the Nemzeti Bajnokság I and 46th year in existence as a football club. In addition to the domestic league, Mezőkövesd participated in that season's editions of the Magyar Kupa.

During the season, the contract of Attila Kuttor was terminated by mutual agreement on 13 February 2024, after 7 games without a win in the league. It was his second managerial stint at the club since September 2022. Serbian Milan Milanović, who last managed Radnik Surdulica in the Serbian SuperLiga, has been appointed a day later as the new manager. After 8 matches, he offered his resignation to the chairman of Mezőkövesd due to not wanting to impose more financial burdens on the club because of a high probability of relegation, but András Tállai did not accept it.

On 21 April 2024, Mezőkövesd were officially relegated from the Nemzeti Bajnokság I following a 2–1 loss at Kecskemét.

== Squad ==
Squad at end of season

Note: Flags indicate national team as defined under FIFA eligibility rules; some limited exceptions apply. Players may hold more than one non-FIFA nationality.

No.	Pos.	Nation	Player
2	DF	HUN	Donát Szivacski
3	DF	GEO	Ilia Beriashvili
4	DF	CRO	Andrej Lukić
6	MF	HUN	Bálint Illés
7	MF	HUN	Gergő Nagy
8	MF	MKD	David Babunski
9	FW	SRB	Stefan Dražić
10	FW	HUN	Roland Ugrai
11	FW	HUN	József Szalai
14	MF	BLR	Alyaksandr Karnitsky
15	MF	CRO	Marko Brtan
16	MF	HUN	Gábor Molnár
17	DF	SVK	Róbert Pillár
19	MF	ESP	Jairo

No.	Pos.	Nation	Player
21	FW	HUN	Lukács Bőle
24	MF	HUN	Tamás Cseri
28	MF	SWE	Lucas Hedlund
29	DF	HUN	Zsolt Kojnok
33	MF	HUN	Szabolcs Szilágyi
72	DF	HUN	Kevin Kállai
74	GK	HUN	Ádám Kovácsik
77	MF	UKR	Shandor Vayda
78	DF	FRA	Christian Gomis
88	MF	SVK	Máté Szolgai
93	GK	ITA	Riccardo Piscitelli
94	MF	HUN	Benjámin Cseke
99	GK	HUN	István Juhász

== Transfers ==
=== Transfers in ===
Transfer window	Pos.	No.	Player	From
Summer	MF	6	(Hungary) Bálint Illés	Diósgyőr
Summer	FW	10	(Hungary) Roland Ugrai	Free agent (Note: Previous club Pendikspor.)
Summer	FW	11	(Hungary) József Szalai	Vasas
Summer	DF	29	(Hungary) Zsolt Kojnok	Free agent (Note: Previous club Fehérvár.)
Summer	MF	30	(Hungary) Martin Hudák	Soroksár
Summer	GK	74	(Hungary) Ádám Kovácsik	Free agent (Note: Previous club Fehérvár.)
Summer	DF	78	(France) Christian Gomis	Free agent (Note: Previous club Honvéd.)
Summer	MF	82	(Hungary) Attila Bodnár	Youth team
Winter	MF	19	(Spain) Jairo	Free agent (Note: Previous club Honvéd.)
Winter	FW	21	(Hungary) Lukács Bőle	Paks
Winter	MF	28	(Sweden) Lucas Hedlund	Free agent (Note: Previous club Utsiktens.)

=== Transfers out ===
Transfer window	Pos.	No.	Player	To
Summer	DF	5	(Hungary) Dávid Bobál	MTK
Summer	MF	10	(Bosnia and Herzegovina) Dino Beširović	(Sweden) AIK
Summer	DF	12	(Georgia (country)) Luka Lakvekheliani	(Georgia (country)) Dinamo Tbilisi
Summer	FW	19	(Hungary) Alexander Torvund	Tiszakécske
Winter	DF	26	(Comoros) Younn Zahary	Released (Note: Joined Žalgiris.)
Winter	DF	70	(Romania) Steliano Filip	Released
Winter	GK	96	(Romania) Árpád Tordai	Released (Note: Joined Žalgiris.)

=== Loans in ===
Transfer window	Pos.	No.	Player	From	End date
Summer	DF	55	(Hungary) Roland Lehoczky	MTK	Middle of season
Summer	DF	71	(Ukraine) Artem Nahirnyi	Puskás Akadémia	Middle of season
Winter	DF	2	(Hungary) Donát Szivacski	Vasas	End of season
Winter	FW	13	(United States) Erik Kócs-Washburn	Debrecen II	End of season
Winter	MF	33	(Hungary) Szabolcs Szilágyi	Vasas	End of season
Winter	MF	88	(Slovakia) Máté Szolgai	(Slovakia) DAC Dunajská Streda	End of season

=== Loans out ===
Transfer window	Pos.	No.	Player	To	End date

== Competitions ==
=== Overview ===
Competition	First match	Last match	Starting round	Final position	Record							
Competition	First match	Last match	Starting round	Final position	Pld	W	D	L	GF	GA	GD	Win %
Nemzeti Bajnokság I	31 July 2023	17 May 2024	Matchday 1	12th	33	5	6	22	31	63	−32	15.15
Magyar Kupa	16 September 2023	16 September 2023	Round of 64	Round of 64	1	0	0	1	0	1	−1	0.00
Total					34	5	6	23	31	64	−33	14.71

Source: Competitions

=== Nemzeti Bajnokság I ===
==== League table ====
Pos	Team	Pld	W	D	L	GF	GA	GD	Pts	Qualification or relegation
8	MTK	33	12	8	13	43	62	−19	44	
9	Zalaegerszeg	33	12	7	14	54	60	−6	43	
10	Újpest	33	11	4	18	45	67	−22	37	
11	Kisvárda (R)	33	9	4	20	40	55	−15	31	Relegation to the Nemzeti Bajnokság II
12	Mezőkövesd (R)	33	5	6	22	31	63	−32	21	Relegation to the Nemzeti Bajnokság II

Source: Hungarian Football Federation (in Hungarian), Soccerway
Rules for classification: 1) Points; 2) Matches won; 3) Goal difference; 4) Goals scored; 5) Head-to-head points; 6) Head-to-head goal difference; 7) Fair play ranking; 8) Drawing of lots.
(R) Relegated

==== Results summary ====
Overall								Home						Away					
Pld	W	D	L	GF	GA	GD	Pts	W	D	L	GF	GA	GD	W	D	L	GF	GA	GD
33	5	6	22	31	63	−32	21	3	1	12	15	32	−17	2	5	10	16	31	−15

Source: Hungarian Football Federation

==== Results by round ====
Round	1	2	3	4	5	6	7	8	9	10	11	12	13	14	15	16	17	18	19	20	21	22	23	24	25	26	27	28	29	30	31	32	33
Ground	A	H	A	H	A	H	A	A	H	A	H	H	A	H	A	H	A	H	H	A	H	A	A	H	A	H	A	H	A	A	H	A	H
Result	L	L	D	L	L	L	W	L	L	L	W	W	L	W	D	L	D	L	L	D	L	L	W	L	D	L	L	L	L	L	L	L	D
Position	11	12	11	12	12	12	11	11	11	12	11	11	11	10	10	11	10	11	11	11	12	12	12	12	12	12	12	12	12	12	12	12	12
Points	0	0	1	1	1	1	4	4	4	4	7	10	10	13	14	14	15	15	15	16	16	16	19	19	20	20	20	20	20	20	20	20	21

Source: Matches
A = Away; H = Home; W = Win; D = Draw; L = Loss

==== Matches ====
31 July 2023 1	Debrecen	3–1	Mezőkövesd	Debrecen
20:00 CEST (UTC+2)	Lončar 33', 54'; Lagator (yellow card) 64'; Do. Babunski 90+2'	Report	Lukić (yellow card) 23'; Dražić 27'; Brtan (yellow card) 29'	Stadium: Nagyerdei Stadion; Attendance: 4,844; Referee: Mihály Káprály

5 August 2023 2	Mezőkövesd	2–4	Diósgyőr	Mezőkövesd
17:45 CEST (UTC+2)	Vayda (yellow card) 42'; Dražić 48', 76'; Pillár (yellow card) 49'; Beriashvili (yellow card) 58'; Kállai (red card) 78'; Hudák (yellow card) 84'; Lukić (yellow card) 90+3'; Kojnok (yellow card) 90+7'	Report	Bárdos 4'; Požeg Vancaš 35'; Lukács 68'; Edomwonyi 88'; Vallejo (yellow card) 90+3'	Stadium: Városi Stadion; Attendance: 3,915; Referee: István Vad

12 August 2023 3	Újpest	1–1	Mezőkövesd	Budapest
18:00 CEST (UTC+2)	Simon 88'	Report	Filip (yellow card) 50'; Beriashvili (yellow card) 79'; Lehoczky 90+2'	Stadium: Szusza Ferenc Stadion; Attendance: 5,115; Referee: Balázs Berke

27 August 2023 5	Fehérvár	2–0	Mezőkövesd	Székesfehérvár
19:30 CEST (UTC+2)	Szabó 82'; Kastrati 90+4', (yellow card) 90+5'	Report	Beriashvili (yellow card) 17'; Kállai (yellow card) 63'; Brtan (yellow card) 84'	Stadium: Sóstói Stadion; Attendance: 3,217; Referee: Gergő Bogár

3 September 2023 6	Mezőkövesd	1–3	Puskás Akadémia	Mezőkövesd
14:15 CEST (UTC+2)	Dražić 13'; Filip (yellow card) 16'; Beriashvili (yellow card) 60'	Report	Batik (yellow card) 30'; Komáromi (yellow card) 53'; Corbu (yellow card) 68'; Gomis 73' (o.g.); Soisalo 76'; Gruber 86'	Stadium: Városi Stadion; Attendance: 1,800; Referee: Ferenc Karakó

22 September 2023 7	Kecskemét	0–2	Mezőkövesd	Kecskemét
20:00 CEST (UTC+2)	Szuhodovszki (yellow card) 38'; Belényesi (yellow card) 48'; Vágó (yellow card) 62'	Report	Kállai (yellow card) 31'; Dražić 64', 78'	Stadium: Széktói Stadion; Attendance: 3,647; Referee: Dr Bence Csonka

30 September 2023 8	Paks	2–1	Mezőkövesd	Paks
14:30 CEST (UTC+2)	Kinyik (yellow card) 38'; Könyves (yellow card) 58'; Böde 62'; Windecker 84'	Report	Vayda 32'; Beriashvili (yellow card) 36'	Stadium: Fehérvári úti Stadion; Attendance: 1,834; Referee: Marcell Derdák

7 October 2023 9	Mezőkövesd	1–2	Zalaegerszeg	Mezőkövesd
12:45 CEST (UTC+2)	Evangelou 67' (o.g.); Cseke (yellow card) 80'; Brtan (yellow card) 90'; Kállai (yellow card) 90+6'	Report	Mance 34', 85'	Stadium: Városi Stadion; Attendance: 1,200; Referee: Csaba Pintér

21 October 2023 10	Kisvárda	2–1	Mezőkövesd	Kisvárda
12:30 CEST (UTC+2)	Cipetić 29' (pen.); Balogh 41'; Ilievski (yellow card) 87'; Mátyus (manager) (yellow card) 90'	Report	Széles 22' (o.g.); Beriashvili (yellow card) 27'; Gomis (yellow card) 87'; Lukić (yellow card) 90'	Stadium: Várkerti Stadion; Attendance: 2,150; Referee: Ádám Pillók

29 October 2023 11	Mezőkövesd	1–0	MTK	Mezőkövesd
13:15 CET (UTC+1)	G. Molnár 7'; Babunski (yellow card) 34'; Dražić (yellow card) 85'; Piscitelli (yellow card) 87'	Report	Hey (yellow card) 40'; Kosznovszky (yellow card) 56'; Bognár (yellow card) 63'	Stadium: Városi Stadion; Attendance: 1,791; Referee: Sándor Andó-Szabó

4 November 2023 12	Mezőkövesd	2–1	Debrecen	Mezőkövesd
12:30 CET (UTC+1)	Dražić (yellow card) 2'; Cseke 5'; Cseri 10'; Gomis (yellow card) 46'; Beriashvili (yellow card) 78'; Pillár (red card) 81'; Filip (yellow card) 87'	Report	Bárány 25'; Bódi (yellow card) 41'; Vajda (yellow card) 45'; Romanchuk (yellow card) 59'; Lagator (yellow card) 67'	Stadium: Városi Stadion; Attendance: 2,119; Referee: Dr Bence Csonka

11 November 2023 13	Diósgyőr	2–0	Mezőkövesd	Miskolc
14:15 CET (UTC+1)	Gera (yellow card) 33'; Edomwonyi 40'; Vallejo 81'	Report	Kállai (yellow card) 78'	Stadium: DVTK Stadion; Attendance: 6,821; Referee: Péter Zierkelbach

25 November 2023 14	Mezőkövesd	4–0	Újpest	Mezőkövesd
19:30 CET (UTC+1)	Dražić 16', 90+3'; Kállai (yellow card) 23'; G. Molnár 39'; Vayda (yellow card) 48'; Gomis (yellow card) 70'; Cseke 90'	Report	Sasere (yellow card) 83'	Stadium: Városi Stadion; Attendance: 1,896; Referee: Marcell Derdák

3 December 2023 15	Ferencváros	0–0	Mezőkövesd	Budapest
17:45 CET (UTC+1)	Pešić (yellow card) 31'	Report	Kojnok (yellow card) 43'; Cseke (yellow card) 60'; Vayda (yellow card) 70'; Molnár (yellow card) 77'	Stadium: Groupama Arena; Attendance: 6,127; Referee: Mihály Káprály

6 December 2023 4	Mezőkövesd	0–2	Ferencváros	Mezőkövesd
19:30 CET (UTC+1)	Gomis (yellow card) 17'; Vayda (yellow card) 40'; Kállai (yellow card) 80'	Report	Zachariassen 12', (yellow card) 58'; Aaneba (yellow card) 52'; Marquinhos 71', (yellow card) 88'; Abu Fani (yellow card) 90'	Stadium: Városi Stadion; Attendance: 2,216; Referee: Balázs Berke
Note: The match was originally scheduled for 19 August 2023, but was postponed due to Ferencváros's participation in European competition.

10 December 2023 16	Mezőkövesd	0–2	Fehérvár	Mezőkövesd
15:30 CET (UTC+1)	Gomis (yellow card) 76'; Kuttor (manager) (red card) 90+3'	Report	Serafimov (yellow card) 9'; Kodro 90+5' (pen.); Christensen 90+8'	Stadium: Városi Stadion; Attendance: 1,527; Referee: István Vad

17 December 2023 17	Puskás Akadémia	0–0	Mezőkövesd	Felcsút
18:00 CET (UTC+1)	Colley (yellow card) 53'	Report	Cseke (yellow card) 23'	Stadium: Pancho Aréna; Attendance: 1,023; Referee: Marcell Derdák

4 February 2024 18	Mezőkövesd	0–3	Kecskemét	Mezőkövesd
15:00 CET (UTC+1)	Cseke (yellow card) 35'	Report	Szabó (yellow card) 9', (goal) 31'; Lukács 11', 13'; Banó-Szabó (yellow card) 55'; Vágó (yellow card) 83'	Stadium: Városi Stadion; Attendance: 1,950; Referee: Tamás Bognár

8 February 2024 19	Mezőkövesd	0–1	Paks	Mezőkövesd
16:00 CET (UTC+1)	Vayda (yellow card) 54'; Gomis (yellow card) 90+1'	Report	Osváth (yellow card) 41'; Szabó (yellow card) 43', (goal) 47'	Stadium: Városi Stadion; Attendance: 1,451; Referee: Sándor Andó-Szabó

11 February 2024 20	Zalaegerszeg	1–1	Mezőkövesd	Zalaegerszeg
19:45 CET (UTC+1)	Bedi 11'; Kiss (yellow card) 76'; Márton (manager) (yellow card) 80'	Report	Lukić (yellow card) 34'; Beriashvili 68', (yellow card) 74'	Stadium: ZTE Arena; Attendance: 1,198; Referee: Mihály Káprály

17 February 2024 21	Mezőkövesd	1–2	Kisvárda	Mezőkövesd
15:30 CET (UTC+1)	Dražić 3' (pen.); Lukić (yellow card) 35'; Szalai (yellow card) 88'	Report	Filipović 28'; Cipetić 57'; Ötvös (yellow card) 83'	Stadium: Városi Stadion; Attendance: 1,451; Referee: Balázs Berke

23 February 2024 22	MTK	3–1	Mezőkövesd	Budapest
20:00 CET (UTC+1)	Németh 45+1', 70'; Antonov 48'; Varju (yellow card) 72'	Report	Cseke 7'; Beriashvili (yellow card) 63'	Stadium: Hidegkuti Nándor Stadion; Attendance: 1,734; Referee: István Vad

2 March 2024 23	Debrecen	0–1	Mezőkövesd	Debrecen
12:30 CET (UTC+1)		Report	Lukić (yellow card) 13'; Bőle 64'	Stadium: Nagyerdei Stadion; Attendance: 3,364; Referee: Dr Bence Csonka

9 March 2024 24	Mezőkövesd	1–2	Diósgyőr	Mezőkövesd
12:45 CET (UTC+1)	Kojnok (yellow card) 31'; Dražić 45'; Szolgai (yellow card) 56'; Szilágyi (red card) 77'	Report	Szatmári 16'; Požeg Vancaš (yellow card) 41'; Gera (yellow card) 50'; Bényei 71'	Stadium: Városi Stadion; Attendance: 3,850; Referee: Péter Antal

16 March 2024 25	Újpest	2–2	Mezőkövesd	Budapest
13:00 CET (UTC+1)	Mack (yellow card) 53'; Mörschel (yellow card) 72'; Ljujić 85' (pen.); Csoboth 86'	Report	Cseke 50'; Kojnok (yellow card) 84'; Karnitsky 90+3'	Stadium: Szusza Ferenc Stadion; Attendance: 4,383; Referee: Sándor Andó-Szabó

31 March 2024 26	Mezőkövesd	0–3	Ferencváros	Mezőkövesd
18:00 CEST (UTC+2)	Molnár (yellow card) 27'; Beriashvili (yellow card) 32'	Report	Maïga (yellow card) 35'; Lončar 38', 51'; B. Varga 85'	Stadium: Városi Stadion; Attendance: 4,130; Referee: Dr Bence Csonka

6 April 2024 27	Fehérvár	5–0	Mezőkövesd	Székesfehérvár
14:15 CEST (UTC+2)	Stefanelli 31'; Christensen 61', 70' (pen.); Karamoko 76'; Berki 83'	Report	Kállai (yellow card) 66'	Stadium: Sóstói Stadion; Attendance: 3,233; Referee: Péter Antal

14 April 2024 28	Mezőkövesd	0–4	Puskás Akadémia	Mezőkövesd
18:45 CEST (UTC+2)		Report	Levi 28'; Puljić 41', 61'; Ormonde-Ottewill 45+3'	Stadium: Városi Stadion; Attendance: 1,498; Referee: Mihály Káprály

21 April 2024 29	Kecskemét	2–1	Mezőkövesd	Kecskemét
14:05 CEST (UTC+2)	Katona (yellow card) 24'; Helmich 40'; Beriashvili 65' (o.g.)	Report	Szalai 32'; Vayda (yellow card) 87'	Stadium: Széktói Stadion; Attendance: 2,083; Referee: Péter Zierkelbach

27 April 2024 30	Paks	2–1	Mezőkövesd	Paks
14:30 CEST (UTC+2)	Könyves (yellow card) 8', (goal) 60'; J. Szabó 14'; Windecker (yellow card) 54'; Kinyik (yellow card) 89'; Tóth (yellow card) 90+5'	Report	Szalai 62'; Cseke (yellow card) 63'; Bőle (yellow card) 78'	Stadium: Fehérvári úti Stadion; Attendance: 2,034; Referee: Mihály Káprály

4 May 2024 31	Mezőkövesd	1–2	Zalaegerszeg	Mezőkövesd
13:00 CEST (UTC+2)	Szalai 44'; Kállai (yellow card) 50'; Cseri (yellow card) 57'; Kojnok (yellow card) 89'	Report	Bedi 60'; Evangelou (yellow card) 86'; Dražić 87' (o.g.)	Stadium: Városi Stadion; Attendance: 1,320; Referee: Ádám Pillók

12 May 2024 32	Kisvárda	4–3	Mezőkövesd	Kisvárda
14:15 CEST (UTC+2)	Camaj 18', 45+1'; Mešanović 26'; Cipetić 35'; Lippai (yellow card) 59'	Report	Szolgai (yellow card) 47'; Kállai (yellow card) 52'; Brtan (yellow card) 80'; Ináncsi 85'; Molnár 87', 90+1'	Stadium: Várkerti Stadion; Attendance: 1,200; Referee: Péter Zierkelbach

17 May 2024 33	Mezőkövesd	1–1	MTK	Mezőkövesd
20:30 CEST (UTC+2)	Szolgai (yellow card) 56'; Kállai (yellow card) 84', (goal) 90+1'	Report	Németh 4'; Horváth (yellow card) 28'; Varju (yellow card) 36'; Hey (yellow card) 37'; Jurina (yellow card) 90'	Stadium: Városi Stadion; Attendance: 700; Referee: Marcell Derdák

=== Magyar Kupa ===
16 September 2023 Round of 64	Ajka	1–0	Mezőkövesd	Ajka
17:00 CEST (UTC+2)	Borsos 18'; Tajthy (yellow card) 29'; Rabatin (yellow card) 83'; P. Horváth (yellow card) 89'	Report	Zahary (yellow card) 33'; Kállai (yellow card) 44'; Cseke (yellow card) 74'; Kuttor (manager) (yellow card) 83'; Ugrai (yellow card) 90+5'	Stadium: Városi Stadion; Attendance: 1,200; Referee: Attila Molnár

== Statistics ==
=== Overall ===
Appearances (Apps) numbers are for appearances in competitive games only, including sub appearances.
Source: Competitions

No.	Player	Pos.	Nemzeti Bajnokság I				Magyar Kupa				Total			
No.	Player	Pos.	Apps	Goal	Booked	Sent off (straight red)	Apps	Goal	Booked	Sent off (straight red)	Apps	Goal	Booked	Sent off (straight red)
2	(Hungary) Donát Szivacski	DF	13								13			
3	(Georgia (country)) Ilia Beriashvili	DF	26	1	10		1				27	1	10	
4	(Croatia) Andrej Lukić	DF	21		6		1				22		6	
6	(Hungary) Bálint Illés	MF	6								6			
7	(Hungary) Gergő Nagy	MF	11				1				12			
8	(North Macedonia) David Babunski	MF	20		1		1				21		1	
9	(Serbia) Stefan Dražić	FW	33	10	2		1				34	10	2	
10	(Hungary) Roland Ugrai	FW	10				1		1		11		1	
11	(Hungary) József Szalai	FW	21	3	1		1				22	3	1	
13	(Hungary) Erik Kócs-Washburn	FW	7								7			
14	(Belarus) Alyaksandr Karnitsky	MF	6	1							6	1		
15	(Croatia) Marko Brtan	MF	21		4		1				22		4	
16	(Hungary) Gábor Molnár	MF	26	4	2		1				27	4	2	
17	(Slovakia) Róbert Pillár	DF	25		1	1	1				26		1	1
19	(Spain) Jairo	MF	6								6			
19	(Hungary) Nikolai Prudnikov	FW	2								2			
21	(Hungary) Lukács Bőle	FW	11	1	1						11	1	1	
24	(Hungary) Tamás Cseri	MF	29	1	1		1				30	1	1	
26	(Hungary) Younn Zahary	DF	3				1		1		4		1	
28	(Sweden) Lucas Hedlund	MF	5								5			
29	(Hungary) Zsolt Kojnok	DF	12		5						12		5	
30	(Hungary) Martin Hudák	MF	3		1						3		1	
32	(Hungary) Gergő Losontin	DF												
33	(Hungary) Szabolcs Szilágyi	MF	7			1					7			1
55	(Hungary) Roland Lehoczky	DF	4	1							4	1		
70	(Romania) Steliano Filip	DF	9		3						9		3	
71	(Ukraine) Artem Nahirnyi	DF	8				1				9			
72	(Hungary) Kevin Kállai	DF	27	1	10	1	1		1		28	1	11	1
74	(Hungary) Ádám Kovácsik	GK	10				1				11			
77	(Ukraine) Shandor Vayda	MF	30	1	6						30	1	6	
78	(France) Christian Gomis	DF	17		6						17		6	
80	(Hungary) Milán Ináncsi	MF	2	1							2	1		
80	(Hungary) Zalán Kállai	FW	2								2			
88	(Slovakia) Máté Szolgai	MF	13		3						13		3	
93	(Italy) Riccardo Piscitelli	GK	22		1						22		1	
94	(Hungary) Benjámin Cseke	MF	29	4	5		1		1		30	4	6	
99	(Hungary) István Juhász	GK	1								1			
Own goals				2								2		
Totals				29	69	3			4			31	73	3

=== Clean sheets ===
			Clean sheets		
No.	Player	Games Played	Nemzeti Bajnokság I	Magyar Kupa	Total
93	(Italy) Riccardo Piscitelli	22	6		6
74	(Hungary) Ádám Kovácsik	11	0	0	0
99	(Hungary) István Juhász	1	0		0
Totals			6	0	6
