= List of Hungarian football transfers winter 2022–23 =

This is a list of Hungarian football transfers for the 2022–23 winter transfer window. Only transfers featuring Nemzeti Bajnokság I are listed.

== Nemzeti Bajnokság I ==
Note: Flags indicate national team as has been defined under FIFA eligibility rules. Players may hold more than one non-FIFA nationality.

=== Ferencváros ===
In:

No.	Pos.	Nation	Player
11	FW	GHA	Owusu Kwabena (from (Azerbaijan) Qarabağ)
22	DF	SUR	Myenty Abena (from (Slovakia) Slovan Bratislava)
30	MF	HUN	Péter Baráth (on loan from Debrecen)
52	FW	DEN	Nikolai Baden Frederiksen (on loan from (Netherlands) Vitesse)
60	MF	ALG	Mehdi Boudjemaa (on loan from (Turkey) Hatayspor)
88	FW	CHI	Ángelo Sagal (on loan from (Turkey) Gaziantep)

Out:

No.	Pos.	Nation	Player
25	DF	DEN	Rasmus Thelander (to (Denmark) AaB)
27	MF	GEO	Giorgi Kharaishvili (on loan to (Georgia (country)) Dinamo Tbilisi)
70	FW	CIV	Franck Boli (to (United States) Portland Timbers)
93	MF	TUN	Aïssa Laïdouni (to (Germany) Union Berlin)
—	FW	CRO	Roko Baturina (on loan to (Spain) Racing Santander, previously on loan at (Slovenia) Maribor)
—	FW	NGA	Fortune Bassey (on loan to (Sweden) Degerfors, previously on loan at (Czech Republic) Viktoria Plzeň)
—	DF	HUN	Dominik Csontos (to Mezőkövesd, previously on loan at Soroksár)

=== Kisvárda ===
In:

No.	Pos.	Nation	Player
3	DF	BIH	Aleksandar Jovičić (from (Croatia) Gorica)
19	DF	BIH	Enes Alić (from (Slovenia) Domžale)
30	GK	MNE	Danijel Petković (free agent)
97	FW	SRB	Miloš Spasić (from (Serbia) Radnik Surdulica)

Out:

No.	Pos.	Nation	Player
17	FW	ALB	Jasir Asani (to (South Korea) Gwangju)
45	MF	SRB	Slobodan Simović (to (Serbia) Kolubara)
71	DF	ROU	Andrei Peteleu (from (Romania) Cluj)

=== Puskás Akadémia ===
In:

No.	Pos.	Nation	Player
8	MF	SWE	Jonathan Levi (from (Sweden) Norrköping)
20	DF	CRO	Karlo Bartolec (from (Croatia) Osijek)

Out:

No.	Pos.	Nation	Player
8	MF	SVK	Jozef Urblík (to Vasas)
13	FW	UKR	Yevgeniy Kichun (on loan to Gyirmót)
67	MF	HUN	Balázs Bakti (on loan to Budafok)
77	FW	HUN	Alen Skribek (to Paks)
95	MF	HUN	Marcell Major (on loan to Nyíregyháza)
—	MF	HUN	Bálint Kártik (to Pécs, previously on loan at Csákvár)

=== Fehérvár ===
In:

No.	Pos.	Nation	Player
3	DF	DEN	Kasper Larsen (from (Denmark) OB, previously on loan)
12	MF	HON	Deiby Flores (from (Greece) Panetolikos)
14	MF	HUN	Áron Csongvai (from Újpest)
20	MF	NOR	Tobias Christensen (from (Norway) Vålerenga)
77	MF	HUN	Mátyás Katona (from Újpest)

Out:

No.	Pos.	Nation	Player
9	FW	GEO	Budu Zivzivadze (to (Germany) Karlsruher SC)
14	FW	HUN	Ákos Szendrei (loan return to (Slovakia) Dunajská Streda)
70	FW	NGA	Funsho Bamgboye (to (Romania) Rapid București)
80	MF	UKR	Bohdan Lyednyev (loan return to (Ukraine) Dynamo Kyiv)

=== Újpest ===
In:

No.	Pos.	Nation	Player
8	MF	DOM	Heinz Mörschel (free agent)
34	DF	LUX	Tim Hall (free agent)
42	DF	GRE	Georgios Antzoulas (from (Greece) Asteras Tripolis)
91	FW	SRB	Ognjen Mudrinski (from (Thailand) Lamphun Warriors)

Out:

No.	Pos.	Nation	Player
8	MF	SRB	Matija Ljujić (on loan to (Azerbaijan) Sabail)
14	MF	HUN	Áron Csongvai (to Fehérvár)
15	DF	SRB	Miroslav Bjeloš (to (Serbia) Mladost GAT)
17	FW	CIV	Junior Tallo (to (Romania) Botoșani)
20	DF	EST	Märten Kuusk (on loan to (Estonia) Flora)
26	FW	SWE	Jack Lahne (loan return to (France) Amiens)
27	MF	HUN	Mátyás Katona (to Fehérvár)
68	DF	BIH	Dženan Bureković (on loan to (Serbia) Spartak Subotica)

=== Paks ===
In:

No.	Pos.	Nation	Player
17	FW	HUN	Alen Skribek (from Puskás Akadémia)
27	MF	HUN	Attila Haris (from Soroksár)
33	GK	HUN	József Balázs (on loan from MTK Budapest)

Out:

No.	Pos.	Nation	Player
26	MF	HUN	Patrik Volter (on loan to Siófok)
27	MF	HUN	Bálint Szabó (on loan to (Turkey) Antalyaspor)
31	GK	HUN	Gergő Rácz (on loan to MTK Budapest)

=== Debrecen ===
In:

No.	Pos.	Nation	Player
1	GK	SRB	Marko Milošević (free agent)
8	MF	HUN	Kevin Varga (from (Turkey) Hatayspor)
18	MF	NGA	Hamzat Ojediran (on loan from (Albania) Egnatia)
20	MF	MNE	Stefan Lončar (from (Serbia) Novi Pazar)
24	GK	HUN	Péter Kovács (free agent)
30	MF	TUR	Okan Aydin (from (Austria) Hartberg)
45	FW	CRO	Antonio Mance (from (Croatia) Osijek)

Out:

No.	Pos.	Nation	Player
1	GK	ROU	Raul Balbarau (on loan to (Armenia) Noah)
18	MF	HUN	Krisztofer Horváth (loan return to (Italy) Torino)
19	FW	SEN	Matar Dieye (on loan to (Finland) KuPS)
25	DF	HUN	Nimród Baranyai (on loan to Mezőkövesd)
40	FW	MAR	Karim Loukili (to (Cyprus) Karmiotissa)
42	GK	HUN	Alex Hrabina (to Nyíregyháza)
70	DF	HUN	Sámuel Major (on loan to Pécs)
77	MF	HUN	Péter Baráth (on loan to Ferencváros)
92	DF	GNB	Saná Gomes (on loan to (Bulgaria) Beroe Stara Zagora)
95	FW	NGA	Peter Olawale (on loan to (Armenia) Noah)
96	DF	BRA	Charleston (to (Kazakhstan) Maktaaral)
99	GK	HUN	Dávid Gróf (to (Greece) Levadiakos)
—	FW	HUN	Balázs Rácz (on loan to Szeged)

=== Zalaegerszeg ===
In:

No.	Pos.	Nation	Player
7	MF	ALB	Eros Grezda (free agent)
—	MF	HUN	Kevin Török (free agent)

Out:

No.	Pos.	Nation	Player
5	DF	ROU	Botond Gergely (on loan to (Slovenia) Nafta)
7	FW	HUN	Milán Májer (to Kecskemét)
9	FW	COD	Christy Manzinga (to (South Korea) Seongnam)
19	FW	BRA	Diego Carioca (loan return to (Ukraine) Kolos Kovalivka)
30	MF	HUN	Zsombor Boros (on loan to (Slovenia) Nafta)
—	MF	HUN	Kevin Török (on loan to Szentlőrinc)
—	DF	HUN	Erik Németh (to Soroksár, previously on loan at Szentlőrinc)

=== Honvéd ===
In:

No.	Pos.	Nation	Player

Out:

No.	Pos.	Nation	Player
14	MF	HUN	Dominik Nagy (to Mezőkövesd)
19	FW	MLI	Boubacar Traoré (to (Tunisia) Monastir)
94	FW	UKR	Maksym Pukhtyeyev (on loan to Mosonmagyaróvár)
—	DF	HUN	Milán Horváth (on loan to Siófok, previously on loan at Mezőkövesd)

=== Mezőkövesd ===
In:

No.	Pos.	Nation	Player
3	DF	GEO	Ilia Beriashvili (from (Georgia (country)) Telavi)
18	MF	HUN	Attila Márkus (from Nyíregyháza)
21	MF	HUN	Dominik Nagy (from Honvéd)
25	DF	HUN	Nimród Baranyai (on loan from Debrecen)
26	DF	COM	Younn Zahary (free agent)
32	FW	RUS	Nikolai Prudnikov (free agent)
55	DF	HUN	Roland Lehoczky (on loan from MTK Budapest)
70	DF	ROU	Steliano Filip (free agent)
94	MF	MTQ	Thomas Ephestion (from (Belgium) RWDM)
—	DF	HUN	Dominik Csontos (from Ferencváros, previously on loan at Soroksár)

Out:

No.	Pos.	Nation	Player
5	DF	HUN	Dávid Bobál (on loan to MTK Budapest)
12	DF	GEO	Luka Lakvekheliani (to (Georgia (country)) Dinamo Tbilisi)
13	MF	HUN	Richárd Rabatin (to Ajka)
20	DF	HUN	Milán Horváth (loan return to Honvéd)
23	MF	HUN	Dániel Vadnai (to MTK Budapest)
50	FW	CRO	Tomislav Kiš (to (Bosnia and Herzegovina) Zrinjski Mostar)
66	DF	AUT	Philipp Schmiedl (to (Austria) Siegendorf)
88	FW	MKD	Remzifaik Selmani (to (Albania) Partizani Tirana)
92	MF	ALB	Kamer Qaka (to (Albania) Shkëndija)
95	MF	HUN	Márk Madarász (to Gyirmót)
—	DF	HUN	Máté Kotula (on loan to Dorog, previously on loan at Diósgyőr)
—	DF	HUN	Dominik Csontos (to Győr)

=== Vasas ===
In:

No.	Pos.	Nation	Player
68	DF	HUN	János Hegedűs (from Diósgyőr)
88	MF	SVK	Jozef Urblík (from Puskás Akadémia)
98	FW	HUN	Norbert Balogh (on loan from (Slovakia) Dunajská Streda)

Out:

No.	Pos.	Nation	Player
7	FW	HUN	Krisztián Géresi (on loan to Szeged)
—	DF	HUN	Ádám Újvárosi (to Debreceni EAC, previously on loan)

=== Kecskemét ===
In:

No.	Pos.	Nation	Player
9	FW	HUN	Milán Májer (from Zalaegerszeg)
11	MF	HUN	Krisztofer Horváth (on loan from (Italy) Torino, previously on loan at Debrecen)
44	MF	HUN	Tamás Nikitscher (from Pécs)
74	DF	HUN	Imre Polyák (from Honvéd B)

Out:

No.	Pos.	Nation	Player
2	DF	HUN	Milán Sági (to Kozármisleny)
3	DF	HUN	Dávid Tóth (to Pénzügyőr)
6	DF	SRB	Danilo Pejović (on loan to Pécs)
9	FW	MNE	Uroš Đuranović (to (Serbia) Kolubara)
11	FW	HUN	Levente Szabó (loan return to Fehérvár)

== See also ==
- 2022–23 Nemzeti Bajnokság I
