= List of Hungarian football transfers winter 2023–24 =

This is a list of Hungarian football transfers for the 2023–24 winter transfer window. Only transfers featuring Nemzeti Bajnokság I are listed.

== Nemzeti Bajnokság I ==
Note: Flags indicate national team as has been defined under FIFA eligibility rules. Players may hold more than one non-FIFA nationality.

=== Ferencváros ===
In:

No.	Pos.	Nation	Player
11	FW	BIH	Kenan Kodro (from Fehérvár)
77	MF	ARM	Edgar Sevikyan (from (Russia) Nizhny Novgorod)
80	MF	CIV	Habib Maïga (from (France) Metz)
—	FW	HUN	Zsombor Gruber (from Puskás Akadémia)

Out:

No.	Pos.	Nation	Player
10	FW	NOR	Tokmac Nguen (to (Sweden) Djurgården)
18	MF	HUN	Dávid Sigér (to Fehérvár)
30	MF	HUN	Péter Baráth (on loan to (Poland) Raków Częstochowa)
—	FW	HUN	Zsombor Gruber (on loan to Zalaegerszeg)
—	FW	HUN	Regő Szánthó (to Vasas)
—	MF	GEO	Giorgi Kharaishvili (to (Turkey) Kocaelispor, previously on loan at (Georgia (country)) Dinamo Tbilisi)

=== Kecskemét ===
In:

No.	Pos.	Nation	Player
19	MF	HUN	Zoltán Derekas (from Haladás)
22	MF	HUN	Pál Helmich (from ESMTK)
55	FW	HUN	Dániel Lukács (from Diósgyőr)

Out:

No.	Pos.	Nation	Player
12	DF	HUN	Gábor Szalai (to (Switzerland) Lausanne)
22	FW	HUN	Barna Tóth (to Paks)
29	MF	HUN	Soma Szuhodovszki (to Debrecen)
31	MF	HUN	Bence Kiss (to Zalaegerszeg)

=== Debrecen ===
In:

No.	Pos.	Nation	Player
4	DF	ALB	Jorgo Pëllumbi (from (Croatia) Varaždin)
13	MF	HUN	Soma Szuhodovszki (from Kecskemét)
19	FW	ISL	Thorleifur Úlfarsson (from (United States) Houston Dynamo)
76	FW	HUN	Dominik Kocsis (from Budapest Honvéd)

Out:

No.	Pos.	Nation	Player
1	GK	SRB	Marko Milošević (to (Bosnia and Herzegovina) Borac Banja Luka)
2	DF	SVK	Alexander Mojžiš (loan return to (Slovakia) Ružomberok)
31	DF	HUN	Zsombor Bévárdi (to Puskás Akadémia)
33	MF	HUN	József Varga (free agent)
55	FW	SRB	Andrija Majdevac (on loan to (Serbia) Napredak Kruševac)
89	FW	GRE	Alexandros Kyziridis (on loan to (Slovenia) Mura)
—	FW	HUN	Balázs Rácz (to Pécs, previously on loan at Kozármisleny)

=== Puskás Akadémia ===
In:

No.	Pos.	Nation	Player
16	MF	FIN	Urho Nissilä (free agent)
31	DF	HUN	Zsombor Bévárdi (from Debrecen)

Out:

No.	Pos.	Nation	Player
2	DF	ALG	Mohamed Mezghrani (to (Poland) Warta Poznań)
30	FW	HUN	Zsombor Gruber (to Ferencváros)
60	FW	UKR	Oleh Yablonskyi (on loan to Csákvár)
71	MF	HUN	Patrik Posztobányi (on loan to Siófok)
73	MF	HUN	Szabolcs Dusinszki (on loan to Csákvár)
74	GK	HUN	Martin Auerbach (on loan to Mosonmagyaróvár)
—	MF	HUN	Márton Radics (on loan to Mosonmagyaróvár, previously on loan at Szeged-Csanád)

=== Paks ===
In:

No.	Pos.	Nation	Player
29	FW	HUN	Barna Tóth (from Kecskemét)

Out:

No.	Pos.	Nation	Player
5	DF	HUN	Attila Temesvári (to Nyíregyháza Spartacus)
6	DF	HUN	János Hegedűs (on loan to Siófok)
17	MF	HUN	Lukács Bőle (to Mezőkövesd)
23	FW	HUN	Péter Beke (to Nyíregyháza Spartacus)
28	FW	HUN	Dominik Földi (on loan to Szeged-Csanád)
55	DF	HUN	Zalán Debreceni (on loan to Siófok)
—	MF	HUN	Richárd Nagy (on loan to Szeged-Csanád, previously on loan at Siófok)
—	MF	HUN	Gergő Gyurkits (on loan to Siófok, previously on loan at Pécs)

=== Kisvárda ===
In:

No.	Pos.	Nation	Player
4	DF	CRO	Bernardo Matić (from (Kazakhstan) Ordabasy)
10	FW	BRA	Wellington Nem (from (Brazil) Vitória)
21	FW	CRO	Andrija Filipović (from (Kazakhstan) Aktobe)

Out:

No.	Pos.	Nation	Player
10	FW	HUN	Kristopher Vida (on loan to Nyíregyháza Spartacus)
37	FW	HUN	Ádám Czékus (on loan to Tiszakécske)
88	MF	HUN	Erik Czérna (on loan to Budafok)
99	GK	UKR	Mykhaylo Hotra (to Tarpa)

=== Mezőkövesd ===
In:

No.	Pos.	Nation	Player
19	FW	ESP	Jairo Samperio (free agent)
21	MF	HUN	Lukács Bőle (from Paks)
28	FW	SWE	Lucas Hedlund (from (Sweden) Utsikten)
33	MF	ROU	Szabolcs Szilágyi (from Vasas)
88	MF	SVK	Máté Szolgai (on loan from (Slovakia) DAC Dunajská Streda)

Out:

No.	Pos.	Nation	Player
26	DF	COM	Younn Zahary (free agent)
55	MF	HUN	Roland Lehoczky (loan return to MTK Budapest)
70	DF	ROU	Steliano Filip (free agent)
80	FW	HUN	Zalán Kállai (on loan to Tiszakécske)
96	GK	ROU	Árpád Tordai (to (Lithuania) Žalgiris)

=== Újpest ===
In:

No.	Pos.	Nation	Player
2	DF	ALB	Albi Doka (from (Albania) Tirana)
5	DF	GEO	Davit Kobouri (from (Georgia (country)) Dinamo Tbilisi)
18	DF	HUN	András Huszti (on loan from Zalaegerszeg)

Out:

No.	Pos.	Nation	Player
2	DF	KOS	Lirim Kastrati (to (Poland) Widzew Łódź)
13	GK	SRB	Đorđe Nikolić (to (Turkey) Sivasspor)
20	DF	EST	Märten Kuusk (to (Poland) GKS Katowice)
30	FW	EST	Oliver Jürgens (to (Slovakia) DAC Dunajská Streda)
33	DF	SRB	Miloš Kosanović (to (United Arab Emirates) Ajman Club)
—	MF	HUN	Bálint Szabó (on loan to Kozármisleny, previously on loan at (Romania) Csíkszereda)

=== Zalaegerszeg ===
In:

No.	Pos.	Nation	Player
23	MF	ISR	Guy Hadida (from (Ukraine) Chornomorets Odesa)
30	FW	HUN	Zsombor Gruber (on loan from Ferencváros)
49	MF	HUN	Bence Kiss (from Kecskemét)
88	FW	HUN	Balázs Vogyicska (from Ferencváros II)

Out:

No.	Pos.	Nation	Player
8	MF	HUN	István Soltész (on loan to Budafok)
17	DF	HUN	András Huszti (on loan to Újpest)
23	FW	MKD	Daniel Milovanovikj (to (North Macedonia) Brera Strumica)
30	DF	MKD	Todor Todoroski (to (Romania) Politehnica Iași)
77	FW	HUN	Szabolcs Szalay (on loan to Vasas)
80	FW	HUN	Milán Klausz (on loan to Szeged-Csanád)

=== Fehérvár ===
In:

No.	Pos.	Nation	Player
15	FW	ARG	Nicolás Stefanelli (from (United States) Inter Miami)
16	DF	HUN	Mario Simuț (from Haladás)
18	MF	HUN	Dávid Sigér (from Ferencváros)
19	FW	HUN	Patrik Kovács (from Vasas)
68	FW	SVN	Nejc Gradišar (from (Slovenia) Rogaška)
75	GK	HUN	Dániel Veszelinov (from (Slovakia) DAC Dunajská Streda)

Out:

No.	Pos.	Nation	Player
1	GK	HUN	Dániel Kovács (to (Greece) Volos)
6	MF	FRA	Franck Bambock (on loan to (Greece) Panetolikos)
10	FW	KOS	Lirim Kastrati (on loan to (Croatia) Lokomotiva)
12	MF	HON	Deiby Flores (to (Canada) Toronto)
19	FW	BIH	Kenan Kodro (to Ferencváros)
27	FW	HUN	Levente Szabó (on loan to Diósgyőr)

=== Diósgyőr ===
In:

No.	Pos.	Nation	Player
2	DF	DEN	Marco Lund (from (Sweden) Norrköping)
10	FW	HUN	Levente Szabó (on loan from Fehérvár)
32	GK	HUN	Balázs Tóth (from (Austria) Liefering, previously on loan at Kazincbarcika)
37	DF	CZE	Ondřej Bačo (from (Israel) Hapoel Jerusalem)
59	MF	ROU	Doru Popadiuc (from (Romania) Universitatea Cluj)
—	DF	HUN	Bence Komlósi (from (Italy) Parma U19)

Out:

No.	Pos.	Nation	Player
10	FW	HUN	Dániel Lukács (to Kecskemét)
30	GK	CRO	Karlo Sentić (loan return to (Croatia) Hajduk Split)
70	FW	GAB	Jérémie Obounet (on loan to (Slovakia) Košice)
99	FW	BIH	Marin Jurina (to MTK Budapest)

=== MTK Budapest ===
In:

No.	Pos.	Nation	Player
11	FW	BIH	Marin Jurina (from Diósgyőr)

Out:

No.	Pos.	Nation	Player
8	FW	HUN	Dániel Zsóri (on loan to Budafok)
11	FW	HUN	Ákos Zuigéber (on loan to Szeged-Csanád)
28	MF	HUN	Ádám Miknyóczki (on loan to Pécs)
—	MF	HUN	Roland Lehoczky (on loan to Tiszakécske, previously on loan at Mezőkövesd)

== See also ==
- 2023–24 Nemzeti Bajnokság I
