= Kevin Kállai =

Hungarian footballer (born 2002)

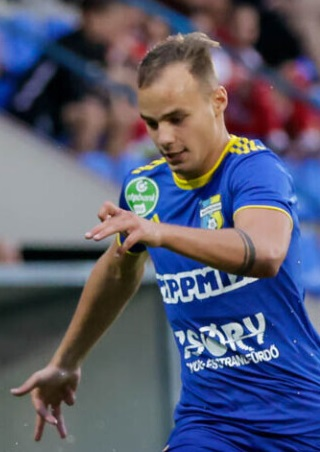
- Kállai playing for Mezőkövesd in 2023

Personal information
- Date of birth: 14 January 2002 (age 24)
- Place of birth: Miskolc, Hungary
- Height: 1.78 m (5 ft 10 in)
- Position: Right-back

Team information
- Current team: Honvéd
- Number: 72

Youth career
- 2007–2013: Diósgyőr
- 2013–2020: Haladás

Senior career*
Years	Team	Apps	(Gls)
2020–2022	Haladás	55	(0)
2022–2025	Mezőkövesd	70	(1)
2025	Diósgyőr	7	(1)
2025	Diósgyőr II	1	(0)
2025–	Honvéd	20	(0)
2025–	Honvéd II	1	(0)

International career^{‡}
2022–2023	Hungary U21	5	(0)
- * Club domestic league appearances and goals as of 31 May 2026 ‡ National team caps and goals as of 17 November 2023

Kevin Kállai (born 14 January 2002) is a Hungarian professional footballer, who plays as a right-back for Nemzeti Bajnokság II club Honvéd. He represented Hungary at youth level.

== Club career ==
=== Haladás ===
Kállai a Haladás academy product, played as a forward in academy level before switching to defender position at the senior team under János Mátyus. He debuted for Haladás in the Nemzeti Bajnokság II on 1 November 2020, a 5–0 win against Békéscsaba.

=== Mezőkövesd ===
On 23 June 2022, Kállai signed to Nemzeti Bajnokság I club Mezőkövesd alongside his brother Zalán Kállai. Kállai debuted in the first tier on 30 July 2022, a 1–1 draw against Újpest.

He made appearances for the club 57 times in the first division before heading into the final round of the already relegated side on 17 May 2024.

The team started the 2024–25 season of the second tier with only 5 players from the previous season alongside Kállai.

=== Diósgyőr ===
On 3 January 2025, Kállai returned to his boyhood club Diósgyőr in the Nemzeti Bajnokság I. He was in the squad in 12 matches, played twice as a starter and five times as a substitute. On 17 July 2025, he left the club with his brother Zalán.

=== Honvéd ===
Not long after his departure announcement, Kállai signed a three-year contract with Nemzeti Bajnokság II club Honvéd.

== Personal life ==
Kállai is the older brother of Zalán Kállai who is also a footballer playing at the left side.

== Career statistics ==
=== Club ===
As of match played 11 February 2026

Appearances and goals by club, season and competition
Club	Season	League			National cup (Note: Includes Magyar Kupa)		Total	
Club	Season	Division	Apps	Goals	Apps	Goals	Apps	Goals
Haladás	2020–21	Nemzeti Bajnokság II	23	0	2	0	25	0
Haladás	2021–22	Nemzeti Bajnokság II	32	0	—		32	0
Haladás	Total		55	0	2	0	57	0
Mezőkövesd	2022–23	Nemzeti Bajnokság I	31	0	3	0	34	0
Mezőkövesd	2023–24	Nemzeti Bajnokság I	27	1	1	0	28	1
Mezőkövesd	2024–25	Nemzeti Bajnokság II	12	0	2	0	14	0
Mezőkövesd	Total		70	1	6	0	76	1
Diósgyőr	2024–25	Nemzeti Bajnokság I	7	1	—		7	1
Diósgyőr II	2024–25	Nemzeti Bajnokság III	1	0	—		1	0
Honvéd	2025–26	Nemzeti Bajnokság II	13	0	3	0	16	0
Honvéd II	2025–26	Nemzeti Bajnokság III	1	0	—		1	0
Career total			147	2	11	0	158	2
