= David Babunski =

Macedonian footballer

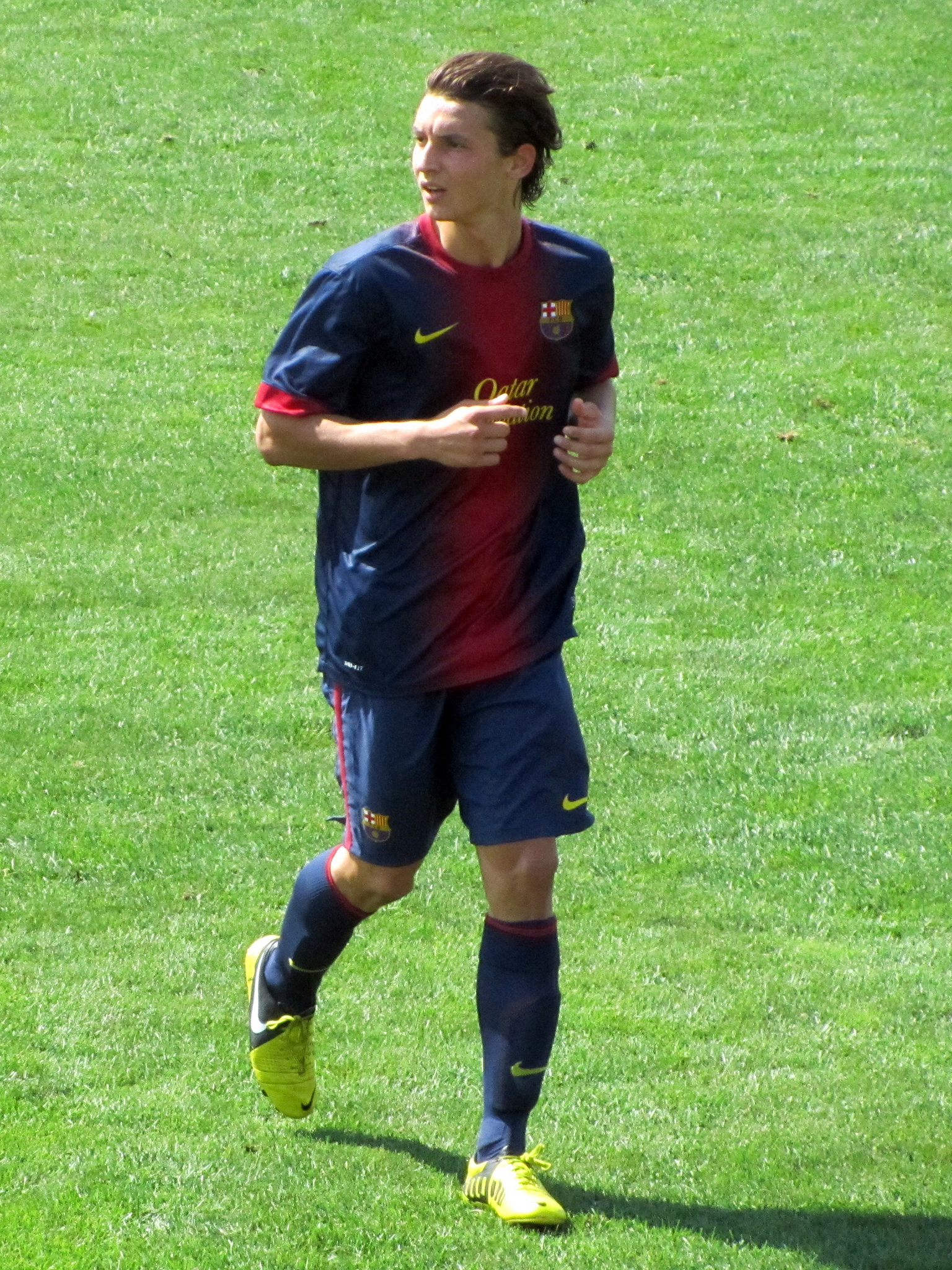
- Babunski playing for Barcelona youth in 2012

Personal information
- Date of birth: 1 March 1994 (age 32)
- Place of birth: Skopje, Macedonia (present-day North Macedonia)
- Height: 1.78 m (5 ft 10 in)
- Position: Attacking midfielder

Team information
- Current team: Vardar
- Number: 6

Youth career
- –2006: Gramenet
- 2006–2013: Barcelona

Senior career*
| Years | Team | Apps | (Gls) |
| 2013–2016 | Barcelona B | 48 | (1) |
| 2016–2017 | Red Star Belgrade | 11 | (0) |
| 2017–2018 | Yokohama F. Marinos | 25 | (3) |
| 2018–2020 | Omiya Ardija | 34 | (4) |
| 2020–2021 | Botoșani | 14 | (0) |
| 2021 | Viitorul Constanța | 13 | (0) |
| 2021–2022 | Debrecen | 24 | (1) |
| 2022–2024 | Mezőkövesd | 44 | (3) |
| 2024–2025 | Dundee United | 24 | (1) |
| 2025– | Vardar | 23 | (3) |

International career^{‡}
| 2010–2011 | Macedonia U-17 | 4 | (0) |
| 2011 | Macedonia U-19 | 3 | (1) |
| 2012–2017 | Macedonia U-21 | 27 | (5) |
| 2013–2025 | Macedonia | 18 | (0) |
- * Club domestic league appearances and goals as of 23 May 2026 ‡ National team caps and goals as of 12 June 2025

David Babunski (Macedonian: Давид Бабунски; born 1 March 1994) is a Macedonian professional footballer who plays as an attacking midfielder for Macedonian First League club Vardar.

A product of FC Barcelona's La Masia, he played for their reserves before transferring to Red Star Belgrade in January 2016, winning the Serbian SuperLiga in his first season. He later played in Japan, Romania and Hungary.

Babunski has been capped by the Macedonia football team at international level, making his senior debut in 2013.

== Club career ==
=== Barcelona ===
Born in Skopje, Babunski joined FC Barcelona's La Masia in 2006, aged 12, after starring at UDA Gramenet. In December 2011, he was elected Macedonian Young Sportsperson of the Year, ahead of karatekas Aziz Ismail and Berat Jakupi.

Babunski was promoted to the reserves in June 2013, and made his professional debut on 24 August, coming on as a second-half substitute in a 2–1 home win against CD Lugo in the Segunda División championship. He scored his first goal on 31 May 2014, netting a last-minute winner in a 4–3 home success over AD Alcorcón.

He played 16 games in 2014–15, a campaign which ended with relegation to Segunda División B. On 28 February 2015, as a half-time substitute for Juan Cámara, he received a straight red card in a 2–4 loss to RCD Mallorca at the Mini Estadi.

After a decade in the ranks of Barcelona, Babunski left by mutual consent in January 2016.

=== Red Star Belgrade ===
Babunski signed a 2 1/2-year deal with Red Star Belgrade on 28 January 2016. He made his Serbian SuperLiga debut on 20 February, replacing Aleksandar Katai for the final 11 minutes of a 2–1 home win over FK Mladost Lučani, and played five more matches as the team won their 27th title.

=== Japan ===
On 30 January 2017, Babunski signed for Japanese club Yokohama F. Marinos, as their second purchase from Red Star that month after that of Hugo Vieira. He made his debut in the J1 League on 25 February, scoring the first goal of a 3–2 home win over Urawa Red Diamonds in the season opener.

In August 2018, Babunski signed for Omiya Ardija, in the same league.

=== Romania ===
On 2 March 2020, Babunski signed a one-and-a-half-year contract with Romanian club FC Botoșani. On 29 December, he was released from the club by mutual consent.

On 11 January 2021, Babunski joined FC Viitorul Constanța also of Liga I on a two-and-a-half-year contract.

=== Hungary ===
On 8 July 2021, Babunski signed a two-year deal with Hungarian club Debreceni VSC.

In the summer of 2022, Debreceni VSC terminated his contract by mutual consent. On 20 September 2022, Babunski signed with Mezőkövesd, and in January 2023 signed a new two-and-a-half-year contract with the club.

=== Dundee United ===
On 16 July 2024, Babunski signed for Scottish Premiership side Dundee United on a one-year deal with the option for a further season.

== International career ==
A regular in all of Macedonia's youth squads, Babunski scored his first goal for the under-21 team on 25 May 2012, netting his side's second in a 2–2 friendly draw against Albania.

In August 2013 he was called up by the main squad for a friendly against Bulgaria. Babunski made his debut for the side on the 14th, playing the last 31 minutes of the 2–0 home win in Skopje.

== Personal life ==
Babunski's father, Boban, was also a footballer, and played in several countries including Spain. His younger brother, Dorian, is also a footballer who plays as a forward, and the pair played together at Debrecen. Babunski's great-great-grandfather was Jovan Babunski, a vojvoda, while he has stated that he is proud of being Jovan Babunski's descendant.

Babunski is a vocal supporter of the human rights of refugees. He, his brother, and four friends spent Christmas 2015 at a refugee camp in Gevgelija, a Macedonian town on the Greek border and part of the Balkan route for displaced people seeking accommodation in the West.

== Career statistics ==
=== Club ===
As of match played 16 March 2025

Appearances and goals by club, season and competition
| Club | Season | League | | | National cup (Note: Includes Serbian Cup, Emperor's Cup, Cupa României, Magyar Kupa) | | League cup (Note: Includes J.League Cup, Scottish League Cup) | | Continental | | Total | |
| Club | Season | Division | Apps | Goals | Apps | Goals | Apps | Goals | Apps | Goals | Apps | Goals |
|---|---|---|---|---|---|---|---|---|---|---|---|---|
| Barcelona B | 2013–14 | Segunda División | 19 | 1 | — | | — | | — | | 19 | 1 |
| Barcelona B | 2014–15 | Segunda División | 16 | 0 | — | | — | | — | | 16 | 0 |
| Barcelona B | 2015–16 | Segunda División B | 13 | 0 | — | | — | | — | | 13 | 0 |
| Barcelona B | Total | | 48 | 1 | — | | — | | — | | 48 | 1 |
| Red Star Belgrade | 2015–16 | Serbian SuperLiga | 6 | 0 | 0 | 0 | — | | 0 | 0 | 6 | 0 |
| Red Star Belgrade | 2016–17 | Serbian SuperLiga | 5 | 0 | 1 | 0 | — | | 1 (Note: Appearance in UEFA Europa League) | 0 | 7 | 0 |
| Red Star Belgrade | Total | | 11 | 0 | 1 | 0 | — | | 1 | 0 | 13 | 0 |
| Yokohama F. Marinos | 2017 | J1 League | 20 | 3 | 4 | 0 | 3 | 0 | — | | 27 | 3 |
| Yokohama F. Marinos | 2018 | J1 League | 5 | 0 | 1 | 0 | 5 | 0 | — | | 11 | 0 |
| Yokohama F. Marinos | Total | | 25 | 3 | 5 | 0 | 8 | 0 | — | | 38 | 3 |
| Omiya Ardija | 2018 | J2 League | 6 | 0 | — | | — | | — | | 6 | 0 |
| Omiya Ardija | 2019 | J2 League | 28 | 4 | 2 | 0 | — | | — | | 30 | 4 |
| Omiya Ardija | Total | | 34 | 4 | 2 | 0 | — | | — | | 36 | 4 |
| Botoșani | 2019–20 | Liga I | 7 | 0 | — | | — | | — | | 7 | 0 |
| Botoșani | 2020–21 | Liga I | 7 | 0 | 1 | 0 | — | | 1 | 0 | 9 | 0 |
| Botoșani | Total | | 14 | 0 | 1 | 0 | — | | 1 | 0 | 16 | 0 |
| Viitorul Constanța | 2020–21 | Liga I | 13 | 0 | — | | — | | — | | 13 | 0 |
| Debrecen | 2021–22 | NB I | 24 | 1 | 2 | 0 | — | | — | | 26 | 1 |
| Mezőkövesdi | 2022–23 | NB I | 24 | 3 | 2 | 0 | — | | — | | 26 | 3 |
| Mezőkövesdi | 2023–24 | NB I | 20 | 0 | 0 | 0 | — | | — | | 20 | 0 |
| Mezőkövesdi | Total | | 44 | 3 | 2 | 0 | — | | — | | 46 | 3 |
| Dundee United | 2024–25 | Scottish Premiership | 18 | 1 | 0 | 0 | 5 | 2 | — | | 23 | 3 |
| Career total | | | 231 | 13 | 13 | 0 | 13 | 2 | 2 | 0 | 259 | 15 |

=== International ===
As of match played 20 November 2022

Appearances and goals by national team and year
| National team | Year | Apps | Goals |
|---|---|---|---|
| Macedonia | 2013 | 3 | 0 |
| Macedonia | 2014 | 3 | 0 |
| Macedonia | 2015 | 0 | 0 |
| Macedonia | 2016 | 2 | 0 |
| Macedonia | 2017 | 1 | 0 |
| Macedonia | 2018 | 0 | 0 |
| Macedonia | 2019 | 0 | 0 |
| Macedonia | 2020 | 0 | 0 |
| Macedonia | 2021 | 0 | 0 |
| Macedonia | 2022 | 4 | 0 |
| Total | | 13 | 0 |

== Honours ==
Red Star Belgrade

- Serbian SuperLiga: 2015–16
