= Zsolt Kojnok =

Hungarian footballer

Personal information
- Date of birth: 15 February 2001 (age 25)
- Place of birth: Mór, Hungary
- Height: 1.82 m (6 ft 0 in)
- Position: Right back

Team information
- Current team: Videoton Fehérvár
- Number: 29

Youth career
- 2006–2012: Mór
- 2012–2020: Fehérvár

Senior career*
Years	Team	Apps	(Gls)
2018–2023	Fehérvár II	70	(7)
2021–2023	Fehérvár	3	(0)
2022	→ Budaörs (loan)	11	(1)
2023–2025	Mezőkövesd	26	(0)
2025–	Videoton Fehérvár	12	(0)

International career^{‡}
2017	Hungary U-17	1	(0)
- * Club domestic league appearances and goals as of 31 May 2026 ‡ National team caps and goals as of 15 November 2017

Zsolt Kojnok (born 15 February 2001) is a Hungarian professional footballer who plays for Videoton Fehérvár.

== Career statistics ==
As of 15 May 2022.

Appearances and goals by club, season and competition
Club	Season	League			Cup		Continental		Other		Total	
Club	Season	Division	Apps	Goals	Apps	Goals	Apps	Goals	Apps	Goals	Apps	Goals
Fehérvár II	2017-18	Nemzeti Bajnokság III	2	0	—		—		—		2	0
Fehérvár II	2018-19	Nemzeti Bajnokság III	16	2	—		—		—		16	2
Fehérvár II	2019-20	Nemzeti Bajnokság III	18	1	—		—		—		18	1
Fehérvár II	2020-21	Nemzeti Bajnokság III	27	2	—		—		—		27	2
Fehérvár II	2021-22	Nemzeti Bajnokság III	7	2	—		—		—		7	2
Fehérvár II	Total		70	7	0	0	0	0	0	0	70	7
Fehérvár	2021-22	Nemzeti Bajnokság I	3	0	2	0	0	0	0	0	5	0
Fehérvár	Total		3	0	2	0	0	0	0	0	5	0
Budaörs	2021-22	Nemzeti Bajnokság II	11	1	0	0	–	–	–	–	11	1
Budaörs	Total		11	1	0	0	0	0	0	0	11	1
Career total			84	8	2	0	0	0	0	0	86	8
