= Zalán Kállai =

Hungarian footballer (born 2004)

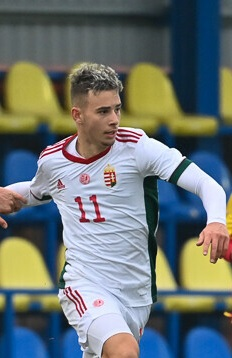
- Kállai playing for Hungary U18 in 2021

Personal information
- Date of birth: 21 February 2004 (age 22)
- Place of birth: Miskolc, Hungary
- Height: 1.83 m (6 ft 0 in)
- Position: Forward

Team information
- Current team: Szentlőrinc

Youth career
- 2009–2013: Diósgyőr
- 2013–2014: Lurkó
- 2014–2022: Illés Akadémia

Senior career*
| Years | Team | Apps | (Gls) |
| 2021 | Haladás | 3 | (0) |
| 2022–2025 | Mezőkövesd | 8 | (0) |
| 2022–2023 | → Kazincbarcika (loan) | 13 | (2) |
| 2022 | Mezőkövesd II | 1 | (0) |
| 2024 | → Tiszakécske (loan) | 10 | (0) |
| 2025 | Diósgyőr II | 11 | (6) |
| 2025 | Diósgyőr | 1 | (0) |
| 2025– | Szentlőrinc | 0 | (0) |
| 2025 | → Nagykanizsa (loan) | 1 | (0) |

International career
| 2021–2022 | Hungary U18 | 5 | (0) |
| 2022–2023 | Hungary U19 | 8 | (0) |
- * Club domestic league appearances and goals as of 31 August 2025

Zalán Kállai (born 21 February 2004) is a Hungarian professional footballer who plays as a forward for Nemzeti Bajnokság II club Szentlőrinc.

== Club career ==
On 25 June 2022, Kállai signed with his brother, Kevin Kállai, joining Nemzeti Bajnokság I club Mezőkövesd.

On 11 August 2025, he signed for Nemzeti Bajnokság II club Szentlőrinc, before being loaned out to Nemzeti Bajnokság III side Nagykanizsa.

== Personal life ==
Kállai is the younger brother of Kevin Kállai. He played alongside him at Haladás, Mezőkövesd and Diósgyőr until 2025.

== Career statistics ==
As of match played 31 August 2025

Appearances and goals by club, season and competition
| Club | Season | League | | | Magyar Kupa | | Total | |
| Club | Season | Division | Apps | Goals | Apps | Goals | Apps | Goals |
|---|---|---|---|---|---|---|---|---|
| Haladás | 2021–22 | Nemzeti Bajnokság II | 3 | 0 | 1 | 0 | 4 | 0 |
| Mezőkövesd | 2022–23 | Nemzeti Bajnokság I | 4 | 0 | — | | 4 | 0 |
| Mezőkövesd | 2023–24 | Nemzeti Bajnokság I | 2 | 0 | — | | 2 | 0 |
| Mezőkövesd | 2024–25 | Nemzeti Bajnokság II | 2 | 0 | 1 | 0 | 3 | 0 |
| Mezőkövesd | Total | | 8 | 0 | 1 | 0 | 9 | 0 |
| Kazincbarcika | 2022–23 | Nemzeti Bajnokság II | 13 | 2 | — | | 13 | 2 |
| Mezőkövesd II | 2022–23 | Megyei Bajnokság I | 1 | 0 | — | | 1 | 0 |
| Tiszakécske (loan) | 2023–24 | Nemzeti Bajnokság II | 10 | 0 | 0 | 0 | 10 | 0 |
| Diósgyőr II | 2024–25 | Nemzeti Bajnokság III | 11 | 6 | — | | 11 | 6 |
| Diósgyőr | 2024–25 | Nemzeti Bajnokság I | 1 | 0 | — | | 1 | 0 |
| Nagykanizsa (loan) | 2025–26 | Nemzeti Bajnokság III | 1 | 0 | 1 | 0 | 2 | 0 |
| Career total | | | 48 | 8 | 3 | 0 | 51 | 8 |

=== International ===
As of match played 15 November 2025

Appearances and goals by national team and year
| Team | Year | Total | |
| Team | Year | Apps | Goals |
|---|---|---|---|
| Hungary U18 | 2021 | 1 | 0 |
| Hungary U18 | 2022 | 4 | 0 |
| Hungary U18 | Total | 5 | 0 |
| Hungary U19 | 2022 | 6 | 0 |
| Hungary U19 | 2023 | 2 | 0 |
| Hungary U19 | Total | 8 | 0 |
| Career total | | 13 | 0 |
