= Philipp Schmiedl =

Austrian footballer

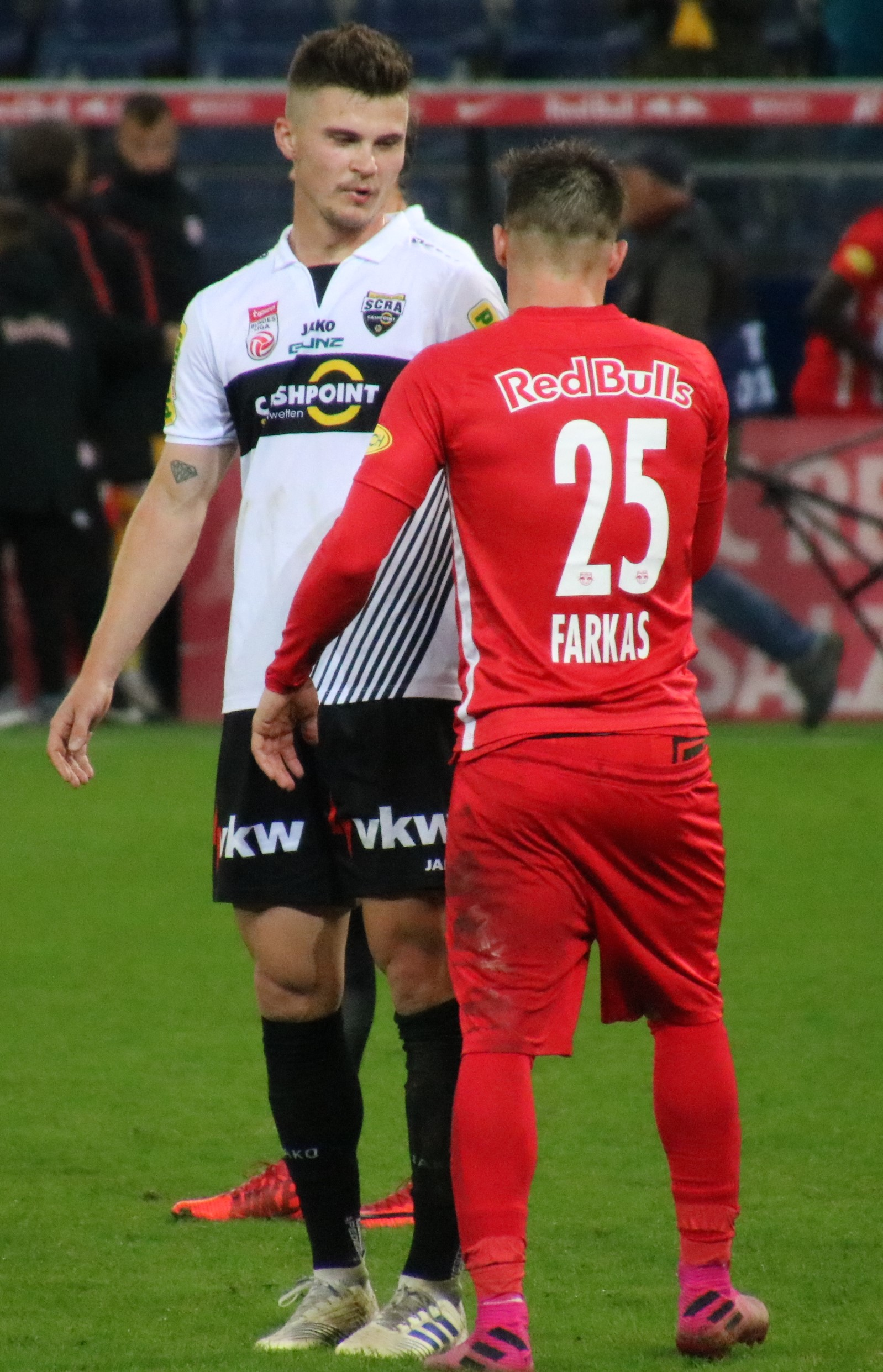
- 2019

Personal information
- Date of birth: 23 July 1997 (age 29)
- Place of birth: Antau, Austria
- Height: 1.87 m (6 ft 2 in)
- Position: Centre-back

Team information
- Current team: ASV Siegendorf
- Number: 22

Youth career
- 2004–2008: SC Wiesen
- 2008–2009: ASV Neufeld
- 2009–2011: Rapid Wien
- 2011–2013: Fußballakademie Burgenland
- 2013–2015: Rapid Wien

Senior career*
Years	Team	Apps	(Gls)
2015–2016	Union St. Florian	28	(8)
2016–2019	Juniors OÖ	73	(8)
2019–2020	SCR Altach	23	(1)
2020–2022	SønderjyskE	21	(0)
2021–2022	→ Admira Wacker (loan)	21	(0)
2022–2023	Mezőkövesdi	10	(0)
2023–	ASV Siegendorf	3	(0)

International career
2012	Austria U16	2	(0)
- * Club domestic league appearances and goals as of 11 March 2023

Philipp Schmiedl (born 23 July 1997) is an Austrian professional footballer who plays as a centre-back for ASV Siegendorf.

== Club career ==
He made his professional Austrian Football Second League debut for Juniors OÖ on 29 July 2018 in a game against Wacker Innsbruck II.

On 23 July 2019 he signed a two-year contract with an additional one-year extension option with SCR Altach. He made his Austrian Football Bundesliga debut with SCR Altach on 15 September 2019 in a game against St. Pölten.

On 3 October 2020, Schmiedl signed a four-year contract with Danish Superliga club SønderjyskE. To get more playing time, Schmiedl returned to Austria on 31 August 2021, signing a season-long loan deal with Admira Wacker. On 27 July 2022, after returning from his latest loan spell, Schmiedl left SønderjyskE to join Hungarian side Mezőkövesdi SE.

On 27 June 2022, Schmiedl joined Hungarian club Mezőkövesd. In January 2023, he moved to the Austrian third-tier Austrian Regionalliga club ASV Siegendorf.
