= Thomas Ephestion =

Martiniquais footballer (born 1995)

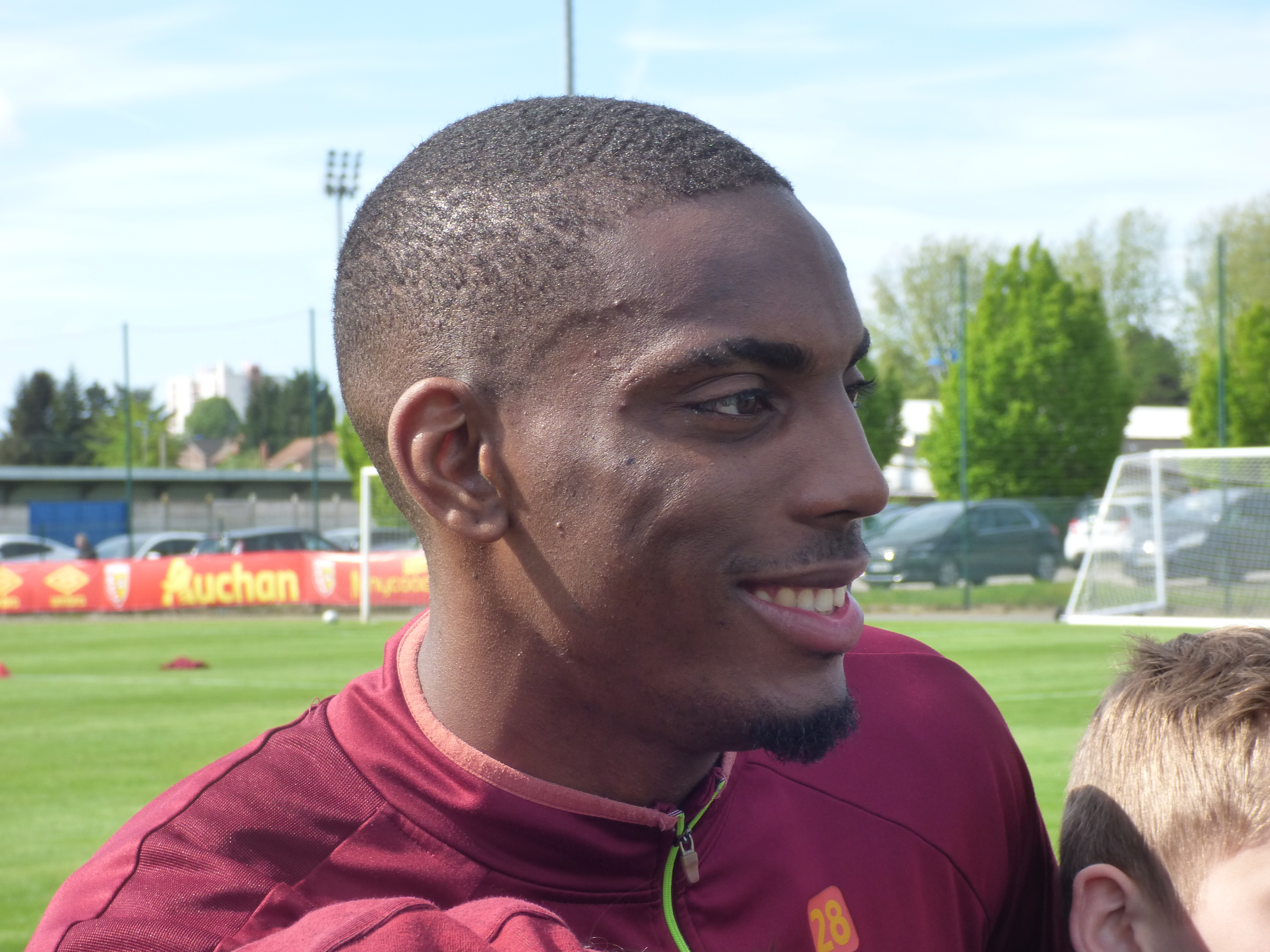
- Ephestion with Lens in 2018

Personal information
- Date of birth: 9 June 1995 (age 31)
- Place of birth: Sucy-en-Brie, France
- Height: 1.89 m (6 ft 2 in)
- Position: Midfielder

Team information
- Current team: Olympic Charleroi
- Number: 94

Youth career
- Valenciennes
- 2013–2015: Marseille

Senior career*
Years	Team	Apps	(Gls)
2012–2013	Valenciennes B	4	(0)
2014–2015	Marseille B	14	(1)
2015–2017	Béziers	18	(1)
2017–2018	Lens B	8	(0)
2017–2018	Lens	21	(2)
2018–2020	Orléans	34	(2)
2020–2022	Westerlo	4	(0)
2021–2022	→ RWDM (loan)	32	(2)
2022–2023	RWDM	7	(0)
2023	Mezőkövesd	7	(0)
2024	Créteil-Lusitanos	6	(0)
2025–2026	Saint-Priest	8	(1)
2026–	Olympic Charleroi	7	(1)

International career^{‡}
2019–	Martinique	2	(0)
- * Club domestic league appearances and goals as of 20 April 2026 ‡ National team caps and goals as of 8 May 2023

Thomas Ephestion (born 9 June 1995) is a professional footballer who plays as a midfielder for Belgian club Olympic Charleroi. Born in metropolitan France, he plays for the Martinique national team.

== Club career ==
On 27 January 2021, Ephestion joined RWDM on loan.

On 5 July 2022, Ephestion moved to RWDM on a permanent basis.

== International career ==
Ephestion's origin is from France's overseas region of Martinique. He was called up to the Martinique national football team for 2019–20 CONCACAF Nations League qualifying matches in March 2019. He made his debut for the squad on 23 March 2019 in a game against Guadeloupe, as a starter.
