= Remzifaik Selmani =

Macedonian footballer

Personal information
- Full name: Remzifaik Selmani; Ремзифаик Селмани
- Date of birth: 5 May 1997 (age 29)
- Place of birth: Tetovo, Macedonia
- Height: 1.80 m (5 ft 11 in)
- Position: Forward

Team information
- Current team: Arsimi

Senior career*
Years	Team	Apps	(Gls)
2014–2017	Renova	60	(10)
2017–2018	Újpest	1	(0)
2018–2019	Shkëndija	6	(0)
2019	→ Llapi (loan)	13	(1)
2019–2022	Renova	76	(30)
2022–2023	Mezőkövesd	6	(0)
2023	Partizani Tirana	5	(1)
2023	Gostivari	9	(2)
2024	Bregalnica Štip	13	(2)
2024–2025	Besa Dobërdoll	23	(5)
2025–2026	Ferizaj	18	(2)
2026–	Arsimi	0	(0)

International career
	Macedonia U19	3	(3)
2017	Macedonia U21	5	(0)
- * Club domestic league appearances and goals as of 30 June 2025

Remzifaik Selmani (Macedonian: Ремзифаик Селмани; born 5 May 1997) is a Macedonian professional footballer who plays for Ferizaj in the Football Superleague of Kosovo.

== Club career ==
Born in Tetovo, Remzifaik Selmani was playing in Macedonia for the youth team of Renova until the summer in 2014 when he got promoted to the senior team of the club, competing in the Macedonian First League. He performed at Renova for three consecutive seasons and collected 60 caps and 10 goals in the First League, until the summer 2017 when he moved to Hungary, signing for Újpest. Two months later, on 9 September 2017, he also made his debut for his new club by entering the game in the 72nd minute in the league game against Puskás Akadémia.

On 22 January 2019, Selmani was loaned out from KF Shkëndija to KF Llapi in Kosovo for the rest of the season.

== International career ==
He has been a regular member of Macedonian U-19 and U-21 national teams, where he also served as captain in few occasions.

== Honours ==
Partizani Tirana

- Kategoria Superiore: 2022–23

Shkëndija

- Macedonian First Football League: 2018–19

Újpest

- Hungarian Cup: 2017–18
