= Lucas Hedlund =

Swedish footballer

Personal information
- Date of birth: 18 August 1998 (age 28)
- Place of birth: Sweden
- Height: 1.81 m (5 ft 11 in)
- Position: Forward

Team information
- Current team: GAIS
- Number: 28

Youth career
- Melleruds IF
- Kroppefjälls IF
- IFK Åmål

Senior career*
Years	Team	Apps	(Gls)
2014-2018	Häcken	1	(0)
2019–2023	Utsikten	104	(35)
2024	Mezőkövesd	5	(0)
2024–	GAIS	33	(0)
- * Club domestic league appearances and goals as of 27 May 2026

Lucas Hedlund (born 18 August 1998) is a Swedish footballer who plays for Allsvenskan club GAIS.

== Career ==
=== BK Häcken ===
Hedlund scored his first senior goal in the Swedish Cup in a 9–1 victory for BK Häcken on 23 August 2017 against Kvibille BK. Hedlund made his debut in the Allsvenskan for BK Häcken on 11 November 2018 against IFK Norrköping. However, at the end of the 2018 season, he was released by the club.

=== Utsiktens ===
Hedlund signed a contract with Utsiktens BK ahead of the 2019 season. In 2020 Hedlund suffered a serious injury that restricted his play when a knee in the back caused a fractured vertebra and a herniated disc. Hedlund extended his contract with Utsiktens BK in January 2022. In April 2022 Headland scored the first goal for Utsiktens back in the Superettan following their promotion back for the 2022 season.

=== Mezőkövesd ===
On 19 January 2024, Hedlund signed with Mezőkövesd in Hungary.

=== GAIS ===
In June 2024, Hedlund returned to Sweden, joining newly promoted Allsvenskan club GAIS on a three-and-a-half-year deal.
