= Dino Beširović =

Bosnian footballer

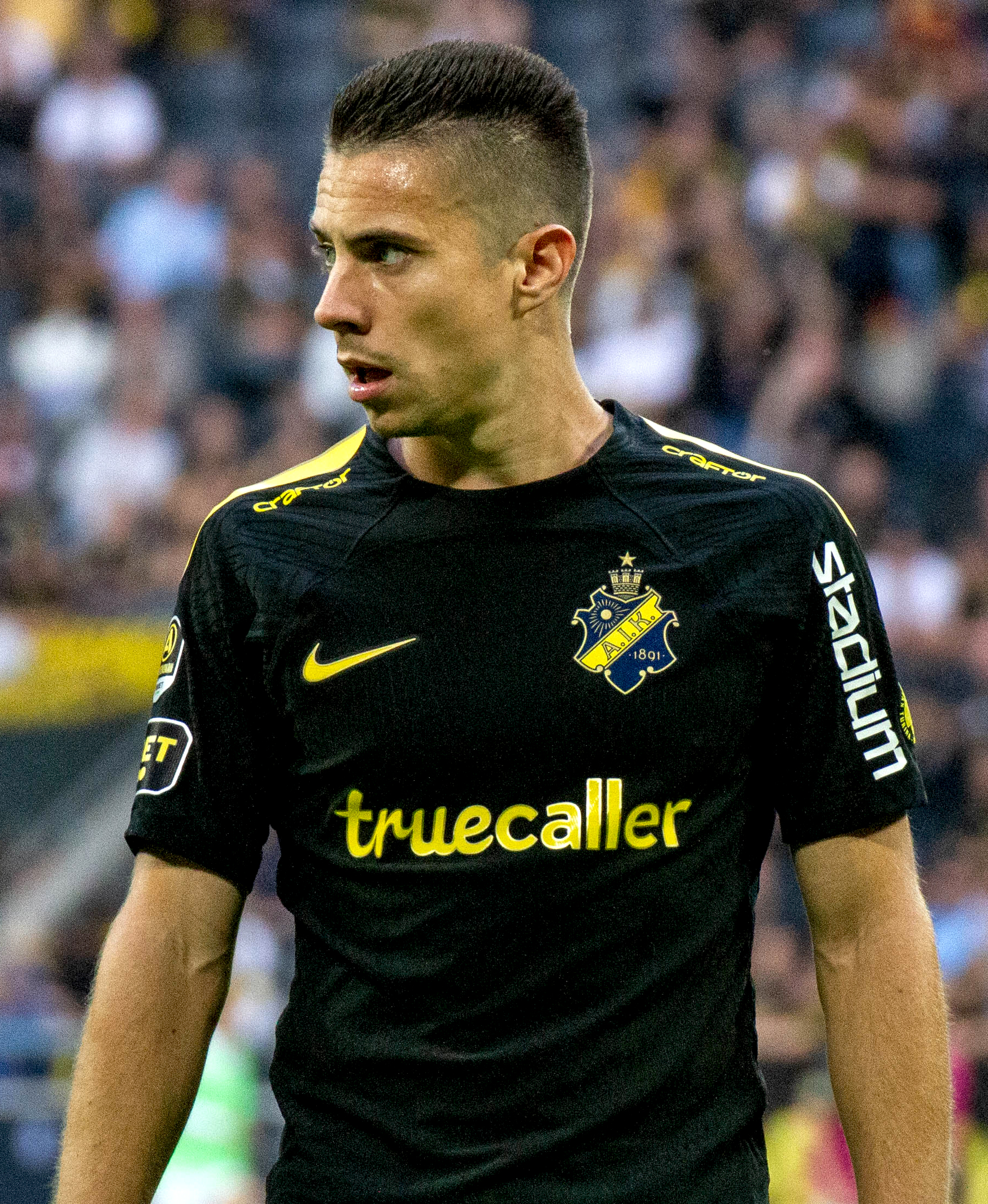
- Beširović playing for AIK in 2023

Personal information
- Date of birth: 31 January 1994 (age 32)
- Place of birth: Viseu, Portugal
- Height: 1.79 m (5 ft 10 in)
- Position: Defensive midfielder

Team information
- Current team: AIK
- Number: 19

Youth career
- 2001–2003: Leixões
- 2003–2004: GD Beira-Mar
- 2004–2012: Slaven Živinice
- 2012–2013: Académico de Viseu

Senior career*
Years	Team	Apps	(Gls)
2012–2013	Académico de Viseu	0	(0)
2013–2014	→ Sampedrense (loan)	26	(4)
2014–2015	NK Priluk		
2015–2018	Radnik Bijeljina	93	(8)
2018–2020	Hajduk Split	5	(0)
2018–2019	Hajduk Split II	6	(0)
2020	→ Mezőkövesd (loan)	16	(5)
2020–2023	Mezőkövesd	90	(18)
2023–	AIK	60	(7)

International career^{‡}
2018–2021	Bosnia and Herzegovina	5	(0)
- * Club domestic league appearances and goals as of 11 May 2026 ‡ National team caps and goals as of 9 October 2025

Dino Beširović (Bosnian pronunciation: [dîːno běʃiːroʋitɕ]; born 31 January 1994) is a professional footballer who plays as a defensive midfielder for AIK. Born in Portugal, he played for the Bosnia and Herzegovina national team.

He started his professional career at Radnik Bijeljina, before joining Hajduk Split in 2018.

== Club career ==
=== Early career ===
Beširović came through Académico de Viseu's youth setup, which he left in February 2015 to join Radnik Bijeljina. He made his professional debut against Široki Brijeg on 28 February at the age of 21. On 15 March, he scored his first professional goal against Slavija.

He became club's captain in 2017.

=== Hajduk Split ===
On 19 June 2018, Beširović was transferred to Croatian side Hajduk Split for an undisclosed fee. He made his competitive debut for the club against Osijek on 29 July. On 2 August, in UEFA Europa League qualifier against Slavia Sofia, he suffered a severe knee injury, which was diagnosed as anterior cruciate ligament tear and was sidelined until the end of season.

=== AIK ===
On 27 June 2023, Beširović was announced at AIK on a two-and-a-half-year contract. On 25 November 2025, he signed a two-year contract extension, lasting until 31 December 2027.

== International career ==
In August 2017, Beširović received his first senior call-up to Bosnia and Herzegovina, for 2018 FIFA World Cup qualifiers against Cyprus and Gibraltar, but had to wait until 28 January 2018 to make his debut, in a friendly game against the United States.

== Personal life ==
His family moved to Portugal two years before his birth, in 1992, during the Bosnian War. Beširović's father, Nail, was also a professional footballer, who played in Portugal most of his career.

== Career statistics ==
=== Club ===
As of match played 2 June 2021

Appearances and goals by club, season and competition
Club	Season	League			Cup		Continental		Total	
Club	Season	Division	Apps	Goals	Apps	Goals	Apps	Goals	Apps	Goals
Académico de Viseu	2012–13	Segunda Divisão	0	0	—		—		0	0
Sampedrense	2013–14	Divisão de Honra	26	2	1 (Note: One appearance in Taça AF Viseu)	0	—		27	2
Radnik Bijeljina	2014–15	Bosnian Premier League	13	1	—		—		13	1
Radnik Bijeljina	2015–16	Bosnian Premier League	22	2	8	0	—		30	2
Radnik Bijeljina	2016–17	Bosnian Premier League	29	1	5	1	2	0	36	2
Radnik Bijeljina	2017–18	Bosnian Premier League	29	4	1	0	—		30	4
Radnik Bijeljina	Total		93	8	14	1	2	0	109	9
Hajduk Split II	2018–19	2. HNL	6	0	—		—		6	0
Hajduk Split	2018–19	1. HNL	3	0	0	0	1	0	4	0
Hajduk Split	2019–20	1. HNL	2	0	1	0	1	0	4	0
Hajduk Split	Total		5	0	1	0	2	0	8	0
Mezőkövesd	2019–20	Nemzeti Bajnokság I	16	5	6	0	—		22	5
Mezőkövesd	2020–21	Nemzeti Bajnokság I	30	6	2	0	—		32	6
Mezőkövesd	Total		46	11	8	0	0	0	54	11
Career total			176	21	24	1	4	0	204	22

=== International ===
As of match played 6 June 2021

Appearances and goals by national team and year
National team	Year	Apps	Goals
Bosnia and Herzegovina	2018	2	0
Bosnia and Herzegovina	2021	2	0
Total		4	0

== Honours ==
Radnik Bijeljina

- Bosnian Cup: 2015–16
