= Ilia Beriashvili =

Georgian footballer

Personal information
- Date of birth: 9 July 1998 (age 28)
- Place of birth: Telavi, Georgia
- Height: 1.90 m (6 ft 3 in)
- Position: Defender

Team information
- Current team: MTK Budapest
- Number: 4

Youth career
- –2014: Kakheti Telavi

Senior career*
Years	Team	Apps	(Gls)
2014	Kakheti Telavi	14	(1)
2015–2016	Alazani Gurjaani		
2017–2021	Telavi	78	(3)
2021–2022	Rotor Volgograd	25	(3)
2022–2023	Telavi	16	(1)
2023–2024	Mezőkövesd	39	(1)
2024–	MTK Budapest	47	(2)

International career^{‡}
2019–2020	Georgia U21	9	(0)
2026–	Georgia	5	(0)
- * Club domestic league appearances and goals as of 30 May 2026 ‡ National team caps and goals as of 26 September 2026

Ilia Beriashvili (Georgian: ილია ბერიაშვილი; born 9 July 1998) is a Georgian footballer who plays for Hungarian club MTK Budapest and the Georgia national team.

== Club career ==
He made his debut in the Russian Football National League for FC Rotor Volgograd on 10 July 2021 in a game against FC Tekstilshchik Ivanovo.

On 13 December 2022, Beriashvili signed with Mezőkövesd in Hungary.
