= Younn Zahary =

Footballer (born 1998)

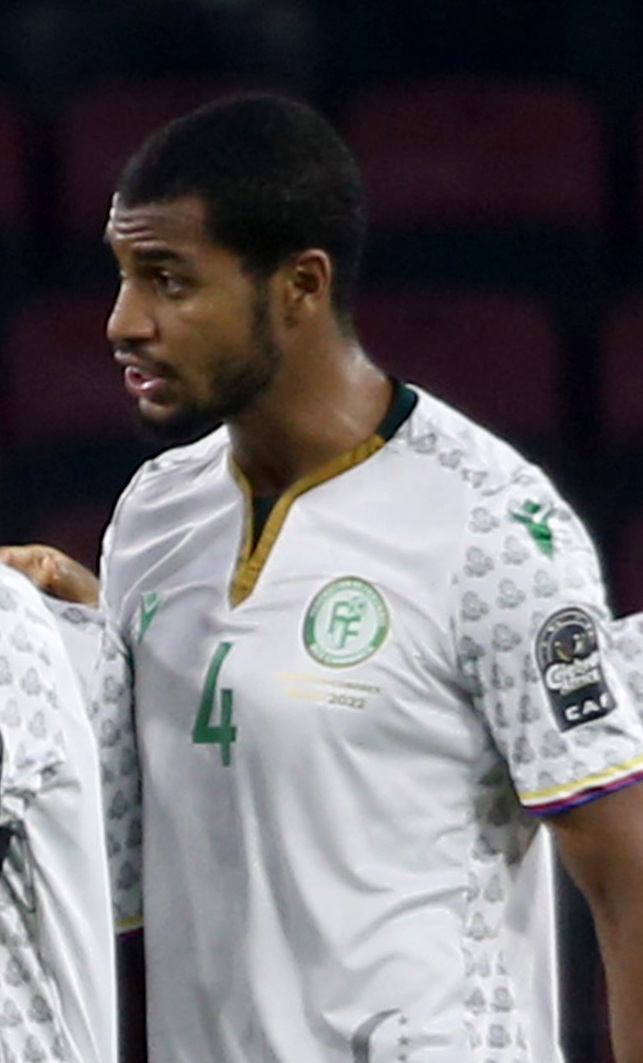
- Zahary in 2022

Personal information
- Date of birth: 20 October 1998 (age 28)
- Place of birth: Nantes, France
- Height: 1.93 m (6 ft 4 in)
- Position: Centre-back

Team information
- Current team: Žalgiris

Youth career
- 2009–2012: La Saint-Pierre
- 2012–2016: Carquefou
- 2016–2017: Caen

Senior career*
Years	Team	Apps	(Gls)
2017–2021	Caen II	22	(1)
2018–2021	Caen	15	(0)
2020–2021	→ Pau FC (loan)	20	(1)
2021–2022	Cholet	25	(0)
2023–2024	Mezőkövesd	10	(0)
2024–	Žalgiris	44	(1)

International career^{‡}
2019–	Comoros	16	(0)
- * Club domestic league appearances and goals as of 26 April 2025 ‡ National team caps and goals as of 19:52, 16 July 2023 (UTC)

Younn Zahary (born 20 October 1998) is a professional footballer who plays as a centre-back for A Lyga club Žalgiris. Born in France, he plays for the Comoros national team.

== Club career ==
Zahary made his debut for Stade Malherbe Caen in a 2–2 Ligue 1 tie with Strasbourg on 9 December 2018. He signed his first professional contract with the club on 14 February 2019.

In January 2020 Zahary joined Pau FC on loan until the end of the 2020–21 season.

On 29 June 2021, he moved to Cholet.

On 18 January 2023, Zahary signed with Mezőkövesd in Hungary.

On 17 February 2024, Zahary moved to Žalgiris in Lithuania.

== International career ==
Zahary was born in France and is of Comorian descent. He represented the Comoros national team in a 1–0 friendly win over Guinea on 12 October 2019.
