= 2025–26 Kazincbarcikai SC season =

Kazincbarcika
2025–26 season
- Manager: Attila Kuttor (From 5 June 2025)
- Stadium: Kolorcity Aréna (Diósgyőri Stadion)
- Nemzeti Bajnokság I: 12th (Relegated to NB II)
- Magyar Kupa: Quarter-final
- Top goalscorer: League: Meshack (4); All: Meshack (4)
- Highest home attendance: 2,981 (v Ferencváros, Nemzeti Bajnokság, R13, 9 November 2025)
- Lowest home attendance: 292 (v Győri ETO, Nemzeti Bajnokság, R5, 3 December 2025)
- Average home league attendance: 869
- Biggest win: 2 goals, three matches
- Biggest defeat: 5 goals, (0–5) (v Zalaegerszeg (A), Nemzeti Bajnokság, R8, 27 September 2025)
- All statistics correct as of 15 May 2026.

The 2025–26 season is Kazincbarcikai SC's 1st competitive season, 1st consecutive season in the Nemzeti Bajnokság I and 76th year in existence as a football club. In addition to the domestic league, Kazincbarcika participate in this season's editions of the Magyar Kupa.

Kazincbarcika won the first match of this season in the Magyar Kupa (Hungarian Cup) and advanced to the top 32 after winning 1-0 in extra time against third-division Iváncsa.

Kazincbarcika plays its home games from Round 1 until Round 18 in Mezőkövesd and from Round 19 until Round 33 Diósgyőri Stadion (Miskolc), as their stadium do not comply with NB I rules.

== Kits ==
Supplier: Puma / Sponsor: Tippmix

Home	Home alt.	Away	Third

Goalkeeper^{1}	Goalkeeper^{2}

== First team squad ==
As of 12 February 2026

Note: Flags indicate national team as defined under FIFA eligibility rules; some limited exceptions apply. Players may hold more than one non-FIFA nationality.

No.	Pos.	Nation	Player
1	GK	HUN	Dániel Gyollai
3	DF	ARM	Varazdat Haroyan
4	DF	CRO	Dominik Mulac
5	DF	HUN	László Rácz
6	MF	HUN	Gergő Szőke
7	FW	HUN	Gábor Makrai
8	MF	HUN	Zsombor Berecz
10	MF	HUN	Bálint Kártik (captain)
11	FW	CRO	Martin Šlogar
13	DF	HUN	Kristóf Polgár
14	DF	NGR	Sodiq Rasheed
15	MF	HUN	Marcell Major (on loan from Puskás Akadémia)
17	FW	HUN	Dániel Prosser
18	MF	HUN	Ronald Schuszter
19	DF	HUN	László Deutsch

No.	Pos.	Nation	Player
23	MF	UKR	Mykhaylo Meskhi
24	DF	HUN	Olivér Kun
25	DF	HUN	Nimród Baranyai (on loan from Újpest)
30	MF	HUN	Zsombor Boros
38	MF	HUN	Bence Sós (on loan from TSC)
42	FW	HUN	Norbert Könyves
44	DF	HUN	Attila Szujó
66	MF	HUN	Bálint Ferencsik
70	FW	NGR	Meshack Ubochioma
72	GK	HUN	Gergő Bánfalvi (on loan from Vasas)
78	MF	HUN	Levente Balázsi
88	FW	HUN	Bence Trencsényi
99	GK	HUN	Bence Juhász (on loan from Újpest)
—	DF	HUN	Vince Nyíri

== Transfers ==
=== Summer ===
In
Date	No.	Pos.	Nat.	Player	Moving from	Fee	Ref.
13 June 2025	18	MF	Hungary	Ronald Schuszter	Kozármisleny (NB II)	Undisclosed	
24 June 2025	23	MF	Ukraine	Mykhaylo Meskhi	Kecskemét	Undisclosed	
26 June 2025	1	GK	Ukraine	Dániel Gyollai	Glentoran	Undisclosed	
27 June 2025	24	DF	Hungary	Olivér Kun	Puskás Akadémia	Undisclosed	
27 June 2025	TBD	FW	Hungary	Barnabás Menyhárt	Bp. Honvéd (NB II)	Undisclosed	
27 June 2025	TBD	DF	Hungary	Bence Szalai	Diósgyőr II (NB III)	Undisclosed	
27 June 2025	4	DF	Croatia	Dominik Mulac	Opatija	Undisclosed	
27 June 2025	11	FW	Croatia	Martin Šlogar	Gorica	Undisclosed	
3 July 2025	17	FW	Hungary	Dániel Prosser	no club	Free agent	
4 July 2025	6	MF	Hungary	Gergő Szőke	MTK	Undisclosed	
4 July 2025	88	FW	Hungary	Bence Trencsényi	Tiszafüred (NB III)	Undisclosed	
10 July 2025	3	DF	Armenia	Varazdat Haroyan	Pyunik Yerevan	Undisclosed	
14 July 2025	42	FW	Hungary	Norbert Könyves	Paks	Free agent	
15 July 2025	32	GK	Hungary	Dávid Dombó	no club	Free agent	
8 August 2025	70	FW	Nigeria	Meshack Ubochioma	Dundee United	Free agent	
11 August 2025	8	MF	Hungary	Zsombor Berecz	Vasas	Free agent	
29 August 2025	14	DF	Nigeria	Sodiq Rasheed	Rabotnichki	Free agent	
4 September 2025	19	DF	Hungary	László Deutsch	Vasas	Undisclosed	
10 September 2025	9	FW	Nigeria	Blessing Eleke	Partizani Tirana	Free agent	

On loan from
Date	No.	Pos.	Nat.	Player	Moving from	Until	Ref.
23 June 2025	38	MF	Hungary	Bence Sós	TSC	30 June 2026	
4 July 2025	72	GK	Hungary	Gergő Bánfalvi	Vasas (NB II)	30 June 2026	
23 July 2025	15	MF	Hungary	Marcell Major	Puskás Akadémia	30 June 2026	
25 July 2025	25	DF	Hungary	Nimród Baranyai	Újpest	30 June 2026	
1 September 2025	99	GK	Hungary	Bence Juhász	Újpest	30 June 2026	

Returned back after loan expired
Date	No.	Pos.	Nat.	Player	Return to	Ref.
16 June 2025	5	DF	Hungary	László Rácz	Pécsi MFC (NB III)	
1 July 2025	25	DF	Hungary	Nimród Baranyai	Újpest	
1 July 2025	14	DF	Hungary	Gergő Csatári	Diósgyőr	
1 July 2025	5	DF	Hungary	Ákos Debreceni	Paks	

Out
Date	No.	Pos.	Nat.	Player	Moving to	Fee	Ref.
13 June 2025	19	FW	Hungary	Bence Pethő	Vasas (NB II)	Undisclosed	
1 July 2025	15	MF	Brazil	Lucas	Tiszakécske (NB II)	Contract expired	
1 July 2025	33	DF	Hungary	József Varga	Tiszakécske (NB II)	Contract expired	
1 July 2025	52	GK	Hungary	Mátyás Király	TBD	Contract expired	
3 July 2025	18	DF	Hungary	Patrik Ternován	TBD	Contract expired	
7 July 2025	1	GK	Hungary	Tamás Fadgyas	TBD	Contract expired	
9 July 2025	27	MF	Hungary	Ádám Bódi	Tiszakécske (NB II)	Undisclosed	
17 July 2025	11	FW	Hungary	Kristóf Herjeczki	Ajka (NB II)	Free agent	
17 July 2025	23	FW	Hungary	Ádám Pintér	Mezőkövesd (NB II)	Free agent	
30 July 2025		FW	Brazil	Myke Ramos	Tiszakécske (NB II)	Undisclosed	
28 November 2025	9	FW	Nigeria	Blessing Eleke	TBD	Sacked	

Returned back after cooperative loan expired
Date	No.	Pos.	Nat.	Player	Moving to	Ref.
1 July 2025	3	DF	Hungary	Benjámin Bacsa	Diósgyőr	
1 July 2025	70	DF	Hungary	Milán Demeter	Diósgyőr	
1 July 2025	24	GK	Hungary	Bence Dojcsák	Diósgyőr	
1 July 2025	83	DF	Hungary	Márk Kristóf	Diósgyőr	
1 July 2025	67	DF	Hungary	Vencel Lajcsik	Diósgyőr	

Out on loan
Date	No.	Pos.	Nat.	Player	Moving to	Loan date	Ref.
19 August 2025		DF	Hungary	Bence Szalai	Dorog (NB II)	30 June 2026	
1 September 2025	32	GK	Hungary	Dávid Dombó	Újpest	30 June 2026	
4 September 2025	77	FW	Hungary	Máté Szabó	Ajka (NB II)	30 June 2026	

=== Contract extension ===
Date	No.	Pos.	Nat.	Player	Extension to	Ref.
28 June 2025	77	FW	Hungary	Máté Szabó	30 June 2026	
3 July 2025	7	FW	Hungary	Gábor Makrai	30 June 2026	

=== New contracts ===
Date	No.	Pos.	Nat.	Player	Moving from	Until	Ref.
23 July 2025		FW	Hungary	Levente Balázsi	Diósgyőr	Undisclosed	
23 July 2025		MF	Hungary	Zsombor Boros	Vasas (NB II)	Undisclosed	
23 July 2025		MF	Hungary	Bálint Ferencsik	Diósgyőr	Undisclosed	
23 July 2025		MF	Hungary	Marcell Major	Puskás Akadémia	On loan until 30 June 2026	

=== Managerial changes ===
Outgoing manager	Manner of departure	Date of vacancy	Position in table	Incoming manager	Date of appointment	Ref.
Gábor Erős	Signed by Vasas	31 May 2025	Pre-season	(Hungary) Attila Kuttor	5 June 2025	

^{c} = Caretaker

== Friendlies ==
Kazincbarcika started the preparation for the 2025/26 season at 23 June 2025.

Win Draw Loss Fixtures

=== Pre-season ===
Summer training camp in Telki Training Center, Hungary from 25 June to 29 June 2025:

27 June 2025 Friendly	Monor (NB III)	1–3	Kazincbarcika	Telki
17:00 CEST	Á. Szlovák 73'	Report	Prosser 17'; M. Szabó 30'; Šlogar 52'	Stadium: Training Center; Attendance: 0 (Closed doors); Referee: Márk Szigetvári; Assistant referees: Vencel Tóth II, Dániel Szalai
Note: • Kazincbarcika 1st half: Fadgyas — Ternován, L. Rácz, Meskhi, Leoni — Szőke, Bódi, Kártik — Prosser, Ramos, M. Szabó • Kazincbarcika 2nd half: G. Bánfalvi — Schuszter, Szujó, B. Szalai (I. Katona (substituted on) 74'), Kun — Mulac, Menyhárt, Herjeczki — Á. Pintér, Šlogar, Trencsényi • Manager: Kuttor

5 July 2025 Friendly	Kazincbarcika	1–0	Mezőkövesd (NB II)	Kazincbarcika
10:30 CEST	Prosser 27'	Report	Zachán (yellow card) 43'	Stadium: Kolorcity Aréna; Attendance: 0 (Closed doors); Referee: Márton Rúsz; Assistant referees: Ákos Berényi, Gyula Punyi
Note: • Kazincbarcika for 60th min.: Gyollai — Szujó, L. Rácz, Meskhi, Sós — Mulac, Szőke, Kártik — Prosser, Ramos (M. Szabó (substituted on) 36'), Šlogar • Kazincbarcika from 61st min.: G. Bánfalvi — Trencsényi, Leoni, B. Szalai, Kun — Menyhárt, Á. Pintér, Schuszter — M. Szabó, Makrai, Herjeczki • Manager: Kuttor

12 July 2025 Friendly	Tatran Prešov (Slovakia II)	2–1	Kazincbarcika	Prešov, Slovakia
17:00 CEST	Wolsztynski 53'; Begala 60'	Report	M. Szabó 1'; Szőke (yellow card) 37'	Stadium: Tatran Arena; Attendance: 2,200
Note: • Kazincbarcika for 60th min.: Gyollai — Szujó, L. Rácz, Meskhi, Sós — Major, Szőke, Kártik — Prosser, Šlogar, M. Szabó • Kazincbarcika from 61st min.: Dombó — Schuszter, Haroyan, Meskhi (Ferencsik (substituted on) 87'), Sós (Kun (substituted on) 87') — Boros, Mulac, M. Tóth — Prosser (Balázsi (substituted on) 80'), Makrai, Trencsényi • Manager: Kuttor

19 July 2025 Friendly	Kazincbarcika	1–1	Michalovce (Slovakia I)	Kazincbarcika
16:00 CEST	Meskhi 33'; Szujó (yellow card) 72'	Report	Paulauskas 79'	Stadium: Kolorcity Aréna; Attendance: 400
Note: • Kazincbarcika: Gyollai — Polgár, (Szujó (substituted on) 60' (substituted off) 72' (Schuszter (substituted on) 72')), Haroyan (L. Rácz (substituted on) 60'), Meskhi, Sós — Szőke, Major, Kártik — Prosser, Šlogar, M. Szabó (Makrai (substituted on) 72') • Manager: Kuttor

=== Mid-season ===
5 September 2025 Friendly	Kazincbarcika	1–2	Karcag (NB II)	Kazincbarcika
12:30 CEST	Makrai 61' (pen.); Berecz (yellow card) 73'	Report	Kaye 52', 66'	Stadium: Kolorcity Aréna; Attendance: 0 (behind closed doors); Referee: Tamás Újhelyi; Assistant referees: Gyula Punyi, Levente Balla
Note: • Kazincbarcika 1st half: Gyollai — Haroyan, Szőke, Kártik, Šlogar, Polgár, Rasheed, Prosser, Meskhi, Sós, Balázsi • Kazincbarcika 2nd half: B. Juhász — L. Rácz, Makrai, Schuszter, Deutsch, Kun, Baranyai, Boros, Sós, Ferencsik, Trencsényi (Berecz (substituted on) 64') • Manager: Kuttor

10 October 2025 Friendly	Mezőkövesd (NB II)	2–1	Kazincbarcika	Mezőkövesd
11:00 CEST	Debreceni 6'; Szalai 88'	Report	Makrai 39'	Stadium: Városi Stadion; Attendance: 0 (behind closed doors); Referee: Róbert Nagy
Note: • Kazincbarcika 1st half: B. Juhász — Baranyai, Haroyan, L. Rácz, Deutsch, Šlogar, Berecz, Szőke, Makrai, Eleke, Meshack • Kazincbarcika 2nd half: Bánfalvi — Ferencsik, Haroyan, L. Rácz, Kun, Prosser, Schuszter, Szőke, Balázsi, Boros, Trencsényi • Manager: Kuttor

10 January 2026 Friendly	Michalovce (Slovakia I)	2–2	Kazincbarcika	Michalovce, Slovakia
12:00 CET	López 2', 7'	Report	Šlogar 18'; Kártik 26' (pen.)	Stadium: Training center Attendance: 50
Note: • Kazincbarcika 1st half: B. Juhász — L. Rácz, Berecz, Kártik, Šlogar, Deutsch, Pukhtieiev, Meskhi, Baranyai, Könyves, Meshack • Kazincbarcika 2nd half: Gyollai — L. Rácz (Szőke (substituted on) 60'), Berecz (Kun (substituted on) 60'), Kártik (Balázsi (substituted on) 60'), Šlogar (Major (substituted on) 60'), Deutsch (Sós (substituted on) 60'), Trencsényi, Meskhi (Ferencsik (substituted on) 60'), Baranyai (Rasheed (substituted on) 60'), Smajlagić, Meshack (Schuszter (substituted on) 60') • Manager: Kuttor

14 January 2026 Friendly	Kazincbarcika	1–0	Karcag (NB II)	Kazincbarcika
	Pukhtieiev 53'	Report		Stadium: Kolorcity Aréna, training pitch Attendance: 0 (behind closed doors); Referee: Mátyás Dédesi Dr. Assistant referees: Balázs Elek, Milán Bense
Note: • Kazincbarcika: B. Juhász (Gyollai (substituted on) 46') — L. Rácz (Rasheed (substituted on) 46'), Berecz (Major (substituted on) 46'), Smajlagić (Pukhtieiev (substituted on) 46'), Kártik (Szőke (substituted on) 46'), Šlogar (Schuszter (substituted on) 46'), Deutsch (Kun (substituted on) 46'), Meskhi (Ferencsik (substituted on) 46'), Baranyai (Balázsi (substituted on) 46'), Könyves, Meshack • Manager: Kuttor

17 January 2026 Friendly	Kazincbarcika	3–1	Košice (Slovakia I)	Kazincbarcika
	Šlogar 47'; Klausz 52'; Könyves 64'	Report	Čerepkai 54'	Stadium: Kolorcity Aréna, training pitch Attendance: 0 (behind closed doors); Referee: Márton Rúsz; Assistant referees: Balázs Szert, Gyula Panyi
Note: • Kazincbarcika: B. Juhász (Gyollai (substituted on) 74') — L. Rácz, Berecz (Schuszter (substituted on) 74'), Smajlagić (Könyves (substituted on) 46'), Kártik (Meskhi (substituted on) 60'), Šlogar (Major (substituted on) 74'), Rasheed (Szőke (substituted on) 60'), Deutsch, Baranyai (Ferencsik (substituted on) 74'), Klausz (Pukhtieiev (substituted on) 60'), Meshack (Kun (substituted on) 74') • Manager: Kuttor

27 March 2026 Friendly	Gesztely (MB I)	v	Kazincbarcika	Gesztely
17:00 CET				Stadium: Tóth-Zele József Sportközpont

== Competitions ==
=== Overall record ===
In italics, we indicate the Last match and the Final position achieved in competition(s) that have not yet been completed.

Competition	First match	Last match	Starting round	Final position	Record							
Competition	First match	Last match	Starting round	Final position	Pld	W	D	L	GF	GA	GD	Win %
Nemzeti Bajnokság I	27 July 2025	15 May 2026	Matchday 1	12th	33	6	4	23	31	70	−39	18.18
Magyar Kupa	13 September 2025	4 March 2026	Round of 32	Quarter-final	4	3	0	1	3	5	−2	75.00
Total					37	9	4	24	34	75	−41	24.32

Last updated: 15 May 2026
Source: Soccerway

=== Nemzeti Bajnokság I ===
==== League table ====
Pos	Team	Pld	W	D	L	GF	GA	GD	Pts	Qualification or relegation
8	Kisvárda	33	11	7	15	36	49	−13	40	
9	Nyíregyháza	33	10	10	13	47	57	−10	40	
10	MTK	33	9	11	13	55	62	−7	38	
11	Diósgyőr (R)	33	6	10	17	39	65	−26	28	Relegation to the Nemzeti Bajnokság II
12	Kazincbarcika (R)	33	6	4	23	31	70	−39	22	Relegation to the Nemzeti Bajnokság II

Source: Hungarian Football Federation (in Hungarian)
Rules for classification: 1) Points; 2) Matches won; 3) Goal difference; 4) Goals scored; 5) Head-to-head points; 6) Head-to-head goal difference; 7) Fair play ranking; 8) Drawing of lots.
(R) Relegated

==== Results summary ====
Overall								Home						Away					
Pld	W	D	L	GF	GA	GD	Pts	W	D	L	GF	GA	GD	W	D	L	GF	GA	GD
33	6	4	23	31	70	−39	22	3	2	12	13	33	−20	3	2	11	18	37	−19

Last updated: 15 May 2026.
Source: Soccerway

==== Matches ====
Win Draw Loss Fixtures Postponed

The draw for the 2025/26 season was held on 16 June 2025.

27 July 2025 1	Puskás Akadémia	2–1	Kazincbarcika	Felcsút
20:00 CEST	Colley 47', 52'; Maceiras (yellow card) 57'	Report	Ferencsik (yellow card) 90+1'; Sós 90+2'	Stadium: Pancho Aréna; Attendance: 1,284; Referee: József Erdős; Assistant referees: Dániel Szalai, Viktor Nagy
Note: • Kazincbarcika: Gyollai — Polgár, Haroyan, Meskhi, Sós — Kártik (c), M. Szabó (Makrai (substituted on) 63'), Szőke, Prosser (Könyves (substituted on) 46'), Major (Ferencsik (substituted on) 84') — Šlogar (Baranyai (substituted on) 80') • Manager: Kuttor • Player of the match: Lamin Colley, Puskás Akadémia 10.0 • Best player of Kazincbarcika: Bence Sós 7.5

2 August 2025 2	Ferencváros	3–0	Kazincbarcika	Budapest
20:15 CEST	Raemaekers (yellow card) 9'; Kanichowsky 12'; B. Varga 26'; Zachariassen (yellow card) 61'; Cissé (yellow card) 78'; Gruber 83' (pen.)	Report	Major (yellow card) 28'; Haroyan (yellow card) 29'; Szőke (yellow card) 30'; Sós (yellow card) 73'; Baranyai (yellow card) 82'	Stadium: Ferencváros Stadion; Attendance: 8,325; Referee: Péter Antal; Assistant referees: Balázs Buzás, Péter Garai
Note: • Kazincbarcika: Gyollai — Polgár, Haroyan, Meskhi, Baranyai — M. Szabó (Makrai (substituted on) 78'), Major (Ferencsik (substituted on) 84') — Kártik (c) (Šlogar (substituted on) 84'), Sós, Szőke (Schuszter (substituted on) 84') — Könyves • Manager: Kuttor • Player of the match: Zsombor Gruber, Ferencváros 10.0 • Best player of Kazincbarcika: Gergő Szőke 7.8

8 August 2025 3	Kazincbarcika	1–2	Debrecen	Mezőkövesd
20:00 CEST	Haroyan 46'; Gyollai (yellow card) 63'; Könyves (yellow card) 78'	Report	D. Kocsis (yellow card) 23'; M. Szécsi 19' (yellow card) 54'; Dzsudzsák (yellow card) 54' (goal) 65' (pen.)	Stadium: Városi Stadion; Attendance: 1,349; Referee: Bence Hanyecz; Assistant referees: Balázs Szalai, Bence Belicza
Note: • Kazincbarcika: Gyollai — Schuszter (Šlogar (substituted on) 74'), Haroyan, Meskhi, Baranyai, Sós — Szőke (Makrai (substituted on) 83'), Kártik, M. Szabó (Meshack (substituted on) 65') — Könyves, Major (Ferencsik (substituted on) 83') • Manager: Kuttor • Player of the match: Varazdat Haroyan, Kazincbarcika 8.1 • Best player of Debrecen: Márk Szécsi 7.5

16 August 2025 4	Diósgyőr	2–2	Kazincbarcika	Miskolc
18:15 CEST	Megyeri (yellow card) 1'; Demeter (yellow card) 31'; D. Gera (yellow card) 47'; Babós (yellow card) 50'; Vallejo (yellow card) 62'; Babos 74'; Tamás (yellow card) 78'; Šaponjić 90+5' (pen.)	Report	Sós (penalty missed) 3'; Baranyai 16'; Meshack 18'; Szőke (yellow card) 84'; Makrai (yellow card) 90'; Haroyan (yellow card) 90+4'	Stadium: Diósgyőri Stadion; Attendance: 5,468; Referee: Gergő Bogár; Assistant referees: Zoltán Horváth, Dávid Rózsa
Note: • Kazincbarcika: Gyollai — Baranyai, Haroyan, Meskhi, Polgár, Sós — Szőke, Kártik (c) (Rácz (substituted on) 89'), Major (Ferencsik (substituted on) 83') — Šlogar (Makrai (substituted on) 76'), Meshack (Prosser (substituted on) 76') • Manager: Kuttor • Player of the match: Meshack Ubochioma, Kazincbarcika 8.2 • Best player of Diósgyőr: Ivan Šaponjić 8.1

29 August 2025 6	Paks	3–0	Kazincbarcika	Paks
20:00 CEST	Papp (yellow card) 22'; Gyurkits (penalty missed) 43'; B. Tóth 55'; Kinyik (yellow card) 69'; Böde 70'; Baranyai 89' (o.g.)	Report	Szőke (yellow card) 15'; Major (yellow card) 53'; Šlogar (yellow card) 69'	Stadium: Fehérvári úti Stadion; Attendance: 2,689; Referee: József Erdős; Assistant referees: Péter Kóbor, Georgiou Theodoros
Note: • Kazincbarcika: Gyollai — Polgár, Haroyan, Meskhi (Rasheed (substituted on) 89') — Baranyai, Kártik (c), Szőke (Schuszter (substituted on) 64'), Major (Balázsi (substituted on) 89'), Sós — Meshack (M. Szabó (substituted on) 51'), Šlogar (Makrai (substituted on) 89') • Manager: Kuttor (yellow card) 57' • Player of the match: Dániel Gyollai, Kazincbarcika 9.8 • Best player of Paks: Kevin Horváth 9.0

20 September 2025 7	Kazincbarcika	2–0	Újpest	Mezőkövesd
18:00 CEST	Meshack 17' (yellow card) 23'; Sós 28'; Haroyan (yellow card) 34'; Gyollai (yellow card) 73'; Kártik (yellow card) 82'; Meskhi (yellow card) 89'	Report	Duarte (yellow card) 35'; Medeiros (yellow card) 42'; Kr. Horváth (yellow card) 60'; Fiola (yellow card) 70'	Stadium: Városi Stadion; Attendance: 1,395; Referee: Attila Molnár; Assistant referees: Balázs Szert, Bence Belicza
Note: • Kazincbarcika: Gyollai — Polgár, Haroyan, Rasheed, Sós — Berecz, Meskhi, Kártik (c) (Szőke (substituted on) 85') — Meshack (Schuszter (substituted on) 70'), Könyves (Eleke (substituted on) 79'), Balázsi (Kun (substituted on) 79') • Manager: Kuttor • Player of the match: Bence Sós, Kazincbarcika 8.3 • Best player of Újpest: Gleofilo Vlijter 7.0

27 September 2025 8	Zalaegerszeg	5–0	Kazincbarcika	Zalaegerszeg
15:30 CEST	João Victor 11'; Csonka (yellow card) 45+1'; Maxsuell 48'; Borges (yellow card) 60' (yellow-red card) 71'; Daniel 67'; B. Kiss 77', 78'	Report	Berecz (yellow card) 13'; Haroyan (yellow card) 26'; Meskhi (yellow card) 39'; Eleke (yellow card) 63'	Stadium: ZTE Arena; Attendance: 2,141; Referee: Marcell Derdák; Assistant referees: Norbert Bornemissza, Georgiou Theodoros
Note: • Kazincbarcika: Gyollai — Polgár, Haroyan, Rasheed, Sós – Meskhi (Szőke (substituted on) 54') — Meshack, Berecz (Makrai (substituted on) 87'), Kártik (c) (Eleke (substituted on) 54'), Boros (Kun (substituted on) 54') — Könyves (Schuszter (substituted on) 54') • Manager: Kuttor • Player of the match: Bence Kiss, Zalaegerszeg 9.1 • Best player of Kazincbarcika: Mykhaylo Meskhi 6.8

3 October 2025 9	Kazincbarcika	3–1	MTK	Mezőkövesd
20:00 CEST	Kártik 12' (pen.); Meshack 19'; Šlogar 45+1'; Sós (yellow card) 63'	Report	Á. Molnár (yellow card) 63'; K. Németh 90+1'	Stadium: Városi Stadion; Attendance: 532; Referee: Imre Kovács; Assistant referees: Zoltán Horváth, Dávid Rózsa
Note: • Kazincbarcika: Gyollai — Baranyai, Polgár, Rasheed, Sós — Meskhi — Kun, Šlogar, Kártik (c), Meshack (Schuszter (substituted on) 82') — Eleke (Könyves (substituted on) 66') • Manager: Kuttor • Player of the match: Martin Šlogar, Kazincbarcika 7.9 • Best player of MTK: Krisztián Németh 7.6

19 October 2025 10	Kazincbarcika	0–1	Kisvárda	Mezőkövesd
13:15 CEST	Sós (yellow card) 32'; Šlogar (yellow card) 44'	Report	Mešanović 18'; Be. Bíró (yellow card) 66'; D. Soltész (yellow card) 71'; Matanović (yellow card) 90+2'	Stadium: Városi Stadion; Attendance: 632; Referee: Balázs Berke; Assistant referees: Vencel Tóth II, István Szécsényi
Note: • Kazincbarcika: Gyollai (Juhász (substituted on) 87') — Baranyai, Polgár, Rasheed, Sós — Šlogar, Meskhi, Kártik (c), Kun (Balázsi (substituted on) 63' (substituted off) 87' (Makrai (substituted on) 87')) — Meshack (Berecz (substituted on) 78'), Eleke (Könyves (substituted on) 63') • Manager: Kuttor • Player of the match: Dominik Soltész, Kisvárda 8.7 • Best player of Kazincbarcika: Sodiq Rasheed 7.3

25 October 2025 11	Nyíregyháza	0–1	Kazincbarcika	Nyíregyháza
19:30 CEST	Ke. Varga (yellow card) 4' (yellow-red card) 10'; Edomwonyi (yellow card) 79'	Report	Rasheed (yellow card) 1'; Meskhi (yellow card) 26'; Könyves 48'; Polgár (yellow card) 49'; Szőke (yellow card) 90+5'	Stadium: Városi Stadion; Attendance: 4,098; Referee: Tamás Bognár; Assistant referees: Gergő Vígh-Tarsonyi, Dániel Szalai
Note: • Kazincbarcika: Juhász — Baranyai, Polgár, Rasheed, Sós — Meskhi — Šlogar (Szőke (substituted on) 90+3'), Kártik (c), Berecz, Meshack (Deutsch (substituted on) 80') — Könyves (Eleke (substituted on) 80') • Manager: Kuttor • Player of the match: Sodiq Rasheed, Kazincbarcika 8.8 • Best player of Nyíregyháza: Attila Temesvári 7.8

1 November 2025 12	Kazincbarcika	1–3	Puskás Akadémia	Mezőkövesd
13:15 CET	Šlogar 37'; Meskhi (yellow card) 74'; Deutsch (yellow card) 90'	Report	P. Dárdai 29'; Golla (yellow card) 54'; Szolnoki (yellow card) 55'; Golla 85'; Lukács 90+4'	Stadium: Városi Stadion; Attendance: 636; Referee: Mihály Káprály; Assistant referees: István Albert, Gergő Vígh-Tarsonyi
Note: • Kazincbarcika: Juhász — Baranyai, Polgár, Rasheed, Sós — Meskhi — Meshack, Kártik (c) (Szőke (substituted on) 80'), Berecz (Deutsch (substituted on) 75'), Šlogar — Könyves (Eleke (substituted on) 80' (substituted off) 88' (Balázsi (substituted on) 88')) • Manager: Kuttor • Player of the match: Wojciech Golla, Puskás Akadémia 8.2 • Best player of Kazincbarcika: Martin Šlogar 7.3

9 November 2025 13	Kazincbarcika	1–3	Ferencváros	Mezőkövesd
15:15 CET	Kártik 11' (pen.); Rasheed (yellow card) 48'	Report	B. Varga 35'; Tóth 43'; Makreckis 82'	Stadium: Városi Stadion; Attendance: 2,981; Referee: Balázs Berke; Assistant referees: Bence Belicza, Viktor Nagy
Note: • Kazincbarcika: Gyollai — Baranyai, Haroyan (Szőke (substituted on) 87'), Rasheed, Sós — Meskhi (Rácz (substituted on) 90+3') — Šlogar (Schuszter (substituted on) 87'), Kártik (c), Major (Kun (substituted on) 65'), Meshack — Könyves (Trencsényi (substituted on) 87') • Manager: Kuttor • Player of the match: Alex Tóth, Ferencváros 8.2 • Best player of Kazincbarcika: Varazdat Haroyan 7.3

22 November 2025 14	Debrecen	2–1	Kazincbarcika	Debrecen
17:00 CET	Cibla (yellow card) 48'; Dzsudzsák 50'; Komáromi 78'	Report	Haroyan (yellow card) 33'; Szőke (yellow card) 43'; Kártik 72' (pen.)	Stadium: Nagyerdei Stadion; Attendance: 3,514; Referee: Péter Antal; Assistant referees: Gergely Becséri, Dávid Rózsa
Note: • Kazincbarcika: Juhász — Baranyai, Rasheed, Haroyan (Rácz (substituted on) 81') — Kártik (c), Sós (Deutsch (substituted on) 44'), Šlogar, Szőke (Major (substituted on) 81') — Könyves, Meshack, Trencsényi (Kun (substituted on) 81') • Manager: Kuttor • Player of the match: Balázs Dzsudzsák, Debrecen 8.3 • Best player of Kazincbarcika: Bálint Kártik 7.5

29 November 2025 15	Kazincbarcika	1–1	Diósgyőr	Mezőkövesd
14:30 CET	Meskhi 31'; Rasheed (yellow card) 46'; Šlogar (yellow card) 54'; Rácz (yellow card) 68'; Deutsch (yellow card) 70'; Meshack (yellow card) 71'	Report	D. Gera (yellow card) 19'; Má. Mucsányi 26'	Stadium: Városi Stadion; Attendance: 1,504; Referee: Marcell Derdák; Assistant referees: Vencel Tóth II, Gergő Vígh-Tarsonyi
Note: • Kazincbarcika: Juhász — Baranyai, Rácz, Rasheed, Deutsch — Meskhi, Kártik (c) — Major (Schuszter (substituted on) 90'), Meshack, Šlogar — Trencsényi (Könyves (substituted on) 20') • Manager: Kuttor • Player of the match: Elton Acolatse, Diósgyőr 8.1 • Best player of Kazincbarcika: Bálint Kártik 7.5

3 December 2025 5	Kazincbarcika	1–3	Győri ETO	Mezőkövesd
18:00 CET	Major (yellow card) 7'; Makrai 46'; Deutsch (yellow card) 66'; Szőke (yellow card) 84'	Report	Vlădoiu (yellow card) 16'; Vingler (yellow card) 29' (yellow-red card) 77'; Vitális 36'; Bánáti 61'; Gavrić 74'	Stadium: Városi Stadion; Attendance: 292; Referee: Bence Csonka dr. Assistant referees: Balázs Buzás, Balázs Szert
Note: • Kazincbarcika: Juhász — Baranyai, Rácz, Rasheed, Deutsch — Meskhi (Szőke (substituted on) 65'), Kártik (c) — Major (Könyves (substituted on) 46'), Meshack (Szujó (substituted on) 86'), Šlogar (Balázsi (substituted on) 84') — Schuszter (Makrai (substituted on) 46') • Manager: Kuttor • Player of the match: Balázs Megyeri, Győri ETO 8.4 • Best player of Kazincbarcika: Gábor Makrai 7.6

7 December 2025 16	Győri ETO	3–1	Kazincbarcika	Győr
13:15 CET	Gavrić 18'; Štefulj 44'; Huszár 90+1'	Report	Rácz 56'; Kártik (yellow card) 77'	Stadium: ETO Park; Attendance: 3,960; Referee: Mihály Káprály; Assistant referees: Dávid Rózsa, Viktor Nagy
Note: • Kazincbarcika: Gyollai — Baranyai, Rácz, Rasheed, Deutsch (Šlogar (substituted on) 46') — Balázsi (Major (substituted on) 46'), Meskhi, Kártik (c), Szőke — Könyves (Schuszter (substituted on) 90+4'), Meshack (Makrai (substituted on) 53') • Manager: Kuttor • Player of the match: Daniel Štefulj, Győri ETO 9.2 • Best player of Kazincbarcika: László Rácz 7.3

14 December 2025 17	Kazincbarcika	0–2	Paks	Mezőkövesd
12:15 CET	Šlogar (yellow card) 13'; Rasheed (yellow card) 73'	Report	Á. Szendrei 41', 60' (yellow card) 45'; M. Szekszárdi (yellow card) 64'; B. Balogh (yellow card) 67'; Haraszti (yellow card) 90+2'	Stadium: Városi Stadion; Attendance: 394; Referee: Attila Molnár; Assistant referees: Zoltán Horváth, Péter Ország
Note: • Kazincbarcika: Juhász — Baranyai, Rácz (Makrai (substituted on) 62'), Rasheed, Deutsch (Meshack (substituted on) 46') — Szőke, Meskhi, Kártik (c) (Major (substituted on) 80'), Sós — Šlogar (Prosser (substituted on) 80'), Könyves • Manager: Kuttor • Player of the match: Attila Osváth, Paks 8.3 • Best player of Kazincbarcika: Bence Juhász 7.9

21 December 2025 18	Újpest	2–1	Kazincbarcika	Budapest
15:00 CET	Lacoux (yellow card) 42'; Kr. Horváth (yellow card) 50'; Tučić 63'; João Nunes 84'; Fiola (yellow card) 88'	Report	Meskhi (yellow card) 20' (yellow-red card) 81'; Meshack 67'; Kun (yellow card) 80'; Berecz (yellow card) 88'	Stadium: Szusza Ferenc Stadion; Attendance: 4,520; Referee: Péter Zierkelbach; Assistant referees: Péter Garai, István Szécsényi
Note: • Kazincbarcika: Gyollai — Šlogar (Ferencsik (substituted on) 85'), Szujó (Szőke (substituted on) 63'), Rácz, Rasheed, Deutsch — Major (Kun (substituted on) 58'), Kártik (c) (Berecz (substituted on) 58'), Meskhi — Meshack, Makrai (Könyves (substituted on) 46') • Manager: Kuttor • Player of the match: Milan Tučić, Újpest 8.1 • Best player of Kazincbarcika: Meshack 7.8

25 January 2026 19	Kazincbarcika	0–1	Zalaegerszeg	Miskolc
15:00 CET	Juhász (red card) 63'; Deutsch (yellow card) 79'; Pukhtieiev (yellow card) 84'	Report	B. Kiss 76'	Stadium: Diósgyőri Stadion; Attendance: 437; Referee: Mihály Káprály; Assistant referees: Gergely Becséri, Dávid Rózsa
Note: • Kazincbarcika: Juhász — Berecz, Rácz, Rasheed (Radkowski (substituted on) 39'), Deutsch — Slogar, Baranyai, Kártik (c) (Pukhtieiev (substituted on) 81'), Klausz (Schuszter (substituted on) 46') — Meshack (Ikoba (substituted on) 66'), Könyves (Gyollai (substituted on) 66') • Manager: Kuttor • Player of the match: Norbert Szendrei, Zalaegerszeg 8.2 • Best player of Kazincbarcika: Bence Juhász 7.4

31 January 2026 20	MTK	1–3	Kazincbarcika	Budapest
13:30 CET	Polievka 45'; Varju (yellow card) 48'; H. Németh (yellow card) 72'	Report	Rácz 3' (yellow card) 85'; Radkowski 44'; Šlogar (yellow card) 72'; Major 75'	Stadium: Hidegkuti Nándor Stadion; Attendance: 2,343; Referee: Tamás Bognár; Assistant referees: Vencel Tóth II, Péter Ország
Note: • Kazincbarcika: Gyollai — Ferenczi, Radkowski, Rácz, Baranyai — Berecz, Meskhi — Major (Ferencsik (substituted on) 90+1'), Kártik (c) (Šlogar (substituted on) 64'), Meshack (Smajlagić (substituted on) 90+1') — Ikoba (Könyves (substituted on) 46') • Manager: Kuttor • Player of the match: Viktor Vitályos, MTK 8.5 • Best player of Kazincbarcika: László Rácz 7.9

6 February 2026 21	Kisvárda	1–0	Kazincbarcika	Kisvárda
17:45 CET	Chlumecký (yellow card) 82'; Cipetić 89' (pen.) (yellow card) 89'	Report	Meskhi (yellow card) 42'; Klausz (yellow card) 59'; Baranyai (yellow card) 86'	Stadium: Várkerti Stadion; Attendance: 1,283; Referee: Gergő Bogár; Assistant referees: István Szécsényi, Gergely Becséri
Note: • Kazincbarcika: Gyollai — Baranyai, Radkowski, Rácz, Ferenczi — Berecz, Meskhi (Pukhtieiev (substituted on) 90') — Meshack (Major (substituted on) 76'), Kártik (c), Deutsch (Smajlagić (substituted on) 90') — Klausz (Könyves (substituted on) 76') • Manager: Kuttor • Player of the match: Nikola Radmanovac, Kisvárda 8.2 • Best player of Kazincbarcika: Dániel Gyollai 7.1

15 February 2026 22	Kazincbarcika	0–4	Nyíregyháza	Miskolc
15:30 CET	Smajlagić (yellow card) 9'; Gyollai (yellow card) 45'; Rácz (yellow card) 63'	Report	Baranyai 8' (o.g.); Kvasina 39'; Tijani 45' (pen.); B. Katona (yellow card) 83'; Oláh 90+1'	Stadium: Diósgyőri Stadion; Attendance: 1,005; Referee: Balázs Berke; Assistant referees: Vencel Tóth II, Norbert Bornemissza
Note: • Kazincbarcika: Gyollai (Juhász (substituted on) 46') — Ferenczi, Radkowski, Rácz, Baranyai (Nyíri (substituted on) 46') — Kártik (c), Meskhi, Berecz — Klausz (Könyves (substituted on) 46'), Smajlagić, Šlogar (Meshack (substituted on) 18') • Manager: Kuttor • Player of the match: Marko Kvasina, Nyíregyháza 8.2 • Best player of Kazincbarcika: Meshack Ubochioma 6.9

21 February 2026 23	Kazincbarcika	0–2	Puskás Akadémia	Miskolc
16:15 CET	Rácz (yellow card) 19'; Nyíri (yellow card) 46'; Kártik (yellow card) 50'	Report	Golla 5' (yellow card) 30'; Szolnoki (yellow card) 23'; Lukács 40'; Maceiras (yellow card) 78'; Kern (yellow card) 88'	Stadium: Diósgyőri Stadion; Attendance: 320; Referee: Ferenc Karakó; Assistant referees: Balázs Szert, Bence Belicza
Note: • Kazincbarcika: Juhász — Nyíri, Rácz, Radkowski, Ferenczi — Kártik (c) (Trencsényi (substituted on) 75'), Szőke (Meskhi (substituted on) 46'), Berecz (Schuszter (substituted on) 82') — Meshack, Klausz (Major (substituted on) 75') — Smajlagić (Könyves (substituted on) 46') • Manager: Kuttor • Player of the match: Wojciech Golla, Puskás Akadémia 8.5 • Best player of Kazincbarcika: Milán Klausz 7.3

1 March 2026 24	Ferencváros	2–1	Kazincbarcika	Budapest
18:45 CET	Yusuf (yellow card) 87'; Kovačević 87'; Levi 90+4'		Rácz (yellow card) 38'; Könyves 60' (yellow card) 86'; Berecz (yellow card) 87'; Klausz (yellow card) 90+1'	Stadium: Groupama Aréna; Attendance: 6,913; Referee: Bence Csonka dr. Assistant referees: Vencel Tóth II, Georgiou Theodoros
Note: • Kazincbarcika: Juhász — Baranyai, Rácz, Zs. Nagy (Smajlagić (substituted on) 89'), Ferenczi – Berecz, Szőke (Major (substituted on) 71'), Kártik (c) (Könyves (substituted on) 58') – Klausz, Meshack (Radkowski (substituted on) 58'), Schuszter (Nyíri (substituted on) 71') • Manager: Kuttor • Player of the match: Bence Juhász, Kazincbarcika 8.4 • Best player of Ferencváros: Gábor Szalai 8.1

8 March 2026 25	Kazincbarcika	0–3	Debrecen	Miskolc
17:45 CET	Berecz (yellow card) 35'; Radkowski (yellow card) 64'	Report	Gordić 23'; Batik (yellow card) 31'; Bárány 68'; Hoffmann (yellow card) 72'; Youga (yellow card) 75'; Dzsudzsák 81'	Stadium: Diósgyőri Stadion; Attendance: 929; Referee: Marcell Derdák; Assistant referees: József Aradi, Viktor Nagy
Note: • Player of the match: Balázs Dzsudzsák, Debrecen 8.0 • Best player of Kazincbarcika: Bence Trencsényi 7.5

13 March 2026 26	Diósgyőr	0–4	Kazincbarcika	Miskolc
17:45 CET		Report	Meskhi 11'; Kártik 45+7' (pen.); Nyíri 71'; Ikoba 74'	Stadium: Diósgyőri Stadion; Attendance: 2,114; Referee: Péter Antal; Assistant referees: Balázs Szert, Dániel Szalai

22 March 2026 27	Kazincbarcika	1–3	Győri ETO	Miskolc
16:45 CET	Klausz 11'; Meskhi (yellow card) 40'	Report	R. Tóth (yellow card) 31'; Vitális 38', 79'; Schön (yellow card) 54'; Ba. Bíró 65'; Miangué (yellow card) 90'	Stadium: Diósgyőri Stadion; Attendance: 483; Referee: Mihály Káprály; Assistant referees: Balázs Buzás, István Albert
Note: • Kazincbarcika: B. Kocsis — Nyíri, Rácz, Radkowski, Zs. Nagy — Schuszter (Szőke (substituted on) 80'), Meskhi (Major (substituted on) 80'), Kártik (c), Klausz (Ikoba (substituted on) 64') — Trencsényi (Smajlagić (substituted on) 46'), Ferenczi (Baranyai (substituted on) 71') • Manager: Kuttor • Player of the match: Milán Vitális, Győri ETO 9.4 • Best player of Kazincbarcika: Milán Klausz 7.2

4 April 2026 28	Paks	5–1	Kazincbarcika	Paks
17:00 CEST	Á. Szendrei 14', 65'; B. Balogh (yellow card) 22'; Gyurkits (yellow card) 68'; Böde 82', 89'; Ádám 90+4' (pen.)	Report	Szőke (yellow card) 43'; Pukhtieiev (yellow card) 61' (goal) 80'; Kártik (yellow card) 64'; Rácz (yellow card) 74'; Juhász (yellow card) 90+4'	Stadium: Fehérvári úti Stadion; Attendance: 2,410; Referee: Bence Hanyecz; Assistant referees: Balázs Buzás, István Szécsényi

11 April 2026 29	Kazincbarcika	0–3	Újpest	Miskolc
15:15 CEST	Pukhtieiev (yellow card) 39'; Meskhi (yellow card) 51'; Ferenczi (yellow card) 51'	Report	Krajcsovics 16'; Nyíri 49' (o.g.); Mi. Mucsányi 90+1'	Stadium: Diósgyőri Stadion; Attendance: 865; Referee: Marcell Derdák; Assistant referees: Bence Belicza, Dániel Szalai

18 April 2026 30	Zalaegerszeg	4–0	Kazincbarcika	Zalaegerszeg
14:15 CEST	Daniel 13'; Skribek 41'; N. Szendrei 45' (pen.); B. Kiss (yellow card) 49' (goal) 56'; Teixeira (yellow card) 90+1'	Report	Ferenczi (yellow card) 36'; Zs. Nagy (red card) 43'	Stadium: ZTE Arena; Attendance: 2,889; Referee: Imre Kovács; Assistant referees: Péter Ország, Viktor Nagy
Note: • Kazincbarcika: Juhász — Nyíri, Rácz, Radkowski, Zs. Nagy — Smajlagić (Klausz (substituted on) 59'), Meskhi, Kártik (c) (Szőke (substituted on) 75'), Ferenczi (Deutsch (substituted on) 79') — Trencsényi (Schuszter (substituted on) 59'), Ikoba (Sebők (substituted on) 79') • Manager: Kuttor • Player of the match: Bence Kiss, Zalaegerszeg 8.3 • Best player of Kazincbarcika: Vince Nyíri 7.2

24 April 2026 31	Kazincbarcika	0–0	MTK	Miskolc
20:00 CEST	Könyves (yellow card) 22'; Rácz (yellow card) 49'	Report	Kata (yellow card) 58'	Stadium: Diósgyőri Stadion; Attendance: 891; Referee: Attila Molnár; Assistant referees: Bence Belicza, Dániel Szalai
Note: • Kazincbarcika: Juhász — Nyíri, Rácz, Radkowski, Deutsch — Schuszter (Pukhtieiev (substituted on) 65'), Meskhi, Kártik (c) (Major (substituted on) 83'), Szőke (Ferenczi (substituted on) 83') — Könyves (Ikoba (substituted on) 74'), Trencsényi (Meshack (substituted on) 65') • Manager: Kuttor • Player of the match: Bence Juhász, Zalaegerszeg 8.0 • Best player of MTK: Tamás Kádár 7.9

2 May 2026 32	Kazincbarcika	2–1	Kisvárda	Miskolc
16:00 CEST	Meskhi (yellow card) 10'; Schuszter (yellow card) 17'; Szőke 21'; Zs. Nagy 45+2'; Kártik (yellow card) 53'; Deutsch (yellow card) 65'	Report	Szőr (yellow card) 6'; Novothny 64'; D. Soltész (yellow card) 86'	Stadium: Diósgyőri Stadion; Attendance: 503; Referee: Imre Kovács; Assistant referees: István Széchenyi, Tibor Csatári
Note: • Kazincbarcika: Juhász — Baranyai, Zs. Nagy, Rácz, Deutsch (Meshack (substituted on) 75') — Meskhi, Szőke (Ferenczi (substituted on) 75') — Schuszter, Kártik (c) (Pukhtieiev (substituted on) 61'), Trencsényi (Major (substituted on) 61') — Könyves • Manager: Kuttor • Player of the match: Gergő Szőke, Kazincbarcika 7.6 • Best player of Kisvárda: Soma Novothny 7.3

15 May 2026 33	Nyíregyháza	2–2	Kazincbarcika	Nyíregyháza
17:45 CEST	Tijani (yellow card) 4'; Kvasina 6'; Benczenleitner (yellow card) 10'; Kovácsréti 75'	Report	Ferenczi 66'; Szőke (yellow card) 69'; Major (yellow card) 77'; Trencsényi 86'; Klausz (yellow card) 90'	Stadium: Városi Stadion; Attendance: 6,844; Referee: Péter Antal; Assistant referees: Balázs Buzás, Norbert Bornemissza

Note: Puskás Akadémia FC, interested in the UEFA Conference League qualifiers, officially requested the exchange of the right to choose the venue for the Kazincbarcika–Puskás Akadémia match to be held in the 1st round of the Fizz League (Nemzeti Bajnokság I).
Note: Győri ETO FC, who advanced in the UEFA Conference League, applied to the MLSZ (Hungarian Football Federation) Competition Committee with a unilateral postponement request, which examined the contents of the request and agreed to postpone the Kolorcity KBSC–Győri ETO FC match to be held in the 5th round of the Fizz League (Nemzeti Bajnokság I).
Source: Kazincbarcikai SC Schedule in MLSZ Adatbank

=== Magyar Kupa ===
13 September 2025 R64	Iváncsa (NB III)	0–1 (a.e.t.)	Kazincbarcika	Iváncsa
15:00 CEST	Aradi (yellow card) 42'; Ivády (yellow card) 57'; Aristotelis (yellow card) 111'	Report	Haroyan (yellow card) 30'; Eleke 98'	Stadium: Károlyi István Sporttelep; Referee: Márk Szigetvári; Assistant referees: Viktor Nagy, Dominik Dobos
Note: • Kazincbarcika: Gyollai — Polgár, Haroyan (Szőke (substituted on) 46'), Rasheed, Sós — Meskhi (Makrai (substituted on) 74'), Berecz (Schuszter (substituted on) 64'), Kártik — Balázsi (Baranyai (substituted on) 46'), Könyves (Deutsch (substituted on) 120'), Šlogar (Eleke (substituted on) 64') • Manager: Kuttor

29 October 2025 R32	Kelen (MB I)	0–1	Kazincbarcika	Budapest
12:30 CET	Meszlényi (yellow card) 24'; Kádár (yellow card) 30'; Benkő (yellow card) 51'; Czerula (yellow card) 56'	Report	Gyollai (yellow card) 8'; Eleke 85'; Sós (yellow card) 90+3'	Stadium: Kelen SC Sporttelep; Referee: Árpád Jakab; Assistant referees: József Aradi, Dániel Sinkovicz
Note: • Kazincbarcika: Gyollai — Szőke, L. Rácz, Meskhi (Rasheed (substituted on) 5'), Deutsch — Schuszter, Kártik (Könyves (substituted on) 66'), Major (Meshack (substituted on) 46') — Šlogar (Sós (substituted on) 78'), Eleke, Makrai (Berecz (substituted on) 46') • Manager: Kuttor

11 February 2026 R16	Ajka (NB II)	0–1	Kazincbarcika	Ajka
16:30 CET	Csörnyei (yellow card) 43'; Cipf (yellow card) 49'; N. Nagy (yellow card) 61'	Report	Kártik 34' (pen.); Meskhi (yellow card) 77'; Baranyai (yellow card) 86'	Stadium: Városi Sportcentrum; Attendance: 400; Referee: Péter Antal; Assistant referees: Péter Garai, István Szécsényi
Note: • Kazincbarcika: Juhász — Baranyai, Radkowski, Zs. Nagy, Ferenczi — Szőke (Meskhi (substituted on) 70'), Berecz — Kártik (c), Smajlagić, Šlogar — Klausz • Manager: Kuttor

4 March 2026 QF	Kazincbarcika	0–5	Ferencváros (NB I)	Miskolc
20:00 CET		Report	Yusuf 21', 41'; Gómez 25'; Joseph 30'; Cadu 45'; Rommens (yellow card) 76'	Stadium: Diósgyőri Stadion; Attendance: 1,164; Referee: Imre Kovács; Assistant referees: Balázs Szert, István Szécsényi
Note: • Kazincbarcika: Juhász — Baranyai, Radkowski, Zs. Nagy, Ferenczi — Szőke (Meskhi (substituted on) 46'), Berecz (Nyíri (substituted on) 46'), Kártik (c) — Könyves (Meshack (substituted on) 46'), Smajlagić (Pukhtyeyev (substituted on) 81') • Manager: Kuttor
