= List of Kazincbarcikai SC seasons =

Kazincbarcikai Sport Club is a professional Hungarian football club based in Kazincbarcika, Hungary.

== Key ==
Nemzeti Bajnokság I

- Pld = Matches played
- W = Matches won
- D = Matches drawn
- L = Matches lost
- GF = Goals for
- GA = Goals against
- Pts = Points
- Pos = Final position

Hungarian football league system

- NB I = Nemzeti Bajnokság I
- NB II = Nemzeti Bajnokság II
- NB III = Nemzeti Bajnokság III
- MB I = Megyei Bajnokság I

Magyar Kupa

- F = Final
- SF = Semi-finals
- QF = Quarter-finals
- R16 = Round of 16
- R32 = Round of 32
- R64 = Round of 64
- R128 = Round of 128

UEFA

- F = Final
- SF = Semi-finals
- QF = Quarter-finals
- Group = Group stage
- PO = Play-offs
- QR3 = Third qualifying round
- QR2 = Second qualifying round
- QR1 = First qualifying round
- PR = Preliminary round

Winners	Runners-up	Third	Promoted	Relegated

Notes

- Note 1: The 2019–20 Nemzeti Bajnokság II was suspended due to the COVID-19 pandemic.

== Seasons ==
As of 13 September 2025.

Season		League									Cup	UEFA		Manager	Ref.
Season	Tier	Div.	Pld	W	D	L	GF	GA	Pts.	Pos.	Cup	Competition	Result	Manager	Ref.
2017–18	2	NBII	38	12	8	18	39	56	44	17th		Did not qualify			
2018–19	2	NBII	38	16	8	14	59	50	56	9th		Did not qualify			
2019–20^{1}	2	NBII	27	8	9	10	33	38	33	14th		Did not qualify			
2020–21	2	NBII ↓	38	8	9	21	32	61	33	18th		Did not qualify			
2021–22	3	NB III ↑	38	32	5	1	106	24	101	1st		Did not qualify			
2022–23	2	NB II	38	12	9	17	41	56	45	14th		Did not qualify			
2023–24	2	NB II	34	11	11	12	37	41	44	10th	R32	Did not qualify		(Hungary) Csábi	
2024–25	2	NB II ↑	30	11	5	13	51	30	21	2nd	R64	Did not qualify		(Hungary) Erős	
2025–26	1	NB I ↓	33	6	4	23	31	70	22	12th	R64	Did not qualify		(Hungary) Kuttor	
2026–27	2	NBII										Did not qualify			

Notes

- Note 1: The 2019–20 Nemzeti Bajnokság II was suspended due to the COVID-19 pandemic.
