= Marcell Major =

Hungarian footballer (born 2005)

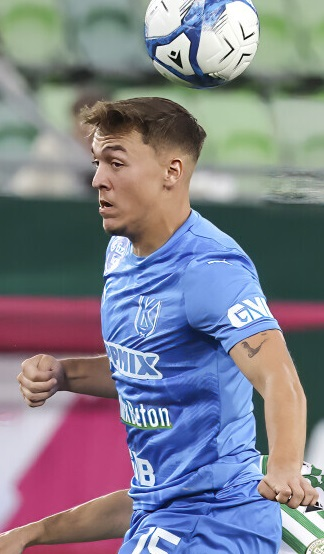
- Major playing for Kazincbarcika in 2025

Personal information
- Date of birth: 17 March 2005 (age 21)
- Place of birth: Fehérgyarmat, Hungary
- Height: 1.78 m (5 ft 10 in)
- Position: Midfielder

Team information
- Current team: Kazincbarcika (on loan from Puskás Akadémia)
- Number: 15

Youth career
- 2012–2016: Nyíregyházi Sportcentrum
- 2016: Filo
- 2016–2017: Nyíregyházi Sportcentrum
- 2017–2019: Nyíregyháza
- 2019–2022: Puskás Akadémia

Senior career*
| Years | Team | Apps | (Gls) |
| 2022– | Puskás Akadémia | 2 | (0) |
| 2022– | Puskás Akadémia II | 13 | (1) |
| 2023 | → Nyíregyháza (loan) | 5 | (0) |
| 2023 | → Nyíregyháza II (loan) | 5 | (1) |
| 2023–2025 | → Csákvár (loan) | 39 | (0) |
| 2025– | → Kazincbarcika (loan) | 20 | (1) |

International career^{‡}
| 2021–2022 | Hungary U17 | 3 | (0) |
| 2022 | Hungary U18 | 2 | (0) |
| 2023 | Hungary U19 | 3 | (1) |
- * Club domestic league appearances and goals as of 30 May 2026 ‡ National team caps and goals as of 18 November 2023

Marcell Major (born 17 March 2005) is a Hungarian professional footballer who plays as a midfielder for Nemzeti Bajnokság I club Kazincbarcika, on loan from Puskás Akadémia. He represented Hungary at youth level.

== Career ==
A product of the Puskás Akadémia, Major made his debut for the senior side in Nemzeti Bajnokság I on 7 August 2022, in a 2–0 home win against Újpest.

On 16 January 2023, he signed a half-year loan deal with his former club Nyíregyháza, who plays in the Nemzeti Bajnokság II.

On 23 July 2025, Major joined Nemzeti Bajnokság I club Kazincbarcika on loan.

== Career statistics ==
=== Club ===
As of match played 21 December 2025

Appearances and goals by club, season and competition
| Club | Season | League | | | Magyar Kupa | | Europe | | Other | | Total | |
| Club | Season | Division | Apps | Goals | Apps | Goals | Apps | Goals | Apps | Goals | Apps | Goals |
|---|---|---|---|---|---|---|---|---|---|---|---|---|
| Puskás Akadémia | 2022–23 | Nemzeti Bajnokság I | 2 | 0 | — | | 0 | 0 | — | | 2 | 0 |
| Puskás Akadémia II | 2022–23 | Nemzeti Bajnokság III | 13 | 1 | — | | — | | — | | 13 | 1 |
| Nyíregyháza (loan) | 2022–23 | Nemzeti Bajnokság II | 5 | 0 | — | | — | | 1 (Note: Appearance in Nemzeti Bajnokság II relegation play-offs) | 0 | 6 | 0 |
| Nyíregyháza II (loan) | 2022–23 | Megyei Bajnokság I | 5 | 1 | — | | — | | — | | 5 | 1 |
| Csákvár (loan) | 2023–24 | Nemzeti Bajnokság II | 17 | 0 | 1 | 0 | — | | — | | 18 | 0 |
| Csákvár (loan) | 2024–25 | Nemzeti Bajnokság II | 22 | 0 | 1 | 0 | — | | — | | 23 | 0 |
| Csákvár (loan) | Total | | 39 | 0 | 2 | 0 | — | | — | | 41 | 0 |
| Kazincbarcika (loan) | 2025–26 | Nemzeti Bajnokság I | 12 | 0 | 1 | 0 | — | | — | | 13 | 0 |
| Career total | | | 76 | 2 | 3 | 0 | 0 | 0 | 1 | 0 | 80 | 2 |

=== International ===
Appearances and goals by national team and year
| Team | Year | Total | |
| Team | Year | Apps | Goals |
|---|---|---|---|
| Hungary U17 | 2021 | 1 | 0 |
| Hungary U17 | 2022 | 2 | 0 |
| Hungary U17 | Total | 3 | 0 |
| Hungary U18 | 2022 | 2 | 0 |
| Hungary U19 | 2023 | 3 | 1 |
| Career total | | 8 | 1 |
