= Kacper Radkowski =

Polish footballer

Personal information
- Date of birth: 27 March 2001 (age 25)
- Place of birth: Poland
- Height: 1.94 m (6 ft 4 in)
- Position: Centre-back

Team information
- Current team: Górnik Łęczna

Youth career
- Legia Warsaw
- 2014–2018: UKS Varsovia
- 2018–2019: Zagłębie Sosnowiec

Senior career*
Years	Team	Apps	(Gls)
2019–2021	Zagłębie Sosnowiec	34	(0)
2021–2024	Śląsk Wrocław	0	(0)
2021–2024	Śląsk Wrocław II	25	(0)
2023	→ Bohemians (loan)	34	(1)
2024–2025	Waterford	55	(1)
2026	Kazincbarcika	12	(1)
2026–	Górnik Łęczna	0	(0)

International career
2019	Poland U19	2	(0)
2021	Poland U20	2	(0)
- * Club domestic league appearances and goals as of 30 May 2026

Kacper Radkowski (born 27 March 2001) is a Polish professional footballer who plays as a centre-back for II liga club Górnik Łęczna.

== Career statistics ==
As of match played 24 April 2026

Appearances and goals by club, season and competition
Club	Season	League			National cup (Note: Includes Polish Cup, FAI Cup, Magyar Kupa)		Continental		Other		Total	
Club	Season	Division	Apps	Goals	Apps	Goals	Apps	Goals	Apps	Goals	Apps	Goals
Zagłębie Sosnowiec	2018–19	Ekstraklasa	2	0	0	0	—		—		2	0
Zagłębie Sosnowiec	2019–20	I liga	23	0	1	0	—		—		24	0
Zagłębie Sosnowiec	2020–21	I liga	9	0	1	0	—		—		10	0
Zagłębie Sosnowiec	Total		34	0	2	0	—		—		36	0
Śląsk Wrocław	2021–22	Ekstraklasa	0	0	0	0	0	0	—		0	0
Śląsk Wrocław II	2021–22	II liga	17	0	1	0	—		—		18	0
Śląsk Wrocław II	2022–23	II liga	8	0	1	0	—		—		9	0
Śląsk Wrocław II	Total		25	0	2	0	—		—		27	0
Bohemians (loan)	2023	LOI Premier Division	34	1	4	0	—		0	0	38	1
Waterford	2024	LOI Premier Division	30	0	2	0	—		1 (Note: Appearance(s) in the Munster Senior Cup)	0	33	0
Waterford	2025	LOI Premier Division	25	1	0	0	—		1	0	26	1
Waterford	Total		55	1	2	0	—		1	0	59	1
Kazincbarcika	2025–26	Nemzeti Bajnokság I	12	1	2	0	—		—		14	1
Górnik Łęczna	2026–27	II liga	0	0	0	0	—		—		0	0
Career total			160	3	12	0	0	0	2	0	174	3
