= Bálint Ferencsik =

Hungarian footballer (born 2005)

Personal information
- Full name: Bálint Donát Ferencsik
- Date of birth: 24 September 2005 (age 21)
- Place of birth: Miskolc, Hungary
- Position: Midfielder

Team information
- Current team: Kazincbarcika
- Number: 66

Youth career
- 2012–2017: Tiszaújváros
- 2017–2024: Diósgyőr

Senior career*
Years	Team	Apps	(Gls)
2022–2024	Diósgyőr II	54	(1)
2023–2025	Diósgyőr	4	(0)
2023–2024	→ Kazincbarcika (loan)	8	(0)
2025	→ Békéscsaba (loan)	11	(1)
2025–	Kazincbarcika	6	(0)
- * Club domestic league appearances and goals as of 30 May 2026

Bálint Donát Ferencsik (born 24 September 2005) is a Hungarian professional footballer who plays as a midfielder for Nemzeti Bajnokság I club Kazincbarcika.

== Career ==
On 27 April 2024, Ferencsik made his debut in the Nemzeti Bajnokság I playing for Diósgyőr, coming on as a substitution in a 0–0 draw at home against Kecskemét.

On 5 February 2025, he was loaned to Nemzeti Bajnokság II club Békéscsaba for the remaining of the season.

On 23 July 2025, he signed for newly first-ever promoted Nemzeti Bajnokság I side Kazincbarcika.

== Career statistics ==
As of match played 19 January 2026

Appearances and goals by club, season and competition
Club	Season	League			Magyar Kupa		Total	
Club	Season	Division	Apps	Goals	Apps	Goals	Apps	Goals
Diósgyőr II	2022–23	Nemzeti Bajnokság III	31	1	—		31	1
Diósgyőr II	2023–24	Nemzeti Bajnokság III	17	0	—		17	0
Diósgyőr II	2024–25	Nemzeti Bajnokság III	6	0	—		6	0
Diósgyőr II	Total		54	1	—		54	1
Diósgyőr	2022–23	Nemzeti Bajnokság II	0	0	—		0	0
Diósgyőr	2023–24	Nemzeti Bajnokság I	2	0	—		2	0
Diósgyőr	2024–25	Nemzeti Bajnokság I	2	0	0	0	2	0
Diósgyőr	Total		4	0	0	0	4	0
Kazincbarcika (loan)	2023–24	Nemzeti Bajnokság II	2	0	—		2	0
Kazincbarcika (loan)	2024–25	Nemzeti Bajnokság II	6	0	—		6	0
Kazincbarcika (loan)	Total		8	0	—		8	0
Békéscsaba (loan)	2024–25	Nemzeti Bajnokság II	11	1	—		11	1
Kazincbarcika	2025–26	Nemzeti Bajnokság I	5	0	0	0	5	0
Career total			82	2	0	0	82	2
