= László Deutsch =

Hungarian footballer (born 1999)

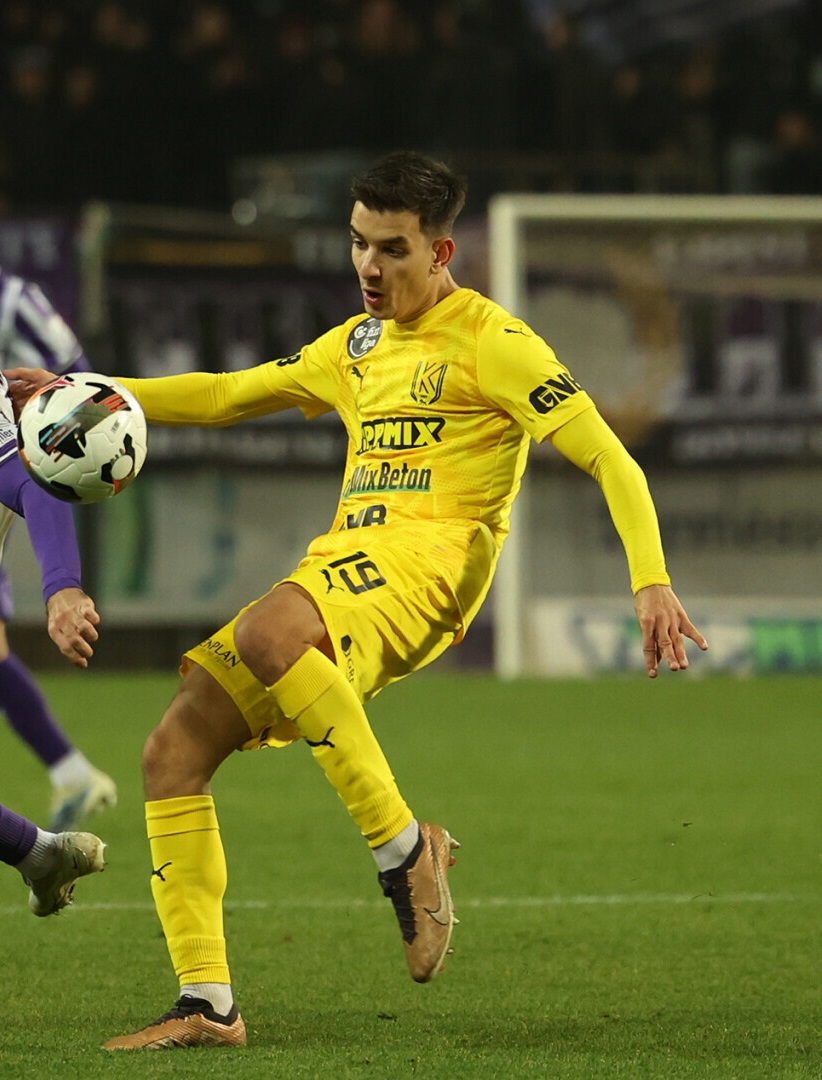
- Deutsch playing for Kazincbarcika in 2025

Personal information
- Date of birth: 9 March 1999 (age 27)
- Place of birth: Budapest, Hungary
- Height: 1.74 m (5 ft 9 in)
- Position: Left back

Team information
- Current team: Kazincbarcika
- Number: 19

Youth career
- 2008–2015: Ferencváros
- 2015–2018: Puskás Akadémia

Senior career*
Years	Team	Apps	(Gls)
2018–2022	Puskás Akadémia	42	(1)
2018–2022	→ Puskás Akadémia II	27	(0)
2018–2020	→ Csákvár (loan)	34	(0)
2022–2025	Vasas	36	(1)
2025–	Kazincbarcika	13	(0)

International career^{‡}
2015	Hungary U-17	3	(1)
2019–2021	Hungary U-21	4	(0)
- * Club domestic league appearances and goals as of 30 May 2026 ‡ National team caps and goals as of 30 March 2021

László Deutsch (born 9 March 1999) is a Hungarian football defender who plays for Nemzeti Bajnokság I club Kazincbarcika.

== Club career ==
On 29 June 2022, Deutsch moved to Vasas.

On 4 September 2025, Deutsch signed with Nemzeti Bajnokság I club Kazincbarcika.

== Career statistics ==
As of 15 May 2021.

Appearances and goals by club, season and competition
Club	Season	League			Cup		Continental		Other		Total	
Club	Season	Division	Apps	Goals	Apps	Goals	Apps	Goals	Apps	Goals	Apps	Goals
Csákvár	2018–19	NB II	18	0	0	0	0	0	—		18	0
Csákvár	2019–20	NB II	16	0	1	0	0	0	—		17	0
Csákvár	Total		34	0	1	0	0	0	0	0	35	0
Puskás Akadémia	2019–20	NB I	11	1	2	0	0	0	—		13	1
Puskás Akadémia	2020–21	NB I	22	0	1	0	1	0	—		24	0
Puskás Akadémia	Total		33	1	3	0	1	0	0	0	37	1
Kazincbarcika	2025–26	NB I	0	0	0	0	0	0	—		0	0
Career total			67	1	4	0	1	0	0	0	72	1
