= Bálint Kártik =

Hungarian footballer (born 1997)

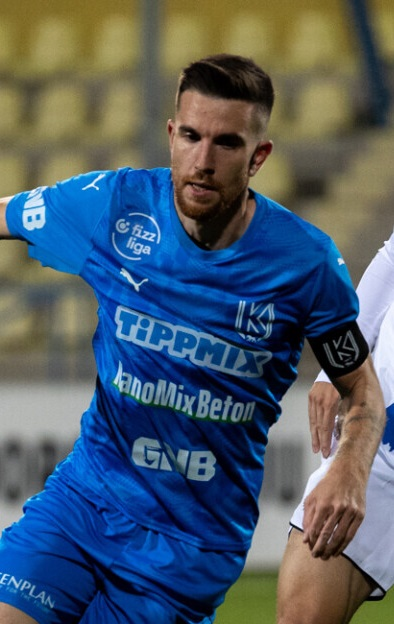
- Kártik playing for Kazincbarcika in 2025

Personal information
- Full name: Bálint József Kártik
- Date of birth: 18 April 1997 (age 29)
- Place of birth: Berettyóújfalu, Hungary
- Height: 1.89 m (6 ft 2 in)
- Position: Midfielder

Team information
- Current team: Kazincbarcika
- Number: 10

Youth career
- 2004–2007: Berettyóújfalu
- 2007–2008: Debreceni Honvéd
- 2008–2009: Létavértes
- 2009–2011: Debreceni Honvéd
- 2010–2011: → Hajdúböszörmény (loan)
- 2011–2016: Debrecen

Senior career*
Years	Team	Apps	(Gls)
2015–2016	Debrecen II	4	(0)
2016–2021	Nyíregyháza	133	(16)
2021–2023	Puskás Akadémia	0	(0)
2021–2023	→ Csákvár (loan)	41	(7)
2023	Pécs	11	(0)
2023–	Kazincbarcika	91	(10)
- * Club domestic league appearances and goals as of 30 May 2026

Bálint József Kártik (born 18 April 1997) is a Hungarian professional footballer who plays as a midfielder for and captains Nemzeti Bajnokság I club Kazincbarcika.

== Career ==
In August 2023, Kártik joined Kazincbarcika and quickly became an integral part of the team. During his first season at the club, he made 32 league appearances in blue and yellow, scoring one goal. Ahead of the 2024–25 season, he was entrusted with the captain's armband and responded with strong performances, scoring three goals in the opening four matches and playing a key role in the team's impressive start to the campaign. On 20 September 2024, Kártik signed a two-year contract extension with Kazincbarcika, committing his future to the club until 2027.

== Personal life ==
He has a daughter, Emília, born in the summer of 2024.

== Career statistics ==
As of match played 21 February 2026

Appearances and goals by club, season and competition
Club	Season	League			Magyar Kupa		Total	
Club	Season	Division	Apps	Goals	Apps	Goals	Apps	Goals
Debrecen II	2015–16	Nemzeti Bajnokság III	4	0	—		4	0
Nyíregyháza	2016–17	Nemzeti Bajnokság II	31	6	1	0	32	6
Nyíregyháza	2017–18	Nemzeti Bajnokság II	31	4	2	1	33	5
Nyíregyháza	2018–19	Nemzeti Bajnokság II	32	3	2	0	34	3
Nyíregyháza	2019–20	Nemzeti Bajnokság II	25	3	2	0	27	3
Nyíregyháza	2020–21	Nemzeti Bajnokság II	14	0	2	2	16	2
Nyíregyháza	Total		133	16	9	3	142	19
Csákvár (loan)	2020–21	Nemzeti Bajnokság II	1	0	—		1	0
Csákvár (loan)	2021–22	Nemzeti Bajnokság II	27	6	1	0	28	6
Csákvár (loan)	2022–23	Nemzeti Bajnokság II	13	1	—		13	1
Csákvár (loan)	Total		41	7	1	0	42	7
Pécs	2022–23	Nemzeti Bajnokság II	10	0	—		10	0
Pécs	2023–24	Nemzeti Bajnokság II	1	0	—		1	0
Pécs	Total		11	0	—		11	0
Kazincbarcika	2023–24	Nemzeti Bajnokság II	32	1	2	1	34	2
Kazincbarcika	2024–25	Nemzeti Bajnokság II	27	5	1	0	28	5
Kazincbarcika	2025–26	Nemzeti Bajnokság I	23	3	3	1	26	4
Kazincbarcika	Total		82	9	6	2	88	11
Career total			271	32	16	5	287	37
