= Norbert Könyves =

Hungarian footballer (born 1989)

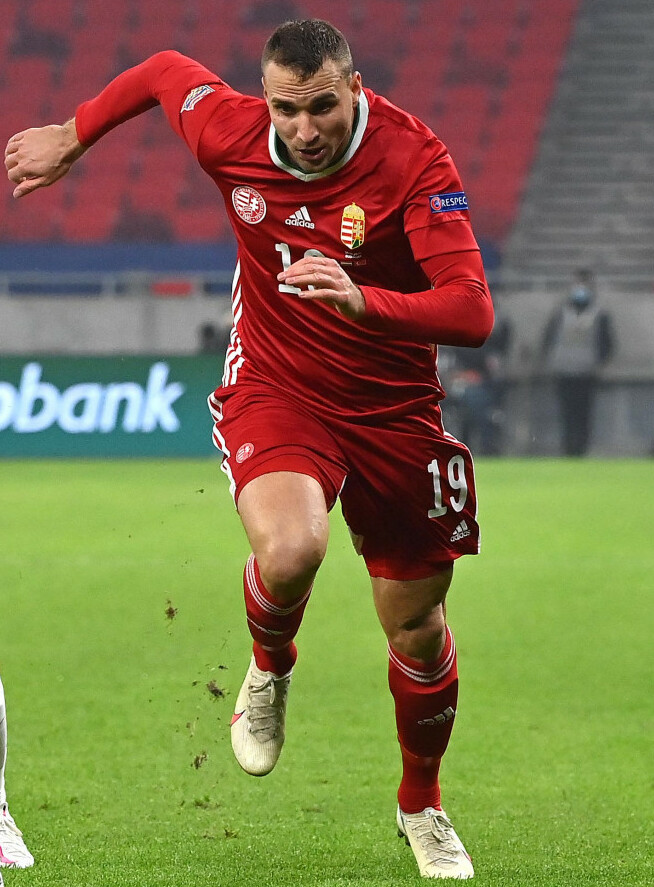
- Könyves in 2020

Personal information
- Date of birth: 10 June 1989 (age 37)
- Place of birth: Senta, SR Serbia, SFR Yugoslavia
- Height: 1.85 m (6 ft 1 in)
- Positions: Winger; forward

Team information
- Current team: Kazincbarcika
- Number: 42

Youth career
- 2005–2008: Bačka Topola

Senior career*
Years	Team	Apps	(Gls)
2007–2008	Bačka Topola		
2008–2013	MTK	92	(18)
2013–2015	Paks	57	(16)
2015–2016	Vasas	20	(3)
2016–2019	Debrecen	56	(14)
2019–2020	Paks	41	(13)
2020–2021	Zalaegerszeg	24	(6)
2021–2023	Diósgyőr	48	(17)
2023–2024	Paks	28	(11)
2024	Vasas	7	(1)
2025	Paks	11	(3)
2025–	Kazincbarcika	29	(2)

International career
2020	Hungary	5	(1)
- * Club domestic league appearances and goals as of 30 May 2026

Norbert Könyves (Serbian Cyrillic: Норберт Кењвеш / Norbert Kenjveš; born 10 June 1989) is a Hungarian professional footballer who plays as a winger or forward for Kazincbarcikai SC.

Born in Senta, SR Serbia, SFR Yugoslavia, Könyves grew up in Mol, where his family comes from.

== Club career ==
=== Debrecen ===
On 3 April 2018, he scored a hat-trick against Budapest Honvéd in the quarter-finals of the 2017–18 Magyar Kupa at the Nagyerdei Stadion, Debrecen, Hungary.

=== Paks ===
On 15 May 2024, he won the 2024 Magyar Kupa Final with Paks by beating Ferencváros 2–0 at the Puskás Aréna.

=== Kazincbarcika ===
On 14 July 2025, Könyves signed to Nemzeti Bajnokság I club Kazincbarcikai SC.

== International career ==
He made his national team debut on 11 October 2020 in a Nations League game against Serbia and scored the only goal of the game in a 1–0 away win. He earned all of his 5 caps during that 6-weeks Nations League window.

== Career statistics ==
=== Club ===
As of 1 June 2021

Appearances and goals by club, season and competition
Club	Season	League		National cup		League cup		Europe		Total	
Club	Season	Apps	Goals	Apps	Goals	Apps	Goals	Apps	Goals	Apps	Goals
MTK Budapest	2008–09	11	0	1	1	1	1	–	–	13	2
MTK Budapest	2009–10	25	5	5	4	5	1	–	–	35	10
MTK Budapest	2010–11	25	5	5	1	1	0	–	–	31	6
MTK Budapest	2011–12	18	5	9	6	6	2	–	–	33	13
MTK Budapest	2012–13	13	3	1	0	2	0	1	0	17	3
MTK Budapest	Total	92	18	21	12	15	4	1	0	129	34
Paks	2012–13	11	1	0	0	–	–	–	–	11	1
Paks	2013–14	20	5	0	0	5	1	–	–	25	6
Paks	2014–15	23	10	0	0	2	0	–	–	25	10
Paks	2015–16	3	0	0	0	–	–	–	–	3	0
Paks	2018–19	13	2	2	0	–	–	–	–	15	2
Paks	2019–20	28	11	6	1	–	–	–	–	34	12
Paks	Total	98	29	8	1	7	1	0	0	113	31
Vasas	2015–16	19	3	1	0	–	–	–	–	20	3
Vasas	2016–17	1	0	0	0	–	–	–	–	1	0
Vasas	2024–25	0	0	0	0	–	–	–	–	0	0
Total	20	3	1	0	0	0	0	0	21	3	
Debrecen	2016–17	17	4	1	0	–	–	–	–	18	4
Debrecen	2017–18	28	8	3	2	–	–	–	–	31	10
Debrecen	2018–19	11	2	1	1	–	–	–	–	12	3
Debrecen	Total	56	14	5	3	0	0	0	0	61	17
Zalaegerszeg	2020–21	24	6	0	0	–	–	–	–	24	6
Diósgyőr	2021–22	0	0	0	0	–	–	–	–	0	0
Kazincbarcika	2025–26	0	0	0	0	–	–	–	–	0	0
Career total		293	70	35	16	22	5	1	0	348	91

=== International ===
As of 11 October 2020

Hungary score listed first, score column indicates score after each Könyves goal.

International goals by date, venue, cap, opponent, score, result and competition
No.	Date	Venue	Cap	Opponent	Score	Result	Competition
1	11 October 2020	Rajko Mitić Stadium, Belgrade, Serbia	1	Serbia	1–0	1–0	2020-21 UEFA Nations League B
