= Gábor Makrai =

Hungarian footballer (born 1996)

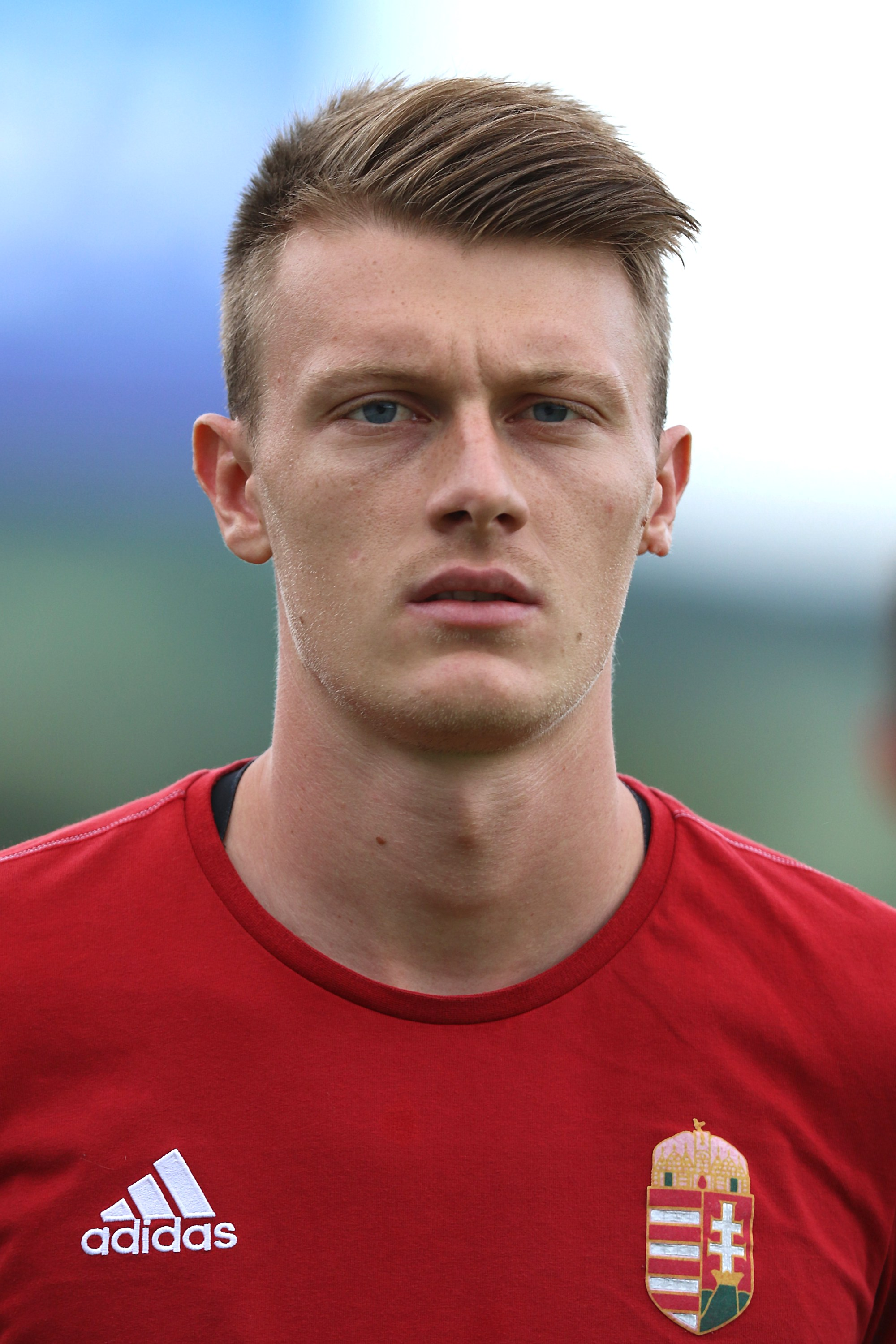

Personal information
- Date of birth: 26 June 1996 (age 30)
- Place of birth: Eger, Hungary
- Height: 1.86 m (6 ft 1 in)
- Position: Forward

Team information
- Current team: Ajka (on loan from Kazincbarcika)
- Number: 7

Youth career
- 2005–2010: Kazincbarcika
- 2010–2011: Puskás Akadémia
- 2011–2013: Videoton
- 2013–2014: Puskás Akadémia

Senior career*
Years	Team	Apps	(Gls)
2014–2017	Puskás Akadémia	13	(0)
2015–2016	→ Csákvár (loan)	24	(15)
2016–2017	→ Diósgyőr (loan)	19	(4)
2017–2022	Diósgyőr	37	(4)
2022	→ Csákvár (loan)	14	(3)
2022–2023	Pécs	5	(0)
2022–2023	→ Siófok (loan)	7	(0)
2023–2025	FK Csíkszereda	40	(4)
2025–	Kazincbarcika	19	(2)
2026–	→ Ajka (loan)	5	(1)

International career
2014–2017	Hungary U20	2	(0)
2016–2018	Hungary U21	12	(3)
- * Club domestic league appearances and goals as of 31 May 2026

Gábor Makrai (born 26 June 1996) is a Hungarian professional footballer who plays as a forward for Nemzeti Bajnokság II club Ajka on loan from Kazincbarcika.
