= Attila Szujó =

Hungarian footballer (born 2003)

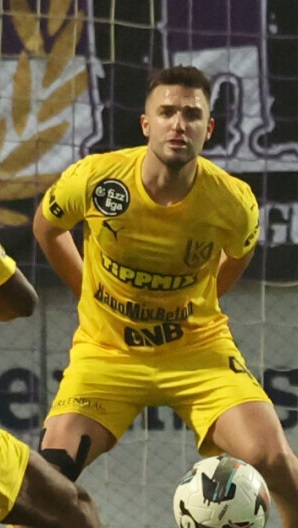
- Szujó playing for Kazincbarcika in 2025

Personal information
- Date of birth: 14 September 2003 (age 23)
- Place of birth: Kecskemét, Hungary
- Height: 1.82 m (6 ft 0 in)
- Position: Centre-back

Team information
- Current team: Kazincbarcika
- Number: 44

Youth career
- 2014–2015: Kecskemét
- 2015–2021: Puskás Akadémia

Senior career*
| Years | Team | Apps | (Gls) |
| 2021–2022 | Debrecen | 2 | (0) |
| 2021–2022 | → Debrecen II | 19 | (0) |
| 2022–2024 | Győr | 23 | (0) |
| 2024– | Kazincbarcika | 8 | (0) |

International career^{‡}
| 2018 | Hungary U-15 | 3 | (0) |
| 2019 | Hungary U-16 | 4 | (1) |
| 2020–2021 | Hungary U-17 | 9 | (0) |
| 2021– | Hungary U-19 | 10 | (0) |
- * Club domestic league appearances and goals as of 19 January 2026 ‡ National team caps and goals as of 29 March 2022

Attila Szujó (born 14 September 2003) is a Hungarian professional footballer who plays as a defender for Nemzeti Bajnokság I club Kazincbarcika.

== Club career ==
On 7 July 2022, Szujó signed a three-year contract with Győr.

== Career statistics ==
As of 15 May 2022

Appearances and goals by club, season and competition
| Club | Season | League | | | Cup | | Continental | | Other | | Total | |
| Club | Season | Division | Apps | Goals | Apps | Goals | Apps | Goals | Apps | Goals | Apps | Goals |
|---|---|---|---|---|---|---|---|---|---|---|---|---|
| Debrecen II | 2021–22 | Nemzeti Bajnokság III | 19 | 0 | 0 | 0 | 0 | 0 | — | | 19 | 0 |
| Debrecen II | Total | | 19 | 0 | 0 | 0 | 0 | 0 | 0 | 0 | 19 | 0 |
| Debrecen | 2021–22 | Nemzeti Bajnokság I | 2 | 0 | 0 | 0 | 0 | 0 | — | | 2 | 0 |
| Debrecen | Total | | 2 | 0 | 0 | 0 | 0 | 0 | 0 | 0 | 2 | 0 |
| Career total | | | 21 | 0 | 0 | 0 | 0 | 0 | 0 | 0 | 21 | 0 |
