= Semir Smajlagić =

Bosnia and Herzegovina footballer

Personal information
- Date of birth: 18 September 1998 (age 28)
- Place of birth: Zenica, Bosnia and Herzegovina
- Height: 1.91 m (6 ft 3 in)
- Position: Forward

Team information
- Current team: Kazincbarcika
- Number: 9

Youth career
- Sarajevo

Senior career*
Years	Team	Apps	(Gls)
2016–2018	Sarajevo	0	(0)
2018–2021	Gorica	50	(9)
2019	→ Mladost Kakanj (loan)	16	(0)
2020	→ Sloboda Tuzla (loan)	18	(2)
2021–2022	Astana	11	(0)
2021	→ Kyzylzhar (loan)	8	(0)
2022	Nasaf	8	(0)
2022	Tuzla City	11	(5)
2023	JS Kabylie	3	(0)
2024	Radnički Niš	7	(1)
2024–2025	Primorje	18	(7)
2025	Chungnam Asan	0	(0)
2025	Hamrun Spartans	9	(2)
2026–	Kazincbarcika	8	(0)

International career
2016–2017	Bosnia and Herzegovina U19	5	(1)
- * Club domestic league appearances and goals as of 30 May 2026

Semir Smajlagić (born 18 September 1998) is a Bosnian footballer who plays as a forward for Hungarian Nemzeti Bajnokság I club Kazincbarcika.

== Career ==
=== Club career ===
Before the second half of 2017/18, Smajlagić signed for Slovenian side Gorica (Slovenia) after almost signing for St. Gallen in Switzerland and playing for the youth academy of FK Sarajevo, Bosnia and Herzegovina's most successful club, where he received interest from Italy.

In 2019, Smajlagić was sent on loan to Mladost in Bosnia and Herzegovina, where he made 16 league appearances without scoring.

Before the 2021 season, he signed for Astana, Kazakhstan's most successful team. On 2 January 2022, Astana announced that Smajlagić had left the club by mutual consent. In 2023, he joined JS Kabylie.

On 8 January 2026, Smajlagić signed for Hungarian side Kazincbarcikai SC.
