= Gergő Szőke =

Hungarian footballer (born 2003)

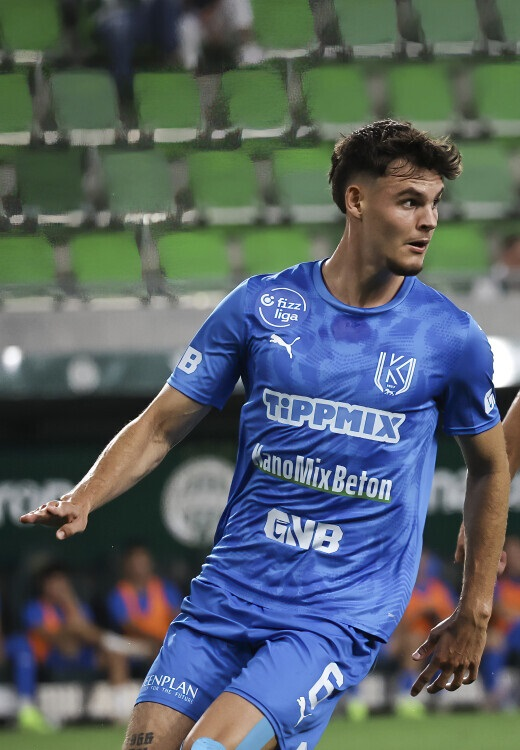
- Szőke playing for Kazincbarcika in 2025

Personal information
- Date of birth: 26 December 2003 (age 22)
- Place of birth: Budapest, Hungary
- Height: 1.87 m (6 ft 2 in)
- Position: Midfielder

Team information
- Current team: Kazincbarcika
- Number: 6

Youth career
- 2009–2011: Magyar AC
- 2011–2014: Mészöly Focisuli
- 2014–2022: MTK

Senior career*
Years	Team	Apps	(Gls)
2021–2025	MTK II	52	(2)
2023–2025	MTK	5	(0)
2023–2024	→ Gyirmót (loan)	28	(0)
2023–2024	→ Gyirmót II (loan)	3	(2)
2025–	Kazincbarcika	25	(1)
- * Club domestic league appearances and goals as of 30 May 2026

Gergő Szőke (born 26 December 2003) is a Hungarian professional footballer who plays as a midfielder for Nemzeti Bajnokság I club Kazincbarcika.

== Career ==
Born in Budapest, Szőke began playing football at Magyar AC and later at the Mészöly Focisuli, before joining MTK at the age of eleven, where he progressed through all youth levels. He made his senior debut for MTK in Nemzeti Bajnokság II on 23 May 2023, then spent the following season on loan at Gyirmót, appearing in 28 matches, including 19 as a starter. After returning to his parent club, he featured four times in Nemzeti Bajnokság I and played 21 matches for MTK's second team. His development led to a transfer on 4 July 2025 to Nemzeti Bajnokság I side Kazincbarcika, where the 21‑year‑old midfielder continued his professional career.

== Career statistics ==
As of match played 1 March 2026

Appearances and goals by club, season and competition
Club	Season	League			Magyar Kupa		Total	
Club	Season	Division	Apps	Goals	Apps	Goals	Apps	Goals
MTK	2021–22	Nemzeti Bajnokság III	2	0	—		2	0
MTK	2022–23	Nemzeti Bajnokság III	29	1	—		29	1
MTK	2024–25	Nemzeti Bajnokság III	21	1	—		21	1
MTK	Total		52	2	—		52	2
MTK	2022–23	Nemzeti Bajnokság II	1	0	—		1	0
MTK	2024–25	Nemzeti Bajnokság I	4	0	1	0	5	0
MTK	Total		5	0	1	0	6	0
Gyirmót (loan)	2023–24	Nemzeti Bajnokság II	28	0	2	0	30	0
Gyirmót II (loan)	2023–24	Nemzeti Bajnokság III	3	2	—		3	2
Kazincbarcika	2025–26	Nemzeti Bajnokság I	17	0	3	0	20	0
Career total			105	4	6	0	111	4
