= Dániel Gyollai =

Hungarian footballer (born 1997)

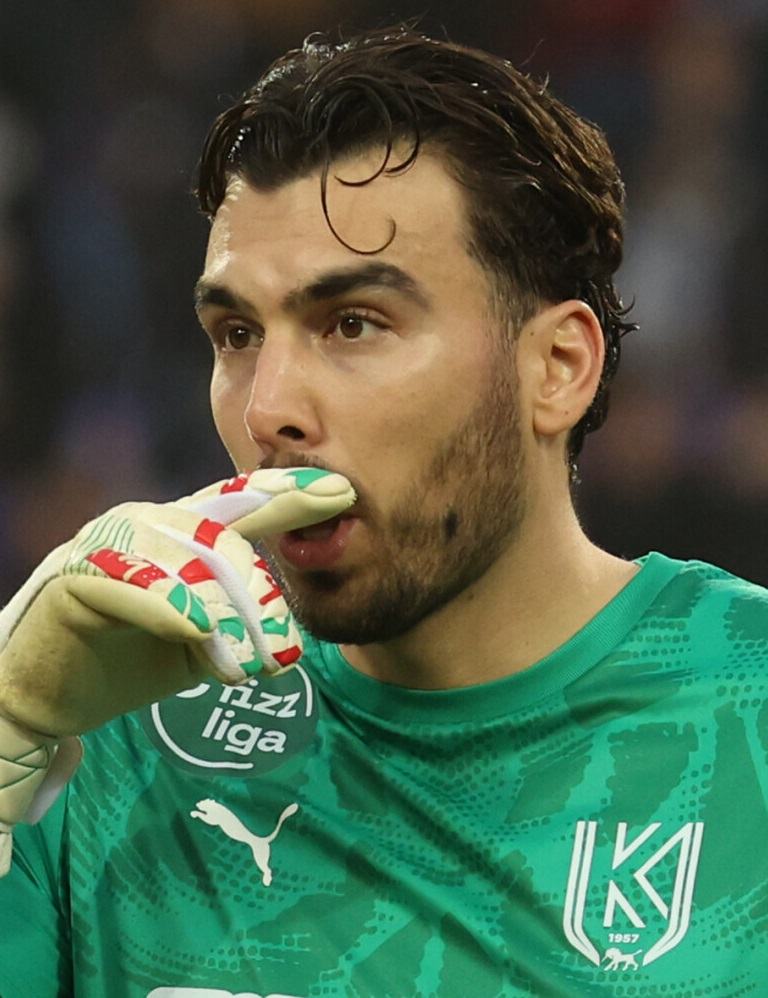
- Gyollai playing for Kazincbarcika in 2025

Personal information
- Full name: Dániel Gyollai
- Date of birth: 7 April 1997 (age 29)
- Place of birth: Békéscsaba, Hungary
- Height: 1.93 m (6 ft 4 in)
- Position: Goalkeeper

Team information
- Current team: Kazincbarcika
- Number: 1

Youth career
- 2005–2011: Békéscsaba 1912 Előre
- 2011–2013: Budapest Honvéd
- 2013–2016: Stoke City

Senior career*
Years	Team	Apps	(Gls)
2016–2019	Stoke City	0	(0)
2016	→ Nantwich Town (loan)	8	(0)
2017	→ Nantwich Town (loan)		
2019–2020	Wigan Athletic	0	(0)
2020–2022	Peterborough United	0	(0)
2021–2022	→ Maidenhead United (loan)	2	(0)
2022–2023	Maidenhead United	39	(0)
2024–2025	Glentoran	38	(1)
2025–	Kazincbarcika	16	(0)

International career
- Hungary U17
2015	Hungary U18	1	(0)
2015–2016	Hungary U19	1	(0)
2017–2018	Hungary U21	1	(0)
- * Club domestic league appearances and goals as of 30 May 2026

Dániel Gyollai (born 7 April 1997) is a Hungarian professional footballer who plays as a goalkeeper for Kazincbarcika. He has represented Hungary at various youth levels.

== Career ==
Gyollai was born in Békéscsaba and started his youth career at hometown club Békéscsaba 1912 Előre in 2005. He left the club in 2011 to join the youth academy of Nemzeti Bajnokság I club Budapest Honvéd.

In 2013, he graduated from the Hungarian Football Academy and signed for English Premier League club Stoke City. Originally placed into the under-18 squad, Gyollai was moved to the under-21 squad in 2015 and was a regular name on the teamsheet in Premier League 2 and EFL Trophy matches.

After various senior games as an unused substitute for Stoke, in 2016, Gyollai joined Nantwich Town on loan. He went on to make 8 league appearances for the club. Impressing on his loan spell, in 2017, Gyollai re-joined The Dabbers once again on loan.

At the end of the 2018–19 season, Gyollai was released by Stoke City and on 1 August 2019 joined Championship side Wigan Athletic, penning a one-year deal.

On 30 July 2020, Gyollai signed for League One club Peterborough United on a two-year deal. He made his debut for the club on 8 September 2020, starting in a 3–3 draw at home to Burton Albion in the EFL Trophy, which The Posh won 5–4 on penalties.

On 11 May 2021, he was made available for transfer by Peterborough. He moved on loan to Maidenhead United in December 2021. After two league appearances, the transfer was made permanent in January 2022. He won the Supporters' Player of the Season award for the 2021–22 season. In the 2022–23 season Gyollai sustained anterior cruciate ligament and medial collateral ligament injuries in February 2023, which kept him out for the rest of the campaign. He was released in June 2023.

On 15 June 2024, Gyollai signed for Northern Irish side Glentoran. In December 2024 he scored a "freak goal" from a free kick in his own half.

On 26 June 2025, Gyollai signed for Hungarian club Kazincbarcika.

== Career statistics ==
As of 7 February 2023

Appearances and goals by club, season and competition
Club	Season	League			National Cup		League Cup		Other		Total	
Club	Season	Division	Apps	Goals	Apps	Goals	Apps	Goals	Apps	Goals	Apps	Goals
Stoke City U21	2017–18	–							1 (Note: Appearance(s) in EFL Trophy)	0	1	0
Stoke City U21	2018–19	–							2	0	2	0
Stoke City U21	Total		0	0	0	0	0	0	3	0	3	0
Nantwich Town (loan)	2015–16	NPL Premier Division	No data currently available									
Nantwich Town (loan)	2016–17	NPL Premier Division	No data currently available									
Peterborough United	2020–21	League One	0	0	0	0	0	0	4	0	4	0
Peterborough United	2021–22	Championship	0	0	0	0	0	0	0	0	0	0
Peterborough United	Total		0	0	0	0	0	0	4	0	4	0
Maidenhead United (loan)	2021–22	National League	2	0	0	0	0	0	0	0	2	0
Maidenhead United	2021–22	National League	14	0	0	0	0	0	0	0	14	0
Maidenhead United	2022–23	National League	25	0	1	0	0	0	0	0	26	0
Maidenhead United	Total		41	0	1	0	0	0	0	0	41	0
Career total			41	0	1	0	0	0	7	0	49	0

== Honours ==
Glentoran

- County Antrim Shield: 2024–25
