= Meshack Ubochioma =

Nigerian footballer (born 2001)

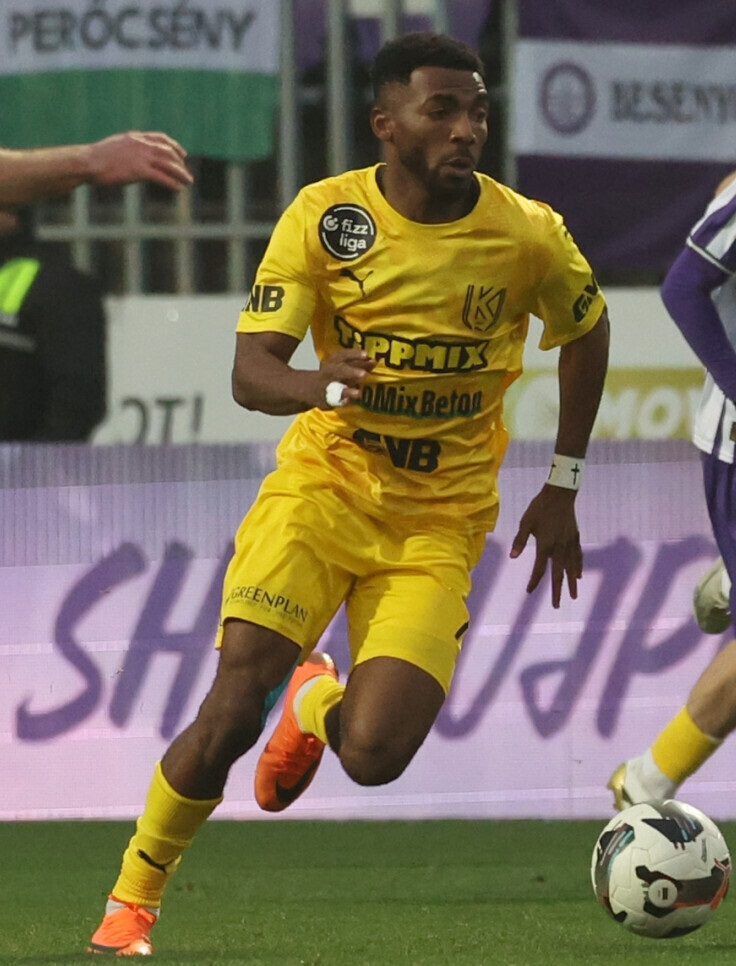
- Ubochioma playing for Kazincbarcika in 2025

Personal information
- Full name: Meshack Izuchukwu Ubochioma
- Date of birth: 29 November 2001 (age 24)
- Place of birth: Imo, Nigeria
- Height: 1.75 m (5 ft 9 in)
- Position: Winger

Team information
- Current team: Qabala
- Number: 80

Senior career*
Years	Team	Apps	(Gls)
2020–2021	Nafta	18	(12)
2021–2024	ZTE	79	(9)
2024–2025	Dundee United	2	(1)
2025	→ Livingston (loan)	4	(0)
2025–2026	Kazincbarcika	28	(4)
2026–	Qabala	11	(0)
- * Club domestic league appearances and goals as of 13 November 2026

Meshack Izuchukwu Ubochioma (born 29 November 2001) is a Nigerian footballer who plays as a winger for Azerbaijan Premier League club Qabala.

== Early life ==
Ubochioma was born in 2001 in Nigeria. He started playing football at the age of five.

== Career ==
In 2021, Ubiochioma signed for Hungarian side ZTE. He helped the club win the 2023 Magyar Kupa.

On 3 August 2024, Scottish Premiership club Dundee United announced the signing of Ubochioma to a two-year contract. In January 2025, Ubochioma was loaned to Scottish Championship club Livingston for the remainder of the 2024–25 season. Upon returning to Dundee United at the end of the season, Ubochioma was released from this contract.

On 8 August 2025, he signed with Nemzeti Bajnokság I club Kazincbarcika.

On 21 July 2026, Azerbaijan Premier League club Qabala announced the signing of Ubochioma from Kazincbarcikai, to a one-year contract with the option of an additional year.

== Personal life ==
Ubochioma has a brother. He is a native of Imo State, Nigeria.

== Career statistics ==
As of match played on 7 November 2026

Appearances and goals by club, season and competition
Club	Season	League			National cup		League cup		Continental		Other		Total	
Club	Season	Division	Apps	Goals	Apps	Goals	Apps	Goals	Apps	Goals	Apps	Goals	Apps	Goals
Dundee United	2024–25	Scottish Premiership	2	1	0	0	1	0	—		—		3	1
Livingston (loan)	2024–25	Scottish Championship	4	0	2	0	0	0	—		0	0	6	0
Kazincbarcika	2025–26	Nemzeti Bajnokság I	28	4	2	0	—		—		—		30	4
Qabala	2026–27	Azerbaijan Premier League	11	0	1	0	—		—		—		12	0
Career total			45	5	5	0	1	0	-	-	0	0	51	5

== Honours ==
Zalaegerszeg

- Magyar Kupa: 2022–23
