= 2024–25 County Antrim Shield =

Tournament details
- Country: Northern Ireland
- Teams: 16

Final positions
- Champions: Glentoran (27th title)
- Runners-up: Larne

Tournament statistics
- Matches played: 15
- Goals scored: 35 (2.33 per match)

The 2024–25 County Antrim Shield was the 136th edition of the County Antrim Shield, a cup competition in Northern Irish football.

Glentoran won the tournament for the 27th time, defeating Larne 4–3 on penalties after a 1–1 draw in the final.

== Results ==
=== First round ===
Team 1	Score	Team 2
Ballyclare Comrades	2–3	Linfield
Ballymena United	2–1	Ballymacash Rangers
Bangor	0–4	Carrick Rangers
Cliftonville	0–0 (9–8 p)	Ards
Crusaders	6–2	Knockbreda
Harland & Wolff Welders	2–2 (4–5 p)	Glentoran
Larne	3–0	Queen's University
Newington	4–1	Dundela

=== Quarter-finals ===
Team 1	Score	Team 2
Cliftonville	0–1	Ballymena United
Crusaders	3–2	Linfield
Glentoran	2–0	Carrick Rangers
Larne	4–0	Newington

=== Semi-finals ===
Team 1	Score	Team 2
Glentoran	2–0	Ballymena United
Larne	2–0	Crusaders

=== Final ===
21 January 2025

Glentoran	1–1	Larne
Lindsay 80'	Report	Ryan 86'
Penalties
Jenkins (penalty scored); Lindsay (penalty scored); Palmer (penalty scored); Aouachria (penalty scored); Pattisson (penalty scored)	5–4	(penalty scored) Ryan; (penalty scored) Thomson; (penalty scored) Gallagher; (penalty missed) Ives; (penalty scored) Cosgrove

Seaview, Belfast
