= Bence Sós =

Hungarian footballer (born 1994)

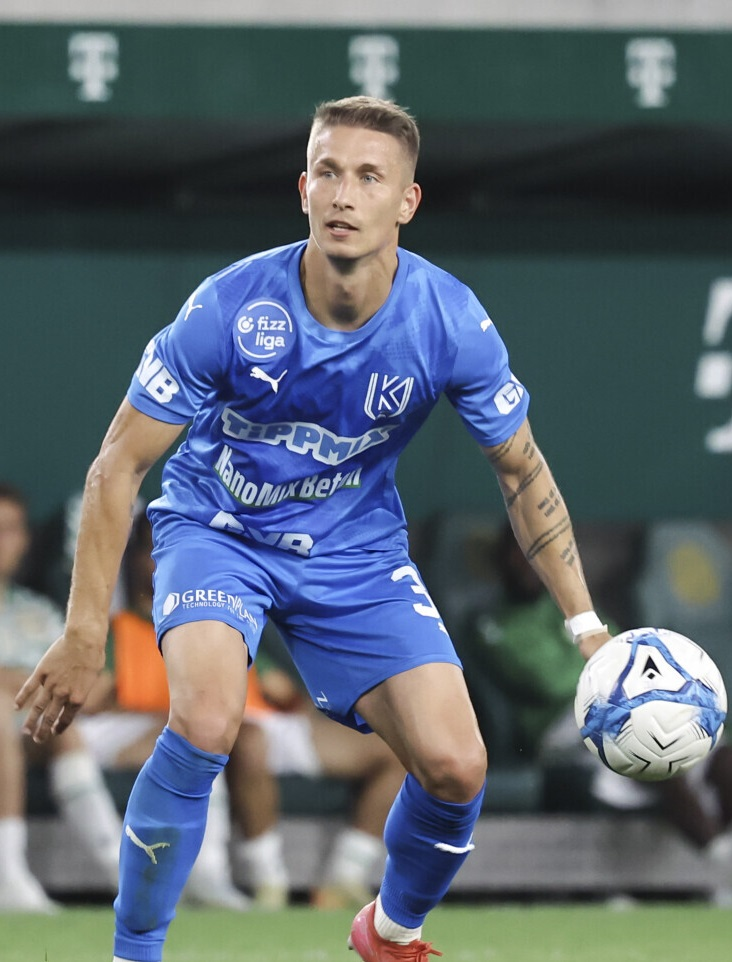
- Sós playing for Kazincbarcika in 2025

Personal information
- Date of birth: 10 May 1994 (age 32)
- Place of birth: Hódmezővásárhely, Hungary
- Height: 1.78 m (5 ft 10 in)
- Position: Midfielder

Team information
- Current team: Tiszakécske
- Number: 38

Youth career
- 2005–2011: Hódmezővásárhely
- 2011–2012: Debrecen

Senior career*
Years	Team	Apps	(Gls)
2009–2011	Hódmezővásárhely	8	(1)
2012–2018	Debrecen	24	(4)
2012–2015	→ Debrecen II	38	(18)
2013–2014	→ Létavértes (loan)	24	(8)
2016–2017	→ Mezőkövesd (loan)	35	(3)
2018–2019	Fehérvár	5	(0)
2019	→ Puskás Akadémia (loan)	11	(0)
2019–2020	Puskás Akadémia	28	(1)
2020–2023	Debrecen	76	(10)
2023–2026	TSC	47	(3)
2025	→ Kazincbarcika (loan)	14	(2)
2026–	Tiszakécske	9	(0)
- * Club domestic league appearances and goals as of 31 May 2026

Bence Sós (born 10 May 1994) is a Hungarian professional footballer who plays for Tiszakécske.

== Career ==
On 31 May 2015, Sós played his first match for Debrecen in a 5–0 win against Győr in the Hungarian League.
