= Kolorcity Aréna =

Sports stadium in Kazincbarcika, Hungary

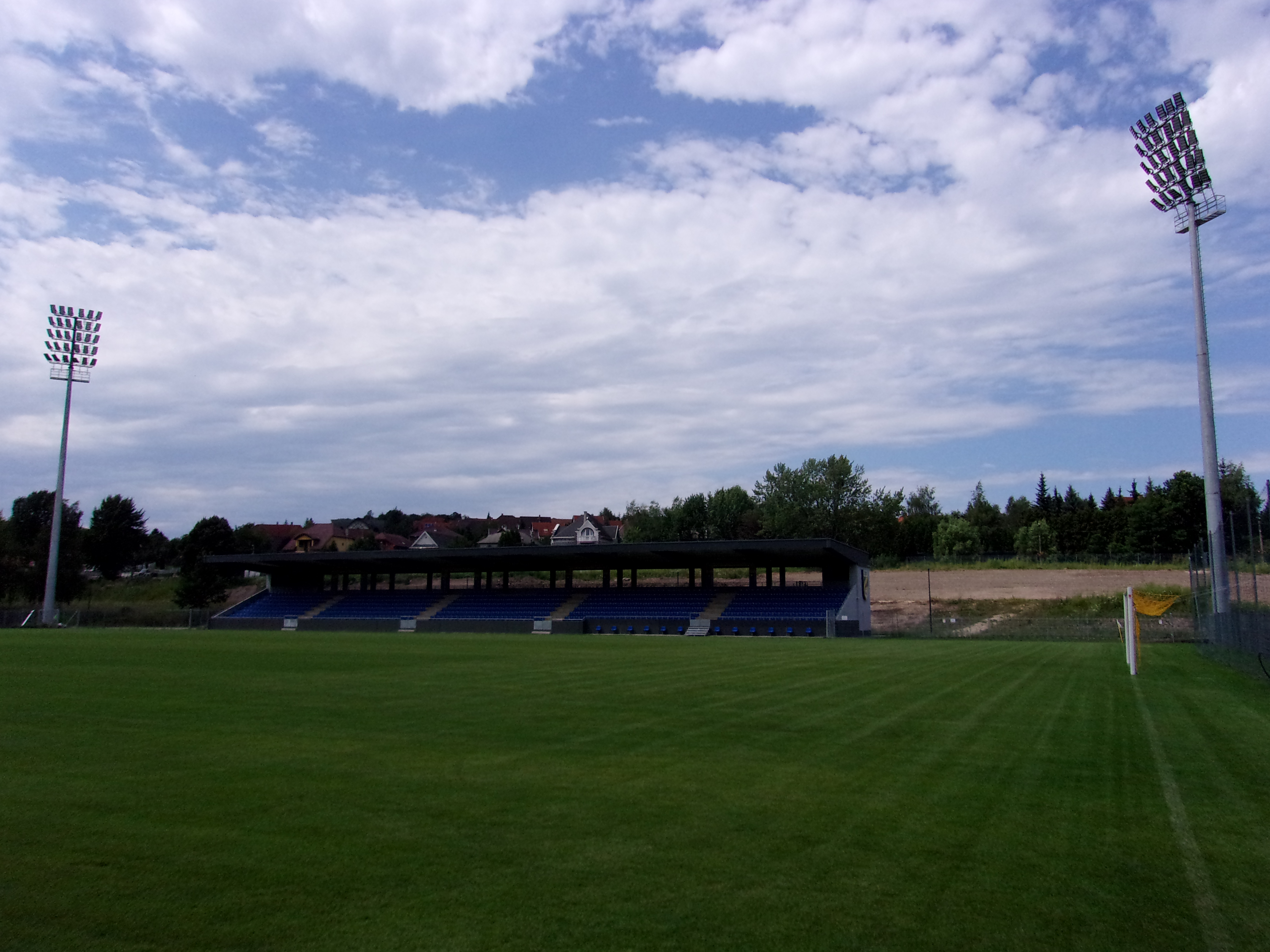
- Interactive map of Kolorcity Aréna
- Former names: Kazincbarcikai Sport Központ
- Location: Kazincbarcika, Hungary Akácfa út 2.
- Coordinates: 48°14′38″N 20°36′37″E
- Owner: Kazincbarcika Város Önkormányzata
- Capacity: 1,020

Construction
- Opened: 2020

Tenant
- Kazincbarcikai SC

Kolorcity Aréna is a sports stadium in Kazincbarcika, Hungary. The stadium is home to the famous association football side Kazincbarcikai SC. The stadium has a capacity of 1,020.

== History ==
The construction of the arena started in 2017 after the team was promoted to Nemzeti Bajnokság II. The old grass pitch located on the Tardonai út side of the former Kazincbarcika Sports Center (KSK) provided the basis for the investment. In the first phase of construction, experts renovated the original pitch, created a laminated playing field, and installed pitch heating and stands.

The home sector can accommodate 920 people, while the guest sector can accommodate 200. In addition, two mobile stands, each with a capacity of 64 people, were installed on the side facing the main building. Both sectors have modern buffets and social rooms, as well as home and guest ticket offices and parking lots in accordance with the regulations.

The Kolorcity Arena was officially opened on 16 August 2020; the event, which was combined with a championship match, was a real celebration in the life of the National Sports City. Since 2022, the club can play their home second league matches in the stadium.

== Attendance ==
=== Records ===
Record Attendance:

- 15,000 Kazincbarcika v Budapest Honvéd, June 1990.

== Gallery ==
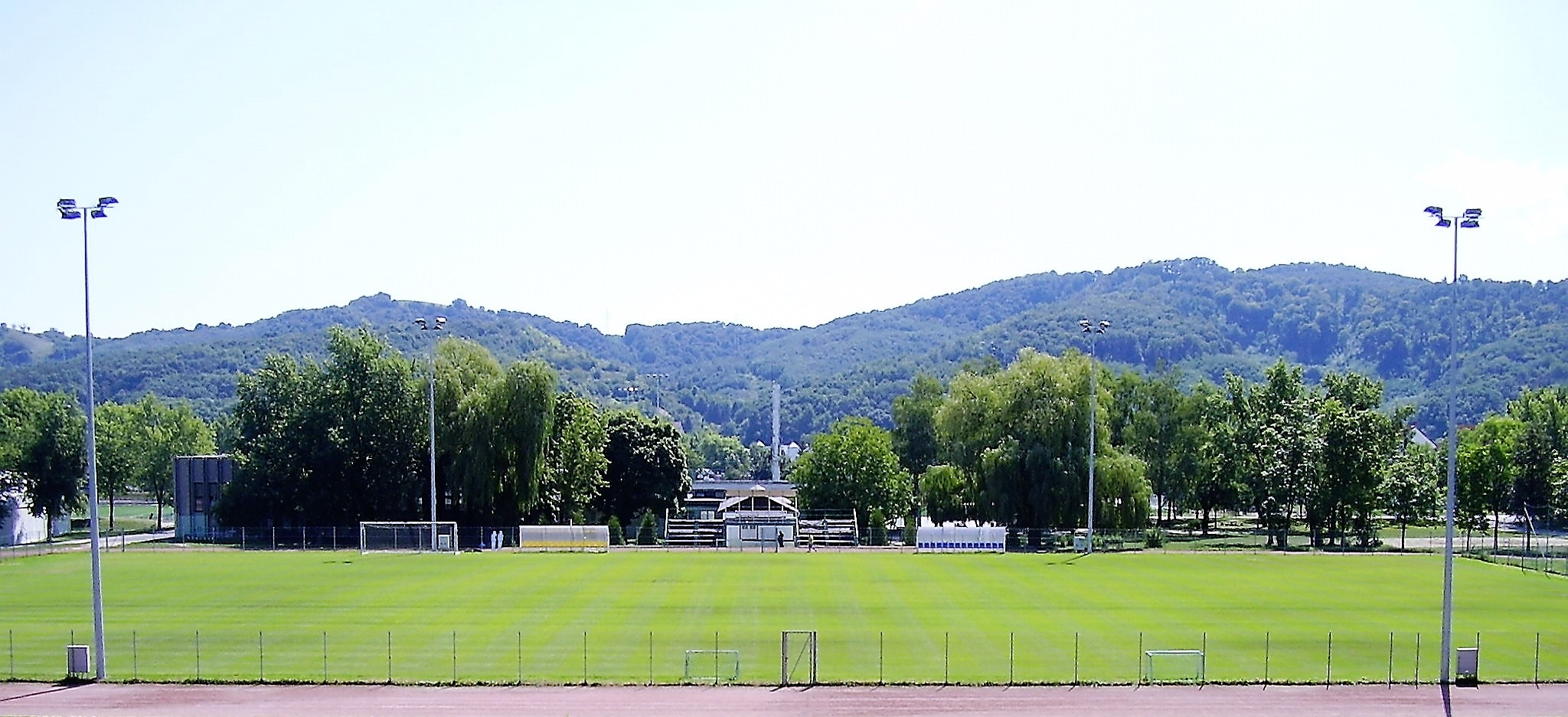
2017
