= Attila Kuttor =

Hungarian footballer and manager

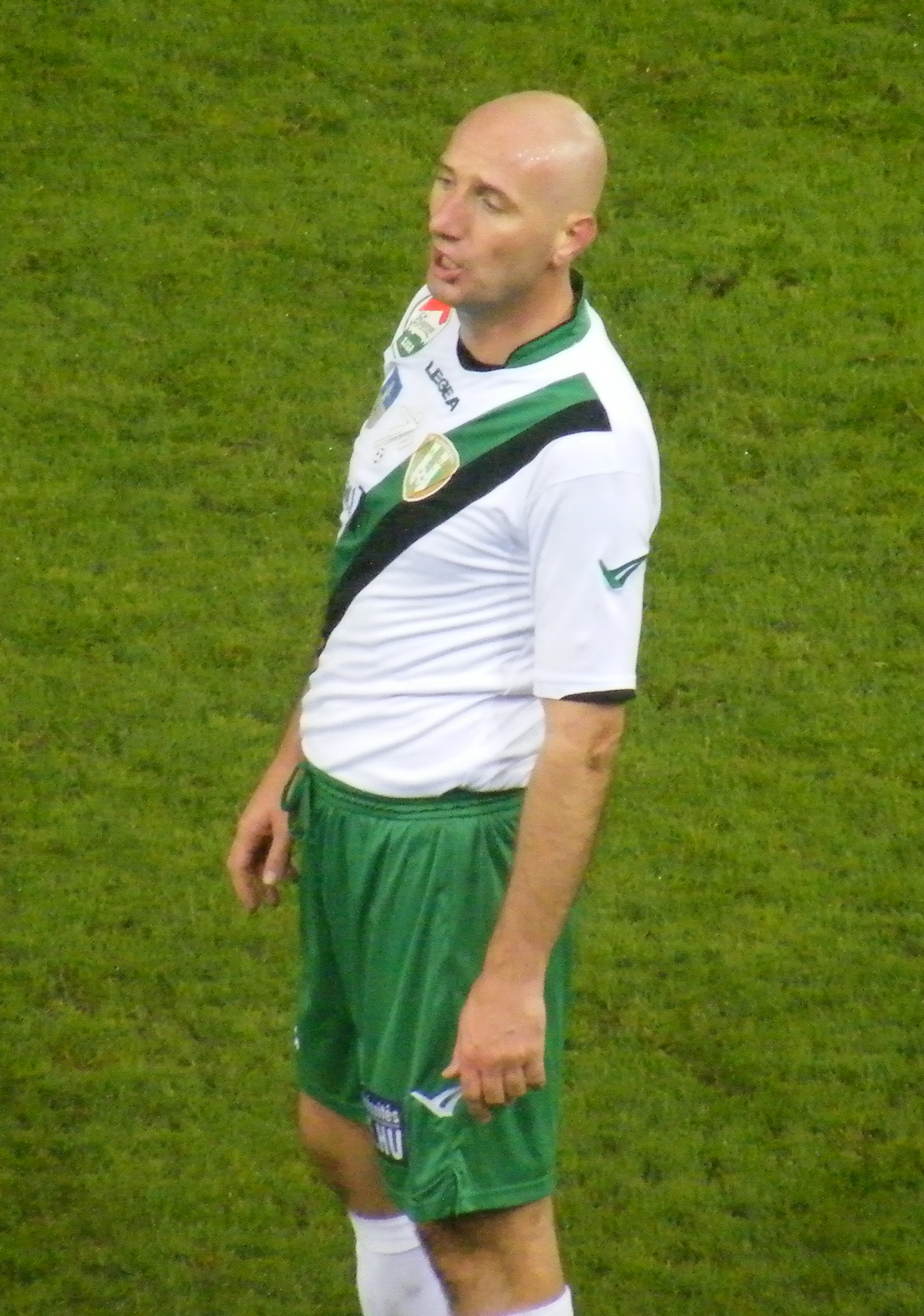

Personal information
- Date of birth: 29 May 1970 (age 56)
- Place of birth: Miskolc, Hungary
- Height: 1.90 m (6 ft 3 in)
- Position: Defender

Team information
- Current team: Kisvárda (manager)

Senior career*
Years	Team	Apps	(Gls)
1988–1989	Diósgyőri VTK	0	(0)
1989–1993	Videoton FC	96	(8)
1993–1995	Győri ETO FC	53	(5)
1995–1998	MTK Budapest FC	90	(7)
1998–1999	Diósgyőri VTK	15	(2)
1998–1999	Videoton FC	13	(4)
1999–2001	MTK Budapest FC	63	(2)
2001–2002	Debreceni VSC	35	(1)
2002–2004	BFC Siófok	61	(6)
2004–2007	Videoton FC	79	(10)
2007–2008	BFC Siófok	14	(2)
2008–2010	Szombathelyi Haladás	55	(4)

International career
1993–2004	Hungary	19	(1)

Managerial career
- 2010–2015: Szombathelyi Haladás U21
- 2015: Szombathelyi Haladás
- 2017–2020: Mezőkövesd
- 2021–2022: Vasas SC
- 2022–2024: Mezőkövesd
- 2025–2026: Kazincbarcika
- 2026–: Kisvárda
- * Club domestic league appearances and goals as of 11 July 2012

Attila Kuttor (born 29 May 1970) is a Hungarian football manager, and former player who is the manager of Kisvárda. Being capped 546 times in the Hungarian League he is the all-time record holder. As a result of his outstanding performances he has been the highest paid football player in Hungary.

== Manager career ==
In 2015, he was the coach of Haladás Szombathely. After the dismissal of Újpest FC manager Nebojša Vignjević he became the longest serving manager in the 2019–20 Nemzeti Bajnokság I. From 2021 to 2022 he was head coach of Vasas SC. On 14 September 2022, he was appointed new head coach of Mezőkövesdi SE. He had previously coached the team from 2017 to 2020.

== Honours ==
MTK Hungária FC

- Hungarian National Championship I winner: 1

1996/97

- Hungarian Cup winner: 3

1996/97, 1997/98, 1999/00

FC Fehérvár

- Hungarian Cup winner: 1

2005/06

Szombathelyi Haladás

- Hungarian National Championship I third place: 1

2008/09
