= Gábor Erős =

Hungarian footballer

Personal information
- Date of birth: 1 July 1980 (age 46)
- Place of birth: Várpalota, Hungary
- Height: 1.73 m (5 ft 8 in)
- Position: Midfielder

Team information
- Current team: Vasas (manager)

Senior career*
Years	Team	Apps	(Gls)
1999–2003	Győr	63	(5)
2003–2004	Honvéd	12	(0)
2004–2006	Pécs	42	(8)
2006	Ferencváros	13	(0)
2006–2008	Panthrakikos	57	(9)
2008–2009	Ionikos	16	(2)
2009–2010	Pyrsos Grevena	15	(5)
2010–2011	Lokomotiv Plovdiv	35	(3)
2011–2012	Doxa Drama	6	(0)
2012–2014	Gyirmót	39	(2)
2014–2017	Várda	71	(41)
2017–2018	Mándok VSE	18	(12)
2018–2019	Várda II	4	(1)
2019–2021	Mándok VSE	10	(7)

Managerial career
- 2021–2022: Kisvárda
- 2022–2023: Kisvárda (assistant)
- 2023–2024: Budafok
- 2024–2025: Kazincbarcika
- 2025–: Vasas
- * Club domestic league appearances and goals

Gábor Erős (born 1 July 1980) is a Hungarian football manager and a former midfielder who is the manager of Vasas.

== Coaching career ==
Erős was appointed caretaker manager of Kisvárda on 10 November 2021, following the dismissal of João Janeiro. On 24 December 2021, he was confirmed as manager on a permanent basis.

On 28 June 2022, László Török was hired as a new head coach and Erős was appointed his assistant.

On 14 June 2024, Erős signed a contract as a head coach of Kazincbarcika.
