= 2024–25 Nemzeti Bajnokság II =

Nemzeti Bajnokság II
- Season: 2024–25
- Dates: 28 July 2024 – 25 May 2025
- Champions: Kisvárda (1st title)
- Promoted: Kisvárda; Kazincbarcika
- Relegated: Gyirmót; Tatabánya
- Matches: 240
- Goals: 640 (2.67 per match)
- Top goalscorer: Zoárd Nagy (Csákvár) (18 goals)
- All statistics correct as of 25 May 2025.

The 2024–25 Nemzeti Bajnokság II (also known as 2024–25 Merkantil Bank Liga for sponsorship reasons) is Hungary's 127th season of the Nemzeti Bajnokság II, the second tier of the Hungarian football league system.

== Overview ==
The fixtures were announced on 5 July 2024. The number of teams in the second division has been reduced by 4 since the 2022–23 season, the first competition with 16 clubs in recent years.

== Teams ==
The following teams have changed division since the 2023–24 season.

=== Changes ===
==== To NB II ====
Relegated from 2023–24 Nemzeti Bajnokság I	Promoted from 2023–24 Nemzeti Bajnokság III
▼ Kisvárda ▼ Mezőkövesd	▲ Békéscsaba (Southeast) ▲ Szentlőrinc (Southwest) ▲ Tatabánya (Northwest)

==== From NB II ====
Promoted to 2024–25 Nemzeti Bajnokság I	Relegated to 2024–25 Nemzeti Bajnokság III	Dissolved
▲ Nyíregyháza ▲ Győr	▼ Pécs (Southwest) ▼ Tiszakécske (Southeast) ▼ Siófok (Southwest) ▼ Mosonmagyaróvár (Northwest)	Haladás

=== Stadium and locations ===
Note: Table lists in alphabetical order.

Location of teams in 2024–25 Nemzeti Bajnokság II
Location of the teams in Budapest.

Team	Location	Stadium	Cap.	2023–24
Ajka	Ajka	Városi Stadion	5,000	8th
Békéscsaba	Békéscsaba	Kórház utcai Stadion	2,479	(NB III, Play-off)
Budafok	Budapest (Budafok)	Promontor utcai Stadion	4,000	10th
BVSC	Budapest (Zugló)	Szőnyi úti Stadion	12,000	13th
Csákvár	Csákvár	Tersztyánszky Ödön Sportközpont	2,020	9th
Gyirmót	Győr (Gyirmót)	Alcufer Stadion	4,728	6th
Honvéd	Budapest (Kispest)	Bozsik Aréna	8,000	11th
Kazincbarcika	Kazincbarcika	Kolorcity Aréna	1,080	12th
Kisvárda	Kisvárda	Várkerti Stadion	3,385	11th (NB I)
Kozármisleny	Kozármisleny	Kozármislenyi Stadion	2,000	5th
Mezőkövesd	Mezőkövesd	Városi Stadion	4,183	12th (NB I)
Soroksár	Budapest (Soroksár)	Szamosi Mihály Sportelep	5,000	7th
Szeged	Szeged	Szent Gellért Fórum	8,136	4th
Szentlőrinc	Szentlőrinc	Szentlőrinci Sportpálya	1,020	(NB III, Play-off)
Tatabánya	Tatabánya	Grosics Gyula Stadion	5,021	(NB III, Play-off)
Vasas	Budapest (Angyalföld)	Illovszky Rudolf Stadion	5,154	3rd

FC Ajka	Békéscsaba	Budafok	BVSC
Városi Stadion	Kórház utcai Stadion	Promontor utcai Stadion	Szőnyi úti Stadion
Capacity: 5,000	Capacity: 4,963	Capacity: 1,200	Capacity: 12,000
Csákvár	Gyirmót	Honvéd	Kazincbarcika
Tersztyánszky Ödön Sportközpont	Ménfői úti Stadion	Bozsik Aréna	Kolorcity Aréna
Capacity: 2,500	Capacity: 4,728	Capacity: 8,200	Capacity: 1,020
Kisvárda	Kozármisleny	Mezőkövesd	Soroksár
Várkerti Stadion	Alkotmány téri Stadion	Városi Stadion	Szamosi Mihály Sportelep
Capacity: 2,850	Capacity: 2,000	Capacity: 4,183	Capacity: 5,000
Szeged	Szentlőrinc	Tatabánya	Vasas
Szent Gellért Fórum	Sportpálya	Grosics Gyula Stadion	Illovszky Rudolf Stadion
Capacity: 8,256	Capacity: 1,020	Capacity: 5,021	Capacity: 5,054

==== Number of teams by counties and regions ====
Number of teams by counties
Pos.	County	No. of teams	Teams
1	Budapest	5	Budafok, BVSC-Zugló, Honvéd, Soroksár and Vasas
2	Baranya	2	Kozármisleny and Szentlőric
2	Borsod-Abaúj-Zemplén	2	Kazincbarcika and Mezőkövesd
4	Békés	1	Békéscsaba
4	Csongrád-Csanád	1	Szeged
4	Fejér	1	Csákvár
4	Győr-Moson-Sopron	1	Gyirmót
4	Komárom-Esztergom	1	Tatabánya
4	Szabolcs-Szatmár-Bereg	1	Kisvárda
4	Veszprém	1	Ajka

Number of teams by regions
Transdanubia	Central Hungary	Great Plain and North
Ajka; Csákvár; Gyirmót; Kozármisleny; Szentlőrinc; Tatabánya	Budafok; BVSC-Zugló; Honvéd; Soroksár; Vasas	Békéscsaba; Kazincbarcika; Kisvárda; Mezőkövesd; Szeged
6 Teams	5 Teams	5 Teams

=== Personnel and kits ===
Hungarian national sports betting brand Tippmix sponsored all 16 teams of the second league since February 2019, their logo were present on all team kits.

Note: Flags indicate national team as has been defined under FIFA eligibility rules. Players and Managers may hold more than one non-FIFA nationality.

Team	Head coach	Captain	Kit maker	Kit sponsor(s)	
Team	Head coach	Captain	Kit maker	Main	Other(s)
Ajka	(Hungary) Bálint Gaál (caretaker)	(Hungary) Richárd Zsolnai	Puma	Bakony Erőmű	None
Békéscsaba	(Hungary) Sándor Csató		Saller	Békés Drén	None
Budafok	(Hungary) Géza Mészöly	(Hungary) Dávid Kovács	2Rule	Zakariás Alapítvány	None
BVSC-Zugló	(Hungary) József Csábi	(Hungary) Paulo Vinícius	Adidas	None	
Csákvár	(Hungary) Balázs Tóth		2Rule	ZÁÉV	List: Back: Aqvital
Gyirmót	(Hungary) Szabolcs Schindler	(Slovakia) Dávid Hudák	Jako	Alcufer	None
Honvéd	(Hungary) Tamás Feczkó	(Croatia) (Hungary) Ivan Lovrić	Macron	None	
Kazincbarcika	(Hungary) Gábor Erős	(Romania) (Hungary) Valter Heil	Puma	GreenPlan	List: Back: BorsodChem; Shorts: BorsodChem
Kisvárda	(Hungary) Tamás Feczkó	(Bosnia and Herzegovina) Jasmin Mešanović	Adidas	MasterGood	None
Kozármisleny	(Hungary) Zoltán Aczél	(Hungary) Gergő Gajág	Macron	HR-Rent	None
Mezőkövesd	(Hungary) Aurél Csertői	(Hungary) Tamás Cseri	Adidas	Zsóry Gyógy- és Strandfürdő	None
Soroksár	(Hungary) Péter Lipcsei	(Hungary) Balázs Lovrencsics	Nike	Provident	List: Front: VízBolt and District of Soroksár; Back: 11teamsports
Szeged	(Serbia) Aleksandar Jović	(Hungary) Molnár F. Tamás	Foreleven11	None	List: Sleeves: caritas Hungarica
Szentlőrinc	(Hungary) Róbert Waltner		Macron	AbsoluteTeamsport	
Tatabánya	(Hungary) László Klausz		Jako	OPUS Tigáz	List: Front: Geodézia and City of Tatabánya
Vasas	(Hungary) Attila Pintér	(Hungary) Zsombor Berecz	Adidas	OTP Bank	List: Sleeves: SMP Solution and PrímaEnergia

==== Managerial changes ====
Team	Outgoing manager	Manner of departure	Date of vacancy	Position in table	Incoming manager	Date of appointment	Ref.
Mezőkövesd	(Serbia) Milan Milanović	End of contract	29 May 2024	Pre-season	(Hungary) Mihály Tóth	29 May 2024	
Kazincbarcika	(Hungary) János Csábi	Mutual consent	1 June 2024	Pre-season	(Hungary) Gábor Erős	15 June 2024	
Szeged	(Slovenia) Adem Kapič	End of contract	4 June 2024	Pre-season	(Germany) Michael Boris	4 June 2024	
BVSC-Zugló	(Hungary) Ádám Kincses	End of contract	10 June 2024	Pre-season	(Hungary) József Csábi	10 June 2024	
Szenlőrinc	(Hungary) Gábor Pinchler	End of contract	18 June 2024	Pre-season	(Hungary) Róbert Waltner	19 June 2024	
Kisvárda	(Hungary) Tamás Feczkó	Resigned	6 August 2024	14th	(Hungary) Attila Révész (caretaker)	30 August 2024	
Honvéd	(Hungary) Aurél Csertői	Sacked	15 August 2024	8th	(Hungary) Zsolt Laczkó	19 August 2024	
Budafok	(Hungary) László Dajka	Resigned	21 August 2024	14th	(Hungary) Márk Nikházi (caretaker)	19 August 2024	
Vasas	(Hungary) Zoltán Gera	Mutual consent	21 August 2024	4th	(Hungary) Attila Pintér	5 September 2024	
Mezőkövesd	(Hungary) Mihály Tóth	Sacked	4 September 2024	16th	(Hungary) Aurél Csertői	27 October 2024	
Szeged	(Germany) Michael Boris	Mutual consent	31 October 2024	9th	(Hungary) Ádám Simon (caretaker)	31 October 2024	
Honvéd	(Hungary) Zsolt Laczkó	Sacked	17 December 2024	16th	(Hungary) Tamás Feczkó	19 December 2024	
Szeged	(Hungary) Ádám Simon (caretaker)	End of caretaker spell	27 December 2024	10th	(Serbia) Aleksandar Jović	27 December 2024	
Tatabánya	(Hungary) Gergely Gyürki	Sacked	17 February 2025	16th	(Hungary) László Klausz	21 February 2025	
Ajka	(Hungary) Szabolcs Schindler	Mutual consent	18 February 2025	14th	(Hungary) Bálint Gaál (caretaker)	18 February 2025	
Budafok	(Hungary) Márk Nikházi	Sacked	18 March 2025	12th	(Hungary) Géza Mészöly	18 March 2025	
Gyirmót	(Hungary) Zsolt Tamási	Sacked	11 April 2025	13th	(Hungary) Szabolcs Schindler	11 April 2025	

== League table ==
Pos	Team	Pld	W	D	L	GF	GA	GD	Pts	Promotion or relegation
1	Kisvárda (C, P)	30	17	7	6	57	44	+13	58	Promotion to Nemzeti Bajnokság I
2	Kazincbarcika (P)	30	14	11	5	51	30	+21	53	Promotion to Nemzeti Bajnokság I
3	Vasas	30	16	4	10	47	35	+12	52	
4	Kozármisleny	30	13	8	9	45	42	+3	47	
5	Szentlőrinc	30	12	11	7	44	32	+12	47	
6	Mezőkövesd	30	12	8	10	44	35	+9	44	
7	Szeged	30	10	12	8	36	32	+4	42	
8	Honvéd	30	11	7	12	41	39	+2	40	
9	BVSC	30	8	14	8	31	32	−1	38	
10	Csákvár	30	10	6	14	41	50	−9	36	
11	Soroksár	30	9	8	13	42	47	−5	35	
12	Ajka	30	8	11	11	31	38	−7	35	
13	Budafok	30	9	8	13	44	53	−9	35	
14	Békéscsaba	30	8	9	13	30	38	−8	33	
15	Gyirmót (R)	30	7	10	13	41	46	−5	31	Relegation to Nemzeti Bajnokság III
16	Tatabánya (R)	30	6	6	18	28	60	−32	24	Relegation to Nemzeti Bajnokság III

Source: Hungarian Football Federation (in Hungarian), Soccerway
Rules for classification: 1) Points; 2) Matches won; 3) Goal difference; 4) Goals scored; 5) Head-to-head points; 6) Head-to-head goal difference; 7) Fair play ranking; 8) Drawing of lots.
(C) Champions; (P) Promoted; (R) Relegated

== Results ==
Home \ Away	AJK	BEK	BUD	BVS	CSA	GYI	HON	KAZ	KIS	KOZ	MEZ	SOR	SZG	SZL	TAT	VAS
Ajka	—	0–1	2–2	0–1	0–1	3–1	2–0	1–1	3–2	1–1	1–1	0–0	0–0	0–1	0–0	2–3
Békéscsaba	3–0	—	2–1	2–2	0–3	1–1	1–1	0–1	2–2	1–1	1–2	4–2	3–1	2–1	1–0	0–2
Budafok	1–2	0–1	—	2–2	2–1	1–1	3–3	0–5	2–4	1–1	3–1	2–1	2–3	2–0	2–3	0–1
BVSC	0–0	1–0	0–0	—	1–2	1–1	1–2	0–0	0–2	1–1	1–3	0–0	0–0	1–1	2–0	2–1
Csákvár	2–2	1–0	1–2	0–1	—	1–2	3–1	3–2	0–1	3–2	2–1	1–3	1–1	0–4	2–2	2–1
Gyirmót	0–1	1–0	1–1	2–2	0–4	—	3–1	0–0	1–1	2–3	2–0	4–0	0–1	1–1	4–1	1–2
Honvéd	1–2	3–0	1–2	0–1	2–1	2–1	—	0–1	3–0	5–0	2–1	3–2	1–1	0–1	1–0	1–0
Kazincbarcika	1–1	2–1	1–0	0–1	2–0	2–1	2–0	—	1–1	2–3	1–1	3–2	2–1	2–0	3–1	0–0
Kisvárda	4–0	1–0	1–2	3–2	2–0	6–4	1–1	1–1	—	3–2	2–1	2–1	1–1	4–3	2–1	0–0
Kozármisleny	1–0	1–1	2–0	0–1	2–0	3–2	2–0	2–1	2–3	—	0–1	1–1	0–0	1–1	3–2	4–2
Mezőkövesd	1–1	1–0	3–3	0–0	3–1	1–1	2–0	2–2	4–1	0–1	—	0–1	1–2	1–3	4–2	3–0
Soroksár	3–1	0–0	3–2	3–3	3–1	1–2	3–1	0–1	1–2	3–1	0–2	—	1–1	1–1	2–0	3–2
Szeged	0–2	2–0	1–2	2–2	2–2	1–1	0–0	4–1	2–1	2–0	1–0	2–1	—	1–3	2–0	0–1
Szentlőrinc	2–0	1–1	3–2	1–0	1–1	2–0	0–0	2–2	1–2	0–2	0–0	3–1	0–0	—	5–1	2–1
Tatabánya	1–2	1–1	1–2	2–1	2–2	2–1	1–4	0–7	0–1	0–2	0–2	0–0	3–2	0–0	—	1–0
Vasas	3–2	3–1	2–0	2–1	3–0	1–0	2–2	2–2	3–1	3–1	1–2	2–0	1–0	3–1	0–1	—

Updated to match(es) played on 25 May 2025. Source: Hungarian Football Federation (in Hungarian), Soccerway
Legend: Blue = home team win; Yellow = draw; Red = away team win.
For upcoming matches, an "a" indicates there is an article about the rivalry between the two participants.

== Statistics ==
=== Top goalscorers ===
As of 25 May 2025

Rank	Player	Club	Goals
1	(Hungary) Zoárd Nagy	Csákvár	18
2	(Hungary) Krisztián Kirchner	Kozármisleny	17
3	(Hungary) Balázs Lovrencsics	Soroksár	14
3	(Hungary) Milán Tóth	Vasas	14
5	(Hungary) Csanád Novák	Szeged	12
6	(Hungary) Áron Borvető	Szeged	11
6	(Hungary) Bence Pethő	Kazincbarcika	11
6	(Hungary) Kristóf Tóth-Gábor	Szentlőrinc	11
9	(Hungary) József Szalai	Mezőkövesd	10
10	(Hungary) Ádám Bódi	Kazincbarcika	9
10	(Hungary) Ádám Czékus	Békéscsaba	9
10	(Hungary) Ádám Merényi	Budafok	9
10	(Hungary) Szilárd Szabó	Soroksár	9

=== Hat-tricks ===
Player	For	Against	Result	Date	Round
(Hungary) Bence Pethő	Kazincbarcika	Budafok	5–0 (A)	18 August 2024	4
(Hungary) Krisztián Kirchner	Kozármisleny	Vasas	4–2 (H)	25 August 2024	5
(Hungary) Patrik Bacsa	BVSC-Zugló	Soroksár	3–3 (A)	25 May 2025	30

== Attendances ==
#	Club	Average
1	Honvéd	2,272
2	Vasas	1,579
3	Kisvárda	1,266
4	Tatabánya	961
5	Szeged	955
6	Békéscsaba	932
7	Mezőkövesd	820
8	Ajka	800
9	Gyirmót	775
10	Kozármisleny	713
11	Kazincbarcika	617
12	Szentlőrinc	607
13	Budafok	488
14	Soroksár	433
15	BVSC	399
16	Csákvár	281

== See also ==
- 2024–25 Magyar Kupa
- 2024–25 Nemzeti Bajnokság I
- 2024–25 Nemzeti Bajnokság III
- 2024–25 Megyei Bajnokság I
