= Kazincbarcikai SC =

Hungarian football club

Kolorcity Kazincbarcika
- Full name: Kolorcity Kazincbarcikai Sport Club
- Nickname: Barcika
- Founded: 1957; 69 years ago
- Ground: Kolorcity Aréna, Kazincbarcika
- Capacity: 8,000
- Chairman: János László
- Manager: Attila Kuttor
- League: NB II
- 2025–26: NB I, 12nd of 12 (relegated)
- Website: kbsc.hu
Home colours	Away colours	Third colours

Kazincbarcikai SC is a Hungarian professional football club based in Kazincbarcika. The team plays in the Nemzeti Bajnokság I, the top tier of Hungarian football, after promotion from the Nemzeti Bajnokság II in 2025. Playing in yellow and blue, the team's home is the Kolorcity Aréna.

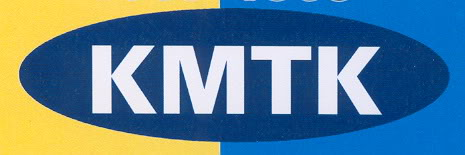
Kazincbarcika former logo

== History ==
On 14 June 2024, Gábor Erős was appointed as the manager of the club.

In the 2024–25 Nemzeti Bajnokság II season, Kazincbarcika were in the second position before the last matchday. Kazincbarcika was just one point ahead of Vasas. On 25 May 2025, Kazincbarcika drew with Kisvárda FC at the Varkérti stadium, while Vasas SC also drew (2–2) with Budapest Honvéd FC at the Bozsik Aréna. The two draws meant that Kazincbarcika finished in the second position and were promoted to the Nemzeti Bajnokság I for the first time in the club's history. The goal was scored by Nimród Baranyai. The following day, Gábor Erős, the manager, was expected to discuss his future at the club.

In the 2025–26 Nemzeti Bajnokság I season, Kazincbarcika started their first Nemzeti Bajnokság I with a 2–1 defeat from Puskás Akadémia FC at the Pancho Aréna on 27 July 2025. Their second match also ended with a 3–0 defeat from Ferencvárosi TC at the Groupama Arena on 2 August 2025. Their first home match ended with a 2–1 defeat from Debreceni VSC at the Mezőkövesdi Városi Stadion on 8 August 2025. Kazincbarcika's first point was gained when Kazincbarcika drew with Borsod-rivals Diósgyőri VTK at the Diósgyőri Stadion on 16 August 2025. On 20 September 2025, Kaznicbarcika won their first ever Nemzeti Bajnokság I match by beating Újpest FC at the Mezőkövesdi Városi Stadion. The goals were scored by Meshack Ubochioma in the 17th minute and Bence Sós in the 27th minute. However, their victory over Újpest was marred by a 5–0 defeat from Zalaegerszegi TE at the ZTE Arena on 27 September 2025. On 3 October 2025, Kazincbarcika collected three points again by beating MTK Budapest FC 3–1 at their home.

In 2026, it was announced that the team would play their home matches at the Diósgyőri Stadion instead of the Mezőkövesdi Városi Stadion.

== Honours ==
- Nemzeti Bajnokság II:
  - Winners (1): 1981–82
- Nemzeti Bajnokság III:
  - Winners (4): 1976–77, 1986–87, 2016–17, 2021–22

== Managers ==
- Gábor Erős (14 June 2024–5 June 2025)
- Attila Kuttor (5 June 2025–present)

== Seasons ==
=== League positions ===
As of 13 July 2025

- Between 1970–71 and 1973–74, 1997–98 and 1999–2000, 2001–02 and 2004–05 the third tier league called NB II.
- In 1986–87 the third tier league called Regional League.
- In 2000–01 the fourth tier league called NB III.

== First team squad ==
As of 20 August 2026

Note: Flags indicate national team as defined under FIFA eligibility rules; some limited exceptions apply. Players may hold more than one non-FIFA nationality.

No.	Pos.	Nation	Player
1	GK	HUN	Dániel Gyollai
4	DF	HUN	Zsombor Nagy
5	DF	HUN	László Rácz
6	MF	HUN	Gergő Szőke
7	MF	HUN	Martin Hudák
8	MF	HUN	Martin Palincsár
10	MF	HUN	Bálint Kártik (captain)
11	DF	HUN	János Ferenczi
16	MF	HUN	Zsombor Juhász
17	DF	HUN	Vince Nyíri
18	MF	HUN	Ronald Schuszter
19	MF	HUN	Mátyás Gresó
20	MF	HUN	László Varjas
21	MF	UKR	Maksym Burdika

No.	Pos.	Nation	Player
24	FW	HUN	Gennadiy Szikszai
28	FW	HUN	Noel Kenesei
29	FW	NGA	Pascal Okoronkwo
30	MF	HUN	Zsombor Boros
37	DF	UKR	Myroslav Babyak
47	DF	HUN	Tibor Szabó (on loan from Honvéd)
66	MF	HUN	Bálint Ferencsik
71	DF	UKR	Nazar Kolyada (on loan from Kisvárda)
75	GK	HUN	Benedek Lipóczi
77	DF	UKR	Taras Vepryka (on loan from Kisvárda)
88	FW	HUN	Bence Trencsényi
89	GK	HUN	Botond Kocsis (on loan from Győr II)
99	DF	UKR	Román Jazsik (on loan from Kisvárda)

=== Out on loan ===
Note: Flags indicate national team as defined under FIFA eligibility rules; some limited exceptions apply. Players may hold more than one non-FIFA nationality.

No. / Pos. / Nation / Player; — / FW / UKR / Maksym Pukhtyeyev (on loan at Dordoi Bishkek)	No. / Pos. / Nation / Player
