= 2021–22 Kisvárda FC season =

Kisvárda FC
2021–22 season
- Chairman: Attila Révész
- Manager: João Janeiro (until 10 November); Gábor Erős (from 10 November)
- Stadium: Várkerti Stadion
- Nemzeti Bajnokság I: 2nd
- Hungarian Cup: Round of 16
- Top goalscorer: League: Claudiu Bumba (11); All: Claudiu Bumba (11)
- Highest home attendance: 3,250 vs Ferencváros (7 November 2021); Nemzeti Bajnokság I
- Lowest home attendance: 1,100 vs MTK Budapest (27 October 2021); Hungarian Cup
- Average home league attendance: 2,307
- Biggest win: 5–0 vs Zalaegerszeg (H) (31 October 2021); Nemzeti Bajnokság I 5–0 vs MTK Budapest (H) (27 November 2021); Nemzeti Bajnokság I
- Biggest defeat: 0–4 vs Ferencváros (H) (7 November 2021); Nemzeti Bajnokság I
Home colours	Away colours	Third colours
- All statistics correct as of 16 May 2022.

The 2021–22 season was Kisvárda FC's 4th season in the OTP Bank Liga and the 19th in existence as a football club.

== Squad ==
As of match played 29 July 2021

No.	Name	Nationality	Position	Date of birth (age)	Signed from	Signed in	Apps.	Goals
Goalkeepers
12	Artem Odintsov	(Ukraine)	GK	9 November 2000 (aged 20)	youth sector	2020	0	0
23	Márk Németh	(Hungary)	GK	20 April 2002 (aged 19)	Újpest II	2021	0	0
32	Dávid Dombó	(Hungary)	GK	26 February 1993 (aged 28)	Mezőkövesd	2020	0	0
Defenders
2	Viktor Hey	(Ukraine)	DF	2 February 1996 (aged 25)	Hoverla Uzhhorod	2016	0	0
4	Anton Kravchenko	(Ukraine)	DF	23 March 1991 (aged 30)	Olimpik Donetsk	2019	0	0
5	Lazar Ćirković	(Serbia)	DF	22 August 1992 (aged 28)	Maccabi Netanya	2020	0	0
18	Bohdan Melnyk	(Ukraine)	DF	4 January 1997 (aged 24)	Vorskla-2 Poltava	2017	0	0
19	Herdi Prenga	(Albania)	DF	31 August 1994 (aged 26)	Riga	2021	0	0
25	Matheus Leoni	(Brazil)	DF	20 September 1991 (aged 29)	Arda Kardzhali	2021	0	0
33	Tamás Rubus	(Hungary)	DF	13 July 1989 (aged 32)	Nyíregyháza	2019	0	0
Midfielders
6	Bence Ötvös	(Hungary)	MF	13 March 1998 (aged 23)	Nyíregyháza	2021	0	0
8	Yanis Karabelyov	(Bulgaria)	MF	23 January 1996 (aged 25)	Slavia Sofia	2021	0	0
10	Claudiu Bumba	(Romania)	MF	5 January 1994 (aged 27)	Adanaspor	2019	0	0
11	Lucas	(Hungary)	MF	6 May 1989 (aged 32)	Bodva Moldava	2015	0	0
13	Lazar Zličić	(Serbia)	MF	7 February 1997 (aged 24)	Voždovac	2020	0	0
45	Slobodan Simović	(Serbia)	MF	22 May 1989 (aged 32)	BATE Borisov	2020	0	0
70	Levente Szőr	(Hungary)	MF	14 January 2001 (aged 20)	youth sector	2019	0	0
Forwards
7	Driton Camaj	(Montenegro)	FW	7 March 1997 (aged 24)	Iskra Danilovgrad	2020	0	0
17	Jasir Asani	(Albania)	FW	19 May 1995 (aged 26)	Partizani Tirana	2021	0	0
20	Jaroslav Navrátil	(Czech Republic)	FW	30 December 1991 (aged 29)	Go Ahead Eagles	2020	0	0
21	András Gosztonyi	(Hungary)	FW	7 November 1990 (aged 30)	Śląsk Wrocław	2016	0	0
23	Richárd Jelena	(Hungary)	FW	8 January 1998 (aged 23)	Kozármisleny	2020	0	0
27	Jasmin Mešanović	(Bosnia and Herzegovina)	FW	6 January 1992 (aged 29)	Sarajevo	2021	0	0
67	Mihály Nagy	(Hungary)	FW	20 June 1992 (aged 29)	Ajka	2021	0	0
TBA	Vasyl Khimich	(Ukraine)	FW	17 May 2001 (aged 20)	youth sector	2021	0	0
Players away on loan
Players who left during the season

== Transfers ==
=== Summer ===
In: Note: Flags indicate national team as defined under FIFA eligibility rules; some limited exceptions apply. Players may hold more than one non-FIFA nationality.

No.	Pos.	Nation	Player
1	GK	HUN	Illés Zöldesi (loan return from Debreceni EAC)
6	MF	HUN	Bence Ötvös (from Nyíregyháza)
7	FW	ALB	Jasir Asani (from (Albania) Partizani Tirana)
14	FW	HUN	Mihály Nagy (from Ajka)
19	FW	BIH	Jasmin Mešanović (from (Bosnia and Herzegovina) Sarajevo)
23	GK	HUN	Márk Németh (from Újpest II)
71	DF	ROU	Andrei Peteleu (from (Romania) UTA Arad)
88	MF	HUN	Erik Czérna (from Kisvárda II)

Out: Note: Flags indicate national team as defined under FIFA eligibility rules; some limited exceptions apply. Players may hold more than one non-FIFA nationality.

No.	Pos.	Nation	Player
1	GK	HUN	Illés Zöldesi (to Debrecen)
1	GK	ROU	Mihai Mincă (released)
7	FW	BRA	Sassá (released)
9	FW	HUN	Zoltán Horváth (to Diósgyőr)
14	DF	ROU	Cornel Ene (to Gyirmót)
19	FW	BRA	Fernando Viana (to Újpest)
23	FW	HUN	Márk Kovácsréti (to MTK Budapest)
23	FW	HUN	Richárd Jelena (to (Romania) Csíkszereda)

=== Winter ===
In: Note: Flags indicate national team as defined under FIFA eligibility rules; some limited exceptions apply. Players may hold more than one non-FIFA nationality.

No.	Pos.	Nation	Player
—	MF	POL	Rafał Makowski (from (Poland) Śląsk Wrocław)
—	GK	UKR	Mykhaylo Hotra (from (Ukraine) Uzhhorod)

Out: Note: Flags indicate national team as defined under FIFA eligibility rules; some limited exceptions apply. Players may hold more than one non-FIFA nationality.

No.	Pos.	Nation	Player
11	MF	HUN	Lucas (loan to Diósgyőr)
23	GK	HUN	Márk Németh

== Pre–season and friendlies ==
Win Draw Loss Fixtures

36 June 2021 Friendly	Kazincbarcika (Hungary)	1–3	Kisvárda	Kazincbarcika, Hungary
CEST	Radu 2'	Report	Camaj 49' (pen.); Gosztonyi 62'; Jelena 72'	Stadium: Pete András Stadion; Attendance: 100; Referee: Róbert Nagy

30 June 2021 Friendly	Békéscsaba (Hungary)	1–2	Kisvárda	Békéscsaba, Hungary
CEST	Sz. Varga	Report	Simović; Nagy	Stadium: Kórház utcai Stadion

3 July 2021 Friendly	Diósgyőr (Hungary)	3–2	Kisvárda	Miskolc, Hungary
CEST	Zsolnai 42'; Könyves 57' (pen.); Suljić 66'	Report	Jelena 48'; Ötvös 86'	Stadium: DVTK Stadion; Referee: Rúsz

8 July 2021 Friendly	Kisvárda	2–2	(Romania) Argeș Pitești
CEST	Nagy 43'; Bumba 53'	Report	Dumitrașcu 11'; Honciu 82'

12 July 2021 Friendly	Kisvárda	2–1	(Russia) FK Rostov	Bad Blumau, Austria
CEST	Mešanović 6', 31'	Report	Osipenko 74'

15 July 2021 Friendly	Kisvárda	3–2	(Israel) Maccabi Petah Tikva
CEST	Bumba 54' (pen.); Ötvös 59'; Leoni 78'	Report	Cohen 19'; Ronen 48'

24 July 2021 Friendly	Győr (Hungary)	1–1	Kisvárda	Budapest, Hungary
CEST	Priskin 12' (pen.)	Report	Ćirković 77'	Stadium: Vízművek Sportpálya; Referee: Dombi

== Competitions ==
=== Overview ===
Competition	First match	Last match	Starting round	Final position	Record							
Competition	First match	Last match	Starting round	Final position	Pld	W	D	L	GF	GA	GD	Win %
Nemzeti Bajnokság I	31 July 2021	15 May 2022	Matchday 1	2nd	33	16	11	6	50	34	+16	48.48
Hungarian Cup	18 September 2021	8 February 2022	Round of 64	Round of 16	3	2	0	1	7	3	+4	66.67
Total					36	18	11	7	57	37	+20	50.00

Last updated: 16 May 2022
Source: Competitions

=== Nemzeti Bajnokság I ===
==== League table ====
Pos	Team	Pld	W	D	L	GF	GA	GD	Pts	Qualification or relegation
1	Ferencváros (C)	33	22	5	6	60	31	+29	71	Qualification for the Champions League first qualifying round
2	Kisvárda	33	16	11	6	50	34	+16	59	Qualification for the Europa Conference League second qualifying round (Note: Since the winners of the 2021–22 Magyar Kupa, Ferencváros, qualified for the Champions League, the Europa Conference League berth awarded to the Magyar Kupa winners was transferred to the highest-placed Nemzeti Bajnokság I team not already qualified for European competition, the fourth-placed team.)
3	Puskás Akadémia	33	14	12	7	43	34	+9	54	Qualification for the Europa Conference League second qualifying round
4	Fehérvár	33	13	9	11	48	43	+5	48	Qualification for the Europa Conference League second qualifying round
5	Újpest	33	12	8	13	50	48	+2	44	

Source: Hungarian Football Federation (in Hungarian), Soccerway
Rules for classification: 1) Points; 2) Matches won; 3) Goal difference; 4) Goals scored; 5) Head-to-head points; 6) Head-to-head goal difference; 7) Head-to-head away goals scored; 8) Fair play ranking; 9) Drawing of lots.
(C) Champions

==== Results summary ====
Overall								Home						Away					
Pld	W	D	L	GF	GA	GD	Pts	W	D	L	GF	GA	GD	W	D	L	GF	GA	GD
33	16	11	6	50	34	+16	59	11	3	2	32	17	+15	5	8	4	18	17	+1

Last updated: 16 May 2022.
Source: Soccerway

==== Results by round ====
Round	1	2	3	4	5	6	7	8	9	10	11	12	13	14	15	16	17	18	19	20	21	22	23	24	25	26	27	28	29	30	31	32	33
Ground	A	H	A	A	H	A	H	A	H	A	H	H	A	H	H	A	H	A	H	A	H	A	A	H	A	A	H	A	H	A	H	A	H
Result	W	W	W	L	W	W	W	L	D	D	W	L	D	W	W	W	D	D	W	D	D	D	L	W	D	L	L	D	W	D	W	W	W
Position	3	2	1	1	1	1	1	2	1	2	2	3	3	3	2	1	2	3	3	3	3	3	3	3	3	3	3	3	2	3	2	2	2

Updated to match(es) played on 15 May 2022. Source: Matches
A = Away; H = Home; W = Win; D = Draw; L = Loss

==== Matches ====
31 July 2021 1	Ferencváros	1–2	Kisvárda	Budapest
17:45 CEST	R. Mmaee 80' (pen.)	Report	Leoni 46'; Navrátil 64'	Stadium: Groupama Arena; Attendance: 6,139; Referee: Mihály Káprály

6 August 2021 2	Kisvárda	2–1	Gyirmót	Kisvárda
20:00 CEST	Melnyk 31'; Bumba 56'	Report	Varga 36'	Stadium: Várkerti Stadion; Attendance: 2,022; Referee: Csaba Pintér

13 August 2021 3	MTK Budapest	1–2	Kisvárda	Budapest
20:00 CEST	Grozav 32'	Report	Hey 69'; Mešanović 75'	Stadium: Hidegkuti Nándor Stadion; Attendance: 1,500; Referee: Péter Antal

21 August 2021 4	Fehérvár	2–1	Kisvárda	Székesfehérvár
18:15 CEST	Zivzivadze 44'; Dárdai 76'	Report	Mešanović 90+1'	Stadium: MOL Aréna Sóstó; Attendance: 2,429; Referee: Balázs Berke

28 August 2021 5	Kisvárda	2–0	Mezőkövesd	Kisvárda
16:00 CEST	Mešanović 35'; Navrátil 64'	Report		Stadium: Várkerti Stadion; Attendance: 2,289; Referee: Mihály Káprály

12 September 2021 6	Puskás Akadémia	0–1	Kisvárda	Felcsút
17:30 CEST		Report	Bumba 42'	Stadium: Pancho Aréna; Attendance: 880; Referee: Ádám Farkas

26 September 2021 7	Kisvárda	2–1	Debrecen	Kisvárda
14:15 CEST	Mešanović 50'; Zličić 90'	Report	Varga 11'	Stadium: Várkerti Stadion; Attendance: 2,980; Referee: Tamás Bognár

1 October 2021 8	Budapest Honvéd	2–1	Kisvárda	Budapest
20:00 CEST	Klemenz 6'; Machach 90+3'	Report	Tamás 2' (o.g.)	Stadium: Bozsik Stadion; Attendance: 2,339; Referee: Gergő Bogár

17 October 2021 9	Kisvárda	0–0	Újpest	Kisvárda
14:30 CEST		Report		Stadium: Várkerti Stadion; Attendance: 2,520; Referee: Csaba Pintér

22 October 2021 10	Paks	2–2	Kisvárda	Paks
17:45 CEST	Ádám 20' (pen.); Bognár 22'	Report	Asani 4'; Navrátil 65'	Stadium: Fehérvári úti Stadion; Attendance: 1,245; Referee: Balázs Berke

31 October 2021 11	Kisvárda	5–0	Zalaegerszeg	Kisvárda
14:30 CET	Navrátil 19', 34'; Camaj 74', 83', 86'	Report		Stadium: Várkerti Stadion; Attendance: 2,043; Referee: Tamás Bognár

7 November 2021 12	Kisvárda	0–4	Ferencváros	Kisvárda
15:30 CET		Report	Lončar 27'; Uzuni 69', 90'; Marin 74'	Stadium: Várkerti Stadion; Attendance: 3,250; Referee: Ádám Farkas

20 November 2021 13	Gyirmót	1–1	Kisvárda	Győr
17:00 CET	Ikić 90+2'	Report	Bumba 11' (pen.)	Stadium: Ménfői úti Stadion; Attendance: 864; Referee: Mihály Káprály

27 November 2021 14	Kisvárda	5–0	MTK Budapest	Kisvárda
14:45 CET	Asani 8', 31'; Leoni 51'; Bumba 59'; Mešanović 69'	Report		Stadium: Várkerti Stadion; Attendance: 1,950; Referee: József Erdős

5 December 2021 15	Kisvárda	2–1	Fehérvár	Kisvárda
13:30 CET	Ćirković 4'; Asani 22'	Report	Nikolić 27'	Stadium: Várkerti Stadion; Attendance: 1,521; Referee: Péter Solymosi

12 December 2021 16	Mezőkövesd	0–2	Kisvárda	Mezőkövesd
18:45 CET		Report	Prenga 67'; Mešanović 76'	Stadium: Városi Stadion; Attendance: 1,211; Referee: Ádám Farkas

19 December 2021 17	Kisvárda	1–1	Puskás Akadémia	Kisvárda
13:00 CET	Bumba 28' (pen.)	Report	Corbu 4'	Stadium: Várkerti Stadion; Attendance: 1,890; Referee: Balázs Berke

29 January 2022 18	Debrecen	0–0	Kisvárda	Debrecen
17:00 CET		Report		Stadium: Nagyerdei Stadion; Attendance: 2,570; Referee: Sándor Andó-Szabó

5 February 2022 19	Kisvárda	3–2	Budapest Honvéd	Kisvárda
14:45 CET	Kravchenko 11'; Bumba 66'; Melnyk 68'	Report	Batik 3'; Zsótér 29'	Stadium: Várkerti Stadion; Attendance: 2,100; Referee: Tamás Bognár

11 February 2022 20	Újpest	0–0	Kisvárda	Budapest
20:00 CET		Report		Stadium: Szusza Ferenc Stadion; Attendance: 1,810; Referee: Balázs Berke

19 February 2022 21	Kisvárda	3–3	Paks	Kisvárda
14:45 CET	Mešanović 4'; Melnyk 12'; Asani 75'	Report	Papp 44', 51'; Böde 71'	Stadium: Várkerti Stadion; Attendance: 2,155; Referee: József Erdős

26 February 2022 22	Zalaegerszeg	0–0	Kisvárda	Zalaegerszeg
14:30 CET		Report		Stadium: ZTE Arena; Attendance: 1,129; Referee: Sándor Andó-Szabó

6 March 2022 23	Ferencváros	2–1	Kisvárda	Budapest
17:45 CET	Boli 58'; Nguen 90+1'	Report	Bumba 31' (pen.)	Stadium: Groupama Arena; Attendance: 6,727; Referee: Csaba Pintér

13 March 2022 24	Kisvárda	1–0	Gyirmót	Kisvárda
14:30 CET	Mešanović 45'	Report		Stadium: Várkerti Stadion; Attendance: 2,120; Referee: Péter Antal

19 March 2022 25	MTK Budapest	0–0	Kisvárda	Budapest
19:45 CET		Report		Stadium: Hidegkuti Nándor Stadion; Attendance: 1,758; Referee: István Vad

2 April 2022 26	Fehérvár	5–3	Kisvárda	Székesfehérvár
17:00 CEST	Nikolić 15', 85' (pen.); Bamgboye 18'; Žulj 59'; Kodro 80'	Report	Bumba 8'; Navrátil 10'; Camaj 12'; Kravchenko (red card) 84'	Stadium: MOL Aréna Sóstó; Attendance: 2,054; Referee: József Erdős

9 April 2022 27	Kisvárda	1–2	Mezőkövesd	Kisvárda
14:45 CEST	Karabelyov 30'	Report	Jurina 7'; Cseke 67'	Stadium: Várkerti Stadion; Attendance: 1,520; Referee: Bence Csonka

17 April 2022 28	Puskás Akadémia	0–0	Kisvárda	Felcsút
17:00 CEST		Report		Stadium: Pancho Aréna; Attendance: 1,465; Referee: Balázs Berke

23 April 2022 29	Kisvárda	1–0	Debrecen	Kisvárda
14:00 CEST	Bumba 53' (pen.)	Report		Stadium: Várkerti Stadion; Attendance: 2,455; Referee: Péter Zierkelbach

30 April 2022 30	Budapest Honvéd	1–1	Kisvárda	Budapest
17:00 CEST	Lukić 8'	Report	Bumba 85'	Stadium: Bozsik Aréna; Attendance: 3,358; Referee: Csaba Pintér

5 May 2022 31	Kisvárda	2–1	Újpest	Kisvárda
18:00 CEST	Bumba 4'; Asani 30'	Report	Diaby 44'	Stadium: Várkerti Stadion; Attendance: 2,980; Referee: József Erdős

8 May 2022 32	Paks	0–1	Kisvárda	Paks
14:05 CEST	Szélpál (yellow card) 39'; Kinyik (yellow card) 47'; Gévay (yellow card) 74'	Report	Camaj 31'; Karabelyov (yellow card) 40'; Mešanović (yellow card) 90'	Stadium: Fehérvári úti Stadion; Attendance: 1,200; Referee: Csaba Pintér

15 May 2022 33	Kisvárda	2–1	Zalaegerszeg	Kisvárda
16:00 CEST	Leoni 13'; Karabelyov 90+2'	Report	Tajti 37' (pen.)	Stadium: Várkerti Stadion; Attendance: 3,125; Referee: Csaba Pintér

=== Hungarian Cup ===
18 September 2021 Round of 64	Debreceni EAC	0–2	Kisvárda	Debrecen
15:00 CEST		Report	Zličić 51'; Camaj 76'	Stadium: DEAC pálya Attendance: 300; Referee: József Ducsai

27 October 2021 Round of 32	Kisvárda	4–1	MTK Budapest	Kisvárda
17:00 CEST	Camaj 17', 33'; Asani 44'; Zličić 53'	Report	Kocsis 62'	Stadium: Várkerti Stadion; Attendance: 1,100; Referee: Márton Rúsz

8 February 2022 Round of 16	Újpest	2–1	Kisvárda	Budapest
17:15 CET	Simon 74'; Csongvai 90+3'	Report	Camaj 68'	Stadium: Szusza Ferenc Stadion; Attendance: 1,000; Referee: István Vad

=== Appearances and goals ===
No.	Pos	Nat	Player	Total		OTP Bank Liga		Hungarian Cup	
No.	Pos	Nat	Player	Apps	Goals	Apps	Goals	Apps	Goals
Goalkeepers
12	GK	(Ukraine) UKR	Artem Odintsov	8	-6	6	-5	2	-1
32	GK	(Hungary) HUN	Dávid Dombó	27	-29	27	-29	0	-0
80	GK	(Ukraine) UKR	Zden Perehanec	0	0	0	-0	0	-0
99	GK	(Ukraine) UKR	Mykhaylo Hotra	1	-2	0	-0	1	-2
Defenders
2	DF	(Ukraine) UKR	Viktor Hey	31	1	28	1	3	0
4	DF	(Ukraine) UKR	Anton Kravchenko	17	1	15	1	2	0
5	DF	(Serbia) SRB	Lazar Ćirković	28	1	28	1	0	0
14	DF	(Hungary) HUN	Péter Králik	1	0	0	0	1	0
18	DF	(Ukraine) UKR	Bohdan Melnyk	34	3	32	3	2	0
19	DF	(Albania) ALB	Herdi Prenga	28	1	27	1	1	0
25	DF	(Brazil) BRA	Matheus Leoni	29	3	27	3	2	0
33	DF	(Hungary) HUN	Tamás Rubus	3	0	1	0	2	0
71	DF	(Romania) ROU	Andrei Peteleu	21	0	19	0	2	0
Midfielders
6	MF	(Hungary) HUN	Bence Ötvös	33	0	30	0	3	0
8	MF	(Bulgaria) BUL	Yanis Karabelyov	30	2	27	2	3	0
9	MF	(Poland) POL	Rafał Makowski	15	0	14	0	1	0
10	MF	(Romania) ROU	Claudiu Bumba	30	11	30	11	0	0
13	MF	(Serbia) SRB	Lazar Zličić	28	3	25	1	3	2
21	MF	(Hungary) HUN	András Gosztonyi	10	0	7	0	3	0
45	MF	(Serbia) SRB	Slobodan Simović	14	0	13	0	1	0
70	MF	(Hungary) HUN	Levente Szőr	0	0	0	0	0	0
88	MF	(Hungary) HUN	Erik Czérna	8	0	6	0	2	0
Forwards
7	FW	(Montenegro) MNE	Driton Camaj	31	9	28	5	3	4
17	FW	(Albania) ALB	Jasir Asani	31	7	29	6	2	1
20	FW	(Czech Republic) CZE	Jaroslav Navrátil	33	6	32	6	1	0
26	FW	(Ukraine) UKR	Yaroslav Gelesh	0	0	0	0	0	0
27	FW	(Bosnia and Herzegovina) BIH	Jasmin Mešanović	34	8	32	8	2	0
67	FW	(Hungary) HUN	Mihály Nagy	13	0	10	0	3	0
77	FW	(Ukraine) UKR	Nikita Gonchar	0	0	0	0	0	0
Players transferred out during the season
11	MF	(Hungary) HUN	Lucas	5	0	4	0	1	0
23	FW	(Hungary) HUN	Richárd Jelena	0	0	0	0	0	0
99	GK	(Hungary) HUN	Márk Németh	0	0	0	-0	0	-0

Last updated: 16 May 2022
Source: Competitions

=== Top scorers ===
Includes all competitive matches. The list is sorted by shirt number when total goals are equal.

Last updated on 16 May 2022

Position	Nation	Number	Name	OTP Bank Liga	Hungarian Cup	Total
1	(Romania)	10	Claudiu Bumba	11	0	11
2	(Montenegro)	7	Driton Camaj	5	4	9
3	(Bosnia and Herzegovina)	27	Jasmin Mešanović	8	0	8
4	(Albania)	17	Jasir Asani	6	1	7
5	(Czech Republic)	20	Jaroslav Navrátil	6	0	6
6	(Brazil)	25	Matheus Leoni	3	0	3
6	(Ukraine)	18	Bohdan Melnyk	3	0	3
6	(Serbia)	13	Lazar Zličić	1	2	3
9	(Bulgaria)	8	Yanis Karabelyov	2	0	2
10	(Albania)	19	Herdi Prenga	1	0	1
10	(Serbia)	5	Lazar Ćirković	1	0	1
10	(Ukraine)	4	Anton Kravchenko	1	0	1
10	(Ukraine)	2	Viktor Hey	1	0	1
/	/	/	Own Goals	1	0	1
			TOTALS	50	7	57

=== Disciplinary record ===
Includes all competitive matches. Players with 1 card or more included only.

Last updated on 16 May 2022

Position	Nation	Number	Name	OTP Bank Liga		Hungarian Cup		Total (Hu Total)	
Position	Nation	Number	Name	Yellow card	Red card	Yellow card	Red card	Yellow card	Red card
DF	(Ukraine)	2	Viktor Hey	7	1	0	0	7 (7)	1 (1)
DF	(Ukraine)	4	Anton Kravchenko	6	1	0	0	6 (6)	1 (1)
DF	(Serbia)	5	Lazar Ćirković	5	0	0	0	5 (5)	0 (0)
MF	(Ukraine)	6	Bence Ötvös	7	1	0	0	7 (7)	1 (1)
FW	(Montenegro)	7	Driton Camaj	4	1	0	0	4 (4)	1 (1)
MF	(Bulgaria)	8	Yanis Karabelyov	7	0	0	0	7 (7)	0 (0)
MF	(Romania)	10	Claudiu Bumba	4	0	0	0	4 (4)	0 (0)
GK	(Ukraine)	12	Artem Odintsov	1	0	0	0	1 (1)	0 (0)
MF	(Serbia)	13	Lazar Zličić	6	0	0	0	6 (6)	0 (0)
DF	(Hungary)	14	Péter Králik	0	0	1	0	1 (0)	0 (0)
FW	(Albania)	17	Jasir Asani	2	0	0	0	2 (2)	0 (0)
DF	(Ukraine)	18	Bohdan Melnyk	3	1	0	0	3 (3)	1 (1)
DF	(Albania)	19	Herdi Prenga	5	1	0	0	5 (5)	1 (1)
FW	(Czech Republic)	20	Jaroslav Navrátil	4	0	1	0	5 (4)	0 (0)
MF	(Hungary)	21	András Gosztonyi	1	0	1	0	2 (1)	0 (0)
DF	(Brazil)	25	Matheus Leoni	6	1	0	0	6 (6)	1 (1)
FW	(Bosnia and Herzegovina)	27	Jasmin Mešanović	7	0	0	0	7 (7)	0 (0)
GK	(Hungary)	32	Dávid Dombó	2	0	0	0	2 (2)	0 (0)
MF	(Serbia)	45	Slobodan Simović	5	0	0	0	5 (5)	0 (0)
FW	(Hungary)	67	Mihály Nagy	1	0	0	0	1 (1)	0 (0)
DF	(Romania)	71	Andrei Peteleu	3	0	1	0	4 (3)	0 (0)
MF	(Hungary)	88	Erik Czérna	1	0	1	0	2 (1)	0 (0)
			TOTALS	87	7	5	0	92 (87)	7 (7)

=== Clean sheets ===
Last updated on 16 May 2022

Position	Nation	Number	Name	OTP Bank Liga	Hungarian Cup	Total
1	(Hungary)	32	Dávid Dombó	11	0	11
2	(Ukraine)	12	Artem Odintsov	3	1	4
3	(Ukraine)	99	Mykhaylo Hotra	0	0	0
4	(Ukraine)	80	Zden Perehanec	0	0	0
5	(Hungary)	99	Márk Németh	0	0	0
			TOTALS	14	1	15
