= 2020–21 Kisvárda FC season =

Kisvárda FC
2020–21 season
- Chairman: Attila Révész
- Manager: Attila Supka
- Stadium: Várkerti Stadion
Home colours	Away colours

The 2020–21 season was Kisvárda FC's 3rd season in the OTP Bank Liga and the 18th in existence as a football club.

== Transfers ==
=== Summer ===
In: Note: Flags indicate national team as defined under FIFA eligibility rules; some limited exceptions apply. Players may hold more than one non-FIFA nationality.

No.	Pos.	Nation	Player
3	MF	SRB	Lazar Zličić (from (Serbia) Voždovac)
9	FW	HUN	Zoltán Horváth (from Győr)
12	GK	UKR	Artem Odintsov (from Kisvárda U-19)
20	FW	CZE	Jaroslav Navrátil (from (Netherlands) Go Ahead Eagles)
26	DF	HUN	Csaba Lakatos (from Vasas)
27	DF	CRO	Niko Datković (from (Poland) Cracovia)
77	FW	MNE	Driton Camaj (from (Montenegro) Iskra Danilovgrad)

Out: Note: Flags indicate national team as defined under FIFA eligibility rules; some limited exceptions apply. Players may hold more than one non-FIFA nationality.

No.	Pos.	Nation	Player
2	DF	SRB	Radoš Protić (to (Serbia) Inđija)
9	FW	HUN	Patrik Tischler (to Debrecen)
12	FW	SRB	Nemanja Obradović
26	DF	GRE	Thodoris Berios (to (Cyprus) Nea Salamis)
31	GK	HUN	Illés Zöldesi (loan to Debrecen)

=== Winter ===
In: Note: Flags indicate national team as defined under FIFA eligibility rules; some limited exceptions apply. Players may hold more than one non-FIFA nationality.

No.	Pos.	Nation	Player
1	GK	HUN	Illés Zöldesi (loan return from Debrecen)
5	DF	SRB	Lazar Ćirković (from (Israel) Maccabi Netanya)
6	MF	HUN	Bence Ötvös (loan from Nyíregyháza)
8	MF	BUL	Yanis Karabelyov (from (Bulgaria) Slavia Sofia)
19	DF	ALB	Herdi Prenga (from (Latvia) Riga)
25	DF	BRA	Matheus Leoni (from (Bulgaria) Arda Kardzhali)
—	FW	UKR	Vasyl Khimich (from Kisvárda U-19)

Out: Note: Flags indicate national team as defined under FIFA eligibility rules; some limited exceptions apply. Players may hold more than one non-FIFA nationality.

No.	Pos.	Nation	Player
1	GK	HUN	Illés Zöldesi (loan to DEAC)
8	MF	GRE	Stavros Tsoukalas (to (Cyprus) Nea Salamis)
22	DF	HUN	Ádám Baranyai (to Csákvár)
26	DF	HUN	Csaba Lakatos (to Kaposvár)
27	DF	CRO	Niko Datković (to (Austria) Admira Wacker)
50	DF	CRO	Tonći Kukoč (to (Croatia) Opatija)
91	MF	UKR	Roman Karasyuk (to (Ukraine) Rukh Lviv)

=== Nemzeti Bajnokság I ===
==== League table ====
Pos	Team	Pld	W	D	L	GF	GA	GD	Pts	Qualification or relegation
3	Fehérvár	33	16	8	9	68	38	+30	56	Qualification for the Europa Conference League first qualifying round
4	Paks	33	14	8	11	76	64	+12	50	
5	Kisvárda	33	12	10	11	30	36	−6	46	
6	Újpest	33	12	6	15	46	67	−21	42	Qualification for the Europa Conference League second qualifying round (Note: Újpest qualified for the Europa Conference League second qualifying round as the 2020–21 Magyar Kupa winners.)
7	MTK	33	11	9	13	44	49	−5	42	

Source: Hungarian Football Federation (in Hungarian), Soccerway
Rules for classification: 1) Points; 2) Matches won; 3) Goal difference; 4) Goals scored; 5) Head-to-head points; 6) Head-to-head goal difference; 7) Head-to-head away goals scored; 8) Fair play ranking; 9) Drawing of lots.

==== Results summary ====
Overall								Home						Away					
Pld	W	D	L	GF	GA	GD	Pts	W	D	L	GF	GA	GD	W	D	L	GF	GA	GD
33	12	10	11	30	36	−6	46	5	6	5	14	14	0	7	4	6	16	22	−6

Last updated: 9 May 2021.
Source: NB1

==== Results by round ====
Round	1	2	3	4	5	6	7	8	9	10	11	12	13	14	15	16	17	18	19	20	21	22	23	24	25	26	27	28	29	30	31	32	33
Ground	A	H	A	A	H	A	H	A	H	A	H	H	A	H	H	A	H	A	H	A	H	A	A	H	A	A	H	A	H	A	H	A	H
Result	L	L	W	W	W	W	L	D	W	W	W	D	D	D	D	L	D	D	L	L	W	L	L	L	W	L	D	W	D	W	L	D	W
Position	10	12	9	5	3	3	3	3	2	2	2	2	2	3	3	3	3	3	5	7	5	6	7	8	7	8	8	7	6	5	6	5	5

Updated to match(es) played on 9 May 2021. Source: Matches
A = Away; H = Home; W = Win; D = Draw; L = Loss

==== Matches ====
17 August 2020 1	Budafok	2 – 1	Kisvárda	Budapest
19:00 CEST	Kovács 13'; Vaszicsku 80'	Report	Viana 17'	Stadium: Promontor utcai Stadion; Attendance: 2,000; Referee: Csaba Pintér

4 September 2020 2	Kisvárda	0 – 3	Puskás Akadémia	Kisvárda
20:00 CEST		Report	Plšek 30' (pen.); Komáromi 72'; Nagy 88'	Stadium: Várkerti Stadion; Attendance: 2,250; Referee: Gergő Bogár

30 August 2020 3	Budapest Honvéd	1 – 2	Kisvárda	Budapest
20:00 CEST	Tsoukalas 19' (o.g.)	Report	Tsoukalas 5'; Viana 17'	Stadium: Hidegkuti Nándor Stadion; Attendance: 2,183; Referee: Ádám Farkas

13 September 2020 4	Újpest	2 – 4	Kisvárda	Budapest
15:00 CEST	Perošević 28', 40'	Report	Bumba 11'; Simović 24'; Rubus 59'; Datković 64'	Stadium: Szusza Ferenc Stadion; Attendance: 1,410; Referee: Péter Solymosi

27 January 2021 5	Kisvárda	2 – 1	Fehérvár	Kisvárda
17:45 CET	Simović 22'; Sassá 58'	Report	Fiola 28'	Stadium: Várkerti Stadion; Attendance: 0 Referee: Sándor Andó-Szabó

3 October 2020 6	Mezőkövesd	1 – 2	Kisvárda	Mezőkövesd
17:00 CEST	Ene 90' (o.g.)	Report	Simović 5'; Navrátil 14'	Stadium: Mezőkövesdi Városi Stadion; Attendance: 1,520; Referee: Mihály Káprály

16 October 2020 7	Kisvárda	0 – 2	Ferencváros	Kisvárda
20:00 CEST		Report	Isael 67'; Karasyuk 89' (o.g.)	Stadium: Várkerti Stadion; Attendance: 3,122; Referee: Balázs Berke

24 October 2020 8	MTK Budapest	1 – 1	Kisvárda	Budapest
14:45 CET	Gera 24' (pen.)	Report	Kovácsréti 60'	Stadium: Hidegkuti Nándor Stadion; Attendance: 1,084; Referee: Péter Antal

1 November 2020 9	Kisvárda	1 – 0	Diósgyőr	Kisvárda
18:30 CET	Sassá 61'	Report		Stadium: Várkerti Stadion; Attendance: 1,723; Referee: Gergő Bogár

8 November 2020 10	Zalaegerszeg	1 – 2	Kisvárda	Zalaegerszeg
14:30 CET	Koszta 64'	Report	Viana 11' (pen.); Navrátil 52'	Stadium: ZTE Arena; Attendance: 815; Referee: Péter Solymosi

20 November 2020 11	Kisvárda	3 – 1	Paks	Kisvárda
20:30 CET	Bumba 16'; Navrátil 44'; Jelena 86'	Report	Rubus 30' (o.g.)	Stadium: Várkerti Stadion; Attendance: x Referee: Mihály Káprály

28 November 2020 12	Kisvárda	0 – 0	Budafok	Kisvárda
14:45 CET		Report		Stadium: Várkerti Stadion; Attendance: x Referee: Péter Zierkelbach

5 December 2020 13	Puskás Akadémia	0 – 0	Kisvárda	Felcsút
19:30 CET		Report		Stadium: Pancho Aréna; Attendance: x Referee: Péter Antal

12 December 2020 14	Kisvárda	0 – 0	Budapest Honvéd	Kisvárda
14:45 CET		Report		Stadium: Várkerti Stadion; Attendance: x Referee: Péter Solymosi

15 December 2020 15	Kisvárda	1 – 1	Újpest	Kisvárda
18:00 CET	Jelena 90+1'	Report	Szakály 85'	Stadium: Várkerti Stadion; Attendance: x Referee: Ádám Farkas

18 December 2020 16	Fehérvár	3 – 0	Kisvárda	Székesfehérvár
20:00 CET	Bamgboye 8', 87'; Petryak 46'	Report		Stadium: MOL Aréna Sóstó; Attendance: x Referee: Mihály Káprály

23 January 2021 17	Kisvárda	0 – 0	Mezőkövesd	Kisvárda
14:30 CET		Report		Stadium: Várkerti Stadion; Attendance: x Referee: Balázs Berke

30 January 2021 18	Ferencváros	1 – 1	Kisvárda	Budapest
17:00 CET	Uzuni 59'	Report	Jelena 40'	Stadium: Groupama Arena; Attendance: x Referee: Balázs Berke

2 February 2021 19	Kisvárda	0 – 2	MTK Budapest	Kisvárda
17:30 CET		Report	Schön 39'; Varga 52'	Stadium: Várkerti Stadion; Attendance: x Referee: Mihály Káprály

6 February 2021 20	Diósgyőr	2 – 0	Kisvárda	Miskolc
14:45 CET	Vaněček 10' (pen.); Hegedűs 40'	Report		Stadium: DVTK Stadion; Attendance: x Referee: Sándor Andó-Szabó

13 February 2021 21	Kisvárda	2 – 1	Zalaegerszeg	Kisvárda
17:00 CET	Bumba 25'; Horváth 90+4'	Report	Favorov 50'	Stadium: Várkerti Stadion; Attendance: x Referee: József Erdős

21 February 2021 22	Paks	3 – 0	Kisvárda	Paks
17:45 CET	Hahn 4'; Bognár 46'; Nagy 84'	Report		Stadium: Fehérvári úti Stadion; Attendance: x Referee: Péter Solymosi

27 February 2021 23	Budafok	2 – 0	Kisvárda	Budapest
14:45 CET	Ihrig-Farkas 69'; Kovács 70'	Report		Stadium: Promontor utcai Stadion; Attendance: x Referee: Mihály Káprály

2 March 2021 24	Kisvárda	0 – 1	Puskás Akadémia	Kisvárda
15:15 CET		Report	Knežević 39'	Stadium: Várkerti Stadion; Attendance: x Referee: Gergő Bogár

7 March 2021 25	Budapest Honvéd	0 – 1	Kisvárda	Budapest
16:00 CET		Report	Navrátil 90+2'	Stadium: Hidegkuti Nándor Stadion; Attendance: x Referee: Sándor Andó-Szabó

13 March 2021 26	Újpest	3 – 0	Kisvárda	Budapest
14:45 CET	Beridze 11', 35'; Croizet 14'	Report		Stadium: Szusza Ferenc Stadion; Attendance: x Referee: József Erdős

4 April 2021 27	Kisvárda	0 – 0	Fehérvár	Kisvárda
14:30 CET		Report		Stadium: Várkerti Stadion; Attendance: x Referee: Csaba Pintér

9 April 2021 28	Mezőkövesd	0 – 1	Kisvárda	Mezőkövesd
20:00 CET		Report	Bumba 20' (pen.)	Stadium: Mezőkövesdi Városi Stadion; Attendance: x Referee: Zoltán Iványi

17 April 2021 29	Kisvárda	0 – 0	Ferencváros	Kisvárda
17:00 CET		Report		Stadium: Várkerti Stadion; Attendance: x Referee: Csaba Pintér

21 April 2021 30	MTK Budapest	0 – 1	Kisvárda	Budapest
15:15 CET		Report	Ćirković 24'	Stadium: Hidegkuti Nándor Stadion; Attendance: x Referee: Ádám Pillók

24 April 2021 31	Kisvárda	0 – 1	Diósgyőr	Kisvárda
17:00 CEST		Report	Grozav 63'	Stadium: Várkerti Stadion; Attendance: x Referee: Balázs Berke

1 May 2021 32	Zalaegerszeg	0 – 0	Kisvárda	Zalaegerszeg
17:00 CEST		Report		Stadium: ZTE Arena; Attendance: 975; Referee: Tamás Bognár

9 May 2021 33	Kisvárda	5 – 1	Paks	Kisvárda
17:30 CEST	Viana 8'; Melnyk 13'; Ötvös 34'; Leoni 45'; Camaj 86'	Report	Haraszti 67' (pen.)	Stadium: Várkerti Stadion; Attendance: 1,850; Referee: Gergő Bogár

=== Hungarian Cup ===
19 September 2020 Round 6	Kecskéd	0 – 10	Kisvárda	Kecskéd
15:00 CEST		Report	Simović 5'; Horváth 10'; Bumba 11', 82', 90'; Camaj 31'; Kovácsréti 54', 73'; Fábián 56' (o.g.); Sassá 85'	Stadium: Városi Sportpálya; Referee: Árpád Jakab

28 October 2020 Round 7	Kecskemét	0 – 1	Kisvárda	Kecskemét
13:00 CET		Report	Horváth 35'	Stadium: Széktói Stadion; Attendance: 400; Referee: Péter Gál

10 February 2021 Round of 32	Soroksár	1 – 2	Kisvárda	Budapest
13:00 CET	Pászka 7'	Report	Ötvös 16'; Horváth 26'	Stadium: Szamosi Mihály Sportelep; Attendance: x Referee: Tamás Takács

24 February 2021 Round of 16	Szombathelyi Haladás	0 – 1	Kisvárda	Szombathely
17:00 CET		Report	Navrátil 24'	Stadium: Haladás Sportkomplexum; Attendance: x Referee: Mihály Káprály

10 March 2021 Quarter-final	Kisvárda	6 – 1	Zalaegerszeg	Kisvárda
15:00 CET	Ćirković 15'; Karabelyov 21'; Camaj 54', 74'; Viana 59'; Kovácsréti 89'	Report	Papp 78'	Stadium: Várkerti Stadion; Attendance: x Referee: István Vad

14 April 2021 Semi-final	Kisvárda	0 – 1	Újpest	Kisvárda
17:30 CET		Report	Beridze 54'	Stadium: Várkerti Stadion; Attendance: x Referee: Gergő Bogár

== Statistics ==
=== Appearances and goals ===
Last updated on 9 May 2021.

No.	Pos	Nat	Player	Total		OTP Bank Liga		Hungarian Cup	
No.	Pos	Nat	Player	Apps	Goals	Apps	Goals	Apps	Goals
1	GK	(Romania) ROU	Mihai Mincă	6	-5	3	-4	3	-1
3	DF	(Serbia) SRB	Lazar Zličić	25	0	20	0	5	0
4	DF	(Ukraine) UKR	Anton Kravchenko	9	0	7	0	2	0
5	DF	(Serbia) SRB	Lazar Ćirković	18	2	15	1	3	1
6	MF	(Hungary) HUN	Bence Ötvös	17	2	14	1	3	1
7	FW	(Brazil) BRA	Sassá	36	3	32	2	4	1
8	MF	(Bulgaria) BUL	Yanis Karabelyov	21	1	17	0	4	1
9	FW	(Hungary) HUN	Zoltán Horváth	25	4	19	1	6	3
10	MF	(Romania) ROU	Claudiu Bumba	36	7	31	4	5	3
11	MF	(Brazil) BRA	Lucas	22	0	19	0	3	0
14	DF	(Romania) ROU	Cornel Ene	20	0	17	0	3	0
17	DF	(Ukraine) UKR	Vasyl Khimich	2	0	1	0	1	0
18	MF	(Ukraine) UKR	Bohdan Melnyk	32	1	29	1	3	0
19	FW	(Brazil) BRA	Fernando Viana	29	5	27	4	2	1
20	FW	(Czech Republic) CZE	Jaroslav Navrátil	33	5	28	4	5	1
23	FW	(Hungary) HUN	Márk Kovácsréti	32	4	26	1	6	3
25	DF	(Brazil) BRA	Matheus Leoni	21	1	17	1	4	0
30	MF	(Ukraine) UKR	Viktor Hey	34	0	29	0	5	0
32	GK	(Hungary) HUN	Dávid Dombó	33	-34	30	-32	3	-2
33	DF	(Hungary) HUN	Tamás Rubus	16	1	14	1	2	0
34	FW	(Hungary) HUN	Richárd Jelena	19	3	15	3	4	0
39	DF	(Albania) ALB	Herdi Prenga	11	0	10	0	1	0
45	MF	(Serbia) SRB	Slobodan Simović	22	4	19	3	3	1
77	FW	(Montenegro) MNE	Driton Camaj	27	4	22	1	5	3
Youth players:
12	GK	(Ukraine) UKR	Artem Odyntsov	1	0	1	-0	0	-0
70	MF	(Hungary) HUN	Levente Szőr	1	0	1	0	0	0
Players no longer at the club:
8	MF	(Greece) GRE	Stavros Tsoukalas	14	1	13	1	1	0
22	DF	(Hungary) HUN	Ádám Baranyai	3	0	2	0	1	0
26	DF	(Hungary) HUN	Csaba Lakatos	0	0	0	0	0	0
27	DF	(Croatia) CRO	Niko Datković	8	1	7	1	1	0
50	DF	(Croatia) CRO	Tonći Kukoč	3	0	2	0	1	0
91	MF	(Ukraine) UKR	Roman Karasyuk	11	0	9	0	2	0

=== Top scorers ===
Includes all competitive matches. The list is sorted by shirt number when total goals are equal.

Last updated on 9 May 2021

Position	Nation	Number	Name	OTP Bank Liga	Hungarian Cup	Total
1	(Romania)	10	Claudiu Bumba	4	3	7
2	(Czech Republic)	20	Jaroslav Navrátil	4	1	5
3	(Brazil)	19	Fernando Viana	4	1	5
4	(Serbia)	45	Slobodan Simović	3	1	4
5	(Hungary)	9	Zoltán Horváth	1	3	4
6	(Hungary)	23	Márk Kovácsréti	1	3	4
7	(Montenegro)	77	Driton Camaj	1	3	4
8	(Hungary)	34	Richárd Jelena	3	0	3
9	(Brazil)	7	Sassá	2	1	3
10	(Serbia)	5	Lazar Ćirković	1	1	2
11	(Hungary)	6	Bence Ötvös	1	1	2
12	(Greece)	8	Stavros Tsoukalas	1	0	1
13	(Hungary)	33	Tamás Rubus	1	0	1
14	(Croatia)	27	Niko Datković	1	0	1
15	(Ukraine)	18	Bohdan Melnyk	1	0	1
16	(Brazil)	25	Matheus Leoni	1	0	1
17	(Bulgaria)	8	Yanis Karabelyov	0	1	1
/	/	/	Own Goals	0	1	1
			TOTALS	30	20	50

=== Disciplinary record ===
Includes all competitive matches. Players with 1 card or more included only.

Last updated on 9 May 2021

Position	Nation	Number	Name	OTP Bank Liga		Hungarian Cup		Total (Hu Total)	
Position	Nation	Number	Name	Booked	Sent off (straight red)	Booked	Sent off (straight red)	Booked	Sent off (straight red)
GK	(Romania)	1	Mihai Mincă	1	0	0	0	1 (1)	0 (0)
DF	(Serbia)	3	Lazar Zličić	2	0	2	0	4 (2)	0 (0)
DF	(Serbia)	5	Lazar Ćirković	2	0	1	0	3 (2)	0 (0)
MF	(Hungary)	6	Bence Ötvös	2	0	0	0	2 (2)	0 (0)
FW	(Brazil)	7	Sassá	3	0	0	0	3 (3)	0 (0)
MF	(Bulgaria)	8	Yanis Karabelyov	1	0	1	0	2 (1)	0 (0)
MF	(Greece)	8	Stavros Tsoukalas	1	0	0	0	1 (1)	0 (0)
FW	(Hungary)	9	Zoltán Horváth	1	0	0	0	1 (1)	0 (0)
MF	(Romania)	10	Claudiu Bumba	4	0	0	0	4 (4)	0 (0)
MF	(Brazil)	11	Lucas	5	0	0	0	5 (5)	0 (0)
DF	(Romania)	14	Cornel Ene	4	1	1	0	5 (4)	1 (1)
DF	(Ukraine)	17	Vasyl Khimich	1	0	0	0	1 (1)	0 (0)
MF	(Ukraine)	18	Bohdan Melnyk	4	0	1	0	5 (4)	0 (0)
FW	(Brazil)	19	Fernando Viana	4	1	0	0	4 (4)	1 (1)
FW	(Czech Republic)	20	Jaroslav Navrátil	2	0	0	0	2 (2)	0 (0)
DF	(Hungary)	22	Ádám Baranyai	0	0	1	0	1 (0)	0 (0)
DF	(Brazil)	25	Matheus Leoni	4	0	1	0	5 (4)	0 (0)
DF	(Croatia)	27	Niko Datković	5	0	0	0	5 (5)	0 (0)
MF	(Ukraine)	30	Viktor Hey	8	1	0	0	8 (8)	1 (1)
GK	(Hungary)	32	Dávid Dombó	1	0	0	0	1 (1)	0 (0)
DF	(Hungary)	33	Tamás Rubus	3	0	0	0	3 (3)	0 (0)
FW	(Hungary)	34	Richárd Jelena	1	0	0	0	1 (1)	0 (0)
DF	(Albania)	39	Herdi Prenga	3	0	0	0	3 (3)	0 (0)
MF	(Serbia)	45	Slobodan Simović	3	0	0	0	3 (3)	0 (0)
FW	(Montenegro)	77	Driton Camaj	1	0	1	0	2 (1)	0 (0)
			TOTALS	66	3	9	0	75 (66)	3 (3)

=== Overall ===
Games played	39 (33 OTP Bank Liga and 6 Hungarian Cup)
Games won	17 (12 OTP Bank Liga and 5 Hungarian Cup)
Games drawn	10 (10 OTP Bank Liga and 0 Hungarian Cup)
Games lost	12 (11 OTP Bank Liga and 1 Hungarian Cup)
Goals scored	50
Goals conceded	39
Goal difference	+11
Yellow cards	75
Red cards	3
Worst discipline	(Ukraine) Viktor Hey (8 (yellow card) , 1 (red card) )
Best result	10–0 (A) v Kecskéd - Hungarian Cup - 19-09-2020
Worst result	0–3 (H) v Puskás Akadémia - Nemzeti Bajnokság I - 04-09-2020
Worst result	0–3 (A) v Fehérvár - Nemzeti Bajnokság I - 18-12-2020
Worst result	0–3 (A) v Paks - Nemzeti Bajnokság I - 21-02-2021
Most appearances	(Romania) Claudiu Bumba (36 appearances)
Top scorer	(Romania) Claudiu Bumba (7 goals)
Points	61/117 (52.13%)

Last updated: 9 May 2021
