= 2012–13 FC Steaua București season =

Steaua Bucharest
2012–13 season
- Owner: George Becali
- President: Valeriu Argăseală
- Head coach: Laurențiu Reghecampf
- Stadium: Arena Națională; Stadionul Steaua
- Liga I: 1st (champions)
- Cupa României: Round of 16
- Europa League: Round of 16
- Top goalscorer: League: Raul Rusescu (21); All: Raul Rusescu (26)
- Highest home attendance: 50,445 vs Stuttgart (22 November 2012)
- Average home league attendance: 20,579
Home colours	Away colours

The 2012–13 season was the 65th season in the existence of FC Steaua București and the club's 65th consecutive season in the top flight of Romanian football. In addition to the domestic league, Steaua București participated in this season's edition of the Cupa României and the UEFA Europa League.

== Previous season positions ==
	Competition	Position
(European Union)	UEFA Europa League	Round of 32
(Romania)	Liga I	3rd
(Romania)	Cupa României	Round of 16
(Romania)	Supercupa României	Runners-up

== Players ==
=== Squad information ===
N	Pos.	Nat.	Name	Age	EU	Since	App	Goals	Ends	Transfer fee	Notes
1	GK	(Romania)	Stanca	33	EU	2011	9	0	Undisclosed	Undisclosed	
2	RB	(Romania)	G. Matei	23	EU	2011	4	0	Undisclosed	€0.7M	
2	RB	(Romania)	Râpă	23	EU	2013	0	0	Undisclosed	€0.1M	
3	CB	(Romania)	Bratu	24	EU	2012	0	0	Undisclosed	Free	
4	CB	(Germany) (Poland)	Szukała	29	EU	2012	0	0	Undisclosed	Undisclosed	
5	DM	(Romania)	Pintilii	28	EU	2012	0	0	2016	€0.6M	
6	CB	(Romania)	Gardoș	23	EU	2010	31	0	Undisclosed	Undisclosed	Also plays as DM
7	AM	(Romania)	Chipciu	24	EU	2012	14	2	2017	Undisclosed	
8	DM	(Romania)	Filip	22	EU	2009	2	0	Undisclosed	Youth system	
9	FW	(Romania)	M. Costea	25	EU	2011	22	6	Undisclosed	€1.4M	40% of next sale will go to Universitatea Craiova
10	AM	(Romania)	Tănase	26	EU	2009	78	6	2014	€1.8M	Also plays as LW, RW and CM; 50% of next sale will go to Argeș Pitești
11	CM	(Romania)	Prepeliță	27	EU	2011	11	0	2015	Free	
12	GK	(Romania)	Tătărușanu	27	EU	2008	77	0	2013	€1.5M	
14	LB	(Romania)	Latovlevici	27	EU	2010	49	1	2015	Undisclosed	
17	RB	(Australia) (North Macedonia)	Georgievski	25	Non-EU	2012	0	0	Undisclosed	Free	
19	LB	(Romania)	Lupu	22	EU	2011	2	0	Undisclosed	Youth system	
20	FW	(Brazil)	Tatu	31	Non-EU	2013	28	3	Undisclosed	Free	
21	CB	(Romania)	Chiricheș	23	EU	2012	14	0	Undisclosed	Undisclosed	
22	LW	(Romania)	Pârvulescu	24	EU	2012	13	1	2017	Undisclosed	
24	FW	(Romania)	Rusescu	24	EU	2011	31	13	Undisclosed	Undisclosed	
25	DM	(Romania)	Pușcaș	19	EU	2012	0	0	Undisclosed	Youth system	
27	RW	(Romania)	Năstăsie	21	EU	2011	4	0	Undisclosed	Youth system	
28	RW	(Romania)	Roșu	19	EU	2011	1	0	Undisclosed	Youth system	
55	DM	(Romania)	Bourceanu	28	EU	2011	31	0	2014	€0.7M	
77	RW	(Romania)	Ad. Popa	24	EU	2012	0	0	Undisclosed	€0.4M	
80	AM	(Romania)	Iancu	18	EU	2013	0	0	Undisclosed	Undisclosed	
90	FW	(Montenegro)	Nikolić	23	Non-EU	2012	20	2	Undisclosed	Undisclosed	
95	GK	(Romania)	Cojocaru	17	EU	2011	0	0	Undisclosed	Youth system	
99	FW	(Brazil)	Rocha	27	Non-EU	2012	0	0	Undisclosed	Free	
Players from YS
—	GK	(Romania)	Vârtej	18	EU	2013	0	0	Undisclosed	Youth system	
Players sold or loaned out during the season
18	CB	(Serbia)	Martinović	28	Non-EU	2010	27	5	2013	Undisclosed	Also plays as RB
19	LB	(Romania)	Lupu	22	EU	2011	2	0	Undisclosed	Youth system	
23	RB	(Romania)	Dumitraș	25	EU	2012	0	0	Undisclosed	Undisclosed	
27	RW	(Romania)	Năstăsie	21	EU	2011	4	0	Undisclosed	Youth system	
29	FW	(Romania)	F. Costea	28	EU	2011	18	1	2015	Free	
30	RW	(Romania)	T. Bălan	32	EU	2011	16	2	Undisclosed	Free	
31	FW	(Brazil)	Machado	23	Non-EU	2012	3	0	Undisclosed	€0.2M + D. Popa	

- Last updated: 15 January 2013 (UTC)
- Source: Steaua News

=== Transfers ===
==== In ====
No.	Pos.	Nat.	Name	Age	EU	Moving from	Type	Transfer window	Ends	Transfer fee	Source
90	FW	(Montenegro)	Nikolić	22	Non-EU	Politehnica Timișoara	Transfer	Summer	Undisclosed	Undisclosed	
5	DM	(Romania)	Pintilii	27	EU	Pandurii Târgu Jiu	Transfer	Summer	2016	€0.6M	
8	DM	(Romania)	Filip	21	EU	Concordia Chiajna	Loan return^{1}	Summer	Undisclosed	—	
23	RB	(Romania)	Dumitraș	24	EU	Ceahlăul Piatra Neamț	Transfer	Summer	Undisclosed	Undisclosed	
25	DM	(Romania)	Pușcaș	18	EU	Youth system	Promoted	Summer	Undisclosed	Youth system	
99	FW	(Brazil)	Rocha	26	Non-EU	Concordia Chiajna	Free transfer	Summer	Undisclosed	Free	
3	CB	(Romania)	Bratu	23	EU	Concordia Chiajna	Free transfer	Summer	Undisclosed	Free	
17	RB	(Australia) (North Macedonia)	Georgievski	24	Non-EU	Šibenik (Croatia)	Free transfer	Summer	Undisclosed	Free	
77	RW	(Romania)	Ad. Popa	24	EU	Concordia Chiajna	Transfer	Summer	Undisclosed	€0.4M	
4	CB	(Germany) (Poland)	Szukała	28	EU	Petrolul Ploiești	Transfer	Summer	2012	Undisclosed	
80	AM	(Romania)	Iancu	18	EU	Viitorul Constanța	Transfer	Winter	Undisclosed	Undisclosed	FCSB
19	LB	(Romania)	Lupu	21	EU	Universitatea Cluj	Loan return	Winter	Undisclosed	—	
27	RW	(Romania)	Năstăsie	21	EU	Universitatea Cluj	Loan return	Winter	Undisclosed	—	
20	FW	(Brazil)	Tatu	30	Non-EU	Steaua București	Free transfer	Winter	Undisclosed	Free	
2	RB	(Romania)	Râpă	23	EU	Oțelul Galați	Transfer	Winter	Undisclosed	€0.1M	

Notes

- ^1 On 2009–10 season, Steaua's coach dismiss Filip and sent him to second team, from here was loaned to Unirea Urziceni, Snagov and Concordia Chiajna, in June 2012 he returned to first team after in 2011 second team was dissolved.

==== Out ====
No.	Pos.	Nat.	Name	Age	EU	Moving to	Type	Transfer window	Transfer fee	Source
—	DM	(Romania)	Onicaș	22	EU	Viitorul Constanța	Loan extended	Summer	Undisclosed	
3	CB	(Bulgaria)	Iliev	31	EU	Volyn Lutsk (Ukraine)	End of contract	Summer	Free	
8	AM	(Romania)	Răduț	22	EU	Pandurii Târgu Jiu	Loan	Summer	—	
20	RB	(Romania)	Dănănae	26	EU	Turnu Severin	Mutual termination	Summer	Free	
23	CB	(Portugal)	Geraldo	31	EU	Petrolul Ploiești	End of contract	Summer	Free	
26	CM	(Romania)	Bicfalvi	24	EU	Volyn Lutsk (Ukraine)	End of contract	Summer	Free	
77	FW	(Brazil)	L. Tatu	30	Non-EU	Steaua București	End of contract	Summer	Free	
90	FW	(Montenegro)	Nikolić	22	Non-EU	Politehnica Timișoara	End of loan	Summer	—	
19	LB	(Romania)	Lupu	21	EU	Universitatea Cluj	Loan	Summer	—	
27	RW	(Romania)	Năstăsie	20	EU	Universitatea Cluj	Loan	Summer	—	
29	FW	(Romania)	F. Costea	27	EU	Turnu Severin	Mutual termination	Summer	—	
23	RB	(Romania)	Dumitraș	24	EU	Ceahlăul Piatra Neamț	Transfer	Winter	Undisclosed	
31	FW	(Brazil)	Machado	23	Non-EU	Rayo Vallecano (Spain)	Mutual termination	Winter	Free	
30	RW	(Romania)	T. Bălan	31	EU	Rapid București	Mutual termination	Winter	Free	
18	CB	(Serbia)	Martinović	27	Non-EU	Wuhan Zall (China)	Mutual termination	Winter	Free	

== Statistics ==
=== Goalscorers ===
Player	Liga I	Cupa României	Europa League	Fixture Total	Friendlies	Total
(Romania) Raul Rusescu	21	0	5	26	4	30
(Brazil) Adi Rocha	9	0	3	12	4	16
(Romania) Alexandru Chipciu	6	0	2	8	2	10
(Romania) Cristian Tănase	7	0	0	7	3	10
(Montenegro) Stefan Nikolić	5	1	1	7	3	10
(Romania) Mihai Costea	2	2	1	5	2	7
(Romania) Mihai Pintilii	5	0	0	5	2	7
(Romania) Vlad Chiricheș	1	0	3	4	0	4
(Romania) Iasmin Latovlevici	2	0	2	4	0	4
(Poland) Łukasz Szukała	4	0	0	4	0	4
(Brazil) Leandro Tatu	2	0	0	2	2	4
(Serbia) Novak Martinović	1	0	1	2	1	3
(Romania) Adrian Popa	1	0	1	2	1	3
(Romania) Gabriel Iancu	2	0	0	2	1	3
(Romania) Alexandru Bourceanu	2	0	0	2	0	2
(Romania) Florin Gardoș	1	0	0	1	1	2
(Romania) Andrei Dumitraș	0	0	1	1	1	2
(Romania) Andrei Prepeliță	1	0	0	1	0	1
(Romania) Florin Costea	0	0	0	0	2	2
(Romania) Lucian Filip	0	0	0	0	1	1
(Romania) Paul Pârvulescu	0	0	0	0	1	1
Own goals
(Romania) Octavian Abrudan	1	0	0	1	0	1
(Senegal) Boubacar Mansaly	1	0	0	1	0	1
(Iceland) Ragnar Sigurðsson	0	0	1	1	0	1

== Competitions ==
=== Overall ===
Competition	Started round	Current position / round	Final position / round	First match	Last match
Liga I	—	—	Champions	23 July 2012	28 May 2013
Cupa României	Round of 32	—	Round of 16	27 September 2012	31 October 2012
Europa League	Third qualifying round	—	Round of 16	2 August 2012	14 March 2013

=== Liga I ===
==== League table ====
Pos	Team	Pld	W	D	L	GF	GA	GD	Pts	Qualification or relegation
1	Steaua București (C)	34	24	7	3	74	29	+45	79	Qualification to Champions League second qualifying round
2	Pandurii Târgu Jiu	34	19	6	9	57	43	+14	63	Qualification to Europa League second qualifying round
3	Petrolul Ploiești	34	16	14	4	60	34	+26	62	Qualification to Europa League second qualifying round
4	Astra Giurgiu	34	17	9	8	64	37	+27	60	Qualification to Europa League first qualifying round (Note: Astra Giurgiu qualified for the first qualifying round of the 2013–14 UEFA Europa as Petrolul won the 2012–13 Cupa României and secured a place in the second qualifying round of the 2013–14 UEFA Europa.)
5	Vaslui	34	16	10	8	50	34	+16	58	

Source: Liga I (in Romanian)
Rules for classification: 1) points; 2) head-to-head points; 3) head-to-head goal difference; 4) head-to-head goals scored; 5) goal difference; 6) number of goals scored.
(C) Champions

==== Results summary ====
Overall								Home						Away					
Pld	W	D	L	GF	GA	GD	Pts	W	D	L	GF	GA	GD	W	D	L	GF	GA	GD
34	24	7	3	74	29	+45	79	15	1	1	41	12	+29	9	6	2	33	17	+16

Source: LT

==== Results by round ====
Round	1	2	3	4	5	6	7	8	9	10	11	12	13	14	15	16	17	18	19	20	21	22	23	24	25	26	27	28	29	30	31	32	33	34
Ground	H	A	H	A	H	A	H	A	H	A	H	A	H	H	A	H	A	A	H	A	H	A	H	A	H	A	H	A	H	A	A	H	A	H
Result	W	W	W	D	W	L	W	W	W	W	W	D	W	W	W	W	L	W	W	W	W	W	W	D	W	D	D	D	W	W	W	L	D	W
Position	5	3	2	2	1	2	2	1	1	1	1	1	1	1	1	1	1	1	1	1	1	1	1	1	1	1	1	1	1	1	1	1	1	1

Source: Matches
A = Away; H = Home; W = Win; D = Draw; L = Loss

==== Points by opponent ====
Team	Results		Points
Team	Home	Away	Points
Astra Giurgiu	2–0	4–3	6
Brașov	4–0	1–3	3
Ceahlăul Piatra Neamț	3–0	4–3	6
CFR Cluj	1–0	0–0	4
Concordia Chiajna	1–0	6–0	6
Dinamo București	3–1	2–0	6
Gaz Metan Mediaș	3–0	1–1	4
Gloria Bistrița	4–0	1–0	6
Oțelul Galați	2–1	1–1	4
Pandurii Târgu Jiu	2–0	0–0	4
Petrolul Ploiești	2–2	2–1	4
Rapid București	1–0	1–1	4
Studențesc Iași	3–1	3–0	6
Turnu Severin	2–1	1–1	4
Universitatea Cluj	5–1	1–0	6
Vaslui	1–0	1–3	3
Viitorul Constanța	2–5	4–0	3

==== Matches ====
23 July 2012 Round 1	Steaua București	1–0	Concordia Chiajna	Bucharest
21:30	Rusescu 49'			Stadium: Steaua; Attendance: 15,636; Referee: Robert Dumitru

28 July 2012 Round 2	Astra Giurgiu	3–4	Steaua București	Ploiești
21:15	Enache 12', 38'; Morais 48'		19' Tănase; 21' Martinović; 62' Rusescu; 67' Rocha	Stadium: Astra; Referee: Sebastian Colțescu

5 August 2012 Round 3	Steaua București	5–1	Universitatea Cluj	Bucharest
21:30	Rocha 16', 60'; Rusescu 62'; Tănase 71' (pen.), 84'		81' Dinu	Stadium: Arena Națională; Attendance: 14,370; Referee: Iulian Dima

12 August 2012 Round 4	Gaz Metan Mediaș	1–1	Steaua București	Mediaș
21:30	Astafei 36'		79' Rusescu	Stadium: Gaz Metan; Referee: Alexandru Tudor

19 August 2012 Round 5	Steaua București	3–0	Ceahlăul Piatra Neamț	Bucharest
22:00	Rusescu 11', 59'; Rocha 33'			Stadium: Steaua; Referee: Adrian Cojocaru

27 August 2012 Round 6	Vaslui	3–1	Steaua București	Vaslui
21:30	Celeban 58'; L. Sânmărtean 83'; M. Niculae 88'		51' Chipciu	Stadium: Municipal; Referee: Paolo Valeri (Italy)

2 September 2012 Round 7	Steaua București	2–1	Oțelul Galați	Bucharest
18:55	Rocha 3'; Pintilii 8'		Viglianti 13'	Stadium: Steaua; Attendance: 12,320; Referee: Cătălin Popa

16 September 2012 Round 8	Studențesc Iași	0–3	Steaua București	Iași
21:30			18', 72' Chipciu; 71' Rocha	Stadium: Emil Alexandrescu; Referee: Sebastian Colțescu

24 September 2012 Round 9	Steaua București	1–0	Rapid București	Bucharest
20:30	Bourceanu 90+6'			Stadium: Arena Națională; Attendance: 42,876; Referee: Slavko Vinčić (Slovenia)

30 September 2012 Round 10	Petrolul Ploiești	1–2	Steaua București	Ploiești
21:30	Bokila 38'		45' Nikolić; 65' Latovlevici	Stadium: Ilie Oană; Referee: Marius Avram

7 October 2012 Round 11	Steaua București	1–0	CFR Cluj	Bucharest
20:30	Rusescu 75'			Stadium: Arena Națională; Attendance: 45,803; Referee: Mauro Bergonzi (Italy)

21 October 2012 Round 12	Pandurii Târgu Jiu	0–0	Steaua București	Târgu Jiu
21:30				Stadium: Tudor Vladimirescu; Referee: Alexandru Tudor

28 October 2012 Round 13	Steaua București	4–0	Gloria Bistrița	Bucharest
21:30	M. Costea 7', 29'; Rusescu 24', 84'			Stadium: Steaua; Referee: Iulian Dima

4 November 2012 Round 14	Steaua București	3–1	Dinamo București	Bucharest
21:30	Rusescu 63' (pen.), 83'; Szukała 87'		38' Alexe	Stadium: Arena Națională; Attendance: 49,112; Referee: Alexandre Boucaut (Belgium)

11 November 2012 Round 15	Viitorul Constanța	0–4	Steaua București	Constanța
21:30			2' Chipciu; 5' (pen.), 68' Rusescu; 27' Gardoș	Stadium: Farul; Referee: Adrian Cojocaru

18 November 2012 Round 16	Steaua București	2–1	Turnu Severin	Bucharest
20:30	Tănase 20'; Rusescu 27'		16' Vancea	Stadium: Steaua; Referee: Dragoș Teodor

26 November 2012 Round 17	Brașov	3–1	Steaua București	Brașov
20:30	Batin 15' (pen.); Păun 61'; Buga 85' (pen.)		24' (pen.), (penalty missed) 80' (pen.) Rusescu	Stadium: Silviu Ploeșteanu; Referee: Marius Avram

30 November 2012 Round 18	Concordia Chiajna	0–6	Steaua București	Chiajna
20:00			14' Chiricheș; 33', 41' Rusescu; 49' Nikolić; 55' Tănase; 76' Rocha	Stadium: Concordia; Referee: Radu Petrescu

10 December 2012 Round 19	Steaua București	2–0	Astra Giurgiu	Bucharest
20:30	Tănase 13'; Prepeliță 75'			Stadium: Steaua; Referee: Alexandru Tudor

25 February 2013 Round 20	Universitatea Cluj	0–1	Steaua București	Cluj
19:30			34' Rusescu	Stadium: Cluj Arena; Referee: Sebastian Colțescu

2 March 2013 Round 21	Steaua București	3–0	Gaz Metan Mediaș	Bucharest
19:15	Nikolić 33'; Pintilii 72', 88' (pen.)			Stadium: Arena Națională; Referee: István Kovacs

10 March 2013 Round 22	Ceahlăul Piatra Neamț	3–4	Steaua București	Piatra Neamț
20:30	Gheorghiu 8'; Golubović 35' (pen.); Constantinescu 90+1'		3' Bourceanu; 10' Rocha; 12' Pintilii; 60' Tatu	Stadium: Ceahlăul; Referee: Adrian Cojocaru

17 March 2013 Round 23	Steaua București	1–0	Vaslui	Bucharest
20:00	Chipciu 45'			Stadium: Arena Națională; Referee: Ivan Kružliak (Slovakia)

1 April 2013 Round 24	Oțelul Galați	1–1	Steaua București	Galați
21:30	Sârghi 90+4'		63' Szukała	Stadium: Oțelul; Referee: Alexandru Tudor

7 April 2013 Round 25	Steaua București	3–1	Studențesc Iași	Bucharest
21:30	Chipciu 45+2'; Pintilii 59'; Tatu 85'		15' (pen.) Cl. Tudor	Stadium: Steaua; Referee: George Rădulescu

14 April 2013 Round 26	Rapid București	1–1	Steaua București	Bucharest
20:30	Herea 10'		81' (o.g.) Abrudan	Stadium: Giulești-Valentin Stănescu; Referee: Sebastian Colțescu

22 April 2013 Round 27	Steaua București	2–2	Petrolul Ploiești	Bucharest
20:45	Rusescu 23' (pen.); Latovlevici 79' (pen.)		45+2' Hoban; 84' (o.g.) Chiricheș	Stadium: Arena Națională; Attendance: 35,480; Referee: Alexandru Tudor

28 April 2013 Round 28	CFR Cluj	0–0	Steaua București	Cluj
20:30				Stadium: Dr. Constantin Rădulescu; Referee: Ovidiu Hațegan

3 May 2013 Round 29	Steaua București	2–0	Pandurii Târgu Jiu	Bucharest
19:45	Rusescu 12'; Szukała 42'			Stadium: Arena Națională; Referee: Cristian Balaj

7 May 2013 Round 30	Gloria Bistrița	0–1	Steaua București	Bistrița
21:30			59' Iancu	Stadium: Jean Pădureanu; Referee: Cătălin Găman

10 May 2013 Round 31	Dinamo București	0–2	Steaua București	Bucharest
21:00			13' (o.g.) Boubacar; 69' Tănase	Stadium: Arena Națională; Attendance: 43,782; Referee: Sebastian Colțescu

19 May 2013 Round 32	Steaua București	2–5	Viitorul Constanța	Bucharest
20:30	Nikolić 37' (pen.); Rocha 57'		9', 38' Chițu; 34' (pen.) Dică; 41' Larie; 64' Nikolov; (penalty missed) 90+4' (pen.) Rusu	Stadium: Steaua; Referee: Iulian Dima

26 May 2013 Round 33	Turnu Severin	1–1	Steaua București	Drobeta-Turnu Severin
19:00	Roman 25'		90' Iancu	Stadium: Municipal; Referee: George Rădulescu

28 May 2013 Round 34	Steaua București	4–0	Brașov	Bucharest
18:00	Rusescu 2'; Szukała 7'; Nikolić 56'; Ad. Popa 87'			Stadium: Arena Națională; Attendance: 50,224; Referee: Marius Avram

=== Cupa României ===
==== Results ====
27 September 2012 Round of 32	Steaua București	3–1	Târgu Mureș	Bucharest
21:30	M. Costea 13' (pen.), 50'; Nikolić 47'	Report	40' Dîlbea	Stadium: Steaua; Referee: Lucian Rusandu

31 October 2012 Round of 16	Concordia Chiajna	0–0 (a.e.t.) (4–3 p)	Steaua București	Chiajna
21:30				Stadium: Concordia; Referee: Marian Balaci
	Penalties
	Pană (penalty scored); Ispir (penalty scored); Belu (penalty scored); Damian (penalty missed); Zuluf (penalty scored)		(penalty scored) Nikolić; (penalty scored) Pârvulescu; (penalty scored) Filip; (penalty missed) Chipciu; (penalty missed) Tănase

=== UEFA Europa League ===
==== Qualifying rounds ====
===== Third qualifying round =====
2 August 2012 First leg	Steaua București (Romania)	0–1	(Slovakia) Spartak Trnava	Bucharest, Romania
20:45			6' Mikovič	Stadium: Arena Națională; Referee: Kevin Blom (Netherlands)

9 August 2012 Second leg	Spartak Trnava (Slovakia)	0–3 (1–3 agg.)	(Romania) Steaua București	Trnava, Slovakia
20:30			8' Rocha; 77' Rusescu; 84' Nikolić	Stadium: Antona Malatinského; Referee: Yevhen Aranovskiy (Ukraine)

===== Play-off round =====
23 August 2012 First leg	Ekranas (Lithuania)	0–2	(Romania) Steaua București	Vilnius, Lithuania
19:45			36' Martinović; 76' Ad. Popa	Stadium: LFF; Referee: Aleksei Kulbakov (Belarus)

30 August 2012 Second leg	Steaua București (Romania)	3–0 (5–0 agg.)	(Lithuania) Ekranas	Bucharest, Romania
20:30	Rocha 21', 86'; Dumitraș 31'			Stadium: Steaua; Referee: Tony Asumaa (Finland)

==== Group stage ====
Group E standings
Pos	Team	Pld	W	D	L	GF	GA	GD	Pts	Qualification	STE	STU	COP	MOL
1	(Romania) Steaua București	6	3	2	1	9	9	0	11	Advance to knockout phase	—	1–5	1–0	2–0
2	(Germany) VfB Stuttgart	6	2	2	2	9	6	+3	8 (Note: Head-to-head points: VfB Stuttgart 4, Copenhagen 1.)	Advance to knockout phase	2–2	—	0–0	0–1
3	(Denmark) Copenhagen	6	2	2	2	5	6	−1	8		1–1	0–2	—	2–1
4	(Norway) Molde	6	2	0	4	6	8	−2	6		1–2	2–0	1–2	—

Source: Soccerway

===== Results =====
20 September 2012 Matchday 1	Stuttgart (Germany)	2–2	(Romania) Steaua București	Stuttgart, Germany
20:00	Ibišević 5'; Niedermeier 85'		6' Chipciu; 80' (pen.) Rusescu	Stadium: Mercedes-Benz Arena; Referee: Serge Gumienny (Belgium)

4 October 2012 Matchday 2	Steaua București (Romania)	1–0	(Denmark) København	Bucharest, Romania
22:05	Sigurðsson 83' (o.g.)			Stadium: Arena Națională; Attendance: 48,694; Referee: Antonio Damato (Italy)

25 October 2012 Matchday 3	Steaua București (Romania)	2–0	(Norway) Molde	Bucharest, Romania
22:05	Chiricheș 30'; Rusescu 32'; Tănase (penalty missed) 58' (pen.)			Stadium: Arena Națională; Attendance: 43,651; Referee: Laurent Duhamel (France)

8 November 2012 Matchday 4	Molde (Norway)	1–2	(Romania) Steaua București	Molde, Norway
20:00	Chima 56'		21' Chipciu; 37' Latovlevici	Stadium: Aker; Referee: István Vad (Hungary)

22 November 2012 Matchday 5	Steaua București (Romania)	1–5	(Germany) Stuttgart	Bucharest, Romania
22:05	M. Costea 83'		5' Tasci; 18' Harnik; 23' Sakai; 31', 55' Okazaki	Stadium: Arena Națională; Referee: Michael Koukoulakis (Greece)

6 December 2012 Matchday 6	København (Denmark)	1–1	(Romania) Steaua București	Copenhagen, Denmark
20:00	Vetokele 87'		73' Rusescu	Stadium: Parken; Referee: Hüseyin Göçek (Turkey)

==== Knockout phase ====
===== Round of 32 =====
14 February 2013 First leg	Ajax (Netherlands)	2–0	(Romania) Steaua București	Amsterdam, Netherlands
20:00	Alderweireld 28' van Rhijn 48'			Stadium: Amsterdam Arena; Attendance: 51,493; Referee: Stanislav Todorov (Bulgaria)

21 February 2013 Second leg	Steaua București (Romania)	2–0 (2–2 agg.) (4–2 p)	(Netherlands) Ajax	Bucharest, Romania
22:05	Latovlevici 38'; Chiricheș 76'			Stadium: Arena Națională; Referee: Paolo Tagliavento (Italy)
	Penalties
	Rusescu (penalty scored); Nikolić (penalty scored); Filip (penalty scored); Latovlevici (penalty scored)		(penalty scored) Eriksen; (penalty missed) Schöne; (penalty scored) de Jong; (penalty missed) Moisander

===== Round of 16 =====
7 March 2013 First leg	Steaua București (Romania)	1–0	(England) Chelsea	Bucharest, Romania
20:00	Rusescu 34' (pen.)			Stadium: Arena Națională; Referee: Sergei Karasev (Russia)

14 March 2013 Second leg	Chelsea (England)	3–1 (3–2 agg.)	(Romania) Steaua București	London, England
22:05	Mata 34'; Terry 58'; Torres 71', (penalty missed) 87' (pen.)		45+1' Chiricheș	Stadium: Stamford Bridge; Attendance: 28,817; Referee: Stéphane Lannoy (France)

=== Non competitive matches ===
Date	Team	Results			Steaua scorers
Date	Team	Home	Away	Neutral	Steaua scorers
20 June 2012	(Georgia (country)) Torpedo Kutaisi			1–1	35' Rusescu
23 June 2012	(Switzerland) Basel			4–2	14' Rusescu, 16' Rocha, 49' F. Costea, 64' Nikolić
30 June 2012	(Bulgaria) Lokomotiv Plovdiv			4–0	30' Rocha, 32' Martinović, 63' (pen.) Pintilii, 72' F. Costea
4 July 2012	(Austria) Red Bull Salzburg			2–3	23' Filip, 69' (pen.) Tănase
7 July 2012	(Georgia (country)) Zestaponi			0–0	
10 July 2012	(Germany) Aalen			2–1	5' Gardoș, 49' Rocha
15 July 2012	(Bulgaria) Litex Lovech	3–0			36' Dumitraș, 44' Chipciu, 65' M. Costea
8 September 2012	(Bulgaria) Ludogorets Razgrad		1–1		60' Rocha
15 January 2013	(Scotland) Celtic			1–2	13' Nikolić
18 January 2013	(Switzerland) Basel			1–1	80' Pintilii
21 January 2013	(Ukraine) Dynamo Kyiv			2–0	32' Rusescu, 64' Tănase
23 January 2013	(Hungary) Ferencváros			1–2	17' Chipciu
30 January 2013	(Azerbaijan) Gabala			0–1	
1 February 2013	(Austria) Sturm Graz			3–3	26' (pen.) Rusescu, 85' Pârvulescu, 86' Tănase
3 February 2013	(Russia) Dynamo Moscow			1–2	3' Tatu
5 February 2013	(Czech Republic) Mladá Boleslav			0–1	
7 February 2013	(Slovakia) Slovan Bratislava			3–1	14' Tatu, 58' Ad. Popa, 76' M. Costea
9 February 2013	(Czech Republic) Baumit Jablonec			1–1	70' Iancu
23 March 2013	(Romania) Brăila		0–1		

== UEFA Club rankings ==
This is the current UEFA Club Rankings, including season 2011–12.

Rank	Team	Points	Mvmnt
71	(Germany) Hertha	28.037	▼ (–1)
72	(Greece) PAOK	27.920	▲ (+37)
73	(England) Aston Villa	27.882	▼ (–4)
74	(Russia) Lokomotiv Moscow	27.066	▲ (+32)
75	(Italy) Sampdoria	26.996	▼ (–3)
76	(Romania) Steaua București	26.764	▼ (–9)
77	(France) Saint-Étienne	25.835	▼ (–2)
78	(Czech Republic) Sparta Prague	25.570	▼ (–13)
79	(Denmark) AaB Aalborg	25.005	▼ (–2)
80	(England) Stoke City	24.882	▲ (+316)
81	(Spain) Racing de Santander	24.837	▼ (–2)
