= 2015–16 Hapoel Tel Aviv F.C. season =

Hapoel Tel Aviv
2015–16 season
- Owners: Amir Gross Kabiri
- Coach: César Mendiondo (30 May 2015 - 3 September 2015); Eli Guttman
- Stadium: Bloomfield Stadium, Tel Aviv
- Ligat Ha'Al: 12th
- State Cup: Round of 16
- Toto Cup: Group stage (4th)
- Top goalscorer: League: Aaron Schoenfeld (8); All: Aaron Schoenfeld (8)
- Highest home attendance: League: 11,500 vs Bnei Yehuda Tel Aviv (30 September 2015)
Home colours	Away colours	Third colours

The 2015–16 season is Hapoel Tel Aviv Football Club's 92nd year in the Israeli Football, their 26th consecutive and 74th season in the Top Division in Israel.

== Season overview ==
Hapeol started the campaign with César Mendiondo but on 3 September after two games he was sacked. This left Walid Badir in charge until November 2015 with Hapoel appointing Guy Levy as the new coach. On 12 January 2016 it was confirmed that Eli Guttman would return to the club in the manager position after leaving his post as Israeli manager and that Guy Levy would work alongside him in a coaching role.

== Kit ==
Supplier: Puma / Sponsor: Fujitsu

goalkeeper

== Squad ==
Note: Flags indicate national team as defined under FIFA eligibility rules; some limited exceptions apply. Players may hold more than one non-FIFA nationality.

No.	Pos.	Nation	Player
1	GK	ISR	Ariel Harush
2	DF	ISR	Yom-Tov Ofer
3	DF	ISR	Guy Gomberg
4	DF	ISR	Gal Shish
5	DF	ISR	Iyad Abu Abaid
6	DF	ISR	Adi Gotlieb
7	MF	ROU	Claudiu Bumba
8	MF	ROU	Mihai Pintilii
9	MF	ISR	Ben Reichert
10	FW	ISR	Omri Altman
11	FW	ISR	Ramzi Safuri
12	FW	USA	Aaron Schoenfeld

No.	Pos.	Nation	Player
15	MF	ISR	Nir Lax
16	FW	ISR	Sagiv Yehezkel
18	DF	ISR	Samuel Scheimann
19	MF	BRA	Cauê (footballer, born 1989)
20	MF	GAM	Hamza Barry
22	GK	ISR	Tzlil Hatuka
23	MF	MNE	Nemanja Nikolić
24	DF	GRE	Loukas Vyntra
26	DF	ISR	Avihay Yadin
33	GK	ISR	David Alon
77	MF	ISR	Siraj Nassar

== Transfers ==
=== In ===
Date from	Pos.	Nationality	Player	From	Fee	Ref.
19 June 2015	MF	(Romania)	Claudiu Bumba	(Romania) ASA Târgu Mureș	€650,000	
19 June 2015	MF	(Romania)	Mihai Pintilii	(Saudi Arabia) Al Hilal	Free	
27 July 2015	DF	(Greece)	Loukas Vyntra	(Spain) Levante	€250,000	
5 August 2015	MF	(Israel)	Ben Reichert	(Israel) Maccabi Tel Aviv	€1,000,000	

=== Loaned in ===
Date from	Pos.	Nationality	Player	From	Date until	Ref.
3 February 2016	MF	(The Gambia)	Hamza Barry	(Greece) Apollon Limassol	End of season	

== Competitions ==
=== Ligat Ha'Al ===
==== Regular season ====
Pos	Team	Pld	W	D	L	GF	GA	GD	Pts	Qualification or relegation
10	Hapoel Acre	26	8	5	13	18	36	−18	29	Qualification for the relegation round
11	Ironi Kiryat Shmona	26	6	10	10	25	31	−6	28	Qualification for the relegation round
12	Hapoel Tel Aviv	26	6	9	11	17	31	−14	27	Qualification for the relegation round
13	Hapoel Haifa	26	5	10	11	27	37	−10	25	Qualification for the relegation round
14	Maccabi Netanya	26	1	8	17	10	37	−27	11	Qualification for the relegation round

Source: Israel Football Association, Soccerway
Rules for classification: 1) Points; 2) Goal difference; 3) Matches won; 4) Goals scored; 5) Head-to-head points; 6) Head-to-head goal difference; 7) Head-to-head goals scored; 8) Play-off.

==== Results ====
24 August 2015 1	Beitar Jerusalem	0–0	Hapoel Tel Aviv	Jerusalem
18:55				Stadium: Teddy Stadium; Attendance: 21,000

29 August 2015 2	Hapoel Tel Aviv	0–3	Ironi Kiryat Shmona	Tel Aviv
18:00				Stadium: Bloomfield Stadium; Attendance: 9,300

12 September 2015 3	Hapoel Tel Aviv	1–1	Maccabi Netanya	Tel Aviv
15:00				Stadium: Bloomfield Stadium; Attendance: 11,200

19 September 2015 4	Hapoel Haifa	0–1	Hapoel Tel Aviv	Haifa
15:45				Stadium: Sammy Ofer Stadium; Attendance: 4,500

28 September 2015 5	Hapoel Tel Aviv	3–1	Bnei Yehuda Tel Aviv	Tel Aviv
17:00				Stadium: Bloomfield Stadium; Attendance: 11,267

3 October 2015 6	Hapoel Kfar Saba	1–1	Hapoel Tel Aviv	Kfar Saba
15:00				Stadium: Levita Stadium; Attendance: 2,400

17 October 2015 7	Hapoel Tel Aviv	0–4	Bnei Sakhnin	Tel Aviv
15:45				Stadium: Bloomfield Stadium; Attendance: 8,024

25 October 2015 8	Hapoel Be'er Sheva	3–1	Hapoel Tel Aviv	Be'er Sheva
18:30				Stadium: Turner Stadium; Attendance: 14,000

31 October 2015 9	Hapoel Tel Aviv	0–1	Maccabi Tel Aviv	Tel Aviv
16:00				Stadium: Bloomfield Stadium; Attendance: 12,178

7 November 2015 10	Hapoel Ra'anana	0–1	Hapoel Tel Aviv	Ra'anana
15:00				Stadium: Karnei Oren Memorial Field; Attendance: 5,100

23 November 2015 11	Hapoel Tel Aviv	0–3	Maccabi Haifa	Tel Aviv
18:55				Stadium: Bloomfield Stadium; Attendance: 9,000

30 November 2015 12	Hapoel Acre	0–1	Hapoel Tel Aviv	Acre
18:30				Stadium: Acre Municipal Stadium; Attendance: 2,500

5 December 2015 13	Hapoel Tel Aviv	0–1	Maccabi Petah Tikva	Tel Aviv
13:30				Stadium: Bloomfield Stadium; Attendance: 9,000

12 December 2015 14	Hapoel Tel Aviv	0–0	Beitar Jerusalem	Tel Aviv
18:15				Stadium: Bloomfield Stadium; Attendance: 10,200

19 December 2015 15	Ironi Kiryat Shmona	3–0	Hapoel Tel Aviv	Kiryat Shmona
16:45				Stadium: Kiryat Shmona Municipal Stadium; Attendance: 1,400

26 December 2015 16	Maccabi Netanya	1–1	Hapoel Tel Aviv	Netanya
17:30				Stadium: Netanya Stadium; Attendance: 5,000

3 January 2016 17	Hapoel Tel Aviv	0–0	Hapoel Haifa	Tel Aviv
18:15				Stadium: Bloomfield Stadium; Attendance: 5,000

9 January 2016 18	Bnei Yehuda	1–3	Hapoel Tel Aviv	Tel Aviv
15:00				Stadium: Bloomfield Stadium; Attendance: 4,900

16 January 2016 19	Hapoel Tel Aviv	0–1	Hapoel Kfar Saba	Tel Aviv
15:00				Stadium: Bloomfield Stadium; Attendance: 10,200

23 January 2016 20	Bnei Sakhnin	1–0	Hapoel Tel Aviv	Sakhnin
15:30				Stadium: Doha Stadium; Attendance: 1,800

30 January 2016 21	Hapoel Tel Aviv	0–1	Hapoel Beer Sheva	Tel Aviv
17:30				Stadium: Bloomfield Stadium; Attendance: 9,354

7 February 2016 22	Maccabi Tel Aviv	1–1	Hapoel Tel Aviv	Tel Aviv
18:55				Stadium: Bloomfield Stadium; Attendance: 13,750

13 February 2016 23	Hapoel Tel Aviv	2–1	Hapoel Ra'anana	Tel Aviv
18:00				Stadium: Bloomfield Stadium; Attendance: 10,900

20 February 2016 24	Maccabi Haifa	0–0	Hapoel Tel Aviv	Haifa
18:00				Stadium: Sammy Ofer Stadium; Attendance: 11,400

29 February 2016 25	Hapoel Tel Aviv	0–2	Hapoel Acre	Tel Aviv
18:00				Stadium: Bloomfield Stadium; Attendance: 10,700

5 March 2016 26	Maccabi Petah Tikva	1–1	Hapoel Tel Aviv	Petah Tikva
15:00				Stadium: HaMoshava Stadium; Attendance: 5,200

==== Relegation round ====
Pos	Team	Pld	W	D	L	GF	GA	GD	Pts	Relegation
7	Maccabi Petah Tikva	33	13	7	13	34	35	−1	46	
8	Bnei Yehuda	33	13	7	13	37	43	−6	46	
9	Hapoel Tel Aviv	33	10	12	11	30	37	−7	42	
10	Hapoel Kfar Saba	33	9	11	13	23	37	−14	38	
11	Ironi Kiryat Shmona	33	8	12	13	32	39	−7	36	
12	Hapoel Haifa	33	7	13	13	38	48	−10	34	
13	Hapoel Acre (R)	33	9	7	17	27	48	−21	34	Relegation to Liga Leumit
14	Maccabi Netanya (R)	33	1	9	23	14	50	−36	12	Relegation to Liga Leumit

Source: Israel Football Association, Soccerway
Rules for classification: 1) Points; 2) Goal difference; 3) Matches won; 4) Goals scored; 5) Head-to-head points; 6) Head-to-head goal difference; 7) Head-to-head goals scored; 8) Play-off.
(R) Relegated

==== Results ====
19 March 2016 1	Hapoel Kfar Saba	0–3	Hapoel Tel Aviv	Kfar Saba
17:15				Stadium: Levita Stadium; Attendance: 3,800

2 April 2016 2	Hapoel Tel Aviv	1–0	Hapoel Acre	Tel Aviv
18:00				Stadium: Bloomfield Stadium; Attendance: 5,900

10 April 2016 3	Maccabi Netanya	0–1	Hapoel Tel Aviv	Netanya
18:30				Stadium: Netanya Stadium; Attendance: 5,600

16 April 2016 4	Ironi Kiryat Shmona	1–1	Hapoel Tel Aviv	Kiryat Shmona
15:45				Stadium: Kiryat Shmona Municipal Stadium; Attendance: 2,700

30 April 2016 5	Hapoel Tel Aviv	3–3	Hapoel Haifa	Tel Aviv
18:00				Stadium: Bloomfield Stadium; Attendance: 5,500

7 May 2016 6	Bnei Yehuda	2–4	Hapoel Tel Aviv	Tel Aviv
16:00				Stadium: Bloomfield Stadium; Attendance: 5,700

15 May 2016 7	Hapoel Tel Aviv	0–0	Maccabi Petah Tikva	Tel Aviv
18:30				Stadium: Bloomfield Stadium; Attendance: 5,500

=== State Cup ===
==== Results ====
Eighth round	Hapoel Nazareth Illit	3–3 (a.e.t.) (2–4 p)	Hapoel Tel Aviv	Nof HaGalil, Israel
				Stadium: Green Stadium

Round of 16	Hapoel Kfar Saba	2–1	Hapoel Tel Aviv	Kfar Saba, Israel
				Stadium: Levita Stadium

=== Toto Cup ===
==== Table ====
Pos	Team	Pld	W	D	L	GF	GA	GD	Pts	MPT	BnY	MTA	HTA
1	Maccabi Petah Tikva (A)	3	3	0	0	9	2	+7	9		3–0		
2	Bnei Yehuda (A)	3	2	0	1	5	4	+1	6			3–1	2–0
3	Maccabi Tel Aviv	3	1	0	2	4	7	−3	3	0–3			
4	Hapoel Tel Aviv	3	0	0	3	3	8	−5	0	2–3		1–3	

Updated to match(es) played on 28 October 2015. Source: football.org.il (in Hebrew)
Rules for classification: 1st points; 2nd goal difference; 3rd matches won; 4th goals scored; 5th head-to-head; 6th decision match
(A) Advanced to the quarter finals
