= Samuel Gilmore (footballer) =

Nigerian footballer

Samuel Arowolo Gilmore
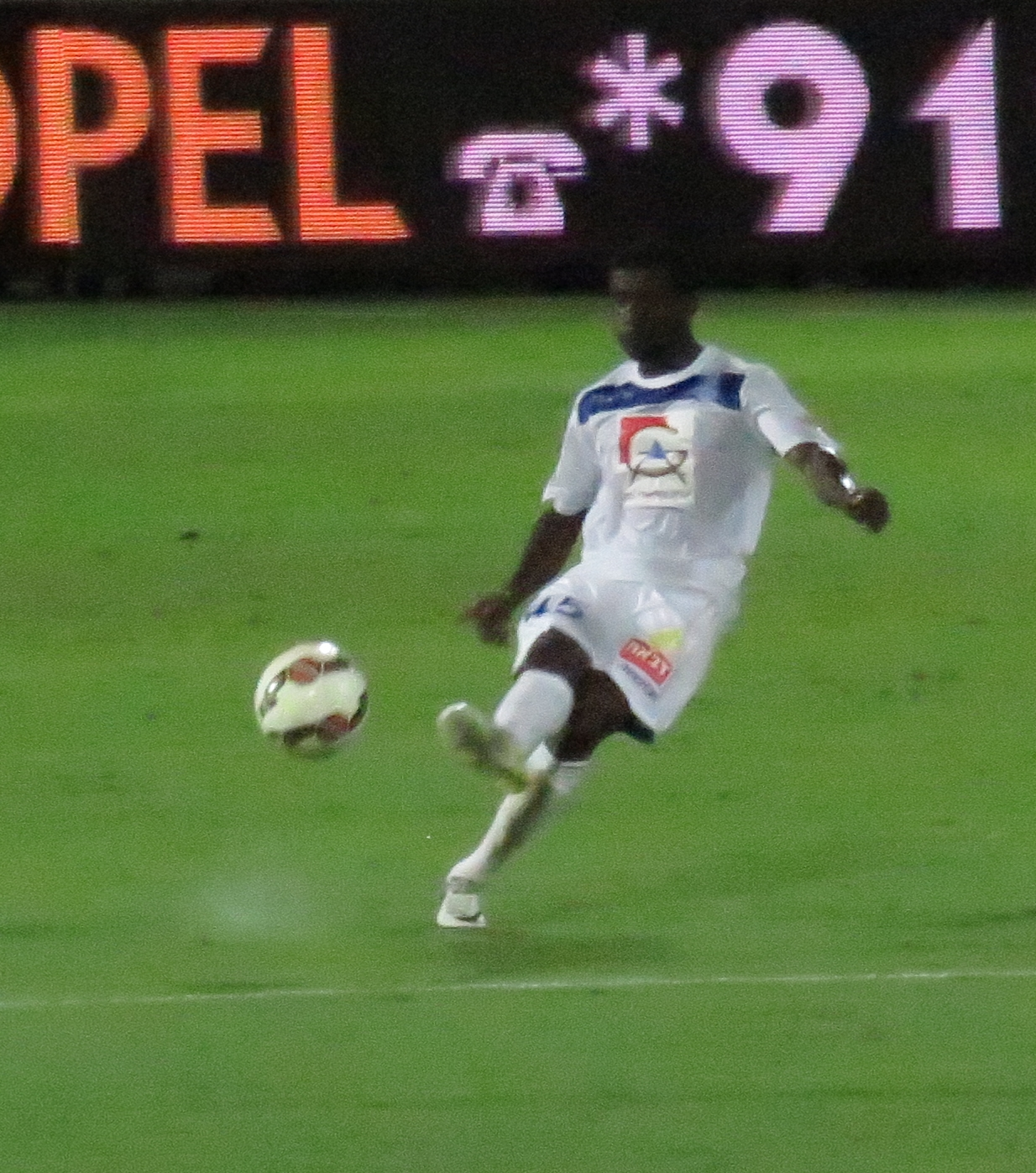

Personal information
- Full name: Samuel Arowolo Gilmore
- Date of birth: 20 July 1996 (age 30)
- Place of birth: Lagos, Nigeria
- Height: 1.70 m (5 ft 7 in)
- Position: Midfielder

Team information
- Current team: FK Kukësi

Youth career
- Success F.C. of Lagos

Senior career*
| Years | Team | Apps | (Gls) |
| 2013–2015 | Magic F.C. | 56 | (19) |
| 2015–2016 | Hapoel Acre | 26 | (2) |
| 2017 | Hapoel Petah Tikva | 9 | (1) |
| 2017– | FK Kukësi | 0 | (0) |
- * Club domestic league appearances and goals as of 28 January 2017

Samuel Arowolo Gilmore (born 20 July 1996) is a Nigerian footballer, who plays as a midfielder for the Albanian Superliga champions FK Kukësi.

== Club career ==
Gilmore began his career with Success F.C. of Lagos in Nigeria. In 2013, he signed with Magic F.C.

In summer 2015 he joined the Israeli club Hapoel Acre on a one-season loan deal. He played his first game in the Israeli Premier League on 31 August 2015 against Bnei Yehuda Tel Aviv He scored his first goal in the Israeli Premier League on 26 September 2015 against Hapoel Be'er Sheva.

On 30 of August 2017 he signed permanent contract with Albanian Superliga champions FK Kukësi.
