= Mihai Pintilii =

Romanian footballer (born 1984)

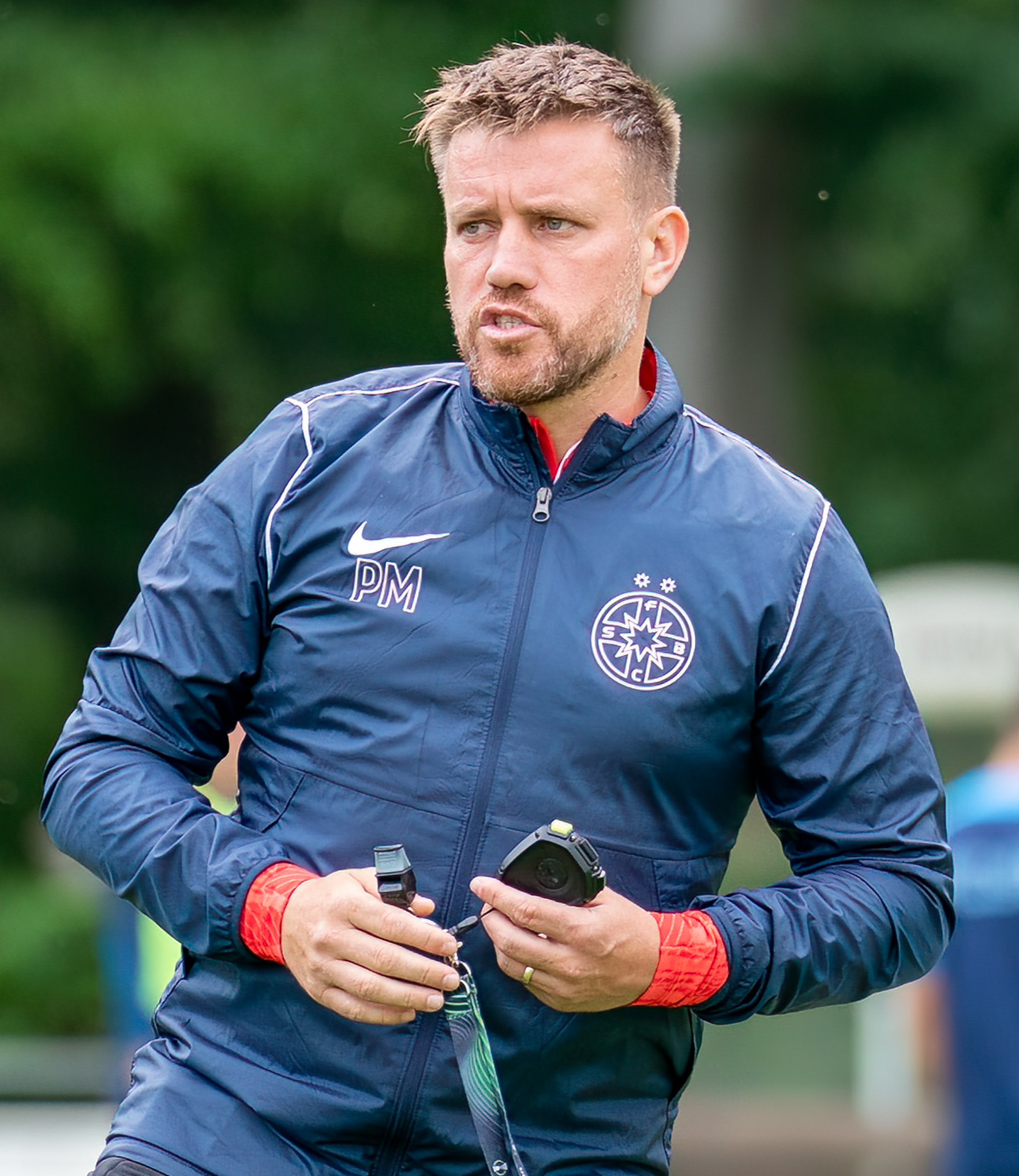
- Pintilii in 2023

Personal information
- Full name: Doru Mihai Pintilii
- Date of birth: 9 November 1984 (age 42)
- Place of birth: Iași, Romania
- Height: 1.80 m (5 ft 11 in)
- Position: Midfielder

Team information
- Current team: FCSB (assistant)

Youth career
- –2002: Noua Generație Iași

Senior career*
Years	Team	Apps	(Gls)
2002–2004	Viitorul Hârlău		
2004–2006	Auxerre Lugoj	15	(1)
2007–2009	Jiul Petroșani	85	(8)
2010	Internațional Curtea de Argeș	15	(0)
2010–2012	Pandurii Târgu Jiu	59	(7)
2012–2014	Steaua București	53	(5)
2014–2015	Al-Hilal	12	(0)
2015	→ Pandurii Târgu Jiu (loan)	10	(1)
2015	Hapoel Tel Aviv	14	(0)
2016–2020	FCSB	72	(4)
Total		335	(26)

International career
2011–2018	Romania	46	(1)

Managerial career
- 2020–2026: FCSB (assistant)
- 2022: FCSB (caretaker)
- 2026: Levadiakos (assistant)
- 2026–: FCSB (assistant)
- * Club domestic league appearances and goals

Doru Mihai Pintilii (born 9 November 1984) is a Romanian former professional footballer who played as a midfielder, currently assistant coach at Liga I club FCSB.

A midfielder known for his combative playing style, Pintilii started out at Viitorul Hârlău and Auxerre Lugoj. He then appeared in over 210 top flight matches for Jiul Petroșani, Internațional Curtea de Argeș, Pandurii Târgu Jiu and FC Steaua București combined. During his career, he also had brief stints abroad with Al-Hilal and Hapoel Tel Aviv, respectively.

Internationally, Pintilii amassed 46 caps for the Romania national team between 2011 and 2018, and represented the country in the UEFA Euro 2016.

== Club career ==
=== Steaua București ===
In May 2012, Steaua București signed Mihai Pintilii from Pandurii Târgu Jiu for undisclosed fee. They also loaned Mihai Răduț to Pandurii. On 2 March 2013, he scored two goals in a Liga I game against Gaz Metan Mediaș.

=== Al-Hilal ===
On 7 June 2014, Pintilii signed a three-year $3.9 million plus bonuses contract with Al-Hilal. He was an important part of the team that reached the final of the 2014 AFC Champions League, where Al-Hilal were defeated by Western Sydney Wanderers.

=== Hapoel Tel Aviv ===
Al Hilal had not paid Pintilii for five months and on 19 June 2015, he signed a three-year contract with Israeli club Hapoel Tel Aviv.

== International career ==
Pintilii made his debut for the Romania national team on 10 August 2011, in a 1–0 friendly win over San Marino.

== Career statistics ==
=== Club ===
Appearances and goals by club, season and competition
Club	Season	League			National cup (Note: Includes Cupa României)		League cup (Note: Includes Saudi Crown Prince Cup, Cupa Ligii, Toto Cup)		Continental		Other		Total	
Club	Season	Division	Apps	Goals	Apps	Goals	Apps	Goals	Apps	Goals	Apps	Goals	Apps	Goals
Viitorul Hârlău	2002–03	Divizia C					—		—		—		?	?
Viitorul Hârlău	2003–04	Divizia C					—		—		—		?	?
Viitorul Hârlău	Total						—		—		—		?	?
Auxerre Lugoj	2004–05	Divizia C					—		—		—		?	?
Auxerre Lugoj	2005–06	Divizia C					—		—		—		?	?
Auxerre Lugoj	2006–07	Liga II	15	1			—		—		—		15	1
Auxerre Lugoj	Total		15	1			—		—		—		15	1
Jiul Petroșani	2006–07	Liga I	11	0	—		—		—		—		11	0
Jiul Petroșani	2007–08	Liga II	30	4	2	0	—		—		—		32	4
Jiul Petroșani	2008–09	Liga II	30	3	0	0	—		—		—		30	3
Jiul Petroșani	2009–10	Liga II	14	1	0	0	—		–		—		14	1
Jiul Petroșani	Total		85	8	2	0	—		—		—		87	8
Internațional Curtea de Argeș	2009–10	Liga I	15	0	—		—		—		—		15	0
Pandurii Târgu Jiu	2010–11	Liga I	29	3	0	0	—		—		—		29	3
Pandurii Târgu Jiu	2011–12	Liga I	30	4	1	0	—		—		—		31	4
Pandurii Târgu Jiu	Total		59	7	1	0	—		—		—		60	8
Steaua București	2012–13	Liga I	30	5	0	0	—		13 (Note: Appearances in UEFA Europa League)	0	—		43	5
Steaua București	2013–14	Liga I	23	0	4	0	—		9 (Note: Appearances in UEFA Champions League)	1	1 (Note: Appearance in Supercupa României)	1	37	2
Steaua București	Total		53	5	4	0	—		22	1	1	1	80	7
Al-Hilal	2014–15	Saudi Professional League	12	0	—		2	0	6 (Note: Appearances in AFC Champions League)	0	—		20	0
Pandurii Târgu Jiu (loan)	2014–15	Liga I	10	1	—		2	0	—		—		12	1
Hapoel Tel Aviv	2015–16	Israeli Premier League	14	0	—		2	0	—		—		16	0
FCSB	2015–16	Liga I	11	0	1	0	0	0	—		—		12	0
FCSB	2016–17	Liga I	21	3	2	0	1	0	4 (Note: Two appearances in UEFA Champions League, two appearances in UEFA Europa League)	0	—		28	3
FCSB	2017–18	Liga I	26	1	0	0	—		7 (Note: Three appearances in UEFA Champions League, four appearances in UEFA Europa League)	0	—		33	1
FCSB	2018–19	Liga I	9	0	0	0	—		6	0	—		15	0
FCSB	2019–20	Liga I	5	0	0	0	—		2	0	—		7	0
FCSB	Total		72	4	3	0	1	0	19	0	—		95	4
Career total			335	26	10	0	7	0	47	1	1	1	400	28

=== International ===
Appearances and goals by national team and year
National team	Year	Apps	Goals
Romania	2011	3	0
Romania	2012	6	0
Romania	2013	6	1
Romania	2014	7	0
Romania	2015	7	0
Romania	2016	7	0
Romania	2017	7	0
Romania	2018	3	0
Total		46	1

Scores and results list Romania's goal tally first, score column indicates score after each Pintilii goal.

List of international goals scored by Mihai Pintilii
No.	Date	Venue	Opponent	Score	Result	Competition
1	6 September 2013	Arena Națională, Bucharest, Romania	Hungary	2–0	3–0	2014 FIFA World Cup qualification

== Managerial statistics ==
As of match played 13 November 2022

Managerial record by team and tenure
Team	From	To	Record							
Team	From	To	P	W	D	L	GF	GA	GD	Win %
(Romania) FCSB (caretaker)	1 November 2022	29 November 2022	4	2	1	1	5	4	+1	50.00
Total			4	2	1	1	5	4	+1	50.00

== Honours ==
Auxerre Lugoj

- Divizia C: 2005–06

Steaua București

- Liga I: 2012–13, 2013–14
- Cupa României runner-up: 2013–14
- Supercupa României: 2013
- Cupa Ligii: 2015–16

Al-Hilal

- Saudi Crown Prince Cup runner-up: 2014–15
- AFC Champions League runner-up: 2014

Pandurii Târgu Jiu

- Cupa Ligii runner-up: 2014–15
