= Claudiu Bumba =

Romanian footballer (born 1994)

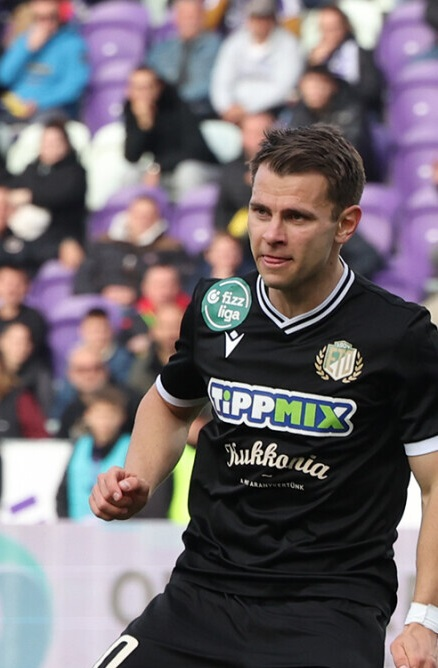
- Bumba playing for Győr in 2025

Personal information
- Full name: Claudiu Vasile Bumba
- Date of birth: 5 January 1994 (age 32)
- Place of birth: Baia Mare, Romania
- Height: 1.75 m (5 ft 9 in)
- Positions: Winger; attacking midfielder

Team information
- Current team: Győr
- Number: 10

Youth career
- 2004–2009: Atletic Club Satu Mare
- 2012–2013: → Roma (loan)

Senior career*
Years	Team	Apps	(Gls)
2009–2010	FC Baia Mare	12	(0)
2010–2011	FCMU Baia Mare	15	(7)
2011–2015	ASA Târgu Mureș	81	(15)
2015–2017	Hapoel Tel Aviv	31	(3)
2017	Dinamo București	13	(2)
2017–2018	Concordia Chiajna	27	(7)
2018–2019	Adanaspor	27	(3)
2019–2022	Kisvárda	84	(18)
2022–2023	Fehérvár	11	(0)
2023–	Győr	100	(29)

International career
2010–2011	Romania U17	5	(1)
2011	Romania U18	1	(0)
2011–2012	Romania U19	7	(0)
2012–2016	Romania U21	19	(4)
2012–2015	Romania	3	(0)
- * Club domestic league appearances and goals as of 8 November 2026

Claudiu Vasile Bumba (born 5 January 1994) is a Romanian professional footballer who plays as a winger or an attacking midfielder for Nemzeti Bajnokság I club Győr.

He started out at as a senior at Baia Mare teams FC and FCMU, before moving to FCM Târgu Mureș at age 17 to record his Liga I debut. After a loan spell at Roma Primavera between 2012 and 2013, Bumba returned to the then-renamed ASA Târgu Mureș for two additional years. Since leaving the latter, he went on to appear for sides in Israel, Turkey and Hungary, apart from stints in his native country.

A former Romania youth international at several levels, Bumba earned his first and only cap for the full side in 2012, in a 4–0 friendly victory over Turkmenistan.

== Club career ==
=== Early career ===
Bumba made his debut for FC Baia Mare on 10 October 2009, aged 15, in a 1–1 Liga II draw with Gaz Metan CFR Craiova. After the dissolution of the club, he chose to stay in the city with the newly-founded FC Maramureș Universitar Baia Mare, which he aided in achieving promotion to the second division.

=== Târgu Mureș ===
Bumba moved to FCM Târgu Mureș of the Liga I in June 2011. On 22 July that year, he registered his debut in the competition in a 0–1 loss at Dinamo București, and on 15 October scored his first league goal to earn his side a 1–1 away draw at Sportul Studențesc.

In February 2012, former Târgu Mureș manager Maurizio Trombetta confirmed that Italian team Udinese was monitoring Bumba. On 25 March, he netted in a 2–0 win over Astra Ploiești. In May, he was included by website and TV channel Sport.ro in a top ten list of Romanian youths to watch. Bumba finished his breakthrough season in Târgu Mureș with three goals from 29 appearances, but his performances could not help his team avoid relegation to the Liga II.

In the summer of 2012, Roma paid €600,000 to loan Bumba for one season. On 6 September, after recovering from an injury, he scored for the under-19 team in a 2–1 defeat of Inter Milan in the Supercoppa Primavera. Bumba returned to Târgu Mureș in July 2013, after the club changed its name from "FCM" to "ASA 2013".

On 11 January 2015, Bumba penned down a three-and-a-half-year deal with fellow Liga I club Astra Giurgiu, but after less than a month returned to ASA Târgu Mureș due to a breach of contract. He amassed 31 appearances and eight goals during the 2014–15 season, as his team finished second in the league championship with only three points behind FC Steaua București.

=== Hapoel Tel Aviv ===
On 19 June 2015, Bumba transferred to Israeli Premier League team Hapoel Tel Aviv in a move worth €650,000. He signed a four-year contract and was assigned the number 7 shirt. His debut was recorded on 1 August, starting in a 1–3 derby loss to Maccabi Tel Aviv in the Toto Cup.

Bumba featured in 31 games and scored two goals in all competitions during his first campaign in Israel, as Hapoel finished ninth overall in the national league. In the winter of 2017, he chose to leave the club because of unpaid wages.

=== Dinamo București and Concordia Chiajna ===
In February 2017, after a move to CFR Cluj fell through, Bumba returned to Romania by signing a two-and-a-half-year contract with Dinamo București as a free agent. He scored his first goal for "the Red Dogs" on 10 April, in a 2–1 league win against Astra Giurgiu.

Bumba won his first major trophy on 20 May 2017, following Dinamo's 2–0 defeat of ACS Poli Timișoara in the Cupa Ligii final, despite not making any appearances in the competition throughout the season. On 24 August, the club announced the termination of Bumba's contract on a mutual agreement, and one month later he moved to Concordia Chiajna.

On 27 September 2017, less than a week after joining Chiajna, he made his debut and netted in a 3–2 Liga I win over his previous club Dinamo București.

=== Adanaspor ===
Bumba changed countries again on 20 July 2018, after agreeing to a two-year deal with Turkish team Adanaspor. He contributed with three goals from 27 appearances during his first and only campaign in the TFF First League.

=== Kisvárda and Fehérvár ===
On 19 July 2019, Bumba signed for Hungarian club Kisvárda on a two-year contract with an option for another year. He made his debut on 31 August, entering as a 64th-minute substitute in a 0–3 Nemzeti Bajnokság I loss to Fehérvár.

On 24 June 2022, Bumba was formally unveiled as a Fehérvár player after agreeing to a two-year deal with the team.

== International career ==
Bumba made his debut for the Romania national under-17 team on 21 September 2010, scoring the only goal in a victory over Kazakhstan. He represented the side at the 2011 UEFA European Football Championship, where Romania finished last in its group. On 6 October 2011, Bumba made his debut for the under-19 team by coming on in the 44th minute of a match against Sweden.

Bumba played one game for the Romania senior team on 27 January 2012, when manager Victor Pițurcă brought him on in the 79th minute for Cristian Tănase in a 4–0 friendly victory over Turkmenistan. He impressed with his physical fitness, having an excellent muscular mass and stamina for his age.

== Personal life ==
Bumba has partial Hungarian heritage through one of his great-grandmothers, as he revealed in August 2021. In the same interview, he also stated that he considers taking up Hungarian citizenship after not being called up to the Romania national team in several years.

== Career statistics ==
=== Club ===
As of match played 8 November 2026

Appearances and goals by club, season and competition
Club	Season	League			National cup (Note: Includes Cupa României, Israeli State Cup, Magyar Kupa)		League cup (Note: Includes Toto Cup)		Continental		Other		Total	
Club	Season	Division	Apps	Goals	Apps	Goals	Apps	Goals	Apps	Goals	Apps	Goals	Apps	Goals
FC Baia Mare	2009–10	Liga II	12	0	0	0	—		—		—		12	0
FCMU Baia Mare	2010–11	Liga III	15	7	0	0	—		—		—		15	7
ASA Târgu Mureș	2011–12	Liga I	28	3	1	0	—		—		—		29	3
ASA Târgu Mureș	2013–14	Liga II	24	5	0	0	—		—		—		24	5
ASA Târgu Mureș	2014–15	Liga I	29	7	2	1	0	0	—		—		31	8
ASA Târgu Mureș	Total		81	15	3	1	0	0	—		—		84	16
Hapoel Tel Aviv	2015–16	Israeli Premier League	27	2	1	0	3	0	—		—		31	2
Hapoel Tel Aviv	2016–17	Israeli Premier League	4	1	0	0	2	0	—		—		6	1
Hapoel Tel Aviv	Total		31	3	1	0	5	0	—		—		37	3
Dinamo București	2016–17	Liga I	9	2	1	0	0	0	—		—		10	2
Dinamo București	2017–18	Liga I	4	0	0	0	—		0	0	—		4	0
Dinamo București	Total		13	2	1	0	0	0	0	0	—		14	2
Concordia Chiajna	2017–18	Liga I	27	7	0	0	—		—		—		27	7
Adanaspor	2018–19	TFF 1. Lig	27	3	0	0	—		—		—		27	3
Kisvárda	2019–20	Nemzeti Bajnokság I	23	3	3	0	—		—		—		26	3
Kisvárda	2020–21	Nemzeti Bajnokság I	31	4	5	3	—		—		—		36	7
Kisvárda	2021–22	Nemzeti Bajnokság I	30	11	0	0	—		—		—		30	11
Kisvárda	Total		84	18	8	3	—		—		—		92	21
Fehérvár	2022–23	Nemzeti Bajnokság I	11	0	2	1	—		4 (Note: Appearances in UEFA Conference League)	0	—		17	1
Győr	2023–24	Nemzeti Bajnokság II	33	17	2	0	—		—		—		35	17
Győr	2024–25	Nemzeti Bajnokság I	28	9	2	1	—		—		—		30	10
Győr	2025–26	Nemzeti Bajnokság I	31	3	4	1	—		6	0	—		41	4
Győr	2026–27	Nemzeti Bajnokság I	8	0	0	0	—		6 (Note: Two appearances in UEFA Champions League, four appearances and one goal in UEFA Conference League)	1	—		14	1
Győr	Total		100	29	8	2	—		12	1	—		120	32
Career total			401	84	29	8	5	0	10	0	—		445	92

=== International ===
As of match played 14 February 2015

Appearances and goals by national team and year
National team	Year	Apps	Goals
Romania
Romania	2012	1	0
Romania	2015	2	0
Total		3	0

== Honours ==
FCMU Baia Mare

- Liga III: 2010–11

Dinamo București

- Cupa Ligii: 2016–17

Győr

- Nemzeti Bajnokság I: 2025–26

Individual

- Nemzeti Bajnokság I Team of the Season by M4 Sport: 2024–25
