= Doru Bratu =

Romanian association football player

Personal information
- Date of birth: 27 May 1989 (age 37)
- Place of birth: Bucharest, Romania
- Height: 1.81 m (5 ft 11 1/2 in)
- Positions: Center back; left back

Youth career
- Rapid București

Senior career*
Years	Team	Apps	(Gls)
2007–2011	Rapid București	0	(0)
2010–2011	→ Juventus București (loan)	24	(3)
2011–2012	FC Snagov	14	(0)
2012	Concordia Chiajna	11	(0)
2012–2014	FCSB	2	(0)
2014	Pandurii Târgu Jiu	4	(0)
2014–2015	Universitatea Cluj	1	(0)
2015–2016	Farul Constanţa	27	(0)
2017–2019	Rapid București	31	(1)
2019	Carmen București		
2019	Sportul Snagov	2	(0)
Total		85	(3)
- * Club domestic league appearances and goals as of 9 December 2019

Doru Bratu (born 27 May 1989 in Bucharest) is a Romanian professional footballer who plays as a defender for Liga II side Sportul Snagov.

== Honours ==
Steaua București

- Liga I: 2012–13
- Supercupa României: 2013
