= Mihály Nagy (footballer, born 1992) =

Hungarian footballer (born 1992)

Krisztián Nagy
Personal information
- Full name: Krisztián Mihály Nagy
- Date of birth: 20 June 1992 (age 34)
- Place of birth: Siklós, Hungary
- Height: 1.78 m (5 ft 10 in)
- Position: Centre-forward

Team information
- Current team: Ajka
- Number: 8

Youth career
- 2004–2007: Siklós
- 2005–2006: → Pécs (loan)

Senior career*
Years	Team	Apps	(Gls)
2007–2008	Siklós	24	(11)
2008–2010	Kozármisleny	5	(1)
2009–2010	→ Honvéd (loan)	0	(0)
2010–2013	Honvéd	1	(0)
2012–2013	→ Kazincbarcika (loan)	9	(0)
2013–2017	Kozármisleny	88	(38)
2017	Szentlőrinc	14	(6)
2017–2021	Ajka	76	(45)
2021–2023	Kisvárda	10	(0)
2023–2024	Kozármisleny	6	(0)
2024–	Ajka	24	(4)
- * Club domestic league appearances and goals as of 1 January 2025

Krisztián Mihály Nagy (born 20 June 1992) is a Hungarian football player who plays for Ajka.

== Club career ==
On 16 June 2021, Nagy signed with Kisvárda.

== Career statistics ==
As of 9 August 2020.

Appearances and goals by club, season and competition
Club	Season	League			Cup		Continental		Other		Total	
Club	Season	Division	Apps	Goals	Apps	Goals	Apps	Goals	Apps	Goals	Apps	Goals
Siklós	2007–08	Megyei Bajnokság I	24	11	0	0	—		—		24	11
Siklós	Total		24	11	0	0	0	0	0	0	24	11
Kozármisleny	2008–09	Nemzeti Bajnokság II	2	1	2	0	—		—		4	1
Kozármisleny	2009–10	Nemzeti Bajnokság II	3	0	0	0	—		—		3	0
Kozármisleny	2013–14	Nemzeti Bajnokság II	22	4	1	1	—		2	1	25	6
Kozármisleny	2014–15	Nemzeti Bajnokság III	28	16	3	1	—		—		31	17
Kozármisleny	2015–16	Nemzeti Bajnokság III	25	16	5	2	—		—		30	18
Kozármisleny	2016–17	Nemzeti Bajnokság II	13	2	2	1	—		—		15	3
Kozármisleny	Total		93	39	13	5	0	0	2	1	108	45
Budapest Honvéd	2012–13	Nemzeti Bajnokság I	1	0	1	1	—		—		2	1
Budapest Honvéd	Total		1	0	1	1	0	0	0	0	2	1
Budapest Honvéd II	2011–12	Nemzeti Bajnokság II	13	5	0	0	—		—		13	5
Budapest Honvéd II	2012–13	Nemzeti Bajnokság II	14	5	0	0	—		—		14	5
Budapest Honvéd II	Total		27	10	0	0	0	0	0	0	27	10
Kazincbarcika	2012–13	Nemzeti Bajnokság II	9	0	0	0	—		—		9	0
Kazincbarcika	Total		9	0	0	0	0	0	0	0	9	0
Szentlőrinc	2016–17	Nemzeti Bajnokság III	14	6	1	0	—		—		15	6
Szentlőrinc	Total		14	6	1	0	0	0	0	0	15	6
Ajka	2017–18	Nemzeti Bajnokság III	18	6	1	0	—		—		19	6
Ajka	2018–19	Nemzeti Bajnokság III	29	23	4	2	—		—		33	25
Ajka	2019–20	Nemzeti Bajnokság II	26	13	2	2	—		—		28	15
Ajka	2020–21	Nemzeti Bajnokság II	3	3	0	0	—		—		3	3
Ajka	Total		76	45	7	4	0	0	0	0	83	49
Career total			244	111	22	10	0	0	2	1	268	122
