= César Mendiondo =

Spanish footballer

Personal information
- Full name: César Domingo González López
- Date of birth: 25 June 1966 (age 60)
- Place of birth: Madrid, Spain
- Height: 1.73 m (5 ft 8 in)
- Position: Right-back

Youth career
- –1984: Atlético Madrid

Senior career*
Years	Team	Apps	(Gls)
1984–1985	Atlético Madrid C	4	(0)
1984–1986	Atlético Madrileño	33	(1)
1984–1985	Atlético Madrid	1	(0)
1986–1989	Rayo Vallecano	96	(6)
1989–1995	Español	137	(6)
1995–1998	Mérida	14	(0)
Total		285	(13)

International career
- Spain Under-16
- Spain Under-17
- Spain Under-18
1985	Spain Under-19	1	(0)
1985	Spain Under-20	5	(0)
1985	Spain Under-21	4	(0)

Managerial career
- 2004–2008: Spain (assistant)
- 2008–2009: Fenerbahçe (assistant)
- 2013: Sivasspor (assistant)
- 2013–2014: Torrejón
- 2015: Hapoel Tel Aviv
- * Club domestic league appearances and goals

César Domingo González López (born 25 June 1966), known as César Mendiondo, is a Spanish former professional footballer who played as a right-back. He played in La Liga for Atlético Madrid, Español, and Mérida, making a total of 103 top flight appearances.

== Club career ==
Born in Madrid, Mendiondo started out playing in the youth teams of local club Atlético Madrid. He was promoted into the senior sides at the age of 18 in 1984, and although he appeared primarily for the B team, Atlético Madrileño, over the next two seasons, he did make one appearance in La Liga for the first team. Coach Luis Aragonés handed him his top flight debut in a 3–0 home win over Osasuna at the Vicente Calderón Stadium on 9 September 1984.

Mendiondo joined Segunda División side Rayo Vallecano in 1986, and was a key part of their first team for three seasons. They earned promotion as runners-up in 1988–89, but Mendiondo moved on at the end of that season, joining Español. At Español, he made 151 appearances in all competitions across six seasons, including two promotions to La Liga in 1989–90 and as champions in 1993–94.

Mendiondo moved to fellow first division side Mérida in 1995, but played only one game as the side was relegated in his first season. He was somewhat more prominent the following season as Mérida claimed the Segunda División title at the first attempt, earning Mendiondo the fourth La Liga promotion of his career. He retired in 1998 at the age of 32, following a final season in which he failed to make a single appearance for the club.

== International career ==
Mendiondo was a youth international for Spain at all levels from under-16 to under-21 level. 1985 was his busiest year as an international. He played his sole under-19 match, playing the first 66 minutes of a 2–1 loss against Mexico in Medina de Pomar before being replaced by José Aurelio Gay.

The same year, Mendiondo played all four matches for the under-21 side at the Toulon Tournament, in which Spain placed third after a third-place play-off win over Cameroon. He was also an ever-present for Spain at the 1985 FIFA World Youth Championship in the Soviet Union, in which Spain were the runners-up, losing 1–0 to Brazil in the final.

Mendiondo was never called up to the senior national side.

== Coaching career ==
After his retirement, Mendiondo returned to Atlético Madrid as part of the coaching team, and later joined the Royal Spanish Football Federation to play the same role with the Spanish national side. He reunited with his first manager, Luis Aragonés, when the latter took over as national team head coach, and was Aragonés's assistant when Spain won UEFA Euro 2008. Mendiondo followed Aragonés to Turkish Süper Lig side Fenerbahçe in 2008, where he again acted as his assistant. Fenerbahçe reached the final of the 2008–09 Turkish Cup in Aragonés and Mendiondo's solo season at the club, ultimately losing to Beşiktaş.

Mendiondo returned to the Süper Lig in 2013 with Sivasspor, this time as assistant to Roberto Carlos. Later the same year, he had his first spell as a head coach, back in his home country with Tercera División side Torrejón. Ahead of the 2015–16 season, Mendiondo took charge of Israeli Premier League team Hapoel Tel Aviv, replacing Eli Cohen. Mendiondo was sacked on 3 September after only two league games: a 0–0 away draw with Beitar Jerusalem at the Teddy Stadium, and a 3–0 home loss to Ironi Kiryat Shmona at the Bloomfield Stadium.

== Personal life ==
Mendiondo's father, José Mendiondo, was also a professional footballer, representing Atlético Madrid in La Liga as a left-back in the late 1950s and early 1960s. In October 2011, César legally changed his name to César Mendiondo López, making official the nickname by which both he and his father were best known.

== Honours ==
Atlético Madrid

- Copa del Rey: 1984–85

Rayo Vallecano

- Segunda División: Runners-up 1988–89

Espanyol

- Segunda División: 1993–94

Mérida

- Segunda División: 1996–97
