= Vasyl Khimich =

Ukrainian footballer

Personal information
- Full name: Vasyl Vasylyovych Khimich
- Date of birth: 17 May 2001 (age 25)
- Place of birth: Pistryalovo, Zakarpattia Oblast, Ukraine
- Position: Centre forward

Team information
- Current team: Kisvárda II

Youth career
- 2014–2016: Munkacs Mukacheve
- 2016: Meteor Pistryalovo
- 2016–2018: Munkacs Mukacheve
- 2018–2020: Kisvárda

Senior career*
Years	Team	Apps	(Gls)
2018	MFA Mukachevo (amateurs)	5	(2)
2020–2021	Kisvárda	2	(0)
2020–	Kisvárda II	50	(16)
- * Club domestic league appearances and goals as of 5 March 2023

Vasyl Vasylyovych Khimich (Ukrainian: Василь Васильович Хіміч; Hungarian: Himics László; born 17 May 2001) is a Ukrainian-Hungarian professional footballer who plays for Kisvárda II.

== Career statistics ==
As of 15 May 2021.

Appearances and goals by club, season and competition
Club	Season	League			Cup		Continental		Other		Total	
Club	Season	Division	Apps	Goals	Apps	Goals	Apps	Goals	Apps	Goals	Apps	Goals
Kisvárda	2019–20	Nemzeti Bajnokság I	1	0	0	0	—		0	0	1	0
Kisvárda	2020–21	Nemzeti Bajnokság I	1	0	1	0	—		0	0	2	0
Kisvárda	Total		2	0	1	0	0	0	0	0	3	0
Career total			2	0	1	0	0	0	0	0	3	0
