= Slobodan Simović =

Serbian footballer

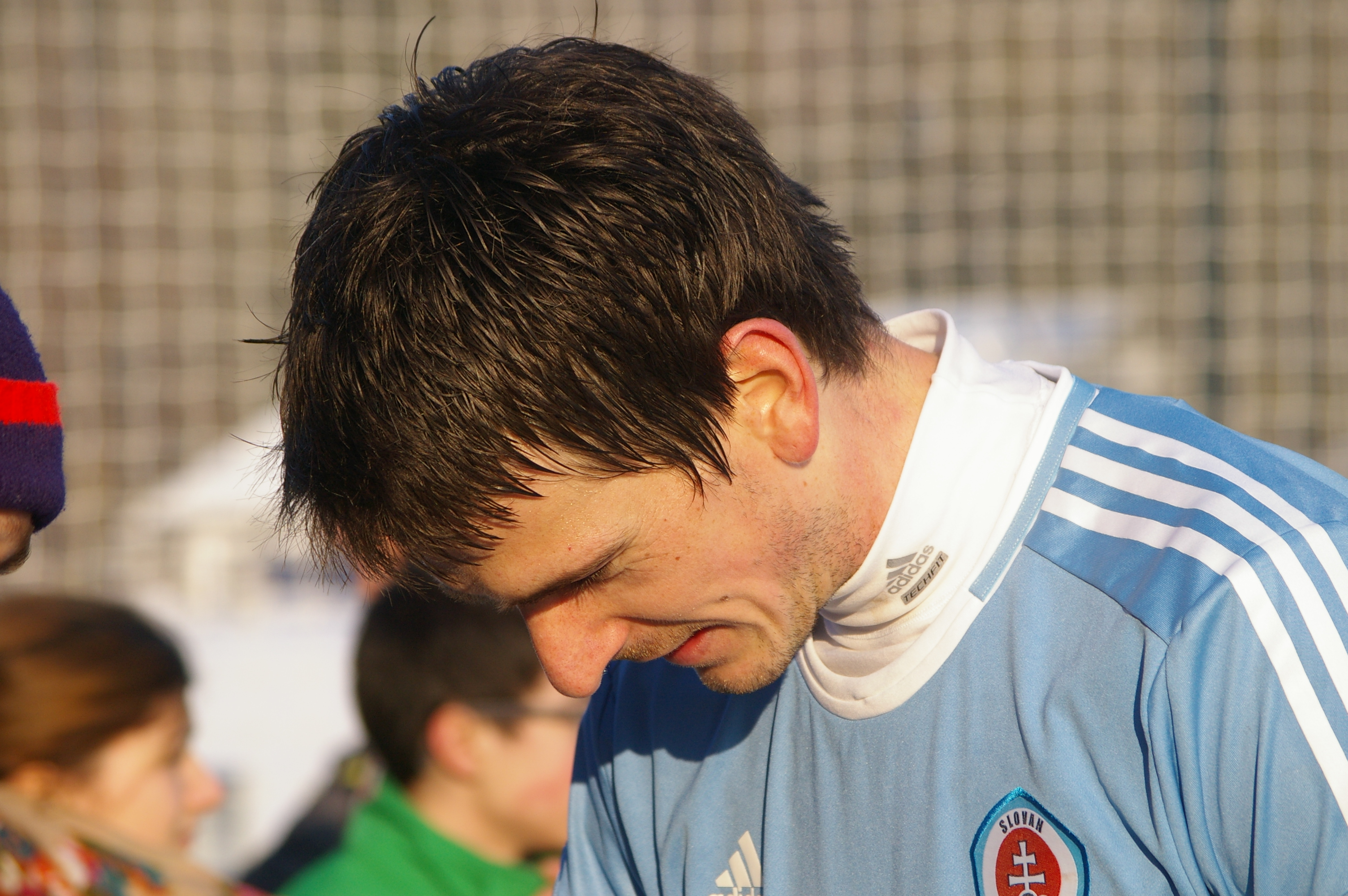
- Simović with Slovan Bratislava in 2016

Personal information
- Date of birth: 22 May 1989 (age 37)
- Place of birth: Čačak, SFR Yugoslavia
- Height: 1.90 m (6 ft 3 in)
- Position: Centre-back

Team information
- Current team: Radnički 1923
- Number: 14

Senior career*
Years	Team	Apps	(Gls)
2007–2009	Novi Sad	29	(1)
2009–2011	Spartak Subotica	57	(4)
2012–2014	Dinamo Minsk	74	(2)
2015–2016	Slovan Bratislava	33	(1)
2016–2017	Hapoel Kfar Saba	29	(0)
2017	Aktobe	10	(0)
2018–2019	BATE Borisov	10	(0)
2020–2022	Kisvárda	41	(3)
2023	Kolubara	9	(0)
2023–	Radnički 1923	81	(6)
- * Club domestic league appearances and goals as of 5 June 2026

Slobodan Simović (Serbian Cyrillic: Слободан Симовић; born 22 May 1989) is a Serbian professional footballer who plays as a centre-back for Radnički 1923.
