= Lazar Zličić =

Serbian footballer

Personal information
- Date of birth: 7 February 1997 (age 29)
- Place of birth: Novi Sad, FR Yugoslavia
- Height: 1.82 m (6 ft 0 in)
- Position: Midfielder

Team information
- Current team: Semen Padang
- Number: 33

Youth career
- 2003–2005: Veternik
- 2005–2015: Vojvodina

Senior career*
Years	Team	Apps	(Gls)
2015–2018	Vojvodina	46	(7)
2015–2016	→ Proleter Novi Sad (loan)	18	(1)
2018–2020	Voždovac	30	(4)
2020–2022	Kisvárda	45	(1)
2022	Aksu	11	(1)
2023	Mura	15	(2)
2023–2024	Napredak Kruševac	24	(3)
2024–2025	Novi Pazar	6	(0)
2025	Napredak Kruševac	14	(0)
2026	Sloga Doboj	9	(0)
2026–	Semen Padang	1	(0)

International career
2013–2014	Serbia U17 (Note: Competitive UEFA matches only.)	6	(0)
2015–2016	Serbia U19	6	(0)
2017	Serbia U21	1	(0)
- * Club domestic league appearances and goals as of 13 September 2026

Lazar Zličić (Serbian Cyrillic: Лазар Зличић; born 7 February 1997) is a Serbian professional footballer who plays as a midfielder for Championship club Semen Padang.

== Club career ==
=== Vojvodina ===
Born in Novi Sad, Zličić started playing football with local club Veternik at the age of 6, and later moved to Vojvodina, where he passed all youth categories. After his youth career, he was loaned to Proleter Novi Sad in the summer of 2015 on dual registration. He made his SuperLiga debut for Vojvodina under coach Milan Kosanović in the 17th round of the 2015–16 season against Radnik Surdulica, where he also scored a goal.

Playing for Proleter Novi Sad as a loaned player, Zličić made 18 Serbian First League appearances and also scored one goal, against Sloga Petrovac na Mlavi. He was also nominated for the man of the match against Inđija, played on 10 April 2016.

At the beginning of the 2016–17 season, Zličić made five appearances in UEFA Europa League qualifying phase, all as a back-up player; he provided an assist to Nikola Trujić in a match against Bokelj. He scored two goals in a 5–0 win against Spartak Subotica, played on 28 August 2016 in the seventh round of the Serbian SuperLiga. Zličić also scored in the first round of the Serbian Cup against Bežanija, played on 21 September of the same year. Zličić started his first match on the field in the 19th round of the 2016–17 Serbian SuperLiga against Napredak Kruševac, when he also scored a goal.

=== Voždovac ===
On 1 September 2018, Zličić signed a three-year contract with Voždovac. On 4 February 2019, he suffered an anterior cruciate ligament injury in a friendly match against Japanese club Shonan Bellmare. As a result, he had surgery later that month.

=== Kisvárda ===
On 1 August 2020, Zličić joined Hungarian club Kisvárda.

== Career statistics ==
As of 11 December 2023

Appearances and goals by club, season and competition
Club	Season	League			National cup		Continental		Total	
Club	Season	Division	Apps	Goals	Apps	Goals	Apps	Goals	Apps	Goals
Proleter Novi Sad (loan)	2015–16	Serbian First League	18	1	1	0	—		19	1
Proleter Novi Sad (loan)	Total		18	1	1	0	—		19	1
Vojvodina	2015–16	Serbian SuperLiga	2	1	1	0	—		3	1
Vojvodina	2016–17	Serbian SuperLiga	23	3	2	1	5	0	30	4
Vojvodina	2017–18	Serbian SuperLiga	20	3	2	0	0	0	22	3
Vojvodina	2018–19	Serbian SuperLiga	1	0	0	0	—		1	0
Vojvodina	Total		46	7	5	1	5	0	56	8
Voždovac	2018–19	Serbian SuperLiga	13	1	0	0	—		13	1
Voždovac	2019–20	Serbian SuperLiga	17	3	0	0	—		17	3
Voždovac	Total		30	4	0	0	—		30	4
Kisvárda	2020–21	Nemzeti Bajnokság I	20	0	5	0	—		25	0
Kisvárda	2021–22	Nemzeti Bajnokság I	25	1	3	2	—		28	3
Kisvárda	Total		45	1	8	2	—		53	3
Aksu	2022	Kazakhstan Premier League	11	1	2	0	—		13	1
Mura	2022–23	Slovenian PrvaLiga	15	2	—		—		15	2
Napredak Kruševac	2023–24	Serbian SuperLiga	12	1	2	0	—		14	1
Career total			177	17	18	3	5	0	200	20
