= 2023–24 Kisvárda FC season =

Kisvárda
2023–24 season
- Chairman: Attila Révész
- Manager: Miloš Kruščić (until 12 August); Máté Gerliczki (interim, from 12 August to 3 September); János Mátyus (from 3 September to 7 November); Tamás Feczkó (from 8 November)
- Stadium: Várkerti Stadion
- Nemzeti Bajnokság I: 11th (relegated)
- Magyar Kupa: Semi-finals
- Top goalscorer: League: Jasmin Mešanović (7); All: Driton Camaj; Jasmin Mešanović (7 each)
- Highest home attendance: 3,150 v Ferencváros (3 February 2024, Nemzeti Bajnokság I)
- Lowest home attendance: 800 v MTK (2 April 2024, Magyar Kupa)
- Average home league attendance: 2,027
- Biggest win: 6–0 v Unione (Away, 1 November 2023, Magyar Kupa)
- Biggest defeat: 1–4 v Debrecen (Away, 21 August 2023, Nemzeti Bajnokság I)
Home colours	Away colours

The 2023–24 season was Kisvárda Football Club's 6th competitive season, 6th consecutive season in the Nemzeti Bajnokság I and 20th year in existence as a football club. In addition to the domestic league, Kisvárda participated in that season's editions of the Magyar Kupa.

Kisvárda played their first 9 games away, as they were unable to play in their home stadium, the Várkerti Stadion, due to the bacterial infection of the turf. The first round would have been played at their home before the problem of the pitch, but due to the request of Zalaegerszeg, who participated in European competition, they swapped the right to host.

The team changed managers three times during the season. On 12 August 2023, Miloš Kruščić was sacked after 4 points after 3 rounds. Máté Gerliczki, who has been promoted from his position as manager of the reserve team in the Nemzeti Bajnokság III, has been appointed on an interim basis. Last seasons Nemzeti Bajnokság II side Budafok manager, János Mátyus was appointed as Kruščić's permanent successor on 3 September 2023. After one win and five defeats in the league, he resigned on 7 November 2023. A day later, Tamás Feczkó, responsible for the academic development area in Kisvárda, was appointed manager.

With two games remaining, Kisvárda were relegated from the top flight on 5 May 2024 after Újpest defeated Diósgyőr 7–0 at home.

== Squad ==
Squad at end of season

Note: Flags indicate national team as defined under FIFA eligibility rules; some limited exceptions apply. Players may hold more than one non-FIFA nationality.

No.	Pos.	Nation	Player
1	GK	HUN	Marcell Kovács
3	DF	BIH	Aleksandar Jovičić
4	DF	CRO	Bernardo Matić
5	MF	MKD	Boban Nikolov
6	MF	HUN	Bence Ötvös
7	FW	MNE	Driton Camaj
8	MF	UKR	Bohdan Melnyk
9	MF	POL	Rafał Makowski
10	FW	BRA	Wellington Nem
11	MF	BRA	Lucas
14	DF	BIH	Branimir Cipetić
17	FW	HUN	Norbert Balogh

No.	Pos.	Nation	Player
18	MF	HUN	Kevin Körmendi
19	DF	BIH	Enes Alić
20	FW	CZE	Jaroslav Navrátil
21	FW	CRO	Andrija Filipović
23	DF	HUN	Imre Széles
27	FW	BIH	Jasmin Mešanović
30	GK	MNE	Danijel Petković
40	FW	MKD	Mario Ilievski
41	MF	HUN	Roland Bíró
42	DF	HUN	Tibor Lippai
44	MF	HUN	Raúl Stefan
97	FW	SRB	Miloš Spasić

== Transfers ==
=== Transfers in ===
Transfer window	Pos.	No.	Player	From
Summer	GK	1	(Hungary) Marcell Kovács	Soroksár
Summer	DF	14	(Bosnia and Herzegovina) Branimir Cipetić	(Croatia) Lokomotiva
Summer	FW	37	(Hungary) Ádám Czékus	Békéscsaba
Summer	DF	42	(Hungary) Tibor Lippai	Kazincbarcika
Winter	DF	4	(Croatia) Bernardo Matić	(Kazakhstan) Ordabasy
Winter	FW	10	(Brazil) Wellington Nem	Free agent (Note: Previous club Vitória.)
Winter	GK	12	(Ukraine) Borys Ponomarenko	Youth team
Winter	FW	21	(Croatia) Andrija Filipović	(Kazakhstan) Aktobe
Winter	DF	22	(Ukraine) Artur Kozachuk	Youth team
Winter	MF	55	(Ukraine) Nazar Ponomarenko	Youth team

=== Transfers out ===
Transfer window	Pos.	No.	Player	To
Summer	DF	2	(Ukraine) Viktor Hey	Released (Note: Joined MTK.)
Summer	DF	4	(Ukraine) Anton Kravchenko	Released
Summer	DF	5	(Serbia) Miloš Vranjanin	Released (Note: Joined Radnik Surdulica.)
Summer	MF	8	(Bulgaria) Yanis Karabelyov	Released (Note: Joined Botev Plovdiv.)
Summer	GK	12	(Ukraine) Artem Odyntsov	Diósgyőr
Summer	DF	25	(Brazil) Matheus Leoni	Released (Note: Joined Kecskemét.)
Summer	FW	67	(Hungary) Mihály Nagy	Released
Winter	GK	99	(Ukraine) Mykhaylo Hotra	Released (Note: Joined Tarpa.)

=== Loans in ===
Transfer window	Pos.	No.	Player	From	End date
Summer	FW	17	(Hungary) Norbert Balogh	(Slovakia) DAC Dunajská Streda	End of season
Summer	MF	18	(Hungary) Kevin Körmendi	Puskás Akadémia	End of season

=== Loans out ===
Transfer window	Pos.	No.	Player	To	End date
Winter	MF	10	(Hungary) Kristopher Vida	Nyíregyháza	End of season
Winter	FW	37	(Hungary) Ádám Czékus	Tiszakécske	End of season
Winter	MF	88	(Hungary) Erik Czérna	Budafok	End of season

== Competitions ==
=== Overview ===
Competition	First match	Last match	Starting round	Final position	Record							
Competition	First match	Last match	Starting round	Final position	Pld	W	D	L	GF	GA	GD	Win %
Nemzeti Bajnokság I	30 July 2023	18 May 2024	Matchday 1	11th	33	9	4	20	40	55	−15	27.27
Magyar Kupa	17 September 2024	23 April 2024	Round of 64	Semi-finals	5	4	0	1	18	4	+14	80.00
Total					38	13	4	21	58	59	−1	34.21

Source: Competitions

=== Nemzeti Bajnokság I ===
==== League table ====
Pos	Team	Pld	W	D	L	GF	GA	GD	Pts	Qualification or relegation
8	MTK	33	12	8	13	43	62	−19	44	
9	Zalaegerszeg	33	12	7	14	54	60	−6	43	
10	Újpest	33	11	4	18	45	67	−22	37	
11	Kisvárda (R)	33	9	4	20	40	55	−15	31	Relegation to the Nemzeti Bajnokság II
12	Mezőkövesd (R)	33	5	6	22	31	63	−32	21	Relegation to the Nemzeti Bajnokság II

Source: Hungarian Football Federation (in Hungarian), Soccerway
Rules for classification: 1) Points; 2) Matches won; 3) Goal difference; 4) Goals scored; 5) Head-to-head points; 6) Head-to-head goal difference; 7) Fair play ranking; 8) Drawing of lots.
(R) Relegated

==== Results summary ====
Overall								Home						Away					
Pld	W	D	L	GF	GA	GD	Pts	W	D	L	GF	GA	GD	W	D	L	GF	GA	GD
33	9	4	20	40	55	−15	31	7	1	8	24	22	+2	2	3	12	16	33	−17

Source: Hungarian Football Federation

==== Results by round ====
Round	1	2	3	4	5	6	7	8	9	10	11	12	13	14	15	16	17	18	19	20	21	22	23	24	25	26	27	28	29	30	31	32	33
Ground	A	A	A	A	A	A	A	A	A	H	A	H	H	H	H	H	H	H	H	H	A	H	H	A	A	H	A	H	A	H	A	H	A
Result	W	L	D	L	L	L	L	L	L	W	L	L	L	W	D	L	W	L	L	L	W	L	W	L	L	L	D	W	D	W	L	W	L
Position	2	8	8	9	10	10	10	12	12	11	12	12	12	12	12	12	12	12	12	12	11	11	11	11	11	11	11	11	11	11	11	11	11
Points	3	3	4	4	4	4	4	4	4	7	7	7	7	10	11	11	14	14	14	14	17	17	20	20	20	20	21	24	25	28	28	31	31

Source: Matches
A = Away; H = Home; W = Win; D = Draw; L = Loss

==== Matches ====
30 July 2023 1	Zalaegerszeg	0–2	Kisvárda	Zalaegerszeg
20:00 CEST (UTC+2)	Tajti (yellow card) 48'; Huszti (yellow card) 65'; Csóka (yellow card) 76'	Report	Mešanović 7', 15'; Vida (yellow card) 45+2'; Széles (yellow card) 52'	Stadium: ZTE Arena; Attendance: 2,314; Referee: Sándor Andó-Szabó

7 August 2023 2	Kecskemét	3–1	Kisvárda	Kecskemét
20:00 CEST (UTC+2)	K. Nagy (yellow card) 25'; Szuhodovszki 35'; Pálinkás 39'; Tóth (yellow card) 48'; Belényesi (yellow card) 50'; Májer (yellow card) 82'; Szalai 90+3'	Report	Petković (yellow card) 35'; Jovičić (yellow card) 35'; Spasić 45'; Kruščić (manager) (yellow card) 50'	Stadium: Széktói Stadion; Attendance: 2,523; Referee: Mihály Káprály

11 August 2023 3	MTK	0–0	Kisvárda	Budapest
20:00 CEST (UTC+2)		Report		Stadium: Hidegkuti Nándor Stadion; Attendance: 1,979; Referee: Márton Rúsz

21 August 2023 4	Debrecen	4–1	Kisvárda	Debrecen
20:15 CEST (UTC+2)	Kyziridis 7'; Mojžiš (yellow card) 45+2'; Dzsudzsák 77' (pen.); Lončar 84', (yellow card) 84'; Bódi 90+5'	Report	Vida 52'; Szőr (yellow card) 55'; Camaj (yellow card) 90+4'	Stadium: Nagyerdei Stadion; Attendance: 4,011; Referee: Dr Bence Csonka

26 August 2023 5	Diósgyőr	2–0	Kisvárda	Miskolc
17:45 CEST (UTC+2)	Bitok (yellow card) 18'; Gera 38'; Edomwonyi 45+1'	Report		Stadium: Diósgyőri Stadion; Attendance: 6,651; Referee: István Vad

1 September 2023 6	Újpest	3–2	Kisvárda	Budapest
20:00 CEST (UTC+2)	Ljujić 28'; Ambrose (yellow card) 42', (goal) 53'; Ganea (yellow card) 69'; Mörschel 81'; Mack (yellow card) 90+13'	Report	Mešanović 6'; Cipetić (yellow card) 23'; Ötvös (yellow card) 34'; Kovačić (yellow card) 55'; Jovičić (yellow card) 56', (goal) 72'; Balogh (yellow card) 90+13'	Stadium: Szusza Ferenc Stadion; Attendance: 3,980; Referee: Sándor Andó-Szabó

24 September 2023 7	Ferencváros	1–0	Kisvárda	Budapest
17:30 CEST (UTC+2)	Lisztes 44'; Sigér (yellow card) 70'; Botka (yellow card) 86'	Report	Melnyk (yellow card) 43'; Cipetić (yellow card) 56'; Ilievski (yellow card) 77'; Lippai (yellow card) 84'; Kovačić (yellow card) 90+2'	Stadium: Groupama Arena; Attendance: 8,127; Referee: Gergő Bogár

1 October 2023 8	Fehérvár	3–1	Kisvárda	Székesfehérvár
15:00 CEST (UTC+2)	Serafimov 29'; Schön (yellow card) 36'; Flores (yellow card) 41', (goal) 90+5'; Kodro 60'; Katona (yellow card) 64'	Report	Camaj 11', (yellow card) 20'; Melnyk (yellow card) 36'; Mešanović (yellow card) 42'; Lippai (yellow card) 59'; Balogh (yellow card) 90+2'	Stadium: Sóstói Stadion; Attendance: 2,272; Referee: József Erdős

6 October 2023 9	Puskás Akadémia	1–0	Kisvárda	Felcsút
20:30 CEST (UTC+2)	Gruber (yellow card) 38'; Ormonde-Ottewill (yellow card) 40'; Golla 57'; Komáromi (yellow card) 90'; Szolnoki (yellow card) 90+2'	Report	Lippai (yellow card) 34'; Jovičić (red card) 74'	Stadium: Pancho Aréna; Attendance: 1,120; Referee: Tamás Bognár

21 October 2023 10	Kisvárda	2–1	Mezőkövesd	Kisvárda
12:30 CEST (UTC+2)	Cipetić 29' (pen.); Balogh 41'; Ilievski (yellow card) 87'; Mátyus (manager) (yellow card) 90'	Report	Széles 22' (o.g.); Beriashvili (yellow card) 27'; Gomis (yellow card) 87'; Lukić (yellow card) 90'	Stadium: Várkerti Stadion; Attendance: 2,150; Referee: Ádám Pillók

29 October 2023 11	Paks	3–1	Kisvárda	Paks
15:30 CET (UTC+1)	J. Szabó 16'; Windecker 48'; Mezei 80'; Lenzsér (yellow card) 90+4'	Report	Vida (yellow card) 2'; Melnyk (yellow card) 26'; Balogh 74'	Stadium: Fehérvári úti Stadion; Attendance: 2,078; Referee: Mihály Káprály

5 November 2023 12	Kisvárda	0–1	Zalaegerszeg	Kisvárda
12:30 CET (UTC+1)	Ötvös (yellow card) 4'; Melnyk (yellow card) 85'	Report	Todoroski (yellow card) 7'; Medgyes (yellow card) 41'; Sajbán 74'; Ubochioma (yellow card) 90+2'	Stadium: Várkerti Stadion; Attendance: 1,820; Referee: Tamás Bognár

12 November 2023 13	Kisvárda	1–2	Kecskemét	Kisvárda
13:30 CET (UTC+1)	Ilievski 8'; Nikolov (yellow card) 45+4'	Report	Leoni (yellow card) 23'; Horváth 45+3' (pen.), (yellow card) 45+4'; Vágó 67', (yellow card) 77'; Májer (yellow card) 88'; Szűcs (yellow card) 90+1'	Stadium: Várkerti Stadion; Attendance: 2,141; Referee: Balázs Berke

25 November 2023 14	Kisvárda	3–1	MTK	Kisvárda
14:45 CET (UTC+1)	Széles 21'; Cipetić 56' (pen.); Melnyk (yellow card) 61'; Czékus 90+5'	Report	Antonov (yellow card) 29'; Stieber 69', (yellow card) 76'; Kosznovszky (yellow card) 81'	Stadium: Várkerti Stadion; Attendance: 1,890; Referee: József Erdős

2 December 2023 15	Kisvárda	0–0	Debrecen	Kisvárda
19:30 CET (UTC+1)	Stefan (yellow card) 39'; Jovičić (yellow card) 70'	Report	Ferenczi (yellow card) 29'	Stadium: Várkerti Stadion; Attendance: 2,050; Referee: Csaba Pintér

10 December 2023 16	Kisvárda	1–2	Diósgyőr	Kisvárda
13:00 CET (UTC+1)	Jovičić (yellow card) 84'; Camaj (yellow card) 90', (goal) 90+4'	Report	Požeg Vancaš 41' (pen.); Vallejo (yellow card) 57'; Kampetsis (yellow card) 80'; Acolatse 85'; Gera (yellow card) 90'	Stadium: Várkerti Stadion; Attendance: 1,841; Referee: Dr Bence Csonka

16 December 2023 17	Kisvárda	4–0	Újpest	Kisvárda
15:00 CET (UTC+1)	Ilievski 34', 53'; Navrátil 46'; Széles (yellow card) 48'; Jovičić (yellow card) 57'; Nikolov 67'	Report	Csoboth (yellow card) 27'; Mack (yellow card) 49'	Stadium: Várkerti Stadion; Attendance: 1,815; Referee: Márton Rúsz

3 February 2024 18	Kisvárda	1–3	Ferencváros	Kisvárda
15:00 CET (UTC+1)	Matić (yellow card) 11'; Mešanović 65'	Report	Abu Fani (yellow card) 32', (goal) 42'; Lončar 61'; Pešić 69'	Stadium: Várkerti Stadion; Attendance: 3,150; Referee: Ádám Farkas

7 February 2024 19	Kisvárda	1–2	Fehérvár	Kisvárda
17:45 CET (UTC+1)	Nikolov (yellow card) 50'; Melnyk (yellow card) 85'; Larsen 87' (o.g.)	Report	Gradišar 56'; Stefanelli 82'; T. Tóth (yellow card) 84'	Stadium: Várkerti Stadion; Attendance: 1,850; Referee: Tamás Bognár

10 February 2024 20	Kisvárda	0–2	Puskás Akadémia	Kisvárda
12:30 CET (UTC+1)	Jovičić (yellow card) 40'; Lippai (yellow card) 58'; Filipović (yellow card) 74'	Report	Nagy 18'; Komáromi 35'; Soisalo (yellow card) 54'	Stadium: Várkerti Stadion; Attendance: 1,725; Referee: István Vad

17 February 2024 21	Mezőkövesd	1–2	Kisvárda	Mezőkövesd
15:30 CET (UTC+1)	Dražić 3' (pen.); Lukić (yellow card) 35'; Szalai (yellow card) 88'	Report	Filipović 28'; Cipetić 57'; Ötvös (yellow card) 83'	Stadium: Városi Stadion; Attendance: 1,451; Referee: Balázs Berke

25 February 2024 22	Kisvárda	0–1	Paks	Kisvárda
15:00 CET (UTC+1)	Lippai (yellow card) 19'; Lucas (yellow card) 76'; Jovičić (yellow card) 87'; Melnyk (yellow card) 87'; Camaj (yellow card) 89'	Report	Könyves (yellow card) 23'; Mezei 33' (pen.); Szappanos (yellow card) 58'; Kinyik (yellow card) 76'	Stadium: Várkerti Stadion; Attendance: 1,910; Referee: Péter Antal

2 March 2024 23	Kisvárda	1–0	Zalaegerszeg	Kisvárda
14:30 CET (UTC+1)	Lucas 41'	Report		Stadium: Várkerti Stadion; Attendance: 1,585; Referee: József Erdős

9 March 2024 24	Kecskemét	3–1	Kisvárda	Kecskemét
15:15 CET (UTC+1)	Horváth 8' (pen.), 25'; Zsótér (yellow card) 14'; Banó-Szabó 63'; Zeke (yellow card) 67'	Report	Spasić 13'; Camaj (yellow card) 50'; Lucas (yellow card) 75'	Stadium: Széktói Stadion; Attendance: 2,635; Referee: Mihály Káprály

17 March 2024 25	MTK	2–1	Kisvárda	Budapest
17:30 CET (UTC+1)	Jurina (yellow card) 6'; Molnár 17'; Bognár 34' (pen.)	Report	Jovičić (yellow card) 40', (goal) 86'; Navrátil (yellow card) 49'; Lippai (yellow card) 79'	Stadium: Hidegkuti Nándor Stadion; Attendance: 1,938; Referee: Csaba Pintér

30 March 2024 26	Kisvárda	1–3	Debrecen	Kisvárda
14:30 CET (UTC+1)	Mešanović 5'; Ötvös (yellow card) 23'; Cipetić (yellow card) 53'	Report	Vajda 39'; Domingues 54'; Manrique 90'	Stadium: Várkerti Stadion; Attendance: 2,500; Referee: István Vad

6 April 2024 27	Diósgyőr	1–1	Kisvárda	Miskolc
16:30 CEST (UTC+2)	Gera 36'; Odyntsov (yellow card) 90+2'	Report	Filipović (yellow card) 33'; Cipetić 66' (pen.); Nikolov (yellow card) 90+2'	Stadium: Diósgyőri Stadion; Attendance: 4,398; Referee: Dr Bence Csonka

13 April 2024 28	Kisvárda	4–1	Újpest	Kisvárda
14:30 CEST (UTC+2)	Navrátil 8'; Mešanović 17'; M. Kovács (yellow card) 29'; Matić 39', (yellow card) 69'; Makowski 54'	Report	Ljujić 30' (pen.); Huszti (yellow card) 46'; Radošević (yellow card) 53'; Mörschel (yellow card) 89'	Stadium: Várkerti Stadion; Attendance: 2,450; Referee: Csaba Pintér

20 April 2024 29	Ferencváros	0–0	Kisvárda	Budapest
17:00 CEST (UTC+2)	B. Varga (yellow card) 71'	Report	Nikolov (yellow card) 42'; Stefan (yellow card) 51'	Stadium: Groupama Arena; Attendance: 13,749; Referee: Mihály Káprály

28 April 2024 30	Kisvárda	1–0	Fehérvár	Kisvárda
15:15 CEST (UTC+2)	Matić (yellow card) 23'; Camaj 53' (pen.); Lucas (yellow card) 90+4'	Report	Serafimov (yellow card) 52'; Gradišar (yellow card) 77'; Fiola (yellow card) 79'	Stadium: Várkerti Stadion; Attendance: 2,350; Referee: Csaba Pintér

4 May 2024 31	Puskás Akadémia	4–2	Kisvárda	Felcsút
15:30 CEST (UTC+2)	Puljić 30'; Nagy 38', 50'; Komáromi 65'; Szolnoki (yellow card) 81'; Batik (yellow card) 89'	Report	Stefan (yellow card) 19'; Camaj (yellow card) 23'; Navrátil 43'; Ésik 90+1'; Matić (yellow card) 90+3'	Stadium: Pancho Aréna; Attendance: 1,310; Referee: Marcell Derdák

12 May 2024 32	Kisvárda	4–3	Mezőkövesd	Kisvárda
14:15 CEST (UTC+2)	Camaj 18', 45+1'; Mešanović 26'; Cipetić 35'; Lippai (yellow card) 59'	Report	Szolgai (yellow card) 47'; Kállai (yellow card) 52'; Brtan (yellow card) 80'; Ináncsi 85'; Molnár 87', 90+1'	Stadium: Várkerti Stadion; Attendance: 1,200; Referee: Péter Zierkelbach

18 May 2024 33	Paks	2–1	Kisvárda	Paks
17:45 CEST (UTC+2)	Mezei 34', (yellow card) 65'; B. Szabó (yellow card) 49'; Hahn 85'	Report	Melnyk (yellow card) 38'; Cipetić (yellow card) 72'; Matić (yellow card) 77'; Ilievski (yellow card) 82'; Spasić 90+1'	Stadium: Fehérvári úti Stadion; Attendance: 3,111; Referee: Sándor Andó-Szabó

=== Magyar Kupa ===
17 September 2023 Round of 64	Pilis	0–5	Kisvárda	Pilis
15:00 CEST (UTC+2)	Nemes (yellow card) 54'; Miklósvári (yellow card) 86'	Report	Spasić 6'; Camaj 18'; Jovičić 24'; Melnyk 45+2' (pen.); Czékus (yellow card) 54', (goal) 67'; Ilievski (yellow card) 86'; Körmendi (yellow card) 89'	Stadium: Pilisi LK Sporttelep; Attendance: 500; Referee: Tibor Horváth

1 November 2023 Round of 32	Unione	0–6	Kisvárda	Budapest
12:00 CET (UTC+1)		Report	Nikolov 13'; Vida 30', 45', 53'; Melnyk 87'; Camaj 90'	Stadium: Hévízi úti Stadion; Attendance: 200; Referee: Tamás Sipos

28 February 2024 Round of 16	Tiszakécske	0–3	Kisvárda	Tiszakécske
18:00 CEST (UTC+2)	Takács (yellow card) 51'	Report	Lucas (yellow card) 40'; Makowski 56', 58'; Ilievski 66'	Stadium: Városi Stadion; Attendance: 400; Referee: Márió Zimmermann

2 April 2024 Quarter-finals	Kisvárda	3–2	MTK	Kisvárda
20:00 CEST (UTC+2)	Jovičić 8', 90'; Spasić 21'; Makowski (yellow card) 22'; Cipetić (yellow card) 90+5'; Feczkó (manager) (yellow card) 90+5'	Report	Bognár 59'; Hey 87'; P. Kovács I (yellow card) 90+5'	Stadium: Várkerti Stadion; Attendance: 800; Referee: Gergő Bogár

23 April 2024 Semi-finals	Paks	2–1	Kisvárda	Paks
20:00 CEST (UTC+2)	Papp 27'; Hahn 53'; Tóth (yellow card) 58'; Vécsei (yellow card) 70'	Report	Melnyk (yellow card) 8'; Matić 21'; Jovičić (yellow card) 55'; Mešanović (yellow card) 57'; Ötvös (yellow card) 64'; Lippai (yellow card) 87'; Feczkó (manager) (yellow card) 89'	Stadium: Fehérvári úti Stadion; Attendance: 1,798; Referee: József Erdős

== Statistics ==
=== Overall ===
Appearances (Apps) numbers are for appearances in competitive games only, including sub appearances.
Source: Competitions

No.	Player	Pos.	Nemzeti Bajnokság I				Magyar Kupa				Total			
No.	Player	Pos.	Apps	Goal	Booked	Sent off (straight red)	Apps	Goal	Booked	Sent off (straight red)	Apps	Goal	Booked	Sent off (straight red)
1	(Hungary) Marcell Kovács	GK	19		1		2				21		1	
3	(Bosnia and Herzegovina) Aleksandar Jovičić	DF	30	2	8	1	5	3	1		35	5	9	1
4	(Croatia) Bernardo Matić	DF	12	1	5		2	1			14	2	5	
5	(North Macedonia) Boban Nikolov	MF	22	1	4		4	1			26	2	4	
6	(Hungary) Bence Ötvös	MF	29		4		5		1		34		5	
7	(Montenegro) Driton Camaj	FW	29	5	6		5	2			34	7	6	
8	(Ukraine) Bohdan Melnyk	MF	23		8		5	2	1		28	2	9	
9	(Poland) Rafał Makowski	MF	30	1			5	2	1		35	3	1	
10	(Brazil) Wellington Nem	FW	4				1				5			
10	(Hungary) Kristopher Vida	MF	12	1	2		1	3			13	4	2	
11	(Brazil) Lucas	MF	20	1	3		2		1		22	1	4	
12	(Ukraine) Borys Ponomarenko	GK												
14	(Bosnia and Herzegovina) Branimir Cipetić	DF	30	5	4		4		1		34	5	5	
17	(Hungary) Norbert Balogh	FW	16	2	2		2				18	2	2	
18	(Hungary) Kevin Körmendi	MF	17				4		1		21		1	
19	(Bosnia and Herzegovina) Enes Alić	DF	14				1				15			
20	(Czech Republic) Jaroslav Navrátil	FW	28	3	1		4				32	3	1	
21	(Croatia) Andrija Filipović	FW	9	1	2		2				11	1	2	
22	(Ukraine) Artur Kozachuk	DF												
23	(Hungary) Imre Széles	DF	24	1	2		1				25	1	2	
24	(Croatia) Dominik Kovačić	DF	9		2		1				10		2	
27	(Bosnia and Herzegovina) Jasmin Mešanović	FW	28	7	1		3		1		31	7	2	
30	(Montenegro) Danijel Petković	GK	14		1		3				17		1	
33	(Hungary) Tamás Rubus	DF	2				2				4			
37	(Hungary) Ádám Czékus	FW	9	1			2	1	1		11	2	1	
40	(North Macedonia) Mario Ilievski	DF	31	3	3		4	1	1		35	4	4	
42	(Hungary) Tibor Lippai	DF	16		7		4		1		20		8	
44	(Hungary) Raúl Stefan	MF	16		3		2				18		3	
55	(Ukraine) Nazar Ponomarenko	MF	2								2			
66	(Hungary) Maxim Osztrovka	MF	5								5			
69	(Hungary) Gennadiy Szikszai	FW	1								1			
70	(Hungary) Levente Szőr	MF	4		1						4		1	
72	(Hungary) Mátyás Simon	MF												
77	(Hungary) Ákos Ésik	FW	1	1							1	1		
97	(Serbia) Miloš Spasić	FW	19	3			4	2			23	5		
99	(Ukraine) Mykhaylo Hotra	GK												
Own goals				1								1		
Totals				40	70	1		18	11			58	81	1

=== Hat-tricks ===
No.	Player	Against	Result	Date	Competition
10	(Hungary) Kristopher Vida	Unione (A)	6–0	1 November 2023	Magyar Kupa

=== Clean sheets ===
			Clean sheets		
No.	Player	Games Played	Nemzeti Bajnokság I	Magyar Kupa	Total
1	(Hungary) Marcell Kovács	21	4	2	6
30	(Hungary) Danijel Petković	17	3	1	4
12	(Ukraine) Borys Ponomarenko	0			0
99	(Ukraine) Mykhaylo Hotra	0			0
Totals			7	3	10
