= 2022–23 Kisvárda FC season =

Kisvárda
2022–23 season
- Chairman: Attila Révész
- Manager: László Török (until 27 March); Miloš Kruščić (from 27 March)
- Stadium: Várkerti Stadion
- Nemzeti Bajnokság I: 6th
- Hungarian Cup: Quarter-finals
- UEFA Europa Conference League: Third qualifying round
- Top goalscorer: League: Rafał Makowski (7); All: Rafał Makowski (7)
- Highest home attendance: 3,150 vs Ferencváros (11 February 2023); Nemzeti Bajnokság I
- Lowest home attendance: 1,745 vs Paks (28 January 2023); Nemzeti Bajnokság I
- Average home league attendance: 2,266
- Biggest win: 3–0 vs Mosonmagyaróvár (A) (19 October 2022); Hungarian Cup
- Biggest defeat: 0–4 vs Újpest (A) (1 October 2022); Nemzeti Bajnokság I
Home colours	Away colours	Third colours
- All statistics correct as of 19 March 2023.

The 2022–23 season was Kisvárda Football Club's 5th season in the Nemzeti Bajnokság I and the 20th in existence as a football club. In addition to the domestic league, Kisvárda participated in this season's editions of the Magyar Kupa.

== Transfers ==
=== Summer ===
In: Note: Flags indicate national team as defined under FIFA eligibility rules; some limited exceptions apply. Players may hold more than one non-FIFA nationality.

No.	Pos.	Nation	Player
5	DF	SRB	Miloš Vranjanin (from (Latvia) Riga)
11	MF	HUN	Lucas (loan return from Diósgyőr)
23	DF	HUN	Imre Széles (from Gyirmót)
24	DF	CRO	Dominik Kovačić (from (Romania) Craiova)
40	FW	MKD	Mario Ilievski (from (Bulgaria) Septemvri Sofia)
89	GK	ROU	Otto Hindrich (loan from (Romania) CFR Cluj)
—	DF	HUN	Péter Králik (from Kisvárda II)
—	LW	HUN	Kristopher Vida (from (Poland) Piast Gliwice)
—	MF	HUN	Roland Bíró (from Kisvárda II)
—	FW	UKR	Yaroslav Gelesh (from Kisvárda II)

Out: Note: Flags indicate national team as defined under FIFA eligibility rules; some limited exceptions apply. Players may hold more than one non-FIFA nationality.

No.	Pos.	Nation	Player
5	DF	SRB	Lazar Ćirković (to Budapest Honvéd)
10	MF	ROU	Claudiu Bumba (to Fehérvár)
13	MF	SRB	Lazar Zličić (to (Kazakhstan) Aksu)
19	DF	ALB	Herdi Prenga (to Budapest Honvéd)
21	MF	HUN	András Gosztonyi (to Dunaújváros)
32	GK	HUN	Dávid Dombó (to Vasas)

=== Winter ===
In: Note: Flags indicate national team as defined under FIFA eligibility rules; some limited exceptions apply. Players may hold more than one non-FIFA nationality.

No.	Pos.	Nation	Player
—	LW	SRB	Miloš Spasić (from (Serbia) Radnik Surdulica)
—	DF	BIH	Aleksandar Jovičić (from (Croatia) Gorica)
—	DF	BIH	Enes Alić (from (Slovenia) Domžale)
—	GK	MNE	Danijel Petković (from (France) Angers)

Out: Note: Flags indicate national team as defined under FIFA eligibility rules; some limited exceptions apply. Players may hold more than one non-FIFA nationality.

No.	Pos.	Nation	Player
17	FW	ALB	Jasir Asani (to (South Korea) Gwangju)
45	MF	SRB	Slobodan Simović (to (Serbia) Kolubara)
71	DF	ROU	Andrei Peteleu (to (Romania) CFR Cluj)

== Pre–season and friendlies ==
Win Draw Loss Fixtures

25 June 2022 Friendly	Vasas (Hungary)	2–2	Kisvárda	Budapest, Hungary
CEST	Bobál 84', 87'	Report	Camaj 52'; Makowski 86'	Stadium: Szőnyi úti Stadion; Attendance: 0 Referee: József Ducsai

2 July 2022 Friendly	Kisvárda	1–1	(Croatia) Hajduk Split	Bad Blumau, Austria
CEST	Mešanović 30'	Report	Kačaniklić 50'	Attendance: 300

4 July 2022 Friendly	Kisvárda	2–1	(Romania) Universitatea Craiova	Vorau, Austria
CEST	Makowski 33'; Camaj 85' (pen.)	Report	Compagno 71'

5 July 2022 Friendly	Kisvárda	2–2	(Cyprus) AEK Larnaca	Kirchschlag in der Buckligen Welt, Austria
CEST	Mešanović 6'; Leoni 57'	Report	Faraj 67'; Trichkovski 90+2'	Referee: (Austria) Alan Kijas

8 July 2022 Friendly	Admira Wacker (Austria)	1–2	Kisvárda	Wien, Austria
CEST	Badji 62'	Report	Navrátil 55'; Ilievski 71'	Attendance: 500

14 July 2022 Friendly	Kisvárda	2–3	(Hungary) Diósgyőr	Kisvárda, Hungary
CEST	Navrátil 77'; Ilievski 87'	Report	Eppel 20' (pen.); Jurek 38'; Bertus 60'	Stadium: Várkerti Stadion; Attendance: 0 Referee: (Hungary) Ferenc Karakó

== Competitions ==
=== Overview ===
Competition	First match	Last match	Starting round	Final position	Record							
Competition	First match	Last match	Starting round	Final position	Pld	W	D	L	GF	GA	GD	Win %
Nemzeti Bajnokság I	31 July 2022	26 May 2023	Matchday 1	6th	33	10	13	10	43	49	−6	30.30
Hungarian Cup	17 September 2022	1 March 2023	Round of 64	Quarter-finals	4	3	0	1	6	2	+4	75.00
UEFA Europa Conference League	21 July 2022	11 August 2022	Second qualifying round	Third qualifying round	4	3	0	1	4	4	+0	75.00
Total					41	16	13	12	53	55	−2	39.02

Source: Competitions

=== Nemzeti Bajnokság I ===
==== League table ====
Pos	Team	Pld	W	D	L	GF	GA	GD	Pts
4	Puskás Akadémia	33	14	11	8	48	42	+6	53
5	Paks	33	14	7	12	57	57	0	49
6	Kisvárda	33	10	13	10	43	49	−6	43
7	Mezőkövesd	33	11	9	13	40	43	−3	42
8	Újpest	33	11	8	14	42	55	−13	41

Source: Hungarian Football Federation (in Hungarian), Soccerway
Rules for classification: 1) Points; 2) Matches won; 3) Goal difference; 4) Goals scored; 5) Head-to-head points; 6) Head-to-head goal difference; 7) Fair play ranking; 8) Drawing of lots.

==== Results summary ====
Overall								Home						Away					
Pld	W	D	L	GF	GA	GD	Pts	W	D	L	GF	GA	GD	W	D	L	GF	GA	GD
33	10	13	10	43	49	−6	43	6	7	4	24	20	+4	4	6	6	19	29	−10

Source: Soccerway

==== Results by round ====
Round	1	2	3	4	5	6	7	8	9	10	11	12	13	14	15	16	17	18	19	20	21	22	23	24	25	26	27	28	29	30	31	32	33
Ground	H	H	H	A	H	A	H	A	A	H	A	A	A	A	H	A	H	A	H	H	A	H	H	A	H	A	H	A	H	A	H	H	A
Result	D	W	D	W	W	W	L	L	L	W	D	W	D	W	L	L	D	D	D	W	D	L	L	D	D	D	D	L	D	L	W	W	L
Position	5	2	2	2	2	2	2	2	3	3	4	3	3	2	2	3	3	3	4	3	3	3	6	6	6	6	6	7	7	8	6	6	6

Source: Matches
A = Away; H = Home; W = Win; D = Draw; L = Loss

==== Matches ====
31 July 2022 1	Kisvárda	2–2	Debrecen	Kisvárda
15:45 CEST (UTC+2)	Camaj 50' (pen.); Makowski 87'	Report	Dzsudzsák 85'; Bárány 90+3'	Stadium: Várkerti Stadion; Attendance: 2,870; Referee: Balázs Berke

7 August 2022 2	Kisvárda	4–2	Mezőkövesd	Kisvárda
15:30 CEST (UTC+2)	Camaj 6'; Melnyk 37'; Ilievski 49'; Makowski 56'	Report	Schmiedl (red card) 35'; Vayda 48'; Jurina 79'	Stadium: Várkerti Stadion; Attendance: 1,927; Referee: Sándor Andó-Szabó

14 August 2022 3	Kisvárda	1–1	Puskás Akadémia	Kisvárda
18:00 CEST (UTC+2)	Mešanović 87'	Report	van Nieff 13'	Stadium: Várkerti Stadion; Attendance: 2,217; Referee: Csaba Pintér

21 August 2022 4	Zalaegerszeg	1–3	Kisvárda	Zalaegerszeg
17:55 CEST (UTC+2)	Tajti 27' (pen.)	Report	Camaj 30' (pen.); Melnyk 58', 88'	Stadium: ZTE Arena; Attendance: 2,062; Referee: Gergő Bogár

28 August 2022 5	Kisvárda	3–1	Fehérvár	Kisvárda
14:30 CEST (UTC+2)	Camaj 51'; Makowski 55'; Mešanović 63'	Report	Kodro 70' (pen.)	Stadium: Várkerti Stadion; Attendance: 2,340; Referee: Tamás Bognár

31 August 2022 6	Paks	1–3	Kisvárda	Paks
17:00 CEST (UTC+2)	Windecker 63'	Report	Navrátil 16'; Camaj 24'; Karabelyov 52'	Stadium: Fehérvári úti Stadion; Attendance: 1,604; Referee: Péter Antal

4 September 2022 7	Kisvárda	0–1	Budapest Honvéd	Kisvárda
14:45 CEST (UTC+2)		Report	Lukić 34' (pen.)	Stadium: Várkerti Stadion; Attendance: 2,452; Referee: Sándor Andó-Szabó

11 September 2022 8	Ferencváros	3–0	Kisvárda	Budapest
17:30 CEST (UTC+2)	R. Mmaee 27' (pen.), 63'; S. Mmaee 72'	Report		Stadium: Groupama Arena; Attendance: 9,111; Referee: Balázs Berke

1 October 2022 9	Újpest	4–0	Kisvárda	Budapest
14:30 CEST (UTC+2)	Vranjanin 31' (o.g.); Gouré 36', 45+1'; Simon 67'	Report	Kovačić (red card) 59'; Ötvös (red card) 90+3'	Stadium: Szusza Ferenc Stadion; Attendance: 1,984; Referee: Csaba Pintér

8 October 2022 10	Kisvárda	2–0	Vasas	Kisvárda
17:00 CEST (UTC+2)	Baráth 17' (o.g.); Makowski 38'	Report	Szivacski (red card) 27'	Stadium: Várkerti Stadion; Attendance: 2,403; Referee: Gergő Bogár

14 October 2022 11	Kecskemét	3–3	Kisvárda	Kecskemét
20:00 CEST (UTC+2)	Nagy 37' (pen.); B. Katona 57'; Đuranović 87'	Report	B. Varga 17' (o.g.); Camaj 53'; Ötvös 81'	Stadium: Széktói Stadion; Attendance: 2,108; Referee: Mihály Káprály

24 October 2022 12	Debrecen	2–3	Kisvárda	Debrecen
20:15 CEST (UTC+2)	Neofytidis 6'; Leoni 48' (o.g.)	Report	Makowski 37'; Kravchenko 57'; Navrátil 67'	Stadium: Nagyerdei Stadion; Attendance: 3,707; Referee: Balázs Berke

28 October 2022 13	Mezőkövesd	1–1	Kisvárda	Mezőkövesd
20:00 CEST	G. Bobál 80'	Report	Ilievski 54'	Stadium: Városi Stadion; Attendance: 1,811; Referee: Bence Csonka

5 November 2022 14	Puskás Akadémia	0–1	Kisvárda	Felcsút
17:00 CET (UTC+1)		Report	Ilievski 90+2'	Stadium: Pancho Aréna; Attendance: 1,120; Referee: Péter Antal

8 November 2022 15	Kisvárda	0–3	Zalaegerszeg	Kisvárda
18:00 CET (UTC+1)		Report	Ikoba 37', 60'; Manzinga 87'	Stadium: Várkerti Stadion; Attendance: 2,005; Referee: Mihály Káprály

13 November 2022 16	Fehérvár	4–1	Kisvárda	Székesfehérvár
13:30 CET (UTC+1)	Schön 25', 31'; Kastrati 65'; Dárdai 88'	Report	Makowski 62'; Karabelyov (red card) 90+2'	Stadium: MOL Aréna Sóstó; Attendance: 2,552; Referee: József Erdős

28 January 2023 17	Kisvárda	2–2	Paks	Kisvárda
14:30 CET (UTC+1)	Mešanović 64' (pen.); Ötvös 80'	Report	Varga 25' (pen.); Skribek 90+1'	Stadium: Várkerti Stadion; Attendance: 1,745; Referee: Tamás Bognár

4 February 2023 18	Budapest Honvéd	1–1	Kisvárda	Budapest
17:00 CET (UTC+1)	Lukić 48'	Report	Ilievski 74'	Stadium: Bozsik Aréna; Attendance: 980; Referee: Péter Antal

11 February 2023 19	Kisvárda	0–0	Ferencváros	Kisvárda
17:00 CET (UTC+1)		Report		Stadium: Várkerti Stadion; Attendance: 3,150; Referee: Ádám Farkas

17 February 2023 20	Kisvárda	2–1	Újpest	Kisvárda
20:00 CET (UTC+1)	Kovačić 35'; Makowski 52'	Report	Simon 47'	Stadium: Várkerti Stadion; Attendance: 1,890; Referee: Márton Rúsz

25 February 2023 21	Vasas	2–2	Kisvárda	Budapest
19:30 CET (UTC+1)	Hidi 18'; Feczesin 90'	Report	Mešanović 31'; Hegedűs 75' (o.g.)	Stadium: Illovszky Rudolf Stadion; Attendance: 1,350; Referee: Balázs Berke

4 March 2023 22	Kisvárda	0–1	Kecskemét	Kisvárda
14:15 CET (UTC+1)		Report	B. Katona 54'	Stadium: Várkerti Stadion; Attendance: 1,750; Referee: Tamás Bognár

11 March 2023 23	Kisvárda	0–1	Debrecen	Kisvárda
14:30 CET (UTC+1)		Report	Babunski 48'	Stadium: Várkerti Stadion; Attendance: 2,450; Referee: Mihály Káprály

18 March 2023 24	Mezőkövesd	1–1	Kisvárda	Mezőkövesd
14:05 CET (UTC+1)	Lukić 43'	Report	Mešanović 8'; Leoni (red card) 64'	Stadium: Városi Stadion; Attendance: 1,582; Referee: Bence Csonka

1 April 2023 25	Kisvárda	2–2	Puskás Akadémia	Kisvárda
13:00 CEST (UTC+2)	Navrátil (yellow card) 26'; Spasić 31', 61'; Camaj (yellow card) 75'; Alić (red card) 83'	Report	Colley (yellow card) 41'; Zahedi (yellow card) 64', (goal) 78'; Favorov 85' (pen.)	Stadium: Várkerti Stadion; Attendance: 1,768; Referee: József Erdős

9 April 2023 26	Zalaegerszeg	0–0	Kisvárda	Zalaegerszeg
16:30 CEST (UTC+2)	Szalay (yellow card) 52'; Kovács (yellow card) 65'; Huszti (yellow card) 74'; Tajti (yellow card) 76'	Report	Spasić (yellow card) 31'; Navrátil (yellow card) 41'; Ötvös (yellow card) 75'	Stadium: ZTE Arena; Attendance: 1,683; Referee: Gergő Bogár

16 April 2023 27	Kisvárda	0–0	Fehérvár	Kisvárda
15:30 CEST (UTC+2)	Mešanović (yellow card) 55'; Leoni (yellow card) 65'; Karabelyov (yellow card) 83'	Report		Stadium: Várkerti Stadion; Attendance: 2,010; Referee: Ádám Farkas

23 April 2023 28	Paks	2–0	Kisvárda	Paks
14:15 CEST (UTC+2)	Varga 43' (pen.), 77'; Osváth (yellow card) 45'	Report	Széles (yellow card) 18'; Jovičić (yellow card) 79'	Stadium: Fehérvári úti Stadion; Attendance: 2,097; Referee: Mihály Káprály

29 April 2023 29	Kisvárda	2–2	Budapest Honvéd	Kisvárda
17:00 CEST (UTC+2)	Mešanović 28', 65'	Report	Gomis (yellow card) 22'; Lukić 32', (yellow card) 76'; Kerezsi 82'; Mitrović (yellow card) 89'	Stadium: Várkerti Stadion; Attendance: 2,420; Referee: Bence Csonka

6 May 2023 30	Ferencváros	3–0	Kisvárda	Budapest
19:45 CEST (UTC+2)	Pászka 49'; Lisztes 53'; S. Mmaee 63'	Report	Navrátil (yellow card) 36'; Kovačić (yellow card) 55'	Stadium: Groupama Arena; Attendance: 13,133; Referee: Csaba Pintér

14 May 2023 31	Kisvárda	2–0	Újpest	Kisvárda
15:30 CEST (UTC+2)	Jovičić (yellow card) 37'; Hey (yellow card) 49'; Karabelyov (yellow card) 55'; Leoni 67'; Ilievski 79'	Report	Antzoulas (red card) 21'; Csoboth (yellow card) 58'; Diaby (yellow card) 70'	Stadium: Várkerti Stadion; Attendance: 2,670; Referee: József Erdős

19 May 2023 32	Kisvárda	2–1	Vasas	Kisvárda
20:30 CEST (UTC+2)	Mešanović 45+5' (pen.); Leoni 46', (yellow card) 78'; Karabelyov (yellow card) 51'	Report	Iyinbor (yellow card) 10'; Szilágyi (yellow card) 28'; Berecz 39'; Szivacski (yellow card) 45+4'; Novothny (yellow card) 49'; Sztojka (yellow card) 87'	Stadium: Várkerti Stadion; Attendance: 2,380; Referee: Sándor Andó-Szabó

26 May 2023 33	Kecskemét	1–0	Kisvárda	Kecskemét
18:15 CEST (UTC+2)	Szalai (yellow card) 56'; B. Katona 68'; B. Tóth (yellow card) 90+2'	Report	Melnyk (yellow card) 9'; Lucas (yellow card) 19'	Stadium: Széktói Stadion; Attendance: 4,457; Referee: Csaba Pintér

=== Hungarian Cup ===
17 September 2022 Round of 64	BVSC-Zugló	0–2	Kisvárda	Budapest
15:00 CEST (UTC+2)		Report	Lucas 26'; Vida 29'	Stadium: Szőnyi úti Stadion; Attendance: 200; Referee: Márton Rúsz

19 October 2022 Round of 32	Mosonmagyaróvár	0–3	Kisvárda	Mosonmagyaróvár
13:30 CEST (UTC+2)	Papp (yellow card) 36'	Report	Ilievski (yellow card) 36', (goal) 62'; Melnyk 45'; Navrátil 49'	Stadium: MTE Sporttelep; Attendance: 400; Referee: Tibor Horváth

8 February 2023 Round of 16	ESMTK	0–1 (a.e.t.)	Kisvárda	Budapest
13:00 CET (UTC+1)	R. Molnár (yellow card) 14'; Jeszenszky (yellow card) 72'; Wirth (yellow card) 75'; Túri (yellow card) 113'	Report	Melnyk (yellow card) 27'; Ötvös (yellow card) 78'; T. Molnár 120+3' (o.g.)	Stadium: ESMTK Sporttelep; Attendance: 500; Referee: Bence Hanyecz

1 March 2023 Quarter-finals	Budafok	2–0	Kisvárda	Budapest
17:00 CET (UTC+1)	Nándori 10'; Soltész (yellow card) 16'; Adorján (yellow card) 27'; Beke 45'; Vasvári (yellow card) 90+1'; Mátyus (not on pitch) (yellow card) 90+1'	Report	Leoni (yellow card) 74'	Stadium: Promontor utcai Stadion; Attendance: 700; Referee: Márió Zimmermann

=== UEFA Europa Conference League ===
==== Second qualifying round ====
21 July 2022 First leg	Kairat (Kazakhstan)	0–1	(Hungary) Kisvárda	Almaty, Kazakhstan
20:00 ALMT (UTC+6)	Astanov (yellow card) 53'; Bagnack (yellow card) 63'	Report	Leoni (yellow card) 40'; Ötvös (yellow card) 74'; Asani 82', (yellow card) 82'	Stadium: Almaty Central Stadium; Attendance: 17,182; Referee: Peter Kjærsgaard-Andersen (Denmark)

28 July 2022 Second leg	Kisvárda (Hungary)	1–0 (2–0 agg.)	(Kazakhstan) Kairat	Kisvárda, Hungary
18:00 CEST (UTC+2)	Ötvös (yellow card) 12'; Mešanović 39'; Makowski (yellow card) 56'	Report	Sadybekov (yellow card) 89'	Stadium: Várkerti Stadion; Attendance: 2,560; Referee: Chrysovalantis Theouli (Cyprus)
Note: Kisvárda won 2–0 on aggregate.

==== Third qualifying round ====
4 August 2022 First leg	Molde (Norway)	3–0	(Hungary) Kisvárda	Molde, Norway
19:00 CEST (UTC+2)	Breivik (yellow card) 60'; Hussain 63', (yellow card) 90+2'; Fofana 81'; Linnes 82'	Report	Kravchenko (yellow card) 59'; Ötvös 64'; Ilievski (yellow card) 90+2'	Stadium: Aker Stadion; Attendance: 3,404; Referee: Igor Stojchevski (North Macedonia)

11 August 2022 Second leg	Kisvárda (Hungary)	2–1 (2–4 agg.)	(Norway) Molde	Kisvárda, Hungary
21:00 CEST (UTC+2)	Asani 14', 29', (yellow card) 49'; Camaj (yellow card) 46'; Hey (yellow card) 58'	Report	Breivik (yellow card) 59'; Mannsverk 69'; Zekhnini (yellow card) 90+1'	Stadium: Várkerti Stadion; Attendance: 2,548; Referee: Alain Durieux (Luxembourg)
Note: Molde won 4–2 on aggregate.

== Statistics ==
=== Appearances and goals ===
Last updated on 19 March 2023.

No.	Pos	Nat	Player	Total		OTP Bank Liga		Europa Conference League		Hungarian Cup	
No.	Pos	Nat	Player	Apps	Goals	Apps	Goals	Apps	Goals	Apps	Goals
2	DF	(Ukraine) UKR	Viktor Hey	30	0	23	0	4	0	3	0
3	DF	(Bosnia and Herzegovina) BIH	Aleksandar Jovičić	3	0	3	0	0	0	0	0
4	DF	(Ukraine) UKR	Anton Kravchenko	13	1	8	1	4	0	1	0
5	DF	(Serbia) SRB	Miloš Vranjanin	10	0	7	0	1	0	2	0
6	MF	(Hungary) HUN	Bence Ötvös	27	2	21	2	3	0	3	0
7	FW	(Montenegro) MNE	Driton Camaj	31	6	24	6	4	0	3	0
8	MF	(Bulgaria) BUL	Yanis Karabelyov	29	1	22	1	4	0	3	0
9	MF	(Poland) POL	Rafał Makowski	30	7	23	7	4	0	3	0
10	MF	(Hungary) HUN	Kristopher Vida	19	1	15	0	0	0	4	1
11	MF	(Hungary) HUN	Lucas	18	1	11	0	3	0	4	1
12	GK	(Ukraine) UKR	Artem Odyntsov	9	-11	3	-7	4	-4	2	-0
18	MF	(Ukraine) UKR	Bohdan Melnyk	31	4	23	3	4	0	4	1
19	DF	(Bosnia and Herzegovina) BIH	Enes Alić	6	0	4	0	0	0	2	0
20	MF	(Czech Republic) CZE	Jaroslav Navrátil	28	3	21	2	4	0	3	1
23	DF	(Hungary) HUN	Imre Széles	11	0	9	0	0	0	2	0
24	DF	(Croatia) CRO	Dominik Kovačić	30	1	23	1	4	0	3	0
25	DF	(Brazil) BRA	Matheus Leoni	28	0	20	0	4	0	4	0
27	FW	(Bosnia and Herzegovina) BIH	Jasmin Mešanović	30	6	23	5	4	1	3	0
30	GK	(Montenegro) MNE	Danijel Petković	4	-4	2	-2	0	-0	2	-2
33	DF	(Hungary) HUN	Tamás Rubus	0	0	0	0	0	0	0	0
40	FW	(North Macedonia) MKD	Mario Ilievski	31	5	23	4	4	0	4	1
41	MF	(Hungary) HUN	Roland Bíró	3	0	2	0	0	0	1	0
67	FW	(Hungary) HUN	Mihály Nagy	0	0	0	0	0	0	0	0
88	MF	(Hungary) HUN	Erik Czérna	10	0	5	0	2	0	3	0
89	GK	(Romania) ROU	Otto Hindrich	19	-29	19	-29	0	-0	0	-0
97	LW	(Serbia) SRB	Miloš Spasić	9	0	7	0	0	0	2	0
Youth players:
26	FW	(Ukraine) UKR	Yaroslav Gelesh	1	0	1	0	0	0	0	0
55	MF	(Ukraine) UKR	Nazar Ponomarenko	0	0	0	0	0	0	0	0
70	MF	(Hungary) HUN	Levente Szőr	1	0	0	0	0	0	1	0
99	GK	(Ukraine) UKR	Mykhaylo Hotra	0	0	0	-0	0	-0	0	-0
Out to loan:
Players no longer at the club:
17	FW	(Albania) ALB	Jasir Asani	21	3	15	0	4	3	2	0
71	DF	(Romania) ROU	Andrei Peteleu	10	0	9	0	1	0	0	0

=== Top scorers ===
Includes all competitive matches. The list is sorted by shirt number when total goals are equal.

Last updated on 19 March 2023

Position	Nation	Number	Name	OTP Bank Liga	UEFA Europa Conference League	Hungarian Cup	Total
1	(Poland)	9	Rafał Makowski	7	0	0	7
2	(Montenegro)	7	Driton Camaj	6	0	0	6
2	(Bosnia and Herzegovina)	27	Jasmin Mešanović	5	1	0	6
4	(North Macedonia)	40	Mario Ilievski	4	0	1	5
5	(Ukraine)	18	Bohdan Melnyk	3	0	1	4
6	(Albania)	17	Jasir Asani	0	3	0	3
6	(Czech Republic)	20	Jaroslav Navrátil	2	0	1	3
8	(Hungary)	6	Bence Ötvös	2	0	0	2
9	(Ukraine)	4	Anton Kravchenko	1	0	0	1
9	(Bulgaria)	8	Yanis Karabelyov	1	0	0	1
9	(Hungary)	10	Kristopher Vida	0	0	1	1
9	(Hungary)	11	Lucas	0	0	1	1
9	(Croatia)	24	Dominik Kovačić	1	0	0	1
/	/	/	Own Goals	3	0	1	4
			TOTALS	35	4	6	45

=== Disciplinary record ===
Includes all competitive matches. Players with 1 card or more included only.

Last updated on 19 March 2023

Position	Nation	Number	Name	OTP Bank Liga		UEFA Europa Conference League		Hungarian Cup		Total (Hu Total)	
Position	Nation	Number	Name	Yellow card	Red card	Yellow card	Red card	Yellow card	Red card	Yellow card	Red card
DF	(Ukraine)	2	Viktor Hey	7	0	1	0	0	0	8 (7)	0 (0)
DF	(Ukraine)	4	Anton Kravchenko	0	0	1	0	0	0	1 (0)	0 (0)
DF	(Serbia)	5	Miloš Vranjanin	1	0	0	0	0	0	1 (1)	0 (0)
MF	(Hungary)	6	Bence Ötvös	4	1	3	0	1	0	8 (4)	1 (1)
FW	(Montenegro)	7	Driton Camaj	3	0	1	0	0	0	4 (3)	0 (0)
MF	(Bulgaria)	8	Yanis Karabelyov	2	1	0	0	0	0	2 (2)	1 (1)
MF	(Poland)	9	Rafał Makowski	0	0	1	0	0	0	1 (0)	0 (0)
MF	(Hungary)	11	Lucas	1	0	0	0	0	0	1 (1)	0 (0)
FW	(Albania)	17	Jasir Asani	1	0	2	0	0	0	3 (1)	0 (0)
MF	(Ukraine)	18	Bohdan Melnyk	6	0	0	0	1	0	7 (6)	0 (0)
MF	(Czech Republic)	20	Jaroslav Navrátil	2	0	0	0	0	0	2 (2)	0 (0)
DF	(Hungary)	23	Imre Széles	1	0	0	0	0	0	1 (1)	0 (0)
DF	(Croatia)	24	Dominik Kovačić	4	1	0	0	0	0	4 (4)	1 (1)
DF	(Brazil)	25	Matheus Leoni	3	1	1	0	1	0	5 (3)	1 (1)
FW	(Bosnia and Herzegovina)	27	Jasmin Mešanović	1	0	0	0	0	0	1 (1)	0 (0)
FW	(North Macedonia)	40	Mario Ilievski	2	0	1	0	1	0	4 (2)	0 (0)
DF	(Romania)	71	Andrei Peteleu	1	0	0	0	0	0	1 (1)	0 (0)
GK	(Romania)	89	Otto Hindrich	3	0	0	0	0	0	3 (3)	0 (0)
			TOTALS	42	4	11	0	4	0	57 (42)	4 (4)

=== Clean sheets ===
Position	Nation	Number	Name	Nemzeti Bajnokság I	UEFA Europa Conference League	Magyar Kupa	Total
1	(Ukraine)	12	Artem Odyntsov	1	2	2	5
2	(Romania)	89	Otto Hindrich	4	0	0	4
3	(Montenegro)	30	Danijel Petković	1	0	1	2
4	(Ukraine)	99	Mykhaylo Hotra	0	0	0	0
			TOTALS	4	2	3	9
