= Imre Széles =

Hungarian footballer (born 1995)

Personal information
- Full name: Imre Antal Széles
- Date of birth: 30 November 1995 (age 30)
- Place of birth: Győr, Hungary
- Height: 1.96 m (6 ft 5 in)
- Position: Defender

Team information
- Current team: MTK
- Number: 15

Youth career
- 2003–2006: Győrladamér
- 2006–2013: Győr
- 2013: Purbach

Senior career*
Years	Team	Apps	(Gls)
2013–2014	Gyirmót	0	(0)
2014–2017	MTK	0	(0)
2015–2017	MTK II	55	(4)
2017–2022	Gyirmót	111	(4)
2017–2022	Gyirmót II	30	(1)
2022–2025	Kisvárda	49	(2)
2022–2025	Kisvárda II	4	(0)
2025–	MTK	4	(0)
- * Club domestic league appearances and goals as of 19 January 2026

Imre Széles (born 30 November 1995) is a Hungarian professional footballer, who plays as a defender for Nemzeti Bajnokság I club MTK.

== Career ==
On 28 June 2022, Széles signed with Nemzeti Bajnokság I side Kisvárda.

On 11 June 2025, he returned to Nemzeti Bajnokság I club MTK.

== Career statistics ==
As of match played 9 August 2025

Appearances and goals by club, season and competition
Club	Season	League			National cup (Note: Includes Magyar Kupa)		League cup (Note: Includes Ligakupa)		Europe		Total	
Club	Season	Division	Apps	Goals	Apps	Goals	Apps	Goals	Apps	Goals	Apps	Goals
Gyirmót	2013–14	Nemzeti Bajnokság II	—		—		4	0	—		4	0
MTK	2014–15	Nemzeti Bajnokság I	0	0	—		2	0	—		2	0
MTK	2015–16	Nemzeti Bajnokság I	—		0	0	—		—		0	0
MTK	2016–17	Nemzeti Bajnokság I	—		1	0	—		—		1	0
MTK	Total		0	0	1	0	2	0	—		3	0
MTK II	2015–16	Nemzeti Bajnokság III	24	2	—		—		—		24	2
MTK II	2016–17	Nemzeti Bajnokság III	31	2	—		—		—		31	2
MTK II	Total		55	4	—		—		—		55	4
Gyirmót	2017–18	Nemzeti Bajnokság II	5	0	2	0	—		—		7	0
Gyirmót	2018–19	Nemzeti Bajnokság II	36	2	2	1	—		—		38	3
Gyirmót	2019–20	Nemzeti Bajnokság II	17	1	2	0	—		—		19	1
Gyirmót	2020–21	Nemzeti Bajnokság II	33	1	2	0	—		—		35	1
Gyirmót	2021–22	Nemzeti Bajnokság I	20	0	1	0	—		—		21	0
Gyirmót	Total		111	4	9	1	—		—		120	5
Gyirmót II	2017–18	Nemzeti Bajnokság III	24	1	—		—		—		24	1
Gyirmót II	2021–22	Nemzeti Bajnokság III	6	0	—		—		—		6	0
Gyirmót II	Total		30	1	—		—		—		30	1
Kisvárda	2022–23	Nemzeti Bajnokság I	15	0	2	0	—		0	0	17	0
Kisvárda	2023–24	Nemzeti Bajnokság I	24	1	1	0	—		—		25	1
Kisvárda	2024–25	Nemzeti Bajnokság II	10	1	4	0	—		—		14	1
Kisvárda	Total		49	2	7	0	—		0	0	56	2
Kisvárda II	2022–23	Nemzeti Bajnokság III	2	0	—		—		—		2	0
Kisvárda II	2024–25	Nemzeti Bajnokság III	2	0	—		—		—		2	0
Kisvárda II	Total		4	0	—		—		—		4	0
MTK	2025–26	Nemzeti Bajnokság I	1	0	0	0	—		—		1	0
Career total			250	11	17	1	6	0	0	0	273	12

== Honours ==
Kisvárda

- Nemzeti Bajnokság II: 2024–25
