= Kevin Körmendi =

Hungarian footballer (born 2001)

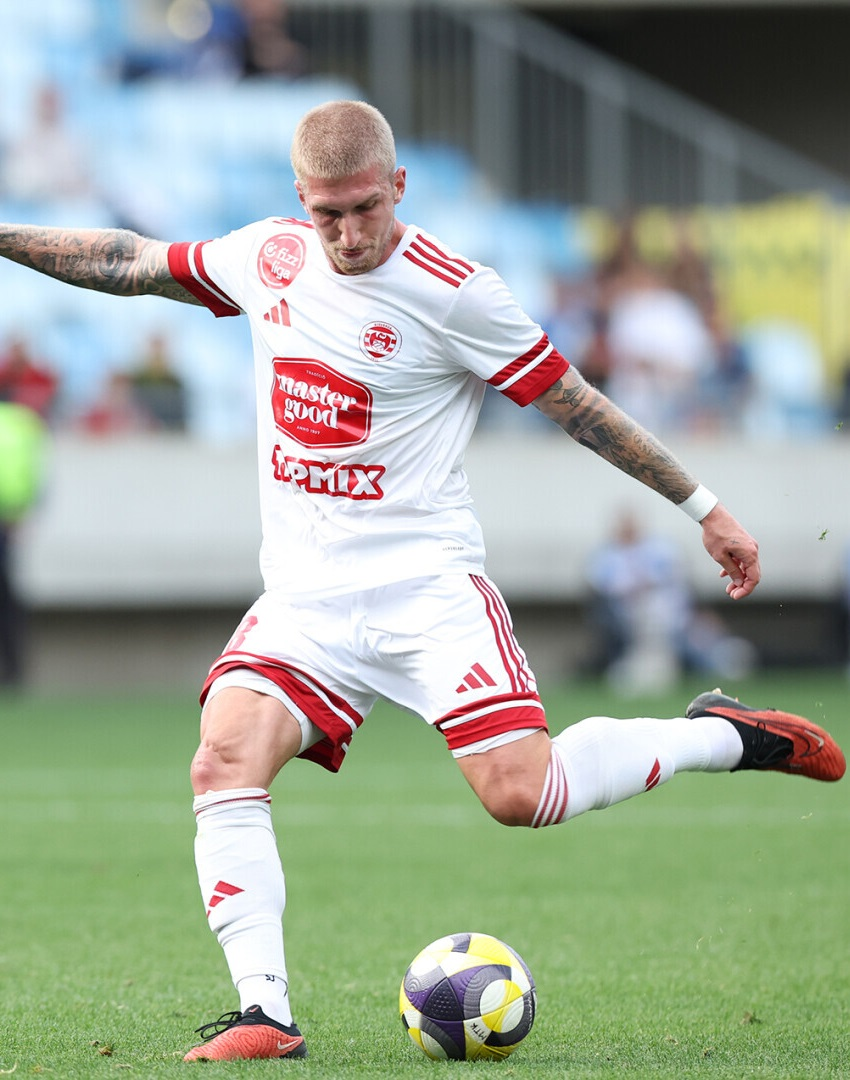
- Körmendi playing for Kisvárda in 2025

Personal information
- Date of birth: 30 June 2001 (age 25)
- Place of birth: Zalaegerszeg, Hungary
- Height: 1.87 m (6 ft 2 in)
- Position: Defender

Team information
- Current team: Tiszakécske (on loan from Kisvárda)
- Number: 18

Youth career
- 2008–2017: Zalaegerszeg
- 2017–2019: Puskás Akadémia

Senior career*
Years	Team	Apps	(Gls)
2018–2024	Puskás Akadémia II	32	(0)
2020–2021	→ Nafta 1903 (loan)	17	(0)
2021–2023	→ Csákvár (loan)	50	(3)
2023–2024	→ Kisvárda (loan)	17	(0)
2023–2024	→ Kisvárda II (loan)	1	(0)
2024–	Kisvárda	27	(0)
2024–	Kisvárda II	2	(1)
2026–	Tiszakécske (loan)	15	(0)

International career^{‡}
2017	Hungary U17	1	(0)
2019	Hungary U18	3	(1)
2019	Hungary U19	3	(0)
- * Club domestic league appearances and goals as of 31 May 2026 ‡ National team caps and goals as of 12 October 2019

Kevin Körmendi (born 30 June 2001) is a Hungarian professional footballer who plays as a defender for Nemzeti Bajnokság II club Tiszakécske on loan from Nemzeti Bajnokság I club Kisvárda. He represented Hungary at youth level.

== Career ==
Körmendi is a product of Zalaegerszeg and the Puskás Akadémia youth systems. In July 2020, he joined Slovenian club Nafta 1903 on a one-year loan from Hungarian side Puskás Akadémia.

On 23 June 2023, Körmendi was loaned out to Nemzeti Bajnokság I club Kisvárda in the 2023–24 season He made his debut for Kisvárda and also his first appearance in the Nemzeti Bajnokság I, coming on as a substitute against Zalaegerszeg at the ZTE Arena, where Kisvárda won the match against his former youth club. On 25 June 2024, following a one-season-long loan, Kisvárda announced that Körmendi permanently joined the club from Puskás Akadémia.

On 5 January 2026, he joined Nemzeti Bajnokság II club Tiszakécske on loan for the remainder of the 2025–26 season.

== Career statistics ==
As of match played 21 December 2025

Appearances and goals by club, season and competition
Club	Season	League			National cup (Note: Includes Magyar Kupa, Slovenian Football Cup)		Total	
Club	Season	Division	Apps	Goals	Apps	Goals	Apps	Goals
Puskás Akadémia II	2018–19	Nemzeti Bajnokság III	24	0	—		24	0
Puskás Akadémia II	2019–20	Nemzeti Bajnokság III	8	0	—		8	0
Puskás Akadémia II	Total		32	0	—		32	0
Nafta 1903 (loan)	2020–21	Slovenian Second League	17	0	3	0	20	0
Csákvár (loan)	2021–22	Nemzeti Bajnokság II	17	0	2	0	19	0
Csákvár (loan)	2022–23	Nemzeti Bajnokság II	33	3	1	0	34	3
Csákvár (loan)	Total		50	3	3	0	53	3
Kisvárda (loan)	2023–24	Nemzeti Bajnokság I	17	0	4	0	21	0
Kisvárda II (loan)	2023–24	Nemzeti Bajnokság III	1	0	—		1	0
Kisvárda	2024–25	Nemzeti Bajnokság II	18	0	4	0	22	0
Kisvárda	2025–26	Nemzeti Bajnokság I	9	0	1	0	10	0
Kisvárda	Total		27	0	5	0	32	0
Kisvárda II	2024–25	Nemzeti Bajnokság III	1	0	—		1	0
Kisvárda II	2025–26	Nemzeti Bajnokság III	1	1	—		1	1
Kisvárda II	Total		2	1	—		2	1
Tiszakécske (loan)	2025–26	Nemzeti Bajnokság II	0	0	—		0	0
Career total			146	4	15	0	161	4

=== International ===
Appearances and goals by national team and year
Team	Year	Total	
Team	Year	Apps	Goals
Hungary U17	2017	1	0
Hungary U18	2019	3	1
Hungary U19	2019	3	0
Career total		7	1

Scores and results list Hungary's goal tally first, score column indicates score after each Körmendi goal.

All youth international goals scored by Kevin Körmendi
No.	Team	Cap	Date	Venue	Opponent	Score	Result	Competition
1	Hungary U18	2	6 June 2019	Széktói Stadion, Kecskemét, Hungary	Sweden U18	4–0	6–0	Friendly

== Honours ==
Kisvárda

- Nemzeti Bajnokság II: 2024–25
