= Otto Hindrich =

Romanian footballer (born 2002)

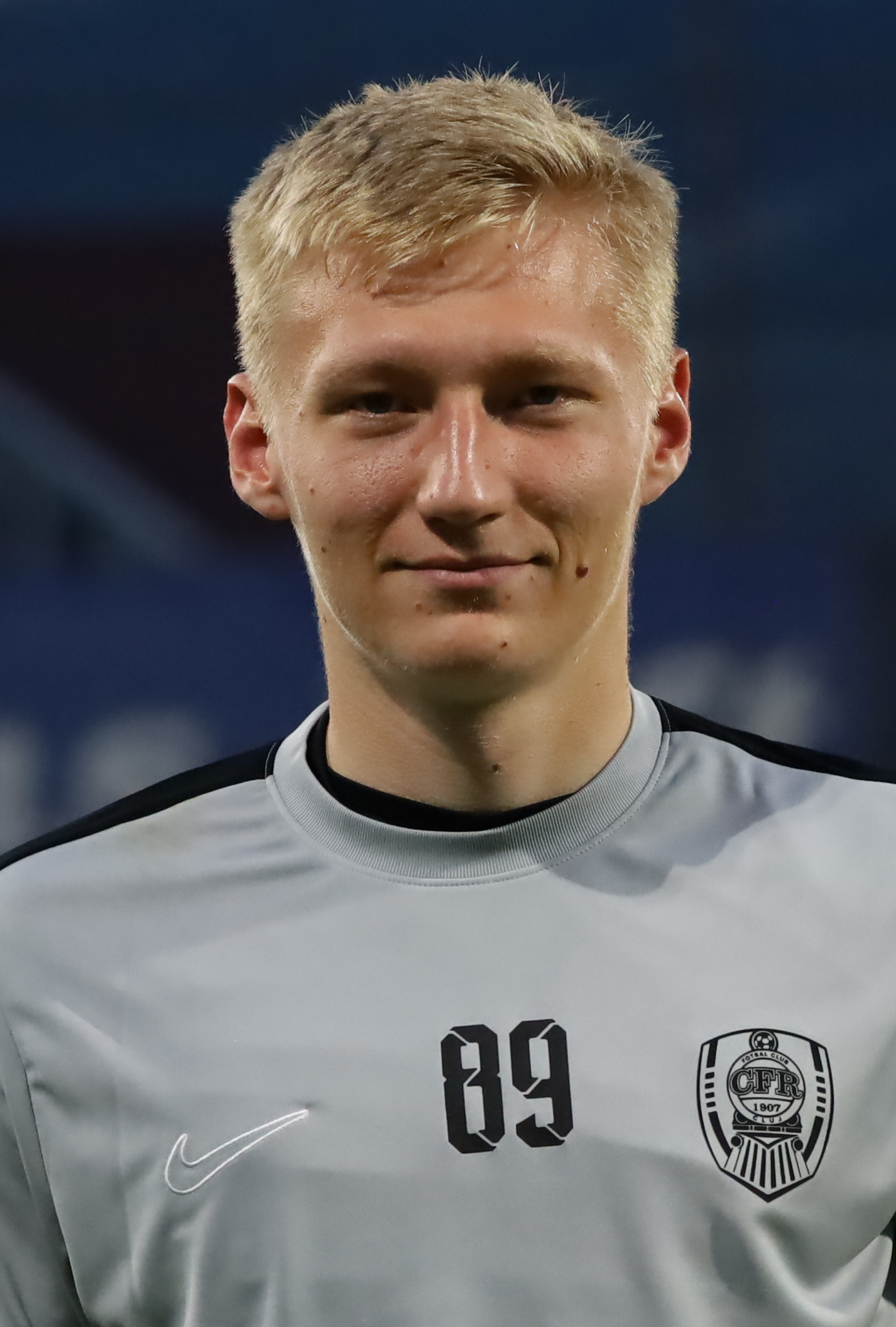
- Hindrich with CFR Cluj in 2024

Personal information
- Date of birth: 5 August 2002 (age 24)
- Place of birth: Cluj-Napoca, Romania
- Height: 1.93 m (6 ft 4 in)
- Position: Goalkeeper

Team information
- Current team: Legia Warsaw
- Number: 89

Youth career
- –2020: CFR Cluj

Senior career*
Years	Team	Apps	(Gls)
2020–2026	CFR Cluj	62	(0)
2020–2021	→ ASU Politehnica Timișoara (loan)	18	(0)
2022–2023	→ Kisvárda (loan)	25	(0)
2026–	Legia Warsaw	27	(0)

International career^{‡}
2020	Romania U18	2	(0)
2021	Romania U19	1	(0)
2021–2022	Romania U20	7	(0)
2022–2025	Romania U21	5	(0)
2026–	Romania	6	(0)
- * Club domestic league appearances and goals as of 8 November 2026 ‡ National team caps and goals as of 17 November 2026

Otto Hindrich (born 5 August 2002) is a Romanian professional footballer who plays as a goalkeeper for Ekstraklasa club Legia Warsaw and the Romania national team.

== Personal life ==
Hindrich stems from a Transylvanian Saxon family.

== Career statistics ==
=== Club ===
As of match played 8 November 2026

Appearances and goals by club, season and competition
Club	Season	League			National cup (Note: Includes Cupa României, Polish Cup)		Europe		Other		Total	
Club	Season	Division	Apps	Goals	Apps	Goals	Apps	Goals	Apps	Goals	Apps	Goals
CFR Cluj	2019–20	Liga I	1	0	0	0	—		—		1	0
CFR Cluj	2021–22	Liga I	19	0	0	0	0	0	0	0	19	0
CFR Cluj	2023–24	Liga I	0	0	1	0	0	0	—		1	0
CFR Cluj	2024–25	Liga I	24	0	6	0	0	0	—		30	0
CFR Cluj	2025–26	Liga I	18	0	0	0	8 (Note: Six appearances in UEFA Europa League, two appearances in UEFA Conference League)	0	1 (Note: Appearance in Supercupa României)	0	27	0
CFR Cluj	Total		62	0	7	0	8	0	1	0	78	0
ASU Politehnica Timișoara (loan)	2020–21	Liga II	18	0	2	0	—		—		20	0
Kisvárda (loan)	2022–23	Nemzeti Bajnokság I	25	0	0	0	0	0	—		25	0
Legia Warsaw	2025–26	Ekstraklasa	13	0	—		—		—		13	0
Legia Warsaw	2026–27	Ekstraklasa	14	0	1	0	—		—		15	0
Legia Warsaw	Total		27	0	1	0	—		—		28	0
Career total			131	0	10	0	8	0	1	0	150	0

=== International ===
As of match played 17 November 2026

Appearances and goals by national team and year
National team	Year	Apps	Goals
Romania
Romania	2026	6	0
Total		6	0

== Honours ==
CFR Cluj

- Liga I: 2019–20, 2021–22
- Cupa României: 2024–25
- Supercupa României runner-up: 2025
