= Mario Ilievski =

Macedonian footballer (born 2002)

Personal information
- Date of birth: 24 April 2002 (age 24)
- Place of birth: Skopje, Macedonia
- Height: 1.84 m (6 ft 0 in)
- Position: Forward

Team information
- Current team: Prishtina
- Number: 14

Youth career
- 2014–2018: Vardar

Senior career*
Years	Team	Apps	(Gls)
2018–2019	Vardar Negotino		
2019–2022	Septemvri Sofia	64	(27)
2019–2020	→ Tikvesh (loan)	7	(2)
2022–2024	Kisvárda	63	(8)
2024–2025	CSKA 1948	29	(5)
2025–	Prishtina	27	(13)

International career^{‡}
2018	Macedonia U17	3	(0)
2019	Macedonia U18	6	(2)
2019–2020	Macedonia U19	4	(1)
2020	Macedonia U20	1	(1)
2020–2024	North Macedonia U21	33	(7)
2024–	North Macedonia	1	(0)
- * Club domestic league appearances and goals as of 22 June 2026 ‡ National team caps and goals as of 7 September 2024

Mario Ilievski (Macedonian: Марио Илиевски; born 24 February 2002) is a Macedonian professional football player who plays as a striker for Football Superleague of Kosovo club Prishtina and the North Macedonia national team.

== Club career ==
On 6 July 2022, Ilievski signed for NB I club Kisvárda in Hungary. The same year on 31 July, he made his league debut in a 2–2 draw against Debrecen. Following a mutual agreement with his football agent, Ilievski terminated his contract with the club on 26 June 2024.

On 28 June 2024, Ilievski signed a contract for Bulgarian club CSKA 1948. One month later, on 28 July, he scored his first goal in a 1–1 league draw against Spartak Varna.

== International career ==
Ilievski has been a regular member of U-21 national team, where he also served as captain in a few matches.

On 7 September 2024, Ilievski debuted for the North Macedonia senior squad in a 1–1 Nations League draw against the Faroe Islands at Tórsvøllur, replacing Darko Churlinov in the 77th minute.
