= Dominik Kovačić =

Croatian footballers

Personal information
- Date of birth: 5 January 1994 (age 32)
- Place of birth: Zagreb, Croatia
- Height: 1.92 m (6 ft 4 in)
- Position: Defender

Team information
- Current team: Slaven Belupo
- Number: 4

Youth career
- NK Zagreb

Senior career*
Years	Team	Apps	(Gls)
–2017	NK Zagreb	73	(1)
2017	Lugano	0	(0)
2018	Sheriff	3	(0)
2018–2019	Široki Brijeg	46	(0)
2020–2021	Lokomotiva	20	(0)
2021	→ Vejle (loan)	15	(0)
2021–2022	FC U Craiova	38	(1)
2022–2024	Kisvárda	38	(1)
2024	Koper	0	(0)
2024–	Slaven Belupo	62	(2)
- * Club domestic league appearances and goals as of 15 June 2026

Dominik Kovačić (born 5 January 1994) is a Croatian professional footballer who plays as a defender for Slaven Belupo.

== Club career ==
In 2017, Kovačić signed for Swiss top flight side Lugano from NK Zagreb in the Croatian second division.

Before the 2018 season, he signed for Sheriff, Moldova's most successful club.

Before the second half of 2019/20, he signed for Lokomotiva in the Croatian top flight from Bosnia and Herzegovina team Široki Brijeg.

Before the second half of 2020/21, Kovačić was sent on loan to Vejle Boldklub in Denmark.
