= Bohdan Melnyk =

Ukrainian footballer

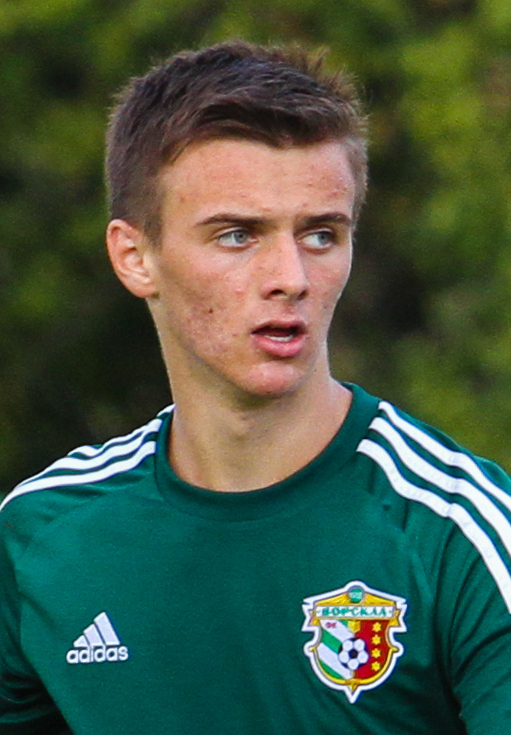

Personal information
- Full name: Bohdan Olehovych Melnyk
- Date of birth: 4 January 1997 (age 29)
- Place of birth: Volodymyr-Volynskyi, Ukraine
- Height: 1.76 m (5 ft 9 in)
- Position: Midfielder

Team information
- Current team: Kisvárda
- Number: 14

Youth career
- 2009–2014: BRW-VIK Volodymyr-Volynskyi

Senior career*
Years	Team	Apps	(Gls)
2014–2017	Vorskla Poltava	1	(0)
2017–2024	Kisvárda	193	(12)
2024–2025	Fehérvár	27	(1)
2025–	Kisvárda	30	(1)

International career^{‡}
2012	Ukraine U16	1	(1)
2016	Ukraine U19	2	(0)
- * Club domestic league appearances and goals as of 30 May 2026 ‡ National team caps and goals as of 4 August 2017

Bohdan Olehovych Melnyk (Ukrainian: Богдан Олегович Мельник; born 4 January 1997) is a Ukrainian professional footballer who plays as a midfielder for Kisvárda.

== Career ==
Melnyk is the product of the BRW-VIK Volodymyr-Volynskyi School System.

He made his debut for FC Vorskla in a game against FC Karpaty Lviv on 30 April 2016 in the Ukrainian Premier League.

He also played for Ukrainian different youth national football teams.

== Career statistics ==
As of 15 May 2021.

Appearances and goals by club, season and competition
Club	Season	League			Cup		Continental		Other		Total	
Club	Season	Division	Apps	Goals	Apps	Goals	Apps	Goals	Apps	Goals	Apps	Goals
Kisvárda	2017–18	Nemzeti Bajnokság II	27	2	3	0	—		—		30	3
Kisvárda	2018–19	Nemzeti Bajnokság I	24	1	3	0	—		—		27	1
Kisvárda	2019–20	Nemzeti Bajnokság I	26	2	3	0	—		—		29	2
Kisvárda	2020–21	Nemzeti Bajnokság I	29	1	3	0	—		—		32	1
Kisvárda	Total		106	6	12	0	0	0	0	0	118	6
Career total			106	6	12	0	0	0	0	0	118	6
