= Lucas (footballer, born 1989) =

Brazilian footballer (born 1989)

- Lucas playing for Tiszakécske in 2026

Personal information
- Full name: Lucas Marcolini Dantas Bertucci
- Date of birth: 6 May 1989 (age 37)
- Place of birth: Cornélio Procópio, Paraná, Brazil
- Height: 1.76 m (5 ft 9 in)
- Position: Midfielder

Team information
- Current team: Tiszakécske
- Number: 15

Youth career
- –2007: Athletico Paranaense
- 2007–2008: Debrecen

Senior career*
Years	Team	Apps	(Gls)
2008–2014	Debrecen	3	(0)
2013–2014	→ Békéscsaba (loan)	28	(6)
2014–2015	Bodva Moldava nad Bodvou	3	(0)
2015–2024	Kisvárda	219	(16)
2022	→ Diósgyőr (loan)	18	(0)
2024–2025	Kazincbarcika	28	(6)
2025–	Tiszakécske	24	(1)
- * Club domestic league appearances and goals as of 31 May 2026

Lucas Marcolini Dantas Bertucci, known simply as Lucas (born 6 May 1989) is a Brazilian midfielder player who plays for Hungarian Nemzeti Bajnokság II club Tiszakécske.

== Club career ==
He made his professional debut for Debrecen in the 2008–09 UEFA Cup against Young Boys Bern.

On 3 January 2022, Lucas joined Diósgyőr on loan.

== Club statistics ==
Appearances and goals by club, season and competition
Club	Season	League		Cup		League Cup		Europe		Total	
Club	Season	Apps	Goals	Apps	Goals	Apps	Goals	Apps	Goals	Apps	Goals
Debrecen
Debrecen	2008–09	0	0	3	2	4	1	1	0	8	3
Debrecen	2009–10	0	0	2	1	5	1	0	0	7	2
Debrecen	2010–11	0	0	3	0	2	0	0	0	5	0
Debrecen	2011–12	0	0	7	1	8	2	0	0	15	3
Debrecen	2012–13	3	0	3	1	5	1	2	0	13	2
Debrecen	Total	3	0	18	5	24	5	3	0	48	10
Békéscsaba
Békéscsaba	2013–14	28	6	4	2	3	0	0	0	35	8
Békéscsaba	Total	28	6	4	2	3	0	0	0	35	8
Bodva Moldava
Bodva Moldava	2014–15	3	0	0	0	—		—		3	0
Bodva Moldava	Total	3	0	0	0	0	0	0	0	3	0
Kisvárda
Kisvárda	2014–15	14	4	2	0	—		—		16	4
Kisvárda	2015–16	22	3	1	0	—		—		23	3
Kisvárda	2016–17	37	4	0	0	—		—		37	4
Kisvárda	2017–18	37	2	3	0	—		—		40	2
Kisvárda	2018–19	31	2	3	0	—		—		34	2
Kisvárda	2019–20	31	4	3	0	—		—		34	4
Kisvárda	2020–21	19	0	3	0	—		—		22	0
Kisvárda	Total	191	19	15	0	0	0	0	0	206	19
Career total		225	25	37	7	27	5	3	0	292	37

Updated to games played as of 15 May 2021.
