= Miloš Vranjanin =

Serbian footballer

Personal information
- Date of birth: 11 June 1996 (age 30)
- Place of birth: Belgrade, FR Yugoslavia
- Height: 1.90 m (6 ft 3 in)
- Position: Defender

Team information
- Current team: Smederevo 1924
- Number: 5

Youth career
- Rad
- 2014: Brodarac
- 2015: Napredak Kruševac

Senior career*
Years	Team	Apps	(Gls)
2015–2016	Radnički Obrenovac	25	(6)
2017–2018	Teleoptik	41	(1)
2018–2020	Metalac Gornji Milanovac	62	(7)
2021–2022	Riga	25	(1)
2022–2023	Kisvárda	7	(0)
2023–2024	Radnik Surdulica	31	(0)
2024	Panevėžys	5	(0)
2025	Sloga Doboj	8	(1)
2026–	Smederevo 1924	11	(0)
- * Club domestic league appearances and goals as of 14 May 2026

Miloš Vranjanin (born 11 June 1996) is a Serbian professional footballer who plays as a defender for Smederevo 1924.

== Career ==
He made his Serbian Super Liga debut with Metalac Gornji Milanovac in August 2020.

On 27 June 2022, Vranjanin signed with Kisvárda in Hungary.

On 12 September 2024, Vranjanin signed with Lithuanian club Panevėžys until the end of the 2025 season. On 26 September 2024, he made his A Lyga debut in a 2–1 loss to Šiauliai.
