= Várkerti Stadion =

Football stadium in Kisvárda, Hungary

Coordinates: 48°13′32″N 22°05′17″E

Várkert Stadium
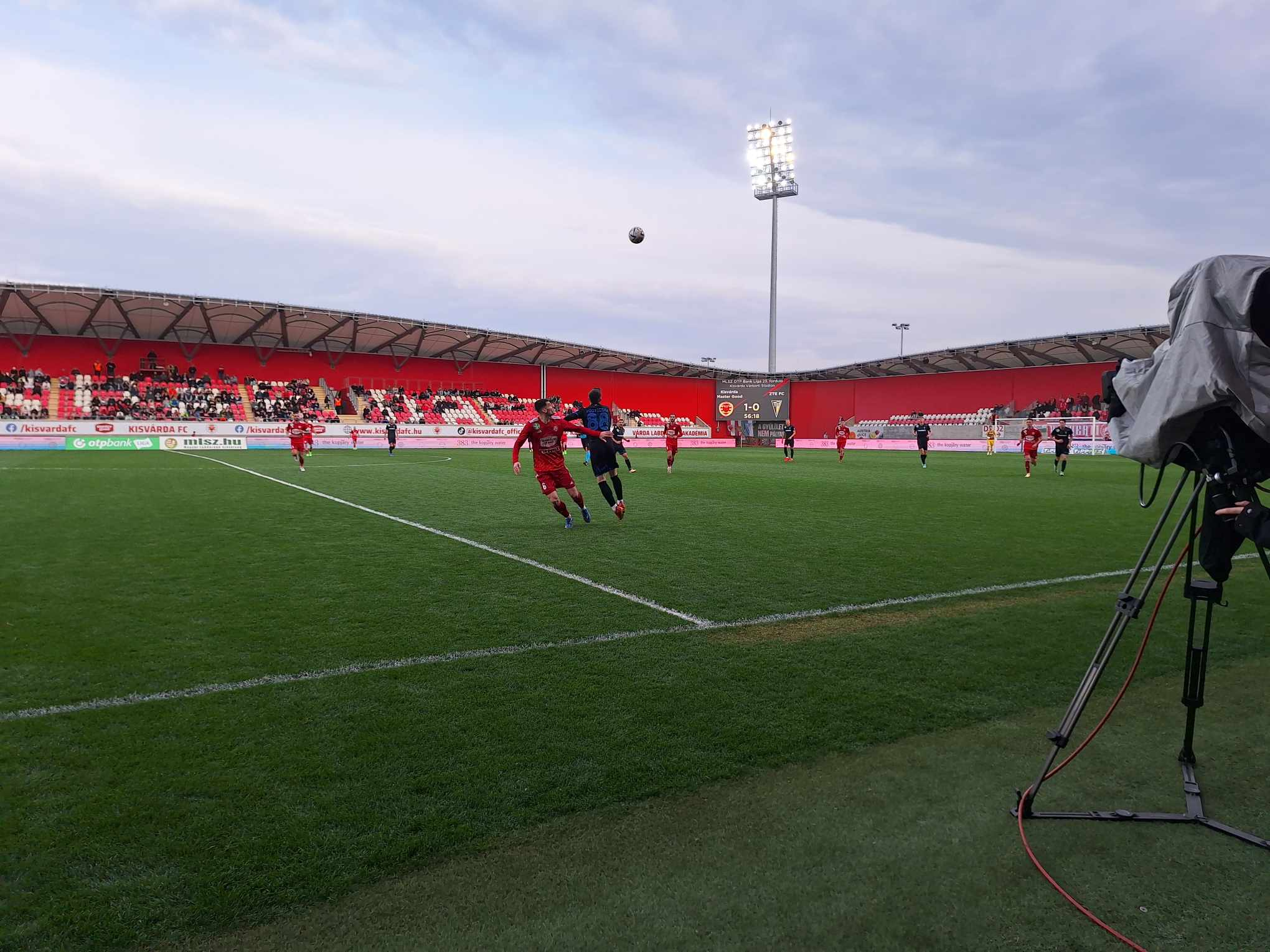
- Interactive map of Várkert Stadium
- Full name: Várkert Stadion
- Location: Kisvárda, Hungary
- Owner: Kisvárda FC
- Capacity: 2,850
- Surface: Grass; Field
- Record attendance: 3,385 (Kisvárda v Mezőkövesd, 19 May 2019)
- Field size: 105 m × 68 m (344 ft × 223 ft)

Construction
- Opened: 2018
- Cost: 2.5 billion HUF

Tenants
- Kisvárda FC; Nyíregyháza Spartacus (2023)

Website
- www.magyarfutball.hu

Várkert Stadium is a football stadium in Kisvárda, Hungary. The UEFA category 3 arena is home to the association football side Kisvárda FC. The stadium has a capacity of 2,850.

== History ==
The stadium was planned to be built for HUF 120 million in 2014, however step by step it managed to cost taxpayers a lot more. After categorised as an economically significant investment, another HUF 800 million was awarded in 2014, which grew to 1.5 billion and then 2 billion in a short time. In the end a further 473 million HUF was spent on building a heat pipe system from the nearby thermal water complex - making the total investment HUF 2.5 billion - basically 1 million for each spectator seat. A typical example how one politician's dream can make others pay for it.

The first Nemzeti Bajnokság I match was played against Ferencváros on the 4th match day of the 2018–19 Nemzeti Bajnokság I.

The first Magyar Kupa match was played on 27 February 2018 in the 2018–19 Magyar Kupa season against Ferencváros. The result was 1-1.

Nyíregyháza hosted Szeged-Csanád Grosics Akadémia on the 38 match day of the 2022–23 Nemzeti Bajnokság II season at the Várkerti Stadion on 27 May 2023.

== Milestone matches ==
11 August 2018	Kisvárda (Hungary)	0–2	(Hungary) Ferencváros	First Nemzeti Bajnokság I match
		Report	55' Leandro; 75' Lanzafame	Attendance: 3,300; Referee: Csaba Pintér (Hungary)

26 February 2019	Kisvárda (Hungary)	1–1	(Hungary) Ferencváros	First Magyar Kupa match
20:00 CET	Grozav 67' (p.)	Report	33' Gorriarán	Referee: Róbert Nagy

== Gallery ==
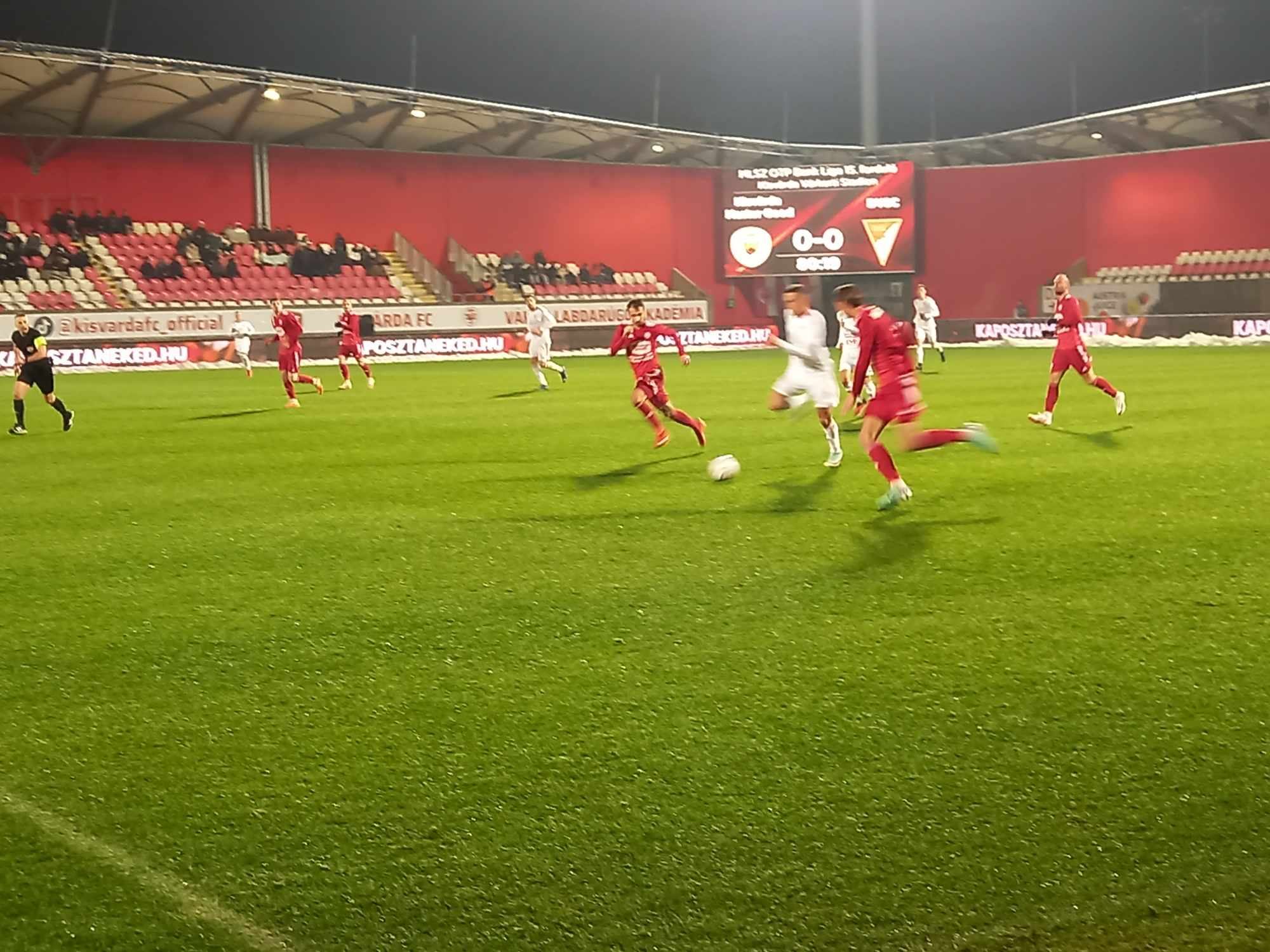
Kisvárda host Debrecen on 2 December 2023

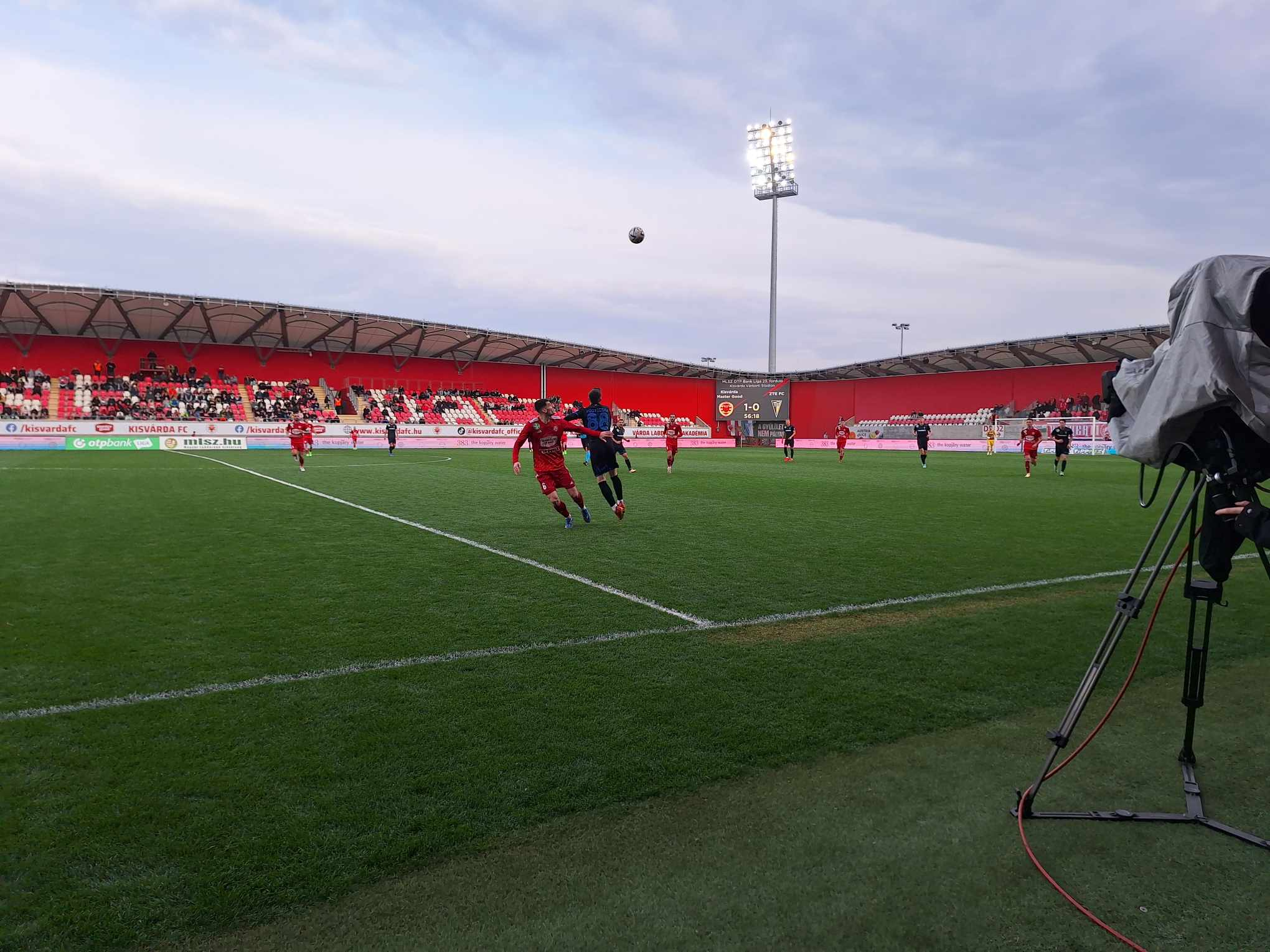
The stadium in 2024

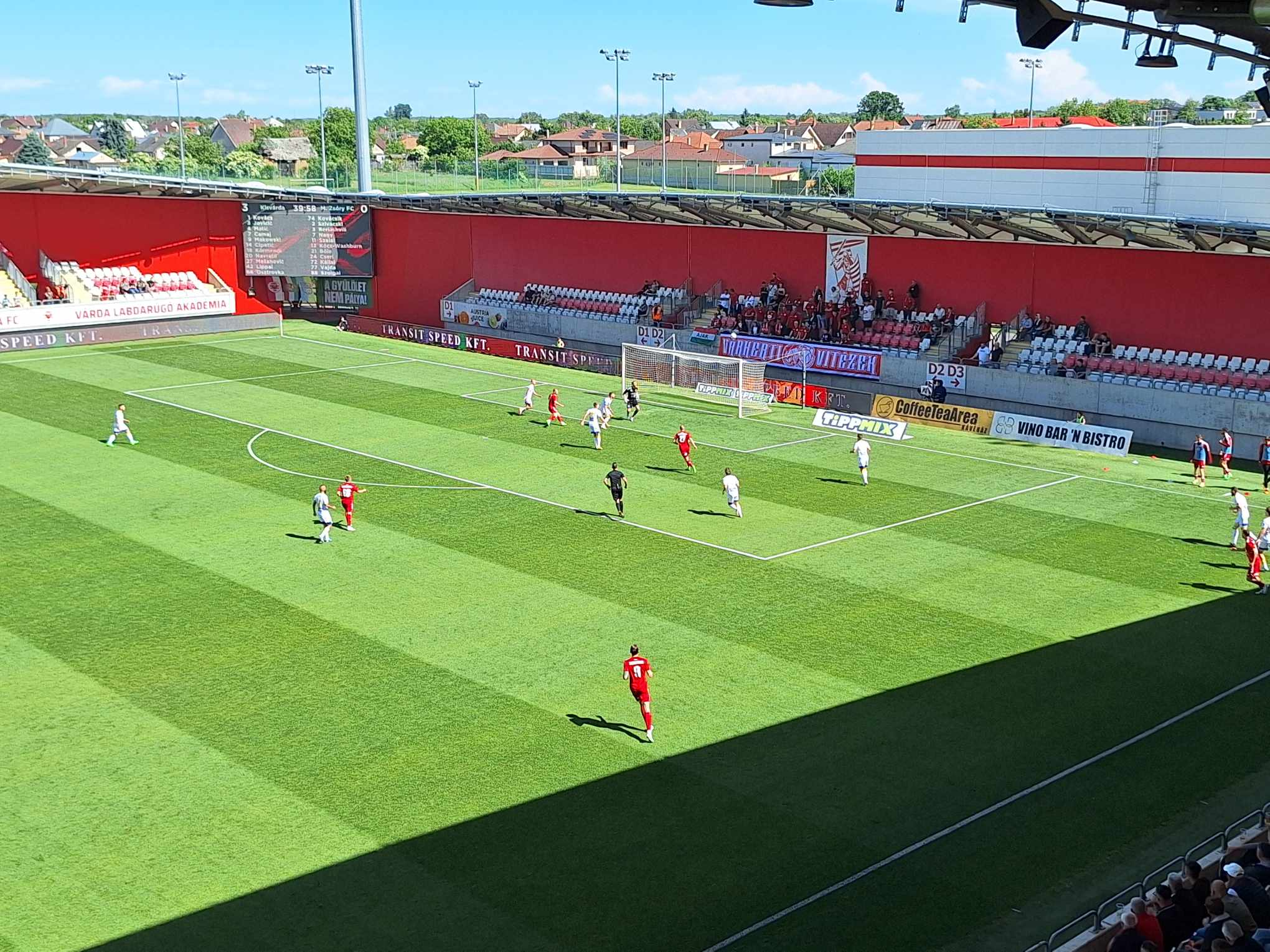
The stadium in 2024

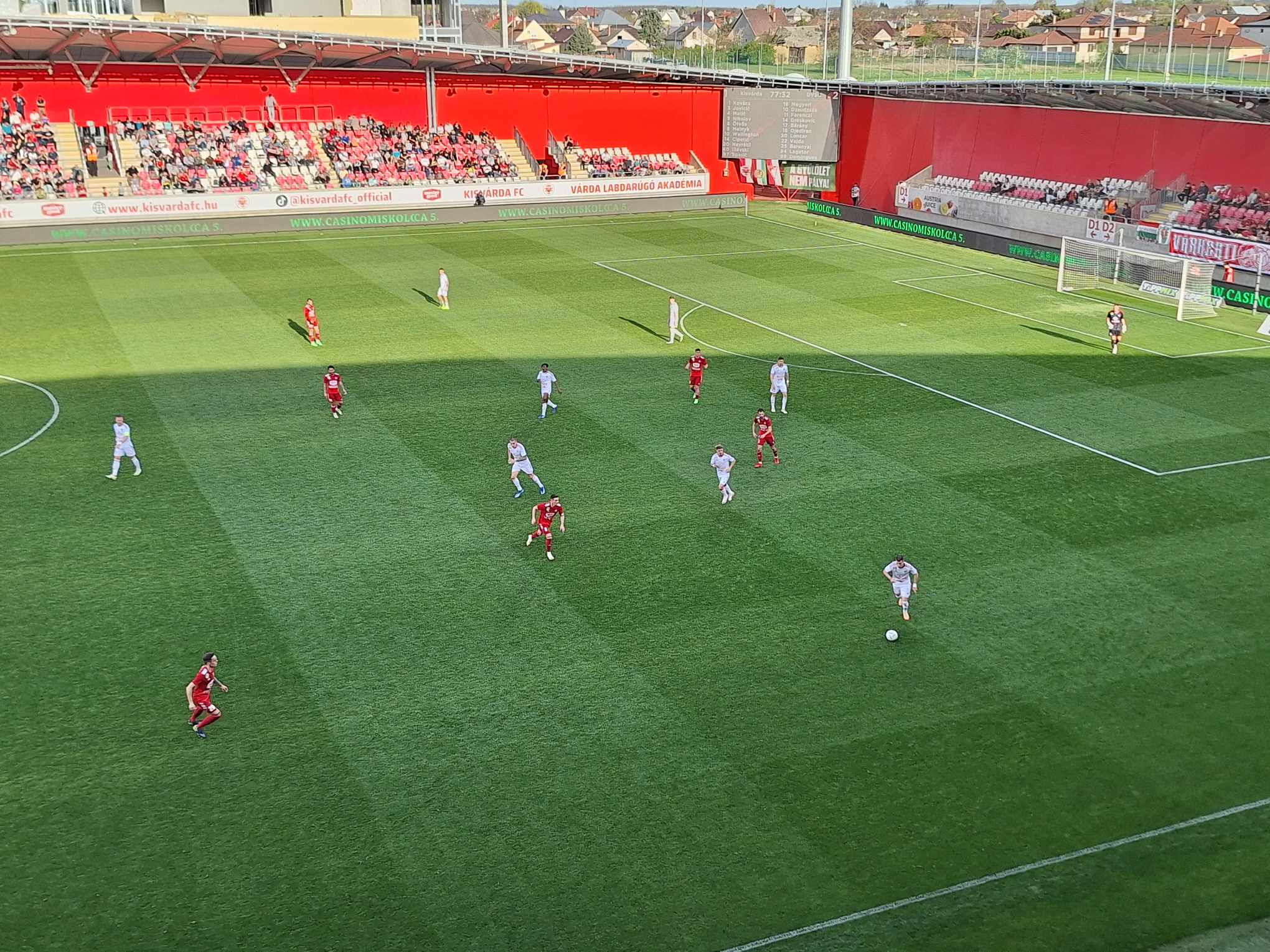
The stadium in 2024

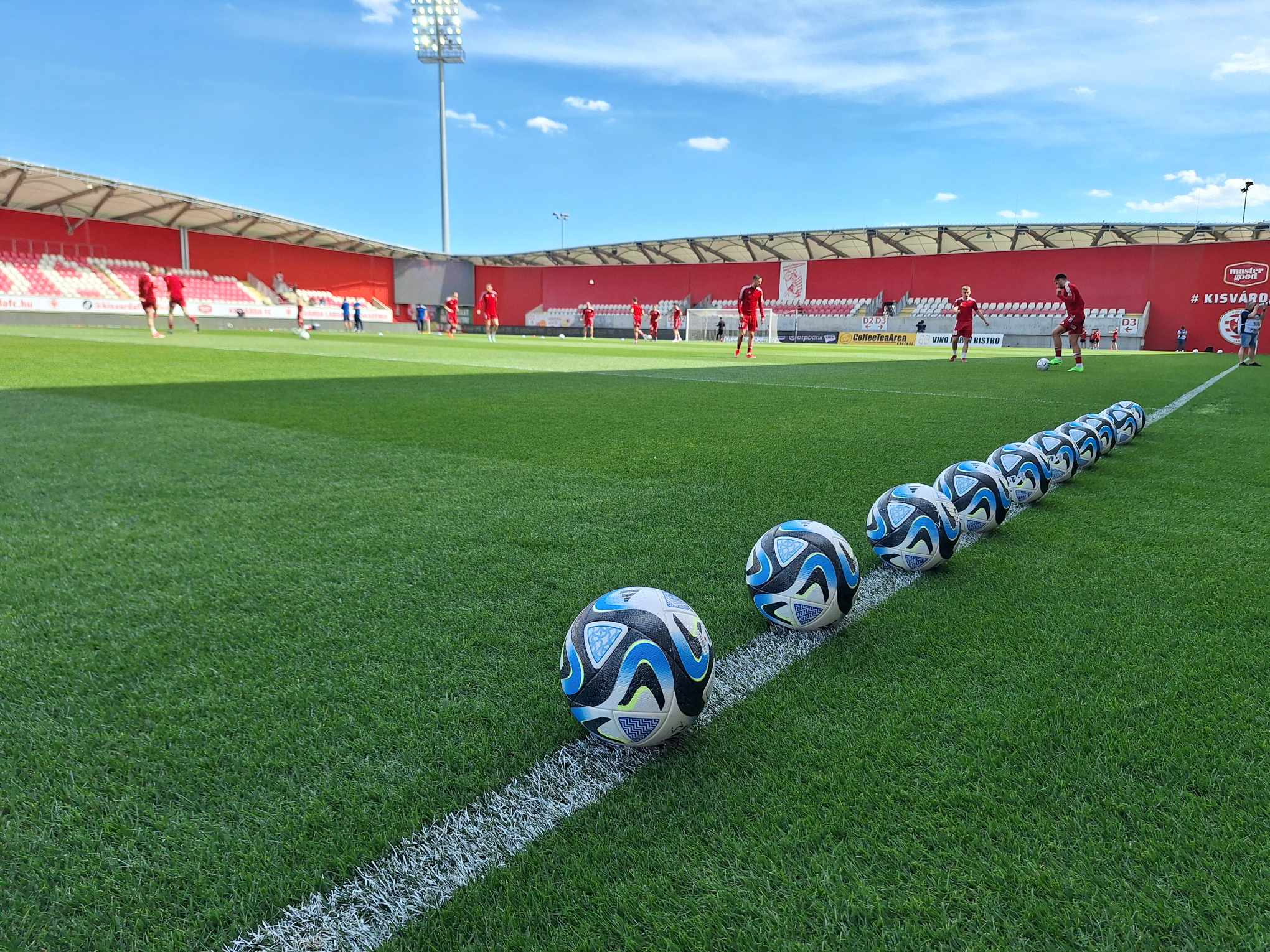
The stadium in 2024

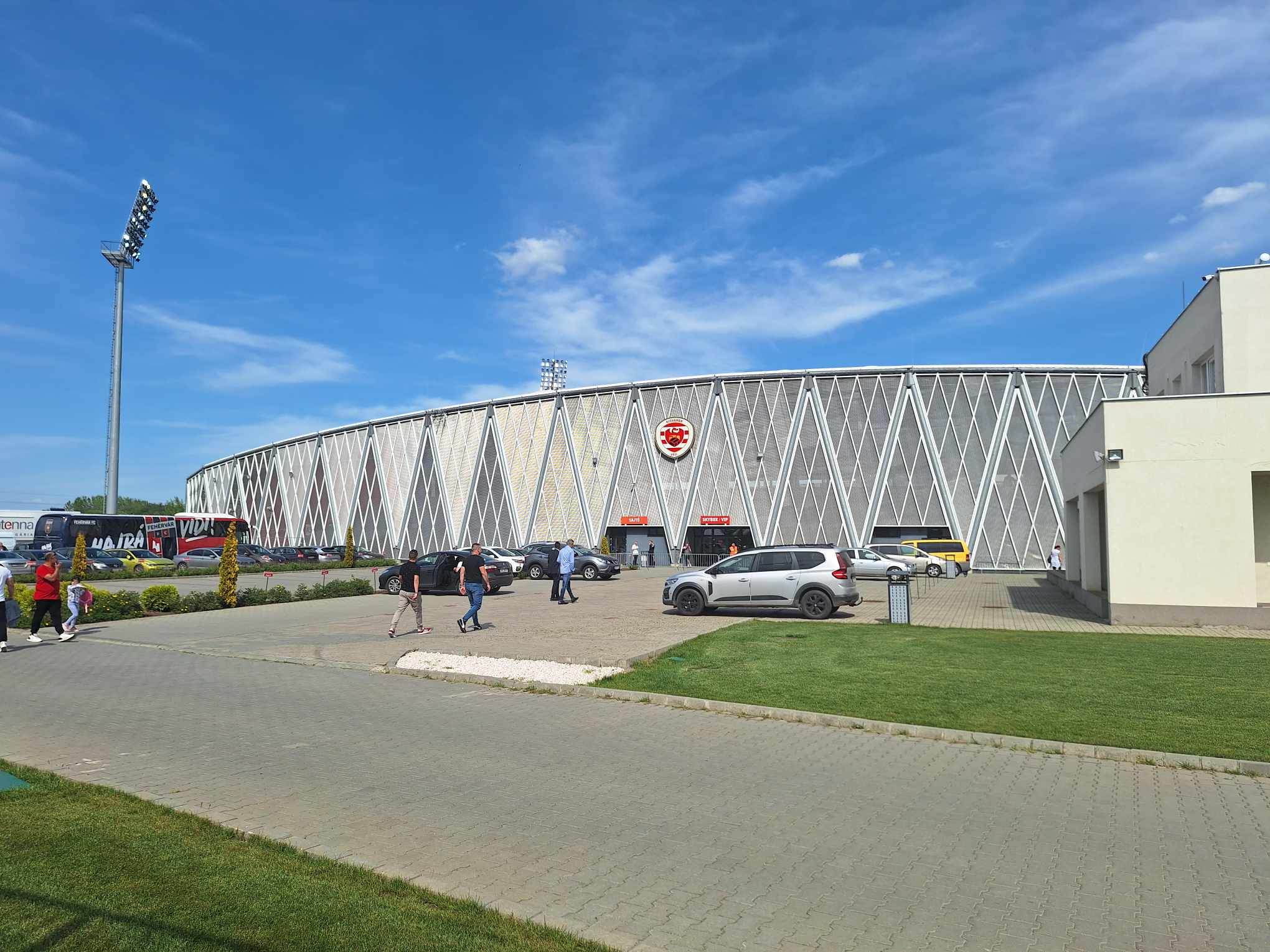
The stadium in 2024

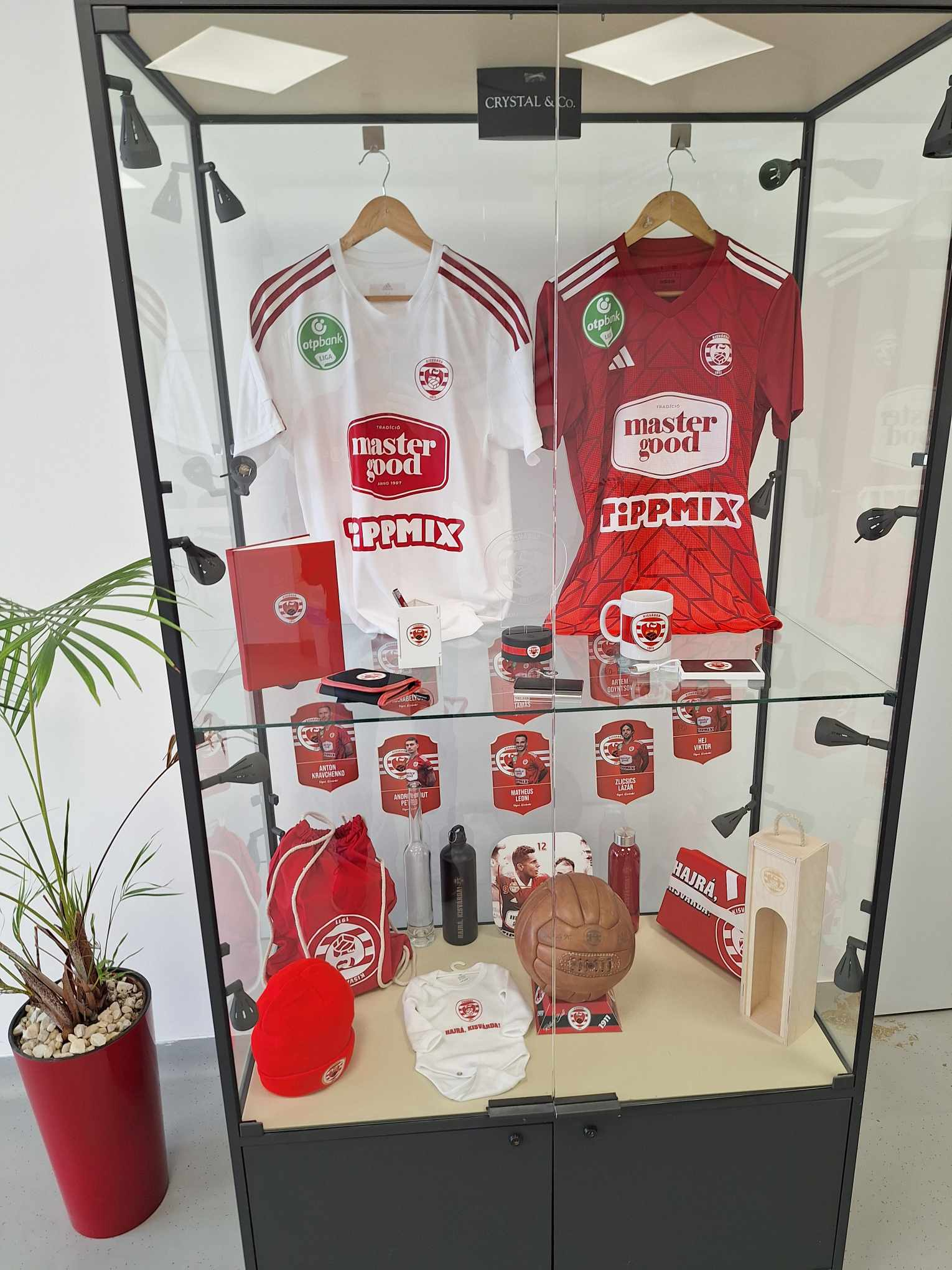
The stadium in 2024
