= Jaroslav Navrátil (footballer) =

Czech footballer (born 1991)

Personal information
- Full name: Jaroslav Navrátil
- Date of birth: 30 December 1991 (age 34)
- Place of birth: Hustopeče, Czech Republic
- Height: 1.80 m (5 ft 11 in)
- Position: Right winger

Team information
- Current team: Nyíregyháza
- Number: 7

Youth career
- –2009: Hodonín–Šardice
- 2009–2013: Břeclav

Senior career*
Years	Team	Apps	(Gls)
2013–2018	Heracles Almelo	86	(9)
2018–2020	Go Ahead Eagles	64	(11)
2020–2024	Kisvárda	117	(15)
2024–	Nyíregyháza	21	(3)
- * Club domestic league appearances and goals as of 19 June 2025

Jaroslav Navrátil (born 30 December 1991) is a Czech professional footballer who plays as a right winger for Nyíregyháza in the Hungarian Nemzeti Bajnokság I. He formerly played for the Dutch teams Heracles Almelo and Go Ahead Eagles.

== Career statistics ==
As of 15 May 2021.

Appearances and goals by club, season and competition
Club	Season	League			Cup		Continental		Other		Total	
Club	Season	Division	Apps	Goals	Apps	Goals	Apps	Goals	Apps	Goals	Apps	Goals
Heracles	2012–13	Eredivisie	4	0	0	0	—		—		4	0
Heracles	2013–14	Eredivisie	1	0	1	0	—		—		2	0
Heracles	2014–15	Eredivisie	16	2	2	0	—		—		18	2
Heracles	2015–16	Eredivisie	28	5	1	0	—		—		29	5
Heracles	2016–17	Eredivisie	26	1	1	0	2	0	—		29	1
Heracles	2017–18	Eredivisie	11	1	3	0	—		—		14	1
Heracles	Total		86	9	8	0	2	0	0	0	96	9
Go Ahead Eagles	2018–19	Eerste Divisie	35	8	2	1	—		4	1	41	10
Go Ahead Eagles	2019–20	Eerste Divisie	29	3	4	1	—		—		33	4
Go Ahead Eagles	Total		64	11	6	1	0	0	4	1	74	14
Kisvárda	2020–21	Nemzeti Bajnokság I	28	4	5	1	—		—		33	5
Kisvárda	Total		28	4	5	1	0	0	0	0	33	5
Career total			178	24	19	2	2	0	4	1	203	28
