= Driton Camaj =

Montenegrin footballer (born 1997)

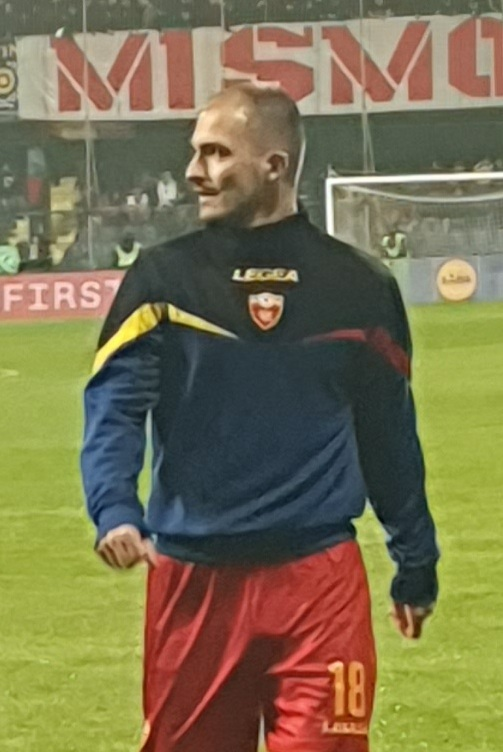
- Camaj with Montenegro in 2023

Personal information
- Date of birth: 7 March 1997 (age 29)
- Place of birth: Podgorica, FR Yugoslavia
- Height: 1.79 m (5 ft 10 in)
- Positions: Winger; forward

Team information
- Current team: Muğlaspor
- Number: 11

Youth career
- Budućnost

Senior career*
Years	Team	Apps	(Gls)
2015	Budućnost	1	(1)
2015	Inter Zaprešić	2	(0)
2015–2016	Dečić	11	(0)
2016–2018	Budućnost	41	(1)
2018–2019	Lovćen	34	(5)
2019–2020	Iskra Danilovgrad	29	(5)
2020–2025	Kisvárda	115	(19)
2025	Kecskemét	16	(5)
2025	Astana	8	(1)
2026	Novi Pazar	17	(7)
2026–	Muğlaspor	7	(0)

International career^{‡}
2014	Montenegro U17	3	(0)
2016	Montenegro U19	5	(1)
2016–2018	Montenegro U21	4	(0)
2022–	Montenegro	32	(2)
- * Club domestic league appearances and goals as of 18 September 2026 ‡ National team caps and goals as of 13 October 2025

Driton Camaj (Montenegrin: Дритон Цамај; born 7 March 1997) is a Montenegrin professional footballer who plays as a left winger for Muğlaspor in the TFF 1.Lig and the Montenegro national football team.

== Club career ==
Camaj first played competitive football with Budućnost in Podgorica. In July 2015, Camaj went on a trial with Croatian club Inter Zaprešić at the age of 18, during which he scored in a friendly match against NK Rudeš. As a result, he signed with Inter Zaprešić. However, he only played two league matches with Inter Zaprešić, and subsequently returned to Montenegro where he spent a half season with Dečić from Tuzi. In the summer of 2016, Camaj returned to Budućnost. On 29 January 2018, Camaj signed a new three-year contract with Budućnost.

On 27 May 2025, Kecskemét announced the departure of Camaj.

On 11 July 2025, Kazakhstan Premier League club Astana announced the signing of Camaj.

== International career ==
Camaj was eligible to play for the Albania national football team due to being an ethnic Albanian and the Montenegro national football team.Camaj played for Montenegro's U19 team in the 2016 UEFA Euro U19 Championship qualifiers, scoring a goal against Hungary in the group stage of qualification.

Camaj debuted for the Montenegro U21 in 2016. He played in a friendly match with Bosnia and Herzegovina U21 on 10 November 2016, which Bosnia won 2–0. In May 2017, Camaj was called up by Montenegro U21 coach Mojaš Radonjić for the Valeriy Lobanovskyi tournament in Ukraine. In the tournament, Camaj played against Slovenia U21 and Ukraine U21. After the tournament, Camaj played in a friendly match against Georgia U21 on 12 June 2017. In 2021 the Albania national football team was interested in calling Camaj up.

Camaj scored his first goal for Montenegro in a friendly match against the Czech Republic on 20 June 2023.

On 18 October 2023 a clash broke out at an international friendly as Montenegrin fans were breaking chairs and throwing them at the Serbian police, who retaliated. The clash was thought to have been caused due to Montenegro fielding three players of Albanian descent, one of whom was Camaj.

== Career statistics ==
=== International ===
List of international goals scored by Driton Camaj
No.	Date	Venue	Opponent	Score	Result	Competition
1	20 June 2023	Podgorica City Stadium, Podgorica, Montenegro	Czech Republic	1–2	1–4	Friendly
2	9 September 2024	Gradski stadion, Nikšić, Montenegro	Wales	1–2	1–2	2024–25 UEFA Nations League B
