= Kristopher Vida =

Hungarian footballer (born 1995)

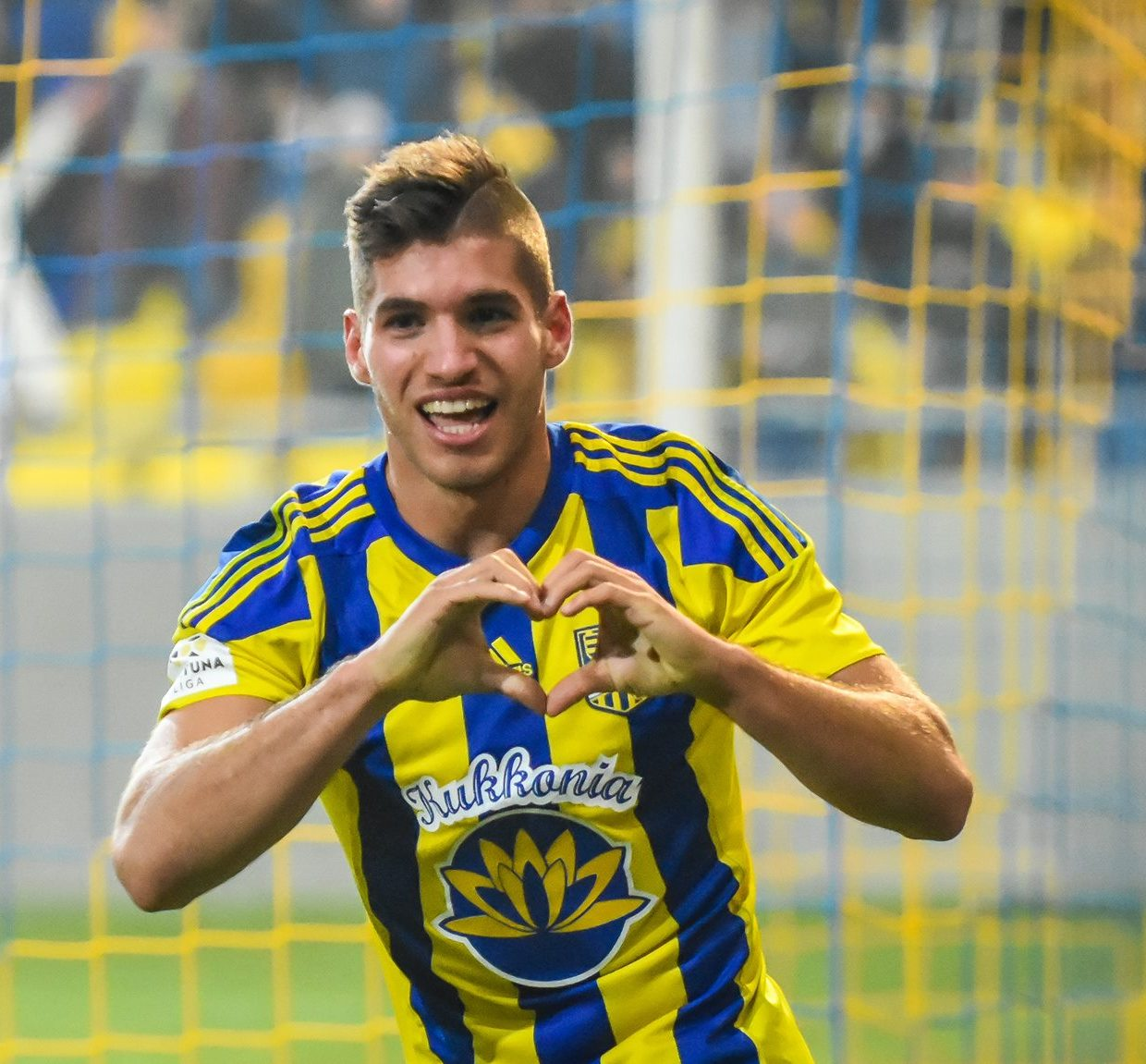
- Vida in 2016

Personal information
- Date of birth: 23 June 1995 (age 31)
- Place of birth: Budapest, Hungary
- Height: 1.76 m (5 ft 9 in)
- Position: Winger

Team information
- Current team: CSM Olimpia Satu Mare
- Number: 27

Youth career
- 2000–2005: Goldball 94
- 2005–2009: Vasas
- 2007: → Fehérvár (loan)
- 2009–2011: Budapest Honvéd
- 2011–2013: Twente

Senior career*
Years	Team	Apps	(Gls)
2013–2014	Jong Twente	19	(5)
2014–2016	De Graafschap	62	(10)
2016–2020	DAC Dunajská Streda	106	(29)
2020–2022	Piast Gliwice	57	(4)
2022–2024	Kisvárda	31	(1)
2024	→ Nyíregyháza (loan)	8	(1)
2024–2025	Tatabánya	20	(1)
2026–	CSM Olimpia Satu Mare	23	(6)

International career
2010	Hungary U16	2	(0)
2012	Hungary U17	3	(1)
2013	Hungary U18	1	(0)
2013	Hungary U19	3	(0)
2014	Hungary U20	1	(0)
- * Club domestic league appearances and goals as of 31 October 2026

Kristopher Vida (born 23 June 1995) is a Hungarian professional footballer who plays as a winger for Liga II club CSM Olimpia Satu Mare.

== Club career ==
=== Early career ===
Vida started his career by joining Goldball FC's youth team in 2000 at the age of four. He stayed there for five years until he moved to Vasas Budapest. After a four years in the club's youth system, with a short stint at Videoton FC, he moved to Honvéd Budapest in 2009.

=== Netherlands ===
In 2011, he was signed by Dutch side Twente Enschede after a successful trial. He made his professional debut in the club's second team playing in Eerste Divisie in 2013. At the end of the season, he changed his club and joined De Graafschap in the second division. In the 2014–15 season, as a starter he helped the club win promotion to the Dutch first division, Eredivisie. Unfortunately, the team did not perform well, resulting in relegation at the end of the 2015–16 season, following which Vida left the club. and Kristopher Vida left the club.

=== DAC Dunajská Streda ===
On 29 June 2016, Vida signed with Slovak Super Liga team DAC Dunajská Streda. His time with Dunaszerdahely started off with some difficulties, but the role and importance of the player changed with Csaba László's arrival. In his first season in Fortuna League, he scored five goals in 29 matches, contributing to the club's unbeaten run of 17 games.

=== Piast Gliwice ===
On 26 February 2020, he signed a three-and-a-half-year deal with defending Polish champions Piast Gliwice. On 9 August 2022, he left the club by mutual consent.

=== Kisvárda ===
On 9 August 2022, Vida returned to Hungary and signed with Kisvárda. On 15 February 2024, Vida was loaned by Nyíregyháza.

== Honours ==
Nyíregyháza

- Nemzeti Bajnokság II: 2023–24
