= Mykhaylo Hotra =

Ukrainian footballer

Personal information
- Full name: Mykhaylo Ivanovych Hotra
- Date of birth: 20 April 2000 (age 26)
- Place of birth: Ukraine
- Height: 1.90 m (6 ft 3 in)
- Position: Goalkeeper

Youth career
- 2012–2016: Uzhhorod
- 2016–2017: Karpaty Lviv

Senior career*
Years	Team	Apps	(Gls)
2017–2018	Karpaty Lviv	0	(0)
2019	Serednye	6	(0)
2019–2022	Uzhhorod	44	(0)
2022–2023	Kisvárda	0	(0)
- * Club domestic league appearances and goals as of 16 December 2023

Mykhaylo Ivanovych Hotra (Ukrainian: Михайло Іванович Готра; born 20 April 2000) is a Ukrainian professional footballer who plays as a goalkeeper.
