= Rafał Makowski =

Polish footballer (born 1996)

Personal information
- Full name: Rafał Makowski
- Date of birth: 5 August 1996 (age 30)
- Place of birth: Warsaw, Poland
- Height: 1.91 m (6 ft 3 in)
- Position: Midfielder

Team information
- Current team: Pogoń Siedlce
- Number: 10

Youth career
- 2004–2014: Legia Warsaw

Senior career*
Years	Team	Apps	(Gls)
2014–2017	Legia Warsaw II	36	(1)
2015–2018	Legia Warsaw	7	(0)
2016	→ Pogoń Siedlce (loan)	15	(0)
2017–2018	→ Zagłębie Sosnowiec (loan)	18	(1)
2018–2020	Radomiak Radom	65	(17)
2020–2022	Śląsk Wrocław	24	(1)
2020	Śląsk Wrocław II	5	(1)
2022–2024	Kisvárda	74	(8)
2024–2026	GKS Tychy	40	(1)
2026–	Pogoń Siedlce	0	(0)

International career
2015	Poland U19	3	(0)
2015–2017	Poland U20	9	(2)
2015	Poland U21	2	(0)
- * Club domestic league appearances and goals as of 20:16, 3 February 2026 (UTC)

Rafał Makowski (born 5 August 1996) is a Polish professional footballer who plays as a midfielder for I liga club Pogoń Siedlce.

== Honours ==
Legia Warsaw

- Ekstraklasa: 2015–16
- Polish Cup: 2015–16

Radomiak Radom

- II liga: 2018–19
