= 2025–26 Kisvárda FC season =

Kisvárda
2025–26 season
- Manager: Attila Révész (From 10 October 2025); Máté Gerliczki (From 31 May 2025 to 30 September 2025)
- Stadium: Várkerti Stadion
- Nemzeti Bajnokság I: 8th
- Magyar Kupa: Round of 64
- Top goalscorer: League: Bíró (6); All: Bíró (6)
- Highest home attendance: 3,150 (v Ferencváros, Nemzeti Bajnokság, R5, 4 December 2025), (v Ferencváros, Nemzeti Bajnokság, R22, 22 March 2026)
- Lowest home attendance: 1,250 (v MTK, Nemzeti Bajnokság, R19, 24 January 2026)
- Average home league attendance: 2,119
- Biggest win: 3 goals, (3–0) v Újpest (H), Nemzeti Bajnokság, R15, 30 November 2025
- Biggest defeat: 4 goals, (1–5) v Paks (H), Nemzeti Bajnokság, R2, 3 August 2025, (0–4) v MTK (A), Nemzeti Bajnokság, R8, 28 September 2025
- All statistics correct as of 2 May 2026.

The 2025–26 season is Kisvárda FC's 7th competitive season, 1st consecutive season in the Nemzeti Bajnokság I and 23rd year in existence as a football club. In addition to the domestic league, Kisvárda participate in this season's editions of the Magyar Kupa.

Magyar Kupa

In the domestic cup (Magyar Kupa) Kisvárda joined the competition in the Round of 64 and they lost 3–1 away against second division (Nemzeti Bajnokság II) Ajka.

== Kits ==
Supplier: adidas / Sponsor: Tippmix

Home	Away	Third

Goalkeeper^{1}

== First team squad ==
As of 16 January 2026

Note: Flags indicate national team as defined under FIFA eligibility rules; some limited exceptions apply. Players may hold more than one non-FIFA nationality.

No.	Pos.	Nation	Player
1	GK	HUN	Marcell Kovács
3	DF	BIH	Aleksandar Jovičić (vice-captain)
5	DF	CZE	Martin Chlumecký
6	MF	NGR	Ridwan Popoola
7	FW	HUN	Szilárd Szabó (on loan from Ferencváros)
8	MF	HUN	István Soltész
10	FW	HUN	Dominik Soltész
11	MF	MNE	Marko Matanović
14	MF	UKR	Bohdan Melnyk
15	DF	UKR	Myroslav Babyak
16	MF	HUN	Gábor Molnár
18	MF	HUN	Kevin Körmendi
20	FW	HUN	László Scsadej
21	GK	HUN	Alex Hrabina
23	DF	SVK	Sinan Medgyes
24	DF	BIH	Branimir Cipetić (vice-captain)
26	DF	SRB	Nikola Radmanovac

No.	Pos.	Nation	Player
27	FW	BIH	Jasmin Mešanović (captain)
29	FW	HUN	Bence Bíró
30	GK	UKR	Illya Popovych
42	DF	HUN	Tibor Lippai
44	MF	HUN	Raúl Stefan
50	DF	HUN	Bálint Oláh
55	MF	HUN	Krisztián Nagy
66	MF	HUN	Maxim Osztrovka
70	MF	HUN	Levente Szőr
80	MF	FRA	Hianga'a Mbock
86	FW	HUN	Soma Novothny
95	FW	HUN	Filip Pintér (on loan from (Hungary) Vasas)
96	MF	HUN	Gennadiy Szikszai
98	FW	HUN	Máté Gyurkó
99	FW	BUL	Tonislav Yordanov
—	FW	UKR	Yaroslav Helesh
—	GK	HUN	Zsombor Papp

== Transfers ==
=== Summer ===
In
Date	No.	Pos.	Nat.	Player	Moving from	Fee	Ref.
12 June 2025	55	MF	Hungary	Krisztián Nagy	Kecskemét (NB II)	Undisclosed	
16 June 2025	50	DF	Hungary	Bálint Oláh	Budafok (NB II)	Undisclosed	
20 June 2025	TBD	FW	Ukraine	Yaroslav Helesh	Szentlőrinc (NB II) (loan)	Returned from loan	
21 June 2025	99	FW	Bulgaria	Tonislav Yordanov	Arda Kardzhali	Undisclosed	
23 June 2025	23	DF	Slovakia	Sinan Medgyes	Zalaegerszeg	Undisclosed	
25 June 2025	14	MF	Ukraine	Bohdan Melnyk	Fehérvár	Undisclosed	
26 June 2025	86	FW	Hungary	Soma Novothny	Ruch Chorzów	Undisclosed	

Loaned from
Date	No.	Pos.	Nat.	Player	Moving from	Until	Ref.
23 July 2025	95	FW	Hungary	Filip Pintér	Vasas (NB II)	30 June 2026	
3 September 2025	7	FW	Hungary	Szilárd Szabó	Ferencváros	30 June 2026	

Out
Date	No.	Pos.	Nat.	Player	Moving to	Fee	Ref.
12 June 2025	37	MF	Hungary	Ádám Czékus	Kecskemét (NB II)	Permanently after loan	
25 June 2025	9	MF	Hungary	Zsolt Pap	TBD	Mutual of agreement	
25 June 2025	19	MF	Croatia	David Puclin	TBD	Contracts expire	
25 July 2025	88	MF	Hungary	Erik Czérna	Szentlőrinc (NB II)	Undisclosed	
30 July 2025	97	FW	Serbia	Miloš Spasić	TBD	Mutual agreement	

=== Winter ===
In
Date	No.	Pos.	Nat.	Player	Moving from	Fee	Ref.
9 December 2025	26	DF	Serbia	Nikola Radmanovac	Qingdao Hainiu (Chinese Super League)	Free agent	

=== Contract extension ===
Date	No.	Pos.	Nat.	Player	Extension to	Ref.
11 June 2025	5	GK	Czech Republic	Martin Chlumecky	N/A	
24 December 2025	70	MF	Hungary	Levente Szőr	30 June 2028	

=== New contract ===
Date	No.	Pos.	Nat.	Player	From	Until	Ref.
15 December 2025		MF	Ukraine Hungary	Nazar Kolyada	Kisvárda Academy	Undisclosed	

=== Managerial changes ===
Outgoing manager	Manner of departure	Date of vacancy	Position in table	Incoming manager	Date of appointment	Ref.
Attila Révész	Appointed sports director	31 May 2025	Pre-season	31 May 2025	(Hungary) Máté Gerliczki	
(Hungary) Máté Gerliczki	Mutual agreement	30 September 2025	7th	10 October 2025	(Hungary) Attila Révész	

^{c} = Caretaker

== Friendlies ==
Win Draw Loss Fixtures

=== Pre-season ===
Kisvárda started the preparation for the 2025/26 season at 20 June 2025.

28 June 2025 Friendly	Békéscsaba (NB II)	0–1	Kisvárda	Békéscsaba
		Report	G. Molnár 1'	Stadium: Kórház utcai Stadion; Referee: Tamás Takács; Assistant referees: P. Vrbovszki, I. László
Note: • KISVÁRDA 1st half: Popovych — Cipetić, Matić, Oláh — K. Nagy, Melnyk, I. Soltész, D. Soltész — G. Molnár (Matanović (substituted on) 23') — Gyurkó, Mešanović • KISVÁRDA 2nd half: M. Kovács — R. Stefan, Lippai, Chlumecký — Bíró, Popoola, Körmendi, Medgyes — Matanović (Osztrovka (substituted on) 69') — Spasić, Novothny • Manager: Gerliczki

Summer training camp in Slovenia, from 30 June until 9 July 2025.

5 July 2025 Friendly	Dynamo (Ukrainian I) (Ukraine)	0–2	Kisvárda	Kidričevo, Slovenia
		Report	Yordanov 24'; Matanović 71' (pen.)	Stadium: Aluminij Sports Park
Note: • KISVÁRDA 1st half: Popovych — Jovičić, Matić, Oláh — K. Nagy, Melnyk, Popoola, D. Soltész — G. Molnár — Novothny, Yordanov • KISVÁRDA from 61 min.: Popovych — Melnyk, Lippai, Chlumecký — Bíró, I. Soltész, Körmendi, Medgyes — Matanović — Mešanović, Spasić • Manager: Gerliczki

6 July 2025 Friendly	Dynamo (Ukrainian I) (Ukraine)	3–0	Kisvárda	Kidričevo, Slovenia
17:00 CEST	Yarmolenko 16'; Gusev (yellow card) 29' (yellow-red card); Supryaha 40'; Zadorozhnyi 43'	Report		Stadium: Aluminij Sports Park, Training center
Note: • KISVÁRDA 1st half: M. Kovács — Cipetić, Lippai, Chlumecký — Bíró, I. Soltész, Körmendi, Medgyes — Matanović — Spasić, Mešanović • KISVÁRDA from 61 min.: M. Kovács — Jovičić, Matić, Oláh — K. Nagy, Melnyk, Popoola, D. Soltész, Gyurkó — Novothny, Yordanov • Manager: Gerliczki

8 July 2025 Friendly	Pančevo (Serbian I) (Serbia)	0–3	Kisvárda	Radomlje, Slovenia
17:30 CEST		Report	Novothny 19'; Mešanović 45'; Medgyes 55'
Note: • KISVÁRDA 1st half: Popovic — Cipetić, Matić, Oláh — K. Nagy, Melnyk, Popoola, D. Soltész — Mešanović — Yordanov, Novothny • KISVÁRDA 2nd half: M. Kovács — Jovičić, Lippai, Chlumecký — Bíró, I. Soltész (Osztrovka), Körmendi, Medgyes — Matanović — Gyurkó, Spasić • Manager: Gerliczki

12 July 2025 Friendly	Michalovce (Slovak I) (Slovakia)	1–4	Kisvárda	Humenné, Slovakia
11:00 CEST	Paulauskas 27'	Report	Novothny 25', 67'; Spasić 79'; Matanović 90'
Note: • KISVÁRDA for 70th min.: Popovic — Matić, Popoola, D. Soltész, Melnyk, Cipetić, Mešanović, Oláh, K. Nagy, Novothny, Yordanov • KISVÁRDA from 70th min.: M. Kovács — Jovičić, Chlumecký, I. Soltész, Matanović, Körmendi, Medgyes, Bíró, Lippai, Spasić, Gyurkó • Manager: Gerliczki

19 July 2025 Friendly	Tatran Prešov (Slovak II) (Slovakia)	1–2	Kisvárda	Prešov, Slovakia
17:00 CEST	Wolsztyński (yellow card) 21'; Regáli 59'	Report	D. Soltész 42'; G. Molnár 82'	Stadium: Tatran Arena; Attendance: 1,850; Referee: Jaroslav Sučka
Note: • KISVÁRDA: Popovic — Matić, Popoola (Körmendi), D. Soltész, Melnyk (I. Soltész), Cipetić (Jovičić), Mešanović (Matanović), Oláh, K. Nagy, Novothny (Gyurkó), Yordanov (G. Molnár) • Manager: Gerliczki

=== Mid-season ===
Winter training camp in Belek, Turkey from 6 January until 13 January 2026.

8 January 2026 Friendly	Dukla Prague (Czech I) (Czech Republic)	1–0	Kisvárda	Belek, Turkey
14:00 (16:00 CET)	Penxa 88'	Report
Note: • Kisvárda: Popovych (M. Kovács) — Jovičić (Medgyes, Vepryk), Oláh (Radmanovac), Chlumecký (Lippai) — K. Nagy (G. Molnár, Szikszai), Melnyk (Osztrovka), Szőr (Cipetić), Popoola (I. Ibrahim), Bíró (Balogun) — Yordanov (Yordanov), Mešanović (c) (Matanović) • Manager: Révész

10 January 2026 Friendly	Rizespor (Turkish I) (Turkey)	2–1	Kisvárda	Belek, Turkey
13:00 (15:00 CET)	Antalyalı 13' (pen.); Zeqiri 70'	Report	Novothny 84' (pen.)
Note: • Kisvárda: Popovych (M. Kovács (substituted on) 63') — Cipetić (K. Nagy (substituted on) 60'), Jovičić (Radmanovac (substituted on) 54'), Oláh (Lippai (substituted on) 74'), Chlumecký (Medgyes (substituted on) 67') — Popoola (N. Balogh (substituted on) 74'), Melnyk (G. Molnár (substituted on) 67') — Matanović (Novothny (substituted on) 53'), Bíró (Szőr (substituted on) 54'), Mešanović (Pintér (substituted on) 54') — Yordanov (Szikszai (substituted on) 67') • Manager: Révész

12 January 2026 Friendly	Radnički (Serbian I) (Serbia)	3–0	Kisvárda	Side, Turkey
13:30 (CET)	Vidakov 59'; Baldé 80'; Bah 88'	Report
Note: • Kisvárda: Popovych (M. Kovács (substituted on) 46') — K. Nagy (Szikszai (substituted on) 63'), Jovičić (Radmanovac (substituted on) 46'), Oláh (Lippai (substituted on) 63'), Chlumecký (Medgyes (substituted on) 63') — Szőr (Popoola (substituted on) 63'), Melnyk (G. Molnár (substituted on) 46') — Matanović (Cipetić (substituted on) 46'), Mešanović (Vepryk (substituted on) 70'), Yordanov (Pintér (substituted on) 63') — Novothny (Bíró (substituted on) 46') • Manager: Révész

17 January 2026 Friendly	Kisvárda	3–1	Michalovce (Slovakia I)	Kisvárda
11:00 (CET)	Yordanov 13', 29'; Mešanović 84'	Report	S. Ramos 61' (pen.)	Stadium: Várkerti Stadion; Attendance: 0 (behind closed doors); Referee: Ferenc Karakó
Note: • Kisvárda: Popovych — K. Nagy, Jovičić, Oláh, Chlumecký (Veprik (substituted on) 84'), Cipetić (Jazsik (substituted on) 84'), Szőr (Abdullahi (substituted on) 84'), Bíró (Koljada (substituted on) 90'), Melnyk, Yordanov, Mešanović • Manager: Révész

17 January 2026 Friendly	Kisvárda	5–1	Michalovce (Slovakia I)	Kisvárda
13:00 (CET)	Novothny 16', 53'; Dzotsenidze 31' (o.g.); Abdullahi 80'; Kozacsuk 84' (pen.)	Report	Teofanopulos 15'	Stadium: Várkerti Stadion; Attendance: 0 (behind closed doors); Referee: Á. Takács
Note: • Kisvárda: Kovács Marcell (Kubarics (substituted on) 82') – Radmanovac, R. Stefan (Kozacsuk (substituted on) 46'), Lippai (Tenkács (substituted on) 78'), Medgyes (Veprik (substituted on) 62'), Matanović (Scsadej (substituted on) 78'), Osztrovka (Jazsik (substituted on) 46'), Novothny (Pryamov (substituted on) 62' (M. Simon (substituted on) 82')), G. Molnár (I. Ibrahim (substituted on) 72'), Szikszai (Koljada (substituted on) 46'), Pintér (Abdullahi (substituted on) 46') • Manager: Révész

== Competitions ==
=== Overall record ===
In italics, we indicate the Last match and the Final position achieved in competition(s) that have not yet been completed.

Competition	First match	Last match	Starting round	Final position	Record							
Competition	First match	Last match	Starting round	Final position	Pld	W	D	L	GF	GA	GD	Win %
Nemzeti Bajnokság I	27 July 2025	2 May 2026	Matchday 1	8th	32	11	7	14	36	48	−12	34.38
Magyar Kupa	13 September 2025	13 September 2025	Round of 64	Round of 64	1	0	0	1	1	3	−2	0.00
Total					33	11	7	15	37	51	−14	33.33

Last updated: 2 May 2026
Source: Soccerway

=== Nemzeti Bajnokság I ===
==== League table ====
Pos	Team	Pld	W	D	L	GF	GA	GD	Pts
6	Puskás Akadémia	33	13	7	13	43	43	0	46
7	Újpest	33	11	7	15	48	57	−9	40
8	Kisvárda	33	11	7	15	36	49	−13	40
9	Nyíregyháza	33	10	10	13	47	57	−10	40
10	MTK	33	9	11	13	55	62	−7	38

Source: Hungarian Football Federation (in Hungarian)
Rules for classification: 1) Points; 2) Matches won; 3) Goal difference; 4) Goals scored; 5) Head-to-head points; 6) Head-to-head goal difference; 7) Fair play ranking; 8) Drawing of lots.

==== Results summary ====
Overall								Home						Away					
Pld	W	D	L	GF	GA	GD	Pts	W	D	L	GF	GA	GD	W	D	L	GF	GA	GD
32	11	7	14	36	48	−12	40	7	4	5	21	20	+1	4	3	9	15	28	−13

Last updated: 2 May 2026.
Source: Soccerway

==== Results by round ====
A = Away; H = Home; W = Win; D = Draw; L = Loss

Round	1	2	3	4	6	7	8	9	10	11	12	13	14	15	5^{1}	16	17	18	19	20	21	22	23	24	25	26	27	28	29	30	31	32	33
Ground	A	H	H	A	A	H	A	H	A	H	H	A	A	H	H	A	H	A	H	A	H	A	A	H	H	A	H	A	H	A	H	A	H
Result	D	L	W	W	W	L	L	W	W	W	D	L	L	W	L	L	D	W	L	D	W	L	D	W	W	L	D	L	D	L	L	L	
Position	8	11	7	6	5	5	7	5	3	2	3	3	6	3	5	6	6	6	6	6	6	7	7	6	4	5	6	6	6	7	7	8	
Points	1	1	4	7	10	10	10	13	16	19	20	20	20	23	23	23	24	27	27	28	31	31	32	35	38	38	39	39	40	40	40	40	
Manager	G	G	G	G	G	G	G	R	R	R	R	R	R	R	R	R	R	R	R	R	R	R	R	R	R	R	R	R	R	R	R	R	

Updated to match(es) played on 2 May 2026. Source:
Notes:
^{1} Round 5 match (Kisvárda–Ferencváros) postponed to 3 December 2025.

Manager: • G Gerliczki • R Révész

==== Matches ====
Win Draw Loss Fixtures Postponed

The draw for the 2025/26 season was held on 16 June 2025.

26 July 2025 1	Nyíregyháza	1–1	Kisvárda	Nyíregyháza
16:00 CEST	Alaxai (yellow card) 76'; Májer (yellow card) 84'; D. Nagy (yellow card) 90+1'; Kovácsréti 90+3' (pen.)	Report	Matić 8' (yellow card) 38'; Melnyk (yellow card) 91'	Stadium: Városi Stadion; Attendance: 6,834; Referee: Balázs Berke; Assistant referees: Péter Garai, Dávid Rózsa
Note: • Kisvárda: Popovych — Cipetić, Matić, Oláh — K. Nagy, Melnyk, Popoola (I. Soltész (substituted on) 84'), D. Soltész — Mešanović (c) (Matanović (substituted on) 77') — Novothny (G. Molnár (substituted on) 68'), Yordanov • Manager: Gerliczki; Player of the match: Bernardo Matić, Kisvárda 8.4 (Source:)

3 August 2025 2	Kisvárda	1–5	Paks	Kisvárda
17:45 CEST	Popoola (yellow card) 16'; Yordanov 24'; Matić (yellow card) 42'	Report	Szendrei 5'; Kinyik (yellow card) 11'; Gyurkits 26'; Hahn 35', 39'; Vécsei (yellow card) 11'; Pető 85'	Stadium: Várkerti Stadion; Attendance: 2,084; Referee: Tamás Bognár; Assistant referees: Ákos Berényi, Péter Ország
Note: • Kisvárda: Popovych — Cipetić (c), Matić, Oláh — K. Nagy (Be. Bíró (substituted on) 46'), Melnyk (Osztrovka (substituted on) 77'), Popoola, D. Soltész (Medgyes (substituted on) 54') — Novothny (Pintér (substituted on) 46'), G. Molnár, Yordanov (Mešanović (substituted on) 54') • Manager: Gerliczki • Player of the match: Kevin Horváth, Paks 9.1 • Best player of Kisvárda: Ridwan Popoola 7.3

10 August 2025 3	Kisvárda	2–1	Puskás Akadémia	Kisvárda
17:45 CEST	Chlumecký 20'; Mešanović (yellow card) 25'; G. Molnár 45+4'	Report	Favorov 26'; Golla (yellow card) 61'; Markgráf (yellow card) 83'	Stadium: Várkerti Stadion; Attendance: 1,980; Referee: Imre Kovács; Assistant referees: Balázs Buzás, József Aradi
Note: • Kisvárda: Popovych — Cipetić, Matić, Chlumecký, D. Soltész (Medgyes (substituted on) 59') — Popoola (Körmendi (substituted on) 81'), Melnyk — Mešanović (c) (Yordanov (substituted on) 75'), G. Molnár (Pintér (substituted on) 75'), Be. Bíró (K. Nagy (substituted on) 59') — Novothny • Manager: Gerliczki • Player of the match: Martin Chlumecký, Kisvárda 8.0 • Best player of Puskás Akadémia: Artem Favorov 7.7

15 August 2025 4	Újpest	0–1	Kisvárda	Budapest
20:15 CEST	Brodić (yellow card) 65'; Ademi (yellow card) 72'; Kr. Horváth (yellow card) 90+6'	Report	Popoola (yellow card) 38'; Chlumecký (yellow card) 66'; Novothny 69'; Gyurkó (yellow card) 90+5'	Stadium: Szusza Ferenc Stadion; Attendance: 6,794; Referee: Márton Rúsz; Assistant referees: Georgiou Theodoros, Viktor Nagy
Note: • Kisvárda: Popovych — Be. Bíró (K. Nagy (substituted on) 83'), Cipetić (Jovičić (substituted on) 77'), Matić, Chlumecký, D. Soltész — Novothny (Gyurkó (substituted on) 83'), Melnyk, Popoola, Mešanović (c) (Matanović (substituted on) 77') — G. Molnár (Pintér (substituted on) 43') • Manager: Gerliczki • Player of the match: Branimir Cipetić, Kisvárda 8.0 • Best player of Újpest: André Duarte 7.6

30 August 2025 6	Zalaegerszeg	1–2	Kisvárda	Zalaegerszeg
14:45 CEST	Csonka (yellow card) 19'; Szendrei (yellow card) 26'; Klausz 78'; Dénes (yellow card) 82'; Cs. Papp (yellow card) 83'	Report	Cipetić 27' (pen.) (yellow card) 83'; K. Nagy 45+1'; Körmendi (yellow card) 76'; Matić (yellow card) 88'	Stadium: ZTE Arena; Attendance: 2,209; Referee: Marcell Derdák; Assistant referees: Zoltán Horváth, József Aradi
Note: • Kisvárda: Popovych — Cipetić (Lippai (substituted on) 84'), Matić, Chlumecký, D. Soltész (Medgyes (substituted on) 73') — Melnyk, Popoola — Be. Bíró (Körmendi (substituted on) 66'), K. Nagy (Jovičić (substituted on) 73'), Mešanović (c) (Pintér (substituted on) 73') — Novothny • Manager: Gerliczki • Player of the match: Norbert Szendrei, Zalaegerszeg 7.9 • Best player of Kisvárda: Branimir Cipetić 7.8

21 September 2025 7	Kisvárda	0–1	Debrecen	Kisvárda
17:45 CEST	Mešanović (yellow card) 86'	Report	Bárány 81'	Stadium: Várkerti Stadion; Attendance: 2,710; Referee: Tamás Bognár; Assistant referees: Balázs Buzás, Péter Kóbor
Note: • Kisvárda: Popovych — Cipetić, Matić, Chlumecký, D. Soltész (Medgyes (substituted on) 82') — Sz. Szabó (G. Molnár (substituted on) 76'), Popoola — K. Nagy (Adayilo (substituted on) 82'), Be. Bíró (Szőr (substituted on) 70'), Mešanović (c) — Novothny (Pintér (substituted on) 46') • Manager: Gerliczki • Player of the match: Adrián Guerrero, Debrecen 7.9 • Best player of Kisvárda: Martin Chlumecký 7.5

28 September 2025 8	MTK	4–0	Kisvárda	Budapest
14:15 CEST	Matić 15' (o.g.); Kata (yellow card) 23'; Á. Molnár 31'; Kerezsi 58'; Bognár (yellow card) 70'; Polievka 71'; Varju (yellow card) 76'	Report	Lippai (yellow card) 49'; Popoola (yellow card) 56'; G. Molnár (yellow card) 76'	Stadium: Hidegkuti Nándor Stadion; Attendance: 2,571; Referee: Péter Zierkelbalch; Assistant referees: István Szécsényi, Dániel Szalai
Note: • Kisvárda: Popovych — Cipetić, Matić, Chlumecký — Popoola — Sz. Szabó (Lippai (substituted on) 46'), K. Nagy (G. Molnár (substituted on) 46'), Be. Bíró (Körmendi (substituted on) 57'), D. Soltész — Yordanov (Matanović (substituted on) 72'), Mešanović (c) (Novothny (substituted on) 64') • Manager: Gerliczki • Player of the match: Ádin Molnár, MTK 8.4 • Best player of Kisvárda: Ridwan Popoola 7.4

5 October 2025 9	Kisvárda	1–0	Diósgyőr	Kisvárda
19:00 CEST	Mešanović (yellow card) 19' (goal) 55'; Pintér (yellow card) 90+4'	Report		Stadium: Várkerti Stadion; Attendance: 2,240; Referee: Bence Hanyecz; Assistant referees: Péter Ország, Viktor Nagy
Note: • Kisvárda: Popovych — Cipetić, Matić, Chlumecký, D. Soltész — Popoola, I. Soltész (Sz. Szabó (substituted on) 14'), Be. Bíró, Matanović (G. Molnár (substituted on) 70'), Mešanović (c) (Yordanov (substituted on) 80') — Novothny (Pintér (substituted on) 70') • Manager: Révész • Player of the match: Karlo Sentić, Diósgyőr 7.8 • Best player of Kisvárda: Branimir Cipetić 7.4

19 October 2025 10	Kazincbarcika	0–1	Kisvárda	Mezőkövesd
13:15 CEST	Sós (yellow card) 32'; Šlogar (yellow card) 44'	Report	Mešanović 18'; Be. Bíró (yellow card) 66'; D. Soltész (yellow card) 71'; Matanović (yellow card) 90+2'	Stadium: Városi Stadion; Attendance: 632; Referee: Balázs Berke; Assistant referees: Vencel Tóth II, István Szécsényi
Note: • Kisvárda: Popovych — Cipetić, Matić, Chlumecký, D. Soltész (Medgyes (substituted on) 75') — Melnyk (Körmendi (substituted on) 89'), Popoola — Be. Bíró, K. Nagy (Lippai (substituted on) 75'), Mešanović (c) (Matanović (substituted on) 89') — Novothny (Sz. Szabó (substituted on) 82') • Manager: Révész • Player of the match: Dominik Soltész, Kisvárda 8.7 • Best player of Kazincbarcika: Sodiq Rasheed 7.3

26 October 2025 11	Kisvárda	3–2	Győr	Kisvárda
12:45 CET	D. Soltész (yellow card) 41'; Novothny 45+2'; Chlumecký (yellow card) 66'; Be. Bíró 73'; G. Molnár 89'	Report	Benbouali 14'; Bumba 19'; Pyshchur (yellow card) 84'	Stadium: Várkerti Stadion; Attendance: 2,521; Referee: Gergő Bogár; Assistant referees: Gergely Becséri, Dávid Rózsa
Note: • Kisvárda: Popovych — Cipetić, Jovičić, Chlumecký — K. Nagy (Sz. Szabó (substituted on) 46'), Melnyk (G. Molnár (substituted on) 75'), Popoola, D. Soltész (Medgyes (substituted on) 67') — Be. Bíró — Novothny (Yordanov (substituted on) 75'), Mešanović (c) (Matanović (substituted on) 67') • Manager: Révész • Player of the match: Soma Novothny, Kisvárda 7.8 • Best player of Győri ETO: Nadhir Benbouali 7.5

31 October 2025 12	Kisvárda	0–0	Nyíregyháza	Kisvárda
20:00 CET	Melnyk (yellow card) 20'; Jovičić (yellow card) 58'	Report	Temesvári (red card) 15'; Edomwonyi (yellow card) 15'; Kovácsréti (yellow card) 35'; L. Katona (yellow card) 89'	Stadium: Várkerti Stadion; Attendance: 3,005; Referee: Péter Zierkelbach; Assistant referees: Vencel Tóth II, Balázs Buzás
Note: • Kisvárda: Popovych — Sz. Szabó (G. Molnár (substituted on) 46'), Cipetić, Jovičić, Chlumecký, Medgyes (D. Soltész (substituted on) 46') — Be. Bíró, Popoola (Szőr (substituted on) 64'), Melnyk (Matanović (substituted on) 74'), Mešanović (c) (Yordanov (substituted on) 64') — Novothny • Manager: Révész • Player of the match: Dániel Kovács, Nyíregyháza 8.1 • Best player of Kisvárda: Martin Chlumecký 8.0

8 November 2025 13	Paks	5–3	Kisvárda	Paks
19:15 CET	Hahn 24', 57'; B. Balogh (yellow card) 45'; J. Szabó 52'; Böde 59'; Galambos 83'; Gyurkits (yellow card) 90+2'	Report	Popoola 37' (yellow card) 40' (yellow-red card) 90+2'; Be. Bíró 62', 78'; Chlumecký (yellow card) 72'; Cipetić (yellow card) 77'	Stadium: Fehérvári úti Stadion; Attendance: 2,410; Referee: József Erdős; Assistant referees: Vencel Tóth II, József Aradi
Note: • Kisvárda: Popovych — Cipetić, Jovičić, Chlumecký, D. Soltész (Medgyes (substituted on) 62') — Melnyk (Matanović (substituted on) 62'), Popoola — Sz. Szabó (K. Nagy (substituted on) 71'), Mešanović (c) (G. Molnár (substituted on) 84'), Be. Bíró — Novothny (Yordanov (substituted on) 84') • Manager: Révész • Player of the match: Bence Bíró, Kisvárda 8.6 • Best player of Paks: János Hahn 7.8

22 November 2025 14	Puskás Akadémia	2–0	Kisvárda	Felcsút
14:30 CET	Lukács 40', 78'	Report	Matanović (yellow card) 63'	Stadium: Pancho Aréna; Attendance: 783; Referee: Marcell Derdák; Assistant referees: Balázs Huszár, Zoltán Horváth
Note: • Kisvárda: Popovych — Cipetić, Jovičić, Chlumecký — K. Nagy (Szikszai (substituted on) 81'), Be. Bíró, Melnyk (G. Molnár (substituted on) 81'), Mešanović (c) (Yordanov (substituted on) 60'), Medgyes (Körmendi (substituted on) 81') — Novothny (Pintér (substituted on) 81'), Matanović • Manager: Révész • Player of the match: Dániel Lukács, Puskás Akadémia 8.5 • Best player of Kisvárda: Martin Chlumecký 7.4

30 November 2025 15	Kisvárda	3–0	Újpest	Kisvárda
13:45 CET	K. Nagy 57' (yellow card) 61'; Be. Bíró 63'; Cipetić 80' (yellow card) 82'; Pintér (yellow card) 87'	Report	Kobouri (yellow card) 82'	Stadium: Várkerti Stadion; Attendance: 2,120; Referee: Tamás Bognár; Assistant referees: Balázs Szert, Viktor Nagy
Note: • Kisvárda: Popovych — Cipetić, Jovičić, Chlumecký — K. Nagy (Lippai (substituted on) 74'), Melnyk, Popoola, Medgyes (D. Soltész (substituted on) 59') — Be. Bíró (Szikszai (substituted on) 84') — G. Molnár (Pintér (substituted on) 74'), Mešanović (c) (Novothny (substituted on) 74') • Manager: Révész • Player of the match: Branimir Cipetić, Kisvárda 8.4 • Best player of Újpest: Giorgi Beridze 7.6

4 December 2025 5	Kisvárda	0–1	Ferencváros	Kisvárda
18:00 CET	Sz. Szabó (yellow card) 72'; Jovičić (yellow card) 80'	Report	Ötvös 74' (pen.); Gróf (yellow card) 85'	Stadium: Várkerti Stadion; Attendance: 3,150; Referee: Balázs Berke; Assistant referees: Gergely Becséri, Dávid Rózsa
Note: • Kisvárda: Popovych — Cipetić, Jovičić, Chlumecký, Medgyes (Körmendi (substituted on) 68'), Popoola, Melnyk — K. Nagy (Sz. Szabó (substituted on) 68'), Be. Bíró (G. Molnár (substituted on) 83'), Mešanović (c) (Novothny (substituted on) 46') — Pintér (Matanović (substituted on) 68') • Manager: Révész • Player of the match: Barnabás Nagy, Ferencváros 7.5 • Best player of Kisvárda: Illya Popovych 7.1

7 December 2025 16	Ferencváros	3–0	Kisvárda	Budapest
17:00 CET	B. Nagy 11'; Ötvös 21' (pen.); Yusuf 26'	Report	Novothny (yellow card) 13'; K. Nagy (yellow card) 75'; Cipetić (yellow card) 90'	Stadium: Groupama Aréna; Attendance: 7,057; Referee: Gergő Bogár; Assistant referees: Norbert Bornemissza, József Aradi
Note: • Kisvárda: Popovych — Cipetić, Jovičić (c) (Lippai (substituted on) 46'), Chlumecký, Medgyes (Körmendi (substituted on) 46') — Melnyk, Popoola (Szőr (substituted on) 61') — K. Nagy, Be. Bíró, Matanović (Pintér (substituted on) 69') — Novothny (Yordanov (substituted on) 61') • Manager: Révész • Player of the match: Barnabás Nagy, Ferencváros 8.6 • Best player of Kisvárda: Marko Matanović 7.0

14 December 2025 17	Kisvárda	3–3	Zalaegerszeg	Kisvárda
18:45 CET	Yordanov 4'; Chlumecký 8'; G. Molnár (yellow card) 50'; Cipetić (yellow card) 73'; Szőr 76'; Melnyk (yellow card) 85'; Jovičić (yellow card) 90'	Report	N. Szendrei (yellow card) 10' (yellow-red card) 90+3'; Skribek 18'; Maxsuell 33'; Amato 60'; Várkonyi (yellow card) 71'; Calderón (yellow card) 85' (yellow-red card) 90+4'	Stadium: Várkerti Stadion; Attendance: 1,570; Referee: Marcell Derdák; Assistant referees: Ákos Berényi, Dávid Rózsa
Note: • Kisvárda: Popovych — Cipetić, Jovičić, Chlumecký, Medgyes (Szőr (substituted on) 68') — K. Nagy (Körmendi (substituted on) 46'), Melnyk, G. Molnár, Be. Bíró (Lippai (substituted on) 76'), Mešanović (c) — Yordanov (Matanović (substituted on) 68') • Manager: Révész • Player of the match: Tonislav Yordanov, Kisvárda 7.8 • Best player of Zalaegerszeg: Fabricio Amato 7.8

21 December 2025 18	Debrecen	0–1	Kisvárda	Debrecen
17:30 CET	Lang (yellow card) 74'; Komáromi (yellow card) 86'; D. Kocsis (red card) 87' (On the bench); Mejias (yellow card) 90+5'	Report	Yordanov 55'; K. Nagy (yellow card) 79'; Chlumecký (yellow card) 90+5'	Stadium: Nagyerdei Stadion; Attendance: 5,133; Referee: Márton Rúsz; Assistant referees: Norbert Bornemissza, Dániel Szalai
Note: • Kisvárda: Popovych — K. Nagy (Lippai (substituted on) 90'), Jovičić, Oláh, Chlumecký — Matanović (Novothny (substituted on) 70'), Melnyk, Szőr (Körmendi (substituted on) 78'), Be. Bíró — Yordanov (G. Molnár (substituted on) 90'), Mešanović (c) (Pintér (substituted on) 78') • Manager: Révész • Player of the match: Tonislav Yordanov, Kisvárda 7.7 • Best player of Debrecen: Bence Batik 7.5

24 January 2026 19	Kisvárda	2–3	MTK	Kisvárda
15:00 CET	Á. Molnár 10', 74' (pen.); Popoola (yellow card) 72'; Lippai 82' (o.g.)	Report	Be. Bíró 28'; Szőr 79'	Stadium: Várkerti Stadion; Attendance: 1,250; Referee: Márton Rúsz; Assistant referees: Norbert Bornemissza, József Aradi
Note: • Kisvárda: Popovych — K. Nagy (Lippai (substituted on) 75'), Jovičić, Oláh, Chlumecký — Melnyk (Popoola (substituted on) 58'), Szőr — Cipetić (Matanović (substituted on) 58'), Mešanović (c) (Novothny (substituted on) 46'), Be. Bíró — Yordanov (Pintér (substituted on) 75') • Manager: Révész • Player of the match: Ádin Molnár, MTK 8.1 • Best player of Kisvárda: Levente Szőr 7.9

1 February 2026 20	Diósgyőr	1–1	Kisvárda	Miskolc
12:45 CET	Bényei 39'	Report	Radmanovac (yellow card) 49'; Yordanov 69' (pen.); Jovičić (yellow card) 78'	Stadium: Diósgyőri Stadion; Attendance: 1,176; Referee: Balázs Berke; Assistant referees: Dániel Szalai, Dávid Rózsa
Note: • Kisvárda: Popovych — Jovičić (c) (Cipetić (substituted on) 87'), Radmanovac, Oláh, Chlumecký (Medgyes (substituted on) 90+3') — Szőr (G. Molnár (substituted on) 61'), Popoola — Matanović (Novothny (substituted on) 87'), Mbock (Yordanov (substituted on) 61'), Melnyk — Be. Bíró • Manager: Révész • Player of the match: Bálint Oláh, Kisvárda 8.0 • Best player of Diósgyőr: Márk Tamás 7.4

6 February 2026 21	Kisvárda	1–0	Kazincbarcika	Kisvárda
17:45 CET	Chlumecký (yellow card) 82'; Cipetić 89' (pen.) (yellow card) 89'	Report	Meskhi (yellow card) 42'; Klausz (yellow card) 59'; Baranyai (yellow card) 86'	Stadium: Várkerti Stadion; Attendance: 1,283; Referee: Gergő Bogár; Assistant referees: István Szécsényi, Gergely Becséri
Note: • Kisvárda: Popovych — Jovičić (c) (Matanović (substituted on) 46'), Radmanovac, Oláh, Chlumecký — Melnyk, Mbock (Szőr (substituted on) 64'), Popoola (Cipetić (substituted on) 64') — Be. Bíró, Novothny (G. Molnár (substituted on) 55'), Yordanov (Pintér (substituted on) 80') • Manager: Révész • Player of the match: Nikola Radmanovac, Kisvárda 8.2 • Best player of Kazincbarcika: Dániel Gyollai 7.1

15 February 2026 22	Győr	1–0	Kisvárda	Győr
17:45 CET	Schön 23'; Štefulj (yellow card) 48'	Report	Oláh (yellow card) 49'; Cipetić (yellow card) 65'; Szőr (yellow card) 72'	Stadium: ETO Park; Attendance: 4,087; Referee: Tamás Bognár; Assistant referees: Péter Kóbor, Balázs Huszár
Note: • Kisvárda: Popovych — Jovičić (c) (G. Molnár (substituted on) 85'), Radmanovac, Oláh, Medgyes (K. Nagy (substituted on) 68') — Popoola, Mbock (Szőr (substituted on) 68') — Cipetić (Matanović (substituted on) 68'), Melnyk, Be. Bíró — Yordanov (Novothny (substituted on) 85') • Manager: Révész • Player of the match: Szabolcs Schön, Győri ETO 9.4 • Best player of Kisvárda: Sinan Medgyes 7.6

21 February 2026 23	Nyíregyháza	2–2	Kisvárda	Nyíregyháza
14:00 CET	M. Kovács 21'; Drešković 59'	Report	Popoola (yellow card) 7'; Be. Bíró 28'; Jovičić 33'; Melnyk (yellow card) 88'	Stadium: Városi Stadion; Attendance: 4,355; Referee: Bence Hanyecz; Assistant referees: Gergely Becséri, Zoltán Horváth
Note: • Kisvárda: Popovych — Jovičić (c) (Cipetić (substituted on) 78'), Radmanovac, Oláh, Chlumecký — Popoola (Szőr (substituted on) 26'), Mbock (G. Molnár (substituted on) 78') — Matanović (D. Soltész (substituted on) 78'), Melnyk, Be. Bíró — Pintér (Novothny (substituted on) 61') • Manager: Révész • Player of the match: Aleksandar Jovičić, Nyíregyháza 8.3 • Best player of Kisvárda: Nemanja Antonov 8.0

28 February 2026 24	Kisvárda	2–1	Paks	Kisvárda
14:30 CET	Oláh (yellow card) 19'; Mbock 50'; Cipetić 65' (pen.)	Report	Bévárdi (yellow card) 27'; Hahn 45+1' (pen.); Á. Szendrei (yellow card) 53'; Alaxai (yellow card) 71'; M. Szekszárdi (yellow card) 90+3'	Stadium: Várkerti Stadion; Attendance: 1,620; Referee: Márió Zimmermann; Assistant referees: Balázs Szalai, Dávid Rózsa
Note: • Kisvárda: Popovych — Jovičić (c), Radmanovac, Oláh, Chlumecký — I. Soltész (Szőr (substituted on) 46'), Mbock (D. Soltész (substituted on) 76') — Cipetić (Yordanov (substituted on) 87'), Melnyk, Matanović (Lippai (substituted on) 90+1') — Pintér (Novothny (substituted on) 46') • Manager: Révész • Player of the match: Hianga'a Mbock, Kisvárda 7.9 • Best player of Paks: Ádám Kovácsik 7.1

6 March 2026 25	Kisvárda	1–0	Puskás Akadémia	Kisvárda
20:00 CET	Matanović (yellow card) 10'; Zs. Nagy 16' (o.g.); Mbock (yellow card) 28'; Novothny (yellow card) 54'; Popoola (yellow card) 66'; Be. Bíró (yellow card) 79'; Popovych (yellow card) 86'	Report	Kern (yellow card) 21'	Stadium: Várkerti Stadion; Attendance: 1,783; Referee: Gergő Bogár; Assistant referees: Vencel Tóth II, Gergő Vígh-Tarsonyi
Note: • Kisvárda: Popovych — Jovičić (c) (D. Soltész (substituted on) 74'), Radmanovac, Oláh, Chlumecký — Mbock (Szőr (substituted on) 74') — Matanović, Melnyk, Be. Bíró (G. Molnár (substituted on) 83'), Cipetić (Popoola (substituted on) 46') — Pintér (Novothny (substituted on) 60') • Manager: Révész • Player of the match: Nikola Radmanovac, Kisvárda 7.6 • Best player of Puskás Akadémia: Georgy Arutyunyan 7.2

14 March 2026 26	Újpest	2–1	Kisvárda	Budapest
14:30 CET	Bese 5'; Ljujić 59' (pen.)	Report	Be. Bíró 26'; K. Nagy (yellow card) 63'; Szőr (yellow card) 81'	Stadium: Szusza Ferenc Stadion; Attendance: 5,057; Referee: Mihály Káprály; Assistant referees: István Albert, Zoltán Horváth
Note: • Kisvárda: Popovych — K. Nagy (Novothny (substituted on) 70'), Radmanovac (c), Oláh, Chlumecký (D. Soltész (substituted on) 60') — Mbock, Popoola (Szőr (substituted on) 60') — Matanović, Melnyk, Be. Bíró (Sz. Szabó (substituted on) 75') — Yordanov (G. Molnár (substituted on) 70') • Manager: Révész • Player of the match: Barnabás Bese, Újpest 7.9 • Best player of Kisvárda: Nikola Radmanovac 7.0

22 March 2026 27	Kisvárda	1–1	Ferencváros	Kisvárda
19:15 CET	Cipetić (yellow card) 27'; Melnyk 63'; Mbock (yellow card) 70'; Popovych (yellow card) 81'	Report	Kovačević 15'; Osváth (yellow card) 24'; Madarász (yellow card) 34'; Yusuf (yellow card) 52'	Stadium: Várkerti Stadion; Attendance: 3,150; Referee: Péter Antal; Assistant referees: István Szécsényi, Ákos Berényi
Note:

4 April 2026 28	Zalaegerszeg	2–0	Kisvárda	Zalaegerszeg
14:30 CEST	João Victor 48'; Harangi 61'	Report		Stadium: ZTE Arena; Attendance: 3,328; Referee: Márton Rúsz; Assistant referees: Zoltán Horváth, Dániel Szalai
Note: • Kisvárda: Popovych — K. Nagy (Cipetić (substituted on) 66'), Radmanovac, Chlumecký, Oláh — Mbock, Popoola (Pintér (substituted on) 66' (substituted off) 73' (G. Molnár (substituted on) 73')) — Matanović, Melnyk, Be. Bíró (Novothny (substituted on) 84') — Mešanović (c) (Sz. Szabó (substituted on) 66') • Manager: Révész • Player of the match: Akpe Victory, Zalaegerszeg 7.7 • Best player of Kisvárda: Hianga'a Mbock 7.0

13 April 2026 29	Kisvárda	0–0	Debrecen	Kisvárda
20:00 CEST	Matanović (yellow card) 9'; Be. Bíró (yellow card) 69'	Report	B. Vajda (yellow card) 88'	Stadium: Várkerti Stadion; Attendance: 1,951; Referee: Balázs Berke; Assistant referees: István Albert, Tibor Csatári
Note: • Kisvárda: Popovych — Cipetić (c) (G. Molnár (substituted on) 77'), Radmanovac, Oláh, Chlumecký — Popoola, Mbock (Szőr (substituted on) 46') — Matanović (Sz. Szabó (substituted on) 62'), Melnyk, Szikszai (Novothny (substituted on) 62') — Be. Bíró (Mešanović (substituted on) 73') • Manager: Révész • Player of the match: Dominik Kocsis, Debrecen 7.7 • Best player of Kisvárda: Ridwan Popoola 7.6

18 April 2026 30	MTK	2–1	Kisvárda	Budapest
17:00 CEST	Átrok 24'; K. Németh 90'	Report	Jovičić 90+2'	Stadium: Hidegkuti Nándor Stadion; Attendance: 2,497; Referee: Péter Zierkelbach; Assistant referees: Balázs Szert, István Szécsényi
Note: • Kisvárda: Popovych — Cipetić (c), Radmanovac, Oláh, Chlumecký (Jovičić (substituted on) 69') — Matanović, Melnyk, Popoola (Szőr (substituted on) 63'), Szikszai (Balogun (substituted on) 69') — Yordanov (Novothny (substituted on) 46'), Be. Bíró (G. Molnár (substituted on) 76') • Manager: Révész • Player of the match: Vilius Armalas, MTK 8.0 • Best player of Kisvárda: Aleksandar Jovičić 7.8

25 April 2026 31	Kisvárda	1–2	Diósgyőr	Kisvárda
14:30 CEST	Matanović 22'; Jovičić (yellow card) 37'; G. Molnár (yellow card) 90' (yellow-red card) 90'	Report	A. Keita (yellow card) 15'; Pető 38' (pen.); Colley 54'; Esiti (yellow card) 73'	Stadium: Várkerti Stadion; Attendance: 1,486; Referee: Bence Hanyecz; Assistant referees: István Albert, Balázs Buzás
Note: • Kisvárda: Popovych — Cipetić (Be. Bíró (substituted on) 66'), Radmanovac, Jovičić (c) (Chlumecký (substituted on) 66'), Oláh — Matanović, Szőr (Mbock (substituted on) 73'), Melnyk, Popoola, I. Soltész (G. Molnár (substituted on) 46') — Novothny (Balogun (substituted on) 66') • Manager: Révész • Player of the match: Marko Matanović, Kisvárda 8.2 • Best player of Diósgyőr: Lamin Colley 7.8

2 May 2026 32	Kazincbarcika	2–1	Kisvárda	Mezőkövesd
16:00 CEST	Meskhi (yellow card) 10'; Schuszter (yellow card) 17'; Szőke 21'; Zs. Nagy 45+2'; Kártik (yellow card) 53'; Deutsch (yellow card) 65'	Report	Szőr (yellow card) 6'; Novothny 64'; D. Soltész (yellow card) 86'	Stadium: Városi Stadion; Attendance: 503; Referee: Imre Kovács; Assistant referees: István Széchenyi, Tibor Csatári
Note: • Kisvárda: Popovych — K. Nagy, Oláh, Radmanovac, D. Soltész — Mbock (Yordanov (substituted on) 46'), Szőr (I. Soltész (substituted on) 76') — Matanović (Sz. Szabó (substituted on) 71'), Melnyk, Szikszai (Be. Bíró (substituted on) 46') — Mešanović (c) (Novothny (substituted on) 46') • Manager: Révész • Player of the match: Gergő Szőke, Kazincbarcika 7.6 • Best player of Kisvárda: Soma Novothny 7.3

16 May 2026 33	Kisvárda	v	Győr	Kisvárda
17:15 CEST		Report		Stadium: Várkerti Stadion; Referee: Bence Csonka dr. Assistant referees: Balázs Szert, Dániel Szalai

=== Magyar Kupa ===
==== Round of 64 ====
13 September 2025 R64	Ajka (NB II)	3–1	Kisvárda	Ajka
19:00 CEST	Doncsecz 48'; Tar 54'; Csizmadia (yellow card) 68'; Mohos (yellow card) 71'; Sejben 80'; Horváth (yellow card) 87'; Lakatos (yellow card) 90'	Report	Medgyes (yellow card) 59'; Chlumecký (yellow card) 63'; Mešanović 69'	Stadium: Városi Stadion; Attendance: 1,000; Referee: Gergő Bogár; Assistant referees: Vencel Tóth II, Dániel Szabó
Note: • Kisvárda: M. Kovács — Cipetić, Jovičić, Oláh (Chlumecký (substituted on) 40') — Sz. Szabó, I. Soltész (Szőr (substituted on) 56'), Körmendi, Medgyes (D. Soltész (substituted on) 68') — Matanović (Pintér (substituted on) 68') — Mešanović (c), Yordanov (Novothny (substituted on) 56') • Manager: Gerliczki
