= List of Kisvárda FC seasons =

Kisvárda Football Club is a professional association football club based in Kisvárda.

== Key ==
Nemzeti Bajnokság I

- Pld = Matches played
- W = Matches won
- D = Matches drawn
- L = Matches lost
- GF = Goals for
- GA = Goals against
- Pts = Points
- Pos = Final position

Hungarian football league system

- NBI = Nemzeti Bajnokság I
- NBII = Nemzeti Bajnokság II
- NBIII = Nemzeti Bajnokság III
- MBI = Megyei Bajnokság I

Magyar Kupa

- F = Final
- SF = Semi-finals
- QF = Quarter-finals
- R16 = Round of 16
- R32 = Round of 32
- R64 = Round of 64
- R128 = Round of 128

UEFA

- F = Final
- SF = Semi-finals
- QF = Quarter-finals
- Group = Group stage
- PO = Play-offs
- QR3 = Third qualifying round
- QR2 = Second qualifying round
- QR1 = First qualifying round
- PR = Preliminary round

Winners	Runners-up	Third	Promoted	Relegated

== Seasons ==
As of 28 September 2025.

Season	League										Cup	UEFA		Manager	Ref.
Season	Tier	Div.	MP	W	D	L	GF	GA	Pts.	Pos.	Cup	Competition	Result	Manager	Ref.
2006-07	4	MBI ↑	28	20	3	4	92	25	63	2nd		Did not qualify		Révész	
2007-08	3	NBIII	30	18	6	6	65	30	60	2nd		Did not qualify		Kocsis	
2008-09	3	NBIII ↓	30	14	8	8	49	36	28	14th		Did not qualify		Kocsis	
2009–10	4	MBI	34	12	8	14	37	43	44	10th		Did not qualify		Seres	
2010–11	4	MBI ↑	34	25	5	4	89	23	80	1st		Did not qualify		Rozsnyai	
2011–12	3	NBIII	30	24	3	3	78	16	75	1st		Did not qualify		Révész	
2012–13	3	NBIII ↑	26	19	6	1	77	15	63	1st		Did not qualify		Révész	
2013–14	2	NBII ↓	30	7	10	13	39	44	31	14th		Did not qualify		Révész	
2014–15	3	NBIII ↑	28	24	2	2	92	21	74	1st		Did not qualify		Révész	
2015–16	2	NBII	30	15	7	8	63	36	52	4th		Did not qualify		Soós	
2016–17	2	NBII	38	20	9	9	55	30	69	3rd		Did not qualify		Révész	
2017–18	2	NBII ↑	38	22	9	7	70	40	75	2nd	R32	Did not qualify		(Hungary) Kondás	
2018–19	1	NBI	33	10	8	15	36	48	38	9th	R16	Did not qualify		(Hungary) Kondás, (Hungary) Dajka	
2019–20	1	NBI	33	12	6	15	42	43	42	8th	TBD	Did not qualify		(Hungary) (Romania) Miriuță, (Hungary) Bódog	
2020–21	1	NBI	33	12	10	11	30	36	46	5th	SF	Did not qualify		(Hungary) Supka	
2021–22	1	NBI	33	16	11	6	50	34	59	2nd	R16	Did not qualify		(Portugal) Janeiro, (Hungary) Erős	
2022–23	1	NBI	33	10	13	10	43	49	43	6th	QF	Conference League	3QR	(Hungary) Erős, (Serbia) Kruščić	
2023–24	1	NBI ↓	33	9	4	20	40	55	31	11th	SF			(Serbia) Kruščić	
2024–25	2	NBII													
2025–26	1	NB I	7	3	1	3	7	13	10	7th	R64	Did not qualify		(Hungary) Gerliczki,	

Notes

- In the 2008-09 season, 22 points were deducted from Kisvárda due to violating the rules of players.
