= Lippai =

Lippai is a surname. Notable people with the surname include:

- Ákos Lippai (born 1979), Hungarian footballer
- Tibor Lippai (born 1997), Hungarian footballer
