= Branimir Cipetić =

Bosnian footballer (born 1995)

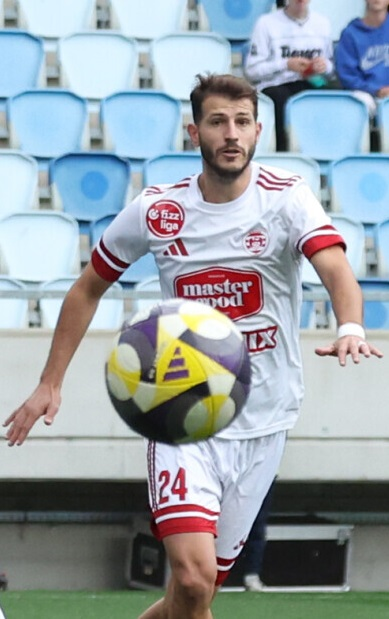
- Cipetić playing for Kisvárda in 2025

Personal information
- Date of birth: 24 May 1995 (age 31)
- Place of birth: Split, Croatia
- Height: 1.84 m (6 ft 0 in)
- Position: Right-back

Team information
- Current team: Borac Banja Luka
- Number: 4

Youth career
- 2006–2007: GOŠK Gabela
- 2007–2013: Hajduk Split
- 2013–2014: Alicante

Senior career*
Years	Team	Apps	(Gls)
2014–2016	Torrevieja	24	(5)
2016–2017	Elche B	35	(2)
2017–2019	Vitoria	62	(6)
2019–2021	Široki Brijeg	33	(0)
2021–2023	Lokomotiva	83	(0)
2023–2026	Kisvárda	88	(15)
2026–	Borac Banja Luka	3	(0)

International career
2020–2021	Bosnia and Herzegovina	7	(0)
- * Club domestic league appearances and goals as of 20 September 2026

Branimir Cipetić (Croatian pronunciation: [brǎnimir tsǐpetitɕ]; born 24 May 1995) is a professional footballer who plays as a right-back for Bosnian Premier League club Borac Banja Luka. Born in Croatia, he played for the Bosnia and Herzegovina national team.

== Club career ==
A youth product of hometown club Hajduk Split, Cipetić moved to Spain in 2013 and started his career as an amateur footballer there, before going professional joining Vitoria in 2017. In 2019, he signed with Bosnian Premier League club Široki Brijeg. He made his official debut for Široki Brijeg in a 2–2 draw against Sloboda Tuzla on 27 July 2019. Cipetić scored his first goal for Široki Brijeg in a cup game against GOŠK Gabela on 30 September 2020.

== International career ==
Cipetić was born in Split, Croatia to Bosnian Croat parents, and raised in Kaštela. His father is from Kostajnica and his mother is from Prozor-Rama. On 17 August 2020, he was called up to represent the Bosnia and Herzegovina national team.

Cipetić made his international debut for Bosnia and Herzegovina in a 2020–21 UEFA Nations League A match against Italy.

== Career statistics ==
=== Club ===
As of match played 20 September 2026

Appearances and goals by club, season and competition
Club	Season	League			National cup (Note: Includes Bosnian Cup, Croatian Cup, Hungarian Cup)		Total	
Club	Season	Division	Apps	Goals	Apps	Goals	Apps	Goals
Vitoria	2017–18	Segunda División B	32	3	—		32	3
Vitoria	2018–19	Segunda División B	30	3	—		30	3
Vitoria	Total		62	6	—		62	6
Široki Brijeg	2019–20	Bosnian Premier League	18	0	2	0	20	0
Široki Brijeg	2020–21	Bosnian Premier League	15	0	1	1	16	1
Široki Brijeg	Total		33	0	3	1	36	1
Lokomotiva	2020–21	Croatian First League	20	0	—		20	0
Lokomotiva	2021–22	Croatian First League	30	0	3	0	33	0
Lokomotiva	2022–23	Croatian First League	33	0	3	0	36	0
Lokomotiva	Total		83	0	6	0	89	0
Kisvárda	2023–24	Nemzeti Bajnokság I	30	5	4	0	34	5
Kisvárda	2024–25	Nemzeti Bajnokság II	29	6	4	0	33	6
Kisvárda	2025–26	Nemzeti Bajnokság I	29	4	1	0	30	4
Kisvárda	Total		88	15	9	0	97	15
Borac Banja Luka	2026–27	Bosnian Premier League	3	0	0	0	3	0
Career total			269	21	18	1	287	22

=== International ===
Appearances and goals by national team and year
National team	Year	Apps	Goals
Bosnia and Herzegovina
Bosnia and Herzegovina	2020	3	0
Bosnia and Herzegovina	2021	4	0
Total		7	0

== Honours ==
Kisvárda

- Nemzeti Bajnokság II: 2024–25
