= Tonislav Yordanov =

Bulgarian footballer (born 1998)

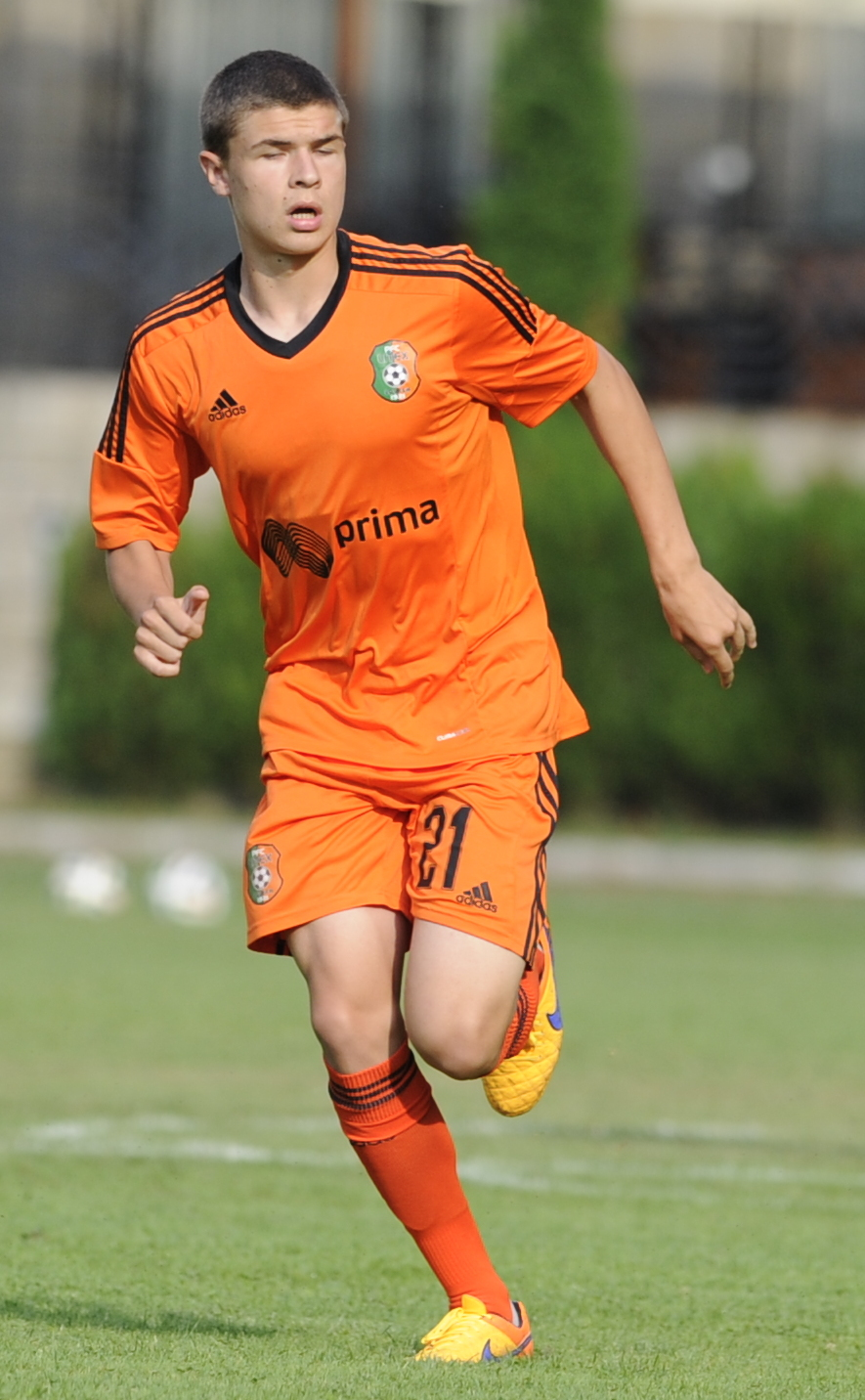

Personal information
- Full name: Tonislav Yordanov Yordanov
- Date of birth: 27 November 1998 (age 27)
- Place of birth: Sevlievo, Bulgaria
- Height: 1.80 m (5 ft 11 in)
- Position: Forward

Team information
- Current team: Kisvárda
- Number: 99

Youth career
- 2005–2010: Vidima-Rakovski
- 2010–2016: Litex Lovech

Senior career*
Years	Team	Apps	(Gls)
2015–2016	Litex Lovech II	14	(1)
2015–2016	Litex Lovech	0	(0)
2016–2017	CSKA Sofia II	19	(4)
2016–2021	CSKA Sofia	2	(0)
2017	→ Litex Lovech (loan)	14	(4)
2018–2019	→ Litex Lovech (loan)	40	(21)
2020	→ Etar (loan)	8	(5)
2021–2022	Arda Kardzhali	66	(18)
2022–2023	Beroe Stara Zagora	19	(6)
2023–2025	Arda Kardzhali	66	(17)
2025–	Kisvárda	21	(4)

International career^{‡}
2011–2015	Bulgaria U17	18	(22)
2015–2017	Bulgaria U19	24	(6)
2017–2020	Bulgaria U21	16	(6)
2026–	Bulgaria	3	(1)
- * Club domestic league appearances and goals as of 30 May 2026 ‡ National team caps and goals as of 5 June 2026

Tonislav Yordanov Yordanov (Bulgarian: Тонислав Йорданов Йорданов; born 27 November 1998) is a Bulgarian professional footballer who plays as a forward for Kisvárda and the Bulgaria national team.

== Club career ==
=== Litex Lovech ===
Yordanov joined Litex Lovech in 2010 coming from Vidima-Rakovski. In 2014–15 season he became vice champion with the U17 team scoring 42 goals. His talent was noticed by Litex Lovech scouts and as a result Tonislav moved to this club's academy in 2010.

From the 2015–16 season he was promoted to the newly created second team of Litex in B Group. He made his debut for Litex II on 26 Juny 2015 in match against Dobrudzha Dobrich.

In the summer of 2015, he also joined the first team in the pre-season camp. He made his unofficial debut for the team against AC Omonia. Four days later he played and in the match against Vereya. He made his official debut for the team in a cup match on 22 September 2015 against Lokomotiv 2012 Mezdra. He also scored his debut goal for the team.

=== CSKA Sofia ===
In the summer of 2016, he moved to CSKA Sofia alongside most of the Litex players.

Yordanov made his official debut for the team in First League on 31 May 2017 against Dunav Ruse. He signed his first professional contract with the team on 6 June 2017 alongside Slavi Petrov and Angel Lyaskov.

==== Litex Lovech (loan) ====
In July 2017, Yordanov was loaned to Litex Lovech.

=== Beroe ===
In December 2022, Yordanov signed for Beroe Stara Zagora. In July 2023, he left the team by mutual consent.

== International career ==
On 5 September 2019, he scored three goals for the Bulgaria U21 team in the 4:0 away win over Estonia U21 in a 2021 UEFA Euro qualifier.

== Style of play ==
Yordanov has been described as having an eye for goal and being very good from set pieces.

== Career statistics ==
=== Club ===
As of 10 August 2025

Club performance			League		Cup		Continental		Other		Total	
Club	League	Season	Apps	Goals	Apps	Goals	Apps	Goals	Apps	Goals	Apps	Goals
Bulgaria			League		Bulgarian Cup		Europe		Other (Note: Includes Bulgarian Supercup matches.)		Total	
Litex Lovech II	B Group	2015–16	14	1	—		—		—		14	1
Litex Lovech	A Group	2015–16	0	0	1	1	0	0	—		1	1
CSKA Sofia II	Second League	2016–17	19	4	—		—		—		19	4
CSKA Sofia	First League	2016–17	1	0	0	0	—		—		1	0
CSKA Sofia	First League	2018–19	0	0	0	0	2	0	—		2	0
CSKA Sofia	First League	2019–20	0	0	0	0	0	0	—		0	0
CSKA Sofia	First League	2020–21	1	0	0	0	0	0	—		1	0
CSKA Sofia	Total		2	0	0	0	2	0	0	0	4	0
Litex Lovech (loan)	Second League	2017–18	14	4	3	0	—		—		17	4
Litex Lovech (loan)	Second League	2018–19	23	10	0	0	—		—		23	10
Litex Lovech (loan)	Second League	2019–20	17	11	1	2	—		—		18	13
Litex Lovech (loan)	Total		54	25	4	2	0	0	0	0	58	27
Etar (loan)	First League	2019–20	8	5	—		—		—		8	5
Arda Kardzhali	First League	2020–21	16	8	5	0	—		—		21	8
Arda Kardzhali	First League	2021–22	32	9	2	1	2	0	—		36	10
Arda Kardzhali	First League	2022–23	18	1	2	0	—		—		20	1
Arda Kardzhali	Total		66	18	7	1	2	0	0	0	77	19
Beroe	First League	2022–23	17	6	0	0	—		—		17	6
Beroe	First League	2023–24	2	0	0	0	—		—		2	0
Beroe	Total		19	6	0	0	0	0	0	0	19	6
Arda Kardzhali	First League	2023–24	31	6	3	4	—		—		34	10
Arda Kardzhali	First League	2024–25	35	11	3	1	—		1	0	39	12
Arda Kardzhali	Total		66	17	6	5	0	0	1	0	73	22
Kisvárda	NB I	2025–26	3	1	0	0	—		—		3	1
Career statistics			251	77	18	9	4	0	1	0	276	86

=== International ===
As of match played 5 June 2026

Appearances and goals by national team and year
National team	Year	Apps	Goals
Bulgaria
Bulgaria	2026	3	1
Total		3	1

Scores and results list Bulgaria's goal tally first, score column indicates score after each Yordanov goal.

List of international goals scored by Tonislav yordanov
No.	Date	Venue	Opponent	Score	Result	Competition
1	27 March 2026	Gelora Bung Karno Stadium, Jakarta, Indonesia	Solomon Islands	2–0	10–2	2026 FIFA Series
