= Levente Szőr =

Hungarian footballer

Personal information
- Date of birth: 14 January 2001 (age 25)
- Place of birth: Kisvárda, Hungary
- Height: 1.82 m (6 ft 0 in)
- Position: Left winger

Team information
- Current team: Tiszakécske
- Number: 30

Youth career
- 2008–2020: Kisvárda

Senior career*
Years	Team	Apps	(Gls)
2018–	Kisvárda	5	(0)
2018–	→ Kisvárda II	75	(7)
2023–	→ Tiszakécske (loan)	10	(0)
- * Club domestic league appearances and goals as of 21 December 2023

Levente Szőr (born 14 January 2001) is a Hungarian professional footballer who plays for Tiszakécske on loan from Kisvárda.

== Career statistics ==
As of 15 May 2021.

Appearances and goals by club, season and competition
Club	Season	League			Cup		Continental		Other		Total	
Club	Season	Division	Apps	Goals	Apps	Goals	Apps	Goals	Apps	Goals	Apps	Goals
Kisvárda	2017–18	Nemzeti Bajnokság II	1	0	0	0	—		0	0	1	0
Kisvárda	2018–19	Nemzeti Bajnokság I	0	0	0	0	—		0	0	0	0
Kisvárda	2019–20	Nemzeti Bajnokság I	2	0	0	0	—		0	0	2	0
Kisvárda	2020–21	Nemzeti Bajnokság I	1	0	0	0	—		0	0	1	0
Kisvárda	Total		4	0	0	0	0	0	0	0	4	0
Kisvárda II	2018–19	Megyei Bajnokság I	22	1	0	0	—		0	0	22	1
Kisvárda II	2019–20	Megyei Bajnokság I	18	4	0	0	—		0	0	18	4
Kisvárda II	2020–21	Nemzeti Bajnokság III	35	2	0	0	—		0	0	35	2
Kisvárda II	Total		75	7	0	0	0	0	0	0	75	7
Career total			79	7	0	0	0	0	0	0	79	7
