= Sinan Medgyes =

Slovak footballer (born 1993)

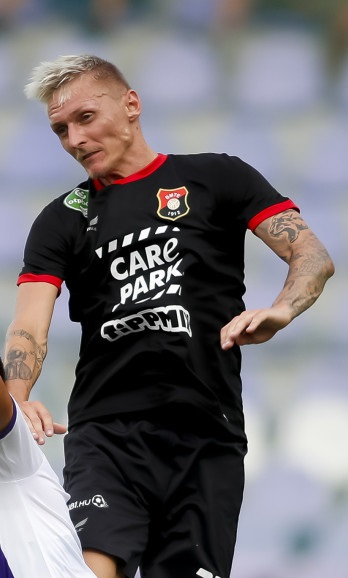
- Medgyes playing for Budafok in 2020

Personal information
- Date of birth: 30 June 1993 (age 33)
- Place of birth: Dunajská Streda, Slovakia
- Height: 1.85 m (6 ft 1 in)
- Position: Left-back

Team information
- Current team: Kisvárda
- Number: 23

Youth career
- 2010–2011: Győr

Senior career*
| Years | Team | Apps | (Gls) |
| 2011–2015 | Győr II | 66 | (9) |
| 2013–2015 | Győr | 1 | (0) |
| 2015–2016 | Duslo Šaľa | 14 | (0) |
| 2017–2018 | Győr II | 4 | (0) |
| 2016–2017 | → Sereď (loan) | 17 | (5) |
| 2017–2018 | → Budaörs (loan) | 34 | (2) |
| 2018–2020 | Budaörs | 54 | (1) |
| 2020–2021 | Budafok | 30 | (1) |
| 2021–2022 | Paks | 23 | (1) |
| 2022–2023 | MTK Budapest | 18 | (0) |
| 2023 | Diósgyőr | 11 | (1) |
| 2023–2025 | Zalaegerszeg | 44 | (2) |
| 2025– | Kisvárda | 15 | (0) |
- * Club domestic league appearances and goals as of 30 May 2026

Sinan Medgyes (born 30 June 1993) is a Slovak professional footballer who plays as a left-back for Nemzeti Bajnokság I club Kisvárda.

== Club career ==
On 31 August 2021, Medgyes signed a two-year contract with Paks.

On 23 June 2025, Medgyes signed with Kisvárda.

== Career statistics ==
As of 15 May 2021.

Appearances and goals by club, season and competition
| Club | Season | League | | | Cup | | Continental | | Other | | Total | |
| Club | Season | Division | Apps | Goals | Apps | Goals | Apps | Goals | Apps | Goals | Apps | Goals |
|---|---|---|---|---|---|---|---|---|---|---|---|---|
| Győr II | 2011–12 | Nemzeti Bajnokság II | 1 | 0 | 0 | 0 | — | | — | | 1 | 0 |
| Győr II | 2012–13 | Nemzeti Bajnokság II | 13 | 1 | 0 | 0 | — | | — | | 13 | 1 |
| Győr II | 2013–14 | Nemzeti Bajnokság II | 26 | 2 | 0 | 0 | — | | — | | 26 | 2 |
| Győr II | 2014–15 | Nemzeti Bajnokság II | 26 | 6 | 0 | 0 | — | | — | | 26 | 6 |
| Győr II | 2016–17 | Nemzeti Bajnokság II | 4 | 0 | 0 | 0 | — | | — | | 4 | 0 |
| Győr II | Total | | 70 | 9 | 0 | 0 | 0 | 0 | 0 | 0 | 70 | 9 |
| Győr | 2013–14 | Nemzeti Bajnokság I | 0 | 0 | 0 | 0 | — | | 2 | 0 | 2 | 0 |
| Győr | 2014–15 | Nemzeti Bajnokság I | 1 | 0 | 0 | 0 | — | | 2 | 0 | 3 | 0 |
| Győr | Total | | 1 | 0 | 0 | 0 | 0 | 0 | 4 | 0 | 5 | 0 |
| Duslo Šaľa | 2015–16 | 2. Liga | 14 | 0 | 0 | 0 | — | | — | | 14 | 0 |
| Duslo Šaľa | Total | | 14 | 0 | 0 | 0 | 0 | 0 | 0 | 0 | 14 | 0 |
| Sereď | 2016–17 | 2. Liga | 17 | 5 | 3 | 1 | — | | — | | 20 | 6 |
| Sereď | Total | | 17 | 5 | 3 | 1 | 0 | 0 | 0 | 0 | 20 | 6 |
| Budaörs | 2017–18 | Nemzeti Bajnokság II | 34 | 2 | 2 | 0 | — | | — | | 36 | 2 |
| Budaörs | 2018–19 | Nemzeti Bajnokság II | 32 | 1 | 6 | 4 | — | | — | | 38 | 5 |
| Budaörs | 2019–20 | Nemzeti Bajnokság II | 22 | 0 | 2 | 1 | — | | — | | 24 | 1 |
| Budaörs | Total | | 88 | 3 | 10 | 5 | 0 | 0 | 0 | 0 | 98 | 8 |
| Budafok | 2020–21 | Nemzeti Bajnokság I | 27 | 1 | 4 | 0 | — | | — | | 31 | 1 |
| Budafok | Total | | 27 | 1 | 4 | 0 | 0 | 0 | 0 | 0 | 31 | 1 |
| Career total | | | 217 | 18 | 17 | 6 | 0 | 0 | 4 | 0 | 238 | 24 |
