= Marcell Kovács =

Hungarian footballer (born 2003)

Personal information
- Date of birth: 9 February 2003 (age 23)
- Place of birth: Nyíregyháza, Hungary
- Position: Goalkeeper

Team information
- Current team: Kisvárda
- Number: 1

Youth career
- 2007–2013: Záhony
- 2013: Görög Focisuli-KGYFC
- 2013–2015: Cigánd
- 2015–2016: Kisvárda
- 2016–2019: Diósgyőr
- 2019–2022: Ferencváros

Senior career*
Years	Team	Apps	(Gls)
2020–2023	Ferencváros II	21	(0)
2020–2023	Ferencváros	0	(0)
2022	→ Soroksár (loan)	21	(0)
2023–	Kisvárda	28	(0)
2024–	Kisvárda II	1	(0)

International career^{‡}
2018	Hungary U15	2	(0)
2019	Hungary U16	2	(0)
2019–2020	Hungary U17	3	(0)
- * Club domestic league appearances and goals as of 15 August 2025 ‡ National team caps and goals as of 5 February 2020

Marcell Kovács (born 9 February 2003) is a Hungarian professional footballer, who plays as a goalkeeper for Nemzeti Bajnokság I club Kisvárda.

== Career ==
On 17 July 2020, Kovács was announced to have signed a professional contract with Nemzeti Bajnokság I side Ferencváros.

He completed a transfer to Nemzeti Bajnokság I club Kisvárda on 16 June 2023.

== Career statistics ==
As of match played 15 August 2025

Appearances and goals by club, season and competition
Club	Season	League			National cup (Note: Includes Magyar Kupa)		Europe		Total	
Club	Season	Division	Apps	Goals	Apps	Goals	Apps	Goals	Apps	Goals
Ferencváros II	2020–21	Nemzeti Bajnokság III	2	0	—		—		2	0
Ferencváros II	2021–22	Nemzeti Bajnokság III	19	0	—		—		19	0
Ferencváros II	Total		21	0	—		—		21	0
Ferencváros	2020–21	Nemzeti Bajnokság I	0	0	—		—		0	0
Soroksár (loan)	2022–23	Nemzeti Bajnokság II	21	0	—		—		21	0
Kisvárda	2023–24	Nemzeti Bajnokság I	19	0	2	0	—		21	0
Kisvárda	2024–25	Nemzeti Bajnokság II	9	0	3	0	—		12	0
Kisvárda	2025–26	Nemzeti Bajnokság I	0	0	0	0	—		0	0
Kisvárda	Total		28	0	5	0	—		33	0
Kisvárda II	2024–25	Nemzeti Bajnokság III	1	0	—		—		1	0
Career total			71	0	5	0	—		76	0

== Honours ==
Ferencváros

- Nemzeti Bajnokság I: 2020–21

Kisvárda

- Nemzeti Bajnokság II: 2024–25
