= Kostajnica, Konjic =

Kostajnica Костајница
- Village
- Location within Bosnia and Herzegovina
- Country: Bosnia and Herzegovina
- Entity: Federation of Bosnia and Herzegovina
- Canton: Herzegovina-Neretva
- Municipality: Konjic

Area
  - Total: 1.78 sq mi (4.60 km^{2})

Population (2013)
  - Total: 39
  - Density: 22/sq mi (8.5/km^{2})
- Time zone: UTC+1 (CET)
  - Summer (DST): UTC+2 (CEST)

Kostajnica (Cyrillic: Костајница) is a village in the municipality of Konjic, Bosnia and Herzegovina.

== Demographics ==
According to the 2013 census, its population was 39.

Ethnicity in 2013
Ethnicity	Number	Percentage
Croats	33	84.6%
Bosniaks	6	15.4%
Total	39	100%
