= Alfa Baldé =

Portuguese footballer (born 2005)

Personal information
- Full name: Alfa Mussá Baldé
- Date of birth: 2 February 2005 (age 21)
- Height: 1.70 m (5 ft 7 in)
- Position: Right winger

Team information
- Current team: RFS
- Number: 19

Youth career
- 2017–2018: Ponte Frielas
- 2018–2022: Benfica
- 2022–2024: Porto

Senior career*
Years	Team	Apps	(Gls)
2024–2025	Porto B	1	(0)
2025–2026	Radnički 1923	45	(1)
2026–	RFS	9	(2)

International career^{‡}
2019	Portugal U15	1	(0)
2021	Portugal U16	2	(0)
2021	Portugal U17	8	(1)
- * Club domestic league appearances and goals as of 12 November 2026 ‡ National team caps and goals as of 15 February 2022

Alfa Mussá Baldé (born 2 February 2005) is a professional footballer who plays as a right winger for Latvian club RFS. Born in Guinea-Bissau, he has represented Portugal at youth level.

== Club career ==
Baldé is a youth product of Benfica and Porto. On 28 June 2019, as a 14-year-old, Baldé signed a development contract with Benfica. On 8 August 2022 he signed his first professional contract with Porto.

On 17 July 2024, Baldé moved from Porto U19 to Porto B, and he was listed for Porto's pre-season training camp which was held in the Arcos de Valdevez.

On 11 August he debuted in Liga Portugal 2 for Porto B in a 1–1 home draw against Alverca.

On 9 January 2025, Radnički 1923 announced that they had signed a three-year contract with Baldé. He made his official debut in the Serbian SuperLiga on 8 February in a match against Red Star Belgrade.

== International career ==
Baldé represented Portugal at the under-15, under-16 and under-17 levels.
