= Miloš Kruščić =

Serbian footballer and manager

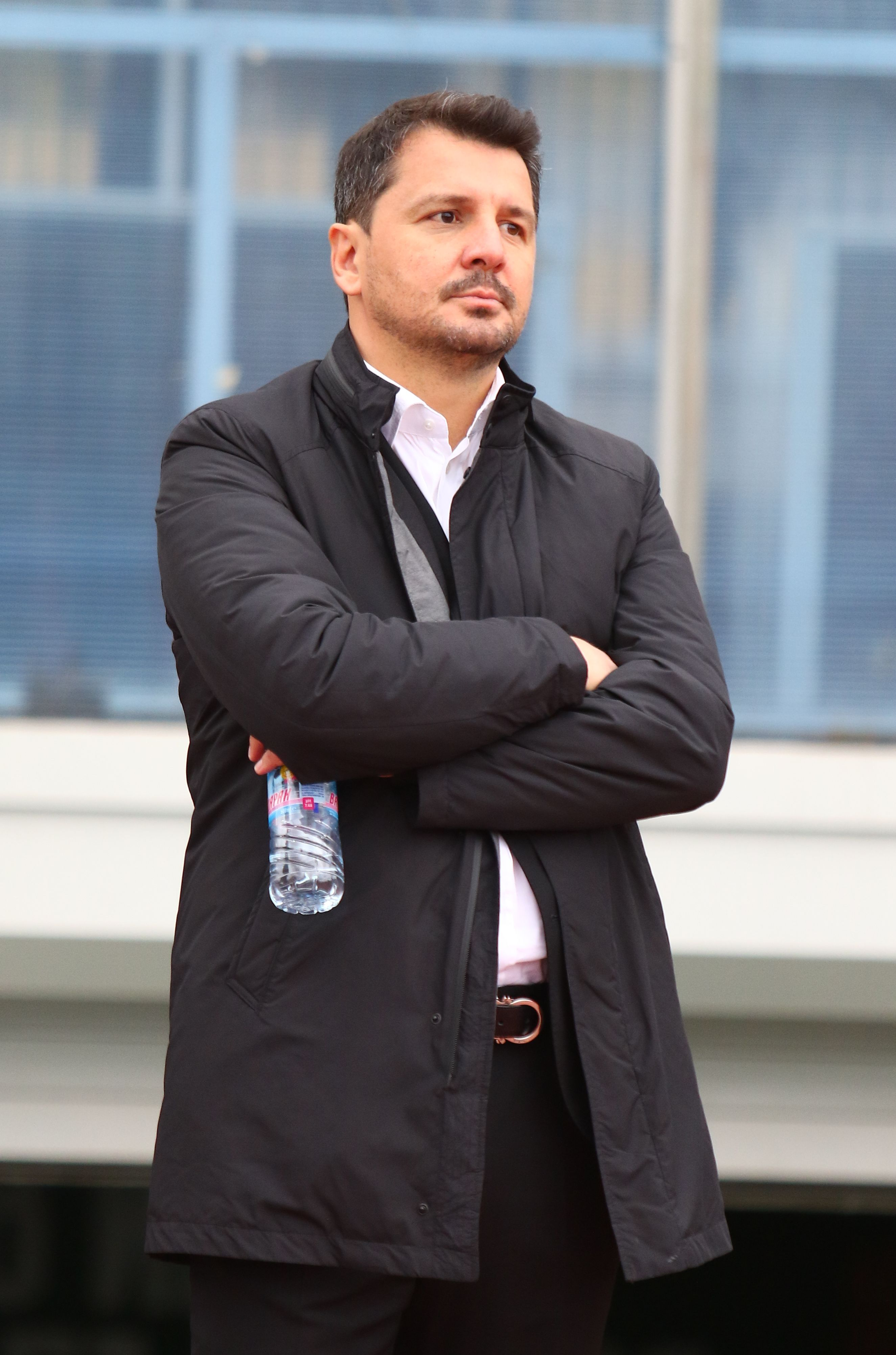
- Kruščić managing CSKA Sofia in 2020

Personal information
- Date of birth: 3 October 1976 (age 50)
- Place of birth: Belgrade, SFR Yugoslavia
- Height: 1.78 m (5 ft 10 in)
- Position: Defender

Youth career
- Partizan

Senior career*
Years	Team	Apps	(Gls)
1995–1996	Radnički Beograd		
1997–1998	Palilulac Beograd		
1998–1999	Spartak Subotica	12	(0)
1999–2001	Zemun	63	(5)
2001–2007	Rostov	167	(8)

International career
2001	FR Yugoslavia XI	2	(0)

Managerial career
- 2011–2013: Taraz (assistant)
- 2015: Litex Lovech (assistant)
- 2015–2017: Spartak Subotica (assistant)
- 2017–2018: Metalac Gornji Milanovac
- 2018: Zemun
- 2019: CSKA Sofia (analyst)
- 2019–2020: CSKA Sofia
- 2022–2023: Újpest
- 2023: Kisvárda
- 2024: Spartak Subotica
- * Club domestic league appearances and goals

Miloš Kruščić (Serbian Cyrillic: Милош Крушчић; born 3 October 1976) is a Serbian football manager and a former professional player.

In January 2001, Kruščić represented FR Yugoslavia at the Millennium Super Soccer Cup in India, as the team won the tournament. He made two appearances in the process.

== Managerial career ==
=== Újpest ===
On 13 January 2022, he was appointed as the new coach of Újpest FC.

On 22 March 2023, he was sacked from Újpest after losing 5-1 to Puskás Akadémia FC in the 2022–23 Nemzeti Bajnokság I season.

=== Kisvárda ===
On 27 March 2023, he was appointed as the new coach of Kisvárda FC.

On 12 August 2023, he was sacked after a draw against MTK Budapest FC at the Hidegkuti Nándor Stadion in the 2023–24 Nemzeti Bajnokság I.

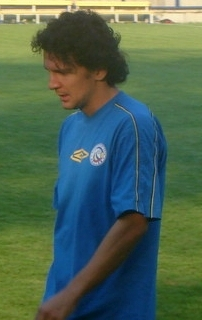
Kruščić as a player with Rostov in 2007

== Career statistics ==
Season	Club	Division	Apps	Goals
Yugoslavia
1999–00	Zemun	D1	32	2
2000–01	Zemun	D1	31	3
Russia
2001	Rostov	D1	11	0
2002	Rostov	D1	20	1
2003	Rostov	D1	26	1
2004	Rostov	D1	27	2
2005	Rostov	D1	28	1
2006	Rostov	D1	30	3
2007	Rostov	D1	25	0
Yugoslavia			63	5
Russia			167	8
Total			230	13
