= Tibor Lippai =

Hungarian footballer (born 1997)

Personal information
- Date of birth: 24 December 1997 (age 28)
- Place of birth: Kisvárda, Hungary
- Position: Defender

Team information
- Current team: Kisvárda
- Number: 42

Youth career
- 2005–2007: Fényeslitke
- 2007–2008: Tuzsér
- 2008–2010: Vasas-Pasarét
- 2010–2011: Vasas Akadémia
- 2011–2016: Debrecen
- 2015–2016: → Hajdúböszörmény (loan)

Senior career*
Years	Team	Apps	(Gls)
2015–2016	→ Hajdúböszörmény (loan)	1	(0)
2016–2017	Balkány	26	(4)
2017–2018	Hajdúböszörmény	28	(16)
2018–2020	Tiszaújváros	40	(1)
2020–2022	Füzesgyarmat	64	(4)
2022–2023	Kazincbarcika	28	(3)
2023–	Kisvárda	45	(3)
2023–	Kisvárda II	2	(0)
- * Club domestic league appearances and goals as of 30 May 2026

Tibor Lippai (born 24 December 1997) is a Hungarian professional footballer, who plays as a defender for Nemzeti Bajnokság I club Kisvárda.

== Career ==
On 14 June 2023, Nemzeti Bajnokság I side Kisvárda announced Lippai as their first signing ahead of the new season.

== Career statistics ==
As of match played 17 August 2025

Appearances and goals by club, season and competition
Club	Season	League			Magyar Kupa		Other		Total	
Club	Season	Division	Apps	Goals	Apps	Goals	Apps	Goals	Apps	Goals
Hajdúböszörmény (loan)	2015–16	Megyei Bajnokság I	1	0	—		1 (Note: Appearance in Hajdú–Bihar Cup)	0	2	0
Balkány	2016–17	Megyei Bajnokság I	26	4	1	0	5 (Note: Three appearances and one goal in Magyar Kupa qualifying rounds, two appearances in Szabolcs–Szatmár–Bereg Cup)	1	32	5
Hajdúböszörmény	2017–18	Megyei Bajnokság I	28	16	—		7 (Note: Two appearances and two goal in Magyar Kupa qualifying rounds, three appearances in Hajdú–Bihar Cup, two appearances and one goal in Megyei Bajnokság I promotion play-offs)	3	35	19
Tiszaújváros	2018–19	Nemzeti Bajnokság III	24	1	3	0	—		27	1
Tiszaújváros	2019–20	Nemzeti Bajnokság III	16	0	2	0	—		18	0
Tiszaújváros	Total		40	1	5	0	—		45	1
Füzesgyarmat	2020–21	Nemzeti Bajnokság III	28	1	1	0	—		29	1
Füzesgyarmat	2021–22	Nemzeti Bajnokság III	36	3	1	0	—		37	3
Füzesgyarmat	Total		64	4	2	0	—		66	4
Kazincbarcika	2022–23	Nemzeti Bajnokság II	28	3	2	0	—		30	3
Kisvárda	2023–24	Nemzeti Bajnokság I	16	0	4	0	—		20	0
Kisvárda	2024–25	Nemzeti Bajnokság II	20	3	3	0	—		23	3
Kisvárda	2025–26	Nemzeti Bajnokság I	0	0	0	0	—		0	0
Kisvárda	Total		36	3	7	0	—		43	3
Kisvárda II	2023–24	Nemzeti Bajnokság III	1	0	—		—		1	0
Kisvárda II	2025–26	Nemzeti Bajnokság III	1	0	—		—		1	0
Kisvárda II	Total		2	0	—		—		2	0
Career total			225	31	17	0	13	4	255	35

== Honours ==
Hajdúböszörmény

- Megyei Bajnokság I – Hajdú–Bihar: 2015–16, 2017–18

Balkány

- Megyei Bajnokság I – Szabolcs–Szatmár–Bereg: 2016–17
- Szabolcs–Szatmár–Bereg Cup: 2017

Kisvárda

- Nemzeti Bajnokság II: 2024–25
