= Nikola Radmanovac =

Serbian footballer (born 1997)

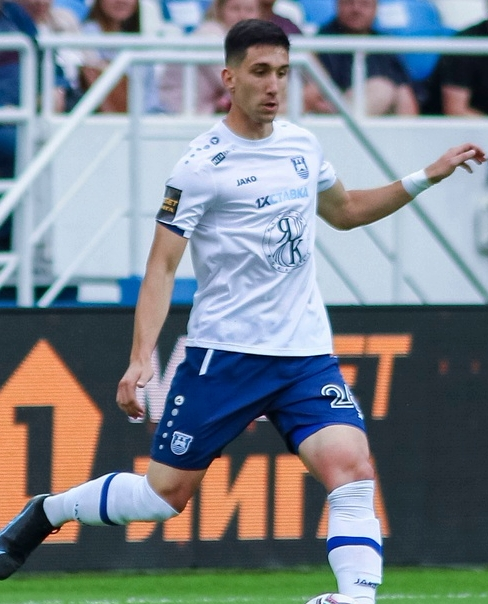

Personal information
- Date of birth: 30 January 1997 (age 29)
- Place of birth: Kruševac, FR Yugoslavia
- Height: 1.89 m (6 ft 2 in)
- Position: Centre-back

Team information
- Current team: Kisvárda
- Number: 26

Youth career
- Napredak Kruševac

Senior career*
Years	Team	Apps	(Gls)
2014–2021	Napredak Kruševac	5	(0)
2016	→ Prva Petoletka (loan)	3	(0)
2017	→ Brodarac 1947 (loan)	8	(0)
2017	→ Bežanija (loan)	0	(0)
2018–2020	→ Trayal (loan)	52	(2)
2020–2022	Radnik Surdulica	54	(1)
2022–2024	Baltika Kaliningrad	56	(1)
2024–2025	Qingdao Hainiu	40	(0)
2026–	Kisvárda	14	(0)

International career^{‡}
2014	Serbia U17		
- * Club domestic league appearances and goals as of 30 May 2026 ‡ National team caps and goals as of 30 May 2016

Nikola Radmanovac (Serbian Cyrillic: Никола Радмановац; born 30 January 1997) is a Serbian professional footballer who plays as a centre-back for Kisvárda.

== Club career ==
=== Napredak Kruševac ===
Born in Kruševac, Radmanovac passed the Napredak Kruševac youth school. He has joined the first team for the 2014–15 season, but he stayed with U19 selection until 2016. Previously, he signed a two-year scholarship contract with club in summer 2015. He made his senior debut in 25 fixture match of 2015–16 Serbian First League season, against Kolubara, replacing Bohdan Sichkaruk in 71 minute of the match. After Miloš Vulić was substituted out in the second half the last match of the 2015–16 Serbian First League season, Radmanovac spent the rest of match as a team captain. In summer 2016, Radmanovac was loaned to Serbian League East side Prva Petoletka for a one-year dual registration, which was terminated after 6 months. He also spent the spring half-season as a loaned player with Brodarac 1947. In summer 2017, Radmanovac signed a two-year professional contract with Napredak, after which he moved on loan deal to Bežanija. At the beginning 2018, Radmanovac returned to Napredak. In mid season of the 2017–18 campaign, Radmanovac moved on loan to the local club Trayal until the end of the 2017–18 campaign in the Serbian League East.

=== Russia ===
On 16 June 2022, Radmanovac signed with Russian Football National League side Baltika Kaliningrad for the term of 3 years with an option for fourth year.

== Career statistics ==
As of match played 22 November 2025

Appearances and goals by club, season and competition
Club	Season	League			Cup		Continental		Other		Total	
Club	Season	Division	Apps	Goals	Apps	Goals	Apps	Goals	Apps	Goals	Apps	Goals
Napredak Kruševac	2014–15	Serbian SuperLiga	0	0	0	0	—		0	0	0	0
Napredak Kruševac	2015–16	Serbian First League	5	0	0	0	—		—		5	0
Napredak Kruševac	2016–17	Serbian SuperLiga	0	0	0	0	—		—		0	0
Napredak Kruševac	2017–18	Serbian SuperLiga	0	0	—		—		—		0	0
Napredak Kruševac	Total		5	0	0	0	—		0	0	5	0
Prva Petoletka (loan)	2016–17	Serbian League East	3	0	—		—		—		3	0
Brodarac 1947 (loan)	2016–17	Serbian League Belgrade	8	0	—		—		—		8	0
Bežanija (loan)	2017–18	Serbian First League	0	0	0	0	—		—		0	0
Trayal (loan)	2018–19	Serbian League East	28	2	—		—		—		28	2
Trayal (loan)	2019–20	Serbian SuperLiga	24	0	1	0	—		—		25	0
Trayal (loan)	Total		52	2	1	0	—		—		53	2
Radnik Surdulica	2020–21	Serbian SuperLiga	19	0	3	0	—		—		22	0
Radnik Surdulica	2021–22	Serbian SuperLiga	35	1	2	0	—		—		37	1
Radnik Surdulica	Total		54	1	5	0	—		—		59	1
Baltika Kaliningrad	2022–23	Russian First League	33	1	1	0	—		—		34	1
Baltika Kaliningrad	2023–24	Russian Premier League	23	0	7	0	—		—		30	0
Baltika Kaliningrad	Total		56	1	8	0	—		—		64	1
Qingdao Hainiu	2024	Chinese Super League	11	0	1	0	—		—		12	0
Qingdao Hainiu	2025	Chinese Super League	29	0	1	0	—		—		30	0
Qingdao Hainiu	Total		40	0	2	0	—		—		42	0
Career total			192	4	16	0	—		0	0	208	4

== Honours ==
Napredak Kruševac

- Serbian First League: 2015–16
