= João Janeiro =

Portuguese manager

Personal information
- Full name: João Pedro de Oliveira Janeiro
- Date of birth: 29 June 1981 (age 45)
- Place of birth: Lisbon, Portugal

Team information
- Current team: Żabbar St. Patrick

Managerial career
- Years: Team
- 2012–2015: Belenenses (assistant)
- 2015: Estoril Praia (analyst)
- 2015–2016: Loures (assistant)
- 2016–2017: Cova da Piedade B
- 2017–2018: 1º Dezembro (assistant)
- 2018: Tulsa Roughnecks
- 2018–2020: Szeged-Csanád
- 2021: Kisvárda
- 2021–2022: DAC Dunajská Streda
- 2022: Debrecen
- 2023: FC U Craiova
- 2024: Żabbar St. Patrick
- 2024-2025: Manama Club

João Pedro de Oliveira Janeiro (born 29 June 1981), known simply as João Janeiro, is a Portuguese professional football manager, who was most recently in charge of Liga I club FC U Craiova.

== Career ==
=== Debrecen ===
On 27 June 2022, he was appointed as the new coach of Nemzeti Bajnokság I club Debreceni VSC. His team drew four time and lost twice during the 2022–23 season. On 30 August 2022, Debreceni suffered a 4–2 defeat against Zalaegerszegi TE. The following day, on 31 August 2022, he was sacked from the club.

On 3 June 2023, he was announced as the new manager of Romanian side FC U Craiova. He only lasted 18 days in his position before leaving the club on 21 June, without managing the team in a single game.

== Managerial statistics ==
As of 26 December 2023

Team	Nat	From	To	Record							
Team	Nat	From	To	P	W	D	L	GF	GA	GD	W%
Tulsa Roughnecks	(United States)	1 May 2018	1 October 2018	26	3	9	14	32	62	−30	11.5
Szeged-Csanád	(Hungary)	11 November 2018	4 May 2020	28	9	10	9	35	31	+4	32.1
Kisvárda	(Hungary)	20 May 2021	9 November 2021	14	9	2	3	26	15	+11	64.3
DAC Dunajská Streda	(Slovakia)	10 November 2021	30 June 2022	19	8	7	4	25	20	+5	42.1
Debrecen	(Hungary)	1 July 2022	31 August 2022	6	0	4	2	9	13	−4	0.0
FC U Craiova	(Romania)	3 June 2023	21 June 2023	0	0	0	0	0	0	+0	—
Żabbar St. Patrick	(Malta)	16 May 2024	Present	0	0	0	0	0	0	+0	—
Total				93	29	32	32	127	141	−14	31.2
