= Miloš Spasić =

Austrian footballer (born 1998)

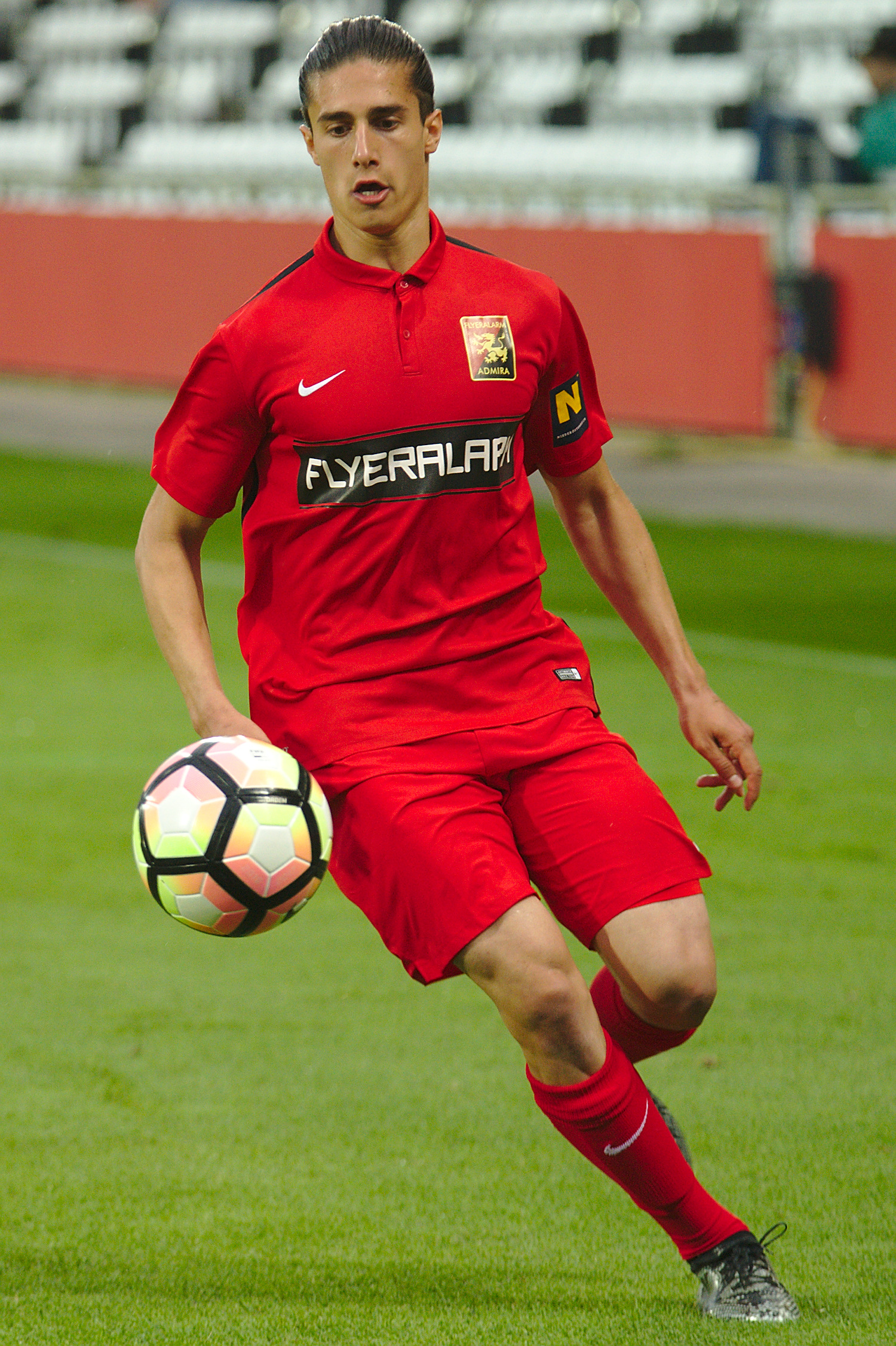
- Spasić with Admira Wacker in 2017

Personal information
- Date of birth: 29 January 1998 (age 28)
- Place of birth: Vienna, Austria
- Height: 1.82 m (6 ft 0 in)
- Position: Defender

Team information
- Current team: TWL Elektra
- Number: 3

Youth career
- 2007–2009: Rennweger SV
- 2009–2013: Austria Wien
- 2013–2016: Admira Wacker

Senior career*
Years	Team	Apps	(Gls)
2016–2021	Admira Wacker II	60	(2)
2018–2021	Admira Wacker	27	(0)
2022	Kavala	18	(0)
2023	Riteriai	12	(0)
2024–2025	Floridsdorfer AC	20	(0)
2025	Stripfing	10	(0)
2026–	TWL Elektra	11	(0)

International career^{‡}
2016	Serbia U18	1	(0)
- * Club domestic league appearances and goals as of 28 June 2026 ‡ National team caps and goals as of 29 April 2016

Miloš Spasić (born 29 January 1998) is a professional footballer who plays as a centre-back for TWL Elektra. Born in Austria, he represented Serbia on junior international level.

== Club career ==
Started career at Admira Wacker. In 2022, he moved to Kavala before moving again to Riteriai the following year. In 2023 he signed with Lithuanian Riteriai Club, He made his debut in A Lyga on 3 March 2023 against FA Šiauliai and finished in July 2023.
