= Marko Matanović =

Montenegrin footballer

Personal information
- Date of birth: 17 July 2000 (age 26)
- Place of birth: Podgorica, FR Yugoslavia
- Height: 1.80 m (5 ft 11 in)
- Position: Midfielder

Team information
- Current team: Kisvárda
- Number: 11

Youth career
- OFK Titograd

Senior career*
Years	Team	Apps	(Gls)
2020	OFK Titograd	8	(0)
2020–2021	Jezero	34	(1)
2021–2023	Sutjeska Nikšić	80	(10)
2023–2025	Sarajevo	13	(0)
2024–2025	→ Kisvárda (loan)	23	(5)
2025–	Kisvárda	28	(1)

International career
2021	Montenegro U21	3	(0)
- * Club domestic league appearances and goals as of 30 May 2026

Marko Matanović (Montenegrin: Марко Матановић; born 17 July 2000) is a Montenegrin professional footballer who plays as a midfielder for Nemzeti Bajnokság I club Kisvárda.

== Career statistics ==
=== Club ===
As of match played 25 May 2025

Appearances and goals by club, season and competition
Club	Season	League			National cup (Note: Includes Montenegrin Cup, Bosnia and Herzegovina Cup, Magyar Kupa)		Continental		Total	
Club	Season	Division	Apps	Goals	Apps	Goals	Apps	Goals	Apps	Goals
OFK Titograd	2019–20	Montenegrin First League	8	0	3	1	0	0	11	1
Jezero	2020–21	Montenegrin First League	34	1	1	0	—		35	1
Sutjeska Nikšić	2021–22	Montenegrin First League	29	5	3	0	4 (Note: Appearance(s) in UEFA Europa Conference League)	0	36	5
Sutjeska Nikšić	2022–23	Montenegrin First League	35	3	5	0	4 (Note: Two appearances in UEFA Champions League; two appearances in UEFA Europa Conference League)	0	44	3
Sutjeska Nikšić	2023–24	Montenegrin First League	16	2	1	0	4	0	21	2
Sutjeska Nikšić	Total		80	10	9	0	12	0	101	10
Sarajevo	2023–24	Bosnian Premier League	11	0	3	0	—		14	0
Sarajevo	2024–25	Bosnian Premier League	2	0	—		0	0	2	0
Sarajevo	Total		13	0	3	0	0	0	16	0
Kisvárda (loan)	2024–25	Nemzeti Bajnokság II	23	5	4	0	—		27	5
Career total			158	16	20	1	12	0	190	17

== Honours ==
Sutjeska Nikšić

- Montenegrin First League: 2021–22
- Montenegrin Cup: 2022–23

Kisvárda

- Nemzeti Bajnokság II: 2024–25
