= Bence Bíró =

Hungarian footballer

Personal information
- Full name: Bence Balázs Bíró
- Date of birth: 14 July 1998 (age 28)
- Place of birth: Budapest, Hungary
- Height: 1.85 m (6 ft 1 in)
- Position: Forward

Team information
- Current team: Kisvárda
- Number: 29

Youth career
- 2006–2007: Ferencváros
- 2007–2009: Dalnoki Akadémia
- 2009–2010: MTK Hungária
- 2010–2014: Honvéd
- 2014–2017: Vitória Guimarães

Senior career*
Years	Team	Apps	(Gls)
2016–2020	Vitória Guimarães B	50	(2)
2020–2022	MTK Budapest	22	(0)
2021–2022	→ Pécs (loan)	37	(6)
2022–2024	Szeged-Csanád	63	(15)
2024–	Kisvárda	57	(8)

International career^{‡}
2016	Hungary U-18	3	(0)
2016–2017	Hungary U-19	9	(3)
2017–2021	Hungary U-21	21	(8)
- * Club domestic league appearances and goals as of 30 May 2026 ‡ National team caps and goals as of 30 March 2021

Bence Balázs Bíró (born 14 July 1998) is a Hungarian football player who plays for Kisvárda.

== Career ==
=== Club career ===
He made his professional debut in the Segunda Liga for Vitória Guimarães B on 6 August 2016 in a game against Santa Clara.

On 30 June 2021, Bíró joined Pécs on loan.

On 29 June 2022, Bíró moved to Szeged-Csanád.

== Career statistics ==
As of 15 May 2021.

Appearances and goals by club, season and competition
Club	Season	League			Cup		Continental		Ogbf		Total	
Club	Season	Division	Apps	Goals	Apps	Goals	Apps	Goals	Apps	Goals	Apps	Goals
Vitória Guimarães B	2016–17	LigaPro	9	0	—		—		0	0	9	0
Vitória Guimarães B	2017–18	LigaPro	16	1	—		—		0	0	16	1
Vitória Guimarães B	2018–19	LigaPro	16	1	—		—		0	0	16	1
Vitória Guimarães B	2019–20	Campeonato de Portugal	9	0	—		—		0	0	9	0
Vitória Guimarães B	Total		50	2	0	0	0	0	0	0	50	2
MTK Budapest	2019–20	Nemzeti Bajnokság II	6	0	6	3	—		0	0	12	3
MTK Budapest	2020–21	Nemzeti Bajnokság I	16	0	4	1	—		0	0	20	1
MTK Budapest	Total		22	0	10	4	0	0	0	0	32	4
Career total			72	2	10	4	0	0	0	0	82	6
