= Martin Chlumecký =

Czech footballer (born 1997)

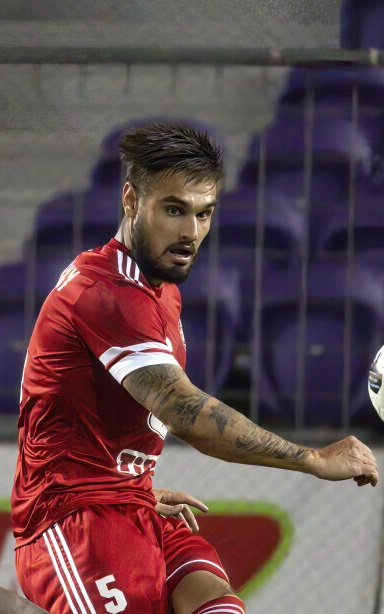
- Chlumecký playing for Kisvárda in 2025

Personal information
- Date of birth: 11 January 1997 (age 29)
- Place of birth: Prague, Czech Republic
- Height: 1.88 m (6 ft 2 in)
- Position: Defender

Team information
- Current team: Kisvárda
- Number: 5

Youth career
- 2014–2016: Slovan Liberec

Senior career*
Years	Team	Apps	(Gls)
2016–2018	Slovan Liberec	27	(1)
2017–2018	→ Varnsdorf (loan)	27	(1)
2018–2021	Dukla Prague	59	(2)
2019	→ Vysočina Jihlava (loan)	13	(0)
2021–2022	Teplice	3	(0)
2022–2023	Baník Ostrava	4	(0)
2022–2023	→ Pardubice (loan)	26	(1)
2023–2024	Podbeskidzie	16	(0)
2024	→ Pardubice (loan)	9	(0)
2024–	Kisvárda	52	(5)

International career
2014	Czech Republic U17	4	(0)
2014–2015	Czech Republic U18	6	(0)
2017–2018	Czech Republic U20	2	(0)
2017	Czech Republic U21	1	(0)
- * Club domestic league appearances and goals as of 30 May 2026

Martin Chlumecký (born 11 January 1997) is a Czech professional footballer who plays as a defender for Nemzeti Bajnokság I club Kisvárda.

Přítelkyně: Kateřina Vyšinská

== Career ==
He scored three own goals in his first five Czech First League matches for Dukla, scoring the only goal of Dukla's 1–0 home defeat to Bohemians 1905, followed by both opposition goals in the 2–1 home defeat against 1. FC Slovácko. He joined Vysočina Jihlava on a half-season loan during the winter break of the 2018–19 season.

On 8 September 2022, he was loaned to Pardubice in Czech First League.

On 30 June 2023, Chlumecký joined Polish second division side Podbeskidzie Bielsko-Biała on a two-year contract.

On 25 January 2024, Chlumecký joined Pardubice on a half-year loan deal without option. After returning from loan, he terminated his contract with Podbeskidzie by mutual consent on 16 July 2024.

== Honours ==
Kisvárda

- Nemzeti Bajnokság II: 2024–25
