= Dominik Soltész =

Hungarian association football player

Personal information
- Full name: Dominik István Soltész
- Date of birth: 29 November 2000 (age 25)
- Place of birth: Budapest, Hungary
- Height: 1.76 m (5 ft 9 in)
- Position: Attacking midfielder

Team information
- Current team: Kisvárda
- Number: 10

Youth career
- 2010–2019: Budapest Honvéd

Senior career*
Years	Team	Apps	(Gls)
2018–2022	Budapest Honvéd	0	(0)
2018–2022	→ Budapest Honvéd II	21	(3)
2019–2020	→ Ajka (loan)	45	(10)
2021–2022	→ Debrecen (loan)	18	(0)
2022	→ Debrecen II (loan)	3	(1)
2022–2024	Gyirmót	63	(19)
2024–	Kisvárda	46	(3)

International career^{‡}
2021	Hungary U-21	1	(0)
- * Club domestic league appearances and goals as of 30 May 2026 ‡ National team caps and goals as of 12 November 2021

Dominik Soltész (born 29 November 2000) is a Hungarian football midfielder who plays for Kisvárda.

== Career statistics ==
As of 15 May 2022

Appearances and goals by club, season and competition
Club	Season	League			Cup		Continental		Other		Total	
Club	Season	Division	Apps	Goals	Apps	Goals	Apps	Goals	Apps	Goals	Apps	Goals
Budapest Honvéd II	2017–18	Nemzeti Bajnokság III	2	0	—		—		—		2	0
Budapest Honvéd II	2018–19	Nemzeti Bajnokság III	19	3	—		—		—		19	3
Budapest Honvéd II	Total		21	3	0	0	0	0	0	0	21	3
Ajka	2019–20	Nemzeti Bajnokság II	21	3	2	0	—		—		23	3
Ajka	2020–21	Nemzeti Bajnokság II	24	7	1	0	—		—		25	7
Ajka	Total		45	10	3	0	0	0	0	0	48	10
Debrecen II	2021–22	Nemzeti Bajnokság I	3	1	0	0	—		—		3	1
Debrecen II	Total		3	1	0	0	0	0	0	0	3	1
Debrecen	2021–22	Nemzeti Bajnokság I	18	0	2	0	—		—		20	0
Debrecen	Total		18	0	2	0	0	0	0	0	20	0
Career total			87	14	5	0	0	0	0	0	92	14
