= Kisvárda FC =

Hungarian football club

Kisvárda
- Full name: Kisvárda Futball Club
- Founded: 1911; 115 years ago
- Ground: Várkerti Stadion
- Capacity: 2,750
- Chairman: Szabolcs Tóth
- Manager: Attila Révész (From 10 October 2025)
- League: NB I
- 2025–26: 8th of 16
- Website: kisvardafc.hu
Home colours	Away colours

Kisvárda Football Club [ˈkɪʃvaːrdɒ] is a Hungarian football club located in Kisvárda. It currently plays in Nemzeti Bajnokság I. The team's colors are red and white.

== History ==
Kisvárda FC, later known as Várda SE, was founded in 1911 as Kisvárdai Sport Egyesület (KSE). The officials of the village supported the new club by donating a pitch next to the market place. The financial support came from the merchants of the village, who helped a lot in the early stages of the club. In 1953, their present-day ground, the Várkerti sporttelep was built.

The club was reestablished on 26 October 1971.

=== 2010s ===
Since the 2013–14 season, the official name of the club is Kisvárda-Master Good FC.

In the 2017–18 Nemzeti Bajnokság II, Kisvárda finished second and were promoted to the 2018-19 Nemzeti Bajnokság I.

On 21 July 2018, the first Nemzeti Bajnokság I match was played against 2017-18 Nemzeti Bajnokság I title-holders Videoton FC at the Pancho Aréna. The match ended with a 4–0 defeat.

On 30 July 2018, Elemér Kondás was sacked after two consecutive defeats in the 2018-19 Nemzeti Bajnokság I season. The next coach was László Dajka, whom Kisvárda stayed in the NB I for the next (2019/2020) season.

The end of the season Dajka left the club and his position received Vasile Miriuță.

Kisvárda were eliminated by Ferencváros in the round of 16 of the 2018–19 Magyar Kupa season on 1–3 aggregate.

=== 2020s ===
On 6 February 2020, Tamás Bódog was appointed as the manager of the club. The club remained in the first division of the Hungarian League. However, he was sacked on 29 June 2020.

On 8 July 2020, Attila Supka, previously champions of the Nemzeti Bajnokság I with Debreceni VSC, was appointed as the manager of the club.

On 27 January 2021, Kisvárda beat Fehérvár FC for the first time in their history. The 2020-21 Nemzeti Bajnokság I match was won by 2–1. Originally, the match had to be played in autumn. However, it was postponed because Fehérvár played in the 2020-21 UEFA Europa League.

On 5 May 2022 Kisvarda beat Újpest FC at Várkerti Stadion 2-1 and with this result secured themselves qualification for the 2022-23 UEFA Europa Conference League at the second qualifying round.

On 20 July 2022, László Török and Kisvárda played their first international match in the 2022-23 UEFA Europa Conference League. They entered the second round of the tournament against FC Kairat. The first leg was won by 1-0 Kisvárda at the Almaty Central Stadium, Almaty, Kazakhstan. The only goal was scored by Jasir Asani in the 82nd minute. In the second leg, Kisvárda beat Kairat 1–0 at Várkerti Stadion on 28 July 2022. The only goal was scored by Jasmin Mešanović in the 39th minute.

On 12 August 2023, Miloš Kruščić was sacked after a draw against MTK Budapest FC at the Hidegkuti Nándor Stadion in the 2023–24 Nemzeti Bajnokság I season. Miloš Kruščić was replaced by Máté Gerliczki.

On 7 November 2023, János Mátyus resigned as the coach of the club. The club lost five matches and could win only one match with Mátyus in the 2023–24 season. On 8 November 2023, Tamás Feczkó was appointed as the coach of the club.

On 31 January 2024, the club announced the signing of Wellington Nem. Wellington made three appearances in the Brazil national football team.

Kisvárda entered the 3rd round of the 2023–24 Magyar Kupa season. On 17 September 2023, Kisvárda beat Pilisi LK 6–0 in the 3rd round of the Magyar Kupa. On 1 November 2023, Kisvárda beat Unione 6–0 in the 4th round of the Magyar Kupa. On 28 February 2024, Kisvárda beat Tiszakécske FC 3–0 in Tiszakécske in the round of 16 of the Magyar Kupa. On 2 April 2024, Kisvárda beat MTK Budapest FC 3–2 at the Várkerti Stadion in the quarter-finals of the Magyar Kupa.

In the 2023–24 Nemzeti Bajnokság I season was competing with Újpest FC to avoid relegation. Three rounds before the end, there were six points between the two teams. Tamás Feczkó said that the players need clear heads to be able to fight for avoiding the relegation. On 13 April 2024, Kisvárda beat Újpest at home. On 20 April 2024, Kisvárda drew with Ferencvárosi TC at the Ferencváros Stadion. Eight days later, on 28 April 2024, Kisvárda beat Fehérvár FC 1–0 at home.

In September 2024, Kisvárda signed Marko Matanović from FK Sarajevo. On 20 October 2024, Kisvárda beat Gyirmót FC Győr 6–4 at home.

On 6 August 2024, Tamás Feczkó resigned from his position. As an interim manager, Attila Révész trained the squad. In October he was appointed as the director for international relationships.

On 26 September 2024, 16-year-old Fedir Tkachenko was sold to La Liga club Real Betis.

On 4 May 2025, Kisvárda secured their promotion to the Nemzeti Bajnokság I after a 2–2 draw against Békéscsaba 1912 Előre at Kórház utcai Stadion in Békéscsaba. Attila Révész, the manager of the club, said after the match that at times one could enjoy watching the match.

On 21 May 2026, Attila Supka was appointed as the manager of the club a second time.

On 9 November 2026, Attila Kuttor was appointed as the manager of the club. On 21 November 2026, Kuttor debuted with a goalless draw against Újpest FC in the 2026–27 Nemzeti Bajnokság I season.

== Stadium ==
The old grounds, Várkert Sportpálya, were next to the market place, on Anarcsi út (Anarcsi road). It was able to host up to 1,000 supporters.
The current grounds, Várkert sporttelep, were established in 1953. The stadium is able to hold 2,000 people. The stadium's highest official attendance was 5,000, for a league match between Kisvárdai SE and Nyíregyházi VSSC on 1 April 1979.

The new stadium, Várkerti Stadion, was opened on 11 August 2018. The first match was played against Ferencváros in the 2018–19 Nemzeti Bajnokság I season. The match ended with a 2–0 victory for Ferencváros.

== Honours ==
- Nemzeti Bajnokság I
  - Runners-up (1): 2021–22
- Nemzeti Bajnokság II
  - Winners (1): 2024–25
  - Runners-up (1): 2017–18
- Nemzeti Bajnokság III
  - Winners (4): 1948–49, 2011–12, 2012–13, 2014–15

== Seasons ==
=== League positions ===
As of 13 July 2025

== European record ==
As of match played 11 August 2022

Season	Competition	Round	Club	Home	Away	Agg.
2022–23	UEFA Europa Conference League	2QR	(Kazakhstan) Kairat	1–0	1–0	2−0
2022–23	UEFA Europa Conference League	3QR	(Norway) Molde	2–1	0–3	2–4

Notes

- QR: Qualifying round

== Players ==
=== Current squad ===
As of 22 September 2026

Note: Flags indicate national team as defined under FIFA eligibility rules; some limited exceptions apply. Players may hold more than one non-FIFA nationality.

No.	Pos.	Nation	Player
1	GK	HUN	Marcell Kovács
4	DF	CZE	Martin Chlumecký
5	DF	HUN	Bálint Oláh
6	MF	UKR	Maksym Ostrovka
7	MF	AZE	Anatoliy Nuriyev
8	MF	HUN	István Soltész
10	MF	HUN	Dominik Soltész
11	MF	MNE	Marko Matanović
14	MF	UKR	Bohdan Melnyk
18	DF	HUN	Kevin Körmendi
22	MF	CAF	Amos Youga
23	GK	UKR	Illya Popovych
24	MF	SVK	Christián Herc
25	DF	BIH	Besim Šerbečić

No.	Pos.	Nation	Player
26	DF	SRB	Nikola Radmanovac
27	FW	BIH	Jasmin Mešanović (captain)
29	FW	HUN	Bence Bíró
32	GK	HUN	Zsombor Papp
37	DF	UKR	Myroslav Babyak
42	DF	HUN	Tibor Lippai
45	FW	NGR	Teslim Balogun
55	MF	HUN	Krisztián Nagy
70	MF	HUN	Levente Szőr
77	MF	HUN	Ákos Ésik
80	MF	FRA	Hianga'a Mbock
86	FW	HUN	Soma Novothny
98	FW	HUN	Máté Gyurkó
99	FW	BUL	Tonislav Yordanov

=== Out on loan ===
Note: Flags indicate national team as defined under FIFA eligibility rules; some limited exceptions apply. Players may hold more than one non-FIFA nationality.

No. / Pos. / Nation / Player	No. / Pos. / Nation / Player

== Managers ==
- (Hungary) (Romania) Vasile Miriuță (13 June 2019 – 8 October 2019)
- (Hungary) László Dajka (16 October 2019)
- (Hungary) Tamás Bódog (6 February 2020 – 29 June 2020)
- (Hungary) Attila Supka (8 July 2020 – 11 May 2021)
- (Portugal) João Janeiro (20 May 2021 – 10 November 2021)
- (Hungary) Gábor Erős (10 November 2021 – 28 June 2022)
- (Hungary) László Török (28 June 2022 – 27 March 2023)
- (Serbia) Miloš Kruščić (28 June 2022 – 12 August 2023)
- (Hungary) János Mátyus (3 September 2023 – 7 November 2023)
- (Hungary) Tamás Feczkó (8 November 2023 – 6 August 2024)
- (Hungary) Attila Révész (interim) (6 August 2024 – 31 May 2025)
- (Hungary) Máté Gerliczki (31 May 2025 – 30 September 2025)
- (Hungary) Attila Révész (1 October 2025–present)
- (Hungary) Attila Supka (21 May 2026-8 November 2026)
- (Hungary) Attila Kuttor (9 November-2026-present)

== See also ==
- MFA Mukachevo
