= 2026–27 Debreceni VSC season =

Debrecen
2026–27 season
- Owner: Stott Capital Hungary
- Chairman: (England) Mark Stott
- Manager: (Estonia) Gert Remmel (from 3 June 2026)
- Stadium: Nagyerdei Stadion
- Nemzeti Bajnokság I: 2nd
- Magyar Kupa: Round of 16
- UEFA Conference League: Third qualifying round
- Top goalscorer: League: Á. Szendrei (9 goals); All: Á. Szendrei (10 goals)
- Highest home attendance: 8,523; 1–0 v Pyunik Yerevan, (23 July 2026, Conf. League Qual., 2nd round)
- Lowest home attendance: 4,350; 2–2 v MTK, (28 August 2026, Nemzeti Bajnokság I, Round 6)
- Average home league attendance: 6,396
- Biggest win: 4 goals 6–2 v Nyíregyháza, (Away, 22 November 2026, Nemzeti Bajnokság I, Round 14)
- Biggest defeat: 4 goals 1–5 v Copenhagen, (Away, 12 August 2026, Conf. League Qual., 3rd round)
- All statistics correct as of 22 November 2026.

The 2026–27 season is Debreceni Vasutas Sport Club's 48th competitive season, 6th consecutive season in the Nemzeti Bajnokság I and 124th year in existence as a football club. In addition to the domestic league, Debrecen participates in Magyar Kupa and UEFA Conference League after finishing fourth place in Nemzeti Bajnokság I (domestic league) last season.

UEFA Conference League

DVSC started the UEFA Conference League qualification in second qualifying round, they faced 3rd placed team of Armenian Premier League Pyunik.

== Kits ==
Supplier: Adidas / Sponsor: Tranzit-Food / Tippmix / Short sponsor: Tippmix

Kits using Adidas's Three Stripes trademark
Home	Away	Third

Goalkeeper^{1}	Goalkeeper^{2}

== First team squad ==
As of 7 September 2026
Injured player

Note: Flags indicate national team as defined under FIFA eligibility rules; some limited exceptions apply. Players may hold more than one non-FIFA nationality.

No.	Pos.	Nation	Player
1	GK	BUL	Plamen Andreev
2	DF	HUN	Dénes Szakál
3	DF	ESP	Adrián Guerrero
4	DF	VEN	Josua Mejías
5	DF	HUN	Bence Batik (vice-captain)
6	MF	BIH	Blaž Bošković
8	FW	HUN	Leon Myrtaj
10	MF	HUN	Balázs Dzsudzsák (captain)
11	FW	HUN	Ákos Szendrei
12	GK	HUN	Bendek Erdélyi
15	MF	HUN	Dávid Patai
16	MF	ESP	Sergi Samper
18	MF	NGR	Kaye Shedrach
19	MF	HUN	Dominik Kocsis
20	MF	HUN	Máté Macsó
22	MF	HUN	Botond Vajda
23	DF	HUN	Gergő Tercza

No.	Pos.	Nation	Player
24	FW	HUN	Imre Egri
25	FW	FRA	Sohan Baldoni
26	DF	HUN	Ádám Lang
27	FW	HUN	Máté Kohut
28	DF	AUT	Maximilian Hofmann
29	DF	HUN	Erik Kusnyír
39	FW	MAD	Bryan Adinany (on loan from (Belgium) Kortrijk)
66	MF	GUI	Jocelyn Janneh
72	DF	ISR	Rotem Keller
75	MF	HUN	Dávid Patai
77	FW	HUN	Márk Szécsi
78	MF	HUN	Balázs Sain
89	GK	HUN	Dániel Póser
90	GK	HUN	Bálint Tuska
96	DF	FRA	Julien Dacosta
97	FW	HUN	Csanád Vilmos Dénes
99	MF	HUN	Flórián Cibla

=== Players with multiple nationalities ===
- (Hungary) (Ukraine) Erik Kusnyír

== Board of directors ==
As of 26 October 2026

Position	Name
President	(England) Mark Stott
Member of the board of directors	(England) Simon Wilson
Managing Director	(Sweden) Fredrik Söderberg
Secretary general	(Hungary) Balázs Makray
Sporting director	(Hungary) Ádám Bogdán

=== Management ===
As of 5 June 2026

Position	Name
Head coach	(Estonia) Gert Remmel
Assistant coach	(Finland) Rasmus Jansson
Assistant coach	(Portugal) Ednardo Monterio
Assistant coach	(Hungary) Tibor Dombi
Goalkeeping coach	(Hungary) János Balogh
Goalkeeping coach	(Hungary) János Tuska
Head fitness coach	(Hungary) Ádám Száraz
Fitness coach	(Hungary) Zsolt Pallai
Video analyzer	(Hungary) Dávid Szalóczy

== Transfers ==
=== Summer ===
In
Date	No.	Pos.	Nat.	Player	Moving from	Division	Ref.
27 May 2026	6	MF	Bosnia and Herzegovina	Blaž Bošković	Lokomotiva Zagreb	Croatian Football League	
30 May 2026	7	FW	Hungary	Leon Myrtaj	Tottenham Hotspur U18	U18 Premier League	
9 June 2026	20	MF	Hungary	Máté Macsó	Diósgyőr	Nemzeti Bajnokság II	
10 June 2026	72	DF	Israel	Rotem Keller	Maccabi Netanya	Israeli Premier League	
19 June 2026	1	GK	Bulgaria	Plamen Andreev	Feyenoord	Eredivisie (Dutch I)	
25 June 2026	90	GK	Hungary	Bálint Tuska	Diósgyőr	Nemzeti Bajnokság II	
25 June 2026	69	GK	Hungary	Dániel Póser	Békéscsaba	Nemzeti Bajnokság II	
26 June 2026	25	FW	France	Sohan Baldoni	US Concarneau	Championnat National (French Ligue 3)	
27 June 2026	16	MF	Spain	Sergi Samper	Motor Lublin	Ekstraklasa (Poland I)	
20 July 2026	11	FW	Hungary	Ákos Szendrei	Paks	Nemzeti Bajnokság I	
31 July 2026	97	FW	Hungary	Csanád Vilmos Dénes	Kortrijk	Belgian Pro League	
1 September 2026	66	MF	Guinea	Jocelyn Janneh	Bastia	Ligue 2 (French Ligue 2)	

On loan
Date	No.	Pos.	Nat.	Player	Moving from	Division	Until	Ref.
4 September 2026	39	FW	Madagascar	Bryan Adinany	Kortrijk	Belgian Pro League	30 June 2027	

Returned after loan expired
Date	No.	Pos.	Nat.	Player	Return to	Ref.
5 June 2026	42	FW	Ivory Coast	Yacouba Silue	OFK Beograd	
30 June 2026	11	FW	Hungary	György Komáromi	Maribor	
30 June 2026	14	MF	Serbia	Đorđe Gordić	Lommel	

Out
Date	No.	Pos.	Nat.	Player	Moving to	Division	Ref.
21 May 2026	20	MF	Central African Republic	Amos Youga	TBD	Contract expired	
4 June 2026	13	MF	Hungary	Soma Szuhodovszki	MTK	Nemzeti Bajnokság I	
11 June 2026	84	GK	Hungary	Márk Engedi	Vasas	Nemzeti Bajnokság I	
12 June 2026	1	GK	Hungary	Patrik Demjén	MTK	Nemzeti Bajnokság I	
16 June 2026	8	MF	Hungary	Tamás Szűcs	Famalicão	Portugal I	
8 July 2026	16	MF	Spain	Fran Manzanara	AD Alcorcón	Spanish III	
11 July 2026	95	MF	Spain	Álex Bermejo	Sant Andreu	Spanish III	
15 July 2026	17	FW	Hungary	Donát Bárány	ADO Den Haag	Eredivisie (Dutch I)	

Out on loan
Date	No.	Pos.	Nat.	Player	Moving to	Division	Until	Ref.
7 September 2026	49	DF	Ukraine	Vyacheslav Kulbachuk	Kryvbas Kryvyi Rih	Ukrainian Premier League	30 June 2027	

=== New contracts ===
Date	No.	Pos.	Nat.	Player	Moving from	Until	Ref.
17 September 2026	TBD	FW	Hungary	Bertold Lovas	DVSC Academy	N/A	
17 September 2026	TBD	FW	Hungary	Kornél Zsuppán	DVSC Academy	N/A	

=== Contract renewals ===
Date	No.	Pos.	Nat.	Player	Extension to	Ref.
4 June 2026	77	FW	Hungary	Márk Szécsi (vice-captain)	30 June 2027	
22 June 2026	28	DF	Austria	Maximilian Hofmann	30 June 2027	
24 June 2026	10	MF	Hungary	Balázs Dzsudzsák (captain)	30 June 2027	
16 November 2026	78	MF	Hungary	Balázs Sain	30 June 2029	

=== Managerial changes ===
Outgoing manager	Manner of departure	Date of vacancy	Position in table	Incoming manager	Date of appointment	Ref.
Sergio Navarro	Mutual agreement	16 May 2026	Pre-season	(Estonia) Gert Remmel	3 June 2026	

== Friendlies ==
Win Draw Loss Fixtures

=== Pre-season ===
Debrecen began the preparation for the 2026/27 season at 17 June 2026.

Summer training camp in Bad Loipersdorf, Austria, from 28 June until 10 July 2026.

4 July 2026 Friendly	Austria Vienna (Austrian I)	1–1	Debrecen	Kirchschlag in der Buckligen Welt, Austria
15:00 CEST	Eggestein 38' (pen.)	Report	Baldoni 22'	Stadium: Weststadion Kirchschlag
Note: • Debrecen: Andreeyev (Erdélyi (substituted on) 63') — Kusnyír (Tercza (substituted on) 46'), Lang (Mejías (substituted on) 46'), Hofmann (Dacosta (substituted on) 46'), Keller (Guerrero (substituted on) 46') — Samper (Patai (substituted on) 46') — D. Kocsis (M. Szécsi (substituted on) 46'), Dzsudzsák (Sain (substituted on) 46'), Boskovic (Cibla (substituted on) 46'), Macsó (Egri (substituted on) 46') — Baldoni (Kohut (substituted on) 46') • Manager: Remmel

9 July 2026 Friendly	Železničar Pančevo (Serbia) (Serbian I)	3–1	Debrecen	Murska Sobota, Slovenia
17:30 CEST	Simao 29'; Jevremović 39'; Sumaila 56'		Baldoni 43'
Note: • Debrecen: Andreeyev — Kusnyír, Lang, Hofmann, Keller — Samper — D. Kocsis, Dzsudzsák, Boskovic, Macsó — Baldoni • Substitutions: Cibla, Kohut, Myrtaj, Sain, Dacosta, Szakál, Guerrero • Manager: Remmel

10 July 2026 Friendly	Slaven Belupo (Croatia) (Croatian I)	0–1	Debrecen	Kräuterdorf Söchau, Austria
11:30 CEST		Report	Egri 51'	Stadium: TBD
Note: • Debrecen: Erdélyi — Tercza, Mejías, Batik, Guerrero — Patai — M. Szécsi, Myrtaj, Sain, Egri — Kohut • Substitutions: Tuska, Szakál, T. Vincze, Vidnyánszky, Serucza, Bah • Manager: Remmel

Source of fixtures: Soccerway.

== Competitions ==
=== Overall record ===
In italics, we indicate the Last match and the Final position achieved in competition(s) that have not yet been completed.

Competition	First match	Last match	Starting round	Final position	Record							
Competition	First match	Last match	Starting round	Final position	Pld	W	D	L	GF	GA	GD	Win %
Nemzeti Bajnokság I	26 July 2026	22 November 2026	Matchday 1	2nd	14	7	4	3	30	20	+10	50.00
Magyar Kupa	12 September 2026	28 October 2026	Round of 64	Round of 16	2	2	0	0	6	4	+2	100.00
UEFA Conference League	23 July 2026	12 August 2026	Second qualifying round	Third qualifying round	4	1	1	2	2	8	−6	25.00
Total					20	10	5	5	38	32	+6	50.00

Last updated: 22 November 2026
Source: Soccerway

=== Nemzeti Bajnokság I ===
==== League table ====
Pos	Team	Pld	W	D	L	GF	GA	GD	Pts	Qualification or relegation
1	ETO Győr	14	7	5	2	25	16	+9	26	Qualification for the Champions League second qualifying round
2	Debrecen	14	7	4	3	30	20	+10	25	Qualification for the Conference League second qualifying round
3	Puskás Akadémia	14	8	0	6	19	17	+2	24	Qualification for the Conference League second qualifying round
4	Ferencváros	13	6	5	2	23	13	+10	23	
5	Paks	13	6	2	5	24	22	+2	20	

Updated to match(es) played on 22 November 2026, Round 14 (5 and 6 matches). Source: Hungarian Football Federation (in Hungarian)
Rules for classification: 1) Points; 2) Matches won; 3) Goal difference; 4) Goals scored (GF); 5) Head-to-head points; 6) Head-to-head goal difference; 7) Fair play ranking; 8) Drawing of lots.

==== Results summary ====
Overall								Home						Away					
Pld	W	D	L	GF	GA	GD	Pts	W	D	L	GF	GA	GD	W	D	L	GF	GA	GD
14	7	4	3	30	20	+10	25	3	2	2	12	10	+2	4	2	1	18	10	+8

Last updated: 22 November 2026.
Source: Soccerway

==== Results by round ====
A = Away; H = Home; W = Win; D = Draw; L = Loss; P = Postponed

Round	1	2	3	4	5	6	7	8	9	10	11	12	13	14	15	16	17	18	19	20	21	22	23	24	25	26	27	28	29	30	31	32	33
Ground	H	A	H	H	A	H	A	H	A	H	A	A	H	A	A	H	A	H	A	H	A	H	H	A	H	H	A	H	A	H	A	H	A
Result	L	L	W	D	D	D	W	L	D	W	W	W	W	W																			
Position	11	12	9	10	10	11	8	9	8	7	5	4	4	2																			
Points	0	0	3	4	5	6	9	9	10	13	16	19	22	25																			
Manager	R	R	R	R	R	R	R	R	R	R	R	R	R	R																			

Updated to match(es) played on 22 November 2026. Source:
Notes:
Manager: • R Remmel

==== Matches ====
Win Draw Loss Fixtures Postponed

The draw for the 2026/27 season was held on 22 June 2026.

26 July 2026 1	Debrecen	0–2	Puskás Akadémia	Debrecen
18:00 CEST	Patai (yellow card) 45'; Mejías (yellow card) 63'	Report	A. Németh 11', 29'; Kern (yellow card) 31'; Golla (yellow card) 73'; Colley (yellow card) 71' (yellow-red card) 90+3'	Stadium: Nagyerdei Stadion; Attendance: 5,314; Referee: Balázs Berke; Assistant referees: Bence Belicza, Ákos Berényi
Note: • Debrecen: Andreeyev — Tercza, Mejías, Batik, Keller (Guerrero (substituted on) 80') — Bošković (Sain (substituted on) 75'), Patai — D. Kocsis, Dzsudzsák (c) (Myrtaj (substituted on) 46'), Macsó (Cibla (substituted on) 46') — Á. Szendrei (Baldoni (substituted on) 58') • Manager: Remmel • Player of the match: András Németh, Puskás Akadémia 8.4 • Best player of Debrecen: Josua Mejías 7.6

2 August 2026 2	Újpest	4–2	Debrecen	Budapest
15:30 CEST	Amenyido 24'; K. Horváth 45+1', 61'; Mi. Mucsányi (yellow card) 90+2'; Matko 90+5'	Report	Á. Szendrei 11'; Mejías (yellow card) 31'; Patai (yellow card) 49'; Cibla (yellow card) 68'; Bošković (yellow card) 83'; Dzsudzsák 89' (yellow card) 90+6'	Stadium: Szusza Ferenc Stadion; Attendance: 4,223; Referee: Gergő Bogár; Assistant referees: Vencel Tóth II, István Albert
Note: • Debrecen: Erdélyi — Tercza (Kusnyír (substituted on) 54'), Mejías, Lang (c), Keller (Guerrero (substituted on) 46') — Patai — D. Kocsis (M. Szécsi (substituted on) 75'), Sain (Dzsudzsák (substituted on) 54'), Bošković, Cibla — Á. Szendrei (Baldoni (substituted on) 70') • Manager: Remmel • Player of the match: Krisztofer Horváth, Újpest 9.4 • Best player of Debrecen: Ákos Szendrei 8.1

9 August 2026 3	Debrecen	1–0	Nyíregyháza	Debrecen
17:30 CEST	Mejías (yellow card) 42'; Dzsudzsák 55'; Batik (yellow card) es62' (red card) (after match) (Note: At the meeting of the MLSZ Disciplinary Committee on August 19, 2026, Bence Batik was given a three-match suspension, despite the fact that he only received a yellow card warning in the match.); V. Dénes (yellow card) 77'	Report	Žiković (yellow card) 48'; Temesvári (yellow card) 62' (yellow-red card) 90+2'	Stadium: Nagyerdei Stadion; Attendance: 7,621; Referee: Márton Rúsz; Assistant referees: Balázs Buzás, Ákos Berényi
Note: • Debrecen: Andreeyev — M. Szécsi (Keller (substituted on) 83'), Mejías, Lang, Guerrero — Sain (Patai (substituted on) 58'), Batik — V. Dénes (Vajda (substituted on) 83'), Dzsudzsák (c), Cibla (Kaye (substituted on) 71') — Á. Szendrei (Baldoni (substituted on) 71') • Manager: Remmel • Player of the match: Bence Batik, Debrecen 8.1 • Best player of Nyíregyháza: Balázs Tóth 7.3

16 August 2026 4	Debrecen	1–1	ETO Győr	Debrecen
16:30 CEST	Guerrero 50'; Bošković (yellow card) 54'; Dzsudzsák (yellow card) 54'; Mejías (yellow card) 83'	Report	Gavrić 41'; Krpić (yellow card) 62'; Ba. Bíró (yellow card) 90+3'	Stadium: Nagyerdei Stadion; Attendance: 5,074; Referee: Balázs Berke; Assistant referees: Gergő Vígh-Tarsonyi, Bence Belicza
Note: • Debrecen: Andreeyev — Mejías, Batik, Lang, Guerrero — Bošković (Tercza (substituted on) 70'), Sain (Patai (substituted on) 46') — V. Dénes, Dzsudzsák (c), Cibla (Vajda (substituted on) 79') — Á. Szendrei (Kaye (substituted on) 79') • Manager: Remmel • Player of the match: Željko Gavrić, ETO Győr 8.3 • Best player of Debrecen: Balázs Dzsudzsák 8.0

23 August 2026 5	Kisvárda	0–0	Debrecen	Kisvárda
17:30 CEST	Matanović (yellow card) 7'; Szikszai (yellow card) 63' (yellow-red card) 74'; Nuriyev (yellow card) 78'	Report	Lang (red card) 82'	Stadium: Várkerti Stadion; Attendance: 2,245; Referee: Márió Zimmermann; Assistant referees: Gergely Becséri, Dávid Rózsa
Note: • Debrecen: Andreeyev — Tercza (Dacosta (substituted on) 63'), Mejías, Lang, Guerrero — Bošković, Patai — V. Dénes, Dzsudzsák (c), Cibla (Kaye (substituted on) 75') — Á. Szendrei (Vajda (substituted on) 84') • Manager: Remmel • Player of the match: Nikola Radmanovac, Kisvárda 7.6 • Best player of Debrecen: Plamen Andreev 7.5

28 August 2026 6	Debrecen	2–2	MTK	Debrecen
20:00 CEST	Mejías (yellow card) 20'; V. Dénes 30' (yellow card) 39'; Dzsudzsák 47' (yellow card) 79'	Report	Jurek 19' (pen.), 34'; Hinora (yellow card) 20'; Kata (yellow card) 39'; Zubor (yellow card) 85'	Stadium: Nagyerdei Stadion; Attendance: 4,350; Referee: Tamás Bognár; Assistant referees: Dániel Szalai, Dávid Rózsa
Note: • Debrecen: Andreeyev — Tercza (Keller (substituted on) 80'), Szakál, Mejías, Guerrero — Patai (Myrtaj (substituted on) 76'), Bošković — V. Dénes, Dzsudzsák (c), Cibla — Á. Szendrei (Kaye (substituted on) 72') • Manager: Remmel • Player of the match: Gábor Jurek, MTK 8.3 • Best player of Debrecen: Balázs Dzsudzsák 8.3

5 September 2026 7	Paks	2–4	Debrecen	Paks
20:00 CEST	Haraszti 24'; B. Tóth 81'; J. Szabó (yellow card) 88'	Report	Á. Szendrei 6', 21'; Guerrero 38'; Vas 72' (o.g.); V. Dénes (yellow card) 89'	Stadium: Fehérvári úti Stadion; Attendance: 2,781; Referee: Mihály Káprály; Assistant referees: István Szécsényi, Gergely Becséri
Note: • Debrecen: Andreeyev (Erdélyi (substituted on) 76') — Tercza, Szakál, Lang, Guerrero — Patai (Samper (substituted on) 68'), Bošković — Egri (Baldoni (substituted on) 68'), Dzsudzsák (c) (Sain (substituted on) 54'), V. Dénes — Á. Szendrei (Adinany (substituted on) 68') • Manager: Remmel • Player of the match: Adrián Guerrero, Debrecen 8.0 • Best player of Paks: Zsolt Haraszti 8.0

19 September 2026 8	Debrecen	2–4	Vasas	Debrecen
19:30 CEST	Á. Szendrei 5'; Batik 10' (yellow card) 58'; Lang (yellow card) 73'; Szakál (yellow card) 90+5'; Tercza (yellow card) 90+6'	Report	Csóka (yellow card) 21'; Koszta 45'; Hidi (yellow card) 45+2'; Pávkovics 61' (yellow card) 80'; Kovácsréti (yellow card) 69'; Pethő 90+1'; M. Tóth (yellow card) 90+7' (goal) 90+8'	Stadium: Nagyerdei Stadion; Attendance: 6,694; Referee: Marcell Derdák; Assistant referees: Balázs Buzás, István Széchenyi
Note: • Debrecen: Andreeyev — Tercza, Batik, Lang, Guerrero (Keller (substituted on) 90+3') — Bošković, Patai — Egri (Baldoni (substituted on) 61'), Dzsudzsák (c), V. Dénes — Á. Szendrei (Adinany (substituted on) 61') • Manager: Remmel • Player of the match: Milán Tóth, Vasas 8.2 • Best player of Debrecen: Balázs Dzsudzsák 7.5

10 October 2026 9	Ferencváros	1–1	Debrecen	Budapest
17:00 CEST	Yusuf (yellow card) 5'; Corbu 65'; Gómez (yellow card) 89'	Report	Meíjas (yellow card) 25'; D. Kocsis (yellow card) 77'; Dzsudzsák 90+5' (pen.)	Stadium: Groupama Aréna; Attendance: 11,593; Referee: Balázs Berke; Assistant referees: Georgiou Theodoros, Péter Ország
Note: • Debrecen: Andreeyev — Tercza (Hoffman (substituted on) 56'), Meíjas, Lang, Guerrero — Batik — Baldoni (D. Kocsis (substituted on) 70'), Dzsudzsák (c), Bošković, V. Dénes — Á. Szendrei (Adinany (substituted on) 62') • Manager: Remmel • Player of the match: Marius Corbu, Ferencváros 8.3 • Best player of Debrecen: Blaž Bošković 7.3

18 October 2026 10	Debrecen	3–0	Zalaegerszeg	Debrecen
15:30 CEST	Á. Szendrei 43'; Guerrero (yellow card) 45+2'; Dacosta (yellow card) 81'; Bošković (yellow card) 89'; Baldoni 62', 90+4'	Report	Da Silva (yellow card) 56'; B. Kiss (yellow card) 71'	Stadium: Nagyerdei Stadion; Attendance: 6,019; Referee: Péter Antal; Assistant referees: Norbert Bornemissza, Bence Belicza
Note: • Debrecen: Andreeyev — Meíjas (Dacosta (substituted on) 78'), Hoffman (Samper (substituted on) 72'), Lang, Guerrero — Egri (Baldoni (substituted on) 61'), Dzsudzsák (c) (Cibla (substituted on) 72'), Batik, Bošković, V. Dénes (D. Kocsis (substituted on) 61') – Á. Szendrei • Manager: Remmel • Player of the match: Ákos Szendrei, Debrecen 8.8 • Best player of Zalaegerszeg: András Csonka 7.4

24 October 2026 11	Kispest-Honvéd	0–2	Debrecen	Budapest
14:30 CEST	Marí (yellow card) 88'	Report	Guerrero (yellow card) 6'; Andreeyev (yellow card) 8'; Bošković 54'; Baldoni (yellow card) 84'; V. Dénes 87'; Meíjas (yellow card) 90+3'	Stadium: Bozsik Aréna; Attendance: 3,992; Referee: Imre Kovács; Assistant referees: József Aradi, Szabin Topálszki
Note: • Debrecen: Andreeyev — Meíjas, Lang, Hoffman (Patai (substituted on) 86'), Guerrero — Samper (Batik (substituted on) 59'), Bošković (Cibla (substituted on) 77') — D. Kocsis (Baldoni (substituted on) 59'), Dzsudzsák (c), Egri (V. Dénes (substituted on) 46') — Á. Szendrei • Manager: Remmel • Player of the match: Blaž Bošković, Debrecen 7.6 • Best player of Kispest-Honvéd: Alex Szabó and Patrik Pinte 7.0 each

1 November 2026 12	Puskás Akadémia	1–3	Debrecen	Felcsút
13:30 CET	A. Németh 38'; Duarte (yellow card) 44'; Ormonde-Ottewill (yellow card) 56' (yellow-red card) 74'; Okeke (yellow card) 84'	Report	Bošković 7'; Hoffman (yellow card) 38'; Bošković (yellow card) 43'; Meíjas (yellow card) 64'; D. Kocsis (yellow card) 67'; Batik 85'; Patai (yellow card) 90'; Baldoni 90+1'	Stadium: Pancho Aréna; Attendance: 1,400; Referee: Bence Csonka dr. Assistant referees: Vencel Tóth II, Péter Ország
Note: • Debrecen: Andreeyev — Meíjas, Lang (Batik (substituted on) 40'), Hoffman, Guerrero — Samper (Baldoni (substituted on) 59'), Bošković — Egri (Patai (substituted on) 59'), Dzsudzsák (c) (Cibla (substituted on) 86'), V. Dénes (D. Kocsis (substituted on) 59') — Á. Szendrei • Manager: Remmel • Player of the match: Balázs Dzsudzsák, Debrecen 8.4 • Best player of Puskás Akadémia: Bendegúz Lehoczki 7.5

8 November 2026 13	Debrecen	3–1	Újpest	Debrecen
15:30 CET	Á. Szendrei 39'; Patai (yellow card) 45+12'; V. Dénes 49'; Bošković (yellow card) 65'; Cibla 86'	Report	Matko 42'; Krajcsovics (yellow card) 45+1'; Zeke (yellow card) 45+13'; Ljujić (yellow card) 54'; Scharmer (yellow card) 82'	Stadium: Nagyerdei Stadion; Attendance: 7,854; Referee: Márton Rúsz; Assistant referees: Norbert Bornemissza, Viktor Nagy
Note: • Debrecen: Andreeyev — Meíjas (Tercza (substituted on) 89'), Hoffman, Batik, Guerrero — Patai (Samper (substituted on) 59'), Bošković — D. Kocsis (Baldoni (substituted on) 59'), Dzsudzsák (c) (Cibla (substituted on) 74'), V. Dénes (Egri (substituted on) 74') — Á. Szendrei • Manager: Remmel • Player of the match: Vilmos Dénes, Debrecen 8.8 • Best player of Újpest: Aljoša Matko 7.3

22 November 2026 14	Nyíregyháza	2–6	Debrecen	Nyíregyháza
16:00 CET	M. Kovács (yellow card) 3'; Hoffman 54' (o.g.); Hős (yellow card) 83'; Batoum 87' (yellow card) 88'	Report	Á. Szendrei 30', 57', 81'; Meíjas (yellow card) 39'; D. Kocsis 42', 78'; Hoffman (yellow card) 58'; Lang (yellow card) 73'; Sain (yellow card) 83'; Baldoni 90+2'	Stadium: Városi Stadion; Attendance: 6,435; Referee: Balázs Berke; Assistant referees: István Albert, Bence Belicza
Note: • Debrecen: Andreeyev — Meíjas (Tercza (substituted on) 85'), Hoffman, Lang, Guerrero — Patai, Cibla (Batik (substituted on) 58') — D. Kocsis (Egri (substituted on) 79'), Dzsudzsák (c) (Sain (substituted on) 79'), V. Dénes (Baldoni (substituted on) 58') — Á. Szendrei • Manager: Remmel • Player of the match: Ákos Szendrei, Debrecen 9.8 • Best player of Nyíregyháza: Zsombor Hős 8.0

27 November 2026 15	ETO Győr	v	Debrecen	Győr
19:30 CET				Stadium: ETO Park

5 December 2026 16	Debrecen	v	Kisvárda	Debrecen
14:30 CET				Stadium: Nagyerdei Stadion

13 December 2026 17	MTK	v	Debrecen	Budapest
15:45 CET				Stadium: Hidegkuti Nándor Stadion

19 December 2026 18	Debrecen	v	Paks	Debrecen
16:00 CET				Stadium: Nagyerdei Stadion

30 January 2027 19	Vasas	v	Debrecen	Budapest
TBD				Stadium: Illovszky Rudolf Stadion

6 February 2026 20	Debrecen	v	Ferencváros	Debrecen
TBD				Stadium: Nagyerdei Stadion

13 February 2027 21	Zalaegerszeg	v	Debrecen	Zalaegerszeg
TBD				Stadium: ZTE Arena

20 February 2027 22	Debrecen	v	Kispest-Honvéd	Debrecen
TBD				Stadium: Nagyerdei Stadion

27 February 2027 23	Debrecen	v	Puskás Akadémia	Debrecen
TBD				Stadium: Nagyerdei Stadion

6 March 2027 24	Újpest	v	Debrecen	Budapest
TBD				Stadium: Szusza Ferenc Stadion

13 March 2027 25	Debrecen	v	Nyíregyháza	Debrecen
TBD				Stadium: Nagyerdei Stadion

20 March 2027 26	Debrecen	v	ETO Győr	Debrecen
TBD				Stadium: Nagyerdei Stadion

3 April 2027 27	Kisvárda	v	Debrecen	Kisvárda
TBD				Stadium: Várkerti Stadion

10 April 2027 28	Debrecen	v	MTK	Debrecen
TBD				Stadium: Nagyerdei Stadion

17 April 2027 29	Paks	v	Debrecen	Paks
TBD				Stadium: Fehérvári úti Stadion

24 April 2027 30	Debrecen	v	Vasas	Debrecen
TBD				Stadium: Nagyerdei Stadion

1 May 2027 31	Ferencváros	v	Debrecen	Budapest
TBD				Stadium: Groupama Aréna

15 May 2027 32	Debrecen	v	Zalaegerszeg	Debrecen
TBD				Stadium: Nagyerdei Stadion

22 May 2027 33	Kispest-Honvéd	v	Debrecen	Budapest
TBD				Stadium: Bozsik Aréna

Source: MLSZ Adatbank

=== Magyar Kupa ===
Win Draw Loss Fixtures Postponed

==== Round of 64 ====
In the first round, Gödöllő won 3–0 away against fourth-division Cegléd. In the second round Gödöllő again won, they defeated fourth-division Szabadkikötő 2–0 away.

12 September 2026 R64	Gödöllő (NB III)	2–3	Debrecen	Gödöllő
15:00 CEST	Mertse 55'; K. Balog 68' (yellow card) 90+5'; Z. Nagy (yellow card) 87'	Report	Egri 19'; V. Dénes (yellow card) 24'; Tercza 36'; Batik (yellow card) 54'; Á. Szendrei 90'; Myrtaj (yellow card) 90+3'	Stadium: Szűcs Lajos Sportcentrum; Attendance: 900; Referee: Tamás Ujhelyi; Assistant referees: Balázs Szert, Levente Balla
Note: • Debrecen: Erdélyi — Tercza, Szakál, Batik, Keller — Patai (Samper (substituted on) 59'), Bošković (Janneh (substituted on) 46') — Egri, Myrtaj, V. Dénes (Baldoni (substituted on) 46') — Adinany (Á. Szendrei (substituted on) 69') • Manager: Remmel • Player of the match: Krisztofer Horváth, Újpest 9.4 • Best player of Debrecen: Ákos Szendrei 8.1

==== Round of 32 ====
28 October 2026 R32	Csepel (NB III)	2–3	Debrecen	Csepel (Budapest)
12:30 CET	L. Tóth 37' (yellow card) 62'; Torda 83' (yellow card) 84'	Report	V. Dénes 42'; Egri 90+2'; Batik (yellow card) 90+2'; D. Kocsis 90+3'	Stadium: Béke téri Stadion; Attendance: 1,500; Referee: Péter Zierkelbach; Assistant referees: Georgiou Theodoros, Zoltán Horváth
Note: • Debrecen: Erdélyi — Dacosta (Mejías (substituted on) 66'), Batik (c), Szakál, Keller — Janneh (Samper (substituted on) 76'), Patai — Baldoni (Egri (substituted on) 61'), Cibla, V. Dénes (Á. Szendrei (substituted on) 61') — Adinany (D. Kocsis (substituted on) 61') • Manager: Remmel

==== Round of 16 ====
10 February 2027 R16	Ajka (NB II)	v	Debrecen	Ajka
17:00 CET				Stadium: Városi Sportcentrum

=== UEFA Conference League ===
Win Draw Loss Fixtures Postponed

==== Second qualifying round ====
The draw for the second qualifying round was held on 17 June 2026.

23 July 2026 1st leg	Debrecen (Hungarian Football Federation)	1–0	(Football Federation of Armenia) Pyunik	Debrecen, Hungary
18:00 CEST	Cibla 59'; Bošković (yellow card) 90+4'	Report	James Santos (yellow card) 33'; Witi (yellow card) 82'	Stadium: Nagyerdei Stadion; Attendance: 8,523; Referee: Jacob Karlsen (Denmark); Assistant referees: Martin Markus, Jakob Mastrup
Note: • Debrecen: Andreeyev — Tercza (M. Szécsi (substituted on) 80'), Hofmann, Lang, Guerrero (Keller (substituted on) 80') — Samper, Bošković — D. Kocsis, Dzsudzsák (c) (Sain (substituted on) 80'), Cibla (Macsó (substituted on) 73') — Baldoni (Á. Szendrei (substituted on) 64') • Manager: Remmel • Player of the match: Flórián Cibla, Debrecen 7.8 • Best player of Pyunik: Serhiy Vakulenko 7.3

30 July 2026 2nd leg	Pyunik (Football Federation of Armenia)	0–0 (0–1 agg.)	(Hungarian Football Federation) Debrecen	Yerevan, Azerbaijan
18:00 (20:00 UTC+4)	Witi (yellow card) 69'	Report	Lang (yellow card) 65'; Á. Szendrei (yellow card) 90+5'	Stadium: Vazgen Sargsyan Republican Stadium; Attendance: 3,895; Referee: Igor Stojchevski (North Macedonia); Assistant referees: Filip Ickovski, Darko Jovcevski
Note: • Debrecen: Andreeyev — Kusnyír, Mejías (Sain (substituted on) 84'), Lang, Guerrero — Patai (Batik (substituted on) 56'), Bošković — D. Kocsis, Dzsudzsák (c), Cibla (M. Szécsi (substituted on) 69') — Baldoni (Á. Szendrei (substituted on) 68') • Manager: Remmel • Player of the match: Henri Avagyan, Pyunik 8.1 • Best player of Debrecen: Erik Kusnyír 7.1

Debrecen won 1–0 on aggregate.

==== Third qualifying round ====
6 August 2026 1st leg	Debrecen (Hungarian Football Federation)	0–3	(Danish Football Association) Copenhagen	Debrecen, Hungary
19:00 CEST	Baldoni (yellow card) 15'; Bošković (yellow card) 36'	Report	Pereira 21'; Robert 35'; Clem (yellow card) 80'; Cornelius 90+1'	Stadium: Nagyerdei Stadion; Attendance: 6,120; Referee: Enea Jorgji (Albania); Assistant referees: Denis Rexha, Xhulio Mani
Note: • Debrecen: Andreeyev — M. Szécsi, Lang, Mejías, Keller — Batik, Bošković (Sain (substituted on) 46') — Dénes (Vajda (substituted on) 65'), Dzsudzsák (c), Cibla (Kaye (substituted on) 65') — Baldoni (Á. Szendrei (substituted on) 85') • Manager: Remmel • Player of the match: Pereira, Copenhagen 8.2 • Best player of Debrecen: Flórián Cibla 7.3

12 August 2026 2nd leg	Copenhagen (Danish Football Association)	5–1 (8–1 agg.)	(Hungarian Football Federation) Debrecen	Copenhagen, Denmark
18:00 CEST	Elyounoussi 3', 58' (pen.); Ndjee (yellow card) 67'; Král 76'; Cornelius 78', 90+1'	Report	Dzsudzsák 48'; Myrtaj (yellow card) 57'; Kaye (yellow card) 61'	Stadium: Parken Stadium; Attendance: 19,235; Referee: Jérémie Pignard (France); Assistant referees: Aurélien Drouet, Thomas Luczynski
Note: • Debrecen: Erdélyi — Myrtaj, Batik (c), Mejías (Lang (substituted on) 46'), Keller (Guerrero (substituted on) 46') — Sain, Patai — Dénes (Vajda (substituted on) 66'), Kaye, Cibla (Dzsudzsák (substituted on) 46') — Baldoni (Á. Szendrei (substituted on) 86') • Manager: Remmel • Player of the match: Andreas Cornelius, Copenhagen 8.9 • Best player of Debrecen: Balázs Dzsudzsák 7.1

Copenhagen won 8–1 on aggregate.

== Statistics ==
As of match played 22 November 2026

=== Goal scorers ===
Includes all competitions for senior teams. The list is sorted by squad number when season-total goals are equal. Players with no goals not included in the list.
We indicate in parentheses how many of the goals scored by the player from penalties.

Rank	No.	Pos.	Player	Nemzeti Bajnokság I (Domestic league)	Magyar Kupa (Domestic cup)	UEFA Conference League	Season total	Ref.
1	11	FW	(Hungary) Ákos Szendrei	9	1	0	10	
2	10	MF	(Hungary) Balázs Dzsudzsák	4 (1)	0	1	5 (1)	
3	25	FW	(France) Sohan Baldoni	4	0	0	4	
3	97	FW	(Hungary) Csanád Vilmos Dénes	3	1	0	4	
5	19	MF	(Hungary) Dominik Kocsis	2	1	0	3	
6	3	DF	(Spain) Adrián Guerrero	2	0	0	2	
6	5	DF	(Hungary) Bence Batik	2	0	0	2	
6	6	MF	(Bosnia and Herzegovina) Blaž Bošković	2	0	0	2	
6	24	FW	(Hungary) Imre Egri	0	2	0	2	
6	99	MF	(Hungary) Flórián Cibla	1	0	1	2	
11	23	DF	(Hungary) Gergő Tercza	0	1	0	1	
Own goals				1	0	0	1	
Total				30 (1)	6	2 (0)	38 (1)	

=== Hat-tricks ===
(H) = Home; (A) = Away;

Date	Player	Opponent	Result	Score	Round
22 November 2026	(Hungary) Ákos Szendrei	Nyíregyháza (A)	6–2	30' 1–0, 57' 3–1, 81' 5–1	14

=== Penalties ===
Date	Penalty Taker	Scored	Opponent	Competition
10 October 2026	(Hungary) Balázs Dzsudzsák	Yes	(Hungarian Football Federation) Ferencváros (A)	Nemzeti Bajnokság I, Round 9

Note: (H) – Home; (A) – Away

=== Assists ===
Includes all competitions for senior teams. The list is sorted by squad number when season-total assists are equal. Players with no assists not included in the list.

Rank	No.	Pos.	Player	Nemzeti Bajnokság I (Domestic league)	Magyar Kupa (Domestic cup)	UEFA Conference League	Season total	Ref.
1	24	FW	(Hungary) Imre Egri	5	0	0	5	
2	97	FW	(Hungary) Csanád Vilmos Dénes	4	0	0	4	
3	6	MF	(Bosnia and Herzegovina) Blaž Bošković	2	1	0	3	
4	10	MF	(Hungary) Balázs Dzsudzsák	2	0	0	2	
4	11	FW	(Hungary) Ákos Szendrei	2	0	0	2	
4	19	MF	(Hungary) Dominik Kocsis	2	0	0	2	
7	3	DF	(Spain) Adrián Guerrero	1	0	0	1	
7	4	DF	(Venezuela) Josua Mejías	1	0	0	1	
7	8	FW	(Hungary) Leon Myrtaj	0	1	0	1	
7	15	MF	(Hungary) Dávid Patai	1	0	0	1	
7	25	FW	(France) Sohan Baldoni	0	0	1	1	

Source: Assists statistics on Sofascore

== See also ==
- Debreceni VSC in European football
- List of Debreceni VSC seasons
- List of Debreceni VSC managers
