= 2026–27 Magyar Kupa =

MOL Magyar Kupa
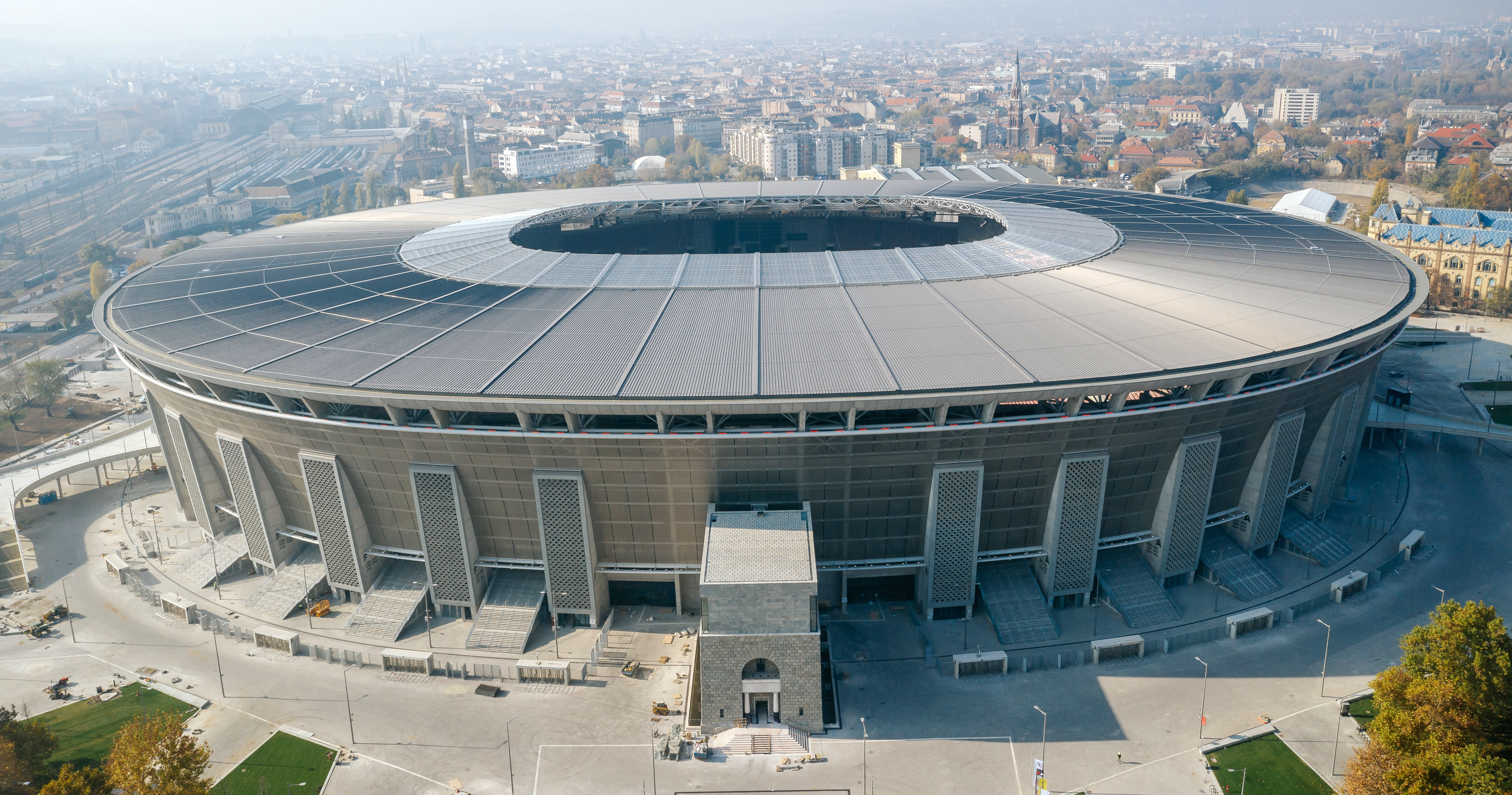
- Puskás Aréna hosted the final

Tournament details
- Country: Hungary
- Dates: 1 August 2026 – 8 May 2027

The 2026–27 Magyar Kupa (lit. 'Hungarian Cup') was the 87th season of Hungary's annual knock-out cup football competition. MOL will be the sponsor of the tournament, thus the sponsored name is MOL Magyar Kupa. The winners will qualify for the 2027–28 UEFA Europa League first qualifying round.

The competition will started on 1 August 2026 and the final will be held on 8 May 2027.

== Competition format ==
The Magyar Kupa is played as a knockout tournament. All rounds are played as one-off matches. The final is traditionally held in the Puskás Aréna, Budapest. A significant change to this year's competition by the Hungarian Football Federation is that the final will take place on a weekend.

The competition consists of eighth proper rounds. All rounds are single-match elimination rounds. When tied after 90 minutes first an extra time period of 30 minutes will be played, then penalties are to be taken if still necessary. All rounds will be drawn randomly, usually either at the completion of the previous round discounting any replays or on the evening of the last televised game of a round being played, depending on television broadcasting rights. Another change is to this year's competition, that the automatic right of lower-class teams to choose their home team among the Round of 32 will be abolished, so in the new competition, a draw will decide the identity of the home team at this stage. The Round of 64 will continue to take place in accordance with the spirit of the cup, with the lower-class teams choosing their home team.

== Calendar ==
| Round | Main date(s) | Fixtures | Clubs | New entries | Leagues entering |
|---|---|---|---|---|---|
| First round | 1–2 August 2026 | 72 | 143 → 72 | 143 | Nemzeti Bajnokság III and Local teams (MB I, MB II, MB III, MB IV) |
| Second round | 21–23 August 2026 | 36 | 72 → 36 | none | none |
| Round of 64 (Third round) | 11–13 September 2026 | 32 | 64 → 32 | 28 | Nemzeti Bajnokság I and Nemzeti Bajnokság II |
| Round of 32 (Fourth round) | 27–29 October 2026 | 16 | 32 → 16 | none | none |
| Round of 16 (Fifth round) | 10 February 2027 | 8 | 16 → 8 | none | none |
| Quarter-finals (Sixth round) | 2 March 2027 | 4 | 8 → 4 | none | none |
| Semi-finals (Seventh round) | 20 April 2027 | 2 | 4 → 2 | none | none |
| Final (Eighth round) | 8 May 2027 | 1 | 2 → 1 | none | none |

== Matches ==
Times up to 24 October 2026 and from 28 March 2027 are CEST (UTC+2). Times from 25 October 2026 to 27 March 2027 are CET (UTC+1).

=== First round ===
Participating teams: Teams in Tier 3 and below entered the first round:

- 2 teams from 2025–26 Nemzeti Bajnokság II (place 15th and 16th),
- 2 teams: losing teams of the Promotion play-offs matches held between the 1st placed teams of the 4 groups of the 2025–26 Nemzeti Bajnokság III,
- 45 teams: 2nd–16th placed teams of the 4 groups of the 2025–26 Nemzeti Bajnokság III (excluding the second teams of the clubs participating in the 2025–26 Nemzeti Bajnokság I and 2025–26 Nemzeti Bajnokság II),
- 94 teams: 2025–26 Megyei Bajnokság I teams that have qualified from the County Cup.
- Total: 143 teams.

The draw for the First round was held on 9 July 2026. Competition Committee of MLSZ (Hungarian Football Federation) divided the teams that reached the first round of the Hungarian Cup into four regional pots based on their geographical location (North-Eastern, South-Eastern, North-Western, South-Western) so that amateur teams would not have to travel across the country for cup matches. A blind draw was used to decide between the four groups, as progression is still decided in one match, and the identity of the field selector was determined either by the draw or by the class difference (the one from the lower tier is the field selector). According to the competition announcement, 144 teams could start, but Martfű withdrew, Algyő became the lucky winner in the South-Eastern group, so only 143 teams will be interested in the first round. The duels are decided in one match.

Even before the first round draw, it was revealed that although Martfű had entered the MOL Hungarian Cup, they ultimately withdrew. After the draw, Tiszaföldvár (tier 4) also withdrew and Dunaújváros (tier 3) made the same decision.

Photo Gallery source: MLSZ

Number of teams per tier entering this round
| Nemzeti Bajnokság I (tier 1) (Note: Nemzeti Bajnokság I and Nemzeti Bajnokság II teams joined the competition in Round of 64.) | Nemzeti Bajnokság II (tier 2) | Nemzeti Bajnokság III (tier 3) | Megyei Bajnokság I (tier 4) | Megyei Bajnokság II (tier 5) | Megyei Bajnokság III (tier 6) | Total |
|---|---|---|---|---|---|---|
| 12 / 12 | 16 / 16 | 46 / 46 | 82 / 82 | 10 / 10 | 5 / 5 | 143 / 171 |

North-Eastern Group

| Team 1 | Score | Team 2 |
1 August 2026
| Hatvan (4) | 3 – 2 | Lőrinci (4) |
| Sényő (4) | 2 – 0 | Nagyecsed (4) |
| Maklár (4) | 1 – 3 | Emőd (4) |
| Karancslapujtő (4) | 3 – 0 | Vizslás (4) |
| DEAC (3) | 3 – 1 | Eger (3) |
| Kaba (6) | 0 – 12 | Salgótarján (3) |
| Vác (4) | 0 – 2 | Mátészalka (3) |
| Balmazújváros (4) | 2 – 4 | Mezőcsát (4) |
| Hajdúsámson (4) | 0 – 10 | Ózd-Sajóvölgye (3) |
| Füzesabony (3) | 1 – 4 | Tiszaújváros (3) |
| Jéke (5) | 1 – 4 | Bátonyterenye (4) |
| Bőcs (5) | 1 – 16 | Tiszafüred (3) |
| Monostorpályi (4) | 2 – 6 | Tarpa (3) |
2 August 2026
| Gyulaháza (5) | 2 – 7 | Újdombrád (4) |
| Edelény (4) | 4 – 0 | Felsőzsolca (4) |
| Ibrány (4) | 3 – 2 | Putnok (4) |
| Kartal (5) | 1 – 1 (a.e.t.) (4 – 2 p) | Bélapátfalva (4) |
| Gesztely (4) | 1 – 8 | Cigánd (3) |

South-Eastern Group

| Team 1 | Score | Team 2 |
1 August 2026
| Algyő (4) | w/o | Martfű |
| Tiszaföldvár (4) | w/o (0 – 3) | ESMTK (Budapest) (3) |
| Dunavarsány (4) | 0 – 2 | Sándorfalva (3) |
| Makó (4) | 0 – 5 | Dabas (3) |
| Pilis (4) | 2 – 2 (a.e.t.) (2 – 4 p) | BKV Előre (Budapest) (3) |
| Kalocsa (4) | 1 – 3 | Felsőpakony (4) |
| Cegléd (4) | 0 – 3 | Gödöllő (3) |
| Dévaványa (4) | 0 – 12 | Gyula (3) |
| Lajosmizse (4) | 1 – 3 | Harta (4) |
| Hódmezővásárhely (3) | 1 – 2 | Szolnok (3) |
| Szabadkikötő (Budapest) (4) | 5 – 2 | Szajol (4) |
| Jamina (Békéscsaba) (4) | 0 – 4 | Monor (3) |
| Törökszentmiklós (4) | 1 – 3 | Dunaharaszti (3) |
| Flotta (Budapest) (4) | 2 – 3 | SZVSE (Szeged) (3) |
2 August 2026
| Ikarus (Budapest) (4) | 5 – 0 | Kondoros (4) |
| Jászalsószentgyörgy (5) | 0 – 2 | Pénzügyőr (Budapest) (4) |
| Mezőmegyer (5) | 0 – 8 | Békéscsaba (3) |
| Kiskundorozsma (4) | 0 – 2 | Jánoshalom (4) |

North-Western Group

| Team 1 | Score | Team 2 |
1 August 2026
| Sárvár (4) | 0 – 3 | Sárisáp (3) |
| Mosonmagyaróvár (3) | 0 – 2 | Tatabánya (3) |
| Tihany (4) | 1 – 10 | Haladás (Szombathely) (3) |
| Andráshida (4) | 2 – 5 | Hévíz (4) |
| Mezőörs (4) | 4 – 2 | Perutz (Pápa) (3) |
| Balatonfüredi USC (4) | 2 – 4 | Andráshida (4) |
| Úrkút (4) | 1 – 3 | Körmend (4) |
| Vasvár (5) | 0 – 1 | Balatonfüred (4) |
| Tata (4) | 0 – 3 | Lébény (4) |
| DAC Nádorváros (Győr) (5) | 0 – 1 | Bicske (3) |
| Koppánymonostor (4) | 0 – 6 | Komárom (3) |
2 August 2026
| Telekes (6) | 1 – 11 | Mór (4) |
| Hárskút (6) | 0 – 10 | Kapuvár (4) |
| Bágyogszovát (6) | 0 – 13 | Dorog (3) |
| Gérce (5) | Interrupted 0 – 3 | Ugod (4) |
| Tát (4) | 0 – 6 | Veszprém (3) |
| Bőny (5) | 4 – 1 | Lukácsháza (4) |
| Zalaszentgrót (4) | 0 – 1 | Sopron (3) |

South-Western Group

| Team 1 | Score | Team 2 |
1 August 2026
| Dunaújváros (3) | w/o (0 – 3) | Érd (3) |
| Balatonlelle (4) | 0 – 5 | Siófok (3) |
| Szepetnek (4) | 0 – 7 | Csepel (3) |
| Ercsi (4) | 0 – 4 | PMFC (3) |
| Szekszárd (3) | 0 – 2 | PTE-PEAC (Pécs) (3) |
| Dombóvár (4) | 1 – 6 | Majos (Bonyhád) (3) |
| Fadd (4) | 0 – 6 | TFSE (Budapest) (4) |
| Nagyatád (4) | 0 – 1 | Balatoni Vasas (Siófok) (4) |
| Komló (4) | 0 – 5 | Sárbogárd (3) |
| Mágocs (6) | 1 – 8 | 43. sz. Építők (Budapest) (4) |
| Kaposfüred (4) | 1 – 3 | Nagykozár (4) |
| Baja (4) | 7 – 0 | Főnix (Székesfehérvár) (4) |
| Iváncsa (3) | 2 – 0 | Budafok (3) |
| Bátaszék (4) | 1 – 5 | Kaposvár (3) |
| Zsámbék (4) | 1 – 3 | Csepel UFC (4) |
| Marcali (4) | 0 – 6 | III. Kerületi TVE (Budapest) (3) |
2 August 2026
| Villány (4) | 4 – 1 | Bölcske (4) |
| Csór (4) | 1 – 1 (a.e.t.) (4 – 2 p) | Budaörs (3) |

=== Second round ===
Participating teams: the 72 First round winners entered the Second round.

- Total: 72 teams.

Number of teams per tier entering this round
| Nemzeti Bajnokság I (tier 1) | Nemzeti Bajnokság II (tier 2) | Nemzeti Bajnokság III (tier 3) | Megyei Bajnokság I (tier 4) | Megyei Bajnokság II (tier 5) | Megyei Bajnokság III (tier 6) | Total |
|---|---|---|---|---|---|---|
| 12 / 12 | 16 / 16 | 37 / 46 | 33 / 82 | 2 / 10 | 0 / 5 | 72 / 171 |

North-Eastern Group

| Team 1 | Score | Team 2 |
21 August 2026
| Salgótarján (3) | 0 – 2 | Mátészalka (3) |
22 August 2026
| Emőd (4) | 1 – 1 (a.e.t.) (5 – 3 p) | Tarpa (3) |
| Mezőcsát (4) | 3 – 5 | Hatvan (4) |
| Bátonyterenye (4) | 0 – 0 (a.e.t.) (4 – 5 p) | Tiszaújváros (3) |
| Karancslapujtő (4) | 5 – 0 | Edelény (4) |
| Újdombrád (4) | 0 – 3 | Cigánd (3) |
23 August 2026
| Kartal (5) | 0 – 5 | DEAC (3) |
| Ibrány (4) | 0 – 2 | Ózd-Sajóvölgye (3) |
| Sényő (4) | 0 – 1 | Tiszafüred (3) |

South-Eastern Group

| Team 1 | Score | Team 2 |
21 August 2026
| Sándorfalva (3) | 1 – 3 | Szolnok (3) |
| Gyula (3) | 5 – 1 | BKV Előre (Budapest) (3) |
| Monor (3) | 3 – 1 | Békéscsaba (3) |
| Ikarus (Budapest) (4) | 2 – 3 | Dunaharaszti (3) |
22 August 2026
| Felsőpakony (4) | 1 – 3 | Dabas (3) |
| Pénzügyőr (Budapest) (4) | 1 – 2 | Harta (4) |
| Jánoshalom (4) | 0 – 5 | SZVSE (Szeged) (3) |
| Algyő (4) | 0 – 3 | ESMTK (Budapest) (3) |
23 August 2026
| Szabadkikötő (Budapest) (4) | 0 – 2 | Gödöllő (3) |

North-Western Group

| Team 1 | Score | Team 2 |
22 August 2026
| Veszprém (3) | 0 – 1 | Haladás (Szombathely) (3) |
| Kapuvár (4) | 1 – 2 | Tatabánya (3) |
| Hévíz (4) | 3 – 1 | Balatonfüred (4) |
| Bicske (3) | 3 – 1 | Sárisáp (3) |
23 August 2026
| Bőny (5) | 0 – 2 | Lébény (4) |
| Ugod (4) | 0 – 4 | Komárom (3) |
| Körmend (4) | 1 – 8 | Mezőörs (4) |
| Mór (4) | 0 – 7 | Dorog (3) |
| Andráshida (4) | 2 – 8 | Sopron (3) |

South-Western Group

| Team 1 | Score | Team 2 |
21 August 2026
| Érd (3) | 0 – 3 | Iváncsa (3) |
| PMFC (3) | 3 – 0 | Sárbogárd (3) |
| Kaposvár (3) | 1 – 0 | PTE-PEAC (Pécs) (3) |
22 August 2026
| Baja (4) | 2 – 0 | Csór (4) |
| TFSE (Budapest) (4) | 2 – 0 | Siófok (3) |
| 43. sz. Építők (Budapest) (4) | 2 – 3 | Villány (4) |
| Csepel UFC (4) | 0 – 3 | Csepel (3) |
| Balatoni Vasas (Siófok) (4) | 0 – 1 | Nagykozár (4) |
| Majos (Bonyhád) (3) | 7 – 2 | III. Kerületi TVE (Budapest) (3) |

=== Round of 64 ===
Participating teams: 36 winners of second round, 12 teams in Nemzeti Bajnokság I (tier 1), and 16 teams in Nemzeti Bajnokság II (tier 2) entered the Round of 64.
The draw for the Round of 64 was held on 24 August 2026. The draw was conducted by 37-time Hungarian national team player Krisztián Németh in the studio of M4 Sport Channel.

Number of teams per tier entering this round
| Nemzeti Bajnokság I (tier 1) | Nemzeti Bajnokság II (tier 2) | Nemzeti Bajnokság III (tier 3) | Megyei Bajnokság I (tier 4) | Megyei Bajnokság II (tier 5) | Megyei Bajnokság III (tier 6) | Total |
|---|---|---|---|---|---|---|
| 12 / 12 | 16 / 16 | 25 / 46 | 11 / 82 | 0 / 10 | 0 / 5 | 64 / 171 |

| Team 1 | Score | Team 2 |
11 September 2026
| Sopron (3) | 6 – 3 | SZVSE (Szeged) (3) |
12 September 2026
| DEAC (3) | 0 – 7 | Ferencváros (1) |
| Nagykozár (4) | 0 – 9 | Kisvárda (1) |
| Kazincbarcika (2) | 1 – 2 | Paks (1) |
| Gödöllő (3) | 2 – 3 | Debrecen (1) |
| Majos (Bonyhád) (3) | 1 – 8 | Nyíregyháza (1) |
| TFSE (Budapest) (4) | 1 – 3 | Vasas (1) |
| Baja (4) | 0 – 7 | Kispest-Honvéd (1) |
| Iváncsa (3) | 0 – 4 | Szeged-Csanád GA (2) |
| Harta (4) | 0 – 1 | Bicske (3) |
| Cigánd (3) | 3 – 2 (a.e.t.) | Dabas (3) |
| Hatvan (4) | 1 – 4 | Kaposvár (3) |
| Tatabánya (3) | 4 – 5 | Kecskemét (2) |
| Mátészalka (3) | 1 – 3 | Kozármisleny (2) |
| Monor (3) | 1 – 1 (a.e.t.) (7 – 6 p) | Nagykanizsa (2) |
| Karancslapujtő (4) | 2 – 4 | Tiszaújváros (3) |
| Szolnok (3) | 3 – 1 | Komárom (3) |
| Hévíz (4) | 1 – 6 | Soroksár (2) |
| Diósgyőr (2) | 4 – 1 | Videoton (2) |
| Haladás (Szombathely) (3) | 4 – 0 | Tiszafüred (3) |
| PMFC (3) | 3 – 2 | Tiszakécske (2) |
| Ajka (2) | 2 – 2 (a.e.t.) (6 – 5 p) | BVSC-Zugló (2) |
| Mezőkövesd (2) | 0 – 2 | MTK (1) |
| Gyirmót (2) | 1 – 0 | Csákvár (2) |
13 September 2026
| Dorog (3) | 0 – 2 (a.e.t.) | Újpest (1) |
| Mezőörs (4) | 1 – 8 | Puskás Akadémia (1) |
| Dunaharaszti (3) | 1 – 5 | Zalaegerszeg (1) |
| Karcag (2) | 1 – 5 | ETO Győr (1) |
| Villány (4) | 1 – 3 | Csepel (3) |
| Emőd (4) | 0 – 5 | Ózd–Sajóvölgye (3) |
| Gyula (3) | 0 – 1 | Szentlőrinc (2) |
| Lébény (4) | 1 – 7 | ESMTK (Budapest) (3) |

==== Matches ====
| 11 September 2026 | Sopron (3) | 6–3 | SZVSE (Szeged) (3) | Sopron |
| 17:00 CEST | Kulcsár 16'; Végh 33' (yellow card) 68'; D. Tóth (yellow card) 49' (goal) 55'; Cserkuti-Németh 64'; Reseterits 77'; Rádai 90+2' (o.g.) | Report | Rádai 27'; Cs. Kis 50', 59'; Kelemen (yellow card) 82' | Stadium: Káposztás utcai Stadion; Referee: László Szalai |

| 12 September 2026 | DEAC (3) | 0–7 | Ferencváros (1) | Debrecen |
| 13:00 CEST | Maruscsák (yellow card) 58' | Report | Bero 1', 7', 63'; Cs. Lakatos 12' (yellow card) 46'; Kovačević 38'; Zachariassen 78' (pen.); Levi 89' (pen.) | Stadium: DEAC Stadion; Attendance: 2,000; Referee: Bence Hanyecz |

| 12 September 2026 | Nagykozár (4) | 0–9 | Kisvárda (1) | Nagykozár |
| 15:00 CEST | Duraku (yellow card) 76' | Report | Mešanović 17' (pen.), 19'; B. Bíró 36' (yellow card) 62'; Šerbečić 44'; Terziohlo 49'; Novotny 57' (pen.); Youga 60'; Ésik 76'; I. Soltész 84' | Stadium: Sporttelep; Attendance: 1,100; Referee: Attila Molnár |

| 12 September 2026 | Kazincbarcika (2) | 1–2 | Paks (1) | Kazincbarcika |
| 15:00 CEST | Palincsár 1'; L. Rácz (yellow card) 85' | Report | Hahn 37'; Lenzsér (yellow card) 38'; Debreceni (yellow card) 46'; Silye 60' | Stadium: Kolorcity Aréna; Attendance: 762; Referee: Balázs Katona |

| 12 September 2026 | Gödöllő (3) | 2–3 | Debrecen (1) | Gödöllő |
| 13:00 CEST | Mertse 55'; K. Balog 68' (yellow card) 90+5'; Z. Nagy (yellow card) 87' | Report | Egri 19'; V. Dénes (yellow card) 24'; Tercza 36'; Batik (yellow card) 54'; Á. Szendrei 90'; Myrtaj (yellow card) 90+3' | Stadium: Szűcs Lajos Sportcentrum; Attendance: 900; Referee: Tamás Ujhelyi |

| 12 September 2026 | Majos (Bonyhád) (3) | 1–8 | Nyíregyháza (1) | Majos |
| 15:00 CEST | Fiáth (yellow card) 34'; R. Marosi 45' (pen.); Z. Dávid (yellow card) 52'; M. Farkas (red card) 82'; B. Tóth (yellow card) 84' | Report | Medved 6', 50' (pen.), 90' (penalty missed) 83'; M. Katona 8', 62'; B. Katona 19'; Regža 24' (pen.); Kaczvinszki (yellow card) 44'; Cs. Máté 64' | Stadium: Sporttelep; Referee: Gergely Bana |

| 12 September 2026 | TFSE (Budapest) (4) | 1–3 | Vasas (1) | Budapest |
| 15:00 CEST | K. Tóth (yellow card) 51'; Forrai 89' | Report | R. Horváth 36'; Radó 55'; Otigba (yellow card) 59'; Pethő 86' | Stadium: Szőnyi úti Stadion; Attendance: 850; Referee: Bálint Juhász |

| 12 September 2026 | Baja (4) | 0–7 | Kispest-Honvéd (1) | Baja |
| 15:00 CEST | Rockenstein (yellow card) 47' | Report | T. Somogyi 8', 29', 68'; Pinte 15'; Eddarraj 39'; Alic 45'; Hangya 73' (pen.) | Stadium: Városi Sporttelep; Attendance: 1,000; Referee: Árpád Jakab |

| 12 September 2026 | Iváncsa (3) | 0–4 | Szeged-Csanád GA (2) | Iváncsa |
| 15:00 CEST | | Report | Tóth-Gábor 30'; Zimonyi 45+2'; Rabatin 74'; Ádám 81' (pen.) | Stadium: Károlyi István Sporttelep; Referee: Patrik Fehérvári |

| 12 September 2026 | Harta (4) | 0–1 | Bicske (3) | Harta |
| 15:00 CEST | T. Fekete (yellow card) 26'; Báló (yellow card) 54' | Report | Knolmár (yellow card) 24'; Grünfelder (yellow card) 35'; Pócs (red card) 56'; Hirman (yellow card) 77'; S. Molnár 87' | Stadium: Sporttelep; Referee: Benedek Székely |

| 12 September 2026 | Cigánd (3) | 3–2 (a.e.t.) | Dabas (3) | Cigánd |
| 15:00 CEST | G. Kovács 17', 114'; Králik (yellow card) 35'; Babics (yellow card) 91'; Csáki (yellow card) 106'; Z. Horváth 109' | Report | Vén (yellow card) 30'; Birkás (yellow card) 35'; Földi 54'; Bán (yellow card) 60'; Dudás 119' | Stadium: Városi Stadion; Referee: Tamás Takács |

| 12 September 2026 | Hatvan (4) | 1–4 | Kaposvár (3) | Hatvan |
| 15:00 CEST | Kitl (yellow card) 13'; Mundi (yellow card) 37' (goal) 41'; Dinka (yellow card) 39' | Report | Szederkényi 8'; Mazzonetto 31'; Mayer 38'; Somogyi-Bakos (yellow card) 42'; Hadaró (yellow card) 45'; M. Szabó 50' | Stadium: Népkerti Sporttelep; Referee: Csaba Sándor |

| 12 September 2026 | Tatabánya (3) | 4–5 | Kecskemét (2) | Tatabánya |
| 15:00 CEST | Gaszner 4'; D. Kovács (yellow card) 16'; Deutsch (yellow card) 29'; Vernes 40', 62' (pen.); Ominger 49'; Szegleti (yellow card) 66' | Report | B. Németh 8' (yellow card) 42'; Szegleti 31' (o.g.); Berki 33'; Szojma (yellow card) 45'; Szépe 59'; B. Kovács 67' | Stadium: Grosics Gyula Stadion; Referee: Ádám Papp |

| 12 September 2026 | Mátészalka (3) | 1–3 | Kozármisleny (2) | Mátészalka |
| 15:00 CEST | H. Kiss (yellow card) 23'; Micovda 50'; B. Bényei (yellow card) 73'; Farkas (yellow card) 87' | Report | Herczeg 6'; Zamostny 23' (pen.) (yellow card) 56'; Gellér 28' (yellow card) 88'; Stumpf (yellow card) 83'; Turi (yellow card) 90' | Stadium: Városi Sporttelep; Referee: Edmond Erni |

| 12 September 2026 | Monor (3) | 1–1 (7–6 p) (a.e.t.) | Nagykanizsa (2) | Monor |
| 15:00 CEST | Kutsera (yellow card) 74'; Ciceu 77'; Makai (yellow card) 92' | Report | Major (yellow card) 68'; B. Lőrincz (yellow card) 58' (goal) 85'; B. Kovács (yellow card) 98' | Stadium: Balassi Bálint utcai Stadion; Referee: Tamás Sipos |

| 12 September 2026 | Karancslapujtő (4) | 2–4 | Tiszaújváros (3) | Karancslapujtő |
| 15:00 CEST | P. Tóth (red card) 9'; Harrach 46'; Budveszel (yellow card) 46'; Orosházi 61' (pen.); Domán (yellow card) 70'; Juhász (yellow card) 76' | Report | G. Nagy (yellow card) 20'; Batta 21'; Erdei 25'; Lekli 28', 85' (yellow card) 81'; Vitelki (yellow card) 46'; Juhos (yellow card) 70' | Stadium: Sporttelep; Referee: Mihály Török |

| 12 September 2026 | Szolnok (3) | 3–1 | Komárom (3) | Szolnok |
| 15:00 CEST | Antal (yellow card) 29' (goal) 52'; Iván (yellow card) 57'; Pinto 64'; Tomic (yellow card) 79'; Pelles 80'; Dósa (yellow card) 84' | Report | P. Nagy (yellow card) 36'; Bögi 42'; Szecsődi (yellow card) 73'; Székely (red card) 84'; Farkas (yellow card) 87' | Stadium: Tiszaligeti Stadion; Referee: Attila Nagy |

| 12 September 2026 | Hévíz (4) | 1–6 | Soroksár (2) | Hévíz |
| 15:00 CEST | M. Szabó 37' | Report | Halmai 17'; L. Lukács 36', 56'; Zs. Kálnoki-Kis 59'; Rónaszélki 77'; K. Horváth K. 90' | Stadium: Városi Sporttelep; Attendance: 400; Referee: András Gáspár |

| 12 September 2026 | Diósgyőr (2) | 4–1 | Videoton (2) | Miskolc |
| 16:00 CEST | Galántai 10', 32'; Babinszky 25', 58' | Report | Bertók (yellow card) 60'; Hesz (yellow card) 63'; E. Kovács 67'; Dubecz (yellow card) 87'; Kelemen (yellow card) 90+3' | Stadium: Diósgyőri Stadion; Attendance: 1,569; Referee: Balázs Berke |

| 12 September 2026 | Haladás (Szombathely) (3) | 4–0 | Tiszafüred (3) | Szombathely |
| 16:00 CEST | M. Tóth (yellow card) 32'; E. Tóth 37', 47'; Sági (yellow card) 59'; Juhász 72'; O. Tamás (yellow card) 81'; Moharos 89' | Report | M. Balogh (yellow card) 16' | Stadium: Haladás Sportkomplexum; Referee: Flórián Holczbauer |

| 12 September 2026 | PMFC (3) | 3–2 | Tiszakécske (2) | Pécs |
| 17:00 CEST | Novák 38'; Kóródi 65'; P. Horváth 81' | Report | Wirth (yellow card) 23' (goal) 41'; Myke 68' (red card) 88'; Bódi (red card) 88'; J. Varga (yellow card) 90+5' | Stadium: Stadion PMFC; Attendance: 800; Referee: Tibor Farkas |

| 12 September 2026 | Ajka (2) | 2–2 (6–5 p) (a.e.t.) | BVSC-Zugló (2) | Ajka |
| 17:00 CEST | Doncsecz 12'; B. Szabó 61'; E. Németh (yellow card) 66'; Bocskay (yellow card) 80' | Report | P. Törőcsík (yellow card) 5'; Lehoczky (yellow card) 48'; Bacsa (yellow card) 72'; Csernik 73'; N. Kovács 74' (red card) 78' | Stadium: Városi Sportcentrum; Referee: Ákos Gaál |

| 12 September 2026 | Mezőkövesd (2) | 0–2 | MTK (1) | Mezőkövesd |
| 17:30 CEST | Ternován (yellow card) 21'; Csatári (yellow card) 55'; Csörgő (red card) 61' | Report | Szuhodovszki 30'; Komáromi 59'; Bakó (yellow card) 74'; P. Kovács (yellow card) 76' | Stadium: Városi Stadion; Referee: Ákos Takács |

| 12 September 2026 | Gyirmót (2) | 1–0 | Csákvár (2) | Győr-Gyirmót |
| 18:00 CEST | Lányi 33'; T. Nagy (yellow card) 86' | Report | Kancsij (yellow card) 69'; Benkő (yellow card) 79' | Stadium: Ménfői úti Stadion; Attendance: 678; Referee: Gergő Muhari |

| 13 September 2026 | Dorog (3) | 0–2 (a.e.t.) | Újpest (1) | Dorog |
| 14:00 CEST | Száhl (yellow card) 49'; Szamosi (yellow card) 66'; Kövesdi (yellow card) 81'; Szilágyi (yellow card) 87' | Report | Mi. Mucsányi (yellow card) 12'; Gleofilo (yellow card) 40'; Balladom (yellow card) 87'; Krajovics (yellow card) 90'; Zeke 102'; Krajcsovics 117' | Stadium: Buzánszky Jenő Stadion; Referee: Márió Zimmermann |

| 13 September 2026 | Mezőörs (4) | 1–8 | Puskás Akadémia (1) | Mezőörs |
| 15:00 CEST | Deákovits (yellow card) 6' (goal) 63'; Wágenhoffer (yellow card) 36'; Végh (red card) 44' | Report | B. Farkas 22', 67'; Colley 30', 40'; Zs. Nagy 38' (pen.); Lukács 60' (pen.); P. Dárdai 78'; A. Németh 89' | Stadium: Sporttelep; Attendance: 800; Referee: Gábor Iványi |

| 13 September 2026 | Dunaharaszti (3) | 1–5 | Zalaegerszeg (1) | Dunaharaszti |
| 15:00 CEST | Szalai (red card) 40'; Amato 60' (o.g.); Vitányi (yellow card) 73'; Bata (yellow card) 90+2' | Report | Babos 12', 32'; Diogo Silva 17'; Krevszun 24'; Maigana (yellow card) 46'; Kujovic (yellow card) 70'; Madaki 71'; Calderon (yellow card) 79' | Stadium: Sporttelep; Attendance: 500; Referee: Márton Rúsz |

| 13 September 2026 | Karcag (2) | 1–5 | ETO Győr (1) | Karcag |
| 15:00 CEST | Szűcs (yellow card) 23'; Szekszárdi (yellow card) 25'; K. Varga 57' (pen.); Kovalovszki (yellow card) 85'; Győri (yellow card) 90+1' | Report | Rotaru 18'; Bennette 27'; Đukanović 29'; Krpić (yellow card) 38'; Vlădoiu 44'; Huszár 87'; Štefulj 90' | Stadium: Lipcsey Elemér Sporttelep; Referee: Barnabás Drabon |

| 13 September 2026 | Villány (4) | 1–3 | Csepel (3) | Villány |
| 15:00 CEST | Kelemen 31' | Report | Giuliani 33'; Túri (yellow card) 35'; Bogdán 44', 45' (yellow card) 67'; Alarishi (yellow card) 55'; Bencsetler (yellow card) 75' | Stadium: Sporttelep; Referee: János Dobai |

| 13 September 2026 | Emőd (4) | 0–5 | Ózd–Sajóvölgye (3) | Emőd |
| 15:00 CEST | Sebestyén (yellow card) 58' | Report | Pataki 27', 44'; Lakatos (yellow card) 55'; S. Horváth 68', 88'; Molnár (yellow card) 70'; Süttő 86' (pen.) | Stadium: Sporttelep; Referee: Szabolcs Gindl |

| 13 September 2026 | Gyula (3) | 0–1 | Szentlőrinc (2) | Gyula |
| 15:00 CEST | Zádori (yellow card) 33'; Zs. Szabó (yellow card) 77'; Lestyán (yellow card) 87' | Report | Samson (yellow card) 16'; Bolla (yellow card) 37'; Pálfalvi (yellow card) 69'; Rideg 76'; P. Weisz (yellow card) 90+2' | Stadium: Christián László Municipal Sports Complex; Referee: Mátyás Dédesi dr. |

| 13 September 2026 | Lébény (4) | 1–7 | ESMTK (Budapest) (3) | Lébény |
| 15:00 CEST | Lasz (yellow card) 12' (goal) 58' (pen.); Pereira (yellow card) 65'; Hilmer (yellow card) 69' | Report | Burzi 4', 48'; Hegyi 50'; Molnár 53' (pen.), 83'; Arday (red card) 61'; M. Balogh 70' (pen.); Kocsis 85'; R. Molnár (yellow card) 87' | Stadium: Sporttelep; Referee: Máté Pázsi |

=== Round of 32 ===
Participating teams: 32 winners of Round of 64.
The draw for the Round of 32 was held on 14 September 2026. The draw was conducted by former national team head coach Imre Gellei in the studio of M4 Sport Channel.

Number of teams per tier entering this round
| Nemzeti Bajnokság I (tier 1) | Nemzeti Bajnokság II (tier 2) | Nemzeti Bajnokság III (tier 3) | Megyei Bajnokság I (tier 4) | Megyei Bajnokság II (tier 5) | Megyei Bajnokság III (tier 6) | Total |
|---|---|---|---|---|---|---|
| 12 / 12 | 8 / 16 | 12 / 46 | 0 / 82 | 0 / 10 | 0 / 5 | 32 / 171 |

| Team 1 | Score | Team 2 |
27 October 2026
| Kaposvár (3) | 0 – 2 | Ajka (2) |
| Gyirmót (2) | 3 – 1 | Kispest-Honvéd (1) |
28 October 2026
| Bicske (3) | 1 – 4 | Ferencváros (1) |
| Csepel (3) | 2 – 3 | Debrecen (1) |
| Ózd–Sajóvölgye (3) | 1 – 3 (a.e.t.) | Nyíregyháza (1) |
| Cigánd (3) | 1 – 2 | Paks (1) |
| Szentlőrinc (2) | 3 – 4 | Vasas (1) |
| Monor (3) | 1 – 5 | MTK (1) |
| Tiszaújváros (3) | 0 – 4 | Kecskemét (2) |
| ESMTK (Budapest) (3) | 0 – 0 (a.e.t.) (4 – 2 p) | Haladás (Szombathely) (3) |
| Sopron (3) | 3 – 0 | Szolnok (3) |
| Kozármisleny (2) | 3 – 2 | Soroksár (2) |
| Diósgyőr (2) | 1 – 2 | Puskás Akadémia (1) |
| PMFC (3) | 4 – 2 | Kisvárda (1) |
| Zalaegerszeg (1) | 3 – 1 | ETO Győr (1) |
29 October 2026
| Szeged-Csanád GA (2) | 1 – 3 | Újpest (1) |

==== Matches ====
| 27 October 2026 | Kaposvár (3) | 0–2 | Ajka (2) | Kaposvár |
| 12:30 CET | Hadaró (yellow card) 43'; Polák (yellow card) 65'; Hampuk (yellow card) 68' | Report | Csizmadia 45'; Artner 72'; Papp (yellow card) 90+1' | Stadium: Rákóczi Stadion; Attendance: 300; Referee: Tamás Sipos |

| 27 October 2026 | Gyirmót (2) | 3–1 | Kispest-Honvéd (1) | Győr-Gyirmót |
| 19:00 CET | Novák 5' (yellow card) 60'; T. Nagy (yellow card) 52'; Kichun 56'; Berecz 78'; T. Németh (yellow card) 90' | Report | Pauljević (yellow card) 17'; Hangya (yellow card) 39'; D. Csontos 42'; Safronov (yellow card) 65'; Kántor (yellow card) 79'; Hadžikić (yellow card) 79'; García (yellow card) 80'; Marí (yellow card) 85' | Stadium: Ménfői úti Stadion; Attendance: 1,425; Referee: Attila Molnár |

| 28 October 2026 | Bicske (3) | 1–4 | Ferencváros (1) | Bicske |
| 12:30 CET | Király 17' | Report | Fodor 5' (o.g.); Rommens (yellow card) 16'; Levi 60'; Arzani 62'; Yusuf 86' | Stadium: Sporttelep; Attendance: 1,800; Referee: Tamás Ujhelyi |

| 28 October 2026 | Csepel (3) | 2–3 | Debrecen (1) | Budapest–Csepel |
| 12:30 CET | L. Tóth 37' (yellow card) 62'; Torda 83' (yellow card) 84' | Report | V. Dénes 42'; Egri 90+2'; Batik (yellow card) 90+2'; D. Kocsis 90+3' | Stadium: Béke téri Stadion; Attendance: 1,500; Referee: Péter Zierkelbach |

| 28 October 2026 | Ózd–Sajóvölgye (3) | 1–3 (a.e.t.) | Nyíregyháza (1) | Putnok |
| 12:30 CET | Molnár (yellow card) 33'; Süttő 37' (pen.); Pataki (yellow card) 87'; S. Horváth (yellow card) 96'; Szemere (yellow card) 111' | Report | Batoum 41'; M. Kovács 102'; Regža 109' (pen.) | Stadium: Várady Béla Sporközpont; Referee: Tamás Takács |

| 28 October 2026 | Cigánd (3) | 1–2 | Paks (1) | Cigánd |
| 12:30 CET | Biró (yellow card) 70'; Z. Horváth 74' | Report | Gyurkits 25'; Lapu (yellow card) 57'; J. Szalai 90+2' | Stadium: Városi Stadion; Attendance: 800; Referee: Ákos Takács |

| 28 October 2026 | Szentlőrinc (2) | 3–4 | Vasas (1) | Szentlőrinc |
| 12:30 CET | Weisz 33'; Pálfalvi 42'; B. Oláh 71'; Samson (yellow card) 90+3' | Report | R. Horváth 19', 49'; Pálinkás 37' (yellow card) 75'; B. Pethő 82' | Stadium: Sporttelep; Attendance: 500; Referee: Balázs Katona |

| 28 October 2026 | Monor (3) | 1–5 | MTK (1) | Monor |
| 12:30 CET | Kapronczai 53' (pen.) | Report | Szuhodovszki 14'; Klausz 36', 49'; I. Bognár (yellow card) 30' (goal) 64'; Jurek 85'; D. Horváth (yellow card) 88' | Stadium: Balassi Bálint utcai Stadion; Attendance: 400; Referee: Bence Hanyecz |

| 28 October 2026 | Tiszaújváros (3) | 0–4 | Kecskemét (2) | Tiszaújváros |
| 12:30 CET | B. Varga (yellow card) 28'; G. Nagy (yellow card) 41' | Report | Merényi 5', 39', 50'; Berki (yellow card) 40'; B. Farkas 48' | Stadium: Sportcentrum; Referee: Gergő Muhari |

| 28 October 2026 | ESMTK (Budapest) (3) | 0–0 (a.e.t.) (4–2 p) | Haladás (Szombathely) (3) | Budapest |
| 12:30 CET | Takács (yellow card) 60'; Slezák (yellow card) 90+5'; Molnár (yellow card) 90+5' | Report | Mihály (yellow card) 8'; Szujó (yellow card) 43' (yellow-red card) 45+1'; Szegedi (yellow card) 71'; Szakály (red card) 90+3'; Orbán (yellow card) 118'; A. Horváth (yellow card) 120' | Stadium: ESMTK Stadion; Attendance: 300; Referee: Barnabás Dragon |
| | Penalties |
| | Burzi (penalty scored); M. Balogh (penalty scored); M. Kovács (penalty scored); J. Molnár (penalty scored) | | Tamás (penalty missed); Batai (penalty scored); Moharos (penalty scored); Szegedi (penalty missed) |

| 28 October 2026 | Sopron (3) | 3–0 | Szolnok (3) | Sopron |
| 17:00 CET | Orosz (yellow card) 14'; Végh 16'; Szóka (yellow card) 28'; M. Kulcsár 33'; Cserkuti-Németh 49'; N. Nagy (yellow card) 52' | Report | P. Pelles (red card) 24'; Dudok (red card) 49' | Stadium: Káposztás utcai Stadion; Referee: Gergely Bana |

| 28 October 2026 | Kozármisleny (2) | 3–2 | Soroksár (2) | Kozármisleny |
| 17:30 CET | Vajda (yellow card) 42'; Zamostny 47'; Kirchner 59' (pen.); D. Dóra 89'; P. Szűcs (yellow card) 90+1' | Report | Zs. Kálnoki-Kis 62'; Tuza 82' | Stadium: Feleki Attila Sportközpont; Referee: Ákos Gaál |

| 28 October 2026 | Diósgyőr (2) | 1–2 | Puskás Akadémia (1) | Miskolc |
| 18:00 CET | Babinszky 60' | Report | Orján (yellow card) 28'; Krupa (yellow card) 35'; Colley 50'; Bárdos (yellow card) 66' 88' (o.g.) | Stadium: Diósgyőri Stadion; Attendance: 1,845; Referee: Imre Kovács |

| 28 October 2026 | PMFC (3) | 4–2 | Kisvárda (1) | Pécs |
| 18:00 CET | Adamcsek 2' (yellow card) 49'; Lengyel (yellow card) 14'; M. Hegedűs 24'; B. Babati 27'; Okorie 67'; Eckl (yellow card) 90+4' | Report | Ostrovka (yellow card) 3'; Herc 47'; Szőr (yellow card) 56'; Melnyk 88'; Chlumecký (yellow card) 90+4' | Stadium: Stadion PMFC; Attendance: 2,000; Referee: Ádám Papp |

| 28 October 2026 | Zalaegerszeg (1) | 3–1 | ETO Győr (1) | Zalaegerszeg |
| 19:00 CET | Alfonso 30' (yellow card) 78'; Gundel-Takács (yellow card) 68'; Tiago 82'; Bumba 90+1' (o.g.) | Report | Štefulj (yellow card) 46'; Bánáti 76' (yellow card) 85' | Stadium: ZTE Arena; Attendance: 2,238; Referee: Gergő Bogár |

| 29 October 2026 | Szeged-Csanád GA (2) | 1–3 | Újpest (1) | Szeged |
| 19:00 CET | Tóth-Gábor 35'; Zvekanov (yellow card) 67'; B. Tóth (yellow card) 85' | Report | Scharmer 10' (yellow card) 55'; K. Horváth (penalty missed) 34'; Matko 76', 86'; Mi. Mucsányi (yellow card) 89' | Stadium: Szent Gellért Fórum; Attendance: 2,977; Referee: Péter Antal |

=== Round of 16 ===
The sixteen Round of 32 winners entered the Round of 16. The draw for the Round of 16 was held on 29 October 2026, after Szeged vs Újpest match. In the M4 Sport studio Attila Herédi—a legend of Újpest FC, a former defender, five-time national team player, Hungarian champion, and three-time cup winner—assisted with the draw. Due to the format introduced last year, the draw covered not only the round of 16 but also the entire bracket, making it possible to see the potential matchups all the way to the final.

Number of teams per tier entering this round
| Nemzeti Bajnokság I (tier 1) | Nemzeti Bajnokság II (tier 2) | Nemzeti Bajnokság III (tier 3) | Megyei Bajnokság I (tier 4) | Megyei Bajnokság II (tier 5) | Megyei Bajnokság III (tier 6) | Total |
|---|---|---|---|---|---|---|
| 9 / 12 | 4 / 16 | 3 / 46 | 0 / 82 | 0 / 10 | 0 / 5 | 16 / 171 |

| Team 1 | Score | Team 2 |
10 February 2027
| Ajka (2) | 17:00 | Debrecen (1) |
TBD (Official match day: 10 February 2027)
| PMFC (3) | v | Ferencváros (1) |
| Kozármisleny (2) | v | Puskás Akadémia (1) |
| Paks (1) | v | Zalaegerszeg (1) |
| ESMTK (Budapest) (3) | v | Vasas (1) |
| Kecskemét (2) | v | Újpest (1) |
| Sopron (3) | v | Gyirmót (2) |
| MTK (1) | v | Nyíregyháza (1) |

==== Matches ====
| 10 February 2027 | Ajka (3) | v | Debrecen (1) | Ajka |
| 17:00 CET | | | | Stadium: Városi Sportcentrum |

| TBD | PMFC (3) | v | Ferencváros (1) | Pécs |
| TBD | | | | Stadium: Stadion PMFC |

| TBD | Kozármisleny (2) | v | Puskás Akadémia (1) | Kozármisleny |
| TBD | | | | Stadium: Feleki Attila Sportközpont |

| TBD | Paks (1) | v | Zalaegerszeg (1) | Paks |
| TBD | | | | Stadium: Fehérvári úti Stadion |

| TBD | ESMTK (Budapest) (3) | v | Vasas (1) | Budapest |
| TBD | | | | Stadium: ESMTK Stadion |

| TBD | Kecskemét (2) | v | Újpest (1) | Kecskemét |
| TBD | | | | Stadium: Széktói Stadion |

| TBD | Sopron (3) | v | Gyirmót (2) | Sopron |
| TBD | | | | Stadium: Káposztás utcai Stadion |

| TBD | MTK (1) | v | Nyíregyháza (1) | Budapest |
| TBD | | | | Stadium: Hidegkuti Nándor Stadion |

=== Quarter-finals ===
The eight Round of 16 winners entered the quarter-finals.

== Bracket ==
Source: M4 Sport

Round of 16
10 February 2027
PMFC (3)
Ferencváros (1)
10 February 2027
Ajka (2)
Debrecen (1)
10 February 2027
Kozármisleny (2)
Puskás Akadémia (1)
10 February 2027
Paks (1)
Zalaegerszeg (1)
10 February 2027
ESMTK (Budapest) (3)
Vasas (1)
10 February 2027
Kecskemét (2)
Újpest (1)
10 February 2027
Sopron (3)
Gyirmót (2)
10 February 2027
MTK (1)
Nyíregyháza (1)

Quarter-finals
2 March 2027
2 March 2027
2 March 2027
2 March 2027

Semi-finals
20 April 2027
20 April 2027

Final
8 May 2027

== Statistics ==
As of match played 29 October 2026

=== Top goalscorers ===
Source: MLSZ Adatbank

| Rank | Player | Club | Goals |
|---|---|---|---|
| 1 | (Hungary) Bence Ferenc Bogdán | Csepel | 6 |
| 2 | (Hungary) Gyula Zoltán Farkas | Kapuvár | 5 |
| 2 | (Hungary) Ábel Mertse | Gödöllő | 5 |
| 4 | (Hungary) Roland Baracskai | Mór | 4 |
| 4 | (Hungary) Marcell Bontó | Hévíz | 4 |
| 4 | (Hungary) Gergő Földi | Dabas | 4 |
| 4 | (Hungary) György Hursán | Gyula | 4 |
| 4 | (Hungary) Dávid Illés | Mezőörs | 4 |
| 4 | (Hungary) Levente Juhász | Haladás (Szombathely) | 4 |
| 4 | (Hungary) Kristóf Korbély | Ózd-Sajóvölgye | 4 |
| 4 | (Hungary) Róbert Marosi | Majos | 4 |
| 4 | (Hungary) Levente Norbert Szűcs | Csepel | 4 |
| 4 | (Hungary) Erik Tóth | Haladás (Szombathely) | 4 |
| 14 | 41 players | | 3 |

== See also ==
- 2026–27 in Hungarian football
- 2026–27 Nemzeti Bajnokság I
