= Debreceni VSC in European football =

Debreceni Vasutas Sport Club is a professional Hungarian football club, based in Debrecen, Hungary.

== Matches ==
Season	Competition	Round	Club	Home	Away	Aggregate
1998	UEFA Intertoto Cup	First round	(Belarus) Dnepr	6–0	4–2	10–2
1998	UEFA Intertoto Cup	Second round	(Czech Republic) Hradec Králové	0–0	1–1	1–1
1998	UEFA Intertoto Cup	Third round	(Germany) Hansa Rostock	1–1	2–1	3–2
1998	UEFA Intertoto Cup	Semi–finals	(Poland) Ruch Chorzów	0–3	0–1	0–4
1999–00	UEFA Cup	First round	(Germany) Wolfsburg	2–1	0–2	2–3
2001–02	UEFA Cup	Qualifying round	(Moldova) Nistru Otaci	3–0	0–1	3–1
2001–02	UEFA Cup	First round	(France) Bordeaux	3–1	1–5	4–6
2003–04	UEFA Cup	Qualifying round	(Lithuania) Ekranas	2–1	1–1	3–2
2003–04	UEFA Cup	First round	(Croatia) Varteks	3–2	3–1	6–3
2003–04	UEFA Cup	Second round	(Greece) PAOK	0–0	1–1	1–1
2003–04	UEFA Cup	Third round	(Belgium) Club Brugge	0–0	0–1	0–1
2004	UEFA Intertoto Cup	First round	(Slovakia) Spartak Trnava	4–1	0–3	4–4
2005–06	UEFA Champions League	Second qualifying round	(Croatia) Hajduk Split	3–0	5–0	8–0
2005–06	UEFA Champions League	Third qualifying round	(England) Manchester United	0–3	0–3	0–6
2005–06	UEFA Cup	First round	(Ukraine) Shakhtar Donetsk	0–2	1–4	1–6
2006–07	UEFA Champions League	Second qualifying round	(North Macedonia) Rabotnički	1–1	1–4	2–5
2007–08	UEFA Champions League	Second qualifying round	(Sweden) Elfsborg	0–1	0–0	0–1
2008–09	UEFA Cup	First qualifying round	(Kazakhstan) Shakhter Karagandy	1–0	1–1	2–1
2008–09	UEFA Cup	Second qualifying round	(Switzerland) Young Boys	2–3	1–4	3–7
2009–10	UEFA Champions League	Second qualifying round	(Sweden) Kalmar	2–0	1–3	3–3
2009–10	UEFA Champions League	Third qualifying round	(Estonia) Levadia Tallinn	1–0	1–0	2–0
2009–10	UEFA Champions League	Play-off round	(Bulgaria) Levski Sofia	2–0	2–1	4–1
2009–10	UEFA Champions League	Group E	(England) Liverpool	0–1	0–1	4th
2009–10	UEFA Champions League	Group E	(France) Lyon	0–4	0–4	4th
2009–10	UEFA Champions League	Group E	(Italy) Fiorentina	3–4	2–5	4th
2010–11	UEFA Champions League	Second qualifying round	(Estonia) Levadia Tallinn	3–2	1–1	4–3
2010–11	UEFA Champions League	Third qualifying round	(Switzerland) Basel	0–2	1–3	1–5
2010–11	UEFA Europa League	Play-off round	(Bulgaria) Litex Lovech	2–0	2–1	4–1
2010–11	UEFA Europa League	Group I	(Ukraine) Metalist Kharkiv	0–5	1–2	4th
2010–11	UEFA Europa League	Group I	(Italy) Sampdoria	2–0	0–1	4th
2010–11	UEFA Europa League	Group I	(Netherlands) PSV Eindhoven	1–2	0–3	4th
2012–13	UEFA Champions League	Second qualifying round	(Albania) Skënderbeu	3–0	0–1	3–1
2012–13	UEFA Champions League	Third qualifying round	(Belarus) BATE Borisov	0–2	1–1	1–3
2012–13	UEFA Europa League	Play-off round	(Belgium) Club Brugge	0–3	1–4	1–7
2013–14	UEFA Europa League	Second qualifying round	(Norway) Strømsgodset	0–3	2–2	2–5
2014–15	UEFA Champions League	Second qualifying round	(Northern Ireland) Cliftonville	2–0	0–0	2–0
2014–15	UEFA Champions League	Third qualifying round	(Belarus) BATE Borisov	1–0	1–3	2–3
2014–15	UEFA Europa League	Play-off round	(Switzerland) Young Boys	0–0	1–3	1–3
2015–16	UEFA Europa League	First qualifying round	(Montenegro) Sutjeska Nikšić	3–0	0–2	3–2
2015–16	UEFA Europa League	Second qualifying round	(Latvia) Skonto	9–2	2–2	11–4
2015–16	UEFA Europa League	Third qualifying round	(Norway) Rosenborg	2–3	1–3	3–6
2016–17	UEFA Europa League	First qualifying round	(San Marino) La Fiorita	2–0	5–0	7–0
2016–17	UEFA Europa League	Second qualifying round	(Belarus) Torpedo-BelAZ Zhodino	1–2	0–1	1–3
2019–20	UEFA Europa League	First qualifying round	(Albania) Kukësi	3–0	1–1	4–1
2019–20	UEFA Europa League	Second qualifying round	(Italy) Torino	1–4	0–3	1–7
2023–24	UEFA Europa Conference League	Second qualifying round	(Armenia) Alashkert	1–2 (a.e.t.)	1–0	2–2 (3–1 p)
2023–24	UEFA Europa Conference League	Third qualifying round	(Austria) Rapid Wien	0–5	0–0	0–5
2026–27	UEFA Conference League	Second qualifying round	(Armenia) Pyunik	1–0	0–0	1–0
2026–27	UEFA Conference League	Third qualifying round	(Denmark) Copenhagen	0–3	1–5	1–8

== Record by country of opposition ==
- Correct as of 6 August 2026

Country	Pld	W	D	L	GF	GA	GD	Win%
Albania	4	2	1	1	7	2	+5	50.00
Armenia	4	2	1	1	3	2	+1	50.00
Austria	2	0	1	1	0	5	−5	0.00
Belarus	8	3	1	4	14	9	+5	37.50
Belgium	4	0	1	3	1	8	−7	0.00
Bulgaria	4	4	0	0	8	2	+6	100.00
Croatia	4	4	0	0	14	3	+11	100.00
Czech Republic	2	0	2	0	1	1	+0	0.00
Denmark	1	0	0	1	0	3	−3	0.00
England	4	0	0	4	0	8	−8	0.00
Estonia	4	3	1	0	6	3	+3	75.00
France	4	1	0	3	4	14	−10	25.00
Germany	4	2	1	1	5	5	+0	50.00
Greece	2	0	2	0	1	1	+0	0.00
Italy	6	1	0	5	8	17	−9	16.67
Kazakhstan	2	1	1	0	2	1	+1	50.00
Latvia	2	1	1	0	11	4	+7	50.00
Lithuania	2	1	1	0	3	2	+1	50.00
(North Macedonia) Macedonia	2	0	1	1	2	5	−3	0.00
Moldova	2	1	0	1	3	1	+2	50.00
Montenegro	2	1	0	1	3	2	+1	50.00
Netherlands	2	0	0	2	1	5	−4	0.00
Northern Ireland	2	1	1	0	2	0	+2	50.00
Norway	4	0	1	3	5	11	−6	0.00
Poland	2	0	0	2	0	4	−4	0.00
San Marino	2	2	0	0	7	0	+7	100.00
Slovakia	2	1	0	1	4	4	+0	50.00
Sweden	4	1	1	2	3	4	−1	25.00
Switzerland	4	0	0	4	4	12	−8	0.00
Ukraine	6	0	1	5	3	16	−13	0.00
Totals	96	32	18	46	125	154	-29	33.33

P – Played; W – Won; D – Drawn; L – Lost; GF – Goals for; GA – Goals against; GD – Goal difference;

== Club record in UEFA competitions ==
As correct of 23 July 2015.

- Biggest win: 23 July 2015, Debrecen 9–2 (Latvia) Skonto FC, Nagyerdei Stadion, Debrecen
- Biggest defeat: 16 September 2010, Debrecen 0–5 (Ukraine) FC Metalist Kharkiv, Puskás Ferenc Stadion, Budapest
- Appearances in UEFA Champions League: 7
- Appearances in UEFA Europa League: 9
- Appearances in UEFA Intertoto Cup: 2
- Player with most UEFA appearances: 48 (Hungary) Kiss
- Top scorers in UEFA club competitions: 10 (Senegal) Sidibe
