= Gert Remmel =

Estonian football coach, born 1975)

Personal information
- Date of birth: 31 December 1975 (age 50)
- Place of birth: Tallinn, then part of Estonian SSR, Soviet Union

Team information
- Current team: Debrecen (manager)

Managerial career
- Years: Team
- 2007–2008: HIFK
- 2009–2011: Honka II
- 2020–2022: Pafos (U19)
- 2022: NK Novigrad
- 2026–: Debrecen

Gert Remmel (born 31 December 1975) is an Estonian professional football manager who is currently in charge of Nemzeti Bajnokság I club Debrecen.

== Coaching career ==
After working for Pallo-Pojat Juniorit (PPJ) in Finland, Remmel started his professional coaching career when joining Pertti Kemppinen in his tanoke-coaching company. During 2007–2008 Remmel was the head coach of HIFK in Finnish third-tier Kakkonen.

Remmel worked as an assistant coach of Veikkausliiga club Honka from 2009 to 2011 in a coaching staff of Mika Lehkosuo. He was also the coach of the club's academy team Pallohonka.

After a few-year hiatus due to study leave, he moved to Italy and worked as an assistant coach of Eccellenza club Giorgione during 2016–2020 with Finnish assistant coaches Iikka Miettinen and Tuomas Silvennoinen. He had completed an UEFA A coaching license in Coverciano, Italy in 2014 and had met Stefano Esposito, whom he had followed to Giorgione.

Later, Remmel has worked for the academy of Pafos in Cyprus, as a head coach of Croatian club NK Novigrad along with Iikka Miettinen and Rasmus Jansson, and for Polish clubs Stal Rzeszów, and Motor Lublin in Ekstraklasa along with Jansson.

In the beginning of 2023, Remmel reunited with Mika Lehkosuo when he joined the coaching staff of the Finland under-21 national team. In November 2024, they guided the Finland U21 team, the Pikkuhuuhkajat, to qualify for the 2025 UEFA U21 Euro final tournament, for the second time in the nation's history.

== Personal life ==
Remmel has also worked as a writer for Finnish sport medias, including Urheilulehti. He has also co-written the autobiography of Përparim Hetemaj. Remmel has also studied football at the University of Lisbon.
