= Adrián Guerrero (footballer, born 1998) =

Spanish footballer (born 1998)

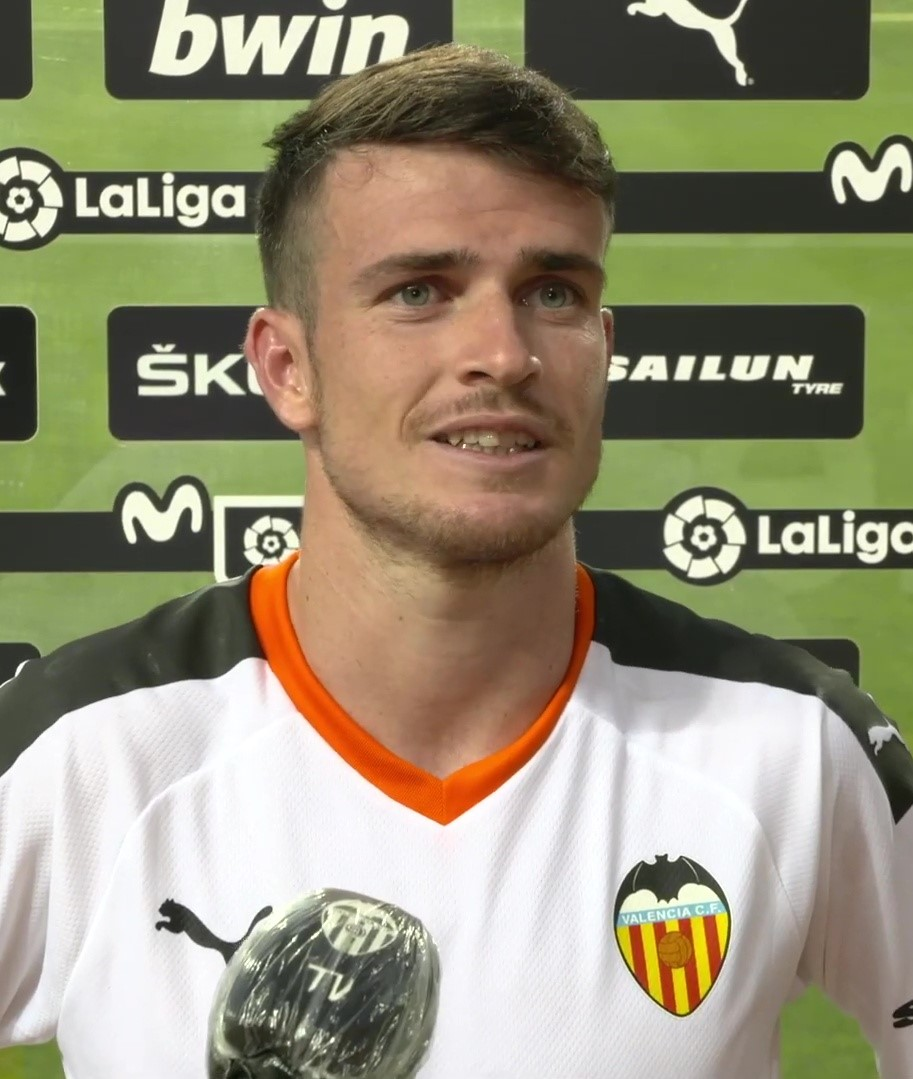
- Guerrero with Valencia in 2021

Personal information
- Full name: Adrián Guerrero Aguilar
- Date of birth: 28 January 1998 (age 28)
- Place of birth: Blanes, Spain
- Height: 1.74 m (5 ft 9 in)
- Position: Left-back

Team information
- Current team: Debrecen
- Number: 3

Youth career
- 2007–2010: Vilassar Mar
- 2010–2017: Barcelona

Senior career*
Years	Team	Apps	(Gls)
2017–2018	Reus B	37	(3)
2018–2019	Reus	8	(0)
2019–2020	Valencia B	40	(2)
2020–2021	Valencia	2	(0)
2020–2021	→ Lugano (loan)	29	(0)
2021–2024	FC Zürich	84	(5)
2024–2025	Tenerife	6	(0)
2025–	Debrecen	23	(3)
- * Club domestic league appearances and goals as of 30 May 2026

Adrián Guerrero Aguilar (born 28 January 1998) is a Spanish professional footballer who plays for Nemzeti Bajnokság I club Debreceni VSC as a left-back.

== Career ==
=== Reus ===
Born in Blanes, Girona, Catalonia, Guerrero joined FC Barcelona's youth academy in 2010 from UE Vilassar de Mar. In August 2017, after finishing his development, he signed for CF Reus Deportiu and was assigned to the reserves in Tercera División.

Guerrero made his senior debut on 20 August 2017, starting in a 0–0 away draw against Palamós CF, and scored his first goal on 1 October in a 1–1 home draw to AE Prat. The following 11 January, he renewed his contract until 2021.

On 27 June 2018, Guerrero was definitely promoted to the first team in Segunda División. His first match in the competition took place on 19 August, when he came on as a second-half substitute for Álex Carbonell in a 0–2 away loss against UD Las Palmas.

=== Valencia ===
Halfway through the 2018–19 season, Guerrero and the rest of the squad left after the club was expelled by the Liga de Fútbol Profesional, and he later moved to Valencia CF Mestalla of Segunda División B. He made his first team – and La Liga – debut on 4 July 2020, replacing Jaume Costa at half-time in a 2–2 away draw against Granada CF.

On 20 August 2020, Guerrero joined Swiss Super League side FC Lugano on loan for the 2020–21 season.

=== Zürich ===
On 30 June 2021, Guerrero signed a three-year contract with FC Zürich also in the Swiss top tier. He scored his first professional goal on 25 July, netting the opener in a 2–0 away win over former side Lugano.

=== Tenerife ===
On 17 July 2024, Guerrero returned to Spain after signing a two-year contract with second division side CD Tenerife.

=== Debrecen ===
On 18 July 2025, Guerrero signed with Debreceni VSC in the Hungarian top tier.
