= Rotem Keller =

Israeli association footballer

Personal information
- Full name: Rotem Moshe Keller
- Date of birth: 9 November 2002 (age 24)
- Place of birth: Hadera, Israel
- Height: 1.83 m (6 ft 0 in)
- Position: Left back

Team information
- Current team: Debreceni VSC

Youth career
- 2010–2012: Hapoel Hadera
- 2012–2020: Maccabi Netanya

Senior career*
Years	Team	Apps	(Gls)
2020–	Maccabi Netanya	98	(3)
2022	→ Diósgyőr (loan)	10	(0)
2023	→ Hapoel Hadera (loan)	6	(0)
2023–2024	→ Bnei Sakhnin (loan)	32	(0)
2026–	Debrecen	0	(0)

International career^{‡}
2017	Israel U16	2	(0)
2018	Israel U17	4	(0)
2023–2024	Israel U21	2	(0)
- * Club domestic league appearances and goals as of 10 June 2026 ‡ National team caps and goals as of 1 July 2022

Rotem Keller (Hebrew: רותם קלר; born 9 November 2002) is an Israeli professional footballer who plays as a center-back for Nemzeti Bajnokság I club Debreceni VSC.

== Club career ==
Keller started his career in the Hapoel Hadera's children team and when he was 10 moved to Maccabi Netanya. On 15 June 2022 Keller made his senior debut with at the 1–3 loss against Bnei Yehuda at the Israeli Premier League.

On 2 February 2022 loaned to the Nemzeti Bajnokság I club Diósgyőr until the end of the season.

On 10 June 2026 signed with Hungarian club Debreceni VSC in Nemzeti Bajnokság I on a three-year contract.

== Career statistics ==
=== Club ===
As of 1 June 2024

Club	Season	League			Cup		League Cup		Continental		Other		Total	
Club	Season	Division	Apps	Goals	Apps	Goals	Apps	Goals	Apps	Goals	Apps	Goals	Apps	Goals
Maccabi Netanya	2019–20	Israeli Premier League	4	0	0	0	0	0	0	0	0	0	4	0
Maccabi Netanya	2020–21	Israeli Premier League	18	0	1	0	4	0	0	0	0	0	23	0
Maccabi Netanya	2021–22	Israeli Premier League	6	0	1	0	1	0	0	0	0	0	8	0
Maccabi Netanya	2022–23	Israeli Premier League	4	0	1	0	2	0	1	0	0	0	8	0
Maccabi Netanya	2024–25	Israeli Premier League	0	0	0	0	0	0	0	0	0	0	0	0
Maccabi Netanya	Total		32	0	3	0	7	0	1	0	0	0	43	0
Diósgyőr	2021–22	Nemzeti Bajnokság II	10	0	0	0	0	0	0	0	0	0	10	0
Diósgyőr	Total		10	0	0	0	0	0	0	0	0	0	10	0
Hapoel Hadera	2022–23	Israeli Premier League	6	0	0	0	0	0	0	0	0	0	6	0
Hapoel Hadera	Total		6	0	0	0	0	0	0	0	0	0	6	0
Bnei Sakhnin	2023–24	Israeli Premier League	32	0	1	0	0	0	0	0	0	0	33	0
Bnei Sakhnin	Total		32	0	1	0	0	0	0	0	0	0	33	0
Career total			70	0	3	0	6	0	1	0	0	0	80	0
