= Ákos Szendrei =

Hungarian footballer (born 2003)

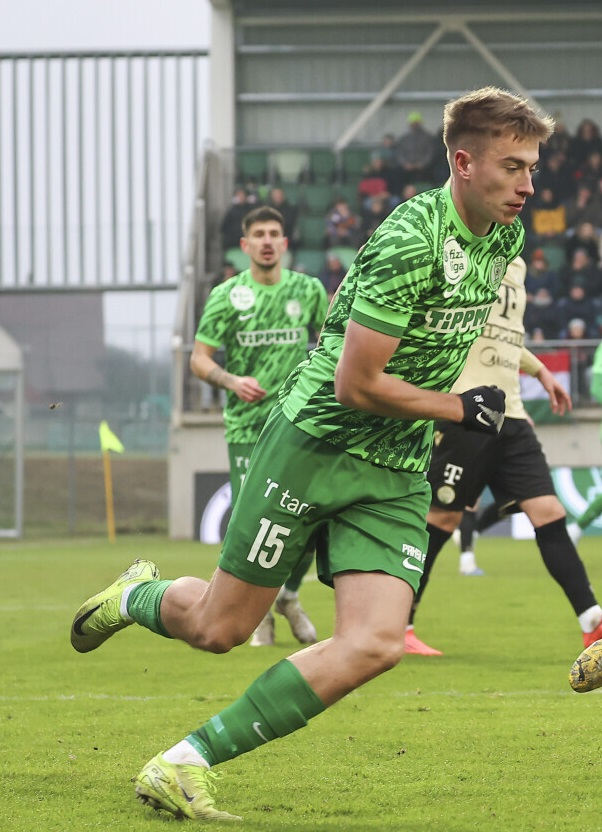
- Szendrei playing for Paks in 2026

Personal information
- Date of birth: 23 January 2003 (age 23)
- Place of birth: Szekszárd, Hungary
- Height: 1.84 m (6 ft 0 in)
- Position: Centre-forward

Team information
- Current team: Debrecen
- Number: 11

Youth career
- 2008–2020: Paks

Senior career*
Years	Team	Apps	(Gls)
2019–2021	Paks	11	(2)
2021–2024	DAC 1904	6	(0)
2022	→ Fehérvár (loan)	3	(0)
2023	→ Győr (loan)	14	(5)
2023–2024	→ Kecskemét (loan)	20	(2)
2025–2026	Paks	20	(6)
2025	→ Mezőkövesd (loan)	15	(4)
2026–	Debrecen	0	(0)

International career^{‡}
2019	Hungary U17	1	(0)
2021	Hungary U18	1	(1)
2021	Hungary U19	5	(2)
2026–	Hungary	2	(0)
- * Club domestic league appearances and goals as of 30 May 2026 ‡ National team caps and goals as of 18 November 2026

Ákos Szendrei (born 23 January 2003) is a Hungarian professional footballer who plays as a centre-forward for Nemzeti Bajnokság I club Debrecen and the Hungary national team.

== Club career ==
=== DAC Dunajská Streda ===
DAC 1904 signed Szendrei as a prospective and talented player in early September 2021 on a five-year contract.

==== Loan to Győr ====
On 18 January 2023, Szendrei was loaned by Győr.

=== Debrecen ===
Debreceni VSC signed Szendrei on 20 July 2026 on a three-year contract.

== Career statistics ==
As of 15 May 2021.

Appearances and goals by club, season and competition
Club	Season	League			Cup		Continental		Other		Total	
Club	Season	Division	Apps	Goals	Apps	Goals	Apps	Goals	Apps	Goals	Apps	Goals
Paks	2019–20	Nemzeti Bajnokság I	3	0	2	0	0	0	—		5	0
Paks	2020–21	Nemzeti Bajnokság I	6	2	2	0	0	0	—		8	2
Paks	2021–22	Nemzeti Bajnokság I	2	0	0	0	0	0	—		2	0
Paks	Total		11	2	4	0	0	0	0	0	15	2
Debrecen	2026–27	Nemzeti Bajnokság I	0	0	0	0	0 (Note: Appearance in 2026–27 UEFA Conference League)	0	—		0	0
Debrecen	Total		0	0	0	0	0	0	0	0	0	0
Career total			11	2	4	0	0	0	0	0	15	2

=== International ===
As of match played 17 November 2026

Appearances and goals by national team and year
National team	Year	Apps	Goals
Hungary	2026	2	0
Total		2	0
