= Bryan Adinany =

Malagasy footballer (born 2000)

Personal information
- Date of birth: 13 March 2000 (age 26)
- Place of birth: Marseille, France
- Height: 1.87 m (6 ft 2 in)
- Position: Forward

Team information
- Current team: Debrecen

Youth career
- Rennes
- 2018–2019: Châteauroux

Senior career*
| Years | Team | Apps | (Gls) |
| 2019–2020 | Châteauroux | 2 | (0) |
| 2019–2020 | Châteauroux II | 22 | (11) |
| 2020–2021 | Gozzano | | |
| 2021–2022 | Saint-Louis Neuweg | 22 | (5) |
| 2022–2023 | US Raon-l'Étape | 24 | (13) |
| 2023–2024 | Le Puy | 25 | (7) |
| 2024–2026 | Lierse | 43 | (12) |
| 2026– | Kortrijk | 9 | (2) |
| 2026– | → Debrecen (loan) | 0 | (0) |

International career^{‡}
| 2025– | Madagascar | 1 | (0) |
- * Club domestic league appearances and goals as of 19 April 2026 ‡ National team caps and goals as of 17:24, 10 June 2025 (UTC)

Bryan Adinany (born 13 March 2000) is a professional footballer who plays as a forward for Hungarian First League club Debreceni VSC, on loan from Belgian Challenger Pro League club Kortrijk. Born in France, he plays for the Madagascar national team.

== Career ==
Adinany is a youth product of Rennes. He joined Châteauroux in 2018, and made his professional debut with the club in a 2–1 Ligue 2 loss to Orléans on 13 February 2019.

In 2020, Adinany joined Italian club Gozzano. In 2021, He left Gozzano to play for FC Saint-Louis Neuweg.

He joined Championnat National 3 club US Raon-l'Étape a year later.

Adinany joined Championnat National 2 club Le Puy in 2023. He made his debut for the club in a 2–0 loss to Hyères.

He scored his first goal with the club in a 2–0 win over Andrézieux.

== Personal life ==
Born in France, Adinany is of Comorian and Malagasy descent. He debuted with Madagascar in a friendly 3–1 loss to DR Congo on 8 June 2025.
