= Jocelyn Janneh =

Sierra Leonean footballer (born 2002)

Personal information
- Date of birth: 6 December 2002 (age 23)
- Place of birth: Freetown, Sierra Leone
- Height: 1.78 m (5 ft 10 in)
- Position: Defensive midfielder

Team information
- Current team: Debrecen

Youth career
- Académie Atouga Foot
- 2018–2022: MC Marrakech

Senior career*
Years	Team	Apps	(Gls)
2022	Kayserispor	1	(0)
2022–2026	Bastia	87	(0)
2026–	Debrecen	0	(0)

International career^{‡}
2025–	Guinea	1	(0)
- * Club domestic league appearances and goals as of 1 September 2026 ‡ National team caps and goals as of 19:58, 9 October 2025 (UTC)

Jocelyn Janneh (born 6 December 2002) is a professional footballer who plays as a defensive midfielder for Debreceni VSC. Born in Sierra Leone, he plays for the Guinea national team.

== Career ==
Born in Sierra Leone, Janneh moved to Guinea at a young age where he trained at the Académie Atouga Foot. At the age of 16, he moved to Morocco with MC Marrakech where he finished his youth development. On 14 January 2022, Janneh joined the Turkish club Kayserispor, signing a three-year contract. He made his professional debut with Kayserispor as a late substitute in a 2–1 Süper Lig loss to Sivasspor on 21 May 2022.

=== Bastia ===
On 23 July 2022, he transferred to the French Ligue 2 club Bastia, signing a three-year contract.

=== Debrecen ===
On 1 September 2026, he transferred to the Hungarian Nemzeti Bajnokság I club Debrecen, signing a three-year contract.

== International career ==
Born in Sierra Leone and raised in Guinea, Janneh holds dual Sierra Leonean and Guinean citizenship. He was called up to the Guinea national team for a set of 2026 FIFA World Cup qualification matches in October 2025.
