= Plamen Andreev =

Bulgarian footballer

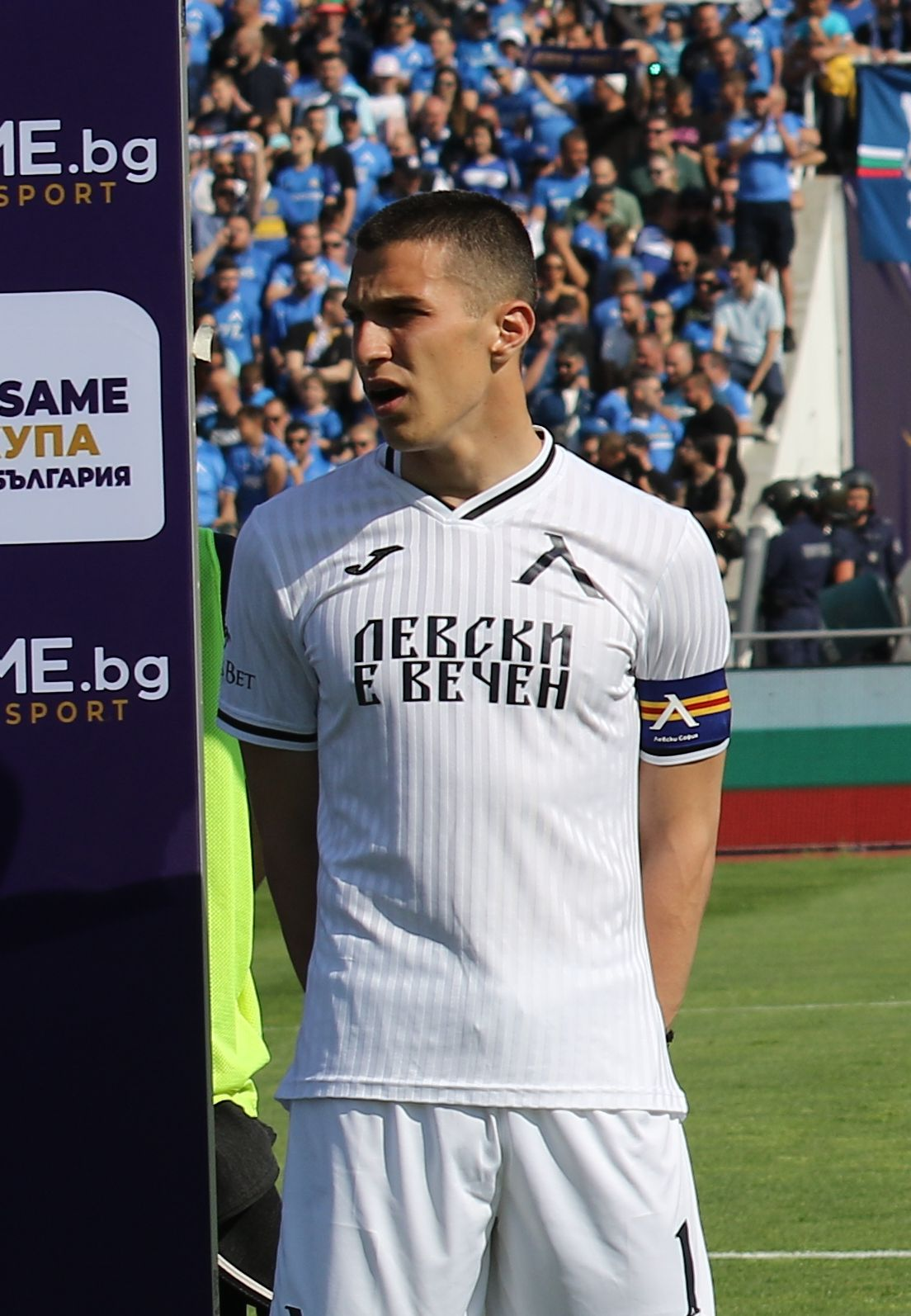
- Andreev with Levski Sofia in 2022

Personal information
- Full name: Plamen Plamenov Andreev
- Date of birth: 15 December 2004 (age 21)
- Place of birth: Sofia, Bulgaria
- Height: 1.92 m (6 ft 4 in)
- Position: Goalkeeper

Team information
- Current team: Debrecen
- Number: 1

Youth career
- –2018: Botev 57
- 2018–2021: Levski Sofia

Senior career*
Years	Team	Apps	(Gls)
2021–2024	Levski Sofia	73	(0)
2024–2026	Feyenoord	1	(0)
2025–2026	→ Racing Santander (loan)	2	(0)
2026	→ Lech Poznań (loan)	1	(0)
2026–	Debrecen	12	(0)

International career^{‡}
2020–2022	Bulgaria U17	5	(0)
2022	Bulgaria U19	6	(0)
2022–	Bulgaria U21	11	(0)
2026–	Bulgaria	1	(0)
- * Club domestic league appearances and goals as of 18:48, 16 November 2026 (UTC) ‡ National team caps and goals as of 20:00, 16 November 2026 (UTC)

Plamen Plamenov Andreev (Bulgarian: Пламен Пламенов Андреев; born 15 December 2004) is a Bulgarian professional footballer who plays as goalkeeper for Nemzeti Bajnokság I club Debrecen and the Bulgaria national team.

== Club career ==
=== Levski Sofia ===
On 23 May 2021, Andreev made his senior debut for Levski Sofia at the age of 16, entering during the last 10 minutes of the final game of the season against Cherno More. He was the starting goalkeeper and captain throughout the 2021–22 Bulgarian Cup won by Levski, conceding only two goals and keeping five clean sheets across all six games.

In August 2022, Andreev was placed 22nd in a CIES ranking for most promising 2004-born players worldwide.

=== Feyenoord ===
On 31 August 2024, Dutch club Feyenoord announced the signing of Andreev on a five-year contract.

==== Loans to Racing Santander and Lech Poznań ====
On 29 July 2025, Andreev was loaned to Spanish second division club Racing Santander. He made five appearances in all competitions before having his loan cut short on 6 January 2026. On that day, he joined Polish Ekstraklasa club Lech Poznań on loan until the end of the season, with an option to buy. His debut came on 19 April 2026 in a league fixture against Pogoń Szczecin. Despite picking up an injury in the second half, he finished the game and made a point-blank save deep into injury time to secure a 2–1 win for his side. This turned out to be Andreev's sole appearance for Lech during their championship-winning season. He left the club in June 2026.

=== Debrecen ===
On 19 June 2026, Andreev moved to Hungarian Nemzeti Bajnokság I club Debrecen on a three-year contract.

== International career ==
Andreev made his debut for the Bulgaria national team on 14 November 2026 in a UEFA Nations League game against Estonia.

== Career statistics ==
As of match played 28 August 2026

Appearances and goals by club, season and competition
Club	Season	League			National cup (Note: Includes Bulgarian Cup, Copa del Rey)		Continental		Other		Total	
Club	Season	Division	Apps	Goals	Apps	Goals	Apps	Goals	Apps	Goals	Apps	Goals
Levski Sofia	2020–21	First League	1	0	0	0	—		—		1	0
Levski Sofia	2021–22	First League	4	0	6	0	—		—		10	0
Levski Sofia	2022–23	First League	33	0	1	0	0	0	1 (Note: Appearance in Bulgarian Supercup)	0	35	0
Levski Sofia	2023–24	First League	30	0	2	0	6 (Note: Appearances in UEFA Europa Conference League)	0	—		38	0
Levski Sofia	2024–25	First League	5	0	0	0	—		—		5	0
Levski Sofia	Total		73	0	9	0	6	0	1	0	89	0
Feyenoord U21	2024–25	U21 Division	3	0	—		—		—		3	0
Feyenoord	2024–25	Eredivisie	1	0	0	0	0	0	—		1	0
Racing Santander (loan)	2025–26	Segunda División	2	0	3	0	—		—		5	0
Lech Poznań (loan)	2025–26	Ekstraklasa	1	0	0	0	0	0	—		1	0
Debrecen	2026–27	Nemzeti Bajnokság I	5	0	0	0	0	0	—		5	0
Career total			85	0	12	0	6	0	1	0	104	0

== Honours ==
Levski Sofia

- Bulgarian Cup: 2021–22

Lech Poznań

- Ekstraklasa: 2025–26

Individual

- Bulgarian First League Best Goalkeeper: 2022–23, 2023–24
- Bulgarian First League Best Young Player: 2022–23
