= Debreceni VSC =

Hungarian football club

Debrecen
- Full name: Debreceni Vasutas Sport Club
- Nickname: Loki
- Short name: DVSC
- Founded: 12 March 1902; 124 years ago
- Ground: Nagyerdei Stadion
- Capacity: 20,340
- Chairman: (England) Mark Stott
- Manager: (Estonia) Gert Remmel
- League: NB I
- 2025–26: NB I, 4th of 12
- Website: dvsc.hu
Home colours	Away colours	Third colours

Debreceni Vasutas Sport Club is a Hungarian professional football club based in Debrecen that competes in the Nemzeti Bajnokság I, the first tier of Hungarian football. They are best known internationally for reaching the group stages of the UEFA Champions League in the 2009–10 season. Debrecen have become the second most successful club in Hungary since 2000, winning the Hungarian League seven times.

== History ==
Debrecen was founded on 12 March 1902 as Debreceni Vasutas Sport Club. The club first reached the Nemzeti Bajnokság I in the 1943–44 season. Debrecen rose to domestic prominence in the early 2000s when they won their first Hungarian league title in 2004–05 season. Since then the club managed to win seven titles in the 2010s total. However, in the late 2010s the club lost its governmental support and started to decline. In the 2016–17 Nemzeti Bajnokság I, they were escaping from relegation.

At international level, Debrecen reached their biggest success when they managed to reach the 2009–10 UEFA Champions League group stage. The following year they reached the group stages of the 2010–11 UEFA Europa League. In the following years, DVSC competed in the Champions League and the European League qualifiers. In 2023-2024, DVSC played in the European Conference League. The team played against the Armenian Alashkert FC and qualified to the next round, in which Loki clashed with Rapid Wien and finished their European journey that year.

== Crest and colours ==
=== Naming history ===
- 1902–12: Egyetértés Football Club
- 1912–48: Debreceni Vasutas
- 1948–49: Debreceni Vasutas Sport Egyesület
- 1949–55: Debreceni Lokomotív
- 1955–56: Debreceni Törekvés
- 1957–79: Debreceni Vasutas Sport Club
- 1979–89: Debreceni Munkás Vasutas Sport Club
- 1989–95: Debreceni Vasutas Sport Club
- 1995–99: DVSC-Epona
- 1999–01: Debreceni VSC
- 2001–02: Netforum-DVSC
- 2002: Debreceni VSC
- 2003–05: DVSC-MegaForce
- 2005–06: DVSC-AVE Ásványvíz
- 2006–16: DVSC-TEVA
- 2016–: Debreceni Vasutas Sport Club

=== Manufacturers and shirt sponsors ===
The following table shows in detail Debreceni VSC kit manufacturers and shirt sponsors by year:

Period	Kit manufacturer	Shirt sponsor
1977–	Adidas	
1993–1995	Adidas	paletta
−2000	Adidas	Epona
2000–2001	Adidas	Soproni Ászok
2001–2002	Adidas	—
2002–2003	Adidas	Arany Ászok
2003–2004	Nike	MegaForce / Arany Ászok
2005	Adidas	Ave Ásványvíz / Arany Ászok
2005–2006	Adidas	Ave Ásványvíz /
2006–2007	Adidas	Teva / Ave Ásványvíz
2008–2009	Adidas	Teva
2009–2010	Adidas	Orangeways / Teva
2010–2016	Adidas	Teva

== Stadiums and facilities ==
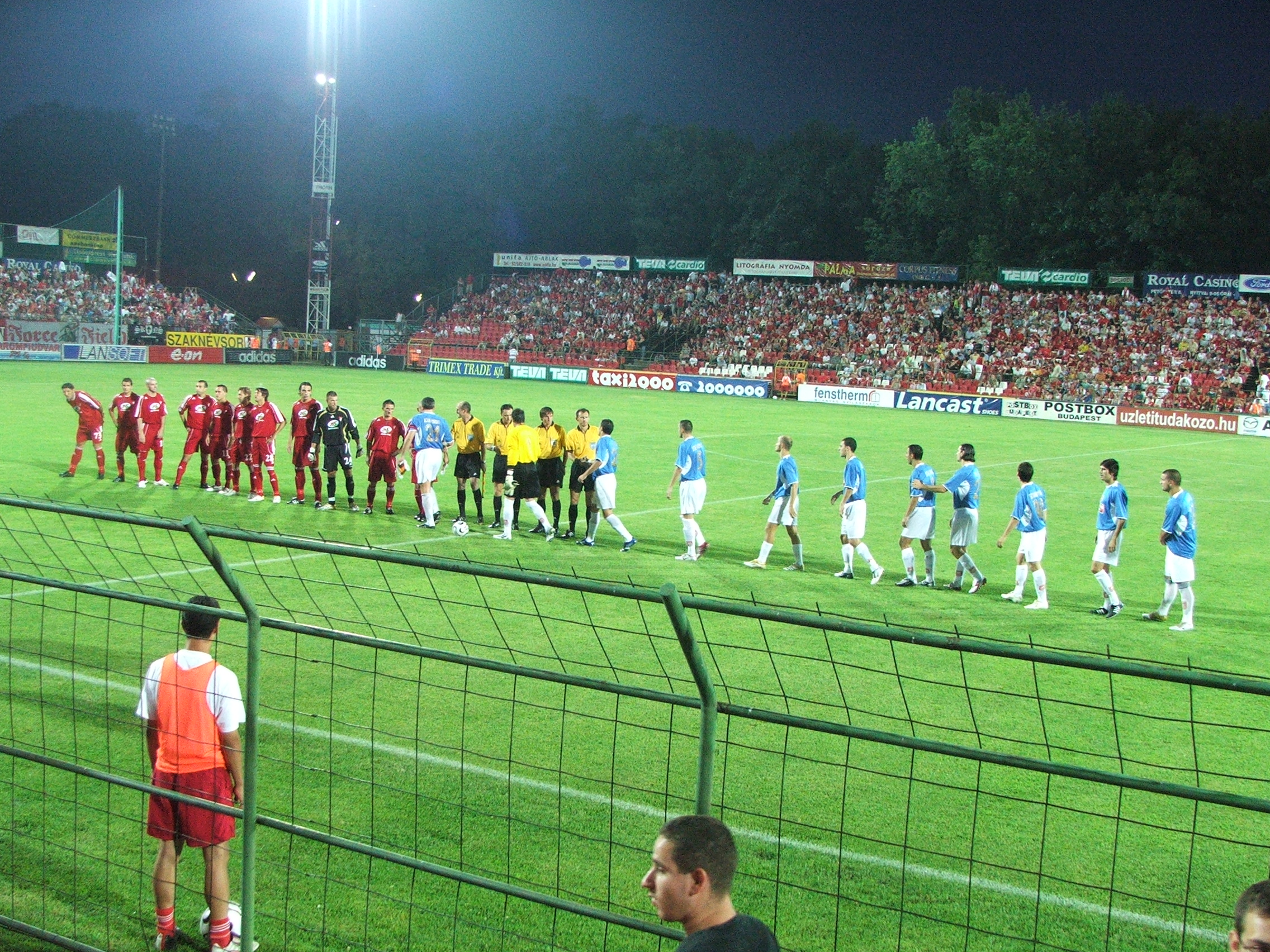
Debrecen played their home matches at Oláh Gábor utcai Stadion between 1989 and 2014

Debrecen played their home matches between 1989 and 2014 at the Oláh Gábor utcai Stadion, which has a capacity of 12,500. After winning the first Nemzeti Bajnokság I trophy, it was found that the stadium did not meet UEFA stadium criteria. Therefore, the most important UEFA Champions League and UEFA Europa League matches had to be played at the Ferenc Puskás Stadium as in 2009–10 UEFA Champions League group stage and the 2010–11 UEFA Europa League group stage.

On 1 May 2014, the Nagyerdei stadium was opened with an inauguration ceremony. Viktor Orbán, Hungarian prime minister, said that "the Hungarian spirit, the architects, the engineers, the workers make Hungary great again with this constructions like the Nagyerdei stadium" (in Hungarian: "A magyar szellem, a tervezők, a mérnökök, a munkások ilyen alkotásokkal teszik ismét naggyá Magyarországot"). The stadium was also sanctified by Nándor Bosák, bishop of the Roman Catholic Church, Gusztáv Bölcskei, minister, and Fülöp Kocsis, bishops of the Greek Catholic Church. After the sanctification, singers such as Lou Bega, Viktor Király, Ildikó Kersztes, Gigi Radić, and Erika Miklósa entertained the audience. The first match was played between the Debrecen All Stars and Hungary All Stars, including players such as Attila Pintér, current Hungary national football team coach, Kálmán Kovács, former Budapest Honvéd legend, Péter Lipcsei, former Ferencváros icon, György Véber, former Újpest icon and Mezőkövesd manager at that time, Imre Garaba, former Hungary international, Flórián Urbán, former Újpest legend, and Lajos Détári, former Hungary national team legend.

On 10 May 2014, the first official match was played at the new stadium between Debrecen and Újpest in the 2013–14 Hungarian League season. The match ended with a 3–1 victory over the Budapest-based rival, Újpest. The first goal of the match was scored by Kulcsár in the 27th minute. Although Vasiljević equalised the score in the 37th minute, Debrecen were able to clinch the victory in the second half due to an own goal by Antón in the 46-minute and a goal by Vadnai in the 85th minute.

On 22 May 2014, the first match of the Hungary national football team was played at the stadium in front of 20,000 spectators, which ended with a 2–2 draw against Denmark national football team. The first goal was scored by the former Debrecen player Dzsudzsák. Eriksen equalised the score in the 56th minute. The debutant Varga took the lead in the 69th minute again, but the score was equalised by Schöne in the 72nd minute.

== Supporters ==
Supporters of DVSC are mainly based in Debrecen, Hungary. However, the club is popular in all over Hungary. Club's main ultras group is Szívtiprók Ultras Debrecen (SZ.U.D.), which is the largest and oldest faction, founded in 1994. As of 2000, SZ.U.D started to divide itself, in factions of ultras outside Debrecen, such as SZ.U.D. Budapest, SZ.U.D. Nagyvárad and SZ.U.D. Hódmezővásárhely. Among smaller groups are considered Force Field, Red Territory and Vadmacskák, which are the oldest. However, since 2009, new ultras factions, such as Sziporkák, Debrecen Hooligans, Barrabrava Debrecen and others appeared. This while several, like North Side Hooligans were dissolved in early 2000s. Debrecen has fierce rivalries with Nyíregyháza, Békéscsaba and competitive rivalries with Ferencváros, Újpest and Videoton.

On 5 August 2014, UEFA issued sanctions against Debrecen, Romania's Steaua București and Slovenia's Maribor following racist behaviour by their fans during 2014–15 UEFA Champions League qualifying against Cliftonville, Strømsgodset and Zrinjski Mostar respectively. Debrecen shut sector B of their ground after fans showed an "illicit banner" during the match against Northern Ireland's Cliftonville.

- Szívtiprók Ultras Debrecen (founded in 1994)

Famous supporters

- (Hungary) László Lukács

== Ownership ==
On 27 May 2017, it was announced that Andy Vajna could replace Gábor Szima as the owner of Debrecen. Nevertheless, Andy Vajna added that he likes football but he does not want to invest into football.

On 15 August 2017, it was revealed that Gábor Szima, the owner of Debrecen, might leave the club and a Greek tycoon might arrive.

On 1 July 2020, Szima resigned as the owner of the club. The 73 percent of the shares of the club were purchased by the local government. László Papp, mayor of Debrecen, announced that the main goal is to be promoted to the first league again.

On 18 December 2020, it was announced that the DVSC Egyesület purchased the majority of the shares.

On 27 June 2022, Ike Thierry Zaengel was appointed as the chairman and owner of the club.

In 2025, the club's football team was managed for months by a temporary board of directors with a repeatedly extended mandate, after Five Eleven Capital, which purchased a minority stake in the club in the spring, failed to purchase additional shares from the club's current president, Ike Thierry Zaengel, despite a previous agreement, and thus did not become the majority owner. Due to the delayed change of ownership, Debrecen experienced liquidity problems in autumn 2025, needing help from the city of Debrecen in September 2025 to meet its financial obligations, according to a September statement by Mayor László Papp.

In October 2025, Nemzeti Sport reported that the group behind English third tier (EFL League One) club Stockport County might buy a stake in Debrecen. Negotiations were ongoing for several months, and it was reported that the English were personally present at several Debrecen matches in the fall, and the club's press department had previously acknowledged the ongoing negotiations. In January 2026, Stott Capital, the English investment firm owned by Stockport County owner and chairman Mark Stott, acquired a controlling stake in Debrecen. Stott said the two clubs will operate "entirely independently", describing Debrecen as "one of the country's most established clubs, with a proud history, a strong talent pipeline, and experience in European competition".

== Honours ==
=== Domestic ===
- Nemzeti Bajnokság I
  - Winners (7): 2004–05, 2005–06, 2006–07, 2008–09, 2009–10, 2011–12, 2013–14
  - Runners-up (1): 2007–08
- Nemzeti Bajnokság II
  - Winners (8): 1942–43 1948–49, 1959–60, 1961–62, 1978–79, 1988–89, 1992–93, 2020–21
  - Runners-up (3): 1941–42, 1957–58, 1983–84
- Nemzeti Bajnokság III
  - Winners (2): 1969, 2007–08
- Magyar Kupa
  - Winners (6): 1998–99, 2000–01, 2007–08, 2009–10, 2011–12, 2012–13
  - Runners-up (2): 2002–03, 2006–07
- Ligakupa
  - Winners (1): 2009–10
  - Runners-up (3): 2007–08, 2010–11, 2014–15
- Szuperkupa
  - Winners (5): 2005, 2006, 2007, 2009, 2010
  - Runners-up (4): 2008, 2012, 2013, 2014

==== Trebles ====
Winners of Nemzeti Bajnokság I, Magyar Kupa and Ligakupa

- 2009–10: Nemzeti Bajnokság I, Magyar Kupa, Ligakupa

Note: In addition, they also won the Szuperkupa (Super Cup) in 2010.

==== Doubles ====
Winners of Nemzeti Bajnokság I and Magyar Kupa

- 2011–12: Nemzeti Bajnokság I, Magyar Kupa

=== Record departures ===
Rank	Player	To	Fee	Year	Ref.
1.	(Hungary) Balázs Dzsudzsák	(Netherlands) PSV Eindhoven	€2.5 million (Note: Fee may eventually rise above €2.5 million.)	2008	
2.	(Hungary) Tamás Szűcs	(Portugal) Famalicao	€2.5 million (Note: Fee may eventually rise above €2.5 million.)	2026	
3.	(Hungary) Norbert Balogh	(Italy) Palermo	€2.2 million (Note: Fee may eventually rise above €2.2 million.)	2016	
4.	(Nigeria) Hamzat Ojediran	(France) Lens	€1.5 million (Note: Fee may eventually rise above €1.5 million.)	2024	
5.	(Hungary) Péter Baráth	(Hungary) Ferencváros	€1.2 million (Note: Fee may eventually rise above €1.2 million.)	2023	
6.	(Hungary) Tamás Sándor	(Italy) Torino	€1 million (Note: Fee may eventually rise above €1 million.)	1998	
7.	(Hungary) Kevin Varga	(Turkey) Kasimpasa	~€850,000	2020	
8.	(Hungary) Zsolt Laczkó	(Italy) Sampdoria	~€830,000	2011	
9.	(Hungary) Donát Bárány	(Netherlands) ADO Den Haag	~€800,000	2026	
10.	(Hungary) Dávid Holman	(Slovakia) Slovan Bratislava	~€700,000	2018	

== Seasons ==
=== League positions ===
As of 30 May 2026

- Between 1970–71 and 1973–74 the second tier league called NB I/B.

== Players ==
=== Current squad ===
As of 7 September 2026
Injured player

Note: Flags indicate national team as defined under FIFA eligibility rules; some limited exceptions apply. Players may hold more than one non-FIFA nationality.

No.	Pos.	Nation	Player
1	GK	BUL	Plamen Andreev
2	DF	HUN	Dénes Szakál
3	DF	ESP	Adrián Guerrero
4	DF	VEN	Josua Mejías
5	DF	HUN	Bence Batik (vice-captain)
6	MF	BIH	Blaž Bošković
8	FW	HUN	Leon Myrtaj
10	MF	HUN	Balázs Dzsudzsák (captain)
11	FW	HUN	Ákos Szendrei
12	GK	HUN	Benedek Erdélyi
15	MF	HUN	Dávid Patai
16	MF	ESP	Sergi Samper
18	MF	NGR	Kaye Shedrach
19	MF	HUN	Dominik Kocsis
20	MF	HUN	Máté Macsó
22	MF	HUN	Botond Vajda
23	DF	HUN	Gergő Tercza

No.	Pos.	Nation	Player
24	FW	HUN	Imre Egri
25	FW	FRA	Sohan Baldoni
26	DF	HUN	Ádám Lang
27	FW	HUN	Máté Kohut
28	DF	AUT	Maximilian Hofmann
29	DF	HUN	Erik Kusnyír
39	FW	MAD	Bryan Adinany (on loan from (Belgium) Kortrijk)
66	DF	GUI	Jocelyn Janneh
72	DF	ISR	Rotem Keller
75	MF	HUN	Dávid Patai
77	FW	HUN	Márk Szécsi
78	MF	HUN	Balázs Sain
89	GK	HUN	Dániel Póser
90	GK	HUN	Bálint Tuska
96	DF	FRA	Julien Dacosta
97	FW	HUN	Csanád Vilmos Dénes
99	MF	HUN	Flórián Cibla

=== Players with multiple nationalities ===
- (Hungary) (Ukraine) Erik Kusnyír

=== Out on loan ===
Note: Flags indicate national team as defined under FIFA eligibility rules; some limited exceptions apply. Players may hold more than one non-FIFA nationality.

No.	Pos.	Nation	Player
3	DF	HUN	Csaba Hornyák
10	MF	HUN	Mátyás Vidnyánszky
18	FW	NGR	Shedrach Kaye
45	FW	HUN	Tamás Batai
49	DF	UKR	Vyacheslav Kulbachuk
87	GK	HUN	Márk Engedi

=== B squad ===
No.	Pos.	Nation	Player
—	GK	HUN	Levente Szondi
—	GK	UKR	Dmytro Shakhanov
—	DF	HUN	Gergő Tercza
—	DF	HUN	Márk Tóth
—	DF	UKR	Roman Soroka
—	DF	HUN	Gábor Lénárt
—	DF	HUN	Árpád Mona
—	DF	HUN	Balázs Gellén
—	DF	HUN	Aurél Vaskó
—	DF	HUN	Elia Grassi
—	DF	HUN	István Rácz
—	DF	SVK	Barnabás Ferenczi
—	MF	UKR	Ivan Polozhyi
—	MF	HUN	Tamás Farkas

No.	Pos.	Nation	Player
—	MF	HUN	Bence Takács
—	MF	UKR	Daniil Brazhko
—	MF	HUN	Zalán Horváth
—	MF	HUN	Szabolcs Perpék
—	MF	HUN	Balázs Sain
—	MF	HUN	Flórián Cibla
—	MF	HUN	Dávid Patai
—	MF	HUN	Zsolt Doktor
—	FW	HUN	Dávid Jacsó
—	FW	HUN	Martin Bökönyi
—	FW	HUN	Gergő Regenyei
—	FW	HUN	Botond Nyikos
—	FW	HUN	Imre Egri

== Club officials ==
=== Board of directors ===
As of 26 October 2026

Position	Name
President	(England) Mark Stott
Member of the board of directors	(England) Simon Wilson
Managing Director	(Sweden) Fredrik Söderberg
Secretary general	(Hungary) Balázs Makray
Sporting director	(Hungary) Ádám Bogdán

=== Management ===
As of 5 June 2026

Position	Name
Head coach	(Estonia) Gert Remmel
Assistant coach	(Finland) Rasmus Jansson
Assistant coach	(Portugal) Ednardo Monterio
Assistant coach	(Hungary) Tibor Dombi
Goalkeeping coach	(Hungary) János Balogh
Goalkeeping coach	(Hungary) János Tuska
Head fitness coach	(Hungary) Ádám Száraz
Fitness coach	(Hungary) Zsolt Pallai
Video analyzer	(Hungary) Dávid Szalóczy

== Notable foreign players ==
- (Bulgaria) Ivo Georgiev
- (Bosnia and Herzegovina) Haris Handžić
- (Bosnia and Herzegovina) Haris Tabakovic
- (Brazil) Maurides
- (Bulgaria) Kristiyan Malinov
- (Cameroon) Dorge Kouemaha
- (Cameroon) Yannick Mbengono
- (Central African Republic) Amos Youga
- (Croatia) Sandro Tomić
- (Croatia) Ronald Habi
- (Croatia) Božidar Radošević
- (Croatia) Dajan Šimac
- (Estonia) Igor Morozov
- (France) Adamo Coulibaly
- (France) Selim Bouadla
- (France) Brandon Domingues
- (Georgia (country)) Kakhaber Chkhetiani
- (Greece) Alexandros Kyziridis
- (Honduras) Luis Ramos
- (Japan) Shūichi Gonda
- (North Macedonia) Aco Stojkov
- (North Macedonia) David Babunski
- (North Macedonia) Dorian Babunski
- (North Macedonia) Mirsad Mijadinoski
- (Montenegro) Bojan Brnović
- (Montenegro) Meldin Drešković
- (Montenegro) Dušan Lagator
- (Montenegro) Vukašin Poleksić
- (Nigeria) Hamzat Ojediran
- (Romania) Liviu Goian
- (Romania) Tibor Selymes
- (Romania) Nicolae Ilea
- (Romania) Marius Șumudică
- (Romania) Sabin Ilie
- (Senegal) Ibrahima Sidibe
- (Serbia) Igor Bogdanović
- (Serbia) Dragan Vukmir
- (Serbia) Nenad Novaković
- (Serbia) Dušan Brković
- (Slovakia) Róbert Vittek
- (Slovenia) Dalibor Volaš
- (Slovenia) Rene Mihelič
- (South Korea) Suk Hyun-jun
- (Ukraine) Oleksandr Romanchuk
- (Venezuela) Frank Feltscher

== See also ==
- Debreceni VSC in European football
- History of Debreceni VSC
- List of Debreceni VSC managers
- List of Debreceni VSC records and statistics
- List of Debreceni VSC seasons
