= Rasmus Jansson =

Finnish football coach (born 1997)

Personal information
- Date of birth: 17 March 1997 (age 29)
- Place of birth: Finland

Team information
- Current team: Debrecen (assistant); Bosnia and Herzegovina (video analyst)

Youth career
- Years: Team
- SAPA

Managerial career
- 2019: SAPA
- 2020: EsPa
- 2020: Pafos (youth)
- 2021: Pafos (video analyst)
- 2021–2022: Pafos (assistant)
- 2022: NK Novigrad (assistant)
- 2023: JS Hercules
- 2023: Miedź Legnica U19
- 2024–2026: Motor Lublin (assistant)
- 2024–: Bosnia and Herzegovina (video analyst)
- 2026–: Debrecen (assistant)

Rasmus Jansson (born 17 March 1997) is a Finnish football coach who is currently an assistant coach of Nemzeti Bajnokság I club Debrecen and a video analyst for the Bosnia and Herzegovina national team.
