= Dominik Kocsis =

Hungarian footballer (born 2002)

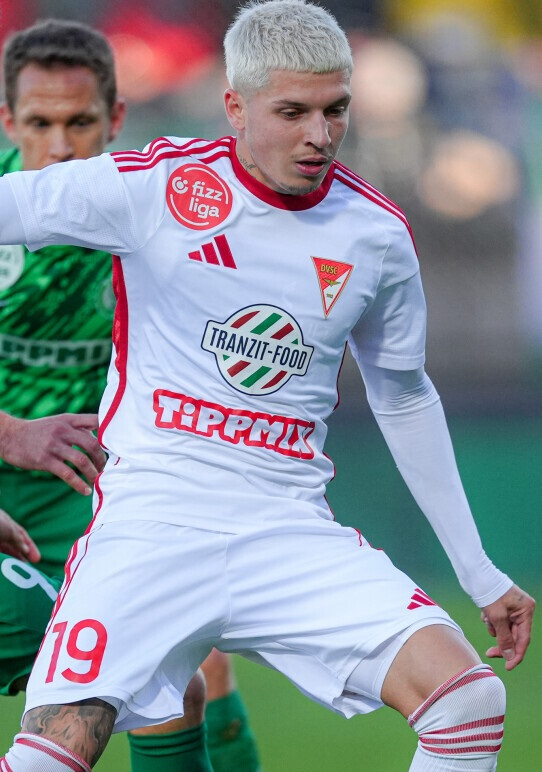
- Kocsis playing for Debrecen in 2025

Personal information
- Date of birth: 1 August 2002 (age 24)
- Place of birth: Nagykanizsa, Hungary
- Height: 1.75 m (5 ft 9 in)
- Position: Winger

Team information
- Current team: Debrecen
- Number: 19

Youth career
- 2009–2014: Nagykanizsa
- 2014–2020: Budapest Honvéd

Senior career*
Years	Team	Apps	(Gls)
2020–2024	Budapest Honvéd	57	(3)
2021–2022	→ Diósgyőr (loan)	24	(1)
2024–	Debrecen	51	(5)

International career^{‡}
2022–	Hungary U21	12	(3)
- * Club domestic league appearances and goals as of 30 May 2026 ‡ National team caps and goals as of 17 November 2023

Dominik Kocsis (born 1 August 2002) is a Hungarian professional footballer who plays as a winger for Nemzeti Bajnokság I club Debrecen.

== Club career ==
On 19 August 2021, Kocsis joined Diósgyőr on a season-long loan.

On 31 January 2024, Kocsis signed with Debrecen.

== Career statistics ==
As of 15 May 2021.

Appearances and goals by club, season and competition
Club	Season	League			Cup		Continental		Other		Total	
Club	Season	Division	Apps	Goals	Apps	Goals	Apps	Goals	Apps	Goals	Apps	Goals
Budapest Honvéd	2020–21	Nemzeti Bajnokság I	9	0	2	0	0	0	—		11	0
Budapest Honvéd	Total		9	0	2	0	0	0	0	0	11	0
Career total			9	0	2	0	0	0	0	0	11	0
