= 2025–26 Debreceni VSC season =

Debrecen
2025–26 season
- Chairman: Ike Thierry Zaengel
- Manager: Sergio Navarro (From 17 June 2025)
- Stadium: Nagyerdei Stadion
- Nemzeti Bajnokság I: 4th
- Magyar Kupa: Round of 32
- Top goalscorer: League: Bárány (12); All: Bárány (13)
- Highest home attendance: 16,876 (v Ferencváros, Nemzeti Bajnokság, R28, 5 April 2026)
- Lowest home attendance: 3,514 (v Kazincbarcika, Nemzeti Bajnokság, R14, 22 November 2025)
- Average home league attendance: 7,215
- Biggest win: 5 goals, (5–0) v Diósgyőr (A), Nemzeti Bajnokság, R30, 18 April 2026
- Biggest defeat: 3 goals, (0–3) v Ferencváros (H), Nemzeti Bajnokság, R6, 31 August 2025
- All statistics correct as of 16 May 2026 (completed).

The 2025–26 season is Debreceni Vasutas Sport Club's 47th competitive season, 5th consecutive season in the Nemzeti Bajnokság I and 123rd year in existence as a football club. In addition to the Nemzeti Bajnokság I (domestic league), Debrecen participated in this season's editions of the Magyar Kupa (domestic cup).

Fizz Liga (domestic league)

Debrecen finished in 4th place and can start in second qualifying round of the 2026-27 European Conference League.

Magyar Kupa (domectic cup)

In the domestic cup (Magyar Kupa) Debrecen joined the competition in the Round of 64 and advanced to the top 32 by defeating against third-division (Nemzeti Bajnokság III) VSC 2015 Veszprém 2–0 away. In the Round of 32, they lost 2–1 at home after extra time against second division (Nemzeti Bajnokság II) Budapest Honvéd.

== Kits ==
Supplier: Adidas / Sponsor: Tranzit-Food / Tippmix / Short sponsor: Tippmix

Kits using Adidas's Three Stripes trademark
| Home | Home alt. | Away | Third |

| Goalkeeper^{1} | Goalkeeper^{2} | Goalkeeper^{3} |

== First team squad ==
As of 27 February 2026

Note: Flags indicate national team as defined under FIFA eligibility rules; some limited exceptions apply. Players may hold more than one non-FIFA nationality.

| No. | Pos. | Nation | Player |
|---|---|---|---|
| 1 | GK | HUN | Patrik Demjén |
| 2 | DF | HUN | Dénes Szakál |
| 3 | DF | ESP | Adrián Guerrero |
| 4 | DF | VEN | Josua Mejías |
| 5 | DF | HUN | Bence Batik |
| 6 | MF | ESP | Víctor Camarasa |
| 8 | MF | HUN | Tamás Szűcs |
| 10 | MF | HUN | Balázs Dzsudzsák (captain) |
| 11 | FW | HUN | György Komáromi (on loan from (Slovenia) Maribor) |
| 12 | GK | HUN | Bendek Erdélyi |
| 13 | MF | HUN | Soma Szuhodovszki |
| 14 | MF | SRB | Đorđe Gordić (on loan from (Belgium) Lommel) |
| 16 | MF | ESP | Fran Manzanara |
| 17 | FW | HUN | Donát Bárány |
| 19 | MF | HUN | Dominik Kocsis |
| 20 | MF | CAF | Amos Youga |
| 21 | FW | HUN | Gergő Regenyei |

| No. | Pos. | Nation | Player |
|---|---|---|---|
| 22 | MF | HUN | Botond Vajda |
| 23 | DF | HUN | Gergő Tercza |
| 24 | FW | HUN | Imre Egri |
| 26 | DF | HUN | Ádám Lang |
| 28 | DF | AUT | Maximilian Hofmann |
| 29 | DF | HUN | Erik Kusnyír |
| 42 | FW | CIV | Yacouba Silue |
| 44 | FW | NGR | David Nwachukwu |
| 49 | DF | UKR | Vyacheslav Kulbachuk |
| 76 | MF | UKR | Iván Polozhyi |
| 77 | FW | HUN | Márk Szécsi (vice-captain) |
| 86 | GK | HUN | Donát Pálfi |
| 90 | FW | NGR | Stephen Odey |
| 95 | MF | ESP | Álex Bermejo |
| 96 | DF | FRA | Julien Dacosta |
| 99 | MF | HUN | Flórián Cibla |

== Transfers ==
=== Summer ===
In
| Date | No. | Pos. | Nat. | Player | Moving from | Fee | Ref. |
|---|---|---|---|---|---|---|---|
| 24 June 2025 | 16 | MF | Spain | Fran Manzanara | Racing Ferrol | Undisclosed | |
| 1 July 2025 | 4 | DF | Venezuela | Josua Mejías | Athens Kallithea | Free agent | |
| 8 July 2025 | 96 | DF | France | Julien Dacosta | Sochaux | Undisclosed | |
| 18 July 2025 | 3 | DF | Spain | Adrián Guerrero | Tenerife | Free agent | |
| 24 July 2025 | 95 | MF | Spain | Álex Bermejo | Farense | Free agent | |
| 28 July 2025 | 49 | DF | Ukraine | Vyacheslav Kulbachuk | Džiugas Telšiai | Undisclosed | |
| 15 August 2025 | 74 | FW | Mali | Pape Sissoko | Reims | Undisclosed | |
| 26 August 2025 | TBD | FW | Spain | Erik Vázquez | Real Madrid U19 | Free agent | |

Loaned from
| Date | No. | Pos. | Nat. | Player | Moving from | Until | Ref. |
|---|---|---|---|---|---|---|---|
| 9 July 2025 | 1 | GK | Hungary | Ádám Varga | Ferencváros | 30 June 2026 | |
| 17 July 2025 | 14 | MF | Serbia | Đorđe Gordić | Lommel S.K. | 30 June 2026 | |
| 2 August 2025 | 90 | FW | Switzerland | Dejan Djokic | Sion | 30 June 2026 | |
| 4 August 2025 | 11 | FW | Hungary | György Komáromi | Maribor | 30 June 2026 | |

New contracts
| Date | No. | Pos. | Nat. | Player | Moving from | Until | Ref. |
|---|---|---|---|---|---|---|---|
| 1 July 2025 | | MF | Hungary | Balázs Bodnár | DVSC Academy | N/A | |
| 1 July 2025 | | FW | Hungary | Gergő Regenyei | DVSC Academy | N/A | |
| 1 July 2025 | | DF | Hungary | Dénes Szakál | DVSC Academy | N/A | |
| 1 July 2025 | | DF | Hungary | Gergő Tercza | DVSC Academy | N/A | |

Returned back after loan expired
| Date | No. | Pos. | Nat. | Player | Return to | Ref. |
|---|---|---|---|---|---|---|
| 30 June 2025 | 47 | GK | Hungary | Krisztián Hegyi | West Ham United | |

Out
| Date | No. | Pos. | Nat. | Player | Moving to | Fee | Ref. |
|---|---|---|---|---|---|---|---|
| 18 June 2025 | 16 | GK | Hungary | Balázs Megyeri | Győri ETO | Contracts expire, Free | |
| 18 June 2025 | 57 | GK | Japan | Shūichi Gonda | Vissel Kobe | Contracts expire, Free | |
| 18 June 2025 | 27 | DF | Hungary | Gergő Kocsis | Videoton (NB II) | Contracts expire, Free | |
| 18 June 2025 | 30 | DF | Serbia | Aranđel Stojković | TBD | Contracts expire, Free | |
| 18 June 2025 | 25 | FW | Brazil | Maurides | Radomiak Radom | Contracts expire, Free | |
| 18 June 2025 | 15 | DF | Sweden | Henrik Castegren | Sirius | Mutual of agreement | |
| 18 June 2025 | 33 | MF | Bulgaria | Kristiyan Malinov | Botev Vratsa | Mutual of agreement | |
| 19 June 2025 | 11 | DF | Hungary | János Ferenczi | Csíkszereda | Contracts expire, Free | |
| 24 June 2025 | 99 | MF | France | Brandon Domingues | Real Oviedo | Undisclosed | |
| 18 August 2025 | 6 | MF | Croatia | Neven Đurasek | TBD | Mutual agreement | |
| 18 August 2025 | 4 | DF | Albania | Jorgo Pëllumbi | TBD | Mutual agreement | |

Out on loan
| Date | No. | Pos. | Nat. | Player | Moving to | Loan date | Ref. |
|---|---|---|---|---|---|---|---|
| 1 July 2025 | 10 | MF | Hungary | Mátyás Vidnyánszky | Mezőkövesd (NB II) | 30 June 2026 | |
| 1 July 2025 | 3 | DF | Hungary | Csaba Hornyák | Mezőkövesd (NB II) | 30 June 2026 | |
| 1 July 2025 | 18 | FW | Nigeria | Shedrach Kaye | Karcag (NB II) | 30 June 2026 | |
| 1 July 2025 | 45 | FW | Hungary | Tamás Batai | | 30 June 2026 | |
| 1 July 2025 | 84 | GK | Hungary | Márk Engedi | Tiszakécske (NB II) | 30 June 2026 | |
| 1 July 2025 | | FW | Hungary | Máté Kohut | Karcag (NB II) | 30 June 2026 | |
| 1 July 2025 | | MF | Hungary | Balázs Sain | Karcag (NB II) | 30 June 2026 | |

=== Winter ===
In
| Date | No. | Pos. | Nat. | Player | Moving from | Fee | Ref. |
|---|---|---|---|---|---|---|---|
| 28 January 2026 | 1 | GK | Hungary | Patrik Demjén | MTK Budapest | Undisclosed | |
| 27 February 2026 | 90 | FW | Nigeria | Stephen Odey | Randers | Undisclosed | |

Returned back after loan expired
| Date | No. | Pos. | Nat. | Player | Return to | Ref. |
|---|---|---|---|---|---|---|
| 8 January 2026 | 74 | FW | Mali | Pape Sissoko | Reims | |
| 16 February 2026 | 90 | FW | Switzerland | Dejan Djokic | Sion | |

=== Contract renewals ===
| Date | No. | Pos. | Nat. | Player | Extension to | Ref. |
|---|---|---|---|---|---|---|
| 24 July 2025 | 10 | MF | Hungary | Balázs Dzsudzsák (c) | 30 June 2026 | |
| 11 December 2025 | 17 | FW | Hungary | Donát Bárány | 30 June 2027 | |
| 10 January 2026 | 8 | MF | Hungary | Tamás Szűcs | 30 June 2029 | |
| 24 April 2026 | 12 | GK | Hungary | Bendek Erdélyi | 30 June 2029 | |
| 30 April 2026 | 17 | FW | Hungary | Donát Bárány | 30 June 2029 | |

=== Managerial changes ===
| Outgoing manager | Manner of departure | Date of vacancy | Position in table | Incoming manager | Date of appointment | Ref. |
|---|---|---|---|---|---|---|
| Nestor El Maestro | Mutual agreement | 14 June 2025 | Pre-season | 17 June 2025 | Sergio Navarro | |

^{c} = Caretaker

== Friendlies ==
Win Draw Loss Fixtures

=== Pre-season ===
DVSC started the preparation for the 2025/26 season at 18 June, 2025.

Summer training camp in Waidhofen an der Ybbs, Austria, from 22 June 2025.

| 25 June 2025 Friendly | Csíkszereda (Romanian I) (Romania) | 0–1 | Debrecen | Sankt Leonhard am Forst, Austria |
| 18:00 CEST (UTC+02:00) | | Report | Silue 63'; Nwachukwu (penalty missed) 82' |
Note: • DVSC: Pálfi — M. Szécsi, Lang, Szakál, B. Vajda — T. Szűcs, B. Bodnár — D. Kocsis, Dzsudzsák, Egri — Bárány • Substituions: T. Balogh (GK), Engedi (GK), Gyenti, Asztalos, Fábián, Grassi, Hornyák, Doktor, Cibla, Nyikos, Shedrach, Nwachukwu, Bökönyi, Batai, Silue • Manager: Navarro

| 30 June 2025 Friendly | CFR Cluj (Romanian I) (Romania) | 2–0 | Debrecen | Austria |
| 18:00 CEST (UTC+02:00) | Emërllahu 17'; Kamara 64' | Report |
Note: • DVSC 1st half: Erdélyi — M. Szécsi (Gyenti (substituted on) 39'), Lang, Szakál, B. Vajda, T. Szűcs, Manzanara, Youga, D. Kocsis, Dzsudzsák, Bárány • DVSC 2nd half: Pálfi — Gyenti, Fábián, Mona, Grassi, Egri, Asztalos, B. Bodnár, Nwachukwu, Nyikos, Batai • Substitutions: Engedi (GK), Tercza, Doktor, Bökönyi, Shedrach, Silue • Manager: Navarro

| 4 July 2025 Friendly | Olomouc (Czech I) (Czech Republic) | 3–1 | Debrecen | Austria |
| 16:00 CEST (UTC+02:00) | Breite 12'; Vasulin 20'; Janosek 44' (pen.) | Report | Nwachukwu 24' |
Note: • DVSC: Pálfi — Gyenti, Mejias, Szakál, Hornyák, B. Vajda, Manzanara, T. Szűcs, Nwachukwu, Egri, Batai • Substitutions: Erdélyi (GK), Engedi (GK), Batik, Lang, Fábián, Cibla, B. Bodnár, Mona, D. Kocsis, Shedrach, Dzsudzsák, Bárány, Silue, Tercza • Manager: Navarro

| 12 July 2025 Friendly | Debrecen | 1–4 | (Slovakia) Košice (Slovak I) | Debrecen-Pallag |
| 17:30 CEST (UTC+02:00) | Regenyei 85' | Report | Madleňák 39'; Magda 42'; Kružliak 63' (pen.); Miljanić 67' | Stadium: Academy Training Center; Attendance: 0 (behind closed doors) |
Note: • DVSC: Á. Varga — Tercza, Lang, Mejias, Hornyák, B. Vajda, Cibla, Dzsudzsák, Manzanara, T. Szűcs, Batai • Substitutions: Pálfi (GK), Gyenti, Szakál, D. Kocsis, Regenyei, Batik, Nwachukwu, Egri, B. Bodnár, Patai • Manager: Navarro

| 16 July 2025 Friendly | Debrecen | 5–2 | (Hungary) DEAC (Nemzeti Bajnokság III) | Debrecen-Pallag |
| | Bárány 15' (pen.), 20', 26'; Nwachukwu 60'; Regenyei 62' | Report | G. Lénárt 6'; Al-Sheraji 64' | Stadium: Academy Training Center; Attendance: 0 (behind closed doors) |
Note: 2×35 minutes playing time • DVSC: Erdélyi — Dacosta, Batik, Mejias, Hornyák, Szuhodovszki, Gordić, Dzsudzsák, D. Kocsis, Nwachukwu, Bárány • Substitutions: Pálfi (GK), Tercza, Gyenti, Asztalos, Egri, Cibla, Regenyei, B. Bodnár, Batai, Silue • Manager: Navarro

| 19 July 2025 Friendly | Debrecen | 2–0 | (Romania) Satu Mare (Romanian II) | Debrecen-Pallag |
| 17:00 CEST (UTC+02:00) | Bárány 58'; Regenyei 80' | Report | | Stadium: Academy Training Center; Attendance: 0 (behind closed doors) |
Note: • DVSC: Á. Varga — Dacosta, Mejias, Lang, Tercza, Manzanara, T. Szűcs, Gordić, Szuhodovszki, D. Kocsis, Bárány • Substitutions: Dzsudzsák, Hornyák, Szakál, Batik, Gyenti, B. Bodnár, Asztalos, Cibla, Egri, Regenyei • Manager: Navarro

=== Mid-season ===
| 8 October 2025 Friendly | Debrecen | 1–1 | (Hungary) Karcag (Nemzeti Bajnokság II) | Debrecen |
| | Manzanara 28' | Report | Székely 72' | Stadium: Nagyerdei Stadion; Attendance: 0 (behind closed doors) |
Note: • Debrecen: Pálfi — M. Szécsi, Manzanara, Kulbachuk, Cibla, Camarasa, Gordić, Komáromi, Szuhodovszki, Bermejo, Sissoko • Substitutions: Tercza, Dacosta, Silue, Asztalos • Manager: Navarro

Winter training camp in Belek, Turkey, from 6 January 2026.

| 11 January 2026 Friendly | Crvena zvezda (Serbian I) (Serbia) | 3–1 | Debrecen | Belek, Turkey |
| 15:00 | Duarte 17'; Lučić 32', 43' | Report | D. Kocsis 60' |
Note: • Debrecen: Pálfi — M. Szécsi, Mejias, Szakál, Guerrero — Camarasa, T. Szűcs — Komáromi, Dzsudzsák, Bermejo — Bárány • Substitutions: Erdélyi (GK), Gordić, Patai, Manzanara, D. Kocsis, Youga, B. Vajda, Tercza, Kusnyír, Asztalos, Kulbachuk, Kohut, Cibla • Manager: Navarro

| 15 January 2026 Friendly | OFK Beograd (Serbian I) (Serbia) | 2–1 | Debrecen | Belek, Turkey |
| 15:00 | 1'; 84' | Report | Bárány 61' (pen.) |
Note: • Debrecen: Erdélyi — Tercza, Mejias, Kulbachuk, B. Vajda — Camarasa, Youga — Komáromi, Dzsudzsák, Gordić — Kohut • Substitutions: Pálfi (GK), Engedi (GK), Szakál, Guerrero, T. Szűcs, Patai, Manzanara, Bárány, Kusnyír, Silue, M. Szécsi, Bermejo, Dacosta, Cibla • Manager: Navarro

| 19 January 2026 Friendly | Maribor (Slovenian I) (Slovenia) | 2–3 | Debrecen | Belek, Turkey |
| 15:00 | Reghba 76'; Pejičić 88' | Report | Dzsudzsák 30' (pen.); Bermejo 34'; Silue 71' |
Note: • Debrecen: Erdélyi — Kusnyír, Mejias, Kulbachuk, B. Vajda — T. Szűcs, Youga — Cibla, Dzsudzsák, Bermejo, Bárány • Substitutions: Pálfi (GK), Engedi (GK), Szakál, Komáromi, Gordić, Patai, Manzanara, D. Kocsis, Kohut, Silue, M. Szécsi, Guerrero • Manager: Navarro

== Competitions ==
=== Overall record ===
In italics, we indicate the Last match and the Final position achieved in competition(s) that have not yet been completed.

| Competition | First match | Last match | Starting round | Final position | Record | | | | | | | |
| Competition | First match | Last match | Starting round | Final position | Pld | W | D | L | GF | GA | GD | Win % |
|---|---|---|---|---|---|---|---|---|---|---|---|---|
| Nemzeti Bajnokság I | 26 July 2025 | 16 May 2026 | Matchday 1 | 4th | 33 | 14 | 11 | 8 | 51 | 41 | +10 | 42.42 |
| Magyar Kupa | 13 September 2025 | 30 October 2025 | Round of 64 | Round of 32 | 2 | 1 | 0 | 1 | 3 | 2 | +1 | 50.00 |
| Total | | | | | 35 | 15 | 11 | 9 | 54 | 43 | +11 | 42.86 |

Last updated: complete
Source: Soccerway

=== Nemzeti Bajnokság I ===
==== League table ====
| Pos | Team | Pld | W | D | L | GF | GA | GD | Pts | Qualification or relegation |
|---|---|---|---|---|---|---|---|---|---|---|
| 2 | Ferencváros | 33 | 21 | 5 | 7 | 67 | 31 | +36 | 68 | Qualification for the Europa League first qualifying round (Note: The 2025–26 Magyar Kupa winners (Ferencváros) qualify for the Europa League first qualifying round.) |
| 3 | Paks | 33 | 15 | 8 | 10 | 63 | 46 | +17 | 53 | Qualification for the Conference League second qualifying round |
| 4 | Debrecen | 33 | 14 | 11 | 8 | 51 | 41 | +10 | 53 | Qualification for the Conference League second qualifying round |
| 5 | Zalaegerszeg | 33 | 13 | 9 | 11 | 49 | 43 | +6 | 48 | |
| 6 | Puskás Akadémia | 33 | 13 | 7 | 13 | 43 | 43 | 0 | 46 | |

Source: Hungarian Football Federation (in Hungarian)
Rules for classification: 1) Points; 2) Matches won; 3) Goal difference; 4) Goals scored; 5) Head-to-head points; 6) Head-to-head goal difference; 7) Fair play ranking; 8) Drawing of lots.

==== Results summary ====
| Overall | | | | | | | | Home | | | | | | Away | | | | | |
| Pld | W | D | L | GF | GA | GD | Pts | W | D | L | GF | GA | GD | W | D | L | GF | GA | GD |
|---|---|---|---|---|---|---|---|---|---|---|---|---|---|---|---|---|---|---|---|
| 33 | 14 | 11 | 8 | 51 | 41 | +10 | 53 | 7 | 4 | 5 | 22 | 21 | +1 | 7 | 7 | 3 | 29 | 20 | +9 |

Last updated: 16 May 2026.
Source: Soccerway

==== Matches ====
Win Draw Loss Fixtures Postponed

The draw for the 2025/26 season was held on 16 June 2025.

| 26 July 2025 1 | Zalaegerszeg | 3–3 | Debrecen | Zalaegerszeg |
| 17:45 CEST | Dénes 23'; Papp (yellow card) 42'; João Victor 45+6'; B. Kiss (yellow card) 45+3'; Skribek 71' | Report | Szuhodovszki (yellow card) 6'; Bárány (penalty missed) 42' 67', 89'; Dzsudzsák 44'; D. Kocsis (yellow card) 68' | Stadium: ZTE Arena; Attendance: 2,844; Referee: Mihály Káprály; Assistant referees: Balázs Szalai, Zoltán Horváth |
Note: • Debrecen: Á. Varga — Dacosta (Tercza (substituted on) 74'), Mejias (Regenyei (substituted on) 87'), Lang, Batik — B. Vajda, T. Szűcs, Dzsudzsák (c) (M. Szécsi (substituted on) 64'), Szuhodovszki (Gordić (substituted on) 64'), D. Kocsis (Bermejo (substituted on) 74') — Bárány • Manager: Navarro • Player of the match: João Victor, Zalaegerszeg 8.4 • Best player of Debrecen: Balázs Dzsudzsák 8.2

| 1 August 2025 2 | Debrecen | 1–0 | MTK | Debrecen |
| 20:00 CEST | Batik 56' (yellow card) 78'; Á. Varga (yellow card) 89'; T. Szűcs (yellow card) 90+4'; Bermejo (yellow card) 90+6' | Report | P. Kovács (yellow card) 39'; H. Németh (yellow card) 53' | Stadium: Nagyerdei Stadion; Attendance: 6,233; Referee: Ferenc Karakó; Assistant referees: Dániel Szalai, József Aradi |
Note: • Debrecen: Á. Varga — Dacosta (Gordić (substituted on) 80'), Lang, Mejias, Guerrero — Batik, T. Szűcs — D. Kocsis (Tercza (substituted on) 80'), Dzsudzsák (c) (M. Szécsi (substituted on) 64'), Szuhodovszki (Bermejo (substituted on) 64') — Bárány (Cibla (substituted on) 90+2') • Manager: Navarro • Player of the match: Ádám Varga, Debrecen 9.1 • Best player of MTK: Mihály Kata 7.8

| 8 August 2025 3 | Kazincbarcika | 1–2 | Debrecen | Mezőkövesd |
| 20:00 CEST | Haroyan 46'; Gyollai (yellow card) 63'; Könyves (yellow card) 78' | Report | D. Kocsis (yellow card) 23'; M. Szécsi 19' (yellow card) 54'; Dzsudzsák (yellow card) 54' (goal) 65' (pen.) | Stadium: Városi Stadion; Attendance: 1,349; Referee: Bence Hanyecz; Assistant referees: Balázs Szalai, Bence Belicza |
Note: • Debrecen: Á. Varga — Dacosta (Tercza (substituted on) 87'), Lang, Mejias, Guerrero — Batik, T. Szűcs — D. Kocsis (Gordić (substituted on) 70'), Dzsudzsák (c) (Manzanara (substituted on) 75'), M. Szécsi (Komáromi (substituted on) 69') — Bárány (Djokic (substituted on) 87') • Manager: Navarro • Player of the match: Varazdat Haroyan, Kazincbarcika 8.1 • Best player of Debrecen: Márk Szécsi 7.5

| 17 August 2025 4 | Debrecen | 1–2 | Nyíregyháza | Debrecen |
| 15:30 CEST | T. Szűcs 16' (yellow card) 90+2'; Gordić (yellow card) 43'; Batik (yellow card) 81'; Djokic (yellow card) 89' | Report | Jokić (yellow card) 33'; Edomwonyi 47'; Evangelou (yellow card) 81' (goal) 90'; Alaxai (yellow card) 82' | Stadium: Nagyerdei Stadion; Attendance: 12,626; Referee: Tamár Bognár; Assistant referees: Vencel Tóth II, Péter Kóbor |
Note: • Debrecen: Á. Varga — M. Szécsi, Hofmann, Mejias (Manzanara (substituted on) 73'), Guerrero (B. Vajda (substituted on) 45+2') — Batik, T. Szűcs — D. Kocsis, Dzsudzsák (c) (Kulbachuk (substituted on) 73'), Gordić (Bermejo (substituted on) 65') — Bárány (Djokic (substituted on) 65') • Manager: Navarro • Player of the match: Tamás Szűcs, Debrecen 8.3 • Best player of Nyíregyháza: Aboubakar Keita 7.8

| 22 August 2025 5 | Puskás Akadémia | 1–3 | Debrecen | Felcsút |
| 20:00 CEST | Lukács 62'; Favorov (yellow card) 56' | Report | Dzsudzsák 45' (yellow card) 78'; Batik (yellow card) 63'; T. Szűcs 86'; Kulbachuk 90+1' | Stadium: Pancho Aréna; Attendance: 1,896; Referee: Péter Zierkelbach; Assistant referees: Gergő Vígh-Tarsonyi, József Aradi |
Note: • Debrecen: Á. Varga — M. Szécsi (Manzanara (substituted on) 90+2'), Lang, Hofmann, Kulbachuk — Batik, T. Szűcs — D. Kocsis (Komáromi (substituted on) 83'), Dzsudzsák (c (Mejias (substituted on) 90+2'), Gordić (Bermejo (substituted on) 68') — Bárány • Manager: Navarro • Player of the match: Tamás Szűcs, Debrecen 8.5 • Best player of Puskás Akadémia: Dániel Lukács 7.7

| 31 August 2025 6 | Debrecen | 0–3 | Ferencváros | Debrecen |
| 20:00 CEST | T. Szűcs (yellow card) 46'; M. Szécsi (yellow card) 69'; Lang (yellow card) 78' | Report | B. Varga 14', 40'; Gruber 88' | Stadium: Nagyerdei Stadion; Attendance: 10,674; Referee: Márton Rúsz; Assistant referees: István Albert, Gergő Vígh-Tarsonyi |
Note: • Debrecen: Á. Varga — Mejias, Lang, Hofmann (B. Vajda (substituted on) 46'), Kulbachuk — T. Szűcs (Cibla (substituted on) 85'), Batik — M. Szécsi (Gordić (substituted on) 71'), Dzsudzsák (c) (Djokic (substituted on) 71'), D. Kocsis — Bárány (Sissoko (substituted on) 85') • Manager: Navarro • Player of the match: Barnabás Varga, Ferencváros 8.6 • Best player of Debrecen: Donát Bárány and Botond Vajda 6.9 each

| 21 September 2025 7 | Kisvárda | 0–1 | Debrecen | Kisvárda |
| 17:45 CEST | Mešanović (yellow card) 86' | Report | Bárány 81' | Stadium: Várkerti Stadion; Attendance: 2,710; Referee: Tamás Bognár; Assistant referees: Balázs Buzás, Péter Kóbor |
Note: • Debrecen: Á. Varga — M. Szécsi, Lang, Mejias, Guerrero — T. Szűcs, Youga (B. Vajda (substituted on) 68') — D. Kocsis (Komáromi (substituted on) 79'), Dzsudzsák (c) (Kulbachuk (substituted on) 90+1'), Bermejo (Manzanara (substituted on) 68') — Bárány (Djokic (substituted on) 90+1') • Manager: Navarro • Player of the match: Adrián Guerrero, Debrecen 7.9 • Best player of Kisvárda: Martin Chlumecký 7.5

| 27 September 2025 8 | Diósgyőr | 0–0 | Debrecen | Miskolc |
| 17:30 CEST | Šaponjić (yellow card) 32'; Demeter (yellow card) 34' | Report | | Stadium: Diósgyőri Stadion; Attendance: 6,279; Referee: Bence Csonka dr. Assistant referees: Balázs Buzás, Péter Garai |
Note: • Debrecen: Á. Varga — Dacosta (M. Szécsi (substituted on) 89'), Lang, Mejias, Guerrero (B. Vajda (substituted on) 77') — Youga, T. Szűcs — D. Kocsis (Komáromi (substituted on) 77'), Dzsudzsák (c), Bermejo (Szuhodovszki (substituted on) 64') — Bárány • Manager: Navarro • Player of the match: Álex Vallejo, Diósgyőr 7.7 • Best player of Debrecen: Josua Mejías 7.5

| 4 October 2025 9 | Debrecen | 1–1 | Győri ETO | Debrecen |
| 19:30 CEST | Mejias (yellow card) 26'; Youga (yellow card) 48'; Dzsudzsák 49' | Report | Benbouali (yellow card) 22'; Štefulj (yellow card) 48'; Anton 66' (pen.) | Stadium: Nagyerdei Stadion; Attendance: 5,077; Referee: Ferenc Karakó; Assistant referees: Balázs Szalai, Dániel Szalai |
Note: • Debrecen: Á. Varga — Dacosta (M. Szécsi (substituted on) 82'), Lang, Mejias, Guerrero — Youga, T. Szűcs — D. Kocsis (Batik (substituted on) 82'), Dzsudzsák (c), B. Vajda (Gordić (substituted on) 72') — Bárány (Sissoko (substituted on) 90+2') • Manager: Navarro • Player of the match: Balázs Dzsudzsák, Debrecen 8.4 • Best player of Győri ETO: Paul Anton 8.2

| 18 October 2025 10 | Paks | 1–1 | Debrecen | Paks |
| 16:15 CEST | Ke. Horváth (yellow card) 32'; Hahn 50' | Report | Guerrero 56'; Mejias (yellow card) 90+3'; Lang (yellow card) 90+5' | Stadium: Fehérvári úti Stadion; Attendance: 3,504; Referee: Márton Rúsz; Assistant referees: Ákos Berényi, Viktor Nagy |
Note: • Debrecen: Á. Varga — M. Szécsi (Dacosta (substituted on) 80'), Lang, Mejias, Guerrero — Batik — D. Kocsis (Bermejo (substituted on) 66'), Dzsudzsák (c) (Youga (substituted on) 90+1'), T. Szűcs (Cibla (substituted on) 90+1'), Szuhodovszki (Komáromi (substituted on) 66') — Bárány • Manager: Navarro • Player of the match: János Hahn, Paks 8.2 • Best player of Debrecen: Ádám Varga 7.6

| 26 October 2025 11 | Debrecen | 5–2 | Újpest | Debrecen |
| 15:00 CET | Bárány 8', 30'; Youga 15'; Lang (yellow card) 45'; Cibla 56'; D. Kocsis 59' | Report | Medeiros 64' (pen.); Lacoux 74' (yellow card) 74'; Gonçalves (yellow card) 89' | Stadium: Nagyerdei Stadion; Attendance: 6,647; Referee: Ferenc Karakó; Assistant referees: Balázs Szalai, Zoltán Horváth |
Note: • Debrecen: Á. Varga — M. Szécsi, Mejias, Lang, Guerrero (B. Vajda (substituted on) 46') — T. Szűcs, Youga (Manzanara (substituted on) 68') — D. Kocsis (Gordić (substituted on) 68'), Dzsudzsák (c) (Szuhodovszki (substituted on) 61'), Cibla — Bárány (Sissoko (substituted on) 61') • Manager: Navarro • Player of the match: Dominik Kocsis, Debrecen 8.9 • Best player of Újpest: Krisztofer Horváth 7.8

| 2 November 2025 12 | Debrecen | 2–1 | Zalaegerszeg | Debrecen |
| 18:00 CET | Bárány 17'; D. Kocsis 31'; Hofmann (yellow card) 49'; Youga (yellow card) 90+3' | Report | Maxsuell (yellow card) 47'; Skribek 90+5' | Stadium: Nagyerdei Stadion; Attendance: 4,344; Referee: Bence Hanyecz; Assistant referees: Norbert Bornemissza, Bence Belicza |
Note: • Debrecen: Á. Varga — M. Szécsi (c), Hofmann (Lang (substituted on) 58'), Mejias, B. Vajda — T. Szűcs (Manzanara (substituted on) 82'), Youga — D. Kocsis, Gordić (Cibla (substituted on) 69'), Szuhodovszki (Dzsudzsák (substituted on) 69') – Bárány (Sissoko (substituted on) 82') • Manager: Navarro • Player of the match: Josua Mejías, Debrecen 8.3 • Best player of Zalaegerszeg: Alen Skribek 7.8

| 9 November 2025 13 | MTK | 3–0 | Debrecen | Budapest |
| 12:45 CET | Átrok 38'; Bognár 43'; Á. Molnár 59'; Kata (yellow card) 72'; Kerezsi (yellow card) 83' | Report | M. Szécsi (yellow card) 12'; Dacosta (yellow card) 54'; Dzsudzsák (yellow card) 59'; Youga (yellow card) 85' | Stadium: Hidegkuti Nándor Stadion; Attendance: 3,894; Referee: Attila Molnár; Assistant referees: István Albert, István Szécsényi |
Note: • Debrecen: Á. Varga — M. Szécsi (Dacosta (substituted on) 46'), Mejias, Lang, Guerrero (Gordić (substituted on) 53') — Youga — D. Kocsis (Bermejo (substituted on) 74'), Dzsudzsák (c), T. Szűcs (Cibla (substituted on) 74'), B. Vajda — Bárány (Djokic (substituted on) 53') • Manager: Navarro • Player of the match: István Átrok, MTK 9.0 • Best player of Debrecen: Balázs Dzsudzsák 8.1

| 22 November 2025 14 | Debrecen | 2–1 | Kazincbarcika | Debrecen |
| 17:00 CET | Cibla (yellow card) 48'; Dzsudzsák 50'; Komáromi 78' | Report | Haroyan (yellow card) 33'; Szőke (yellow card) 43'; Kártik 72' (pen.) | Stadium: Nagyerdei Stadion; Attendance: 3,514; Referee: Péter Antal; Assistant referees: Gergely Becséri, Dávid Rózsa |
Note: • Debrecen: Á. Varga — Dacosta, Mejias, Lang, Guerrero (Manzanara (substituted on) 89') — T. Szűcs, Youga (Batik (substituted on) 66') — D. Kocsis (Komáromi (substituted on) 46'), Dzsudzsák (c), Cibla (B. Vajda (substituted on) 66') — Szuhodovszki (Sissoko (substituted on) 82') • Manager: Navarro • Player of the match: Balázs Dzsudzsák, Debrecen 8.3 • Best player of Kazincbarcika: Bálint Kártik 7.5

| 28 November 2025 15 | Nyíregyháza | 0–3 | Debrecen | Nyíregyháza |
| 20:00 CET | M. Kovács (yellow card) 90+2' | Report | Szuhodovszki 6' (yellow card) 48'; Gordić 21'; Manzanara (yellow card) 72'; D. Kocsis 82' (yellow card) 82'; Youga (yellow card) 88' | Stadium: Városi Stadion; Attendance: 7,232; Referee: Gergő Bogár; Assistant referees: Péter Garai, Ákos Berényi |
Note: • Debrecen: Á. Varga — Dacosta (M. Szécsi (substituted on) 85'), Lang, Batik, B. Vajda (Guerrero (substituted on) 85') — T. Szűcs (Cibla (substituted on) 22'), Youga — D. Kocsis (Komáromi (substituted on) 85'), Dzsudzsák (c), Gordić (Manzanara (substituted on) 64') — Szuhodovszki • Manager: Navarro • Player of the match: Ádám Varga, Debrecen 8.7 • Best player of Nyíregyháza: Bendegúz Farkas 7.2

| 6 December 2025 16 | Debrecen | 0–1 | Puskás Akadémia | Debrecen |
| 14:45 CET | Batik (yellow card) 52'; Cibla (yellow card) 73' | Report | Lukács (yellow card) 24'; Zs. Nagy 37'; Favorov (yellow card) 40'; Szolnoki (yellow card) 49'; Markgráf (yellow card) 52'; Szappanos (yellow card) 54' | Stadium: Nagyerdei Stadion; Attendance: 4,767; Referee: Péter Zierkelbach; Assistant referees: István Albert, Bence Belicza |
Note: • Debrecen: Á. Varga — Dacosta (M. Szécsi (substituted on) 74'), Batik, Lang, B. Vajda — Youga (Sissoko (substituted on) 84'), Cibla — D. Kocsis (Komáromi (substituted on) 74'), Dzsudzsák (c), Gordić (Bárány (substituted on) 62') — Szuhodovszki • Manager: Navarro • Player of the match: Balázs Dzsudzsák, Debrecen 8.1 • Best player of Puskás Akadémia: Dániel Lukács 8.0

| 14 December 2025 17 | Ferencváros | 0–1 | Debrecen | Budapest |
| 14:45 CET | Romão (yellow card) 34'; B. Varga (yellow card) 90+1' | Report | Bárány 74'; Youga (yellow card) 89' | Stadium: Ferencváros Stadion; Attendance: 10,657; Referee: Balázs Berke; Assistant referees: Vencel Tóth II, Georgiou Theodoros |
Note: • Debrecen: Á. Varga — Dacosta, Mejias, Lang, Guerrero — T. Szűcs, Batik — D. Kocsis (Bermejo (substituted on) 74'), Dzsudzsák (c) (Komáromi (substituted on) 74'), Gordić (Youga (substituted on) 89') — Szuhodovszki (Bárány (substituted on) 10') • Manager: Navarro • Player of the match: Donát Bárány, Debrecen 7.6 • Best player of Ferencváros: Toon Raemaekers 7.6

| 21 December 2025 18 | Debrecen | 0–1 | Kisvárda | Debrecen |
| 17:30 CET | Lang (yellow card) 74'; Komáromi (yellow card) 86'; D. Kocsis (red card) 87' (On the bench); Mejias (yellow card) 90+5' | Report | Yordanov 55'; K. Nagy (yellow card) 79'; Chlumecký (yellow card) 90+5' | Stadium: Nagyerdei Stadion; Attendance: 5,133; Referee: Márton Rúsz; Assistant referees: Norbert Bornemissza, Dániel Szalai |
Note: • Debrecen: Á. Varga — Dacosta (Sissoko (substituted on) 84'), Lang (Camarasa (substituted on) 84'), Mejias, B. Vajda (Guerrero (substituted on) 75') — T. Szűcs, Batik — D. Kocsis (Bermejo (substituted on) 75'), Dzsudzsák (c), Gordić (Komáromi (substituted on) 64') — Bárány • Manager: Navarro • Player of the match: Tonislav Yordanov, Kisvárda 7.7 • Best player of Debrecen: Bence Batik 7.5

| 25 January 2026 19 | Debrecen | 3–2 | Diósgyőr | Debrecen |
| 13:00 CET | Kulbachuk (yellow card) 11'; Cibla 45+1'; Kusnyír 49'; T. Szűcs 56'; Manzanara (yellow card) 90' | Report | Colley 15' (yellow card) 65'; Bokros 19'; Bárdos (yellow card) 78' | Stadium: Nagyerdei Stadion; Attendance: 3,902; Referee: Gergő Bogár; Assistant referees: Balázs Buzás, Bence Belicza |
Note: • Debrecen: Erdélyi — Kusnyír, Mejias, Kulbachuk (Hoffmann (substituted on) 74'), B. Vajda (Guerrero (substituted on) 74') — T. Szűcs, Youga — Gordić (Komáromi (substituted on) 66'), Dzsudzsák (c) (Manzanara (substituted on) 86'), Cibla (Szuhodovszki (substituted on) 74') — Bárány • Manager: Navarro • Player of the match: Erik Kusnyír, Debrecen 8.2 • Best player of Diósgyőr: Lamin Colley 7.8

| 31 January 2026 20 | Győri ETO | 2–2 | Debrecen | Győr |
| 16:00 CET | Csinger (yellow card) 19'; Gavrić (yellow card) 54'; Vitális 65' (pen.), 90+3' (pen.); Krpić (yellow card) 69' | Report | Szuhodovszki 38'; Komáromi 50'; B. Vajda (yellow card) 64'; Mejias (yellow card) 72'; Gordić (yellow card) 87' | Stadium: ETO Park; Attendance: 5,059; Referee: Márton Rúsz; Assistant referees: Péter Garai, Ákos Berényi |
Note: • Debrecen: Erdélyi — Guerrero (B. Vajda (substituted on) 52'), Lang, Mejias, Kusnyír — T. Szűcs, Youga — Komáromi (Gordić (substituted on) 84'), Dzsudzsák (c) (Batik (substituted on) 84'), Cibla (Bermejo (substituted on) 68') — Szuhodovszki (Bárány (substituted on) 68') • Manager: Navarro (yellow card) (yellow-red card) 90+10' • Player of the match: Milán Vitális, Győri ETO 9.3 • Best player of Debrecen: Soma Szuhodovszki 7.9

| 7 February 2026 21 | Debrecen | 1–0 | Paks | Debrecen |
| 14:45 CET | Bárány 50'; Batik (yellow card) 76'; Szuhodovszki (yellow card) 84' | Report | Ádám (yellow card) 90' | Stadium: Nagyerdei Stadion; Attendance: 4,743; Referee: Balázs Berke; Assistant referees: Péter Kóbor, Dávid Rózsa |
Note: • Debrecen: Erdélyi — Kusnyír, Mejias, Lang, B. Vajda — Batik, T. Szűcs — Komáromi (M. Szécsi (substituted on) 90+3'), Dzsudzsák (c) (Youga (substituted on) 79'), Cibla (Szuhodovszki (substituted on) 66') — Bárány (Bermejo (substituted on) 79') • Interim manager: Pallares • Player of the match: Josua Mejías, Debrecen 8.1 • Best player of Paks: Bence Lenzsér 7.4

| 13 February 2026 22 | Újpest | 2–1 | Debrecen | Budapest |
| 20:00 CET | Matko 15', 64' (yellow card) 44'; Vlijter (yellow card) 37' | Report | T. Szűcs (yellow card) 40' (yellow-red card) 55'; Youga 67'; Komáromi (yellow card) 75' | Stadium: Szusza Ferenc Stadion; Attendance: 4,279; Referee: Gergő Bogár; Assistant referees: István Albert, Zoltán Horváth |
Note: • Debrecen: Erdélyi — Kusnyír (M. Szécsi (substituted on) 80'), Mejias, Lang, B. Vajda (Cibla (substituted on) 89') — T. Szűcs, Youga (Komáromi (substituted on) 70') — Szuhodovszki (Manzanara (substituted on) 70'), Dzsudzsák (c), Bermejo (Gordić (substituted on) 70') — Bárány • Interim manager: Pallares • Player of the match: Gleofilo Vlijter, Újpest 8.4 • Best player of Debrecen: Amos Youga 8.2

| 22 February 2026 23 | Zalaegerszeg | 1–1 | Debrecen | Zalaegerszeg |
| 14:45 CET | Peraza 24' (yellow card) 27'; Calderón (yellow card) 40'; B. Kiss (yellow card) 85' | Report | Szuhodovszki (yellow card) 54'; Guerrero 65'; Gordić (yellow card) 66'; Mejias (yellow card) 83'; Bárány (yellow card) 89' | Stadium: ZTE Arena; Attendance: 3,521; Referee: Péter Zierkelbach; Assistant referees: Péter Kóbor, Péter Ország |
Note: • Debrecen: Erdélyi — Kusnyír (M. Szécsi (substituted on) 86'), Lang, Hofmann, Guerrero — Komáromi (D. Kocsis (substituted on) 60'), Gordić, Batik, Dzsudzsák (c) (Patai (substituted on) 86'), Cibla (Bárány (substituted on) 60') — Szuhodovszki (B. Vajda (substituted on) 73') • Manager: Navarro • Player of the match: Norbert Szendrei, Zalaegerszeg 7.8 • Best player of Debrecen: Adrián Guerrero 7.1

| 27 February 2026 24 | Debrecen | 2–2 | MTK | Debrecen |
| 20:15 CET | Lang (yellow card) 49'; Batik (yellow card) 51'; Bárány 59', 69'; Youga (yellow card) 90+1' | Report | Jurina (yellow card) 37'; H. Németh 75'; Kerezsi 76' | Stadium: Nagyerdei Stadion; Attendance: 4,012; Referee: Mihály Káprály; Assistant referees: Dániel Szalai, Ákos Berényi |
Note: • Debrecen: Erdélyi — Kusnyír, Hofmann (Youga (substituted on) 46'), Lang, Guerrero — Batik, T. Szűcs — Gordić (Cibla (substituted on) 74'), Dzsudzsák (c), D. Kocsis (Szuhodovszki (substituted on) 74') — Bárány • Manager: Navarro • Player of the match: Tamás Szűcs, Debrecen 8.2 • Best player of MTK: Hunor Németh 7.7

| 8 March 2026 25 | Kazincbarcika | 0–3 | Debrecen | Miskolc |
| 17:45 CET | Berecz (yellow card) 35'; Radkowski (yellow card) 64' | Report | Gordić 23'; Batik (yellow card) 31'; Bárány 68'; Hoffmann (yellow card) 72'; Youga (yellow card) 75'; Dzsudzsák 81' | Stadium: Diósgyőri Stadion; Attendance: 929; Referee: Marcell Derdák; Assistant referees: József Aradi, Viktor Nagy |
Note: • Debrecen: Erdélyi — Kusnyír (Tercza (substituted on) 87'), Batik, Hofmann, B. Vajda (Komáromi (substituted on) 77') — T. Szűcs, Youga — D. Kocsis (Kulbachuk (substituted on) 77'), Dzsudzsák (c) (Patai (substituted on) 84'), Gordić (Camarasa (substituted on) 84') — Bárány • Manager: Navarro • Player of the match: Balázs Dzsudzsák, Debrecen 8.0 • Best player of Kazincbarcika: Bence Trencsényi 7.5

| 14 March 2026 26 | Debrecen | 1–1 | Nyíregyháza | Debrecen |
| 19:30 CET | Bárány (yellow card) 43'; Dzsudzsák (yellow card) 45+3'; Gordić 77'; Batik (yellow card) 77'; D. Kocsis (yellow card) 79' | Report | Temesvári 57' (yellow card) 77'; Edomwonyi (yellow card) 86' | Stadium: Nagyerdei Stadion; Attendance: 10,884; Referee: Tamás Bognár; Assistant referees: Péter Kóbor, Georgiou Theodoros |
Note: • Debrecen: Erdélyi — Kusnyír, Mejias, Lang, Guerrero — T. Szűcs, Batik — D. Kocsis (Komáromi (substituted on) 73'), Dzsudzsák (c), Gordić — Bárány • Manager: Navarro • Player of the match: Attila Temesvári, Nyíregyháza 7.9 • Best player of Debrecen: Đorđe Gordić 7.6

| 22 March 2026 27 | Puskás Akadémia | 1–1 | Debrecen | Felcsút |
| 14:30 CET | Lukács 30'; A. Németh (yellow card) 46'; Lukács (yellow card) 87' | Report | Bárány 24' (pen.); Gordić (yellow card) 43'; Mejias (yellow card) 56'; Lang (yellow card) 90+3' | Stadium: Pancho Aréna; Attendance: 1,600; Referee: Ferenc Karakó; Assistant referees: Vencel Tóth II, Zoltán Horváth |
Note: • Debrecen: Erdélyi — Kusnyír, Mejias (Hofmann (substituted on) 80'), Lang, B. Vajda (Guerrero (substituted on) 64') — Batik, T. Szűcs — D. Kocsis (Manzanara (substituted on) 89'), Dzsudzsák (c) (Szuhodovszki (substituted on) 64'), Gordić (Komáromi (substituted on) 80') — Bárány • Manager: Navarro • Player of the match: Benedek Erdélyi, Debrecen 8.1 • Best player of Puskás Akadémia: Dániel Lukács 7.3

| 5 April 2026 28 | Debrecen | 0–2 | Ferencváros | Debrecen |
| 17:00 CEST | | Report | Corbu 53', 60'; Szalai (yellow card) 59'; Abu Fani (yellow card) 63' | Stadium: Nagyerdei Stadion; Attendance: 16,876; Referee: Gergő Bogár; Assistant referees: Vencel Tóth II, Balázs Szert |
Note: • Debrecen: Erdélyi — Kusnyír (Tercza (substituted on) 88'), Mejias, Lang, B. Vajda — T. Szűcs, Youga (Cibla (substituted on) 66') — D. Kocsis (Patai (substituted on) 76'), Dzsudzsák (c) (Odey (substituted on) 76'), Gordić — Szuhodovszki (Komáromi (substituted on) 66') • Manager: Navarro • Player of the match: Marius Corbu, Ferencváros 8.7 • Best player of Debrecen: Tamás Szűcs 7.1

| 13 April 2026 29 | Kisvárda | 0–0 | Debrecen | Kisvárda |
| 20:00 CEST | Matanović (yellow card) 9'; Be. Bíró (yellow card) 69' | Report | B. Vajda (yellow card) 88' | Stadium: Várkerti Stadion; Attendance: 1,951; Referee: Balázs Berke; Assistant referees: István Albert, Tibor Csatári |
Note: • Debrecen: Erdélyi — Kusnyír, Mejias, Lang, B. Vajda — T. Szűcs, Batik (Manzanara (substituted on) 62') — D. Kocsis, Dzsudzsák (c) (Camarasa (substituted on) 69'), Gordić (Komáromi (substituted on) 69') — Szuhodovszki • Manager: Navarro • Player of the match: Dominik Kocsis, Debrecen 7.7 • Best player of Kisvárda: Ridwan Popoola 7.6

| 18 April 2026 30 | Diósgyőr | 0–5 | Debrecen | Miskolc |
| 19:30 CEST | | Report | Szatmári 35' (o.g.); Cibla 39', 90'; Tamás 52' (o.g.); D. Kocsis 79' | Stadium: Diósgyőri Stadion; Attendance: 3,555; Referee: Marcell Derdák; Assistant referees: Péter Kóbor, Dávid Rózsa |
Note: • Debrecen: Demjén — Dacosta, Mejias (M. Szécsi (substituted on) 74'), Lang, B. Vajda (Guerrero (substituted on) 50') — D. Kocsis, Youga (Manzanara (substituted on) 74') — Dzsudzsák (c) (Patai (substituted on) 60'), T. Szűcs, Cibla — Szuhodovszki (Camarasa (substituted on) 60') • Manager: Navarro • Player of the match: Flórián Cibla, Debrecen 9.4 • Best player of Diósgyőr: Lamin Colley 7.2

| 26 April 2026 31 | Debrecen | 1–1 | Győri ETO | Debrecen |
| 19:30 CEST | Mejias (yellow card) 44'; Cibla 73'; Gordić (yellow card) 82'; Guerrero (yellow card) 87' | Report | Gavrić (yellow card) 35'; Vitális 39'; Vlădoiu (yellow card) 78' | Stadium: Nagyerdei Stadion; Attendance: 6,544; Referee: Ferenc Karakó; Assistant referees: Gergő Vígh-Tarsonyi, Balázs Szert |
Note: • Debrecen: Demjén — Kusnyír, Mejias, Lang, Guerrero (Tercza (substituted on) 89') — D. Kocsis (Komáromi (substituted on) 72'), Gordić (Camarasa (substituted on) 89'), T. Szűcs, Cibla (Patai (substituted on) 89') — Dzsudzsák (c) (Manzanara (substituted on) 72'), Szuhodovszki • Manager: Navarro • Player of the match: Milán Vitális, Győri ETO 7.8 • Best player of Debrecen: Flórián Cibla 7.6

| 3 May 2026 32 | Paks | 5–2 | Debrecen | Paks |
| 13:30 CEST | Ke. Horváth 5' (pen.) (yellow card) 47'; M. Szekszárdi (yellow card) 18'; Hahn (yellow card) 23'; Böde 25' (yellow card) 42'; Windecker 66'; Silye 70'; Zeke 90+5' | Report | Lang 7' (yellow card) 60'; Guerrero 44'; Mejias (yellow card) 55'; Manzanara (yellow card) 89'; T. Szűcs (yellow card) 90+4' | Stadium: Fehérvári úti Stadion; Attendance: 3,437; Referee: Tamás Bognár; Assistant referees: Bence Belicza, Dániel Szalai |
Note: • Debrecen: Erdélyi — Kusnyír, Mejias, Lang (Komáromi (substituted on) 77'), Guerrero (Tercza (substituted on) 77') — T. Szűcs, Batik — D. Kocsis, Dzsudzsák (c) (Manzanara (substituted on) 77'), Patai (M. Szécsi (substituted on) 65') — Szuhodovszki (Kohut (substituted on) 85') • Manager: Navarro • Player of the match: Márió Zeke, Paks 8.2 • Best player of Debrecen: Adrián Guerrero 6.8

| 16 May 2026 33 | Debrecen | 2–1 | Újpest | Debrecen |
| 17:15 CEST | Mejias 11' (yellow card) 15'; Komáromi 45+1' (yellow card) 79'; Batik (yellow card) 90+4' | Report | Fenyő (yellow card) 38'; Ademi (yellow card) 53'; Matko (yellow card) 79' (goal) 86' (pen.); Gradišar (yellow card) 90+3' | Stadium: Nagyerdei Stadion; Attendance: 9,444; Referee: Gergő Bogár; Assistant referees: István Albert, József Aradi |

=== Magyar Kupa ===
| 13 September 2025 R64 | VSC 2015 Veszprém (NB III) | 0–2 | Debrecen | Veszprém |
| 15:00 CEST | Dobsa (yellow card) 46'; Molnár (yellow card) 59'; Baldauf (yellow card) 76'; Somogyi (yellow card) 81' | Report | Komáromi 35'; Bárány 63' (pen.); Szakál (yellow card) 83' | Stadium: Egyetemi Stadion; Attendance: 600; Referee: Tamás Sipos; Assistant referees: Kevin Ring, Levente Balla |
Note: • Debrecen: Á. Varga — Tercza, Lang (Camarasa (substituted on) 76'), Hofmann, B. Vajda — Manzanara (Szakál (substituted on) 76'), Batik (Cibla (substituted on) 70') — Komáromi (Sissoko (substituted on) 65'), Szuhodovszki, Bermejo — Bárány (c) (Djokic (substituted on) 65') • Manager: Navarro

| 30 October 2025 R32 | Debrecen | 1–2 (a.e.t.) | Budapest Honvéd (NB II) | Debrecen |
| 20:00 CET | Dzsudzsák 22' (yellow card) 75'; Gordić (yellow card) 96' | Report | Kántor (yellow card) 46'; Pauljević 55'; B. Varga (yellow card) 96'; Pinte (yellow card) 109'; Zuigéber 117' (yellow card) 119'; Baki (yellow card) 119' | Stadium: Nagyerdei Stadion; Attendance: 4,412; Referee: Tamás Bognár; Assistant referees: Péter Kóbor, Péter Ország |
Note: • Debrecen: Á. Varga — Dacosta, Lang, Kulbachuk (Hofmann (substituted on) 101'), Guerrero — T. Szűcs (Camarasa (substituted on) 65'), Manzanara (Youga (substituted on) 84') — Komáromi (D. Kocsis (substituted on) 77'), Dzsudzsák (c), Bermejo (Gordić (substituted on) 77') — Bárány (Djokic (substituted on) 65') • Manager: Navarro

== See also ==
- List of Debreceni VSC seasons
