= Tamás Szűcs (footballer, born 2005) =

Hungarian footballer (born 2005)

Personal information
- Date of birth: 16 January 2005 (age 21)
- Place of birth: Debrecen, Hungary
- Height: 1.77 m (5 ft 10 in)
- Position: Midfielder

Team information
- Current team: Famalicão
- Number: 21

Youth career
- Hajdúszoboszló
- Hajdúböszörmény
- 2018–2022: Honvéd
- 2022–2024: Copenhagen

Senior career*
Years	Team	Apps	(Gls)
2024–2025	Copenhagen	0	(0)
2024–2025	→ Debrecen (loan)	17	(1)
2025–2026	Debrecen	45	(5)
2026–	Famalicão	2	(0)

International career^{‡}
2021	Hungary U17	10	(2)
2022–2023	Hungary U19	6	(1)
2024–	Hungary U21	11	(1)
2026–	Hungary	8	(0)
- * Club domestic league appearances and goals as of 30 August 2026 ‡ National team caps and goals as of 7 October 2026

Tamás Szűcs (born 16 January 2005) is a Hungarian international footballer who plays as a midfielder for Primeira Liga club Famalicão and the Hungary national team.

== Career ==
=== Debrecen ===
On 16 January 2025, he was signed by Nemzeti Bajnokság I club Debreceni VSC.

In an interview with Nemzeti Sport, he said that his best coach has been Sergio Navarro, while he was playing for Debrecen.

=== Famalicão ===
On 16 June 2026, he was signed by Primeira Liga club F.C. Famalicão. He signed a contract until 2031. In an interview with Nemzeti Sport, he said that "“I first heard about the Portuguese club’s interest around the end of March or the beginning of April,” Tamás Szűcs told our newspaper in response to our question. “Around that time, at the end of March, I made my debut with the Hungarian national team against Slovenia, and a few days later I also played in the match against Greece. It was during those days that my agent, Mátyás Esterházy, mentioned that this club would like me to play for them. To be honest, I didn’t give it much thought because the end of the season was still a long way off; I was trying with all my might to focus on Loki and make sure we finished the season with the best possible results. Then, as the season came to an end, there were two more national team matches—against Finland and Kazakhstan, the latter of which was actually in Debrecen—and after that, we talked about it a lot more. But I didn’t have to think about it for long…”

== Career statistics ==
=== Club ===
As of match played 16 May 2026

Appearances and goals by club, season and competition
Club	Season	League			National cup (Note: Includes Magyar Kupa)		Europe		Other		Total	
Club	Season	Division	Apps	Goals	Apps	Goals	Apps	Goals	Apps	Goals	Apps	Goals
Copenhagen	2024–25	Danish Superliga	0	0	0	0	—		—		0	0
Debrecen (loan)	2024–25	Nemzeti Bajnokság I	17	1	2	0	—		—		19	1
Debrecen	2024–25	Nemzeti Bajnokság I	14	2	—		—		—		14	2
Debrecen	2025–26	Nemzeti Bajnokság I	31	3	1	0	—		—		32	3
Debrecen	Total		45	5	1	0	—		—		46	5
Career total			61	6	3	0	0	0	0	0	65	6

=== International ===
As of match played 5 October 2026

Appearances and goals by national team and year
National team	Year	Apps	Goals
Hungary	2026	8	0
Total		8	0
