= Julien Dacosta =

French footballer (born 1996)

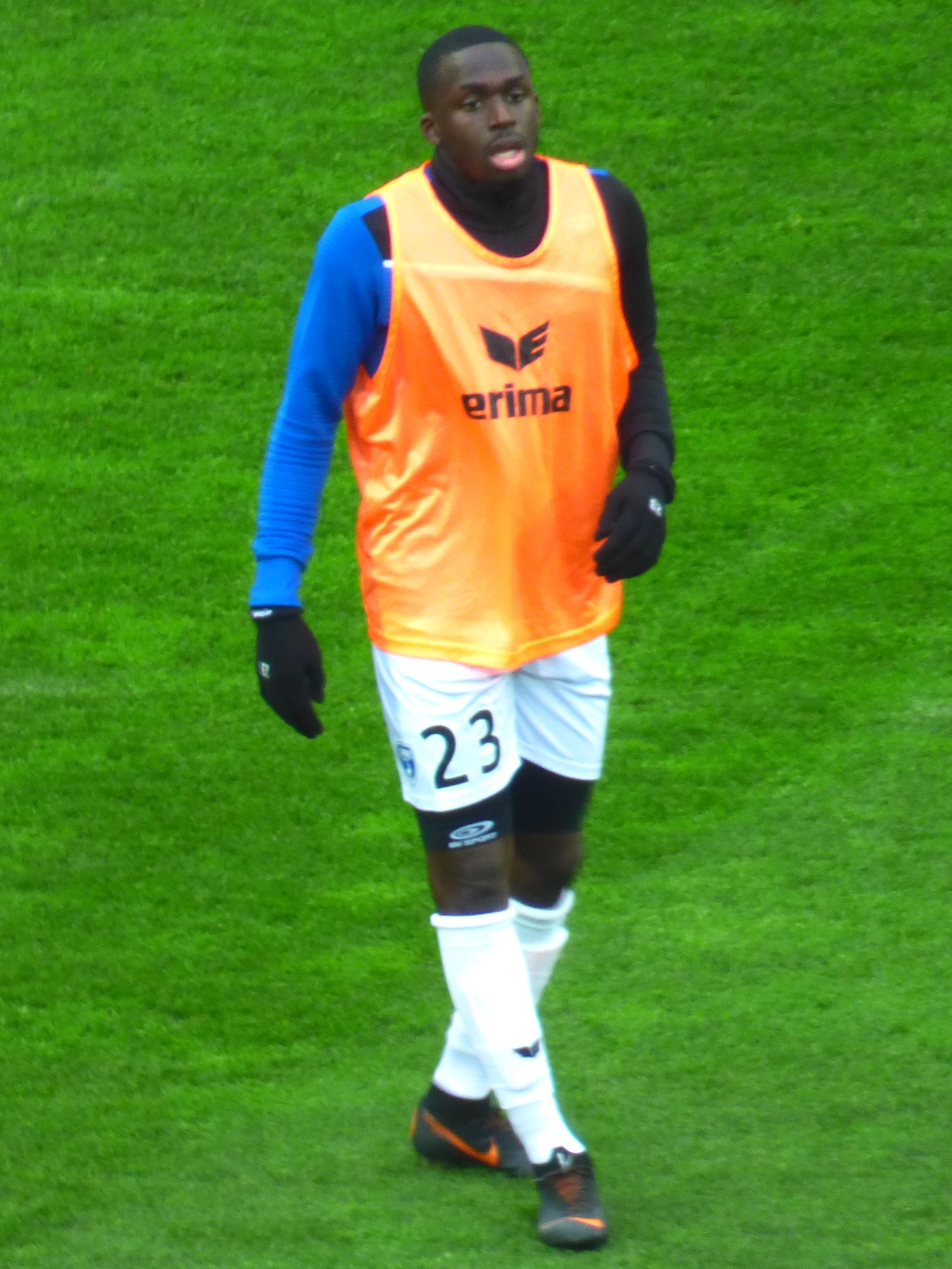

Personal information
- Full name: Julien Joachim Dacosta
- Date of birth: 29 May 1996 (age 30)
- Place of birth: Marseille, France
- Height: 1.82 m (6 ft 0 in)
- Positions: Right back; right wing-back

Team information
- Current team: Debreceni VSC
- Number: 96

Youth career
- 2011–2017: Marseille

Senior career*
Years	Team	Apps	(Gls)
2015–2017	Marseille II	46	(1)
2017–2020	Chamois Niortais	75	(0)
2017–2020	Chamois Niortais II	3	(0)
2020–2023	Coventry City	22	(0)
2022	→ Portimonense (loan)	11	(0)
2022–2023	→ Shrewsbury Town (loan)	7	(0)
2023	→ Nancy (loan)	11	(0)
2023–2025	Sochaux	48	(2)
2025–	Debrecen	13	(0)
- * Club domestic league appearances and goals as of 30 May 2026

Julien Joachim Dacosta (born 29 May 1996), sometimes written Julien Da Costa, is a French professional footballer who plays as a defender for Hungarian club Debreceni VSC.

== Personal life ==
Dacosta was born in France and is of Senegalese and Bissau-Guinean descent. He holds both French and Senegalese nationalities.

== Career ==
Before joining Niort in 2017, he was a youth player with Olympique de Marseille, his hometown club. Dacosta made his Ligue 2 debut for Niort on 28 July 2017, in a 0–0 draw with AC Ajaccio.

He signed for English club Coventry City in July 2020.

On 2 February 2022, Dacosta joined Primeira Liga side Portimonense on loan for the remainder of the 2021–22 season.

On 27 June 2022, Dacosta joined EFL League One club Shrewsbury Town on loan for the 2022–23 season.

On 31 January 2023, Dacosta was recalled from his loan spell with Shrewsbury Town and joined Championnat National side Nancy for the remainder of the season.

On 21 August 2023, Dacosta signed for Sochaux on a two-year deal.

On 8 July 2025, Dacosta signed for Hungarian club Debreceni VSC.

== Career statistics ==
As of match played on 26 May 2023

Club statistics
Club	Season	League			Cup		League Cup		Other		Total	
Club	Season	Division	Apps	Goals	Apps	Goals	Apps	Goals	Apps	Goals	Apps	Goals
Olympique de Marseille II	2015–16	Championnat de France Amateur	24	1	—						24	1
Olympique de Marseille II	2016–17	Championnat de France Amateur	22	0	—						22	0
Olympique de Marseille II	Total		46	1	0	0	0	0	0	0	46	1
Chamois Niortais	2017–18	Ligue 2	26	0	0	0	1	0	—		27	0
Chamois Niortais	2018–19	Ligue 2	27	0	2	0	1	0	—		30	0
Chamois Niortais	2019–20	Ligue 2	22	0	2	0	2	0	—		26	0
Chamois Niortais	Total		75	0	4	0	4	0	0	0	83	0
Chamois Niortais II	2017–18	Championnat National 3	1	0	—						1	0
Chamois Niortais II	2018–19	Championnat National 3	2	0	—						2	0
Chamois Niortais II	Total		3	0	0	0	0	0	0	0	3	0
Coventry City	2020–21	EFL Championship	18	0	1	0	0	0	—		19	0
Coventry City	2021–22	EFL Championship	4	0	0	0	1	0	—		5	0
Coventry City	2022–23	EFL Championship	0	0	0	0	0	0	—		0	0
Coventry City	Total		22	0	1	0	1	0	0	0	24	0
Portimonense (loan)	2021–22	Primeira Liga	11	0	0	0	0	0	—		11	0
Shrewsbury Town (loan)	2022–23	EFL League One	7	0	1	0	2	0	0	0	10	0
Nancy (loan)	2022–23	Championnat National	11	0	0	0	0	0	0	0	11	0
Debreceni VSC	2025–26	Nemzeti Bajnokság I	0	0	0	0	—				0	0
Career totals			175	1	6	0	7	0	0	0	188	1
