= Ádám Varga (footballer) =

Hungarian footballer (born 1999)

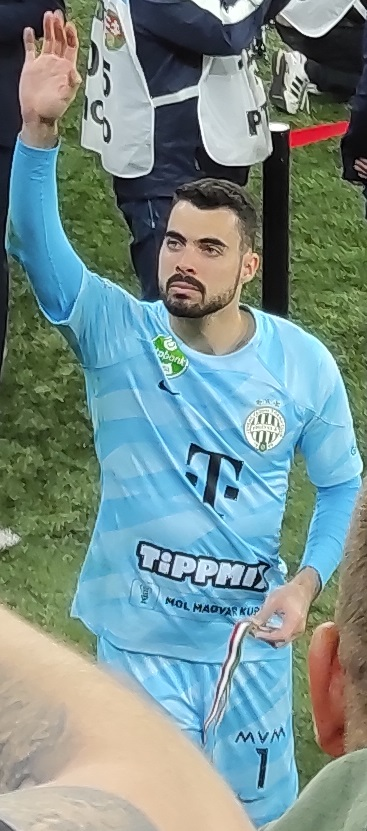
- Varga with Ferencváros in 2024

Personal information
- Date of birth: 12 February 1999 (age 27)
- Place of birth: Budapest, Hungary
- Height: 1.90 m (6 ft 3 in)
- Position: Goalkeeper

Team information
- Current team: Ferencváros
- Number: 1

Youth career
- 2006–2016: Ferencváros

Senior career*
Years	Team	Apps	(Gls)
2016–	Ferencváros II	24	(0)
2016–	Ferencváros	9	(0)
2020–2022	→ Soroksár (loan)	69	(0)
2022–2023	→ Kecskemét (loan)	9	(0)
2025	→ Debrecen (loan)	18	(0)

International career^{‡}
2014	Hungary U-16	1	(0)
2015	Hungary U-17	2	(0)
2016	Hungary U-18	2	(0)
2019	Hungary U-21	3	(0)
- * Club domestic league appearances and goals as of 30 May 2026 ‡ National team caps and goals as of 14 November 2019

Ádám Varga (born 12 February 1999) is a Hungarian football player who plays for Nemzeti Bajnokság I club Ferencváros.

== Career ==
=== Ferencváros ===
Varga signed his first professional contract with Ferencváros on 22 June 2015. On 29 October 2023, he was in the starting lineup against Újpest in the 2023–24 Nemzeti Bajnokság I season. After the match, Dejan Stanković, manager of Ferencváros, said that Varga was the best player against Újpest.

On 20 April 2024, the Ferencváros–Kisvárda tie ended with a goalless draw at the Groupama Aréna on the 29th match day of the 2023–24 Nemzeti Bajnokság I season which meant that Ferencváros won their 35th championship.

On 15 May 2024, Ferencváros were defeated by Paks 2–0 in the 2024 Magyar Kupa Final at the Puskás Aréna.

==== Loan to Kecskemét ====
On 29 July 2022, Varga moved on a season-long loan to Kecskemét.

==== Loan to Debrecen ====
On 9 July 2025, Varga moved on a season-long loan to Debreceni VSC.

== Honours ==
=== Ferencvárosi TC ===
- Nemzeti Bajnokság I: 2015–16
- Magyar Kupa: 2015–16
- Szuperkupa: 2015

== Club statistics ==
As of 15 May 2024

Appearances and goals by club, season and competition
Club	Season	League			Cup		Europe		Total	
Club	Season	Division	Apps	Goals	Apps	Goals	Apps	Goals	Apps	Goals
Ferencváros II	2016–17	Nemzeti Bajnokság III	24	0	—		—		24	0
Ferencváros	2016–17	Nemzeti Bajnokság I	0	0	0	0	0	0	0	0
Ferencváros	2017–18	Nemzeti Bajnokság I	0	0	0	0	0	0	0	0
Ferencváros	2018–19	Nemzeti Bajnokság I	1	0	0	0	0	0	1	0
Ferencváros	2021–22	Nemzeti Bajnokság I	0	0	—		0	0	0	0
Ferencváros	2022–23	Nemzeti Bajnokság I	—		—		0	0	0	0
Ferencváros	2023–24	Nemzeti Bajnokság I	4	0	6	0	1	0	11	0
Ferencváros	2024–25	Nemzeti Bajnokság I	0	0	1	0	1	0	2	0
Ferencváros	Total		5	0	7	0	2	0	14	0
Soroksár (loan)	2019–20	Nemzeti Bajnokság II	16	0	0	0	—		16	0
Soroksár (loan)	2020–21	Nemzeti Bajnokság II	26	0	1	0	—		27	0
Soroksár (loan)	2021–22	Nemzeti Bajnokság II	28	0	0	0	—		28	0
Soroksár (loan)	Total		70	0	1	0	—		71	0
Kecskemét (loan)	2022–23	Nemzeti Bajnokság I	9	0	2	0	—		11	0
Debrecen (loan)	2025–26	Nemzeti Bajnokság I	0	0	0	0	—		0	0
Career total			108	0	10	0	2	0	120	0

== Honours ==
Individual

- Nemzeti Bajnokság I Save of the Month: October 2023 November 2023
