= Nagyerdei Stadion =

All-seater asymmetric football stadium in Debrecen, Hungary

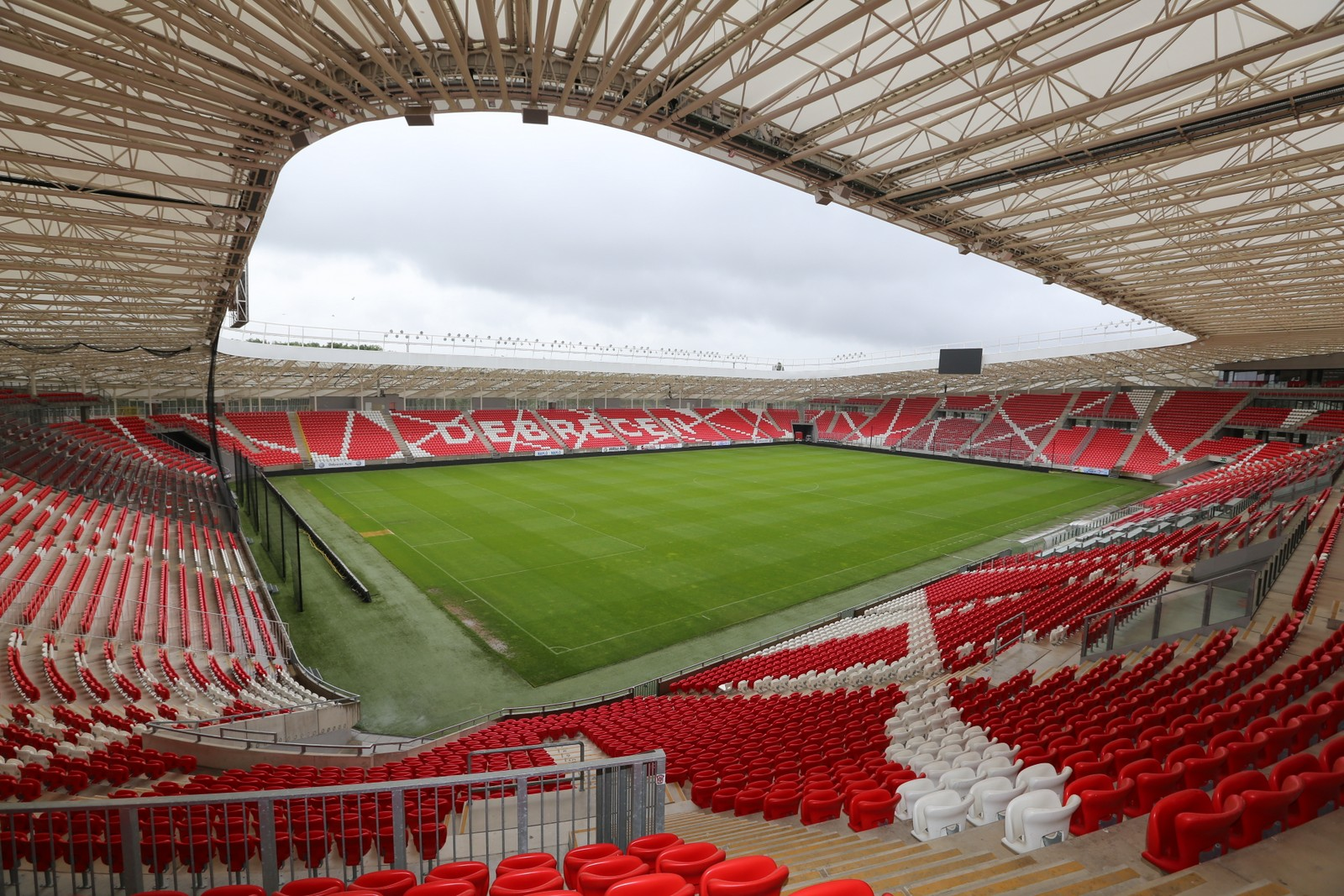
- UEFA
- Interactive map of Nagyerdei Stadion
- Full name: Debreceni Nagyerdei Stadion
- Location: Debrecen, Hungary
- Coordinates: 47°33′14″N 21°38′00″E
- Owner: City of Debrecen
- Operator: Debreceni VSC
- Capacity: 20,340
- Surface: Grass; Field
- Record attendance: 20,000 (Hungary vs Denmark, 22 May 2014)
- Field size: 105 m × 68 m (344 ft × 223 ft)

Construction
- Groundbreaking: 2013
- Built: 2013–2014
- Opened: 11 May 2014
- Cost: c. 11,5 billion HUF (€ 40 million)
- Architect: Péter Bordás
- Project manager: Géza Kamuti
- Structural engineer: Dezső Zsigmond
- Main contractor: Nagyerdei Rekonstrukciós Ltd.

Tenants
- Debreceni VSC; Diósgyőri VTK (2014, 2017); Hungary national football team Debreceni EAC (football) (2020–); Qatar national football team (2021); Israel national football team ^{temp.} (2025–2026)

Website
- Official Website

Nagyerdei Stadion is an all-seater asymmetric football stadium in Debrecen, Hungary and home to Debreceni Vasutas Sport Club (the seats behind the goals are 'Vario' or 'Rail' seats to facilitate safe standing at domestic matches). With space for 20,340 spectators, Nagyerdei stadion has the third largest capacity of any Hungarian football stadium, preceded by Puskás Aréna and Groupama Aréna and the second largest Nemzeti Bajnokság I stadium after Groupama Aréna. The stadium primarily hosts Debreceni Vasutas Sport Club's home matches. It was opened on 1 May 2014 and the first official match was played between Debrecen and Újpest in the 2013–14 season which ended with a 3–1 victory for the host team.

The ground also holds conference and banqueting suites and a club shop selling Debrecen merchandise.

== History ==
=== First era (1934–2013) ===
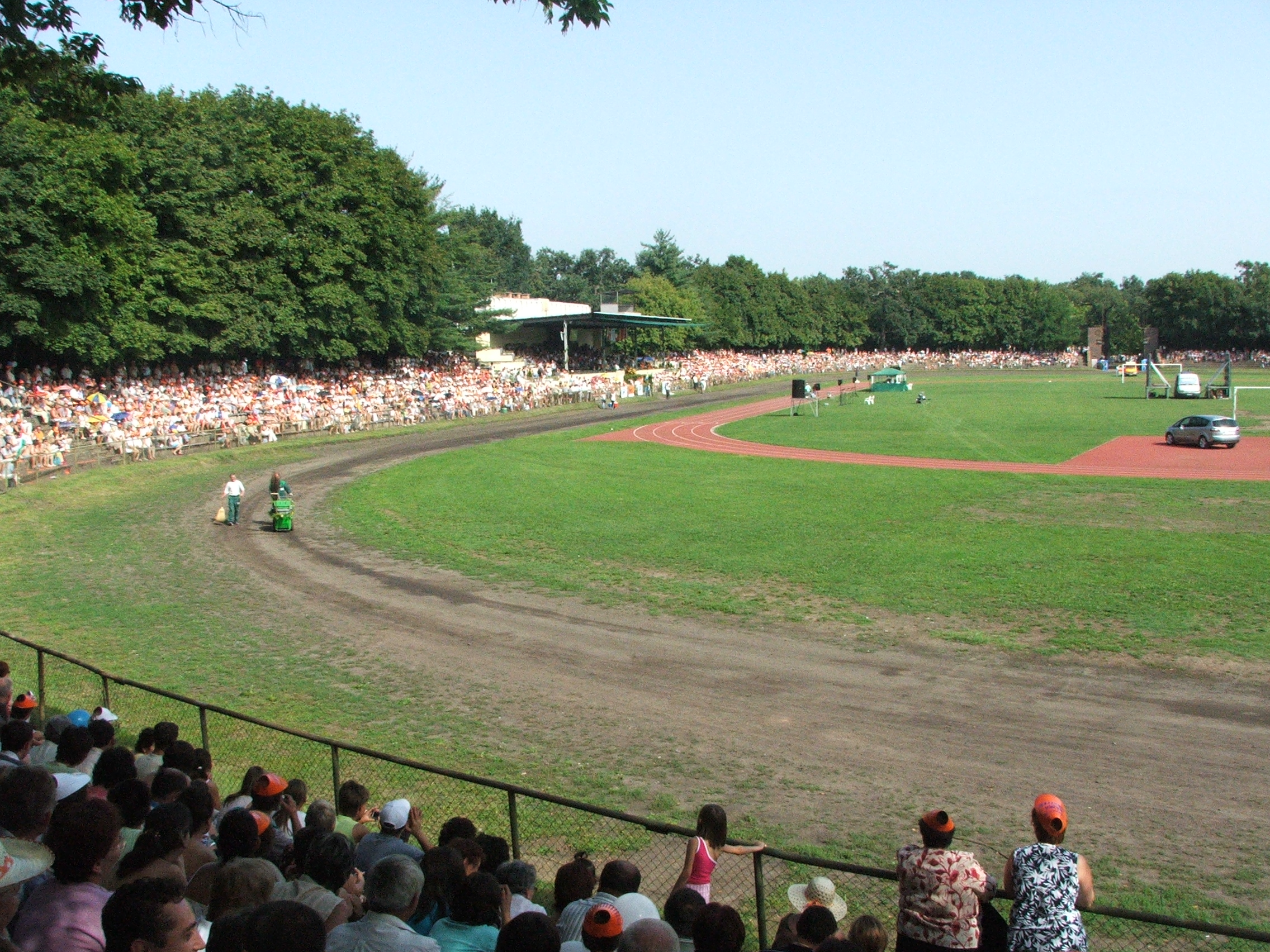
The old stadium in 2006

On 5 June 1934, the stadium was opened, although only couple of days later was the first official match played on 24 June 1934. Bocskai FC played against the Italian club Bologna F.C. 1909 in the Mitropa Cup 1934. The match ended with a 2–1 home victory, however Bocskai FC was eliminated from the Mitropa Cup 1934 season in front of 12,000 spectators.

Between 1934 and 2013 the Nagyerdei stadion was the home of Bocskai FC and Debreceni VSC. It hosted the Flower Carnival of Debrecen (Debreceni Virágkarnevál in Hungarian).

=== Reconstruction (2013–14) ===
On 29 March 2010, the first initial plans of a future stadium were presented. The designer of the stadium was Dezső Zsigmond. The stadium will be able to host about 20000 spectators.

On 22 September 2010, Péter Szijjártó, the correspondent of the Hungarian government, announced that the Hungarian government will support financially the construction of a new stadium in Debrecen. It was also announced the capacity of the stadium will be suitable for all matches of the UEFA Champions League matches except for the UEFA Champions League Final.

On 1 December 2010, it was announced that a project firm will be established in order to execute the construction of the new stadium. Lajos Kósa, mayor of Debrecen and Member of Parliament of Hungary, announced that by 2012 Debreceni VSC will be playing at the new stadium and can celebrated their 110-years anniversary of the foundation.

Tibor Krecz announced that there were four tenders among which there were Hungarian and foreign companies on 5 December 2012. It was also announced that the money available is enough for the execution of the construction. The committee of the NSR Ltd. will evaluate the tenders and announces the winner who can start the construction in the spring of 2013.

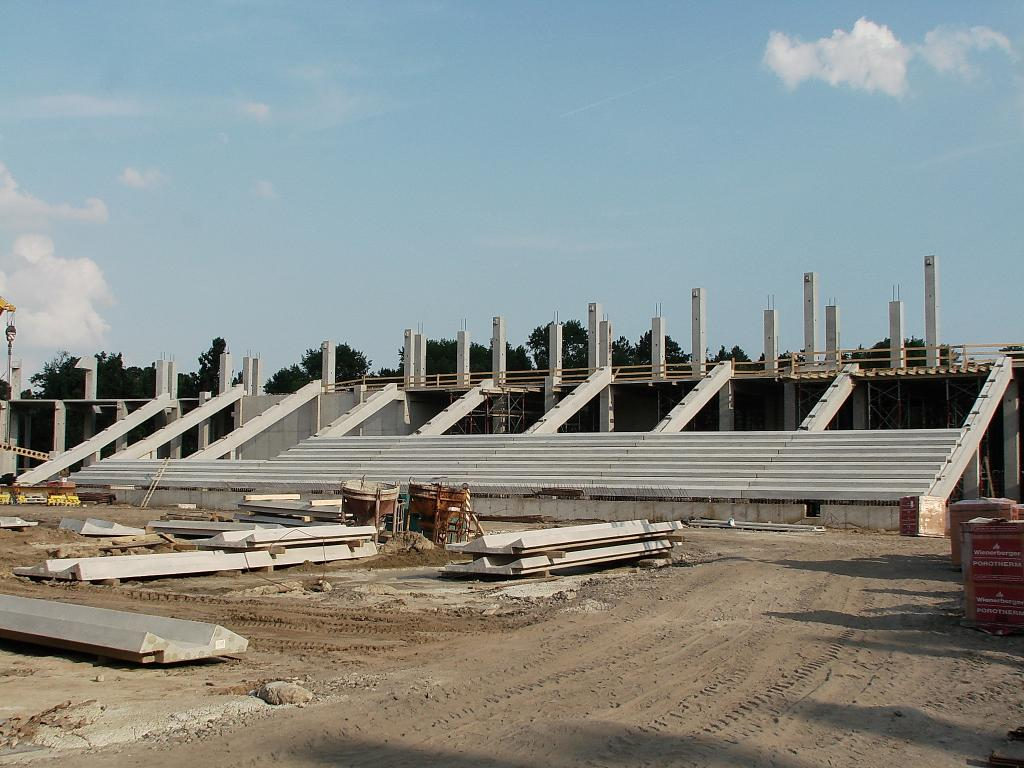
Construction of Nagyerdei Stadion in June 2013

The plans of the new stadium was presented and displayed on the official website of the Debreceni VSC on 3 May 2012.

The construction of the new stadium officially started on 29 January 2013. At the conference hall of the Kölcsey Centre Marjay Gyula (the project leader), László Vígh (member of the Hungarian Parliament), and Lajos Kósa, mayor of the City of Debrecen, officially started the reconstruction with an opening ceremony.

On 15 February 2013, Géza Kamuti, the project manager of the HUNÉP Universal Épitőipari Zrt., announced that the demolition of the old stadium was completed. On the same day two 40-centimetre-long shells, allegedly from the Second World War, were found during the construction of the stadium when excavator was demolishing the heating rooms. The police had to close the area with 50 metres.

The foot-stone was placed on 3 March 2013. It was announced that according to the plans, the stadium will be opened in April 2014. At the ceremony János Halász, minister of the Human resources of Hungary, was present who said that Debrecen deserves a new stadium.

On 24 September 2013, the construction of the pitch was started.

On 3 October 2013, a public procurement was announced for the reconstruction of the Nagyerdei Stadion. 16 658 red and 3391 white seats are going to be assembled.

The construction of the entrance gates to the stadium was started on 20 December 2013.

The floodlights system was first switched on at the stadium on 17 January 2014. The 216 light bulbs creates 1800 lux which meets the requirements of the HDTV broadcasts.

On 11 February 2014, it was announced that the first match will be played on 1 May 2014. According to the report of dehir.hu, the reconstruction of the stadium is 85% ready. Therefore, on 1 May 2014 the stadium can be opened.

On 3 March 2014, Lajos Kósa, mayor of City of Debrecen, Márton Vági, Secretary of Hungarian Football Federation, and Jenő Sípos, correspondent of the Hungarian Football Federation announced that the first match of the Hungary national football team will be against Denmark on 22 May 2014. The national team haven't played in Debrecen for 12 years when Hungary hosted Belarus at the Stadion Oláh Gábor Út in 2002.

The first bird view photos were released on 13 March 2014.

On 3 April 2014, it was announced that Vera Tóth, Gigi Radić, Viktor Király, Ildikó Keresztes, Gabriella Tóth, and Lou Bega are going to perform at the opening ceremony of the stadium. There is going to be an opening match between Debrecen All Stars and Hungary All Stars. Debrecen All Stars is going to include former Debrecen players such as Tamás Sándor, Csaba Madar, and Csaba Szatmári, while Lajos Détári and Márton Esterházy are going to play for the national team.

A 41-year-old worker died while working on the roof of the newly built stadium on 26 April 2014.

On 28 April 2014, Lajos Kósa announced that everything is ready for the opening ceremony to be held on 1 May 2014. It was also said at the press conference, hold on the turf of the new stadium, that the service providers are the Local government of the City of Debrecen (22%), Debrecen University (22%) and Campus Eleven (56%). Lajos Kósa also declared that the club will raise money for the family of the deceased worker on the opening ceremony. László Papp, vice mayor of Debrecen and Hungarian MP, said that 90% of the tickets are sold. Attila Nagy, managing director of the Debreceni Közlekedési Vállalat, said that company is prepared for the delivery of the 20,000 spectators from the centre of the city to the stadium. The company has never transported so many people before.

=== Second era (2014–present) ===
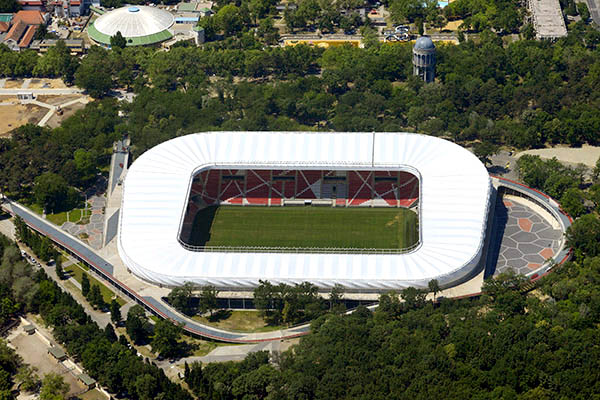
Nagyerdei stadion from bird view

On 1 May 2014, the Nagyerdei stadium was opened with an inauguration ceremony. Viktor Orbán, Hungarian prime minister, said that "the Hungarian spirit, the architects, the engineers, the workers make Hungary a great country again with constructions like the Nagyerdei stadium" (in Hungarian: "A magyar szellem, a tervezők, a mérnökök, a munkások ilyen alkotásokkal teszik ismét naggyá Magyarországot"). The stadium was also santificied by Nándor Bosák, bishop of the Roman Catholic Church, Gusztáv Bölcskei, minister, and Fülöp Kocsis, bishops of the Greek Catholic Church. After the sanctification, singers such as Lou Bega, Viktor Király, Ildikó Kersztes, Gigi Radić, and Erika Miklósa entertained the audience. The first match was played between the Debrecen All Stars and Hungary All Stars, including players such as Attila Pintér, current Hungary national football team coach, Kálmán Kovács, former Budapest Honvéd legend, Péter Lipcsei, former Ferencváros icon, György Véber, former Újpest icon and current Mezőkövesd manager, Imre Garaba, former Hungary international, Flórián Urbán, former Újpest legend, and Lajos Détári, former Hungary national team legend.

On 10 May 2014, the first official match was played at the new stadium between Debrecen and Újpest in the 2013–14 Hungarian League season. The match ended with a 3–1 victory over the Budapest-based rival, Újpest. The first goal of the match was scored by Kulcsár in the 27th minute. Although Vasiljević equalised the score in the 37th minute, Debrecen were able to clinch the victory in the second half due to an own goal by Antón in the 46th minute and a goal by Vadnai in the 85th minute.

On 22 May 2014, the first match of the Hungary national football team was played at the stadium in front of 20,000 spectators which ended with a 2–2 draw against Denmark national football team. The first goal was scored by the former Debrecen legend Dzsudzsák. Eriksen equalised the score in the 56th minute. The debutant Varga took the lead in the 69th minute again, but the score was equalised by Schöne in the 72nd minute.

Géza Róka, director of Debreceni Vasutas Sport Club, said in an interview on Sport 1 that they are expecting 10,000-11,000 spectators on average in the 2014–15 season at the new Nagyerdei Stadium. If the club reach this achievement, it could have a positive effect on the finances of the club. The club celebrates the opening of the new stadium with a Hungarian League title.

On 11 April 2024, it was confirmed that Hungary would host Israel at the stadium before the UEFA Euro 2024. On 8 June 2024, Hungary beat Israel 3-0 just one week before the UEFA Euro 2024. The goals were scored by Roland Sallai and Roland Varga.

Israel were required to play their home matches at neutral venues due to the Israel–Hamas war. Therefore, on 22 March 2025, Israel hosted Estonia at the stadium to play their first match in the 2026 FIFA World Cup qualification (UEFA) series. The match ended with a 2-1 victory for Israel.

In March 2026, it was announced that Hungary would host Kazakhstan national football team at the stadium in June.

== Costs ==
The Nagyerdei Stadion cost 45.2 million USD. The price per seat was US$2,222. In 2014, the arena was the 5th cost-effective building, overtaking the Groupama Arena of Ferencváros.

== Tenants ==
Debreceni VSC is the major tenant of the stadium.

On 20 June 2017, it was announced that Diósgyőri VTK will not play their home matches at the Mezőkövesdi Városi Stadion because the turf cannot endure it. As a consequence, Diósgyőr will play the home matches of the 2017–18 Nemzeti Bajnokság I matches at stadium of Debreceni VSC', Nagyerdei Stadion, in Debrecen.

On 8 March 2021, it was announced that Qatar national football team will host three international matches at the stadium against Azerbaijan, Republic of Ireland, and Luxembourg due to the COVID-19 pandemic.

On 6 June 2024, Hungary played their last preparatory match before the UEFA Euro 2024 against Israel national football team.

== Awards ==
Nagyerdei stadion was voted the 4th Stadium of the Year by Stadium Database.

== Transport connections ==
=== Bus ===
The stadium can be approached by bus No. 23Y from the centre of Debrecen. The service delivers passengers from Doberdó utca to Vámospércsi út from Monday to Sunday from 5 am to 10 pm. The service is provided by the Debreceni Közlekedési Vállalat (DKV).

=== Tram ===
Tha stadium can be approached by tram No. 1 from the centre of Debrecen.

=== Airport ===
From the Debrecen International Airport the Nagyerdei Stadion can be approached by car from the direction of Mikepércsi road, by shuttle bus or by rail.

== Milestone matches ==
| 1 May 2014 | Debrecen (Hungary) | 5 – 5 | (Hungary) Debrecen | Exhibition match First match |
| | | (Report) | | Attendance: 20,500 |

| 1 May 2014 | Debrecen All Stars (Hungary) | 4 – 4 | Hungary All Stars | Exhibition match First match |
| | | (Report) | | Attendance: 20,500 |

| 10 May 2014 | Debrecen (Hungary) | 3 – 1 | (Hungary) Újpest | 2013–14 Nemzeti Bajnokság I First Nemzeti Bajnokság I match |
| | Kulcsár 27'; Antón 46'; Vadnai 85' | (Report) | Vasiljević 37' | Attendance: 20,000; Referee: Erdős Hungary |

| 3 July 2014 | Diósgyőr (Hungary) | 2 – 1 | (Malta) Birkirkara | 2014-15 Europa League; First UEFA Europa League match |
| | Barczi 34'; Bacsa 90+3' | (Report) | Bissi 35' | Attendance: 6,112; Referee: (Andorra) Ignasi Villamayor Rozados |

| 5 July 2014 | Debrecen (Hungary) | 4 – 2 | (France) Olympique Lyonnais | Friendly match First international friendly match |
| | Sidibe 21' 69'; Kulcsár 40' 67' | (Report) | Yattara 46'; Bahlouli 75' | Attendance: 8,110; Referee: (Hungary) Tamás Bognár |

| 22 July 2014 | Debrecen (Hungary) | 2 – 0 | (Northern Ireland) Cliftonville | 2014-15 Champions League; First UEFA Champions League match |
| | Mihelič 55'; Sidibe 79' | (Report) | | Attendance: 11,000; Referee: (Serbia) Vlado Glodjović |

== National team matches ==
Matches played by Hungary

| 22 May 2014 | Hungary | 2 – 2 | Denmark | Friendly match |
| | Dzsudzsák 25'; R. Varga 69' | Report (UEFA) | Eriksen 56'; Schöne 72' | Attendance: 20,000; Referee: Szymon Marciniak (Poland) |

| 5 June 2015 | Hungary | 4 – 0 | Lithuania | Friendly match |
| | Stieber 15'; Dzsudzsák 20'; Nikolić 29'; Priskin 30' | (Report) | | Attendance: 6,218; Referee: Miroslav Zelinka (Czech Republic) |

| 8 June 2024 | Hungary | 3 – 0 | Israel | Friendly match |
| | Sallai 11'; R. Varga 19', 22' | Report (UEFA) | | Attendance: 19,900; Referee: Claudio Filipe Ruivo Pereira (Portugal) |

| 9 June 2026 | Hungary | 3 – 1 | Kazakhstan | Friendly match |
| 19:00 CEST (UTC+02:00) | Szoboszlai 52'; Schäfer 67'; R. Tóth 90+3' | Report (UEFA) | Malyi 9' | Attendance: 19,595; Referee: Pavle Ilić (Serbia) |

Matches played by other sides*

| 24 March 2021 | Qatar | 1 – 0 | Luxembourg | Friendly match |
| | Muntari 13' | Report (UEFA) | Skenderović (yellow card) 72' (yellow-red card) 88' | Attendance: 0 (behind closed doors); Referee: Miloš Đorđić (Serbia) |

| 27 March 2021 | Qatar | 2 – 1 | Azerbaijan | Friendly match |
| | Alhaydos 40' (pen.) 58' | Report (UEFA) | Sheydayev 16' (pen.) | Attendance: 0 (behind closed doors); Referee: Ivan Kružliak (Slovakia) |

| 30 March 2021 | Qatar | 1 – 1 | Republic of Ireland | Friendly match |
| | Muntari 47' | Report (UEFA) | McClean 4' | Attendance: 0 (behind closed doors); Referee: Balázs Berke (Hungary) |

| 22 March 2025 | Israel | 2 – 1 | Estonia | 2026 FIFA World Cup qualification |
| 20:45 | Hein 23' (o.g.); Dasa 75' | Report (UEFA) | Paskotši 10' | Attendance: 270; Referee: Nikola Dabanović (Montenegro) |

| 25 March 2025 | Israel | 2 – 4 | Norway | 2026 FIFA World Cup qualification |
| 20:45 | Abu Fani 55'; Turgeman 90+3' | Report (UEFA) | Møller Wolfe 39'; Sørloth 59'; Ajer 65'; Haaland 83' | Attendance: 1,200; Referee: Chris Kavanagh (England) |

| 8 September 2025 | Israel | 4 – 5 | Italy | 2026 FIFA World Cup qualification |
| 20:45 | Locatelli 16' (o.g.); Do. Peretz 52', 89'; Bastoni 87' (o.g.) | Report (UEFA) | Kean 40', 54'; Politano 58'; Raspadori 81'; Tonali 90+1' | Attendance: 2,540; Referee: Slavko Vinčić (Slovenia) |

| 27 September 2026 | Israel | 0 – 3 | Republic of Ireland | 2026–27 UEFA Nations (Note: Due to the Middle Eastern crisis, Israel are required to play their home matches at neutral venues.) (Note: The prospect of playing Israel is very controversial in the Republic of Ireland due to the Gaza war, Iran war, Lebanon war and Israeli war crimes in the ongoing Israeli–Palestinian conflict, many calling for the games to be boycotted. In 2025, the Football Association of Ireland voted in favour of suspending the Israel Football Association from club and international competitions, but said on 12 February 2026 that they would play against Israel.) |
| 20:45 | | Report (UEFA) | Parrott 13'; Idah 16'; Moylan 25' | Attendance: 319; Referee: Harm Osmers (Germany) |

| 1 October 2026 | Israel | 0 – 0 | Kosovo | 2026–27 UEFA Nations |
| 20:45 | | Report (UEFA) | | Attendance: 440; Referee: Radu Petrescu (Romania) |

| 17 November 2026 | Israel | 1 – 1 | Austria | 2026–27 UEFA Nations |
| 20:45 | Peretz 36' | Report (UEFA) | Kalajdžić 62' | Attendance: 510; Referee: Davide Massa (Italy) |

- Qatar, as the host of the 2022 FIFA World Cup, joined the impaired UEFA Qualification Group A by FIFA and UEFA permission as a non-participant sixth member of the group, to gain match experience before their first major tournament in the national team's history. Originally scheduled to play at the Generali Arena, Vienna, COVID-19 travel restrictions forced the team to select Debrecen instead.
- Israel played many of its matches in Debrecen during the Gaza War.

== Average attendances ==
As of 19 May 2026

Debrecen only played two matches at the Nagyerdei Stadion during the 2013–14 season. This table includes only domestic league matches.

| Season | Debreceni VSC | | | | | | | | Ref |
| Season | Division | GP | Average | Change | Highest Gate | | Lowest Gate | | Ref |
|---|---|---|---|---|---|---|---|---|---|
| 2014–15 | NB I | 15 | 3,818 | – | 8,157 | vs Ferencváros | 2,283 | vs Kecskemét | |
| 2015–16 | NB I | 17 | 3,010 | −21.1% | 6,241 | vs Ferencváros | 1,285 | vs MTK Budapest | |
| 2016–17 | NB I | 17 | 3,407 | +13.2% | 7,138 | vs Ferencváros | 1,685 | vs Budapest Honvéd | |
| 2017–18 | NB I | 16 | 3,916 | +14.9% | 10,841 | vs Ferencváros | 1,635 | vs Mezőkövesd | |
| 2018–19 | NB I | 16 | 3,547 | –9.1% | 7,002 | vs Diósgyőr | 1,828 | vs Budapest Honvéd | |
| 2025–26 | NB I | 16 | 7,216 | N/A | 16,876 | vs Ferencváros | 3,514 | vs Kazincbarcika | |

== Gallery ==
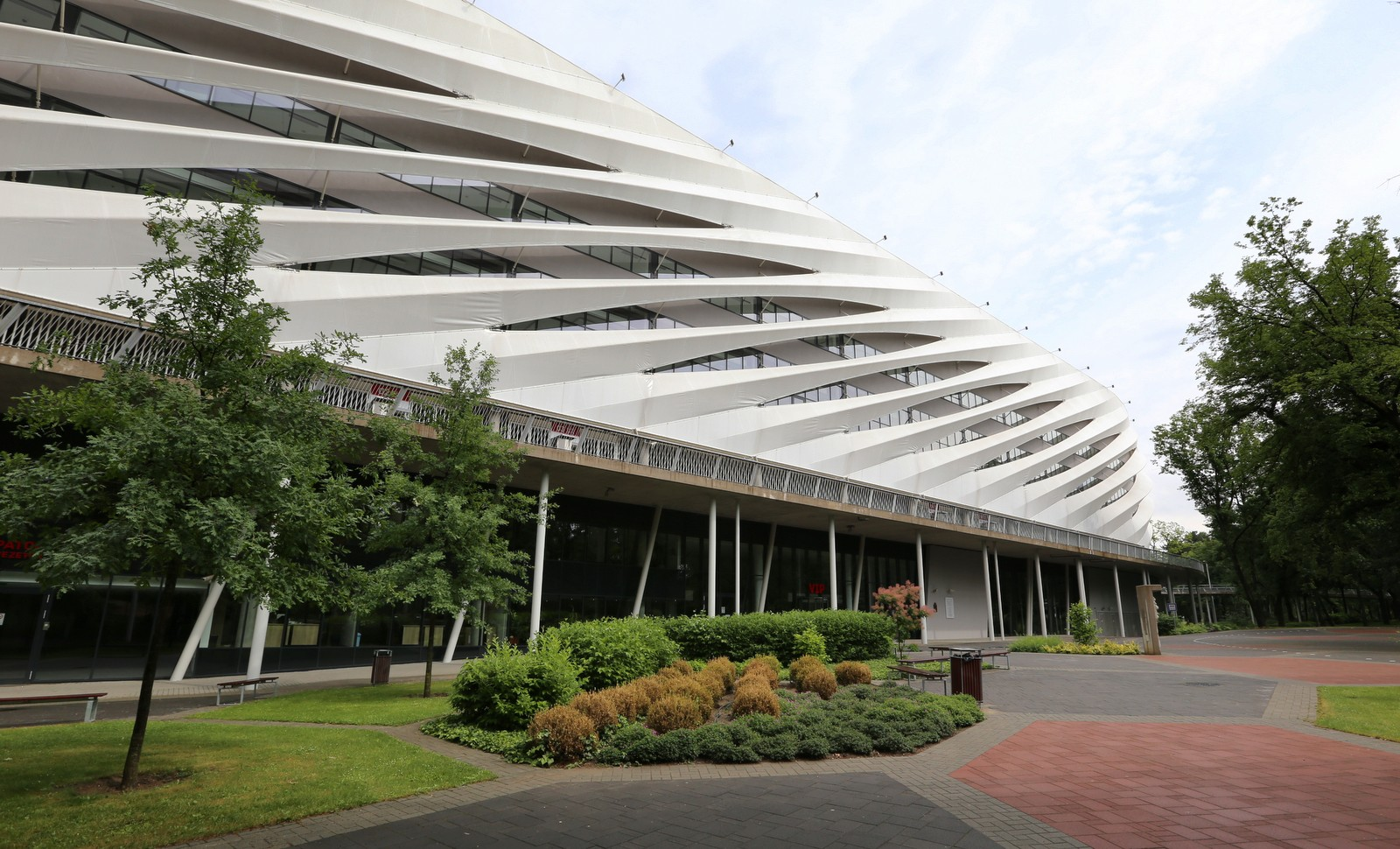
Exterior of Nagyerdei Stadion

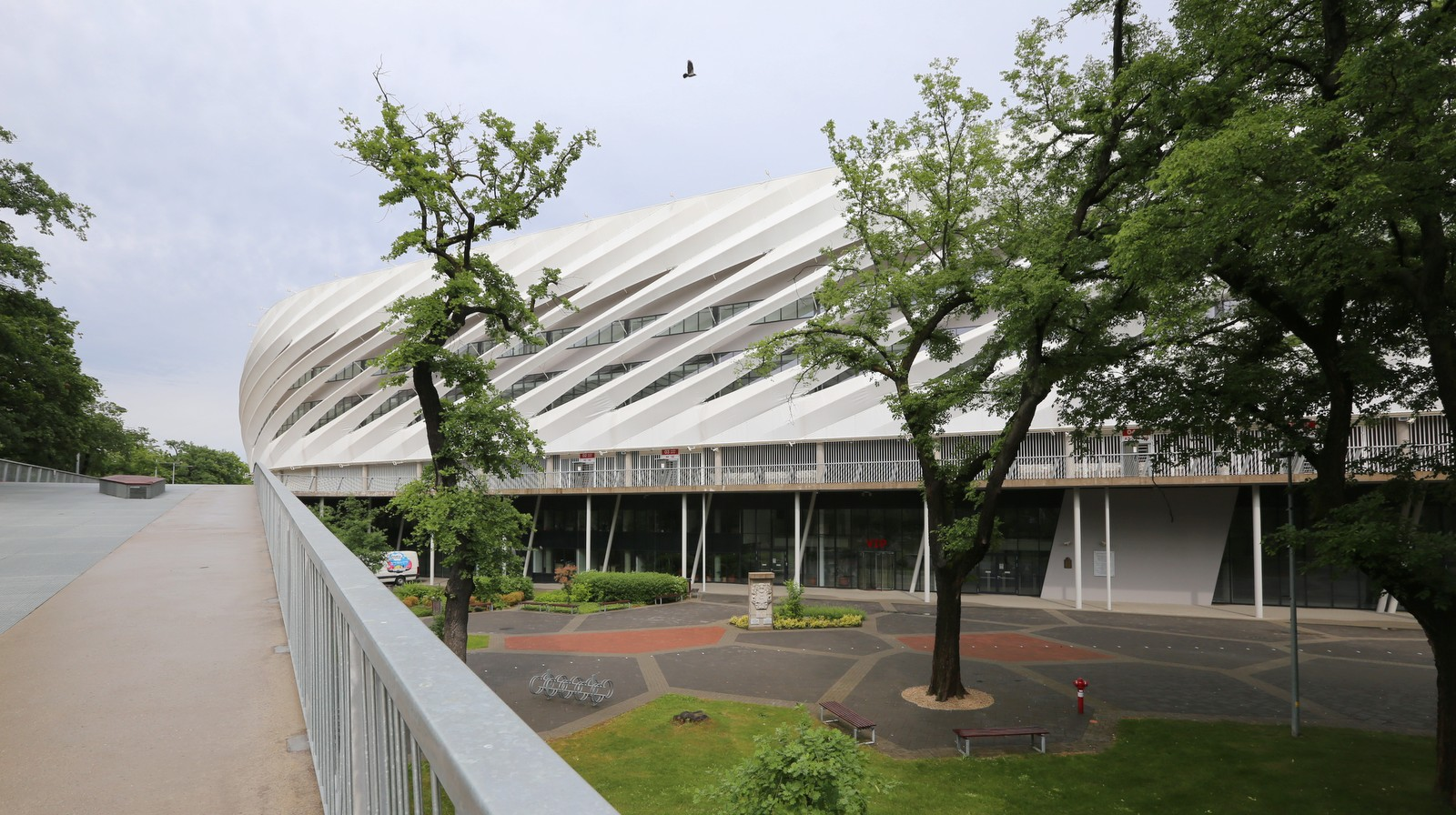
Exterior of Nagyerdei Stadion

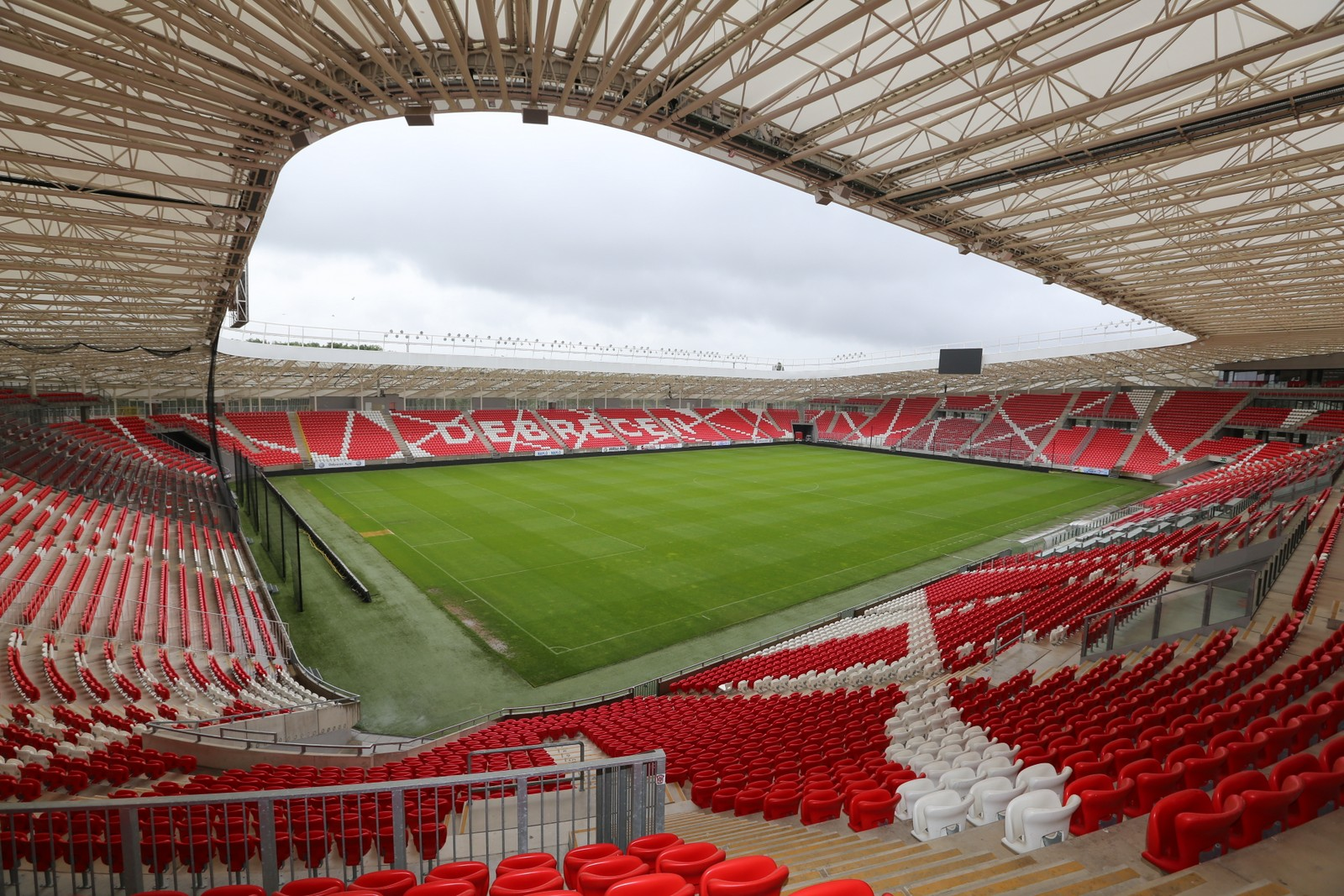
Interior of Nagyerdei Stadion

== See also ==
- List of football stadiums in Hungary
- Lists of stadiums
