= Niama Pape Sissoko =

Malian footballer (born 2005)

Personal information
- Date of birth: 16 December 2005 (age 20)
- Place of birth: Mali
- Height: 1.86 m (6 ft 1 in)
- Position: Striker

Team information
- Current team: SV Ried (on loan from Reims)

Youth career
- –2024: Afrique Football Élite
- 2024: Reims

Senior career*
| Years | Team | Apps | (Gls) |
| 2024– | Reims B | 21 | (12) |
| 2024– | Reims | 4 | (0) |
| 2025–2026 | → Debrecen (loan) | 7 | (0) |
| 2026 | → Nancy (loan) | 4 | (0) |
| 2026– | → SV Ried (loan) | 0 | (0) |
- * Club domestic league appearances and goals as of 12 May 2026

Niama Pape Sissoko (born 16 December 2005) is a Malian professional footballer who plays as a striker for Austrian Bundesliga club SV Ried on loan from the French club Reims.

== Career ==
Sissoko played for Afrique Football Élite in his native Mali before being transferred to Reims on 2 January 2024, signing a contract until 2028. He initially joined the club's reserve side. He also made his debuts for the under-19 side in the 2023–24 season, scoring seven goals in three league games, including five in one match. He would make his professional debut in Ligue 1 on 20 October 2024, coming on as a substitute in a 2–1 defeat away to Auxerre.

On 15 August 2025, Sissoko signed with Nemzeti Bajnokság I club Debreceni VSC. On 8 January 2026, he moved on a new loan to Nancy in Ligue 2. On 13 July 2026, Sissoko was loaned to SV Ried in Austria, with an option to buy.

== Honours ==
Reims

- Coupe de France runner-up: 2024–25
