= Fran Manzanara =

Spanish footballer

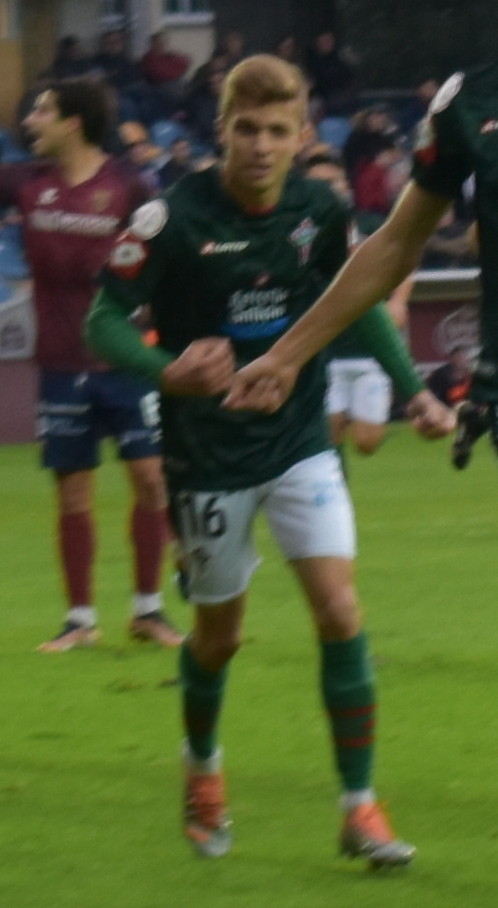
- Manzanara with Racing Ferrol in 2022

Personal information
- Full name: Francisco Jesús López de la Manzanara Delgado
- Date of birth: 12 September 1996 (age 30)
- Place of birth: La Solana, Spain
- Height: 1.83 m (6 ft 0 in)
- Positions: Centre back; midfielder

Team information
- Current team: AD Alcorcón

Youth career
- Valencia
- 2014–2015: Atlético Madrid

Senior career*
Years	Team	Apps	(Gls)
2014–2016	Atlético Madrid C	34	(1)
2015–2016	→ Jumilla (loan)	36	(2)
2016–2019	Levante B	94	(2)
2018–2020	Levante	4	(0)
2019–2020	→ Ponferradina (loan)	21	(1)
2020–2021	Numancia	23	(1)
2021–2025	Racing Ferrol	112	(4)
2025–2026	Debrecen	16	(0)
2026–	AD Alcorcón	0	(0)
- * Club domestic league appearances and goals as of 30 May 2026

Francisco Jesús "Fran" López de la Manzanara Delgado (born 12 September 1996) is a Spanish footballer who plays as either a central defender or a defensive midfielder for Spanish club AD Alcorcón.

== Club career ==
Born in La Solana, Ciudad Real, Castile-La Mancha, Manzanara was a Valencia CF youth graduate. In 2014 he joined Atlético Madrid, and made his senior debut with the C-team on 7 September 2014, starting in a 5–1 Tercera División home rout of AD Colmenar Viejo.

Manzanara scored his first senior goal on 2 November 2014, the equalizer in a 3–1 home win against CD Puerta Bonita. The following July, he was loaned to Segunda División B side FC Jumilla for the season.

On 25 July 2016, Manzanara moved to another reserve team, Atlético Levante UD in the third division. On 16 July 2018, after achieving promotion back to the Tercera División, he renewed his contract with the club.

Manzanara made his first team – and La Liga – debut on 24 November 2018, coming on as a late substitute for Sanjin Prcić in a 2–2 away draw against SD Huesca. The following 1 September, he moved to Segunda División side SD Ponferradina on a one-year loan deal.

Manzanara scored his first professional goal on 22 December 2019, netting his team's second in a 3–2 away win against UD Almería. The following 2 October, he terminated his contract with Levante.

On 24 June 2025, Manzara signed to Hungarian club Debreceni VSC.

== Career statistics ==
=== Club ===
As of match played 21 March 2021

Appearances and goals by club, season and competition
Club	Season	League			National Cup		Other		Total	
Club	Season	Division	Apps	Goals	Apps	Goals	Apps	Goals	Apps	Goals
Jumilla (loan)	2015–16	Segunda División B	36	2	1	0	—		37	2
Levante	2018–19	La Liga	4	0	0	0	—		4	0
Ponferradina (loan)	2019–20	Segunda División	21	1	2	0	—		23	1
Numancia	2020–21	Segunda División B	18	1	2	1	—		20	2
Career total			79	4	5	1	0	0	84	5
