= Josua Mejías =

Venezuelan footballer (born 1997)

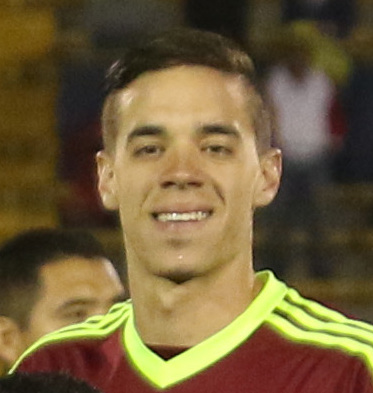
- Mejías in 2017

Personal information
- Full name: Josua Antonio Mejías García
- Date of birth: 9 June 1997 (age 29)
- Place of birth: Valencia, Venezuela
- Height: 1.85 m (6 ft 1 in)
- Position: Centre-back

Team information
- Current team: Debreceni VSC
- Number: 4

Youth career
- –2015: Carabobo

Senior career*
Years	Team	Apps	(Gls)
2015–2018	Carabobo	37	(1)
2017–2018	→ Leganés (loan)	0	(0)
2017–2018	→ Cartagena (loan)	27	(0)
2018–2022	Leganés	0	(0)
2018–2019	→ Gimnàstic (loan)	7	(0)
2019	→ Cartagena (loan)	11	(0)
2019–2020	→ Atlético Madrid B (loan)	22	(1)
2020–2021	→ Málaga (loan)	21	(0)
2021–2022	→ Beitar Jerusalem (loan)	15	(0)
2022–2023	Beitar Jerusalem	11	(0)
2023–2025	Athens Kallithea	46	(0)
2025–	Debrecen	28	(1)

International career^{‡}
2017	Venezuela U20	11	(1)
2021–	Venezuela	4	(0)
- * Club domestic league appearances and goals as of 30 May 2026 ‡ National team caps and goals as of 25 March 2025

Josua Antonio Mejías García (born 9 June 1997) is a Venezuelan professional footballer who plays as a centre-back for Hungarian League club Debrecen.

== Club career ==
Mejías came through the academy of local side Carabobo and made his first team debut at age 18 in July 2015. He would make 36 total league appearances (31 starts) for the club over the next two years, until he was acquired by Leganés in September 2017.

Leganés were then playing in La Liga, and they would send Mejías out on loan to gain his first European experience. After three seasons in the Spanish third tier with Cartagena, Gimnàstic, and Atlético Madrid B, Mejías moved up to the Segunda División with Málaga in the 2020/21 season, making 21 appearances during the year for the Andalusian club.

Mejías’ next loan was to Beitar Jerusalem. After making 15 league appearances in the 2021/22 season, Beitar would acquire Mejías from Leganés on a permanent transfer in August 2022. In the 2022/23 season, Mejías played 90 minutes in 11 of the first 13 rounds of the league.

In July 2023, Mejías joined Athens Kallithea FC in Super League 2.

On 1 July 2025, Mejías joined Debreceni VSC in Hungarian League.

== International career ==
Mejías was called up to the Venezuela under-20 side for the 2017 FIFA U-20 World Cup.

He made his debut for the Venezuela national football team on 7 October 2021 in a World Cup qualifier against Brazil.

== Career statistics ==
=== Club ===
As of 12 April 2025

Club	Season	League			National cup		Other		Total	
Club	Season	Division	Apps	Goals	Apps	Goals	Apps	Goals	Apps	Goals
Carabobo	2015	Venezuelan Primera División	16	0	3	0	0	0	19	0
Carabobo	2016	Venezuelan Primera División	14	1	0	0	0	0	14	1
Carabobo	2017	Venezuelan Primera División	7	0	0	0	0	0	7	0
Carabobo	Total		37	1	3	0	0	0	40	1
Cartagena	2017–18	Segunda División B	27	0	2	0	0	0	29	0
Gimnàstic	2018–19	Segunda División	27	0	2	0	0	0	29	0
Cartagena	2018–19	Segunda División	11	0	0	0	0	0	11	0
Atlético Madrid B	2019–20	Segunda División	22	1	0	0	0	0	22	1
Gimnàstic	2020–21	Segunda División	21	0	0	0	0	0	21	0
Beitar Jerusalem	2021–22	Israeli Premier League	0	0	0	0	0	0	0	0
Athens Kallithea	2023–24	Super League Greece 2	22	0	1	0	–		23	0
Athens Kallithea	2024–25	Super League Greece	18	0	0	0	–		18	0
Athens Kallithea	Total		40	0	1	0	–		41	0
Career total			165	2	9	0	0	0	174	2

=== International ===
As of match played 25 March 2025

Appearances and goals by national team and year
National team	Year	Apps	Goals	
rowspan="3"	Venezuela	2021	1	0
2022	1	0		
2025	2	0		
Total		4	0	

== Honours ==
Venezuela U20

- FIFA U-20 World Cup: Runner-up 2017
- South American Youth Football Championship: Third Place 2017
