= Amos Youga =

French footballer (born 1992)

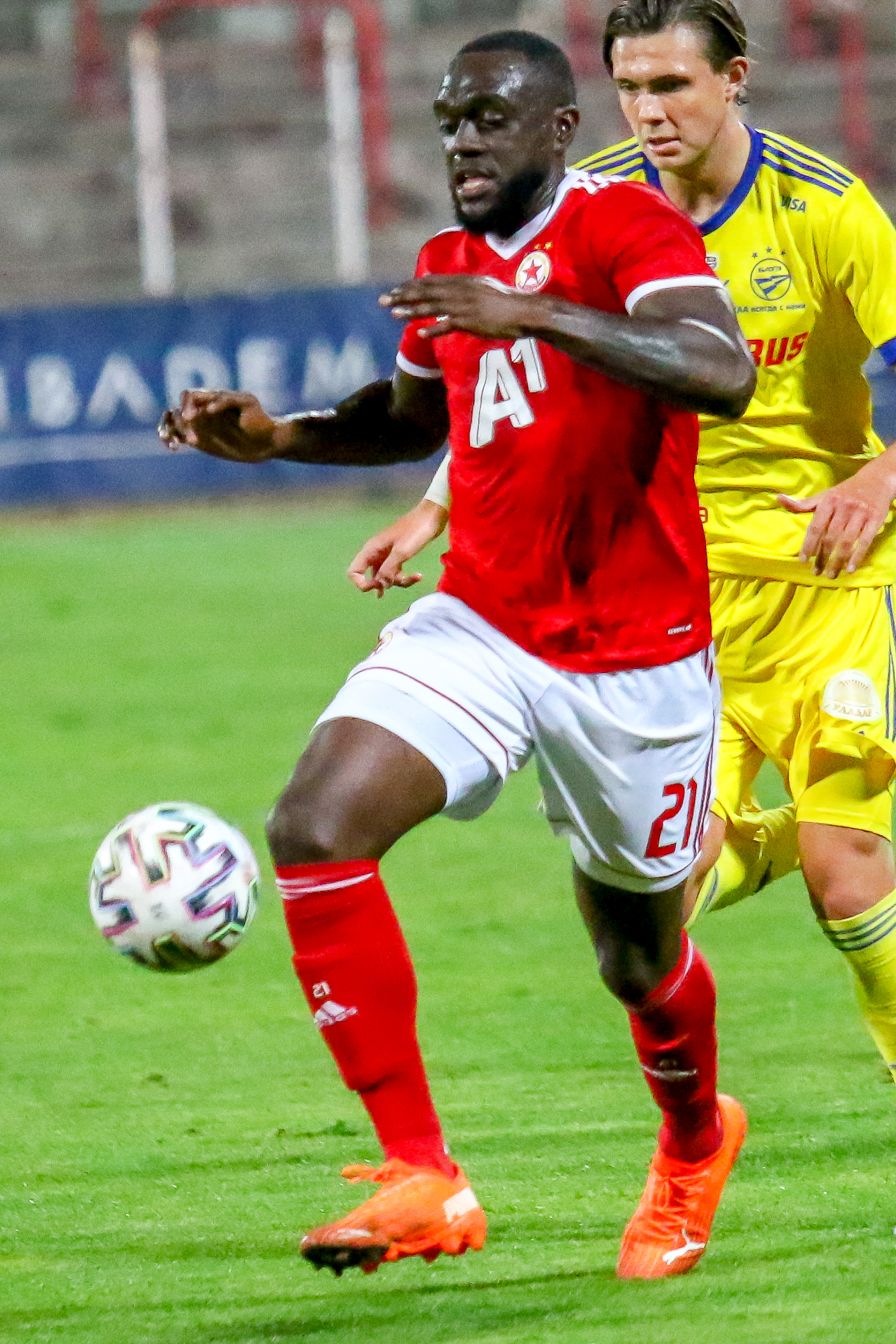
- Youga with CSKA Sofia in 2020

Personal information
- Full name: Amos Christopher Youga
- Date of birth: 8 December 1992 (age 33)
- Place of birth: Villeurbanne, France
- Height: 1.86 m (6 ft 1 in)
- Position: Central midfielder

Youth career
- Bourgoin-Jallieu
- 2007–2010: Saint-Priest

Senior career*
Years	Team	Apps	(Gls)
2010–2011	Saint-Priest	1	(0)
2011–2013	Lyon	0	(0)
2013–2014	Vannes	28	(1)
2014–2017	Gazélec Ajaccio	73	(4)
2017–2020	Le Havre	67	(3)
2020–2024	CSKA Sofia	106	(5)
2024	CSKA Sofia II	6	(0)
2025–2026	Debrecen	32	(3)

International career^{‡}
2013–	Central African Republic	27	(0)
- * Club domestic league appearances and goals as of 30 May 2026 ‡ National team caps and goals as of 19:35, 14 November 2024 (UTC)

Amos Christopher Youga (born 8 December 1992) is a professional footballer who plays as a central midfielder for Kisvárda FC, competing in the first division of hungarian football. He's a former player of the Central African Republic national team, having made 30 appearances for them between 2013 and 2025.

Youga started his career at Saint-Priest but soon made a move to Lyon, where he failed to break into the first team, playing only for the second squad. In 2013 he joined Vannes and remained there until June 2014 when signing for Gazélec Ajaccio of Ligue 2. In his first season at the club Youga earned promotion to the Ligue 1. He was a member of Gazélec Ajaccio's squad for three seasons and signed for Le Havre in 2017. Three years later, he moved to CSKA Sofia in Bulgaria.

Born in France, Youga made his international debut for Central African Republic in June 2013.

== Personal life ==
Youga is the brother of the Central African international Kelly Youga, and the uncle of the French youth international footballer Willem Geubbels. His mother was born in Boda, Central African Republic. He acquired French nationality on 3 November 1998, through the collective effect of his mother's naturalization.

== Career ==
=== Early career ===
A graduate of Saint-Priest's youth academy, Youga played one match in the Championnat National 3 in 2010–11 season, before joining Lyon in the summer of 2011. There he participated only for the second squad in the Championnat National 2, making 32 appearances for two seasons.

In June 2013, Youga joined Championnat National club Vannes. He enjoyed a successful season at Stade de la Rabine and quickly established himself as a first-team regular. On 25 February 2014, he scored the first competitive goal of his career, netting the third in a 3–2 home win over Strasbourg.

=== Gazélec Ajaccio ===
In June 2014, Youga joined Gazélec Ajaccio of Ligue 2. In his first season at the club he earned promotion to the Ligue 1, scoring 2 goals in 32 league games. He made his Ligue 1 debut on 16 August 2015, playing full 90 minutes in a 2–0 away loss against Paris Saint-Germain. In his three seasons with the club he played 79 games and scored 4 goals.

=== Le Havre ===
In the summer of 2017 Youga signed with Le Havre.

=== CSKA Sofia ===
On 15 June 2020, Youga joined Bulgarian club CSKA Sofia. He made his debut on 7 August in a 2–2 away draw against CSKA 1948 on the opening day of the 2020–21 season. He established himself as a starter for the "redmen" and also occasionally captained the side, but was demoted from the first team in the beginning of the 2024–25 season and subsequently played only for the reserves.

=== Debreceni VSC ===
On 6 December 2024, Youga signed with Debreceni VSC. He was to join the team for the pre-season at the beginning of January 2025. On 21 May 2026, after contract expired Youga leaves Debrecen.

== International career ==
At the age of 20, Youga made his international debut for the Central African Republic in a 2014 FIFA World Cup qualification match against Botswana on 15 June 2013.

== Career statistics ==
=== Club ===
As of 24 May 2025.

Appearances and goals by club, season and competition
Club	Season	League			Cup		League Cup		Continental		Other		Total	
Club	Season	Division	Apps	Goals	Apps	Goals	Apps	Goals	Apps	Goals	Apps	Goals	Apps	Goals
Saint-Priest	2010–11	National 3	1	0	0	0	0	0	—		—		1	0
Lyon B	2011–12	National 2	17	0	0	0	0	0	—		—		17	0
Lyon B	2012–13	National 2	15	0	0	0	0	0	—		—		15	0
Lyon B	Total		32	0	0	0	0	0	—		—		32	0
Lyon	2011–12	Ligue 1	0	0	0	0	0	0	0	0	—		0	0
Lyon	2012–13	Ligue 1	0	0	0	0	0	0	0	0	—		0	0
Lyon	Total		0	0	0	0	0	0	0	0	—		0	0
Vannes	2013–14	National	28	1	2	0	0	0	—		—		30	1
Ajaccio	2014–15	Ligue 2	32	2	0	0	1	0	—		—		33	2
Ajaccio	2015–16	Ligue 1	18	0	3	0	1	0	—		—		22	0
Ajaccio	2016–17	Ligue 2	23	2	1	0	0	0	—		—		24	2
Ajaccio	Total		73	4	4	0	2	0	—		—		79	4
Le Havre	2017–18	Ligue 2	30	1	0	0	1	0	—		—		31	1
Le Havre	2018–19	Ligue 2	25	2	3	0	0	0	—		—		28	2
Le Havre	2019–20	Ligue 2	12	0	0	0	1	0	—		—		13	0
Le Havre	Total		67	3	3	0	2	0	—		—		72	3
Le Havre II	2017–18	National 2	2	1	0	0	0	0	—		—		2	1
Le Havre II	2019–20	National 3	1	0	0	0	0	0	—		—		1	0
Le Havre II	Total		3	1	0	0	0	0	—		—		3	1
CSKA Sofia	2020–21	First League	29	0	3	0	–		10	0	–		42	0
CSKA Sofia	2021–22	First League	21	3	5	0	–		8	0	1	0	35	3
CSKA Sofia	2022–23	First League	29	1	2	0	–		6	0	0	0	37	1
CSKA Sofia	2023–24	First League	25	1	5	1	–		0	0	1	0	31	2
CSKA Sofia	2024–25	First League	0	0	0	0	–		–		–		0	0
CSKA Sofia	Total		106	5	15	1	—		24	0	2	0	145	6
CSKA Sofia II	2024–25	Second League	6	0	—		—		—		—		6	0
Debrecen	2024–25	Nemzeti Bajnokság I	13	1	—		—		—		—		13	1
Debrecen	2025–26	Nemzeti Bajnokság I	0	0	—		—		—		—		0	0
Debrecen	Total		13	1	0	0	—		0	0	0	0	13	1
Career total			329	15	24	1	4	0	24	0	2	0	381	16

=== International ===
As of match played 14 November 2024

Appearances and goals by national team and year
National team	Year	Apps	Goals
Central African Republic	2013	1	0
Central African Republic	2015	1	0
Central African Republic	2015	1	0
Central African Republic	2016	2	0
Central African Republic	2017	3	0
Central African Republic	2018	4	0
Central African Republic	2019	4	0
Central African Republic	2020	1	0
Central African Republic	2023	4	0
Central African Republic	2024	6	0
Total		27	0

== Honours ==
CSKA Sofia

- Bulgarian Cup: 2020–21
