= Đorđe Gordić =

Serbian footballer (born 2004)

Personal information
- Date of birth: 5 November 2004 (age 22)
- Place of birth: Priboj, Serbia and Montenegro
- Height: 1.88 m (6 ft 2 in)
- Position: Attacking midfielder

Team information
- Current team: Lommel
- Number: 22

Youth career
- Mladost Lučani

Senior career*
Years	Team	Apps	(Gls)
2021–2023	Mladost Lučani	43	(7)
2023–	Lommel	1	(0)
2024	→ TSC (loan)	9	(0)
2025	→ Radomlje (loan)	18	(3)
2025–2026	→ Debrecen (loan)	26	(3)

International career^{‡}
2020	Serbia U17	2	(0)
2021	Serbia U18	1	(0)
2022	Serbia U19	7	(0)
2022	Serbia U21	2	(0)
- * Club domestic league appearances and goals as of 16 August 2026 ‡ National team caps and goals as of 23 November 2022

Đorđe Gordić (Serbian Cyrillic: Ђорђе Гордић; born 5 November 2004) is a Serbian professional footballer who plays as an attacking midfielder for Belgian Pro League club Lommel.

== Career ==
On 3 January 2023, Gordić signed for Lommel of the Challenger Pro League, the second division in Belgian football.

=== Loan to Debrecen ===
On 17 July 2025, Gordić moved on a season-long loan to Nemzeti Bajnokság I club Debreceni VSC.
