= Álex Bermejo =

Spanish footballer

Personal information
- Full name: Alejandro Bermejo Escribano
- Date of birth: 11 December 1998 (age 27)
- Place of birth: Barcelona, Spain
- Height: 1.83 m (6 ft 0 in)
- Position: Winger

Team information
- Current team: UE Sant Andreu

Youth career
- Júpiter
- Espanyol
- Gramenet
- 2010–2016: Espanyol

Senior career*
| Years | Team | Apps | (Gls) |
| 2016–2019 | Espanyol B | 76 | (15) |
| 2019–2022 | Tenerife | 79 | (11) |
| 2022–2024 | Burgos | 75 | (9) |
| 2024–2025 | Farense | 24 | (1) |
| 2025–2026 | Debrecen | 14 | (0) |
| 2026– | Sant Andreu | | |
- * Club domestic league appearances and goals as of 15 July 2026

Alejandro "Álex" Bermejo Escribano (born 11 December 1998) is a Spanish professional footballer who plays as a right winger for Nemzeti Bajnokság I club Debreceni VSC.

== Club career ==
Born in Barcelona, Catalonia, Bermejo finished his formation with RCD Espanyol. He made his senior debut with the reserves on 13 November 2016, starting in a 0–0 Segunda División B away draw against CD Atlético Baleares.

Bermejo scored his first senior goal on 15 January 2017, but in a 1–2 loss at Valencia CF Mestalla. He was regularly used in the following campaigns, suffering relegation in 2017 but achieving promotion in 2018.

On 11 July 2019, Bermejo signed a three-year deal with Segunda División side CD Tenerife. He made his professional debut on 17 August, coming on as a late substitute for Aitor Sanz in a 0–2 away loss against Real Zaragoza.

Bermejo scored his first professional goal on 15 September 2019, netting the opener in a 4–0 away routing of Albacete Balompié. Ten days later, he scored a brace in a 4–1 away success over CD Lugo.

On 21 July 2022, free agent Bermejo signed a one-year contract with Burgos CF also in the second division. On 20 June 2024, he moved abroad for the first time in his career after signing a two-year deal with SC Farense of the Portuguese Primeira Liga.

On 24 July 2025, Bermejo signed with Nemzeti Bajnokság I club Debreceni VSC.
