= Sergio Navarro (footballer, born 1979) =

Spanish football manager

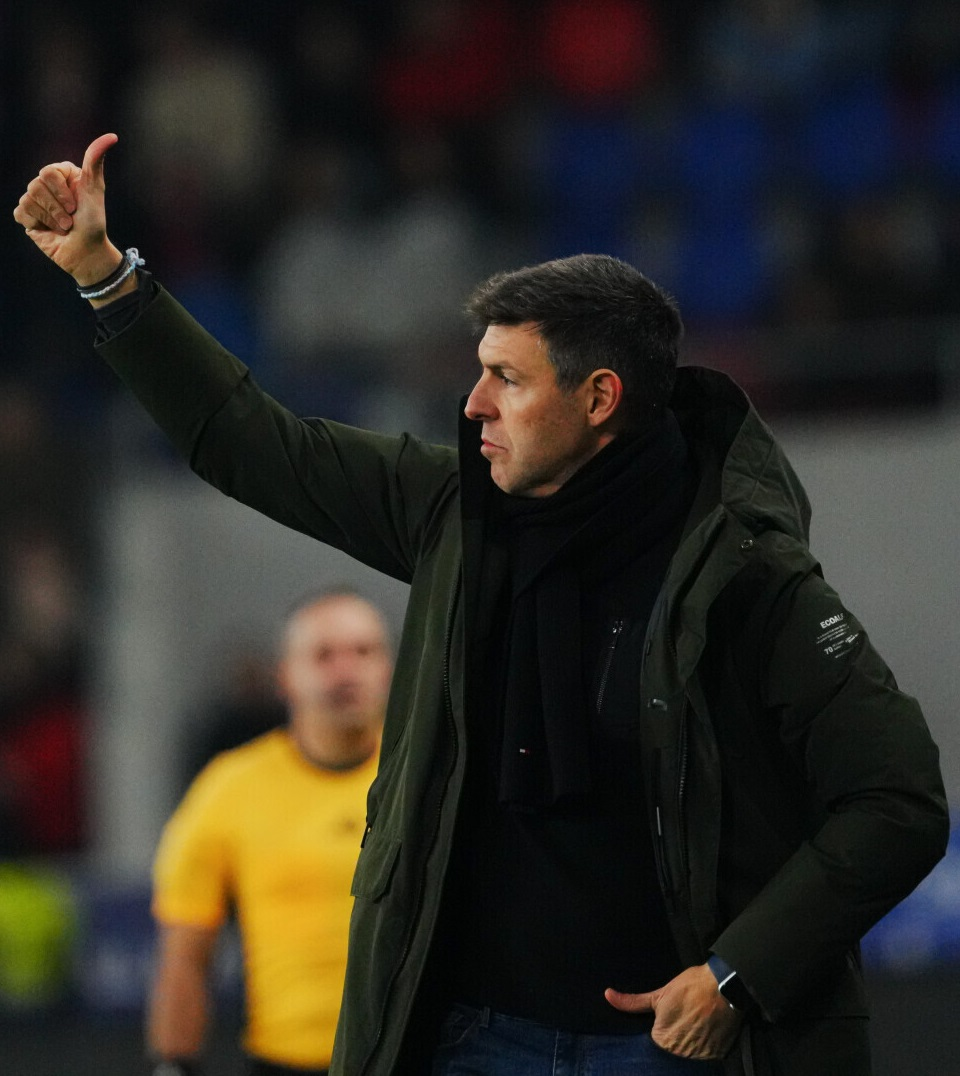
- Navarro managing Debrecen in 2025

Personal information
- Full name: Sergio Navarro Barquero
- Date of birth: 17 October 1979 (age 47)
- Place of birth: Huelva, Spain
- Position: Left back

Team information
- Current team: Milan Futuro (head coach)

Youth career
- Vall de Uxó

Senior career*
Years	Team	Apps	(Gls)
1997–1998	Villarreal	0	(0)
1997–1998	→ Buriana (loan)		
1998–1999	Vall de Uxó		
1999–2000	Pozoblanco		
2000–2001	Peña Deportiva		
2001–2005	Borriol		
2005–2007	Sant Jordi		

Managerial career
- 2006–2010: Castellón (youth)
- 2010–2011: Castellón B
- 2011–2013: Rubin Kazan (assistant)
- 2017: Karpaty Lviv
- 2018–2021: Levante (assistant)
- 2022–2025: Athletic Bilbao (assistant)
- 2025–2026: Debrecen
- 2026–: Milan Futuro
- * Club domestic league appearances and goals

Sergio Navarro Barquero (born 17 October 1979) is a Spanish professional football manager and a former player who is currently the head coach of Serie D club Milan Futuro (the reserve team of Serie A club AC Milan).

== Career ==
Navarro played with Villarreal and another teams in Tercera División and Divisiones Regionales de Fútbol until his retirement in the age of 26.

In 2005 he began a coaching career in Castellón sportive school as a coach of the different ages teams. He subsequently continued as a head of methodology with the Russian club Rubin Kazan from 2011 until 2013, and with Villarreal from 2014 until 2017.

In June 2017, he signed a contract with the Ukrainian Premier League club Karpaty Lviv as manager.

In July 2026, Navarro was appointed the head coach of Italian club AC Milan's reserve team Milan Futuro.

== Managerial statistics ==
As of match played 16 May 2026

Managerial record by team and tenure
Team	Nat	From	To	Record							
Team	Nat	From	To	G	W	D	L	GF	GA	GD	Win %
Castellón B	(Spain)	1 July 2010	30 June 2011	34	18	8	8	66	45	+21	52.94
Karpaty Lviv	(Ukraine)	16 June 2017	14 September 2017	8	1	3	4	6	19	−13	12.50
Debrecen	(Hungary)	17 June 2025	16 May 2026	35	15	11	9	54	43	+11	42.86
Milan Futuro	(Italy)	4 July 2026	Present	0	0	0	0	0	0	+0	—
Career total				77	34	22	21	126	107	+19	44.16
