= List of Debreceni VSC seasons =

Debreceni Vasutas Sport Club is a professional Hungarian football club based in Debrecen, Hungary.

== Key ==
Nemzeti Bajnokság I

- Pld = Matches played
- W = Matches won
- D = Matches drawn
- L = Matches lost
- GF = Goals for
- GA = Goals against
- Pts = Points
- Pos = Final position

Hungarian football league system

- NBI = Nemzeti Bajnokság I
- NBII = Nemzeti Bajnokság II
- NBIII = Nemzeti Bajnokság III
- MBI = Megyei Bajnokság I

Magyar Kupa

- F = Final
- SF = Semi-finals
- QF = Quarter-finals
- R16 = Round of 16
- R32 = Round of 32
- R64 = Round of 64
- R128 = Round of 128

UEFA

- F = Final
- SF = Semi-finals
- QF = Quarter-finals
- Group = Group stage
- PO = Play-offs
- QR3 = Third qualifying round
- QR2 = Second qualifying round
- QR1 = First qualifying round
- PR = Preliminary round

| Winners | Runners-up | Third | Promoted | Relegated |

== Seasons ==
As of 12 August 2026.

| Season | League | | | | | | | | | | Cup | International | | Manager | Ref. |
| Season | Tier | Div. | Pld | W | D | L | GF | GA | Pts. | Pos. | Cup | Competition | Result | Manager | Ref. |
|---|---|---|---|---|---|---|---|---|---|---|---|---|---|---|---|
| 1943–44 | 1 | NB I | 30 | 10 | 8 | 12 | 48 | 70 | 28 | 12th | ? | Did not qualify | | (Hungary) Móré | |
| 1945–46 ^{1} | 1 | NB I | 26 | 12 | 5 | 9 | 62 | 48 | 29 | 5th | ? | Did not qualify | | (Hungary) Palotás, (Hungary) Orosz | |
| 1945–46 ^{2} | 1 | NB I | 10 | 6 | 0 | 4 | 27 | 32 | 12 | 7th | ? | Did not qualify | | (Hungary) Palotás | |
| 1946–47 | 1 | NB I | 30 | 13 | 4 | 13 | 57 | 70 | 30 | 8th | ? | Did not qualify | | (Hungary) Palotás | |
| 1947–48 | 1 | NB I | 32 | 8 | 3 | 21 | 37 | 76 | 19 | 16th | ? | Did not qualify | | (Hungary) Markos | |
| 1948–49 | 2 | NBII | 30 | 24 | 1 | 5 | 104 | 33 | 49 | 1st | | Did not qualify | | | |
| 1949–50 | 1 | NB I | 30 | 4 | 5 | 21 | 39 | 103 | 13 | 16th | | Did not qualify | | (Hungary) Palotás | |
| | | Nemzeti Bajnokság II | | | | | | | | | | | | | |
| 1960–61 | 1 | NB I ↓ | 26 | 7 | 5 | 14 | 33 | 61 | 19 | 13th | | Did not qualify | | (Hungary) Teleki | |
| 1961–62 | 2 | NBII ↑ | 30 | 17 | 7 | 6 | 64 | | 41 | 1st | | Did not qualify | | | |
| 1962–63 | 1 | NB I | 26 | 6 | 9 | 11 | 31 | 50 | 21 | 12th | ? | Did not qualify | | (Hungary) Magyar, (Hungary) Lyka | |
| 1963 ^{3} | 1 | NB I | 13 | 2 | 2 | 9 | 15 | 31 | 6 | 14th | ? | Did not qualify | | (Hungary) Lyka | |
| 1964 | 1 | NB I | 26 | 5 | 4 | 17 | 24 | 54 | 14 | 13th | ? | Did not qualify | | (Hungary) Domán | |
| 1965 | 2 | NBII | 30 | 10 | 7 | 13 | 35 | 36 | 27 | 14th | | Did not qualify | | | |
| 1966 | 2 | NBII | 30 | 12 | 8 | 10 | 45 | 42 | 32 | 8th | | Did not qualify | | | |
| 1967 | 2 | NBII ↓ | 34 | 7 | 6 | 21 | 34 | 69 | 20 | 18th | | Did not qualify | | | |
| 1968 | 3 | NBIII | 30 | 15 | 6 | 9 | 50 | 40 | 36 | 4th | | Did not qualify | | | |
| 1969 | 3 | NBIII ↑ | 30 | 16 | 10 | 4 | 42 | 17 | 42 | 1st | | Did not qualify | | | |
| 1970 | 2 | NBII | 16 | 4 | 5 | 7 | 19 | 22 | 13 | 8th | | Did not qualify | | | |
| 1970–71 | 2 | NBII | 34 | 13 | 10 | 11 | 44 | 37 | 38 | 9th | | Did not qualify | | | |
| 1971–72 | 2 | NBII | 34 | 17 | 9 | 8 | 42 | 32 | 43 | 3rd | | Did not qualify | | | |
| 1972–73 | 2 | NBII | 34 | 10 | 10 | 14 | 31 | 42 | 30 | 14th | | Did not qualify | | | |
| 1973–74 | 2 | NBII | 34 | 7 | 16 | 11 | 30 | 37 | 30 | 14th | | Did not qualify | | | |
| 1974–75 | 2 | NBII | 38 | 16 | 11 | 11 | 52 | 43 | 43 | 5th | | Did not qualify | | | |
| 1975–76 | 2 | NBII | 38 | 20 | 9 | 9 | 70 | 43 | 49 | 4th | | Did not qualify | | | |
| 1976–77 | 2 | NBII | 38 | 15 | 12 | 11 | 50 | 39 | 42 | 8th | | Did not qualify | | | |
| 1977–78 | 2 | NBII | 38 | 23 | 7 | 8 | 51 | 36 | 53 | 3rd | | Did not qualify | | | |
| 1978–79 | 2 | NBII | 38 | 28 | 7 | 3 | 86 | 23 | 63 | 1st | | Did not qualify | | | |
| 1979–80 | 1 | NB I | 34 | 8 | 14 | 12 | 39 | 45 | 30 | 15th | ? | Did not qualify | | (Hungary) Teleki | |
| 1980–81 | 1 | NB I | 34 | 14 | 10 | 10 | 37 | 29 | 38 | 6th | ? | Did not qualify | | (Hungary) Teleki | |
| 1981–82 | 1 | NB I | 34 | 13 | 8 | 13 | 46 | 55 | 34 | 11th | ? | Did not qualify | | (Hungary) Kovács | |
| 1982–83 | 1 | NB I ↓ | 30 | 8 | 9 | 13 | 35 | 51 | 25 | 15th | ? | Did not qualify | | (Hungary) Kovács | |
| 1983–84 | 2 | NBII ↑ | 38 | 22 | 9 | 7 | 71 | 37 | 53 | 2nd | | Did not qualify | | | |
| 1984–85 | 1 | NB I | 30 | 11 | 8 | 11 | 35 | 33 | 30 | 8th | ? | Did not qualify | | (Hungary) Petróczi, (Hungary) Puskás | |
| 1985–86 | 1 | NB I | 30 | 7 | 11 | 12 | 24 | 46 | 25 | 13th | ? | Mitropa Cup | R | (Hungary) Puskás | |
| 1986–87 | 1 | NB I | 30 | 8 | 12 | 10 | 31 | 37 | 28 | 12th | ? | Did not qualify | | (Hungary) Puskás | |
| 1987–88 | 1 | NB I ↓ | 30 | 8 | 7 | 15 | 33 | 48 | 23 | 15th | ? | Did not qualify | | (Hungary) Vaczlavik | |
| 1988–89 | 2 | NBII ↑ | 30 | 20 | 6 | 4 | 54 | 18 | 70 | 1st | | Did not qualify | | | |
| 1989–90 | 1 | NB I | 30 | 7 | 14 | 9 | 20 | 30 | 35 | 14th | ? | Did not qualify | | (Hungary) Temesvári | |
| 1990–91 | 1 | NB I ↓ | 30 | 7 | 8 | 15 | 27 | 40 | 22 | 15th | ? | Did not qualify | | (Hungary) Szabó, (Hungary) Nagykaposi | |
| 1991–92 | 2 | NBII | 30 | 12 | 12 | 6 | 51 | 22 | 36 | 5th | | Did not qualify | | | |
| 1992–93 | 2 | NBII ↑ | 30 | 16 | 9 | 5 | 45 | 20 | 41 | 1st | | Did not qualify | | | |
| 1993–94 | 1 | NB I | 30 | 12 | 9 | 9 | 40 | 33 | 33 | 7th | QF | Did not qualify | | (Hungary) Garamvölgyi | |
| 1994–95 | 1 | NB I | 30 | 14 | 7 | 9 | 45 | 37 | 49 | 3rd | R16 | Did not qualify | | (Hungary) Garamvölgyi | |
| 1995–96 | 1 | NB I | 30 | 14 | 6 | 10 | 49 | 40 | 48 | 4th | QF | Did not qualify | | (Hungary) Garamvölgyi | |
| 1996–97 | 1 | NB I | 34 | 14 | 10 | 10 | 55 | 38 | 52 | 5th | R32 | Did not qualify | | (Hungary) Dunai | |
| 1997–98 | 1 | NB I | 34 | 13 | 9 | 12 | 46 | 48 | 48 | 9th | R64 | Did not qualify | | (Hungary) Garamvölgyi | |
| 1998–99 | 1 | NB I | 34 | 14 | 7 | 13 | 53 | 39 | 49 | 9th | W | Intertoto Cup | SF | (Hungary) Garamvölgyi | |
| 1999–00 | 1 | NB I | 32 | 14 | 8 | 10 | 52 | 41 | 50 | 6th | SF | UEFA Cup | 1R | (Hungary) Garamvölgyi | |
| 2000–01 | 1 | NB I | 36 | 13 | 5 | 18 | 58 | 64 | 47 | 11th | W | Did not qualify | | (Hungary) Komjáti | |
| 2001–02 | 1 | NB I | 38 | 9 | 17 | 12 | 47 | 53 | 44 | 8th | R16 | UEFA Cup | 1R | (Hungary) Pajkos, (Hungary) Dajka | |
| 2002–03 | 1 | NB I | 32 | 13 | 14 | 5 | 57 | 38 | 53 | 3rd | R | Did not qualify | | (Hungary) Szentes | |
| 2003–04 | 1 | NB I | 32 | 16 | 8 | 8 | 51 | 32 | 56 | 3rd | R32 | UEFA Cup | 3R | (Hungary) Szentes | |
| 2004–05 | 1 | NB I | 30 | 19 | 5 | 6 | 57 | 25 | 62 | 1st | R16 | Intertoto Cup | 1R | (Hungary) Szentes, (Hungary) Supka | |
| 2005–06 | 1 | NB I | 30 | 20 | 8 | 2 | 69 | 34 | 68 | 1st | SF | Champions League | 3QR | (Hungary) Supka | |
| 2006–07 | 1 | NB I | 30 | 22 | 3 | 5 | 63 | 21 | 69 | 1st | R | Champions League | 2QR | (Hungary) Supka, (Czech Republic) Beránek | |
| 2007–08 | 1 | NB I | 30 | 19 | 7 | 4 | 67 | 29 | 64 | 2nd | W | Champions League | 2QR | (Hungary) Herczeg | |
| 2008–09 | 1 | NB I | 30 | 21 | 5 | 4 | 70 | 29 | 68 | 1st | QF | UEFA Cup | 2QR | (Hungary) Herczeg | |
| 2009–10 | 1 | NB I | 30 | 20 | 2 | 8 | 63 | 37 | 62 | 1st | W | Champions League | GS | (Hungary) Herczeg | |
| 2010–11 | 1 | NB I | 30 | 12 | 10 | 8 | 53 | 43 | 46 | 5th | R | Champions League/Europa League | 3QR/GS | (Hungary) Herczeg, (Czech Republic) Ščasný, (Hungary) Kondás | |
| 2011–12 | 1 | NB I | 30 | 22 | 8 | 0 | 64 | 18 | 74 | 1st | W | Did not qualify | | (Hungary) Kondás | |
| 2012–13 | 1 | NB I | 30 | 14 | 4 | 12 | 47 | 36 | 46 | 6th | W | Champions League/Europa League | 3QR/PO | (Hungary) Kondás | |
| 2013–14 | 1 | NB I | 30 | 18 | 8 | 4 | 66 | 33 | 62 | 1st | SF | Europa League | 2QR | (Hungary) Kondás | |
| 2014–15 | 1 | NB I | 30 | 15 | 9 | 6 | 44 | 19 | 54 | 4th | R16 | Champions League/Europa League | 3QR/PO | (Hungary) Kondás | |
| 2015–16 | 1 | NB I | 33 | 14 | 11 | 8 | 48 | 34 | 53 | 3rd | SF | Europa League | 3QR | (Hungary) Kondás | |
| 2016–17 | 1 | NB I | 33 | 11 | 8 | 14 | 42 | 46 | 41 | 8th | R128 | Europa League | 2QR | (Hungary) Kondás, (Portugal) Pontes, (Hungary) Herczeg | |
| 2017–18 | 1 | NB I | 33 | 12 | 8 | 13 | 53 | 47 | 44 | 5th | SF | Did not qualify | | (Hungary) Herczeg | |
| 2018–19 | 1 | NB I | 33 | 14 | 9 | 10 | 44 | 39 | 51 | 3rd | SF | Did not qualify | | (Hungary) Herczeg | |
| 2019–20 | 1 | NB I ↓ | 33 | 11 | 6 | 16 | 48 | 57 | 39 | 11th | R32 | Europa League | 2QR | (Hungary) Herczeg, (Hungary) Vitelki, (Hungary) Kondás | |
| 2020–21 | 2 | NBII ↑ | 38 | 24 | 8 | 6 | 89 | 40 | 80 | 1st | QF | Did not qualify | | (Hungary) Kondás, (Hungary) Huszti/Toldi | |
| 2021–22 | 1 | NB I | 33 | 10 | 9 | 14 | 45 | 52 | 39 | 7th | R32 | Did not qualify | | (Hungary) Huszti/Toldi, (Spain) Carrillo | |
| 2022–23 | 1 | NBI | 33 | 15 | 9 | 9 | 52 | 39 | 54 | 3rd | QF | Did not qualify | | (Portugal) Janeiro, (Serbia) Blagojević | |
| 2023–24 | 1 | NBI | 33 | 14 | 6 | 13 | 49 | 48 | 48 | 5th | R16 | Conference League | 3QR | (Serbia) Blagojević | |
| 2024–25 | 1 | NB I | 33 | 9 | 7 | 17 | 52 | 59 | 34 | 9th | R32 | Did not qualify | | (Serbia) Blagojević, (Hungary) Máté, (England) El Maestro | |
| 2025–26 | 1 | NB I | 33 | 14 | 11 | 8 | 54 | 41 | 53 | 4th | R32 | Did not qualify | | (Spain) Navarro | |
| 2026–27 | 1 | NB I | 3 | 1 | 0 | 2 | 3 | 6 | 3 | 8th | R64 | Conference League | 3QR | (Estonia) Remmel | |

Notes

- Note 1: autumn championship
- Note 2: 1945–46 Play-off competition of places 1–5 of both competitions. (matches against teams in "own" class not played anymore)
- Note 3: season was abandoned after four match days, and is not official
- Note 4: Keleti csoport (Eastern division)

== See also ==
- Debreceni VSC
- Debreceni VSC in European football
- List of Debreceni VSC managers
