= List of Debreceni VSC managers =

Debreceni Vasutas Sport Club is a professional Hungarian football club, based in Debrecen, Hungary.

== Managers ==
Manager	Nationality	From	To	P	W	D	L	GF	GA	Win%	Honours	Notes
Imre Béki	Hungary	11 October 1920	28 February 1921									
István Vampetich	Hungary	1 July 1921	31 December 1925									
Béla Szolárszky & Gyula Lindenberger	Hungary	1930	1936									
István Wampetits	Hungary	1 September 1936	30 July 1937									
Merényi Lajos	Hungary	1 August 1937	31 July 1938									
Rudolf Keviczky	Hungary	1 August 1938	30 June 1939									
Ferenc Sipos	Hungary	1 August 1938	30 July 1940									
István Sidlik	Hungary	1 September 1939	30 November 1939									
István Palotás	Hungary	1 August 1940	15 February 1942									
Géza Nagy	Hungary	16 February 1942	30 April 1942									
Lajos Wéber	Hungary	1 May 1942	18 October 1942									
István Palotás	Hungary	20 October 1942	15 July 1943									
János Móré	Hungary	20 July 1943	30 September 1944									
István Palotás	Hungary	1 February 1945	12 March 1945									
Mihály Orosz	Hungary	13 March 1945	25 September 1945	1	1	0	0	3	2			
István Palotás	Hungary	26 September 1945	31 August 1947									
Imre Markos	Hungary	1 September 1947	9 May 1948	27	6	3	18	30	61			
Endre Szabó	Hungary	10 May 1948	30 June 1948	4	1	0	3	5	14			
István Palotás	Hungary	1 July 1948	18 March 1950									
Dezső Kántor	Hungary	20 March 1950	28 September 1950	11	1	0	10	13	13	40		
János Móré	Hungary	1 October 1950	10 June 1952									
Ferenc Rátkai	Hungary	11 June 1952	30 July 1952									
Géza Kalocsay & Elek Szilárd	(Hungary) (Czechoslovakia)	1 August 1952	30 June 1953									
Antal Lyka	Hungary	1 July 1953	31 December 1954	26	6	9	11	31	50			
István Palotás	Hungary	1 January 1955	30 June 1957									
János Móré	Hungary	1 July 1957	10 March 1959									
András Tisza	Hungary	1959										
Gyula Teleki	Hungary	1959	1961									
Ferenc Magyar	Hungary											
Antal Lyka	Hungary	1 July 1962	31 December 1963									
Gyula Lóránt	Hungary	1963										
Gyula Domán	Hungary			13	1	1	11	4	30			
György Szűcs	Hungary	1 July 1964	30 April 1965	13	4	3	6	20	24			
Imre Komlóssy	Hungary	1 May 1965	10 April 1967									
Nándor Bányai	Hungary	12 April 1967	28 August 1967									
István Sidlik	Hungary	30 August 1967	31 December 1967									
László Sárosi	Hungary	1 January 1968	31 December 1968									
András Nagyszalóki	Hungary	1 January 1969	31 December 1969									
István Pyber	Hungary	1 January 1970	30 June 1972									
János Nagy	Hungary	1 July 1972	11 March 1973									
László Leányvári	Hungary	12 March 1973	30 June 1973									
Béla Marosvári	Hungary	1 July 1973	31 October 1974									
László Leányvári	Hungary	1 November 1974	31 December 1974									
Balázs Makray	Hungary	1 January 1975	15 February 1978									
Gyula Teleki	Hungary	16 February 1978	30 June 1980									
Ferenc Kovács	Hungary	1 July 1980	30 June 1983									
Károly Lakat &Tamás Kertész	Hungary	1 July 1983	30 June 1984									
György Nagy	Hungary	1 July 1984	31 October 1984	10	5	3	2	12	8			
Gábor Petróczi	Hungary	1 November 1984	1 March 1985	8	2	3	3	12	14			
Lajos Puskás	Hungary	1 March 1985	30 June 1987	72	19	25	28	66	94	63		
László Kiss & Ferenc Vaclavik	Hungary	1 July 1987	4 March 1988									
Miklós Temesvári	Hungary	1 July 1988	30 June 1990									
Béla Szabó	Hungary	1 July 1990	1 December 1990	15	2	4	9	9	19			
Elemér Nagykaposi	Hungary	1 January 1992	1 December 1991	2	1	0	1	3	3	50		
Ferenc Ebedli	Hungary	1 January 1992	31 December 1992									
Lajos Garamvölgyi	Hungary	1 January 1993	15 October 1996	100	46	24	30	157	121	46		
Antal Dunai	Hungary	17 October 1996	5 April 1997	14	3	7	4	12	10	21.42		
András Herczeg	Hungary	1997	1998									
Lajos Garamvölgyi	Hungary	27 October 1998	30 June 2000	57	28	14	15	97	60	49.12		
András Komjáti	Hungary	1 July 2000	15 March 2001									
János Pajkos	Hungary	19 March 2001	11 December 2001	5	3	0	2	12	9	60		
László Dajka	Hungary	11 December 2001	8 June 2002									
Lázár Szentes	Hungary	12 June 2002	1 November 2004	44	22	11	11	69	41	50		
Attila Supka	Hungary	3 November 2004	8 August 2006	59	35	14	10	119	66	59.32	2004–05 NBI, 2005–06 NBI	
Miroslav Beránek	Czech Republic	12 August 2006	27 November 2007	46	29	9	8	95	39	63.04	2006–07 NBI	
András Herczeg	Hungary	15 December 2007	31 December 2010	132	77	17	38	260	177	58.33	2008–09 NBI 2009–10 NBI	
Zdeněk Ščasný	Czech Republic	1 January 2011	20 April 2011	14	4	4	6	17	22	28.57		
Elemér Kondás	Hungary	20 April 2011	25 July 2016	217	115	54	48	402	221	52.99	2011–12 NBI 2013–14 NBI	
András Herczeg (caretaker)	Hungary	26 July 2016	8 August 2016	2	2	0	0	5	0	100		
Leonel Pontes	Portugal	8 August 2016	22 May 2017	29	8	7	14	32	42	27.58		
András Herczeg	Hungary	22 May 2017	27 December 2019	107	48	21	38	179	153	44.86		
Zoltán Vitelki	Hungary	30 December 2019	7 June 2020	12	3	3	6	14	20	25		
Elemér Kondás	Hungary	7 June 2020	16 February 2021	33	20	8	5	68	29	60.61		
Szabolcs Huszti & Gábor Toldi	Hungary	16 February 2021	28 October 2021	21	11	4	6			52.38		
Joan Carrillo	Spain	8 November 2021	27 June 2022	21	7	5	9	20	29	33.33		
João Janeiro	Portugal	27 June 2022	31 August 2022	6	0	4	2	9	13	0		
Srđan Blagojević	Serbia	21 September 2022	26 August 2024	62	29	12	21	95	78	46.77		
Csaba Máté	Hungary	30 August 2014	27 October 2024	6	1	0	5	8	14	16.67		
Tibor Dombi (interim)	Hungary	28 October 2024	10 November 2024	3	0	2	1	4	5	0		
Nestor El Maestro	England	11 November 2024	14 June 2025	21	7	4	10	37	35	33.33		
Sergio Navarro	Spain	1 July 2025	16 May 2026	35	15	11	9	54	43	42.86		
Gert Remmel	(Estonia) Estonian	3 June 2026	actually	3	1	1	1	1	2	33.33		
