= History of Debreceni VSC =

History of professional Hungarian football club

Debreceni Vasutas Sport Club is a professional Hungarian football club based in Debrecen, Hungary.

== Early years (1902–1942) ==
The club was founded on 12 March 1902, initially being known as "Egyetértés Futball Club" but on becoming independent it was renamed "Debreceni Vasutas Sport Club" (Debrecen Railway Sports Club). In 1926 professionalism came to the Hungarian football scene, with the unfortunate result that Bocskai FC was formed using players from DVSC and city rivals DKASE and DTE, with the result that Bocskai FC ruled the football roost in Debrecen for 15 years while DVSC continued to struggle in the lower divisions. In 1940 the professional/amateur division of players was abolished and Bocskai FC suffered financial collapse, returning DVSC to top-dog position in the city. Debrecen reached the Hungarian First Division for the first time in 1942–43, but then suffered something of a yo-yo existence for the next fifty years, suffering eight relegations in all, and even starting the 1967 season in the Third Division. During this period the club underwent a number of name changes. It became "Debreceni Vasutas Sport Egyesület" in 1948–49, "Debreceni Lokomotiv" (hence the nickname) in 1949, "Debreceni Törekvés" in the 1955–56 season, and it was known as "Debreceni Vasutas SC" from 1957 to 1979. In 1979 the two city teams, DVSC and DMTE were united into one team, called DMVSC, but after ten years the clubs split again and the team adopted its current name.

== Back to the First Division ==
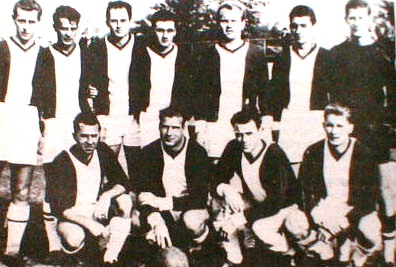
Debrecen in 1964

Debrecen's most successful period has been since its most recent promotion to the First Division in 1993, since when the club has won its only national honours – the Hungarian Cup was won in 1999 and 2001, and the Hungarian League title for the first time in 2005. Although the team was relegated from top flight football in 2001 as a result of questionable refereeing on home matches (Ref. Béla Kiss was helped to escape from the stadium by officials in order to avoid the crowd's anger after the match against Budapest Honvéd FC), the then promoted BKV Előre SC could not afford to play in the first league in lack of the necessary financial conditions, thus DVSC remained in the top flight as the better relegated team according to the rules and regulations of the championship which led to some controversy whether it was just.

The first international matches were played in 1998 in the Intertoto Cup. Debreceni VSC beat Dnepr Mogilev, FC Hradec Králové, Hansa Rostock, and lost to Ruch Chorzów in the semi-finals.

In 1999 Debrecen played in the first round of the UEFA Cup 1999-00 and they were beaten by the German VfL Wolfsburg 3–2 on aggregate. Although Debrecen beat the German club 2–1 at home, they lost 2–0 in the away-game, and their first UEFA Cup season ended.

== 2000s: Golden years ==
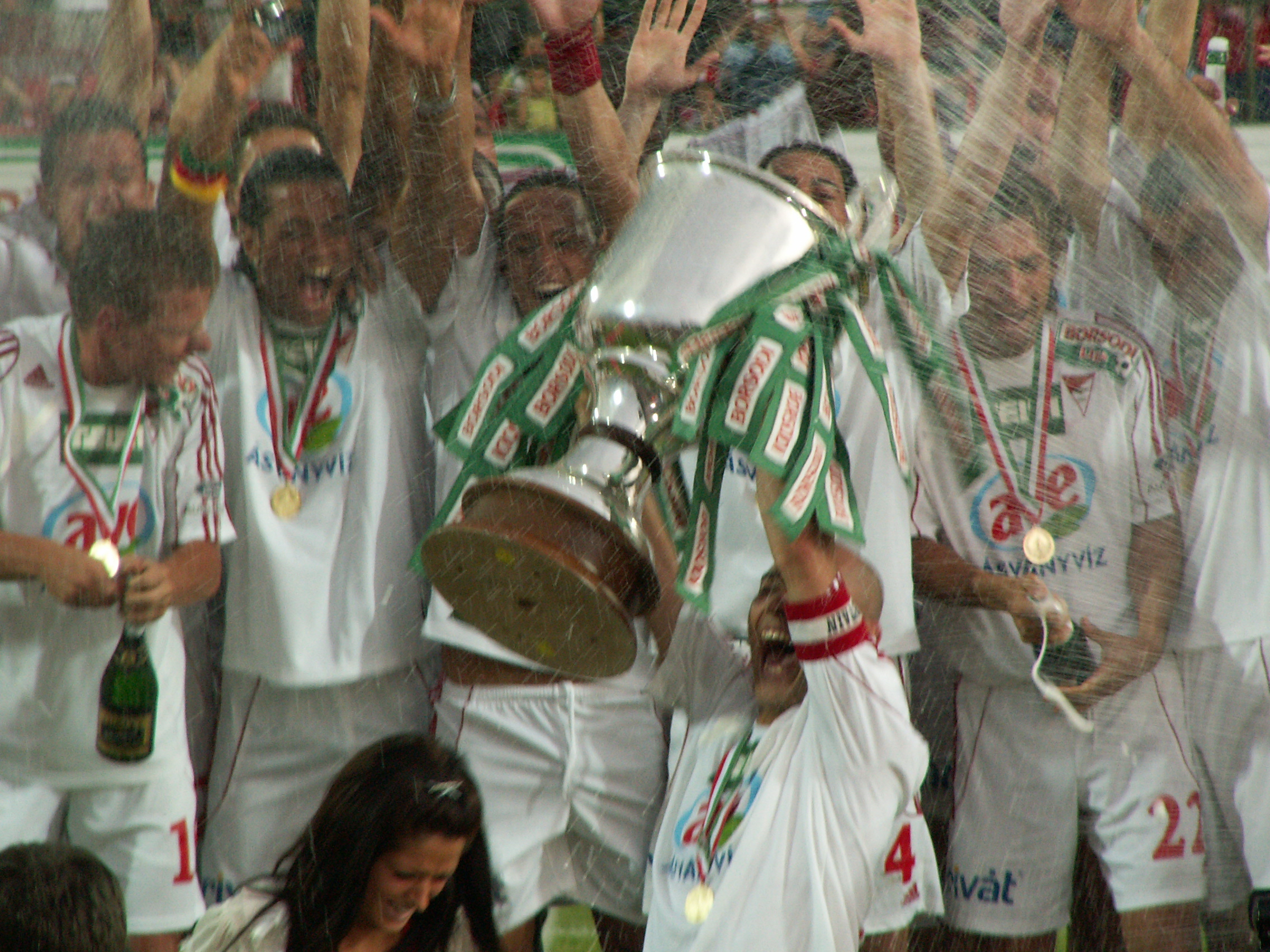
The third title of the Hungarian League in the 2006–07 season

Debrecen won the 2000–01 Magyar Kupa. Therefore, in 2001 Debrecen they could enter the UEFA Cup 2001-02 where they beat the Moldovan club Nistru Otaci 3–1 on aggregate in the first round. In the second round of the UEFA Cup Debrecen played with the French club Bordeaux. They lost 5–1 away, but beat the French club 3–1 at home.

Debrecen finished third in the 2002-03 Nemzeti Bajnokság I season. Therefore, they entered the UEFA Cup 2003-04 season. Debrecen drew with the Lithuanian club FK Ekranas in the first leg of the qualifiers, while in the second leg the result was the same. After extra time Debrecen scored a goal and won 3–2 on aggregate. In the first round they had to face NK Varteks. Debrecen won both matches, 3–1 in the first leg and 3–2 in the second leg. The team won 6–3 on aggregate causing the resignation of the coach of the Croatian club. In the second round Debrecen faced with the Greek PAOK. In the first leg they drew 1–1 in the Toumba Stadium in Thessaloniki, Greece. At home the result was a goalless draw, therefore Debrecen went through on away goals (1–1). Debrecen's first successful UEFA Cup career was ended in the third round when they faced with the Belgian Club Brugge. In the first leg Debrecen was beaten by 1–0 in Jan Breydel Stadium, Bruges, Belgium. The goalless second leg resulted the end of the march of the Hungarian club.

In the 2003–04 Nemzeti Bajnokság I season Debrecen finished third, therefore they could play in the UEFA Intertoto Cup 2004–05 season. In the first round Debrecen faced with the Slovak club Spartak Trnava. In the first leg Debrecen lost 3–0 in Trnava, Slovakia, while at home they won 4–1. Debrecen were eliminated from the Intertoto Cup on away goals (4–4).

In 2005 Debrecen won their first Hungarian National Championship title preceding Ferencváros by six points. As a consequence the team could play in the UEFA Champions League for the first time. The first match in the UEFA Champions League 2005-06 qualifiers was played in 2005 against the Croatian club, Hajduk Split. Debreceni VSC beat the Croatian rivals 8–0 on aggregate beating Hajduk Split 3–0 at home and 5–0 away. In the next round Debreceni VSC had to face one of the best teams in Europe, Manchester United and lost 0–6 on aggregate. Debrecen could have consoled themselves in the 2005–06 UEFA Cup, but they had to face the Ukrainian club Shakhtar Donetsk. In the first leg (15 September 2005) the Ukrainian club beat Debrecen 4–1 in the RSC Olimpiyskiy stadium in Donetsk, Ukraine. The only Hungarian goal was scored by Sidibe. In the second leg (29 September 2005) Debrecen lost 2–0 in the Stadion Oláh Gábor Út. Debrecen were eliminated 6–1 on aggregate.

Debrecen managed to duplicate the feat and win the Hungarian National Championship I 2005-06, after in the last round on 3 June, they defeated Pápa 4–1, and the then the leader of the league Újpest (who had the same number of points as Debrecen but had more away wins) lost to Fehérvár in a climactic battle ending in 3–1, which also caused Fehérvár to place 3rd.

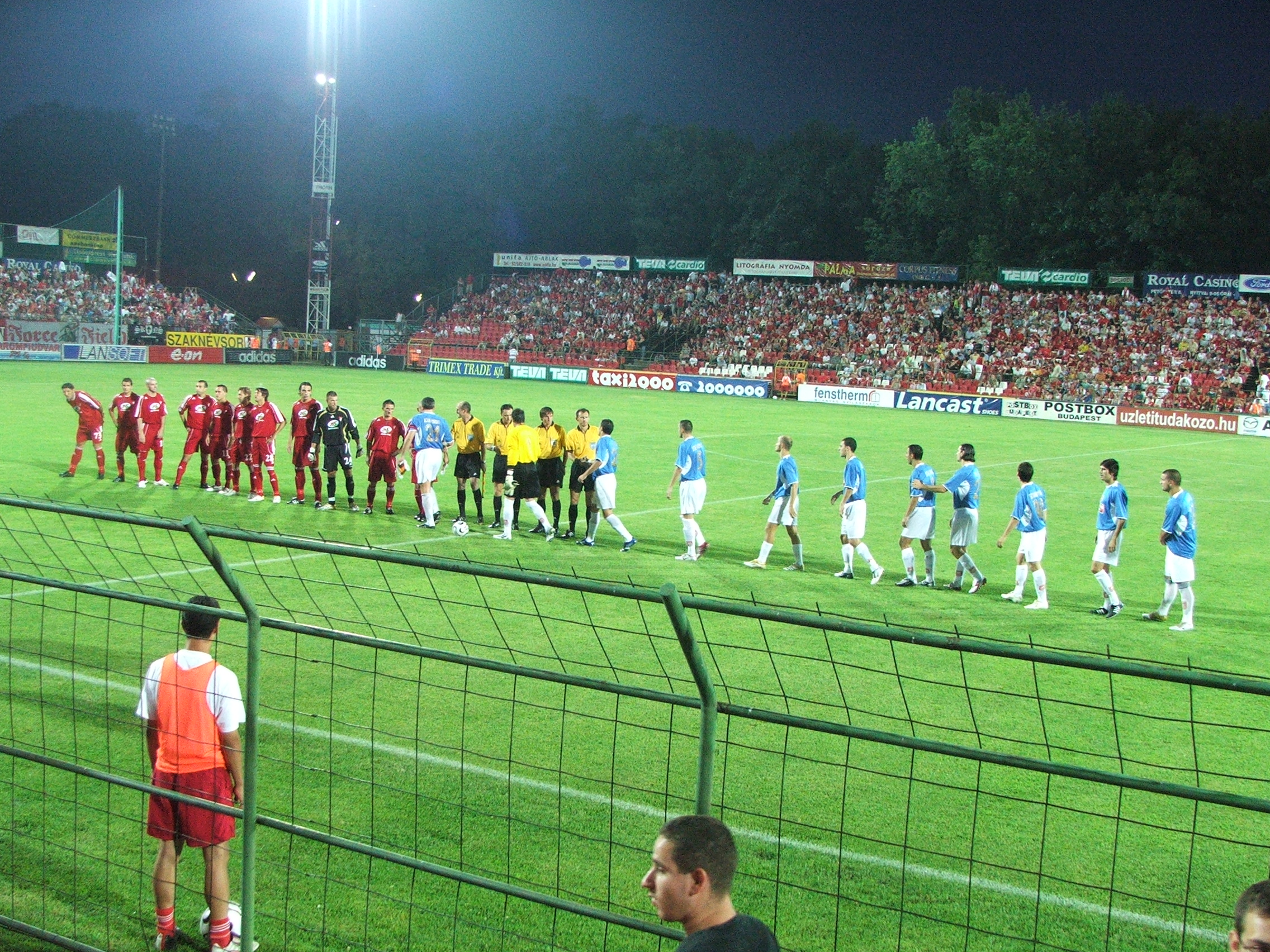
UEFA Champions League 2006-07 Qualifying match between Debrecen and Rabotnicki Skopje

In the qualifiers of the 2006–07 UEFA Champions League Debrecen faced with Macedonian champion Rabotnički Skopje. In the first leg (26 July 2006) Debrecen drew at home in the Stadion Oláh Gábor Út. the Hungarian goal was scored by Róbert Zsolnai. In the second leg (2 August 2006) Debrecen took the lead by a goal by Sidibe in the 20th minute, but Rabotnicki scored four more goals. Debrecen were eliminated from the UEFA Champions League on 5–2 aggregate. After being eliminated from the Champions League Supka resigned.

In the Hungarian National Championship I 2006-07 season Debrecen became again champion on the 28th match-day beating Rákospalotai EAC on home turf. Debrecen became the first non-Budapest team winning the Hungarian title for the third time in a row.

András Herczeg's first trophy was won against Budapest Honvéd by 4–1 on aggregate. The first leg finished 1–1 in the Bozsik Stadion. In the second leg Dzsudzsák scored twice, while the third goals was scored by Kiss.

In the UEFA Champions League 2007-08 season Debrecen entered in the second qualifying round. Debrecen faced with the Swedish champion Elfsborg. The Swedish club won the first leg by 1–0, while a goalless draw in Sweden was enough for Elfsborg to go through the third qualifying round. Debreceni VSC were eliminated from the UEFA Champions League 1–0 on aggregate.

In the 2007–08 Nemzeti Bajnokság I season Debrecen finished second while MTK became first. Debrecen won the 2007–08 Magyar Kupa season by beating Budapest Honvéd in the final 9–1 on aggregate. Given the fact that Debrecen finished second in the Hungarian League and won the Hungarian Cup, the club qualified for the UEFA Cup 2008-09 season. Debrecen had to enter the first qualifying round.

Since Debrecen could not win the Hungarian Championship, they had to play in the UEFA Cup 2008-09. In the first round of the Central-East region they drew in Kazakhstan against Shakhter Karagandy 1–1, while in the second leg they beat the Kazakh team by 1–0. Debrecen qualified for the second round by 2–1 on aggregate. In the second round Debrecen faced with the Swiss Young Boys. In the first leg they lost 4–1 in Bern. In the second leg they lost 3–2 at home. Debrecen were eliminated from the UEFA Cup by 3–7 on aggregate.

Debrecen won the Hungarian National Championship I 2008–09 after beating their provincial rivals Diósgyőr 3–2 away. Debrecen became the most successful non-Budapest team in Hungary with four Hungarian Championship titles.

The 2009-10 UEFA Champions League qualifying play-off round lineup that qualified for the group stages against PFC Levski Sofia 2-0 at Ferenc Puskás Stadium.

On 15 July 2009 Debreceni VSC beat Kalmar FF 2–0 at home by the goals of Kiss and Varga. In the away match Debrecen lost to the Swedish champion by 3–1, but they qualified for the next round because they won on away goals. In the third round of the Champions League Debrecen played their first match in Estonia against Levadia Tallinn on 29 July 2009. Debrecen won the match thanks to the 70th-minute goal of Leandro. At home in Debrecen on 5 August 2009, the team beat the Estonian champion by 1–0. In the play-offs of the Champions League 2009–10 Debrecen faced with the Bulgarian champion Levski Sofia. The first match was played in Sofia on 19 August 2009, where Debrecen beat the Bulgarian club by 2–1. Although Levski Sofia scored an equalizer, Debrecen were able to respond with a goal which came in the 76th minute by Czvitkovics. Debrecen won the first leg of the play-off in Bulgaria. Debrecen beat Levski Sofia by 2–0 in front of 32,000 spectators and won 4–1 on aggregate. They were drawn in group E of the competition alongside Liverpool, Lyon and Fiorentina. Debrecen played their first ever Champions League group match against Liverpool at Anfield. The only goal of the match was scored by Kuyt. Although Debrecen were unable to get points from the group matches, their supporters could experience the atmosphere of the Champions League.

== 2010s ==
In 2010 Debrecen was competing for the title with Videoton In the last round the difference between the two teams were only one point. Videoton had to beat Győri ETO away, while Debreceni VSC had to beat Kecskeméti TE away. Neither Videoton nor Debrecen were able to win in the last round, therefore the difference remained one point. As a consequence, Debreceni VSC won the Hungarian National Championship I 2009–10 despite losing to Kecskeméti TE in the last round. In 2010 Debrecen beat Zalaegerszegi TE in the Hungarian Cup final in the Puskás Ferenc Stadium by 3–2.

In 2010 Debrecen beat Levadia Tallinn 4–3 on aggregate in the second round of the UEFA Champions League 2010–11. In the third round they lost to FC Basel 5–1 on aggregate. Debrecen were eliminated yet again. Debrecen consoled themselves in the UEFA Europa League 2010–11. Debrecen beat Litex Lovech 4–1 on aggregate reaching the group stages of the Europa League. Debrecen were drawn in group I of the competition alongside PSV Eindhoven, Sampdoria, and Metalist Kharkiv. Debrecen finally obtained their first points in the Europa League. Péter Kabát's two goals were enough to beat Sampdoria by 2–0. However, these three point were not enough to qualify for the knockout phase of the Europa League 2010-11.

Elemér Kondás was appointed as the new manager of the club on 20 April 2011. In the 2011–12 the team started with a seven consecutive wins. The record run was stopped by a draw against Siófok. On 1 May 2012 Debrecen beat MTK Budapest on penalty shoot-out in the 2011–12 season of the Hungarian Cup final winning the trophy for the fifth time. On 12 May 2012 Debrecen beat Pécs in the 28th round of the Hungarian League by 4–0 at the Oláh Gábor út Stadium which resulted the sixth Hungarian League title for the Hajdús. Debrecen finished the 2011–12 season of the Hungarian League unbeaten with 22 victories and only 8 draws.

In the UEFA Champions League 2012–13 season Debrecen faced the Albanian champions Skënderbeu Korçë in the second round of the qualifiers. The first leg was played in Korçë and won by the Albanian champions 1–0, while the second leg was played in Nyíregyháza (the home of Nyíregyháza Spartacus) since Stadion Oláh Gábor Út did not meet UEFA requirements. In the second leg Coulibaly scored twice, while Varga resulting the 3–1 victory on aggregate over Skënderbeu. In the third round Debrecen faced the Belarus champions BATE Borisov. The first leg was played in Borisov and ended with Sidibe's two goals, one for Debrecen and a late own goal in the 93rd minute. The second leg was won by the Belarus club 2–0 in Nyíregyháza which resulted the farewell of the club from the UEFA Champions League 2012–13 season. Hungarian defender Nikolov was sent off in the 57th minute which resulted the breakdown of Debrecen. The adieu from the Champions League meant an entry to the play-offs of the UEFA Europa League 2012–13 season. Debrecen faced with the Belgian club Club Brugge who they met in the early 2000s. The first leg was played in Nyíregyháza and the match was won by Brugge 3–0. Debrecen could withstand the attacks of the Belgian club until the expulsion of Luis Ramos in the 45th minute. In the second leg Debrecen lost 4–1 in the Jan Breydel Stadium, Bruges. Rezes's expulsion in the 40th minute resulted a hopeless second half for the club. Debrecen were eliminated 7–1 on aggregate.

On 22 May 2013, Győr could have double their success by winning the 2012–13 Magyar Kupa against Debrecen at the Bozsik Stadion, Budapest. Győr was winning by 1–0 thanks to the goal by Nemanja Andrić in the 19th minute but in the second half Debrecen's Adamo Coulibaly scored two goals which resulted Debrecen's victory over Győr in the Hungarian Cup final.

On 18 July Debrecen played against Strømsgodset in the second qualifying round of the UEFA Europa League 2013–14 season. The first leg ended in a 2–2 tie in Drammen, Norway. The second leg was played on 25 July 2013 at the Városi Stadion in Nyíregyháza since Debrecen's stadium was under construction. The match ended in a 3–0 loss for the local team. The Hungarian Péter Kovács of Stromsgodset scored twice in the two-legged encounter.

Debrecen won the 2013–14 season of the Hungarian League. As a consequence, Debrecen were eligible for entering the second round of the UEFA Champions League 2014–15 season. On 15 July 2014, the first leg ended with a goalless drew against Cliftonville at Solitude in Belfast, Northern Ireland.

In the 2014–15 Nemzeti Bajnokság I season, Debrecen finished fourth. Debrecen were eligible for entering the 2015–16 UEFA Europa League season. In the first round, Debrecen beat 3–0 the Montenegrin FK Sutjeska Nikšić at the Nagyerdei Stadion on 2 July 2015.

In the 2016–17 Nemzeti Bajnokság I Debrecen finished their contract with Elemér Kondás and he was replaced by András Herczeg as an interim coach on 25 July 2016. On 8 August 2016, the Portuguese Leonel Pontes was appointed as the manager of the club. The Portuguese manager won 8 matches and drew 7 seven times, while lost 13 times in the 2016–17 Nemzeti Bajnokság I season. Debrecen were twice in the relegation zone during the 38 matches. In the 2016–17 Magyar Kupa Debrecen lost to Győri ETO FC on 14 September 2016 among the bet 128 teams. On 22 May 2017, Pontes left the club with mutual agreement and he was replaced by András Herczeg for the last round against Diósgyőri VTK to escape from the relegation.

On 8 June 2017, it was confirmed by director board of Debrecen that interim manager, Herczeg, remains the manager of Debrecen. Previously he won two Nemzeti Bajnokság I titles, two Magyar Kupa titles, two Szuperkupa titles and managed to qualify for the Champions League group stage.

On 11 July 2017, the new kit was presented in a pub in Debrecen. Géza Róka, club director, said that the club should not be diverted from their road. Debrecen can be successful again only if they should hire football players and coaches who have strong ties with the club.

On 30 December 2019, Zoltán Viteki was appointed as the manager of the club.

== 2020s ==
On the 27th match day Debrecen drew with Kaposvári Rákóczi FC at the Nagyerdei Stadion. After the match Zoltán Vitelki was sacked. On 7 June 2020, Elemér Kondás was appointed as the manager of the club. On the last match day Debrecen hosted Paksi FC. The final result was 1-1 which resulted the relegation of the club to the Nemzeti Bajnokság II. At the end of the season, Gábor Szima, the owner of the clubs, also sold his shares to the local government of Debrecen.

In the summer of 2020, Debrecen signed some of their former players including Mihály Korhut, József Varga, Ádám Pintér, and Bence Sós.

Debrecen beat DEAC in the second match day of the 2020-21 Nemzeti Bajnokság II.

Balázs Dzsudzsák was appointed as the captain of the team.

On 16 February 2021, Szabolcs Huszti and Gábor Toldi were appointed as the manager of the club.

In February 2021, the new management debuted in the 2020-21 Nemzeti Bajnokság II beating Szeged-Csanád Grosics Akadémia 5–0 at the Szent Gellért Fórum. On the 26th match day, on 27 February 2021, Debrecen suffered a shocking defeat (1−2) against Vasas SC at Nagyerdei Stadion. Róbert Feczesin scored the winning goal in the last minute of the match.

On 9 March 2021, Hungary national football team and former Szombathelyi Haladás, Budapesti Honvéd FC player, Roland Ugrai, was signed by the club.

On 16 May 2021, Debrecen beat Szombathelyi Haladás at Nagyerdei Stadion 4–2. The victory against Haladás meant that Debrecen won the 2020-21 Nemzeti Bajnokság II season and were promoted to the Nemzeti Bajnokság I after spending one year in the second league.

On 25 July 2021, Debrecen played against Serie A club A.S. Roma at the Stadio Benito Stirpe in Frosinone. The training match was won by the Italian club 5–2.

On 31 July 2021, on the first match day of the 2021–22 Nemzeti Bajnokság I season Debrecen were hosted by Budapest Honvéd FC. Debrecen beat Honvéd 4–1 at the newly built Bozsik Aréna. Although Bőle took the lead in the 36th minute, Dzsudzsák, Bárány, Bévárdi and Ugrai scored in the second half.

On 8 November 2021, Joan Carrillo was appointed as the manager of the club. He managed Fehérvár FC previously. On 20 November 2021, Carillo debuted with a 3–1 defeat against Újpest FC at the Szusza Ferenc Stadion.

On 27 June 2022, João Janeiro, previously managed Kisvárda, was appointed as the manager of the club. After four draws and 2 lost matches, he was sacked on 31 August 2022. His last match was a 4–2 defeat against Zalaegerszegi TE on 30 August 2022. On the 32nd match day of the 2022–23 Nemzeti Bajnokság I, Debrecen beat the champions, Ferencváros, 3–1 at the Ferencváros Stadion. On the 33rd match day, Debrecen beat Újpest FC 2-0 and finished 3rd in the 2022–23 Nemzeti Bajnokság I.

Deberecen finished in the fifth position in the 2023–24 Nemzeti Bajnokság I season.

Although Debrecen started the 2024–25 Nemzeti Bajnokság I season with a 3–0 away victory against Győr on 2 August 2024, in the following three matches the club could collect only one point against Kecskemét (1-1) and lost to Diósgyőr (1–0) and Újpest (3–0). Therefore, Srđan Blagojević was dismissed on 26 August 2024.

On 30 August 2024, Csaba Máté was appointed as the manager of the club. He previously manager Ferencváros as an interim manager. On 21 September 2024, Máté debuted with a 3–2 defeat against Nyíregyháza at the Városi Stadion. On 28 September, Máté's debut at the Nagyerdei Stadion ended with a 3–2 defeat against MTK Budapest FC. Máté also lost his three Nemzeti Bajnokság I matches in October. First Debrecen lost to Puskás Akadémia at the Pancho Aréna on 4 October 2024. On 19 October 2024, Debrecen suffered a humiliating defeat at home (0-5) against Paks. Máté's last league match was a 2–0 defeat against Fehérvár at the Sóstói Stadion on October 26 2024. The following day, on 27 October 2024, Csaba Máté was sacked. On 28 October 2024, Tibor Dombi was appointed as the interim manager. On 29 October 2024, Dombi-led Debrecen were defeated by Mezőkövesdi SE and were eliminated from the 2024–25 Magyar Kupa season.

On 11 November 2024, Nestor El Maestro was appointed as the manager of the club. On 14 June 2025, El Maestro left the club by mutual consent.

On 17 June 2025, Sergio Navarro was appointed as the manager of the club. Previously, he managed the academy of Athletic Bilbao.

In January 2026, Stott Capital, an English investment firm owned by Stockport County F.C. owner and chairman Mark Stott, acquired a controlling stake in Debrecen. Stott said the two clubs will operate "entirely independently", describing Debrecen as "one of the country's most established clubs, with a proud history, a strong talent pipeline, and experience in European competition".

Debrecen finished in the fourth place in the 2025–26 Nemzeti Bajnokság I and therefore qualified for the 2026–27 UEFA Conference League. On 16 May 2026, Sergio Navarro left the club on mutual consent.

On 3 June 2026, Gert Remmel was appointed as the manager of the club. Rasmus Jansson and Ednardo Monteiro also joined the managerial team. Debrecen started the 2026-27 season with a 1-0 victory over FC Pyunik in the second round of the 2026–27 UEFA Conference League qualifying. After the match, manager of Pyunik said that the Armenian club has a great chance to advance to the next round, while Debrecen's manager, Gert Remmel, said that the performance was far from perfect and a difficult match is expected in Yerevan. The second tie ended with a goalless draw at the Vazgen Sargsyan Republican Stadium in Yerevan.
