= 2016–17 Nemzeti Bajnokság I =

Nemzeti Bajnokság I
- Season: 2016–17
- Dates: 16 July 2016 – 27 May 2017
- Champions: Honvéd
- Relegated: MTK; Gyirmót
- Champions League: Honvéd
- Europa League: Videoton; Vasas; Ferencváros
- Matches: 198
- Goals: 518 (2.62 per match)
- Top goalscorer: Márton Eppel (16 goals)
- Biggest home win: Honvéd 5–0 MTK; Paks 5–0 Mezőkövesd
- Biggest away win: Gyirmót 0–4 Videoton; Gyirmót 0–4 Honvéd; Mezőkövesd 1–5 Honvéd
- Highest scoring: Ferencváros 6–2 Diósgyőr; Újpest 4–4 Diósgyőr
- Longest winning run: 5 games Honvéd
- Longest unbeaten run: 10 games Újpest
- Longest winless run: 12 games Gyirmót
- Longest losing run: 8 games Gyirmót
- Highest attendance: 11,760; Ferencváros 3–3 Újpest (24 September 2016)
- Lowest attendance: 316; MTK 1–0 Haladás (7 August 2016)
- Total attendance: 537,893
- Average attendance: 2,717
- All statistics correct as of 30 May 2017.

The 2016–17 Nemzeti Bajnokság I, also known as NB I, is the 118th season of top-tier football in Hungary. The league is officially named OTP Bank Liga for sponsorship reasons. Ferencváros were the defending champions having won their twenty-ninth Hungarian championship last season. As in the previous season, 12 teams compete for the championship title, playing 33 rounds. The fixtures were published on 14 June 2016.

== Teams ==
Puskás Akadémia and Békéscsaba finished the 2015–16 season in the last two places and thus were relegated to NB II division.

The two relegated teams were replaced with the top two teams in 2015–16 NB II, champion Gyirmót and runner-up Mezőkövesd, each having the required licence for top-division play.

=== Stadium and locations ===
Following is the list of clubs competing in 2016–17 Nemzeti Bajnokság I, with their location, stadium and stadium capacity.

Team	Location	Stadium	Capacity	Ref
Debrecen	Debrecen	Nagyerdei Stadion	20,340	
Diósgyőr	Miskolc	Diósgyőri Stadion ^{1}	9,345	
Diósgyőr	Mezőkövesd	Városi Stadion	5,000	
Diósgyőr	Debrecen	Nagyerdei Stadion	20,340	
Ferencváros	Budapest (Ferencváros)	Groupama Aréna	23,700	
Gyirmót	Győr	Ménfői úti Stadion	4,000	
Haladás	Sopron	Káposztás utcai Stadion ^{2}	5,300	
Honvéd	Budapest (Kispest)	Bozsik József Stadion	10,000	
Mezőkövesd	Mezőkövesd	Városi Stadion	5,000	
MTK	Dunaújváros	Eszperantó úti Stadion	12,000	
MTK	Budapest (Józsefváros)	Hidegkuti Nándor Stadion ^{3}	5,322	
Paks	Paks	Fehérvári úti Stadion	6,150	
Újpest	Budapest (Újpest)	Illovszky Rudolf Stadion	9,000	
Újpest	Budapest (Újpest)	Szusza Ferenc Stadion ^{4}	13,501	
Újpest	Kecskemét	Széktói Stadion	6,300	
Vasas	Budapest (Angyalföld)	Illovszky Rudolf Stadion ^{5}	9,000	
Vasas	Budapest (Angyalföld)	Szusza Ferenc Stadion	13,501	
Videoton	Felcsút	Pancho Aréna ^{6}	3,816	

Notes

- Note 1: Diósgyőr's original stadium, Diósgyőri Stadion (1939) was demolished in 2016, while their proposed stadium, Diósgyőri Stadion is under construction. Therefore, Diósgyőr played their home matches in Városi Stadion and Nagyerdei Stadion.
- Note 2: Haladás's original stadium, Rohonci úti Stadion was demolished in 2016, while their proposed stadium, Haladás Sportkomplexum is under construction. Therefore, Haladás played their home matches at the Káposztás utcai Stadion, in Sopron.
- Note 3: MTK's original stadium, Hidegkuti Nándor Stadion (1947) was demolished in 2014, while their proposed stadium, Hidegkuti Nándor Stadion was opened on 22 October 2016.
- Note 4: Újpest's original stadium, Szusza Ferenc Stadion was renovated.
- Note 5: Vasas's original stadium, Illovszky Rudolf Stadion (1960) was demolished, while their proposed stadium, Illovszky Rudolf Stadion is under construction.
- Note 6: Videoton's original stadium, Sóstói Stadion (1967) was demolished in 2016, while their proposed stadium, Sóstói Stadion is under construction.

Debrecen	Diósgyőr	Ferencváros	Gyirmót
Nagyerdei Stadion	Diósgyőri Stadion	Groupama Aréna	Ménfői úti Stadion
Capacity: 20,340	Capacity: 9,345	Capacity: 23,700	Capacity: 4,000
Haladás	Location of teams in 2016–17 Nemzeti Bajnokság I Location of Budapest teams		Honvéd
Káposztás utcai Stadion	Location of teams in 2016–17 Nemzeti Bajnokság I Location of Budapest teams		Bozsik József Stadion
Capacity: 5,300	Location of teams in 2016–17 Nemzeti Bajnokság I Location of Budapest teams		Capacity: 10,000
Mezőkövesd	Location of teams in 2016–17 Nemzeti Bajnokság I Location of Budapest teams		MTK
Városi-Stadion	Location of teams in 2016–17 Nemzeti Bajnokság I Location of Budapest teams		Hidegkuti Nándor Stadion
Capacity: 5,000	Location of teams in 2016–17 Nemzeti Bajnokság I Location of Budapest teams		Capacity: 5,322
Paks	Újpest	Vasas	Videoton
Fehérvári úti Stadion	Szusza Ferenc Stadion	Illovszky Rudolf Stadion	Pancho Aréna
Capacity: 6,150	Capacity: 13,501	Capacity: 9,000	Capacity: 3,816

=== Personnel and kits ===
Following is the list of clubs competing in 2016–17 Nemzeti Bajnokság I, with their manager, captain, kit manufacturer and shirt sponsor.
Note: Flags indicate national team as has been defined under FIFA eligibility rules. Players and Managers may hold more than one non-FIFA nationality.

Team	Manager		Captain		Kit manufacturer	Shirt sponsor
Team		Name		Name	Kit manufacturer	Shirt sponsor
Debrecen	(Hungary)	András Herczeg	(Hungary)	Dániel Tőzsér	adidas	TEVA
Diósgyőr	(Hungary)	Tamás Bódog	(Hungary)	None	Nike	Borsodi
Ferencváros	(Germany)	Thomas Doll	(Hungary)	Dániel Böde	Nike	Magyar Telekom
Gyirmót	(Hungary)	István Urbányi	(Hungary)	Attila Simon	Jako	Alcufer
Haladás	(Hungary)	Géza Mészöly	(Hungary)	Péter Halmosi	adidas	Swietelsky
Honvéd	(Italy)	Marco Rossi	(Hungary)	Patrik Hidi	Macron	–
Mezőkövesd	(Slovakia)	Mikuláš Radványi	(Hungary)	Dávid Hegedűs	adidas	Cronus, Zsóry
MTK	(Hungary)	Zsolt Tamási	(Hungary)	József Kanta	Nike	Panzi Pet
Paks	(Hungary)	Aurél Csertői	(Hungary)	Tamás Báló	Jako	–
Újpest	(Serbia)	Nebojša Vignjević	(Hungary)	Szabolcs Balajcza	Joma	–
Vasas	(Germany)	Michael Oenning	(Hungary)	András Debreceni	adidas	Alprosys
Videoton	(Norway)	Henning Berg	(Hungary)	Roland Juhász	adidas	MOL

==== Managerial changes ====
Team	Outgoing manager	Manner of departure	Date of vacancy	Position in table	Replaced by	Date of appointment
Videoton	(Hungary) Ferenc Horváth	Contract terminated	End of 2015–16 season	Pre-season	(Norway) Henning Berg	5 May 2016
Gyirmót	(Hungary) Ferenc Bene	Contract terminated	End of 2015–16 season	Pre-season	(Hungary) István Urbányi	16 June 2016
Diósgyőr	(Hungary) Sándor Egervári	Resigned	26 June 2016	Pre-season	(Hungary) Ferenc Horváth	30 June 2016
Debrecen	(Hungary) Elemér Kondás	Mutual consention	25 July 2016	10th	(Hungary) András Herczeg	25 July 2016
Debrecen	(Hungary) András Herczeg	Caretaker	7 August 2016	4th	(Portugal) Leonel Pontes	8 August 2016
MTK	(Hungary) Vaszilisz Teodoru	Mutual agreement	20 December 2016	11th	(Hungary) Zsolt Tamási	20 December 2016
Mezőkövesd	(Hungary) Attila Pintér	Signed by Puskás Akadémia	22 December 2016	5th	(Hungary) Tomislav Sivić	27 December 2016
Diósgyőr	(Hungary) Ferenc Horváth	Sacked	2 March 2017	10th	(Hungary) Zoltán Vitelki	2 March 2017
Diósgyőr	(Hungary) Zoltán Vitelki	End of caretaker spell	13 March 2017	11th	(Hungary) Tamás Bódog	2 March 2017
Mezőkövesd	(Hungary) Tomislav Sivić	Sacked	2 May 2017	8th	(Slovakia) Mikuláš Radványi	2 May 2017
Debrecen	(Portugal) Leonel Pontes	Sacked	22 May 2017	9th	(Hungary) András Herczeg	22 May 2017

== League table ==
Pos	Team	Pld	W	D	L	GF	GA	GD	Pts	Qualification or relegation
1	Honvéd (C)	33	20	5	8	55	30	+25	65	Qualification for the Champions League second qualifying round
2	Videoton	33	18	8	7	65	28	+37	62	Qualification for the Europa League first qualifying round (Note: Ferencváros qualified for the Europa League first qualifying round by winning the 2016–17 Magyar Kupa.)
3	Vasas	33	15	7	11	50	40	+10	52	Qualification for the Europa League first qualifying round
4	Ferencváros	33	14	10	9	54	44	+10	52	Qualification for the Europa League first qualifying round
5	Paks	33	11	12	10	41	37	+4	45	
6	Haladás	33	12	7	14	42	46	−4	43	
7	Újpest	33	10	12	11	47	51	−4	42	
8	Debrecen	33	11	8	14	42	46	−4	41	
9	Mezőkövesd	33	10	10	13	39	54	−15	40	
10	Diósgyőr	33	10	7	16	39	58	−19	37	
11	MTK (R)	33	8	13	12	26	36	−10	37	Relegation to the Nemzeti Bajnokság II
12	Gyirmót (R)	33	5	9	19	21	51	−30	24	Relegation to the Nemzeti Bajnokság II

Source: Hungarian Football Federation (in Hungarian), Soccerway
Rules for classification: 1) Points; 2) Matches won; 3) Goal difference; 4) Goals scored; 5) Head-to-head points; 6) Head-to-head goal difference; 7) Head-to-head away goals scored; 8) Fairplay; 9) Draw.
(C) Champions; (R) Relegated

=== Positions by round ===
Team ╲ Round	1	2	3	4	5	6	7	8	9	10	11	12	13	14	15	16	17	18	19	20	21	22	23	24	25	26	27	28	29	30	31	32	33
Honvéd	2	4	6	3	3	5	5	6	5	5	5	5	5	4	4	4	4	3	2	2	1	2	2	2	1	2	1	1	1	1	1	1	1
Videoton	9	8	11	9	7	7	6	4	4	4	2	3	2	3	2	2	2	2	1	1	2	1	1	1	2	1	2	2	2	2	2	2	2
Vasas	4	1	2	2	1	1	1	1	1	1	1	1	1	1	1	1	1	1	3	3	3	3	3	3	3	3	3	3	3	4	4	3	3
Ferencváros	1	2	1	1	2	2	2	2	2	2	3	4	3	2	3	3	3	4	4	4	4	4	4	4	4	4	5	4	4	3	3	4	4
Paks	7	6	8	10	10	9	10	11	11	9	10	11	12	11	10	10	11	9	8	8	7	7	5	6	6	5	6	7	7	6	5	5	5
Haladás	11	11	9	7	6	4	3	3	3	3	4	2	4	5	5	6	5	6	7	7	8	8	6	5	5	6	4	5	5	5	6	6	6
Újpest	12	12	7	5	4	3	4	5	6	6	6	6	6	8	8	7	7	7	6	6	6	6	7	7	7	7	7	6	6	7	7	7	7
Debrecen	6	5	4	8	9	11	11	8	8	10	11	8	7	6	6	5	6	5	5	5	5	5	8	8	8	8	8	8	8	10	10	8	8
Mezőkövesd	8	10	5	4	5	6	7	7	7	8	7	7	9	7	7	8	8	8	10	10	11	9	10	9	9	9	9	9	11	8	8	9	9
Diósgyőr	3	3	3	6	8	8	8	10	10	12	12	12	11	12	12	11	9	11	9	9	10	11	11	11	11	11	11	11	10	9	9	10	10
MTK	10	9	12	12	11	10	9	9	9	7	8	9	8	9	9	9	10	10	11	11	9	10	9	10	10	10	10	10	9	11	11	11	11
Gyirmót	5	7	10	11	12	11	12	12	12	11	9	10	10	10	11	12	12	12	12	12	12	12	12	12	12	12	12	12	12	12	12	12	12

Source: mlsz.hu (in Hungarian)
= Leader; = 2016–17 UEFA Europa League First qualifying round; = Relegation to 2016–17 Nemzeti Bajnokság II

== Results ==
In the first 22 rounds each team plays against every other team home-and-away in a round-robin format. In the remaining 11 rounds, the first six placed teams from the previous season will play six matches at home and five matches away, and the other six teams will play five matches at home and six matches away.

=== Rounds 1–22 ===
Home \ Away	DEB	DIÓ	FER	GYI	HON	MEZ	MTK	PAK	HAL	ÚJP	VAS	VID
Debrecen	—	3–0	0–0	4–0	0–1	0–0	1–1	1–1	0–1	2–1	1–2	0–1
Diósgyőr	1–3	—	2–3	1–0	0–3	1–1	2–3	2–0	2–1	2–1	1–1	2–0
Ferencváros	3–1	6–2	—	2–0	3–2	2–2	1–1	1–2	3–1	3–3	1–2	0–0
Gyirmót	1–2	1–0	0–1	—	0–4	0–1	0–0	0–0	1–2	1–2	1–0	0–4
Honvéd	1–0	2–0	0–1	0–0	—	1–0	5–0	3–1	2–1	1–1	2–1	1–2
Mezőkövesd	0–1	3–0	2–0	2–2	3–1	—	1–0	1–3	3–0	0–2	0–2	2–1
MTK	1–1	1–0	2–1	1–0	1–2	0–1	—	1–2	0–2	1–1	0–1	1–0
Paks	1–1	2–1	0–0	0–0	1–1	5–0	0–0	—	2–1	1–1	1–0	1–1
Haladás	1–0	3–1	2–0	0–1	1–1	1–1	1–1	3–1	—	0–2	1–0	1–1
Újpest	2–0	4–4	0–1	3–1	0–2	1–1	0–0	1–0	1–1	—	2–2	3–4
Vasas	3–1	3–0	2–2	1–1	2–0	4–0	3–2	1–0	2–3	0–1	—	1–1
Videoton	5–1	1–2	1–1	4–0	3–0	2–0	2–0	5–1	3–0	5–1	1–2	—

Source: Hungarian Football Federation (in Hungarian)
Legend: Blue = home team win; Yellow = draw; Red = away team win.

=== Rounds 23–33 ===
Home \ Away	DEB	DIÓ	FER	GYI	HON	MEZ	MTK	PAK	HAL	ÚJP	VAS	VID
Debrecen	—	—	—	2–1	2–5	—	0–0	1–3	4–2	1–0	—	—
Diósgyőr	1–3	—	—	—	2–0	2–2	—	—	—	3–1	2–1	—
Ferencváros	0–0	1–1	—	—	—	3–1	—	—	3–1	2–0	1–2	—
Gyirmót	—	1–1	2–3	—	—	—	1–0	—	—	—	1–2	0–1
Honvéd	—	—	2–1	1–0	—	—	2–1	2–0	—	—	—	1–0
Mezőkövesd	2–1	—	—	1–1	1–5	—	—	3–2	—	1–3	—	—
MTK	—	0–0	1–3	—	—	2–0	—	—	0–0	—	1–0	1–1
Paks	—	0–1	3–1	3–0	—	—	1–1	—	—	—	—	0–0
Haladás	—	2–0	—	1–2	0–1	4–2	—	2–0	—	—	2–2	—
Újpest	—	—	—	2–2	1–1	—	1–2	1–1	2–1	—	—	0–3
Vasas	2–3	—	—	—	1–0	1–1	—	0–3	—	2–3	—	—
Videoton	3–2	2–0	4–1	—	—	1–1	—	—	2–0	—	1–2	—

Source: Hungarian Football Federation (in Hungarian)
Legend: Blue = home team win; Yellow = draw; Red = away team win.
For upcoming matches, an "a" indicates there is an article about the rivalry between the two participants.

== Season statistics ==
=== Top goalscorers ===
Rank	Player	Club	Goals
1	(Hungary) Márton Eppel	Honvéd	16
2	(Serbia) Marko Šćepović	Videoton	13
3	(North Macedonia) Enis Bardhi	Újpest	12
4	(Hungary) László Bartha	Paks	11
4	(Hungary) Dániel Böde	Ferencváros	11
4	(Italy) Davide Lanzafame	Honvéd	11
4	(Australia) David Williams	Haladás	11
8	(Serbia) Danko Lazović	Videoton	10
9	(Hungary) Sándor Torghelle	MTK	9
9	(Hungary) Bálint Gaál	Haladás (7); Vasas (2)	9
11	(Austria) Marco Djuricin	Ferencváros	8
11	(Hungary) Róbert Feczesin‡	Videoton	8
11	(Hungary) Zoltán Gera	Ferencváros	8
11	(Hungary) Gábor Molnár	Mezőkövesd	8

Updated to games played on 27 May 2017

‡ Feczesin was transferred to Jeonnam Dragons on 6 January 2017.

=== Hat-tricks ===
Name	For	Against	Round	Result	Date
(Hungary) Zoltán Gera	Ferencváros	Gyirmót	28th	2–3	22 April 2017
(Hungary) Márk Koszta	Honvéd	Debrecen	32nd	2–5	20 May 2017

== Attendances ==
Pos	Team	Total	High	Low	Average	Change
1	Ferencváros	48,493	11,760	5,198	6,928	−10.5%
2	Diósgyőr	31,179	8,052	2,472	4,454	+27.1%
3	Vasas	26,939	5,045	2,832	3,848	+99.7%
4	Debrecen	21,261	4,091	1,685	3,037	+0.9%
5	Újpest	18,300	3,500	1,500	2,614	−7.4%^{4}
6	Mezőkövesd	14,448	3,248	1,215	2,064	+34.9%^{1}
7	Honvéd	14,051	2,832	1,180	2,007	+17.3%
8	Videoton	13,673	3,112	1,423	1,953	−1.8%^{5}
9	Haladás	13,245	4,138	1,118	1,892	−32.4%^{2}
10	Gyirmót	13,013	4,200	800	1,859	+36.0%^{1}
11	Paks	11,102	4,217	623	1,586	+21.7%
12	MTK	4,768	1,183	316	681	−12.5%^{3}
	League total	33,266	11,760	316	2,694	+3.5%

Updated to games played on 17 July 2016
Source: League matches: NB I 2016/2017 / NB I 2015/16: attendances, NB II 2015/16: attendances
Notes:
1: Team played last season in NB II
2: Haladás play their home matches in Káposztás utcai Stadion (Sopron), because Rohonci úti Stadion is under reconstruction
3: MTK played their home matches in Eszperantó úti Stadion (Dunaújváros), because Hidegkuti Nándor Stadion is under reconstruction until Round 13 (2016.10.22.)
4: Újpest play their home matches in Illovszky Rudolf Stadion, because Szusza Ferenc Stadion is under reconstruction
5: Videoton play their home matches in Pancho Arena (Felcsút), because Sóstói Stadion is under reconstruction

== Number of teams by counties ==
	County	No. teams	Teams
1	Budapest (capital)	5	Ferencváros, Honvéd, MTK, Újpest and Vasas
2	Borsod-Abaúj-Zemplén	2	Diósgyőr and Mezőkövesd
3	Fejér	1	Videoton
3	Győr-Moson-Sopron	1	Gyirmót
3	Hajdú-Bihar	1	Debrecen
3	Tolna	1	Paks
3	Vas	1	Haladás

== See also ==
- 2016–17 Magyar Kupa
- 2017 Magyar Kupa Final
- 2016–17 Nemzeti Bajnokság II
- 2016–17 Nemzeti Bajnokság III
