= Zsolt Tamási (football manager) =

Hungarian football manager (born 1965)

Personal information
- Date of birth: October 28, 1965 (age 61)
- Place of birth: Győr, Hungary

Youth career
- Years: Team
- Győri ETO FC

Managerial career
- 1990: Győri Elektromos VSK (youth)
- 1992–2000: Győri ETO FC (youth)
- 2001–2003: Győri ETO FC
- 2003–2004: Vasas SC
- 2005–2016: MTK Budapest FC (youth)
- 2016–2017: MTK Budapest FC
- 2017–2018: Győri ETO FC (technical director, youth)
- 2023–2025: Gyirmót FC Győr

Zsolt Tamási (born 28 October 1965 in Győr, Hungary) is a Hungarian football manager. He is known for his work in youth development and for managing several clubs in Hungary, including Győri ETO FC, Vasas SC, MTK Budapest FC, and Gyirmót FC Győr.

== Playing career ==
Tamási began his playing career at Győri ETO FC, but had to retire early due to serious injuries.

== Managerial career ==
His first coaching role came in 1990 with the youth team of Győri Elektromos VSK. Between 1992 and 2000, he worked in the youth system of Győri ETO FC. From 2001 to 2003, he served as the head coach of the club's senior team.

In 2003 he became manager of Vasas SC, leading them to promotion to Nemzeti Bajnokság I in 2004. He left the club later that year.

From 2005 to 2016, he worked at the Sándor Károly Football Academy, affiliated with MTK Budapest FC. He was appointed as head coach of MTK in December 2016.

In June 2017, he was dismissed after MTK was relegated from the first division, and also left the Sándor Károly Academy.

On 9 November 2017, he was appointed technical director of youth development at Győri ETO FC. He remained in that role until 11 October 2018.
