= János Móré =

Hungarian footballer and manager (1910–1992)

Personal information
- Date of birth: 20 June 1910
- Place of birth: Debrecen, Hungary
- Date of death: 27 December 1992 (aged 82)
- Place of death: Debrecen, Hungary
- Height: 1.78 m (5 ft 10 in)
- Position: Forward

Senior career*
Years	Team	Apps	(Gls)
1925–1929	Debreceni		
1929–1933	Bocskai		
1933–1936	Ferencvárosi		
1936–1939	Olympique Lillois		
1939–1940	Bocskai		

International career
1933–1934	Hungary	3	(0)

Managerial career
- 1940–1943: Szolnoki
- 1943–1944: Debreceni
- 1945–1946: Diósgyőri
- 1946–1948: Szolnoki
- 1948–1949: Salgótarjáni
- 1949–1950: Dorogi Tárna
- 1950–1952: Debreceni
- 1953–1955: Nyíregyházi Építők
- 1957–1959: Debreceni
- 1965–1966: Nyíregyháza Spartacus
- * Club domestic league appearances and goals

János Móré (20 June 1910 – 27 December 1992) was a Hungarian footballer who played as a midfielder for Ferencvárosi and the Hungarian national team in the mid-1930s. After retiring, he became a manager, serving as the first-ever coach of Diósgyőri and taking over Debreceni on three occasions.

== Playing career ==
=== Club career ===
Born on 20 June 1910 in Debrecen, Móré began his career at his hometown club Debreceni in 1925, aged 15, with whom he played for four years, until 1929, when he signed for Bocskai, a professional team. He spent most of his first season in reserve status, making his official debut for the club in the cup matches that began in the spring of 1930, starting in the final of the 1929–30 Magyar Kupa on 26 June, helping his side to a 5–1 win over Szegedi Bástya. Due to his height and well-built physique, he mainly played as a central defender, from where he organized attacks through his great understanding of the game, but he also sometimes played in the club's attacking line.

Móré stayed at Bocskai for three years, from 1930 until 1933, when he was signed by Ferencvárosi for 8,000 pengő, making his debut with the first team on 6 August 1933, in an international friendly match against Hertha Berlin, which ended in a 2–5 loss. The following month, on 3 September, he made his official debut in a regional championship match against Nagyszombat, helping his side to a 4–0 win. Initially, he struggled to adapt, spending "hours wandering around Buda in the pouring rain, full of shame and self-blame", and "constantly sullen", but he was eventually able to recover "from his mental crisis".

Together with Gyula Polgár, Gyula Kiss, and György Sárosi, he was a member of the great Ferencvárosi team of the mid-1930s, which won the Hungarian league in 1933–34 and the Magyar Kupa in 1934–35, starting in the final as his side defeated Hungária FC 2–1. He also started in both legs of the final of the 1935 Mitropa Cup, which ended in a aggregate loss to Sparta Prague (3–0). He stayed at Ferencvárosi for three years, from 1933 until 1936, scoring a total of 24 goals in 130 official matches, three of which as a member of the FTC mixed team.

After leaving Ferencvárosi, Móré signed for French club Olympique Lillois, with whom he played the 1939 Coupe de France final at Colombes, which ended in a 3–1 loss to RC Paris. The following day, the journalists of the French newspaper L'Auto (the forerunner of L'Équipe) described him as a "sharp, skillful, and precise center-half". His career in France was then interrupted by the outbreak of the Second World War, so he returned to Bocskai, which dissolved in 1940 due to its financial situation.

=== International career ===
On 2 July 1933, the 23-year-old Móré made his international debut for Hungary in a friendly against Sweden in Stockholm, which ended in a 5–2 loss; the local press noted that his performance was mediocre. The following year, in April 1934, he earned a further two caps, including an appearance in the Central European Cup against Czechoslovakia in Prague, which ended in a 2–2 draw. He was part of the larger Hungarian squad that was preparing to compete in the 1934 FIFA World Cup in Italy, but was ultimately not called up.

== Managerial career ==
Shortly after retiring in 1940, Móré took over Szolnoki as a coach, and even though he had no coaching qualifications, he was able to lead them to a fourth-place finish in the championship as well as the 1940–41 Magyar Kupa, beating Salgótarjáni 3–0 in the final. He also took over Debreceni on three different occasions (1943–44, 1950–52, and 1957–59), with his last managerial work being at the helm of Nyíregyháza Spartacus in the 1965–66 season.

== Later life ==
In an interview published in Hajdú-Bihari Napló in December 1985, Móré stated that his many experiences would not fit into a single newspaper article. According to him, he visited 24 countries, meeting the King of Sweden, who presented him with gold cufflinks, as well as the President of France, who shook his hand; the latter occasion took place most likely after the 1939 Cup final at Colombes. He also stated that he was invited to Hollywood as an actor, but there is no evidence of this.

== Death ==
Móré died in Debrecen on 27 December 1992, at the age of 82.

== Honours ==
Ferencvárosi

- Nemzeti Bajnokság I
  - Champions (1): 1933–34
  - Runner-up (2): 1934–35 and 1936–37
- Magyar Kupa
  - Champions (1): 1934–35
- Mitropa Cup
  - Champions (1): 1935

Olympique Lillois

- Coupe de France:
  - Runner-up (1): 1938–39
