= Lajos Garamvölgyi =

Hungarian footballer (1952–2008)

Personal information
- Full name: Lajos Garamvölgyi
- Date of birth: 8 April 1952
- Place of birth: Alap, Hungary
- Date of death: 18 August 2008 (aged 56)
- Position: Defender

Senior career*
Years	Team	Apps	(Gls)
1974–1979	Videoton FC		
1979–1982	Debreceni VSC		
1982–1986	Debreceni Kinizsi		

Managerial career
- 1993–1996: Debreceni VSC
- 1996–1998: Zalaegerszegi TE
- 1998–2000: Debreceni VSC
- 2000–2001: Nyíregyháza Spartacus FC
- 2002–2003: Békéscsaba 1912 Előre
- * Club domestic league appearances and goals

Lajos Garamvölgyi (8 April 1952 – 18 August 2008) was a Hungarian football player and manager.

== Career ==
Between 1974 and 1979, he played as a defender for Videoton FC.

== Managerial career ==
=== Debrecen ===
On 1 January 1993, he was appointed as the manager of Debreceni VSC.

=== Zalaegerszeg ===
In 1996, he was appointed as the manager of Zalaegerszegi TE.

=== Debrecen ===
On 26 October 1998, he was appointed as the manager of Debrecen a second time. His biggest success with the club was winning the 1998–99 Magyar Kupa season by beating Tatabányai SC in the final.

== Personal life ==
He died on 18 August 2008 after a long illness. In Debrecen, a memory cup is organized each year to remember him.
