= Gyula Teleki =

Hungarian footballer (1928–2017)

Personal information
- Full name: Gyula Teleki (Tiegelmann)
- Date of birth: 15 February 1928
- Place of birth: Arad, Romania
- Date of death: before 14 June 2017
- Position: Defender

Senior career*
Years	Team	Apps	(Gls)
1946–1950	Debreceni VSC		
1950–1958	Vasas SC		
1958–1959	Debreceni VSC		

International career
1954–1956	Hungary	3	(0)

Managerial career
- 1959–1961: Debreceni VSC
- 1963–1964: Al-Merreikh
- 1966–1967: Pécsi Dózsa SC
- 1968: Diósgyőri VTK
- 1969–1970: Wisła Kraków
- 1973: Iraq
- 1977: Al-Sulaibikhat
- 1978–1980: Debreceni VSC
- 1981: Al-Sulaibikhat
- * Club domestic league appearances and goals

Gyula Teleki (born Gyula Tiegelmann, on 15 February 1928 in Arad – before 14 June 2017) was a Hungarian football player and coach.

Teleki was a talented full back who played three times for the Hungary national team in the mid-1950s, and ended his top flight playing career beating Real Madrid in the European Cup with his club side Vasas SC. He also played for Debreceni VSC.

Teleki coached Debreceni VSC, Al-Merreikh, Pécsi Dózsa SC, Diósgyőri VTK, Wisła Kraków, Iraq and Al-Sulaibikhat.
