= Lajos Puskás =

Hungarian footballer

Personal information
- Date of birth: 13 August 1944 (age 82)
- Place of birth: Tetétlen, Hungary
- Position: Forward

Senior career*
Years	Team	Apps	(Gls)
1964–1974	Vasas SC		

International career
1964–1969	Hungary	7	(1)

Managerial career
- 1977–1979: Debreceni MTE
- 1979–1981: Kaposvári Rákóczi
- 1981–1983: Diósgyőri VTK
- 1983–1984: Csepel SC
- 1985–1987: Debreceni MVSC
- 1987–1988: Dunaújvárosi Kohász
- 1988: Vasas SC
- 1988: Apollon Kalamarias
- 1990: Bajai SK
- * Club domestic league appearances and goals

Lajos Puskás (born 13 August 1944) is a Hungarian football forward who played for Hungary in the 1966 FIFA World Cup. He also played for Vasas SC.
