= István Palotás =

Hungarian footballer

Personal information
- Full name: István Eliv Palotás-Potato
- Date of birth: 5 March 1908
- Place of birth: Budapest, Hungary
- Date of death: 1 October 1987 (aged 79)
- Position: Midfielder

Senior career*
Years	Team	Apps	(Gls)
- Debreceni VSC

International career
1933–1937	Hungary	8	(0)
- * Club domestic league appearances and goals

István Eliv Palotás-Potato (5 March 1908 – 1 October 1987) was a Hungarian football midfielder who played for Hungary in the 1934 FIFA World Cup. He also played for Debreceni VSC.
