= Leonel Pontes =

Portuguese football manager

Personal information
- Full name: Leonel Pontes da Encarnação
- Date of birth: 9 July 1972 (age 54)
- Place of birth: Porto da Cruz, Portugal

Team information
- Current team: SH Shenhua (technical director)

Managerial career
- Years: Team
- 2002–2004: Sporting B (assistant)
- 2004–2005: Sporting CP U19 (assistant)
- 2005–2009: Sporting CP (assistant)
- 2009: Sporting CP (interim)
- 2010–2014: Portugal (assistant)
- 2014–2015: Marítimo
- 2015: Panetolikos
- 2015–2016: Al-Ittihad
- 2016–2017: Debrecen
- 2018–2019: Jumilla
- 2019: Sporting CP (under-23)
- 2019: Sporting CP
- 2021–2022: Sp. Covilhã
- 2023–: SH Shenhua (technical director)

Leonel Pontes da Encarnação (born 9 July 1972) is a Portuguese football manager. He is currently the technical director of Chinese club SH Shenhua.

== Coaching career ==
=== Portugal ===
Born in Porto da Cruz, Madeira, Pontes coached in the youth ranks of Sporting CP from 1996 to 2005, also managing the reserves for two matches in the third tier in February 2003. He became assistant manager of the first team to Paulo Bento in 2005, and assumed interim charge when the latter resigned on 6 November 2009. His sole game in charge was two days later, a 2–2 draw at Rio Ave F.C. in the Primeira Liga. In September 2010, he was made Bento's assistant at the Portugal national football team.

On 8 May 2014, Pontes left for top-flight club C.S. Marítimo of his native island. He resigned the following 2 March, with the team in 11th.

=== Abroad ===
On 9 June 2005, Pontes was hired by Super League Greece club Panetolikos FC, with several compatriots amongst his staff. He was dismissed on 28 September with the team in fifth, with two wins and as many losses from five games.

On 20 November 2015, Pontes was named manager of Al Ittihad Alexandria Club in Egypt. He was sacked the following 9 March, when the team were two places above the relegation zone.

On 8 August 2016, Pontes was appointed as the coach of the Nemzeti Bajnokság I club Debreceni VSC after the resignation of Elemér Kondás. He signed a three-year contract and he brought his compatriot colleague José Maria Calado Pratas with him. On 14 September, the club were eliminated from the 2016–17 Magyar Kupa after a 1–0 defeat at the ETO Park against the Nemzeti Bajnokság III club Győri ETO FC, making them the only Nemzeti Bajnokság I club which could not qualify for the best 64 teams.

On 22 February 2017 Pontes' Debrecen went six games without a win in the 2016–17 Nemzeti Bajnokság I, the first time since 2001–02. On 19 March, director Géza Róka said that they do not issue an ultimatum to sack him. On 22 May, he left the club with mutual agreement and he was replaced by András Herczeg for the last round against Diósgyőri VTK to escape from the relegation.

On 14 July 2018, Pontes was named the new manager of Spanish Segunda División B side FC Jumilla for the upcoming season. The campaign ended the following 2 June with relegation to the Tercera División after a 4–2 aggregate loss to Real Unión.

=== Return home ===
On 21 June 2019, Pontes returned to Sporting, to manage the under-23 team on a two-year contract. He returned to interim charge of the club on 3 September after the dismissal of Marcel Keizer, and eleven days later he was given a two-year contract for the post, ahead of his first game. On 26 September, having drawn once and lost three times in four games across all competitions, he was replaced by Silas.

From December 2022 to October 2023, Pontes was in charge of Sporting da Covilhã.

=== China ===
On 1 August 2023, Pontes was hired as technical director of Chinese club SH Shenhua.
