= Antal Lyka =

Hungarian footballer (1908–1976)

Personal information
- Date of birth: 29 May 1908
- Place of birth: Budapest, Austria-Hungary
- Date of death: 1976
- Position: Midfielder

Senior career*
Years	Team	Apps	(Gls)
1926–1937	Ferencváros	139	(2)

International career
1930–1934	Hungary	12	(0)

Managerial career
- 1946–1947: 14. Oktobar Niš
- 1948–1950: Ferencváros
- 1952–1953: Csepel SC
- 1953–1954: Debreceni VSC
- 1957–1959: Vojvodina
- 1959–1961: Vardar
- 1962–1963: Debreceni VSC
- 1964–1966: Veszprémi Haladás-Petőfi
- 1967–1969: Kecskeméti TE
- * Club domestic league appearances and goals

Antal Lyka (29 May 1908 – 1976) was a Hungarian football player and coach.

== Career ==
A midfielder, Lyka played for Ferencváros in the Hungarian championshiio for over a decade, and capped 12 times for Hungary.

Lyka coached FK 14. Oktobar Niš, Ferencváros, Csepel SC, Debreceni VSC, FK Vojvodina and FK Vardar.

== Honours ==
Ferencváros

- Nemzeti Bajnokság I: 1926–27, 1931–32, 1933–34
- Magyar Kupa: 1927, 1933, 1935
