= Zoltán Vitelki =

Hungarian former professional footballer

Personal information
- Date of birth: 13 September 1970 (age 56)
- Place of birth: Miskolc, Hungary
- Height: 1.88 m (6 ft 2 in)
- Position: Midfielder

Youth career
- Diósgyőr

Senior career*
| Years | Team | Apps | (Gls) |
| 1990–1998 | Diósgyőr | 35 | (3) |
| 1997–1998 | → Kazincbarcika (loan) | | |
| 1998–2000 | Vác | 37 | (3) |
| 2000–2008 | Diósgyőr | 111 | (5) |
| 2008–2010 | Mezőkövesd | 54 | (5) |

Managerial career
- 2015: Diósgyőr
- 2017: Diósgyőr
- 2017–2018: Kazincbarcika
- 2018: Budafok
- 2019–2020: Debrecen
- 2020: Kazincbarcika
- 2021: Eger
- 2021–: Tiszaújváros
- * Club domestic league appearances and goals

Zoltán Vitelki (born 13 September 1970) is a Hungarian football manager and a former player. He is the manager of FC Tiszaújváros.

== Playing career ==
He spent most of his playing career in his hometown, at his youth club in Diósgyőr, but he also played in Kazincbarcika, Vác and Mezőkövesd. He played mostly in the first division, but also in the Nemzeti Bajnokság II.

== Managerial career ==
After his retirement in 2008, he remained close to Diósgyőr football as a youth coach. As a diversion, he played two seasons with the then NB III Mezőkövesd team in the 2008–2009 season. He retired after the 2009–2010 season, in which Mezőkövesd finished 5th in the NB II Eastern Group.

He also worked as a field coach for DVTK from 2010 to 2012, and then from the end of April 2015 he became the head coach of the adult team for 5 matches until the end of the season. He holds a UEFA A license, allowing him to manage the team for 60 days.

On 2 March 2017, following the dismissal of Ferenc Horváth, he was again appointed as caretaker coach for two matches.

From the summer of 2017 to April 2018, he was the head coach of the second division Kazincbarcika.

In June 2018, he became the head coach of the second division Budafoki MTE. He was dismissed after only 14 rounds, on 29 October, after his team was in 18th place in the table, which was relegated.

In December 2019, following the resignation of András Herczeg, Vitelki was appointed head coach of Debrecen. He held this position until June 2020.

After Gábor Boér resigned before the season, he was appointed head coach of Kolorcity Kazincbarcika on 21 July 2020. He left this position in December 2020 due to the team's lack of results.

In March 2021, he signed for NB III team Eger. He left in the summer of 2021.

After that, he got a job with FC Tiszaújváros, which he has been doing continuously in the Nemzeti Bajnokság III since 2021.
