= Elemér Kondás =

Hungarian football manager

Personal information
- Date of birth: 11 September 1963 (age 63)
- Place of birth: Szikszó, Hungary
- Height: 1.78 m (5 ft 10 in)
- Position: Defender

Senior career*
Years	Team	Apps	(Gls)
1980–1984	Borsodi Bányász		
1984–1985	Honvéd Papp SE		
1985–1986	Diósgyőr		
1986–1993	Kazincbarcika		
1993–1995	Debrecen	24	(4)
1995–1998	Hajdúszoboszló	26	(1)

Managerial career
- 2002–2004: Debreceni VSC (assistant)
- 2004–2007: Létavértes
- 2007–2011: Debrecen 2
- 2011–2016: Debreceni VSC
- 2017–2018: Kisvárda F.C.
- 2019: Debreceni EAC
- 2019–2020: Győri ETO
- 2020–2021: Debrecen
- 2021–2022: Diósgyőr
- 2022–2023: Vasas
- * Club domestic league appearances and goals

Elemér Kondás (born 11 September 1963) is a Hungarian football manager and former player.

== Managerial career ==
=== Létavértes ===
Kondás managed Létavértes between 2004 and 2007.

=== Debreceni VSC ===
Kondás was appointed as the manager of Debrecen in 2011. He started the 2011-12 with a seven consecutive wins.

On 25 July 2016, he resigned after a defeat against Vasas SC on the second match day of the 2016–17 Nemzeti Bajnokság I season and after a double defeat in the second qualifying round 2016–17 UEFA Europa League defeat against Torpedo Zhodino. On 8 August 2016, he was replaced by the Portuguese Leonel Pontes.

=== Kisvárda ===
On 31 July 2018, he was sacked after two consecutive defeats in the 2018-19 Nemzeti Bajnokság I season.

=== Győri ETO ===
On 3 December 2019, he has become the manager of Győr.

=== Debrecen ===
On 7 June 2020, he was appointed as the manager of the Debrecen after Zoltán Vitelki was sacked. The club was in relegation zone. Kondás said in an interview that he could have rejected the offer but due his ties to the club he felt responsible.

=== Vasas ===
On 6 September 2022, he was appointed as the coach of Vasas SC.

== Managerial statistics ==
As of 25 July 2016

Team	Nat	From	To	Record							
Team	Nat	From	To	P	W	D	L	GF	GA	GD	W%
Debrecen	Hungary	20 April 2011	25 July 2016	196	111	43	42	381	200	+181	56.6
Kisvárda FC	Hungary	TBA	31 July 2018	43	24	9	10	—	55.8		
Total				196	111	43	42	381	200	+181	56.6

== Sources ==
- Debreceni VSC official website (in Hungarian)
