= András Herczeg =

Hungarian footballer and manager

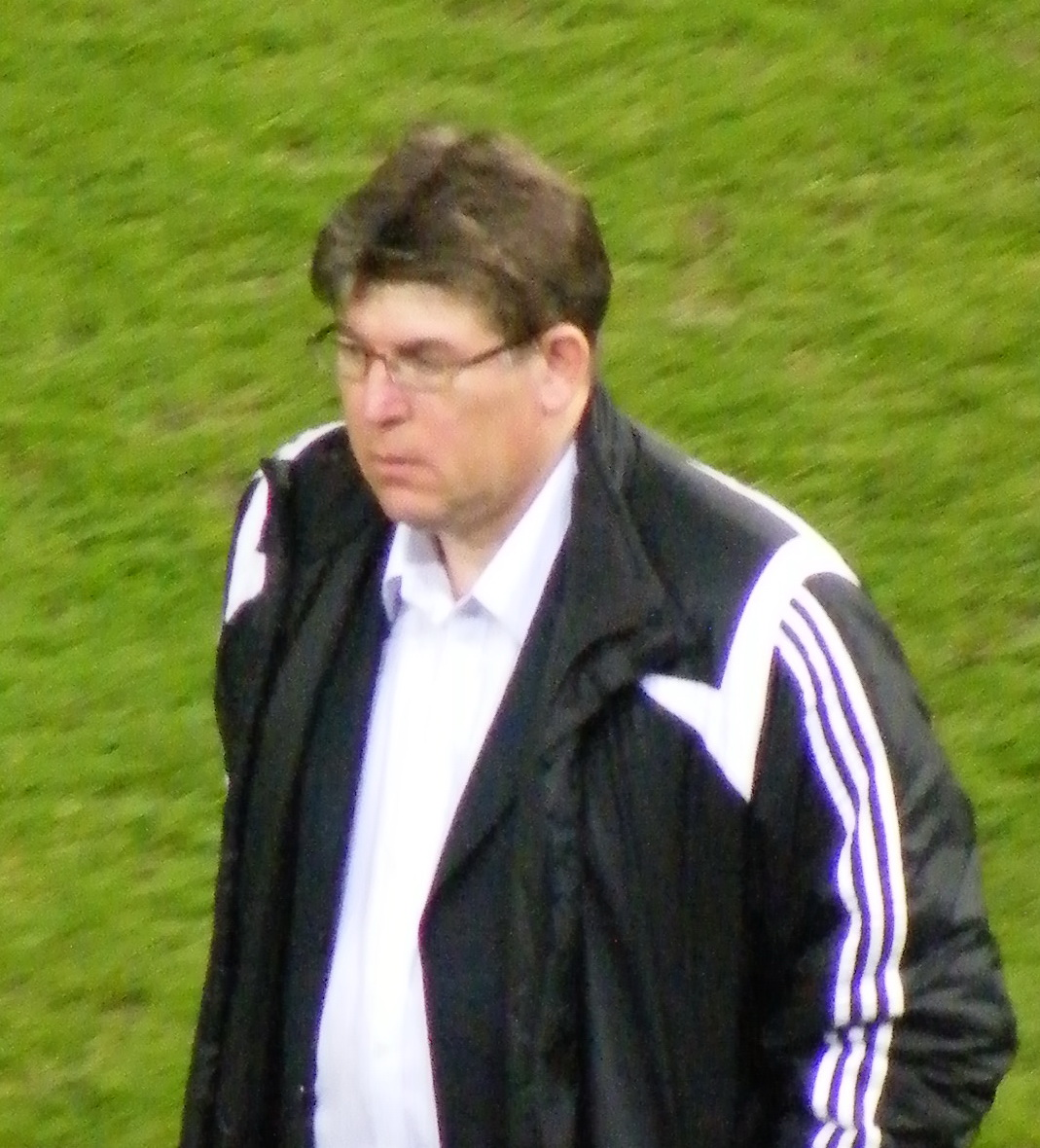

Personal information
- Date of birth: 11 July 1956 (age 70)
- Place of birth: Gyöngyös, Hungary

Youth career
- 1970–1974: Debreceni VSC

Senior career*
Years	Team	Apps	(Gls)
1974–1979	Debreceni VSC		
1979–1981	Honvéd Szabó Lajos SE		
1981	Hajdúböszörményi TE		
1981–1984	Hajdúszoboszlói Bocskai		
1984–1986	Karcag SE		
1986–1988	Hajdúszoboszlói FC		

Managerial career
- 1988–1995: Debrecen (youth)
- 1996–1997: Debreceni VSC (assistant coach)
- 1996–1999: Debreceni VSC
- 1998–1999: Hungary Olympic Team (assistant coach)
- 1999–2000: Debreceni VSC (youth team)
- 2000–2001: FC Tiszaújváros
- 2001–2004: Debreceni VSC (youth team)
- 2001–2004: Létavértes SC
- 2004–2007: Debreceni VSC (assistant coach)
- 2007–2010: Debreceni VSC
- 2016: Debreceni VSC (interim)
- 2017–2019: Debreceni VSC
- * Club domestic league appearances and goals

András Herczeg (born 11 July 1956) is a Hungarian football manager and former player, who is the manager of Debreceni VSC. He worked as the manager of the Debreceni VSC between 2007 and 2010. He led his team to the group stages of the Champions League 2009–10 season and to the group stages of the 2010–11 Europa League season. His team reached their zenith by beating Sampdoria 2–0 at the Puskás Ferenc Stadium in 2010.

== Managerial career ==
=== First era ===
András Herczeg became the manager of Debreceni VSC in 2007. Debreceni VSC won the Hungarian National Championship I in 2009 and 2010 and the Hungarian Cup in 2008 and 2010. During the management of András Herczeg Debrecen reached their zenith by qualifying for the group stages of the 2009–10 UEFA Champions League and in the following year the group stages of the 2010–11 Europa League. Herczeg has been the most successful manager of the Debreceni VSC.

After the resignation of Elemér Kondás, Herceg accepted the appointment of the club to manage Debrecen against Gyirmót FC Győr on the third match day of the 2016–17 Nemzeti Bajnokság I season.

=== Return ===
On 8 June 2017, Debreceni VSC appointed Herczeg as the manager of the club.

== Honours ==
=== As a player ===
Debreceni VSC

- Hungarian National Championship II: 1978–79

=== As a manager ===
Debreceni VSC

- Zilahi Prize: 2011
- Youth Manager of the Year: 1995
- Local Tournament winner with Debreceni SI Youth team: 1995
- Hungarian National Championship I: 2004–05, 2005–06, 2006–07, 2008–09, 2009–10; runner-up 2007–08
- Hungarian Cup: 2007–08, 2009–10; runner-up 2006–07
- Hungarian Super Cup: 2005, 2006, 2007, 2009, 2010; runner-up 2008
- Hungarian League Cup 2010; runner-up: 2008

== Sources ==
- Debreceni VSC official website (in Hungarian)
- Nemzetisport.hu magazine (in Hungarian)
