= 2024–25 Újpest FC season =

Újpest
2024–25 season
- Manager: Damir Krznar (From 5 May 2025)
- Stadium: Szusza Ferenc Stadion
- Nemzeti Bajnokság I: 7th
- Magyar Kupa: Quarter-final
- Top goalscorer: League: Brodić (10); All: Brodić (11)
- Highest home attendance: 10,273 v Ferencváros, 1 Dec. 2024, NB I, R15
- Lowest home attendance: 3,702 v MTK, 1 Mar. 2025, NB I, R22
- Average home league attendance: 5,606
- Biggest win: 7–0 v Dunavarsány (A), 14 Sept. 2024, Magyar Kupa, Round of 64
- Biggest defeat: 1–6 v Paks (A), 14 Mar. 2025, NB I, R24
- All statistics correct as of 24 May 2024.

The 2024–25 season is Újpest Football Club's 144nd competitive season, 133rd consecutive season in the Nemzeti Bajnokság I and 132nd year in existence as a football club. In addition to the domestic league, Újpest participated in this season's editions of the Magyar Kupa.

== Kits ==
Supplier: Puma / Sponsor: MOL / Tippmix

Home	Away	Third

Goalkeeper^{1}	Goalkeeper^{2}	Goalkeeper^{3}

=== Kit usage ===
We indicate in parentheses the number of round.

Kit	Combination							
Kit	Combination	Total			Nemzeti Bajnokság I		Magyar Kupa	
Kit	Combination	Season	Home	Away	Home	Away	Home	Away
Home	White shirt with purple stripes, purple sleeves, white shorts and white socks.	21	17	4	PUS(1) FEH(3) DEB(5) DIO(7) GYO(8) NYI(10) PAK(13) FER(15) KEC(17) ZAL(20) MTK(22) PUS(23) FEH(25) DEB(27) DIO(29) GYO(30) NYI(32)	KEC(6) DIO(18) NYI(21) MTK(33)		
Away	Purple shirt with dark purple horizontal stripes, purple sleeves, purple shorts and purple socks.	7		7		FER(4) PUS(12) DEB(16) GYO(19) FER(26)		DOR(R16) FER(QF)
Third	White shirt, white sleeves, white shorts and white socks.	9		9		PAK(2) ZAL(9) MTK(11) FEH(14) PAK(24) KEC(28) ZAL(31)		DVA(R64) BVS(R32)
Goalkeeper^{1}	Neon orange shirt, neon orange shorts and neon orange socks.	14	6	8	PUS(1) FEH(3) DEB(5) DIO(7) FER(15) DIO(29)	PAK(2) ZAL(9) MTK(11) FEH(14) DEB(16) DIO(18) NYI(21) KEC(28)		
Goalkeeper^{2}	Neon red shirt, neon red shorts and neon red socks.	17	8	9	GYO(8) PAK(13) KEC(17) ZAL(20) MTK(22) PUS(23) DEB(27) GYO(30)	FER(4) PUS(12) PAK(24) FER(26) ZAL(31) MTK(33)		BVS(R32) DOR(R16) FER(QF)
Goalkeeper^{3}	Blue shirt, blue shorts and blue socks.	6	3	3	NYI(10) FEH(25) NYI(32)	KEC(6) GYO(19)		DVA(R64)

BVS: BVSC-Zugló; DEB: Debrecen; DIO: Diósgyőr; DOR: Dorog; DVA: Dunavarsány; FEH: Fehérvár; FER: Ferencváros; GYO: Győr; KEC: Kecskemét; MTK: MTK Budapest; NYI: Nyíregyháza; PAK: Paks; PUS: Puskás Akadémia; ZAL: Zalaegerszeg;
R64: Round of 64; R32: Round of 32; R16: Round of 16; QF: Quarter-final;

== First team squad ==
As of 6 May 2025

Note: Flags indicate national team as defined under FIFA eligibility rules; some limited exceptions apply. Players may hold more than one non-FIFA nationality.

No.	Pos.	Nation	Player
1	GK	HUN	Gellért Genzler
23	GK	HUN	Dávid Banai
93	GK	ITA	Riccardo Piscitelli
3	DF	HUN	Csanád Fehér
4	DF	HUN	Levente Babós
5	DF	GEO	Davit Kobouri
8	DF	HUN	Márk Dékei
22	DF	HUN	Krisztián Tamás
25	DF	HUN	Nimród Baranyai
26	DF	HUN	Bálint Geiger
30	DF	POR	João Nunes
33	DF	HUN	Barnabás Bese
35	DF	POR	André Duarte
44	DF	HUN	Bence Gergényi
55	DF	HUN	Attila Fiola (vice-captain)
74	DF	HUN	Dominik Kaczvinszki
6	MF	POL	Damian Rasak
7	MF	HUN	Krisztián Simon

No.	Pos.	Nation	Player
10	MF	HUN	Mátyás Tajti
15	MF	HUN	Miron Mucsányi
18	MF	FRA	Tom Lacoux
21	MF	HUN	Pál Helmich
29	MF	NGR	Vincent Onovo
37	MF	HUN	Dezső Mező
77	MF	HUN	Adrián Dénes
88	MF	SRB	Matija Ljujić (captain)
9	FW	CRO	Fran Brodić
11	FW	HUN	Krisztofer Horváth
14	FW	GEO	Giorgi Beridze
17	FW	ROU	George Ganea
34	FW	SLO	Milan Tučić
38	FW	HUN	Kristóf Sarkadi
47	FW	HUN	Márk Mucsányi
57	FW	HUN	Ákos Tóth
70	FW	FRA	Mamoudou Karamoko (on loan from (Denmark) Copenhagen)

== Transfers ==
=== Summer ===
In: Note: Flags indicate national team as defined under FIFA eligibility rules; some limited exceptions apply. Players may hold more than one non-FIFA nationality.

No.	Pos.	Nation	Player
25	DF	HUN	Nimród Baranyai (from (Hungary) Debrecen)
74	DF	HUN	Dominik Kaczvinszki (from (Hungary) Budapest Honvéd)
44	DF	POR	Bence Gergényi (from (Hungary) Fehérvár)
30	DF	POR	João Nunes (from (Portugal) Casa Pia)
70	FW	FRA	Mamoudou Karamoko (on loan from (Denmark) Copenhagen)
9	FW	CRO	Fran Brodić (from (Croatia) Varaždin)
35	DF	POR	André Duarte (from (Croatia) Osijek)
18	MF	FRA	Tom Lacoux (from (France) Bordeaux)
55	DF	HUN	Attila Fiola (from (Hungary) Fehérvár)
11	FW	HUN	Krisztofer Horváth (from (Hungary) Kecskemét)
21	MF	HUN	Pál Helmich (from (Hungary) Kecskemét)

Out: Note: Flags indicate national team as defined under FIFA eligibility rules; some limited exceptions apply. Players may hold more than one non-FIFA nationality.

No.	Pos.	Nation	Player
77	FW	HUN	Kevin Csoboth (to (Switzerland) St. Gallen)
19	MF	CIV	Aboubakar Keita (End to contract)
28	MF	HUN	Ognjen Radošević (loan to (Hungary) Nyíregyháza)

=== Winter ===
In: Note: Flags indicate national team as defined under FIFA eligibility rules; some limited exceptions apply. Players may hold more than one non-FIFA nationality.

No.	Pos.	Nation	Player
6	MF	POL	Damian Rasak (from (Poland) Górnik Zabrze)
34	FW	SLO	Milan Tučić (from (Slovenia) Bravo)
14	FW	GEO	Giorgi Beridze (from (Turkey) Kocaelispor)

Out: Note: Flags indicate national team as defined under FIFA eligibility rules; some limited exceptions apply. Players may hold more than one non-FIFA nationality.

No.	Pos.	Nation	Player

=== Out on loan ===
Note: Flags indicate national team as defined under FIFA eligibility rules; some limited exceptions apply. Players may hold more than one non-FIFA nationality.

No.	Pos.	Nation	Player
28	MF	HUN	Ognjen Radošević (at (Hungary) Nyíregyháza until 30 June 2025)

=== New contracts ===
The following Újpest FC players signed their first or new professional contracts with the club.

Date	Age	Pos.	Player	Contract type	Ref.
First team
19 February 2025	37	MF	(Hungary) Dezső Mező	First professional contract	
Academy

=== Management ===
As of 8 May 2025

Position	Name
Manager	(Croatia) Damir Krznar
Assistant manager Video analyst	(Croatia) Vedran Attias
Assistant manager	(Serbia) Nikola Mitrović
Assistant manager	(Slovenia) Ales Mertelj
Assistant manager	(Hungary) Boldizsár Bodor
Goalkeeping coach	(Hungary) András Elbert
Body performance coach	(Croatia) Luka Krklješ
Fitness coach	(Hungary) Ádám Száraz
Video analyst	(Hungary) Samu Varga
Video analyst	(Hungary) Balázs Benczés
Club doctor	(Hungary) Iván Kollár Dr.
Club doctor	(Hungary) Péter Lestár Dr.
Physiotherapist	(Serbia) Žarko Milovanović
Physiotherapist	(Serbia) Aleksandar Jovetić
Physiotherapist	(Hungary) Dorottya Varga
Technical manager	(Hungary) Babett Zsitva
Data analyst	(Hungary) Kornélia Tuza
Kit manager	(Hungary) Tamás Nagy
Masseur	(Hungary) József Kádár
Masseur	(Hungary) Kálmán Hénap

=== Managerial changes ===
Outgoing manager	Manner of departure	Date of vacancy	Position in table	Incoming manager	Date of appointment
(Hungary) Géza Mészöly	End of contract	30 June 2024	Pre-season	(Sweden) Bartosz Grzelak	14 June 2024
(Sweden) Bartosz Grzelak	Sacked	3 May 2025	7th	(Croatia) Damir Krznar	5 May 2025

== Friendlies ==
Win Draw Loss Fixtures

=== Pre-season ===
29 June 2024 Friendly	Komárno (Slovak I) (Slovakia)	1–1	Újpest	Svätý Peter, Slovakia
	N. Tamás 39'	Report	Dékei 72'
Note: ÚJPEST: Banai (Piscitelli) — Bese (Kovács), Fehér (Kaczvinszki), Kobouri (Babós) — Baranyai (K. Simon), Tajti (Mi. Mucsányi), Radošević, N. Tamás (B. Simon) — Ljujić (Kollarik), Má. Mucsányi (Dékei), Dékei (Geiger)

6 July 2024 Friendly	Újpest	3–4	Vasas (NB II)	Budapest
17:00; 2x60 min.	Dékei 5', 54'; Ljujić 18'	Report	Keita 75' (o.g.); Mamusits 105'; Zimonyi 108' (pen.); Pintér 109'	Stadium: Tábor utcai stadium
Note: ÚJPEST 1st half: Piscitelli — Bese, Fehér, Gergényi — K. Simon, Tajti, Geiger, N. Tamás — Ljujić, Radošević — Dékei • ÚJPEST 2nd half: Banai — Kovács, Kaczvinszki, Kobouri — Baranyai, Mi. Mucsányi, Keita, Dénes, B. Simon — Kollarik, Má. Mucsányi

12 July 2024 Friendly	Waldhof Mannheim (Bundesliga III) (Germany)	1–1	Újpest	Euratsfeld, Austria
17:00	Boyd 53'	Report	Ljujić 12'
Note: ÚJPEST: Piscitelli — Bese, Fehér, Gergényi — K. Simon, Tajti (B. Simon), Geiger, N. Tamás — Ljujić, Radošević — Dékei

13 July 2024 Friendly	St. Pölten (Austria II)	0–1	Újpest	St. Pölten, Austria
16:00		Report	Má. Mucsányi 49' (pen.)
Note: ÚJPEST: Banai (Genzler) — Kobouri (Máté), Eckl, Keita (Mi. Mucsányi) — Baranyai, Árki, Mi. Mucsányi (Nunes), Kollarik (Karamoko) — Csoboth (B. Simon), Dénes — Má. Mucsányi

18 July 2024 Friendly	Al-Ahli (Saudi I) (Saudi Arabia)	1–0	Újpest	Austria
	Firmino 11'	Report
Note: ÚJPEST: Piscitelli — Bese, Nunes (Fehér (substituted on) 74'), Gergényi — Baranyai (K. Simon (substituted on) 69'), Tajti (Radošević (substituted on) 69'), Geiger, N. Tamás (Dénes (substituted on) 74') — Ljujić (Keita (substituted on) 79'), Csoboth (Mi. Mucsányi (substituted on) 69') — Karamoko (Dékei (substituted on) 74')

=== In-season ===
7 September 2024 Friendly	Dorog (NB III)	0–4	Újpest	Dorog
11:00 CEST		Report	Onovo; Lacoux; Má. Mucsányi; Dékei	Stadium: Buzánszky Jenő Stadion

11 October 2024 Friendly	Újpest	1–0	(Serbia) IMT Beograd (Serbian I)	Budapest
	Brodić 8'	Report		Stadium: Chinoin Sport és szabadidő központ
Note: ÚJPEST: Banai — Baranyai, Duarte (Babós (substituted on) 61'), Kobouri — Simon (Bese (substituted on) 61'), Dékei (Kollarik (substituted on) 82'), Onovo, Ljujić (Lacoux), Gergényi (Sarkadi (substituted on) 70') — Brodić (Tajti (substituted on) 61'), A. Dénes • Manager: Bartosz Grzelak

14 November 2024 Friendly	Blau-Weiß Linz (Austrian I) (Austria)	3–3	Újpest	Linz, Austria
	A. Schmidt 51'; P. Mensah 58'; Seidl 68'	Report	Karamoko 9'; A. Dénes 14'; Nunes 22'	Stadium: Hofmann Personal Stadion
Note: ÚJPEST: Piscitelli — Baranyai (Zs. Máté (substituted on) 83'), Nunes, Kobouri, Kaczvinszki (Eckl (substituted on) 83') — Dékei (Onovo (substituted on) 64') Lacoux — A. Dénes, Ljujić (c), Karamoko (Má. Mucsányi (substituted on) 64') — Brodić (Sarkadi (substituted on) 83') • Manager: Bartosz Grzelak

10 January 2025 Friendly	Újpest	0–0	Budafok (NB II)	Budapest
		Report		Stadium: Tábor utcai stadion
Note: ÚJPEST 1st half: Piscitelli — Dékei, Tajti, Kr. Horváth, Lacoux, Baranyai, Duarte, Gergényi, Má. Mucsányi, Kaczvinszki, A. Dénes • ÚJPEST 2nd half: Banai — Mező, B. Simon, Brodić, Onovo, Karamoko, Nunes, Kobouri, Eckl, Naruki, K. Simon • Manager: Bartosz Grzelak

Winter training camp in Murcia, Spain between 12–23 January 2025.

14 January 2025 Friendly	Hajduk Split (Croatian I) (Croatia)	1–2	Újpest	San Pedro del Pinatar, Spain
16:00 CET	Brajković 13'	Report	Karamoko 68', 78'	Stadium: Pinatar Arena; Attendance: 150; Referee: Clemente Ortuno (Spain)
Note: ÚJPEST to 60th min.: Piscitelli — Nunes, Duarte, Gergényi, Kaczvinszki — Mező, Lacoux, Kr. Horváth, A. Dénes — Brodić, Saponjić • ÚJPEST from 61st min.: Banai — Baranyai, Eckl, Kobouri, Kaczvinszki — Tajti, Onovo, Kr. Horváth (Mi. Mucsányi (substituted on) 78'), A. Dénes (Sarkadi (substituted on) 85') — Dékei, Karamoko • Manager: Bartosz Grzelak

18 January 2025 Friendly	Śląsk Wrocław (Polish I) (Poland)	0–0	Újpest	Spain
16:00 CET		Report		Referee: José David (Spain)
Note: ÚJPEST: Piscitelli — Nunes, Duarte, Kobouri, Kaczvinszki (Gergényi (substituted on) 71'), Tajti (Mező (substituted on) 71'), Lacoux (Eckl (substituted on) 80'), Kr. Horváth (Mi. Mucsányi (substituted on) 80'), Karamoko (A. Dénes (substituted on) 71'), Brodić, Saponjić (Sarkadi (substituted on) 71') • Manager: Bartosz Grzelak

25 January 2025 Friendly	Újpest	2–0	Tekstilac Odžaci (Serbian I)	Budapest
13:00 CET	A. Dénes; Tučić	Report		Stadium: Szusza Ferenc Stadion; Attendance: 0 (closed doors)

21 March 2025 Friendly	DAC (Slovak I) (Slovakia)	4–2	Újpest	Dunajská Streda, Slovakia
14:00 CET	Trusa 14', 48'; Herc 20'; Sylla 52'	Report	Ljujić 35'; Tajti 62'	Stadium: MOL Football Academy, Pitch 1 Referee: Michal Smolak
Note: ÚJPEST 1st half: Banai — Bese, Nunes, Duarte, Kobouri, Gergényi — Lacoux, Rasak — Ljujić, Tajti, Brodić • ÚJPEST 2nd half: Banai — Bese (Simon (substituted on) 76'), Nunes, Duarte, Kobouri (Máté (substituted on) 84') Ganea — Lacoux (Mi. Mucsányi (substituted on) 76'), Onovo — Karamoko, Tajti (Geiger (substituted on) 62'), Tučić • Manager: Bartosz Grzelak

== Competitions ==
=== Overall record ===
In italics, we indicate the Last match and the Final position achieved in competition(s) that have not yet been completed.

Competition	First match	Last match	Starting round	Final position	Record							
Competition	First match	Last match	Starting round	Final position	Pld	W	D	L	GF	GA	GD	Win %
Nemzeti Bajnokság I	28 July 2024	24 May 2025	Matchday 1	7th	33	9	14	10	38	44	−6	27.27
Magyar Kupa	14 September 2024	2 April 2025	Round of 64	Quarter-final	4	3	0	1	10	3	+7	75.00
Total					37	12	14	11	48	47	+1	32.43

Last updated: 24 May 2025
Source: Soccerway

=== Nemzeti Bajnokság I ===
==== League table ====
Pos	Team	Pld	W	D	L	GF	GA	GD	Pts
5	MTK	33	13	7	13	53	47	+6	46
6	Diósgyőr	33	11	11	11	43	51	−8	44
7	Újpest	33	9	14	10	38	44	−6	41
8	Nyíregyháza	33	9	9	15	31	52	−21	36
9	Debrecen	33	9	7	17	52	59	−7	34

Source: Hungarian Football Federation (in Hungarian)
Rules for classification: 1) Points; 2) Matches won; 3) Goal difference; 4) Goals scored; 5) Head-to-head points; 6) Head-to-head goal difference; 7) Fair play ranking; 8) Drawing of lots.

==== Results summary ====
Overall								Home						Away					
Pld	W	D	L	GF	GA	GD	Pts	W	D	L	GF	GA	GD	W	D	L	GF	GA	GD
33	9	14	10	38	44	−6	41	4	9	4	22	21	+1	5	5	6	16	23	−7

Last updated: 24 May 2025.
Source: Soccerway

==== Results by round ====
A = Away; H = Home; W = Win; D = Draw; L = Loss

Round	1	2	3	4	5	6	7	8	9	10	11	12	13	14	15	16	17	18	19	20	21	22	23	24	25	26	27	28	29	30	31	32	33
Ground	H	A	H	A	H	A	H	H	A	H	A	A	H	A	H	A	H	A	A	H	A	H	H	A	H	A	H	A	H	H	A	H	A
Result	L	L	W	L	W	W	D	D	W	W	L	D	D	W	D	W	D	D	L	L	D	L	D	L	D	L	W	D	D	L	D	D	W
Position	11	10	7	10	6	4	3	6	6	5	5	6	6	6	6	6	6	6	6	6	6	7	7	7	7	7	7	7	7	7	7	7	7
Points	0	0	3	3	6	9	10	11	14	17	17	18	19	22	23	26	27	28	28	28	29	29	30	30	31	31	34	35	36	36	37	38	41
Manager	G	G	G	G	G	G	G	G	G	G	G	G	G	G	G	G	G	G	G	G	G	G	G	G	G	G	G	G	G	G	K	K	K

Updated to match(es) played on 24 May 2025. Source:
Notes:
Manager: • G Grzelak • K Krznar

==== Matches ====
The match schedule was released on 20 June 2024.

Win Draw Loss Postponed

28 July 2024 1	Újpest	1–2	Puskás Akadémia	Budapest
18:50 CEST	Bese (yellow card) 37'; Geiger (yellow card) 46'; Ljujić 58'; Tajti (yellow card) 63'	Report	Colley 56', 60' (yellow card) 89'; Maceiras (yellow card) 71'; Nissila (yellow card) 90+4'	Stadium: Szusza Ferenc Stadion; Attendance: 9,112; Referee: Gergő Bogár; Assistant referees: Balázs Buzás, Georgiou Theodoros
Note: ÚJPEST: Piscitelli — Bese, Nunes, Gergényi — Simon (c) (Má. Mucsányi (substituted on) 67'), Tajti (Keita (substituted on) 88'), Geiger (Dékei (substituted on) 61'), Tamás (Dénes (substituted on) 67') — Csoboth, Ljujić (Radošević (substituted on) 88') — Karamoko • Manager: Bartosz Grzelak

4 August 2024 2	Paks	2–1	Újpest	Paks
18:50 CEST	K. Kovács (yellow card) 24'; Kinyik (yellow card) 31'; Nunes 36' (o.g.); Mezei (yellow card) 44'; Windecker 90+2'	Report	Gergényi (yellow card) 35'; Ljujić (yellow card) 65' (goal) 81'	Stadium: Fehérvári úti Stadion; Attendance: 3,765; Referee: Ferenc Karakó; Assistant referees: I. Albert, B. Belicza
Note: ÚJPEST: Piscitelli — Bese, Nunes, Gergényi — Baranyai (Simon (substituted on) 63'), Tajti (Keita (substituted on) 74'), Radošević (Brodić (substituted on) 46'), Tamás — Dékei (Geiger (substituted on) 46'), Ljujić (c) (Má. Mucsányi (substituted on) 90+1') — Karamoko • Manager: Bartosz Grzelak

11 August 2024 3	Újpest	4–1	Fehérvár	Budapest
18:00 CEST	Ljujić 24'; Brodić 42'; Nunes 47'; Tajti 53'	Report	Csongvai (yellow card) 57'; P. Kovács II 90'	Stadium: Szusza Ferenc Stadion; Attendance: 5,518; Referee: Balázs Berke; Assistant referees: Georgiou Theodoros, Norbert Bornemissza
Note: ÚJPEST: Piscitelli — Bese (Babós (substituted on) 82'), Nunes, Gergényi — Baranyai (Simon (substituted on) 55'), Ljujić (c) (Dénes (substituted on) 70'), Tajti, Geiger (Radošević (substituted on) 55'), Tamás — Karamoko (Má. Mucsányi (substituted on) 82'), Brodić • Manager: Bartosz Grzelak

17 August 2024 4	Ferencváros	1–0	Újpest	Budapest
19:30 CEST	Kehinde 90+2'; Abu Fani (red card) 90+12'	Report	Gergényi (yellow card) 36'; Bese (yellow card) 90+4'; Tamás (yellow card) 90+7'; Nunes (yellow card) 90+12'	Stadium: Ferencváros Stadion; Attendance: 18,751; Referee: Gergő Bogár; Assistant referees: István Albert, Balázs Buzás
Note: It is the 242nd Derby between the two teams. Ferencváros won 119 matches, Újpest won 61 and 62 ended in a draw. • ÚJPEST: Piscitelli — Duarte, Nunes, Gergényi — Bese, Tajti (Radošević (substituted on) 80'), Geiger (Á. Tóth (substituted on) 90+3'), Ljujić (c) (Dénes (substituted on) 90+3'), Tamás – Má. Mucsányi (Keita (substituted on) 61'), Brodić • Manager: Bartosz Grzelak

23 August 2024 5	Újpest	3–0	Debrecen	Budapest
20:00 CEST	Bese 20'; Ljujić 29'; Brodić 52' (pen.); Gergényi (yellow card) 80'	Report	Domingues (yellow card) 54'; Drešković (yellow card) 79'	Stadium: Szusza Ferenc Stadion; Attendance: 5,779; Referee: Mihály Káprály; Assistant referees: Gergely Becséri, Dávid Rózsa
Note: ÚJPEST: Piscitelli — Duarte, Nunes, Gergényi — Bese (Baranyai (substituted on) 84'), Tajti (Lacoux (substituted on) 77'), Geiger, Ljujić (c) (Onovo (substituted on) 84'), Tamás (Kobouri (substituted on) 84') – Má. Mucsányi (Dékei (substituted on) 69') – Brodić • Manager: Bartosz Grzelak

1 September 2024 6	Kecskemét	1–3	Újpest	Kecskemét
15:00 CEST	L. Katona 30'	Report	Gergényi (yellow card) 22'; Má. Mucsányi 34'; Brodić 64'; Ljujić 76'; Nunes (yellow card) 84'	Stadium: Széktói Stadion; Attendance: 4,743; Referee: József Erdős; Assistant referees: Georgiou Theodoros, József Aradi
Note: ÚJPEST: Piscitelli — Bese, Nunes, Duarte, Gergényi, Tamás (Fiola (substituted on) 85') — Tajti (Lacoux (substituted on) 46'), Ljujić (c), Geiger (Onovo (substituted on) 75') — Brodić (Dénes (substituted on) 85'), Má. Mucsányi (Kr. Horváth (substituted on) 59') • Manager: Bartosz Grzelak

21 September 2024 7	Újpest	0–0	Diósgyőr	Budapest
17:00 CEST	Lacoux (yellow card) 23' (yellow-red card) 78'; Duarte (yellow card) 78'; Nunes (yellow card) 90+2'	Report	Edomwonyi (yellow card) 24'; D. Gera (yellow card) 46'; Vallejo (yellow card) 59'; Chorbadzhiyski (yellow card) 75'; Rakonjac (yellow card) 90+8'	Stadium: Szusza Ferenc Stadion; Attendance: 8,562; Referee: Tamás Bognár; Assistant referees: Balázs Szert, Gergő Vígh-Tarsonyi
Note: ÚJPEST: Piscitelli — Bese, Nunes, Duarte, Fiola, Tamás (Má. Mucsányi (substituted on) 74') — Ljujić (c), Lacoux, Geiger (Karamoko (substituted on) 62') — Brodić, Kr. Horváth • Manager: Bartosz Grzelak

27 September 2024 8	Újpest	0–0	Győr	Budapest
20:00 CEST	Fiola (yellow card) 64'; Helmich (yellow card) 72'; Brodić (yellow card) 72'	Report	Heitor (yellow card) 12'; Bitri (yellow card) 19'; Ouro (yellow card) 58'; Gyurákovics (yellow card) 90+7'	Stadium: Szusza Ferenc Stadion; Attendance: 7,120; Referee: Bence Csonka (substituted off) 77' (Mihály Káprály (substituted on) 77'); Assistant referees: Georgiou Theodoros, Péter Ország
Note: ÚJPEST: Piscitelli — Bese, Nunes, Duarte, Fiola, Tamás (Dénes (substituted on) 79') — Dékei (Karamoko (substituted on) 59'), Helmich, Kr. Horváth (Onovo (substituted on) 79') — Brodić, Ljujić (c) • Manager: Bartosz Grzelak

6 October 2024 9	Zalaegerszeg	0–2	Újpest	Zalaegerszeg
15:30 CEST	Bakti (yellow card) 52'; Sanković (yellow card) 57'; Dénes (yellow card) 75'	Report	Brodić 7' (yellow card) 80'; Ljujić 17' (pen.); Kr. Horváth (yellow card) 57'; Tamás (yellow card) 71'; Duarte (yellow card) 75'	Stadium: ZTE Arena; Attendance: 4,974; Referee: Tamás Bognár; Assistant referees: Péter Kóbor, István Szécsényi
Note: ÚJPEST: Piscitelli — Bese, Nunes, Duarte, Fiola, Tamás (Gergényi (substituted on) 75') — Ljujić (c) (Geiger (substituted on) 88'), Lacoux, Helmich (Onovo (substituted on) 60') — Brodić, Kr. Horváth (Má. Mucsányi (substituted on) 60') • Manager: Bartosz Grzelak; Player of the match: Matija Ljujić, Újpest 8.0 (Source:)

19 October 2024 10	Újpest	1–0	Nyíregyháza	Budapest
19:30 CEST	Duarte (yellow card) 9' (goal) 90'; Ljujić (yellow card) 90+3'	Report	Toma (yellow card) 45'; Keita (yellow card) 71'; Gengeliczki (yellow card) 83'; D. Nagy (yellow card) 86'	Stadium: Szusza Ferenc Stadion; Attendance: 6,039; Referee: Márton Rúsz; Assistant referees: István Albert, Ákos Berényi
Note: ÚJPEST: Piscitelli — Nunes, Duarte, Fiola — Bese, Lacoux (Onovo (substituted on) 61'), Geiger (Kr. Horváth (substituted on) 46'), Gergényi (Tamás (substituted on) 61') — Brodić, Ljujić (c), Dénes (Má. Mucsányi (substituted on) 61') • Manager: Bartosz Grzelak; Player of the match: André Duarte, Újpest 8.1 (Source:)

26 October 2024 11	MTK Budapest	4–1	Újpest	Budapest
20:45 CEST	Jurina 16'; Beriashvili (yellow card) 48'; Duarte 56' (o.g.); Kosznovszky 66'; Molnár 71'	Report	Má. Mucsányi 2'; Kr. Horváth (yellow card) 73'; Brodić (yellow card) 74'	Stadium: Hidegkuti Nándor Stadion; Attendance: 4,035; Referee: Péter Antal; Assistant referees: Gergő Vígh-Tarsonyi, Balázs Szert
Note: ÚJPEST: Piscitelli — Nunes, Duarte, Fiola — Bese (Simon (substituted on) 36'), Má. Mucsányi, Lacoux (Onovo (substituted on) 72'), Tamás (Dénes (substituted on) 72') — Ljujić (c) — Brodić (Dékei (substituted on) 77'), Kr. Horváth (Geiger (substituted on) 77') • Manager: Bartosz Grzelak; Player of the match: Ádin Molnár, MTK 8.6 • Best player of Újpest: Fran Brodić and Matija Ljujić 7.2 each (Source:)

2 November 2024 12	Puskás Akadémia	1–1	Újpest	Felcsút
16:30 CET	Colley 6' (yellow card) 66'; Golla (yellow card) 13'; Maceiras (yellow card) 16'; Szolnoki (yellow card) 90+5'	Report	Má. Mucsányi 41'; Fiola (yellow card) 54'	Stadium: Pancho Aréna; Attendance: 2,320; Referee: Tamás Bognár; Assistant referees: Georgiou Theodoros, Balázs Huszár
Note: ÚJPEST: Piscitelli — Nunes, Duarte, Fiola — Má. Mucsányi (Karamoko (substituted on) 63'), Geiger (Tajti (substituted on) 75'), Onovo (Lacoux (substituted on) 81'), Gergényi (Kobouri (substituted on) 81') — Ljujić (c), Kr. Horváth – Brodić • Manager: Bartosz Grzelak; Player of the match: Lamin Colley, Puskás Akadémia 7.7 • Best player of Újpest: Bálint Geiger 7.5 (Source:)

9 November 2024 13	Újpest	0–0	Paks	Budapest
18:30 CET	Má. Mucsányi (yellow card) 15'	Report		Stadium: Szusza Ferenc Stadion; Attendance: 5,241; Referee: Csaba Pintér; Assistant referees: Balázs Buzás, Péter Kóbor
Note: ÚJPEST: Piscitelli — Fiola, Nunes, Duarte, Kobouri (Gergényi (substituted on) 65') — Onovo (Lacoux (substituted on) 83'), Geiger (Tajti (substituted on) 61') — Má. Mucsányi (Karamoko (substituted on) 61'), Ljujić (c) (Dékei (substituted on) 83'), Kr. Horváth – Brodić • Manager: Bartosz Grzelak; Player of the match: Ádám Kovácsik, Paks 9.0 • Best player of Újpest: João Nunes 8.2 (Source:)

23 November 2024 14	Fehérvár	0–1	Újpest	Székesfehérvár
18:30 CET	A. Huszti (yellow card) 41'; Csongvai (yellow card) 90'	Report	Nunes (yellow card) 48'; Tajti 64'; Dénes (yellow card) 69'; Ljujić (yellow card) 83'; Geiger (yellow card) 90+2'	Stadium: Sóstói Stadion; Attendance: 3,505; Referee: Gergő Bogár; Assistant referees: Balázs Szert, Dániel Szalai
Note: ÚJPEST: Piscitelli — Fiola, Duarte, Nunes, Kobouri — Tajti (Lacoux (substituted on) 70'), Onovo (Gergényi (substituted on) 85') — Má. Mucsányi (Kr. Horváth (substituted on) 59'), Ljujić (c) (Geiger (substituted on) 85'), Dénes (Karamoko (substituted on) 70') — Brodić • Manager: Bartosz Grzelak; Player of the match: Fran Brodić, Riccardo Piscitelli Újpest 8.0 each (Source:)

1 December 2024 15	Újpest	0–0	Ferencváros	Budapest
19:30 CET	Banai (On the bench) (yellow card) 14'; Fiola (yellow card) 14'; Onovo (yellow card) 22'; Ljujić (yellow card) 38'	Report	Maïga (yellow card) 32'; Makreckis (yellow card) 37'; Ben Romdhane (yellow card) 63'; Pešić (yellow card) 84'	Stadium: Szusza Ferenc Stadion; Attendance: 10.273; Referee: Balázs Berke; Assistant referees: Vencel Tóth II, Gergő Vígh-Tarsonyi
Note: ÚJPEST: Piscitelli — Fiola, Duarte, Nunes, Kobouri (Gergényi (substituted on) 90+2') – Onovo (Lacoux (substituted on) 46'), Tajti (Geiger (substituted on) 69') – Ljujić (c) (Má. Mucsányi (substituted on) 73'), Dénes (Dékei (substituted on) 90+2'), Kr. Horváth – Brodić • Manager: Bartosz Grzelak; Player of the match: André Duarte, Újpest 8.1 (Source:)

8 December 2024 16	Debrecen	1–2	Újpest	Debrecen
17:00 CET	Dzsudzsák (yellow card) 13'; Lagator (yellow card) 18'; Szécsi 53'; Domingues (red card) 57'; D. Kocsis (yellow card) 90+2'	Report	Brodić 13' (yellow card) 69'; Nunes (yellow card) 32'; Onovo (yellow card) 37'; Gergényi (yellow card) 60'; Lacoux 67'	Stadium: Nagyerdei Stadion; Attendance: 4,332; Referee: Gergő Bogár; Assistant referees: Vencel Tóth II, József Aradi
Note: ÚJPEST: Piscitelli (Banai (substituted on) 73') — Fiola (c), Nunes, Duarte, Kobouri (Gergényi (substituted on) 58') — Tajti, Onovo (Lacoux (substituted on) 58') — Dénes (Dékei (substituted on) 64'), Má. Mucsányi, Kr. Horváth — Brodić • Manager: Bartosz Grzelak; Player of the match: Tom Lacoux, Újpest 8.0 (Source:)

15 December 2024 17	Újpest	1–1	Kecskemét	Budapest
13:00 CET	Baranyai (yellow card) 15'; Dénes 48'; Má. Mucsányi (yellow card) 72'; Fiola (yellow card) 84'	Report	Zsótér 45+1'; B. Kovács (yellow card) 51'	Stadium: Szusza Ferenc Stadion; Attendance: 150 (Partly closed doors); Referee: Ferenc Karakó; Assistant referees: Georgiou Theodoros, Balázs Szert
Note: ÚJPEST: Piscitelli — Fiola (c), Baranyai, Duarte, Kobouri — Lacoux, Tajti — Má. Mucsányi (Dékei (substituted on) 78'), Brodić, Kr. Horváth – Dénes • Manager: Bartosz Grzelak; Player of the match: Davit Kobouri and André Duarte, Újpest 8.0 each (Source:)

1 February 2025 18	Diósgyőr	1–1	Újpest	Miskolc
19:30 CET	Szatmári 56'; D. Gera (yellow card) 72'	Report	Karamoko 21'; Duarte (yellow card) 55'; Kaczvinszki (red card) 66'; Piscitelli (yellow card) 90+3'	Stadium: Diósgyőri Stadion; Attendance: 6,642; Referee: Mihály Káprály; Assistant referees: Balázs Szert, József Aradi
Note: ÚJPEST: Piscitelli — Nunes (c), Duarte, Kaczvinszki, Gergényi — Kr. Horváth (Kobouri (substituted on) 68'), Rasak (Onovo (substituted on) 87'), Lacoux, Karamoko (Dénes (substituted on) 75') — Tučić, Brodić (Tajti (substituted on) 88') • Manager: Bartosz Grzelak; Player of the match: Mamoudou Karamoko, Újpest 7.7 (Source:)

8 February 2025 19	Győr	3–0	Újpest	Győr
19:30 CET	Gavrić 8'; Benbouali 41'; Vitális (yellow card) 68'; Bumba 76'	Report		Stadium: ETO Park; Attendance: 4,380; Referee: Péter Antal; Assistant referees: Norbert Bornemissza, Péter Ország
Note: ÚJPEST: Piscitelli — Nunes (c), Duarte, Kobouri, Gergényi — Karamoko (Sarkadi (substituted on) 87'), Lacoux, Brodić (Dékei (substituted on) 82'), Rasak (Ljujić (substituted on) 75'), Kr. Horváth (Dénes (substituted on) 46') — Tučić • Manager: Bartosz Grzelak; Player of the match: Claudiu Bumba, Győr 8.6 • Best player of Újpest: Adrián Dénes 7.2 (Source:)

16 February 2025 20	Újpest	1–2	Zalaegerszeg	Budapest
15:30 CET	Karamoko 17'; Fiola (yellow card) 68'; Lacoux (yellow card) (yellow-red card) 75'; Kaczvinszki (yellow card) 82'	Report	Sanković (yellow card) 32'; Croizet (yellow card) 36'; Dénes 83'; Medgyes 90+4'; Almási (red card) 90+5'	Stadium: Szusza Ferenc Stadion; Attendance: 4,082; Referee: Gergő Bogár; Assistant referees: Dániel Szalai, Péter Ország
Note: ÚJPEST: Piscitelli — Kobouri (Fiola (substituted on) 63'), Nunes (c), Duarte, Kaczvinszki — Rasak, Lacoux — Dénes (Beridze (substituted on) 71'), Tučić, Brodić (Tajti (substituted on) 77'), Karamoko (Kr. Horváth (substituted on) 77') • Manager: Bartosz Grzelak; Player of the match: Stefanos Evangelou, Zalaegerszeg 8.0 • Best player of Újpest: Fran Brodić 7.9 (Source:)

22 February 2025 21	Nyíregyháza	0–0	Újpest	Nyíregyháza
19:30 CET	D. Nagy (red card) 24'; Korrea (yellow card) 47'	Report	Ljujić (yellow card) 27'; Rasak (yellow card) 74'; Duarte (yellow card) 90+2'	Stadium: Városi Stadion; Attendance: 4,892; Referee: Balázs Berke; Assistant referees: Zoltán Horváth, Dávid Rózsa
Note: ÚJPEST: Piscitelli — Nunes (Geiger (substituted on) 78'), Duarte, Kaczvinszki, Kobouri (Gergényi (substituted on) 65') — Rasak, Ljujić (c) (Tajti (substituted on) 85') — Kr. Horváth (Beridze (substituted on) 65'), Brodić, Karamoko — Tučić (Má. Mucsányi (substituted on) 78') • Manager: Bartosz Grzelak; Player of the match: Dominik Kaczvinszki, Újpest 7.6 (Source:)

1 March 2025 22	Újpest	1–5	MTK Budapest	Budapest
19:30 CET	Brodić 56'; Dénes (yellow card) 69'; Dékei (yellow card) 78'	Report	Hey (yellow card) 11'; R. Molnár 38' (pen.); Kosznovszky (yellow card) 52'; Jurina 60'; Gruber 64'; Varju 72'; Kaczvinszki 77' (o.g.); P. Kovács I (yellow card) 87'	Stadium: Szusza Ferenc Stadion; Attendance: 3,702; Referee: Csaba Pintér; Assistant referees: Balázs Szalai, Balázs Szert
Note: ÚJPEST: Piscitelli — Babós (Bese (substituted on) 67'), Fiola (c), Kaczvinszki, Gergényi — Lacoux (Dékei (substituted on) 67'), Rasak (Geiger (substituted on) 75') — Má. Mucsányi (Dénes (substituted on) 46'), Kr. Horváth, Beridze (Sarkadi (substituted on) 75') — Brodić • Manager: Bartosz Grzelak; Player of the match: Rajmund Molnár, MTK 8.6 • Best player of Újpest: Fran Brodić 7.5 (Source:)

9 March 2025 23	Újpest	1–1	Puskás Akadémia	Budapest
18:00 CET	Ganea (yellow card) 45'; Kr. Horváth (yellow card) 48'; Fiola (yellow card) 51'; Brodić 60'; Duarte (yellow card) 70'	Report	Colley 54'; Plšek (yellow card) 64'; Soisalo (yellow card) 90+4'	Stadium: Szusza Ferenc Stadion; Attendance: 3,807; Referee: Mihály Káprály; Assistant referees: István Albert, Péter Garai
Note: ÚJPEST: Piscitelli — Nunes, Duarte, Fiola, Gergényi — Bese, Rasak — Ljujić (c) (Tučić (substituted on) 55'), Ganea (Lacoux (substituted on) 79'), Kr. Horváth — Brodić • Manager: Bartosz Grzelak; Player of the match: Jonathan Levi, Puskás Akadémia 8.1 • Best player of Újpest: Fran Brodić, João Nunes, André Duarte 7.5 each (Source:)

14 March 2025 24	Paks	6–1	Újpest	Paks
20:30 CET	B. Tóth 25', 48', 52', 68'; Mezei 57'; Hinora 90'	Report	Brodić 9'; Fiola (yellow card) 67'; Kobouri (yellow card) 88'	Stadium: Fehérvári úti Stadion; Attendance: 3,611; Referee: Balázs Berke; Assistant referees: József Aradi, Bence Belicza
Note: ÚJPEST: Piscitelli — Fiola, Bese, Duarte, Nunes, Gergényi (Beridze (substituted on) 56') — Ljujić (c) (Tučić (substituted on) 74'), Rasak (Tajti (substituted on) 56'), Kr. Horváth (Karamoko (substituted on) 56') — Brodić, Ganea (Kobouri (substituted on) 31') • Manager: Bartosz Grzelak; Player of the match: Barna Tóth, Paks 10.0 • Best player of Újpest: Fran Brodić 7.8 (Source:)

30 March 2025 25	Újpest	2–2	Fehérvár	Budapest
14:30 CEST	Bese 22'; Melnyk 40' (o.g.); Lacoux (yellow card) 90'; Fiola (yellow card) 90+2'	Report	Serafimov (yellow card) 4'; Šaponjić 58' (yellow card) 66'; Kalandadze (yellow card) 88'; B. Szabó 90+2' (yellow card) 90+10'; Melnyk (yellow card) 90+2'	Stadium: Szusza Ferenc Stadion; Attendance: 5,074; Referee: Tamás Bognár; Assistant referees: Vencel Tóth II, Balázs Szalai
Note: ÚJPEST: Piscitelli — Bese, Nunes, Duarte, Gergényi — Lacoux, Fiola — Ljujić (c) (Rasak (substituted on) 55'), Kr. Horváth (Geiger (substituted on) 73'), Brodić (Ganea (substituted on) 80') — Karamoko (Beridze (substituted on) 73') • Manager: Bartosz Grzelak; Player of the match: Bálint Szabó, Fehérvár 7.9 • Best player of Újpest: Tom Lacoux 7.6 (Source:)

6 April 2025 26	Ferencváros	2–0	Újpest	Budapest
19:00 CEST	Maïga 18'; Pešić 45'; Abu Fani (yellow card) 77'	Report	Lacoux (yellow card) 37'; Fiola (yellow card) 61'; Karamoko (yellow card) 73'; Bese (yellow card) 75'	Stadium: Ferencváros Stadion; Attendance: 18,774; Referee: Bence Csonka; Assistant referees: István Albert, Balázs Buzás
Note: ÚJPEST: Piscitelli — Nunes, Duarte, Fiola (c) — Bese (Má. Mucsányi (substituted on) 86'), Geiger (Rasak (substituted on) 86'), Lacoux, Gergényi — Beridze, Brodić, Karamoko • Manager: Bartosz Grzelak; Player of the match: Alex Tóth, Ferencváros 8.3 • Best player of Újpest: João Nunes 7.2 (Source:)

13 April 2025 27	Újpest	2–1	Debrecen	Budapest
14:00 CEST	Brodić (yellow card) 20'; Beridze 48'; Rasak 57'; Gergényi (yellow card) 90+1'	Report	Youga (yellow card) 11'; Bárány 64'	Stadium: Szusza Ferenc Stadion; Attendance: 5,502; Referee: Márton Rúsz; Assistant referees: Péter Garai, Dávid Rózsa
Note: ÚJPEST: Piscitelli — Nunes, Duarte, Fiola (c) — Bese, Lacoux, Rasak, Gergényi — Beridze (Ljujić (substituted on) 67'), Brodić (Kaczvinszki (substituted on) 87'), Karamoko (Kr. Horváth (substituted on) 75') • Manager: Bartosz Grzelak; Player of the match: Damian Rasak, Újpest 8.3 (Source:)

21 April 2025 28	Kecskemét	0–0	Újpest	Kecskemét
18:30 CEST	Camaj (yellow card) 64'; Botka (yellow card) 66'; Vágó (yellow card) 89'	Report		Stadium: Széktói Stadion; Attendance: 2,864; Referee: Mihály Káprály; Assistant referees: Gergely Becséri, Péter Ország
Note: ÚJPEST: Piscitelli — Nunes, Duarte, Fiola — Bese, Rasak, Lacoux, Gergényi — Ljujić (c) (Geiger (substituted on) 82'), Karamoko (Dénes (substituted on) 59'), Beridze (Kr. Horváth (substituted on) 82') • Manager: Bartosz Grzelak; Player of the match: Riccardo Piscitelli, Újpest 8.5 (Source:)

26 April 2025 29	Újpest	1–1	Diósgyőr	Budapest
20:00 CEST	Lacoux 48'; Fiola (yellow card) 85'; Brodić (yellow card) 90+4'	Report	Holdampf (yellow card) 44'; Kállai (yellow card) 53'; Szakos 69'	Stadium: Szusza Ferenc Stadion; Attendance: 5,187; Referee: Marcell Derdák; Assistant referees: Balázs Buzás, Bence Belicza
Note: ÚJPEST: Piscitelli — Nunes, Duarte, Fiola (c) — Bese, Rasak, Lacoux, Gergényi — Beridze (Kr. Horváth (substituted on) 82') — Karamoko (Ljujić (substituted on) 82'), Brodić • Manager: Bartosz Grzelak; Player of the match: Tom Lacoux, Újpest 8.4 (Source:)

3 May 2025 30	Újpest	2–3	Győr	Budapest
13:00 CEST	Ljujić 77' (pen.), 90+3'	Report	Vitális (yellow card) 50'; Ouro 52'; Bumba 71'; Szépe 84'	Stadium: Szusza Ferenc Stadion; Attendance: 4,952; Referee: Péter Antal; Assistant referees: Norbert Bornemissza, Dávid Rózsa
Note: ÚJPEST: Piscitelli (Banai (substituted on) 10') — Bese, Nunes (Má. Mucsányi (substituted on) 72'), Duarte, Gergényi — Rasak (Geiger (substituted on) 72'), Lacoux — Beridze (Karamoko (substituted on) 72'), Ljujić (c), Kr. Horváth (Simon (substituted on) 87') — Brodić • Manager: Bartosz Grzelak; Player of the match: Matija Ljujić, Újpest 8.6 (Source:)

11 May 2025 31	Zalaegerszeg	0–0	Újpest	Zalaegerszeg
13:00 CEST	B. Kiss (yellow card) 33'; Sanković (yellow card) 58'; Esiti (yellow card) 90+1'	Report	Gergényi (yellow card) 49'; Ljujić (yellow card) 58' (yellow-red card) 81'; Lacoux (yellow card) 67'; Fiola (yellow card) 78'	Stadium: ZTE Arena; Attendance: 3,780; Referee: Tamás Bognár; Assistant referees: István Szécsényi, Dániel Szalai
Note: ÚJPEST: Banai — Fiola (c), Nunes, Duarte, Gergényi (Kaczvinszki (substituted on) 82') — Lacoux (Geiger (substituted on) 70'), Ljujić, Rasak (Bese (substituted on) 46') — Beridze (Má. Mucsányi (substituted on) 65'), Kr. Horváth (Tučić (substituted on) 46') — Brodić • Manager: Damir Krznar; Player of the match: João Nunes and Barnabás Bese, Újpest 7.5 each (Source:)

16 May 2025 32	Újpest	2–2	Nyíregyháza	Budapest
20:30 CEST	Kr. Horváth 25'; Brodić 68'; Fiola (yellow card) 90+2'	Report	Eppel 29' (yellow card) 43'; M. Kovács 60' (yellow card) 64'; Jokić (yellow card) 72'	Stadium: Szusza Ferenc Stadion; Attendance: 5,196; Referee: József Erdős; Assistant referees: István Szécsényi, Dávid Rózsa
Note: ÚJPEST: Banai — Bese, Nunes (c), Duarte, Kaczvinszki (Gergényi (substituted on) 46') — Tajti (Lacoux (substituted on) 69'), Fiola, Rasak (Simon (substituted on) 75') — Kr. Horváth, Brodić, Beridze • Manager: Damir Krznar; Player of the match: Krisztofer Horváth, Újpest 8.0 (Source:)

24 May 2025 33	MTK Budapest	1–3	Újpest	Budapest
15:00 CEST	Kata (yellow card) 21'; A. Horváth 27'; Zs. Nagy (yellow card) 55'; Jurina (yellow card) 79'; Gruber (yellow card) 87'; Kádár (yellow card) 88'	Report	Ljujić 1'; Gergényi (yellow card) 35'; Kr. Horváth 45+1'; Beridze 56'; Brodić (yellow card) 72'; Fiola (yellow card) 79'	Stadium: Hidegkuti Nándor Stadion; Attendance: 2,855; Referee: Katalin Kulcsár; Assistant referees: Zoltán Horváth, Anita Vad
Note: ÚJPEST: Piscitelli — Bese, Nunes, Kobouri, Gergényi (Duarte (substituted on) 80') — Ljujić (c) (Fiola (substituted on) 70'), Tajti (Rasak (substituted on) 60') — Lacoux, Kr. Horváth, Beridze (Simon (substituted on) 80') — Brodić (Ganea (substituted on) 80') • Manager: Damir Krznar; Player of the match: Krisztofer Horváth, Újpest 8.4 (Source:)

==== Results overview ====
All results are indicated from the perspective of Újpest FC.
We indicate in parentheses the number of round.
Win Draw Loss Postponed

Opposition	Round 1–22		Round 23–33		Total score	Points
Opposition	Home score	Away score	Home score	Away score	Total score	Points
Debrecen	3–0 (5)	2–1 (16)	2–1 (27)		7–2	9
Diósgyőr	0–0 (7)	1–1 (18)	1–1 (29)		2–2	3
Fehérvár	4–1 (3)	1–0 (14)	2–2 (25)		7–3	7
Ferencváros	0–0 (15)	0–1 (4)		0–2 (26)	0–3	1
Győr	0–0 (8)	0–3 (19)	2–3 (30)		2–6	1
Kecskemét	1–1 (17)	3–1 (6)		0–0 (28)	4–2	5
MTK	1–5 (22)	1–4 (11)		3–1 (33)	5–10	3
Nyíregyháza	1–0 (10)	0–0 (21)	2–2 (32)		3–2	5
Paks	0–0 (13)	1–2 (2)		1–6 (24)	2–8	1
Puskás Akadémia	1–2 (1)	1–1 (12)	1–1 (23)		3–4	2
Zalaegerszeg	1–2 (20)	2–0 (9)		0–0 (31)	3–2	4

=== Magyar Kupa ===
==== Round of 64 ====
The draw for the Round of 64 was held on 26 August 2024. In the draw Újpest got Dunavarsány as their opponent, who play in MB 1. In the First round Dunavarsány defeated Gyula 2–1 at home. In the Second round Dunavarsány matched Csepel at home and defeated 4–2.

14 September 2024 R64	Fémalk-Dunavarsány (MB 1)	0–7	Újpest	Dunavarsány
15:00 CEST	Vastag (yellow card) 54'; Gubacsi (yellow card) 79'	Report	Kr. Horváth 10', 60'; Ljujić 17'; Nunes 28'; Fiola 34'; Geiger 40'; Baranyai 87'	Stadium: Dunavarsányi TE Sporttelep; Attendance: 750; Referee: Márton Rúsz; Assistant referees: Zoltán Horváth, Dávid Rózsa
Note: ÚJPEST: Banai (c) — Nunes, Duarte, Gergényi (K. Tamás (substituted on) 40') — Bese (Baranyai (substituted on) 62'), Lacoux, Geiger (Karamoko (substituted on) 62'), Fiola (Kaczvinszki (substituted on) 72') — Kr. Horváth, Ljujić (Helmich (substituted on) 46') — Brodić • Coach: Bartosz Grzelak

==== Round of 32 ====
The draw for the Round of 64 was held on 16 September 2024. In the draw Újpest got BVSC-Zugló as their opponent, who play in NB II. BVSC-Zugló also started the Magyar Kupa competitions in Round of 64, they matched Debreceni EAC (NB III) away and the result was 2–0 after extra time.

30 October 2024 R32	BVSC-Zugló (NB II)	0–1	Újpest	Budapest
12:30 CET	Vinícius (yellow card) 71'	Report	Lacoux (yellow card) 13'; Má. Mucsányi 89'	Stadium: Szőnyi úti Stadion; Attendance: 700; Referee: Ádám Pillók; Assistant referees: Balázs Buzás, Milán Mohos
Note: ÚJPEST: Banai — Nunes, Duarte, Fiola — Má. Mucsányi (Kobouri (substituted on) 90+3'), Geiger, Lacoux (Onovo (substituted on) 46'), Gergényi (Tajti (substituted on) 57') — Ljujić (c), Kr. Horváth (Karamoko (substituted on) 90+3'), Dénes (Brodić (substituted on) 57') • Coach: Bartosz Grzelak

==== Round of 16 ====
The draw for the Round of 32 was held on 31 October 2024. In the draw Újpest got Dorogi FC as their opponent, who play in NB III. In the First round Dorog matched Lábatlan (MB I) and defeated 5–0 away. In the Second round Dorog matched Vép (MB I) and defeated 3–1 away. In the Round of 64 Dorog matched Érd (NB III) and defeated 1–0 home. In the Round of 32 Dorog matched Gödöllő (MB I) and defeated 2–1 away.

26 February 2025 R16	Dorog (NB II)	0–1	Újpest	Dorog
20:00 CET	Erdei (yellow card) 60'; Kálovits (yellow card) 86'; Ferkó (yellow card) 86'; Balla (yellow card) 88'	Report	Beridze 20' (yellow card) 53'; Banai (yellow card) 86'; Brodić (yellow card) 86'; Karamoko (yellow card) 90+4'	Stadium: Buzánszky Jenő Labdarúgó Stadion; Attendance: 2,000; Referee: Márton Rúsz; Assistant referees: Gergő Vígh-Tarsonyi, Gergely Becséri
Note: ÚJPEST: Banai (c) — Fiola (Geiger (substituted on) 74'), Kaczvinszki, Duarte, Gergényi — Dénes (Kr. Horváth (substituted on) 61'), Rasak, Lacoux, Beridze (Má. Mucsányi (substituted on) 61') — Brodić, Tučić (Karamoko (substituted on) 61') • Manager: Bartosz Grzelak

==== Quarter-final ====
The draw for the quarter-finals was held on 27 February 2025. In the draw Újpest got Ferencvárosi TC as their opponent, who play in Nemzeti Bajnokság I. In the Round of 64 Ferencváros matched Budafok (NB II) and defeated 3–0 away. In the Round of 32 Ferencváros matched Tiszafüred (NB III) and defeated 2–1 away. In the Round of 16 Ferencváros matched Győr (NB I) and defeated 4–3 after extra time, away.

2 April 2025 QF	Ferencváros (NB I)	3–1	Újpest	Budapest
19:45 CEST	Pesić 32'; Makreckis 40'; Saldanha 52' (yellow card) 65'; Gartenmann (yellow card) 82'	Report	Brodić (yellow card) 48' (goal) 84'; Geiger (yellow card) 58'; Ljujić (yellow card) 88'	Stadium: Ferencváros Stadion; Attendance: 16,129; Referee: Mihály Káprály; Assistant referees: Péter Kóbor, Gergely Becséri
Note: Banai (c) — Fiola (Beridze (substituted on) 63'), Nunes, Duarte (Kaczvinszki (substituted on) 55'), Kobouri — Rasak (Kr. Horváth (substituted on) 63'), Lacoux (Onovo (substituted on) 78') — Bese, Geiger, Karamoko (Dénes (substituted on) 78') — Brodić • Manager: Bartosz Grzelak

== Squad statistics ==
As of match played 14 March 2025

Keys
Rk.	Rank	No.	Squad number	Pos.	Position
Opponent	The opponent team without a flag is Hungarian.			(N)	The game was played at a neutral site.
(H)	Újpest FC were the home team.			(A)	Újpest FC were the away team.
Player	Young Hungarian Player, who is a Hungarian player and was born 2004 or after				
Player^{*}	Player who joined Újpest FC on loan during the season				
Player^{⊕}	Player who joined Újpest FC permanently during the season				
Player^{†}	Player who departed Újpest FC permanently or on loan during the season				

=== Appearances ===
Includes all competitions for senior teams.
We indicate the number of the player's appearances as substitute by the combination of a plus sign and a figure.
We indicate with gold color the maximum appearances only in the competition in which the team has already played at least 2 matches.

No.	Pos.	Nat.	Player	Nemzeti Bajnokság I	Magyar Kupa	Season total	Ref.
Goalkeepers
1	GK	(Hungary)	Gellért Genzler	0	0	0	
23	GK	(Hungary)	Dávid Banai	0+1	3	3+1	
93	GK	(Italy)	Riccardo Piscitelli	24	0	24	
Defenders
3	DF	(Hungary)	Csanád Fehér	0	0	0	
4	DF	(Hungary)	Levente Babós	1+1	0	1+1	
5	DF	(Georgia (country))	Daviti Kobouri	8+4	0+1	8+5	
8	DF	(Hungary)	Márk Dékei	2+9	0	2+9	
22	DF	(Hungary)	Krisztián Tamás	10+1	0+1	10+2	
25	DF	(Hungary)	Nimród Baranyai	3+1	0+1	3+2	
26	DF	(Hungary)	Bálint Geiger	9+7	2+1	11+8	
30	DF	(Portugal)	João Nunes	22	2	24	
33	DF	(Hungary)	Barnabás Bese	13+1	1	14+1	
35	DF	(Portugal)	André Duarte	20	3	23	
44	DF	(Hungary)	Bence Gergényi	13+5	3	16+5	
55	DF	(Hungary)	Attila Fiola	14+2	3	17+2	
74	DF	(Hungary)	Dominik Kaczvinszki	4	1+1	5+1	
Midfielders
6	MF	(Poland)	Damian Rasak^{⊕}	7	1	8	
7	MF	(Hungary)	Krisztián Simon	1+3	0	1+3	
10	MF	(Hungary)	Mátyás Tajti	10+6	0+1	10+7	
15	MF	(Hungary)	Miron Mucsányi	0	0	0	
18	MF	(France)	Tom Lacoux	8+8	3	11+8	
21	MF	(Hungary)	Pál Helmich	1	0+1	1+1	
29	MF	(Nigeria)	Vincent Onovo	5+7	0+1	5+8	
77	MF	(Hungary)	Adrián Dénes	6+9	2	8+9	
88	MF	(Serbia)	Matija Ljujić (c)	18+1	2	20+1	
Forwards
9	FW	(Croatia)	Fran Brodić	22+1	2+1	24+2	
11	FW	(Hungary)	Krisztofer Horváth	15+4	2+1	17+5	
14	FW	(Georgia (country))	Giorgi Beridze^{⊕}	1+3	1	2+3	
17	FW	(Romania)	George Ganea	2	0	2	
34	FW	(Slovenia)	Milan Tučić^{⊕}	4+2	1	5+2	
38	FW	(Hungary)	Kristóf Sarkadi	0+2	0	0+2	
47	FW	(Hungary)	Márk Mucsányi	10+7	1+1	11+8	
57	FW	(Hungary)	Ákos Tóth	0+1	0	0+1	
70	FW	(France)	Mamoudou Karamoko^{*}	7+6	0+3	7+9	
Players who departed the club on loan but featured this season
Players who left the club during the season
(19)	MF	(Ivory Coast)	Aboubakar Keita^{†}	0+3	0	0+3	
(28)	MF	(Serbia)	Ognjen Radošević^{†}	1+3	0	1+3	
(77)	FW	(Hungary)	Kevin Csoboth^{†}	1	0	1	

Notes: GK: goalkeeper; DF: defender; MF: midfielder; FW: forward

=== Goal scorers ===
Includes all competitions for senior teams. The list is sorted by squad number when season-total goals are equal. Players with no goals not included in the list.
We indicate in parentheses how many of the goals scored by the player from penalties.

Rk.	No.	Pos.	Nat.	Player	Nemzeti Bajnokság I	Magyar Kupa	Season total
1	9	FW	(Croatia)	Fran Brodić	8 (1)	0	8 (1)
2	88	MF	(Serbia)	Matija Ljujić (c)	6 (1)	1	7 (1)
3	47	DF	(Hungary)	Márk Mucsányi	3	1	4
4	10	MF	(Hungary)	Mátyás Tajti	2	0	2
4	11	FW	(Hungary)	Krisztofer Horváth	0	2	2
4	30	DF	(Portugal)	João Nunes	1	1	2
4	70	FW	(France)	Mamoudou Karamoko	2	0	2
5	14	FW	(Georgia (country))	Giorgi Beridze^{⊕}	0	1	1
5	18	MF	(France)	Tom Lacoux	1	0	1
5	25	DF	(Hungary)	Nimród Baranyai	0	1	1
5	26	DF	(Hungary)	Bálint Geiger	0	1	1
5	33	DF	(Hungary)	Barnabás Bese	1	0	1
5	35	DF	(Portugal)	André Duarte	1	0	1
5	55	DF	(Hungary)	Attila Fiola	0	1	1
5	77	MF	(Hungary)	Adrián Dénes	1	0	1
				Opponent Own goal	0	0	0
Total					26 (2)	9	35 (2)

=== Penalties ===
Date	Penalty Taker	Scored	Opponent	Competition
23 August 2024	(Croatia) Fran Brodić	Yes	Debrecen (H)	Nemzeti Bajnokság I, Round 5
6 October 2024	(Serbia) Matija Ljujić	Yes	Zalaegerszeg (A)	Nemzeti Bajnokság I, Round 9
2 November 2024	(Croatia) Fran Brodić	No	Puskás Akadémia (A)	Nemzeti Bajnokság I, Round 12

=== Assists ===
Includes all competitions for senior teams. The list is sorted by squad number when season-total assists are equal. Players with no assists not included in the list.

Rk.	No.	Pos.	Nat.	Player	Nemzeti Bajnokság I	Magyar Kupa	Season total
1	9	FW	(Croatia)	Fran Brodić	5	1	6
2	26	DF	(Hungary)	Bálint Geiger	4	0	4
3	11	FW	(Hungary)	Krisztofer Horváth	3	0	3
3	33	DF	(Hungary)	Barnabás Bese	2	1	3
4	47	DF	(Hungary)	Márk Mucsányi	2	0	2
5	5	DF	(Georgia (country))	Davit Kobouri	1	0	1
5	18	MF	(France)	Tom Lacoux	1	0	1
5	22	DF	(Hungary)	Krisztián Tamás	0	1	1
5	30	DF	(Portugal)	João Nunes	1	0	1
5	44	DF	(Hungary)	Bence Gergényi	1	0	1
5	77	MF	(Hungary)	Adrián Dénes	0	1	1
5	88	MF	(Serbia)	Matija Ljujić	1	0	1
5	70	FW	(France)	Mamoudou Karamoko^{*}	1	0	1
Total					22	4	26

=== Goalkeepers ===
==== Clean sheets ====
Includes all competitions for senior teams. The list is sorted by squad number when season-total clean sheets are equal. Numbers in parentheses represent games where both goalkeepers participated and both kept a clean sheet; the number in parentheses is awarded to the goalkeeper who was substituted on, whilst a full clean sheet is awarded to the goalkeeper who was on the field at the start of play.

Goalkeeper							Clean sheets		
Rk.	No.	Nat.	Goalkeeper	Games Played	Goals Against	Goals Against Average	Nemzeti Bajnokság I	Magyar Kupa	Season total
1	93	(Italy)	Riccardo Piscitelli	23	32	1.39	8	0	8
2	23	(Hungary)	Dávid Banai	4	0	0.00	1	3	4
Total					32		9	3	12

==== Penalties saving ====
Date	Goalkeeper	Penalty Kick Save	Penalty Taker	Opponent	Competition	Min.
1 March 2025	Riccardo Piscitelli	No	Rajmund Molnár	MTK	Nemzeti Bajnokság I, Round 22	(penalty scored) '38

=== Disciplinary record ===
Includes all competitions for senior teams. The list is sorted by red cards, then yellow cards (and by squad number when total cards are equal). Players with no cards not included in the list.

Rk.	No.	Pos.	Nat.	Player	Nemzeti Bajnokság I				Magyar Kupa				Season total			
Rk.	No.	Pos.	Nat.	Player	Yellow card	Second yellow card	Red card	MM	Yellow card	Second yellow card	Red card	MM	Yellow card	Second yellow card	Red card	MM
1	18	MF	(France)	Tom Lacoux	0	2	0	2	1	0	0	0	1	2	0	2
2	74	DF	(Hungary)	Dominik Kaczvinszki	1	0	1	1	0	0	0	0	1	0	1	1
3	55	DF	(Hungary)	Attila Fiola	7	0	0	1	0	0	0	0	7	0	0	1
4	25	DF	(Portugal)	André Duarte	6	0	0	1	0	0	0	0	6	0	0	1
5	9	FW	(Croatia)	Fran Brodić	4	0	0	0	1	0	0	0	5	0	0	0
5	30	DF	(Portugal)	João Nunes	5	0	0	1	0	0	0	0	5	0	0	1
5	88	MF	(Serbia)	Matija Ljujić (c)	5	0	0	1	0	0	0	0	5	0	0	1
6	44	DF	(Hungary)	Bence Gergényi	4	0	0	0	0	0	0	0	4	0	0	0
7	11	FW	(Hungary)	Krisztofer Horváth	3	0	0	0	0	0	0	0	3	0	0	0
7	26	DF	(Hungary)	Bálint Geiger	3	0	0	0	0	0	0	0	3	0	0	0
8	22	DF	(Hungary)	Krisztián Tamás	2	0	0	0	0	0	0	0	2	0	0	0
8	23	GK	(Hungary)	Dávid Banai	1	0	0	0	1	0	0	0	2	0	0	0
8	29	MF	(Nigeria)	Vincent Onovo	2	0	0	0	0	0	0	0	2	0	0	0
8	33	DF	(Hungary)	Barnabás Bese	2	0	0	0	0	0	0	0	2	0	0	0
8	47	FW	(Hungary)	Márk Mucsányi	2	0	0	0	0	0	0	0	2	0	0	0
8	77	MF	(Hungary)	Adrián Dénes	2	0	0	0	0	0	0	0	2	0	0	0
9	5	DF	(Georgia (country))	Davit Kobouri	1	0	0	0	0	0	0	0	1	0	0	0
9	6	MF	(Poland)	Damian Rasak^{⊕}	1	0	0	0	0	0	0	0	1	0	0	0
9	8	DF	(Hungary)	Márk Dékei	1	0	0	0	0	0	0	0	1	0	0	0
9	10	MF	(Hungary)	Mátyás Tajti	1	0	0	0	0	0	0	0	1	0	0	0
9	14	FW	(Georgia (country))	Giorgi Beridze^{⊕}	0	0	0	0	1	0	0	0	1	0	0	0
9	17	FW	(Romania)	George Ganea	1	0	0	0	0	0	0	0	1	0	0	0
9	21	MF	(Hungary)	Pál Helmich	1	0	0	0	0	0	0	0	1	0	0	0
9	25	DF	(Hungary)	Nimród Baranyai	1	0	0	0	0	0	0	0	1	0	0	0
9	70	FW	(France)	Mamoudou Karamoko^{*}	0	0	0	0	1	0	0	0	1	0	0	0
9	93	GK	(Italy)	Riccardo Piscitelli	1	0	0	0	0	0	0	0	1	0	0	0
Total					57	2	1	5	5	0	0	0	62	2	1	5

=== Suspensions ===
Player	Date Received	Opponent	Competition	Length of suspension			
(France) Tom Lacoux	21 September 2024	(yellow card) 23' (yellow-red card) 78' vs Diósgyőr (H)	NB I, Round 7	1 Match	Győr (H)	NB I, Round 8	27 September 2024
(Portugal) João Nunes	8 December 2024	5th (yellow card) after Debrecen (A)	NB I, Round 16	1 Match	Kecskemét (H)	NB I, Round 17	15 December 2024
(Hungary) Dominik Kaczvinszki	1 February 2025	(red card) 66' vs Diósgyőr (A)	NB I, Round 18	1 Match	Győr (A)	NB I, Round 19	8 February 2025
(France) Tom Lacoux	16 February 2025	(yellow card) (yellow-red card) 75' vs Zalaegerszeg (H)	NB I, Round 20	1 Match	Nyíregyháza (A)	NB I, Round 21	22 February 2025
(Hungary) Attila Fiola	16 February 2025	5th (yellow card) after Zalaegerszeg (H)	NB I, Round 20	1 Match	Nyíregyháza (A)	NB I, Round 21	22 February 2025
(Portugal) André Duarte	22 February 2025	5th (yellow card) after Nyíregyháza (A)	NB I, Round 21	1 Match	MTK (A)	NB I, Round 22	1 March 2025
(Serbia) Matija Ljujić	22 February 2025	5th (yellow card) after Nyíregyháza (A)	NB I, Round 21	1 Match	MTK (A)	NB I, Round 22	1 March 2025

=== Injuries ===
Player	Date	Offence	Competition	Ref.
(Hungary) Krisztofer Horváth	6 October 2024	(substituted off) 60' vs Zalaegerszeg (A)	Nemzeti Bajnokság I, Round 9	
(Italy) Riccardo Piscitelli	8 November 2024	(substituted off) 73' vs Debrecen (A)	Nemzeti Bajnokság I, Round 16	Round 16

=== Captains ===
Includes all competitions for senior teams. The list is sorted by squad number when season-total number of games where a player started as captain are equal. Players with no games started as captain not included in the list.

Rk.	No.	Pos.	Nat.	Player	Nemzeti Bajnokság I	Magyar Kupa	Season total
1	88	MF	(Serbia)	Matija Ljujić (c)	20	1	21
2	55	DF	(Hungary)	Attila Fiola	8	0	8
3	30	DF	(Portugal)	João Nunes	4	0	4
4	23	GK	(Hungary)	Dávid Banai	0	3	3
5	7	MF	(Hungary)	Krisztián Simon	1	0	1
Total					33	4	37

== Attendances ==
The table contains the number of attendances of Újpest FC domestic matches.
Clicking on the competitions leads to the number of spectators for all the matches of the competitions.
The gold indicates the highest attendances, and the lowest attendances with pink .
Home stadium: Szusza Ferenc Stadion, Budapest • Capacity: 12,670

League	Matches	Attendances	Average		High		Low	
League	Matches	Attendances	Att.	%	Att.	%	Att.	%
Nemzeti Bajnokság I	17	95,296	5,606	44.2%	10,273	81.1%	3,702	29.2%
Magyar Kupa	—	—	—	—	—	—	—	—
Total	17	95,296	5,606	44.2%	10,273	81.1%	3,702	29.2%

Nemzeti Bajnokság I
Round	Date	Opponent	Attendances	%	Ref.
Round 1	28 July 2024	Puskás Akadémia	9,112	71.9%	
Round 3	11 August 2024	Fehérvár	5,518	43.6%	
Round 5	23 August 2024	Debrecen	5,779	45.6%	
Round 7	21 September 2024	Diósgyőr	8,562	67.6%	
Round 8	27 September 2024	Győr	7,120	56.2%	
Round 10	19 October 2024	Nyíregyháza	6,039	47.6%	
Round 13	9 November 2024	Paks	5,241	41.3%	
Round 15	1 December 2024	Ferencváros	10,273	81.1%	
Round 17	15 December 2024	Kecskemét	150 (PCD)	—	
Round 20	16 February 2025	Zalaegerszeg	4,082	32.2%	
Round 22	1 March 2025	MTK	3,702	29.2%	
Round 23	9 March 2025	Puskás Akadémia	3,807	30.0%	
Round 25	30 March 2025	Fehérvár	5,074	40.0%	
Round 27	13 April 2024	Debrecen	5,502	43.4%	
Round 29	26 April 2024	Diósgyőr	5,187	40.9%	
Round 30	3 May 2024	Győr	4,952	39.1%	
Round 32	16 May 2024	Nyíregyháza	5,196	41.0%	
Total			95,296	—	
Average			5,606	44.2%	

Magyar Kupa
Round	Date	Opponent	Attendances	%	Ref.
Total			0	—	
Average			0		

== Awards and nominations ==
Keys
M	Matches	W	Won	D	Drawn	L	Lost
Pts	Points	GF	Goals for	GA	Goals against	GD	Goal difference
Pos.	Position	Pld	Played	G	Goals	A	Assists
(H)	Újpest FC were the home team.			(A)	Újpest FC were the away team.		
Player	Young Hungarian Player, who is a Hungarian player and was born 2004 or after						
Player^{*}	Player who joined Újpest FC permanently or on loan during the season						
Player^{†}	Player who departed Újpest FC permanently or on loan during the season						

=== Monthly awards ===
Player of the Month, Coach of the Month, Most beautiful goal of the Month and Most beautiful saving of the Month by MLSZ (Hungarian Football Federation) and M4 Sport TV of Nemzeti Bajnokság.

Month	Player	Coach	Goal	Saving	Ref.
November				Riccardo Piscitelli in Round 14 vs Fehérvár, Gradisar '94 min.	

=== Weekly awards ===
==== Player of the Round ====
Selection of the Round of Nemzeti Bajnokság by M4 Sport TV, Nemzeti Sport, Csakfoci and Sofascore websites and Player of the Week (POW) by Nemzeti Sport.

Round	Opponent	Pos.	Player	Selection of the Round				POW	Ref.
Round	Opponent	Pos.	Player	Nemzeti Sport	M4 Sport TV	Csakfoci	Sofascore	POW	Ref.
Round 1	Puskás Akadémia (H)	GK	(Italy) Riccardo Piscitelli			Yes			
Round 3	Fehérvár (H)	DF	(Portugal) João Nunes			Yes			
Round 3	Fehérvár (H)	DF	(Hungary) Barnabás Bese			Yes	Yes		
Round 3	Fehérvár (H)	FW	(Serbia) Matija Ljujić (c)			Yes	Yes		
Round 4	Ferencváros (A)	GK	(Italy) Riccardo Piscitelli				Yes		
Round 5	Debrecen (H)	MF	(Hungary) Bálint Geiger				Yes		
Round 6	Kecskemét (A)	DF	(Hungary) Barnabás Bese			Yes			
Round 6	Kecskemét (A)	DF	(Portugal) João Nunes				Yes		
Round 6	Kecskemét (A)	MF	(Hungary) Bálint Geiger		Yes		Yes		
Round 6	Kecskemét (A)	MF	(Serbia) Matija Ljujić (c)		Yes		Yes		
Round 6	Kecskemét (A)	FW	(Croatia) Fran Brodić		Yes	Yes	Yes		
Round 6	Kecskemét (A)	FW	(Hungary) Krisztofer Horváth		Yes				
Round 7	Diósgyőr (H)	GK	(Italy) Riccardo Piscitelli			Yes			
Round 8	Győr (H)	DF	(Hungary) Barnabás Bese			Yes			
Round 9	Zalaegerszeg (A)	MF	(France) Tom Lacoux				Yes		
Round 9	Zalaegerszeg (A)	FW	(Serbia) Matija Ljujić (c)		Yes	Yes	Yes		
Round 10	Nyíregyháza (H)	DF	(Portugal) André Duarte		Yes	Yes	Yes		
Round 12	Puskás Akadémia (A)	GK	(Italy) Riccardo Piscitelli				Yes		
Round 12	Puskás Akadémia (A)	DF	(Hungary) Bálint Geiger		Yes				
Round 13	Paks (H)	DF	(Portugal) André Duarte				Yes		
Round 13	Paks (H)	DF	(Portugal) João Nunes				Yes		
Round 14	Fehérvár (A)	GK	(Italy) Riccardo Piscitelli			Yes	Yes		
Round 14	Fehérvár (A)	DF	(Portugal) André Duarte				Yes		
Round 14	Fehérvár (A)	MF	(Hungary) Mátyás Tajti			Yes	Yes		
Round 14	Fehérvár (A)	FW	(Croatia) Fran Brodić				Yes		
Round 15	Ferencváros (H)	GK	(Italy) Riccardo Piscitelli			Yes			
Round 15	Ferencváros (H)	DF	(Portugal) André Duarte				Yes		
Round 16	Debrecen (A)	MF	(France) Tom Lacoux		Yes	Yes	Yes		
Round 16	Debrecen (A)	FW	(Croatia) Fran Brodić			Yes			
Round 17	Kecskemét (H)	DF	(Portugal) André Duarte				Yes		
Round 18	Diósgyőr (A)	MF	(France) Tom Lacoux				Yes		
Round 18	Diósgyőr (A)	FW	(Hungary) Mamoudou Karamoko		Yes		Yes		
Round 20	Zalaegerszeg (H)	FW	(Croatia) Fran Brodić				Yes		
Round 23	Puskás Akadémia (H)	DF	(Portugal) João Nunes			Yes			
Round 23	Puskás Akadémia (H)	FW	(Croatia) Fran Brodić		Yes				

(s) Substitute

==== Goal of the Round ====
Goal of the Round of Nemzeti Bajnokság by the M4 Sport website.

Keys

- Score – The score at the time of the goal. Újpest FC's score listed first.
- Final score – The score at full time; Újpest FC's listed first.

Round	Pos.	Player	Placement	Score	Final score	Opponent	Date	Ref.

== Milestones ==
Keys
Final score	The score at full time; Újpest FC's listed first.	No.	Squad number	Pos.	Position
Opponent	The opponent team without a flag is Hungarian.	(N)	The game was played at a neutral site.		
(H)	Újpest FC were the home team.	(A)	Újpest FC were the away team.		
Player^{*}	Player who joined Újpest FC permanently or on loan during the season				
Player^{†}	Player who departed Újpest FC permanently or on loan during the season				

Debuts

The following players made their competitive debuts for Újpest FC's first team during the campaign.

Date	No.	Pos.	Player	Age	Final score	Opponent	Competition	Ref.
11 August 2024	4	DF	(Hungary) Levente Babós	20	4–1	Fehérvár (H)	Nemzeti Bajnokság I, Round 3	
17 August 2024	57	FW	(Hungary) Ákos Tóth	19	0–1	Ferencváros (A)	Nemzeti Bajnokság I, Round 4	
14 September 2024	21	MF	(Hungary) Pál Helmich	19	7–0	Fémalk-Dunavarsány (A)	Magyar Kupa, Round of 64	
14 September 2024	74	DF	(Hungary) Dominik Kaczvinszki	18	7–0	Fémalk-Dunavarsány (A)	Magyar Kupa, Round of 64	
1 February 2025	6	MF	(Poland) Damian Rasak	28	1–1	Diósgyőr (A)	Nemzeti Bajnokság I, Round 18	
1 February 2025	34	FW	(Serbia) Milan Tučić	28	1–1	Diósgyőr (A)	Nemzeti Bajnokság I, Round 18	
8 February 2025	38	FW	(Hungary) Kristóf Sarkadi	18	0–3	Győr (A)	Nemzeti Bajnokság I, Round 19	
16 February 2025	14	FW	(Georgia (country)) Giorgi Beridze	27	1–2	Zalaegerszeg (H)	Nemzeti Bajnokság I, Round 20	
9 March 2025	17	FW	(Romania) George Ganea	25	1–1	Puskás Akadémia (H)	Nemzeti Bajnokság I, Round 23	

50th appearances

The following players made their 50th appearances for Újpest FC's first team during the campaign.

Date	No.	Pos.	Player	Age	Final score	Opponent	Competition	Ref.
23 November 2024	88	MF	(Serbia) Matija Ljujić	31	1–0	Fehérvár (A)	Nemzeti Bajnokság I, Round 14	

First goals

The following players scored their first goals for Újpest FC's first team during the campaign.

Keys

- Score – The score at the time of the goal. Újpest FC's score listed first.
- Final score – The score at full time; Újpest FC's listed first.

Date	No.	Pos.	Player	Age	Score	Final score	Opponent	Competition	Ref.
8 December 2024	27	MF	(France) Tom Lacoux	22	2–1	2–1	Debrecen (A)	Nemzeti Bajnokság I, Round 16	
26 February 2025	14	FW	(Georgia (country)) Giorgi Beridze^{⊕}	27	1–0	1–0	Dorog (A)	Magyar Kupa, Round of 16	

== See also ==
- Ferencvárosi TC–Újpest FC rivalry: local derby between Ferencváros and Újpest
