= List of Hungarian football transfers summer 2024 =

This is a list of Hungarian football transfers for the 2024 summer transfer window. Only transfers featuring Nemzeti Bajnokság I are listed.

== Nemzeti Bajnokság I ==
Note: Flags indicate national team as has been defined under FIFA eligibility rules. Players may hold more than one non-FIFA nationality.

=== Ferencváros ===
In:

No.	Pos.	Nation	Player
34	DF	BRA	Raul Gustavo (from (Brazil) Corinthians)
35	MF	BRA	Kady Borges (from (Russia) Krasnodar)
70	MF	GHA	Isaac Pappoe (from (Switzerland) Aarau)
88	MF	BEL	Philippe Rommens (from (Netherlands) Go Ahead Eagles)
3	DF	DEN	Stefan Gartenmann (from (Denmark) Midtjylland)
93	FW	SUR	Virgil Misidjan (from (Saudi Arabia) Al-Tai)
22	DF	HUN	Gábor Szalai (from (Switzerland) Lausanne-Sport)
11	MF	BRA	Matheus Saldanha (from (Serbia) Partizan)

Out:

No.	Pos.	Nation	Player
3	DF	MAR	Samy Mmaee (to (Croatia) Dinamo Zagreb)
5	MF	BIH	Muhamed Bešić (free agent)
10	FW	BRA	Marquinhos (to (Russia) Spartak Moscow)
11	FW	BIH	Kenan Kodro (on loan to (Turkey) Gaziantep)
31	DF	USA	Henry Wingo (to (Canada) Toronto FC)
68	FW	HUN	Ádám Halmai (on loan to Soroksár)
76	MF	HUN	Krisztián Lisztes (to (Germany) Eintracht Frankfurt)
—	MF	HUN	András Csonka (to Zalaegerszeg, previously on loan at Budafok)
22	DF	SUR	Myenty Abena (to (Russia) Spartak Moscow)
14	MF	BIH	Amer Gojak (to (Croatia) Rijeka)
33	MF	BIH	Stjepan Lončar (to (Poland) Lech Poznań)
77	MF	ARM	Edgar Sevikyan (on loan to (Russia) Lokomotiv Moscow)
40	FW	NGA	Fortune Bassey (on loan to (Slovakia) DAC)

=== Paks ===
In:

No.	Pos.	Nation	Player

Out:

No.	Pos.	Nation	Player

=== Puskás Akadémia ===
In: Note: Flags indicate national team as defined under FIFA eligibility rules; some limited exceptions apply. Players may hold more than one non-FIFA nationality.

No.	Pos.	Nation	Player
—	FW	MNG	Ganbayar Ganbold (loan return from (Slovakia) Komárno)
—	FW	UKR	Yevgeniy Kichun (loan return from (Hungary) Gyirmót)
—	MF	HUN	Marcell Major (loan return from (Hungary) Csákvár)
—	MF	HUN	Márton Radics (loan return from (Hungary) Mosonmagyaróvár)
—	MF	CPV	Laros Duarte (from (Netherlands) Groningen)

Out: Note: Flags indicate national team as defined under FIFA eligibility rules; some limited exceptions apply. Players may hold more than one non-FIFA nationality.

No.	Pos.	Nation	Player
—	MF	HUN	Martin Auerbach (to (Hungary) Budafok)
—	DF	HUN	Levente Babós (to (Hungary) Újpest)
—	MF	HUN	Bence Batik (to (Hungary) Debrecen)
—	MF	HUN	Martin Kern (to (Austria) Sturm Graz)
—	MF	NED	Luciano Slagveer (End of contract)
—	GK	HUN	Tóth Balázs (to (Hungary) Fehérvár)
—	MF	ROU	Marius Corbu (to (Cyprus) APOEL)
—	MF	HUN	Gergő Ominger (on loan to (Hungary) Fehérvár)
44	MF	HUN	Szabolcs Dusinszki (on loan to (Hungary) Csákvár)
—	MF	HUN	Patrik Posztobányi (on loan to Mezőkövesdi SE)
—	MF	HUN	Balázs Bakti (on loan to Zalaegerszeg)
—	DF	HUN	Bendegúz Farkas (on loan to Nyíregyháza)

==== Out on loan ====
Note: Flags indicate national team as defined under FIFA eligibility rules; some limited exceptions apply. Players may hold more than one non-FIFA nationality.

No.	Pos.	Nation	Player
—	MF	HUN	Balázs Bakti (at Zalaegerszeg until 30 June 2025)
—	MF	HUN	Patrik Posztobányi (at Mezőkövesd until 30 June 2025)
—	DF	HUN	Bendegúz Farkas (at Nyíregyháza until 30 June 2025)
44	MF	HUN	Szabolcs Dusinszki (at Csákvár until 30 June 2025)
—	MF	HUN	Gergő Ominger (at Fehérvár until 30 June 2025)
—	MF	HUN	Patrik Posztobányi (at Mezőkövesdi SE until 30 June 2025)

=== Fehérvár ===
In: Note: Flags indicate national team as defined under FIFA eligibility rules; some limited exceptions apply. Players may hold more than one non-FIFA nationality.

No.	Pos.	Nation	Player
74	FW	HUN	Bence Babos (loan return from (Hungary) Ajka)
57	GK	HUN	Martin Dala (loan return from (Hungary) Nyíregyháza)
6	MF	FRA	Franck Bambock (loan return from (Greece) Panetolikos)
10	FW	KOS	Lirim Kastrati (loan return from (Croatia) Zagreb)
22	GK	HUN	Balázs Tóth (from (Hungary) Puskás Akadémia)
8	MF	UKR	Bohdan Melnyk (from (Hungary) Kisvárda)
27	MF	HUN	Bence Bedi (from (Hungary) Zalaegerszeg)
21	DF	HUN	András Huszti (on loan from (Hungary) Zalaegerszeg)
15	MF	HUN	Mátyás Kovács (on loan from (Hungary) MTK Budapest)
30	MF	HUN	Gergő Ominger (on loan from (Hungary) Puskás Akadémia)
70	FW	HUN	Filip Holender (on loan from (Hungary) Vasas)
7	DF	CRO	Ivan Miličević (from (Croatia) Lokomotiva Zagreb)
23	MF	HUN	Bálint Szabó (on loan from (Hungary) Paks)
97	FW	UKR	Daniel Kiwinda (from (Ukraine) Dnipro-1)
1	GK	HUN	Gergely Nagy (from (Greece) PAS Giannina)

Out: Note: Flags indicate national team as defined under FIFA eligibility rules; some limited exceptions apply. Players may hold more than one non-FIFA nationality.

No.	Pos.	Nation	Player
5	DF	HUN	Attila Fiola (End to contract)
33	DF	HUN	Barnabás Bese (to (Hungary) Újpest)
18	MF	HUN	Dávid Sigér (to (Romania) Sepsi)
11	FW	HUN	Levente Szabó (to (Germany) Eintracht Braunschweig)
42	GK	SRB	Emil Rockov (to (Bosnia and Herzegovina) Sarajevo)
21	MF	POR	Rúben Pinto (to (Portugal) Torreense)
65	DF	HUN	Szilveszter Hangya (End to contract)
44	DF	HUN	Bence Gergényi (to (Hungary) Újpest)
7	DF	HUN	Szabolcs Schön (to (England) Bolton Wanderers)
5	DF	HUN	Attila Fiola (to (Hungary) Újpest)
22	GK	HUN	Balázs Tóth (to (England) Blackburn Rovers)
23	FW	HUN	Marcell Berki (to (Hungary) Kecskemét)
20	MF	NOR	Tobias Christensen (to (Romania) Rapid Bucuresti)
6	MF	FRA	Franck Bambock (to (Cyprus) AEL Limassol)

=== Debrecen ===
In: Note: Flags indicate national team as defined under FIFA eligibility rules; some limited exceptions apply. Players may hold more than one non-FIFA nationality.

No.	Pos.	Nation	Player
—	MF	HUN	Máté Tuboly (loan return from (Hungary) Győr)
—	FW	SRB	Andrija Majdevac (loan return from (Serbia) Kruševac)
89	MF	GRE	Alexandros Kyziridis (loan return from (Slovenia) Mura)
8	FW	HUN	Tamás Szűcs (from (Denmark) Copenhagen)
5	DF	HUN	Bence Batik (from (Hungary) Puskás Akadémia)
86	GK	HUN	Donát Pálfi (from (Hungary) Haladás)
24	FW	JPN	Naoaki Senaga (from (Montenegro) Jezero)
30	DF	SRB	Aranđel Stojković (from (Serbia) Partizan)
—	FW	HUN	Máté Kohut (from (Hungary) Debreceni VSC II)
23	MF	ARM	Zhirayr Shaghoyan (on loan from (Armenia) Ararat)
6	MF	CRO	Neven Đurasek (from (Greece) Aris)
42	FW	CIV	Yacouba Silue (from (Serbia) Mladost Lučani)
26	MF	BRA	Victor Braga (from (Kazakhstan) Zhetysu)
—	DF	HUN	Gergő Kocsis (from (Hungary) MTK Budapest)

Out: Note: Flags indicate national team as defined under FIFA eligibility rules; some limited exceptions apply. Players may hold more than one non-FIFA nationality.

No.	Pos.	Nation	Player
67	FW	SUI	João Oliveira (to (Poland) Gdynia)
—	MF	HUN	Máté Tuboly (to (Slovakia) DAC)
25	DF	HUN	Nimród Baranyai (to (Hungary) Újpest)
—	FW	SRB	Andrija Majdevac (to (Greece) Panetolikos)
20	MF	MNE	Stefan Lončar (to (Russia) Tolyatti)
27	MF	HUN	Ádám Bódi (to (Hungary) Kazincbarcika)
21	DF	UKR	Oleksandr Romanchuk (to (Ukraine) Kryvbas Kryvyi Rih)
—	FW	HUN	Erik Kócs-Washburn (to (Hungary) Kozármisleny)
15	MF	ESP	Christian Manrique (to (Spain) Alcorcón)
18	MF	NGA	Hamzat Ojediran (to (France) Lens)
89	MF	GRE	Alexandros Kyziridis (End to contract)

=== Kecskemét ===
In:

No.	Pos.	Nation	Player

Out:

No.	Pos.	Nation	Player

=== Diósgyőr ===
In: Note: Flags indicate national team as defined under FIFA eligibility rules; some limited exceptions apply. Players may hold more than one non-FIFA nationality.

No.	Pos.	Nation	Player
19	MF	HUN	Máté Herbák (from (Germany) Bergfried Leverkusen)
7	FW	MNE	Marko Rakonjac (on loan from (Serbia) Topola)
96	FW	HUN	Marcell Huszár (on loan from (Hungary) Győri ETO FC)
26	DF	SRB	Uroš Drezgić (on loan from (Russia) Rubin Kazan)
15	DF	BIH	Siniša Saničanin (from (Serbia) Partizan)
68	FW	HUN	Zétény Varga (on loan from (Hungary) Ferencváros)
30	GK	CRO	Karlo Sentić (from (Kazakhstan) Ordabasy)
75	FW	MAR	Moha Rharsalla (from (Slovakia) Košice)
99	FW	MNE	Nikola Gluščević (from (Slovenia) Dekani)
33	DF	IRL	Valentino Adedokun (on loan from (England) Brentford)

Out: Note: Flags indicate national team as defined under FIFA eligibility rules; some limited exceptions apply. Players may hold more than one non-FIFA nationality.

No.	Pos.	Nation	Player
7	MF	HUN	István Csirmaz (to (Hungary) Mezőkövesd)
28	FW	BRA	Pernambuco (End of contract)
—	MF	HUN	Ádám Szamosi (to (Hungary) Kazincbarcika)
32	GK	HUN	Balázs Tóth (to (Hungary) Nyíregyháza)
27	FW	HUN	Levente Szabó (to (Germany) Eintracht Braunschweig)
37	DF	CZE	Ondřej Bačo (to (Israel) Ironi Tiberias)
16	MF	HUN	Tamás Kispál (End of contract)
8	MF	HUN	Borisz Tóth (End of contract)
36	DF	HUN	Ádám Viczián (End of contract)
15	DF	NGA	Godfrey Stephen (End of contract)
—	FW	GAB	Jérémie Obounet (to (Spain) Antequera)

==== Out on loan ====
Note: Flags indicate national team as defined under FIFA eligibility rules; some limited exceptions apply. Players may hold more than one non-FIFA nationality.

No.	Pos.	Nation	Player
4	DF	HUN	Szilárd Bokros (loan to (Slovakia) Košice)
22	GK	HUN	Bogdán Bánhegyi (loan to (Hungary) Kazincbarcika)
14	MF	HUN	Gergő Csatári (loan to (Hungary) Kazincbarcika)

=== MTK ===
In:

No.	Pos.	Nation	Player

Out:

No.	Pos.	Nation	Player

=== Zalaegerszeg ===
In:

No.	Pos.	Nation	Player
8	MF	HUN	András Csonka (from Ferencváros, previously on loan at Budafok)

Out:

No.	Pos.	Nation	Player

=== Újpest ===
In: Note: Flags indicate national team as defined under FIFA eligibility rules; some limited exceptions apply. Players may hold more than one non-FIFA nationality.

No.	Pos.	Nation	Player
25	DF	HUN	Nimród Baranyai (from (Hungary) Debrecen)
74	DF	HUN	Dominik Kaczvinszki (from (Hungary) Budapest Honvéd)
44	DF	POR	Bence Gergényi (from (Hungary) Fehérvár)
30	DF	POR	João Nunes (from (Portugal) Casa Pia)
70	FW	FRA	Mamoudou Karamoko (on loan from (Denmark) Copenhagen)
9	FW	CRO	Fran Brodić (from (Croatia) Varaždin)
35	DF	POR	André Duarte (from (Croatia) Osijek)
27	MF	FRA	Tom Lacoux (from (France) Bordeaux)
55	DF	HUN	Attila Fiola (from (Hungary) Fehérvár)
11	FW	HUN	Krisztofer Horváth (from (Hungary) Kecskemét)
—	MF	HUN	Pál Helmich (from (Hungary) Kecskemét)

Out: Note: Flags indicate national team as defined under FIFA eligibility rules; some limited exceptions apply. Players may hold more than one non-FIFA nationality.

No.	Pos.	Nation	Player
77	FW	HUN	Kevin Csoboth (to (Switzerland) St. Gallen)
19	MF	CIV	Aboubakar Keita (End to contract)

=== Nyíregyháza ===
In:

No.	Pos.	Nation	Player

Out:

No.	Pos.	Nation	Player

=== Győr ===
In:

No.	Pos.	Nation	Player

Out:

No.	Pos.	Nation	Player

== See also ==
- 2024–25 Nemzeti Bajnokság I
