= Krisztofer Horváth =

Hungarian footballer (born 2002)

Personal information
- Full name: Horváth Krisztofer György
- Date of birth: 8 January 2002 (age 24)
- Place of birth: Hévíz, Hungary
- Height: 1.72 m (5 ft 8 in)
- Position: Midfielder

Team information
- Current team: Újpest
- Number: 11

Youth career
- –2013: Hévíz SK
- –2019: Zalaegerszeg
- 2019–2020: SPAL

Senior career*
Years	Team	Apps	(Gls)
2018–2019	Zalaegerszeg	23	(2)
2020	SPAL	3	(0)
2020–2024	Torino	0	(0)
2021–2022	→ Szeged-Csanád (loan)	30	(19)
2022–2023	→ Debrecen (loan)	7	(0)
2023–2024	→ Kecskemét (loan)	46	(17)
2024–	Újpest	56	(9)

International career^{‡}
2017	Hungary U16	1	(0)
2022–2023	Hungary U21	6	(2)
2023–	Hungary	2	(0)
- * Club domestic league appearances and goals as of 30 May 2026 ‡ National team caps and goals as of 21 November 2023

Horváth Krisztofer György (born 8 January 2002) is a Hungarian professional footballer who plays as a midfielder for Újpest and the Hungary national team.

== Club career ==
On 26 July 2020, Horváth made his Serie A debut for SPAL in a 1–1 home draw against Torino.

On 25 September 2020, he joined Torino.

On 10 August 2022, Horváth was loaned to Debrecen. On 16 January 2023, he moved on a new loan to Kecskemét.

=== Újpest ===
On 29 August 2024, Horváth signed with Újpest. On 17 April 2026, he scored a hat-trick in a 7–2 victory over Nyíregyháza Spartacus FC in the 2025–26 Nemzeti Bajnokság I season.

== International career ==
Horváth was first called up for the Hungary national football team in September 2023, making his debut as a 72nd-minute substitute for Callum Styles in a 1–1 draw with Czechia on 10 September.

On 14 May 2024, Horváth was named in Hungary's squad for UEFA Euro 2024. He was an unused substitute in all three of the team's Group A matches.

== Career statistics ==
=== Club ===
As of match played 30 August 2025.

Appearances and goals by club, season and competition
Club	Season	League			Cup		Continental		Other		Total	
Club	Season	Division	Apps	Goals	Apps	Goals	Apps	Goals	Apps	Goals	Apps	Goals
Zalaegerszegi	2017–18	Nemzeti Bajnokság II	8	1	0	0	–		–		8	1
Zalaegerszegi	2018–19	Nemzeti Bajnokság II	14	1	1	0	–		–		15	1
Zalaegerszegi	Total		22	2	1	0	–		–		23	2
S.P.A.L.	2019–20	Serie A	3	0	1	0	–		0	0	4	0
Torino	2020–21	Serie A	0	0	1	0	–		0	0	1	0
Torino	2024–25	Serie A	0	0	0	0	–		–		0	0
Torino	Total		0	0	1	0	–		0	0	1	0
Szeged-Csanád (loan)	2021–22	Nemzeti Bajnokság II	30	19	3	0	–		–		33	19
Debreceni (loan)	2022–23	Nemzeti Bajnokság I	7	0	2	1	–		–		9	1
Kecskeméti (loan)	2022–23	Nemzeti Bajnokság I	15	6	0	0	–		–		15	6
Kecskeméti (loan)	2023–24	Nemzeti Bajnokság I	31	11	2	1	–		–		33	12
Kecskeméti (loan)	Total		46	17	2	1	–		–		48	18
Újpest	2024–25	Nemzeti Bajnokság I	27	2	1	0	–		–		28	2
Újpest	2025–26	Nemzeti Bajnokság I	6	2	0	0	–		–		6	2
Újpest	Total		33	4	1	0	–		–		34	4
Career total			141	42	11	2	0	0	0	0	152	44

=== International ===
As of match played 19 November 2023

Appearances and goals by national team and year
National team	Year	Apps	Goals
Hungary	2023	2	0
Total		2	0
