= Davit Kobouri =

Georgian association football player

Personal information
- Date of birth: 24 January 1998 (age 28)
- Place of birth: Telavi, Georgia
- Height: 1.88 m (6 ft 2 in)
- Position: Defender

Team information
- Current team: Újpest
- Number: 5

Youth career
- Dinamo Tbilisi

Senior career*
Years	Team	Apps	(Gls)
2015–2023	Dinamo Tbilisi	166	(3)
2022	→ Karvina (loan)	13	(0)
2024–	Újpest	26	(0)

International career^{‡}
2014–2015	Georgia U17	6	(0)
2017–2018	Georgia U19	3	(0)
2017–2020	Georgia U21	10	(0)
- * Club domestic league appearances and goals as of 7 April 2025 ‡ National team caps and goals as of 7 April 2025

Davit Kobouri (Georgian: დავით კობოური, born 14 January 1998) is a Georgian footballer who plays as a centre back for Hungarian club Újpest.

Kobouri is the four-time Erovnuli Liga winner with Dinamo Tbilisi. He has also won the Supercup three times and the Georgian Cup once.

== Career ==
=== Club ===
Kobouri started his career at Dinamo Tbilisi in 2014. He first played in the reserves before making his debut for the senior team on 28 November 2015 in a 2–0 away win over Guria. Kobouri was 18 years old when he first lifted both the league and cup trophies as Dinamo sealed their 10th domestic double in 2016.

In 2020, Kobouri was named by the Erovnuli Liga in Team of the Year with Dinamo claiming yet another league title.

In January 2022, he signed a loan deal with Czech side Karvina, which lasted six months. The next year, Kobouri left Dinamo after a ten-year tenure. During this period, he won the league four times in addition to securing four more Super cup and national cup titles combined. He took part in 16 games across all three UEFA club competitions.

Kobouri moved to Hungarian top-tier club Ujpest in February 2024.

=== International ===
Kobouri played for the national youth teams starting from U17s. He took part in all six games of the 2015 UEFA European under-17 Championship qualifying campaign in full. In 2017, Kobouri led the U19 team participating in 2017 UEFA European Championship as the team captain in qualifying matches in Georgia. Two months later, he made his debut as a substitute for U21s against Poland.

In September 2020, the national team coach Vladimir Weiss called up Kobouri for UEFA Nations League matches against Estonia and N.Macedonia.

== Honours ==
=== Club ===
Dinamo Tbilisi

- Erovnuli Liga: 2015–16, 2019, 2020, 2022
- Georgian Cup: 2015–16
- Super Cup: 2016, 2021, 2023

=== Individual ===
- Team of the Year: 2020
