= Riccardo Piscitelli =

Italian footballer

Personal information
- Date of birth: 10 October 1993 (age 33)
- Place of birth: Vimercate, Italy
- Height: 1.89 m (6 ft 2 1/2 in)
- Position: Goalkeeper

Team information
- Current team: Újpest
- Number: 1

Youth career
- 2003–2012: AC Milan

Senior career*
Years	Team	Apps	(Gls)
2012–2013	AC Milan	0	(0)
2012–2013	→ Carrarese (loan)	23	(0)
2013–2018	Benevento	24	(0)
2018–2019	Carpi	18	(0)
2019–2020	Dinamo București	26	(0)
2020–2021	Nacional	11	(0)
2021–2024	Mezőkövesd	61	(0)
2024–	Újpest	43	(0)

International career
2011	Italy U18	2	(0)
2011–2012	Italy U19	3	(0)
2012–2013	Italy U20	3	(0)
2012	Italy U21	1	(0)
- * Club domestic league appearances and goals as of 19 January 2026

Riccardo Piscitelli (born 10 October 1993) is an Italian professional footballer who plays as a goalkeeper for Nemzeti Bajnokság I club Újpest.

== Club career ==
After leaving Benevento, agent Alessio Sundas remarked that Piscitelli is a goalkeeper who had shown huge experience contributing to the rise of Benevento. While Piscitelli was on trial at Vis Pesaro where he played for the team in friendly matches, Sundas engaged foreign teams for his transfer.

On 5 December 2018, he signed a contract until the end of the 2018–19 season with Serie B club Carpi.

On 28 June 2019, Piscitelli joined Romanian club Dinamo București. He left Dinamo after only one season and signed a contract with Portuguese club C.D. Nacional.

On 21 July 2021, he signed with Mezőkövesd in Hungary.

== International career ==
Piscitelli played for the Italy U-20 three times, in September 2012 against Turkey, (Note: As Turkey U21 for 2013 edition was eliminated on 14 August 2012, the Turkey national under-20 football team (born 1992 and 1993 team) of 2012–13 season immediately became U21 team, thus the age limit of the match was born 1992 on both sides but Italy considered it was U20 match but Turkey considered it was a U21 match.) March 2013 against Poland and June 2013 also against Poland.

== Honours ==
Benevento

- Lega Pro: 2015–16 (group C)
