= Pál Helmich =

Hungarian footballer (born 2004)

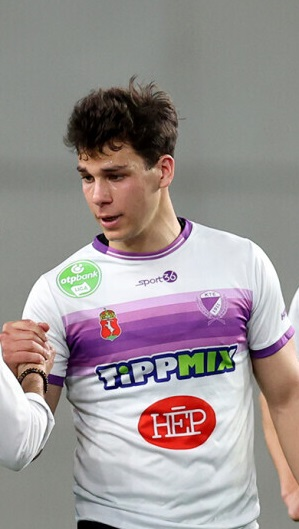
- Helmich playing for Kecskemét in 2024

Personal information
- Full name: Pál Boldizsár Helmich
- Date of birth: 20 November 2004 (age 21)
- Place of birth: Budapest, Hungary
- Height: 1.78 m (5 ft 10 in)
- Position: Midfielder

Team information
- Current team: Újpest
- Number: 21

Youth career
- 2018–2019: Reinickendorf Füchse
- 2019–2023: Viktoria Berlin

Senior career*
Years	Team	Apps	(Gls)
2023–2024	ESMTK	10	(1)
2024	Kecskemét	16	(2)
2024	Kecskemét II	1	(1)
2024–	Újpest	2	(0)
2024–	Újpest II	10	(1)

International career
2024	Hungary U20	2	(0)
- * Club domestic league appearances and goals as of 30 May 2026

Pál Boldizsár Helmich (born 20 November 2004) is a Hungarian professional footballer who plays as a midfielder for Nemzeti Bajnokság I club Újpest.

== Career ==
Helmich began his youth career in Germany with Reinickendorf Füchse and later continued at Viktoria Berlin before moving to Hungary in August 2023 to join ESMTK. After half a season, he signed for Nemzeti Bajnokság I club Kecskemét, where he became a regular starter in the spring campaign, making 12 appearances with two goals and two assists. In the 2024–25 season he featured in four league matches before seeking a transfer. He subsequently joined Nemzeti Bajnokság I side Újpest for an undisclosed fee after the clubs reached an agreement on 3 September 2024.

On 29 January 2025, Helmich suffered a metatarsal fracture during training in January, as announced by Újpest.

== Career statistics ==
=== Club ===
As of match played 13 February 2026

Appearances and goals by club, season and competition
Club	Season	League			Magyar Kupa		Total	
Club	Season	Division	Apps	Goals	Apps	Goals	Apps	Goals
ESMTK	2023–24	Nemzeti Bajnokság III	10	1	3	1	13	2
Kecskemét	2023–24	Nemzeti Bajnokság I	12	2	0	0	12	2
Kecskemét	2024–25	Nemzeti Bajnokság I	4	0	—		4	0
Kecskemét	Total		16	2	0	0	16	2
Kecskemét II	2023–24	Nemzeti Bajnokság III	1	0	—		1	0
Újpest	2024–25	Nemzeti Bajnokság I	2	0	1	0	3	0
Újpest	2025–26	Nemzeti Bajnokság I	0	0	0	0	0	0
Újpest	Total		2	0	1	0	3	0
Újpest II	2024–25	Nemzeti Bajnokság III	1	0	—		1	0
Újpest II	2025–26	Nemzeti Bajnokság III	2	1	—		2	1
Újpest II	Total		3	1	—		3	1
Career total			32	4	4	1	36	5

=== International ===
Appearances and goals by national team and year
Team	Year	Total	
Team	Year	Apps	Goals
Hungary U20	2024	2	0
Career total		2	0
