= Mamoudou Karamoko =

French footballer (born 1999)

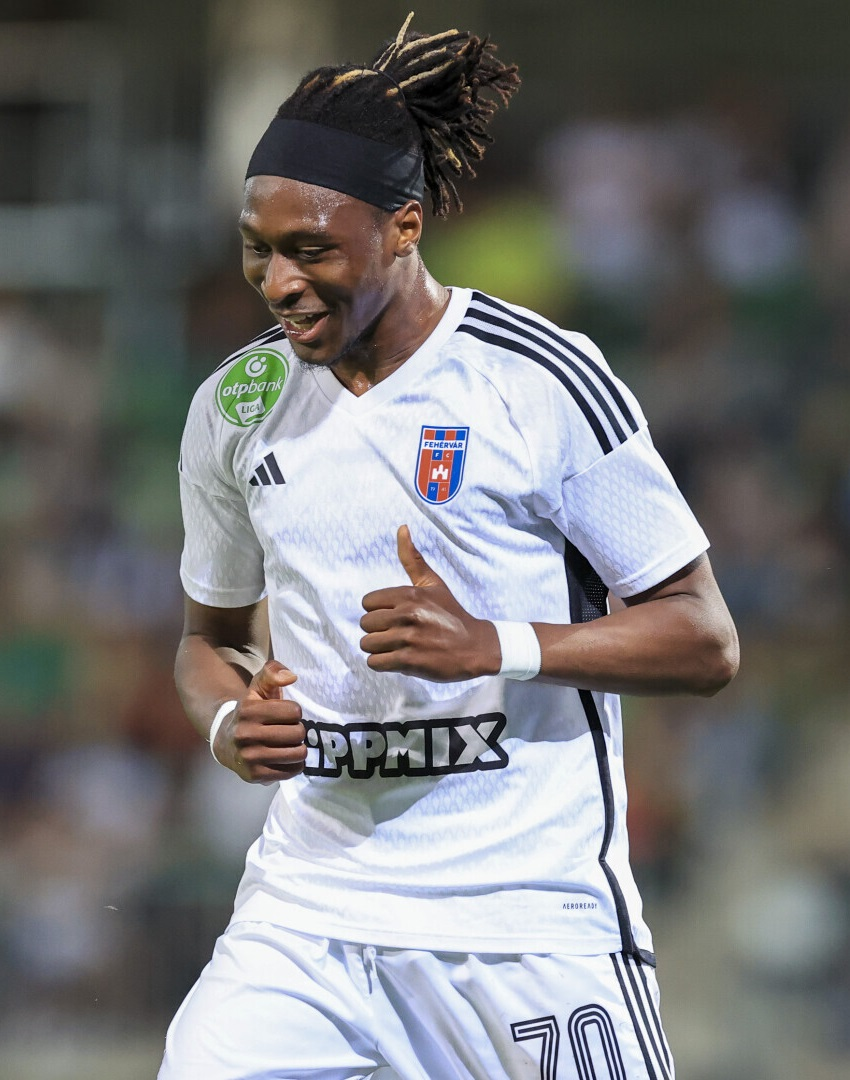
- Karamoko playing for Fehérvár in 2024

Personal information
- Date of birth: 8 June 1999 (age 27)
- Place of birth: Paris, France
- Height: 1.88 m (6 ft 2 in)
- Position: Forward

Team information
- Current team: Dinamo București
- Number: 9

Youth career
- 2011–2016: Paris FC
- 2016–2018: Strasbourg

Senior career*
Years	Team	Apps	(Gls)
2018–2019	Strasbourg B	26	(8)
2019	Strasbourg	0	(0)
2019–2020	VfL Wolfsburg II	20	(12)
2020	VfL Wolfsburg	1	(0)
2020–2022	LASK	16	(5)
2020	Juniors OÖ	6	(3)
2022–2025	Copenhagen	7	(0)
2023–2024	→ Fehérvár (loan)	23	(5)
2024–2025	→ Újpest (loan)	19	(2)
2025–	Dinamo București	37	(8)
- * Club domestic league appearances and goals as of 6 November 2026

Mamoudou Karamoko (born 8 June 1999) is a French professional footballer who plays as a forward for Liga I club Dinamo București.

== Career ==
Karamoko began playing youth football at Paris FC at the age of 12, and joined the academy of Strasbourg in December 2016. He made his professional debut for Strasbourg in a 1–0 Coupe de France win over Grenoble Foot 38 on 16 January 2019.

On 31 January 2022, Karamoko joined Danish Superliga club F.C. Copenhagen on a deal until June 2026. On 1 August 2023, he moved to Fehérvár of the Hungarian Nemzeti Bajnokság I on a one-year loan deal.

Karamoko was sent back to Hungary by Copenhagen for the 2024-25 season, loaned out to Újpest FC of the Nemzeti Bajnokság I on a one-year loan deal.

Karamoko signed a two-year deal with Romanian club Dinamo Bucureşti.

== Career statistics ==
As of 6 November 2026

Appearances and goals by club, season and competition
Club	Season	League			National cup (Note: Includes Coupe de France, Austrian Cup, Danish Cup, Magyar Kupa, Cupa României)		Europe		Other		Total	
Club	Season	Division	Apps	Goals	Apps	Goals	Apps	Goals	Apps	Goals	Apps	Goals
Strasbourg B	2017–18	Championnat National 3	7	0	—		—		—		7	0
Strasbourg B	2018–19	Championnat National 3	19	8	—		—		—		19	8
Strasbourg B	Total		26	8	—		—		—		27	9
Strasbourg	2018–19	Ligue 1	—		2	0	—		—		2	0
VfL Wolfsburg II	2019–20	Regionalliga	20	12	—		—		—		20	12
VfL Wolfsburg	2019–20	Bundesliga	1	0	—		—		—		1	0
LASK	2020–21	Austrian Bundesliga	2	1	0	0	1 (Note: Appearance in UEFA Europa League)	1	—		3	2
LASK	2021–22	Austrian Bundesliga	14	4	3	0	7 (Note: Appearances in UEFA Europa Conference League)	3	—		24	7
LASK	Total		16	5	3	0	8	4	—		27	9
Juniors OÖ	2020–21	2. Liga	6	3	—		—		—		6	3
Copenhagen	2021–22	Danish Superliga	2	0	—		—		0	0	2	0
Copenhagen	2022–23	Danish Superliga	5	0	1	0	2 (Note: Appearances in UEFA Champions League)	0	—		8	0
Copenhagen	Total		7	0	1	0	2	0	—		10	0
Fehérvár (loan)	2023–24	Nemzeti Bajnokság I	23	5	1	0	—		—		24	5
Újpest (loan)	2024–25	Nemzeti Bajnokság I	19	2	4	0	—		—		23	2
Dinamo București	2025–26	Liga I	26	6	1	0	—		1 (Note: Appearances in Liga I European play-offs)	1	28	7
Dinamo București	2026–27	Liga I	12	2	0	0	—		—		12	2
Dinamo București	Total		37	8	1	0	—		1	1	39	9
Career total			149	40	12	0	10	4	1	1	172	45

== Personal life ==
Born in France, Karamoko is of Ivorian descent.

== Honours ==
LASK

- Austrian Cup runner-up: 2020–21

Copenhagen

- Danish Superliga: 2021–22, 2022–23
- Danish Cup: 2022–23
