= João Nunes (footballer, born 1995) =

Portuguese footballer

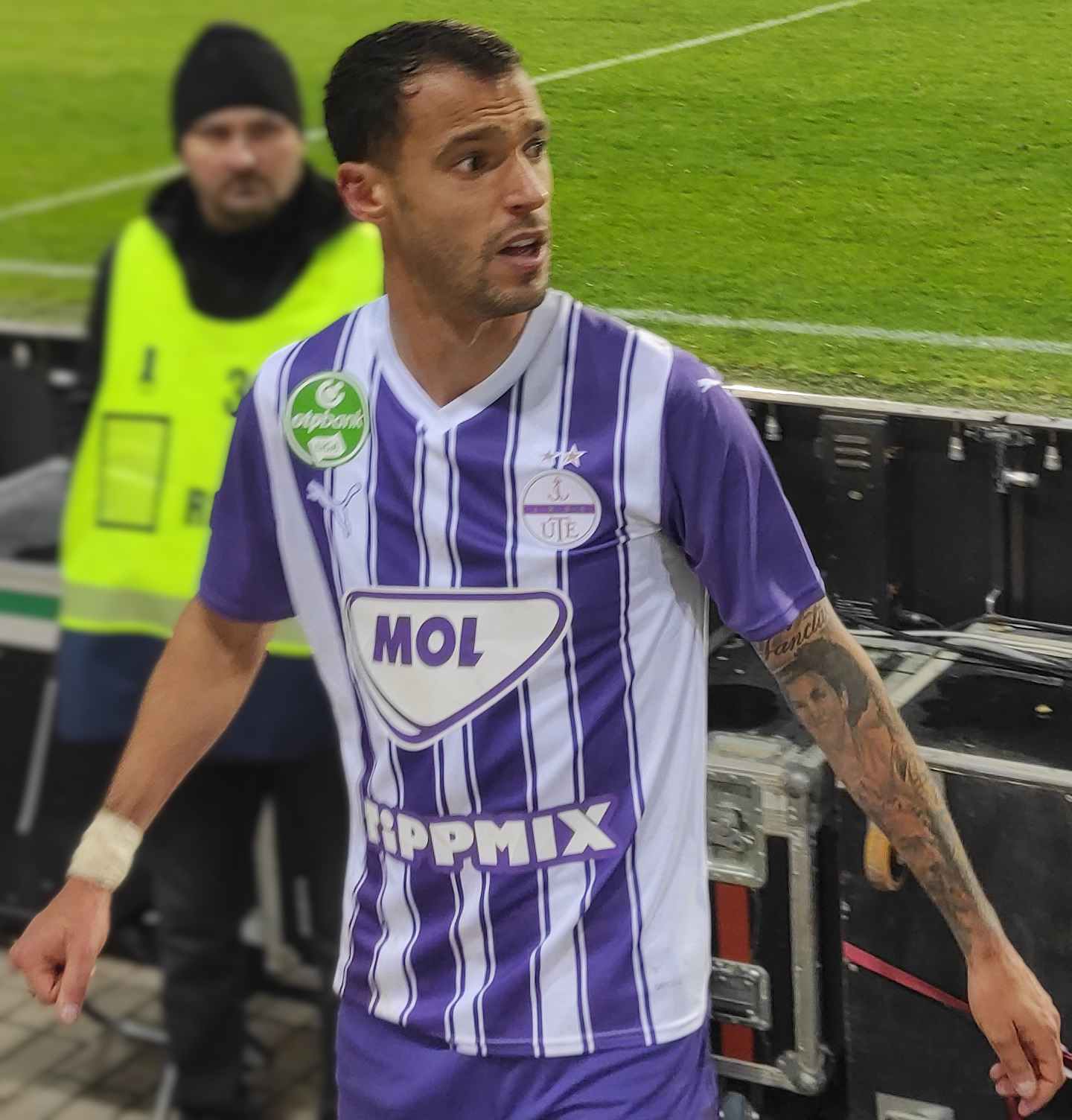
- Nunes with Újpest in 2024

Personal information
- Full name: João Aniceto Grandela Nunes
- Date of birth: 19 November 1995 (age 30)
- Place of birth: Setúbal, Portugal
- Height: 1.86 m (6 ft 1 in)
- Position: Centre-back

Team information
- Current team: Újpest
- Number: 30

Youth career
- 2003–2005: GDR 1º Maio
- 2005–2014: Benfica

Senior career*
Years	Team	Apps	(Gls)
2013–2016	Benfica B	52	(1)
2016–2019	Lechia Gdańsk	76	(0)
2019–2020	Panathinaikos	11	(0)
2020–2022	Puskás Akadémia	45	(5)
2022–2024	Casa Pia	45	(2)
2024–	Újpest	60	(2)

International career
2011	Portugal U16	11	(0)
2012	Portugal U17	9	(1)
2013	Portugal U18	7	(3)
2013–2014	Portugal U19	17	(0)
2014–2015	Portugal U20	9	(0)
Medal record
Men's football
Representing Portugal
UEFA European Under-19 Championship
Runner-up	2014 Hungary
- * Club domestic league appearances and goals as of 18:08, 1 July 2026 (UTC)

João Aniceto Grandela Nunes (born 19 November 1995) is a Portuguese professional footballer who plays as a central defender for Nemzeti Bajnokság I club Újpest.

== Club career ==
=== Benfica ===
Born in Setúbal, Nunes began his career with S.L. Benfica, joining the club's youth academy at the age of 9. On 6 January 2013, while still a junior, he played his first Segunda Liga match with the reserves, coming on as a late substitute in a 1–1 away draw against C.D. Santa Clara.

On 27 March 2014, Nunes renewed his contract until 2019. He scored his first goal in the second division on 20 September 2015, in a 1–0 home win over Gil Vicente FC.

=== Lechia Gdańsk ===
On 29 August 2016, Nunes signed a three-year deal with Lechia Gdańsk of the Polish Ekstraklasa. He made his league debut on 9 September, playing the entire 1–0 victory at KS Cracovia alongside his compatriots Flávio Paixão and Marco Paixão.

On 2 May 2019, Nunes also started in the Polish Cup final, as the club won the tournament for the second time in its history after beating Jagiellonia Białystok.

=== Panathinaikos ===
On 23 July 2019, free agent Nunes joined Panathinaikos F.C. of the Super League Greece on a three-year contract. During his only season, he made 13 competitive appearances.

=== Puskás Akadémia and Casa Pia ===
Nunes moved to Hungarian Nemzeti Bajnokság I side Puskás Akadémia FC on 1 July 2020. He returned to his homeland in summer 2022 after six years abroad, agreeing to a three-year deal at Casa Pia AC. He made his Primeira Liga debut on 7 August, when he featured the entire 0–0 draw away to Santa Clara.

On 13 November 2022, Nunes scored his first goal in the Portuguese top flight, opening an eventual 1–2 home loss against G.D. Chaves.

=== Later career ===
Nunes went back to the Hungarian top tier on 8 July 2024, on a contract at Újpest FC.

== International career ==
Nunes represented Portugal at the 2014 UEFA European Under-19 Championship. In 2015, he appeared in all the games as vice-captain as the under-20 team were knocked out in the quarter-finals of the FIFA World Cup by eventual finalists Brazil.

== Career statistics ==
As of 9 May 2021

Appearances and goals by club, season and competition
Club	Season	League			National cup (Note: Includes Polish Cup, Greek Cup, Magyar Kupa)		Continental		Other		Total	
Club	Season	Division	Apps	Goals	Apps	Goals	Apps	Goals	Apps	Goals	Apps	Goals
Lechia Gdańsk	2016–17	Ekstraklasa	23	0	0	0	—		—		23	0
Lechia Gdańsk	2017–18	Ekstraklasa	30	0	1	0	—		—		31	0
Lechia Gdańsk	2018–19	Ekstraklasa	23	0	5	0	—		—		28	0
Lechia Gdańsk	Total		76	0	6	0	—		—		82	0
Panathinaikos	2019–20	Super League Greece	11	0	2	0	—		—		13	0
Puskás Akadémia	2020–21	Nemzeti Bajnokság I	22	2	1	1	—		—		23	3
Career total			109	2	9	1	0	0	0	0	118	3

== Honours ==
Benfica Youth

- UEFA Youth League runner-up: 2013–14

Lechia Gdańsk

- Polish Cup: 2018–19

Individual

- UEFA European Under-19 Championship Team of the Tournament: 2014
