= Tom Lacoux =

French footballer (born 2002)

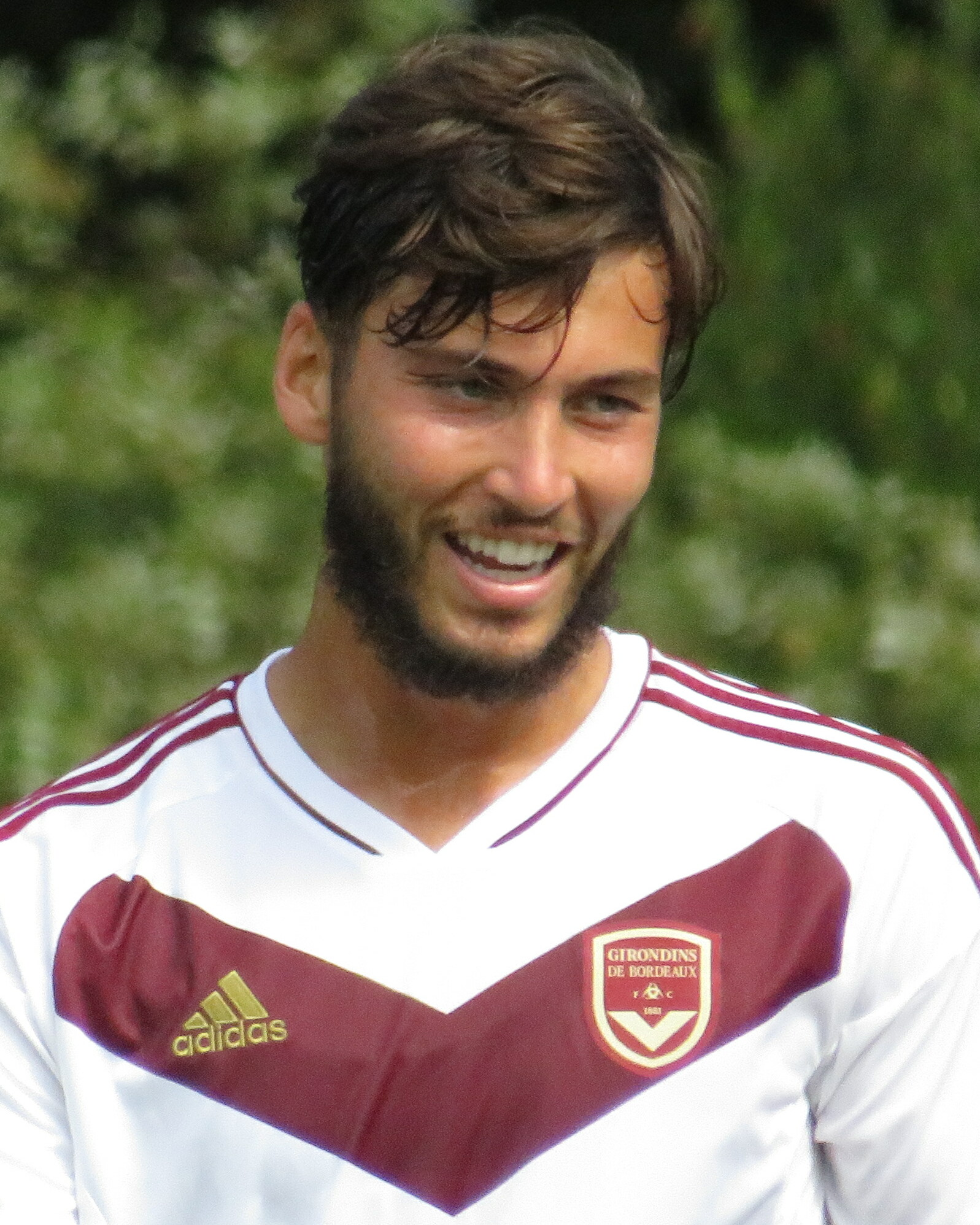

Personal information
- Full name: Tom Jacques Daniel Lacoux
- Date of birth: 25 January 2002 (age 24)
- Place of birth: Bordeaux, France
- Height: 1.82 m (6 ft 0 in)
- Position: Defensive midfielder

Team information
- Current team: Gorica
- Number: 6

Youth career
- 2016–2021: Bordeaux

Senior career*
| Years | Team | Apps | (Gls) |
| 2019–2021 | Bordeaux B | 10 | (0) |
| 2020–2024 | Bordeaux | 59 | (0) |
| 2023–2024 | → Famalicão (loan) | 9 | (0) |
| 2024-2026 | Újpest | 48 | (3) |
| 2024 | Újpest II | 1 | (0) |
| 2026- | Gorica | 8 | (0) |
- * Club domestic league appearances and goals as of 1 November 2026

Tom Lacoux (born 25 January 2002) is a French professional footballer who plays as a midfielder for the Croatian club Gorica.

== Career ==
On 5 July 2020, Lacoux signed his first professional contract with Bordeaux. He made his professional debut with Bordeaux in a 3–1 Ligue 1 loss to Reims on 23 December 2020.

On 8 August 2023, Portuguese Primeira Liga side Famalicão announced the signing of Lacoux on a season-long loan.

On 19 August 2024, Lacoux signed for Hungarian club Ujpest on a free transfer.

In late August 2026, Lacoux joined HNK Gorica in Croatia.
