= Barnabás Bese =

Hungarian footballer (born 1994)

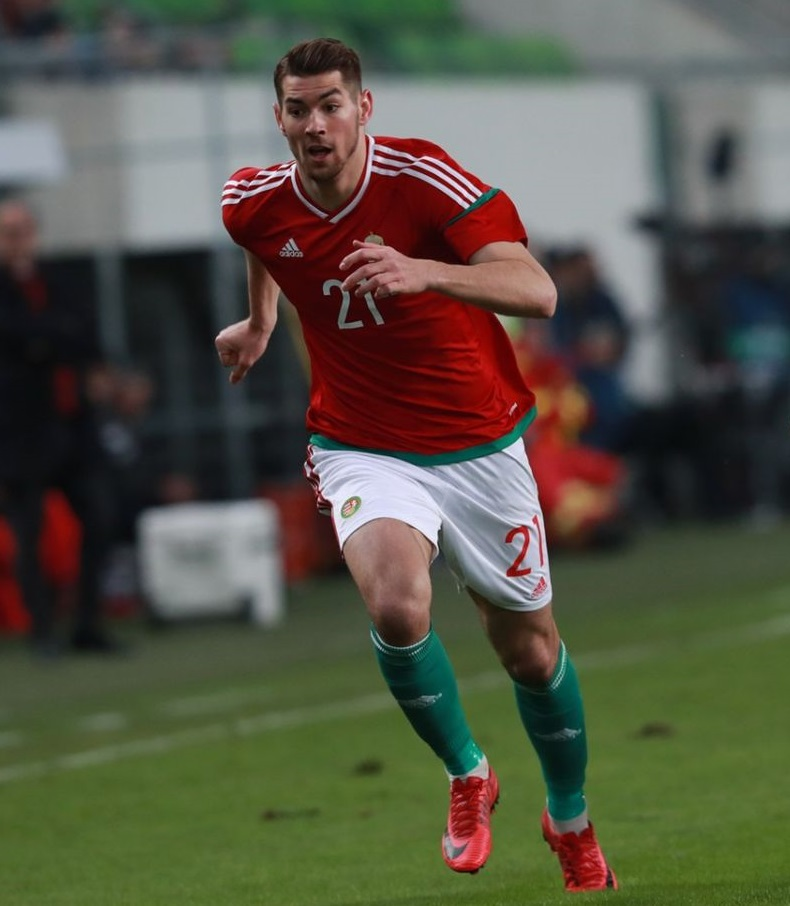
- Bese with Hungary in 2018

Personal information
- Date of birth: 6 May 1994 (age 32)
- Place of birth: Budapest, Hungary
- Height: 1.88 m (6 ft 2 in)
- Position: Right back

Team information
- Current team: Újpest
- Number: 33

Youth career
- 2003–2005: Csep-Gól FC.
- 2005–2008: Ferencváros
- 2008–2011: MTK Budapest

Senior career*
Years	Team	Apps	(Gls)
2011–2016	MTK Budapest	96	(7)
2016–2020	Le Havre	116	(5)
2020–2021	OH Leuven	17	(0)
2022–2024	Fehérvár	55	(0)
2024–	Újpest	35	(4)

International career^{‡}
2010–2011	Hungary U-17	1	(0)
2011–2012	Hungary U-18	4	(1)
2012–2013	Hungary U-19	2	(0)
2014	Hungary U-20	1	(0)
2013–2016	Hungary U-21	11	(2)
2016–2020	Hungary	23	(0)
- * Club domestic league appearances and goals as of 30 May 2026 ‡ National team caps and goals as of 8 May 2023

Barnabás Bese (Hungarian pronunciation: [ˈbɒrnɒbaːʃ ˈbɛʃɛ], born 6 May 1994) is a Hungarian professional footballer who plays as a right back for Újpest in the Nemzeti Bajnokság I.

== Club career ==
=== MTK Budapest ===
On 26 May 2012, Bese played his first match in the MTK Budapest against Szigetszentmiklósi TK on the 29th match day of the 2011–12 Nemzeti Bajnokság II season.

On 23 November 2012, Bese played his first match in the first league (Nemzeti Bajnokság I) against Kaposvár on the 16th match day of the 2012–13 Nemzeti Bajnokság I season.

He scored his first goal on 3 August 2013 in the Nemzeti Bajnokság I against Diósgyőri VTK on the 2nd match day of the 2013–14 Nemzeti Bajnokság I season. His goal was the equalizer in a 2–2 draw at the DVTK Stadion in Miskolc, Hungary.

=== Le Havre ===
On 19 August 2016, Bese signed for Ligue 2 club Le Havre AC on a four-year contract.

On 27 August 2016, Bese played his first match in Le Havre against Red Star F.C. on the first match day of the 2016–17 Ligue 2 season.

== International career ==
Bese was selected for the Hungary national team's Euro 2016 squad.

He played in the last group match in a 3–3 draw against Portugal at the Parc Olympique Lyonnais, Lyon on 22 June 2016.

== Career statistics ==
=== Club ===
As of matches played 15 May 2022

Appearances and goals by club, season and competition
Club	Season	League			Cup		League Cup		Europe		Total	
Club	Season	Division	Apps	Goals	Apps	Goals	Apps	Goals	Apps	Goals	Apps	Goals
MTK Budapest	2011–12	Nemzeti Bajnokság II	2	0	0	0	1	0	0	0	3	0
MTK Budapest	2012–13	Nemzeti Bajnokság I	12	0	0	0	1	0	0	0	13	0
MTK Budapest	2013–14	Nemzeti Bajnokság I	21	4	4	0	2	0	0	0	27	4
MTK Budapest	2014–15	Nemzeti Bajnokság I	27	2	2	1	5	0	0	0	22	2
MTK Budapest	2015–16	Nemzeti Bajnokság I	33	1	1	0	0	0	2	0	36	1
MTK Budapest	2016–17	Nemzeti Bajnokság I	1	0	0	0	0	0	3	1	4	1
MTK Budapest	Total		84	6	6	1	9	0	5	1	104	8
Le Havre	2016–17	Ligue 2	28	1	2	0	1	0	–		31	1
Le Havre	2017–18	Ligue 2	31	1	0	0	1	0	–		32	1
Le Havre	2018–19	Ligue 2	32	1	3	0	2	0	–		37	1
Le Havre	2019–20	Ligue 2	25	2	0	0	0	0	–		25	2
Le Havre	Total		116	5	5	0	4	0	0	0	125	5
OH Leuven	2020–21	First Division A	12	0	1	0	–		–		13	0
OH Leuven	2021–22	First Division A	5	0	0	0	–		–		5	0
OH Leuven	Total		17	0	1	0	0	0	0	0	18	0
Fehérvár	2021–22	Nemzeti Bajnokság I	9	0	1	0	–		0	0	10	0
Fehérvár	Total		9	0	1	0	0	0	0	0	10	0
Career total			226	11	13	1	13	0	5	1	257	13

=== International ===
As of 7 September 2020.

Appearances and goals by national team and year
National team	Year	Apps	Goals
Hungary	2016	4	0
Hungary	2017	7	0
Hungary	2018	4	0
Hungary	2019	5	0
Hungary	2020	1	0
Total		21	0
