= Fran Brodić =

Croatian footballer

Personal information
- Date of birth: 8 January 1997 (age 29)
- Place of birth: Zagreb, Croatia
- Height: 1.80 m (5 ft 11 in)
- Position: Forward

Team information
- Current team: Újpest FC
- Number: 9

Youth career
- 2005: Kustošija
- 2005–2011: Zagreb
- 2011–2013: Dinamo Zagreb

Senior career*
Years	Team	Apps	(Gls)
2013–2014	Dinamo Zagreb	5	(0)
2014–2018	Club Brugge	0	(0)
2015–2016	→ Royal Antwerp (loan)	1	(0)
2017	→ Roeselare (loan)	3	(0)
2018–2019	Catania	24	(2)
2019–2020	Reggiana	11	(0)
2020–2021	Kustošija	24	(14)
2021–2022	Gorica	9	(1)
2022	→ Varaždin (loan)	14	(5)
2022–2023	Varaždin	40	(18)
2023–2024	Dinamo Zagreb	12	(6)
2023–2024	→ Varaždin (loan)	12	(7)
2024–	Újpest	50	(10)

International career
2012	Croatia U16	9	(7)
2012–2013	Croatia U17	22	(5)
2013–2014	Croatia U18	4	(1)
2014–2016	Croatia U19	10	(3)
2017	Croatia U21	1	(0)
- * Club domestic league appearances and goals as of 30 May 2026

Fran Brodić (born 8 January 1997) is a Croatian professional footballer who plays as a forward for Nemzeti Bajnokság I club Újpest FC. Brodić represented Croatia at under-21 level.

== Club career ==
Brodić made his first-team debut for Dinamo Zagreb on 14 April 2013, as an 85th-minute substitute in a 2–0 win at home to Inter Zaprešić in the Prva HNL. At 16 years 3 months and 6 days, he became Dinamo's youngest ever debutant.

On 2 September 2019, his contract with Catania was dissolved by mutual consent.

On 11 October 2019 he signed with Serie C club Reggiana until the end of the 2019–20 season, with an extension option for an additional year.

In October 2020 Brodić rejoined, after 15 years, his first club NK Kustošija to play in the Croatian Second Football League.

== Career statistics ==
As of match played 17 December 2017

Appearances and goals by club, season and competition
Club	Season	League			National Cup		Other		Total	
Club	Season	Division	Apps	Goals	Apps	Goals	Apps	Goals	Apps	Goals
Dinamo Zagreb	2012–13	Prva HNL	1	0	0	0	0	0	1	0
Dinamo Zagreb	2013–14	Prva HNL	4	0	2	1	0	0	6	1
Dinamo Zagreb	Total		5	0	2	1	0	0	7	1
Club Brugge	2014–15	Pro League	0	0	0	0	0	0	0	0
Club Brugge	2015–16	Pro League	0	0	0	0	0	0	0	0
Club Brugge	2016–17	Pro League	0	0	0	0	0	0	0	0
Club Brugge	2017–18	Pro League	0	0	0	0	0	0	0	0
Club Brugge	Total		0	0	0	0	0	0	0	0
Royal Antwerp (loan)	2015–16	Second Division	1	0	0	0	—		1	0
KSV Roeselare (loan)	2017–18	First Division B	3	0	2	1	—		5	1
Career total			9	0	4	2	0	0	13	2
