= André Duarte =

Portuguese footballer

Personal information
- Full name: André Lourenço Duarte
- Date of birth: 12 September 1997 (age 29)
- Place of birth: Sacavém, Portugal
- Height: 1.95 m (6 ft 5 in)
- Position: Centre back

Team information
- Current team: FCSB
- Number: 3

Youth career
- 2006–2009: Sacavenense
- 2009–2010: Sporting CP
- 2010–2011: Foot 21
- 2011–2013: Águias de Camarate
- 2013–2014: A.D.C.E.O
- 2014–2015: Loures
- 2015–2016: Sacavenense

Senior career*
Years	Team	Apps	(Gls)
2016–2018	Sacavenense	25	(0)
2018	Estoril U23	4	(0)
2018–2020	Alverca	30	(1)
2020	Praiense	10	(0)
2021–2022	Estrela Amadora	40	(2)
2022–2023	FC U Craiova	39	(0)
2023–2024	Reggiana	0	(0)
2023–2024	→ Osijek (loan)	30	(0)
2024	Osijek	1	(0)
2024–2025	Újpest	39	(1)
2026–	FCSB	26	(0)
- * Club domestic league appearances and goals as of 22 November 2026

André Lourenço Duarte (born 12 September 1997) is a Portuguese professional footballer who plays as a centre back for Liga I club FCSB.

== Career statistics ==
As of 22 November 2026

Appearances and goals by club, season and competition
Club	Season	League			National cup (Note: Includes Taça de Portugal, Cupa României, Croatian Cup, Magyar Kupa)		Europe		Other		Total	
Club	Season	Division	Apps	Goals	Apps	Goals	Apps	Goals	Apps	Goals	Apps	Goals
Sacavenense	2016–17	Campeonato de Portugal	3	0	0	0	—		—		2	0
Sacavenense	2017–18	Campeonato de Portugal	22	0	0	0	—		—		22	0
Sacavenense	Total		25	0	0	0	—		—		15	0
Estoril U23	2018–19	Liga Revelação	4	0	—		—		—		4	0
Alverca	2018–19	Campeonato de Portugal	18	0	—		—		—		18	0
Alverca	2019–20	Campeonato de Portugal	12	1	3	0	—		—		15	1
Alverca	Total		30	1	3	0	—		—		33	1
Praiense	2020–21	Campeonato de Portugal	10	0	1	0	—		—		11	0
Estrela Amadora	2020–21	Campeonato de Portugal	14	0	—		—		1 (Note: Appearance in Campeonato de Portugal final)	0	15	0
Estrela Amadora	2021–22	Liga Portugal 2	26	2	3	0	—		1 (Note: Appearances in Taça da Liga)	0	30	1
Estrela Amadora	Total		40	2	3	0	—		1	0	44	2
FC U Craiova	2022–23	Liga I	39	0	4	0	—		2 (Note: Appearances in Liga I European play-offs)	0	45	0
Reggiana	2023–24	Serie B	0	0	0	0	—		—		0	0
Osijek (loan)	2023–24	HNL	30	0	2	0	—		—		32	0
Osijek	2024–25	HNL	1	0	—		3 (Note: Appearances in UEFA Conference League)	0	—		4	1
Osijek	Total		31	0	2	0	3	0	—		36	0
Újpest	2024–25	Nemzeti Bajnokság I	29	1	4	0	—		—		33	1
Újpest	2025–26	Nemzeti Bajnokság I	10	0	1	0	—		—		11	1
Újpest	Total		39	1	5	0	—		—		44	1
FCSB	2025–26	Liga I	13	0	1	0	0	0	1	0	15	0
FCSB	2026–27	Liga I	13	0	1	0	2	0	—		16	0
FCSB	Total		26	0	2	0	2	0	1	0	31	0
Career total			244	4	20	0	5	0	5	0	274	4

== Honours ==
Individual

- FC U Craiova Player of the Year: 2022–23
