= Nimród Baranyai =

Hungarian footballer

Personal information
- Date of birth: 6 August 2003 (age 23)
- Place of birth: Debrecen, Hungary
- Height: 1.80 m (5 ft 11 in)
- Position: Right back

Team information
- Current team: Kazincbarcikai SC
- Number: 25

Youth career
- 2015–2021: Debrecen

Senior career*
Years	Team	Apps	(Gls)
2021–2024	Debrecen	40	(1)
2021–2024	→ Debrecen II	16	(1)
2023	→ Mezőkövesd (loan)	3	(0)
2024–	Újpest	4	(0)
2025–	→ Kazincbarcika (loan)	40	(3)
- * Club domestic league appearances and goals as of 30 May 2026

Nimród Baranyai (born 6 August 2003) is a Hungarian professional footballer who plays for Újpest on loan to Nemzeti Bajnokság I club Kazincbarcikai SC.

== Career ==
On 8 February 2023, Baranyai joined Mezőkövesd on loan.

== Career statistics ==
As of 15 May 2022

Appearances and goals by club, season and competition
Club	Season	League			Cup		Continental		Other		Total	
Club	Season	Division	Apps	Goals	Apps	Goals	Apps	Goals	Apps	Goals	Apps	Goals
Debrecen II	2021–22	Nemzeti Bajnokság III	16	1	—		—		—		16	1
Debrecen II	Total		16	1	0	0	0	0	0	0	16	1
Debrecen	2021–22	Nemzeti Bajnokság I	14	0	0	0	—		—		14	0
Debrecen	Total		14	0	0	0	0	0	0	0	14	0
Career total			30	1	0	0	0	0	0	0	30	1
