= 2025–26 Újpest FC season =

Újpest
2025–26 season
- Manager: Zoltán Szélesi (From 30 December 2025; Boldizsár Bodor ^{i} (From 9 November 2025 until 30 December 2025; Damir Krznar (From 5 May 2025 until 9 November 2025)
- Stadium: Szusza Ferenc Stadion
- Nemzeti Bajnokság I: 7th
- Magyar Kupa: Round of 64
- Top goalscorer: League: Matko (17); All: Matko (17)
- Highest home attendance: 10,930 (v Ferencváros, Nemzeti Bajnokság, R32, 3 May 2025)
- Lowest home attendance: 3,057 (v Zalaegerszeg, Nemzeti Bajnokság, R16, 7 December 2025)
- Average home league attendance: 6,089
- Biggest win: 3 goals, (4–1) v Zalaegerszeg (A), Nemzeti Bajnokság, R5, 23 August 2025
- Biggest defeat: 5 goals, (0–5) v Ferencváros (H); Nemzeti Bajnokság, R32, 3 May 2025
- All statistics correct as of 16 May 2026.

The 2025–26 season is Újpest Football Club's 145nd competitive season, 134rd consecutive season in the Nemzeti Bajnokság I and 133nd year in existence as a football club. In addition to the domestic league, Újpest participated in this season's editions of the Magyar Kupa.

== Kits ==
Supplier: Puma / Sponsor: MOL / Tippmix

Home	Home alt.	Away	Third

- Home: The club revealed their new home and away kit for the 2025–26 season on 21 July 2025. The kit uses Újpest's traditional colours of purple and white. The home jersey is the traditional purple, featuring 5 vertical stripes on a white background, and a purple collar. The look is completed with white shorts with thick purple stripes and white socks.
- Away: The away shirt is a traditional purple with 4 neon purple vertical stripes, decorated with a double thin white border at the V-neck and shoulders, complemented by purple shorts and socks.
- Third: The club revealed their new third kit for the 2025–26 season on 7 July 2025. The third is a jersey with purple crisscross graphic elements on a white background, with purple shorts and white socks.

Goalkeeper^{1}	Goalkeeper^{2}	Goalkeeper^{3}	Goalkeeper^{4}

== First team squad ==
As of 1 February 2026

Note: Flags indicate national team as defined under FIFA eligibility rules; some limited exceptions apply. Players may hold more than one non-FIFA nationality.

No.	Pos.	Nation	Player
1	GK	ITA	Riccardo Piscitelli
2	DF	HUN	Gergő Bodnár
4	DF	HUN	Csanád Fehér
5	DF	GEO	Davit Kobouri
6	MF	POL	Damian Rasak
7	FW	GEO	Giorgi Beridze
8	MF	MKD	Arijan Ademi
9	FW	CRO	Fran Brodić
10	MF	GER	Arne Maier
11	FW	HUN	Krisztofer Horváth
15	MF	POR	Tiago Gonçalves
17	FW	SLO	Aljoša Matko
18	MF	FRA	Tom Lacoux
19	FW	SLO	Nejc Gradišar (on loan from Al Ahly)
21	MF	HUN	Pál Helmich

No.	Pos.	Nation	Player
22	DF	HUN	Krisztián Tamás
23	GK	HUN	Dávid Banai (captain)
27	FW	HUN	Ábel Krajcsovics
30	DF	POR	João Nunes
31	DF	HUN	Dávid Dombó (on loan from Kazincbarcika)
33	DF	HUN	Barnabás Bese
34	FW	SLO	Milan Tučić
39	FW	SUR	Gleofilo Vlijter
44	DF	HUN	Bence Gergényi
45	FW	POR	Iuri Medeiros
46	DF	HUN	Milán Mándi Naruki
55	DF	HUN	Attila Fiola (vice-captain)
74	DF	HUN	Noah Fenyő
88	MF	SRB	Matija Ljujić
94	DF	CZE	Patrizio Stronati

== Transfers ==
=== Summer ===
In
Date	No.	Pos.	Nat.	Player	Moving from	Fee	Ref.
5 June 2025	99	GK	Hungary	Bence Juhász	Mezőkövesd (NB II)	Undisclosed	
19 June 2025	17	FW	Slovenia	Aljoša Matko	Celje	Undisclosed	
20 June 2025	TBD	MF	North Macedonia	Arijan Ademi	Dinamo Zagreb	Free agent	
4 July 2025	45	FW	Portugal	Iuri Medeiros	Hapoel Be'er Sheva	Free agent	
5 July 2025	39	FW	Suriname	Gleofilo Vlijter	OFK Beograd	Undisclosed	
16 July 2025	24	DF	Portugal	Tiago Gonçalves	Hermannstadt	Undisclosed	

On loan from
Date	No.	Pos.	Nat.	Player	Moving from	Until	Ref.
1 September 2025	31	GK	Hungary	Dávid Dombó	Kazincbarcika	30 June 2026	

Return from loan
Date	No.	Pos.	Nat.	Player	Moving from	Ref.
16 June 2025	70	FW	France	Mamoudou Karamoko	Copenhagen	

Out
Date	No.	Pos.	Nat.	Player	Moving to	Fee	Ref.
16 June 2025	47	FW	Hungary	Márk Mucsányi	Diósgyőr	Free agent	
16 June 2025	1	GK	Hungary	Gellért Genzler	TBD	End of contract	
16 June 2025		DF	Nigeria	Chukwujekwu Ajanah-Chinedu	TBD	End of contract	
23 June 2025	29	MF	Nigeria	Vincent Onovo	TBD	End of contract	
24 June 2025	7	MF	Hungary	Krisztián Simon	—	Retired	
8 August 2025		MF	Serbia	Ognjen Radošević	Borac Banja Luka	Mutual agreement	
3 December 2025	3	DF	Portugal	André Duarte	TBD	Sacked	

Out on loan
Date	No.	Pos.	Nat.	Player	Moving to	Loan date	Ref.
10 July 2025	8	MF	Hungary	Márk Dékei	Videoton (Nemzeti Bajnokság II)	30 June 2026	
22 July 2025		GK	Hungary	Olivér Svékus	Videoton (Nemzeti Bajnokság II)	30 June 2026	
25 July 2025	25	DF	Hungary	Nimród Baranyai	Kazincbarcika	30 June 2026	
26 July 2025	77	MF	Hungary	Adrián Dénes	BVSC (Nemzeti Bajnokság II)	30 June 2026	
26 July 2025		DF	Hungary	Dominik Kovács	BVSC (Nemzeti Bajnokság II)	30 June 2026	
26 July 2025		FW	Hungary	Ákos Tóth	Ajka (Nemzeti Bajnokság II)	30 June 2026	
26 July 2025		MF	Hungary	György Balázs Varga	Budafoki MTE (Nemzeti Bajnokság II)	30 June 2026	
30 July 2025	21	DF	Hungary	Levente Babós	Diósgyőr	30 June 2026	
30 July 2025	88	MF	Hungary	Miron Mucsányi	Diósgyőr	30 June 2026	
1 September 2025	99	GK	Hungary	Bence Juhász	Kazincbarcika	30 June 2026	

=== Winter ===
Out
Date	No.	Pos.	Nat.	Player	Moving to	Fee	Ref.
24 December 2025	32	FW	Romania	George Ganea	TBD	Mutual agreement	

=== Contract renewals ===
Date	No.	Pos.	Nat.	Player	Extension to	Ref.
16 June 2025	55	DF	Hungary	Attila Fiola	30 June 2026	
24 June 2025	23	GK	Hungary	Dávid Banai	N/A	
24 June 2025	3	DF	Portugal	André Duarte	30 June 2028	

=== Managerial changes ===
Outgoing manager	Manner of departure	Date of vacancy	Position in table	Incoming manager	Date of appointment	Ref.
(Croatia) Damir Krznar	Sacked	9 November 2025	9th	(Hungary) Boldizsár Bodor (interim)	9 November 2025	
(Hungary) Boldizsár Bodor (interim)	Contracts expire	30 December 2025	8th	(Hungary) Zoltán Szélesi	30 December 2025	

== Friendlies ==
Win Draw Loss Fixtures

=== Pre-season ===
Újpest started the preparation for the 2025/26 season at 16 June 2025.

28 June 2025 Friendly	Újpest	2–2	(Slovakia) Komárno (Slovak I)	Budapest
	Tajti 25'; Sarkadi 52'	Report	Bayemi 9'; N. Tamás 38'	Stadium: Tábor utca

4 July 2025 Friendly	Újpest	1–0	(Slovakia) Košice (Slovak I)	Budapest
	Beridze 10'	Report		Stadium: Tábor utca
Note: • Újpest 1st half: Piscitelli — Mándi-Naruki, Nunes, Duarte, Gergényi — Lacoux, Rasak — Ganea, Ljujić, Beridze — Tučić • Újpest 2nd half: Banai — Bese, Babós, Fiola, Kobouri — Mi. Mucsányi, Ademi (Mándi-Naruki (substituted on) 60') — Matko, Dénes, K. Horváth (Ljujić (substituted on) 77') — Brodić • Manager: Krznar

Summer training camp in Bled, Slovenia, from 6 July to 18 July 2025:

9 July 2025 Friendly	Dinamo Zagreb (Croatian I) (Croatia)	4–2	Újpest	Radomlje, Slovenia
17:30 CEST (UTC+02:00)	Vidović 57'; Mudražija 74', 81'; Horvat 108'	Report	Beridze 29'; Matko 37'
Note: 2x60 minutes playing time • Újpest for 61st min: Juhász — Fiola, Kobouri, Duarte — Gergényi — Lacoux, Ljujić — Beridze, K. Horváth, Matko — Tučić • Újpest from 61st min: Banai — Fiola (Kobouri (substituted on) 96'), Babós, Nunes — Dénes — Lacoux (Mi. Mucsányi (substituted on) 82'), Rasak — Ganea, Bese, Matko (Medeiros (substituted on) 94') — Tučić (Tajti (substituted on) 82') • Manager: Krznar

13 July 2025 Friendly	Kryvbas (Ukrainian I) (Ukraine)	0–0	Újpest	Radomlje, Slovenia
17:00 CEST (UTC+02:00)		Report
Note: • Újpest: Piscitelli (Juhász (substituted on) 59') — Bese (Babós (substituted on) 78'), Kobouri, Duarte, Gergényi — Rasak (Ademi (substituted on) 46'), K. Horváth (Mi. Mucsányi (substituted on) 78'), Fiola (Lacoux (substituted on) 46') — Matko (Tučić (substituted on) 63'), Brodić (Medeiros (substituted on) 46'), Ganea (Vlijter (substituted on) 32' (substituted off) 78' (Ganea (substituted on) 78')) • Manager: Krznar

17 July 2025 Friendly	Osijek (Croatian I) (Croatia)	0–1	Újpest	Radomlje, Slovenia
17:30 CEST (UTC+02:00)		Report	Matko 82'
Note: • Újpest: Piscitelli — Bese (Fiola (substituted on) 46'), Nunes (Kobouri (substituted on) 46'), Duarte (Babós (substituted on) 85'), Gergényi (Dénes (substituted on) 65') — Rasak (Vlijter (substituted on) 46'), Lacoux (Mi. Mucsányi (substituted on) 85') — Matko (Ganea (substituted on) 85'), K. Horváth (Ljujić (substituted on) 65'), Medeiros (Ademi (substituted on) 65') — Brodić (Tučić (substituted on) 65') • On the bench: Banai (GK), Juhász (GK) • Manager: Krznar

=== Mid-season ===
4 September 2025 Friendly	Újpest	2–1	Budapest Honvéd (NB II)	Budapest
10:30	Gergényi 11'; K. Tamás 50'	Report	Pinte 26'	Stadium: Szusza Ferenc Stadion; Attendance: 0 (behind closed doors); Referee: Gábor Iványi; Assistant referees: Gergely Becséri, Dávid Rózsa
Note: • Újpest 1st half: Dombó — Bese, Ademi, Gergényi, Duarte (Kaczvinszki (substituted on) 25') — Matko, Lacoux (Geiger (substituted on) 28'), Rasak, Tajti — Medeiros, Tučić • Újpest 2nd half: Dombó — Nunes, Bese (Gergényi (substituted on) 65'), Kaczvinszki, K. Tamás — Ademi, Geiger, Goncalves (Bese (substituted on) 69') — Ganea, Medeiros – Matko (Tajti (substituted on) 75') • Manager: Krznar

9 October 2025 Friendly	Újpest	2–3	(Slovakia) DAC (Slovak I)	Budapest
16:00	Matko 13', 16'; Ganea (yellow card) 36'; Duarte (yellow card) 44'	Report	Gagua 34' (yellow card) 44'; Redzic 42'; Galdino (yellow card) 53'; Kacharaba 66'	Stadium: Szusza Ferenc Stadion; Attendance: 0 (behind closed doors); Referee: Gábor Iványi; Assistant referees: Gergely Becséri, Dávid Rózsa
Note: • Újpest: Banai — Gonçalves (Kobouri (substituted on) 46'), Duarte (Nunes (substituted on) 58'), Kaczvinszki (Dévényi (substituted on) 77'), K. Tamás (Rasak (substituted on) 77') — Matko (Kr. Horváth (substituted on) 33'), Rasak (Ljujić (substituted on) 46'), Geiger (Palkó (substituted on) 77'), Beridze (Medeiros (substituted on) 58') — Tajti (Tučić (substituted on) 58'), Ganea (Vas (substituted on) 77') • Manager: Krznar

Winter training camp in Mezőkövesd, Hungary.

10 January 2026 Friendly	Košice (Slovak I) (Slovakia)	1–2	Újpest	Mezőkövesd
13:00 CET	Perišić 59'	Report	Ljujić 56'; B. Katona 74'
Note: • Újpest: Banai (Dombó (substituted on) 46') — G. Bodnár (Kastrati (substituted on) 46'), Nunes (Fiola (c) (substituted on) 46'), Babós, Goncalves (Gergényi (substituted on) 46') — Ljujić (Vlijter (substituted on) 64'), Rasak (Ademi (substituted on) 64'), Lacoux (Varga (substituted on) 64'), Matko (Vas (substituted on) 64'), Tučić (B. Katona (substituted on) 64'), Beridze (Krajcsovics (substituted on) (substituted on) 64'') • Manager: Szélesi

16 January 2026 Friendly	Mezőkövesd (NB II)	1–2	Újpest	Mezőkövesd
13:00 CET	Lőrinczy 26'	Report	Beridze 7'; Matko 17'
Note: • Újpest: Banai (Piscitelli (substituted on) 62') — G. Bodnár (Sarkadi (substituted on) 78'), Nunes, D. Horváth (Mező (substituted on) 78'), Gergényi (B. Simon (substituted on) 78') — Rasak (Mitrović (substituted on) 71'), Ademi (Bal. Varga (substituted on) 62'), Kr. Horváth (Geiger (substituted on) 46') — Matko (Vas (substituted on) 78'), Tučić (B. Katona (substituted on) 78'), Beridze (Krajcsovics (substituted on) 62') • Manager: Szélesi

== Competitions ==
=== Overall record ===
In italics, we indicate the Last match and the Final position achieved in competition(s) that have not yet been completed.

Competition	First match	Last match	Starting round	Final position	Record							
Competition	First match	Last match	Starting round	Final position	Pld	W	D	L	GF	GA	GD	Win %
Nemzeti Bajnokság I	25 July 2025	16 May 2026	Matchday 1	7th	33	11	7	15	48	57	−9	33.33
Magyar Kupa	14 September 2025	14 September 2025	Round of 64	Round of 64	1	0	0	1	2	3	−1	0.00
Total					34	11	7	16	50	60	−10	32.35

Last updated: 16 May 2026
Source: Soccerway

=== Nemzeti Bajnokság I ===
==== League table ====
Pos	Team	Pld	W	D	L	GF	GA	GD	Pts
5	Zalaegerszeg	33	13	9	11	49	43	+6	48
6	Puskás Akadémia	33	13	7	13	43	43	0	46
7	Újpest	33	11	7	15	48	57	−9	40
8	Kisvárda	33	11	7	15	36	49	−13	40
9	Nyíregyháza	33	10	10	13	47	57	−10	40

Source: Hungarian Football Federation (in Hungarian)
Rules for classification: 1) Points; 2) Matches won; 3) Goal difference; 4) Goals scored; 5) Head-to-head points; 6) Head-to-head goal difference; 7) Fair play ranking; 8) Drawing of lots.

==== Results summary ====
Overall								Home						Away					
Pld	W	D	L	GF	GA	GD	Pts	W	D	L	GF	GA	GD	W	D	L	GF	GA	GD
33	11	7	15	48	57	−9	40	6	4	7	25	28	−3	5	3	8	23	29	−6

Last updated: 16 May 2026.
Source: Soccerway

==== Results by round ====
A = Away; H = Home; W = Win; D = Draw; L = Loss

Round	1	2	3	4	5	6	7	8	9	10	11	12	13	14	15	16	17	18	19	20	21	22	23	24	25	26	27	28	29	30	31	32	33
Ground	H	A	H	H	A	H	A	H	A	H	A	A	H	A	A	H	A	H	A	H	A	H	H	A	H	H	A	H	A	H	A	H	A
Result	W	D	L	L	W	L	L	D	D	D	L	W	L	W	L	L	W	W	D	L	L	W	W	L	D	W	L	D	W	W	L	L	L
Position	1	4	6	7	5	7	8	8	8	8	11	8	9	9	9	10	9	8	8	8	9	8	8	8	8	8	8	8	8	7	7	7	7
Points	3	4	4	4	7	7	7	8	9	10	10	13	13	16	16	16	19	22	23	23	23	26	29	29	30	33	33	34	37	40	40	40	40
Manager	K	K	K	K	K	K	K	K	K	K	K	K	K	B	B	B	B	B	S	S	S	S	S	S	S	S	S	S	S	S	S	S	S

Updated to match(es) played on 16 May 2026. Source:
Notes:
Manager: • K Krznar • B Bodor (interim) • S Szélesi

==== Matches ====
Win Draw Loss Fixtures Postponed

The draw for the 2025/26 season was held on 16 June 2025.

25 July 2025 1	Újpest	3–1	Diósgyőr	Budapest
20:00 CEST	Kr. Horváth 3', 45+1' (yellow card) 35'; Ademi (yellow card) 58'; Matko 63'	Report	Saničanin (yellow card) 31' (red card) 65'; Kecskés (yellow card) 47'; Acolatse (yellow card) 55'; Šaponjić 55' (pen.)	Stadium: Szusza Ferenc Stadion; Attendance: 10,011; Referee: Tamás Bognár; Assistant referees: Péter Kóbor, Péter Ország
Note: • Újpest: Piscitelli — Bese, João Nunes, A. Duarte, Gergényi — Lacoux (Rasak (substituted on) 78') — Matko, Ljujić (c) (Beridze (substituted on) 78'), Ademi (Fiola (substituted on) 59'), Kr. Horváth (Medeiros (substituted on) 69') — Brodić (Vlijter (substituted on) 78') • Manager: Krznar • Player of the match: Aljoša Matko, Újpest 8.3

3 August 2025 2	Győri ETO	1–1	Újpest	Győr
20:00 CEST	Njie (yellow card) 32'; Benbouali (yellow card) 48'; Vingler (yellow card) 81'; Pyshchur 90+4'	Report	Fiola (yellow card) 1'; Ljujić (yellow card) 22'; Lacoux (red card) 40'; Ademi (yellow card) 70'; A. Duarte (yellow card) 78'; Beridze 89'	Stadium: ETO Park; Attendance: 5,410; Referee: Marcell Derdák; Assistant referees: Georgiou Theodoros, Dávid Rózsa
Note: • Újpest: Piscitelli — Fiola, A. Duarte, Kobouri, Gergényi (Gonçalves (substituted on) 46') — Ademi (Bese (substituted on) 79'), Ljujić (c) (Rasak (substituted on) 46'), Lacoux — Matko, Brodić (Vlijter (substituted on) 61'), Kr. Horváth (Beridze (substituted on) 46') • Manager: Krznar • Player of the match: Giorgi Beridze, Újpest 7.6 • Best player of Győr: Oleksandr Pyshchur 7.6

10 August 2025 3	Újpest	1–2	Paks	Budapest
20:00 CEST	Kr. Horváth (yellow card) 7'; Matko 43'; Gonçalves (yellow card) 75'	Report	Ke. Horváth 38'; Papp (yellow card) 45'; Lenzsér (yellow card) 65' (goal) 76'; Pető (yellow card) 73'; Szekszárdi (yellow card) 90'	Stadium: Szusza Ferenc Stadion; Attendance: 8,650; Referee: Balázs Berke; Assistant referees: Vencel Tóth II, Balázs Szert
Note: • Újpest: Piscitelli — Bese (c), João Nunes, A. Duarte, Gonçalves — Rasak (Ljujić (substituted on) 75'), Ademi (Fiola (substituted on) 57') — Matko, Kr. Horváth (Medeiros (substituted on) 57'), Beridze (Vlijter (substituted on) 75') — Brodić • Manager: Krznar • Player of the match: Ádám Kovácsik, Paks 8.8 • Best player of Újpest: Aljoša Matko 8.2

15 August 2025 4	Újpest	0–1	Kisvárda	Budapest
20:15 CEST	Brodić (yellow card) 65'; Ademi (yellow card) 72'; Kr. Horváth (yellow card) 90+6'	Report	Popoola (yellow card) 38'; Chlumecký (yellow card) 66'; Novothny 69'; Gyurkó (yellow card) 90+5'	Stadium: Szusza Ferenc Stadion; Attendance: 6,794; Referee: Márton Rúsz; Assistant referees: Georgiou Theodoros, Viktor Nagy
Note: • Újpest: Piscitelli — Bese (Ljujić (substituted on) 55'), João Nunes (Lacoux (substituted on) 74'), A. Duarte, Gonçalves (Tučić (substituted on) 74') — Fiola (c) — Medeiros, Ademi — Matko (Kr. Horváth (substituted on) 74'), Vlijter (Brodić (substituted on) 55'), Beridze • Manager: Krznar • Player of the match: Branimir Cipetić, Kisvárda 8.0 • Best player of Újpest: André Duarte 7.6

23 August 2025 5	Zalaegerszeg	1–4	Újpest	Zalaegerszeg
17:45 CEST	Várkonyi (yellow card) 16'; Skribek 45' (pen.); David López (yellow card) 87'	Report	Tučić 8', 50'; Medeiros 17' (pen.); Lacoux (yellow card) 48'; Matko (yellow card) 65'; Bese 77'; Ademi (yellow card) 88'	Stadium: ZTE Arena; Attendance: 4,464; Referee: Péter Antal; Assistant referees: Dávid Rózsa, Péter Ország
Note: • Újpest: Piscitelli — Kobouri, João Nunes, Lacoux (Ademi (substituted on) 60'), Gonçalves (Bese (substituted on) 74') — Fiola (c), Rasak (Vlijter (substituted on) 68'), Medeiros (Gergényi (substituted on) 74') — Matko, Tučić, Kr. Horváth (Ljujić (substituted on) 60') • Manager: Krznar • Player of the match: Milan Tučić, Újpest 8.0 • Best player of Zalaegerszeg: Alen Skribek 7.3

30 August 2025 6	Újpest	1–2	MTK	Budapest
19:30 CEST	Matko 23'; Brodić (yellow card) 76'; Medeiros (yellow card) 90+1'	Report	Kata (yellow card) 38'; Lehoczky (yellow card) 54'; Kerezsi 55'; Bognár 84'	Stadium: Szusza Ferenc Stadion; Attendance: 6,769; Referee: Bence Csonka dr. Assistant referees: Péter Garai, Balázs Szert
Note: • Újpest: Piscitelli — Fiola (c), João Nunes, Kobouri (A. Duarte (substituted on) 78'), Gonçalves — Lacoux (Ademi (substituted on) 78'), Rasak (Ljujić (substituted on) 58') — Matko (Brodić (substituted on) 72'), Medeiros, Kr. Horváth (Beridze (substituted on) 72') — Tučić • Manager: Krznar • Player of the match: Aljoša Matko, Újpest 8.2 • Best player of MTK: Ilia Beriashvili 7.9

20 September 2025 7	Kazincbarcika	2–0	Újpest	Mezőkövesd
18:00 CEST	Meshack 17' (yellow card) 23'; Sós 28'; Haroyan (yellow card) 34'; Gyollai (yellow card) 73'; Kártik (yellow card) 82'; Meskhi (yellow card) 89'	Report	A. Duarte (yellow card) 35'; Medeiros (yellow card) 42'; Kr. Horváth (yellow card) 60'; Fiola (yellow card) 70'	Stadium: Városi Stadion; Attendance: 1,395; Referee: Attila Molnár; Assistant referees: Balázs Szert, Bence Belicza
Note: • Újpest: Piscitelli — João Nunes, A. Duarte, Kobouri (Fiola (substituted on) 46'), Gonçalves (Tamás (substituted on) 61') — Lacoux (Rasak (substituted on) 64'), Ljujić (c) (Beridze (substituted on) 61') — Matko, Medeiros, Kr. Horváth — Vlijter (Tučić (substituted on) 61') • Manager: Krznar • Player of the match: Bence Sós, Kazincbarcika 8.3 • Best player of Újpest: Gleofilo Vlijter 7.0

26 September 2025 8	Újpest	2–2	Nyíregyháza	Budapest
20:00 CEST	Matko 17', 24'; João Nunes (yellow card) 56'; Fiola (yellow card) 64'	Report	L. Katona (yellow card) 9'; Do. Babunski 12'; Antonov (yellow card) 35'; Májer 42'; Evangelou (yellow card) 64'; Edomwonyi (yellow card) 69'; Toma (yellow card) 73'; B. Katona (yellow card) 90'	Stadium: Szusza Ferenc Stadion; Attendance: 4,430; Referee: Márton Rúsz; Assistant referees: Gergő Vígh-Tarsonyi, Bence Belicza
Note: • Újpest: Piscitelli — Gergényi, João Nunes, A. Duarte, Tamás (Gonçalves (substituted on) 57') — Fiola (c), Rasak (Ganea (substituted on) 90+1') — Matko, Medeiros, Beridze (Kr. Horváth (substituted on) 57') — Vlijter (Ljujić (substituted on) 77') • Manager: Krznar • Player of the match: Aljoša Matko, Újpest 8.4 • Best player of Nyíregyháza: Milán Májer 7.9

4 October 2025 9	Puskás Akadémia	0–0	Újpest	Felcsút
17:00 CEST	Okeke (yellow card) 30'	Report	João Nunes (yellow card) 39'; Geiger (yellow card) 90+3'	Stadium: Pancho Aréna; Attendance: 2,388; Referee: Tamás Bognár; Assistant referees: Balázs Buzás, Péter Kóbor
Note: • Újpest: Piscitelli — Kobouri, João Nunes, A. Duarte, Gonçalves — Ljujić (c), Rasak — Matko (Geiger (substituted on) 90+1'), Medeiros (Ganea (substituted on) 90+1'), Kr. Horváth (Beridze (substituted on) 83') — Vlijter (Tučić (substituted on) 59') • Manager: Krznar • Player of the match: Brandon Ormonde-Ottewill, Puskás Akadémia 8.4 • Best player of Újpest: André Duarte 7.9

19 October 2025 10	Újpest	1–1	Ferencváros	Budapest
18:00 CEST	Rasak (yellow card) 17'; Matko 63'; Geiger (yellow card) 87'; Ljujić (yellow card) 87'	Report	B. Varga 22'; Abu Fani (yellow card) 87'; Joseph (yellow card) 88'; Ötvös (yellow card) 90+4'; Gróf (red card) 90+6'	Stadium: Szusza Ferenc Stadion; Attendance: 10,569; Referee: Gergő Bogár; Assistant referees: Balázs Szert, Dániel Szalai
Note: • Újpest: Piscitelli — João Nunes, A. Duarte, Ademi (Geiger (substituted on) 53'), Gonçalves — Ljujić (c) (Beridze (substituted on) 90+1'), Rasak — Matko, Medeiros (Bese (substituted on) 90+1'), Kr. Horváth — Tučić (Ganea (substituted on) 82') • Manager: Krznar (yellow card) 90+5' • Player of the match: Krisztofer Horváth, Újpest 7.9 • Best player of Ferencváros: Barnabás Varga 7.5

26 October 2025 11	Debrecen	5–2	Újpest	Debrecen
15:00 CET	Bárány 8', 30'; Youga 15'; Lang (yellow card) 45'; Cibla 56'; D. Kocsis 59'	Report	Medeiros 64' (pen.); Lacoux 74' (yellow card) 74'; Gonçalves (yellow card) 89'	Stadium: Nagyerdei Stadion; Attendance: 6,647; Referee: Ferenc Karakó; Assistant referees: Balázs Szalai, Zoltán Horváth
Note: • Újpest: Piscitelli — Rasak, A. Duarte, João Nunes, Gonçalves — Ljujić (c) (Lacoux (substituted on) 61'), Ademi (Kobouri (substituted on) 61') — Matko, Medeiros (Tajti (substituted on) 74'), Kr. Horváth (Beridze (substituted on) 33') — Tučić (Ganea (substituted on) 74') • Manager: Krznar (yellow card) 85' • Player of the match: Dominik Kocsis, Debrecen 8.9 • Best player of Újpest: Krisztofer Horváth 7.8

2 November 2025 12	Diósgyőr	1–3	Újpest	Miskolc
15:30 CET	Acolatse 23' (pen.) (yellow card) 52'; Jurek (yellow card) 47'; A. Keita (yellow card) 49'	Report	Bokros 35' (o.g.); Kr. Horváth 42' (yellow card) 49'; Bese (red card) 45+8'; Medeiros (yellow card) 50'; Matko 83'	Stadium: Diósgyőri Stadion; Attendance: 5,855; Referee: Bence Csonka dr. Assistant referees: Georgiou Theodoros, József Aradi
Note: • Újpest: Banai (c) — Bese, João Nunes, Kaczvinszki, Gonçalves — Rasak (Ganea (substituted on) 90+3'), Medeiros (Ademi (substituted on) 88'), Lacoux — Matko (Tučić (substituted on) 88'), Kr. Horváth (Kobouri (substituted on) 90+3'), Beridze (Geiger (substituted on) 76') • Manager: Krznar (yellow card) 52' • Player of the match: Krisztofer Horváth, Újpest 7.7 • Best player of Diósgyőr: Elton Acolatse 7.3

8 November 2025 13	Újpest	0–3	Győri ETO	Budapest
12:45 CET	Fiola (yellow card) 60'; Gonçalves (yellow card) 85'	Report	Schön 28'; Benbouali 59', 71'	Stadium: Szusza Ferenc Stadion; Attendance: 4,743; Referee: Tamás Bognár; Assistant referees: Balázs Buzás, Péter Garai
Note: • Újpest: Piscitelli — Rasak, João Nunes, Kaczvinszki, Gonçalves — Matko (c), Ljujić (Ademi (substituted on) 46'), Lacoux (Fiola (substituted on) 46'), Geiger ((Tučić (substituted on) 46'), Beridze (Vlijter (substituted on) 71') — Medeiros (Tajti (substituted on) 78') • Manager: Krznar • Player of the match: Szabolcs Schön, Győri ETO 8.9 • Best player of Újpest: Riccardo Piscitelli 7.9

23 November 2025 14	Paks	1–3	Újpest	Paks
16:00 CET	Lenzsér (yellow card) 50'; Böde 84'; Kinyik (yellow card) 90+4'	Report	Matko 23', 75'; Fiola (yellow card) 37'; Beridze (penalty missed) 49'; Tajti 57'; Ganea (yellow card) 90+4'; Rasak (yellow card) 90+4'	Stadium: Fehérvári úti Stadion; Attendance: 3,012; Referee: Márton Rúsz; Assistant referees: Péter Kóbor, Péter Ország
Note: • Újpest: Banai (c) — Fiola, Bese (Kaczvinszki (substituted on) 85'), João Nunes, Tamás — Rasak, Lacoux — Matko (Ganea (substituted on) 85'), Tajti (Geiger (substituted on) 70'), Kr. Horváth (Gergényi (substituted on) 77') — Beridze (Ljujić (substituted on) 85') • Interim manager: Bodor • Player of the match: Aljoša Matko, Újpest 8.4 • Best player of Paks: Ádám Kovácsik 7.4

30 November 2025 15	Kisvárda	3–0	Újpest	Kisvárda
13:45 CET	K. Nagy 57' (yellow card) 61'; Bíró 63'; Cipetić 80' (yellow card) 82'; Pintér (yellow card) 87'	Report	Matko (penalty missed) 15'; Kobouri (yellow card) 82'	Stadium: Várkerti Stadion; Attendance: 2,120; Referee: Tamás Bognár; Assistant referees: Balázs Szert, Viktor Nagy
Note: • Újpest: Banai (c) — Gergényi, João Nunes, Kobouri, Tamás — Rasak, Lacoux — Matko (Vlijter (substituted on) 63'), Tajti (Medeiros (substituted on) 63'), Kr. Horváth (Tučić (substituted on) 74') — Beridze • Interim manager: Bodor • Player of the match: Branimir Cipetić, Kisvárda 8.4 • Best player of Újpest: Giorgi Beridze 7.6

7 December 2025 16	Újpest	0–2	Zalaegerszeg	Budapest
19:30 CET	Tajti (yellow card) 16'	Report	João Victor 58' (yellow card) 58'; G. Bodnár (yellow card) 81'; Krajcsovics 90+2'	Stadium: Szusza Ferenc Stadion; Attendance: 3,057; Referee: Márton Rúsz; Assistant referees: Gergő Vígh-Tarsonyi, Balázs Szalai
Note: • Újpest: Banai — Fiola (c) (Ljujić (substituted on) 84'), João Nunes, Kaczvinszki, Kobouri — Matko (Medeiros (substituted on) 62'), Rasak, Lacoux, Kr. Horváth (Geiger (substituted on) 88') — Beridze (Tučić (substituted on) 84'), Tajti (Vlijter (substituted on) 62') • Interim manager: Bodor • Player of the match: Alen Skribek, Zalaegerszeg 7.8 • Best player of Újpest: Damian Rasak 7.3

13 December 2025 17	MTK	3–4	Újpest	Budapest
19:00 CET	Lacoux 12' (o.g.); Törőcsik 68'; H. Németh 81'; Plšek (yellow card) 88'; Jurina (yellow card) 90'	Report	João Nunes (yellow card) 41'; Matko 45', 77'; P. Kovács 53' (o.g.); Kaczvinszki (yellow card) 80'; Kr. Horváth 85'	Stadium: Hidegkuti Nándor Stadion; Attendance: 3,721; Referee: Mihály Káprály; Assistant referees: István Albert, Bence Belicza
Note: • Újpest: Banai (c) — Fiola, João Nunes, Kaczvinszki (Tučić (substituted on) 90+3'), Kobouri (Fehér (substituted on) 46' (substituted off) 76' (Gergényi (substituted on) 76')) — Ljujić (Kr. Horváth (substituted on) 68'), Rasak, Lacoux, Beridze — Matko, Tajti (Ademi (substituted on) 68') • Interim manager: Bodor • Player of the match: Aljoša Matko, Újpest 8.1 • Best player of MTK: Péter Törőcsik 7.9

21 December 2025 18	Újpest	2–1	Kazincbarcika	Budapest
15:00 CET	Lacoux (yellow card) 42'; Kr. Horváth (yellow card) 50'; Tučić 63'; João Nunes 84'; Fiola (yellow card) 88'	Report	Meskhi (yellow card) 20' (yellow-red card) 81'; Meshack 67'; Kun (yellow card) 80'; Berecz (yellow card) 88'	Stadium: Szusza Ferenc Stadion; Attendance: 4,520; Referee: Péter Zierkelbach; Assistant referees: Péter Garai, István Szécsényi
Note: • Újpest: Banai (c) — Rasak, João Nunes, Fiola (c), Gergényi — Ljujić (Tučić (substituted on) 58'), Tajti, Lacoux (Ademi (substituted on) 58'), Beridze (Ganea (substituted on) 82') — Matko, Kr. Horváth (Geiger (substituted on) 90+1') • Interim manager: Bodor • Player of the match: Milan Tučić, Újpest 8.1 • Best player of Kazincbarcika: Meshack 7.8

24 January 2026 19	Nyíregyháza	1–1	Újpest	Nyíregyháza
12:30 CET	Temesvári (yellow card) 13'; Kvasina 45'; B. Katona (red card) 52'	Report	Beridze 19'	Stadium: Városi Stadion; Attendance: 3,750; Referee: Bence Csonka dr. Assistant referees: Vencel Tóth II, Viktor Nagy
Note: • Újpest: Banai — G. Bodnár (Gergényi (substituted on) 74'), João Nunes, Stronati, Fiola (c) — Rasak (Brodić (substituted on) 74'), Ljujić, Lacoux (Fenyő (substituted on) 62') — Matko, Tučić, Beridze (Krajcsovics (substituted on) 74') • Manager: Szélesi • Player of the match: Dávid Banai, Újpest 7.9 • Best player of Nyíregyháza: Marko Kvasina 7.7

31 January 2026 20	Újpest	0–1	Puskás Akadémia	Budapest
18:30 CET	Nunes (yellow card) 44'	Report	Golla (yellow card) 65'; Lukács (yellow card) 77'; Fameyeh 80' (yellow card) 81'	Stadium: Szusza Ferenc Stadion; Attendance: 4,078; Referee: Mihály Káprály; Assistant referees: Péter Kóbor, Balázs Huszár
Note: • Újpest: Banai — G. Bodnár, Nunes, Stronati, Fiola (c) — Matko (Vlijter (substituted on) 83'), Lacoux (Ademi (substituted on) 59'), Fenyő (Kr. Horváth (substituted on) 78'), Beridze (Brodić (substituted on) 78') — Tučić (Gradišar (substituted on) 59'), Ljujić • Manager: Szélesi • Player of the match: Joel Fameyeh, Puskás Akadémia 7.8 • Best player of Újpest: Matija Ljujić 7.6

7 February 2026 21	Ferencváros	3–0	Újpest	Budapest
17:00 CET	Kovačević 10'; Gómez 36'; Kanichowsky 45+1'; Gómez (yellow card) 87'; Romão (yellow card) 90'; Raemaekers (yellow card) 90+4'	Report	Fiola (yellow card) 90+4'; Kr. Horváth (yellow card) 90+4'	Stadium: Ferencváros Stadion; Attendance: 18,779; Referee: Tamás Bognár; Assistant referees: Balázs Buzás, Norbert Bornemissza
Note: • Újpest: Banai — G. Bodnár, Nunes (Gergényi (substituted on) 46'), Stronati, Fiola (c) — Matko (Brodić (substituted on) 68'), Maier (Kr. Horváth (substituted on) 35'), Fenyő (Lacoux (substituted on) 68'), Beridze (Vlijter (substituted on) 46') — Gradišar, Ljujić • Manager: Szélesi • Player of the match: Attila Osváth, Ferencváros 8.1 • Best player of Újpest: Krisztofer Horváth 7.1

13 February 2026 22	Újpest	2–1	Debrecen	Budapest
20:00 CET	Matko 15', 64' (yellow card) 44'; Vlijter (yellow card) 37'	Report	T. Szűcs (yellow card) 40' (yellow-red card) 55'; Youga 67'; Komáromi (yellow card) 75'	Stadium: Szusza Ferenc Stadion; Attendance: 4,279; Referee: Gergő Bogár; Assistant referees: István Albert, Zoltán Horváth
Note: • Újpest: Banai — G. Bodnár (Bese (substituted on) 78'), Nunes, Stronati, Fiola (c) — Matko (Brodić (substituted on) 67'), Ljujić (Lacoux (substituted on) 78'), Fenyő, Vlijter (Beridze (substituted on) 57') — Tučić, Gradišar (Krajcsovics (substituted on) 67') • Manager: Szélesi • Player of the match: Gleofilo Vlijter, Újpest 8.4 • Best player of Debrecen: Amos Youga 8.2

21 February 2026 23	Újpest	2–1	Diósgyőr	Budapest
18:30 CET	Vlijter 19'; Gradišar 22'; Fiola (yellow card) 57'; Stronati (yellow card) 87'	Report	Holdampf (yellow card) 29'; L. Kastrati (yellow card) 39'; Esiti (yellow card) 83'; Croizet 88' (pen.)	Stadium: Szusza Ferenc Stadion; Attendance: 4,243; Referee: Bence Csonka dr. Assistant referees: Gergő Vígh-Tarsonyi, Viktor Nagy
Note: • Újpest: Banai — G. Bodnár (Bese (substituted on) 89'), Nunes, Stronati, Fiola (c) — Fenyő, Ljujić — Matko (Kr. Horváth (substituted on) 61'), Brodić (Tučić (substituted on) 61'), Vlijter (Krajcsovics (substituted on) 46') — Gradišar (B. Katona (substituted on) 84') • Manager: Szélesi • Player of the match: Gleofilo Vlijter, Újpest 8.3 • Best player of Diósgyőr: Karlo Sentić 7.9

28 February 2026 24	Győri ETO	2–1	Újpest	Győr
19:30 CET	Miangué (yellow card) 31'; R. Tóth (yellow card) 52'; Gavrić 61'; Nunes 83' (o.g.); Vitális (yellow card) 90+2'	Report	Vlijter (yellow card) 45'; Brodić 46'; Kr. Horváth (yellow card) 49'; Fenyő (yellow card) 66'	Stadium: ETO Park; Attendance: 6,755; Referee: Balázs Berke; Assistant referees: István Széchenyi, Péter Ország
Note: • Újpest: Banai — G. Bodnár (Krajcsovics (substituted on) 90+2'), Nunes, Stronati, Fiola (c) — Matko, Ljujić, Fenyő (Lacoux (substituted on) 68'), Vlijter (Kr. Horváth (substituted on) 46') — Brodić (Beridze (substituted on) 68'), Gradišar (Tučić (substituted on) 84')• Manager: Szélesi • Player of the match: Milán Vitális, Győri ETO 7.5 • Best player of Újpest: Fran Brodić 7.4

7 March 2026 25	Újpest	0–0	Paks	Budapest
19:30 CET	Ljujić (yellow card) 60'; Krajcsovics (yellow card) 67'; G. Bodnár (yellow card) 71'; Fiola (red card) 81'	Report	Ke. Horváth (yellow card) 16'; B. Balogh (yellow card) 75'; Lenzsér (yellow card) 81'	Stadium: Szusza Ferenc Stadion; Attendance: 5,117; Referee: Márton Rúsz; Assistant referees: Bence Belicza, Ákos Berényi
Note: • Újpest: Banai — G. Bodnár, Nunes (c), Stronati, Fiola — Matko (Beridze (substituted on) 90'), Fenyő, Ljujić, Vlijter (Krajcsovics (substituted on) 59') — Kr. Horváth (Brodić (substituted on) 59' (substituted off) 83' (Gergényi (substituted on) 83')), Gradišar (Tučić (substituted on) 90') • Manager: Szélesi • Player of the match: Dávid Banai, Újpest 8.7 • Best player of Paks: Kristóf Hinora 7.6

14 March 2026 26	Újpest	2–1	Kisvárda	Budapest
14:30 CET	Bese 5'; Ljujić 59' (pen.)	Report	Be. Bíró 26'; K. Nagy (yellow card) 63'; Szőr (yellow card) 81'	Stadium: Szusza Ferenc Stadion; Attendance: 5,057; Referee: Mihály Káprály; Assistant referees: István Albert, Zoltán Horváth
Note: • Újpest: Banai — Bese, Nunes (c), Stronati, Gergényi — Matko (Krajcsovics (substituted on) 46'), Ljujić, Fenyő (Lacoux (substituted on) 46'), Kr. Horváth (Vlijter (substituted on) 88') — Brodić (Maier (substituted on) 83'), Gradišar (Tučić (substituted on) 69') • Manager: Szélesi • Player of the match: Barnabás Bese, Újpest 7.9 • Best player of Kisvárda: Nikola Radmanovac 7.0

21 March 2026 27	Zalaegerszeg	2–0	Újpest	Zalaegerszeg
16:30 CET	N. Szendrei 74'; Calderón 90+4'	Report		Stadium: ZTE Arena; Attendance: 4,445; Referee: Marcell Dedák; Assistant referees: Gergely Becséri, Viktor Nagy

4 April 2026 28	Újpest	2–2	MTK	Budapest
19:30 CEST	Matko 10'; Krajcsovics (yellow card) 37'; Kr. Horváth (yellow card) 78' (goal) 87' (pen.)	Report	Á. Molnár 23' (pen.); P. Kovács (yellow card) 85'; Kádár (yellow card) 87'; Jurek 90+5'	Stadium: Szusza Ferenc Stadion; Attendance: 5,131; Referee: Péter Zierkelbach; Assistant referees: Péter Garai, Dávid Rózsa
Note: • Újpest: Banai — G. Bodnár, Fiola (c), Stronati, Gergényi — Krajcsovics (Gradišar (substituted on) 55'), Ljujić, Fenyő (Ademi (substituted on) 71'), Kr. Horváth — Brodić (Maier (substituted on) 55'), Matko (Sarkadi (substituted on) 90') • Manager: Szélesi • Player of the match: Aljoša Matko, Újpest 7.7 • Best player of MTK: Gábor Jurek 7.6

11 April 2026 29	Kazincbarcika	0–3	Újpest	Mezőkövesd
15:15 CEST	Pukhtieiev (yellow card) 39'; Meskhi (yellow card) 51'; Ferenczi (yellow card) 51'	Report	Krajcsovics 16'; Nyíri 49' (o.g.); Mi. Mucsányi 90+1'	Stadium: Városi Stadion; Attendance: 865; Referee: Marcell Derdák; Assistant referees: Bence Belicza, Dániel Szalai
Note: • Újpest: Banai — Sarkadi, Fiola (c), Stronati, Gergényi — Krajcsovics (Gradišar (substituted on) 72'), Fenyő, Maier (Ademi (substituted on) 72'), Kr. Horváth (Brodić (substituted on) 86') — Ljujić (Mi. Mucsányi (substituted on) 86'), Matko • Manager: Szélesi • Player of the match: Krisztofer Horváth, Újpest 7.8 • Best player of Kazincbarcika: Bálint Kártik 6.9

17 April 2026 30	Újpest	7–2	Nyíregyháza	Budapest
20:00 CEST	Kr. Horváth 3', 16', 71'; Ljujić 6'; Fenyő (yellow card) 18'; Antonov (yellow card) 47'; M. Kovács (yellow card) 48'; Krajcsovics 53'; Matko 65', 86'	Report	M. Katona (yellow card) 68'; Kvasina 81'; Tijani 84'	Stadium: Szusza Ferenc Stadion; Attendance: 5,110; Referee: Tamás Bognár; Assistant referees: Balázs Szalai, Zoltán Horváth
Note: • Újpest: Banai — G. Bodnár (Sarkadi (substituted on) 79'), Fiola (c), Stronati, Gergényi (Fehér (substituted on) 58') — Krajcsovics (Vlijter (substituted on) 67'), Maier, Fenyő (Mi. Mucsányi (substituted on) 67'), Kr. Horváth — Matko, Ljujić (Brodić (substituted on) 67') • Manager: Szélesi • Player of the match: Krisztofer Horváth, Újpest 10.0 • Best player of Nyíregyháza: Marko Kvasina 7.7

25 April 2026 31	Puskás Akadémia	2–0	Újpest	Felcsút
17:00 CEST	Markgráf 12'; Zs. Nagy (yellow card) 35'; Szolnoki 55'	Report	Fiola (yellow card) 50'	Stadium: Pancho Aréna; Attendance: 2,500; Referee: Balázs Berke; Assistant referees: Péter Ország, Viktor Nagy
Note: • Újpest: Banai (Dombó (substituted on) 25') — G. Bodnár (Sarkadi (substituted on) 88'), Fiola (c) (João Nunes (substituted on) 63'), Stronati, Gergényi — Krajcsovics, Fenyő, Ljujić, Maier (Brodić (substituted on) 63') — Kr. Horváth (Gradišar (substituted on) 63'), Matko • Manager: Szélesi • Player of the match: Ákos Markgráf, Puskás Akadémia 8.1 • Best player of Újpest: Dávid Dombó 8.0

3 May 2026 32	Újpest	0–5	Ferencváros	Budapest
16:00 CEST	G. Bodnár (yellow card) 27'; Fiola (yellow card) 40'; Ljujić (yellow card) 45'; Kr. Horváth (yellow card) 51'; Vlijter (yellow card) 70'	Report	Zachariassen 19'; Szalai (yellow card) 30'; Kanichowsky 40'; Joseph 49', 64'; Abu Fani 90+9'	Stadium: Szusza Ferenc Stadion; Attendance: 10,930; Referee: Bence Csonka dr. Assistant referees: Vencel Tóth II, Georgiou Theodoros

16 May 2026 33	Debrecen	2–1	Újpest	Debrecen
17:15 CEST	Mejias 11' (yellow card) 15'; Komáromi 45+1' (yellow card) 79'; Batik (yellow card) 90+4'	Report	Fenyő (yellow card) 38'; Ademi (yellow card) 53'; Matko (yellow card) 79' (goal) 86' (pen.); Gradišar (yellow card) 90+3'	Stadium: Nagyerdei Stadion; Attendance: 9,444; Referee: Gergő Bogár; Assistant referees: István Albert, József Aradi

=== Magyar Kupa ===
==== Round of 64 ====
14 September 2025 R64	Kecskemét (NB II)	3–2	Újpest	Kecskemét
16:15 CEST	Derekas 6' (yellow card) 31'; A. Szabó 38'; Eördögh (yellow card) 40'; Merényi (yellow card) 90'; Banó-Szabó 109'; Győrfi (yellow card) 114'; Czékus (yellow card) 115'; B. Varga (yellow card) 115'	Report	Kr. Horváth 9'; Duarte (yellow card) 37'; Tučić (yellow card) 44'; Medeiros 70'; Fiola (yellow card) 114'; Bese (yellow card) 118'	Stadium: Széktói Stadion; Attendance: 1,532; Referee: Mihály Káprály; Assistant referees: Gergő Vígh-Tarsonyi, Dávid Rózsa
Note: • Újpest: Banai (c) — Bese, João Nunes, Gergényi (Fiola (substituted on) 66'), Duarte — Rasak (Ljujić (substituted on) 46'), Ademi (Tiago (substituted on) 66') — Kr. Horváth (Beridze (substituted on) 46'), Medeiros, Matko (Vlijter (substituted on) 103') — Tučić (Tajti (substituted on) 106') • Manager: Krznar

== See also ==
- List of Újpest FC seasons
- Ferencvárosi TC–Újpest FC rivalry: local derby between Ferencváros and Újpest
