= Mendy (surname) =

Mendy is a surname. Notable people with the surname include:

== Sports ==
=== Boxing ===
- Ambrose Mendy (born 1954), British boxing promoter
- Christophe Mendy (born 1971), French boxer
- Jean Baptiste Mendy (born 1963), French professional boxer
- Jean-Paul Mendy (born 1973), French boxer
- Patrick Mendy (born 1990), Gambian professional boxer

=== Football ===
- Alexandre Mendy (born 1983), French footballer
- Arnaud Mendy (born 1990), Bissau-Guinean footballer
- Benjamin Mendy (born 1994), French footballer
- Bernard Mendy (born 1981), French footballer
- Christian Mendy (born 1984), French-Senegalese footballer
- Danlaba Mendy (born 1976), French footballer
- Dominique Mendy (born 1983), Senegalese footballer
- Édouard Mendy (born 1992), Senegalese footballer
- Elvin Mendy (born 2002), Gambian footballer
- Ferland Mendy (born 1995), French footballer
- Frédéric Mendy (footballer, born 1973), French footballer
- Frédéric Mendy (footballer, born 1981), Senegalese-French footballer
- Frédéric Mendy (footballer, born 1988), French-born Bissau-Guinean footballer
- Gaston Mendy (born 1985), Senegalese footballer
- Jackson Mendy (born 1987), French-born Senegalese footballer
- Jacob Mendy (born 1996), Gambian footballer
- Jean-Paul Mendy (footballer) (born 1982), French footballer
- Jean-Philippe Mendy (born 1987), French footballer
- Jules Mendy (born 1994), Senegalese footballer
- Léonard Mendy (born 1989), French footballer
- Matthew Mendy (born 1983), Gambian footballer
- Nampalys Mendy (born 1992), French footballer
- Nestor Mendy (born 1995), Senegalese footballer
- Pascal Mendy (born 1979), Senegalese footballer
- Remond Mendy (born 1985), Senegalese footballer
- Roger Mendy (born 1960), Senegalese footballer
- Victor Mendy (born 1981), French-Senegalese footballer
- Vincent Mendy (born 1988), French footballer

=== Other ===
- Claudine Mendy (born 1990), French handball player
- Domingo Mendy (born 1870, date of death unknown), Uruguayan Olympic fencer
- Ignacio Mendy (born 2000), Argentine rugby union player
- Pedro Mendy (born 1872, date of death unknown), Uruguayan Olympic fencer

== See also ==
- Mendy (disambiguation)
- Mendy (given name)
