= Mendy =

Mendy can refer to:

- Mendy (surname), a last name
- Mendy (given name), a first name
- Idaux-Mendy, commune in the Pyrénées-Atlantiques department in south-western France
- Mendy and the Golem, comic book featuring Jewish characters
- Mendy's, a chain of Kosher restaurants, mentioned on the sitcom Seinfeld
