= Mendy (given name) =

Mendy is a given name and can refer to:

People

- Mendy Rudolph (1926–1979), professional basketball referee
- Mendy López (born 1973), Dominican baseball utility player
- Mendy Pellin, Hassidic comic
- Mendy Samstein (1938–2007), American civil rights activist
- Mendy Commanda a 1998 World Series of Poker champion in $1,000 Ladies - Limit 7 Card Stud
- Mendy Fry (born 1969), American dragster and funny car driver
- Emanuel Weiss (1906–1944), nicknamed "Mendy," professional hitman

Fiction

- Mendy and the Golem, comic book featuring Jewish characters

== See also ==
- Mendy (disambiguation)
- Mendy (surname)
