= Boldizsár Bodor =

Hungarian football player and manager (born 1982)

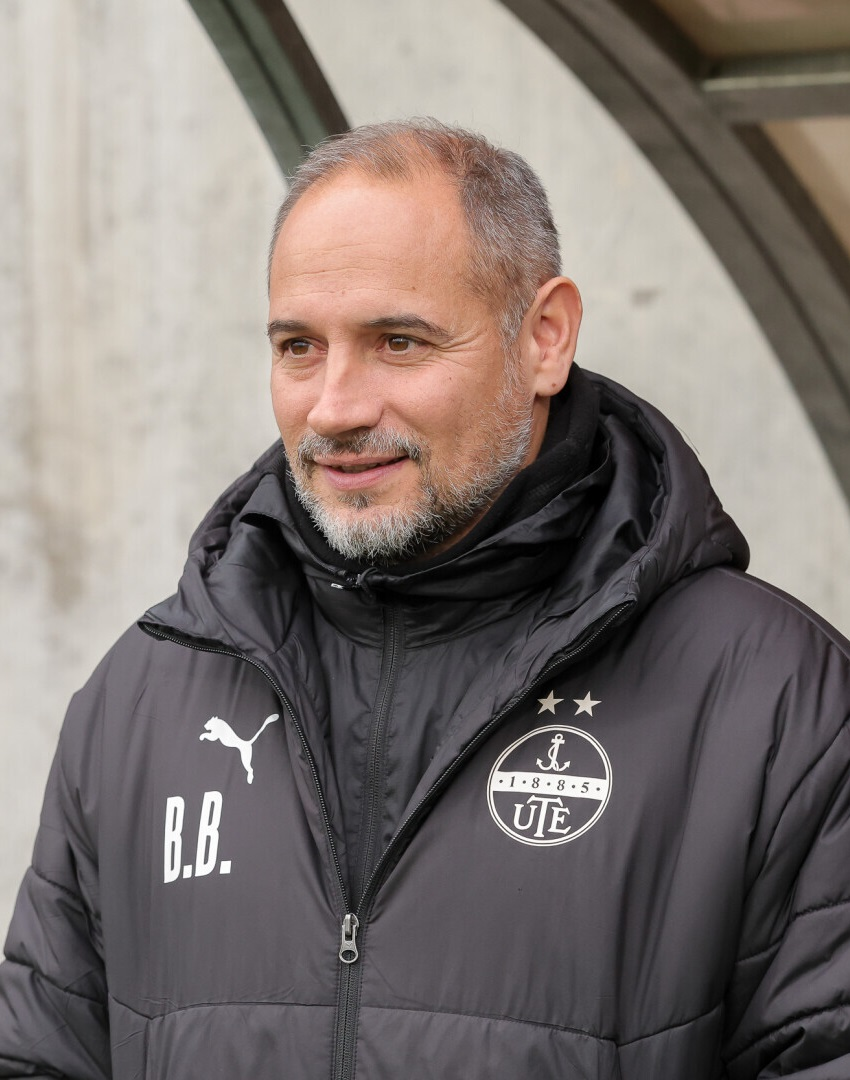
- Bodor managing Újpest in 2025

Personal information
- Date of birth: 27 April 1982 (age 44)
- Place of birth: Pécs, Hungary
- Height: 1.81 m (5 ft 11 1/2 in)
- Position: Left back

Senior career*
| Years | Team | Apps | (Gls) |
| 1999–2000 | Pécsi Mecsek FC | 9 | (1) |
| 2000–2004 | Germinal Beerschot | 78 | (2) |
| 2004–2011 | Roda JC | 228 | (22) |
| 2011–2012 | OFI | 16 | (0) |
| 2012–2013 | Beerschot AC | 24 | (1) |
| 2013–2014 | NAC Breda | 17 | (0) |
| 2015– | K.F.C. Antonia | 10 | (0) |

International career^{‡}
| 1996–1997 | Hungary U14 | 2 | (0) |
| 1998–1999 | Hungary U16 | 15 | (1) |
| 1999–2000 | Hungary U17 | 7 | (0) |
| 1999–2000 | Hungary U18 | 4 | (0) |
| 2003–2010 | Hungary | 24 | (0) |

Managerial career
- 2025: Újpest (interim)
- * Club domestic league appearances and goals as of 1 June 2014 (UTC) ‡ National team caps and goals as of 3 March 2010 (UTC)

Boldizsár Bodor (Hungarian pronunciation: [ˈboldiʒaːr ˈbodor]; born 27 April 1982 in Pécs) is a Hungarian football (soccer) player, who is currently playing for K.F.C. Antonia. His former clubs include OFI, Roda JC, Beerschot AC and NAC Breda. From 2000 to 2004, he played for K.F.C. Germinal Beerschot, the predecessor of Beerschot AC. He is a solid, versatile player with a good attitude and can play as a left back, left winger or in a defensive midfield role; his main traits are his excellent one-touch passes, accurate cross-field balls and bursts forward when the team are attacking. Bodor is also a freekick specialist and is renowned for a powerful left foot.

== Club career ==
After starting his career at Hungarian club Pécsi Mecsek FC in 1999 but left in 2000. Bodor then earned a move to Belgium club K.F.C. Germinal Beerschot in 2001 where he was initially mainly used a substitute, but managed to become a first team regular up until he left the club after the 2003–04 season. He then moved to the Dutch Eredivise in 2004 when he joined Roda JC. In 2004, he played for Roda JC in Europe in the Intertoto Cup competition.

In 2008 Bodor scored a vital goal for Roda JC which was enough to keep them in the Eredivise during a relegation playoff after Roda JC had finished the season third from bottom. He remained a regular at Roda JC playing either as a left back or as a left winger for the club. He stayed at Roda until his contract expired in the summer of 2011 with his final match for Roda coming on 22 May against Ado Den Haag. During the 2010–11 season Bodor played 28 Eredivise games for Roda scoring 2 goals.

On 23 July 2011, he played for Leeds United against Sheffield Wednesday in a pre-season friendly where he came on for the injured Ben Parker. Bodor continued his trial with Leeds and was supposed to attend the club's trip to Norway after impressing Leeds manager Simon Grayson, however the manager decided it would be better for Bodor to play in the local Leeds XI friendly against Bradford Park Avenue. Bodor also played for Leeds in their 3–2 win against Newcastle United at Elland Road, coming on as a second-half substitute. After the match manager Grayson said he would make a decision whether to sign Bodor and fellow trialist Alex Mendy in the next two days after saying he felt both trialists had done ok in their spells. Bodor was released from his trial spell on 4 August after failing to land a contract at Leeds.

On 31 August 2011, he signed a one-year contract with a newly promoted Super League Greece side OFI.

In 2012, he returned to his former club Beerschot AC, signing a one-year contract.

After the bankruptcy of Beerschot, Bodor became a free agent. He signed with Netherlands side NAC Breda in July 2013.

== Managerial career ==
Bodor took over Nemzeti Bajnokság I club Újpest as interim manager on 9 November 2025 following the dismissal of Damir Krznar. In his first match in charge, Újpest defeated Paks away from home, before suffering consecutive league defeats against Kisvárda and Zalaegerszeg. The team then closed the calendar year with back-to-back victories, winning 4–3 away at MTK and 2–1 at home against Kazincbarcika, giving Bodor a record of three wins and two losses in five league matches. On 30 December 2025, Zoltán Szélesi was appointed as the club's new manager, replacing him.

== International career ==
After playing for the Hungary national side through various age groups, In November 2003 Bodor made his debut for the full Hungary national side in a 1–0 loss against Estonia. He has since managed to gain 24 caps for the national side.

== Honours ==
=== Player ===
Roda JC

- KNVB Cup runner-up: 2007–08

== International statistics ==
(Statistics correct as of 15 October 2008)

National Team Performance
| Team | Year | Friendlies | | International Competition | | Total |
| Team | Year | App | Conceded | App | Conceded | App | Conceded |
|---|---|---|---|---|---|---|---|
| Hungary | 2009 | 1 | 0 | 2 | 0 | 3 | 0 |
| Hungary | 2008 | 2 | 0 | 2 | 0 | 4 | 0 |
| Hungary | 2007 | 1 | 0 | 2 | 0 | 3 | 0 |
| Hungary | 2006 | 1 | 0 | — | — | 1 | 0 |
| Hungary | 2005 | — | — | — | — | 0 | 0 |
| Hungary | 2004 | 6 | 0 | 1 | 0 | 7 | 0 |
| Hungary | 2003 | 1 | 0 | — | — | 1 | 0 |
| Total | | 12 | 0 | 7 | 0 | 19 | 0 |
