= Alexandre Mendy =

Alexandre Mendy may refer to:

- Alexandre Mendy (footballer, born 1983), French football rightback
- Alexandre Mendy (footballer, born 1994), Bissau-Guinean football striker
