= Gleofilo Vlijter =

Surinamese footballer (born 1999)

Personal information
- Full name: Gleofilo Sabrino Rudewald Vlijter
- Date of birth: 17 September 1999 (age 27)
- Place of birth: Paramaribo, Suriname
- Height: 1.76 m (5 ft 9 1/2 in)
- Position: Striker

Team information
- Current team: Újpest
- Number: 39

Youth career
- 2013–2015: Robinhood
- 2015–2016: → Phoenix All Stars Football Academy
- 2018: Ironi Kiryat Shmona

Senior career*
Years	Team	Apps	(Gls)
2018–2019	Torpedo Kutaisi	3	(1)
2019–2020	Aris Limassol	19	(15)
2020–2022	Beitar Jerusalem	49	(6)
2022–2023	→ Hapoel Ramat Gan (loan)	32	(13)
2023–2024	Doxa Katokopias	14	(0)
2024	VPS	15	(3)
2024–2025	OFK Beograd	32	(10)
2025–	Újpest	36	(4)

International career^{‡}
2015–	Suriname	37	(15)
- * Club domestic league appearances and goals as of 17:00, 21 November 2026 (UTC) ‡ National team caps and goals as of 5 October 2026 (UTC)

Gleofilo Sabrino Rudewald Vlijter (born 17 September 1999) is a Surinamese professional footballer who plays as a striker for Hungarian Nemzeti Bajnokság club Újpest and the Suriname national team.

Vlijter is currently Suriname's all-time top goalscorer.

== Club career ==
=== Youth career ===
Vlijter started his career with S.V. Robinhood of the SVB Hoofdklasse, the highest level of football in Suriname. He was with the club since at least December 2013. In May 2014, he was invited to a football clinic in Suriname sponsored by Chelsea.

In January 2015, while a member of the Phoenix All Stars Football Academy in Jamaica, Vlijter traveled to Europe for the first time as he was invited to a trial with Belgian top-division club Genk. At that time, he received a letter of recommendation from the club to apply for a visa. However, a deal with that club and another with KV Oostende fell through and the player returned to Suriname.

In October 2016 it was announced that Vlijter and fellow Surinamese youth international Ayad Godlieb were on trial with Feyenoord Rotterdam of the Dutch Eredivisie. It was expected that they would be signed to a contract with the club's academy in January 2017 if they could acquire work visas. The pair of players first trialed with the club in September 2016 while still playing for S.V. Robinhood in Suriname.

On 9 January 2018 he signed for the youth team of Ironi Kiryat Shmona for the remainder of the season with a club option for further three years.

=== Senior career ===
After one season with the Israeli club in which he was primarily a member of the reserve team he signed for FC Torpedo Kutaisi of the Georgian Erovnuli Liga. He joined as the team was preparing to enter the preliminary round of the 2018–19 UEFA Champions League.

In August 2019 it was announced that Vlijter had signed a two-year contract with Aris Limassol of the Cypriot Second Division. In his first unofficial match with Aris Limassol, he scored a hat-trick against AEZ. He made his league debut for Aris in a 0–1 loss to Alki Oroklini.

On 4 August 2020, Vlijter signed a three-year deal with Israeli Premier League club Beitar Jerusalem.

After a stint with Doxa Katokopias in Cypriot First Division, Vlijter signed with Veikkausliiga club Vaasan Palloseura (VPS) in Finland. His deal with VPS was terminated on 6 August 2024.

Vlijter joined OFK Beograd on 8 August 2024.

Vlijter was transferred to Újpest on 5 July 2025.

== Personal life ==
Gleofilo is the cousin of Surinamese internationals Nigel Hasselbaink and Roscello Vlijter. His dad also played in the SVB Hoofdklasse.

== International career ==
Vlijter represented Suriname at the U15 and U16 levels. During a U15 tournament held in French Guiana in late 2013, he was identified by the coaching staff as one of four players who impressed the most. He made his senior international debut at age 15 on 30 April 2015 in a friendly against Guyana.

Vlijter won the Golden Boot Award for the 2019–20 CONCACAF Nations League after scoring ten goals in six matches in League B. In June 2021 Vlijter was named to Suriname's 23-man squad for the 2021 CONCACAF Gold Cup. On 16 July 2021 he scored Suriname's first-ever CONCACAF Gold Cup goal in a 1–2 defeat to Costa Rica.

On 15 October 2023, Vlijter tied Stefano Rijssel's goal scoring record by netting his fourteenth goal for Suriname in a 4-0 win against Grenada during 2023–24 CONCACAF Nations League A.

On 11 October 2024, during a 1-1 draw with Costa Rica in the 2024–25 CONCACAF Nations League, he scored his 15th international goal to become Suriname’s sole top goalscorer.

== Career statistics ==
=== Club ===
As of match played 21 November 2026

Appearances and goals by club, season and competition
Club	Season	League			Cup		Continental		Other		Total	
Club	Season	Division	Apps	Goals	Apps	Goals	Apps	Goals	Apps	Goals	Apps	Goals
Torpedo Kutaisi	2018	Erovnuli Liga	3	1	0	0	—		—		3	1
Aris Limassol	2019–20	Cypriot Second Division	18	13	1	1	—		—		19	14
Beitar Jerusalem	2020–21	Israeli Premier League	22	1	1	0	1	0	3	0	27	1
Beitar Jerusalem	2021–22	Israeli Premier League	25	5	2	0	0	0	0	0	27	5
Beitar Jerusalem	2022–23	Israeli Premier League	2	0	1	0	0	0	0	0	3	0
Beitar Jerusalem	Total		49	6	4	0	1	0	3	0	57	6
Hapoel Ramat Gan (loan)	2022–23	Liga Leumit	32	13	1	0	—		—		33	13
Hapoel Ramat Gan (loan)	Total		32	13	1	0	0	0	0	0	33	13
Doxa Katokopias	2023–24	Cypriot First Division	14	0	1	0	—		—		15	0
VPS	2024	Veikkausliiga	15	3	2	1	2	0	0	0	19	4
OFK Beograd	2024–25	Serbian SuperLiga	32	10	1	1	—		—		33	11
Újpest	2025–26	Nemzeti Bajnokság I	22	1	1	0	—		—		23	1
Újpest	2026–27	Nemzeti Bajnokság I	14	3	2	0	–		–		16	3
Újpest	Total		36	4	3	0	0	0	0	0	39	4
Career total			199	53	13	3	3	0	3	0	218	56

=== International ===
As of match played 5 October 2026

Appearances and goals by national team and year
National team	Year	Apps	Goals
Suriname
Suriname	2015	1	0
Suriname	2019	6	10
Suriname	2021	5	3
Suriname	2022	3	0
Suriname	2023	5	1
Suriname	2024	6	1
Suriname	2025	8	0
Suriname	2026	3	0
Total		37	15

Scores and results list Suriname's goal tally first.

List of international goals scored by Gleofilo Vlijter
No.	Date	Venue	Opponent	Score	Result	Competition
1.	5 September 2019	Windsor Park, Roseau, Dominica	Dominica	1–0	2–0	2019–20 CONCACAF Nations League B
2.	5 September 2019	Windsor Park, Roseau, Dominica	Dominica	2–0	2–0	2019–20 CONCACAF Nations League B
3.	8 September 2019	André Kamperveen Stadion, Paramaribo, Suriname	Nicaragua	1–0	6–0	2019–20 CONCACAF Nations League B
4.	8 September 2019	André Kamperveen Stadion, Paramaribo, Suriname	Nicaragua	2–0	6–0	2019–20 CONCACAF Nations League B
5.	8 September 2019	André Kamperveen Stadion, Paramaribo, Suriname	Nicaragua	4–0	6–0	2019–20 CONCACAF Nations League B
6.	8 September 2019	André Kamperveen Stadion, Paramaribo, Suriname	Nicaragua	5–0	6–0	2019–20 CONCACAF Nations League B
7.	11 October 2019	Arnos Vale Stadium, Arnos Vale, Saint Vincent and the Grenadines	Saint Vincent and the Grenadines	1–0	2–2	2019–20 CONCACAF Nations League B
8.	11 October 2019	Arnos Vale Stadium, Arnos Vale, Saint Vincent and the Grenadines	Saint Vincent and the Grenadines	2–0	2–2	2019–20 CONCACAF Nations League B
9.	15 November 2019	André Kamperveen Stadion, Paramaribo, Suriname	Dominica	2–0	4–0	2019–20 CONCACAF Nations League B
10.	15 November 2019	André Kamperveen Stadion, Paramaribo, Suriname	Dominica	3–0	4–0	2019–20 CONCACAF Nations League B
11.	24 March 2021	Dr. Ir. Franklin Essed Stadion, Paramaribo, Suriname	Cayman Islands	3–0	3–0	2022 FIFA World Cup qualification
12.	16 July 2021	Exploria Stadium, Orlando, United States	Costa Rica	1–0	1–2	2021 CONCACAF Gold Cup
13.	20 July 2021	BBVA Compass Stadium, Houston, United States	Guadeloupe	1–0	2–1	2021 CONCACAF Gold Cup
14.	15 October 2023	Dr. Ir. Franklin Essed Stadion, Paramaribo, Suriname	Grenada	2–0	4–0	2023–24 CONCACAF Nations League A
15.	11 October 2024	Dr. Ir. Franklin Essed Stadion, Paramaribo, Suriname	Costa Rica	1–1	1–1	2024–25 CONCACAF Nations League A
Last updated 11 October 2024

== Honours ==
Individual

- Surinamese Footballer of the Year: 2019
- CONCACAF Nations League Top Scorer: 2019–20
