= Damian Rasak =

Polish footballer

Personal information
- Date of birth: 8 February 1996 (age 30)
- Place of birth: Toruń, Poland
- Height: 1.84 m (6 ft 0 in)
- Position: Midfielder

Team information
- Current team: GKS Katowice (on loan from Újpest)
- Number: 26

Youth career
- –2012: Elana Toruń
- 2013–2016: Chievo
- 2014–2015: → Bari (loan)

Senior career*
| Years | Team | Apps | (Gls) |
| 2012–2013 | Elana Toruń | 17 | (0) |
| 2013–2016 | Chievo | 0 | (0) |
| 2015–2016 | → Torres (loan) | 15 | (0) |
| 2016–2017 | Miedź Legnica | 41 | (5) |
| 2017–2023 | Wisła Płock | 153 | (6) |
| 2023–2025 | Górnik Zabrze | 62 | (8) |
| 2025– | Újpest | 34 | (1) |
| 2026– | → GKS Katowice (loan) | 14 | (0) |

International career
| 2013 | Poland U17 | 4 | (0) |
| 2013–2014 | Poland U18 | 5 | (0) |
| 2014 | Poland U19 | 1 | (0) |
| 2016–2017 | Poland U20 | 9 | (0) |
| 2017 | Poland U21 | 1 | (0) |
- * Club domestic league appearances and goals as of 10:28, 30 May 2026 (UTC)

Damian Rasak (born 8 February 1996) is a Polish professional footballer who plays as a midfielder for Ekstraklasa club GKS Katowice, on loan from Nemzeti Bajnokság I club Újpest.

== Career statistics ==
As of match played 23 May 2026

Appearances and goals by club, season and competition
| Club | Season | League | | | National cup (Note: Includes Polish Cup, Magyar Kupa) | | Other | | Total | |
| Club | Season | Division | Apps | Goals | Apps | Goals | Apps | Goals | Apps | Goals |
|---|---|---|---|---|---|---|---|---|---|---|
| Elana Toruń | 2012–13 | II liga | 17 | 0 | 1 | 0 | — | | 18 | 0 |
| Torres (loan) | 2015–16 | Serie D | 15 | 0 | — | | — | | 15 | 0 |
| Miedź Legnica | 2015–16 | I liga | 11 | 1 | — | | — | | 11 | 1 |
| Miedź Legnica | 2016–17 | I liga | 30 | 4 | 1 | 0 | — | | 31 | 4 |
| Miedź Legnica | Total | | 41 | 5 | 1 | 0 | — | | 42 | 5 |
| Wisła Płock | 2017–18 | Ekstraklasa | 24 | 0 | — | | — | | 24 | 0 |
| Wisła Płock | 2018–19 | Ekstraklasa | 31 | 0 | 3 | 0 | — | | 34 | 0 |
| Wisła Płock | 2019–20 | Ekstraklasa | 28 | 0 | 0 | 0 | — | | 28 | 0 |
| Wisła Płock | 2020–21 | Ekstraklasa | 26 | 3 | 2 | 0 | — | | 28 | 3 |
| Wisła Płock | 2021–22 | Ekstraklasa | 27 | 3 | 1 | 0 | — | | 28 | 3 |
| Wisła Płock | 2022–23 | Ekstraklasa | 17 | 0 | 1 | 0 | — | | 18 | 0 |
| Wisła Płock | Total | | 153 | 6 | 7 | 0 | — | | 160 | 6 |
| Górnik Zabrze | 2022–23 | Ekstraklasa | 12 | 2 | — | | — | | 12 | 2 |
| Górnik Zabrze | 2023–24 | Ekstraklasa | 33 | 2 | 3 | 0 | — | | 36 | 2 |
| Górnik Zabrze | 2024–25 | Ekstraklasa | 17 | 4 | 1 | 0 | — | | 18 | 4 |
| Górnik Zabrze | Total | | 62 | 8 | 4 | 0 | — | | 66 | 8 |
| Újpest | 2024–25 | Nemzeti Bajnokság I | 16 | 1 | 2 | 0 | — | | 18 | 1 |
| Újpest | 2025–26 | Nemzeti Bajnokság I | 18 | 0 | 0 | 0 | — | | 18 | 0 |
| Újpest | Total | | 34 | 1 | 2 | 0 | — | | 36 | 1 |
| GKS Katowice (loan) | 2025–26 | Ekstraklasa | 14 | 0 | 2 | 0 | — | | 16 | 0 |
| GKS Katowice (loan) | 2026–27 | Ekstraklasa | 0 | 0 | 0 | 0 | 0 | 0 | 0 | 0 |
| GKS Katowice (loan) | Total | | 14 | 0 | 2 | 0 | 0 | 0 | 16 | 0 |
| Career total | | | 336 | 20 | 17 | 0 | 0 | 0 | 353 | 20 |

== Honours ==
Chievo Primavera

- Campionato Nazionale Primavera: 2013–14
