= Matt Brandstein =

American writer (born 1972)

- Brandstein, as drawn by Ernie Colón
- Born: January 29, 1972 (age 54)
- Area: Writer
- Pseudonym: Moshe
- Notable works: Mendy and the Golem

Matt Brandstein (born January 29, 1972) is an American writer and occasional Bollywood film actor. He is most known for his writing of the popular Jewish children's comic book series Mendy and the Golem. Brandstein often employs the use of his Hebrew name Moshe in honor of his Jewish heritage.

== Biography ==
Born January 29, 1972, Brandstein grew up in downtown Chicago, where he attended the Latin School of Chicago for fourteen years. After moving to New York City, Brandstein enrolled in New York University, Tisch School of the Arts, where he received his Bachelor of Fine Arts degree in Film. Brandstein's writing career began in the music business. He collaborated with prominent directors including Brett Ratner, Diane Martel and Marcus Raboy in the conceptualization of music video treatments for top artists like Mariah Carey, Sting and D'Angelo.

In 2003, Brandstein took on the role of the writer of the second phase of the popular Jewish children's comic book Mendy and the Golem. Notable comic book artists Stan Goldberg, Barry Grossman, Ernie Colón and Joe Rubinstein have all participated in the creation of recent issues.

The comic book's characters' looks have recently been reinvented by reclusive European artist Kola Remaz. Remaz, letterer and Editor in Chief, Tani Pinson aka "Chief Golem" and writer Matt Brandstein make up the creative team responsible for a brand new Golem Factory series expected to launch in the fall of 2026.

As an actor, Brandstein made a brief cameo as a CIA operative in the 2006 Karan Johar Bollywood blockbuster Kabhi Alvida Naa Kehna. That same year, he appeared as a Hip Hop dance enthusiast in the Bollywood musical comedy Jaan-E-Mann.
