= Christian Mendy =

Senegalese footballer (born 1984)

Personal information
- Date of birth: 7 November 1984 (age 42)
- Place of birth: Boutoupa, Senegal
- Height: 1.82 m (6 ft 0 in)
- Position: Forward

Youth career
- 2000–2003: Laval

Senior career*
| Years | Team | Apps | (Gls) |
| 2003–2004 | Laval | 13 | (0) |
| 2004 | Alavés | 0 | (0) |
| 2004–2005 | SO Romorantin | 4 | (0) |
| 2005 | AC Crevalcore | 4 | (0) |
| 2006–2008 | RCF Paris | 51 | (0) |
| 2008–2009 | Martigues | 9 | (1) |
| 2009–2010 | Red Star | 19 | (0) |
| 2010–2012 | FC Versailles 78 | | |
- * Club domestic league appearances and goals

Christian Mendy (born 7 November 1984) is a French-Senegalese former professional footballer who played as a forward.

== Career ==
Mendy was born in Boutoupa, Senegal. After playing for Laval in Ligue 2, he joined Alavés on a five-year contract in October 2004. He went on to play for SO Romorantin, Italian side AC Crevalcore, RCF Paris, Martigues, Red Star, and FC Versailles 78.
