= Milan Tučić =

Slovenian footballer (born 1996)

Personal information
- Date of birth: 15 August 1996 (age 30)
- Place of birth: Ljubljana, Slovenia
- Height: 1.86 m (6 ft 1 in)
- Position: Striker

Team information
- Current team: Bravo
- Number: 33

Youth career
- –2015: Bravo

Senior career*
| Years | Team | Apps | (Gls) |
| 2015–2017 | Bravo | 48 | (47) |
| 2017–2019 | Rudar Velenje | 69 | (23) |
| 2019–2021 | OH Leuven | 4 | (0) |
| 2021 | → Bravo (loan) | 18 | (10) |
| 2021–2023 | Hokkaido Consadole Sapporo | 37 | (2) |
| 2024–2025 | Bravo | 27 | (7) |
| 2025–2026 | Újpest | 29 | (3) |
| 2026– | Bravo | 0 | (0) |

International career
| 2017–2018 | Slovenia U21 | 6 | (2) |
- * Club domestic league appearances and goals as of 4 September 2026

Milan Tučić (born 15 August 1996) is a Slovenian footballer who plays as a striker for Slovenian PrvaLiga club Bravo.

== Club career ==
Tučić played for the youth teams of Slovenian club Bravo. In the 2014–15 season, he made his debut appearance for Bravo's first team, which was playing in the Ljubljana Regional League (fourth division) at the time. In the 2016–17 season of the Slovenian Third League, he scored 32 goals in 23 appearances, which made him the top goalscorer of the Third League's Centre Division, as his club won the league title and was promoted to the Slovenian Second League at the end of the season. In July 2017, he joined Slovenian PrvaLiga side Rudar Velenje. In his two years with Rudar, he scored 23 goals in 69 league appearances, and also played in the 2018–19 UEFA Europa League qualifying rounds, where he scored twice against Tre Fiori.

On 2 September 2019, he signed with Belgian club OH Leuven. Tučić made only four league appearances for Leuven until January 2021, when he was loaned out to his former club Bravo, which had been promoted to the Slovenian PrvaLiga by then. In the second part of the 2020–21 PrvaLiga season, he scored 10 goals in 18 league appearances.

In August 2021, Tučić signed for J1 League club Hokkaido Consadole Sapporo.

== International career ==
From 2017 to 2018, Tučić made six appearances for the Slovenian under-21 team, and also scored two goals in the process.

== Career statistics ==
As of match played 28 October 2023

Appearances and goals by club, season and competition
| Club | Season | League | | | National cup | | League cup | | Continental | | Total | |
| Club | Season | Division | Apps | Goals | Apps | Goals | Apps | Goals | Apps | Goals | Apps | Goals |
|---|---|---|---|---|---|---|---|---|---|---|---|---|
| Bravo | 2014–15 | Ljubljana Regional League | 1 | 0 | — | | — | | — | | 1 | 0 |
| Bravo | 2015–16 | Slovenian Third League | 24 | 15 | — | | — | | — | | 24 | 15 |
| Bravo | 2016–17 | Slovenian Third League | 23 | 32 | — | | — | | — | | 23 | 32 |
| Bravo | Total | | 48 | 47 | 0 | 0 | 0 | 0 | 0 | 0 | 48 | 47 |
| Rudar Velenje | 2017–18 | Slovenian PrvaLiga | 28 | 7 | 0 | 0 | — | | — | | 28 | 7 |
| Rudar Velenje | 2018–19 | Slovenian PrvaLiga | 35 | 15 | 0 | 0 | — | | 3 (Note: Appearance(s) in UEFA Europa League) | 2 | 38 | 17 |
| Rudar Velenje | 2019–20 | Slovenian PrvaLiga | 6 | 1 | 0 | 0 | — | | — | | 6 | 1 |
| Rudar Velenje | Total | | 69 | 23 | 0 | 0 | 0 | 0 | 3 | 2 | 72 | 25 |
| OH Leuven | 2019–20 | Challenger Pro League | 3 | 0 | 1 | 0 | — | | — | | 4 | 0 |
| OH Leuven | 2020–21 | Challenger Pro League | 1 | 0 | 0 | 0 | — | | — | | 1 | 0 |
| OH Leuven | Total | | 4 | 0 | 1 | 0 | 0 | 0 | 0 | 0 | 5 | 0 |
| Bravo (loan) | 2020–21 | Slovenian PrvaLiga | 18 | 10 | 0 | 0 | — | | — | | 18 | 10 |
| Hokkaido Consadole Sapporo | 2021 | J1 League | 11 | 2 | 0 | 0 | 1 | 0 | — | | 12 | 2 |
| Hokkaido Consadole Sapporo | 2022 | J1 League | 14 | 0 | 0 | 0 | 5 | 1 | — | | 19 | 1 |
| Hokkaido Consadole Sapporo | 2023 | J1 League | 12 | 0 | 2 | 0 | 6 | 3 | — | | 20 | 3 |
| Hokkaido Consadole Sapporo | Total | | 37 | 2 | 2 | 0 | 12 | 4 | 0 | 0 | 51 | 6 |
| Career total | | | 176 | 82 | 3 | 0 | 12 | 4 | 3 | 2 | 194 | 88 |
