= Tiago Gonçalves (footballer, born 2000) =

Portuguese footballer (born 2000)

Personal information
- Full name: Tiago Lisboa Silva Gonçalves
- Date of birth: 18 August 2000 (age 26)
- Place of birth: Cascais, Portugal
- Height: 1.83 m (6 ft 0 in)
- Positions: Left-back; left winger

Team information
- Current team: Argeș Pitești
- Number: 25

Youth career
- 2009–2013: Tires
- 2013–2019: Belenenses
- 2019–2021: Genoa

Senior career*
Years	Team	Apps	(Gls)
2021	Genoa	0	(0)
2021	→ Valladolid B (loan)	0	(0)
2021–2022	Messina	21	(3)
2022–2023	Novara	15	(0)
2023	→ Pontedera (loan)	6	(0)
2023–2024	Belenenses	14	(0)
2024–2025	Hermannstadt	36	(3)
2025–2026	Újpest	12	(0)
2026	→ Mantova (loan)	9	(0)
2026–	Argeș Pitești	6	(0)
- * Club domestic league appearances and goals as of 6 November 2026

Tiago Lisboa Silva Gonçalves (born 18 August 2000) is a Portuguese professional footballer who plays as a left-back or a left winger for Liga I club Argeș Pitești.

== Club career ==
On 20 January 2026, Gonçalves was loaned to Italian club Mantova of Serie B.

== Career statistics ==
As of match played 6 November 2026

Club	Season	League			National cup (Note: Includes Coppa Italia Serie C, Cupa României, Magyar Kupa)		Europe		Other		Total	
Club	Season	Division	Apps	Goals	Apps	Goals	Apps	Goals	Apps	Goals	Apps	Goals
Valladolid B (loan)	2020–21	Segunda División B	0	0	–		–		0	0	0	0
Messina	2021–22	Serie C	21	3	2	0	–		–		23	3
Novara	2022–23	Serie C	15	0	1	0	–		–		16	0
Pontedera (loan)	2022–23	Serie C	6	0	–		–		0	0	6	0
Belenenses	2023–24	Liga Portugal 2	14	0	–		–		–		14	0
Hermannstadt	2024–25	Liga I	36	3	6	1	–		–		42	4
Újpest	2025–26	Nemzeti Bajnokság I	12	0	1	0	–		–		13	0
Mantova (loan)	2025–26	Serie B	9	0	–		–		–		9	0
Argeș Pitești	2026–27	Liga I	6	0	0	0	–		–		6	0
Career total			119	6	10	1	–		0	0	129	7

== Honours ==
Hermannstadt

- Cupa României runner-up: 2024–25
