= Ambrose Mendy =

British boxing promoter

Ambrose Mendy (born August 1954) is a British boxing manager, advisor and sports agent. He has managed and/or advised Nigel Benn; James DeGale; Chris Eubank Junior; Lloyd Honeyghan & Errol Christie among others during a career in boxing that started in the late 1970s.

As of 2007, he was acting as a consultant to promoter Dennis Hobson.
