= Vincent Mendy =

French footballer (born 1988)

Personal information
- Date of birth: 22 January 1988 (age 38)
- Place of birth: Paris, France
- Height: 1.80 m (5 ft 11 in)
- Position: Defensive midfielder

Youth career
- 1999–2005: FC Versailles 78

Senior career*
Years	Team	Apps	(Gls)
2005–2006	Sparta Prague B	16	(6)
2006–2010	Banik Most	65	(10)
2006–2008	FK SIAD Most	12	(0)
2010	→ SK Hlavice (loan)	5	(1)
2011	Ethnikos Piraeus	2	(0)
- * Club domestic league appearances and goals

Vincent Mendy (born 22 January 1988) is a French football defensive midfielder.

== Career ==
=== FK SIAD Most ===
Mendy made his professional league debut at the age of 19, on 1 April 2007, starting for FK SIAD Most in a 0-0 draw with FK Teplice during the 2006-07 season of the Czech First League, the top league in the Czech Republic.

Mendy made 12 career Czech First League appearances between 2006 and 2008.

=== SK Hlavice ===
On 18 February 2010, he left FK SIAD Most and joined for a six-month loan deal to SK Hlavice.

== Personal life ==
Vincent is the younger brother of Alexandre Mendy, a midfielder for 1.FC Saarbrücken in Germany. Mendy is of Senegalese descent.
