= Mendy and the Golem =

- Mendy and the Golem #1 (Jan. 2003). Cover art by Stan Goldberg & Joe Rubinstein

Publication information
- Publisher: Mendy Enterprises; The Golem Factory
- Format: Ongoing series

Creative team
- Written by: Leibel Estrin; Matt Brandstein
- Artist(s): Dovid Sears; Stan Goldberg; Ernie Colón; Joe Rubinstein

Mendy and the Golem, originally written by Leibel Estrin and later by Matt Brandstein, is the name of two American comic book series featuring Jewish characters.

The original was a slapstick comedy aimed primarily at children. The second series straddles a variety of genres, including swashbuckling adventures with elements of fantasy, mystery, and science fiction, while retaining slapstick humor offset by dashes of satire and political and cultural commentary. The second more modern version had artwork in the style of Archie Comics by former Archie artist Stan Goldberg.

== Publication history ==
The first Mendy and the Golem series followed the exploits of Mendy Klein, who found a Golem in their father's synagogue. The Klein siblings and their Golem (named Sholem) get into all sorts of scrapes, and walk out of them with a moral based on Jewish texts.

In the second series, the Kleins have created a modern-day Golem with the assistance of the venerable Reb Zushe, an aging Rabbinical scholar. This version of the characters originated as a series of comic strips, Mendy's Fun Page that ran weekly in Jewish newspapers in North America and Australia, beginning in 1997.

Mendy and the Golem Vol. 2, #3 (#9) (March 1983). Cover art by Dovid Sears.

=== 1981 series ===
Billed as "The World's Only Kosher Comic Book", Mendy Enterprises' Mendy and the Golem first appeared in 1981 available for $1.00. Written by Leibel Estrin and drawn by Dovid Sears, the comic book featured the offbeat misadventures of Mendy, an Orthodox Jewish boy, and his pet Golem. Other characters include Mendy's parents, Rabbi Yaakov and Sara Klein; Mendy's sister, Rivky; and a host of colorful supporting characters such as Moshe the Mayven; the Lone Stranger and his faithful friend Toronto; Captain Video; Dr. Hardheart and his evil robot Oy Vayder; and Professor Nemo.

The artists and creators also frequently break the fourth wall and make various appearance's, sometimes to explain Hebrew words, explain/add to the joke, or react to something that was said, most notably in Vol 16 War and Peace which starts off with 6 pages of the editors, publishers, and artists talking about creating that very issue.

Twenty issues were made, but only nineteen issues were produced and printed.

Vol 1 Mendy And The Golem

Vol 2 Sholom's Wheel Of Fortune

Vol 3 Whos New At The Zoo

Vol 4 School Daze

Vol 5 Write Makes Might

Vol 6 As Time Goes Bye

Vol 7 Sholom Doesn't Have A Prayer

Vol 8 Wrong Route To Your Roots

Vol 9 Home On The Ssstrange

Vol 10 Double-Trouble

Vol 11 2002 A Spaced-Out Odyssey

Vol 12 I Spy A Crooked Guy

Vol 13 Sholom's Secret Mission

Vol 14 The Most Dangerous Game Of All

Vol 15 Don't Shoot The Basketball Player

Vol 16 War And Peace

Vol 17 A friend In Need Is A Friend Indeed

Vol 18 Return Of The Bad Guy

Vol 19 The Last Laughs On You

Vol 20 'Wherever I go, Ego" [volume 19 had a teaser on the back for the next volume, as they all did, however it was never printed]

=== 2003 series ===
A new Mendy and the Golem series appeared in 2003, published by The Golem Factory. Under editor-in-chief Tani Pinson, it was written by Matt Brandstein and featured art by Stan Goldberg, Ernie Colón and Joe Rubinstein.
