= Alexandre Mendy (footballer, born 1983) =

French footballer

Personal information
- Full name: Noël Alexandre Mendy
- Date of birth: 14 December 1983 (age 42)
- Place of birth: Paris, France
- Height: 1.87 m (6 ft 2 in)
- Positions: Right back; winger

Youth career
- 1994–1999: OSC Elancourt
- 1999–2001: FC Versailles 78

Senior career*
Years	Team	Apps	(Gls)
2001–2003	FC Versailles 78	34	(1)
2003–2005	FK Marila Příbram	57	(6)
2006–2007	FK SIAD Most	40	(8)
2007–2011	FK Mladá Boleslav	110	(10)
2011–2012	Chesterfield	34	(2)
2012–2014	Hansa Rostock	71	(2)
2014–2019	1. FC Saarbrücken	114	(5)
Medal record
FK Mladá Boleslav
Winner	Czech Cup	2011
- * Club domestic league appearances and goals

Noël Alexandre "Alex" Mendy (born 14 December 1983 in Paris) is a French footballer who plays as a right back.

He played formerly for FK Mladá Boleslav and helped them win the Czech Cup in 2011. He is known for his skill and pace.

== Early career ==
Born in Paris, Mendy started his career at French club FC Versailles 78. Before trying his career in the Czech 1st Division in 2003 when he moved to FK Marila Příbram. The first club he played for in the Czech First League was FK Marila Příbram where he scored 6 league goals in 57 appearances before moving to FK SIAD Most.

=== Mladá Boleslav ===
In 2007, he joined FK Mladá Boleslav on loan. Mendy made his European debut for Mladá Boleslav against Palermo. In 2007, Mendy scored for Mladá Boleslav in the group stages of the UEFA Cup against Villarreal CF and IF Elfsborg, However they failed to qualify past the group stage after losing to AEK Athens and Fiorentina. Despite only scoring one goal in 24 league appearances, his move to FK Mladá Boleslav was made permanent in 2008.

During the 2010–11 season, Mendy played all 30 league games for FK Mladá Boleslav scoring six goals as he helped them finish in fifth place in the Czech First League and also win the Czech Cup for the first time in Mladá Boleslav's history after beating SK Sigma Olomouc on penalties, Mendy scored one of the penalties for Mladá Boleslav in the final. The Cup win also saw Mladá Boleslav qualify for the UEFA Europa League for the following season. After his contract with FK Mladá Boleslav expired in June 2011, Mendy sought pastures new and became a free agent. He scored 24 goals in 207 appearances in the Czech First League, which is one of the highest number of matches among expatriate players in this league and the most among French players.

==== Leeds United trial ====
On 19 July 2011, he played as an unnamed trialist on the right wing for Leeds United during a friendly match against Rochdale along with fellow trialists Jlloyd Samuel and Isiah Osbourne. He played for Leeds in the friendly against Sheffield Wednesday where he was officially confirmed as the unnamed trialist by his real name. With Mendy impressing in his first two pre season games with Leeds his trial was extended even further for the match against Norwegian club Sandefjord Fotball. With Mendy again impressing, starting his third pre-season match in a row for Leeds.

Mendy again played for Leeds in their 3–2 win against Newcastle United at Elland Road, coming on as a second-half substitute where he impressed on the right wing. After the match manager Simon Grayson said he would make a decision whether to sign Mendy and fellow trialist Boldi Bodor in the next two days after saying he felt both trialists had done ok in their spells. On 4 August 2011, Grayson confirmed on Yorkshire Radio the club were looking into signing Mendy permanently, however the deal was taking time as there were complications. Grayson confirmed that he was looking to sign the player and send him out on loan to help him learn the English game.

With Leeds entering contract talks with Mendy, the move was called off on 11 August, after Leeds decided that they had to prioritise the transfer budget to sign players in other positions.

=== Chesterfield ===
On 17 August 2011, Mendy signed for Chesterfield on a 1-year deal until 30 June 2012.

Mendy scored his first goal for Chesterfield in the League Two 3–0 victory over Bournemouth on 10 September 2011. Mendy was part of the side that won the Football League Trophy in March 2012 at Wembley Stadium, it was his cross that set up the first goal for Chesterfield. He was released by the club at the end of the 2011–12 season.

=== Hansa Rostock ===
Mendy signed a two-year contract with German Club Hansa Rostock on 10 June 2012.

=== 1.FC Saarbrücken ===
In 2014, he signed a contract with 1.FC Saarbrücken till 2016. He played with shirtnumber 4.

== Personal life ==
Alexandre is the older brother of Vincent Mendy who plays as a defensive midfielder.

== Honours ==
FK Mladá Boleslav

- Czech Cup: 2011

Chesterfield

- Football League Trophy: 2011–12
