= Zoltán Szélesi =

Hungarian footballer and coach

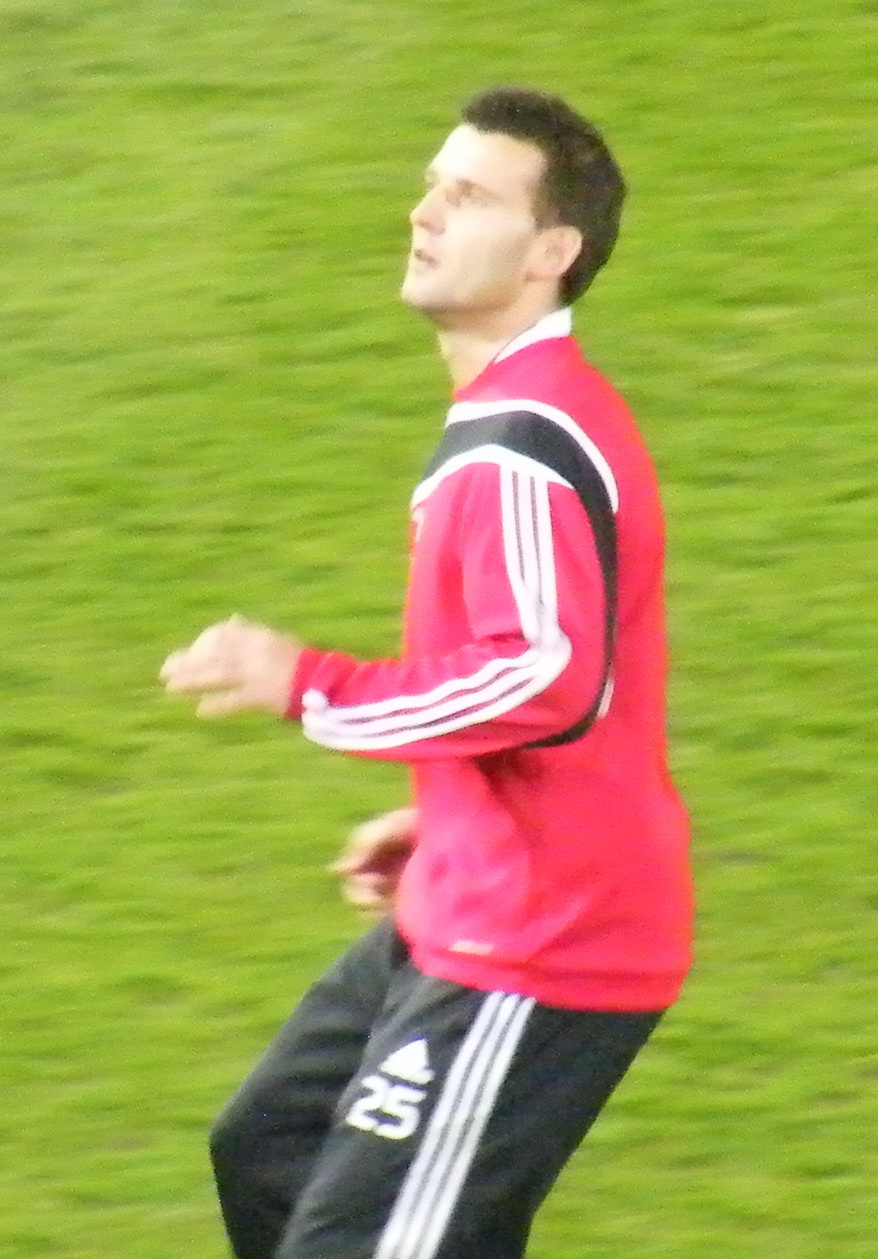
- Szélesi in 2010

Personal information
- Date of birth: 22 November 1981 (age 44)
- Place of birth: Budapest, Hungary
- Height: 1.84 m (6 ft 0 in)
- Position: Defender

Youth career
- 1994–1998: Újpest

Senior career*
Years	Team	Apps	(Gls)
1998–2004	Újpest	118	(2)
2004–2007	Energie Cottbus	65	(3)
2007–2009	Strasbourg	40	(0)
2009–2010	Debrecen	17	(0)
2010–2011	Olympiacos Volos	29	(0)
2011–2012	NEC Nijmegen	16	(0)
2012–2014	Újpest	26	(0)
2014–2015	Puskás	34	(0)
Total		345	(5)

International career
1998–1999	Hungary U17	13	(0)
1999–2000	Hungary U18	4	(0)
1999–2000	Hungary U21	2	(0)
2004–2015	Hungary	28	(0)

Managerial career
- 2015–2017: Hungary U17
- 2019–2020: Puskás Akadémia U17
- 2020–2024: Hungary U17
- 2024–2025: Hungary U21
- 2025–: Újpest
- * Club domestic league appearances and goals

Zoltán Szélesi (Hungarian pronunciation: [ˈzoltaːn ˈseːlɛʃi]) (born 22 November 1981) is a Hungarian former professional footballer who played as a defender. He is the head coach of the Nemzeti Bajnokság I club Újpest FC.

== PLaying career ==
After being released by French club RC Strasbourg Szélesi signed for Hungarian champions Debreceni VSC in August 2009.

== Managerial career ==
On 30 December 2025, he was appointed as the manager of Nemzeti Bajnokság I club Újpest. On 24 January 2026, he debuted with a 1–1 draw against Nyíregyháza Spartacus FC at the Városi Stadion in the 2025–26 Nemzeti Bajnokság I.

== Career statistics ==
=== Club ===
Appearances and goals by club, season and competition
Club	Season	League			National cup		League cup		Europe		Total	
Club	Season	Division	Apps	Goals	Apps	Goals	Apps	Goals	Apps	Goals	Apps	Goals
Újpest	1998–99	Nemzeti Bajnokság I	3	0	0	0	0	0	0	0	3	0
Újpest	1999–00	Nemzeti Bajnokság I	12	0	1	0	0	0	0	0	13	0
Újpest	2000–01	Nemzeti Bajnokság I	20	0	0	0	0	0	0	0	20	0
Újpest	2001–02	Nemzeti Bajnokság I	27	0	0	0	0	0	0	0	27	0
Újpest	2002–03	Nemzeti Bajnokság I	28	1	1	0	0	0	3	0	32	1
Újpest	2003–04	Nemzeti Bajnokság I	28	1	1	0	0	0	0	0	29	1
Újpest	Total		118	2	3	0	0	0	3	0	124	2
Energie Cottbus	2004–05	2. Bundesliga	27	3	2	0	0	0	0	0	29	3
Energie Cottbus	2005–06	2. Bundesliga	15	0	2	0	0	0	0	0	17	0
Energie Cottbus	2006–07	Bundesliga	22	0	1	0	0	0	0	0	23	0
Energie Cottbus	2007–08	Bundesliga	1	0	1	0	0	0	0	0	2	0
Energie Cottbus	Total		65	3	6	0	0	0	0	0	71	3
Strasbourg	2007–08	Ligue 1	22	0	0	0	0	0	0	0	22	0
Strasbourg	2008–09	Ligue 2	18	0	0	0	0	0	0	0	18	0
Strasbourg	Total		40	0	0	0	0	0	0	0	40	0
Debrecen	2009–10	Nemzeti Bajnokság I	17	0	5	0	2	0	4	0	28	0
Olympiacos Volos	2010–11	Super League Greece	29	0	5	0	0	0	0	0	34	0
Olympiacos Volos	2011–12	Super League Greece	0	0	0	0	0	0	4	1	4	1
Olympiacos Volos	Total		29	0	5	0	0	0	4	1	38	1
Nijmegen	2011–12	Eredivisie	16	0	1	0	0	0	0	0	17	0
Újpest	2012–13	Nemzeti Bajnokság I	26	0	1	0	0	0	0	0	27	0
Újpest	2013–14	Nemzeti Bajnokság I	0	0	1	0	0	0	0	0	1	0
Újpest	Total		26	0	2	0	0	0	0	0	28	0
Puskás	2013–14	Nemzeti Bajnokság I	6	0	0	0	0	0	0	0	6	0
Puskás	2014–15	Nemzeti Bajnokság I	28	0	0	0	3	0	0	0	31	0
Puskás	Total		34	0	0	0	3	0	0	0	37	0
Career total			345	5	22	0	5	0	11	1	383	6

=== International ===
Appearances and goals by national team and year
National team	Season	Apps	Goals
Hungary	2004	3	0
Hungary	2007	8	0
Hungary	2008	8	0
Hungary	2009	4	0
Hungary	2010	4	0
Hungary	2015	1	0
Total		28	0

== Honours ==
Debrecen

- Nemzeti Bajnokság I: 2009–10
- Magyar Kupa: 2009–10
- Ligakupa: 2009–10

Újpest

- Magyar Kupa: 2001–02
- Szuperkupa: 2002
