= Damir Krznar =

Croatian football player and manager (born 1972)

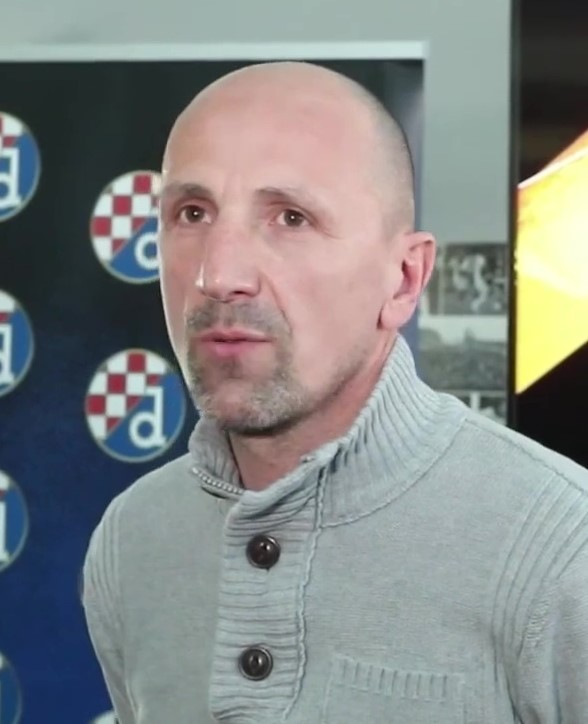
- Krznar in 2021

Personal information
- Date of birth: 10 July 1972 (age 54)
- Place of birth: Zabok, SR Croatia, Yugoslavia
- Height: 1.77 m (5 ft 10 in)
- Position: Left midfielder

Team information
- Current team: Gorica (manager)

Senior career*
Years	Team	Apps	(Gls)
1992–1995	Varteks	83	(4)
1995–2004	Dinamo Zagreb	122	(7)
2004–2010	Inter Zaprešić	134	(1)
Total		339	(12)

International career
1998	Croatia	1	(0)

Managerial career
- 2010–2011: Inter Zaprešić (assistant)
- 2011–2016: Dinamo Zagreb (assistant)
- 2013: Dinamo Zagreb (interim)
- 2016–2017: Al Nassr (assistant)
- 2017–2019: Al Ain (assistant)
- 2019: Al Hilal (assistant)
- 2020–2021: Dinamo Zagreb (assistant)
- 2021: Dinamo Zagreb
- 2022: Dinamo Zagreb II
- 2022–2023: Maribor
- 2023–2024: Celje
- 2025: Újpest
- 2026–: Gorica
- * Club domestic league appearances and goals

Damir Krznar (born 10 July 1972) is a Croatian professional football manager and former player who currentcly coaching Croatian club Gorica.

== Playing career ==
=== Club ===
Krznar spent his career playing for Varteks, Dinamo Zagreb and Inter Zaprešić.

=== International ===
He made his international debut coming in as a second half substitute for Robert Jarni against Poland on 22 April 1998, which was his only appearance for the Croatia national team.

== Managerial career ==
=== Career as assistant ===
In the period between 2010 and 2021, Krznar worked as an assistant coach to Ilija Lončarević at Inter Zaprešić, to Krunoslav Jurčić, Ante Čačić, Branko Ivanković and Zoran Mamić at Dinamo Zagreb, and to Mamić at Al Nassr, Al Ain and Al Hilal.

He served as Dinamo interim manager on two occasions; from August to September 2013, and from July to September 2015.

=== Dinamo Zagreb ===
After Zoran Mamić was sentenced to five years in prison on 15 March 2021, he resigned on the same day and was succeeded by Krznar, who made his debut as Dinamo head coach on 18 March in a 3–0 victory over Tottenham Hotspur at Stadion Maksimir, thus qualifying for the quarter-finals of the 2020–21 UEFA Europa League for the first time in the history of the club. Furthermore, Krznar became the first ever manager to eliminate Spurs head coach José Mourinho from the Europa League (the Portuguese took part in the competition two more times before–in 2002–03 coaching Porto, and in 2016–17 coaching Manchester United–winning both editions). However, Dinamo went on to lose their quarter-final fixture against Villarreal 3–1 on aggregate.

On 9 May 2021, Dinamo secured its 22nd Croatian First League title with a 5–1 victory over Rijeka, and the 32nd national league title in total. Ten days later, Dinamo also won the Croatian Cup title, with a victory against Istra 1961 by a scoreline of 6–3.

Krznar left Dinamo on 1 December 2021 after being eliminated by Rijeka in the quarter-finals of the Croatian Cup. However, the next month, he took over the reserve team of Dinamo, playing in the Croatian Second League, where he stayed until the team was dissolved following the 2021–22 season.

=== Maribor ===
On 16 August 2022, Krznar took charge of the reigning Slovenian PrvaLiga champions Maribor, signing a two-year contract. At the time of his arrival, Maribor was sitting in last place in the league with only three points out of five games. He led the club to third place in the league and also reached the cup final, earning a contract extension until 2026. However, after a poor start to the 2023–24 season, Krznar terminated his contract by mutual consent and left the club on 2 October 2023. In total, he led Maribor in 55 matches and achieved 28 wins, 13 draws and 14 defeats.

=== Celje ===
On 11 October 2023, Krznar was appointed manager of another Slovenian PrvaLiga side, Celje, after Albert Riera left the club to manage Girondins de Bordeaux. With Celje, he won the 2023–24 Slovenian PrvaLiga title, but left the club on 28 July 2024 along with his staff after his contract was terminated by mutual consent when Riera became available again following Bordeaux's financial collapse.

=== Újpest ===
On 5 May 2025, he was appointed as the manager of Nemzeti Bajnokság I club Újpest. He replaced Swedish manager Bartosz Grzelak.

== Managerial statistics ==
As of 28 July 2024

Managerial record by team and tenure
Club	From	To	Record				
Club	From	To	P	W	D	L	Win %
Dinamo Zagreb (interim)	22 August 2013	2 September 2013	3	3	0	0	100.00
Dinamo Zagreb	15 March 2021	1 December 2021	48	29	11	8	60.42
Dinamo Zagreb II	7 January 2022	16 August 2022	15	7	2	6	46.67
Maribor	16 August 2022	2 October 2023	55	28	13	14	50.91
Celje	11 October 2023	28 July 2024	31	20	7	4	64.52
Total			152	87	33	32	57.24

== Honours ==
=== Player ===
Dinamo Zagreb

- Croatian First League: 1995–96, 1996–97, 1997–98, 1998–99, 1999–00, 2002–03
- Croatian Cup: 1995–96, 1996–97, 1997–98, 2000–01, 2001–02, 2003–04
- Croatian Super Cup: 2002, 2003

=== Manager ===
Dinamo Zagreb

- Croatian First League: 2020–21
- Croatian Cup: 2020–21

Celje

- Slovenian First League: 2023–24
